= 2013–14 Segunda Liga =

24th season of second-tier football league in Portugal

Segunda Liga
- Season: 2013–14
- Champions: Moreirense
- Promoted: Moreirense; Penafiel
- Relegated: none
- Matches: 459
- Goals: 1,055 (2.3 per match)
- Top goalscorer: Pires (22 goals)
- Best goalkeeper: Quim
- Biggest home win: Moreirense 7–0 Chaves
- Biggest away win: Trofense 1–7 Moreirense
- Highest scoring: Trofense 1–7 Moreirense
- Highest attendance: 4,131; Penafiel 1–2 Chaves (27 April 2014)
- Total attendance: 344,786
- Average attendance: 8,209

The 2013–14 Segunda Liga, also known as the Liga Revolução by Cabovisão for sponsorship reasons, was the 24th season of the second-tier of football in Portugal. A total of 22 teams played in the league in this season.

Moreirense and Penafiel were promoted to the 2014–15 Primeira Liga, while Aves played (and lost for 2–0 on aggregate) a play-off with Paços de Ferreira (classified in the 15th position in the 2013–14 Primeira Liga) for a place in the 2014–15 Primeira Liga. Atlético stayed in the 2014–15 Segunda Liga after being invited by the Portuguese League for Professional Football (LPFP) as the 2014–15 Primeira Liga competition was expanded to 18 teams, because Boavista was reintegrated, along with the expansion of the 2014–15 Segunda Liga competition to 24 teams and also to the impossibility of a 4th place club from the 2013–14 Campeonato Nacional de Seniores to be promoted.

== Events ==
Despite finishing in 18th place in the 2012–13 season, Naval were relegated to the Portuguese Second Division, due to financial problems.

Naval's relegation allowed Sporting da Covilhã to be invited back to the Segunda Liga.

== Teams ==
Location of teams in Liga de Honra 2013–14
Location of teams in Liga de Honra 2013–14
Location of teams in Liga de Honra 2013–14

=== Stadia and locations ===
Club	City	Stadium	Capacity	2012–13 finish
Académico de Viseu	Viseu	Estádio do Fontelo	12,000	3rd (Segunda Divisão)
Atlético	Lisbon	Estádio da Tapadinha	15,000	17th
Beira-Mar	Aveiro	Estádio Municipal de Aveiro	30,127	16th (Primeira Liga)
Benfica B	Lisbon	Caixa Futebol Campus	3,000	7th
Braga B	Braga	Estádio 1º de Maio	30,000	15th
Desportivo de Chaves	Chaves	Estádio Municipal de Chaves	12,000	1st (Segunda Divisão)
Desportivo das Aves	Vila das Aves	Estádio do CD das Aves	10,250	5th
Farense	Faro	Estádio de São Luís	15,000	2nd (Segunda Divisão)
Feirense	Santa Maria da Feira	Estádio Marcolino de Castro	4,667	13th
Leixões	Matosinhos	Estádio do Mar	16,035	3rd
Marítimo B	Funchal	Campo da Imaculada Conceição	3,000	16th
Moreirense	Moreira de Cónegos	Parque de Jogos Comendador Joaquim de Almeida Freitas	6,100	15th (Primeira Liga)
União Oliveirense	Oliveira de Azeméis	Estádio Carlos Osório	9,100	8th
Penafiel	Penafiel	Estádio Municipal 25 de Abril	7,000	9th
Portimonense	Portimão	Estádio Municipal de Portimão	9,544	6th
Porto B	Porto	Estádio Municipal Jorge Sampaio	8,500	14th
Santa Clara	Ponta Delgada	Estádio de São Miguel	13,277	11th
Sporting B	Lisbon	Estádio José Alvalade	52,076	4th
Sporting da Covilhã	Covilhã	Complexo Desportivo da Covilhã	3,000	20th
Tondela	Tondela	Estádio João Cardoso	2,600	10th
Trofense	Trofa	Estádio do Clube Desportivo Trofense	3,164	19th
União da Madeira	Funchal	Estádio da Madeira	3,000	12th

=== Personnel and kits ===
Note: Flags indicate national team as has been defined under FIFA eligibility rules. Players and Managers may hold more than one non-FIFA nationality.

Team	Head coach	Captain	Kit manufacturer	Shirt sponsor
Académico de Viseu	(Portugal) Filipe Moreira	(Brazil) Cláudio	Lacatoni	Palácio do Gelo
Atlético CP	(Spain) Gorka Etxeberria	(Portugal) Hugo Carreira	Tepa	
Beira-Mar	(Portugal) Jorge Neves	(Portugal) Jaime	Joma	32Group
Benfica B	(Portugal) Hélder Cristóvão	(Portugal) Rúben Pinto	adidas	meo (H) / Moche (A)
Braga B	(Portugal) José Alberto Costa	(Portugal) Gonçalo Silva	Macron	Banco BIC
Chaves	(Portugal) João Eusébio	(Portugal) João Fernandes	Lacatoni	CaboVisão
Desportivo das Aves	(Portugal) Fernando Valente	(Portugal) Leandro	Lacatoni	
Farense	(Portugal) Jorge Paixão	(Portugal) Hugo Luz	Joma	
Feirense	(Portugal) Pedro Miguel	(Portugal) Cris	adidas	CaboVisão
Leixões	(Portugal) Pedro Correia	(Portugal) Nuno Silva	SportZone	
Marítimo B	(Portugal) Ivo Vieira	(Portugal) Ricardo Alves	Lacatoni	Banif
Moreirense	(Portugal) Vítor Oliveira	(Brazil) Anilton Júnior	CDT	
Oliveirense	(Portugal) Henrique Nunes	(Guinea-Bissau) Banjai	Macron	
Penafiel	(Portugal) Miguel Leal	(Portugal) Ferreira	Desportreino	IPOL / PenafielVerde / Restradas
Portimonense	(Angola) Lázaro Oliveira	(Portugal) Ricardo Pessoa	Macron	Visit Portimão
Porto B	(Portugal) Luís Castro	(Portugal) Zé António	Nike	meo (H) / Moche (A) / PT (Alt.)
Santa Clara	(Portugal) Carlos Condeço	(Canada) Pedro Pacheco	Lacatoni	
Sporting B	(Portugal) Abel Ferreira	(Portugal) Kikas	Puma	meo (H) / Moche (A)
Sporting da Covilhã	(Portugal) Francisco Chaló	(Portugal) Edgar	Desportreino	CaboVisão / Natura IMB Hotels
Tondela	(Portugal) Vítor Paneira	(Brazil) Carlos André	Macron	Gialmar Produtos Alimentares S.A. / Sr. Bacalhau
Trofense	(Portugal) Luís Diogo	(Portugal) Tiago	Lacatoni	
União da Madeira	(Portugal) José Barros	(Argentina) Fernando Ávalos	Macron	Turismo da Madeira

=== Managerial changes ===
Team	Outgoing manager	Manner of departure	Date of vacancy	Position in table	Incoming manager	Date of appointment
Santa Clara	(Portugal) Luís Miguel	Sacked	11 May 2013	Pre-season	(Portugal) Carlos Condeço	24 May 2013
Chaves	(Portugal) João Pinto	Resigned	14 May 2013	Pre-season	(Portugal) João Eusébio	6 June 2013
Porto B	(Portugal) Rui Gomes	Sacked	18 May 2013	Pre-season	(Portugal) Luís Castro	6 June 2013
Feirense	(Portugal) Quim Machado	Contract expired	18 May 2013	Pre-season	(Portugal) Pedro Miguel	19 June 2013
Desportivo das Aves	(Portugal) Professor Neca	Contract expired	18 May 2013	Pre-season	(Portugal) Fernando Valente	28 June 2013
Moreirense	(Portugal) Augusto Inácio	Contract expired	19 May 2013	Pre-season	(Portugal) Vítor Oliveira	20 May 2013
Beira-Mar	(Portugal) Costinha	Mutual Agreement	22 May 2013	Pre-season	(Portugal) Jorge Neves	3 July 2013
Oliveirense	(Portugal) João de Deus	Resigned	28 May 2013	Pre-season	(Portugal) Henrique Nunes	24 July 2013
Braga B	(Portugal) Toni	Mutual Agreement	28 May 2013	Pre-season	(Portugal) José Alberto Costa	15 June 2013
Benfica B	(Portugal) Luís Norton de Matos	Mutual Agreement	30 May 2013	Pre-season	(Portugal) Hélder	31 May 2013
Trofense	(Portugal) Micael Sequeira	Mutual Agreement	4 June 2013	Pre-season	(Portugal) Luís Diogo	7 June 2013
Sporting CP B	(Portugal) José Dominguez	Mutual Agreement	5 June 2013	Pre-season	(Portugal) Abel	1 July 2013
Atlético CP	(Portugal) Toni Pereira	Resigned	13 June 2013	Pre-season	(Portugal) Bruno Baltazar	8 July 2013
União da Madeira	(Serbia) Predrag Jokanović	Mutual Agreement	15 June 2013	Pre-season	(Portugal) José Barros	22 June 2013
Atlético CP	(Portugal) Bruno Baltazar	Resigned	6 August 2013	Pre-season	(Spain) Gorka Etxeberria	6 August 2013
Farense	(Portugal) Mauro de Brito	Mutual agreement	9 September 2013	22nd	(Portugal) Jorge Paixão	13 September 2013
Trofense	(Portugal) Luís Diogo	Sacked	3 October 2013	22nd	(Portugal) Porfírio Amorim	8 October 2013
Chaves	(Portugal) João Eusébio	Resigned	15 October 2013	13th	(Portugal) Quim Machado	16 October 2013
Tondela	(Portugal) Vítor Paneira	Sacked	8 November 2013	7th	(Portugal) Álvaro Magalhães	11 November 2013
Atlético CP	(Spain) Gorka Etxeberria	Resigned	10 November 2013	19th	(Portugal) Professor Neca	28 November 2013
Santa Clara	(Portugal) Carlos Condeço	Resigned	10 November 2013	18th	(Portugal) Horácio Gonçalves	19 November 2013
Oliveirense	(Portugal) Henrique Nunes	Sacked	2 December 2013	20th	(Portugal) Artur Marques	4 December 2013
Académico de Viseu	(Portugal) Filipe Moreira	Resigned	30 December 2013	20th	(Portugal) Ricardo Chéu	2 January 2014
Beira-Mar	(Portugal) Jorge Neves	Demoted to Assistant Manager	30 January 2014	15th	(Italy) Daniele Fortunato	30 January 2014
União da Madeira	(Portugal) José Barros	Resigned	30 January 2014	13th	(Portugal) Rui Mâncio	31 January 2014
Atlético CP	(Portugal) Professor Neca	Sacked	17 February 2014	22nd	(Portugal) Jorge Simão	17 February 2014
Braga B	(Portugal) José Alberto Costa	Mutual Agreement	24 February 2014	17th	(Portugal) Bruno Pereira	25 February 2014
Farense	(Portugal) Jorge Paixão	Signed by Braga	25 February 2014	11th	(Portugal) Antero Afonso	25 February 2014
Leixões	(Portugal) Pedro Correia	Resigned	3 March 2014	18th	(Portugal) Jorge Casquilha	6 March 2014
Porto B	(Portugal) Luís Castro	Took over Porto's first team	5 March 2014	1st	(Portugal) José Guilherme	6 March 2014
Moreirense	(Portugal) Vítor Oliveira	Resigned	10 March 2014	2nd	(Portugal) Toni	10 March 2014
Portimonense	(Angola) Lázaro Oliveira	Mutual consent	21 April 2014	7th	(Portugal) José Augusto	21 April 2014
Leixões	(Portugal) Jorge Casquilha	Suspended	30 April 2014	15th	(Portugal) Manuel Monteiro	30 April 2014

== League table ==
Pos	Team	Pld	W	D	L	GF	GA	GD	Pts	Promotion or qualification
1	Moreirense (C, P)	42	21	16	5	65	25	+40	79	Promotion to Primeira Liga
2	Porto B	42	23	8	11	59	42	+17	77	Ineligible for promotion
3	Penafiel (P)	42	18	19	5	47	24	+23	73	Promotion to Primeira Liga
4	Desportivo das Aves (Q)	42	20	11	11	46	35	+11	71	Qualification to promotion play-offs
5	Benfica B	42	20	10	12	77	56	+21	70 (Note: BEN 3–1 SCP; SCP 1–1 BEN)	
6	Sporting CP B	42	20	10	12	61	50	+11	70	
7	Portimonense	42	19	10	13	58	48	+10	67 (Note: PRM 4–2 CHA; CHA 3–2 PRM)	
8	Chaves	42	19	10	13	58	56	+2	67	
9	Tondela	42	16	11	15	41	38	+3	59	
10	Farense	42	15	12	15	45	44	+1	57	
11	Académico de Viseu	42	16	6	20	43	43	0	54 (Note: ACV 1–0 BEM; BEM 1–0 ACV)	
12	Beira-Mar	42	14	12	16	45	48	−3	54	
13	União da Madeira	42	14	10	18	50	46	+4	52	
14	Feirense	42	10	20	12	41	46	−5	50	
15	Santa Clara	42	13	9	20	38	46	−8	48 (Note: STC 1–1 SCO; SCO 0–1 STC)	
16	Sporting da Covilhã	42	13	9	20	34	50	−16	48	
17	Leixões	42	13	8	21	42	57	−15	47 (Note: LEI 9-3: 9 pts; OLI 3-5: 4 pts; TRO 1-4: 4 pts)	
18	Oliveirense	42	13	8	21	56	76	−20	47	
19	Trofense	42	11	14	17	36	61	−25	47	
20	Braga B	42	12	8	22	47	60	−13	44	
21	Marítimo B	42	11	10	21	39	57	−18	43	
22	Atlético CP (Note: Atlético stayed in the 2014–15 Segunda Liga after being invited by the Portuguese League for Professional Football (LPFP) as the 2014–15 Primeira Liga competition was expanded to 18 teams, because Boavista was reintegrated, along with the expansion of the 2014–15 Segunda Liga competition to 24 teams and also to the impossibility of a 4th place club from the 2013–14 Campeonato Nacional de Seniores to be promoted.)	42	9	13	20	34	54	−20	40	

Source: Segunda Liga
Rules for classification: 1) points; 2) head-to-head points; 3) head-to-head goal difference; 4) head-to-head goals scored; 5) goal difference; 6) number of goals scored.
(C) Champions; (P) Promoted; (Q) Qualified for the phase indicated

=== Positions by round ===
Team ╲ Round	1	2	3	4	5	6	7	8	9	10	11	12	13	14	15	16	17	18	19	20	21	22	23	24	25	26	27	28	29	30	31	32	33	34	35	36	37	38	39	40	41	42
Moreirense	3	1	1	1	3	4	1	1	1	1	1	1	1	1	1	2	2	2	2	2	2	2	2	1	1	1	1	1	1	1	2	2	2	2	1	2	1	1	1	1	1	1
Porto B	5	4	3	3	1	1	2	2	2	2	3	5	4	4	5	5	4	6	3	3	3	3	4	2	2	3	3	3	3	2	1	1	1	1	2	1	2	3	2	2	2	2
Penafiel	7	7	2	2	2	3	6	7	7	6	5	3	3	2	3	3	3	5	7	6	6	8	6	6	4	2	2	2	2	3	3	4	4	4	3	4	4	2	3	3	3	3
Desportivo das Aves	19	16	12	13	16	19	17	15	11	12	14	15	12	13	12	10	9	10	13	11	12	14	12	9	8	7	6	7	7	6	6	7	7	6	7	7	7	6	6	6	4	4
Benfica B	11	13	16	12	13	8	12	13	10	7	6	6	9	8	9	7	10	8	10	9	10	7	5	5	3	4	4	4	5	4	4	3	3	3	4	3	3	4	4	4	5	5
Sporting CP B	15	9	14	9	14	11	14	16	14	9	8	7	5	5	4	4	6	4	6	8	4	4	3	4	6	5	8	5	6	7	7	6	6	8	6	6	5	5	5	5	6	6
Portimonense	1	8	9	14	10	6	3	3	3	3	4	2	2	3	2	1	1	1	1	1	1	1	1	3	5	6	5	6	4	5	5	5	5	5	5	5	6	7	7	7	8	7
Chaves	7	2	8	4	8	12	9	11	15	15	13	11	11	12	11	13	14	13	12	13	15	13	10	12	11	12	11	12	10	9	9	9	9	7	9	9	9	8	8	8	7	8
Tondela	6	5	7	11	7	10	7	4	6	8	9	9	7	7	6	6	5	3	5	5	8	6	8	8	9	8	7	8	8	8	8	8	8	9	8	8	8	9	9	9	9	9
Farense	21	22	22	21	22	22	22	19	21	20	21	20	18	17	14	15	12	12	11	12	13	12	14	12	10	10	11	11	13	12	11	11	11	11	12	12	11	11	11	11	10	10
Académico de Viseu	19	21	20	17	17	18	19	21	20	21	20	21	21	21	19	20	17	17	17	17	17	17	19	17	17	17	16	13	11	10	10	10	10	10	10	10	10	10	10	10	11	11
Beira-Mar	13	20	19	19	20	21	21	20	18	19	19	17	15	11	15	12	15	14	15	15	14	15	15	16	16	13	15	17	15	15	13	13	14	13	13	13	13	12	13	13	13	12
União da Madeira	3	2	6	7	12	15	15	12	9	10	11	13	16	15	13	16	13	15	14	14	11	10	11	13	14	16	13	10	12	13	15	14	12	12	11	11	12	13	12	12	12	13
Feirense	21	17	21	20	21	17	18	18	19	17	16	19	20	20	20	22	21	18	18	18	20	18	18	19	18	18	18	18	18	18	16	15	15	15	15	14	14	14	14	14	14	14
Santa Clara	15	19	15	16	11	14	13	14	16	13	15	14	17	18	18	19	20	21	22	20	19	20	17	18	19	19	19	19	19	19	19	19	19	19	18	19	17	15	15	17	15	15
Sporting da Covilhã	15	18	13	8	5	2	4	5	4	4	7	8	6	6	8	8	7	7	4	4	7	5	7	7	7	9	9	9	9	11	12	12	13	14	14	15	15	17	16	19	16	16
Leixões	1	9	10	6	4	7	5	6	8	11	12	10	10	10	10	11	11	11	9	7	9	11	13	14	15	15	17	14	16	16	18	18	18	18	20	18	19	16	18	15	18	17
Oliveirense	15	14	18	22	18	16	16	17	17	18	18	16	14	16	17	17	19	20	21	22	22	22	22	22	21	21	21	20	20	20	20	20	21	20	19	20	21	21	17	20	17	18
Trofense	11	14	17	18	19	20	20	22	22	22	22	22	22	22	22	21	22	22	20	19	18	19	20	20	20	20	20	21	21	21	21	21	20	21	21	21	20	19	19	16	19	19
Braga B	14	11	5	9	6	9	8	9	12	14	10	12	13	14	16	14	16	16	16	16	16	16	16	15	13	14	14	16	14	14	17	17	17	17	17	16	18	20	21	18	20	20
Marítimo B	7	11	11	15	15	13	10	8	5	5	2	4	8	9	7	9	8	9	8	10	5	9	9	10	10	11	12	15	17	17	14	16	16	16	16	17	16	18	20	21	21	21
Atlético CP	7	5	4	5	9	5	11	10	13	16	17	18	19	19	21	18	18	19	19	21	21	21	21	21	22	22	22	22	22	22	22	22	22	22	22	22	22	22	22	22	22	22

Leader/Promoted
2nd place/Promoted

Updated to match(es) played on 11 May 2014. Source: LPFP.pt (in Portuguese)

== Results ==
Home \ Away	ACV	ACP	BEM	BEN	BRA	CHA	DAV	FAR	FEI	LEI	MAR	MOR	OLI	PEN	PTM	POR	STC	SCP	SCO	TON	TRO	UNI
Académico de Viseu		3–0	1–0	1–2	0–1	1–2	3–0	3–0	1–1	2–0	2–0	0–2	3–0	1–0	3–0	0–1	0–1	1–0	1–0	2–1	0–1	1–0
Atlético CP	1–0		0–0	0–1	1–0	1–3	1–0	0–2	1–0	0–1	0–2	0–1	0–0	0–0	1–0	0–1	2–2	1–0	0–1	0–0	1–1	2–1
Beira-Mar	1–0	3–2		2–2	1–0	1–0	1–1	2–1	1–1	0–0	2–0	1–3	1–0	0–1	0–1	2–3	0–2	0–1	3–0	0–0	3–0	0–0
Benfica B	5–1	2–3	4–2		2–0	2–1	0–0	0–2	0–2	5–1	2–1	1–2	4–3	0–2	3–0	3–1	2–1	3–1	4–0	2–2	5–0	4–4
Braga B	1–0	2–1	2–4	1–3		3–2	2–2	3–0	2–2	1–2	4–2	0–0	4–3	1–1	0–1	1–0	1–2	0–1	3–0	1–2	1–2	2–0
Chaves	1–2	0–0	1–1	3–1	1–1		2–1	1–1	1–1	2–0	1–0	0–1	3–0	3–2	3–2	2–1	1–0	2–3	0–2	1–2	1–2	3–0
Desportivo das Aves	4–2	3–2	0–1	0–0	1–1	0–2		2–0	1–0	1–0	2–0	1–0	1–0	0–1	0–0	0–1	1–0	0–0	1–0	1–0	4–1	0–2
Farense	1–1	1–1	1–2	3–1	2–0	1–2	0–0		1–2	1–0	2–1	0–0	4–0	0–1	2–1	1–0	3–1	4–1	2–0	0–0	1–0	1–1
Feirense	0–3	1–1	2–2	1–1	1–0	1–1	0–1	0–1		2–1	2–0	0–4	2–3	1–1	1–1	2–2	1–1	1–2	1–1	2–0	0–0	1–0
Leixões	0–0	3–3	0–1	1–2	1–0	1–2	0–1	0–0	3–0		3–2	1–1	2–3	0–2	3–3	0–2	1–0	3–0	1–0	1–0	1–0	1–1
Marítimo B	1–1	2–1	1–1	1–0	2–1	1–1	3–3	1–0	0–0	2–1		1–1	2–3	0–0	0–1	2–0	2–1	1–3	1–0	0–0	1–0	0–2
Moreirense	2–0	2–1	1–0	1–1	1–0	7–0	0–2	2–1	0–0	2–0	0–0		0–1	1–1	3–0	1–2	1–1	0–0	0–0	1–0	4–0	3–0
Oliveirense	0–2	3–2	3–1	1–2	4–0	1–1	1–1	2–0	1–0	0–3	2–2	2–2		0–0	0–3	1–4	2–2	2–3	2–1	3–2	0–1	3–2
Penafiel	3–0	0–0	0–0	1–1	1–0	1–2	1–1	3–1	1–1	3–0	1–0	1–1	1–0		0–0	1–0	3–1	2–0	0–2	1–1	1–1	1–1
Portimonense	4–0	4–0	2–0	0–2	1–1	4–2	1–0	3–0	1–1	3–0	2–1	1–1	1–0	2–1		0–1	0–1	2–0	2–1	1–1	2–0	2–1
Porto B	3–2	1–0	1–0	4–1	3–2	1–2	0–1	1–1	2–1	2–1	2–0	0–0	1–2	0–0	2–0		2–1	2–1	1–2	1–0	2–1	2–1
Santa Clara	1–0	2–1	2–3	0–2	0–1	0–1	1–2	2–0	0–2	2–0	2–1	0–1	1–0	1–2	0–0	1–1		1–0	1–1	0–1	0–0	1–0
Sporting CP B	0–0	3–0	3–1	1–1	2–0	4–0	1–2	3–3	1–1	1–1	2–0	3–2	3–2	0–1	3–2	3–3	2–1		1–0	0–1	1–0	0–0
Sporting da Covilhã	1–0	0–3	1–0	2–0	2–0	1–1	2–0	0–1	1–1	1–0	1–0	1–2	2–2	0–0	1–1	0–1	0–1	0–2		1–0	1–4	1–1
Tondela	0–0	2–0	2–1	2–0	2–1	0–1	1–2	0–0	2–0	0–1	2–1	0–1	1–0	0–3	3–0	1–1	2–1	1–2	1–3		2–0	2–1
Trofense	1–0	1–1	1–1	0–0	1–1	0–0	1–3	1–0	0–1	0–3	3–1	1–7	3–0	0–0	3–4	1–1	0–0	1–1	1–0	1–1		1–0
União da Madeira	1–0	0–0	2–0	2–1	1–2	2–0	1–0	0–0	0–2	4–1	0–1	1–1	2–0	1–2	3–0	1–0	1–0	2–3	4–1	0–1	4–0	

Source: Segunda Liga
Legend: Blue = home team win; Yellow = draw; Red = away team win.

== Season statistics ==
=== Top goalscorers ===
Rank	Player	Club	Goals
1	(Portugal) Pires	Moreirense	22
2	(Portugal) Tó Zé	Porto B	21
3	(Portugal) Ricardo Esgaio	Sporting B	16
3	(Portugal) Rui Lima	Oliveirense	16
5	(Cape Verde) Cafú	Académico de Viseu	15
6	(Portugal) Luis Pinto	Chaves	14
6	(Portugal) Moreira	Leixões	14
6	(Portugal) Luis Barry	Chaves	14
9	(Argentina) Funes Mori	Benfica B	13
10	(Brazil) Arthuro	União da Madeira	12
10	(Cape Verde) Kuca Alves	Chaves	12
10	(Portugal) Pedro Pereira	Desportivo das Aves	12

Updated: 12 May 2014, 00:16 (UTC)

=== Hat-tricks ===
Player	For	Against	Result	Date
(Portugal) Ivan Cavaleiro	Benfica B	Académico de Viseu	5–1	6 October 2013
(Portugal) Ricardo Pessoa	Portimonense	Leixões	3–3	23 October 2013
(Portugal) Rui Lima	Oliveirense	União da Madeira	3–2	27 October 2013
(Portugal) Ricardo Esgaio	Sporting CP B	Chaves	4–0	6 November 2013
(Cape Verde) Rambé	Farense	Oliveirense	4–0	16 November 2013

== Awards ==
=== Monthly awards ===
==== SJPF Segunda Liga Player of the Month ====
Month	Player	Club
August	(Portugal) Ivan Cavaleiro	Benfica B
September	(Portugal) Ivan Cavaleiro	Benfica B
October	(Portugal) Bernardo Silva	Benfica B
November	(Cape Verde) Rambé	Farense
December	(Portugal) Bernardo Silva	Benfica B
January	(Portugal) Bernardo Silva	Benfica B
February	(Portugal) Vítor Bruno	Penafiel
March	(Portugal) Vítor Bruno	Penafiel
April	(Portugal) Jorge Pires	Moreirense

==== SJPF Segunda Liga Young Player of the Month ====
Month	Player	Club
August	(Portugal) Rafael Lopes	Penafiel
September	(Portugal) Rafael Lopes	Penafiel
October	(Portugal) Mike Moura	Santa Clara
November	(Portugal) Tiago Ferreira	Porto B
December	(Portugal) Vítor Bruno	Penafiel
January	(Portugal) Bruno Loureiro	Académico de Viseu
February	(Portugal) Bruno Loureiro	Académico de Viseu
March	(Portugal) Gonçalo Paciência	Porto B
April	(Portugal) Pité	Beira-Mar

== Attendances ==
#	Club	Average
1	Moreirense	1,358
2	Viseu	1,077
3	Leixões	1,069
4	Penafiel	1,051
5	Portimonense	1,041
6	Farense	980
7	Chaves	955
8	Sporting B	865
9	Tondela	763
10	Feirense	731
11	Trofense	723
12	Beira-Mar	720
13	Benfica B	662
14	CF União	608
15	Porto B	590
16	Santa Clara	565
17	Aves	558
18	Braga B	517
19	Marítimo B	500
20	Oliveirense	499
21	Atlético CP	403
22	Covilhã	377
