= 2011–12 Liga de Honra =

22nd season of second-tier football league in Portugal

Liga de Honra
- Season: 2011–12
- Champions: Estoril Praia (2nd title)
- Promoted: Estoril Praia; Moreirense
- Matches: 240
- Goals: 554 (2.31 per match)
- Top goalscorer: Joeano (19)

The 2011–12 Liga de Honra, also known as Liga Orangina due to sponsorship reasons, was the 22nd season of the second-tier of football in Portugal. A total of 16 teams contested the league, 12 of which already had contested it in the 2009–10, and two of which were promoted from the Portuguese Second Division, and two of which were relegated from the 2010–11 Primeira Liga.

== Teams ==
=== Changes in 2011–12 ===
Location of teams in Liga Orangina 2011–12
Location of teams in Liga Orangina 2011–12
Location of teams in Liga Orangina 2011–12

Teams relegated from 2010–11 Primeira Liga

- 15th Place: Portimonense
- 16th Place: Naval

Teams promoted to 2011–12 Primeira Liga

- Champions: Gil Vicente
- Runners-up: Feirense

Teams promoted from 2010–11 Segunda Divisão

- Champions: União da Madeira
- Runners-up: Atlético CP

Teams relegated to 2011–12 Segunda Divisão

- 15th Place: Varzim
- 16th Place: Fátima

=== Stadia and locations ===
Club	City	Stadium	Capacity	2010–11
Arouca	Arouca	Estádio Municipal de Arouca	2,500	5th
Atlético CP	Lisbon	Estádio da Tapadinha	15,000	2nd (Segunda Divisão)
Belenenses	Lisbon	Estádio do Restelo	32,500	12th
Desportivo das Aves	Vila das Aves	Estádio do CD das Aves	10,250	8th
Estoril Praia	Estoril	Estádio António Coimbra da Mota	8,000	10th
Freamunde	Freamunde	Complexo Desportivo do SC Freamunde	5,000	11th
Leixões	Matosinhos	Estádio do Mar	16,035	6th
Moreirense	Moreira de Cónegos	Parque de Jogos Comendador Joaquim de Almeida Freitas	9,000	7th
Naval	Figueira da Foz	Estádio Municipal José Bento Pessoa	12,630	16th (Primeira Liga)
Oliveirense	Oliveira de Azeméis	Estádio Carlos Osório	9,100	4th
Penafiel	Penafiel	Estádio Municipal 25 de Abril	7,000	13th
Portimonense	Portimão	Estádio Municipal de Portimão	9,554	15th (Primeira Liga)
Santa Clara	Ponta Delgada	Estádio de São Miguel	15,277	9th
Sporting da Covilhã	Covilhã	Complexo Desportivo da Covilhã	3,000	14th
Trofense	Trofa	Estádio do Clube Desportivo Trofense	3,164	3rd
União da Madeira	Funchal	Campo do Adelino Rodrigues	3,000	1st (Segunda Divisão)

=== Personnel and kits ===
Note: Flags indicate national team as has been defined under FIFA eligibility rules. Players and Managers may hold more than one non-FIFA nationality.

Team	Head coach	Captain	Kit manufacturer	Shirt sponsor
Arouca	(Portugal) Vítor Oliveira		Joma	Betclic / Cavadinha / Crédito Agrícola
Atlético CP	(Portugal) Paulo Pedro		Joma	Montepio Geral
Belenenses	(Portugal) Marco Paulo		Macron	BetClic / MetLife / Super Bock
Desportivo das Aves	(Portugal) Paulo Fonseca	(Canada) Pedro Pacheco	Alitecno	Freitas Transportes
Freamunde	(Portugal) Nicolau Vaqueiro	(Portugal) Bock	Joma	BetClic / Capital do Móvel
Estoril	(Portugal) Marco Silva	(Portugal) Steven Vitória	Joma	Halcon Viagens
Leixões	(Portugal) Horácio Gonçalves		SportZone	Cepsa / Fidelidade Mundial / Super Bock / Vivaci
Moreirense	(Portugal) Jorge Casquilha		Lacatoni	BetClic / Focor
Naval	(Portugal) Filó	(Portugal) Carlitos	Desportreino	Algarve Sol / BetClic / Casino Figueira da Foz / Polar
Oliveirense	(Portugal) Pedro Miguel		Macron	Grupo Simoldes
Penafiel	(Portugal) Francisco Chaló	(Portugal) Pedrinha	Desportreino	BetClic / Nortenha / Restradas / Sentir Penafiel
Portimonense	(Angola) Lázaro Oliveira		Macron	Sanipóvoa
Santa Clara	(Portugal) Luís Miguel		Lacatoni	Açoreana Seguros / BetClic
Sporting da Covilhã	(Portugal) Rui Nascimento	(Portugal) Milton	Desportreino	BetClic / Joalto
Trofense	(Portugal) João Eusébio		Lacatoni	BetClic / Trofa Saúde
União da Madeira	(Serbia) Predrag Jokanović		Macron	Lena Construções

=== Managerial changes ===
Team	Outgoing manager	Manner of departure	Date of vacancy	Position in table	Incoming manager	Date of appointment
Naval	(Brazil) Carlos Mozer	Contract expired	14 May 2011	Pre-season	(Portugal) Daniel Ramos	13 June 2011
Desportivo das Aves	(Portugal) Vítor Oliveira	Contract expired	29 May 2011	Pre-season	(Portugal) Paulo Fonseca	7 June 2011
Portimonense	(Portugal) Carlos Azenha	Resigned	30 May 2011	Pre-season	(Portugal) João Bastos	15 July 2011
União da Madeira	(Portugal) Daniel Ramos	Resigned	9 June 2011	Pre-season	(Portugal) João Abel	13 June 2011
Atlético CP	(Portugal) Toni Pereira	Contract expired	10 June 2011	Pre-season	(Portugal) João de Deus	22 June 2011
Trofense	(Portugal) Porfírio Amorim	Resigned	25 June 2011	Pre-season	(Portugal) António Sousa	15 July 2011
Arouca	(Portugal) Henrique Nunes	Mutual agreement	20 September 2011	7th	(Portugal) Vítor Oliveira	20 September 2011
Estoril	(Brazil) Vinícius Eutrópio	Sacked	27 September 2011	10th	(Portugal) Marco Silva	27 September 2011
Portimonense	(Portugal) João Bastos	Resigned	31 October 2011	16th	(Brazil) Carlos Mozer	1 November 2011
União da Madeira	(Portugal) João Abel	Resigned	8 November 2011	15th	(Serbia) Predrag Jokanović	11 November 2011
Trofense	(Portugal) António Sousa	Resigned	30 November 2011	16th	(Portugal) João Eusébio	6 December 2011
Portimonense	(Brazil) Carlos Mozer	Mutual agreement	13 January 2012	16th	(Angola) Lázaro Oliveira	18 January 2012
Belenenses	(Portugal) José Mota	Resigned	14 February 2012	12th	(Portugal) Marco Paulo	17 February 2012
Leixões	(Portugal) Litos	Mutual agreement	14 February 2012	8th	(Portugal) Horácio Gonçalves	15 February 2012
Atlético CP	(Portugal) João de Deus	Resigned	28 February 2012	5th	(Portugal) Paulo Pedro	14 March 2012
Santa Clara	(Portugal) Bruno Moura	Mutual agreement	28 March 2012	12th	(Portugal) Luís Miguel	2 April 2012
Sporting da Covilhã	(Portugal) Tulipa	Mutual agreement	2 April 2012	16th	(Portugal) Rui Nascimento	3 April 2012
Naval	(Portugal) Daniel Ramos	Sacked	2 April 2012	4th	(Portugal) Filó	4 April 2012

== League table ==
Pos	Team	Pld	W	D	L	GF	GA	GD	Pts	Promotion
1	Estoril Praia (C, P)	30	16	9	5	40	20	+20	57	Promotion to Primeira Liga
2	Moreirense (P)	30	15	7	8	47	32	+15	52	Promotion to Primeira Liga
3	Desportivo das Aves	30	12	14	4	38	23	+15	50	
4	Naval 1º de Maio	30	12	10	8	40	33	+7	46	
5	Belenenses	30	10	11	9	34	32	+2	41	
6	Oliveirense	30	10	9	11	39	38	+1	39 (Note: TRO 0–0 OLI; OLI 5–0 TRO)	
7	Trofense	30	11	6	13	36	45	−9	39	
8	Penafiel	30	10	8	12	33	36	−3	38	
9	Atlético CP	30	9	10	11	27	37	−10	37 (Note: CFU 1–1 ACP; ACP 1–1 CFU)	
10	União da Madeira	30	9	10	11	35	40	−5	37	
11	Leixões (Note: Leixões were deducted 3 points due to inability to pay salaries on time.)	30	11	7	12	32	34	−2	37	
12	Santa Clara	30	8	10	12	29	38	−9	34 (Note: STC: 3–2, 7 pts; FCA: 1–0, 5 pts; FRM: 3–3, 4 pts)	
13	Arouca	30	7	13	10	32	36	−4	34	
14	Freamunde	30	7	13	10	35	40	−5	34	
15	Sporting da Covilhã (Note: Covilhã were invited to remain in the Liga de Honra after Leiria were forbidden to play due to debts.)	30	7	11	12	22	29	−7	32 (Note: SCO 2–0 PRM; PRM 2–1 SCO)	
16	Portimonense (Note: Portimonense were invited to remain in the Liga de Honra after Second Division champions Varzim declined to play due to debts.)	30	8	8	14	35	42	−7	32	

Rules for classification: 1) points; 2) goal difference; 3) number of goals scored.
(C) Champions; (P) Promoted

=== Positions by round ===
Team ╲ Round	1	2	3	4	5	6	7	8	9	10	11	12	13	14	15	16	17	18	19	20	21	22	23	24	25	26	27	28	29	30
Estoril	7	13	11	11	11	15	10	12	8	5	3	1	1	1	1	1	1	1	1	1	1	1	1	1	1	1	1	1	1	1
Moreirense	1	6	6	12	12	9	3	5	4	3	2	3	4	2	2	2	2	3	3	3	2	3	3	3	2	3	2	2	2	2
Desportivo das Aves	13	6	6	9	10	4	9	9	5	9	9	7	5	3	3	3	3	2	2	2	3	2	2	2	3	2	3	3	3	3
Naval 1º de Maio	14	16	13	12	7	11	12	7	10	8	8	6	7	7	6	6	4	4	4	4	4	4	4	4	4	5	4	4	4	4
Belenenses	7	12	12	6	3	5	5	10	12	13	16	13	13	14	15	13	10	11	11	12	14	14	12	13	11	10	9	6	6	5
Leixões	4	9	6	3	2	2	6	11	7	4	7	4	2	4	5	5	6	9	7	7	5	7	7	5	5	4	5	5	5	6
Oliveirense	1	5	5	2	5	8	11	6	9	6	5	9	6	6	7	9	11	8	9	10	12	11	11	9	8	7	6	7	9	7
Trofense	5	14	15	16	14	12	14	15	15	16	15	16	14	12	13	15	13	13	12	15	11	10	10	8	6	8	8	10	10	8
Penafiel	5	11	4	4	8	3	2	2	2	7	6	10	11	11	9	7	8	7	6	6	7	6	6	7	9	6	7	9	7	9
União da Madeira	3	1	2	5	9	14	15	14	14	15	13	15	16	15	12	14	15	15	13	11	10	12	13	14	14	13	14	13	11	10
Atlético CP	7	4	1	1	1	1	1	1	1	1	1	2	3	5	4	4	5	5	8	5	6	5	5	6	7	9	10	8	8	11
Santa Clara	7	3	6	9	6	10	4	4	3	2	4	5	8	9	10	10	9	10	10	9	9	9	9	12	10	11	12	12	12	12
Arouca	7	2	3	7	4	7	12	13	13	11	12	12	10	10	11	8	7	6	5	8	8	8	8	10	12	12	11	11	13	13
Freamunde	15	6	6	8	12	6	8	3	6	10	11	11	12	13	14	12	14	14	15	13	13	13	14	11	13	14	15	15	15	14
Sporting da Covilhã	7	15	16	14	15	13	7	8	11	12	10	8	9	8	8	11	12	12	14	14	15	15	15	15	16	16	16	16	16	15
Portimonense	15	10	14	15	16	16	16	16	16	14	14	14	15	16	16	16	16	16	16	16	16	16	16	16	15	15	13	14	14	16

Updated to match(es) played on 13 May 2012. Source:
= Leader/Promoted; = 2nd place/Promoted; = 3rd place

== Results ==
Home \ Away	ARO	ACP	BEL	DAV	ESP	FRM	LEI	MOR	NAV	OLI	PEN	PTM	STC	SCO	TRO	UNI
Arouca		2–0	2–0	2–2	1–4	0–0	1–1	3–1	1–2	3–3	0–2	1–2	1–0	1–1	2–0	0–0
Atlético CP	1–0		0–2	0–0	1–0	2–2	1–0	2–3	1–0	2–0	1–1	0–1	0–0	0–0	3–0	1–1
Belenenses	3–0	0–0		0–0	2–2	1–0	1–0	1–0	0–1	2–1	2–0	1–1	2–1	0–0	1–3	1–1
Desportivo das Aves	2–0	3–1	3–1		2–0	0–0	1–3	0–0	1–1	1–0	2–0	1–1	2–2	1–0	3–1	1–1
Estoril Praia	2–2	5–0	1–0	1–0		3–0	1–1	1–0	2–0	0–0	1–1	1–0	0–0	0–0	0–2	1–0
Freamunde	2–0	2–2	2–1	1–2	2–2		2–1	1–1	1–1	3–0	1–0	2–2	1–2	2–2	3–1	2–0
Leixões	0–2	0–1	0–0	0–0	0–1	2–2		2–1	0–2	1–1	2–1	1–0	1–2	1–0	2–3	1–0
Moreirense	0–2	4–1	3–2	1–1	2–1	0–0	0–1		1–1	1–0	3–1	2–0	2–0	1–1	4–1	2–0
Naval 1º de Maio	0–0	2–2	0–1	1–1	0–3	1–1	0–1	1–2		1–1	1–0	2–0	5–1	2–1	2–1	2–0
Oliveirense	2–2	2–1	3–2	1–1	0–1	2–0	2–4	2–3	3–2		2–2	1–1	1–0	2–0	5–0	1–0
Penafiel	2–1	1–0	2–2	0–1	3–1	1–0	0–1	1–0	0–0	1–0		0–3	1–1	0–1	2–0	3–1
Portimonense	0–0	0–1	2–3	1–1	0–2	2–0	2–1	1–2	2–1	0–1	3–2		2–2	2–1	2–2	1–2
Santa Clara	0–0	1–2	1–1	0–2	1–2	1–0	2–0	2–2	2–2	2–1	1–1	2–1		1–0	1–0	0–1
Sporting da Covilhã	1–0	2–0	0–0	0–2	0–1	2–1	2–2	1–2	0–2	0–1	1–0	2–0	1–0		0–0	0–2
Trofense	1–1	1–0	1–0	1–0	0–1	4–0	0–2	2–1	1–2	0–0	2–2	3–1	2–1	2–2		1–2
União da Madeira	2–2	1–1	2–2	3–2	0–0	2–2	3–1	0–3	1–3	2–1	2–3	2–1	2–0	1–1	0–1	

Legend: Blue = home team win; Yellow = draw; Red = away team win.

== Season statistics ==
=== Top goalscorers ===
Rank	Player	Club	Goals
1	(Brazil) Joeano	Arouca	19
2	(Brazil) Manoel	Penafiel	14
3	(Portugal) Pires	Desportivo das Aves	13
4	(Portugal) Licá	Estoril Praia	12
5	(Brazil) Adriano	Oliveirense	10
5	(Portugal) Bock	Freamunde	10
5	(Portugal) Bruno Moreira	Moreirense	10

=== Hat-tricks ===
Player	For	Against	Result	Date
(Brazil) Adriano	Oliveirense	Arouca	3–3	11 December 2011
(Portugal) Steven Vitória	Estoril	Arouca	1–4	14 January 2012

== Awards ==
=== Annual awards ===
==== LPFP Liga de Honra Player of the Year ====
The LPFP Liga de Honra Player of the Year was awarded to Licá.

==== LPFP Liga de Honra Breakthrough Player of the Year ====
The LPFP Liga de Honra Breakthrough Player of the Year was awarded to Miguel Rosa.

==== LPFP Liga de Honra Goalkeeper of the Year ====
The LPFP Liga de Honra Goalkeeper of the Year was awarded to Vagner.

==== LPFP Liga de Honra Manager of the Year ====
The LPFP Liga de Honra Coach of the Year was awarded to Marco Silva.

==== LPFP Liga de Honra Fairplay Award ====
The LPFP Liga de Honra Fairplay Award was awarded to Moreirense.

== See also ==
- 2011–12 Primeira Liga
- 2011–12 Segunda Divisão
