= SJPF Segunda Liga Player of the Month =

The SJPF Segunda Liga Player of the Month (often called Second League Player of the Month) is an association football award that recognizes the best Segunda Liga player each month of the season and is conceived by the SJPF (syndicate of professional football players). The award has been presented since the 2010–11 season and the recipient is based on individual scores assigned by the three national sports dailies, A Bola, Record, and O Jogo. Miguel Rosa has won the award most on different eight occasions.

Prior to the start 2012–13 Segunda Liga season, the SJPF announced that the SJPF Segunda Liga Player of the Month award would be awarded to a player on a bimonthly status with one player receiving an award for two months of football that have been played. The awards would be awarded during the following periods:

- August and September (Awarded to the Player of the Month in relation to football being played between Gameweek 1 to Gameweek 8)
- October and November (Awarded to the Player of the Month in relation to football being played between Gameweek 9 to Gameweek 15)
- December (Awarded to the Player of the Month in relation to football being played between Gameweek 16 to Gameweek 20)
- January (Awarded to the Player of the Month in relation to football being played between Gameweek 21 to Gameweek 25)
- February (Awarded to the Player of the Month in relation to football being played between Gameweek 26 to Gameweek 29)
- March (Awarded to the Player of the Month in relation to football being played between Gameweek 30 to Gameweek 33)
- April (Awarded to the Player of the Month in relation to football being played between Gameweek 34 to Gameweek 38)

== Winners ==
Key

†	Award was shared with another player
GK	Goalkeeper
DF	Defender
MF	Midfielder
FW	Forward

Month	Year	Nationality	Player	Team	Position	Ref
September	2007	Portugal	Marinho	Fátima	FW	
October	2007	Portugal	Toy	Olhanense	FW	
November	2007	Portugal	José Gaspar	Rio Ave	DF	
December	2007	Portugal	Hélder Sousa	Vizela	MF	
January	2008	Portugal	Paulo Lopes	Trofense	GK	
February	2008	Portugal	Pedro Ribeiro	Gil Vicente	DF	
March	2008	Portugal	Maciel Neto	Gil Vicente	FW	
April	2008	Portugal	Luís Coentrão	Gil Vicente	MF	
September	2008	Portugal	Ricardo Sousa	Beira-Mar	MF	
October	2008	Brazil	Igor Souza	Gil Vicente	FW	
November	2008	Portugal	Nuno Santos	Gondomar	GK	
December	2008	Brazil	Fernando Prass	União de Leiria	GK	
January	2009	Brazil	Cássio Vargas	União de Leiria	FW	
February	2009	Portugal	Márcio Ramos	Estoril	GK	
March	2009	Brazil	Djalmir	Olhanense	FW	
April	2009	Brazil	Carlão	União de Leiria	FW	
May	2009	Portugal	Nuno Laranjeira	Oliveirense	DF	
September	2009	Portugal	Pedro Pereira	Desportivo das Aves	FW	
October	2009	Portugal	Paulo Santos	Estoril	GK	
November	2009	Portugal	Basílio Almeida	Sporting da Covilhã	FW	
December	2009	Portugal	Rui Sampaio	Beira-Mar	MF	
January	2010	Portugal	Bock	Freamunde	FW	
February	2010	Portugal	Cícero Semedo	Oliveirense	FW	
March	2010	Brazil	Maurício Fernandes	Feirense	DF	
April	2010	Portugal				
September	2010	Portugal	Tiago Costa	Estoril	MF	
October	2010	Portugal	André Cunha	Gil Vicente	MF	
November	2010	Portugal	Bock	Freamunde	FW	
December	2010	Portugal	Zé Manel	Trofense	FW	
January	2011	Portugal	Chico Silva	Oliveirense	DF	
February	2011	Portugal	Bock	Freamunde	FW	
March	2011	Ivory Coast	Siaka Bamba	Feirense	MF	
April	2011	Portugal	Carlos Fonseca	Feirense	FW	
September	2011	Cape Verde	Laurindo	Atlético CP	MF	
October	2011	Portugal	Nélson Pedroso	Desportivo das Aves	DF	
November	2011	Portugal	Pedro Santos	Leixões	FW	
December	2011	Portugal	Licá	Estoril	FW	
January	2012	Portugal	Steven Vitória	Estoril	DF	
February	2012	Portugal	Licá	Estoril	FW	
March	2012	Portugal	Jorge Pires	Desportivo das Aves	FW	
April	2012	Brazil	Wágner	Moreirense	FW	
August	2012	Portugal	Miguel Rosa	Benfica B	MF	
September	2012	Portugal	Miguel Rosa	Benfica B	MF	
October	2012	Portugal	Miguel Rosa	Benfica B	MF	
November	2012	Portugal	Miguel Rosa	Benfica B	MF	
December	2012	Portugal	Rabiola	Desportivo das Aves	FW	
January	2013	Portugal	Miguel Rosa	Benfica B	MF	
February	2013	Portugal	Miguel Rosa	Benfica B	MF	
March	2013	Portugal	Miguel Rosa	Benfica B	MF	
April	2013	Portugal	Miguel Rosa	Benfica B	MF	
August	2013	Portugal	Ivan Cavaleiro	Benfica B	FW	
September	2013	Portugal	Ivan Cavaleiro	Benfica B	FW	
October	2013	Portugal	Bernardo Silva	Benfica B	MF	
November	2013	Cape Verde	Rambé	Farense	FW	
December	2013	Portugal	Bernardo Silva	Benfica B	MF	
January	2014	Portugal	Bernardo Silva	Benfica B	MF	
February	2014	Portugal	Vítor Bruno	Penafiel	MF	
March	2014	Portugal	Vítor Bruno	Penafiel	MF	
April	2014	Portugal	Jorge Pires	Moreirense	FW	
August	2014	Norway	Bjørn Johnsen	Atlético CP	FW	
September	2014	Norway	Bjørn Johnsen	Atlético CP	FW	
October	2014	Portugal	Gonçalo Guedes	Benfica B	FW	
November	2014	Brazil	Rafael Crivellaro	Vitória de Guimarães B	MF	
December	2014	Portugal	Gonçalo Guedes	Benfica B	FW	
January	2015	Portugal	Tozé Marreco	Tondela	FW	
February	2015	Portugal	Gonçalo Paciência	Porto B	FW	
March	2015	France	Frédéric Mendy	União da Madeira	FW	
April	2015	Portugal	Tozé Marreco	Tondela	FW	

== Statistics ==
=== Awards won by club ===
Club	Wins
Benfica B	15
Estoril	6
Gil Vicente	5
Desportivo das Aves	4
Atlético CP	3
Feirense	3
Freamunde	3
Oliveirense	3
União de Leiria	3
Beira-Mar	2
Moreirense	2
Olhanense	2
Penafiel	2
Tondela	2
Farense	1
Fátima	1
Gondomar	1
Leixões	1
Olhanense	1
Porto B	1
Rio Ave	1
Sporting da Covilhã	1
Trofense	1
União da Madeira	1
Vitória de Guimarães B	1
Vizela	1

=== Awards won by nationality ===
Country	Wins
Portugal	53
Brazil	8
Cape Verde	2
United States	2
France	1
Ivory Coast	1

=== Multiple winners ===
Rank	Player	Wins
1st	Miguel Rosa	8
2nd	Bernardo Silva	3
2nd	Bock	3
3rd	Bjørn Johnsen	2
3rd	Gonçalo Guedes	2
3rd	Ivan Cavaleiro	2
3rd	Jorge Pires	2
3rd	Licá	2
3rd	Tozé Marreco	2
3rd	Vítor Bruno	2

=== Awards won by position ===
Position	Wins
Forward	33
Midfielder	22
Defender	7
Goalkeeper	3

== See also ==
- SJPF Player of the Month
- SJPF Young Player of the Month
