= 2010–11 Primeira Liga =

77th season of top-tier Portuguese football

Primeira Liga
- Season: 2010–11
- Dates: 13 August 2010 – 14 May 2011
- Champions: Porto; 25th title
- Relegated: Portimonense; Naval 1º de Maio
- Champions League: Porto; Benfica
- Europa League: Sporting CP; Braga; Vitória de Guimarães; Nacional
- Matches: 240
- Goals: 584 (2.43 per match)
- Best Player: Hulk
- Top goalscorer: Hulk (23 goals)
- Best goalkeeper: Helton
- Biggest home win: Porto 5–0 Benfica; Braga 5–0 Académica
- Biggest away win: P. Ferreira 1–6 Rio Ave
- Highest scoring: Benfica 5–2 Rio Ave; Portimonense 3–4 V. Setúbal; P. Ferreira 1–6 Rio Ave
- Longest winning run: Porto 16 games (6 December 2010 – 1 May 2011)
- Longest unbeaten run: Porto 30 games (14 August 2010 – 14 May 2011)
- Longest losing run: Rio Ave 5 games (18 December 2010 – 6 February 2011)
- Highest attendance: Benfica 2–1 Marítimo (54,991) (27 February 2011)
- Lowest attendance: Naval 1–1 Portimonense (316) (22 January 2011)
- Total attendance: 2,419,683
- Average attendance: 10,082

The 2010–11 Primeira Liga (also known as Liga ZON Sagres for sponsorship reasons) was the 77th season of the Primeira Liga, the top professional league for Portuguese association football clubs. It began on 15 August 2010 and ended on 14 May 2011. A total of 16 teams contested the league, 14 of which already took part in the previous season and two of which were promoted from the Liga de Honra. Benfica were the defending champions but finished runners-up to Porto, who won their 25th league title in the club's first-ever unbeaten season. Porto's forward Hulk was the top scorer with 23 goals.

== Teams ==
Belenenses and Leixões were relegated at the end of the 2009–10 season after finishing in the bottom two places of the table. Belenenses ended an 11-year spell at the highest level of Portuguese football, while Leixões returned to the Liga de Honra after three years.

The two relegated teams were replaced by Liga de Honra champions Beira-Mar and runners-up Portimonense. Beira-Mar returned to the top-level league after three years of absence, and Portimonense made their first appearance in their league since being relegated at the end of the 1989–90 season.

=== Team summaries ===
Location of teams in Liga Zon Sagres 2010–11
Location of teams in Liga Zon Sagres 2010–11

Club	City	Stadium	Capacity	2009–10 season
Académica	Coimbra	Estádio Cidade de Coimbra	30,210	11th
Beira-Mar	Aveiro	Estádio Municipal de Aveiro	30,127	Liga de Honra Champion
Benfica	Lisbon	Estádio da Luz	65,400	Champion
Braga	Braga	Estádio Municipal de Braga	30,152	Runner-up
Marítimo	Funchal	Estádio dos Barreiros	8,922	5th
Nacional	Funchal	Estádio da Madeira	5,132	7th
Naval 1º de Maio	Figueira da Foz	Estádio Municipal José Bento Pessoa	12,630	8th
Olhanense	Olhão	Estádio José Arcanjo	10,000	13th
Paços de Ferreira	Paços de Ferreira	Estádio da Mata Real	5,255	10th
Portimonense	Portimão	Estádio Municipal de Portimão	9,544	Liga de Honra Runner-up
Porto	Porto	Estádio do Dragão	50,399	3rd
Rio Ave	Vila do Conde	Estádio dos Arcos	12,815	12th
Sporting CP	Lisbon	Estádio José Alvalade	50,080	4th
União de Leiria	Leiria	Estádio Dr. Magalhães Pessoa	30,000	9th
Vitória de Guimarães	Guimarães	Estádio D. Afonso Henriques	30,165	6th
Vitória de Setúbal	Setúbal	Estádio do Bonfim	25,000	14th

=== Personnel and sponsoring ===
Team	Head coach	Captain	Kit manufacturer	Shirt sponsor
Académica de Coimbra	(Portugal) Ulisses Morais	(Portugal) Orlando	Lacatoni	EFAPEL
Beira-Mar	(Portugal) Rui Bento	(Portugal) Hugo	Joma	Diatosta
Benfica	(Portugal) Jorge Jesus	(Portugal) Nuno Gomes	Adidas	tmn · meo
Sporting de Braga	(Portugal) Domingos Paciência	(Brazil) Vandinho	Macron	AXA
Marítimo	(Portugal) Pedro Martins	(Brazil) João Guilherme	Lacatoni	Banif
Nacional	(Portugal) Ivo Vieira	(Portugal) Bruno Patacas	Joma	Banif
Naval 1º de Maio	(Brazil) Carlos Mozer	(France) Nicolas Godemèche	Desportreino	Hotéis Algarve Sol
Olhanense	(Mozambique) Daúto Faquirá	(Portugal) Rui Duarte	Lacatoni	Ria Shopping
Paços de Ferreira	(Portugal) Rui Vitória	(Portugal) Manuel José	Lacatoni	Capital do Móvel
Portimonense	(Portugal) Carlos Azenha	(Portugal) Ricardo Pessoa	Macron	Kia · visitportimao.com
Porto	(Portugal) André Villas-Boas	(Brazil) Helton	Nike	tmn · meo
Rio Ave	(Portugal) Carlos Brito	(Portugal) Gaspar	Lacatoni	Nassica
Sporting CP	(Portugal) José Couceiro	(Portugal) Daniel Carriço	Puma	tmn · meo
União de Leiria	(Portugal) Pedro Caixinha	(Cape Verde) Marco Soares	Joma	Kia
Vitória de Guimarães	(Portugal) Manuel Machado	(Brazil) Nilson	Lacatoni	Finibanco
Vitória de Setúbal	(Portugal) Bruno Ribeiro	(Portugal) Ricardo Silva	Lacatoni	Kia

=== Managerial changes ===
Team	Outgoing head coach	Manner of departure	Date of vacancy	Position in table	Incoming head coach	Date of appointment
União de Leiria	(Angola) Lito Vidigal	Sacked	7 July 2010	Off-season	(Portugal) Pedro Caixinha	10 July 2010
Marítimo	(Netherlands) Mitchell van der Gaag	Sacked	14 September 2010	15th	(Portugal) Pedro Martins	14 September 2010
Naval 1º de Maio	(France) Victor Zvunka	Sacked	27 September 2010	14th	(Portugal) Rogério Gonçalves	6 October 2010
Académica	(Portugal) Jorge Costa	Resigned	21 December 2010	9th	(Portugal) José Guilherme	27 December 2010
Naval 1º de Maio	(Portugal) Rogério Gonçalves	Sacked	19 December 2010	16th	(Brazil) Carlos Mozer	30 December 2010
Portimonense	(Portugal) Litos	Sacked	28 December 2010	16th	(Portugal) Carlos Azenha	29 December 2010
Académica	(Portugal) José Guilherme	Resigned	20 February 2011	13th	(Portugal) Ulisses Morais	22 February 2011
Sporting CP	(Portugal) Paulo Sérgio	Resigned	26 February 2011	3rd	(Portugal) José Couceiro	26 February 2011
Beira-Mar	(Portugal) Leonardo Jardim	Resigned	28 February 2011	10th	(Portugal) Rui Bento	1 March 2011
Vitória de Setúbal	(Portugal) Manuel Fernandes	Sacked	1 March 2011	14th	(Portugal) Bruno Ribeiro	1 March 2011
Nacional	(Serbia) Predrag Jokanović	Sacked	13 March 2011	7th	(Portugal) Ivo Vieira	13 March 2011

== League table ==
Pos	Team	Pld	W	D	L	GF	GA	GD	Pts	Qualification or relegation
1	Porto (C)	30	27	3	0	73	16	+57	84	Qualification to Champions League group stage
2	Benfica	30	20	3	7	61	31	+30	63	Qualification to Champions League third qualifying round
3	Sporting CP	30	13	9	8	41	31	+10	48	Qualification to Europa League play-off round
4	Braga	30	13	7	10	45	33	+12	46	Qualification to Europa League play-off round
5	Vitória de Guimarães	30	12	7	11	36	37	−1	43	Qualification to Europa League third qualifying round
6	Nacional	30	11	9	10	28	31	−3	42	Qualification to Europa League second qualifying round (Note: The 2010–11 Taça de Portugal competition was won by Champions League-qualified side Porto. Since cup runners-up Vitória de Guimarães secured a place in the European competitions via league position, the spot allocation for the 2011–12 UEFA Europa League effectively reverted to league positions.)
7	Paços de Ferreira	30	10	11	9	35	42	−7	41	
8	Rio Ave	30	10	8	12	35	33	+2	38	
9	Marítimo	30	9	8	13	33	32	+1	35 (Note: Marítimo ahead of União de Leiria on head-to-head record; Marítimo–União de Leiria 1–1, União de Leiria–Marítimo 1–3)	
10	União de Leiria	30	9	8	13	25	38	−13	35	
11	Olhanense	30	7	13	10	24	34	−10	34 (Note: Olhanense ahead of Vitória de Setúbal on head-to-head record; Olhanense–Vitória de Setúbal 3–1, Vitória de Setúbal–Olhanense 0–0)	
12	Vitória de Setúbal	30	8	10	12	29	42	−13	34	
13	Beira-Mar	30	7	12	11	32	36	−4	33	
14	Académica	30	7	9	14	32	48	−16	30	
15	Portimonense (R)	30	6	7	17	29	49	−20	25	Relegation to Liga de Honra
16	Naval 1º de Maio (R)	30	5	8	17	26	51	−25	23	Relegation to Liga de Honra

Source: LPFP (in Portuguese)
Rules for classification: 1) Points; 2) Head-to-head points; 3) Head-to-head goal difference; 4) Head-to-head away goals scored; 5) Goal difference; 6) Matches won; 7) Goals scored; 8) Play-off.
(Note: LPFP decided that only criteria 1, 5, 6 and 7 would be applied to establish the classification during the competition.)
(C) Champions; (R) Relegated

=== Positions by round ===
Team ╲ Round	1	2	3	4	5	6	7	8	9	10	11	12	13	14	15	16	17	18	19	20	21	22	23	24	25	26	27	28	29	30
Porto	3	1	1	1	1	1	1	1	1	1	1	1	1	1	1	1	1	1	1	1	1	1	1	1	1	1	1	1	1	1
Benfica	11	14	11	13	8	5	2	2	2	3	2	2	2	2	2	2	2	2	2	2	2	2	2	2	2	2	2	2	2	2
Sporting CP	12	7	3	5	7	8	10	7	4	6	4	4	3	3	3	3	3	3	3	3	3	3	3	3	4	4	4	3	4	3
Braga	1	3	2	4	5	3	6	4	6	7	10	7	8	7	7	7	7	5	6	7	7	6	4	4	3	3	3	4	3	4
Vitória de Guimarães	7	10	5	2	2	4	4	5	3	2	3	3	4	5	5	4	4	4	4	4	5	5	6	5	5	6	5	7	5	5
Nacional	3	2	4	8	11	12	9	11	8	4	5	8	6	6	6	5	5	6	9	9	6	7	7	7	6	5	6	5	6	6
Paços de Ferreira	3	5	7	6	6	10	8	9	10	12	12	11	12	12	11	11	10	10	8	5	4	4	5	6	7	8	8	8	7	7
Rio Ave	12	12	15	16	16	16	16	16	15	15	15	12	13	13	14	14	14	14	14	12	11	10	11	12	9	7	7	6	8	8
Marítimo	12	15	16	15	15	15	15	14	13	13	14	14	10	11	13	9	11	12	12	11	13	13	12	10	8	9	9	9	9	9
União de Leiria	7	10	13	9	12	9	5	10	12	11	9	6	5	4	4	6	6	8	5	6	8	8	8	8	10	11	11	11	10	10
Olhanense	7	9	6	7	3	6	3	6	7	8	7	9	11	10	9	10	9	7	7	8	9	9	10	11	13	12	12	12	12	11
Vitória de Setúbal	3	5	9	12	10	7	11	8	9	10	11	13	14	14	12	13	13	13	13	14	14	14	14	14	14	14	14	14	13	12
Beira-Mar	7	13	8	11	9	13	13	12	11	9	8	10	9	8	8	8	8	9	10	10	10	11	9	9	11	10	10	10	11	13
Académica	2	4	10	3	4	2	7	3	5	5	6	5	7	9	10	12	12	11	11	13	12	12	13	13	12	13	13	13	14	14
Portimonense	16	16	14	10	13	11	12	13	14	14	15	15	15	15	15	15	15	15	16	16	16	16	15	15	16	16	16	16	15	15
Naval 1º de Maio	12	7	12	14	14	14	14	15	16	16	16	16	16	16	16	16	16	16	15	15	15	15	16	16	15	15	15	15	16	16

Leader
2nd place
3rd place

== Results ==
Home \ Away	ACA	BEM	BEN	BRA	MAR	NAC	NAV	OLH	PAÇ	PTM	POR	RAV	SCP	ULE	VGU	VSE
Académica		3–3	0–1	0–0	1–5	2–1	3–0	1–1	0–0	1–0	0–1	0–1	1–2	0–0	3–1	1–1
Beira-Mar	2–1		1–3	1–2	1–1	0–2	3–1	1–0	3–1	0–1	0–1	1–1	1–1	0–0	3–2	0–0
Benfica	1–2	2–1		1–0	2–1	4–2	4–0	2–0	2–0	1–1	1–2	5–2	2–0	3–3	3–0	3–0
Braga	5–0	2–3	2–1		1–0	2–0	3–1	3–1	1–2	3–1	0–2	1–0	0–1	0–0	3–1	2–2
Marítimo	1–0	1–0	0–1	1–2		1–1	1–0	4–0	1–1	1–1	0–2	0–1	0–3	1–1	2–0	0–1
Nacional	1–1	0–0	2–1	1–1	0–0		2–1	0–1	1–0	3–1	0–2	1–0	1–0	0–1	1–3	1–0
Naval 1º de Maio	3–1	2–2	2–1	0–0	0–3	1–2		1–1	1–2	1–1	0–1	0–1	1–3	0–3	0–3	0–0
Olhanense	2–1	1–1	1–1	0–2	1–1	0–0	1–3		0–0	2–0	0–3	2–2	2–2	1–0	0–0	3–1
Paços de Ferreira	5–1	1–1	1–5	2–2	1–0	0–1	0–0	1–0		2–2	0–3	1–6	1–0	1–1	2–1	2–0
Portimonense	2–2	1–0	0–1	0–3	1–0	1–1	0–1	1–1	0–1		2–3	3–1	1–3	1–2	2–1	3–4
Porto	3–1	3–0	5–0	3–2	4–1	3–0	3–1	2–0	3–3	2–0		1–0	3–2	5–1	2–0	1–0
Rio Ave	2–2	1–1	1–2	2–0	0–0	0–1	1–0	0–1	3–1	2–0	0–2		0–0	1–0	2–3	2–0
Sporting CP	2–0	1–0	0–2	2–1	1–0	1–1	3–3	0–0	2–3	2–1	1–1	1–0		0–0	2–3	0–1
União de Leiria	2–1	0–3	0–3	3–1	1–3	2–1	1–0	0–2	0–0	0–1	0–2	1–0	1–2		0–1	1–0
Vitória de Guimarães	0–2	1–0	2–1	2–1	2–0	0–0	1–2	1–0	1–1	2–0	1–1	0–0	1–1	1–0		1–1
Vitória de Setúbal	0–1	0–0	0–2	0–0	2–4	2–1	1–1	0–0	1–0	3–1	0–4	3–3	0–3	4–1	2–1	

Source: LPFP (in Portuguese)
Legend: Blue = home team win; Yellow = draw; Red = away team win.

== Season statistics ==
=== Top goalscorers ===
Position	Player	Club	Goals
1	(Brazil) Hulk	Porto	23
2	(Colombia) Radamel Falcao	Porto	16
2	(Portugal) João Tomás	Rio Ave	16
4	(Paraguay) Óscar Cardozo	Benfica	12
5	(Senegal) Baba Diawara	Marítimo	11
6	(Brazil) Edgar	V. Guimarães	10
6	(Portugal) Silvestre Varela	Porto	10
8	(Brazil) Carlão	Leiria	9
8	(Brazil) Pitbull	V. Setúbal	9
8	(Venezuela) Mario Rondón	Paços de Ferreira	9
8	(Argentina) Javier Saviola	Benfica	9
8	(Brazil) Leandro Tatu	Beira-Mar	9

Updated as of games played on 14 May 2011.
Source: LPFP (in Portuguese)

== Awards ==
=== Monthly awards ===
==== SJPF Player of the Month ====
Month	Player	Club
September	(Brazil) Hulk	Porto
October	(Brazil) Hulk	Porto
November	(Portugal) João Tomás	Rio Ave
December	(Brazil) Hulk	Porto
January	(Brazil) Hulk	Porto
February	(Brazil) Diego	Vitória de Setúbal
March	(Brazil) Diego	Vitória de Setúbal
April	(Portugal) Rui Patrício	Sporting CP

==== SJPF Young Player of the Month ====
Month	Player	Club
September	(Portugal) Fábio Coentrão	Benfica
October	(Portugal) Daniel Candeias	Portimonense
November	(Portugal) Rui Patrício	Sporting CP
December	(Portugal) André Santos	Sporting CP
January	(Portugal) Pizzi	Paços de Ferreira
February	(Portugal) Rui Sampaio	Beira-Mar
March	(Portugal) Rui Patrício	Sporting CP
April	(Portugal) Rui Patrício	Sporting CP

==== SJPF Fair Play Award ====
Month	Club
September	Nacional
October	Sporting CP
November	Olhanense
December	
January	
February	Vitória de Guimarães
March	União de Leiria
April	Naval 1º de Maio

== Attendances ==
#	Club	Average	Highest
1	Benfica	38,146	54,991
2	Porto	36,987	49,817
3	Sporting	24,858	36,422
4	Braga	14,509	25,533
5	Vitória SC	13,919	25,651
6	Académica	4,558	13,264
7	Beira-Mar	4,020	15,468
8	Vitória FC	3,921	8,605
9	Marítimo	3,439	4,242
10	Portimonense	3,307	12,373
11	Olhanense	3,194	5,713
12	União de Leiria	2,407	12,506
13	Rio Ave	2,391	5,639
14	CD Nacional	2,083	4,568
15	Paços de Ferreira	1,930	4,845
16	Naval	1,604	5,201
