= Toni Conceição =

Portuguese footballer and manager (born 1961)

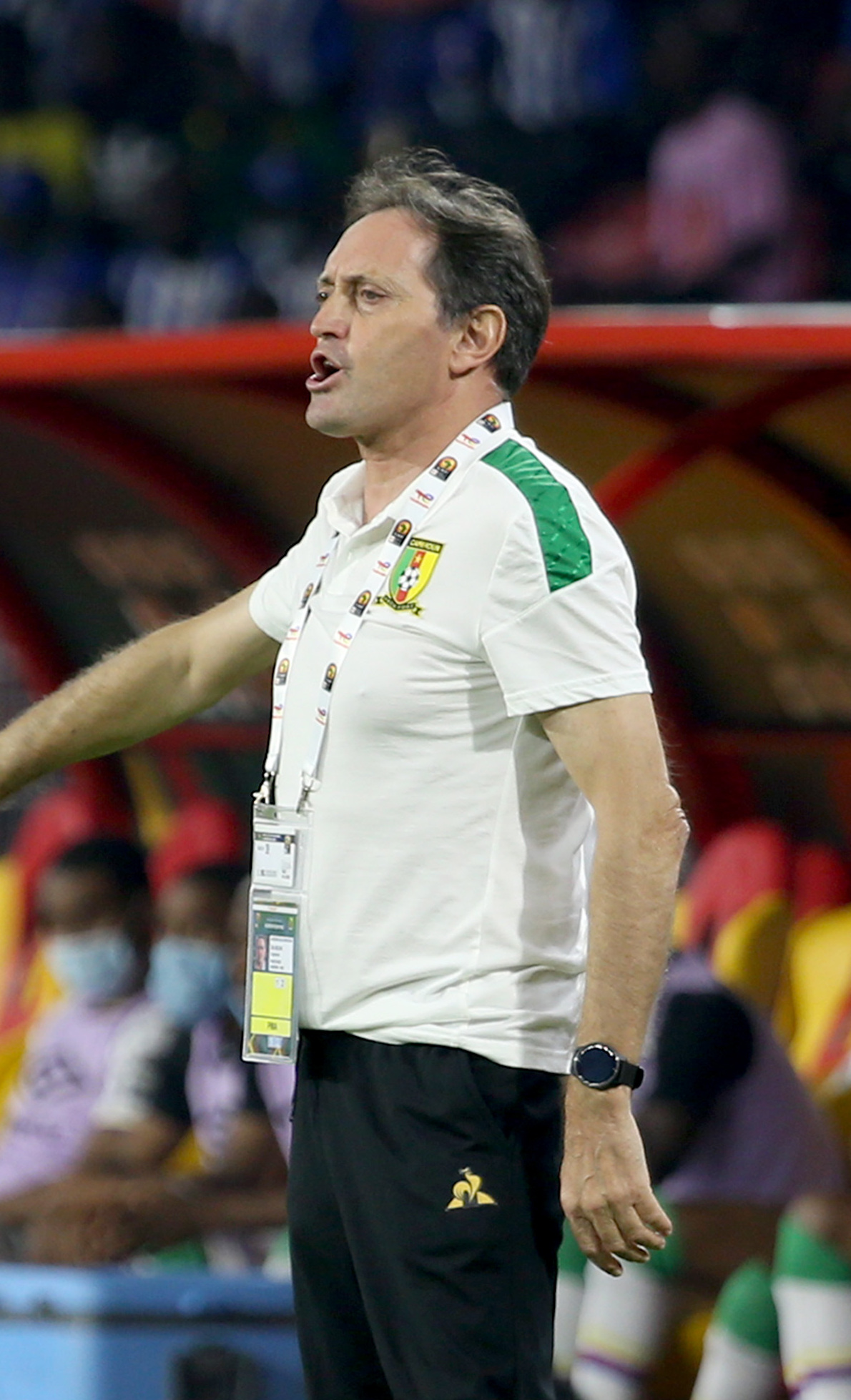
- Conceição in 2022

Personal information
- Full name: António Conceição da Silva Oliveira
- Date of birth: 6 December 1961 (age 64)
- Place of birth: Maximinos, Portugal
- Position: Right-back

Youth career
- 1975–1980: Braga

Senior career*
Years	Team	Apps	(Gls)
1980–1981	Braga	2	(0)
1981–1982	Vizela	24	(1)
1982–1983	Riopele	28	(1)
1983–1985	Vizela	60	(0)
1985–1989	Braga	101	(0)
1989–1991	Porto	1	(0)
Total		216	(2)

International career
1988	Portugal	1	(0)

Managerial career
- 1999–2002: Braga B
- 2003: Braga (interim)
- 2003–2004: Naval
- 2004–2006: Estrela Amadora
- 2006: Vitória Setúbal
- 2007–2008: Trofense
- 2009: CFR Cluj
- 2009–2010: Belenenses
- 2010–2011: Brașov
- 2012: Astra Ploiești
- 2012–2013: Braga B
- 2014: Moreirense
- 2014: Olhanense
- 2015: Al Faisaly
- 2015–2016: CFR Cluj
- 2017: Nea Salamina
- 2017: Penafiel
- 2018–2019: CFR Cluj
- 2019–2022: Cameroon
Medal record
Men's football
Representing Cameroon (as manager)
Africa Cup of Nations
Bronze medal – third place	2021
- * Club domestic league appearances and goals

António Conceição da Silva Oliveira (born 6 December 1961), known as Toni Conceição, is a Portuguese football manager and former player who played as a right-back.

His playing career was spent mostly in the Primeira Liga at Braga, as well as Vizela and one appearance for Porto. He earned a sole cap for Portugal in 1988.

In a managerial career of over two decades, Conceição led a variety of Portuguese teams and won league and cup honours in three spells with Cluj in Romania. He also managed Cameroon to third place at the 2021 Africa Cup of Nations.

== Playing career ==
Born in Maximinos, Braga District, Conceição played one full decade as a professional, making his debut in the Primeira Liga with local Braga. In 1984, he helped Vizela reach the top division for the first time in the club's history.

Subsequently, Conceição returned to Braga. He appeared in a career-best 36 games in the 1987–88 season, helping his team to the 11th position whilst acting as the captain.

Conceição signed for Porto in the summer of 1989. After only one competitive appearance in two years due to three serious injuries, he retired at the age of 29, returning later that decade in futsal. He earned one cap for Portugal, featuring the full 90 minutes in a 0–0 friendly against Sweden in Gothenburg, on 12 October 1988.

== Coaching career ==
Conceição started his managerial career at Braga B, spending three full seasons in the third division. He acted as interim to the first team during one match late into 2002–03, a 2–2 away draw against Beira Mar.

In the following years, Conceição worked with Naval 1º de Maio, Estrela da Amadora, Vitória de Setúbal and Trofense, with all sides but the third competing in the Segunda Liga and all attaining promotion. He moved abroad in January 2009, being appointed at Liga I's CFR Cluj and winning the Cupa României. He was dismissed by the latter as they led the table after 15 rounds.

After three months at the helm of Belenenses after signing in December 2009, winning only three games in 16 and suffering top-flight relegation, Conceição returned to Romania, where he coached Brașov and Astra Ploiești.

Conceição returned to his country in October 2012, being appointed at Braga B who were having their first experience in the second tier. He then led Moreirense to the division two championship, leaving at the end of the campaign.

Conceição was subsequently appointed at Olhanense of the same division. Though expected to win promotion, he was sacked in October 2014 with the side in the bottom half of the table following a 7–0 loss at Porto B. After a spell at Al Faisaly of the Saudi Professional League, he returned to Cluj in December 2015. The following 17 May his team – featuring compatriots Tiago Lopes, Camora and Vítor Bruno – won the cup again with a penalty shootout victory over Dinamo București.

In March 2017, Conceição was hired by Nea Salamis Famagusta, second in the Cypriot First Division. Three months later, he came home to take the reins at Penafiel of the second tier, leaving on 25 September by mutual consent after two wins from seven league games and elimination from both cups.

On 26 July 2018, Conceição began his third spell at Cluj. He was sacked the following 19 February after a run of three games without a win, though the team still led the championship by as many points; he earned the most points of the club's four managers in the league-winning season.

On 21 September 2019, Toni succeeded Clarence Seedorf as the head coach of the Cameroonian national team. On his debut on 12 October, the team achieved a goalless friendly draw away to Tunisia. The Indomitable Lions took part in 2021 Africa Cup of Nations qualification despite having a spot in the final tournament assured as hosts; they topped their qualification group. After losing on penalties to Egypt in the semi-finals and then defeating Burkina Faso on the same tiebreaker, the team finished third.

Conceição was dismissed on 28 February 2022.

== Honours ==
=== Player ===
Porto

- Primeira Liga: 1989–90

=== Manager ===
Trofense

- Segunda Liga: 2007–08

CFR Cluj

- Liga I: 2009–10, 2018–19
- Cupa României: 2008–09, 2009–10, 2015–16
- Supercupa României: 2009

Moreirense

- Segunda Liga: 2013–14

Cameroon

- Africa Cup of Nations third place: 2021
