= Nuno Silva (footballer, born 1975) =

Portuguese footballer

Personal information
- Full name: Nuno Miguel Costa Silva
- Date of birth: 27 October 1975 (age 51)
- Place of birth: Lisbon, Portugal
- Height: 1.80 m (5 ft 11 in)
- Position: Centre back

Youth career
- 1990–1992: Moradores 18 Maio
- 1992–1995: Ramilux

Senior career*
| Years | Team | Apps | (Gls) |
| 1995–1997 | Santa Clara | 29 | (0) |
| 1997–1999 | O Elvas | 58 | (6) |
| 1999–2014 | Leixões | 369 | (6) |
| 2004–2005 | → Penafiel (loan) | 15 | (1) |
| Total | | 471 | (13) |
- * Club domestic league appearances and goals

Nuno Miguel Costa Silva (born 27 October 1975) is a Portuguese retired footballer who played as a central defender.

== Club career ==
Born in Lisbon, Silva spent the vast majority of his 19-year professional career with Leixões Sport Clube, competing with the team in all three major levels of Portuguese football. He started playing with C.D. Santa Clara in 1995, in the fourth division.

In the 2006–07 season, Silva appeared in 20 matches – all starts – as the Matosinhos side returned to the Primeira Liga after a lengthy absence, as champions. In 2008–09 he contributed with 22 games for a sixth position in the league, narrowly missing out on qualification to the UEFA Europa League.

Silva retired at the end of the 2013–14 campaign, aged 38 and after four consecutive years in division two with his main club. He spent 2004–05 on loan to F.C. Penafiel, where he scored his first and only goal in the top flight, away against Gil Vicente F.C. for the game's only on 16 January 2005.

== Honours ==
Leixões

- Segunda Liga: 2006–07
- Portuguese Second Division: 2002–03
