= Jan Lechaba =

South African soccer player (born 1960)

Personal information
- Full name: Jan Matsobane Lechaba
- Date of birth: 27 July 1960 (age 66)
- Place of birth: ZEBEDIELA, South Africa
- Position: Midfielder

Senior career*
Years	Team	Apps	(Gls)
1973–1977	Pretoria Callies	120	(24)
1977–1978	Beira-Mar		
1979–1980	Beira-Mar	17	(1)
1980–1986	Kaizer Chiefs	180	(54)
1986	Mamelodi Sundowns	20	(5)
Total		336	(84)

International career
1977	South Africa		
- * Club domestic league appearances and goals

Jan Matsobane "Malombo" Lechaba (born 27 July 1960) is a South African former soccer player who played as a midfielder. Lechaba represented South Africa in 1977 versus Rhodesia.
