= Fabeta =

Portuguese footballer

Personal information
- Full name: Fábio Daniel Moreira Barros
- Date of birth: 1 April 1987 (age 39)
- Place of birth: Gens, Portugal
- Height: 1.89 m (6 ft 2 in)
- Position: Centre-back

Youth career
- 1995–2006: Gondomar

Senior career*
Years	Team	Apps	(Gls)
2006–2008	Gondomar	25	(2)
2008–2009	Asteras Tripolis	1	(0)
2009–2010	Beira-Mar	4	(0)
2010–2011	Santa Clara	5	(0)
2011–2012	Gondomar	30	(0)
2012–2013	Ayia Napa	7	(0)
2013	Fátima	9	(0)
2014	União Leiria	12	(0)
2014–2015	Cinfães	21	(1)
2015–2016	Sanjoanense	26	(3)
2016–2018	Anadia	53	(3)
2018	Cesarense	9	(0)
2019	Lusitânia	13	(1)
Total		215	(10)
- * Club domestic league appearances and goals

Fábio Daniel Moreira Barros (born 1 April 1987 in Gens, Gondomar, Porto District), known as Fabeta, is a Portuguese former professional footballer who played as a central defender.
