= Jorge Casquilha =

Portuguese footballer and manager

Personal information
- Full name: Jorge António Rosa Casquilha
- Date of birth: 13 January 1969 (age 57)
- Place of birth: Torres Novas, Portugal
- Height: 1.83 m (6 ft 0 in)
- Position: Midfielder

Team information
- Current team: İmişli (manager)

Youth career
- 1982–1987: Torres Novas

Senior career*
Years	Team	Apps	(Gls)
1987–1988	Torres Novas		
1988–1990	Mirense	26	(8)
1990–1991	Académica	22	(4)
1991–1992	Mirense	30	(10)
1992–1993	Amora	15	(0)
1993–1997	Feirense	122	(29)
1997–2005	Gil Vicente	220	(17)
2005–2006	Espinho	23	(1)
Total		458	(69)

Managerial career
- 2006–2007: Santa Maria
- 2007–2008: Valdevez
- 2008–2009: Merelinense
- 2009–2013: Moreirense
- 2014: Leixões
- 2014–2016: União Leiria
- 2016: Académico Viseu
- 2017: União Madeira
- 2017: Gil Vicente
- 2019: Leixões
- 2019: Cova Piedade
- 2022–2023: Trofense
- 2024–2025: Znojmo
- 2025–: İmişli
- * Club domestic league appearances and goals

Jorge António Rosa Casquilha (born 13 January 1969) is a Portuguese former professional footballer who played as an attacking midfielder. He is the manager of Azerbaijan Premier League club İmişli.

After playing in the Primeira Liga for Gil Vicente for six years, he embarked on a managerial career in 2006, leading seven clubs in the second tier and briefly Moreirense in the top flight after two promotions.

== Playing career ==
Born in Torres Novas, Santarém District, Casquilha played 19 years as a senior. He started out at his local club, then alternated between the second and third divisions in the following seasons.

Casquilha made his debut in the Primeira Liga in the 1999–2000 campaign, aged already 30. Alongside future Benfica and Portugal star Petit, he was an essential midfield unit for Gil Vicente who finished in a best-ever fifth position, scoring three goals in 32 games.

After helping the Barcelos side always retain its league status, and having amassed Portuguese top-flight totals of 177 matches and 11 goals, the 36-year-old Casquilha left and signed for Espinho in the third tier, following which he retired.

== Coaching career ==
Casquilha began coaching in 2006, immediately after retiring. He started with amateurs Santa Maria, which he guided to the second place in the AF Braga regional championships. In quick succession, he then worked with Merelinense and Valdevez, guiding the latter to the last 16 in the Taça de Portugal in 2007–08.

In summer 2009, Casquilha was appointed at Moreirense. He achieved promotions in 2010 and 2012, the latter signifying a return to the top division after an absence of seven years.

On 30 January 2013, after only one win in the first 16 league games of the season, Casquilha was relieved of his duties. Highlights included, however, a 3–2 home win over Sporting CP in the domestic cup after extra time.

On 6 March 2014, Casquilha signed a deal with second division side Leixões until the end of the campaign. On 30 April, however, he was suspended due to comments he made in an interview which were regarded as inappropriate and detrimental to the club's name and history.

Casquilha returned to management in December 2014, taking over at União de Leiria in the third tier. He was dismissed in March 2016, after failing with the board's aim to win promotion.

Still in March 2016, Casquilha returned to division two with Académico de Viseu as their third manager of the campaign. In January 2017, he was hired at União da Madeira in the same league.

Casquilha moved to his former club Gil Vicente on 26 May 2017. He left on 28 December, as they were placed 15th in the standings.

Halfway through 2018–19, Casquilha rejoined Leixões after the dismissal of Filipe Gouveia. After taking the team to seventh place, he left at the end of his contract for Cova da Piedade in the same league. He quit on 15 December, with the side last-placed with seven points.

Casquilha was appointed at second-division Trofense in November 2022. He left on 20 March with the team in last place, being succeeded by his former Gil goalkeeper Rui Sacramento as the fourth manager of the season.

On 27 September 2024, Casquilha became head coach of Moravian-Silesian Football League club Znojmo.

== Managerial statistics ==
As of match played 18 March 2023

Managerial record by club and tenure
Team	From	To	Record				
Team	From	To	M	W	D	L	Win %
Santa Maria	1 July 2006	30 June 2007	30	19	7	4	63.33
Valdevez	1 July 2007	17 March 2008	30	15	9	6	50.00
Merelinense	14 October 2008	30 June 2009	30	18	6	6	60.00
Moreirense	1 July 2009	29 January 2013	136	61	38	37	44.85
Leixões	6 March 2014	30 June 2014	8	3	1	4	37.50
União Leiria	2 December 2014	1 March 2016	42	23	14	5	54.76
Académico Viseu	15 March 2016	30 June 2016	11	4	3	4	36.36
União Madeira	10 January 2017	26 May 2017	21	11	6	4	52.38
Gil Vicente	26 May 2017	28 December 2017	21	6	6	9	28.57
Leixões	31 December 2018	22 May 2019	21	8	6	7	38.10
Cova Piedade	22 May 2019	15 December 2019	16	3	2	11	18.75
Trofense	24 November 2022	20 March 2023	15	3	4	8	20.00
Total			381	174	102	105	45.67
