= Siaka Bamba =

Ivorian footballer (born 1989)

Personal information
- Date of birth: 24 August 1989 (age 37)
- Place of birth: Abidjan, Ivory Coast
- Height: 1.75 m (5 ft 9 in)
- Position: Defensive midfielder

Team information
- Current team: União de Tomar
- Number: 6

Youth career
- –2007: Oryx
- 2007–2008: Chaves

Senior career*
Years	Team	Apps	(Gls)
2008–2010	Chaves	71	(5)
2010–2011	Feirense	28	(3)
2011–2013	Vitória Guimarães	8	(0)
2011–2012	→ Feirense (loan)	17	(2)
2012–2013	Vitória Guimarães B	24	(2)
2013–2014	Chaves	30	(2)
2014–2015	Nea Salamis	14	(0)
2015–2016	Chaves	38	(6)
2016–2017	Cova da Piedade	32	(1)
2017	Sintrense	13	(2)
2018	Fátima	20	(3)
2018–2019	Rec do Libolo		
2019	Valadares Gaia	2	(0)
2020	Fátima	7	(0)
2020–	União de Tomar	85	(13)

International career
2005	Ivory Coast U17		
- * Club domestic league appearances and goals as of 17:53, 16 June 2024 (UTC)

Siaka Bamba (born 24 August 1989) is an Ivorian professional footballer who plays as a defensive midfielder for União de Tomar.

== Career ==
In summer 2013, Bamba rejoined former side Desportivo de Chaves.

Whilst at Feirense, Bamba won the SJPF Segunda Liga Player of the Month for March 2011.

Bamba represented his country at the 2005 FIFA U-17 World Championship. During the tournament which saw his side finish bottom of their group, Bamba scored a goal for his country in a 1–1 draw with the United States.

In 2018–19, he signed in for Recreativo do Libolo in Angola's premier league, the Girabola.

== Honours ==
Desportivo de Chaves

- Taça de Portugal: Runners-up 2009–10

Vitória de Guimarães

- Taça de Portugal: 2012–13

Individual

- SJPF Segunda Liga Player of the Month: March 2011
