= Marco Paulo (footballer, born 1973) =

Portuguese football manager and former player

Personal information
- Full name: Marco Paulo Faria de Lemos
- Date of birth: 28 May 1973 (age 53)
- Place of birth: Sintra, Portugal
- Height: 1.80 m (5 ft 11 in)
- Position: Midfielder

Youth career
- 1984–1985: Benfica
- 1985–1987: Dramático Cascais
- 1987–1988: Sintrense
- 1988–1991: Estoril

Senior career*
Years	Team	Apps	(Gls)
1991–1999	Estoril	186	(10)
1991–1992	→ O Elvas (loan)	31	(4)
1999–2001	Paços Ferreira	64	(2)
2001–2005	Belenenses	110	(5)
2005–2006	Estoril	33	(0)
2006–2009	Estrela Amadora	48	(1)
2009–2010	Mafra	21	(0)
Total		493	(22)

International career
1993–1994	Portugal U21	10	(0)

Managerial career
- 2005–2006: Estoril (interim)
- 2012: Belenenses
- 2013: Belenenses (youth)
- 2013–2014: Belenenses
- 2018: 1º Dezembro
- * Club domestic league appearances and goals

Marco Paulo Faria de Lemos (born 28 May 1973), known as Marco Paulo, is a Portuguese retired footballer who played as a central midfielder. He was also a manager.

== Playing career ==
Born in Sintra, Lisbon metropolitan area, Marco Paulo spent seven of his first eight years as a senior with local G.D. Estoril Praia, playing his first two seasons in the Primeira Liga and a further five in the Segunda Liga. After two years with F.C. Paços de Ferreira, one in each major level, he returned to the capital and joined C.F. Os Belenenses.

Marco Paulo was regularly used in his four-season spell at the Estádio do Restelo, inclusively serving as team captain. Aged 32, he returned to the second division and Estoril, acting as interim player-coach for five games and achieving only one draw, after which he returned to the top flight with C.F. Estrela da Amadora.

After 21 league appearances in his debut campaign, veteran Marco Paulo was sparingly used the following two, with Estrela also being relegated in 2009 due to financial irregularities. He closed out his career at 37 after one year with another club in the Lisbon area, C.D. Mafra, amassing top-tier totals of 244 matches and nine goals.

== Coaching career ==
Marco Paulo was appointed director of football at his former side Belenenses in early April 2010. On 17 February 2012, with the side ranking 11th in division two, he replaced José Mota as head coach, eventually leading them to fifth position.

With the club again in the top flight, Marco Paulo replaced Mitchell van der Gaag after the latter stepped down early in the season due to health problems. He was relieved of his duties in March 2014, due to poor results.
