= José Guilherme (football manager) =

Portuguese football coach (born 1965)

Personal information
- Full name: José Guilherme Granja Oliveira
- Date of birth: 5 September 1965 (age 61)
- Place of birth: Arcozelo (Vila Nova de Gaia), Portugal

Managerial career
- Years: Team
- 1997: Esmoriz
- 2003–2008: Porto youth
- 2011: Académica
- 2011–2012: Padroense U17
- 2012–2014: Porto U17
- 2014: Porto B
- 2015–2016: Portugal U16
- 2016–2017: Portugal U17
- 2017–2018: Portugal U20
- 2018–2019: Portugal U16
- 2019–2020: Portugal U17
- 2020–2021: Portugal U18

José Guilherme Granja Oliveira (born 5 September 1965), known as José Guilherme, is a Portuguese football coach. He spent most of his career with Portugal's youth international teams, and also had brief spells in charge of Académica Coimbra in the Primeira Liga and Porto B in the second tier.

== Career ==
José Guilherme began his coaching career at S.C. Esmoriz before joining the youth teams of FC Porto, where he was a national champion four times. He was also part of the senior national team coaching staff led by Carlos Queiroz (2008–2010).

On 26 December 2010, José Guilherme was appointed as manager of Primeira Liga club Académica de Coimbra on a deal until the end of the season, with the option of one more year. He succeeded Jorge Costa, and was assisted by José Costa, a former Académica player and manager. He resigned the following 20 February, having drawn two and lost four of his league games; in the Taça de Portugal, he took them through two rounds into the semi-finals.

José Guilherme returned to Porto as under-17 manager. On 6 March 2014, with his team leading their league, he was promoted to manager of the B-team in first place in the second tier, as Luís Castro moved to the first team.

José Guilherme was manager of the Portugal under-17 team that were defending champions of Europe, but missed out on qualification for the 2017 UEFA European Championship after a 2–0 loss to Spain. In November 2019, he led them to the Elite Round of qualification, before it and the finals in Estonia were cancelled due to the COVID-19 pandemic.

In 2021, José Guilherme was appointed assistant technical director of the Portuguese Football Federation.
