= Lázaro Oliveira =

Angolan footballer and manager

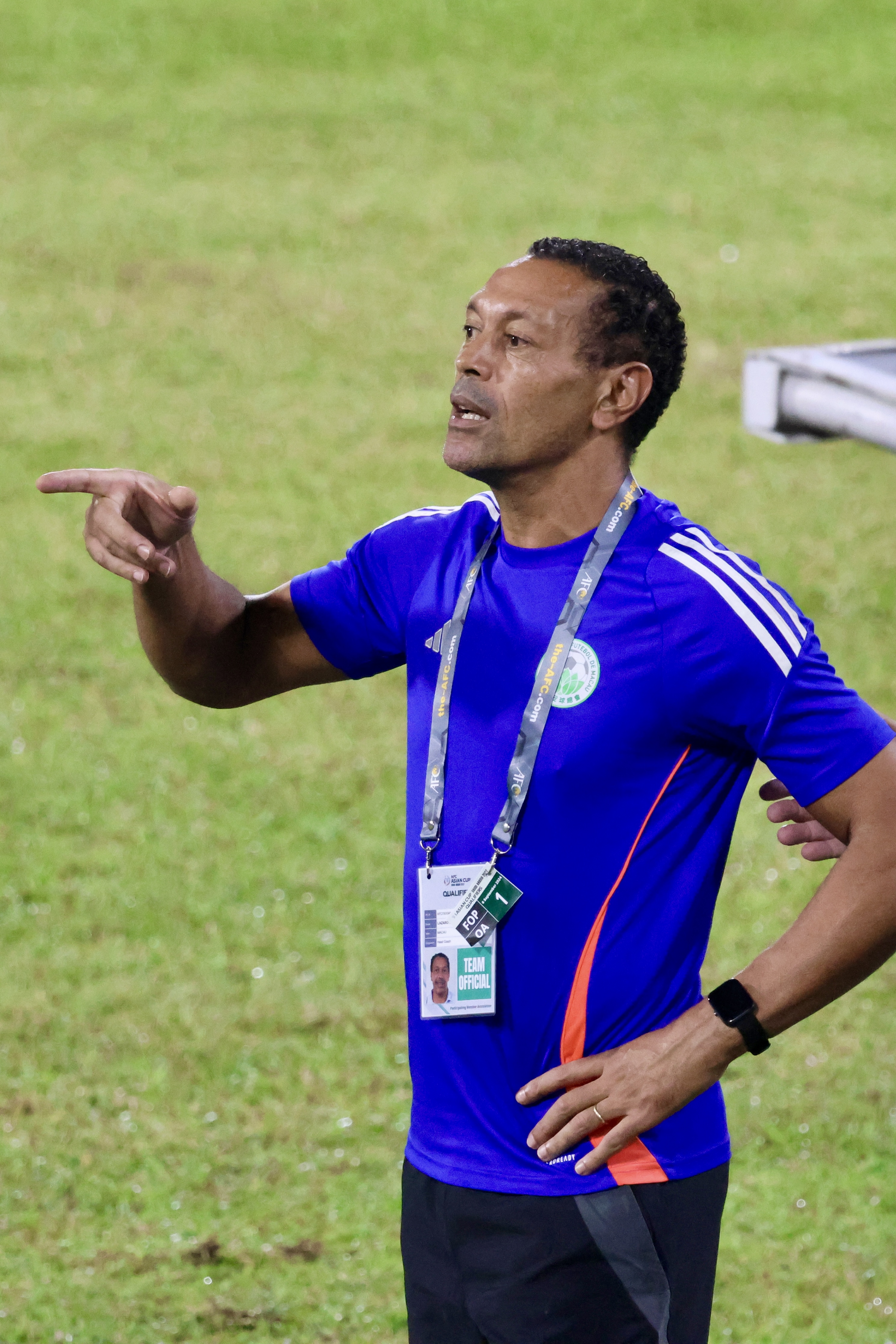
- Lázaro coaching the Macau in 2024

Personal information
- Full name: Lázaro Fonseca Costa Oliveira
- Date of birth: 27 August 1967 (age 59)
- Place of birth: Angola
- Height: 1.82 m (5 ft 11 1/2 in)
- Position: Midfielder

Youth career
- 1981–1987: Oeiras

Senior career*
| Years | Team | Apps | (Gls) |
| 1987–1988 | Os Marialvas | 33 | (4) |
| 1988–1989 | Usseira | | |
| 1989–1994 | Estoril | 96 | (8) |
| 1994–1995 | Louletano | 31 | (9) |
| 1995–1997 | Penafiel | 64 | (10) |
| 1997–2003 | Estrela Amadora | 166 | (8) |
| Total | | 390 | (39) |

International career
| 1998–1999 | Angola | 6 | (1) |

Managerial career
- 2003–2008: Estrela Amadora (assistant)
- 2008–2009: Estrela Amadora
- 2009–2010: Penafiel
- 2012–2014: Portimonense
- 2015: Atlético
- 2016–2017: Farense
- 2020–2023: Macau U23
- 2020–2024: Macau
- * Club domestic league appearances and goals

Lázaro Fonseca Costa Oliveira (born 27 August 1967), known simply as Lázaro in his playing days, is an Angolan retired footballer who played as a central midfielder, and the previous head coach for the Macau national football team.

== Playing career ==
Lázaro spent his entire career in Portugal. He started professionally at G.D. Estoril Praia in the second division, scoring a combined eight goals in his first two seasons, the latter finishing in promotion to the Primeira Liga.

In the top level, however, Lázaro was only a backup player during three years, his best input being 17 matches in the 1991–92 campaign – 11 starts – as the Lisbon team finished in tenth position. He subsequently competed in divisions three and two, with Louletano D.C. and F.C. Penafiel respectively.

Aged 30, Lázaro returned to the top flight with C.F. Estrela da Amadora, also in the Portuguese capital. He would be regularly played during five of his seven years with the club, retiring in December 2003 with competition totals of 148 games and seven goals (plus 211 appearances and 23 goals in the second tier).

== International goals ==
Scores and results list Angola's goal tally first.

| No | Date | Venue | Opponent | Score | Result | Competition |
|---|---|---|---|---|---|---|
| 1. | 12 February 1998 | Omnisports, Bobo-Dioulasso, Burkina Faso | Namibia | 1–1 | 3–3 | 1998 Africa Cup of Nations |

== Managerial career ==
=== Estrela Amadora ===
Lázaro took up coaching immediately after retiring, spending four years as an assistant at Estrela always in the top tier. Early into the 2008–09 season he replaced countryman Lito Vidigal as head coach at Estrela Amadora, leading the team into safety only to suffer relegation due to financial irregularities.

=== Portimonense ===
In summer 2009, Lázaro joined another former club, Penafiel in the second division. He was sacked midway through his second year, joining another side in that level, Portimonense, on 18 January 2012. He was dismissed on 21 April with the team in seventh place with two games remaining of the campaign, after a run of poor results made qualifying for the play-offs difficult.

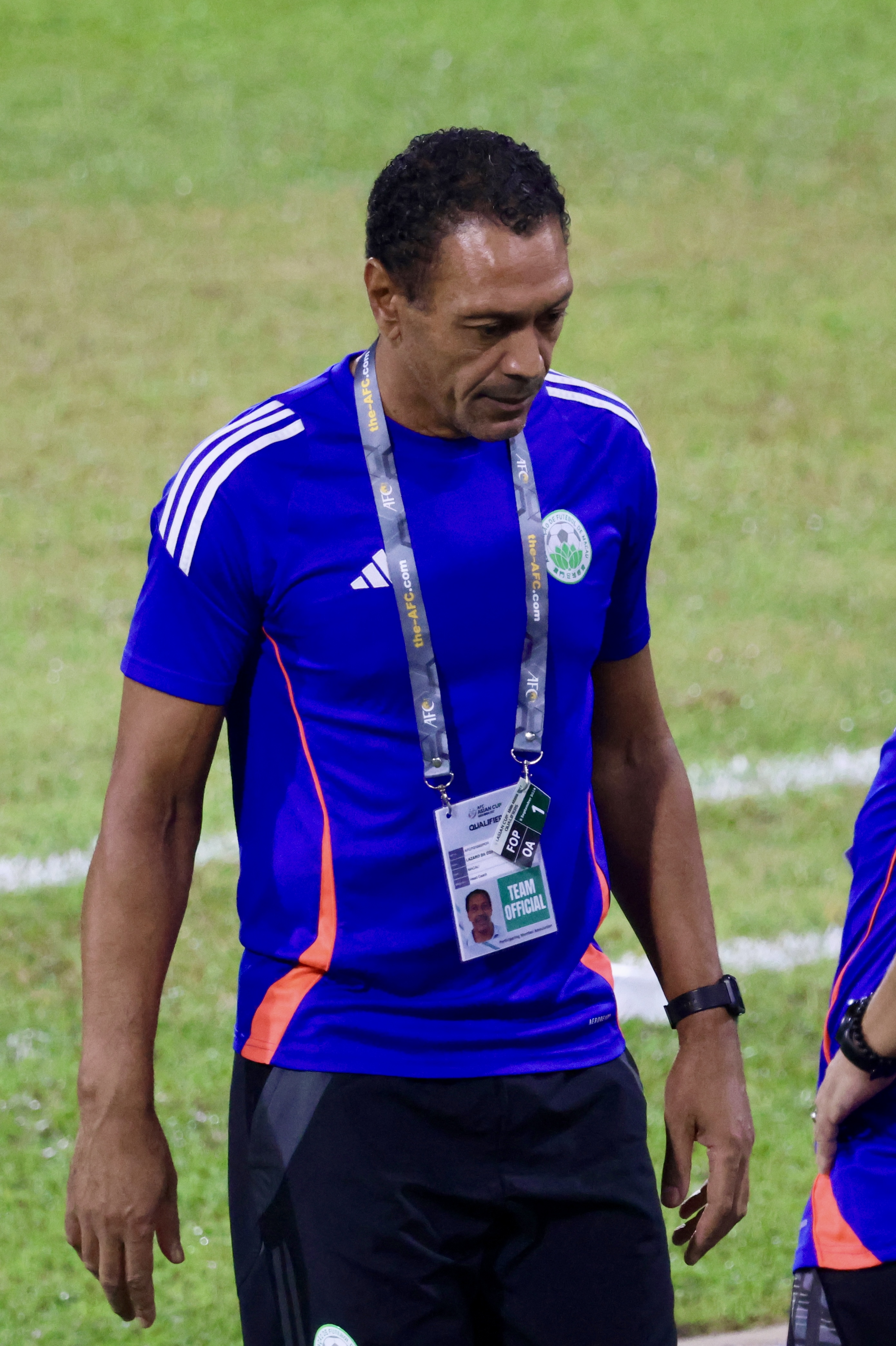
Lázaro coaching Macau in 2024.

=== Atlético ===
Lázaro became manager of Atlético, struggling in the second level, on 9 January 2015. He quit the Lisbon-based side on 28 March, with them second from last.

=== Farense ===
On 22 July 2016, Lázaro returned to the Algarve, taking over at Farense of the third tier. He was sacked the following 3 April, after a 2–2 draw with neighbours Louletano left the team in fifth, six points away from leaders C.D. Fátima.

=== Macau national team ===
On 23 January 2020, Lázaro was appointed as Macau national team head coach and also their under-23 side.
