= João Eusébio =

Portuguese football manager (born 1962)

Personal information
- Full name: João Eusébio Ferreira da Costa
- Date of birth: 6 March 1962 (age 64)
- Place of birth: Vila do Conde, Portugal
- Position: Midfielder

Youth career
- Rio Ave

Senior career*
Years	Team	Apps	(Gls)
1981–1983	Rio Ave	3	(0)
1983–1989	Bragança		
1987–1988	→ Vinhais (loan)		
1989–1994	Rio Ave	76	(3)
1994–1995	Lusitânia		
1995–1996	Ribeirão		

Managerial career
- 1999–2001: Bragança
- 2001–2002: Esposende
- 2002–2004: Bragança
- 2004–2005: Rio Ave (youth)
- 2006–2009: Rio Ave
- 2009: Gil Vicente
- 2009: Covilhã
- 2011: Chaves
- 2011–2012: Trofense
- 2012–2013: Freamunde
- 2013: Chaves
- 2014: Chibuto
- 2015–2016: Varzim (youth)
- 2016–2017: Varzim
- 2020–2021: Leixões (caretaker)
- * Club domestic league appearances and goals

João Eusébio Ferreira da Costa (born 6 March 1962), known as João Eusébio, is a Portuguese former football player and manager.

As manager of Rio Ave from 2006 to 2009, he managed in two Primeira Liga seasons, with a promotion from the second tier in between. He spent most of his career at the second level, with seven clubs, and had a brief spell with Chibuto of Mozambique's Moçambola in 2014.

== Career ==
=== Playing and early managerial career ===
Born in Vila do Conde, midfielder João Eusébio began his career at hometown club Rio Ave F.C. where he made three Primeira Liga appearances in the early 1980s, returning to the club in the lower leagues a decade later. After managing in the lower leagues with GD Bragança and A.D. Esposende, João Eusébio returned to Rio Ave as academy manager.

=== Rio Ave ===
In March 2006, António Sousa was sacked by Rio Ave after a 5–0 loss to S.C. Braga and João Eusébio was appointed in his place; his debut as a top-flight manager on 6 March was a 2–1 home win over C.F. Os Belenenses. His team ended the season with relegation, and he put himself forward to manage them in the second tier.

In 2007–08, Rio Ave won promotion back to the top level as runners-up to C.D. Trofense. On 24 August, in the first game of the new season, his team held S.L. Benfica to a 1–1 draw at the Estádio do Rio Ave FC; he said that he had exploited a known vulnerability in the Lisbon side's pressing game. Having won twice and drawn four times in 13 games, with the club second from bottom, he was sacked on 5 January 2009 and replaced by the returning Carlos Brito.

=== Second-tier regular ===
On 17 February 2009, João Eusébio was hired at Gil Vicente F.C. in place of Manuel Ribeiro. At the end of the season, he moved to S.C. Covilhã during their 86th anniversary in June, but left on 1 September after one win and two losses in the second tier, and disputes with club president José Mendes.

After two years out of work, João Eusébio began 2011–12 in charge of G.D. Chaves before moving to Trofense in December, again replacing Sousa. His contract to the end of the season was not renewed after taking the club to 8th place.

On 3 October 2012, João Eusébio was hired at S.C. Freamunde, last-placed in the second tier. Starting in the ninth round of fixtures, he led the team for 21 games, winning 4 and losing 12; he left by common agreement the following 25 February with the league position unaltered.

João Eusébio agreed to a return to Chaves in 2013–14. He left on 15 October after a four-game winless run, having taken 13 points from 10 games.

=== Mozambique and return ===
In January 2014, 51-year-old João Eusébio moved abroad for the first time in his career, to FC Chibuto of the Moçambola in Mozambique. Having not won either of his two games, he was sacked in April.

João Eusébio returned to Portugal and became academy manager at Varzim S.C. based in Póvoa de Varzim near his hometown. In early October 2016, first-team manager Armando Evangelista was sacked and João Eusébio replaced him on an interim basis for two weeks until the league mandated for the club to name a permanent manager. He lasted 12 months until his own dismissal, after fans showed their disapproval.

In June 2019, João Eusébio went back to Bragança after 15 years away, being named general manager. A year later, he was hired as a coordinator at Leixões S.C.. On 5 October 2020, he was named interim manager after the five-game spell of Tiago Fernandes. He returned to his previous role three months later, as José Mota returned to the club, now in 16th place.
