= Pedro Miguel (footballer, born 1967) =

Portuguese football manager (born 1967)

Personal information
- Full name: Pedro Miguel Bastos Soares Ferreira
- Date of birth: 23 August 1967 (age 59)
- Place of birth: Oliveira de Azeméis, Portugal
- Height: 1.78 m (5 ft 10 in)
- Position: Defender

Youth career
- 1983–1985: Oliveirense
- 1985–1986: Porto

Senior career*
Years	Team	Apps	(Gls)
1986–1987	Oliveirense	3	(1)
1987–1993	Feirense	129	(5)
1993–1994	Oliveirense		
1994–1995	Beira-Mar	28	(1)
1995–2000	Farense	82	(2)
2001–2002	Oliveirense		
Total		242+	(9+)

Managerial career
- 2004–2012: Oliveirense
- 2013–2015: Feirense
- 2015–2016: Leixões
- 2016–2020: Oliveirense
- 2021–2022: Varzim
- 2024–2026: Lusitânia Lourosa
- * Club domestic league appearances and goals

Pedro Miguel Bastos Soares Ferreira (born 23 August 1967) is a Portuguese football manager and former player. He played as a defender in the Primeira Liga for Feirense, Beira-Mar and Farense.

He spent 12 years as manager of Oliveirense over two spells, winning promotion from the third tier in 2008 and 2017 – the first as champion – and reaching the semi-finals of the Taça da Liga in 2018. He won another promotion as third-tier champions with Lusitânia Lourosa in 2025. He managed Oliveirense, Feirense, Leixões, Varzim and Lusitânia Lourosa in the second tier.

== Playing career ==
Born in Oliveira de Azeméis in the Aveiro District, Pedro Miguel played in the Primeira Liga for C.D. Feirense, S.C. Beira-Mar and S.C. Farense, playing 138 games and scoring 4 goals. On 26 September 1995, with the last of those clubs, he played in a 1–0 loss away to Olympique Lyonnais in the first round of the UEFA Cup.

== Managerial career ==
=== Oliveirense ===
Pedro Miguel managed his hometown club U.D. Oliveirense from 2004 to 2012. On 22 June 2008, already promoted from the third tier, his team beat S.C. Covilhã 1–0 in the playoff final.

=== Feirense ===
On 19 June 2013, Pedro Miguel went back to Feirense as manager, with the club in the second tier. His contract with the club from Santa Maria da Feira was not renewed in July 2015, after finishing 14th and 7th in respective seasons.

=== Leixões ===
Pedro Miguel returned to work with Leixões S.C. in the same division on 25 November 2015.

=== Return to Oliveirense ===
In 2016, Pedro Miguel went back to Oliveirense for the following season, winning promotion from the third tier despite losing the final 2–0 to Real S.C. on 4 June 2017. In the Taça da Liga in 2017–18, his club won their group with a 4–1 victory away to the seeded Vitória de Guimarães, then lost the semi-final 2–0 to Vitória de Setúbal.

Pedro Miguel signed contract extensions in May 2018, June 2019, and June 2020. He was sacked on 10 November 2020, with the club in 13th after three consecutive defeats.

=== Varzim ===
On 6 December 2021, Pedro Miguel was hired at Varzim S.C. who were 17th in the second tier, succeeding António Barbosa. He suffered the first relegation of his career, despite his club taking the fourth-most points in the second half of the season.

=== Lusitânia Lourosa ===
After over two years out of work, Pedro Miguel was hired at Liga 3 club Lusitânia Lourosa on 3 September 2024. The following 23 May, having won promotion as champions, his contract was extended for another year. On 20 May 2026, it was announced that he would leave his role as manager of Lusitânia de Lourosa following the conclusion of the season.

== Honours ==
Oliveirense

- Segunda Divisão: 2007–08

Lusitânia Lourosa

- Liga 3: 2024–25
