= Vítor Oliveira (footballer, born 1953) =

Portuguese footballer and manager (1953–2020)

Personal information
- Full name: Vítor Manuel Oliveira
- Date of birth: 17 November 1953
- Place of birth: Matosinhos, Portugal
- Date of death: 28 November 2020 (aged 67)
- Place of death: Matosinhos, Portugal
- Position: Midfielder

Youth career
- 1969–1972: Leixões

Senior career*
Years	Team	Apps	(Gls)
1972–1975	Leixões	60	(5)
1975–1976	Paredes		
1976–1979	Famalicão		
1979–1981	Espinho	39	(1)
1981–1983	Braga	44	(1)
1983–1985	Portimonense	47	(4)

Managerial career
- 1979: Famalicão (player-coach)
- 1985–1987: Portimonense
- 1987–1988: Maia
- 1989–1992: Paços Ferreira
- 1992–1995: Gil Vicente
- 1995: Vitória Guimarães
- 1996–1997: Académica
- 1997–1998: União Leiria
- 1998: Braga
- 1998–2000: Belenenses
- 2000–2001: Rio Ave
- 2001–2003: Gil Vicente
- 2003: Académica
- 2004–2005: Moreirense
- 2006–2007: Leixões
- 2007–2008: União Leiria
- 2009–2010: Trofense
- 2010–2011: Aves
- 2011–2013: Arouca
- 2013–2014: Moreirense
- 2014–2015: União Madeira
- 2015–2016: Chaves
- 2016–2018: Portimonense
- 2018–2019: Paços Ferreira
- 2019–2020: Gil Vicente
- * Club domestic league appearances and goals

Vítor Manuel Oliveira (17 November 1953 – 28 November 2020) was a Portuguese football midfielder and manager.

In a managerial career spanning over 30 years, he won 11 promotions to the Primeira Liga, six as champion.

== Playing career ==
Born in Matosinhos, Oliveira's senior career spanned 13 seasons, ten of which were spent in the Primeira Liga where he appeared in a total of 218 games, scoring 17 goals; he represented Leixões SC, F.C. Famalicão, S.C. Espinho, S.C. Braga and Portimonense S.C. at that level. In his last year as a professional, he played 23 matches (one goal) for the latter team as they finished fifth and qualified for the UEFA Cup for the first and only time in their history.

Oliveira retired in June 1985, at the age of 31. In the Segunda Liga, he played for U.S.C. Paredes and Famalicão.

== Coaching career ==
Oliveira was player-manager of Famalicão for their final match of the 1978–79 season, after the exit of Mário Imbelloni. The team lost 2–0 at C.F. Os Belenenses on 17 June, and were consequently relegated from the top level.

Afterwards, Oliveira was in charge of Portimonense. His first season yielded the best finish of his entire career as seventh in the 1985–86, and he was dismissed midway through the following campaign. In the following years he worked almost exclusively with F.C. Paços de Ferreira in division two, achieving promotion in 1991 as champions and retaining league status the next year.

After three full seasons in the top flight with Gil Vicente FC, Oliveira coached several clubs in the first and second divisions, promoting from the latter tier with U.D. Leiria, Belenenses and Leixões. Early into 2007–08 he replaced fired Paulo Duarte at the helm of Leiria, but only managed to lead his team to three wins in his 21 games (14 losses) as the season ended in top-division relegation.

After working with former club Leixões as director of football in 2008–09, Oliveira resumed his career in the second level, with C.D. Trofense, C.D. Aves, F.C. Arouca and Moreirense FC. On 19 May 2016, he returned to Portimonense nearly three decades after his first spell, on a one-year contract with the aim of winning promotion. After doing so as champions – his fifth consecutive promotion – he decided to remain in the Algarve; having taken the team to tenth place on their return to the top flight, he left the Estádio Municipal de Portimão in May 2018.

On 22 May 2018, Oliveira replaced João Henriques as manager of another former side, Paços de Ferreira. In May 2019, having sealed his eleventh promotion and sixth as champion, he left for yet another former employer Gil Vicente – who had been restored to the top tier in a court decision. On 10 August, in their first game of the season, they beat FC Porto 2–1 at home; they finished in tenth, after which he left.

== Death and legacy ==
Oliveira died while going for a walk in his hometown of Matosinhos on 28 November 2020, at the age of 67; early reports, which were later confirmed, stated that he felt unwell and died of a heart attack. He had been working as a pundit for Canal 11 a few weeks prior to the event.

Afterwards, the Liga Portuguesa de Futebol Profissional decided to name the monthly and yearly Best Manager Award in his honour.

== Managerial statistics ==
As of match played 24 July 2020

Managerial record by team and tenure
Team	Nat	From	To	Record				
Team	Nat	From	To	G	W	D	L	Win %
Famalicão (caretaker)	(Portugal)	11 June 1979	18 June 1979	1	0	0	1	0.00
Portimonense	(Portugal)	8 June 1985	5 February 1987	58	23	11	24	39.66
Maia	(Portugal)	1 July 1987	31 December 1988	59	32	14	13	54.24
Paços Ferreira	(Portugal)	17 January 1989	20 March 1992	134	66	28	40	49.25
Gil Vicente	(Portugal)	20 May 1992	30 May 1995	105	29	31	45	27.62
Vitória Guimarães	(Portugal)	31 May 1995	18 December 1995	19	8	4	7	42.11
Académica	(Portugal)	11 January 1996	17 May 1997	56	27	11	18	48.21
União Leiria	(Portugal)	17 May 1997	18 May 1998	40	24	11	5	60.00
Braga	(Portugal)	26 May 1998	28 October 1998	13	3	5	5	23.08
Belenenses	(Portugal)	3 December 1998	16 May 2000	56	20	19	17	35.71
Rio Ave	(Portugal)	16 May 2000	2 December 2001	52	21	13	18	40.38
Gil Vicente	(Portugal)	23 December 2001	3 June 2003	55	20	10	25	36.36
Académica	(Portugal)	29 August 2003	18 December 2003	14	4	3	7	28.57
Moreirense	(Portugal)	7 June 2004	4 April 2005	29	6	10	13	20.69
Leixões	(Portugal)	23 February 2006	22 May 2007	44	27	10	7	61.36
União Leiria	(Portugal)	6 November 2007	12 May 2008	23	4	4	15	17.39
Trofense	(Portugal)	15 June 2009	8 February 2010	26	10	6	10	38.46
Aves	(Portugal)	25 October 2010	30 May 2011	30	11	9	10	36.67
Arouca	(Portugal)	21 September 2011	19 May 2013	76	32	22	22	42.11
Moreirense	(Portugal)	21 May 2013	10 March 2014	41	18	16	7	43.90
União Madeira	(Portugal)	27 May 2014	25 May 2015	56	27	15	14	48.21
Chaves	(Portugal)	10 June 2015	15 May 2016	50	22	20	8	44.00
Portimonense	(Portugal)	19 May 2016	15 May 2018	84	36	20	28	42.86
Paços Ferreira	(Portugal)	22 May 2018	20 May 2019	42	27	8	7	64.29
Gil Vicente	(Portugal)	20 May 2019	25 July 2020	40	14	10	16	35.00
Career totals				1,203	511	310	382	42.48

== Honours ==
=== Manager ===
Paços Ferreira

- Segunda Liga: 1990–91, 2018–19

União Leiria

- Segunda Liga: 1997–98

Leixões

- Segunda Liga: 2006–07

Moreirense

- Segunda Liga: 2013–14

Portimonense

- Segunda Liga: 2016–17

Individual

- Segunda Liga Best Coach: 2014–15, 2015–16, 2016–17, 2018–19
- Primeira Liga Manager of the Month: October/November 2019
