= Gorka Etxeberria =

Spanish football manager

Personal information
- Full name: Gorka Etxeberria Aldasoro
- Date of birth: 26 February 1972 (age 54)
- Place of birth: San Sebastián, Spain

Managerial career
- Years: Team
- 2004: Al Khaleej
- 2012–2013: Salamanca
- 2013: Atlético CP
- 2017: Sydney Olympic
- 2020: Real Unión (caretaker)

Gorka Etxeberria Aldasoro (born 26 February 1972) is a Spanish football manager and director of football.

He managed Salamanca and Real Unión in the Segunda División B, as well as Atlético of the Portuguese Segunda Liga and Sydney Olympic of the National Premier Leagues NSW.

Etxeberria had other roles in football, including as assistant manager at Zaragoza and Girona, and director of football at clubs including Alavés, Salamanca, Unionistas Salamanca and Real Unión.

== Career ==
=== Early career ===
Born in San Sebastián in the Basque Country, Etxeberria told Marca in 2024: "I was a bad footballer, but instead of developing repudiation I became more in love". He began coaching in 2004, with Al Khaleej Club in the United Arab Emirates. He was assistant manager to Javier Irureta at La Liga club Real Zaragoza in 2008, and to Javi Salamero at Girona FC in the Segunda División in 2009.

In December 2009, Etxeberria made himself available for the vacant managerial position at Dorchester Town in the Conference South, the sixth tier of the English football league system. He was made a consultant and first-team coach while the search for a permanent manager was delayed by legal issues between the club and its former chairman. In March 2010, caretaker manager Ashley Vickers was given the job permanently and Etxeberria returned to Spain to become director of football at Deportivo Alavés in the Segunda División B. He resigned from the club from Vitoria-Gasteiz in May 2011, with weeks of his contract remaining.

Etxeberria was hired as manager and director at UD Salamanca in June 2012, with the third-tier club being in serious economic problems. He was dismissed from his coaching position the following 4 March and replaced with B-team manager José María Hernández, as the club was dissolved at the end of the season. UDS was succeeded by the corporately related Salamanca CF UDS, and the fan-driven Unionistas de Salamanca CF; in 2019 Etxeberria said that he had spoken to Salamanca's mayor in a failed attempt to ensure there was only one successor.

=== Portugal and Australia ===
In August 2013, Etxeberria turned down an approach from Caudal Deportivo in Spain's third tier and a youth team from his hometown in order to join Atlético Clube de Portugal in the neighbouring country's Segunda Liga. Having taken 12 points from 14 games, and with the Lisbon-based club in 19th place, he left on 9 November.

After three years as director of CD Hernani in his native Gipuzkoa, Etxeberria headed abroad again in June 2017, on an 18-month deal at Sydney Olympic FC of the second-tier National Premier Leagues NSW. He was sacked on 2 March 2018 as the first dismissal of the season, and replaced by Abbas Saad. In February 2020, he and Chris Taylor of South Melbourne FC were awarded AU$80,000 in compensation each by a FIFA tribunal, which ruled that they were wrongfully dismissed.

=== Return to Spain ===
In June 2018, Etxeberria returned to Salamanca as director of Unionistas. He left in November 2019, with the club second from bottom. The following January, he was hired on an 18-month deal at Real Unión in his home province. On 25 February 2020, the club from Irun sacked Alberto Iturralde and put Etxeberria in caretaker charge as manager. In June 2021, with the club promoted to the new Primera Federación and under ownership of Unai Emery's family, he signed a one-year contract extension. He left at its end.

Etxeberria was hired in another directorial role at CF Rayo Majadahonda in June 2022. He lasted only weeks before being replaced by Néstor Susaeta. In January 2023, he returned to the city of Zaragoza after nearly 15 years away, joining CD Ebro in the same position.
