= Jorge Neves (footballer, born 1969) =

Portuguese football coach and former player

Personal information
- Full name: Jorge Alexandre Leal das Neves
- Date of birth: 21 December 1969 (age 56)
- Place of birth: Lisbon, Portugal
- Height: 1.75 m (5 ft 9 in)
- Position: Defender

Youth career
- 1984–1985: Monte Abraão
- 1985–1988: Estrela da Amadora

Senior career*
Years	Team	Apps	(Gls)
1988–1989	Marinhense		
1989–1990	Estrela da Amadora	0	(0)
1990–1991	Fafe	32	(0)
1991–1993	Fanhões		
1993–1995	Campomaiorense		
1995–2002	Beira-Mar	162	(6)
2002–2004	Chaves	27	(0)
2006–2007	São Marcos		

Managerial career
- 2008–2009: Beira-Mar (assistant)
- 2009–2010: Avanca
- 2010–2013: Beira-Mar (assistant)
- 2013–2014: Beira-Mar
- 2014: Beira-Mar (assistant)
- 2014: Beira-Mar
- 2015: Mafra
- * Club domestic league appearances and goals

Jorge Alexandre Leal das Neves (born 21 December 1969) is a Portuguese football coach and a former player.

== Club career ==
He made his Primeira Liga debut for Beira-Mar on 21 August 1998 in a game against Sporting Braga.

== Honours ==
Beira-Mar

- Taça de Portugal: 1998–99

== Personal life ==
His twin brother Rui Neves also played football professionally.
