= Bock (footballer) =

Portuguese footballer

Personal information
- Full name: Fernando Jorge Tavares de Oliveira
- Date of birth: 19 September 1975 (age 51)
- Place of birth: Vila Nova de Gaia, Portugal
- Height: 1.75 m (5 ft 9 in)
- Position: Striker

Youth career
- 1985–1987: Passarinhos da Ribeira
- 1987–1994: Porto

Senior career*
Years	Team	Apps	(Gls)
1994–1995	Maia	10	(1)
1995–1996	Amarante	32	(17)
1996–1997	Lixa	26	(6)
1997–2000	Freamunde	74	(45)
2000	Trofense	16	(11)
2000	Marco	7	(0)
2001	Ermesinde	22	(10)
2001–2002	Gondomar	36	(18)
2002–2003	Leixões	25	(9)
2003–2005	Freamunde	70	(54)
2005–2006	Vizela	37	(20)
2007–2013	Freamunde	194	(53)
2013–2014	Ribeirão	7	(1)
2014–2015	Rebordosa	44	(8)
2015–2016	Lixa	35	(11)
Total		635	(264)
- * Club domestic league appearances and goals

Fernando Jorge Tavares de Oliveira (born 19 September 1975), commonly known as Bock, is a Portuguese retired footballer who played as a striker.

He never played in the Primeira Liga in his professional career, which spanned nearly two decades, but appeared in 234 matches in the second division while scoring 71 goals, mostly with Freamunde.

== Football career ==
Born in Vila Nova de Gaia, Porto District, Bock joined FC Porto's youth ranks at the age of 12 and, even though he excelled at goalscoring during his formative years, never received a first-team opportunity, being released in 1994 and taking his game to the third division, where he had one-season spells with F.C. Maia, Amarante FC and F.C. Lixa.

In the 1997–98 season, Bock had his first spell with what would be his main club, S.C. Freamunde, scoring 30 goals to help the side promote from the fourth level, one of two consecutive. In the following seven years he played almost exclusively in division three, with very brief stints in the second tier; in 2004–05 he netted 32 in 34 matches for Freamunde, who could not however promote to the latter category.

Bock's finest moment in the second division of Portuguese football came in the 2005–06 campaign, as he led the scoring charts to help F.C. Vizela finish in 11th position, at 19 goals. In the 2007 January transfer window the veteran returned to Freamunde with the club in that same tier from 2007–08 onwards, going on to feature regularly until his departure at the age of 37.

== Club statistics ==
Club	Season	League		Cup		League Cup		Europe		Total	
Club	Season	Apps	Goals	Apps	Goals	Apps	Goals	Apps	Goals	Apps	Goals
Leixões	2002–03	25	9	0	0	-		-		25	9
Freamunde	2003–04	36	22	1	0	-		-		37	22
Freamunde	2004–05	34	32	0	0	-		-		34	32
Freamunde	Total	70	54	1	0	-		-		71	54
Vizela	2005–06	32	19	2	0	-		-		34	19
Vizela	2006–07	5	1	0	0	-		-		5	1
Vizela	Total	37	20	2	0	-		-		39	20
Freamunde	2006–07	15	3	0	0	-		-		15	3
Freamunde	2007–08	28	11	2	0	1	0	-		31	11
Freamunde	2008–09	27	4	2	0	4	0	-		33	4
Freamunde	2009–10	29	5	2	0	2	1	-		33	6
Freamunde	2010–11	28	15	1	0	3	0	-		32	15
Freamunde	2011–12	27	10	1	0	3	1	-		31	11
Freamunde	2012–13	31	4	2	0	5	2	-		38	6
Freamunde	Total	185	52	10	0	18	4	-		213	56
Career totals						18	4	-			

== Honours ==
=== Club ===
Freamunde

- Terceira Divisão: 1997–98
- Segunda Divisão B: 1998–99, 2006–07

Leixões

- Segunda Divisão B: 2002–03

=== Individual ===
- Segunda Liga Top scorer: 2010–11
- Segunda Liga Player of the Month: November 2010, February 2011
