= Banjai =

Guinea-Bissauan footballer

Personal information
- Full name: Saido Indjai
- Date of birth: 19 July 1981 (age 45)
- Place of birth: Bissau, Guinea-Bissau
- Height: 1.82 m (6 ft 0 in)
- Position: Centre back

Youth career
- 1997–2000: Porto

Senior career*
Years	Team	Apps	(Gls)
2000–2002	Porto B	21	(0)
2000–2001	→ Lusitânia (loan)	37	(0)
2001–2002	→ Ermesinde (loan)	16	(1)
2002–2003	União Lamas	28	(0)
2003–2004	Louletano	38	(3)
2004–2007	Covilhã	80	(8)
2007–2008	Louletano	12	(0)
2008–2014	Oliveirense	186	(10)
2015–2016	Leixões	6	(0)
2016–2017	Valadares Gaia	24	(3)

International career
2010–2014	Guinea-Bissau	11	(0)
- * Club domestic league appearances and goals as of 19 November 2017

Saido Indjai (born 19 July 1981), commonly known as Banjai, is a Guinea-Bissauan professional footballer who plays as a central defender.

== Club career ==
Born in Bissau, Banjai spent his entire career in Portugal. He amassed Segunda Liga totals of 250 matches and 11 goals during nine seasons, representing in the competition C.F. União de Lamas, S.C. Covilhã, U.D. Oliveirense and Leixões SC.
