= Vítor Bruno (footballer, born 1990) =

Portuguese footballer

Personal information
- Full name: Vítor Bruno Ramos Gonçalves
- Date of birth: 13 January 1990 (age 36)
- Place of birth: Vila do Conde, Portugal
- Height: 1.71 m (5 ft 7 in)
- Position: Left-back

Team information
- Current team: Espinho

Youth career
- 2002–2003: Famalicão
- 2003–2009: Porto
- 2005–2006: → Padroense (loan)
- 2007–2008: → Candal (loan)

Senior career*
Years	Team	Apps	(Gls)
2009–2010	Candal	23	(3)
2010–2011	Ribeirão	27	(5)
2011–2015	Penafiel	100	(10)
2015–2016	CFR Cluj	29	(2)
2016–2017	Feirense	30	(1)
2017–2018	Boavista	16	(0)
2018–2019	Feirense	28	(1)
2019–2020	Leixões	19	(0)
2020–2021	Vilafranquense	30	(3)
2021–2023	Académico Viseu	29	(3)
2023–2024	Alverca	30	(0)
2024–2025	Académica	17	(0)
2025–2026	Anadia	24	(1)
2026–	Espinho	6	(0)

International career
2008	Portugal U18	1	(0)
- * Club domestic league appearances and goals as of 16:56, 10 November 2026 (UTC)

Vítor Bruno Ramos Gonçalves (born 13 January 1990), known as Vítor Bruno, is a Portuguese professional footballer who plays as a left-back for Espinho.

== Club career ==
Born in Vila do Conde, Vítor Bruno began his youth career at F.C. Famalicão before joining FC Porto. He was also loaned to CD Candal, where he later made his senior debut in the fourth division in the 2009–10 season.

After a year in the third tier with G.D. Ribeirão, Vítor Bruno signed for F.C. Penafiel of the Segunda Liga in 2011. He was part of their squad that won promotion to the Primeira Liga in 2013–14, and scored once the following campaign to equalise a 3–2 away loss against Sporting CP on 9 March 2015.

On 31 May 2015, after Penafiel were relegated in last place, Vítor Bruno and teammate Dani Coelho signed three-year contracts at CFR Cluj in Romania's Liga I. Joined by compatriots including manager Toni Conceição, he won the Cupa României in his only season with a penalty shootout victory over FC Dinamo București on 17 May 2016.

Vítor Bruno returned to his country's top flight in June 2016, agreeing to a three-year deal at C.D. Feirense. The following off-season, however, he moved to Boavista F.C. on a two-year contract, but returned to his former club halfway through.

In April 2019, after already-relegated Feirense lost 4–1 at home to eventual champions S.L. Benfica, Vítor Bruno wrote a lengthy publication on Facebook lamenting the quality of his team's play. He became a free agent subsequently, and signed a one-year deal with second-division Leixões S.C. that August.

== Honours ==
CFR Cluj

- Cupa României: 2015–16
