= Carlos Azenha =

Portuguese football manager

Personal information
- Full name: Carlos Soares Azenha
- Date of birth: 4 November 1966 (age 59)
- Place of birth: Lisbon, Portugal

Team information
- Current team: Portimonense

Managerial career
- Years: Team
- 2000–2002: Vitória Setúbal (assistant)
- 2002–2003: Changsha Ginde (assistant)
- 2003–2004: Al-Ahly (assistant)
- 2005–2006: Boavista (assistant)
- 2006–2008: Porto (assistant)
- 2009: Vitória Setúbal
- 2010–2011: Portimonense
- 2011: Sharjah FC
- Portimonense

Carlos Soares Azenha (born 4 November 1966) is a Portuguese football manager.

== Coaching career ==
Born in Lisbon, Azenha started his career off at Vitória de Setúbal as assistant manager to Jorge Jesus from 2000 to 2002. From there, he worked in the same post at China's Changsha Ginde and Egyptian club Al-Ahly under compatriot Toni. In 2005, he came home to work at Boavista under Jesualdo Ferreira, and followed him to FC Porto a year later.

In June 2009, Azenha was given his first managerial job at Setúbal. He was sacked on 15 September, having begun the Primeira Liga season with a goalless draw against Vitória de Guimarães and followed it with three consecutive defeats to sit in last place.

On 29 December 2010, Azenha returned to the top flight as manager of second-last Portimonense. He offered to resign in February, having not won any of his first five games, but was kept on by the board.

In June 2011, just after Portimonense's relegation, Azenha went back abroad with Sharjah FC in the United Arab Emirates. He resigned less than three months later, due to his wife's illness.

Azenha returned to Portimonense in February 2015, joining a club in 9th place in the second tier and six points off the promotion places. He left by mutual consent at the end of March, having won two and lost five out of ten fixtures.
