= Predrag Jokanović =

Serbian footballer and manager

Personal information
- Full name: Predrag Jokanović
- Date of birth: 26 October 1968 (age 58)
- Place of birth: Belgrade, SFR Yugoslavia
- Height: 1.86 m (6 ft 1 in)
- Position: Defensive midfielder

Youth career
- 1985–1988: Zemun

Senior career*
Years	Team	Apps	(Gls)
1988–1991	Zemun	44	(3)
1988–1989	→ Spartak Subotica (loan)	13	(0)
1991–1993	OFK Kikinda	25	(8)
1993–1995	União Madeira	41	(10)
1995–2001	Marítimo	137	(8)
2001	Marítimo B	1	(1)
2001–2003	Nacional	35	(1)
Total		295	(30)

Managerial career
- 2007–2008: Nacional
- 2009–2010: Nacional
- 2010–2011: Nacional
- 2011–2013: União Madeira
- 2014: Bravos do Maquis
- 2016–2017: Nacional
- * Club domestic league appearances and goals

Predrag Jokanović (Serbian Cyrillic: Пpeдpaг Јокановић; born 26 October 1968) is a Serbian retired professional footballer, and is a manager.

In his playing days, spent almost exclusively in Portugal – exactly ten years, nine of those in the Primeira Liga, where he amassed totals of 191 matches and 18 goals – he played mainly as a defensive midfielder (although he could occasionally appear as a central defender).

After retiring in 2003, Jokanović took on a managerial career in the same country. His son Luka Jokanović is also a Portuguese-Serbian footballer

== Playing career ==
Born in Belgrade, Jokanović spent the vast majority of his professional playing career on the Portuguese island of Madeira, appearing for each of the region's biggest clubs. He started at C.F. União in 1993 in the Primeira Liga and, when the team was relegated two years later, he transferred to neighbours C.S. Marítimo, enjoying six steady seasons in which he inclusively played in the 1998–99 edition of the UEFA Cup, losing to Leeds United on penalties.

In 2001, after helping his side to the final of the Cup of Portugal, Jokanović was released, and promptly signed for C.D. Nacional who competed in the second division. After just one season at the club he helped it win promotion, and played there for one more year before retiring at almost 35 years of age.

== Coaching career ==
After almost two years in charge of their under-19 team, Jokanović was appointed manager of Nacional midway through 2006–07, and left the club at the end of the following campaign. After two years as an assistant – he also acted as scout and match observer – he was re-signed on 13 December 2009, replacing Manuel Machado who was recovering from surgery-related complications.

At the end of the 2009–10 season, Jokanović definitely replaced Machado at Nacional's helm, profiting from the opportunity by signing several of his former compatriots (one Montenegrin, one Slovene and three Croats), as his teams rarely fielded more than two or three Portuguese players.

On 13 March 2011, following a 1–1 home draw against Académica de Coimbra – who equalized in the 92nd minute – Jokanović was fired by Nacional. He remained connected with the team subsequently, in the scouting department.

Jokanović returned to União da Madeira on 11 November 2011 (after 18 years), being appointed head coach at the second-level club. At the end of the 2012–13 campaign, he left.

In 2014, Jokanović was appointed manager of Angolan Girabola club FC Bravos do Maquis, and was sacked before the last game of the season with his team in sixth place. On 30 December 2016 he returned to Nacional for a fourth spell, again replacing Machado.
