= S.C. Beira-Mar =

Portuguese sports club

Beira-Mar
- Full name: Sport Clube Beira-Mar
- Nickname: Auri-negros (Gold-and-Blacks)
- Founded: 31 December 1922; 103 years ago
- Ground: Estádio Municipal de Aveiro
- Capacity: 32,830
- Chairman: Nuno Quintaneiro
- Manager: Fabeta
- League: Campeonato de Portugal
- 2025–26: Campeonato de Portugal, Serie B, 4th of 14
Home colours	Away colours	Third colours

Sport Clube Beira-Mar (Portuguese pronunciation: [sɨˈpɔɾ ˈkluβɨ ˈβɐjɾɐ ˈmaɾ]), commonly known as Beira-Mar, is a Portuguese sports club based in Aveiro, Portugal. Its football team currently plays in the Campeonato de Portugal, the fourth national level, having gained promotion by winning the Aveiro FA First Division 2018/19 championship season. The old Estádio Mário Duarte was the home ground from 1935 until 2019. From 2020, SC Beira-Mar plays home matches at Estádio Municipal de Aveiro. The club also has futsal, basketball, boxing, judo, handball, billiards, athletics, and paintball departments.

Famous Portuguese players who have represented the club include Eusébio, António Veloso, and António Sousa. All three players have regularly been chosen for the Portugal national team and have played for the biggest clubs in the country—the former two with Benfica and the latter with both Porto and Sporting CP. After becoming a manager, Sousa also coached the team, guiding it to win the 1999 Taça de Portugal.

== History ==
Evolution of Sport Clube Beira-Mar's league performances since 1938

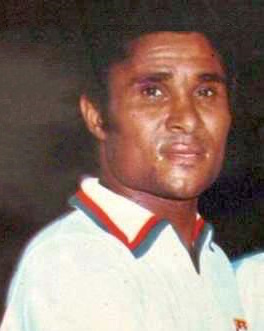
Eusébio, one of the world's greatest footballers, played for Beira-Mar in the 1976–77 season.

Beira-Mar was founded on 1 January 1922. It first reached the top division in 1961, only lasting one season. Subsequently, Beira-Mar reached the top flight several times enjoying a spell lasting from 1971 to 1974. In the 1976–77 campaign, former S.L. Benfica and Portugal legend Eusébio signed up to play for Beira-Mar, requesting to be excluded in all matches against S.L. Benfica. Injuries prevented him from being fielded regularly, and the campaign ended in relegation.

In 1988 Beira-Mar returned to the "Primeira Divisão" managing to remain there most of the following years and achieving a best ever sixth place overall finish in the 1990/91 top league season and also reaching the Cup final. In 1999 the club again reached the Cup final, this time defeating S.C. Campomaiorense 1–0 to win the Taça de Portugal. Beira-Mar's goal was scored by Ricardo Sousa, son of coach António Sousa, who played for the club in the 1970s. Despite winning its biggest honour to date, the team was relegated at season's end.

As the UEFA Cup Winners' Cup was discontinued in 1999, Beira-Mar participated in the 1999–2000 UEFA Cup, losing 1–2 on aggregate to Dutch club Vitesse. In the domestic league, the club finished second place in the second division, automatically returning to the top flight. On 23 February 2002, Beira-Mar achieved a 3–2 away win against FC Porto, which was managed by a young José Mourinho; it would be his last home defeat in the following decade.

In 2006, former European Golden Shoe winner Mário Jardel returned to Portugal to play for Beira-Mar, signing a one-year contract. The Brazilian scored in his official debut, a 2–2 home draw against Desportivo das Aves, but gradually lost his importance in the team and later transferred to a club in Cyprus. In 2007 Beira-Mar was relegated in a campaign that included the sacking of manager Carlos Carvalhal, who was replaced by Spaniard Francisco Soler after the team signed a deal with Inverfutbol, a Spanish-based sporting company.

In 2010, Beira-Mar finished the season as second division champions and returned to the top division after a three-year absence. In 2013, the team was relegated to the second division for finishing in last place. In 2015, Beira-Mar was demoted by administrative decree to the second-lowest league of the Aveiro FA district (Associação de Futebol de Aveiro), the fifth lowest overall level in the pyramid, despite finishing tenth, due to financial difficulties and debt. According to the FA legislation, the club was found ineligible to participate in national competitions and had to restart competitive activity from the bottom in the regional levels.

Following promotions in 2016 and 2019, Beira-Mar returned to the national leagues, entering the third-tier Campeonato de Portugal for the 2019–20 season.

== Current squad ==
As of 7 June 2026

Note: Flags indicate national team as defined under FIFA eligibility rules; some limited exceptions apply. Players may hold more than one non-FIFA nationality.

No.	Pos.	Nation	Player
1	GK	MKD	Tomás Bozinoski
2	DF	POR	Tiago Melo
4	DF	POR	Sérgio Silva
6	DF	POR	Diogo Abdul
8	MF	POR	Pedro Pinto
9	FW	POR	Muacir
10	MF	BRA	Pietro Romano
11	FW	POR	João Pedra
12	GK	POR	Pedro Neves
13	DF	POR	Bruno Cruz
15	DF	POR	Rúben Ferreira
17	MF	ANG	Domilson Kipanda

No.	Pos.	Nation	Player
19	FW	CIV	Isaac Cissé
20	DF	POR	Francisco Sancho
24	FW	POR	Didi
25	FW	BRA	Marcelinho
31	MF	ENG	Oliver Parkes
33	DF	POR	Tomás Sério
38	DF	POR	André Alves
70	GK	POR	Carlos Madureira
78	FW	POR	Sérgio Santos
80	MF	POR	Diogo Sancho
82	MF	POR	Tiago Luís

== League and Cup history ==
Season		Pos.	Pl.	W	D	L	GS	GA	P	Cup	Europe		Notes
1961–62	1D	11	26	8	5	13	43	61	21				
1965–66	1D	11	26	6	6	14	31	65	18				
1966–67	1D	14	26	5	4	17	23	58	14				
1971–72	1D	13	30	7	9	14	29	51	23				
1972–73	1D	12	30	5	13	12	27	57	23				
1973–74	1D	13	30	7	7	16	34	59	21				
1975–76	1D	13	30	6	9	15	28	47	21				
1976–77	1D	13	30	7	9	14	33	57	23				
1978–79	1D	12	30	11	2	17	44	56	24				
1979–80	1D	15	30	5	10	15	24	46	20				
1988–89	1D	15	38	10	13	15	29	36	33				
1989–90	1D	11	34	10	9	15	22	39	29				
1990–91	1D	6	38	12	12	14	40	49	36	Runners-up			
1991–92	1D	8	34	11	10	13	32	41	32				
1992–93	1D	8	34	10	12	12	24	33	32				
1993–94	1D	14	34	9	11	14	28	38	29				
1994–95	1D	17	34	8	5	21	33	54	21				
1998–99	1D	16	34	6	15	13	36	53	33	Winners			
1999–00	2D	2	34	18	11	5	54	30	65		UC	1st round	Promoted
2000–01	1D	8	34	14	7	13	45	49	49				
2001–02	1D	11	34	10	9	15	48	56	39				
2002–03	1D	13	34	10	9	15	43	50	39				
2003–04	1D	11	34	11	8	15	36	45	41				
2004–05	1D	18	34	6	12	16	30	56	30				Relegated
2005–06	2D	1	34	18	14	2	45	18	68	Last 128			Promoted
2006–07	1D	18	30	4	11	15	28	55	23	4th round			Relegated
2007–08	2D	6	30	10	12	8	30	32	42	6th round			
2008–09	2D	12	30	8	11	11	32	32	35	4th round			
2009–10	2D	1	30	16	6	8	44	30	54	4th round			Promoted
2010–11	1D	13	30	7	12	11	32	36	33	4th round			
2011–12	1D	12	30	8	5	17	26	38	29	3rd round			
2012–13	1D	16	30	5	8	17	35	55	23	5th round			Relegated
2013–14	2D	12	42	14	12	16	45	48	54	5th round			
2014–15	2D	10	46	16	15	15	55	48	63	3rd round			Relegated
2015–16	6D	1	36	27	5	4	105	16	81				Promoted
2016-2017	5D	4	34	18	10	6	51	37	64				
2017–18	5D	2	34	22	4	8	69	37	70				
2018-19	5D	1	34	27	6	1	75	24	87				Promoted
2019-20	4D	6	25	9	10	6	34	27	37	4th round			
2020-21	4D	9	22	9	4	9	30	23	31	3rd round			Relegated
2021-22	5D	1	22	20	0	2	56	14	60				Promoted
2022-23	4D	4	26	13	9	4	35	21	48	RO16			
2023-24	4D	9	26	8	10	8	31	31	34	1st round			
2024-25	4D	5	26	10	9	7	31	28	39	1st round			

== European record ==
By qualifying to play in the 1999 edition of UEFA Cup, Beira-Mar became the second team from a second division to appear in the competition, after Bray Wanderers from the Republic of Ireland in 1990.

Season	Competition	Round	Opponent	Home	Away	Aggregate
1999–2000	UEFA Cup	1R	(Netherlands) Vitesse	1–2	0–0	1–2

== Honours ==
=== National ===
- Taça de Portugal
  - Winners (1): 1998–99
  - Runners-up (1): 1990–91
- Supertaça Cândido de Oliveira
  - Runners-up (1): 1999
- Segunda Liga
  - Winners (2): 2005–06, 2009–10
- Segunda Divisão
  - Winners (3): 1960–61, 1964–65, 1970–71
- Terceira Divisão
  - Winners (1): 1958–59

=== Other ===
- Taça Ribeiro dos Reis
  - Winners (1): 1964–65
- AF Aveiro Championship
  - Winners (4): 1928–29, 1937–38, 2018–19, 2021–22
- AF Aveiro First Division
  - Winners (3): 1948–49, 1955–56, 1958–59
- AF Aveiro Cup
  - Winners (2): 2017–18, 2021–22
- AF Aveiro Supercup
  - Winners (2): 2019, 2021

== Stadiums ==
From 1935 until 2019, Beira-Mar played home games at Estádio Mário Duarte, a 12,000- seating capacity ground in the city center. However, during this time, there were exceptions to Mario Duarte stadium use exclusivity when Beira-Mar occasionally used the new Municipal Stadium, purpose-built for the 2004 Euro Championship. After the 2015 relegation, due to the poor economic situation of the club, Mario Duarte Stadium played an important role in the team recovering their support base due to the ease of access by the local fans.

Due to the stadium's ground being conveniently situated next door, the latest city planning and infrastructure developments require the area presently occupied by Mario Duarte Stadium for the long waiting expansion of Aveiro's main regional hospital. As a result of these developments, the city authorities reached a deal with the club for the use of the new Estádio Municipal de Aveiro by Beira-Mar SC.

This modern 32,830-seat stadium was purpose built to host some matches in the 2004 Euro Championship, is currently undergoing further development on its adjoining grounds by the Aveiro Football Association to establish new training facilities and a football academy. Nevertheless, due to the stadium's position being about 5 km outside the city limits next to the highway, does not enjoy public transportation accesses or shuttle services, thus, it never was very popular with Beira-Mar home or visiting supporters, who preferred the old historical stadium's cosiness and ease of access. To counter the stadium's lack of popularity due to accessibility problems, the local authorities are studying the implementation of a new shuttle service scheme incorporating the metropolitan bus services for match days, to help supporters reach the stadium easily. A passenger link from Aveiro railway station could also become a reality in the future by using the existing Vouga railway line that passes a few hundred meters from the stadium.

== Notable players ==
Note: this list includes players who have played at least 100 league games and/or have reached international status.

- (Australia) Eugene Galeković
- (Brazil) Mário Jardel
- (Canada) Fernando Aguiar
- (Czech Republic) Pavel Srníček
- (Egypt) Magdi Abdelghani
- (Equatorial Guinea) Javier Balboa
- (Iran) Hossein Kanaanizadegan
- (Malaysia) Nazmi Faiz
- (Mali) Mourtala Diakité
- (Montenegro) Andrija Delibašić
- (Paraguay) Antolín Alcaraz
- (Portugal) Dinis
- (Portugal) Eduardo Carvalho
- (Portugal) Sérgio Oliveira
- (Slovenia) Jan Oblak
- (Portugal) Eusébio
- (Portugal) António Sousa
- (Portugal) António Veloso
- (Senegal) Fary Faye
- (Slovakia) Marián Zeman
- (South Africa) Jan Lechaba
- (Sweden) Tobias Grahn
- (Wales) Andy Marriott

== Managers ==
- (Portugal) Fernando Vaz (1975 – 76)
- (Portugal) Fernando Cabrita (1977 – 79)
- (Brazil) Mário Lino (1986 – 87)
- (Belgium) Jean Thissen (1987 – 90)
- (Portugal) Vítor Urbano (6 February 1990 – 30 June 1993)
- (Serbia and Montenegro) Zoran Filipović (1 July 1993 – 30 June 1994)
- (Portugal) Rodolfo Reis (1 July 1994 – 16 April 1995)
- (Brazil) Acácio (interim) (30 April 1995 – 30 June 1995)
- (Portugal) Álvaro Carolino (1995 – 1996)
- (Portugal) Manuel Gonçalves (1996)
- (Portugal) Paulino Silva (1 April 1996 – 30 June 1996)
- (Portugal) Vítor Urbano (1 July 1996 – 17 February 1997)
- (Portugal) António Sousa (18 February 1997 – 30 June 2004)
- (England) Mick Wadsworth (1 July 2004 – 27 September 2004)
- (Portugal) Manuel Cajuda (29 September 2004 – 15 December 2004)
- (Portugal) Paulino Silva (interim) (16 December 2004 – 27 December 2004)
- (Portugal) Luís Campos (28 December 2004 – 3 April 2005)
- (Portugal) Augusto Inácio (4 April 2005 – 7 November 2006)
- (Portugal) Carlos Carvalhal (10 November 2006 – 8 January 2007)
- (Spain) Paco Soler (9 January 2007 – 23 May 2007)
- (Portugal) Rogério Gonçalves (31 May 2007 – 4 February 2008)
- (Portugal) Paulo Sérgio (8 February 2008 – 30 June 2008)
- (Portugal) António Sousa (1 July 2008 – 10 November 2008)
- (Portugal) Bruno Moura (11 November 2008 – 25 May 2009)
- (Portugal) Leonardo Jardim (1 July 2009 – 28 February 2011)
- (Portugal) Rui Bento (1 March 2011 – 27 February 2012)
- (Portugal) Ulisses Morais (27 February 2012 – 16 February 2013)
- (Portugal) Costinha (17 February 2013 – 30 June 2013)
- (Portugal) Jorge Neves (1 July 2013 – 30 January 2014)
- (Italy) Daniele Fortunato (30 January 2014 – 30 June 2014)
- (Portugal) Jorge Neves (1 July 2014 – 16 December 2014)
- (Portugal) Paulo Alves (27 December 2014 – 30 June 2015)
- (Portugal) José Alexandre (2015 – 2017)
- (Portugal) Augusto Semedo (2017)
- (Portugal) Carlos Miguel (1 July 2017 – 2 October 2017)
- (Portugal) Cajó (3 October 2017 – 30 June 2019)
- (Portugal) Ricardo Sousa (1 July 2019 – 22 February 2021)
- (Portugal) Manuel Rodrigues (2021)
- (Portugal) Ricardo Maia (1 July 2021 – 21 December 2022)
- (Portugal) Miguel Valença (27 December 2022 – 4 February 2024)
- (Portugal) João Almeida (interim) (2024)
- (Portugal) Eurico Couto (12 February 2024 – 30 June 2024)
- (Portugal) António Oliveira (1 July 2024 – 17 February 2025)
- (Portugal) Fabeta (18 February 2025 – present)
