= 2011–12 Primeira Liga =

78th season of top-tier Portuguese football

Primeira Liga
- Season: 2011–12
- Dates: 12 August 2011 – 13 May 2012
- Champions: Porto; 26th title
- Relegated: União de Leiria; Feirense
- Champions League: Porto; Benfica; Braga
- Europa League: Académica; Sporting CP; Marítimo
- Matches: 240
- Goals: 634 (2.64 per match)
- Best Player: Hulk
- Top goalscorer: Óscar Cardozo; Lima (20 goals each)
- Best goalkeeper: Rui Patrício
- Biggest home win: Porto 5−0 Nacional; Sporting CP 6−1 Gil Vicente; Sporting CP 5−0 Vitória de Guimarães
- Biggest away win: Paços de Ferreira 1−5 Vitória de Guimarães; União de Leiria 0−4 Benfica; União de Leiria 0−4 Feirense
- Highest scoring: Olhanense 4−4 Nacional
- Longest winning run: Braga 13 games (9 December 2011–26 March 2012)
- Longest unbeaten run: Benfica 18 games (12 August 2011–11 February 2012)
- Longest winless run: Académica 16 games (18 December 2011–30 April 2012)
- Longest losing run: Académica 6 games (18 March 2012–30 April 2012)
- Total attendance: 2,629,950
- Average attendance: 10,958

The 2011–12 Primeira Liga (also known as Liga ZON Sagres for sponsorship reasons) was the 78th season of the Primeira Liga, the top professional league for Portuguese association football clubs. It began on 14 August 2011 and ended on 13 May 2012. A total of 16 teams contested the league, 14 of which already took part in the previous season and two of which were promoted from the Liga de Honra. Porto were the defending champions and secured their 26th and second consecutive league title. Óscar Cardozo and Lima, respectively Benfica's and Braga's strikers, were the joint top scorers with 20 goals.

== Teams ==
Sixteen teams contested the league, fourteen of which already contested in the 2010–11 season and two of which were promoted from the 2010–11 Liga de Honra. The two teams relegated following the 2010–11 season were Portimonense, which returned to the Liga de Honra just a year after promotion, and Naval, returning to the second tier after a six-year stay. Replacing them in the top flight were Liga de Honra champions Gil Vicente, competing in their 14th Liga season after returning from a five-year absence, and Feirense, who were in the top division for the fourth time and the first since the 1989–90 season.

=== Stadia and locations ===
Location of teams in Liga Zon Sagres 2011–12
Location of teams in Liga Zon Sagres 2011–12

Team	Home city	Stadium	Capacity	2010–11	Current Spell
Académica	Coimbra	Estádio Cidade de Coimbra	30,210	14th	2002–03
Beira-Mar	Aveiro	Estádio Municipal de Aveiro	30,127	13th	2010–11
Benfica	Lisbon	Estádio da Luz	65,467	Runner-up	1934–35
Braga	Braga	Estádio Municipal de Braga	30,152	3rd	1974–75
Feirense	Santa Maria da Feira	Estádio Marcolino de Castro	4,667	Liga de Honra Runner-up	2011–12
Gil Vicente	Barcelos	Estádio Cidade de Barcelos	12,374	Liga de Honra Champion	2011–12
Marítimo	Funchal	Estádio dos Barreiros	8,922	9th	1985–86
Nacional	Funchal	Estádio da Madeira	5,132	6th	2002–03
Olhanense	Olhão	Estádio José Arcanjo	11,622	11th	2009–10
Paços de Ferreira	Paços de Ferreira	Estádio da Mata Real	5,255	7th	2005–06
Porto	Porto	Estádio do Dragão	50,399	Champion	1934–35
Rio Ave	Vila do Conde	Estádio dos Arcos	12,815	8th	2008–09
Sporting CP	Lisbon	Estádio José Alvalade	50,080	4th	1934–35
União de Leiria	Leiria	Estádio Municipal da Marinha Grande	8,378	10th	2009–10
Vitória de Guimarães	Guimarães	Estádio D. Afonso Henriques	30,165	5th	2007–08
Vitória de Setúbal	Setúbal	Estádio do Bonfim	18,692	12th	2004–05

=== Personnel and kits ===
Note: Flags indicate national team as has been defined under FIFA eligibility rules. Players and Managers may hold more than one non-FIFA nationality.

Team	Head coach	Captain	Kit manufacturer	Shirt sponsor
Académica	(Portugal) Pedro Emanuel	(Portugal) Orlando	Lacatoni	EFAPEL
Beira-Mar	(Portugal) Rui Bento	(Portugal) Hugo Vieira	Joma	Diatosta
Benfica	(Portugal) Jorge Jesus	(Brazil) Luisão	Adidas	TMN (H) / MEO (A)
Braga	(Portugal) Leonardo Jardim	(Brazil) Alan	Macron	AXA
Feirense	(Portugal) Quim Machado	(Brazil) Luciano	Adidas	E.Leclerc / BetClic
Gil Vicente	(Portugal) Paulo Alves	(Portugal) Paulo Arantes	Madsport	GIVEC / Águas de Barcelos / Glassdrive
Marítimo	(Portugal) Pedro Martins	(Brazil) João Guilherme	Lacatoni	Banif
Nacional	(Portugal) Pedro Caixinha	(Brazil) Felipe Lopes	Joma	Banif
Olhanense	(Portugal) Sérgio Conceição	(Portugal) Rui Duarte	Lacatoni	Ria Shopping
Paços de Ferreira	(Portugal) Henrique Calisto	(Portugal) Filipe Anunciação	Lacatoni	Capital do Móvel
Porto	(Portugal) Vítor Pereira	(Brazil) Helton	Nike	MEO (H) / TMN (A)
Rio Ave	(Portugal) Carlos Brito	(Portugal) José Gaspar	Lacatoni	Nassica
Sporting CP	(Portugal) Ricardo Sá Pinto	(Portugal) Daniel Carriço	Puma	TMN (H) / MEO (A)
União de Leiria	(Portugal) José Dominguez	(Cape Verde) Marco Soares	Joma	Kia
Vitória de Guimarães	(Portugal) Rui Vitória	(Portugal) João Alves	Lacatoni	Finibanco
Vitória de Setúbal	(Portugal) Bruno Ribeiro	(Portugal) Ricardo Silva	Lacatoni	Kia

=== Managerial changes ===
Team	Outgoing manager	Manner of departure	Date of vacancy	Replaced by	Date of appointment	Position in table
Porto	(Portugal) André Villas-Boas	Resigned/Signed by Chelsea	21 June 2011	(Portugal) Vítor Pereira	22 June 2011	Pre-season
Vitória de Guimarães	(Portugal) Manuel Machado	Resigned	26 August 2011	(Portugal) Rui Vitória	30 August 2011	16th
Paços de Ferreira	(Portugal) Rui Vitória	Signed by Vitória de Guimarães	30 August 2011	(Portugal) Luís Miguel	30 August 2011	9th
União de Leiria	(Portugal) Pedro Caixinha	Sacked	6 September 2011	(Portugal) Vítor Pontes	8 September 2011	16th
União de Leiria	(Portugal) Vítor Pontes	Resigned	26 September 2011	(Portugal) Manuel Cajuda	26 September 2011	16th
Nacional	(Portugal) Ivo Vieira	Resigned	31 October 2011	(Portugal) Pedro Caixinha	31 October 2011	12th
Paços de Ferreira	(Portugal) Luís Miguel	Sacked	27 November 2011	(Portugal) Henrique Calisto	30 November 2011	16th
Olhanense	(Mozambique) Daúto Faquirá	Resigned	30 December 2011	(Portugal) Sérgio Conceição	1 January 2012	10th
Sporting CP	(Portugal) Domingos Paciência	Sacked	13 February 2012	(Portugal) Ricardo Sá Pinto	13 February 2012	4th
Beira-Mar	(Portugal) Rui Bento	Resigned	26 February 2012	(Portugal) Ulisses Morais	27 February 2012	13th
Feirense	(Portugal) Quim Machado	Sacked	2 April 2012	(Portugal) Henrique Nunes	2 April 2012	16th

== League table ==
Pos	Team	Pld	W	D	L	GF	GA	GD	Pts	Qualification or relegation
1	Porto (C)	30	23	6	1	69	19	+50	75	Qualification to Champions League group stage
2	Benfica	30	21	6	3	66	27	+39	69	Qualification to Champions League group stage
3	Braga	30	19	5	6	59	29	+30	62	Qualification to Champions League play-off round
4	Sporting CP	30	18	5	7	47	26	+21	59	Qualification to Europa League play-off round
5	Marítimo	30	14	8	8	41	38	+3	50	Qualification to Europa League third qualifying round
6	Vitória de Guimarães	30	14	3	13	40	40	0	45	
7	Nacional	30	13	5	12	48	50	−2	44	
8	Olhanense	30	9	12	9	36	38	−2	39	
9	Gil Vicente	30	8	10	12	31	42	−11	34	
10	Paços de Ferreira	30	8	7	15	35	53	−18	31	
11	Vitória de Setúbal	30	8	6	16	24	49	−25	30	
12	Beira-Mar	30	8	5	17	26	38	−12	29 (Note: Beira-Mar ahead of Académica on head-to-head record; Académica–Beira-Mar 0–1, Beira-Mar–Académica 2–1)	
13	Académica	30	7	8	15	27	38	−11	29	Qualification to Europa League group stage (Note: Académica qualified for the group stage of 2012–13 UEFA Europa League after winning the 2011–12 Taça de Portugal.)
14	Rio Ave	30	7	7	16	33	42	−9	28	
15	Feirense (R)	30	5	9	16	27	49	−22	24	Relegation to Segunda Liga
16	União de Leiria (R)	30	5	4	21	25	56	−31	19	Relegation to Segunda Liga

Source: LPFP (in Portuguese)
Rules for classification: 1) Points; 2) Head-to-head points; 3) Head-to-head goal difference; 4) Head-to-head away goals scored; 5) Goal difference; 6) Matches won; 7) Goals scored; 8) Play-off.
(Note: LPFP decided that only criteria 1, 5, 6 and 7 would be applied to establish the classification during the competition.)
(C) Champions; (R) Relegated

=== Positions by round ===
Team ╲ Round	1	2	3	4	5	6	7	8	9	10	11	12	13	14	15	16	17	18	19	20	21	22	23	24	25	26	27	28	29	30
Porto	3	1	1	1	1	1	1	1	1	1	1	1	1	2	2	2	2	2	2	1	1	1	1	2	1	1	1	1	1	1
Benfica	4	3	2	2	2	2	2	2	2	2	2	2	2	1	1	1	1	1	1	2	2	2	2	3	2	2	2	2	2	2
Braga	8	4	3	3	3	3	3	4	4	5	5	4	4	4	3	3	3	3	3	3	3	3	3	1	3	3	3	3	3	3
Sporting CP	6	9	12	7	6	6	4	3	3	3	3	3	3	3	4	4	4	4	4	4	4	4	5	5	5	4	4	4	4	4
Marítimo	8	14	10	5	4	4	5	5	5	4	4	5	5	5	5	5	5	5	5	5	5	5	4	4	4	5	5	5	5	5
Vitória de Guimarães	16	6	11	13	12	12	14	16	13	10	8	9	9	7	6	6	6	6	6	6	6	6	6	6	6	6	6	6	6	6
Nacional	8	15	15	16	14	14	12	13	10	12	12	15	14	10	11	8	10	10	8	7	8	8	9	8	7	7	7	7	7	7
Olhanense	6	8	6	8	8	7	8	6	7	6	6	7	10	11	8	9	7	8	7	8	7	7	7	7	8	9	8	8	8	8
Gil Vicente	4	12	7	11	11	8	9	9	8	8	7	8	8	9	10	11	9	7	9	9	9	11	8	9	10	11	11	9	9	9
Paços de Ferreira	14	7	9	10	13	13	15	11	14	16	16	16	16	16	16	16	14	12	12	12	12	12	11	10	11	10	10	12	10	10
Vitória de Setúbal	1	5	8	12	7	9	7	8	9	9	11	12	12	14	14	15	16	15	16	14	13	14	13	12	9	8	9	10	11	11
Beira-Mar	8	10	5	6	10	10	10	10	12	11	9	10	7	8	9	10	11	13	13	13	14	13	14	14	14	12	13	11	12	12
Académica	2	2	4	4	5	5	6	7	6	7	10	6	6	6	7	7	8	9	10	10	10	10	12	13	13	14	14	15	14	13
Rio Ave	8	11	14	15	16	16	16	15	16	14	15	13	15	12	13	13	12	11	11	11	11	9	10	11	12	13	12	13	13	14
Feirense	8	13	13	9	9	11	11	12	15	15	13	14	11	13	12	12	13	14	14	15	15	15	16	16	16	16	15	14	15	15
União de Leiria	14	16	16	14	15	15	13	14	11	13	14	11	13	15	15	14	15	16	15	16	16	16	15	15	15	15	16	16	16	16

Leader
2012–13 UEFA Champions League Group stage
2012–13 UEFA Champions League Third qualifying round
2012–13 UEFA Europa League Play-off round
2012–13 UEFA Europa League Third qualifying round
Relegation to 2012–13 Liga de Honra

Source: AllTimeSoccer.com

== Results ==
Home \ Away	ACA	BEM	BEN	BRA	FEI	GVI	MAR	NAC	OLH	PAÇ	POR	RAV	SCP	ULE	VGU	VSE
Académica		0–1	0–0	0–0	4–0	0–2	0–1	4–0	0–1	0–1	0–3	1–0	1–1	0–0	0–2	1–0
Beira-Mar	2–1		0–1	1–2	2–1	1–0	1–2	0–3	1–2	2–0	1–2	0–0	0–0	0–1	0–1	2–3
Benfica	4–1	3–1		2–1	3–1	3–1	4–1	4–1	2–1	4–1	2–3	5–1	1–0	1–0	2–1	4–1
Braga	2–1	1–0	1–1		3–0	3–1	2–0	2–0	1–2	5–2	0–1	2–1	2–1	2–1	4–0	3–0
Feirense	1–1	1–3	1–2	1–4		0–0	2–2	0–0	1–1	0–0	0–0	2–0	0–2	2–1	1–3	1–0
Gil Vicente	2–0	0–0	2–2	0–3	3–1		0–0	0–3	1–1	1–2	3–1	0–0	2–0	2–1	3–1	0–1
Marítimo	3–2	0–0	0–1	1–2	2–1	3–2		2–4	2–1	1–1	0–2	2–1	2–0	1–0	2–1	1–0
Nacional	4–1	2–1	0–2	1–3	2–0	3–1	2–2		1–0	1–0	0–2	2–1	2–3	2–2	1–4	1–1
Olhanense	0–2	2–1	0–0	3–4	1–2	0–0	0–0	4–4		1–2	0–0	0–2	0–0	2–1	1–0	2–2
Paços de Ferreira	2–0	0–3	1–2	1–1	3–1	1–2	1–1	0–2	1–1		1–1	2–2	2–3	2–1	1–5	2–1
Porto	1–1	3–0	2–2	3–2	2–0	3–1	2–0	5–0	2–0	3–0		2–0	2–0	4–0	3–1	3–0
Rio Ave	0–0	4–0	2–2	0–0	2–2	2–0	1–3	2–1	0–1	1–0	2–5		2–3	2–0	0–1	3–0
Sporting CP	2–1	2–0	1–0	3–2	1–0	6–1	2–3	1–0	1–1	1–0	0–0	1–0		3–1	5–0	3–0
União de Leiria	1–2	0–0	0–4	1–0	0–4	0–0	1–3	2–3	1–3	2–4	2–5	1–0	0–1		1–0	2–0
Vitória de Guimarães	1–2	0–3	1–0	1–1	1–0	1–1	1–0	1–0	2–2	3–1	0–1	2–1	0–1	3–2		3–0
Vitória de Setúbal	1–1	1–0	1–3	0–1	1–1	0–0	1–1	0–3	2–3	2–1	1–3	2–1	1–0	1–0	1–0	

Source: LPFP (in Portuguese)
Legend: Blue = home team win; Yellow = draw; Red = away team win.

== Season statistics ==
=== Top goalscorers ===
Rank	Player	Club	Goals
1	(Paraguay) Óscar Cardozo	Benfica	20
1	(Brazil) Lima	Braga	20
3	(Brazil) Hulk	Porto	16
4	(Netherlands) Ricky van Wolfswinkel	Sporting CP	14
5	(Colombia) James Rodríguez	Porto	13
6	(Portugal) João Tomás	Rio Ave	11
6	(Brazil) Edgar	Vitória de Guimarães	11
6	(Spain) Nolito	Benfica	11
9	(Senegal) Baba Diawara^{1}	Marítimo	10
9	(Brazil) Claudemir	Nacional	10
9	(Brazil) Bruno César	Benfica	10
9	(Paraguay) Lorenzo Melgarejo	Paços de Ferreira	10
9	(Venezuela) Mario Rondón	Nacional	10

- Last updated: 13 May 2012, 00:25 UTC

=== Assists table ===
Rank	Player	Club	Assists
1	(Brazil) Hulk	Porto	10
2	(Argentina) Pablo Aimar	Benfica	9
2	(Brazil) Danilo Dias	Marítimo	9
4	(Colombia) James Rodríguez	Porto	8
5	(Argentina) Nicolás Gaitán	Benfica	7
5	(Spain) Nolito	Benfica	7
5	(Brazil) Alan	Braga	7
5	(Portugal) Wilson Eduardo	Olhanense	7
5	(Brazil) Lima	Braga	7

- Last updated: 7 May 2012, 12:48 UTC

=== Hat-tricks ===
Player	For	Against	Result	Date
(Brazil) Edgar	Vitória de Guimarães	Paços de Ferreira	5–1	4 November 2011
(Brazil) Lima	Braga	Gil Vicente	3–0	18 February 2012
(Brazil) Kléber	Porto	Rio Ave	5-2	12 May 2012
(Netherlands) Ricky van Wolfswinkel	Sporting CP	Braga	3-2	12 May 2012

== Awards ==
=== Monthly awards ===
==== SJPF Player of the Month ====
Month	Player	Club
September	(Netherlands) Ricky van Wolfswinkel	Sporting CP
October	(Spain) Diego Capel	Sporting CP
November	(Brazil) Toscano	Vitória de Guimarães
December	(France) Bédi Buval	Feirense
January	(Paraguay) Óscar Cardozo	Benfica
February	(Brazil) Lima	Braga
March	(Brazil) Mossoró	Braga
April	(Brazil) Hulk	Porto

==== SJPF Young Player of the Month ====
Month	Player	Club
September	(Portugal) Wilson Eduardo	Olhanense
October	(Portugal) Vítor Gomes	Rio Ave
November	(Portugal) André Pinto	Olhanense
December	(Portugal) Adrien Silva	Académica
January	(Portugal) Daniel Candeias	Nacional
February	(Portugal) Daniel Candeias	Nacional
March	(Portugal) Salvador Agra	Olhanense
April	(Portugal) Daniel Candeias	Nacional

=== Annual awards ===
==== Portuguese Golden Ball ====
The Portuguese Golden Ball was given to James Rodríguez, the youngest player (21) to ever receive the award.

==== LPFP Primeira Liga Player of the Year ====
The LPFP Primeira Liga Player of the Year was awarded to Hulk. He became the first player to win the award twice.

==== LPFP Primeira Liga Breakthrough Player of the Year ====
The LPFP Primeira Liga Breakthrough Player of the Year was awarded to James Rodríguez.

==== LPFP Primeira Liga Goalkeeper of the Year ====
The LPFP Primeira Liga Goalkeeper of the Year was awarded to Rui Patrício.

==== LPFP Primeira Liga Manager of the Year ====
The LPFP Primeira Liga Coach of the Year was awarded to Vítor Pereira.

==== LPFP Primeira Liga Fairplay Award ====
The LPFP Primeira Liga Fairplay Award was awarded to Rio Ave.

== Attendances ==
#	Club	Average	Highest
1	Benfica	42,464	63,146
2	Porto	35,177	50,212
3	Sporting	34,490	48,855
4	Braga	15,169	25,791
5	Vitória SC	12,078	19,830
6	Académica	5,491	14,011
7	Gil Vicente	5,046	12,008
8	Beira-Mar	4,335	17,845
9	Marítimo	3,827	4,403
10	Vitória FC	3,194	5,590
11	Feirense	3,138	14,848
12	Rio Ave	2,700	5,454
13	Olhanense	2,225	4,842
14	União de Leiria	2,168	8,378
15	CD Nacional	1,998	3,575
16	Paços de Ferreira	1,811	4,528

== Notes ==
- ^1 Baba moved to Sevilla during the winter transfer window.
