= Beto (footballer, born 1982) =

Portuguese footballer (born 1982)

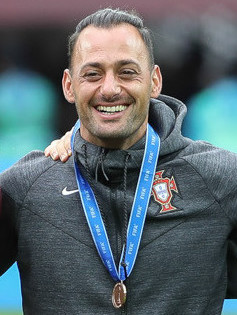
- Beto with Portugal in 2017

Personal information
- Full name: António Alberto Bastos Pimparel
- Date of birth: 1 May 1982 (age 44)
- Place of birth: Loures, Portugal
- Height: 1.82 m (6 ft 0 in)
- Position: Goalkeeper

Youth career
- 1992–1995: Ponte Frielas
- 1995–2000: Sporting CP

Senior career*
Years	Team	Apps	(Gls)
2000–2004	Sporting CP B	62	(0)
2002–2004	Sporting CP	0	(0)
2002–2003	→ Casa Pia (loan)	38	(0)
2004–2005	Chaves	0	(0)
2005–2006	Marco	27	(0)
2006–2009	Leixões	84	(0)
2009–2012	Porto	12	(0)
2011–2012	→ CFR Cluj (loan)	27	(0)
2012–2013	Braga	15	(0)
2013	→ Sevilla (loan)	14	(0)
2013–2016	Sevilla	55	(0)
2016–2017	Sporting CP	3	(0)
2017–2020	Göztepe	93	(0)
2020–2021	Leixões	13	(0)
2021	Farense	11	(0)
2022	HIFK	12	(0)
Total		466	(0)

International career
1998	Portugal U15	5	(0)
1999	Portugal U16	3	(0)
2000	Portugal U17	2	(0)
1999–2001	Portugal U18	2	(0)
2001	Portugal U20	2	(0)
2002–2004	Portugal U21	3	(0)
2004	Portugal B	1	(0)
2009–2018	Portugal	16	(0)
Medal record
Men's football
Representing Portugal
UEFA Nations League
Winner	2019 Portugal
FIFA Confederations Cup
Third place	2017 Russia
UEFA European Championship
Bronze medal – third place	2012 Poland-Ukraine
- * Club domestic league appearances and goals

António Alberto Bastos Pimparel (born 1 May 1982), known as Beto, is a Portuguese former professional footballer who played as a goalkeeper.

He made a name for himself at Leixões before transferring to Porto in 2009, being a backup during his spell. After one season in Romania with CFR Cluj he joined Sevilla in January 2013, going on appear in 89 competitive matches and win two Europa League trophies. He also spent three years in the Turkish Süper Lig with Göztepe, having signed in 2017.

Beto earned 16 caps for Portugal, being part of the squads in three World Cups and Euro 2012.

== Club career ==
=== Sporting CP and Leixões ===
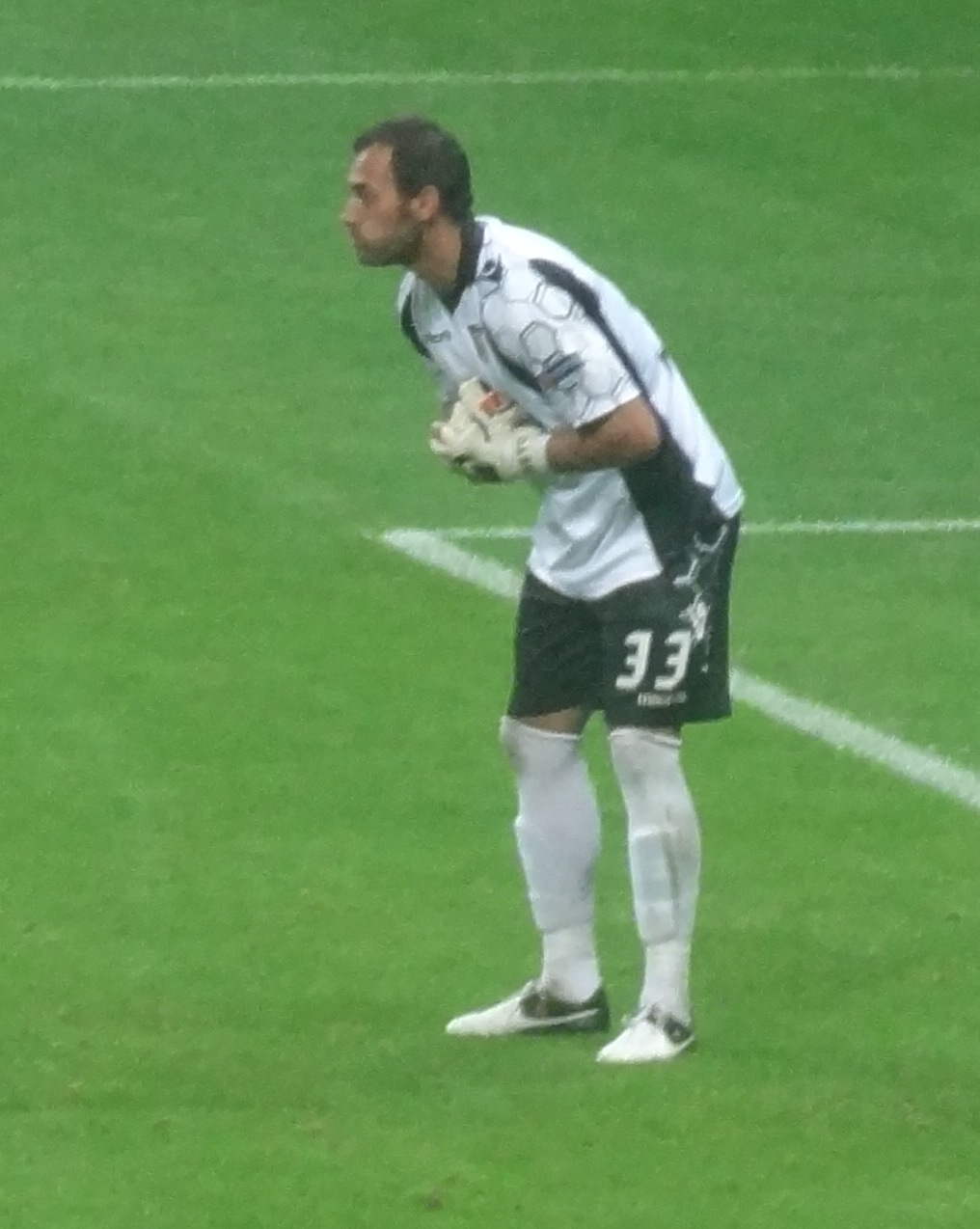
Beto in action for Braga in 2012

Beto was born in Loures, Grande Lisboa. After unsuccessfully developing in local Sporting CP's youth system, he played one season on loan to neighbours Casa Pia AC, being released in June 2004.

After one year each with G.D. Chaves and F.C. Marco, both in the second division, Beto joined Leixões S.C. for the 2006–07 campaign, helping the Matosinhos club return to the Primeira Liga and only missing a total of seven matches in his three seasons.

=== Porto ===
In March 2009, before 2008–09 ended, Beto agreed to a move to FC Porto, in a four-year deal worth €750.000 effective as of June. During his two-season spell he acted almost exclusively as backup to Brazilian Helton, being mostly restricted to Taça de Portugal appearances; on 22 May 2011, with the score at 2–2, he saved a penalty kick in the domestic cup final, with his team eventually winning 6–2 in the Portuguese capital.

=== Braga and Sevilla ===
For 2011–12, Beto was loaned to Romanian side CFR Cluj, only missing seven Liga I games during the season for the eventual champions. Released by Porto he returned to his country in the following summer, signing for two years with S.C. Braga; however, late into the following transfer window, he moved to Sevilla FC as the Spaniards were looking to strengthen the position following the departure of Diego López to Real Madrid – the loan was arranged until June, with the possibility of a permanent transfer afterwards.

Profiting from injury to Andrés Palop, Beto made his debut with the Andalusians one day after arriving, starting in a 2–1 away loss against Atlético Madrid in the first leg of the semi-finals of the Copa del Rey, with his team playing the last eight minutes with only nine players. His first La Liga match came on 3 February 2013, in a 2–1 home win over Rayo Vallecano.

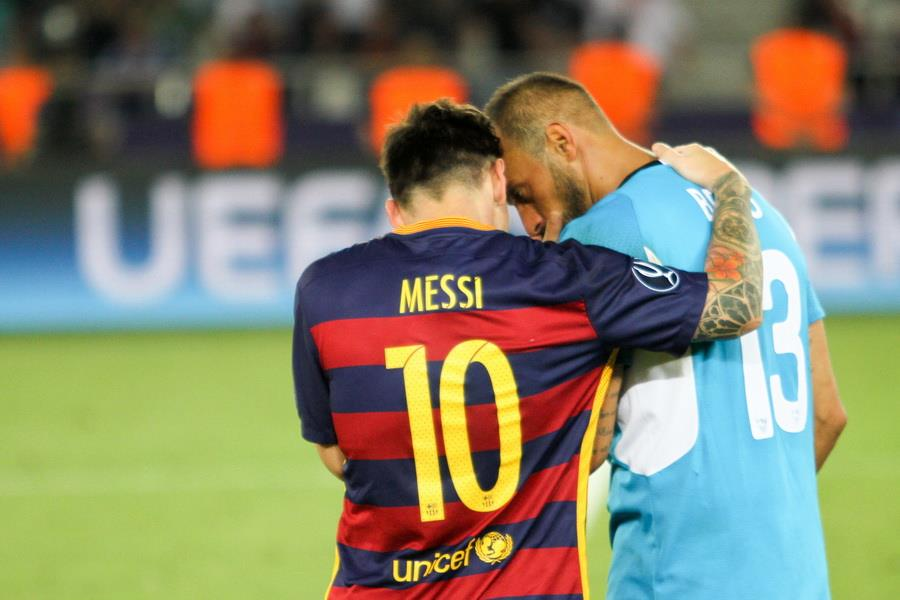
Beto being consoled by Lionel Messi after the UEFA Super Cup loss to Barcelona

Beto was subsequently signed on a permanent basis, being first choice for head coach Unai Emery. He contributed 43 appearances in all competitions in the 2013–14 campaign, including ten in the team's victorious run in the UEFA Europa League, where he saved two penalties from Óscar Cardozo and Rodrigo in the final's shootout against S.L. Benfica.

Beto spent several months of 2014–15 on the sidelines, due to injury: first, a shoulder dislocation after a collision with Real Madrid's Karim Benzema, followed by an ailment to his left leg. After finishing the season as backup to Sergio Rico, he was reinstated by Emery for the 2015 UEFA Super Cup, performing well overall but conceding five goals in the 5–4 loss to FC Barcelona.

Following the emergence of David Soria also from the club's youth system, Beto was demoted to third-choice.

=== Return to Sporting ===
On 6 August 2016, free agent Beto signed a two-year contract with former team Sporting. He made his debut in competitive games for his first club on 13 October 2016, at the age of 34 years and five months, keeping a clean sheet in a 1–0 away win against F.C. Famalicão in the Portuguese Cup; he dedicated the performance to his late father.

=== Göztepe ===
On 29 July 2017, shortly after having expressed a desire to leave Sporting in order to have a better chance of 2018 FIFA World Cup selection, Beto joined Göztepe S.K. from Turkey for an undisclosed fee. After 95 official games, he left at the end of his contract in August 2020.

=== Later career ===
Beto returned to Leixões on 21 September 2020. He terminated his contract the following 15 March at his own request, returning to the top tier the next day on a short-term deal at S.C. Farense to cover for seriously injured Rafael Defendi.

In February 2022, aged 39, Beto joined Veikkausliiga side HIFK Fotboll on a one-year contract. He won three consecutive penalty shootouts in the Finnish Cup, helping them to reach the semi-finals. On 4 July, he was sent off in added time of a 1–0 home defeat against Ilves for fighting with Kalle Katz, and later that month he was released by mutual consent.

== International career ==
Beto made his debut for Portugal on 10 June 2009, in a 0–0 friendly match in Estonia. After finishing 2009–10 in Porto's starting 11, he was named by manager Carlos Queiroz in a provisional 24-player list for the 2010 FIFA World Cup, making the final cut for the finals in South Africa where he did not leave the substitutes' bench. He was also an unused part of the squad at UEFA Euro 2012.

Beto was also selected four years later for the tournament in Brazil, making his debut in the competition on 22 June against the United States in the second group stage match, after starter Rui Patrício was injured in the first encounter against Germany. He was named in the provisional 24-man squad for the 2017 FIFA Confederations Cup, being also picked for the following year's World Cup.

On 14 October 2018, the 36-year-old Beto captained Portugal for the first time in a 3–1 friendly win away to Scotland.

== Career statistics ==
=== Club ===
Appearances and goals by club, season and competition
Club	Season	League			National cup (Note: Includes Taça de Portugal, Copa del Rey, Turkish Cup and Suomen Cup)		League cup (Note: Includes Taça da Liga and Finnish League Cup)		Continental		Other		Total	
Club	Season	Division	Apps	Goals	Apps	Goals	Apps	Goals	Apps	Goals	Apps	Goals	Apps	Goals
Sporting CP	2001–02	Primeira Liga	0	0	1	0	—		0	0	—		1	0
Casa Pia (loan)	2002–03	Segunda Divisão	38	0	1	0	—		—		—		39	0
Chaves	2004–05	Segunda Liga	0	0	2	0	—		—		—		2	0
Marco	2005–06	Segunda Liga	27	0	0	0	—		—		—		27	0
Leixões	2006–07	Segunda Liga	28	0	3	0	—		—		—		31	0
Leixões	2007–08	Primeira Liga	26	0	3	0	1	0	—		—		30	0
Leixões	2008–09	Primeira Liga	30	0	4	0	0	0	—		—		34	0
Leixões	Total		84	0	10	0	1	0	—		—		95	0
Porto	2009–10	Primeira Liga	6	0	6	0	0	0	1 (Note: Appearances in UEFA Champions League)	0	—		13	0
Porto	2010–11	Primeira Liga	6	0	4	0	1	0	1 (Note: Appearances in UEFA Europa League)	0	0	0	12	0
Porto	Total		12	0	10	0	1	0	2	0	0	0	25	0
CFR Cluj (loan)	2011–12	Liga I	27	0	0	0	—		—		—		27	0
Braga	2012–13	Primeira Liga	15	0	0	0	0	0	7	0	—		22	0
Sevilla (loan)	2012–13	La Liga	14	0	2	0	—		—		—		16	0
Sevilla	2013–14	La Liga	33	0	0	0	—		10	0	—		43	0
Sevilla	2014–15	La Liga	18	0	1	0	—		5	0	1 (Note: Appearance in UEFA Super Cup)	0	25	0
Sevilla	2015–16	La Liga	4	0	0	0	—		0	0	1	0	5	0
Sevilla	Total		69	0	3	0	—		15	0	2	0	89	0
Sporting CP	2016–17	Primeira Liga	3	0	3	0	3	0	0	0	—		9	0
Göztepe	2017–18	Süper Lig	30	0	0	0	—		—		—		30	0
Göztepe	2018–19	Süper Lig	33	0	2	0	—		—		—		35	0
Göztepe	2019–20	Süper Lig	30	0	0	0	—		—		—		30	0
Göztepe	Total		93	0	2	0	—		—		—		95	0
Leixões	2020–21	Liga Portugal 2	13	0	0	0	0	0	—		—		13	0
Farense	2020–21	Primeira Liga	11	0	0	0	0	0	—		—		11	0
HIFK	2022	Veikkausliiga	12	0	3	0	1	0	—		—		16	0
Career total			404	0	35	0	6	0	24	0	2	0	471	0

=== International ===
Appearances and goals by national team and year
National team	Year	Apps	Goals
Portugal	2009	1	0
Portugal	2010	0	0
Portugal	2011	0	0
Portugal	2012	3	0
Portugal	2013	1	0
Portugal	2014	5	0
Portugal	2015	1	0
Portugal	2016	0	0
Portugal	2017	1	0
Portugal	2018	4	0
Total		16	0

== Honours ==
Sporting CP

- Taça de Portugal: 2001–02

Leixões

- Segunda Liga: 2006–07

Porto

- Primeira Liga: 2010–11
- Taça de Portugal: 2009–10, 2010–11
- Supertaça Cândido de Oliveira: 2010
- UEFA Europa League: 2010–11

CFR Cluj

- Liga I: 2011–12

Sevilla

- UEFA Europa League: 2013–14, 2014–15

Portugal B

- Torneio Vale do Tejo: 2004

Portugal

- UEFA Nations League: 2018–19
- FIFA Confederations Cup third place: 2017
