= 2009–10 Primeira Liga =

76th season of top-tier Portuguese football

Primeira Liga
- Season: 2009–10
- Dates: 14 August 2009 – 9 May 2010
- Champions: Benfica; 32nd title
- Relegated: Leixões; Belenenses
- Champions League: Benfica; Braga
- Europa League: Porto; Sporting CP; Marítimo
- Matches: 240
- Goals: 601 (2.5 per match)
- Best player: David Luiz
- Top goalscorer: Óscar Cardozo (26 goals)
- Biggest home win: Benfica 8–1 V. Setúbal (31 August 2009)
- Biggest away win: Marítimo 0–5 Benfica (17 January 2010)
- Highest scoring: Benfica 8–1 V. Setúbal (31 August 2009) (9 goals)
- Longest winning run: Benfica 9 games (13 February 2010 – 24 April 2010)
- Longest unbeaten run: Benfica 19 games (1 November 2009 – 24 April 2010)
- Longest losing run: Belenenses 7 games (17 January 2010 – 7 March 2010)
- Highest attendance: Benfica 2–1 Rio Ave (64,103) (9 May 2010)
- Lowest attendance: Naval 1–0 Leiria (397) (12 March 2010)
- Average attendance: 10,901

The 2009–10 Primeira Liga (also known as the Liga Sagres for sponsorship reasons) was the 76th season of the Primeira Liga, the top professional league for Portuguese association football clubs. It began on 16 August 2009 and ended on 9 May 2010.

Benfica won their 32nd league title after a 2–1 home victory over Rio Ave on the last matchday. Benfica striker Óscar Cardozo was the top scorer with 26 goals.

== Changes from 2008–09 ==
=== Team changes ===
Trofense have been relegated to the Liga de Honra after finishing the 2008–09 season in 16th and last place. Trofense were to be accompanied by Belenenses, who finished in 15th place. Belenenses were ending a ten-year stretch in the Portuguese top-level league, while Trofense returned to the Liga da Honra after just one year in the top flight.

Estrela da Amadora, however, who finished last season in 11th place, have been relegated for economic problems to the Liga Vitalis. Therefore, Belenenses' relegation has been reversed and they will participate in the Liga Sagres once more.

The relegated teams were replaced by Liga Vitalis 2008–09 champions Olhanense and runners-up União de Leiria. Olhanense returned to the top-flight after 34 years, while Leiria was back after a one-year hiatus.

=== Structural changes ===
Based on UEFA coefficients, Portugal finished in tenth place of the UEFA country ranking after the 2008–09 season. As a result, the Portuguese league will lose one qualification spot for the 2010–11 UEFA Europa League. The third-placed team will now qualify for the third qualification round instead of the play-off round. The fourth-placed team will enter the competition in the second qualification round while the fifth place will not initially qualify for any European competitions via league placement. However, this may change during the course of the season depending on the league performance of both 2009–10 Cup of Portugal finalists.

== Team overview ==
Location of teams in Liga Sagres 2009–10
Location of teams in Liga Sagres 2009–10

=== Stadia and locations ===
Club	City	Stadium	Capacity	2008 Season
Académica	Coimbra	Estádio Cidade de Coimbra	30,210	7th in Liga Sagres
Belenenses	Lisbon	Estádio do Restelo	32,500	15th in Liga Sagres
Benfica	Lisbon	Estádio da Luz	65,400	3rd in Liga Sagres
Braga	Braga	Estádio Municipal de Braga	30,152	5th in Liga Sagres
Leixões	Matosinhos	Estádio do Mar	16,035	6th in Liga Sagres
Marítimo	Funchal	Estádio dos Barreiros	8,922	9th in Liga Sagres
Nacional	Funchal	Estádio da Madeira	5,132	4th in Liga Sagres
Naval 1º de Maio	Figueira da Foz	Estádio Municipal José Bento Pessoa	12,630	13th in Liga Sagres
Olhanense	Olhão	Estádio José Arcanjo	10,000	Liga Vitalis champion
Paços de Ferreira	Paços de Ferreira	Estádio da Mata Real	5,255	10th in Liga Sagres
Porto	Porto	Estádio do Dragão	50,399	Liga Sagres champion
Rio Ave	Vila do Conde	Estádio dos Arcos	12,815	12th in Liga Sagres
Sporting CP	Lisbon	Estádio José Alvalade	50,080	2nd in Liga Sagres
União de Leiria	Leiria	Estádio Dr. Magalhães Pessoa	30,000	Liga Vitalis runner-up
Vitória de Guimarães	Guimarães	Estádio D. Afonso Henriques	30,165	8th in Liga Sagres
Vitória de Setúbal	Setúbal	Estádio do Bonfim	25,000	14th in Liga Sagres

=== Personnel and sponsoring ===
Team	Captain	Head Coach	Kitmaker	Shirt sponsor
Académica	(Cape Verde) Lito	(Portugal) André Villas-Boas	Lacatoni	Dolce Vita
Belenenses	(Portugal) José Pedro	(Portugal) Toni Conceição	Lacatoni	n/a
Benfica	(Portugal) Nuno Gomes	(Portugal) Jorge Jesus	Adidas	Front: TMN (home) / MEO (away) | Back: Sagres
Braga	(Brazil) Vandinho	(Portugal) Domingos Paciência	Macron	AXA
Leixões	(Portugal) Zé Manel	(Spain) Fernando Castro Santos	Sport Zone	Cepsa
Marítimo	(Portugal) Bruno	(Netherlands) Mitchell van der Gaag	Lacatoni	BANIF
Nacional	(Portugal) Bruno Patacas	(Portugal) Manuel Machado	Legea	BANIF
Naval 1º de Maio	(Portugal) Carlitos	(Portugal) Augusto Inácio	Desportreino	Motéis Algarve Sol
Olhanense	(Cape Verde) Toy	(Portugal) Jorge Costa	Sport Zone	n/a
Paços de Ferreira	(Portugal) Paulo Sousa	(Portugal) Ulisses Morais	Diadora	Capital do Móveis: Paços de Ferreira
Porto	(Portugal) Bruno Alves	(Portugal) Jesualdo Ferreira	Nike	Front: TMN (home) / MEO (away) | Back: Super Bock
Rio Ave	(Portugal) José Gaspar	(Portugal) Carlos Brito	Lacatoni	Nassica: Vila do Conde
Sporting CP	(Portugal) João Moutinho	(Portugal) Carlos Carvalhal	Puma	Front: TMN (home) / MEO (away) | Back Super Bock
União de Leiria	(Cape Verde) Marco Soares	(Angola) Lito Vidigal	Legea	n/a
Vitória de Guimarães	(Portugal) Flávio Meireles	(Portugal) Paulo Sérgio	Lacatoni	Finibanco
Vitória de Setúbal	(Cape Verde) Sandro	(Portugal) Manuel Fernandes	Lacatoni	n/a

=== Managerial changes ===
Team	Outgoing	Manner	Date	Table	Incoming	Date
Naval 1º de Maio	(Portugal) Ulisses Morais	Sacked	7 September 2009	15th	(Portugal) Augusto Inácio	12 September 2009
Vitória de Setúbal	(Portugal) Carlos Azenha	Resigned	14 September 2009	16th	(Portugal) Quim^{1}	17 September 2009
Marítimo	(Portugal) Carlos Carvalhal	Resigned	28 September 2009	11th	(Netherlands) Mitchell van der Gaag	28 September 2009
Académica	(Portugal) Rogério Gonçalves	Resigned	3 October 2009	16th	(Portugal) Zé Nando^{1}	4 October 2009
Vitória de Guimarães	(Portugal) Nelo Vingada	Resigned	7 October 2009	12th	(Portugal) Basílio Marques^{1}	8 October 2009
Académica	(Portugal) Zé Nando	Replaced	13 October 2009	16th	(Portugal) André Villas-Boas	13 October 2009
Vitória de Guimarães	(Portugal) Basílio Marques	Replaced	13 October 2009	12th	(Portugal) Paulo Sérgio	13 October 2009
Paços de Ferreira	(Portugal) Paulo Sérgio	Left to sign with Vitória de Guimarães	16 October 2009	10th	(Portugal) Ulisses Morais	16 October 2009
União de Leiria	(Portugal) Manuel Fernandes	Left to sign with Vitória de Setúbal	19 October 2009	9th	(Angola) Lito Vidigal	21 October 2009
Vitória de Setúbal	(Portugal) Quim	Replaced	21 October 2009	15th	(Portugal) Manuel Fernandes	21 October 2009
Sporting CP	(Portugal) Paulo Bento	Resigned	6 November 2009	7th	(Portugal) Leonel Pontes^{1}	6 November 2009
Sporting CP	(Portugal) Leonel Pontes	Replaced	15 November 2009	8th	(Portugal) Carlos Carvalhal	15 November 2009
Nacional	(Portugal) Manuel Machado	Health issues	30 November 2009	4th	(Portugal) José Augusto^{1}	30 November 2009
Nacional	(Portugal) José Augusto	Replaced	13 December 2009	4th	(Serbia) Predrag Jokanović^{1}	13 December 2009
Belenenses	(Portugal) João Carlos Pereira	Resigned	21 December 2009	16th	(Portugal) Toni Conceição	23 December 2009
Nacional	(Serbia) Predrag Jokanović	Replaced	26 January 2010	5th	(Portugal) Manuel Machado	26 January 2010
Leixões	(Portugal) José Mota	Resigned	9 February 2010	15th	(Spain) Fernando Castro Santos	9 February 2010

^{1} Interim coach

== League table ==
Pos	Team	Pld	W	D	L	GF	GA	GD	Pts	Qualification or relegation
1	Benfica (C)	30	24	4	2	78	20	+58	76	Qualification to Champions League group stage
2	Braga	30	22	5	3	48	20	+28	71	Qualification to Champions League third qualifying round
3	Porto	30	21	5	4	70	26	+44	68	Qualification to Europa League play-off round (Note: Porto qualified for the play-off round of 2010–11 UEFA Europa League after winning the 2009–10 Taça de Portugal.)
4	Sporting CP	30	13	9	8	42	26	+16	48	Qualification to Europa League third qualifying round
5	Marítimo	30	11	8	11	42	43	−1	41 (Note: Marítimo ahead of Vitória de Guimarães on head-to-head record; Vitória de Guimarães–Marítimo 1–2, Marítimo–Vitória de Guimarães 0–1.)	Qualification to Europa League second qualifying round
6	Vitória de Guimarães	30	11	8	11	31	34	−3	41	
7	Nacional	30	10	9	11	36	46	−10	39	
8	Naval 1º de Maio	30	10	6	14	20	35	−15	36	
9	União de Leiria	30	9	8	13	35	41	−6	35 (Note: União de Leiria ahead of Paços de Ferreira on head-to-head record; Paços de Ferreira–União de Leiria 0–1, União de Leiria–Paços de Ferreira 2–1.)	
10	Paços de Ferreira	30	8	11	11	32	37	−5	35	
11	Académica	30	8	9	13	37	42	−5	33	
12	Rio Ave	30	6	13	11	22	33	−11	31	
13	Olhanense	30	5	14	11	31	46	−15	29	
14	Vitória de Setúbal	30	5	10	15	29	57	−28	25	
15	Belenenses (R)	30	4	11	15	23	44	−21	23	Relegation to Liga de Honra
16	Leixões (R)	30	5	6	19	25	51	−26	21	Relegation to Liga de Honra

Source: LPFP
Rules for classification: 1) points; 2) head-to-head points; 3) head-to-head goal difference; 4) head-to-head goals scored; 5) goal difference; 6) number of goals scored.
(C) Champions; (R) Relegated

=== Positions by round ===
Team ╲ Round	1	2	3	4	5	6	7	8	9	10	11	12	13	14	15	16	17	18	19	20	21	22	23	24	25	26	27	28	29	30
Académica	16	14	14	14	15	16	16	16	16	16	12	13	12	12	10	11	12	11	11	11	12	12	12	12	12	12	12	12	12	11
Belenenses	11	5	7	10	11	12	14	11	10	14	13	12	13	16	15	16	16	16	16	16	16	16	16	16	16	16	16	16	16	15
Benfica	9	3	2	2	2	2	2	1	2	2	2	2	2	2	2	2	2	2	2	1	1	1	1	1	1	1	1	1	1	1
Braga	1	1	1	1	1	1	1	2	1	1	1	1	1	1	1	1	1	1	1	2	2	2	2	2	2	2	2	2	2	2
Leixões	14	15	12	12	8	13	8	9	11	15	14	14	14	14	16	14	15	15	15	15	15	15	15	15	15	15	15	15	15	16
Marítimo	3	2	4	9	10	11	7	7	8	5	5	5	6	9	9	9	8	6	7	7	10	10	11	8	9	9	7	7	7	5
Nacional	6	13	13	13	9	6	5	6	5	4	4	4	4	4	5	5	6	7	6	8	7	8	9	10	8	8	6	6	6	7
Naval 1º de Maio	10	16	15	15	16	15	11	15	9	11	11	9	10	10	11	12	11	12	12	12	11	11	8	9	10	10	9	10	8	8
Olhanense	12	8	9	7	7	10	13	14	15	13	15	15	15	15	14	13	14	13	13	13	13	13	13	13	14	14	14	14	13	13
Paços de Ferreira	8	9	10	11	13	8	9	12	12	10	10	11	11	11	12	10	10	10	10	9	6	7	6	7	7	7	10	9	10	10
Porto	5	4	3	3	3	3	3	3	3	3	3	3	3	3	3	3	3	3	3	3	3	3	3	3	3	3	3	3	3	3
Rio Ave	4	6	5	4	5	4	6	5	4	6	7	7	5	8	8	8	9	9	9	10	9	9	10	11	11	11	11	11	11	12
Sporting CP	2	10	6	5	4	5	4	4	7	8	6	6	7	5	4	4	4	4	4	4	4	4	4	4	4	4	4	4	4	4
União de Leiria	7	7	8	6	6	7	9	8	6	7	8	8	8	6	7	6	5	5	5	5	8	6	7	6	6	6	8	8	9	9
Vitória de Guimarães	13	12	11	8	12	9	12	10	13	9	9	10	9	7	6	7	7	8	8	6	5	5	5	5	5	5	5	5	5	6
Vitória de Setúbal	15	11	16	16	14	14	15	13	14	12	16	16	16	13	13	15	13	14	14	14	14	14	14	14	13	13	13	13	14	14

Leader
2nd place
3rd place

== Results ==
Home \ Away	ACA	BEL	BEN	BRA	LEI	MAR	NAC	NAV	OLH	PAÇ	POR	RAV	SCP	ULE	VGU	VSE
Académica		1–1	2–3	0–2	2–0	2–4	3–3	2–0	1–1	1–1	1–2	0–1	0–2	0–0	2–0	3–0
Belenenses	1–2		0–4	1–3	1–3	2–2	0–1	2–0	0–0	0–3	0–3	0–0	0–4	5–2	0–1	0–0
Benfica	4–0	1–0		1–0	5–0	1–1	6–1	1–0	5–0	3–1	1–0	2–1	2–0	3–0	3–1	8–1
Braga	1–0	3–1	2–0		3–1	2–1	2–0	0–0	3–1	1–0	1–0	1–0	1–0	2–0	3–2	2–0
Leixões	1–3	0–0	0–4	1–1		1–2	2–4	1–0	2–2	2–0	0–0	0–0	1–2	3–2	3–1	1–2
Marítimo	0–0	3–3	0–5	1–2	1–0		1–1	1–2	5–2	3–1	1–0	0–1	3–2	1–0	0–1	2–0
Nacional	4–3	1–0	0–1	1–1	1–0	2–1		1–1	1–1	1–1	0–4	1–1	1–1	2–0	2–0	2–1
Naval 1º de Maio	0–1	1–0	2–4	0–4	1–0	2–1	0–0		0–0	1–0	1–3	3–2	0–1	1–0	0–0	0–1
Olhanense	2–1	1–3	2–2	0–1	1–0	1–2	1–0	1–0		1–1	0–3	0–1	0–0	0–0	0–2	2–2
Paços de Ferreira	2–1	0–0	1–3	0–1	1–1	1–0	2–1	1–3	2–2		1–1	1–1	0–0	0–1	0–0	5–3
Porto	3–2	1–1	3–1	5–1	4–1	4–1	3–0	3–0	2–2	1–1		2–1	1–0	3–2	3–0	2–0
Rio Ave	0–0	0–0	0–1	1–1	2–0	0–0	2–0	0–0	1–5	1–2	0–1		2–2	0–2	0–0	1–0
Sporting CP	1–2	0–0	0–0	1–2	1–0	1–1	3–2	0–1	3–2	1–0	3–0	5–0		0–1	3–1	2–1
União de Leiria	1–1	1–0	1–2	1–2	2–1	0–0	1–2	2–0	2–0	2–1	1–4	1–1	1–1		0–1	3–3
Vitória de Guimarães	1–0	2–0	0–1	1–0	2–0	1–2	2–0	3–0	1–1	1–2	1–4	1–0	1–1	2–2		2–2
Vitória de Setúbal	1–1	1–2	1–1	0–0	1–0	3–2	2–1	0–1	0–0	0–1	2–5	2–2	0–2	0–4	0–0	

Source: Liga Sagres (Liga Portugal) (in Portuguese)
Legend: Blue = home team win; Yellow = draw; Red = away team win.

== Season statistics ==
=== Top goalscorers ===
Position	Player	Club	Goals
1	(Paraguay) Óscar Cardozo	Benfica	26
2	(Colombia) Radamel Falcao	Porto	25
3	(Portugal) Liédson	Sporting CP	13
4	(Brazil) Edgar	Nacional	12
4	(Brazil) Cássio	União de Leiria	12
4	(Brazil) Djalmir	Olhanense	12
4	(Cameroon) Albert Meyong	Braga	12
8	(Argentina) Javier Saviola	Benfica	11
9	(Brazil) William	Paços de Ferreira	10
9	(Senegal) Ladji Keita	Vitória de Setúbal	10

Source: Liga Sagres – Top Goalscorers (Portuguese)

== Awards ==
=== Monthly awards ===
==== SJPF Player of the Month ====
Month	Player	Club
September	Alan	Braga
October	Djalma	Marítimo
November	João Tomás	Rio Ave
December	Javier Saviola	Benfica
January	Mossoró	Braga
February	Júlio Coelho	Paços de Ferreira
March	Liédson	Sporting CP
April	Ángel Di María	Benfica

==== SJPF Young Player of the Month ====
Month	Player	Club
September	André Castro	Olhanense
October	Fábio Coentrão	Benfica
November	Fábio Faria	Rio Ave
December	Fábio Faria	Rio Ave
January	André Castro	Olhanense
February	André Castro	Olhanense
March	Fábio Coentrão	Benfica
April	Fábio Coentrão	Benfica

==== SJPF Fair Play Award ====
Month	Club
September	Académica
October	Braga
November	Naval
December	Marítimo
January	Braga
February	Benfica
March	Paços de Ferreira
April	Nacional

=== Annual awards ===
==== LPFP Primeira Liga Player of the Year ====
The LPFP Primeira Liga Player of the Year was awarded to David Luiz of Benfica.

==== LPFP Primeira Liga Breakthrough Player of the Year ====
The LPFP Primeira Liga Breakthrough Player of the Year was awarded to Fábio Coentrão of Benfica.

==== LPFP Primeira Liga Manager of the Year ====
The LPFP Primeira Liga Manager of the Year was awarded to Jorge Jesus of Benfica.

==== LPFP Primeira Liga Breakthrough Manager of the Year ====
The LPFP Primeira Liga Breakthrough Manager of the Year was awarded to André Villas-Boas of Académica.

== Attendances ==
#	Club	Average	Highest
1	Benfica	50,033	64,103
2	Porto	33,464	46,511
3	Sporting	24,606	45,880
4	Vitória SC	15,884	27,310
5	Braga	14,274	30,186
6	Académica	4,960	21,742
7	Vitória FC	4,407	11,042
8	Olhanense	4,363	8,206
9	Leixões	3,644	6,474
10	Marítimo	3,490	5,000
11	União de Leiria	3,481	22,676
12	Os Belenenses	3,377	17,473
13	Rio Ave	2,593	7,060
14	Naval	2,092	8,068
15	CD Nacional	2,092	4,646
16	Paços de Ferreira	1,659	4,865

== See also ==
- 2009–10 Liga de Honra
- 2009–10 Taça de Portugal
- 2009–10 Taça da Liga
- List of 2009–10 Portuguese Liga transfers
