= Orlando Neto =

Portuguese footballer

Orlando
Personal information
- Full name: Rui Orlando Ribeiro Santos Neto
- Date of birth: 24 October 1979 (age 47)
- Place of birth: Santo Tirso, Portugal
- Height: 1.83 m (6 ft 0 in)
- Position: Centre-back

Youth career
- 1991–1994: 1º Maio Figueiró
- 1994–1998: Vitória Guimarães

Senior career*
Years	Team	Apps	(Gls)
1998–2001	Fafe	57	(0)
2001–2006	Moreirense	83	(6)
2006–2007	Freamunde	22	(3)
2007–2012	Académica	90	(3)
2013	Freamunde	14	(1)
2013–2014	Felgueiras 1932	30	(2)
2014–2015	Leixões	37	(0)
2015–2017	São Martinho	53	(5)
Total		386	(20)
- * Club domestic league appearances and goals

Rui Orlando Ribeiro Santos Neto (born 24 October 1979), known as Orlando, is a Portuguese former footballer who played as a central defender.

He appeared in at least 100 matches in each of the three major levels of Portuguese football in a 19-year professional career, including 124 in the Primeira Liga (where he represented Moreirense and Académica and scored five goals).

== Club career ==
Born in Santo Tirso, Porto District, Orlando started his career with AD Fafe in the third division in 1998, moving on to Moreirense FC after three years. Under the guidance of Manuel Machado, he was an important defensive member of a side that was promoted to the Primeira Liga – the season prior to the player's arrival, the club was also in the third tier.

In 2006, Orlando returned to division three with S.C. Freamunde. After a good season, he was signed by Académica de Coimbra, being an undisputed starter from his debut onwards. In 2008–09 he scored in both matches against F.C. Paços de Ferreira (2–1 win at home, 1–1 away), and continued to be first-choice in the following top-flight campaigns, also being named captain.

Orlando spent the better part of 2010–11 and 2011–12 on the sidelines, nursing an injury. In the first game upon his return, on 15 January 2012, he had to be stretchered off in the early minutes of the home fixture against Vitória de Guimarães, in an eventual 0–2 loss; after surgery, he remained inactive for nearly one year.

In the summer of 2012, after five seasons with the Briosa, Orlando parted ways with the club. In January of the following year he agreed on a return to Freamunde, who now competed now in the Segunda Liga.

Following Freamunde's relegation, Orlando signed for FC Felgueiras on a one-year deal.
