= 2006–07 Primeira Liga =

73rd season of top-tier Portuguese football

Primeira Liga
- Season: 2006–07
- Dates: 25 August 2006 – 20 May 2007
- Champions: Porto (22nd title)
- Relegated: Beira-Mar; Desportivo das Aves
- Champions League: Porto; Sporting CP; Benfica
- UEFA Cup: Braga; Belenenses; Paços de Ferreira
- Matches: 240
- Goals: 554 (2.31 per match)
- Best Player: Simão
- Top goalscorer: Liédson (15 goals)
- Biggest home win: 5–1 (3 times)
- Biggest away win: Beira-Mar 0–5 Porto (25 February 2007)
- Highest scoring: Nacional 3–4 Desportivo das Aves (15 April 2007)

The 2006–07 Primeira Liga (also known as BWINLIGA for sponsorship reasons) was the 73rd edition of top flight of Portuguese football. It started on 27 August 2006 with a match between Vitória de Setúbal and Académica and ended on 20 May 2007. The league was contested by 16 clubs, with Porto as defending champions.

Porto and Sporting CP were both qualified for the 2007–08 UEFA Champions League group stage, while Benfica qualified for the UEFA Champions League qualifying round. Braga, Belenenses and Paços de Ferreira qualified for the 2007–08 UEFA Cup. Beira-Mar and Desportivo das Aves were relegated to the Liga de Honra. Liédson was the top scorer with 15 goals.

== Promotion and relegation ==
=== Teams relegated to Liga de Honra ===
- Penafiel
- Rio Ave
- Vitória de Guimarães
- Gil Vicente

The professional competitions shrunk from 18 to 16 clubs following last season's promotions and relegations' modifications. Penafiel, Rio Ave, Vitória de Guimarães were relegated to the Liga de Honra.

In June 2006, Belenenses, who finished 15th in the previous season, were scheduled to be relegated. However, the Lisbon team presented a complaint to the Portuguese League for Professional Football regarding the use of a non-registered player (Mateus) by 13th-placed Gil Vicente. The penalty pretended by Belenenses would result in Gil Vicente being relegated in their place. This claim generated a series of appeals and controversial statements to the media. The decision has been taken on 23 August and made Belenenses stay in the Portuguese Liga while Gil Vicente were relegated to the Liga de Honra.

=== Teams promoted from Liga de Honra ===
- Beira-Mar
- Desportivo das Aves

Beira-Mar and Desportivo das Aves were promoted to the Liga.

Location of teams in the 2006-07 Liga
Location of teams in the '2006-07 Liga

== Club information ==
Club	Season's Last Head Coach	City	Stadium	2005–06 season
Académica	(Portugal) Nelo Vingada	Coimbra	Estádio Cidade de Coimbra	14th
Beira-Mar	(Spain) Paco Soler	Aveiro	Estádio Municipal de Aveiro	1st in the Liga de Honra
Belenenses	(Portugal) Jorge Jesus	Lisbon	Estádio do Restelo	15th
Benfica	(Portugal) Fernando Santos	Lisbon	Estádio da Luz	3rd
Boavista	(Portugal) Pedro Barny	Porto	Estádio do Bessa – Século XXI	6th
Braga	(Portugal) Jorge Costa	Braga	Estádio Municipal de Braga – AXA	4th
Desportivo das Aves	(Portugal) Professor Neca	Santo Tirso	Estádio do CD das Aves	2nd in the Liga de Honra
Estrela da Amadora	(Portugal) Daúto Faquirá	Amadora	Estádio José Gomes	9th
Marítimo	(Portugal) Ulisses Morais	Funchal	Estádio dos Barreiros	10th
Nacional	(Serbia) Predrag Jokanović	Funchal	Estádio da Madeira	5th
Naval 1° de Maio	(Portugal) Mariano Barreto	Figueira da Foz	Estádio Municipal José Bento Pessoa	13th
Paços de Ferreira	(Portugal) José Mota	Paços de Ferreira	Estádio da Mata Real	11th
Porto	(Portugal) Jesualdo Ferreira	Porto	Estádio do Dragão	1st
Sporting CP	(Portugal) Paulo Bento	Lisbon	Estádio José Alvalade – Século XXI	2nd
União de Leiria	(Portugal) Paulo Duarte	Leiria	Estádio Dr. Magalhães Pessoa	7th
Vitória de Setúbal	(Portugal) Carlos Cardoso	Setúbal	Estádio do Bonfim	8th

== League table ==
Pos	Team	Pld	W	D	L	GF	GA	GD	Pts	Qualification or relegation
1	Porto (C)	30	22	3	5	65	20	+45	69	Qualification to Champions League group stage
2	Sporting CP	30	20	8	2	54	15	+39	68	Qualification to Champions League group stage
3	Benfica	30	20	7	3	55	20	+35	67	Qualification to Champions League third qualifying round
4	Braga	30	14	8	8	35	30	+5	50	Qualification to UEFA Cup first round
5	Belenenses	30	15	4	11	36	29	+7	49	Qualification to UEFA Cup first round
6	Paços de Ferreira	30	10	12	8	31	36	−5	42	Qualification to UEFA Cup first round
7	União de Leiria	30	10	11	9	25	27	−2	41	Qualification to Intertoto Cup third round
8	Nacional	30	11	6	13	41	38	+3	39	
9	Estrela da Amadora	30	9	8	13	23	36	−13	35	
10	Boavista	30	8	11	11	32	34	−2	35	
11	Marítimo	30	8	8	14	30	44	−14	32	
12	Naval 1º de Maio	30	7	11	12	28	37	−9	32	
13	Académica	30	6	8	16	28	46	−18	26	
14	Vitória de Setúbal	30	5	9	16	21	45	−24	24	
15	Beira-Mar (R)	30	4	11	15	28	55	−27	23	Relegation to Liga de Honra
16	Desportivo das Aves (R)	30	5	7	18	22	42	−20	22	Relegation to Liga de Honra

Source: rsssf.com
Rules for classification: 1) points; 2) head-to-head points; 3) head-to-head goal difference; 4) goal difference; 5) number of goals scored
(C) Champions; (R) Relegated

== Results ==
Home \ Away	ACA	BEM	BEL	BEN	BOA	BRA	DAV	EST	MAR	NAV	NAC	PAÇ	POR	SCP	ULE	VSE
Académica		3–1	1–1	0–2	0–2	0–1	2–0	2–0	1–2	1–2	1–3	0–2	1–2	0–2	0–0	0–1
Beira-Mar	0–1		1–2	2–2	1–0	0–3	2–2	2–0	2–2	1–3	1–1	1–1	0–5	3–3	1–0	1–1
Belenenses	1–2	2–0		1–2	0–2	2–0	1–0	3–0	2–0	0–0	2–0	2–0	0–1	0–0	0–1	2–0
Benfica	2–0	3–0	4–0		0–0	0–0	4–1	3–1	2–1	2–1	1–0	3–1	1–1	1–1	2–0	3–0
Boavista	2–2	3–0	0–0	3–0		0–1	2–1	1–1	1–1	0–1	0–4	3–1	2–1	1–1	1–1	1–1
Braga	4–2	0–0	2–1	3–1	2–2		1–0	2–1	1–4	2–1	1–1	2–1	2–1	0–1	0–1	0–0
Desportivo das Aves	2–2	0–0	0–1	0–1	1–0	0–1		0–1	1–1	2–0	3–1	0–1	0–2	0–2	0–1	1–2
Estrela da Amadora	3–3	2–2	1–0	0–1	2–1	0–0	1–0		1–0	0–0	2–0	1–0	0–3	0–1	1–1	1–0
Marítimo	0–0	2–1	1–4	0–3	1–2	1–2	0–0	2–1		1–1	1–0	1–1	1–2	0–1	2–1	1–0
Naval 1º de Maio	0–1	2–1	2–3	0–0	1–1	1–1	0–1	2–0	0–1		0–0	1–1	0–2	0–1	2–1	1–2
Nacional	4–0	3–0	2–1	0–2	2–0	0–0	3–4	1–0	3–2	1–1		5–1	1–2	0–1	2–1	1–0
Paços de Ferreira	1–1	1–0	0–2	1–1	2–0	3–2	2–0	1–1	2–1	1–1	2–1		1–1	1–1	0–0	1–0
Porto	2–1	3–0	3–1	3–2	2–0	1–0	4–1	0–1	3–0	4–0	2–0	4–0		0–1	2–1	5–1
Sporting CP	1–0	2–0	4–0	0–2	3–2	3–0	0–0	3–1	4–0	4–0	5–1	0–1	1–1		2–0	3–1
União de Leiria	2–0	2–2	0–1	0–4	0–0	1–0	3–1	0–0	1–0	2–2	1–0	0–0	1–0	0–0		1–1
Vitória de Setúbal	1–1	1–3	0–1	0–1	1–0	1–2	1–1	2–0	1–1	0–3	1–1	1–1	0–3	0–3	1–2	

Source: Foradejogo (Portuguese)
Legend: Blue = home team win; Yellow = draw; Red = away team win.

== Monthly awards ==
=== SJPF Player of the Month ===
Month	Player	Club
September	(Senegal) Modou Sougou	União de Leiria
October	(Portugal) Simão	Benfica
November	(Portugal) Ricardo Quaresma	Porto
December	(Portugal) Ricardo Quaresma	Porto
January	(Portugal) Quim	Benfica
February	(Portugal) Simão	Benfica
March	(Brazil) Ânderson Polga	Sporting CP
April	(Brazil) Liédson	Sporting CP
May	(Argentina) Leandro Romagnoli	Sporting CP

=== SJPF Young Player of the Month ===
Month	Player	Club
September		
October	(Portugal) João Moutinho	Sporting CP
November	(Portugal) João Moutinho	Sporting CP
December	(Portugal) Ruben Amorim	Belenenses
January	(Portugal) Silvestre Varela	Vitória de Setúbal
February	(Portugal) Silvestre Varela	Vitória de Setúbal
March	(Portugal) Yannick Djaló	Sporting CP
April	(Portugal) Miguel Veloso	Sporting CP
May	(Portugal) Nani	Sporting CP

== Season statistics ==
=== Top goalscorers ===
Rank	Player	Club	Goals
1	(Brazil) Liédson	Sporting CP	15
2	(Cape Verde) Dady	Belenenses	12
3	(Brazil) Adriano	Porto	11
3	(Portugal) Simão	Benfica	11
5	(Italy) Fabrizio Miccoli	Benfica	10
5	(Portugal) Hélder Postiga	Porto	10
5	(Austria) Roland Linz	Boavista	10
5	(Brazil) Nei	Naval	10
9	(Argentina) Lucho González	Porto	9
10	(Brazil) Alecsandro	Sporting CP	8
10	(Argentina) Lisandro López	Porto	8
10	(Brazil) Wender	Braga	8
10	(Portugal) José Pedro	Belenenses	8

== Attendances ==
#	Club	Average	Highest
1	Benfica	39,010	62,756
2	Porto	38,781	50,428
3	Sporting	33,285	44,042
4	Braga	12,229	29,931
5	Académica	8,751	19,464
6	Beira-Mar	6,643	29,547
7	Boavista	4,703	17,500
8	Marítimo	4,167	10,000
9	Os Belenenses	4,007	10,000
10	Vitória FC	3,427	6,372
11	Paços de Ferreira	3,267	8,000
12	Aves	3,113	7,000
13	União de Leiria	2,763	11,433
14	Estrela da Amadora	2,154	7,650
15	Naval	1,963	5,000
16	CD Nacional	1,920	3,000

== See also ==
- Liga de Honra 2006-07
- 2006–07 Portuguese football season
