= Flávio Meireles =

Portuguese footballer and football director (born 1976)

Personal information
- Full name: Flávio Miguel Magalhães Sousa Meireles
- Date of birth: 3 October 1976 (age 50)
- Place of birth: Ribeira de Pena, Portugal
- Height: 1.85 m (6 ft 1 in)
- Position: Defensive midfielder

Youth career
- 1989–1992: Ribeira de Pena
- 1992–1995: Vitória Guimarães

Senior career*
Years	Team	Apps	(Gls)
1995–1996	Vitória Guimarães	0	(0)
1996–1997	Moreirense	4	(0)
1997–1999	Fafe	22	(0)
1999–2000	Vitória Guimarães	2	(0)
2000	→ Fafe (loan)	27	(2)
2000–2003	Moreirense	90	(7)
2003–2011	Vitória Guimarães	182	(7)
Total		327	(16)
- * Club domestic league appearances and goals

Flávio Miguel Magalhães Sousa Meireles (born 3 October 1976) is a Portuguese former professional footballer who played as a defensive midfielder.

Most of his 16-year career was associated with Vitória de Guimarães, which he represented in three different spells, appearing in nearly 250 official games. He later worked as the club's sporting director.

== Club career ==
Born in Ribeira de Pena, Vila Real District, Meireles began his professional career with Vitória de Guimarães, having no impact whatsoever at the club in his first spell and moving to the lower leagues in 1996, first with Moreirense FC (where he was also featured rarely, in the Segunda Liga) then AD Fafe.

Meireles returned to Vitória in summer 1999, being quickly loaned to Fafe. In the 2000–01 campaign he switched to another former side, Moreirense, being instrumental as they – also based in Guimarães – promoted from the third division to the Primeira Liga in only two years, under manager Manuel Machado.

For 2003–04, Meireles re-joined Vitória de Guimarães for a third spell. His first appearance was on 18 August 2003, when he played the entire 1–0 home win over U.D. Leiria. At the Minho team, he was now first-choice and captain from the start, helping them achieve promotion in 2007 and qualifying for the UEFA Champions League in the following season, with the player appearing in all games but one and scoring three goals; in two different stints at the Estádio D. Afonso Henriques, he was again coached by Machado.

On 22 May 2011, after appearing in the final of the Taça de Portugal against FC Porto, the 34-year-old Meireles announced his retirement. He later became a coach at the club.

In May 2012, still with Vitória, Meireles was appointed new director of football. In remained in the position for one decade.
