= Luciano (footballer, born 1978) =

Brazilian footballer

Luciano Alexandre Silva (born 12 November 1978), known simply as Luciano, is a Brazilian former professional footballer who played as a centre back.

== Club career ==
Born in Anápolis, Goiás, Luciano played mostly with modest clubs during his Brazilian career, appearing twice in the 2002 edition of the Copa do Brasil with Londrina Esporte Clube. He also briefly represented Coritiba Football Club.

In 2006, aged nearly 28, Luciano signed with C.D. Feirense of the Portuguese second division, from Sociedade Esportiva e Recreativa Caxias do Sul. He scored four goals in 27 games in his first season, with his team finishing in seventh position.

Luciano contributed three goals from 25 matches in 2010–11 as the Santa Maria da Feira side returned to the Primeira Liga after an absence of 22 years. He made his debut in the competition on 14 August 2011 in a 0–0 home draw against C.D. Nacional, being again first choice as the campaign ended in immediate relegation.
