= Quim (footballer, born 1967) =

Portuguese footballer

Personal information
- Full name: Joaquim Manuel Aguiar Serafim
- Date of birth: 5 April 1967 (age 59)
- Place of birth: Beja, Portugal
- Height: 1.81 m (5 ft 11 in)
- Position: Centre-back

Team information
- Current team: Meizhou Hakka (assistant coach)

Youth career
- 1979–1980: Zona Azul
- 1980–1985: Desportivo Beja

Senior career*
Years	Team	Apps	(Gls)
1985–2001	Vitória Setúbal	436	(3)

International career
1987	Portugal U21	2	(0)

Managerial career
- 2007–2009: Odemirense
- 2009–2012: Vitória Setúbal (youth)
- 2009: Vitória Setúbal (caretaker)
- 2012–2014: Alcochetense
- 2014–2015: Pinhalnovense
- 2026–: Meizhou Hakka (assistant)
- * Club domestic league appearances and goals

Joaquim Manuel Aguiar Serafim (born 5 April 1967), known as Quim, is a Portuguese former football central defender and manager.

== Club career ==
Born in Beja, Alentejo, Quim spent his entire professional career with Vitória de Setúbal, appearing in 301 Primeira Liga games for the club over ten seasons. He made his debut in the competition on 23 August 1987, playing the full 90 minutes in a 3–0 home win against Académica de Coimbra.

Quim retired at the end of the 2000–01 campaign at the age of 34, after contributing 13 appearances to help the Sado River side to return to the top division after a third-place finish. He acted as their caretaker manager early into 2009–10, winning one match and losing two.

On 8 June 2026, Quim was appointed as the assistant coach of China League One of Meizhou Hakka.

== See also ==
- List of one-club men
