= Rogério Gonçalves =

Portuguese football manager (born 1959)

Personal information
- Full name: Rogério de Sousa Gonçalves
- Date of birth: 1 October 1959 (age 67)
- Place of birth: Lanheses, Portugal

Team information
- Current team: Ferroviário Beira

Managerial career
- Years: Team
- 1990–1992: Lanheses
- 1992–1995: Limianos
- 1995–1999: Vianense
- 1999–2001: Varzim
- 2002–2003: Chaves
- 2003–2004: Varzim
- 2004–2005: Naval
- 2005–2006: Leixões
- 2006: Naval
- 2006–2007: Braga
- 2007–2008: Beira Mar
- 2009: Académica
- 2010: Naval
- 2013–2015: Ferroviário Nampula
- 2017–: Ferroviário Beira

Rogério de Sousa Gonçalves (European Portuguese pronunciation: [ʁuˈʒɛɾju ðɨ ˈso(w)zɐ ɣõˈsalvɨʃ]; born 1 October 1959) is a Portuguese football manager, currently in charge of Mozambican club Clube Ferroviário da Beira.

In a career of over three decades, he had brief Primeira Liga spells at Varzim, Naval, Braga and Académica.

== Football career ==
Born in the village of Lanheses in Viana do Castelo, Gonçalves started working as a full-time manager in 1990, with hometown club UD Lanheses. In the following nine years he worked exclusively in the lower leagues, also being in charge of A.D. Os Limianos and SC Vianense.

In the summer of 1999, Gonçalves was appointed at Varzim S.C. in the Segunda Liga. He achieved promotion to the Primeira Liga at the end of his second season, but was sacked on 25 November 2001 after only achieving two wins in the first 12 games.

Gonçalves then returned to the second division, going on to work with G.D. Chaves, Associação Naval 1º de Maio and Leixões SC. On 4 March 2006, he re-signed at the second side who now competed in the top level, becoming their fourth coach of the campaign and finally leading them to safety with a 14th-place finish.

In mid-November 2006, Gonçalves replaced fired Carlos Carvalhal at the helm of S.C. Braga. Three months later, despite helping the team rise three league places to 5th and leading after one leg of a UEFA Cup last-32 tie with Parma FC, he too was dismissed and replaced by his assistant Jorge Costa. On 31 May 2007 he was appointed at division two team S.C. Beira-Mar, being sacked the following February after a ten-game winless run across all competitions.

Gonçalves signed for Académica de Coimbra in August 2009, becoming the fourth casualty of the top tier season on 2 October after failing to win once in seven league contests. On 6 October 2010 he returned to Naval, being fired due to exactly the same circumstances in December.

In January 2013, Gonçalves was appointed to his first job abroad, at Mozambique's Clube Ferroviário de Nampula. Two years later, having taken the club to runners-up in the Moçambola, he signed a new contract. He left at the end of his deal in November 2015, rejecting another club in the African country due to his desire to manage back home again.

Gonçalves headed back to Mozambique in June 2017, taking the helm at reigning champions Clube Ferroviário da Beira. That year, they became the first club from their nation to reach the quarter-finals of the CAF Champions League, losing on the away goals rule to USM Alger. In December 2018, the board decided to keep him for another season, after losing the cup final to CD Costa do Sol.
