= 2008–09 Primeira Liga =

75th season of top-tier Portuguese football

Primeira Liga
- Season: 2008–09
- Dates: 22 August 2008 – 24 May 2009
- Champions: Porto; 24th title
- Relegated: Estrela da Amadora; Trofense
- Champions League: Porto; Sporting CP
- Europa League: Benfica; Nacional; Braga; Paços de Ferreira
- Matches: 240
- Goals: 552 (2.3 per match)
- Average goals/game: 2.30
- Best Player: Bruno Alves
- Top goalscorer: Nenê (20 goals)
- Biggest home win: Braga 5–0 Estrela da Amadora (27 October 2008)
- Biggest away win: Maritimo 0–6 Benfica (12 July 2008)
- Highest scoring: Paços de Ferreira 3–4 Benfica (7 goals) (22 September 2008)
- Highest attendance: 60,022 (Benfica 2–0 Sporting CP) (27 September 2008)

The 2008–09 Primeira Liga was the 75th season of the Primeira Liga, the top professional league for Portuguese association football clubs. It began on 22 August 2008 and ended on 24 May 2009. Porto was the three-time defending champions and secured a fourth consecutive title for the second time in its history.

== Promotion and relegation ==
=== Teams relegated to Liga de Honra ===
- Boavista
- União de Leiria

União de Leiria have been relegated to the Liga de Honra after finishing in last place in 2007–08 Primeira Liga.

Boavista were also relegated as a punishment for their participation in a match fixing scandal in 2003–04 season. Accordingly, Paços de Ferreira, which was originally scheduled to be relegated, was saved from demotion.

=== Teams promoted from Liga de Honra ===
- Trofense
- Rio Ave

Leiria and Boavista were replaced by two promoted teams from Liga de Honra. The first was Trofense, which clinched the second level title. This was its first appearance in Primeira Liga.

Trofense was accompanied by Rio Ave, which returned to the Primeira Liga after two seasons in the Liga de Honra.

== Club information ==
Location of teams in the 2008–09 Liga

Club	Head coach	City	Stadium	2007–08 season
Académica	(Portugal) Domingos Paciência	Coimbra	Estádio Cidade de Coimbra	12th in the Liga
Belenenses	(Portugal) Jaime Pacheco	Lisbon	Estádio do Restelo	8th in the Liga
Benfica	(Spain) Quique Sánchez Flores	Lisbon	Estádio da Luz	4th in the Liga
Braga	(Portugal) Jorge Jesus	Braga	Estádio AXA	7th in the Liga
Estrela da Amadora	(Angola) Lázaro	Amadora	Estádio José Gomes	13th in the Liga
Leixões	(Portugal) José Mota	Matosinhos	Estádio do Mar	14th in the Liga
Marítimo	(Portugal) Carlos Carvalhal	Funchal	Estádio dos Barreiros	5th in the Liga
Nacional	(Portugal) Manuel Machado	Funchal	Estádio da Madeira	10th in the Liga
Naval 1º de Maio	(Portugal) Ulisses Morais	Figueira da Foz	Estádio Municipal José Bento Pessoa	11th in the Liga
Paços de Ferreira	(Portugal) Paulo Sérgio	Paços de Ferreira	Estádio da Mata Real	15th in the Liga
Porto	(Portugal) Jesualdo Ferreira	Porto	Estádio do Dragão	1st in the Liga
Rio Ave	(Portugal) Carlos Brito	Vila do Conde	Estádio dos Arcos	2nd in Liga de Honra
Sporting CP	(Portugal) Paulo Bento	Lisbon	Estádio José Alvalade	2nd in the Liga
Trofense	(Portugal) Tulipa	Trofa	Estádio do Clube Desportivo Trofense	1st in Liga de Honra
Vitória de Guimarães	(Portugal) Manuel Cajuda	Guimarães	Estádio D. Afonso Henriques	3rd in the Liga
Vitória de Setúbal	(Portugal) Carlos Cardoso	Setúbal	Estádio do Bonfim	6th in the Liga

== League table ==
Pos	Team	Pld	W	D	L	GF	GA	GD	Pts	Qualification or relegation
1	Porto (C)	30	21	7	2	61	18	+43	70	Qualification to Champions League group stage
2	Sporting CP	30	20	6	4	45	20	+25	66	Qualification to Champions League third qualifying round
3	Benfica	30	17	8	5	54	32	+22	59	Qualification to Europa League play-off round
4	Nacional	30	15	7	8	47	32	+15	52	Qualification to Europa League play-off round
5	Braga	30	13	11	6	38	21	+17	50	Qualification to Europa League third qualifying round
6	Leixões	30	12	9	9	30	31	−1	45	
7	Académica	30	10	9	11	28	32	−4	39	
8	Vitória de Guimarães	30	10	8	12	32	36	−4	38	
9	Marítimo	30	9	10	11	35	36	−1	37	
10	Paços de Ferreira	30	9	7	14	37	42	−5	34 (Note: Paços de Ferreira ahead of Estrela da Amadora on head-to-head record; Paços de Ferreira–Estrela da Amadora 1–0, Estrela da Amadora–Paços de Ferreira 0–2.)	Qualification to Europa League second qualifying round (Note: Since Porto, winners of 2008–09 Taça de Portugal, already qualified for 2009–10 UEFA Champions League, cup runners-up Paços de Ferreira earned a spot in the second qualifying round of the UEFA Europa League.)
11	Estrela da Amadora (R)	30	8	10	12	26	38	−12	34	Relegation to Liga de Honra (Note: Estrela da Amadora were relegated after this season ended due to financial problems. Therefore, Belenenses was saved from relegation.)
12	Rio Ave	30	8	6	16	20	35	−15	30	
13	Naval 1º de Maio	30	7	8	15	25	39	−14	29	
14	Vitória de Setúbal	30	7	5	18	21	46	−25	26	
15	Belenenses	30	5	9	16	28	52	−24	24	
16	Trofense (R)	30	5	8	17	25	42	−17	23	Relegation to Liga de Honra

Source: lpfp.pt (in Portuguese)
Rules for classification: 1) Points; 2) Head-to-head points; 3) Head-to-head goal difference; 4) Head-to-head away goals scored; 5) Goal difference; 6) Matches won; 7) Goals scored
(C) Champions; (R) Relegated

== Results ==
Home \ Away	ACA	BEL	BEN	BRA	EST	LEI	MAR	NAC	NAV	PAÇ	POR	RAV	SCP	TRO	VGU	VSE
Académica		1–0	0–2	1–1	2–2	0–0	3–1	1–1	3–1	2–1	0–3	1–0	0–0	1–0	2–1	1–0
Belenenses	1–0		0–0	0–5	2–2	0–1	0–2	1–2	1–2	2–2	1–3	1–0	1–2	3–2	1–1	2–1
Benfica	0–1	3–1		1–0	1–0	2–1	3–2	0–0	2–1	3–2	1–1	1–0	2–0	2–2	0–1	2–2
Braga	1–1	2–0	1–3		5–0	0–1	1–1	1–0	1–1	2–0	0–2	1–0	0–1	1–0	1–0	1–0
Estrela da Amadora	1–0	1–1	1–2	2–2		2–1	0–0	1–0	1–0	0–2	2–4	2–0	1–3	1–0	1–0	0–0
Leixões	0–1	2–2	1–1	2–0	1–1		1–0	1–3	1–1	2–1	1–4	1–0	0–1	2–0	2–2	0–0
Marítimo	2–0	1–1	0–6	0–0	1–0	0–0		4–2	1–0	4–1	0–3	1–1	1–2	1–1	0–1	5–1
Nacional	3–1	4–2	3–1	1–1	1–2	0–0	1–1		2–1	1–0	2–4	0–0	1–1	1–0	3–0	1–0
Naval 1º de Maio	2–1	1–1	1–2	1–2	0–0	1–0	1–0	0–4		0–0	1–0	0–1	0–1	3–1	0–0	2–2
Paços de Ferreira	1–1	1–1	3–4	0–2	1–0	4–0	2–1	2–3	2–1		0–2	2–0	0–0	1–0	1–1	2–0
Porto	2–1	2–0	1–1	1–1	3–0	2–3	0–0	1–0	2–0	2–0		3–1	0–0	0–0	2–0	2–0
Rio Ave	1–0	0–1	1–1	0–0	2–1	1–2	1–1	0–3	2–0	3–2	0–0		0–1	2–1	2–4	1–0
Sporting CP	0–0	2–0	3–2	2–3	2–1	0–1	2–0	3–1	3–1	2–0	1–2	2–0		3–1	2–0	2–1
Trofense	0–0	2–1	2–0	0–0	1–1	1–2	0–2	1–2	2–2	1–3	1–4	2–0	0–0		1–3	0–1
Vitória de Guimarães	3–2	3–1	1–2	0–0	0–0	1–0	2–1	0–2	1–0	0–0	1–3	0–1	1–2	0–1		1–1
Vitória de Setúbal	2–1	2–0	0–4	0–3	1–0	0–1	0–2	2–0	0–1	2–1	0–3	1–0	0–2	0–2	2–4	

Source: lpfp.pt (in Portuguese)
Legend: Blue = home team win; Yellow = draw; Red = away team win.

== Top scorers ==
Rank	Scorer	Club	Goals
1	(Brazil) Nenê	Nacional	20
2	(Brazil) Liédson	Sporting CP	17
2	(Paraguay) Óscar Cardozo	Benfica	17
4	(Argentina) Ernesto Farías	Porto	10
4	(Senegal) Baba Diawara	Marítimo	10
4	(Argentina) Lisandro López	Porto	10
7	(Brazil) William	Paços de Ferreira	9
7	(Argentina) Lucho González	Porto	9
9	(Cameroon) Albert Meyong	Braga	8
9	(Brazil) Hulk	Porto	8
9	(Brazil) Roberto	Vitória de Guimarães	8

== Awards ==
=== SJPF Player of the Month ===
Month	Player	Team
September	(Algeria) Hassan Yebda	Benfica
October	(Portugal) Bruno Braga	Leixões
November	(Portugal) Beto	Leixões
December	(Slovakia) Boris Peškovič	Académica
January	(Portugal) Liédson	Sporting CP
February	(Brazil) Hulk	Porto
March	(Senegal) Baba Diawara	Marítimo
April	(Portugal) Liédson	Sporting CP
May	(Paraguay) Óscar Cardozo	Benfica

=== SJPF Young Player of the Month ===
Month	Player	Club
September	(Portugal) Miguel Vítor	Benfica
October	(Portugal) Miguel Lopes	Rio Ave
November	(Portugal) Miguel Lopes	Rio Ave
December	(Portugal) Celestino	Estrela da Amadora
January	(Portugal) Bruno Gama	Vitória de Setúbal
February	(Portugal) Yazalde	Rio Ave
March	(Portugal) Daniel Carriço	Sporting CP
April	(Portugal) Rui Patrício	Sporting CP
May	(Portugal) Bruno Gama	Vitória de Setúbal

== Awards ==
- Primeira Liga Champions – Porto
- Primeira Liga Top Scorer – Nenê (20 goals)
- Primeira Liga Player of the Year – Bruno Alves
- Primeira Liga Goalkeeper of the Year – Beto
- Primeira Liga Referee of the Year – Olegário Benquerença

== Attendances ==
#	Club	Average	Highest
1	Porto	38,763	50,309
2	Benfica	35,699	60,022
3	Sporting	26,517	44,863
4	Vitória SC	16,579	26,810
5	Braga	10,552	20,321
6	Académica	5,975	18,980
7	Os Belenenses	5,073	9,635
8	Marítimo	4,941	8,234
9	Leixões	4,176	8,884
10	Vitória FC	3,834	14,827
11	Trofense	3,539	4,977
12	Rio Ave	3,311	10,426
13	Naval	2,118	8,214
14	CD Nacional	2,040	4,175
15	Paços de Ferreira	1,846	3,784
16	Estrela da Amadora	1,281	4,252
