= C.F. Estrela da Amadora (1932) =

Portuguese sports club

Estrela da Amadora
- Full name: Club Football Estrela da Amadora
- Nicknames: Tricolores (The Tricolours); Estrela (Star)
- Founded: 22 January 1932; 94 years ago
- Dissolved: 2011; 15 years ago
- Ground: Estádio José Gomes
- Capacity: 9,288
Home colours	Away colours

Clube de Futebol Estrela da Amadora (Portuguese pronunciation: [ɨʃˈtɾelɐ ðamɐˈðoɾɐ]), sometimes just Estrela, was a Portuguese sports club (predominantly football) based in Amadora, northwest of Lisbon.

Founded in 1932, its football team won the Taça de Portugal in 1990 and played at Estádio José Gomes. After bankruptcy in 2011, it reformed in 2020 as Club Football Estrela da Amadora, a brand-new club that didn't take the honours and the exact name of the original one.

== History ==
While never a contender to the place of the third-most important club in the Lisbon Football Association, Estrela da Amadora won a Cup of Portugal in 1990 and one second division championship in 1992–93. In 16 seasons in top flight football – eight consecutive – its best season was in 1997–98, when the team finished in seventh position, under the guidance of Fernando Santos.

After winning the cup in 1990, Estrela reached the second round in the UEFA Cup Winners' Cup. In the following decades, the team maintained its first division status in most seasons. In 2008–09, however, amidst serious financial difficulties, it was (twice) relegated even though it finished the campaign in mid-table.

Coach António Veloso only managed to lead Amadora to the tenth position in the third level in the 2009–10 season. Subsequently, as the club's dreadful economic situation persisted – which led to a two-year suspension from all activity by the Portuguese Football Federation – it folded.

In 2011 the club was declared insolvent by a court and closed its doors. Some supporters created a new club, Clube Desportivo Estrela in the following year to keep with youth teams and other sports, and continue with the history and legacy of Estrela da Amadora. In October 2018, CD Estrela created a senior football team.

In 2020, the club's members voted 92% in favour in July 2020 of a merger with Club Sintra Football, taking that team's place in the third-tier Campeonato de Portugal. It was not possible to revert to Estrela's original name to form a Sociedade Anónima Desportiva. The club's first season ended with promotion, despite losing the play-off final 1–0 to C.D. Trofense.

The new club didn't take the honours of any of its predecessors (Clube de Futebol Estrela da Amadora, Clube Desportivo Estrela and Club Sintra Football), so Clube de Futebol Estrela da Amadora is effectively extinct.

== League and Cup history ==
Season		Pos.	Pl.	W	D	L	GS	GA	P	Portuguese Cup	Portuguese League Cup	Notes
1988–89	1D	8	38	13	13	12	33	41	39			
1989–90	1D	13	34	10	8	16	35	34	28	Winner		
1990–91	1D	18	38	9	14	15	37	46	32			
1991–92	2H	11	34	10	13	11	30	35	33			
1992–93	2H	1	34	17	14	3	59	28	48			Promoted
1993–94	1D	9	34	9	15	10	39	36	33			
1994–95	1D	15	34	6	14	14	27	40	26			
1995–96	1D	11	34	7	4	3	35	50	35			
1996–97	1D	9	34	12	11	11	39	38	47			
1997–98	1D	7	34	14	8	12	42	41	50			Best classification ever
1998–99	1D	8	34	11	12	11	33	40	45			
1999–2000	1D	8	34	10	15	9	40	35	45			
2000–01	1D	18	34	4	7	23	30	57	19			Relegated
2001–02	2H	4	34	16	9	9	44	38	57			
2002–03	2H	3	34	15	12	7	42	32	57			Promoted
2003–04	1D	18	34	4	5	25	22	74	17			Relegated
2004–05	2H	3	34	17	9	8	47	30	60	Semi-final		Promoted
2005–06	1D	9	34	12	9	13	31	33	45	6th round		
2006–07	1D	10	30	9	8	13	23	36	35	4th round		
2007–08	1D	13	30	6	13	11	29	41	31	Quarter-final	3rd round	
2008–09	1D	11	30	8	10	12	26	38	34	Semi-final	1st group stage	Relegated
2009–10	2B	10	30	11	8	11	26	24	41	1st round		Extinct due to bankruptcy

=== Europe ===
Season	Competition	Round	Opponent	Home	Away	Aggregate
1990–91	Cup Winners' Cup	R1	(Switzerland) Neuchâtel Xamax	1–1	1–1 (4–3 p)	2–2
1990–91	Cup Winners' Cup	R2	(Belgium) RFC Liège	1–0	0–2	1–2
1998–99	Intertoto Cup	R3	(Poland) Ruch Chorzów	1–1	1–1 (2–4 p)	2–2

== Honours ==
- Taça de Portugal: 1989–90
- Segunda Liga: 1992–93

== Kit ==
Estrela's kit was split with three colours (hence the nickname 'the tricolours'): red and green fimbriated white, with the shorts and socks white. The club was longtime sponsored by national brands Tepa and Cofidis.

In 2005, Estrela decided to change the club's kit to traditional white, copying the badge (left side was red, the middle white and the right green) and taking away the old kit.

== Notable players ==
Throughout its history, Estrela da Amadora has formed and had some notable players in Portugal, and some of them internationally. Some examples are Paulo Bento (former Portuguese player and currently head coach of South Korea's national team) and Jorge Andrade (former Portuguese player who played for clubs as F.C. Porto, Deportivo de La Coruña and Juventus).

- (Portugal) Rui Águas
- (Portugal) Jorge Andrade
- (Portugal) Abel Xavier
- (Cape Verde) Bebé
- (Portugal) Paulo Bento
- (Portugal) José Calado
- (Portugal) José Carlos
- (Portugal) Dimas
- (Portugal) Paulo Fonseca
- (Portugal) Miguel
- (Portugal) Luís Vidigal
