= 2005–06 Primeira Liga =

72nd season of top-tier Portuguese football

Primeira Liga
- Season: 2005–06
- Dates: 19 August 2005 – 7 May 2006
- Champions: Porto; 21st title
- Relegated: Gil Vicente; Rio Ave; Vitória de Guimarães; Penafiel
- Champions League: Porto; Sporting CP; Benfica
- UEFA Cup: Braga; Nacional; Vitória de Setúbal
- Matches: 306
- Goals: 681 (2.23 per match)
- Average goals/game: 2.23
- Best Player: Ricardo Quaresma
- Top goalscorer: Albert Meyong (17 goals)
- Biggest home win: Braga 5–0 Rio Ave (17 February 2006)
- Biggest away win: 1-4 (3 times); 0-3 (6 times)
- Highest scoring: União de Leiria 5–2 Rio Ave (7 May 2006)

The 2005–06 Primeira Liga was the 72nd edition of top flight of Portuguese football. It started on 19 August 2005 with a match between Sporting CP and Belenenses and ended on 7 May 2006. The league was contested by 18 clubs with Benfica as defending champions.

Porto and Sporting CP were both qualified for the 2005–06 UEFA Champions League group stage, and Benfica qualified for the UEFA Champions League qualifying round; Braga, Nacional and Vitória de Setúbal qualified for the 2006–07 UEFA Cup; in opposite, with the league dropping to 16 teams, four teams were relegated to the Liga de Honra; Gil Vicente, Rio Ave, Vitória de Guimarães and Penafiel. Meyong was the top scorer with 17 goals.

The season's first goal was scored by Rogério, who scored a 39th-minute goal for Sporting against Belenenses. The first yellow card of the season was given to Sporting's Fábio Rochemback in the opening game of the season, and the first red card was given to Benfica's João Pereira in his club's away draw against Académica de Coimbra.

== Promotion and relegation ==
=== Teams relegated to Liga de Honra ===
- Moreirense
- Beira-Mar
- Estoril

Moreirense, Beira-Mar and Estoril were relegated to the Liga de Honra following their final classification in 2004–05 season.

=== Teams promoted from Liga de Honra ===
- Estrela da Amadora
- Paços de Ferreira
- Naval 1º de Maio

The other three teams were replaced by Estrela da Amadora, Paços de Ferreira and Naval 1º de Maio from the Liga de Honra.

Location of teams in the 2005-06 Liga
Location of teams in the '2005-06 Liga

== Club information ==
Club	Season's Last Head Coach	City	Stadium	2004–2005 season
Académica de Coimbra	(Portugal) Nelo Vingada	Coimbra	Estádio Cidade de Coimbra	14th
Belenenses	(Portugal) Carlos Carvalhal	Lisbon	Estádio do Restelo	9th
Benfica	(Netherlands) Ronald Koeman	Lisbon	Estádio da Luz	1st
Boavista	(Portugal) Carlos Brito	Porto	Estádio do Bessa – Século XXI	6th
Braga	(Portugal) Jesualdo Ferreira	Braga	Estádio Municipal de Braga – AXA	4th
Estrela da Amadora	(Portugal) Toni Conceição	Amadora	Estádio José Gomes	3rd in the Liga de Honra
Gil Vicente	(Portugal) Paulo Alves	Barcelos	Estádio Cidade de Barcelos	13th
União de Leiria	(Portugal) Jorge Jesus	Leiria	Estádio Dr. Magalhães Pessoa	15th
Penafiel	(Portugal) Luís Castro	Penafiel	Estádio Municipal 25 de Abril	11th
Marítimo	(Portugal) Ulisses Morais	Funchal	Estádio dos Barreiros	7th
Nacional	(Portugal) Manuel Machado	Funchal	Estádio da Madeira	12th
Naval 1° de Maio	(Portugal) Rogério Gonçalves	Figueira da Foz	Estádio Municipal José Bento Pessoa	2nd in the Liga de Honra
Paços de Ferreira	(Portugal) José Mota	Paços de Ferreira	Estádio da Mata Real	1st in the Liga de Honra
Porto	(Netherlands) Co Adriaanse	Porto	Estádio do Dragão	2nd
Sporting CP	(Portugal) Paulo Bento	Lisbon	Estádio José Alvalade – Século XXI	3rd
Rio Ave	(Portugal) João Eusébio	Vila do Conde	Estádio dos Arcos	8th
Vitória de Guimarães	(Portugal) Vítor Pontes	Guimarães	Estádio D. Afonso Henriques	5th
Vitória de Setúbal	(Portugal) Hélio Sousa	Setúbal	Estádio do Bonfim	10th

== League table ==
Pos	Team	Pld	W	D	L	GF	GA	GD	Pts	Qualification or relegation
1	Porto (C)	34	24	7	3	54	16	+38	79	Qualification to Champions League group stage
2	Sporting CP	34	22	6	6	50	24	+26	72	Qualification to Champions League group stage
3	Benfica	34	20	7	7	51	29	+22	67	Qualification to Champions League third qualifying round
4	Braga	34	17	7	10	38	22	+16	58	Qualification to UEFA Cup first round
5	Nacional	34	14	10	10	40	32	+8	52	Qualification to UEFA Cup first round
6	Boavista	34	12	14	8	37	29	+8	50	
7	União de Leiria	34	13	8	13	44	42	+2	47	
8	Vitória de Setúbal	34	14	4	16	28	33	−5	46	Qualification to UEFA Cup first round (Note: Since the Taça de Portugal winners Porto qualified for the Champions League, their place in the UEFA Cup went to Vitória de Setúbal, who were the Taça de Portugal runners-up.)
9	Estrela da Amadora	34	12	9	13	31	33	−2	45	
10	Marítimo	34	10	14	10	38	37	+1	44	
11	Paços de Ferreira	34	11	9	14	38	49	−11	42	
12	Gil Vicente (R)	34	11	7	16	37	42	−5	40	Relegation to Liga de Honra (Note: Gil Vicente fielded an ineligible player, Angolan forward Mateus. Due to this they lost the right to participate in the 2006–07 Primeira Liga which as a result meant Belenenses remained in the league)
13	Académica	34	10	9	15	37	48	−11	39	
14	Naval 1º de Maio	34	11	6	17	35	48	−13	39	
15	Belenenses	34	11	6	17	40	42	−2	39	Spared from relegation
16	Rio Ave (R)	34	8	10	16	34	53	−19	34	Relegation to Liga de Honra
17	Vitória de Guimarães (R)	34	8	10	16	28	41	−13	34	Relegation to Liga de Honra
18	Penafiel (R)	34	2	9	23	21	61	−40	15	Relegation to Liga de Honra

Source: Foradejogo
Rules for classification: 1) points; 2) head-to-head points; 3) head-to-head goal difference; 4) goal difference; 5) number of goals scored
(C) Champions; (R) Relegated

== Results ==
Home \ Away	ACA	BEL	BEN	BOA	BRA	EST	GVI	MAR	NAV	NAC	PAÇ	PEN	POR	RAV	SCP	ULE	VGU	VSE
Académica		0–1	0–0	0–2	0–3	1–0	2–0	2–2	2–2	0–0	3–0	1–0	0–1	2–2	0–3	1–3	1–0	0–1
Belenenses	0–0		1–2	1–1	2–0	0–2	0–2	0–1	2–3	1–0	2–0	5–0	0–2	1–2	0–1	3–1	3–1	3–1
Benfica	3–0	0–0		1–0	1–0	2–0	0–2	2–2	0–0	1–0	2–0	4–0	1–0	2–2	1–3	4–0	2–1	1–0
Boavista	2–1	0–2	0–2		0–0	2–1	2–0	1–1	3–0	0–3	4–1	2–1	1–1	2–1	2–2	2–0	1–1	0–0
Braga	2–0	2–0	3–2	1–0		1–1	1–1	2–0	1–0	1–0	2–3	1–0	0–0	5–0	3–2	1–0	1–0	0–1
Estrela da Amadora	3–2	1–2	1–2	1–1	0–0		1–0	2–2	2–1	0–2	0–0	1–0	2–1	0–0	0–0	1–2	2–0	1–0
Gil Vicente	4–3	1–0	1–3	0–1	2–1	1–1		1–0	2–0	0–1	2–0	2–2	0–1	1–0	2–2	1–2	1–1	5–0
Marítimo	2–2	1–0	0–1	1–1	1–0	1–0	1–1		2–1	2–0	1–1	2–2	2–2	0–0	1–2	3–0	0–1	1–0
Naval 1º de Maio	0–1	2–1	1–1	2–2	0–1	2–0	1–4	2–0		3–1	1–0	4–1	2–3	1–0	0–2	0–2	0–0	0–3
Nacional	2–2	4–0	1–1	1–0	1–0	1–2	2–0	2–1	2–0		2–2	2–0	0–1	1–1	2–1	1–4	1–1	2–2
Paços de Ferreira	2–1	1–1	3–1	0–1	1–0	2–1	1–0	1–2	3–1	0–1		2–2	0–1	2–1	3–0	1–1	1–1	1–2
Penafiel	1–0	0–3	1–3	0–0	0–0	0–1	1–1	3–2	0–1	1–2	2–2		0–1	0–2	0–1	1–1	0–1	0–1
Porto	5–1	2–0	0–2	1–0	1–1	1–0	3–0	1–0	1–0	3–0	3–0	3–1		3–0	1–1	1–0	3–1	0–0
Rio Ave	1–4	2–1	0–1	1–1	1–2	2–1	1–0	2–2	0–1	0–2	2–2	2–0	0–0		1–3	1–2	3–1	1–0
Sporting CP	0–1	2–1	2–1	1–0	1–0	0–1	2–0	1–1	0–0	1–0	3–0	2–0	0–1	3–0		2–1	2–0	1–0
União de Leiria	0–2	2–2	3–1	0–0	0–1	1–1	3–0	0–0	2–1	0–0	3–0	1–1	1–3	5–2	0–1		1–0	0–2
Vitória de Guimarães	1–1	2–2	2–0	1–1	0–2	0–1	2–0	1–0	0–2	0–0	0–2	3–1	0–2	1–1	0–1	0–3		4–0
Vitória de Setúbal	0–1	1–0	0–1	0–2	1–0	1–0	1–0	0–1	4–1	1–1	0–1	2–0	0–2	1–0	1–2	2–0	0–1	

Source: Foradejogo (in Portuguese)
Legend: Blue = home team win; Yellow = draw; Red = away team win.

== Top goal scorers ==
Rank	Scorer	Goals	Team
1	(Cameroon) Albert Meyong	17	Belenenses
2	(Portugal) Nuno Gomes	15	Benfica
2	(Brazil) Liédson	15	Sporting CP
2	(Portugal) João Tomás	15	Braga
5	(Brazil) André Pinto	14	Nacional
6	(Brazil) Joeano	13	Académica de Coimbra
7	(Poland) Marek Saganowski	12	Vitória de Guimarães
8	(Brazil) Alexandre	10	Nacional
8	(Argentina) Lucho González	10	Porto
8	(Brazil) Gaúcho	10	Rio Ave

== Awards ==
=== Footballer of the Year ===
The Footballer of the Year award was won by the Portuguese Ricardo Quaresma of Porto, for a second successive season.

=== Portuguese Golden Shoe ===
The Portuguese Golden Shoe award was won by the Cameroonian Albert Meyong of Belenenses, scoring 17 goals.

== Attendances ==
#	Club	Average	Highest
1	Benfica	43,057	63,489
2	Porto	38,679	50,109
3	Sporting	31,640	48,018
4	Vitória SC	15,979	23,183
5	Braga	11,550	25,000
6	Académica	9,865	26,118
7	Os Belenenses	5,365	16,000
8	Boavista	4,694	9,500
9	Gil Vicente	4,495	10,653
10	Marítimo	4,324	10,000
11	Vitória FC	3,835	8,000
12	União de Leiria	3,256	16,796
13	Paços de Ferreira	3,076	5,000
14	Rio Ave	2,824	6,000
15	Penafiel	2,253	8,000
16	Naval	2,101	6,000
17	CD Nacional	1,935	3,000
18	Estrela da Amadora	1,865	5,000
