= 2007–08 Primeira Liga =

74th season of top-tier Portuguese football

Primeira Liga
- Season: 2007–08
- Dates: 17 August 2007 – 11 May 2008
- Champions: Porto (23rd title)
- Relegated: Boavista; União de Leiria
- Champions League: Porto; Sporting CP; Vitória de Guimarães
- UEFA Cup: Benfica; Marítimo; Vitória de Setúbal
- Matches: 240
- Goals: 554 (2.31 per match)
- Best Player: Lisandro López
- Top goalscorer: Lisandro López (24 goals)
- Biggest home win: Porto 6–0 Estrela da Amadora (5 April 2008)
- Biggest away win: Vitória de Guimarães 0–5 Porto (27 April 2008)
- Highest scoring: Benfica 6–1 Boavista (11 November 2007); Boavista 4–3 Paços de Ferreira (3 February 2008)
- Highest attendance: 60,116 (Benfica 0–1 Porto) (1 December 2007)

The 2007–08 Primeira Liga was the 74th edition of the Primeira Liga, the top professional league for Portuguese association football clubs. It started on 17 August 2007 and ended on 11 May 2008, with the fixtures announced on 12 July 2007. Porto were the two-time defending champions, having won their 22nd title the previous season, and secured a third consecutive title for the second time in their history.

Porto and Sporting CP both qualified for the 2008–09 UEFA Champions League group stage; Benfica, Marítimo and Vitória de Setúbal qualified for the 2008–09 UEFA Cup; in the opposite direction, Boavista and União de Leiria were relegated to the Liga de Honra. Lisandro López was the top scorer with 24 goals.

== Promotion and relegation ==
=== Teams relegated to Liga de Honra ===
- Desportivo das Aves
- Beira Mar

Desportivo das Aves and Beira-Mar were both consigned to Liga de Honra following their final classification in 2006–07.

=== Teams promoted from Liga de Honra ===
- Leixões
- Vitória de Guimarães

Desportivo das Aves and Beira-Mar will be replaced by two promoted teams from the Liga de Honra. The first is Leixões, who clinched the second level title, and are returning to the top level since their last participation in 1989. The other was Vitória de Guimarães, who managed to return to the Liga after a brief spell in the Liga de Honra.

== Club information ==
Location of teams in the 2007-08 Liga
Location of teams in Madeira

Club	Head coach	City	Stadium	2006–2007 season
Académica	(Portugal) Domingos Paciência	Coimbra	Estádio Cidade de Coimbra	13th
Belenenses	(Portugal) Jorge Jesus	Lisbon	Estádio do Restelo	5th
Benfica	(Portugal) Fernando Chalana	Lisbon	Estádio do Sport Lisboa e Benfica (Estádio da Luz)	3rd
Boavista	(Portugal) Jaime Pacheco	Porto	Estádio do Bessa – Século XXI	9th
Braga	(Portugal) Jorge Costa	Braga	Estádio AXA (Estádio Municipal de Braga)	4th
Estrela da Amadora	(Portugal) Daúto Faquirá	Amadora	Estádio José Gomes	10th
União de Leiria	(Portugal) Paulo Duarto	Leiria	Estádio Municipal de Leiria Dr. Magalhães Pessoa	7th
Leixões	(Portugal) Carlos Brito	Matosinhos	Estádio do Mar	1st in the Liga de Honra
Marítimo	(Brazil) Sebastião Lazaroni	Funchal	Estádio dos Barreiros	12th
Nacional	(Serbia) Predrag Jokanović	Funchal	Estádio da Madeira	8th
Naval 1° de Maio	(Portugal) Ulisses Morais	Figueira da Foz	Estádio Municipal José Bento Pessoa	11th
Paços de Ferreira	(Portugal) José Mota	Paços de Ferreira	Estádio da Mata Real	6th
Porto	(Portugal) Jesualdo Ferreira	Porto	Estádio do Dragão	1st
Sporting CP	(Portugal) Paulo Bento	Lisbon	Estádio José Alvalade – Século XXI	2nd
Vitória de Guimarães	(Portugal) Manuel Cajuda	Guimarães	Estádio D. Afonso Henriques	2nd in the Liga de Honra
Vitória de Setúbal	(Portugal) Carlos Carvalhal	Setúbal	Estádio do Bonfim	14th

=== Managerial changes ===
Club	Outgoing manager	Date of vacancy	Replaced by	Date of appointment	Ref
Benfica	(Portugal) Fernando Santos	20 August 2007	(Spain) José Antonio Camacho	20 August 2007	
Académica	(Portugal) Manuel Machado	10 September 2007	(Portugal) Domingos Paciência	11 September 2007	
Naval 1° de Maio	(Portugal) Francisco Chaló	16 September 2007	(Portugal) Ulisses Morais	4 October 2007	
Benfica	(Spain) José Antonio Camacho	9 March 2008	(Portugal) Fernando Chalana	10 March 2008	

== League table ==
Pos	Team	Pld	W	D	L	GF	GA	GD	Pts	Qualification or relegation
1	Porto (Note: Porto were docked 6 points due to attempted bribery of referees in the 2003–04 season. However, the Council of Justice of the Portuguese Federation returned them in 2017.) (C)	30	24	3	3	60	13	+47	75	Qualification to Champions League group stage
2	Sporting CP	30	16	7	7	46	28	+18	55	Qualification to Champions League group stage
3	Vitória de Guimarães	30	15	8	7	35	31	+4	53	Qualification to Champions League third qualifying round
4	Benfica	30	13	13	4	45	21	+24	52	Qualification to UEFA Cup first round
5	Marítimo	30	14	4	12	39	28	+11	46	Qualification to UEFA Cup first round
6	Vitória de Setúbal	30	11	12	7	37	33	+4	45	Qualification to UEFA Cup first round
7	Braga	30	10	11	9	32	34	−2	41	Qualification to Intertoto Cup third round
8	Belenenses (Note: Belenenses were docked 3 points for fielding an ineligible player.)	30	11	10	9	35	33	+2	40	
9	Boavista (R)	30	8	12	10	32	41	−9	36	Relegation to Liga de Honra (Note: Boavista was relegated to Liga de Honra for next season due to bribery of referees in the 2003-04 season. They were reinstated back to the top league, from the 3rd tier, in 2014)
10	Nacional	30	9	8	13	23	28	−5	35	
11	Naval 1º de Maio	30	9	7	14	26	45	−19	34	
12	Académica	30	6	14	10	31	38	−7	32	
13	Estrela da Amadora	30	6	13	11	29	41	−12	31	
14	Leixões	30	4	14	12	27	37	−10	26	
15	Paços de Ferreira (Note: Paços de Ferreira were originally relegated but stayed in the league because of Boavista being relegated over the bribery scandal.)	30	6	7	17	31	49	−18	25	
16	União de Leiria (R)	30	3	7	20	25	53	−28	16	Relegation to Liga de Honra

Source: BDFutbol
Rules for classification: 1) points; 2) goal difference; 3) number of goals scored.
(C) Champions; (R) Relegated

== Results ==
Home \ Away	ACA	BEL	BEN	BOA	EST	LEI	MAR	NAC	NAV	PAÇ	POR	SCP	BRA	ULE	VGU	VSE
Académica		0–0	1–3	1–1	3–3	1–1	1–0	1–0	1–1	1–0	0–1	1–1	3–3	1–1	0–0	0–0
Belenenses	0–0		1–0	2–3	0–0	1–1	1–3	1–1	0–3 (Note: Belenenses 0–3 Naval was awarded after Belenenses was punished for fielding ineligible player)	1–0	1–2	1–0	0–2	2–1	1–1	5–0
Benfica	0–3	2–0		6–1	3–0	0–0	2–1	0–0	3–0	4–1	0–1	0–0	1–1	2–2	0–0	3–0
Boavista	0–0	2–4	0–0		2–1	0–0	0–2	1–0	2–0	4–3	0–0	2–0	0–0	3–1	3–2	3–3
Estrela da Amadora	3–1	0–2	0–0	0–0		2–0	1–1	0–1	3–1	1–0	2–2	0–2	1–1	4–2	4–1	0–1
Leixões	2–2	1–2	1–1	2–2	0–0		0–1	1–1	0–1	1–0	1–2	1–1	3–0	2–1	2–2	1–1
Marítimo	2–0	2–0	1–1	2–0	1–1	2–1		1–0	0–1	3–1	0–3	1–2	4–1	2–0	0–1	0–0
Nacional	0–3	1–2	0–3	2–0	0–0	1–0	0–2		2–0	1–2	1–0	0–0	0–1	2–0	1–0	0–0
Naval 1º de Maio	0–1	1–1	0–2	1–0	1–1	2–1	0–3	1–1		2–1	0–2	1–4	1–1	1–0	1–4	0–0
Paços de Ferreira	1–1	1–2	1–2	1–1	2–1	1–1	3–1	1–0	2–2		0–2	0–1	0–2	2–1	2–2	2–1
Porto	1–0	1–1	2–0	2–0	6–0	3–0	1–0	0–3	1–0	3–0		1–0	4–0	4–0	2–0	2–0
Sporting CP	4–1	1–0	1–1	2–1	2–0	2–0	2–1	4–1	4–1	2–1	2–0		2–0	1–1	3–0	2–2
Braga	2–1	1–1	0–0	0–0	2–1	0–0	2–1	1–0	1–1	2–1	1–2	3–0		0–1	0–0	2–3
União de Leiria	3–1	1–2	1–2	0–0	0–0	1–3	1–2	1–3	0–2	1–1	0–3	4–1	0–0		0–1	0–2
Vitória de Guimarães	2–1	1–0	1–3	1–0	4–0	2–1	1–0	1–0	1–0	0–0	0–5	2–0	1–0	2–1		1–1
Vitória de Setúbal	3–1	1–1	1–1	3–1	0–0	2–0	1–0	1–1	1–2	3–1	1–2	1–0	3–1	2–0	0–1	

Source: www.lpfp.pt
Legend: Blue = home team win; Yellow = draw; Red = away team win.

== Season statistics ==
=== Scoring ===
- First goal of the season: Derlei for Sporting CP against Académica (17 August 2007)
- Fastest goal in a match: Kanú (2 minutes) for Marítimo against Boavista (26 August 2007)
- Goal scored at the latest point in a match: Udo Nwoko (90'+3') for Leixões against Benfica (18 August 2007)
- Widest winning margin: Porto 6–0 Estrela da Amadora (28 April 2008)
- The first hat-trick: by Lito in Académica 3–3 Estrela da Amadora (4 November 2007)
- Most goals in a match:
  - Benfica 6–1 Boavista (11 November 2007)
  - Boavista 4–3 Paços de Ferreira (3 February 2008)

=== Cards ===
- First yellow card: Pedro Roma for Académica against Sporting CP (17 August 2007)
- First red card: Rodrigo Silva for Nacional against Estrela da Amadora (18 August 2007)

== Top scorers ==
Rank	Player	Club	Goals
1	(Argentina) Lisandro López	Porto	24
2	(Paraguay) Óscar Cardozo	Benfica	13
3	(Brazil) Weldon	Belenenses	12
4	(Brazil) Wesley	Paços de Ferreira	11
4	(Brazil) Liédson	Sporting CP	11
4	(Austria) Roland Linz	Braga	11
7	(Brazil) Marcelinho	Naval	10
8	(Cape Verde) Lito	Académica	9
9	(Portugal) João Paulo	União de Leiria	8
9	(Portugal) Jorge Ribeiro	Boavista	8
9	(Portugal) Ricardo Quaresma	Porto	8
9	(Portugal) José Pedro	Belenenses	8

== Awards ==
=== Footballer of the Year ===
Name	Team	League Stats	
Name	Team	Apps	Goals
(Argentina) Lisandro López	Porto	27	24

=== Monthly awards ===
==== SJPF Player of the Month ====
Month	Player	Club
September	(Portugal) Rui Costa	Benfica
October	(Argentina) Lucho González	Porto
November	(Portugal) Jorge Ribeiro	Boavista
December	(Liechtenstein) Peter Jehle	Boavista
January	(Argentina) Lisandro López	Porto
February	(Argentina) Lisandro López	Porto
March	(Brazil) Pitbull	Vitória de Setúbal
April	(Uruguay) Luis Aguiar	Académica

==== SJPF Young Player of the Month ====
Month	Player	Club
September	(Portugal) Paulo Machado	Leixões
October	(Portugal) João Moutinho	Sporting CP
November	(Portugal) João Moutinho	Sporting CP
December	(Portugal) Tiago Gomes	Estrela da Amadora
January	(Portugal) Rui Patrício	Sporting CP
February	(Portugal) João Moutinho	Sporting CP
March	(Portugal) João Moutinho	Sporting CP
April	(Portugal) Paulo Machado	Leixões

==== SJPF Fair Play Award ====
Month	Club
September	Sporting CP

Source: sjpf.pt (Portuguese)

== Attendances ==
#	Club	Average	Highest
1	Porto	38,632	50,199
2	Benfica	37,558	60,116
3	Sporting	29,381	40,659
4	Vitória SC	19,578	30,000
5	Braga	15,614	25,745
6	Académica	6,872	19,068
7	Marítimo	5,825	8,440
8	Boavista	5,386	17,875
9	Leixões	5,039	12,710
10	Vitória FC	3,256	4,850
11	Os Belenenses	2,810	7,889
12	União de Leiria	2,253	8,960
13	Naval	2,216	4,981
14	Paços de Ferreira	2,045	3,390
15	CD Nacional	1,579	4,711
16	Estrela da Amadora	1,408	4,503

== See also ==
- Apito Dourado
