= Associação Naval 1º de Maio =

Portuguese association football club

Associação Naval 1º Maio
- Full name: Associação Naval 1º de Maio
- Nickname: Navalistas (Those who support Naval)
- Short name: Naval
- Founded: 1 May 1893; 132 years ago
- Dissolved: 2017
- Ground: José Bento Pessoa, Figueira da Foz, Portugal
- Capacity: 9,000
- Chairman: Aprígio Santos
- Manager: Carlos Neves
- League: Division of Honour in the, Coimbra Football Association
- Website: www.naval1893.pt/o-clube/
Home colours	Away colours

Associação Naval 1º de Maio or Naval 1º Maio, commonly known as Naval, was a Portuguese football club based in Figueira da Foz, Coimbra District. Founded on 1 May 1893, it last played in the Division of Honour in the Coimbra Football Association, holding home games at the Estádio Municipal José Bento Pessoa, with a capacity of 9,000 spectators. The club spent six seasons between 2005 and 2011 in the first division, the Primeira Liga.

Naval was one of the main teams from the Centro Region, alongside Académica de Coimbra, Beira-Mar, União de Leiria and União de Coimbra. The team was dissolved in 2017.

== History ==
After several years in the second division, Naval first promoted to the first level in 2005, after finishing in second position behind Paços de Ferreira. In its first season in the top flight, the club finished in 13th position, finally moving up to 12th after the resolutions on the "Mateus Affair", which involved Gil Vicente and Belenenses.

In the following three years, Naval ranked between places 11–13, also reaching the Taça de Portugal quarter-finals twice. In 2009–10, former Sporting CP, Porto and Portugal national team great Augusto Inácio led the Figueira da Foz team to its best season ever, an eight-place finish in the league and the semi-finals of the domestic cup, a 1–3 aggregate loss against Chaves.

Naval returned to division two at the end of the 2010–11 season, after two coaching changes. Highlights included a 2–1 home win against Benfica and a 3–3 draw at Sporting CP. In April 2013, the club were deducted 12 points by order of world football governing body FIFA, due to outstanding debts to two teams in Brazil; another relegation followed.

Due to legal solutions, the club was forced to change its name to Associação Naval 1893. The club last played in the Honor Division (Coimbra Football Association).

== Last playing squad ==
As of 13 October 2024

Note: Flags indicate national team as defined under FIFA eligibility rules; some limited exceptions apply. Players may hold more than one non-FIFA nationality.

No.	Pos.	Nation	Player
—	GK	POR	Léo Ferreira
—	GK	LVA	Lukass Zuravlovs
—	GK	POR	Vasco Guimarães
—	DF	POR	Rodrigo Coutinho
—	DF	BRA	Willian Nascimento
—	DF	POR	Pedro Alves
—	DF	BRA	Mateus Constantin
—	DF	POR	Paganini
—	DF	POR	Gonçalo Maria
—	DF	POR	Leonardo Nunes
—	DF	POR	João Nogueira
—	DF	CIV	Carlos Zogbo
—	MF	POR	Paulo Grilo

No.	Pos.	Nation	Player
—	MF	BRA	Gabriel Bento
—	MF	BRA	Maurício
—	MF	POR	Bernardo Sarmento
—	MF	POR	Gui Monteiro
—	MF	POR	Nuno André
—	FW	POR	Rodrigo Seco
—	FW	BRA	Pedrinho
—	FW	POR	André Jorge
—	FW	POR	Tiago Lopes
—	FW	GNB	Mamadu Sané
—	FW	POR	Pedro Costa
—	FW	BRA	Dadal

== League and cup history ==
Season	Tier	Finish	GP	W	D	L	GS	GA	P	Portuguese Cup	Notes
1998–99	2	13	34	9	11	14	34	54	38	Round 4	
1999–00	2	13	34	11	9	14	53	55	42	Round 5	
2000–01	2	9	34	16	6	14	49	45	48	Round 3	
2001–02	2	12	34	10	12	12	54	50	42	Round 4	
2002–03	2	4	34	13	16	5	40	25	55	Semi-final	
2003–04	2	7	34	12	10	12	46	42	46	Quarter-final	
2004–05	2	2	34	17	11	6	52	30	62	Round 3	Promoted
2005–06	1	13	34	11	6	17	35	48	39	Round 4	
2006–07	1	12	30	7	11	12	28	37	32	Round 4	
2007–08	1	11	30	9	7	14	26	45	34	Quarter-final	
2008–09	1	13	30	7	8	15	25	39	29	Quarter-final	
2009–10	1	8	30	10	6	14	20	35	36	Semi-final	Best league finish
2010–11	1	16	30	5	8	17	26	51	23	Round 3	Relegated
2011–12	2	4	30	12	10	8	40	33	46	Round 4	
2012–13	2	18	42	13	18	11	51	50	40	Round 3	Deducted 17 points due to debts Voluntarily relegated
2013–14	3	8	18	4	7	7	18	29	19	Round 1	5th in relegation group
2014–15	3	7	18	7	2	9	16	24	23	Round 2	6th in relegation group Defeated Fátima in relegation playout
2015–16	3	6	18	5	6	7	14	15	21	Round 3	5th in relegation group

== Managers ==
- (Portugal) Ulisses Morais (1995–1997, 2007–2009)
- (Brazil) Guto Ferreira (2003)
- (Portugal) Toni (2003–2004)
- (Portugal) Rogério Gonçalves (2004–2005, 2006, 2010)
- (Portugal) Manuel Cajuda (2005)
- (Portugal) Álvaro Magalhães (2005–2006)
- (Portugal) Mariano Barreto (2006–2007)
- (Portugal) Francisco Chaló (2007)
- (Portugal) Augusto Inácio (2009–2010)
- (France) Victor Zvunka (2010)
- (Brazil) Carlos Mozer (2011)
