= Gaspar Azevedo =

Portuguese footballer

Gaspar
Personal information
- Full name: José Gaspar da Silva Azevedo
- Date of birth: 1 June 1975 (age 51)
- Place of birth: Santo Tirso, Portugal
- Height: 1.90 m (6 ft 3 in)
- Position: Centre-back

Youth career
- 1987–1993: Trofense

Senior career*
Years	Team	Apps	(Gls)
1993–1995	Trofense		
1995–1996	Tirsense	25	(2)
1996–1997	Vitória Setúbal	28	(0)
1997–2001	Porto	9	(1)
1998–1999	→ Leça (loan)	22	(2)
1999–2000	→ Alverca (loan)	26	(1)
2000–2001	→ Paços Ferreira (loan)	14	(2)
2001–2002	Alverca	22	(1)
2002–2004	Gil Vicente	61	(9)
2004–2005	Ajaccio	16	(0)
2005–2007	Belenenses	34	(0)
2007–2012	Rio Ave	130	(7)
2012–2013	Covilhã	31	(1)
2013–2014	Varzim	28	(1)
Total		429	(27)

International career
1996–1997	Portugal U21	2	(0)
- * Club domestic league appearances and goals

José Gaspar da Silva Azevedo (born 1 June 1975), known simply as Gaspar, is a Portuguese former professional footballer who played as a central defender.

== Club career ==
Gaspar was born in Santo Tirso, Porto District. During the vast majority of his career, he rarely spent more than one season with the same club. He represented C.D. Trofense, F.C. Tirsense (where he made his Primeira Liga debut), Vitória de Setúbal, FC Porto (which were crowned league champions at the end of the 1997–98 campaign, but he was only fourth of fifth choice in his position), Leça FC – in a brief return to the Segunda Liga – F.C. Alverca (he represented the Lisbon side on two occasions), F.C. Paços de Ferreira and Gil Vicente FC.

In the 2004–05 campaign, Gaspar played for AC Ajaccio in France, appearing in 16 Ligue 1 matches, then switched back to his country with C.F. Os Belenenses. At the age of already 32 he would settle at Rio Ave FC, helping the Vila do Conde team to return to the top division in his first season while adding a round-of-16 presence in the Taça de Portugal.

From 2008 to 2011, Gaspar only missed five league matches for Rio Ave, also netting three goals as the club consecutively managed to retain its league status. In July 2012, having made a total of 322 appearances in the Portuguese top tier (19 goals), he signed for one year with S.C. Covilhã of division two.

== Post-retirement ==
After retiring, Gaspar worked in precision metalworking.

== Honours ==
Porto

- Primeira Liga: 1997–98
- Taça de Portugal: 1997–98
