= Carlos Cardoso (footballer) =

Portuguese footballer and manager (1944–2025)

Personal information
- Full name: Carlos Alberto Lourenço Cardoso
- Date of birth: 29 December 1944
- Place of birth: Setúbal, Portugal
- Date of death: 27 December 2025 (aged 80)
- Position: Defender

Youth career
- Vitória Setúbal

Senior career*
Years	Team	Apps	(Gls)
1964–1977	Vitória Setúbal	284	(2)

International career
1969	Portugal	1	(0)

Managerial career
- 1979–1980: Barreirense
- 1980–1982: Nacional
- 1985–1986: O Elvas
- 1986–1987: União da Madeira
- 1987-1988: Lusit. Évora
- 1988–1990: O Elvas
- 1990–1991: Barreirense
- 1991–1992: Benfica Castelo Branco
- 1992–1994: O Elvas
- 1994–1995: Juventude Évora
- 1998–1999: Vitória Setúbal
- 2003: Vitória Setúbal
- 2006–2007: Vitória Setúbal
- 2009: Vitória Setúbal
- * Club domestic league appearances and goals

Carlos Alberto Lourenço Cardoso (29 December 1944 – 27 December 2025) was a Portuguese footballer who played as a defender and later became a manager.

Cardoso's playing career saw him play only for his boyhood club Vitória de Setúbal between 1964 and 1977. Cardoso was part of the Setúbal side that won the Taça de Portugal in the 1964–65 and 1966–67 seasons.

He was also the manager responsible for promoting Lusitano de Évora from the third division to the second division in 1988.

Cardoso managed Vitória de Setúbal on four different spells, with the most recent being in 2009.

Cardoso died on 27 December 2025 at the age of 80.
