= Carlos Brito (footballer, born 1963) =

Portuguese football manager and former player

Personal information
- Full name: Carlos Luís Cereja de Morais Brito
- Date of birth: 21 September 1963 (age 63)
- Place of birth: Porto, Portugal
- Height: 1.80 m (5 ft 11 in)
- Position: Centre back

Youth career
- 1977–1980: Progresso
- 1980–1982: Boavista

Senior career*
Years	Team	Apps	(Gls)
1982–1985	Boavista	8	(3)
1985–1990	Salgueiros	129	(6)
1990–1996	Rio Ave	154	(7)
Total		291	(16)

Managerial career
- 1996–2000: Rio Ave
- 2000–2001: Estrela Amadora
- 2002–2005: Rio Ave
- 2005–2006: Boavista
- 2006–2007: Nacional
- 2007–2008: Leixões
- 2009–2012: Rio Ave
- 2015: Penafiel
- 2016: Freamunde
- * Club domestic league appearances and goals

Carlos Luís Cereja de Morais Brito (born 21 September 1963) is a Portuguese retired footballer who played as a central defender, and is a manager.

Most of his career was associated with Rio Ave, which he represented as both a player and manager, the latter in various spells.

== Playing career ==
Born in Porto, Portugal, Brito played for three northern clubs during his 14-year professional career. After starting with local Boavista FC, where he could hardly get a game, he moved to neighbours S.C. Salgueiros.

Brito's best year in the Primeira Liga came in the 1987–88 season, when he scored three goals while appearing in all 38 matches, but his team was eventually relegated after finishing in 19th position. He wrapped up his career with Rio Ave FC, helping the Vila do Conde side promote to the second division in 1991 – his first year – and retiring as a player at nearly 33.

== Coaching career ==
In 1996, with Rio Ave back in the top flight, Brito replaced Henrique Calisto in the 14th round, eventually leading the club out of the relegation zone and coaching the team until the end of the 1999–2000 campaign, which ended in relegation.

After half a season at C.F. Estrela da Amadora and one year out of football, he returned to Rio Ave, helping it return to the top level. In summer 2005, after two further campaigns, Brito signed with another former team, Boavista, leading them to a final sixth position in the league and narrowly missing out on qualification to the UEFA Cup.

In 2007–08, Brito worked with Leixões SC, being fired near the end of the season, with the Matosinhos side finally avoiding relegation. In January 2009 he replaced João Eusébio at Rio Ave, thus returning for a third stint as a manager.

Brito was fired at the end of the 2011–12 campaign after Rio Ave could only rank in 14th position, even though it was enough to preserve top division status. In March 2015, he returned to active with F.C. Penafiel, last-placed in the second tier. He kept the club from relegation, and quit his job on 2 December.

Brito was back in the same league on 16 February 2016, when he signed for sixth-placed S.C. Freamunde for the rest of the season. He left by mutual consent on 25 October that year, with the team second from bottom after 12 fixtures.
