= Manuel Machado (football manager) =

Portuguese football manager

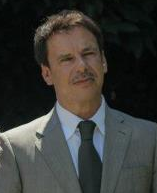
- Machado in 2012

Personal information
- Full name: Manuel António Marques Machado
- Date of birth: 4 December 1955 (age 70)
- Place of birth: Oliveira, Portugal

Managerial career
- Years: Team
- 1992–1993: Vitória Guimarães (youth)
- 1993: Vila Real
- 1995–1996: Vitória Guimarães (caretaker)
- 1998–2000: Fafe
- 2000–2004: Moreirense
- 2004–2005: Vitória Guimarães
- 2005–2006: Nacional
- 2006–2007: Académica
- 2007–2008: Braga
- 2008–2009: Nacional
- 2010: Nacional
- 2010–2011: Vitória Guimarães
- 2012: Aris
- 2012–2016: Nacional
- 2017: Arouca
- 2017: Moreirense
- 2020–2021: Berço
- 2021: Nacional

Manuel António Marques Machado (born 4 December 1955) is a Portuguese football manager.

In a career of nearly three decades, he was most associated with Nacional, whom he led in five spells and always in the Primeira Liga. In the top flight he was also in charge of Vitória de Guimarães (three spells), Moreirense (twice), Académica, Braga and Arouca. Abroad, he had a brief spell at Aris in Super League Greece.

== Football career ==
=== Early career ===
Born in the village of Oliveira, in Guimarães, Machado started his career with his local Vitória de Guimarães' youths, having a head coach spell with lowly S.C. Vila Real in between. After two years with another modest club in the north, AD Fafe, he moved to another side in his region, Moreirense F.C. in 2000, helping to promotion from the third division to the Primeira Liga in just two years.

Machado coached the team from Moreira de Cónegos to a comfortable 12th position in their debut season, and ninth the following campaign, after which he returned to Guimarães. His first game on 29 August 2004 was a goalless draw away to his former employers, eventually finishing fifth and qualifying for the UEFA Cup.

=== First Nacional spell, Académica and Braga ===
Machado signed for C.D. Nacional subsequently, helping the Madeirans to finish fifth, with qualification for the UEFA Cup. He left in May 2006 as his wife and children were staying in mainland Portugal, signing for Académica de Coimbra. After a 13th-place finish in his one full season, he left by mutual consent on 10 September 2007 having taken one point from the first three games.

On 7 November 2007, Machado was hired at S.C. Braga, succeeding Jorge Costa at the 8th-placed team. He resigned the following 22 April, with the team practically out of the running for European places with three games to go.

=== Nacional and Guimarães returns ===
Machado rejoined Nacional for 2008–09, equalling the club's best-ever finish as fourth. However, on 13 December 2009, he announced he would leave the benches for a period, after surgery-related complications; he was replaced by assistant Predrag Jokanović, and eventually left his post at the end of the campaign, replaced by precisely the Serbian.

On 2 June 2010, Machado returned to Vitória Guimarães, taking the Minho team to the final of the Taça de Portugal in his first season. On 26 August 2011, he left the Estádio D. Afonso Henriques after Europa League elimination at the hands of Atlético Madrid (6–0 on aggregate, 4–0 home loss in the second game).

On 17 January 2012, Machado signed for the only foreign job of his entire career, at Aris Thessaloniki F.C. of Super League Greece. He signed for the 10th-placed club for the rest of the season.

Machado signed with Nacional for a third spell on 13 October 2012, replacing the fired Pedro Caixinha. A contract termination by mutual consent was reached on 28 December 2016, as the team ranked third-bottom in the league and tied for points with the first side inside the relegation zone, having also been ousted from the Portuguese Cup. He was also relieved of his duties at F.C. Arouca on 21 March 2017, becoming the first manager to be fired by two teams in the season, as both eventually dropped down a tier.

=== Later career ===
On 27 May 2017, Machado signed a one-year contract with former club Moreirense. On 29 October, as they were placed second from the bottom in the top division, he was dismissed.

In April 2020, Machado was named as manager of local third tier club Berço SC for the upcoming season. Eleven months later, he activated a clause allowing him to move freely to a top-flight club, and returned to relegation-threatened Nacional.

== Managerial statistics ==
As of 25 July 2021

Managerial record by team and tenure
Team	Nat	From	To	Record							
Team	Nat	From	To	G	W	D	L	GF	GA	GD	Win %
Vila Real	(Portugal)	6 June 1993	22 November 1993	13	4	5	4	15	11	+4	30.77
Vitória Guimarães (caretaker)	(Portugal)	18 December 1995	14 January 1996	5	2	1	2	7	5	+2	40.00
Fafe	(Portugal)	26 June 1998	2 July 2000	78	35	23	20	138	93	+45	44.87
Moreirense	(Portugal)	2 July 2000	7 June 2004	155	73	38	44	230	168	+62	47.10
Vitória Guimarães	(Portugal)	8 June 2004	23 May 2005	37	17	9	11	43	33	+10	45.95
Nacional	(Portugal)	2 July 2005	9 May 2006	37	15	12	10	43	33	+10	40.54
Académica	(Portugal)	15 May 2006	10 September 2007	38	9	9	20	36	58	−22	23.68
Braga	(Portugal)	12 November 2007	21 April 2008	24	6	10	8	24	30	−6	25.00
Nacional	(Portugal)	21 May 2008	29 November 2009	60	28	16	16	93	74	+19	46.67
Nacional	(Portugal)	26 January 2010	16 May 2010	14	3	6	5	12	17	−5	21.43
Vitória Guimarães	(Portugal)	24 May 2010	26 August 2011	46	19	9	18	55	59	−4	41.30
Aris	(Greece)	16 January 2012	30 June 2012	14	6	4	4	17	19	−2	42.86
Nacional	(Portugal)	12 October 2012	28 December 2016	168	57	42	69	222	234	−12	33.93
Arouca	(Portugal)	11 February 2017	21 March 2017	5	0	0	5	3	14	−11	0.00
Moreirense	(Portugal)	27 May 2017	29 October 2017	13	3	4	6	10	19	−9	23.08
Berço	(Portugal)	1 July 2020	22 March 2021	17	6	5	6	23	22	+1	35.29
Nacional	(Portugal)	22 March 2021	22 May 2021	11	1	1	9	9	27	−18	9.09
Total				735	284	194	257	980	916	+64	38.64

== Honours ==
Moreirense

- Segunda Liga: 2001–02
- Segunda Divisão: 2000–01

Vitória Guimarães

- Taça de Portugal runner-up: 2010–11
- Supertaça Cândido de Oliveira runner-up: 2011
