= 2006–07 Liga de Honra =

73rd season of second-tier football league in Portugal

Liga de Honra
- Season: 2006–07
- Champions: Leixões
- Promoted: Leixões; Vitória de Guimarães
- Relegated: Olivais e Moscavide; Chaves

The 2006–07 Liga de Honra season was the 17th season of the competition and the 73rd season of recognised second-tier football in Portugal.

== Promoted and relegated teams ==
These teams were relegated from the Liga betandwin.com at the start of the season:

- Gil Vicente (12th placed, instead of 15th placed Belenenses due to the use of a footballer – Mateus Galiano da Costa – who had played with the status of amateur and professional in the same year)
- Rio Ave (16th placed)
- Vitória de Guimarães (17th placed)
- Penafiel (18th placed)

These teams were promoted from the Second Division at the start of the season:

- Olivais e Moscavide (champions)
- Trofense (runners-up)

== Final standings ==
| Pos | Team | Pld | W | D | L | GF | GA | GD | Pts | Promotion or relegation |
|---|---|---|---|---|---|---|---|---|---|---|
| 1 | Leixões (C, P) | 30 | 18 | 6 | 6 | 45 | 21 | +24 | 60 | Promotion to Primeira Liga |
| 2 | Vitória de Guimarães (P) | 30 | 16 | 7 | 7 | 44 | 20 | +24 | 55 | Promotion to Primeira Liga |
| 3 | Rio Ave | 30 | 15 | 8 | 7 | 44 | 37 | +7 | 53 | |
| 4 | Santa Clara | 30 | 15 | 5 | 10 | 34 | 31 | +3 | 50 | |
| 5 | Gondomar | 30 | 13 | 6 | 11 | 33 | 30 | +3 | 45 | |
| 6 | Feirense | 30 | 11 | 11 | 8 | 38 | 26 | +12 | 44 | |
| 7 | Varzim | 30 | 12 | 8 | 10 | 34 | 37 | −3 | 44 | |
| 8 | Penafiel | 30 | 10 | 11 | 9 | 23 | 27 | −4 | 41 | |
| 9 | Olhanense | 30 | 10 | 10 | 10 | 29 | 31 | −2 | 40 | |
| 10 | Estoril | 30 | 10 | 7 | 13 | 30 | 35 | −5 | 37 | |
| 11 | Trofense | 30 | 9 | 9 | 12 | 27 | 26 | +1 | 36 | |
| 12 | Gil Vicente (Note: Gil Vicente's nine points are deducted.) | 30 | 12 | 9 | 9 | 27 | 27 | 0 | 36 | |
| 13 | Vizela | 30 | 9 | 7 | 14 | 29 | 32 | −3 | 34 | |
| 14 | Portimonense | 30 | 7 | 9 | 14 | 28 | 42 | −14 | 30 | |
| 15 | Olivais e Moscavide (R) | 30 | 7 | 6 | 17 | 26 | 42 | −16 | 27 | Relegation to Segunda Divisão |
| 16 | Chaves (R) | 30 | 3 | 7 | 20 | 16 | 43 | −27 | 16 | Relegation to Segunda Divisão |

(C) Champions; (P) Promoted; (R) Relegated

== Results ==
| Home \ Away | CHA | EST | FEI | GVI | GON | LEI | OLH | OLM | PEN | PTM | RAV | STC | TRO | VAR | VGU | VIZ |
|---|---|---|---|---|---|---|---|---|---|---|---|---|---|---|---|---|
| Chaves | | 0–1 | 1–1 | 0–1 | 2–3 | 0–1 | 0–1 | 1–0 | 0–0 | 1–2 | 1–1 | 0–4 | 2–1 | 1–3 | 0–1 | 1–1 |
| Estoril | 1–1 | | 2–2 | 3–0 | 2–1 | 1–0 | 1–2 | 1–1 | 2–1 | 1–0 | 1–2 | 0–1 | 1–2 | 2–1 | 1–1 | 2–0 |
| Feirense | 1–0 | 1–0 | | 1–2 | 0–0 | 1–1 | 3–0 | 1–0 | 0–0 | 2–0 | 4–1 | 3–0 | 1–2 | 2–2 | 0–0 | 0–2 |
| Gil Vicente | 1–0 | 0–0 | 0–3 | | 3–0 | 1–0 | 0–0 | 1–0 | 2–0 | 0–0 | 1–2 | 2–1 | 0–3 | 2–2 | 1–1 | 2–1 |
| Gondomar | 3–0 | 3–0 | 1–0 | 1–0 | | 1–2 | 1–1 | 0–1 | 2–1 | 2–0 | 0–0 | 1–1 | 1–0 | 0–1 | 0–2 | 1–2 |
| Leixões | 3–0 | 1–0 | 1–1 | 2–1 | 2–0 | | 0–1 | 4–0 | 2–0 | 0–0 | 0–0 | 3–1 | 1–0 | 4–0 | 0–2 | 2–0 |
| Olhanense | 2–1 | 3–1 | 2–3 | 0–0 | 0–0 | 1–2 | | 2–1 | 1–1 | 1–4 | 2–0 | 1–2 | 1–1 | 1–1 | 1–0 | 2–1 |
| Olivais e Moscavide | 4–1 | 3–1 | 1–3 | 1–2 | 0–1 | 1–2 | 0–0 | | 1–2 | 1–1 | 1–3 | 0–1 | 0–2 | 2–1 | 2–1 | 0–0 |
| Penafiel | 0–0 | 0–0 | 1–0 | 1–1 | 2–1 | 3–0 | 2–1 | 0–0 | | 1–0 | 2–0 | 1–0 | 0–3 | 2–1 | 0–2 | 1–4 |
| Portimonense | 1–0 | 0–1 | 0–0 | 1–1 | 1–2 | 1–4 | 1–0 | 1–1 | 1–1 | | 1–3 | 0–1 | 1–1 | 1–2 | 1–3 | 0–0 |
| Rio Ave | 3–2 | 1–0 | 2–1 | 1–0 | 1–3 | 1–2 | 1–1 | 2–1 | 1–0 | 1–2 | | 2–0 | 2–1 | 0–0 | 5–3 | 2–1 |
| Santa Clara | 0–0 | 1–1 | 2–1 | 2–1 | 2–1 | 0–2 | 1–0 | 2–1 | 0–0 | 2–1 | 3–3 | | 1–0 | 0–1 | 0–1 | 2–1 |
| Trofense | 1–0 | 1–0 | 1–1 | 0–1 | 2–2 | 1–0 | 0–1 | 0–1 | 0–0 | 1–3 | 0–0 | 0–1 | | 2–0 | 0–1 | 1–1 |
| Varzim | 0–1 | 2–1 | 0–1 | 0–0 | 2–0 | 1–1 | 1–0 | 1–0 | 2–0 | 2–4 | 0–3 | 1–3 | 1–1 | | 2–1 | 3–2 |
| Vitória de Guimarães | 1–0 | 3–1 | 1–1 | 1–0 | 0–1 | 0–0 | 1–1 | 4–0 | 0–1 | 6–0 | 3–0 | 1–0 | 2–0 | 0–0 | | 2–0 |
| Vizela | 1–0 | 1–2 | 1–0 | 0–1 | 0–1 | 2–3 | 1–0 | 1–2 | 0–0 | 1–0 | 1–1 | 2–0 | 0–0 | 0–1 | 2–0 | |

Legend: Blue = home team win; Yellow = draw; Red = away team win.
