= Ulisses Morais =

Portuguese football manager and former player

Personal information
- Full name: Ulisses Manuel Nogueira Morais
- Date of birth: 22 November 1959 (age 66)
- Place of birth: Almoster, Portugal
- Position: Forward

Youth career
- 1976–1977: Benfica

Senior career*
Years	Team	Apps	(Gls)
1977–1978	União Montemor		
1978–1979	Covilhã		
1979–1980	Bragança	17	(2)
1980–1981	Mogadourense		
1981–1982	Guarda	22	(2)
1982–1983	União Tomar		
1983–1986	Benfica Castelo Branco		
1986–1987	Ermesinde		
1987–1988	O Elvas	3	(0)
1988–1989	Varzim	7	(0)
1989–1990	Peniche	33	(1)
1990–1992	Mirense	69	(0)
1992–1993	Leiria Marrazes		
1993–1995	Covilhã	29	(0)

Managerial career
- 1996–1997: Naval
- 1997–2000: Dragões Sandinenses
- 2000–2001: Machico
- 2001–2004: Estoril
- 2004–2006: Gil Vicente
- 2006–2007: Marítimo
- 2007–2009: Naval
- 2009–2010: Paços Ferreira
- 2011: Académica
- 2012–2013: Beira-Mar
- 2015–2016: Aves
- 2016: Famalicão
- 2017–2018: Johor Darul Ta'zim
- * Club domestic league appearances and goals

Ulisses Manuel Nogueira Morais (born 22 November 1959) is a Portuguese former footballer who played as a forward, currently a manager.

== Playing career ==
Born in the village of Almoster, Santarém, Morais played for 18 years as a senior but only eight at the professional level. He represented S.C. Covilhã, GD Bragança, U.D. Guarda, Sport Benfica e Castelo Branco, Varzim S.C. and G.D. Peniche in the second division, and O Elvas C.A.D. in the Primeira Liga.

With the latter club, Morais appeared in three games in the 1987–88 season as they finished in 15th position out of 20 teams but still suffered relegation. He retired in late 1995, at the age of 36.

== Managerial career ==
Morais started working as a manager a year after retiring, his first eight years being spent in the third division or lower. From 2002 to 2004, he led G.D. Estoril Praia to two consecutive promotions all the way to the top flight; after the latter conquest, he completed his UEFA coaching degree, level III.

From there onwards, Morais coached solely in the top tier, with Gil Vicente FC, C.S. Marítimo, Associação Naval 1º de Maio, F.C. Paços de Ferreira, Académica de Coimbra and S.C. Beira-Mar. He was dismissed by the third club on 7 September 2009 due to poor results, and only suffered relegation with the first due to irregularities, as he led Gil to the 12th place in the 2005–06 campaign.

On 5 September 2015, Morais dropped down to division two for the first time in over a decade, taking over C.D. Aves on a two-year deal after a poor start under Abel Xavier left the team second-bottom. After an eighth-place finish, he was let go of with a year remaining. He signed for F.C. Famalicão at the same level days later, and quit on 11 October 2016 with the side in 18th, taking nine points from ten games.

Morais moved abroad for the first time in June 2017, succeeding Benjamin Mora at the helm of Malaysian champions Johor Darul Ta'zim FC. After winning the Super League, Cup and Charity Shield, he left on 26 February 2018 due to a family health emergency.

== Managerial statistics ==
As of 25 February 2018

Managerial record by team and tenure
Team	Nat.	From	To	Record					Ref.
Team	Nat.	From	To	G	W	D	L	Win %	Ref.
Naval	(Portugal)	15 January 1996	2 June 1997	53	29	14	10	54.72	
Dragões Sandinenses	(Portugal)	2 June 1997	20 June 2000	119	63	31	25	52.94	
Machico	(Portugal)	20 June 2000	5 November 2001	51	21	14	16	41.18	
Estoril	(Portugal)	27 November 2001	11 May 2004	107	64	20	23	59.81	
Gil Vicente	(Portugal)	28 October 2004	7 March 2006	54	18	10	26	33.33	
Marítimo	(Portugal)	16 March 2006	7 April 2007	33	11	10	12	33.33	
Naval	(Portugal)	4 October 2007	7 September 2009	68	23	15	30	33.82	
Paços Ferreira	(Portugal)	19 October 2009	20 May 2010	27	9	8	10	33.33	
Académica	(Portugal)	23 February 2011	17 May 2011	11	2	5	4	18.18	
Beira-Mar	(Portugal)	27 February 2012	16 February 2013	37	9	10	18	24.32	
Aves	(Portugal)	5 September 2015	17 May 2016	45	21	10	14	46.67	
Famalicão	(Portugal)	27 May 2016	11 October 2016	12	3	3	6	25.00	
Johor Darul Ta'zim	(Malaysia)	19 June 2017	25 February 2018	26	17	4	5	65.38	
Career Total				643	290	154	199	45.10	
