= 2012–13 Segunda Liga =

23rd season of second-tier football league in Portugal

Segunda Liga
- Season: 2012–13
- Champions: Belenenses
- Promoted: Belenenses; Arouca
- Relegated: Naval 1º de Maio; Vitória de Guimarães B Freamunde
- Matches: 462
- Goals: 1,125 (2.44 per match)
- Top goalscorer: Joeano (26 goals)
- Best goalkeeper: Matt Jones
- Biggest home win: Benfica B 6–0 Belenenses
- Biggest away win: Penafiel 0–3 Arouca; Santa Clara 1–4 Belenenses
- Highest scoring: Feirense 2–4 Benfica B Benfica B 6–0 Belenenses; Freamunde 3–3 Belenenses

The 2012–13 Segunda Liga was the 23rd season of the second-tier of football in Portugal. This season marked a series of changes in the league overall. The league's name was changed back to Segunda Liga from the previous Liga de Honra. A total of 22 teams contested the league, up from 16 in the previous season; 14 of which contested the 2011–12 season, two of which were promoted from the Portuguese Second Division (including a reserve team), one of which was relegated from the 2011–12 Primeira Liga, and five of which were new reserve teams of Primeira Liga clubs. The reserve teams were not eligible for promotion to the Primeira Liga.

== Events ==
União de Leiria were relegated to the second division due to not fulfilling the mandatory requirements by the Portuguese League for Professional Football regarding the application process to professional competitions. Thus, Sporting Covilhã was invited to stay in the Segunda Liga despite being relegated in the previous season.

Varzim, the 2011–12 Segunda Divisão champions, also did not fulfill the requirements and were not registered in the Segunda Liga. Again, Portimonense were invited to remain in the Segunda Liga.

== Teams ==
Location of teams in Liga de Honra 2012–13
Location of teams in Liga de Honra 2012–13
Location of teams in Liga de Honra 2012–13

=== Changes in 2012–13 ===
Teams relegated from 2011–12 Primeira Liga

- 15th Place: Feirense

Teams promoted to 2012–13 Primeira Liga

- Champions: Estoril
- Runners-up: Moreirense

Teams promoted from 2011–12 Portuguese Second Division

- Runners-up: Tondela
- 12th place (Serie C): Marítimo B

New teams entering directly to the 2012–13 Segunda Liga

- Benfica B
- Braga B
- Porto B
- Sporting CP B
- Vitória de Guimarães B

=== Stadia and locations ===
Club	City	Stadium	Capacity	2011–12
Arouca	Arouca	Estádio Municipal de Arouca	2,500	13th
Atlético CP	Lisbon	Estádio da Tapadinha	15,000	11th
Belenenses	Lisbon	Estádio do Restelo	19,856	5th
Benfica B	Lisbon	Estádio da Luz	65,647	N/A
Braga B	Braga	Estádio 1º de Maio	28,000	N/A
Desportivo das Aves	Vila das Aves	Estádio do CD das Aves	5,441	3rd
Feirense	Santa Maria da Feira	Estádio Marcolino de Castro	5,600	15th (Primeira Liga)
Freamunde	Freamunde	Complexo Desportivo do SC Freamunde	5,000	14th
Leixões	Matosinhos	Estádio do Mar	9,766	6th
Marítimo B	Funchal	Campo da Imaculada Conceição	3,000	12th (Segunda Divisão - Norte)
Naval	Figueira da Foz	Estádio José Bento Pessoa	12,630	4th
Oliveirense	Oliveira de Azeméis	Estádio Carlos Osório	9,100	7th
Penafiel	Penafiel	Estádio Municipal 25 de Abril	5,320	9th
Portimonense	Portimão	Estádio Municipal de Portimão	5,950	16th
Porto B	Porto	Estádio Municipal Jorge Sampaio	8,270	N/A
Santa Clara	Ponta Delgada	Estádio de São Miguel	13,277	12th
Sporting CP B	Lisbon	Estádio Municipal de Rio Maior	3,000	N/A
Sporting Covilhã	Covilhã	Complexo Desportivo da Covilhã	3,000	15th
Tondela	Tondela	Estádio João Cardoso	2,600	2nd (Segunda Divisão)
Trofense	Trofa	Estádio do Clube Desportivo Trofense	3,164	8th
União da Madeira	Funchal	Estádio da Madeira	5,200	10th
Vitória de Guimarães B	Guimarães	Estádio D. Afonso Henriques	30,000	N/A

=== Personnel and kits ===
Note: Flags indicate national team as has been defined under FIFA eligibility rules. Players and Managers may hold more than one non-FIFA nationality.

Team	Head coach	Captain	Kit manufacturer	Shirt sponsor
Arouca	(Portugal) Vítor Oliveira	(Portugal) Gabi	Joma	Cavadinha
Atlético	(Portugal) Toni Pereira		Joma	Hyundai / Banif / Betclic
Belenenses	(Netherlands) Mitchell van der Gaag	(Portugal) Duarte Machado	Adidas	MetLife
Benfica B	(Portugal) Luís Norton de Matos	(Portugal) Miguel Rosa	adidas	meo (H) / tmn (A)
Braga B	(Portugal) Toni	(Portugal) Mário Palmeira	Macron	AXA
Desportivo das Aves	(Portugal) Professor Neca	(Portugal) Leandro	Lacatoni	
Feirense	(Portugal) Quim Machado	(Brazil) Luciano	Adidas	ASLO / VITO / U-BOX
Freamunde	(Portugal) João Eusébio	(Portugal) Bock	Joma	Capão À Freamunde
Leixões	(Portugal) Pedro Correia	(Portugal) Nuno Silva	SportZone	BetClic / Soltráfego / SmileUp
Marítimo B	(Portugal) Ivo Vieira	(Portugal) Romeu Ribeiro	Lacatoni	Banif
Naval	(Portugal) Filó		Desportreino	Algarve Sol Hoteis / BetClic / Polar Viagens
Oliveirense	(Portugal) João de Deus	(Portugal) Laranjeira	Macron	BetClic / Caçarola / Grupo Simoldes
Penafiel	(Portugal) Miguel Leal	(Portugal) Hélder Ferreira	Desportreino	Sentir Penafiel
Portimonense	(Angola) Lázaro Oliveira		Macron	Visit Portimão
Porto B	(Portugal) Rui Gomes	(Portugal) Tiago Ferreira	Nike	meo (H) / tmn (A)
Santa Clara	(Portugal) Luís Miguel	(Canada) Pedro Pacheco	Lacatoni	Açoreana Seguros
Sporting B	(Portugal) José Dominguez	(Portugal) Pedro Mendes	Puma	tmn (H) / meo (A)
Sporting Covilhã	(Portugal) Fanã	(Portugal) Edgar	Desportreino	Natura IMB Hotels
Tondela	(Portugal) Vítor Paneira	(Portugal) Márcio Sousa	Macron	Centro Litoral, OP
Trofense	(Portugal) Micael Sequeira	(Portugal) Tiago	Lacatoni	Trofa Saúde
União da Madeira	(Serbia) Predrag Jokanovic		Macron	Turismo da Madeira
Vitória de Guimarães B	(Brazil) Luíz Felipe	(Portugal) Bruno Alves	Lacatoni	Espaço Guimarães / Smile.Up / Super Bock

=== Managerial changes ===
Team	Outgoing manager	Manner of departure	Date of vacancy	Replaced by	Date of appointment	Position in table
Feirense	(Portugal) Henrique Nunes	Resigned	23 August 2012	(Portugal) Bruno Moura	24 August 2012	22nd
Feirense	(Portugal) Bruno Moura	Resigned	27 September 2012	(Portugal) Quim Machado	27 September 2012	22nd
Freamunde	(Portugal) Nuno Sousa	Sacked	1 October 2012	(Portugal) João Eusébio	2 October 2012	22nd
Sporting CP B	(Portugal) Oceano da Cruz	Took over Sporting's first team	5 October 2012	(Portugal) José Dominguez	5 October 2012	2nd
Braga B	(Portugal) Artur Jorge	Resigned	16 October 2012	(Portugal) Toni Conceição	16 October 2012	21st
Sporting Covilhã	(Portugal) Filipe Moreira	Resigned	13 November 2012	(Portugal) Fanã	19 November 2012	18th
Leixões	(Portugal) Horácio Gonçalves	Resigned	6 November 2012	(Portugal) Pedro Correia	6 November 2012	10th
Trofense	(Portugal) Professor Neca	Sacked	6 December 2012	(Portugal) Micael Sequeira	14 December 2012	19th
Marítimo B	(Portugal) José Barros	Resigned	14 January 2013	(Portugal) Ivo Vieira	19 January 2013	18th
Desportivo das Aves	(Portugal) José Vilaça	Resigned	18 February 2013	(Portugal) Professor Neca	18 February 2013	7th
Freamunde	(Portugal) João Eusébio	Mutual agreement	25 February 2013	(Portugal) Jorge Regadas	25 February 2013	22nd
Sporting Covilhã	(Portugal) Fanã	Resigned	26 February 2013	(Portugal) Francisco Chaló	26 February 2013	19th
Vitória de Guimarães B	(Brazil) Luiz Felipe	Resigned	9 April 2013	(Portugal) Armando Evangelista	11 April 2013	22nd
Santa Clara	(Portugal) Luís Miguel	Sacked	11 May 2013	(Portugal) Cândido Rêgo (Caretaker) (Portugal) Samuel Correia (Caretaker)	11 May 2013	9th

== League table ==
Pos	Team	Pld	W	D	L	GF	GA	GD	Pts	Promotion or relegation
1	Belenenses (C, P)	42	29	7	6	75	41	+34	94	Promotion to Primeira Liga
2	Arouca (P)	42	21	10	11	65	48	+17	73	Promotion to Primeira Liga
3	Leixões	42	18	14	10	49	36	+13	68	
4	Sporting CP B	42	17	15	10	62	46	+16	66	Ineligible for promotion
5	Desportivo das Aves	42	16	17	9	47	42	+5	65	
6	Portimonense	42	17	13	12	61	50	+11	64	
7	Benfica B	42	15	17	10	71	54	+17	62	Ineligible for promotion
8	Oliveirense	42	16	12	14	52	49	+3	60 (Note: OLI 0–0 PEN; PEN 0–1 OLI)	
9	Penafiel	42	16	12	14	48	44	+4	60	
10	Tondela	42	16	11	15	55	60	−5	59 (Note: TON 4–2 STC; STC 0–0 TON)	
11	Santa Clara	42	15	14	13	55	48	+7	59	
12	União da Madeira	42	13	17	12	47	46	+1	56 (Note: CFU 3–0 FEI; FEI 3–1 CFU)	
13	Feirense	42	15	11	16	60	59	+1	56	
14	Porto B	42	13	15	14	49	49	0	54	Ineligible for promotion
15	Braga B	42	12	13	17	39	51	−12	47 (Note: Braga B were deducted 2 points due to misuse of players.)	Ineligible for promotion
16	Marítimo B	42	14	7	21	40	46	−6	46 (Note: Marítimo B were deducted 3 points due to misuse of players.)	Ineligible for promotion
17	Atlético CP	42	12	8	22	45	63	−18	44	
18	Naval 1º de Maio (R)	42	13	18	11	51	50	+1	40 (Note: Naval were deducted 17 points due to debts to two other clubs. They also declined to play in the Segunda Liga in the 2013–14 season.)	Relegation to Campeonato Nacional de Seniores
19	Trofense	42	9	13	20	41	60	−19	40	
20	Sporting da Covilhã	42	7	17	18	37	52	−15	38	
21	Vitória de Guimarães B (R)	42	7	15	20	30	56	−26	36	Relegation to Campeonato Nacional de Seniores
22	Freamunde (R)	42	7	12	23	46	75	−29	33	Relegation to Campeonato Nacional de Seniores

Source: Segunda Liga
Rules for classification: 1) points; 2) head-to-head points; 3) head-to-head goal difference; 4) head-to-head goals scored; 5) goal difference; 6) number of goals scored.
(C) Champions; (P) Promoted; (R) Relegated

=== Positions by round ===
Team ╲ Round	1	2	3	4	5	6	7	8	9	10	11	12	13	14	15	16	17	18	19	20	21	22	23	24	25	26	27	28	29	30	31	32	33	34	35	36	37	38	39	40	41	42
Belenenses	2	1	1	4	2	2	1	1	2	2	2	2	2	2	2	2	1	1	1	1	1	1	1	1	1	1	1	1	1	1	1	1	1	1	1	1	1	1	1	1	1	1
Arouca	1	3	2	1	3	5	6	5	8	6	4	3	3	4	3	4	3	4	6	6	4	3	3	3	3	3	3	2	3	2	2	2	2	2	2	2	2	2	2	2	2	2
Leixões	7	10	6	3	6	10	9	9	9	10	10	10	11	13	10	11	11	13	14	12	13	9	9	9	6	6	5	5	4	4	4	4	3	3	3	3	3	3	3	3	3	3
Sporting CP B	17	10	5	2	1	1	3	2	1	1	1	1	1	1	1	1	2	2	2	2	2	2	2	2	2	2	2	3	2	3	3	3	4	7	8	5	4	4	5	4	4	4
Desportivo das Aves	4	4	8	5	7	7	11	7	6	7	9	6	7	8	5	5	5	5	3	3	3	4	4	4	4	5	6	7	5	7	9	7	5	5	7	7	7	8	7	5	5	5
Portimonense	20	21	21	14	10	8	8	11	11	11	11	11	9	9	13	10	12	11	11	9	9	11	11	13	11	10	8	12	10	9	12	12	10	11	9	9	9	5	4	6	7	6
Benfica B	9	2	9	7	4	4	4	4	5	4	7	8	5	3	4	3	4	3	4	4	5	5	6	6	12	7	10	8	11	13	10	8	6	6	5	6	6	7	6	7	6	7
Oliveirense	8	6	4	8	5	3	2	3	3	3	3	4	4	5	6	8	6	8	8	10	10	10	10	10	7	11	7	6	8	6	6	6	8	8	4	4	5	6	9	8	8	8
Penafiel	5	9	16	11	12	9	5	6	4	8	6	7	8	11	14	15	16	17	16	15	14	13	12	12	9	12	9	11	9	12	8	10	9	10	10	10	10	10	10	11	10	9
Tondela	12	5	11	12	8	12	7	10	10	9	8	9	10	6	7	9	9	9	9	8	8	8	8	8	5	4	4	4	6	10	13	13	13	14	13	12	11	11	12	10	11	10
Santa Clara	3	12	15	16	16	13	13	13	13	14	16	14	13	12	9	7	8	6	7	7	7	6	5	5	8	9	12	10	7	5	5	5	7	4	6	8	8	9	8	9	9	11
União da Madeira	6	6	3	6	9	6	10	12	12	12	13	12	12	10	8	6	7	7	5	5	6	7	7	7	10	13	13	14	13	11	11	11	12	12	12	13	13	13	11	12	14	12
Feirense	18	22	22	22	22	22	21	20	20	18	19	20	20	19	18	16	17	16	13	14	16	15	14	14	15	15	15	15	15	15	15	15	15	16	14	15	15	14	14	14	12	13
Porto B	11	15	13	17	19	19	17	17	18	20	20	18	19	16	15	14	10	12	12	13	12	14	13	11	13	8	11	9	12	8	7	9	11	9	11	11	12	12	13	13	13	14
Marítimo B	16	8	14	9	13	11	12	8	7	5	5	5	6	7	11	13	14	15	17	17	17	18	19	19	18	17	17	17	17	17	16	16	17	17	16	18	18	18	18	18	16	15
Braga B	10	15	18	18	18	18	20	19	19	21	21	21	21	21	21	20	19	20	19	19	19	19	17	19	18	19	19	18	18	18	18	18	18	18	17	16	17	17	16	15	15	16
Atlético CP	21	14	17	19	20	20	18	18	16	17	15	17	14	14	12	12	13	14	15	16	15	16	16	16	16	16	16	16	16	16	17	17	16	15	15	14	14	15	15	16	17	17
Naval 1º de Maio	19	19	12	13	17	17	19	21	21	19	18	16	17	17	16	17	15	10	10	11	11	12	15	15	14	14	14	13	14	14	14	14	14	13	18	17	16	16	17	17	16	18
Trofense	22	13	7	10	11	14	14	14	15	15	17	19	16	18	19	19	21	21	21	22	22	21	22	22	21	21	21	20	20	19	19	19	19	19	19	19	19	19	19	19	19	19
Sporting da Covilhã	13	17	18	20	14	16	16	16	17	16	14	15	18	20	20	21	20	19	20	20	20	17	17	18	19	19	19	19	19	20	20	20	20	20	20	20	20	20	20	20	20	20
Vitória de Guimarães B	14	18	10	15	15	15	15	15	14	13	11	13	15	15	17	18	18	18	18	18	18	20	19	20	20	20	20	21	19	21	21	21	21	22	20	21	21	21	21	21	21	21
Freamunde	15	20	20	21	21	21	22	22	22	22	22	22	22	22	22	22	22	22	22	21	21	21	21	21	22	22	22	22	22	22	22	22	22	21	22	22	22	22	22	22	22	22

Leader/Promoted
2nd place/Promoted

Source: LPFP.pt (in Portuguese)

== Results ==
Home \ Away	ARO	ACP	BEL	BEN	BRA	DAV	FEI	FRM	LEI	MAR	NAV	OLI	PEN	PTM	POR	STC	SCP	SCO	TON	TRO	UNI	VGU
Arouca		2–0	0–3	3–1	2–0	1–1	1–0	3–2	2–0	3–1	1–1	2–1	0–0	2–0	0–0	2–0	1–2	3–0	3–1	1–0	3–0	3–0
Atlético CP	1–1		2–4	1–0	1–2	0–2	2–1	2–2	1–0	2–1	0–2	1–2	0–1	3–2	2–1	2–0	1–3	0–0	0–1	2–1	0–1	3–1
Belenenses	1–2	2–1		2–1	1–0	1–0	3–1	2–1	2–1	1–0	1–0	0–2	2–0	1–0	2–1	0–0	2–1	2–0	4–0	2–0	2–1	4–1
Benfica B	1–1	1–1	6–0		2–2	2–1	1–3	0–1	0–0	3–1	2–2	2–2	4–1	1–1	1–1	2–2	1–3	2–1	2–2	1–0	4–1	2–1
Braga B	3–1	0–1	0–0	0–0		1–2	1–0	0–2	1–0	0–0	0–0	2–2	3–1	1–2	1–1	1–0	0–0	2–1	0–3	2–0	1–1	0–0
Desportivo das Aves	0–3	2–1	2–1	0–2	2–0		3–3	0–0	0–0	0–2	1–0	2–1	2–2	0–0	2–2	0–0	1–1	1–0	0–2	2–0	1–1	1–0
Feirense	5–0	2–3	2–2	2–4	3–0	0–0		3–1	2–2	1–0	0–0	1–2	0–0	3–3	1–0	2–2	0–3	1–0	2–1	1–1	3–1	2–0
Freamunde	0–1	3–2	3–3	0–0	1–3	2–2	3–2		0–2	2–0	1–3	1–3	1–3	1–3	0–3	2–2	0–2	1–1	0–1	4–2	1–1	1–1
Leixões	1–0	2–0	1–1	1–0	1–1	1–0	1–0	2–2		1–0	4–3	3–0	1–1	3–1	2–1	1–0	1–3	0–1	0–0	2–1	1–0	0–2
Marítimo B	3–0	1–1	1–1	1–1	0–1	0–0	1–3	1–0	0–3		2–3	0–0	2–0	1–0	1–0	0–1	0–0	2–0	4–1	3–0	1–3	2–0
Naval 1º de Maio	2–0	2–2	0–0	2–1	0–2	1–2	2–0	2–2	0–0	2–1		1–0	1–0	1–1	0–0	1–3	1–0	3–3	2–1	0–0	0–1	2–1
Oliveirense	3–2	4–2	0–1	1–2	2–1	1–2	2–0	1–0	0–2	1–0	2–2		0–0	1–0	3–0	2–3	1–0	3–2	1–3	0–0	1–0	0–0
Penafiel	0–3	2–0	2–0	2–1	2–0	0–1	2–1	1–0	1–1	2–0	2–0	0–1		1–1	2–0	1–2	2–1	2–0	1–1	1–1	0–1	4–0
Portimonense	1–3	2–1	1–2	3–3	1–0	1–0	2–1	3–0	1–1	2–1	2–0	2–1	2–1		1–1	0–0	1–0	1–1	4–0	4–2	0–0	2–2
Porto B	2–0	0–1	0–1	2–2	1–1	1–2	1–2	0–2	2–1	1–0	1–1	3–1	1–1	2–1		3–2	1–0	1–1	1–1	1–0	0–0	4–0
Santa Clara	4–0	2–1	1–4	1–1	1–1	2–2	0–1	1–0	3–1	1–0	2–0	1–1	2–0	3–1	2–2		0–2	0–0	0–0	0–1	1–1	1–0
Sporting CP B	1–1	0–0	1–3	1–3	3–2	2–2	2–2	5–1	0–0	3–2	2–2	1–1	2–2	2–1	2–0	1–3		2–1	1–1	1–1	2–0	1–0
Sporting da Covilhã	1–1	1–0	4–1	2–2	2–3	1–2	0–0	0–0	2–0	0–1	0–0	1–1	0–1	0–3	1–2	1–0	1–2		1–0	1–1	1–3	2–0
Tondela	4–2	2–1	1–5	1–0	2–1	1–2	1–2	1–0	0–3	3–1	3–1	0–0	2–0	0–1	2–2	4–2	1–2	2–2		1–2	3–2	1–0
Trofense	0–1	3–2	1–2	2–3	3–0	2–1	1–2	2–0	0–1	0–1	0–1	1–1	1–0	2–1	4–2	1–3	0–0	1–1	1–1		0–0	0–0
União da Madeira	1–1	0–0	0–1	0–2	0–0	1–1	3–0	2–1	1–1	0–1	2–2	2–1	0–0	1–1	0–1	2–1	3–2	0–0	2–0	5–3		4–2
Vitória de Guimarães B	1–1	2–0	0–0	0–2	1–0	0–0	2–0	4–2	1–1	0–1	2–2	1–0	2–4	1–2	0–1	2–1	0–0	0–0	0–0	0–0	0–0	

Source: Segunda Liga
Legend: Blue = home team win; Yellow = draw; Red = away team win.

== Season statistics ==
=== Top goalscorers ===
Rank	Player	Club	Goals
1	(Brazil) Joeano	Arouca	24
2	(Portugal) Ricardo Esgaio	Sporting CP B	17
2	(Portugal) Rabiola	Aves / Braga B	17
2	(Portugal) Miguel Rosa	Benfica B	17
5	(Portugal) Luís Barry	Oliveirense	14
6	(Portugal) Tiago Caeiro	Belenenses	13
6	(Brazil) Rafael Porcellis	Santa Clara	13
6	(Portugal) Rui Lima	Oliveirense	13
9	(Nigeria) Simy	Portimonense	12
9	(Portugal) Ivan Cavaleiro	Benfica B	12

=== Hat-tricks ===
Player	For	Against	Result	Date
(Portugal) Tiago Caeiro	Belenenses	Santa Clara	1–4	19 August 2012
(Portugal) Luís Carlos	Portimonense	Freamunde	1–3	26 August 2012
(Brazil) Joeano	Arouca	Trofense	4–0	28 October 2012
(Portugal) Jorge Gonçalves	Feirense	Arouca	5–0	6 December 2012
(Portugal) Luís Aurélio	Tondela	Braga B	0–3	3 February 2013
(Brazil) Platiny	Feirense	Portimonense	3–3	3 February 2013
(Portugal) Rui Lima	Oliveirense	Atlético CP	4–2	10 February 2013
(Brazil) Joeano	Arouca	Sporting Covilhã	3–0	17 February 2013
(Brazil) Joeano	Arouca	Marítimo B	3–1	3 March 2013
(Portugal) Adilson	Atlético CP	Feirense	2–3	7 April 2013

== Awards ==
=== Monthly awards ===
==== SJPF Segunda Liga Player of the Month ====
Month	Player	Club
August	(Portugal) Miguel Rosa	Benfica B
September	(Portugal) Miguel Rosa	Benfica B
October	(Portugal) Miguel Rosa	Benfica B
November	(Portugal) Miguel Rosa	Benfica B
December	(Portugal) Rabiola	Desportivo das Aves
January	(Portugal) Miguel Rosa	Benfica B
February	(Portugal) Miguel Rosa	Benfica B
March	(Portugal) Miguel Rosa	Benfica B
April	(Portugal) Miguel Rosa	Benfica B

==== SJPF Segunda Liga Young Player of the Month ====
Month	Player	Club
August	(Portugal) Miguel Rosa	Benfica B
September	(Portugal) Miguel Rosa	Benfica B
October	(Portugal) Bruma	Sporting CP B
November	(Portugal) Bruma	Sporting CP B
December	(Portugal) Pedro Moreira	Porto B
January	(Portugal) Pedro Moreira	Porto B
February	(Portugal) Miguel Rosa	Benfica B
March	(Portugal) Dani	Arouca
April	(Portugal) Zé Pedro	Leixões

=== Annual awards ===
==== LPFP Segunda Liga Player of the Year ====
The LPFP Segunda Liga Player of the Year was awarded to Miguel Rosa of Benfica. Rosa became the first player to win the award twice after previously winning the award in relation to the 2010–11 season.

==== LPFP Segunda Liga Breakthrough Player of the Year ====
Sporting CP B's Bruma was awarded with the LPFP Segunda Liga Breakthrough Player of the Year award.

==== LPFP Segunda Liga Goalkeeper of the Year ====
The LPFP Segunda Liga Goalkeeper of the Year was awarded to Matt Jones of Belenenses.

==== LPFP Segunda Liga Manager of the Year ====
Belenenses' Mitchell van der Gaag was the recipient of the LPFP Segunda Liga Manager of the Year award.

==== LPFP Segunda Liga Fairplay Award ====
The LPFP Segunda Liga Fairplay Award was awarded to Benfica B.

== See also ==
- 2012–13 Primeira Liga
