= LPFP Awards =

Awards given during the Portuguese League for Professional Football

The LPF Awards are a number of awards given annually during the Portuguese League for Professional Football (LPF) gala, and the winners are chosen by a vote amongst the LPFP pairs. Between 2006 and 2010 the winners were chosen only by a vote amongst the members of Sports National Press Club (CNID). Since 2011, thanks to new sponsorship agreements, all the awards related to football belong to LPFP and their associated.

These awards are given annually to players playing in Primeira Liga and Segunda Liga, as to managers and referees, the most prestigious one being the LPFP Primeira Liga Player of the Year.

== Primeira Liga ==
=== Players ===
Season	Player of the Year	Breakthrough Player	Best Goalkeeper	Best Goal	Sources
2005–06	(Portugal) Ricardo Quaresma (Porto)	–	–	–	
2006–07	(Portugal) Simão (Benfica)	(Portugal) Miguel Veloso (Sporting CP)	–	–	
2007–08	(Argentina) Lisandro López (Porto)	(Portugal) Eduardo (Vitória de Setúbal)	–	–	
2008–09	(Portugal) Bruno Alves (Porto)	(Brazil) Hulk (Porto)	–	–	
2009–10	(Brazil) David Luiz (Benfica)	(Portugal) Fábio Coentrão (Benfica)	–	–	
2010–11	(Brazil) Hulk (Porto)	(Argentina) Nicolás Gaitán (Benfica)	(Brazil) Helton (Porto)	–	
2011–12	(Brazil) Hulk (Porto)	(Colombia) James Rodríguez (Porto)	(Portugal) Rui Patrício (Sporting CP)	–	
2012–13	(Serbia) Nemanja Matić (Benfica)	(Portugal) Josué (Paços de Ferreira)	(Brazil) Helton (Porto)	–	
2013–14	(Argentina) Enzo Pérez (Benfica)	(Portugal) William Carvalho (Sporting CP)	(Slovenia) Jan Oblak (Benfica)	–	
2014–15	(Brazil) Jonas (Benfica)	(Spain) Óliver Torres (Porto)	(Brazil) Júlio César (Benfica)	–	
2015–16	(Brazil) Jonas (Benfica)	(Portugal) Renato Sanches (Benfica)	(Portugal) Rui Patrício (Sporting CP)	(Portugal) Renato Sanches (Benfica)	
2016–17	(Portugal) Pizzi (Benfica)	(Portugal) Nélson Semedo (Benfica)	(Brazil) Ederson (Benfica)	(Portugal) Salvador Agra (Nacional)	
2017–18	(Portugal) Bruno Fernandes (Sporting CP)	(Portugal) Rúben Dias (Benfica)	(Portugal) Rui Patrício (Sporting CP)	(Portugal) Rodrigo Pinho (Marítimo)	
2018–19	(Portugal) Bruno Fernandes (Sporting CP)	(Portugal) João Félix (Benfica)	(Spain) Iker Casillas (Porto)	(Cape Verde) Jovane Cabral (Sporting CP)	
2019–20	(Mexico) Jesús Corona (Porto)	(Portugal) Pedro Gonçalves (Famalicão)	(Argentina) Agustín Marchesín (Porto)	(Cape Verde) Zé Luís (Porto)	
2020–21	(Uruguay) Sebastián Coates (Sporting CP)	(Portugal) Pedro Gonçalves (Sporting CP)	(Spain) Antonio Adán (Sporting CP)	(Guinea-Bissau) Beto (Portimonense)	
2021–22	(Uruguay) Darwin Núñez (Benfica)	(Portugal) Vitinha (Porto)	(Portugal) Diogo Costa (Porto)	(Brazil) André Silva (Arouca)	
2022–23	(Portugal) Otávio (Porto)	(Spain) Iván Jaime (Famalicão)	(Portugal) Diogo Costa (Porto)	(Portugal) Nuno Santos (Sporting CP)	
2023–24	(Sweden) Viktor Gyökeres (Sporting CP)	–	–	(Portugal) João Mendes (Vitória de Guimarães)	
2024–25	(Sweden) Viktor Gyökeres (Sporting CP)	(Portugal) Geovany Quenda (Sporting CP)	–	(Guinea-Bissau) Elves Baldé (Farense)	
2025–26	(Denmark) Victor Froholdt (Porto)	(Denmark) Victor Froholdt (Porto)	–	(Brazil) William Gomes (Porto)	

=== Coaches ===
Season	Coach of the Year	Breakthrough Coach	Sources
2005–06	(Netherlands) Co Adriaanse (Porto)	(Portugal) Paulo Bento (Sporting CP)	
2006–07	(Portugal) Jesualdo Ferreira (Porto)	(Mozambique) Daúto Faquirá (Estrela da Amadora)	
2007–08	(Portugal) Jesualdo Ferreira (Porto)	–	
2008–09	(Portugal) Jesualdo Ferreira (Porto)	(Portugal) Jorge Costa (Olhanense)	
2009–10	(Portugal) Jorge Jesus (Benfica)	(Portugal) André Villas-Boas (Coimbra Academic Association)	
2010–11	(Portugal) André Villas-Boas (Porto)	–	
2011–12	(Portugal) Vítor Pereira (Porto)	–	
2012–13	(Portugal) Vítor Pereira (Porto)	–	
2013–14	(Portugal) Jorge Jesus (Benfica)	–	
2014–15	(Portugal) Jorge Jesus (Benfica)	–	
2015–16	(Portugal) Rui Vitória (Benfica)	–	
2016–17	(Portugal) Rui Vitória (Benfica)	–	
2017–18	(Portugal) Sérgio Conceição (Porto)	–	
2018–19	(Portugal) Bruno Lage (Benfica)	–	
2019–20	(Portugal) Sérgio Conceição (Porto)	–	
2020–21	(Portugal) Ruben Amorim (Sporting CP)	–	
2021–22	(Portugal) Sérgio Conceição (Porto)	–	
2022–23	(Germany) Roger Schmidt (Benfica)	–	
2023–24	(Portugal) Rúben Amorim (Sporting CP)	–	
2024–25	(Portugal) Rui Borges (Sporting CP)	–	

== Segunda Liga ==
=== Players ===
Season	Player of the Year	Breakthrough Player	Best Goalkeeper	Best Goal	Sources
2010–11	(Portugal) Miguel Rosa (C.F. Os Belenenses)	(Portugal) Luís Neto (Varzim SC)	(Portugal) Paulo Lopes (CD Feirense)	–	
2011–12	(Portugal) Licá (GD Estoril Praia)	(Portugal) Miguel Rosa (CF Os Belenenses)	(Brazil) Vagner (GD Estoril Praia)	–	
2012–13	(Portugal) Miguel Rosa (SL Benfica B)	(Portugal) Bruma (Sporting CP B)	(England) Matt Jones (CF Os Belenenses)	–	
2013–14	(Portugal) Jorge Pires (Moreirense FC)	(Portugal) Bernardo Silva (SL Benfica B)	(Portugal) Quim (CD Aves)	–	
2014–15	(Portugal) Tozé Marreco (CD Tondela)	(Portugal) Gonçalo Guedes (SL Benfica B)	(Portugal) Quim (CD Aves)	–	
2015–16	(Portugal) André Silva (FC Porto B)	(Portugal) André Silva (FC Porto B)	(Georgia (country)) Giorgi Makaridze (CD Feirense)	–	
2016–17	(Brazil) Paulinho (Portimonense SC)	(Portugal) Rui Costa (Varzim SC)	(Portugal) Ricardo (Portimonense SC)	–	
2017–18	(Cape Verde) Ricardo Gomes (CD Nacional)	(Portugal) Chiquinho (Associação Académica de Coimbra)	(Portugal) Ricardo Ribeiro (Associação Académica de Coimbra)	–	
2018–19	(Brazil) Luíz Carlos (FC Paços de Ferreira)	(Portugal) Jota (SL Benfica B)	(Portugal) Ricardo Ribeiro (FC Paços de Ferreira)	–	
2019–20	Abandoned due to COVID-19 pandemic				
2020–21	(Portugal) Miguel Crespo (GD Estoril Praia)	(Portugal) André Vidigal (GD Estoril Praia)	(Portugal) Daniel Figueira (GD Estoril Praia)	(Portugal) Joca (Leixões SC)	
2021–22	(Portugal) Guga (Rio Ave FC)	(Portugal) Henrique Araújo (SL Benfica B)	(Portugal) Mika (Associação Académica de Coimbra)	(Portugal) Fábio Fortes (Associação Académica de Coimbra)	
2022–23	(Brazil) André Clóvis (Académico de Viseu)	(Cape Verde) Telmo Arcanjo (CD Tondela)	(Slovenia) Domen Gril (Académico de Viseu)	(Cape Verde) Serginho (UD Oliveirense)	
2023–24	(Portugal) Nené (AVS Futebol SAD)	–	–	–	
2024–25	(Portugal) Diogo Nascimento (FC Vizela)	(Portugal) Diogo Nascimento (FC Vizela)	–	(Brazil) Jô Batista (GD Chaves)	

=== Coaches ===
Season	Coach of the Year	Sources
2010–11	(Portugal) Paulo Alves (Gil Vicente FC)	
2011–12	(Portugal) Marco Silva (GD Estoril Praia)	
2012–13	(Netherlands) Mitchell van der Gaag (CF Os Belenenses)	
2013–14	(Portugal) Miguel Leal (FC Penafiel)	
2014–15	(Portugal) Vítor Oliveira (CF União)	
2015–16	(Portugal) Vítor Oliveira (GD Chaves)	
2016–17	(Portugal) Vítor Oliveira (Portimonense SC)	
2017–18	(Portugal) Costinha (CD Nacional)	
2018–19	(Portugal) Vítor Oliveira (FC Paços de Ferreira)	
2019–20	Abandoned due to COVID-19 pandemic	
2020–21	(Portugal) Álvaro Pacheco (FC Vizela)	
2021–22	(Portugal) Filipe Martins (Casa Pia AC)	
2022–23	(Portugal) Paulo Alves (Moreirense FC)	
2023–24	(Portugal) Tiago Margarido (CD Nacional)	
2024–25	(Portugal) Luís Pinto (CD Tondela)	

== See also ==
- LPFP Primeira Liga Player of the Year
- CNID Footballer of the Year
- List of Portuguese League Champions and Top Scorers
