= Dani Coelho =

Portuguese footballer

Personal information
- Full name: Daniel Filipe Faria Coelho
- Date of birth: 17 January 1990 (age 36)
- Place of birth: Barcelos, Portugal
- Height: 1.77 m (5 ft 10 in)
- Position: Right back

Team information
- Current team: Berço

Youth career
- 2001–2009: Braga

Senior career*
Years	Team	Apps	(Gls)
2009–2012	Braga	0	(0)
2009–2010	→ Estrela Amadora (loan)	15	(0)
2010–2011	→ Vizela (loan)	23	(1)
2011–2012	→ Covilhã (loan)	22	(0)
2012–2013	Arouca	27	(2)
2013–2015	Penafiel	63	(1)
2015–2016	CFR Cluj	16	(1)
2016–2017	Vizela	22	(0)
2017–2018	Santa Clara	13	(0)
2018–2019	Lusitânia	28	(0)
2019–2020	Loures	18	(1)
2020–	Berço	17	(2)

International career
2005–2006	Portugal U16	3	(0)
2006	Portugal U17	2	(0)
2008	Portugal U18	3	(0)
2008	Portugal U19	2	(0)
2010	Portugal U20	3	(0)
2011	Portugal U21	5	(0)
- * Club domestic league appearances and goals as of 15 December 2019

Daniel "Dani" Filipe Faria Coelho (born 17 January 1990) is a Portuguese professional footballer who plays for Berço as a right back.

== Club career ==
A youth product of S.C. Braga, Dani only managed to appear once for the first team in official matches, playing the full 90 minutes in a 2–1 away win against S.U. 1º de Dezembro for the third round in the Portuguese Cup, on 10 October 2010. He was also loaned to C.F. Estrela da Amadora, S.C. Covilhã and F.C. Vizela during his spell, the latter being the farm team.

In the summer of 2012, Dani signed for F.C. Arouca of the second division, starting in 26 of his 27 league appearances as the club promoted to the Primeira Liga for the first time in its history. One year later, he moved to fellow league side F.C. Penafiel on a free transfer.

== Honours ==
CFR Cluj

- Cupa României: 2015–16
