= Miguel Rosa =

Portuguese footballer (born 1989)

Personal information
- Full name: Miguel Alexandre Jesus Rosa
- Date of birth: 13 January 1989 (age 37)
- Place of birth: Lisbon, Portugal
- Height: 1.74 m (5 ft 9 in)
- Position: Midfielder

Youth career
- 1998–2008: Benfica

Senior career*
Years	Team	Apps	(Gls)
2008–2013	Benfica	0	(0)
2008–2009	→ Estoril (loan)	21	(3)
2009–2010	→ Carregado (loan)	28	(10)
2010–2012	→ Belenenses (loan)	57	(17)
2012–2013	Benfica B	41	(17)
2013–2018	Belenenses	104	(17)
2018–2019	Cova Piedade	43	(6)
2020–2021	Cova Piedade	21	(5)
2021–2022	Estrela Amadora	20	(2)
2023–2024	Sintrense	19	(2)
2024	Vitória Setúbal	3	(0)
2025	Sacavenense		
Total		357	(79)

International career
2006	Portugal U17	5	(0)
2007	Portugal U18	3	(0)
2008	Portugal U19	5	(3)
- * Club domestic league appearances and goals

Miguel Alexandre Jesus Rosa (born 13 January 1989) is a Portuguese former professional footballer who played as a midfielder.

Developed at Benfica, where he played only in the reserve team, he achieved Primeira Liga totals of 104 games and 17 goals, all for Belenenses. He spent most of his career in second division with that club and five others, making 231 appearances and scoring 60 goals.

== Club career ==
=== Benfica ===
A product of hometown's S.L. Benfica's youth system, Lisbon-born Rosa joined the club at the age of nine. In a 2006–07 end-of-season friendly with AEK Athens FC, courtesy of manager Fernando Santos, he made his debut with the first team, replacing legendary Rui Costa. He eventually returned to the juniors, scoring 18 goals in his last year in the category.

Rosa would be loaned by Benfica in the following three seasons, always to clubs in the Segunda Liga. He made his professional debut on 31 August 2008, playing 17 minutes for G.D. Estoril Praia in a 0–0 home draw against U.D. Oliveirense, and was voted the league's Young Player of the Month in December 2008. He scored ten goals in the 2009–10 campaign for A.D. Carregado (11 overall) who were competing at that level for the first time ever, eventually being relegated.

In 2010–11, with C.F. Os Belenenses, Rosa was often played as a second striker instead of his favoured attacking midfielder position. He finished with 11 goals in all competitions, and was named the Player of the Year.

In the following summer, Rosa was called to Benfica's first team along with fellow youth graduates Nélson Oliveira, Rúben Pinto and David Simão. However, it was soon after announced that the club and Belenenses had reached an agreement on extending the loan for the entire 2011–12 season: he continued with his goalscoring form and ended his second stint as team top scorer, also being voted the division two's Breakthrough Player of the Year.

After his stint at Belenenses, Rosa was linked with Vitória de Setúbal, but he eventually returned to Benfica, being given the captain armband at their reserves. On 27 October 2012 he was called by first-team coach Jorge Jesus for a Primeira Liga match against Gil Vicente FC, but did not leave the bench. He finished the second-division campaign as the player with the most goals for his side, and for the second time in his career was voted Player of the Year.

=== Belenenses ===
Rosa signed for former club Belenenses on 2 August 2013, on a five-year contract. He played his first game in the Portuguese top flight on the 18th, replacing Fredy for the last 30 minutes of a 0–3 defeat against Rio Ave F.C. at the Estádio do Restelo.

On 13 March 2016, Rosa scored his team's second goal in a 3–0 home win over S.C. Braga. It was eventually voted best goal of the month.

=== Cova da Piedade ===
Rosa dropped back to the second tier in January 2018, signing an 18-month deal with C.D. Cova da Piedade instead of several offers from the top flight. Released at the end of his contract with the team from Almada, he remained out of work until January 2020, when he rejoined the same club until the end of the season.

On 9 September 2020, Rosa was one of several players given new contracts, as the side avoided their scheduled relegation due to the COVID-19 pandemic.

== International career ==
An international for Portugal at youth level, Rosa was elected Best Player in the 2008 Torneio Internacional do Porto for the under-19 team.

== Career statistics ==
As of 13 July 2021

Club	Season	League		Cup		League Cup		Europe		Total	
Club	Season	Apps	Goals	Apps	Goals	Apps	Goals	Apps	Goals	Apps	Goals
Estoril	2008–09	21	3	2	0	1	1	-		24	4
Carregado	2009–10	28	10	0	0	2	1	-		30	11
Belenenses	2010–11	27	11	2	0	1	0	-		30	11
Belenenses	2011–12	30	6	4	3	5	4	-		39	13
Belenenses	2013–14	23	5	1	0	3	0	-		27	5
Belenenses	2014–15	25	5	4	1	4	1	-		33	7
Belenenses	2015–16	25	6	0	0	3	0	5	0	33	6
Belenenses	2016–17	26	1	0	0	3	2	-		29	3
Belenenses	2017–18	5	0	1	0	1	0	-		7	0
Belenenses	Total	161	34	12	4	20	7	5	0	198	45
Benfica B	2012–13	41	17	-		-		-		41	17
Cova Piedade	2017–18	16	3	0	0	0	0	-		16	3
Cova Piedade	2018–19	27	3	3	1	1	0	-		31	4
Cova Piedade	2019–20	5	1	0	0	0	0	-		5	1
Cova Piedade	2020–21	16	4	3	0	0	0	-		19	4
Cova Piedade	Total	64	11	6	1	1	0	-		71	12
Career totals		315	75	20	5	24	9	5	0	364	89

== Honours ==
- Segunda Liga Player of the Year: 2010–11, 2012–13
- Segunda Liga Breakthrough Player of the Year: 2011–12
- SJPF Segunda Liga Young Player of the Month: December 2008, October 2011, April 2012, August/September 2012, February 2013
- SJPF Segunda Liga Player of the Month: August/September 2012, October/November 2012, January 2013, February 2013, March 2013, April 2013
- Primeira Liga Goal of the Month: March 2016
- Taça da Liga top scorer: 2011–12
- Torneio Internacional do Porto Best Player: 2008
