= Fanã =

Portuguese football manager (born 1960)

Personal information
- Full name: Fernando Marques de Sousa Pires
- Date of birth: 27 October 1960 (age 66)
- Place of birth: Faro, Portugal

Team information
- Current team: Farense U19 (manager)

Youth career
- Farense

Senior career*
Years	Team	Apps	(Gls)
1980–1981	São Luís		
1981–1982	Faro e Benfica		

Managerial career
- 1988: Farense U19
- 1988–1999: Farense (assistant)
- 1999–2000: Louletano
- 2000–2001: Olhanense
- 2001–2002: Ovarense
- 2002–2004: Louletano
- 2004–2005: Covilhã
- 2005–2006: Al-Seeb
- 2006–2007: Muscat
- 2007–2008: Al-Nasr Kuwait
- 2009–2010: Gondomar
- 2010–2011: Al-Shabab Seeb
- 2011–2012: Hatta
- 2012–2013: Covilhã
- 2013–2014: Dibba Al-Hisn
- 2014–2016: Emirates Club U21
- 2017–2018: Louletano
- 2019–2020: Farense 1910
- 2021: Farense
- 2021–2024: Farense U23
- 2024–: Farense U19
- * Club domestic league appearances and goals

Fernando Marques de Sousa Pires (born 27 October 1960), known as Fanã, is a Portuguese football manager and former player. He is the current manager of Farense's under-19 team.

Having been assistant to Paco Fortes at Farense in the Primeira Liga in the 1990s, he went on to manage Ovarense, Covilhã and Farense in the second tier, each in a different decade. In the third tier, he had three spells at Louletano, and won the 2004–05 title for Covilhã. Abroad, he managed clubs in Oman, Kuwait and the United Arab Emirates.

== Career ==
Born in Faro on the Algarve, Fanã was briefly a youth player for S.C. Farense and senior player for minor local clubs FC São Luís and Sport Faro e Benfica before returning to Farense as assistant manager to Spaniard Paco Fortes. Under their leadership in the 1990s, the club recorded its highest Primeira Liga finish and qualification for the UEFA Cup.

After being head coach at Louletano D.C. and S.C. Olhanense in the third tier, he was hired at A.D. Ovarense in the second division for 2001–02, leaving in March with the team in 14th. After a return to Louletano, he was appointed at S.C. Covilhã in 2004–05, winning the third-tier championship.

After spells at Al-Seeb Club and Muscat Club in the Oman Professional League, and Al-Nasr SC of the Kuwait Premier League, Fanã returned to his country's third division in August 2009 at Gondomar S.C. He then went back to the Middle East to lead Al-Shabab Seeb in Oman and Hatta Club in the UAE First Division League, before in November 2012 moving to his country's second division for the first time in a decade; he succeeded Filipe Moreira at S.C. Covilhã. After 3 wins and 9 defeats in 16 games for the club from the Serra da Estrela, he was dismissed on 26 February 2013 with the team one place above the relegation zone, and replaced by Francisco Chaló.

Fanã then went back to the United Arab Emirates, managing Dibba Al-Hisn SC and the under-21 team of Emirates Club. On 28 November 2017, he was hired for a third spell at Louletano, 13 years after his last time there. He managed the club for two seasons in the third-tier Campeonato de Portugal before moving to Farense 1910, a farm team of his hometown club. In 2019–20, they were the only senior club in the country to win all of their games, with 18 victories before the COVID-19 pandemic curtailed the season; this won them promotion to the Algarve Football Association's first district league.

On 1 September 2021, Fanã went from under-23 to head coach at Farense, after Jorge Costa's exit. He returned to his previous post on 19 December.
