= 2010–11 Liga de Honra =

21st season of second-tier football league in Portugal

Liga de Honra
- Season: 2010–11
- Champions: Gil Vicente
- Promoted: Gil Vicente; Feirense
- Relegated: Varzim; Fátima
- Matches: 240
- Goals: 594 (2.48 per match)
- Top goalscorer: Bock (15)

The 2010–11 Liga de Honra season was the 21st season of the second-tier football in Portugal. A total of 16 teams will contest the league, 12 of which already contested in the 2009–10, and two of which were promoted from the Portuguese Second Division, and two of which were relegated from 2009–10. The official ball is Adidas Jabulani.

== Changes in 2010–11 ==
=== Team changes ===
Location of teams in Liga Orangina 2010–11
Location of teams in Liga Orangina 2010–11

Teams relegated from 2009–10 Primeira Liga

- 15th Place: Belenenses
- 16th Place: Leixões

Teams promoted to 2010–11 Portuguese Liga

- Champions: Beira-Mar
- Runners-up: Portimonense

Teams promoted from 2009–10 Segunda Divisão

- Champions: Arouca
- Runners-up: Moreirense

Teams relegated to 2010–11 Segunda Divisão

- 15th Place: Chaves
- 16th Place: Carregado

Club	City	Stadium	Capacity
Arouca	Arouca	Estádio Municipal de Arouca	2,500
Belenenses	Lisbon	Estádio do Restelo	32,500
Covilhã	Covilhã	Complexo Desportivo da Covilhã	3,000
Desportivo das Aves	Vila das Aves	Estádio do CD das Aves	10,250
Estoril Praia	Estoril	Estádio António Coimbra da Mota	8,000
Fátima	Fátima	Estádio Municipal de Fátima	1,545
Feirense	Santa Maria da Feira	Estádio Marcolino de Castro	4,667
Freamunde	Freamunde	Complexo Desportivo do SC Freamunde	5,000
Gil Vicente	Barcelos	Estádio Cidade de Barcelos	12,374
Moreirense	Moreira de Cónegos	Comendador Joaquim De Almeida Freitas	9,000
Leixões	Matosinhos	Estádio do Mar	16,035
Oliveirense	Oliveira de Azeméis	Estádio Carlos Osório	9,100
Penafiel	Penafiel	Estádio Municipal 25 de Abril	7,000
Santa Clara	Ponta Delgada	Estádio de São Miguel	15,277
Trofense	Trofa	Estádio do Clube Desportivo Trofense	3,164
Varzim	Póvoa de Varzim	Estádio do Varzim SC	11,000

=== Personnel and kits ===
Team	Head coach	Captain	Kit manufacturer	Shirt sponsor
Arouca	(Portugal) Henrique Nunes	(Portugal) Jorge Leitão	Lacatoni	Estabelecimentos Cavadinha
Belenenses	(Portugal) José Mota		Macron	MetLife
Sporting da Covilhã	(Portugal) João Pinto		Desportreino	Natura IMB Hotels
Desportivo das Aves	(Portugal) Micael Sequeira		Alitecno	Transportes Freitas
Estoril Praia	(Brazil) Vinícius Eutrópio		Nike	Casino Estoril
Fátima	(Portugal) Diamantino Miranda		Lacatoni	Lena Construções
Feirense	(Portugal) Quim Machado		Hummel	Patrícios
Freamunde	(Portugal) Nicolau Vaqueiro		Lacatoni	Capital do Móvel
Gil Vicente	(Portugal) Paulo Alves		MadSport	GIVEC
Moreirense	(Portugal) Jorge Casquilha		Lacatoni	
Leixões	(Portugal) Litos		SportZone	CEPSA
Oliveirense	(Portugal) Pedro Miguel		Macron	Grupo Simoldes
Penafiel	(Angola) Lázaro Oliveira		Desportreino	RESTRADAS
Santa Clara	(Portugal) Bruno Moura		Lacatoni	Açoreana Seguros
Trofense	(Portugal) Porfírio Amorim		Lacatoni	Ricon
Varzim	(Portugal) Eduardo Esteves		Lacatoni	

=== Managerial changes ===
Team	Outgoing head coach	Manner of departure	Date of vacancy	Position in table	Incoming head coach	Date of appointment
Estoril	(Portugal) Professor Neca	Contract expired	8 May 2010	Pre-season	(Brazil) Vinícius Eutrópio	14 May 2010
Freamunde	(Portugal) Jorge Regadas	Contract expired	8 May 2010	Pre-season	(Portugal) Nicolau Vaqueiro	10 June 2010
Fátima	(Portugal) Rui Vitória	Resigned	2 June 2010	Pre-season	(Portugal) Diamantino Miranda	22 June 2010
Belenenses	(Brazil) Baltemar Brito	Sacked	6 July 2010	Pre-season	(Portugal) Rui Gregório	10 July 2010
Belenenses	(Portugal) Rui Gregório	Sacked	26 October 2010	6th	(Portugal) José Mota	28 October 2010
Fátima	(Portugal) Diamantino Miranda	Resigned	20 November 2010	14th	(Portugal) João Sousa	20 November 2010
Fátima	(Portugal) João Sousa	Resigned	9 February 2011	16th	(Portugal) Ricardo Moura	9 February 2011
Sporting da Covilhã	(Portugal) João Pinto	Resigned	15 February 2011	15th	(Portugal) Tulipa	22 February 2011

== League table ==
Pos	Team	Pld	W	D	L	GF	GA	GD	Pts	Promotion or relegation
1	Gil Vicente (C, P)	30	15	10	5	55	38	+17	55 (Note: GVI 3–2 FEI; FEI 0–1 GIV)	Promotion to Primeira Liga
2	Feirense (P)	30	17	4	9	41	31	+10	55	Promotion to Primeira Liga
3	Trofense	30	15	9	6	41	27	+14	54	
4	Oliveirense	30	12	9	9	36	35	+1	45	
5	Arouca	30	11	10	9	47	41	+6	43	
6	Leixões	30	10	12	8	35	27	+8	42	
7	Moreirense	30	10	10	10	36	41	−5	40 (Note: MFC 1–0 DAV; DAV 2–2 MFC)	
8	Desportivo das Aves	30	10	10	10	35	31	+4	40	
9	Santa Clara	30	10	8	12	26	29	−3	38 (Note: STC 1–0 ESP; ESP 0–2 STC)	
10	Estoril	30	9	11	10	36	31	+5	38	
11	Freamunde	30	8	13	9	37	39	−2	37	
12	Penafiel	30	9	9	12	37	44	−7	36	
13	Belenenses	30	8	11	11	33	36	−3	35	
14	Sporting da Covilhã	30	9	5	16	32	48	−16	32	
15	Varzim (R)	30	6	13	11	38	48	−10	31	Relegation to Segunda Divisão
16	Fátima (R)	30	5	8	17	29	49	−20	23	Relegation to Segunda Divisão

Source: Liga Orangina (Liga Honra)
Rules for classification: 1) points; 2) head-to-head points; 3) head-to-head goal difference; 4) head-to-head goals scored; 5) goal difference; 6) number of goals scored.
(C) Champions; (P) Promoted; (R) Relegated

=== Positions by round ===
Team ╲ Round	1	2	3	4	5	6	7	8	9	10	11	12	13	14	15	16	17	18	19	20	21	22	23	24	25	26	27	28	29	30
Gil Vicente	2	1	2	1	1	1	1	2	3	5	7	6	6	5	4	5	5	7	4	5	3	4	4	4	3	3	2	2	2	1
Feirense	10	12	5	5	2	4	3	6	9	7	1	1	1	2	5	6	4	4	3	3	4	3	2	2	1	1	1	1	1	2
Trofense	13	5	9	10	8	5	4	1	2	3	4	2	4	4	1	3	2	1	2	1	2	2	3	3	2	2	3	3	3	3
Oliveirense	4	10	11	12	11	13	12	9	6	4	5	3	2	1	2	1	1	2	1	2	1	1	1	1	4	4	4	4	4	4
Arouca	6	11	13	8	7	2	6	4	1	1	2	4	3	3	3	2	3	3	5	6	5	5	5	5	5	5	6	8	6	5
Leixões	13	5	9	9	8	6	7	8	5	2	3	5	5	8	7	7	8	8	10	10	7	6	6	6	6	6	7	5	5	6
Moreirense	4	7	3	7	3	7	8	10	12	13	14	11	12	7	8	10	13	13	11	11	11	10	10	11	11	11	12	9	10	7
Desportivo das Aves	6	2	7	13	13	8	9	12	13	15	15	13	10	6	6	4	6	5	8	8	9	7	8	8	7	7	5	6	7	8
Santa Clara	6	14	15	14	14	10	10	7	11	8	10	9	11	10	12	15	12	10	9	7	8	8	9	9	8	8	8	7	8	9
Estoril Praia	15	4	8	2	4	3	2	5	8	10	8	7	9	13	11	9	7	5	6	4	6	9	7	7	9	9	9	10	12	10
Freamunde	10	15	16	16	16	12	14	14	14	12	13	14	15	14	14	11	11	9	7	8	10	11	12	10	10	10	10	11	9	11
Penafiel	1	3	1	3	5	9	5	3	4	6	6	10	8	11	13	8	10	12	13	13	13	12	13	13	13	12	11	12	11	12
Belenenses	6	13	6	11	10	14	15	15	16	14	12	15	14	12	10	13	9	11	12	12	12	13	11	12	12	13	13	13	13	13
Sporting da Covilhã	2	9	4	6	12	15	13	11	7	9	11	12	13	15	15	14	15	15	15	15	16	16	16	14	14	15	15	14	14	14
Varzim	12	16	14	15	15	16	16	13	10	11	9	8	7	9	9	12	14	14	14	14	14	14	15	16	15	14	14	15	15	15
Fátima	15	7	12	4	6	11	11	16	15	16	16	16	16	16	16	16	16	16	16	16	15	15	14	15	16	16	16	16	16	16

Source: LPFP.pt (in Portuguese)
= Leader; = 2nd place; = 3rd place

== Results ==
Home \ Away	ARO	BEL	DAV	ESP	FAT	FEI	FRM	GVI	LEI	MOR	OLI	PEN	STC	SCO	TRO	VAR
Arouca		1–1	1–3	0–0	3–0	2–2	1–0	2–2	1–0	3–0	0–0	6–3	1–0	2–0	1–3	3–3
Belenenses	1–0		1–1	0–1	1–1	1–2	3–0	2–0	0–0	1–1	3–3	2–0	0–0	1–3	0–1	4–2
Desportivo das Aves	3–2	2–0		2–1	2–0	0–2	2–1	1–2	2–2	2–2	3–0	0–1	2–1	2–0	1–1	1–1
Estoril Praia	5–2	1–1	2–0		2–0	0–1	1–1	1–3	0–1	2–0	2–0	2–0	0–2	3–1	2–2	0–0
Fátima	1–0	4–2	0–0	2–2		1–2	2–2	1–3	0–2	2–2	1–2	1–0	1–2	1–1	0–2	1–0
Feirense	2–1	1–0	0–3	1–0	2–1		0–0	0–1	0–0	2–1	2–3	2–1	1–0	2–1	1–0	2–1
Freamunde	2–2	2–2	1–0	2–2	2–1	2–1		0–1	3–3	1–0	0–0	1–4	1–0	5–1	1–0	0–0
Gil Vicente	1–1	1–1	4–2	2–1	3–1	3–2	1–1		0–0	2–1	0–1	4–1	3–0	1–1	2–1	2–2
Leixões	0–2	1–0	0–0	1–1	3–0	2–1	3–1	2–0		0–0	1–1	2–1	1–0	0–1	1–2	3–4
Moreirense	3–2	2–1	1–0	1–0	2–1	2–5	2–1	1–1	0–0		2–0	2–1	1–0	1–1	2–4	3–2
Oliveirense	2–2	0–1	1–0	1–1	1–0	0–1	1–1	2–4	1–0	1–1		2–0	2–0	1–0	1–0	0–1
Penafiel	0–1	0–0	0–0	0–0	2–1	1–0	3–2	2–2	1–4	1–1	3–2		1–1	1–1	1–1	2–0
Santa Clara	1–1	2–0	0–0	1–0	0–0	2–1	1–1	3–1	2–1	1–0	1–2	0–3		3–1	0–1	0–0
Sporting da Covilhã	2–3	2–0	1–0	0–1	3–0	0–3	1–0	2–1	2–1	2–1	1–3	0–0	0–1		0–2	1–2
Trofense	0–1	1–2	2–0	2–1	1–1	0–0	1–1	2–2	0–0	1–0	3–2	1–0	3–2	2–1		2–1
Varzim	1–0	1–2	1–1	2–2	0–4	2–0	0–2	1–3	1–1	1–1	1–1	3–4	0–0	5–2	0–0	

Source: Liga Orangina (Liga Honra)
Legend: Blue = home team win; Yellow = draw; Red = away team win.

== Stats ==
=== Top goalscorers ===
Position	Player	Club	Goals
1	(Portugal) Bock	Freamunde	15
2	(Gabon) Henry Antchouet	Moreirense	12
3	(Brazil) Kiko	Arouca	11
3	(Cameroon) Jérémie N'Jock	Arouca	11
3	(Portugal) Miguel Rosa	Belenenses	11
6	(Brazil) Alex Afonso	Estoril	10
6	(Portugal) Rafael Lopes	Varzim	10
6	(Cape Verde) Zé Luís	Gil Vicente	10
6	(Brazil) Michel	Penafiel	10
10	(Senegal) Abdoulaye Ba	Covilhã	9
10	(Brazil) Luis Carlos	Gil Vicente	9
10	(Portugal) Hugo Moreira	Santa Clara	9
10	(Portugal) Oliveira	Leixões	9
10	(Brazil) Roberto	Feirense	9
