= Luís Carlos (footballer, born 1982) =

Portuguese footballer

Personal information
- Full name: Luís Carlos Teixeira de Oliveira
- Date of birth: 25 November 1982 (age 43)
- Place of birth: Lisbon, Portugal
- Height: 1.73 m (5 ft 8 in)
- Position: Attacking midfielder

Team information
- Current team: Alta de Lisboa

Youth career
- 1993–1996: Benfica
- 1996–1997: CAC Pontinha
- 1997–1998: Benfica
- 1998–2000: Odivelas
- 2000–2001: Sporting CP

Senior career*
Years	Team	Apps	(Gls)
2001–2002	Palmense		
2002–2003	Coruchense		
2003–2004	Lusitano Évora		
2004–2005	Santacombadense		
2005–2006	Valdevez	13	(1)
2006–2007	Penafiel	20	(2)
2007–2009	Estoril	56	(7)
2009–2010	Vitória Setúbal	19	(0)
2010–2011	Belenenses	16	(0)
2011–2012	Penafiel	5	(0)
2012–2013	Portimonense	41	(6)
2013–2014	Chaves	20	(0)
2014–2017	Mafra	85	(3)
2017–	Alta de Lisboa		
- * Club domestic league appearances and goals as of 7 May 2017

Luís Carlos Teixeira de Oliveira (born 25 November 1982, in Lisbon), known as Luís Carlos, is a Portuguese footballer who plays for União Desportiva Alta de Lisboa as an attacking midfielder.
