= Rui Gomes (football manager) =

Portuguese football coach (born 1970)

Personal information
- Full name: Rui Pedro Alves Gomes
- Date of birth: 15 March 1970 (age 56)
- Place of birth: Porto, Portugal

Managerial career
- Years: Team
- 2012–2013: Porto B

Rui Pedro Alves Gomes (born 15 March 1970) is a Portuguese football coach. He spent most of his career with youth teams, and as an assistant to Pedro Emanuel mainly in the Middle East. In 2012–13, he led Porto B in the second division.

== Career ==
Born in Porto, Gomes began coaching in the youth ranks of Leixões S.C. before joining FC Porto in 2005. He won national titles for the under-17 team in 2008–09 and the under-19 team in 2010–11.

On 6 June 2012, he was announced as manager of FC Porto B, as reserve teams were permitted to join the second division. The team's debut on 12 August was a 2–2 draw away to C.D. Tondela, and the season ended on 18 May with a goalless game at Associação Naval 1º de Maio to finish 14th.

After his season at Porto B, Gomes became academy director at Al-Ahli Saudi FC. In March 2017, Gomes arrived at G.D. Estoril Praia as assistant to former Porto player Pedro Emanuel. A year later, he headed back to Saudi Arabia to assist the same manager at Al Taawoun FC. The pair returned to the Iberian Peninsula in August 2019 at UD Almería in the Spanish Segunda División.

Pedro Emanuel and Gomes then went back to the Middle East, resuming their partnership at Al Ain FC in the UAE Pro League, followed by the Saudi trio of Al-Nassr FC, Al-Khaleej FC and Al-Fayha Club. In July 2026, they joined CR Vasco da Gama in the Campeonato Brasileiro Série A.
