= Rui Lima =

Portuguese footballer

Personal information
- Full name: Rui Manuel Pinto de Lima
- Date of birth: 25 March 1978 (age 48)
- Place of birth: Porto, Portugal
- Height: 1.75 m (5 ft 9 in)
- Position: Midfielder

Youth career
- 1988–1989: Cerco do Porto
- 1989–1997: Boavista

Senior career*
Years	Team	Apps	(Gls)
1997–1998	Gondomar	32	(3)
1998–1999	Aves	32	(3)
1999–2000	Chaves	33	(12)
2000–2001	Aves	32	(4)
2001–2002	Boavista	13	(1)
2002–2003	Vitória Setúbal	31	(2)
2003	Boavista	1	(0)
2004–2007	Beira-Mar	95	(3)
2007	Omonia	6	(1)
2008	Nea Salamis	11	(2)
2008–2009	Boavista	29	(3)
2009–2010	Nea Salamis	12	(1)
2010	Hapoel Haifa	3	(0)
2010–2015	Oliveirense	161	(44)
2015–2017	Salgueiros	40	(3)
2017–2018	Canelas 2010	28	(8)
2018–2019	Salgueiros	30	(5)
2019–2021	Pedras Rubras	25	(2)
Total		614	(97)

International career
1993	Portugal U15	7	(1)
1993–1994	Portugal U16	13	(0)
1995	Portugal U17	7	(1)
1995–1996	Portugal U18	13	(1)
1998	Portugal U20	2	(0)
2002–2003	Portugal B	4	(0)
- * Club domestic league appearances and goals

Rui Manuel Pinto de Lima (born 25 March 1978) is a Portuguese former professional footballer who played as a left midfielder.

== Club career ==
Lima was born in Porto. During his early and mid-career, he played for his hometown club Boavista F.C. on two separate occasions, also representing Gondomar SC, C.D. Aves (twice), G.D. Chaves, Vitória de Setúbal and S.C. Beira-Mar, experiencing his most solid period whilst at the latter with three Primeira Liga seasons in four years.

In summer 2007, Lima started an abroad adventure, joining Cypriot First Division side AC Omonia. He finished the campaign with another team in the country, Nea Salamis Famagusta FC, returning to Boavista in 2008 with the club recently relegated to the Segunda Liga.

After Boavista dropped another level in 2008–09, Lima returned to Cyprus, linking up with another former acquaintance, Nea Salamina. In late January 2010, however, he changed teams – and countries – again, signing with Hapoel Haifa F.C. from Israel.

From 2010 to 2015, Lima competed in the second division with U.D. Oliveirense. He scored a career-best 16 goals in the 2013–14 season, aged 35/36 (eight from penalties).

Lima then switched to the third tier where he all but remained until his retirement at 43. He represented S.C. Salgueiros, CF Canelas 2010 and F.C. Pedras Rubras.

== International career ==
Lima earned caps for Portugal at youth level. He also appeared four times for their B team.

== Honours ==
Beira-Mar

- Liga de Honra: 2005–06
