= Luís Barry =

Portuguese footballer (born 1982)

Personal information
- Full name: Luís Filipe da Silva Barry
- Date of birth: 30 January 1982 (age 44)
- Place of birth: Corroios, Portugal
- Height: 1.96 m (6 ft 5 in)
- Position: Striker

Youth career
- 1993–2000: Ginásio Corroios
- 2000–2001: Vitória Setúbal

Senior career*
| Years | Team | Apps | (Gls) |
| 2001–2002 | Samouquense | | |
| 2003–2004 | Redondense | | |
| 2004–2005 | Atlético Reguengos | | |
| 2005–2006 | Lusitano | | |
| 2007–2011 | Atlético Reguengos | 85 | (50) |
| 2011–2012 | Redondense | 13 | (7) |
| 2012 | Atlético CP | 14 | (3) |
| 2012–2013 | Oliveirense | 40 | (14) |
| 2013–2016 | Chaves | 119 | (35) |
| 2016–2017 | Aves | 28 | (11) |
| 2017–2019 | Académico Viseu | 52 | (7) |
| 2019–2021 | Castro Daire | 40 | (12) |
| 2021–2024 | Lusitano Vildemoinhos | 96 | (37) |
| Total | | 487+ | (176+) |
- * Club domestic league appearances and goals

Luís Filipe da Silva Barry (born 30 January 1982) is a Portuguese former professional footballer who played as a striker.

== Club career ==
Born in Corroios, Seixal, Setúbal District, Barry played lower league or amateur football until the age of 30, representing mainly Atlético S.C. and scoring a career-best 18 fourth division goals for them in the 2008–09 season. In January 2012 he moved to the professionals when he signed for Segunda Liga club Atlético Clube de Portugal, making his debut in the competition later that month in a 5–0 away loss against G.D. Estoril Praia.

After one year with U.D. Oliveirense also in the second tier, Barry joined G.D. Chaves. During his spell at the Estádio Municipal Eng. Manuel Branco Teixeira he scored regularly, notably contributing 12 goals in 43 games in the 2015–16 campaign as the side returned to the Primeira Liga after a lengthy absence; he was notified of his release through an SMS.
