= 2018–19 LigaPro =

29th season of second-tier football league in Portugal

LigaPro
- Season: 2018–19
- Champions: Paços de Ferreira; 4th title
- Promoted: Paços de Ferreira; Famalicão
- Relegated: Arouca; Braga B Vitória de Guimarães B

The 2018–19 LigaPro (also known as Ledman LigaPro for sponsorship reasons) was the 29th season of Portuguese football's second-tier league, and the fifth season under the current LigaPro title. A total of 18 teams competed in this division, including reserve sides from top-flight Primeira Liga teams.

== Teams ==
A total of 18 teams contested the league, including 14 sides from the 2017–18 season, 2 teams relegated from the 2017–18 Primeira Liga and 2 promoted from the 2017–18 Campeonato de Portugal.

=== Team changes ===
Relegated from 2017–18 Primeira Liga

- Paços de Ferreira
- Estoril

Promoted from 2017–18 Campeonato de Portugal

- Farense
- Mafra

Promoted to 2018–19 Primeira Liga

- Nacional
- Santa Clara

Relegated to 2018–19 Campeonato de Portugal

- União da Madeira
- Sporting CP B
- Gil Vicente
- Real

=== Stadium and locations ===
Location of teams in 2018–19 LigaPro

Team	Location	Stadium	Capacity	2017–18 finish
Académica	Coimbra	Estádio Cidade de Coimbra	29,622	4th
Académico de Viseu	Viseu	Estádio do Fontelo	7,744	3rd
Arouca	Arouca	Estádio Municipal de Arouca	5,000	6th
Benfica B	Seixal	Caixa Futebol Campus	2,720	13th
Braga B	Braga	Estádio 1.º de Maio	28,000	16th
Cova da Piedade	Cova da Piedade	Estádio Municipal José Martins Vieira	3,000	9th
Estoril	Estoril	Estádio António Coimbra da Mota	8,000	18th (PL)
Famalicão	Vila Nova de Famalicão	Estádio Municipal 22 de Junho	5,186	14th
Farense	Faro	Estádio de São Luís	7,000	2nd (CP)
Leixões	Matosinhos	Estádio do Mar	9,766	8th
Mafra	Mafra	Estádio Municipal de Mafra	1,200	1st (CP)
Oliveirense	Oliveira de Azeméis	Estádio Municipal de Aveiro	30,127	12th
Paços de Ferreira	Paços de Ferreira	Estádio Capital do Móvel	9,076	17th (PL)
Penafiel	Penafiel	Estádio Municipal 25 de Abril	6,500	5th
Porto B	Vila Nova de Gaia	Estádio Municipal Jorge Sampaio	8,500	7th
Sp. Covilhã	Covilhã	Estádio Municipal José dos Santos Pinto	3,500	15th
Varzim	Póvoa de Varzim	Estádio do Varzim SC	7,280	10th
Vitória de Guimarães B	Guimarães	Estádio D. Afonso Henriques	30,000	11th

=== Personnel and sponsors ===
Team	Head coach	Kit manufacturer	Sponsors
Académica	(Portugal) João Alves	Lacatoni	EFAPEL
Académico de Viseu	(Portugal) Manuel Cajuda	Macron	Palácio do Gelo
Arouca	(Portugal) Quim Machado	Joma	Construções Carlos Pinho
Benfica B	(Portugal) Bruno Lage	Adidas	Emirates
Braga B	(Portugal) Wender Said	Lacatoni	
Cova da Piedade	(Portugal) Hugo Falcão	Lacatoni	
Estoril	(Portugal) Luís Freire	Nike	EuroBic
Famalicão	(Portugal) Sergio Vieira	Lacatoni	Porminho
Farense	(Portugal) Rui Duarte	Patrick	MEO
Leixões	(Portugal) Filipe Gouveia	Luanvi	Câmara Municipal de Matosinhos
Mafra	(Portugal) Filipe Martins	Lacatoni	
Oliveirense	(Portugal) Pedro Miguel	Rakso	Simoldes
Paços de Ferreira	(Portugal) Vítor Oliveira	Lacatoni	Aldro
Penafiel	(Portugal) Armando Evangelista	Macron	Restradas
Porto B	(Portugal) Rui Barros	New Balance	
Sp. Covilhã	(Portugal) Filó	Lacatoni	Natura / MB Hotels
Varzim	(Portugal) Nuno Capucho	Stadio	Carnes São José
Vitória de Guimarães B	(Portugal) Alex Costa	Macron	

=== Coaching changes ===
Team	Outgoing head coach	Manner of departure	Date of vacancy	Position in table	Incoming head coach	Date of appointment

== Season summary ==
=== League table ===
Pos	Team	Pld	W	D	L	GF	GA	GD	Pts	Promotion or relegation
1	Paços de Ferreira (C, P)	34	23	5	6	50	21	+29	74	Promotion to Primeira Liga
2	Famalicão (P)	34	21	6	7	57	34	+23	69	Promotion to Primeira Liga
3	Estoril	34	16	6	12	49	42	+7	54	
4	Benfica B	34	15	7	12	47	42	+5	52	
5	Académica	34	15	6	13	36	37	−1	51	
6	Sp. Covilhã	34	13	10	11	42	37	+5	49	
7	Leixões	34	12	9	13	35	36	−1	45	
8	Penafiel	34	13	6	15	49	48	+1	45	
9	Porto B	34	11	11	12	41	42	−1	44	
10	Farense	34	11	10	13	39	35	+4	43	
11	Académico de Viseu	34	12	7	15	49	54	−5	43	
12	Oliveirense	34	11	10	13	44	49	−5	43	
13	Cova da Piedade	34	11	9	14	25	42	−17	42	
14	Mafra	34	10	11	13	40	44	−4	41	
15	Varzim	34	11	8	15	25	37	−12	41	
16	Arouca (R)	34	10	10	14	40	45	−5	40	Relegation to Campeonato de Portugal
17	Braga B (R)	34	11	4	19	38	45	−7	37	Relegation to Campeonato de Portugal
18	Vitória de Guimarães B (R)	34	6	13	15	41	57	−16	31	Relegation to Campeonato de Portugal

Source: Liga Portugal
Rules for classification: 1) Points; 2) Head-to-head points; 3) Head-to-head goal difference; 4) Head-to-head away goals scored; 5) Goal difference; 6) Matches won; 7) Goals scored; 8) Play-off.
(Note: The LPFP decided that only criteria 1, 5, 6 and 7 would be applied to establish the classification during the competition.)
(C) Champions; (P) Promoted; (R) Relegated

== Attendances ==
#	Club	Average
1	Famalicão	3,478
2	Paços	2,772
3	Académica	2,529
4	Farense	2,437
5	Varzim	1,606
6	Vitória B	1,035
7	Arouca	976
8	Cova da Piedade	965
9	Estoril	895
10	Leixões	895
11	Viseu	724
12	Benfica B	657
13	Mafra	617
14	Penafiel	594
15	Porto B	488
16	Oliveirense	486
17	Covilhã	461
18	Braga B	337
