= Bruma (footballer) =

Portuguese footballer (born 1994)

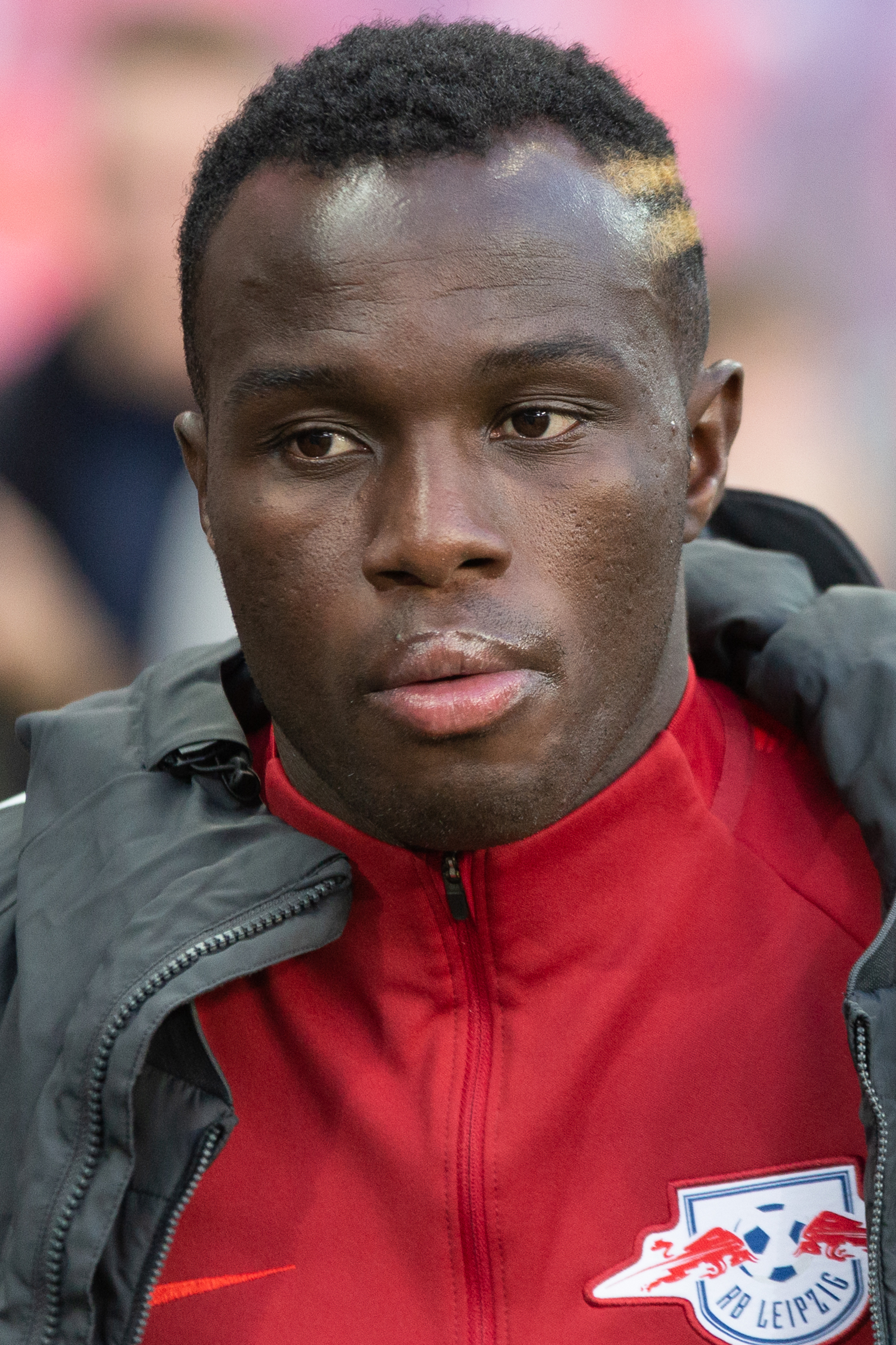
- Bruma with RB Leipzig in 2019

Personal information
- Full name: Armindo Tué Na Bangna
- Date of birth: 24 October 1994 (age 32)
- Place of birth: Bissau, Guinea-Bissau
- Height: 1.73 m (5 ft 8 in)
- Position: Winger

Team information
- Current team: Aris
- Number: 77

Youth career
- União Bissau
- 2007–2012: Sporting CP

Senior career*
Years	Team	Apps	(Gls)
2012–2013	Sporting CP B	25	(6)
2013	Sporting CP	13	(1)
2013–2017	Galatasaray	57	(12)
2014	→ Gaziantepspor (loan)	0	(0)
2015–2016	→ Real Sociedad (loan)	32	(2)
2017–2019	RB Leipzig	42	(5)
2019–2023	PSV	49	(10)
2020–2021	→ Olympiacos (loan)	22	(7)
2022–2023	→ Fenerbahçe (loan)	1	(0)
2023	Fenerbahçe	0	(0)
2023	→ Braga (loan)	16	(4)
2023–2025	Braga	43	(13)
2025–2026	Benfica	13	(1)
2026–	Aris	4	(1)

International career
2009	Portugal U15	2	(2)
2009	Portugal U16	1	(0)
2009–2011	Portugal U17	19	(6)
2010	Portugal U18	2	(1)
2010–2013	Portugal U19	33	(12)
2013	Portugal U20	6	(6)
2013–2017	Portugal U21	15	(5)
2017–2024	Portugal	12	(2)
- * Club domestic league appearances and goals as of 12:51, 18 November 2026 (UTC)

Armindo Tué Na Bangna (born 24 October 1994), known as Bruma, is a professional footballer who plays as a winger for Super League Greece club Aris. Born in Guinea-Bissau, he represented Portugal internationally.

== Club career ==
=== Sporting CP ===
Born in Bissau, Guinea-Bissau, Bruma moved to Portugal as a child, joining Sporting CP's academy before his 13th birthday. He proceeded to score more than 80 goals for the club's various youth sides.

Bruma made his senior debut in the 2012–13 season, starting with the B team in the Segunda Liga. On 6 December 2012 he netted twice against União da Madeira, but was also sent off in the 3–2 away loss.

On 10 February 2013, at the age of 18, Bruma made his official debut with the Lions' main squad, playing the first half of the 0–1 home defeat against Marítimo. He scored his first Primeira Liga goal the following matchday, the first in a 3–2 win at Gil Vicente.

=== Galatasaray ===
On 3 September 2013, following a lengthy and sour contract dispute with Sporting, ultimately resolved in the club's favour, Bruma signed a five-year deal with Turkish giants Galatasaray for €10 million. He made his debut ten days later against Antalyaspor, coming on as a substitute in the 1–1 draw.

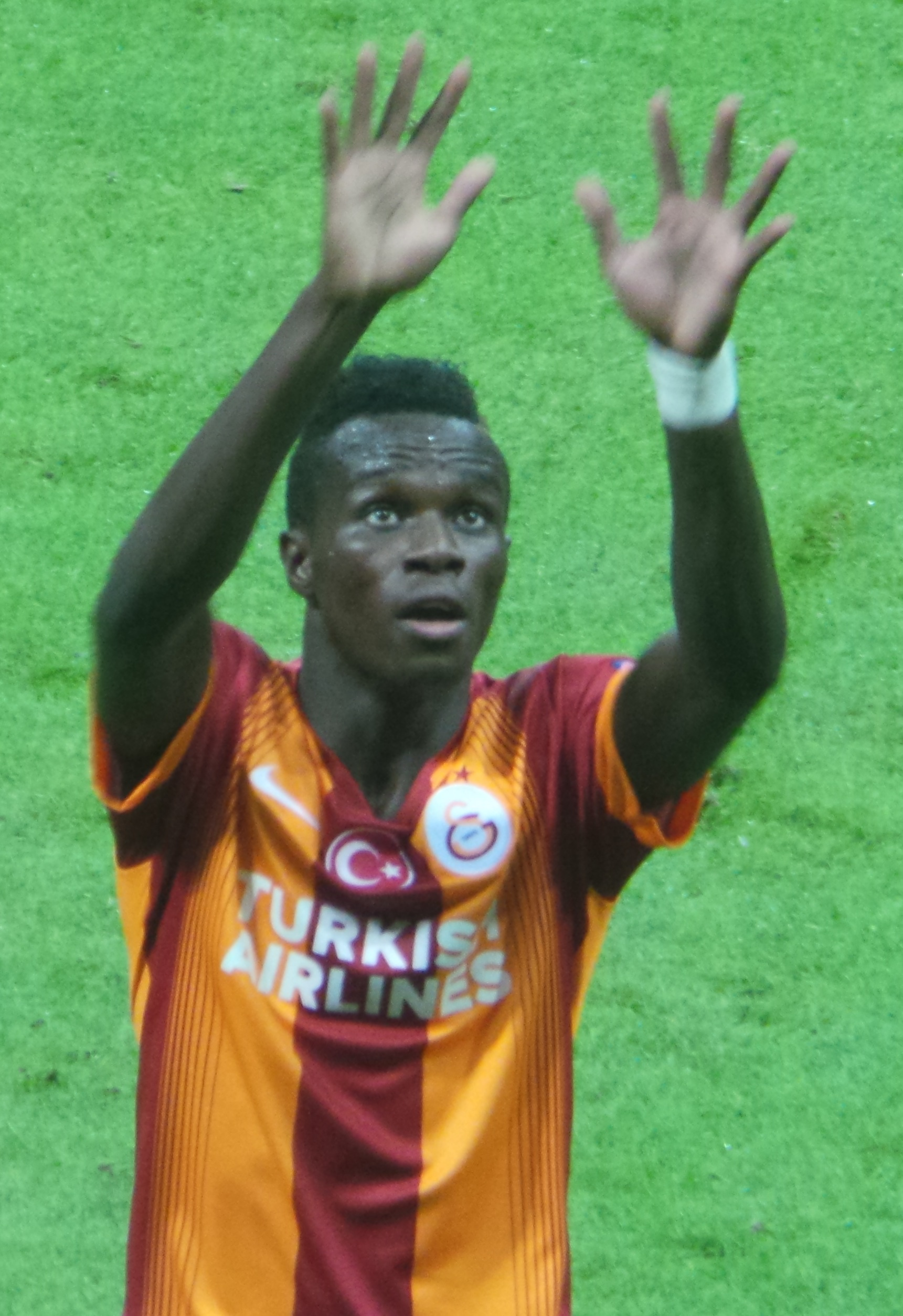
Bruma playing for Galatasaray in 2014

Bruma made his maiden UEFA Champions League appearance on 17 September 2013, playing roughly 30 minutes in a 1–6 home loss to Real Madrid in the group stage. He made his first assist for his new club in a local derby against Beşiktaş, a 2–1 away victory, and scored his first goal against Balıkesirspor on 18 December, in a 4–0 win in the campaign's Turkish Cup.

On 15 January 2014, also in the domestic cup but against Tokatspor, Bruma suffered a serious knee injury and was sidelined for most of the season. Due to this and the restriction on foreign players allowed per team, he was loaned to fellow Süper Lig side Gaziantepspor, failing to play any matches.

Bruma was loaned to Spain's Real Sociedad in the 2015 off-season, in a season-long deal. He made his La Liga debut on 22 August, starting and playing 85 minutes in a 0–0 away draw with Deportivo de La Coruña.

Bruma scored his first competitive goal for the Basques on 3 December 2015, in a 2–1 loss at Las Palmas in the Copa del Rey (3–2 aggregate). His first in the league arrived 27 days later, as he came on as an early substitute for the injured Imanol Agirretxe and netted the 1–1 equaliser against Real Madrid, but in an eventual 3–1 defeat at the Santiago Bernabéu Stadium.

=== RB Leipzig ===
On 4 June 2017, Bruma completed a €12.5m move to German club RB Leipzig, with a €2.5m bonus. He made his Bundesliga debut on 19 August, playing 15 minutes in a 2–0 away loss against Schalke 04. He scored his first goal for his new club the following weekend, helping the hosts defeat SC Freiburg 4–1.

Bruma was sparingly played by manager Ralf Rangnick during the 2018–19 season, only totalling 14 league appearances. He was also sidelined for two months, due to injury.

=== PSV ===
On 28 June 2019, Bruma signed a five-year contract at PSV Eindhoven. He made his official debut on 23 July, in a Champions League game against Basel in which he scored his first goal for the club; he repeated the feat in the second leg, but his team were eliminated on the away goals rule.

Bruma joined Olympiacos on a season-long loan on 3 October 2020, with an option to make the move permanent for €7 million the following 30 June. He scored on 11 April 2021 in a 3–1 win over Panathinaikos in the Derby of the eternal enemies, as his club won the title.

=== Fenerbahçe and Braga ===
On 20 January 2023, having started the campaign on loan, Bruma agreed to a permanent two-and-a-half-year deal at Fenerbahçe after the club exercised the option to buy his rights. Nine days later, however, he was loaned to Braga until 30 June with no option to buy. He marked his debut with a brace, scoring twice in injury time of the 4–1 home defeat of Famalicão after replacing Abel Ruiz.

Bruma signed a four-year contract at the Estádio Municipal de Braga on 14 June 2023.

=== Benfica ===
On 3 February 2025, Bruma joined Benfica on a contract until June 2028. He scored his first goal in his first start 12 days later, the only in a away win over Santa Clara.

Bruma ruptured the Achilles tendon of his left leg during the Eusébio Cup match against Fenerbahçe on 26 July 2025, being out of action for several months.

=== Later career ===
Bruma returned to Greece on 14 September 2026, on an initial one-year deal at Aris Thessaloniki.

== International career ==
Still aged 18, Bruma was part of the Portugal under-20 side that competed in the 2013 FIFA World Cup in Turkey. He was awarded the Silver Shoe as second top scorer of the tournament, scoring five times in four games in an eventual round-of-16 exit.

Bruma played his first game for the under-21s on 10 October 2013, 14 days shy of his 19th birthday, and he netted the second from a close-range header in an eventual 3–0 home win against Israel for the 2015 UEFA European Under-21 Championship qualifiers. Just two days later he was called by full side manager Paulo Bento, replacing suspended Cristiano Ronaldo for the last 2014 FIFA World Cup qualifier against Luxembourg.

Bruma won his first full cap on 10 November 2017, coming on for Gonçalo Guedes for the last 15 minutes of the 3–0 friendly victory over Saudi Arabia in Viseu. He scored his first goal the following 14 October in another exhibition game, helping to a 3–1 defeat of Scotland at Hampden Park.

On 10 November 2023, almost four years since his last appearance, new coach Roberto Martínez called Bruma for Euro 2024 qualifiers against Liechtenstein and Iceland. Six days later, he came off the bench for Ronaldo in the 67th minute of a 2–0 win at the former.

== Personal life ==
Bruma's older brother, Mesca, is also a footballer and a winger. He too played youth football for Sporting, also spending his formative years at Chelsea and Fulham.

== Career statistics ==
=== Club ===
As of match played 16 May 2026

Appearances and goals by club, season and competition
Club	Season	League			National cup (Note: Includes Turkish Cup, Copa del Rey, DFB-Pokal, KNVB Cup, Greek Cup, Taça de Portugal)		League cup (Note: Includes Taça da Liga)		Europe		Other		Total	
Club	Season	Division	Apps	Goals	Apps	Goals	Apps	Goals	Apps	Goals	Apps	Goals	Apps	Goals
Sporting CP B	2012–13	Segunda Liga	25	6	—		—		—		—		25	6
Sporting CP	2012–13	Primeira Liga	13	1	0	0	0	0	0	0	—		13	1
Galatasaray	2013–14	Süper Lig	7	0	3	1	—		5 (Note: Appearances in UEFA Champions League)	0	—		15	1
Galatasaray	2014–15	Süper Lig	20	1	8	2	—		4	0	1 (Note: Appearance in Turkish Super Cup)	0	33	3
Galatasaray	2016–17	Süper Lig	30	11	6	0	—		—		1	0	37	11
Galatasaray	Total		57	12	17	3	0	0	9	0	2	0	85	15
Gaziantepspor (Ioan)	2013–14	Süper Lig	0	0	0	0	—		—		—		0	0
Real Sociedad (loan)	2015–16	La Liga	32	2	1	1	—		—		—		33	3
RB Leipzig	2017–18	Bundesliga	28	4	1	0	—		11 (Note: Five appearances in UEFA Champions League, six appearances and three goals in UEFA Europa League)	3	—		40	7
RB Leipzig	2018–19	Bundesliga	14	1	2	0	—		11 (Note: Appearances in UEFA Europa League)	2	—		27	3
RB Leipzig	Total		42	5	3	0	0	0	22	5	0	0	67	10
PSV	2019–20	Eredivisie	18	3	2	0	—		10 (Note: Two appearances and two goals in UEFA Champions League, eight appearances in UEFA Europa League)	2	1 (Note: Appearance in Johan Cruyff Shield)	0	31	5
PSV	2020–21	Eredivisie	3	0	0	0	—		1	0	—		4	0
PSV	2021–22	Eredivisie	28	7	3	1	—		15 (Note: Five appearances and one goal in UEFA Champions League, five appearances and one goal in UEFA Europa League, five appearances in UEFA Europa Conference League)	2	0	0	46	10
PSV	Total		49	10	5	1	0	0	26	4	1	0	81	15
Olympiacos (loan)	2020–21	Super League Greece	22	7	5	2	—		6 (Note: Two appearances in UEFA Champions League, four appearances in UEFA Europa League)	0	—		33	9
Fenerbahçe (loan)	2022–23	Süper Lig	1	0	0	0	—		4 (Note: Two appearances in UEFA Champions League, two appearances in UEFA Europa League)	0	—		5	0
Braga (loan)	2022–23	Primeira Liga	16	4	3	0	0	0	2 (Note: Appearances in UEFA Europa Conference League)	0	—		21	4
Braga	2023–24	Primeira Liga	26	6	0	0	2	0	10 (Note: Nine appearances and five goals in UEFA Champions League, one appearance in UEFA Europa League)	5	—		38	11
Braga	2024–25	Primeira Liga	17	7	1	1	2	1	11	3	—		31	12
Braga	Braga total		59	17	4	1	4	1	23	8	0	0	90	27
Benfica	2024–25	Primeira Liga	10	1	3	0	—		0	0	1 (Note: Appearance in FIFA Club World Cup)	0	14	1
Benfica	2025–26	Primeira Liga	3	0	0	0	0	0	0	0	0	0	3	0
Benfica	Total		13	1	3	0	0	0	0	0	1	0	17	1
Career total			313	61	38	8	4	1	90	17	4	0	449	87

=== International ===
Appearances and goals by national team and year
National team	Year	Apps	Goals
Portugal	2017	2	0
Portugal	2018	5	1
Portugal	2019	2	0
Portugal	2023	2	0
Portugal	2024	1	1
Total		12	2

Scores and results list Portugal's goal tally first, score column indicates score after each Bruma goal.

List of international goals scored by Bruma
No.	Date	Venue	Opponent	Score	Result	Competition
1	14 October 2018	Hampden Park, Glasgow, Scotland	Scotland	3–0	3–1	Friendly
2	21 March 2024	Estádio D. Afonso Henriques, Guimarães, Portugal	Sweden	4–0	5–2	Friendly

== Honours ==
Galatasaray

- Süper Lig: 2014–15
- Turkish Cup: 2013–14, 2014–15
- Turkish Super Cup: 2016

Olympiacos

- Super League Greece: 2020–21

PSV

- KNVB Cup: 2021–22
- Johan Cruyff Shield: 2021

Braga

- Taça da Liga: 2023–24

Individual

- Segunda Liga Breakthrough Player of the Year: 2012–13
- FIFA U-20 World Cup Silver Shoe: 2013
- UEFA European Under-21 Championship Bronze Boot: 2017
- Super League Greece Player of the Month: April 2021
- Eredivisie Player of the Month: August 2021
- Eredivisie Team of the Month: August 2021
