= Joeano =

Brazilian footballer

Personal information
- Full name: Joeano Pinto Chaves
- Date of birth: 12 August 1979 (age 47)
- Place of birth: Fortaleza, Brazil
- Height: 1.76 m (5 ft 9 1/2 in)
- Position: Striker

Senior career*
Years	Team	Apps	(Gls)
1999	Fortaleza		
1999–2000	Arrifanense	22	(1)
2000–2002	Esmoriz		
2002–2003	Sanjoanense	36	(29)
2003	Salamanca	8	(1)
2004–2006	Académica	62	(20)
2006–2008	Beitar Jerusalem	15	(3)
2007–2008	→ Académica (loan)	31	(7)
2008–2009	Vitória Setúbal	7	(0)
2009–2011	Ermis	55	(35)
2011–2013	Arouca	62	(43)
2013–2014	Rio Ave	14	(1)
2015–2016	Anadia	24	(17)
2016	União Leiria	7	(2)
2016–2018	Pampilhosa	37	(19)
2018	Vigor Mocidade	10	(6)
Total		390	(184)
- * Club domestic league appearances and goals

Joeano Pinto Chaves (born 12 August 1979), known simply as Joeano, is a Brazilian former professional footballer who played as a striker.

== Club career ==
Born in Fortaleza, Ceará, Joeano moved to Portugal, where he would remain for the majority of his career, at the age of 20, signing with amateurs C.D. Arrifanense from local Fortaleza Esporte Clube. In the 2002–03 season he scored 29 goals with third division club A.D. Sanjoanense, helping his team rank ninth and attracting the attention of UD Salamanca of the Spanish second level.

In the 2004 January transfer window, however, Joeano returned to Portugal and signed for Académica de Coimbra, netting six times in only 13 games to help the side avoid relegation from the Primeira Liga. In summer 2006, after having scored 12 goals for the Students in his second full campaign, he joined Beitar Jerusalem F.C. in Israel.

After failing to meet expectations at the Teddy Kollek Memorial Stadium, Joeano returned to his previous club in January 2007, on loan, with Académica also agreeing to pay half of his salary. On 4 February he played his first league match, coming on as a 32nd-minute substitute and scoring the only goal of the away fixture against Associação Naval 1º de Maio with eight to go.

Joeano played two seasons in Cyprus with Ermis Aradippou FC, netting a career-best in the professionals 22 goals in 2009–10 (a competition joint-best). In the 2011 offseason, after the team's relegation from the First Division, he returned to Portugal and signed for F.C. Arouca in the second tier.
