= Bruno Moura =

Portuguese footballer

Personal information
- Full name: Bruno Carlos Moura Gomes
- Date of birth: 29 September 1993 (age 33)
- Place of birth: Portugal
- Positions: Defender; midfielder

Team information
- Current team: Zimbru

Youth career
- Racing Union Luxembourg

Senior career*
Years	Team	Apps	(Gls)
- Catujalense
2013–2015	Sandweiler		
2015–2017	Les Aiglons Dalheim		
2017–2018	Résidence Walferdange		
2019	UCE Liège II		
2019–2020	Lorentzweiler		
2020–	Zimbru	4	(0)
- * Club domestic league appearances and goals

Bruno Carlos Moura Gomes (born 29 September 1993) is a Portuguese footballer who plays as a defender or midfielder for Zimbru.

== Career ==
In 2011, Moura moved to Luxembourg with his family and joined the youth academy of Racing Union Luxembourg after playing for Catujalense in the Portuguese lower leagues.

In 2019, he signed for Belgian seventh division club UCE Liège II after moving to the city to study engineering.

In 2020, he signed for Zimbru in Moldova after playing for the Luxembourgish lower league team Lorentzweiler.
