= Quim Machado =

Portuguese footballer and manager

Personal information
- Full name: Joaquim Machado Gonçalves
- Date of birth: 10 October 1966 (age 60)
- Place of birth: Santo Tirso, Portugal
- Height: 1.80 m (5 ft 11 in)
- Position: Right-back

Youth career
- 1982–1983: Porto
- 1983–1985: Tirsense

Senior career*
Years	Team	Apps	(Gls)
1985–1989	Tirsense	25	(0)
1989–1991	Braga	58	(0)
1991–1994	Vitória Guimarães	46	(2)
1994–1995	Estrela Amadora	32	(0)
1995–1997	Chaves	56	(0)
1997–1998	Varzim	31	(0)
1998–1999	Campomaiorense	32	(0)
1999–2000	Maia	11	(0)
2000	Aves	7	(0)
2000–2001	Tirsense		
2001–2003	Dudelange	22	(4)
Total		320	(6)

Managerial career
- 2004–2006: Oliveirense
- 2006–2010: Tirsense
- 2010–2012: Feirense
- 2012: Vasas
- 2012–2013: Feirense
- 2013–2014: Chaves
- 2014: Lechia Gdańsk
- 2014–2015: Tondela
- 2015–2016: Vitória Setúbal
- 2016: Santa Clara
- 2016–2017: Belenenses
- 2017–2018: Al Batin
- 2018: Académica
- 2018–2019: Arouca
- 2020: Vilafranquense
- 2022–2023: Al-Orobah
- 2023–2024: Al Batin
- 2025: Al-Hussein
- * Club domestic league appearances and goals

Joaquim Machado Gonçalves (born 10 October 1966), known as Quim Machado, is a Portuguese former professional footballer who played as a right-back, currently a manager.

In his playing days, he achieved Primeira Liga totals of 255 games in the 1990s, in representation of six clubs. He began work as a manager in the following decade, leading three teams in the top tier.

== Playing career ==
Born in Santo Tirso, Porto District, Machado began his senior career with local Tirsense in 1985, competing in the Segunda Liga with the club. Subsequently, over one decade and always in the Primeira Liga, he represented Braga, Vitória de Guimarães, Estrela da Amadora, Chaves, Varzim and Campomaiorense; with the second team, he appeared in four complete games in the 1992–93 UEFA Cup, helping dispose of Real Sociedad in the first round (3–2 on aggregate).

Machado returned to the second division for his last seasons, playing for Maia and Aves. He also spent one year in lower league football with first team Tirsense, before retiring altogether at nearly 37 with Dudelange in Luxembourg.

== Coaching career ==
Machado began his coaching career in 2004, with amateurs Oliveirense. He moved to Tirsense also in division four two years later, promoting to the third tier at the first attempt and going on to achieve a further three top-four finishes.

Machado signed with second division club Feirense in June 2010, winning promotion at the end of his first season and returning the Azuis da Feira to the top flight after 23 years. He was relieved of his duties on 2 April 2012 due to poor results, and the team was ultimately relegated as 15th. In July, he was appointed at Hungary's Vasas, only to return to his previous job after a mere two months.

In October 2013, Machado signed for Chaves in the same league. On 16 June of the following year, he was appointed at Ekstraklasa side Lechia Gdańsk, leaving in September due to poor results.

In the 2014–15 campaign, Machado led Tondela to the second-tier championship, with the subsequent first-ever promotion to the top flight. On 18 May 2016, after having narrowly avoided relegation from the latter competition with Vitória de Setúbal, he resigned.

On 24 September 2016, Machado was appointed at second division's Santa Clara after Daniel Ramos moved to Marítimo. After only two games, he left for family reasons and signed for Belenenses of the top tier on 6 October. He left the Estádio do Restelo the following 17 April, in disagreement with a proposed new contract that would limit his influence over the club's transfer business.

Machado then went back abroad with Al Batin in the Saudi Professional League, who sacked him in February 2018 when they were in 19th place. He returned to his country's second division on 2 April, taking the helm at Académica de Coimbra after Ricardo Soares's departure. He won four of his seven matches in charge, and resumed his career on 27 September that year at last-placed Arouca.

Having left Arouca after their May 2019 relegation, Machado was linked to South Korea's K League 1, but nothing came of it. A year later, he returned to work in his country's second division with Vilafranquense. He lost his job on 26 October 2020, with the team second-bottom after seven games.

On 6 June 2022, Machado returned to Saudi Arabia with First Division League's Al-Orobah. He went back to Al Batin in September 2023.

In June 2025, Machado was appointed as manager of Jordanian Pro League club Al-Hussein. Six months later, his contract was terminated.

== Managerial statistics ==
As of match played 25 November 2025

Managerial record by team and tenure
Team	Nat	From	To	Record				
Team	Nat	From	To	G	W	D	L	Win %
Oliveirense	(Portugal)	25 March 2004	29 May 2006	82	37	23	22	45.12
Tirsense	(Portugal)	29 May 2006	9 June 2010	135	69	37	29	51.11
Feirense	(Portugal)	9 June 2010	2 April 2012	64	22	15	27	34.38
Vasas	(Hungary)	1 July 2012	1 October 2012	10	5	3	2	50.00
Feirense	(Portugal)	3 October 2012	20 May 2013	37	15	9	13	40.54
Chaves	(Portugal)	16 October 2013	16 June 2014	34	16	9	9	47.06
Lechia Gdańsk	(Poland)	16 June 2014	21 September 2014	9	3	3	3	33.33
Tondela	(Portugal)	7 October 2014	27 May 2015	38	18	14	6	47.37
Vitória Setúbal	(Portugal)	29 May 2015	18 May 2016	38	8	13	17	21.05
Santa Clara	(Portugal)	24 September 2016	6 October 2016	2	1	0	1	50.00
Belenenses	(Portugal)	6 October 2016	17 April 2017	27	7	8	12	25.93
Al Batin	(Saudi Arabia)	24 May 2017	4 February 2018	22	7	6	9	31.82
Académica	(Portugal)	2 April 2018	13 May 2018	7	4	0	3	57.14
Arouca	(Portugal)	27 September 2018	22 May 2019	32	11	10	11	34.38
Vilafranquense	(Portugal)	25 May 2020	26 October 2020	8	2	3	3	25.00
Al-Orobah	(Saudi Arabia)	6 June 2022	1 June 2023	34	11	7	16	32.35
Al Batin	(Saudi Arabia)	13 September 2023	1 March 2024	20	7	5	8	35.00
Al-Hussein	(Jordan)	14 June 2025	12 December 2025	15	9	2	4	60.00
Career totals				614	252	167	195	41.04
