= Complexo Desportivo da Covilhã =

Multi-use stadium in Portugal

Coordinates: 40.2648893°N 7.4978685°W

- Interactive map of Complexo Desportivo da Covilhã
- Full name: Complexo Desportivo Da Covilhã
- Location: Covilhã, Portugal
- Owner: Covilhã City Hall
- Capacity: 3,000
- Surface: Grass
- Field size: 105 x 68 m

Construction
- Built: 2003; 23 years ago
- Opened: 27 July 2003

Tenant
- SC Covilhã (formerly)

Complexo Desportivo da Covilhã (Covilhã Sports Complex) is a multi-use stadium in Covilhã, Portugal. The Complexo Desportivo da Covilhã stadium holds 3,000 seats and the entire space has also infrastructure for volleyball, badminton and athletics (there's a track in the stadium). It also has several support equipment for the practice of professional and amateur sports. It was inaugurated on 27 July 2003. It has been used for football matches and was a home stadium of SC Covilhã football team for several years between 2005 and 2014.

== Portugal national team matches ==
The following national team matches were held in the stadium as preparations for the World Cup 2010.

#	Date	Score	Opponent	Competition
1.	24 May 2010	0–0	Cape Verde	Friendly
2.	1 June 2010	3–1	Cameroon	Friendly
