= Francisco Chaló =

Portuguese football manager and former player

Personal information
- Full name: Francisco Alexandre Lacerda Chaló
- Date of birth: 10 February 1964 (age 62)
- Place of birth: Ermesinde, Portugal

Youth career
- 1977–1978: Ermesinde
- 1978–1980: Porto
- 1980–1981: Vilanovense
- 1981–1982: Porto

Senior career*
Years	Team	Apps	(Gls)
1982–1983	Feirense		
1983–1984	Castêlo da Maia		
1984–1985	Candal		
1986–1996	UDR Formiga		

Managerial career
- 1995–1996: Alfenense
- 1997–2003: Pedras Rubras
- 2003–2006: Feirense
- 2007: Naval
- 2008–2009: Feirense
- 2011–2012: Penafiel
- 2013–2016: Covilhã
- 2016–2018: Académico Viseu
- 2018: Leixões
- 2018–2020: Paradou AC
- 2021–2022: Trofense
- 2022: Paradou AC
- 2023: Kazma
- * Club domestic league appearances and goals

Francisco Alexandre Lacerda Chaló (born 10 February 1964) is a Portuguese football manager and former footballer.

== Career ==
Born in Ermesinde, Porto Metropolitan Area, Chaló began managing at the district level with A.C. Alfenense and F.C. Pedras Rubras. After taking the latter to the third tier, he had three years with C.D. Feirense in the Segunda Liga. On 30 May 2007, he moved up to the Primeira Liga, succeeding Fernando Mira at Associação Naval 1º de Maio. He was dismissed on 16 September, having taken two points from four games.

Chaló then returned to Feirense in the second division for 18 months, being shown the door in December 2009 when they were fourth. On 8 March 2011, he signed with F.C. Penafiel for the rest of the season, tasked with avoiding relegation.

In March 2013, Chaló was appointed as the manager of S.C. Covilhã following Fanã's departure. After guiding them to safety, he achieved a mid-table finish in the following season. Despite interest from clubs to acquire his services, he remained with the Leões da Serra, and guided them to fourth – their best finish since the Segunda Liga's formation – in the 2014–15 season, missing out on promotion to the Primeira Liga on goal difference.

Going into the 2015–16 season, Covilhã were tipped as one of the favorites in the race for promotion, but due a run of poor results during the first half the season, his side only managed to finish in fourteenth place, 22 points less than their previous season, and he departed.

In December 2016, Chaló returned to management by signing a one-year deal with Académico de Viseu FC. He left in February 2018 after a run of seven games without a win, and took the job at Leixões S.C. of the same league days later.

In June 2018, with a year left on his contract with the club from Matosinhos, he rescinded it and joined Paradou AC of the Algerian Ligue Professionnelle 1. He left the club in August 2020.

In 2022, he returned to Paradou AC. He left after a run of poor results during the first half the season.

On 18 September 2023, Chaló was appointed as manager of Kuwait Premier League club Kazma SC. Three months later, he was sacked.

== Managerial statistics ==
As of match played 24 December 2022

Managerial record by team and tenure
Team	From	To	Record							
Team	From	To	G	W	D	L	GF	GA	GD	Win %
Feirense	11 June 2003	7 February 2006	21	5	5	11	25	36	−11	23.81
Naval	1 July 2007	16 September 2007	3	0	2	1	2	4	−2	0.00
Feirense	27 May 2008	14 December 2009	48	18	14	16	61	50	+11	37.50
Penafiel	8 March 2011	18 May 2012	50	17	14	19	64	65	−1	34.00
Covilhã	1 March 2013	30 June 2016	166	60	47	59	196	185	+11	36.14
Académico de Viseu	5 December 2016	6 February 2018	51	21	16	14	67	61	+6	41.18
Leixões	8 February 2018	28 June 2018	15	5	5	5	20	16	+4	33.33
Paradou AC	1 July 2018	30 June 2020	67	30	17	20	89	55	+34	44.78
Trofense	22 November 2021	19 April 2022	19	4	5	10	18	26	−8	21.05
Paradou AC	11 May 2022	30 December 2022	22	6	5	11	17	28	−11	27.27
Total			462	166	130	166	559	526	+33	35.93
