= Manuel Gomes (football manager) =

Portuguese footballer and manager

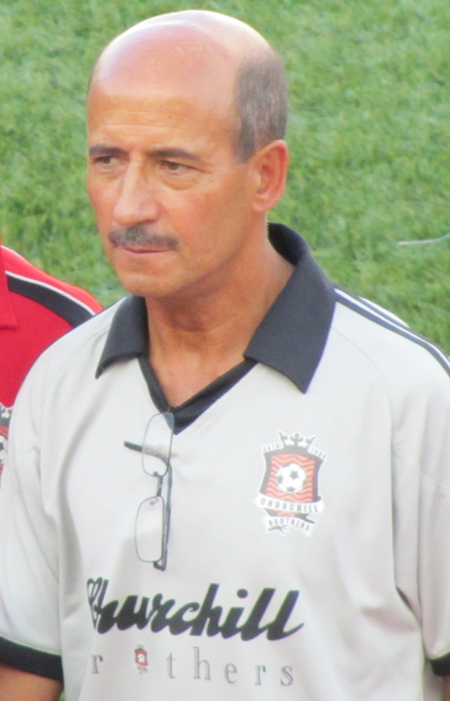
- Gomes with Churchill Brothers in 2011

Personal information
- Full name: Manuel Gonçalves Gomes
- Date of birth: 29 May 1951 (age 75)
- Place of birth: Barcelos, Portugal
- Position: Midfielder

Senior career*
Years	Team	Apps	(Gls)
1975–1976	Paredes		
1978–1980	Prado		
1980–1981	Limianos		

Managerial career
- 1979–1980: Prado
- 1981–1982: Valdevez
- 1982–1983: Desportivo das Aves
- 1984–1986: Desportivo das Aves
- 1986–1987: Fafe
- 1987–1988: Felgueiras
- 1988–1991: Tirsense
- 1991–1992: Vitória de Setúbal
- 1992: Famalicão
- 1992–1993: Paços Ferreira
- 1994: Braga
- 1994–1996: Benfica (assistant)
- 1996–1998: Angola
- 1998–2001: Desportivo das Aves
- 2001: Imortal
- 2001–2002: Penafiel
- 2002: Portugal (assistant coach)
- 2003: Hamilton Thunder
- 2003–2005: Maldives
- 2005–2007: Desportivo das Aves
- 2007–2008: Al-Salmiya SC
- 2008: Gil Vicente
- 2009: Liga Muçulmana
- 2009–2010: Estoril
- 2010–2011: Ittihad FC
- 2011–2012: Churchill Brothers
- 2012: Trofense
- 2013: Desportivo das Aves
- 2013–2014: Atlético CP
- 2015–2017: Arouca (assistant coach)
- 2017: Maccabi Tel Aviv (assistant coach)
- 2017–2018: Desportivo das Aves (assistant coach)
- 2018–2019: Vitória de Setúbal (assistant coach)
- 2019–2020: Boavista (assistant coach)
- 2020: Marítimo (assistant coach)
- * Club domestic league appearances and goals

Manuel Gonçalves Gomes (born 29 May 1951), commonly known as Professor Neca, is a Portuguese football manager and former player who played as a midfielder.

== Playing career ==
His entire playing career saw him compete for several lower league clubs between 1975 and 1981, in which he played for U.S.C. Paredes, G.D. Prado and AD Os Limianos. He began his coaching career in 1979 whilst at Prado where he had a player-coach role.

== Managerial career ==
His first ten years as manager saw him progress from the lower leagues to the top tier of Portuguese football. In the first phase of his managerial career, he managed C.A. Valdevez, C.D. Aves, A.D. Fafe, FC Felgueiras and F.C. Tirsense. Following his three-year spell with Tirsense, his next few years of his managerial career would prove to be his most successful as he would go on to manage Vitória de Setúbal, F.C. Famalicão, F.C. Paços de Ferreira and S.C. Braga. His stay with Braga, would be short lived as he would only manage Braga for ten games where they narrowly avoided relegation in the 1993–94 season.

In the summer of 1994, Neca was appointed as an assistant manager at S.L. Benfica by Artur Jorge for the 1994–95 season. Benfica's season proved to be a disappointing one as they finished behind FC Porto and Sporting CP. Despite Artur Jorge's departure midway through the 1995–96 season, Neca would remain with Benfica under the management of Mário Wilson. Benfica would go on to finish second in the league behind Porto and also capture the Taça de Portugal.

In 1996, he left his assistant managerial role at Benfica and accepted an offer by the Angolan Football Federation to coach the Angola national team. As manager of Angola, he guided the team to the 1998 African Cup of Nations. Angola was drawn against Ivory Coast, Namibia and South Africa. Angola would exit the tournament in the first round of the competition, following a third-place finish in the group phase after two draws and one loss.

He departed the Angolan national side following the African Cup of Nations where he would go on to manage several different sides in Portugal and abroad of which included C.D. Aves, Imortal DC and F.C. Penafiel. In 2003, Neca accepted an invitation to coach the Maldives national team. His spell would be unsuccessful after he failed to guide the side to the 2004 AFC Asian Cup.

He also spent a portion of the 2003 season in North America in the Canadian Professional Soccer League initially as a technical coordinator with Toronto Croatia. Midway through the 2003 season, he was named the head coach for Hamilton Thunder in early July. In his debut season in Canada, he secured the Western Conference title for Hamilton which also included a postseason berth. Hamilton was eliminated in the preliminary round of the playoffs to Vaughan Sun Devils.

After a year in charge he would leave the national side and would return to Portugal to manage Aves for the fourth time in his career. In his fourth spell in charge, he guided the side to a second-place finish in the 2005–06 Liga de Honra thus gaining promotion to the Primeira Liga. His next season proved to be a very difficult one as Aves finished bottom of the 2006–07 Primeira Liga with only twenty two points. Neca left the club following their relegation. The next three seasons would see him manage four different clubs among those included Al-Salmiya SC, Gil Vicente, Liga Muçulmana and G.D. Estoril Praia.

In June 2011, he signed a deal to coach I-League side Churchill Brothers S.C. His start as manager of Churchill Brothers proved to be successful as they captured the 2011 Durand Cup for the third team in their history in October 2011. In February 2012, following a dip in form where the club fell into fifth place, Neca was sacked as manager. He would later be replaced by Brazilian coach Carlos Roberto Pereira. In July 2012, he returned to Portugal to manage C.D. Trofense of the Liga de Honra. In December 2012, after one win in eight games, Neca was sacked as manager where he left the club in nineteenth place in the league.

In February 2013, he became the new manager of Desportivo das Aves until the end of the season.
