= Filipe Moreira =

Portuguese football manager

Personal information
- Full name: Filipe José Oliveira Moreira
- Date of birth: 30 May 1964 (age 62)
- Place of birth: Ericeira, Portugal

Youth career
- 1978–1981: Ericeirense
- 1981–1982: Mafra

Senior career*
Years	Team	Apps	(Gls)
1982–1983	Ericeirense		
1983–1984	Mafra		

Managerial career
- 1985–1986: Mafra
- 1986–1987: Lourinhanense
- 1992–1993: Santa Clara
- 1994–1996: Lourinhanense
- 1996: Machico
- 1996–1997: Santa Clara
- 1997–1998: Portimonense
- 1998–1999: Nacional
- 1999–2000: Machico
- 2000–2003: Operário
- 2003–2004: Santa Clara
- 2004: Dragões Sandinenses
- 2007: Casa Pia
- 2007–2009: Olivais Moscavide
- 2009–2010: Mafra
- 2010–2011: Tondela
- 2011–2012: Oriental
- 2012: Covilhã
- 2012–2014: Académico Viseu
- 2014: Mafra
- 2014–2016: Torreense
- 2017–2018: Sertanense
- 2018: Marinhense
- 2018: Sanjoanense
- 2019–2020: Vilafranquense
- 2020: Olhanense
- 2020–2021: Torreense
- 2021–2022: Lusitânia Lourosa
- 2022: Vitória Setúbal
- 2022: Nejmeh
- 2023: Ferroviário Maputo
- 2023: Paris 13 Atletico
- 2023–2024: Sintrense
- 2024: Anadia
- 2024: 1. SC Znojmo
- 2024–2025: Al-Tadamon
- * Club domestic league appearances and goals

Filipe José Oliveira Moreira (born 30 May 1964) is a Portuguese football manager.

His career of four decades began at age 21 with Mafra, where he was manager in three spells. He led Santa Clara, Covilhã, Académico Viseu and Vilafranquense in the second tier, having won promotion with the last two teams. In the 2020s, he had brief spells with clubs in Lebanon, Mozambique, France, the Czech Republic and Kuwait.

== Career ==
=== Early career ===
Born in Ericeira in the Lisbon District, Moreira was a youth and senior footballer at local G.D.U. Ericeirense and C.D. Mafra before becoming the latter's manager at age 21. In October 2003, having been at C.D. Santa Clara as sporting director, he succeeded José Mota as manager of the Segunda Liga club.

=== Covilhã ===
In June 2012, having managed several lower-league clubs in the interval, Moreira returned to the second tier with S.C. Covilhã, the team having been reinstated in the league due to U.D. Leiria's registration issues. He left on 13 November with the club in 18th, having won twice and lost five times in 13 games, as well as being eliminated from the Taça de Portugal and Taça da Liga.

=== Académico Viseu ===
Hours after leaving his previous job, Moreira was hired at Académico de Viseu F.C. who were 7th in the league below. He helped the club to promotion in April 2013, in his first season. On 30 December he resigned, with the team in 19th and lacking an away win.

=== Vilafranquense and others ===
On 7 April 2014, Moreira returned for a third spell at Mafra. Having left A.D. Sanjoanense in October 2018, he was hired at U.D. Vilafranquense the following 4 March, replacing Vasco Matos. He led the team from Vila Franca de Xira to the second tier for the first time, defeating Leiria on penalties; his side lost the final to Casa Pia A.C. on the same method, and he wore a tuxedo on the touchline.

Moreira left 16th-placed Vilafranquense on 3 February 2020. The team were one point above the relegation and on an eight-game winless streak. Before the end of the month, he dropped down a league to become S.C. Olhanense's third manager of the season. In 2020–21 he was manager of S.C.U. Torreense for the second time, leading the club from Torres Vedras to promotion to the new Liga 3.

Remaining in the third tier, Moreira was hired at Lusitânia Lourosa for the following campaign. He left by mutual accord on 3 February 2022 after 15 rounds of fixtures, with the team three points from the promotion places with a game in hand. Eleven days later he was appointed at Vitória de Setúbal in the same league, as their third manager of the season. He left when his contract expired at the end of the season, having missed out on promotion by winning three times and losing four times in nine games.

=== Years abroad ===
Moreira had the first foreign experience of his career in November 2022, at Nejmeh SC in the Lebanese Premier League. He led his team to a goalless draw away to Tadamon Sour SC in his first game on 27 November, and resigned two days later due to his mother's ill health.

On 18 January 2023, Moreira was hired at Clube Ferroviário de Maputo in the Moçambola. A month later, he moved to Paris 13 Atletico, 17th-placed in France's third-tier Championnat National. He was the club's third manager of a season that ended with relegation.

Moreira managed Anadia F.C. in 2023–24, helping them avoid relegation from Liga 3. He then led 1. SC Znojmo FK of the Czech third-tier Moravian-Silesian Football League for ten days before being enlisted by Al-Tadamon SC of the Kuwait Premier League in October 2024. He was dismissed on 11 March, having secured a top-six finish but been beaten 5–0 by Kuwait SC in the preliminary round of the Kuwait Crown Prince Cup.
