= Filó =

Portuguese footballer & coach (born 1972)

Personal information
- Full name: Filipe André Paula da Rocha
- Date of birth: 19 May 1972 (age 54)
- Place of birth: Espinho, Portugal
- Height: 1.90 m (6 ft 3 in)
- Position: Centre-back

Youth career
- 1985–1989: Espinho

Senior career*
Years	Team	Apps	(Gls)
1990–1992	Espinho	28	(0)
1992–1994	Fiães	19	(6)
1994–1999	Espinho	116	(6)
1999–2001	Penafiel	53	(4)
2001–2004	Paços Ferreira	41	(0)
2004–2006	Espinho	10	(0)

Managerial career
- 2006–2007: Lousada
- 2008–2009: Fiães
- 2008: Pombal
- 2008: Paredes
- 2010: Aliados Lordelo
- 2010–2012: Espinho
- 2012: Naval
- 2014–2015: Freamunde
- 2016: União Madeira
- 2018: Aves U23
- 2018–2019: Covilhã
- 2019: Paços Ferreira
- 2019–2021: Feirense
- 2021: Covilhã
- 2022–2023: Penafiel
- 2024: Oliveirense
- * Club domestic league appearances and goals

Filipe André Paula da Rocha (born 19 May 1972), known as Filó, is a Portuguese former footballer who played as a centre-back, and a current manager.

He played mostly for Espinho, while also representing Paços de Ferreira in the Primeira Liga and Penafiel in the second tier. As a manager, he briefly led Paços in the top flight in 2019, and worked with seven teams in the second division.

== Playing career ==
Born in Espinho, Filó spent most of his career in three spells with hometown club S.C. Espinho, totalling 66 Primeira Liga games and one goal for them and F.C. Paços de Ferreira. Most of his career was in the second tier, with 178 games and 9 goals for Espinho and F.C. Penafiel.

== Coaching career ==
In 2006, Filó began coaching A.D. Lousada in the third tier, and remained at that level or lower in subsequent seasons. On 4 April 2012 he was given his first professional job at Associação Naval 1º de Maio, 4th-placed in the second tier.

After a full season in charge of S.C. Freamunde also in the second division, he resigned in August 2015 after not winning any of the first three games of the new campaign. On 21 June 2016, he was appointed at newly relegated C.F. União. Six months later he was dismissed with the team in 17th, having lost eight out of 20 games, and replaced by José Viterbo.

After working at C.D. Aves' under-23 team, Filó returned to the senior game on 13 October 2018, succeeding Dito at S.C. Covilhã. He took the team to sixth place in his only season before leaving to former club Paços de Ferreira – newly promoted to the Primeira Liga – in May 2019. After four games – a draw and three losses, one goal scored and eight conceded – he lost his job on 1 September.

On 12 November 2019, Filó returned to the second tier, succeeding Filipe Martins at 12th-placed C.D. Feirense. After finishing the season six points behind promoted S.C. Farense, he was given a new contract in July 2020.

In January 2021, Filó was given a 15-day suspension and a €1,785 fine for threatening the fourth official at half-time against U.D. Oliveirense. He was dismissed on 29 March after a four-game winless streak, though the team were in third.

On 2 October 2021, Filó returned to Covilhã. He managed for just four games – split equally between draws and losses – before resigning on 30 November due to a relative's ill health.

On 5 January 2022, Filó was announced as the new head coach of Penafiel, who were 8th in the second tier. On 1 June, having finished in 7th, he renewed for another year. He was dismissed on 30 January 2023, with the team in 12th after 17 games and seven points above the relegation places.

Filó was hired at U.D. Oliveirense on 19 October 2024, replacing Marco Leite at the team who were second-last in the second tier having earned five points from seven games. He left by mutual consent on 14 December, having added only one more point from his six fixtures.
