= Micael Sequeira =

Portuguese football manager

Personal information
- Full name: Micael Martins Sequeira
- Date of birth: 6 July 1973 (age 53)
- Place of birth: Braga, Portugal

Managerial career
- Years: Team
- 2006–2008: Braga (youth)
- 2008–2009: Arcos de Valdevez
- 2009–2010: Aves
- 2012: Famalicão
- 2013: Trofense
- 2015–2017: Merelinense
- 2017: Freamunde
- 2019–2021: Al Nassr (youth)
- 2021: Lokomotiv Tashkent
- 2022: Vitória

Micael Martins Sequeira (born 6 July 1973) is a Portuguese football manager who most recently managed Vitória.

== Career ==
In 2008, Sequeira was appointed manager of Portuguese third division side Arcos de Valdevez after managing the youth academy of Braga in the Portuguese top flight.

In 2009, he was appointed manager of Portuguese second division club Aves.

In 2012, he was appointed manager of Famalicão in the Portuguese third division.

In 2013, Sequeira was appointed manager of Portuguese second division team Trofense. After that, he was appointed manager of Merelinense in the Portuguese fourth division, helping them achieve promotion to the Portuguese third division.

In 2017, he was appointed manager of Portuguese third division outfit Freamunde. After that, Sequeira was appointed youth manager of Al Nassr in Saudi Arabia.

In 2021, he was appointed manager of Uzbekistani side Lokomotiv (Tashkent).
