= S.C. Covilhã =

Portuguese football club

Sporting da Covilhã
- Full name: Sporting Clube da Covilhã
- Nicknames: Leões da Serra (Lions of the Mountain)
- Founded: 2 June 1923; 103 years ago
- Ground: Estádio Municipal José dos Santos Pinto, Covilhã
- Capacity: 3,500
- Chairman: Marco Peba
- Manager: Dani Matos
- League: Liga 3
- 2023–24: Liga 3, 8th (Promotion play-off)
Home colours	Away colours

Sporting Clube da Covilhã, commonly known as just Sporting da Covilhã or Sp. Covilhã, is a Portuguese football club from the city of Covilhã that plays in the third-tier Liga 3. The club was founded on 2 June 1923 and became the branch number 8 of Sporting Clube de Portugal (Sporting CP). Their nickname is the Leões da Serra, meaning "Lions of the Mountain Range," due to Covilhã's location in the Serra de Estrela, the highest mountains in Portugal.

Their home ground is Estádio Municipal José dos Santos Pinto, located at approximately 900 m of altitude. However, the team plays also at the newer stadium of Complexo Desportivo da Covilhã, also in Covilhã, which holds a capacity of 3,000 spectators. Their current chairman is Marco Peba and current manager is Francisco Chaló. They have won five Second Division in 1948, 1969, 1987 (second-tier), 2002, and 2005 (third-tier). They have competed in the Portuguese First Division 15 times, and in the Portuguese Second Division 11 times (1948–49, 1958–59, 1986–87, 1996–97, 1999–00, 2002–03, 2005–06, 2008–09, 2009–10, 2010–11, 2011–12).

== Players ==
=== Current squad ===
As of 23 September 2026

Note: Flags indicate national team as defined under FIFA eligibility rules; some limited exceptions apply. Players may hold more than one non-FIFA nationality.

No.	Pos.	Nation	Player
1	GK	BRA	Gustavo Galil
2	DF	BRA	Kauan (on loan from Alverca)
4	DF	POR	Diogo Silva
5	MF	GHA	Harruna
6	MF	POR	Ângelo Barbosa
7	FW	POR	Danny (on loan from Feirense)
8	MF	POR	Ronaldo Coelho
9	FW	POR	Guilherme Silva (on loan from Mafra)
11	FW	CMR	Ekanga Ondoa (on loan from Estrela da Amadora)
12	GK	CPV	Fábio Duarte
14	FW	POR	Pedro Brito
17	MF	POR	Rui Peixoto
18	FW	POR	João Pacheco

No.	Pos.	Nation	Player
19	MF	POR	Fábio Cruz
20	MF	POR	João Cruz
22	DF	POR	Edu Silva
23	DF	POR	Emerson Gomes
24	DF	POR	Rodrigo Mendes
25	FW	CIV	Isaac
45	DF	CIV	Mohamed Aidara
74	DF	POR	Tiago Lemos
80	MF	POR	Gonçalo Cascalheira
96	FW	GBS	Jailson
99	FW	SEN	Cheick Niang
—	MF	POR	Tomás Silva (on loan from Académico de Viseu)
—	FW	POR	Martim Peixoto (on loan from Sporting CP)

== Honours ==
- Portuguese Cup – Runners-up (1) – 1956–1957

== Managerial history ==
- (Portugal) Vieira Nunes (1985–1988)
- (Portugal) Félix Mourinho (1989–1990)
- (Portugal) Vieira Nunes (1995–1996)
- (Portugal) António Jesus (1996–1997)
- (Portugal) Vieira Nunes (1997)
- (Portugal) António Jesus (1999–2000)
- (Portugal) Henrique Nunes (2000–2001)
- (Portugal) João Cavalero (2002–2004)
- (Portugal) Fanã (2004–2005)
- (Portugal) José Dinis (2005–2006)
- (Portugal) João Salcedas (2006)
- (Portugal) Vítor Quinha (2006–2007)
- (Portugal) Rui França (2007–2008)
- (Portugal) Álvaro Magalhães (2008)
- (Portugal) Hélio Sousa (2008–2009)
- (Portugal) João Eusébio (2009)
- (Portugal) Nicolau Vaquero (2009–2010)
- (Portugal) João Salcedas (2010)
- (Portugal) João Pinto (2010–2011)
- (Portugal) Tulipa (2011–2012)
- (Portugal) Nascimento (2012)
- (Portugal) Filipe Moreira (2012)
- (Portugal) Fanã (2012–2013)
- (Portugal) Francisco Chaló (2013–2016)
- (Portugal) Filipe Gouveia (2016–2017)
- (Portugal) José Augusto (2017–2018)
- (Portugal) Dito (2018)
- (Portugal) Filó (2018–2019)
- (Portugal) Ricardo Soares (2019)
- (Mozambique) Daúto Faquirá (2019–2020)
- (Portugal) Capucho (2020–2021)
- (Portugal) José Bizarro (2021)
- (Brazil) Wender (2021)
- (Portugal) Filó (2021)
- (Portugal) Leonel Pontes (2021–2022)
- (Portugal) Alex (2022–2024)
- (Portugal) Francisco Chaló (2024–)

== Club anthem ==
De verde e branco, Um dia te embriagaram;
De verde engalanaram, Os teus pés.
O branco escorreu-te, Das feições,
Onde moras, E onde mostras o que és! e Entre os maiores
Te sentes piqueno, Mas és na Beira
Rico em tradições, Agarra que te vem
De seres leão, Já tem feito tremer
Os aldeões!

Pelos anos contados, És velhinho, Mas continuas sempre
A ser um jovenzinho; D`esperança
Traçaram teu carinho, Força e coragem
O que te moem, O ar que te embriaga
Puro e leve, Te inspira e te dá fecundidade?
Que seja lema teu, Por toda a vila
A grandeza, leite Gresso, A humidade

== League and cup history ==
Season	Div.	Pos.	Pl.	W	D	L	GS	GA	P	Cup	League Cup	Notes
1948–49	1D	11	26	9	2	15	50	59	20	Semi Finals		
1949–50	1D	6	26	10	5	11	55	70	25			
1950–51	1D	6	26	13	0	13	62	53	26	Round 1		
1951–52	1D	6	26	10	5	11	35	52	25	Quarter Finals		
1952–53	1D	10	26	7	6	13	38	54	20	Quarter Finals		
1953–54	1D	7	26	10	8	8	43	39	28	Round 1		
1954–55	1D	12	26	8	4	14	32	53	20	Round 1		
1955–56	1D	5	26	11	7	8	52	44	29	Round 1		
1956–57	1D	13	26	7	4	15	33	62	18	Runners-up		Relegated
1958–59	1D	8	26	9	4	13	43	65	22	Round 1		
1959–60	1D	9	26	8	6	12	32	49	22	Round 3		
1960–61	1D	9	26	8	5	13	27	55	21	Round 1		
1961–62	1D	13	26	6	5	15	30	48	17	Round 1		Relegated
1985–86	1D	16	30	5	7	18	23	61	17	Round 2		Relegated
1986–87	2D	1	–	–	–	–	–	–	–	Round 6		Promoted
1987–88	1D	20	38	5	11	22	30	70	21	Round 5		Relegated
1989–90	2DS	10	34	15	3	16	39	43	33	Round 2		
1990–91	2DS	16	34	6	10	18	31	47	22	Round 2		
1991–92	2DS	9	38	14	11	13	42	38	39	Round 3		Relegated
1992–93	3DS	2	34	21	7	6	53	19	49	Round 2		Promoted
1993–94	2DS	16	34	6	14	14	35	48	26	Round 2		Relegated
1994–95	3DS	2	34	22	7	5	62	22	51	Round 2		Promoted
1995–96	2DS	1	34	22	7	5	53	24	73	Round 3		Promoted
1996–97	2H	16	34	9	11	14	30	41	38	Round 3		Relegated
1997–98	2DS	2	34	20	7	7	67	26	67	Round 2		
1998–99	2DS	1	34	19	10	5	49	27	67	Round 4		Promoted
1999–2000	2H	18	34	5	10	19	23	48	25	Round 5		Relegated
2000–01	2DS	2	36	23	9	4	68	23	78	Round 3		
2001–02	2DS	1	38	23	11	4	64	26	80	Round 2		Promoted
2002–03	2H	11	34	11	12	11	37	33	45	Round 6		
2003–04	2H	17	34	8	5	21	39	55	29	Round 4		Relegated
2004–05	2DS	1	36	19	12	5	61	32	69	Round 3		Promoted
2005–06	2H	14	34	10	12	12	37	42	42	Round 5		Relegated
2006–07	2DS	4	26	12	7	7	48	25	43	Round 4		
2007–08	2DS	1	26	17	4	5	49	20	55	Round 3		Promoted
2008–09	2H	7	30	10	10	10	42	42	40	Round 3	First Group Stage	
2009–10	2H	14	30	7	9	14	35	49	30	Round 3	First Group Stage	
2010–11	2H	14	30	9	5	16	32	48	32	Round 2	First Group Stage	
2011–12	2H	15	30	7	11	12	22	29	32	Round 4	First Group Stage	^{[A]}

A. ^A Despite finishing in a relegation position, the club was not relegated due to União de Leiria of the Primeira Liga being relegated to the non-professional tiers of Portugal due to there financial difficulties suffered during the 2011–12 Primeira Liga season.

Last updated: 22 July 2012
Div. = Division; 1D = Portuguese League; 2H = Liga de Honra; 2DS/2D = Portuguese Second Division; 3DS = Terceira Divisão
Pos. = Position; Pl = Match played; W = Win; D = Draw; L = Lost; GS = Goal scored; GA = Goal against; P = Points
