= F.C. Penafiel =

Portuguese football club

- Full name: Futebol Clube de Penafiel
- Nicknames: Rubro-Negros (Red-and-black); Penafidelenses; Durienses
- Founded: 8 February 1951; 75 years ago
- Stadium: Estádio Municipal 25 de Abril
- Capacity: 5.230
- President: José António Reis
- Head coach: José Manuel Aira
- League: Liga Portugal 2
- 2025–26: Liga Portugal 2, 14th of 18
- Website: www.fcpenafiel.pt
Home colours	Away colours	Third colours

Futebol Clube de Penafiel (Portuguese pronunciation: [pɨnɐfiˈɛl, pe-]) is a Portuguese football club founded on 8 February 1951 and based in the city of Penafiel.

== Brief history ==
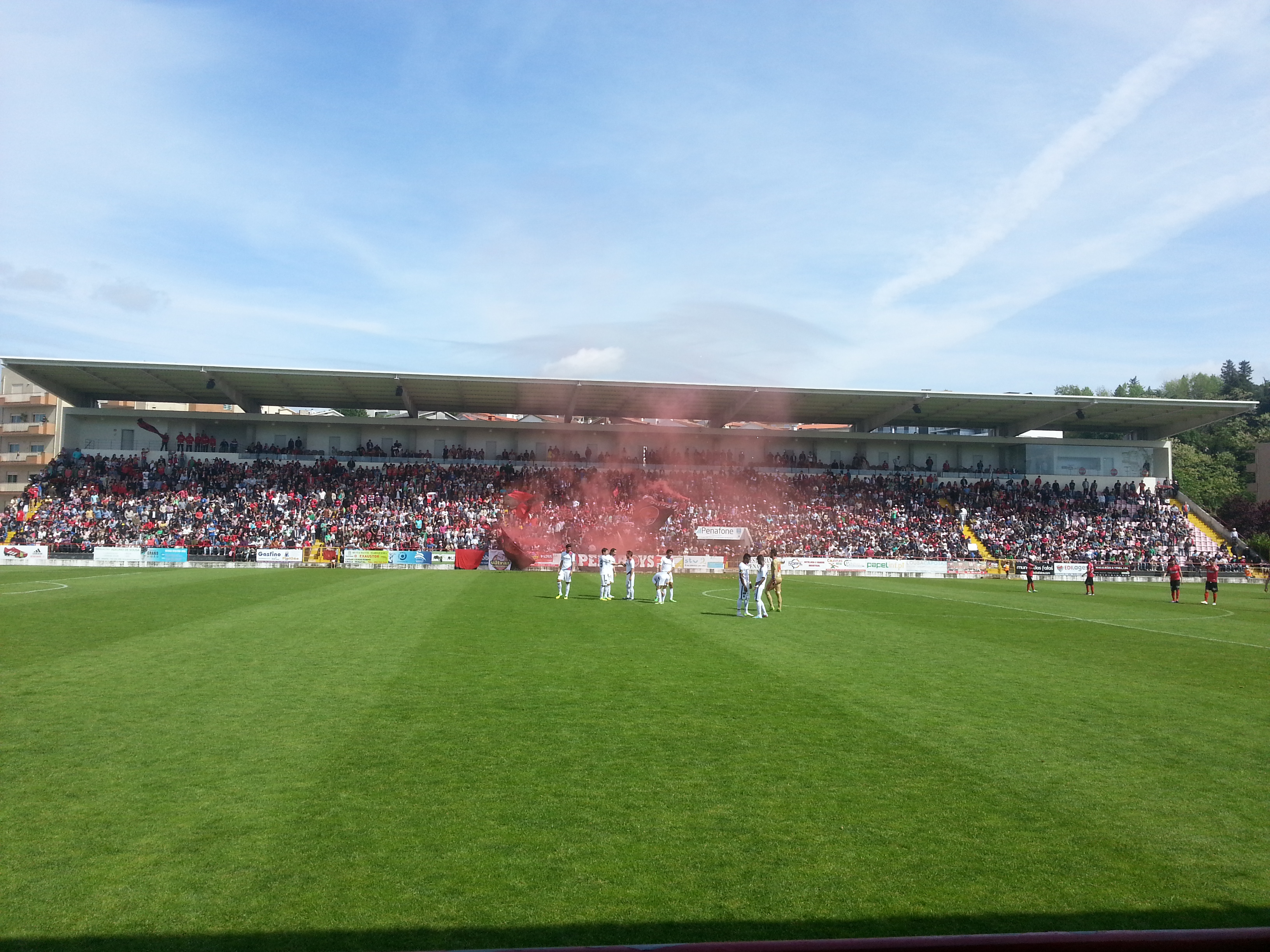
Estádio 25 Abril during a match in the 2013–14 season.

Penafiel first reached the first division in 1980–81, first lasting two seasons. They also played there from 1983 to 1986, 1987–92 and 2004–06.

In 2007–08, the club played in the second level, and eventually were relegated to the third after finishing second from bottom.

They made the semifinals of the Taça de Portugal in 1985–86, the furthest they've gone in the competition.

In 2013–14, Penafiel finished 3rd in Segunda Liga and reached Primeira Liga for the first time in 8 years, but finished 18th in 2014-15 and were relegated to Segunda Liga again in 2015–16.

== League and cup history ==
Season		Pos.	Pl.	W	D	L	GS	GA	P	Cup	League Cup	Notes
1979–80	2DN	1	30	14	13	3	43	19	41	Round 5		Promoted
1980–81	1D	10	30	11	5	14	27	38	27	Round 2		
1981–82	1D	13	30	9	5	16	20	37	23	Quarter-final		Relegated
1982–83	2DN	1	–	–	–	–	–	–	–	Round 3		Promoted
1983–84	1D	13	30	7	7	16	18	55	21	Round 2		
1984–85	1D	10	30	7	11	12	25	42	25	Round 4		
1985–86	1D	15	30	4	10	16	16	38	18	Semi-final		Relegated
1986–87	2DN	2	30	12	13	5	37	25	37	Round 4		Promoted
1987–88	1D	10	38	10	18	10	36	45	38	Quarter-final		
1988–89	1D	15	38	10	13	15	32	39	33	Round 2		
1989–90	1D	15	34	9	8	17	24	50	26	Round 4		
1990–91	1D	15	38	12	9	17	34	51	33	Round 5		
1991–92	1D	17	34	7	11	16	30	47	25	Quarter-final		Relegated
1992–93	2H	14	34	12	6	16	35	48	30	Round 6		
1993–94	2H	15	34	12	4	18	30	45	28	Round 3		
1994–95	2H	10	34	13	6	15	41	46	32	Round 4		
1995–96	2H	6	34	15	7	12	52	44	52	Quarter-final		
1996–97	2H	5	34	13	12	9	38	29	51	Round 4		
1997–98	2H	5	34	17	8	9	63	48	59	Round 6		
1998–99	2H	9	34	11	14	9	56	49	47	Round 5		
1999–00	2H	6	34	14	14	6	52	33	56	Round 4		
2000–01	2H	5	34	17	7	10	45	31	58	Round 6		
2001–02	2H	14	34	9	11	14	27	38	38	Round 5		
2002–03	2H	14	34	12	5	17	38	40	41	Round 4		
2003–04	2H	3	34	20	7	7	43	35	61	Round 5		Promoted
2004–05	1D	11	34	13	4	17	39	53	43	Round 6		
2005–06	1D	18	34	2	9	23	21	61	15	Round 4		Relegated
2006–07	2H	8	30	10	11	9	23	27	41	Round 4		
2007–08	2H	15	30	7	8	15	28	39	29	Round 5	Group Stage	Relegated
2008–09	2DS	1	22	15	5	2	31	13	50	Round 3		Promoted
2009–10	2H	7	30	10	11	9	35	34	41	Round 3	Round 1	
2010–11	2H	12	30	9	9	12	37	44	36	Round 2	Second Group Stage	
2011–12	2H	8	30	10	8	12	33	36	38	Round 4	Second Group Stage	
2012–13	2	9	42	16	12	14	48	44	60	Round 3	First Group Stage	
2013–14	2	3	42	18	19	5	47	24	73	Quarter-final	Second Group Stages	Promoted
2014–15	1	18	34	5	7	22	29	69	22	Round 5	Round 2	Relegated
2015–16	2	12	46	13	22	11	49	46	61	Round 5	Round 2	
2016–17	2	5	42	18	9	15	56	55	63	Round 5	Round 2	
2017–18	2	5	38	17	11	10	55	43	62	Round 2	Round 1	
2018–19	2	8	34	13	6	15	49	48	45	Round 4	Round 1	
2019–20	2	15	24	6	10	8	23	24	28	Round 3	Round 3 (Group Stages)	
2020-21	2	7	34	12	10	12	42	42	46	Round 3		
2021-22	2	7	34	14	9	11	38	38	51	Round 4	Round 3 (Group Stages)	

Last updated: 20 September 2022
Div. = Division; 1D = Portuguese League; 2H = Liga de Honra; 2DS/2DN = Portuguese Second Division
Pos. = Position; Pl = Match played; W = Win; D = Draw; L = Lost; GS = Goal scored; GA = Goal against; P = Points

== Honours ==
- Taça de Honra do Porto
  - Winners (1): 1981–82

== Players ==
=== Current squad ===
As of 17 September 2026

Note: Flags indicate national team as defined under FIFA eligibility rules; some limited exceptions apply. Players may hold more than one non-FIFA nationality.

No.	Pos.	Nation	Player
1	GK	POR	Miguel Oliveira
2	DF	GBS	Iano Simão
3	DF	POR	Cláudio Silva
4	DF	POR	João Miguel (captain)
5	DF	ESP	Jaime Sánchez
6	DF	ESP	Adrián Pica (on loan from Alavés)
7	DF	BRA	Douglas Borel (on loan from Santa Clara)
8	MF	ESP	Álex Carbonell
9	FW	ESP	Max Svensson
10	FW	ESP	Davo
11	FW	COL	Juanda Fuentes
12	GK	COL	Alexéi Rojas
13	GK	ESP	Eric Puerto (on loan from Deportivo La Coruña)
14	DF	ESP	Jorge Meré
17	FW	POR	João Pinto

No.	Pos.	Nation	Player
18	FW	CMR	Konrad Sinyam
21	MF	POR	Pedro Sá
22	DF	POR	Martim Alberto
23	DF	POR	Duarte Oliveira
27	DF	POR	Gonçalo Negrão
28	GK	POR	Tiago Ribeiro
29	FW	POR	Nuninho
33	FW	POR	Ricardo Schutte
38	MF	BRA	Mairlon Oliveira
50	MF	POR	Francisco Varela
61	DF	GBS	Meireles Injai
75	DF	FRA	Teddy Alloh
79	DF	POR	Tomás Teixeira
85	MF	GBS	Carlinhos Augusto
99	FW	GBS	Claudio Mendes (on loan from Casa Pia)

== Notable players ==
- (Portugal) Sérgio Conceição
- (Portugal) Jorge Costa
- (Portugal) Paulo Torres

== Coaching history ==
- (Portugal) Luís Miguel (1980)
- (Portugal) António Oliveira (1980–1981)
- (Portugal) Carlos Garcia (1981–1982)
- (Portugal) Luís Miguel (1982–1984)
- (Portugal) Manuel Barbosa (1984–1985)
- (Portugal) Fernando Cabrita (1985–1986)
- (Portugal) Luís Miguel (1986–1987)
- (Portugal) José Romão (1987–1989)
- (Portugal) Carlos Alhinho (1989)
- (Portugal) José Augusto (1989–1990)
- (Portugal) Joaquim Teixeira (1990)
- (Portugal) Vítor Manuel (1990–1992)
- (Portugal) Henrique Calisto (1992)
- (Portugal) Carlos Garcia (1992–1993)
- (Portugal) Luís Miguel (1993–1994)
- (Portugal) Henrique Nunes (1994)
- (Portugal) Jorge Regadas (1994–1999)
- (Portugal) Luís Campos (1999–2000)
- (Portugal) Ricardo Formosinho (2000–2001)
- (Portugal) Manuel Correia (2001–2002)
- (Portugal) Professor Neca (2002–2003)
- (Portugal) José Garrido (2003)
- (Brazil) Guto Ferreira (2003–2004)
- (Portugal) Miguel Leal (2004)
- (Portugal) Manuel Fernandes (2004)
- (Portugal) Luís Castro (2004–2006)
- (Portugal) Rui Bento (2006–2007)
- (Portugal) António Sousa (2007–2008)
- (Portugal) Rui Quinta (2008–2009)
- (Portugal) Bruno Cardoso (2009)
- (Angola) Lázaro Oliveira (2009–2011)
- (Portugal) José Garrido (2011)
- (Portugal) Francisco Chaló (2011–2012)
- (Portugal) Miguel Leal (2012–2014)
- (Portugal) Ricardo Chéu (2014)
- (Portugal) Rui Quinta (2014–2015)
- (Portugal) Carlos Brito (2015)
- (Portugal) Paulo Alves (2015–2017)
- (Portugal) Toni Conceição (2017)
- (Portugal) Armando Evangelista (2017–2019)
- (Portugal) Miguel Leal (2019–2020)
- (Portugal) Pedro Ribeiro (2020–2022)
- (Portugal) Filó (2022–2023)
- (Portugal) Hélder (2023-2025)
- (Spain) José Manuel Aira (2025–present)
