= 2019–20 Primeira Liga =

86th season of top-tier Portuguese football

Primeira Liga
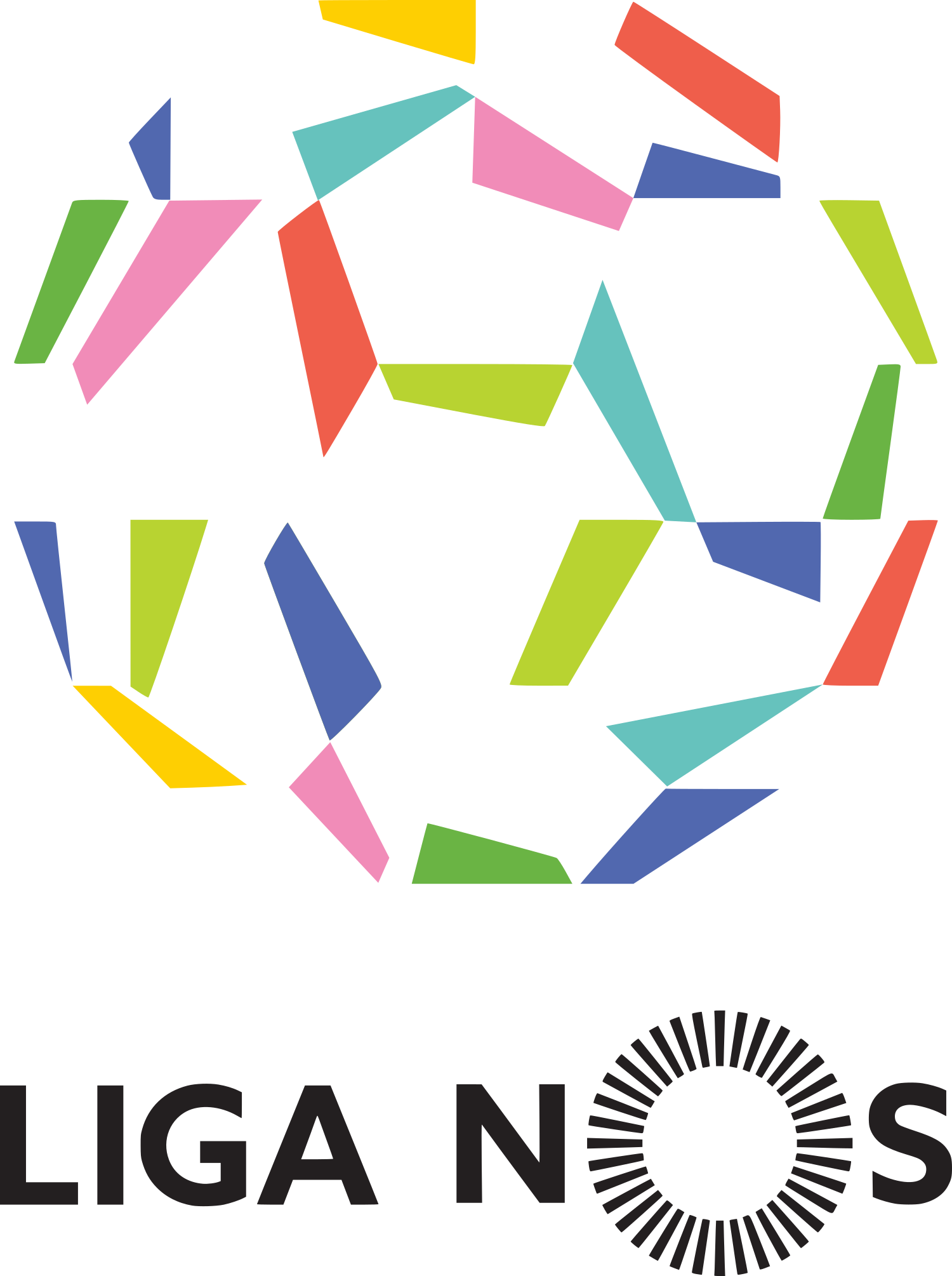
- Season: 2019–20
- Dates: 9 August 2019 – 26 July 2020
- Champions: Porto; 29th title
- Relegated: Vitória de Setubal; Desportivo das Aves
- Champions League: Porto; Benfica
- Europa League: Braga; Sporting CP; Rio Ave
- Matches: 306
- Goals: 763 (2.49 per match)
- Best player: Jesús Corona (Porto)
- Top goalscorer: Carlos Vinícius; Mehdi Taremi; Pizzi (18 goals each)
- Best goalkeeper: Agustín Marchesín (18 clean sheets)
- Biggest home win: Benfica 5–0 Paços de Ferreira (10 August 2019); Vitória de Guimarães 5–0 Belenenses SAD (30 October 2019); Porto 5–0 Belenenses SAD (5 July 2020)
- Biggest away win: Famalicão 0–7 Vitória de Guimarães (8 February 2020)
- Highest scoring: Belenenses SAD 1–7 Braga (4 January 2020)
- Longest winning run: 16 matches Benfica
- Longest unbeaten run: 16 matches Benfica
- Longest winless run: 12 matches Portimonense
- Longest losing run: 11 matches Desportivo das Aves
- Highest attendance: 62,956; Benfica 5–0 Paços de Ferreira (10 August 2019)
- Lowest attendance: Pre-spectatorless matches: (Note: All 90 matches played after 14 March 2020 were played behind closed doors without any spectators.); 821; Belenenses SAD 0–2 Rio Ave (22 September 2019)
- Attendance: 2,406,284 (7,864 per match) (Note: The average league attendance was 11,140 after 216 matches prior to fixtures being played behind closed doors.)

The 2019–20 Primeira Liga (also known as Liga NOS for sponsorship reasons) was the 86th season of the Primeira Liga, the top professional league for Portuguese association football clubs. The season started on 9 August 2019 and was finished on 26 July 2020.

Benfica were the defending champions, after winning their 37th league title in the previous season. Paços de Ferreira and Famalicão were promoted from the second-tier 2018–19 LigaPro, while Gil Vicente were promoted directly from the third-tier 2018–19 Campeonato de Portugal by court decision. They replaced Chaves, Nacional and Feirense, who were relegated to the 2019–20 LigaPro.

On 12 March 2020, the Liga Portuguesa de Futebol Profissional (LPFP) suspended the Primeira Liga due to the COVID-19 pandemic in Portugal. Following the government's approval, the league resumed play on 3 June, with matches of the remaining ten matchdays taking place behind closed doors.

On 15 July 2020, Porto secured their 29th league title with two matches remaining after defeating Sporting CP 2–0 at home.

After the end of the season, on 26 July, Desportivo das Aves and Portimonense were relegated to the 2020–21 LigaPro. However, two days later, Desportivo das Aves and Vitória de Setubal were relegated to the 2020–21 Campeonato de Portugal by decision of the Liga Portuguesa de Futebol Profissional ("LPFP") after both clubs failed to meet the necessary requirements to obtain a licence for registration to participate in professional domestic competitions.

== Effects of the COVID-19 pandemic ==
Due to the COVID-19 pandemic in Portugal, on 10 March 2020, the LPFP announced that all fixtures on matchday 24 (6–8 March) would be played behind closed doors following the Portuguese government to suspend events in open spaces with more than 5,000 people, as well as events behind closed doors with more than 1,000 participants, until 3 April. Two days later, the LPFP suspended the Primeira Liga and LigaPro until further notice because of effects of the coronavirus pandemic in Portugal. The decision was taken following the Portuguese Football Federation ("FPF")'s announcement of suspending their own non-professional football and futsal competitions and also due to an emergency meeting between the Sindicato dos Jogadores Profissionais de Futebol ("SJPF"), the LPFP and the FPF to monitor the situation, in view of the proposal to suspend all sports competitions, which the SJPF added that in case of infection, there would be an aggravated loss. Shortly after, LPFP president Pedro Proença met with several presidents of Primeira Liga's clubs to assess the impact of the stoppage of professional championships due to the COVID-19 pandemic. He revealed a COVID-19 economic support plan to support the treasury of various clubs in the Primeira Liga and LigaPro. Afterwards, the LPFP announced the creation of an Economic Impact Monitoring Group that would be responsible for presenting measures to support the clubs that competed in the Primeira Liga and LigaPro. The FPF also opened a credit line to support the finances of non-professional football and futsal clubs in the amount of one million euros to minimize the effects of the pandemic on their finances.

On 28 April, Prime Minister of Portugal António Costa reunited with the presidents of the "Big Three" clubs in Portugal (S.L. Benfica, Sporting CP and FC Porto), the president of the FPF and the president of the LPFP to discuss the conditions of the return of football in Portugal. The reunion caused some controversy for some Primeira Liga clubs such as Braga and Vitória de Guimarães, who were not satisfied that only the "Big Three" clubs were the only ones invited to the discussion, and instead believed all Primeira Liga clubs should have been invited. Two days later, António Costa approved the return of the league, with all matches being resumed behind closed doors following the consent of the Portuguese Ministry of Health.

On 11 May, it was announced that several teams in the Primeira Liga had players tested positive for COVID-19, with Benfica having a player from its reserve team to be infected, followed by three players from Famalicão, Moreirense and Vitória de Guimarães that were sent home and were isolated from the rest of their respective teams. On 20 May, LPFP president Pedro Proença president proposed that following the restart of the league, the matches played should be shown on the free-to-air television station RTP in Portugal instead of the pay TV subscriptions, with the backing of the Portuguese government. However, this proposal caused some controversy with the league's main sponsor, NOS, and several other sponsors, as well as various other clubs in the league, most notably Benfica and Porto. This prompted rumours that Proença could be forced to end his term prematurely, rumours Proença later dismissed. Later that month, Benfica left the board of LPFP due to the controversy.

On 14 May, after a meeting of all clubs, five substitutions will be permitted, which was temporarily allowed by IFAB following a proposal by FIFA to lessen the impact of fixture congestion. On 22 May, the LPFP announced that the league would be resumed on 3 June. On 27 May, it was announced that one of the assistant referees for a league match between Benfica and Marítimo had tested positive for COVID-19, leading him to be replaced by another referee for the scheduled league match.

On 30 May, the LPFP approved a plan to resume the league, but during the reunion between all clubs of the league, Marítimo refused to accept the five substitutions rules, leading the rule to be accepted on 8 June by the LPFP despite Marítimo's refusal.

== Teams ==
Eighteen teams competed in the league – the top fifteen teams from the previous season, the two teams promoted from the LigaPro (Paços de Ferreira and Famalicão) and one team promoted directly from the third-tier Campeonato de Portugal (Gil Vicente). Paços de Ferreira came back to the top division one season after being relegated, while Famalicão secured their return after a 25-year absence. Gil Vicente, having been relegated to the third-level of Portuguese football in the 2018–19 season, were reinstated in the Primeira Liga by court decision, five years after their last participation. These three teams replaced Chaves, Feirense (both relegated after three years in the top flight), and Nacional (relegated one season after their promotion).

=== Stadia and locations ===
Location of teams in 2019–20 Primeira Liga (Mainland)
Location of teams in 2019–20 Primeira Liga (Madeira)
Location of teams in 2019–20 Primeira Liga (Azores)

Team	Location	Stadium	Capacity	2018–19
Belenenses SAD	Oeiras	Estádio Nacional	37,593	9th
Benfica	Lisbon	Estádio da Luz	64,642	1st
Boavista	Porto	Estádio do Bessa	28,263	8th
Braga	Braga	Estádio Municipal de Braga	30,286	4th
Desportivo das Aves	Vila das Aves	Estádio do CD Aves	6,230	14th
Famalicão	Vila Nova de Famalicão	Estádio Municipal 22 de Junho	5,307	2nd (LP)
Gil Vicente	Barcelos	Estádio Cidade de Barcelos	12,504	*(CP)
Marítimo	Funchal	Estádio do Marítimo	10,932	12th
Moreirense	Moreira de Cónegos	Parque de Jogos Comendador; Joaquim de Almeida Freitas	6,153	6th
Paços de Ferreira	Paços de Ferreira	Estádio Capital do Móvel	9,076	1st (LP)
Portimonense	Portimão	Estádio Municipal de Portimão	6,204	11th
Porto	Porto	Estádio do Dragão	50,033	2nd
Rio Ave	Vila do Conde	Estádio dos Arcos	9,065	7th
Santa Clara	Ponta Delgada	Estádio de São Miguel	12,000	10th
Sporting CP	Lisbon	Estádio José Alvalade	50,095	3rd
Tondela	Tondela	Estádio João Cardoso	5,000	15th
Vitória de Guimarães	Guimarães	Estádio D. Afonso Henriques	30,000	5th
Vitória de Setúbal	Setúbal	Estádio do Bonfim	15,720	13th

=== Personnel and sponsors ===
Team	Manager(s)	Captain	Kit Manufacturer	Main Sponsor
Belenenses SAD	(Portugal) Petit	(Portugal) Gonçalo Silva	(Portugal) Lacatoni	(South Korea) Kia Motors
Benfica	(Portugal) Nélson Veríssimo	(Brazil) Jardel	(Germany) Adidas	(United Arab Emirates) Emirates
Boavista	(Portugal) Daniel Ramos	(Senegal) Idris	(Portugal) PlayGround Stars	(Portugal) VITO Tools
Braga	(Portugal) Artur Jorge	(Brazil) Fransérgio	(Denmark) Hummel	(Greece) Betano
Desportivo das Aves	(Portugal) Nuno Manta Santos	(Portugal) Afonso Figueiredo	(Portugal) Lacatoni	(Portugal) AMCO Credit
Famalicão	(Portugal) João Pedro Sousa	(Brazil) Rafael Defendi	(Italy) Macron	(Portugal) Porminho
Gil Vicente	(Portugal) Vítor Oliveira	(Portugal) Rúben Fernandes	(Portugal) Lacatoni	(Portugal) Las Kasas
Marítimo	(Portugal) José Gomes	(Portugal) Edgar Costa	(United States) Nike	-
Moreirense	(Portugal) Ricardo Soares	(Portugal) João Aurélio	(Portugal) CDT	-
Paços de Ferreira	(Portugal) Pepa	(Portugal) Pedrinho	(Spain) Joma	(Spain) Aldro Energy
Portimonense	(Portugal) Paulo Sérgio	(Brazil) Jadson	(Japan) Mizuno	(United States) McDonald's
Porto	(Portugal) Sérgio Conceição	(Portugal) Danilo Pereira	(United States) New Balance	(Portugal) MEO
Rio Ave	(Portugal) Carlos Carvalhal	(Portugal) Tarantini	(United States) Nike	(Portugal) MEO
Santa Clara	(Portugal) João Henriques	(Iraq) Osama Rashid	(United States) Nike	(Spain) Santander Bank
Sporting CP	(Portugal) Ruben Amorim	(Uruguay) Sebastián Coates	(Italy) Macron	(Portugal) NOS
Tondela	(Spain) Natxo González	(Portugal) Cláudio Ramos	(Portugal) CDT	(Portugal) Cabriz
Vitória de Guimarães	(Portugal) Ivo Vieira	(Brazil) Pedro Henrique	(Italy) Macron	-
Vitória de Setúbal	(Angola) Lito Vidigal	(Portugal) Vasco Fernandes	(Denmark) Hummel	(Portugal) SGS Car

=== Managerial changes ===
Team	Outgoing manager	Manner	Date of vacancy	Pos in table	Incoming manager	Date of appointment	Ref.
Paços de Ferreira	(Portugal) Filó	Sacked	2 September 2019	18th	(Portugal) Pepa	2 September 2019	
Sporting CP	(Netherlands) Marcel Keizer	Mutual consent	3 September 2019	7th	(Portugal) Leonel Pontes (caretaker)	3 September 2019	
Belenenses SAD	(Portugal) Silas	Sacked	5 September 2019	17th	(Portugal) Pedro Ribeiro	13 September 2019	
Sporting CP	(Portugal) Leonel Pontes (caretaker)	End of caretaker role	25 September 2019	9th	(Portugal) Silas	26 September 2019	
Aves	(Portugal) Augusto Inácio	Sacked	21 October 2019	18th	(Portugal) Leandro Pires (Caretaker)	21 October 2019	
Vitória de Setúbal	(Cape Verde) Sandro Mendes	Sacked	27 October 2019	14th	(Cameroon) Albert Meyong (caretaker)	30 October 2019	
Vitória de Setúbal	(Cameroon) Albert Meyong (caretaker)	End of caretaker role	11 November 2019	12th	(Spain) Julio Velázquez	11 November 2019	
Marítimo	(Portugal) Nuno Manta Santos	Mutual consent	11 November 2019	14th	(Portugal) José Gomes	14 November 2019	
Aves	(Portugal) Leandro Pires (Caretaker)	End of caretaker role	13 November 2019	18th	(Portugal) Nuno Manta Santos	13 November 2019	
Moreirense	(Portugal) Vítor Campelos	Mutual consent	16 December 2019	11th	(Portugal) Ricardo Soares	18 December 2019	
Boavista	(Angola) Lito Vidigal	Sacked	17 December 2019	8th	(Portugal) Daniel Ramos	18 December 2019	
Braga	(Portugal) Ricardo Sá Pinto	Sacked	23 December 2019	10th	(Portugal) Ruben Amorim	27 December 2019	
Belenenses SAD	(Portugal) Pedro Ribeiro	Resigned	12 January 2020	17th	(Portugal) Petit	15 January 2020	
Portimonense	(Portugal) António Folha	Resigned	18 January 2020	17th	(Portugal) Bruno Lopes (Portugal) Joaquim Rolão Preto	19 January 2020; 6 February 2020	
Portimonense	(Portugal) Bruno Lopes (Portugal) Joaquim Rolão Preto	End of caretaker role	10 February 2020	17th	(Portugal) Paulo Sérgio	10 February 2020	
Sporting CP	(Portugal) Silas	Mutual consent	3 March 2020	4th	(Portugal) Ruben Amorim	5 March 2020	
Braga	(Portugal) Ruben Amorim	Signed by Sporting CP	5 March 2020	3rd	(Portugal) Custódio	5 March 2020	
Benfica	(Portugal) Bruno Lage	Resigned	29 June 2020	2nd	(Portugal) Nélson Veríssimo	30 June 2020	
Braga	(Portugal) Custódio	Resigned	1 July 2020	4th	(Portugal) Artur Jorge	1 July 2020	
Vitória de Setúbal	(Spain) Julio Velázquez	Mutual consent	2 July 2020	15th	(Cameroon) Albert Meyong (caretaker)	2 July 2020	
Vitória de Setúbal	(Cameroon) Albert Meyong (caretaker)	End of caretaker role	5 July 2020	15th	(Portugal) Alexandre Santana	5 July 2020	

== League table ==
Pos	Team	Pld	W	D	L	GF	GA	GD	Pts	Qualification or relegation
1	Porto (C)	34	26	4	4	74	22	+52	82	Qualification for the Champions League group stage
2	Benfica	34	24	5	5	71	26	+45	77	Qualification for the Champions League third qualifying round
3	Braga	34	18	6	10	61	40	+21	60 (Note: Head-to-head away goals: Braga 1, Sporting 0)	Qualification for the Europa League group stage (Note: Since the winners of the 2019–20 Taça de Portugal, Porto, qualified for the Champions League based on league position, the spot awarded to the third-placed team (Europa League third qualifying round) was passed to the fourth-placed team, and the spot awarded to the fourth-placed team (Europa League second qualifying round) was passed to the fifth-placed team.)
4	Sporting CP	34	18	6	10	49	34	+15	60	Qualification for the Europa League third qualifying round
5	Rio Ave	34	15	10	9	48	36	+12	55	Qualification for the Europa League second qualifying round
6	Famalicão	34	14	12	8	53	51	+2	54	
7	Vitória de Guimarães	34	13	11	10	53	38	+15	50	
8	Moreirense	34	10	13	11	42	44	−2	43 (Note: Head-to-head points: Moreirense 9, Santa Clara 7, Gil Vicente 1)	
9	Santa Clara	34	11	10	13	36	41	−5	43	
10	Gil Vicente	34	11	10	13	39	43	−4	43	
11	Marítimo	34	9	12	13	34	42	−8	39 (Note: Head-to-head points: Marítimo 12, Boavista 4, Paços de Ferreira 1)	
12	Boavista	34	10	9	15	28	39	−11	39	
13	Paços de Ferreira	34	11	6	17	35	51	−16	39	
14	Tondela	34	9	9	16	30	44	−14	36	
15	Belenenses SAD	34	9	8	17	27	54	−27	35	
16	Vitória de Setúbal (R)	34	7	13	14	27	43	−16	34	Relegation to Campeonato de Portugal (Note: Vitória de Setúbal and Aves failed to produce valid licensing documentation to compete in the 2020–21 seasons of the Primeira Liga and LigaPro, respectively, so they were punished by the Portuguese Professional Football League with direct relegation to the Campeonato de Portugal. As a result, Portimonense (17th place) were invited to remain in the top tier for the 2020–21 season.)
17	Portimonense	34	7	12	15	30	45	−15	33	
18	Aves (R)	34	5	2	27	24	68	−44	17	Left the league system in May 2023

Source: Liga Portugal
Rules for classification: 1) Points; 2) Head-to-head points; 3) Head-to-head goal difference; 4) Head-to-head away goals scored; 5) Goal difference; 6) Matches won; 7) Goals scored; 8) Play-off.
(C) Champions; (R) Relegated

=== Positions by round ===
The table lists the positions of teams after each week of matches. In order to preserve chronological evolvements, any postponed matches are not included to the round at which they were originally scheduled, but added to the full round they were played immediately afterwards.

Team ╲ Round	1	2	3	4	5	6	7	8	9	10	11	12	13	14	15	16	17	18	19	20	21	22	23	24	25	26	27	28	29	30	31	32	33	34
Porto	14	6	3	3	3	3	3	1	2	2	2	2	2	2	2	2	2	2	2	2	2	2	1	1	1	1	1	1	1	1	1	1	1	1
Benfica	1	1	3	2	2	2	2	2	1	1	1	1	1	1	1	1	1	1	1	1	1	1	2	2	2	2	2	2	2	2	2	2	2	2
Braga	2	7	7	13	16	16	11	8	10	10	9	6	7	8	6	5	5	5	3	4	3	3	3	3	3	3	4	4	4	4	4	4	4	3
Sporting CP	6	3	1	6	5	7	5	4	4	4	4	4	4	3	4	4	4	4	4	3	4	4	4	4	4	4	3	3	3	3	3	3	3	4
Rio Ave	6	13	6	5	8	4	8	7	7	9	7	9	6	6	7	7	7	7	6	5	5	5	5	5	6	6	6	6	5	6	5	6	6	5
Famalicão	3	2	2	1	1	1	1	3	3	3	3	3	3	4	3	3	3	3	5	6	6	6	6	7	5	5	5	5	6	5	6	5	5	6
Vitoria de Guimarães	6	12	13	14	10	6	4	5	5	5	5	7	5	5	5	6	6	6	7	7	8	7	7	6	7	7	7	7	7	7	7	7	7	7
Moreirense	16	7	8	7	9	10	12	12	12	13	13	11	13	11	13	13	13	13	13	13	14	10	12	8	8	9	10	9	8	8	8	8	8	8
Santa Clara	17	10	11	9	7	9	7	9	9	8	11	13	14	15	14	14	14	14	11	9	7	8	8	10	9	8	9	8	10	10	11	10	9	9
Gil Vicente	4	11	12	10	13	12	14	15	15	14	10	8	10	12	11	8	8	12	12	12	10	11	9	9	10	11	11	11	11	11	9	9	10	10
Marítimo	6	15	17	11	15	15	10	11	11	15	14	16	15	13	12	11	11	11	14	14	12	15	15	15	15	15	15	16	13	12	12	11	12	11
Boavista	4	3	5	4	4	5	6	6	6	6	6	5	9	9	8	9	12	12	8	8	9	9	10	11	11	10	8	10	9	9	10	12	11	12
Paços de Ferreira	18	18	18	18	18	17	17	17	17	17	17	17	17	17	16	15	15	15	16	16	16	16	16	16	16	16	16	12	14	13	13	13	13	13
Tondela	10	13	9	8	6	8	9	10	8	7	8	10	8	10	9	10	10	10	10	11	13	14	14	14	14	14	14	15	16	16	16	17	15	14
Belenenses SAD	8	16	15	17	12	14	16	13	13	12	15	12	12	14	15	16	16	16	15	15	15	13	13	13	13	13	13	14	12	14	14	14	14	15
Vitoria de Setúbal	10	17	16	16	11	11	13	14	13	11	12	14	11	7	10	12	9	9	9	10	11	12	11	12	12	12	12	13	15	15	15	15	16	16
Portimonense	10	5	10	12	14	13	15	16	16	16	16	15	16	16	17	17	17	17	17	17	17	17	17	17	17	17	17	17	17	17	17	16	17	17
Desportivo das Aves	14	7	14	15	17	18	18	18	18	18	18	18	18	18	18	18	18	18	18	18	18	18	18	18	18	18	18	18	18	18	18	18	18	18

Leader and UEFA Champions League group stage
UEFA Champions League third qualifying round
UEFA Europa League group stage
UEFA Europa League third qualifying round
UEFA Europa League second qualifying round
Relegation to LigaPro

Updated to match(es) played on 10 June 2020. Source: Liga Portugal (in Portuguese)

=== Results ===
Home \ Away	BEL	BEN	BOA	BRA	DAV	FAM	GVI	MAR	MOR	PAÇ	PRT	POR	RAV	STC	SCP	TON	VGU	VSE
Belenenses SAD	—	0–2	0–1	1–7	3–2	0–0	1–0	1–0	0–1	1–0	2–1	1–1	0–2	0–2	1–3	1–1	1–1	0–1
Benfica	3–2	—	3–1	0–1	2–1	4–0	2–0	4–0	1–1	5–0	4–0	0–2	2–0	3–4	2–1	0–0	2–0	1–0
Boavista	1–2	1–4	—	2–0	2–1	0–1	0–1	0–1	0–1	1–1	1–1	0–1	0–2	1–0	1–1	0–0	2–0	3–1
Braga	1–1	0–4	0–1	—	4–0	2–2	2–2	2–2	3–1	0–1	3–1	2–1	2–0	2–0	1–0	2–1	3–2	3–1
Desportivo das Aves	0–2	0–4	0–1	1–0	—	2–3	1–2	3–1	0–1	1–3	3–0	0–0	0–4	0–1	0–1	0–1	0–2	1–0
Famalicão	3–1	1–1	2–2	0–0	1–1	—	2–1	1–1	3–3	4–2	0–1	2–1	1–0	0–1	3–1	2–3	0–7	3–0
Gil Vicente	2–0	0–1	0–0	1–1	3–0	1–3	—	2–0	1–5	3–3	1–1	2–1	1–0	1–1	3–1	3–2	2–2	0–0
Marítimo	1–3	2–0	1–0	1–2	1–2	3–3	2–1	—	2–1	3–0	1–1	1–1	0–0	2–2	1–1	2–3	0–0	1–1
Moreirense	2–1	1–2	1–1	1–2	3–2	1–1	3–0	2–0	—	1–1	1–0	2–4	0–1	2–1	0–0	1–2	1–1	1–1
Paços de Ferreira	2–1	0–2	0–1	1–5	2–1	2–1	0–0	0–1	1–0	—	2–1	0–1	0–0	0–1	1–2	1–0	1–2	2–3
Portimonense	0–0	2–2	2–1	0–1	2–0	2–1	1–0	3–2	1–1	0–0	—	2–3	1–1	1–1	1–3	0–1	0–1	0–0
Porto	5–0	3–2	4–0	1–2	1–0	3–0	2–1	1–0	6–1	2–0	1–0	—	1–1	2–0	2–0	3–0	3–0	4–0
Rio Ave	0–0	1–2	2–0	4–3	5–1	2–2	1–0	0–1	1–1	2–3	2–1	0–1	—	2–2	1–1	2–4	1–1	1–0
Santa Clara	0–0	1–2	1–2	3–2	3–0	0–2	1–0	0–1	2–0	2–1	1–1	0–2	0–1	—	0–4	1–0	2–2	1–1
Sporting CP	2–0	0–2	2–0	2–1	2–0	1–2	2–1	1–0	1–0	1–0	2–1	1–2	2–3	1–0	—	2–0	3–1	0–0
Tondela	0–1	0–1	1–1	1–0	2–0	0–1	1–1	0–0	1–1	1–3	1–2	1–3	1–2	0–0	1–0	—	1–3	0–3
Vitória de Guimarães	5–0	0–1	1–1	0–2	5–1	1–1	1–2	1–0	1–1	1–0	2–0	1–2	1–2	1–0	2–2	2–0	—	2–0
Vitória de Setúbal	2–0	1–1	1–0	1–0	1–0	1–2	1–2	0–0	0–0	2–3	0–0	0–4	1–2	2–2	1–3	0–0	1–1	—

Source: Liga Portugal
Legend: Blue = home team win; Yellow = draw; Red = away team win.
For upcoming matches, an "a" indicates there is an article about the rivalry between the two participants.

== Statistics ==
=== Top goalscorers ===
Rank	Player	Club	Goals
1	(Iran) Mehdi Taremi	Rio Ave	18
1	(Brazil) Carlos Vinícius	Benfica	18
1	(Portugal) Pizzi	Benfica	18
4	(Portugal) Paulinho	Braga	17
5	(Angola) Fábio Abreu	Moreirense	13
6	(Mali) Moussa Marega	Porto	12
6	(Portugal) Fábio Martins	Famalicão	12
6	(Portugal) Ricardo Horta	Braga	12
9	(Brazil) Alex Telles	Porto	11
9	(Brazil) Douglas Tanque	Paços de Ferreira	11

=== Hat-tricks ===
Player	For	Against	Result	Date
(Cape Verde) Zé Luís	Porto	Vitória de Setúbal	4–0 (H)	17 August 2019
(Iran) Mehdi Taremi	Rio Ave	Aves	5–1 (H)	24 August 2019
(Portugal) Paulinho	Braga	Paços de Ferreira	5–1 (A)	10 July 2020

Notes

(H) – Home team
(A) – Away team

=== Top assists ===
Rank	Player	Club	Assists
1	(Portugal) Pizzi	Benfica	14
2	(Mexico) Jesús Corona	Porto	11
3	(Brazil) Otávio	Porto	9
4	(Brazil) Alex Telles	Porto	8
4	(Brazil) Bruno Tabata	Portimonense	8
6	(Portugal) Bruno Fernandes	Sporting CP	7
6	(Portugal) Paulinho	Braga	7
8	(Spain) Álex Grimaldo	Benfica	6
8	(Brazil) Lincoln	Santa Clara	6
8	(Portugal) Carlos Mané	Rio Ave	6
8	(Brazil) Carlos Vinícius	Benfica	6
8	(Portugal) Fábio Martins	Famalicão	6
8	(Portugal) Ricardo Esgaio	Braga	6

=== Clean sheets ===
Rank	Player	Club	Clean sheets
1	(Argentina) Agustín Marchesín	Porto	18
2	(Greece) Odysseas Vlachodimos	Benfica	16
3	(Georgia (country)) Giorgi Makaridze	Vitória de Setúbal	13
4	(Poland) Paweł Kieszek	Rio Ave	11
5	(Iran) Amir Abedzadeh	Marítimo	10
5	(Brazil) Douglas	Vitória de Guimarães	10
5	(Portugal) Luís Maximiano	Sporting CP	10
8	(Portugal) Marco Pereira	Santa Clara	9
8	(Portugal) Cláudio Ramos	Tondela	9
10	(Brazil) Denis	Gil Vicente	8
10	(Brazil) Mateus Pasinato	Moreirense	8

=== Discipline ===
==== Player ====
- Most yellow cards: 14
  - (Portugal) José Semedo (Vitória de Setúbal)
- Most red cards: 2
  - (Brazil) João Afonso (Gil Vicente)
  - (Uruguay) Sebastián Coates (Sporting CP)
  - (Portugal) José Semedo (Vitória de Setúbal)
  - (Brazil) Raul Silva (Braga)
  - (Brazil) Alex Telles (Porto)
  - (Algeria) Rafik Halliche (Moreirense)

==== Club ====
- Most yellow cards: 102
  - Paços de Ferreira
- Most red cards: 6
  - Famalicão

== Awards ==
=== Monthly awards ===
Month	Manager of the Month		Player of the Month		Goalkeeper of the Month		Defender of the Month		Midfielder of the Month		Forward of the Month		Goal of the Month		
Month	Name	Club	Name	Club	Name	Club	Name	Club	Name	Club	Name	Club	Name	Club	Against/Date
August	(Portugal) João Pedro Sousa	Famalicão	(Portugal) Pizzi	Benfica	(Argentina) Agustín Marchesín	Porto	(Brazil) Alex Telles	Porto	(Portugal) Bruno Fernandes	Sporting	(Cape Verde) Zé Luís	Porto	(Brazil) Davidson	Vitória Guimarães	Boavista; 18 August
September	(Portugal) João Pedro Sousa	Famalicão	(Portugal) Fábio Martins	Famalicão	(Argentina) Agustín Marchesín	Porto	(Argentina) Nehuén Pérez	Famalicão	(Portugal) Bruno Fernandes	Sporting	(Portugal) Fábio Martins	Famalicão	(Portugal) Rúben Lameiras	Famalicão	Sporting; 19 September
October/November	(Portugal) Vítor Oliveira	Gil Vicente	(Brazil) Carlos Vinícius	Benfica	(Argentina) Agustín Marchesín	Porto	(Portugal) Rúben Dias	Benfica	(Portugal) Pizzi	Benfica	(Brazil) Carlos Vinícius	Benfica	(Brazil) Alex Telles	Porto	Boavista; 10 November
December	(Portugal) Bruno Lage	Benfica	(Portugal) Pizzi	Benfica	(Argentina) Agustín Marchesín	Porto	(Brazil) Alex Telles	Porto	(Portugal) Pizzi	Benfica	(Brazil) Carlos Vinícius	Benfica	(Cape Verde) Zé Luís	Porto	Paços de Ferreira; 2 December
January	(Portugal) Bruno Lage	Benfica	(Portugal) Ricardo Horta	Braga	(Brazil) Helton Leite	Boavista	(Burkina Faso) Edmond Tapsoba	Vitória Guimarães	(Portugal) Bruno Fernandes	Sporting CP	(Portugal) Ricardo Horta	Braga	(Mexico) Jesus Corona	Porto	Moreirense; 10 January
February	(Portugal) Sérgio Conceição	Porto	(Brazil) Alex Telles	Porto	(Brazil) Helton Leite	Boavista	(Brazil) Alex Telles	Porto	(Portugal) Sérgio Oliveira	Porto	(Brazil) Sandro Lima	Gil Vicente	(Portugal) Pedro Nuno	Moreirense	Gil Vicente; 2 February
June	(Portugal) Paulo Sérgio	Portimonense	(Cape Verde) Jovane Cabral	Sporting	(Brazil) Helton Leite	Boavista	(Brazil) René Santos	Marítimo	(Portugal) Pedro Gonçalves	Famalicão	(Brazil) Douglas Tanque	Paços de Ferreira	(Brazil) Bruno Santos	Paços de Ferreira	Rio Ave; 7 June
July	–		–		–		–		–		–		(Brazil) Soares	Porto	Moreirense; 20 July

=== Annual awards ===
Annual awards were announced on 29 August 2020.

Award	Winner	Club
Player of the Season	(Mexico) Jesús Corona	Porto
Manager of the Season	(Portugal) Sérgio Conceição	Porto
Goal of the Season	(Cape Verde) Zé Luís	Porto
Young Player of the Season	(Portugal) Pedro Gonçalves	Famalicão
Top scorer	(Brazil) Carlos Vinícius	Benfica
Top scorer	(Iran) Mehdi Taremi	Rio Ave
Top scorer	(Portugal) Pizzi	Benfica
Player Fair-Play Prize	(Poland) Paweł Kieszek	Rio Ave
Club Fair-Play Prize	Gil Vicente	
Turf of the Season	Portimonense	

Team of the Year
Goalkeeper	(Argentina) Agustín Marchesín (Porto)			
Defence	(Portugal) Ricardo Esgaio (Braga)	(Portugal) Pepe (Porto)	(Portugal) Rúben Dias (Benfica)	(Brazil) Alex Telles (Porto)
Midfield	(Portugal) Pizzi (Benfica)		(Portugal) Pedro Gonçalves (Famalicão)	(Brazil) Otávio (Porto)
Attack	(Mexico) Jesús Corona (Porto)		(Portugal) Paulinho (Braga)	(Iran) Mehdi Taremi (Rio Ave)

== Number of teams by district ==
Rank	District Football Associations	Number	Teams
1	Braga	5	Braga, Famalicão, Gil Vicente, Moreirense and Vitória de Guimarães
1	Porto	5	Boavista, Desportivo das Aves, Paços de Ferreira, Porto and Rio Ave
3	Lisbon	3	Belenenses SAD, Benfica and Sporting CP
4	Faro	1	Portimonense
4	Funchal	1	Marítimo
4	Ponta Delgada	1	Santa Clara
4	Setúbal	1	Vitória de Setúbal
4	Viseu	1	Tondela
