= 2016–17 Primeira Liga =

83rd season of top-tier Portuguese football

Primeira Liga
- Season: 2016–17
- Dates: 12 August 2016 – 21 May 2017
- Champions: Benfica; 36th title
- Relegated: Arouca; Nacional
- Champions League: Benfica; Porto; Sporting CP
- Europa League: Vitória de Guimarães; Braga; Marítimo
- Matches: 306
- Goals: 728 (2.38 per match)
- Top goalscorer: Bas Dost (34 goals)
- Biggest home win: Porto 7–0 Nacional (4 March 2017)
- Biggest away win: Nacional 0–4 Porto (1 October 2016); Feirense 0–4 Porto (11 December 2016)
- Highest scoring: Vitória de Guimarães 5–3 Paços de Ferreira (26 August 2016); Braga 6–2 Feirense (28 November 2016)
- Longest winning run: 9 matches Porto
- Longest unbeaten run: 30 matches Porto
- Longest winless run: 9 matches Feirense
- Longest losing run: 6 matches Estoril
- Highest attendance: 64,591; Benfica 5–0 Vitória de Guimarães (13 May 2017)
- Lowest attendance: 640; Moreirense 1–0 Belenenses (9 January 2017)
- Total attendance: 3,622,372
- Average attendance: 11,838

The 2016–17 Primeira Liga (also known as Liga NOS for sponsorship reasons) was the 83rd season of the Primeira Liga, the top Portuguese professional league for association football clubs.

Benfica successfully defended their title, winning the league for a fourth consecutive season and record 36th time.

== Teams ==
For the third consecutive season, the league was contested by a total of 18 teams, which included the best 16 sides from the 2015–16 season and two promoted from the 2015–16 LigaPro.

Porto B won the 2015–16 LigaPro title on 8 May 2016, but as the reserve team of Primeira Liga side Porto they were ineligible for promotion, which meant that the third-placed team would be promoted instead. On the same day, Chaves drew 1–1 with Portimonense to secure the return to the top flight of Portuguese football, 17 years after their last appearance in the 1998–99 season. On the final matchday, Feirense secured the third place and last promotion slot after drawing 1–1 with Chaves; they return to the Primeira Liga four years after their last appearance in the 2011–12 season.

The two promoted clubs replaced Académica and União da Madeira. Académica confirmed their relegation on 7 May 2016 after a run of 14 consecutive seasons in the Primeira Liga, following a goalless draw against Braga. On the last matchday, União da Madeira's 2–1 defeat against Rio Ave also sealed their relegation, one season after having been promoted.

=== Stadia and locations ===
Location of teams in 2016–17 Primeira Liga (Mainland)
Location of teams in 2016–17 Primeira Liga (Madeira)

Team	Location	Stadium	Capacity	2015–16 finish
Arouca	Arouca	Estádio Municipal de Arouca	5,000	5th
Belenenses	Lisbon	Estádio do Restelo	19,856	9th
Benfica	Lisbon	Estádio da Luz	64,642	1st
Boavista	Porto	Estádio do Bessa	30,000	14th
Braga	Braga	Estádio Municipal de Braga	30,286	4th
Chaves	Chaves	Estádio Municipal Eng. Manuel Branco Teixeira	8,000	2nd (LP)
Estoril	Estoril	Estádio António Coimbra da Mota	8,000	8th
Feirense	Santa Maria da Feira	Estádio Marcolino de Castro	5,401	3rd (LP)
Marítimo	Funchal	Estádio do Marítimo	10,600	13th
Moreirense	Moreira de Cónegos	Parque de Jogos Comendador Joaquim de Almeida Freitas	6,153	12th
Nacional	Funchal	Estádio da Madeira	5,586	11th
Paços de Ferreira	Paços de Ferreira	Estádio Capital do Móvel	6,404	7th
Porto	Porto	Estádio do Dragão	50,035	3rd
Rio Ave	Vila do Conde	Estádio dos Arcos	9,065	6th
Sporting CP	Lisbon	Estádio José Alvalade	50,044	2nd
Tondela	Tondela	Estádio João Cardoso	5,000	16th
Vitória de Guimarães	Guimarães	Estádio D. Afonso Henriques	30,008	10th
Vitória de Setúbal	Setúbal	Estádio do Bonfim	13,468	15th

=== Personnel and sponsors ===
Team	Manager	Captain	Kit Manufacturer	Sponsors
Arouca	(Portugal) Jorge Leitão	(Portugal) Nuno Coelho	Joma	Banco BIC
Belenenses	(Portugal) Domingos Paciência	(Portugal) Gonçalo Brandão	Lacatoni	Kia Motors
Benfica	(Portugal) Rui Vitória	(Brazil) Luisão	Adidas	Emirates
Boavista	(Portugal) Miguel Leal	(Senegal) Idris	Lacatoni	Mestre da Cor
Braga	(Portugal) Jorge Simão	(Brazil) Alan	Lacatoni	Visit Braga
Chaves	(Portugal) Ricardo Soares	(Portugal) Nélson Lenho	Lacatoni	Chaves - Capital Termal
Estoril	(Portugal) Pedro Emanuel	(Portugal) Diogo Amado	Nike	Banco BIC
Feirense	(Portugal) Nuno Manta	(Portugal) Cris	Legea	Mestre da Cor
Marítimo	(Portugal) Daniel Ramos	(Brazil) Fransérgio	Nike	Santander Totta
Moreirense	(Portugal) Petit	(Portugal) André Micael	CDT	—
Nacional	(Portugal) João de Deus	(Portugal) Rui Correia	Hummel	Santander Totta
Paços de Ferreira	(Portugal) Vasco Seabra	(Cape Verde) Ricardo	Lacatoni	Fixpaços
Porto	(Portugal) Nuno Espírito Santo	(Mexico) Héctor Herrera	New Balance	MEO
Rio Ave	(Portugal) Luís Castro	(Portugal) Tarantini	Adidas	MEO
Sporting CP	(Portugal) Jorge Jesus	(Portugal) Adrien Silva	Macron	NOS
Tondela	(Portugal) Pepa	(Brazil) Kaká	CDT	Laboratórios BASI
Vitória de Guimarães	(Portugal) Pedro Martins	(Portugal) Josué Sá	Macron	Shirt sponsor varies from match to match
Vitória de Setúbal	(Portugal) José Couceiro	(Portugal) Frederico Venâncio	Hummel	Kia Motors

=== Managerial changes ===
Team	Outgoing manager	Manner of departure	Date of vacancy	Position in table	Incoming manager	Date of appointment
Chaves	(Portugal) Vítor Oliveira	Mutual consent	10 May 2016	Pre-season	(Portugal) Jorge Simão	21 May 2016
Rio Ave	(Portugal) Pedro Martins	Mutual consent	17 May 2016	Pre-season	(Portugal) Capucho	20 May 2016
Vitória de Setúbal	(Portugal) Quim Machado	Mutual consent	18 May 2016	Pre-season	(Portugal) José Couceiro	25 May 2016
Vitória de Guimarães	(Portugal) Sérgio Conceição	Mutual consent	18 May 2016	Pre-season	(Portugal) Pedro Martins	25 May 2016
Moreirense	(Portugal) Miguel Leal	Contract expired	19 May 2016	Pre-season	(Portugal) Pepa	20 May 2016
Paços de Ferreira	(Portugal) Jorge Simão	Mutual consent	21 May 2016	Pre-season	(Portugal) Carlos Pinto	25 May 2016
Marítimo	(Portugal) Nelo Vingada	Contract expired	23 May 2016	Pre-season	(Brazil) Paulo César Gusmão	1 June 2016
Porto	(Portugal) José Peseiro	Sacked	30 May 2016	Pre-season	(Portugal) Nuno Espírito Santo	1 June 2016
Braga	(Portugal) Paulo Fonseca	Signed by Shakhtar Donetsk	31 May 2016	Pre-season	(Portugal) José Peseiro	6 June 2016
Marítimo	(Brazil) Paulo César Gusmão	Mutual consent	19 September 2016	17th	(Portugal) Daniel Ramos	22 September 2016
Belenenses	(Spain) Julio Velázquez	Mutual consent	5 October 2016	8th	(Portugal) Quim Machado	6 October 2016
Boavista	(Bolivia) Erwin Sánchez	Sacked	10 October 2016	13th	(Portugal) Miguel Leal	11 October 2016
Rio Ave	(Portugal) Capucho	Sacked	10 November 2016	13th	(Portugal) Luís Castro	14 November 2016
Moreirense	(Portugal) Pepa	Sacked	21 November 2016	16th	(Portugal) Leandro Mendes (caretaker)	22 November 2016
Moreirense	(Portugal) Leandro Mendes (caretaker)	Ended caretaking role	28 November 2016	18th	(Portugal) Augusto Inácio	28 November 2016
Paços de Ferreira	(Portugal) Carlos Pinto	Sacked	28 November 2016	15th	(Portugal) Vasco Seabra	28 November 2016 (as caretaker); 13 December 2016 (confirmed)
Estoril	(Brazil) Fabiano	Sacked	11 December 2016	11th	(Portugal) Filipe Pedro (caretaker)	11 December 2016
Braga	(Portugal) José Peseiro	Sacked	15 December 2016	4th	(Portugal) Abel Ferreira (caretaker)	15 December 2016
Estoril	(Portugal) Filipe Pedro (caretaker)	Ended caretaking role	15 December 2016	11th	(Spain) Pedro Gómez Carmona	15 December 2016
Chaves	(Portugal) Jorge Simão	Signed by Braga	19 December 2016	7th	(Portugal) Carlos Pires (caretaker)	19 December 2016
Braga	(Portugal) Abel Ferreira (caretaker)	Ended caretaking role	19 December 2016	3rd	(Portugal) Jorge Simão	19 December 2016
Feirense	(Portugal) José Mota	Sacked	20 December 2016	17th	(Portugal) Nuno Manta (caretaker)	20 December 2016 (as caretaker); 30 December 2016 (confirmed)
Chaves	(Portugal) Carlos Pires (caretaker)	Ended caretaking role	20 December 2016	8th	(Portugal) Ricardo Soares	20 December 2016
Nacional	(Portugal) Manuel Machado	Mutual consent	28 December 2016	16th	(Serbia) Predrag Jokanović	30 December 2016
Tondela	(Portugal) Petit	Resigned	9 January 2017	18th	(Portugal) Pepa	10 January 2017
Estoril	(Spain) Pedro Gómez Carmona	Resigned	8 March 2017	15th	(Portugal) Pedro Emanuel	8 March 2017
Moreirense	(Portugal) Augusto Inácio	Mutual consent	20 March 2017	16th	(Portugal) Petit	20 March 2017
Nacional	(Serbia) Predrag Jokanović	Mutual consent	21 March 2017	18th	(Portugal) João de Deus	21 March 2017
Arouca	(Portugal) Manuel Machado	Mutual consent	21 March 2017	14th	(Portugal) Jorge Leitão	21 March 2017
Belenenses	(Portugal) Quim Machado	Sacked	18 April 2017	12th	(Portugal) Domingos Paciência	18 April 2017
Braga	(Portugal) Jorge Simão	Mutual consent	23 April 2017	5th	(Portugal) Abel Ferreira	26 April 2017

== Season summary ==
=== League table ===
Pos	Team	Pld	W	D	L	GF	GA	GD	Pts	Qualification or relegation
1	Benfica (C)	34	25	7	2	72	18	+54	82	Qualification for the Champions League group stage
2	Porto	34	22	10	2	71	19	+52	76	Qualification for the Champions League group stage
3	Sporting CP	34	21	7	6	68	36	+32	70	Qualification for the Champions League play-off round
4	Vitória de Guimarães	34	18	8	8	50	39	+11	62	Qualification for the Europa League group stage (Note: Since Benfica won the 2016–17 Taça de Portugal, the spot awarded to the cup winner (Europa League group stage) was passed to the fourth-placed team and the spot originally meant for the fourth-placed team (Europa League third qualifying round) was given to the sixth-placed team.)
5	Braga	34	15	9	10	51	36	+15	54	Qualification for the Europa League third qualifying round
6	Marítimo	34	13	11	10	34	32	+2	50	Qualification for the Europa League third qualifying round
7	Rio Ave	34	14	7	13	41	39	+2	49	
8	Feirense	34	14	6	14	31	45	−14	48	
9	Boavista	34	10	13	11	33	36	−3	43	
10	Estoril	34	10	8	16	36	42	−6	38 (Note: Estoril is ahead of Chaves and Vitória de Setúbal on head-to-head points: Estoril 6 pts, Chaves 5 pts, Vitória de Setúbal 5 pts. Chaves is ahead of Vitória de Setúbal on head-to-head goal difference.)	
11	Chaves	34	8	14	12	35	42	−7	38	
12	Vitória de Setúbal	34	10	8	16	30	39	−9	38	
13	Paços de Ferreira	34	8	12	14	32	45	−13	36 (Note: Paços de Ferreira is ahead of Belenenses on head-to-head points: Paços de Ferreira 1–0 Belenenses, Belenenses 1–2 Paços de Ferreira.)	
14	Belenenses	34	9	9	16	27	45	−18	36	
15	Moreirense	34	8	9	17	33	48	−15	33	
16	Tondela	34	8	8	18	29	52	−23	32 (Note: Tondela is ahead of Arouca on overall goal difference.)	
17	Arouca (R)	34	9	5	20	33	57	−24	32	Relegation to LigaPro
18	Nacional (R)	34	4	9	21	22	58	−36	21	Relegation to LigaPro

Source: Liga Portugal
Rules for classification: 1) Points; 2) Head-to-head points; 3) Head-to-head goal difference; 4) Head-to-head away goals scored; 5) Goal difference; 6) Matches won; 7) Goals scored; 8) Play-off.
(Note: The LPFP decided that only criteria 1, 5, 6 and 7 would be applied to establish the classification during the competition.)
(C) Champions; (R) Relegated

=== Positions by round ===
Team ╲ Round	1	2	3	4	5	6	7	8	9	10	11	12	13	14	15	16	17	18	19	20	21	22	23	24	25	26	27	28	29	30	31	32	33	34
Benfica	2	4	2	3	1	1	1	1	1	1	1	1	1	1	1	1	1	1	1	1	1	1	1	1	1	1	1	1	1	1	1	1	1	1
Porto	1	1	6	4	3	3	2	2	2	2	4	3	2	2	2	2	2	2	2	2	2	2	2	2	2	2	2	2	2	2	2	2	2	2
Sporting CP	5	2	1	1	2	2	3	3	4	3	2	2	3	4	4	4	4	4	3	3	3	3	3	3	3	3	3	3	3	3	3	3	3	3
Vitória de Guimarães	12	8	5	9	10	5	6	5	5	4	5	5	5	5	5	5	5	5	5	5	5	5	4	5	5	5	5	5	4	4	4	4	4	4
Braga	7	7	4	2	4	4	4	4	3	5	3	4	4	3	3	3	3	3	4	4	4	4	5	4	4	4	4	4	5	5	5	5	5	5
Marítimo	17	18	14	14	17	13	9	8	11	9	9	7	9	7	8	8	6	7	7	6	6	6	6	6	6	6	6	6	6	6	6	6	6	6
Rio Ave	13	13	10	6	5	6	7	7	7	11	7	6	6	6	6	6	8	10	9	9	9	10	10	8	7	7	7	7	7	7	7	7	7	7
Feirense	4	10	13	10	7	9	10	9	8	13	14	16	17	17	15	16	15	13	13	13	13	13	13	13	12	11	9	10	11	9	8	8	8	8
Boavista	3	6	7	11	12	14	13	12	10	8	11	13	13	14	10	9	11	9	10	11	11	9	9	10	10	8	10	11	10	10	9	9	9	9
Estoril	16	17	17	17	14	17	14	15	16	12	8	9	11	13	14	14	14	16	16	16	16	15	15	15	15	15	15	15	15	14	15	14	12	10
Chaves	10	11	8	8	6	8	5	6	6	6	6	8	7	8	7	7	7	6	8	7	7	7	7	7	8	9	8	8	8	8	10	10	10	11
Vitória de Setúbal	6	5	3	5	8	11	12	11	9	7	10	14	10	11	9	11	10	8	6	8	8	8	8	11	11	12	11	9	9	11	12	11	13	12
Paços de Ferreira	9	12	15	15	11	10	11	10	12	14	15	12	14	12	13	13	13	14	15	14	14	14	14	14	13	13	13	13	14	12	11	12	14	13
Belenenses	15	15	11	7	9	7	8	13	13	10	12	10	8	9	11	12	12	12	12	12	12	12	11	9	9	10	12	12	12	13	13	13	11	14
Moreirense	8	3	9	12	13	16	18	17	15	16	18	15	16	16	17	15	16	15	14	15	15	16	16	16	16	16	16	16	16	16	16	16	16	15
Tondela	18	14	16	16	18	18	17	16	18	18	16	17	18	18	18	18	18	18	18	17	18	18	18	17	17	17	18	18	18	17	17	17	17	16
Arouca	14	9	12	13	16	15	16	18	17	17	13	11	12	10	12	10	9	11	11	10	10	11	12	12	14	14	14	14	13	15	14	15	15	17
Nacional	11	16	18	18	15	12	15	14	14	15	17	18	15	15	16	17	17	17	17	18	17	17	17	18	18	18	17	17	17	18	18	18	18	18

Leader
Relegation to 2017–18 LigaPro

Source: Liga Portugal

=== Results ===
Home \ Away	ARO	BEL	BEN	BOA	BRA	CHA	EST	FEI	MAR	MOR	NAC	PAÇ	POR	RAV	SCP	TON	VGU	VSE
Arouca	—	1–2	1–2	1–2	1–1	0–1	2–1	2–0	1–0	2–2	2–0	1–0	0–4	0–2	1–2	1–2	0–1	2–1
Belenenses	1–1	—	0–2	0–0	1–2	2–1	1–3	1–2	1–0	1–1	2–1	1–2	0–0	1–0	0–1	0–0	1–1	1–2
Benfica	3–0	4–0	—	3–3	3–1	3–1	2–1	4–0	3–0	3–0	3–0	3–0	1–1	2–0	2–1	4–0	5–0	1–1
Boavista	2–0	0–1	2–2	—	1–1	2–2	0–0	1–2	3–0	2–0	2–2	0–0	0–1	0–1	0–1	1–0	1–2	1–0
Braga	3–1	2–1	0–1	3–0	—	1–0	1–1	6–2	3–3	2–1	4–0	3–0	1–1	1–1	2–3	2–0	1–2	2–1
Chaves	2–0	3–1	0–2	0–0	0–0	—	1–0	1–1	0–0	2–1	2–0	1–0	0–2	2–2	2–2	1–1	2–3	0–0
Estoril	4–2	1–1	0–1	0–0	1–3	2–1	—	0–2	0–1	2–0	0–1	2–1	1–2	0–2	0–2	2–0	0–2	3–0
Feirense	0–2	0–1	0–1	0–1	0–1	3–2	1–0	—	2–1	0–3	0–3	2–0	0–4	2–1	2–1	2–1	0–0	1–1
Marítimo	3–1	3–0	2–1	1–1	1–0	2–1	1–1	2–0	—	1–0	0–0	3–1	1–1	0–1	2–2	2–0	0–2	1–0
Moreirense	1–4	1–0	0–1	0–0	2–1	0–0	1–1	1–1	0–1	—	3–1	1–1	3–1	1–1	2–3	1–1	0–1	1–2
Nacional	1–1	1–1	1–3	0–2	0–0	0–1	0–1	0–0	2–0	0–1	—	1–1	0–4	0–2	0–0	3–2	1–2	1–2
Paços de Ferreira	1–1	1–0	0–0	2–1	3–1	1–1	0–0	0–1	0–0	0–2	1–1	—	0–0	2–1	0–1	0–0	2–0	2–1
Porto	3–0	3–0	1–1	3–1	1–0	2–1	1–0	0–0	2–1	3–0	7–0	4–1	—	4–2	2–1	4–0	3–0	1–1
Rio Ave	3–0	2–0	0–1	1–2	1–0	2–2	1–2	1–0	0–0	3–2	2–1	0–0	1–3	—	3–1	3–1	0–3	0–0
Sporting CP	3–0	1–3	1–1	4–0	0–1	4–1	4–2	2–1	2–0	3–0	2–0	4–2	2–1	1–0	—	1–1	1–1	2–0
Tondela	1–2	0–1	0–2	1–1	2–0	2–0	0–2	0–1	1–1	1–2	2–0	2–1	0–0	2–1	1–4	—	2–1	2–1
Vitória de Guimarães	1–0	1–1	0–2	2–0	0–1	1–1	3–3	0–1	0–0	1–0	2–1	5–3	0–2	3–0	3–3	2–1	—	3–1
Vitória de Setúbal	2–0	2–0	1–0	0–1	1–1	0–0	2–0	1–2	0–1	2–0	1–0	1–4	0–0	0–1	0–3	3–0	0–2	—

Updated to match(es) played on 21 May 2017. Source: Liga Portugal
Legend: Blue = home team win; Yellow = draw; Red = away team win.
For upcoming matches, an "a" indicates there is an article about the rivalry between the two participants.

== Statistics ==
=== Top goalscorers ===
Rank	Player	Club	Goals
1	(Netherlands) Bas Dost	Sporting CP	34
2	(Brazil) Soares	Porto	19
3	(Greece) Kostas Mitroglou	Benfica	16
3	(Portugal) André Silva	Porto	16
5	(Brazil) Jonas	Benfica	13
5	(Mali) Moussa Marega	Vitória de Guimarães	13
7	(Brazil) Welthon	Paços de Ferreira	11
7	(Portugal) Rui Fonte	Braga	11
9	(Portugal) Pizzi	Benfica	10
10	(Portugal) Hernâni	Vitória de Guimarães	8

==== Hat-tricks ====
Player	For	Against	Result	Date
(Algeria) Okacha Hamzaoui	Nacional	Feirense	0–3	24 September 2016
(Portugal) Diogo Jota	Porto	Nacional	0–4	1 October 2016
(Mali) Moussa Marega	Vitória de Guimarães	Rio Ave	0–3	30 October 2016
(Portugal) Jorginho	Arouca	Moreirense	1–4	17 December 2016
(Netherlands) Bas Dost^{4}	Sporting CP	Tondela	1–4	11 March 2017
(Netherlands) Bas Dost	Sporting CP	Boavista	4–0	8 April 2017
(Netherlands) Bas Dost	Sporting CP	Braga	3–2	30 April 2017
(Netherlands) Bas Dost	Sporting CP	Chaves	4–1	21 May 2017

=== Top assists ===
Rank	Player	Club	Assists
1	(Portugal) Gelson Martins	Sporting CP	8
1	(Portugal) Pizzi	Benfica	8
1	(Brazil) Alex Telles	Porto	8
1	(Portugal) Wilson Eduardo	Braga	8
5	(Portugal) Pedro Santos	Braga	7
5	(Portugal) Iuri Medeiros	Boavista	7
7	(Portugal) Nélson Semedo	Benfica	6
7	(Mali) Moussa Marega	Vitória de Guimarães	6
7	(Brazil) Otávio	Porto	6
7	(Angola) Mateus	Arouca	6
7	(Brazil) Raphinha	Vitória de Guimarães	6
7	(Argentina) Eduardo Salvio	Benfica	6
7	(Brazil) Patrick	Marítimo	6

=== Scoring ===
- First goal of the season: Marcelo, for Rio Ave vs Porto (12 August 2016)
- Latest goal of the season: Bas Dost, for Sporting CP vs Chaves (21 May 2017)
- Biggest home win:
  - Porto 7–0 Nacional (4 March 2017)
- Biggest away win:
  - Nacional 0–4 Porto (1 October 2016)
  - Feirense 0–4 Porto (11 December 2016)
- Highest scoring match: 8 goals
  - Vitória de Guimarães 5–3 Paços de Ferreira (26 August 2016)
  - Braga 6–2 Feirense (28 November 2016)
- Biggest winning margin: 7 goals
  - Porto 7–0 Nacional (4 March 2017)
- Most goals scored in a match by a team: 7 goals
  - Porto 7–0 Nacional (4 March 2017)

=== Match streaks ===
- Longest winning run: 9 matches
  - Porto, from matchday 17 (15 January 2017) to matchday 25 (10 March 2016)
- Longest unbeaten run: 30 matches
  - Porto, from matchday 4 (10 September 2016) to matchday 33 (14 May 2017)
- Longest winless run: 9 matches
  - Feirense, from matchday 6 (24 September 2016) to matchday 14 (19 December 2016)
- Longest losing run: 7 matches
  - Estoril, from matchday 13 (9 December 2016) to matchday 19 (28 January 2017)
  - Arouca from matchday 21 (10 February 2017) to matchday 27 (2 April 2017)
  - Belenenses from matchday 25 (13 March 2017) to matchday 31 (30 April 2017)
- Most consecutive draws: 4 matches
  - Chaves, from matchday 9 (31 October 2016) to matchday 12 (4 December 2016)
  - Paços de Ferreira from matchday 23 (25 February 2017) to matchday 26 (18 March 2017)

=== Discipline ===
==== Club ====
- Most yellow cards: 100
  - Feirense
- Most red cards: 9
  - Tondela

==== Player ====
- Most yellow cards: 14
  - (Portugal) Vítor Bruno (Feirense)
- Most red cards: 3
  - (Portugal) Tobias Figueiredo (Nacional)

== Awards ==
=== Monthly awards ===
==== SJPF Young Player of the Month ====
Month	Player	Club	Vote percentage
August/September	(Portugal) Gelson Martins	Sporting CP	19.23%
October/November	(Portugal) Gonçalo Guedes	Benfica	15.75%
December	(Portugal) Gelson Martins	Sporting CP	16.34%
January	(Portugal) André Silva	Porto	14.26%
February	(Portugal) Nélson Semedo	Benfica	25.11%
March	(Portugal) João Carvalho	Vitória de Setúbal	19.97%
April	(Portugal) João Carvalho	Vitória de Setúbal	20.08%

==== Goal of the month ====
Month	Scorer	For	Against	Stadium	Date	Vote percentage
August	(Portugal) Pedro Santos	Braga	Vitória de Guimarães	Estádio D. Afonso Henriques	14 August 2016	43.56%
September	(Portugal) Salvador Agra	Nacional	Marítimo	Estádio da Madeira	16 September 2016	55.56%
October	(Algeria) Yacine Brahimi	Porto	Arouca	Estádio do Dragão	22 October 2016	40.74%
November	(Portugal) Renato Santos	Boavista	Rio Ave	Estádio dos Arcos	5 November 2016	37.04%
December	(Brazil) Bruno César	Sporting CP	Vitória de Setúbal	Estádio José Alvalade	3 December 2016	31.75%
January	(Portugal) Roberto Rodrigo	Moreirense	Feirense	Parque Joaquim de Almeida Freitas	2 February 2017 (Note: Although the match between Moreirense and Feirense was played in February, since the majority of the games from the 19th round were disputed on 28 January, Roberto's goal is included in January's ballot.)	50.55%
February	(Portugal) Hernâni	Vitória de Guimarães	Belenenses	Estádio do Restelo	19 February 2017	30.56%
March	(Mozambique) Zainadine Júnior	Marítimo	Arouca	Estádio do Marítimo	19 March 2017	55.56%
April	(Sweden) Victor Lindelöf	Benfica	Sporting CP	Estádio José Alvalade	22 April 2017	27.77%
May	(Brazil) Nildo Petrolina	Moreirense	Braga	Parque Joaquim Almeida Freitas	5 May 2017	51.70%

=== Annual awards ===
==== Player of the Season ====
The Player of the Season was awarded to (Portugal) Pizzi (Benfica)

==== Manager of the Season ====
The Manager of the Season was awarded to (Portugal) Rui Vitória (Benfica)

==== Young Player of the Season ====
The Young Player of the Year was awarded to (Portugal) Nelson Semedo (Benfica)

==== Goalkeeper of the Season ====
The Goalkeeper of the Year was awarded to (Brazil) Ederson (Benfica)

=== Team of the Year ===
Team of the Year

Team of the Year
Goalkeeper	(Portugal) Rui Patrício (Sporting CP)			
Defenders	(Brazil) Alex Telles (Porto)	(Uruguay) Sebastián Coates (Sporting CP)	(Brazil) Felipe (Porto)	(Portugal) Nélson Semedo (Benfica)
Midfielders	(Portugal) Danilo Pereira (Porto)		(Portugal) William Carvalho (Sporting CP)	(Portugal) Pizzi (Benfica)
Forwards	(Portugal) Gelson Martins (Sporting CP)		(Brazil) Jonas (Benfica)	(Algeria) Yacine Brahimi (Porto)

==== Goal of the season ====
The goal of the season was disputed by all the previous winners of the monthly polls.

Rank	Scorer	Vote percentage
1st	(Portugal) Hernâni	33.55%
2nd	(Portugal) Roberto Rodrigo	13.56%
3rd	(Portugal) Salvador Agra	9.78%

== Attendances ==
Pos	Team	Total	High	Low	Average	Change
1	Benfica	951,184	64,591	46,256	55,952	+11.2%
2	Sporting CP	727,121	49,399	32,457	42,772	+7.0%
3	Porto	631,202	50,019	22,208	37,130	+14.9%
4	Vitória de Guimarães	318,856	26,985	12,953	18,756	+51.0%
5	Braga	195,366	24,836	5,545	11,492	+2.9%
6	Marítimo	132,909	10,454	4,150	7,818	+27.2%
7	Boavista	103,461	16,157	3,955	6,086	+6.0%
8	Belenenses	68,799	12,236	1,309	4,047	−9.3%
9	Rio Ave	67,215	8,767	1,508	3,954	+19.8%
10	Vitória de Setúbal	65,320	10,109	2,081	3,842	−13.4%
11	Chaves	61,551	8,000	1,730	3,496	+33.3%^{1}
12	Paços de Ferreira	58,051	9,076	1,059	3,415	+21.9%
13	Feirense	50,517	5,449	1,099	2,972	+183.6%^{1}
14	Nacional	46,500	5,017	1,126	2,735	+9.8%
15	Tondela	39,239	4,987	1,045	2,308	−30.5%^{2}
16	Estoril	38,668	7,429	877	2,275	−22.7%
17	Moreirense	37,383	5,603	640	2,199	−2.0%
18	Arouca	29,030	5,351	658	1,708	−40.8%
	League total	3,622,372	64,591	640	11,838	+9.3%

Source: Liga Portugal
Notes:
1: Played last season in LigaPro.
2: Tondela managed to get the highest season attendance of 4,987 spectators in two matches (against Sporting CP and Braga).
