= 2018–19 Primeira Liga =

85th season of top-tier Portuguese football

Primeira Liga
- Season: 2018–19
- Dates: 10 August 2018 – 19 May 2019
- Champions: Benfica; 37th title
- Relegated: Chaves; Nacional; Feirense
- Champions League: Benfica; Porto
- Europa League: Sporting CP; Braga; Vitória de Guimarães
- Matches: 306
- Goals: 826 (2.7 per match)
- Top goalscorer: Haris Seferovic (23 goals)
- Biggest home win: Benfica 10–0 Nacional (10 February 2019)
- Biggest away win: Belenenses SAD 1–8 Sporting CP (5 May 2019)
- Highest scoring: Benfica 10–0 Nacional (10 February 2019)
- Longest winning run: 9 matches Benfica; Porto; Sporting CP
- Longest unbeaten run: 19 matches Benfica
- Longest winless run: 31 matches (league record); Feirense
- Longest losing run: 8 matches Chaves
- Highest attendance: 64,064; Benfica 4–1 Santa Clara (18 May 2019)
- Lowest attendance: 298; Belenenses SAD 0–1 Moreirense (4 February 2019)
- Total attendance: 3,577,720
- Average attendance: 11,692

The 2018–19 Primeira Liga (also known as Liga NOS for sponsorship reasons) was the 85th season of the Primeira Liga, the top professional league for Portuguese association football clubs. Porto were the defending champions but finished behind Benfica, who became champions for a record 37th time while equalling their own scoring record of 103 goals in the 1963–64 season.

== Incidents ==
The weeks leading up to the beginning of the competition were filled with several incidents:

- Contrary to previous seasons, three teams will be relegated. This is due to the fact that Gil Vicente was granted a place in the 2019–20 Primeira Liga season by court decision. Gil Vicente argued against this solution since the club claimed for an immediate integration in the first tier (possibly with an enlargement to 20 participating teams).
- Académico de Viseu, which had finished third in 2017–18 LigaPro, claimed that runners-up Santa Clara should be punished for irregularities occurred in several games of the season. This would prevent Santa Clara to be promoted to the 2018–2019 Primeira Liga, hence Académico de Viseu would take its place.
- Following the incidents in Sporting CP's training centre, during which players and staff were attacked by the club's ultras, nine players unilaterally revoked their contracts. Ultimately, after the president's impeachment (as he was accused of being responsible for those occurrences), the club was able to convince some of those players to return. Nevertheless, the new administration always admitted that the club would start the season in an early preparation phase.
- On 30 June, following disputes over the administration of the football section, Belenenses broke the relationship with the publicly traded company who owned the football section (in Portuguese, SAD - as for sociedade anónima desportiva). Nevertheless, Codecity Sports Management, the owners of Belenenses's football Inc., decided to keep business and placed an entering in Primeira Liga under the name "Belenenses SAD", using Estádio Nacional as home stadium. In October, the intellectual property court issued an obligation for the team owned by Codecity Sports Management to rebrand, dismissing every trademark connection with Clube de Futebol "Os Belenenses" but the society did not follow and appealed the decision. The original club made a fresh start, entering a team in the bottom division of Lisbon FA (6th tier), keeping the support of a vast majority of the fans.

== Teams ==
=== Stadia and locations ===
Location of teams in 2018–19 Primeira Liga (Mainland)
Location of teams in 2018–19 Primeira Liga (Madeira)
Location of teams in 2018–19 Primeira Liga (Azores)

Team	Location	Stadium	Capacity	2017–18 finish
Belenenses SAD	Oeiras	Estádio Nacional	37,500	12th
Benfica	Lisbon	Estádio da Luz	65,200	2nd
Boavista	Porto	Estádio do Bessa	28,263	8th
Braga	Braga	Estádio Municipal de Braga	30,000	4th
Chaves	Chaves	Estádio Municipal Eng. Manuel Branco Teixeira	8,400	6th
Desportivo das Aves	Aves	Estádio do CD Aves	6,230	13th
Feirense	Santa Maria da Feira	Estádio Marcolino de Castro	5,600	16th
Marítimo	Funchal	Estádio do Marítimo	10,600	7th
Moreirense	Moreira de Cónegos	Parque de Jogos Comendador Joaquim de Almeida Freitas	6,150	15th
Nacional	Funchal	Estádio da Madeira	5,200	1st (LP)
Portimonense	Portimão	Estádio Municipal de Portimão	5,870	10th
Porto	Porto	Estádio do Dragão	50,033	1st
Rio Ave	Vila do Conde	Estádio dos Arcos	9,065	5th
Santa Clara	Ponta Delgada	Estádio de São Miguel	10,000	2nd (LP)
Sporting CP	Lisbon	Estádio José Alvalade	50,095	3rd
Tondela	Tondela	Estádio João Cardoso	5,000	11th
Vitória de Guimarães	Guimarães	Estádio D. Afonso Henriques	30,000	9th
Vitória de Setúbal	Setúbal	Estádio do Bonfim	15,497	14th

=== Personnel and sponsors ===
Team	Manager	Captain	Kit Manufacturer	Sponsors
Belenenses SAD	(Portugal) Silas	(Portugal) Gonçalo Silva	Lacatoni	Kia Motors
Benfica	(Portugal) Bruno Lage	(Brazil) Jardel	Adidas	Emirates
Boavista	(Portugal) Jorge Simão	(Senegal) Idris	Lacatoni	Mestre da Cor
Braga	Vacant	(Brazil) Marcelo Goiano	Lacatoni	Forum Braga
Chaves	(Portugal) Daniel Ramos	(Portugal) Nuno André Coelho	Lacatoni	Museu do Pão
Desportivo das Aves	(Portugal) José Mota	(Portugal) Nélson Lenho	Lacatoni	Meo
Feirense	(Portugal) Nuno Manta Santos	(Portugal) Cris	Legea	Castro Electrónica
Marítimo	(Portugal) Petit	(Portugal) Edgar Costa	Nike	Santander Totta
Moreirense	(Portugal) Ivo Vieira	(Portugal) Arsénio	CDT	—
Nacional	(Portugal) Costinha	(Portugal) Jota	Hummel	Santander Totta
Portimonense	(Portugal) António Folha	(Portugal) Ricardo Ferreira	Mizuno	McDonald's
Porto	(Portugal) Sérgio Conceição	(Mexico) Héctor Herrera	New Balance	Altice
Rio Ave	(Portugal) Daniel Ramos	(Portugal) Tarantini	Nike	Meo
Santa Clara	(Portugal) João Henriques	(Canada) Pedro Pacheco	Nike	Santander Totta
Sporting CP	(Netherlands) Marcel Keizer	(Portugal) Bruno Fernandes	Macron	NOS
Tondela	(Portugal) Pepa	(Portugal) Ricardo Costa	CDT	Laboratórios BASI
Vitória de Guimarães	(Portugal) Luís Castro	(Portugal) André André	Macron	Castro Electrónica
Vitória de Setúbal	(Angola) Lito Vidigal	(Portugal) Vasco Fernandes	Hummel	Kia Motors

=== Managerial changes ===
Team	Outgoing manager	Manner of departure	Date of vacancy	Position in table	Incoming manager	Date of appointment
Vitória de Setúbal	(Portugal) José Couceiro	End of contract	13 May 2018	Pre-season	(Portugal) Lito Vidigal	22 May 2018
Santa Clara	(Portugal) Carlos Pinto	End of contract	14 May 2018	Pre-season	(Portugal) João Henriques	31 May 2018
Vitória de Guimarães	(Portugal) José Peseiro	Mutual consent	15 May 2018	Pre-season	(Portugal) Luís Castro	21 May 2018
Moreirense	(Portugal) Petit	Mutual consent	20 May 2018	Pre-season	(Portugal) Ivo Vieira	29 May 2018
Chaves	(Portugal) Luís Castro	Mutual consent	21 May 2018	Pre-season	(Portugal) Daniel Ramos	8 June 2018
Portimonense	(Portugal) Vítor Oliveira	Mutual consent	5 June 2018	Pre-season	(Portugal) António Folha	2 July 2018
Sporting CP	(Portugal) Jorge Jesus	Mutual consent	6 June 2018	Pre-season	(Serbia) Siniša Mihajlović	18 June 2018
Marítimo	(Portugal) Daniel Ramos	Mutual consent	7 June 2018	Pre-season	(Portugal) Cláudio Braga	12 June 2018
Rio Ave	(Portugal) Miguel Cardoso	Resigned	13 June 2018	Pre-season	(Portugal) José Gomes	13 June 2018
Sporting CP	(Serbia) Siniša Mihajlović	Sacked	28 June 2018	Pre-season	(Portugal) José Peseiro	1 July 2018
Sporting CP	(Portugal) José Peseiro	Sacked	1 November 2018	5th	(Netherlands) Marcel Keizer	9 November 2018
Marítimo	(Portugal) Cláudio Braga	Resigned	26 November 2018	13th	(Portugal) Petit	27 November 2018
Rio Ave	(Portugal) José Gomes	Signed by Reading	22 December 2018	9th	(Portugal) Daniel Ramos	2 January 2019
Benfica	(Portugal) Rui Vitória	Mutual consent	3 January 2019	4th	(Portugal) Bruno Lage	3 January 2019

== Season summary ==
=== League table ===
Pos	Team	Pld	W	D	L	GF	GA	GD	Pts	Qualification or relegation
1	Benfica (C)	34	28	3	3	103	31	+72	87	Qualification for the Champions League group stage
2	Porto	34	27	4	3	74	20	+54	85	Qualification for the Champions League third qualifying round
3	Sporting CP	34	23	5	6	72	33	+39	74	Qualification for the Europa League group stage (Note: Since the winners of the 2018–19 Taça de Portugal, Sporting CP, qualified for European competition based on league position, the spot awarded to the third-placed team (Europa League third qualifying round) was passed to the fourth-placed team, and the spot awarded to the fourth-placed team (Europa League second qualifying round) was passed to the fifth-placed team.)
4	Braga	34	21	4	9	56	37	+19	67	Qualification for the Europa League third qualifying round
5	Vitória de Guimarães	34	15	7	12	46	34	+12	52 (Note: Vitória de Guimarães finished ahead of Moreirense on head-to-head points: Vitória de Guimarães 1–0 Moreirense, Moreirense 1–3 Vitória de Guimarães.)	Qualification for the Europa League second qualifying round
6	Moreirense	34	16	4	14	39	44	−5	52	
7	Rio Ave	34	12	9	13	50	52	−2	45	
8	Boavista	34	13	5	16	34	40	−6	44	
9	Belenenses SAD	34	10	13	11	42	51	−9	43	
10	Santa Clara	34	11	9	14	43	45	−2	42	
11	Marítimo	34	12	3	19	26	44	−18	39 (Note: Marítimo finished ahead of Portimonense on head-to-head away goals: Marítimo 2–1 Portimonense, Portimonense 3–2 Marítimo.)	
12	Portimonense	34	11	6	17	44	59	−15	39	
13	Vitória de Setúbal	34	8	12	14	28	39	−11	36 (Note: Vitória de Setúbal finished ahead of Desportivo das Aves on head-to-head goal difference: Vitória de Setúbal 2–0 Desportivo das Aves, Desportivo das Aves 2–1 Vitória de Setúbal.)	
14	Desportivo das Aves	34	10	6	18	35	49	−14	36	
15	Tondela	34	9	8	17	40	54	−14	35	
16	Chaves (R)	34	8	8	18	34	57	−23	32	Relegation to LigaPro
17	Nacional (R)	34	7	7	20	33	73	−40	28	Relegation to LigaPro
18	Feirense (R)	34	3	11	20	27	64	−37	20	Relegation to LigaPro

Source: Liga Portugal
Rules for classification: 1) Points; 2) Head-to-head points; 3) Head-to-head goal difference; 4) Head-to-head away goals scored; 5) Goal difference; 6) Matches won; 7) Goals scored; 8) Play-off.
(C) Champions; (R) Relegated

=== Positions by round ===
Team ╲ Round	1	2	3	4	5	6	7	8	9	10	11	12	13	14	15	16	17	18	19	20	21	22	23	24	25	26	27	28	29	30	31	32	33	34
Benfica	7	2	2	1	1	3	1	3	5	4	4	4	4	2	4	3	2	2	2	2	2	2	2	1	1	1	1	1	1	1	1	1	1	1
Porto	1	1	5	4	3	2	3	1	1	1	1	1	1	1	1	1	1	1	1	1	1	1	1	2	2	2	2	2	2	2	2	2	2	2
Sporting CP	3	2	2	3	5	4	5	5	3	2	2	2	2	3	2	4	4	4	4	4	4	4	4	4	4	4	3	3	3	3	3	3	3	3
Braga	2	5	1	2	2	1	2	2	2	3	3	3	3	4	3	2	3	3	3	3	3	3	3	3	3	3	4	4	4	4	4	4	4	4
Vitória de Guimarães	10	16	12	8	9	9	7	8	8	7	5	5	5	5	5	5	5	6	5	6	6	6	6	6	6	5	6	6	6	6	6	6	6	5
Moreirense	14	10	10	13	17	11	15	12	7	6	8	10	8	7	6	6	6	7	6	5	5	5	5	5	5	6	5	5	5	5	5	5	5	6
Rio Ave	15	7	7	7	4	5	4	4	4	5	6	6	6	10	10	9	9	10	9	9	8	8	9	9	10	9	9	9	9	8	8	7	7	7
Boavista	4	9	9	12	14	15	11	14	15	16	16	14	12	13	13	13	13	15	16	15	13	12	11	11	13	13	13	14	12	14	13	11	9	8
Belenenses SAD	8	7	7	10	8	12	12	9	10	10	9	7	7	6	8	5	5	5	7	7	7	7	7	7	7	7	7	7	7	7	7	9	10	9
Santa Clara	11	13	15	9	12	7	6	6	6	9	10	9	9	8	9	8	8	9	10	10	10	9	8	8	8	8	8	8	8	9	9	8	8	10
Marítimo	8	11	6	5	6	6	8	11	12	13	14	13	15	15	16	16	16	14	12	13	15	13	12	15	11	11	11	13	10	12	12	10	11	11
Portimonense	15	18	18	17	15	17	13	10	11	11	11	11	11	9	7	7	7	8	8	8	9	10	10	10	9	10	10	10	11	10	11	13	12	12
Vitória de Setúbal	4	6	11	11	13	14	10	7	9	8	7	8	10	11	12	10	10	11	11	11	12	15	13	14	15	15	14	11	13	13	14	14	13	13
Desportivo das Aves	15	15	17	17	18	16	18	18	16	12	13	15	14	16	15	15	15	17	15	16	14	16	16	13	12	12	12	12	14	11	10	12	14	14
Tondela	11	14	16	16	11	13	16	16	13	14	15	17	17	14	14	14	14	13	13	12	11	11	14	16	16	16	16	15	15	15	15	16	15	15
Chaves	18	12	14	14	10	10	14	15	17	18	18	18	18	18	18	18	18	18	17	17	17	17	17	17	17	17	17	17	17	16	16	15	16	16
Nacional	13	17	13	15	16	18	17	17	18	17	12	12	13	12	11	11	11	12	14	14	16	14	15	12	14	14	15	16	16	17	17	17	17	17
Feirense	4	4	4	6	7	8	9	13	14	15	17	16	16	17	17	17	17	16	18	18	18	18	18	18	18	18	18	18	18	18	18	18	18	18

Leader and UEFA Champions League group stage
UEFA Champions League third qualifying round
UEFA Europa League Third group stage
UEFA Europa League Second qualifying round
UEFA Europa League Third qualifying round
Relegation to LigaPro

Source: Liga Portugal (in Portuguese)

=== Results ===
Home \ Away	BEL	BEN	BOA	BRA	CHA	DAV	FEI	MAR	MOR	NAC	PRT	POR	RAV	STC	SCP	TON	VGU	VSE
Belenenses SAD	—	2–0	0–0	0–3	1–0	5–2	4–0	0–1	0–1	3–0	2–2	2–3	1–3	1–1	1–8	2–2	1–0	0–0
Benfica	2–2	—	5–1	6–2	4–0	2–0	4–0	6–0	1–3	10–0	5–1	1–0	4–2	4–1	1–1	1–0	3–2	4–2
Boavista	2–0	0–2	—	4–2	1–2	1–0	2–0	0–1	3–1	1–0	0–2	0–1	1–0	1–0	1–2	2–0	0–0	1–0
Braga	0–2	1–4	1–0	—	2–1	3–1	4–0	2–0	2–0	4–2	2–0	2–3	1–1	1–0	1–0	3–0	1–0	2–1
Chaves	2–2	2–2	1–1	0–1	—	1–2	0–0	1–0	1–2	4–1	2–0	1–4	1–1	0–0	1–3	2–1	0–1	1–2
Desportivo das Aves	3–0	0–3	2–0	0–2	0–1	—	1–1	0–1	0–1	2–3	3–0	0–1	2–1	1–2	1–3	2–2	1–1	2–1
Feirense	0–0	1–4	1–1	0–2	4–4	2–1	—	1–1	1–3	0–0	0–1	1–2	2–0	2–2	1–3	2–4	1–2	0–1
Marítimo	0–0	0–1	0–1	1–0	2–1	0–1	2–0	—	3–2	3–2	2–1	0–2	0–2	1–0	0–0	2–0	1–3	0–1
Moreirense	1–1	0–4	2–1	1–0	0–1	1–0	1–0	1–0	—	2–1	2–0	1–1	1–2	0–1	1–3	2–0	1–3	1–1
Nacional	0–1	0–4	0–0	0–3	2–0	0–0	4–0	1–0	1–2	—	0–1	0–4	0–1	0–3	0–1	3–2	1–0	0–0
Portimonense	1–1	2–0	0–2	1–1	0–1	1–1	1–0	3–2	0–2	5–1	—	0–3	0–1	2–2	4–2	3–2	3–2	3–1
Porto	3–0	1–2	2–0	1–0	5–0	4–0	2–0	3–0	3–0	3–1	4–1	—	2–1	1–0	2–1	1–0	2–3	2–0
Rio Ave	2–2	2–3	2–1	1–2	1–0	0–2	0–0	3–1	1–2	3–3	2–1	2–2	—	1–2	1–3	2–2	2–1	1–1
Santa Clara	2–3	0–2	4–2	3–3	1–0	0–0	4–4	0–1	1–1	2–0	2–1	1–2	1–3	—	1–2	1–2	1–0	0–0
Sporting CP	2–1	2–4	3–0	3–0	2–1	4–1	1–0	2–0	2–1	5–2	3–1	0–0	3–0	1–0	—	1–1	2–0	2–1
Tondela	0–1	1–3	1–0	0–1	5–2	0–2	1–1	2–1	2–0	1–1	3–2	0–3	1–1	1–3	2–1	—	1–0	1–2
Vitória de Guimarães	5–1	0–1	3–1	1–1	4–0	0–2	0–1	1–0	1–0	2–2	2–0	0–0	3–2	2–0	1–0	1–0	—	1–1
Vitória de Setúbal	0–0	0–1	0–3	0–1	0–0	2–0	2–1	1–0	3–0	1–2	1–1	0–2	1–3	0–2	1–1	0–0	1–1	—

Updated to match(es) played on 19 May 2019. Source: Liga Portugal
Legend: Blue = home team win; Yellow = draw; Red = away team win.
For upcoming matches, an "a" indicates there is an article about the rivalry between the two participants.

== Statistics ==
=== Top goalscorers ===
Rank	Player	Club	Goals
1	(Switzerland) Haris Seferovic	Benfica	23
2	(Portugal) Bruno Fernandes	Sporting CP	20
3	(Portugal) Rafa Silva	Benfica	17
4	(Netherlands) Bas Dost	Sporting CP	15
4	(Portugal) João Félix	Benfica	15
4	(Brazil) Tiquinho Soares	Porto	15
4	(Portugal) Dyego Sousa	Braga	15
8	(Portugal) Pizzi	Benfica	13
9	(Portugal) (Angola) ^{1} Wilson Eduardo	Braga	12
9	(Portugal) Tomané	Tondela	12

1. A former Portuguese international player at youth levels, Eduardo switched allegiances to play for Angola during the season.

=== Top assists ===
Rank	Player	Club	Assists
1	(Portugal) Pizzi	Benfica	19
2	(Portugal) Bruno Fernandes	Sporting CP	13
3	(Portugal) André Almeida	Benfica	12
3	(Spain) Álex Grimaldo	Benfica	12
5	(Mexico) Jesús Corona	Porto	9
5	(Argentina) Marcos Acuña	Sporting CP	9
7	(Brazil) Alex Telles	Porto	8
8	(Brazil) Otávio	Porto	7
8	(Portugal) João Félix	Benfica	7
8	(Portugal) António Xavier	Tondela	7
8	(Portugal) Nuno Sequeira	Braga	7
8	(Portugal) Chiquinho	Moreirense	7

=== Hat-tricks ===
Player	For	Against	Result	Date
(Portugal) Pizzi	Benfica	Vitória de Guimarães	3–2 (H)	10 August 2018
(Portugal) Vítor Gomes	Aves	Portimonense	3–0 (H)	1 October 2018
(Portugal) Hildeberto Pereira	Vitória de Setúbal	Moreirense	3–0 (H)	6 October 2018
(Portugal) Dyego Sousa	Braga	Feirense	4–0 (H)	14 December 2018
(Brazil) Tiquinho Soares	Porto	Chaves	1–4 (A)	18 January 2019
(Uzbekistan) Sardor Rashidov	Nacional	Feirense	4–0 (H)	16 February 2019
(Brazil) William	Chaves	Nacional	4–1 (H)	28 April 2019
(Portugal) Bruno Fernandes	Sporting CP	Belenenses SAD	1–8 (A)	5 May 2019
(Brazil) Guilherme Schettine	Santa Clara	Feirense	4–4 (H)	11 May 2019

== Awards ==
=== Monthly awards ===
Month	Manager of the Month		Player of the Month		Goal of the Month		
Month	Manager	Club	Player	Club	Player	Club	Against/Date
August	(Portugal) Nuno Manta Santos	Feirense	(Portugal) Pizzi	Benfica	(Brazil) Éber Bessa	Vitória de Setúbal	Nacional; 26 August
September	(Portugal) Abel Ferreira	Braga	(Japan) Shoya Nakajima	Portimonense	(Iraq) Osama Rashid	Santa Clara	Nacional; 30 September
October/November	(Portugal) Sérgio Conceição	Porto	(Netherlands) Bas Dost	Sporting CP	(Brazil) Niltinho	Chaves	Sporting CP; 11 November
December	(Portugal) Sérgio Conceição	Porto	(Portugal) Bruno Fernandes	Sporting CP	(Cape Verde) Jovane Cabral	Sporting CP	Rio Ave; 3 December
January	(Portugal) Ivo Vieira	Moreirense	(Portugal) João Félix	Benfica	(Spain) Álex Grimaldo	Benfica	Boavista; 29 January
February	(Portugal) Bruno Lage	Benfica	(Portugal) Bruno Fernandes	Sporting CP	(Bulgaria) Steven Petkov	Feirense	Sporting CP; 10 February
March	(Portugal) Bruno Lage	Benfica	(Portugal) Bruno Fernandes	Sporting CP	(Portugal) Edgar Costa	Marítimo	Nacional; 31 March
April	(Portugal) Bruno Lage	Benfica	(Portugal) Bruno Fernandes	Sporting CP	(Portugal) Rafa Silva	Benfica	

Month	Goalkeeper of the Month		Defender of the Month		Midfielder of the Month		Forward of the Month	
Month	Player	Club	Player	Club	Player	Club	Player	Club
August	(Brazil) Caio Secco	Feirense	(Portugal) Diogo Leite	Porto	(Portugal) Pizzi	Benfica	(Portugal) Edinho	Feirense
September	(Brazil) Caio Secco	Feirense	(Brazil) Éder Militão	Porto	(Portugal) Stephen Eustáquio	Chaves	(Brazil) Dyego Sousa	Braga
October/November	(Spain) Iker Casillas	Porto	(Brazil) Éder Militão	Porto	(Portugal) Bruno Fernandes	Sporting CP	(Netherlands) Bas Dost	Sporting CP
December	(Brazil) Muriel	Belenenses SAD	(Brazil) Éder Militão	Porto	(Portugal) Bruno Fernandes	Sporting CP	(Netherlands) Bas Dost	Sporting CP
January	(Brazil) Jhonatan	Moreirense	(Brazil) Éder Militão	Porto	(Portugal) Bruno Fernandes	Sporting CP	(Brazil) Dyego Sousa	Braga
February	(Greece) Odisseas Vlachodimos	Benfica	(Spain) Álex Grimaldo	Benfica	(Portugal) Bruno Fernandes	Sporting CP	(Switzerland) Haris Seferovic	Benfica
March	(Brazil) Charles	Marítimo	(Portugal) Ferro	Benfica	(Portugal) Bruno Fernandes	Sporting CP	(Brazil) Tiquinho Soares	Porto
April	(Brazil) Charles	Marítimo	(Brazil) Rodrigo Soares	Desportivo das Aves	(Portugal) Bruno Fernandes	Sporting CP	(Brazil) Luiz Phellype	Sporting CP

=== Annual awards ===
Annual awards were announced on 5 July 2019.

Award	Winner	Club
Player of the Season	(Portugal) Bruno Fernandes	Sporting CP
Manager of the Season	(Portugal) Bruno Lage	Benfica
Goal of the Season	(Cape Verde) Jovane Cabral	Sporting CP
Young Player of the Season	(Portugal) João Félix	Benfica
Top scorer	(Switzerland) Haris Seferovic	Benfica
Player Fair-Play Prize	(Brazil) Éder Militão	Porto
Club Fair-Play Prize	Belenenses SAD	
Turf of the Season	Portimonense	

=== Team of the Year ===
Team of the Year
Goalkeeper	(Spain) Iker Casillas (Porto)			
Defenders	(Brazil) Alex Telles (Porto)	(Brazil) Éder Militão (Porto)	(France) Jérémy Mathieu (Sporting CP)	(Spain) Álex Grimaldo (Benfica)
Midfielders	(Portugal) João Félix (Benfica)		(Portugal) Bruno Fernandes (Sporting CP)	(Mexico) Héctor Herrera (Porto)
Attackers	(Switzerland) Haris Seferovic (Benfica)		(Mali) Moussa Marega (Porto)	(Portugal) Rafa Silva (Benfica)

== Attendances ==
No.	Club	Average attendance	Change	Highest
1	Benfica	53,824	1,2%	64,064
2	Porto	41,626	-2,5%	49,220
3	Sporting	33,691	-22,8%	45,503
4	Vitória	18,249	14,0%	27,435
5	Braga	12,035	2,8%	24,046
6	Boavista	8,155	45,0%	19,592
7	Marítimo	6,622	-6,4%	9,830
8	Vitória Setúbal	4,784	16,4%	10,628
9	Chaves	4,550	25,4%	7,783
10	Santa Clara	4,010	97,4%	10,000
11	Rio Ave	3,630	-6,7%	8,836
12	Portimonense	3,313	4,9%	5,989
13	Feirense	3,049	-22,0%	5,449
14	Belenenses	2,889	-13,6%	10,901
15	Tondela	2,702	13,8%	4,985
16	Nacional	2,595	34,9%	4,793
17	Aves	2,454	-6,9%	5,338
18	Moreirense	2,275	0,5%	5,510
