= Daniel Ramos (footballer) =

Portuguese football manager and former player

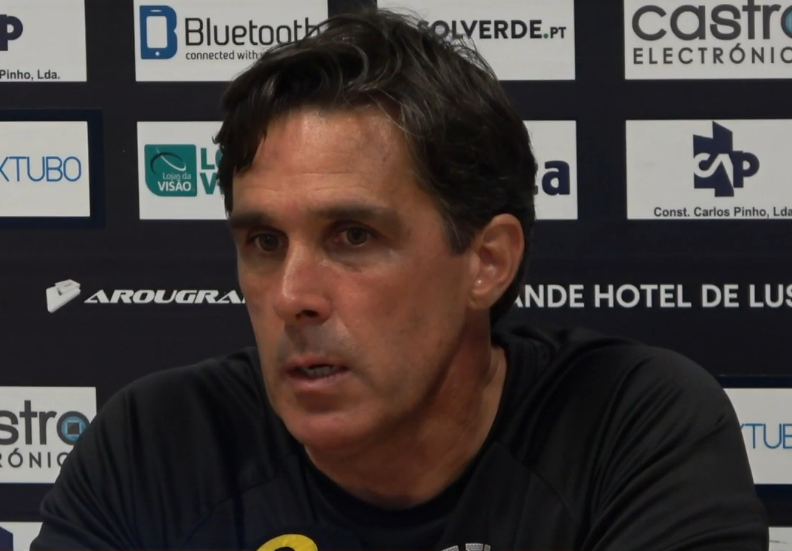
- Ramos with Arouca in 2023

Personal information
- Full name: Daniel António Lopes Ramos
- Date of birth: 25 December 1970 (age 55)
- Place of birth: Vila do Conde, Portugal
- Position: Midfielder

Youth career
- 1985–1989: Rio Ave

Senior career*
| Years | Team | Apps | (Gls) |
| 1989–1991 | Rio Ave | 32 | (5) |
| 1991–1993 | Maia | 13 | (1) |
| 1993 | Leça | 0 | (0) |
| 1994 | Castêlo da Maia | | |
| 1994–1995 | Senhora da Hora | | |
| 1995–1996 | Beira-Mar | 3 | (0) |
| 1996–1997 | Marco | 1 | (0) |
| 1997–1998 | Vilanovense | | |

Managerial career
- 2001–2002: Vilanovense
- 2002–2004: Dragões Sandinenses
- 2004: Chaves
- 2005–2007: Trofense
- 2007–2008: Moreirense
- 2008–2009: Gondomar
- 2009–2010: Vizela
- 2010: Trofense
- 2010–2011: União Madeira
- 2011–2012: Naval
- 2012–2013: Ribeirão
- 2014–2016: Famalicão
- 2016: Santa Clara
- 2016–2018: Marítimo
- 2018: Chaves
- 2019: Rio Ave
- 2019–2020: Boavista
- 2020–2021: Santa Clara
- 2021–2022: Al Faisaly
- 2023: Arouca
- 2024–2025: AVS
- 2025–2026: Henan
- * Club domestic league appearances and goals

Daniel António Lopes Ramos (born 25 December 1970) is a Portuguese former professional footballer who played as a midfielder, currently a manager.

After a playing career spent mostly at the lower levels, he embarked on a managerial career of over two decades. He led six clubs in the second tier, and seven in the Primeira Liga.

== Playing career ==
Born in Vila do Conde, Ramos' professional input during his nine-year senior career consisted of nine Segunda Liga games, with Rio Ave FC (six) and S.C. Beira-Mar (three). He retired in June 1998, aged only 27.

== Coaching career ==
Ramos started working as a coach with his last club Vilanovense FC, in 2001. In the following years he alternated between the second and third divisions, his first job at the professional level being with G.D. Chaves in the 2004–05 campaign. In June 2011, he won the third-tier title with C.F. União, and left days later for Associação Naval 1º de Maio.

In early 2014, Ramos was appointed at division three side F.C. Famalicão, achieving promotion in his first full season and leaving on 17 May 2016. Shortly after, he signed a one-year contract with C.D. Santa Clara also in the second tier.

On 22 September 2016, after six wins and one draw in the first seven games, Ramos left the Azores and joined C.S. Marítimo of the Primeira Liga, then ranking second from bottom in the table. He eventually led his team to the sixth place, with the subsequent qualification for the UEFA Europa League.

With a year left on his Marítimo contract, Ramos moved back to Chaves in June 2018 for a fee of around €100,000 after their loss of Luís Castro to Vitória de Guimarães. He resigned by mutual consent on 10 December, with the team in last place.

At the start of 2019, Ramos was hired by Rio Ave for the rest of the season after José Gomes moved to Reading. After he guided them to seventh place, both parties agreed not to renew.

On 18 December 2019, Ramos was appointed at Boavista F.C. for the second half of the campaign; the Porto-based club had sacked Lito Vidigal when eighth in the league. At the end of the season he returned to Santa Clara, replacing João Henriques on a one-year deal. The side finished a best-ever sixth and qualified for the inaugural edition of the UEFA Europa Conference League; he was awarded with a 12-month extension.

In October 2021, Ramos rescinded his contract and moved abroad for the first time, signing a two-year deal at Al Faisaly FC in the Saudi Professional League. The following 24 February, after only one win in ten matches, he left by mutual consent.

Ramos returned to his country's top flight on 30 May 2023, succeeding Armando Evangelista on a two-year deal at F.C. Arouca. On 15 November, with the team bottom after just one victory in 11 games, he was dismissed.

== Managerial statistics ==
As of match played 8 November 2026

Managerial record by team and tenure
| Team | Nat | From | To | Record | | | | | | | |
| Team | Nat | From | To | G | W | D | L | GF | GA | GD | Win % |
|---|---|---|---|---|---|---|---|---|---|---|---|
| Vilanovense | (Portugal) | 21 October 2001 | 4 June 2002 | 32 | 11 | 9 | 12 | 54 | 49 | +5 | 34.38 |
| Dragões Sandinenses | (Portugal) | 4 June 2002 | 25 April 2004 | 73 | 38 | 16 | 19 | 122 | 78 | +44 | 52.05 |
| Chaves | (Portugal) | 15 May 2004 | 28 November 2004 | 14 | 3 | 3 | 8 | 8 | 14 | −6 | 21.43 |
| Trofense | (Portugal) | 1 July 2005 | 21 May 2007 | 62 | 26 | 16 | 20 | 76 | 56 | +20 | 41.94 |
| Moreirense | (Portugal) | 14 November 2007 | 17 June 2008 | 26 | 15 | 5 | 6 | 41 | 18 | +23 | 57.69 |
| Gondomar | (Portugal) | 18 June 2008 | 31 May 2009 | 37 | 10 | 10 | 17 | 37 | 43 | −6 | 27.03 |
| Vizela | (Portugal) | 6 July 2009 | 8 February 2010 | 19 | 8 | 8 | 3 | 26 | 14 | +12 | 42.11 |
| Trofense | (Portugal) | 9 February 2010 | 12 May 2010 | 12 | 6 | 2 | 4 | 21 | 19 | +2 | 50.00 |
| União Madeira | (Portugal) | 1 July 2010 | 13 June 2011 | 38 | 25 | 8 | 5 | 69 | 25 | +44 | 65.79 |
| Naval | (Portugal) | 14 June 2011 | 3 April 2012 | 33 | 12 | 12 | 9 | 41 | 35 | +6 | 36.36 |
| Ribeirão | (Portugal) | 12 November 2012 | 26 August 2013 | 23 | 11 | 8 | 4 | 34 | 19 | +15 | 47.83 |
| Famalicão | (Portugal) | 26 February 2014 | 17 May 2016 | 103 | 56 | 30 | 17 | 160 | 90 | +70 | 54.37 |
| Santa Clara | (Portugal) | 3 June 2016 | 22 September 2016 | 8 | 7 | 1 | 0 | 12 | 3 | +9 | 87.50 |
| Marítimo | (Portugal) | 22 September 2016 | 6 June 2018 | 80 | 33 | 25 | 22 | 89 | 90 | −1 | 41.25 |
| Chaves | (Portugal) | 6 June 2018 | 10 December 2018 | 17 | 5 | 3 | 9 | 17 | 22 | −5 | 29.41 |
| Rio Ave | (Portugal) | 3 January 2019 | 23 May 2019 | 19 | 7 | 5 | 7 | 26 | 27 | −1 | 36.84 |
| Boavista | (Portugal) | 18 December 2019 | 28 July 2020 | 20 | 6 | 3 | 11 | 16 | 26 | −10 | 30.00 |
| Santa Clara | (Portugal) | 28 July 2020 | 5 October 2021 | 54 | 22 | 12 | 20 | 69 | 61 | +8 | 40.74 |
| Al Faisaly | (Saudi Arabia) | 7 October 2021 | 24 February 2022 | 16 | 2 | 7 | 7 | 15 | 24 | −9 | 12.50 |
| Arouca | (Portugal) | 30 May 2023 | 15 November 2023 | 17 | 5 | 3 | 9 | 19 | 25 | −6 | 29.41 |
| AVS | (Portugal) | 15 November 2024 | 10 February 2025 | 11 | 1 | 5 | 5 | 9 | 15 | −6 | 9.09 |
| Henan | (China) | 29 April 2025 | 10 November 2026 | 59 | 21 | 16 | 22 | 108 | 108 | +0 | 35.59 |
| Career total | | | | 775 | 330 | 209 | 236 | 1,067 | 863 | +204 | 42.58 |
