= Silas (Portuguese footballer) =

Portuguese football manager and former player (born 1976)

Personal information
- Full name: Jorge Manuel Rebelo Fernandes
- Date of birth: 1 September 1976 (age 50)
- Place of birth: Lisbon, Portugal
- Height: 1.76 m (5 ft 9 in)
- Position: Midfielder

Team information
- Current team: AVS (manager)

Youth career
- 1986–1987: Domingos Sávio
- 1987–1989: Sporting CP
- 1989–1995: Atlético

Senior career*
Years	Team	Apps	(Gls)
1995–1998	Atlético	70	(4)
1998–2001	Ceuta	65	(20)
1999–2000	→ Elche (loan)	35	(1)
2001–2003	União Leiria	64	(13)
2003–2006	Wolverhampton Wanderers	9	(0)
2004–2005	→ Marítimo (loan)	17	(2)
2005–2006	→ Belenenses (loan)	28	(4)
2006–2009	Belenenses	86	(7)
2009–2010	União Leiria	41	(3)
2011–2012	AEL Limassol	43	(2)
2012–2013	AEP	16	(3)
2013–2014	Ethnikos Achna	46	(3)
2014–2015	Atlético	44	(10)
2015	NorthEast United	12	(1)
2016–2017	Cova Piedade	39	(7)
Total		615	(80)

International career
2003	Portugal	3	(0)

Managerial career
- 2018: Belenenses
- 2018–2019: B-SAD
- 2019–2020: Sporting CP
- 2021: Famalicão
- 2022: AEL Limassol
- 2023–2024: Mafra
- 2024: Marítimo
- 2024–2025: União Leiria
- 2025: Farense
- 2026–: AVS
- * Club domestic league appearances and goals

Jorge Manuel Rebelo Fernandes (born 1 September 1976), known as Silas, is a Portuguese former professional footballer who played as a midfielder. He is currently manager of Liga Portugal 2 club AVS.

He amassed Primeira Liga totals of 236 matches and 30 goals over nine seasons, representing in the competition União de Leiria, Marítimo and Belenenses. He also represented clubs in four other countries, mainly Spain and Cyprus.

Silas began managing in 2018, leading four teams in his country's top flight.

== Playing career ==
=== Beginnings and U. Leiria ===
Silas was born in Lisbon. He spent two years of his childhood in the academy of Sporting CP, where he received his nickname for his resemblance to Brazilian first-team player Paulo Silas. Following his release, he chose Atlético Clube de Portugal due to its proximity to his grandmother's house in Campolide.

After three years there as a professional from 1995, he emigrated to Spain, representing lowly Ceuta who also loaned him for one season to Elche in the Segunda División. During his time in the North African exclave, he was struck by a concrete block when walking past a construction site, and required eleven stitches in his head.

Silas first made his name at União de Leiria, with whom he achieved a couple of top six Primeira Liga finishes, also making the Taça de Portugal final in 2003. During 2001–02, he was managed by up-and-coming José Mourinho, and the following campaign made his first appearance for the Portugal national team, in a 1–0 friendly win over Macedonia on 3 April 2003; he later played against Paraguay and Bolivia.

=== Wolverhampton and Belenenses ===
Silas signed for newly promoted Premier League club Wolverhampton Wanderers in July 2003, for an initial fee of £1 million. However, he endured a frustrating time in England, failing to settle in the country and establish himself in the squad; he made a mere nine league appearances during their doomed season, totalling 14 overall.

In the summer of 2004, Silas returned to his homeland and joined top division side Marítimo on a season-long loan. The following campaign, still not featuring in the Wolves manager's plans (now Glenn Hoddle) he was loaned out to another team in the country and tier, this time Belenenses.

At the end of the season, having made 28 appearances with four goals, Silas decided to make his move permanent, joining on a free transfer as his contract at Wolverhampton had expired. He continued to be an undisputed starter from 2006 to 2009, after which he was released and returned to Leiria, recently returned to the top flight.

=== Later career ===
From 2011 to 2014, Silas competed in the Cypriot First Division, representing AEL Limassol, AEP and Ethnikos Achna. In July 2014, after a 16-year absence, he returned to Atlético, now in the Segunda Liga. In April of the following year he, alongside teammate Dady, was involved in a match fixing allegation whereby it was alleged that both had approached Farense players with a bribe to facilitate Atlético's win, but nothing was ever proven. The season initially ended in relegation, but the team eventually was spared at the expense of Beira-Mar, who dropped down a tier due to irregularities.

On 8 July 2015, shortly before his 39th birthday, Silas signed a six-month deal with Indian Super League side NorthEast United. He made his debut on 6 October, playing the full 90 minutes in 3–1 loss at Kerala Blasters. On 11 November, a minute after coming on as a substitute for his compatriot Simão, he scored his first goal for the Guwahati-based team, the decisive one in a 2–1 victory away to Chennaiyin.

Silas returned to his homeland on 12 February 2016, joining Cova da Piedade. He helped them to the third division title and a first promotion to the professional leagues, scoring the winning penalty in the final shootout against Vizela on 5 June 2016.

== Coaching career ==
Silas retired at the end of the season, at the age of 40. His first coaching experience was as manager of the Portuguese footballers' union in 2017.

On 16 January 2018, Silas replaced Domingos Paciência at former club Belenenses. His first game in charge occurred four days later, and he led his team to a 0–0 away draw against Marítimo. In December 2018 he was named "Manager of the Month", and he achieved final positions of 12th and ninth in his first two years, being dismissed from his position at the reorganised B-SAD on 4 September 2019 when the team had not scored in their first four games of the campaign.

Late in the same month, Silas succeeded Leonel Pontes at the helm of Sporting on a contract running until June 2020. On 4 March 2020, he was relieved of his duties and replaced by Braga's Ruben Amorim, who became Sporting's fourth coach of the season.

Silas completed his UEFA Pro Licence course on 14 November 2020. The following 1 February, he took over from the dismissed João Pedro Sousa at Famalicão on a one-and-a-half-year deal. He left on 8 March, after his one win in six games left them second from bottom.

Silas was appointed head coach of AEL Limassol on 12 May 2022, being fired in September. He returned home on 13 June 2023, on a one-year deal at second-tier Mafra.

On 5 September 2024, Silas replaced Fábio Pereira at the helm of Marítimo in the same league. He left one month later, following a run-in with the board of directors.

Subsequently, Silas led second division sides Farense and AVS.

== Managerial statistics ==
As of match played 16 September 2022

Managerial record by team and tenure
Team	Nat	From	To	Record							
Team	Nat	From	To	G	W	D	L	GF	GA	GD	Win %
Belenenses	(Portugal)	16 January 2018	14 May 2018	16	4	6	6	17	21	−4	25.00
B-SAD	(Portugal)	14 May 2018	4 September 2019	45	12	15	18	51	66	−15	26.67
Sporting CP	(Portugal)	27 September 2019	4 March 2020	28	17	1	10	45	32	+13	60.71
Famalicão	(Portugal)	1 February 2021	8 March 2021	6	1	2	3	1	7	−6	16.67
AEL Limassol	(Cyprus)	21 May 2022	17 September 2022	4	0	1	3	2	5	−3	0.00
Total				99	34	25	40	116	131	−15	34.34

== Honours ==
AEL Limassol

- Cypriot First Division: 2011–12

Cova Piedade

- Campeonato de Portugal: 2015–16
