= Osama Rashid =

Iraqi footballer (born 1992)

Personal information
- Full name: Osama Jabbar Shafeeq Rashid
- Date of birth: 17 January 1992 (age 34)
- Place of birth: Kirkuk, Iraq
- Height: 1.80 m (5 ft 11 in)
- Position: Midfielder

Team information
- Current team: Erbil SC
- Number: 23

Youth career
- 1998–1999: ZOB
- 1999–2011: Feyenoord

Senior career*
Years	Team	Apps	(Gls)
2011–2012	Den Bosch	13	(2)
2012–2013	Excelsior Maassluis	20	(5)
2013–2015	Alphense Boys	34	(15)
2015–2016	Farense	41	(6)
2016–2017	Lokomotiv Plovdiv	5	(0)
2017–2021	Santa Clara	108	(21)
2021	Gaziantep	14	(0)
2021–2022	Khor Fakkan	13	(0)
2022–2024	Vizela	36	(1)
2024–	Erbil SC		

International career^{‡}
2007–2008	Netherlands U16	3	(0)
2008–2009	Netherlands U17	11	(2)
2009–2010	Netherlands U19	2	(1)
2011–	Iraq	41	(2)
Medal record
Representing Iraq
WAFF Championship
Runner-up	2012 Kuwait
Representing Netherlands
UEFA European Under-17 Championship
Runner-up	2009 Germany
- * Club domestic league appearances and goals as of 26/12/24 @ 20:06(AEST) ‡ National team caps and goals as of 7 September 2025

Osama Jabbar Shafeeq Rashid (Arabic: أُسَامَة جَبَّار شَفِيق رَشِيد; born 17 January 1992) is an Iraqi professional footballer who plays as a midfielder for Erbil SC and the Iraq national team.

== Club career ==
=== Youth career ===
Born in Kirkuk, Iraq, Rashid joined Feyenoord in 1999 from ZOB, an amateur club from Zuidoostbeemster. He spent more than a decade with the youth setup of the club and was part of one of the most promising crops of players to ever graduate from the academy in recent years. Other graduates included Stefan de Vrij, Jordy Clasie, Bruno Martins Indi, and Luc Castaignos amongst others. Rashid suffered an Injury in the 2009 UEFA European Under-17 Championship which prevented him from training with the first which he believes affected his chances with the first team. Rashid was not offered a professional contract once he turned 18 years old and therefore did not continue his career with Feyenoord.

=== Den Bosch and failed transfer to Werder Bremen ===
Rashid signed for FC Den Bosch following his release from Feyenoord. He played the 2011–12 season in the Eerste Divisie, the second division of professional football in the Netherlands. He played 12 times scoring twice while Den Bosch finished sixth in the league and failed to qualify to the Eredivisie. Rashid left Den Bosch at the end of the season.

In 2012, Wolfgang Sidka, a former Werder Bremen player who was coach of Iraq at the time, arranged a trial for Rashid at the Bundesliga club. He was invited for another trial and was ultimately offered a contract by Werder Bremen, which he turned down citing his desire to finish his studies. Rashid has since stated that negotiations between Feyenoord and Werder Bremen had failed even though Feyenoord were not entitled to financial compensation.

=== Excelsior Maassluis ===
Looking for more game time, Rashid signed for third tier side Excelsior Maassluis for the 2012–13 season. He played 20 times scoring five goals in the league.

=== Alphense Boys ===
In 2013, Rashid signed for Alphense Boys in the fifth tier of Dutch football. Having played 34 matches in which he scored 15 goals, he left the club at the end of the 2014–15 season to join SC Farense in Portugal.

=== Farense ===
Rashid signed for S.C. Farense in the second-highest Portuguese division. He made his debut on 8 August 2015 against Académico Viseu. He scored his first goal against Covilhã on matchday 7. Rashid was a regular in the team making league 41 appearances, scoring 6 times. He then received an offer from Bulgaria, allowing him to play in a top division of a country for the first time in his career.

=== Lokomotiv Plovdiv ===
Rashid finally got his share of top flight football after signing for Bulgarian side Lokomotiv Plovdiv. He made his debut as a late substitute against Slavia Sofia on matchday 3. Rashid left Bulgaria quickly as he failed to adjust to life there and returned to Portugal joining C.D. Santa Clara.

=== Santa Clara ===
Rashid's signing was announced by LigaPro side Santa Clara on 24 January 2017. He made his debut for Santa Clara as a second-half substitute in a match versus Gil Vicente on 12 February. He had his first start on three days later in 2–0 win against Cova Piedade and scored his first goal. The team finished the season in 10th position, missing out on promotion.

At the start of the following season, Rashid scored in his first matches of the season in both the cup and the league. He then scored three more goals in the following three games, to start the season scoring in each of the first four league games. He registered his first assist on 9 September against CF União Madeira in his team's 2–1 win. Rashid was injured in January and it took him almost three months to recover, he returned to action against CD Nacional, assisting twice in a 3–3 draw. Rashid then scored in the next two games, against Famalicão and Oliveirense to help Santa Clara win promotion and reach Primeira Liga.

In his first season in the Portuguese top flight. Osama scored three and assisted another three in his first six games of the season. He started the first 14 games playing as a left, centre, or defensive midfielder. He missed the next four games on international duty at the 2019 Asian Cup, in which Iraq was knocked out in the round of sixteen by eventual champions Qatar. On the matchday 21 fixture against Boavista Osama ruptured his knee ligament and was subbed off in the 31st minute. He missed five games due to injury, before returning as a second-half substitute against Vitória Guimarães. He ended the domestic season with 25 games, 7 goals, and six assists while Santa Clara finished in 10th place with 42 points.

=== Gaziantep ===
On 23 January 2021, Rashid signed with Turkish club Gaziantep for 1 1/2 seasons. until the end of the season. In a press release, Santa Clara said it had accepted the athlete's "request to leave", who received a "proposal for an attractive project, both from a sporting and financial point of view". The Azoreans also highlight that the Iraqi arrived in the Azores as a "perfect unknown" and who after five seasons became a "leading figure of the institution", a "son of the land" and a "living legend" of the club. “To Rashid, one of the greatest ever in our history" Osama only lasted half a season with Gazintep, his performance did not meet expectations as the club went from 4th on the day of his arrival to finishing 15th at the end of the season.

=== Khor Fakkan ===
On 8 June 2021, Rashid signed with UAE club Khor Fakkan.

== International career ==
=== Netherlands U-17 ===
Having moved to the Netherlands as a child, Rashid was eligible and played for the Netherlands U17 team representing them 11 times. He was part of the squad that played the 2009 UEFA European Under-17 Championship reaching the final of the tournament which was lost to Germany. Rashid made two appearances for the Dutch U19 team.

=== Iraq national team ===
Rashid switched allegiance to his birth country of Iraq, when the national team was managed by former Brazilian footballer Zico, and made his debut in a 6–0 defeat to Brazil. He was called up to the 2015 AFC Asian Cup in Australia where Iraq finished 4th.

Rashid was mainly overlooked in the following four years, making sporadic appearances as Iraq went through six managers in four years. Nonetheless, Iraq's manager Srečko Katanec brought Rashid back to the team for the 2019 Asian Cup. He played a disappointing 45 minutes in Iraq's first game, a 3–2 win against Vietnam, and did not feature the rest of the tournament as Iraq were knocked out in the round of 16 by eventual champions Qatar.

== Personal life ==
Osama has a degree in Sports Marketing, and is a fan of Spanish club Real Madrid.

== Career statistics ==
=== Club ===
As of match played 23 December 2023

Appearances and goals by club, season and competition
Club	Season	League			National cup		League cup		Continental		Total	
Club	Season	Division	Apps	Goals	Apps	Goals	Apps	Goals	Apps	Goals	Apps	Goals
Farense	2015–16	LigaPro	41	6	3	1	—		—		44	7
Lokomotiv Plovdiv	2016–17	Bulgarian First League	5	0	1	1	—		—		6	1
Santa Clara	2016–17	LigaPro	17	3	0	0	0	0	—		17	3
Santa Clara	2017–18	LigaPro	25	8	6	2	0	0	—		31	10
Santa Clara	2018–19	Primeira Liga	25	7	2	0	0	0	—		27	7
Santa Clara	2019–20	Primeira Liga	27	2	4	2	0	0	—		31	4
Santa Clara	2020–21	Primeira Liga	14	1	3	0	0	0	—		17	1
Santa Clara	Total		108	21	15	0	0	0	0	0	123	25
Gaziantep	2020–21	Süper Lig	14	0	0	0	—		—		14	0
Khor Fakkan	2021–22	UAE Pro League	13	0	0	0	5	1	—		18	1
Vizela	2021–22	Primeira Liga	11	0	0	0	0	0	—		11	0
Vizela	2022–23	Primeira Liga	18	1	1	0	2	0	—		21	0
Vizela	2023–24	Primeira Liga	5	0	0	0	2	0	—		7	0
Vizela	Total		34	1	1	0	4	0	0	0	39	1
Career total			215	28	20	6	9	1	0	0	244	34

=== International ===
As of match played 26 March 2024

Appearances and goals by national team and year
National team	Year	Apps	Goals
Iraq	2011	1	0
Iraq	2012	5	0
Iraq	2014	3	0
Iraq	2015	4	0
Iraq	2016	1	0
Iraq	2018	3	0
Iraq	2019	3	0
Iraq	2023	7	1
Iraq	2024	6	1
Total		33	2

Scores and results list Iraq's goal tally first, score column indicates score after each Rashid goal.

List of international goals scored by Osama Rashid
No.	Date	Venue	Opponent	Score	Result	Competition
1	16 November 2023	Basra International Stadium, Basra, Iraq	Indonesia	3–1	5–1	2026 FIFA World Cup qualifying
2	15 January 2024	Ahmad bin Ali Stadium, Al Rayyan, Qatar	Indonesia	2–1	3–1	2023 AFC Asian Cup

== Honours ==
Iraq

- WAFF Championship runner-up: 2012

Individual

- Primeira Liga Goal of the Month: September 2018
