= Bruno Lopes (football manager) =

Portuguese football manager

Personal information
- Full name: Bruno Alexandre Carvalho Lopes
- Date of birth: 11 April 1984 (age 42)
- Place of birth: Coimbra, Portugal

Youth career
- 1997–1998: Guia
- 1998–2002: Ferreiras

Senior career*
Years	Team	Apps	(Gls)
2004–2005	Padernense		

Managerial career
- 2010–2013: Ferreiras (youth)
- 2013–2014: Imortal (youth)
- 2014: Dayton Dutch Lions (assistant)
- 2015: Cincinnati Dutch Lions (assistant)
- 2016–2017: Dayton Dutch Lions (assistant)
- 2019–2020: Portimonense U23
- 2020: Portimonense (interim)
- 2020–2021: Cefn Druids
- 2021: Bahia U23
- 2021: Bahia (interim)
- 2021–2022: Bahia (assistant)
- * Club domestic league appearances and goals

Bruno Alexandre Carvalho Lopes (born 11 April 1984) is a Portuguese football manager and former player.

== Career ==
Born in Coimbra, Lopes only played amateur football as a senior, and started coaching after retiring. After working in the youth categories of F.C. Ferreiras and Imortal D.C., he moved to the United States and was an assistant coach at Dayton Dutch Lions and Cincinnati Dutch Lions.

Upon returning to Portugal, Lopes joined António Folha's staff at Portimonense S.C., initially as a scout. In January 2019, he was named manager of the club's under-23 squad, after Luís Boa Morte left.

On 19 January 2020, Lopes was appointed interim manager of Portimonense's main squad, after Folha was sacked. He managed the club for three matches before returning to his previous role.

On 7 September 2020, Lopes was named manager of Welsh club Cefn Druids. He was dismissed the following 10 March, and took over Bahia's under-23 side on 14 June 2021.
