= Joaquim Rolão Preto =

Portuguese footballer and manager

Rolão Preto
Personal information
- Full name: Joaquim José Correia Rolão Preto
- Date of birth: 5 November 1959 (age 66)
- Place of birth: Fundão, Portugal
- Position: Midfielder

Team information
- Current team: Portimonense (Assistant)

Senior career*
Years	Team	Apps	(Gls)
1978–1980	Eléctrico		
1980–1982	Carvalhais		
1982–1984	União Torreense	3	(0)
1984–1989	Académica de Coimbra	140	(8)
1989–1992	Nacional	28	(0)

Managerial career
- 1992–1993: Nacional
- 1994: Nacional (Assistant)
- 1999: UAE (Assistant)
- 2000–2001: Câmara Lobos
- 2003–2006: Sporting CP (Assistant)
- 2006–2007: Stade Rennais (Assistant)
- 2007–2008: Monaco (Assistant)
- 2008–2009: Al Jazira (Assistant)
- 2009–2010: Standard Liège (Assistant)
- 2010–2011: Al Wahda (Assistant)
- 2011–2012: RC Lens (Assistant)
- 2012–2015: PAOK (Assistant)
- 2016–2018: Al-Khor (Assistant)
- 2019: Figo Football Academy (Technical coordinator)
- 2020: Portimonense
- 2020–: Portimonense (Assistant)
- * Club domestic league appearances and goals

Joaquim José Correia Rolão Preto (born 5 November 1959) is a Portuguese football manager and former player.

== Biography ==
Rolão Preto was assistant coach of László Bölöni at Sporting CP between 2003 and 2006.

In February 2020, he was announced as the new assistant of Portimonense.
