= Nélson Lenho =

Portuguese footballer (born 1984)

Personal information
- Full name: Nélson Ricardo Cerqueira Rodrigues Lenho
- Date of birth: 22 March 1984 (age 42)
- Place of birth: Viana do Castelo, Portugal
- Height: 1.78 m (5 ft 10 in)
- Position: Left-back

Youth career
- 1995–1998: Vianense
- 1998–2003: Vitória Guimarães

Senior career*
| Years | Team | Apps | (Gls) |
| 2003–2006 | Sandinenses | 26 | (1) |
| 2006–2009 | Freamunde | 82 | (2) |
| 2009–2010 | Leixões | 8 | (0) |
| 2010–2012 | Santa Clara | 51 | (1) |
| 2012–2013 | Belenenses | 35 | (0) |
| 2013–2014 | Chaves | 36 | (0) |
| 2014–2015 | Penafiel | 12 | (0) |
| 2015–2017 | Chaves | 68 | (1) |
| 2017–2019 | Aves | 30 | (0) |
| 2019 | Académico Viseu | 12 | (1) |
| Total | | 360 | (6) |
- * Club domestic league appearances and goals

Nélson Ricardo Cerqueira Rodrigues Lenho (born 22 March 1984) is a Portuguese former professional footballer who played as a left-back.

He played 84 matches in the Primeira Liga over five seasons, representing Leixões, Penafiel, Chaves and Aves in the competition. He added 223 games and four goals in the LigaPro.

== Club career ==
Born in Viana do Castelo, Lenho started his 14-year professional career in the third division, spending one season apiece with G.D.R.C. Os Sandinenses and S.C. Freamunde and helping the latter club to promote to the Segunda Liga in 2006–07. In 2009 he signed with Leixões S.C. of the Primeira Liga, making his debut in the competition on 25 October in a 1–0 away loss against Vitória de Setúbal and appearing in just six more matches until the end of the season, which ended in relegation as last.

Lenho returned to the second tier subsequently, where he represented C.D. Santa Clara, C.F. Os Belenenses and G.D. Chaves. He joined top-flight side F.C. Penafiel ahead of 2014–15, being again scarcely used in another ill-fated campaign.

In 2015–16, Lenho was an undisputed starter for Chaves who returned to the top division after a lengthy absence, scoring his only goal on 30 September 2015 in the 1–1 home draw with S.L. Benfica B. The team captain was as important the following season as they easily avoided relegation after a tenth-place finish, being the league's only player to play every minute.

On 3 July 2017, Lenho joined C.D. Aves on a three-year contract. He appeared in 27 games in all competitions in his first year, including the final of the Taça de Portugal against Sporting CP as the club won its first-ever major trophy.

Lenho retired in May 2019 at the age of 35, following a short spell with Académico de Viseu F.C. of division two. Shortly after, he returned to Chaves as sporting director.

== Honours ==
Freamunde

- Segunda Divisão: 2006–07

Belenenses

- Segunda Liga: 2012–13

Aves

- Taça de Portugal: 2017–18
