= Leandro Pires =

Portuguese football coach and former player

Personal information
- Full name: Leandro Garcia Azevedo Pires
- Date of birth: 16 June 1979 (age 47)
- Place of birth: Caminha, Portugal
- Height: 1.78 m (5 ft 10 in)
- Position: Right-back

Team information
- Current team: Santa Clara (assistant manager)

Youth career
- 1994–1995: AC Caminha
- 1995–1997: Âncora-Praia FC

Senior career*
Years	Team	Apps	(Gls)
1997−1998	Âncora-Praia FC		
1998−1999	Cerveira		
1999−2001	Os Limianos		
2001−2003	Vianense	34	(4)
2003−2004	Vilaverdense		
2004−2005	Desportivo de Monção		
2005−2015	Aves	223	(3)
2015−2016	Vianense	7	(0)

Managerial career
- 2016–2017: Vianense
- 2018: Cerveira
- 2018–2020: Desportivo Aves (U23)
- 2019: Desportivo Aves (caretaker)
- 2021–2022: Tirsense
- 2022–2023: Alverca
- 2026–: Estoril (caretaker)
- * Club domestic league appearances and goals

Leandro Garcia Azevedo Pires (born 16 June 1979) is a Portuguese football coach and a former player. He is current caretaker manager at Estoril.

== Career ==
Born in Caminha, Leandro, started is youth career at his hometown club, AC Caminha in 1994. A year later, he moved to rivals Âncora-Praia FC. He debuted as a professional in the fourth tier in 1997, he then passed through five other clubs, before arriving at C.D. Aves in 2005, at age 26.

On 21 August 2005, Leandro made his professional debut with DEsportivo de Aves in a 2004–05 Liga de Honra match against Leixões. In the following ten seasons, Leandro has made over 200 league appearances for Desportivo de Aves, ultimately being named team captain. He left Aves after ten seasons and subsequently joined Vianense, assuming the team managerial role on 23 December 2015.

On 21 October 2019 he was appointed caretaker manager of Primeira Liga club Aves following the dismissal of Augusto Inácio.

In the summer of 2023, Pires was hired as an assistant coach by Santa Clara.
