= Nuno Manta Santos =

Portuguese footballer and manager

Personal information
- Full name: Nuno Miguel Manta Ribeiro Santos
- Date of birth: 25 July 1978 (age 48)
- Place of birth: Santa Maria da Feira, Portugal
- Position: Midfielder

Youth career
- 1993–1996: Sanfins

Senior career*
Years	Team	Apps	(Gls)
1996–2007	Amigos Cavaco		

Managerial career
- 2010–2013: Feirense (assistant/youth)
- 2012: Feirense (caretaker)
- 2015–2016: Feirense (youth)
- 2016–2019: Feirense
- 2019: Marítimo
- 2019–2020: Aves
- 2021–2022: Torreense
- * Club domestic league appearances and goals

Nuno Miguel Manta Ribeiro Santos, known as Nuno Manta or Nuno Manta Santos (born 25 July 1978) is a Portuguese football manager and a former player.

== Playing career ==
Born in Santa Maria da Feira, he was known as Melão in his playing career as a midfielder. He represented G.C.D. Sanfins as a youth, and hometown club Juventude Atlética “os Amigos do Cavaco” as a senior, never any higher than the second regional level.

== Managerial career ==
Manta worked in the ranks of his hometown's primary team C.D. Feirense, and he was the caretaker manager for one Segunda Liga game on 30 September 2012. He was assistant to José Mota at the now Primeira Liga club, before taking the reins when the latter was sacked in December 2016.

Feirense's fortunes improved under Manta, finishing in the top half in 8th place, and in his second season they just avoided relegation in 16th. On 4 February 2019, he was dismissed from Feirense with the club in last place after a 2–0 loss at Boavista FC, in a season that ended with relegation.

On 4 June 2019, Manta returned to the top flight, succeeding Petit at C.S. Marítimo. In his first game on 11 August, his team held Sporting CP to a 1–1 draw in Madeira. He resigned three months later, with the team in 14th and a record of three wins in 15 competitive games.

Two days after leaving Marítimo, Manta was back in the top flight with bottom-placed C.D. Aves, on a deal until 2021. His team were relegated at the end of June 2020, with five games left to play; he was internally disciplined for using profanity to publicly describe the situation at the cash-strapped club. He and his entire coaching staff resigned in August.

In November 2021 he became the new coach of Sport Clube União Torreense, and at the same time achieved the club's unprecedented rise to the Portuguese second tier.

== Honours ==
Individual

- Primeira Liga Manager of the Month: August 2018
