= Petit (Portuguese footballer) =

Portuguese football manager and former player (born 1976)

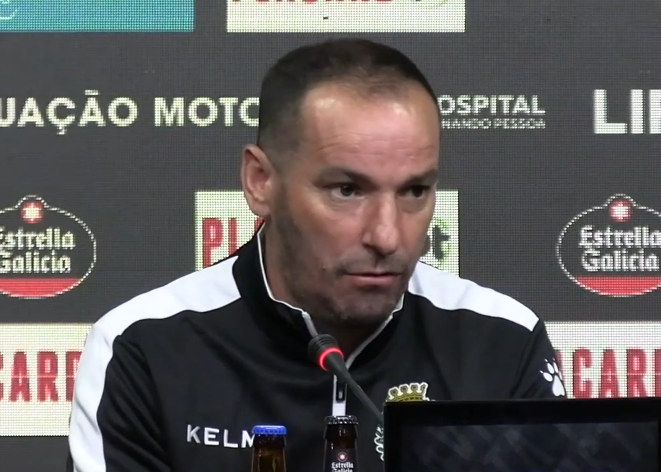
- Petit with Boavista in 2023

Personal information
- Full name: Armando Gonçalves Teixeira
- Date of birth: 25 September 1976 (age 50)
- Place of birth: Strasbourg, France
- Height: 1.76 m (5 ft 9 in)
- Position: Defensive midfielder

Team information
- Current team: Santa Clara (manager)

Youth career
- 1986–1987: Bom Pastor
- 1987–1995: Boavista

Senior career*
Years	Team	Apps	(Gls)
1995–1996	Esposende	26	(1)
1996–1997	Gondomar	13	(2)
1997–1998	União Lamas	31	(3)
1998–1999	Esposende	30	(3)
1999–2000	Gil Vicente	30	(4)
2000–2002	Boavista	51	(7)
2002–2008	Benfica	148	(12)
2008–2012	1. FC Köln	87	(5)
2012–2013	Boavista	8	(2)
Total		424	(39)

International career
2001–2008	Portugal	57	(4)

Managerial career
- 2012–2015: Boavista
- 2015–2017: Tondela
- 2017: Moreirense
- 2017–2018: Paços Ferreira
- 2018: Moreirense
- 2018–2019: Marítimo
- 2020–2021: B-SAD
- 2021–2023: Boavista
- 2024: Cuiabá
- 2024–2025: Rio Ave
- 2026–: Santa Clara
Medal record
Men's football
Representing Portugal
UEFA European Championship
Runner-up	2004 Portugal
UEFA European Under-17 Championship
Winner	1996 Austria
- * Club domestic league appearances and goals

Armando Gonçalves Teixeira OIH (Portuguese pronunciation: [ɐɾˈmɐ̃du ɣõˈsalvɨʃ tɐjˈʃɐjɾɐ]; born 25 September 1976), known as Petit, is a Portuguese former professional footballer who played as a defensive midfielder. He is the manager of Primeira Liga club Santa Clara.

He received the moniker Petit because of his small frame, and also because he was born in France. He also became known as Pitbull by supporters because of his fierce approach, in addition to a powerful outside shot.

After helping Boavista win their first and only Primeira Liga championship, he went on to amass more than 200 official appearances for Benfica, winning another three major titles. He also spent several seasons in Germany with 1. FC Köln, but his later years were marred by injury problems.

A Portugal international during the 2000s, Petit represented the nation in two World Cups – finishing fourth in the 2006 edition – and as many European Championships. He started working as a manager in 2012, with Boavista, and led six other top-flight teams.

== Club career ==
=== Early years and Boavista ===
Petit was born to Portuguese parents in Strasbourg, France, and moved to his parents' motherland at the age of two, settling in the Bom Pastor area of Paranhos in Porto. After four years with modest clubs, he first established himself at the Primeira Liga with Gil Vicente where he was a key player, helping the Barcelos team to their best-ever first division finish (fifth, narrowly missing out on qualification for the UEFA Cup).

Petit left for Boavista after one season, being instrumental in the side's only league conquest and going on to have his first experience in the UEFA Champions League. He made his debut in the latter competition on 11 September 2001, playing the full 90 minutes in a 1–1 group stage away draw against Liverpool.

=== Benfica ===
In July 2002, Petit moved to Benfica on a five-year deal for €3 million, with Boavista retaining half of his economic rights. He became an instant first choice, and in his third year, he scored twice in 29 games as the club ended an 11-year drought and won the national championship.

In June 2005, immediately after winning the league, Petit extended his contract until 2010. He scored his only European goals in 2006–07 as the team reached the quarter finals of the UEFA Cup; the goals came in wins at the Estádio da Luz over Austria Wien (Champions League third qualifying round) and Paris Saint-Germain (quarter-final second leg).

=== FC Köln ===
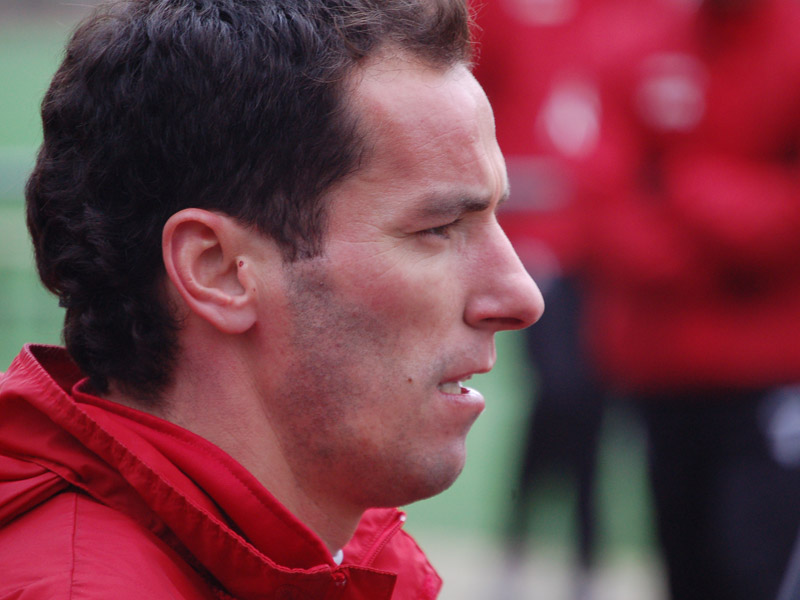
Petit with FC Köln in 2009

On 30 July 2008, Petit signed a two-year contract with newly-promoted 1. FC Köln from Germany, with the option of a third; Benfica retained first choice were he to return to his homeland, and would receive €3 million if he chose another Portuguese team. He netted his first goal with his new club on 7 August, against SV Niederauerbach in the first round of the DFB-Pokal. On 1 November, he scored his first in the Bundesliga, a 90th-minute effort against VfB Stuttgart in a 3–1 victory, ending his debut season with 31 matches out of 34 as the team easily retained their status.

The 35-year-old Petit missed the entire 2011–12 due to an anterior cruciate ligament injury, and Köln were also relegated. In August 2012, he returned to Boavista, with the club now in the third division.

== International career ==
Petit made his debut for Portugal on 2 June 2001, in a 1–1 draw against Republic of Ireland in Dublin for the 2002 FIFA World Cup qualifiers. He played for the nation in the finals, and was also a member of the team that reached the final at UEFA Euro 2004, held on home soil.

Petit scored from two long free kicks in a 7–1 home drubbing of Russia in the 2006 World Cup qualifying campaign, going on to be selected for the final stages in Germany where he netted an own goal in the 61st minute of the third place playoff against the hosts, becoming the fourth player in the tournament to score in that fashion.

Prior to the start of Euro 2008, Petit announced that he would retire from international football at 31. In total, he won 57 caps and scored four goals.

== Coaching career ==
=== Boavista ===
In October 2012, Petit was appointed player-coach of Boavista, becoming the full-time manager in the following season. The club returned to the top flight for administrative reasons in 2014, and on his professional managerial debut he lost 1–0 at home to Benfica on 24 August.

On 28 November 2015, Petit left the hotseat at the Estádio do Bessa for personal motives.

=== Tondela ===
Eleven days after leaving Boavista, Petit was appointed at Tondela for their first top-division campaign. He was the last of three coaches in charge, as the team avoided relegation in the last matchday.

Subsequently, Petit signed a new deal to last until 2018, but left on 8 January 2017 after a 1–2 home loss to Arouca.

=== Four appointments in two years ===
In March 2017, Petit was hired at Moreirense with the goal of keeping them in the main division, and left two months later by mutual consent when that was achieved. On 23 October, Paços de Ferreira hired him in an attempt to preserve their place in the top tier, and he left by his own accord the following January.

Petit returned to Moreirense in February 2018 as their third manager of the season, and left again after keeping them up. He was appointed manager of Marítimo on 27 November, on a contract lasting until the end of the campaign. He left the Madeiran club at its conclusion, as it did not exercise the option of another year.

=== B-SAD ===
On 15 January 2020, Petit was hired by his sixth Portuguese top-division side, becoming the third coach of B-SAD's campaign as they were one point above the relegation zone. He reached the quarter-finals of the Taça de Portugal in his one complete season, being eliminated 3–0 at Benfica. On 19 October 2021, having needed a goal in the last minute of extra time to defeat minnows Berço in the cup, he resigned with eight months of his contract remaining; the team had earned four points and no wins in the first eight games of the league campaign.

=== Return to Boavista ===
Petit returned to Boavista on 2 December 2021, on a deal until 2023. Two weeks later, he took the club to the Taça da Liga semi-finals for the first time following a 5–1 home rout of Braga; on 5 February, his contract was extended for another year.

At the end of a 1–1 home draw with Marítimo on 9 October 2022, Petit was sent off for insults towards the refereeing team and fined €1,632. He was suspended for the following game, a 1–0 loss in the third round of the cup away to fourth-tier Machico.

Petit resigned on 11 December 2023, following a 3–1 league loss at Estrela da Amadora that was his side's fifth in a row; it was accepted the following day.

=== Cuiabá ===
On 1 May 2024, Petit took over as coach of Campeonato Brasileiro Série A club Cuiabá. On 27 August, following a 5–0 loss to Palmeiras as part of an eight-match winless run, he resigned.

=== Rio Ave ===
Petit became manager of Rio Ave on 6 November 2024, agreeing to a short-term contract that could be renewed until June 2026. The following 17 May, however, having finished 11th in the league on 38 points and reached the semi-finals of the domestic cup, he was told he would not be retained.

=== Santa Clara ===
On 3 February 2026, Petit replaced Vasco Matos at the helm of Santa Clara, placed 16th in the top division.

== Career statistics ==
=== Club ===
Appearances and goals by club, season and competition
Club	Season	League			National cup		League cup		Continental		Total	
Club	Season	Division	Apps	Goals	Apps	Goals	Apps	Goals	Apps	Goals	Apps	Goals
Esposende	1995–96	Segunda Divisão	26	1	0	0	—		—		26	1
Gondomar	1996–97	Segunda Divisão	13	2	0	0	—		—		13	2
União Lamas	1997–98	Segunda Liga	31	3	2	0	—		—		33	3
Esposende	1998–99	Segunda Liga	30	3	4	1	—		—		34	4
Gil Vicente	1999–2000	Primeira Liga	30	4	2	0	—		—		32	4
Boavista	2000–01	Primeira Liga	26	3	4	0	—		3	0	33	3
Boavista	2001–02	Primeira Liga	25	4	2	1	—		9	0	36	5
Boavista	Total		51	7	6	1	0	0	12	0	69	8
Benfica	2002–03	Primeira Liga	25	2	1	0	—		—		26	2
Benfica	2003–04	Primeira Liga	23	0	3	0	—		9	0	35	0
Benfica	2004–05	Primeira Liga	29	2	5	0	—		8	0	42	2
Benfica	2005–06	Primeira Liga	30	3	2	0	—		9	0	41	3
Benfica	2006–07	Primeira Liga	24	4	2	0	—		14	2	40	6
Benfica	2007–08	Primeira Liga	17	1	0	0	0	0	7	0	24	1
Benfica	Total		148	12	13	0	0	0	47	2	208	14
1. FC Köln	2008–09	Bundesliga	31	3	2	1	—		—		33	4
1. FC Köln	2009–10	Bundesliga	32	1	4	0	—		—		36	1
1. FC Köln	2010–11	Bundesliga	24	1	0	0	—		—		24	1
1. FC Köln	2011–12	Bundesliga	0	0	0	0	—		—		0	0
1. FC Köln	Total		87	5	6	1	0	0	0	0	93	6
Career total			416	37	33	3	0	0	59	2	508	42

=== International ===
Appearances and goals by national team and year
National team	Year	Apps	Goals
Portugal	2001	7	0
Portugal	2002	9	0
Portugal	2003	0	0
Portugal	2004	10	2
Portugal	2005	7	1
Portugal	2006	12	1
Portugal	2007	7	0
Portugal	2008	5	0
Total		57	4

Scores and results list Portugal's goal tally first, score column indicates score after each Petit goal.

List of international goals scored by Petit
No.	Date	Venue	Opponent	Score	Result	Competition
1	13 October 2004	Estádio José Alvalade, Lisbon, Portugal	Russia	6–1	7–1	2006 FIFA World Cup qualification
2	13 October 2004	Estádio José Alvalade, Lisbon, Portugal	Russia	7–1	7–1	2006 FIFA World Cup qualification
3	12 November 2005	Estádio Cidade de Coimbra, Coimbra, Portugal	Croatia	1–0	2–0	Friendly
4	27 May 2006	Complexo Desportivo, Évora, Portugal	Cape Verde	3–1	4–1	Friendly

== Managerial statistics ==
As of match played 8 November 2026

Managerial record by team and tenure
Team	Nat	From	To	Record							
Team	Nat	From	To	G	W	D	L	GF	GA	GD	Win %
Boavista	(Portugal)	8 October 2012	28 November 2015	115	45	27	43	149	140	+9	39.13
Tondela	(Portugal)	9 December 2015	9 January 2017	42	11	8	23	49	70	−21	26.19
Moreirense	(Portugal)	20 March 2017	26 May 2017	8	3	3	2	9	8	+1	37.50
Paços de Ferreira	(Portugal)	23 October 2017	8 January 2018	9	1	2	6	11	20	−9	11.11
Moreirense	(Portugal)	14 February 2018	20 May 2018	12	4	1	7	11	17	−6	33.33
Marítimo	(Portugal)	27 November 2018	4 June 2019	25	9	2	14	20	32	−12	36.00
B-SAD	(Portugal)	15 January 2020	19 October 2021	66	18	22	26	55	78	−23	27.27
Boavista	(Portugal)	30 November 2021	11 December 2023	79	25	27	27	103	121	−18	31.65
Cuiabá	(Brazil)	1 May 2024	27 August 2024	24	7	8	9	30	30	+0	29.17
Rio Ave	(Portugal)	6 November 2024	17 May 2025	29	9	9	11	39	43	−4	31.03
Santa Clara	(Portugal)	3 February 2026	Present	26	11	7	8	34	27	+7	42.31
Total				435	143	116	176	510	586	−76	32.87

== Honours ==
=== Player ===
Boavista

- Primeira Liga: 2000–01

Benfica

- Primeira Liga: 2004–05
- Taça de Portugal: 2003–04
- Supertaça Cândido de Oliveira: 2005

Portugal

- UEFA European Championship runner-up: 2004

Individual

- Portuguese Footballer of the Year: 2001
- Portuguese Golden Ball: 2006

=== Manager ===
Boavista

- Primeira Liga Manager of the Month: August 2023

=== Orders ===
- Medal of Merit, Order of the Immaculate Conception of Vila Viçosa (House of Braganza)
