= Idrissa Mandiang =

Senegalese footballer

Personal information
- Full name: Idrissa Mandiang Soumaré
- Date of birth: 27 December 1984 (age 41)
- Place of birth: Dakar, Senegal
- Height: 1.89 m (6 ft 2 in)
- Position: Defensive midfielder

Senior career*
Years	Team	Apps	(Gls)
2005–2008	Bellavista Milan		
2008–2009	Granollers	13	(2)
2009	Águeda	10	(1)
2009–2011	Sertanense	30	(2)
2011–2012	Covilhã	17	(1)
2012–2013	Arouca	29	(1)
2013–2014	Moreirense	23	(1)
2014–2020	Boavista	139	(6)
2020–2021	Covilhã	2	(0)
2021	Lusitânia	11	(0)
2022	Vevey United	13	(3)
2023	Palencia	11	(2)
2023	Montreux-Sports		
2023–2024	Lancy	23	(1)
- * Club domestic league appearances and goals as of 20:14, 2 July 2024 (UTC)

Idrissa Mandiang Soumaré (born 27 December 1984), commonly known as Idris, is a Senegalese professional footballer who most recently played as a defensive midfielder for Swiss 2. Liga Interregional club Lancy.

== Career ==
Born in Dakar, Senegal, Mandiang began his professional football career considerably late at the age of 20 for lower league Spanish side Bellavista Milan in 2005. In the summer of 2008, he moved on to another Spanish side in Granollers. After half a season with the Spanish side, Mandiang moved west to Portugal to represent Águeda of the Terceira Divisão. Following half a season with Águeda, Mandiang would move again and would sign for Portuguese Second Division side Sertanense. His stay with the Sertã club proved to be successful as in his first season he helped his side avoid relegation and then in the following season help Sertanense finish in fifth place.

His successful spell with Sertanense saw many clubs interested in his acquisition, which prompted Segunda Liga side Covilhã to sign the player. His debut season in the second professional tier of Portuguese football saw him make 17 appearances and contributing one goal. His first professional goal came on 18 December 2011, against Penafiel in a 1–0 victory for his side. In the summer of 2012, Mandiang moved to Arouca. His season at Arouca proved to be his most successful so far, as he managed to make 35 appearances and help his side reach the quarter-finals of the Taça de Portugal for the first time in their history and claim an historic first promotion to the Primeira Liga.

Despite Arouca's promotion to the top flight, Mandiang in the summer of 2013 signed for recently relegated to the second division side Moreirense He scored one goal in 23 league appearances with Moreirense claiming promotion to the first division. In the end of the season he moved to newly promoted Boavista. He made his debut in first division in the first day of the season, a 3–0 away. On 3 May 2015, he scored two goals against his former team Moreirense, in a 3–1 home win for Boavista, a victory that guaranteed that Boavista would stay in the first division for the next season, with three matches to play. He would go on to captain for the club before leaving in 2020.
