= 2003–04 FC Porto season =

FC Porto
2003–04 season
- Manager: José Mourinho
- Primeira Liga: 1st
- Taça de Portugal: Runners-up
- Supertaça Cândido de Oliveira: Winners
- Champions League: Winners
- UEFA Super Cup: Runners-up
- Top goalscorer: League: Benni McCarthy (20); All: Benni McCarthy (25)
Home colours	Away colours

FC Porto became the 12th club to win multiple European Cup/Champions League titles in a fairytale 2003–04 season. For the first time since 1995, a club outside the big four leagues won the trophy, and it was widely attributed to charismatic coach José Mourinho. The title was clinched in an emphatic 3–0 victory against Monaco in the final in Gelsenkirchen.

Following the success, Mourinho departed the club for Chelsea, bringing key defenders Paulo Ferreira and Ricardo Carvalho with him. Playmaker Deco also departed, in his case for Barcelona. Elsewhere, it got to keep midfield duo Maniche and Costinha intact, and strikers Derlei and Benni McCarthy stayed at the club.

== Squad ==
Squad at end of season

Note: Flags indicate national team as defined under FIFA eligibility rules; some limited exceptions apply. Players may hold more than one non-FIFA nationality.

No.	Pos.	Nation	Player
1	GK	POR	Bruno Vale
2	DF	POR	Jorge Costa
3	DF	POR	Pedro Emanuel
4	DF	POR	Ricardo Carvalho
5	DF	POR	Ricardo Costa
6	MF	POR	Costinha
7	DF	POR	Carlos Secretário
8	DF	POR	Nuno Valente
9	FW	LTU	Edgaras Jankauskas
10	MF	POR	Deco
11	FW	BRA	Derlei
13	GK	POR	Nuno
14	MF	POR	Sérgio Conceição
15	MF	RUS	Dmitri Alenichev
16	DF	POR	César Peixoto

No.	Pos.	Nation	Player
17	DF	POR	José Bosingwa
18	MF	POR	Maniche
19	MF	BRA	Carlos Alberto
20	MF	POR	Marco Ferreira
21	FW	BRA	Maciel
22	DF	POR	Paulo Ferreira
23	MF	POR	Pedro Mendes
25	MF	POR	Ricardo Fernandes
28	FW	BRA	Bruno Moraes
29	FW	POR	Hugo Almeida
30	DF	POR	Mário Silva
39	MF	POR	André Vilas Boas (on loan from Rio Ave)
77	FW	RSA	Benni McCarthy
99	GK	POR	Vítor Baía

=== Out on loan ===
Note: Flags indicate national team as defined under FIFA eligibility rules; some limited exceptions apply. Players may hold more than one non-FIFA nationality.

No.	Pos.	Nation	Player
29	FW	POR	Hugo Almeida (on loan to União de Leiria)
66	MF	POR	Tiago (on loan to União de Leiria)

No.	Pos.	Nation	Player
92	FW	BRA	Serginho Baiano (on loan to Nacional)

== Results ==
=== Supertaça Cândido de Oliveira ===
10 August 2003	Porto	1–0	União de Leiria	Guimarães
21:00 (WEST)	Costinha 53'			Stadium: Estádio D. Afonso Henriques; Referee: Pedro Proença (Lisbon)

=== UEFA Super Cup ===
29 August 2003	Milan (Italy)	1–0	(Portugal) Porto	Monaco
20:45 (CEST)	Shevchenko 10'	Report		Stadium: Stade Louis II; Attendance: 16,885; Referee: Graham Barber (England)

=== Primeira Liga ===
Pos	Team	Pld	W	D	L	GF	GA	GD	Pts	Qualification or relegation
1	Porto (C)	34	25	7	2	63	19	+44	82	Qualification to Champions League group stage
2	Benfica	34	22	8	4	62	28	+34	74	Qualification to Champions League third qualifying round
3	Sporting CP	34	23	4	7	60	33	+27	73	Qualification to UEFA Cup first round (Note: Maritimo qualified for the UEFA Cup because Benfica, the Portuguese Cup winners, qualified for the Champions League.)
4	Nacional	34	17	5	12	56	35	+21	56	Qualification to UEFA Cup first round
5	Braga	34	15	9	10	36	38	−2	54	Qualification to UEFA Cup first round

Source: Foradejogo
Rules for classification: 1) points; 2) head-to-head points; 3) head-to-head goal difference; 4) goal difference; 5) number of goals scored
(C) Champions

==== Matches ====
17 August 2003 1	Porto	2–0	Braga	Porto
	McCarthy 22'; Derlei 83'	Report		Stadium: Estádio das Antas

24 August 2003 2	Estrela Amadora	1–1	Porto	Amadora
	Júlio César 76'	Report	McCarthy 62'	Stadium: Estádio José Gomes

2 September 2003 3	Porto	4–1	Sporting CP	Porto
	Derlei 3'; Jankauskas 51'; Maniche 64'; McCarthy 89' (pen.)	Report	Rochemback 79'	Stadium: Estádio das Antas

13 September 2003 4	União de Leiria	1–3	Porto	Leiria
	Maciel 60'	Report	Derlei 30'; Fernandes 71'; M. Ferreira 74'	Stadium: Estádio Dr. Magalhães Pessoa

21 September 2003 5	Porto	2–0	Benfica	Porto
	Derlei 30'; Argel 52' (o.g.)	Report		Stadium: Estádio das Antas

27 September 2003 6	Vitória de Guimarães	1–2	Porto	Guimarães
	Romeu 5'	Report	Derlei 10'; Costinha 79'	Stadium: Estádio D. Afonso Henriques

5 October 2003 7	Porto	4–1	Académica	Porto
	Peixoto 9'; Derlei 15', 41', 49'	Report	Dário 7'	Stadium: Estádio das Antas

18 October 2003 8	Belenenses	1–4	Porto	Belém, Lisbon
	Brandão 5'	Report	Derlei 18'; Deco 33'; Peixoto 46'; M. Ferreira 53'	Stadium: Estádio do Restelo

27 October 2003 9	Boavista	0–1	Porto	Porto
		Report	Alenichev 77'	Stadium: Estádio do Bessa

31 October 2003 10	Porto	1–0	Nacional	Porto
	Carvalho 53'	Report		Stadium: Estádio das Antas

9 November 2003 11	Moreirense	1–1	Porto	Moreira de Cónegos
	Manoel 28'	Report	McCarthy 28'	Stadium: Parque de Jogos Comendador Joaquim de Almeida Freitas

30 November 2003 12	Porto	4–1	Gil Vicente	Porto
	Maniche 37'; McCarthy 59'; Alenichev 64'; Derlei 81'	Report	Edinho 66'	Stadium: Estádio das Antas

5 December 2003 13	Marítimo	2–2	Porto	Funchal
	Rincón 18', 66'	Report	Derlei 22' (pen.), 36'	Stadium: Estádio do Marítimo

14 December 2003 14	Porto	3–0	Beira-Mar	Porto
	Wijnhard 12' (o.g.); McCarthy 75'; Maniche 77'	Report		Stadium: Estádio das Antas

22 December 2003 15	Alverca	1–2	Porto	Alverca do Ribatejo
	Manú 27'	Report	Derlei 16'; Maniche 35'	Stadium: Complexo Desportivo FC Alverca

5 January 2004 16	Porto	1–0	Rio Ave	Porto
	McCarthy 90' (pen.)	Report		Stadium: Estádio das Antas

10 January 2004 17	Paços de Ferreira	0–2	Porto	Paços de Ferreira
		Report	McCarthy 16', 22'	Stadium: Estádio da Mata Real

17 January 2004 18	Braga	0–3	Porto	Braga
		Report	Maniche 14'; Maciel 21'; McCarthy 45'	Stadium: Estádio Municipal de Braga

24 January 2004 19	Porto	2–0	Estrela Amadora	Porto
	McCarthy 30', 45'	Report		Stadium: Estádio das Antas

31 January 2004 20	Sporting CP	1–1	Porto	Lisbon
	Barbosa 69' (pen.)	Report	Costa 9'	Stadium: Estádio José Alvalade

7 February 2004 21	Porto	2–1	União de Leiria	Porto
	Maniche 18'; Maciel 34'	Report	Freddy 76'	Stadium: Estádio do Dragão

15 February 2004 22	Benfica	1–1	Porto	Lisbon
	Simão 50'	Report	Costinha 29'	Stadium: Estádio da Luz

21 February 2004 23	Porto	3–0	Vitória de Guimarães	Porto
	Maciel 30'; Jankauskas 45'; McCarthy 90+4' (pen.)	Report		Stadium: Estádio do Dragão

1 March 2004 24	Académica	0–1	Porto	Coimbra
		Report	McCarthy 76'	Stadium: Estádio Cidade de Coimbra

5 March 2004 25	Porto	4–1	Belenenses	Porto
	McCarthy 45', 51' (pen.); Costa 64'; Deco 83'	Report	Brasília 89'	Stadium: Estádio do Dragão

13 March 2004 26	Porto	1–0	Boavista	Porto
	McCarthy 73'	Report		Stadium: Estádio do Dragão

28 March 2004 28	Porto	1–0	Moreirense	Porto
	Carlos Alberto 89'	Report		Stadium: Estádio do Dragão

3 April 2004 29	Gil Vicente	2–0	Porto	Barcelos
	Gaspar 63'; Luís Coentrão 66'	Report		Stadium: Estádio Adelino Ribeiro Novo

10 April 2004 30	Porto	1–0	Marítimo	Porto
	Carvalho 85'	Report		Stadium: Estádio do Dragão

13 April 2004 27	Nacional	0–0	Porto	Madeira
		Report		Stadium: Estádio da Madeira

18 April 2004 31	Beira-Mar	0–0	Porto	Aveiro
		Report		Stadium: Estádio Municipal de Aveiro

25 April 2004 32	Porto	1–0	Alverca	Porto
	Bosingwa 49'	Report		Stadium: Estádio do Dragão

30 April 2004 33	Rio Ave	1–0	Porto	Vila do Conde
	Miguelito 14'	Report		Stadium: Estádio dos Arcos

8 May 2004 34	Porto	3–1	Paços de Ferreira	Porto
	McCarthy 19', 51', 68'	Report	Queirós 15'	Stadium: Estádio do Dragão

=== Taça de Portugal ===
==== Knockout stage ====
22 November 2003 Fourth round	Porto (I)	1–0	Boavista (I)	Porto
	Derlei 53'			Stadium: Estádio das Antas; Referee: Pedro Proença

17 December 2003 Fifth round	Porto (I)	3–0	Maia (II)	Porto
21:00 (WET)	McCarthy 25'; Maniche 80'; Alenichev 90'			Stadium: Estádio das Antas; Referee: Nuno Almeida

21 January 2004 Sixth round	Porto (I)	4–0	Vilafranquense (III)	Porto
	Carlos Alberto 23', 76'; M. Ferreira 28'; Conceição 65' (pen.)			Stadium: Estádio das Antas; Referee: Paulo Perreira

11 February 2004 Quarter-finals	Rio Ave (I)	1–2	Porto (I)	Vila do Conde
	Carvalho 46' (o.g.)		Costinha 21'; Moraes 39'	Stadium: Estádio dos Arcos; Referee: Martins dos Santos

16 March 2004 Semi-finals	Braga (I)	1–3	Porto (I)	Braga
21:15 (WET)	Vanzini 55'		Jankauskas 7', 52', 62'	Stadium: Estádio 1º de Maio

==== Final ====
16 May 2004 Final	Benfica (I)	2–1 (a.e.t.)	Porto (I)	Oeiras
17:15 (WEST)	Fyssas 58'; Simão 104'		Derlei 45'	Stadium: Estádio Nacional

=== UEFA Champions League ===
==== Group stage ====
Pos	Team	Pld	W	D	L	GF	GA	GD	Pts	Qualification
1	(Spain) Real Madrid	6	4	2	0	11	5	+6	14	Advance to knockout stage
2	(Portugal) Porto	6	3	2	1	9	8	+1	11	Advance to knockout stage
3	(France) Marseille	6	1	1	4	9	11	−2	4	Transfer to UEFA Cup
4	(Serbia and Montenegro) Partizan	6	0	3	3	3	8	−5	3	

Source: RSSSF

16 September 2003 1	Partizan (Serbia and Montenegro)	1–1	(Portugal) Porto	Belgrade, Serbia and Montenegro
	Delibašić 54'		Costinha 22'	Stadium: Partizan Stadium; Referee: Michal Beneš (Czech Republic)

1 October 2003 2	Porto (Portugal)	1–3	(Spain) Real Madrid	Porto, Portugal
	Costinha 7'		Helguera 28'; Solari 37'; Zidane 67'	Stadium: Estádio das Antas; Referee: Pierluigi Collina (Italy)

22 October 2003 3	Marseille (France)	2–3	(Portugal) Porto	Marseille, France
	Drogba 24'; Marlet 84'		Maniche 31'; Derlei 35'; Alenichev 81'	Stadium: Stade Vélodrome; Referee: Kyros Vassaras (Greece)

4 November 2003 4	FC Porto (Portugal)	1–0	(France) Marseille	Porto, Portugal
	Alenichev 21'			Stadium: Estádio das Antas; Referee: Graham Poll (England)

26 November 2003 5	Porto (Portugal)	2–1	(Serbia and Montenegro) Partizan	Porto, Portugal
	McCarthy 25', 50'		Delibašić 90+2'	Stadium: Estádio das Antas; Referee: Paul Allaerts (Belgium)

9 December 2003 6	Real Madrid (Spain)	1–1	(Portugal) Porto	Madrid, Spain
	Solari 9'		Derlei 35' (pen.)	Stadium: Estadio Santiago Bernabéu; Referee: Steve Bennett (England)

==== Knockout stage ====
Round of 16

25 February 2004 First leg	Porto (Portugal)	2–1	(England) Manchester United	Porto, Portugal
	McCarthy 29', 78'		Fortune 14'	Stadium: Estádio do Dragão; Referee: Herbert Fandel (Germany)

9 March 2004 Second leg	Manchester United (England)	1–1 (2–3 agg.)	(Portugal) Porto	Manchester, England
	Scholes 32'		Costinha 90'	Stadium: Old Trafford; Referee: Valentin Ivanov (Russia)

Quarter-finals

23 March 2004 First leg	Porto (Portugal)	2–0	(France) Lyon	Porto, Portugal
	Deco 44'; Carvalho 71'			Stadium: Estádio do Dragão; Referee: Terje Hauge (Norway)

7 April 2004 Second leg	Lyon (France)	2–2 (2–4 agg.)	(Portugal) Porto	Lyon, France
	Luyindula 14'; Élber 90'		Maniche 6', 47'	Stadium: Stade de Gerland; Referee: Anders Frisk (Sweden)

Semi-finals

21 April 2004 First leg	Porto (Portugal)	0–0	(Spain) Deportivo La Coruña	Porto, Portugal
19:45 (WEST)		Report		Stadium: Estádio do Dragão; Referee: Markus Merk (Germany)

4 May 2004 Second leg	Deportivo La Coruña (Spain)	0–1 (0–1 agg.)	(Portugal) Porto	A Coruña, Spain
20:45 CEST		Report	Derlei 60' (pen.)	Stadium: Estadio Riazor; Attendance: 34,600; Referee: Pierluigi Collina (Italy)

==== Final ====
26 May 2004	Monaco (France)	0–3	(Portugal) Porto	Gelsenkirchen, Germany
			Carlos Alberto 39'; Deco 71'; Alenichev 75'	Stadium: Arena AufSchalke; Attendance: 52,000; Referee: Kim Milton Nielsen (Denmark)

== Top scorers ==
=== Primeira Liga ===
- (South Africa) Benni McCarthy 20
- (Brazil) Derlei 13
- (Portugal) Maniche 6
