= Ricardo Carvalho =

Portuguese football manager and former player

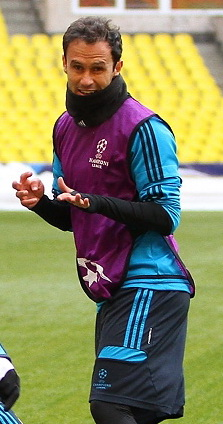
- Carvalho with Real Madrid in 2012

Personal information
- Full name: Ricardo Alberto Silveira de Carvalho
- Date of birth: 18 May 1978 (age 48)
- Place of birth: Amarante, Portugal
- Height: 1.83 m (6 ft 0 in)
- Position: Centre-back

Team information
- Current team: Portugal (assistant head coach)

Youth career
- 1989–1995: Amarante
- 1995–1997: Porto

Senior career*
Years	Team	Apps	(Gls)
1997–2004	Porto	73	(3)
1998–1999	→ Leça (loan)	22	(1)
1999–2000	→ Vitória Setúbal (loan)	25	(2)
2000–2001	→ Alverca (loan)	29	(1)
2004–2010	Chelsea	135	(7)
2010–2013	Real Madrid	50	(3)
2013–2016	Monaco	95	(2)
2017	Shanghai SIPG	4	(0)
Total		433	(19)

International career
1998–1999	Portugal U21	14	(1)
2003–2016	Portugal	89	(5)

Managerial career
- 2019–2021: Marseille (assistant)
- 2023–: Portugal (assistant)
Medal record
Men's football
Representing Portugal
UEFA European Championship
Winner	2016 France
Runner-up	2004 Portugal
- * Club domestic league appearances and goals

Ricardo Alberto Silveira de Carvalho OIH ComM (Portuguese pronunciation: [ʁiˈkaɾðu kɐɾˈvaʎu]; born 18 May 1978) is a Portuguese football coach and former player who is assistant head coach of the Portugal national team. He is widely regarded as one of the best centre-backs of his generation.

Carvalho began his career at Porto, where he had loan spells at Leça, Vitória de Setúbal and Alverca, before winning domestic and European trophies under José Mourinho's management. In July 2004, Carvalho transferred to Chelsea for a fee of just under €30 million. With the Blues, he won two Premier League titles in a row and one League Cup, in his first two seasons. In 2008, he was voted the team's Players' Player of the Year. Two years later, he helped Chelsea win the league and FA Cup, the first Double in the club's history. In August 2010, after six years with Chelsea, he transferred to Real Madrid for a fee of £6.7 million, winning two domestic honours under Mourinho's management before a free transfer to Monaco in 2013.

In international football, Carvalho's national team career began on 11 October 2003 in a friendly match against Albania. He represented Portugal in three UEFA European Championships and two FIFA World Cups, and was a member of the team that won UEFA Euro 2016. He was a regular in Portugal's lineup during Euro 2004, when his country advanced all the way to the final before losing to Greece. At the 2006 World Cup, he played in six matches for Portugal, who finished fourth after reaching the semi-finals.

== Club career ==
=== Porto (1997–2004) ===
Ricardo Carvalho was brought to the Porto junior team in the 1996–97 season. In the oncoming season, Carvalho made his professional debut when he signed on loan for Leça. Between 1999 and 2001, he had loan spells at Vitória de Setúbal and Alverca. He returned to Porto in the 2001–02 season, being third choice behind Jorge Costa and Jorge Andrade, but he quickly won a place in the starting XI, forming a terrific partnership with Andrade in the centre of defence, which brought disappointment to captain Jorge Costa who, in April 2002, joined Charlton Athletic on a five-month loan spell. Carvalho made 25 appearances in the Portuguese league that season. In the following season, Jorge Costa returned to Porto and Jorge Andrade moved to Deportivo de La Coruña in Spain. With José Mourinho in charge, Carvalho started the campaign as the third option behind Costa and Pedro Emanuel, but later, his excellent form led him to a place in the first team, appearing in the most important games of the season, including the UEFA cup semi-finals matches against Lazio and the UEFA Cup final where Porto beat Celtic 3–2 in extra time. It was Carvalho's first international trophy. By his great season, he was named Portuguese League Footballer of the Year and Porto Footballer of the Year.

It was in the 2003–04 season that Carvalho made his name as a world-class footballer. His solid performances helped the club win the Portuguese league title for the second year in a row, and the most prestigious club trophy in European football, the UEFA Champions League. In this tournament, Carvalho played in all of Porto's matches, including the 3–0 win against Monaco in the final. Subsequently, his great performances merited the UEFA Club Best Defender of the Year award, voted into the UEFA Team of the Year, and was named one of the 50 players shortlisted for the 2004 Ballon d'Or), finishing ninth in the voting, being the only defender in top ten. He was selected for the Portuguese UEFA Euro 2004 squad, in which tournament he was also nominated for the UEFA Euro Team of the Tournament. At the end of the season, Carvalho has been tracked by a host of top European clubs, including Internazionale, Barcelona, Real Madrid and Manchester United. Real Madrid offered €8.2 (£7) million for Carvalho, but Porto warned the Spaniards they would not accept anything less than €23.5 (£20) million for the defender after the Spanish team made a much lower offer. Days later, English club Chelsea offered €30 (£25.5) million for the centre back, which the Portuguese team accepted.

=== Chelsea (2004–2010) ===
At Stamford Bridge, Carvalho, who was considered one of the best centre-backs at Euro 2004, joined his former manager José Mourinho and former teammate Paulo Ferreira on a three-year contract. He signed for a fee of €30 million (£20 million at the time) and performed extremely well in his first season with Chelsea, helping them win the Premier League title, their first top-flight domestic title in 50 years, and the League Cup. He scored his first goal for Chelsea in a 3–1 victory over Norwich City. His partnership with captain John Terry in central defence was hailed as a major factor behind Chelsea's two Premier League titles in a row.

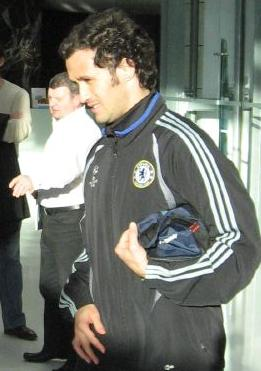
Ricardo Carvalho on tour with Chelsea in 2007.

The start of 2005–06 season was not as smooth for him, as he was publicly lambasted by Mourinho after making comments about his selection policy. Carvalho said the Chelsea manager's decision to drop him for the first game of the season was "incomprehensible", but Mourinho responded, "Carvalho seems to have problems understanding things, maybe he should have an IQ test," and then left him out for next game, against Arsenal, and fined him a reported £85,000. He later returned to favour, though, and was a near-regular in the side from September. On 19 October 2005, he scored his first goal of the season in a 4–0 home win against Real Betis in the UEFA Champions League group stage. Carvalho continued his scoring run in Europe by netting his second goal of the season in Chelsea's 2–0 away victory over Anderlecht on 23 November. In January, in a 1–1 Premier League draw against Charlton Athletic, Carvalho received the first red card of his Chelsea career, after he received his second yellow for what the referee judged to be a tackle from behind on Charlton striker Darren Bent. Later, on 29 April 2006, he scored again a goal, his third of the season, in a 3–0 Premier League victory over Manchester United, finishing off a move he had started on the edge of his own penalty area by smashing the ball into the net, to help Chelsea clinch the title for the second consecutive year.

In the 2006–07 season, Carvalho scored again against Manchester United an important goal in a 1–1 draw – a header from a Frank Lampard corner that also bounced off Louis Saha's head. On 7 April, he scored another goal against Tottenham Hotspur, firing a low, 30-yard drive past the reach of Spurs goalkeeper Paul Robinson; as a result Chelsea narrowed the gap on Premier League leaders Manchester United to three points. Just 21 days later, on 28 April, Carvalho injured the medial ligaments of his right leg in a Premier League match against Bolton Wanderers. The injury meant Carvalho missed the second leg of the Champions League semi-final against Liverpool. He also missed the FA Cup final against Manchester United, which Chelsea won after a goal from Didier Drogba during extra time. On 18 May 2007, the day of his 29th birthday, Carvalho signed a five-year contract extension with Chelsea, keeping him at the club through the 2011–12 season. For his great performances during the 2006–07 season, Carvalho has been recognized by a number of organisations. Sky Sports listed him as one of seven candidates for the Premiership's "Defender of the Year". He was also one of three Chelsea players nominated for the club's "Player of the Year" honour, which was ultimately won by Michael Essien.

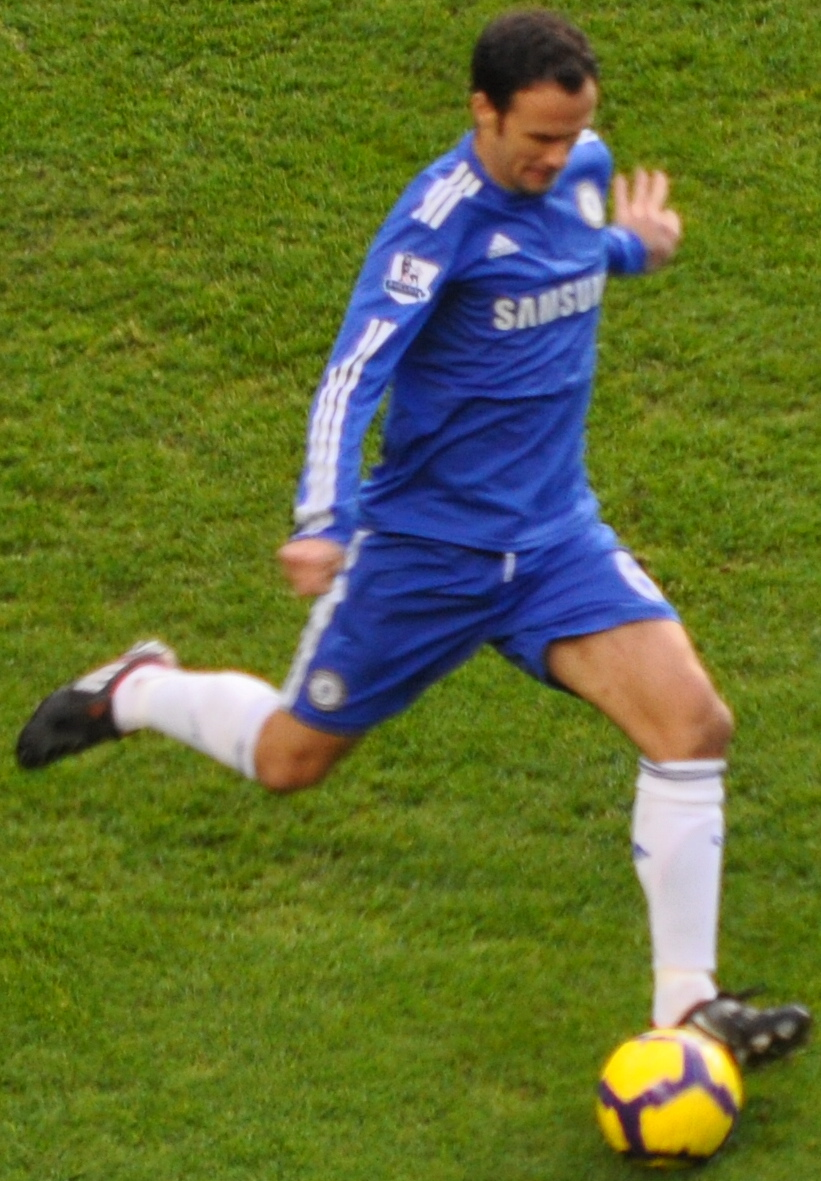
Ricardo Carvalho in a Premier League game against Fulham on 28 December 2009.

Carvalho continued his excellent form into the 2007–08 season. Following the departure of manager José Mourinho, the Spanish champions, Real Madrid, have once again expressed their interest in Carvalho. A Madrid source said, "We have never been able to get Carvalho because of his connection with Mourinho. Now he has left Chelsea, we feel there's a real chance." But the Portuguese did not leave the English club. On 26 December 2007, in a 4–4 home draw against Aston Villa, on the 79th minute, the home side were outmanoeuvred in the middle of the field leaving only goalkeeper Petr Čech and Carvalho between Villa's striker, Gabriel Agbonlahor, and the goal, Carvalho attempted the block, went in two-footed and was red carded for the foul, in the same night, he issued a public apology for his horror tackle on the forward. In that season, Carvalho was one of the most consistent performers at the club and his efforts were rewarded when he scored his first goal of the season in his 150th appearance for the club, a 1–0 Premier League victory over Middlesbrough. Later, on 26 April, Carvalho made his 100th appearance in the Premier League against Manchester United, despite Chelsea's 2–1 win, he marred his centenary mark with an error that allowed Wayne Rooney to equalise. His solid performances in the Champions League helped the club reach the final, Chelsea's first ever Champions League final appearance and Carvalho's second. The Blues, however, lost 6–5 on penalties against Manchester United after a 1–1 draw following extra time. Carvalho played in all 120 minutes and he was booked one time for a high challenge on Cristiano Ronaldo right before the end of first half. On 8 May 2008, Carvalho was voted by his fellow Chelsea colleagues as Chelsea's "Players Player of the Year", while finishing in the top three for Chelsea's "Player of the Year" award voted by Chelsea fans, along with Michael Ballack and Joe Cole.

Carvalho opened his account for the 2008–09 season against Manchester City in a 1–3 away victory, on 13 September 2008. He was a somewhat peripheral figure for the rest of the season, as injury, the sacking of Luiz Felipe Scolari, and subsequent appointment of Guus Hiddink meant that he lost his place in the team to Brazilian teammate Alex. He clocked up only 18 appearances in all competitions, two as substitute, scoring one goal.

In July 2009, Carvalho told Chelsea he wanted to quit the club to join Internazionale. He said, "I have had four extraordinary years at Chelsea until this year, which has not been very good - indeed it was the worst of my career." He played only 18 times in that season at Chelsea. But a move to Inter to link up with Mourinho collapsed when the Italian club wanted to sign him as a free transfer.

The appointment of Carlo Ancelotti, coupled with recovery from injury, saw Carvalho regain his place in the Chelsea team. He made a fine start to the 2009–10 season, scoring a diving header in the 2009 FA Community Shield match against Manchester United, a game in which he also received the Man of the Match award. Chelsea got off to a terrible start conceding inside 10 minutes, but second-half goals from Carvalho and Frank Lampard looked enough to pull the team back from behind to win the trophy, only for Wayne Rooney to clip home an equaliser in stoppage time, forcing penalties. Chelsea went on to win the match 4–1 on penalties, following a 2–2 draw at the end of normal time. On 20 December 2009, Carvalho made his 200th appearance in a 1–1 draw against West Ham United in the Premier League, where the defender was booked just before the half-hour mark for a challenge on Guillermo Franco, before West Ham had their best chance of the opening stages. On 24 March, in a 5–0 win over Portsmouth, Carvalho suffered ankle ligament damage; it seemed serious but it was not necessary a corrective surgery on this injury, leaving the team with just two first-choice central defenders in Alex and captain John Terry, and scaring the Portugal national team head coach, Carlos Queiroz, with the risk of not being able to go to 2010 FIFA World Cup. Due to the injury, Carvalho missed all the following league matches, including the title match victory against Wigan Athletic. It was Carvalho's third Premier League title with the Blues. Six days later, on 15 May, he missed another important match, the 2010 FA Cup final, which they won after a single goal from Didier Drogba. By winning the title, Chelsea secured the first ever Double in the club's history. At the end of the season, on 24 July, The Sun carried reports that Carvalho had expressed his desire to leave Chelsea and link up with former manager José Mourinho, who was now in charge at Real Madrid in Spain.

=== Real Madrid (2010–2013) ===
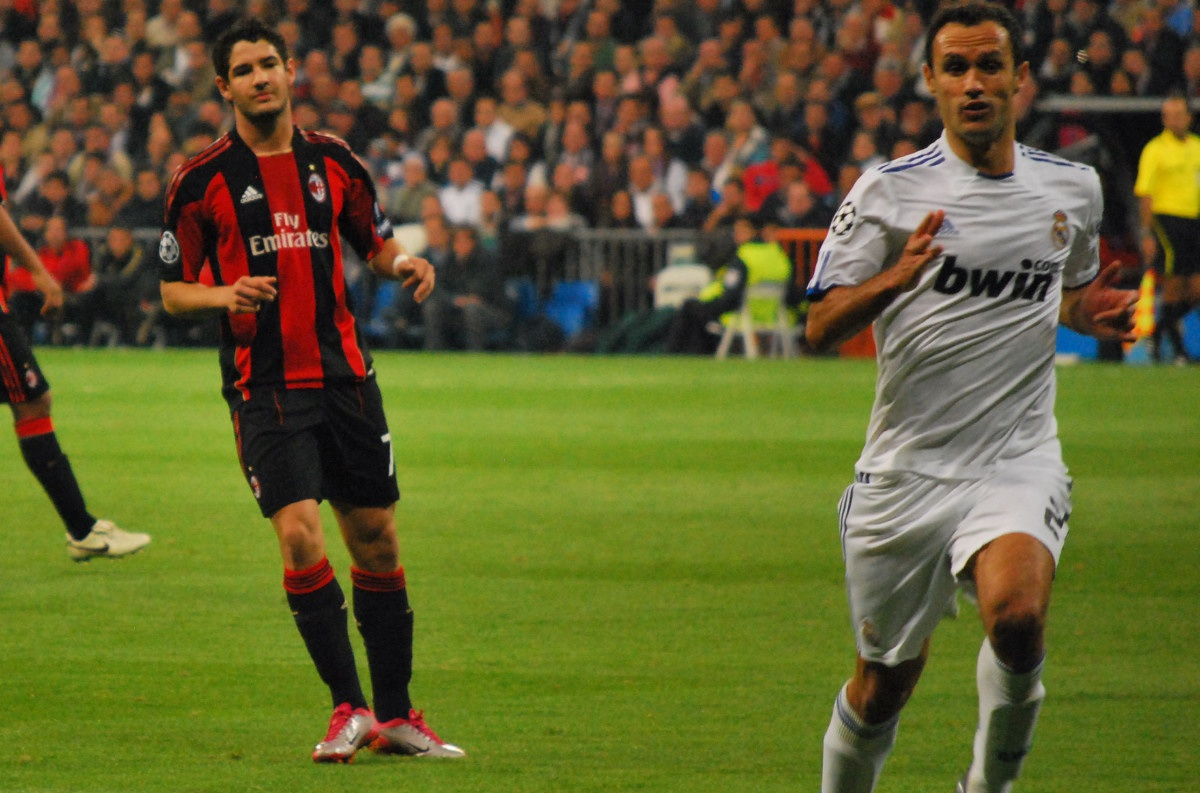
Carvalho and Alexandre Pato of Milan in a Champions League match in October 2010

On 10 August 2010, Real Madrid signed Carvalho for a reported fee of €7.9 (£6.7) million on a two-year contract. He made his debut on 13 August 2010 in a friendly match against Bayern Munich, which Real Madrid won 4–2 on penalties after a 0–0 draw. His La Liga debut came on 29 August, in a 0–0 draw against Mallorca, and, in the following match, against Osasuna, he scored his first Liga goal; Mesut Özil raced to the penalty area and managed to thread a low cross for Cristiano Ronaldo, whose first time shot was blocked by the Osasuna's goalkeeper Ricardo, but the Portuguese managed to tip-toe the rebound for Carvalho to score the go-ahead goal, giving his team a 1–0 home victory. On 19 October 2010, in a UEFA Champions League victory against Milan, Carvalho was named the Man of the match by the Spanish newspaper Marca. Some weeks later, on 7 November, Carvalho proved again to be in good shape in a 2–0 derby victory against Atlético Madrid, where he scored his second goal in La Liga, being named again the man of the match. Next month on day 19, in a 1–0 home victory against Sevilla, Carvalho received his first red card for the club; having already been booked in the first half, he was shown a second yellow following an aerial challenge with Sevilla's Álvaro Negredo in the second half. On 19 February 2011, he scored his third and last season goal against Levante in another 2–0 league victory. Carvalho made 48 appearances in all competitions that season, bringing calmness and solidness to the defence, and was a heavy reason why Real Madrid had the best defense in Champions League, only letting five goals get past their goalkeeper.

Carvalho started the 2011–12 season well and remained as first-choice centre-back along with Pepe, until a lower back injury kept him sidelined. He returned to action on 18 January in Real Madrid's 2–1 home defeat to Barcelona, in the Copa del Rey quarter-finals first leg at the Santiago Bernabéu.

There was significant speculation about his future with Real Madrid in the 2012–13 season, with manager José Mourinho publicly stating on 29 August 2012 that "his services were no longer needed" by the club. However, he opted to stay at the club until the end of his contract.

=== Monaco (2013–2016) ===
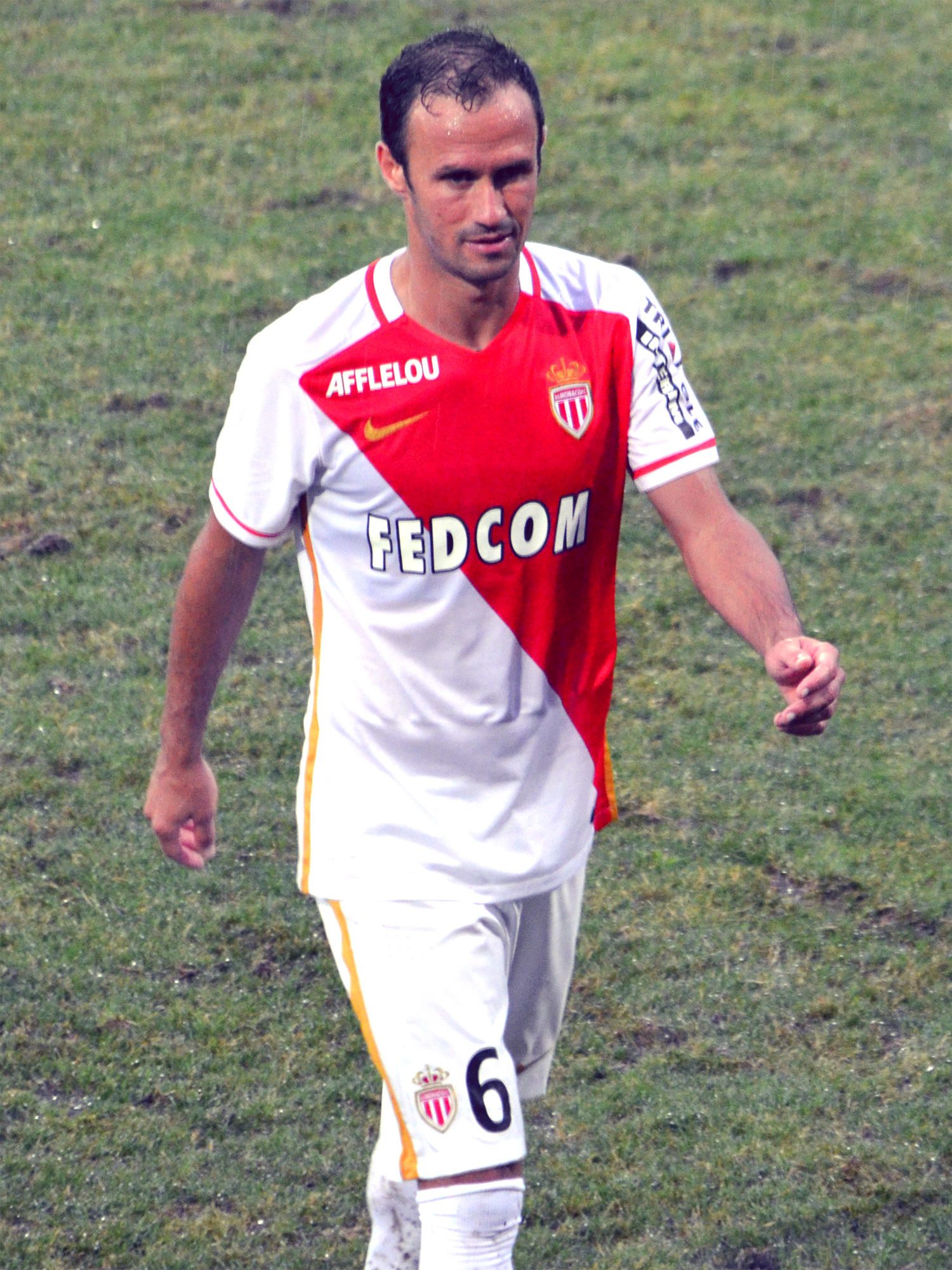
Carvalho playing for Monaco 2015

On 28 May 2013, Monaco confirmed on their website that they had secured the services of the Portuguese defender from Real Madrid. He moved to the newly promoted Ligue 1 club on a free transfer when his Real Madrid contract expired on 1 July. Carvalho signed a one-year contract with Monaco, with the option of a second year.

Carvalho was sent off for two yellow cards on 10 August 2014, as Monaco began their season with a 2–1 defeat at home against Lorient. On 14 April 2015, he fouled Álvaro Morata to concede a penalty which was converted by Arturo Vidal as Monaco lost to Juventus in the first leg of the quarter-finals of the Champions League. In July 2015, he signed a new one-year deal, keeping him at the club until July 2016.

On 10 August 2016, it was announced that Monaco had not renewed his contract, ending a three-year spell with the Ligue 1 club.

=== Shanghai SIPG (2017–2018) ===
On 9 January 2017, Carvalho was announcing his engagement by André Villas-Boas's Shanghai SIPG in the Chinese Super League. He officially joined Shanghai SIPG on 15 February 2017. On 6 October 2017, Carvalho was handed a seven-month suspended prison sentence in Spain for tax fraud.

== International career ==
=== Senior team ===
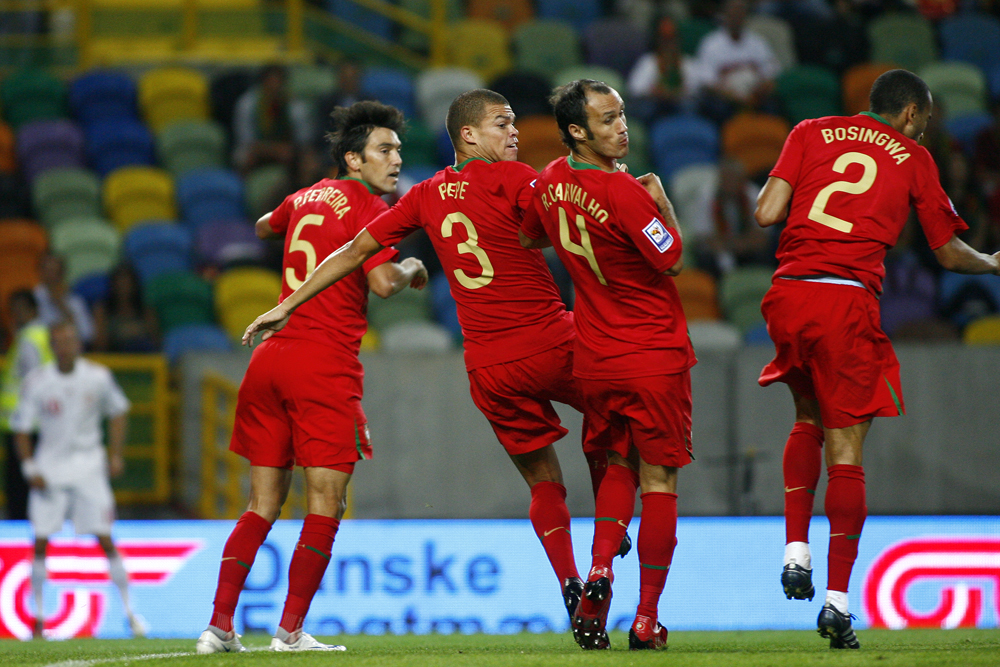
Left to right: Paulo Ferreira, Pepe, Ricardo Carvalho and José Bosingwa, during a 2010 FIFA World Cup qualification match against Denmark, on 10 September 2008.

During the 2003–04 season, Carvalho earned his first cap for the Portugal national team on 11 October 2003 in a 5–3 friendly match win over Albania. He established himself as a key member of the national team starting XI during the UEFA Euro 2004 championship on home soil, after replacing captain Fernando Couto in the heart of Portugal's defence following the team's defeat against Greece in the opening group game. In the tournament, he was nominated for the UEFA Euro Team of the Tournament along with his compatriots Maniche, Luís Figo and Cristiano Ronaldo. Carvalho formed a strong partnership with Jorge Andrade in the Portuguese defence as his country reached the final, though they lost 1–0 to Greece in a stunning upset. Carvalho started in all of Portugal's six games in the tournament, including an epic game against England, where the defender was named Carlsberg Man of the Match, and Portugal emerged victorious 6–5 on penalties. BBC Sport football expert Alan Hansen said that Carvalho was, along with Sol Campbell, the best defender at Euro 2004.

Carvalho represented Portugal at the 2006 World Cup in Germany, finishing fourth overall. During the quarter-final game against England, referee Horacio Elizondo adjudged Wayne Rooney to have trodden on Carvalho's groin, right in front of him, and the English player was sent off for violent conduct. The English media, however, speculated that teammate Cristiano Ronaldo had influenced Elizondo's decision by aggressively complaining, after which he was seen in replays winking at the Portuguese bench following Rooney’s dismissal. In the following semi-final game against France in Munich on 5 July 2006, Carvalho was whistled for a foul against France's Thierry Henry in the penalty area, resulting in a penalty kick. Zinedine Zidane converted the spot kick to give France a 1–0 win over Portugal. Also in the same game, Carvalho was booked with his second yellow card of the knockout phase, and was forced to miss the third place game against hosts Germany on 8 July in Stuttgart, which ended in a 3–1 defeat. He in played each of his team's other preceding matches throughout the World Cup, as a member of Portugal's central defensive pairing in the team's starting lineup alongside Fernando Meira, and as a result of his performances, he was one of the 23 players nominated for the All Star Team of the tournament.

Carvalho was named in the Portuguese squad for Euro 2008. He played in three of Portugal's four matches in the tournament, including the 2–0 win against Turkey and the 3–1 victory over Czech Republic in the group stage and the quarter-finals match where Portugal lost 3–2 to Germany. Two years later, Carvalho was named again in the Portuguese squad for the 2010 World Cup. He formed a partnership with Bruno Alves in the centre of defence, playing in all group stage matches without conceding a goal. This time, Portugal reached the round of 16, where they subsequently lost 1–0 against Spain via a David Villa goal.

On 31 August 2011, Carvalho retired from international football after leaving the concentration without talking to his coach and teammates before Portugal's match against Cyprus for a Euro 2012 qualifying match, announcing in a statement carried by state news agency Lusa he had been "disrespected".

On 3 October 2014, after an absence of more than three years, Carvalho was called up by newly appointed Portugal manager Fernando Santos, for the friendly against France and the Euro 2016 qualifying match against Denmark. On 29 March 2015, in a qualifier against Serbia, he headed the opening goal in a 2–1 home victory, his first international goal for over eight years. At 38, he was the oldest outfield player at the Euro 2016 finals in France. He started in all three of his team's group stages matches, but was dropped from the starting line-up for the knock-out stages of the competition; Portugal went on to win the tournament, defeating the hosts 1–0 in the final in extra time, although Carvalho remained on the bench.

=== International goals ===
==== Under–21 ====
No.	Date	Venue	Opponent	Score	Result	Competition
1.	25 March 1998	Estádio Municipal 25 de Abril, Tomar, Portugal	Belgium	1–0	1–2	Friendly

==== Senior team ====
List of international goals scored by Ricardo Carvalho
No.	Date	Venue	Opponent	Score	Result	Competition
1.	3 September 2005	Estádio Algarve, Faro, Portugal	Luxembourg	2–0	6–0	2006 FIFA World Cup qualification
2.	1 September 2006	Brøndby Stadium, Copenhagen, Denmark	Denmark	1–1	4–2	Friendly
3.	7 October 2006	Bessa XXI, Porto, Portugal	Azerbaijan	2–0	3–0	UEFA Euro 2008 qualification
4.	7 February 2007	Emirates Stadium, London, England	Brazil	0–2	0–2	Friendly
5.	29 March 2015	Estádio da Luz, Lisbon, Portugal	Serbia	1–0	2–1	UEFA Euro 2016 qualification

== Style of play ==
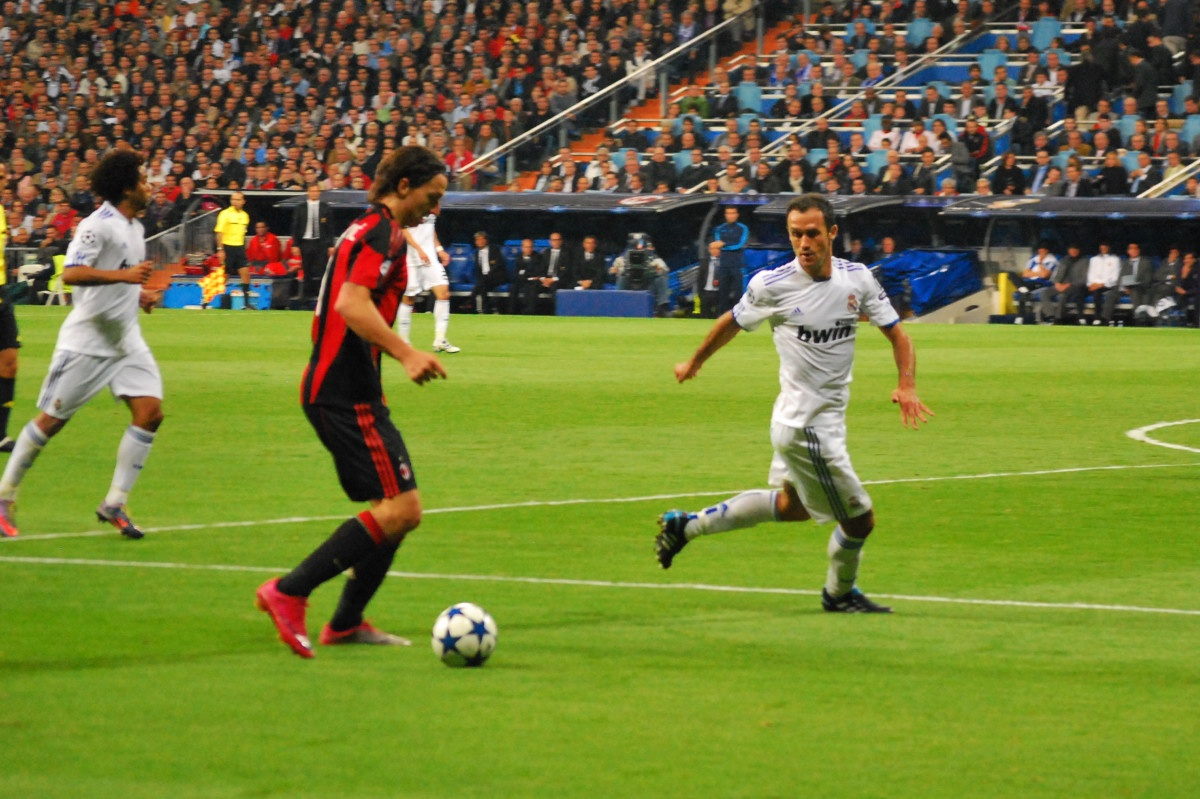
Carvalho (right) defending against Zlatan Ibrahimović (left).

Carvalho was always a centre back who stood out in particular for his intelligence, and ability to read the game and time his challenges. He was quick, good in the air and possessed superb technique and good passing ability, which led him to be compared to the legendary Italian defender Franco Baresi. Although he did not possess the physical strength of other defenders, he was known for his tenacity and hard-tackling style of play; in an interview with the Champions League's official magazine, Carvalho said of his playing style and physique:

(...) Players who grow in England are different, they are tough, strong. My first year was difficult because I wanted the ball, wanted to play, and the pace here is unbelievable. The players are physically strong, and if they don't play well they kick. It wasn't my game. And every time I jumped with my arm my shoulder would pop out. With time it got weaker. In May 2005 I had an operation, I started to work a bit in the gym, which I'd never done before, and I improved a lot. (...) My body is not as strong as a normal centre-back in England, but I like to play hard and tackle. I love to make crazy tackles, I like to slide on the ground.

As such throughout his career, he was often paired with a more physical centre-back, such as his defensive partner at Chelsea, John Terry, whose powerful and aggressive playing style was complemented by Carvalho's mobility, technique, intelligence, speed of thought, and ball–playing ability. Despite not being as tall as most centre-backs at 1.83 m (6 ft 0 in), Carvalho was also known for his ability to win aerial duels against larger, more physical opponents, as demonstrated by the three headed goals he scored against Manchester United with Rio Ferdinand and Nemanja Vidić in defence. In the same UEFA Champions League's official magazine interview, he stated:

(...) At Porto there were taller centre-backs than me, but they were on the bench because I was quicker, I turned quicker. I said to the coach, 'I have to grow a bit.' But he said: 'No, you'll start to get slow to turn, slow to run. You're good, you are there now.' (...) A defender is one thing, football is about defending and playing. Normally, play comes from us defenders so we have to defend, not concede, close down space, be focused on the strikers and after all that try to get a move going. (...)

Carvalho's Real Madrid profile described him as "known for his perfect positioning, his foresight and his ability to advance the ball out of the first third". At his peak, Carvalho was regarded by several pundits and football figures as one of the best defenders in the world, and is considered to be one of the greatest defenders in the history of the Premier League.

== Coaching career ==
Throughout André Villas-Boas' time as manager of French club Olympique de Marseille, Carvalho served as his assistant manager.

He joined the coaching staff of Roberto Martínez with the Portugal national team in 2023, serving as Assistant Head Coach to Martínez alongside Scotsman Austin MacPhee. During his time with Portugal, the team has won the 2025 UEFA Nations League, beating Spain in the final on penalties; additionally, the team qualified for the 2026 FIFA World Cup, finishing second in their group.

== Career statistics ==
=== Club ===
As of 26 November 2017

Club	League	Season	League		Cup		League Cup^{[A]}		Continental		Other^{[B]}		Total	
Club	League	Season	Apps	Goals	Apps	Goals	Apps	Goals	Apps	Goals	Apps	Goals	Apps	Goals
Leça (loan)	Primeira Liga	1997–98	22	1	2	0	—		—		—		24	1
Porto	Primeira Liga	1998–99	1	0	0	0	—		0	0	0	0	1	0
Vitória de Setúbal (loan)	Primeira Liga	1999–2000	25	2	2	0	—		—		—		27	2
Alverca (loan)	Primeira Liga	2000–01	29	1	3	0	—		—		—		32	1
Porto	Primeira Liga	2001–02	25	0	2	0	—		10	0	—		37	0
Porto	Primeira Liga	2002–03	18	1	6	0	—		7	0	1	0	32	1
Porto	Primeira Liga	2003–04	29	2	3	0	—		13	1	1	0	46	3
Porto	Primeira Liga	Total	72	3	11	0	—		30	1	2	0	115	4
Chelsea	Premier League	2004–05	25	1	1	0	3	0	10	0	—		39	1
Chelsea	Premier League	2005–06	24	1	3	0	0	0	8	2	0	0	35	3
Chelsea	Premier League	2006–07	31	3	5	1	4	0	10	0	1	0	51	4
Chelsea	Premier League	2007–08	21	1	2	0	4	0	10	0	1	0	38	1
Chelsea	Premier League	2008–09	12	1	2	0	0	0	4	0	—		18	1
Chelsea	Premier League	2009–10	22	0	1	0	0	0	5	0	1	1	29	1
Chelsea	Premier League	Total	135	7	14	1	11	0	47	2	3	1	210	11
Real Madrid	La Liga	2010–11	33	3	6	0	—		9	0	—		48	3
Real Madrid	La Liga	2011–12	8	0	1	0	—		2	0	2	0	13	0
Real Madrid	La Liga	2012–13	9	0	6	0	—		1	0	0	0	16	0
Real Madrid	La Liga	Total	50	3	13	0	—		12	0	2	0	77	3
Monaco	Ligue 1	2013–14	37	0	3	0	0	0	—		—		40	0
Monaco	Ligue 1	2014–15	25	0	1	0	2	0	6	0	—		34	0
Monaco	Ligue 1	2015–16	33	2	1	0	2	0	8	0	—		44	2
Monaco	Ligue 1	Total	95	2	5	0	4	0	14	0	—		118	2
Shanghai SIPG	Chinese Super League	2017	4	0	2	0	—		0	0	—		6	0
Career total			433	19	55	1	15	0	103	3	7	1	610	24

=== International ===
As of 22 June 2016

National team	Year	Apps	Goals
Portugal	2003	1	0
Portugal	2004	14	0
Portugal	2005	7	1
Portugal	2006	13	2
Portugal	2007	5	1
Portugal	2008	9	0
Portugal	2009	11	0
Portugal	2010	12	0
Portugal	2011	3	0
Portugal	2012	0	0
Portugal	2013	0	0
Portugal	2014	3	0
Portugal	2015	5	1
Portugal	2016	6	0
Portugal	Total	89	5

== Honours ==
Porto

- Primeira Divisão/Liga: 1998–99, 2002–03, 2003–04
- Taça de Portugal: 2002–03
- Supertaça Cândido de Oliveira: 2003
- UEFA Champions League: 2003–04
- UEFA Cup: 2002–03

Chelsea

- Premier League: 2004–05, 2005–06, 2009–10
- FA Cup: 2006–07, 2008–09, 2009–10
- Football League Cup: 2004–05, 2006–07; runner-up: 2007–08
- FA Community Shield: 2005, 2009

Real Madrid

- La Liga: 2011–12
- Copa del Rey: 2010–11
- Supercopa de España: 2011–12

Portugal

- UEFA European Championship: 2016

Individual

- UEFA Club Best Defender of the Year: 2003–04
- UEFA Team of the Year: 2004
- UEFA European Championship Team of the Tournament: 2004
- FIFA World Cup All-Star Team: 2006
- Chelsea Players' Player of the Year: 2008
- FIFA FIFPro World XI Nominee 2005, 2007, 2008, 2011

Orders

- Medal of Merit, Order of the Immaculate Conception of Vila Viçosa (House of Braganza)
- Commander of the Order of Merit

== Footnotes ==
A. Includes the Football League Cup and the Portuguese League Cup. The Portuguese League Cup was founded only in 2007, so Ricardo Carvalho never played in this tournament.
B. Includes other competitive competitions, including the Portuguese Super Cup, FA Community Shield, Supercopa de España and the UEFA Super Cup.
