= 2003 Supertaça Cândido de Oliveira =

- Event: Supertaça Cândido de Oliveira (Portuguese Super Cup)
Porto	União de Leiria
1	0
- Date: 10 August 2003
- Venue: Estádio D. Afonso Henriques, Guimarães
- Man of the Match: Costinha (Porto)
- Referee: Pedro Proença (Lisbon)

The 2003 Supertaça Cândido de Oliveira was the 25th edition of the Supertaça Cândido de Oliveira, the annual Portuguese football season-opening match contested by the winners of the previous season's top league and cup competitions (or cup runner-up in case the league- and cup-winning club is the same). The match took place on the 10 August 2003 at the Estádio D. Afonso Henriques in Guimarães, and was contested between 2002–03 Primeira Liga and 2002–03 Taça de Portugal winners Porto, and cup runners-up União de Leiria.

Porto would defeat União de Leiria 1–0 with an illegal goal. A 53rd minute headed goal from midfielder Costinha was sufficient for the Dragões to defeat Os Lis and claim the Supertaça Cândido de Oliveira for a 13th time in their history.

== Match ==
=== Details ===
10 August 2003
21:00 WEST

Porto	1–0	União de Leiria
Costinha 53'

Estádio D. Afonso Henriques, Guimarães
Referee: Pedro Proença (Lisbon)

Porto	União de Leiria

GK	99	(Portugal) Vítor Baía (c)
RB	22	(Portugal) Paulo Ferreira
CB	3	(Portugal) Pedro Emanuel
CB	4	(Portugal) Ricardo Carvalho
LB	8	(Portugal) Nuno Valente
RM	23	(Portugal) Pedro Mendes	(yellow card) 10'	(substituted off) 45'
CM	18	(Portugal) Maniche
CM	10	(Portugal) Deco	(yellow card) 29'
LM	15	(Russia) Dmitri Alenichev		(substituted off) 87'
CF	77	(South Africa) Benni McCarthy		(substituted off) 73'
CF	11	(Brazil) Derlei
Substitutes:
GK	13	(Portugal) Nuno
DF	5	(Portugal) Ricardo Costa
DF	16	(Portugal) César Peixoto
MF	6	(Portugal) Costinha		(substituted on) 45'
MF	25	(Portugal) Ricardo Fernandes		(substituted on) 87'
FW	9	(Lithuania) Edgaras Jankauskas
FW	20	(Portugal) Marco Ferreira		(substituted on) 73'
Manager:
(Portugal) José Mourinho

GK	1	(Brazil) Helton
RB	2	(Portugal) Luís Bilro (c)
CB	4	(Brazil) Gabriel
CB	19	(Portugal) Paulo Duarte	(yellow card) 14'	(substituted off) 59'
LB	23	(Portugal) João Paulo	(yellow card) 52' (red card) 70'
CM	27	(Brazil) Edson
CM	20	(Brazil) Caíco
CM	5	(Portugal) Paulo Gomes	(yellow card) 54'
RW	9	(Brazil) Ludemar		(substituted off) 71'
LW	11	(Cameroon) Roudolphe Douala
CF	21	(Brazil) Maciel		(substituted off) 79'
Substitutes:
GK	12	(France) Laurent Quievreux
DF	14	(Portugal) Alhandra		(substituted on) 79'
DF	25	(Portugal) Nuno Laranjeiro
MF	7	(Portugal) Sérgio Gameiro		(substituted on) 59'
FW	22	(Angola) Freddy		(substituted on) 71'
Manager:
(Portugal) Vítor Pontes

2003 Supertaça Cândido de Oliveira Winners
Porto
13th Title

- (Portugal) Costinha (Porto)

Match officials

- Assistant referees:
- Fourth official:

Match rules

- 90 minutes
- 30 minutes of extra time if necessary.
- Penalty shoot-out if scores level after extra-time
- Maximum of three substitutions

== See also ==
- 2003–04 Primeira Liga
- 2003–04 Taça de Portugal
- 2003–04 FC Porto season
