= Ricardo Costa (footballer, born 1981) =

Portuguese footballer

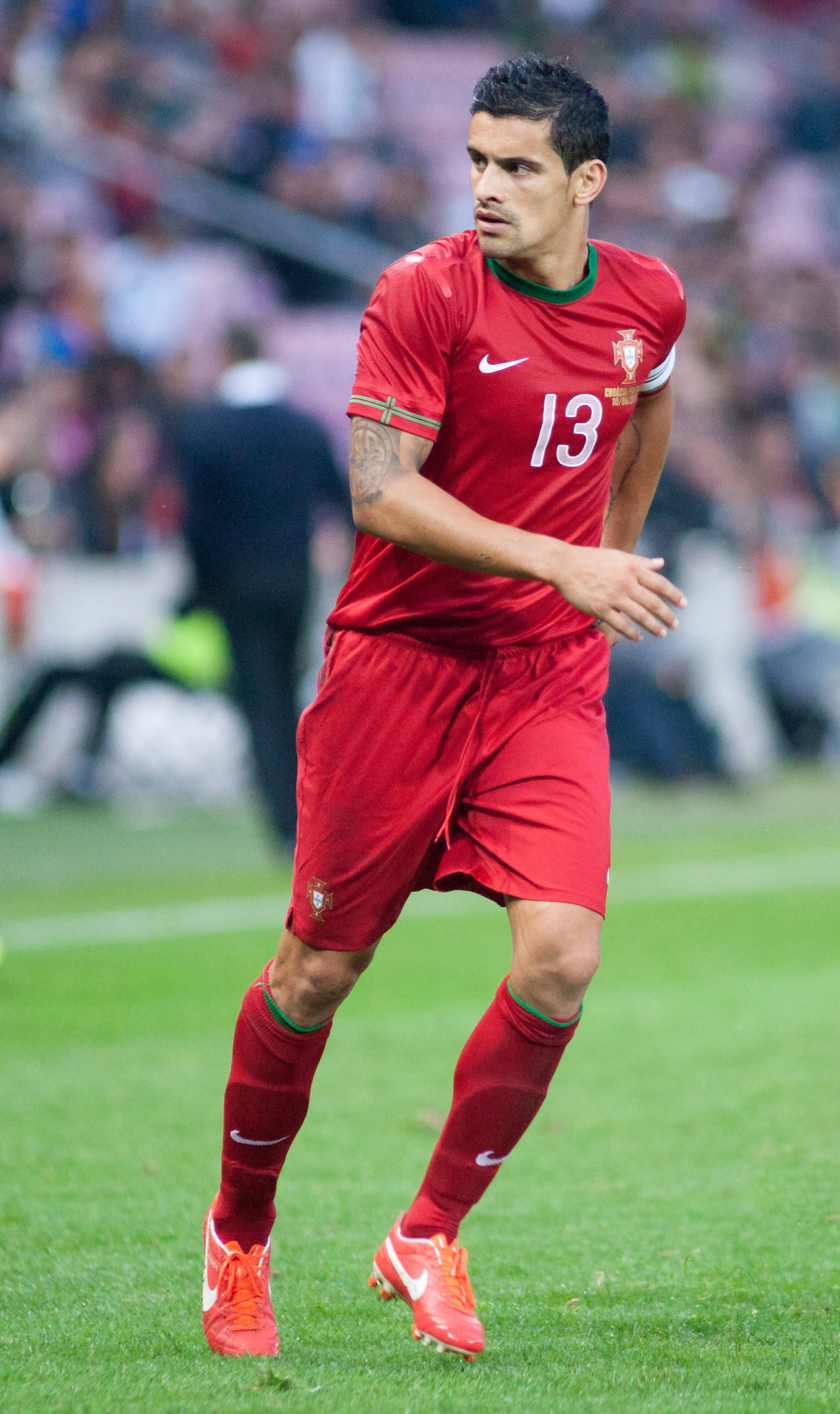
- Costa playing for Portugal in 2013

Personal information
- Full name: Ricardo Miguel Moreira da Costa
- Date of birth: 16 May 1981 (age 45)
- Place of birth: Vila Nova de Gaia, Portugal
- Height: 1.83 m (6 ft 0 in)
- Position: Defender

Team information
- Current team: Tondela (manager)

Youth career
- 1989–1992: Valadares Gaia
- 1992–2000: Boavista

Senior career*
Years	Team	Apps	(Gls)
2000–2003	Porto B	66	(12)
2002–2007	Porto	75	(3)
2007–2010	VfL Wolfsburg	42	(6)
2010	→ Lille (loan)	10	(0)
2010–2014	Valencia	87	(7)
2014–2015	Al-Sailiya	15	(1)
2015–2016	PAOK	26	(0)
2016	Granada	14	(1)
2016–2017	Luzern	33	(1)
2017–2019	Tondela	59	(3)
2019–2020	Boavista	31	(1)
Total		458	(35)

International career
1999	Portugal U18	7	(0)
2001–2002	Portugal U20	13	(2)
2001–2004	Portugal U21	23	(0)
2005–2014	Portugal	22	(1)

Managerial career
- 2022–2024: Porto (under-17)
- 2024–2025: Dila
- 2025–2026: Feirense
- 2026–: Tondela
Medal record
Men's football
Representing Portugal
UEFA European Championship
Bronze medal – third place	2012 Poland-Ukraine
UEFA European Under-21 Championship
Third place	2004 Germany
- * Club domestic league appearances and goals

Ricardo Miguel Moreira da Costa (Portuguese pronunciation: [ʁiˈkaɾðu ˈkɔʃtɐ]; born 16 May 1981) is a Portuguese former professional footballer who played mainly as a central defender but occasionally as a full-back. He is the current manager of Liga Portugal 2 club Tondela.

After making his senior debut with Porto (where he was only a reserve), he went on to play in Germany, France, Spain, Qatar, Greece and Switzerland, mainly spending several years with Valencia in the third country. Over ten seasons, he amassed Primeira Liga totals of 165 matches and seven goals.

A Portugal international since 2005, Costa represented the nation in three World Cups and Euro 2012.

== Club career ==
=== Porto ===
Costa, a product of Boavista FC's youth system, was born in Vila Nova de Gaia, Porto District, and moved to neighbours FC Porto when he was still an apprentice. He made his Primeira Liga debut in a 20 January 2002 derby precisely against Boavista (2–0 away loss, 90 minutes played), but never became more than a fringe player, being preferred in the stopper's pecking order in consecutive seasons to namesake Jorge, Pedro Emanuel, Pepe and Bruno Alves.

On 21 May 2003, Costa replaced the injured Costinha in the first minutes of the 2003 UEFA Cup final in Seville, which ended in a 3–2 win over Celtic.

=== Wolfsburg ===
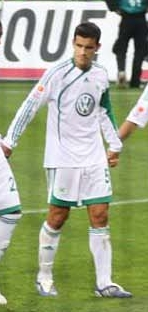
Costa at VfL Wolfsburg in October 2009

In July 2007, as first-team opportunities appeared few at Porto, Costa signed with Bundesliga club VfL Wolfsburg on a three-year contract. After a shaky start, he finished the season as an undisputed starter as the side qualified for the UEFA Cup.

Costa scored just 15 seconds after his introduction in a match against Karlsruher SC on 28 September 2008, making it the second-fastest goal ever scored by a substitute. In the summer of 2009, he was about to be transferred to Real Zaragoza, but the deal collapsed after the two parties could not reach an agreement; the move was finally cancelled on 29 July, and the player returned to Wolfsburg.

On 28 January 2010, although he was being used regularly, Costa joined Lille OSC in France.

=== Valencia ===
On 17 May 2010, after having contributed relatively to Lille's fourth place in Ligue 1, he moved teams and countries again, joining Valencia CF of Spain on a four-year contract. He scored his first goal on 9 March 2011, putting the Che ahead at FC Schalke 04 in the round of 16 of the UEFA Champions League, a 3–1 defeat (4–2 on aggregate).

In the ensuing off-season, Costa was selected by manager Unai Emery as one of the team's captains. However, things quickly turned sour for the former: he was replaced at half-time of an eventual 4–3 home win against Racing de Santander, and quickly went from first to fourth choice after unflaterring comments directed against his teammates and management.

=== Later career ===
Costa left Valencia by mutual consent on 21 July 2014, as his contract was due to expire in June 2015. One week later, he agreed to a two-year deal at Al-Sailiya SC. He scored his first and only goal for the Qatari club on 30 October, in a 4–3 home victory over Al-Wakrah SC.

PAOK FC signed Costa in late January 2015, following a successful medical; in an interview to Portuguese newspaper A Bola a few months after his transfer, he talked about his experience in Asia by stating: "It was a completely different reality, that I couldn't accept. Everything was so non-professional". During his 12-month tenure he appeared in 37 games in all competitions, his only goal coming on 27 August 2015 in a 1–1 draw at Brøndby IF in the play-off round of the Europa League.

Costa returned to Spain and its top division on 1 February 2016, to join Granada CF until June 2017; he vowed to defend his new team "to the death". His first appearance took place six days later, as he played the full 90 minutes in a 1–2 home loss against Real Madrid.

On 5 July 2016, after contributing 14 starts and one goal to his side's eventual survival, Costa had his contract terminated by mutual consent. He resumed his career at FC Luzern in Switzerland days later.

The 36-year-old Costa returned to Portugal after one decade in June 2017, signing a two-year deal at top-flight club C.D. Tondela. On 1 July 2019, he returned to Boavista.

On 13 August 2020, shortly after having announced his retirement, Costa was named sporting director at Boavista. He resigned the following 29 January due to conflicts with the fanbase.

== International career ==
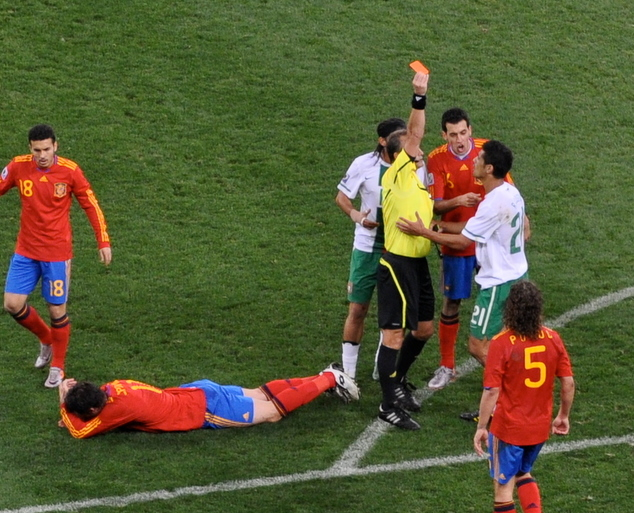
Héctor Baldassi shows a red card to Costa in the 2010 World Cup match against Spain

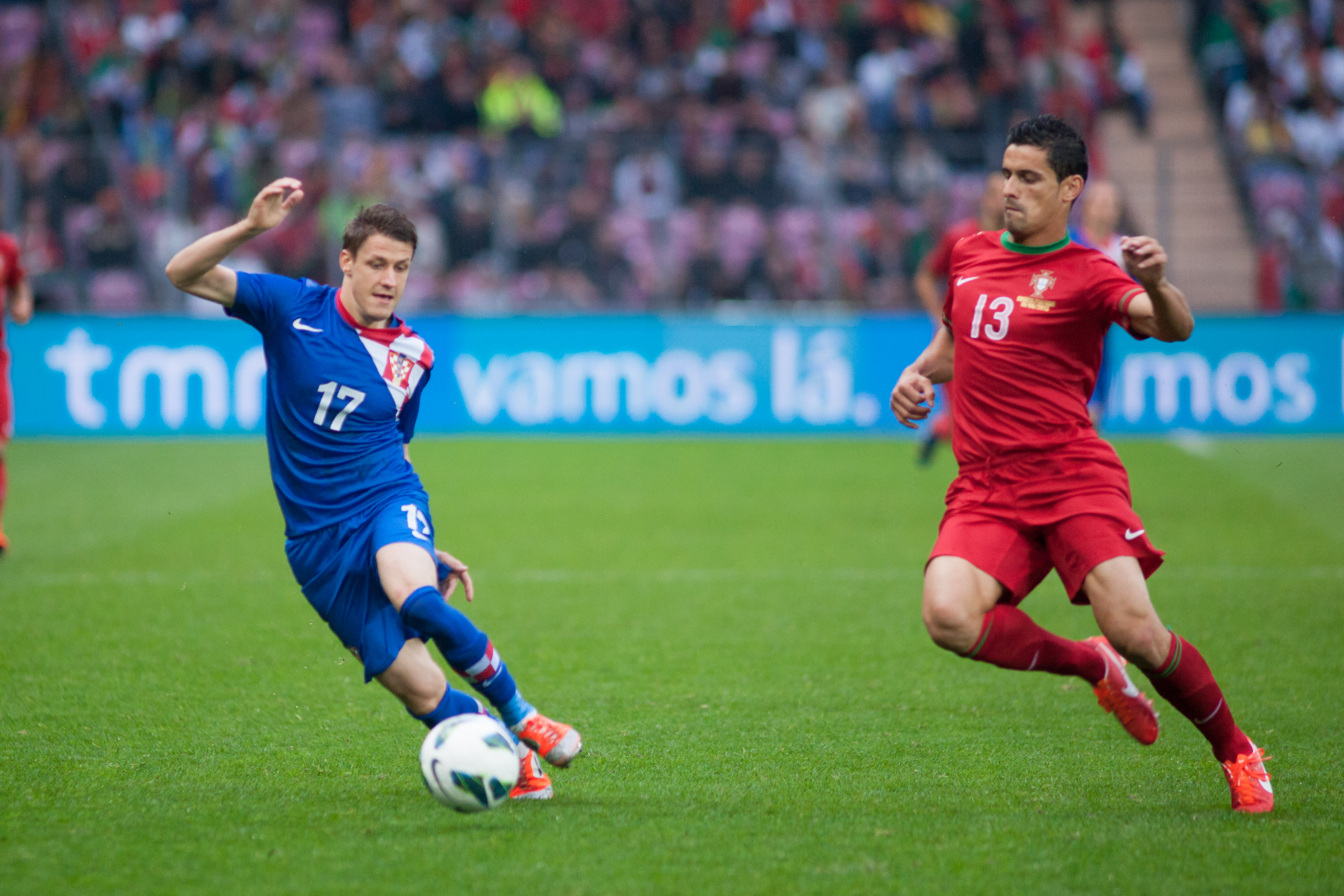
Costa (right) in action against Croatia in a 2013 friendly

Costa played for Portugal at under-21 level and was also a part of the Olympic team that played in the 2004 Summer Olympics in Athens. A full international since 2005, he was called up to the squad for the 2006 FIFA World Cup, where he appeared against Germany in the 3–1 third-place playoff loss.

On 10 May 2010, national team boss Carlos Queiroz announced a provisional list of 24 players in view for the 2010 World Cup in South Africa, with Costa being included, thus returning to the squad after a four-year absence. He played twice in the tournament, always as right-back: in the 0–0 group stage draw against Brazil, and the round-of-16 defeat to Spain (1–0, where he was sent off in the last minute, receiving a three-match ban for his actions).

Costa played and started two games in the 2014 World Cup qualifying campaign. He scored his only international goal on 11 October 2013 in a 1–1 home draw against Israel, and was named by manager Paulo Bento in the final 23-man squad for the tournament in Brazil.

On 16 June 2014, Costa became the second Portuguese to play in three World Cups after Cristiano Ronaldo did so in the same match, coming on for the second half of the first group stage match against Germany, a 4–0 loss. He was then selected to replace the suspended Pepe in a 2–2 draw with the United States, making a goal-line clearance from Michael Bradley in the second half.

== Coaching career ==
On 18 July 2022, Costa was named manager of Porto's under-17 team. Previously, he was part of the staff at the club's under-19s.

On 8 July 2024, Costa was appointed at FC Dila Gori in the Georgian Erovnuli Liga. He achieved a third place in his first season, collecting eight wins from 18 matches.

Costa returned to Portugal in June 2025, on a contract at Liga Portugal 2 side C.D. Feirense. For the following campaign, he remained in the league as head coach of his former employers Tondela.

== Career statistics ==
=== Club ===
As of match played on 13 May 2018

Appearances and goals by club, season and competition
Club	Season	League			National Cup (Note: Includes Taça de Portugal, DFB-Pokal and Copa del Rey matches.)		League Cup		Continental		Other		Total	
Club	Season	Division	Apps	Goals	Apps	Goals	Apps	Goals	Apps	Goals	Apps	Goals	Apps	Goals
Porto	2001–02	Primeira Liga	6	0	0	0	—		0	0	—		6	0
Porto	2002–03	Primeira Liga	10	0	4	0	—		6 (Note: Appearances in UEFA Europa League)	1	—		20	1
Porto	2003–04	Primeira Liga	9	1	5	0	—		0	0	—		14	1
Porto	2004–05	Primeira Liga	24	1	1	0	—		6 (Note: Appearances in UEFA Champions League)	1	—		31	2
Porto	2005–06	Primeira Liga	18	1	2	0	—		3	0	—		23	1
Porto	2006–07	Primeira Liga	8	0	1	0	—		2	0	—		11	0
Porto	Total		75	3	13	0	—		17	2	—		105	5
Wolfsburg	2007–08	Bundesliga	20	2	3	0	—		—		—		23	2
Wolfsburg	2008–09	Bundesliga	11	3	2	0	—		6	0	—		19	3
Wolfsburg	2009–10	Bundesliga	11	1	0	0	—		5	0	—		16	1
Wolfsburg	Total		42	6	5	0	—		11	0	—		58	6
Lille	2009–10	Ligue 1	10	1	0	0	—		—		—		10	1
Valencia	2010–11	La Liga	29	0	2	0	—		7	1	—		38	1
Valencia	2011–12	La Liga	12	0	1	0	—		5	1	—		18	1
Valencia	2012–13	La Liga	26	4	4	0	—		6	0	—		36	4
Valencia	2013–14	La Liga	20	3	3	0	—		9	1	—		32	4
Valencia	Total		87	7	10	0	—		27	3	—		124	10
Al-Sailiya	2014–15	Qatar Stars League	15	1	0	0	—		—		—		15	1
PAOK	2014–15	Super League Greece	15	0	0	0	—		—		—		15	0
PAOK	2015–16	Super League Greece	11	0	1	0	—		10	1	—		22	1
PAOK	Total		26	0	1	0	—		10	1	—		37	1
Granada	2015–16	La Liga	14	1	0	0	—		—		—		14	1
Luzern	2016–17	Swiss Super League	33	1	3	0	—		2	0	—		38	1
Tondela	2017–18	Primeira Liga	32	2	1	0	1	0	—		—		34	2
Career total			334	22	33	0	1	0	67	6	—		435	28

=== International ===
National team	Year	Apps	Goals
Portugal	2005	2	0
Portugal	2006	4	0
Portugal	2010	4	0
Portugal	2012	3	0
Portugal	2013	4	1
Portugal	2014	5	0
Portugal	Total	22	1

List of international goals scored by Ricardo Costa
No.	Date	Venue	Opponent	Score	Result	Competition
1	11 October 2013	Estádio José Alvalade, Lisbon, Portugal	Israel	1–0	1–1	2014 World Cup qualification

== Honours ==
Porto

- Primeira Liga: 2002–03, 2003–04, 2005–06, 2006–07
- Taça de Portugal: 2002–03, 2005–06
- Supertaça Cândido de Oliveira: 2003, 2004, 2006
- UEFA Champions League: 2003–04
- UEFA Cup: 2002–03
- Intercontinental Cup: 2004

VfL Wolfsburg

- Bundesliga: 2008–09

Orders

- Medal of Merit, Order of the Immaculate Conception of Vila Viçosa (House of Braganza)
