= Pedro Mendes (footballer, born 1979) =

Portuguese footballer and agent

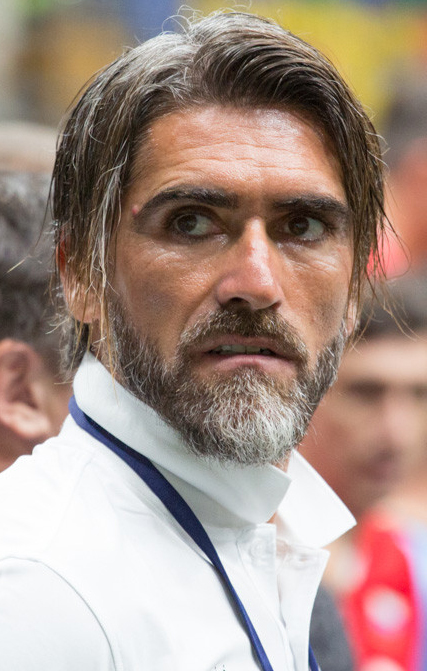
- Mendes in 2018

Personal information
- Full name: Pedro Miguel da Silva Mendes
- Date of birth: 26 February 1979 (age 47)
- Place of birth: Guimarães, Portugal
- Height: 1.80 m (5 ft 11 in)
- Position: Midfielder

Senior career*
| Years | Team | Apps | (Gls) |
| 1998–2003 | Vitória Guimarães | 82 | (7) |
| 1998–1999 | → Felgueiras (loan) | 31 | (2) |
| 2003–2004 | Porto | 26 | (0) |
| 2004–2006 | Tottenham Hotspur | 30 | (1) |
| 2006–2008 | Portsmouth | 58 | (5) |
| 2008–2010 | Rangers | 39 | (4) |
| 2010–2011 | Sporting CP | 18 | (0) |
| 2011–2012 | Vitória Guimarães | 14 | (0) |
| Total | | 298 | (18) |

International career
| 2002–2010 | Portugal | 11 | (0) |
- * Club domestic league appearances and goals

Pedro Miguel da Silva Mendes (Portuguese pronunciation: [ˈpeðɾu ˈmẽdɨʃ]; born 26 February 1979) is a Portuguese former professional footballer who played as a midfielder. He works as a football agent.

Starting his career with home town club Vitória de Guimarães, Mendes won the UEFA Champions League with Porto in the 2003–04 season. He then moved to the Premier League, initially with Tottenham Hotspur in 2004, where he famously scored a 45-yard ghost goal against Manchester United that was wrongly not given by the officials despite goalkeeper Roy Carroll having fumbled his catch and clawed the ball back from at least a yard behind the goal line. He then moved to his second English club, Portsmouth, before a stint at Scottish Premier League side Rangers.

Mendes was capped twelve times by the Portugal national team and was a member of their squad for the 2010 FIFA World Cup.

== Club career ==
=== Early career ===
Mendes began his professional career with Felgueiras, on a one-year loan from Vitória de Guimarães. He returned to Guimarães and stayed for four seasons before moving on to Porto. At Porto, he won the 2003–04 UEFA Champions League, Primeira Liga and the Cândido de Oliveira Super Cup under manager José Mourinho.

=== Tottenham Hotspur ===
On 8 July 2004, Mendes joined Premier League side Tottenham Hotspur in a part-exchange deal which saw Hélder Postiga moving in the opposite direction. Tottenham received €7.5 million for Postiga while paying Porto €3 million for Mendes. His debut was on 14 August in a league match at home to Liverpool. Mendes scored his first goal for the club on 1 January 2005 in a 5–2 league win over Everton.

Mendes' second goal for Tottenham should have come in his next game three days later. However, he was the victim of a controversial and key decision against Manchester United at Old Trafford. His speculative shot from 55 yards out should have been a relatively easy catch for goalkeeper Roy Carroll, who was backtracking from the edge of his penalty area, but the United goalkeeper fumbled the ball over his own goal line. What would have been the game's only goal was not given, as referee Mark Clattenburg deemed the ball not to have crossed the line, despite TV replays showing the ball had clearly gone over the line.

In his second season with Tottenham, Mendes was reduced to a peripheral role. He made only six appearances in the first half of the season, so it came as no surprise that in the January 2006 transfer window, then-Tottenham coach Martin Jol sought to offload him.

=== Portsmouth ===
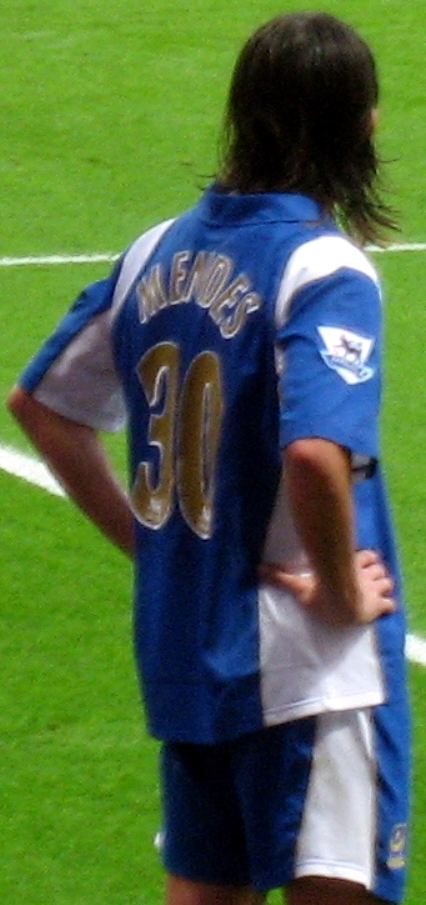
Mendes playing for Portsmouth

Mendes joined Portsmouth on 12 January 2006 in a combined deal that included Sean Davis and Noé Pamarot for a fee of £7.5 million. He became a pivotal player and goal scorer in the club's fight to avoid relegation. Mendes made his Portsmouth debut in a Premier League match against Everton on 14 January. His first and second goals earned him a place in Portsmouth folklore as they came in a crucial match against Manchester City on 11 March. Both goals were 25-yard shots, the first to give Portsmouth the lead on the hour mark and the second, in the 93rd minute, gave the club a 2–1 win.

On 23 August 2006, during another match against Manchester City, Ben Thatcher clattered into Mendes with his elbow, the force of which knocked Mendes head-first into a billboard. The injury was so severe Mendes was knocked out and required oxygen at pitchside. He suffered a seizure while being transferred to hospital, where he spent the night. He was discharged from hospital the next day, but remained under medical supervision. Thatcher only received a yellow card for the foul at the time. Despite the severity of the incident, Mendes was back playing for Portsmouth two weeks later. However, he expressed his shock at the challenge and stated that he had considered quitting the game due to his injuries. Thatcher was fined and suspended by Manchester City, and was charged by The Football Association, but was not sued by Mendes. When they next faced one another in January 2007, Mendes shook hands with Thatcher pre-match, despite claiming beforehand that he would not do so.

In the 2007–08 season, Mendes won his first and only footballing honour during his spell in English football – he started in the Portsmouth side that won the FA Cup after a 1–0 win over Cardiff City in the final on 17 May 2008. Mendes returned to Wembley Stadium three months later as part of the Portsmouth team that contested the 2008 FA Community Shield on 10 August. The match ended 0–0 after extra time, where Manchester United later triumphed 3–1 on penalties.

On 21 February 2012, Mendes signed up to the Portsmouth Supporters Trust to join a group of over 5,000 other Pompey fans uniting in their attempts to take over the ownership of Portsmouth Football Club.

=== Rangers ===
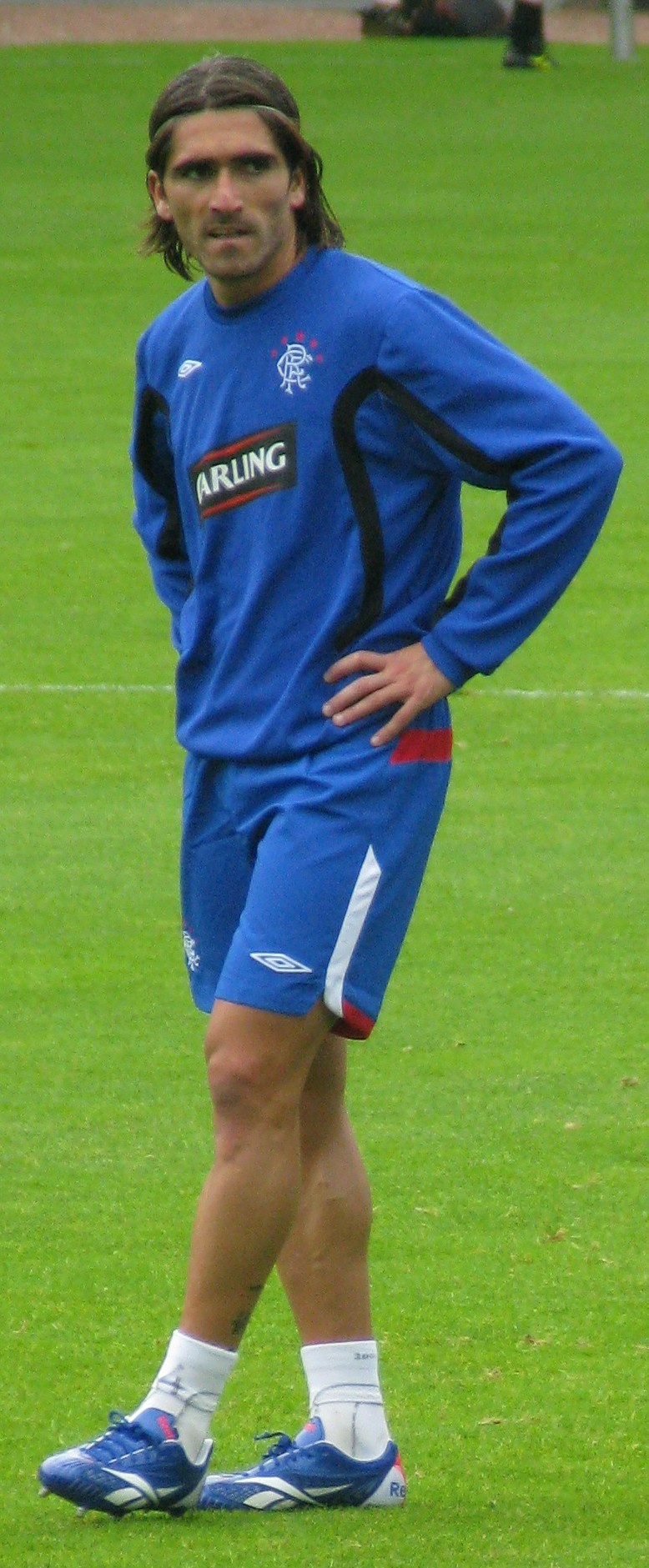
Mendes playing for Rangers

On 15 August 2008, Mendes completed a £3 million transfer to Rangers, signing a three-year contract. He made his debut one day later, starting and winning the man of the match award in the 2–0 Scottish Premier League win over Hearts. He scored his first goal for the club in the first Old Firm match of the season on 31 August 2008. Mendes scored the fourth goal of the match (and Rangers' third) when he received the ball from a Steven Davis corner and drilled it from 25 yards out into the Celtic goal. He was named SPL Player of the Month for August after a string of impressive performances. He scored the second goal of the game in Rangers' title winning game against Dundee United in May 2009 but missed the 2009 Scottish Cup Final due to injury. He won the BBC Sportsound Player of the Year in 2008–09 for accumulating the most man-of-the-match performances throughout the season. The following season, Mendes made eight appearances but was injured in November during a UEFA Champions League match against Unirea Urziceni, which was his final appearance.

=== Later years ===
On 30 January 2010, Mendes joined Sporting CP in a deal worth €1.28 million. When he signed, he became a first choice midfielder for the club under the management of Carlos Carvalhal, and despite the club finishing in a disappointing fourth place, he was praised for his performances. He scored his first goal in his first season of the club in a win over Everton in the UEFA Europa League, and again against former club Rangers in the tournament's round of 32. The next season saw Mendes play less under the new manager of Paulo Bento, where he only managed to play 16 matches throughout the season.

On 15 July 2011, Sporting CP announced that Mendes had agreed to be released from the club and decided to sign with his boyhood club Vitória de Guimarães on a free transfer. He started off the next season by playing against former club Porto in the Cândido de Oliveira Super Cup, which Vitória lost 2–1. From August to January 2012, he started all Vitória's matches in all competitions, including the Primeira Liga, Taça de Portugal, Taça da Liga, and the Europa League. In late January 2012, he sustained an injury which kept him out until the end of the season. He made his recovery in April 2012, where he went on to play the last few matches of the season. At the end of the 2011–12 Primeira Liga, he decided to end his playing career.

== International career ==
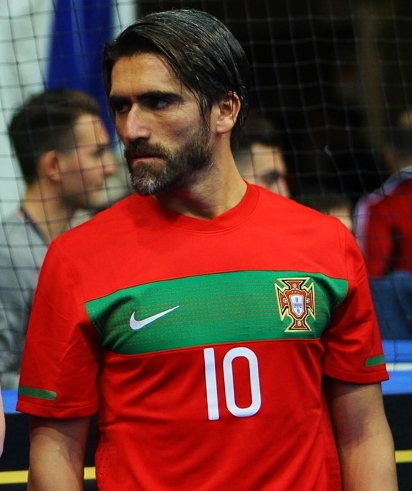
Mendes in Portugal colours, 2015

Mendes made his debut for Portugal as a 57th-minute substitute for Rui Costa on 20 November 2002, during a 2–0 friendly win over Scotland. His second cap came on 12 February 2003 during a 1–0 defeat to Italy.

After a six-year absence from international football, Mendes earned a surprise recall to the Portugal squad on 27 August 2008. He was given another surprise call up in October 2009, and started in the FIFA World Cup qualifier against Hungary, where he played the full match and set-up the second goal in Portugal's 3–0 win. He was then included in Carlos Queiroz's 23-man squad to represent Portugal at the 2010 World Cup, where he took part in every match, two as a starter against the Ivory Coast and North Korea and two as a substitute against Brazil and Spain.

== Career statistics ==
=== Club ===
Appearances and goals by club, season and competition
| Club | Season | League | | | National Cup | | League Cup | | Other (Note: Appearances in Europe and FA Community Shield) | | Total | |
| Club | Season | Division | Apps | Goals | Apps | Goals | Apps | Goals | Apps | Goals | Apps | Goals |
|---|---|---|---|---|---|---|---|---|---|---|---|---|
| Felgueiras (loan) | 1998–99 | Segunda Divisão de Honra | 31 | 2 | 2 | 0 | – | | 0 | 0 | 33 | 2 |
| Vitória de Guimarães | 1999–2000 | Primeira Liga | 12 | 1 | 3 | 0 | – | | 0 | 0 | 15 | 1 |
| Vitória de Guimarães | 2000–01 | Primeira Liga | 12 | 0 | 0 | 0 | – | | 0 | 0 | 12 | 0 |
| Vitória de Guimarães | 2001–02 | Primeira Liga | 26 | 0 | 2 | 0 | – | | 0 | 0 | 28 | 0 |
| Vitória de Guimarães | 2002–03 | Primeira Liga | 32 | 6 | 3 | 0 | – | | 0 | 0 | 35 | 6 |
| Vitória de Guimarães | Total | | 82 | 7 | 8 | 0 | 0 | 0 | 0 | 0 | 90 | 7 |
| Porto | 2003–04 | Primeira Liga | 26 | 0 | 4 | 0 | – | | 11 | 0 | 41 | 0 |
| Tottenham Hotspur | 2004–05 | Premier League | 24 | 1 | 2 | 0 | 4 | 0 | 0 | 0 | 30 | 1 |
| Tottenham Hotspur | 2005–06 | Premier League | 6 | 0 | 0 | 0 | 0 | 0 | 0 | 0 | 6 | 0 |
| Tottenham Hotspur | Total | | 30 | 1 | 2 | 0 | 4 | 0 | 0 | 0 | 36 | 1 |
| Portsmouth | 2005–06 | Premier League | 14 | 3 | 1 | 0 | 0 | 0 | 0 | 0 | 15 | 3 |
| Portsmouth | 2006–07 | Premier League | 26 | 2 | 2 | 0 | 0 | 0 | 0 | 0 | 28 | 2 |
| Portsmouth | 2007–08 | Premier League | 18 | 0 | 3 | 0 | 3 | 0 | 0 | 0 | 24 | 0 |
| Portsmouth | 2008–09 | Premier League | 0 | 0 | 0 | 0 | 0 | 0 | 1 | 0 | 1 | 0 |
| Portsmouth | Total | | 58 | 5 | 6 | 0 | 3 | 0 | 1 | 0 | 68 | 5 |
| Rangers | 2008–09 | Scottish Premier League | 35 | 3 | 3 | 0 | 4 | 1 | 0 | 0 | 42 | 4 |
| Rangers | 2009–10 | Scottish Premier League | 4 | 0 | 0 | 0 | 1 | 0 | 3 | 0 | 8 | 0 |
| Rangers | Total | | 39 | 3 | 3 | 0 | 5 | 1 | 3 | 0 | 50 | 4 |
| Sporting CP | 2009–10 | Primeira Liga | 11 | 0 | 0 | 0 | 1 | 0 | 4 | 1 | 16 | 1 |
| Sporting CP | 2010–11 | Primeira Liga | 7 | 0 | 2 | 0 | 3 | 0 | 4 | 1 | 16 | 1 |
| Sporting CP | Total | | 18 | 0 | 2 | 0 | 4 | 0 | 8 | 2 | 32 | 2 |
| Vitória de Guimarães | 2011–12 | Primeira Liga | 14 | 0 | 1 | 0 | 2 | 0 | 5 | 0 | 22 | 0 |
| Career total | | | 298 | 18 | 28 | 0 | 18 | 1 | 28 | 2 | 372 | 21 |

=== International ===
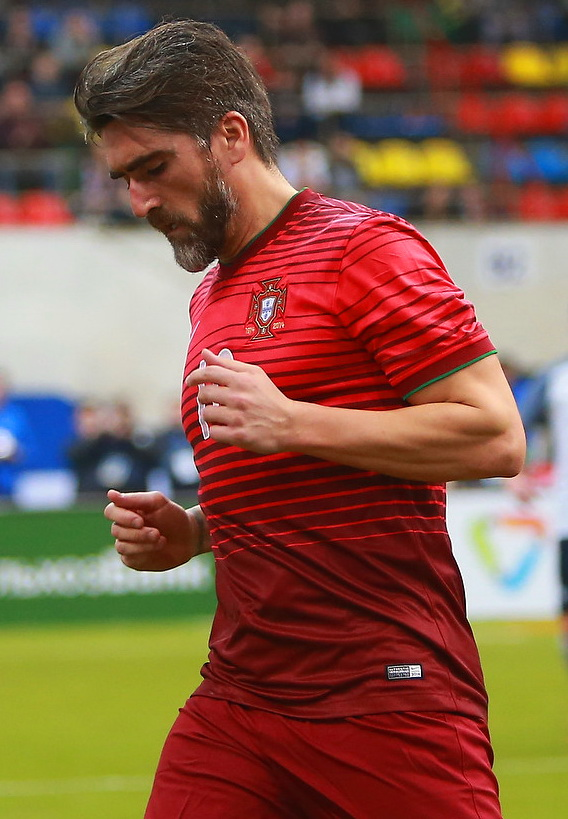
Mendes in 2018

Appearances and goals by national team and year
| National team | Year | Apps | Goals |
|---|---|---|---|
| Portugal | 2002 | 1 | 0 |
| Portugal | 2003 | 1 | 0 |
| Portugal | 2004 | 0 | 0 |
| Portugal | 2005 | 0 | 0 |
| Portugal | 2006 | 0 | 0 |
| Portugal | 2007 | 0 | 0 |
| Portugal | 2008 | 0 | 0 |
| Portugal | 2009 | 2 | 0 |
| Portugal | 2010 | 7 | 0 |
| Total | | 11 | 0 |

== Honours ==
Porto

- Primeira Liga: 2003–04
- Supertaça Cândido de Oliveira: 2003
- UEFA Champions League: 2003–04
- Taça de Portugal runner-up: 2003–04

Portsmouth

- FA Cup: 2007–08

Rangers

- Scottish Premier League: 2008–09, 2009–10
