= Paulo Ferreira =

Portuguese former footballer (born 1979)

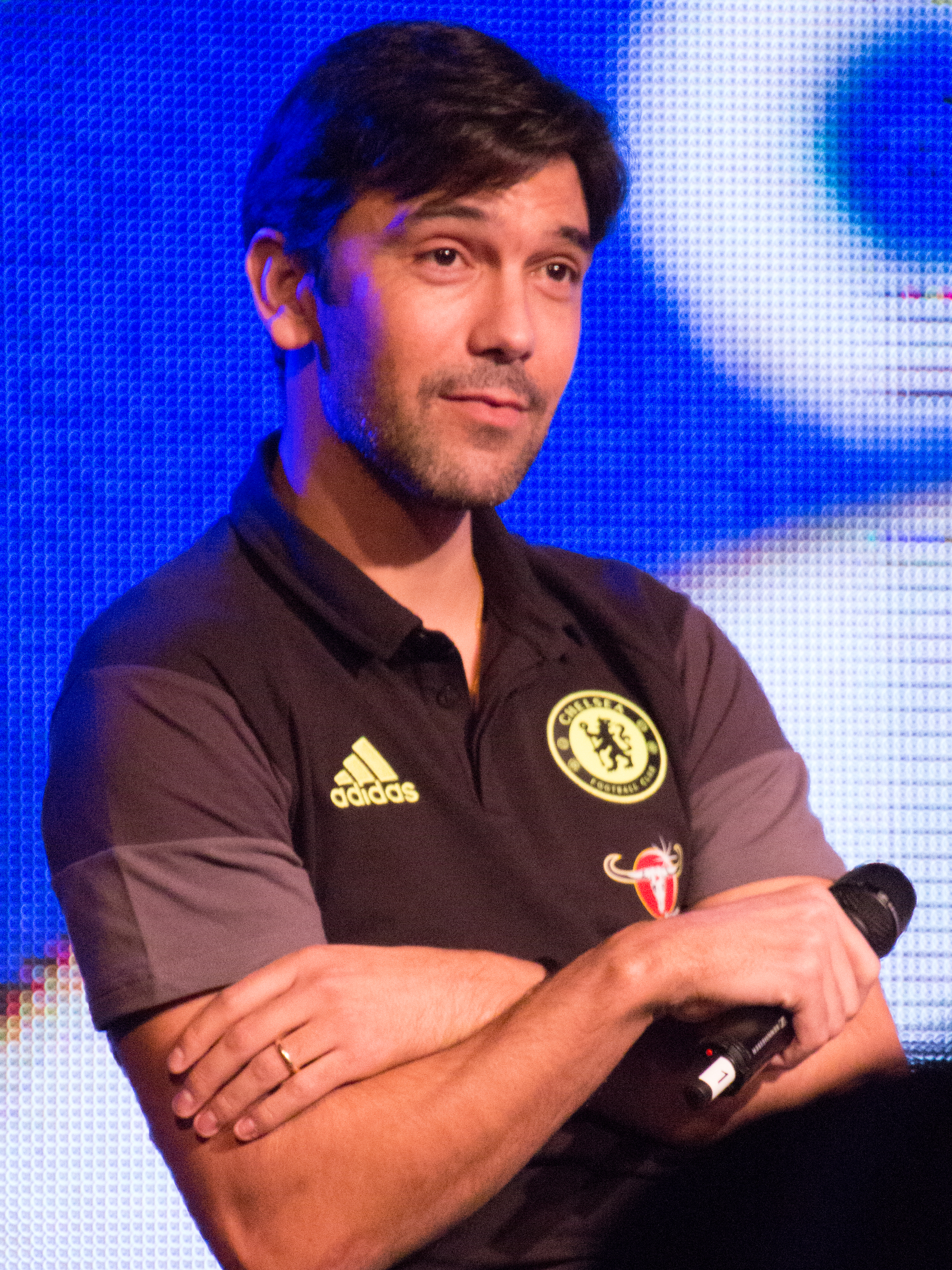
- Ferreira with Chelsea in 2017

Personal information
- Full name: Paulo Renato Rebocho Ferreira
- Date of birth: 18 January 1979 (age 47)
- Place of birth: Cascais, Portugal
- Height: 1.83 m (6 ft 0 in)
- Position: Full-back

Team information
- Current team: Sporting CP (assistant)

Youth career
- 1989–1990: Alcabideche
- 1992–1996: Dramático Cascais
- 1996–1997: Estoril

Senior career*
Years	Team	Apps	(Gls)
1997–2000	Estoril	36	(2)
2000–2002	Vitória Setúbal	67	(2)
2002–2004	Porto	62	(0)
2004–2013	Chelsea	141	(0)
Total		306	(4)

International career
2000	Portugal U20	6	(0)
2000–2002	Portugal U21	21	(0)
2002	Portugal B	2	(0)
2002–2010	Portugal	62	(0)

Managerial career
- 2023–2024: Lille (assistant)
- 2024: AC Milan (assistant)
- 2025–2026: Lyon (assistant)
- 2026–: Sporting CP (assistant)
Medal record
Men's football
Representing Portugal
UEFA European Championship
Runner-up	2004 Portugal
- * Club domestic league appearances and goals

Paulo Renato Rebocho Ferreira OIH (Portuguese pronunciation: [ˈpawlu fɨˈʁɐjɾɐ]; born 18 January 1979) is a Portuguese former professional footballer who played as a full-back.

After starting out at Estoril, he went on to spend the vast majority of his 16-year career with Porto and Chelsea, signing with the latter in 2004 for €20 million. He won several major titles with both clubs, including two Primeira Liga titles, three Premier League trophies and the 2004 and 2012 editions of the Champions League.

Ferreira earned 62 caps for the Portugal national team between 2002 and 2010, playing at two European Championships and two World Cups and finishing as runner-up at Euro 2004.

== Club career ==
=== Early career ===
Born in Cascais, Lisbon District, Ferreira started his career in the Segunda Liga with Estoril. In the following two seasons he was relatively played, representing the club in both that and the third divisions.

Ferreira signed with Vitória de Setúbal for 2000–01, scoring two goals in 33 games during the campaign to help his team promote to the Primeira Liga after finishing in third place. His first appearance in the competition took place on 13 August 2001, in a 3–1 away loss against Marítimo.

=== Porto ===
Ferreira moved to Porto in the summer of 2002, signed by coach José Mourinho who converted him from right midfielder to right-back. He only missed two league games over his two-year stint, as the club won back-to-back national championships.

Ferreira was also in the starting XI in the 2003 UEFA Cup final against Celtic in Seville (which ended with a 3–2 win), that year's 1–0 defeat of União de Leiria in the Taça de Portugal which meant the conquest of the treble and the 2004 UEFA Champions League final, won against Monaco.

=== Chelsea ===
On 22 June 2004, Ferreira joined Chelsea for €20 million (£13.2 million), reuniting at Stamford Bridge with both Mourinho and former Porto teammate Ricardo Carvalho, both of whom were also signed in the off-season. He impressed greatly in his first year, appearing in 42 competitive matches and helping to the Premier League title after a 50-year wait.

Ferreira scored his first competitive goal for the Blues on 19 February 2006, in a 3–1 home victory over Colchester United in the FA Cup's fifth round. On 30 April, as his team wrapped up a second successive league title with a 3–0 win over Manchester United, his tackle on Wayne Rooney fractured the England striker's metatarsal and jeopardised his chance's of going to June's World Cup. Rooney admitted in 2022 that this injury was caused in part by his choice to wear longer studs on his boots, ironically in order to hurt others.

In 2006–07, Ferreira lost his importance in the squad, first being overtaken in his position by Khalid Boulahrouz and then midfielders Lassana Diarra and Geremi; he did play the full 120 minutes of the 1–0 FA Cup win against Manchester United on 19 May 2007, the first final to be played at the new Wembley.

In 2007–08, Ferreira played second-fiddle to Juliano Belletti and Michael Essien. He signed a new five-year deal with Chelsea on 18 February 2008, switching from jersey #20 to #19 at the start of the following season following Deco's arrival.

On 23 September 2009, following a lengthy injury lay-off, Ferreira returned to action in a League Cup match against Queens Park Rangers. On 2 December, in the same competition, he scored his last goal for the Londoners, a late equaliser in extra time of the quarter-finals at Blackburn Rovers which ended in a penalty shootout loss.

Following physical problems that afflicted José Bosingwa, Ashley Cole and Branislav Ivanović, Ferreira was given a more consistent role as a starter as Yuri Zhirkov featured in the other defensive wing, most significantly in the 7–1 rout of Aston Villa and the 2–1 victory at Manchester United. He still contributed 20 official appearances, helping his team to win the double.

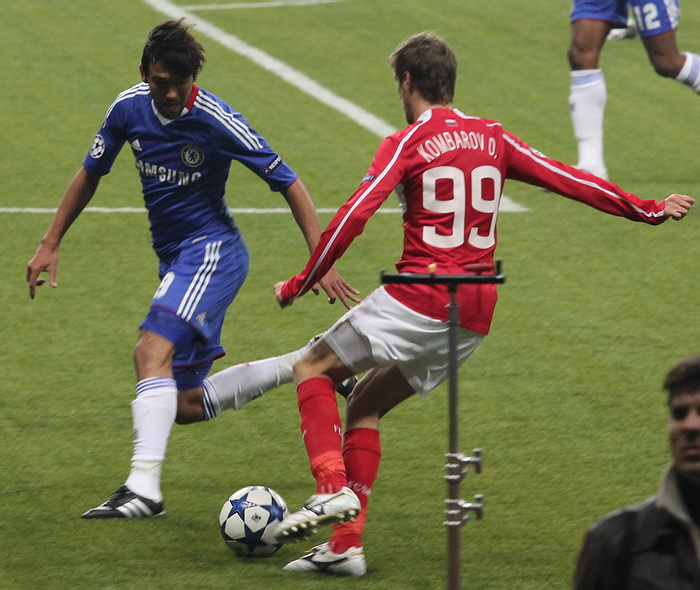
Ferreira challenging Dmitriy Kombarov of Spartak Moscow in the 2010–11 Champions League

Ferreira appeared in his 200th game for Chelsea on 20 April 2011, playing the entire 3–1 home win against Birmingham City. He was once described by Mourinho as "a player who will never be Player of the match but will always score 7/10 for his individual display".

Ferreira featured often under Carlo Ancelotti but, after his sacking and his replacement with André Villas-Boas, found it hard to find a place in the squad as the latter manager opted for a younger squad in detriment of several veterans. His first game of the 2011–12 campaign was on 21 September 2011, on a penalty shootout win over Fulham in the League Cup. His first league appearance occurred on 22 December, after coming on for injured Ivanović in a 1–1 draw away to Tottenham Hotspur; in the final minutes of that match, he suffered a fractured cheekbone in a clash with Gareth Bale.

On 27 March 2012, in his first UEFA Champions League start of the season, Ferreira had another solid defensive performance to help Chelsea defeat Benfica 1–0 at the Estádio da Luz. and eventually win the quarter-final tie 3–1. On 19 May, he was an unused substitute in the final against Bayern Munich.

Ferreira's contract ran through the summer of 2013, and both player and club confirmed that they would not renew it upon its expiration. He made his last appearance in a league fixture with Everton on 19 May 2013, coming on as a late substitute to a round of applause as the 2–1 win secured the hosts a spot in the Champions League group stage. Afterwards, teammate Frank Lampard addressed the crowd and praised the 34-year-old defender, who announced he was retiring from professional football and thanked the fans for their continued support; over nine seasons, he appeared in 217 official games.

== International career ==
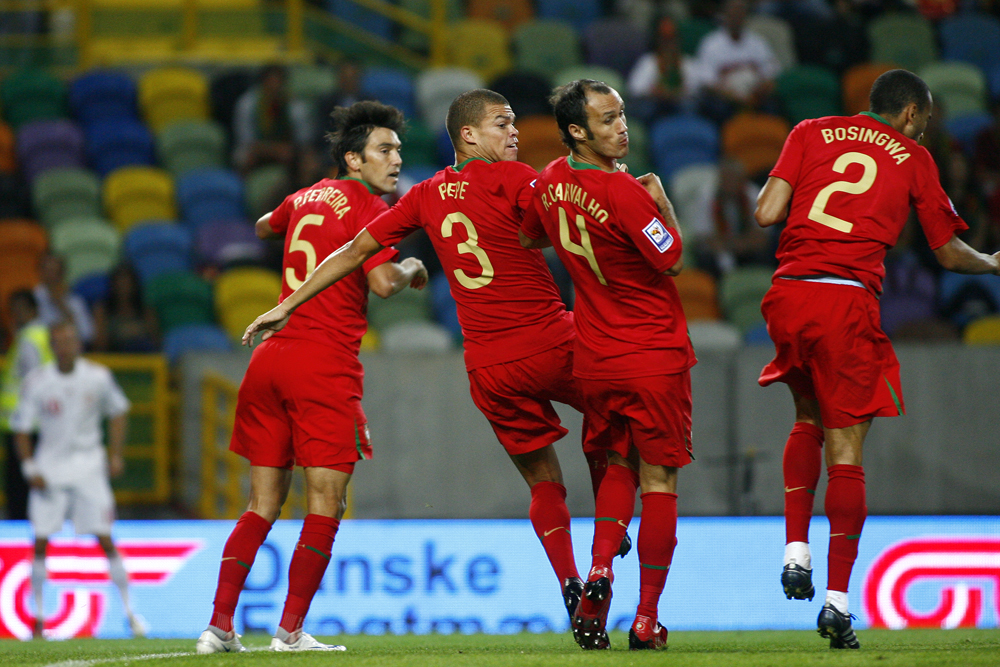
Portuguese defensive wall (from left to right: Ferreira, Pepe, Ricardo Carvalho and José Bosingwa)

Between the Portuguese under-20 and under-21 sides, Ferreira appeared in a total of 27 matches. He made his debut for the full side on 7 September 2002, playing the second half of a 1–1 friendly draw with England at Villa Park.

Ferreira was selected by coach Luiz Felipe Scolari for the UEFA Euro 2004 tournament. He started their opening match against Greece, but a series of mistakes in the 1–2 loss saw him dropped for Miguel for the rest of the tournament. Following an injury to the latter late into the first half of the final, however, he returned to action in another defeat to the same opponent, now 1–0.

Ferreira made two appearances for Portugal in the 2006 World Cup: in the 0–1 semi-final loss against France, he replaced injured Miguel during the second half, and started the third place play-off against the host country Germany (1–3 defeat). Subsequently, he faced competition from Bosingwa and Miguel for the right-back slot, and was often deployed at the opposite flank following the retirement of Nuno Valente.

Ferreira was named in the squad for the Euro 2008. He started all four games as a left-back, in an eventual quarter-final exit.

A regular in the 2010 World Cup qualifying phase, Ferreira would then be included in the 23-men squad to represent the Selecção in the finals. He only played the opening game in South Africa, a goalless draw to the Ivory Coast.

On 30 August 2010, Ferreira announced he would be also retiring from the national team, shortly after Simão Sabrosa did.

== Post-retirement ==
After retiring, Ferreira worked for Chelsea as an ambassador and assistant loan player technical coach. On 5 July 2023, he was appointed assistant manager at French Ligue 1 club Lille, joining his compatriot Paulo Fonseca's staff.

The pair continued working together subsequently, at AC Milan, Lyon and Sporting CP.

== Career statistics ==
=== Club ===
Appearances and goals by club, season and competition
Club	Season	League			National Cup		League Cup		Europe		Other		Total	
Club	Season	Division	Apps	Goals	Apps	Goals	Apps	Goals	Apps	Goals	Apps	Goals	Apps	Goals
Estoril	1997–98	Segunda Liga	0	0	0	0	–		–		–		0	0
Estoril	1998–99	Segunda Liga	15	0	0	0	–		–		–		15	0
Estoril	1999–2000	Segunda Divisão	21	2	1	1	–		–		–		22	3
Estoril	Total		36	2	1	1	0	0	0	0	0	0	37	3
Vitória Setúbal	2000–01	Segunda Liga	33	2	2	0	–		–		–		35	2
Vitória Setúbal	2001–02	Primeira Liga	34	0 (Note: Fora De Jogo has one goal scored – match report disagrees: https://maisfutebol.iol.pt/geral/vitoria-setubal/maritimo-v-setubal-3-1-destaques)	2	0	–		–		–		36	0
Vitória Setúbal	Total		67	2	4	0	0	0	0	0	0	0	71	2
Porto	2002–03	Primeira Liga	30	0	5	0	–		12	0	–		47	0
Porto	2003–04	Primeira Liga	32	0	5	0	–		13	0	2 (Note: One appearance in UEFA Super Cup, one appearance in Supertaça Cândido de Oliveira)	0	52	0
Porto	Total		62	0	10	0	0	0	25	0	2	0	99	0
Chelsea	2004–05	Premier League	29	0	1	0	5	0	7	0	–		42	0
Chelsea	2005–06	Premier League	21	0	3	1	1	0	6	0	1 (Note: Appearance in FA Community Shield)	0	32	1
Chelsea	2006–07	Premier League	24	0	5	0	2	0	6	0	1	0	38	0
Chelsea	2007–08	Premier League	18	0	3	0	2	0	5	0	–		28	0
Chelsea	2008–09	Premier League	7	0	1	0	2	0	2	0	–		12	0
Chelsea	2009–10	Premier League	13	0	4	0	3	1	0	0	–		20	1
Chelsea	2010–11	Premier League	21	0	1	0	1	0	5	0	1	0	29	0
Chelsea	2011–12	Premier League	6	0	0	0	1	0	2	0	–		9	0
Chelsea	2012–13	Premier League	2	0	1	0	1	0	2	0	1 (Note: Appearance in FIFA Club World Cup)	0	7	0
Chelsea	Total		141	0	19	1	18	1	35	0	4	0	217	2
Career total			306	4	34	2	18	1	60	0	6	0	424	7

=== International ===
Appearances and goals by national team and year
National team	Year	Apps	Goals
Portugal	2002	2	0
Portugal	2003	6	0
Portugal	2004	11	0
Portugal	2005	9	0
Portugal	2006	7	0
Portugal	2007	9	0
Portugal	2008	11	0
Portugal	2009	3	0
Portugal	2010	4	0
Total		62	0

== Honours ==
Porto

- Primeira Liga: 2002–03, 2003–04
- Taça de Portugal: 2002–03
- Supertaça Cândido de Oliveira: 2003
- UEFA Champions League: 2003–04
- UEFA Cup: 2002–03

Chelsea

- Premier League: 2004–05, 2005–06, 2009–10
- FA Cup: 2006–07, 2008–09, 2009–10, 2011–12
- Football League Cup: 2004–05, 2006–07
- FA Community Shield: 2005
- UEFA Champions League: 2011–12
- UEFA Europa League: 2012–13

Portugal

- UEFA European Championship runner-up: 2004

Individual

- UEFA Team of the Year: 2002–03
- ESM Team of the Year: 2003–04

Orders

- Medal of Merit, Order of the Immaculate Conception of Vila Viçosa (House of Braganza)
