= Marco Vanzini =

Uruguayan footballer (born 1976)

Personal information
- Full name: Marco Eduardo Vanzini Casteres
- Date of birth: 19 April 1976 (age 50)
- Place of birth: Montevideo, Uruguay
- Height: 1.86 m (6 ft 1 in)
- Position: Midfielder

Senior career*
Years	Team	Apps	(Gls)
1995–1996	Danubio	18	(3)
1997	Banfield	3	(0)
1998–2003	Nacional	106	(13)
2003–2004	Braga	24	(0)
2004–2005	Terrassa	22	(0)
2005–2007	Nacional	26	(2)
2007	Juventude	12	(2)
2007–2009	Al-Hilal		
Total		211	(20)

International career
1995–1996	Uruguay	3	(0)
- * Club domestic league appearances and goals

Marco Eduardo Vanzini Casteres (born 19 April 1976) is a Uruguayan former footballer who played as a defensive midfielder.

== Club career ==
In his country Vanzini represented hometown sides Danubio F.C. and Club Nacional de Football, playing in two different spells for the latter and winning a total of five first division championships. Nicknamed Palillo, he first joined Nacional in 1988, and he made his last appearance for the club in 2007.

Abroad, his first experience came in 1996, playing a couple of months with Argentina's Club Atlético Banfield. From 2003 to 2005 different fates befell him, as he helped Portuguese team S.C. Braga finish fifth and qualify for the UEFA Cup, subsequently relegating in Spain with second level's Terrassa FC.

After two more years at Nacional, Vanzini played briefly in Brazil for Esporte Clube Juventude (top division, relegation) at age 31. He retired in 2009 at the age of 33, after two seasons in Saudi Arabia with Al-Hilal FC.

== International career ==
During one year, in the beginning of his professional career, Vanzini made three appearances for Uruguay, his debut coming in 1995.
