= Maniche =

Portuguese footballer (born 1977)

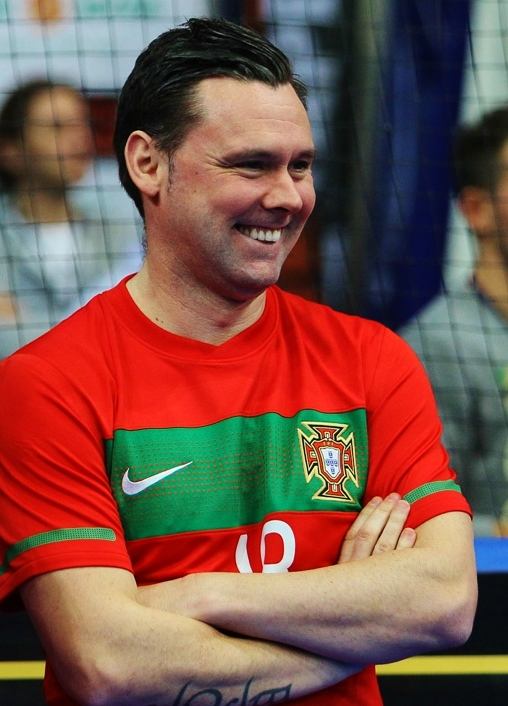
- Maniche in 2015

Personal information
- Full name: Nuno Ricardo de Oliveira Ribeiro
- Date of birth: 11 November 1977 (age 48)
- Place of birth: Lisbon, Portugal
- Height: 1.73 m (5 ft 8 in)
- Position: Central midfielder

Youth career
- 1989–1996: Benfica

Senior career*
Years	Team	Apps	(Gls)
1995–1996	Benfica	0	(0)
1996–1999	Alverca	78	(10)
1999–2002	Benfica	54	(11)
2002	Benfica B	1	(0)
2002–2005	Porto	80	(16)
2005–2006	Dynamo Moscow	12	(2)
2006	→ Chelsea (loan)	8	(0)
2006–2009	Atlético Madrid	64	(7)
2008	→ Inter Milan (loan)	8	(1)
2009–2010	1. FC Köln	26	(2)
2010–2011	Sporting CP	17	(1)
Total		348	(50)

International career
1993	Portugal U15	4	(0)
1995–1996	Portugal U17	4	(0)
1995–1996	Portugal U18	8	(2)
1998	Portugal U20	1	(0)
1997–1999	Portugal U21	10	(0)
2000	Portugal B	2	(0)
2003–2009	Portugal	52	(7)

Managerial career
- 2013: Paços Ferreira (assistant)
- 2016: Académica (assistant)
Medal record
Men's football
Representing Portugal
UEFA European Championship
Runner-up	2004 Portugal
- * Club domestic league appearances and goals

Nuno Ricardo de Oliveira Ribeiro OIH (born 11 November 1977), known as Maniche (European Portuguese: [maˈniʃ]), is a Portuguese former professional footballer who played as a central midfielder.

He played top-flight football in Portugal, Russia, England, Spain, Italy and Germany, and in 2004 he helped Porto to the Champions League, one of eight trophies won with that club. He amassed Primeira Liga totals of 177 matches and 31 goals in seven seasons.

Maniche won 52 caps for Portugal, representing the nation at Euro 2004 and the 2006 World Cup and finishing runner-up in the former competition.

== Club career ==
=== Benfica and Porto ===
Born in Lisbon, Maniche played youth football for local S.L. Benfica. After three seasons with neighbouring F.C. Alverca, who acted as the former's farm team, he returned to Benfica, where he was initially deployed as a winger.

Following disciplinary problems at Benfica, Maniche was signed by José Mourinho for FC Porto. The manager made him a key member of his sides, reconverting him to central midfielder.

Maniche enjoyed a successful period at Porto, winning both the UEFA Cup in 2003 and the UEFA Champions League in 2004 and contributing 13 goals in 60 matches as the club also managed back-to-back Primeira Liga titles. He was chosen Man of the match in the 2004 Intercontinental Cup, which his team won on penalties against Once Caldas of Colombia.

=== Dynamo and Chelsea ===
Maniche was sold to FC Dynamo Moscow in May 2005, for €16 million; he was accompanied in that adventure by Porto teammates Giourkas Seitaridis and Costinha (another club player, Derlei, had left for the Russian team in January). Unsettled, as were the vast majority of foreign players bought by new owner Alexey Fedorychev, he left in January 2006 on loan to Premier League side Chelsea.

Maniche was part of Chelsea's 2006 league-winning squad. In his first start, a home game against West Ham United on 9 April, he had an opportunity to score an equaliser from six yards out but smashed his shot against the crossbar, and was shown an immediate red card in the 17th minute for a challenge on Lionel Scaloni; nevertheless, they went on to win 4–1.

However, Maniche did not make enough appearances in the league to earn a winners' medal, challenged for a central midfield place by Michael Essien, Frank Lampard and Claude Makélélé. Chelsea had the option of making the transfer permanent at the end of the season, for £5 million (US$9 million), but the player eventually returned to Dynamo Moscow.

=== Atlético Madrid ===
Maniche was signed by Atlético Madrid in late August 2006. Partnering his compatriots Costinha and Zé Castro, he scored four goals in 28 La Liga matches in his first season in a seventh-place finish.

Following a run-in with Atlético coach, Javier Aguirre, Maniche was cut from the squad, and agreed to join Inter Milan on a January loan, running for the second part of 2007–08. Splitting time between the bench and the starting eleven in eight Serie A appearances, he managed to score one goal, in a 1–2 home defeat to Juventus FC on 22 March, also hitting the post in stoppage time.

In July 2008, Maniche returned to Atlético Madrid, playing a major part in the Colchoneros' early season as they had returned to the UEFA Champions League after a 12-year absence. In late February 2009, however, he was ousted after a new quarrel with the management, now led by former club player Abel Resino.

According to additional reports in the Spanish press, Maniche was deemed surplus to requirements in Madrid after he rejected the club's offer of a new deal, as his contract was going to expire on 30 June 2009.

"We informed Maniche three or four weeks ago that we wanted to renew his contract", said Atlético's general manager Miguel Ángel Gil Marín."

"We really wanted him to accept the conditions and sign the contract. It is a shame for us."

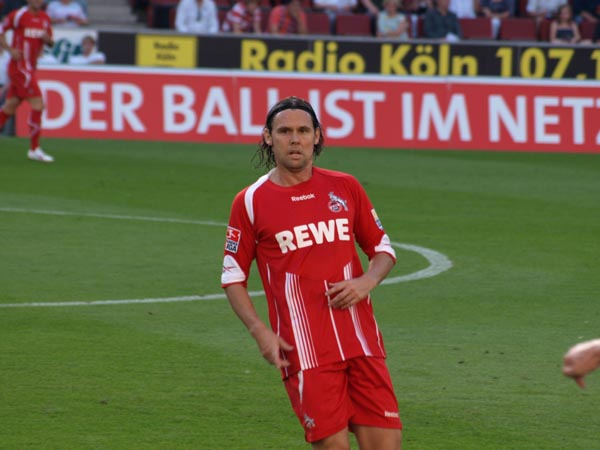
Maniche in action for 1. FC Köln in 2009

Maniche was released on 6 May 2009.

=== 1. FC Köln ===
On 20 July 2009, Maniche moved to the Bundesliga with 1. FC Köln, signing a two-year deal and rejoining former Benfica and Portugal teammate Petit. He scored the first of his three goals on 27 October, closing the 3–0 away victory over SV Eintracht Trier 05 in the last 16 of the DFB-Pokal.

=== Return to Portugal ===
Maniche left after only one season in Germany, and on 16 June 2010 he returned to his native country, signing a one-year deal (plus an option for two further seasons) with the club he still had not represented in the Portuguese Big Three, Sporting CP. Frequently injured during his spell with the Lions and vastly underperforming, the 33-year-old terminated his contract by mutual consent – even though he had automatically renewed it in December after appearing in his 20th competitive game– on 6 July 2011; in May of the following year, not being able to find a new team, he decided to retire.

On 12 June 2013, Maniche was appointed as assistant at F.C. Paços de Ferreira after his former Porto and international teammate Costinha was hired as the manager. Three years later, he was hired in the same role alongside the same boss at Segunda Liga side Académica de Coimbra, but left four months later for personal reasons.

== International career ==
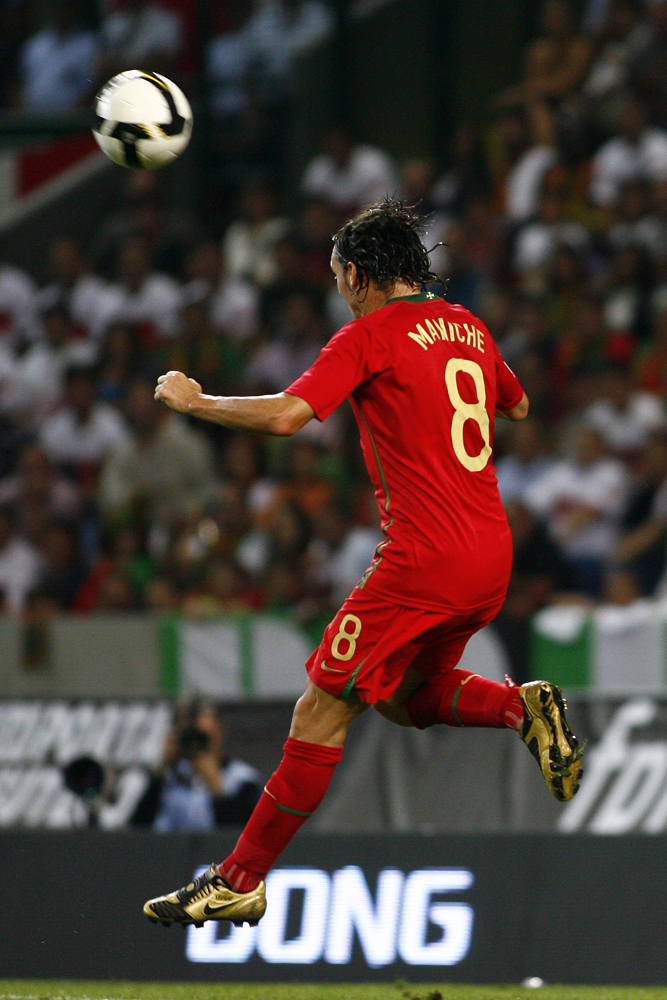
Maniche playing for Portugal in 2009

Maniche made his debut for the Portugal national team on 29 March 2003, in a 2–1 friendly win over Brazil. He was a key element in the country's runner-up run at UEFA Euro 2004, scoring in a 2–0 group stage defeat of Russia and adding another in the semi-finals against the Netherlands, which ended in a 2–1 victory; he was subsequently selected for the Team of the Tournament.

On 21 June 2006, in the 2006 FIFA World Cup, Portugal played Mexico in the final group fixture. Maniche netted in the sixth minute in an eventual 2–1 win that sealed the group win. Four days later, in the round of 16, as the national side faced the Netherlands once again, he scored the only goal of the game, and was the only Portuguese player to feature on Adidas' Golden Ball shortlist.

After appearing significantly during the qualifying stages for Euro 2008, he was surprisingly left out of the nation's final squad, although younger brother Jorge Ribeiro would make the final cut. He also featured little during the qualification for the 2010 World Cup, and was subsequently left out of the squad for the final stages by manager Carlos Queiroz.

== Style of play ==
Known for his teamwork, stamina and powerful shot, Maniche received his nickname after Benfica's 1980s Danish forward Michael Manniche.

== Personal life ==
Jorge Ribeiro, Maniche's younger brother, was also a footballer. Mainly a left midfielder, he also represented Benfica amongst many other clubs, and the two were teammates at Dynamo Moscow.

== Career statistics ==
=== Club ===
Appearances and goals by club, season and competition
Club	Season	League			National cup		League cup		Europe		Other		Total	
Club	Season	Division	Apps	Goals	Apps	Goals	Apps	Goals	Apps	Goals	Apps	Goals	Apps	Goals
Benfica	1995–96	Primeira Liga	0	0	0	0	–		2	0	–		2	0
Alverca	1996–97	Segunda Liga	23	2	1	0	–		–		–		24	2
Alverca	1997–98	Segunda Liga	29	5	1	1	–		–		–		30	6
Alverca	1998–99	Primeira Liga	26	3	1	1	–		–		–		27	4
Alverca	Total		78	10	3	2	0	0	0	0	0	0	81	12
Benfica	1999–00	Primeira Liga	28	10	1	1	–		6	1	–		35	12
Benfica	2000–01	Primeira Liga	26	1	4	1	–		2	0	–		32	2
Benfica	2001–02	Primeira Liga	0	0	0	0	–		0	0	–		0	0
Benfica	Total		54	11	5	2	0	0	8	1	0	0	67	14
Porto	2002–03	Primeira Liga	29	6	3	1	–		12	2	–		44	9
Porto	2003–04	Primeira Liga	31	7	5	1	–		12	3	2 (Note: One appearance in Supertaça Cândido de Oliveira, one appearance in UEFA Super Cup)	0	50	11
Porto	2004–05	Primeira Liga	20	3	0	0	–		8	0	2 (Note: One appearance in UEFA Super Cup, one appearance in Intercontinental Cup)	0	30	3
Porto	Total		80	16	8	2	0	0	32	5	4	0	124	23
Dynamo Moscow	2005	Russian Premier League	12	2	0	0	–		0	0	–		12	2
Chelsea	2005–06	Premier League	8	0	0	0	3	0	0	0	–		11	0
Atlético Madrid	2006–07	La Liga	28	4	2	0	–		0	0	–		30	4
Atlético Madrid	2007–08	La Liga	15	2	0	0	–		7 (Note: Five appearances in UEFA Cup, two appearances in UEFA Intertoto Cup)	0	–		22	2
Atlético Madrid	Total		43	6	2	0	0	0	7	0	0	0	52	6
Inter Milan	2007–08	Serie A	8	1	3	0	–		0	0	–		11	1
Atlético Madrid	2008–09	La Liga	21	1	2	0	–		9	1	–		32	2
1. FC Köln	2009–10	Bundesliga	26	2	4	1	–		0	0	–		30	3
Sporting CP	2010–11	Primeira Liga	17	1	1	0	0	0	9	3	–		27	3
Career total			347	50	28	4	3	0	65	10	4	0	449	64

=== International ===
Appearances and goals by national team and year
National team	Year	Apps	Goals
Portugal	2003	7	0
Portugal	2004	13	3
Portugal	2005	7	0
Portugal	2006	12	3
Portugal	2007	6	1
Portugal	2008	5	0
Portugal	2009	2	0
Total		52	7

Scores and results list Portugal's goal tally first, score column indicates score after each Maniche goal.

List of international goals scored by Maniche
No.	Date	Venue	Opponent	Score	Result	Competition
1	16 June 2004	Estádio da Luz, Lisbon, Portugal	Russia	1–0	2–0	UEFA Euro 2004
2	30 June 2004	Estádio José Alvalade, Lisbon, Portugal	Netherlands	2–0	2–1	UEFA Euro 2004
3	17 November 2004	Stade Josy Barthel, Luxembourg City, Luxembourg	Luxembourg	3–0	5–0	2006 World Cup qualification
4	1 March 2006	Esprit Arena, Düsseldorf, Germany	Saudi Arabia	2–0	3–0	Friendly
5	21 June 2006	Veltins-Arena, Gelsenkirchen, Germany	Mexico	1–0	2–1	2006 FIFA World Cup
6	25 June 2006	Frankenstadion, Nuremberg, Germany	Netherlands	1–0	1–0	2006 FIFA World Cup
7	8 September 2007	Estádio da Luz, Lisbon, Portugal	Poland	1–1	2–2	Euro 2008 qualifying

== Honours ==
Porto

- Primeira Liga: 2002–03, 2003–04
- Taça de Portugal: 2002–03
- Supertaça Cândido de Oliveira: 2003
- UEFA Champions League: 2003–04
- UEFA Cup: 2002–03
- Intercontinental Cup: 2004

Inter Milan

- Serie A: 2007–08

Portugal

- UEFA European Championship runner-up: 2004

Individual

- FIFA World Cup All-Star Team: 2006
- UEFA European Championship Team of the Tournament: 2004
- UEFA Team of the Year: 2004
- Intercontinental Cup Man of the Match: 2004

Orders

- Medal of Merit, Order of the Immaculate Conception of Vila Viçosa (House of Braganza)
