= Costinha =

Portuguese footballer (born 1974)

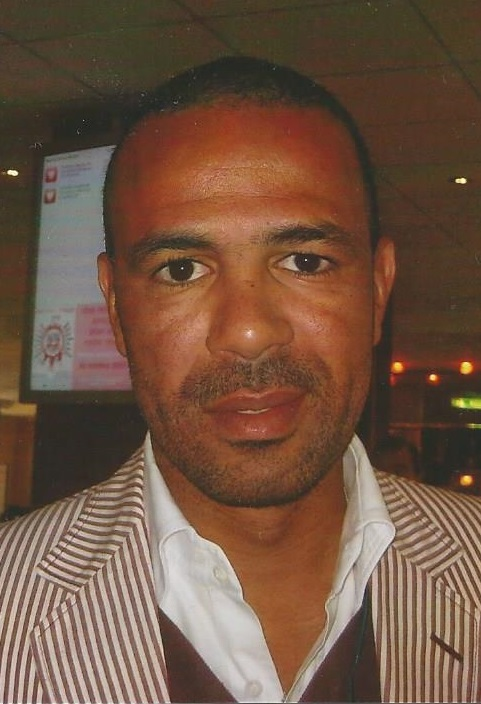
- Costinha in 2012

Personal information
- Full name: Francisco José Rodrigues da Costa
- Date of birth: 1 December 1974 (age 51)
- Place of birth: Lisbon, Portugal
- Height: 1.81 m (5 ft 11 in)
- Position: Defensive midfielder

Team information
- Current team: Oriental (manager)

Youth career
- 1987–1993: Oriental

Senior career*
Years	Team	Apps	(Gls)
1993–1995	Oriental	32	(3)
1995–1996	Machico	30	(5)
1996–1997	Nacional	30	(4)
1997–2001	Monaco	84	(3)
2001–2005	Porto	109	(13)
2005–2006	Dynamo Moscow	10	(0)
2006–2007	Atlético Madrid	24	(0)
2007–2010	Atalanta	1	(0)
Total		320	(28)

International career
1998–2006	Portugal	53	(2)

Managerial career
- 2013: Beira-Mar
- 2013: Paços Ferreira
- 2016–2017: Académica
- 2017–2019: Nacional
- 2021: Nacional
- 2026–: Oriental
Medal record
Men's football
Representing Portugal
UEFA European Championship
Runner-up	2004 Portugal
Bronze medal – third place	2000 Belgium-Netherlands
- * Club domestic league appearances and goals

Francisco José Rodrigues da Costa OIH (born 1 December 1974), known as Costinha (Portuguese pronunciation: [kɔʃˈtiɲɐ]), is a Portuguese former professional footballer who played as a defensive midfielder. He is currently manager of Oriental.

Best known for his tackling and positioning, as well as his athleticism, stamina and workrate, he played for clubs in Portugal, France, Russia, Spain and Italy. He won eight trophies with Porto, including the 2004 Champions League.

Costinha played more than 50 times with Portugal, appearing with the national team in one World Cup and two European Championships and being part of the squad that reached the final in Euro 2004. After retiring, he worked as a manager for Beira-Mar, Paços Ferreira, Académica and Nacional.

== Club career ==
=== Early career ===
Costinha was born in Lisbon to an Angolan father, who had immigrated to the Portuguese capital in the 1960s. A childhood Sporting CP fan, he began his career in the third division with Clube Oriental de Lisboa, A.D. Machico and C.D. Nacional.

=== Monaco ===
In the summer of 1997, Costinha signed a five-year contract with La Liga's Valencia CF, but backed out when manager Jorge Valdano wanted to loan him to Villarreal CF; he then caught the interest of French club AS Monaco FC who acquired him through the influence of agent Jorge Mendes. After a tentative first season he became an important first-team member, helping with 28 matches and one goal to the 1999–2000 conquest of the Ligue 1 championship; he was part of a talented side which ousted Manchester United from the UEFA Champions League in 1998, on the away goals rule.

=== Porto ===
Costinha joined FC Porto on a five-year deal in May 2001, and made his Primeira Liga debut on 12 August aged nearly 27; he was sent off in a 1–0 loss away to Sporting. He went on to be an instrumental midfield element in the northerners' two consecutive national championships. On 9 March 2004, he scored against and effectively knocked out Manchester United in the Champions League round of 16; Porto went on to win the title, beating his former side Monaco 3–0 in the final.

=== Later career ===
Again a starter throughout most of the 2004–05 campaign, Costinha was sold to FC Dynamo Moscow in May 2005 for €4 million alongside teammates Maniche and Giourkas Seitaridis, following Derlei who left in January. The following month, he was suspended after an incident in a training camp in Israel. Unsettled, he moved to Atlético Madrid on a two-year contract ahead of 2006–07.

Costinha was released by the Spaniards in August 2007, joining Atalanta BC of Serie A, where he appeared very rarely throughout his spell – only one match, in his first season – due to serious injuries and later because he was not considered fit to play competitively, despite him having the highest salary in the first team (€700,000 per year, in a contract due to expire in June 2010). The club tried to agree a mutual termination of the contract with him, and also attempted unsuccessfully to rescind it through the Italian Football League.

== International career ==
Costinha made his debut for Portugal on 14 October 1998, in a 3–0 home win over Slovakia for the UEFA Euro 2000 qualifiers; he entered as a 67th-minute substitute in place of Rui Costa. He was selected for the final stages, where he scored an injury time header against Romania (same score).

He also played at Euro 2004 and the 2006 FIFA World Cup tournaments. During the latter, on 25 June, he took part in the Battle of Nuremberg, being one of four players sent off in the 1–0 round-of-16 victory over the Netherlands after two bookable offences, the second being a handball.

Costinha finished his international career with 53 caps and two goals, having been rarely called during the Euro 2008 qualifying stage.

== Coaching career ==
=== Director ===
On 23 February 2010, the 35-year-old Costinha left Atalanta by mutual consent. He immediately retired, being named shortly afterwards as Sporting's director of football, succeeding the sacked Ricardo Sá Pinto, his former international teammate. On 9 February 2011, the day after an interview to Sport TV in which he criticised the club's board of directors, he was dismissed.

In June 2011, in the same capacity, Costinha joined Servette FC, with the Swiss team being managed by countryman João Alves. It was reported that the pair did not see eye to eye on certain issues, and in November 2011, Alves was relieved of his duties and replaced by João Carlos Pereira. The team's results worsened under Pereira and in April 2012, both Pereira and Costinha were fired, with Alves being reinstated as manager; Costinha reportedly contested the terms of his removal, claiming that his contract extended until June 2013.

=== Beira-Mar, Paços Ferreira and Académica ===
Costinha was hired as manager of S.C. Beira-Mar on 18 February 2013, replacing Ulisses Morais. His debut five days later was a 1–0 defeat at Vitória de Setúbal. He left the club on 22 May, after its top-flight relegation.

On 12 June 2013, Costinha was appointed at fellow top-tier F.C. Paços de Ferreira, who had made the qualifying rounds of the Champions League for the first time in their history; his midfield partner for Portugal and three teams, Maniche, was hired as assistant. Costinha was sacked after only four months, however, due to poor results.

Costinha took over at Académica de Coimbra, recently relegated from the top division, on 20 June 2016. Maniche again assisted him, until leaving for personal reasons in October.

=== Nacional ===
On 30 May 2017, Costinha was appointed as manager of Nacional. In his first year, they were promoted back to the top tier as champions.

Costinha left a year later by mutual consent, due to the Madeira team's relegation as second-bottom. Negative highlights included a 10–0 loss against eventual champions S.L. Benfica, on 10 February 2019.

Costinha returned to Nacional – again relegated from the main division – on 28 June 2021, on a one-year deal. He left on 20 September, having achieved a win and a draw in five games.

== Career statistics ==
=== Club ===
Appearances and goals by club, season and competition
Club	Season	League			National cup		League cup		Continental		Total	
Club	Season	Division	Apps	Goals	Apps	Goals	Apps	Goals	Apps	Goals	Apps	Goals
Monaco	1997–98	Ligue 1	11	0								
Monaco	1998–99	Ligue 1	21	2								
Monaco	1999–00	Ligue 1	28	1								
Monaco	2000–01	Ligue 1	24	0								
Monaco	Total		94	3								
Porto	2001–02	Primeira Liga	29	3								
Porto	2002–03	Primeira Liga	23	5								
Porto	2003–04	Primeira Liga	27	2								
Porto	2004–05	Primeira Liga	30	3								
Porto	Total		109	13								
Dynamo Moscow	2005	Russian Premier League	10	0								
Atlético Madrid	2006–07	La Liga	24	0								
Atalanta	2007–08	Serie A	1	0	0	0	-	-	-	-	1	0
Atalanta	2008–09	Serie A	0	0	0	0	-	-	-	-	0	0
Atalanta	2009–10	Serie A	0	0	0	0	-	-	-	-	0	0
Atalanta	Total		1	0	0	0	0	0	0	0	1	0
Career total			238	16								

=== International ===
Appearances and goals by national team and year
National team	Year	Apps	Goals
Portugal	1998	1	0
Portugal	1999	0	0
Portugal	2000	8	1
Portugal	2001	1	0
Portugal	2002	2	1
Portugal	2003	8	0
Portugal	2004	15	0
Portugal	2005	6	0
Portugal	2006	12	0
Total		53	2

Scores and results list Portugal's goal tally first, score column indicates score after each Costinha goal.

List of international goals scored by Costinha
No.	Date	Venue	Opponent	Score	Result	Competition
1	17 June 2000	GelreDome, Arnhem, Netherlands	Romania	1–0	1–0	UEFA Euro 2000
2	7 September 2002	Villa Park, Birmingham, England	England	1–1	1–1	Friendly

== Managerial statistics ==
As of 16 May 2019

Team	From	To	Record							
Team	From	To	G	W	D	L	GF	GA	GD	Win %
Beira-Mar	2013	2013	11	2	2	7	12	18	−6	18.18
Paços Ferreira	2013	2013	14	2	2	10	15	31	−16	14.29
Académica	2016	2017	48	20	13	15	48	38	+10	41.67
Nacional	2017	2019	81	29	22	30	123	140	−17	35.80
Career totals			154	53	62	39	198	227	−29	34.42

== Honours ==
=== Player ===
Monaco

- Ligue 1: 1999–2000
- Trophée des Champions: 1997, 2000

Porto

- Primeira Liga: 2002–03, 2003–04
- Taça de Portugal: 2002–03
- Supertaça Cândido de Oliveira: 2003, 2004
- UEFA Champions League: 2003–04
- UEFA Cup: 2002–03
- Intercontinental Cup: 2004

Portugal

- UEFA European Championship runner-up: 2004

=== Manager ===
Nacional

- LigaPro: 2017–18

=== Orders ===
- Medal of Merit, Order of the Immaculate Conception of Vila Viçosa (House of Braganza)
