= Maciel (footballer, born 1978) =

Brazilian footballer

Personal information
- Full name: Maciel Lima Barbosa da Cunha
- Date of birth: 29 November 1978 (age 47)
- Place of birth: Caxias, Brazil
- Height: 1.72 m (5 ft 8 in)
- Position: Forward

Youth career
- –1997: Cruzeiro
- 1998: Guarani-MG
- 1999: Capivariano

Senior career*
Years	Team	Apps	(Gls)
1999	Ituano		
1999	União São João		
1999	Botafogo-PB		
2000	Bangu		
2001	Volta Redonda		
2001−2004	União Leiria	72	(26)
2004−2007	Porto	19	(3)
2005	→ Paranaense (loan)	3	(0)
2005–2006	→ União Leiria (loan)	31	(5)
2006−2007	→ Braga (loan)	19	(2)
2007−2008	União Leiria	8	(0)
2008−2009	Skoda Xanthi	4	(0)
2009	Cabofriense	5	(0)
2009	Angra dos Reis		
2010	Volta Redonda	12	(4)
2010−2011	Madureira	10	(6)
2011	Guarany Sobral	3	(0)
2012	Madureira	0	(0)
2012	Volta Redonda	7	(0)
2013	Grêmio Osasco	4	(0)
2013	Madureira	3	(0)
2014	Sobradinho		
2015	Cabofriense		
- * Club domestic league appearances and goals

Maciel Lima Barbosa da Cunha (born 29 November 1978), known simply as Maciel, is a Brazilian former professional footballer who played as a forward.

He spent the vast majority of his professional career in Portugal, amassing Primeira Liga totals of 149 games and 36 goals over the course of seven seasons, mostly for União de Leiria (five years). He also had spells in the country with Porto and Braga.

== Career ==
Maciel was born in Caxias do Sul, Rio Grande do Sul. After beginning professionally with modest Bangu Atlético Clube and Volta Redonda Futebol Clube, he moved to Portugal in the 2001 summer, signing with U.D. Leiria and impressing well enough (22 goals in two full seasons) to eventually draw attention from Primeira Liga club Porto, which purchased the player in the 2004 January transfer window.

Maciel contributed significantly to the team's domestic supremacy renewal, appearing in 18 games and scoring three times. He could not participate, however, in its victorious campaign in the UEFA Champions League, being cup-tied for having played with Leiria in the season's UEFA Cup.

Under contract with Porto until the 2007 summer, Maciel would only appear twice in competitive matches until the end of his link, one of them a 1–1 home draw against former side Leiria in September 2004. He would be loaned in quick succession Clube Atlético Paranaense, Leiria and S.C. Braga, amassing a further 50 appearances with eight goals in Portugal's top level for the latter two. Subsequently, he signed permanently for Leiria, producing a disastrous campaign at all levels – only eight matches, no goals and club relegation, as last.

After nearly seven consecutive years in the same nation, Maciel left for Skoda Xanthi in Greece, in another unassuming spell. He then returned to his Brazil with lowly Associação Desportiva Cabofriense and Angra dos Reis Esporte Clube; in January 2010 he rejoined his very first professional club Volta Redonda, netting twice in his first three matches in the Campeonato Carioca.

Maciel played the remainder of his career in his country's lower leagues, including several spells with Madureira Esporte Clube.

== Personal life ==
Maciel is father os the also footballer Mateus Cunha.
