= 2005–06 Chelsea F.C. season =

English football club season

Chelsea
2005–06 season
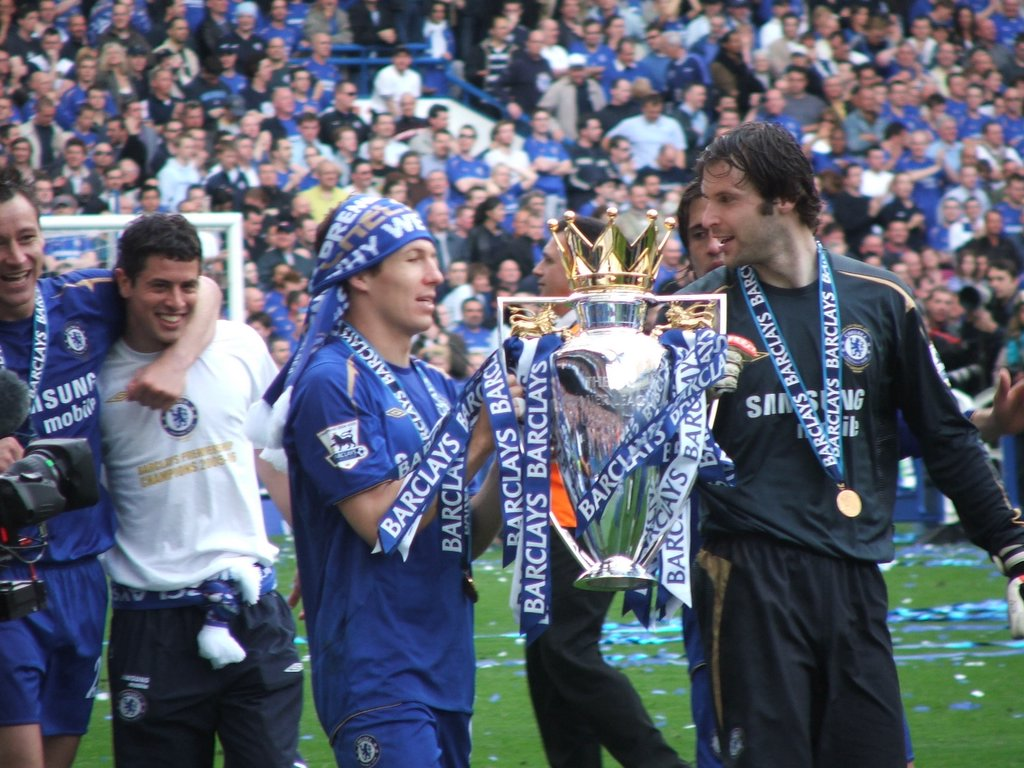
- Chelsea's 2005–06 Premier League Trophy Presentation
- Owner: Roman Abramovich
- Chairman: Bruce Buck
- Manager: José Mourinho
- Stadium: Stamford Bridge
- Premier League: 1st
- FA Cup: Semi-finals
- League Cup: Third round
- FA Community Shield: Winners
- UEFA Champions League: Round of 16
- Top goalscorer: League: Frank Lampard (16); All: Frank Lampard (20)
Home colours	Away colours	Third colours

The 2005–06 season was Chelsea F.C.'s 92nd competitive season, 14th consecutive season in the Premier League and 100th year as a club. Managed by José Mourinho, Chelsea marked their Centenary season by winning the Premier League title for the second consecutive year after defeating their closest challengers Manchester United 3–0 at Stamford Bridge on 29 April 2006. They also won the Community Shield.

Chelsea continued spending vast sums of money in their third season under the ownership of Roman Abramovich, signing Michael Essien from Lyon and Shaun Wright-Phillips from Manchester City for more than £20 million each.

In the Champions League, Chelsea aimed to improve upon their second straight semi-final placing the previous year, but exited the competition in the first knockout round to FC Barcelona. In the FA Cup, they managed to improve on their fifth-round exit in the previous season, but fell short in the semi-final, losing 2–1 to Liverpool. After winning the League Cup in the previous season, they failed to defend their title by taking an early third-round exit to Charlton Athletic on penalties.

The season was momentous for Chelsea's record-breaking start to the Premier League season where they won their opening nine games in a row, which is the best start to a Premier League season by any side. The Blues proceeded to claim 20 wins from their first 22 league games, the strongest start recorded to a title defence in the Premier League era. Upon retaining their Champion status, Chelsea equalled the record for most victories within a league season (29), matching their total from the previous year. As of 2020, Chelsea 2005–06 hold joint Premier League records for most wins at home in a season (18) and fewest home defeats in a season (0). They were also the first Premier League team to win against every other opposition team in a season.

== Team kits ==
Supplier: Umbro / Sponsor: Samsung Mobile

Home	Home alt.	Away	Away alt. 1	Third

The team kit for the season was produced by Umbro and the shirt sponsor was Samsung Mobile, who replaced previous shirt sponsor Emirates. Chelsea's new home kit was all blue with gold accents. Their new away kit was light blue with black shorts and black accents. Their 3rd kit was similar to their away kit from the 2004–05 season, black with grey shorts and grey accents. The only difference was the addition of the new shirt sponsor and new club crest with modifications.

== Management ==
Position	Staff
Manager	(Portugal) José Mourinho
Assistant manager	(Scotland) Steve Clarke
First team coach	(Brazil) Baltemar Brito
Fitness coach	(Portugal) Rui Faria
Goalkeeping coach	(Portugal) Silvino Louro
Opposition scout	(Portugal) André Villas-Boas

== First team squad ==
Squad at end of season

Note: Flags indicate national team as defined under FIFA eligibility rules; some limited exceptions apply. Players may hold more than one non-FIFA nationality.

No.	Pos.	Nation	Player
1	GK	CZE	Petr Čech
2	DF	ENG	Glen Johnson
3	DF	ESP	Asier del Horno
4	DF	FRA	Claude Makélélé
5	MF	GHA	Michael Essien
6	DF	POR	Ricardo Carvalho
7	MF	POR	Maniche (on loan from Dynamo Moscow)
8	MF	ENG	Frank Lampard
9	FW	ARG	Hernán Crespo
10	MF	ENG	Joe Cole
11	MF	IRL	Damien Duff
12	FW	ENG	Carlton Cole
13	DF	FRA	William Gallas
14	MF	CMR	Geremi
15	FW	CIV	Didier Drogba
16	MF	NED	Arjen Robben

No.	Pos.	Nation	Player
19	MF	FRA	Lassana Diarra
20	DF	POR	Paulo Ferreira
22	FW	ISL	Eiður Guðjohnsen
23	GK	ITA	Carlo Cudicini
24	MF	ENG	Shaun Wright-Phillips
26	DF	ENG	John Terry
29	DF	GER	Robert Huth
31	FW	ENG	Scott Sinclair
40	GK	ENG	Lenny Pidgeley
41	GK	BEL	Yves Ma-Kalambay
42	MF	ENG	Anthony Grant
43	DF	SUI	Jonas Elmer
44	DF	ENG	Michael Mancienne
45	MF	POR	Filipe Morais
46	MF	ENG	Jimmy Smith

=== Left club during season ===
Note: Flags indicate national team as defined under FIFA eligibility rules; some limited exceptions apply. Players may hold more than one non-FIFA nationality.

No.	Pos.	Nation	Player
18	DF	ENG	Wayne Bridge (on loan to Fulham)
27	MF	CZE	Jiří Jarošík (on loan to Birmingham City)
30	MF	POR	Tiago (to Lyon)

No.	Pos.	Nation	Player
32	DF	SCO	Steven Watt (to Swansea City)
—	MF	ENG	Joe Keenan (on loan to Willem II)
—	MF	RUS	Alexei Smertin (to Dynamo Moscow)

== Transfers ==
=== In ===
No.	Pos	Player	From	Fee	Date
3	DF	(Spain) Asier del Horno	(Spain) Athletic Bilbao	£8 million	21 June 2005
19	MF	(France) Lassana Diarra	(France) Le Havre	£1 million	16 July 2005
24	MF	(England) Shaun Wright-Phillips	(England) Manchester City	£21 million	18 July 2005
5	MF	(Ghana) Michael Essien	(France) Lyon	£24.4 million	19 August 2005
7	MF	(Portugal) Maniche	(Russia) Dynamo Moscow	Loan	4 January 2006

=== Out ===
No.	Pos	Player	To	Fee	Date
24	FW	(Finland) Mikael Forssell	(England) Birmingham City	£3 million	10 June 2005
19	MF	(England) Scott Parker	(England) Newcastle United	£6.5 million	15 June 2005
9	FW	(Serbia and Montenegro) Mateja Kežman	(Spain) Atlético Madrid	£5.3 million	29 June 2005
5	MF	(Russia) Alexey Smertin	(England) Charlton Athletic	Loan	15 July 2005
27	MF	(Czech Republic) Jiří Jarošík	(England) Birmingham City	Loan	22 August 2005
30	MF	(Portugal) Tiago	(France) Lyon	£6.8 million	27 August 2005
40	GK	(England) Lenny Pidgeley	(England) Millwall	Loan	28 November 2005
5	MF	(Russia) Alexey Smertin	(Russia) Dynamo Moscow	£1 million	15 March 2006

=== Overall transfer activity ===
==== Total spending ====
Summer: ▼£58,400,000

Winter: £0,000,000

Total: ▼£58,400,000

==== Income ====
Summer: ▲£22,600,000

Winter: £0,000,000

Total: ▲£22,600,000

==== Expenditure ====
Summer: ▼£35,800,000

Winter: £0,000,000

Total: ▼£35,800,000

== Competitions ==
=== FA Community Shield ===
7 August 2005	Arsenal	1–2	Chelsea	Cardiff
14:05 BST	Fàbregas (yellow card) 24' (goal) 64'		Drogba 8', 58'; Makélélé (yellow card) 24'; Lampard (yellow card) 82'	Stadium: Millennium Stadium; Attendance: 58,014; Referee: Howard Webb; Man of the Match: (Ivory Coast) Didier Drogba

=== Premier League ===
Upon winning the 2005–06 Premier League season, Chelsea clinched their third national league title.

==== League table ====
Pos	Team	Pld	W	D	L	GF	GA	GD	Pts	Qualification or relegation
1	Chelsea (C)	38	29	4	5	72	22	+50	91	Qualification for the Champions League group stage
2	Manchester United	38	25	8	5	72	34	+38	83	Qualification for the Champions League group stage
3	Liverpool	38	25	7	6	57	25	+32	82	Qualification for the Champions League third qualifying round
4	Arsenal	38	20	7	11	68	31	+37	67	Qualification for the Champions League third qualifying round
5	Tottenham Hotspur	38	18	11	9	53	38	+15	65	Qualification for the UEFA Cup first round (Note: Since Manchester United qualified for the Champions League, their place in the UEFA Cup as League Cup winners passed down to the league and was awarded to Blackburn Rovers as the highest-placed team not already qualified for European competitions.)

Source: Barclays Premier League
Rules for classification: 1) points; 2) goal difference; 3) number of goals scored.
(C) Champions

==== Results summary ====
Overall								Home						Away					
Pld	W	D	L	GF	GA	GD	Pts	W	D	L	GF	GA	GD	W	D	L	GF	GA	GD
38	29	4	5	72	22	+50	91	18	1	0	47	9	+38	11	3	5	25	13	+12

==== Results by round ====
Round	1	2	3	4	5	6	7	8	9	10	11	12	13	14	15	16	17	18	19	20	21	22	23	24	25	26	27	28	29	30	31	32	33	34	35	36	37	38
Ground	A	H	H	A	H	A	H	A	H	A	H	A	H	A	H	H	A	H	A	H	A	A	H	A	H	A	H	A	H	A	H	A	H	A	H	H	A	A
Result	W	W	W	W	W	W	W	W	W	D	W	L	W	W	W	W	W	W	W	W	W	W	D	D	W	L	W	W	W	L	W	D	W	W	W	W	L	L
Position	6	5	1	1	1	1	1	1	1	1	1	1	1	1	1	1	1	1	1	1	1	1	1	1	1	1	1	1	1	1	1	1	1	1	1	1	1	1
Points	3	6	9	12	15	18	21	24	27	28	31	31	34	37	40	43	46	49	52	55	58	61	62	63	66	66	69	72	75	75	78	79	82	85	88	91	91	91

Source: Matches
A = Away; H = Home; W = Win; D = Draw; L = Loss

==== Matches ====
14 August 2005 1	Wigan Athletic	0–1	Chelsea	Wigan
16:00 BST	Mahon (yellow card) 23'	Report	Crespo 90+3'	Stadium: JJB Stadium; Attendance: 23,575; Referee: Mark Clattenburg

21 August 2005 2	Chelsea	1–0	Arsenal	London
16:00 BST	Drogba 73'; Gallas (yellow card) 30'; Makélélé (yellow card) 70'	Report	Van Persie (yellow card) 27'; Senderos (yellow card) 30'; Cole (yellow card) 52'	Stadium: Stamford Bridge; Attendance: 42,136; Referee: Graham Poll

24 August 2005 3	Chelsea	4–0	West Bromwich Albion	London
19:45 BST	Lampard 23', 80'; J. Cole 43'; Drogba 68'	Report		Stadium: Stamford Bridge; Attendance: 41,201; Referee: Mark Halsey

27 August 2005 4	Tottenham Hotspur	0–2	Chelsea	London
15:00 BST	Mido (red card) 25'; Gardner (yellow card) 26'; Reid (yellow card) 26'; Davids (yellow card) 74'	Report	Del Horno 39'; Duff 71'; Essien (yellow card) 24'; J. Cole (yellow card) 26'	Stadium: White Hart Lane; Attendance: 36,077; Referee: Rob Styles

10 September 2005 5	Chelsea	2–0	Sunderland	London
15:00 BST	Geremi 54'; Drogba 82'; J. Cole (yellow card) 31'	Report		Stadium: Stamford Bridge; Attendance: 41,969; Referee: Mike Dean

17 September 2005 6	Charlton Athletic	0–2	Chelsea	London
15:00 BST		Report	Crespo 55'; Robben 60'; Carvalho (yellow card) 51'; Makélélé (yellow card) 82'	Stadium: The Valley; Attendance: 27,111; Referee: Mike Dean

24 September 2005 7	Chelsea	2–1	Aston Villa	London
15:00 BST	Lampard 45', 75' (pen.); Robben (yellow card) 33'	Report	Moore 44'; Ángel (yellow card) 40'	Stadium: Stamford Bridge; Attendance: 42,146; Referee: Barry Knight

2 October 2005 8	Liverpool	1–4	Chelsea	Liverpool
16:00 BST	Gerrard 36'; Caragher (yellow card) 27'	Report	Lampard 27' (pen.) (yellow card) 54'; Duff 43'; J. Cole 63' (yellow card) 24'; Geremi 82'; Drogba (yellow card) 86'	Stadium: Anfield; Attendance: 44,235; Referee: Graham Poll

15 October 2005 9	Chelsea	5–1	Bolton Wanderers	London
15:00 BST	Drogba 52', 61', (yellow card) 32'; Lampard 55', 59'; Guðjohnsen 74'; Essien (yellow card) 63'	Report	Giannakopoulos 4'; Jaïdi (yellow card) 12'; Nolan (yellow card) 42'; Gardener (red card) 58'	Stadium: Stamford Bridge; Attendance: 41,775; Referee: Rob Styles

23 October 2005 10	Everton	1–1	Chelsea	Liverpool
15:00 BST	Beattie 37' (pen.); Arteta (yellow card) 50'; Ferrari (yellow card) 59'	Report	Lampard 50'; Drogba (yellow card) 21'; Huth (yellow card) 63'	Stadium: Goodison Park; Attendance: 36,042; Referee: Mark Clattenburg

29 October 2005 11	Chelsea	4–2	Blackburn Rovers	London
15:00 GMT	Drogba 10'; Lampard 14' (pen.), 62'; Khizanishvili 74' (o.g.); J. Cole (yellow card) 75'	Report	Bellamy 18' (pen.), 44'; Pedersen (yellow card) 14'; Tudgay (yellow card) 15'; Khizanishvili (yellow card) 42'; Dickov (yellow card) 83'; Reid (yellow card) 90+2'	Stadium: Stamford Bridge; Attendance: 41,553; Referee: Mike Riley

6 November 2005 12	Manchester United	1–0	Chelsea	Manchester
16:00 GMT	Fletcher 31', (yellow card) 35'; Smith (yellow card) 12'; Ronaldo (yellow card) 84'	Report	Drogba (yellow card) 14'; Ferreira (yellow card) 41'; Gallas (yellow card) 52'; Makélélé (yellow card) 81'	Stadium: Old Trafford; Attendance: 67,864; Referee: Graham Poll

19 November 2005 13	Chelsea	3–0	Newcastle United	London
15:00 GMT	J. Cole 47'; Crespo 51'; Duff 90'; Terry (yellow card) 5'; Lampard (yellow card) 89'	Report	Solano (yellow card) 31'	Stadium: Stamford Bridge; Attendance: 42,268; Referee: Mark Halsey

26 November 2005 14	Portsmouth	0–2	Chelsea	Portsmouth
15:00 GMT	Diao (yellow card) 52'; Hughes (yellow card) 60'; Griffin (yellow card) 64'; Stefanović (yellow card) 66'; Taylor (yellow card) 87'	Report	Crespo 27'; Lampard 67' (pen.); C. Cole (yellow card) 57'	Stadium: Fratton Park; Attendance: 20,182; Referee: Phil Dowd

3 December 2005 15	Chelsea	1–0	Middlesbrough	London
15:00 GMT	Terry 62'	Report		Stadium: Stamford Bridge; Attendance: 41,666; Referee: Mike Riley

10 December 2005 16	Chelsea	1–0	Wigan Athletic	London
15:00 GMT	Terry 67'; Carvalho (yellow card) 12'	Report	Roberts (yellow card) 83'	Stadium: Stamford Bridge; Attendance: 42,060; Referee: Howard Webb

18 December 2005 17	Arsenal	0–2	Chelsea	London
16:00 GMT	Van Persie (yellow card) 29'; Senderos (yellow card) 46'; Henry (yellow card) 51'	Report	Robben 39', (yellow card) 51'; J. Cole 73'; Essien (yellow card) 34'; Makélélé (yellow card) 59'; Lampard (yellow card) 85'	Stadium: Highbury; Attendance: 38,347; Referee: Rob Styles

26 December 2005 18	Chelsea	3–2	Fulham	London
16:00 GMT	Gallas 3'; Lampard 24'; Crespo 74'; J. Cole (yellow card) 56'	Report	McBride 29'; Helguson 57' (pen.); Christanval (yellow card) 62'; Legwinski (yellow card) 65'; John (yellow card) 89'	Stadium: Stamford Bridge; Attendance: 42,313; Referee: Graham Poll

28 December 2005 19	Manchester City	0–1	Chelsea	Manchester
19:45 GMT	Thatcher (yellow card) 78'	Report	J. Cole 79'; Del Horno (yellow card) 52'	Stadium: City of Manchester Stadium; Attendance: 46,587; Referee: Uriah Rennie

31 December 2005 20	Chelsea	2–0	Birmingham City	London
19:45 GMT	Crespo 25'; Robben 43'; Essien (yellow card) 21'	Report		Stadium: Stamford Bridge; Attendance: 42,313; Referee: Mike Dean

2 January 2006 21	West Ham United	1–3	Chelsea	London
19:45 GMT	Harewood 46'; Fletcher (yellow card) 49'	Report	Lampard 12', (yellow card) 49'; Crespo 28'; Drogba 80'; Duff (yellow card) 20'; Guðjohnsen (yellow card) 69'	Stadium: Upton Park; Attendance: 34,758; Referee: Mike Dean

15 January 2006 22	Sunderland	1–2	Chelsea	Sunderland, Tyne and Wear
16:00 GMT	Lawrence 12'; Stead (yellow card) 25'	Report	Crespo 28'; Robben 69', (red card) 70'; C. Cole	Stadium: Stadium of Light; Attendance: 32,420; Referee: Chris Foy

22 January 2006 23	Chelsea	1–1	Charlton Athletic	London
16:00 GMT	Guðjohnsen 19'; Carvalho (red card) 81'; Terry (yellow card) 82'	Report	Bent 59'; Kishishev (yellow card) 82'	Stadium: Stamford Bridge; Attendance: 41,355; Referee: Steve Bennett

1 February 2006 24	Aston Villa	1–1	Chelsea	Birmingham
20:00 GMT	Moore 77'; McCann (yellow card) 31'	Report	Robben 14'; Crespo (yellow card) 42'; Johnson (yellow card) 51'; Gallas (yellow card) 90+2'	Stadium: Villa Park; Attendance: 38,562; Referee: Rob Styles

5 February 2006 25	Chelsea	2–0	Liverpool	London
16:00 GMT	Gallas 35'; Crespo 68'; Essien (yellow card) 47'	Report	Reina (red card) 82'; García (yellow card) 63'; Alonso (yellow card) 90+1'	Stadium: Stamford Bridge; Attendance: 42,316; Referee: Alan Wiley

11 February 2006 26	Middlesbrough	3–0	Chelsea	Middlesbrough
16:00 GMT	Rochemback 2'; Downing 45+2'; Yakubu 68'	Report	Terry (yellow card) 42'; Guðjohnsen (yellow card) 45+1'; Carvalho (yellow card) 90+4'	Stadium: Riverside Stadium; Attendance: 31,037; Referee: Steve Bennett

25 February 2006 27	Chelsea	2–0	Portsmouth	London
15:00 GMT	Lampard 65'; Robben 75'	Report	LuaLua (yellow card) 34'	Stadium: Stamford Bridge; Attendance: 42,254; Referee: Mike Riley

4 March 2006 28	West Bromwich Albion	1–2	Chelsea	West Bromwich
15:00 GMT	Kanu 88'	Report	Drogba 51'; J. Cole 74'; Robben (red card) 62'	Stadium: The Hawthorns; Attendance: 26,581; Referee: Mark Halsey

11 March 2006 29	Chelsea	2–1	Tottenham Hotspur	London
16:00 GMT	Essien 14'; Gallas 90+4'; Duff (yellow card) 29'; Drogba (yellow card) 88'	Report	Jenas 45+1'	Stadium: Stamford Bridge; Attendance: 42,243; Referee: Graham Poll

19 March 2006 30	Fulham	1–0	Chelsea	London
16:00 GMT	Boa Morte 17'	Report	Gallas (red card) 90+2'; Huth (yellow card) 44'; Carvalho (yellow card) 51'; Drogba (yellow card) 67'; Makélélé (yellow card) 70'	Stadium: Craven Cottage; Attendance: 22,486; Referee: Graham Poll

25 March 2006 31	Chelsea	2–0	Manchester City	London
15:00 GMT	Drogba 30', 33'; J. Cole (yellow card) 74'	Report	Distin (red card) 45'; Mills (yellow card) 24'; Musampa (yellow card) 45+1'	Stadium: Stamford Bridge; Attendance: 42,321; Referee: Rob Styles

1 April 2006 32	Birmingham City	0–0	Chelsea	Birmingham
15:00 BST		Report		Stadium: St Andrew's; Attendance: 26,364; Referee: Dermot Gallagher

9 April 2006 33	Chelsea	4–1	West Ham United	London
13:00 BST	Drogba 28'; Crespo 31'; Terry 54'; Gallas 69'; Maniche (red card) 17'	Report	Collins 10'; Harewood (yellow card) 17'; Konchesky (yellow card) 47'	Stadium: Stamford Bridge; Attendance: 41,919; Referee: Chris Foy

15 April 2006 34	Bolton Wanderers	0–2	Chelsea	Bolton
15:00 BST	Ben Haim (red card) 90+1'; Gardner (yellow card) 30'; Davies (yellow card) 51'	Report	Terry 44'; Lampard 59'; Makélélé (yellow card) 41'; Drogba (yellow card) 82'; Huth (yellow card) 87'	Stadium: Reebok Stadium; Attendance: 27,266; Referee: Phil Dowd

17 April 2006 35	Chelsea	3–0	Everton	London
15:00 BST	Lampard 28'; Drogba 62'; Essien 74'	Report	Carsley (red card) 47'	Stadium: Stamford Bridge; Attendance: 41,765; Referee: Rob Styles

29 April 2006 36	Chelsea	3–0	Manchester United	London
12:30 BST	Gallas 5', (yellow card) 52'; J. Cole 61', (yellow card) 62'; Carvalho 73'; Čech (yellow card) 8'; Makélélé (yellow card) 34'	Report	Ronaldo (yellow card) 55'; Rooney (yellow card) 66'	Stadium: Stamford Bridge; Attendance: 42,219; Referee: Mike Dean

2 May 2006 37	Blackburn Rovers	1–0	Chelsea	Blackburn
19:45 BST	Reid 43'; Savage (yellow card) 1'; Gray (yellow card) 90+4'	Report	Geremi (yellow card) 42'; Duff (yellow card) 70'	Stadium: Ewood Park; Attendance: 20,243; Referee: Steve Bennett

7 May 2006 38	Newcastle United	1–0	Chelsea	Newcastle upon Tyne
15:00 BST	Bramble 73'; N'Zogbia (yellow card) 53'; Babyaro (yellow card) 61'; Belözoğlu (yellow card) 70'; Moore (yellow card) 89'; Carr (red card) 90+5'	Report	Carvalho (yellow card) 22'; Gallas (yellow card) 75'	Stadium: St James' Park; Attendance: 52,309; Referee: Mike Riley

=== UEFA Champions League ===
==== Group stage ====
Pos	Team	Pld	W	D	L	GF	GA	GD	Pts	Qualification	LIV	CHE	BET	AND
1	(England) Liverpool	6	3	3	0	6	1	+5	12	Advance to knockout stage	—	0–0	0–0	3–0
2	(England) Chelsea	6	3	2	1	7	1	+6	11	Advance to knockout stage	0–0	—	4–0	1–0
3	(Spain) Real Betis	6	2	1	3	3	7	−4	7	Transfer to UEFA Cup	1–2	1–0	—	0–1
4	(Belgium) Anderlecht	6	1	0	5	1	8	−7	3		0–1	0–2	0–1	—

Source: RSSSF

13 September 2005 1	Chelsea (England)	1–0	(Belgium) Anderlecht	London, England
19:45 BST	Lampard 19'	(Report)		Stadium: Stamford Bridge; Attendance: 29,575; Referee: Wolfgang Stark (Germany)

28 September 2005 2	Liverpool (England)	0–0	(England) Chelsea	Liverpool, England
19:45 BST		(Report)		Stadium: Anfield; Attendance: 42,750; Referee: Massimo De Santis (Italy)

19 October 2005 3	Chelsea (England)	4–0	(Spain) Real Betis	London, England
19:45 GMT	Drogba 24'; Carvalho 44'; J. Cole 59'; Crespo 64'	(Report)		Stadium: Stamford Bridge; Attendance: 36,450; Referee: Terje Hauge (Norway)

1 November 2005 4	Real Betis (Spain)	1–0	(England) Chelsea	Seville, Spain
19:45 GMT	Dani 28'	(Report)		Stadium: Manuel Ruiz de Lopera; Attendance: 55,000; Referee: Alain Hamer (Luxembourg)

23 November 2005 5	Anderlecht (Belgium)	0–2	(England) Chelsea	Brussels, Belgium
19:45 GMT		(Report)	Crespo 8'; Carvalho 15'	Stadium: Constant Vanden Stock Stadium; Attendance: 21,070; Referee: Stefano Farina (Italy)

6 December 2005 6	Chelsea (England)	0–0	(England) Liverpool	London, England
19:45 GMT		(Report)		Stadium: Stamford Bridge; Attendance: 41,600; Referee: Herbert Fandel (Germany)

==== Knockout phase ====
===== Round of 16 =====
22 February 2006 First leg	Chelsea (England)	1–2	(Spain) Barcelona	London, England
19:45 GMT	del Horno (red card) 37'; Motta 59' (o.g.)	(Report)	Terry 72' (o.g.); Eto'o 80'	Stadium: Stamford Bridge; Attendance: 39,525; Referee: Terje Hauge (Norway)

7 March 2006 Second leg	Barcelona (Spain)	1–1 (3–2 agg.)	(England) Chelsea	Barcelona, Spain
19:45 GMT	Ronaldinho 78'	(Report)	Lampard 90+2' (pen.)	Stadium: Camp Nou; Attendance: 98,450; Referee: Markus Merk (Germany)

=== League Cup ===
26 October 2005 Third round	Chelsea	1–1 (a.e.t.) (4–5 p)	Charlton Athletic	Stamford Bridge, London
	Terry 41'	(Report)	Bent 45'	Attendance: 42,198; Referee: Alan Wiley
	Penalties
	Robben (penalty scored); Huth (penalty missed); Guðjohnsen (penalty scored); Lampard (penalty scored); Drogba (penalty scored)		(penalty scored) Bent; (penalty scored) Bothroyd; (penalty scored) Holland; (penalty scored) Hreiðarsson; (penalty scored) Hughes

=== FA Cup ===
7 January 2006 Third round	Chelsea	2–1	Huddersfield Town	Stamford Bridge, London
	C. Cole 12'; Guðjohnsen 82'	(Report)	Taylor-Fletcher 75'	Attendance: 41,650; Referee: Alan Wiley

29 January 2006 Fourth round	Everton	1–1	Chelsea	Goodison Park, Liverpool
	McFadden 36'	(Report)	Lampard 73'	Attendance: 29,742; Referee: Graham Poll

8 February 2006 Replay	Chelsea	4–1	Everton	Stamford Bridge, London
	Robben 22'; Lampard 36' (pen.); Crespo 39'; Terry 74'	(Report)	Arteta 72' (pen.)	Attendance: 39,301; Referee: Phil Dowd

19 February 2006 Fifth round	Chelsea	3–1	Colchester United	Stamford Bridge, London
	Ferreira 37'; J. Cole 79', 90'	(Report)	Carvalho 28' (o.g.)	Attendance: 41,810; Referee: Dermot Gallagher

22 March 2006 Quarter-final	Chelsea	1–0	Newcastle United	Stamford Bridge, London
	Terry 4'	(Report)		Attendance: 42,279; Referee: Steve Bennett

22 April 2006 Semi-final	Chelsea	1–2	Liverpool	Old Trafford, Manchester
	Drogba 69'	(Report)	Riise 20'; García 52'	Attendance: 64,575; Referee: Graham Poll

== Statistics ==
No.	Pos	Nat	Player	Total		Premier League		Champions League		FA Cup		League Cup	
No.	Pos	Nat	Player	Apps	Goals	Apps	Goals	Apps	Goals	Apps	Goals	Apps	Goals
1	GK	(Czech Republic) CZE	Petr Čech	41	0	34	0	7	0	0	0	0	0
13	DF	(France) FRA	William Gallas	44	5	33+1	5	7	0	3	0	0	0
6	DF	(Portugal) POR	Ricardo Carvalho	35	3	22+2	1	8	2	3	0	0	0
26	DF	(England) ENG	John Terry	49	7	36	4	8	0	4	2	1	1
3	DF	(Spain) ESP	Asier del Horno	33	1	25	1	3+1	0	3+1	0	0	0
10	MF	(England) ENG	Joe Cole	47	10	26+8	7	5+1	1	3+3	2	0+1	0
4	MF	(France) FRA	Claude Makélélé	40	0	29+2	0	6	0	3	0	0	0
5	MF	(Ghana) GHA	Michael Essien	41	2	27+4	2	6	0	3+1	0	0	0
8	MF	(England) ENG	Frank Lampard	49	20	35	16	8	2	4+1	2	0+1	0
16	MF	(Netherlands) NED	Arjen Robben	39	7	21+7	6	6	0	2+2	1	1	0
15	FW	(Ivory Coast) CIV	Didier Drogba	40	14	20+9	12	5+2	1	3	1	0+1	0
23	GK	(Italy) ITA	Carlo Cudicini	12	0	3+1	0	1	0	6	0	1	0
9	FW	(Argentina) ARG	Hernán Crespo	41	13	20+10	10	2+3	2	3+2	1	1	0
11	MF	(Republic of Ireland) IRL	Damien Duff	39	3	18+10	3	5+1	0	3+2	0	0	0
20	DF	(Portugal) POR	Paulo Ferreira	31	1	18+3	0	6	0	2+1	1	1	0
22	FW	(Iceland) ISL	Eiður Guðjohnsen	36	3	16+10	2	4+2	0	3	1	1	0
24	MF	(England) ENG	Shaun Wright-Phillips	38	0	10+17	0	1+5	0	3+1	0	1	0
14	MF	(Cameroon) CMR	Geremi	21	2	8+7	2	0+2	0	2+1	0	1	0
29	DF	(Germany) GER	Robert Huth	21	0	7+6	0	0+3	0	3+1	0	1	0
2	DF	(England) ENG	Glen Johnson	8	0	4	0	0	0	4	0	0	0
7	MF	(Portugal) POR	Maniche	11	0	3+5	0	2+1	0	0	0	0	0
19	MF	(France) FRA	Lassana Diarra	7	0	2+1	0	0+2	0	2	0	0	0
40	GK	(England) ENG	Lenny Pidgeley	1	0	1	0	0	0	0	0	0	0
12	FW	(England) ENG	Carlton Cole	13	1	0+9	0	0+2	0	1+1	1	0	0
18	DF	(England) ENG	Wayne Bridge	2	0	0	0	0	0	1	0	1	0
37	MF	(England) ENG	Jimmy Smith	1	0	0+1	0	0	0	0	0	0	0

Statistics:. Squad details and shirt numbers:

=== Starting 11 ===
Considering starts in all competitions.

No.	Pos	Player	Starts
1	GK	(Czech Republic) Čech	42
13	RB	(France) Gallas	44
6	CB	(Portugal) Carvalho	33
26	CB	(England) Terry (Captain)	50
3	LB	(Spain) Del Horno	32
4	DM	(France) Makélélé	39
5	CM	(Ghana) Essien	36
8	CM	(England) Lampard	48
10	RW	(England) J. Cole	34
16	LW	(Netherlands) Robben	31
15	CF	(Ivory Coast) Drogba	29

=== Summary ===
Games played	54 (38 Premier League) (8 UEFA Champions League) (6 FA Cup) (1 Football League Cup) (1 FA Community Shield)
Games won	37 (29 Premier League) (3 UEFA Champions League) (4 FA Cup) (0 Football League Cup) (1 FA Community Shield)
Games drawn	9 (4 Premier League) (3 UEFA Champions League) (1 FA Cup) (1 Football League Cup)
Games lost	8 (5 Premier League) (2 UEFA Champions League) (1 FA Cup) (0 Football League Cup)
Goals scored	96 (72 Premier League) (9 UEFA Champions League) (12 FA Cup) (1 Football League Cup) (2 FA Community Shield)
Goals conceded	34 (22 Premier League) (4 UEFA Champions League) (6 FA Cup) (1 Football League Cup) (1 FA Community Shield)
Goal difference	62 (+50 Premier League) (+5 UEFA Champions League) (+6 FA Cup) (0 Football League Cup) (+1 FA Community Shield)
Clean sheets	37 (20 Premier League) (5 UEFA Champions League) (1 FA Cup) (0 Football League Cup) (0 FA Community Shield)
Most appearances	50 (England) Frank Lampard & (England) John Terry
Top scorer	20 (England) Frank Lampard
Points	Overall: 37/54 (68.52%)
