= 2006–07 Chelsea F.C. season =

English football club season

Chelsea F.C.
2006–07 season
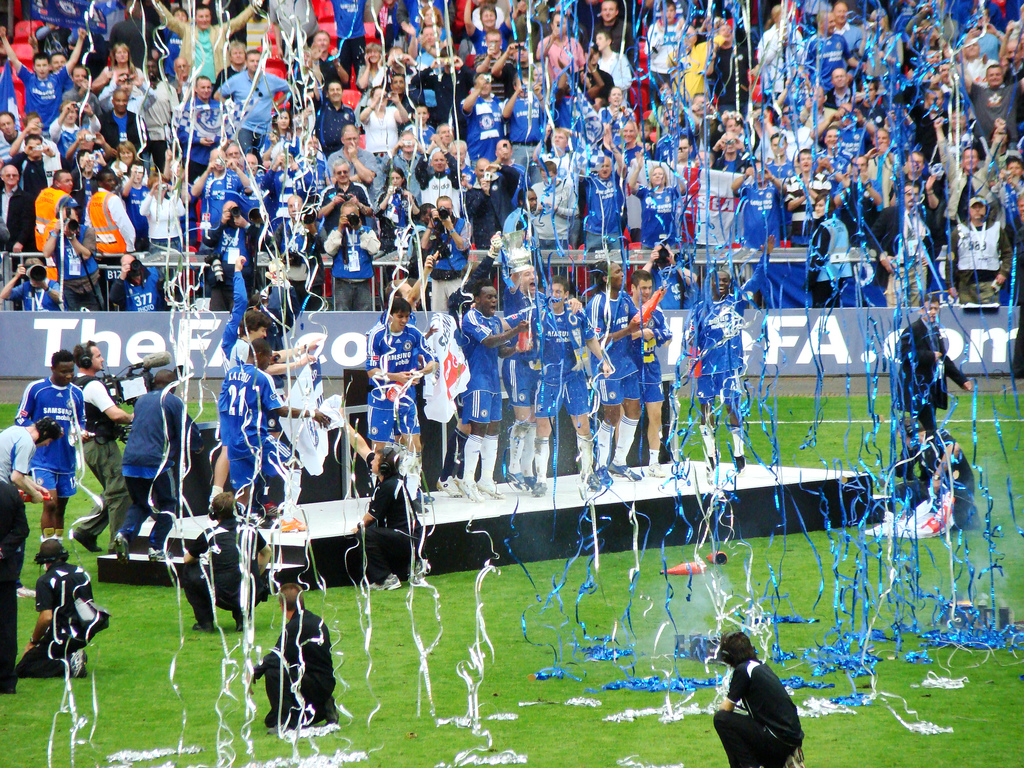
- Chelsea players celebrating the FA Cup title
- Owner: Roman Abramovich
- Chairman: Bruce Buck
- Manager: José Mourinho
- Stadium: Stamford Bridge
- FA Premier League: 2nd
- FA Cup: Winners
- League Cup: Winners
- FA Community Shield: Runners-up
- UEFA Champions League: Semi-finals
- Top goalscorer: League: Didier Drogba (20); All: Didier Drogba (33)
- Highest home attendance: 41,953 (20 August vs Manchester City)
- Lowest home attendance: 32,135 (12 September vs Werder Bremen)
- Average home league attendance: League: 39,333; All: 38,099
| Home colours | Away colours | Third colours |

The 2006–07 season was Chelsea F.C.'s 93rd competitive season, 15th consecutive season in the Premier League and 101st year as a club. Managed by José Mourinho, the club won both the FA Cup and the League Cup.

Chelsea were in race to win a unique Quadruple until 1 May. The 2006–07 Premier League was decided on matchday 36, after Chelsea failed to win against Arsenal at the Emirates Stadium. This left them seven points behind Manchester United with two games to go, confirming Manchester United as league champions.

The season was their fourth under the ownership of Roman Abramovich and Chelsea spent heavily in the transfer market before the season. Notable transactions include the signing of Andriy Shevchenko from Milan for £30 million and Salomon Kalou from Feyenoord for an undisclosed fee. They also added Michael Ballack from Bayern Munich on free transfer and also exchanged William Gallas and £5 million with Arsenal for Ashley Cole.

In the Champions League, Chelsea aimed to improve upon their first knockout round exit in the previous season. They managed to reach the semi-finals for the third time in four seasons, but lost to Liverpool 4–1 on penalties after a 1–1 aggregate scoreline. Chelsea also lost the pre season Community Shield to Liverpool at the beginning of the season.

== Kits ==
Supplier: Adidas / Sponsor: Samsung Mobile

| Home | Home alt. | Away | Away alt. 1 | Away alt. 2 | Away alt. 3 | Third | Third alt. |

| Goalkeeper 1 | Goalkeeper 2 | Goalkeeper 2 alt. | Goalkeeper 2 (Worn by John Terry) |

== Management ==
| Position | Staff |
|---|---|
| Manager | (Portugal) José Mourinho |
| Assistant manager | (Scotland) Steve Clarke |
| First team coach | (Brazil) Baltemar Brito |
| Fitness coach | (Portugal) Rui Faria |
| Goalkeeping coach | (Portugal) Silvino Louro |
| Opposition scout | (Portugal) André Villas-Boas |

== First team squad ==
Squad at end of season

Note: Flags indicate national team as defined under FIFA eligibility rules; some limited exceptions apply. Players may hold more than one non-FIFA nationality.

| No. | Pos. | Nation | Player |
|---|---|---|---|
| 1 | GK | CZE | Petr Čech |
| 3 | DF | ENG | Ashley Cole |
| 4 | MF | FRA | Claude Makélélé |
| 5 | MF | GHA | Michael Essien |
| 6 | DF | POR | Ricardo Carvalho |
| 7 | FW | UKR | Andriy Shevchenko |
| 8 | MF | ENG | Frank Lampard |
| 9 | DF | NED | Khalid Boulahrouz |
| 10 | MF | ENG | Joe Cole |
| 11 | FW | CIV | Didier Drogba |
| 12 | MF | NGR | Mikel John Obi |
| 13 | MF | GER | Michael Ballack |
| 14 | MF | CMR | Geremi |
| 16 | MF | NED | Arjen Robben |

| No. | Pos. | Nation | Player |
|---|---|---|---|
| 18 | DF | ENG | Wayne Bridge |
| 19 | MF | FRA | Lassana Diarra |
| 20 | DF | POR | Paulo Ferreira |
| 21 | FW | CIV | Salomon Kalou |
| 23 | GK | ITA | Carlo Cudicini |
| 24 | MF | ENG | Shaun Wright-Phillips |
| 26 | DF | ENG | John Terry |
| 40 | GK | POR | Henrique Hilário |
| 41 | GK | BEL | Yves Ma-Kalambay |
| 47 | FW | ISR | Ben Sahar |
| 48 | MF | ENG | Michael Woods |
| 49 | FW | ENG | Scott Sinclair |
| 51 | DF | ENG | Sam Hutchinson |

=== Left club during season ===
Note: Flags indicate national team as defined under FIFA eligibility rules; some limited exceptions apply. Players may hold more than one non-FIFA nationality.

| No. | Pos. | Nation | Player |
|---|---|---|---|
| 2 | DF | ENG | Glen Johnson (on loan to Portsmouth) |
| 13 | DF | FRA | William Gallas (to Arsenal) |
| 29 | DF | GER | Robert Huth (to Middlesbrough) |
| 30 | MF | ENG | Anthony Grant (on loan to Wycombe Wanderers) |
| 44 | DF | ENG | Michael Mancienne (on loan to Queens Park Rangers) |

| No. | Pos. | Nation | Player |
|---|---|---|---|
| 46 | MF | ENG | Jimmy Smith (on loan to Queens Park Rangers) |
| — | DF | ENG | Adrian Pettigrew (on loan to Wycombe Wanderers) |
| — | DF | ENG | Harry Worley (on loan to Doncaster Rovers) |
| — | MF | ENG | Jack Cork (on loan to AFC Bournemouth) |
| — | MF | ENG | James Simmonds (on loan to Cardiff City) |

== Reserve squad ==
Note: Flags indicate national team as defined under FIFA eligibility rules; some limited exceptions apply. Players may hold more than one non-FIFA nationality.

| No. | Pos. | Nation | Player |
|---|---|---|---|
| 22 | GK | SWE | Magnus Hedman |
| 33 | DF | POR | Nuno Morais |
| 42 | DF | SUI | Jonas Elmer |
| 43 | DF | ENG | Ryan Bertrand |
| 44 | DF | ENG | Michael Mancienne |
| 46 | MF | ENG | Jimmy Smith |
| 50 | MF | ENG | Lee Sawyer |

| No. | Pos. | Nation | Player |
|---|---|---|---|
| 52 | GK | WAL | Rhys Taylor |
| — | GK | IRL | James Russell |
| — | DF | ENG | Adrian Pettigrew |
| — | DF | ENG | Harry Worley |
| — | MF | ENG | Jack Cork |
| — | MF | ENG | James Simmonds |
| — | MF | POR | Fábio Ferreira |

== Transfers ==
=== In ===
| # | Pos | Player | From | Fee | Date |
|---|---|---|---|---|---|
| 13 | MF | (Germany) Michael Ballack | (Germany) Bayern Munich | Free | 15 May 2006 |
| 21 | FW | (Ivory Coast) Salomon Kalou | (Netherlands) Feyenoord | £9 million | 30 May 2006 |
| 7 | FW | (Ukraine) Andriy Shevchenko | (Italy) Milan | £30 million | 31 May 2006 |
| 12 | DM | (Nigeria) Mikel John Obi | (Norway) Lyn | £4 million | 19 July 2006 |
| 9 | DF | (Netherlands) Khalid Boulahrouz | (Germany) Hamburger SV | £8.5 million | 21 August 2006 |
| 3 | DF | (England) Ashley Cole | (England) Arsenal | £5 million + Gallas | 31 August 2006 |

=== Out ===
| # | Pos | Player | To | Fee | Date |
|---|---|---|---|---|---|
| 40 | GK | (England) Lenny Pidgeley | (England) Millwall | Free | 9 June 2006 |
| 22 | FW | (Iceland) Eiður Guðjohnsen | (Spain) Barcelona | £8 million | 14 June 2006 |
| 27 | MF | (Czech Republic) Jiří Jarošík | (Scotland) Celtic | £2 million | 19 June 2006 |
| 12 | FW | (England) Carlton Cole | (England) West Ham United | £3 million | 1 July 2006 |
| 11 | MF | (Republic of Ireland) Damien Duff | (England) Newcastle United | £5 million | 22 July 2006 |
| 3 | DF | (Spain) Asier del Horno | (Spain) Valencia | £5 million | 22 July 2006 |
| 29 | DF | (Germany) Robert Huth | (England) Middlesbrough | £6 million | 31 August 2006 |
| 13 | DF | (France) William Gallas | (England) Arsenal | Cole – £5 million | 31 August 2006 |

=== Overall transfer activity ===
==== Total spending ====
Summer: ▼£56,600,000

Winter: £0,000,000

Total: ▼£56,600,000

==== Income ====
Summer: ▲£31,000,000

Winter: £0,000,000

Total: ▲£31,000,000

==== Expenditure ====
Summer: ▼£25,800,000

Winter: £0,000,000

Total: ▼£25,800,000

== Competitions ==
=== FA Community Shield ===
| 13 August 2006 | Chelsea | 1–2 | Liverpool | Cardiff |
| 14:00 BST | Shevchenko 43'; Ballack (yellow card) 7'; Lampard (yellow card) 15'; Diarra (yellow card) 68' | Report | Riise 9'; Crouch 80'; Alonso (yellow card) 61' | Stadium: Millennium Stadium; Attendance: 56,275; Referee: Martin Atkinson |

=== Premier League ===
==== League table ====
| Pos | Team | Pld | W | D | L | GF | GA | GD | Pts | Qualification or relegation |
|---|---|---|---|---|---|---|---|---|---|---|
| 1 | Manchester United (C) | 38 | 28 | 5 | 5 | 83 | 27 | +56 | 89 | Qualification for the Champions League group stage |
| 2 | Chelsea | 38 | 24 | 11 | 3 | 64 | 24 | +40 | 83 | Qualification for the Champions League group stage |
| 3 | Liverpool | 38 | 20 | 8 | 10 | 57 | 27 | +30 | 68 | Qualification for the Champions League third qualifying round |
| 4 | Arsenal | 38 | 19 | 11 | 8 | 63 | 35 | +28 | 68 | Qualification for the Champions League third qualifying round |
| 5 | Tottenham Hotspur | 38 | 17 | 9 | 12 | 57 | 54 | +3 | 60 | Qualification for the UEFA Cup first round (Note: Since both finalists of the FA Cup (Manchester United and Chelsea) and the League Cup winners (Chelsea) were qualified for the Champions League, their UEFA Cup spots were given to the 6th- and 7th-placed Premier League teams.) |

Source: Barclays Premier League
Rules for classification: 1) points; 2) goal difference; 3) number of goals scored.
(C) Champions

==== Position by round ====
| Round | 1 | 2 | 3 | 4 | 5 | 6 | 7 | 8 | 9 | 10 | 11 | 12 | 13 | 14 | 15 | 16 | 17 | 18 | 19 | 20 | 21 | 22 | 23 | 24 | 25 | 26 | 27 | 28 | 29 | 30 | 31 | 32 | 33 | 34 | 35 | 36 | 37 | 38 |
|---|---|---|---|---|---|---|---|---|---|---|---|---|---|---|---|---|---|---|---|---|---|---|---|---|---|---|---|---|---|---|---|---|---|---|---|---|---|---|
| Ground | H | A | A | H | H | A | H | A | H | A | A | H | H | A | A | H | H | A | A | H | H | A | H | A | H | A | H | A | A | H | A | H | A | A | H | A | H | H |
| Result | W | L | W | W | W | W | D | W | W | W | L | W | W | D | W | D | W | W | W | D | D | D | W | L | W | W | W | W | W | W | W | W | W | D | D | D | D | D |
| Position | 2 | 9 | 6 | 4 | 3 | 1 | 2 | 2 | 2 | 2 | 2 | 2 | 2 | 2 | 2 | 2 | 2 | 2 | 2 | 2 | 2 | 2 | 2 | 2 | 2 | 2 | 2 | 2 | 2 | 2 | 2 | 2 | 2 | 2 | 2 | 2 | 2 | 2 |

Source: Premier League
A = Away; H = Home; W = Win; D = Draw; L = Loss; = Qualification for the Champions League group stage; = Qualification for the Champions League third qualifying round; = Qualification for the UEFA Cup first round; = Qualification for the Intertoto Cup third round; = Relegation to Football League Championship

==== Matches ====
| 20 August 2006 1 | Chelsea | 3–0 | Manchester City | Fulham (West London) |
| 16:00 BST | Terry 11'; Lampard 26'; Essien (yellow card) 63'; Drogba 78' | (Report) | Dabo (yellow card) 15'; Corradi (yellow card) 49' (yellow-red card) 63'; Dickov (yellow card) 71' | Stadium: Stamford Bridge; Attendance: 41,953; Referee: Steve Bennett |

| 23 August 2006 2 | Middlesbrough | 2–1 | Chelsea | Riverside Stadium, Middlesbrough |
| 20:00 | Parnaby (yellow card) 76'; Pogatetz 80'; Boateng (yellow card) 88'; Viduka 90' | (Report) | Shevchenko 16'; Drogba (yellow card) 46'; Ferreira (yellow card) 80' | Attendance: 29,198; Referee: Howard Webb |

| 27 August 2006 3 | Blackburn Rovers | 0–2 | Chelsea | Ewood Park, Blackburn |
| 16:00 | Savage (yellow card) 25'; Ooijer (yellow card) 49'; Khizanishvili (yellow card) 90' | (Report) | Lampard 50' (pen.); Makelele (yellow card) 66'; Drogba 81' | Attendance: 19,398; Referee: Mark Clattenburg |

| 9 September 2006 4 | Chelsea | 2–1 | Charlton Athletic | Fulham (West London) |
| 15:00 | Drogba 6'; Ballack (yellow card) 41'; Carvalho (yellow card) 59' (goal) 63' | (Report) | Faye (yellow card) 41'; Hasselbaink 54' | Stadium: Stamford Bridge; Attendance: 41,194; Referee: Alan Wiley |

| 17 September 2006 5 | Chelsea | 1–0 | Liverpool | Fulham (West London) |
| 13:30 | Boulahrouz (yellow card) 26'; Drogba (yellow card) 30', (goal) 42'; Ballack (red card) 51'; Čech (yellow card) 90' | (Report) | Warnock (yellow card) 5'; Sissoko (yellow card) 44' | Stadium: Stamford Bridge; Attendance: 41,882; Referee: Mike Riley |

| 23 September 2006 6 | Fulham | 0–2 | Chelsea | Craven Cottage, London |
| 15:00 | Volz (yellow card) 55'; Queudrue (yellow card) 83' | (Report) | Carvalho (yellow card) 61'; Lampard 73' (pen.), 80' | Attendance: 24,290; Referee: Mark Halsey |

| 30 September 2006 7 | Chelsea | 1–1 | Aston Villa | Fulham (West London) |
| 15:00 | Drogba 3' | (Report) | Agbonlahor 45'; McCann (yellow card) 53'; Mellberg (yellow card) 83' | Stadium: Stamford Bridge; Attendance: 41,951; Referee: Graham Poll |

| 14 October 2006 8 | Reading | 0–1 | Chelsea | Madejski Stadium, Reading |
| 17:15 | Ingimarsson (yellow card) 29'; Sonko (yellow card) 45'; Bikey (yellow card) 77' (yellow-red card) 83' | (Report) | Mikel (yellow card) 44' (yellow-red card) 62'; Ingimarsson 45' (o.g.); Terry (yellow card) 53' | Attendance: 24,025; Referee: Mike Riley |

| 21 October 2006 9 | Chelsea | 2–1 | Portsmouth | Fulham (West London) |
| 15:00 | Shevchenko 55', (yellow card) 56'; Ballack 57' (yellow card) 58'; J. Cole (yellow card) 90+3' | (Report) | Pamarot (yellow card) 43'; Mendes (yellow card) 51'; Benjani 69' | Stadium: Stamford Bridge; Attendance: 41,838; Referee: Mark Clattenburg |

| 28 October 2006 10 | Sheffield United | 0–2 | Chelsea | Bramall Lane, Sheffield |
| 12:45 BST | Leigertwood (yellow card) 42'; Montgomery (yellow card) 60' | (Report) | Lampard 43'; Ballack 49' | Attendance: 32,321; Referee: Martin Atkinson |

| 5 November 2006 11 | Tottenham Hotspur | 2–1 | Chelsea | White Hart Lane, Tottenham |
| 16:00 | Dawson (yellow card) 17', (goal) 25'; Lennon 52'; Ghaly (yellow card) 55'; King (yellow card) 78' | (Report) | Makelele 15', (yellow card) 45+3'; Ferreira (yellow card) 25'; A. Cole (yellow card) 45+3'; Terry (yellow card) 62' (yellow-red card) 72'; Ballack (yellow card) 66' | Attendance: 36,070; Referee: Graham Poll |

| 11 November 2006 12 | Chelsea | 4–0 | Watford | Fulham (West London) |
| 15:00 | Drogba 27', 36', 69'; Ballack (yellow card) 40'; Shevchenko 52' | (Report) | Doyley (yellow card) 45' | Stadium: Stamford Bridge; Attendance: 41,936; Referee: Howard Webb |

| 18 November 2006 13 | Chelsea | 1–0 | West Ham United | Fulham (West London) |
| 15:00 | Lampard (yellow card) 18'; Geremi 22' | (Report) | Gabbidon (yellow card) 21'; Reo-Coker (yellow card) 68'; Mullins (yellow card) 71'; Tevez (yellow card) 74' | Stadium: Stamford Bridge; Attendance: 41,916; Referee: Mike Dean |

| 26 November 2006 14 | Manchester United | 1–1 | Chelsea | Old Trafford, Manchester |
| 16:00 | Saha 29'; Carrick (yellow card) 55' | (Report) | Makelele (yellow card) 21'; Drogba (yellow card) 36'; Carvalho 69'; A. Cole (yellow card) 85' | Attendance: 75,948; Referee: Howard Webb |

| 29 November 2006 15 | Bolton Wanderers | 0–1 | Chelsea | Reebok Stadium, Bolton |
| 20:00 | Campo (yellow card) 34'; Faye (yellow card) 45+4'; Nolan (yellow card) 89' | (Report) | Carvalho (yellow card) 40'; Ballack 45' | Attendance: 23,559; Referee: Steve Bennett |

| 10 December 2006 16 | Chelsea | 1–1 | Arsenal | Fulham (West London) |
| 16:00 | A. Cole (yellow card) 24'; Drogba (yellow card) 66'; Essien 84' | (Report) | Flamini (yellow card) 55' (goal) 78'; Lehmann (yellow card) 65' | Stadium: Stamford Bridge; Attendance: 41,917; Referee: Alan Wiley |

| 13 December 2006 17 | Chelsea | 1–0 | Newcastle United | Fulham (West London) |
| 19:45 | Essien (yellow card) 62'; Drogba 74'; Makelele (yellow card) 90+4' | (Report) | Ramage (yellow card) 77'; Babayaro (yellow card) 90+1' | Stadium: Stamford Bridge; Attendance: 41,945; Referee: Phil Dowd |

| 17 December 2006 18 | Everton | 2–3 | Chelsea | Goodison Park, Liverpool |
| 13:45 | Arteta 38' (pen.); Yobo 64'; Neville (yellow card) 83' | (Report) | Howard 49' (o.g.); Carvalho (yellow card) 50'; Lampard 81'; Drogba 87' | Attendance: 33,970; Referee: Mark Halsey |

| 23 December 2006 19 | Wigan Athletic | 2–3 | Chelsea | JJB Stadium, Wigan |
| 17:15 | Heskey 45', 75', (yellow card) 72'; De Zeeuw (yellow card) 90+6'; Kilbane (yellow card) 90+6' | (Report) | Lampard 13', (yellow card) 68'; Kalou 31'; Robben (yellow card) 44', (goal) 90+3'; Boulahrouz (yellow card) 47'; Mikel (yellow card) 87' | Attendance: 22,077; Referee: Mike Dean |

| 26 December 2006 20 | Chelsea | 2–2 | Reading | Fulham (West London) |
| 13:00 | Drogba 38', 72'; Ballack (yellow card) 88' | (Report) | Lita 67', (yellow card) 75'; Essien 85' (o.g.) | Stadium: Stamford Bridge; Attendance: 41,885; Referee: Alan Wiley |

| 30 December 2006 21 | Chelsea | 2–2 | Fulham | Fulham (West London) |
| 15:00 | Rosenior 35' (o.g.); Ferreira (yellow card) 45+1'; Drogba 62' | (Report) | Volz 16'; Bocanegra 84'; Queudrue (yellow card) 86' | Stadium: Stamford Bridge; Attendance: 41,926; Referee: Howard Webb |

| 2 January 2007 22 | Aston Villa | 0–0 | Chelsea | Villa Park, Birmingham |
| 20:00 | McCann (yellow card) 45' | (Report) | Drogba (yellow card) 48'; A. Cole (yellow card) 71'; Carvalho (yellow card) 71' | Attendance: 41,006; Referee: Phil Dowd |

| 13 January 2007 23 | Chelsea | 4–0 | Wigan Athletic | Fulham (West London) |
| 15:00 | Lampard 13'; Robben 63'; Kirkland 70' (o.g.); Drogba (yellow card) 75', (goal) 90+2' | (Report) | McCulloch (yellow card) 26'; Cotterill (yellow card) 32'; Haestad (yellow card) 50' | Stadium: Stamford Bridge; Attendance: 40,846; Referee: Martin Atkinson |

| 20 January 2007 24 | Liverpool | 2–0 | Chelsea | Anfield, Liverpool |
| 12:45 | Kuyt 4'; Pennant 18' | (Report) | Ferreira (yellow card) 70' | Attendance: 44,245; Referee: Rob Styles |

| 31 January 2007 25 | Chelsea | 3–0 | Blackburn Rovers | Fulham (West London) |
| 19:45 | Drogba 6'; Lampard 67'; Kalou 90' | (Report) | Samba (yellow card) 86' | Stadium: Stamford Bridge; Attendance: 37,967; Referee: Graham Poll |

| 3 February 2007 26 | Charlton Athletic | 0–1 | Chelsea | The Valley, London |
| 15:00 | | (Report) | Lampard 18'; Diarra (yellow card) 36' | Attendance: 27,111; Referee: Mark Halsey |

| 10 February 2007 27 | Chelsea | 3–0 | Middlesbrough | Fulham (West London) |
| 15:00 | Drogba 45', 83'; Xavier 70' (o.g.) | (Report) | Downing (yellow card) 48' | Stadium: Stamford Bridge; Attendance: 41,699; Referee: Chris Foy |

| 3 March 2007 28 | Portsmouth | 0–2 | Chelsea | Fratton Park, Portsmouth |
| 17:15 | | (Report) | Ballack (yellow card) 25'; Drogba 33'; Makelele (yellow card) 68'; Kalou 82' | Attendance: 20,219; Referee: Mark Halsey |

| 14 March 2007 29 | Manchester City | 0–1 | Chelsea | City of Manchester Stadium, Manchester |
| 20:00 | Hamann (yellow card) 60'; Dunne (yellow card) 68'; Richards (yellow card) 82' | (Report) | Lampard 28' (pen.); Drogba (yellow card) 82'; Ballack (yellow card) 89' | Attendance: 39,429; Referee: Alan Wiley |

| 17 March 2007 30 | Chelsea | 3–0 | Sheffield United | Fulham (West London) |
| 15:00 | Shevchenko 4'; Kalou 17'; Ballack 58' | (Report) | | Stadium: Stamford Bridge; Attendance: 41,897; Referee: Chris Foy |

| 31 March 2007 31 | Watford | 0–1 | Chelsea | Vicarage Road, Watford |
| 17:15 | Francis (yellow card) 24' | (Report) | Wright-Phillips (yellow card) 66'; Ferreira (yellow card) 76'; Carvalho (yellow card) 90+1'; Kalou 90+2' | Attendance: 19,793; Referee: Uriah Rennie |

| 7 April 2007 32 | Chelsea | 1–0 | Tottenham Hotspur | Fulham (West London) |
| 12:45 | Carvalho 52'; J. Cole (yellow card) 90+5'; Drogba (yellow card) 90+5' | (Report) | Ghaly (yellow card) 17' | Stadium: Stamford Bridge; Attendance: 41,864; Referee: Rob Styles |

| 18 April 2007 33 | West Ham United | 1–4 | Chelsea | Boleyn Ground, London |
| 20:00 | Reo-Coker (yellow card) 12'; Neill (yellow card) 15'; Tevez 35'; Mullins (yellow card) 77'; McCartney (yellow card) 82'; Boa Morte (yellow card) 88' | (Report) | Diarra (yellow card) 20'; Wright-Phillips 31', 36'; Kalou 52'; Drogba (yellow card) 52', (goal) 62' | Attendance: 34,966; Referee: Mike Dean |

| 22 April 2007 34 | Newcastle United | 0–0 | Chelsea | St James' Park, Newcastle |
| 13:30 | | (Report) | Essien (yellow card) 67'; Mikel (yellow card) 83'; Lampard (yellow card) 86' | Attendance: 52,056; Referee: Mark Halsey |

| 28 April 2007 35 | Chelsea | 2–2 | Bolton Wanderers | Fulham (West London) |
| 12:45 | Kalou 22'; Jääskeläinen 34' (o.g.) | (Report) | Michalík 19' (yellow card) 56'; Gardner (yellow card) 26'; Davies (yellow card) 50', (goal) 54' | Stadium: Stamford Bridge; Attendance: 41,105; Referee: Rob Styles |

| 6 May 2007 36 | Arsenal | 1–1 | Chelsea | Emirates Stadium, London |
| 16:00 | Gilberto 43' (pen.); Adebayor (yellow card) 49' | (Report) | Mikel (yellow card) 31'; Boulahrouz (red card) 43'; Essien 70', (yellow card) 90+2' | Attendance: 60,102; Referee: Alan Wiley |

| 9 May 2007 37 | Chelsea | 0–0 | Manchester United | Fulham (West London) |
| 20:00 | Mikel (yellow card) 21'; Diarra (yellow card) 51'; Essien (yellow card) 56' | (Report) | Heinze (yellow card) 21'; Lee (yellow card) 46'; Brown (yellow card) 47'; Eagles (yellow card) 58' | Stadium: Stamford Bridge; Attendance: 41,794; Referee: Graham Poll |

| 13 May 2007 38 | Chelsea | 1–1 | Everton | Fulham (West London) |
| 15:00 | Bridge (yellow card) 44'; Drogba 57'; J. Cole (yellow card) 68' | (Report) | Vaughan 50'; Carsley (yellow card) 59' | Stadium: Stamford Bridge; Attendance: 41,746; Referee: Mark Halsey |

=== UEFA Champions League ===
==== Group stage ====
| Pos | Team | Pld | W | D | L | GF | GA | GD | Pts | Qualification | CHE | BAR | BRM | LSO |
|---|---|---|---|---|---|---|---|---|---|---|---|---|---|---|
| 1 | (England) Chelsea | 6 | 4 | 1 | 1 | 10 | 4 | +6 | 13 | Advance to knockout stage | — | 1–0 | 2–0 | 2–0 |
| 2 | (Spain) Barcelona | 6 | 3 | 2 | 1 | 12 | 4 | +8 | 11 | Advance to knockout stage | 2–2 | — | 2–0 | 5–0 |
| 3 | (Germany) Werder Bremen | 6 | 3 | 1 | 2 | 7 | 5 | +2 | 10 | Transfer to UEFA Cup | 1–0 | 1–1 | — | 2–0 |
| 4 | (Bulgaria) Levski Sofia | 6 | 0 | 0 | 6 | 1 | 17 | −16 | 0 | | 1–3 | 0–2 | 0–3 | — |

Source: RSSSF

| 12 September 2006 1 | Chelsea (England) | 2–0 | (Germany) Werder Bremen | London, England |
| 19:45 BST | Essien 24'; Ballack 68' (pen.) | Report | | Stadium: Stamford Bridge; Attendance: 32,135; Referee: Kyros Vassaras (Greece) |

| 27 September 2006 2 | Levski Sofia (Bulgaria) | 1–3 | (England) Chelsea | Sofia, Bulgaria |
| 19:45 BST | Ognyanov 89' | Report | Drogba 39', 52', 68' | Stadium: Vasil Levski National Stadium; Attendance: 28,000; Referee: Laurent Duhamel (France) |

| 18 October 2006 3 | Chelsea (England) | 1–0 | (Spain) Barcelona | London, England |
| 19:45 BST | Drogba 47' | Report | | Stadium: Stamford Bridge; Attendance: 40,599; Referee: Frank De Bleeckere (Belgium) |

| 31 October 2006 4 | Barcelona (Spain) | 2–2 | (England) Chelsea | Barcelona, Spain |
| 19:45 BST | Deco 3'; Guðjohnsen 58' | Report | Lampard 52'; Drogba 90+3' | Stadium: Camp Nou; Attendance: 98,000; Referee: Stefano Farina (Italy) |

| 22 November 2006 5 | Werder Bremen (Germany) | 1–0 | (England) Chelsea | Bremen, Germany |
| 19:45 GMT | Mertesacker 27' | Report | | Stadium: Weserstadion; Attendance: 40,000; Referee: Ľuboš Micheľ (Slovakia) |

| 5 December 2006 6 | Chelsea (England) | 2–0 | (Bulgaria) Levski Sofia | London, England |
| 19:45 GMT | Shevchenko 27'; Wright-Phillips 83' | Report | | Stadium: Stamford Bridge; Attendance: 33,383; Referee: Alain Hamer (Luxembourg) |

==== Knockout phase ====
===== Round of 16 =====
| 21 February 2007 First leg | Porto (Portugal) | 1–1 | (England) Chelsea | Porto, Portugal |
| 19:45 GMT | Meireles 12' | Report | Shevchenko 16' | Stadium: Estádio do Dragão; Attendance: 49,000; Referee: Massimo Busacca (Switzerland) |

| 6 March 2007 Second leg | Chelsea (England) | 2–1 (3–2 agg.) | (Portugal) Porto | London, England |
| 19:45 GMT | Robben 48'; Ballack 78' | Report | Quaresma 15' | Stadium: Stamford Bridge; Attendance: 39,041; Referee: Roberto Rosetti (Italy) |

===== Quarter-finals =====
| 4 April 2007 First leg | Chelsea (England) | 1–1 | (Spain) Valencia | London, England |
| 19:45 GMT | Drogba 53' | Report | Silva 30' | Stadium: Stamford Bridge; Attendance: 38,065; Referee: Frank De Bleeckere (Belgium) |

| 10 April 2007 Second leg | Valencia (Spain) | 1–2 (2–3 agg.) | (England) Chelsea | Valencia, Spain |
| 19:45 GMT | Morientes 32' | Report | Shevchenko 52'; Essien 90' | Stadium: Estadio Mestalla; Attendance: 53,000; Referee: Kyros Vassaras (Greece) |

===== Semi-finals =====
| 25 April 2007 First leg | Chelsea (England) | 1–0 | (England) Liverpool | London, England |
| 19:45 GMT | J. Cole 29' | Report | | Stadium: Stamford Bridge; Attendance: 39,483; Referee: Markus Merk (Germany) |

| 1 May 2007 Second leg | Liverpool (England) | 1–0 (a.e.t.) (1–1 agg.) (4–1 p) | (England) Chelsea | Liverpool, England |
| 19:45 GMT | Agger 22' | Report | | Stadium: Anfield; Attendance: 42,554; Referee: Manuel Mejuto González (Spain) |
| | Penalties |
| | Zenden (penalty scored); Alonso (penalty scored); Gerrard (penalty scored); Kuyt (penalty scored) | | (penalty missed) Robben; (penalty scored) Lampard; (penalty missed) Geremi |

=== Football League Cup ===
==== Third round ====
| 25 October 2006 Third round | Blackburn Rovers | 0–2 | Chelsea | Ewood Park, Blackburn |
| | | (Report) | J. Cole 53'; Kalou 81' | Attendance: 14,732 |

==== Fourth round ====
| 8 November 2006 | Chelsea | 4–0 | Aston Villa | Stamford Bridge, London |
| | Lampard 32'; Shevchenko 65'; Essien 82'; Drogba 84' | (report) | | Attendance: 41,516; Referee: Mark Halsey |

==== Quarterfinals ====
| 20 December 2006 | Newcastle United | 0–1 | Chelsea | St James' Park, Newcastle upon Tyne |
| | | (report) | Drogba 79' | Attendance: 37,406; Referee: Chris Foy |

==== Semifinals ====
| 10 January 2007 1 | Wycombe Wanderers | 1–1 | Chelsea | Adams Park, High Wycombe |
| | Easter 77' | (report) | Bridge 36' | Attendance: 9,771; Referee: Steve Bennett |

| 23 January 2007 2 | Chelsea | 4–0 | Wycombe Wanderers | Stamford Bridge, London |
| | Shevchenko 22', 43'; Lampard 69', 90' | (report) | | Attendance: 41,591; Referee: Mike Dean |

==== Final ====
| 25 February 2007 | Arsenal | 1–2 | Chelsea | Millennium Stadium, Cardiff |
| 15:00 | Walcott 12' | (Report) | Drogba 20', 84' | Attendance: 70,073; Referee: Howard Webb; Man of the Match: (Ivory Coast) Didier Drogba |

=== FA Cup ===
==== Third round ====
| 6 January 2007 | Chelsea | 6–1 | Macclesfield Town | Stamford Bridge, London |
| 15:00 GMT | Lampard 17', 41', 51' (pen.); Shevchenko (yellow card) 45+2'; Wright-Phillips 68'; A.Cole (yellow card) 78'; Mikel (yellow card) 26', (goal) 82'; Carvalho 86' | (Report) | Navarro (yellow card) 37'; Murphy 40'; Lee (red card) 48' | Attendance: 41,434; Referee: Lee Mason |

==== Fourth round ====
| 28 January 2007 | Chelsea | 3–0 | Nottingham Forest | Stamford Bridge, London |
| 14:00 GMT | Shevchenko 9'; Drogba 18'; Mikel 45' | (Report) | Clingan (yellow card) 65'; Lester (yellow card) 90+1' | Attendance: 41,516; Referee: Alan Wiley |

==== Fifth round ====
| 17 February 2007 Fifth round | Chelsea | 4–0 | Norwich City | Stamford Bridge, London |
| | Wright-Phillips 39'; Drogba 51'; Essien 90'; Shevchenko 90' | (Report) | | Attendance: 41,537; Referee: Rob Styles |

==== Sixth round ====
| 11 March 2007 | Chelsea | 3–3 | Tottenham Hotspur | Stamford Bridge, London |
| 12:45 | Lampard 22', 71'; Kalou 86' | (Report) | Berbatov 5'; Essien 28' (o.g.); Ghaly 36' | Attendance: 41,517; Referee: Mike Riley |

| 19 March 2007 Replay | Tottenham Hotspur | 1–2 | Chelsea | White Hart Lane, London |
| 20:05 | Keane 76' (pen.) | (Report) | Shevchenko 54'; Wright-Phillips 61' | Attendance: 35,519; Referee: Martin Atkinson |

==== Semifinals ====
| 15 April 2007 | Blackburn Rovers | 1–2 (a.e.t.) | Chelsea | Old Trafford, Manchester |
| 16:00 | Roberts 64' | (Report) | Lampard 16'; Ballack 109' | Attendance: 50,559; Referee: Alan Wiley |

==== Final ====
| 19 May 2007 | Chelsea | 1–0 (a.e.t.) | Manchester United | Wembley Stadium, London |
| 15:00 | Drogba 116' | (Report) | | Attendance: 89,826; Referee: Steve Bennett; Man of the Match: (England) Frank Lampard |

== Statistics ==
=== Appearances and goals ===
| No. | Pos | Nat | Player | Total | | Premier League | | Champions League | | FA Cup | | League Cup | |
| No. | Pos | Nat | Player | Apps | Goals | Apps | Goals | Apps | Goals | Apps | Goals | Apps | Goals |
|---|---|---|---|---|---|---|---|---|---|---|---|---|---|
| 1 | GK | (Czech Republic) CZE | Petr Čech | 36 | 0 | 20 | 0 | 8 | 0 | 6 | 0 | 2 | 0 |
| 20 | DF | (Portugal) POR | Paulo Ferreira | 37 | 0 | 18+6 | 0 | 4+2 | 0 | 4+1 | 0 | 2 | 0 |
| 6 | DF | (Portugal) POR | Ricardo Carvalho | 50 | 4 | 31 | 3 | 10 | 0 | 5 | 1 | 4 | 0 |
| 26 | DF | (England) ENG | John Terry | 44 | 1 | 27+1 | 1 | 10 | 0 | 4 | 0 | 2 | 0 |
| 3 | DF | (England) ENG | Ashley Cole | 40 | 0 | 21+2 | 0 | 9 | 0 | 4+1 | 0 | 3 | 0 |
| 13 | MF | (Germany) GER | Michael Ballack | 45 | 8 | 23+3 | 5 | 10 | 2 | 3 | 1 | 5+1 | 0 |
| 5 | MF | (Ghana) GHA | Michael Essien | 54 | 6 | 33 | 2 | 10 | 2 | 4+1 | 1 | 6 | 1 |
| 4 | MF | (France) FRA | Claude Makélélé | 46 | 1 | 26+3 | 1 | 8+1 | 0 | 2 | 0 | 6 | 0 |
| 8 | MF | (England) ENG | Frank Lampard | 61 | 21 | 36+1 | 11 | 11 | 1 | 7 | 6 | 3+3 | 3 |
| 11 | FW | (Ivory Coast) CIV | Didier Drogba | 59 | 33 | 32+4 | 20 | 12 | 6 | 6 | 3 | 3+2 | 4 |
| 7 | FW | (Ukraine) UKR | Andriy Shevchenko | 50 | 13 | 22+8 | 4 | 9+1 | 3 | 5+1 | 3 | 4 | 3 |
| 40 | GK | (Portugal) POR | Henrique Hilário | 18 | -16 | 11 | -12 | 3 | -2 | 1 | -1 | 3 | -1 |
| 21 | FW | (Ivory Coast) CIV | Salomon Kalou | 57 | 9 | 19+14 | 7 | 2+9 | 0 | 1+6 | 1 | 3+3 | 1 |
| 18 | DF | (England) ENG | Wayne Bridge | 32 | 1 | 17+5 | 0 | 3 | 0 | 3 | 0 | 4 | 1 |
| 16 | MF | (Netherlands) NED | Arjen Robben | 36 | 3 | 16+5 | 2 | 3+5 | 1 | 2+2 | 0 | 2+1 | 0 |
| 14 | MF | (Cameroon) CMR | Geremi | 27 | 1 | 15+4 | 1 | 1+1 | 0 | 3 | 0 | 3 | 0 |
| 24 | MF | (England) ENG | Shaun Wright-Phillips | 43 | 6 | 13+14 | 2 | 0+6 | 1 | 5+2 | 3 | 1+2 | 0 |
| 12 | MF | (Nigeria) NGR | Mikel John Obi | 41 | 2 | 10+12 | 0 | 6+3 | 0 | 5+1 | 2 | 3+1 | 0 |
| 9 | DF | (Netherlands) NED | Khalid Boulahrouz | 23 | 0 | 10+3 | 0 | 5 | 0 | 1+1 | 0 | 3 | 0 |
| 19 | MF | (France) FRA | Lassana Diarra | 22 | 0 | 7+3 | 0 | 4+1 | 0 | 4 | 0 | 2+1 | 0 |
| 23 | GK | (Italy) ITA | Carlo Cudicini | 10 | -4 | 7+1 | -3 | 1 | -1 | 0 | 0 | 1 | 0 |
| 10 | MF | (England) ENG | Joe Cole | 24 | 2 | 3+10 | 0 | 3+4 | 1 | 2 | 0 | 1+1 | 1 |
| 49 | FW | (England) ENG | Scott Sinclair | 3 | 0 | 1+1 | 0 | 0 | 0 | 0 | 0 | 0+1 | 0 |
| 47 | FW | (Israel) ISR | Ben Sahar | 5 | 0 | 0+3 | 0 | 0 | 0 | 0+1 | 0 | 0+1 | 0 |
| 33 | DF | (Portugal) POR | Nuno Morais | 5 | 0 | 0+2 | 0 | 0 | 0 | 0+2 | 0 | 0+1 | 0 |
| 51 | DF | (England) ENG | Sam Hutchinson | 1 | 0 | 0+1 | 0 | 0 | 0 | 0 | 0 | 0 | 0 |
| 48 | MF | (England) ENG | Michael Woods | 2 | 0 | 0 | 0 | 0 | 0 | 0+2 | 0 | 0 | 0 |

== Summary ==
| Games played | 64 (38 Premier League), 7 (FA Cup), 12 (UEFA Champions League) 6 (Football League Cup) & 1 (Community Shield) |
| Games won | 42 (24 Premier League), 6 (FA Cup), 7 (UEFA Champions League) 5 (Football League Cup) & 0 (Community Shield) |
| Games drawn | 16 (11 Premier League), 1 (FA Cup), 3 (UEFA Champions League) 1 (Football League Cup) & 0 (Community Shield) |
| Games lost | 6 (3 Premier League), 0 (FA Cup), 2 (UEFA Champions League) 0 (Football League Cup & 1 (Community Shield) |
| Goals scored | 117 (64 Premier League), 21 (FA Cup), 17 (UEFA Champions League) 14 (Football League Cup) & 1 (Community Shield) |
| Goals conceded | 43 (24 Premier League), 6 (FA Cup), 9 (UEFA Champions League) 2 (Football League Cup) & 2 (Community Shield) |
| Goal difference | +71 +40 (Premier League), +15 (FA Cup), +8 (UEFA Champions League) +12 (Football League Cup) & -1 (Community Shield) |
| Clean sheets | 35 (22 Premier League), 3 (FA Cup), 4 (UEFA Champions League) 4 (Football League Cup) & 0 (Community Shield) |
| Most appearances | 62 (England) Frank Lampard |
| Top scorer | 33 (Ivory Coast) Didier Drogba |
| Points | Overall: 142/186 (76.34%) |

== Related media ==
Chelsea supporter Mark Worrall chronicled the 2006–07 season in his critically acclaimed book One Man Went To Mow, which was first published in January 2008 and documented the manager José Mourinho's last full season as manager at Stamford Bridge.
