= Lassana Diarra =

French footballer (born 1985)

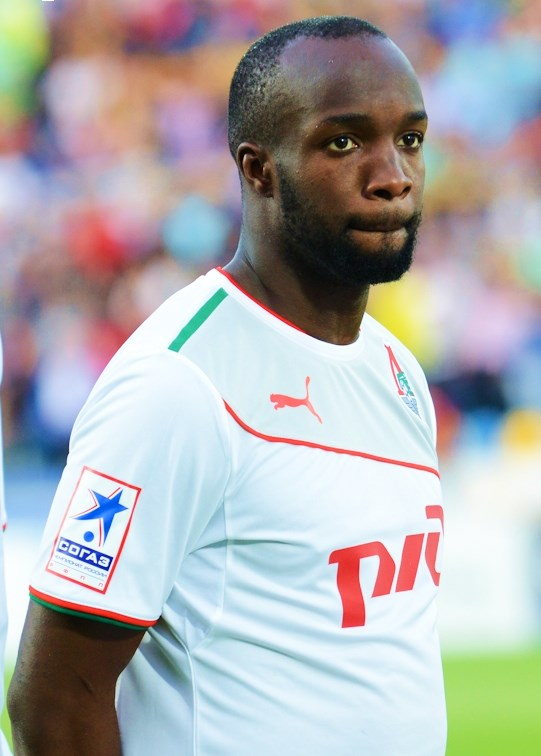
- Diarra with Lokomotiv Moscow in 2014

Personal information
- Full name: Lassana Diarra
- Date of birth: 10 March 1985 (age 41)
- Place of birth: Paris, France
- Height: 1.73 m (5 ft 8 in)
- Position: Defensive midfielder

Youth career
- 1998–1999: Paris FC
- 1999–2001: Nantes
- 2001–2002: Le Mans
- 2002–2003: Red Star 93
- 2003–2004: Le Havre

Senior career*
Years	Team	Apps	(Gls)
2004–2005	Le Havre	29	(0)
2005–2007	Chelsea	13	(0)
2007–2008	Arsenal	7	(0)
2008–2009	Portsmouth	24	(1)
2009–2012	Real Madrid	87	(1)
2012–2013	Anzhi Makhachkala	18	(0)
2013–2014	Lokomotiv Moscow	17	(1)
2015–2017	Marseille	37	(1)
2017	Al Jazira	5	(0)
2018–2019	Paris Saint-Germain	13	(0)
Total		250	(4)

International career
2005–2006	France U21	18	(0)
2007–2016	France	34	(0)
- * Club domestic league appearances and goals

Lassana "Lass" Diarra (born 10 March 1985) is a French former professional footballer who played as a defensive midfielder.

Diarra spent his club career at Chelsea, Arsenal, Portsmouth, Real Madrid and Paris Saint-Germain, in addition to two Russian outfits – Anzhi Makhachkala and Lokomotiv Moscow, before retiring in 2019. He was also a French international with 34 caps between 2007 and 2016.

== Early life ==
Born in Paris to Malian parents, Diarra began playing football at the sports center on Rue Julien-Lacroix in Belleville, the district in which he grew up in the 20th arrondissement of Paris. After having started his youth club career at Paris FC, Diarra was turned down by multiple football clubs as a youngster; Nantes deemed him too "small and lightweight" to succeed at 170 cm and 58 kg (5'7" and 9 stone). He admitted he thought his "football career was over." His next stop was Le Mans UC, where Diarra claimed they "didn't seem to care" about him. He would also play shortly for Red Star 93 from the Paris-suburb of Saint-Ouen-sur-Seine.

== Club career ==
=== Le Havre ===
Diarra's footballing career began at Le Havre, a former French top-flight football team. Outstanding in his defensive midfield role, his reputation started to grow and impressive performances saw his selection to the French under-21 squad. Along with the reputation came interest from other clubs, and Chelsea became potential suitors. With Chelsea's Claude Makélélé getting older, Chelsea's scouts tagged Diarra as the "new Makélélé". Diarra was spotted by Gwyn Williams playing for France in the 2005 Toulon Tournament and initially came on trial, before the club paid £1 million for his services in July 2005.

=== Chelsea ===
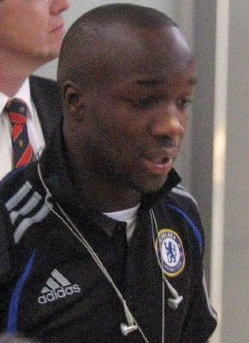
Diarra during his time at Chelsea.

Diarra was in Chelsea's first team squad in the 2005–06 season, but did not see much first-team football. His Chelsea debut came in the UEFA Champions League in October 2005, when he was given a brief run out as a substitute when Chelsea were 4–0 up against Real Betis. Learning from Claude Makélélé he played well against Huddersfield Town in the FA Cup third round, winning rave reviews from both managers, teammates, and media sources. He made his league debut when he came on as a substitute for Makélélé on 5 February 2006 in a 2–0 win over Liverpool. He became a bit part player in Chelsea's first team and also completed the full 90 minutes in Chelsea's last two games of the season at Blackburn Rovers and Newcastle United respectively, as manager José Mourinho rotated his squad. This meant Diarra ended the season with three league appearances as Chelsea won the 2005–06 FA Premier League. Diarra was named Chelsea's Young Player of the Season for 2005–06.

Due to Chelsea's defensive injury setbacks during the 2006–07 season, he was often asked to play at right back. He played full Premier League games against Blackburn, Charlton Athletic and Middlesbrough, with some success. He also started in Chelsea's win over Arsenal in the League Cup Final at the Millennium Stadium. He was an unused substitute as Chelsea won the 2007 FA Cup Final against Manchester United. On 29 July, reports surfaced suggesting he could be on his way to Arsenal in pursuit of first-team football. Despite this, he came on as a substitute for Chelsea in the 2007 FA Community Shield. His contract with Chelsea was due to expire in January 2008, and having made no move to extend it, Chelsea sold him to Arsenal on 31 August 2007, before he could leave on a free transfer.

=== Arsenal ===
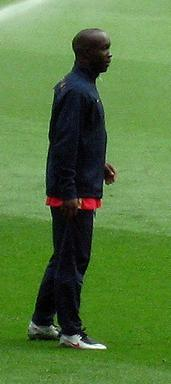
Diarra training during his time at Arsenal.

On 31 August 2007, transfer deadline day, he signed for Arsenal for an undisclosed fee. He was given the number 8 shirt, vacated by the departure of winger Freddie Ljungberg. On his move across London, he cited Gunners manager Arsène Wenger as one of the main reasons for joining the club, along with the style of football played by Arsenal. Wenger had called the young Frenchman a "multi-functional player", and a good addition to the squad. Diarra made his Arsenal debut as a late substitute in the home leg of the 2007–08 Champions League group stage match against Sevilla, and his full debut against Newcastle United in the third round of the League Cup. He then started his first Premier League match for Arsenal against Wigan Athletic on 24 November 2007. With the emergence of defensive midfielder Mathieu Flamini in the Arsenal side, Diarra saw only limited action in the early months of the season. Having expressed concerns that he was not playing enough first team football, Diarra signed for Portsmouth in January 2008 after only five months at Arsenal for an undisclosed fee believed to be around £5.5 million.

=== Portsmouth ===
Diarra signed for Portsmouth on 17 January 2008. He was given his first start against Derby County, contributing to a 3–1 win at Fratton Park. He scored his first goal for the club in the following match, against FA Cup Fourth Round Championship opponents Plymouth Argyle, and his first Premier League goal two weeks later, a controversial late winner against Bolton Wanderers. Diarra went on to play in every minute of Portsmouth's remaining FA Cup matches en route to claiming the trophy in the final. He topped the season by being included in the France squad for UEFA Euro 2008; this and the FA Cup win arguably vindicated his decision to part company with Arsenal, Diarra himself saying that it had "more than justified my decision." He played in the 2008 Community Shield against Manchester United, missing in the penalty shootout, which was won by United. On 18 September 2008, he scored Pompey's first-ever goal in a major European competition against Vitória de Guimarães, his third and final goal for the club. The first red card of Diarra's Premier League career came on 28 September 2008 when he was booked twice against Tottenham Hotspur at Fratton Park.

=== Real Madrid ===
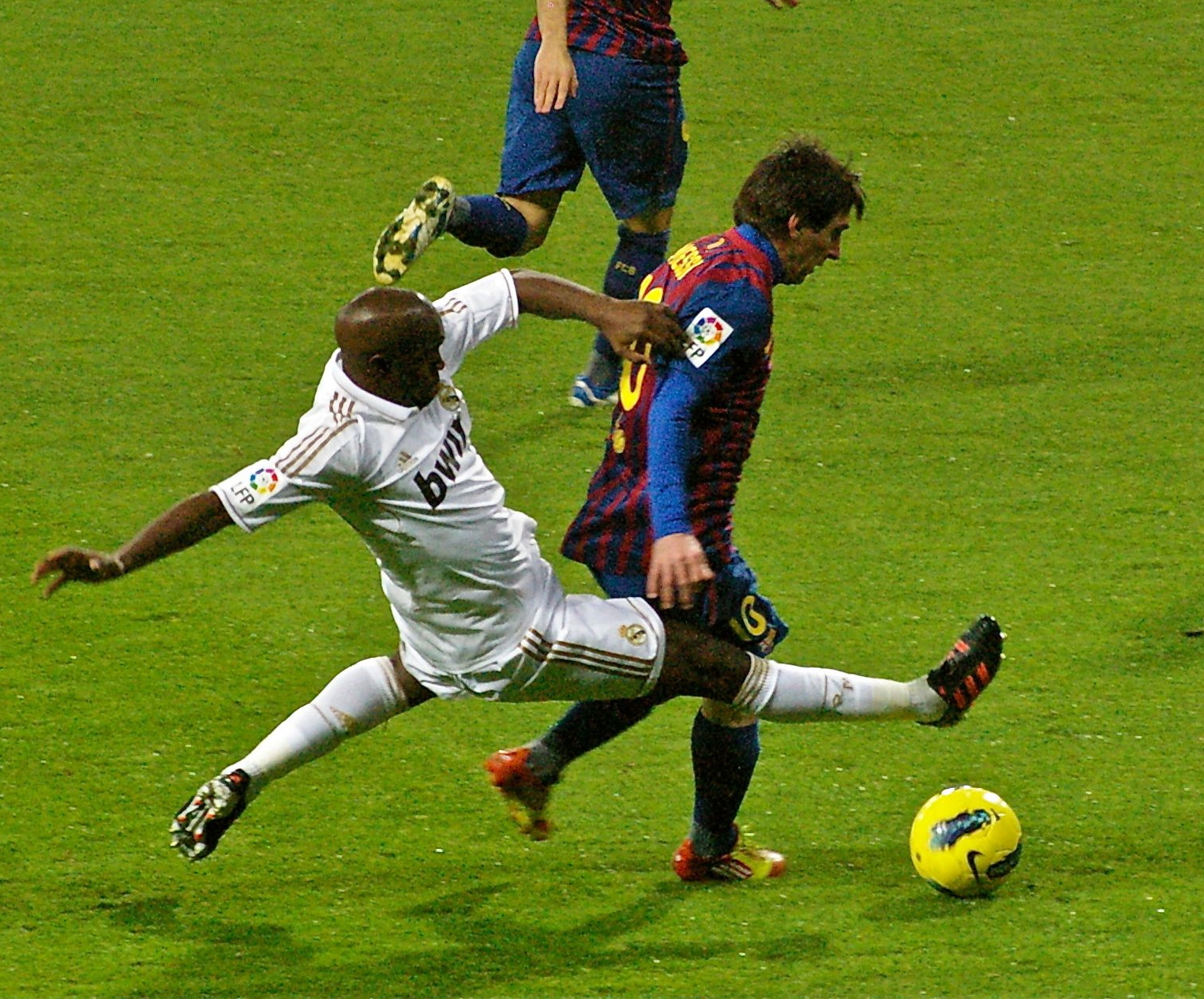
Diarra against Lionel Messi during El Clásico at Santiago Bernabéu Stadium, December 2011

On 17 December 2008, Portsmouth agreed a fee with Real Madrid for the transfer of Diarra on 1 January 2009 for a fee of around €20 million (£18.88 million), subject to a medical. He was assigned the number 6 shirt of Mahamadou Diarra for domestic competitions, as the Malian midfielder was out with a season-ending injury and the vacant number 39 for the Champions League. He wore the name "Lass" on the back of his shirt to avoid confusion with Mahamadou. Lassana Diarra's transfer was officially completed on 1 January 2009, the opening of the transfer window. Madrid had planned to add both Diarra and fellow new signing Klaas-Jan Huntelaar to their 2008–09 Champions League squad, but both players had already featured in the same season's UEFA Cup for previous clubs Portsmouth and Ajax respectively; UEFA rules would allow only one of the pair to be registered by 1 February 2009, and eventually Diarra was selected to play in the competition.

Diarra's performance for Real Madrid in his first few months earned him a spot among the starting eleven on UEFA's 2008–09 La Liga Breakthrough Team. The Madridista joined Sevilla's Diego Perotti as the only foreigner on the list. According to the UEFA website, he "joined Real Madrid in the winter transfer window with a very low profile, although in a few short months he managed to convince the demanding Madridista fan base."

For the 2009–10 season he was assigned the number 10 shirt after Wesley Sneijder moved to Internazionale and Mahamadou Diarra came back from injury and reclaimed the number 6 shirt. Lassana Diarra scored his first official goal for Madrid in the 2009–10 La Liga opener against Deportivo de La Coruña, providing his side with their winning goal in a 3–2 victory.

Manager José Mourinho included Diarra in his starting lineup for the first game of the 2010–11 La Liga season. Because Madrid bought Sami Khedira, Diarra faced further competition to get into the squad. However, Mourinho said he would not be leaving and said that he saw Diarra as a starter.

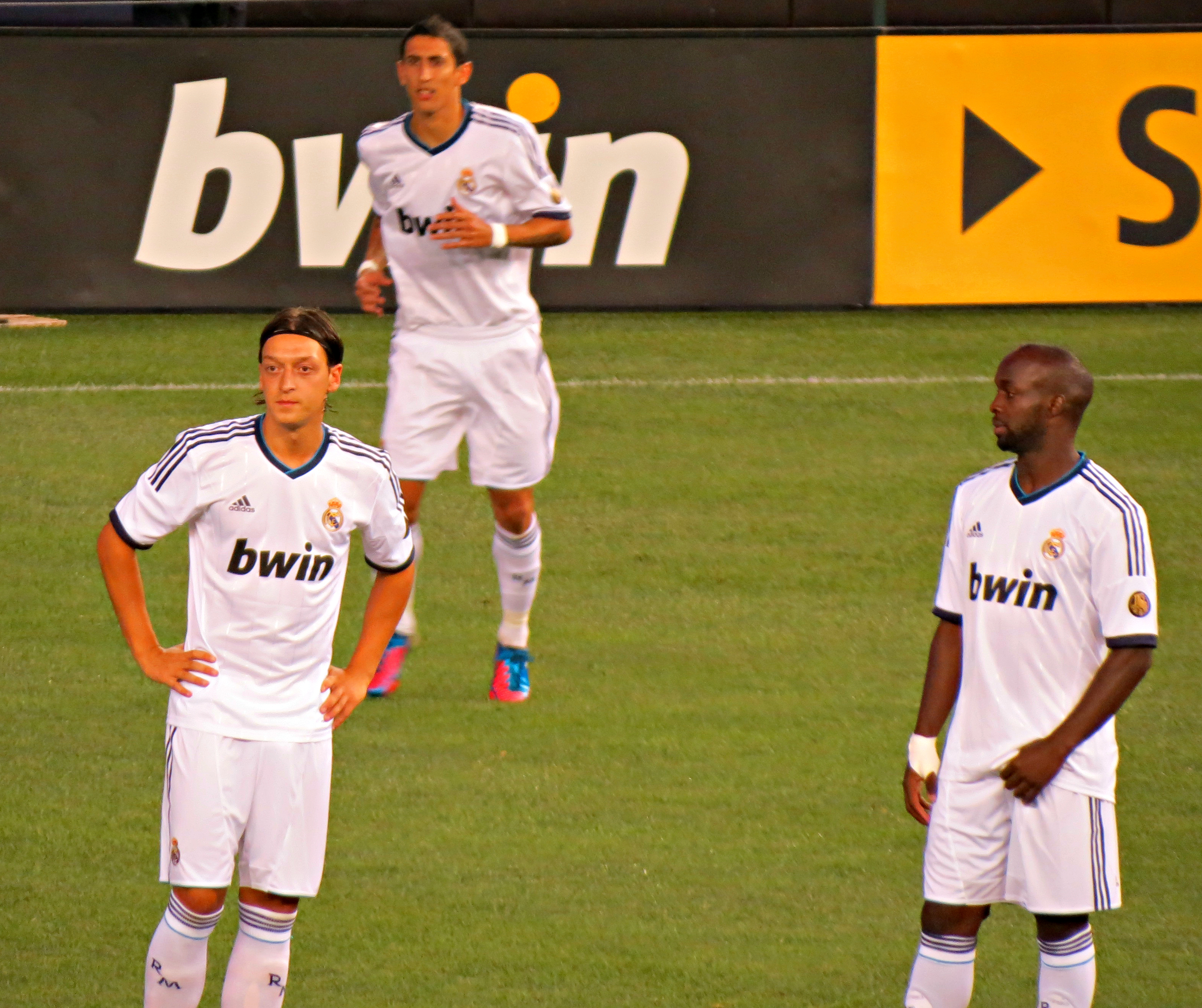
Diarra in 2012 alongside Mesut Özil and Ángel Di María.

After speculation of Diarra leaving Real Madrid during the summer 2011 transfer window, during which he did not participate in the team's pre-season, Diarra finally stayed at the club, wearing the number 24 jersey after Sami Khedira had taken number 6 and Mesut Özil number 10 during the summer.

Diarra had a decent 2011–12 season, culminating in winning the La Liga title with the club. He participated in the team's 2012 pre-season, and won the 2012 Supercopa with the club. It seems he was forced out of the club alongside fellow midfield enforcer Esteban Granero to accommodate the stay of Kaká, despite the latter being linked with an exit.

=== Anzhi Makhachkala ===
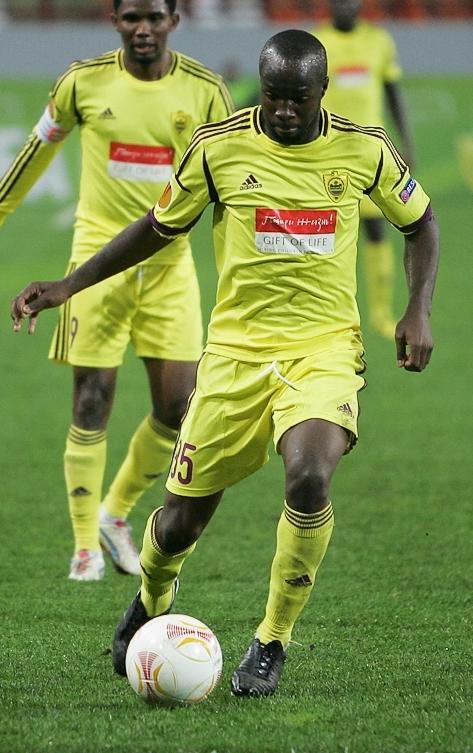
Diarra with Anzhi in 2012

After falling down in the pecking order, Diarra was linked to join Russian side Spartak Moscow. On transfer deadline day, 31 August 2012, Diarra joined Anzhi Makhachkala on a four-year deal for an undisclosed fee. He was originally meant to join merely on loan, but the club decided to make the deal permanent. After joining Anzhi, Diarra made an explanation about why he joined the club, claiming that Samuel Eto'o persuaded him to join and insisted money was not the reason he joined.

=== Lokomotiv Moscow ===
After Anzhi made their whole squad available for transfer due to cost-cutting, there was talk of a number of clubs interested in Diarra's services; Monaco and Paris Saint-Germain were thought to be interested in taking him back to France. However, he eventually signed a four-year contract with Lokomotiv Moscow on 20 August 2013, taking the number 85 shirt. He became the second most expensive transfer in Lokomotiv's history behind only Mbark Boussoufa, who was signed by the club from Anzhi Makhachkala in the summer of 2013 for €15m. Despite being sent off twice in his first matches for his new club against Zenit Saint Petersburg and Tom Tomsk respectively, Diarra quickly established himself in starting eleven, claiming one of two usual holding midfielder's posts alongside Dmitri Tarasov. In his first months at Lokomotiv, Diarra provided so many solid performances that someone even claimed that he was the strongest player in the history of the Russian Premier League. His growing influence in the team became acknowledged: in November and December 2013, he topped the monthly poll among Lokomotiv fans in social networks and received the Player of the Month award twice in a row. After the winter break, Diarra played only five out of eleven matches and his performances were a lot below the usual level.

Things turned sour for Diarra at Lokomotiv in the summer of 2014, when he fell out with head coach Leonid Kuchuk. The club alleged that Diarra then refused to participate in training. Diarra claimed that Lokomotiv wanted to reduce his salary and tried to force him to accept a pay cut. In August 2014, Lokomotiv terminated Diarra's employment at the club for breach of contract on the grounds that he had refused to show up for training. At the time, his contract still had three years left before expiring in 2017. The club then sought damages from Diarra for the breach of contract at FIFA's Dispute and Resolution Chamber (DRC), who found in favour of Lokomotiv and determined that the player owed €10.5 million to his former club. This ruling effectively banned Diarra from playing professionally for another club as long as his contractual dispute with Lokomotiv was not settled. Kuchuk was sacked as head coach by the club in September 2014.

=== Aborted transfers and legal issues ===
After Diarra left Lokomotiv Moscow, there were several months of speculation linking him with numerous European football clubs in 2014, including Celtic, Newcastle United and Queens Park Rangers. He reached contract agreements with Inter Milan and West Ham United in February 2015 but both moves were blocked by FIFA transfer regulations.

Belgian club Sporting Charleroi made a conditional offer to Diarra on the proviso that the player could be registered in the Belgian league without Charleroi being made liable for any costs to Lokomotiv. The Belgian FA were unable to provide these assurances and, after FIFA refused to issue an International Transfer Certificate (ITC), Charleroi withdrew their offer on 19 February 2015. The club's concerns around the transfer related to a paragraph in FIFA's transfer regulations which stated that if a player breaches his contract, and the contract is subsequently terminated by the club, the player's new team is jointly liable to pay compensation to his previous club.

In December 2015, Diarra took legal action against FIFA and the Belgian FA, challenging FIFA's transfer rules on the grounds that they violated his right to free movement within the EU, which allows workers to seek employment in other member states without restrictions.

On 27 May 2016, the Court of Arbitration for Sport (CAS) upheld the decision by FIFA's DRC and Diarra was ordered to pay a 10 million euro fine to Lokomotiv Moscow for breach of contract, along with €110,000 to the CAS. He was also given a 15-month suspension from playing professional football and a suspension of payment of salary, both of which he had already served. In 2017, a court in Charleroi ruled in Diarra's favour after deciding that FIFA and the Belgian FA had infringed upon EU law regarding the freedom of movement.

In a preliminary ruling of 4 October 2024, the Court of Justice of the European Union ruled in favour of Diarra, determining that FIFA's player contract rules violated European Union law. As of October 2024, the main case is still pending at the Cour d'appel de Mons in Belgium. In December 2024, FIFA drafted interim amendments to the organisation's transfer regulations, accepting that they could be open to immediate challenge as a result of the court's decision.

In August 2025, Diarra restarted legal proceedings against FIFA and the Belgian FA after neither body approached him to discuss a settlement.

=== Marseille ===
After serving a 15-month ban from football, Diarra signed for French Ligue 1 side Marseille on 24 July 2015. He made his debut for Marseille on 23 August and scored his first goal in a 6–0 victory over Troyes, while also achieving a 100 percent pass completion. At the end of the 2015–16 season, he was named in the Ligue 1 Team of the Season by the UNFP.

On 11 August 2016, Diarra was named as the club's new captain, replacing Steve Mandanda who had earlier joined Crystal Palace. Following Rudi Garcia's appointment as new Marseille manager in October, however, Diarra's commitment to the club was questioned and he was later stripped of his captaincy in favour of loanee, Bafétimbi Gomis. Having made only 11 league appearances for the season, Diarra was released by Marseille on 14 February 2017. Former manager José Anigo later claimed that the breakdown of relationship between club and player stemmed from then-chairman Vincent Labrune's failure to honour contractual promises to Diarra.

=== Al Jazira ===
On 19 April 2017, Diarra joined Emirati club Al Jazira. He made five appearances in the UAE Pro-League before mutually terminating his contract with the club on 24 December 2017.

=== Paris Saint-Germain ===
On 23 January 2018, Diarra joined Paris Saint-Germain on a one-and-a-half-year contract. The France international has become the 436th player to represent the capital club. He made his debut for the club under coach Unai Emery on 30 January 2018 in the 3–2 Coupe de la Ligue semi-final win against Stade Rennais On 21 February 2019, Diarra and PSG mutually terminated his contract with the club. He subsequently announced his retirement from professional football.

== International career ==
=== Youth team ===
Diarra won 18 caps for the France under-21s. Perhaps his most notable performance came in the 2006 UEFA European Under-21 Championship qualification play-offs second-leg match against England at the Stade Marcel Picot in November 2005. With the match several minutes from full-time and seemingly destined for extra time (the aggregate score was 2–2), he received the ball in the England penalty box, where a challenge from Kieran Richardson brought Diarra down. A penalty was given for the foul, and Diarra's teammate Jimmy Briand scored the penalty, shooting the ball past Scott Carson. France won the tie 3–2 on aggregate and thus qualified for the finals to be held in Portugal.

=== Senior team ===
Diarra was selected for the senior team by coach Raymond Domenech for a UEFA Euro 2008 qualifier away to Lithuania on 24 March 2007. He started the match, alongside Claude Makélélé and Jérémy Toulalan in midfield, and played the full 90 minutes. He was also selected that year for a friendly match against Austria on 28 March 2007. Diarra's consistent club performances in 2008 resulted in him being picked for the France squad for Euro 2008, ahead of high-calibre players such as Djibril Cissé and Mathieu Flamini. France was eliminated in the group stage of Euro 2008 and Diarra did not feature in any of his country's three group stage matches.

Following the international retirement of fellow defensive midfielder Claude Makélélé, Diarra was called up for Domenech's France squad in the 20 August 2008 friendly with Sweden. By the end of the 2010 World Cup qualifying campaign, Diarra had made 26 appearances for France.

On 11 May 2010, Diarra was named to the preliminary squad of Domenech's squad to play in the 2010 FIFA World Cup. He was later named to the shortened list of players and was expected to be a starter alongside Jérémy Toulalan in the midfield. On 22 May, however, while training with the national team in the high-altitude commune of Tignes, it was announced that Diarra was dropping out of the squad due to his suffering severe intestinal pain and stomach cramps as a result of the altitude. A follow-up medical check revealed that Diarra would require rest for an indefinite period. His club, Real Madrid, later revealed that Diarra was resting at home following medical advice due to asthenic syndrome secondary to sickle-cell anemia, a genetic blood disorder characterized by red blood cells that assume an abnormal, rigid, sickle shape.

After an absence of over five years, Diarra received a surprise recall to the French team following a fine run of form at the beginning of the 2015–16 season. Upon announcing his return to the squad, France manager Didier Deschamps highlighted Diarra's performances in a struggling Marseille side as the reason behind his inclusion.

On 12 May 2016, Diarra was named in the France squad for UEFA Euro 2016. On 30 May 2016, he played the first half of the friendly match against Cameroon and was replaced at half-time by N'Golo Kanté. However, Diarra later was forced to pull out of the squad because of a swelling in his left knee. He was replaced by Manchester United's Morgan Schneiderlin.

== Playing style ==
Despite being an aggressive, hard-tackling and hard-working player, Diarra has unusually good ball control for a defensive midfielder, and has been praised for his physical strength in defence, as well as his composure, and strong mentality. Although he is usually deployed in the centre of midfield as a ball-winner, due to his energy, tenacity, and tackling abilities, he is also a creative player who can dictate the tempo of his team's play with his tidy and intelligent passing from deep midfield positions after winning back possession; he is also capable of being an offensive threat due to his ability to get forward and score goals, courtesy of his striking ability from distance. Due to his many attributes and versatility, Madrid's La Sexta television commentators refer to him as a "todocampista," or "jack of all trades", and he has also occasionally played in more advanced midfield roles, or as a right back.

Jimmy Bullard said on facing Diarra: ‘he was a bit like Kanté. When you look at him you think “I can deal with that, he’s fine. He’s 5”2”, I reckon I can handle this”. Unbelievable. What a player he was.’

== Personal life ==
Diarra is a practising Muslim. On 13 November 2015, his cousin Asta Diakité was killed during a series of coordinated terrorist attacks in Paris. At the time, Diarra was playing for France in an international friendly against Germany at the Stade de France, just north of Paris in Saint-Denis.

Diarra grew up supporting Marseille.

== Career statistics ==
=== Club ===
Appearances and goals by club, season and competition
Club	Season	League			National cup (Note: Includes Coupe de France, FA Cup, Copa del Rey, Russian Cup)		League cup (Note: Includes Coupe de la Ligue, Football League Cup)		Continental		Other		Total	
Club	Season	Division	Apps	Goals	Apps	Goals	Apps	Goals	Apps	Goals	Apps	Goals	Apps	Goals
Le Havre	2004–05	Ligue 2	29	0	1	0	1	0	—		—		31	0
Chelsea	2005–06	Premier League	3	0	2	0	0	0	2 (Note: Appearance(s) in UEFA Champions League)	0	0	0	7	0
Chelsea	2006–07	Premier League	10	0	4	0	3	0	5	0	1 (Note: Appearance in FA Community Shield)	0	23	0
Chelsea	2007–08	Premier League	0	0	0	0	0	0	0	0	1	0	1	0
Chelsea	Total		13	0	6	0	3	0	7	0	2	0	31	0
Arsenal	2007–08	Premier League	7	0	0	0	3	0	3	0	—		13	0
Portsmouth	2007–08	Premier League	12	1	5	1	—		—		—		17	2
Portsmouth	2008–09	Premier League	12	0	0	0	0	0	2 (Note: Appearances in UEFA Cup)	1	1	0	15	1
Portsmouth	Total		24	1	5	1	0	0	2	1	1	0	32	3
Real Madrid	2008–09	La Liga	19	0	—		—		2	0	—		21	0
Real Madrid	2009–10	La Liga	23	1	1	0	—		6	0	—		30	1
Real Madrid	2010–11	La Liga	26	0	3	0	—		10	0	—		39	0
Real Madrid	2011–12	La Liga	17	0	4	0	—		4	0	0	0	25	0
Real Madrid	2012–13	La Liga	2	0	0	0	—		0	0	0	0	2	0
Real Madrid	Total		87	1	8	0	0	0	22	0	0	0	117	1
Anzhi Makhachkala	2012–13	Russian Premier League	14	0	3	1	—		7 (Note: Appearances in UEFA Europa League)	0	—		24	1
Anzhi Makhachkala	2013–14	Russian Premier League	4	0	0	0	—		0	0	—		4	0
Anzhi Makhachkala	Total		18	0	3	1	0	0	7	0	0	0	28	1
Lokomotiv Moscow	2013–14	Russian Premier League	17	1	0	0	—		—		—		17	1
Marseille	2015–16	Ligue 1	26	1	2	0	1	0	4	0	—		33	1
Marseille	2016–17	Ligue 1	11	0	0	0	1	0	—		—		12	0
Marseille	Total		37	1	2	0	2	0	4	0	0	0	45	1
Al Jazira	2017–18	UAE Pro League	5	0	0	0	0	0	0	0	0	0	5	0
Paris Saint-Germain	2017–18	Ligue 1	10	0	2	0	2	0	1	0	—		15	0
Paris Saint-Germain	2018–19	Ligue 1	3	0	0	0	0	0	0	0	1 (Note: Appearance in Trophée des Champions)	0	4	0
Paris Saint-Germain	Total		13	0	2	0	2	0	1	0	1	0	19	0
Career total			250	4	27	2	11	0	46	1	4	0	338	7

=== International ===
National team	Year	Apps	Goals
France	2007	9	0
France	2008	7	0
France	2009	10	0
France	2010	2	0
France	2015	3	0
France	2016	3	0
Total		34	0

== Honours ==
Chelsea

- FA Cup: 2006–07
- Football League Cup: 2006–07

Portsmouth

- FA Cup: 2007–08

Real Madrid

- La Liga: 2011–12
- Copa del Rey: 2010–11
- Supercopa de España: 2012

Paris Saint-Germain

- Ligue 1: 2017–18
- Coupe de France: 2017–18
- Coupe de la Ligue: 2017–18
- Trophée des Champions: 2018

Individual

- Chelsea Young Player of the Year: 2005–06
- Ligue 1 Team of the Year: 2015–16
