= Shaun Wright-Phillips =

English footballer (born 1981)

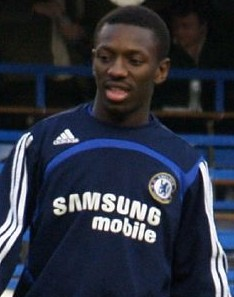
- Wright-Phillips in 2008

Personal information
- Full name: Shaun Cameron Wright-Phillips
- Date of birth: 25 October 1981 (age 45)
- Place of birth: Greenwich, England
- Height: 5 ft 6 in (1.68 m)
- Position: Winger

Youth career
- Ten-em-Bee F.C.
- Nottingham Forest
- –1999: Manchester City

Senior career*
Years	Team	Apps	(Gls)
1999–2005	Manchester City	153	(26)
2005–2008	Chelsea	82	(4)
2008–2011	Manchester City	64	(9)
2011–2015	Queens Park Rangers	67	(1)
2015–2016	New York Red Bulls	21	(1)
2016	New York Red Bulls II	1	(0)
2017	Phoenix Rising FC	26	(3)
Total		413	(44)

International career
2001–2002	England U21	6	(1)
2004–2010	England	36	(6)
- * Club domestic league appearances and goals

Shaun Cameron Wright-Phillips (born 25 October 1981) is an English former professional footballer who played as a winger.

A Nottingham Forest youth product, he spent 13 seasons playing in the Premier League during spells with Manchester City, Chelsea and Queens Park Rangers. In 2015, he joined Major League Soccer club New York Red Bulls alongside his brother, Bradley. He joined Phoenix Rising FC in 2017.

Wright-Phillips scored six goals in 36 appearances for the England national team, which included selection for the 2010 FIFA World Cup.

== Early life ==
Shaun Cameron Wright-Phillips was born on 25 October 1981 in Greenwich, Greater London. He is the adopted son of former England international Ian Wright. Wright adopted the son of then-girlfriend Sharon Phillips, when Shaun was three years old. His younger brother, Bradley Wright-Phillips, is also a professional footballer and the all-time top scorer for the New York Red Bulls. Wright-Phillips grew up in Brockley and attended Haberdashers' Aske's Hatcham College in New Cross Gate. Wright-Phillips is of Trinidadian and Grenadian descent.

== Club career ==
=== Manchester City ===
Wright-Phillips was released by Nottingham Forest aged 17 and Manchester City took him to Maine Road. He made his first-team debut as a 70th-minute substitute in the second leg of a League Cup match against Burnley on 24 August 1999, replacing Terry Cooke. His league debut came on 30 October at Port Vale. Brought on as substitute striker, he helped his team turn a 1–0 deficit into a 2–1 win. His shot resulted in the first Manchester City goal, which Wright-Phillips attempted to claim, though the strike was later credited as an own goal instead. He then started the next two matches in place of Paul Dickov, who was absent through injury. Once Dickov recovered, Wright-Phillips returned to the reserves, making only one further first team appearance that season.

Wright-Phillips featured more regularly than the previous season but was still not fully established in the first team, making 12 starts and seven substitute appearances playing in a variety of attacking positions. Manchester City's stay in the Premier League was brief; at the end of the season they were relegated.

Under Kevin Keegan, Wright-Phillips firmly established himself in the first team, not as a forward, but as a wing-back. Keegan was known for playing attacking football, and decided to use the attacking Wright-Phillips in a traditionally defensive position due to his mobility and dribbling ability. From 2000 to 2003, Wright-Phillips won Manchester City's Young Player of the Year award four times in succession, surpassing Steve Kinsey's record of three times.

His response to comments regarding his success being paved by his father, saying in an interview with manchesteronline.co.uk: "The press brought up my adopted father's name. They relate to his name and that is fine by me – it comes with the name, but I will be my own man. I have made my own path and started to take my own steps."

=== Chelsea ===
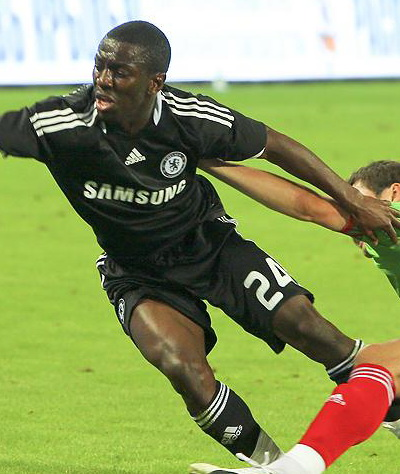
Wright-Phillips playing for Chelsea in 2008

On 18 July 2005, Wright-Phillips completed a £21 million move to Premier League champions Chelsea, returning to his native London. He joined the club on a five-year contract after agreeing to personal terms and passing a medical. He had previously said he would not leave Manchester City. His transfer was at the time the third biggest for an English player, after Rio Ferdinand and Wayne Rooney. He made his debut on 7 August in the 2005 FA Community Shield, as a 69th-minute substitute for Arjen Robben in a 2–1 win over Arsenal.

In October 2006, Wright-Phillips's father criticised Chelsea manager José Mourinho for not playing his son; he had started 12 Premier League games and played the full 90 minutes of none. His first goal for the club came in a 2–0 Champions League win over Levski Sofia on 5 December 2006, in his 52nd match and almost 17 months after his transfer. As 2006–07 progressed, Wright-Phillips picked up form and scored his first league goal against West Ham United on 18 April, following it up with his second in the same match. Subsequently, he started in several matches towards the end of the season including the 2007 FA Cup Final which Chelsea won.

He was selected to play in the 2008 League Cup Final, which Chelsea lost to Tottenham Hotspur.

=== Return to Manchester City ===
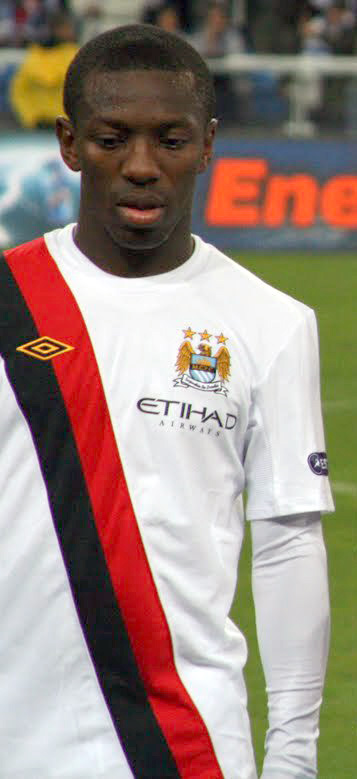
Wright-Phillips lining up for Manchester City in 2010

On 28 August 2008, he re-joined former club Manchester City on a four-year contract for an undisclosed fee, believed to be in the region of £8.5 million. On his second debut, Wright-Phillips scored two goals against Sunderland in the 3–0 away win in the Premier League. His third goal for City came in a 6–0 victory over Portsmouth on 21 September 2008. On 29 October, Wright-Phillips swore at former Middlesbrough manager Gareth Southgate during Manchester City's 2–0 defeat to his club, after Southgate complained about Wright-Phillips appearing to go down too easily after a challenge.

The 2009–10 season started very well for Wright-Phillips, setting up Emmanuel Adebayor's first goal for Man City in the third minute of a 2–0 win against Blackburn Rovers. He followed that up with a goal in a League Cup tie with Crystal Palace. Three weeks later against Arsenal, he set up a goal for Adebayor before scoring one for himself. He went on to score in successive home matches against Burnley and Hull City where he delivered an assist for Carlos Tevez's debut Man City goal. During his next game against Arsenal he scored in a 3–0 League Cup win which saw City progress to the tournament's semi finals.

The 2010–11 season saw City win the 2010–11 FA Cup, and despite being left out of the squad for the final, he did contribute some appearances earlier in the cup run, including coming on as a substitute against Manchester United in the semi-final.

=== Queens Park Rangers ===
On 31 August 2011, the final day of the transfer window, Wright-Phillips signed for Queens Park Rangers (QPR) on a three-year contract for an undisclosed fee. He made his full debut for QPR against Newcastle United on 12 September 2011, making the starting line-up and winning man of the match by supporters. He failed to score a goal for almost a year before scoring his first the following season for QPR against Walsall in the League Cup on 28 August 2012. His only goal for QPR in the Premier League came during the derby against former club Chelsea on 2 January 2013, which ended 1–0. After featuring even more sporadically during 2014–15, QPR announced that Wright-Phillips would be released from his contract in a batch of players that included fellow former England internationals Rio Ferdinand and Joey Barton.

=== New York Red Bulls ===
In June 2015, Wright-Phillips began training with Major League Soccer club the New York Red Bulls to regain fitness following his departure from QPR. Impressing head coach Jesse Marsch, he suggested he would sign for the club when his contract officially expired on 30 June.

On 27 July, he completed a move to join his brother, Bradley Wright-Phillips, at the New York Red Bulls. He made his debut on 1 August, coming off the bench to win a penalty and assist his brother in a 3–1 victory at the Philadelphia Union. Wright-Phillips was named in the MLS Team of the Week following the performance.

Wright-Phillips was released by the Red Bulls at the end of the 2015 Major League Soccer season, but was later re-signed on 25 January 2016.

=== Phoenix Rising FC ===
On 23 February 2017, Wright-Phillips signed for United Soccer League club Phoenix Rising FC. He made his debut on 26 March 2017, in a 1–0 defeat to Toronto FC II.

Wright-Phillips announced his retirement from playing on 24 August 2019 at the age of 37.

== International career ==
Wright-Phillips made his England debut as a substitute for Nicky Butt against Ukraine on 18 August 2004. He scored the last of England's goals in a 3–0 win, described by BBC Sport as "crowning a solo run with a stunning finish." On 17 November 2004, he became one of the main targets of racist chants from sections of the Spanish crowd at an international friendly between England and Spain in Madrid. He was a regular member of England's squad during qualification for the 2006 FIFA World Cup and made his first competitive start in a 1–0 away win over Wales. After a decline in form, however, especially a poor performance away to Northern Ireland, and a lack of matches following his move to Chelsea, he missed out on a place in the squad for the World Cup finals.

In a training session in August 2006, Wright-Phillips caused an ankle injury for Dean Ashton, which resulted in the West Ham United forward missing a full season and retiring in 2009 due to recurrences. Ashton considered suing Wright-Phillips, and the Football Association sought to prevent this and compensate Ashton through insurance claims. Ashton, who was told by his surgeon that not retiring would lose him the ability to walk, reached an undisclosed out-of-court settlement with the FA in 2011.

After a good start to the 2007–08 season, Wright-Phillips received an England recall to play against Germany in a friendly match at the new Wembley Stadium. Wright-Phillips was brought on as a substitute in the second half during the match in which England lost 2–1 to Germany and he was named the England sponsor's man of the match after an impressive performance.

On 8 September 2007, Wright-Phillips was selected to start against Israel in a UEFA Euro 2008 qualifier he scored the first goal in the 3–0 victory and won the England sponsor's man of the match award with his performance. He was then selected to start for England against Estonia and scored his third goal for England and the opener in a third consecutive 3–0 win at Wembley. He was selected in England's critical Euro 2008 qualifying match against Croatia, substituted at half time in favour of David Beckham with England trailing 2–0, with England eventually losing 3–2 and therefore missing out on Euro 2008.

On 14 October 2009, with England having already qualified for the 2010 World Cup, Wright-Phillips was selected in the starting XI against Belarus at Wembley Stadium." Unusually, he was joined in the team (which was missing Wayne Rooney through injury) by Tottenham Hotspur's Aaron Lennon, meaning England played with two recognised wingers. Mid-way through the second half, Wright-Phillips drove in a shot from the edge of the penalty area which beat the dive of the Belarus goalkeeper. He appeared as a second-half substitute against Egypt on 3 March 2010, scoring England's second goal and assisting Peter Crouch for the third as they came from behind to win 3–1.

On 1 June 2010, Wright-Phillips was selected for England's final 23-man squad that was to play in the 2010 FIFA World Cup in South Africa. He appeared as a substitute in England's opening two group matches against United States and Algeria.

== Media appearances ==
Since retiring from football, Wright-Phillips has provided commentary on platforms including BBC Sport, ITV Sport and Talksport and Sky Sports. In September 2026, he became a contestant on the twenty-fourth series of Strictly Come Dancing.

== Personal life ==
Wright-Phillips has a son, D'Margio Wright-Phillips, who plays for Belgian club Beerschot. He is also capped for England U16s.

== Career statistics ==
=== Club ===
Appearances and goals by club, season and competition
Club	Season	League			National cup (Note: Includes FA Cup, U.S. Open Cup)		League cup (Note: Includes Football League Cup)		Continental		Other		Total	
Club	Season	Division	Apps	Goals	Apps	Goals	Apps	Goals	Apps	Goals	Apps	Goals	Apps	Goals
Manchester City	1999–2000	First Division	4	0	0	0	1	0	—		—		5	0
Manchester City	2000–01	Premier League	15	0	0	0	4	0	—		—		19	0
Manchester City	2001–02	First Division	35	8	3	0	2	0	—		—		40	8
Manchester City	2002–03	Premier League	31	1	1	0	2	0	—		—		34	1
Manchester City	2003–04	Premier League	34	7	4	1	2	2	6 (Note: Appearances in UEFA Cup)	1	—		46	11
Manchester City	2004–05	Premier League	34	10	1	0	2	1	—		—		37	11
Manchester City	Total		153	26	9	1	13	3	6	1	—		181	31
Chelsea	2005–06	Premier League	27	0	4	0	1	0	6 (Note: Appearances in UEFA Champions League)	0	1 (Note: Appearance in FA Community Shield)	0	39	0
Chelsea	2006–07	Premier League	27	2	7	3	3	0	6	1	1	0	44	6
Chelsea	2007–08	Premier League	27	2	3	1	5	1	5	0	1	0	41	4
Chelsea	2008–09	Premier League	1	0	—		—		—		—		1	0
Chelsea	Total		82	4	14	4	9	1	17	1	3	0	125	10
Manchester City	2008–09	Premier League	27	5	1	0	0	0	9	3	—		37	8
Manchester City	2009–10	Premier League	30	4	2	1	6	2	—		—		38	7
Manchester City	2010–11	Premier League	7	0	3	0	0	0	9 (Note: Appearances in UEFA Europa League)	1	—		19	1
Manchester City	2011–12	Premier League	0	0	—		—		—		0	0	0	0
Manchester City	Total		64	9	6	1	6	2	18	4	0	0	94	16
Queens Park Rangers	2011–12	Premier League	32	0	2	0	—		—		—		34	0
Queens Park Rangers	2012–13	Premier League	20	1	1	0	1	1	—		—		22	2
Queens Park Rangers	2013–14	Championship	11	0	0	0	2	0	—		0	0	13	0
Queens Park Rangers	2014–15	Premier League	4	0	0	0	1	0	—		—		5	0
Queens Park Rangers	Total		67	1	3	0	4	1	—		0	0	74	2
New York Red Bulls	2015	Major League Soccer	14	1	—		—		—		—		14	1
New York Red Bulls	2016	Major League Soccer	7	0	1	0	—		3 (Note: Appearances in CONCACAF Champions League)	0	—		11	0
New York Red Bulls	Total		21	1	1	0	—		3	0	—		25	1
New York Red Bulls II	2016	United Soccer League	1	0	—		—		—		—		1	0
Phoenix Rising FC	2017	United Soccer League	26	3	1	0	—		—		—		27	3
Career total			413	44	34	6	32	7	44	6	3	0	527	63

=== International ===
Appearances and goals by national team and year
National team	Year	Apps	Goals
England	2004	3	1
England	2005	4	0
England	2006	4	0
England	2007	7	2
England	2008	4	1
England	2009	7	1
England	2010	7	1
Total		36	6

Scores and results list England's goal tally first, score column indicates score after each Wright-Phillips goal

List of international goals scored by Shaun Wright-Phillips
No.	Date	Venue	Cap	Opponent	Score	Result	Competition	Ref.
1	18 August 2004	St James' Park, Newcastle upon Tyne, England	1	Ukraine	3–0	3–0	Friendly	
2	8 September 2007	Wembley Stadium, London, England	14	Israel	1–0	3–0	UEFA Euro 2008 qualifying	
3	13 October 2007	Wembley Stadium, London, England	16	Estonia	1–0	3–0	UEFA Euro 2008 qualifying	
4	6 February 2008	Wembley Stadium, London, England	19	Switzerland	2–1	2–1	Friendly	
5	14 October 2009	Wembley Stadium, London, England	28	Belarus	2–0	3–0	2010 FIFA World Cup qualification	
6	3 March 2010	Wembley Stadium, London, England	30	Egypt	2–1	3–1	Friendly	

== Honours ==
Manchester City

- Football League First Division: 2001–02
- FA Cup: 2010–11

Chelsea

- Premier League: 2005–06
- FA Cup: 2006–07
- FA Community Shield: 2005
- Football League Cup runner-up: 2007–08

Individual

- Manchester City Young Player of the Year: 1999–2000, 2000–01, 2001–02, 2002–03
- Manchester City Player of the Year: 2003–04
- PFA Team of the Year: 2004–05 Premier League
