= 2005 FA Community Shield =

- The match programme cover
Arsenal	Chelsea
1	2
- Date: 7 August 2005
- Venue: Millennium Stadium, Cardiff, Wales
- Man of the Match: Didier Drogba (Chelsea)
- Referee: Howard Webb (Sheffield & Hallamshire)
- Attendance: 58,014
- Weather: Partly cloudy 19 °C (66 °F)

The 2005 FA Community Shield (also known as The FA Community Shield in partnership with McDonald's for sponsorship reasons) was the 83rd staging of the FA Community Shield, an annual football match contested by the reigning champions of the Premier League and the holders of the FA Cup. It was held at the Millennium Stadium in Cardiff on 7 August 2005. The game was played between Chelsea, champions of the 2004–05 Premier League and Arsenal, who beat Manchester United on penalties to win the 2005 FA Cup Final. Chelsea won the match 2–1 in front of a crowd of 58,014.

This was Chelsea's fifth Community Shield appearance to Arsenal's 19th. Relations between the two clubs were hostile before the match, given Chelsea's illicit attempts to sign Arsenal defender Ashley Cole. In the game Chelsea took the lead when striker Didier Drogba scored in the eighth minute. He scored again in the second half, before Cesc Fàbregas replied for Arsenal with a goal in the 64th minute. José Mourinho praised Chelsea in his post-match interview and felt the team looked comfortable in defence. Opposing manager Arsène Wenger admitted Drogba had presented problems for Arsenal and likened his opponents to a long ball team, who on the day played "very direct".

== Background and pre-match ==
Founded in 1908 as a successor to the Sheriff of London Charity Shield, the FA Community Shield began as a contest between the respective champions of the Football League and Southern League, although in 1913, it was played between an Amateurs XI and a Professionals XI. In 1921, it was played by the league champions of the top division and FA Cup winners for the first time. (Note: The Premier League replaced the Football League First Division at the top of the English football pyramid after its inception in 1992.) Cardiff's Millennium Stadium was hosting the Shield for the fifth time; it took over as the venue for the event while Wembley Stadium underwent a six-year renovation between 2001 and 2006.

Chelsea qualified for the 2005 FA Community Shield as winners of the 2004–05 FA Premier League. It was their first league title in 50 years, remembered for the records broken such as the most wins, fewest goals conceded in a league season and most points accumulated. The other Community Shield place went to Arsenal, who beat Manchester United on penalties to win the final of the 2004–05 FA Cup. Arsenal was making its 19th Community Shield appearance and held the Shield after beating Manchester United 3–1 a year previously. By contrast this was Chelsea's fifth appearance, their first since 2000. It was also the first meeting between both sides in the Shield.

Chelsea manager José Mourinho described relations between the two clubs as "non-existent", given his club's approach to sign (tapping up) Arsenal defender Ashley Cole. The player had met Mourinho and chief executive Peter Kenyon at a London hotel in January 2005, without Arsenal's consent. Chelsea, Mourinho and Cole were all later found guilty by an independent commission and fined accordingly; the club was charged the most amount – £300,000.

The ownership of Chelsea by Russian billionaire Roman Abramovich also caused friction between both clubs. Arsenal manager Arsène Wenger said in May 2005: "They are a financially doped club. They have enhancement of performances through financial resources which are unlimited. For me, it's a kind of doping because it's not in any way linked to their resources. It puts pressure on the market that is not very healthy. They can go to Steven Gerrard or Rio Ferdinand and 'say how much do you earn, we'll give you twice as much.'" Wenger admitted this put Arsenal at a disadvantage in the transfer market; in the case of Shaun Wright-Phillips, a long-term target, Chelsea's interest meant Arsenal needed to wait before making a bid. The player eventually joined Chelsea from Manchester City for £21 million.

== Match ==
=== Team selection ===
Chelsea fielded a full-strength team, which lined up in a 4–3–3 formation; an attacking three of Didier Drogba, Damien Duff and Arjen Robben. Asier Del Horno was named as left back, which meant William Gallas moved to central defence. Wright-Phillips began the match on the substitute bench. Arsenal's line up by contrast was relatively inexperienced in midfield – Gilberto Silva was on the bench and Mathieu Flamini partnered Cesc Fàbregas in the centre. Up front Dennis Bergkamp started alongside striker Thierry Henry. The team played in a 4–4–2 formation.

=== Summary ===
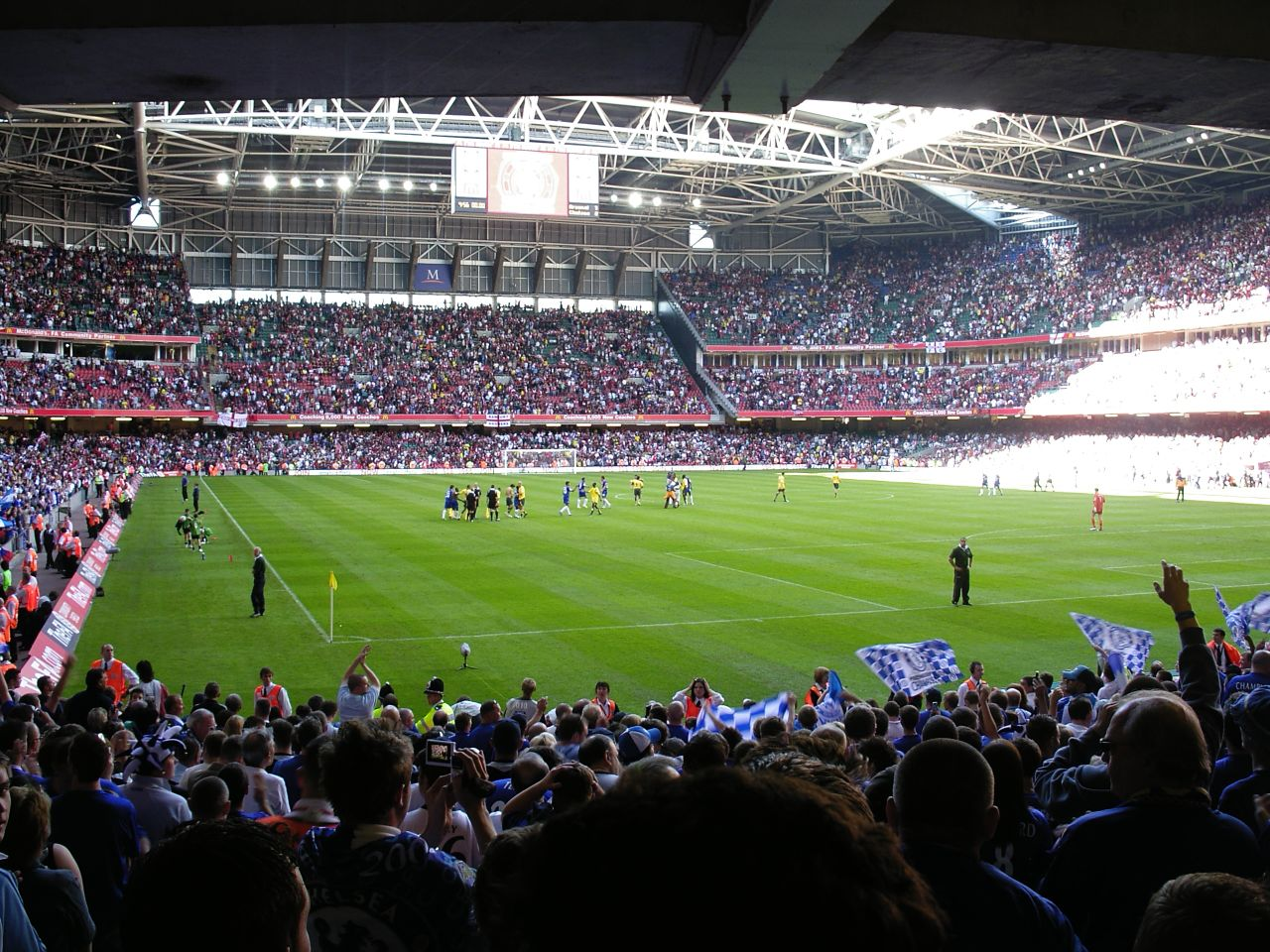
Action during the match

The stadium observed a period of silence in memory of the victims of the July bombings in London, and a mark of respect to Arsenal fan Anthony Walker, killed on Merseyside the previous week. Arsenal in their away strip of yellow kicked off the match; they won a corner after four minutes, but their threat was averted by Chelsea. In the eighth minute Del Horno hit a long pass to the edge of Arsenal's right area. Drogba controlled the ball with his chest and went beyond his marker Philippe Senderos. He shot the ball past goalkeeper Jens Lehmann in the Arsenal goal to give Chelsea a 1–0 lead. Arsenal began to dominate proceedings, but struggled to make use of their advantage. A slip by Senderos in the 20th minute invited Robben to make a run down the right side of the pitch, but the chance for Chelsea was brief as Senderos won the ball back. Four minutes later Fàbregas and Claude Makélélé were each shown a yellow card for clashing with one another. Arsenal in the 36th minute fashioned their best chance of the game through Kolo Touré, whose shot forced goalkeeper Petr Čech to save acrobatically. Six minutes before the interval Drogba was ruled offside, but continued to run in the direction of Arsenal's goal. He went down on a challenge from Lauren and proceeded to roll around Arsenal's penalty area once Lehmann got involved – the "farce" was brought to a close after words from the referee.

Arsenal made a host of changes before the match restarted – Gilberto, Robin van Persie and Alexander Hleb were substituted on for Bergkamp, Robert Pires and Flamini. Robben made a run down the right side of the pitch, but failed to get past Senderos in what was the first notable action of the second half. Moments after, Freddie Ljungberg's attempt on goal was cleared by the Chelsea defence following good play by Van Persie. In the 57th minute Chelsea increased their lead. A long pass found Drogba, who once more held off Senderos in pursuit of the ball. He was forced wide by Lehmann, but on the turn shot the ball through the net to score his second goal of the game. Drogba was then replaced by Hernán Crespo, and Tiago came on for Eiður Guðjohnsen. Arsenal scored in the 64th minute; Ljungberg crossed the ball from the left and Fàbregas evaded the Chelsea defence to slot it past Čech in the goal. Both clubs made mass substitutions in the final third of the game, notably Wright-Phillips coming on for his Chelsea debut in place of Robben. Arsenal continued to push for an equaliser the longer the match went on, which meant they were culpable to Chelsea countering. A free-kick by Van Persie was saved by Čech and it was not until the 86th minute that Henry fashioned his first chance of the half – it too was dealt with by Čech. Chelsea continued to withstand Arsenal's pressure in injury time and came close to scoring a third goal, but for Touré's intervention.

=== Details ===
7 August 2005
15:00 BST

Arsenal	1–2	Chelsea
Fàbregas 64'	Report	Drogba 8', 58'

Millennium Stadium, Cardiff
Attendance: 58,014
Referee: Howard Webb (South Yorkshire)

Arsenal	Chelsea

GK	1	(Germany) Jens Lehmann
RB	12	(Cameroon) Lauren		(substituted off) 78'
CB	28	(Ivory Coast) Kolo Touré
CB	20	(Switzerland) Philippe Senderos		(substituted off) 72'
LB	3	(England) Ashley Cole
RM	8	(Sweden) Freddie Ljungberg		(substituted off) 72'
CM	15	(Spain) Cesc Fàbregas	(yellow card) 24'
CM	16	(France) Mathieu Flamini		(substituted off) 46'
LM	7	(France) Robert Pires		(substituted off) 46'
CF	10	(Netherlands) Dennis Bergkamp		(substituted off) 46'
CF	14	(France) Thierry Henry (c)
Substitutes:
GK	39	(England) Mark Howard
DF	18	(France) Pascal Cygan		(substituted on) 72'
DF	31	(England) Justin Hoyte		(substituted on) 78'
MF	13	(Belarus) Alexander Hleb		(substituted on) 46'
MF	19	(Brazil) Gilberto Silva		(substituted on) 46'
FW	9	(Spain) José Antonio Reyes		(substituted on) 72'
FW	11	(Netherlands) Robin van Persie		(substituted on) 46'
Manager:
(France) Arsène Wenger

GK	1	(Czech Republic) Petr Čech
RB	20	(Portugal) Paulo Ferreira
CB	13	(France) William Gallas
CB	26	(England) John Terry (c)
LB	3	(Spain) Asier del Horno
DM	4	(France) Claude Makélélé	(yellow card) 24'
CM	22	(Iceland) Eiður Guðjohnsen		(substituted off) 59'
CM	8	(England) Frank Lampard	(yellow card) 82'	(substituted off) 90'
RW	16	(Netherlands) Arjen Robben		(substituted off) 69'
LW	11	(Republic of Ireland) Damien Duff		(substituted off) 74'
CF	15	(Ivory Coast) Didier Drogba		(substituted off) 59'
Substitutes:
GK	23	(Italy) Carlo Cudicini
DF	6	(Portugal) Ricardo Carvalho
MF	10	(England) Joe Cole		(substituted on) 74'
MF	14	(Cameroon) Geremi		(substituted on) 90'
MF	24	(England) Shaun Wright-Phillips		(substituted on) 69'
MF	30	(Portugal) Tiago		(substituted on) 59'
FW	9	(Argentina) Hernán Crespo		(substituted on) 59'
Manager:
(Portugal) José Mourinho

Match officials

- Assistant referees:
  - Trevor Massey (Cheshire)
  - Peter Kirkup (Northamptonshire)
- Fourth official: Barry Knight (Kent)

Man of the match

- (Ivory Coast) Didier Drogba (Chelsea)

Match rules

- 90 minutes
- Penalty shoot-out if scores level after 90 minutes
- Seven named substitutes, of which up to six may be used

=== Statistics ===
Statistic	Arsenal	Chelsea
Goals scored	1	2
Shots on target	7	3
Shots off target	5	5
Corner kicks	4	5
Fouls committed	7	17
Offsides	2	10
Yellow cards	1	2
Red cards	0	0
Passing success	84%	72.6%
Possession	58.8%	41.2%

== Post-match and aftermath ==
"Our strength is that we can mix it up. We can play football, or we can ask for a longer ball. Playing a long-ball game does not mean you show a lack of quality. We have different qualities – that is one of our strengths."

— Frank Lampard on Chelsea's playing style.

Mourinho believed his team deserved to win and said after scoring the first goal, "we looked comfortable and solid in the defence and good on the counter-attack." He did not believe the result would have any consequences for either team, but said "...it is better to win than to lose and we can go home happy and with a smile on our faces." John Terry described the victory as a "perfect start", and added it gave Chelsea a psychological edge over Arsenal. Drogba felt the result was good for the team's confidence, though confessed Chelsea did not play well – particularly in midfield.

Two weeks after the Community Shield match, both teams played each other in the league at Chelsea's home ground, Stamford Bridge. Drogba scored the only goal of the game, which marked Arsenal's first league defeat against their opponents in ten years. Chelsea also beat Arsenal away from home on their last visit to Highbury, later in December, and went on to retain the Premier League.

At odds with their indifferent league form which led them to a narrowly earned 4th place finish (outside of the top two for the first time under coach Arsene Wenger), Arsenal's performances in the UEFA Champions League were appreciable. They became the first London team to participate in a European Cup final, though lost 2–1 to Barcelona at the Stade de France in Saint-Denis.

== See also ==
- 2005–06 FA Premier League
- 2005–06 FA Cup
- Arsenal F.C.–Chelsea F.C. rivalry
