= Baltemar Brito =

Brazilian footballer and coach (born 1952)

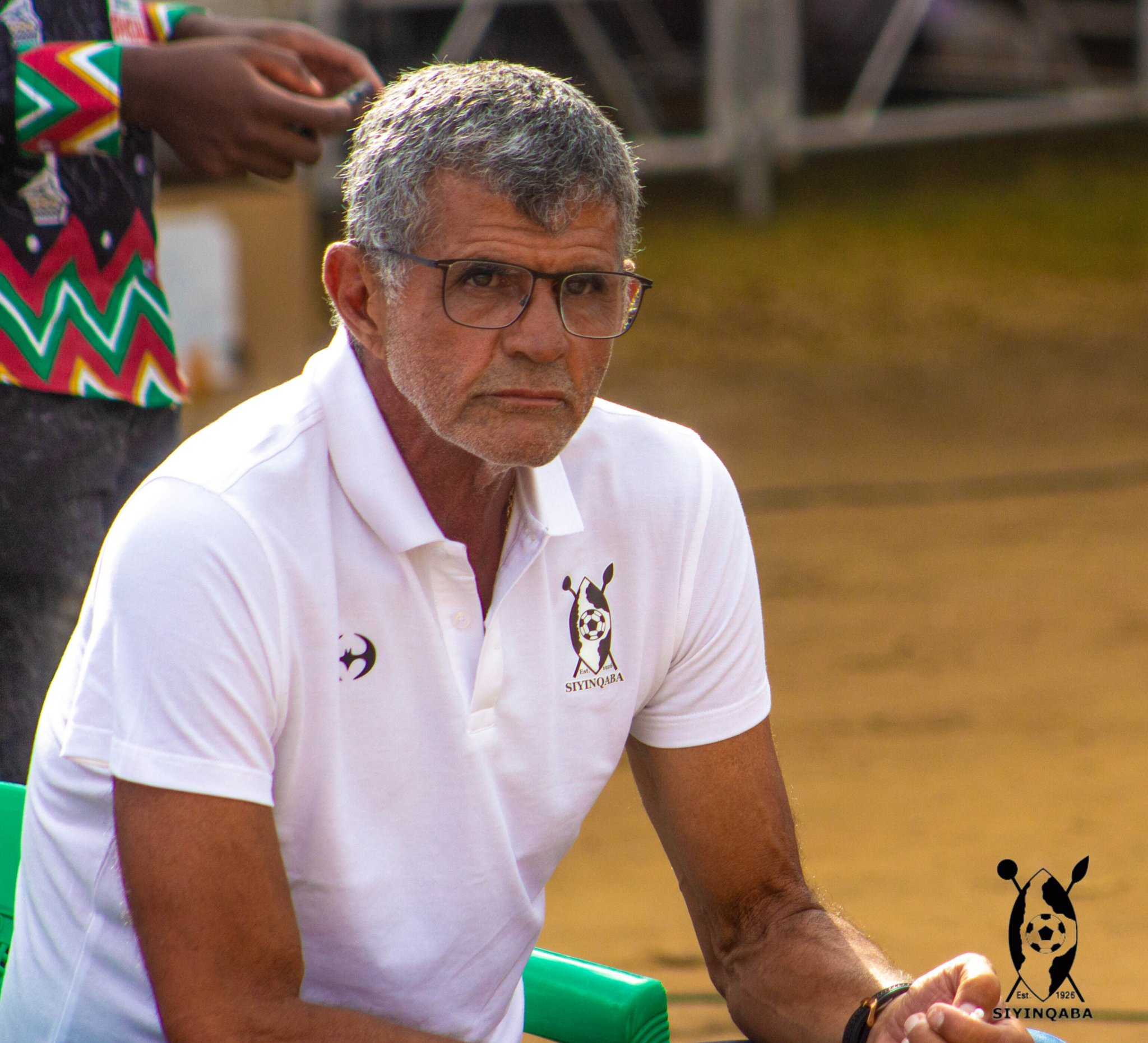
- Brito in 2023

Personal information
- Full name: Baltemar José de Oliveira Brito
- Date of birth: 9 January 1952 (age 74)
- Place of birth: Recife, Brazil
- Position: Centre back

Senior career*
Years	Team	Apps	(Gls)
1972	Sport		
1973–1974	Santa Cruz		
1974–1975	Vitória Guimarães	0	(0)
1975–1977	Paços Ferreira		
1977–1979	Feirense	29	(0)
1979–1980	Paços Ferreira	30	(0)
1980–1982	Rio Ave	57	(2)
1982–1983	Vitória Setúbal	30	(1)
1983–1985	Rio Ave	65	(4)
1985–1988	Varzim	45	(0)

Managerial career
- 1988: Varzim
- 1989–1994: Macedo Cavaleiros
- 1998–1999: Macedo Cavaleiros
- 1999–2000: Barrosas
- 2001: União Leiria (assistant)
- 2002–2004: Porto (assistant)
- 2004–2007: Chelsea (assistant)
- 2010: Belenenses
- 2010–2011: Al-Ittihad
- 2011: Al Dhafra
- 2012–2013: Grêmio
- 2013–2014: Al-Ittihad Tripoli
- 2015–2016: Espérance (assistant)
- 2016–2017: AEK Athens (assistant)
- 2018: Union Titus Pétange
- 2022–2023: Highlanders
- 2023–2024: Zimbabwe (interim)
- 2023–2024: Zimbabwe U-23 (interim)
- 2023–2024: Zimbabwe U-20 (interim)
- * Club domestic league appearances and goals

Baltemar José de Oliveira Brito (born 9 January 1952) is a Brazilian professional football coach and a former player who played as a central defender, who formerly served as the interim head coach of the Zimbabwe national football team.

== Playing career ==
Born in Recife, Pernambuco, Brito spent the vast majority of his professional career in Portugal, representing Vitória Guimarães (no league games played), Paços Ferreira (two spells), Feirense, Rio Ave (two stints), Vitória de Setúbal and Varzim.

Over the course of eight seasons, he amassed Primeira Liga totals of 197 games and seven goals in representation of all the clubs except Paços, with which he competed solely in the second division. He retired at the end of 1987–88 at the age of 36, after suffering top flight relegation with Varzim.

== Coaching career ==
Brito was in charge of Varzim for two games in his last season as a player, managing two draws. Subsequently, he had two spells as head coach with lowly CA Macedo de Cavaleiros.

In the 2001–02 campaign, at União Leiria, Brito started a link with José Mourinho that would last eight years. The assistant was part of a quartet that also included fitness coach Rui Faria, goalkeeping coach Silvino Louro and chief scout André Villas-Boas that followed the young manager from Porto to Chelsea.

Brito also specialised in audio-visual work to prepare the team for matches. As Mourinho left the Premier League side early into 2007–08, so did his entire staff. On 5 June 2010, he was appointed head coach at Belenenses in the Portuguese second level, but was sacked the following month before the season had even started.

On 18 May 2013, after a series of poor results, Brito was fired by Grêmio.

On 8 January 2018, Brito became head coach at Union Titus Pétange, a club of the first Luxembourgish league. He left the club in December 2018.

On 3 June 2022, Highlanders announced the appointment of Britto as their senior team' coach.
