= 2006–07 Wycombe Wanderers F.C. season =

Wycombe Wanderers
2006–07 season
- Chairman: Ivor Beeks
- Head coach: Paul Lambert
- Stadium: Adams Park
- League Two: 12th
- FA Cup: Second round
- League Cup: Semi-finals
- Football League Trophy: Second round
- Top goalscorer: League: Jermaine Easter (17); All: Jermaine Easter (24)
- Highest home attendance: 8,878 (vs Swindon Town, 26 December 2006, League Two)
- Lowest home attendance: 3,038 (vs Doncaster Rovers, 24 October 2006, League Cup)
- Average home league attendance: 4,999
- Biggest win: 4–0 (vs Bury (A), 17 February 2007, League Two)
- Biggest defeat: 0–4 (vs Chelsea (A), 23 January 2007, League Cup)

During the 2006–07 English football season, Wycombe Wanderers competed in Football League Two.

== Season summary ==
Wycombe finished solidly in midtable, but their greatest success during the season came in the League Cup. Shock wins against the likes of Fulham and Charlton saw Wycombe reach the semi-finals, where they were drawn against Chelsea. A home draw at Adams Park gave Wycombe fans optimism, but Wycombe were easily beaten 4–0 at Stamford Bridge in the return leg.

== Squad ==
Squad at end of season

Note: Flags indicate national team as defined under FIFA eligibility rules; some limited exceptions apply. Players may hold more than one non-FIFA nationality.

No.	Pos.	Nation	Player
1	GK	AUS	Frank Talia
2	DF	ENG	Lewis Christon
3	MF	ENG	Chris Palmer
4	DF	ENG	Russell Martin (Note: Martin was born in Brighton, England, but also qualified to represent Scotland internationally through his father and would make his international debut for Scotland in May 2011.)
5	DF	GHA	Will Antwi (Note: Antwi was born in Epsom, England, but also qualified to represent Ghana internationally and made his international debut for Ghana in 2003.)
6	DF	ENG	Michael Williamson
8	MF	ENG	Stefan Oakes
9	FW	WAL	Jermaine Easter
10	MF	ENG	Matt Bloomfield
12	FW	NGR	Fola Onibuje
15	MF	NIR	Tommy Doherty (Note: Doherty was born in Bristol, England, but also qualified to represent Northern Ireland internationally through his grandfather and made his international debut for Northern Ireland in June 2003.) (on loan from Queens Park Rangers)
16	FW	ENG	Tommy Mooney
17	FW	ENG	Scott McGleish
18	MF	ENG	Scott Golbourne (Note: Golbourne wore #19 in a separate loan spell during the season.) (on loan from Reading)

No.	Pos.	Nation	Player
19	MF	SCO	Anthony McParland
20	MF	ENG	Steven Gregory
21	FW	ENG	Matthew Barnes-Homer
22	MF	ARG	Sergio Torres
23	FW	ENG	James Faulkner
24	DF	ENG	Tom Cadmore
25	DF	ENG	Sam Stockley
26	DF	ENG	Leon Crooks
28	MF	SCO	Ikechi Anya
30	MF	ENG	Anthony Grant (on loan from Chelsea)
31	GK	POR	Ricardo Batista (on loan from Fulham)
32	GK	ENG	Jamie Young (Note: Young was born in Brisbane, Australia, but also qualifies to represent England internationally and has represented them at U-18, U-19 and U-20 level.)
33	GK	ENG	Dean Thornton

=== Left club during season ===
Note: Flags indicate national team as defined under FIFA eligibility rules; some limited exceptions apply. Players may hold more than one non-FIFA nationality.

No.	Pos.	Nation	Player
7	MF	ENG	Kevin Betsy (Note: Betsy was born in Woking, England, and played for the England C team, but also qualified to represent Seychelles internationally and would make his international debut for Seychelles in June 2011.) (to Bristol City)
7	FW	ENG	Lionel Ainsworth (on loan from Derby County)
11	FW	ENG	Ian Stonebridge (retired)
17	FW	ENG	Charlie Griffin (to Newport County)
18	FW	ESP	Jonny Dixon (to Aldershot Town)

No.	Pos.	Nation	Player
21	GK	ENG	Steve Williams (to Lewes)
27	DF	ENG	Adrian Pettigrew (on loan from Chelsea)
29	DF	FRA	Vincent Fernandez (on loan from Nottingham Forest)
29	DF	IRL	Stephen O'Halloran (on loan from Aston Villa)

== Competitions ==
=== Overall record ===
Competition	First match	Last match	Starting round	Final position	Record							
Competition	First match	Last match	Starting round	Final position	Pld	W	D	L	GF	GA	GD	Win %
League Two	5 August 2006	5 May 2007	Matchday 1	12th	46	16	14	16	52	47	+5	34.78
FA Cup	11 November 2006	1 December 2006	Second round	Second round	2	1	0	1	3	3	+0	50.00
League Cup	22 August 2006	23 January 2007	First round	Semi-finals	7	5	1	1	10	10	+0	71.43
Football League Trophy	17 October 2006	31 October 2006	First round	Second round	2	1	0	1	1	2	−1	50.00
Total					57	23	15	19	66	62	+4	40.35

Source: Competitions

=== League Two ===
==== League table ====
Pos	Team	Pld	W	D	L	GF	GA	GD	Pts
10	Peterborough United	46	18	11	17	70	61	+9	65
11	Darlington	46	17	14	15	52	56	−4	65
12	Wycombe Wanderers	46	16	14	16	52	47	+5	62
13	Notts County	46	16	14	16	55	53	+2	62
14	Barnet	46	16	11	19	55	70	−15	59

Rules for classification: In the Football League goals scored (GF) takes precedence over goal difference (GD).

==== Results summary ====
Overall								Home						Away					
Pld	W	D	L	GF	GA	GD	Pts	W	D	L	GF	GA	GD	W	D	L	GF	GA	GD
46	16	14	16	52	47	+5	62	8	11	4	23	14	+9	8	3	12	29	33	−4

==== Results by matchday ====
Game Week	1	2	3	4	5	6	7	8	9	10	11	12	13	14	15	16	17	18	19	20	21	22	23	24	25	26	27	28	29	30	31	32	33	34	35	36	37	38	39	40	41	42	43	44	45	46
Ground	H	A	A	H	A	H	H	A	A	H	H	A	H	A	H	A	A	H	A	H	H	A	H	A	A	H	H	A	H	A	A	H	A	H	A	H	A	H	H	A	H	A	H	A	H	A
Result	D	W	L	W	W	W	W	W	W	L	D	L	W	L	W	W	D	D	L	W	D	L	W	L	L	D	D	W	D	L	W	D	W	L	L	W	L	D	D	D	D	D	L	L	L	L
Position	12	15	10	14	9	6	5	3	3	1	3	3	3	2	4	4	3	3	4	4	4	5	5	5	6	6	6	6	6	6	7	7	7	7	7	7	7	7	7	8	7	7	9	9	11	12

Source: Sky Sports
A = Away; H = Home; W = Win; D = Draw; L = Loss; P = Postponed
Notes: Positions show the situation at the end of the corresponding Game Weeks (GW); not the position at the conclusion of matches or game days

=== FA Cup ===
Wycombe Wanderers were drawn at home to Oxford United in the first round. In the second round, Wycombe Wanderers were drawn away to Stockport County.

11 November 2006 First round	Wycombe Wanderers	2–1	Oxford United	Wycombe
15:00 GMT	Antwi (yellow card) 36' (goal) 58'; Grant (yellow card) 55'; Oakes 89'		Brevett (yellow card) 11'; Johnson 85'	Stadium: Adams Park; Attendance: 6,279; Referee: Scott Matheison

12 January 2007 Second round	Stockport County	2–1	Wycombe Wanderers	Stockport
19:45 GMT	Proudlock 43', 75' (yellow card) 73'		Easter 34'; Mooney (yellow card) 41'; Martin (yellow card) 41'; Williamson (yellow card) 49'; Antwi (yellow card) 81'	Stadium: Edgeley Park; Attendance: 3,821; Referee: Gary John Sutton

=== League Cup ===
Wycombe Wanderers entered the competition in the first round and were drawn away to Swansea City. In the second round they were again drawn away, against Fulham. In the third round they were drawn at home to Doncaster Rovers. In the round of 16 they were drawn away to Notts County and in quarter-finals they were again drawn away to Charlton. They were drawn against Chelsea in the semi-finals.

22 August 2006 First round	Swansea City	2–3 (a.e.t.)	Wycombe Wanderers	Swansea
19:45 BST	Williamson 72' (o.g.); Pratley 81' (yellow card); Amankwaah (yellow card)		Easter 50'; Oakes 64' (yellow card); Williamson 113'; Palmer (yellow card); Dixon (yellow card)	Stadium: Liberty Stadium; Attendance: 5,982; Referee: Richard Beeby

20 September 2006 Second round	Fulham	1–2	Wycombe Wanderers	Fulham
19:45 BST	Helguson 47'; Runström (yellow card); Timlin (yellow card)		Easter 8'; Mooney 41'; Grant (yellow card); Martin (yellow card)	Stadium: Craven Cottage; Attendance: 6,620; Referee: Andy Hall

24 October 2006 Third round	Wycombe Wanderers	2–2 (a.e.t.) (3–2 p)	Doncaster Rovers	Wycombe
19:45 GMT	Oakes 71' (red card); Easter 116'; Bloomfield (yellow card) 118'		Forte 65'; Lee 97'; Smith (yellow card) 120'	Stadium: Adams Park; Attendance: 3,308; Referee: Rob Styles
	Penalties
	Easter (penalty missed); Betsy (penalty scored); Martin (penalty scored); Stonebridge (penalty scored)		(penalty scored) Green; (penalty missed) Coppinger; (penalty scored) Heffernan; (penalty missed) McDaid; (penalty missed) Stock

7 November 2006 Round of 16	Notts County	0–1	Wycombe Wanderers	Nottingham
19:45 GMT	Lee (yellow card) 54'; Edwards (yellow card) 89'		Easter 49'	Stadium: Meadow Lane; Attendance: 7,395; Referee: Nigel Miller

19 December 2006 Quarter-final	Charlton	0–1	Wycombe Wanderers	Charlton
20:00 GMT	Hughes (yellow card) 23'		Easter 35' (yellow card) 69'; Grant (yellow card) 6'	Stadium: The Valley; Attendance: 18,940; Referee: Mark Clattenburg

10 January 2007 Semi-finals first leg	Wycombe Wanderers	1–1	Chelsea	Wycombe
20:00 GMT	Easter 77'; Mooney (yellow card) 57'; Williamson (yellow card) 90'		Bridge 36'	Stadium: Adams Park; Attendance: 9,771; Referee: Steve Bennett

23 January 2007 Semi-finals second leg	Chelsea	4–0 (4–1 agg.)	Wycombe Wanderers	Fulham
19:45 GMT	Shevchenko (22}43); Lampard 69', 90'; Cole (yellow card); Essien (yellow card)			Stadium: Stamford Bridge; Attendance: 41,591; Referee: Mike Dean

=== Football League Trophy ===
In the first round Wycombe Wanderers were at home to Swindon Town. In the second round they were again drawn at home to Bristol Rovers.

17 October 2006 First round	Wycombe Wanderers	1–0	Swindon Town	Wycombe
19:00 GMT	Stonebridge 13'; Doherty (yellow card) 48'; Stockley (yellow card) 88'		Whalley (yellow card) 43'; Ifil (yellow card) 43'	Stadium: Adams Park; Attendance: 1,583; Referee: Darren Deadman

31 October 2006 Second round	Wycombe Wanderers	0–2	Bristol Rovers	Wycombe
19:15 GMT	Easter (yellow card) 32'; Betsy (yellow card) 40'; Batista (yellow card) 85'		Jamal Easter 30'; Igoe 82'; Walker (yellow card) 85'	Stadium: Adams Park; Attendance: 1,314; Referee: Ray Lee
