= Christon =

Christon may refer to:

== Places ==
- Christon, Somerset, a village in Loxton, England
- Christon Bank, a village in Northumberland, England

== Surname ==
- Lewis Christon (born 1989), English professional footballer
- Phillip Christon (born 1961), American film director and screenwriter
- Semaj Christon (born 1992), American professional basketball player
- Shameka Christon (born 1982), American professional women's basketball player

== Given name ==
- Christon Gray (born 1986), American R&B singer and rapper
- Christon Tembo (1944-2009), Zambian politician and army commander
