= 2009–10 Milton Keynes Dons F.C. season =

Milton Keynes Dons
2009–10 season
- Chairman: Pete Winkelman
- Manager: Paul Ince
- Stadium: Stadium mk
- League One: 12th
- FA Cup: Third round
- League Cup: First round
- League Trophy: Area Final
- Top goalscorer: League: Jermaine Easter (19); All: Jermaine Easter (19)
- Highest home attendance: 16,713 (vs Leeds United); 26 September 2009, League One
- Lowest home attendance: 4,413 (vs Dagenham & Redbridge); 1 September 2009, League Trophy R1
- Average home league attendance: 10,289
- Biggest win: 0–5 (vs Hartlepool United); 16 January 2010, League One
- Biggest defeat: 5–0 (vs Carlisle United); 13 February 2010, League One
Home colours	Away colours	Third colours

The 2009–10 season was Milton Keynes Dons' sixth season in their existence as a professional association football club, and their second consecutive season competing in Football League One.

As well as competing in League One, the club also participated in the FA Cup, League Cup and League Trophy.

The season covers the period from 1 July 2009 to 30 June 2010.

== Season overview ==
It was manager Paul Ince's single season in charge of the club during his second spell as manager. He had replaced former manager, Roberto Di Matteo who had moved to take over the manager's role at West Bromwich Albion. Ince resigned in April 2010 blaming proposed budget cuts as a reason for his departure. Ince's assistant manager was Karl Robinson who would go on to replace him as manager in May 2010.

Top scorer for the season was Welsh striker, Jermaine Easter who was Ince's second singing for the club, in July 2009. Also signed by Ince in July 2009 was former Chelsea and Watford goalkeeper, Stuart Searle who was signed to serve as back-up goalkeeper to Willy Guéret. Milton Keynes Dons finished in 12th position in League One, 20 points outside of the play-off positions. A long injury list and a poor disciplinary record undermined their chances of success. Although in fifth place and in the play-off places on Boxing Day, 2009, following a 4–1 win against Stockport County, they lost their next game, away to Huddersfield Town, and did not regain a place in the play-off positions for the rest of the season. They fell away badly from the league leaders towards the end of the season, failing to win any of their last 11 games. A season total of 236,663 people watched the team play their 23 home League One games giving an average attendance of 10,290 per match, the 7th highest in the league.

MK Dons reached the Third Round of the FA Cup before being beaten 2–1 in Milton Keynes by Burnley. Managed by Owen Coyle the creativity of Chris Eagles and the thrust in attack of Steven Fletcher were prominent features of the game. A goal from Fletcher and a penalty by Graham Alexander won the match with a single goal from MK Dons' Dean Morgan in response.

They played only in the First Round of the League Cup before being eliminated 1–4 by Swindon Town. The defeat was manager Ince's first since returning to the club. The opening goal for Swindon was a 40 yards (37 m) lob of the goalkeeper, Willy Guéret by Jon-Paul McGovern.

They reached the Southern Area Final of the Johnstone's Paint Trophy before being beaten 4–1 on aggregate by Southampton.

== Competitions ==
=== League One ===
Final table

Pos	Team	Pld	W	D	L	GF	GA	GD	Pts
10	Walsall	46	16	14	16	60	63	−3	62
11	Bristol Rovers	46	19	5	22	59	70	−11	62
12	Milton Keynes Dons	46	17	9	20	60	68	–8	60
13	Brighton & Hove Albion	46	15	14	17	56	60	−4	59
14	Carlisle United	46	15	13	18	63	66	−3	58

Source: Sky Sports

Matches

Win	Draw	Loss

Date	Opponent	Venue	Result	Scorers	Attendance	Ref
8 August 2009 – 15:00	Hartlepool United	Home	0–0		8,965	
15 August 2009 – 15:00	Swindon Town	Away	0–0		6,692	
18 August 2009 – 19:45	Tranmere Rovers	Away	1–0	Ibehre	5,744	
22 August 2009 – 15:00	Colchester United	Home	2–1	Easter, Carrington	8,633	
29 August 2009 – 15:00	Exeter City	Away	2–1	Easter (2)	5,333	
5 September 2009 – 15:00	Huddersfield Town	Home	2–3	Johnson, Easter	9,772	
14 September 2009 – 19:45	Norwich City	Home	2–1	Puncheon, Leven	10,354	
19 September 2009 – 15:00	Wycombe Wanderers	Away	1–0	Kouo-Doumbé	6,127	
26 September 2009 – 15:00	Leeds United	Home	0–1		16,713	
29 September 2009 – 19:45	Oldham Athletic	Away	1–2	Brill (o.g.)	3,630	
3 October 2009 – 15:00	Brighton & Hove Albion	Away	1–0	Easter	6,419	
10 October 2009 – 15:00	Walsall	Home	1–0	Easter	8,919	
17 October 2009 – 15:00	Gillingham	Home	2–0	Easter, Wilbraham	11,764	
24 October 2009 – 15:00	Southampton	Away	1–3	Puncheon	21,387	
31 October 2009 – 15:00	Bristol Rovers	Home	2–1	Leven, Puncheon	9,711	
14 November 2009 – 15:00	Charlton Athletic	Away	1–5	Wilbraham	17,188	
20 November 2009 – 19:45	Southend United	Away	1–2	Baldock	6,957	
24 November 2009 – 19:45	Carlisle United	Home	3–4	Baldock, Chadwick (2)	9,459	
1 December 2009 – 19:45	Millwall	Away	2–3	Easter (2)	7,883	
5 December 2009 – 15:00	Yeovil Town	Home	2–2	Baldock, Leven	8,965	
12 December 2009 – 15:00	Leyton Orient	Away	2–1	Morgan, Quashie	3,959	
19 December 2009 – 15:00	Brentford	Home	0–1		9,520	
26 December 2009 – 15:00	Stockport County	Home	4–1	Easter, Quashie, Puncheon (2)	9,661	
28 December 2009 – 15:00	Huddersfield Town	Away	0–1		16,086	
16 January 2010 – 15:00	Hartlepool United	Away	5–0	Easter, Liddle (o.g.), Leven, Baldock, Puncheon	3,211	
23 January 2010 – 15:00	Tranmere Rovers	Home	1–0	Puncheon	9,438	
26 January 2010 – 19:45	Colchester United	Away	0–2		3,601	
30 January 2010 – 15:00	Exeter City	Home	1–1	Baldock	8,740	
6 February 2010 – 15:00	Stockport County	Away	3–1	Easter, Wilbraham, Townsend	3,720	
13 February 2010 – 15:00	Carlisle United	Away	0–5		4,930	
20 February 2010 – 15:00	Southend United	Home	3–1	Carrington (2), Townsend	9,801	
23 February 2010 – 19:45	Millwall	Away	1–3	Wilbraham	10,610	
27 February 2010 – 15:00	Yeovil Town	Away	0–1		3,844	
6 March 2010 – 15:00	Leyton Orient	Home	1–0	Carrington	14,323	
9 March 2010 – 19:45	Swindon Town	Home	2–1	Wilbraham, Tunnicliffe	8,764	
13 March 2010 – 15:00	Brentford	Away	3–3	Wilbraham (2), Easter	5,209	
20 March 2010 – 15:00	Southampton	Home	0–3		10,570	
27 March 2010 – 15:00	Gillingham	Away	2–2	McCracken, Easter	5,465	
3 April 2010 – 15:00	Charlton Athletic	Home	0–1		10,869	
5 April 2010 – 15:00	Bristol Rovers	Away	0–1		10,869	
10 April 2010 – 15:00	Norwich City	Away	1–1	Wilbraham	24,888	
13 April 2010 – 19:45	Oldham Athletic	Home	0–0		8,528	
17 April 2010 – 15:00	Wycombe Wanderers	Home	2–3	Wilbraham (2)	10,561	
24 April 2010 – 15:00	Leeds United	Away	1–4	Lewington	25,964	
1 May 2010 – 15:00	Brighton & Hove Albion	Home	0–0		12,023	
8 May 2010 – 15:00	Walsall	Away	1–2	Powell	4,772	

=== FA Cup ===
Matches

Win	Draw	Loss

Date	Round	Opponent	Venue	Result	Scorers	Attendance	Ref
7 November 2009 – 15:00	First round	Macclesfield Town	Home	1–0	Gobern	4,868	
28 November 2009 – 15:00	Second round	Exeter City	Home	4–3	Baldock (2), Devaney, Easter	4,867	
2 January 2010 – 15:00	Third round	Burnley	Home	1–2	Morgan	11,816	

=== League Cup ===
Matches

Win	Draw	Loss

Date	Round	Opponent	Venue	Result	Scorers	Attendance	Ref
13 August 2009 – 19:45	First round	Swindon Town	Home	1–4	Easter	4,812	

=== League Trophy ===
Matches

Win	Draw	Loss

Date	Round	Opponent	Venue	Result	Scorers	Attendance	Ref
1 September 2009 – 19:45	First round	Dagenham & Redbridge	Home	3–1	Lewington, Easter (2)	4,413	
6 October 2009 – 19:45	Second round	Southend United	Home	2–0	Doran, Carrington	4,792	
10 November 2009 – 19:45	Quarter-final (South)	Northampton Town	Home	3–1	Wilbraham, Baldock (2)	8,886	
15 December 2009 – 19:45	Semi-final (South)	Hereford United	Away	4–1	Baldock, Puncheon, Wilbraham, Easter	1,367	
20 January 2010 – 19:45	Area final (South) 1st leg	Southampton	Home	0–1		7,918	
9 February 2010 – 19:45	Area final (South) 2nd leg	Southampton	Away	1–3	Randall	29,901	

== Player details ==
List of squad players, including number of appearances by competition.
Players with squad numbers struck through and marked † left the club during the playing season.

No.	Pos	Nat	Player	Total		League One		FA Cup		League Cup		League Trophy	
No.	Pos	Nat	Player	Apps	Goals	Apps	Goals	Apps	Goals	Apps	Goals	Apps	Goals
2	DF	(England) ENG	Jude Stirling	10	0	9	0	1	0	0	0	0	0
3	DF	(England) ENG	Dean Lewington	50	2	42	1	3	0	0	0	5	1
4	DF	(France) FRA	Mathias Kouo-Doumbé	36	1	33	1	2	0	1	0	0	0
5	DF	(Scotland) SCO	David McCracken	44	1	41	1	2	0	1	0	0	0
6	DF	(England) ENG	Sean O'Hanlon	6	0	6	0	0	0	0	0	0	0
7	MF	(Republic of Ireland) IRL	Stephen Gleeson	32	0	29	0	3	0	0	0	0	0
8	FW	(Wales) WAL	Jermaine Easter	45	19	36	14	3	1	1	1	5	3
9	FW	(England) ENG	Aaron Wilbraham	43	12	35	10	3	0	0	0	5	2
10	FW	(United States) USA	Jemal Johnson	18	1	17	1	0	0	1	0	0	0
11	FW	(England) ENG	Sam Baldock	28	10	21	5	3	2	0	0	4	3
12	GK	(France) FRA	Willy Guéret	47	0	43	0	3	0	1	0	0	0
13	MF	(England) ENG	Mark Carrington	24	5	20	4	0	0	1	0	3	1
14	MF	(England) ENG	Lewis Gobern	21	1	19	0	1	1	1	0	0	0
~~16~~ †	MF	(Republic of Ireland) IRL	Richie Partridge	3	0	3	0	0	0	0	0	0	0
~~16~~ †	MF	(England) ENG	Jason Puncheon	32	8	24	7	3	0	1	0	4	1
16	DF	(England) ENG	James Tunnicliffe	9	1	9	1	0	0	0	0	0	0
17	GK	(England) ENG	Stuart Searle	3	0	3	0	0	0	0	0	0	0
19	FW	(England) ENG	Jabo Ibehre	10	1	10	1	0	0	0	0	0	0
20	DF	(England) ENG	Sol Davis	11	0	10	0	0	0	1	0	0	0
22	MF	(Scotland) SCO	Peter Leven	34	4	31	4	3	0	0	0	0	0
24	FW	(Montserrat) MSR	Dean Morgan	10	2	9	1	1	1	0	0	0	0
~~25~~ †	DF	(England) ENG	Danny Swailes	4	0	2	0	0	0	0	0	2	0
26	MF	(England) ENG	Luke Chadwick	44	2	40	2	3	0	1	0	0	0
27	MF	(England) ENG	David King	0	0	0	0	0	0	0	0	0	0
28	DF	(England) ENG	Adam Chicksen	6	0	6	0	0	0	0	0	0	0
~~29~~ †	DF	(England) ENG	Oscar Gobern	3	0	1	0	0	0	0	0	2	0
~~29~~ †	MF	(Scotland) SCO	Nigel Quashie	4	0	2	0	0	0	0	0	2	0
29	MF	(England) ENG	Mark Randall	18	1	16	0	0	0	0	0	2	1
30	FW	(England) ENG	Daniel Powell	2	1	2	1	0	0	0	0	0	0
31	DF	(Northern Ireland) NIR	Tom Flanagan	1	0	1	0	0	0	0	0	0	0
~~33~~ †	MF	(Republic of Ireland) IRL	Aaron Doran	5	1	4	0	0	0	0	0	1	1
35	FW	(England) ENG	Charlie Collins	2	0	2	0	0	0	0	0	0	0
~~35~~ †	MF	(Republic of Ireland) IRL	Martin Devaney	7	1	5	0	2	1	0	0	0	0
~~35~~ †	MF	(England) ENG	Andros Townsend	9	2	9	2	0	0	0	0	0	0
39	MF	(Scotland) SCO	Alex Rae	4	0	3	0	0	0	0	0	1	0

== Transfers ==
=== Transfers in ===
Date from	Position	Name	From	Fee	Ref.
1 July 2009	FW	(England) Jabo Ibehre	Walsall	Free transfer	
14 July 2009	FW	(United States) Jemal Johnson	Free agent (Note: Previous club: Milton Keynes Dons.)	Free transfer	
14 July 2009	FW	(Wales) Jermaine Easter	Plymouth Argyle	Undisclosed	
17 July 2009	GK	(England) Stuart Searle	Free agent (Note: Previous club: Watford.)	Free transfer	
21 July 2009	MF	(Republic of Ireland) Richie Partridge	Free agent (Note: Previous club: Chester City.)	Free transfer	
21 July 2009	MF	(England) Mark Carrington	Free agent (Note: Previous club: Crewe Alexandra.)	Free transfer	
6 August 2009	DF	(England) Sol Davis	Free agent (Note: Previous club: Luton Town.)	Free transfer	
7 August 2009	DF	(England) Darren Powell	Free agent (Note: Previous club: Brentford.)	Free transfer	
8 August 2009	FW	(England) Michael Bridges	Free agent (Note: Previous club: Hull City.)	Free transfer	
28 September 2009	FW	(Montserrat) Dean Morgan	Free agent (Note: Previous club: Grays Athletic.)	Free transfer	

=== Transfers out ===
Date from	Position	Name	To	Fee	Ref.
1 July 2009	GK	(England) Nathan Abbey	Released		
1 July 2009	FW	(Norway) Tore André Flo	Released		
1 July 2009	FW	(Canada) Ali Gerba	Released (Note: Joined Toronto FC in July 2009.)		
1 July 2009	FW	(United States) Jemal Johnson	Released (Note: Released, but re-joined on 14 July 2009.)		
1 July 2009	DF	(Spain) Miguel Llera	Released (Note: Joined Charlton Athletic on 2 July 2009.)		
1 July 2009	MF	(England) Alan Navarro	Released (Note: Joined Brighton & Hove Albion on 6 August 2009.)		
19 January 2010	DF	(England) Danny Swailes	Released (Note: Joined Stockport County on 19 January 2010.)		
19 January 2010	MF	(Republic of Ireland) Richie Partridge	Released		

=== Loans in ===
Start date	Position	Name	From	End date	Ref.
4 August 2009	MF	(England) Jason Puncheon	Plymouth Argyle	January 2010 (Note: Recalled. Originally until end of season.)	
5 October 2009	FW	(Republic of Ireland) Aaron Doran	Blackburn Rovers	5 November 2009	
24 November 2009	MF	(Scotland) Nigel Quashie	West Ham United	3 January 2010	
14 January 2010	FW	(England) Andros Townsend	Tottenham Hotspur	5 March 2010 (Note: Recalled. Originally until end of season.)	
11 February 2010	DF	(England) James Tunnicliffe	Brighton & Hove Albion	March 2010	

=== Loans out ===
Start date	Position	Name	To	End date	Ref.
4 August 2009	FW	(England) Daniel Powell	Crawley Town	September 2009	
2 October 2009	MF	(England) David King	Forest Green Rovers	December 2009	
26 November 2009	FW	(England) Jabo Ibehre	Southend United	26 December 2009	
19 January 2010	FW	(United States) Jemal Johnson	Stockport County	End of season	
19 January 2010	FW	(England) Jabo Ibehre	Stockport County	End of season	
