= Swing Shift (film) =

1984 romantic drama war film by Jonathan Demme

- Theatrical release poster by Steven Chorney
- Directed by: Jonathan Demme
- Written by: Nancy Dowd; Bo Goldman; Ron Nyswaner
- Produced by: Jerry Bick
- Starring: Goldie Hawn; Kurt Russell; Christine Lahti; Fred Ward; Ed Harris
- Cinematography: Tak Fujimoto
- Edited by: Gib Jaffe; Craig McKay
- Music by: Peter Allen; Bruce Langhorne; Patrick Williams
- Distributed by: Warner Bros. Pictures
- Release date: April 13, 1984
- Running time: 100 minutes
- Country: United States
- Language: English
- Budget: $15 million
- Box office: $6.6 million

Swing Shift is a 1984 American romantic drama directed by Jonathan Demme, and produced by and starring Goldie Hawn, with Kurt Russell. It also features Christine Lahti, Fred Ward, Ed Harris and Holly Hunter, in one of her earlier movie roles. The film was a box office bomb, grossing just $6.6 million against its $15 million budget. Lahti earned a nomination for the Academy Award for Best Supporting Actress.

== Plot ==
Jack Walsh enlists as a U.S. Naval Seaman shortly after the Japanese attack at Pearl Harbor, at the start of US involvement in World War II. His wife Kay signs up to work in an armaments factory in California while he is overseas in naval service.

Through the factory, the lonely and vulnerable Kay finally befriends her neighbor Hazel, a club singer. Months pass with Lucky, another factory worker and musician, hitting on her weekly until finally she agrees to go out with him after five months. Soon after arriving on their date, Kay spots her landlords, ducking out before they can spot her. She tells Lucky she can't as she's married, and goes home alone.

A short time later, the factory throws a party on the weekend to celebrate their success. Kay and Hazel eventually convince each other to go. At the jamboree Kay finally sees Lucky play the trumpet. This time she lets him take her home, finally falling for his charms.

The three of them enjoy their time together until Kay's husband comes home by surprise in the summer of 1944 on a 48h secret leave. Finding them at Hazel's, Jack collects Kay to their house.

Looking through the closet for his clothes, Jack sees the Leadman work shirt and assumes it's some man's. Kay explains she was promoted at the factory. Over dinner he bluntly confronts her, as he's realized what has occurred. The next morning Jack returns early to his ship.

Meanwhile, at the end of their shift at the factory, Lucky invites Hazel to the club. Afterwards, he takes her home and they sleep together. Kay shows up in a taxi, but upon seeing Hazel she returns home.

Later, Hazel comes over to Kay's and they seem to have made peace. However, the three go out together and a very drunk Kay and Hazel trade insults and Lucky takes Kay home. In the morning, he tells he's going on tour with a band.

The airplane factory lets the women go once the Japanese surrender, the servicemen come home. So Kay sends Lucky a farewell letter, Jack comes back to her, and Hazel marries the club owner.

== Cast ==
- Goldie Hawn as Kay Walsh
- Kurt Russell as Lucky Lockhart
- Christine Lahti as Hazel Zanussi
- Fred Ward as Biscuits Toohey
- Ed Harris as Jack Walsh
- Sudie Bond as Annie
- Holly Hunter as Jeannie
- Patty Maloney as Laverne
- Lisa Pelikan as Violet
- Susan Peretz as Edith
- Joey Aresco as Johnny Bonnaro
- Charles Napier as Moon Willis
- Stephen Tobolowsky as French deMille
- Alana Stewart as Frankie Parker
- Phillip Christon as Recruit at Egyptian
- Belita Moreno as Mabel Stoddard

== Production ==
The original screenplay for the film was written by Nancy Dowd. Dowd's script was subsequently rewritten by Bo Goldman, and then by Ron Nyswaner, whose work was used for the final shooting script. Principal photography began in March 1983 after several delays. Initial production completed by June 1983, with Demme's cut focused on the friendship between Kay and Hazel.

According to Hawn, Warner Bros. Pictures did not like Demme's original cut of the film. Hawn felt that the motivation for her character was unclear, stating: "She was the one who was why you wanted to watch this movie, in that you wanted to see the arc of her character. . .So if you don't follow the line of this lady, then you don't quite know what anybody has achieved here. What happened was that Jonathan's focus went off her at, I felt, very crucial moments, and so did the studio.. .And it was not about me at all. It was about the movie." According to Demme, Hawn wanted the relationship between her character and Kurt Russell's to be at the forefront of the film. Warner Bros. sided with Hawn which Demme believed was because Hawn's previous film Private Benjamin had been successful at the box office.

In December 1983, Warner Bros ordered reshoots. 30 minutes of additional scenes were shot to make Hazel "more sympathetic" and to emphasize her love triangle, which pushed the film's release date from February 1984 to April 1984, and increased its budget from $14 million to $15–17 million. Demme stated he was "profoundly disappointed" by the reshoots, and walked away from the project with editor Craig McKay, "rather than participate in work we didn’t believe in." Demme ultimately kept his directorial credit, but removed the phrase "A Jonathan Demme Film" from the finished movie and its advertising. Dowd removed her name from the finished version of the film and is credited under the pseudonym "Rob Morton," after agreeing with Warner Bros. not to discuss the film publicly; Dowd was later awarded sole screen credit (pseudonymously) in a Writers’ Guild hearing. Hawn maintained that she and her producing partner Anthea Sylbert were "just trying to get the movie to work" by recutting it.

== Reception ==
=== Critical response ===
Swing Shift holds a rating of 87% on Rotten Tomatoes, based on 15 reviews. Metacritic, which uses a weighted average, assigned the film a score of 60 out of 100, based on 12 critics, indicating "mixed or average" reviews. Audiences polled by CinemaScore gave the film an average grade of "C+" on an A+ to F scale.

Roger Ebert of the Chicago Sun-Times gave the film three stars out of four, writing: "There's no suspense and no big emotional payoff, but the movie is always absorbing...", and stated that “This may be the first ever buddy movie starring two women.” Gene Siskel of the Chicago Tribune awarded two-and-a-half stars out of four and wrote "Although the World War II drama does manage to work up considerable emotion for a few big moments, we also find the script wanting at as many moments. One more run through the typewriter would have helped." Vincent Canby of The New York Times wrote "Despite what seem to have been certain differences of opinion in the course of the production, 'Swing Shift' plays very smoothly. No one need be ashamed." Gary Arnold of The Washington Post wrote "Its elaborate and meticulously re-created period settings and moods prove far more interesting and diverting than the undernourished characterizations and love stories that flutter and sputter across the foregrounds." Variety found that the characters "were not people worth fighting a war for" and remarked that while "[g]reat drama, to be sure, does not depend on likeable characters...the writing and acting are too flat for the challenge." Sheila Benson of the Los Angeles Times stated "Weak, flat, mystifyingly inconsistent, the present version is understandably disownable." Pauline Kael of The New Yorker wrote "There are no high spots, no exciting moments. The picture just goes popping from one recessive, undeveloped scene to the next." Steve Jenkins of The Monthly Film Bulletin wrote "Given the pseudonymous script credit, covering the contributions of three writers, and the serious disputes between Jonathan Demme and Goldie Hawn during production, it is perhaps not surprising that Swing Shift should emerge as a disappointingly bland, muddled and inconclusive affair."

Steve Vineberg of Sight & Sound called Jonathan Demme's original cut "extraordinary – one of the best movies made by an American in the 80s." He described the recut version of Demme's film as "a Hollywood tragedy. It echoes what RKO did to Orson Welles' The Magnificent Ambersons."

=== Awards and nominations ===
Award	Category	Nominee	Result	Ref.
Academy Awards	Best Supporting Actress	Christine Lahti	Nominated	
Golden Globe Awards	Best Supporting Actress – Motion Picture	Christine Lahti	Nominated	
Los Angeles Film Critics Association Awards	Best Supporting Actress	Christine Lahti	Nominated	
New York Film Critics Circle Awards	Best Supporting Actress	Christine Lahti	Won	
