= 2007 Football League Cup final =

- The match programme cover
- Event: 2006–07 Football League Cup
Chelsea	Arsenal
2	1
- Date: 25 February 2007
- Venue: Millennium Stadium, Cardiff
- Man of the Match: Didier Drogba (Chelsea)
- Referee: Howard Webb (South Yorkshire)
- Attendance: 70,073
- Weather: Mostly cloudy 8 °C (46 °F)

The 2007 Football League Cup final was a football match between Chelsea and Arsenal on 25 February 2007 at the Millennium Stadium, Cardiff. It was the final match of the 2006–07 staging of the Football League Cup, and last to be staged at the Millennium Stadium. Chelsea were making their fifth League Cup final appearance to Arsenal's sixth.

Each club needed to get past four rounds to reach the final. Chelsea made comfortable progress; they scored 12 goals while conceding only one to Wycombe Wanderers in the semi-final. Arsenal fielded a relatively young team throughout the competition; their wins against fellow league opponents Liverpool in the fifth-round and Tottenham Hotspur in the semis were acclaimed by the British press. Chelsea entered the match as favourites and were undefeated against Arsenal in all competitions since 2004.

Watched by a crowd of 70,073, Arsenal took the lead in the 12th minute when Theo Walcott scored. Chelsea equalised moments later through Didier Drogba, who also scored the match winner six minutes from the end of normal time. Midway through the second half, Chelsea captain John Terry was accidentally kicked in the face after attempting to score with a diving header; he played no further part in the match having sought medical attention. Stoppage time was extended because of the incident, at which point a fracas occurred between the Arsenal and Chelsea players. Kolo Touré and Emmanuel Adebayor were dismissed for their actions, together with Chelsea's Mikel John Obi. Play came to an end in the 102nd minute.

Chelsea manager José Mourinho was delighted with his team's win and credited his opponent's performance. He felt the brawl in stoppage time was born out of Arsenal's frustration after going behind in the match; he did not want either team to be punished. Arsenal manager Arsène Wenger apologised for his players' conduct and said he had no regrets over his team selection. Both finalists were fined £100,000 each by The Football Association for their inability to control their players. Emmanuel Eboué was retrospectively banned for three matches as his punch on Wayne Bridge was missed by Howard Webb. Wenger was later found guilty of improper conduct and charged £2,500 for his comments about the linesman.

== Route to the final ==
The Football League Cup is a football competition open to the 92 teams in the Premier League and the Football League.

=== Chelsea ===
Round	Opposition	Score
3rd	Blackburn Rovers (a)	2–0
4th	Aston Villa (h)	4–0
5th	Newcastle United (a)	1–0
Semi-final	Wycombe Wanderers (a)	1–1
Semi-final	Wycombe Wanderers (h)	4–0
Key: (h) = Home venue; (a) = Away venue.

Chelsea entered the competition in the third round, as one of the eight teams from the Premier League involved in European competition during the season. They were drawn against Blackburn Rovers; the match took place at Ewood Park. A goal apiece from Joe Cole and Salomon Kalou ensured a 2–0 victory.

Chelsea's opponent in the fourth round were Aston Villa. The match was played at Stamford Bridge on 8 November 2006. Frank Lampard opened the scoring for Chelsea in the 32nd minute; further goals by Andriy Shevchenko, Michael Essien and Didier Drogba in the second half secured a 4–0 win.

Newcastle United hosted Chelsea at St James' Park in the fifth round of the competition. The home team came close to scoring after the midway point of the first half; Obafemi Martins's shot towards the Chelsea goal hit the underside of the crossbar and bounced down, before the ball was cleared. In the 79th minute, Drogba – on as a substitute – scored the winning goal of the match, from a free-kick.

Wycombe Wanderers were Chelsea's opponent in the semi-final which was played over two-legs. The first leg was staged at Wycombe's home ground, Adams Park. A match preview in The Guardian noted the financial gap between the two sides: "Wycombe's most expensive player, Jermaine Easter, cost £80,000; Chelsea's squad is valued at more than £300m." In the game Wycombe started brightly, but the team were unable to convert their chances. Chelsea took the lead in the 36th minute when Wayne Bridge collected a pass from Kalou and chipped the ball over Ricardo Batista, the Wycombe goalkeeper. Easter equalised for Wycombe with 13 minutes of the match remaining; neither side scored again and the match ended 1–1. The second leg at Stamford Bridge saw Chelsea start better of the two sides and two goals apiece from Shevchenko and Lampard meant they won 4–0 on the night, 5–1 on aggregate score to progress to the final.

=== Arsenal ===
Round	Opposition	Score
3rd	West Bromwich Albion (a)	2–0
4th	Everton (a)	1–0
5th	Liverpool (a)	6–3
Semi-final	Tottenham Hotspur (a)	2–2
Semi-final	Tottenham Hotspur (h)	3–1
Key: (h) = Home venue; (a) = Away venue.

Arsenal entered the competition in the third round as they participated in European football during the season. They faced West Bromwich Albion at The Hawthorns, where striker Jérémie Aliadière scored twice to secure a 2–0 victory for the visitors.

Arsenal travelled to Goodison Park in the fourth round of the competition to play Everton. They won the match 1–0 courtesy of a late Emmanuel Adebayor goal, which came from a corner. For much of the game Everton played with a man disadvantage as striker James McFadden was sent off in the 19th minute for dissent.

Closing stages of Arsenal's second leg match against Tottenham Hotspur at the Emirates Stadium.

Liverpool were Arsenal's opponent in the fifth round. The match, scheduled on 19 December 2006 at Anfield, was postponed by referee Martin Atkinson because of heavy fog. Atkinson's decision infuriated the managers of both clubs, with Rafael Benítez commenting: "There were a lot of people looking forward to the game and it's really difficult to explain." The tie was rescheduled for 9 January 2007 and on the night Arsenal took the lead when Aliadière scored in the 27th minute. Robbie Fowler equalised for Liverpool six minutes later. Later, two goals from Júlio Baptista and goal from Alex Song put Arsenal 4–1 ahead at half time. In the second half, Baptista completed his hat-trick; although Steven Gerrard and Sami Hyypiä scored to close the scoreline gap for Liverpool, Baptista added his fourth goal of the match in the 84th minute. The final score was 6–3, Liverpool's heaviest defeat at Anfield in 76 years. In his match report for The Guardian, Daniel Taylor praised Arsenal's reserve team and summarised: "The difference between the two teams was immense. Arsenal played with flair and purpose; Liverpool were dishevelled and short of leadership."

Tottenham Hotspur faced Arsenal in the semi-final which was played over two-legs. The first leg was at Tottenham's home ground, White Hart Lane. A goal from Dimitar Berbatov gave Tottenham the lead in the 12th minute and they extended their advantage after Baptista inadvertently kicked the ball into his own goal. Baptista, however, made amends in the second half, scoring twice in the space of 13 minutes to level the score at 2–2. The second leg at the Emirates Stadium saw Arsenal take the lead in the 77th minute when Adebayor scored. Mido equalised for Tottenham, which took the match into extra time because the away goals rule was not in use in the competition. Aliadière's goal in the 105th minute restored Arsenal's lead and an own goal scored by Pascal Chimbonda ensured the home team progressed to the final, winning 3–1 after extra time, and 5–3 on aggregate.

== Build-up ==
Chelsea, the match favourites, were appearing in their fifth League Cup final; they had previously won the competition three times in 1965, 1998 and 2005, and lost one final in 1972. By contrast Arsenal made their sixth League Cup final appearance; they had won two in 1987 and 1993 and lost three in 1968, 1969 and 1988. Both clubs had played each other in the League Cup four times, with Chelsea and Arsenal each winning on two occasions. Chelsea's biggest win against Arsenal in the competition was a 5–0 away win in November 1998. Prior to the match Arsenal's last win against Chelsea in all competitions came in February 2004.

The relationship between both clubs had become strained, not least because of Chelsea's financial advantage; the club was owned by billionaire Roman Abramovich. The day after Chelsea announced losses of £80 million for 2005–06, Arsenal manager Arsène Wenger expressed concern over his opponent's conduct: "I have said many times that all the clubs should be balanced with their natural resources. That means they can only spend what they earn." Chelsea manager José Mourinho refused to respond to Wenger's comments in his UEFA Champions League pre-match press conference, but made reference to his record in the competition in contrast to his counterpart: "Many great managers in the world have never won it. The big example is not far from us; Arsène Wenger is a top manager in the world. He's a big manager in the world of football and he never did it so when I did it once, I can thank God for that. I have that."

"You have singers in England going on The X Factor where talents are discovered which nobody knew about. I like it because people are brave enough to come out and they want to achieve something in their life. They are ready to be committed to do it. They have a target. People who turn up and are ready to fight for something, like our young players are, I like. It's the X Factor Academy!"

— Arsène Wenger, February 2007

Wenger replied to Mourinho's comments by arguing that although plenty of managers have won the Champions League, most would not be considered greats – "What is important is that you look at their careers in 10, 15 or 20 years. What kind of quality have you brought through in your work and on how consistent a level have you done it?"

Much was made of Arsenal's policy of using the League Cup to field youngsters. In order to explain his team selection, Wenger made an analogy between his youth players and hopefuls on The X Factor, a television programme he admired. He ruled out playing his more experienced players for the match: "We battled very hard to be in this final and it would be a reward for this team, which has risen up to every challenge." Mourinho did not anticipate Arsenal would make a "crazy change" to their team: "Normally, they change players but keep their philosophy, their idea of football, their system." He believed the final had the makings of a showpiece event as the competition was not a main target for both clubs; emotions therefore would not dictate matters.

Both clubs received an allocation of approximately 30,000 tickets. The competition sponsor Carling gave up its allocation; they instead invited 200 fans of Arsenal and Chelsea to be seated in their suite. Supporters of the four semi-final clubs were invited to participate in the "Carling Cabinet"; this gave them the opportunity to have their say about the matchday experience. Ticket prices for adults were priced £36, £48, £64 and £74, with concessions for juniors and seniors. For every ticket sold, the Football League gave £1 to Children in Need; the donation came at a total of £70,000.

Chelsea were expected to line up in a 4–4–2 formation, with Essien in central defence. They had doubts about the fitness of captain John Terry going into the final. He appeared to have damaged his ankle ligaments during the first leg of Chelsea's Champions League tie with Porto, though passed a fitness test just days after. Arsenal were expected to line up in a similar formation, with Baptista and Aliadière up front.

Train delays caused by a "major signal failure" meant that on the day of the final over 2,000 spectators were late for kick-off. An accident on the M4 motorway trigged more chaos; this led to requests for the game to be delayed, but South Wales Police were confident they could get everyone seated in time. Network Rail later apologised for the delay.

== Match ==
Chelsea set up in a 4–1–3–2 formation with Terry partnering Ricardo Carvalho in defence. Claude Makélélé played behind a midfield three made up of Lampard, Ballack and Essien. By contrast Arsenal lined up in a 4–4–2 formation; Abou Diaby and Theo Walcott were positioned either side of central midfielders Cesc Fàbregas and Denílson and provided width. Arsenal's starting line up – averaging 21 years – was the youngest to play in a major English cup final. Before the match commenced, the national anthem was sung by Juliette Pochin.

=== Summary ===
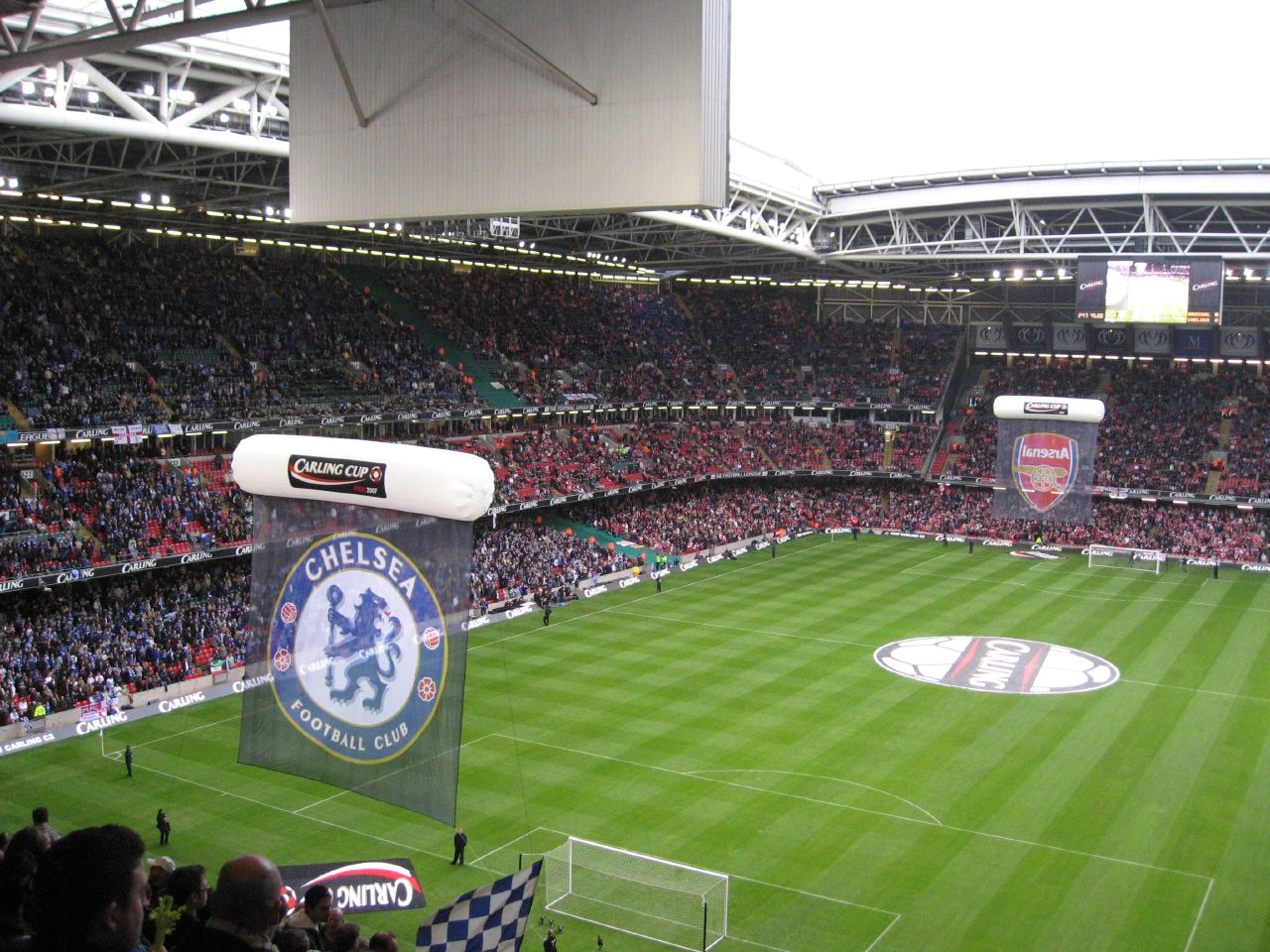
Pre-match presentation

Arsenal kicked off and started strongly, with Fàbregas dictating play in midfield. Baptista came close to scoring in the seventh minute, but for his shot to be blocked by Terry. Another shot of his three minutes later was saved by Petr Čech, who tipped the ball over the crossbar. This resulted in an Arsenal corner, which Drogba cleared. Walcott immediately collected the ball, passed it to Diaby before receiving it once more in the Chelsea penalty box. He sidefooted the ball past Čech and into the Chelsea goal to give Arsenal a 1–0 lead; it was his first goal for the club. Arsenal's tempo and the speed in which they passed the ball continued to cause Chelsea problems. Walcott in the 14th minute used his pace to get the better of defenders Bridge and Carvalho and crossed the ball to Baptista, who lost his footing.

Chelsea created their first chance of the match after 18 minutes – a shot from Lampard which hit Kolo Touré. They fought back to equalise two minutes later. Ballack launched the ball to Drogba on the right-hand side of Arsenal's penalty area. Diverting his markers who attempted to set the offside trap, Drogba took the ball and shot it past Manuel Almunia's goal to score. The equaliser led to Chelsea asserting themselves in the match as the team began to build up possession. Denílson, at the midway point of the half, received the game's first yellow card for a foul on Essien; the Chelsea midfielder was later booked for a tackle on Baptista. Sticks of celery were thrown at Fàbregas before he took a corner close to stoppage time; targeting opponents with the vegetable was a Chelsea supporter's ritual going back more than two decades and originated from song.

Chelsea made an attacking substitution before the start of the second half; Arjen Robben came on for Makélélé. He made an immediate impact, running past the Arsenal defence in the 48th minute, but his pass failed to reach Shevchenko. Soon after Carvalho was booked for a foul on Aliadière and conceded a free-kick at the edge of Chelsea's penalty box, though nothing came out of it. Both teams continued to fashion chances – a well worked move by Arsenal finished with Fàbregas's shooting low past Čech in goal, while Chelsea's Robben from 20 yards curled the ball wide. Lassana Diarra was shown a yellow card in the 52nd minute for his challenge on Diaby; the Arsenal midfielder managed to get past Ballack and Lampard before he was "deliberately bowled over" by his opponent. Robben earned Chelsea a corner moments after; from it, Terry attempted a diving header and Diaby, in an attempt to clear, ended up kicking the Chelsea captain, thus knocking him out. After receiving medical attention Terry was immediately stretchered off and taken to the hospital; he was replaced by Mikel John Obi and Essien was moved to centre back.

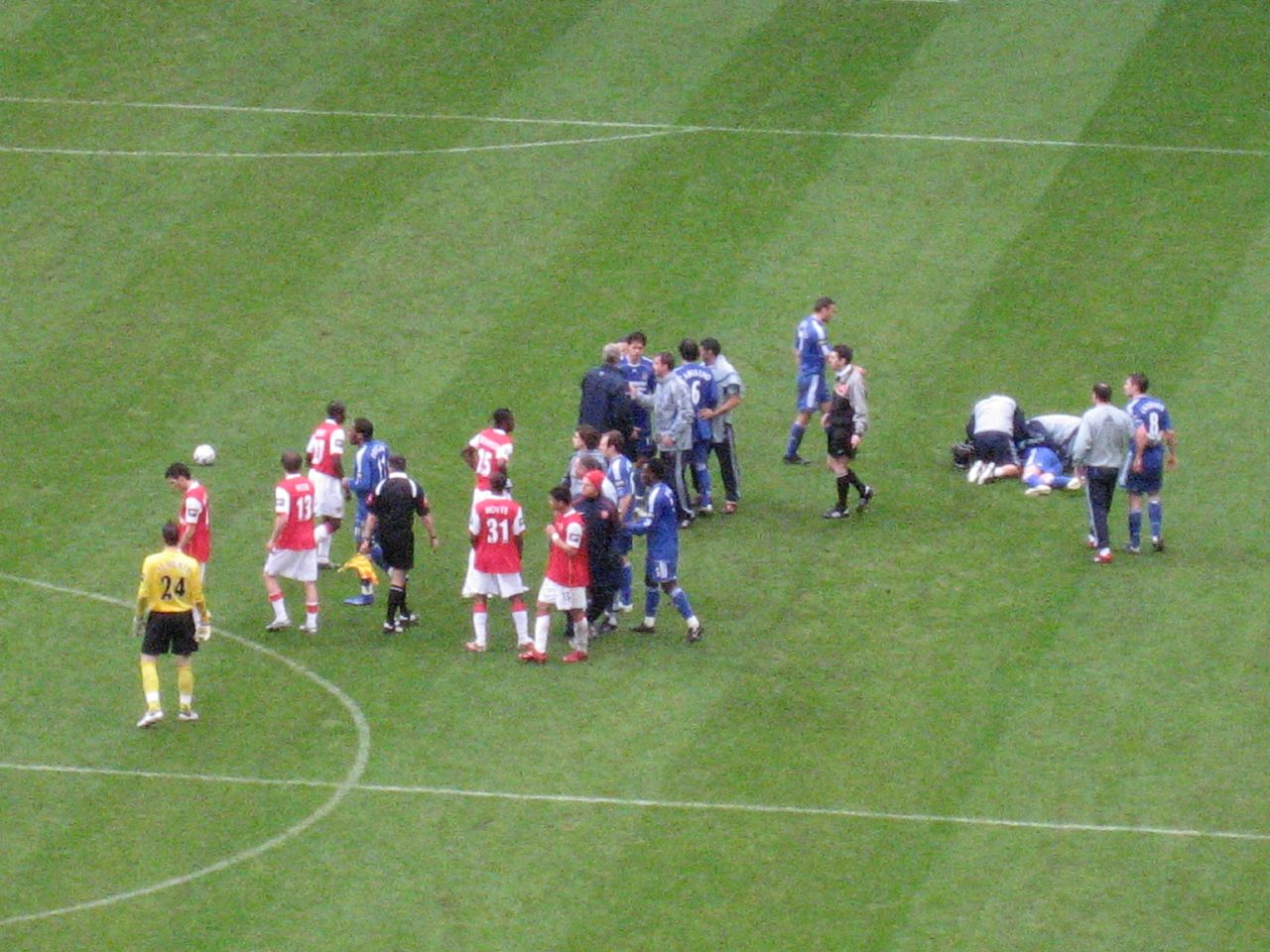
Fracas between the Arsenal and Chelsea players

The period immediately after Terry's substitution saw few clear-cut chances, with Walcott and Drogba barely testing their respective keepers. Arsenal made two substitutions in a three-minute spell – Armand Traoré for Emmanuel Eboué and Alexander Hleb replacing the injured Diaby. In the 74th minute a shot by Lampard from 25 yards hit Almunia's crossbar. Arsenal responded with a flowing move from left to right, which resulted in a corner. Chelsea cleared and countered, forcing Almunia to save. Arsenal made their final substitution in the 80th minute, replacing Aliadière with Adebayor. With six minutes remaining of the 90, Chelsea scored the winning goal of the match. Arsenal gave away possession to Essien in midfield, who passed the ball to Robben wide on the left. He crossed the ball into the Arsenal penalty area, which reached the head of Drogba; the striker headed it in past Almunia.

Shevchenko came close to scoring Chelsea's third goal of the match, but his effort hit the crossbar. Seven minutes of stoppage time were added to the match due to Terry's injury. A tussle between Touré and Mikel over shirt pulling resulted in a fracas between both sets of players. Both managers came onto the pitch in order to calm matters. Referee Howard Webb decided to send off Touré and Mikel for violent conduct and consulted with an assistant referee, before sending off Adebayor, who was alleged to have struck Bridge. Adebayor was irate and needed to be escorted off the field by Arsenal officials. The match restarted, by which point Kalou came on for Shevchenko.

No further goals were scored and the full-time whistle eventually blew in the 102nd minute of play. Terry who was admitted to hospital later discharged himself and returned to the stadium to celebrate with his teammates.

=== Details ===
25 February 2007
15:00 GMT

Chelsea	2–1	Arsenal
Drogba 20', 84'	Report	Walcott 12'

Millennium Stadium, Cardiff
Attendance: 70,073
Referee: Howard Webb (South Yorkshire)

Chelsea	Arsenal

GK	1	(Czech Republic) Petr Čech
RB	19	(France) Lassana Diarra	(yellow card) 52'
CB	26	(England) John Terry (c)		(substituted off) 63'
CB	6	(Portugal) Ricardo Carvalho	(yellow card) 49'
LB	18	(England) Wayne Bridge
DM	4	(France) Claude Makélélé		(substituted off) 45'
CM	8	(England) Frank Lampard	(yellow card) 90+6'
CM	13	(Germany) Michael Ballack
CM	5	(Ghana) Michael Essien	(yellow card) 36'
CF	7	(Ukraine) Andriy Shevchenko		(substituted off) 90+9'
CF	11	(Ivory Coast) Didier Drogba
Substitutes:
GK	40	(Portugal) Hilário
DF	3	(England) Ashley Cole
MF	12	(Nigeria) Mikel John Obi	(red card) 90+6'	(substituted on) 63'
MF	16	(Netherlands) Arjen Robben		(substituted on) 45'
FW	21	(Ivory Coast) Salomon Kalou		(substituted on) 90+9'
Manager:
(Portugal) José Mourinho

GK	24	(Spain) Manuel Almunia
RB	31	(England) Justin Hoyte
CB	5	(Ivory Coast) Kolo Touré (c)	(red card) 90+6'
CB	6	(Switzerland) Philippe Senderos
LB	45	(France) Armand Traoré		(substituted off) 66'
RM	32	(England) Theo Walcott
CM	4	(Spain) Cesc Fàbregas	(yellow card) 90+6'
CM	15	(Brazil) Denílson	(yellow card) 29'
LM	2	(France) Abou Diaby		(substituted off) 68'
CF	30	(France) Jérémie Aliadière		(substituted off) 80'
CF	9	(Brazil) Júlio Baptista
Substitutes:
GK	21	(Estonia) Mart Poom
DF	20	(Switzerland) Johan Djourou
DF	27	(Ivory Coast) Emmanuel Eboué	(yellow card) 88'	(substituted on) 66'
MF	13	(Belarus) Alexander Hleb		(substituted on) 68'
FW	25	(Togo) Emmanuel Adebayor	(red card) 90+6'	(substituted on) 80'
Manager:
(France) Arsène Wenger

Match officials

- Assistant referees:
  - Darren Cann
  - Dave Babski
- Fourth official: Lee Probert (Wiltshire)

Man of the match

- Didier Drogba (Chelsea)

Match rules

- 90 minutes.
- 30 minutes of extra-time if necessary.
- Penalty shootout if scores still level.
- Five named substitutes.
- Maximum of three substitutions.

=== Statistics ===
Statistic	Chelsea	Arsenal
Goals scored	2	1
Possession	49%	51%
Shots on target	3	6
Shots off target	6	4
Corner kicks	2	6
Offsides	9	1
Yellow cards	4	3
Red cards	1	2

== Post-match and aftermath ==
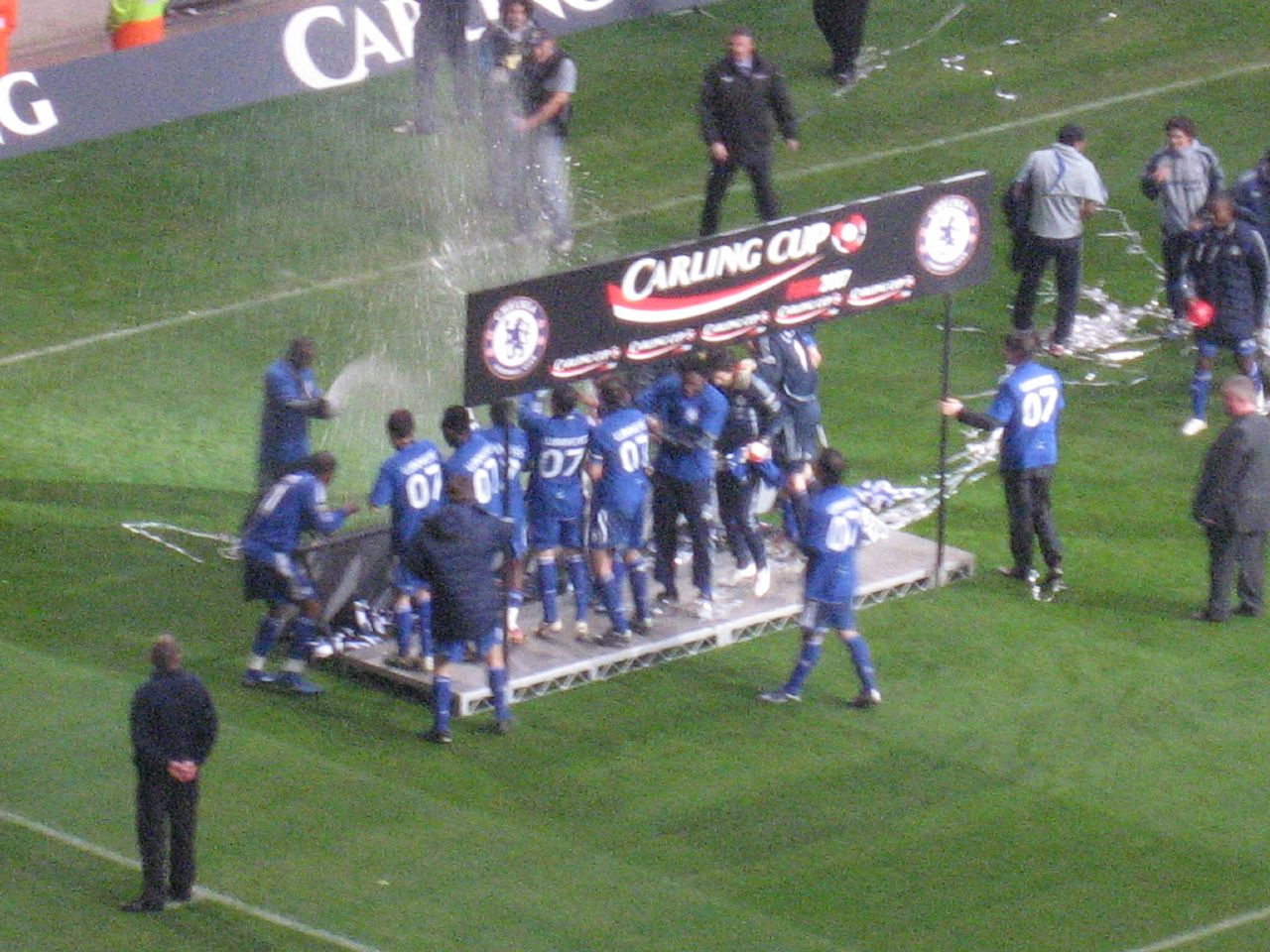
The Chelsea players celebrating their victory

Chelsea's victory meant they won the trophy for the sixth time. Mourinho was delighted to have won the League Cup and felt his team deserved to win on balance of play. He credited his opponents, with a sly dig: "A special word for them – they played very good. They have a great coach, great players – but football is about winning and the cup goes to us." He was disappointed by the fracas and pointed out it was born out of Arsenal's frustration, though stressed "We cannot kill a player because something happened." Mourinho took time out to praise Arsenal's medical staff for attending to Terry after his concussion and absolved Diaby from any fault.

Lampard described his teammate Drogba as “...special, he's the best in the world at the moment. He does it week in, week out and on the big occasions." He argued the brawl near the end of the match highlighted how much the players from both sides wanted to win. Defender Ashley Cole, who left Arsenal in acrimonious terms to join Chelsea felt his decision to move was vindicated: "I'm enjoying life, the manager's good and after six or seven months here I've already won a medal. That's why I came here."

Wenger apologised for his team's behaviour: "I feel we should not have reacted at all. Overall we are sorry for what happened. When you do not behave like you want to, then you have to apologise." He had no regrets over his team selection and suggested it was part of the player's learning process. Wenger said of Walcott: "...he had a very good performance and scored a great goal. That is good for us and good news for England." Gilberto Silva described Arsenal's defeat as a "sad memory" and wanted to use the loss to motivate the team for their coming matches.

The day after the final Arsenal and Chelsea submitted claims for wrongful dismissal of Adebayor and Mikel, respectively, to The Football Association (FA). The FA denied both appeals and clarified their penalties. Eboué was charged with violent conduct for striking Bridge, whereas Adebayor was charged for his behaviour after being sent off. Both players were suspended for three matches – one less than Mikel. Arsenal and Chelsea were charged with misconduct concerning their inability to control their players and were fined £100,000 each. Wenger criticised the FA's treatment of his players and accused the linesman of lying in his account of Adebayor's actions. This led to an investigation where Wenger was found guilty; he was later fined £2,500 and censured by the FA.

"Since I arrived, they have won nothing. Since we are at Chelsea, they lost Premierships, they lost the Charity Shield to us, they lost the Carling Cup to us. I don't think they are winning a lot. Absolutely brilliant young boys, manager top, team with a great future. But they didn't win."

— José Mourinho on Arsenal, February 2007

Journalists reviewing the match praised Arsenal's young team; some however went as far to criticise their conduct in the brawl. Henry Winter wrote in The Daily Telegraph of 26 February 2007 "...all feline grace and youthful ambition, [Arsenal] were the better team, moving the ball around exquisitely at times," while Glenn Moore of The Independent reflected "the Arsenal manager can take great consolation from the quality of his young footballers." The Guardian correspondent Kevin McCarra opened his match report with the line "To Chelsea the trophy, to Arsenal the future," and felt the latter club deserved plaudits for the role they played in the final, and competition as a whole. He commended Chelsea's adversity and singled out Carvalho as an example; at fault for Arsenal's goal, the defender's performance thereafter was faultless. Matt Dickinson of The Times agreed that Arsenal had played the better football, but said their temperament was "brittle" – "[They] had lost the trophy before they lost their heads." Football pundit Alan Hansen was scathing of Arsenal's behaviour and suggested their inexperience had a part to play: "When they reflect upon it, Arsenal will admit that they were largely in the wrong." He was critical of Wenger's team selection and felt the big clubs saw the competition, much like the FA Cup as an irrelevance. The violence and sendings off on the pitch led to some media outlets dubbing the match as the "Snarling Cup final", or in the case of Winter's match report the "Carnage Cup final".

This was the seventh and last League Cup final to be played at the Millennium Stadium in Cardiff, before the opening of the new Wembley Stadium, the final's traditional venue. The match was broadcast live in the United Kingdom on Sky Sports 1; the channel's coverage averaged at 2.7 million viewers, with a peak audience of 3.2 million (24.88%) at 5pm. At the time it was the biggest multichannel audience of 2007, overtaking a football match between Arsenal and Manchester United in January.

Chelsea's first match after the final was against Portsmouth in the Premier League. A 2–0 win ensured they remained in contention for the league, though by May finished in second place. Chelsea did however beat Manchester United to win the 2007 FA Cup final and complete a cup double. Arsenal played Blackburn Rovers a few days after the final in an FA Cup replay. They lost the match 1–0; it was Arsenal's third defeat in all competitions which represented their worst run of form in five years.

== See also ==
- Arsenal F.C.–Chelsea F.C. rivalry
