= Jérémie Aliadière =

French football player (born 1983)

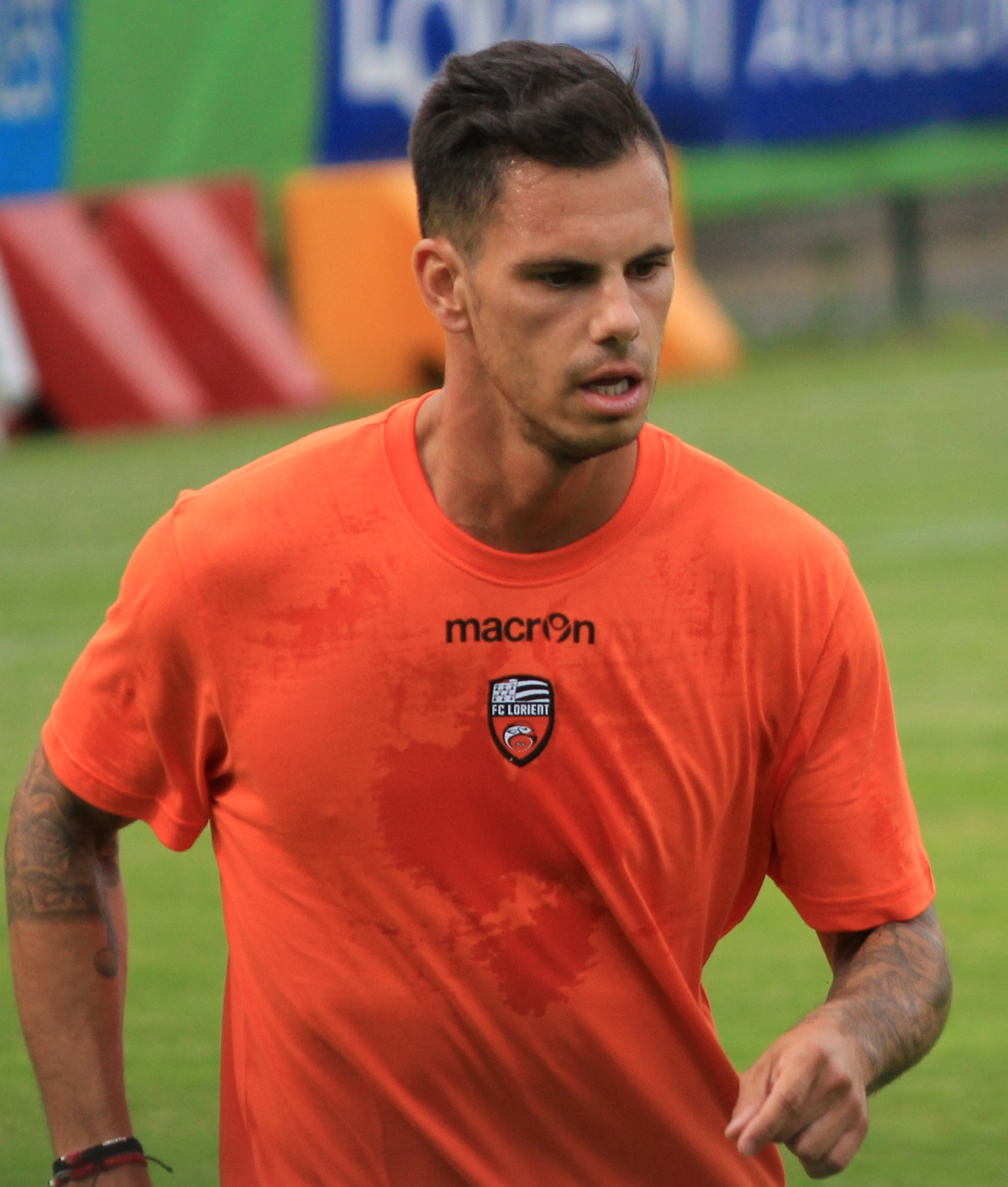
- Aliadière training with Lorient in 2013

Personal information
- Full name: Jérémie Aliadière
- Date of birth: 30 March 1983 (age 43)
- Place of birth: Rambouillet, France
- Height: 1.83 m (6 ft 0 in)
- Position: Striker

Youth career
- 1998–1999: Clairefontaine
- 1999–2001: Arsenal

Senior career*
Years	Team	Apps	(Gls)
2001–2007	Arsenal	29	(1)
2005	→ Celtic (loan)	0	(0)
2005–2006	→ West Ham United (loan)	7	(0)
2006	→ Wolverhampton Wanderers (loan)	14	(2)
2007–2010	Middlesbrough	78	(11)
2011–2014	Lorient	76	(25)
2014–2016	Umm Salal	37	(9)
2016	Muaither	0	(0)
2016–2017	Lorient	13	(1)
2016	Lorient B	1	(0)
Total		255	(49)

International career
2004	France U21	5	(1)
- * Club domestic league appearances and goals

Jérémie Aliadière (French pronunciation: [ʒeʁemi aljadjɛʁ]; born 30 March 1983) is a French former professional footballer who played as a striker.

As a graduate of the elite Clairefontaine academy, he signed for Arsenal at the age of 16. During his career he also played for Celtic in the Scottish Premier League, West Ham United in the Premier League, and Wolverhampton Wanderers, before returning to Arsenal for another season. At the beginning of the 2007–08 season he was sold to Premier League club Middlesbrough for £2.5 million.

In 2011 the striker signed for Lorient playing for Les Merlus til 2014. In September 2016, it was announced that Aliadière would be returning to the Stade du Moustoir, once again playing for Lorient.

== Early life ==
Aliadière was born in Rambouillet, Yvelines.

== Club career ==
=== Arsenal ===
Aliadière signed for Arsenal at the age of 16 before the beginning of the 1999–2000 season. He made his Premier League debut for Arsenal against Fulham in the 2001–02 season, replacing Thierry Henry in a 4–1 victory. That game was his only league appearance that season, meaning he was not eligible for a medal as Arsenal won the 2001–02 FA Premier League. He scored his first goal for the club the following season, in a 5–2 victory over West Bromwich Albion on 27 August 2002.

In the 2003–04 season, Aliadière was mainly played in the 2003–04 League Cup rather than the league, scoring Arsenal's first League Cup goal of the season against Rotherham United. The match finished 1–1 after extra time, with Arsenal winning 9–8 on penalties. He also scored twice against Wolverhampton Wanderers in the following round of the League Cup, his second winning goal for the month for December. In total, he scored four goals in the cup run, having also scored against West Brom in the quarter-finals, with Arsenal finally being eliminated by Middlesbrough in the semi-finals. He was voted best young talent in the 2003–04 League Cup. As the season progressed, he made further inroads into the Arsenal first team, playing ten Premier League matches, seven as a substitute, to gain a Premier League winners' medal, as well as making his FA Cup debut in a 1–0 defeat against Manchester United in the semi-finals. He also came on as a late substitute in Arsenal's 5–1 victory over Inter Milan in the San Siro. Seconds after coming on, he set up the fifth goal for Robert Pires.

Aliadière missed much of the following 2004–05 season after picking up an injury in the 2004 FA Community Shield, and was kept out of action until March. On his return, he made six substitute appearances for the first team, including the FA Cup semi-final against Blackburn Rovers. Although he failed to score in these matches, he scored eight goals in five games for Arsenal's reserves. Despite his limited opportunities and being linked with a move to Paris Saint-Germain, he was offered and signed a new Arsenal contract, running until the summer of 2009, announced at the same time as a loan move to Celtic.

==== Loan to Celtic ====
In the summer of 2005, Aliadière was sent on loan to Scottish club Celtic for the entire 2005–06 season in order to play regular first team football. Despite his limited appearances, Arsenal manager Arsène Wenger had stated he had a future at Arsenal, despite being kept out of the side at the time by the form of Thierry Henry and Dennis Bergkamp. In the end, his time at Celtic was forgettable; he made just two substitute appearances for the club, one in each leg of their loss to Artmedia Bratislava in the Champions League. He accused Celtic manager Gordon Strachan of not giving him a chance.

==== Loan to West Ham United ====
On 24 August 2005, Aliadière decided to move back to London after a lack of first team opportunities, where West Ham United took over his year-long loan deal, having been promoted back to the Premier League after two seasons in the lower leagues. Once again affected by injury, he only made eight appearances for West Ham, seven as a substitute.

==== Loan to Wolverhampton Wanderers ====
On 31 January 2006, West Ham terminated the loan, and Aliadière joined Championship club Wolverhampton Wanderers on loan for the remainder of the 2005–06 season. He scored two league goals for Wolves, in games against Hull City and Watford.

==== Return to Arsenal ====
Aliadière returned to Arsenal during the 2006–07 season but was again mainly used in the League Cup, scoring both goals in their 2–0 win over West Brom on 24 October 2006. His first Premier League appearance of the season came on 16 December 2006, a 2–2 draw against Portsmouth, with Aliadière playing for 55 minutes before being replaced by Emmanuel Adebayor. Continuing appearances in Arsenal's League Cup campaign saw him score in the quarter-final against Liverpool in a 6–3 victory, and in the second leg of the semi-final against Tottenham Hotspur, with Arsenal advancing with a 3–1 win. Arsenal ultimately lost the final 2–1 to Chelsea, with Aliadière featuring for 80 minutes.

With four appearances in Premier League matches during the season, as of 9 January 2007 he had played 37 times for Arsenal, 25 as a substitute, scoring nine goals, all but one coming in the League Cup, four against West Brom. In the January 2007 transfer window, Aliadière was linked with a move to the Premier League club Middlesbrough in North East England, after Wenger said he would be allowed to leave the club. The move, however, failed to happen after Robin van Persie broke his foot, and he was told to stay at Arsenal for the time being. He made his final Arsenal appearance on the final day of the 2006–07 season against Portsmouth in a 0–0 draw at Fratton Park.

=== Middlesbrough ===
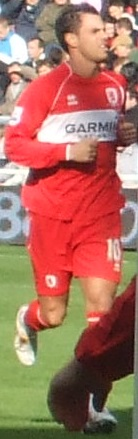
Aliadière playing for Middlesbrough in 2008

Middlesbrough signed Aliadière on 19 June 2007, for an initial fee of £2 million. He scored his first goal in a Premier League match against Manchester United at Old Trafford in October 2007, with a header to draw level at 1–1, before Middlesbrough went on to lose the game 4–1. This was his first Premier League goal, since scoring his first ever for Arsenal on 27 August 2002. He scored for Middlesbrough against old club Arsenal on 15 March in a 1–1 draw, before rounding off the season, scoring in the final day 8–1 victory over Manchester City on 11 May 2008.

Aliadière got a red card and three match ban for slapping Javier Mascherano in a 23 February 2008 Premier League match against Liverpool, after Mascherano had raised his hands against him, in full view of the referee. It was the cause of controversy after Middlesbrough's consequent appeal was deemed as "frivolous" by The Football Association (FA) and extended by one more game, with the club's chairman and chief executive, and Tottenham manager Harry Redknapp, deeming this unfair and criticising The FA, contrasting it with a recent appeal by Chelsea's Michael Essien.

Before the start of the 2008–09 season, Aliadière switched to wearing the number 10, previously worn by midfielder Fábio Rochemback, when his number 11 was given to £3.2 million summer signing Marvin Emnes. He scored his first goal of the season in Middlesbrough's 5–1 home victory against Yeovil Town on 26 August 2008. His first Premier League goal of the season came in a 1–0 win against Wigan Athletic at the JJB Stadium on 4 October 2008, scoring in the 89th minute of the match. After a run of not scoring in his next ten matches, he again scored against his old club Arsenal, with a headed equaliser in a home 1–1 draw on 13 December 2008. At the end of the season, Middlesbrough finished equal bottom of the Premier League with West Brom, on 32 points, and as a result were relegated to the Championship.

On 12 September 2009, he came off the bench against Ipswich Town to score two goals after 30 minutes of being on the pitch, and scored another goal in the same week against Sheffield Wednesday. His next goal came on 26 December against Scunthorpe United, in his first start under new manager Gordon Strachan due to injury. Having failed to reach the play-offs, and after three injury hit seasons at Middlesbrough, he left the club on 30 June 2010 at the end of his contract having decided not to take up the option of extending his contract. In total, he made 86 appearances and scored 12 goals for the club. The 2010–11 pre-season found Aliadière training with West Ham with a view to a permanent move to the London club. The deal fell through when he damaged his knee ligaments playing in a reserve game against Crystal Palace. Subsequently, his old club Middlesbrough offered the player full use of their rehabilitation and training facilities in order to overcome the injury and regain full fitness.

In January 2011, Aliadière also revealed he was linked with a move to Blackpool, but the move collapsed over contract issues; he described the experience as hitting "rock-bottom". Al Ain, a club based in the United Arab Emirates, announced on 13 February 2011 that they had signed Aliadière, but he subsequently denounced their claim, stating that he had rejected a move and Al Ain had "been very unprofessional in their conduct".

=== Post-Middlesbrough ===
In March 2011, Aliadière trained with former club Arsenal while looking for a club. Along with the newly re-signed goalkeeper Jens Lehmann he played the full 90 minutes in a reserve game against Wigan on 29 March 2011, losing the game 2–1.

=== Lorient ===
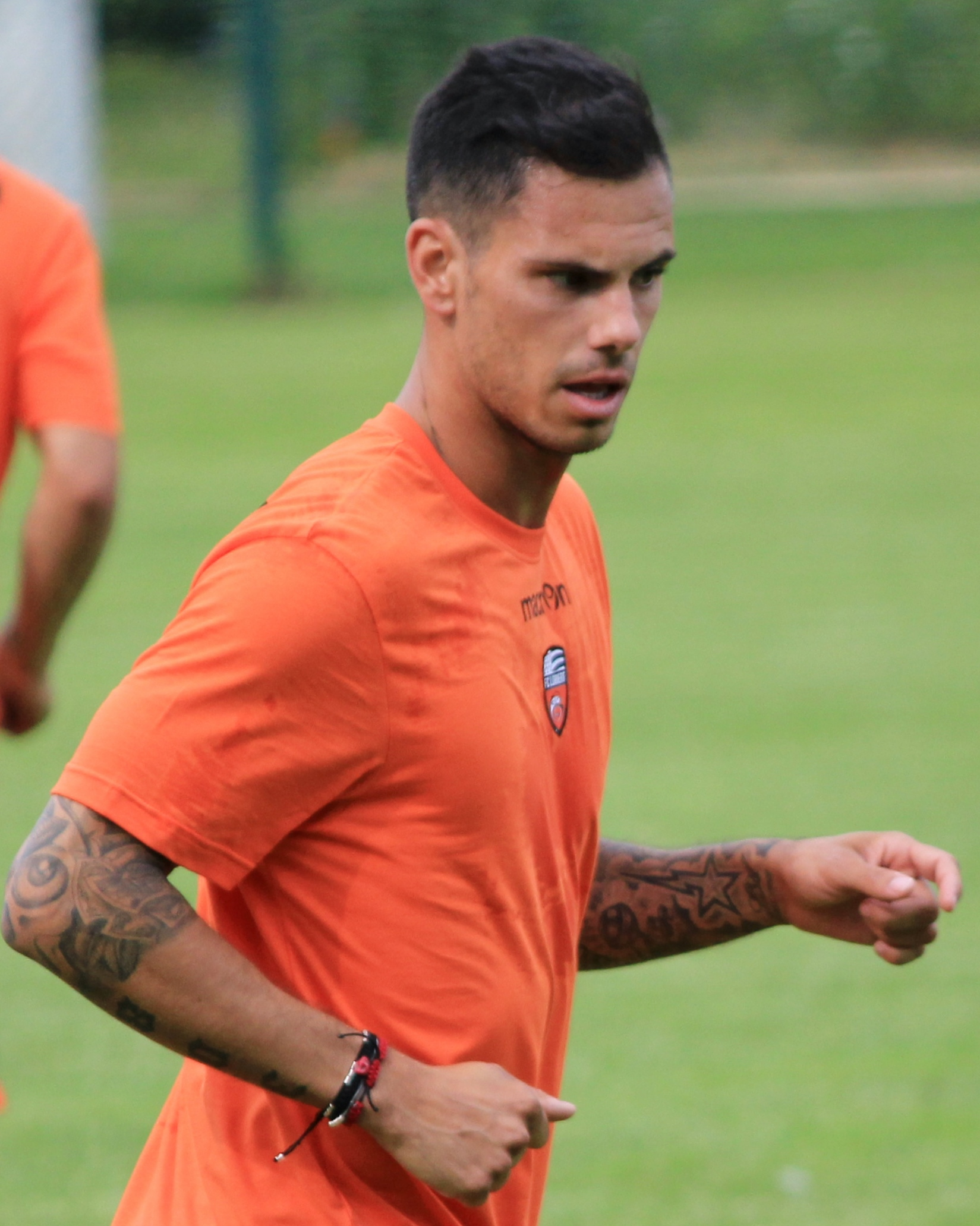
Aliadière training with Lorient in 2013

On 5 July 2011, Aliadière signed for Ligue 1 club Lorient on a free transfer, with an option for a three-year deal. It was revealed that Arsène Wenger helped Aliadiere seal his move to Lorient. He made his debut for Lorient in a 2–0 win against Valenciennes, then scored his first two goals in a 3–0 win over Saint-Étienne. On 18 October 2011, he agreed to a newly designed three-year deal with Lorient, which he officially signed on 1 November 2011.

In Lorient's 2–2 draw with Paris Saint-Germain to start the 2012–13 Ligue 1 season, Aliadière scored Lorient's second, putting them up 2–0 at the time. With his side down 4–1 at home to Ajaccio on 28 October 2012, he scored a second-half brace to help Lorient earn a point, as Gilles Sunu scored Lorient's fourth goal in the dying seconds. On 9 December, Aliadière opened the scoring against title contenders Marseille, striking from the penalty spot and also provided the assist for Kévin Monnet-Paquet's strike, as Lorient won comfortably 3–0 at the Stade Vélodrome.

On 12 December, Aliadière received the ball from a poor clearance by Sochaux goalkeeper Simon Pouplin and found Alain Traoré, who fizzed a long-range effort in off the left-hand post, giving Lorient a 1–0 lead; Lorient went on to win 2–0 and moved up to fourth in the Ligue 1 table. Lorient continued their ascent up the Ligue 1 table with a 2–0 defeat of Saint-Étienne on 16 December, Aliadière opening the scoring in the 20th minute after defeating two defenders and finishing past the goalkeeper. In the January transfer window, Aliadière was linked to a return move to England by joining Middlesbrough's rival Newcastle United, for personal reasons, but the move was rejected by the club. Eventually, he remained at the club throughout the transfer window and said that transfer speculation did not affect his form, and even hints to play for the France national team.

In Lorient's Brittany derby with Rennes on 2 February 2013, Aliadière scored the team's second goal in a 2–2 draw. Ahead of the match, Aliadière told Ligue 1.com when asked about comparing the derbies, "You can't really compare them to be honest. The derbies I played in the UK were Arsenal versus Spurs or even Middlesbrough against Sunderland or Newcastle. The derbies here are not as fanatical as those in England. It's obviously a big game and a game that the fans want to win but it won't be the end of the world for them if they don't. They are not as passionate as the people in the UK so it's not as big."

Aliadière converted a penalty to open the scoring in a 2–1 defeat of Evian on 16 February, keeping Lorient within reach of securing European football. Aliadière expressed his pleasure at playing for manager Christian Gourcuff, stating that "his vision of football ... means very good organization defensively".

=== Umm Salal ===
On 25 July 2014, it was announced that Aliadière had completed a transfer to Qatari side Umm Salal.

=== Lorient ===
In September 2016, Aliadère once again joined Lorient, signing on a free transfer. He left at the end of the 2016–17 season.

Aliadère retired from playing in 2018.

== International career ==
Aliadière made five appearances and scored one goal for the France national under-21 team.

== Personal life ==
Aliadière is of Swiss and Algerian descent and bears a tattoo with the flag of Algeria. Aliadière said that Arsenal manager Arsène Wenger, during his six-year spell at the Gunners, was like a father to him. They remain in contact to the present day.

== Career statistics ==
Appearances and goals by club, season and competition
Club	Season	League			Cup		Europe		Other		Total	
Club	Season	Division	Apps	Goals	Apps	Goals	Apps	Goals	Apps	Goals	Apps	Goals
Arsenal	2001–02	Premier League	1	0	2	0	0	0	–		3	0
Arsenal	2002–03	Premier League	3	1	0	0	0	0	–		3	1
Arsenal	2003–04	Premier League	10	0	4	4	1	0	–		15	4
Arsenal	2004–05	Premier League	4	0	2	0	0	0	1	0	7	0
Arsenal	2006–07	Premier League	11	0	10	4	2	0	–		23	4
Arsenal	Total		29	1	18	8	3	0	1	0	51	9
Celtic (loan)	2005–06	Scottish Premier League	0	0	0	0	2	0	–		2	0
West Ham United (loan)	2005–06	Premier League	7	0	1	0	0	0	–		8	0
Wolverhampton Wanderers (loan)	2005–06	Championship	14	2	0	0	—		–		14	2
Middlesbrough	2007–08	Premier League	29	5	2	0	0	0	–		31	5
Middlesbrough	2008–09	Premier League	29	2	5	1	0	0	–		34	3
Middlesbrough	2009–10	Championship	20	4	1	0	—		–		21	4
Middlesbrough	Total		78	11	8	1	0	0	0	0	86	12
Lorient	2011–12	Ligue 1	18	2	1	2	0	0	–		19	4
Lorient	2012–13	Ligue 1	31	15	5	4	0	0	–		36	19
Lorient	2013–14	Ligue 1	27	8	1	0	0	0	–		28	8
Lorient	Total		76	25	7	6	0	0	0	0	83	31
Umm Salal	2014–15	Qatar Stars League	24	6			0	0	–		24	6
Umm Salal	2015–16	Qatar Stars League	13	3			0	0	–		13	3
Umm Salal	Total		37	9			0	0	0	0	37	9
Lorient	2016–17	Ligue 1	13	1	3	1	0	0	1	0	17	2
Lorient B	2016–17	CFA	1	0	–		–		0	0	1	0
Career total			255	49	37	16	5	0	2	0	299	65

== Honours ==
Arsenal U18

- FA Youth Cup: 2000–01

Arsenal

- Premier League: 2003–04
- FA Community Shield: 2002, 2004
- Football League Cup runner-up: 2006–07

France U21

- Toulon Tournament: 2004

Individual

- FC Lorient Player of the Year: 2013
