= 2006–07 Football League Cup =

Carling Cup, League Cup

Tournament details
- Country: England; Wales
- Teams: 92

Final positions
- Champions: Chelsea (4th title)
- Runners-up: Arsenal

Tournament statistics
- Top goal scorer(s): Jermaine Easter; Júlio Baptista (6 goals)

The 2006–07 Football League Cup (known as the Carling Cup for sponsorship reasons) was the 47th staging of the Football League Cup, a knock-out competition for the top 92 football clubs played in English football league system. The competition name reflects a sponsorship deal with lager brand Carling.

The competition began in August 2006 and ended with the final on 25 February 2007. The Millennium Stadium in Cardiff hosted the final, as the reconstruction of Wembley Stadium could not be completed in time to host the final.

The winners were Chelsea, beating Arsenal in the final 2-1 after two goals by Didier Drogba.

== Format ==
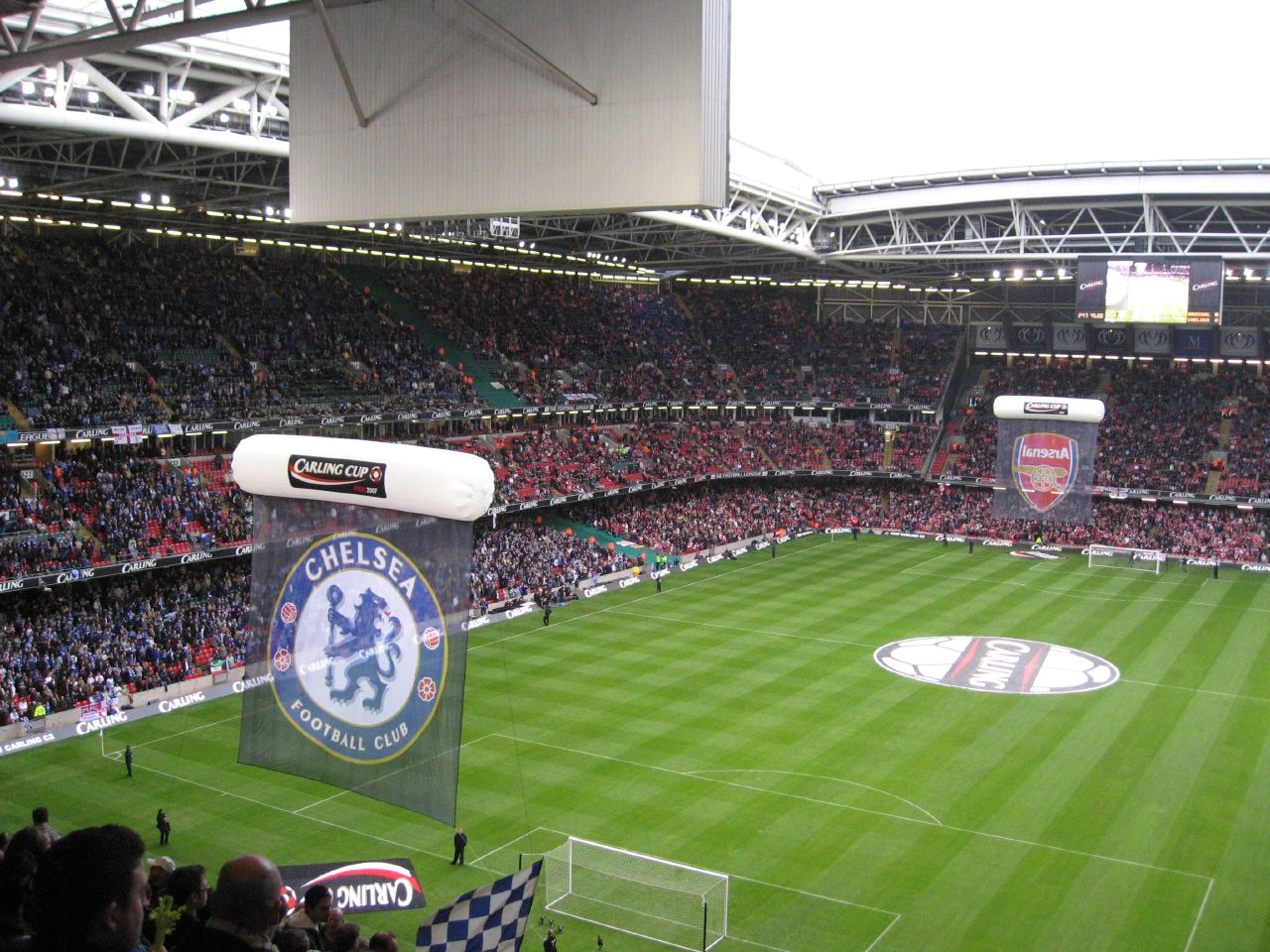
Pre-match presentation at the 2007 final between Chelsea and Arsenal at the Millennium Stadium in Cardiff

The competition consists of five single elimination rounds (taking place only on week-nights) before a two-legged semi-final and then a final match at a neutral venue. The venue for each fixture in round one to the finals will not be neutral. It will be the home ground of one of the two clubs in each fixture, and will be decided as part of the draw for each round.

There are no replays in the competition. If necessary, extra-time and penalties will decide each tie's winners on the night.

== First round ==
The 72 Football League clubs compete from the first round, which is divided into North and South sections. Each section is divided equally into a pot of seeded clubs and a pot of unseeded clubs. Clubs' rankings depend upon their finishing position in the 2005-06 season. Therefore, the clubs relegated from the Premier League in 2006; Sunderland (North), Birmingham City and West Bromwich Albion (South) are the top seeds, and the clubs newly promoted to the Football League — Accrington Stanley and Hereford United — are bottom seeds in north and south sections respectively.

- At 12:00 BST on 21 June 2006, seeded clubs and unseeded clubs were paired off to create the first round draw.
- The small numbers represent the seeding.
- Ties are shown in order of the draw.

North
Tie no	Home team	Score^{1}	Away team	Attendance
1	20 Chesterfield	0–0	Wolverhampton Wanderers 4	4,136
0–0 after extra time — Chesterfield win 6–5 on penalties
2	5 Stoke City	1–2	Darlington 28	3,573
3	19 Port Vale	2–1	Preston North End 2	3,522
4	7 Burnley	0–1	Hartlepool United 25	3,853
5	9 Sheffield Wednesday	1–4	Wrexham 29	8,047
6	34 Bury	2–0	Sunderland 1	2,930
7	8 Hull City	1–1	Tranmere Rovers 21	6,075
Hull City win 2–1 after extra time
8	22 Blackpool	1–1	Barnsley 11	3,938
2–2 after extra time — Barnsley win 4–2 on penalties
9	13 Huddersfield Town	0–2	Mansfield Town 32	5,111
10	24 Carlisle United	1–1	Bradford City 17	4,757
1–1 after extra time — Carlisle United win 4–3 on penalties
11	23 Rotherham United	3–1	Oldham Athletic 16	3,065
12	18 Scunthorpe United	2–2	Lincoln City 27	3,455
Scunthorpe United win 4–3 after extra time
13	36 Accrington Stanley	1–0	Nottingham Forest 14	2,146
14	26 Grimsby Town	0–3	Crewe Alexandra 12	1,635
15	3 Leeds United	1–0	Chester City 31	10,013
16	15 Doncaster Rovers	3–2	Rochdale 30	3,690
17	35 Stockport County	0–1	Derby County 10	3,394
18	6 Leicester City	2–0	Macclesfield Town 33	6,298

South
Tie no	Home team	Score^{1}	Away team	Attendance
1	7 Cardiff City	0–2	Barnet 33	3,305
2	25 Milton Keynes Dons	0–0	Colchester United 13	2,747
Milton Keynes Dons win 1–0 after extra time
3	26 Swindon Town	2–2	Brentford 16	5,582
2–2 after extra time — Brentford win 4–3 on penalties
4	3 Crystal Palace	1–2	Notts County 35	4,481
5	36 Hereford United	3–1	Coventry City 4	3,404
6	17 Swansea City	2–2	Wycombe Wanderers 28	5,892
Wycombe Wanderers win 3–2 after extra time
7	29 Peterborough United	1–1	Ipswich Town 10	4,729
2–2 after extra time — Peterborough United win 4–2 on penalties
8	21 AFC Bournemouth	1–3	Southend United 12	3,764
9	15 Brighton & Hove Albion	1–0	Boston United 31	2,533
10	24 Cheltenham Town	2–1	Bristol City 18	3,713
11	14 Millwall	2–1	Gillingham 19	5,040
12	8 Southampton	5–2	Yeovil Town 20	20,653
13	1 Birmingham City	1–0	Shrewsbury Town 30	12,428
14	9 Plymouth Argyle	0–1	Walsall 27	6,407
15	32 Bristol Rovers	1–1	Luton Town 6	2,882
1–1 after extra time — Luton Town win 5–3 on penalties
16	11 Queens Park Rangers	3–2	Northampton Town 22	4,569
17	34 Torquay United	0–2	Norwich City 5	3,100
18	23 Leyton Orient	0–3	West Bromwich Albion 2	3,058

^{1} Score after 90 minutes

== Second round ==
In Round 2, the 36 winners from Round 1 were joined by the 12 Premier League clubs not participating in European competitions. The draw took place on 26 August 2006 and matches were played during the week commencing 18 September.

Tie no	Home team	Score^{1}	Away team	Attendance
1	Leeds United	3–1	Barnet	7,220
2	Watford	0–0	Accrington Stanley	8,368
0–0 after extra time — Watford win 6–5 on penalties
3	Crewe Alexandra	2–0	Wigan Athletic	3,907
4	Doncaster Rovers	3–3	Derby County	5,598
3–3 after extra time — Doncaster Rovers win 8–7 on penalties
5	Sheffield United	1–0	Bury	6,273
6	Millwall	0–4	Southampton	5,492
7	West Bromwich Albion	3–1	Cheltenham Town	10,974
8	Peterborough United	1–2	Everton	10,756
9	Hereford United	1–3	Leicester City	4,073
10	Port Vale	3–2	Queens Park Rangers	3,550
11	Fulham	1–2	Wycombe Wanderers	6,620
12	Hull City	0–0	Hartlepool United	6,392
0–0 after extra time — Hull City win 3–2 on penalties
13	Walsall	1–3	Bolton Wanderers	6,243
14	Middlesbrough	0–1	Notts County	11,148
15	Charlton Athletic	1–0	Carlisle United	8,190
16	Barnsley	1–2	Milton Keynes Dons	4,411
17	Chesterfield	2–1	Manchester City	7,960
18	Scunthorpe United	1–2	Aston Villa	6,502
19	Southend United	3–2	Brighton & Hove Albion	4,819
20	Brentford	0–3	Luton Town	3,005
21	Reading	3–3	Darlington	10,353
3–3 after extra time — Reading win 4–2 on penalties
22	Birmingham City	1–1	Wrexham	10,491
Birmingham City win 4–1 after extra time
23	Rotherham United	2–4	Norwich City	3,958
24	Mansfield Town	1–2	Portsmouth	6,646

^{1} Score after 90 minutes

== Third round ==
Round 3 was drawn on 23 September from the 24 remaining clubs and the eight Premier League clubs in European competitions. The ties were played the week of 23 October:

Tie no	Home team	Score^{1}	Away team	Attendance
1	Wycombe Wanderers	1–1	Doncaster Rovers	3,308
2–2 after extra time — Wycombe win 3–2 on penalties
2	Sheffield United	2–4	Birmingham City	10,584
3	Leicester City	2–2	Aston Villa	27,288
Aston Villa win 3–2 after extra time
4	Watford	2–1	Hull City	8,274
5	Leeds United	1–3	Southend United	10,449
6	Chesterfield	2–1	West Ham United	7,787
7	Notts County	2–0	Southampton	6,731
8	Newcastle United	3–0	Portsmouth	25,028
9	Charlton Athletic	1–0	Bolton Wanderers	10,788
10	Liverpool	4–3	Reading	42,445
11	West Bromwich Albion	0–2	Arsenal	21,566
12	Port Vale	0–0	Norwich City	4,518
0–0 after extra time — Port Vale win 3–2 on penalties
13	Everton	4–0	Luton Town	27,149
14	Milton Keynes Dons	0–5	Tottenham Hotspur	8,306
15	Crewe Alexandra	1–1	Manchester United	10,046
Manchester United win 2–1 after extra time
16	Blackburn Rovers	0–2	Chelsea	14,732

^{1} Score after 90 minutes

== Fourth round ==
The Fourth round draw was made on 25 October 2006.

2006-11-08

Birmingham City	0–1	Liverpool
	Report	Agger 45'

St Andrew's, Birmingham
Attendance: 23,061
Referee: Howard Webb (Sheffield & Hallamshire)

2006-11-08

Chelsea	4–0	Aston Villa
Lampard 32'; Shevchenko 65'; Essien 82'; Drogba 84'	Report

Stamford Bridge, London
Attendance: 41,516
Referee: Mark Halsey (Lancashire)

2006-11-07

Chesterfield	3–3 (a.e.t.)	Charlton Athletic
Larkin 2'; Folan 47'; Allison 120'	Report	Hasselbaink 40', 93'; Bent 73'
Penalties
	3–4

Saltergate, Chesterfield
Attendance: 7,000
Referee: Mike Riley (West Yorkshire)

2006-11-08

Everton	0–1	Arsenal
	Report	Adebayor 85'

Goodison Park, Liverpool
Referee: Graham Poll (Hertfordshire)

2006-11-07

Notts County	0–1	Wycombe Wanderers
	Report	Easter 49'

Meadow Lane, Nottingham
Attendance: 7,395
Referee: Nigel Miller (County Durham)

2006-11-07

Southend United	1–0	Manchester United
Eastwood 27'	Report

Roots Hall, Southend-on-Sea
Attendance: 11,532
Referee: Uriah Rennie (Sheffield & Hallamshire)

2006-11-08

Tottenham Hotspur	3–1 (a.e.t.)	Port Vale
Huddlestone 80', 99'; Defoe 107'	Report	Constantine 64'

White Hart Lane, London
Attendance: 34,560
Referee: Steve Bennett (Kent)

2006-11-07

Watford	2–2 (a.e.t.)	Newcastle United
Francis 69'; Shittu 108'	Report	Sibierski 3'; Parker 116'
Penalties
	4–5

Vicarage Road, Watford
Attendance: 16,791
Referee: Lee Mason (Lancashire)

== Quarter-finals ==
The quarter-final draw was made on 11 November 2006 at 12:00 GMT.

2006-12-19

Charlton Athletic	0–1	Wycombe Wanderers
	Report	Easter 35'

The Valley, London
Attendance: 18,940
Referee: Mark Clattenburg (County Durham)

2007-01-09

Liverpool	3–6	Arsenal
Fowler 33'; Gerrard 68'; Hyypiä 80'	Report	Aliadière 27'; Baptista 40', 45+6', 60', 84'; Song 45+2'

Anfield, Liverpool
Attendance: 42,614
Referee: Martin Atkinson (West Yorkshire)

2006-12-20

Newcastle United	0–1	Chelsea
	Report	Drogba 79'

St James' Park, Newcastle upon Tyne
Attendance: 37,406
Referee: Chris Foy (Merseyside)

2006-12-20

Tottenham Hotspur	1–0 (a.e.t.)	Southend United
Defoe 115'	Report

White Hart Lane, London
Attendance: 35,811
Referee: Phil Dowd (Staffordshire)

== Semi-finals ==
The semi-final draw was made on 23 December 2006 at 12:00 GMT. Unlike the other rounds, the semi-final ties were played over two legs, with each team playing one leg at home.

=== First leg ===
2007-01-10

Wycombe Wanderers	1–1	Chelsea
Easter 77'	Report	Bridge 36'

Adams Park, High Wycombe
Attendance: 9,771
Referee: Steve Bennett (Kent)

2007-01-24

Tottenham Hotspur	2–2	Arsenal
Berbatov 12'; Baptista 20' (o.g.)	Report	Baptista 64', 77'

White Hart Lane, London
Attendance: 35,485
Referee: Graham Poll (Hertfordshire)

=== Second leg ===
2007-01-23

Chelsea	4–0	Wycombe Wanderers
Shevchenko 22', 43'; Lampard 69', 90'	Report

Stamford Bridge, London
Attendance: 41,591
Referee: Mike Dean (Cheshire)

Chelsea won 5–1 on aggregate.

2007-01-31

Arsenal	3–1 (a.e.t.)	Tottenham Hotspur
Adebayor 77'; Aliadière 105'; Chimbonda 113' (o.g.)	Report	Mido 85'

Emirates Stadium, London
Attendance: 59,872
Referee: Alan Wiley (Staffordshire)

Arsenal won 5–3 on aggregate.

== Final ==
2007-02-25
15:00

Arsenal	1–2	Chelsea
Walcott 12'	(Report)	Drogba 20', 84'

Millennium Stadium, Cardiff
Attendance: 70,073
Referee: Howard Webb (Sheffield & Hallamshire)

== See also ==
- Football League Cup
