= 2003–04 Football League Cup =

Carling Cup, League Cup

Tournament details
- Country: England; Wales
- Teams: 92

Final positions
- Champions: Middlesbrough (1st title)
- Runners-up: Bolton Wanderers

Tournament statistics
- Matches played: 93
- Top goal scorer(s): Juan Pablo Ángel (7 goals)

The 2003–04 Football League Cup (known as the Carling Cup for sponsorship reasons) was the 44th staging of the Football League Cup, a knockout competition for England's top 92 football clubs. The competition name reflects a sponsorship deal with lager brand Carling.

The competition began in August 2003 and ended with the final on 29 February 2004. The Millennium Stadium in Cardiff hosted the final match, as it had done since 2001 as the reconstruction was still taking place on Wembley Stadium in London.

The winners were Middlesbrough who beat Bolton Wanderers in the final 2–1 and collected their first major piece of silverware in their history and as a result of their victory qualified for European football for the first time. Joseph Desire-Job gave Middlesbrough the lead with just 2 minutes gone and a Bolo Zenden penalty five minutes later doubled their advantage. Kevin Davies pulled a goal back in the 21st minute but Middlesbrough held on. It was to be until 2008 when another English manager won a domestic tournament when Harry Redknapp (then at Portsmouth F.C.) lifted the FA Cup.

== First round ==
North
Tie no	Home team	Score^{1}	Away team	Attendance
1	Barnsley (3)	1–2	Blackpool (3)	5,378
2	Bradford (2)	0–0	Darlington (4)	4,077
0 – 0 after extra time — Darlington win 5 – 3 on penalties
3	Chesterfield (3)	0–0	Burnley (2)	2,928
0 – 0 after extra time — Burnley win 3 – 2 on penalties
4	Crewe (2)	2–0	Wrexham (3)	3,152
5	Doncaster Rovers (4)	3–2	Grimsby Town (3)	6,057
6	Huddersfield Town (4)	2–1	Derby County (2)	6,672
7	Lincoln City (4)	0–1	Stockport County (3)	2,296
8	Macclesfield Town (4)	1–2	Sheffield United (2)	2,764
9	Port Vale (3)	0–0	Nottingham Forest (2)	4,950
0 – 0 after extra time — Nottingham Forest win 3 – 2 on penalties
10	Preston North End (2)	0–0	Notts County (3)	5,016
0 – 0 after extra time — Notts County win 7 – 6 on penalties
11	Rotherham United (2)	2–1	York City (4)	2,919
12	Scunthorpe United (4)	2–1	Oldham Athletic (3)	2,366
13	Tranmere Rovers (3)	1–0	Bury (4)	4,272
14	Walsall (2)	2–1	Carlisle United (4)	4,665
15	Wigan Athletic (2)	2–0	Hull City (4)	3,295
16	Mansfield Town (4)	1–2	Sunderland (2)	
17	Sheffield Wednesday (3)	1–1	Hartlepool United (3)	13,410
2 – 2 after extra time, Hartlepool win 5 – 4 on penalties
18	Stoke City (2)	2–1	Rochdale (4)	4,678

South
Tie no	Home team	Score^{1}	Away team	Attendance
1	Bristol Rovers (4)	0–1	Brighton & Hove Albion (3)	5,518
2	Cambridge United (4)	1–2	Gillingham (2)	3,044
3	Cardiff (2)	4–1	Leyton Orient (4)	4,503
4	Cheltenham (4)	1–2	QPR (3)	3,697
5	Colchester (3)	2–1	Plymouth (3)	2,367
6	Luton Town (3)	4–1	Yeovil Town (4)	4,337
7	Millwall (2)	0–1	Oxford United (4)	4,781
8	Northampton Town (4)	1–0	Norwich City (2)	5,476
9	Southend United (4)	2–3	Swindon Town (3)	3,385
10	Torquay United (4)	1–1	Crystal Palace (2)	3,366
1 – 1 after extra time — Crystal Palace win 3 – 1 on penalties
11	Watford (2)	0–0	Bournemouth (3)	9,561
Watford win 1 – 0 after extra time
12	West Bromwich Albion (2)	4–0	Brentford (3)	10,440
13	Wycombe Wanderers (3)	2–0	Wimbledon (2)	1,986
14	Boston United (4)	1–3	Reading (2)	2,055
15	Bristol City (3)	1–1	Swansea City (4)	5,807
Bristol City win 4 – 1 after extra time
16	Coventry City (2)	2–0	Peterborough United (3)	8,280
17	Ipswich Town (2)	0–0	Kidderminster Harriers (4)	11,118
Ipswich win 1 – 0 after extra time
18	West Ham (2)	3–1	Rushden & Diamonds (3)	13,715

^{1} Score after 90 minutes

== Second round ==
The 36 winners from the First Round joined 12 of the 20 Premier League clubs not participating in the UEFA Champions League in Round Two.

- The draw was made on 16 August 2003.
- Matches occurred during the week commencing 22 August.
- Extra time played when the scores were level after 90 minutes.

Tie no	Home team	Score^{1}	Away team	Attendance
1	Blackpool	1–0	Birmingham City	7,370
2	Bristol City	0–0	Watford	5,213
Bristol City win 1 – 0 after extra time
3	Cardiff City	2–3	West Ham	10,724
4	Charlton Athletic	3–3	Luton Town	10,905
4 – 4 after extra time – Charlton Athletic win 8 – 7 on penalties
5	Crystal Palace	2–1	Doncaster Rovers	4,904
6	Hartlepool United	1–2	West Bromwich Albion	5,265
7	Leicester City	1–0	Crewe Alexandra	27,675
8	Notts County	2–1	Ipswich Town	4,059
9	Portsmouth	5–2	Northampton Town	11,130
10	Rotherham United	1–0	Colchester United	2,474
11	Scunthorpe United	2–3	Burnley	2,915
12	Sheffield United	0–2	QPR	9,578
13	Stoke City	0–2	Gillingham	4,607
14	Sunderland	2–4	Huddersfield Town	13,516
15	Tranmere Rovers	0–0	Nottingham Forest	4,477
0 – 0 after extra time – Nottingham Forest win 4 – 1 on penalties
16	Wigan Athletic	1–0	Fulham	4,874
17	Wolverhampton Wanderers	2–0	Darlington	10,232
18	Wycombe Wanderers	0–5	Aston Villa	6,072
19	Bolton Wanderers	3–1	Walsall	5,229
20	Coventry City	0–3	Tottenham Hotspur	15,474
21	Everton	3–0	Stockport County	19,807
22	Leeds United	2–2	Swindon Town	29,211
2 – 2 after extra time – Leeds United win 4 – 3 on penalties
23	Middlesbrough	0–0	Brighton & Hove Albion	10,435
Middlesbrough win 1 – 0 after extra time
24	Oxford United	1–3	Reading	9,870

^{1} Score after 90 minutes

== Third round ==
Manchester United, Arsenal, Chelsea, Newcastle United, Liverpool, Southampton, Blackburn Rovers and Manchester City joined the 24 winners from the Second Round. Matches were played on the week commencing 27 October 2003

Tie no	Home team	Score^{1}	Away team	Attendance
1	Aston Villa	1–0	Leicester City	26,729
2	Blackburn Rovers	3–4	Liverpool	16,918
3	Chelsea	4–2	Notts County	35,997
4	Everton	1–0	Charlton Athletic	24,863
5	Newcastle United	1–1	West Bromwich Albion	46,932
West Bromwich Albion win 2 – 1 after extra time
6	Nottingham Forest	2–4	Portsmouth	20,078
7	Tottenham Hotspur	0–0	West Ham	
Tottenham Hotspur win 1 – 0 after extra time
8	Wigan Athletic	1–2	Middlesbrough	8,046
9	Arsenal	1–1	Rotherham United	27,451
1 – 1 after extra time – Arsenal win 9 – 8 on penalties
10	Blackpool	1–3	Crystal Palace	6,010
11	Bolton Wanderers	2–1	Gillingham	5,258
12	Bristol City	1–3	Southampton	17,408
13	Leeds United	1–1	Manchester United	37,546
Manchester United win 3 – 2 after extra time
14	QPR	0–3	Manchester City	16,773
15	Reading	1–0	Huddersfield Town	11,892
16	Wolverhampton Wanderers	2–0	Burnley	18,548

^{1} Score after 90 minutes

== Fourth round ==
- The draw was made on 30 November 2003.
- Matches were played in the week commencing 1 December.
- Extra time played when scores level at 90 minutes.
2003-12-03

Aston Villa	3–0	Crystal Palace
Symons 22' (o.g.); McCann 70'; Ángel 79'

Villa Park, Birmingham
Attendance: 24,258
Referee: Mike Dean

2003-12-03

Liverpool	2–3	Bolton Wanderers
Murphy 66'; Šmicer 88'		Jardel 4'; Okocha 79'; Djorkaeff 90' (pen.)

Anfield, Liverpool
Attendance: 33,185
Referee: Mike Riley

2003-12-03

Middlesbrough	0–0 (a.e.t.)	Everton
Penalties
	5–4

Riverside Stadium, Middlesbrough
Attendance: 18,568
Referee: Mark Halsey

2003-12-03

Reading	0–1	Chelsea
		Hasselbaink 57'

Madejski Stadium, Reading
Attendance: 24,107
Referee: Steve Bennett

2003-12-03

Tottenham Hotspur	3–1	Manchester City
Anderton 9'; Postiga 30'; Kanouté 90'		Fowler 80'

White Hart Lane, London
Attendance: 31,727
Referee: Paul Durkin

2003-12-03

West Bromwich Albion	2–0	Manchester United
Haas 6'; Dobie 56'

The Hawthorns, West Bromwich
Attendance: 25,282
Referee: Jeff Winter

2003-12-02

Arsenal	5–1	Wolverhampton Wanderers
Aliadière 24', 71'; Kanu 68'; Wiltord 79'; Fàbregas 88'		Rae 81'

Highbury, London
Attendance: 28,161
Referee: Dermot Gallagher

2003-12-02

Southampton	2–0	Portsmouth
Beattie 33', 90'

St. Mary's Stadium, Southampton
Attendance: 29,201
Referee: Graham Poll

== Quarter-finals ==
The draw for the quarter-finals was made on 6 December 2003. Matches were played in the week beginning 15 December 2003. The only team from outside the Premier League competing in this round was West Bromwich Albion, who lost 2–0 to Arsenal.

2003-12-16
20:00

West Bromwich Albion	0–2	Arsenal
		Kanu 25'; Aliadière 57'

The Hawthorns, West Bromwich
Attendance: 20,369
Referee: Matt Messias

2003-12-16
20:00

Bolton Wanderers	1–0 (a.e.t.)	Southampton
Pedersen 115'

Reebok Stadium, Bolton
Attendance: 13,957
Referee: Phil Dowd

2003-12-17
19:45

Tottenham Hotspur	1–1 (a.e.t.)	Middlesbrough
Anderton 2'		M. Ricketts 86'
Penalties
	4–5

White Hart Lane, London
Attendance: 25,307
Referee: Mike Dean

2003-12-17
19:45

Aston Villa	2–1	Chelsea
Ángel 16'; McCann 78'		J. Cole 69'

Villa Park, Birmingham
Attendance: 30,414
Referee: Neale Barry

== Semi-finals ==
The semi-final draw was made on 20 December 2003 Unlike the other rounds, the semi-final ties were played over two legs, with each team playing one leg at home. The ties were played in the weeks beginning 19 January and 26 January 2004, however the second leg of Middlesbrough v Arsenal was not played until 3 February 2004.

=== First leg ===
2004-01-20

Arsenal	0–1	Middlesbrough
		Juninho 53'

Highbury Stadium, London
Attendance: 31,070
Referee: Steve Dunn

2004-01-21

Bolton Wanderers	5–2	Aston Villa
Okocha 2', 80'; Nolan 9'; Giannakopoulos 17'; Ngotty 74'		Ángel 20', 56'

Reebok Stadium, Bolton
Attendance: 16,302
Referee: Paul Durkin

=== Second leg ===
2004-01-27

Aston Villa	2–0	Bolton Wanderers
Hitzlsperger 10'; Samuel 88'

Villa Park, Birmingham
Attendance: 36,883
Referee: Steve Bennett

Bolton Wanderers won 5–4 on aggregate.

2004-02-03

Middlesbrough	2–1	Arsenal
Zenden 69'; Reyes 85' (o.g.)		Edu 77'

Riverside Stadium, Middlesbrough
Attendance: 28,781
Referee: Dermot Gallagher

Middlesbrough won 3–1 on aggregate.

== Final ==
The 2004 Carling Cup Final was played on 29 February 2004 at the Millennium Stadium, Cardiff. It was contested by Bolton Wanderers and Middlesbrough. Middlesbrough won the match 2–1 and in doing so collected their first major piece of silverware in their history and qualified for the European football in the UEFA Cup for the first time.

2004-02-29
14:00

Bolton Wanderers	1–2	Middlesbrough
Davies 21'	Report	Job 2'; Zenden 7' (pen.)

Millennium Stadium, Cardiff
Attendance: 72,634
Referee: Mike Riley (West Yorkshire)

== See also ==
- Football League Cup
