= Jamal Easter =

Welsh footballer (born 1987)

Personal information
- Full name: Derwain Jamal Easter
- Date of birth: 15 November 1987 (age 38)
- Place of birth: Cardiff, Wales
- Position: Striker

Senior career*
Years	Team	Apps	(Gls)
2006–2007	Cardiff City	0	(0)
2006	→ Bristol Rovers (loan)	3	(0)
2007	→ Torquay United (loan)	10	(0)
2007–2008	Carmarthen Town	29	(9)
2008	Newport County	5	(1)
2008–2009	Carmarthen Town	10	(2)
2009	→ Clevedon Town (loan)	16	(5)
2009–2010	Clevedon Town	9	(2)
2010–2011	Taffs Well	18	(8)
2011–????	Bridgend Town	16	(10)
- Rhoose
2017–????	Pontypridd Town		

International career
2003–2004	Wales U17	5	(3)
2005	Wales U19	2	(0)
2006	Wales U21	1	(0)
- * Club domestic league appearances and goals

Derwain Jamal Easter (born 15 November 1987) is a Welsh former footballer who was a Wales Under-21 international.

== Career ==
Easter was born in Cardiff and joined Cardiff City as a trainee, turning professional in August 2006. On 27 October 2006, he joined Bristol Rovers on loan, where he played in three league games without scoring and one Football League Trophy game, where he scored one goal against his brother Jermaine's team, Wycombe Wanderers.

On 4 January 2007, he joined Torquay United on loan, signing at the same time as his Cardiff teammate Nick McKoy. He made his Torquay debut two days later as a second-half substitute for Matt Hockley in the 2–0 defeat at home to Southampton in the FA Cup Third Round. He was a regular in the Torquay side, but failed to impress the new managerial team of Keith Curle and Colin Lee, and returned to Cardiff at the end of his loan spell on 3 March 2007. He was released by Cardiff in May 2007.

Easter returned to Torquay United on trial in July 2007, playing the second half of the pre-season friendly against Newton Abbot. He signed for Carmarthen Town in August 2007, making 29 appearances in his first season but decided to leave the club at the end of the year. After an unsuccessful trial at Salisbury City, he signed for Newport County on 2 August 2008 following County's friendly with a Leeds United XI. Despite being involved in the first team during the opening month of the season, he was released by Newport on 31 August, returning to Carmarthen Town.

In February 2009, Easter signed on loan at Southern Football League Premier Division side Clevedon Town for the remainder of the season, scoring after two minutes on his debut in a 3–1 defeat to Banbury United. At the end of the season he signed with the club on a permanent basis. However a number of injuries restricted his playing time at the club, leading manager Nicky Tucker to propose a cut in wages which was rejected by Easter, resulting in his release in January 2010. After his release in England, he returned to Wales and signed for the 2010–11 season with Taff's Well of the Welsh First Division. In July 2011 signed for Bridgend Town and was the topscorer with Danny Thomas.

In July 2017 he joined Pontypridd Town, having also played for Rhoose.
