= David King (footballer, born 1990) =

English footballer

Personal information
- Full name: David Philip King
- Date of birth: 3 September 1990 (age 36)
- Place of birth: Milton Keynes, England
- Height: 6 ft 1 in (1.85 m)
- Position: Midfielder

Team information
- Current team: Hemel Hempstead Town

Youth career
- ?–2008: Milton Keynes Dons

Senior career*
Years	Team	Apps	(Gls)
2008–2010	Milton Keynes Dons	0	(0)
2009	→ Forest Green Rovers (loan)	4	(0)
2010–2012	Boreham Wood	28	(1)
2012–2015	Hemel Hempstead Town	34	(3)
2015–2016	Oxford City	19	(0)
2016–	Hemel Hempstead Town		
- * Club domestic league appearances and goals as of 01:02, 11 March 2016 (UTC)

David Philip King (born 3 September 1990) is an English footballer who plays for Oxford City as a midfielder.

== Career ==
King made his debut for MK Dons, coming on as a substitute in the 2–1 defeat to Cardiff City in the League Cup on 26 August 2008.

In October 2009, King joined Conference National side Forest Green Rovers on a one-month loan. He made his debut for Forest Green on 3 October 2009 as a substitute on 77 minutes in a 1–0 away defeat against Mansfield Town. King's loan spell was terminated in December 2009. Along with three other players, he was released by MK Dons at the end of his contract on 30 June 2010. He then signed for Boreham Wood.

In July 2012, it was announced that King had signed for Southern Premier Division side Hemel Hempstead Town.

In September 2015, Southern Premier Division side Oxford City FC announced the signing of King with a number of other clubs looking in to him.

King suffered an shoulder injury during 2015 leaving him out for about 2 months. Many football league clubs were interested in King.
