= Stuart Searle =

English footballer and manager

Personal information
- Full name: Stuart Andrew Searle
- Date of birth: 27 February 1979 (age 47)
- Place of birth: Wimbledon, England
- Position: Goalkeeper

Team information
- Current team: United States women's national soccer team (goalkeeping coach)

Senior career*
Years	Team	Apps	(Gls)
1996–1998	Woking		
1998–1999	Crawley Town		
1999–2001	Aldershot Town	20	(0)
2000	→ Molesey (loan)		
2001	→ Molesey (loan)		
2001	→ Carshalton Athletic (loan)		
2001–2005	Carshalton Athletic	73	(0)
2005–2007	Basingstoke Town	81	(0)
2007–2009	Chelsea	0	(0)
2008	→ Carshalton Athletic (loan)		
2009	Watford	0	(0)
2009–2011	Milton Keynes Dons	6	(0)
2011–2013	Chelmsford City	64	(0)
2013–2015	Metropolitan Police	33	(0)
Total		277	(0)

Managerial career
- 2004–2007: Chelsea Academy (goalkeeping coach)
- 2007–2009: Chelsea Reserves (player-coach)
- 2008–2016: Metropolitan Police U18
- 2011–2015: Chelsea Academy (goalkeeping coach)
- 2015: Guildford City (assistant)
- 2012–2024: Chelsea Women (goalkeeping coach)
- 2024–: United States (goalkeeping coach)
- * Club domestic league appearances and goals as of 21:29, 8 August 2015 (UTC)

Stuart Andrew Searle (born 27 February 1979) is an English football manager and former player who played as a goalkeeper. He is currently the goalkeeping coach of United States women's national soccer team.

== Club career ==
Born in Wimbledon, London, Searle joined Premier League team Chelsea from Basingstoke Town as back-up for their reserve team and as a player-coach, before working there part-time.

He moved to Championship team Watford in January 2009, which re-united him with former Chelsea reserve team manager Brendan Rodgers, who had been appointed as Watford manager in November 2008. In July 2009 his contract at Watford was cancelled by mutual consent and he subsequently signed a two-year contract with League One team Milton Keynes Dons.

Stuart made his long-awaited Football League debut in 2010 against Bristol Rovers at the Memorial Stadium. He remained at MK Dons in 2010–11, making a start against Yeovil Town in a 3–2 win. However, after MK Dons' loss to Peterborough in the N-Power League play-off semi-final he was released along with three other players.

== Management career ==
While still a player, Searle began coaching in various roles at Chelsea, including a two-year stint as player-coach for Chelsea Reserves.

After retiring from playing, Searle joined Guildford City as assistant manager in 2015.

2012–2024, Searle was the goalkeeping coach at Chelsea Women.

Since 2024, Searle is the goalkeeping coach with the United States women's national soccer team.
