= Steve Williams (footballer, born 1983) =

English footballer

Personal information
- Full name: Steven Williams
- Date of birth: 21 April 1983 (age 43)
- Place of birth: Oxford, England
- Position: Goalkeeper

Team information
- Current team: Evesham United
- Number: 1

Senior career*
Years	Team	Apps	(Gls)
2001–2007	Wycombe Wanderers	21	(0)
2002	→ Beaconsfield SYCOB (loan)		(0)
2006–2007	→ Forest Green Rovers (loan)	25	(0)
2007–2008	Lewes	33	(0)
2008–2009	Hayes & Yeading United	?	(0)
2009	Farnborough	?	(0)
2009–2011	Hastings United	?	(0)
	Maidenhead United	?	(0)
2011–	Evesham United	0	(0)
- * Club domestic league appearances and goals as of 02:02, 30 December 2009 (UTC)

Steve Williams (born 21 April 1983) is an English professional footballer formerly of Wycombe Wanderers in Football League Two. Williams joined the club aged 14 after having trials at Chelsea. He is currently with Southern League Premier Division side Evesham United.

He served a work experience spell at Beaconsfield SYCOB in 2002 due to limited opportunities with the Blues, starting the 2002–03 campaign as third choice behind Martin Taylor and Mark Osborn, signed his first professional contract in April 2002. He made his league début against Stockport County on 9 August 2003, after having a successful pre-season campaign ahead of first choice Frank Talia. Despite being in and out of the side throughout the 2003–04 season, Williams steadily improved and was unfortunate to fracture a finger at Plymouth Argyle in early April, missing the rest of that season.

Fit again for the start of the 2005–06 campaign, Williams never really came close to challenging Frank Talia for the number one spot and both had to see loan goalkeepers brought in ahead of them. However, Williams' first start of the season came against Peterborough United in the last game of the 2005–06 season which was enough to see him keep his place for the play-off games against Cheltenham Town.

Williams signed a new one-year contract with Wycombe on 1 August 2006, but just a day later moved to Forest Green Rovers on a season-long loan deal. He returned to Wycombe in January from his loan deal at Forest Green when it was cut short. He was then loaned out to Conference South side Lewes.

He was released by Wycombe at the end of the 2006–07 season. The 2007–08 season saw him win the Conference South club with Lewes.

In October 2011, Williams signed for Evesham United.
