= Jermaine Easter =

Welsh footballer (born 1982)

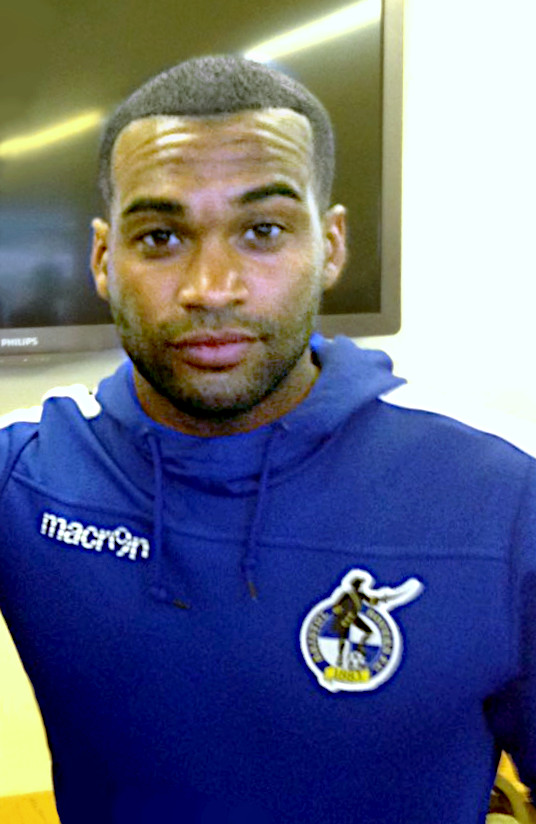
- Easter at Bristol Rovers in 2016

Personal information
- Full name: Jermaine Maurice Easter
- Date of birth: 15 January 1982 (age 44)
- Place of birth: Cardiff, Wales
- Height: 1.77 m (5 ft 9 1/2 in)
- Position: Forward

Youth career
- 1999–2001: Wolverhampton Wanderers

Senior career*
Years	Team	Apps	(Gls)
2001–2004	Hartlepool United	27	(2)
2004	→ Cambridge United (loan)	15	(2)
2004–2005	Cambridge United	24	(6)
2005	Boston United	9	(3)
2005–2006	Stockport County	19	(8)
2006–2008	Wycombe Wanderers	59	(21)
2007–2008	→ Plymouth Argyle (loan)	14	(2)
2008–2009	Plymouth Argyle	22	(4)
2008	→ Millwall (loan)	5	(1)
2008	→ Colchester United (loan)	5	(2)
2009–2011	Milton Keynes Dons	50	(14)
2010–2011	→ Swansea City (loan)	6	(1)
2011–2013	Crystal Palace	55	(8)
2013	→ Millwall (loan)	9	(1)
2013–2015	Millwall	29	(4)
2015–2017	Bristol Rovers	68	(12)
Total		416	(91)

International career
2007–2014	Wales	12	(0)
- * Club domestic league appearances and goals

Jermaine Maurice Easter (born 15 January 1982 in Cardiff) is a former Welsh international footballer who played as a striker. He is currently a football agent.

== Club career ==
Easter started his career as a trainee at Wolverhampton Wanderers, before being released, and joining Hartlepool in March 2001.

In May 2003, Easter, still yet to start a first-team game for Hartlepool, signed a new two-year contract.

In February 2004, Easter joined Cambridge United on loan, following a short trial, for 2 months. This was later extended to a third and final month. On his return to Hartlepool, Easter had the final year of his contract cancelled by mutual consent, and promptly rejoined Cambridge, on a one-year contract.

In March 2005, Easter was allowed to leave Cambridge early, and join Boston United on a free transfer. He signed a short contract, running until the end of the season.

Easter chose not to extend his stay with Boston, instead signing for Stockport County, where he joined up with his former manager at Hartlepool; Chris Turner.

=== Wycombe Wanderers ===
Easter joined Wycombe on 31 January 2006 from Stockport, signing a two-and-a-half-year deal. Earlier in the month, Easter had turned down moves to Oxford United and failed to reach an agreement of terms with manager Gary Johnson when meeting with Bristol City.

Easter made ten starting appearances and one substitute appearance for Wycombe in the remainder of the 2005–06 season. He managed only two goals, possibly being overshadowed by star striker Tommy Mooney.

The striker claimed his first league hat-trick in the 2006–07 season against Bury, on 19 August. It is the fastest league hat-trick scored by a Wycombe player, timed at 22 minutes, beating Nathan Tyson's 25-minute hat-trick against Lincoln City in 2004.

He scored the only goal of the game for Wycombe in their win over Charlton Athletic in the quarter-finals of the Football League Cup. He also scored to help Wycombe to a 1st-leg draw in the League Cup semi-finals in a momentous match for Wycombe against Chelsea. This meant that he had scored in every round so far and had ended Chelsea's run of clean sheets in the competition.

On 22 January 2007, Easter was subject of transfer speculation regarding a possible move to Premier League sides Manchester City and Blackburn Rovers, however, he remained at Wycombe, and was named in the PFA League Two Team of the Year for the 2006–07 season. During the 2006–07 season Easter also won the players player of the year award.

=== Plymouth Argyle ===
In October 2007, Easter joined Plymouth Argyle on loan, with a view to a permanent move. He made his debut for the club on 28 October 2007, coming on as a substitute for Sylvan Ebanks-Blake in a 2–0 defeat to Preston North End. Easter scored his first goal for Plymouth after coming on as a substitute, in the 2–1 loss at home to West Brom, and made his first start three games later, at home to Bristol City.

On 4 January 2008, Easter joined Plymouth permanently, for an estimated fee of £210,000.

In August, Easter handed in a transfer request to Plymouth, citing "personal problems" as his reason for wanting to leave. He subsequently asked to be taken off the transfer list and decided to stay with Argyle.

On 25 September, Easter joined Millwall on a one-month loan. He made his debut for the club on 28 September, scoring a goal in a 2–1 win away to Swindon, a match in which he was also sent off. On 21 November 2008 Easter left Millwall having scored just 1 goal in 6 games to join Colchester United on loan until the end of the year. Easter then suffered a medial ligament injury, which saw him return to Argyle on 18 December after scoring 2 goals in 5 appearances he also decided to stay at Argyle and fight for his place rather than move elsewhere.

=== Milton Keynes Dons ===
On 14 July 2009, Easter joined Milton Keynes Dons on a two-year contract for an undisclosed fee and became Paul Ince's second signing since returning to the club. He scored his first goal for MK Dons, a penalty, in a first round League Cup tie at home to Swindon Town, with the Dons eventually going on to lose 4–1. Easter scored his second Dons goal, also a penalty, at home to former loan club Colchester United, with the Dons going on to win the game 2–1. Easter would go on to score 20 goals in all competitions for MK Dons during his first season at the club, with 15 of those coming in league games. In his first year at the club Easter won the sports writers player of the year award as well as the club's leading scorer award at the annual awards dinner.

=== Swansea City ===
On 25 November 2010, Easter moved to Championship side Swansea City on loan, with the loan spell due to expire on 31 January 2011. Despite being Cardiff-born, Easter revealed the move to his hometown club's fierce south Wales rivals was a no-brainer; "My contract at MK Dons ends at the end of the season and I've made it clear that I want to play Championship football and have international aspirations. So the opportunity to come here was perfect for me. Swansea keep the ball well and have lots of possession. Hopefully I can work off the midfielders and the wingers and get myself some goals." Easter scored his first goal on his first start for Swansea against Barnsley on 28 December 2010. Although the striker revealed his desire to make the move to south Wales permanent, he returned to Milton Keynes at the request of his parent club on 13 January, having made seven league and cup appearances for the Swans, with five of those coming from the bench.

=== Crystal Palace ===
Just 24 hours after leaving Swansea to return to Milton Keynes, Easter joined Championship side Crystal Palace for an undisclosed fee, signing a two-and-a-half-year deal. Easter was handed the number 19 shirt by Dougie Freedman, becoming the Scot's second signing (after Alex Marrow) since taking over the managerial reins at Selhurst Park. He made his debut for his new club during an away fixture against Swansea City on 15 January, less than two days after having his loan stint at the south Wales club cut short by MK Dons. He scored his first goal for Palace in a 3–3 draw with Reading on 26 February 2011. On 25 January 2012 Easter missed a penalty in the League Cup semi final second leg shootout against Cardiff City, who progressed to the final at Palace's expense.

=== Millwall ===
On 15 March 2013, Easter joined Millwall on loan until the end of the season. He made his debut the following day in a 2–0 win over Charlton Athletic, scoring with his first touch of the ball after coming on as a substitute. On 28 May 2013, it was announced that Easter would link up permanently with Millwall in July 2013, signing a one-year contract.

=== Bristol Rovers ===
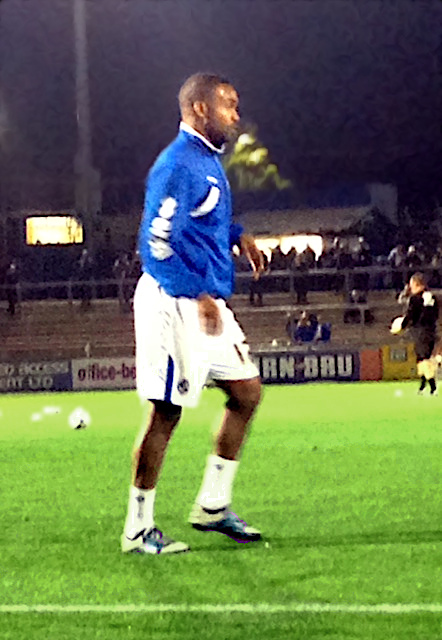
Easter at Bristol Rovers (October, 2015)

On 12 January 2015, Easter signed on a permanent deal for Bristol Rovers subject to a medical.

Easter scored 1 goal in the 2014–15 season against Aldershot Town. He scored his second goal for the club in a 3–1 home win vs Barnet F.C. Easter finished the 2015–16 season with 7 goals as he played a helpful part in the club's second consecutive promotion.

Easter opened his account for the 2016–17 season with the opening goal in a 2–1 win over Oxford United On 19 January 2017, it was announced that manager Darrell Clarke told six players that they could leave the club, one of which being Easter. However Easter came back into the side and made a further 6 appearances that season following his comeback in a 2–1 victory over Chesterfield where he came off the bench replacing Luke James in the 72nd minute. On 28 April 2017, it was announced that Easter along with fellow first team players Cristian Montaño and Will Puddy were a few of the players who were not to be retained for the 2017–18 season. He played his final game in the blue and white quarters on 30 April 2017, in a thrilling final day 4–3 defeat to former club Millwall during which he scored the opening goal to halve the deficit to 2–1 after Billy Bodin's long range effort was deflected onto the post.

=== Retirement ===
In August 2017, Easter announced his retirement from playing, following his release by Bristol Rovers.

== International career ==
On 26 January 2007, Easter received his first call-up to the Welsh national team from manager John Toshack for the friendly against Northern Ireland, and made his debut as a substitute in the game on 6 February. On 28 March he made his first start for Wales against San Marino.

== Personal life ==
Jermaine has a brother, Jamal, who is also a footballer and a younger brother Joshua.

Following his retirement from football, Easter became a football agent with clients including Neco Williams.

== Career statistics ==
=== Club ===
Appearances and goals by club, season and competition
Club	Season	League			FA Cup		League Cup		Other		Total	
Club	Season	Division	Apps	Goals	Apps	Goals	Apps	Goals	Apps	Goals	Apps	Goals
Hartlepool United	2000–01	Division Three	4	0	0	0	0	0	2	0	6	0
Hartlepool United	2001–02	Division Three	12	2	0	0	0	0	0	0	12	2
Hartlepool United	2002–03	Division Three	8	0	0	0	0	0	1	0	9	0
Hartlepool United	2003–04	Division Two	3	0	0	0	0	0	0	0	3	0
Hartlepool United	Total		27	2	0	0	0	0	3	0	30	2
Cambridge United	2003–04	Division Three	15	2	0	0	0	0	0	0	15	2
Cambridge United	2004–05	League Two	24	6	1	0	1	0	2	1	28	7
Cambridge United	Total		39	8	1	0	1	0	2	1	43	9
Boston United	2004–05	League Two	9	3	0	0	0	0	0	0	9	3
Stockport County	2005–06	League Two	19	8	3	3	1	0	0	0	23	11
Wycombe Wanderers	2005–06	League Two	15	2	0	0	0	0	2	0	17	2
Wycombe Wanderers	2006–07	League Two	38	17	1	1	7	6	1	0	47	24
Wycombe Wanderers	2007–08	League Two	6	2	0	0	0	0	0	0	6	2
Wycombe Wanderers	Total		59	21	1	1	7	6	3	0	70	28
Plymouth Argyle	2007–08	Championship	32	6	2	0	0	0	0	0	34	6
Plymouth Argyle	2008–09	Championship	4	0	0	0	1	0	0	0	5	0
Plymouth Argyle	Total		36	6	2	0	1	0	0	0	39	6
Millwall	2008–09	League One	5	1	1	0	0	0	0	0	6	1
Colchester United	2008–09	League One	5	2	0	0	0	0	0	0	5	2
Milton Keynes Dons	2009–10	League One	36	14	3	1	1	1	5	3	45	19
Milton Keynes Dons	2010–11	League One	14	0	0	0	3	2	1	0	18	2
Milton Keynes Dons	Total		50	14	3	1	4	3	6	3	63	21
Swansea City	2010–11	Championship	6	1	1	0	0	0	0	0	7	1
Crystal Palace	2010–11	Championship	14	2	0	0	0	0	0	0	14	2
Crystal Palace	2011–12	Championship	33	5	0	0	4	1	0	0	37	6
Crystal Palace	2011–12	Championship	8	1	2	0	1	1	0	0	11	2
Crystal Palace	Total		55	8	2	0	5	2	0	0	62	10
Millwall	2012–13	Championship	9	1	0	0	0	0	0	0	9	1
Millwall	2013–14	Championship	20	3	1	0	1	0	0	0	22	3
Millwall	2014–15	Championship	9	1	0	0	2	0	0	0	11	1
Millwall	Total		38	5	1	0	3	0	0	0	42	5
Bristol Rovers	2014–15	Conference Premier	5	1	0	0	0	0	0	0	5	1
Bristol Rovers	2015–16	League Two	42	7	1	0	1	0	2	1	46	8
Bristol Rovers	2016–17	League One	21	4	1	0	1	0	2	1	25	5
Bristol Rovers	Total		68	12	2	0	2	0	4	2	76	14
Career total			416	91	17	5	24	11	18	6	475	113

=== International ===
Appearances and goals by national team and year
National team	Year	Apps	Goals
Wales
Wales	2007	6	0
Wales	2008	1	0
Wales	2009	1	0
Wales	2011	2	0
Wales	2013	1	0
Wales	2014	1	0
Total		12	0

== Honours ==
Bristol Rovers

- Football League Two third place promotion: 2015–16
- Football Conference play-offs: 2014–15

Individual

- PFA Team of the Year: 2006–07 Football League Two
- Wycombe Wanderers Players' Player of the Year: 2006–07
- Milton Keynes Dons Sports Writer Player of the Year: 2009–10
