= Phillip Christon =

American film director and screenwriter

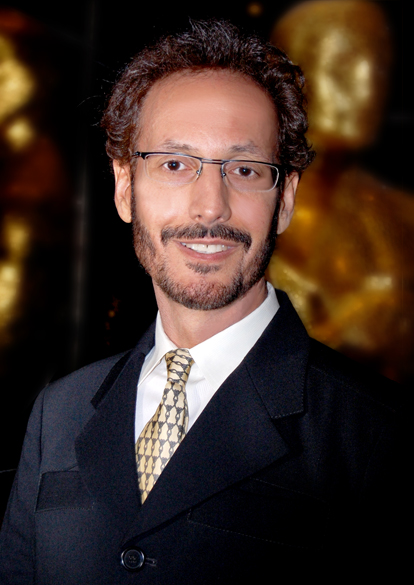
- Christon in 2011
- Born: June 11, 1961 (age 65); San Francisco, California, U.S.
- Education: UCLA Film School (BFA)
- Occupations: Film director, producer, screenwriter
- Years active: 1978–present
- Notable work: Ricky & Lucy, The Bundle, The Chosen One

Phillip Christon (born June 11, 1961) is an American film director and screenwriter. His writing and directing work includes Ricky & Lucy, The Bundle, The Chosen One and numerous commercials and music videos.

== Background ==
Christon was born into a working class San Francisco household in the prime of the 60's counter-culture revolution. Christon was heavily influenced by the expansion of pop culture. He started displaying talent at an early age, writing and directing professional children's theater from age 13 and creating numerous short 8mm films. Upon graduating summa cum laude from the UCLA Film School, Phillip interned at Warner Bros. Studios under the mentorship of Jonathan Demme (The Silence of the Lambs, Philadelphia, Rachel Getting Married) working alongside industry producers Gary Goetzman (Mama Mia!, My Big Fat Greek Wedding, Where the Wild Things Are) and Charles Mulvehill (The Godfather, The Last Samurai, Harold and Maude).

== Early career ==
Christon started his Hollywood career as one of the youngest First Assistant Directors in independent feature film production, earmarked by completion bond companies and working side by side with a host of filmmakers, ranging from Gus Van Sant, Bill Condon, Gore Verbinski and Tony Kaye to photographers Herb Ritts, Matthew Rolston and Annie Leibovitz, as well as talent from Keanu Reeves and Madonna to Michael Jordan.

He worked with agencies DDB Needham, Leo Burnett and TBWA/Chiat/Day on commercials for brands including Nike, Coca-Cola, Budweiser, Gatorade, Mercedes-Benz and many more. Christon continues to direct live theater as well, including PS 122’s Filmmakers Make Theater Series in New York.

== Filmography ==
Christon has contributed to a wide variety of projects as either a writer, director, producer or first assistant director. His directorial debut, The Chosen One, which he wrote and produced, is a controversial drama starring Michelle Forbes and Yvette Cruise which achieved multiple SRO audience screenings at Raleigh Studios Chaplin Theater in Hollywood, received the Bronze Award at the WorldFest Houston International Film Festival, and was a finalist at the USA Film Festival, Dallas.

His follow-up short, The Bundle premiered at the Hamptons International Film Festival, immediately followed by the Seattle International Film Festival before screening at The Cannes International Film Festival. Christon's original screenplay Ricky & Lucy was a recent semi-finalist at the Austin Film Festival, the nation's premiere screenwriting festival, chosen from over 10,000 submissions.
