= Lewis Christon =

English footballer

Personal information
- Full name: Lewis John Christon
- Date of birth: 24 January 1989 (age 37)
- Place of birth: Milton Keynes, England
- Position: Defender

Youth career
- 2001–2006: Wycombe Wanderers

Senior career*
Years	Team	Apps	(Gls)
2006–2009	Wycombe Wanderers	8	(0)
2008	→ Woking (loan)	2	(0)
2008	→ AFC Wimbledon (loan)	0	(0)
2008	→ Oxford City (loan)	0	(0)
- * Club domestic league appearances and goals as of 14:05, 5 January 2009 (UTC)

Lewis John Christon (born 24 January 1989 in Milton Keynes, Buckinghamshire) is an English professional footballer who plays as a defender without a club.

Christon was a highly rated graduate of Wycombe Wanderers's youth academy and signed his first professional contract in the summer of 2006. He spent the end of the 2007–08 season on loan at AFC Wimbledon. He was released by the club by mutual consent on 5 January 2009.He is father of Maxwell and Aubrey christon
