= 2002–03 FC Porto season =

FC Porto
2002–03 season
- President: Jorge Nuno Pinto da Costa
- Head coach: José Mourinho
- Stadium: Estádio das Antas
- Primeira Liga: 1st
- Taça de Portugal: Winners
- UEFA Cup: Winners
- Top goalscorer: League: Hélder Postiga (13); All: Derlei (21)
Home colours	Away colours	Third colours

The 2002–03 season was the 118th season in the existence of FC Porto and the club's 88th consecutive season in the top flight of Portuguese football. In addition to the domestic league, Porto participated in this season's editions of the Taça de Portugal and the UEFA Cup.

== Players ==
=== First-team squad ===
Squad at end of season

Note: Flags indicate national team as defined under FIFA eligibility rules; some limited exceptions apply. Players may hold more than one non-FIFA nationality.

No.	Pos.	Nation	Player
12	GK	POR	Bruno Vale
99	GK	POR	Vítor Baía
13	GK	POR	Nuno
1	GK	POR	Hilário
2	DF	POR	Jorge Costa
3	DF	POR	Pedro Emanuel
4	DF	POR	Ricardo Carvalho
5	DF	POR	Ricardo Costa
6	MF	POR	Costinha
7	DF	POR	Carlos Secretário
8	DF	POR	Nuno Valente
9	FW	LTU	Edgaras Jankauskas
10	MF	POR	Deco
11	FW	BRA	Derlei
20	MF	POR	Paulinho Santos
15	MF	RUS	Dmitri Alenichev
41	FW	POR	Hélder Postiga
77	FW	RSA	Benni McCarthy

No.	Pos.	Nation	Player
47	DF	POR	Reinaldo
18	MF	POR	Maniche
19	MF	BRA	Tiago
20	DF	POR	Mário Silva
21	FW	BRA	Maciel
22	DF	POR	Paulo Ferreira
53	MF	POR	Elias
28	MF	POR	Bruno
29	FW	POR	Hugo Almeida
77	MF	HUN	Ákos Buzsáky
36	MF	POR	Pedro Nuno
35	DF	POR	Hugo Luz
52	MF	POR	Manuel José
25	MF	POR	Cândido Costa
28	MF	BRA	Clayton
16	DF	POR	César Peixoto
21	MF	POR	Capucho
78	MF	POR	Marco Ferreira

== Competitions ==
=== Overall record ===
Competition	First match	Last match	Starting round	Final position	Record							
Competition	First match	Last match	Starting round	Final position	Pld	W	D	L	GF	GA	GD	Win %
Primeira Liga	25 August 2002	1 June 2003	Matchday 1	Winners	34	27	5	2	73	26	+47	79.41
Taça de Portugal	24 November 2002	15 June 2003	Fourth round	Winners	6	6	0	0	16	2	+14	100.00
Supertaça Cândido de Oliveira	10 August 2003		Final	Winners	1	1	0	0	1	0	+1	100.00
UEFA Cup	19 September 2002	21 May 2003	First round	Winners	13	8	2	3	29	10	+19	61.54
Total					54	42	7	5	119	38	+81	77.78

Source: Competitions

=== Primeira Liga ===
==== League table ====
Pos	Team	Pld	W	D	L	GF	GA	GD	Pts	Qualification or relegation
1	Porto (C)	34	27	5	2	73	26	+47	86	Qualification to Champions League group stage
2	Benfica	34	23	6	5	74	27	+47	75	Qualification to Champions League third qualifying round
3	Sporting CP	34	17	8	9	52	38	+14	59	Qualification to UEFA Cup first round
4	Vitória de Guimarães	34	14	8	12	47	46	+1	50	
5	União de Leiria	34	13	10	11	49	47	+2	49	Qualification to UEFA Cup qualifying round (Note: Leiria qualified for the UEFA Cup as Portuguese Cup runners-up)

Source: Primeira Liga
Rules for classification: 1) points; 2) head-to-head points; 3) head-to-head goal difference; 4) goal difference; 5) number of goals scored
(C) Champions

==== Results summary ====
Overall								Home						Away					
Pld	W	D	L	GF	GA	GD	Pts	W	D	L	GF	GA	GD	W	D	L	GF	GA	GD
34	27	5	2	73	26	+47	86	16	1	0	45	12	+33	11	4	2	28	14	+14

Source: Liga Portugal

==== Results by round ====
Round	1	2	3	4	5	6	7	8	9	10	11	12	13	14	15	16	17	18	19	20	21	22	23	24	25	26	27	28	29	30	31	32	33	34
Ground	H	A	H	A	H	A	H	A	H	A	A	H	A	H	A	H	A	A	H	A	H	A	H	A	H	A	H	H	A	H	A	H	A	H
Result	D	W	W	W	W	D	W	D	W	W	W	W	W	W	W	W	W	W	W	W	W	L	W	W	W	W	W	W	D	W	L	W	D	W
Position																																		

Source: Liga Portugal
A = Away; H = Home; W = Win; D = Draw; L = Loss

==== Matches ====
25 August 2002 1	Porto	2–2	Os Belenenses	Porto
WEST (UTC+1)	Postiga 66'; Jankauskas 90'	Report	Neca 12', 88' (pen.)	Stadium: Estádio das Antas; Referee: Pedro Proença

2 September 2002 2	Boavista	0–1	Porto	Porto
WEST (UTC+1)	Gaúcho (red card) 89'	Report	Costinha 45'; Derlei (red card) 89'	Stadium: Estádio do Dragão; Referee: Duarte Gomes

15 September 2002 3	Porto	3–1	Gil Vicente	Porto
WEST (UTC+1)	Maniche 19', 72' (pen.); Emanuel (red card) 89'; Alenichev 90'	Report	Amaro 14'	Stadium: Estádio das Antas; Referee: João Vilas Boas

23 September 2002 4	Vitória de Guimarães	0–2	Porto	Guimarães
WEST (UTC+1)	Rafael (red card) 42'	Report	Deco 41'; Maniche (red card) 52'; Pereira 75'	Stadium: Estádio D. Afonso Henriques; Referee: Martins dos Santos

28 September 2002 5	Porto	1–0	Marítimo	Porto
WEST (UTC+1)	Deco 11'	Report		Stadium: Estádio das Antas; Referee: Paulo Baptista

7 October 2002 6	Beira-Mar	1–1	Porto	Aveiro
WEST (UTC+1)	Sousa 64'	Report	Derlei 10'	Stadium: Estádio Mário Duarte; Referee: João Ferreira

20 October 2002 7	Porto	2–1	Benfica	Porto
WEST (UTC+1)	Bonfim 20' (o.g.); Costa (red card) 39'; Deco 71'	Report	Mendes 4'; Bonfim (red card) 71'; Monteiro (red card) 75'	Stadium: Estádio das Antas; Referee: Paulo Costa

26 October 2002 8	União de Leiria	2–2	Porto	Marinha Grande
WEST (UTC+1)	Paulo 11'; Edson 47'; Manuel (red card) 90'	Report	Clayton 7'; Deco 13'	Stadium: Estádio Municipal da Marinha Grande; Referee: Pedro Proença

4 November 2002 9	Porto	5–2	Nacional	Porto
WEST (UTC+1)	Maniche 27'; Postiga 32', 62'; Clayton 36'; Deco 47'	Report	Adriano 22'; Rossato 70'	Stadium: Estádio das Antas; Referee: António Costa

9 November 2002 10	Vitória de Setúbal	0–1	Porto	Setúbal
WEST (UTC+1)		Report	Postiga 45'	Stadium: Estádio do Bonfim; Referee: Olegário Benquerença

18 November 2002 11	Moreirense	0–1	Porto	Moreira de Cónegos
WEST (UTC+1)		Report	Derlei 73'	Stadium: Parque de Jogos Comendador Joaquim de Almeida Freitas; Referee: Bruno Paixão

2 December 2002 12	Porto	4–1	Académica	Porto
WEST (UTC+1)	Maniche 50' (pen.); Deco 77'; Postiga 79'; Jankauskas 90+2'	Report	Monteiro 5'; Dino (red card) 63'	Stadium: Estádio das Antas; Referee: Jacinto Paixão

8 December 2002 13	Santa Clara	1–3	Porto	Ponta Delgada
WEST (UTC+1)	Figueiredo 75'	Report	Postiga 31', 62'; Jankauskas 73'	Stadium: Estádio de São Miguel; Referee: Paulo Baptista

16 December 2002 14	Porto	2–1	Paços de Ferreira	Porto
WEST (UTC+1)	Postiga 32'; Jankauskas 90'	Report	Beto 58'	Stadium: Estádio das Antas; Referee: Paulo Paraty

22 December 2002 15	Varzim	0–2	Porto	Póvoa de Varzim
WEST (UTC+1)		Report	Capucho 22'; Costinha 89'	Stadium: Estádio do Varzim SC; Referee: José Pratas

5 January 2003 16	Porto	3–0	Braga	Porto
WEST (UTC+1)	Capucho 22'; Deco 51'; Jankauskas 75'	Report		Stadium: Estádio das Antas; Referee: Pedro Henriques

11 January 2003 17	Sporting CP	0–1	Porto	Lisbon
WEST (UTC+1)		Report	Costinha 3'	Stadium: Estádio José Alvalade; Referee: Lucílio Batista

19 January 2003 18	Os Belenenses	1–3	Porto	Lisbon
WEST (UTC+1)	Bezerra 16'	Report	Costa 49', 52'; Alenichev 90'	Stadium: Estádio do Restelo; Referee: Olegário Benquerença

25 January 2003 19	Porto	1–0	Boavista	Porto
WEST (UTC+1)	Jankauskas 71'	Report		Stadium: Estádio das Antas; Referee: Mário Mendes

2 February 2003 20	Gil Vicente	3–5	Porto	Barcelos
WEST (UTC+1)	Nandinho 10'; Azevedo 74'; Filho 79'	Report	Postiga 25'; Costinha 46', 48'; Maniche 59'; Jankauskas 88'	Stadium: Estádio Adelino Ribeiro Novo; Referee: Augusto Duarte

9 February 2003 21	Porto	2–1	Vitória de Guimarães	Porto
WEST (UTC+1)	Peixoto 26'; Capucho 40'	Report	Almeida 65'	Stadium: Estádio das Antas; Referee: Paulo Paraty

15 February 2003 22	Marítimo	2–1	Porto	Funchal
WEST (UTC+1)	van der Gaag 17'; Pepe (red card) 51'; Gaúcho 71'	Report	Deco (red card) 51'; Derlei 67'	Stadium: Estádio do Marítimo; Referee: Isidoro Rodrigues

23 February 2003 23	Porto	3–0	Beira-Mar	Porto
WEST (UTC+1)	Peixoto 6' (pen.); Postiga 67'; Jankauskas 90+3'	Report		Stadium: Estádio das Antas; Referee: António Taia

4 March 2003 24	Benfica	0–1	Porto	Lisbon
WEST (UTC+1)	Rocha (red card) 70'	Report	Deco 36'	Stadium: Estádio da Luz; Referee: António Costa

16 March 2003 25	Porto	2–0	União de Leiria	Porto
WEST (UTC+1)	Alenichev 18'; Deco 80'	Report	Aguiar (red card) 76'	Stadium: Estádio das Antas; Referee: Mário Mendes

24 March 2003 26	Nacional	1–2	Porto	Funchal
WEST (UTC+1)	Adriano 42'	Report	Derlei 27'; Carvalho 88'	Stadium: Estádio da Madeira; Referee: João Ferreira

6 April 2003 27	Porto	3–0	Vitória de Setúbal	Porto
WEST (UTC+1)	Ferreira 35'; Pessoa 71' (o.g.); Alenichev 77'	Report		Stadium: Estádio das Antas; Referee: Bruno Paixão

19 April 2003 28	Porto	2–1	Moreirense	Porto
WEST (UTC+1)	Lomba 37' (o.g.); Peixoto 60' (pen.)	Report	Mendes (red card) 45'; Montanini 76'	Stadium: Estádio das Antas; Referee: José Godinho

28 April 2003 29	Académica	1–1	Porto	Coimbra
WEST (UTC+1)	Oliveira 36'	Report	Derlei 72'	Stadium: Estádio Municipal Sérgio Conceição; Referee: Pedro Proença

4 May 2003 30	Porto	5–0	Santa Clara	Porto
WEST (UTC+1)	Maniche 5'; Derlei 9', 48'; Deco 77'; Postiga 86'	Report		Stadium: Estádio das Antas; Referee: Elmano Santos

11 May 2003 31	Paços de Ferreira	1–0	Porto	Paços de Ferreira
WEST (UTC+1)	Paulo Sousa (red card) 39'; Armando (red card) 60'; Cadú 89'	Report	Pereira (red card) 39'	Stadium: Estádio da Mata Real; Referee: António Costa

17 May 2003 32	Porto	3–2	Varzim	Porto
WEST (UTC+1)	Jankauskas 12'; Capucho 16'; Santos 42'	Report	Zé António 63', 74'	Stadium: Estádio das Antas; Referee: Isidoro Rodrigues

25 May 2003 33	Braga	1–1	Porto	Braga
WEST (UTC+1)	Barroso 37'	Report	Postiga 48'	Stadium: Estádio 1º de Maio; Referee: Mário Mendes

1 June 2003 34	Porto	2–0	Sporting CP	Porto
WEST (UTC+1)	Postiga 36'; Contreras 78' (o.g.)	Report		Stadium: Estádio das Antas; Referee: Francisco Ferreira

=== Taça de Portugal ===
24 November 2002 Fourth round	Porto	2–0	Trofense	Estádio das Antas, Porto
	Tiago 5'; Capucho 28'

15 January 2003 Fifth round	Porto	2–1	Gil Vicente	Estádio das Antas, Porto
	Clayton 6'; Maniche 33'		Nunes 80'	Referee: Pedro Proença

29 January 2003 Sixth round	Vitória de Guimarães	1–2	Porto	Estádio Dr. Machado de Matos, Felgueiras
	Romeu 13'		Costa 67'; Derlei 73'	Referee: Pedro Henriques

8 March 2003 Quarter-finals	Porto	7–0	Varzim	Estádio das Antas, Porto
	M. Ferreira 20', 30', 74'; Jankauskas 23'; Peixoto 67'; Clayton 81'; Nuno 90' (pen.)			Referee: Augusto Duarte

14 April 2003 Semi-finals	Porto	2–0	Naval	Estádio das Antas, Porto
	Derlei 55'; Deco 80'			Referee: Lucílio Batista

15 June 2003 Final	Porto	1–0	União de Leiria	Estádio Nacional, Oeiras
16:00	Derlei 64'			Attendance: 38,000; Referee: Pedro Henriques

=== UEFA Cup ===
==== First round ====
19 September 2002 First leg	Porto (Portugal)	6–0	(Poland) Polonia Warsaw	Estádio das Antas, Porto
22:30	Jankauskas 20', 56'; Derlei 37'; Maniche 55'; Hélder Postiga 69', 89'	Report		Attendance: 23,810; Referee: Hermann Albrecht (Germany)

3 October 2002 Second leg	Polonia Warsaw (Poland)	2–0 (2–6 agg.)	(Portugal) Porto	Wisła Stadium, Płock
17:00	Łukasiewicz 67'; Kuś 81'	Report		Attendance: 5,000; Referee: Leif Sundell (Sweden)

==== Second round ====
31 October 2002 First leg	Austria Wien	0–1	(Portugal) Porto	Ernst-Happel-Stadion, Vienna
20:30		Report	Derlei 70'	Attendance: 29,200; Referee: Kristinn Jakobsson (Iceland)

14 November 2002 Second leg	Porto (Portugal)	2–0 (3–0 agg.)	Austria Wien	Estádio das Antas, Porto
22:30	Postiga 29'; Derlei 86'	Report		Attendance: 22,245; Referee: Grzegorz Gilewski (Poland)

==== Third round ====
28 November 2002 First leg	Porto (Portugal)	3–0	(France) Lens	Estádio das Antas, Porto
22:30	Postiga 36'; Derlei 45'; Jankauskas 87'	Report		Attendance: 32,041; Referee: Graham Poll (England)

12 December 2002 Second leg	Lens (France)	1–0 (1–3 agg.)	(Portugal) Porto	Stade Félix-Bollaert, Lens
21:15	Song 28'	Report		Attendance: 35,026; Referee: Vladimír Hriňák (Slovakia)

==== Fourth round ====
20 February 2003 First leg	Porto (Portugal)	6–1	(Turkey) Denizlispor	Estádio das Antas, Porto
22:00	Capucho 48'; Derlei 53'; R. Costa 65'; Jankauskas 70'; Deco 73'; Alenichev 82'	Report	Kratochvíl 78'	Attendance: 21,941; Referee: Massimo Busacca (Switzerland)

27 February 2003 Second leg	Denizlispor (Turkey)	2–2 (3–8 agg.)	(Portugal) Porto	Atatürk Stadium, Denizli
20:00	Martin 52'; Özkan 58'	Report	Derlei 42'; Clayton 84'	Attendance: 4,300; Referee: Claude Colombo (France)

==== Quarter-finals ====
13 March 2003 First leg	Porto (Portugal)	0–1	(Greece) Panathinaikos	Estádio das Antas, Porto
22:00		Report	Olisadebe 73'	Attendance: 44,310; Referee: Domenico Messina (Italy)

20 March 2003 Second leg	Panathinaikos (Greece)	0–2 (a.e.t.) (1–2 agg.)	(Portugal) Porto	Leoforos Alexandras Stadium, Athens
19:30		Report	Derlei 16', 103'	Attendance: 14,295; Referee: René Temmink (Netherlands)

==== Semi-final ====
10 April 2003 First leg	Porto (Portugal)	4–1	(Italy) Lazio	Estádio das Antas, Porto
22:00	Maniche 10'; Derlei 28', 50'; Postiga 56'	Report	López 6'	Attendance: 45,518; Referee: Kyros Vassaras (Greece)

24 April 2003 Second leg	Lazio (Italy)	0–0 (1–4 agg.)	(Portugal) Porto	Stadio Olimpico, Rome
21:00		Report		Attendance: 69,873; Referee: Gilles Veissiere (France)

==== Final ====
21 May 2003 Final	Celtic (Scotland)	2–3 (a.e.t.)	(Portugal) Porto	Estadio Olímpico de Sevilla, Seville
20:45	Larsson 47', 57'	Report	Derlei 45', 115'; Alenichev 54'	Attendance: 52,972; Referee: Ľuboš Micheľ (Slovakia)
