= 2003 Taça de Portugal final =

- Event: 2002–03 Taça de Portugal
Porto	União de Leiria
1	0
- Date: 15 June 2003
- Venue: Estádio Nacional, Oeiras
- Man of the Match: Derlei (Porto)
- Referee: Pedro Henriques (Lisbon)
- Attendance: 38,000

The 2003 Taça de Portugal final was the final match of the 2002–03 Taça de Portugal, the 63rd season of the Taça de Portugal, the premier Portuguese football cup competition organized by the Portuguese Football Federation (FPF). The match was played on 15 June 2003 at the Estádio Nacional in Oeiras between Primeira Liga sides Porto and União de Leiria. Porto defeated União de Leiria 1–0, thanks to a second-half strike from Brazilian striker Derlei. Porto's cup victory would give them a twelfth Taça de Portugal, and seal the treble after winning the Primeira Liga and the UEFA Cup a few weeks before the cup final.

In Portugal, the final was televised live on TVI and Sport TV. As Porto claimed both league and cup double in the same season, cup runners-up União de Leiria faced their cup final opponents in the 2003 Supertaça Cândido de Oliveira at the Estádio D. Afonso Henriques in Guimarães.

== Match ==
=== Details ===
15 June 2003
17:15 WEST

Porto	1–0	União de Leiria
Derlei 64'

Estádio Nacional, Oeiras
Attendance: 38,000
Referee: Pedro Henriques (Lisbon)

Porto	União de Leiria

GK	99	(Portugal) Vítor Baía
RB	22	(Portugal) Paulo Ferreira
CB	2	(Portugal) Jorge Costa (c)
CB	4	(Portugal) Ricardo Carvalho
LB	5	(Portugal) Ricardo Costa	(yellow card) 79'
DM	66	(Portugal) Tiago		(substituted off) 88'
CM	15	(Russia) Dmitri Alenichev
CM	18	(Portugal) Maniche
AM	10	(Portugal) Deco
CF	41	(Portugal) Hélder Postiga	(yellow card) 44'	(substituted off) 87'
CF	11	(Brazil) Derlei		(substituted off) 68'
Substitutes:
GK	13	(Portugal) Nuno
DF	3	(Portugal) Pedro Emanuel
DF	7	(Portugal) Carlos Secretário
DF	30	(Portugal) Mário Silva		(substituted on) 88'
FW	9	(Lithuania) Edgaras Jankauskas		(substituted on) 87'
FW	21	(Portugal) Capucho		(substituted on) 68'
FW	28	(Brazil) Clayton
Manager:
(Portugal) José Mourinho

GK	78	(Brazil) Helton
RB	17	(Portugal) Renato	(yellow card) 44'
CB	5	(Portugal) Paulo Gomes
LB	4	(Brazil) Gabriel	(yellow card) 76'
RM	2	(Portugal) Luís Bilro (c)
CM	16	(Portugal) Leão		(substituted off) 66'
LM	27	(Brazil) Edson		(substituted off) 76'
AM	6	(Canada) Fernando Aguiar		(substituted off) 72'
AM	13	(Portugal) João Manuel	(yellow card) 59'
CF	21	(Brazil) Maciel
CF	9	(Brazil) Jean Carlos
Substitutes:
GK	1	(Portugal) Paulo Costinha
DF	19	(Portugal) Paulo Duarte
DF	25	(Portugal) Nuno Laranjeiro
MF	14	(Portugal) Alhandra		(substituted on) 76'
FW	11	(Cameroon) Roudolphe Douala		(substituted on) 66'
FW	22	(Angola) Freddy
FW	36	(Brazil) Márcio Mixirica		(substituted on) 72'
Manager:
(Portugal) Manuel Cajuda

2002–03 Taça de Portugal Winners
Porto
12th Title

Man of the match

- Derlei (Porto)

Match officials

- Assistant referees:
  - Carlos Matos (Lisbon)
  - João Esteves (Setúbal)
- Fourth official: Francisco Ferreira (Viana do Castelo)

Match rules

- 90 minutes.
- 30 minutes of extra time if necessary.
- Penalty shoot-out if scores still level.
- Seven named substitutes.
- Maximum of three substitutions.

== See also ==
- 2002–03 FC Porto season
