= Rika =

Rika may refer to:

== Places ==
- Rika, Ilam, Iran
- Rika, Jajce, a village in Bosnia and Herzegovina
- Rika, alternate name of Hasan Bagi-ye Rika, Iran
- Rika (river), in western Ukraine

== People ==
Rika is a Japanese feminine given name.

- Josefa Rika, a Fijian cricketer
- Rika Adachi (足立 梨花; born 1992), Japanese television personality and actress
- Rika Dialina, a Greek actress
- Rika Fujiwara (藤原 里華; born 1981), Japanese tennis player
- Rika Fukami (深見 梨加; born 1963), Japanese voice actress
- Rika Hiraki (平木 理化; born 1971), a former professional Japanese female tennis player
- Rika Hongo (本郷 理華; born 1996), Japanese figure skater
- Rika Hoshimi (星美 りか; born 1990), Japanese gravure idol and actress
- Rika Ishikawa (石川 梨華; born 1985), Japanese J-pop idol, singer, and actress
- Rika Izumi (泉 里香; born 1988), Japanese model, actress and singer
- Rika Kihira (紀平 梨花; born 2002), a Japanese figure skater
- Rika Kishino (岸野 里香; born 1994), Japanese singer and idol
- Rika Masuya (増矢 理花; born 1995), Japanese women's footballer
- Rica Matsumoto (松本 梨香, Matsumoto Rika; born 1968), Japanese voice actress
- Rika Omoto (大本 里佳; born 1997), Japanese swimmer
- Rika Sato (佐藤 利香; born 1971), Japanese table tennis player
- Rika Vagiani, Greek artist
- Rika Watanabe (渡辺 梨加; born 1995), Japanese idol and model

== Characters ==
- Majo Rika, a character from Ojamajo Doremi
- Rika (Phantasy Star IV), a character in the video game Phantasy Star IV
- Rika Furude, a character from Higurashi no Naku Koro ni
- Rika Izumi, a character from The Irregular at Magic High School
- Rika Nonaka (Ruki Makino in the Japanese version), a character from Digimon Tamers
- Rika Jōgasaki from The Idolmaster
- Rika Kamishiro from Tokyo Ghoul
- Rika Orimoto, a character from Jujutsu Kaisen 0
- Rika Sasaki, a character from Cardcaptor Sakura
- Rika, a character from the Touhou Project series
- Rika Shiguma, a character from the Haganai (Boku wa Tomodachi ga Sukunai) manga/anime series
- Rika Shinozaki (Lisbeth), a character in Sword Art Online
- Rika, a character from the role playing game Mystic Messenger
- Rika, a character from the visual Novel Amnesia
- Rika, a character from One Piece
- Rika, a character from the video games Pokémon Scarlet and Violet
- Rika Seto, a character from the mobile game D4DJ

== Other ==
- Riq'a, a calligraphic variety of Arabic script

== See also ==
- Rica (disambiguation)
