= Rui Faria =

Portuguese football coach

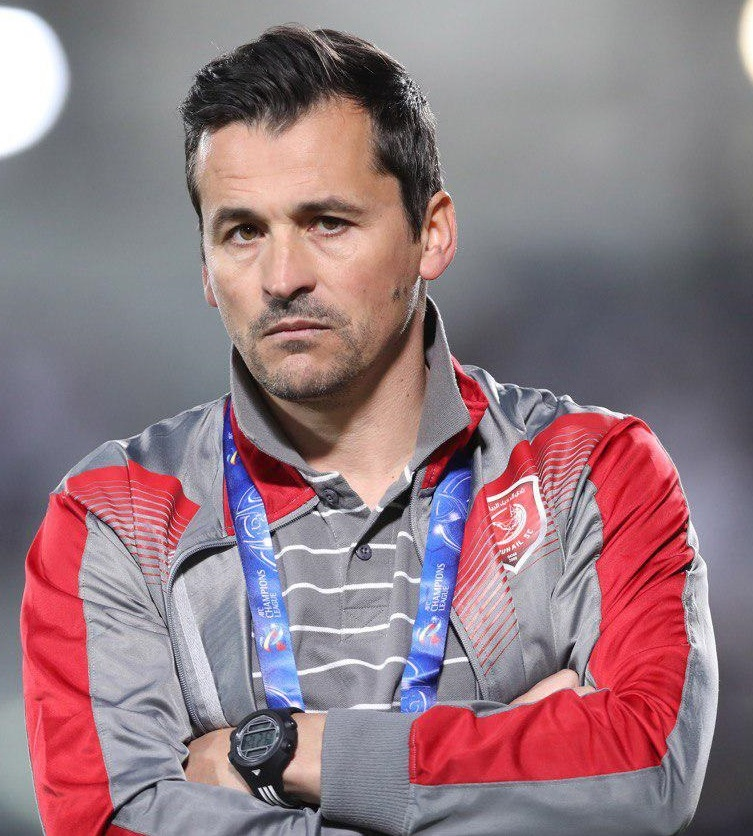
- Faria with Al-Duhail in 2019

Personal information
- Full name: Rui Filipe da Cunha Faria
- Date of birth: 14 June 1975 (age 51)
- Place of birth: Barcelos, Portugal

Managerial career
- Years: Team
- 2016–2018: Manchester United (assistant)
- 2019–2020: Al-Duhail

Rui Filipe da Cunha Faria (born 14 June 1975) is a Portuguese football coach, known for his work with football manager José Mourinho for 17 years.

== Biography ==
=== Early life ===
Faria was born in Balugães, a tiny parish of Barcelos in Portugal. Like Mourinho, he was a physical education graduate who had not played football at a high level. He completed his university education from the University of Porto studying alongside Carlos Carvalhal.

Faria's education took him to a seminar day at the Camp Nou, Barcelona's home stadium, where Mourinho was working as assistant manager to Louis van Gaal. Mourinho saw a kindred spirit in Faria, and when he took the União de Leiria job in April 2001, he hired Faria as his assistant and fitness coach.

=== Coaching career ===
Faria's early time at Leiria, emblematic of Mourinho's new fitness regime, led to a stand-off with the club's directors. Since then, the two have been inseparable, with Faria joining Porto in January 2002, Mourinho's first month in charge of his new club. He was part of the club's staff for their 2003 league, cup and UEFA Cup treble and won the UEFA Champions League in 2004 with the club. Faria then followed Mourinho to Chelsea that summer along with assistant manager Baltemar Brito, chief scout André Villas-Boas and goalkeeping coach Silvino Louro. He became ubiquitous in his Chelsea tracksuit on the London side's bench.

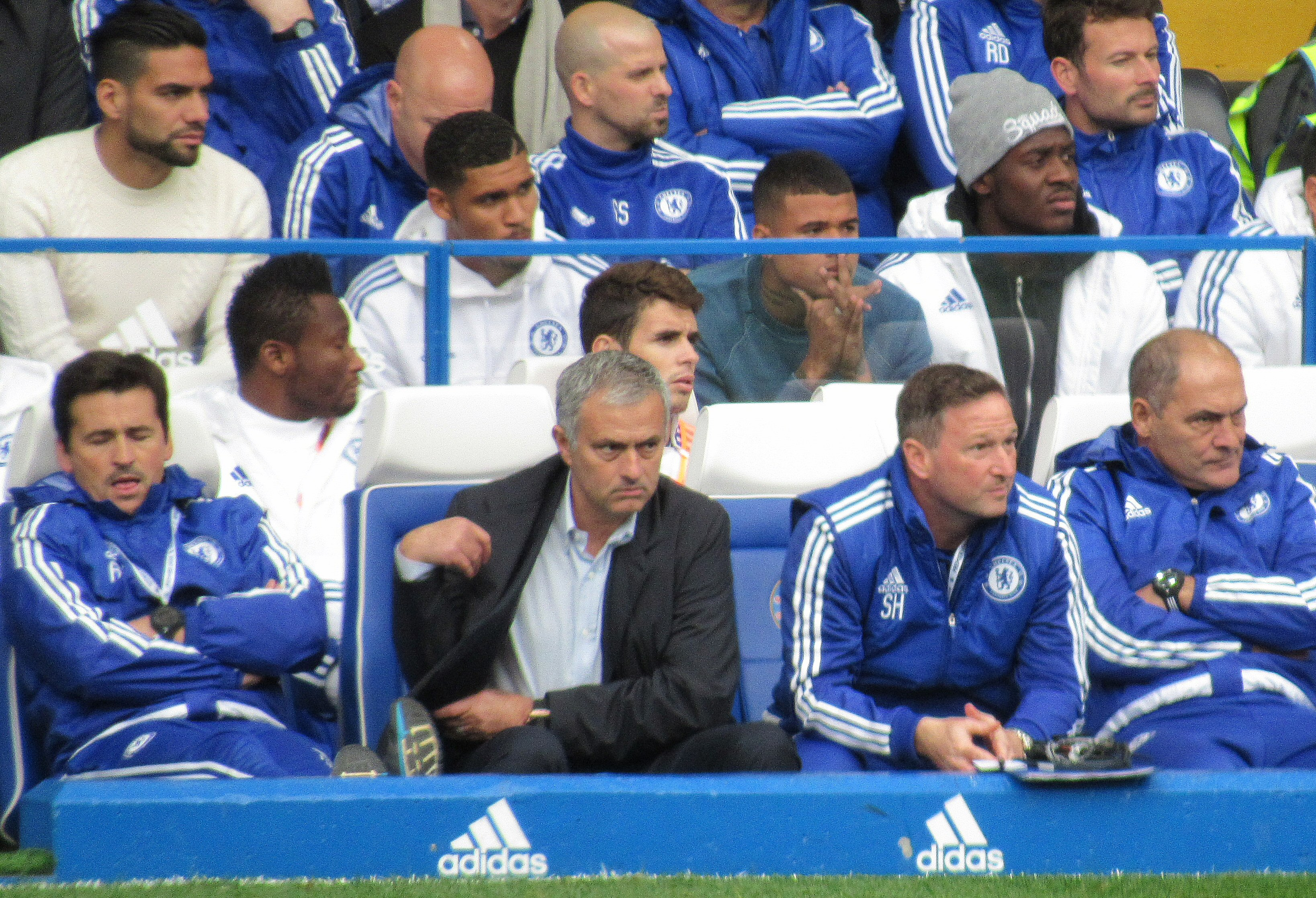
Faria (front row, furthest left) with Chelsea in October 2015

Faria left Chelsea in late 2007, following Mourinho out of the club, and joined him at Internazionale in the summer of 2008. In June 2009, André Villas-Boas left to manage Académica de Coimbra (later following in Mourinho's footsteps by taking over Porto, then Chelsea) and was replaced at Inter by José Morais. After winning the Serie A in their first season, the side completed a high-profile treble of league, cup and Champions League in 2010. Since the 2010–11 season, Faria was the assistant coach of Real Madrid, moving to the club along with Mourinho, Morais and Louro. Faria followed Mourinho back to Chelsea, when he was confirmed as the manager in June 2013.

He has worked alongside Mourinho since 2002, a period that had seen the manager and his staff fail to lose a league game at home in eight years, the run ending with a 0–1 defeat to Sporting de Gijón whilst with Real Madrid. Mourinho described Faria as his "methodology right arm, the guy that understands best my information and the way I work".

In April 2014, Faria was sent from the dugout by referee Mike Dean following the coach's aggressive behaviour to the official during Chelsea's home defeat to Sunderland. He was charged with using abusive and insulting words. He received a four-match stadium ban after appealing against a six-match ban.

Faria once again was appointed as Mourinho's assistant upon his appointment at Manchester United in 2016. In May 2018, Faria resigned as assistant manager of Manchester United to spend more time with his family, ending his 17 year partnership with Mourinho.

"The one that has more potential than any other one, the one that if he wants to become a manager tomorrow he is more than ready to do it at the highest level […] is my assistant, Rui Faria."

— Mourinho speaking on Faria in 2015.

On 18 January 2019, Faria was appointed manager of Qatar Stars League club Al-Duhail, his first full management position. He resigned from his role one year later.

== Controversy ==
As with his long-time manager, colleague and friend Mourinho, Faria has been the subject of controversy in the media. In a match against Reading in 2006, where Chelsea goalkeeper Petr Čech received a severe blow to the head, Faria was sent off alongside Chelsea midfielder Mikel John Obi.

In a 2005 Champions League quarter-final match against Bayern Munich, where Mourinho was suspended for Chelsea, Faria was seen wearing a woolly hat and scratching his ear enough to elicit suspicions that Mourinho was covertly communicating with his fitness coach.

At Real Madrid, Faria was said to have been party to an altercation with Sporting de Gijón manager Manuel Preciado after a match between the two clubs in November 2010.

In April 2014, Faria was dismissed from the Chelsea bench during the home defeat against Sunderland when he made comments to the fourth official complaining about a penalty that had been awarded to Sunderland. It was alleged he had used "abusive and/or insulting words". The match resulted in Chelsea's first-ever Premier League loss at Stamford Bridge under Mourinho.

== Personal life ==
Faria is married and is a father to three children.

== Honours ==
=== As assistant coach ===
As an assistant coach, including a sabbatical in 2007–08, Faria's club sides have won their domestic league eight times, the UEFA Cup / UEFA Europa League twice and the Champions League twice. Between 2002 and 2012, Mourinho and Faria did not go a full season or a calendar year without winning at least one trophy.

Porto

- 2002–03 Primeira Liga
- 2002–03 Taça de Portugal
- 2002–03 UEFA Cup
- 2003 Supertaça Cândido de Oliveira
- 2003–04 Primeira Liga
- 2003–04 UEFA Champions League

Chelsea

- 2004–05 FA Premier League
- 2004–05 League Cup
- 2005 FA Community Shield
- 2005–06 FA Premier League
- 2006–07 League Cup
- 2006–07 FA Cup

Internazionale

- 2008 Supercoppa Italiana
- 2008–09 Serie A
- 2009–10 Serie A
- 2009–10 Coppa Italia
- 2009–10 UEFA Champions League

Real Madrid

- 2010–11 Copa del Rey
- 2011–12 La Liga
- 2012 Supercopa de España

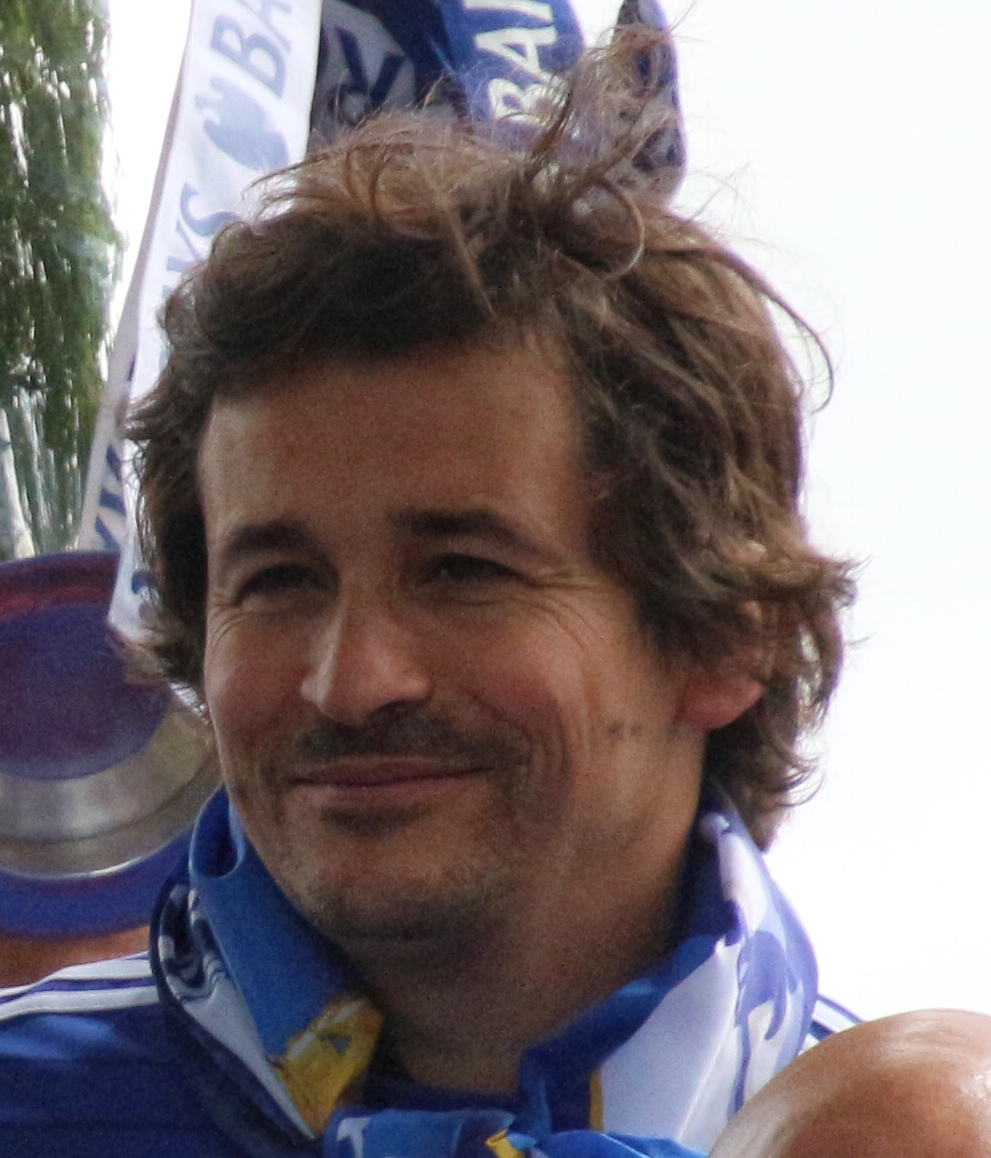
Faria on Chelsea's Premier League victory parade in May 2015

Chelsea

- 2014–15 League Cup
- 2014–15 Premier League

Manchester United

- 2016 FA Community Shield
- 2016–17 EFL Cup
- 2016–17 UEFA Europa League

The Treble (League, Cup and European trophies)

- 2002–03 with Porto: League, Cup and UEFA Cup
- 2009–10 with Inter Milan: League, Cup and UEFA Champions League

=== As head coach ===
Al-Duhail

- Qatar Emir Cup: 2019
