= Rica =

Rica may refer to:

== Organizations ==
- Rica Hotels, a chain of approx. 90 hotels located in Norway and Sweden, including:
  - Grand Hotel (Oslo)
  - Holmenkollen Park Hotel Rica
  - Rica Hotel, Kungsgatan
  - Rica Seilet Hotel (Molde)
  - Rica Talk Hotel (Älvsjö)

== People ==
- Doña Rica, otherwise known as Richeza of Poland, Queen of Castile
- Rica Erickson (born 1908), an Australian naturalist, botanical artist, historian, and author
- Rica Matsumoto (born 1968), a Japanese actress
- Rica Peralejo (born 1981), a Filipina actress, singer, and television host
- Vítor Riça (born 1974), Portuguese footballer
- Rui Riça (born 1978), Portuguese footballer

== Acronym (RICA) ==
- Regulation of Interception of Communications and Provision of Communication-related Information Act, 2002, a South African law regulating the interception of communications
- Regional Institute for Children and Adolescents, part of Montgomery County Public Schools (Maryland)
- Rupture of Intracranial aneurysm

== See also ==
- Costa Rica
- Rika (disambiguation)
