= List of Al Duhail SC managers =

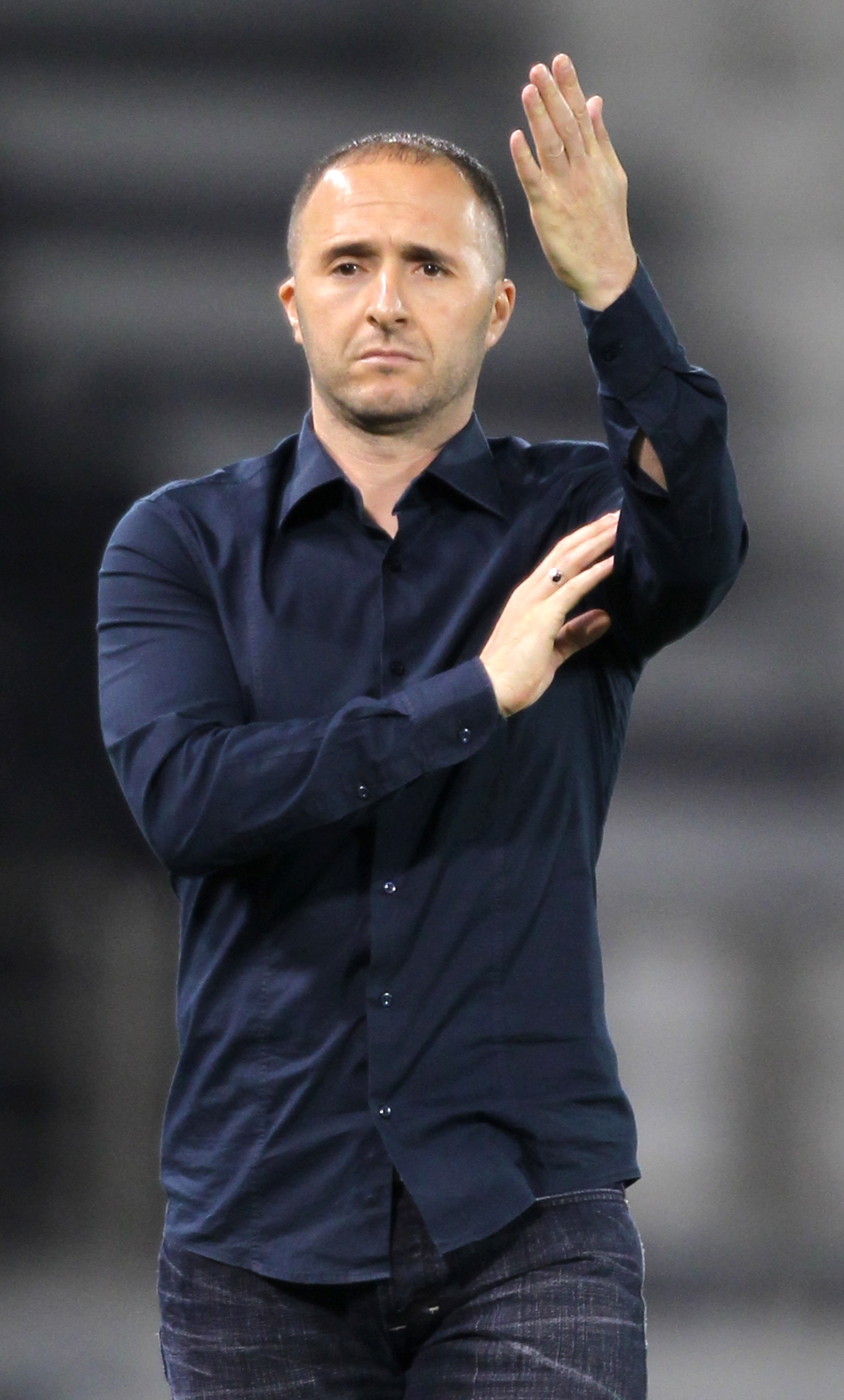
Djamel Belmadi who have achieved the most titles with Al Duhail SC and who have remained coach for a total of five years.

This is a list of all managers of Al Duhail SC. Current coach Luís Castro took over for Sabri Lamouchi on 10 August 2021.

== Background ==
In the summer of 2010, Djamel Belmadi was appointed as the head coach of newly promoted Qatar Stars League club Lekhwiya. In his first season with the club, he led them to the 2010–11 Qatar Stars League title for the first time in the club's history. He also led them to the final of the 2010 Sheikh Jassem Cup, where they lost to Al Arabi. For the second time, Lekhwiya won the 2011–12 Qatar Stars League title, under the management of Belmadi. He resigned on 8 October 2012 after a bad start of the 2012–13 season. On 30 June 2014, Michael Laudrup became the new manager of Qatar Stars League champions Lekhwiya after signing a one-year deal. Laudrup guided the Lekhwiya to a club-record Qatar Stars League and a Crown Prince Cup double in his first season. The club also qualified for the quarter-finals of the 2015 AFC Champions League during his reign. On 17 June 2015, Laudrup announced that he would not extend his contract, departing the club. On June 19, 2015, marks Belmadi's return to Lekhwiya. He replaces the former Danish international Michael Laudrup. During this transition season for Lekhwiya, on the national level (fourth in the league), the club is a finalist for the Crown Prince Cup but loses against El Jaish SC. The club won the Sheikh Jassim Cup that year, against Al Sadd SC, then the Qatar Cup against the same opponent but after extra time. This last victory allows him to qualify for the 2017 AFC Champions League. For the 2016–17 season, Lekhwiya therefore participates in the Champions League. Lekwiya was eliminated by Iranian club Persepolis in the round of 16. The club retained the Sheikh Jassim Cup against Al-Rayyan SC and then won the Qatar Stars League with a single defeat. 2017–18 will be Djamel Belmadi's last season. Within his club which changed its name to become Al-Duhail, he achieved a full house in the group stage of the 2018 AFC Champions League by winning all his matches in his group. His team will be eliminated in the Quarter-finals by Persepolis. Belmadi is again champion of Qatar (his team ends the season undefeated). He won two national cups (the Emir of Qatar Cup and the Crown Prince Cup). During these three years spent at Al-Duhail, Belmadi won 7 trophies out of a possible 12 and arrived 4 times as a finalist in national cups. After a long discussion with the leaders of Al-Duhail, Belmadi left the club and was replaced by Nabil Maâloul to be the new coach of Al-Duhail SC. He was also sacked after six months of coaching due to the club's unsuccessful performances in both national league and AFC Champions League. In October 2020, Sabri Lamouchi was appointed manager of Qatari side Al-Duhail. After 295 days in charge, Lamouchi decided to step down as manager of Al-Duhail.

== List of managers ==
Information correct as of 18 March 2022. Only competitive matches are counted.

Key
*	Caretaker manager

Name	From	To	Matches	Won	Drawn	Lost	GF	GA	GD	Win%
(Qatar) Abdullah Mubarak	2009	2010							+	100
(Algeria) Djamel Belmadi	1 July 2010	8 October 2012	42	27	9	6			+	64.29
(Belgium) Eric Gerets	9 October 2012	May 2014	77	44	13	20			+	57.14
(Denmark) Michael Laudrup	30 June 2014	17 June 2015	41	28	8	5	72	35	+37	68.29
(Algeria) Djamel Belmadi	19 January 2015	12 July 2018	104	72	15	17			+	69.23
(Tunisia) Nabil Maâloul	13 July 2018	5 January 2019	22	14	6	2			+	63.64
(Portugal) Rui Faria	18 January 2019	20 January 2020							+	100
(Morocco) Walid Regragui	January 2020	30 September 2020	17	11	1	5			+	64.71
(Tunisia) Hatem Almoadab ^{*}	1 October 2020	13 October 2020								
(France) Sabri Lamouchi	14 October 2020	9 August 2021	35	21	5	9	76	44	+32	60
(Portugal) Luís Castro	10 August 2021	18 March 2022	26	18	5	3	75	30	+45	69.23
(Argentina) Hernán Crespo	24 March 2022	Present							+	

== Trophies ==
#	Name	QSL	EQC	CPC	SJC	Total
1	(Algeria) Djamel Belmadi	4	2	1	2	9
2	(Belgium) Eric Gerets	1	-	1	-	2
2	(Denmark) Michael Laudrup	1	-	1	-	2
4	(Morocco) Walid Regragui	1	-	-	-	1
4	(Portugal) Rui Faria	-	1	-	-	1
