= 2002–03 in Portuguese football =

In the 2002–03 season, José Mourinho's Porto won the Primeira Liga, Taça de Portugal and the UEFA Cup.

== Winning roster ==
FC PORTO: Dmitri Alenichev, Bruno, Buszáky, Cândido Costa, Capucho, César Peixoto, Clayton, Costinha, Deco, Derlei, Elias, Hélder Postiga, Hugo Luz, Edgaras Jankauskas, Jorge Costa, Maniche, Marco Ferreira, Mário Silva, Nuno, Nuno Valente, Paulinho Santos, Pedro Emanuel, Reinaldo, Ricardo Carvalho, Ricardo Costa, Secretário, Tiago e Vítor Baía.

Manager: José Mourinho

== Primeira Liga ==
Pos	Team	Pld	W	D	L	GF	GA	GD	Pts	Qualification or relegation
1	Porto (C)	34	27	5	2	73	26	+47	86	Qualification to Champions League group stage
2	Benfica	34	23	6	5	74	27	+47	75	Qualification to Champions League third qualifying round
3	Sporting CP	34	17	8	9	52	38	+14	59	Qualification to UEFA Cup first round
4	Vitória de Guimarães	34	14	8	12	47	46	+1	50	
5	União de Leiria	34	13	10	11	49	47	+2	49	Qualification to UEFA Cup qualifying round (Note: Leiria qualified for the UEFA Cup as Portuguese Cup runners-up)
6	Paços de Ferreira	34	12	9	13	40	47	−7	45	
7	Marítimo	34	13	5	16	36	48	−12	44	
8	Gil Vicente	34	13	5	16	42	53	−11	44	
9	Belenenses	34	11	10	13	47	48	−1	43	
10	Boavista	34	10	13	11	32	31	+1	43	
11	Nacional	34	9	13	12	40	46	−6	40	
12	Moreirense	34	9	12	13	42	46	−4	39	
13	Beira-Mar	34	10	9	15	43	50	−7	39	
14	Braga	34	8	14	12	34	47	−13	38	
15	Académica	34	8	13	13	38	48	−10	37	
16	Varzim (R)	34	10	6	18	38	51	−13	36	Relegation to Segunda Liga
17	Santa Clara (R)	34	8	11	15	39	54	−15	35	Relegation to Segunda Liga
18	Vitória de Setúbal (R)	34	6	13	15	40	53	−13	31	Relegation to Segunda Liga

Source: Primeira Liga
Rules for classification: 1) points; 2) head-to-head points; 3) head-to-head goal difference; 4) goal difference; 5) number of goals scored
(C) Champions; (R) Relegated

== Taça de Portugal ==
=== Round of 16 to Final ===
Round of 16
1	Vitória Guimarães	1
1	FC Porto	2
1	Varzim SC	2
2	FC Felgueiras	0
1	Estrela da Amadora	0
1	Sporting CP	1
2B	Sporting Espinho	1 (2)
2	Naval 1º de Maio (PEN)	1 (4)
1	UD Leiria	5
2B	SC Freamunde	2
1	Académica	3
2	GD Chaves	1
1	FC Paços de Ferreira	-
-	bye	-
1	Vitória Setúbal	3
2	Sporting Covilhã	0

Quarter-Finals
1	FC Porto	7
1	Varzim SC	0
1	Sporting CP	0
2	Naval 1º de Maio	1
1	UD Leiria	3
1	Académica Coimbra	1
1	Paços de Ferreira	2
1	Vitória Setúbal	1

Semi-Finals
1	FC Porto	2
2	Naval 1º de Maio	0
1	UD Leiria	1
1	FC Paços de Ferreira	0

Final
1	FC Porto	1
1	UD Leiria	0

== Porto's UEFA Cup Run ==
Team 1	Agg.	Team 2	1st leg	2nd leg
Porto (Portugal)	6–2	(Poland) Polonia Warszawa	6–0	0–2
Austria Wien	0–3	(Portugal) Porto	0–1	0–2
Porto (Portugal)	3–1	(France) Lens	3–0	0–1
Porto (Portugal)	8–3	(Turkey) Denizlispor	6–1	2–2
Porto (Portugal)	2–1	(Greece) Panathinaikos	0–1	2–0(aet)
Porto (Portugal)	4–1	(Italy) Lazio	4–1	0–0

Final 21 May 2003
20:45 CET

Porto (Portugal)	3–2	(Scotland) Celtic
Derlei 45', 115'; Alenichev 54'	(Report)	Larsson 47', 57'

Estadio Olímpico de Sevilla, Seville
Attendance: 52,972
Referee: Ľuboš Micheľ (Slovakia)

== Supertaça Cândido de Oliveira ==
Held on 18 August, double-winners Sporting CP defeated cup runners-up Leixões 5–1. They completed a clean sweep of domestic honours for the calendar year of 2002.
