= Pedrinha =

Portuguese footballer

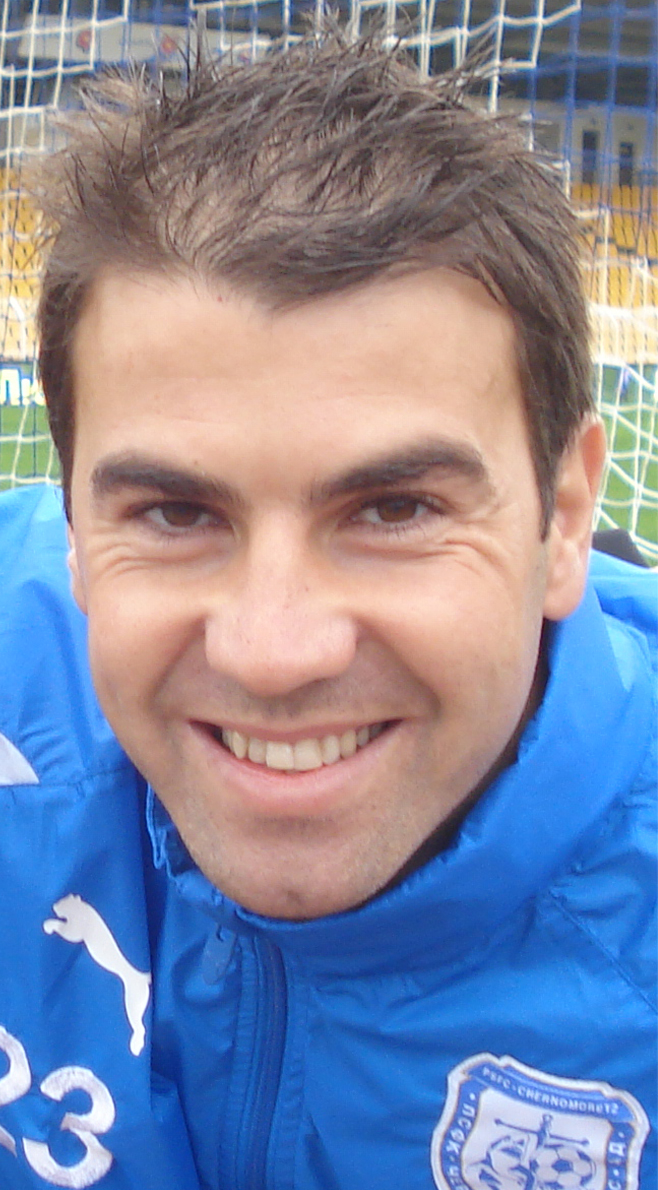
- Pedrinha as a Chernomorets player

Personal information
- Full name: Pedro Ricardo Marques Pereira Monteiro
- Date of birth: 3 May 1978 (age 48)
- Place of birth: Oliveira de Azeméis, Portugal
- Height: 1.79 m (5 ft 10 in)
- Position: Midfielder

Youth career
- 1992–1994: Feira Nova
- 1994–1996: Penafiel

Senior career*
Years	Team	Apps	(Gls)
1996–2001	Penafiel	110	(4)
2001–2010	Paços Ferreira	215	(15)
2010	Chernomorets	21	(4)
2011–2013	Penafiel	31	(0)
Total		377	(23)

International career
1998	Portugal U20	1	(0)
- * Club domestic league appearances and goals

Pedro Ricardo Marques Pereira Monteiro (born 3 May 1978), known as Pedrinha, is a Portuguese former professional footballer who played as a central midfielder.

He amassed Primeira Liga totals of 184 matches and 11 goals over eight seasons, all with Paços de Ferreira.

== Club career ==
Born in Oliveira de Azeméis, Porto metropolitan area, Pedrinha grew up in the ranks of F.C. Penafiel and made his debut as a senior in the Segunda Liga, switching in 2001 to F.C. Paços de Ferreira and making his first Primeira Liga appearance on 12 August of that year, against C.F. Os Belenenses. He was an instant first choice for his new club as well as their captain, enduring relegation at the end of the 2003–04 season but being promoted immediately after.

On 22 April 2009, Pedrinha scored twice – both from penalty kicks – in a 3–2 away win over C.D. Nacional in the second leg of the semi-finals of the Taça de Portugal (5–4 aggregate victory). During his career at Paços and two seasons at Penafiel, he partnered Paulo Sousa in central midfield.

On 26 January 2010, Bulgarian side PSFC Chernomorets Burgas signed Pedrinha to a two-year deal worth €180,000; "I hope he will lead the team into the heavy battles in the second half of the season", team manager Krassimir Balakov said upon his arrival. He made his debut two days later, in a 3–0 friendly win against PFC Nesebar.

Pedrinha was released by Chernomorets in December 2010, after Balakov resigned as head coach. In late June of the following year, the 33-year-old returned to his first professional club Penafiel, also in the second tier; after retiring, he became manager of the latter's reserves.
