= Paulo Vida =

Portuguese footballer

Personal information
- Full name: Paulo Jorge Vida Ribeiro
- Date of birth: 9 December 1971 (age 54)
- Place of birth: Lisbon, Portugal
- Position: Striker

Youth career
- Belenenses
- Odivelas
- Estrela da Amadora

Senior career*
Years	Team	Apps	(Gls)
1990-1991	Seixal	15	(1)
1991-1993	Odivelas		
1993-1994	Académica	20	(4)
1994-1995	Estoril	27	(5)
1995-1996	Aves	31	(21)
1996	Châteauroux	17	(1)
1997	Gil Vicente	20	(3)
1997-1998	União de Leiria	17	(2)
1998-1999	Penafiel	34	(19)
1999	União de Leiria	1	(0)
1999-2001	Paços de Ferreira	40	(17)
2001-2002	Campomaiorense	34	(19)
2002-2003	Varzim	33	(9)
2003	Paços de Ferreira	11	(0)
2004	Créteil	17	(5)
2004-2005	Dragões Sandinenses	25	(14)
2005-2006	Ribeirão	21	(3)
- * Club domestic league appearances and goals

Paulo Jorge Vida Ribeiro (born 9 December 1971) is a Portuguese former footballer who is last known to have played as a striker for Ribeirão.

== Career ==
In 1996, Vida signed for French second division side Châteauroux.

Vida was the top scorer of the 2002–03 Taça de Portugal with 5 goals.

== Honours ==
=== Club ===
União de Leiria

- Segunda Liga: 1997–98

Paços de Ferreira

- Segunda Liga: 1999–2000

=== Individual ===
- Segunda Liga Top Goalscorer: 1995–96, 2001–02 (Note: shared with Ibón Arrieta, Rômulo and Serginho)
- Taça de Portugal Top Goalscorer: 2002–03 Taça de Portugal
