= Tiago Pereira (footballer, born 1975) =

Portuguese footballer (born 1975)

Tiago
Personal information
- Full name: Tiago César Moreira Pereira
- Date of birth: 4 July 1975 (age 51)
- Place of birth: Trofa, Portugal
- Height: 1.73 m (5 ft 8 in)
- Position: Defensive midfielder

Youth career
- 1987–1992: Trofense

Senior career*
Years	Team	Apps	(Gls)
1992–1993	Trofense	17	(2)
1993–1995	Famalicão	43	(0)
1995−1997	Maritimo	36	(0)
1997−1998	Benfica	24	(1)
1998−1999	Rayo Vallecano	22	(1)
1999−2000	Tenerife	29	(0)
2000−2002	União Leiria	61	(2)
2002−2004	Porto	25	(1)
2004	→ União Leiria (loan)	17	(1)
2004−2007	Boavista	80	(1)
2007−2009	União Leiria	54	(0)
2009−2016	Trofense	223	(7)
Total		631	(16)

International career
1996	Portugal U21	2	(0)
- * Club domestic league appearances and goals

Tiago César Moreira Pereira (born 4 July 1975), known simply as Tiago (Portuguese pronunciation: [tiˈaɣu]), is a Portuguese former professional footballer who played as a defensive midfielder.

He amassed Primeira Liga totals of 282 matches and six goals over 12 seasons, mainly in representation of União de Leiria (five years) and Boavista (three). He started and ended his extensive career with Trofense.

== Club career ==
Born in Trofa, Porto District, tough-tackling Tiago started his professional career with F.C. Famalicão in 1993. He went on to represent in his country C.S. Marítimo, S.L. Benfica, U.D. Leiria, FC Porto (he won the 2002–03 UEFA Cup with the club while totalling 32 appearances in all competitions that season to claim a treble, and finished the following campaign on loan with Leiria) and Boavista FC.

In July 2007, the 32-year-old Tiago returned to União Leiria. Two years later, after being instrumental in their return to the Primeira Liga after one year out, only missing one game, he joined another team in the Segunda Liga, C.D. Trofense, which had just moved in the opposite direction. He remained in the second tier of Portuguese football with the latter side for several seasons, retiring at the age of 40.

Tiago also had abroad stints with Rayo Vallecano (1998–99) and CD Tenerife (1999–2000, both in the Spanish Segunda División), helping the Madrid club promote to La Liga by scoring once in the 4–0 aggregate win against CF Extremadura in the playoffs, 2–0 in the final leg.

== Honours ==
Porto

- Primeira Liga: 2002–03, 2003–04
- Taça de Portugal: 2002–03
- UEFA Cup: 2002–03

União Leiria

- UEFA Intertoto Cup: 2007
