= 2002–03 Taça de Portugal =

Tournament details
- Country: Portugal
- Dates: 8 September 2002 – 15 June 2003
- Teams: 226

Final positions
- Champions: Porto (12th title)
- Runners-up: União de Leiria

Tournament statistics
- Top goal scorer: Paulo Vida (5 goals)

The 2002–03 Taça de Portugal was the 63rd edition of the Portuguese football knockout tournament, organized by the Portuguese Football Federation (FPF). The 2002–03 Taça de Portugal began on 8 September 2002. The final was played on 15 June 2003 at the Estádio Nacional.

Sporting CP were the previous holders, having defeated Leixões 1–0 in the previous season's final. Defending champions Sporting CP were eliminated in the quarter-finals by second division Naval. Porto defeated União de Leiria, 1–0 in the final to win their twelfth Taça de Portugal. As a result of Dragões winning both the league and cup in the same season, União de Leiria would play in the 2003 Supertaça Cândido de Oliveira against their cup final opponents.

== Fourth round ==
All fourth round cup ties were between the 23 November and the 29 January. The fourth round saw teams from the Primeira Liga (I) enter the competition.

Home team	Score	Away team
Santa Clara (I)	4–0	Boavista (I)
Nacional (I)	1–1 (aet, p. 5–4)	Marítimo (I)
Pedras Rubras (III)	0–3	Gil Vicente (I)
Lusitânia	0–1	Vitória de Setúbal (I)
Benfica (I)	0–1	Gondomar (III)
Porto (I)	2–0	Trofense (IV)
Sporting CP (I)	4–1	Estarreja (IV)
Vitória de Guimarães (I)	4–0	Alverca (II)
Maia (II)	1–1 (aet, p. 3–4)	Braga (I)
Varzim (I)	4–1	Farense (II)
Olivais e Moscavide (III)	2–3	Académica de Coimbra (I)
União de Leiria (I)	3–1	Oriental (III)
Lourinhanense (IV)	0–2	Belenenses (I)
Moreirense (I)	2–1	Beneditense (IV)
Chaves (II)	2–1	Beira-Mar (I)

Home team	Score	Away team
Paços de Ferreira (I)	1–0	Ribeirão (IV)
Marco (II)	2–1	União da Madeira (II)
Ovarense (II)	0–2	Naval (II)
Penafiel (II)	1–2	Louletano (III)
Rio Ave (II)	2–0	Fátima (III)
Praiense (IV)	0–2	Sporting da Covilhã (II)
Sporting de Espinho (III)	3–0	Vilafranquense (III)
Freamunde (III)	3–1 (aet)	Estoril (III)
Sporting de Pombal (III)	3–3 (aet, p. 4–5)	União Micaelense (III)
Oliveira do Hospital (III)	2–1	Sintrense (IV)
Paredes (III)	3–2	Loures (IV)
Barreirense (III)	1–2 (aet)	Estrela da Amadora (II)
Odivelas (III)	1–2 (aet)	Felgueiras (II)
Joane (IV)	1–0	Leça (II)

== Fifth round ==
Ties were played between the 17 December and the 26 February. Due to the odd number of teams involved at this stage of the competition, Estrela da Amadora qualified for the sixth round due to having no opponent to face at this stage of the competition.

17 December 2002	Belenenses (I)	3–4	Varzim (I)	Estádio do Restelo, Lisbon
	Verona 5'; Carvalho 82' (o.g.); Tuck 90' (pen.)		Wilson 8' (o.g.); Vida 24', 50', 56'	Referee: Olegário Benquerença

18 December 2002	Académica de Coimbra (I)	4–1	União Micaelense (III)	Estádio Municipal de Tábua, Tábua
	Marinescu 25', 77'; Tonel 56'; Adriano 89'		Carlitos 86' (pen.)	Referee: Olegário Benquerença

18 December 2002	Chaves (II)	2–0	Nacional (I)	Estádio Municipal de Chaves, Chaves
	João Alves 79'; Riça 89'			Referee: Paulo Pereira

18 December 2002	Marco (II)	0–0 (a.e.t.) (1–4 p)	Sporting da Covilhã (II)	Estádio Municipal Marco de Canaveses, Marco de Canaveses
				Referee: Hernâni Duarte
	Penalties
	(penalty scored); Barbosa (penalty missed); Nauzet (penalty missed)		(penalty scored) (penalty scored) (penalty scored); (penalty scored) Piguita

18 December 2002	Naval (II)	0–0 (a.e.t.) (8–7 p)	Braga (I)	Estádio Municipal José Bento Pessoa, Figueira da Foz
				Referee: José Godinho
	Penalties
	Penalty scored		Penalty scored Penalty missed

18 December 2002	Paredes (III)	0–3	Vitória de Guimarães (I)	Estádio Municipal das Laranjeiras, Paredes
			Romeu 36'; Fangueiro 54', 60'	Referee: Mário Mendes

18 December 2002	Rio Ave (II)	0–2	Freamunde (III)	Estádio dos Arcos, Vila do Conde
			Viegas 19'; Denilson 41'	Referee: António Resende

18 December 2002	Santa Clara (I)	0–0 (a.e.t.) (2–4 p)	Sporting de Espinho (III)	Estádio de São Miguel, Ponta Delgada
				Referee: João Ferreira
	Penalties
	(penalty missed); João Pedro (penalty missed) (penalty scored) (penalty scored); Gábor (penalty missed)		(penalty scored) (penalty scored); (penalty missed) Álvaro (penalty scored); (penalty scored) Simões

18 December 2002	Sporting CP (I)	8–1	Oliveira do Hospital (III)	Estádio José Alvalade, Lisbon
	R. Fernandes 1', 84'; Kutuzov 12', 69', 88'; Ronaldo 13'; Barbosa 59', 90'		Alex 41'	Referee: António Taia

18 December 2002	União de Leiria (I)	4–1	Louletano (III)	Estádio Municipal da Marinha Grande, Marinha Grande
	Bilro 41'; Aguiar 50'; João Paulo 68'; Silas 90'		Tagro 37'	Referee: Elmano Santos

15 January 2003	Paços de Ferreira (I)	1–0	Gondomar (III)	Estádio da Mata Real, Paços de Ferreira
	Queirós 88'			Referee: Nuno Almeida

15 January 2003	Porto (I)	2–1	Gil Vicente (I)	Estádio das Antas, Porto
	Clayton 6'; Maniche 33'		Nunes 80'	Referee: Pedro Proença

12 February 2003	Felgueiras (II)	1–0	Moreirense (I)	Estádio Doutor Machado de Matos, Felgueiras
	Zézé 90'			Referee: Isidoro Rodrigues

26 February 2003	Vitória de Setúbal (I)	6–1	Joane (IV)	Estádio do Bonfim, Setúbal
	Pascal (x2); Henrique; Mário Carlos; Alcântara; Jorginho		Goal

== Sixth round ==
Ties were played between the 22 January to the 5 March.

Due to the odd number of teams involved at this stage of the competition, Paços de Ferreira qualified for the quarter-finals due to having no opponent to face at this stage of the competition.

22 January 2003	União de Leiria (I)	5–2	Freamunde (III)	Estádio Municipal da Marinha Grande, Leiria
	Douala 14'; Mixirica 54', 84'; Kibwey 65'; Maciel 89'		Mendes 83'; Brandão 85'	Referee: Mário Mendes

29 January 2003	Académica de Coimbra (I)	3–1	Chaves (II)	Estádio Cidade de Coimbra, Coimbra
	Fredy 16', 60'; Dário 73'		Isidro 89'	Referee: Hélio Santos

29 January 2003	Estrela da Amadora (II)	0–1	Sporting CP (I)	Estádio José Gomes, Amadora
			Jardel 48'	Referee: Bruno Paixão

29 January 2003	Sporting de Espinho (III)	1–1 (a.e.t.) (2–4 p)	Naval (II)	Estádio Comendador Manuel Violas, Espinho
	Artur Jorge 119' (pen.)		Baha 104' (pen.)	Referee: Carlos Xistra
	Penalties
	(penalty scored) (penalty scored) (penalty missed); Álvaro (penalty missed)		Penalty scored

29 January 2003	Vitória de Guimarães (I)	1–2	Porto (I)	Estádio Dr. Machado de Matos, Felgueiras
	Romeu 13'		J. Costa 67'; Derlei 73'	Referee: Pedro Henriques

26 February 2003	Varzim (I)	2–0 (a.e.t.)	Felgueiras (II)	Estádio do Varzim Sport Club, Póvoa de Varzim
	João Paulo 91'; Vida 98'

5 March 2003	Vitória de Setúbal (I)	3–0	Sporting da Covilhã (II)	Estádio do Bonfim, Setúbal
	Hugo Henrique 15', 37'; Rui Miguel 79'			Referee: Olegário Benquerença

== Quarter-finals ==
All quarter-final ties were played on the 8–9 March.

8 March 2003	Porto (I)	7–0	Varzim (I)	Estádio das Antas, Porto
	M. Ferreira 20', 30', 74'; Jankauskas 23'; Peixoto 67'; Clayton 81'; Nuno 90' (pen.)			Referee: Augusto Duarte

8 March 2003	União de Leiria (I)	3–1	Académica de Coimbra (I)	Estádio Municipal da Marinha Grande, Leiria
	H. Almeida 45'; Paulo Gomes 76'; Bilro 90'		Marinescu 71'	Referee: Martins dos Santos

9 March 2003	Paços de Ferreira (I)	2–1	Vitória de Setúbal (I)	Estádio da Mata Real, Paços de Ferreira
	Queirós 2'; Baiano 43'		Hugo Henrique 30'	Referee: Paulo Pereira

9 March 2003	Sporting CP (I)	0–1	Naval (II)	Estádio José Alvalade, Lisbon
			Costé 58'	Referee: António Costa

== Semi-finals ==
Ties were played on the 13–14 April.

13 April 2003	União de Leiria (I)	1–0	Paços de Ferreira (I)	Estádio Municipal da Marinha Grande, Leiria
	Bilro 90'			Referee: Pedro Proença

14 April 2003	Porto (I)	2–0	Naval (II)	Estádio das Antas, Porto
	Derlei 55'; Deco 80'			Referee: Lucílio Batista

== Final ==
15 June 2003
17:15 WEST

Porto	1–0	União de Leiria
Derlei 64'

Estádio Nacional, Oeiras
Attendance: 38,000
Referee: Pedro Henriques (Lisbon)
