= Rika, Jajce =

Rika
- Village
- Location within Bosnia and Herzegovina
- Coordinates: 44.316611°N 17.2723781°E
- Country: Bosnia and Herzegovina
- Entity: Federation of Bosnia and Herzegovina
- Canton: Central Bosnia
- Municipality: Jajce

Area
  - Total: 2.24 sq mi (5.81 km^{2})

Population (2013)
  - Total: 376
  - Density: 168/sq mi (64.7/km^{2})
- Time zone: UTC+1 (CET)
  - Summer (DST): UTC+2 (CEST)

Rika is a village in the municipality of Jajce, Bosnia and Herzegovina.

== Demographics ==
According to the 2013 census, its population was 376.

Ethnicity in 2013
Ethnicity	Number	Percentage
Croats	301	80.1%
Bosniaks	64	17.0%
Serbs	9	2.4%
other/undeclared	2	0.5%
Total	376	100%
