= Hasan Bagi-ye Rika =

Hasan Bagi-ye Rika حسن بگي ريکا
- Village
- Location within Iran
- Coordinates: 33°24′51″N 47°40′50″E
- Country: Iran
- Province: Lorestan
- County: Kuhdasht
- Bakhsh: Central
- Rural District: Kuhdasht-e Jonubi

Population (2006)
  - Total: 54
- Time zone: UTC+3:30 (IRST)
  - Summer (DST): UTC+4:30 (IRDT)

Hasan Bagi-ye Rika (Persian: حسن بگي ريکا, also Romanized as Ḩasan Bagī-ye Rīkā and Ḩasan Bakī-ye Rīkā; also known as Rīkā) is a village in Kuhdasht-e Jonubi Rural District, in the Central District of Kuhdasht County, Lorestan Province, Iran. At the 2006 census, its population was 54, in 10 families.
