= Paulo Sousa (footballer, born 1975) =

Portuguese footballer

Personal information
- Full name: José Paulo Sousa da Silva
- Date of birth: 13 May 1975 (age 51)
- Place of birth: Lousada, Portugal
- Height: 1.75 m (5 ft 9 in)
- Position: Defensive midfielder

Youth career
- 1985–1993: Freamunde

Senior career*
Years	Team	Apps	(Gls)
1993–1999	Freamunde		
1995–1996	→ Valonguense (loan)		
1999–2001	Penafiel	62	(2)
2001–2007	Paços Ferreira	171	(2)
2007	APOP	12	(1)
2008–2011	Paços Ferreira	33	(1)
- * Club domestic league appearances and goals

José Paulo Sousa da Silva (born 13 May 1975), known as Paulo Sousa, is a Portuguese former professional footballer who played mainly as a defensive midfielder.

== Club career ==
Sousa was born in Lousada, Porto District. During his career, he played for S.C. Freamunde, F.C. Penafiel and F.C. Paços de Ferreira, also having an unsuccessful spell with Cyprus' APOP Kinyras FC from August to December 2007, after which he returned to Paços and re-joined central midfield teammate Pedrinha, with whom he shared nine professional seasons.

In June 2011, after two injury-ravaged campaigns with Paços, Sousa retired from football at the age of 36, amassing Primeira Liga totals of 183 matches and three goals for the club. He made his debut in the top flight on 12 August 2001, playing the full 90 minutes in a 3–1 home win against C.F. Os Belenenses.
