= Marco Ferreira =

Marco Ferreira may refer to:

- Marco Ferreira (footballer)
- Marco Ferreira (volleyball)
- Marco Ferreira (rugby union)
