= Derlei =

Brazilian footballer (born 1975)

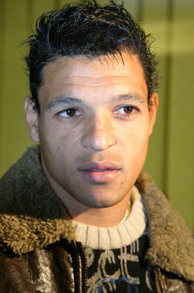
- Derlei in 2005

Personal information
- Full name: Vanderlei Fernandes Silva
- Date of birth: 14 July 1975 (age 51)
- Place of birth: São Bernardo do Campo, Brazil
- Height: 1.75 m (5 ft 9 in)
- Position: Striker

Senior career*
Years	Team	Apps	(Gls)
1994–1997	América-RN	56	(21)
1997–1998	Guarani	25	(7)
1999	Madureira	14	(4)
1999–2002	União Leiria	91	(42)
2002–2005	Porto	57	(19)
2005–2007	Dynamo Moscow	41	(20)
2007	→ Benfica (loan)	12	(1)
2007–2009	Sporting CP	27	(8)
2009–2010	Vitória	1	(1)
2010	Madureira	3	(1)
Total		327	(124)
- * Club domestic league appearances and goals

Vanderlei Fernandes Silva (born 14 July 1975), known as Derlei, is a Brazilian former professional footballer who played as a striker.

He spent most of his 16-year professional career in Portugal (one full decade), having represented all three most important clubs in the country and amassing Primeira Liga totals of 187 matches and 70 goals. He also played two seasons with Dynamo Moscow in the Russian Premier League.

With Porto, Derlei won eight major titles including two leagues, one Champions League and one UEFA Cup.

== Club career ==
=== Early career ===
Born in São Bernardo do Campo, São Paulo, Derlei began playing in the lower levels of Brazilian football, but joined Portugal's União Leiria in 1999, going on to appear in 92 competitive games for the club. In his last season, as they overachieved for a final seventh place in the Primeira Liga led by young manager José Mourinho, he scored 21 goals.

=== Porto and Dynamo ===
Derlei signed with Porto in the summer of 2002, playing an important part in a successful squad that was also managed by Mourinho, and being nicknamed "Ninja" while playing for the northern side. In his second game on 2 September, a 1–0 local derby victory at Boavista, he was sent off for fighting with his compatriot and former Leiria teammate, Éder Gaúcho; he was suspended for two games and his opponent for one. He was the top scorer of the 2002–03 UEFA Cup with 12 goals in 13 games; this tally included two in the 3–2 final win against Celtic to overtake opponent Henrik Larsson, as well as braces in the preceding rounds against Panathinaikos and Lazio.

In the 2003–04 Primeira Liga, Derlei was leading the domestic goalscoring chart, including a hat-trick on 5 October in a 4–1 home win over Académica de Coimbra, but suffered a right knee anterior cruciate ligament injury against Alverca on 22 December, initially being ruled out for the rest of the season by the club's doctor. He recovered to face the same team on 25 April, and on 5 May he scored a penalty for the only goal of the UEFA Champions League semi-final away to Deportivo La Coruña, as his team eventually lifted the title.

In January 2005, after disciplinary problems related to delay in his return from the winter break, Derlei was sold to Dynamo Moscow for €7 million. After two years in Russian football where he was always one of the top five scorers, he moved to Benfica on loan in January 2007. He played his first league match for the latter on 2 February, coming on as a second-half substitute in a 0–0 home draw with Boavista; his only goal in 16 appearances opened a 2–0 win over Académica on the final day of the season at the Estádio da Luz.

=== Sporting ===
Derlei left for Lisbon rivals Sporting CP in late June 2007, signing a one-year deal with the option for another after being freed from his two-year contract with Dynamo Moscow – he was, therefore, one of the few players to have represented the Big Three of Portugal. He spent most of 2007–08 on the sidelines, with another serious knee injury.

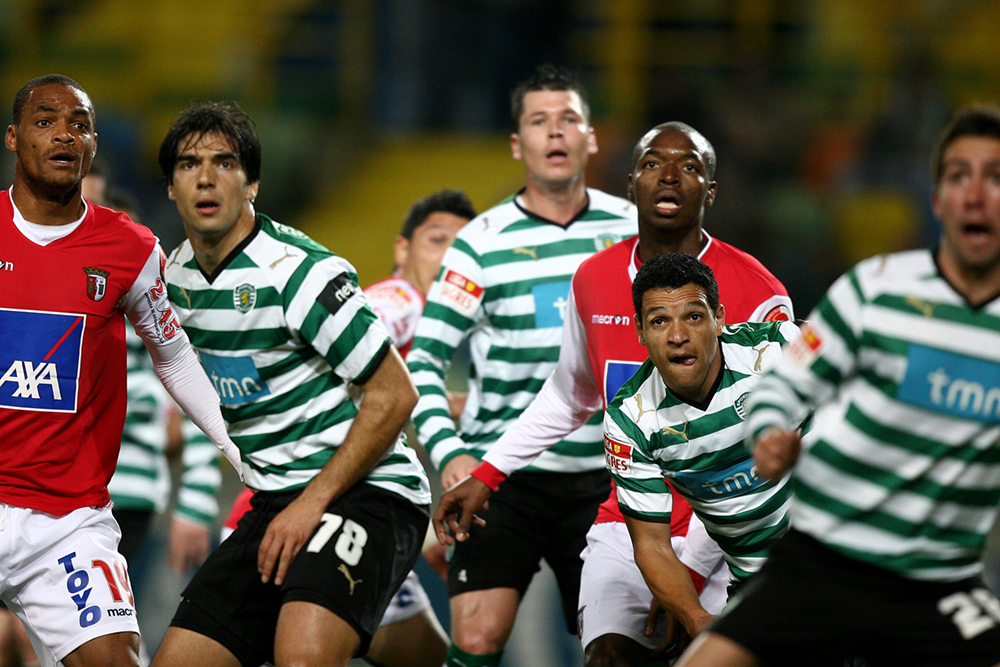
Derlei (second from the right) playing for Sporting CP against Braga in February 2009

Derlei made a comeback to competition when, on 16 April 2008, he entered the field for Leandro Romagnoli in the 61st minute during the semi-final of the Taça de Portugal against Benfica, scoring only 18 minutes later to make it 3–2 to Sporting, in a match which eventually ended with a 5–3 win as the team went on to win the tournament against another former acquaintance of the player, Porto.

In his second season, Derlei fought with Hélder Postiga for a chance to play alongside Liédson, and scored some goals including an important one in a 1–0 home victory over Shaktar Donetsk in the Champions League, which sealed Sporting's group stage qualification on 4 November 2008. At the end of the campaign, he declined the club's offer for a contract extension on the grounds the compensation was insufficient, thus being made a free agent.

=== Return to Brazil ===
On 27 August 2009, 34-year-old Derlei joined Vitória on a one-year deal. He made his competitive debut on 13 September in a match against Campeonato Brasileiro Série A leaders Palmeiras; having taken the pitch in the second half, he scored the 3–2 winner;

Derlei transferred to modest Madureira shortly after, returning to a team he had represented more than one decade prior.

== International career ==
After winning the UEFA Cup with Porto in 2003, Derlei was called up to represent Brazil at that year's Confederations Cup, which several of the team's regulars had declined. He turned down the offer as it required for him to sign up to a company.

Derlei then began the process of acquiring Portuguese nationality in the aim of representing their national side on home soil at UEFA Euro 2004, but injury allowed his former clubmate Postiga to cement a place instead. His citizenship was confirmed that August, after the tournament, but he was never called up.

== Career statistics ==
Appearances and goals by club, season and competition
Club	Season	League			National cup (Note: Includes Taça de Portugal, Russian Cup)		League cup (Note: Includes Taça da Liga)		Europe		Other		Total	
Club	Season	Division	Apps	Goals	Apps	Goals	Apps	Goals	Apps	Goals	Apps	Goals	Apps	Goals
União Leiria	1999–2000	Primeira Liga	26	8			–		–		–		26	8
União Leiria	2000–01	Primeira Liga	32	13			–		–		–		32	13
União Leiria	2001–02	Primeira Liga	33	21	1	0	–		–		–		34	21
União Leiria	Total		91	42	1	0	–		–		–		92	42
Porto	2002–03	Primeira Liga	26	7	1	1	–		13 (Note: Appearances in UEFA Cup)	12	–		40	20
Porto	2003–04	Primeira Liga	18	12	1	1	–		8 (Note: Appearances in UEFA Champions League)	3	2 (Note: One appearance in Supertaça Cândido de Oliveira, one appearance in UEFA Super Cup)	0	29	16
Porto	2004–05	Primeira Liga	13	0	0	0	–		5	0	0	0	18	0
Porto	Total		57	19	2	2	–		26	15	2	0	87	36
Dynamo Moscow	2005	Russian Premier League	18	13	0	0	–		–		–		18	13
Dynamo Moscow	2006	Russian Premier League	15	11	2	0	–		–		–		15	11
Dynamo Moscow	Total		33	24	2	0	–		–		–		33	24
Benfica	2006–07	Primeira Liga	12	1	0	0	–		6	0	–		18	1
Sporting	2007–08	Primeira Liga	4	1	2	1	0	0	0	0	1 (Note: Appearance in Supertaça Cândido de Oliveira)	0	7	2
Sporting	2008–09	Primeira Liga	20	5	0	0	1	2	7	2	1	0	29	9
Sporting	Total		24	6	2	1	1	2	7	2	2	0	36	11
Career total			218	92	7	3	1	2	39	17	4	0	272	114

== Honours ==
América-RN

- Campeonato Potiguar: 1996

Porto

- Primeira Liga: 2002–03, 2003–04
- Taça de Portugal: 2002–03
- Supertaça Cândido de Oliveira: 2003, 2004
- UEFA Champions League: 2003–04
- UEFA Cup: 2002–03
- Intercontinental Cup: 2004

Sporting

- Taça de Portugal: 2007–08
- Supertaça Cândido de Oliveira: 2007, 2008
- Taça da Liga runner-up: 2007–08, 2008–09

Individual

- UEFA Cup Top Scorer: 2002–03
- SJPF Player of the Month: October 2004
