= Hugo Henrique =

Brazilian footballer

Personal information
- Full name: Hugo Henrique Arantes Castro da Silva
- Date of birth: May 18, 1975 (age 51)
- Place of birth: Cabo de Santo Agostinho, Brazil
- Height: 1.83 m (6 ft 0 in)
- Position: Striker

Senior career*
Years	Team	Apps	(Gls)
1994–1997	Santa Cruz		
1998	Sergipe		
1999	Confiança		
1999–2001	Rio Ave	66	(32)
2001–2004	Vitória Setúbal	61	(22)
2004	→ Belenenses (loan)	13	(5)
2004–2007	Santa Clara	61	(25)
2008	Vitória		
2008	Sergipe		
2008	CRB		
2008	Treze		
2009	Sergipe		
2009–2010	Confiança		
2010	Sergipe		
2011	Salgueiro	1	(0)
2012	Lagarto		
2012	Coruripe		
- * Club domestic league appearances and goals

Hugo Henrique Arantes Castro da Silva (born 18 May 1977 in Cabo de Santo Agostinho), simply as Hugo Henrique, is a former Brazilian footballer who played as a striker.

== Career ==
Hugo Henrique played indoor football as a youth, but began playing senior football with Santa Cruz. He left for Sergipe in 1998, before signing a three-year contract with Portugal side Rio Ave in 1999. Hugo Henrique was a prolific goal-scorer for Rio Ave, scoring 36 times in league and cup competitions over two seasons with the club. He continued this good form with Vitória Setúbal, scoring twice in his debut.
