= Hélder Postiga =

Portuguese footballer (born 1982)

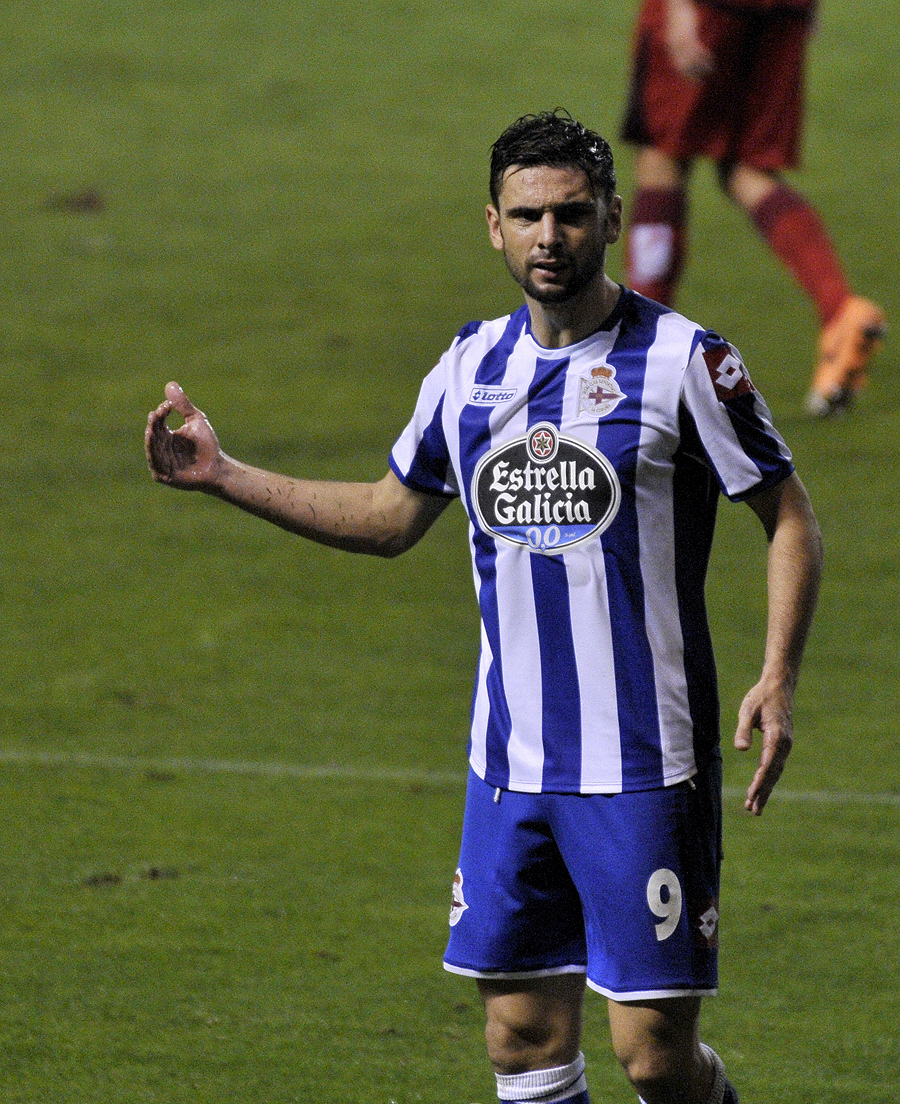
- Postiga with Deportivo in 2014

Personal information
- Full name: Hélder Manuel Marques Postiga
- Date of birth: 2 August 1982 (age 44)
- Place of birth: Vila do Conde, Portugal
- Height: 1.82 m (6 ft 0 in)
- Position: Striker

Youth career
- 1992–1995: Varzim
- 1995–2000: Porto

Senior career*
Years	Team	Apps	(Gls)
2000–2001	Porto B	37	(10)
2001–2003	Porto	58	(22)
2003–2004	Tottenham Hotspur	19	(1)
2004–2008	Porto	56	(15)
2006	→ Saint-Étienne (loan)	16	(2)
2008	→ Panathinaikos (loan)	11	(2)
2008–2011	Sporting CP	71	(12)
2011–2013	Zaragoza	70	(23)
2013–2014	Valencia	15	(3)
2014	→ Lazio (loan)	5	(0)
2014–2015	Deportivo La Coruña	14	(1)
2015	Atlético Kolkata	1	(2)
2016	Rio Ave	10	(5)
2016	Atlético Kolkata	11	(2)
Total		394	(100)

International career
2001–2003	Portugal U21	16	(12)
2002	Portugal B	2	(1)
2003–2014	Portugal	71	(27)
Medal record
Men's football
Representing Portugal
UEFA European Championship
Runner-up	2004 Portugal
Bronze medal – third place	2012 Poland-Ukraine
- * Club domestic league appearances and goals

Hélder Manuel Marques Postiga OIH (Portuguese pronunciation: [ˈɛldɛɾ puʃˈtiɣɐ]; born 2 August 1982) is a Portuguese former professional footballer who played as a striker.

After beginning at Porto, where he won eight items of silverware along the way, he amassed Primeira Liga totals of 195 games and 54 goals over 11 seasons, with that club, Sporting CP and Rio Ave. He also played in six foreign countries, most notably in Spain where he totalled 27 goals in 99 La Liga matches for three teams.

A Portugal international since 2003, Postiga represented the country in two World Cups and three European Championships, helping the nation to reach the final at Euro 2004.

== Club career ==
=== Porto ===
Born in Vila do Conde, Postiga began his career at nearby Varzim. In 1995, he joined Porto's youth system and continued to progress until he reached the reserve squad. At the time, coach Octávio Machado picked him for the first team on some occasions and the player performed well.

After José Mourinho was hired as manager, Postiga became a first-team regular. The 20-year-old scored 19 times in 2002–03, playing alongside Derlei as Porto won the treble. This included 13 in a victorious league run as well as five in an eventual conquest of the UEFA Cup, although he missed the final due to suspension. Following his successful season, he made his senior international debut for Portugal.

=== Tottenham Hotspur ===
On 25 June 2003, Postiga moved to Premier League club Tottenham Hotspur for £6.25 million (€9 million), a fee that could have risen to £8.36 million (€12 million). He signed a five-year contract, with manager Glenn Hoddle remarking: "He is a player who will add definite striking quality to our squad and is a young player of proven ability. I'm sure our supporters will enjoy watching him over the coming seasons."

Postiga made his debut on 16 August 2003 in a 1–0 away defeat to Birmingham City, starting but being replaced by fellow new signing Bobby Zamora after 57 minutes. His first goal came on 3 December, the second of a 3–1 home win against Manchester City in the round of 16 of the League Cup, while his only in the league contributed to a 2–1 victory over Liverpool on 17 January 2004, also at White Hart Lane.

=== Porto return ===
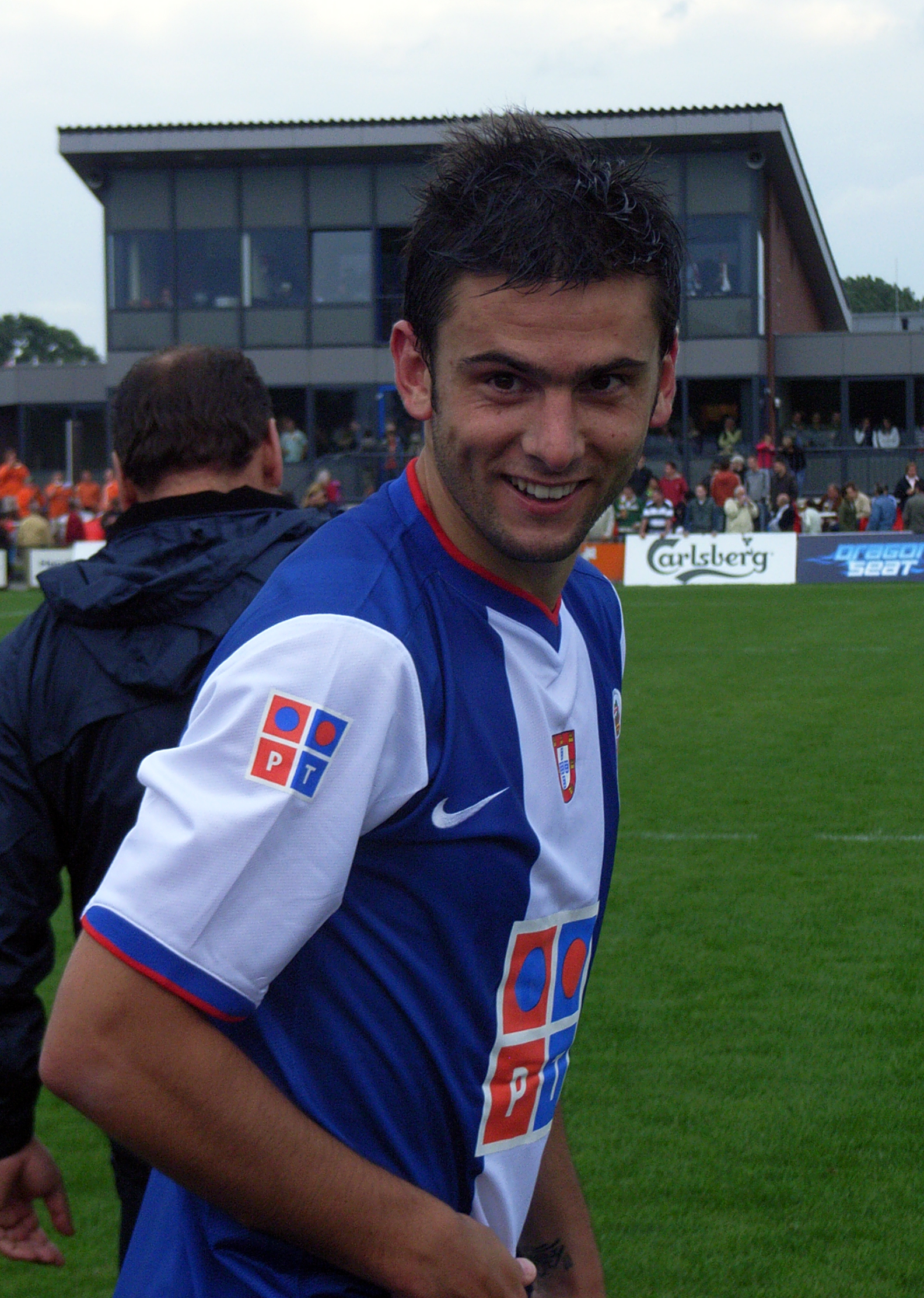
Postiga playing for Porto in 2007

In summer 2004, Postiga returned to Porto in a deal that sent Pedro Mendes in the other direction, with the striker being valued at €7.5 million. New coach Víctor Fernández included him in the team for the upcoming campaign, but he had another disappointing year; however, following José Couceiro's appointment as manager, he managed to score three goals.

In 2005, after a promising preseason, Postiga was demoted to the B team as Co Adriaanse was not happy with his performances. In January of the following year, trying to earn a place in the 2006 World Cup, he moved on loan to Saint-Étienne, where he netted twice in Ligue 1, against Metz and Le Mans, both resulting in 1–0 away wins.

Back at Porto for 2006–07, Postiga found himself back in the main squad due to a managerial change. A regular starter in the beginning, he nonetheless fell out of favour towards the end of the season, losing his place to Brazilian Adriano though he still managed to score 11 league goals; in his two spells, he appeared in 165 games in all competitions and netted 48 times.

In mid-January 2008, after having again fallen out of favour, Postiga moved to Panathinaikos on a six-month loan. His first goal for the club came in the Athens derby against AEK Athens, in which he equalised (1–1).

=== Sporting CP ===
On 1 June 2008, Postiga moved to Portuguese rivals Sporting CP, signing a three-year contract for a reported transfer fee of €2.5 million, with the Lisbon side acquiring 50% of the player's rights. He scored his first official goal for his new club on 1 September, the only in a victory at Braga.

Postiga's second season as a Lion was disastrous, both collectively – Sporting finished fourth – and individually (he only found the net on 19 April 2010, closing the 2–1 home win over Vitória de Setúbal after just one minute on the pitch); although he began as a starter, he soon lost his job to youth graduate Carlos Saleiro.

=== Zaragoza ===
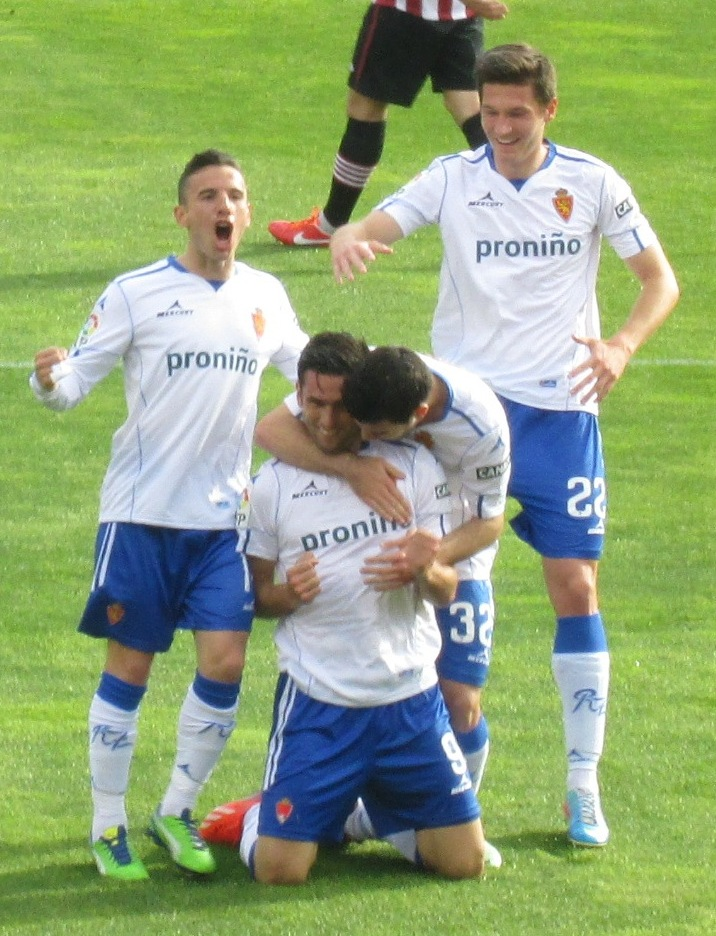
Postiga (kneeling) celebrating a goal against Athletic Bilbao

On 31 August 2011, the last day of the summer transfer window, Postiga joined Real Zaragoza of La Liga for €1 million. At the Spanish side, he reunited with his compatriots Fernando Meira and Rúben Micael.

After three disallowed goals in as many matches, Postiga opened his scoring account on 16 October 2011, netting twice in a 2–0 home defeat of Real Sociedad; this included a bicycle kick in the 11th minute of the game. He finished the season as club top scorer, in an eventual narrow escape from relegation.

On 10 November 2012, Postiga scored a brace to help the Aragonese to a 5–3 defeat of ten-men Deportivo de La Coruña. He scored a career-best 14 goals during the campaign, but his team was relegated.

=== Valencia ===
On 8 August 2013, Postiga joined Valencia for a fee of £2.6 million, replacing Tottenham-bound Roberto Soldado. On 1 September, in only the third match of the season, he netted twice late into the first half of the game against Barcelona at the Mestalla Stadium, but in an eventual 2–3 home loss.

Postiga was loaned to Lazio for the remainder of the campaign on 30 January 2014, with the option of a permanent move afterwards. He made his debut in Serie A on 26 March, playing 20 minutes in a 2–0 away defeat to Genoa.

=== Deportivo ===
On 1 September 2014, Postiga terminated his link with Valencia, and subsequently signed a one-year deal with fellow top-division team Deportivo. He made his competitive debut two weeks later, featuring the full 90 minutes of a 1–0 win at Eibar. His first goal for the Galicians came in his fifth match on 31 October: coming on at half-time for Luis Fariña, he scored a consolation in a 1–2 home loss to Getafe. A week later, he was sent off in the 29th minute of a goalless draw at Córdoba, earning a second yellow card for a reaction when fouled by Íñigo López.

Postiga spent the better part of the season injured, as Depor went on to narrowly avoid relegation.

=== Atlético Kolkata ===
On 29 July 2015, Postiga signed as the marquee player of Indian Super League franchise Atlético de Kolkata; at 32, he was the youngest such player in the competition, and was deemed by the management to be less injury-prone than his predecessor Luis García. He made his debut on 3 October in the opening game of the season, scoring twice in a 3–2 win at Chennaiyin but leaving with an injury. He made no further appearances, as they went on to be eliminated by precisely that opponent in the play-off semi-finals.

=== Rio Ave ===
On 1 February 2016, Postiga returned to his homeland, signing for top-flight Rio Ave until the end of the season. In his second match, 26 days later, he opened a 2–1 away victory over Boavista which was his 50th goal in the division.

On 14 May 2016, in the last fixture, Postiga scored the winning goal as his team won 2–1 at União da Madeira, qualifying for the Europa League and relegating their opponents.

=== Return to Kolkata ===
On 12 August 2016, Postiga returned to Atlético Kolkata as their marquee player. Early in his second match of the season, away to Kerala Blasters on 5 October, he suffered another long-term injury; the club's ownership admitted that due to such concerns they had wanted a different figurehead.

Postiga returned to the lineups and the side eventually won the championship, although he was substituted in the final.

== International career ==
"Hélder is one of the most promising youngsters I've seen in Europe."

— Luiz Felipe Scolari, June 2003

Postiga earned the first of his 71 caps for the Portugal national team (27 goals) on 12 February 2003 in a friendly with Italy, where he came on as a substitute for Tiago Mendes in the 70th minute – this game was also Luiz Felipe Scolari's first as manager. He was handed his first start on 10 June in the 4–0 win over Bolivia, where he scored his first two international goals.

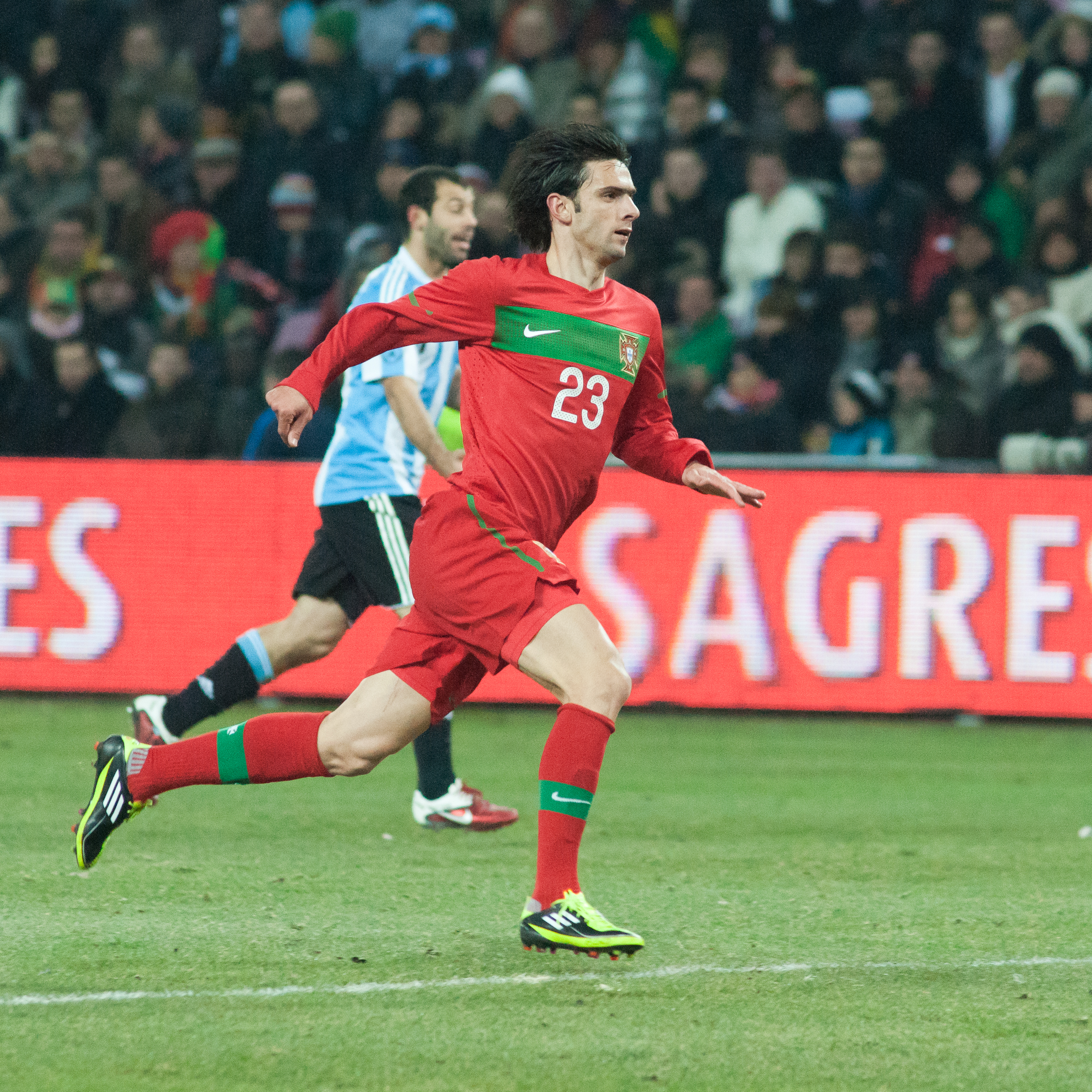
Postiga in action for Portugal in a friendly against Argentina on 9 February 2011

Even though he had arguably a poor year with Tottenham, Postiga was selected for UEFA Euro 2004. In the tournament, he managed to save his team from defeat against England during the quarter-finals, netting an 83rd-minute equaliser to level the score at 1–1 as Portugal would prevail in the penalty shootout 6–5 after a 2–2 draw. He converted his attempt with a "Panenka-style" shot, but did not feature in the final, lost 1–0 to outsiders Greece.

Postiga was included in the 2006 FIFA World Cup squad, starting against Mexico in a 2–1 win at the end of the group phase. In the quarter-finals, after replacing captain Luís Figo, he again scored to eliminate England on penalties, as the nation eventually finished fourth.

In Euro 2008, Postiga was also mainly used from the bench. In the quarter-finals against Germany, he scored a late goal by heading in a cross from fellow replacement Nani, although Portugal lost 3–2.

After more than two years of absence from the national team setup, Postiga was called up for two Euro 2012 qualifiers with Denmark and Iceland, in October 2010. On 12 October, against the latter, he netted in a 3–1 away victory. On 17 November, he put two past world champions Spain in a 4–0 friendly win in Lisbon.

On 4 June 2011, Postiga scored the only goal in a Euro 2012 qualifier against Norway played at Estádio da Luz, which made him the tenth highest scorer in Portugal's history. He added a brace on 15 November that year, in a 6–2 play-off second leg defeat of Bosnia and Herzegovina which secured a place in the competition.

Picked by Paulo Bento for the finals in Poland and Ukraine as first-choice striker, Postiga scored in the group-stage fixture against Denmark, the second in an eventual 3–2 win. He injured his right thigh in the first half of the national side's 1–0 quarter-final victory over the Czech Republic, being sidelined for the rest of the tournament.

Postiga scored six goals in the qualification campaign for the 2014 World Cup. On 6 September 2013, he was sent off in the first half of a 3–2 win in Northern Ireland for headbutting Gareth McAuley; at the finals, he started the second game against the United States after an injury to Hugo Almeida in the opener, but was himself substituted 16 minutes later due to physical problems as Portugal were eliminated in the group stage.

== Personal life ==
A childhood fan of Benfica who went on to play for their two main rivals, Postiga grew up in the Caxinas fishing neighbourhood of Vila do Conde, as did his long-time international teammates Bruno Alves and Fábio Coentrão.

Postiga's younger brother, José, was also a footballer and a forward. He played youth football at Sporting.

== Career statistics ==
=== Club ===
Appearances and goals by club, season and competition
Club	Season	League			National cup		League cup		Continental		Other		Total	
Club	Season	Division	Apps	Goals	Apps	Goals	Apps	Goals	Apps	Goals	Apps	Goals	Apps	Goals
Porto	2001–02	Primeira Liga	27	9	3	3	—		10 (Note: Appearances in UEFA Champions League)	1	—		40	13
Porto	2002–03	Primeira Liga	31	13	3	0	—		13 (Note: Appearances in UEFA Cup)	5	—		47	18
Porto	Total		58	22	6	3	—		23	6	—		87	31
Tottenham Hotspur	2003–04	Premier League	19	1	2	0	3	1	—		—		24	2
Porto	2004–05	Primeira Liga	24	3	1	0	—		7	0	1 (Note: Appearance in UEFA Super Cup)	0	23	3
Porto	2005–06	Primeira Liga	2	0	0	0	—		0	0	—		2	0
Porto	2006–07	Primeira Liga	24	11	0	0	—		7	1	—		31	12
Porto	2007–08	Primeira Liga	6	1	1	1	0	0	4	0	—		11	2
Porto	Total		56	15	2	1	0	0	18	1	1	0	77	17
Saint-Étienne (loan)	2005–06	Ligue 1	16	2	0	0	0	0	—		—		16	2
Panathinaikos (loan)	2007–08	Super League Greece	11	2	1	0	—		2	0	3 (Note: Appearances in Super League Greece playoffs)	0	17	2
Sporting CP	2008–09	Primeira Liga	21	5	2	0	3	0	5	0	1 (Note: Appearance in Supertaça Cândido de Oliveira)	0	32	5
Sporting CP	2009–10	Primeira Liga	22	1	1	0	2	0	7 (Note: Appearances in UEFA Champions League and UEFA Europa League)	0	—		32	1
Sporting CP	2010–11	Primeira Liga	25	6	2	0	3	1	12 (Note: Appearances in UEFA Europa League)	4	—		42	11
Sporting CP	2011–12	Primeira Liga	3	0	0	0	0	0	2	0	—		5	0
Sporting CP	Total		71	12	5	0	8	1	26	4	1	0	111	18
Zaragoza	2011–12	La Liga	33	9	1	0	—		—		—		34	9
Zaragoza	2012–13	La Liga	37	14	4	0	—		—		—		41	14
Zaragoza	Total		70	23	5	0	—		—		—		75	23
Valencia	2013–14	La Liga	15	3	3	1	—		5	0	—		23	4
Lazio (loan)	2013–14	Serie A	5	0	0	0	—		—		—		5	0
Deportivo La Coruña	2014–15	La Liga	14	1	2	1	—		—		—		16	2
Atlético Kolkata	2015	Indian Super League	1	2	—		—		—		—		1	2
Rio Ave	2015–16	Primeira Liga	10	5	1	0	—		—		—		11	5
Atlético Kolkata	2016	Indian Super League	11	2	—		—		—		—		11	2
Career total			357	90	27	6	11	2	74	11	5	0	474	109

=== International ===
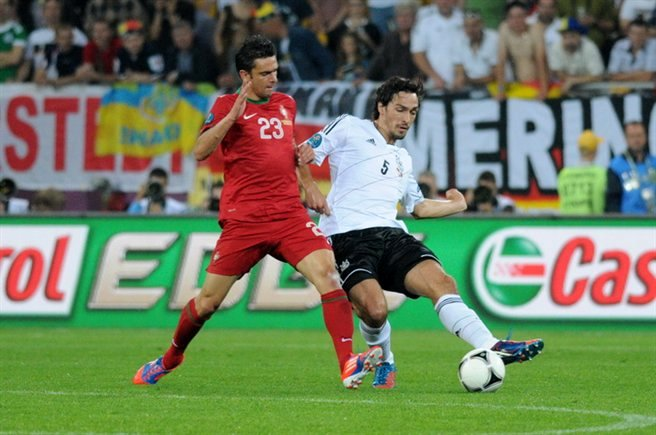
Postiga taking on Germany's Mats Hummels at Euro 2012

Appearances and goals by national team and year
National team	Year	Apps	Goals
Portugal	2003	4	2
Portugal	2004	7	4
Portugal	2005	10	3
Portugal	2006	6	0
Portugal	2007	4	1
Portugal	2008	3	1
Portugal	2009	0	0
Portugal	2010	3	3
Portugal	2011	9	5
Portugal	2012	11	4
Portugal	2013	9	4
Portugal	2014	5	0
Total		71	27

Scores and results list Portugal's goal tally first, score column indicates score after each Postiga goal.

List of international goals scored by Hélder Postiga
No.	Date	Venue	Opponent	Score	Result	Competition
1	10 June 2003	Estádio Nacional, Oeiras Municipality, Portugal	Bolivia	3–0	4–0	Friendly
2	10 June 2003	Estádio Nacional, Oeiras Municipality, Portugal	Bolivia	4–0	4–0	Friendly
3	5 June 2004	Estádio do Bonfim, Setúbal, Portugal	Lithuania	4–1	4–1	Friendly
4	24 June 2004	Estádio da Luz, Lisbon, Portugal	England	1–1	2–2	UEFA Euro 2004
5	8 September 2004	Estádio Dr. Magalhães Pessoa, Leiria, Portugal	Estonia	2–0	4–0	2006 World Cup qualification
6	8 September 2004	Estádio Dr. Magalhães Pessoa, Leiria, Portugal	Estonia	4–0	4–0	2006 World Cup qualification
7	26 March 2005	Estádio Cidade de Barcelos, Barcelos Municipality, Portugal	Canada	3–0	4–1	Friendly
8	30 March 2005	Tehelné pole, Bratislava, Slovakia	Slovakia	1–1	1–1	2006 World Cup qualification
9	17 August 2005	Estádio de São Miguel (Ponta Delgada), Ponta Delgada Municipality, Portugal	Egypt	2–0	2–0	Friendly
10	2 June 2007	King Baudouin Stadium, Brussels, Belgium	Belgium	2–1	2–1	UEFA Euro 2008 qualifying
11	19 June 2008	St. Jakob-Park, Basel, Switzerland	Germany	2–3	2–3	UEFA Euro 2008
12	12 October 2010	Laugardalsvöllur, Reykjavík, Iceland	Iceland	3–1	3–1	UEFA Euro 2012 qualifying
13	17 November 2010	Estádio da Luz, Lisbon, Portugal	Spain	2–0	4–0	Friendly
14	17 November 2010	Estádio da Luz, Lisbon, Portugal	Spain	3–0	4–0	Friendly
15	4 June 2011	Estádio da Luz, Lisbon, Portugal	Norway	1–0	1–0	UEFA Euro 2012 qualifying
16	10 August 2011	Estádio Algarve, São João da Venda, Portugal	Luxembourg	1–0	5–0	Friendly
17	7 October 2011	Estádio do Dragão, Porto, Portugal	Iceland	3–0	5–3	UEFA Euro 2012 qualifying
18	15 November 2011	Estádio da Luz, Lisbon, Portugal	Bosnia and Herzegovina	4–2	6–2	UEFA Euro 2012 qualifying
19	15 November 2011	Estádio da Luz, Lisbon, Portugal	Bosnia and Herzegovina	6–2	6–2	UEFA Euro 2012 qualifying
20	13 June 2012	Arena Lviv, Lviv, Ukraine	Denmark	2–0	3–2	UEFA Euro 2012
21	7 September 2012	Stade Josy Barthel, Luxembourg City, Luxembourg	Luxembourg	2–1	2–1	2014 World Cup qualification
22	11 September 2012	Estádio Municipal de Braga, Braga, Portugal	Azerbaijan	2–0	3–0	2014 World Cup qualification
23	16 October 2012	Estádio do Dragão, Porto, Portugal	Northern Ireland	1–1	1–1	2014 World Cup qualification
24	6 February 2013	Estádio D. Afonso Henriques, Guimarães, Portugal	Ecuador	2–1	2–3	Friendly
25	22 March 2013	Ramat Gan Stadium, Ramat Gan, Israel	Israel	2–3	3–3	2014 World Cup qualification
26	7 June 2013	Estádio da Luz, Lisbon, Portugal	Russia	1–0	1–0	2014 World Cup qualification
27	15 October 2013	Estádio Cidade de Coimbra, Coimbra, Portugal	Luxembourg	3–0	3–0	2014 World Cup qualification

== Honours ==
Porto

- Primeira Liga: 2002–03, 2006–07
- Taça de Portugal: 2002–03
- Supertaça Cândido de Oliveira: 2004
- UEFA Cup: 2002–03
- Intercontinental Cup: 2004

Sporting CP

- Supertaça Cândido de Oliveira: 2008

Atlético Kolkata

- Indian Super League: 2016

Portugal

- UEFA European Championship runner-up: 2004

Orders

- Medal of Merit, Order of the Immaculate Conception of Vila Viçosa (House of Braganza)
