= Vítor Riça =

Portuguese footballer

Personal information
- Full name: Vítor Manuel Costa Riça
- Date of birth: 3 May 1974 (age 52)
- Place of birth: Chaves, Portugal
- Height: 1.88 m (6 ft 2 in)
- Position: Striker

Youth career
- 1986–1992: Chaves

Senior career*
Years	Team	Apps	(Gls)
1992–1993	Carrazedo		
1993–1994	Boticas		
1994–1995	Montalegre		
1995–1996	Fafe		
1996–1998	Montalegre	20	(3)
1998	Moreirense	7	(1)
1999	União Lamas	17	(4)
1999	Moreirense	6	(2)
1999–2000	União Lamas	17	(4)
2000–2001	Moreirense	29	(10)
2001–2002	Covilhã	38	(24)
2002–2003	Chaves	24	(5)
2003–2004	Dragões Sandinenses	31	(32)
2004–2005	Feirense	30	(9)
2005–2007	Lousada	35	(13)
2007	Wuhan Guanggu		
2007–2008	Lousada	16	(2)
2011–2015	Portoghesi Ticino		
- * Club domestic league appearances and goals

Vítor Manuel Costa Riça (born 3 May 1974 in Chaves, Vila Real District) is a Portuguese retired footballer who played as a striker.
