= Luís Bilro =

Portuguese footballer and beach soccer player

Personal information
- Full name: Luís Miguel Bilro Pereira
- Date of birth: 1 April 1971 (age 55)
- Place of birth: Borba, Portugal
- Height: 1.78 m (5 ft 10 in)
- Position: Defender

Youth career
- 1982–1985: Seixal
- 1985–1989: Sporting CP

Senior career*
Years	Team	Apps	(Gls)
1989–1990	Seixal	27	(0)
1990–1991	Atlético	31	(5)
1991–1992	Olhanense	33	(2)
1992–1993	Sporting CP	0	(0)
1993–2004	União Leiria	311	(10)
2005	Lusitânia	9	(0)
2008–2011	Sporting CP (beach soccer)		
Total		411	(17)

International career
1987	Portugal U16	12	(0)
2005–2008	Portugal (beach soccer)		
- * Club domestic league appearances and goals

Luís Miguel Bilro Pereira (born 1 April 1971), known as Bilro, is a Portuguese retired football and beach soccer player.

While playing association football, in a career that lasted over a decade, he operated as right-back or central defender, having represented União de Leiria for 11 professional seasons.

He amassed Primeira Liga totals of 245 games and nine goals.

== Association football career ==
Bilro was born in Borba, Évora District. After finishing his footballing formation at Sporting CP he made his professional debut with Seixal FC, where he had begun as an infant. He went to represent Atlético Clube de Portugal and S.C. Olhanense, returning to Sporting for 1992–93 and spending an entire season without any official appearances, being released afterwards.

After leaving Sporting, Bilro moved to U.D. Leiria, where he would appear in nearly 400 competitive matches, helping the club achieve Primeira Liga promotion in his first year and being coached in the 2001–02 campaign by young manager José Mourinho, as the side from the Lis River finished seventh.

== Beach soccer career ==
After spending the latter part of 2004–05 with modest S.C. Lusitânia, Bilro moved to beach soccer, helping the Portugal national team win the BSWW Mundialito in 2008 and 2009. Shortly after, he moved back to Sporting but in his new sport.

In 2011, Bilro retired at the age of 40 and started coaching his last team.

== Honours ==
=== Beach soccer ===
- Euro League: 2007, 2008
- FIFA World Cup third place: 2008
- Euro League: 2007 (in Portugal); runner-up: 2007 (Italy); third place: 2007 (Spain)
- Mundialito: 2008, 2009; runner-up: 2007
