= João Manuel (footballer, born 1967) =

Portuguese footballer (1967–2005)

Personal information
- Full name: João Manuel Loureiro dos Santos
- Date of birth: 31 August 1967
- Place of birth: Moimenta da Beira, Portugal
- Date of death: 18 May 2005 (aged 37)
- Place of death: Guimarães, Portugal
- Height: 1.78 m (5 ft 10 in)
- Position: Midfielder

Senior career*
Years	Team	Apps	(Gls)
1987–1988	Viseu e Benfica		
1988–1992	Académico de Viseu	51	(7)
1992–1995	Académica de Coimbra	86	(8)
1995–2004	União de Leiria	251	(11)
2004	Moreirense	2	(0)
- * Club domestic league appearances and goals

João Manuel Loureiro dos Santos, known as João Manuel (31 August 1967 – 18 May 2005) was a Portuguese footballer who played as a midfielder.

== Club career ==
João Manuel made his professional debut in the Primeira Liga for Académico de Viseu on 28 August 1988 as a starter in a 0–0 draw against Marítimo. Over his career, he played 255 games on the top level of Portuguese football, most of them with União de Leiria, he also played in the UEFA Europa League and UEFA Intertoto Cup with the club.

== International career ==
João Manuel was called up to the Portugal national football team several times in 1996 and 1997, but stayed on the bench in each game he was on the roster.

== Death ==
João Manuel died on 18 May 2005 of multiple sclerosis.
