= Estádio Municipal da Marinha Grande =

Football stadium in Marinha Grande, Portugal

Coordinates: 39.736977°N 8.931459°W

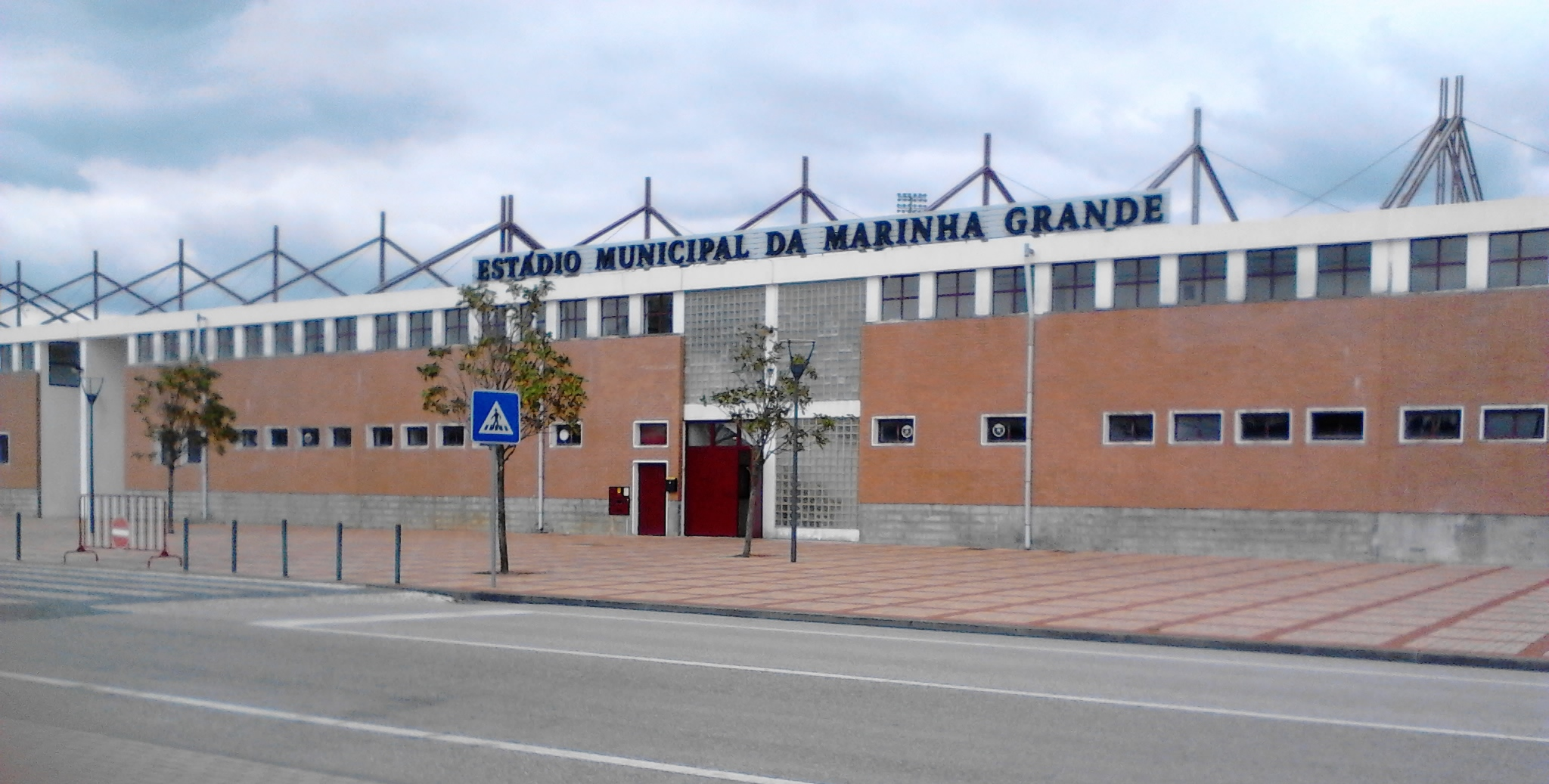
- Interactive map of Estádio Municipal da Marinha Grande
- Location: Marinha Grande, Portugal
- Owner: Municipality of Marinha Grande
- Capacity: 5,200
- Surface: grass

Construction
- Built: 1992
- Opened: 1992
- Cost: 500,000€

Tenants
- A.C. Marinhense; U.D. Leiria (2002-03;2011-12)

Estádio Municipal da Marinha Grande is a football stadium in Marinha Grande, Portugal. It hosts football matches for Atlético Clube Marinhense and hosted the home matches of U.D. Leiria in 2002–03 when Estádio Dr. Magalhães Pessoa was being renovated. The stadium is able to hold 5,200 people and opened in 1992.

In 2011–12, U.D. Leiria relocated again to Marinha Grande for 3 years, claiming excessive rent at Estádio Dr. Magalhães Pessoa, after it was relegated, the deal was abandoned and U.D. Leiria moved to Campo da Portela in Santa Catarina da Serra.
