= 2002–03 Primeira Liga =

69th season of top-tier Portuguese football

Primeira Liga
- Season: 2002–03
- Dates: 22 August 2002 – 1 June 2003
- Champions: Porto; 19th title
- Relegated: Varzim; Santa Clara; Setúbal
- Champions League: Porto (group stage); Benfica (third qualifying round)
- UEFA Cup: Sporting CP (first round); Leiria (qualifying round)
- Matches: 306
- Goals: 806 (2.63 per match)
- Top goalscorer: Fary; Simão (18 goals)
- Biggest home win: Benfica 7–0 Paços de Ferreira (10 November 2002)
- Biggest away win: Marítimo 0–5 Setúbal (22 September 2002)
- Highest scoring: 5–3 (2 times); 6–2 (1 time)

The 2002–03 Primeira Liga was the 69th edition of top flight of Portuguese football. It started on 25 August 2002 with a match between Varzim and Paços de Ferreira, and ended on 1 June 2003. The league was contested by 18 clubs with Sporting CP as the defending champions.

Porto won the league and qualified for the 2003–04 UEFA Champions League group stage, along with Benfica, who qualified for the third round. Sporting and União de Leiria qualified for the 2003–04 UEFA Cup. In opposite, Varzim, Santa Clara and Vitória de Setúbal were relegated to the Segunda Liga. Faye Fary was the top scorer with 18 goals.

== Promotion and relegation ==
=== Teams relegated to Segunda Liga ===
- Salgueiros
- Farense
- Alverca

Salgueiros, Farense and Alverca, were consigned to the Segunda Liga following their final classification in 2001–02 season.

=== Teams promoted from Segunda Liga ===
- Moreirense
- Académica de Coimbra
- Nacional

The other three teams were replaced by Moreirense, Académica and Nacional from the Segunda Liga.

== Teams ==
=== Stadia and locations ===
Location of teams in 2002–03 Primeira Liga (Mainland)
Location of teams in Madeira
Location of teams in Azores

Team	Head coach	City	Stadium	2001–02 finish
Académica de Coimbra	(Portugal) João Alves	Coimbra	Estádio Cidade de Coimbra	2nd in Segunda Liga
Beira-Mar	(Portugal) António Sousa	Aveiro	Estádio Mário Duarte	11th
Belenenses	(Brazil) Marinho Peres	Lisbon	Estádio do Restelo	5th
Benfica	(Portugal) Jesualdo Ferreira	Lisbon	Estádio Nacional	4th
Boavista	(Portugal) Jaime Pacheco	Porto	Estádio do Bessa	2nd
Braga	(Spain) Castro Santos	Braga	Estádio Primeiro de Maio	10th
Marítimo	(Portugal) Nelo Vingada	Funchal	Estádio dos Barreiros	11th
Moreirense	(Portugal) Manuel Machado	Moreira de Cónegos	Parque de Jogos	1st in Segunda Liga
Nacional	(Portugal) José Peseiro	Funchal	Estádio da Madeira	3rd in Segunda Liga
Paços de Ferreira	(Portugal) José Mota	Paços de Ferreira	Estádio da Mata Real	8th
Porto	(Portugal) José Mourinho	Porto	Estádio das Antas	3rd
Gil Vicente	(Portugal) Vítor Oliveira	Barcelos	Estádio Adelino Ribeiro Novo	12th
Santa Clara	(Portugal) Manuel Fernandes	Ponta Delgada	Estádio de São Miguel	14th
Sporting CP	(Romania) László Bölöni	Lisbon	Estádio José Alvalade	1st
União de Leiria	(Portugal) Manuel Cajuda	Leiria	Estádio Municipal da Marinha Grande	7th
Varzim	(Portugal) José Alberto Costa	Póvoa de Varzim	Estádio do Varzim Sport Club	15th
Vitória de Guimarães	(Portugal) Augusto Inácio	Guimarães	Estádio D. Afonso Henriques	9th
Vitória de Setúbal	(Portugal) Luís Campos	Setúbal	Estádio do Bonfim	13th

=== Managerial changes ===
Team	Outgoing manager	Date of vacancy	Position in table	Incoming manager	Date of appointment
Académica de Coimbra	(Portugal) João Alves	26 October 2002	18th	(Portugal) Artur Jorge	26 October 2002
Santa Clara	(Portugal) Manuel Fernandes	17 November 2002	16th	(Brazil) Carlos Alberto Silva	18 November 2002
Benfica	(Portugal) Jesualdo Ferreira	24 November 2002	3rd	(Portugal) Fernando Chalana	25 November 2002
Benfica	(Portugal) Fernando Chalana	1 December 2002	3rd	(Spain) Camacho	2 December 2002
Vitória de Setúbal	(Portugal) Luís Campos	3 February 2003	16th	(Portugal) Diamantino Miranda	4 February 2003
Belenenses	(Brazil) Marinho Peres	9 February 2003	10th	(Portugal) Manuel José	10 February 2003
Varzim	(Portugal) José Alberto Costa	8 March 2003	10th	(Portugal) Luís Campos	9 March 2003
Vitória de Setúbal	(Portugal) Diamantino Miranda	9 March 2003	17th	(Portugal) Carlos Cardoso	10 March 2003
Braga	(Spain) Castro Santos	6 April 2003	14th	(Portugal) Jesualdo Ferreira	20 April 2003

== League table ==
Pos	Team	Pld	W	D	L	GF	GA	GD	Pts	Qualification or relegation
1	Porto (C)	34	27	5	2	73	26	+47	86	Qualification to Champions League group stage
2	Benfica	34	23	6	5	74	27	+47	75	Qualification to Champions League third qualifying round
3	Sporting CP	34	17	8	9	52	38	+14	59	Qualification to UEFA Cup first round
4	Vitória de Guimarães	34	14	8	12	47	46	+1	50	
5	União de Leiria	34	13	10	11	49	47	+2	49	Qualification to UEFA Cup qualifying round (Note: Leiria qualified for the UEFA Cup as Portuguese Cup runners-up)
6	Paços de Ferreira	34	12	9	13	40	47	−7	45	
7	Marítimo	34	13	5	16	36	48	−12	44	
8	Gil Vicente	34	13	5	16	42	53	−11	44	
9	Belenenses	34	11	10	13	47	48	−1	43	
10	Boavista	34	10	13	11	32	31	+1	43	
11	Nacional	34	9	13	12	40	46	−6	40	
12	Moreirense	34	9	12	13	42	46	−4	39	
13	Beira-Mar	34	10	9	15	43	50	−7	39	
14	Braga	34	8	14	12	34	47	−13	38	
15	Académica	34	8	13	13	38	48	−10	37	
16	Varzim (R)	34	10	6	18	38	51	−13	36	Relegation to Segunda Liga
17	Santa Clara (R)	34	8	11	15	39	54	−15	35	Relegation to Segunda Liga
18	Vitória de Setúbal (R)	34	6	13	15	40	53	−13	31	Relegation to Segunda Liga

Source: Primeira Liga
Rules for classification: 1) points; 2) head-to-head points; 3) head-to-head goal difference; 4) goal difference; 5) number of goals scored
(C) Champions; (R) Relegated

== Results ==
Home \ Away	ACA	BEM	BEL	BEN	BOA	BRA	GVI	MAR	MOR	NAC	PAÇ	POR	STC	SCP	ULE	VAR	VGU	VSE
Académica		1–1	2–1	1–4	0–1	1–0	2–0	2–0	1–1	2–2	2–2	1–1	3–2	0–2	3–2	2–1	2–2	1–1
Beira-Mar	1–0		2–1	0–2	3–3	2–2	5–0	1–0	1–2	0–2	3–1	1–1	2–1	1–3	2–2	2–1	1–1	5–3
Belenenses	2–0	3–2		2–4	0–0	3–2	1–1	3–1	1–0	0–0	1–0	1–3	1–1	1–1	1–3	4–1	1–0	0–0
Benfica	1–1	1–0	1–0		1–1	3–0	3–1	3–0	1–1	2–0	7–0	0–1	1–0	1–2	3–1	2–1	4–0	1–1
Boavista	4–1	1–0	1–3	0–0		2–1	0–1	3–0	0–0	0–0	0–0	0–1	1–0	1–2	0–1	2–1	3–1	1–0
Braga	1–1	0–0	1–1	1–3	1–0		0–0	0–1	2–1	4–1	1–0	1–1	1–1	4–2	1–1	1–0	2–4	1–0
Gil Vicente	1–1	3–1	3–1	0–2	1–0	3–0		0–1	2–1	2–0	1–1	3–5	1–2	1–0	3–1	2–1	0–2	0–1
Marítimo	2–1	3–0	2–1	1–2	0–0	3–0	3–1		3–1	2–3	2–0	2–1	1–1	0–3	2–0	2–0	1–0	0–5
Moreirense	1–0	1–2	3–1	2–3	1–1	2–2	2–1	2–2		2–0	2–0	0–1	2–2	1–2	2–1	1–0	1–2	2–2
Nacional	3–2	1–0	1–1	1–0	0–1	0–0	0–1	0–0	1–1		4–0	1–2	2–1	1–1	2–2	2–0	0–0	1–1
Paços de Ferreira	0–0	1–0	3–2	1–3	3–1	0–1	2–0	0–0	1–1	3–3		1–0	3–1	4–0	1–0	3–1	1–2	1–2
Porto	4–1	3–0	2–2	2–1	1–0	3–0	3–1	1–0	2–1	5–2	2–1		5–0	2–0	2–0	3–2	2–1	3–0
Santa Clara	0–0	3–1	3–1	1–2	1–1	0–0	4–2	2–1	2–0	2–3	0–0	1–3		0–1	1–3	2–2	2–1	1–0
Sporting CP	1–0	1–1	2–0	0–2	1–1	2–0	0–3	2–0	3–0	2–0	4–0	0–1	2–1		1–1	0–0	1–1	3–4
União de Leiria	0–0	1–0	1–4	0–3	1–0	1–1	4–2	3–0	2–2	1–0	0–1	2–2	3–1	3–2		3–1	1–2	1–1
Varzim	0–3	1–0	0–2	2–1	1–1	2–0	3–0	4–1	1–0	1–0	0–0	0–2	0–0	1–1	0–2		0–1	3–2
Vitória de Guimarães	1–0	0–2	1–0	1–1	3–1	1–1	1–1	2–0	1–1	3–2	1–4	0–2	5–0	1–3	1–2	2–3		1–0
Vitória de Setúbal	3–1	1–1	1–1	2–6	1–1	2–2	0–1	1–0	0–2	2–2	0–2	0–1	0–0	1–2	0–0	2–4	1–2	

Source: Foradejogo (in Portuguese)
Legend: Blue = home team win; Yellow = draw; Red = away team win.

== Top goalscorers ==
Rank	Player	Club	Goals
1	(Senegal) Faye Fary	Beira-Mar	18
2	(Portugal) Simão	Benfica	18
3	(Brazil) Adriano	Nacional	16
4	(Brazil) Gaúcho	Marítimo	15
5	(Portugal) Hélder Postiga	Porto	13
5	(Portugal) Tiago	Benfica	13
7	(Brazil) Maciel	União de Leiria	12
7	(Portugal) José Barroso	Braga	12
9	(Portugal) Paulo Alves	Gil Vicente	11
9	(Brazil) Mário Jardel	Sporting	11
9	(Mozambique) Dário	Académica	11
9	(Portugal) Ricardo Sousa	Beira-Mar	11

== Attendances ==
#	Club	Average
1	Porto	28,248
2	Benfica	22,541
3	Sporting	14,789
4	Os Belenenses	5,382
5	Braga	5,194
6	Boavista	5,147
7	Marítimo	5,147
8	Académica	5,059
9	Beira-Mar	4,735
10	Vitória SC	4,729
11	Vitória FC	4,706
12	Santa Clara	3,971
13	Paços de Ferreira	3,500
14	Varzim	3,353
15	CD Nacional	3,000
16	Moreirense	2,294
17	União de Leiria	2,206
18	Gil Vicente	2,206
