= Carlos Saleiro =

Portuguese footballer

Personal information
- Full name: Carlos Miguel Mondim Saleiro
- Date of birth: 25 February 1986 (age 40)
- Place of birth: Lisbon, Portugal
- Height: 1.85 m (6 ft 1 in)
- Position: Forward

Youth career
- 1994–2005: Sporting CP

Senior career*
Years	Team	Apps	(Gls)
2003–2004	Sporting B	35	(3)
2005–2011	Sporting CP	43	(3)
2005–2007	→ Olivais e Moscavide (loan)	26	(4)
2007–2008	→ Fátima (loan)	26	(9)
2008	→ Vitória Setúbal (loan)	5	(0)
2009	→ Académica (loan)	13	(4)
2011–2012	Servette	7	(0)
2012–2013	Académica	7	(0)
2014–2016	Oriental	31	(7)
2016	Port Vale	0	(0)
Total		193	(30)

International career
2002–2003	Portugal U17	18	(7)
2004	Portugal U18	2	(0)
2005	Portugal U19	8	(1)
2007	Portugal U20	3	(0)
2007–2008	Portugal U21	6	(2)
2009–2010	Portugal U23	4	(1)
Medal record
Men's football
Representing Portugal
UEFA European U17 Championship
Winner	2003 Portugal
- * Club domestic league appearances and goals

Carlos Miguel Mondim Saleiro (born 25 February 1986) is a Portuguese former professional footballer who played as a forward.

He was the first baby in Portugal born through in vitro fertilisation treatment (IVF), and he began his career at Sporting CP. He played for Sporting B in the 2003–04 season. He won caps at every level of Portuguese international football from under-17 to under-23. He helped his country to win the UEFA European Under-17 Championship in 2003 and the International Challenge Trophy in 2009–11. He was loaned out to Olivais e Moscavide from 2005 to 2007, and helped the club to win promotion out of the Segunda Divisão in 2005–06. He spent the 2007–08 season on loan at Fátima, and was loaned out to Primeira Liga clubs Vitória Setúbal and Académica in the 2008–09 campaign.

He made his first-team debut for Sporting CP in August 2009 and went on to make 67 first-team appearances in two seasons before he moved to Swiss Super League side Servette in July 2011. He signed with Académica in June 2012 and then, after a year out of the game, joined Oriental in July 2014. He signed with the English club Port Vale in July 2016 but left after six weeks.

== Club career ==
=== Sporting CP ===
Carlos Miguel Mondim Saleiro was born in Lisbon on 25 February 1986 and was the first baby in Portugal to be born through in vitro fertilisation treatment (IVF). He spent his youth at Sporting CP's youth academy, and spent the 2003–04 season with Sporting B, scoring three goals in 35 Segunda Divisão – Zona Sul (third tier) matches as they were relegated into the Terceira Divisão (fourth tier).

He spent the latter half of the 2005–06 campaign on loan at Olivais e Moscavide in Segunda Divisão Série D, and though injuries limited him to just two league appearances, he managed to feature in the play-offs as the club secured promotion into the Liga de Honra (second tier). He returned to the club for the 2006–07 campaign, and scored four goals in 26 games as they were relegated in 15th place. He returned to the Liga de Honra for the 2007–08 campaign on loan at newly promoted Fátima, who were coached by Rui Vitória. He scored 11 goals in 32 league and cup appearances despite Fátima suffering relegation in last place. Despite their league form, Fátima did manage to pull off one of the biggest shock victories of their history by eliminating Porto out of the Taça da Liga on penalties. He was later voted as the second best player of the tournament, behind Cláudio Pitbull, having scored against Santa Clara, converted in the shoot-out against Porto, and scored in the club's fourth round defeat to his parent club Sporting CP. He signed a new four-year contract with Sporting CP in April 2008. He stated that he aimed to win a first-team place and was "tired of loans".

He was given Primeira Liga (first tier) experience for the 2008–09 season after securing a loan move to Vitória de Setúbal. However, he featured just five times in the league under coach Daúto Faquirá, leading Saleiro to complain to the press about his lack of first-team opportunities. He spent the second half of the campaign on loan at Académica, and finished the season as the club's joint-second-highest scorer (tied with Modou Sougou) with four goals in 13 games to help the club secure a seventh-place finish in the Primeira Liga.

Saleiro made his first-team debut for the "Lions" under Paulo Bento on 26 August 2009, playing 30 minutes in a 1–1 draw with Fiorentina at the Stadio Artemio Franchi for the last qualifying round of the UEFA Champions League. Four days later he made his league debut for the club, in a 1–0 win at former side Académica. He made a total of 28 appearances in the 2009–10 season, scoring five goals, mostly under the stewardship of new head coach Carlos Carvalhal. He made 39 appearances in the 2010–11 season, scoring two goals, as Sporting CP finished in third place, some distance behind 'Big Three' rivals Porto and Benfica. However, much to his frustration, he was frequently used a late substitute by coach Paulo Sérgio and so had limited game time at the Estádio José Alvalade. He chose to leave Sporting CP a year before the end of his contract to search for first-team football elsewhere, despite reports that new head coach Domingos Paciência's rated him highly.

=== Servette to Oriental ===
Saleiro signed a two-year contract with Servette in July 2011, who were managed by Portuguese head coach João Alves and director of football Costinha. He hoped the move would allow him a chance to win himself a place in the Portugal squad for UEFA Euro 2012. However, he struggled with injuries and played only seven Swiss Super League matches in the 2011–12 season. He signed with Pedro Emanuel's Académica in June 2012. He missed pre-season with an Achilles tendon injury however, and after returning to fitness in November featured in just seven Primeira Liga and five cup games. He was without a club for the 2013–14 season. He signed with Segunda Liga club Clube Oriental de Lisboa in July 2014. He finished the 2014–15 season with five goals in 20 appearances and signed a one-year contract extension in June 2015. The 2015–16 season proved to be disastrous however, as Oriental were relegated and serious but unproven allegations were made of match fixing against some of the players – though Saleiro himself was not implicated.

=== Port Vale ===
Saleiro signed a two-year contract with English League One club Port Vale, managed by Portuguese coach Bruno Ribeiro, in July 2016. He made his debut for the "Valiants" on 9 August, coming on as a 73rd-minute substitute for Chris Mbamba in a 2–1 defeat to Carlisle United in the EFL Cup. However, his contract was terminated by mutual consent on 16 August 2016, with a club statement revealing that he "found it difficult to adjust to life in the country".

== International career ==
Saleiro represented Portugal at the 2003 UEFA European Under-17 Championship. He scored against England in the semi-finals, a 2–2 draw at the Estádio do Fontelo; he went on to convert his penalty in the shoot-out to help Portugal progress into the final. He also played in the final, where two goals from Márcio Sousa gave Portugal a 2–1 win over Spain to win his country a fifth UEFA European Under-17 Championship title. He also travelled to Finland for the 2003 FIFA U-17 World Championship, where Spain exacted their revenge by eliminating Portugal at the quarter-final stage. In total he scored seven goals in 18 under-17 games. Then he won two caps at under-18 level in 2004. The following year he scored one goal in eight appearances for the under-19 team. He travelled with the Portugal under-20 squad for the 2007 Toulon Tournament, and featured in three games.

He was called up to the Portugal under-21 team. He appeared in qualification games for the 2009 UEFA European Under-21 Championship, scoring in a 2–0 win over Bulgaria at the Estádio D. Afonso Henriques on 26 March 2008. He was called up to the Portugal under-23 squad for the 2009–11 International Challenge Trophy, and played in the final where Portugal defeated England 1–0 at Sixfields Stadium.

== Club statistics ==
Appearances and goals by club, season and competition
Club	Season	League			National Cup (Note: Appearances and goals in the Taça de Portugal, Swiss Cup, and FA Cup.)		League cup (Note: Appearances and goals in the Taça da Liga and EFL Cup.)		Other		Total	
Club	Season	Division	Apps	Goals	Apps	Goals	Apps	Goals	Apps	Goals	Apps	Goals
Sporting B	2003–04	Segunda Divisão – Zona Sul	35	3	0	0	0	0	0	0	35	3
Sporting CP	2009–10	Primeira Liga	16	2	2	1	3	1	7 (Note: Appearance(s) in the UEFA Champions League and UEFA Europa League.)	1	28	5
Sporting CP	2010–11	Primeira Liga	27	1	2	0	1	0	9	1	39	2
Sporting CP	Total		43	3	4	1	4	1	16	2	67	7
Olivais e Moscavide (loan)	2005–06	Segunda Divisão Série D	2	0	0	0	0	0	1 (Note: Appearance in the play-offs.)	0	3	0
Olivais e Moscavide (loan)	2006–07	Liga de Honra	24	4	2	0	0	0	0	0	26	4
Fátima (loan)	2007–08	Liga de Honra	26	9	1	0	5	2	0	0	32	11
Vitória Setúbal (loan)	2008–09	Primeira Liga	5	0	2	0	0	0	0	0	7	0
Académica (loan)	2008–09	Primeira Liga	13	4	0	0	0	0	0	0	13	4
Servette	2011–12	Swiss Super League	7	0	1	0	0	0	0	0	8	0
Académica	2012–13	Primeira Liga	7	0	2	0	3	1	0	0	12	1
Oriental	2014–15	Segunda Liga	16	2	1	0	3	3	0	0	20	5
Oriental	2015–16	LigaPro	15	5	0	0	0	0	0	0	15	5
Oriental	Total		31	7	1	0	3	3	0	0	35	10
Port Vale	2016–17	EFL League One	0	0	0	0	1	0	0	0	1	0
Career total			193	30	13	1	16	7	17	2	239	40

== Honours ==
Olivais e Moscavide

- Segunda Divisão: 2005–06

Portugal U17

- UEFA European Under-17 Championship: 2003

Portugal U23

- International Challenge Trophy: 2009–11
