= Bruno Ribeiro =

Portuguese football manager (born 1975)

Personal information
- Full name: Bruno Miguel Fernandes Ribeiro
- Date of birth: 22 October 1975 (age 51)
- Place of birth: Setúbal, Portugal
- Height: 1.72 m (5 ft 8 in)
- Position: Midfielder

Youth career
- 1986–1994: Vitória Setúbal

Senior career*
Years	Team	Apps	(Gls)
1994–1997	Vitória Setúbal	41	(3)
1997–1999	Leeds United	42	(4)
1999–2001	Sheffield United	25	(1)
2001	→ União de Leiria (loan)	9	(0)
2001–2002	Beira-Mar	25	(1)
2002–2003	Santa Clara	23	(2)
2003–2010	Vitória Setúbal	136	(7)
2009	→ Chaves (loan)	4	(0)
Total		305	(18)

International career
1997	Portugal U21	5	(0)

Managerial career
- 2011–2012: Vitória Setúbal
- 2012–2013: Farense
- 2014: Moura
- 2014–2015: Pinhalnovense
- 2015: Vitória Setúbal
- 2015: Ludogorets Razgrad
- 2016: Académico de Viseu
- 2016: Port Vale
- 2017: Salgueiros
- 2017–2018: Cova da Piedade
- 2018: Salgueiros
- 2019: Interclube
- 2019–2020: Olhanense
- 2020–2021: Moura
- * Club domestic league appearances and goals

Bruno Miguel Fernandes Ribeiro (born 22 October 1975) is a Portuguese former football manager and player.

A midfielder with a powerful left-foot strike, he began his playing career with hometown club Vitória Setúbal from 1994 to 1997, before he had four years in England with Leeds United and Sheffield United. He returned to Portugal to play for União de Leiria, Beira-Mar and Santa Clara, before spending 2003 to 2010 back with Vitória Setúbal. He spent the majority of his career in the Primeira Liga, though he also spent time in the second tier and the English Football League and Premier League. He made a total of 351 career appearances, scoring 21 goals. He won all of his honours with Vitória Setúbal, winning promotion out of the second tier in 1995–96 and 2003–04, winning the Taça de Portugal in 2005, and Taça da Liga in 2008, whilst picking up runners-up medals in the Supertaça Cândido de Oliveira in 2005 and Taça de Portugal in 2006. He also won five caps for the Portugal under-21 team in 1997.

He was promoted from youth team coach to first-team coach at Vitória Setúbal in 2011 and went on to have brief spells in charge at Farense, Moura, Pinhalnovense, Vitória Setúbal (again), Ludogorets Razgrad (Bulgaria), and Académico de Viseu. He was appointed manager of English club Port Vale in June 2016, where he worked for six months before tendering his resignation. He returned to Portugal and took charge at Salgueiros for two months in April 2017. He was appointed Cova da Piedade head coach in November 2017, leaving this post the following summer. He briefly took charge at Salgueiros in October 2018 before returning to another former club, Vitória Setúbal, to coach the juniors the following month. In January 2019, he emigrated to Angola to coach Interclube, before returning to Portugal 11 months later as head coach at Olhanense. He was reappointed as Moura's head coach in September 2020.

== Playing career ==
Bruno Miguel Fernandes Ribeiro was born in Setúbal, and progressed through the youth team ranks at local Primeira Divisão club Vitória Setúbal to make the first-team bench for the first time on 29 May 1994. A left-sided midfielder with a powerful shot, he also possessed a quick temper and was liable to pick up yellow and red cards. His first-team debut came on 29 September 1994, when he came on as a 66th-minute substitute for Paulo Gomes in a 3–0 defeat to Gil Vicente at the Estádio Adelino Ribeiro Novo. He scored his first goal for the club on 28 May 1995, in a 4–1 victory over União da Madeira, and ended the 1994–95 season with one goal in eleven appearances as the club suffered relegation. He then scored two goals in nine games as they won promotion at the first attempt in 1995–96. He played a further 21 top-flight matches in the 1996–97 campaign, where he was spotted by Leeds United manager George Graham, who had been scouting Jimmy Floyd Hasselbaink. Ribeiro also won five caps for the Portugal under-21 team.

Ribeiro was sold to the English Premier League club Leeds United for a fee of £500,000 in July 1997, making him a Hasselbaink teammate, who also joined the club in the summer. He scored his first goal for Leeds in his second appearance, a 3–1 victory over Sheffield Wednesday at Hillsborough, and went on to score a total of four goals in 35 games in the 1997–98 season. However, he picked up an injury at the start of the 1998–99 season. He failed to win back his first-team place under new manager David O'Leary. He left Elland Road in October 1999, as he was sold to First Division side Sheffield United for £500,000 in October 1999. He made 22 appearances in the 1999–2000 season and eight appearances in the 2000–01 season, mostly as a substitute as he failed to secure a first-team spot at Bramall Lane. He returned to Portugal on loan at União de Leiria in January 2001.

He spent the 2001–02 season with Beira-Mar, scoring one goal in 26 games. He joined Azores based club Santa Clara for the 2002–03 campaign, scoring twice in 25 games as the club suffered relegation. He subsequently rejoined Vitória, with the club now playing in the second division, and played 27 games (scoring one goal) as Vitória were promoted back into the top-flight after finishing in second-place in 2003–04. He remained a key first-team player throughout the 2004–05, 2005–06 and 2006–07 campaigns, making 90 first-team appearances across the three seasons. He helped the club to win the Taça de Portugal in 2005, as they beat Benfica 2–1 at the Estádio Nacional. He also captained the club in the 2005 Supertaça Cândido de Oliveira, as Vitória lost 1–0 to Benfica; he was replaced by Antonio Franja on 75 minutes. He then played in the 2006 Taça de Portugal final, where they were beaten 1–0 by Porto. He was unable to play in the 2006 Supertaça Cândido de Oliveira due to injury.

Ribeiro gradually lost his importance in the squad in the 2007–08 season, though he scored the 1–0 winner with a long-range effort against Sporting CP on 24 February. He helped his side win the 2007–08 Taça da Liga but was an unused substitute in the final. He was loaned out to Chaves at the start of the 2009–10 season. However, after Manuel Fernandes was reinstated as Vitória's first-team coach, Ribeiro returned to the squad in January 2010. He played seven games in the remainder of the 2009–10 campaign and helped the club to avoid relegation, before he announced his retirement in the summer.

== Managerial career ==
=== Early career ===
In March 2011, Ribeiro succeeded Manuel Fernandes as head coach at Vitória Setúbal, having previously coached the club's under-17 team. He was sacked following a 3–0 away defeat to Braga on 13 February 2012 that placed the team last in the league; he later harshly criticized the board of directors. Vitória went on to avoid relegation at the end of the 2011–12 season under the stewardship of new manager José Mota. In June 2012, Ribeiro was appointed head coach at Farense in the lower leagues. From March to November 2014 he worked with Moura, also in the third tier. He returned to Vitória Setúbal in January 2015, taking over from Domingos Paciência, and managed to steer the club away from relegation at the end of the 2014–15 season despite only winning three of his 17 games in charge. He decided to leave the club at the expiry of his contract, stating that he was satisfied with his accomplishment.

=== Ludogorets and Académico de Viseu ===
In June 2015, he was appointed as head coach at Bulgarian Parva Liga champions Ludogorets Razgrad and told the Bulgarian media: "José Mourinho is like a brother of mine [Mourinho was youth team coach at Vitória Setúbal in the 1990s]... it is possible that some Chelsea players will join Ludogorets [on loan]. I'll talk with Mourinho and see what happens. Without doubt he is going to help us". However, Ludogorets recorded three losses in Ribeiro's first three matches, including elimination from the UEFA Champions League qualifying rounds and defeat in the 2015 Bulgarian Supercup, and he was sacked after less than two months in charge with the club claiming it was a "disciplinary sacking and unilateral termination of the contract" due to "his prolonged absence from the job despite a standing and binding contract". Ribeiro stated that the club signed players without his knowledge and the sporting director further eroded his authority by interfering in training sessions. Coach Andy Smith later recalled how "mafia types with firework" tried to attack the pair of them in Bulgaria. In February 2016, Ribeiro returned to Portugal and signed a contract at LigaPro side Académico de Viseu to run until the end of the 2016–17 season. However, he resigned from the club on 10 March after failing to win any of his five matches in charge, citing dissatisfaction with the way the club was being run.

=== Port Vale ===
In June 2016, he was appointed manager of English League One club Port Vale on a three-year contract. He oversaw a complete overhaul of the playing staff, signing an influx of foreign talent including Rigino Cicilia, Anthony de Freitas, Kjell Knops, Calvin Mac-Intosch, Quentin Pereira, Kiko, Carlos Saleiro, Paulo Tavares, Chris Mbamba, Sébastien Amoros, Miguel Santos, and Gëzim Shalaj; as well as British players Anton Forrester and Jerome Thomas, Nathan Ferguson, and Martin Paterson; with Alex Jones and Sam Hart also joining on loan. However, it would be 20-year-old centre-back Nathan Smith who would prove to be the club's best player; Riberio handed him his debut on the opening day of the season, and Smith would retain his first-team place long after Riberio's departure. He appointed Jak Alnwick, Ben Purkiss and Anthony Grant as joint-captains, and got off to a good start by winning his first six home games at Vale Park. He was named as the Football League Paper's League One Manager of the Day after Vale defeated Scunthorpe United 3–1 on 27 August. However, they entered Christmas in 17th-place, leaving chairman Norman Smurthwaite to declare that 'Plan B' had been triggered, meaning the signing of "seasoned, higher grade" players, whilst he admitted he felt "a little bit hoodwinked" as Ribeiro's friends in the game (José Mourinho, Aitor Karanka, and Carlos Carvalhal) had provided him with glowing references but had thus far failed to lend any of their players to the Vale. Ribeiro resigned as manager of Port Vale on 26 December, hours after witnessing his side lose 1–0 at home to Walsall.

=== Return to Portugal ===
Ribeiro was appointed head coach at Campeonato de Portugal club Salgueiros on 6 April 2017 following the sacking of Filipe Cândido. The contract was to cover only the final five games of the 2016–17 season. Salgueiros finished third in the North zone Promotion group, missing out on a place in the promotion play-offs on goal difference.

On 14 November 2017, Ribeiro was appointed as the new head coach at Cova da Piedade, who were in the relegation places of the LigaPro after picking up only 13 points from their first 13 games. On 6 December, he led the team to a penalty shoot-out victory over top-flight Marítimo following a 0–0 draw after extra time in the fifth round of the Taça de Portugal at the Estádio do Marítimo. The "Rapazes de Azul-Grená" ended the 2017–18 season in ninth-place and he was reported to have agreed a new one-year contract in May 2018. However, he left the club the following month. On 7 October, he was appointed as manager of former club Salgueiros, now in the Porto FA Elite Division (fourth tier), until the end of the 2017–18 season. He left this post after just two games when was appointed as head coach of the Vitória Setúbal junior team.

=== Interclube ===
In January 2019, Ribeiro signed an 18-month contract with Angolan Girabola side Interclube. "Os Polícias" finished fifth at the end of the 2018–19 season.

=== Return to Portugal ===
On 31 December 2019, Riberio returned to Portuguese football as the new manager of Campeonato de Portugal side Olhanense. The "Leões de Olhão" were top of Serie D when the 2019–20 season was ended prematurely due to the COVID-19 pandemic in Portugal, with no clubs promoted from Serie D. On 8 September 2020, Ribeiro returned to manage Moura in the Campeonato de Portugal. Moura picked up just four points from 20 games as they were relegated in the 2020–21 campaign.

== Style of management ==
Ribeiro has stated that 90% of his training ground work is based on José Mourinho's ideas, using possession play, building from the back – instructing his players not to play long balls, and maintaining a fixed shape. He prefers to play with a 4–3–3 formation, utilising a lone striker. Andy Smith, Ribeiro's close friend and preferred coach, has said that Ribeiro is "class" and that "the coaching sessions, the way he prepares" means that "we have a plan A, B and C". He likes to create a "family" feeling in the dressing room.

== Playing statistics ==
Appearances and goals by club, season and competition
Club	Season	League			National cup (Note: Includes Taça de Portugal and FA Cup)		Other (Note: Includes Taça da Liga, Football League Cup, and UEFA Cup)		Total	
Club	Season	Division	Apps	Goals	Apps	Goals	Apps	Goals	Apps	Goals
Vitória Setúbal	1993–94	Primeira Divisão	0	0	0	0	0	0	0	0
Vitória Setúbal	1994–95	Primeira Divisão	11	1	0	0	0	0	11	1
Vitória Setúbal	1995–96	Segunda Divisão de Honra	9	2	0	0	0	0	9	2
Vitória Setúbal	1996–97	Primeira Divisão	21	0	0	0	0	0	21	0
Vitória Setúbal	Total		41	3	0	0	0	0	41	3
Leeds United	1997–98	Premier League	29	3	3	0	3	1	35	4
Leeds United	1998–99	Premier League	13	1	1	1	3	0	17	2
Leeds United	Total		42	4	4	1	6	1	52	6
Sheffield United	1999–2000	First Division	20	1	2	0	0	0	22	1
Sheffield United	2000–01	First Division	5	0	0	0	3	0	8	0
Sheffield United	Total		25	1	2	0	3	0	30	1
União de Leiria (loan)	2000–01	Primeira Liga	9	0	1	0	0	0	10	0
Beira-Mar	2001–02	Primeira Liga	25	1	1	0	0	0	26	1
Santa Clara	2002–03	Primeira Liga	23	2	2	0	0	0	25	2
Vitória Setúbal	2003–04	Segunda Liga	27	1	3	0	0	0	30	1
Vitória Setúbal	2004–05	Primeira Liga	26	1	5	1	0	0	31	2
Vitória Setúbal	2005–06	Primeira Liga	27	2	5	0	2	0	34	2
Vitória Setúbal	2006–07	Primeira Liga	22	2	1	0	2	0	25	2
Vitória Setúbal	2007–08	Primeira Liga	13	1	2	0	2	0	17	1
Vitória Setúbal	2008–09	Primeira Liga	14	0	0	0	3	0	17	0
Vitória Setúbal	2009–10	Primeira Liga	7	0	0	0	0	0	7	0
Vitória Setúbal	Total		136	7	16	1	9	0	161	8
Chaves (loan)	2009–10	Liga de Honra	4	0	2	0	0	0	6	0
Career total			305	18	28	2	18	1	351	21

== Managerial statistics ==
As of match played 10 April 2021

Managerial record by team and tenure
Team	From	To	Record					Ref
Team	From	To	P	W	D	L	Win %	Ref
Vitória Setúbal	2 March 2011	14 February 2012	27	7	8	12	25.9	
Farense	1 July 2012	15 January 2013	15	8	5	2	53.3	
Moura	20 March 2014	16 November 2014	19	11	4	4	57.9	
Pinhalnovense	17 November 2014	21 January 2015	8	4	3	1	50.0	
Vitória Setúbal	21 January 2015	30 June 2015	17	3	6	8	17.6	
Ludogorets Razgrad	1 July 2015	13 August 2015	7	2	1	4	28.6	
Académico de Viseu	15 February 2016	10 March 2016	5	0	2	3	0.0	
Port Vale	20 June 2016	26 December 2016	29	10	6	13	34.5	
Salgueiros	6 April 2017	14 May 2017	6	4	2	0	66.7	
Cova da Piedade	14 November 2017	25 June 2018	25	10	8	7	40.0	
Salgueiros	7 October 2018	14 October 2018	2	1	0	1	50.0	
Interclube	1 January 2019	2019	21	10	7	4	47.6	
Olhanense	31 December 2019	23 February 2020	7	3	3	1	42.9	
Moura	8 September 2020	10 April 2021	20	0	4	16	0.0	
Total			207	73	59	75	35.3	

== Honours ==
=== Player ===
Vitória de Setúbal

- Segunda Divisão de Honra second-place promotion: 1995–96
- Segunda Liga second-place promotion: 2003–04
- Supertaça Cândido de Oliveira runner-up: 2005
- Taça de Portugal: 2005; runner-up 2006
- Taça da Liga: 2008

=== Manager ===
Ludogorets

- Bulgarian Supercup runner-up: 2015
