= Kjell Knops =

Dutch footballer

Personal information
- Full name: Kjell Maria-Goretti Mathieu Knops
- Date of birth: 21 July 1987 (age 39)
- Place of birth: Heerlen, Netherlands
- Height: 1.86 m (6 ft 1 in)
- Position: Centre back

Youth career
- 1994–2008: Roda JC

Senior career*
Years	Team	Apps	(Gls)
2008–2010	Roda JC	1	(0)
2010–2011	EVV	26	(2)
2011–2016	MVV	152	(2)
2016–2018	Port Vale	29	(0)
2018–2019	Helmond Sport	16	(0)
2019–2020	Groene Ster		
2020–2021	EHC		
Total		224	(4)
- * Club domestic league appearances and goals

Kjell Maria-Goretti Mathieu Knops (born 21 July 1987) is a Dutch former professional footballer who played as a centre back.

He began his professional career with Roda JC Kerkrade in 2008 before dropping into amateur football with EVV for the 2010–11 season. He then moved up to the Eerste Divisie for a five-year spell at MVV, who he also captained. He left the Netherlands and travelled to England to join Port Vale in June 2016. He spent two years with the club but missed the entirety of the 2017–18 season due to injury. He returned to the Netherlands and signed with Helmond Sport in August 2018 and then joined Groene Ster in June 2019. He signed with EHC in May 2020.

== Career ==
=== Early career ===
Knops spent his youth with Roda JC Kerkrade. He made his first-team debut in professional football in the Eredivisie (first tier) as a late substitute for Marcel de Jong in a 3–0 win over NEC at the Parkstad Limburg Stadion on 15 November 2008. This would prove his only appearance for the club, and he was one of 11 players released by general manager Martin van Geel in April 2010. He played on trial at RKC Waalwijk in May 2010. He then spent the 2010–11 season in the Topklasse (third tier) with amateur side EVV. He made 28 league and cup appearances as the club posted a ninth-place finish in the Sunday league. He scored two goals for the club, in victories over AFC and Dijkse Boys.

=== MVV Maastricht ===
Knops returned to professional football when he signed with René Trost's MVV in the Eerste Divisie (second tier) for the 2011–12 campaign. He scored his first goal for the club in a 3–2 win over Telstar at the Rabobank IJmond Stadion on 21 October. Four days later he received the first red card of his career after he committed a professional foul in a 1–0 defeat to Achilles '29 in the KNVB Cup. He was sent off for the second and final time of his MVV career on 20 January, after receiving two yellow cards in a 2–2 draw with Helmond Sport at the Stadion De Braak. He featured in a total of 36 games, including both legs of the play-off round one defeat to Cambuur, after the club qualified for the play-offs with an eighth-place finish. He again played 36 matches in the 2012–13 season as MVV finished in fifth place to go straight into the second round of the play-offs, where they were beaten 4–1 by FC Volendam; he later said this was the greatest achievement of his career. He scored his second and final goal for the club on 1 March 2013, in a 2–1 defeat to FC Emmen at De Geusselt. He signed a new two-year contract in June 2013. MVV finished in 11th place in the 2013–14 campaign, with Knops featuring only 26 times as he spent two months out with a knee injury. He made 29 appearances in the 2014–15 campaign, as MVV again finished in 11th spot, and was appointed as club captain. He played 40 games in the 2015–16 season as MVV finished in tenth place, before dropping out of the play-offs at the first round following defeat to FC Volendam. His contract with the club ended on 31 March 2016.

=== Port Vale ===
In June 2016, he signed a two-year contract with EFL League One club Port Vale. He was manager Bruno Ribeiro's first signing for the club. Knops said that he wanted to come to Vale Park because of Ribeiro's attractive style of football. He began the 2016–17 season playing at left-back after injuries to Kiko and Adam Yates. He adapted well to the role and forged an effective partnership with left-winger Jerome Thomas, and remained the "Valiants" first choice left-back despite the signing of Sam Hart and Kiko's recovery from injury. He continued to hold down a first-team place despite the arrival of specialist left-back Scott Tanser in the January transfer window. However, he snapped his knee during a 3–0 defeat to Rochdale at Spotland Stadium on 4 April, and was ruled out of action for nine months. His knee also became infected, forcing him to spend three weeks in hospital. Speaking in June 2017, manager Michael Brown revealed that the infection had returned to the area and further surgery was required, which would keep him ruled out for the 2017–18 season. In May 2018 he was released upon the expiry of his contract by new manager Neil Aspin. However, he stayed on to train with the club to try and win a new contract. He returned to Holland to find a new club at the end of June, citing family reasons.

=== Return to the Netherlands ===
Knops trained with former club MVV before trialling at Eerste Divisie side Helmond Sport, signing a one-year contract with Helmond on 23 August 2018. He faced competition for the left-sided centre-back spot from Joeri Poelmans, Ron Janzen and Nick de Louw. He made 17 appearances across the 2018–19 campaign as Sport finished bottom of the table but were reprieved from relegation due to a league restructuring.

Knops joined Groene Ster in June 2019. The club competed in the Derde Divisie (fourth tier) during the 2019–20 season, which was abandoned due to the COVID-19 pandemic in the Netherlands. He moved on to EHC of the Hoofdklasse (fifth tier) in May 2020. The 2020–21 season was also abandoned.

== Personal life ==
Knops enjoys playing tennis in his spare time.

== Career statistics ==
Appearances and goals by club, season and competition
Club	Season	League			National cup (Note: Includes KNVB Cup, FA Cup)		Other		Total	
Club	Season	Division	Apps	Goals	Apps	Goals	Apps	Goals	Apps	Goals
Roda JC	2008–09	Eredivisie	1	0	0	0	0	0	1	0
Roda JC	2009–10	Eredivisie	0	0	0	0	0	0	0	0
Roda JC	Total		1	0	0	0	0	0	1	0
EVV	2010–11	Topklasse	26	2	2	0	0	0	28	2
MVV	2011–12	Eerste Divisie	32	1	2	0	2 (Note: Appearance(s) in the play-offs.)	0	36	1
MVV	2012–13	Eerste Divisie	33	1	1	0	2	0	36	1
MVV	2013–14	Eerste Divisie	25	0	1	0	0	0	26	0
MVV	2014–15	Eerste Divisie	27	0	2	0	0	0	29	0
MVV	2015–16	Eerste Divisie	35	0	1	0	4	0	40	0
MVV	Total		152	2	7	0	8	0	169	2
Port Vale	2016–17	EFL League One	29	0	2	0	1 (Note: Appearance in the EFL Cup)	0	32	0
Port Vale	2017–18	EFL League Two	0	0	0	0	0	0	0	0
Port Vale	Total		29	0	2	0	1	0	32	0
Helmond Sport	2018–19	Eerste Divisie	16	0	1	0	0	0	17	0
Career total			224	4	12	0	9	0	245	4
