= Sébastien Amoros =

French footballer (born 1995)

Personal information
- Full name: Sébastien Amoros
- Date of birth: 2 July 1995 (age 31)
- Place of birth: Cannes, France
- Height: 1.76 m (5 ft 9 in)
- Position: Midfielder

Youth career
- Monaco

Senior career*
| Years | Team | Apps | (Gls) |
| 2011–2016 | Monaco II | 34 | (0) |
| 2016–2017 | Port Vale | 10 | (0) |
| 2018–2020 | Grasse | 34 | (1) |
| 2020–2021 | Cannes | 4 | (0) |
- * Club domestic league appearances and goals

Sébastien Amoros (born 2 July 1995) is a French former professional footballer who played as a midfielder.

He joined Port Vale in July 2016, following five seasons as a reserve team player at Monaco. He left Port Vale the following year and returned to France to play for Grasse. He joined his hometown club Cannes in June 2020.

== Career ==
=== Monaco II ===
Born in Cannes, Amoros began his career in the youth team at Monaco. He made his debut for the reserve team in the Championnat de France Amateur at the age of 16, coming on as a 66th-minute substitute for Blanstel Koussalouka in a 4–1 win over league champions Uzès Pont du Gard on 2 June 2012. He then featured four times in 2012–13 as Monaco II finished 12th, five times in the 2013–14 season as they finished in eighth place, and did not feature in the 2014–15 campaign, but did though make 24 appearances in the 2015–16 season as Monaco II finished in third place.

=== Port Vale ===
He signed a one-year contract with EFL League One side Port Vale in July 2016. Manager Bruno Ribeiro said that he was a "quality player", but needed time to adjust to League One. He made his debut in professional football on 27 August, coming on as a 16th-minute substitute for Paulo Tavares in a 3–1 win over Scunthorpe United at Vale Park. By mid-December he had started three consecutive games as a holding midfielder, helping the team to go almost four hours without conceding a goal. However, he did not feature under caretaker manager Michael Brown in 2017. He was released at the end of the 2016–17 season. Brown said that "when he could sit in front of the back four and play short passes, that suited him. Once we tried to make it more dynamic and change the style and structure, he didn't really fit into that".

=== Grasse ===
On 9 July 2018, Amoros signed for French Championnat National 2 team Grasse. He featured in 23 of the club's 28 league games during the 2018–19 season, helping Grasse to a ninth-place finish. He made 12 appearances during the 2019–20 season, which was curtailed early due to the COVID-19 pandemic in France with Grasse in second place.

=== Cannes ===
In June 2020, Amoros joined Championnat National 3 side Cannes after head coach Jean-Noël Cabezas aimed to build a team of local players. He made four appearances in the 2020–21 season, which was declared void by the French Football Federation on 23 April due to the ongoing COVID-19 pandemic in France. He was not named in the squad for the 2021–22 season.

== Personal life ==
In 2015, Amoros was dating French reality television personality Martika Caringella.

== Career statistics ==
Appearances and goals by club, season and competition
| Club | Season | League | | | National cup (Note: Includes FA Cup, Coupe de France) | | Other | | Total | |
| Club | Season | Division | Apps | Goals | Apps | Goals | Apps | Goals | Apps | Goals |
|---|---|---|---|---|---|---|---|---|---|---|
| Monaco B | 2011–12 | CFA | 1 | 0 | — | | — | | 1 | 0 |
| Monaco B | 2012–13 | CFA | 4 | 0 | — | | — | | 4 | 0 |
| Monaco B | 2013–14 | CFA | 5 | 0 | — | | — | | 5 | 0 |
| Monaco B | 2014–15 | CFA | 0 | 0 | — | | — | | 0 | 0 |
| Monaco B | 2015–16 | CFA | 24 | 0 | — | | — | | 24 | 0 |
| Monaco B | Total | | 34 | 0 | — | | — | | 34 | 0 |
| Port Vale | 2016–17 | EFL League One | 10 | 0 | 1 | 0 | 2 (Note: Appearances in the EFL Trophy.) | 0 | 13 | 0 |
| Grasse | 2018–19 | National 2 | 23 | 0 | 0 | 0 | 0 | 0 | 23 | 0 |
| Grasse | 2019–20 | National 2 | 11 | 1 | 1 | 0 | 0 | 0 | 12 | 1 |
| Grasse | Total | | 34 | 1 | 1 | 0 | 0 | 0 | 35 | 1 |
| Cannes | 2020–21 | National 3 | 4 | 0 | 0 | 0 | 0 | 0 | 4 | 0 |
| Career total | | | 82 | 1 | 2 | 0 | 2 | 0 | 86 | 1 |
