= 2016–17 Port Vale F.C. season =

Port Vale F.C.
2016–17 season
- Chairman: Norman Smurthwaite
- Manager: Bruno Ribeiro (until 26 December); Michael Brown (from 26 December)
- Stadium: Vale Park
- EFL League One: 21st (49 points)
- FA Cup: Third Round (eliminated by Huddersfield Town)
- EFL Cup: First Round (eliminated by Carlisle United)
- EFL Trophy: Group Stage
- Player of the Year: Nathan Smith
- Top goalscorer: League: Alex Jones (9); All: Alex Jones (10)
- Highest home attendance: 8,999 vs. Sheffield United, 14 April 2017
- Lowest home attendance: 1,025 vs. Mansfield Town, 4 October 2016
- Average home league attendance: 4,813
- Biggest win: 4–0 vs. Hartlepool United, 4 December 2016
- Biggest defeat: 0–4 (three games)
Home colours	Away colours	Third colours

The 2016–17 season was Port Vale's 105th season of football in the English Football League, and fourth-successive season in EFL League One. Vale finished in 21st place – one point from safety – and were relegated.

The club underwent a complete transformation of the playing and managerial team, with 16 players coming in (plus two on loan) and 16 players going out throughout the summer. Ten new arrivals came from European leagues outside the UK, and bookmakers predicted the club would be relegated. However, chairman Norman Smurthwaite expected the team to push for the play-offs under the stewardship of new manager Bruno Ribeiro. Vale were knocked out of the EFL Cup by League Two side Carlisle United. They failed to make it out of the group stages of the EFL Trophy as they were unable to score against League Two clubs Doncaster Rovers and Mansfield Town. Ribeiro, the club's first foreign manager, resigned on Boxing Day, with the club languishing in 17th place.

Assistant manager Michael Brown stepped in as caretaker manager, but was unable to arrest Vale's slide down the table. The club had a poor January transfer window, losing top-scoring loanee striker Alex Jones, star goalkeeper Jak Alnwick, and reigning Player of the Year Anthony Grant. Despite failing to score in six of their final seven games, the fight against relegation went to the last day of the season at Fleetwood Town, but a 0–0 draw was not enough to escape the drop. After relegation was confirmed, Smurthwaite announced that he was stepping down as chairman.

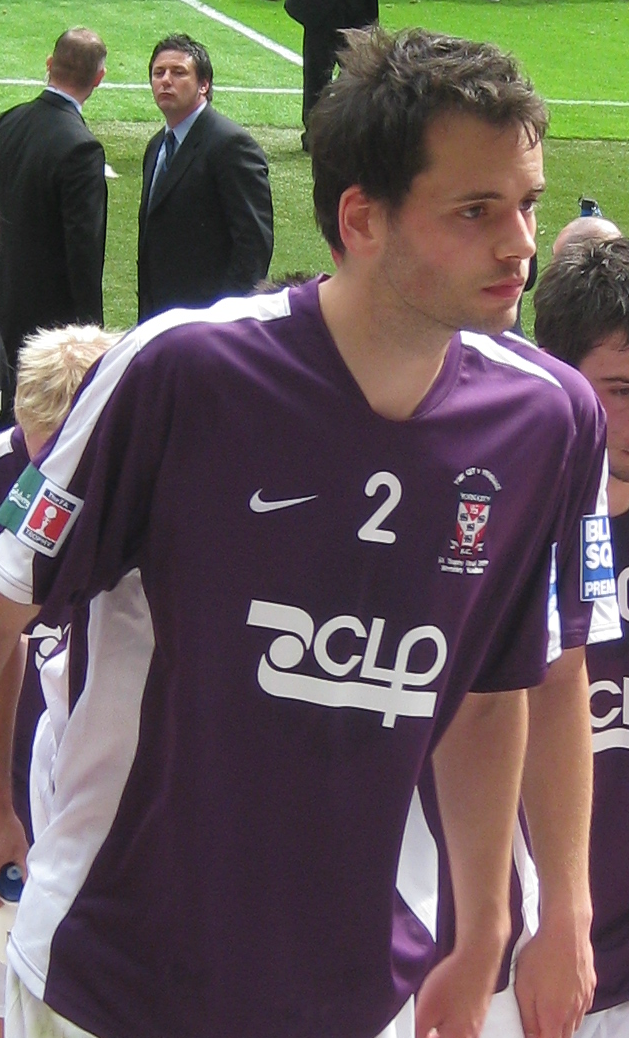
Ben Purkiss left at the end of the campaign.

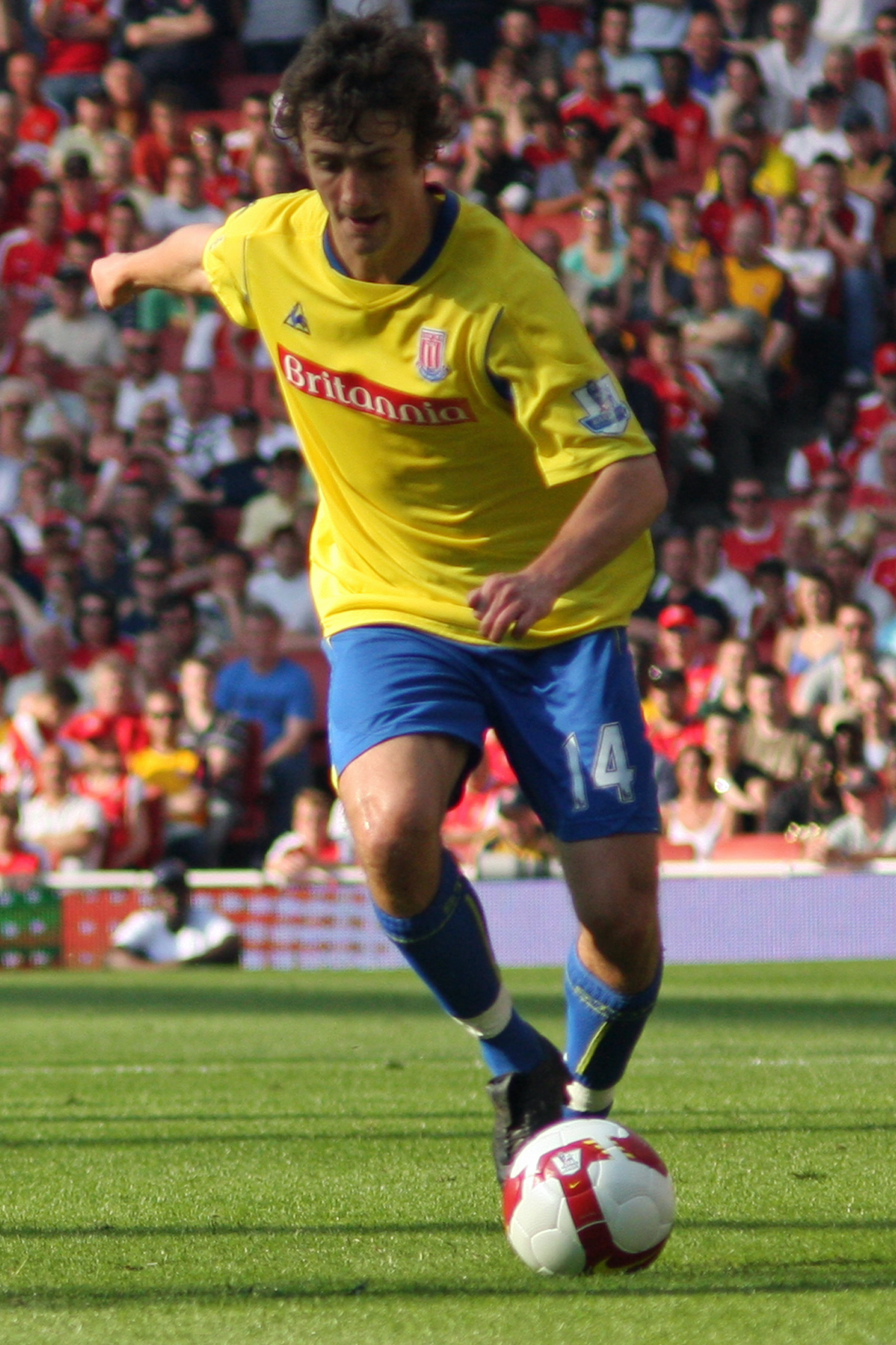
Danny Pugh signed in January.

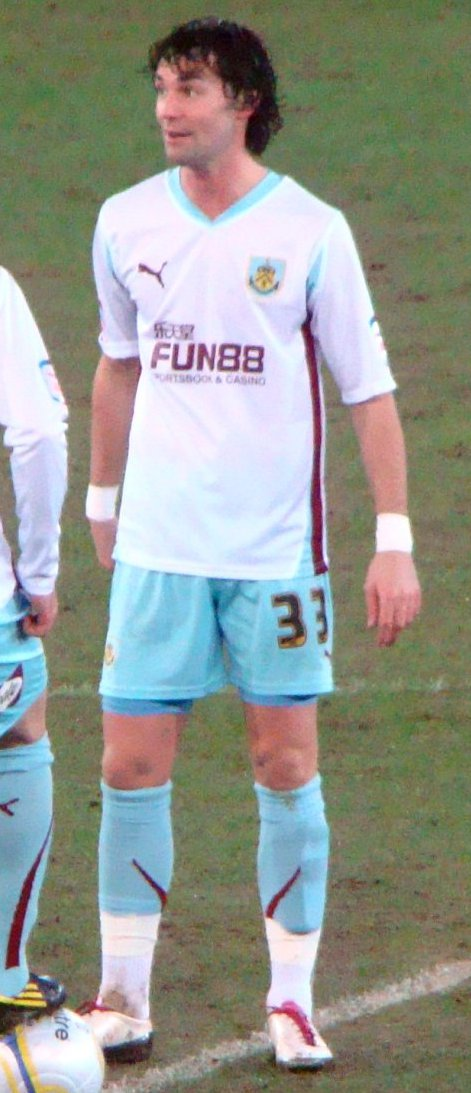
Chris Eagles was one of the few players to have impressed.

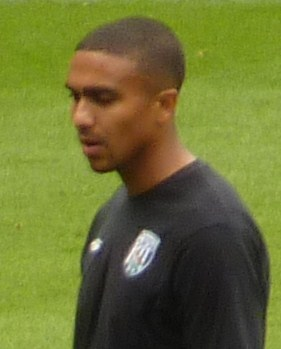
Jerome Thomas played well but struggled with injuries.

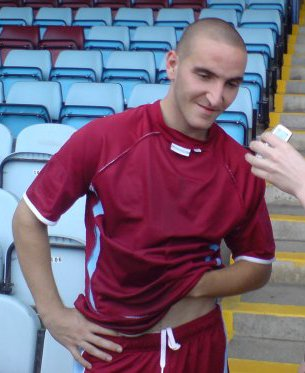
Martin Paterson scored only two goals from 18 games.

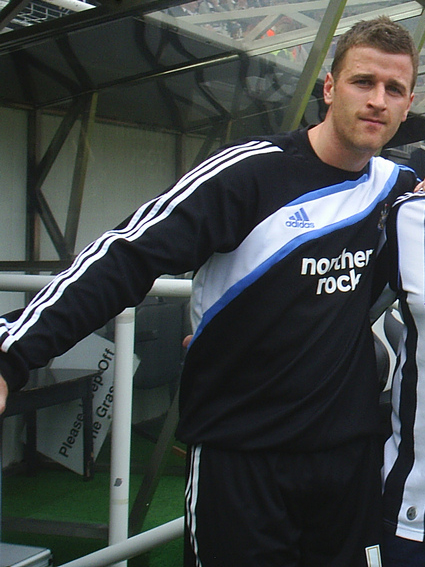
Ryan Taylor was signed twice.

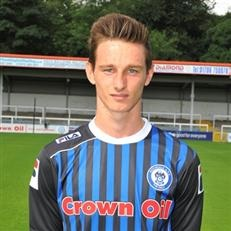
Scott Tanser featured 11 times.

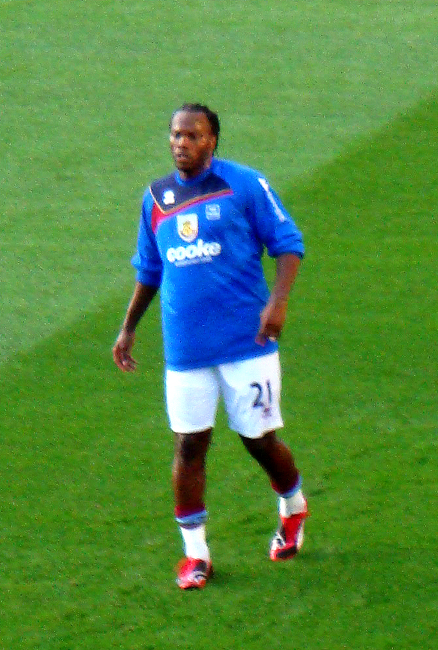
André Bikey made seven appearances.

== Overview ==
=== EFL League One ===
Following the decision of Rob Page to leave Port Vale to manage Northampton Town at the end of the 2015–16 campaign, many names were linked with the Vale job. Chairman Norman Smurthwaite hinted of three "outstanding" candidates, which The Sentinel reported as being Brian Little, Paul Dickov, and José Morais. Bookmakers initially listed Michael Brown as the odds-on favourite, before switching to Morais, then Shefki Kuqi, and then Bruno Ribeiro. Ribeiro was appointed as manager on 20 June, with Michael Brown as his assistant, and Peter Farrell as first-team coach. He made Dutch centre-back Kjell Knops his first signing of the season, who had spent the previous five years in the Eerste Divisie with MVV Maastricht. A day later, Curaçao under-20 striker Rigino Cicilia was signed after being released by Dutch side Roda JC Kerkrade. The next to join were French midfielders Quentin Pereira and Anthony de Freitas. Another Dutch-based centre-back, Calvin Mac-Intosch, was then signed from Cambuur.

The next trio to arrive were all Portuguese: midfielder Paulo Tavares and left-back Kiko, both from Vitória Setúbal, and striker Carlos Saleiro from Oriental. A ninth new arrival followed, Chris Mbamba, a Zimbabwean-born former Sweden under-17 international winger from Norwegian 2. divisjon club HamKam. A pair of English players then joined the club, former Premier League veteran winger Jerome Thomas and 22-year-old former Blackburn Rovers forward Anton Forrester. Bookmakers made Vale second favourites for relegation, though Smurthwaite intimated that he expected the club to reach the play-offs. Andy Smith was confirmed as the club's new first-team coach whilst the club decided to not hire Peter Farrell after all; Farrell only found out the news on his future after he heard it reported on the radio, and said "It would have been more respectful if someone had the decency to ring me up rather than leave it for 10 days". The club's Player of the Year, Anthony Grant, then submitted a transfer request. The playing squad however, continued to grow, with a 12th signing, Monaco reserve team captain Sébastien Amoros, signing a 12-month contract. The signing of 20-year-old midfielder Nathan Ferguson then took the club to 13 new players, and Ribeiro said he wanted to further expand the squad by securing the services of veteran trialist Nathan Tyson. However, he lost a player, as right-back Adam Yates was ruled out of action for seven months with an ankle cruciate ligament injury. Ribeiro broke with tradition by naming three players as joint-captains: goalkeeper Jak Alnwick, veteran full-back Ben Purkiss, and star midfielder Anthony Grant.

Nine players made their debut for the club on the opening day of the season at Valley Parade, as Vale held Bradford City to a 0–0 draw. Ribeiro planned to strengthen his team further though, and was hopeful of signing another goalkeeper, striker, winger and left-back. He achieved one of his targets by bringing in young Birmingham City striker Alex Jones on loan until January. Ribeiro went on to achieve his first win as Vale manager with a 2–0 victory over a poor Southend United side on 13 August. Despite only joining the club six weeks ago, Carlos Saleiro agreed to have his contract cancelled by mutual consent as he "found it difficult to adjust to life in the country". The good results kept coming though, and impressive young defender Nathan Smith scored a headed goal as Vale extending their run of league clean sheets to three games with a 1–0 win over Rochdale.> In a bizarre revelation, The Sun newspaper reported that Mario Balotelli could join the Vale on loan; the story was ridiculed by local journalists and fans on social media. Vale conceded their first league goal in a 1–0 defeat at Swindon Town on 20 August, despite Ribeiro's view that Vale were the better side on the day. Northampton Town boss Rob Page was allowed to sign JJ Hooper on a five-month loan deal starting from 22 August, after the striker began the season on the right-wing for Vale. Later that night a grenade was found at Vale Park, which was later determined to be a training device from World War II. With Kiko and Yates both injured, Ribeiro signed Liverpool Academy left-back Sam Hart on a season-long loan. He also signed 29-year-old former Northern Ireland striker Martin Paterson, who had been a free agent after leaving Blackpool. Vale continued their excellent start to the campaign by beating Scunthorpe United 3–1; substitutes Paterson, Hart and Amoros all made their first appearances for the club in the game, with the latter two players making their first appearances in professional football. Vale rounded off the month with two deadline day signings: Portuguese goalkeeper Miguel Santos from Benfica B and Swiss attacker Gëzim Shalaj from Enosis Neon Paralimni. Nathan Smith was named as the Football League Young Player of the Month for August.

Vale opened September by losing 4–1 to Bury in rain-soaked conditions at Gigg Lane; Ribeiro blamed himself for his players' poor performance, saying it was his job to instil the right attitude into the team before the match. Vale recovered and went on to claim a point at Peterborough United after Alex Jones converted a penalty in stoppage time to level the scores at 2–2. Visitors Gillingham led 1–0 at Vale Park on 17 September, before Vale turned round the game completely to achieve a 2–1 victory; manager Justin Edinburgh told the media that he believed the crowd had influenced the referee, to which Jerome Thomas responded on social media by displaying his bruised and bloodied shin. Vale then found themselves in the reverse situation at the Memorial Stadium, going from a 1–0 lead to an ultimate 2–1 defeat after Bristol Rovers equalised on 43 minutes. The perfect home form continued with a 3–1 victory over Millwall. Alex Jones was nominated for the EFL League One Player of the Month award for August and September after scoring six goals in eight games.

Coventry City manager Tony Mowbray resigned days before Coventry travelled to Vale Park for their fixture on 1 October. Vale were beaten 2–0 to lose their 100% home record and to give Coventry their first league win of the season. Vale's fixture at Milton Keynes Dons was shown live on Sky TV, and the Daily Mirror reported that Ribeiro paid £1,500 out of his own pocket to pay for a hotel stay for the team before the game as Smurthwaite refused to pay for the trip out of club funds. Smurthwaite refuted the newspaper's claim, saying he paid for the hotel accommodation out of his own pocket. The investment paid off as Vale scored their first goal at Stadium mk and recorded their first away victory of the season with a 1–0 win. However, they then put in a poor performance at Bramall Lane, losing 4–0 to Sheffield United despite United having three goals disallowed. They seemed to be heading for another defeat at home to Charlton Athletic, before they managed a late comeback to achieve a 1–1 draw. Former Wigan Athletic and Newcastle United defender Ryan Taylor then joined the club on a short-term deal. He made his debut at home to Oxford United, and scored the equalising goal from the penalty spot as Vale came back from two goals down at half-time; Oxford had dominated the game in the first half before Vale initiated a more direct game plan in the second half. Vale could not repeat the feat after going 3–0 down at high-flying Bolton Wanderers after 16 minutes, though did manage to score a consolation goal to make the score a respectable 3–1.

Vale moved back into the play-offs on 12 November after coming from behind to beat Fleetwood Town 2–1 at Vale Park. Fleetwood boss Uwe Rösler said that "Port Vale rode their luck today and I look like Father Christmas so they got a gift today from us". However, Grant was sent off for two bookable offences and suspended for a total of six games and fined £2,000 after he returned to the field after the match to argue with the referee on the full-time whistle. Vale then suffered a 2–0 defeat at Charlton, and dropped down to 11th-position. On 22 November, Vale came from behind at home to struggling Oldham Athletic to lead the game with a late strike from Cicilia, only for Oldham to score an equalising goal deep into stoppage time. They ended the month two points outside the play-offs after playing out a 0–0 draw with last-placed Shrewsbury Town.

Rob Page returned to Vale Park as manager of Northampton Town for the first time on 10 December, and masterminded a 3–2 victory to leapfrog the Vale, who sank to 15th place. The poor form worsened with a 4–0 defeat at AFC Wimbledon that could have been much heavier without some fine goalkeeping from Alnwick. This caused Smurthwaite to declare that 'Plan B' had been triggered, meaning the signing of "seasoned, higher grade" players, whilst he admitted he felt "a little bit hoodwinked" as Ribeiro's friends in the game (José Mourinho, Aitor Karanka, and Carlos Carvalhal) had provided him with glowing references but had thus far failed to lend any of their players to the Vale. Out of form Walsall then inflicted a 1–0 Boxing Day defeat on the Vale. This proved to be too much for Ribeiro, who announced his resignation hours later; Michael Brown was placed in temporary charge. Brown's first match in charge was a 1–0 home victory over Chesterfield.

Vale opened the new year at bottom club Oldham Athletic, and Alnwick made some excellent saves to secure a 0–0 draw and a point which moved the Vale two places up the table. However, Brown stated that the player's fitness rates were so low they were "alarming". Having allowed Santos and Hart to leave the club, Brown then signed veteran midfielder Chris Eagles on a short-term contract, and brought in 20-year loanee Callum Guy in from Derby County and 20-year striker Tyler Walker on loan from Nottingham Forest. Ryan Boot made his debut in goal and Eagles, Guy and Walker also made their debuts in a 2–2 home draw with Bury on 20 January; Walker scored the opening goal whilst Guy was named as man of the match. Brown went on to make a fourth signing in Rochdale full-back Scott Tanser. Vale twice took the lead away at high-flying Scunthorpe United, but went on to lose the game 3–2 with a penalty which Brown said had "never been a penalty in a million years". Brown further added to squad by signing 19-year-old Queens Park Rangers midfielders Olamide Shodipo and Axel Prohouly on loan until the end of the season. However, Rangers triggered Alnwick's £250,000 release clause, and his departure left the Vale without arguably their Player of the Season so far. Vale also sold reigning Player of the Year Anthony Grant to Peterborough United for an undisclosed "six-figure fee". Brown completed Vale's January transfer window by signing veteran midfielder Danny Pugh and bringing in goalkeeper Leo Fasan on loan from Celtic.

Vale welcomed back Grant with Peterborough United on 4 February – Fasan, Shodipo and Pugh all made their Vale debuts – and were beaten, 3–0, despite Fasan's man-of-the-match performance and his saving a penalty. Youth team goalkeeper Joe Slinn went on to turn professional at the club, becoming the fifth goalkeeper on the club's books. A Remie Streete header seemed to have handed Vale a comfortable win at Gillingham, but a Josh Parker header five minutes into injury time levelled the game at 1–1. Streete then fractured his leg in a 2–0 defeat at Millwall, as Vale dropped to just one place above the relegation zone. A 1–1 home draw with Bristol Rovers then allowed Bury to overtake Vale to leave Vale in the relegation zone for the first time in the season; the injury also crisis worsened as Walker left the pitch with a serious knee injury. Bradford City then came to Burslem to claim three points, with Alex Jones scoring his first goal in Bradford colours to make the final score 2–1. A waterlogged pitch at Rochdale on 28 February left the Vale powerless to prevent Swindon overtaking them and other relegation rivals to pick up points; Vale entered March five points from safety but with three game in hand.

Brown signed Vale's eighth goalkeeper of the season on 1 March after former Turkey youth international Deniz Mehmet agreed to a short-term contract. Vale then travelled to play-off chasing Southend United, and picked up a useful point after grinding out a 1–1 draw despite losing Pugh and Thomas to injury and having to hand a debut to youth team graduate Billy Reeves. Vale came from one goal down to record an important 3–2 victory at home to relegation rivals Swindon Town on 11 March. However, they went on to lose 2–1 at Northampton Town three days later – a damaging defeat as the two teams directly above the relegation zone (Bury and Oldham) both won to leave Vale five points short of safety. Brown acted on 17 March by bringing in former Cameroon international defender André Bikey and re-signing Ryan Taylor on contracts running until the end of the season. Later that evening, Taylor provided an assist and scored a goal as Vale claimed a crucial 2–1 home win over relegation rivals Shrewsbury Town. Vale had the chance to exit the relegation zone on 21 March, but put in a poor performance at the Ricoh Arena and conspired to become the only team to lose home and away to bottom club Coventry City that season. They missed another opportunity to overtake Shrewsbury in 20th-place four days later after playing out a 0–0 draw at home to MK Dons in front of a crowd of just 3,877.

Vale beat Wimbledon, 2–0, on 1 April to overtake Shrewsbury, Gillingham and Oldham and finish the day in 18th place. However, they lost 3–0 at Rochdale three days later, losing Pugh to a red card and Knops to a serious knee injury. Vale then suffered a 1–0 defeat at Chesterfield, which dropped them back into the relegation zone. League leaders Sheffield United ran out comfortable 3–0 winners in front of a season high 8,999 crowd – 4,330 of which were United fans – at Vale Park on Good Friday. Vale put in a decent performance away at Oxford United, but lost the game 2–0 after individual errors from Mehmet and then Smith handed easy chances to the home side.> Bolton Wanderers were Vale's final home opponents of the season in an eventful and disastrous game on 22 April, Cicilia was sent off in the first half for two bookable offences, and as Bolton took the lead after 66 minutes a pitch invasion from the away fans sparked a clash between both sets of fans as the players left the field whilst police restored order; the players returned to see out a 2–0 away win, and other results went against the Vale to leave them needing to win their final two games to stand any chance of survival. A late Chris Eagles strike at Walsall gave the Vale a 1–0 victory to keep their survival fight going until the final day of the season. In order to retain their League One status Vale had to beat Fleetwood on the final day and rely on either Gillingham failing to win at Northampton or Bury failing to pick up a point at Southend. Third-place Fleetwood were difficult opponents however, as they needed a win to stand a chance of securing automatic promotion, and manager Uwe Rosler said they "have to settle the score" after losing at Vale Park in November. Gillingham and Bury both dropped points, but Vale failed to take advantage as they saw out a 0–0 draw with Fleetwood.

Brown decided to release 10 players at the end of the season: Sébastien Amoros, Remie Streete, JJ Hooper, Sam Johnson, Sam Kelly, Ryan Lloyd, Deniz Mehmet, Harry Pickering, Scott Tanser, and Jerome Thomas; he also arranged deals with Rigino Cicilia, Kiko, Chris Mbamba, Quentin Pereira, and Paulo Tavares so that those five players could leave their contracts early. Sam Foley also left the club after rejecting the offer of a new contract. Ben Purkiss was the next to leave after he elected to join Swindon Town.

=== Finances & ownership issues ===
The club sold 3,344 season tickets, priced as low as £345 for adults, for the 2016–17 season; match day tickets were £23. Smurthwaite stated that the playing budget was around £1.3 million. A Norwegian hedge fund signed an exclusivity deal in view of purchasing the club on 16 June 2016. Smurthwaite stated that the hedge fund ended its interest after meeting with Ribeiro. Smurthwaite renewed his dispute with The Sentinel by banning the newspaper from attending the club's press conference where Ribeiro was unveiled as the club's new manager. He went on to appoint Colin Garlick as the club's CEO, and in January stated that "I'm only really involved now when it comes to prising open the sweetie jar for the money". In March, Smurthwaite used the OneValeFan fansite to ask supporters to vote whether he should sell the club to one of two hedge funds that he said had met his asking price for the club. The Sentinel revealed one interested party was a Norwegian company who proposed a sale figure of £6.5 million based on a valuation of Vale Park at £10 million, the playing squad at £5 million and expected crowds of 20,000 in the Championship. Smurthwaite said this information had been leaked by "some long standing fans" he had consulted for advice. He went on to issue a statement apologising for his decision to appoint Ribeiro and expressing regret at his attempts to communicate with fans over social media. He said there would be no further dialogue over social media, though "sadly I do not think this will change the activities of the keyboard warriors but at least they will now know that I will not be reading or responding to it".

Smurthwaite issued a statement on 2 May apologising for relegation, and stated that he would be stepping down as chairman and would no longer attend games as he looked to sell the club. Three days later, Burslem-based IT company Synectics Solutions's husband and wife owners Carol and Kevin Shanahan went public to announce they had made a bid of £1.25 million for the club. This bid was quickly matched by a local consortium fronted by property developer Kevin Jones, the owner and managing director of both ManorShop and ICL (International Computer Logistics) of Kidsgrove. Smurthwaite rejected both offers, saying that "I do not anticipate any further dialogue with either party with regard to the sale."

In April 2018, it was revealed that Port Vale had made a profit of £466,343 for the 2016–17 season, partly due to £390,000 in player sales and £100,000 in exclusivity payments.

=== Cup competitions ===
Vale faced a home tie with League Two side Stevenage in the first round of the FA Cup, and managed to progress by edging a narrow game 1–0, but were booed off by sections of the home support. Witnessed by a crowd of just 3,093 (only 173 of which were Stevenage fans), this was Vale's lowest attendance for a home FA Cup tie since 1906; this was despite ticket prices being almost halved to £12 on the day. They then cruised to a 4–0 victory at home to League Two side Hartlepool United to make it into the third round. Huddersfield Town, fourth in the Championship, proved far superior to the Vale in the third round, as they cruised to a 4–0 win at the John Smith's Stadium.

Vale were drawn away to League Two club Carlisle United in the first round of the newly re-branded EFL Cup and lost the game 2–1 after conceding two goals in a poor first half. In his post-match interview Ribeiro criticised his team's work rate, and said that "I am very disappointed with my players."

In the EFL Trophy, Vale were drawn in Northern Group E with Derby County under-23s, Doncaster Rovers (League Two), Mansfield Town (League Two). Only 1,198 spectators turned out to witness the opening victory over Derby County U23 – the second lowest ever attendance for a competitive fixture at Vale Park – as a Nathan Smith header secured a 1–0 win, though coach Andy Smith criticised the players for putting in a low-tempo performance. They went on to lose 1–0 at home to Mansfield Town in front of an even lower crowd of 1,075 – 29 more than the lowest ever attendance at Vale Park. Vale then failed to beat Doncaster, and were eliminated from the competition despite winning the penalty shoot-out that resulted from the 0–0 draw.

== Results ==
=== Pre-season ===
9 July 2016 Friendly	Newcastle Town	0–4	Port Vale	Newcastle-under-Lyme
		Report	Forrester 57', 63'; Hooper 59'; Lloyd 79'	Stadium: Lyme Valley Stadium; Attendance: 1,426; Referee: Dan Meeson

16 July 2016 Friendly	Kidsgrove Athletic	1–2	Port Vale	Kidsgrove
15:00	Clayton 71'	Report	Brown 79', 83'	Stadium: The Novus Stadium; Attendance: 1,157

19 July 2016 Friendly	Port Vale	0–2	Nottingham Forest	Burslem
19:45		Report	Mills 40'; Assombalonga 56'	Stadium: Vale Park; Attendance: 1,594

23 July 2016 Friendly	Port Vale	0–0	Wolverhampton Wanderers	Burslem
15:00		Report		Stadium: Vale Park; Attendance: 1,981

27 July 2016 Friendly	Port Vale	0–2	Birmingham City	Burslem
19:45		Report	Storer 74'; Caddis 84' (pen.)	Stadium: Vale Park; Referee: Mark Heywood

30 July 2016 Friendly	Port Vale	4–2	Manchester United XI	Burslem
15:00	Goss 15' (og.); Cicilia 45' (pen.), 61'; Foley 52'	Report	El-Fitouri 31'; Mitchell 84' (pen.)	Stadium: Vale Park; Attendance: 2,444

31 July 2016 Friendly	Sheffield Wednesday	3–0	Port Vale	Sheffield
16:30	Lees 15'; Forestieri 51'; Abdi 57'	Report		Stadium: Hillsborough Stadium; Attendance: 6,711

=== EFL League One ===
==== League table ====
Pos	Team	Pld	W	D	L	GF	GA	GD	Pts	Promotion, qualification or relegation
19	Bury	46	13	11	22	61	73	−12	50	
20	Gillingham	46	12	14	20	59	79	−20	50	
21	Port Vale (R)	46	12	13	21	45	70	−25	49	Relegation to EFL League Two
22	Swindon Town (R)	46	11	11	24	44	66	−22	44	Relegation to EFL League Two
23	Coventry City (R)	46	9	12	25	37	68	−31	39	Relegation to EFL League Two

Source: BBC Sport
Rules for classification: 1) Points; 2) Goal difference; 3) Number of goals scored
(R) Relegated

==== Results by matchday ====
Round	1	2	3	4	5	6	7	8	9	10	11	12	13	14	15	16	17	18	19	20	21	22	23	24	25	26	27	28	29	30	31	32	33	34	35	36	37	38	39	40	41	42	43	44	45	46
Ground	A	H	H	A	H	A	A	H	A	H	H	A	A	H	H	A	H	A	H	A	H	A	H	H	A	H	A	H	A	A	H	H	A	H	A	H	A	H	H	A	A	H	A	H	A	A
Result	D	W	W	L	W	L	D	W	L	W	L	W	L	D	D	L	W	L	D	D	L	L	L	W	D	D	L	L	D	L	D	L	D	W	L	W	L	D	W	L	L	L	L	L	W	D
Position	15	7	4	6	4	7	9	5	6	5	6	4	7	6	7	11	6	11	12	12	15	17	17	17	15	15	18	19	19	20	21	21	22	21	21	21	21	21	18	20	21	21	21	21	21	21
Points	1	4	7	7	10	10	11	14	14	17	17	20	20	21	22	22	25	25	26	27	27	27	27	30	31	32	32	32	33	33	34	34	35	38	38	41	41	42	45	45	45	45	45	45	48	49

Source: Statto
A = Away; H = Home; W = Win; D = Draw; L = Loss

==== Matches ====
6 August 2016 1	Bradford City	0–0	Port Vale	Bradford
15:00 BST		Report		Stadium: Valley Parade; Attendance: 18,558; Referee: Darren Deadman; Assistant referees: James Bell, Anthony Moore; Fourth official: Steven Copeland

13 August 2016 2	Port Vale	2–0	Southend United	Burslem
15:00 BST	Forrester 40'; Streete 75'	Report		Stadium: Vale Park; Attendance: 4,727; Referee: Lee Probert; Assistant referees: Andrew Fox, Timothy Wood; Fourth official: Marvyn Amphlett

16 August 2016 3	Port Vale	1–0	Rochdale	Burslem
19:45 BST	Smith 52'	Report		Stadium: Vale Park; Attendance: 3,941; Referee: Robert Jones; Assistant referees: Robert Atkin, David Benton; Fourth official: Mark Jones

20 August 2016 4	Swindon Town	1–0	Port Vale	Swindon
15:00 BST	Barry 47'	Report		Stadium: County Ground; Attendance: 6,182; Referee: Dean Whitestone; Assistant referees: Carl Fitch, Christopher Kidd; Fourth official: Louis Marks

27 August 2016 5	Port Vale	3–1	Scunthorpe United	Burslem
15:00 BST	Forrester 33'; Jones 49', 84'	Report	Morris 45+2'	Stadium: Vale Park; Attendance: 4,557; Referee: Brendan Malone; Assistant referees: Andrew Aylott, Christopher Ward; Fourth official: Danny Gratton

3 September 2016 6	Bury	4–1	Port Vale	Bury
15:00 BST	Vaughan 6', 30'; Mellis 22'; Hope 73'	Report	Smith 58'	Stadium: Gigg Lane; Attendance: 4,042; Referee: Ross Joyce; Assistant referees: Matthew Jones, Graeme Fyvie; Fourth official: Christopher Akers

10 September 2016 7	Peterborough United	2–2	Port Vale	Peterborough
15:00 BST	Moncur 8', 84'	Report	Jones 6', 90+4' (pen.)	Stadium: London Road Stadium; Attendance: 4,711; Referee: Graham Horwood; Assistant referees: Rob Smith, Marc Wilson; Fourth official: Declan Ford

17 September 2016 8	Port Vale	2–1	Gillingham	Burslem
15:00 BST	Streete 76'; Jones 84'	Report	Wright 25'	Stadium: Vale Park; Attendance: 4,719; Referee: Carl Boyeson; Assistant referees: Matt Eva, Natalie Aspinall; Fourth official: Scott Oldham

24 September 2016 9	Bristol Rovers	2–1	Port Vale	Bristol
15:00 BST	Harrison 43'; Easter 62' (pen.)	Report	Paterson 23'	Stadium: Memorial Stadium; Attendance: 9,088; Referee: Trevor Kettle; Assistant referees: Andy Newbold, David Plowright; Fourth official: Steven Plane

27 September 2016 10	Port Vale	3–1	Millwall	Burslem
19:45 BST	Jones 4'; Paterson 59'; Streete 71'	Report	Gregory 84' (pen.)	Stadium: Vale Park; Attendance: 3,934; Referee: Jeremy Simpson; Assistant referees: Tony Peart, Stephen Wade; Fourth official: Dumitru-Ravel Cheosiaua

1 October 2016 11	Port Vale	0–2	Coventry City	Burslem
15:00 BST		Report	Sordell 36'; McCann 72'	Stadium: Vale Park; Attendance: 5,605; Referee: John Busby; Assistant referees: Peter Gibbons, Richard Wild; Fourth official: Darren Strain

9 October 2016 12	Milton Keynes Dons	0–1	Port Vale	Milton Keynes
14:15 BST		Report	Jones 35'	Stadium: Stadium mk Attendance: 8,259; Referee: Seb Stockbridge; Assistant referees: Craig Taylor, Ashvin Degnarain; Fourth official: Brett Huxtable

15 October 2016 13	Sheffield United	4–0	Port Vale	Sheffield
15:00 BST	Ebanks-Landell 23', 45'; Duffy 62'; Scougall 83'	Report		Stadium: Bramall Lane; Attendance: 19,699; Referee: Mark Heywood; Assistant referees: Geoffrey Liddle, David Plowright; Fourth official: Robert Jones

18 October 2016 14	Port Vale	1–1	Charlton Athletic	Burslem
19:45 BST	Jones 85' (pen.)	Report	Ulvestad 30'	Stadium: Vale Park; Attendance: 3,494; Referee: Graham Salisbury; Assistant referees: Gary Hilton, Anthony Moore; Fourth official: Ben Toner

22 October 2016 15	Port Vale	2–2	Oxford United	Burslem
15:00 BST	Cicilia 54'; Taylor 59' (pen.)	Report	Dunkley 11'; Crowley 19'	Stadium: Vale Park; Attendance: 4,837; Referee: Ben Toner; Assistant referees: Nicholas Barnard, Ian Dudley; Fourth official: Matthew Bristow

29 October 2016 16	Bolton Wanderers	3–1	Port Vale	Bolton
15:00 BST	Clough 7'; Vela 11'; Wilson 16'	Report	Hart 73'	Stadium: Macron Stadium; Attendance: 13,937; Referee: Nigel Miller; Assistant referees: Alan Clayton, Christopher Ward; Fourth official: Anthony Backhouse

12 November 2016 17	Port Vale	2–1	Fleetwood Town	Burslem
15:00 BST	Cicilia 75'; Jones 86'	Report	Long 52'	Stadium: Vale Park; Attendance: 3,890; Referee: John Brooks; Assistant referees: Michael Denton, Brian Durie; Fourth official: Andy Hendley

19 November 2016 18	Charlton Athletic	2–0	Port Vale	Charlton, London
15:00 BST	Magennis 30'; Ajose 44'	Report		Stadium: The Valley; Attendance: 8,992; Referee: Richard Clark; Assistant referees: Colin Lymer, Adrian Waters; Fourth official: Christopher Wade

22 November 2016 19	Port Vale	2–2	Oldham Athletic	Burslem
19:45 BST	Streete 51'; Cicilia 78'	Report	Banks 48'; Winchester 90+4'	Stadium: Vale Park; Attendance: 3,152; Referee: Darren England; Assistant referees: Nicholas Barnard, Joe Simpson; Fourth official: Mark Heywood

26 November 2016 20	Shrewsbury Town	0–0	Port Vale	Shrewsbury
15:00 BST		Report		Stadium: New Meadow; Attendance: 5,429; Referee: Scott Duncan; Assistant referees: Andrew Fox, Jonathan Hunt; Fourth official: Simon Mather

10 December 2016 21	Port Vale	2–3	Northampton Town	Burslem
15:00 BST	Taylor 52'; Cicilia 90+2'	Report	Zakuani 22'; Hoskins 78'; Anderson 90'	Stadium: Vale Park; Attendance: 4,739; Referee: Graham Salisbury; Assistant referees: Alan Clayton, Paul Graham; Fourth official: Christopher Akers

17 December 2016 22	AFC Wimbledon	4–0	Port Vale	Kingston upon Thames
15:00 BST	Poleon 53'; Elliott 58'; Barnett 85'; Robertson 89'	Report		Stadium: Kingsmeadow; Attendance: 4,291; Referee: Brendan Malone; Assistant referees: Christopher Husband, Garry Maskell; Fourth official: Elliott Kaye

26 December 2016 23	Port Vale	0–1	Walsall	Burslem
15:00 BST		Report	Laird 27'	Stadium: Vale Park; Attendance: 5,854; Referee: Darren Deadman; Assistant referees: James Mainwaring, Matthew Jones; Fourth official: Robert Jones

30 December 2016 24	Port Vale	1–0	Chesterfield	Burslem
19:45 GMT	Thomas 61'	Report		Stadium: Vale Park; Attendance: 4,027; Referee: Michael Salisbury; Assistant referees: Andy Newbold, Duncan Street; Fourth official: Ian Dudley

2 January 2017 25	Oldham Athletic	0–0	Port Vale	Oldham
15:00 BST		Report		Stadium: Boundary Park; Attendance: 3,451; Referee: Richard Clark; Assistant referees: Gary Hilton, Barry Gordon; Fourth official: David Benton

20 January 2017 26	Port Vale	2–2	Bury	Burslem
19:45 BST	Walker 20'; Taylor 45+4' (pen.)	Report	Vaughan 40', 55'	Stadium: Vale Park; Attendance: 4,338; Referee: Oliver Langford; Assistant referees: Akil Howson, Christopher Akers; Fourth official: Michael Salisbury

28 January 2017 27	Scunthorpe United	3–2	Port Vale	Scunthorpe
15:00 BST	Morris 49' (pen.); Toney 62'; Hopper 71'	Report	Walker 38'; Hooper 59'	Stadium: Glanford Park; Attendance: 4,442; Referee: Darren England; Assistant referees: Alan Young, Nigel Smith; Fourth official: Paul Thompson

4 February 2017 28	Port Vale	0–3	Peterborough United	Burslem
15:00 BST		Report	Maddison 20'; Morias 90', 90+5'	Stadium: Vale Park; Attendance: 4,259; Referee: Charles Breakspear; Assistant referees: Dumitru-Ravel Cheosiaua, Paul Graham; Fourth official: Michael D'Aguilar

11 February 2017 29	Gillingham	1–1	Port Vale	Gillingham, Kent
15:00 BST	Maddison 20'	Report	Parker 49'	Stadium: Priestfield Stadium; Attendance: 4,942; Referee: Nick Kinseley; Assistant referees: Michael Webb, Joe Simpson; Fourth official: Ashvin Degnarain

14 February 2017 30	Millwall	2–0	Port Vale	South Bermondsey
19:45 BST	O'Brien 26'; Cooper 52'	Report		Stadium: The Den; Attendance: 7,032; Referee: Darren Drysdale; Assistant referees: Stuart Butler, Kevin Howick; Fourth official: Anthony Da Costa

18 February 2017 31	Port Vale	1–1	Bristol Rovers	Burslem
15:00 BST	Harris 54' (og.)	Report	Bodin 78'	Stadium: Vale Park; Attendance: 4,460; Referee: Dean Whitestone; Assistant referees: Kevin Morris, Matthew Parry; Fourth official: Simon Mather

25 February 2017 32	Port Vale	1–2	Bradford City	Burslem
15:00 BST	Hooper 58'	Report	Vincelot 41'; Jones 74'	Stadium: Vale Park; Attendance: 4,953; Referee: Mark Heywood; Assistant referees: David Plowright, Nigel Smith; Fourth official: Michael Salisbury

4 March 2017 33	Southend United	1–1	Port Vale	Southend-on-Sea
15:00 BST	Wordsworth 83'	Report	Eagles 78'	Stadium: Roots Hall; Attendance: 7,545; Referee: Nigel Miller; Assistant referees: Ian Rathbone, Matthew Lee; Fourth official: Darren Blunden

11 March 2017 34	Port Vale	3–2	Swindon Town	Burslem
15:00 BST	Eagles 36'; Hooper 50', 87'	Report	Obika 35'; Norris 90'	Stadium: Vale Park; Attendance: 4,510; Referee: Geoff Eltringham; Assistant referees: James Mainwaring, Adam Matthews; Fourth official: Graham Horwood

14 March 2017 35	Northampton Town	2–1	Port Vale	Northampton
19:45 BST	Phillips 63'; Taylor 88'	Report	Hooper 73'	Stadium: Sixfields Stadium; Attendance: 4,812; Referee: Gavin Ward; Assistant referees: Craig Hicks, Garry Maskell; Fourth official: Chris Sarginson

17 March 2017 36	Port Vale	2–1	Shrewsbury Town	Burslem
19:45 BST	Foley 65'; Taylor 68'	Report	Dodds 73'	Stadium: Vale Park; Attendance: 4,626; Referee: Ross Joyce; Assistant referees: Alix Pashley, Christopher Husband; Fourth official: Ian Dudley

21 March 2017 37	Coventry City	2–1	Port Vale	Coventry
19:45	Reid 37'; Thomas 41'	Report	Smith 74'	Stadium: Ricoh Arena; Attendance: 7,695; Referee: David Webb; Assistant referees: Matthew Bristow, Andy Hendley; Fourth official: Graham Horwood

25 March 2017 38	Port Vale	0–0	Milton Keynes Dons	Burslem
15:00 BST	Smith 21'; Eagles 69'	Report		Stadium: Vale Park; Attendance: 3,877; Referee: Kevin Johnson; Assistant referees: Ricky Wootton, Peter Gibbons; Fourth official: Marvyn Amphlett

1 April 2017 39	Port Vale	2–0	AFC Wimbledon	Burslem
15:00 BST		Report		Stadium: Vale Park; Attendance: 4,308; Referee: Darren Drysdale; Assistant referees: Bob Roberts, Paul Graham; Fourth official: Duncan Street

4 April 2017 40	Rochdale	3–0	Port Vale	Rochdale
19:45 BST	Lund 33'; McDermott 42'; Henderson 45+5' (pen.)	Report		Stadium: Spotland Stadium; Attendance: 4,387; Referee: Seb Stockbridge; Assistant referees: Gareth Mellor, Alf Greenwood; Fourth official: Darren Strain

8 April 2017 41	Chesterfield	1–0	Port Vale	Chesterfield
15:00 BST	Rowley 54'	Report		Stadium: Proact Stadium; Attendance: 5,527; Referee: Richard Clark; Assistant referees: Barry Gordon, Michael D'Aguilar; Fourth official: Peter Gooch

14 April 2017 42	Port Vale	0–3	Sheffield United	Burslem
15:00 BST		Report	O'Shea 2'; Clarke 30'; Done 90+3'	Stadium: Vale Park; Attendance: 8,999; Referee: Nick Kinseley; Assistant referees: Chris Isherwood, Natalie Aspinall; Fourth official: Nick Gibbons

17 April 2017 43	Oxford United	2–0	Port Vale	Oxford
15:00 BST	Ruffels 14'; Maguire 82'	Report		Stadium: Kassam Stadium; Attendance: 7,646; Referee: Trevor Kettle; Assistant referees: Daniel Cook, Sam Purkiss; Fourth official: Dumitru-Ravel Cheosiaua

22 April 2017 44	Port Vale	0–2	Bolton Wanderers	Burslem
15:00 BST		Report	Wheater 66'; Madine 90'	Stadium: Vale Park; Attendance: 8,890; Referee: Carl Boyeson; Assistant referees: Geoffrey Liddle, Andy Hendley; Fourth official: Ricky Wootton

25 April 2017 45	Walsall	0–1	Port Vale	Walsall
19:45		Report	Eagles 85'	Stadium: Bescot Stadium; Attendance: 4,266; Referee: John Busby; Assistant referees: Joe Simpson, Matthew Bristow; Fourth official: Mark Heywood

30 April 2017 46	Fleetwood Town	0–0	Port Vale	Fleetwood
12:00 BST		Report		Stadium: Highbury Stadium; Attendance: 4,733; Referee: Ross Joyce; Assistant referees: Matthew Jones, Paul Marsden; Fourth official: Gareth Mellor

=== FA Cup ===
5 November 2016 R1	Port Vale	1–0	Stevenage	Burslem
15:00 GMT	Streete 38'	Report		Stadium: Vale Park; Attendance: 3,093; Referee: Mark Haywood; Assistant referees: Nigel Smith, Mark Griffiths; Fourth official: Richard Bartlett

4 December 2016 R2	Port Vale	4–0	Hartlepool United	Burslem
15:00 GMT	Cicilia 12'; Woods 14' (og.); Jones 31'; Taylor 56' (pen.)	Report		Stadium: Vale Park; Attendance: 3,514; Referee: Darren Handley; Assistant referees: Bob Roberts, Paul Hobday; Fourth official: Akil Howson

7 January 2017 R3	Huddersfield Town	4–0	Port Vale	Huddersfield
15:00 GMT	Payne 28', 84'; Palmer 73'; Bunn 80'	Report		Stadium: John Smith's Stadium; Attendance: 11,715; Referee: Geoff Eltringham; Assistant referees: Jonathan Hunt, James Bell; Fourth official: Ben Toner

=== EFL Cup ===
9 August 2016 R1	Carlisle United	2–1	Port Vale	Carlisle
19:45 BST	Wyke 27'; Miller 41'	Report	Grant 51'	Stadium: Brunton Park; Attendance: 3,363; Referee: Mark Haywood; Assistant referees: Barry Gordon, Barry Cropp; Fourth official: Helen Byrne

=== EFL Trophy ===
Pos	Div	Team	Pld	W	PW	PL	L	GF	GA	GD	Pts	Qualification
1	L2	Doncaster Rovers	3	1	1	1	0	4	2	+2	6	Advance to Round 2
2	L2	Mansfield Town	3	2	0	0	1	4	4	0	6	Advance to Round 2
3	L1	Port Vale	3	1	1	0	1	1	1	0	5	
4	ACA	Derby County U21	3	0	0	1	2	4	6	−2	1	

Source: Sky Sports

30 August 2016 Group Stage	Port Vale	1–0	Derby County U23	Burslem
19:45 BST	Smith 80'	Report		Stadium: Vale Park; Attendance: 1,198; Referee: Mark Heywood; Assistant referees: Michael Denton, Chris Isherwood; Fourth official: Matthew Parry

4 October 2016 Group Stage	Port Vale	0–1	Mansfield Town	Burslem
19:45 BST		Report	Green 66'	Stadium: Vale Park; Attendance: 1,025; Referee: Michael Salisbury; Assistant referees: Duncan Street, Lisa Rashid; Fourth official: Paul Graham

8 November 2016 Group Stage	Doncaster Rovers	0–0 (3–4 p)	Port Vale	Doncaster
19:45 BST		Report		Stadium: Keepmoat Stadium; Attendance: 1,495; Referee: Geoff Eltringham; Assistant referees: William Smallwood, Alix Pashley; Fourth official: Tom Nield
	Penalties
	Houghton (penalty scored); Evina (penalty missed); Longbottom (penalty missed); Mandeville (penalty scored); Keegan (penalty scored)		Streete (penalty scored); Grant (penalty missed); Paulo Tavares (penalty scored); Pereira (penalty scored); Hart (penalty scored)

== Squad statistics ==
=== Appearances and goals ===
Key to positions: GK – Goalkeeper; DF – Defender; MF – Midfielder; FW – Forward

No.	Pos	Nat	Player	Total		EFL League One		FA Cup		EFL Cup		EFL Trophy	
No.	Pos	Nat	Player	Apps	Goals	Apps	Goals	Apps	Goals	Apps	Goals	Apps	Goals
1	GK	(Turkey) TUR	Deniz Mehmet	9	0	9	0	0	0	0	0	0	0
2	DF	(England) ENG	Ben Purkiss	36	0	32	0	1	0	1	0	2	0
3	DF	(England) ENG	Adam Yates	0	0	0	0	0	0	0	0	0	0
4	DF	(England) ENG	Remie Streete	42	6	37	5	3	1	0	0	2	0
5	DF	(Netherlands) NED	Kjell Knops	32	0	29	0	2	0	1	0	0	0
6	DF	(England) ENG	Ryan Taylor	25	5	22	4	3	1	0	0	0	0
7	MF	(England) ENG	Sam Kelly	26	0	21	0	3	0	1	0	1	0
8	MF	(Portugal) POR	Paulo Tavares	26	0	22	0	2	0	0	0	2	0
9	FW	(Curaçao) CUW	Rigino Cicilia	35	5	29	4	3	1	0	0	3	0
10	FW	(England) ENG	JJ Hooper	24	5	23	5	0	0	1	0	0	0
11	MF	(Republic of Ireland) IRL	Sam Foley	33	1	32	1	0	0	1	0	0	0
12	MF	(England) ENG	Danny Pugh	14	0	14	0	0	0	0	0	0	0
13	MF	(France) FRA	Axel Prohouly	0	0	0	0	0	0	0	0	0	0
14	MF	(England) ENG	Jerome Thomas	26	1	23	1	2	0	1	0	0	0
15	FW	(England) ENG	Anton Forrester	24	2	21	2	1	0	1	0	1	0
16	MF	(Sweden) SWE	Chris Mbamba	11	0	6	0	1	0	1	0	3	0
17	MF	(England) ENG	Michael Brown	3	0	3	0	0	0	0	0	0	0
18	FW	(England) ENG	Dan Turner	18	0	16	0	0	0	0	0	2	0
19	DF	(England) ENG	Scott Tanser	11	0	11	0	0	0	0	0	0	0
20	DF	(Portugal) POR	Kiko	26	0	21	0	2	0	0	0	3	0
21	MF	(France) FRA	Quentin Pereira	17	0	14	0	0	0	0	0	3	0
22	MF	(England) ENG	Ryan Lloyd	0	0	0	0	0	0	0	0	0	0
23	GK	(England) ENG	Ryan Boot	1	0	1	0	0	0	0	0	0	0
24	DF	(England) ENG	Nathan Smith	53	5	46	4	3	0	1	0	3	1
25	MF	(England) ENG	Callum Guy	11	0	11	0	0	0	0	0	0	0
26	FW	(England) ENG	Tyler Walker	6	2	6	2	0	0	0	0	0	0
27	MF	(France) FRA	Sébastien Amoros	13	0	10	0	1	0	0	0	2	0
28	MF	(France) FRA	Anthony de Freitas	29	0	24	0	3	0	1	0	1	0
30	MF	(Switzerland) SUI	Gëzim Shalaj	9	0	7	0	1	0	0	0	1	0
31	MF	(Wales) WAL	Billy Reeves	12	0	12	0	0	0	0	0	0	0
32	GK	(England) ENG	Harry Pickering	0	0	0	0	0	0	0	0	0	0
33	DF	(England) ENG	Luke Dennis	0	0	0	0	0	0	0	0	0	0
34	DF	(England) ENG	James Gibbons	1	0	0	0	1	0	0	0	0	0
38	GK	(Italy) ITA	Leo Fasan	10	0	10	0	0	0	0	0	0	0
39	DF	(Cameroon) CMR	André Bikey	7	0	7	0	0	0	0	0	0	0
44	MF	(England) ENG	Chris Eagles	20	4	20	4	0	0	0	0	0	0
46	MF	(Republic of Ireland) IRL	Olamide Shodipo	6	0	6	0	0	0	0	0	0	0
50	GK	(England) ENG	Sam Johnson	0	0	0	0	0	0	0	0	0	0
	GK	(England) ENG	Joe Slinn	0	0	0	0	0	0	0	0	0	0
Players who featured but departed the club during the season:
1	GK	(England) ENG	Jak Alnwick	31	0	26	0	3	0	1	0	1	0
6	DF	(Suriname) SUR	Calvin Mac-Intosch	6	0	3	0	0	0	1	0	2	0
12	MF	(Grenada) GRN	Nathan Ferguson	1	0	0	0	0	0	0	0	1	0
13	FW	(Northern Ireland) NIR	Martin Paterson	18	2	16	2	1	0	0	0	1	0
19	MF	(England) ENG	Omar Haughton	0	0	0	0	0	0	0	0	0	0
25	GK	(Portugal) POR	Miguel Santos	3	0	0	0	1	0	0	0	2	0
26	FW	(England) ENG	Alex Jones	21	10	19	9	1	1	0	0	1	0
39	FW	(Portugal) POR	Carlos Saleiro	1	0	0	0	0	0	1	0	0	0
42	MF	(Jamaica) JAM	Anthony Grant	24	1	20	0	2	0	1	1	1	0
46	DF	(England) ENG	Sam Hart	16	1	11	1	2	0	0	0	3	0

=== Top scorers ===
Place	Position	Nation	Number	Name	EFL League One	FA Cup	EFL Cup	EFL Trophy	Total
1	FW	England	26	Alex Jones	9	1	0	0	10
2	DF	England	4	Remie Streete	5	1	0	0	6
3	FW	Curaçao	9	Rigino Cicilia	4	1	0	0	5
–	FW	England	10	JJ Hooper	5	0	0	0	5
–	DF	England	24	Nathan Smith	4	0	0	1	5
–	DF	England	40	Ryan Taylor	4	1	0	0	5
7	MF	England	44	Chris Eagles	4	0	0	0	4
8	FW	England	15	Anton Forrester	2	0	0	0	2
–	FW	Northern Ireland	13	Martin Paterson	2	0	0	0	2
–	FW	England	26	Tyler Walker	2	0	0	0	2
11	MF	Ireland	11	Sam Foley	1	0	0	0	1
–	MF	Jamaica	42	Anthony Grant	0	0	1	0	1
–	DF	England	46	Sam Hart	1	0	0	0	1
–	MF	England	14	Jerome Thomas	1	0	0	0	1
–				Own goals	1	1	0	0	2
				TOTALS	45	5	1	1	52

=== Disciplinary record ===
Number	Nation	Position	Name	EFL League One		FA Cup		EFL Cup		EFL Trophy		Total	
Number	Nation	Position	Name	Yellow card	Red card	Yellow card	Red card	Yellow card	Red card	Yellow card	Red card	Yellow card	Red card
42	Jamaica	MF	Anthony Grant	8	1	1	0	1	0	0	0	10	1
9	Curaçao	DF	Rigino Cicilia	3	1	0	0	0	0	1	0	4	1
12	England	MF	Danny Pugh	3	1	0	0	0	0	0	0	3	1
5	Netherlands	DF	Kjell Knops	9	0	0	0	1	0	0	0	10	0
4	England	DF	Remie Streete	8	0	0	0	0	0	0	0	8	0
8	Portugal	MF	Paulo Tavares	8	0	0	0	0	0	0	0	8	0
40	England	DF	Ryan Taylor	6	0	0	0	0	0	0	0	6	0
46	England	DF	Sam Hart	4	0	0	0	0	0	1	0	5	0
26	England	FW	Alex Jones	5	0	0	0	0	0	0	0	5	0
13	Northern Ireland	FW	Martin Paterson	4	0	0	0	0	0	0	0	4	0
24	England	DF	Nathan Smith	2	0	1	0	0	0	1	0	4	0
14	England	MF	Jerome Thomas	4	0	0	0	0	0	0	0	4	0
27	France	MF	Sébastien Amoros	2	0	0	0	0	0	1	0	3	0
39	Cameroon	DF	André Bikey	3	0	0	0	0	0	0	0	3	0
7	England	MF	Sam Kelly	3	0	0	0	0	0	0	0	3	0
20	Portugal	DF	Kiko	2	0	0	0	0	0	1	0	3	0
11	Ireland	MF	Sam Foley	3	0	0	0	0	0	0	0	3	0
1	England	GK	Jak Alnwick	2	0	0	0	0	0	0	0	2	0
44	England	MF	Chris Eagles	2	0	0	0	0	0	0	0	2	0
25	England	MF	Callum Guy	2	0	0	0	0	0	0	0	2	0
6	Suriname	DF	Calvin Mac-Intosch	1	0	0	0	1	0	0	0	2	0
31	Wales	MF	Billy Reeves	2	0	0	0	0	0	0	0	2	0
17	England	MF	Michael Brown	1	0	0	0	0	0	0	0	1	0
28	France	MF	Anthony de Freitas	1	0	0	0	0	0	0	0	1	0
38	Italy	GK	Leo Fasan	1	0	0	0	0	0	0	0	1	0
10	England	FW	JJ Hooper	1	0	0	0	0	0	0	0	1	0
2	England	DF	Ben Purkiss	1	0	0	0	0	0	0	0	1	0
18	England	FW	Dan Turner	1	0	0	0	0	0	0	0	1	0
			TOTALS	92	3	2	0	3	0	5	0	102	3

Sourced from Soccerway.

== Awards ==
End of Season Awards	Winner
Player of the Year	Nathan Smith
Away Travel Player of the Year	Nathan Smith
Supporters' Club's Trophy	Nathan Smith
Players' Player of the Year	Nathan Smith
Young Player of the Year	Nathan Smith
Community Foundation Trust Player of the Year	Adam Yates
Youth Player of the Year	Mike Calveley
Goal of the Season	Chris Eagles (vs Walsall, 25 April 2017)

== Transfers ==
=== Transfers in ===
Date from	Position	Nationality	Name	From	Fee	Ref.
1 July 2016 (Note: The transfer was announced on 30 June and would become official on 1 July once his contract at Roda JC expired)	CF	CUW	Rigino Cicilia	(Netherlands) Roda JC	Free transfer	
1 July 2016	CM	FRA	Anthony de Freitas	(France) Monaco	Free transfer	
1 July 2016 (Note: The transfer was announced on 28 June and would become official on 1 July once his contract at MVV Maastricht expired)	CB	NED	Kjell Knops	(Netherlands) MVV Maastricht	Free transfer	
1 July 2016	CB	SUR	Calvin Mac-Intosch	(Netherlands) Cambuur	£20,000	
1 July 2016	CM	FRA	Quentin Pereira	(France) RC Épernay Champagne	Free transfer	
5 July 2016	LB	POR	Kiko	(Portugal) Vitória Setúbal	Free transfer	
5 July 2016	CF	POR	Carlos Saleiro	(Portugal) Oriental	Free transfer	
5 July 2016	CM	POR	Paulo Tavares	(Portugal) Vitória Setúbal	Free transfer	
9 July 2016	LW	SWE	Chris Mbamba	(Norway) HamKam	Free transfer	
12 July 2016	CF	ENG	Anton Forrester	Blackburn Rovers	Free transfer	
12 July 2016	LW	ENG	Jerome Thomas	Rotherham United	Free transfer	
20 July 2016	CM	FRA	Sébastien Amoros	(France) Monaco	Free transfer	
26 July 2016	CM	GRN	Nathan Ferguson	Burton Albion	Free transfer	
26 August 2016	CF	NIR	Martin Paterson	Blackpool	Free transfer	
31 August 2016	GK	POR	Miguel Santos	(Portugal) Benfica B	Free transfer	
31 August 2016	CM	SWI	Gëzim Shalaj	(Cyprus) Enosis Neon Paralimni	Free transfer	
21 October 2016	RB	ENG	Ryan Taylor	Hull City	Free transfer	
11 January 2017	RW	ENG	Chris Eagles	Accrington Stanley	Free transfer	
27 January 2017	LB	ENG	Scott Tanser	Rochdale	Free transfer	
31 January 2017	CM	ENG	Danny Pugh	Blackpool	Free transfer	
1 March 2017	GK	TUR	Deniz Mehmet	(Scotland) Falkirk	Free transfer	
17 March 2017	CB	CMR	André Bikey	(India) FC Pune City	Free transfer	
17 March 2017	RB	ENG	Ryan Taylor	Port Vale	Free transfer	

=== Transfers out ===
Date from	Position	Nationality	Name	To	Fee	Ref.
16 August 2016	CF	POR	Carlos Saleiro		Mutual consent	
27 December 2016	CF	NIR	Martin Paterson	(United States) Tampa Bay Rowdies	Contract expired	
10 January 2017	GK	POR	Miguel Santos	(Netherlands) Fortuna Sittard	Mutual consent	
20 January 2017	CB	SUR	Calvin Mac-Intosch	(Netherlands) Almere City	Mutual consent	
20 January 2017	LW	ENG	Omar Haughton	Stafford Rangers	Mutual consent	
27 January 2017	RB	ENG	Ryan Taylor	Port Vale	Contract expired	
30 January 2017	GK	ENG	Jak Alnwick	(Scotland) Rangers	£250,000	
30 January 2017	CM	GRN	Nathan Ferguson	Bromley	Mutual consent	
31 January 2017	CM	JAM	Anthony Grant	Peterborough United	"six-figure fee"	
1 May 2017	CM	FRA	Sébastien Amoros	(France) RC Grasse	Released	
4 May 2017	CB	ENG	Remie Streete		Released	
19 May 2017	CF	CUW	Rigino Cicilia	(Lithuania) FK Sūduva	Mutual consent	
19 May 2017	CF	ENG	JJ Hooper	Grimsby Town	Released	
19 May 2017	GK	ENG	Sam Johnson	FC Halifax Town	Released	
19 May 2017	LW	ENG	Sam Kelly	Grimsby Town	Released	
19 May 2017	LB	POR	Kiko	(Portugal) Académico de Viseu	Mutual consent	
19 May 2017	CM	ENG	Ryan Lloyd	Macclesfield Town	Released	
19 May 2017	GK	TUR	Deniz Mehmet	(Scotland) Dundee United	Released	
19 May 2017	CM	FRA	Quentin Pereira	(Andorra) UE Sant Julià	Mutual consent	
19 May 2017	GK	ENG	Harry Pickering	Forest Green Rovers	Released	
19 May 2017	LB	ENG	Scott Tanser	(Scotland) St Johnstone	Released	
19 May 2017	LW	ENG	Jerome Thomas		Released	
22 May 2017	CM	IRL	Sam Foley	Northampton Town	Rejected contract	
23 May 2017	LW	SWE	Chris Mbamba	(Sweden) Oskarshamns AIK	Mutual consent	
23 May 2017	CM	POR	Paulo Tavares	(Portugal) Cova da Piedade	Mutual consent	
28 June 2017	RB	ENG	Ben Purkiss	Swindon Town	Rejected contract	
30 June 2017	CB	CMR	André Bikey	(India) Jamshedpur	Rejected contract	
30 June 2017	RW	ENG	Chris Eagles	(Scotland) Ross County	Rejected contract	
30 June 2017	CM	SWI	Gëzim Shalaj	(Kosovo) Trepça'89	Rejected contract	
30 June 2017	RB	ENG	Ryan Taylor	(India) ATK	Rejected contract	
2017	LW	ENG	Joel Ndala	Manchester City	£300,000	

=== Loans in ===
Date from	Position	Nationality	Name	From	Date until	Ref.
12 August 2016	CF	ENG	Alex Jones	Birmingham City	2 January 2017	
25 August 2016	LB	ENG	Sam Hart	Liverpool	11 January 2017	
11 January 2017	CM	ENG	Callum Guy	Derby County	End of season	
17 January 2017	CF	ENG	Tyler Walker	Nottingham Forest	End of season	
30 January 2017	LW	IRL	Olamide Shodipo	Queens Park Rangers	End of season	
31 January 2017	MF	FRA	Axel Prohouly	Queens Park Rangers	End of season	
31 January 2017	GK	ITA	Leo Fasan	(Scotland) Celtic	End of season	

=== Loans out ===
Date from	Position	Nationality	Name	To	Date until	Ref.
1 July 2016	GK	ENG	Sam Johnson	Gateshead	1 January 2017	
1 July 2016	CM	ENG	Ryan Lloyd	Chester	1 January 2017	
22 August 2016	CF	ENG	JJ Hooper	Northampton Town	10 January 2017	
9 September 2016	GK	ENG	Ryan Boot	Worcester City	October 2016	
9 September 2016	CF	ENG	Dan Turner	Kidsgrove Athletic	8 October 2016	
16 September 2016	CM	WAL	Billy Reeves	Witton Albion	24 October 2016	
17 September 2016	RB	ENG	James Gibbons	Leek Town	17 October 2016	
8 October 2016	CM	GRN	Nathan Ferguson	Southport	3 December 2016	
14 October 2016	GK	ENG	Harry Pickering	Kidsgrove Athletic	November 2016	
11 November 2016	GK	ENG	Ryan Boot	Macclesfield Town	12 January 2017	
18 November 2016	CM	WAL	Billy Reeves	Witton Albion	December 2016	
1 January 2017	GK	ENG	Sam Johnson	FC Halifax Town	End of season	
6 January 2017	LW	ENG	Ryan Lloyd	Chester	End of season	
16 January 2017	CF	ENG	Dan Turner	Worcester City	9 February 2017	
3 February 2017	CM	WAL	Billy Reeves	Stafford Rangers	3 March 2017	
9 March 2017	GK	ENG	Harry Pickering	Newcastle Town	End of season	
