= Rigino Cicilia =

Curaçaoan footballer (born 1994)

Personal information
- Full name: Rigino Cicilia
- Date of birth: 23 September 1994 (age 32)
- Place of birth: Willemstad, Netherlands Antilles
- Height: 1.97 m (6 ft 5 1/2 in)
- Position: Forward

Team information
- Current team: Zbrojovka Brno
- Number: 74

Youth career
- KVC Oranje
- FC Kerkrade-West
- Alemannia Aachen
- Roda JC Kerkrade

Senior career*
Years	Team	Apps	(Gls)
2013–2016	Roda JC Kerkrade	22	(1)
2016	→ RKC Waalwijk (loan)	23	(6)
2016–2017	Port Vale	29	(4)
2017–2018	FK Sūduva	32	(8)
2019–2020	FC Eindhoven	39	(12)
2020–2022	Slovácko	41	(9)
2022–2023	Heracles Almelo	20	(6)
2023–2025	Slovácko	26	(3)
2023–2025	→ Slovácko B (loan)	4	(4)
2025–	Zbrojovka Brno	13	(1)
2025–	→ Zbrojovka Brno B (loan)	1	(0)

International career
2013	Curaçao U20	2	(0)
- * Club domestic league appearances and goals as of 28 May 2026

Rigino Cicilia (born 23 September 1994) is a Curaçaoan footballer who plays as a forward for Czech National Football League club Zbrojovka Brno.

Cicilia won two caps for the Curaçao under-20 team in 2013. A former youth team player at KVC Oranje, FC Kerkrade-West, and Alemannia Aachen, he turned professional at Roda JC Kerkrade and made his first-team debut in August 2014. He spent the 2015–16 season on loan at RKC Waalwijk. He joined the English club Port Vale in June 2016, remaining there for one season before he joined the Lithuanian side FK Sūduva in October 2017. He helped Sūduva to win the A Lyga title in 2017 and 2018 and to win the 2018 Lithuanian Supercup. He returned to the Netherlands to sign with FC Eindhoven in February 2019 and moved to the Czech Republic to join Slovácko in July 2020. He won the Czech Cup with Slovácko in 2022 and then returned to the Netherlands to sign with Heracles Almelo, helping the club to be crowned Eerste Divisie champions at the end of the 2022–23 season. He returned to Slovácko in July 2023. He joined Zbrojovka Brno in September 2025.

== Club career ==
=== Roda JC Kerkrade ===
Cicilia spent his youth with KVC Oranje, FC Kerkrade-West, and Alemannia Aachen (Germany) before joining the youth academy at Roda JC Kerkrade. He was one of a club record eight youth team players offered a professional contract at Roda JC in June 2013. He made his debut in the Eerste Divisie (second tier) on 25 August 2014, coming on for Danny Schreurs 78 minutes into a 3–0 defeat to FC Volendam at the Kras Stadion. He scored his first goal for the club on 23 September, in a 2–1 KNVB Cup victory over SC Heerenveen at the Parkstad Limburg Stadion. Four days later he scored his first league goal, in a 2–1 win over Helmond Sport at the Stadion De Braak. He ended the 2014–15 season with two goals in 23 appearances, though was not used in the play-offs as Roda JC beat NAC Breda to regain a place in the Eredivisie (first tier), and signed a new one-year contract in March 2015.

He made two appearances in the Eredivisie as a substitute in August 2015 before joining Eerste Divisie club RKC Waalwijk on loan for the rest of the 2015–16 season. He made a total of 24 appearances for the club, scoring seven goals, including a hat-trick in a 5–3 home defeat to Jong Ajax on 4 December, as RKC Waalwijk finished second-from-bottom in 18th place. He was released by Roda JC in May 2016. He had a trial at Austrian Bundesliga side SKN St. Pölten in June 2016.

=== Port Vale ===
In June 2016, Cicilia signed a two-year contract with EFL League One club Port Vale. He started just two of the opening ten games of the 2016–17 season and found himself competing with Martin Paterson behind Anton Forrester in the first-team pecking order; Cicilia said that additional conditioning work helped him to adjust to the physicality of the English game. He scored his first goal for the club on 22 October, and then won a penalty, as the "Valiants" came from behind to draw 2–2 with Oxford United at Vale Park. His size and unconventional playing style quickly made him a 'cult hero' for Vale fans, who nicknamed him 'Reggie'. However, Bruno Ribeiro rarely played Cicilia form the start of matches, believing him to be more of an impact substitute. He was sidelined with a calf strain injury in February. He returned to action after a four-week absence, but failed to add to his goal tally, and was sent off for two bookable offence on the final home game of the season – a 2–0 defeat to Bolton Wanderers on 22 April; caretaker manager Michael Brown said that the sending off was harsh. He left Port Vale following the club's relegation in May 2017 after he and Brown came to a mutual agreement to end his contract.

=== FK Sūduva ===
In October 2017, Cicilia signed with Lithuanian A Lyga club FK Sūduva. He played three games for the "Suvalkiečiai" in 2017 as they won the league for the first time in their history. He played and scored in the 2018 Lithuanian Supercup as Sūduva recorded a 5–0 victory over Stumbras. On 11 July, he scored his first career hat-trick as Sūduva beat Cypriot champions APOEL 3–1 at the Sūduva Stadium in the first leg of the first round of qualifying for the UEFA Champions League; he completed his hat-trick within 19 minutes of the kick-off. He was named in A Lyga's Team of the Month for June and July. However, this was reportedly primarily because it was a poor month for attackers in the division. Sūduva went on to retain their league title in 2018.

=== FC Eindhoven ===
On 19 February 2019, Cicilia signed with Eerste Divisie side FC Eindhoven on a contract to run until summer 2020. Head coach David Nascimento stated that "He is a big boy, physically strong, good at the ball and someone who can score a goal". He had to wait 12 games before scoring his first goal of the 2019–20 season, at which point he scored four goals in two games against AZ Alkmaar II and SBV Excelsior. He ended the campaign with 11 goals in 31 games for the "Blauw-witten", before his contract was terminated on 1 April due to the COVID-19 pandemic in the Netherlands.

=== Slovácko ===
On 1 July 2020, Cicilia joined Czech First League club Slovácko on a two-year contract; head coach Martin Svědík signed him to replace departing striker Tomáš Zajíc. He scored three goals in 20 appearances throughout the 2020–21 season, helping Slovácko to qualify for the new UEFA Europa Conference League with a fourth-place league finish. He scored six goals from 23 league appearances in the 2021–22 season, and also scored two goals in four games in the club's Czech Cup campaign Slovácko won the competition for the first time by beating Sparta Prague 3–1 in the final, and Cicilia said that: "the season was hard, a little up and down for me. I'm proud of the boys for how they did it". Cicilia left Slovácko without saying goodbye two weeks before end of his contract.

=== Heracles Almelo ===
On 11 August 2022, Cicilia joined Eerste Divisie club Heracles Almelo on a two-year contract. He scored six goals in twenty league games as Heracles Almelo secured promotion as 2022–23 Eerste Divisie champions. On 2 July 2023, his contract with Heracles was terminated by mutual consent.

=== Return to Slovácko ===
On 11 July 2023, Cicilia rejoined Slovácko on a two-year contract. He scored three goals in 23 games during the 2023–24 campaign. He played five games in the first half of the 2024–25 season.

=== Zbrojovka Brno ===
On 8 September 2025, Cicilia signed a contract with Czech National Football League club Zbrojovka Brno. He featured 14 times in the 2025–26 campaign, scoring one goal.

== International career ==
Cicilia was named in the Curaçao U20 squad for the 2013 CONCACAF U-20 Championship in Mexico, and played both games at the Estadio Cuauhtémoc in Puebla City; a 3–0 defeat to Mexico and a 2–1 defeat to El Salvador.

== Style of play ==
Cicilia is a 1.97 m (6 ft 5 1/2 in) forward, but despite his size is a goal poacher rather than a target man.

== Career statistics ==
As of match played 24 May 2026

Appearances and goals by club, season and competition
Club	Season	League			National cup (Note: Includes KNVB Cup, FA Cup, Lithuanian Football Cup, Czech Cup)		League cup (Note: Includes EFL Cup)		Other		Total	
Club	Season	Division	Apps	Goals	Apps	Goals	Apps	Goals	Apps	Goals	Apps	Goals
Roda JC Kerkrade	2013–14	Eredivisie	0	0	0	0	—		0	0	0	0
Roda JC Kerkrade	2014–15	Eerste Divisie	20	1	3	1	—		0	0	23	2
Roda JC Kerkrade	2015–16	Eredivisie	2	0	0	0	—		0	0	2	0
Roda JC Kerkrade	Total		22	1	3	1	—		0	0	25	2
RKC Waalwijk (loan)	2015–16	Eerste Divisie	23	6	1	1	—		0	0	24	7
Port Vale	2016–17	EFL League One	29	4	3	1	0	0	3 (Note: Appearance(s) in the EFL Trophy)	0	35	5
FK Sūduva	2017	A Lyga	3	0	0	0	—		0	0	3	0
FK Sūduva	2018	A Lyga	29	8	2	0	—		9 (Note: 1 appearance and 1 goal in the Lithuanian Supercup, 4 appearances and 3 goals in the UEFA Champions League, and 4 appearances in the UEFA Europa League)	4	40	12
FK Sūduva	Total		32	8	2	0	—		9	4	43	12
FC Eindhoven	2018–19	Eerste Divisie	11	1	0	0	—		0	0	11	1
FC Eindhoven	2019–20	Eerste Divisie	28	11	3	0	—		0	0	31	11
FC Eindhoven	Total		39	12	3	0	0	0	0	0	42	12
Slovácko	2020–21	Czech First League	18	3	2	0	—		0	0	20	3
Slovácko	2021–22	Czech First League	23	6	4	2	—		2 (Note: Appearances in the UEFA Conference League)	0	29	8
Slovácko	Total		41	9	6	2	0	0	2	0	49	11
Heracles Almelo	2022–23	Eerste Divisie	20	6	0	0	—		0	0	20	6
Slovácko	2023–24	Czech First League	21	3	1	0	—		0	0	22	3
Slovácko	2024–25	Czech First League	5	0	1	0	—		0	0	6	0
Slovácko	Total		26	3	2	0	0	0	0	0	28	3
Slovácko B	2023–24	Moravian-Silesian League	1	1	0	0	—		0	0	1	1
Slovácko B	2024–25	Moravian-Silesian League	3	3	0	0	—		0	0	3	3
Slovácko B	Total		4	4	0	0	0	0	0	0	4	4
Zbrojovka Brno	2025–26	Czech National League	13	1	1	0	—		0	0	14	1
Zbrojovka Brno B	2025–26	Moravian-Silesian League	1	0	0	0	—		0	0	1	0
Career total			250	54	21	5	0	0	14	4	285	63

== Honours ==
Individual

- A Lyga Team of the Month: June/July 2018

FK Sūduva

- A Lyga: 2017
- Lithuanian Supercup: 2018

Slovácko

- Czech Cup: 2022

Heracles Almelo

- Eerste Divisie: 2022–23
