= Sam Hart =

English footballer (born 1996)

Personal information
- Full name: Samuel James Hart
- Date of birth: 10 September 1996 (age 30)
- Place of birth: Bolton, England
- Height: 5 ft 11 in (1.80 m)
- Positions: Left-back; left winger

Team information
- Current team: Dorking Wanderers
- Number: 42

Youth career
- Manchester United
- 2013–2016: Liverpool

Senior career*
Years	Team	Apps	(Gls)
2016–2017	Liverpool	0	(0)
2016–2017	→ Port Vale (loan)	11	(1)
2017–2020	Blackburn Rovers	3	(0)
2018	→ Rochdale (loan)	3	(0)
2018–2019	→ Rochdale (loan)	11	(0)
2019	→ Southend United (loan)	18	(0)
2020	→ Shrewsbury Town (loan)	4	(0)
2020–2021	Southend United	21	(0)
2021–2022	Oldham Athletic	31	(1)
2022–2024	Sutton United	50	(0)
2024–2026	Port Vale	22	(1)
2025–2026	→ Falkirk (loan)	9	(0)
2026–	Dorking Wanderers	0	(0)
- * Club domestic league appearances and goals as of 20 May 2026

Samuel James Hart (born 10 September 1996) is an English professional footballer who plays as a left-back for National League South club Dorking Wanderers.

Hart began his career at Liverpool, where he made his first-team debut in a pre-season friendly in August 2016. He played on loan at Port Vale during the 2016–17 season and was sold to Blackburn Rovers in August 2017. He joined Rochdale on loan in January 2018 and again for the 2018–19 season. He joined Southend United on loan in January 2019 and then loaned out to Shrewsbury Town in January 2020. He joined Southend United permanently in November 2020 and then signed for Oldham Athletic in June 2021. He signed with Sutton United in June 2022 and spent two years with the club before he joined Port Vale. He was promoted out of League Two with the club at the end of the 2024–25 season. He joined Scottish Premiership club Falkirk on loan in September 2025. He dropped into non-League football with Dorking Wanderers in November 2026.

== Career ==
=== Liverpool ===
Hart moved from the Manchester United Academy to the Liverpool Academy whilst an under-16 level player. He made his first appearance for Liverpool on 7 August 2016, coming on as a second-half substitute in a 4–0 friendly defeat to Mainz 05 at the Opel Arena.

In August 2016, Hart joined League One side Port Vale on loan for the 2016–17 season, as manager Bruno Ribeiro needed cover for injured duo Kiko and Adam Yates. He made his debut in professional football on 27 August, coming on as an 83rd-minute substitute for Jerome Thomas in a 3–1 win over Scunthorpe United at Vale Park. With Thomas injured, Hart made his first league start on 27 September, playing at left-wing in a 3–1 home win over Millwall. His performance impressed Ribeiro, who stated that Hart played well enough to guarantee himself either the left-back or left-wing spot in the next game. He scored his first goal in senior football on 29 October, in a 3–1 defeat to hometown club Bolton Wanderers at the Macron Stadium. Hart's loan deal was cut short after Michael Brown succeeded Ribeiro as manager in January 2017; he had made 12 starts and four substitute appearances for the "Valiants", often out of position on the left and right-wing. He was reportedly targeted by Grimsby Town for a loan deal in July 2017.

=== Blackburn Rovers ===
On 31 August 2017, Hart signed a two-year deal with League One side Blackburn Rovers after he was purchased for an undisclosed fee. On 18 January 2018, he joined fellow League One side Rochdale on loan until the end of the 2017–18 season, having featured just seven times for Tony Mowbray's Rovers. Manager Keith Hill needed cover at left-back having sold Joe Bunney to Northampton Town. Hart featured just three times for the "Dale" during his time at Spotland, though came on as a substitute in the final day win over Charlton Athletic that secured the club's League One status.

On 30 August 2018, Hart returned to Rochdale on loan for the remainder of the 2018–19 season. He said: "I'm really happy. I have got a bond with the football club and the people here, so I am excited to be back". He made 13 appearances, but did not feature after playing in a 4–2 defeat at Oxford United on 27 November, and was recalled to Blackburn on 2 January. On 15 January 2019, he returned to League One, joining Southend United on loan until the end of the 2018–19 season. He made his "Shrimpers" debut four days later, playing at left-wing-back in a 4–0 win at Bradford City; after the game manager Chris Powell said that he was pleased with Hart's performance. Hart went on to sign a one-year contract extension at Blackburn the following week, keeping him tied to the club until 2020.

He missed the first half of the 2019–20 season after picking up a hamstring injury in pre-season. On 17 January 2020, Hart joined League One side Shrewsbury Town on loan until the end of the 2019–20 season. "Shrews" manager Sam Ricketts signed him to replace recalled Wolverhampton Wanderers loanee Ryan Giles. He was released by Blackburn manager Tony Mowbray on 24 July 2020.

=== Southend United ===
On 11 November 2020, Hart rejoined Southend United, who were now bottom of League Two, on a permanent deal until the end of the 2020–21 season. He was sent off for a strong challenge on Derick Osei during a 0–0 draw with Walsall at Roots Hall on 23 March and handed a three-match ban. However, manager Mark Molesley confirmed Southend would appeal the ban. New boss Phil Brown took charge the following month and said Hart was an "outstanding" player who would "definitely be in the standing line up". The club were relegated out of the English Football League after finishing second-bottom of League Two.

=== Oldham Athletic ===
On 22 June 2021, Hart signed a one-year deal – with an option to extend – with League Two side Oldham Athletic. Manager Keith Curle stated that as a "typical type of wing-back... he'll have an impact on a regular basis in games" and would "become an important part of the team". He scored his second career goal on 20 November, to secure a 3–2 win over former club Port Vale at Boundary Park. Curle was sacked in November and the "Latics" form improved after John Sheridan replaced interim manager Selim Benachour in January. However, Oldham were relegated at the end of the 2021–22 season, and Hart took to social media to say it would "hurt for a long time". The Oldham Times described him as "one of the club's better and most consistent performers". Oldham offered him a new contract, which he turned down.

=== Sutton United ===
Hart remained in League Two after he agreed a two-year deal with Sutton United on 28 June 2022, with manager Matt Gray looking to provide competition for left-back Robert Milsom. He featured 24 times in the 2022–23 campaign and said "it's good being in a winning environment again" in April, though Sutton missed out on the play-offs. He featured 32 times in the 2023–24 season and was named as the Supporters' Club Player of the Season. Sutton were relegated back into non-League football at the end of the season and Hart rejected the club's offer of a new contract.

=== Port Vale ===
On 26 June 2024, Hart agreed to join his former loan club, Port Vale, on a two-year deal. Manager Darren Moore said that the signing would bring balance to the club's back line. Hart sustained a hamstring injury early in the season and was ruled out of action for what Moore said would be "some considerable time". He played 22 league games in the 2024–25 campaign, helping the team to secure an automatic promotion place.

On 3 September 2025, Hart joined newly-promoted Scottish Premiership club Falkirk on loan for the 2025–26 season. Manager John McGlynn stated that "he likes to get up and down the flank and we know he'll add real quality and depth to the squad". He suffered a concussion against Hearts, which sidelined with him for eight weeks, and then he found himself on the bench upon his return to fitness. He was released by Port Vale upon the expiry of his contract. He was part of the 39-man Professional Footballers' Association (PFA) free agent squad in July 2026.

=== Dorking Wanderers ===
On 19 November 2026, Hart joined National League South club Dorking Wanderers on a deal until the end of the 2026–27 season.

== Style of play ==
Hart was described by the Liverpool website as "a left-back, who relishes going forward and poses a real threat when pushing on down the flank" and someone who "can carry the attack with his fine athletic profile – but he's also very strong in the tackle".

== Career statistics ==
As of match played 16 May 2026

Appearances and goals by club, season and competition
Club	Season	League			National cup (Note: Includes FA Cup, Scottish Cup)		League cup (Note: Includes Football League Cup, Scottish League Cup)		Other		Total	
Club	Season	Division	Apps	Goals	Apps	Goals	Apps	Goals	Apps	Goals	Apps	Goals
Liverpool	2016–17	Premier League	0	0	0	0	0	0	—		0	0
Port Vale (loan)	2016–17	League One	11	1	2	0	—		3 (Note: Appearances in the EFL Trophy)	0	16	1
Blackburn Rovers	2017–18	League One	3	0	2	0	—		2	0	7	0
Blackburn Rovers	2018–19	Championship	0	0	0	0	0	0	—		0	0
Blackburn Rovers	2019–20	Championship	0	0	0	0	0	0	—		0	0
Blackburn Rovers	Total		3	0	2	0	0	0	2	0	7	0
Rochdale (loan)	2017–18	League One	3	0	0	0	—		—		3	0
Rochdale (loan)	2018–19	League One	11	0	1	0	—		1	0	13	0
Rochdale (loan)	Total		14	0	1	0	0	0	1	0	16	0
Southend United (loan)	2018–19	League One	18	0	—		—		—		18	0
Shrewsbury Town (loan)	2019–20	League One	4	0	0	0	—		—		4	0
Southend United	2020–21	League Two	21	0	—		—		—		21	0
Oldham Athletic	2021–22	League Two	31	1	1	0	2	0	1	0	35	1
Sutton United	2022–23	League Two	20	0	1	0	0	0	3	0	24	0
Sutton United	2023–24	League Two	30	0	0	0	1	0	1	0	32	0
Sutton United	Total		50	0	1	0	1	0	4	0	56	0
Port Vale	2024–25	League Two	22	1	0	0	0	0	4	0	26	1
Port Vale	2025–26	League One	0	0	0	0	0	0	0	0	0	0
Port Vale	Total		22	1	0	0	0	0	4	0	26	1
Falkirk (loan)	2025–26	Scottish Premiership	9	0	0	0	—		—		9	0
Dorking Wanderers	2026–27	National League South	0	0	—		—		0	0	0	0
Career total			183	3	7	0	3	0	15	0	208	3

== Honours ==
Port Vale

- EFL League Two second-place promotion: 2024–25

Individual

- Sutton United Supporters' Club Player of the Season: 2023–24
