= Chris Mbamba =

Zimbabwean-born Swedish footballer (born 1992)

Personal information
- Full name: Christopher Tangeni Mbamba
- Date of birth: 30 April 1992 (age 34)
- Place of birth: Harare, Zimbabwe
- Height: 1.82 m (5 ft 11 1/2 in)
- Position: Winger

Youth career
- Hellas FC
- 2009–2011: IFK Göteborg

Senior career*
Years	Team	Apps	(Gls)
2012–2013	Qviding FIF	35	(3)
2014	Medkila IL	14	(2)
2014	Alta IF	10	(1)
2015–2016	HamKam	20	(3)
2016–2017	Port Vale	6	(0)
2018	Oskarshamns AIK	26	(2)
2019	IK Oddevold	6	(1)
2020	Assyriska BK		
Total		117	(12)

International career
- Sweden U17
- * Club domestic league appearances and goals

Christopher Tangeni Mbamba (born 30 April 1992) is a Swedish former professional footballer who played as a winger.

Born in Zimbabwe, he represented Sweden at under-17 level. He came through the youth team at IFK Göteborg and was an unused substitute in the 2010 Svenska Supercupen final. He moved on to Qviding FIF the following year, where he spent two seasons. He moved to Norway in 2014 and spent the next three years with Medkila IL, Alta IF and Hamarkameratene. In July 2016, he was signed by English club Port Vale, though he left after the Vale were relegated out of EFL League One. He signed with Oskarshamns AIK in April 2018 before moving on to IK Oddevold in January 2019. He dropped a division to join Assyriska BK in January 2020.

== Club career ==
=== Sweden ===
Mbamba was born in Zimbabwe, and spent time with Hellas FC before he moved to Sweden to join the youth team at IFK Göteborg. He was vice-captain of the highly rated IFK Göteborg Under-19 team that won the Junior Allsvenskan Elite Southern Division in 2011 and reached the semi-finals of the Swedish Under-19 National Championships play-offs, losing to Kalmar FF 6–4 on penalties. He was also regularly part of the first-team squad and was an unused substitute in the 2010 Svenska Supercupen defeat to AIK at Råsunda Stadium, though did not make an appearance in a competitive match. After the 2011 Allsvenskan season he was released, and subsequently spent two seasons with Qviding FIF of Division 1.

=== Norway ===
In 2014, he joined the Norwegian side Medkila IL in the 2. divisjon, and scored two goals in 14 league games. He signed with Norwegian First Division side Alta IF in August 2014. However, following their relegation, he went to Hamarkameratene ahead of the 2015 season. He damaged his cruciate ligaments in July 2015, and only returned to full fitness midway through the 2016 campaign. He recovered well, and in a reserve team match managed to provide an assist for all six goals in a 6–0 win over Kattem on 15 May. Hamkam manager Stein Arne Ingelstad said that Mbamba was a popular player who was "a little frustrating when he has not used his exceptional speed to pass defenders when he had the opportunity".

=== Port Vale ===
He signed with EFL League One club Port Vale in July 2016. He made his professional debut on 6 August, after coming on for Anthony de Freitas as a 57th-minute substitute in a 0–0 draw with Bradford City. He made 11 appearances across the 2016–17 season, and left the club in May 2017 after new manager Michael Brown agreed a settlement on the final 12 months of his contract.

=== Return to Sweden ===
Mbamba returned to Sweden and on 5 April 2018 signed with Division 1 club Oskarshamns AIK. Oskarshamns finished second in the Södra table in the 2018 season and qualified to the promotion play-offs, but failed to reach the Superettan after losing out to Varbergs BoIS on away goals; Mbamba was a late substitute in both legs. He switched to divisional rivals Oskarshamns AIK in the off-season.

On 28 January 2020, Mbamba signed with Division 2 side Assyriska BK. The club announced in June 2020 that Mbamba had left the club.

== International career ==
Mbamba was born in Zimbabwe to Namibian father and Kenyan mother. He moved to Sweden at a young age and represented the Sweden under-17s. In February 2019, Mbamba declared his intention to represent Kenya. He was granted a Kenyan passport the following month. In May 2019, Mbamba was named as part of the provisional squad for Kenya in the 2019 Africa Cup of Nations. Mbamba was called up for a qualification match with Ghana, but did not play because he had not completed his paperwork. He was dropped from the final team list due to an ankle injury.

== Style of play ==
Mbamba is a pacey winger and also as a box-to-box centre midfielder. He was described in Pulse Kenya as being "known for his speed and versatility as a winger or attacking midfielder".

== Career statistics ==
Appearances and goals by club, season and competition
Club	Season	League			National cup (Note: Includes the Norwegian Football Cup and Svenska Cupen.)		League cup (Note: Includes the EFL Cup.)		Other		Total	
Club	Season	Division	Apps	Goals	Apps	Goals	Apps	Goals	Apps	Goals	Apps	Goals
Qviding FIF	2012	Division 1 Södra	18	1	0	0	—		0	0	18	1
Qviding FIF	2013	Division 1 Södra	17	2	1	0	—		0	0	18	2
Qviding FIF	Total		35	3	1	0	0	0	0	0	36	3
Medkila IL	2014	2. divisjon Group 4	14	2	1	0	—		0	0	15	2
Alta IF	2014	Norwegian First Division	10	1	0	0	—		0	0	10	1
Hamarkameratene	2015	2. divisjon Group 4	13	1	2	0	—		0	0	15	1
Hamarkameratene	2016	2. divisjon Group 2	7	2	0	0	—		0	0	7	2
Hamarkameratene	Total		20	3	2	0	0	0	0	0	22	3
Port Vale	2016–17	EFL League One	6	0	1	0	1	0	3 (Note: Appearance(s) in the EFL Trophy.)	0	11	0
Oskarshamns AIK	2018	Division 1 Södra	26	2	1	0	—		2	0	29	2
IK Oddevold	2019	Division 1 Södra	6	1	1	0	—		2 (Note: Appearance(s) in the play-offs)	0	9	1
Career total			117	12	7	0	1	0	7	0	132	12

== Honours ==
IFK Göteborg

- Svenska Supercupen runner-up: 2010
