= Anthony de Freitas =

French footballer (born 1994)

Personal information
- Full name: Anthony Marie Gerard de Freitas
- Date of birth: 10 May 1994 (age 32)
- Place of birth: Lyon, France
- Height: 5 ft 10 in (1.78 m)
- Positions: Midfielder; left-back

Team information
- Current team: Biel-Bienne
- Number: 28

Youth career
- 2000–2001: Saint-Cyr-au-Mont-d'Or
- 2001–2002: De Dardilly
- 2002: Saint-Cyr-au-Mont-d'Or
- 2002–2010: De Lyon Et Du Rhône
- 2010–2013: Clermont Auvergne

Senior career*
Years	Team	Apps	(Gls)
2013–2015	Monaco II	38	(1)
2015	→ Monts d'Or Azergues (loan)	1	(1)
2016	→ Varzim (loan)	19	(1)
2016–2018	Port Vale	35	(0)
2018–2019	La Chaux-de-Fonds	21	(4)
2019–	Biel-Bienne	146	(9)

International career
2013	France U20	2	(0)
- * Club domestic league appearances and goals as of 30 September 2026

Anthony Marie Gerard de Freitas (born 10 May 1994) is a French footballer who plays as a midfielder for Swiss Promotion League side Biel-Bienne.

A former Monaco youth team player, he spent time on loan at Monts d'Or Azergues in the Championnat de France Amateur and with Portuguese side Varzim in the LigaPro. He also won two caps for the France under-20 team. He was signed by English club Port Vale in July 2016 and stayed with the club for one and a half seasons. He joined Swiss club La Chaux-de-Fonds in June 2018 and then moved to Biel-Bienne the following year. He captained the club in the 2025 Swiss Cup final.

== Playing career ==
=== Monaco II ===
As a youth team player with Monaco, he played for the reserve team in the Championnat de France Amateur, featuring five times in 2012–13 as Monaco II finished 12th, 17 times in the 2013–14 season as they finished in eighth place, and scoring one goal in 16 games in the 2014–15 campaign to help the club to a ninth-place finish. He also played one game on loan at Monts d'Or Azergues on 19 December 2015, scoring 19 minutes after entering the game as a substitute in a 2–2 draw with GF38. He was then loaned out to Portuguese side Varzim in the LigaPro. He made his professional debut on 31 January 2016, in a 1–1 draw with Penafiel at the Estádio do Varzim SC. He played a total of 19 games for the club, and scored his first goal in professional football on 8 May, in a 2–0 win over Oriental. Capucho led Varzim to a ninth-place finish in the league.

=== Port Vale ===
De Freitas signed a two-year contract with EFL League One club Port Vale in July 2016. Manager Bruno Ribeiro compared de Freitas to himself as a player, and said his versatility made him a key player for the "Valiants". He remained a part of the first-team after Michael Brown succeeded Ribeiro as manager in December, before being sidelined for six weeks with a groin injury picked up in February. With the "Valiants" now in EFL League Two, he made 13 appearances in the first half of the 2017–18 season, before his contract was ended by mutual consent after meeting with new manager Neil Aspin in January 2018.

=== La Chaux-de-Fonds ===
In June 2018, De Freitas joined Swiss Promotion League side La Chaux-de-Fonds. He left the club at the end of the season.

=== Biel-Bienne ===
In September 2019, it was confirmed that De Freitas had joined Swiss 1. Liga side FC Biel-Bienne on a contract for the rest of 2019. On 21 November, he extended his contract with the club until the summer 2020. He captained the club to the Swiss Cup final in the 2024–25 campaign, the first time in the competition's 100-year history that a third-tier club had reached a final. He scored an own goal in the final, which ended in a 4–1 defeat to Basel.

== International career ==
He was called up to play for the France under-20 team at the Jeux de la Francophonie; France did not qualify for the knockout stages after losing 3–0 to Congo in the group stage.

== Style of play ==
Speaking in July 2016, de Freitas described himself as a "fighter". He can play across the midfield, and is also able to play at left-back.

== Career statistics ==
Appearances and goals by club, season and competition
Club	Season	League			National cup (Note: Includes Coupe de France, Taça de Portugal, FA Cup)		League cup (Note: Includes Coupe de la Ligue, Taça da Liga, EFL Cup)		Other		Total	
Club	Season	Division	Apps	Goals	Apps	Goals	Apps	Goals	Apps	Goals	Apps	Goals
Monaco II	2012–13	CFA Group C	5	0	0	0	0	0	0	0	5	0
Monaco II	2013–14	CFA Group C	17	0	0	0	0	0	0	0	17	0
Monaco II	2014–15	CFA Group C	16	1	0	0	0	0	0	0	16	1
Monaco II	Total		38	1	0	0	0	0	0	0	38	1
Monts d'Or Azergues (loan)	2015–16	CFA Group B	1	1	0	0	0	0	0	0	1	1
Varzim (loan)	2015–16	LigaPro	19	1	0	0	0	0	0	0	19	1
Port Vale	2016–17	EFL League One	24	0	3	0	1	0	1 (Note: Appearance(s) in the EFL Trophy.)	0	29	0
Port Vale	2017–18	EFL League Two	11	0	0	0	0	0	2	0	13	0
Port Vale	Total		35	0	3	0	1	0	3	0	42	0
Career total (Note: Statistics for La Chaux-de-Fonds and Biel-Bienne not known.)			93	3	3	0	1	0	3	0	100	3

== Honours ==
Biel-Bienne

- Swiss Cup runner-up: 2024–25
