= Paulo Tavares =

Portuguese professional footballer (born 1985)

Personal information
- Full name: Paulo Daniel Fernandes Tavares
- Date of birth: 9 December 1985 (age 40)
- Place of birth: Massarelos, Portugal
- Height: 1.79 m (5 ft 10 1/2 in)
- Position: Midfielder

Youth career
- 1995–2001: Senhora da Hora
- 2001–2004: Leixões

Senior career*
Years	Team	Apps	(Gls)
2004–2012	Leixões	46	(6)
2004–2006	→ Padroense (loan)		
2006–2008	→ Ribeirão (loan)	35	(1)
2008	→ Estoril (loan)	13	(2)
2012–2016	Vitória Setúbal	87	(6)
2016–2017	Port Vale	22	(0)
2017–2018	Cova da Piedade	16	(0)
2018	Hồ Chí Minh City	14	(0)
2019–2022	Lusitânia	62	(2)
2022–202?	Coimbrões		
Total		295	(17)
- * Club domestic league appearances and goals

Paulo Daniel Fernandes Tavares (born 9 December 1985) is a Portuguese former professional footballer who played as a midfielder.

He made his first-team debut with Leixões in May 2004 and then spent the next four years on loan with lower league clubs Padroense, Ribeirão, and Estoril. He played in the Primeira Liga with Leixões in 2008–09, though the club were relegated the following season. He returned to the Primeira Liga when he signed with Vitória Setúbal in July 2012 and remained with the club for four years. He joined English club Port Vale in July 2016. He returned to Portugal and joined Cova da Piedade in August 2017. In February 2018, he travelled to Vietnam to sign for Hồ Chí Minh City. He returned to Portugal to play for Lusitânia in June 2019 and then moved on to Coimbrões in 2022.

== Career ==
=== Leixões ===
Paulo Daniel Fernandes Tavares was born in Massarelos, and began his career in Senhora da Hora. He came through the junior ranks at Leixões to make his first-team debut in the Segunda Liga (second tier) on 9 May 2004, coming on as a 77th-minute substitute for Bruno China in a 1–1 draw with Varzim at the Estádio do Mar. He went on to spend two years at Terceira Divisão (fourth tier) club Padroense, helping them to finish 13th in Série B in 2004–05 and 15th in 2005–06; with the latter campaign seeing the club relegated into the regional leagues (fifth tier). Tavares then joined Ribeirão on loan, making 20 appearances in the 2006–07 campaign as the club finished fourth in Segunda Divisão – Série A (third tier). He then featured in 17 league games in the 2007–08 season before moving back up to the Liga de Honra (second tier) with Estoril. He scored two goals in 13 league games for Estoril, who ended the 2007–08 season in seventh place.

He returned to the first team at Leixões in 2008, with the club now in the Primeira Liga (first tier). Initially a squad player under José Mota, he featured in just four league games in both the 2008–09 and 2009–10 campaigns. The club were relegated in 2009–10, and Tavares played 12 games in the 2010–11 campaign, before he secured a first-team place in the 2011–12, scoring seven goals in 34 appearances.

=== Vitória Setúbal ===
Tavares then returned to the Primeira Liga to sign with Vitória Setúbal in July 2012, now coached by José Mota. He scored twice in 32 games in the 2012–13 season, helping the club to finish two points above the relegation zone. He then scored five goals (including four penalties) in 18 games in 2013–14 as Vitória posted a seventh-place finish, though he missed four months of the season with a fractured toe. He signed a new two-year contract in April 2014. He scored twice in 32 matches in the 2014–15 campaign as Vitória finished in 14th place, and he featured 22 times in the 2015–16 season as the club finished just one point above the relegation zone. He was offered a new two-year contract by new manager José Couceiro in May 2016. However, he decided to reject the offer and look for a new club.

=== Port Vale ===
Tavares signed a two-year contract with EFL League One club Port Vale in July 2016, in a move that reunited him with former Vitória manager Bruno Ribeiro. He started the first five league games of the 2016–17 season, before picking up a hamstring injury at the end of August. He quickly returned to the first-team, and along with Kjell Knops was only one of two of the club's 11 overseas signings to secure a regular place in the starting eleven. However, Ribeiro resigned on Boxing day, and Tavares found his first-team chances very limited under caretaker manager Michael Brown so instead used his time to help coach the under-9 and under-10 teams. Tavares left Vale Park after agreeing to a settlement on the remainder of his contract in May 2017.

=== Later career ===
On 12 August 2017, Tavares returned to Portugal and signed with newly-promoted LigaPro club Cova da Piedade. He played 16 games for the "Rapazes de Azul-Grená" over the 2017–18 season, and was sent off on his final appearance for the club on 11 February, in a 1–0 defeat to Vitória S.C. B at the Estádio D. Afonso Henriques.

In February 2018, Tavares signed with Vietnamese V.League 1 club Hồ Chí Minh City. He returned to Portugal and in June 2019 signed with Campeonato de Portugal side Lusitânia. He had an eventful home debut on 12 October, getting sent off for a second yellow card moments after scoring the winning goal in a 2–1 victory over Leça. Lusitânia were second in Serie B when the 2019–20 season was curtailed early due to the COVID-19 pandemic in Portugal. He played 23 games in the 2020–21 season, helping Lusitânia to win promotion into Liga 3. He played 24 games in the 2021–22 season as Lusitânia were relegated back to the fourth tier. He then moved on to Coimbrões.

== Career statistics ==
Appearances and goals by club, season and competition
Club	Season	League			National Cup (Note: Includes Taça de Portugal, FA Cup)		Other (Note: Includes Taça da Liga, EFL Cup, EFL Trophy)		Total	
Club	Season	Division	Apps	Goals	Apps	Goals	Apps	Goals	Apps	Goals
Leixões	2003–04	Segunda Liga	1	0	0	0	0	0	1	0
Leixões	2008–09	Primeira Liga	4	0	1	1	1	0	6	1
Leixões	2009–10	Primeira Liga	4	0	0	0	2	0	6	0
Leixões	2010–11	Liga de Honra	10	0	1	0	1	0	12	0
Leixões	2011–12	Liga de Honra	27	6	4	1	3	0	34	7
Leixões	Total		46	6	6	2	7	0	59	8
Ribeirão (loan)	2006–07	Segunda Divisão – Série A	18	1	2	0	0	0	20	1
Ribeirão (loan)	2007–08	Segunda Divisão – Série A	17	0	1	0	0	0	18	0
Ribeirão (loan)	Total		35	1	3	0	0	0	38	1
Estoril (loan)	2007–08	Liga de Honra	13	2	0	0	0	0	13	2
Vitória Setúbal	2012–13	Primeira Liga	26	2	1	0	5	0	32	2
Vitória Setúbal	2013–14	Primeira Liga	14	3	2	0	2	2	18	5
Vitória Setúbal	2014–15	Primeira Liga	26	1	2	0	4	1	32	2
Vitória Setúbal	2015–16	Primeira Liga	21	0	0	0	1	0	22	0
Vitória Setúbal	Total		87	6	5	0	12	3	104	9
Port Vale	2016–17	EFL League One	22	0	2	0	2	0	26	0
Cova da Piedade	2017–18	LigaPro	16	0	2	0	1	0	19	0
Hồ Chí Minh City	2018	V.League 1	14	0	0	0	0	0	14	0
Lusitânia	2019–20	Campeonato de Portugal	15	1	0	0	0	0	15	1
Lusitânia	2020–21	Campeonato de Portugal	23	0	0	0	0	0	23	0
Lusitânia	2021–22	Liga 3	24	1	0	0	0	0	24	1
Lusitânia	2022–23	Campeonato de Portugal	0	0	0	0	0	0	0	0
Lusitânia	Total		62	2	0	0	0	0	62	2
Career total (Note: Statistics for Padroense not known.)			295	17	18	2	22	3	335	22
