= Kiko (footballer, born 1993) =

Portuguese footballer

Personal information
- Full name: Francisco Manuel Geraldo Rosa
- Date of birth: 20 January 1993 (age 33)
- Place of birth: Alcácer do Sal, Portugal
- Height: 1.83 m (6 ft 0 in)
- Position: Left-back

Team information
- Current team: Anorthosis Famagusta
- Number: 5

Youth career
- 2001–2003: Alcacerense
- 2003–2012: Vitória Setúbal

Senior career*
| Years | Team | Apps | (Gls) |
| 2012–2016 | Vitória Setúbal | 21 | (0) |
| 2015–2016 | → Académico Viseu (loan) | 22 | (3) |
| 2016–2017 | Port Vale | 21 | (0) |
| 2017–2018 | Académico Viseu | 23 | (0) |
| 2018–2019 | Arouca | 28 | (0) |
| 2019–2020 | Olympiakos Nicosia | 21 | (2) |
| 2020–2022 | Omonia | 23 | (1) |
| 2022– | Anorthosis Famagusta | 91 | (6) |

International career
| 2012 | Portugal U19 | 3 | (0) |
| 2012–2013 | Portugal U20 | 15 | (1) |
- * Club domestic league appearances and goals as of 12:32, 13 September 2026 (UTC)

Francisco Manuel Geraldo Rosa (born 20 January 1993), known as Kiko, is a Portuguese footballer who plays as a left-back for First Division club Anorthosis Famagusta.

A Portugal under-20 international, he made his debut in the Primeira Liga with Vitória Setúbal in January 2012. He was loaned out to Académico Viseu for the 2015–16 season. He signed with English club Port Vale in July 2016. He returned to Portugal after one season in England and joined Académico de Viseu. He signed with Arouca in May 2018 before moving to the Cypriot First Division with Olympiakos Nicosia in July 2019. He moved on to Omonia 12 months later and helped the club to win the league title in the 2020–21 season and the Cypriot Cup the following season. He switched to Anorthosis Famagusta in July 2022.

== Club career ==
=== Vitória Setúbal ===
Kiko began his career with Vitória Setúbal and was given his Primeira Liga debut by head coach Bruno Ribeiro on 6 January 2012, in a 1–1 draw with Académica at the Estádio do Bonfim. He returned to play for the youth team after Ribeiro was replaced as head coach by José Mota the following month, and made sporadic appearances over the 2011–12, 2012–13 and 2013–14 campaigns. He featured 13 times in the 2014–15 season under first Domingos Paciência and then returning head coach Bruno Ribeiro. However, he was judged surplus to requirements by the new head coach Quim Machado. He spent the 2015–16 season on loan at LigaPro club Académico Viseu. He briefly played under Bruno Ribeiro at Académico Viseu, though was initially signed by Ricardo Chéu. He scored three goals in 24 appearances for Académico Viseu, finishing in 17th place.

=== Port Vale ===
Kiko signed a two-year contract with EFL League One club Port Vale in July 2016 after being recruited by former Vitória Setúbal coach Bruno Ribeiro. He began the 2016–17 season out injured after damaging his Achilles in pre-season; his injury left Vale without a specialist full-back as Adam Yates also picked up an injury in pre-season. He made his first-team debut for the "Valiants" on 30 August, in a 1–0 win over Derby County U23 in the EFL Trophy. However, Ribeiro resigned in December, and caretaker manager Michael Brown signed Scott Tanser to play at left-back, leaving Kiko out of the first-team for the first six weeks of 2017. He left Port Vale following the club's relegation in May 2017 after he and Brown came to a mutual agreement to end his contract.

=== Return to Portugal ===
Kiko returned to Portugal and signed with LigaPro club Académico Viseu in July 2017. He made 23 appearances during the 2017–18 campaign as Académico posted a fifth-place finish.

On 30 May 2018, Kiko signed with LigaPro rivals Arouca. However, Cypriot club Doxa Katokopias claimed that he had also signed a contract with them, and said they would pursue legal action with FIFA. He remained with Arouca, and made 31 appearances during the 2018–19 season, picking up ten yellow cards, as Arouquenses were relegated to the Campeonato de Portugal.

=== Cyprus ===
Kiko joined Cypriot First Division club Olympiakos Nicosia in July 2019. He scored two goals in 23 games during the 2019–20 season, which was abandoned due to the COVID-19 pandemic in Cyprus.

He joined league rivals Omonia in July 2020. Henning Berg led Omonia to the Cypriot championship at the end of the 2020–21 season. However, Kiko played just seven league games. Kiko featured 18 times in the 2021–22 campaign and was given a start by manager Neil Lennon in the final of the Cypriot Cup as Omonoia defeated Ethnikos Achna on penalties following a 0–0 draw. He left the club in May 2022.

Kiko remained in the Cypriot First Division as on 6 July 2022, he signed a two-year contract with Anorthosis Famagusta. He played 17 games in the 2022–23 campaign, scoring one goal. He again featured 17 times in the 2023–24 season. He featured 28 times in the 2024–25 campaign. He played 28 games in the 2025–26 sason, scoring three goals.

== International career ==
Rosa won caps for the Portugal under-19 and under-20 teams and was named in the squads for both the 2013 Toulon Tournament and the 2013 FIFA U-20 World Cup. He played three games in the Toulon Tournament, as Portugal finished in fourth place following a 2–1 defeat to France in the third place play-off at the Stade du Ray in Nice, France. He featured once in the U-20 World Cup, coming on as a half-time substitute in a 5–0 win over Cuba at the Kadir Has Stadium in Kayseri, Turkey.

== Career statistics ==
As of match played 15 May 2026

| Club | Season | League | | | National Cup (Note: Includes Taça de Portugal, FA Cup, Cypriot Cup.) | | League Cup (Note: Includes Taça da Liga, EFL Cup.) | | Other | | Total | |
| Club | Season | Division | Apps | Goals | Apps | Goals | Apps | Goals | Apps | Goals | Apps | Goals |
|---|---|---|---|---|---|---|---|---|---|---|---|---|
Vitória Setúbal
| Vitória Setúbal | 2011–12 | Primeira Liga | 3 | 0 | 0 | 0 | 2 | 0 | 0 | 0 | 5 | 0 |
| Vitória Setúbal | 2012–13 | Primeira Liga | 6 | 0 | 0 | 0 | 0 | 0 | 0 | 0 | 6 | 0 |
| Vitória Setúbal | 2013–14 | Primeira Liga | 1 | 0 | 2 | 0 | 2 | 0 | 0 | 0 | 5 | 0 |
| Vitória Setúbal | 2014–15 | Primeira Liga | 11 | 0 | 0 | 0 | 2 | 0 | 0 | 0 | 13 | 0 |
| Vitória Setúbal | 2015–16 | Primeira Liga | 0 | 0 | 0 | 0 | 0 | 0 | 0 | 0 | 0 | 0 |
| Vitória Setúbal | Total | | 21 | 0 | 2 | 0 | 6 | 0 | 0 | 0 | 29 | 0 |
| Académico Viseu (loan) | 2015–16 | LigaPro | 22 | 3 | 1 | 0 | 1 | 0 | 0 | 0 | 24 | 3 |
| Port Vale | 2016–17 | EFL League One | 21 | 0 | 2 | 0 | 0 | 0 | 3 (Note: Appearance/s in the EFL Trophy.) | 0 | 26 | 0 |
| Académico Viseu | 2017–18 | LigaPro | 23 | 0 | 0 | 0 | 0 | 0 | 0 | 0 | 23 | 0 |
| Arouca | 2018–19 | LigaPro | 28 | 0 | 3 | 1 | 1 | 0 | 0 | 0 | 32 | 1 |
| Olympiakos Nicosia | 2019–20 | Cypriot First Division | 21 | 2 | 2 | 0 | — | | 0 | 0 | 23 | 2 |
| Omonia | 2020–21 | Cypriot First Division | 7 | 1 | 1 | 0 | — | | 4 (Note: 1 appearance in the UEFA Champions League and 3 appearances in the UEFA Europa League.) | 0 | 12 | 1 |
| Omonia | 2021–22 | Cypriot First Division | 16 | 0 | 2 | 0 | — | | 6 (Note: 2 appearances in the UEFA Europa League and 4 appearances in the UEFA Conference League.) | 0 | 24 | 0 |
| Omonia | Total | | 23 | 1 | 3 | 0 | 0 | 0 | 10 | 1 | 36 | 2 |
| Anorthosis Famagusta | 2022–23 | Cypriot First Division | 17 | 1 | 0 | 0 | — | | 0 | 0 | 17 | 1 |
| Anorthosis Famagusta | 2023–24 | Cypriot First Division | 16 | 0 | 1 | 0 | — | | 0 | 0 | 17 | 0 |
| Anorthosis Famagusta | 2024–25 | Cypriot First Division | 27 | 0 | 1 | 0 | — | | 0 | 0 | 28 | 0 |
| Anorthosis Famagusta | 2025–26 | Cypriot First Division | 28 | 3 | 0 | 0 | — | | 0 | 0 | 28 | 3 |
| Anorthosis Famagusta | 2026–27 | Cypriot First Division | 0 | 0 | 0 | 0 | — | | 0 | 0 | 0 | 0 |
| Anorthosis Famagusta | Total | | 88 | 4 | 2 | 0 | 0 | 0 | 0 | 0 | 90 | 4 |
| Career total | | | 247 | 10 | 15 | 1 | 8 | 0 | 13 | 0 | 283 | 11 |

== Honours ==
Omonia

- Cypriot First Division: 2020–21
- Cypriot Cup: 2021–22
