= 2014–15 Taça da Liga =

Tournament details
- Host country: Portugal
- Dates: 26 July 2014 – 29 May 2015
- Teams: 36

Final positions
- Champions: Benfica (6th title)
- Runners-up: Marítimo

Tournament statistics
- Matches played: 83
- Goals scored: 200 (2.41 per match)
- Top scorer: Jonas (5 goals)

The 2014–15 Taça da Liga was the eighth edition of the Taça da Liga, a Portuguese football cup competition organized by the Liga Portuguesa de Futebol Profissional (LPFP). 36 clubs competing in the top two professional tiers of Portuguese football competed in it– 18 teams from the 2014–15 Primeira Liga plus 18 non-reserve teams from the 2014–15 Segunda Liga.

Title holders Benfica beat Marítimo 2–1 in the final and lifted the trophy for a sixth time.

== Format ==
The competition format for the 2014–15 edition consists of three rounds plus a knockout phase. In the first round, only teams competing in the 2014–15 Segunda Liga (excluding reserve teams from Primeira Liga clubs) take part. The eighteen teams are drawn into four groups (two with four teams and two with five), where each team plays against the others in a single round-robin format. The group winners and runners-up advance to the second round. In the second round, the eight teams that qualified from the previous round are joined by the five teams placed 11th–15th in the 2013–14 Primeira Liga and the three teams promoted to 2014–15 Primeira Liga. Two-legged ties are played between Primeira Liga and Segunda Liga teams, in a home-and-away system, and the winner advances to the third round. The third round features the eight winners of the previous round and the ten teams ranked 1st–10th in the 2013–14 Primeira Liga. Similarly to the first round, the eighteen teams are drawn into four groups (two with four teams and two with five) and play each other in a single round-robin format. The four third-round group winners qualify for the knockout phase, which consists of two semi-finals and one final, both decided in one-legged fixtures. The final is played at a neutral venue.

Round	Teams entering in this round	Teams advancing from previous round
First round (18 teams)	18 teams competing in the 2014–15 Segunda Liga	
Second round (16 teams)	5 teams ranked 11th–15th in the 2013–14 Primeira Liga; 3 teams promoted to the 2014–15 Primeira Liga	4 group winners from the first round; 4 group runners-up from the first round
Third round (18 teams)	10 teams ranked 1st–10th in the 2013–14 Primeira Liga	8 winners from the second round
Knockout phase (4 teams)		4 group winners from the third round

=== Tiebreakers ===
In the first and third rounds of the competition, teams are ranked according to points (3 points for a win, 1 point for a draw, 0 points for a loss). If two or more teams are tied on points on completion of the group matches, the following criteria are applied to determine the rankings:

1. highest goal difference in all group matches;
2. highest number of scored goals in all group matches;
3. lowest average age of all players fielded in all group matches (sum of the ages of all fielded players divided by the number of fielded players).

In all other rounds, teams tied at the end of regular time contest a penalty shootout to determine the winner. In the second round, teams are considered to be tied when they have equal aggregate scores at the end of both legs.

== Teams ==
The 36 teams competing in the two professional tiers of Portuguese football for the 2014–15 season are eligible to participate in this competition. For Primeira Liga teams, the final league position in the previous season determines if they enter in the second or third round of the Taça da Liga.

Third round (Primeira Liga)
Benfica (1st)	Sporting (2nd)	Porto (3rd)	Estoril (4th)
Nacional (5th)	Marítimo (6th)	Vitória de Setúbal (7th)	Académica de Coimbra (8th)
Braga (9th)	Vitória de Guimarães (10th)		
Second round (Primeira Liga)
Rio Ave (11th)	Arouca (12th)	Gil Vicente (13th)	Belenenses (14th)
Paços de Ferreira (15th)	Moreirense (P1)	Penafiel (P1)	Boavista (P1)
First round (Segunda Liga)
Olhanense (R1)	Desportivo das Aves (4th)	Portimonense (7th)	Chaves (8th)
Tondela (9th)	Farense (10th)	Académico de Viseu (11th)	Beira-Mar (12th)
União da Madeira (13th)	Feirense (14th)	Santa Clara (15th)	Sporting da Covilhã (16th)
Leixões (17th)	Oliveirense (18th)	Trofense (19th)	Atlético CP (22nd)
Freamunde (P2)	Oriental (P2)		

Key

- Nth: League position in the 2013–14 season
- P1: Promoted to the Primeira Liga
- P2: Promoted to the Segunda Liga
- R1: Relegated to the Segunda Liga

== First round ==
Kick-off times are in WEST (UTC+01:00).

=== Group A ===
Pos	Team	Pld	W	D	L	GF	GA	GD	Pts	Qualification
1	Chaves	3	2	1	0	5	2	+3	7	Advance to the second round
2	União da Madeira	3	2	0	1	4	1	+3	6	Advance to the second round
3	Oliveirense	3	1	1	1	5	5	0	4	
4	Farense	3	0	0	3	0	6	−6	0	

Source: LPFP
Rules for classification: Tiebreakers

26 July 2014	União da Madeira	3–0	Oliveirense	Funchal, Madeira
16:00	Talles Cunha 24', 44'; Mendy 26'	Report		Stadium: Estádio da Madeira; Attendance: 848; Referee: João Pinheiro

27 July 2014	Farense	0–2	Chaves	Faro
19:00		Report	João Patrão 2'; João Reis 51'	Stadium: Estádio de São Luís; Attendance: 711; Referee: André Narciso

30 July 2014	Oliveirense	3–0	Farense	Oliveira de Azeméis
20:00	Carlitos 46'; Yéro 52' (pen.); Rui Lima 86'	Report		Stadium: Estádio Carlos Osório; Attendance: 448; Referee: Luís Ferreira

30 July 2014	União da Madeira	0–1	Chaves	Funchal, Madeira
20:00		Report	Hugo Santos 9'	Stadium: Estádio da Madeira; Attendance: 652; Referee: Luís Godinho

3 August 2014	Chaves	2–2	Oliveirense	Chaves
16:00	Luís Pinto 40', 42'	Report	Ícaro 8' (o.g.); Rui Lima 90+3'	Stadium: Estádio Municipal de Chaves; Attendance: 660; Referee: Cosme Machado

3 August 2014	Farense	0–1	União da Madeira	Faro
16:00		Report	Mendy 25'	Stadium: Estádio de São Luís; Attendance: 419; Referee: Bruno Esteves

=== Group B ===
Pos	Team	Pld	W	D	L	GF	GA	GD	Pts	Qualification
1	Sporting da Covilhã	3	2	1	0	3	0	+3	7	Advance to the second round
2	Académico de Viseu	3	1	1	1	4	2	+2	4	Advance to the second round
3	Freamunde	3	1	1	1	1	2	−1	4	
4	Portimonense	3	0	1	2	1	5	−4	1	

Source: LPFP
Rules for classification: Tiebreakers

27 July 2014	Académico de Viseu	4–1	Portimonense	Viseu
16:00	Dalbert Henrique 10', 58'; Wendel 42'; Tiago Gonçalves 78'	Report	Kanazaki 54'	Stadium: Estádio do Fontelo; Attendance: 446; Referee: Tiago Antunes

27 July 2014	Sporting da Covilhã	2–0	Freamunde	Covilhã
17:00	Djikiné 23'; Adriano Castanheira 60'	Report		Stadium: Complexo Desportivo da Covilhã; Attendance: 396; Referee: Pedro Vilaça

30 July 2014	Freamunde	1–0	Académico de Viseu	Freamunde
19:00	Jô 53'	Report		Stadium: Complexo Desportivo do SC Freamunde; Referee: Ricardo Lourenço

30 July 2014	Sporting da Covilhã	1–0	Portimonense	Covilhã
20:00	Gilberto 37'	Report		Stadium: Complexo Desportivo da Covilhã; Attendance: 498; Referee: Bruno Paixão

3 August 2014	Portimonense	0–0	Freamunde	Portimão
17:00		Report		Stadium: Estádio Municipal; Attendance: 543; Referee: Paulo Baptista

3 August 2014	Académico de Viseu	0–0	Sporting da Covilhã	Viseu
17:00		Report		Stadium: Estádio do Fontelo; Attendance: 672; Referee: Manuel Mota

=== Group C ===
Pos	Team	Pld	W	D	L	GF	GA	GD	Pts	Qualification
1	Oriental	4	3	0	1	10	7	+3	9	Advance to the second round
2	Tondela	4	2	1	1	7	5	+2	7	Advance to the second round
3	Santa Clara	4	2	0	2	5	8	−3	6	
4	Leixões	4	1	1	2	4	3	+1	4	
5	Olhanense	4	0	2	2	3	6	−3	2	

Source: LPFP
Rules for classification: Tiebreakers

26 July 2014	Santa Clara	2–1	Olhanense	Ponta Delgada, Azores
17:00	Clemente 12' (pen.), 68'	Report	Celestino 52'	Stadium: Estádio de São Miguel; Attendance: 456; Referee: João Malheiro Pinto

27 July 2014	Tondela	1–0	Leixões	Tondela
17:00	Joel 8'	Report		Stadium: Estádio João Cardoso; Attendance: 475; Referee: André Moreira

30 July 2014	Leixões	3–0	Santa Clara	Matosinhos
17:00	Moedas 53' (pen.); Valente 55'; Mendes 88'	Report		Stadium: Estádio do Mar; Attendance: 459; Referee: Fábio Veríssimo

30 July 2014	Tondela	4–2	Oriental	Tondela
19:00	Amado 10'; Žildžović 29'; Joel Silva 43'; Luís Machado 73'	Report	Valdo Alhinho 75'; Carlos Saleiro 85' (pen.)	Stadium: Estádio João Cardoso; Attendance: 412; Referee: Vasco Santos

3 August 2014	Olhanense	1–1	Tondela	Olhão
17:00	André Pires 86'	Report	Amar 90+4'	Stadium: Estádio José Arcanjo; Attendance: 568; Referee: João Capela

3 August 2014	Oriental	2–1	Leixões	Lisbon
17:00	Evandro Roncatto 55'; Carlos Saleiro 72' (pen.)	Report	Valente 89'	Stadium: Campo Eng.º Carlos Salema; Attendance: 301; Referee: Nuno Almeida

13 August 2014	Leixões	0–0	Olhanense	Matosinhos
17:00		Report		Stadium: Estádio do Mar; Attendance: 448; Referee: Jorge Tavares

13 August 2014	Oriental	3–1	Santa Clara	Lisbon
17:00	Paixão 18'; Bastos 76'; D. Almeida 84'	Report	Evandro Roncatto 58'	Stadium: Campo Eng.º Carlos Salema; Attendance: 250; Referee: Tiago Martins

20 August 2014	Olhanense	1–3	Oriental	Olhão
16:00	Aguilar 1'	Report	Saleiro 30'; Córdoba 39'; D. Almeida 85'	Stadium: Estádio José Arcanjo; Attendance: 345; Referee: Bruno Paixão

20 August 2014	Santa Clara	2–1	Tondela	Ponta Delgada, Azores
16:00	Clemente 58' (pen.), 60'	Report	Barros 87'	Stadium: Estádio de São Miguel; Attendance: 275; Referee: Manuel Mota

=== Group D ===
Pos	Team	Pld	W	D	L	GF	GA	GD	Pts	Qualification
1	Trofense	4	4	0	0	5	1	+4	12	Advance to the second round
2	Atlético CP	4	2	1	1	6	2	+4	7	Advance to the second round
3	Desportivo das Aves	4	1	2	1	2	2	0	5	
4	Feirense	4	0	2	2	3	7	−4	2	
5	Beira-Mar	4	0	1	3	2	6	−4	1	

Source: LPFP
Rules for classification: Tiebreakers

26 July 2014	Beira-Mar	2–2	Feirense	Aveiro
17:00	Edú 39'; Sebaihi 48'	Report	Tonel 22'; Cafú 90+7'	Stadium: Estádio Municipal de Aveiro; Attendance: 433; Referee: Iancu Vasilica

27 July 2014	Atlético CP	0–0	Desportivo das Aves	Lisbon
17:00		Report		Stadium: Estádio da Tapadinha; Attendance: 390; Referee: Ricardo Baixinho

30 July 2014	Feirense	0–3	Atlético CP	Santa Maria da Feira
19:00		Report	Johnsen 60'; Ouattara 74'; Manuel Liz 85'	Stadium: Estádio Marcolino de Castro; Attendance: 283; Referee: Rui Oliveira

30 July 2014	Beira-Mar	0–1	Trofense	Trofa
19:00		Report	Rateira 34'	Stadium: Estádio do Clube Desportivo Trofense; Attendance: 477; Referee: Sérgio Piscarreta

3 August 2014	Desportivo das Aves	1–0	Beira-Mar	Vila das Aves
16:00	Pedro Pereira 73' (pen.)	Report		Stadium: Estádio do CD das Aves; Attendance: 398; Referee: Luís Ferreira

3 August 2014	Trofense	1–0	Feirense	Trofa
17:00	Dudu 90+4'	Report		Stadium: Estádio do Clube Desportivo Trofense; Attendance: 652; Referee: Marco Ferreira

13 August 2014	Feirense	1–1	Desportivo das Aves	Santa Maria da Feira
17:00	M. Vieira 27' (o.g.)	Report	Platiny 80'	Stadium: Estádio Marcolino de Castro; Attendance: 263; Referee: Artur Soares Dias

13 August 2014	Trofense	2–1	Atlético CP	Trofa
17:00	Riascos 75'; Nani 89'	Report	Liz 64'	Stadium: Estádio do Clube Desportivo Trofense; Attendance: 651; Referee: Carlos Xistra

20 August 2014	Atlético CP	2–0	Beira-Mar	Lisbon
17:00	Johnsen 69' (pen.); Jajá 90+3'	Report		Stadium: Estádio da Tapadinha; Attendance: 234; Referee: Vasco Santos

20 August 2014	Desportivo das Aves	0–1	Trofense	Vila das Aves
17:00		Report	Riascos 68'	Stadium: Estádio do CD das Aves; Attendance: 418; Referee: Paulo Baptista

== Second round ==
The draw for the second round was held on 3 September 2014 at 12:00. The sixteen teams involved in this draw were divided in two pots: one pot contained the eight teams progressing from the first round, and the other pot included the five teams that finished 11th–15th in the 2013–14 Primeira Liga and the three teams promoted to the top flight from the 2013–14 Segunda Liga. The first-leg matches were played on 24 September, and the second-leg matches were played on 29 October and 16 November 2014.

Team 1	Agg.	Team 2	1st leg	2nd leg
União da Madeira	6–4	Paços de Ferreira	4–2	2–2
Trofense	3–3 (4–5 p)	Moreirense	1–2	2–1
Atlético CP	1–3	Gil Vicente	0–2	1–1
Tondela	1–2	Arouca	1–1	0–1
Oriental	0–5	Boavista	0–0	0–5
Sporting da Covilhã	3–2	Penafiel	3–1	0–1
Chaves	1–1 (2–4 p)	Rio Ave	1–1	0–0
Académico de Viseu	3–3 (1–4 p)	Belenenses	3–1	0–2

== Third round ==
Kick-off times are in WET (UTC+0).

=== Group A ===
Pos	Team	Pld	W	D	L	GF	GA	GD	Pts	Qualification
1	Benfica	3	3	0	0	7	0	+7	9	Advances to the knockout phase
2	Moreirense	3	1	1	1	3	3	0	4	
3	Arouca	3	1	0	2	1	6	−5	3	
4	Nacional	3	0	1	2	1	3	−2	1	

Source: LPFP
Rules for classification: Tiebreakers

28 December 2014	Moreirense	2–0	Arouca	Moreira de Cónegos
16:00	Cardozo 3'; Battaglia 13'	Report		Stadium: Parque de Jogos Comendador Joaquim de Almeida Freitas; Attendance: 809; Referee: Rui Rodrigues

30 December 2014	Benfica	1–0	Nacional	Lisbon
21:15	Jonas 10'	Report		Stadium: Estádio da Luz; Attendance: 15,542; Referee: Nuno Almeida

14 January 2015	Nacional	1–1	Moreirense	Funchal
16:00	Witi 23'	Report	Gerso 45'	Stadium: Estádio da Madeira; Attendance: 317; Referee: Artur Soares Dias

14 January 2015	Benfica	4–0	Arouca	Lisbon
20:45	Pizzi 31' (pen.); Cristante 42'; Salvio 83'; Jonas 84'	Report		Stadium: Estádio da Luz; Attendance: 11,955; Referee: Bruno Esteves

21 January 2015	Arouca	1–0	Nacional	Arouca
16:00	Oliveira 56'	Report		Stadium: Estádio Municipal de Arouca; Attendance: 252; Referee: Bruno Paixão

21 January 2015	Moreirense	0–2	Benfica	Moreira de Cónegos
20:30		Report	Jonas 64'; Derley 67'	Stadium: Parque de Jogos Comendador Joaquim de Almeida Freitas; Attendance: 2,818; Referee: Jorge Tavares

=== Group B ===
Pos	Team	Pld	W	D	L	GF	GA	GD	Pts	Qualification
1	Marítimo	3	2	1	0	4	2	+2	7	Advances to the knockout phase
2	Sporting da Covilhã	3	2	0	1	6	5	+1	6	
3	Estoril	3	1	1	1	6	4	+2	4	
4	Gil Vicente	3	0	0	3	1	6	−5	0	

Source: LPFP
Rules for classification: Tiebreakers

28 December 2014	Sporting da Covilhã	2–1	Gil Vicente	Covilhã
15:00	Diogo Coelho 11'; Djikiné 37'	Report	Caetano 34'	Stadium: Estádio Municipal José dos Santos Pinto; Attendance: 339; Referee: Hugo Miguel

28 December 2014	Estoril	1–1	Marítimo	Estoril
16:00	Kléber 53'	Report	Dyego Sousa 2'	Stadium: Estádio António Coimbra da Mota; Attendance: 725; Referee: Duarte Gomes

13 January 2015	Estoril	3–0	Gil Vicente	Estoril
18:15	Kléber 15'; Cabrera 45'; Sebá 81'	Report		Stadium: Estádio António Coimbra da Mota; Attendance: 506; Referee: Fábio Veríssimo

14 January 2015	Marítimo	2–1	Sporting da Covilhã	Funchal
16:00	Moreira 6' (o.g.); Ebinho 50'	Report	Bilel 7'	Stadium: Estádio dos Barreiros; Attendance: 2,964; Referee: Paulo Baptista

21 January 2015	Gil Vicente	0–1	Marítimo	Barcelos
15:00		Report	Maâzou 44' (pen.)	Stadium: Estádio Cidade de Barcelos; Attendance: 361; Referee: Rui Costa

21 January 2015	Sporting da Covilhã	3–2	Estoril	Covilhã
15:00	Erivelto 49'; Bilel 56'; Cruz 90+3'	Report	Miguel 47', 90'	Stadium: Complexo Desportivo da Covilhã; Attendance: 404; Referee: Jorge Ferreira

=== Group C ===
Pos	Team	Pld	W	D	L	GF	GA	GD	Pts	Qualification
1	Vitória de Setúbal	4	2	2	0	8	3	+5	8	Advances to the knockout phase
2	Sporting CP	4	2	1	1	6	4	+2	7	
3	Belenenses	4	1	2	1	5	6	−1	5	
4	Vitória de Guimarães	4	1	1	2	4	6	−2	4	
5	Boavista	4	0	2	2	2	6	−4	2	

Source: LPFP
Rules for classification: Tiebreakers

28 December 2014	Boavista	0–0	Belenenses	Porto
19:15		Report		Stadium: Estádio do Bessa; Attendance: 2,474; Referee: Cosme Machado

29 December 2014	Vitória de Guimarães	0–2	Sporting CP	Guimarães
20:45		Report	Héldon 5'; Dramé 90+4'	Stadium: Estádio D. Afonso Henriques; Attendance: 7,844; Referee: Manuel Oliveira

14 January 2015	Belenenses	2–2	Vitória de Setúbal	Lisbon
19:00	Camará 21'; Rosa 82'	Report	Tavares 19' (pen.); Lourenço 23'	Stadium: Estádio do Restelo; Attendance: 1,126; Referee: Nuno Almeida

14 January 2015	Sporting CP	1–0	Boavista	Lisbon
19:15	Tanaka 74' (pen.)	Report		Stadium: Estádio José Alvalade; Attendance: 9,035; Referee: Luís Ferreira

21 January 2015	Vitória de Setúbal	2–0	Vitória de Guimarães	Setúbal
17:15	Schmidt 71' (pen.); Pelkas 76' (pen.)	Report		Stadium: Estádio do Bonfim; Attendance: 798; Referee: João Capela

21 January 2015	Belenenses	3–2	Sporting CP	Lisbon
19:15	Camará 38', 61' (pen.); Dálcio 55'	Report	Gauld 6', 19'	Stadium: Estádio do Restelo; Attendance: 2,243; Referee: Rui Rodrigues

28 January 2015	Sporting CP	1–1	Vitória de Setúbal	Lisbon
19:45	Santos 13' (o.g.)	Report	Lourenço 54'	Stadium: Estádio José Alvalade; Attendance: 9,084; Referee: Manuel Mota

28 January 2015	Boavista	2–2	Vitória de Guimarães	Porto
19:45	Pouga 10'; Abeyie 58'	Report	Caiado 51'; Ricardo 88'	Stadium: Estádio do Bessa; Attendance: 2,059; Referee: Jorge Sousa

4 February 2015	Vitória de Setúbal	3–0	Boavista	Setúbal
20:15	Suk Hyun-jun 5'; Pelkas 9'; Schmidt 53'	Report		Stadium: Estádio do Bonfim; Attendance: 1,172; Referee: Carlos Xistra

4 February 2015	Vitória de Guimarães	2–0	Belenenses	Guimarães
20:15	Gui 45'; Sami 88'	Report		Stadium: Estádio D. Afonso Henriques; Attendance: 2,404; Referee: Duarte Gomes

=== Group D ===
Pos	Team	Pld	W	D	L	GF	GA	GD	Pts	Qualification
1	Porto	4	3	1	0	9	3	+6	10	Advances to the knockout phase
2	Braga	4	2	1	1	5	3	+2	7	
3	Académica de Coimbra	4	2	0	2	5	6	−1	6	
4	União da Madeira	4	2	0	2	6	8	−2	6	
5	Rio Ave	4	0	0	4	1	6	−5	0	

Source: LPFP
Rules for classification: Tiebreakers

28 December 2014	União da Madeira	2–1	Braga	Ribeira Brava
16:00	Talles Cunha 27'; Rúben Andrade 49' (pen.)	Report	Alan 36'	Stadium: Centro Desportivo da Madeira; Attendance: 1,807; Referee: Tiago Martins

30 December 2014	Rio Ave	0–1	Porto	Vila do Conde
19:15		Report	Aboubakar 61'	Stadium: Estádio do Rio Ave FC; Attendance: 4,230; Referee: Rui Costa

13 January 2015	Porto	3–1	União da Madeira	Porto
20:15	Quintero 24'; Quaresma 54'; Evandro 86' (pen.)	Report	Martins 56'	Stadium: Estádio do Dragão; Attendance: 11,510; Referee: Rui Rodrigues

14 January 2015	Braga	1–0	Académica de Coimbra	Braga
16:30	Sasso 54'	Report		Stadium: Estádio Municipal de Braga; Attendance: 2,713; Referee: Marco Ferreira

21 January 2015	Académica de Coimbra	1–0	Rio Ave	Coimbra
16:00	Magique 65'	Report		Stadium: Estádio Cidade de Coimbra; Attendance: 582; Referee: Carlos Xistra

21 January 2015	Braga	1–1	Porto	Braga
20:45	Alan 52' (pen.)	Report	Evandro 25' (pen.)	Stadium: Estádio Municipal de Braga; Attendance: 8,393; Referee: Cosme Machado

28 January 2015	União da Madeira	2–1	Rio Ave	Ribeira Brava
20:45	Chaby 59'; Ayrton 72'	Report	Boateng 36'	Stadium: Centro Desportivo da Madeira; Attendance: 203; Referee: Manuel Oliveira

28 January 2015	Porto	4–1	Académica de Coimbra	Porto
20:45	Martínez 6', 59'; Paciência 75'; Evandro 80' (pen.)	Report	M'Bala 72'	Stadium: Estádio do Dragão; Attendance: 14,609; Referee: Tiago Martins

4 February 2015	Rio Ave	0–2	Braga	Vila do Conde
16:00		Report	T. Gomes 27'; Martins 45+2'	Stadium: Estádio do Rio Ave FC; Attendance: 630; Referee: João Capela

4 February 2015	Académica de Coimbra	3–1	União da Madeira	Coimbra
16:00	Olascuaga 27'; Capela 57'; Marinho 78'	Report	Chaby 10'	Stadium: Estádio Cidade de Coimbra; Attendance: 443; Referee: Vasco Santos

== Knockout phase ==
In the knockout phase, the four third-round group winners contested a one-legged semi-final match for a place in the competition final.

Semi-finals
11 February – Estádio da Luz
Benfica	3
Vitória de Setúbal	0
2 April – Estádio dos Barreiros
Marítimo	2
Porto	1

Final
29 May – Estádio Cidade de Coimbra
Benfica	2
Marítimo	1

=== Semi-finals ===
11 February 2015
19:45

Benfica	3–0	Vitória de Setúbal
Talisca 41' (pen.); Pizzi 45' (pen.); Jonas 73'	Report

Estádio da Luz, Lisbon
Attendance: 13,101
Referee: Rui Costa

2 April 2015
19:45

Marítimo	2–1	Porto
Gallo 37' (pen.); Marega 45'	Report	Evandro 32'

Estádio dos Barreiros, Funchal
Attendance: 5,127
Referee: Carlos Xistra

=== Final ===
29 May 2015
19:45

Benfica	2–1	Marítimo
Jonas 37'; John 80'	Report	Diogo 56'

Estádio Cidade de Coimbra, Coimbra
Attendance: 28,517
Referee: Carlos Xistra
