= 2015 Taça da Liga final =

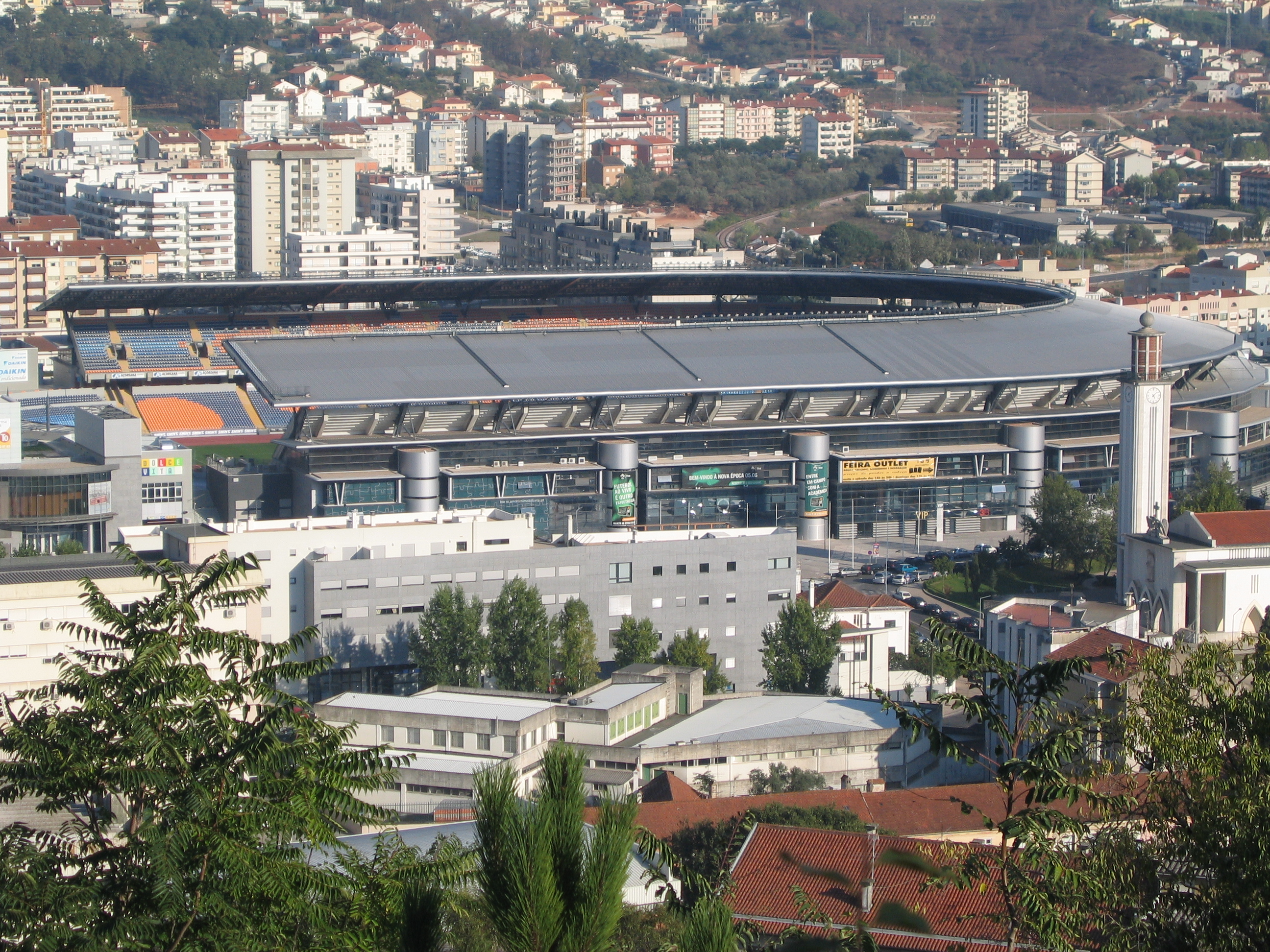
- Estádio Cidade de Coimbra
- Event: 2014–15 Taça da Liga
Benfica	Marítimo
2	1
- Date: 29 May 2015
- Venue: Estádio Cidade de Coimbra, Coimbra
- Man of the Match: Jonas (Benfica)
- Referee: Carlos Xistra (Castelo Branco)
- Attendance: 28,517
- Weather: Dry

The 2015 Taça da Liga final was the final match of the 2014–15 Taça da Liga, the eighth season of the Taça da Liga.

Trophy holders Benfica beat Marítimo (2–1) to win a record sixth title in the competition. Goal-line technology was introduced in the final, for the first time in Portugal.

== Route to the final ==
Note: In all results below, the score of the finalist is given first (H: home; A: away).

Benfica			Round	Marítimo		
Opponent	Result	Stadium	First round	Opponent	Result	Stadium
Bye			First round	Bye		
Opponent	Result	Stadium	Second round	Opponent	Result	Stadium
Bye			Second round	Bye		
Opponent	Result	Stadium	Third round	Opponent	Result	Stadium
Nacional	1–0 (H)	Estádio da Luz	Matchday 1	Estoril	1–1 (A)	Estádio António Coimbra da Mota
Arouca	4–0 (H)	Estádio da Luz	Matchday 2	Sporting da Covilhã	2–1 (H)	Estádio dos Barreiros
Moreirense	2–0 (A)	Parque de Jogos Almeida Freitas	Matchday 3	Gil Vicente	1–0 (A)	Estádio Cidade de Barcelos
Group A winners: Team / Pld / W / D / L / GF / GA / GD / Pts; Benfica / 3 / 3 / 0 / 0 / 7 / 0 / +7 / 9; Moreirense / 3 / 1 / 1 / 1 / 3 / 3 / 0 / 4; Arouca / 3 / 1 / 0 / 2 / 1 / 6 / –5 / 3; Nacional / 3 / 0 / 1 / 2 / 1 / 3 / −2 / 1			Final standings	Group B winners: Team / Pld / W / D / L / GF / GA / GD / Pts; Marítimo / 3 / 2 / 1 / 0 / 4 / 2 / +2 / 7; Sporting da Covilhã / 3 / 2 / 0 / 1 / 6 / 5 / +1 / 6; Estoril / 3 / 1 / 1 / 1 / 6 / 4 / +2 / 4; Gil Vicente / 3 / 0 / 0 / 3 / 1 / 6 / −5 / 0		
Opponent	Result	Stadium	Knockout phase	Opponent	Result	Stadium
Vitória de Setúbal	3–0 (H)	Estádio da Luz	Semi-finals	Porto	2–1 (H)	Estádio dos Barreiros

== Match ==
=== Details ===
29 May 2015
19:45 WEST (UTC+01:00)

Benfica	2–1	Marítimo
Jonas 37'; John 80'	Report	João Diogo 56'

Estádio Cidade de Coimbra, Coimbra
Attendance: 28,517
Referee: Carlos Xistra (Castelo Branco)

Benfica	Marítimo

GK	20	(Brazil) Júlio César
RB	14	(Uruguay) Maxi Pereira	(yellow card) 85'
CB	4	(Brazil) Luisão (c)	(yellow card) 90+3'
CB	33	(Brazil) Jardel
LB	19	(Portugal) Eliseu
RM	8	(Serbia) Miralem Sulejmani		(substituted off) 73'
CM	7	(Greece) Andreas Samaris
CM	21	(Portugal) Pizzi		(substituted off) 68'
LM	20	(Argentina) Nicolás Gaitán
CF	11	(Brazil) Lima		(substituted off) 83'
CF	17	(Brazil) Jonas	(yellow card) 86'
Substitutes:
GK	13	(Portugal) Paulo Lopes
DF	2	(Argentina) Lisandro López
DF	28	(Portugal) Sílvio
MF	5	(Serbia) Ljubomir Fejsa		(substituted on) 83'
MF	30	(Brazil) Talisca		(substituted on) 68'
FW	15	(Netherlands) Ola John	(yellow card) 81'	(substituted on) 73'
FW	9	(Brazil) Derley
Manager:
(Portugal) Jorge Jesus

GK	78	(France) Romain Salin
RB	21	(Portugal) Briguel	(yellow card) 32'
CB	5	(Germany) Patrick Bauer
CB	34	(Brazil) Raul Silva	(yellow card) 32' (yellow-red card) 48'
LB	26	(Portugal) Rúben Ferreira	(yellow card) 67'
CM	8	(Portugal) Danilo Pereira
CM	7	(Portugal) Alex Soares		(substituted off) 51'
CM	20	(Brazil) Bruno Gallo	(yellow card) 59'
FW	2	(Portugal) João Diogo
FW	32	(Mali) Moussa Marega	(yellow card) 36'	(substituted off) 75'
FW	50	(Portugal) António Xavier		(substituted off) 62'
Substitutes:
GK	1	(Brazil) Wellington
DF	4	(Brazil) Igor Rossi		(substituted on) 75'
MF	92	(Brazil) Éber Bessa	(yellow card) 85'	(substituted on) 62'
MF	37	(Brazil) Cristian Alex
MF	35	(Brazil) Fransérgio	(yellow card) 74'	(substituted on) 51'
FW	57	(Brazil) Ebinho
FW	93	(Portugal) Fábio Abreu
Manager:
(Portugal) Ivo Vieira

Man of the match

- (Brazil) Jonas (Benfica)

Match officials

- Assistant referees:
  - Luís Marcelino (Leiria)
  - Alexandre Freitas (Porto)
- Fourth official: Vasco Santos (Porto)

Match rules

- 90 minutes
- Penalty shoot-out if scores level after 90 minutes
- Seven named substitutes
- Maximum of three substitutions

== See also ==
- 2014–15 S.L. Benfica season
- 2015 Taça de Portugal final
