= 2016 Taça da Liga final =

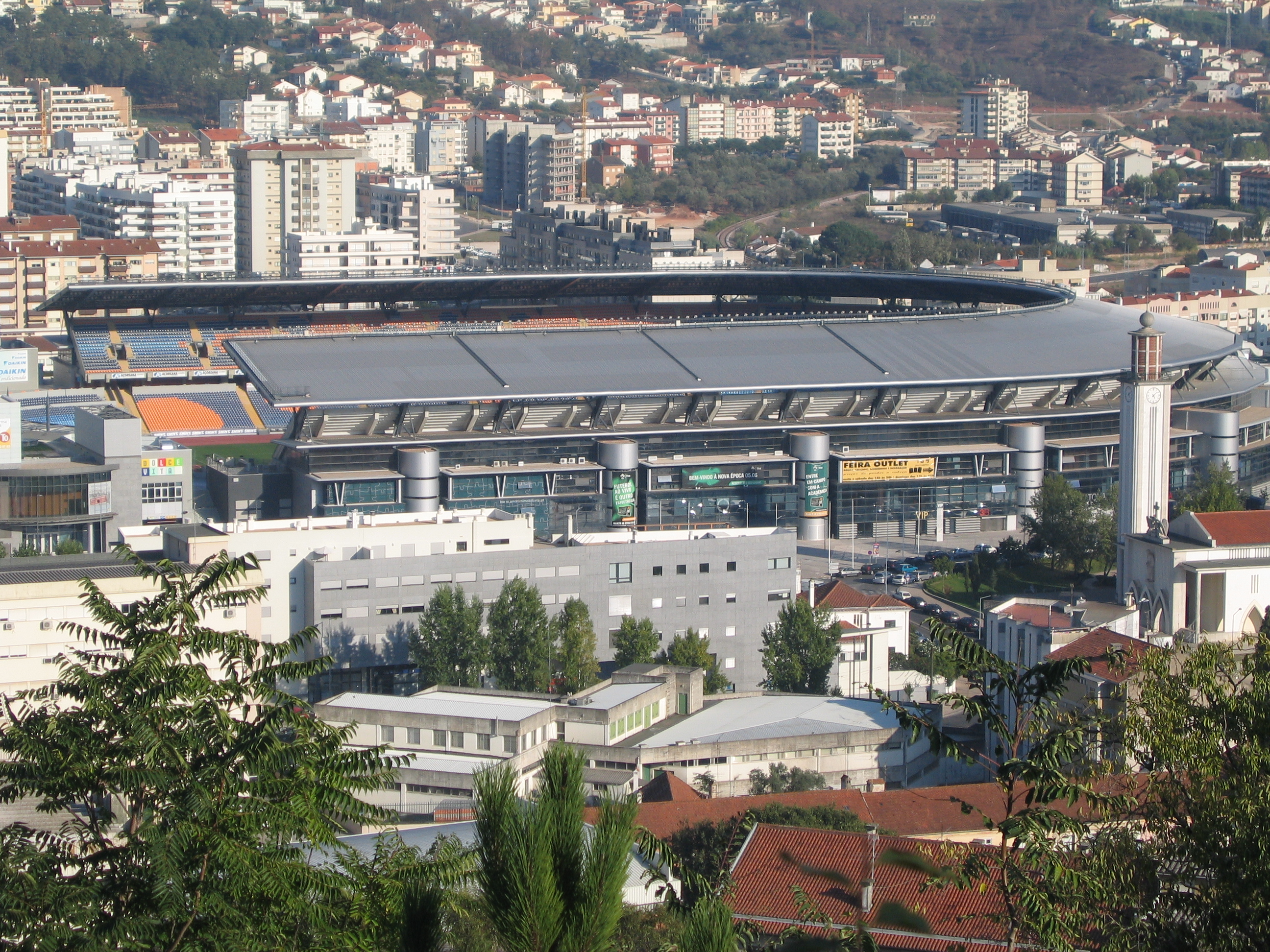
- Estádio Cidade de Coimbra
- Event: 2015–16 Taça da Liga
Marítimo	Benfica
2	6
- Date: 20 May 2016
- Venue: Estádio Cidade de Coimbra, Coimbra
- Man of the Match: Nicolás Gaitán (Benfica)
- Referee: Fábio Veríssimo (Leiria)
- Attendance: 28,878
- Weather: Dry

The 2016 Taça da Liga final was the final match of the 2015–16 Taça da Liga, the ninth season of the Taça da Liga.

Trophy holders Benfica beat Marítimo 6–2 (for the second consecutive final) to win a third consecutive and record seventh title in the competition, in a total of nine editions.

== Route to the final ==
Note: In all results below, the score of the finalist is given first (H: home; A: away).

Marítimo			Round	Benfica		
Opponent	Result	Stadium	First round	Opponent	Result	Stadium
Bye			First round	Bye		
Opponent	Result	Stadium	Second round	Opponent	Result	Stadium
Académica	2–1 (H)	Estádio dos Barreiros	Second round	Bye		
Opponent	Result	Stadium	Third round	Opponent	Result	Stadium
Feirense	4–2 (A)	Estádio Marcolino de Castro	Matchday 1	Nacional	1–0 (H)	Estádio da Luz
Porto	3–1 (A)	Estádio do Dragão	Matchday 2	Oriental	1–0 (A)	Campo Engenheiro Carlos Salema
Famalicão	0–0 (H)	Estádio dos Barreiros	Matchday 3	Moreirense	6–1 (A)	Parque de Jogos Almeida Freitas
Group A winners: Team / Pld / W / D / L / GF / GA / GD / Pts; Marítimo / 3 / 2 / 1 / 0 / 7 / 3 / +4 / 7; Feirense / 3 / 2 / 0 / 1 / 5 / 4 / +1 / 6; Famalicão / 3 / 1 / 1 / 1 / 1 / 1 / 0 / 3; Porto / 3 / 0 / 0 / 3 / 1 / 6 / −5 / 0			Final standings	Group B winners: Team / Pld / W / D / L / GF / GA / GD / Pts; Benfica / 3 / 3 / 0 / 0 / 8 / 1 / +7 / 9; Nacional / 3 / 1 / 1 / 1 / 1 / 1 / 0 / 4; Moreirense / 3 / 1 / 1 / 1 / 5 / 8 / –3 / 4; Oriental / 3 / 0 / 0 / 3 / 2 / 6 / –4 / 0		
Opponent	Result	Stadium	Knockout phase	Opponent	Result	Stadium
Portimonense	3–1 (H)	Estádio dos Barreiros	Semi-finals	Braga	2–1 (H)	Estádio da Luz

== Match ==
=== Details ===
20 May 2016
19:45 WEST (UTC+01:00)

Marítimo	2–6	Benfica
João Diogo 45+1'; Fransérgio 83' (pen.)	Report	Jonas 11'; Mitroglou 18', 38'; Gaitán 77'; Jardel 90+1'; Jiménez 90+3' (pen.)

Estádio Cidade de Coimbra, Coimbra
Attendance: 28,878
Referee: Fábio Veríssimo (Leiria)

Marítimo	Benfica

GK	80	(Iran) Alireza Haghighi
RB	21	(Portugal) Briguel (c)	(substituted off) 68'
CB	62	(Brazil) Maurício
CB	5	(Brazil) Dirceu	(substituted off) 73'
LB	91	(Brazil) Patrick
CM	23	(France) Damien Plessis
CM	35	(Brazil) Fransérgio
RW	2	(Portugal) João Diogo
AM	11	(Brazil) Éber Bessa
LW	12	(Portugal) Edgar Costa	(substituted off) 23'
CF	9	(Brazil) Dyego Sousa
Substitutes:
GK	78	(France) Romain Salin
DF	4	(Brazil) Deyvison
MF	7	(Portugal) Alex Soares	(substituted in) 68'
MF	10	(Armenia) Gevorg Ghazaryan	(substituted in) 73'
MF	17	(Curaçao) Gevaro Nepomuceno
FW	60	(Cameroon) Donald Djoussé	(substituted in) 23'
FW	90	(Senegal) Baba Diawara
Manager:
(Portugal) Nelo Vingada

GK	1	(Brazil) Ederson
RB	34	(Portugal) André Almeida
CB	4	(Brazil) Luisão (c)
CB	33	(Brazil) Jardel
LB	3	(Spain) Álex Grimaldo
RM	21	(Portugal) Pizzi
CM	7	(Greece) Andreas Samaris
CM	85	(Portugal) Renato Sanches
LM	10	(Argentina) Nicolás Gaitán	(substituted off) 78'
CF	11	(Greece) Kostas Mitroglou	(substituted off) 67'
CF	17	(Brazil) Jonas	(substituted off) 87'
Substitutes:
GK	13	(Portugal) Paulo Lopes
DF	14	(Sweden) Victor Lindelöf
DF	19	(Portugal) Eliseu
MF	20	(Portugal) Gonçalo Guedes	(substituted in) 78'
MF	30	(Brazil) Talisca	(substituted in) 67'
MF	39	(Morocco) Mehdi Carcela
FW	9	(Mexico) Raúl Jiménez	(substituted in) 87'
Manager:
(Portugal) Rui Vitória

Man of the Match:
Nicolás Gaitán (Benfica)

Assistant referees:
Paulo Soares (Coimbra)
Nuno Vicente (Santarém)
Fourth official:
António Godinho (Setúbal)
Additional assistant referees:
Carlos Xistra (Castelo Branco)
Sérgio Piscarreta (Algarve)

Match rules

- 90 minutes.
- Penalty shoot-out if scores still level.
- Seven named substitutes, of which up to three may be used.

=== Statistics ===
First half
	Marítimo	Benfica
Goals scored	1	3
Total shots	6	8
Shots on target	4	6
Ball possession	43%	57%
Corner kicks	3	0
Fouls committed	5	12
Offsides	4	1
Yellow cards	0	0
Red cards	0	0

Second half
	Marítimo	Benfica
Goals scored	1	3
Total shots	9	5
Shots on target	6	5
Ball possession	42%	58%
Corner kicks	1	1
Fouls committed	5	5
Offsides	3	1
Yellow cards	0	0
Red cards	0	0

Overall
	Marítimo	Benfica
Goals scored	2	6
Total shots	15	13
Shots on direct	10	11
Ball possession	42%	58%
Corner kicks	4	1
Fouls committed	10	17
Offsides	7	2
Yellow cards	0	0
Red cards	0	0

== See also ==
- 2015–16 S.L. Benfica season
- 2016 Taça de Portugal final
