= 2014–15 Primeira Liga =

81st season of top-tier Portuguese football

Primeira Liga
- Season: 2014–15
- Dates: 15 August 2014 – 23 May 2015
- Champions: Benfica; 34th title
- Relegated: Gil Vicente; Penafiel
- Champions League: Benfica; Porto; Sporting CP
- Europa League: Braga; Vitória de Guimarães; Belenenses
- Matches: 306
- Goals: 763 (2.49 per match)
- Best player: Jonas
- Top goalscorer: Jackson Martínez (21 goals)
- Best goalkeeper: Júlio César
- Biggest home win: Benfica 6–0 Estoril (28 February 2015)
- Biggest away win: V. Setúbal 0–5 Benfica (12 September 2014); Arouca 0–5 Porto (25 October 2014); Penafiel 1–6 Braga (29 November 2014); Gil Vicente 0–5 Benfica (2 May 2015)
- Highest scoring: Penafiel 1–6 Braga (29 November 2014)
- Longest winning run: 9 games Benfica
- Longest unbeaten run: 16 games Porto
- Longest winless run: 15 games Gil Vicente; Académica
- Longest losing run: 5 games Penafiel; Estoril
- Highest attendance: 63,534; Benfica 0–0 Porto (26 April 2015)
- Lowest attendance: 430; Arouca 1–3 Paços de Ferreira (26 April 2015)
- Total attendance: 3,091,276
- Average attendance: 10,102

The 2014–15 Primeira Liga (also known as Liga NOS for sponsorship reasons) was the 81st season of the Primeira Liga, the top professional league for Portuguese association football clubs. It began on 15 August 2014 and concluded on 23 May 2015.

On 17 May 2015, Benfica won their second consecutive and 34th overall title.

== Events ==
The league was scaled up to 18 teams, after the Court's rule to nullify Boavista's relegation from the Primeira Liga in the 2007–08 season. Boavista has been invited back in the Primeira Liga, after the club won a legal battle that eventually deemed their forced relegation five years ago unlawful. The club therefore went straight from the third level to the top league.

The league was named Liga ZON Sagres until 2013–14 after the sponsorship agreement between Sagres, ZON (now NOS) and the league ended. The league is named Liga NOS since 5 February 2015.

== Teams ==
=== Stadia and locations ===
Location of teams in Liga NOS 2014–15 (Mainland)
Location of teams in Liga NOS 2014–15 (Madeira)

Team	Home City	Stadium	Capacity	2013–14 finish
Académica	Coimbra	Estádio Cidade de Coimbra	30,210	8th
Arouca	Arouca	Estádio Municipal de Arouca	5,000	12th
Belenenses	Lisbon	Estádio do Restelo	19,300	14th
Benfica	Lisbon	Estádio da Luz	65,642	1st
Boavista	Porto	Estádio do Bessa	28,263	4th in the North Zone in C.N.
Braga	Braga	Estádio Municipal de Braga	30,154	9th
Estoril	Estoril	Estádio António Coimbra da Mota	8,000	4th
Gil Vicente	Barcelos	Estádio Cidade de Barcelos	12,504	13th
Marítimo	Funchal	Estádio dos Barreiros	7,000	6th
Moreirense	Moreira de Cónegos	Parque de Jogos Comendador Joaquim de Almeida Freitas	6,100	1st in Segunda Liga
Nacional	Funchal	Estádio da Madeira	5,142	5th
Paços de Ferreira	Paços de Ferreira	Estádio Capital do Móvel	5,250	15th and Play-off Winner
Penafiel	Penafiel	Estádio Municipal 25 de Abril	7,000	3rd in Segunda Liga
Porto	Porto	Estádio do Dragão	52,002	3rd
Rio Ave	Vila do Conde	Estádio dos Arcos	12,820	11th
Sporting CP	Lisbon	Estádio José Alvalade	52,466	2nd
Vitória de Guimarães	Guimarães	Estádio D. Afonso Henriques	30,146	10th
Vitória de Setúbal	Setúbal	Estádio do Bonfim	18,692	7th

=== Personnel and sponsors ===
Team	Head manager	Manufacturer	Sponsors
Académica	(Portugal) José Viterbo	Nike	EFAPEL
Arouca	(Portugal) Pedro Emanuel	Macron	Banco BIC
Belenenses	(Portugal) Jorge Simão	Lacatoni	—
Benfica	(Portugal) Jorge Jesus	Adidas	MEO (home); Moche (away)
Boavista	(Portugal) Petit	Erreà	Mestre da Cor
Braga	(Portugal) Sérgio Conceição	Macron	Banco BIC
Estoril	(Portugal) Hugo Leal (Brazil) Fabiano	Hummel	Banco BIC
Gil Vicente	(Portugal) José Mota	Macron	Barcelos
Marítimo	(Portugal) Ivo Vieira	Lacatoni	BANIF
Moreirense	(Portugal) Miguel Leal	cdt	—
Nacional	(Portugal) Manuel Machado	Hummel	BANIF
Paços de Ferreira	(Portugal) Paulo Fonseca	Lacatoni	Banco BIC
Penafiel	(Portugal) Carlos Brito	Desportreino	Banco BIC
Porto	(Spain) Julen Lopetegui	Warrior	MEO (home); Moche (away)
Rio Ave	(Portugal) Pedro Martins	Lacatoni	—
Sporting CP	(Portugal) Marco Silva	Macron	MEO (home); Moche (away)
Vitória de Guimarães	(Portugal) Rui Vitória	Nike	Banco BIC
Vitória de Setúbal	(Portugal) Bruno Ribeiro	Hummel	KIA

=== Managerial changes ===
Team	Outgoing manager	Manner of departure	Date of vacancy	Position in table	Incoming manager	Date of appointment
Marítimo	(Portugal) Pedro Martins	Resigned	11 May 2014	Pre-season	(Portugal) Leonel Pontes	8 May 2014
Porto	(Portugal) Luís Castro	Contract expired	11 May 2014	Pre-season	(Spain) Julen Lopetegui	6 May 2014
Braga	(Portugal) Jorge Paixão	Contract expired	11 May 2014	Pre-season	(Portugal) Sérgio Conceição	26 May 2014
Estoril	(Portugal) Marco Silva	Resigned	12 May 2014	Pre-season	(Portugal) José Couceiro	24 May 2014
Vitória de Setúbal	(Portugal) José Couceiro	Mutual agreement	15 May 2014	Pre-season	(Portugal) Domingos Paciência	22 May 2014
Moreirense	(Portugal) Toni Conceição	Mutual agreement	15 May 2014	Pre-season	(Portugal) Miguel Leal	16 May 2014
Penafiel	(Portugal) Miguel Leal	Signed by Moreirense	16 May 2014	Pre-season	(Portugal) Ricardo Chéu	16 May 2014
Rio Ave	(Portugal) Nuno Espírito Santo	Resigned	19 May 2014	Pre-season	(Portugal) Pedro Martins	22 May 2014
Sporting CP	(Portugal) Leonardo Jardim	Signed by Monaco	21 May 2014	Pre-season	(Portugal) Marco Silva	21 May 2014
Académica	(Portugal) Sérgio Conceição	Signed by Braga	26 May 2014	Pre-season	(Portugal) Paulo Sérgio	31 May 2014
Gil Vicente	(Portugal) João de Deus	Mutual agreement	31 August 2014	17th	(Portugal) José Mota	2 September 2014
Penafiel	(Portugal) Ricardo Chéu	Mutual agreement	16 September 2014	18th	(Portugal) Rui Quinta	16 September 2014
Vitória de Setúbal	(Portugal) Domingos Paciência	Mutual agreement	19 January 2015	15th	(Portugal) Bruno Ribeiro	20 January 2015
Académica	(Portugal) Paulo Sérgio	Resigned	17 February 2015	17th	(Portugal) José Viterbo	18 February 2015
Estoril	(Portugal) José Couceiro	Resigned	3 March 2015	12th	(Portugal) Hugo Leal (Brazil) Fabiano	3 March 2015
Marítimo	(Portugal) Leonel Pontes	Resigned	3 March 2015	11th	(Portugal) Ivo Vieira	4 March 2015
Penafiel	(Portugal) Rui Quinta	Mutual agreement	16 March 2015	18th	(Portugal) Carlos Brito	19 March 2015
Belenenses	(Angola) Lito Vidigal	Resigned	17 March 2015	7th	(Portugal) Jorge Simão	20 March 2015

== Season summary ==
=== League table ===
Pos	Team	Pld	W	D	L	GF	GA	GD	Pts	Qualification or relegation
1	Benfica (C)	34	27	4	3	86	16	+70	85	Qualification for the Champions League group stage
2	Porto	34	25	7	2	74	13	+61	82	Qualification for the Champions League group stage
3	Sporting CP	34	22	10	2	67	29	+38	76	Qualification for the Champions League play-off round
4	Braga	34	17	7	10	55	28	+27	58	Qualification for the Europa League group stage (Note: Since Sporting CP won the 2014–15 Taça de Portugal, the spot awarded to the cup winner (Europa League group stage) was passed to the fourth-placed team and the spot originally meant for the fourth-placed team (Europa League third qualifying round) was given to the sixth-placed team.)
5	Vitória de Guimarães	34	15	10	9	50	35	+15	55	Qualification for the Europa League third qualifying round
6	Belenenses	34	12	12	10	34	35	−1	48	Qualification for the Europa League third qualifying round
7	Nacional	34	13	8	13	45	46	−1	47	
8	Paços de Ferreira	34	12	11	11	40	45	−5	47	
9	Marítimo	34	12	8	14	46	45	+1	44	
10	Rio Ave	34	10	13	11	38	42	−4	43	
11	Moreirense	34	11	10	13	33	42	−9	43	
12	Estoril	34	9	13	12	38	56	−18	40	
13	Boavista	34	9	7	18	27	50	−23	34	
14	Vitória de Setúbal	34	7	8	19	24	56	−32	29	
15	Académica	34	4	17	13	26	46	−20	29	
16	Arouca	34	7	7	20	26	50	−24	28	
17	Gil Vicente (R)	34	4	11	19	25	60	−35	23	Relegation to LigaPro
18	Penafiel (R)	34	5	7	22	29	69	−40	22	Relegation to LigaPro

Source: LPFP
Rules for classification: 1) points; 2) points in matches between tied teams; 3) goal difference in matches between tied teams; 4) away goals in matches between tied teams; 5) goal difference; 6) wins; 7) goals scored. The LPFP decided that only criteria 1, 5, 6 and 7 would be applied to establish the classification during the competition. Qualification for the 2015–16 Europa League has changed: the best-placed non-qualified domestic championship club will enter the UEFA Europa League from the 2015–16 season, rather than the domestic cup runners-up, should the domestic cup winners also qualify for the UEFA Champions League via the final championship standings.
(C) Champions; (R) Relegated

=== Positions by round ===
Team ╲ Round	1	2	3	4	5	6	7	8	9	10	11	12	13	14	15	16	17	18	19	20	21	22	23	24	25	26	27	28	29	30	31	32	33	34
Benfica	4	4	5	3	1	1	1	1	1	1	1	1	1	1	1	1	1	1	1	1	1	1	1	1	1	1	1	1	1	1	1	1	1	1
Porto	5	5	3	4	3	2	2	2	2	3	3	2	2	2	2	2	2	2	2	2	2	2	2	2	2	2	2	2	2	2	2	2	2	2
Sporting CP	11	7	8	8	6	7	4	4	6	8	6	4	5	5	4	3	3	3	3	3	3	3	3	3	3	3	3	3	3	3	3	3	3	3
Braga	1	6	4	6	8	4	7	6	7	5	4	5	4	3	5	5	5	5	5	4	4	4	4	4	4	4	4	4	4	4	4	4	4	4
Vitória de Guimarães	3	2	2	2	2	5	3	3	3	2	2	3	3	4	3	4	4	4	4	5	5	5	5	5	5	5	5	5	5	5	5	5	5	5
Belenenses	2	3	6	7	5	8	9	8	5	4	5	6	7	7	7	8	6	6	7	6	6	6	6	6	6	8	6	6	6	6	7	7	7	6
Nacional	12	14	11	14	13	16	16	11	13	15	14	12	13	13	14	13	12	12	12	9	9	9	8	8	9	9	9	9	9	8	9	10	9	7
Paços de Ferreira	16	15	12	11	10	9	8	7	4	6	7	7	6	6	8	7	9	7	8	7	8	7	7	7	7	6	7	7	7	7	6	6	6	8
Marítimo	15	10	7	5	7	3	5	9	10	10	9	10	10	11	10	10	11	11	10	11	10	10	11	10	11	11	10	10	10	10	10	9	8	9
Rio Ave	6	1	1	1	4	6	6	5	8	7	8	8	8	8	6	6	7	9	6	8	7	8	9	9	8	7	8	8	8	9	8	8	10	10
Moreirense	7	8	10	9	12	14	12	10	9	9	10	9	9	9	9	9	8	10	11	12	11	11	10	11	10	10	11	11	11	11	11	11	11	11
Estoril	10	13	15	12	11	15	15	16	11	12	11	11	11	10	11	11	10	8	9	10	12	12	12	12	12	12	13	12	12	12	12	12	12	12
Boavista	18	17	18	15	15	12	14	14	16	13	13	14	12	12	12	12	13	13	13	13	13	13	13	13	14	13	12	13	13	13	13	13	13	13
Vitória de Setúbal	17	9	9	13	14	11	10	12	14	11	12	13	14	16	13	15	15	14	14	14	14	15	16	16	15	15	15	15	16	16	16	16	15	14
Académica	8	11	13	16	16	13	11	13	12	14	16	16	16	17	16	16	16	16	16	16	17	16	15	14	13	14	14	14	14	14	14	14	14	15
Arouca	9	12	14	10	9	10	13	15	15	16	15	15	17	14	15	14	14	15	15	15	16	14	14	15	16	16	16	16	15	15	15	15	16	16
Gil Vicente	13	16	16	17	18	18	18	18	18	18	17	18	18	18	18	18	18	18	18	17	15	17	17	17	17	17	17	17	17	17	17	17	17	17
Penafiel	14	18	17	18	17	17	17	17	17	17	18	17	15	15	17	17	17	17	17	18	18	18	18	18	18	18	18	18	18	18	18	18	18	18

Leader
2015–16 UEFA Champions League Group stage
2015–16 UEFA Champions League Play-off round
2015–16 UEFA Europa League Third qualifying round
Relegation to 2015–16 Segunda Liga

== Results ==
Home \ Away	ACA	ARO	BEL	BEN	BOA	BRA	EST	GVI	MAR	MOR	NAC	PAÇ	PEN	POR	RAV	SCP	VGU	VSE
Académica		1–1	1–1	0–2	0–0	1–1	2–2	1–2	1–1	0–0	2–1	2–2	1–1	0–3	0–0	1–1	2–4	1–1
Arouca	0–1		0–1	1–3	0–0	1–0	1–1	3–1	1–0	1–2	3–3	1–3	0–1	0–5	1–0	1–3	1–2	1–0
Belenenses	0–0	0–0		0–2	3–1	0–1	2–2	2–0	1–0	2–0	3–1	0–1	0–0	1–1	1–3	1–1	0–3	1–1
Benfica	5–1	4–0	3–0		3–0	2–0	6–0	1–0	4–1	3–1	3–1	2–0	4–0	0–0	1–0	1–1	3–0	3–0
Boavista	1–0	3–1	1–0	0–1		1–0	1–2	3–2	0–2	3–1	0–1	1–2	1–0	0–2	1–1	1–3	3–1	0–0
Braga	0–0	2–0	1–1	2–1	3–0		2–1	2–0	1–3	1–0	3–1	3–0	4–0	0–1	3–0	0–1	0–0	5–0
Estoril	1–2	1–0	1–2	2–3	2–0	0–2		1–1	1–1	1–1	2–1	1–0	3–3	2–2	1–5	1–1	1–0	1–0
Gil Vicente	1–1	1–1	0–2	0–5	1–1	0–2	1–1		1–2	0–1	0–0	1–0	2–1	1–5	0–0	0–4	1–3	1–1
Marítimo	2–1	1–1	1–2	0–4	4–0	2–1	0–0	1–2		1–2	1–1	2–1	2–0	1–0	4–0	0–1	4–0	1–1
Moreirense	0–2	1–0	0–1	1–3	1–0	0–0	1–1	2–0	1–1		2–3	2–0	0–0	0–2	1–1	1–4	2–1	3–1
Nacional	1–0	2–0	2–1	1–2	2–1	1–1	1–0	3–2	3–0	0–1		3–0	2–0	1–1	0–0	0–1	2–2	3–0
Paços de Ferreira	3–2	2–1	2–0	1–0	1–0	2–2	1–1	1–1	3–2	0–0	2–3		2–1	0–1	1–2	1–1	2–2	4–1
Penafiel	0–0	0–2	1–3	0–3	2–2	1–6	1–2	2–1	3–4	1–2	2–1	0–1		1–3	0–2	0–4	1–1	2–0
Porto	1–0	1–0	3–0	0–2	0–0	2–1	5–0	2–0	2–0	3–0	2–0	5–0	2–0		5–0	3–0	1–0	4–0
Rio Ave	3–0	1–2	0–0	2–1	4–0	0–2	2–1	0–0	0–0	1–1	1–1	0–0	3–2	1–3		0–1	1–1	2–0
Sporting CP	1–0	1–0	1–1	1–1	2–1	4–1	3–0	2–0	4–2	1–1	2–0	1–1	3–2	1–1	4–2		4–1	3–0
Vitória de Guimarães	4–0	1–0	0–1	0–0	3–0	1–0	2–0	2–2	1–0	2–1	4–0	1–1	3–0	1–1	0–0	3–0		0–1
Vitória de Setúbal	0–0	2–1	1–1	0–5	0–1	1–3	1–2	2–0	1–0	2–1	2–0	0–0	0–1	0–2	4–1	1–2	0–1	

Source: LPFP (in Portuguese)
Legend: Blue = home team win; Yellow = draw; Red = away team win.

== Season statistics ==
=== Top scorers ===
As of match played 23 May 2015

Rank	Player	Club	Goals
1	(Colombia) Jackson Martínez	Porto	21
2	(Brazil) Jonas	Benfica	20
3	(Brazil) Lima	Benfica	19
4	(Portugal) Marco Matias	Nacional	17
5	(Algeria) Islam Slimani	Sporting CP	12
5	(Egypt) Ahmed Hassan	Rio Ave	12
7	(Colombia) Fredy Montero	Sporting CP	11
7	(Portugal) André André	Vitória de Guimarães	11
9	(Portugal) Eder	Braga	10
9	(Portugal) Bruno Moreira	Paços de Ferreira	10

=== Hat-tricks ===
Player	For	Against	Result	Date
(Egypt) Ahmed Hassan	Rio Ave	Estoril	1–5	24 August 2014
(Brazil) Talisca	Benfica	Vitória de Setúbal	0–5	12 September 2014
(Portugal) André André	Vitória de Guimarães	Nacional	4–0	4 January 2015
(Venezuela) Mario Rondón	Nacional	Arouca	3–3	8 February 2015
(Spain) Cristian Tello	Porto	Sporting CP	3–0	1 March 2015

== Awards ==
=== SJPF Player of the Month ===
Month	Player	Club
August/September	(Brazil) Talisca	Benfica
October/November	(Portugal) Nani	Sporting CP
December	(Colombia) Jackson Martínez	Porto
January	(Colombia) Jackson Martínez	Porto
February	(Brazil) Jonas	Benfica
March	(Spain) Cristian Tello	Porto
April	(Brazil) Jonas	Benfica

=== SJPF Young Player of the Month ===
Month	Player	Club
August/September	(Portugal) Sérgio Oliveira	Paços de Ferreira
October/November	(Portugal) Hernâni	Porto
December	(Portugal) Rafa Silva	Braga
January	(Portugal) João Mário	Sporting CP
February	(Portugal) Tobias Figueiredo	Sporting CP
March	(Portugal) Filipe Ferreira	Belenenses
April	(Portugal) Afonso Figueiredo	Boavista

==== Team of the Year ====

Team of the Year

Team of the Year
Goalkeeper	(Brazil) Júlio César (Benfica)			
Defenders	(Brazil) Danilo (Porto)	(Brazil) Luisão (Benfica)	(Brazil) Jardel (Benfica)	(Brazil) Alex Sandro (Porto)
Midfielders	(Brazil) Casemiro (Porto)		(Spain) Óliver Torres (Porto)	(Portugal) Pizzi (Benfica)
Forwards	(Argentina) Nicolás Gaitán (Benfica)		(Colombia) Jackson Martínez (Porto)	(Brazil) Jonas (Benfica)

== Attendances ==
#	Club	Average	Highest
1	Benfica	48,520	63,534
2	Sporting	34,988	49,076
3	Porto	31,831	48,109
4	Vitória SC	15,906	28,875
5	Braga	10,682	21,078
6	Académica	5,154	19,029
7	Boavista	4,614	10,702
8	Marítimo	4,566	7,097
9	Vitória FC	3,406	10,000
10	Os Belenenses	3,303	15,137
11	Gil Vicente	3,150	8,532
12	Paços de Ferreira	3,053	6,404
13	Rio Ave	2,968	9,692
14	CD Nacional	2,163	5,239
15	Moreirense	2,151	5,793
16	Estoril	2,071	7,587
17	Arouca	1,718	6,960
18	Penafiel	1,579	5,217
