= LPFP Primeira Liga Player of the Year =

Annual football award

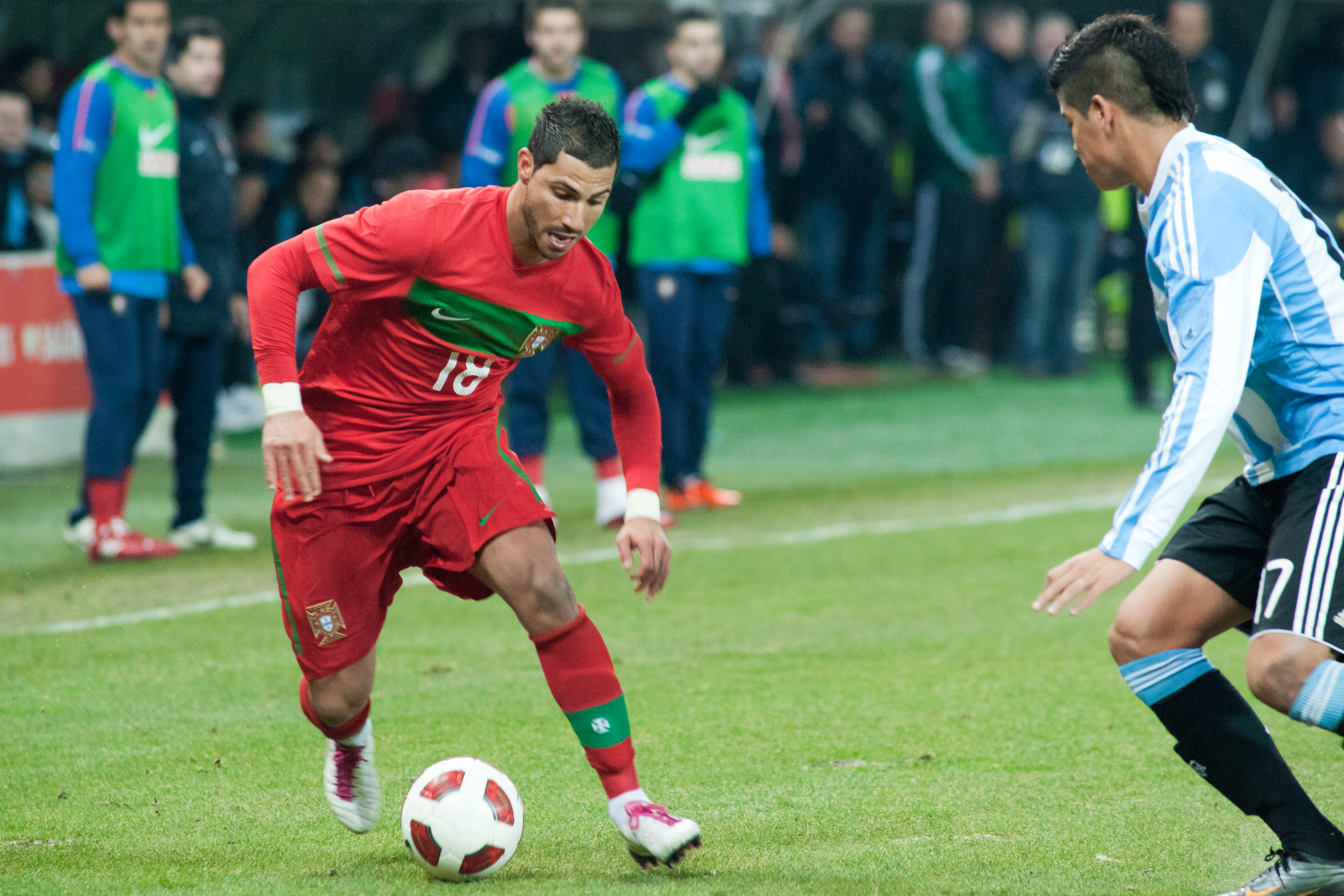
Ricardo Quaresma was the first player to win the award.

The Portuguese League for Professional Football Primeira Liga Player of the Year (often called the LPFP Primeira Liga Player of the Year, the Primeira Liga Player of the Year or simply the Player of the Year) is an annual award given to the player who is adjudged to have been the best of the year in Primeira Liga. Between 2006 and 2010 the winner was chosen only by a vote amongst the members of Sports National Press Club (CNID). Since 2011, thanks to new sponsorship agreements, all the awards related to football belong to Portuguese League for Professional Football (LPFP) and are chosen by a vote amongst their associated.

The award has been presented officially since the 2005–06 season, when the inaugural winner was Ricardo Quaresma. That trophy was delivered during the celebration of Sports National Press Club (CNID) 40th anniversary. Since the 2011–12 season, the award ceremony takes place at Palácio do Freixo, in Porto, Portugal. All Primeira Liga draws are also performed during the same event. The first non-Portuguese to win the award was Lisandro López after the 2007–08 season. In 2012, Hulk became the first player to win the award twice, followed by Jonas in 2016, Bruno Fernandes in 2019 and Viktor Gyökeres in 2025.

== Winners ==
=== List of winners ===
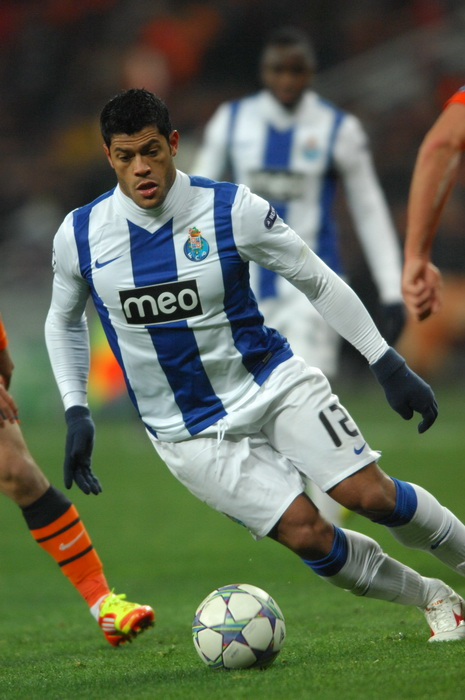
Hulk became the first player to win the award two times.

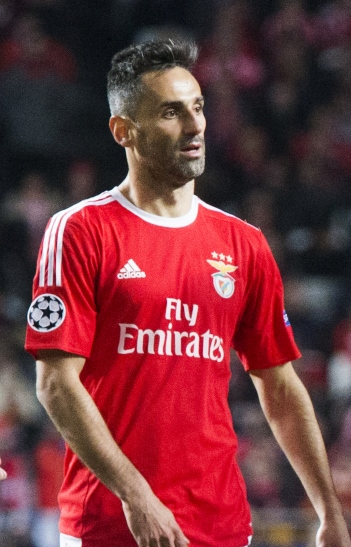
Jonas became the second player to win the award twice.

This award has been presented on 21 occasions as of 2026, with 17 different winners. The table indicates the winners and their information, including country, club and position. Every winner was playing for one of the Big Three.

Season	Player	Nationality	Club	Position	Sources	Notes
2005–06	Ricardo Quaresma	Portugal	Porto	Winger		
2006–07	Simão Sabrosa	Portugal	Benfica	Winger		
2007–08	Lisandro López	Argentina	Porto	Striker		^{[A]}
2008–09	Bruno Alves	Portugal	Porto	Centre back		
2009–10	David Luiz	Brazil	Benfica	Centre back		
2010–11	Hulk	Brazil	Porto	Winger		
2011–12	Hulk	Brazil	Porto	Winger		^{[B]}
2012–13	Nemanja Matić	Serbia	Benfica	Midfielder		^{[C]}
2013–14	Enzo Pérez	Argentina	Benfica	Midfielder		
2014–15	Jonas	Brazil	Benfica	Striker		
2015–16	Jonas	Brazil	Benfica	Striker		
2016–17	Pizzi	Portugal	Benfica	Midfielder		
2017–18	Bruno Fernandes	Portugal	Sporting CP	Midfielder		
2018–19	Bruno Fernandes	Portugal	Sporting CP	Midfielder		
2019–20	Jesús Corona	Mexico	Porto	Winger		
2020–21	Sebastián Coates	Uruguay	Sporting CP	Centre back		
2021–22	Darwin Núñez	Uruguay	Benfica	Striker		
2022–23	Otávio	Portugal	Porto	Midfielder		
2023–24	Viktor Gyökeres	Sweden	Sporting CP	Striker		
2024–25	Viktor Gyökeres	Sweden	Sporting CP	Striker		
2025–26	Victor Froholdt	Denmark	Porto	Midfielder		^{[D]}

=== Breakdown of winners ===
By country

Rank	Country	Number of wins	Winning years
1	Portugal	7	2006, 2007, 2009, 2017, 2018, 2019, 2023
2	Brazil	5	2010, 2011, 2012, 2015, 2016
3	Argentina	2	2008, 2014
3	Sweden	2	2024, 2025
3	Uruguay	2	2021, 2022
6	Serbia	1	2013
6	Mexico	1	2020
6	Denmark	1	2026

By club

Rank	Club	Number of wins	Winning years
1	Benfica	8	2007, 2010, 2013, 2014, 2015, 2016, 2017, 2022
1	Porto	8	2006, 2008, 2009, 2011, 2012, 2020, 2023, 2026
3	Sporting CP	5	2018, 2019, 2021, 2024, 2025

== Notes ==
A. First non-Portuguese player to win the award.
B. First player to win the award twice.
C. First non-Portuguese European player to win the award.
D. Also won Primeira Liga Young Player of the Year Award.
