= Manuel Liz =

Portuguese footballer (born 1989)

Personal information
- Full name: Manuel Miguel Afonso Pedroso Liz Rodrigues
- Date of birth: 30 November 1989 (age 36)
- Place of birth: Lisbon, Portugal
- Height: 1.80 m (5 ft 11 in)
- Positions: Right back; right winger

Youth career
- 1999–2008: Torreense

Senior career*
Years	Team	Apps	(Gls)
2008–2009	Torreense	12	(0)
2009–2010	Igreja Nova	20	(0)
2010–2012	Sintrense	63	(14)
2012–2014	Benfica	0	(0)
2012–2013	→ Fátima (loan)	16	(4)
2014–2015	Atlético	24	(0)
2015–2017	Sintrense	58	(3)
2017–2018	1º Dezembro	27	(4)
2018	Loures	10	(0)
2018–2020	Alverca	27	(6)
2020–2024	1º Dezembro	62	(13)
- * Club domestic league appearances and goals as of 1 July 2024

Manuel Miguel Afonso Pedroso Liz Rodrigues (born 30 November 1989) is a Portuguese professional footballer who plays as a right winger.

== Career ==
Born in Lisbon, Liz is a youth graduate from S.C.U. Torreense, joining them in 1999 and staying there for nine seasons, debuting for the first team on 24 August 2008 in the third tier.

After two seasons, he joined Sport União Sintrense in the fourth tier, racking up more than sixty league games in two seasons, sparking the interest of S.L. Benfica which signed him and teammate Nélson Semedo on 12 January 2012.

His first season was spent at C.D. Fátima, signing a loan deal on 9 August 2012. When he started the second season, he was not registered with the reserve side, spending six months without competing, until he joined Atlético CP on a 3 1/2-year contract on 26 January 2014.

On 23 January 2014, Liz made his professional debut with Atlético in a Segunda Liga match against Portimonense. He left Atlético at the end of the season and returned to Sintrense.
