= Daniel Almeida =

Portuguese footballer (born 1984)

Personal information
- Full name: Daniel Santa Cruz Ferreira Almeida
- Date of birth: 22 April 1984 (age 42)
- Place of birth: Lisbon, Portugal
- Height: 1.87 m (6 ft 2 in)
- Position: Defender

Youth career
- 1997–2002: Odivelas

Senior career*
Years	Team	Apps	(Gls)
2002–2004	Odivelas	6	(0)
2004–2005	União Santiago		
2005–2007	Sintrense		
2007–2008	Real	9	(0)
2008–2009	Sintrense	25	(16)
2009–2010	Igreja Nova	29	(3)
2010–2017	Oriental	172	(18)
2017–2018	Cova da Piedade	33	(2)
2018–2019	Vilafranquense	16	(1)
2019–2021	Real	40	(4)
2021–2024	Atlético CP	48	(1)
- * Club domestic league appearances and goals

Daniel Santa Cruz Ferreira Almeida (born 22 April 1984), simply known as Daniel Almeida is a Portuguese former professional footballer who played as a defender.

== Club career ==
Born in Lisbon, Almeida kicked off his career with Odivelas with whom he made first team debut. He made 6 appearances in two seasons, before plying his trade in lower division clubs with União Santiago and Sintrense between 2004 and 2007.

He then joined Real. He failed to make first team impact and hence rejoined Sintrense to get more first team opportunities. During his second time in Sintrense, he made a record by scoring 7 goals in a match against Rio Maior. Scoring 16 goals in 25 league matches, he switched clubs joining Igreja Nova in 2009.

In 2010, he signed for Oriental. He became an important member of the team. Since then he has made more than 20 appearances in each season for the club. He played a crucial role in the club's promotion to Segunda Liga in 2013, making 32 appearances, scoring in 4 in the 2013–14 season.
