= João Diogo (footballer, born 1988) =

Portuguese footballer

Personal information
- Full name: João Diogo Gomes de Freitas
- Date of birth: 28 February 1988 (age 38)
- Place of birth: Funchal, Portugal
- Height: 1.75 m (5 ft 9 in)
- Position: Right-back

Youth career
- 1996−2007: Marítimo

Senior career*
Years	Team	Apps	(Gls)
2007–2015	Marítimo B	108	(7)
2011–2016	Marítimo	89	(2)
2016–2017	Belenenses	31	(2)
2018	Gaz Metan Mediaș	9	(2)
2019	Farul Constanța	17	(1)
2019	Spartak Trnava	16	(0)
2020–2021	Estoril	23	(0)
2021–2022	Camacha	14	(0)
2022	Académica	12	(0)
2022	Cruzado Canicense	7	(1)
Total		326	(15)

International career
2009	Portugal U21	4	(0)
- * Club domestic league appearances and goals

João Diogo Gomes de Freitas (born 28 February 1988), known as João Diogo, is a Portuguese former professional footballer who played as a right-back.

== Club career ==
=== Marítimo ===
Born in Funchal, João Diogo joined local Marítimo's youth system in 1996, at the age of 8. He spent the better part of his first four seasons as a senior with the reserves, in the third division.

João Diogo made his Primeira Liga debut with the Madeirans on 13 January 2012, playing the full 90 minutes in a 1–1 away draw against Paços de Ferreira. It would be the first of just two league appearances during the campaign, the other also coming against the same opponent.

From 2013–14 onwards, João Diogo became Marítimo's first choice in his position. In 2015 and 2016, he started and scored in Taça da Liga finals against Benfica, but lost both games held in Coimbra (2–1 and 6–2, respectively).

=== Belenenses ===
On 25 May 2016, João Diogo signed for Belenenses. He scored twice from 31 appearances in his first season, helping to a 14th-place finish.

João Diogo spent the first part of the following campaign on the sidelines, nursing an injury. In late December 2017, he terminated his contract.

=== Romania ===
In January 2018, João Diogo joined Gaz Metan Mediaș of the Romanian Liga I. On 7 February of the following year he signed with Farul Constanța in the same country (Liga II), owned by former Romanian international Ciprian Marica.

== International career ==
João Diogo represented Portugal at under-21 level, appearing for the nation at the 2009 Lusofonia Games.
