= André Rateira =

Portuguese footballer

André Filipe Bessa Leal (born 24 August 1988 in Paços de Ferreira) known as André Rateira, is a Portuguese footballer who plays for C.D. Trofense as a forward.

== Football career ==
On 29 July 2012, Rateira made his professional debut with Trofense in a 2012–13 Taça da Liga match against Aves.
