= José Viterbo =

Portuguese football manager

Personal information
- Full name: José Eduardo Dias Borges Viterbo Correia
- Date of birth: 23 March 1962 (age 64)
- Place of birth: Coimbra, Portugal

Team information
- Current team: Académica (coach)

Managerial career
- Years: Team
- 2001–2002: Académica (U-19)
- 2002–2003: Académica B
- 2003: Fátima
- 2004: Pampilhosa
- 2004–2007: Sourense
- 2007: Valonguense
- 2008: Sanjoanense
- 2008–2011: Tocha
- 2011–2014: Eirense
- 2014: Académica (U-23)
- 2015: Académica

José Eduardo Dias Borges Viterbo Correia (born 23 March 1962), known as José Viterbo, is a Portuguese football manager who last managed Académica.

== Coaching career ==
=== Académica ===
Viterbo started the 2014–15 season in charge of Académica's under-23 side. On 15 February 2015, however, following Paulo Sérgio resignation, he was named caretaker manager of the first team. He made his debut as Académica coach against Estoril at Estádio António Coimbra da Mota on 22 February 2015, in a 1–2 away win for the league.

A few days later, Luís Godinho, the vice-president of Académica, stated in an interview given to MaisFutebol that they are not looking for a manager.

After losing the first five games of the 2015–16 season, he resigned on 20 September 2015.
