= Moedas =

Portuguese footballer

Personal information
- Full name: Hugo Filipe Santos Guedes
- Date of birth: 25 October 1993 (age 33)
- Place of birth: Matosinhos, Portugal
- Height: 1.83 m (6 ft 0 in)
- Position: Midfielder

Team information
- Current team: Folgosa Maia

Youth career
- 2003–2012: Leixões

Senior career*
Years	Team	Apps	(Gls)
2012–2015	Leixões	76	(3)
2015–2016	Oliveirense	13	(0)
2016	Estarreja	7	(0)
2016	Águeda	4	(0)
2017	Pedrouços	17	(1)
2017	Maia	8	(0)
2018–	Folgosa Maia	12	(1)

International career
2013	Portugal U20	4	(1)
- * Club domestic league appearances and goals as of 29 April 2018

Hugo Filipe Santos Guedes (born 25 October 1993), known as Moedas, is a Portuguese footballer who plays for Folgosa Maia Futebol Clube as a midfielder.

== Club career ==
Born in Matosinhos, Moedas joined local Leixões SC's youth system in 2003. He made his professional debut in the 2012–13 season, with the club in the second division.

In the 2014–15 campaign, Moedas scored four goals all competitions comprised, all coming through penalty kicks and three being in the league. In the summer of 2015, after 12 years at the Estádio do Mar, he signed with fellow league team U.D. Oliveirense.
