= Joel Silva (footballer, born 1990) =

Portuguese footballer

Personal information
- Full name: Pedro Joel Pereira da Silva
- Date of birth: 24 October 1990 (age 36)
- Place of birth: Barcelos, Portugal
- Height: 1.80 m (5 ft 11 in)
- Position: Forward

Team information
- Current team: Salgueiros
- Number: 28

Youth career
- 2001–2009: Santa Maria

Senior career*
Years	Team	Apps	(Gls)
2009–2012	Santa Maria	55	(7)
2012–2014	Freamunde	55	(18)
2014–2015	Tondela	30	(4)
2015–2016	Aves	13	(0)
2016–2017	Vilaverdense	16	(10)
2017	Santa Clara	12	(1)
2017–2018	Vilaverdense	28	(7)
2018–2019	Fafe	33	(18)
2019	Lusitanos Saint-Maur	2	(0)
2020	Alverca	7	(1)
2020–2022	Lusitânia	50	(17)
2022–2023	Sanjoanense	25	(9)
2023–2024	Fafe	24	(4)
2024–2025	Paredes	11	(5)
2025	AD Marco 09	19	(6)
2025–2026	Vianense	25	(16)
2026–	Salgueiros	2	(1)
- * Club domestic league appearances and goals as of 13 September 2026

Pedro Joel Pereira da Silva (born 24 October 1990) is a Portuguese professional footballer who plays for Campeonato de Portugal club Salgueiros as a forward.

== Club career ==
Born in Barcelos, Joel joined local Santa Maria FC's youth system in 2001, aged 11. He went on to spend three full seasons with the first team, in amateur football.

Joel made his professional debut in the 2012–13 campaign, scoring one goal in 23 Segunda Liga matches for S.C. Freamunde and eventually suffering relegation. He added 17 the following campaign, helping the club achieve immediate promotion.

On 14 June 2014, Joel signed a two-year contract with C.D. Tondela. He contributed 14 starting appearances in his debut season, to help his team reach the Primeira Liga for the first time in their history.
