= Fábio Zola =

Portuguese footballer

Personal information
- Full name: Fábio Oliveira Valente
- Date of birth: 10 February 1992 (age 34)
- Place of birth: Oliveira de Azeméis, Portugal
- Height: 1.75 m (5 ft 9 in)
- Position: Forward

Team information
- Current team: Bragança
- Number: 17

Youth career
- 2005–2010: Cesarense

Senior career*
Years	Team	Apps	(Gls)
2009–2013	Cesarense	36	(3)
2013–2016	Leixões	15	(1)
2014–2015	→ Lusitânia Lourosa (loan)	29	(6)
2016	→ Lusitânia Lourosa (loan)	18	(3)
2016–	Bragança	22	(4)
- * Club domestic league appearances and goals as of 2 April 2017

Fábio Oliveira Valente, known as Fábio Zola (born 10 February 1992) is a Portuguese footballer who plays for Bragança as a forward.

== Career ==
On 4 August 2013, Fábio Zola made his professional debut with Leixões in a 2013–14 Taça da Liga match against Atlético.
