= Rui Quinta =

Portuguese footballer and manager

Personal information
- Full name: Rui Manuel Pinto Reis Quinta
- Date of birth: 6 June 1960 (age 66)
- Place of birth: Barcelos, Portugal
- Position: Midfielder

Team information
- Current team: Chungbuk Cheongju (manager)

Senior career*
Years	Team	Apps	(Gls)
1980–1981	Rebordosa	2	(1)
1982–1984	Paredes	60	(17)
1984–1985	Paivense	19	(12)
1985–1996	Paços Ferreira	189	(49)
1986–1987	Valonguense	5	(6)
1987–1991	Paredes	105	(23)

Managerial career
- 2004–2007: Paredes
- 2007: Aliados Lordelo
- 2008–2009: Penafiel
- 2009–2010: Gil Vicente
- 2014–2015: Penafiel
- 2017: Vizela
- 2017–2019: Espinho
- 2019–2020: Lusitânia Lourosa
- 2021–2022: Salgueiros
- 2026–: Chungbuk Cheongju
- * Club domestic league appearances and goals

Rui Manuel Pinto dos Reis da Quinta (born 6 June 1960), known simply as Rui Quinta, is a Portuguese football manager and former player. He is the current head coach of K League 2 club Chungbuk Cheongju.

== Career ==
In July 2008, after several seasons working as a part of a backroom staff as well as for several lower level sides, Quinta accepted an invitation to manage Portuguese Second Division side F.C. Penafiel. At the helm of the Penafidelenses, he guided them to promotion to the Segunda Liga.

Immediately afterwards, Quinta left for Gil Vicente FC. He resigned on 28 February 2010.

On 13 June 2011, Quinta was appointed as the new manager of Varzim SC. A month into his spell, he left to take up an assistant manager role at FC Porto alongside Vítor Pereira. The club claimed back-to-back league titles.

Quinta left the Dragões at the end of the 2012–13 season, following Pereira. After a one-year absence, he returned to manage his former side Penafiel for a second spell in September 2014, this time in the Primeira Liga. He left on 17 March 2015 after a 2–0 home loss to Rio Ave F.C. left the club in last place with 16 points.

On 24 December 2016, Quinta returned to management at F.C. Vizela until the end of the season, after Ricardo Soares left for G.D. Chaves. He left the following 14 March, having won twice in 11 matches and with the team in the relegation places.

Quinta resumed his career at S.C. Espinho of the third tier on 27 June 2017. In his second season, the team won their group, but were eliminated on penalties in the quarter-finals of the promotion play-offs by eventual champions Casa Pia AC. He remained in the division and the Aveiro District, taking over at Lusitânia F.C. on 10 June 2019.

Quinta left Lusitânia by mutual consent on 9 November 2020, after four games of the new season. The following 21 January, he was hired at S.C. Salgueiros. In 2023, he reunited with Vítor Pereira, acting as his assistant during his tenure with Brazilian Série A club Flamengo.

On 30 December 2025, Quinta was appointed as manager of K League 2 club Chungbuk Cheongju.
