= Mamadou Djikiné =

Malian footballer (born 1987)

Personal information
- Date of birth: 16 May 1987 (age 39)
- Place of birth: Bamako, Mali
- Height: 1.88 m (6 ft 2 in)
- Position: Defensive midfielder

Youth career
- Centre Salif Keita

Senior career*
Years	Team	Apps	(Gls)
2007–2009	Covilhã	37	(1)
2009–2012	Vitória Setúbal	34	(1)
2012–2013	Olympiakos Nicosia	18	(0)
2014–2015	Covilhã	28	(2)
2015–2016	Atlético	35	(1)
2016–2018	Covilhã	45	(0)
2018–2019	Jeunesse Canach		
Total		197	(5)
- * Club domestic league appearances and goals

Mamadou Djikiné (born 16 May 1987) is a Malian former professional footballer who played as a defensive midfielder.

== Club career ==
Born in Bamako, Djikiné spent all but his entire professional career in Portugal. In 2007 he signed with third division club S.C. Covilhã, playing 20 matches in his first season to help them promote as group champions and overall runners-up.

Djikiné made his debut in the Segunda Liga on 31 August 2008, featuring 90 minutes in the 4–3 home win against S.C. Olhanense. He scored his first goal in the competition the following 19 April, but also put one past his own net in a 1–1 away draw with Gil Vicente FC.

In the 2009 off-season, Djikiné joined Vitória de Setúbal. His maiden appearance in the Primeira Liga occurred on 17 August, when he played the entire 0–0 draw against Vitória de Guimarães at the Estádio do Bonfim. It was one of 25 during the campaign to help his team finally avoid relegation as third-bottom.

Djikiné returned to Covilhã and the Portuguese second division in June 2014, following a spell in the Cypriot First Division. On 25 January 2015, he suffered a serious head injury after colliding with a teammate during a league fixture against Portimonense SC; he made a full recovery, going on to help the side as they fought for promotion until the end of the season, eventually finishing fourth level on points with the vice-champions.

Ahead of 2015–16, Djikiné agreed to a two-year contract at Atlético Clube de Portugal also of the second tier. On 10 August 2016, however, he returned to his previous club on a one-year deal.
