= João Mendes (footballer, born 1988) =

Portuguese footballer

Personal information
- Full name: João Pedro Moreira Mendes
- Date of birth: 22 March 1988 (age 38)
- Place of birth: Ermesinde, Portugal
- Height: 1.72 m (5 ft 8 in)
- Position: Forward

Youth career
- 2000–2005: Ermesinde
- 2005–2007: Braga

Senior career*
Years	Team	Apps	(Gls)
2005–2010	Braga B	1	(0)
2007–2008	→ Merelinense (loan)	27	(2)
2008–2009	→ Ribeirão (loan)	31	(4)
2009–2010	→ Varzim (loan)	28	(2)
2010–2014	Rio Ave	19	(0)
2012–2013	→ Portimonense (loan)	26	(1)
2013–2014	→ Ribeirão (loan)	34	(11)
2014–2015	Leixões	41	(3)
2015–2019	Famalicão	108	(8)
2019	Lusitânia	17	(3)
2019–2020	Vizela	19	(2)
Total		351	(36)

International career
2007	Portugal U19	2	(0)
- * Club domestic league appearances and goals

João Pedro Moreira Mendes (born 22 March 1988 in Ermesinde, Porto District) is a Portuguese former professional footballer who played as a forward.
