= Jonas (footballer, born 1984) =

Brazilian footballer

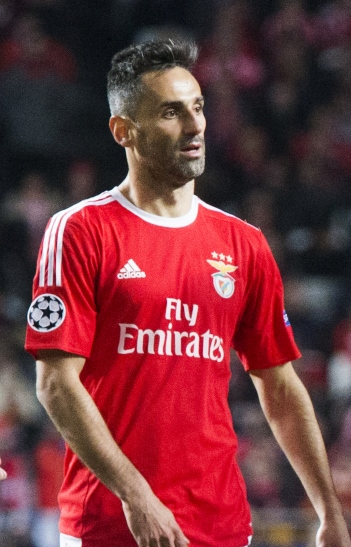
- Jonas with Benfica in 2016

Personal information
- Full name: Jonas Gonçalves Oliveira
- Date of birth: 1 April 1984 (age 42)
- Place of birth: Bebedouro, São Paulo, Brazil
- Height: 1.81 m (5 ft 11 in)
- Position: Forward

Youth career
- 2000–2004: Guarani

Senior career*
| Years | Team | Apps | (Gls) |
| 2005-2006 | Guarani | 28 | (13) |
| 2006–2007 | Santos | 46 | (9) |
| 2007–2011 | Grêmio | 115 | (65) |
| 2008–2009 | → Portuguesa (loan) | 25 | (10) |
| 2011–2014 | Valencia | 113 | (36) |
| 2014–2019 | Benfica | 132 | (110) |
| Total | | 459 | (243) |

International career
| 2011–2016 | Brazil | 12 | (3) |
- * Club domestic league appearances and goals

Jonas Gonçalves Oliveira (born 1 April 1984), known as Jonas (Brazilian Portuguese: [ˈʒõnɐs]), is a Brazilian former professional footballer who played as a forward. A Brazilian international on twelve occasions, he could also play as an attacking midfielder.

Jonas started his career in Brazil with Guarani, later joining Santos, Grêmio (Bola de Prata in 2010) and Portuguesa before moving to Spanish side Valencia in 2011. Three years later, he joined Benfica in Portugal, playing there for five seasons and earning several individual awards, most notably Primeira Liga Player of the Year (2015, 2016) and Bola de Prata (2016, 2018). Moreover, he won four Primeira Liga titles, one Taça de Portugal, two Taça da Liga, and two Supertaça Cândido de Oliveira.

== Club career ==
=== Guarani ===
Jonas began his senior career at Guarani in 2005. He made his debut against Santo André. While playing for Guarani, Jonas scored 13 goals, 12 of them in 25 league matches.

=== Santos ===
In 2006, Jonas transferred to Santos, where he won the 2006 Campeonato Paulista, scoring five goals in six matches. However, he had a serious knee injury that kept him out of action for six months. In 2007, he returned to the pitch and scored four goals in the Paulista, helping Santos win the tournament for the second time in a row. After spending only one year at Santos, Jonas transferred to Grêmio in 2007.

=== Grêmio ===
On 12 September 2007, Grêmio signed a four-year deal which transferred 50% of Jonas' rights. He made his debut in the Gre–Nal derby, leaving injured early in the second half.

After more forwards arrived in 2008, Jonas lost his place, sometimes even failing to make the reserves list. The most consistent criticism from the press was his lack of physical strength when playing up front against powerful defenders. By July, he decided to leave the club.

=== Portuguesa (loan) ===
Despite not being able to avoid relegation to the Série B in 2008, Jonas was one of the best players in the team, scoring 18 goals during his stay, nine in the Campeonato Brasileiro, ahead of teammate Edno's eight.

=== Return to Grêmio ===
After the loan ended, Jonas returned to Grêmio for the 2009 season. He played in the 2009 Copa Libertadores, and after playing his worst game in the tournament (incredibly missing three chances to score in the same attack) against Boyacá Chicó, he was dubbed "the worst forward in the world" ("el peor delantero del mundo") by the Spanish newspaper Mundo Deportivo.

Jonas, however, scored 14 goals in the 2009 Campeonato Brasileiro Série A and was among the top goal scorers. He enjoyed further success throughout the 2010 season: he was the top-scorer for Grêmio in the 2010 Campeonato Gaúcho and finished as the top scorer in Série A with 23 goals.

=== Valencia ===
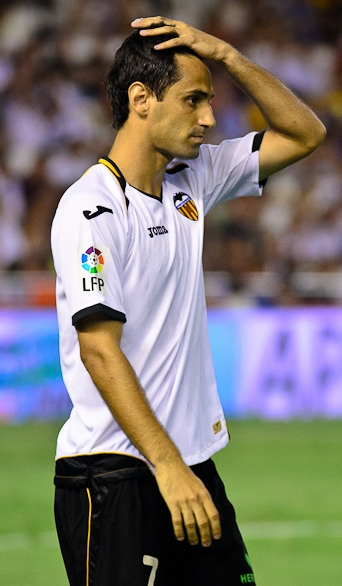
Jonas with Valencia in 2011

Due to a low release fee (€1.25 million), Jonas rescinded his contract with Grêmio, where he was finally transferred to Spanish club Valencia on 24 January 2011. His first goal for Los Che came on 27 February, scoring a late winner in a 2–1 away victory for Valencia against Athletic Bilbao. He scored his second goal in a match against Real Madrid on 24 April, which ended 3–6.

On 1 November 2011, Jonas scored the second fastest goal in UEFA Champions League history by netting inside 10.5 seconds to give Valencia a 1–0 lead over Bayer Leverkusen. He fell just short of former Bayern Munich and Netherlands national team striker Roy Makaay's record of 10.13 seconds that he set against Real Madrid in the 2006–07 edition of the tournament. Valencia won the match 3–1.

Jonas scored both goals for Valencia in a 2–0 Champions League win against Lille on 2 October 2012. In the 2012–13 La Liga, he scored a personal-season high of 13 goals for Valencia. On 1 December 2013, Jonas hit an eight-minute hat-trick as Valencia defeated ten-man Osasuna in a home league match. On 1 September 2014, he rescinded his link with the club.

=== Benfica ===
==== 2014–15 season ====
On 12 September 2014, Jonas signed for Portuguese Primeira Liga champions Benfica on a two-year deal. On 5 October, he debuted for the club in a 4–0 win against Arouca, scoring his side's fourth goal. On 18 October, he scored a hat-trick as Benfica defeated Covilhã 2–3 in the third round of Taça de Portugal. On 22 November, he scored twice against Moreirense (4–1) in the Portuguese Cup. On 30 December, he scored the only goal in a home win against Nacional in the third round of the Taça da Liga, thus scoring in every domestic competition.

On 21 January 2015, Jonas scored for Moreirense in the league cup and became the Brazilian with the best average number of goals in Europe (0.81), surpassing Neymar (0.74) and Luiz Adriano (0.70), with 13 goals in 16 matches. On 28 February, Jonas scored twice in the thrashing of Estoril (6–0) in the league. On 14 March, Jonas scored his 20th goal for Benfica (in 25 matches) and set his season goal record in Europe, as Benfica beat Braga (2–0) in the Primeira Liga. On 4 April, he scored two goals against Nacional in the league. On 11 April, he scored twice against Académica de Coimbra (5–1) in the league. On 18 April, he scored twice in a third consecutive league match, in a win at Belenenses (0–2), and became the second best top scorer in Primeira Liga with 16 goals in 22 matches.

On 23 May 2015, after winning the league title, Jonas netted two goals in a home win against Marítimo (4–1) in his last league match of the season, in which he could have become the league's top scorer with 21 goals, but one of his three goals was wrongly invalidated for offside. On 29 May, he scored the first goal in a 2–1 win against Marítimo in the Taça da Liga final, being named man of the match. In this season, he was the top scorer in the league cup with five goals, and in the Taça de Portugal with six goals. On 4 July, he won the league's Player of the Year award.

==== 2015–16 season ====
In the 2015–16 season, Jonas scored a hat-trick in a 4–1 win at Nacional, increasing his tally to 18 goals in 17 league matches. On 5 February 2016, he scored twice in a league victory at Belenenses (0–5). On 16 February, he scored a last-minute goal with a header in the 91st minute to give Benfica a home win against Zenit Saint Petersburg (1–0) in the first leg of the UEFA Champions League's round of 16. On 29 February, Jonas netted two goals against União da Madeira (2–0) in the Primeira Liga and equalised Óscar Cardozo's scoring record at Benfica in the 2009–10 season.

On 14 March 2016, Jonas scored twice against Tondela in a 4–1 home league win and became Benfica's top scorer of the 21st century with 30 goals. Six days later, he scored the winning goal at Boavista (0–1) in the 93rd minute. On 15 May, he scored his 32nd league goal, in a home win against Nacional (4–1) on the final day, and received the Bola de Prata award during the league title celebration. Throughout the season, he was a candidate to win the European Golden Shoe and even lead the race, but ultimately finished fourth. On 15 July, Jonas was awarded the Top Goalscorer and the Best Player awards in Primeira Liga for the 2015–16 season.

==== 2016–17 season ====
Jonas opened the 2016–17 season with a goal in the 3–0 win over Braga for the 2016 Supertaça Cândido de Oliveira. Days later, he required surgery for osteophytes, which ended up ruling him out until late December.

Despite not opening his account for the league season until the 16th matchday in a 2–0 win at Vitória de Guimarães, Jonas finished the campaign with 13 goals from 19 games, making him the league's fifth-highest scorer of the season and Benfica's second. On 1 April 2017, he scored his first goal against another member of the Big Three in a 1–1 home draw with Porto, and in doing so reached 65 league goals for Benfica – leapfrogging the Swede Mats Magnusson as the club's highest foreign goalscorer in the competition, behind Paraguay's Óscar Cardozo (112).

==== 2017–18 season ====
In the 2017 Supertaça Cândido de Oliveira against Vitória de Guimarães at the Estádio Municipal de Aveiro, Jonas opened the scoring after six minutes of a 3–1 win for Benfica. He scored five times in the four league matches of August 2017, including a hat-trick in a 5–0 win over neighbours Belenenses on 19 August. On 26 November, he scored twice in a 6–0 home win over Vitória de Setúbal to pass 100 goals for Benfica, and also became only their second player after Julinho (1949–50) to net in ten consecutive league fixtures. He picked up the league's Player of the Month award five months running from October/November 2017 to March 2018.

On 3 March 2018, Jonas scored a hat-trick in a 5–0 home win over Marítimo. He ended the season with 34 goals from 30 games in the league, finishing as top scorer for the second time, seven goals ahead of Sporting's Bas Dost; Benfica missed out on the league title to Porto, and Jonas missed several games towards the end of the season.

==== 2018–19 season ====
On 3 November 2018, Jonas reached 100 Primeira Liga goals for Benfica, in the second minute of a home game against Moreirense that ended in a shock 3–1 loss. Following his return from injury in the 2018–19 season, Jonas scored twice to seal a 10–0 home thrashing of Nacional in the league on 11 February 2019. On 9 July 2019, he announced his retirement.

== International career ==
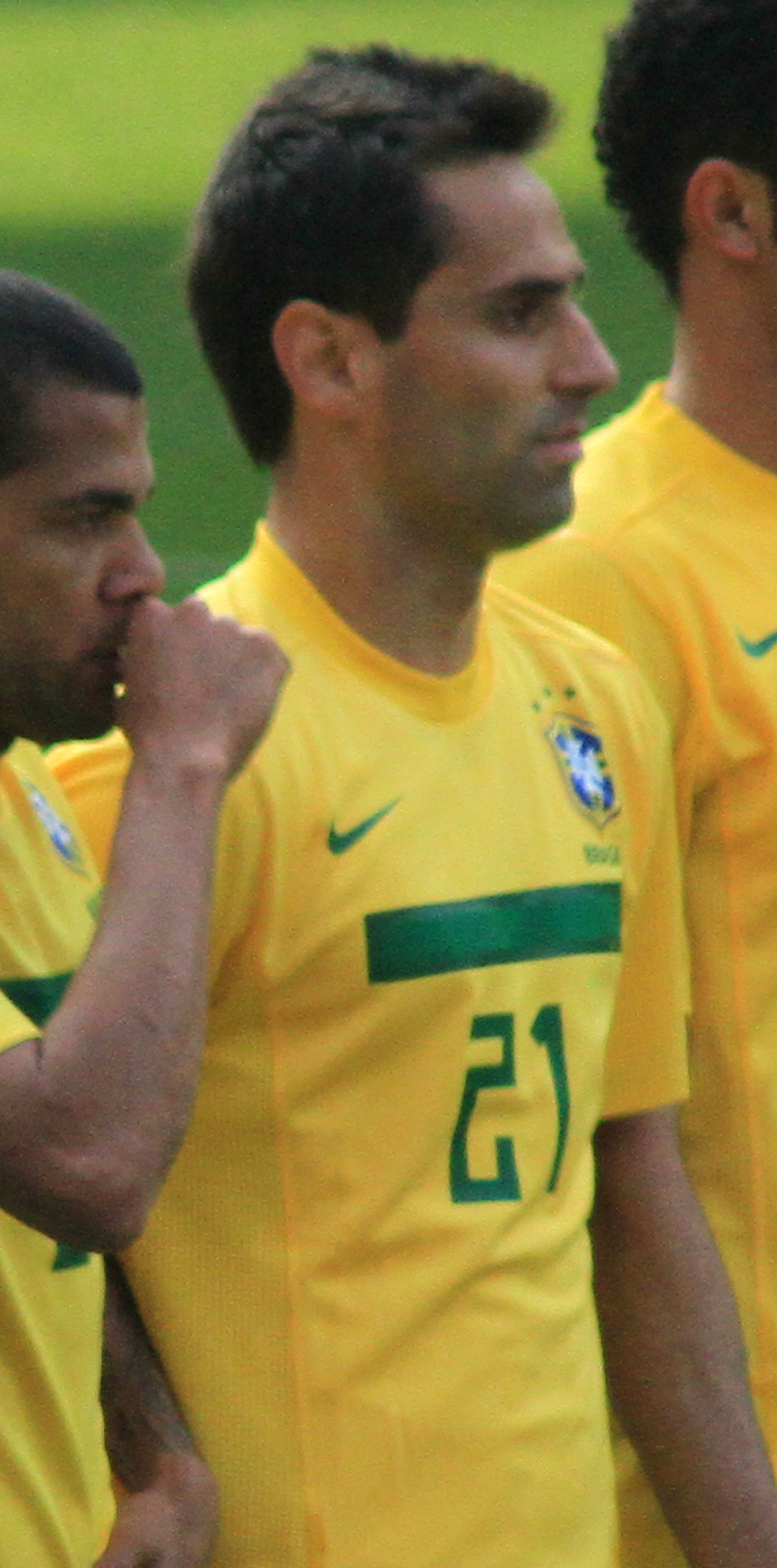
Jonas with Brazil in 2011

Jonas was called up for the Brazil national team for the first time and made his debut in a friendly against Scotland at the Emirates Stadium on 27 March 2011. He came on as a substitute for Leandro Damião in the 78th minute, and Brazil went on to win the match 2–0.

Jonas scored his first goals with the Seleção in a friendly against Egypt on 14 November 2011, netting a brace in a 2–0 victory.

On 30 March 2016, Jonas earned his ninth cap for Brazil – the first since 11 September 2012. He replaced Ricardo Oliveira in the 80th minute of the match against Paraguay that ended in a 2–2 draw, during the 2018 FIFA World Cup qualification.

On 20 May, Jonas was called up to replace injured Ricardo Oliveira in Brazil's Copa América Centenario squad.

== Personal life ==
Jonas was born in the city of Bebedouro and was raised in Taiúva, a neighbour municipality in the state of São Paulo. He was born to teachers Ismael (father) and Maria Luiza (mother). He has two older brothers, Tiago and Diego.

In August 2015, Jonas gained Italian citizenship.

== Career statistics ==
=== Club ===
Appearances and goals by club, season and competition
| Club | Season | League | | | State league | | National cup (Note: Includes Copa do Brasil, Copa del Rey, Taça de Portugal) | | League cup (Note: Includes Taça da Liga) | | Continental | | Other | | Total | |
| Club | Season | Division | Apps | Goals | Apps | Goals | Apps | Goals | Apps | Goals | Apps | Goals | Apps | Goals | Apps | Goals |
|---|---|---|---|---|---|---|---|---|---|---|---|---|---|---|---|---|
| Guarani | 2005 | Série B | 25 | 12 | 3 | 1 | 1 | 0 | — | | — | | — | | 29 | 13 |
| Santos | 2006 | Série A | 15 | 1 | 6 | 4 | 0 | 0 | — | | 4 (Note: Appearances in Copa Sudamericana) | 0 | — | | 25 | 5 |
| Santos | 2007 | Série A | 5 | 0 | 20 | 4 | 0 | 0 | — | | 8 (Note: Appearances in Copa Libertadores) | 1 | — | | 33 | 5 |
| Santos | Total | | 20 | 1 | 26 | 8 | 0 | 0 | — | | 12 | 1 | — | | 58 | 10 |
| Grêmio | 2007 | Série A | 12 | 3 | — | | — | | — | | — | | — | | 12 | 3 |
| Grêmio | 2008 | Série A | 3 | 0 | 3 | 3 | 0 | 0 | — | | — | | — | | 6 | 3 |
| Grêmio | 2009 | Série A | 26 | 14 | 15 | 8 | — | | — | | 8 | 2 | — | | 49 | 24 |
| Grêmio | 2010 | Série A | 33 | 23 | 21 | 11 | 9 | 8 | — | | 2 | 0 | — | | 65 | 42 |
| Grêmio | 2011 | Série A | 0 | 0 | 2 | 3 | — | | — | | 0 | 0 | — | | 2 | 3 |
| Grêmio | Total | | 74 | 40 | 41 | 25 | 9 | 8 | — | | 10 | 2 | — | | 134 | 76 |
| Portuguesa (loan) | 2008 | Série A | 25 | 10 | — | | — | | — | | — | | — | | 25 | 10 |
| Valencia | 2010–11 | La Liga | 13 | 3 | — | | 0 | 0 | — | | 1 (Note: Appearance(s) in UEFA Champions League) | 0 | — | | 14 | 3 |
| Valencia | 2011–12 | La Liga | 34 | 10 | — | | 7 | 4 | — | | 13 (Note: Five appearances and three goals in UEFA Champions League, eight appearances and two goals in UEFA Europa League) | 5 | — | | 54 | 19 |
| Valencia | 2012–13 | La Liga | 35 | 13 | — | | 6 | 1 | — | | 8 | 5 | — | | 49 | 19 |
| Valencia | 2013–14 | La Liga | 31 | 10 | — | | 1 | 0 | — | | 8 (Note: Appearances in UEFA Europa League) | 0 | — | | 40 | 10 |
| Valencia | Total | | 113 | 36 | — | | 14 | 5 | — | | 30 | 10 | — | | 157 | 51 |
| Benfica | 2014–15 | Primeira Liga | 27 | 20 | — | | 3 | 6 | 5 | 5 | — | | — | | 35 | 31 |
| Benfica | 2015–16 | Primeira Liga | 34 | 32 | — | | 1 | 0 | 3 | 2 | 9 | 2 | 1 (Note: Appearance in Supertaça Cândido de Oliveira) | 0 | 48 | 36 |
| Benfica | 2016–17 | Primeira Liga | 19 | 13 | — | | 3 | 2 | 4 | 2 | 1 | 0 | 1 | 1 | 28 | 18 |
| Benfica | 2017–18 | Primeira Liga | 30 | 34 | — | | 2 | 1 | 2 | 1 | 6 | 0 | 1 | 1 | 41 | 37 |
| Benfica | 2018–19 | Primeira Liga | 22 | 11 | — | | 3 | 2 | 1 | 0 | 5 (Note: Two appearances and one goal in UEFA Champions League, three appearances and one goal in UEFA Europa League) | 2 | — | | 31 | 15 |
| Benfica | Total | | 132 | 110 | — | | 12 | 11 | 15 | 10 | 21 | 4 | 3 | 2 | 183 | 137 |
| Career total | | | 389 | 209 | 70 | 34 | 36 | 24 | 15 | 10 | 73 | 17 | 3 | 2 | 586 | 297 |

=== International ===
Appearances and goals by national team and year
| National team | Year | Apps | Goals |
|---|---|---|---|
| Brazil | 2011 | 5 | 2 |
| Brazil | 2012 | 3 | 0 |
| Brazil | 2013 | 0 | 0 |
| Brazil | 2014 | 0 | 0 |
| Brazil | 2015 | 0 | 0 |
| Brazil | 2016 | 4 | 1 |
| Total | | 12 | 3 |

Scores and results list Brazil's goal tally first, score column indicates score after each Jonas goal.

List of international goals scored by Jonas
| No. | Date | Venue | Opponent | Score | Result | Competition |
|---|---|---|---|---|---|---|
| 1 | 14 November 2011 | Ahmed bin Ali Stadium, Al Rayyan, Qatar | Egypt | 1–0 | 2–0 | Friendly |
| 2 | 14 November 2011 | Ahmed bin Ali Stadium, Al Rayyan, Qatar | Egypt | 2–0 | 2–0 | Friendly |
| 3 | 29 May 2016 | Dick's Sporting Goods Park, Commerce City, United States | Panama | 1–0 | 2–0 | Friendly |

== Honours ==
Grêmio

- Campeonato Gaúcho: 2010

Santos

- Campeonato Paulista: 2006, 2007

Benfica

- Primeira Liga: 2014–15, 2015–16, 2016–17, 2018–19
- Taça de Portugal: 2016–17
- Taça da Liga: 2014–15, 2015–16
- Supertaça Cândido de Oliveira: 2016, 2017

Individual

- Campeonato Brasileiro Série A Team of the Year: 2010
- Bola de Prata: 2010
- Arthur Friedenreich Award: 2010
- Cosme Damião Awards – Footballer of the Year: 2015, 2016, 2017, 2018
- SJPF Player of the Month: February 2015, April 2015, January 2016, February 2016 March 2016, December 2017, January 2018, February 2018, March 2018
- UEFA's Player of the Year in Portugal: 2014–15
- LPFP Primeira Liga Player of the Year: 2014–15, 2015–16
- CNID Awards – Footballer of the Year: 2016
- Primeira Liga Top scorer: 2015–16, 2017–18
- SJPF Primeira Liga Team of the Year: 2016, 2017
- O Jogo Primeira Liga Team of the Year: 2016
- A Bola's Player of the Year: 2017
