= Estádio Cidade de Coimbra =

Stadium in Coimbra, Portugal

Coordinates: 40°12′12″N 8°24′28″W

- Calhabé
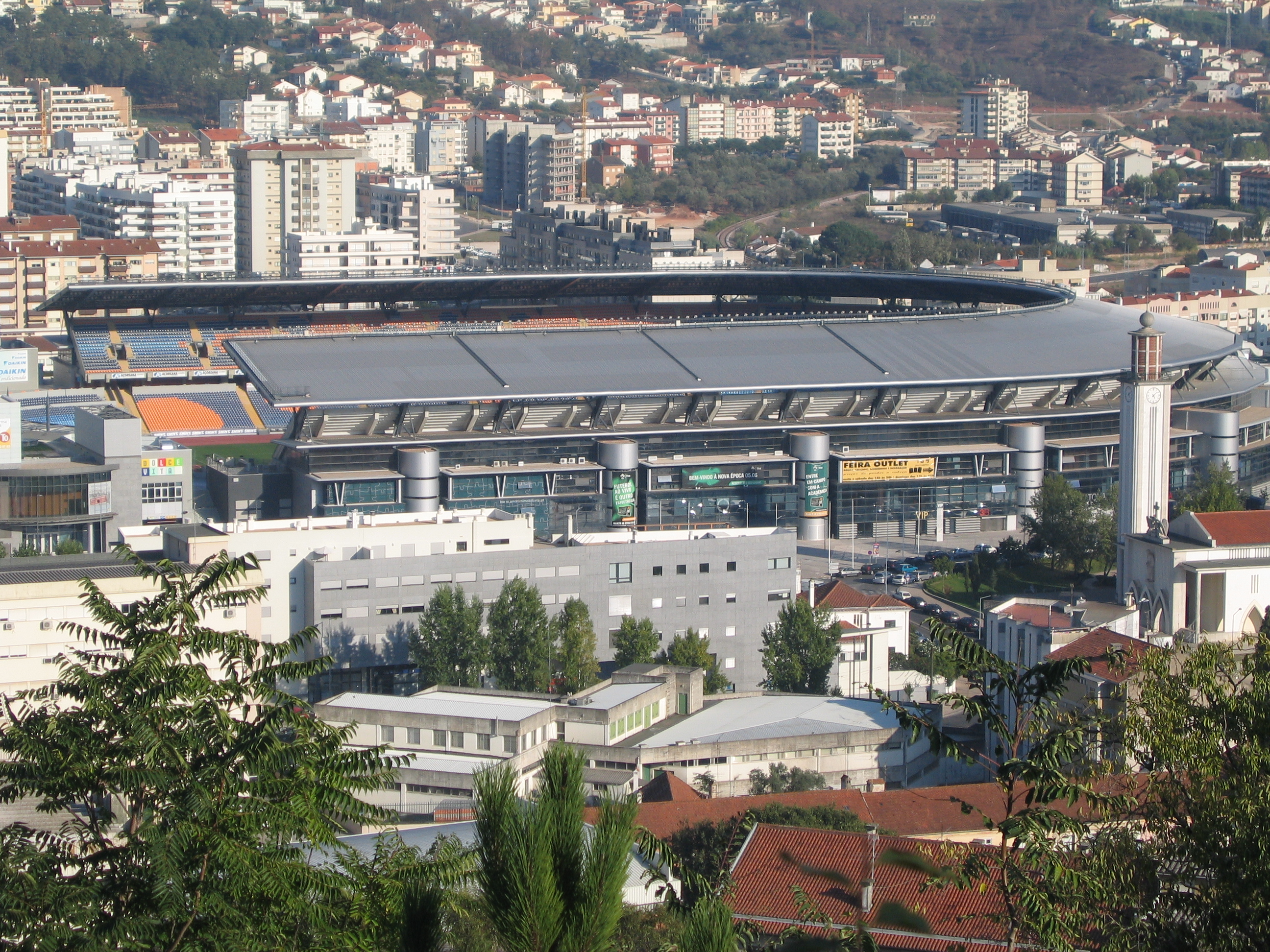
- UEFA
- Interactive map of Estádio Cidade de Coimbra
- Full name: Estádio Municipal "Cidade de Coimbra"
- Former names: Estádio Finibanco Cidade de Coimbra (2006-11); Estádio EFAPEL Cidade de Coimbra
- Location: Coimbra, Portugal
- Owner: Municipality of Coimbra
- Operator: Académica de Coimbra
- Capacity: 29,622; 50,000 for concerts
- Surface: Grass
- Record attendance: 28,878 (20 May 2016); C.S. Marítimo 2–6 S.L. Benfica
- Field size: 105 x 68 m

Construction
- Built: 1949; 77 years ago 2003; 23 years ago
- Opened: 12 September 2003 (ceremonial); 27 September 2003 (official)
- Renovated: 2001–2003
- Expanded: 2003
- Cost: €53.283 million
- Architects: António Monteiro, PLARQ / KSS Design Group Partnership

Tenant
- Académica de Coimbra O.A.F.

The Estádio Cidade de Coimbra (English: Coimbra City Stadium), is a stadium in Coimbra, Portugal. Officially also styled Estádio Municipal "Cidade de Coimbra", it is a municipally-owned stadium belonging to the Municipality of Coimbra, mainly used by the football team of Académica de Coimbra.

The stadium was rebuilt, expanded, and modernized to host some UEFA Euro 2004 matches. Far beyond the sports stadium itself, all the project, called Euro Stadium Project (Projecto Eurostadium), included the possibility of organizing sports, culture, and commercial events, by the modernization of the entire Calhabé area in Coimbra.

The stadium was officially inaugurated with a concert by The Rolling Stones on 27 September 2003, attended by around 50,000 people. The first official match in the remodeled stadium took place on 29 October 2003, with Académica de Coimbra hosting Benfica.

== Features ==
Its design does not involve any historical or traditional references, as the idea was to create a new, contemporary image with glass façades and an aesthetic roof supported by elegant stands. The existing athletics track has been preserved for possible use as a multi-purpose facility in the future. The stadium was designed by the Portuguese architectural firm Plarq in association with KSS Design Group of London. The Plarq team was led by the architect António Monteiro.

The stadium has 29,622 seats, two-thirds of which are covered. The complex boasts a large press centre, a bar, kitchens, and a restaurant with a panoramic view of the pitch. The project of the stadium took advantage of old seats: of close to 15,000 (all seated), involved the planned remodelling of the tier which extends around the entire perimeter of the previous stands, and a second tier above that, in the form of a "U", opening onto the slopes of the city at the North end.

A multi-purpose pavilion, olympic swimming pools, healthclub, gym, offices and studio apartment residences were built in the surrounding area. The Alma Shopping, a shopping and leisure center built near the stadium, includes cinemas, underground car parking, restaurants, and several retail outlets.

== Notable matches ==
=== UEFA Euro 2004 ===
The following UEFA Euro 2004 matches were held in the stadium.

Curiously in both matches, the record for the European Championship's youngest goalscorer was broken, first by Wayne Rooney, then by Johan Vonlanthen.

Date	Team #1	Result	Team #2	Round	Attendance
17 June 2004	England	3–0	Switzerland	Group B	28,214
21 June 2004	Switzerland	1–3	France	Group B	28,111

=== Portugal national football team matches ===
The following national team matches were held in the stadium.

#	Date	Score	Opponent	Competition
1.	13 April 1983	0–0	Hungary	Friendly
2.	8 June 1983	0–4	Brazil	Friendly
3.	9 June 1999	8–0	Liechtenstein	Euro 2000 qualifying
4.	28 April 2004	2–2	Sweden	Friendly
5.	12 November 2005	2–0	Croatia	Friendly
6.	15 November 2006	3–0	Kazakhstan	Euro 2008 qualifying
7.	3 March 2010	2–0	China	Friendly
8.	15 October 2013	3–0	Luxembourg	2014 World Cup qualification

=== Portugal national rugby team matches ===
The following national rugby team matches were held in the stadium:

#	Date	Score	Opponent	Competition
1.	13 November 2021	25–38	Japan	Test match
2.	9 November 2024	17–21	United States	Test match
3.	22 November 2025	33–27	Canada	Test match

=== Taça de Portugal final ===
The stadium also hosted two Taça de Portugal finals in 2020 and 2021. The reasoning for this replacement of the Estádio Nacional was its inability to host the match due to security reasons and lack of guarantee that crowds of spectators would not be able to break the COVID-19 pandemic's cordon sanitaire around the ground, which is surrounded by woodland.

Taça de Portugal finals
Season	Date	Winners	Result	Runners-up	Attendance
2019–20	1 August 2020	Porto	2–1	Benfica	0
2020–21	23 May 2021	Braga	2–0	Benfica	0

=== Taça da Liga final ===
Season	Date	Winners	Score	Runners-up
2010–11	23 April 2011	Benfica	2–1	Paços de Ferreira
2011–12	14 April 2012	Benfica	2–1	Gil Vicente
2012–13	13 April 2013	Braga	1–0	Porto
2014–15	29 May 2015	Benfica	2–1	Marítimo
2015–16	20 May 2016	Benfica	6–2	Marítimo

=== Supertaça Cândido de Oliveira ===
Coimbra was first selected as the stage for three Portuguese Supercup replays (Finalíssimas), the first of which was in 1992, as it was considered a geographically neutral venue between the two sides. In the one-match era it held the 2004 match and most recently the 2026 edition.

Supertaça finals
Season	Date	Winners	Result	Runners-up	Attendance
1992; Finalíssima	9 September 1992	Porto	2–2 (4–3 p.)	SL Benfica	
1994; Finalíssima	17 August 1994	Porto	2–2 (4–3 p.)	SL Benfica	
2000; Finalíssima	16 May 2001	Sporting	1–0	FC Porto	
2004	20 August 2004	Porto	1–0	SL Benfica	22,023
2026	1 August 2026	Porto	1–0	Torreense	26,426

=== Campeonato de Portugal final ===
For the same reasoning as the 2020 and 2021 Portuguese Cup finals, the then third-tier Campeonato de Portugal final was also held in Coimbra in 2020-21.

Campeonato de Portugal final
Season	Date	Winners	Result	Runners-up	Attendance
2020-21	6 June 2021	Trofense	0–0 (1–0 a.e.t.)	Estrela da Amadora	0

== Concerts ==
In addition to football, the stadium is often used for concerts of international artists with capacity up to 50,000 people. In part owing to its geographic position halfway between the two major cities in the country, Lisbon and Porto, it has welcomed some of the largest stars in music since its renovation. Indeed, the stadium's first use was not a sporting event but a Rolling Stones concert on 27 September 2003, to a sold out crowd.

George Michael played there in 2007 during the 25 Live tour, with 39,639 spectators. and in 2010, U2 played two sold-out shows in the stadium during their U2 360° Tour - approximately 109,985 people attended the event. On June 24, 2012, Madonna performed in front of 33,597 people as part of the MDNA Tour. Andrea Bocelli was meant to play on the 4 June 2020, the municipal holiday, but due to the COVID-19 pandemic, it was postponed to June of the following year. To counteract the post-pandemic crowd limitations, there were two concerts on 25 and 26 June.

Coldplay performed at the stadium on 17, 18, 20, & 21 May 2023 as part of their Music of the Spheres World Tour.

Date	Country	Artist	Tour	Opening Act	Attendance	Revenue
27 September 2003	(United Kingdom) UK	The Rolling Stones	Licks Tour	Xutos e Pontapés	50,000	—
12 May 2007	(United Kingdom) UK	George Michael	25 Live	—	39,639	$4,439,568
2 October 2010	(Republic of Ireland) Ireland	U2	U2 360° Tour	Interpol	109,985	$9,925,611
3 October 2010	(Republic of Ireland) Ireland	U2	U2 360° Tour	Interpol	109,985	$9,925,611
24 June 2012	(United States) US	Madonna	The MDNA Tour	Martin Solveig	33,597	$3,156,022
~~4 June 2020~~; 25 June 2021	Italy	Andrea Bocelli	Believe World Tour	Special participation: Mariza		
26 June 2021	Italy	Andrea Bocelli	Believe World Tour	Special participation: Mariza		
25 June 2022	Portugal	Os Quatro e Meia	- (Ao Vivo no Estádio Cidade de Coimbra)	—	17,000	
17 May 2023	(United Kingdom) UK	Coldplay	Music of the Spheres World Tour	Griff; Bárbara Bandeira	208,284 / 208,284	$21,473,885
18 May 2023	(United Kingdom) UK	Coldplay	Music of the Spheres World Tour	Griff; Bárbara Bandeira	208,284 / 208,284	$21,473,885
20 May 2023	(United Kingdom) UK	Coldplay	Music of the Spheres World Tour	Griff; Bárbara Bandeira	208,284 / 208,284	$21,473,885
21 May 2023	(United Kingdom) UK	Coldplay	Music of the Spheres World Tour	Griff; Bárbara Bandeira	208,284 / 208,284	$21,473,885
6 June 2025	(United States) US	Guns N' Roses	Because What You Want & What You Get Are Two Completely Different Things Tour	Rival Sons		
