= Briguel =

Portuguese footballer (born 1979)

Personal information
- Full name: Nuno Miguel Pereira Sousa
- Date of birth: 8 March 1979 (age 47)
- Place of birth: Funchal, Portugal
- Height: 1.74 m (5 ft 9 in)
- Position: Right-back

Youth career
- 1989–1998: Marítimo

Senior career*
Years	Team	Apps	(Gls)
1998–2015	Marítimo B	77	(2)
2000–2016	Marítimo	258	(2)
Total		335	(4)

International career
2001–2002	Portugal U21	5	(0)
- * Club domestic league appearances and goals

Nuno Miguel Pereira Sousa (born 8 March 1979), known as Briguel, is a Portuguese former professional footballer who played as a right-back.

== Club career ==
Born in Funchal, Madeira, Briguel – his nickname derived from former German international defender Hans-Peter Briegel, who also played in his position – spent his entire career in the green and red colours of hometown's C.S. Marítimo. He made his first-team and Primeira Liga debut to kickstart the 2000–01 season, against F.C. Alverca (0–0 away draw, 90 minutes played).

Years after being promoted to the first team, Briguel continued featuring in the odd match for the reserves. He retired at the end of the 2015–16 campaign at the age of 37, after having contributed ten appearances to the former's 13th-place finish. On 17 December 2014, he reached the 700th-game mark with his only club.

Subsequently, Briguel worked as Marítimo's director of football.

== International career ==
Briguel played five times for the Portugal under-21 side, making his debut on 24 October 2001 in a 1–1 friendly with Turkey in Caldas da Rainha.

== See also ==
- List of one-club men
