= G.D. Igreja Nova =

Portuguese football club

- Full name: Grupo Desportivo Igreja Nova
- Founded: 1950
- Ground: Campo Doutor Mário Silveira
- Capacity: 2,500
- Chairman: Domingos Janota
- League: Portuguese Second Division
- 2009–10: 14th place (relegated)

Grupo Desportivo Igreja Nova, commonly known as Igreja Nova, is a Portuguese football club based in Igreja Nova, a parish in the municipality of Mafra. Founded in 1950, the club currently plays in the Terceira Divisão.
