= Ebinho =

Brazilian footballer (born 1988)

Personal information
- Full name: José Edipo Deodato dos Santos
- Date of birth: January 18, 1988 (age 38)
- Place of birth: Paraíba, Brazil
- Height: 1.80 m (5 ft 11 in)
- Position: Forward

Team information
- Current team: Associação Cultural e Desportiva Potiguar

Senior career*
Years	Team	Apps	(Gls)
2013	América	2	(0)
2014	Coríntians	17	(10)
2014	Sergipe	8	(2)
2014	Marítimo	12	(3)
2016–	Associação Cultural e Desportiva Potiguar	0	(0)
- * Club domestic league appearances and goals as of 3 August 2014 ‡ National team caps and goals as of 3 August 2014

José Edipo Deodato dos Santos or Ebinho for short (born 18 January 1988) is a Brazilian professional footballer, who plays as a fast and header forward. He is currently in Associação Cultural e Desportiva Potiguar.

Ebinho joined Portuguese side Marítimo in 2014, but he struggled to adapt to playing as a striker only scoring twice during his first season.
