= Pizzi (Portuguese footballer) =

Portuguese footballer (born 1989)

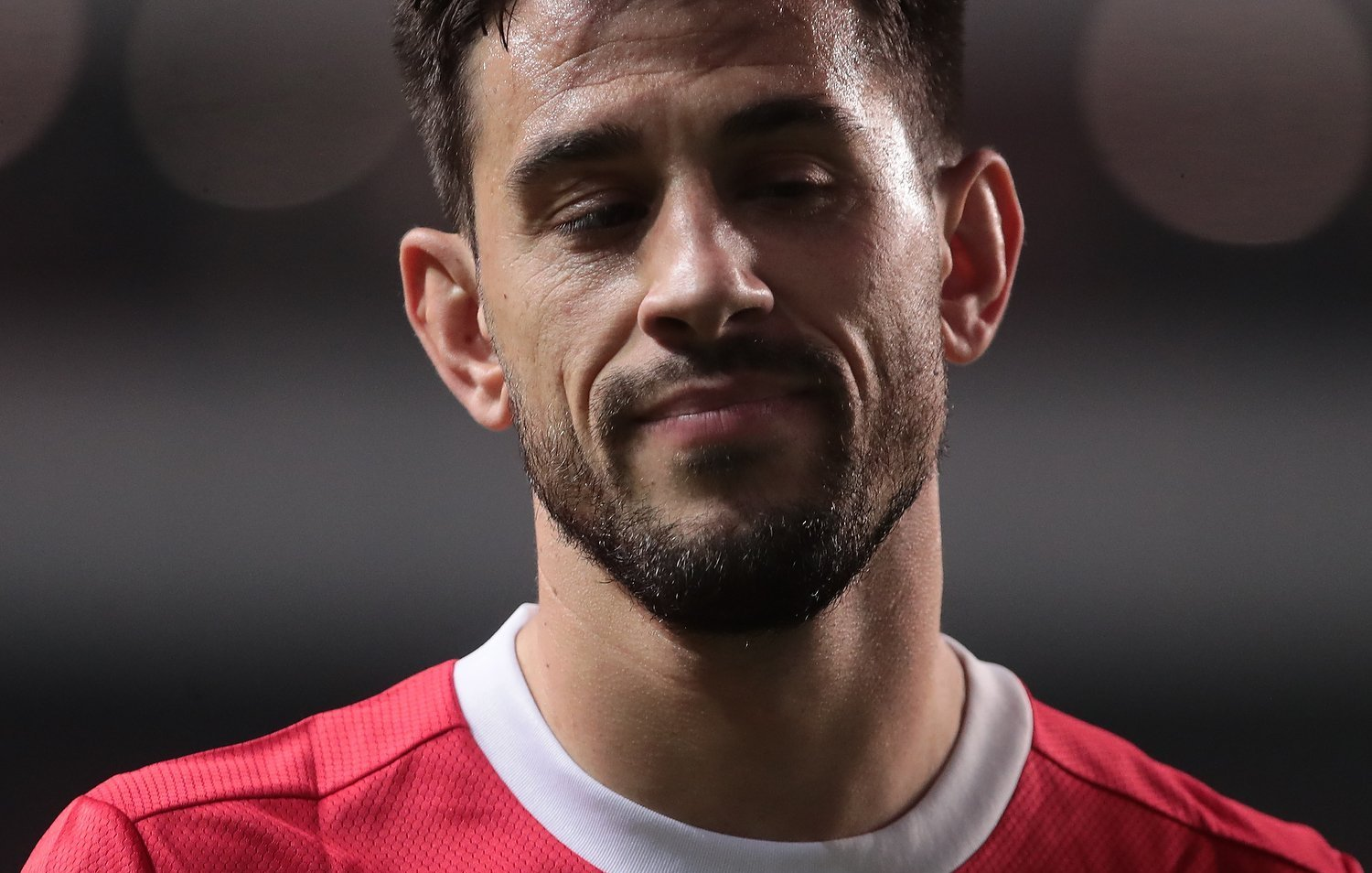
- Pizzi with Benfica in 2019

Personal information
- Full name: Luis Miguel Afonso Fernandes
- Date of birth: 6 October 1989 (age 37)
- Place of birth: Bragança, Portugal
- Height: 1.78 m (5 ft 10 in)
- Positions: Central midfielder; winger

Youth career
- 1999-2000: Mãe d'Água
- 2000–2007: Bragança
- 2007–2008: Braga

Senior career*
| Years | Team | Apps | (Gls) |
| 2007 | Bragança | 4 | (1) |
| 2008–2012 | Braga | 2 | (0) |
| 2008–2009 | → Ribeirão (loan) | 25 | (1) |
| 2009 | → Covilhã (loan) | 14 | (4) |
| 2010–2011 | → Paços de Ferreira (loan) | 42 | (8) |
| 2011–2012 | → Atlético Madrid (loan) | 11 | (1) |
| 2012–2013 | Atlético Madrid | 0 | (0) |
| 2012–2013 | → Deportivo La Coruña (loan) | 35 | (8) |
| 2013–2022 | Benfica | 234 | (64) |
| 2013–2014 | → Espanyol (loan) | 28 | (3) |
| 2022 | → İstanbul Başakşehir (loan) | 10 | (1) |
| 2022 | Al Wahda | 12 | (1) |
| 2023–2024 | Braga | 45 | (3) |
| 2024–2025 | APOEL | 22 | (4) |
| 2025–2026 | Estoril | 23 | (0) |
| Total | | 507 | (99) |

International career
| 2008 | Portugal U19 | 4 | (1) |
| 2010–2011 | Portugal U21 | 2 | (0) |
| 2011 | Portugal U23 | 1 | (0) |
| 2012–2019 | Portugal | 17 | (3) |
Medal record
Representing Portugal
Men's football
FIFA Confederations Cup
| Third place | 2017 Russia |
UEFA Nations League
| Winner | 2019 Portugal |
- * Club domestic league appearances and goals

Luis Miguel Afonso Fernandes (born 6 October 1989), known as Pizzi (Portuguese pronunciation: [ˈpizi]), is a Portuguese former professional footballer who played mainly as a central midfielder.

After a successful loan at Paços de Ferreira, Pizzi spent three years in Spain with as many teams, totalling 74 games and 12 goals in La Liga. He then played eight seasons for Benfica, making 360 appearances, scoring 94 goals, and winning ten domestic honours, including four Primeira Liga titles, three of which were consecutive.

Pizzi made his senior international debut for Portugal in 2012, and was part of their squad at the 2017 FIFA Confederations Cup and 2018–19 UEFA Nations League, winning the latter tournament.

== Club career ==
=== Early years ===
Born in Bragança, Pizzi earned his nickname from playing as a child in a replica Barcelona jersey when Juan Antonio Pizzi was the Spanish club's striker. He began his career with hometown club Bragança in the third tier in 2007. A year later, he joined Primeira Liga club Braga, spending most of his time out on loan and making his first professional appearances with Covilhã of the Segunda Liga in 2009. On 10 January 2010, he joined top-flight club Paços de Ferreira.

In 2010–11, Pizzi scored seven league goals for Paços, only missing three league matches. On 8 May 2011, he netted a hat-trick in a 3–3 draw at Porto, which turned out to be the only home league game that the eventual champions failed to win during the season. He scored twice on 3 March in a 4–3 win at Nacional to qualify the team for the 2011 Taça da Liga Final.

=== Spain ===
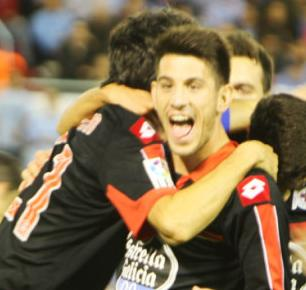
Pizzi celebrating a goal against rivals Celta Vigo in October 2012

On 30 August 2011, Pizzi moved to Spanish team Atlético Madrid, on loan until the end of the year, after which the Colchoneros had an option to buy the player permanently for €13.5 million, which they did in October of the following year. He made his La Liga debut on 18 September 2011, replacing also newly signed Radamel Falcao midway through the second half of a 4–0 home win against Racing de Santander. He scored his only Atlético goal to open a 3–2 win over Levante also at the Vicente Calderón Stadium on 20 November, totalling 15 appearances of which three were in the victorious UEFA Europa League campaign.

Along with several compatriots, initially still under contract with Braga, Pizzi moved to Deportivo de La Coruña for the 2012–13 campaign. In only his second appearance, through a penalty kick, he helped the Galicians come back from 1–3 at Valencia for a final 3–3 draw, scoring his team's last goal; he added a brace against Barcelona on 20 October 2012 – one of the goals coming through a free kick – but his team lost 4–5 at the Riazor Stadium.

On 26 July 2013, Pizzi signed a six-year contract with Benfica, for a fee of €6 million for half of his economic rights, being immediately loaned to Espanyol also in Spain's top flight.

=== Benfica ===
In the 2014–15 season, Pizzi joined Portuguese champions Benfica and was converted from winger to central midfielder, like his predecessor Enzo Pérez. On 5 October 2014, Pizzi debuted in a 4–0 win against Arouca in Primeira Liga. On 14 January 2015, Pizzi scored his first goal for Benfica, from a penalty kick, in another 4–0 home win against Arouca, this time in the third round of league cup. On 28 February, Pizzi scored his first goal for Benfica in the league, in the thrashing of Estoril (6–0).

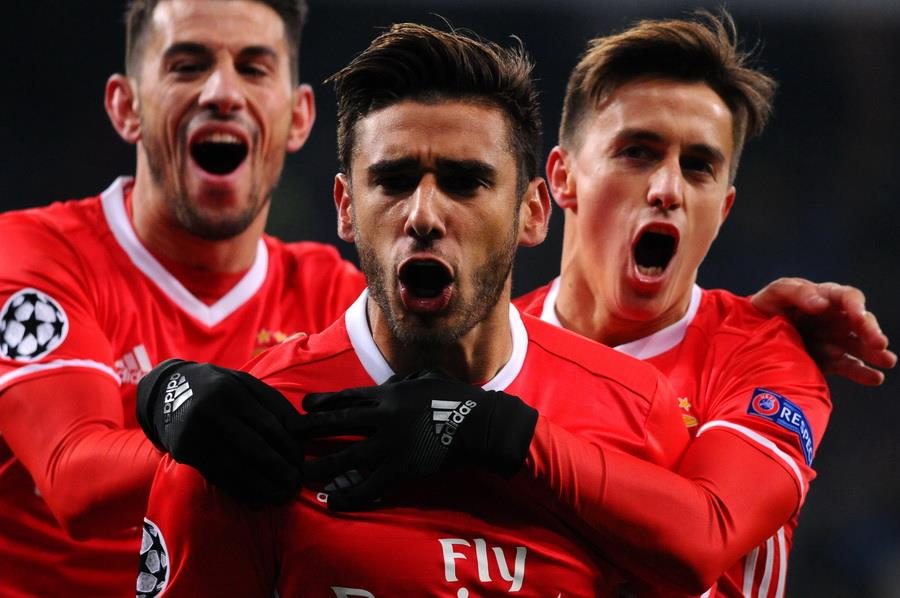
Pizzi (left), Eduardo Salvio and Franco Cervi celebrating a goal against Dynamo Kyiv in October 2016

Pizzi scored 12 times in 48 games over the 2016–17 season as Benfica won a domestic double. He was voted Player of the Month consecutively from October/November to December, and eventually Player of the Season at the LPFP Awards.

On 1 December 2017, during the Porto vs Benfica match, Pizzi was attacked in the back by a supporter of Porto who invaded the pitch; Porto faced a maximum of two behind closed doors matches but was only fined €2,860.

On 10 August 2018, Pizzi scored a first-half hat-trick in a 3–2 home win over Vitória de Guimarães in the opening (league) match of the 2018–19 season, and was again voted Player of the Month for August 2018. He scored 15 goals and made 23 assists in 55 matches overall that season as Benfica regained the league title, and at its conclusion he signed a new contract until 2023.

Pizzi scored twice in the 2019 Supertaça Cândido de Oliveira on 4 August, a 5–0 win over city rivals Sporting CP at the Estádio Algarve. By scoring twice on 14 December in a 4–0 win over Famalicão he had recorded 16 goals for the season, 11 of which in the league, making it already his highest-scoring season. He ended the season with 18, joint-best alongside teammate Carlos Vinícius and Rio Ave's Mehdi Taremi.

On 16 December 2020, Pizzi made his 300th Benfica appearance in a penalty shootout win over Vitória de Guimarães in the league cup quarter-finals; he scored a late spot-kick to draw the game 1–1. The following 23 November, he reached 350 games when he came on as a substitute in a goalless draw at Barcelona in the Champions League group stage; he was used more often from the bench in the 2021–22 season.

On 8 February 2022, after a controversial discussion and conflict with manager Jorge Jesus, Pizzi was loaned to İstanbul Başakşehir until the end of the Turkish Süper Lig season. He scored his only goal on his debut four days later, opening a 2–0 home win over Gaziantep.

=== Al Wahda ===
In the summer of 2022, Pizzi was not in the plans of new Benfica manager Roger Schmidt and was courted by several Middle Eastern clubs; he signed for Al Wahda of the UAE Pro League under compatriot manager Carlos Carvalhal as they offered him a two-year contract worth a net amount of €2 million per year.

=== Braga ===
On 30 January 2023, Pizzi returned to Portugal's top flight, having rescinded his contract with Al Wahda to join Braga on an 18-month deal. He scored his first goal on 8 April in a 4–1 home win over Estoril, nearly 16 years after first joining the club and 12 years after his first professional appearance for them; four days later he scored and assisted Simon Banza in a 5–0 win at Nacional in the first leg of the Taça de Portugal semi-final.

In August 2023, Pizzi scored in each leg of a 7–1 aggregate win over Serbia's TSC in the Champions League third qualifying round.

=== APOEL ===
On 7 September 2024, Pizzi joined Cypriot First Division club APOEL.

=== Estoril ===
On 4 June 2025, Pizzi signed a two-year contract with Estoril. In May 2026, he announced his retirement from professional football at the age of 36, citing chronic hip pain that had affected him for several years. His final match came against former club Benfica, where he received an ovation from both sets of supporters.

== International career ==
Pizzi made his debut for Portugal on 14 November 2012 in a friendly with Gabon, scoring through a penalty in an eventual 2–2 draw in Libreville.

He was selected for the 2017 FIFA Confederations Cup in Russia, playing two matches as the Portuguese finished third.

== Career statistics ==
=== Club ===
Appearances and goals by club, season and competition
| Club | Season | League | | | National cup (Note: Includes Taça de Portugal, Copa del Rey, UAE President's Cup, Cypriot Cup) | | League cup (Note: Includes Taça da Liga, UAE League Cup) | | Continental | | Other | | Total | |
| Club | Season | Division | Apps | Goals | Apps | Goals | Apps | Goals | Apps | Goals | Apps | Goals | Apps | Goals |
|---|---|---|---|---|---|---|---|---|---|---|---|---|---|---|
| Bragança | 2006–07 | Segunda Divisão | 4 | 1 | 0 | 0 | 0 | 0 | — | | — | | 4 | 1 |
| Braga | 2007–08 | Primeira Liga | 0 | 0 | 0 | 0 | 0 | 0 | — | | — | | 0 | 0 |
| Ribeirão (loan) | 2008–09 | Segunda Divisão | 25 | 1 | 0 | 0 | 0 | 0 | — | | — | | 25 | 1 |
| Covilhã (loan) | 2009–10 | Segunda Liga | 14 | 4 | 2 | 0 | 4 | 0 | — | | — | | 20 | 4 |
| Paços de Ferreira (loan) | 2009–10 | Primeira Liga | 15 | 1 | 2 | 1 | — | | — | | — | | 17 | 2 |
| Paços de Ferreira (loan) | 2010–11 | Primeira Liga | 27 | 7 | 2 | 1 | 6 | 3 | — | | — | | 35 | 11 |
| Paços de Ferreira (loan) | Total | | 42 | 8 | 4 | 2 | 6 | 3 | — | | — | | 52 | 13 |
| Braga | 2011–12 | Primeira Liga | 2 | 0 | — | | — | | — | | — | | 2 | 0 |
| Atlético Madrid (loan) | 2011–12 | La Liga | 11 | 1 | 2 | 0 | — | | 3 (Note: Appearances in UEFA Europa League) | 0 | — | | 16 | 1 |
| Deportivo La Coruña (loan) | 2012–13 | La Liga | 35 | 8 | 1 | 0 | — | | — | | — | | 36 | 8 |
| Espanyol (loan) | 2013–14 | La Liga | 28 | 3 | 6 | 1 | — | | — | | — | | 34 | 4 |
| Benfica | 2014–15 | Primeira Liga | 23 | 2 | 2 | 0 | 5 | 2 | 1 (Note: Appearance(s) in UEFA Champions League) | 0 | — | | 31 | 4 |
| Benfica | 2015–16 | Primeira Liga | 31 | 8 | 2 | 0 | 3 | 0 | 10 | 0 | 1 (Note: Appearance in Supertaça Cândido de Oliveira) | 0 | 47 | 8 |
| Benfica | 2016–17 | Primeira Liga | 33 | 10 | 7 | 2 | 3 | 0 | 8 | 0 | 1 | 1 | 52 | 13 |
| Benfica | 2017–18 | Primeira Liga | 33 | 6 | 3 | 0 | 2 | 0 | 6 | 0 | 1 | 0 | 45 | 6 |
| Benfica | 2018–19 | Primeira Liga | 34 | 13 | 4 | 0 | 3 | 0 | 14 (Note: Ten appearances and two goals in UEFA Champions League, four appearances in UEFA Europa League) | 2 | — | | 55 | 15 |
| Benfica | 2019–20 | Primeira Liga | 34 | 18 | 7 | 5 | 1 | 0 | 8 (Note: Six appearances and three goals in UEFA Champions League, two appearances and two goals in UEFA Europa League) | 5 | 1 | 2 | 51 | 30 |
| Benfica | 2020–21 | Primeira Liga | 32 | 6 | 6 | 1 | 2 | 2 | 9 (Note: One appearance in UEFA Champions League, eight appearances and seven goals in UEFA Europa League) | 7 | — | | 49 | 16 |
| Benfica | 2021–22 | Primeira Liga | 14 | 1 | 3 | 0 | 4 | 1 | 9 | 0 | — | | 30 | 2 |
| Benfica | Total | | 234 | 64 | 34 | 8 | 23 | 5 | 65 | 14 | 4 | 3 | 360 | 94 |
| İstanbul Başakşehir (loan) | 2021–22 | Süper Lig | 10 | 1 | — | | — | | — | | — | | 10 | 1 |
| Al Wahda | 2022–23 | UAE Pro League | 12 | 1 | 2 | 0 | 4 | 1 | — | | — | | 18 | 2 |
| Braga | 2022–23 | Primeira Liga | 16 | 2 | 4 | 1 | — | | 1 (Note: Appearance in UEFA Europa Conference League) | 0 | — | | 21 | 3 |
| Braga | 2023–24 | Primeira Liga | 29 | 1 | 3 | 0 | 4 | 1 | 8 (Note: Six appearances and two goals in UEFA Champions League, two appearances in UEFA Europa League) | 2 | — | | 44 | 4 |
| Braga | Total | | 45 | 3 | 7 | 1 | 4 | 1 | 9 | 2 | — | | 65 | 7 |
| APOEL | 2024–25 | Cypriot First Division | 22 | 4 | 2 | 0 | — | | 0 | 0 | 0 | 0 | 24 | 4 |
| Estoril | 2025–26 | Primeira Liga | 23 | 0 | 2 | 1 | 0 | 0 | — | | — | | 25 | 1 |
| Career total | | | 507 | 99 | 62 | 13 | 41 | 10 | 77 | 16 | 4 | 3 | 691 | 141 |

=== International ===
Appearances and goals by national team and year
| National team | Year | Apps | Goals |
|---|---|---|---|
| Portugal | 2012 | 1 | 1 |
| Portugal | 2013 | 1 | 0 |
| Portugal | 2014 | 0 | 0 |
| Portugal | 2015 | 2 | 0 |
| Portugal | 2016 | 0 | 0 |
| Portugal | 2017 | 5 | 1 |
| Portugal | 2018 | 4 | 0 |
| Portugal | 2019 | 4 | 1 |
| Total | | 17 | 3 |

Scores and results list Portugal's goal tally first, score column indicates score after each Pizzi goal.

List of international goals scored by Pizzi
| No. | Date | Venue | Opponent | Score | Result | Competition |
|---|---|---|---|---|---|---|
| 1 | 14 November 2012 | Stade Omar Bongo, Libreville, Gabon | Gabon | 1–1 | 2–2 | Friendly |
| 2 | 3 June 2017 | Estádio António Coimbra da Mota, Estoril, Portugal | Cyprus | 3–0 | 4–0 | Friendly |
| 3 | 14 November 2019 | Estádio Algarve, Faro, Portugal | Lithuania | 3–0 | 6–0 | UEFA Euro 2020 qualification |

== Honours ==
Paços de Ferreira

- Taça da Liga runner-up: 2010–11

Atlético Madrid

- UEFA Europa League: 2011–12

Benfica

- Primeira Liga: 2014–15, 2015–16, 2016–17, 2018–19
- Taça de Portugal: 2016–17; runner-up: 2020–21
- Taça da Liga: 2014–15, 2015–16
- Supertaça Cândido de Oliveira: 2016, 2017, 2019

Braga

- Taça da Liga: 2023–24

Portugal

- UEFA Nations League: 2018–19
- FIFA Confederations Cup third place: 2017

Individual

- Primeira Liga Midfielder of the Month: August 2018, October/November 2019, December 2019
- Primeira Liga Player of the Month: October/November 2016, December 2016, August 2018, August 2019, December 2019
- SJPF Primeira Liga Team of the Year: 2016, 2017
- LPFP Primeira Liga Player of the Year: 2016–17
- UEFA Primeira Liga Best Player: 2018–19, 2019–20
- Primeira Liga top scorer: 2019–20
- Primeira Liga top assist provider: 2016–17, 2018–19, 2019–20
- UEFA Europa League top scorer: 2020–21 (joint – 7 goals)
