= 2014–15 Segunda Liga =

25th season of second-tier football league in Portugal

Segunda Liga
- Season: 2014–15
- Champions: Tondela
- Promoted: Tondela; União da Madeira
- Relegated: Beira-Mar; Marítimo B Trofense
- Matches: 552
- Goals: 1,351 (2.45 per match)
- Top goalscorer: Erivelto (23 goals)
- Highest attendance: 7,930; Chaves 2–0 Oliveirense (24 May 2015)
- Lowest attendance: 72; Marítimo B 1–0 Freamunde (7 February 2015)
- All statistics correct as of 24 May 2015.

The 2014–15 Segunda Liga was the 25th season of the second-tier of football in Portugal. A total of 24 teams played in the league.

== Events ==
Atlético CP stayed in the 2014–15 Segunda Liga after being invited by the Portuguese League for Professional Football (LPFP) as the 2014–15 Primeira Liga competition was expanded to 18 teams, because Boavista was reintegrated, along with the expansion of the 2014–15 Segunda Liga competition to 24 teams and also to the impossibility of a 4th place club from the 2013–14 Campeonato Nacional de Seniores to be promoted.

== Teams ==
Location of teams in Segunda Liga 2014–15 (Mainland)
Location of teams in Segunda Liga 2014–15 (Madeira)
Location of teams in Segunda Liga 2014–15 (Azores)

=== Stadia and locations ===
Club	City	Stadium	Capacity	2013–14 finish
Académico de Viseu	Viseu	Estádio do Fontelo	12,000	11th
Atlético CP	Lisbon	Estádio da Tapadinha	15,000	22nd
Beira-Mar	Aveiro	Estádio Municipal de Aveiro	30,127	12th
Benfica B	Lisbon	Caixa Futebol Campus	3,000	5th
Braga B	Braga	Estádio 1º de Maio	30,000	20th
Chaves	Chaves	Estádio Municipal de Chaves	12,000	8th
Desportivo das Aves	Vila das Aves	Estádio do CD das Aves	10,250	4th
Farense	Faro	Estádio de São Luís	15,000	10th
Feirense	Santa Maria da Feira	Estádio Marcolino de Castro	4,667	14th
Freamunde	Freamunde	Complexo Desportivo do SC Freamunde	4,000	1st (CNS)
Leixões	Matosinhos	Estádio do Mar	16,035	17th
Marítimo B	Funchal	Campo da Imaculada Conceição	3,000	21st
Olhanense	Olhão	Estádio José Arcanjo	11,622	16th (Primeira Liga)
Oliveirense	Oliveira de Azeméis	Estádio Carlos Osório	9,100	18th
Oriental	Lisbon	Campo Engenheiro Carlos Salema	8,500	2nd (CNS)
Portimonense	Portimão	Estádio Municipal de Portimão	9,544	7th
Porto B	Porto	Estádio Municipal Jorge Sampaio	8,500	2nd
Santa Clara	Ponta Delgada	Estádio de São Miguel	13,277	15th
Sporting CP B	Lisbon	CGD Stadium Aurélio Pereira	1,000	6th
Sporting da Covilhã	Covilhã	Complexo Desportivo da Covilhã	3,000	16th
Tondela	Tondela	Estádio João Cardoso	2,600	9th
Trofense	Trofa	Estádio do Clube Desportivo Trofense	3,164	19th
União da Madeira	Funchal	Estádio da Madeira	3,000	13th
Vitória de Guimarães B	Guimarães	Estádio D. Afonso Henriques	30,165	3rd (CNS)

=== Managerial changes ===
Team	Outgoing manager	Manner of departure	Date of vacancy	Position in table	Incoming manager	Date of appointment
Leixões	(Portugal) Jorge Casquilha	Sacked	30 April 2014	Pre-season	(Portugal) Horácio Gonçalves	29 May 2014
Braga B	(Portugal) Bruno Pereira	Contract expired	11 May 2014	Pre-season	(Portugal) Fernando Pereira	26 June 2014
União da Madeira	(Portugal) Rui Mâncio	Contract expired	11 May 2014	Pre-season	(Portugal) Vítor Oliveira	27 May 2014
Porto B	(Portugal) José Guilherme	Contract expired	11 May 2014	Pre-season	(Portugal) Luís Castro	6 May 2014
Atlético CP	(Portugal) Jorge Simão	Contract expired	11 May 2014	Pre-season	(Portugal) Nascimento	25 June 2014
Marítimo B	(Portugal) Ivo Vieira	Contract expired	11 May 2014	Pre-season	(Portugal) Carlos Graça	12 May 2014
Tondela	(Portugal) Álvaro Magalhães	Mutual consent	12 May 2014	Pre-season	(Portugal) Carlos Pinto	18 May 2014
Santa Clara	(Portugal) Horácio Gonçalves	Mutual consent	14 May 2014	Pre-season	(Portugal) Cláudio Braga	6 June 2014
Académico de Viseu	(Portugal) Ricardo Chéu	Signed by Penafiel	16 May 2014	Pre-season	(Portugal) Alex Costa	20 May 2014
Olhanense	(Italy) Giuseppe Galderisi	Sacked	18 May 2014	Pre-season	(Portugal) Toni Conceição	9 July 2014
Freamunde	(Portugal) Carlos Pinto	Signed by Tondela	18 May 2014	Pre-season	(Portugal) Filó	29 May 2014
Chaves	(Portugal) Quim Machado	Mutual consent	21 May 2014	Pre-season	(Portugal) Luís Norton de Matos	2 June 2014
Beira-Mar	(Italy) Daniele Fortunato	Mutual consent	18 June 2014	Pre-season	(Portugal) Jorge Neves	18 June 2014
Sporting CP B	(Portugal) Abel Ferreira	Resigned	4 July 2014	Pre-season	(Portugal) Francisco Barão	6 July 2014
Tondela	(Portugal) Carlos Pinto	Resigned	6 October 2014	10th	(Portugal) Quim Machado	7 October 2014
Sporting CP B	(Portugal) Francisco Barão	Demoted to Assistant manager	6 October 2014	12th	(Portugal) João de Deus	6 October 2014
Olhanense	(Portugal) Toni Conceição	Mutual consent	8 October 2014	15th	(Portugal) Jorge Paixão	8 October 2014
Marítimo B	(Portugal) Carlos Graça	Mutual consent	8 October 2014	17th	(Portugal) Filipe Neto	10 October 2014
Santa Clara	(Portugal) Cláudio Braga	Sacked	30 October 2014	18th	(Portugal) Pedro Bermonte	30 October 2014
Académico de Viseu	(Portugal) Alex Costa	Mutual consent	12 November 2014	20th	(Portugal) Ricardo Chéu	13 November 2014
Farense	(Portugal) Pedro Correia	Mutual consent	24 November 2014	12th	(Portugal) Abel Xavier	1 December 2014
Santa Clara	(Portugal) Pedro Bermonte	Sacked	30 November 2014	19th	(Portugal) Filipe Gouveia	30 November 2014
Trofense	(Portugal) Porfírio Amorim	Sacked	15 December 2014	24th	(Portugal) Vítor Oliveira	21 December 2014
Beira-Mar	(Portugal) Jorge Neves	Sacked	16 December 2014	14th	(Portugal) Paulo Alves	27 December 2014
Chaves	(Portugal) Luís Norton de Matos	Mutual consent	22 December 2014	4th	(Portugal) Carlos Pinto	23 December 2014
Atlético CP	(Portugal) Rui Nascimento	Sacked	6 January 2015	20th	(Angola) Lázaro Oliveira	9 January 2015
Trofense	(Portugal) Vítor Oliveira	Demoted to Assistant Manager	19 January 2015	24th	(Portugal) Vítor Campelos	19 January 2015
Trofense	(Portugal) Vítor Campelos	Mutual consent	20 April 2015	24th	(Portugal) Vítor Oliveira	20 April 2015

== League table ==
Pos	Team	Pld	W	D	L	GF	GA	GD	Pts	Promotion or Relegation
1	Tondela (C, P)	46	21	18	7	67	51	+16	81	Promotion to Primeira Liga
2	União da Madeira (P)	46	22	14	10	69	39	+30	80	Promotion to Primeira Liga
3	Chaves	46	20	20	6	68	45	+23	80	
4	Sporting da Covilhã	46	23	11	12	78	46	+32	80	
5	Sporting CP B	46	22	12	12	66	57	+9	78	
6	Benfica B	46	22	11	13	81	60	+21	77	
7	Feirense	46	21	12	13	61	51	+10	75	
8	Freamunde	46	18	17	11	48	32	+16	71	
9	Vitória de Guimarães B	46	19	8	19	71	57	+14	65	
10	Beira-Mar (Note: Beira-Mar were relegated due to financial debts so Atlético remains in II Liga.) (R)	46	16	15	15	52	48	+4	63	Relegation to district level
11	Farense	46	16	14	16	51	54	−3	62	
12	Académico de Viseu	46	17	11	18	55	56	−1	62	
13	Porto B	46	17	10	19	66	64	+2	61	
14	Portimonense	46	15	15	16	56	62	−6	60	
15	Oriental	46	15	13	18	47	59	−12	58	
16	Olhanense	46	13	16	17	51	56	−5	55	
17	Oliveirense	46	14	13	19	50	67	−17	55	
18	Desportivo das Aves	46	12	17	17	52	58	−6	53	
19	Santa Clara	46	10	21	15	33	42	−9	51	
20	Leixões	46	13	11	22	53	67	−14	50	
21	Braga B	46	12	15	19	48	62	−14	49 (Note: Braga B were deducted a total of 5 points for fielding four ineligible players.)	
22	Atlético CP	46	11	14	21	56	70	−14	47	
23	Marítimo B (R)	46	10	11	25	37	67	−30	41	Relegation to Campeonato de Portugal
24	Trofense (R)	46	9	9	28	35	81	−46	36	Relegation to Campeonato de Portugal

Source: LPFP
Rules for classification: 1) points; 2) points in matches between tied teams; 3) goal difference in matches between tied teams; 4) away goals in matches between tied teams; 5) goal difference; 6) wins; 7) goals scored. The LPFP decided that only criteria 1, 5, 6 and 7 would be applied to establish the classification during the competition.
(C) Champions; (P) Promoted; (R) Relegated

=== Positions by round ===
Team ╲ Round	1	2	3	4	5	6	7	8	9	10	11	12	13	14	15	16	17	18	19	20	21	22	23	24	25	26	27	28	29	30	31	32	33	34	35	36	37	38	39	40	41	42	43	44	45	46
Tondela	7	5	9	9	10	14	8	6	7	11	7	10	5	7	8	6	6	6	4	3	1	2	2	1	1	1	1	1	3	3	3	3	3	2	2	2	2	1	1	1	1	1	1	1	1	1
União da Madeira	5	1	2	5	7	6	4	4	3	4	6	7	8	6	5	5	3	4	5	8	10	8	9	10	8	5	8	10	6	5	4	4	4	7	7	6	5	3	3	7	6	5	5	4	3	2
Chaves	10	16	8	8	4	3	2	3	5	5	4	3	3	5	6	7	5	3	3	4	4	5	6	5	5	3	2	2	1	2	1	1	1	1	1	1	1	2	2	2	2	3	3	2	4	3
Sporting da Covilhã	10	5	9	7	15	19	22	18	12	8	12	14	15	11	12	11	11	10	12	10	9	10	10	7	11	10	10	7	10	7	7	7	5	5	4	4	7	6	5	4	3	4	2	3	2	4
Sporting CP B	19	9	4	2	3	7	7	12	15	9	5	6	10	12	13	15	16	13	13	11	11	13	14	12	12	11	12	11	7	8	9	8	7	6	6	5	4	7	7	6	4	2	4	5	6	5
Benfica B	4	11	3	1	1	1	3	2	2	3	2	2	4	2	3	3	4	5	6	5	5	3	4	4	4	6	5	5	4	4	5	5	6	4	3	3	3	5	6	5	7	6	7	7	7	6
Feirense	24	22	23	24	24	24	24	24	23	23	22	16	14	15	16	14	12	12	8	6	6	7	7	8	10	8	11	8	11	10	12	10	11	8	8	7	6	4	4	3	5	7	6	6	5	7
Freamunde	7	3	5	3	2	2	1	1	1	1	1	1	1	1	1	1	2	2	2	1	2	1	1	3	3	4	4	3	2	1	2	2	2	3	5	8	8	9	8	8	8	8	8	8	8	8
Vitória de Guimarães B	1	8	12	18	16	20	15	9	13	15	11	8	9	9	7	9	7	8	10	13	14	14	11	11	9	7	6	6	9	11	10	12	9	11	11	10	10	10	11	10	10	10	9	9	9	9
Beira-Mar	17	23	21	22	17	11	6	10	8	10	13	9	6	4	4	4	9	9	11	12	12	11	12	13	13	14	14	14	14	14	15	15	14	13	14	15	14	13	13	12	11	11	12	11	10	10
Farense	7	15	17	10	12	7	11	7	6	6	8	13	11	13	14	12	13	14	18	14	15	12	13	17	17	17	16	16	17	16	16	16	16	17	18	17	18	17	16	16	16	14	13	13	14	11
Académico de Viseu	10	18	24	20	20	13	14	15	10	14	15	15	19	19	20	21	19	16	14	15	13	15	15	16	15	13	13	13	13	13	13	14	13	15	13	16	13	15	14	15	14	16	14	14	11	12
Porto B	22	24	22	19	22	22	20	14	19	13	9	5	7	8	9	8	8	7	9	9	8	9	8	9	7	12	9	12	8	9	8	9	10	10	9	9	9	8	9	9	9	9	10	10	12	13
Portimonense	10	20	19	14	8	9	9	13	9	7	10	11	12	10	10	10	10	11	7	7	7	4	5	6	6	9	7	9	12	12	11	11	12	12	12	12	11	11	10	11	12	12	11	12	13	14
Oriental	10	7	11	14	14	15	18	22	21	22	24	22	23	23	19	20	17	20	17	19	16	16	16	14	16	16	17	15	15	15	14	13	15	14	15	13	16	14	15	14	15	13	15	15	15	15
Olhanense	3	4	13	12	6	8	13	8	11	17	16	18	16	16	15	17	18	15	16	16	17	17	18	19	18	18	19	19	20	22	22	21	21	19	19	19	19	19	20	20	20	19	20	18	17	16
Oliveirense	2	2	1	4	5	4	5	5	4	2	3	4	2	3	2	2	1	1	1	2	3	6	3	2	2	2	3	4	5	6	6	6	8	9	10	11	12	12	12	13	13	15	16	16	16	17
Desportivo das Aves	5	13	7	11	13	17	17	20	17	18	19	21	18	17	17	16	15	18	19	20	21	21	21	20	19	19	18	18	16	17	18	18	18	18	17	18	17	18	18	18	19	20	17	19	19	18
Santa Clara	10	21	15	17	9	10	10	16	16	16	18	17	20	20	21	19	21	19	21	21	22	22	22	22	22	23	23	22	21	19	21	20	20	21	22	21	20	20	19	19	18	18	18	17	18	19
Leixões	23	13	14	16	19	12	16	11	18	12	14	12	13	14	11	13	14	17	15	17	18	18	17	15	14	15	15	17	18	18	17	17	17	16	16	14	15	16	17	17	17	17	19	20	21	20
Braga B	19	10	16	21	23	22	23	19	14	19	20	20	22	22	24	24	22	22	22	22	20	20	20	21	21	21	21	23	23	21	20	19	19	20	20	20	21	21	21	21	21	21	21	21	20	21
Atlético CP	19	18	18	13	18	21	21	23	24	21	17	19	17	18	18	18	20	21	20	18	19	19	19	18	20	20	20	21	19	20	19	23	23	23	23	23	22	22	22	22	22	22	22	22	22	22
Marítimo B	17	12	5	6	11	18	12	17	20	20	21	23	21	21	23	23	24	24	23	23	23	23	23	23	23	22	22	20	22	23	23	22	22	22	21	22	23	23	23	23	23	23	23	23	23	23
Trofense	16	17	20	23	21	16	19	21	22	24	23	24	24	24	22	22	23	23	24	24	24	24	24	24	24	24	24	24	24	24	24	24	24	24	24	24	24	24	24	24	24	24	24	24	24	24

Source: LPFP

== Results ==
Home \ Away	ACV	ACP	BEM	BEN	BRA	CHA	DAV	FAR	FEI	FRM	LEI	MAR	OLI	OLH	ORI	PTM	POR	STC	SCP	SCO	TON	TRO	UNI	VGU
Académico de Viseu		0–1	0–0	2–0	1–1	1–1	3–0	1–0	0–1	1–2	2–1	3–0	1–0	1–0	4–0	1–0	0–0	3–0	0–3	0–1	1–0	2–0	0–2	2–0
Atlético CP	0–1		1–1	2–3	1–1	2–2	3–0	1–1	1–3	1–1	2–1	2–2	1–2	3–2	0–1	1–2	2–1	2–1	5–0	2–1	1–2	0–3	1–1	2–0
Beira-Mar	1–1	2–2		1–2	1–0	1–1	1–0	1–0	1–2	1–1	0–0	2–1	2–4	0–1	1–0	1–3	0–2	0–0	2–1	1–1	1–1	3–0	1–2	1–0
Benfica B	4–0	2–2	1–2		1–0	2–2	2–1	2–0	0–1	1–1	1–2	3–0	4–1	5–1	3–0	4–1	3–2	1–1	0–0	3–1	0–2	3–2	1–3	2–1
Braga B	2–1	4–2	0–3	3–2		2–3	2–0	0–0	1–3	0–3	3–0	1–0	1–0	2–0	1–0	0–2	2–2	0–0	2–3	1–2	1–2	1–2	0–3	1–1
Chaves	1–1	1–0	3–0	0–0	2–1		2–0	1–0	2–0	1–1	1–0	2–0	2–0	1–1	1–1	1–2	0–0	3–1	3–2	1–0	1–1	6–0	0–3	2–0
Desportivo das Aves	2–3	1–1	1–0	3–3	1–1	2–3		2–0	2–1	1–1	3–2	2–1	0–0	0–0	1–0	0–0	0–3	1–1	4–0	1–1	0–1	3–0	1–1	2–1
Farense	3–0	2–0	1–0	0–3	1–1	0–1	2–2		4–1	2–1	3–0	1–1	3–3	2–2	1–0	1–0	1–0	0–1	1–0	1–0	1–2	1–1	0–5	1–1
Feirense	3–0	2–1	1–2	2–2	3–1	1–1	1–0	1–1		0–0	2–1	1–0	2–2	2–2	1–0	2–1	1–2	2–1	2–0	2–1	0–0	2–0	1–1	1–2
Freamunde	1–3	1–0	0–0	2–0	1–0	1–1	1–1	0–0	2–0		2–0	0–1	3–0	0–2	3–0	0–0	0–2	0–0	0–0	0–1	1–1	3–0	0–0	2–0
Leixões	1–0	3–0	1–2	2–1	0–0	1–2	2–1	1–3	3–1	0–1		3–0	4–1	2–1	1–2	1–0	2–3	0–0	0–0	3–3	1–1	2–1	2–1	0–1
Marítimo B	1–0	2–5	1–3	2–0	0–1	1–1	0–2	0–1	0–1	1–0	1–1		0–0	1–0	2–3	1–0	0–0	0–1	2–1	2–1	2–3	0–0	1–2	3–2
Oliveirense	3–3	1–0	0–0	0–1	2–1	2–1	1–1	2–2	0–1	1–2	1–0	1–1		1–3	0–1	2–4	1–0	1–0	1–2	2–1	1–0	3–1	2–2	1–0
Olhanense	0–0	1–1	0–0	1–2	0–1	3–0	2–3	1–3	0–0	1–0	2–0	3–0	2–1		1–1	2–0	2–2	0–0	0–1	0–0	3–1	1–0	0–1	1–1
Oriental	1–1	2–0	1–0	0–0	1–1	0–0	1–0	0–1	2–0	0–0	3–1	2–1	1–0	0–2		2–2	3–0	1–0	3–4	0–2	1–1	4–0	0–3	1–0
Portimonense	4–2	1–2	0–3	2–2	3–2	2–1	1–1	1–1	3–2	0–2	1–1	2–2	2–1	1–1	0–0		2–0	1–1	0–1	1–1	1–1	2–3	1–0	0–0
Porto B	3–2	1–1	3–2	0–3	2–3	2–2	2–1	2–1	1–0	2–0	1–1	3–1	1–3	7–0	1–0	0–1		0–1	0–1	4–0	1–1	3–2	1–1	3–0
Santa Clara	2–0	1–0	2–2	1–1	0–0	1–1	0–0	1–1	0–0	0–1	2–0	2–0	2–1	0–0	1–1	1–0	1–0		0–1	0–2	2–2	0–0	1–2	1–3
Sporting CP B	2–1	2–0	3–2	0–1	0–0	1–1	3–0	5–3	2–2	0–2	3–1	1–1	0–0	2–1	4–3	0–0	2–1	3–1		0–0	4–3	2–1	0–1	2–3
Sporting da Covilhã	1–1	1–0	2–0	3–0	4–0	0–3	1–0	1–0	2–2	3–1	3–0	2–1	4–1	3–3	7–1	4–0	2–1	1–1	2–0		4–0	2–0	1–0	2–0
Tondela	1–1	1–1	1–0	2–1	1–0	2–2	0–3	1–0	1–0	1–1	0–0	1–0	0–0	1–0	4–2	4–2	3–1	2–1	0–0	2–2		4–0	3–1	2–3
Trofense	2–1	2–0	0–3	0–2	1–1	0–1	2–2	0–1	0–3	2–1	0–2	1–1	0–1	0–1	1–0	1–2	2–0	0–0	1–1	1–0	2–2		1–1	1–5
União da Madeira	4–2	2–2	0–0	2–3	1–1	1–1	1–1	3–0	0–2	1–2	3–1	2–0	0–0	1–0	0–0	0–1	5–1	1–0	0–1	2–1	1–2	1–0		1–0
Vitória de Guimarães B	1–2	4–0	1–2	4–1	1–1	3–0	1–0	2–0	3–0	0–1	3–3	0–0	5–0	3–2	2–2	3–2	3–0	2–0	1–3	2–1	1–2	2–0	0–1	

Source: Segunda Liga
Legend: Blue = home team win; Yellow = draw; Red = away team win.

== Statistics ==
=== Top scorers ===
Rank	Player	Team	Goals
1	(Brazil) Erivelto	Covilhã	23
1	(Portugal) Tozé Marreco	Tondela	23
3	(Guinea-Bissau) Frédéric Mendy	União Madeira	20
4	(Portugal) Rui Fonte	Benfica B	17
5	(Brazil) Luiz Phellype	Feirense	15
5	(Paraguay) Mauro Caballero	Desportivo das Aves	15
7	(United States) Bjørn Johnsen	Atlético CP	14
7	(Chile) Diego Rubio	Sporting B	14
7	(Brazil) Rafael Crivellaro	Vitória Guimarães B	14
7	(Portugal) Élio Martins	União Madeira	14
7	(Portugal) Areias	Vitória Guimarães B	14
7	(Portugal) Fábio Martins	Braga B	14

Sources: LPFP (in Portuguese)

=== Hat-tricks ===
Player	For	Against	Result	Date
(Portugal) Ivo Rodrigues	Porto B	Olhanense	7–0	5 October 2014
(Portugal) Tozé Marreco	Tondela	União Madeira	3–1	11 October 2014
(Portugal) Hélder Costa	Benfica B	Olhanense	5–1	5 November 2014
(Uruguay) Jonathan Rodríguez	Benfica B	Portimonense	4–1	18 March 2015
(Guinea-Bissau) Frédéric Mendy	União Madeira	Braga B	3–0	27 March 2015
(Guinea-Bissau) Frédéric Mendy^{1}	União Madeira	Académico Viseu	4–2	11 April 2015
(Uganda) Kizito	Covilhã	Leixões	3–3	15 April 2015

Note

^{1} Player scored 4 goals

== Awards ==
=== Monthly awards ===
==== SJPF Segunda Liga Player of the Month ====
Month	Player	Club
August	(United States) Bjørn Johnsen	Atlético CP
September	(United States) Bjørn Johnsen	Atlético CP
October	(Portugal) Gonçalo Guedes	Benfica B
November	(Brazil) Rafael Crivellaro	Vitória de Guimarães B
December	(Portugal) Gonçalo Guedes	Benfica B
January	(Portugal) Tozé Marreco	Tondela
February	(Portugal) Gonçalo Paciência	Porto B
March	(France) Frédéric Mendy	União da Madeira
April	(Portugal) Tozé Marreco	Tondela

==== SJPF Segunda Liga Young Player of the Month ====
Month	Player	Club
August	(Portugal) João Pinho	Oliveirense
September	(Portugal) João Pinho	Oliveirense
October	(Portugal) João Pinho	Oliveirense
November	(Portugal) João Pinho	Oliveirense
December	(Portugal) Cláudio Ramos	Tondela
January	(Portugal) Pedro Eira	Braga B
February	(Portugal) Cláudio Ramos	Tondela
March	(Portugal) Raphael Guzzo	Chaves
April	(Portugal) Gelson Martins	Sporting B

== Attendances ==
#	Club	Average
1	Chaves	2,132
2	Vitória B	1,629
3	CF União	1,260
4	Farense	871
5	Feirense	835
6	Tondela	816
7	Freamunde	811
8	Benfica B	791
9	Leixões	740
10	Viseu	713
11	Portimonense	655
12	Beira-Mar	644
13	Oriental	599
14	Santa Clara	588
15	Olhanense	562
16	Oliveirense	535
17	Aves	530
18	Trofense	528
19	Covilhã	478
20	Porto B	458
21	Braga B	442
22	Atlético CP	367
23	Sporting B	276
24	Marítimo B	241

== See also ==
- 2014–15 Primeira Liga
- 2014–15 Campeonato Nacional
- 2014–15 Taça de Portugal
- 2014–15 Taça da Liga
