= 2016–17 LigaPro =

27th season of second-tier football league in Portugal

LigaPro
- Season: 2016–17
- Champions: Portimonense; 1st title
- Promoted: Portimonense; Desportivo das Aves
- Relegated: Vizela; Fafe; Freamunde; Olhanense
- Matches: 253
- Goals: 576 (2.28 per match)
- Top goalscorer: Jorge Pires (15 goals)
- Biggest home win: Vitória de Guimarães B 5–0 Santa Clara (15 January 2017)
- Biggest away win: Vitória de Guimarães B 1–5 Portimonense (11 September 2016)
- Highest scoring: Famalicão 4–2 Olhanense (13 August 2016); Sporting CP B 2–4 Fafe (20 August 2016); Vitória de Guimarães B 1–5 Portimonense (11 September 2016); Sporting CP B 5–1 Cova da Piedade (28 September 2016)
- Longest winning run: 7 matches Desportivo das Aves
- Longest unbeaten run: 19 matches Desportivo das Aves
- Longest winless run: 13 matches Olhanense
- Longest losing run: 9 matches Olhanense
- Highest attendance: 4,164; Famalicão 3–1 Fafe (6 November 2016)
- Lowest attendance: 0 Leixões 0–0 Famalicão (6 August 2016); Leixões 1–2 Porto B (20 August 2016)
- Total attendance: 246,899
- Average attendance: 976
- All statistics correct as of 23 January 2017.

The 2016–17 LigaPro (also known as Ledman LigaPro for sponsorship reasons) was the 27th season of Portuguese football's second-tier league, and the third season under the current LigaPro title. A total of 22 teams competed in this division, including reserve sides from top-flight Primeira Liga teams.

Porto B were the defending champions, after winning their first title in the competition in the previous season.

== Teams ==
A total of 22 teams contest the league, including 17 sides from the 2015–16 season, two teams relegated from the 2015–16 Primeira Liga (União da Madeira and Académica) and three promoted from the 2015–16 Campeonato de Portugal (Cova da Piedade, Vizela and Fafe).

Other team changes compared to the previous season included the promotion of Chaves and Feirense to the 2016–17 Primeira Liga, and the relegation of Farense, Mafra, Atlético CP, Oriental and Oliveirense to the 2016–17 Campeonato de Portugal.

On 15 March 2016, the LPFP announced that four teams (instead of three) will be relegated to the 2017–18 Campeonato de Portugal, and two teams (instead of three) will be promoted directly from the Campeonato de Portugal to reduce the number of LigaPro teams to 20 for the 2017–18 season. There will be also a two-legged promotion/relegation play-off involving the 17th- and 18th-placed teams of 2016–17 LigaPro and both second-placed teams of the Campeonato de Portugal promotion groups (North and South).

=== Team changes ===
Promoted from 2015–16 Campeonato de Portugal

- Cova da Piedade (Champions, South zone promotion group winner)
- Vizela (Runners-up, North zone promotion group winner)
- Fafe (Promotion play-off winner)

Relegated from 2015–16 Primeira Liga

- União da Madeira
- Académica

Promoted to 2016–17 Primeira Liga

- Chaves
- Feirense

Relegated to 2016–17 Campeonato de Portugal

- Farense
- Mafra
- Atlético CP
- Oriental
- Oliveirense

=== Stadia and locations ===
Location of teams in 2016–17 LigaPro (Mainland)
Location of teams in 2016–17 LigaPro (Azores)
Location of teams in 2016–17 LigaPro (Madeira)

Team	Location	Stadium	Capacity	2015–16 finish
Académica	Coimbra	Estádio Cidade de Coimbra	29,622	18th (PL)
Académico de Viseu	Viseu	Estádio do Fontelo	7,744	17th
Benfica B	Lisbon	Caixa Futebol Campus	2,720	19th
Braga B	Braga	Estádio 1º de Maio	28,000	15th
Cova da Piedade	Cova da Piedade	Estádio Municipal José Martins Vieira (Note: Cova da Piedade played one home match at Caixa Futebol Campus, Seixal, due to renovations at their own stadium.)	3,000	1st (CP)
Desportivo das Aves	Vila das Aves	Estádio do CD Aves	5,441	8th
Fafe	Fafe	Estádio Municipal de Fafe (Note: Fafe will play some home matches at Estádio Dr. Machado de Matos, Felgueiras and at Estádio Municipal de Amarante, Amarante, due to renovations at their own stadium.)	8,000	3rd (CP)
Famalicão	Vila Nova de Famalicão	Estádio Municipal 22 de Junho	5,300	6th
Freamunde	Freamunde	Complexo Desportivo do SC Freamunde	3,919	5th
Gil Vicente	Barcelos	Estádio Cidade de Barcelos	12,046	11th
Leixões	Matosinhos	Estádio do Mar	9,766	18th
Olhanense	Olhão	Estádio José Arcanjo	5,661	7th
Penafiel	Penafiel	Estádio Municipal 25 de Abril	5,320	12th
Portimonense	Portimão	Estádio Municipal de Portimão	5,950	4th
Porto B	Porto	Estádio Municipal Jorge Sampaio	8,270	1st
Santa Clara	Ponta Delgada	Estádio de São Miguel	13,277	16th
Sporting CP B	Lisbon	CGD Stadium Aurélio Pereira	1,180	10th
Sporting da Covilhã	Covilhã	Estádio Municipal José dos Santos Pinto	2,055	14th
União da Madeira	Funchal	Centro Desportivo da Madeira	2,300	17th (PL)
Varzim	Póvoa de Varzim	Estádio do Varzim SC	7,280	9th
Vitória de Guimarães B	Guimarães	Estádio D. Afonso Henriques	30,000	13th
Vizela	Vizela	Estádio do FC Vizela	6,000	2nd (CP)

=== Personnel and sponsors ===
Team	Head coach	Kit manufacturer	Sponsors
Académica	(Portugal) Costinha	Nike	EFAPEL
Académico de Viseu	(Portugal) Francisco Chaló	Macron	Palácio do Gelo
Benfica B	(Portugal) Hélder Cristóvão	Adidas	Emirates
Braga B	(Portugal) João Aroso	Lacatoni	
Cova da Piedade	(Portugal) João Barbosa	Adidas	Servintegra
Desportivo das Aves	(Portugal) José Mota	Nike	WoWalBo
Fafe	(Portugal) Manuel Monteiro	Gsports	Faftir
Famalicão	(Portugal) Dito	Lacatoni	Amob
Freamunde	(Portugal) Daniel Barbosa	Adidas	LGSP Sports
Gil Vicente	(Portugal) Álvaro Magalhães	Macron	Barcelos / Crédito Agrícola
Leixões	(Portugal) Daniel Kenedy	Adidas	Mar à Mesa
Olhanense	(Portugal) Bruno Saraiva	Macron	OLX
Penafiel	(Portugal) Paulo Alves	Macron	Restradas
Portimonense	(Portugal) Vítor Oliveira	Mizuno	McDonald's Portimão
Porto B	(Portugal) António Folha	New Balance	
Santa Clara	(Portugal) Carlos Pinto	Nike	Açoreana Seguros
Sporting CP B	(Portugal) Luís Martins	Macron	
Sporting da Covilhã	(Portugal) Filipe Gouveia	Lacatoni	Natura / MB Hotels
União da Madeira	(Portugal) Jorge Casquilha	Lacatoni	Museu CR7
Varzim	(Portugal) João Eusébio	Stadio	Carnes São José
Vitória de Guimarães B	(Portugal) Vítor Campelos	Macron	Banco BIC
Vizela	(Portugal) Carlos Cunha	CDT	Vizelpas

=== Coaching changes ===
Team	Outgoing head coach	Manner of departure	Date of vacancy	Position in table	Incoming head coach	Date of appointment
Gil Vicente	(Portugal) Nandinho	Mutual consent	14 May 2016	Pre-season	(Portugal) Álvaro Magalhães	18 May 2016
Desportivo das Aves	(Portugal) Ulisses Morais	Sacked	17 May 2016	Pre-season	(Portugal) Ivo Vieira	27 May 2016
União da Madeira	(Portugal) Luís Norton de Matos	Contract expired	17 May 2016	Pre-season	(Portugal) Filó	21 June 2016
Sporting da Covilhã	(Portugal) Francisco Chaló	Mutual consent	18 May 2016	Pre-season	(Portugal) Filipe Gouveia	2 June 2016
Famalicão	(Portugal) Daniel Ramos	Resigned	18 May 2016	Pre-season	(Portugal) Ulisses Morais	27 May 2016
Varzim	(Portugal) Capucho	Signed by Rio Ave	21 May 2016	Pre-season	(Portugal) Armando Evangelista	25 May 2016
Santa Clara	(Portugal) Carlos Pinto	Signed by Paços de Ferreira	24 May 2016	Pre-season	(Portugal) Daniel Ramos	3 June 2016
Académico de Viseu	(Portugal) Jorge Casquilha	Contract expired	31 May 2016	Pre-season	(Portugal) André David	31 May 2016
Académica	(Portugal) Filipe Gouveia			Pre-season	(Portugal) Costinha	20 June 2016
Leixões	(Portugal) Pedro Miguel			Pre-season	(Portugal) Filipe Coelho	22 June 2016
Portimonense	(Portugal) José Augusto	Promoted to manager	26 June 2016	Pre-season	(Portugal) Vítor Oliveira	29 June 2016
Santa Clara	(Portugal) Daniel Ramos	Signed by Marítimo	21 September 2016	2nd	(Portugal) Hugo Relvas (caretaker)	21 September 2016
Santa Clara	(Portugal) Hugo Relvas (caretaker)	Ended caretaking role	26 September 2016	2nd	(Portugal) Quim Machado	26 September 2016
Santa Clara	(Portugal) Quim Machado	Resigned	3 October 2016	2nd	(Portugal) Rui Amorim	5 October 2016
Famalicão	(Portugal) Ulisses Morais	Resigned	11 October 2016	18th	(Portugal) Rui Silva (caretaker)	12 October 2016
Varzim	(Portugal) Armando Evangelista	Mutual consent	13 October 2016	13th	(Portugal) João Eusébio	13 October 2016 (as caretaker); 31 October 2016 (confirmed)
Famalicão	(Portugal) Rui Silva (caretaker)	Ended caretaking role	17 October 2016	18th	(Portugal) Nandinho	17 October 2016
Freamunde	(Portugal) Carlos Brito	Mutual consent	25 October 2016	21st	(Portugal) Ricardo Chéu	27 October 2016
Olhanense	(Italy) Cristiano Bacci	Mutual consent	27 October 2016	22nd	(Portugal) Bruno Baltazar	28 October 2016
Leixões	(Portugal) Filipe Coelho	Mutual consent	2 November 2016	20th	(Portugal) Daniel Kenedy	2 November 2016
Porto B	(Portugal) Luís Castro	Signed by Rio Ave	12 November 2016	10th	(Portugal) José Tavares	14 November 2016
Académico de Viseu	(Portugal) André David	Mutual consent	29 November 2016	19th	(Portugal) Octávio Moreira (caretaker)	29 November 2016
Académico de Viseu	(Portugal) Octávio Moreira (caretaker)	Ended caretaking role	5 December 2016	19th	(Portugal) Francisco Chaló	5 December 2016
Santa Clara	(Portugal) Rui Amorim	Sacked	5 December 2016	4th	(Portugal) Carlos Pinto	6 December 2016
Fafe	(Portugal) Agostinho Bento	Mutual consent	12 December 2016	18th	(Portugal) Tonau	15 December 2016
Vizela	(Portugal) Ricardo Soares	Signed by Chaves	18 December 2016	8th	(Portugal) Bruno Pinto (caretaker)	19 December 2016
União da Madeira	(Portugal) Filó	Sacked	22 December 2016	17th	(Portugal) José Viterbo (caretaker)	22 December 2016
Vizela	(Portugal) Bruno Pinto (caretaker)	Ended caretaking role	26 December 2016	11th	(Portugal) Rui Quinta	26 December 2016
Porto B	(Portugal) José Tavares	Moved to a different department	29 December 2016	15th	(Portugal) António Folha	29 December 2016
União da Madeira	(Portugal) José Viterbo (caretaker)	Ended caretaking role	9 January 2017	14th	(Portugal) Jorge Casquilha	9 January 2017
Olhanense	(Portugal) Bruno Baltazar	Resigned	7 February 2017	22nd	(Portugal) Bruno Saraiva	7 February 2017
Cova da Piedade	(Portugal) Sérgio Boris	Sacked	12 February 2017	13th	(Portugal) João Barbosa	12 February 2017
Desportivo das Aves	(Portugal) Ivo Vieira	Sacked	15 February 2017	2nd	(Portugal) José Mota	18 February 2017
Sporting CP B	(Portugal) João de Deus	Mutual consent	17 February 2017	12th	(Portugal) Luís Martins	17 February 2017
Vizela	(Portugal) Rui Quinta	Sacked	13 March 2017	19th	(Portugal) Carlos Cunha	14 March 2017
Freamunde	(Portugal) Ricardo Chéu	Resigned	1 April 2017	21st	(Portugal) Daniel Barbosa	5 April 2017
Famalicão	(Portugal) Nandinho	Resigned	2 April 2017	17th	(Portugal) Dito	5 April 2017
Fafe	(Portugal) Tonau	Mutual consent	10 April 2017	20th	(Portugal) Manuel Monteiro	11 April 2017
Braga B	(Portugal) Abel Ferreira	Moved to the main Braga squad	24 April 2017	5th	(Portugal) João Aroso	2 May 2017

== Season summary ==
=== League table ===
Pos	Team	Pld	W	D	L	GF	GA	GD	Pts	Promotion or relegation
1	Portimonense (C, P)	42	25	8	9	70	39	+31	83	Promotion to the Primeira Liga
2	Desportivo das Aves (P)	42	23	12	7	63	38	+25	81	Promotion to the Primeira Liga
3	União da Madeira	42	17	13	12	52	43	+9	64	
4	Benfica B	42	18	9	15	56	58	−2	63	Ineligible for promotion
5	Penafiel	42	18	9	15	56	55	+1	63	
6	Académica	42	17	11	14	42	35	+7	62	
7	Braga B	42	16	14	12	64	50	+14	62	Ineligible for promotion
8	Sporting da Covilhã	42	15	17	10	51	41	+10	62	
9	Varzim	42	17	10	15	45	48	−3	61	
10	Santa Clara	42	16	12	14	44	42	+2	60	
11	Vitória de Guimarães B	42	18	6	18	54	50	+4	60	Ineligible for promotion
12	Porto B	42	16	12	14	52	49	+3	60	Ineligible for promotion
13	Gil Vicente	42	13	17	12	47	49	−2	56	
14	Sporting CP B	42	15	10	17	64	62	+2	55	Ineligible for promotion
15	Famalicão	42	14	11	17	47	50	−3	53	
16	Cova da Piedade	42	14	11	17	45	60	−15	53	
17	Académico de Viseu (O)	42	13	13	16	49	54	−5	52	Qualification for the relegation play-offs
18	Leixões (O)	42	10	16	16	44	48	−4	46	Qualification for the relegation play-offs
19	Vizela (R)	42	9	19	14	39	49	−10	46	Relegation to the Campeonato de Portugal
20	Fafe (R)	42	11	12	19	52	65	−13	45	Relegation to the Campeonato de Portugal
21	Freamunde (R)	42	9	13	20	39	52	−13	40	Relegation to the Campeonato de Portugal
22	Olhanense (R)	42	7	7	28	45	83	−38	28	Relegation to the Campeonato de Portugal

Source: Liga Portugal
Rules for classification: 1) Points; 2) Head-to-head points; 3) Head-to-head goal difference; 4) Head-to-head away goals scored; 5) Goal difference; 6) Matches won; 7) Goals scored; 8) Play-off.
(Note: The LPFP decided that only criteria 1, 5, 6 and 7 would be applied to establish the classification during the competition.)
(C) Champions; (O) Play-off winners; (P) Promoted; (R) Relegated

=== Positions by round ===
Team ╲ Round	1	2	3	4	5	6	7	8	9	10	11	12	13	14	15	16	17	18	19	20	21	22	23	24	25	26	27	28	29	30	31	32	33	34	35	36	37	38	39	40	41	42
Portimonense	3	1	1	1	2	1	2	1	1	1	1	1	1	1	1	1	1	1	1	1	1	1	1	1	1	1	1	1	1	1	1	1	1	1	1	1	1	1	1	1	1	1
Desportivo das Aves	2	4	7	10	8	9	4	8	5	6	4	4	2	2	2	2	2	2	2	2	2	2	2	2	2	2	2	2	2	2	2	2	2	2	2	2	2	2	2	2	2	2
União da Madeira	7	8	13	13	16	12	13	9	7	10	12	13	12	11	11	13	10	12	15	17	14	11	13	12	14	12	11	12	10	8	8	8	7	4	5	9	11	10	11	9	6	3
Benfica B	9	19	17	12	10	6	7	3	3	3	3	3	4	5	5	6	7	7	6	6	7	6	7	7	7	4	6	4	3	3	4	5	6	7	10	6	5	4	4	3	4	4
Penafiel	6	10	4	5	4	4	5	4	4	8	5	8	5	7	6	5	5	6	7	7	6	5	5	6	5	6	7	8	8	11	9	10	10	11	9	5	4	3	3	4	3	5
Académica	1	12	14	16	12	15	9	11	11	5	7	6	7	6	8	7	6	5	5	4	4	3	3	3	3	3	3	3	5	5	5	3	4	5	4	8	10	11	13	12	11	6
Braga B	10	15	16	9	7	8	8	10	10	12	14	14	14	12	12	14	17	13	11	8	8	9	8	8	8	10	8	7	7	7	7	7	9	8	11	7	6	5	5	7	5	7
Sporting da Covilhã	21	20	21	22	22	21	21	21	21	17	17	18	16	17	18	16	13	11	9	12	10	14	11	11	9	8	9	9	9	10	11	11	12	14	14	14	14	13	10	8	10	8
Varzim	22	9	11	14	20	14	15	12	12	13	15	15	17	14	14	15	18	16	12	9	9	8	6	5	6	5	4	5	4	4	3	4	3	3	3	3	3	6	6	5	7	9
Santa Clara	4	2	2	2	1	2	1	2	2	2	2	2	3	4	4	4	4	4	3	3	3	4	4	4	4	7	5	6	6	6	6	6	5	6	6	10	8	8	9	6	9	10
Vitória de Guimarães B	18	17	12	15	11	16	11	14	15	16	19	19	19	19	16	17	14	17	14	10	11	10	10	9	10	11	12	10	14	9	10	9	8	9	7	11	9	9	7	10	12	11
Porto B	16	13	5	3	6	7	12	7	9	11	10	11	9	10	10	12	12	9	13	15	12	12	15	17	18	18	17	18	17	15	15	13	14	13	12	13	12	14	12	11	8	12
Gil Vicente	5	5	9	6	13	13	14	15	14	9	9	10	11	13	13	10	15	14	17	14	17	15	12	14	12	9	10	11	11	12	12	12	11	10	8	4	7	7	8	13	13	13
Sporting CP B	17	11	15	17	19	20	20	20	17	15	13	9	10	8	7	8	8	10	10	13	15	18	18	20	20	21	21	21	21	19	16	14	13	12	13	12	13	12	14	14	14	14
Famalicão	13	3	10	8	15	11	16	16	16	18	18	16	18	15	15	11	11	15	18	16	16	17	14	16	17	15	16	13	12	13	13	15	16	18	17	18	17	18	17	17	17	15
Cova da Piedade	11	7	3	4	5	5	6	6	8	4	6	5	6	3	3	3	3	3	4	5	5	7	9	10	11	13	13	14	13	14	14	16	17	16	16	16	16	16	16	15	15	16
Académico de Viseu	19	21	18	18	14	18	19	19	20	21	16	17	15	16	17	19	19	19	19	19	18	19	17	18	19	20	19	15	15	17	18	17	15	15	15	15	15	15	15	16	16	17
Leixões	14	18	20	20	17	17	17	17	18	19	20	20	20	20	20	20	21	21	21	21	21	20	20	19	16	17	20	19	20	21	21	20	21	19	19	17	19	17	18	18	18	18
Vizela	8	6	8	11	3	3	3	5	6	7	8	7	8	9	9	9	9	8	8	11	13	13	16	13	15	14	14	16	16	18	19	18	18	17	18	19	18	19	19	20	20	19
Fafe	12	14	6	7	9	10	10	13	13	14	11	12	13	18	19	18	16	18	16	18	19	16	19	15	13	16	15	17	18	20	20	21	20	21	20	21	21	21	21	19	19	20
Freamunde	20	16	19	19	18	19	18	18	19	20	21	21	21	21	21	21	20	20	20	20	20	21	21	21	21	19	18	20	19	16	17	19	19	20	21	20	20	20	20	21	21	21
Olhanense	15	22	22	21	21	22	22	22	22	22	22	22	22	22	22	22	22	22	22	22	22	22	22	22	22	22	22	22	22	22	22	22	22	22	22	22	22	22	22	22	22	22

Updated to match(es) played on 20 May 2017. Source: Liga Portugal

=== Results ===
Home \ Away	ACA	ACV	BEN	BRA	CVP	DAV	FAF	FAM	FRM	GVI	LEI	OLH	PEN	PTM	POR	STC	SCP	SCO	UNI	VAR	VGU	VIZ
Académica			2–1	1–0				3–0		0–0	1–0	2–0	3–2	0–0		0–1	1–0		1–0	3–2		0–1
Académico de Viseu	0–0			1–1			1–0	1–1				0–1			2–1		0–1	0–1		2–2	2–1	0–1
Benfica B		2–1			1–1		0–1			1–1	1–0		2–0			3–1	0–0	2–2		1–2	3–2	
Braga B			2–1		0–1	2–2	1–1	3–0				2–2	2–1			1–2			3–1	1–1	2–0	
Cova da Piedade	1–1	1–2	1–2	1–1				1–2	1–0	1–0	1–0	3–2			1–0	1–1					2–0	0–0
Desportivo das Aves	2–0	3–2	1–2		1–0				2–1		1–1			1–0	2–1		2–0		3–1		1–0	2–2
Fafe	1–2			4–1	1–3	1–2			2–2	2–1	0–0			0–2		0–2	2–0	1–1				1–1
Famalicão			0–0			0–0	3–1		3–2	1–0	0–2	4–2	0–0	2–3		0–1	1–1		2–0	0–2		
Freamunde	0–0	1–1	0–0	0–0			1–0				0–1	1–1			3–1		2–3		0–1		0–1	1–0
Gil Vicente		0–0	1–1	2–1		0–0			0–0			2–1		0–1	1–0			0–0	2–1	1–0		1–0
Leixões		0–1		2–2	4–0			0–0		0–0			2–1	0–0	1–2	1–1				3–0		0–0
Olhanense	1–2		1–2			1–2	2–3	0–1			3–1			0–1		1–2	2–2	0–0			0–3	1–0
Penafiel	1–0	2–1			2–1	1–3	1–1		0–2	1–0		4–0		2–2				1–0		2–1	1–0	
Portimonense		3–0	3–0	1–0	1–1				3–0				3–2		3–0	1–0	4–0	2–1	2–0			2–1
Porto B	2–1	1–0	1–1	1–3		0–0	4–0	1–1			1–2	2–1	2–2					1–0	0–0	1–1		
Santa Clara	1–1	1–2				0–2		2–1	0–0	1–0			2–1		2–0			1–1		2–1	2–1	
Sporting CP B				1–2	5–1		2–4			2–2	2–1		1–2	1–2	1–2	3–1		1–1				1–2
Sporting da Covilhã	0–0			1–3	1–0	0–2		2–1	1–1		1–0	3–0	2–3				1–2		1–1	2–0		1–1
União da Madeira		2–2	1–0	1–1	0–1		0–0		2–1		2–0	3–2	0–0	3–1		1–0	0–1					
Varzim		1–1	2–0		2–1	0–2	2–1		0–0	1–1		1–0		2–2			3–0		2–1		1–1	
Vitória de Guimarães B	2–1					1–1	1–3	1–0	2–1	2–0	2–1			1–5	3–0	5–0	2–0	1–2	0–2			
Vizela		1–1	1–2	0–0		3–1		3–2		2–2			1–0		1–1	0–0			1–1	1–2	1–1	

Updated to match(es) played on 30 January 2017. Source: Liga Portugal
Legend: Blue = home team win; Yellow = draw; Red = away team win.

=== Relegation play-offs ===
27 May 2017
17:00 WEST (UTC+01:00)

Académico de Viseu	2–0	Merelinense
Lima 41'; Stéphane 71'	Report

Estádio do Fontelo, Viseu
Attendance: 3,100
Referee: Fábio Veríssimo
3 June 2017
17:00 WEST (UTC+01:00)

Merelinense	0–1	Académico de Viseu
	Report	Bura 78'

Estádio João Soares Vieira, São Pedro de Merelim
Attendance: 2,000
Referee: Bruno Paixão

Académico de Viseu won 3–0 on aggregate.

27 May 2017
17:00 WEST (UTC+01:00)

Praiense	0–1	Leixões
	Report	Salvador 84'

Estádio Municipal da Praia da Vitória, Praia da Vitória, Azores
Attendance: 600
Referee: Tiago Martins
3 June 2017
15:00 WEST (UTC+01:00)

Leixões	1–1	Praiense
Lamas 70'	Report	Arruda 29'

Estádio do Mar, Matosinhos
Attendance: 6,000
Referee: Nuno Almeida

Leixões won 2–1 on aggregate.

== Statistics ==
=== Top scorers ===
As of 23 January 2017

Rank	Player	Team	Goals
1	(Portugal) Jorge Pires	Portimonense	15
2	(Portugal) Luís Barry	Desportivo das Aves	9
3	(Portugal) Rui Costa	Varzim	8
3	(Portugal) Paulo Clemente	Santa Clara	8
3	(Brazil) Alan Júnior	Fafe	8
6	(Portugal) Xadas	Braga B	7
6	(Angola) Evandro Brandão	Fafe	7
6	(New Zealand) Tyler Boyd	Vitória de Guimarães B	7
6	(Brazil) Diego Medeiros	Famalicão	7
6	(Brazil) Paulinho	Portimonense	7

== Monthly awards ==
Month	Player of the Month	Club	Young Player of the Month	Club
August			(Portugal) Diogo Gonçalves	Benfica B
September			(Portugal) Diogo Gonçalves	Benfica B
October				
November
December				
January				
February				
March				
April				

== Attendances ==
Pos	Team	Total	High	Low	Average	Change
1	Académica	30,962	3,542	1,737	2,580	−51.8%^{1}
2	Famalicão	29,712	4,164	1,681	2,476	−11.8%
3	Vitória de Guimarães B	22,215	3,201	1,058	1,851	+43.6%
4	Portimonense	18,516	2,674	696	1,543	+27.9%
5	Varzim	13,300	2,158	746	1,209	−4.4%
6	Vizela	12,547	1,890	790	1,141	n/a^{2}
7	Santa Clara	11,748	2,060	572	1,068	+91.1%
8	Desportivo das Aves	11,597	1,700	606	966	+25.5%
9	Fafe	10,502	1,698	504	955	n/a^{2,3}
10	Cova da Piedade	10,710	1,613	372	893	n/a^{2,4}
11	Gil Vicente	9,441	1,527	442	858	−12.3%
12	Benfica B	8,533	1,331	483	776	+11.5%
13	Leixões	7,560	1,111	0	687	−43.9%^{5}
14	Académico de Viseu	6,817	847	527	620	−12.8%
15	Freamunde	7,276	890	418	606	−34.8%
16	Porto B	7,085	1,148	259	590	−18.8%
17	Penafiel	6,847	766	393	571	−0.7%
18	União da Madeira	6,225	854	352	566	−74.9%^{1}
19	Braga B	5,145	740	250	468	+2.4%
20	Olhanense	4,160	821	201	347	−34.2%
21	Sporting da Covilhã	3,583	637	137	299	−6.0%
22	Sporting CP B	2,418	338	94	220	−31.0%
	League total	246,899	4,164	0	976	+8.3%

Updated to games played on 23 January 2017
Source: Liga Portugal
Notes:
1. Played last season in Primeira Liga.
2. Played last season in Campeonato de Portugal.
3. Fafe played nine matches at Estádio Dr. Machado de Matos, with attendances of 1,698 (Freamunde), 1,470 (Santa Clara), 823 (Leixões), 751 (Portimonense), 962 (Académica), 564 (Sporting da Covilhã), 504 (Cova da Piedade), 1,075 (Vizela) and 613 (Gil Vicente) spectators; and played two matches at Estádio Municipal de Amarante, with attendances of 1,386 (Desportivo das Aves) and 656 (Braga B) spectators.
4. Cova da Piedade played one match at Caixa Futebol Campus, with an attendance of 372 (Leixões) spectators.
5. Leixões played two matches behind closed doors, against Famalicão and Porto B.
