= 2015–16 LigaPro =

26th season of second-tier football league in Portugal

LigaPro
- Season: 2015–16
- Champions: Porto B 1st title
- Promoted: Chaves; Feirense
- Relegated: Farense; Mafra; Atlético CP; Oriental; Oliveirense
- Matches: 552
- Goals: 1,266 (2.29 per match)
- Top goalscorer: Simy (20 goals)
- Biggest home win: Sporting CP B 5–0 Oliveirense (20 March 2016); Benfica B 5–0 Freamunde (14 May 2016)
- Biggest away win: Académico de Viseu 0–5 Feirense (30 April 2016)
- Highest scoring: Oriental 4–4 Vitória de Guimarães B (15 August 2015)
- Longest winning run: 6 matches Desportivo das Aves; Porto B
- Longest unbeaten run: 20 matches Penafiel
- Longest winless run: 14 matches Oriental
- Longest losing run: 8 matches Oliveirense
- Highest attendance: 7,900; Chaves 1–1 Farense (30 April 2016)
- Lowest attendance: 115; Sporting da Covilhã 0–3 Desportivo das Aves (10 January 2016)

The 2015–16 LigaPro (also known as Ledman LigaPro for sponsorship reasons) was the 26th season of Portuguese football's second-tier league, and the first season under the current LigaPro title. A total of 24 teams competed in this division, including five reserve sides from top-flight Primeira Liga teams. The season began on 7 August 2015 and concluded on 14 May 2016.

Porto B were crowned champions, becoming the first reserve team to win the second-tier championship title in Portugal. Chaves and Feirense finished in the second and third places, respectively, securing promotion to the 2016–17 Primeira Liga. Farense, Mafra, Atlético CP, Oriental and Oliveirense were relegated to the 2016–17 Campeonato de Portugal.

== Teams ==
A total of 24 teams contested the league, including 19 sides from the 2014–15 season, two teams relegated from the 2014–15 Primeira Liga (Gil Vicente and Penafiel) and three promoted from the 2014–15 Campeonato Nacional de Seniores (Mafra, Famalicão and Varzim).

Other team changes compared to the previous season included the promotion of Tondela and União da Madeira to the 2015–16 Primeira Liga, and the relegation of Marítimo B, Trofense and Beira-Mar to the 2015–16 Campeonato de Portugal.

On 19 June 2015, the LPFP announced that five teams, instead of three, would be relegated to the third tier to reduce the number of teams in the 2016–17 LigaPro season to 22.

=== Stadia and locations ===
Location of teams in 2015–16 LigaPro (Mainland)
Location of teams in 2015–16 LigaPro (Azores)

| Team | Location | Stadium | Capacity | 2014–15 finish |
|---|---|---|---|---|
| Académico de Viseu | Viseu | Estádio do Fontelo | 7,744 | 12th |
| Atlético CP | Lisbon | Estádio da Tapadinha | 2,500 | 22nd |
| Benfica B | Lisbon | Caixa Futebol Campus | 2,720 | 6th |
| Braga B | Braga | Estádio 1º de Maio | 28,000 | 21st |
| Chaves | Chaves | Estádio Municipal Eng. Manuel Branco Teixeira | 8,870 | 3rd |
| Desportivo das Aves | Vila das Aves | Estádio do CD Aves | 5,441 | 18th |
| Famalicão | Vila Nova de Famalicão | Estádio Municipal 22 de Junho | 5,300 | 2nd (CNS) |
| Farense | Faro | Estádio de São Luís | 7,000 | 11th |
| Feirense | Santa Maria da Feira | Estádio Marcolino de Castro | 5,600 | 7th |
| Freamunde | Freamunde | Complexo Desportivo do SC Freamunde | 3,919 | 8th |
| Gil Vicente | Barcelos | Estádio Cidade de Barcelos | 12,046 | 17th (PL) |
| Leixões | Matosinhos | Estádio do Mar | 9,766 | 20th |
| Mafra | Mafra | Parque Desportivo Municipal de Mafra | 1,200 | 1st (CNS) |
| Olhanense | Olhão | Estádio José Arcanjo | 5,661 | 16th |
| Oliveirense | Oliveira de Azeméis | Estádio Carlos Osório | 1,435 | 17th |
| Oriental | Lisbon | Campo Eng. Carlos Salema | 1,860 | 15th |
| Penafiel | Penafiel | Estádio Municipal 25 de Abril | 5,320 | 18th (PL) |
| Portimonense | Portimão | Estádio Municipal de Portimão | 5,950 | 14th |
| Porto B | Porto | Estádio Municipal Jorge Sampaio | 8,270 | 13th |
| Santa Clara | Ponta Delgada | Estádio de São Miguel | 13,277 | 19th |
| Sporting CP B | Lisbon | CGD Stadium Aurélio Pereira | 1,180 | 5th |
| Sporting da Covilhã | Covilhã | Estádio Municipal José dos Santos Pinto | 2,055 | 4th |
| Varzim | Póvoa de Varzim | Estádio do Varzim SC | 7,280 | 3rd (CNS) |
| Vitória de Guimarães B | Guimarães | Estádio D. Afonso Henriques | 30,000 | 9th |

=== Personnel and sponsors ===
| Team | Head coach | Kit manufacturer | Sponsors |
|---|---|---|---|
| Académico de Viseu | (Portugal) Jorge Casquilha | Macron | Palácio do Gelo |
| Atlético CP | (Canada) Nilton Terroso | Givova | |
| Benfica B | (Portugal) Hélder Cristóvão | adidas | Fly Emirates |
| Braga B | (Portugal) Abel Ferreira | Macron | AXA |
| Chaves | (Portugal) Vítor Oliveira | Lacatoni | Hotel Forte de São Francisco |
| Desportivo das Aves | (Portugal) Ulisses Morais | Lacatoni | WoWalBo |
| Famalicão | (Portugal) Daniel Ramos | Lacatoni | Amob |
| Farense | (Portugal) Antero Afonso (caretaker) | Macron | Couteiro Mor |
| Feirense | (Portugal) José Mota | adidas | Mestre da Cor |
| Freamunde | (Portugal) Carlos Brito | adidas | LGSP Sports |
| Gil Vicente | (Portugal) Nandinho | Macron | Barcelos / Crédito Agrícola |
| Leixões | (Portugal) Pedro Miguel | Luanvi | Mar à Mesa |
| Mafra | (Portugal) Jorge Paixão | Lacatoni | Moticristo |
| Olhanense | (Italy) Cristiano Bacci | Macron | OLX |
| Oliveirense | (Portugal) Bruno Sousa (caretaker) | Macron | Grupo Simoldes |
| Oriental | (Portugal) Jorge Andrade | COL | |
| Penafiel | (Portugal) Paulo Alves | Macron | Restradas |
| Portimonense | (Portugal) José Augusto | Mizuno | VisitPortimão.com |
| Porto B | (Portugal) Luís Castro | New Balance | |
| Santa Clara | (Portugal) Carlos Pinto | Nike | Açoreana Seguros |
| Sporting CP B | (Portugal) João de Deus | Macron | |
| Sporting da Covilhã | (Portugal) Francisco Chaló | Lacatoni | Natura / MB Hotels |
| Varzim | (Portugal) Quim Berto | Stadio | Carnes São José |
| Vitória de Guimarães B | (Portugal) Vítor Campelos | Nike | Banco BIC |

=== Coaching changes ===
| Team | Outgoing head coach | Manner of departure | Date of vacancy | Position in table | Incoming head coach | Date of appointment |
|---|---|---|---|---|---|---|
| Leixões | (Portugal) Horácio Gonçalves | Mutual agreement | 12 May 2015 | Pre-season | (Portugal) Manuel Monteiro | 22 June 2015 |
| Chaves | (Portugal) Carlos Pinto | Contract expired | 24 May 2015 | Pre-season | (Portugal) Vítor Oliveira | 10 June 2015 |
| Desportivo das Aves | (Portugal) Emanuel Simões | Contract expired | 24 May 2015 | Pre-season | (Portugal) Carlos Pinto | 22 June 2015 |
| Santa Clara | (Portugal) Filipe Gouveia | Contract expired | 24 May 2015 | Pre-season | (Portugal) Horácio Gonçalves | 1 June 2015 |
| Gil Vicente | (Portugal) José Mota | Contract expired | 26 May 2015 | Pre-season | (Portugal) Nandinho | 28 May 2015 |
| Farense | (Portugal) Abel Xavier | Resigned | 28 May 2015 | Pre-season | (Portugal) Jorge Paixão | 4 June 2015 |
| Vitória de Guimarães B | (Portugal) Armando Evangelista | Took over Vitória's first team | 15 June 2015 | Pre-season | (Portugal) Vítor Campelos | 18 June 2015 |
| Santa Clara | (Portugal) Horácio Gonçalves | | 7 July 2015 | Pre-season | (Portugal) Filipe Gouveia | 7 July 2015 |
| Desportivo das Aves | (Portugal) Carlos Pinto | Mutual agreement | 10 July 2015 | Pre-season | (Portugal) Abel Xavier | 10 July 2015 |
| Freamunde | (Portugal) Filó | Resigned | 16 August 2015 | 18th | (Portugal) Carlos Pinto | 16 August 2015 |
| Desportivo das Aves | (Portugal) Abel Xavier | Sacked | 4 September 2015 | 23rd | (Portugal) Ulisses Morais | 5 September 2015 |
| Santa Clara | (Portugal) Filipe Gouveia | Signed for Académica | 24 September 2015 | 9th | (Portugal) Hugo Relvas (caretaker) | 24 September 2015 |
| Oliveirense | (Portugal) Artur Marques | Resigned | 29 September 2015 | 24th | (Portugal) Bruno Sousa (caretaker) | 29 September 2015 |
| Santa Clara | (Portugal) Hugo Relvas (caretaker) | Ended caretaking role | 5 October 2015 | 13th | (Portugal) Fernando Valente | 5 October 2015 |
| Varzim | (Portugal) Quim Berto | Mutual agreement | 21 October 2015 | 19th | (Portugal) Vitoriano Ramos (caretaker) | 21 October 2015 |
| Varzim | (Portugal) Vitoriano Ramos (caretaker) | Ended caretaking role | 25 October 2015 | 14th | (Portugal) Capucho | 25 October 2015 |
| Leixões | (Portugal) Manuel Monteiro | Mutual agreement | 23 November 2015 | 22nd | (Portugal) Pedro Miguel | 25 November 2015 |
| Farense | (Portugal) Jorge Paixão | Mutual agreement | 30 November 2015 | 11th | (Portugal) Antero Afonso (caretaker) | 30 November 2015 |
| Penafiel | (Portugal) Carlos Brito | Resigned | 2 December 2015 | 18th | (Portugal) Paulo Alves | 3 December 2015 |
| Farense | (Portugal) Antero Afonso (caretaker) | Ended caretaking role | 14 December 2015 | 13th | (Portugal) Horácio Gonçalves | 14 December 2015 |
| Mafra | (Portugal) Jorge Neves | Sacked | 21 December 2015 | 21st | (Portugal) Jorge Paixão | 30 December 2015 |
| Oliveirense | (Portugal) Bruno Sousa (caretaker) | Ended caretaking role | 18 January 2016 | 24th | (Portugal) João Bastos | 18 January 2016 |
| Académico de Viseu | (Portugal) Ricardo Chéu | Sacked | 8 February 2016 | 12th | (Portugal) Tony (caretaker) | 8 February 2016 |
| Académico de Viseu | (Portugal) Tony (caretaker) | Ended caretaking role | 15 February 2016 | 13th | (Portugal) Bruno Ribeiro | 15 February 2016 |
| Freamunde | (Portugal) Carlos Pinto | Sacked | 17 February 2016 | 6th | (Portugal) Carlos Brito | 19 February 2016 |
| Oriental | (Portugal) João Barbosa | Mutual agreement | 18 February 2016 | 23rd | (Portugal) João Mendes (caretaker) | 19 February 2016 |
| Oriental | (Portugal) João Mendes (caretaker) | Ended caretaking role | 21 February 2016 | 23rd | (Portugal) Litos | 21 February 2016 |
| Santa Clara | (Portugal) Fernando Valente | Mutual agreement | 24 February 2016 | 22nd | (Portugal) Carlos Pinto | 24 February 2016 |
| Atlético CP | (Portugal) Pedro Hipólito | Sacked | 25 February 2016 | 15th | (Portugal) Carlos Pereira (caretaker) | 25 February 2016 |
| Atlético CP | (Portugal) Carlos Pereira (caretaker) | Ended caretaking role | 1 March 2016 | 15th | (Canada) Nilton Terroso | 1 March 2016 |
| Académico de Viseu | (Portugal) Bruno Ribeiro | Resigned | 10 March 2016 | 17th | (Portugal) Tiago Castro (caretaker) | 10 March 2016 |
| Académico de Viseu | (Portugal) Tiago Castro (caretaker) | Ended caretaking role | 13 March 2016 | 18th | (Portugal) Jorge Casquilha | 13 March 2016 |
| Oriental | (Portugal) Litos | Resigned | 16 March 2016 | 23rd | (Portugal) João Mendes (caretaker) | 18 March 2016 |
| Oriental | (Portugal) João Mendes (caretaker) | Ended caretaking role | 21 March 2016 | 23rd | (Portugal) Jorge Andrade | 21 March 2016 |
| Oliveirense | (Portugal) João Bastos | Mutual agreement | 22 March 2016 | 24th | (Portugal) Bruno Sousa (caretaker) | 22 March 2016 |
| Feirense | (Portugal) Pepa | Sacked | 24 March 2016 | 5th | (Portugal) José Mota | 25 March 2016 |
| Farense | (Portugal) Horácio Gonçalves | Mutual agreement | 7 April 2016 | 19th | (Portugal) Antero Afonso (caretaker) | 7 April 2016 |

== Season summary ==
=== League table ===
| Pos | Team | Pld | W | D | L | GF | GA | GD | Pts | Promotion or Relegation |
|---|---|---|---|---|---|---|---|---|---|---|
| 1 | Porto B (C) | 46 | 26 | 8 | 12 | 84 | 52 | +32 | 86 | Ineligible for promotion |
| 2 | Chaves (P) | 46 | 21 | 18 | 7 | 60 | 39 | +21 | 81 | Promotion to Primeira Liga |
| 3 | Feirense (P) | 46 | 21 | 15 | 10 | 55 | 38 | +17 | 78 | Promotion to Primeira Liga |
| 4 | Portimonense | 46 | 20 | 18 | 8 | 57 | 45 | +12 | 78 | |
| 5 | Freamunde | 46 | 20 | 14 | 12 | 52 | 36 | +16 | 74 | |
| 6 | Famalicão | 46 | 18 | 18 | 10 | 64 | 51 | +13 | 72 | |
| 7 | Olhanense | 46 | 19 | 12 | 15 | 42 | 39 | +3 | 69 | |
| 8 | Desportivo das Aves | 46 | 19 | 10 | 17 | 58 | 48 | +10 | 67 | |
| 9 | Varzim | 46 | 17 | 14 | 15 | 51 | 48 | +3 | 65 | |
| 10 | Sporting CP B | 46 | 18 | 11 | 17 | 61 | 59 | +2 | 65 | Ineligible for promotion |
| 11 | Gil Vicente | 46 | 16 | 14 | 16 | 58 | 56 | +2 | 62 | |
| 12 | Penafiel | 46 | 13 | 22 | 11 | 49 | 46 | +3 | 61 | |
| 13 | Vitória de Guimarães B | 46 | 16 | 12 | 18 | 60 | 67 | −7 | 60 | Ineligible for promotion |
| 14 | Sporting da Covilhã | 46 | 13 | 19 | 14 | 45 | 48 | −3 | 58 | |
| 15 | Braga B | 46 | 15 | 12 | 19 | 47 | 54 | −7 | 57 | Ineligible for promotion |
| 16 | Santa Clara | 46 | 15 | 12 | 19 | 49 | 52 | −3 | 57 | |
| 17 | Académico de Viseu | 46 | 13 | 17 | 16 | 46 | 60 | −14 | 56 | |
| 18 | Leixões | 46 | 14 | 13 | 19 | 45 | 56 | −11 | 55 | |
| 19 | Benfica B | 46 | 15 | 10 | 21 | 59 | 64 | −5 | 55 | Ineligible for promotion |
| 20 | Farense (R) | 46 | 15 | 11 | 20 | 49 | 56 | −7 | 54 (Note: Farense were deducted a total of 2 points for fielding an ineligible player.) | Relegation to Campeonato de Portugal |
| 21 | Mafra (R) | 46 | 12 | 18 | 16 | 37 | 40 | −3 | 54 | Relegation to Campeonato de Portugal |
| 22 | Atlético CP (R) | 46 | 12 | 15 | 19 | 49 | 56 | −7 | 51 | Relegation to Campeonato de Portugal |
| 23 | Oriental (R) | 46 | 9 | 14 | 23 | 47 | 67 | −20 | 41 | Relegation to Campeonato de Portugal |
| 24 | Oliveirense (R) | 46 | 6 | 11 | 29 | 42 | 89 | −47 | 29 | Relegation to Campeonato de Portugal |

Source: LPFP
Rules for classification: 1) Points; 2) Head-to-head points; 3) Head-to-head goal difference; 4) Head-to-head away goals scored; 5) Goal difference; 6) Matches won; 7) Goals scored; 8) Play-off.
(Note: LPFP decided that only criteria 1, 5, 6 and 7 would be applied to establish the classification during the competition.)
(C) Champions; (P) Promoted; (R) Relegated

=== Positions by round ===
| Team ╲ Round | 1 | 2 | 3 | 4 | 5 | 6 | 7 | 8 | 9 | 10 | 11 | 12 | 13 | 14 | 15 | 16 | 17 | 18 | 19 | 20 | 21 | 22 | 23 | 24 | 25 | 26 | 27 | 28 | 29 | 30 | 31 | 32 | 33 | 34 | 35 | 36 | 37 | 38 | 39 | 40 | 41 | 42 | 43 | 44 | 45 | 46 |
|---|---|---|---|---|---|---|---|---|---|---|---|---|---|---|---|---|---|---|---|---|---|---|---|---|---|---|---|---|---|---|---|---|---|---|---|---|---|---|---|---|---|---|---|---|---|---|
| Porto B | 18 | 11 | 5 | 10 | 7 | 3 | 1 | 1 | 1 | 1 | 1 | 1 | 1 | 1 | 1 | 1 | 1 | 1 | 1 | 1 | 1 | 1 | 1 | 1 | 1 | 1 | 1 | 1 | 1 | 1 | 1 | 1 | 1 | 1 | 1 | 1 | 1 | 1 | 1 | 1 | 1 | 1 | 1 | 1 | 1 | 1 |
| Chaves | 9 | 7 | 8 | 11 | 1 | 4 | 3 | 4 | 4 | 2 | 4 | 5 | 5 | 3 | 5 | 3 | 4 | 4 | 4 | 4 | 3 | 3 | 2 | 2 | 2 | 3 | 3 | 2 | 2 | 3 | 2 | 2 | 2 | 3 | 2 | 2 | 2 | 2 | 2 | 2 | 2 | 2 | 2 | 2 | 2 | 2 |
| Feirense | 14 | 14 | 21 | 20 | 20 | 20 | 20 | 21 | 16 | 19 | 15 | 10 | 6 | 7 | 6 | 4 | 2 | 2 | 2 | 2 | 2 | 2 | 4 | 3 | 5 | 5 | 4 | 3 | 3 | 2 | 3 | 4 | 4 | 4 | 3 | 3 | 5 | 6 | 6 | 6 | 4 | 6 | 5 | 4 | 3 | 3 |
| Portimonense | 3 | 10 | 12 | 14 | 8 | 8 | 8 | 10 | 6 | 4 | 2 | 2 | 2 | 4 | 4 | 7 | 5 | 5 | 5 | 5 | 7 | 8 | 7 | 6 | 6 | 6 | 6 | 5 | 8 | 5 | 5 | 5 | 7 | 6 | 5 | 6 | 6 | 5 | 5 | 3 | 3 | 3 | 3 | 3 | 4 | 4 |
| Freamunde | 22 | 18 | 20 | 22 | 18 | 12 | 14 | 17 | 20 | 20 | 20 | 16 | 13 | 12 | 7 | 5 | 7 | 7 | 9 | 7 | 5 | 4 | 3 | 4 | 4 | 2 | 2 | 4 | 5 | 6 | 6 | 6 | 5 | 5 | 6 | 7 | 4 | 4 | 4 | 4 | 5 | 4 | 4 | 5 | 5 | 5 |
| Famalicão | 2 | 2 | 4 | 2 | 5 | 10 | 11 | 13 | 15 | 18 | 17 | 12 | 8 | 13 | 11 | 8 | 6 | 8 | 6 | 9 | 6 | 9 | 9 | 11 | 9 | 8 | 8 | 8 | 7 | 4 | 4 | 3 | 3 | 2 | 4 | 4 | 3 | 3 | 3 | 5 | 6 | 5 | 6 | 6 | 6 | 6 |
| Olhanense | 13 | 20 | 13 | 7 | 15 | 15 | 18 | 12 | 8 | 14 | 11 | 11 | 19 | 19 | 17 | 14 | 15 | 10 | 7 | 6 | 10 | 11 | 12 | 9 | 11 | 11 | 14 | 10 | 12 | 11 | 11 | 10 | 11 | 11 | 9 | 10 | 10 | 10 | 10 | 11 | 12 | 11 | 11 | 9 | 8 | 7 |
| Desportivo das Aves | 20 | 16 | 19 | 23 | 23 | 23 | 21 | 16 | 18 | 8 | 9 | 7 | 10 | 5 | 3 | 6 | 8 | 9 | 13 | 14 | 16 | 14 | 13 | 10 | 8 | 7 | 7 | 6 | 4 | 7 | 8 | 8 | 8 | 8 | 8 | 8 | 8 | 9 | 9 | 8 | 7 | 8 | 7 | 7 | 7 | 8 |
| Varzim | 19 | 17 | 14 | 17 | 14 | 19 | 10 | 8 | 12 | 16 | 19 | 14 | 17 | 16 | 9 | 15 | 14 | 16 | 18 | 18 | 18 | 15 | 16 | 15 | 16 | 12 | 13 | 13 | 9 | 10 | 10 | 9 | 10 | 9 | 10 | 9 | 9 | 7 | 7 | 7 | 10 | 9 | 10 | 11 | 9 | 9 |
| Sporting CP B | 17 | 23 | 15 | 8 | 9 | 5 | 2 | 2 | 2 | 3 | 5 | 3 | 3 | 2 | 2 | 2 | 3 | 3 | 3 | 3 | 4 | 5 | 8 | 8 | 10 | 10 | 11 | 14 | 10 | 13 | 12 | 14 | 15 | 14 | 13 | 13 | 11 | 11 | 11 | 9 | 9 | 7 | 8 | 8 | 10 | 10 |
| Gil Vicente | 11 | 19 | 9 | 12 | 19 | 11 | 12 | 15 | 13 | 6 | 10 | 15 | 12 | 15 | 16 | 11 | 10 | 6 | 8 | 10 | 8 | 6 | 5 | 5 | 3 | 4 | 5 | 7 | 6 | 8 | 7 | 7 | 6 | 7 | 7 | 5 | 7 | 8 | 8 | 10 | 8 | 10 | 9 | 10 | 11 | 11 |
| Penafiel | 16 | 22 | 22 | 18 | 16 | 14 | 17 | 14 | 9 | 9 | 12 | 13 | 11 | 14 | 18 | 18 | 19 | 18 | 21 | 21 | 19 | 19 | 19 | 20 | 19 | 18 | 19 | 18 | 19 | 21 | 19 | 17 | 14 | 13 | 14 | 14 | 13 | 12 | 12 | 13 | 13 | 12 | 12 | 12 | 12 | 12 |
| Vitória de Guimarães B | 23 | 15 | 18 | 19 | 17 | 17 | 15 | 19 | 21 | 22 | 21 | 19 | 16 | 10 | 14 | 16 | 17 | 17 | 20 | 17 | 14 | 13 | 14 | 17 | 15 | 17 | 20 | 21 | 17 | 18 | 20 | 21 | 21 | 19 | 19 | 17 | 20 | 17 | 18 | 16 | 17 | 15 | 15 | 16 | 15 | 13 |
| Sporting da Covilhã | 7 | 13 | 17 | 21 | 22 | 22 | 23 | 23 | 19 | 15 | 18 | 20 | 21 | 21 | 19 | 19 | 20 | 19 | 15 | 19 | 20 | 20 | 20 | 21 | 21 | 20 | 18 | 19 | 15 | 15 | 13 | 12 | 12 | 12 | 12 | 12 | 14 | 14 | 15 | 15 | 14 | 14 | 14 | 14 | 13 | 14 |
| Braga B | 8 | 6 | 7 | 3 | 2 | 1 | 4 | 3 | 5 | 7 | 8 | 6 | 9 | 9 | 13 | 17 | 16 | 12 | 11 | 8 | 9 | 7 | 6 | 7 | 7 | 9 | 9 | 9 | 11 | 9 | 9 | 11 | 9 | 10 | 11 | 11 | 12 | 13 | 13 | 12 | 11 | 13 | 13 | 13 | 16 | 15 |
| Santa Clara | 6 | 12 | 6 | 9 | 4 | 9 | 13 | 9 | 11 | 13 | 14 | 18 | 20 | 20 | 21 | 21 | 18 | 20 | 17 | 16 | 17 | 18 | 15 | 14 | 14 | 16 | 17 | 17 | 18 | 19 | 22 | 18 | 19 | 20 | 21 | 22 | 22 | 22 | 21 | 21 | 18 | 19 | 17 | 15 | 14 | 16 |
| Académico de Viseu | 4 | 1 | 3 | 5 | 3 | 7 | 6 | 5 | 10 | 10 | 6 | 8 | 7 | 11 | 15 | 10 | 9 | 13 | 12 | 11 | 12 | 12 | 10 | 13 | 13 | 15 | 12 | 12 | 13 | 12 | 14 | 13 | 17 | 17 | 18 | 19 | 16 | 18 | 17 | 19 | 21 | 16 | 16 | 20 | 18 | 17 |
| Leixões | 15 | 21 | 23 | 16 | 21 | 21 | 22 | 22 | 23 | 21 | 23 | 23 | 22 | 23 | 23 | 22 | 23 | 22 | 22 | 22 | 22 | 22 | 22 | 18 | 18 | 19 | 16 | 16 | 20 | 16 | 17 | 16 | 18 | 18 | 16 | 16 | 19 | 20 | 22 | 22 | 19 | 21 | 18 | 19 | 20 | 18 |
| Benfica B | 10 | 8 | 11 | 6 | 13 | 6 | 9 | 7 | 7 | 11 | 7 | 9 | 14 | 8 | 12 | 9 | 13 | 15 | 14 | 15 | 15 | 17 | 18 | 19 | 20 | 21 | 21 | 20 | 21 | 17 | 18 | 20 | 20 | 21 | 22 | 21 | 21 | 21 | 20 | 18 | 20 | 20 | 21 | 18 | 19 | 19 |
| Farense | 21 | 9 | 16 | 15 | 12 | 13 | 7 | 11 | 14 | 12 | 13 | 17 | 15 | 17 | 10 | 12 | 11 | 14 | 16 | 13 | 13 | 16 | 17 | 16 | 17 | 14 | 15 | 15 | 16 | 20 | 16 | 19 | 16 | 16 | 17 | 20 | 18 | 19 | 19 | 20 | 22 | 22 | 22 | 22 | 22 | 20 |
| Mafra | 12 | 5 | 2 | 4 | 11 | 16 | 19 | 18 | 17 | 17 | 16 | 21 | 18 | 18 | 20 | 20 | 21 | 21 | 19 | 20 | 21 | 21 | 21 | 22 | 22 | 22 | 22 | 22 | 22 | 22 | 21 | 22 | 22 | 22 | 20 | 18 | 17 | 16 | 16 | 17 | 16 | 18 | 20 | 17 | 17 | 21 |
| Atlético CP | 5 | 3 | 1 | 1 | 6 | 2 | 5 | 6 | 3 | 5 | 3 | 4 | 4 | 6 | 8 | 13 | 12 | 11 | 10 | 12 | 11 | 10 | 11 | 12 | 12 | 13 | 10 | 11 | 14 | 14 | 15 | 15 | 13 | 15 | 15 | 15 | 15 | 15 | 14 | 14 | 15 | 17 | 19 | 21 | 21 | 22 |
| Oriental | 1 | 4 | 10 | 13 | 10 | 18 | 16 | 20 | 22 | 23 | 22 | 22 | 23 | 22 | 22 | 23 | 22 | 23 | 23 | 23 | 23 | 24 | 23 | 23 | 23 | 23 | 23 | 23 | 23 | 23 | 23 | 23 | 23 | 23 | 23 | 23 | 23 | 23 | 23 | 23 | 23 | 23 | 23 | 23 | 23 | 23 |
| Oliveirense | 24 | 24 | 24 | 24 | 24 | 24 | 24 | 24 | 24 | 24 | 24 | 24 | 24 | 24 | 24 | 24 | 24 | 24 | 24 | 24 | 24 | 23 | 24 | 24 | 24 | 24 | 24 | 24 | 24 | 24 | 24 | 24 | 24 | 24 | 24 | 24 | 24 | 24 | 24 | 24 | 24 | 24 | 24 | 24 | 24 | 24 |

Source: LPFP

=== Results ===
| Home \ Away | ACV | ACP | BEN | BRA | CHA | DAV | FAM | FAR | FEI | FRM | GVI | LEI | MAF | OLH | OLI | ORI | PEN | PTM | POR | STC | SCP | SCO | VAR | VGU |
|---|---|---|---|---|---|---|---|---|---|---|---|---|---|---|---|---|---|---|---|---|---|---|---|---|
| Académico de Viseu | | 0–1 | 2–2 | 1–1 | 1–1 | 3–2 | 0–1 | 1–0 | 0–5 | 1–0 | 1–1 | 1–1 | 2–1 | 0–0 | 2–1 | 0–2 | 0–2 | 0–1 | 1–3 | 1–0 | 1–2 | 2–0 | 4–2 | 2–1 |
| Atlético CP | 1–1 | | 3–2 | 1–2 | 0–1 | 0–1 | 1–0 | 0–1 | 1–1 | 1–0 | 0–1 | 0–1 | 1–1 | 1–0 | 4–1 | 2–3 | 1–2 | 2–2 | 2–3 | 0–1 | 1–3 | 1–1 | 3–1 | 3–3 |
| Benfica B | 2–0 | 1–1 | | 1–1 | 0–1 | 2–1 | 1–3 | 3–0 | 1–2 | 5–0 | 1–0 | 0–2 | 1–2 | 2–3 | 1–0 | 2–1 | 1–0 | 3–2 | 0–3 | 0–0 | 1–0 | 2–2 | 1–1 | 3–3 |
| Braga B | 0–0 | 0–0 | 0–2 | | 1–3 | 1–0 | 2–0 | 2–1 | 1–1 | 0–1 | 1–0 | 0–1 | 1–0 | 0–1 | 2–2 | 0–0 | 0–1 | 2–3 | 2–0 | 2–0 | 1–1 | 0–2 | 0–2 | 2–1 |
| Chaves | 2–1 | 1–0 | 1–1 | 2–2 | | 2–1 | 0–0 | 1–1 | 1–1 | 1–0 | 4–0 | 3–0 | 1–0 | 0–0 | 1–1 | 1–1 | 1–1 | 2–2 | 2–2 | 1–0 | 1–0 | 1–0 | 1–0 | 1–1 |
| Desportivo das Aves | 1–2 | 2–0 | 3–2 | 2–0 | 2–1 | | 2–0 | 2–0 | 1–0 | 1–1 | 2–2 | 1–0 | 1–1 | 1–0 | 1–1 | 0–1 | 0–1 | 1–1 | 0–0 | 1–3 | 3–0 | 0–1 | 2–2 | 0–1 |
| Famalicão | 0–0 | 2–2 | 2–3 | 1–2 | 4–3 | 3–2 | | 2–1 | 1–0 | 1–3 | 2–2 | 3–0 | 4–1 | 1–0 | 2–0 | 2–2 | 1–1 | 1–1 | 2–4 | 2–0 | 1–1 | 1–1 | 0–1 | 3–3 |
| Farense | 1–0 | 2–1 | 1–0 | 3–2 | 1–1 | 2–1 | 2–2 | | 1–1 | 0–1 | 0–2 | 3–0 | 0–0 | 1–2 | 2–0 | 1–0 | 0–0 | 1–2 | 1–2 | 1–0 | 3–0 | 0–2 | 0–0 | 2–0 |
| Feirense | 2–0 | 1–2 | 1–0 | 1–2 | 0–1 | 2–2 | 2–1 | 1–0 | | 0–2 | 3–2 | 2–1 | 0–2 | 1–0 | 3–1 | 2–2 | 1–0 | 2–1 | 1–0 | 1–0 | 2–0 | 1–1 | 1–0 | 1–1 |
| Freamunde | 0–0 | 0–0 | 1–0 | 2–1 | 2–1 | 1–1 | 0–0 | 3–0 | 1–1 | | 3–0 | 0–0 | 1–0 | 3–1 | 1–0 | 0–0 | 1–0 | 1–1 | 1–2 | 2–1 | 1–2 | 1–0 | 1–1 | 3–0 |
| Gil Vicente | 1–1 | 0–2 | 3–2 | 4–1 | 1–1 | 1–0 | 1–1 | 2–3 | 1–0 | 0–0 | | 2–0 | 1–1 | 3–0 | 4–0 | 1–0 | 1–0 | 2–2 | 1–2 | 2–2 | 1–1 | 4–0 | 1–1 | 2–1 |
| Leixões | 1–1 | 0–1 | 2–0 | 2–3 | 1–2 | 3–1 | 0–0 | 1–1 | 0–1 | 0–2 | 2–1 | | 1–1 | 0–2 | 3–1 | 3–3 | 1–0 | 0–1 | 2–0 | 2–2 | 3–1 | 2–2 | 0–4 | 1–1 |
| Mafra | 1–1 | 0–0 | 0–0 | 1–0 | 0–1 | 1–1 | 0–0 | 1–2 | 1–1 | 2–1 | 0–1 | 1–0 | | 1–0 | 2–0 | 1–0 | 0–0 | 0–0 | 2–1 | 0–0 | 2–0 | 1–2 | 1–1 | 1–1 |
| Olhanense | 2–2 | 1–0 | 1–1 | 2–0 | 1–0 | 0–0 | 0–1 | 1–0 | 0–0 | 3–2 | 0–0 | 0–2 | 2–1 | | 2–0 | 1–0 | 2–1 | 0–1 | 0–2 | 1–0 | 1–0 | 2–1 | 1–1 | 3–1 |
| Oliveirense | 0–2 | 1–1 | 1–2 | 0–1 | 0–3 | 2–4 | 2–2 | 3–1 | 3–2 | 0–0 | 1–2 | 1–2 | 2–1 | 1–2 | | 0–3 | 1–1 | 0–2 | 0–1 | 1–2 | 1–2 | 1–1 | 1–0 | 0–1 |
| Oriental | 1–1 | 2–1 | 1–3 | 0–0 | 1–2 | 0–2 | 0–1 | 1–3 | 0–2 | 2–1 | 1–1 | 0–1 | 0–1 | 0–0 | 5–2 | | 0–1 | 1–2 | 2–1 | 2–0 | 0–4 | 0–0 | 0–2 | 4–4 |
| Penafiel | 0–0 | 1–1 | 1–0 | 0–0 | 1–0 | 0–2 | 1–1 | 0–0 | 0–0 | 1–2 | 1–0 | 0–0 | 1–1 | 1–1 | 2–2 | 4–2 | | 1–1 | 1–1 | 2–1 | 2–2 | 2–2 | 1–0 | 3–0 |
| Portimonense | 1–2 | 1–2 | 1–0 | 1–5 | 1–1 | 0–1 | 0–3 | 1–0 | 2–2 | 0–0 | 1–0 | 1–1 | 2–0 | 1–0 | 1–2 | 1–0 | 1–1 | | 2–1 | 1–0 | 2–0 | 1–1 | 2–0 | 3–1 |
| Porto B | 4–0 | 1–0 | 3–1 | 2–0 | 0–0 | 0–1 | 1–2 | 4–3 | 2–0 | 2–1 | 4–2 | 0–2 | 2–0 | 0–0 | 2–2 | 2–1 | 3–1 | 1–2 | | 4–2 | 4–0 | 2–1 | 4–0 | 5–2 |
| Santa Clara | 0–1 | 2–2 | 2–0 | 1–0 | 2–2 | 1–2 | 1–0 | 2–0 | 0–0 | 2–1 | 0–2 | 2–0 | 1–0 | 1–0 | 0–0 | 2–2 | 3–2 | 1–1 | 1–2 | | 2–3 | 2–2 | 2–0 | 2–0 |
| Sporting CP B | 4–2 | 0–1 | 2–1 | 0–1 | 2–0 | 1–0 | 0–0 | 1–0 | 0–0 | 1–1 | 2–0 | 3–1 | 1–1 | 1–3 | 5–0 | 3–0 | 4–2 | 1–1 | 1–1 | 2–1 | | 1–3 | 0–0 | 2–4 |
| Sporting da Covilhã | 2–2 | 3–0 | 0–2 | 1–0 | 0–1 | 0–3 | 0–1 | 1–1 | 0–2 | 0–2 | 3–0 | 0–0 | 1–0 | 0–0 | 2–1 | 1–0 | 2–2 | 0–0 | 0–0 | 1–0 | 0–1 | | 2–1 | 0–1 |
| Varzim | 2–1 | 3–2 | 2–1 | 1–1 | 3–0 | 1–0 | 1–2 | 2–2 | 0–1 | 0–2 | 2–0 | 1–0 | 0–3 | 3–1 | 0–1 | 2–0 | 1–1 | 0–0 | 2–0 | 1–1 | 2–1 | 0–0 | | 1–0 |
| Vitória de Guimarães B | 2–0 | 0–0 | 3–0 | 3–2 | 0–3 | 2–0 | 1–2 | 2–1 | 0–1 | 0–0 | 1–0 | 1–0 | 1–0 | 1–0 | 4–2 | 1–1 | 2–3 | 0–1 | 3–1 | 0–1 | 1–0 | 1–1 | 0–1 | |

Source: LPFP
Legend: Blue = home team win; Yellow = draw; Red = away team win.

== Statistics ==
=== Top scorers ===
| Rank | Player | Team | Goals |
|---|---|---|---|
| 1 | (Nigeria) Simy | Gil Vicente | 20 |
| 2 | (Brazil) Platiny | Feirense | 17 |
| 3 | (Brazil) Leandro Souza | Famalicão | 14 |
| 3 | (Portugal) André Silva | Porto B | 14 |
| 3 | (Nigeria) Stanley Awurum | Varzim | 14 |
| 6 | (Portugal) Alexandre Guedes | Desportivo das Aves | 13 |
| 6 | (Portugal) Paulo Clemente | Santa Clara | 13 |
| 6 | (Panama) Ismael Díaz | Porto B | 13 |
| 6 | (Portugal) Pedrinho | Freamunde | 13 |
| 10 | (Portugal) Luís Barry | Chaves | 12 |
| 10 | (Portugal) Ricardo Barros | Leixões | 12 |
| 10 | (Portugal) Jorge Pires | Portimonense | 12 |

Sources: LPFP (in Portuguese)

== Monthly awards ==
| Month | Player of the Month | Club | Young Player of the Month | Club |
|---|---|---|---|---|
| August | (Portugal) André Silva | Porto B | (Portugal) Domingos Duarte | Sporting CP B |
| September | (Portugal) André Silva | Porto B | (Portugal) Domingos Duarte | Sporting CP B |
| October | (Portugal) Francisco Geraldes | Sporting CP B | (Portugal) Vítor Gonçalves | Gil Vicente |
| November | (Portugal) Francisco Geraldes | Sporting CP B | (Portugal) Pedro Rebocho | Benfica B |
| December | (Portugal) André Silva | Porto B | (Portugal) Vítor São Bento | Farense |
| January | (Portugal) Pedrinho | Freamunde | (Portugal) Sandro Costa | Gil Vicente |
| February | (Brazil) Platiny | Feirense | (Portugal) Gil Dias | Varzim |
| March | (Portugal) Pedrinho | Freamunde | (Portugal) Pedro Sá | Varzim |
| April | (Portugal) Daniel Podence | Sporting CP B | (Portugal) Carraça | Santa Clara |

== Attendances ==
| # | Club | Average |
|---|---|---|
| 1 | Famalicão | 2,808 |
| 2 | Chaves | 2,736 |
| 3 | Vitória B | 1,289 |
| 4 | Varzim | 1,265 |
| 5 | Leixões | 1,225 |
| 6 | Portimonense | 1,206 |
| 7 | Feirense | 1,048 |
| 8 | Gil Vicente | 978 |
| 9 | Freamunde | 930 |
| 10 | Farense | 833 |
| 11 | Aves | 767 |
| 12 | Porto B | 727 |
| 13 | Viseu | 707 |
| 14 | Benfica B | 696 |
| 15 | Penafiel | 575 |
| 16 | Santa Clara | 559 |
| 17 | Olhanense | 529 |
| 18 | Mafra | 485 |
| 19 | Braga B | 457 |
| 20 | Oliveirense | 457 |
| 21 | Oriental | 444 |
| 22 | Covilhã | 318 |
| 23 | Sporting B | 308 |
| 24 | Atlético CP | 268 |
