= SJPF Segunda Liga Young Player of the Month =

The SJPF Segunda Liga Young Player of the Month (often called Second League Young Player of the Month) is an association football award that recognizes the best Segunda Liga young player each month of the season and is conceived by the SJPF (syndicate of professional football players). The award has been presented since the 2010–11 season and the recipient is based on individual scores assigned by the three national sports dailies, A Bola, Record, and O Jogo. Only Portuguese players under the age of 23 are in contention to win the award.

== Winners ==
Key

†	Award was shared with another player
GK	Goalkeeper
DF	Defender
MF	Midfielder
FW	Forward

Month	Year	Nationality	Player	Team	Position	Ref
September	2007	Portugal	Fábio Paím	Trofense	FW	
October	2007	Portugal	Celestino	Estoril	MF	
November	2007	Portugal	João Vilela	Gil Vicente	MF	
December	2007	Portugal	Nuno Coelho	Portimonense	MF	
January	2008	Portugal	Bruno Severino	Gondomar	FW	
February	2008	Portugal	Grosso	Desportivo das Aves	MF	
March	2008	Portugal	Daniel Candeias	Varzim	FW	
April	2008	Portugal	Diogo Ramos	Freamunde	FW	
September	2008	Portugal	Yazalde	Varzim	FW	
October	2008	Portugal	Romeu Ribeiro	Desportivo das Aves	MF	
November	2008	Portugal	André Castro	Olhanense	MF	
December	2008	Portugal	Miguel Rosa	Estoril	MF	
January	2009	Portugal	Bura	Sporting da Covilhã	DF	
February	2009	Portugal	André Pinto	Santa Clara	DF	
March	2009	Portugal	André André	Varzim	MF	
April	2009	Portugal	Ukra	Olhanense	FW	
May	2009	Portugal	Cascavel	Freamunde	FW	
September	2009	Portugal				
October	2009	Portugal				
November	2009	Portugal	João Mendes	Varzim	FW	
December	2009	Portugal	David Simão	Fátima	MF	
January	2010	Portugal	João Silva	Desportivo das Aves	FW	
February	2010	Portugal	João Silva	Desportivo das Aves	FW	
March	2010	Portugal				
April	2010	Portugal				
September	2010	Portugal	Daniel Candeias	Portimonense	FW	
October	2010	Portugal	Tiago Cintra	Leixões	FW	
November	2010	Portugal	André Micael	Moreirense	DF	
December	2010	Portugal	Rabiola	Desportivo das Aves	FW	
January	2011	Portugal	Carlitos	Oliveirense	MF	
February	2011	Portugal	André Carvalhas	Fátima	MF	
March	2011	Portugal	Rui Pedro	Leixões	FW	
April	2011	Portugal	Carlos Fonseca	Feirense	FW	
September	2011	Portugal	Licá	Estoril	FW	
October	2011	Portugal	Miguel Rosa	Belenenses	MF	
November	2011	Portugal	Pedro Santos	Leixões	FW	
December	2011	Portugal	Licá	Estoril	FW	
January	2012	Portugal	Licá	Estoril	FW	
February	2012	Portugal	Licá	Estoril	FW	
March	2012	Portugal	Ricardo Ribeiro	Moreirense	GK	
April	2012	Portugal	Miguel Rosa	Belenenses	MF	
August	2012	Portugal	Miguel Rosa	Benfica B	MF	
September	2012	Portugal	Miguel Rosa	Benfica B	MF	
October	2012	Portugal	Bruma	Sporting CP B	FW	
November	2012	Portugal	Bruma	Sporting CP B	FW	
December	2012	Portugal	Pedro Moreira	Porto B	MF	
January	2013	Portugal	Pedro Moreira	Porto B	MF	
February	2013	Portugal	Miguel Rosa	Benfica B	MF	
March	2013	Portugal	Dani Coelho	Arouca	DF	
April	2013	Portugal	Zé Pedro	Leixões	DF	
August	2013	Portugal	Rafael Lopes	Penafiel	FW	
September	2013	Portugal	Rafael Lopes	Penafiel	FW	
October	2013	Portugal	Mike Moura	Santa Clara	DF	
November	2013	Portugal	Tiago Ferreira	Porto B	FW	
December	2013	Portugal	Vítor Bruno	Penafiel	MF	
January	2014	Portugal	Bruno Loureiro	Académico de Viseu	MF	
February	2014	Portugal	Bruno Loureiro	Académico de Viseu	MF	
March	2014	Portugal	Gonçalo Paciência	Porto B	FW	
April	2014	Portugal	Pité	Beira-Mar	MF	
August	2014	Portugal	João Pinho	Oliveirense	GK	
September	2014	Portugal	João Pinho	Oliveirense	GK	
October	2014	Portugal	Mário Mendonça	Oliveirense	FW	
November	2014	Portugal	João Pinho	Oliveirense	GK	
December	2014	Portugal	Cláudio Ramos	Tondela	GK	
January	2015	Portugal	Pedro Eira	Braga B	DF	
February	2015	Portugal	Cláudio Ramos	Tondela	GK	
March	2015	Portugal	Raphael Guzzo	Chaves	MF	
April	2015	Portugal	Gelson Martins	Sporting CP B	FW	

== Statistics ==
=== Awards won by club ===
Club	Wins
Estoril	6
Oliveirense	5
Desportivo das Aves	5
Leixões	4
Porto B	4
Varzim	4
Benfica B	3
Penafiel	3
Sporting CP B	3
Académico de Viseu	2
Belenenses	2
Fátima	2
Freamunde	2
Moreirense	2
Olhanense	2
Portimonense	2
Santa Clara	2
Tondela	2
Arouca	1
Beira-Mar	1
Braga B	1
Chaves	1
Feirense	1
Freamunde	1
Gil Vicente	1
Gondomar	1
Santa Clara	1
Sporting da Covilhã	1
Trofense	1

=== Multiple winners ===
Rank	Player	Wins
1st	Miguel Rosa	6
2nd	Licá	4
3rd	João Pinho	3
2nd	Bruma	2
2nd	Bruno Loureiro	2
2nd	Cláudio Ramos	2
2nd	Daniel Candeias	2
2nd	João Silva	2
2nd	Pedro Moreira	2
2nd	Rafael Lopes	2

=== Awards won by position ===
Position	Wins
Forward	27
Midfielder	23
Defender	7
Goalkeeper	6

== See also ==
- SJPF Player of the Month
- SJPF Young Player of the Month
- SJPF Segunda Liga Player of the Month
