= Diego Medeiros =

Brazilian footballer (born 1993)

Personal information
- Full name: Diego Luiz de Siqueira Medeiros
- Date of birth: 28 March 1993 (age 33)
- Place of birth: Lorena, Brazil
- Height: 1.85 m (6 ft 1 in)
- Position: Left winger

Team information
- Current team: Sporting da Covilhã
- Number: 10

Youth career
- Vasco da Gama

Senior career*
Years	Team	Apps	(Gls)
2011–2012	Vasco da Gama	0	(0)
2011–2012	→ Audax (loan)	0	(0)
2012–2013	Audax	0	(0)
2013–2014	Ribeirão	16	(3)
2014	Rio Ave	0	(0)
2014	→ Santa Clara (loan)	5	(0)
2014–2017	Famalicão	89	(10)
2017–2019	Paços de Ferreira	24	(0)
2018	→ Nacional (loan)	11	(1)
2019	→ Sporting da Covilhã (loan)	18	(2)
2019–2020	Mafra	16	(4)
2020–2021	Casa Pia	19	(2)
2021–	Sporting da Covilhã	4	(0)
- * Club domestic league appearances and goals as of 21 September 2021

Diego Luiz de Siqueira Medeiros (born 28 March 1993) is a Brazilian professional footballer who plays as a left winger for Portuguese club Sporting da Covilhã.

== Career ==
Medeiros began his career in Brazil with Vasco da Gama, where he was loaned to Audax before subsequently joining Audax permanently. In 2013, he signed for Portuguese club Ribeirão, making 16 appearances and scoring 3 goals in the 2013–14 Campeonato de Portugal. In January 2014, he joined Primeira Liga team Rio Ave but was immediately loaned out to Santa Clara. He played five times for Santa Clara before returning to Rio Ave. On 1 July 2014, Medeiros moved to Campeonato de Portugal club Famalicão. He made his Famalicão debut on 24 August in a league match against Felgueiras 1932.

Mederios went onto make 89 league appearances across three seasons for Famalicão. On 31 January 2017, he joined Primeira Liga side Paços de Ferreira. His first appearance for Paços arrived four days later when he came on as a second-half substitute in a Primeira Liga fixture with Vitória Guimarães. On 9 January 2018, he was loaned out to Nacional of LigaPro. His bow came on 11 days later versus Benfica B, prior to scoring his first goal on 4 February against ex-team Famalicão. He returned to his parent club midway through the year, before leaving on loan in January 2019 to fellow LigaPro team Covilhã.

On 15 July 2019, Medeiros headed off across LigaPro to Mafra. He netted on debut in the Taça da Liga versus Oliveirense, who eliminated Mafra from the competition. In total, the winger made nineteen appearances and scored seven goals; spread across three competitions. September 2020 saw Medeiros join Casa Pia.

== Career statistics ==
As of 17 December 2020

Appearances and goals by club, season and competition
Club	Season	League			National cup		League cup		Continental		Other		Total	
Club	Season	Division	Apps	Goals	Apps	Goals	Apps	Goals	Apps	Goals	Apps	Goals	Apps	Goals
Vasco da Gama	2011	Série A	0	0	0	0	—		0	0	0	0	0	0
Audax (loan)	2011	Paulista Série A2	—		0	0	—		—		0	0	0	0
Audax	2012	Paulista Série A2	—		0	0	—		—		8	0	8	0
Ribeirão	2013–14	Campeonato de Portugal	16	3	1	0	—		—		0	0	17	3
Rio Ave	2013–14	Primeira Liga	0	0	0	0	0	0	—		0	0	0	0
Santa Clara (loan)	2013–14	LigaPro	5	0	0	0	0	0	—		0	0	5	0
Famalicão	2014–15	Campeonato de Portugal	31	3	3	0	—		—		0	0	34	3
Famalicão	2015–16	LigaPro	36	0	0	0	3	0	—		0	0	39	0
Famalicão	2016–17	LigaPro	22	7	0	0	1	0	—		0	0	23	7
Famalicão	Total		89	10	3	0	4	0	0	0	0	0	96	10
Paços de Ferreira	2016–17	Primeira Liga	15	0	—		—		—		0	0	15	0
Paços de Ferreira	2017–18	Primeira Liga	9	0	0	0	1	1	—		0	0	10	1
Paços de Ferreira	2018–19	LigaPro	0	0	0	0	0	0	—		0	0	0	0
Paços de Ferreira	Total		24	0	0	0	1	1	0	0	0	0	25	1
Nacional (loan)	2017–18	LigaPro	11	1	—		—		—		0	0	11	1
Covilhã (loan)	2018–19	LigaPro	18	2	—		—		—		0	0	18	2
Mafra	2019–20	LigaPro	16	4	2	2	1	1	—		0	0	19	7
Casa Pia	2020–21	LigaPro	3	0	1	0	0	0	—		0	0	4	0
Career total			182	20	7	2	6	2	0	0	8	0	203	24
