= Jorge Teixeira (footballer, born 1995) =

Portuguese footballer

Jorge Emanuel Magalhães Teixeira (born 5 June 1995) is a Portuguese footballer who plays for Portimonense S.C. as a forward.

== Career ==
On 12 October 2014, Teixeira made his professional debut with Portimonense in a 2014–15 Segunda Liga match against Santa Clara.
