= Cláudio Braga =

Cláudio Braga may refer to:

- Cláudio Braga (footballer) (born 1999), Portuguese footballer
- Cláudio Braga (manager) (born 1974), Portuguese football manager
