= Anthony da Silva =

Portuguese football manager and former player (born 1980)

Tony
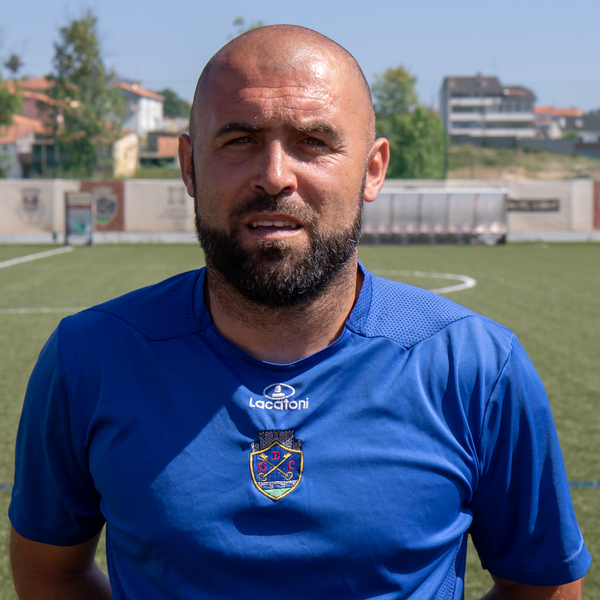
- Tony in 2019

Personal information
- Full name: Anthony da Silva
- Date of birth: 20 December 1980 (age 45)
- Place of birth: Le Creusot, France
- Height: 1.78 m (5 ft 10 in)
- Position: Right-back

Team information
- Current team: Mali (manager)

Youth career
- 1988–1999: Paris Saint-Germain

Senior career*
Years	Team	Apps	(Gls)
1999–2001	Sandinenses	53	(3)
2001–2005	Chaves	100	(1)
2005–2006	Estrela Amadora	45	(0)
2007–2011	CFR Cluj	95	(1)
2011	Vitória Guimarães	2	(0)
2012–2014	Paços Ferreira	47	(1)
2014–2015	Penafiel	11	(0)
Total		353	(6)

Managerial career
- 2015–2016: Académico Viseu (assistant)
- 2016: Académico Viseu (caretaker)
- 2016–2017: Freamunde (assistant)
- 2017: Oliveirense
- 2017–2018: Bragança
- 2018–2019: Vilar Perdizes
- 2019: Chaves U19
- 2019–2022: Cameroon (video analyst)
- 2023: Paços Ferreira (assistant)
- 2023–2024: Montalegre
- 2024: Politehnica Iaşi
- 2025: Politehnica Iaşi
- 2026–: Mali
- * Club domestic league appearances and goals

Anthony da Silva (born 20 December 1980), commonly known as Tony, is a former professional footballer who played as a right-back. He is currently manager of the Mali national team.

== Playing career ==
The son of a Portuguese couple, Tony was born in Le Creusot, Saône-et-Loire. After spending a decade in the youth academy of Paris Saint-Germain FC, he returned to his parents' hometown of Chaves in his teens, making his debut in professional football at the age of 20 with G.D. Chaves in the Segunda Liga and remaining four years with the club at that level.

Silva made his Primeira Liga debut in the 2005–06 season, only missing two games as C.F. Estrela da Amadora easily retained their league status. In January 2007 he moved abroad, signing with CFR Cluj in Romania.

During his spell at Cluj, Silva quickly became a fan favourite for his strong work ethic and dedication, eventually gaining team captaincy. During his stint he won six major titles, including two Liga I championships, contributing a total of 50 appearances and one goal to those conquests (32 matches in 2007–08). In the following campaign he suffered a knee ligament injury which sidelined him for several weeks, but he still recovered in time to help the club win the domestic cup for the second time in its history.

Silva returned to his country in January 2011 and signed with Vitória de Guimarães, aged 30. In the same transfer window but the following year, he joined fellow top-tier side F.C. Paços de Ferreira.

On 5 May 2013, Silva scored his only goal in the Portuguese top flight, netting through a rare header to help his team defeat Sporting CP 1–0 at home and cling on to a best-ever third position, with the subsequent qualification for the UEFA Champions League. He finished his career in 2015, following a spell with F.C. Penafiel in the same league.

== Coaching career ==
After becoming a manager, Silva worked mainly in the lower leagues or amateur football. The exception to this was late into the 2015–16 season, when he went from assistant to interim at Académico de Viseu F.C. after Ricardo Chéu was dismissed by the second division club.

In October 2019, Silva left Chaves' youths and joined his compatriot Toni Conceição's staff at the Cameroon national team, as a video analyst. He then had a brief assistant spell with Paços de Ferreira.

Silva was appointed at C.D.C. Montalegre in the fourth tier on 23 June 2023. He resigned the following March, after a 3–0 away loss to F.C. Tirsense that left them in seventh place.

Silva returned to Romania and its top flight on 31 March 2024, signing for FC Politehnica Iași who were to take part in the play-out round. In June 2026, he became head coach of the Mali national team.

== Honours ==
CFR Cluj

- Liga I: 2007–08, 2009–10
- Cupa României: 2007–08, 2008–09, 2009–10
- Supercupa României: 2009, 2010
