= Bruno Saraiva =

Portuguese football manager and former player

Personal information
- Full name: Bruno José Palminha Saraiva
- Date of birth: 1 October 1974 (age 52)
- Place of birth: Huambo, Angola
- Height: 1.85 m (6 ft 1 in)
- Position: Centre back

Team information
- Current team: Louletano (manager)

Youth career
- 1984–1985: Olhanense
- 1985–1988: Neuchâtel Xamax
- 1988–1994: Olhanense

Senior career*
Years	Team	Apps	(Gls)
1994–1998	Olhanense	82	(2)
1998–1999	Atlético	29	(2)
1999–2000	Amora	24	(2)
2000–2001	Marco	23	(2)
2001–2002	Atlético	32	(0)
2002–2003	Barreirense	38	(0)
2003–2004	Olivais Moscavide	25	(1)
Total		253	(9)

Managerial career
- 2004–2005: Inter Almancil (youth)
- 2005–2006: Olhanense (youth)
- 2006–2011: Inter Almancil (youth)
- 2012–2013: Moncarapachense
- 2013: Olhanense
- 2013: Fátima
- 2014: Louletano
- 2016: Almancilense
- 2017: Olhanense
- 2019: Moncarapachense
- 2022–: Louletano
- * Club domestic league appearances and goals

Bruno José Palminha Saraiva (born 1 October 1974) is a Portuguese former footballer who played as a central defender, currently the manager of Louletano.

== Playing career ==
Born in Huambo, Angola to Portuguese parents, Saraiva competed almost exclusively in the Portuguese third division in a ten-year senior career. He started at S.C. Olhanense, retiring at the age of 29 after a spell with C.D. Olivais e Moscavide.

Saraiva's professional input consisted of the 2000–01 season, starting in 21 of his appearances for F.C. Marco and suffering relegation from the Segunda Liga.

== Coaching career ==
After retiring, Saraiva spent his first years as a manager in youth football. On 1 May 2013, after Olhanense's Manuel Cajuda resigned a few weeks before the end of the 2012–13 campaign, he took on the role of interim at the Primeira Liga club with the primary goal of avoiding relegation. After a 0–0 home draw against C.S. Marítimo this was achieved, and he initially committed to a new deal only to leave the club shortly after and be replaced by former Portugal international Abel Xavier.

On 7 February 2017, after three incomplete spells in the third tier, Saraiva returned to Olhanense who ranked last in division two, eventually not being able to move the team from that place.
