= Filipe Gouveia =

Portuguese footballer

Personal information
- Full name: António Filipe de Sousa Gouveia
- Date of birth: 12 May 1973 (age 53)
- Place of birth: Massarelos, Portugal
- Height: 1.81 m (5 ft 11 in)
- Position: Central midfielder

Team information
- Current team: Al-Jabalain (manager)

Youth career
- 1984–1985: GD Francos
- 1985–1986: Porto
- 1986–1987: Senhora da Hora
- 1987–1988: Boavista
- 1988–1990: Senhora da Hora
- 1990–1991: Varzim

Senior career*
Years	Team	Apps	(Gls)
1991–1992	Varzim	1	(0)
1992–1994	Guarda	32	(2)
1994–1995	Amarante	32	(5)
1995–1997	União Madeira	60	(7)
1997–1998	Paços Ferreira	29	(6)
1998–1999	Farense	30	(3)
1999–2000	Belenenses	18	(1)
2000	→ Montpellier (loan)	9	(1)
2000–2002	Boavista	13	(1)
2001–2002	→ Paços Ferreira (loan)	6	(1)
2002–2005	Nacional	82	(10)
2005–2006	Gil Vicente	30	(1)
2007	Vizela	15	(6)
2007–2009	Aves	50	(2)
2009–2010	Vila Meã	20	(3)
Total		427	(49)

Managerial career
- 2010: Boavista (youth)
- 2011: Boavista
- 2011–2013: Académica (assistant)
- 2013–2014: Salgueiros
- 2014–2015: Santa Clara
- 2015–2016: Académica
- 2016–2017: Covilhã
- 2018: Leixões
- 2019–2021: Al-Jabalain
- 2021–2022: Vilafranquense
- 2022–2023: Al-Hazem
- 2024: Al-Faisaly
- 2025: Brusque
- 2026–: Al-Jabalain
- * Club domestic league appearances and goals

António Filipe de Sousa Gouveia (born 12 May 1973) is a Portuguese football manager and former player who played as a central midfielder. He is currently head coach of Saudi First Division League club Al-Jabalain.

He amassed Primeira Liga totals of 174 matches and 17 goals over eight seasons, representing Farense, Belenenses, Boavista, Paços de Ferreira, Nacional and Gil Vicente. He added 159 appearances and 21 goals in the Segunda Liga, in a 19-year senior career.

Gouveia started working as a manager in 2011.

== Playing career ==
Born in the Porto outskirts of Massarelos, Gouveia played youth football with five clubs, having two separate spells at Sport Clube Senhora da Hora. He made his senior debut with Varzim in the 1991–92 season, and continued competing in the third division the following years.

From 1995 to 1998, Gouveia represented União da Madeira and Paços de Ferreira, with both clubs in the Segunda Liga. Subsequently, he signed with Farense, playing his first match in the Primeira Liga on 12 September 1998 against Porto (90 minutes played, 2–0 away loss).

On the last day of the 2000 January transfer window, Gouveia was loaned by Belenenses to Montpellier in the French Ligue 1, alongside teammate Rui Pataca. At the end of the campaign he returned to Portugal, joining Boavista; he contributed eight substitute appearances in his first year, as the Chequereds won their only national championship.

Gouveia moved to Nacional in summer 2002, proceeding to enjoy his most steady period and leaving after three top-flight seasons and competitive totals of 92 games and 12 goals. He signed with Gil Vicente on a free transfer on 7 June 2005 and, after appearing in just five matches in the first half of 2006–07, with the team again in the second tier, he joined Vizela of the same league.

On 23 June 2007, Gouveia signed a one-year deal with Aves, recently relegated from the top flight. After a spell with amateurs Vila Meã, he retired in 2010 at the age of 37.

== Coaching career ==
Immediately after retiring, Gouveia returned to Boavista to manage the junior side. Two months later, he replaced Rui Ferreira at the main squad.

Gouveia worked with Académica de Coimbra from 2011 to 2013, under Pedro Emanuel. He was part of the squad that reached their first Taça de Portugal final since 1939, defeating Sporting CP on 19 May 2012.

On 20 June 2013, Gouveia was named new head coach of Salgueiros. He was fired just three months later, following a string of poor results.

Gouveia was appointed at Santa Clara on 2 December 2014, following the sacking of Cláudio Braga. His first game in charge took place the following week, and his team defeated Leixões 2–0 at home.

After José Viterbo's resignation, Académica announced the return of Gouveia in September 2015, this time as the new head coach. His first league match at the helm was at Rio Ave on the 28th (1–0 loss), and he only managed to collect six wins until the end of the season, in an eventual return to the second tier after a 14-year stay.

On 3 June 2016, Gouveia was appointed manager of second-division club Covilhã on 3 June 2016. He led the side to the eighth position in his debut campaign, being relieved of his duties on 14 September 2017 due to poor results.

In June 2018, Gouveia was hired at Leixões after Francisco Chaló left for Algeria. He was dismissed that 23 December after a 1–2 home defeat to Cova da Piedade, with the team in 13th place and in the quarter-finals of the domestic cup.

Gouveia signed with Saudi First Division League's Al-Jabalain on 11 July 2019. He returned to Portugal two years later, with second-tier Vilafranquense.

On 5 July 2022, Gouveia returned to Saudi Arabia and its division two by agreeing to a contract at Al-Hazem. He achieved promotion in his first season, but was fired in October 2023 due to poor results.

Gouveia went back to the Saudi second tier in June 2024, becoming manager of Al Faisaly. On 28 November, he left by mutual consent.

On 6 January 2025, Gouveia was appointed at Campeonato Brasileiro Série C club Brusque. On 10 July, after four winless matches, he left by mutual agreement.

Gouveia returned to Al-Jabalain on 13 August 2026, taking over from his compatriot Ricardo Chéu.

== Managerial statistics ==
As of 20 October 2023

Team	From	To	Record				
Team	From	To	G	W	D	L	Win %
Boavista	25 January 2011	30 April 2011	13	9	2	2	69.23
Salgueiros	20 June 2013	7 October 2013	8	1	3	4	12.50
Santa Clara	2 December 2014	24 September 2015	37	11	14	12	29.73
Académica	24 September 2015	15 May 2016	31	6	10	15	19.35
Covilhã	3 June 2016	15 September 2017	59	20	22	17	33.90
Leixões	28 June 2018	23 December 2018	19	9	3	7	47.37
Al-Jabalain	11 July 2019	1 June 2021	78	38	22	18	48.72
Vilafranquense	24 August 2021	1 June 2022	34	12	10	12	35.29
Al-Hazem	5 July 2022	20 October 2023	44	21	11	12	47.73
Al-Faisaly	7 June 2024	28 November 2024	12	3	1	8	25.00
Total			335	130	98	107	38.81

== Honours ==
=== Player ===
Boavista

- Primeira Liga: 2000–01
