= Luís Martins (footballer, born 1963) =

Portuguese football coach

Personal information
- Full name: Luís Manuel Lamas Martins
- Date of birth: 29 November 1963 (age 62)
- Place of birth: Lisbon, Portugal

Team information
- Current team: Sepahan

Managerial career
- Years: Team
- 2003–2004: Sporting CP (Youth team coach)
- 2004–2005: Sporting CP (assistant)
- 2006: Sporting CP (Youth team coach)
- 2006–2007: Portimonense S.C.
- 2008–2010: S.C. Braga (Head of youth development)
- 2010–2012: Saudi Arabia (Coach)
- 2012–2013: Tottenham Hotspur (First-team coach)
- 2014–2016: FC Zenit St. Petersburg (assistant)
- 2017–2018: Sporting CP B
- 2022–: Sepahan (assistant)

Luís Manuel Lamas Martins or simply Luís Martins (born 29 November 1963), is a Portuguese football coach.

== Club career ==
Martins began his career in coaching at Sporting CP as a youth coach. He won national titles for their Under-17 and Under-19 sides, working with players such as Cristiano Ronaldo, Nani and João Moutinho. He was appointed Assistant Manager during the 2004-2005 season during which Sporting reached the final of the UEFA Cup.

During the 2006-2007 season, he managed Portimonense S.C.

In 2008, Luís was appointed head of youth development by S.C. Braga.

In 2010, he coached Saudi Arabia's national and Olympic teams.

During the 2011-2012 season Martins coached Al Ahli's Under-23 side to the national championship in Saudi Arabia.

On 9 July 2012, Luís Martins was appointed first-team coach at Tottenham Hotspur. He left the club following the dismissal of André Villas-Boas on 16 December 2013.

On 20 March 2014, Luis Martins, sign for FC Zenit from Saint Petersburg, elite Champions Club in Russia.

On 17 February 2017 he was appointed the manager of Sporting CP B in LigaPro.

== Links ==
- Luis Martins at tottenhamhotspur.com
