= Horácio Gonçalves =

Portuguese football manager

Personal information
- Full name: Horácio José Paredes Mota Gonçalves
- Date of birth: 25 December 1962 (age 63)
- Place of birth: Guimarães, Portugal
- Position: Forward

Youth career
- 1980–1981: Vitória Guimarães

Senior career*
| Years | Team | Apps | (Gls) |
| 1981–1982 | Valdevez | 22 | (2) |
| 1982–1984 | Fafe | 22 | (7) |
| 1984–1985 | Famalicão | 28 | (8) |
| 1985–1986 | Vitória Guimarães | 10 | (1) |
| 1986–1988 | Fafe | 62 | (22) |
| 1988–1989 | Olhanense | 14 | (9) |
| 1989–1991 | Varzim | 58 | (15) |
| 1991–1992 | Louletano | 28 | (6) |
| 1992–1993 | Oliveirense | 21 | (13) |
| 1993–1994 | Varzim | 19 | (2) |
| Total | | 284 | (85) |

Managerial career
- 1994–1998: Varzim
- 1998: Chaves
- 1999–2000: Maia
- 2001: Olhanense
- 2001–2002: Rio Ave
- 2002–2003: União Madeira
- 2004–2007: Varzim
- 2011: Asteras Tripolis
- 2012: Leixões
- 2012: AEP
- 2013–2014: Santa Clara
- 2014–2015: Leixões
- 2015–2016: Farense
- 2017–2018: Felgueiras 1932
- 2018–2021: Costa do Sol
- 2021: Mozambique
- * Club domestic league appearances and goals

Horácio José Paredes Mota Gonçalves (born 25 December 1962) is a Portuguese retired footballer who played as a forward, currently a manager.

== Playing career ==
Gonçalves was born in Guimarães. He was a youth player at hometown club Vitória S.C. and played his only Primeira Liga season with them in 1985–86, scoring once in ten appearances. He spent the bulk of his career in the Segunda Liga, achieving figures of 234 games and 69 goals for six teams, including two spells at AD Fafe.

== Coaching career ==
Having retired with third-division club Varzim S.C. in 1994 he became their manager, overseeing consecutive promotions to reach the top flight in 1997. He also managed G.D. Chaves in that league immediately after, but spent the rest of his career at lower levels. In December 2004 he returned to second-from-bottom Varzim on an 18-month deal, losing his job in late February 2007 after a run of ten matches without a win.

After four years with Asteras Tripolis F.C. of Super League Greece – mostly in additional roles with just four games as manager – Gonçalves returned to Portugal's second tier with Leixões S.C. in February 2012. He left the tenth-placed side in November to return to the Eastern Mediterranean, with AEP Paphos FC in the Cypriot First Division; his spell there was only for three weeks.

Gonçalves came back to Portugal's division two with C.D. Santa Clara, a second stint at Leixões, and S.C. Farense. In February 2017 he took over at F.C. Felgueiras 1932, his first job at the third tier in over 15 years.

In mid-2018, Gonçalves moved abroad again to CD Costa do Sol in Mozambique, succeeding the Argentine Leonardo Costas. In 2019, they won the Moçambola, Taça de Moçambique, Supertaça de Mozambique and the Maputo Top 8 Tournament.

Gonçalves was appointed manager of Mozambique in April 2021, on a 2 1/2-year contract. His team came fourth at the 2021 COSAFA Cup in South Africa. On 19 October, however, after losses against Cameroon in the 2022 FIFA World Cup qualifiers, his two-year contract was terminated.
