= Pedro Eira =

Portuguese footballer

Personal information
- Full name: Pedro Miguel Eira Pereira
- Date of birth: 24 September 1994 (age 32)
- Place of birth: Pousa, Barcelos, Portugal
- Height: 1.90 m (6 ft 3 in)
- Position: Centre-back

Team information
- Current team: Merelinense

Youth career
- 2002–2006: GFC Pousa
- 2006−2013: Braga

Senior career*
Years	Team	Apps	(Gls)
2013−2015	Braga B	11	(0)
2013–2014	→ Tirsense (loan)	13	(0)
2015	Trofense	16	(1)
2016	Benfica e Castelo Branco	10	(0)
2016–2017	Olhanense	11	(0)
2017–2018	Fafe	5	(0)
2018–2020	Benfica e Castelo Branco	50	(2)
2020–2021	Vila Real	18	(1)
2021–	Merelinense	1	(0)

International career
2012	Portugal U18	2	(0)
- * Club domestic league appearances and goals as of 5 September 2021

Pedro Miguel Eira Pereira (born 24 September 1994) is a Portuguese footballer who plays for Merelinense as a defender.

== Career ==
Eira was born in Pousa. On 27 January 2014, he made his professional debut with Braga B in a 2013–14 Segunda Liga match against Feirense, when he replaced Chidi Osuchukwu in the 81st minute.
