= Sandro Costa =

Portuguese footballer

Personal information
- Full name: Sandro Rafael Ferreira Costa
- Date of birth: 23 September 1995 (age 31)
- Place of birth: Barcelos, Portugal
- Height: 1.84 m (6 ft 1/2 in)
- Position: Centre-back

Team information
- Current team: Limianos

Youth career
- 2005–2009: Braga
- 2009–2014: Gil Vicente

Senior career*
Years	Team	Apps	(Gls)
2014–2015	Vilaverdense	30	(0)
2015–2018	Gil Vicente	88	(0)
2018–2019	Rieti	0	(0)
2019–2020	Pinhalnovense	25	(0)
2020–2022	Oriental Dragon	53	(1)
2022–2023	Vianense	39	(0)
2024–	Limianos	15	(0)
- * Club domestic league appearances and goals as of 00:12, 2 May 2024 (UTC)

Sandro Rafael Ferreira Costa (born 23 September 1995) is a Portuguese professional footballer who plays as a central defender for A.D. Os Limianos.

== Club career ==
=== Gil Vicente ===
Born in Barcelos, Braga District, Costa played youth football with S.C. Braga and Gil Vicente FC, joining the latter's academy at the age of 14. He made his senior debut with Vilaverdense F.C. in the lower leagues.

Costa's first match in the Segunda Liga with Gil occurred on 8 August 2015, when he featured the entire 1–1 home draw against C.D. Mafra. In January 2016, he was voted the competition's best young player.

=== Rieti ===
On 30 July 2018, Costa signed a two-year contract with Italian Serie C club F.C. Rieti. He did not appear in any competitive games due to a serious cruciate ligament injury, and left by mutual consent on 15 May 2019.
