= Leonardo Costas =

Argentine association football manager

Personal information
- Full name: Leonardo Fabio Costas
- Date of birth: 26 May 1966 (age 60)
- Place of birth: Argentina
- Position: Midfielder

Managerial career
- Years: Team
- 2017: GDR Textáfrica
- 2017-2018: CD Costa do Sol

Leonardo Costas (born 26 May 1966 in Argentina) is an Argentinean retired footballer who last worked as head coach of CD Costa do Sol in Mozambique.

== Career ==
Costas started his senior career with Racing Club de Avellaneda in the Argentine Primera División, where he made sixty-three appearances and scored two goals. After that, he played for Locarno, Club Atlético Banfield, Defensa y Justicia, Club Almagro, and CSyD Tristán Suárez.
