= Nascimento (footballer, born 1960) =

Portuguese football manager and former player

Personal information
- Full name: Rui António da Cruz Ferreira
- Date of birth: 22 March 1960 (age 66)
- Place of birth: Leiria, Portugal
- Height: 1.82 m (6 ft 0 in)
- Position: Midfielder

Youth career
- 1972–1977: Saint-Dié

Senior career*
Years	Team	Apps	(Gls)
1977–1979	Saint-Dié	24	(2)
1979–1982	União Leiria	66	(2)
1982–1985	Vitória Setúbal	85	(17)
1985–1989	Vitória Guimarães	107	(4)
1989–1990	Porto	13	(1)
1990–1992	Tirsense	45	(5)
1992–1993	Amora	5	(0)
Total		345	(31)

International career
1987	Portugal	5	(0)

Managerial career
- 1994–1997: Braga (assistant)
- 1997–1998: Belenenses (assistant)
- 1998–2002: Braga (assistant)
- 2002–2003: União Leiria (assistant)
- 2003–2004: Beira-Mar (assistant)
- 2004: Marítimo (assistant)
- 2005–2006: Naval (assistant)
- 2006–2007: Pinhalnovense
- 2007–2008: Vitória Guimarães (assistant)
- 2009–2011: Al Sharjah (assistant)
- 2011–2012: União Leiria (assistant)
- 2012: Covilhã
- 2012–2013: Olhanense (assistant)
- 2013–2014: União Leiria
- 2014–2015: Atlético
- 2015: Marítimo B
- 2017–2018: Army United
- * Club domestic league appearances and goals

Rui António da Cruz Ferreira (born 22 March 1960), known as Nascimento, is a Portuguese retired footballer who played as a central midfielder, and a current manager.

== Club career ==
Born in Leiria, Nascimento made his professional debuts with local União Desportiva in 1979, after playing his youth football and starting his senior career in France. He consolidated himself as a Primeira Liga player in the following seven seasons, playing with Vitória de Setúbal (three years) and Vitória de Guimarães (four), always as first-choice and scoring nearly 30 overall goals.

At the age of 29, Nascimento signed with FC Porto, winning the only title of his career, the national championship, but he only collected 13 appearances in a total of 542 minutes. He closed out his career at 33, after spells with lowly F.C. Tirsense (two years, one of those in the top flight) and Amora FC.

Nascimento started his managerial career in the early 2000s, and would work mainly as an assistant, always under Manuel Cajuda. His first head coach experience arrived in 2006, with C.D. Pinhalnovense in the third level.

== International career ==
Nascimento represented Portugal at the 1979 FIFA World Youth Championship, helping his team to the quarter-finals. He went on to earn five caps for the senior side in 1987, after the vast majority of the players defected following the Saltillo Affair at the 1986 FIFA World Cup.
