= Pousa =

- Civil parish
- Location in Portugal
- Coordinates: 41.552°N 8.518°W
- Country: Portugal
- Region: Norte
- Intermunic. comm.: Cávado
- District: Braga
- Municipality: Barcelos

Area
  - Total: 6.63 km^{2} (2.56 sq mi)

Population (2011)
  - Total: 2,272
  - Density: 340/km^{2} (890/sq mi)
- Time zone: UTC+00:00 (WET)
  - Summer (DST): UTC+01:00 (WEST)

Pousa is a Portuguese freguesia ("civil parish"), located in the municipality of Barcelos. The population in 2011 was 2,272, in an area of 6.63 km^{2}.

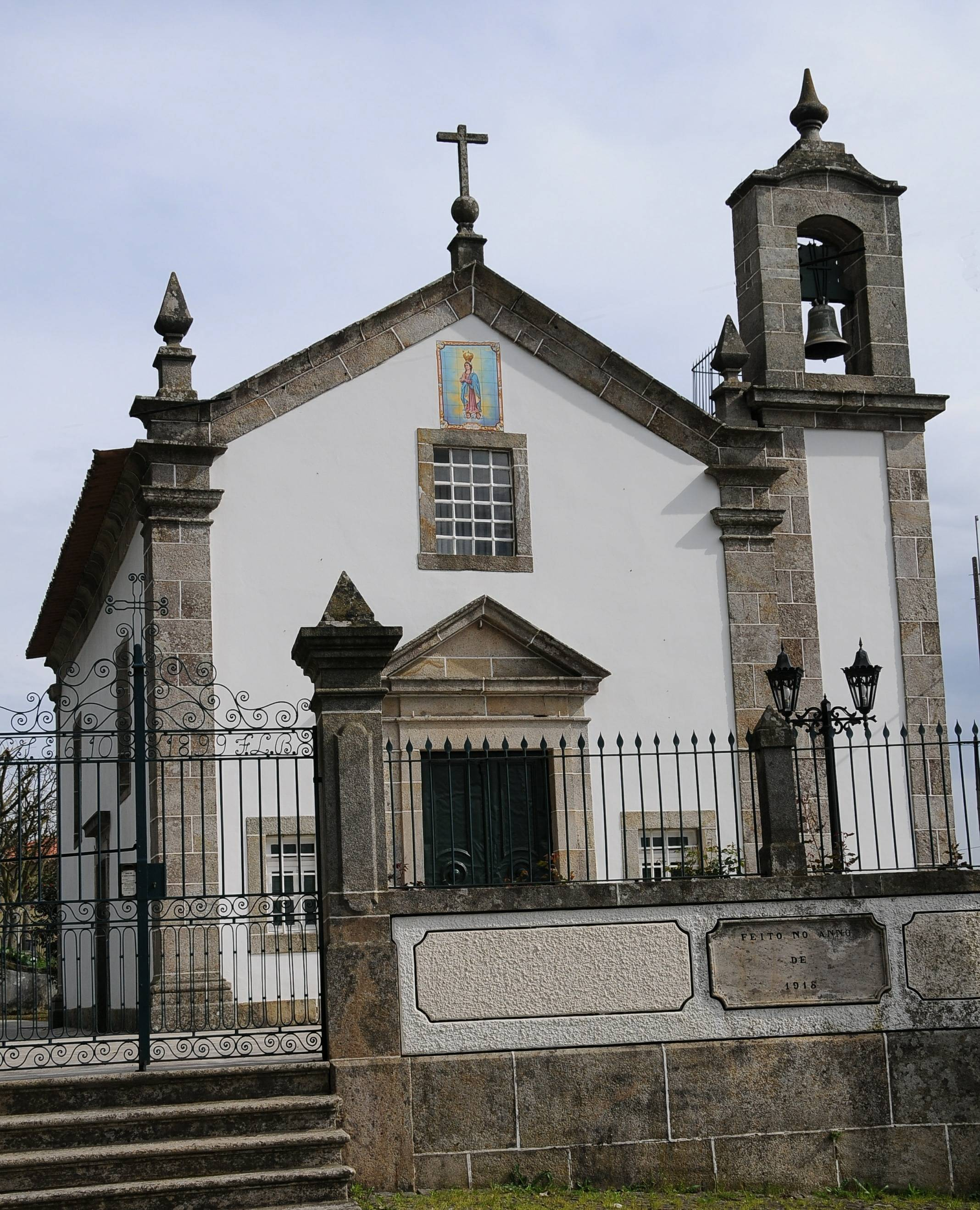
Our Lady of Hope Chapel

Pousa is located in between the two sub-cities (Barcelos and Braga) in the northern region of Portugal. Many of its residents work in the sub-cities as they are within 30 minutes reach using motorised transport. It is surrounded by a beautiful mainstream river along with mountains filled with pine/oak trees. Forest fires are rare but not overlooked by authorities as there is at least one every year. Pousa has the Auto Estrada Porto-Valença running across through its border of its neighbour (Graca).
