= Bruno Loureiro =

Portuguese footballer

Personal information
- Full name: Bruno Filipe Santos Loureiro
- Date of birth: 23 September 1989 (age 37)
- Place of birth: Viseu, Portugal
- Height: 1.73 m (5 ft 8 in)
- Position: Midfielder

Team information
- Current team: Mangualde

Youth career
- 2000–2008: Repesenses

Senior career*
Years	Team	Apps	(Gls)
2008–2012	Penalva	109	(14)
2012–2014	Académico Viseu	62	(5)
2014–2015	Pogoń Szczecin	0	(0)
2015–2016	Farense	15	(1)
2016–2021	Académico Viseu	89	(5)
2021–2022	Lusitano Vildemoinhos	28	(3)
2022–	Mangualde	30	(8)
- * Club domestic league appearances and goals as of 08:25, 26 July 2023 (UTC)

Bruno Filipe Santos Loureiro (born 23 September 1989) is a Portuguese professional footballer who plays for G.D. Mangualde as a midfielder.

== Club career ==
Born in Viseu, Loureiro started his senior career with local amateurs S.C. Penalva do Castelo. In 2012, the 23-year-old signed with neighbouring Académico de Viseu FC, helping them promote to the Segunda Liga in his first season.

Loureiro made his second division debut on 10 August 2013, playing the full 90 minutes in a 2–0 away loss against Moreirense FC. He scored his first goal as a professional on 27 November of the same year, helping the hosts defeat F.C. Penafiel 1–0. During his first spell at the Estádio do Fontelo he was voted the competition's young player of the month twice, in January and February 2014.

On 25 July 2014, Loureiro moved to Pogoń Szczecin of the Polish Ekstraklasa on a one-year contract with the option for a further season. He returned to his country shortly after with no competitive appearances to his credit, going on to represent S.C. Farense and then Académico Viseu.
