= João Pinho =

Portuguese footballer

Personal information
- Full name: João Paulo Silva Pinho
- Date of birth: 30 April 1992 (age 34)
- Place of birth: Oliveira de Azeméis, Portugal
- Height: 1.89 m (6 ft 2 1/2 in)
- Position: Goalkeeper

Youth career
- 2003–2011: Oliveirense

Senior career*
Years	Team	Apps	(Gls)
2011–2016	Oliveirense	157	(1)
2016–2018	Paços Ferreira	0	(0)
2018–2019	Freamunde	27	(0)
2019–2020	Bragança	22	(0)
2020–2021	Amarante	25	(0)
2021–2022	Leça	16	(0)
2022–2023	Alpendorada	11	(0)
Total		258	(1)

International career
2012–2013	Portugal U21	4	(0)
- * Club domestic league appearances and goals

João Paulo Silva Pinho (born 30 April 1992 in Oliveira de Azeméis, Porto metropolitan area) is a Portuguese former professional footballer who played as a goalkeeper.
