= Cláudio Braga (manager) =

Portuguese football manager (born 1974)

Personal information
- Full name: Cláudio José Ferreira Braga
- Date of birth: 23 November 1974 (age 51)
- Place of birth: Lisbon, Portugal

Team information
- Current team: Al Wasl (sporting director)

Managerial career
- Years: Team
- 2014: Santa Clara
- 2015: 's-Gravenzande
- 2016–2017: Nieuwerkerk
- 2018: Fortuna Sittard
- 2018: Marítimo
- 2019–2020: Dordrecht
- 2025: Excelsior Maassluis

Cláudio José Ferreira Braga (born 23 November 1974) is a Portuguese professional football manager and executive who is the sporting director of UAE Pro League club Al Wasl.

== Managerial career ==
Braga began his career as youth trainer with the academies of Excelsior, Sparta Rotterdam, Feyenoord, PSV, and Jong FC Utrecht. He had his first stint as manager with Santa Clara in 2014, in the Liga Portugal 2. He returned to the Netherlands to coach various amateur teams, before being appointed as interim manager with Fortuna Sittard. He managed to get them promoted into the Eredivisie in his short stint there. He was then named the manager of Marítimo in the Primeira Liga on 12 June 2018.

On 21 December 2018, Braga was appointed head coach of Dutch Eerste Divisie club Dordrecht on a one-and-a-half-year contract. After failing to lead the club from the lower regions of the league table, he was dismissed on 8 February 2020.

Ahead of the 2020–21 season, Braga became technical director of UAE Pro League side Al Wahda. After one season, he was appointed youth academy director of Israeli Premier League club Maccabi Tel Aviv. On 28 November 2023, Braga reached an agreement with the club to step down from his role. Several youth coaches at Maccabi Tel Aviv had been drafted to the Israel Defense Forces following the 2023 Hamas-led attack on Israel, complicating his position at the club.

On 24 December 2024, Braga was appointed head coach of Tweede Divisie club Excelsior Maassluis, initially aimed at starting for the 2025–26 season. He would step into the role prematurely in April 2025, due to Cesco Agterberg stepping down from his role. After two successful months, he left the club in June 2025, as he had accepted the position of sporting director of UAE Pro League club Al Wasl.
