= Ricardo Chéu =

Portuguese football manager

Personal information
- Full name: Ricardo José Moutinho Chéu
- Date of birth: 14 May 1981 (age 45)
- Place of birth: Vila Nova de Foz Côa, Portugal

Team information
- Current team: Difaâ Hassani El Jadidi (manager)

Managerial career
- Years: Team
- 2003–2005: Salgueiros (youth)
- 2007–2008: Padroense (youth)
- 2008–2010: Olhanense (fitness coach)
- 2010–2011: Académica Coimbra (assistant)
- 2011–2012: Santa Clara (fitness coach)
- 2012: Santa Clara (caretaker)
- 2012–2013: Feirense (assistant)
- 2013: Mirandela
- 2014: Académico Viseu
- 2014: Penafiel
- 2014–2016: Académico Viseu
- 2016–2017: Freamunde
- 2017–2018: União Madeira
- 2018: Rieti
- 2019: Senica
- 2019–2020: Spartak Trnava
- 2021–2022: Estrela Amadora
- 2022: Doxa Katokopias
- 2023: Vilafranquense
- 2023–2024: Oliveirense
- 2024–2025: Petro de Luanda
- 2025–2026: Al-Jabalain
- 2026–: Difaâ Hassani El Jadidi

Ricardo José Moutinho Chéu (born 14 May 1981) is a Portuguese football manager. He currently manages Difaâ Hassani El Jadidi.

He managed Penafiel for four Primeira Liga games in 2014, while also leading six teams in the second tier. Abroad, he worked in Italy, Slovakia and Cyprus.

== Managerial career ==
After leading Académico de Viseu to a mid-table finish in the 2013–14 season, Chéu was appointed in May 2014 as the new coach of Penafiel. Following three defeats in the first four games of the 2014–15 season, he left by mutual consent.

In November 2014, two months after departing from Penafiel, Chéu returned to management by returning to former side Académico de Viseu. In his second stint with the Viriatos, Chéu led them to a twelfth-place finish. The following season saw him depart in February 2016 after a string of poor results.

On 25 October 2016, Chéu succeeded Carlos Brito at Freamunde. After seven wins and six draws from 22 games in the second division, he resigned on 1 April following a 4–2 loss at Braga B.

Chéu returned to work on 14 December 2017 as the third manager of the season at 18th-placed União da Madeira. His team were relegated on the final day after a 3–2 loss at Cova da Piedade, whose winner came in the fourth minute of added time.

In July 2018 Chéu moved to Italy, accepting the role of head coach of newly promoted Serie C club Rieti. He resigned on 30 December following the club's change of ownership.

On 9 January 2019 Chéu was named new head coach of Slovak Super Liga club Senica on an 18-month deal, with the club second from bottom. Having avoided relegation, he moved in June to Spartak Trnava in the same league. He was replaced a year later, after coming fifth.

Chéu returned to his country's second tier on 11 September 2021, succeeding Rui Santos at 13th-placed Estrela da Amadora. He left by mutual consent at the end of the season on 1 June, having fallen one place in the table over his spell.

Chéu was hired at Doxa Katokopias of the Cypriot First Division in August 2022 and began his tenure on 29 August with a goalless draw away to the previous season's runners-up, AEK Larnaca. He left before the end of the calendar year and returned to Portugal's second tier on 9 February 2023 at Vilafranquense. On 28 May 2023, after the last match of the 2022–23 season, Chéu announced that he would leave Vilafranquense, as the club would relocate to Aves to be rebranded as AVS Futebol SAD .

On 11 December 2023, Chéu was appointed head coach of Liga Portugal 2 side Oliveirense.

On 11 August 2025, Chéu was appointed as manager of Saudi First Division League club Al-Jabalain.

== Managerial statistics ==
As of match played 19 February 2025

Managerial record by team and tenure
| Team | Nat | From | To | Record | | | | | | | |
| Team | Nat | From | To | G | W | D | L | GF | GA | GD | Win % |
|---|---|---|---|---|---|---|---|---|---|---|---|
| Santa Clara (caretaker) | (Portugal) | 26 March 2012 | 2 April 2012 | 1 | 1 | 0 | 0 | 1 | 0 | +1 | 100.00 |
| Mirandela | (Portugal) | 1 July 2013 | 31 December 2013 | 16 | 6 | 6 | 4 | 17 | 12 | +5 | 37.50 |
| Académico de Viseu | (Portugal) | 2 January 2014 | 10 May 2014 | 19 | 10 | 1 | 8 | 23 | 20 | +3 | 52.63 |
| Penafiel | (Portugal) | 16 May 2014 | 16 September 2014 | 4 | 0 | 0 | 4 | 1 | 9 | −8 | 0.00 |
| Académico de Viseu | (Portugal) | 13 November 2014 | 8 February 2016 | 63 | 24 | 17 | 22 | 72 | 72 | +0 | 38.10 |
| Freamunde | (Portugal) | 25 October 2016 | 5 April 2017 | 22 | 7 | 6 | 9 | 21 | 26 | −5 | 31.82 |
| União da Madeira | (Portugal) | 14 December 2017 | 4 July 2018 | 23 | 8 | 4 | 11 | 26 | 38 | −12 | 34.78 |
| Rieti | (Italy) | 4 July 2018 | 30 December 2018 | 21 | 7 | 1 | 13 | 23 | 32 | −9 | 33.33 |
| Senica | (Slovakia) | 9 January 2019 | 12 June 2019 | 17 | 8 | 2 | 7 | 28 | 19 | +9 | 47.06 |
| Spartak Trnava | (Slovakia) | 12 June 2019 | 4 June 2020 | 31 | 14 | 4 | 13 | 45 | 36 | +9 | 45.16 |
| Estrela da Amadora | (Portugal) | 12 September 2021 | 30 June 2022 | 33 | 10 | 9 | 14 | 42 | 50 | −8 | 30.30 |
| Doxa Katokopias | (Cyprus) | 11 August 2022 | 28 December 2022 | 17 | 4 | 2 | 11 | 13 | 25 | −12 | 23.53 |
| Vilafranquense | (Portugal) | 9 February 2023 | 28 May 2023 | 15 | 4 | 4 | 7 | 15 | 15 | +0 | 26.67 |
| Oliveirense | (Portugal) | 11 December 2023 | 19 May 2024 | 21 | 4 | 6 | 11 | 21 | 31 | −10 | 19.05 |
| Petro de Luanda | (Angola) | 1 June 2024 | 2 May 2025 | 19 | 12 | 6 | 1 | 30 | 9 | +21 | 63.16 |
| Total | | | | 322 | 119 | 68 | 135 | 378 | 394 | −16 | 36.96 |
