= 2021–22 Liga Portugal 2 =

32nd season of second-tier football league in Portugal

Liga Portugal 2
- Season: 2021–22
- Dates: August 2021 – May 2022
- Champions: Rio Ave
- Promoted: Rio Ave; Casa Pia; Chaves
- Relegated: Académica; Varzim
- Matches: 306

The 2021–22 Liga Portugal 2, also known as Liga Portugal SABSEG for sponsorship reasons, was the 32nd season of Portuguese football's second-tier league, and the second season under the current Liga Portugal 2 title. A total of 18 teams were competing in this division, including reserve sides from top-flight Primeira Liga teams.

== Teams ==
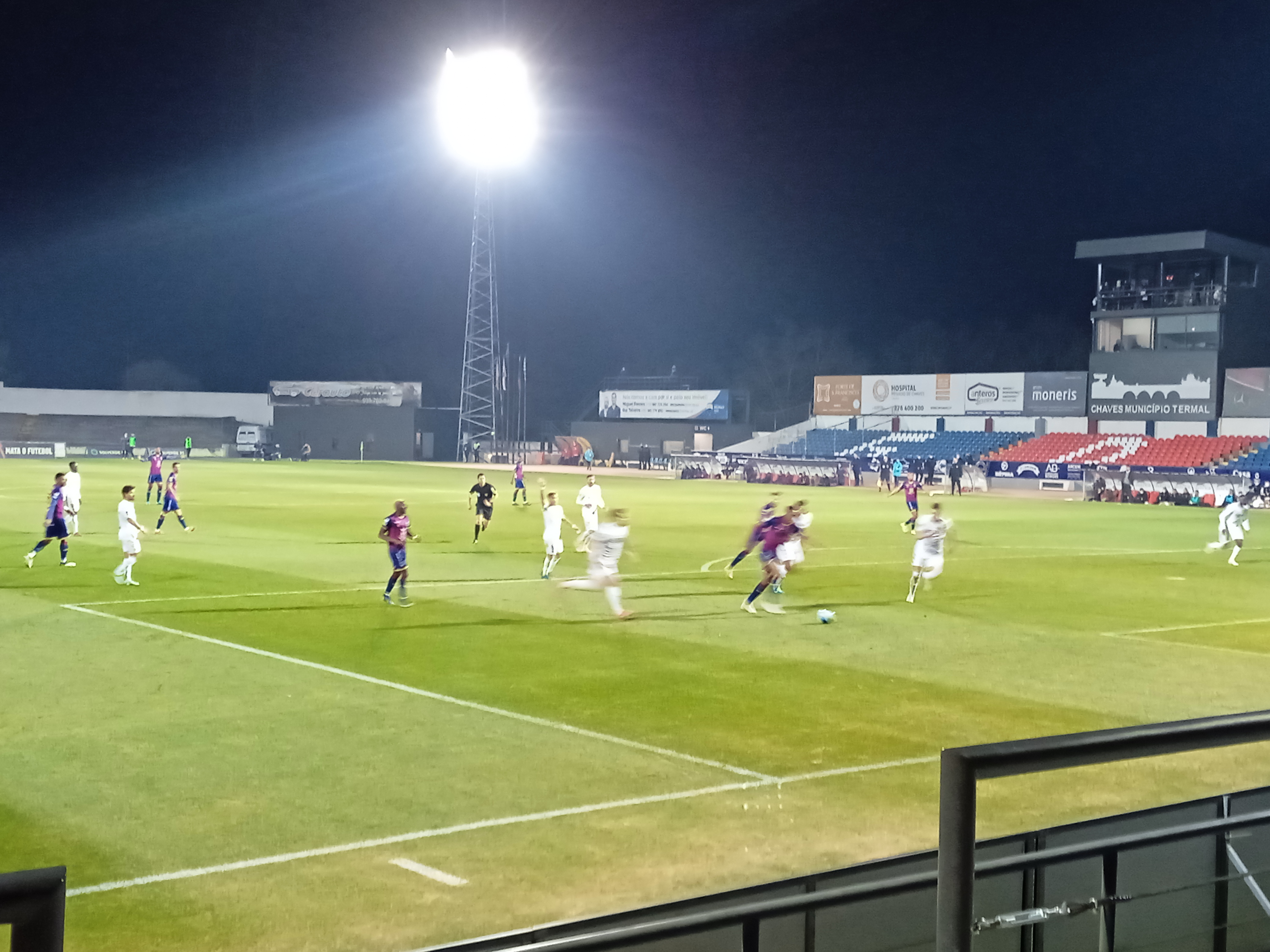
GD Chaves - Rio Ave.

A total of 18 teams contest the league, including 13 sides from the 2020–21 season, 3 teams relegated from the 2020–21 Primeira Liga and 2 promoted from the 2020–21 Campeonato de Portugal.

Farense and Nacional were relegated to 2021–22 Liga Portugal 2 after finishing in 17th and 18th placed teams in 2020–21 Primeira Liga.

Rio Ave were relegated after finishing in 16th place in 2020–21 Primeira Liga and losing the Relegation play-offs against Arouca.

Trofense (promoted after a six-year absence) and Estrela da Amadora (promoted for the first time) were promoted from the 2020–21 Campeonato de Portugal, replacing Oliveirense and Cova da Piedade.

Cova da Piedade failed to produce valid licensing documentation to compete in the 2021–22 season of the Liga Portugal 2, so they have been relegated by the Portuguese Football Professional League to the Liga 3. As a result, Vilafranquense, that finished in 17th place in the 2020–21 Liga Portugal 2 were invited to play in the second tier for the 2021–22 season.

=== Team changes ===
Relegated from 2020–21 Primeira Liga

- Farense
- Nacional
- Rio Ave

Promoted from 2020–21 Campeonato de Portugal

- Estrela da Amadora
- Trofense

Promoted to 2021–22 Primeira Liga

- Estoril
- Vizela
- Arouca

Relegated to 2021–22 Liga 3

- Oliveirense
- Cova da Piedade

=== Stadium and locations ===
Location of teams in 2021–22 Liga Portugal 2
Location of teams in 2021–22 Primeira Liga (Madeira)

Team	Location	Stadium	Capacity	2020–21 finish
Académica	Coimbra	Estádio Cidade de Coimbra	29,622	4th
Académico de Viseu	Viseu	Estádio do Fontelo	6,912	14th
Benfica B	Seixal	Benfica Campus	2,644	8th
Casa Pia	Lisbon	Estádio Pina Manique	1,600	9th
Chaves	Chaves	Estádio Municipal Eng.º; Manuel Branco Teixeira	8,396	6th
Estrela da Amadora	Amadora	Estádio José Gomes	9,288	2nd (CP)
Farense	Faro	Estádio de São Luís	7,000	17th (PL)
Feirense	Santa Maria da Feira	Estádio Marcolino de Castro	5,401	5th
Leixões	Matosinhos	Estádio do Mar	9,821	10th
Mafra	Mafra	Estádio Municipal de Mafra	1,257	12th
Nacional	Funchal	Estádio da Madeira	5,200	18th (PL)
Penafiel	Penafiel	Estádio Municipal 25 de Abril	5,230	7th
Porto B	Vila Nova de Gaia	Estádio Municipal Jorge Sampaio	8,272	16th
Rio Ave	Vila do Conde	Estádio dos Arcos	5,300	16th (PL)
Sp. Covilhã	Covilhã	Estádio Municipal; José dos Santos Pinto	3,500	13th
Trofense	Trofa	Estádio do CD Trofense	5,074	1st (CP)
Varzim	Póvoa de Varzim	Estádio do Varzim SC	7,280	15th
Vilafranquense	Vila Franca de Xira	Estádio Municipal de Rio Maior	7,000	17th

=== Personnel and sponsors ===
Team	Manager	Captain	Kit Manufacturer	Main Sponsor
Académica	(Portugal) Rui Borges	(Portugal) João Traquina	(Portugal) Playoff	(Portugal) Efapel
Académico de Viseu	(Portugal) Zé Gomes	(Portugal) João Pica	(Italy) Macron	(Portugal) Palácio do Gelo
Benfica B	(Portugal) Nélson Veríssimo	(Portugal) Pedro Ganchas	(Germany) Adidas	(United Arab Emirates) Emirates
Casa Pia	(Portugal) Filipe Martins	(Portugal) Vasco Fernandes	(Italy) Macron	(Portugal) ESC Online
Chaves	(Portugal) Vítor Campelos	(Portugal) Luís Rocha	(Portugal) Lacatoni	(Portugal) Forte de São; Francisco Hotel
Estrela da Amadora	(Portugal) Ricardo Chéu	(Portugal) Sérgio Conceição	(Portugal) Claw	(Portugal) Remax
Farense	(Portugal) Jorge Costa	(Brazil) Fabrício Isidoro	(Portugal) Lacatoni	(Portugal) Couteiro-Mor
Feirense	(Portugal) Rui Ferreira	(Portugal) Fábio Espinho	(Italy) Legea	
Leixões	(Portugal) José Mota	(Burundi) Nduwarugira	(Portugal) Zeus	(Portugal) Matosinhos
Mafra	(Portugal) Ricardo Sousa	(Portugal) Guilherme Ferreira	(Portugal) Lacatoni	(Portugal) Moticristo
Nacional	(Portugal) Costinha	(Portugal) Vítor Gonçalves	(Denmark) Hummel	
Penafiel	(Portugal) Pedro Ribeiro	(Portugal) Aníbal Capela	(Italy) Macron	
Porto B	(Portugal) António Folha	(Portugal) Ricardo Silva	(United States) New Balance	(Portugal) AMCO
Rio Ave	(Portugal) Luís Freire	(Portugal) Vítor Gomes	(Germany) Puma	(Portugal) MEO
Sp. Covilhã	(Brazil) Wender	(Portugal) Gilberto Silva	(Portugal) Lacatoni	(Portugal) Sport Hotel
Trofense	(Portugal) Rui Duarte	(Portugal) Vasco Rocha	(Portugal) Lacatoni	(Portugal) Mercainox
Varzim	(Portugal) António Barbosa	(Portugal) André Micael	(Portugal) Stadio	(Portugal) Vendeiro
Vilafranquense	(Portugal) Carlos Pinto	(Angola) Evandro Brandão	(Germany) Adidas	

== Season summary ==
=== League table ===
Pos	Team	Pld	W	D	L	GF	GA	GD	Pts	Promotion or relegation
1	Rio Ave (C, P)	34	21	7	6	52	31	+21	70	Promotion to Primeira Liga
2	Casa Pia (P)	34	21	5	8	50	22	+28	68	Promotion to Primeira Liga
3	Chaves (O, P)	34	18	10	6	54	35	+19	64	Qualification to Promotion play-offs
4	Feirense	34	17	7	10	50	37	+13	58	
5	Benfica B (I)	34	17	6	11	61	44	+17	57	
6	Nacional	34	14	9	11	52	44	+8	51 (Note: Nacional are ranked ahead of Penafiel on head-to-head away goals: Nacional 3–1 Penafiel, Penafiel 1–0 Nacional.)	
7	Penafiel	34	14	9	11	38	38	0	51	
8	Leixões	34	13	9	12	42	40	+2	48	
9	Mafra	34	11	10	13	37	42	−5	43	
10	Porto B (I)	34	10	12	12	45	49	−4	42	
11	Farense	34	10	11	13	40	42	−2	41 (Note: Farense are ranked ahead of Vilafranquense on head-to-head away goals: Farense 1–0 Vilafranquense, Vilafranquense 2–2 Farense.)	
12	Vilafranquense	34	10	11	13	41	47	−6	41	
13	Trofense	34	10	10	14	35	41	−6	40	
14	Estrela da Amadora	34	9	10	15	42	55	−13	37 (Note: Estrela da Amadora are ranked ahead of Académico de Viseu on head-to-head away goals: Académico de Viseu 0–4 Estrela da Amadora, Estrela da Amadora 1–3 Académico de Viseu.)	
15	Académico de Viseu	34	10	7	17	30	48	−18	37	
16	Sporting da Covilhã (O)	34	8	12	14	30	43	−13	36	Qualification to Relegation play-offs
17	Varzim (R)	34	8	11	15	25	39	−14	35	Relegation to Liga 3
18	Académica (R)	34	3	8	23	35	62	−27	17	Relegation to Liga 3

Source: Liga Portugal
Rules for classification: 1) Points; 2) Head-to-head points; 3) Head-to-head goal difference; 4) Head-to-head away goals scored; 5) Goal difference; 6) Matches won; 7) Goals scored; 8) Play-off.
(C) Champions; (I) Ineligible for promotion; (O) Play-off winners; (P) Promoted; (R) Relegated

== Relegation play-offs ==
The relegation play-offs took place on 21 and 29 May 2022.

All times are WEST (UTC+1).

Team 1	Agg.	Team 2	1st leg	2nd leg
Sp. Covilhã	2–0	Alverca	0–0	2–0

21 May 2022

Alverca	0–0	Sp. Covilhã
	Report

Complexo Desportivo do FC Alverca, Alverca
29 May 2022

Sp. Covilhã	2–0	Alverca
Felipe Dini 1'; Rui Gomes 29'	Report

Estádio Municipal José dos Santos Pinto, Covilhã

Sporting Covilhã won 2–0 on aggregate and will play in the 2022–23 Liga Portugal 2; Alverca will play in the 2022–23 Liga 3.

== Results ==
Home \ Away	ACA	ACV	BEN	CAS	CHA	EST	FAR	FEI	LEI	MAF	NAC	PEN	POR	RAV	SCO	TRO	VAR	VIL
Académica	—	1–2	3–4	0–2	1–2	2–2	0–0	1–2	1–0	0–2	1–2	0–0	1–2	1–2	3–0	1–1	1–1	1–2
Académico de Viseu	1–0	—	0–1	2–1	0–2	0–4	2–2	0–2	1–2	1–3	1–4	1–2	1–1	0–1	1–1	2–1	1–0	0–0
Benfica B	3–1	1–2	—	1–1	3–1	0–0	3–0	1–2	2–3	1–3	5–0	1–0	1–2	2–0	0–0	2–1	1–2	0–0
Casa Pia	2–0	0–1	4–2	—	1–0	3–0	1–0	1–1	1–0	3–1	1–0	2–0	2–0	0–1	4–0	1–0	1–0	2–1
Chaves	3–2	3–0	1–1	4–1	—	2–2	2–1	3–1	1–1	0–1	2–0	3–1	4–2	2–1	1–0	0–0	1–0	1–0
Estrela da Amadora	1–3	4–0	3–6	1–0	1–3	—	3–1	1–2	1–0	0–2	0–0	0–2	0–0	2–5	0–1	2–0	0–0	0–1
Farense	3–1	1–1	2–2	0–1	1–2	3–0	—	0–1	0–1	1–0	2–2	2–2	2–0	1–1	1–0	2–0	0–1	1–0
Feirense	1–0	2–1	2–1	1–1	3–1	1–2	4–1	—	0–1	1–0	4–1	1–2	3–2	0–0	1–2	1–2	2–1	1–1
Leixões	2–1	1–4	1–2	1–5	1–1	3–0	3–1	2–0	—	2–0	0–1	0–1	0–0	2–2	2–1	1–2	1–1	1–1
Mafra	2–2	0–0	2–1	1–1	0–1	2–2	0–2	0–1	0–2	—	3–2	1–1	3–2	1–1	1–1	0–0	0–0	1–0
Nacional	3–1	1–2	0–3	1–2	1–1	4–1	3–2	2–1	2–0	1–1	—	3–0	1–0	2–0	1–1	1–1	2–1	4–0
Penafiel	0–0	0–0	0–1	1–0	2–1	0–2	1–3	2–0	1–1	2–1	1–0	—	1–2	1–1	1–1	1–0	4–1	4–3
Porto B	3–3	1–0	2–3	0–3	0–0	2–2	0–0	2–1	1–0	3–1	1–1	3–1	—	1–1	3–1	2–2	2–2	0–1
Rio Ave	5–1	1–2	2–1	1–0	3–0	1–0	2–1	0–4	2–1	1–2	1–0	2–0	1–0	—	3–1	1–0	1–1	2–1
Sp. Covilhã	2–0	2–1	1–2	0–1	0–2	1–3	0–0	2–2	1–1	2–0	1–1	0–0	1–2	0–1	—	2–0	1–0	1–1
Trofense	2–1	1–0	2–0	0–0	1–1	0–0	1–1	0–1	1–2	1–3	0–3	2–1	2–2	0–1	3–0	—	1–0	1–3
Varzim	1–0	1–0	0–2	1–0	2–2	3–1	0–1	0–0	1–1	2–0	0–0	0–2	2–1	0–3	0–2	1–3	—	0–2
Vilafranquense	2–1	2–1	1–2	0–2	1–1	2–2	2–2	1–1	1–3	2–0	4–3	0–1	2–1	1–2	1–1	2–4	0–0	—

Source: Liga Portugal 2
Legend: Blue = home team win; Yellow = draw; Red = away team win.

=== Positions by round ===
The table lists the positions of teams after each week of matches. In order to preserve chronological evolvements, any postponed matches are not included to the round at which they were originally scheduled, but added to the full round they were played immediately afterwards.

Team ╲ Round	1	2	3	4	5	6	7	8	9	10	11	12	13	14	15	16	17	18	19	20	21	22	23	24	25	26	27	28	29	30	31	32	33	34
Académica	17	17	17	16	17	18	18	18	18	18	18	18	18	18	17	17	17	17	18	18	17	17	18	18	18	18	18	18	18	18	18	18	18	18
Académico de Viseu	6	5	11	14	14	12	8	13	9	5	9	7	11	13	13	14	15	13	14	15	15	15	15	14	15	15	15	15	16	14	14	15	15	15
Benfica B	1	1	1	2	3	3	3	2	1	1	1	1	1	1	1	1	1	1	1	2	2	2	1	2	3	3	3	5	4	5	5	4	5	5
Casa Pia	13	7	10	8	9	4	4	4	4	3	3	3	2	2	3	3	2	2	2	1	1	1	2	1	1	1	2	2	1	2	1	3	2	2
Chaves	9	12	12	10	11	7	9	6	10	11	12	12	9	8	6	6	6	5	5	4	3	3	3	4	4	4	4	3	3	3	3	2	3	3
Estrela da Amadora	16	16	8	11	13	15	13	10	5	6	7	9	12	10	9	10	8	9	7	7	9	10	11	11	11	11	12	13	13	13	13	13	14	14
Farense	15	14	16	17	16	17	17	14	15	15	15	16	14	15	16	13	13	14	15	13	14	14	14	13	13	12	10	10	10	9	10	11	12	11
Feirense	12	6	5	4	2	1	1	1	3	2	2	2	3	3	2	2	3	4	4	5	4	4	4	5	5	5	5	4	5	4	4	5	4	4
Leixões	3	4	3	5	6	9	12	11	6	9	10	10	13	11	12	11	11	11	10	11	10	11	10	7	7	7	7	7	7	7	7	8	7	8
Mafra	4	8	3	4	4	5	7	9	12	12	5	5	7	6	7	8	9	10	11	10	11	9	7	8	10	8	8	8	9	10	11	9	9	9
Nacional	18	10	9	7	10	13	6	8	11	7	6	8	6	7	5	5	5	6	6	6	6	6	6	6	6	6	6	6	6	6	6	6	6	6
Penafiel	7	9	6	9	5	6	5	5	7	8	8	6	5	5	8	9	10	8	9	9	8	8	9	10	8	9	9	9	8	8	8	7	8	7
Porto B	10	15	14	13	7	10	10	7	8	10	11	11	8	12	10	7	7	7	8	8	7	7	8	9	9	10	11	11	11	11	12	12	10	10
Rio Ave	2	3	2	1	1	2	2	3	2	4	4	4	4	4	4	4	4	3	3	3	5	5	5	3	2	2	1	1	2	1	2	1	1	1
Sp. Covilhã	5	2	4	6	8	8	11	12	14	14	13	14	16	16	15	16	16	16	16	16	16	16	16	16	16	16	16	17	14	16	16	16	16	16
Trofense	11	13	13	11	12	11	14	15	13	13	14	13	10	9	11	12	12	12	12	12	13	13	13	15	14	14	14	14	15	17	15	14	13	13
Varzim	8	11	15	15	15	14	15	16	16	17	17	17	17	17	18	18	18	18	17	17	18	18	17	17	17	17	17	16	17	15	17	17	17	17
Vilafranquense	14	18	18	18	18	16	16	17	17	16	16	15	15	14	14	15	14	15	13	14	12	12	12	12	12	13	13	12	12	12	9	10	11	12

Leader and promotion to Primeira Liga
Promotion to Primeira Liga
Qualification to Promotion play-offs
Qualification to Relegation play-offs
Relegation to Liga 3

Source: Liga Portugal (in Portuguese)

== Awards ==
=== Monthly awards ===
Month	Player of the Month		Goalkeeper of the Month		Defender of the Month		Midfielder of the Month		Forward of the Month		Manager of the Month		Goal of the Month	
Month	Player	Club	Player	Club	Player	Club	Player	Club	Player	Club	Manager	Club	Player	Club
August	(Portugal) Guga	Rio Ave	(Brazil) Jhonatan	Rio Ave	(Brazil) Aderllan Santos	Rio Ave	(Portugal) Guga	Rio Ave	(Nigeria) Saviour Godwin	Casa Pia	(Portugal) Luís Freire	Rio Ave		
September	(Brazil) Heliardo	Varzim	(Brazil) Caio Secco	Penafiel	(Brazil) Ícaro Silva	Feirense	(Mali) Samba Koné	Porto B	(Brazil) Heliardo	Varzim	(Portugal) Rui Ferreira	Feirense		
October/November	(Portugal) Jota	Casa Pia	(Portugal) Ricardo Batista	Casa Pia	(Portugal) Vasco Fernandes	Casa Pia	(Portugal) Paulo Bernardo	Benfica B	(Portugal) Jota	Casa Pia	(Portugal) Nélson Veríssimo	Benfica B	(Portugal) Fábio Fortes	Académica
December	(Honduras) Bryan Róchez	Nacional	(Portugal) Ricardo Batista	Casa Pia	(Portugal) Tomás Araújo	Benfica B	(Portugal) João Teixeira	Chaves	(Honduras) Bryan Róchez	Nacional	(Portugal) Vítor Campelos	Chaves	(Portugal) Umaro Embaló	Benfica B
January	(Portugal) João Teixeira	Chaves	(Portugal) Ricardo Batista	Casa Pia	(Brazil) Alexsandro	Chaves	(Portugal) João Teixeira	Chaves	(Brazil) Wellington Carvalho	Chaves	(Portugal) Vítor Campelos	Chaves	(Portugal) Diogo Pinto	Estrela da Amadora
February	(Brazil) João Carlos	Académica	(Portugal) Ricardo Batista	Casa Pia	(Portugal) Vasco Fernandes	Casa Pia	(Portugal) João Teixeira	Chaves	(Brazil) João Carlos	Académica	(Portugal) Filipe Martins	Casa Pia	(Portugal) Traquina	Académica
March	(Portugal) Zé Tiago	Varzim	(Brazil) Jhonatan	Rio Ave	(Portugal) André Almeida	Sp. Covilhã	(Portugal) Zé Tiago	Varzim	(Brazil) João Carlos	Académica	(Portugal) José Mota	Leixões	(Portugal) Tiago Gouveia	Benfica B
April	(Brazil) Edson Farias	Penafiel	(Brazil) Caio Secco	Penafiel	(Brazil) Edson Farias	Penafiel	(Portugal) Guga	Rio Ave	(Brazil) Wellington Carvalho	Chaves	(Portugal) Vítor Campelos	Chaves		

== Number of teams by district ==
Rank	District Football Associations	Number	Teams
1	Porto	6	Leixões, Penafiel, Porto B, Rio Ave, Trofense and Varzim
2	Lisbon	5	Benfica B, Casa Pia, Estrela da Amadora, Mafra and Vilafranquense
3	Aveiro	1	Feirense
3	Castelo Branco	1	Sp. Covilhã
3	Coimbra	1	Académica
3	Faro	1	Farense
3	Funchal	1	Nacional
3	Vila Real	1	Chaves
3	Viseu	1	Académico de Viseu
