= 2020–21 Liga Portugal 2 =

31st season of second-tier football league in Portugal

Liga Portugal 2
- Season: 2020–21
- Dates: 10 September 2020 – 16 May 2021
- Champions: Estoril
- Promoted: Estoril; Vizela; Arouca
- Relegated: Cova da Piedade; Oliveirense
- Matches: 306
- Goals: 741 (2.42 per match)
- Top goalscorer: Cassiano (16 goals)
- Longest unbeaten run: Vizela (26 games)

The 2020–21 Liga Portugal 2, also known as Liga Portugal SABSEG for sponsorship reasons, was the 31st season of Portuguese football's second-tier league, and the first season under the current Liga Portugal 2 title. A total of 18 teams were competing in this division, including reserve sides from top-flight Primeira Liga teams.

== Teams ==
A total of 18 teams contest the league, including 14 sides from the 2019–20 season, 2 teams relegated from the 2019–20 Primeira Liga and 2 promoted from the 2019–20 Campeonato de Portugal.

Vitória de Setúbal and Desportivo das Aves (16th and 18th placed teams in 2019–20 Primeira Liga) were punished by the Portuguese Professional Football League for failing to produce valid licensing documentation with direct relegation to 2020–21 Campeonato de Portugal and, because of that, Cova da Piedade and Casa Pia (17th and 18th placed teams in 2019–20 LigaPro) were not relegated.

=== Team changes ===
Promoted from 2019–20 Campeonato de Portugal

- Arouca
- Vizela

Promoted to 2020–21 Primeira Liga

- Nacional
- Farense

=== Stadium and locations ===
Location of teams in 2020–21 Liga Portugal 2

Team	Location	Stadium	Capacity	2019–20 finish
Académica	Coimbra	Estádio Cidade de Coimbra	29,622	7th
Académico de Viseu	Viseu	Estádio do Fontelo	6,912	8th
Arouca	Arouca	Estádio Municipal de Arouca	5,600	(CP)
Benfica B	Seixal	Benfica Campus	2,644	14th
Casa Pia	Lisbon	Estádio Pina Manique	1,600	18th
Chaves	Chaves	Estádio Municipal Eng.º; Manuel Branco Teixeira	8,396	12th
Cova da Piedade	Cova da Piedade	Estádio Municipal José Martins Vieira	2,230	17th
Estoril	Estoril	Estádio António Coimbra da Mota	8,015	5th
Feirense	Santa Maria da Feira	Estádio Marcolino de Castro	5,401	3rd
Leixões	Matosinhos	Estádio do Mar	9,821	9th
Mafra	Mafra	Estádio Municipal de Mafra	1,257	4th
Oliveirense	Oliveira de Azeméis	Estádio Carlos Osório	1,750	11th
Penafiel	Penafiel	Estádio Municipal 25 de Abril	5,230	15th
Porto B	Vila Nova de Gaia	Estádio Municipal Jorge Sampaio	8,272	13th
Sp. Covilhã	Covilhã	Estádio Municipal José dos Santos Pinto	3,500	10th
Varzim	Póvoa de Varzim	Estádio do Varzim SC	7,280	6th
Vilafranquense	Vila Franca de Xira	Estádio Municipal de Rio Maior	7,000	16th
Vizela	Vizela	Estádio do FC Vizela	6,000	(CP)

=== Personnel and sponsors ===
Team	Head coach	Kit manufacturer
Académica	(Portugal) Rui Borges	(Portugal) Playoff
Académico de Viseu	(Portugal) Zé Gomes	(Italy) Macron
Arouca	(Portugal) Armando Evangelista	(France) Skita
Benfica B	(Portugal) Nélson Veríssimo	(Germany) Adidas
Casa Pia	(Portugal) Filipe Martins	(Italy) Macron
Chaves	(Portugal) Vítor Campelos	(Portugal) Lacatoni
Cova da Piedade	(Portugal) Miguel Leal	(Portugal) Lacatoni
Estoril	(Portugal) Bruno Pinheiro	(Italy) Kappa
Feirense	(Portugal) Rui Ferreira	(Italy) Legea
Leixões	(Portugal) José Mota	(Spain) Luanvi
Mafra	(Portugal) Ricardo Sousa	(Portugal) Lacatoni
Oliveirense	(Portugal) Raúl Oliveira	(Portugal) Rakso
Penafiel	(Portugal) Pedro Ribeiro	(Italy) Macron
Porto B	(Portugal) António Folha	(United States) New Balance
Sp. Covilhã	(Portugal) José Bizarro	(Portugal) Lacatoni
Varzim	(Portugal) António Barbosa	(Portugal) Stadio
Vilafranquense	(Portugal) Carlos Pinto	(Germany) Adidas
Vizela	(Portugal) Álvaro Pacheco	(Portugal) Lacatoni

== Season summary ==
=== League table ===
Pos	Team	Pld	W	D	L	GF	GA	GD	Pts	Promotion or relegation
1	Estoril (C, P)	34	20	10	4	55	26	+29	70	Promotion to Primeira Liga
2	Vizela (P)	34	18	12	4	59	35	+24	66	Promotion to Primeira Liga
3	Arouca (O, P)	34	19	8	7	45	25	+20	65	Qualification to Promotion play-offs
4	Académica	34	17	11	6	46	30	+16	62	
5	Feirense	34	17	7	10	48	33	+15	58	
6	Chaves	34	16	9	9	46	36	+10	57	
7	Penafiel	34	12	10	12	42	42	0	46	
8	Benfica B (I)	34	12	8	14	52	43	+9	44	
9	Casa Pia	34	10	13	11	41	46	−5	43	
10	Leixões	34	10	10	14	35	43	−8	40	
11	Cova da Piedade (R)	34	8	13	13	39	48	−9	37 (Note: Head-to-head points: Cova da Piedade 7, Mafra 6, Sporting Covilhã 2)	Relegation to Liga 3 (Note: Cova da Piedade failed to produce valid licensing documentation to compete in the 2021–22 season of the Liga Portugal 2, so they were punished by the Portuguese Professional Football League with direct relegation to the Liga 3. As a result, Vilafranquense (17th place) were invited to remain in the second tier for the 2021–22 season.)
12	Mafra	34	9	10	15	35	48	−13	37	
13	Sporting da Covilhã	34	8	13	13	36	42	−6	37	
14	Académico de Viseu	34	9	9	16	32	45	−13	36	
15	Varzim	34	9	6	19	26	44	−18	33	
16	Porto B (I)	34	7	11	16	45	52	−7	32	
17	Vilafranquense	34	5	16	13	34	54	−20	31 (Note: Vilafranquense are ranked ahead of Oliveirense on head-to-head away goals: Vilafranquense 0–0 Oliveirense, Oliveirense 2–2 Vilafranquense.)	
18	Oliveirense (R)	34	7	10	17	25	49	−24	31	Relegation to Liga 3

Updated to match(es) played on 22 May 2021. Source: Liga Portugal
Rules for classification: 1) Points; 2) Head-to-head points; 3) Head-to-head goal difference; 4) Head-to-head away goals scored; 5) Goal difference; 6) Matches won; 7) Goals scored; 8) Play-off.
(C) Champions; (I) Ineligible for promotion; (O) Play-off winners; (P) Promoted; (R) Relegated

== Season statistics ==
=== Top goalscorers ===
As of 22 May 2021.

Rank	Player	Club	Goals
1	(Brazil) Cassiano	Vizela	16
2	(Morocco) Mohamed Bouldini	Académica	13
3	(Portugal) João Vieira	Cova da Piedade	12
3	(Ghana) Abdul-Aziz Yakubu	Estoril	12
5	(Ghana) Malik Abubakari	Casa Pia	11
5	(Portugal) Henrique Araújo	Benfica B	11
5	(Nigeria) Abraham Marcus	Feirense	11
5	(Portugal) Gonçalo Ramos	Benfica B	11
9	(Brazil) Nenê	Leixões	10
9	(Brazil) Fabrício Simões	Feirense	10
9	(Portugal) Ronaldo Tavares	Penafiel	10

== Number of teams by district ==
Rank	District Football Associations	Number	Teams
1	Lisbon	5	Benfica B, Casa Pia, Estoril, Mafra and Vilafranquense
2	Porto	4	Leixões, Penafiel, Porto B and Varzim
3	Aveiro	3	Arouca, Feirense and Oliveirense
4	Braga	1	Vizela
4	Castelo Branco	1	Sp. Covilhã
4	Coimbra	1	Académica
4	Setúbal	1	Cova da Piedade
4	Vila Real	1	Chaves
4	Viseu	1	Académico de Viseu
