= 2017–18 LigaPro =

28th season of second-tier football league in Portugal

LigaPro
- Season: 2017–18
- Champions: Nacional; 1st title
- Promoted: Nacional; Santa Clara
- Relegated: União da Madeira; Sporting CP B Gil Vicente; Real
- Matches: 380
- Goals: 947 (2.49 per match)
- Top goalscorer: Ricardo Gomes (21 goals)
- Longest unbeaten run: 16 matches Nacional
- Highest attendance: 20,446; Académica 1–2 Cova da Piedade (5 May 2018)
- Total attendance: 436,178
- Average attendance: 1,148

The 2017–18 LigaPro (also known as Ledman LigaPro for sponsorship reasons) was the 28th season of Portuguese football's second-tier league, and the fourth season under the current LigaPro title. A total of 20 teams competed in this division, including reserve sides from top-flight Primeira Liga teams.

== Teams ==
A total of 20 teams contested the league, including 16 sides from the 2016–17 season, two teams relegated from the 2016–17 Primeira Liga and two promoted from the 2016–17 Campeonato de Portugal.

=== Team changes ===
Promoted from 2016 to 2017 Campeonato de Portugal

- Oliveirense (North zone promotion group winner)
- Real (South zone promotion group winner)

Relegated from 2016 to 2017 Primeira Liga

- Arouca
- Nacional

Promoted to 2017–18 Primeira Liga

- Portimonense
- Desportivo das Aves

Relegated to 2017–18 Campeonato de Portugal

- Vizela
- Fafe
- Freamunde
- Olhanense

=== Stadia and locations ===
Location of teams in 2017–18 LigaPro (Mainland)
Location of teams in 2017–18 LigaPro (Madeira)
Location of teams in 2016–17 LigaPro (Azores)

Team	Location	Stadium	Capacity	2016–17 finish
Académica	Coimbra	Estádio Cidade de Coimbra	29,622	6th
Académico de Viseu	Viseu	Estádio do Fontelo	7,744	17th
Arouca	Arouca	Estádio Municipal de Arouca	5,000	17th (PL)
Benfica B	Seixal	Caixa Futebol Campus	2,720	4th
Braga B	Braga	Estádio 1º de Maio	28,000	7th
Cova da Piedade	Cova da Piedade	Estádio Municipal José Martins Vieira	3,000	16th
Famalicão	Vila Nova de Famalicão	Estádio Municipal 22 de Junho	5,300	15th
Gil Vicente	Barcelos	Estádio Cidade de Barcelos	12,046	13th
Leixões	Matosinhos	Estádio do Mar	9,766	18th
Nacional	Funchal	Estádio da Madeira	5,200	18th (PL)
Oliveirense	Oliveira de Azeméis	Estádio Municipal de Aveiro	32,830	2nd (CP)
Penafiel	Penafiel	Estádio Municipal 25 de Abril	5,320	5th
Porto B	Vila Nova de Gaia	Estádio Municipal Jorge Sampaio	8,270	12th
Real	Queluz	Complexo Desportivo do Real SC	2,415	1st (CP)
Santa Clara	Ponta Delgada	Estádio de São Miguel	13,277	10th
Sporting CP B	Alcochete	CGD Stadium Aurélio Pereira	1,180	14th
Sporting da Covilhã	Covilhã	Estádio Municipal José dos Santos Pinto	2,055	8th
União da Madeira	Funchal	Centro Desportivo da Madeira	2,300	3rd
Varzim	Póvoa de Varzim	Estádio do Varzim SC	7,280	9th
Vitória de Guimarães B	Guimarães	Estádio D. Afonso Henriques	30,000	11th

=== Personnel and sponsors ===
Team	Head coach	Kit manufacturer	Sponsors
Académica	(Portugal) Ricardo Soares	Lacatoni	EFAPEL
Académico de Viseu	(Portugal) Francisco Chaló	Macron	Palácio do Gelo
Arouca	(Portugal) Miguel Leal	Joma	Construções Carlos Pinho
Benfica B	(Portugal) Hélder Cristóvão	Adidas	Emirates
Braga B	(Portugal) João Aroso	Lacatoni	
Cova da Piedade	(Portugal) João Barbosa	Lacatoni	
Famalicão	(Portugal) Dito	Lacatoni	Porminho
Gil Vicente	(Portugal) Álvaro Magalhães	Macron	Barcelos / Crédito Agrícola
Leixões	(Portugal) Kenedy	Luanvi	Câmara Municipal de Matosinhos
Nacional	(Portugal) Costinha	Hummel	Santander Totta
Oliveirense	(Portugal) Pedro Miguel	Rakso	Simoldes
Penafiel	(Portugal) António Conceição	Macron	Restradas
Porto B	(Portugal) José Tavares	New Balance	
Real SC	(Portugal) Filipe Martins	Claw	Junta de Freguesia de Queluz
Santa Clara	(Portugal) Carlos Pinto	Nike	Açoreana Seguros
Sporting CP B	(Portugal) Luís Martins	Macron	NOS
Sporting da Covilhã	(Portugal) José Augusto	Lacatoni	Natura / MB Hotels
União da Madeira	(Portugal) José Viterbo	Lacatoni	Museu CR7
Varzim	(Portugal) João Eusébio	Stadio	Carnes São José
Vitória de Guimarães B	(Portugal) Vítor Campelos	Macron	

=== Coaching changes ===
Team	Outgoing head coach	Manner of departure	Date of vacancy	Position in table	Incoming head coach	Date of appointment
Académica	Costinha	Mutual Consent	22 May 2017	Pre-season	Ivo Vieira	29 May 2017
Académica	Ivo Vieira	Signed by Estoril	13 November 2017	6th	Ricardo Soares	14 November 2017
Académica	Ricardo Soares	Mutual Consent	31 March 2018	5th	Quim Machado	1 April 2018

== Season summary ==
=== League table ===
Pos	Team	Pld	W	D	L	GF	GA	GD	Pts	Promotion or relegation
1	Nacional (C, P)	38	19	14	5	72	45	+27	71	Promotion to the Primeira Liga
2	Santa Clara (P)	38	19	9	10	55	40	+15	66	Promotion to the Primeira Liga
3	Académico de Viseu	38	17	13	8	50	40	+10	64	
4	Académica	38	19	6	13	59	40	+19	63	
5	Penafiel	38	17	11	10	55	43	+12	62	
6	Arouca	38	16	11	11	42	37	+5	59	
7	Porto B	38	18	4	16	50	55	−5	58	Ineligible for promotion
8	Leixões	38	14	14	10	50	43	+7	56	
9	Cova da Piedade	38	14	9	15	42	45	−3	51	
10	Varzim	38	13	11	14	41	41	0	50	
11	Vitória de Guimarães B	38	14	8	16	44	49	−5	50	Ineligible for promotion
12	Oliveirense	38	13	10	15	45	47	−2	49	
13	Benfica B	38	14	7	17	54	60	−6	49	Ineligible for promotion
14	Famalicão	38	13	9	16	46	49	−3	48	
15	Sporting da Covilhã	38	12	11	15	32	41	−9	47	
16	Braga B	38	10	14	14	44	48	−4	44	Ineligible for promotion
17	União da Madeira (R)	38	12	8	18	44	53	−9	44	Relegation to the Campeonato de Portugal
18	Sporting CP B (R)	38	11	9	18	46	65	−19	42	Relegation to the Campeonato de Portugal
19	Gil Vicente (R)	38	8	12	18	29	45	−16	36	Relegation to the Campeonato de Portugal
20	Real (R)	38	8	8	22	47	61	−14	32	Relegation to the Campeonato de Portugal

Source: Liga Portugal
Rules for classification: 1) Points; 2) Head-to-head points; 3) Head-to-head goal difference; 4) Head-to-head away goals scored; 5) Goal difference; 6) Matches won; 7) Goals scored; 8) Play-off.
(Note: The LPFP decided that only criteria 1, 5, 6 and 7 would be applied to establish the classification during the competition.)
(C) Champions; (P) Promoted; (R) Relegated

== Season statistics ==
=== Top goalscorers ===
As of 14 May 2018

Rank	Player	Club	Goals
1	(Cape Verde) Ricardo Gomes	Nacional	21
2	(Brazil) Carlos Vinícius	Real	19
3	(Brazil) Thiago Santana	Santa Clara	15
4	(Portugal) Heriberto Tavares	Benfica B	14
5	(Brazil) Murilo	Nacional	13
6	(Brazil) Dieguinho	Cova da Piedade	12
6	(Angola) Fábio Abreu	Penafiel	12
8	(Brazil) Cléo	Cova da Piedade	11
8	(Cameroon) Donald Djoussé	Académica	11
8	(Brazil) Fernando	Santa Clara	11
8	(Brazil) Sandro Lima	Académico Viseu	11
8	(Colombia) Brayan Riascos	Oliveirense	11
8	(Brazil) Gustavo Costa	Penafiel	11
8	(South Africa) Luther Singh	Braga B	11

==== Hat-tricks ====
Player	For	Against	Result	Date	Ref
(Brazil) Carlos Vinícius	Real	Leixões	4–1 (H)	6 August 2017	
(Angola) Gelson Dala	Sporting B	Santa Clara	4–3 (H)	30 September 2017	
(Angola) Fábio Abreu	Penafiel	Sporting B	4–1 (H)	21 October 2017	
(Brazil) Luan Santos	União da Madeira	Académico Viseu	5–3 (H)	3 December 2017	
(Portugal) João Félix	Benfica B	Famalicão	5–0 (H)	30 January 2018	
(Brazil) Sandro Lima	Académico Viseu	Benfica B	5–1 (A)	11 February 2018	

Note

(H) – Home; (A) – Away

=== Scoring ===
As of 14 May 2018

- First goal of the season:
  - (Algeria) Bilel Aouacheria, for Sporting da Covilhã vs Sporting B (6 August 2017)
- Biggest home win:
  - Famalicão 6–0 Sporting B (25 November 2017)
  - Nacional 6–0 Porto B (7 March 2018)
- Biggest away win:
  - Nacional 0–4 Real (7 October 2017)
  - Benfica B 1–5 Académico Viseu (11 February 2018)
  - Benfica B 0–4 Académica (9 March 2018)
  - União da Madeira 0–4 Benfica B (14 March 2018)
  - Porto B 0–4 Braga B (29 April 2018)
- Highest scoring match: 9 goals
  - Braga B 5–4 Nacional (1 October 2017)
- Biggest winning margin: 6 goals
  - Famalicão 6–0 Sporting B (25 November 2017)
  - Nacional 6–0 Porto B (7 March 2018)
- Most goals scored in a match by a team: 6 goals
  - Famalicão 6–0 Sporting B (25 November 2017)
  - Nacional 6–0 Porto B (7 March 2018)

== Awards ==
=== Monthly awards ===
==== Liga Portugal ====
Month	Player of the Month	
Month	Name	Club
August	(Argentina) Fede Varela	Porto B
September	(Brazil) Galeno	Porto B
October/November	(Portugal) Rui Costa	Famalicão
December	(Portugal) Rui Costa	Famalicão
January	(Portugal) Chiquinho	Académica
February	(Brazil) Carlos Vinícius	Real
March	(Cape Verde) Ricardo Gomes	Nacional
April	(Cape Verde) Ricardo Gomes	Nacional

=== Annual awards ===
==== Liga Portugal ====
===== Player of the Season =====
The Player of the Season was awarded to (Cape Verde) Ricardo Gomes (Nacional).

===== Manager of the Season =====
The Manager of the Season was awarded to (Portugal) Costinha (Nacional).

===== Goalkeeper of the Season =====
The Goalkeeper of the Season was awarded to (Portugal) Ricardo Ribeiro (Académica).

===== Young Player of the Year =====
The Young Player of the Year was awarded to (Portugal) Artur Abreu (Vitória de Guimarães B).

===== Club Fair-Play Prize =====
The Club Fair-Play Prize was awarded to Benfica B.

===== Player Fair-Play Prize =====
The Player Fair-Play Prize was awarded to (Spain) Casillas (Porto).

== Attendances ==
#	Club	Average
1	Académica	4,803
2	Santa Clara	2,031
3	Nacional	1,924
4	Famalicão	1,731
5	Vitória B	1,591
6	Leixões	1,272
7	Varzim	1,230
8	Arouca	992
9	Viseu	978
10	Gil Vicente	962
11	União Madeira	907
12	Penafiel	846
13	Cova da Piedade	784
14	Benfica B	594
15	Porto B	502
16	Real SC	494
17	Oliveirense	378
18	Braga B	363
19	Covilhã	358
20	Sporting B	226
