= 2019–20 LigaPro =

30th season of second-tier football league in Portugal

LigaPro
- Season: 2019–20
- Champions: none
- Promoted: Nacional; Farense
- Relegated: none

The 2019–20 LigaPro was the 30th season of Portuguese football's second-tier league, and the sixth season under the current LigaPro title. A total of 18 teams competed in this division, including reserve sides from top-flight Primeira Liga teams.

On 12 March 2020, the LPFP suspended the league until further notice due to the COVID-19 pandemic in Portugal. On 5 May, the LPFP announced the league would be abandoned, with Farense and Nacional being promoted to the Primeira Liga, while Casa Pia and Cova da Piedade would be relegated to the Campeonato de Portugal in 2020–21. On 29 July, the Portuguese Football Federation announced that the 2019–20 Primeira Liga teams Vitória de Setúbal and Aves would be punished with direct relegation to the Campeonato de Portugal, after failing to provide valid licensing documentation to compete in the professional leagues. As a result, Cova da Piedade and Casa Pia were spared from relegation and allowed to compete in the 2020–21 LigaPro season.

== Teams ==
A total of 18 teams contest the league, including 13 sides from the 2018–19 season, 3 teams relegated from the 2018–19 Primeira Liga and 2 promoted from the 2018–19 Campeonato de Portugal.

=== Team changes ===
Relegated from 2018–19 Primeira Liga

- Chaves
- Nacional
- Feirense

Promoted from 2018–19 Campeonato de Portugal

- Casa Pia
- Vilafranquense

Promoted to 2019–20 Primeira Liga

- Paços de Ferreira
- Famalicão

Relegated to 2019–20 Campeonato de Portugal

- Arouca
- Braga B
- Vitória de Guimarães B

=== Stadium and locations ===
Location of teams in 2019–20 LigaPro
Location of teams in 2019–20 LigaPro (Madeira)

Team	Location	Stadium	Capacity	2018–19 finish
Académica	Coimbra	Estádio Cidade de Coimbra	29,744	5th
Académico de Viseu	Viseu	Estádio do Fontelo	7,744	11th
Benfica B	Seixal	Benfica Campus	2,720	4th
Casa Pia	Lisbon	Estádio Pina Manique	1,600	1st (CP)
Chaves	Chaves	Estádio Municipal Eng. Manuel Branco Teixeira	8,400	16th (PL)
Cova da Piedade	Cova da Piedade	Estádio Municipal José Martins Vieira	2,230	13th
Estoril	Estoril	Estádio António Coimbra da Mota	8,015	3rd
Farense	Faro	Estádio de São Luís	7,000	10th
Feirense	Santa Maria da Feira	Estádio Marcolino de Castro	5,401	18th (PL)
Leixões	Matosinhos	Estádio do Mar	9,766	7th
Mafra	Mafra	Estádio Municipal de Mafra	1,257	14th
Nacional	Funchal	Estádio da Madeira	5,132	17th (PL)
Oliveirense	Oliveira de Azeméis	Estádio Municipal de Aveiro	30,130	12th
Penafiel	Penafiel	Estádio Municipal 25 de Abril	5,230	8th
Porto B	Vila Nova de Gaia	Estádio Municipal Jorge Sampaio	8,272	9th
Sp. Covilhã	Covilhã	Estádio Municipal José dos Santos Pinto	3,500	6th
Varzim	Póvoa de Varzim	Estádio do Varzim SC	7,280	15th
Vilafranquense	Vila Franca de Xira	Estádio Municipal de Rio Maior	6,500	2nd (CP)

=== Personnel and sponsors ===
Team	Head coach	Kit manufacturer	Sponsors
Académica	(Portugal) César Peixoto	(Portugal) Claw	EFAPEL
Académico de Viseu	(Portugal) Rui Borges	(Italy) Macron	Palácio do Gelo
Benfica B	(Portugal) Renato Paiva	(Germany) Adidas	Emirates
Casa Pia	(Portugal) Luís Loureiro	(Italy) Macron	
Chaves	(Portugal) José Mota	(Portugal) Lacatoni	Museu do Pão
Cova da Piedade	(Portugal) Jorge Casquilha	(Portugal) Lacatoni	
Estoril	(Portugal) Tiago Fernandes	(United States) Capelli Sport	EuroBic
Farense	(Portugal) Sérgio Vieira	(Denmark) Hummel	MEO
Feirense	(Portugal) Filipe Martins	(Italy) Legea	Castro Electrónica
Leixões	(Portugal) Carlos Pinto	(Spain) Luanvi	Câmara Municipal de Matosinhos
Mafra	(Portugal) Vasco Seabra	(Portugal) Lacatoni	
Nacional	(Portugal) Luís Freire	(Denmark) Hummel	Santander Totta
Oliveirense	(Portugal) Pedro Miguel	(Portugal) Rakso	Simoldes
Penafiel	(Portugal) Miguel Leal	(Italy) Macron	Restradas
Porto B	(Portugal) Rui Barros	(United States) New Balance	
Sp. Covilhã	(Portugal) Ricardo Soares	(Portugal) Lacatoni	Natura / MB Hotels
Varzim	(Portugal) Paulo Alves	(Portugal) Stadio	Carnes São José
Vilafranquense	(Portugal) Filipe Moreira	(Germany) Adidas	

== Season summary ==
=== League table ===
Pos	Team	Pld	W	D	L	GF	GA	GD	Pts	Promotion or relegation
1	Nacional (P)	24	14	8	2	36	16	+20	50	Promotion to Primeira Liga
2	Farense (P)	24	15	3	6	35	22	+13	48	Promotion to Primeira Liga
3	Feirense	24	11	9	4	27	18	+9	42	
4	Mafra	24	10	9	5	33	24	+9	39	
5	Estoril	24	12	3	9	35	26	+9	39	
6	Varzim	24	10	7	7	32	31	+1	37	
7	Académica	24	10	5	9	34	26	+8	35	
8	Académico de Viseu	24	9	7	8	21	24	−3	34	
9	Leixões	24	8	9	7	23	22	+1	33	
10	Sporting da Covilhã	24	9	5	10	29	27	+2	32	
11	Oliveirense	24	9	5	10	36	31	+5	32	
12	Chaves	24	9	5	10	26	26	0	32	
13	Porto B (Note: Ineligible for promotion)	24	7	8	9	35	36	−1	29	
14	Benfica B	24	7	7	10	31	35	−4	28	
15	Penafiel	24	6	10	8	23	24	−1	28	
16	Vilafranquense	24	6	6	12	27	45	−18	24	
17	Cova da Piedade (Note: On 29 July 2020, the Portuguese Professional Football League punished the 2019–20 Primeira Liga teams Vitória de Setúbal and Aves with direct relegation to the non-professional third-tier Campeonato de Portugal after they failed to provide valid licensing documentation to compete in the professional leagues. As a result, Cova da Piedade and Casa Pia were spared from relegation to the 2020–21 Campeonato de Portugal.)	24	4	5	15	20	42	−22	17	
18	Casa Pia	24	2	5	17	19	47	−28	11	

Updated to match(es) played on 14 June 2020. Source: Liga Portugal
Rules for classification: 1) Points; 2) Head-to-head points; 3) Head-to-head goal difference; 4) Head-to-head away goals scored; 5) Goal difference; 6) Matches won; 7) Goals scored; 8) Play-off.
(P) Promoted

== Awards ==
=== Monthly awards ===
Month	Player of the Month		Goal of the Month		Reference
Month	Player	Club	Player	Club	Reference
August	(Portugal) Adriano Castanheira	Sp. Covilhã	(Portugal) Umaro Embaló	Benfica B	
September	(Portugal) Daniel Bragança	Estoril	(Portugal) Miguel Bandarra	Farense	
October/November	(Brazil) Fabrício Isidoro	Farense	(Portugal) Kikas	Casa Pia	
December	(England) Levi Lumeka	Varzim	(Portugal) Miguel Bandarra	Farense	
January	(Cape Verde) Kukula	Sp. Covilhã	(Colombia) Leonardo Ruiz	Varzim	
February	(Brazil) Agdon	Oliveirense	(Brazil) Rodrigo Dantas	Casa Pia	

=== Annual awards ===
Annual awards were given on 28 August 2020.

Award	Winner	Club
Player of the Season	(Scotland) Ryan Gauld	Farense
Manager of the Season	(Portugal) Joaquim Rodrigues	Nacional
Goal of the Season	(Brazil) Rodrigo Dantas	Casa Pia
Young Player of the Season	(Portugal) Daniel Bragança	Estoril
Top goalscorer	(Brazil) Agdon	Oliveirense
Goalkeeper of the Season	(Brazil) Daniel Guimarães	Nacional
Player Fair-Play Prize	(Portugal) Zé Tiago	Mafra
Club Fair-Play Prize	Casa Pia	
Turf of the Season	Benfica B	

== Number of teams by district ==
Rank	District Football Associations	Number	Teams
1	Lisbon	5	Benfica B, Casa Pia, Estoril, Mafra and Vilafranquense
2	Porto	4	Leixões, Penafiel, Porto B and Varzim
3	Aveiro	2	Feirense and Oliveirense
4	Castelo Branco	1	Sp. Covilhã
4	Coimbra	1	Académica
4	Faro	1	Farense
4	Funchal	1	Nacional
4	Setúbal	1	Cova da Piedade
4	Vila Real	1	Chaves
4	Viseu	1	Académico de Viseu
