= Igor Milioransa =

Brazilian footballer (born 1996)

Personal information
- Date of birth: 12 September 1996 (age 30)
- Place of birth: Itapema, Brazil
- Height: 1.85 m (6 ft 1 in)

Team information
- Current team: Académico de Viseu
- Number: 66

Senior career*
Years	Team	Apps	(Gls)
2016–2019	Osasco Audax	40	(1)
2020	Jaraguá	10	(0)
2020	Vila Nova	0	(0)
2021–2022	Grêmio Anápolis	10	(0)
2021–2022	→ Académico de Viseu (loan)	22	(0)
2022–	Académico de Viseu	84	(0)
- * Club domestic league appearances and goals as of 19:52, 14 November 2026 (UTC)

Igor Milioransa (born 12 September 1996) is a Brazilian professional footballer who plays as a left back for Portuguese club Académico de Viseu.

== Career ==
Born in Itapema in the state of Santa Catarina, Milioransa began playing for Osasco Audax, winning the Campeonato Paulista Série A3 in 2019. After starting 2020 with Jaraguá in the Campeonato Goiano, he moved in June to Vila Nova for the Campeonato Brasileiro Série C. He spent 2021 at Grêmio Anápolis in the same league, a side run by Portuguese agents, who won the title for the first time; he was one of 12 players sold off to Portuguese clubs in the aftermath.

In 2021, Milioransa was loaned to Académico de Viseu in Liga Portugal 2. After a change in manager from Zé Gomes to Pedro Ribeiro, he played more frequently, and in June 2022 he signed a permanent three-year contract. On 27 March 2024, he extended his contract for two more years.

Académico won promotion to the Primeira Liga as runners-up of the 2025–26 Liga Portugal 2. He made his national top-flight debut at nearly 30 on 9 August 2026, a 2–2 draw away to Benfica, and played the next game before losing space in Bruno Pinheiro's team, with loan signing Miguel Ángel Brau and youngster Gustavo Costa competing in the same position.

== Honours ==
Audax Osasco

- Campeonato Paulista Série A3: 2019

Grêmio Anápolis

- Campeonato Goiano: 2021
