= Gustavo Costa =

Gustavo Costa may refer to:

- Gustavo Costa (Brazilian footballer) (born 1995)
- Gustavo Costa (Portuguese footballer) (born 2005)

== See also ==
- Gustavo Costas (born 1963), Argentine football player and manager
