= Daniel Guimarães =

Brazilian footballer (1987–2024)

Personal information
- Full name: Daniel Martins Guimarães
- Date of birth: 18 April 1987
- Place of birth: Timóteo, Minas Gerais, Brazil
- Date of death: 4 October 2024 (aged 37)
- Place of death: Timóteo, Minas Gerais, Brazil
- Height: 1.91 m (6 ft 3 in)
- Position: Goalkeeper

Senior career*
Years	Team	Apps	(Gls)
2009−2010	América Mineiro	3	(0)
2010−2016	Mogi Mirim	83	(0)
2013−2014	→ Ponte Preta (loan)	7	(0)
2016−2017	América de Natal	10	(0)
2017	Red Bull Brasil	2	(0)
2017−2022	Nacional	113	(0)
Total		218	(0)
- * Club domestic league appearances and goals

Daniel Martins Guimarães (18 April 1987 – 4 October 2024) was a Brazilian professional footballer who played as a goalkeeper.

== Career ==
Guimarães began his career with América Mineiro before joining Mogi Mirim in 2010. He played for Ponte Preta on loan in the 2013 and 2014 seasons. He later had stints with América de Natal and Red Bull Brasil.

Guimarães moved to Portuguese club Nacional in 2017. He agreed a contract extension with Nacional in May 2020. Guimarães suspended his career due to cancer in the 2020–21 season. He briefly returned to playing in the 2022–23 season, making 11 appearances, before suffering a relapse.

== Death ==
Guimarães died from cancer on 4 October 2024, at the age of 37.

== Honours ==
América Mineiro

- Campeonato Brasileiro Série C: 2009

Nacional

- LigaPro: 2017–18, 2019–20
