= Dragi (name) =

Dragi is a South Slavic masculine given name.

- Dragi Kotsev, Macedonian footballer
- Dragi Setinov, a retired Macedonian football player
- Dragi Jovanović, Serbian politician and Axis collaborator
- Dragi Kanatlarovski, a retired Yugoslav and Macedonian football player
