= Celsinho =

Celsinho may refer to:

- Celsinho (footballer, born 1950), Brazilian football forward Celso Ferreira
- Celsinho (footballer, born March 1988), Brazilian football defender Celsonil Santos de Macedo Júnior
- Celsinho (footballer, born August 1988), Brazilian football midfielder Celso Luís Honorato Júnior
- Celsinho (footballer, born 1996), Portuguese football defender Celso Casimiro Domingos
