= Miguel Bandarra =

Portuguese footballer (born 1996)

Personal information
- Full name: Miguel Bandarra Rodrigues
- Date of birth: 17 January 1996 (age 30)
- Place of birth: Vila Real de Santo António, Portugal
- Height: 1.80 m (5 ft 11 in)
- Position: Right-back

Team information
- Current team: Os Belenenses
- Number: 22

Youth career
- 2005–2011: Lusitano VRSA
- 2011–2012: Sporting
- 2012–2013: Lusitano VRSA
- 2013–2014: Olhanense
- 2014–2015: Lusitano VRSA

Senior career*
Years	Team	Apps	(Gls)
2014–2015	Lusitano VRSA	22	(4)
2015–2016	Pedras Salgadas	15	(1)
2016	Lusitano VRSA	14	(3)
2016–2017	Louletano	29	(1)
2017–2018	Armacenenses	26	(8)
2018–2019	Casa Pia	38	(10)
2019–2023	Farense	67	(3)
2023–2025	Académico de Viseu	47	(2)
2025–	Os Belenenses	25	(0)
- * Club domestic league appearances and goals as of 7 May 2026

Miguel Bandarra Rodrigues (born 17 January 1996) is a Portuguese professional footballer who plays as a right-back for Liga 3 club Os Belenenses.

== Football career ==
He made his Taça da Liga debut for Farense on 27 July 2019 in a game against Académica.
