= Marcelinho (footballer, born August 1984) =

Bulgaria footballer

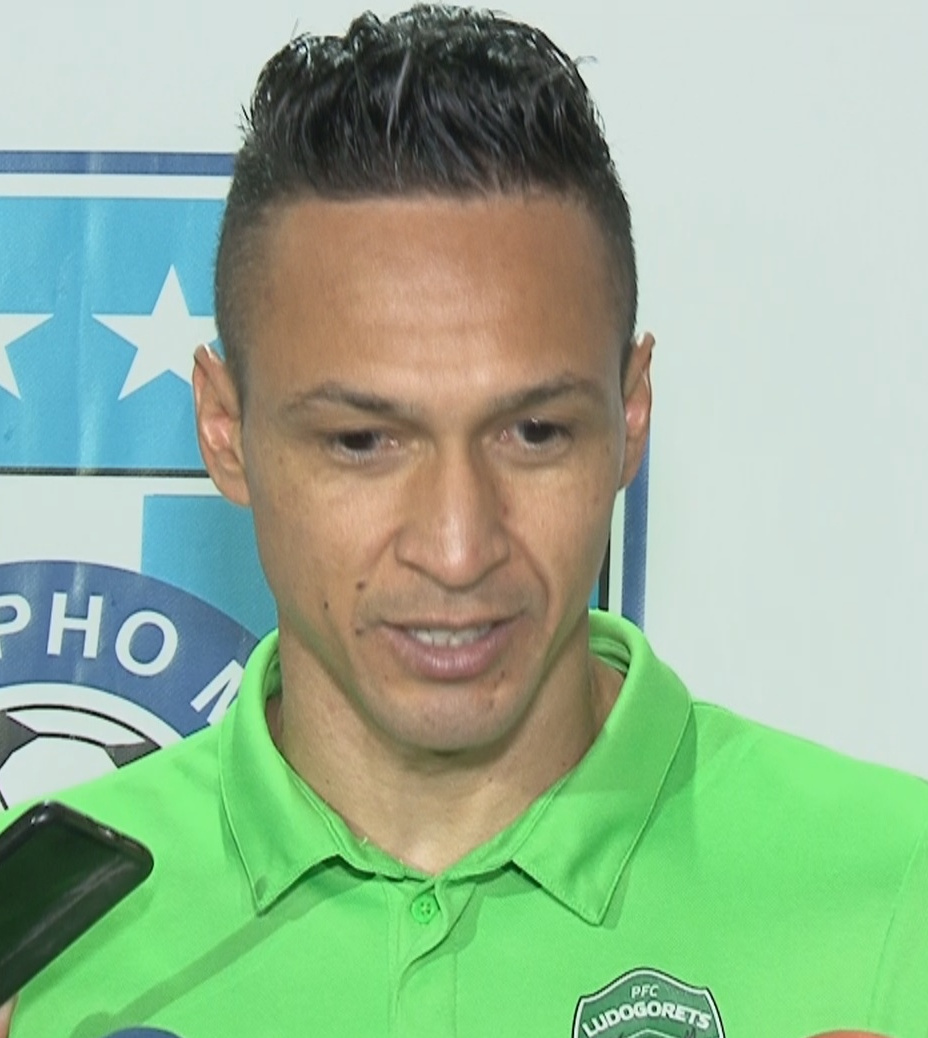
- Marcelinho in 2019

Personal information
- Full name: Marcelo Nascimento da Costa
- Date of birth: 24 August 1984 (age 42)
- Place of birth: Manacapuru, Amazonas, Brazil
- Height: 1.77 m (5 ft 10 in)
- Position: Attacking midfielder

Youth career
- 2001–2002: Rio Negro
- 2002–2005: São Paulo

Senior career*
| Years | Team | Apps | (Gls) |
| 2005 | Cascavel | 0 | (0) |
| 2006 | Santacruzense | 0 | (0) |
| 2007 | São Caetano | 0 | (0) |
| 2008 | Catanduvense | 0 | (0) |
| 2008–2009 | Al-Nasr Dubai | 12 | (0) |
| 2010 | Mogi Mirim | 0 | (0) |
| 2010–2011 | Bragantino | 24 | (4) |
| 2011–2020 | Ludogorets Razgrad | 234 | (75) |
| 2020–2021 | Vitória | 26 | (1) |
| 2021 | Manaus | 9 | (1) |
| 2021–2022 | Operário | 17 | (3) |
| 2023 | Princesa-AM | 19 | (2) |
| Total | | 324 | (83) |

International career
| 2016–2019 | Bulgaria | 11 | (2) |
- * Club domestic league appearances and goals

Marcelo Nascimento da Costa (Bulgarian: Марсело Насименто да Коща; born 24 August 1984), commonly known as Marcelinho (Bulgarian: Марселиньо), is a former Brazilian-born naturalized Bulgarian professional footballer who played as a midfielder.

A youth product of São Paulo, Marcelinho played for Cascavel, Santacruzense, São Caetano and Catanduvense in his early career. In 2008 he signed with UAE Pro-League club Al-Nasr Dubai. In early 2010, he returned to his home country, joining Mogi Mirim. Few months later Marcelinho signed with Bragantino, before moving to Ludogorets in May 2011. With Ludogorets, he has won nine consecutive Bulgarian league titles from 2012 to 2020, as well as two Bulgarian Cups, and four Bulgarian Supercups. With 80 matches played, he holds the record for the most appearances for a Bulgarian team in European tournaments.

Born and raised in Brazil, Marcelinho received Bulgarian citizenship in 2013, and subsequently opted to play internationally for the Bulgarian national team. He made his debut for Bulgaria in a friendly against Portugal on 26 March 2016.

== Club career ==
=== Early career ===
Marcelinho joined São Paulo as a seventeen-year-old, but he failed to break into the first-team. Since leaving São Paulo in early 2005 he has played for Cascavel, Santacruzense, São Caetano and Catanduvense. In 2008, Marcelinho joined Al Nasr in Dubai.

=== Mogi Mirim ===
After one season, Marcelinho left the UAE League side Al Nasr and signed for Mogi Mirim. In the first half of 2010 he earned 15 appearances in the Campeonato Paulista. Marcelinho made his debut in a 5–1 away loss against Palmeiras on 16 January 2010.

=== Bragantino ===
In July 2010, Marcelinho signed with Clube Atlético Bragantino, where he played 24 matches and scored four goals to the end of the season in the Campeonato Brasileiro Série B. Marcelinho made his first-team debut in a 2–0 home defeat at Ponte Preta on 31 July. In 2011, he appeared 17 times for Bragantino in the Campeonato Paulista, scoring one goal. Marcelinho netted his first goal of 2011 as he scored the winning strike in a 2–1 home victory over Santos on 19 March.

=== Ludogorets Razgrad ===
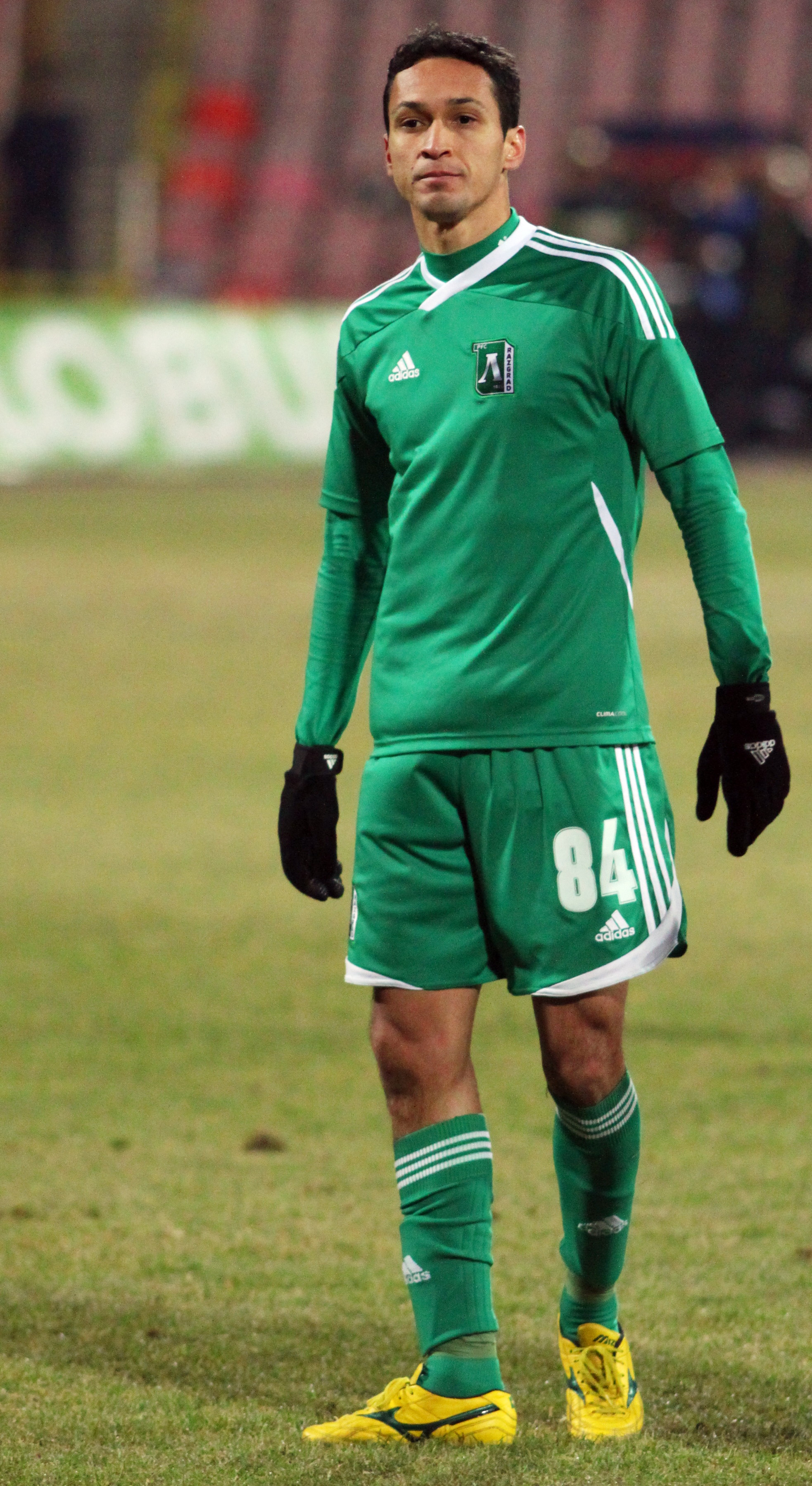
Marcelinho playing for Ludogorets in 2011

On 12 May 2011, Marcelinho joined Bulgarian team Ludogorets Razgrad on a three-year deal and was assigned the number 84 jersey. His debut came in Ludogorets's opening match in the 2011–12 season, at home to Lokomotiv Plovdiv on 6 August. Two weeks later, on 20 August, he scored his first competitive goals for Ludogorets, netting twice in a 4–0 win over Vidima-Rakovski. On 16 May 2012, Marcelinho was named "Man of the match" in a 2–1 win against Lokomotiv Plovdiv in the 2012 Bulgarian Cup Final. He scored both Ludogorets goals late in the match to turn around what had appeared to be a certain defeat for Ludogorets at the hands of Lokomotiv. In the league, Marcelinho scored nine goals and collected his first A Group title winner's medal at the end of his first season in Bulgaria.

Marcelinho started the 2012–13 season by scoring the third goal in Ludogorets 3–1 win against Lokomotiv Plovdiv in the 2012 Bulgarian Supercup on 11 July. A week later, he scored his first-ever Champions League goal, opening the scoring in a 1–1 home draw against Dinamo Zagreb in their second qualifying round first leg tie. He ended the campaign with nine goals in all competitions.

On 19 December 2013, Marcelinho was named the Best foreign player in the Bulgarian league.

On 1 October 2014, Marcelinho scored a stunning goal in the 6th minute during Ludogorets' home debut in the 2014–15 Champions League group phase against the current Champions League champion Real Madrid, but in an eventual 2–1 loss. A few days later, he signed a one-year contract extension, keeping him at Ludogorets until 2016. On 19 April 2015, Marcelinho made his 100th league appearance for Ludogorets in a 3–1 home win over Litex Lovech. On 1 October 2017, he opened the scoring in an A PFG match against Beroe, managing his 57th goal in the league (in 171 matches) and thus overtaking the tally of fellow naturalized Brazilian Marquinhos, which allowed him to become the foreign footballer with the most goals in the top Bulgarian division. Marcelinho's record was subsequently itself surpassed by teammate Claudiu Keșerü. In mid July 2019, he was frozen out of the first team by manager Stoycho Stoev, following a number of disciplinary breaches. He returned to first team action on 18 August, as a substitute in the match against Cherno More Varna, providing an assist, but also being sent off for a second booking.

On 28 June 2020, Marcelinho announced that he would leave the club after nine years, despite his desire to stay in the club for one more year. Ludogorets subsequently retired the number 84 in his honour for his service to the club.

== International career ==
On 24 January 2013, Marcelinho received a Bulgarian passport from the local authorities and became eligible to play for the Bulgaria national team. He later stated in an interview that he would be happy to represent Bulgaria at international level.

On 7 March 2016, Marcelinho was called up for the first time to the Bulgaria national team for the friendly matches against Portugal and Macedonia. He scored on his international debut at Estádio Dr. Magalhães Pessoa against Portugal on 25 March, scoring the only goal for a 1–0 win. Despite his good performance with the team Marcelinho never received call-ups from Ivaylo Petev's successor Petar Hubchev as he did not want naturalized players in the team.

In 2019 the new national manager Krasimir Balakov once again picked Marcelinho as part of the squad for the UEFA Euro 2020 Qualifications matches on 7 and 10 June against Czech Republic and Kosovo, though he had to withdraw due to an injury.

== Personal life ==
His brother, Gustavo Costa, is also a footballer who last played for Levadiakos and is the brother-in-law of Farul Constanța player Rivaldinho and son-in-law of former Brazil and FC Barcelona player, Rivaldo.

== Career statistics ==
=== Club ===
As of 22 June 2020

Appearances and goals by club, season and competition
| Club | Season | League | | | Cup (Note: Includes Copa do Brasil.) | | Continental | | Other (Note: Includes Campeonato Paulista and Bulgarian Supercup.) | | Total | |
| Club | Season | Division | Apps | Goals | Apps | Goals | Apps | Goals | Apps | Goals | Apps | Goals |
|---|---|---|---|---|---|---|---|---|---|---|---|---|
| Al-Nasr Dubai | 2008–09 | UAE Pro-League | 12 | 0 | 0 | 0 | — | | — | | 12 | 0 |
| Mogi Mirim | 2010 | Série B | 0 | 0 | 0 | 0 | — | | 15 | 0 | 15 | 0 |
| Bragantino | 2010 | Série B | 24 | 4 | 0 | 0 | — | | 0 | 0 | 24 | 4 |
| Bragantino | 2011 | Série B | 0 | 0 | 0 | 0 | — | | 17 | 1 | 17 | 1 |
| Bragantino | Total | | 24 | 4 | 0 | 0 | 0 | 0 | 17 | 1 | 41 | 5 |
| Ludogorets Razgrad | 2011–12 | A Group | 25 | 9 | 4 | 4 | — | | — | | 29 | 13 |
| Ludogorets Razgrad | 2012–13 | A Group | 25 | 6 | 0 | 0 | 2 | 2 | 1 | 1 | 28 | 9 |
| Ludogorets Razgrad | 2013–14 | A Group | 32 | 9 | 7 | 1 | 15 | 2 | 1 | 0 | 55 | 12 |
| Ludogorets Razgrad | 2014–15 | A Group | 22 | 8 | 5 | 0 | 12 | 3 | 1 | 1 | 40 | 12 |
| Ludogorets Razgrad | 2015–16 | A Group | 26 | 7 | 1 | 0 | 1 | 0 | 1 | 0 | 29 | 7 |
| Ludogorets Razgrad | 2016–17 | Parva Liga | 32 | 14 | 2 | 1 | 13 | 0 | 0 | 0 | 47 | 15 |
| Ludogorets Razgrad | 2017–18 | Parva Liga | 27 | 9 | 3 | 0 | 11 | 3 | 1 | 0 | 42 | 12 |
| Ludogorets Razgrad | 2018–19 | Parva Liga | 29 | 8 | 2 | 0 | 14 | 4 | 1 | 0 | 46 | 12 |
| Ludogorets Razgrad | 2019–20 | Parva Liga | 16 | 5 | 2 | 0 | 12 | 1 | 1 | 0 | 31 | 6 |
| Ludogorets Razgrad | Total | | 234 | 75 | 26 | 6 | 80 | 15 | 7 | 2 | 347 | 98 |
| Career total | | | 271 | 79 | 26 | 6 | 80 | 15 | 39 | 3 | 415 | 103 |

=== International ===
As of match played 17 November 2019

Appearances and goals by national team and year
| National team | Year | Apps | Goals |
|---|---|---|---|
| Bulgaria | 2016 | 7 | 2 |
| Bulgaria | 2017 | 0 | 0 |
| Bulgaria | 2018 | 0 | 0 |
| Bulgaria | 2019 | 4 | 0 |
| Total | | 11 | 2 |

Scores and results list Bulgaria's goal tally first, score column indicates score after each Marcelinho goal.

List of international goals scored by Marcelinho
| No. | Date | Venue | Opponent | Score | Result | Competition |
|---|---|---|---|---|---|---|
| 1 | 26 March 2016 | Estádio Dr. Magalhães Pessoa, Leiria, Portugal | Portugal | 1–0 | 1–0 | Friendly |
| 2 | 6 September 2016 | Vasil Levski National Stadium, Sofia, Bulgaria | Luxembourg | 2–2 | 4–3 | 2018 FIFA World Cup qualification |

== Honours ==
Ludogorets

- Bulgarian First League (9): 2011–12, 2012–13, 2013–14, 2014–15, 2015–16, 2016–17, 2017–18, 2018–19, 2019–20
- Bulgarian Cup: 2011–12, 2013–14
- Bulgarian Supercup: 2012, 2014, 2018, 2019

Individual

- Best foreign player in the A Group: 2013
- Best midfielder in the Bulgarian First League: 2017
- Players' Player of the Year in the A Group: 2015, 2017
- As of 29 November 2018, Ludogorets' all-time leader in league appearances (218) and European goals (14).
