= Rúben Pereira (footballer) =

Portuguese footballer (born 1998)

Personal information
- Full name: Rúben Filipe Gomes Pereira
- Date of birth: 19 April 1998 (age 28)
- Place of birth: Espinho, Portugal
- Height: 1.93 m (6 ft 4 in)
- Position: Centre back

Team information
- Current team: Académico de Viseu
- Number: 44

Youth career
- 2006–2009: Espinho
- 2009–2010: Arcozelo
- 2010–2011: Coimbrões
- 2011–2012: Benfica
- 2012: Feirense
- 2013: Espinho
- 2013–2015: Boavista
- 2015–2017: Rio Ave

Senior career*
Years	Team	Apps	(Gls)
2017–2018	Esmoriz	33	(2)
2018–2021	Sanjoanense	65	(0)
2021–2023	Chaves	2	(0)
2021–2022	→ Pedras Salgadas (loan)	13	(2)
2022–2023	→ Trofense (loan)	20	(2)
2023–2025	Penafiel	59	(2)
2025–	Académico de Viseu	16	(2)
- * Club domestic league appearances and goals as of 21:24, 13 November 2026 (UTC)

Rúben Filipe Gomes Pereira (born 19 April 1998) is a Portuguese professional footballer who plays as a centre back for Primeira Liga club Académico de Viseu.

== Career ==
Born in Espinho, Pereira began playing as a youth for local S.C. Espinho, and had spells as a teenager with several other clubs including Benfica, Boavista and Rio Ave. He made his senior debut in the Aveiro Football Association's district league with Esmoriz in 2017–18, before spending three years with Sanjoanense in the Campeonato de Portugal, then the third tier.

In 2021, Pereira signed for Chaves, and made three appearances as the team won promotion from Liga Portugal 2 via the playoffs; he spent most of the season on loan to farm team Pedras Salgadas. On 9 August 2022, he was loaned to Trofense again in the second tier. He signed a two-year deal at Penafiel in the same division on 8 July 2023.

On 23 June 2025, Pereira was the first signing of the summer for Académico de Viseu also in Liga Portugal 2, on a two-year deal. He played 14 league games in his first season, scoring in a 2–0 home win over Penafiel on 29 November, as his team won promotion as runners-up. Aged 28, he made his Primeira Liga debut on 9 August 2026 and scored in a 2–2 draw away to Benfica in his team's first top-flight game in 37 years.
