= Gustavo Costa (Brazilian footballer) =

Brazilian footballer (born 1995)

Gustavo
Personal information
- Full name: Gustavo Nascimento da Costa
- Date of birth: 20 March 1995 (age 31)
- Place of birth: Manacapuru, Brazil
- Height: 1.77 m (5 ft 10 in)
- Position: Midfielder

Team information
- Current team: Levadiakos
- Number: 23

Youth career
- –2014: Mogi Mirim

Senior career*
Years	Team	Apps	(Gls)
2014–2016	Mogi Mirim	23	(1)
2016–2018	Portimonense	18	(1)
2017–2018	→ Penafiel (loan)	36	(11)
2018–2019	Estoril	6	(0)
2019	Penafiel	13	(2)
2019–2020	Cova da Piedade	15	(2)
2020–2022	Olympiakos Nicosia	55	(6)
2022	Al-Khor	0	(0)
2023–2024	Farul Constanța	1	(0)
2024–	Levadiakos	8	(0)
- * Club domestic league appearances and goals as of 30 March 2024

Gustavo Nascimento da Costa (born 20 March 1995), known as Gustavo, is a Brazilian professional footballer who plays as a midfielder for Greek Super League club Levadiakos.

== Career ==
Gustavo made his professional debut in the Campeonato Brasileiro Série B for Mogi Mirim on 9 May 2015 in a game against Criciúma.

In January 2024, Costa joined Super League Greece 2 club Levadiakos on an eighteen-month contract.

== Personal life ==
His brother is the former Bulgarian international Marcelinho. He is the brother-in-law of Farul Constanța player Rivaldinho and son-in-law of former Brazil and FC Barcelona player, Rivaldo.

== Honours ==
Portimonense

- LigaPro: 2016–17

Olympiakos Nicosia

- Cypriot Cup runner-up: 2020–21
