= Dragi Kocev =

Macedonian footballer (born 1987)

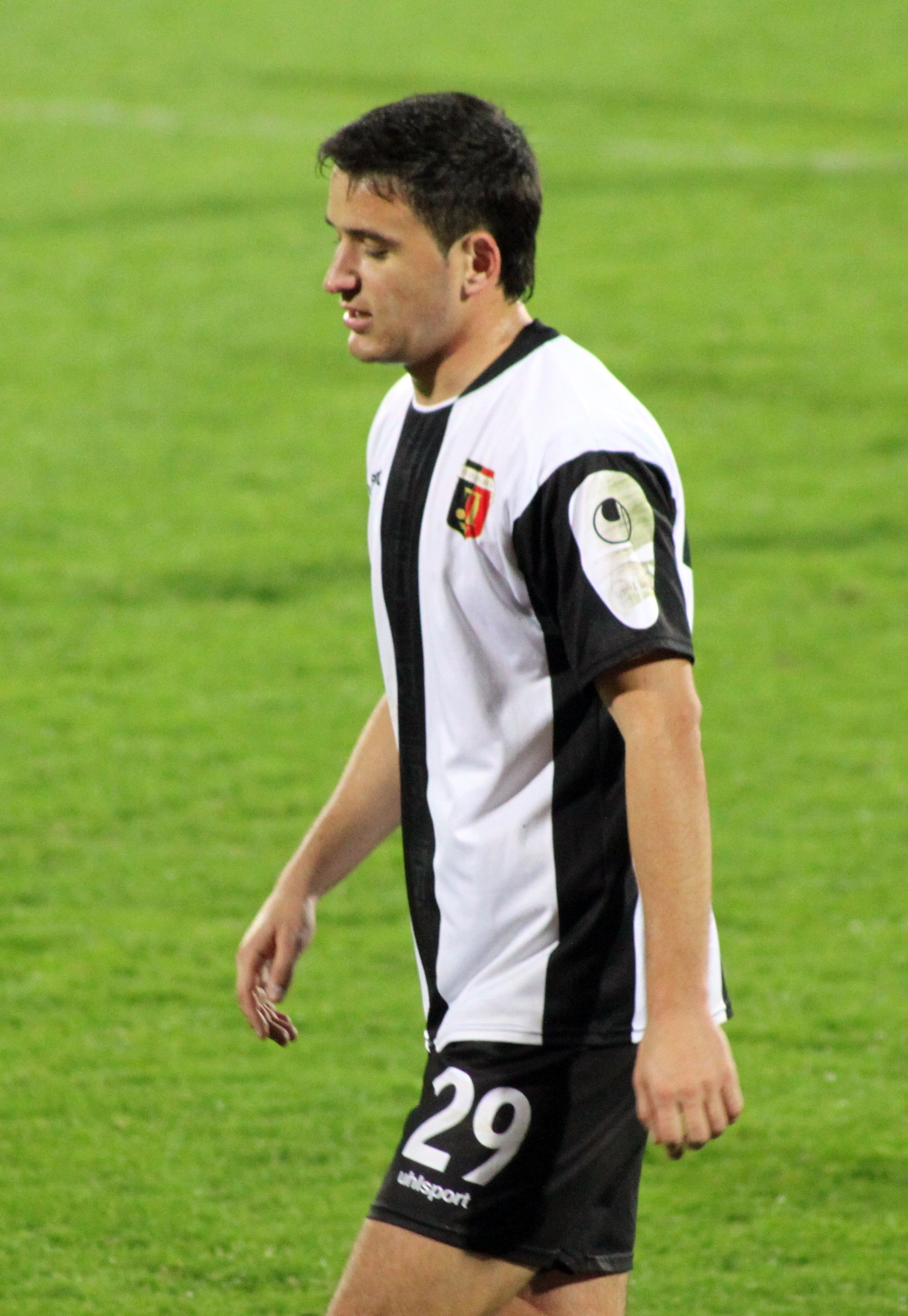

Personal information
- Full name: Dragi Kocev; Драги Коцев
- Date of birth: 25 February 1987 (age 39)
- Place of birth: Radoviš, SR Macedonia
- Height: 1.84 m (6 ft 0 in)
- Position: Winger

Youth career
- 1995–2001: FK Jaka
- 2001–2004: Pirin Blagoevgrad

Senior career*
Years	Team	Apps	(Gls)
2004–2010	Pirin Blagoevgrad	106	(12)
2007–2008	→ Pirin GD (loan)	19	(8)
2010–2013	Lokomotiv Plovdiv	48	(2)
2012–2013	→ Pirin GD (loan)	24	(1)
2013	Pirin GD	12	(0)
2014–2015	Pirin Blagoevgrad	33	(5)

International career
2005–2006	Macedonia U19		
- * Club domestic league appearances and goals as of 4 June 2015

Dragi Kocev (Macedonian: Драги Коцев; born 25 February 1987 in Radoviš, SFR Yugoslavia) is a Macedonian footballer who plays as an attacking midfielder.

In June 2005, he received a Bulgarian passport. In 2005 and 2006 Kocev was a member of the Macedonian national under-19 football team.

== Club career ==
Born in Radoviš, Kocev start to play football in local club FK Jaka. When he was only 14 years old he went to Blagoevgrad, together with his compatriot Zoran Zlatkovski, and their first club in Bulgaria was Pirin Blagoevgrad, where they progressed through the youth ranks before becoming part of the senior side. Kocev made his A PFG debut in 2004. During the season 2007/08 Kocev was loaned to Pirin Gotse Delchev and played one year in Bulgarian second division.

=== Lokomotiv Plovdiv ===
Kocev signed with Lokomotiv Plovdiv on 26 July 2010 on a two-year deal. He made his debut on 31 July in a 1–1 away draw against Vidima-Rakovski. Kocev scored his first A PFG goal for Lokomotiv in a 3–0 win against Akademik Sofia on 6 November.
