= Vítor Campelos =

Portuguese football manager (born 1975)

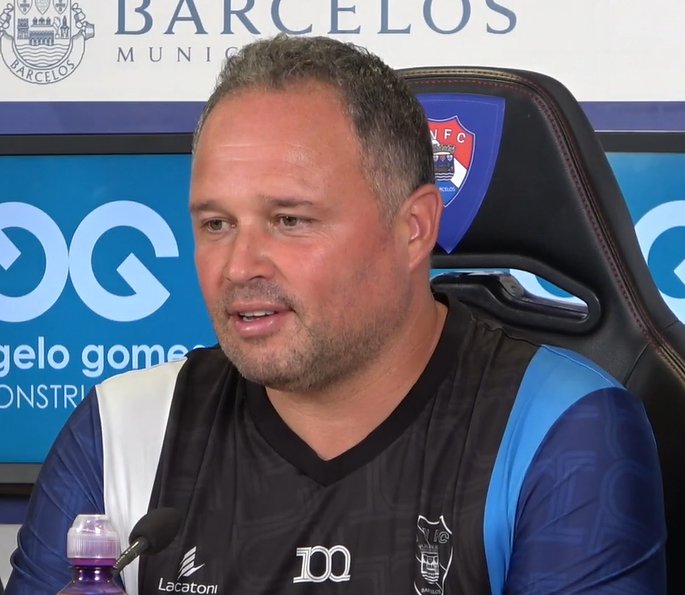
- Campelos as manager of Gil Vicente in 2023

Personal information
- Full name: Vítor Fernando de Carvalho Campelos
- Date of birth: 11 May 1975 (age 51)
- Place of birth: Guimarães, Portugal

Team information
- Current team: Celje (manager)

Managerial career
- Years: Team
- 2013–2014: Fehérvár II
- 2015: Trofense
- 2015–2018: Vitória Guimarães B
- 2018: Vitória Guimarães (interim)
- 2019: Moreirense
- 2020: Al-Taawoun
- 2021–2023: Chaves
- 2023–2024: Gil Vicente
- 2024: AVS
- 2026–: Celje

Vítor Fernando de Carvalho Campelos (born 11 May 1975) is a Portuguese professional football manager who is in charge of Slovenian PrvaLiga club Celje.

After working as an assistant to Toni in the Middle East, he managed in his own right from 2013, leading Vitória Guimarães, Moreirense, Chaves and Gil Vicente in the Portuguese Primeira Liga.

== Career ==
=== Early career ===
Born in Guimarães, Campelos began his career in the staff of José Manuel Gomes at F.C. Paços de Ferreira and Leixões SC. From 2007 to 2013, Campelos worked as an assistant manager to compatriot Toni at Saudi Arabian side Ettifaq FC, Sharjah FC in the United Arab Emirates, Al-Ittihad Club in Saudi Arabia and Tractor S.C. in Iran. In 2013, he was given his first outright managerial job, at the reserve team of Hungary's Fehérvár FC in the country's third division.

On 19 January 2015, Campelos was appointed at C.D. Trofense in his country's Segunda Liga; the team were last after 23 games. In his first game as a professional manager six days later, he lost 2–0 at home to S.L. Benfica B.

=== Vitória Guimarães and Moreirense ===
After relegation, Campelos moved in June 2015 to his hometown team Vitória S.C. B. He left in May 2018, having kept them in the second tier in each of his three seasons with finishes of 13th, 11th and 11th; He led the first team on an interim basis after the resignation of Pedro Martins, losing 3–2 at C.S. Marítimo in his only game on 24 February 2018.

In May 2019, Campelos was appointed manager of Primeira Liga club Moreirense FC, replacing Ivo Vieira. He left by mutual accord on 16 December.

On 15 January 2020, Campelos returned to the Saudi Professional League with Al Taawoun FC, replacing fellow Portuguese Paulo Sérgio. He lost his job at the end of August, with six consecutive defeats out of a record of three wins in 15.

=== Chaves ===
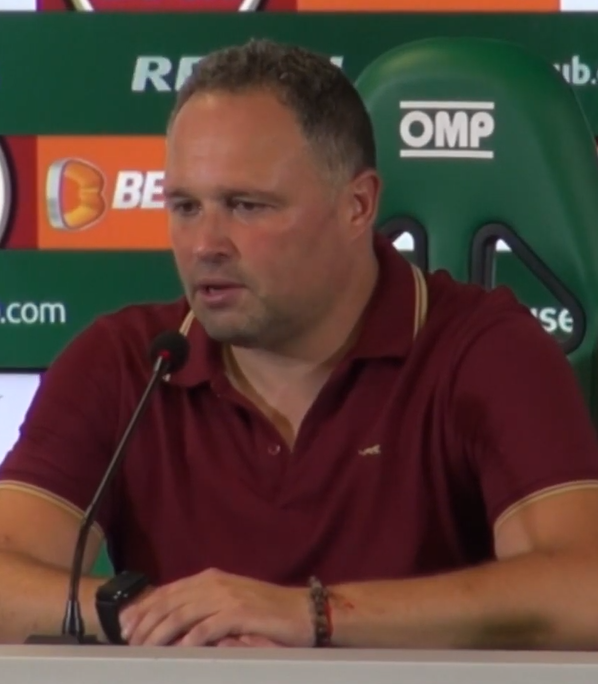
Campelos as manager of Chaves in 2022

Campelos went back to Portugal's second tier on 11 February 2021, succeeding Carlos Pinto at fifth-placed G.D. Chaves. In 2021–22, he won the league's Manager of the Month in December, January and April as the team finished third and returned to the top-flight after a three-year absence with a 2–1 aggregate win over his former club Moreirense in the promotion/relegation play-offs.

In 2022–23, Campelos led the Trás-os-Montes team to seventh place with 46 points, one fewer than their all-time best five years earlier. Highlights included a 1–0 home win over eventual champions S.L. Benfica on 15 April. The team were in contention until the final day for sixth place, which would have guaranteed a first ever European season in the UEFA Europa Conference League, but the club's board had not registered with UEFA before the deadline.

Campelos was linked with EFL Championship teams Hull City and Cardiff City. He said he was "99 per cent" on the way to Cardiff, before owner Vincent Tan hired another manager. He left Chaves on 2 June 2023.

=== Gil Vicente ===
On 30 June 2023, Campelos signed a one-year deal at Gil Vicente F.C. in the same league. On 7 April 2024, after six winless matches, he rescinded his contract.

== Managerial statistics ==
As of 12 September 2026

Team	From	To	Record					
Team	From	To	G	W	D	L	Win %	Ref.
Trofense	19 January 2015	20 April 2015	17	3	3	11	17.65	
Vitória Guimarães B	1 July 2015	21 September 2015	8	1	5	2	12.50	
Vitória Guimarães B	22 December 2015	30 June 2018	103	40	19	44	38.83	
Vitória Guimarães (caretaker)	21 February 2018	27 February 2018	1	0	0	1	0.00	
Moreirense	1 July 2019	16 December 2019	17	5	5	7	29.41	
Al.Taawoun	15 January 2020	30 August 2020	16	3	4	9	18.75	
Chaves	11 February 2021	30 June 2023	91	38	27	26	41.76	
Gil Vicente	1 July 2023	8 April 2024	33	10	7	16	30.30	
AVS	1 July 2024	12 November 2024	12	3	4	5	25.00	
Celje	13 March 2026	Present	25	13	5	7	52.00	
Total			323	116	79	128	35.91	—

== Honours ==
Celje

- Slovenian PrvaLiga: 2025–26
