= Académico de Viseu F.C. =

Portuguese football club

Académico de Viseu
- Full name: Académico de Viseu Futebol Clube
- Nickname: Os Viriatos
- Founded: 1914; 112 years ago 2005; 21 years ago (refounded as Merger club)
- Ground: Estádio do Fontelo
- Capacity: 6,912
- Owner: Dietmar Hopp
- Chairman: Mariano Maroto Lopez
- Manager: Bruno Pinheiro
- League: Primeira Liga
- 2025–26: Liga Portugal 2, 2nd of 18 (promoted)
- Website: academicodeviseu.pt
| Home colours | Away colours |

Académico de Viseu Futebol Clube, commonly known as Académico de Viseu, is a Portuguese professional football club based in Viseu. Founded in 1914 as Clube Académico de Futebol, the club went through several changes over the course of the years, folding in 2005 due to financial troubles and re-founding under its current name. The club currently play in the Primeira Liga, following promotion in the 2025-26 season. They hold their home games at Estádio do Fontelo.

== History ==
In 2005, Clube Académico de Futebol, an historic founded officially in 1914 which competed in four top division seasons in the 1980s (the last being 1988–89), folded due to financial problems. In September 2005, Clube Académico de Futebol and G.D. Farminhão signed a protocol which made the latter change its name to "Académico de Viseu Futebol Clube", its headquarters to Viseu, its stadium to Estádio do Fontelo and its logo and colours to be the same as the extinct Clube Académico de Futebol, thus preserving the former and historic Clube Académico de Futebol.

Académico de Viseu Futebol Clube started competing again immediately in the Viseu first regional league, achieving promotion to the fourth tier Terceira Divisão in their second season in 2007.

In the last match of the 2008–09 season, after a 2–0 win against Anadia FC, the team was promoted to the third division, a feat which was accomplished on goal difference. They would, however, be immediately relegated back.

In the 2012–13 season the team achieved promotion to the Segunda Liga and achieved a solid 11th place in the following season. In 2014–15, they remained in this division.

In the 2022–23 season the team created history finishing 4th in Liga Portugal 2, make the quarter finals in Taça de Portugal and the semi final in Taça de Liga.

== Players ==
=== Current squad ===
As of 9 September 2026

Note: Flags indicate national team as defined under FIFA eligibility rules; some limited exceptions apply. Players may hold more than one non-FIFA nationality.

| No. | Pos. | Nation | Player |
|---|---|---|---|
| 1 | GK | ESP | Marcos Lavín |
| 2 | DF | GRE | Nikos Michelis |
| 3 | DF | ESP | Miguel Ángel Brau (on loan from Coventry City) |
| 5 | DF | BRA | Pedro Barcelos |
| 6 | MF | POR | André Ceitil |
| 7 | MF | POR | Luís Silva (captain) |
| 8 | MF | TUR | Cihan Kahraman |
| 9 | FW | MAR | Mohamed Bouldini |
| 10 | FW | CRC | Álvaro Zamora (on loan from Aris) |
| 12 | GK | ESP | Juan Soriano |
| 14 | MF | GER | Soufiane Messeguem (vice-captain) |
| 17 | FW | ESP | Valery Fernández |
| 18 | MF | ARG | Cristian Ferreira |
| 21 | DF | POR | Tomás Domingos |
| 22 | MF | ESP | Nils Mortimer |
| 29 | MF | CRO | Andro Babić |

| No. | Pos. | Nation | Player |
|---|---|---|---|
| 31 | FW | BRA | João Guilherme |
| 33 | FW | BRA | André Clóvis |
| 41 | DF | FRA | Anthony Correia |
| 44 | DF | POR | Rúben Pereira |
| 45 | MF | ESP | Alejandro Mestanza |
| 47 | FW | CIV | Lorougnon Gohi |
| 55 | MF | POR | Tomás Silva |
| 57 | DF | POR | Gustavo Costa |
| 58 | GK | BRA | Matheus Sampaio |
| 66 | DF | BRA | Igor Milioransa |
| 75 | DF | POR | Robinho |
| 77 | FW | POR | Paulinho (on loan from Wieczysta Kraków) |
| 80 | GK | BRA | Raphael Nunes |
| 82 | DF | CAF | Hugo Gambor |
| 98 | GK | BRA | Ewerton |

=== Out on loan ===
Note: Flags indicate national team as defined under FIFA eligibility rules; some limited exceptions apply. Players may hold more than one non-FIFA nationality.

| No. | Pos. | Nation | Player |
|---|---|---|---|
| — | DF | BRA | Kauã Vinicius (at Varzim until 30 June 2027) |
| — | MF | GUI | Samba Koné (at Sheriff Tiraspol until 30 June 2027) |

| No. | Pos. | Nation | Player |
|---|---|---|---|
| — | FW | POR | Simão Silva (at Amarante until 30 June 2027) |

== Managerial history ==
- (Portugal) Luís Almeida (11 Jan 2009 – 25 Oct 2009)
- (Portugal) António Borges (1 Nov 2009 – 2 May 2010)
- (Portugal) João Paulo Correia (12 Sept 2010 – 24 Oct 2010)
- (Portugal) Paulo Gomes (31 Oct 2010 – 20 Feb 2011)
- (Portugal) Manuel Matias (27 Feb 2011 – 29 May 2011)
- (Portugal) António Lima Pereira (2011–2012)
- (Portugal) Carlos Agostinho (June 2012 – 11 Nov 2012)
- (Portugal) Filipe Moreira (25 Nov 2012 – 28 Dec 2013)
- (Portugal) Ricardo Chéu (2 Jan 2014 – 10 May 2014)
- (Portugal) Alex Costa (20 May 2014 – 12 Nov 2014)
- (Portugal) Ricardo Chéu (13 Nov 2014 – 7 Feb 2016)
- (Portugal) Bruno Ribeiro (15 Feb 2016 – 9 March 2016)
- (Portugal) Jorge Casquilha (20 March 2016 – 14 May 2016)
- (Portugal) André David (31 May 2016 – 29 November 2016)
- (Portugal) Francisco Chaló (29 November 2016 – February 2018)
- (Portugal) Manuel Cajuda (February 2018 – January 2019)
- (Netherlands) Floris Schaap (January 2019 – February 2019)
- (Portugal) Rui Borges (February 2019 – June 2020)
- (Portugal) Sérgio Bóris (July 2020 – October 2020)
- (Portugal) Pedro Duarte (October 2020 – February 2021)
- (Portugal) Paulo Cadete (interim) (February 2021 – March 2021)
- (Portugal) Zé Gomes (March 2021 – December 2021)
- (Portugal) Pedro Ribeiro (January 2022 – August 2022)
- (Portugal) Gil Oliveira (interim) (August 2022 – September 2022)
- (Portugal) Jorge Costa (September 2022 – April 2023)
- (Portugal) Pedro Bessa (interim) (April 2023 – June 2023)
- (Portugal) Vítor Martins (July 2023 – October 2023)
- (Portugal) Jorge Simão (October 2023 – April 2024)
- (Portugal) Gil Oliveira (interim) (April 2024 – May 2024)
- (Portugal) Rui Ferreira (May 2024 – Present)

== Honours ==
- Portuguese Fourth Division: 2011–12

== League and cup history ==
| Season | Tier | Pos. | Pl. | W | D | L | GS | GA | P | Cup | League Cup | Notes |
|---|---|---|---|---|---|---|---|---|---|---|---|---|
| 2005–06 | 5 | 2 | 30 | 17 | 7 | 6 | 45 | 23 | 58 | | | |
| 2006–07 | 5 | 1 | 30 | 19 | 9 | 2 | 69 | 23 | 66 | | | Promoted |
| 2007–08 | 4 | 2 | 26 | 13 | 8 | 5 | 44 | 24 | 47 | Round 2 | | |
| 2008–09 | 4 | 3 | 26 | 13 | 4 | 9 | 42 | 28 | 43 | Round 1 | | Promoted |
| 2009–10 | 3 | 12 | 30 | 9 | 9 | 12 | 34 | 37 | 36 | Round 1 | | Relegated |
| 2010–11 | 4 | 5 | 22 | 10 | 5 | 7 | 39 | 27 | 35 | Round 2 | | |
| 2011–12 | 4 | 3 | 22 | 10 | 8 | 4 | 31 | 21 | 38 | Round 2 | | |
| 2012–13 | 3 | 1 | 30 | 16 | 10 | 4 | 47 | 21 | 58 | Round 2 | | Promoted |
| 2013–14 | 2 Segunda Liga | 11 | 42 | 16 | 6 | 20 | 43 | 43 | 54 | Round 4 | Round 1 | |
| 2014–15 | 2 Segunda Liga | 12 | 46 | 17 | 11 | 18 | 55 | 56 | 62 | Round 2 | Round 1 | |
| 2015–16 | 2 Segunda Liga | 17 | 46 | 13 | 17 | 16 | 46 | 60 | 56 | Round 3 | Round 1 | |
| 2016–17 | 2 Segunda Liga | 17 | 42 | 13 | 13 | 16 | 49 | 54 | 52 | Round 3 | Round 1 | |
| 2017–18 | 2 Segunda Liga | 3 | 38 | 17 | 13 | 8 | 50 | 40 | 64 | Round 3 | Round 1 | |
| 2018–19 | 2 Segunda Liga | 11 | 34 | 12 | 7 | 15 | 49 | 54 | 43 | Round 3 | Round 1 | |
| 2019–20 | 2 Segunda Liga | 8 | 24 | 9 | 7 | 8 | 21 | 24 | 34 | Semi-final | Round 1 | |
| 2020-21 | 2 Segunda Liga | 14 | 34 | 9 | 9 | 16 | 32 | 45 | 36 | Round of 16 | | |
| 2021-22 | 2 Segunda Liga | 15 | 34 | 10 | 7 | 17 | 30 | 48 | 37 | Round 3 | Round 1 | |
| 2022-23 | 2 Segunda Liga | 4 | 34 | 14 | 11 | 9 | 51 | 45 | 53 | Quarter-final | Semi-final | |
| 2023-24 | 2 Segunda Liga | 11 | 34 | 9 | 16 | 9 | 36 | 38 | 43 | Round 3 | Round 1 | |
