= Heliardo =

Brazilian footballer (born 1991)

Personal information
- Full name: Heliardo Vieira da Silva
- Date of birth: 14 December 1991 (age 34)
- Place of birth: Iporá, Brazil
- Height: 1.90 m (6 ft 3 in)
- Position: Forward

Team information
- Current team: Volta Redonda

Youth career
- Internacional

Senior career*
Years	Team	Apps	(Gls)
2012	Pelotas	0	(0)
2013–2014	Cianorte	21	(2)
2013	→ Oeste (loan)	6	(0)
2014	Esportivo	0	(0)
2015–2016	São José (RS)	26	(9)
2016–2020	Cianorte	0	(0)
2016	→ Joinville (loan)	13	(1)
2017–2018	→ Tondela (loan)	40	(4)
2018–2020	→ Arouca (loan)	1	(0)
2020–2021	Arouca	26	(5)
2021–2022	→ Varzim (loan)	28	(8)
2022–2023	Gyeongnam FC	10	(0)
2023	Penafiel	0	(0)
2023–2024	Vitória Setúbal	23	(9)
2024–	Volta Redonda	7	(1)
2025–2026	→ América-RN (loan)	23	(9)
- * Club domestic league appearances and goals as of 11 November 2026

Heliardo Vieira da Silva (born 14 December 1991), known simply as Heliardo, is a Brazilian professional footballer who plays as a forward for Volta Redonda.
