= Celsinho (footballer, born 1996) =

Portuguese footballer

Personal information
- Full name: Celso Casimiro Domingos
- Date of birth: 12 July 1996 (age 30)
- Place of birth: Faro, Portugal
- Height: 1.77 m (5 ft 10 in)
- Position: Left-back

Team information
- Current team: Valadares Gaia

Youth career
- 2005–2015: Farense

Senior career*
Years	Team	Apps	(Gls)
2015–2018	Farense	9	(1)
2018-2019	Belenenses SAD	0	(0)
2019	Sertanense	18	(1)
2019–2020	Benfica e Castelo Branco	20	(1)
2020–	Valadares Gaia	20	(1)
- * Club domestic league appearances and goals as of 14 March 2021

Celso Casimiro Domingos (born 12 July 1996) known as Celsinho, is a Portuguese professional footballer who plays as a full-back for Valadares Gaia.

== Career ==
Celsinho was born in Faro. On 16 September 2015, he made his professional debut with Farense in a 2015–16 Segunda Liga match against Braga B.
