= António Barbosa (football manager) =

Personal information
- Full name: António Augusto Ramalho Barbosa
- Date of birth: 16 August 1982 (age 44)
- Place of birth: Braga, Portugal

Team information
- Current team: Académica de Coimbra (manager)

Youth career
- Years: Team
- 1998–1999: Vilaverdense
- 1999–2001: Amares

Managerial career
- 2016–2018: Vilaverdense
- 2019–2020: Trofense
- 2021: Varzim
- 2022–2023: Sanjoanense
- 2023: Vilaverdense
- 2024–: Académica de Coimbra

António Augusto Ramalho Barbosa (born 16 August 1982) is a Portuguese football manager. He is the manager of Liga Portugal 2 club Académica de Coimbra.

He began coaching in his early 20s, and led Varzim, Vilaverdense and Académica in the second tier.

== Career ==
Born in Braga, Barbosa did not play football further than youth teams, and began coaching such teams in his early 20s. From 2006 to 2013 he worked at C.D. Trofense, including as coordinator in his final season. In 2019, he was appointed at F.C. Famalicão as under-23 manager, but won none of his seven games and left the team last in the Liga Revelaçao; on 22 October that year he returned to Trofense as first-team manager. At the end of December 2020, it was reported locally that he would leave the club, who were in first place in the then third-tier Campeonato de Portugal.

On 11 January 2021, Barbosa was hired at Varzim S.C. in Liga Portugal 2. His debut six days later was a 1–0 loss to Casa Pia AC. On 5 December, he was dismissed with the club second from bottom.

Barbosa was hired at A.D. Sanjoanense in Liga 3 on 29 December 2022. The following July, he returned to Vilaverdense FC, newly promoted to the second tier. He was dismissed on 10 October, having earned one point from seven games.

Barbosa was appointed at Académica de Coimbra on 2 October 2024, until the end of the Liga 3 season. In May 2026, the club achieved promotion back to the second tier for the first time since 2022, by finishing as runners-up to Amarante FC. His contract was then renewed for another season. He was Liga Portugal 2's Manager of the Month for August 2026, with 39.86% of the vote, having won the first three fixtures before a defeat in the fourth.
