= Gustavo Costa (Portuguese footballer) =

Portuguese footballer (born 2005)

Personal information
- Full name: Gustavo Abreu Costa
- Date of birth: 15 September 2005 (age 21)
- Place of birth: Porto, Portugal
- Height: 1.80 m (5 ft 11 in)
- Position: Left back

Team information
- Current team: Académico de Viseu
- Number: 57

Youth career
- 2012–2016: Porto
- 2016–2018: Dragon Force
- 2018–2020: Rio Ave
- 2020–2022: Vitória de Guimarães
- 2022–2023: Rio Ave
- 2023–2025: Académico de Viseu

Senior career*
| Years | Team | Apps | (Gls) |
| 2022 | Rio Ave B | 1 | (0) |
| 2025– | Académico de Viseu | 34 | (1) |

International career^{‡}
| 2026– | Portugal U20 | 6 | (0) |
- * Club domestic league appearances and goals as of 13:57, 14 November 2026 (UTC) ‡ National team caps and goals as of 13:57, 14 November 2026 (UTC)

Gustavo Abreu Costa (born 15 September 2005) is a Portuguese professional footballer who plays as a left back for Primeira Liga club Académico de Viseu and the Portugal national under-20 team.

== Club career ==
Born in Porto, Costa was a youth player at FC Porto, Vitória de Guimarães and Rio Ave before joining Académico de Viseu in 2023. In his first season there, he helped the under-19 team to 6th place in the national championship, before moving on to the under-23 team in his second season.

On 31 August 2025, Costa made his professional debut in Liga Portugal 2 in a 2–0 home win over Porto B. In his next game 15 days later, he assisted both goals by Álvaro Zamora in a 2–2 draw at Oliveirense. On 23 December, after 11 games, he extended his contract to 2029. He scored his first professional goal on 14 March 2026, in a 3–1 home win over Leixões; he finished the season with 29 appearances as his team won promotion to the Primeira Liga for the first time in 37 years, as runners-up to Marítimo.

== International career ==
In March 2026, Costa was called up for the Portugal national under-20 team for matches against Switzerland and the Czech Republic. He made his debut on 27 March in a 2–0 win over the Swiss at the Estádio Municipal de Aveiro, playing the last 11 minutes as a substitute.
