= Pedro Ribeiro (football manager) =

Portuguese association football manager

Personal information
- Full name: Pedro Ricardo Torres Ribeiro
- Date of birth: 26 November 1985 (age 40)
- Place of birth: Guimarães, Portugal

Team information
- Current team: Oliveirense (manager)

Managerial career
- Years: Team
- 2009–2010: Tirsense (assistant)
- 2010–2011: Feirense (assistant)
- 2011–2013: Porto (assistant)
- 2013–2014: Al-Ahli (assistant)
- 2015: Olympiacos (assistant)
- 2015–2016: Fenerbahçe (assistant)
- 2016–2017: 1860 Munich (assistant)
- 2018: Gil Vicente
- 2019–2020: Belenenses SAD
- 2020–2021: Penafiel
- 2022: Académico Viseu
- 2023–2024: Leixões
- 2024–2025: Sunderland (assistant)
- 2026–: Oliveirense

Pedro Ricardo Torres Ribeiro (born 26 November 1985) is a Portuguese football manager who is in charge of Liga 3 club Oliveirense.

He began coaching at age 19, and worked as an assistant at Porto and other clubs under Vítor Pereira. He managed Belenenses SAD briefly in the Primeira Liga, and four clubs in the second tier.

== Career ==
=== Early career and assistant ===
Born in Guimarães, Braga District, Ribeiro had a modest career as a football player, and started his coaching career when he was 19 years old. Before starting his senior professional coaching career, he coached F.C. Tirsense and F.C. Vizela youth teams. He became assistant coach at C.D. Feirense in the second division under Quim Machado and helped the team gain promotion to the Primeira Liga.

Ribeiro then worked in the FC Porto scouting department, working directly with the first team as an opponent team analyst and scout. He was at Porto under André Villas-Boas, Jesualdo Ferreira and Vítor Pereira. Pereira invited him to work on his technical staff, as assistant coach. He held this position for him until 2017, at Porto, Al-Ahli Saudi FC, Olympiacos FC, Fenerbahçe S.K. and TSV 1860 Munich.

=== Gil Vicente and Belenenses SAD ===
On 23 February 2018, Ribeiro was appointed in his first position as head coach, at Gil Vicente F.C. who were 18th in the second division; he became the youngest coach in Portuguese professional football.

In July 2019, Ribeiro was appointed as manager of the under-23 team at Belenenses SAD. On 4 September, he took interim charge of the first team in the top flight following the dismissal of Silas, and nine days later was given the job on a permanent basis. He left the club from Belém by mutual accord the following 12 January, after three consecutive defeats left them a point above the relegation places.

=== Penafiel, Académico and Leixões ===
Ribeiro returned to the second tier on 23 June 2020, succeeding Miguel Leal at F.C. Penafiel. At the end of the following year, he left the eighth-placed team by mutual consent, following three consecutive losses.

On the first day of 2022, Ribeiro filled the vacancy at Académico de Viseu F.C. caused by the exit of Zé Gomes. He left by mutual consent on 14 August, after starting the new season with an away draw and home defeat.

Ribeiro was appointed as head coach of Liga Portugal 2 side Leixões S.C. on 13 June 2023. On 24 January 2024, with the club sitting 16th in the league table, he was sacked.

=== Sunderland assistant ===
On 8 October 2024, Ribeiro was appointed assistant head coach of EFL Championship side Sunderland. Head coach Régis Le Bris assigned him to work on the team's defence. He left by mutual consent on 1 August 2025, after the team's promotion to the Premier League and amidst a re-structuring of the coaching team.
