= Filipe Martins =

Portuguese football coach and former player

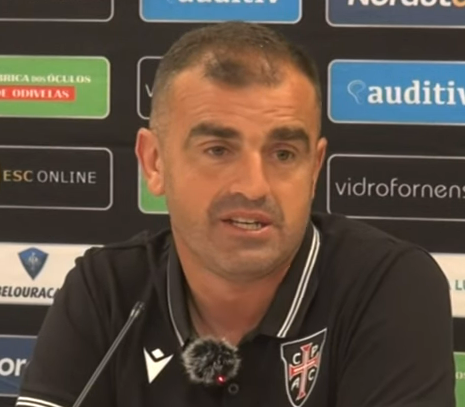
- Martins in 2023

Personal information
- Full name: Filipe Gonçalo Pinto Martins
- Date of birth: 29 May 1978 (age 48)
- Place of birth: Amadora, Portugal
- Height: 1.81 m (5 ft 11 in)
- Position: Left-back

Youth career
- 1991–1996: Estrela Amadora

Senior career*
Years	Team	Apps	(Gls)
1996–1999	Estrela Amadora	3	(0)
1999	Estoril	4	(0)
1999–2000	Oriental	27	(0)
2000–2001	Câmara Lobos	23	(2)
2001–2006	Atlético CP		
2006–2008	Odivelas	65	(3)
2008–2009	Atlético CP	27	(0)
2009–2010	Estrela Amadora	23	(0)
2010–2011	Pêro Pinheiro		

Managerial career
- 2011–2014: Belas (youth)
- 2014–2016: Real Massamá (youth)
- 2016–2018: Real Massamá
- 2018–2019: Mafra
- 2019: Feirense
- 2020–2023: Casa Pia
- 2024: Estrela Amadora
- 2025: Wuhan Three Towns
- 2025–2026: Chaves
- * Club domestic league appearances and goals

Filipe Gonçalo Pinto Martins (born 29 May 1978) is a Portuguese football manager and former player who played as a left-back. He was most recently manager of Liga Portugal 2 club Chaves.

== Playing career ==
Born in Amadora, Martins began his senior career with hometown side C.F. Estrela da Amadora, appearing in three Primeira Liga matches with the first team. He left the club in January 1999 to join Segunda Divisão de Honra side G.D. Estoril Praia, where he also featured rarely as the club suffered relegation.

Martins went on to resume his career in the lower levels, representing Clube Oriental de Lisboa, C.S.D. Câmara de Lobos, Atlético Clube de Portugal (two stints) and Odivelas before returning to his first club Estrela in 2009. He retired in 2011 with C.A. Pêro Pinheiro, aged 33.

== Coaching career ==
After retiring, Martins worked as a youth coach for C.D. Belas and Real S.C. before being named first team manager of the latter in 2016. He led the side to a promotion to the second division in his first season, but resigned on 16 January 2018.

On 14 June 2018, Martins replaced Luís Freire at the helm of C.D. Mafra, also in division two. The following 4 February, he left the club to take over C.D. Feirense in the Primeira Liga, but was unable to avoid relegation.

Martins left Feirense on a mutual agreement on 11 November 2019, after three consecutive league defeats. The following 1 September, he was named manager of Casa Pia A.C., leading the side to a ninth position in the 2020–21 campaign.

In the 2021–22 season, Martins led Casa Pia to the a first top-flight promotion in 83 years as runners-up to Rio Ave F.C. in the second division, but was absent for one match in February 2022 due to consequences of the COVID-19 epidemic.

On 12 November 2023, after six matches without a win, with Casa Pia sitting 15th in the Primeira Liga table, the club announced that Martins had resigned as head coach. On 6 June 2024, he returned to Estrela da Amadora after being named manager of the side, but was sacked on 24 September after six winless matches.

On 17 January 2025, Martins joined Chinese Super League club Wuhan Three Towns. Martins left the club on 11 April 2025 having earned just 1 point from the opening 5 league games.

On 29 June 2025, Martins was appointed as the new head coach of Chaves.

== Managerial statistics ==
As of 6 February 2026

Managerial record by team and tenure
Team	Nat	From	To	Record							
Team	Nat	From	To	G	W	D	L	GF	GA	GD	Win %
Real Massamá	(Portugal)	1 July 2016	16 January 2018	60	27	12	21	78	65	+13	45.00
Mafra	(Portugal)	14 June 2018	4 February 2019	23	10	5	8	31	28	+3	43.48
Feirense	(Portugal)	4 February 2019	11 November 2019	26	5	7	14	31	48	−17	19.23
Casa Pia	(Portugal)	1 September 2020	12 November 2023	133	57	32	44	168	143	+25	42.86
Estrela Amadora	(Portugal)	6 June 2024	24 September 2024	6	0	2	4	3	9	−6	0.00
Wuhan Three Towns	(China)	17 January 2025	11 April 2025	5	0	1	4	2	11	−9	0.00
Chaves	(Portugal)	29 June 2025	8 February 2026	23	8	6	9	26	22	+4	34.78
Total				276	107	65	104	339	324	+15	38.77

== Honours ==
=== Manager ===
Real Massamá

- Campeonato de Portugal: 2016–17

Individual

- Liga Portugal 2 Manager of the Season: 2021–22
- Liga Portugal 2 Manager of the Month: February 2022
- Primeira Liga Manager of the Month: September 2022
