= José Gomes (footballer, born 1976) =

Portuguese footballer

Zé Gomes
Personal information
- Full name: José Manuel Gomes da Silva
- Date of birth: 24 September 1976 (age 50)
- Place of birth: Vila do Conde, Portugal
- Height: 1.76 m (5 ft 9 in)
- Position: Right-back

Team information
- Current team: Madura United (head coach)

Youth career
- 1990–1995: Rio Ave

Senior career*
| Years | Team | Apps | (Gls) |
| 1995 | Ribeirão | | |
| 1996 | Vila Nova Foz Côa | | |
| 1996–1998 | Bragança | | |
| 1998–1999 | Montalegre | | |
| 1999 | Braga B | 9 | (0) |
| 2000–2001 | Bragança | 28 | (5) |
| 2001–2003 | Ovarense | 50 | (2) |
| 2003–2006 | Rio Ave | 87 | (3) |
| 2006–2009 | Marítimo | 18 | (1) |
| 2007–2008 | → Konyaspor (loan) | 10 | (0) |
| 2009 | Marítimo B | 12 | (0) |
| 2009–2012 | Rio Ave | 60 | (1) |
| 2012–2013 | Bragança | 25 | (1) |

Managerial career
- 2016–2017: Bragança
- 2018–2019: Rio Ave B
- 2020–2021: Rio Ave (under-23)
- 2021: Académico Viseu
- 2022: Académica
- 2025: Arema
- 2026–: Madura United
- * Club domestic league appearances and goals

José Manuel Gomes da Silva (born 24 September 1976), commonly known as Zé Gomes, is a Portuguese former professional footballer who played as a right-back. He is currently the head coach of the Indonesia Super League club, Madura United.

== Personal life ==
Gomes' younger brother Vítor was also a professional footballer, and they played together at Rio Ave.

== Playing career ==
Born in Vila do Conde, Gomes appeared in 165 Primeira Liga matches over seven seasons, scoring a total of five goals for hometown club Rio Ave F.C. (six years) and C.S. Marítimo (one). In 2007–08, he was loaned by the latter to Konyaspor of the Turkish Süper Lig.

Gomes retired at GD Bragança in 2013 at the age of 36, and had his first managerial job at the third-division team in June 2016.

== Managerial career ==
On 25 April 2017, Gomes reached a mutual agreement to leave Bragança after three successive defeats dented their promotion hopes. After working at Rio Ave's reserve and under-23 teams, he was hired at Académico de Viseu F.C. of the Liga Portugal 2 on 28 February 2021, taking over a side in 16th. He lost 2–1 at S.C. Covilhã on his professional debut.

Having kept the team up in 14th place, Gomes renewed his contract for one more year in June 2021. The 2021–22 campaign started with the Beira side in fifth after ten games, but a run of one point from a possible 18 cost him his job before the turn of the year.

Gomes was appointed at Académica de Coimbra on 4 March 2022, becoming the club's fourth manager of the season. He was not able to prevent second-tier relegation as last.

On 4 January 2025, Gomes became the new head coach of Arema F.C. in the Liga 1 (Indonesia). He left by mutual consent on 24 June.

== Managerial statistics ==
As of match played 20 November 2026

Managerial record by team and tenure
| Team | Nat. | From | To | Record | | | | | Ref. |
| Team | Nat. | From | To | G | W | D | L | Win % | Ref. |
|---|---|---|---|---|---|---|---|---|---|
| Académico Viseu | (Portugal) | 1 March 2021 | 30 December 2021 | 32 | 11 | 4 | 17 | 34.38 | |
| Académica | (Portugal) | 3 March 2022 | 30 June 2022 | 10 | 0 | 3 | 7 | 0.00 | |
| Arema | (Indonesia) | 4 January 2025 | 24 June 2025 | 17 | 5 | 4 | 8 | 29.41 | |
| Madura United | (Indonesia) | 9 June 2026 | Present | 10 | 6 | 1 | 3 | 60.00 | |
| Career Total | | | | 69 | 22 | 12 | 35 | 31.88 | |
