= Carlos Pinto (Portuguese footballer) =

Portuguese football coach and former player

Personal information
- Full name: José Carlos Alves Ferreira Pinto
- Date of birth: 2 March 1973 (age 53)
- Place of birth: Paços de Ferreira, Portugal
- Height: 1.78 m (5 ft 10 in)
- Position: Midfielder

Youth career
- 1983–1991: Paços Ferreira

Senior career*
Years	Team	Apps	(Gls)
1991–1995	Paços Ferreira	2	(0)
1991–1992	→ Rebordosa (loan)		
1994–1995	→ Lousada (loan)	31	(3)
1995–1998	Paredes		
1998–1999	Salgueiros	4	(0)
1999–2000	Naval	9	(0)
2000–2001	Paredes	11	(0)
2001–2003	Vila Real	49	(19)
2003	Paredes	20	(1)
2003–2007	Feirense	118	(30)
2007–2010	Chaves	90	(28)
2010–2011	Vizela	15	(2)
2011–2012	Tirsense	29	(4)
Total		378	(87)

Managerial career
- 2012–2013: Tirsense
- 2013–2014: Freamunde
- 2014: Tondela
- 2014–2015: Chaves
- 2015–2016: Freamunde
- 2016: Santa Clara
- 2016: Paços Ferreira
- 2016–2018: Santa Clara
- 2018: Académica
- 2019: Famalicão
- 2019–2020: Leixões
- 2020–2021: Chaves
- 2021: Vilafranquense
- 2022: Al-Jabalain
- 2024: Al Safa
- * Club domestic league appearances and goals

José Carlos Alves Ferreira Pinto (born 2 March 1973) is a Portuguese former footballer who played as a midfielder, currently a manager.

== Playing career ==
Born in Paços de Ferreira, Pinto began his senior career at Rebordosa A.C. of the third division in 1991. A year later, he returned to his parent club F.C. Paços de Ferreira, making one substitute appearance in each of his two Primeira Liga seasons.

Besides four matches – one start – for S.C. Salgueiros in the top tier in the 1998–99 campaign, Pinto spent most of his career in the lower leagues, representing Associação Naval 1º de Maio, C.D. Feirense and G.D. Chaves in the Segunda Liga over six seasons (21 as a senior overall).

== Coaching career ==
Pinto's first managerial job was at F.C. Tirsense in the third level in 2012. He then worked with several teams in the second tier.

On 1 July 2016, Pinto was appointed at his hometown club Paços de Ferreira. He resigned on 28 November with the team in 15th, two points above the relegation zone, and eliminated from the Taça de Portugal by lowly U.D. Vilafranquense.

Pinto returned to his former employer C.D. Santa Clara on 8 December 2016, as their fourth manager of the season. He left the Azorean side on 14 May 2018 at the end of his contract, having won promotion to the top flight in second place.

Pinto remained in the second division, at Académica de Coimbra, whom he left on 1 October 2018 by mutual consent after being ousted from the Portuguese Cup by amateurs Juventude de Pedras Salgadas. The following 18 March he was appointed at F.C. Famalicão of the same league, and he won seven of their last eight games to earn promotion.

On 24 May 2019, it was confirmed that Pinto would take charge of second-tier Leixões S.C. for the upcoming campaign. He resigned the following 18 January, after a run of eight matches without a win left the team in ninth place.

Pinto returned to Chaves in May 2020. He left by mutual consent the following 8 February, with the side placed fifth in the second division.

On 10 July 2022, Pinto was appointed at Saudi First Division League club Al-Jabalain FC. He was dismissed on 20 October due to poor results.

On 30 June 2024, Pinto became head coach of Al Safa FC in the same country and league. Three months later, he was sacked.

== Managerial statistics ==
As of match played 18 October 2024

Managerial record by club and tenure
Team	From	To	Record				
Team	From	To	M	W	D	L	Win %
Tirsense	21 February 2012	30 June 2013	43	17	15	11	39.53
Freamunde	1 July 2013	30 June 2014	36	24	8	4	66.67
Tondela	1 July 2014	6 October 2014	16	6	7	3	37.50
Chaves	23 December 2014	30 June 2015	26	12	11	3	46.15
Freamunde	17 August 2015	18 February 2016	29	13	8	8	44.83
Santa Clara	24 February 2016	24 May 2016	18	9	5	4	50.00
Paços Ferreira	25 May 2016	28 November 2016	14	4	4	6	28.57
Santa Clara	7 December 2016	14 May 2018	70	32	18	20	45.71
Académica	30 May 2018	1 October 2018	7	1	4	2	14.29
Famalicão	18 March 2019	21 May 2019	8	7	0	1	87.50
Leixões	24 May 2019	18 January 2020	22	8	7	7	36.36
Chaves	18 May 2020	8 February 2021	20	9	3	8	45.00
Vilafranquense	10 March 2021	23 August 2021	16	2	4	10	12.50
Al-Jabalain	10 July 2022	20 October 2022	8	3	2	3	37.50
Al Safa	30 June 2024	18 October 2024	7	1	1	5	14.29
Total			340	148	97	95	43.53

== Honours ==
=== Manager ===
Freamunde

- Campeonato de Portugal: 2013–14
