= C.D. Cova da Piedade =

Portuguese football club

Cova da Piedade
- Full name: Clube Desportivo da Cova da Piedade
- Nickname: Rapazes de Azul-Grená
- Founded: 1947; 79 years ago
- Ground: Estádio Municipal José Martins Vieira, Cova da Piedade
- Capacity: 3,000
- Chairman: Paulo Veiga
- Manager: João Sousa
- League: Distrital Championship
- 2020–21: Liga Portugal 2, 11th of 18 (forcibly relegated)
- Website: www.cdcovapiedade.pt
| Home colours | Away colours |

Clube Desportivo Cova da Piedade is a football club established in the parish of Cova da Piedade, municipality of Almada, Portugal. The club merged with B-SAD, in an attempt of the former to retain their position currently in Liga 3, the third tier of Portuguese football, but they weren't granted license and were relegated to distrital championships.

== History ==
Clube Desportivo Cova da Piedade was founded on 28 January 1947, resulting from the merge between União Piedense Futebol Clube, founded on 9 April 1914, and Sporting Clube Piedense. Cova da Piedade's current president is Paulo Veiga.

=== Promotion to LigaPro ===
On 30 April 2016, Cova da Piedade were promoted for the first time ever to the professional second-tier (all previous presences in the second-tier were prior to the creation of Segunda Divisão de Honra in 1990) after beating Angrense 2–1, confirming the first place on Campeonato de Portugal, South Zone, with two more matches still to play. They won the third-tier championship title on 5 June 2016, against North Zone winners Vizela.

=== Relegation to Liga 3 ===
Cova da Piedade failed to produce valid licensing documentation to compete in the 2021–22 season of the Liga Portugal 2, so they were punished by the Portuguese Professional Football League with direct relegation to the Liga 3.

=== Merger with B-SAD ===
On 7 March 2023, the boards of Cova da Piedade and B-SAD (an offshoot of C.F. Os Belenenses) announced a merger, taking the league position of B-SAD while retaining the name and facilities and Cova da Piedade. Cova da Piedade had not played senior football since being expelled from Liga Portugal 2 in 2021, while B-SAD had been renting the Estádio Nacional from the state while using distant facilities for training. In June, B-SAD was relegated from the second tier after a 2–1 playoff defeat to Länk FC Vilaverdense, meaning that the fused club would begin life in Liga 3.

== Stadium ==
Cova da Piedade play their matches at Estádio Municipal José Martins Vieira (named after the former President of the Municipality of Almada) and has a capacity for 3,000 spectators. The stadium has natural turf.

== Current squad ==
As of 26 January 2022

Note: Flags indicate national team as defined under FIFA eligibility rules; some limited exceptions apply. Players may hold more than one non-FIFA nationality.

| No. | Pos. | Nation | Player |
|---|---|---|---|
| 1 | GK | POR | Sandro Cabral |
| 2 | DF | POR | Luís Marcelino |
| 3 | DF | POR | João Gomes |
| 4 | DF | POR | Fábio Santos |
| 7 | MF | POR | Iko Caetano |
| 8 | MF | CPV | Fábio Arcanjo |
| 9 | FW | POR | Vicente Caldeira |
| 11 | MF | POR | Rui Batalha |
| 13 | GK | POR | Tomás Carvalho |
| 14 | DF | POR | Pedro Carvalho |
| 15 | FW | URU | Juan San Martín |
| 16 | MF | BRA | Caio Carioca |

| No. | Pos. | Nation | Player |
|---|---|---|---|
| 17 | FW | ZAM | Kenneth Kalunga |
| 20 | MF | POR | Tiago Baptista |
| 21 | DF | GNB | Assane Baldé |
| 22 | FW | POR | Hélio Vaz |
| 23 | DF | GNB | Califo Baldé |
| 29 | FW | POR | Valter Zacarias |
| 30 | FW | POR | Diogo David |
| 33 | DF | BRA | Sandro |
| 41 | DF | CHN | Victor Wang |
| 44 | DF | CPV | Yaka Medina |
| 47 | DF | POR | Celsinho |
| 88 | MF | POR | Pedro Pinto |

== Honours ==
- Campeonato de Portugal: 1
  - 2015–16
- Terceira Divisão: 2
  - 1947–48, 1970–71

== League and cup history ==
| Season | Tier | Competition | Pos. | Pl. | W | D | L | GS | GA | P | Portuguese Cup | Portuguese League Cup | Notes |
|---|---|---|---|---|---|---|---|---|---|---|---|---|---|
| 2014–15 | 3 | Campeonato de Portugal (league) | 3 | 18 | 8 | 4 | 6 | 17 | 15 | 28 | Round 3 | Not eligible | |
| 2015–16 | 3 | Campeonato de Portugal (league) | 1 | 18 | 10 | 5 | 3 | 23 | 13 | 35 | Round 4 | Not eligible | Promoted |
| 2016–17 | 2 | Portuguese Second Division | 16 | 42 | 14 | 11 | 17 | 45 | 60 | 53 | Round 4 | 2nd qualifying round | |
| 2017–18 | 2 | Portuguese Second Division | 9 | 38 | 14 | 9 | 15 | 42 | 45 | 51 | Quarter-finals | 2nd qualifying round | |
Fusion from B-SAD
| 2023–24 | 5 | Distrital Championship | | | | | | | | | | | |
