= Estádio Municipal José dos Santos Pinto =

Association football stadium in Covilhã, Portugal

- Interactive map of Estádio Municipal José dos Santos Pinto
- Former names: Campo do Alto do Hospital
- Location: Covilhã
- Coordinates: 40.283023°N 7.511542°W
- Owner: Municipality of Covilhã
- Operator: Sporting da Covilhã
- Capacity: 3,500
- Surface: Grass
- Field size: 106 × 64 m

Construction
- Groundbreaking: 1932
- Opened: 1935
- Renovated: 1985

Tenant
- Sporting da Covilhã (1935–03, 2014–present)

The Estádio Municipal José dos Santos Pinto is an association football stadium located in Covilhã, Portugal, which is used by S.C. Covilhã as their home ground.

== Notable matches ==
On 21 March 2020, the stadium hosted the first ever Taça da Liga Feminina final between Benfica and Sporting CP.
