= Estádio Municipal Jorge Sampaio =

Football stadium in Pedroso, Portugal

- Interactive map of Estádio Municipal Jorge Sampaio
- Location: Pedroso, Portugal
- Coordinates: 41.067158°N 8.544812°W
- Owner: Municipality of Vila Nova de Gaia
- Operator: Municipality of Vila Nova de Gaia
- Capacity: 8,500
- Surface: Grass

Construction
- Opened: 2003

Tenant
- FC Porto B

The Estádio Municipal Jorge Sampaio is an association football stadium located in Pedroso, Portugal, which is used by FC Porto B as their home ground.
