= 2007–08 Taça da Liga =

Tournament details
- Host country: Portugal
- Dates: 4 August 2007 – 22 March 2008
- Teams: 32

Final positions
- Champions: Vitória de Setúbal (1st title)
- Runners-up: Sporting CP

Tournament statistics
- Matches played: 39
- Goals scored: 76 (1.95 per match)
- Top scorer: Matheus (5)

The 2007–08 Taça da Liga was the first edition of the Taça da Liga, also known as Carlsberg Cup for sponsorship reasons.

For the first round (4 and 5 August), only teams competing in the Liga de Honra participated. In the second round (12 August), Primeira Liga teams entered.

The competition was won by Vitória de Setúbal, who defeated Sporting CP 3–2 in the penalty shootout after a goalless draw at the Estádio Algarve, Faro.

== First round ==
=== Drawing ===
Teams had been distributed by two pots, being based on the position of the previous championship.

- Pot A (away):
  - Beira-Mar and Desportivo das Aves, who were relegated from the top division;
  - 3rd to 8th position of the 2006–07 Liga de Honra.
- Pot B (home):
  - 9th to 14th position of the 2006–07 Liga de Honra;
  - Fátima and Freamunde, who were promoted from II Divisão.

Pot A	Pot B
Beira-Mar	Olhanense
Desportivo das Aves	Estoril
Rio Ave	Trofense
Santa Clara	Gil Vicente
Gondomar	Vizela
Feirense	Portimonense
Varzim	Fátima
Penafiel	Freamunde

=== Games ===
Team 1	Score	Team 2
(LH) Trofense	2–1	Feirense (LH)
(LH) Vizela	1–3	Varzim (LH)
(LH) Freamunde	0–0 (2–4 p)	Beira-Mar (LH)
(LH) Estoril	2–1	Desportivo das Aves (LH)
(LH) Fátima	2–0	Santa Clara (LH)
(LH) Portimonense	1–0	Rio Ave (LH)
(LH) Olhanense	0–1	Gondomar (LH)
(LH) Gil Vicente	2–2 (4–5 p)	Penafiel (LH)

(LH) - Liga de Honra

=== Games results in detail ===
4 August 2007
17:00

Trofense	2–1	Feirense
Marcos Antônio 41'; Borges 53'		Leitão 61'

Estádio do Clube Desportivo Trofense, Trofa
Referee: Luís Reforço, Setúbal

4 August 2007
17:00

Vizela	1–3	Varzim
N. Sousa 7'		Roberto 20'; Chico 57'; Ukra 90'

Estádio do Futebol Clube de Vizela, Vizela
Referee: Rui Silva, Vila Real

5 August 2007
16:00

Estoril	2–1	Desportivo das Aves
Dorival 44'; Dagil 48'		Gouveia 11'

Estádio António Coimbra da Mota, Estoril
Referee: Marco Ferreira, Porto

5 August 2007
16:00

Freamunde	0–0	Beira-Mar
Penalties
Evandro (penalty missed); Bertinho (penalty missed); Marcão (penalty scored); Heslley (penalty scored)	2–4	(penalty scored) Vidigal; (penalty scored) Artur; (penalty scored) Fernando; (penalty scored) Ratinho

Complexo Desportivo do SC Freamunde, Freamunde
Referee: Vasco Santos, Porto

5 August 2007
16:00

Fátima	2–0	Santa Clara
Marinho 56'; Saleiro 60'

Estádio João Paulo II, Fátima
Referee: Bruno Paixão, Setúbal

5 August 2007
17:00

Portimonense	1–0	Rio Ave
Bevacqua 4'

Estádio Municipal, Portimão
Referee: Hugo Miguel, Lisbon

5 August 2007
17:30

Olhanense	0–1	Gondomar
		Nelsinho 58'

Estádio José Arcanjo, Olhão
Referee: João Capela, Coimbra

5 August 2007
19:45

Gil Vicente	2–2	Penafiel
Hermes 32'; Tiago André 90'		João Pedro 47'; Campos 53' (pen.)
Penalties
Vilela (penalty scored); Ribeiro (penalty scored); Diego Gaúcho (penalty missed); Luís Miguel (penalty scored); Hermes (penalty scored)	4–5	(penalty scored) Lourenço; (penalty scored) João Pedro; (penalty scored) Sousa; (penalty scored) Araújo; (penalty scored) Campos

Estádio Cidade de Barcelos, Barcelos
Referee: Olegário Benquerença, Leiria

== Second round ==
=== Drawing ===
Teams were divided for two pots, one with the lower ranked Portuguese Liga teams and the other with the first round winners, who played at home.

- Pot C (home):
  - winners teams of first round;
- Pot D (visitors):
  - 9th to 14th placed teams of the 2006–07 Primeira Liga, and the 1st and 2nd placed teams of the 2006–07 Liga de Honra (Leixões and Vitória de Guimarães);

Pot C	Pot D
Trofense	Estrela da Amadora
Varzim	Boavista
Beira-Mar	Marítimo
Estoril	Naval
Fátima	Académica
Portimonense	Vitória de Setúbal
Gondomar	Leixões
Penafiel	Vitória de Guimarães

(LH) – Liga de Honra (PL) – Primeira League

=== Games ===
Team 1	Score	Team 2
(LH) Estoril	0–1	Estrela da Amadora (PL)
(LH) Penafiel	0–0 (5–4 p)	Marítimo (PL)
(LH) Fátima	1–0	Académica (PL)
(LH) Portimonense	0–0 (4–3 p)	Naval (PL)
(LH) Varzim	0–4	Leixões (PL)
(LH) Gondomar	0–3	Vitória de Setúbal (PL)
(LH) Trofense	0–1	Vitória de Guimarães (PL)
(LH) Beira-Mar	1–0	Boavista (PL)

(LH) – Liga de Honra
(PL) – Primeira League

=== Games results in detail ===
12 August 2007
16:00

Estoril	0–1	Estrela da Amadora
		Cardoso 45'

Estádio António Coimbra da Mota, Estoril
Referee: Cosme Machado, Braga

12 August 2007
16:00

Penafiel	0–0	Marítimo
Penalties
Campos (penalty scored); Lourenço (penalty scored); Guedes (penalty scored); Mourão (penalty scored); Berville (penalty missed); Ferreira (penalty scored)	5–4	(penalty scored) Kanu; (penalty scored) Felício; (penalty scored) Bruno; (penalty scored) Marcinho; (penalty missed) Van der Linden; (penalty missed) Wênio

Estádio Municipal 25 de Abril, Penafiel
Referee: João Vilas Boas, Braga

12 August 2007
17:00

Fátima	1–0	Académica
Ricardo Jorgue 27'

Estádio Municipal de Fátima, Fátima
Referee: Augusto Duarte, Braga

12 August 2007
17:00

Portimonense	0–0	Naval
Penalties
Pessoa (penalty scored); Marronkle (penalty scored); Miguel Ângelo (penalty missed); Tarantini (penalty scored); Emídio Rafael (penalty scored)	4–3	(penalty scored) Marcelinho; (penalty scored) Saulo; (penalty scored) Mário Sérgio; (penalty missed) Gaúcho; (penalty missed) Elivelton

Estádio do Portimonense, Portimão
Referee: Rui Costa, Porto

12 August 2007
17:15

Varzim	0–4	Leixões
		Vieirinha 5', 53' (pen.); China 7'; Roberto 58'

Estádio do Varzim SC, Varzim
Referee: Paulo Baptista, Portalegre

12 August 2007
17:30

Gondomar	0–3	Vitória de Setúbal
		Kim 44'; Matheus 77'; Edinho 80'

Estádio de São Miguel, Gondomar
Referee: Paulo Pereira, Viana do Castelo

12 August 2007
18:00

Trofense	0–1	Vitória de Guimarães
		Mrdaković 30'

Estádio do Clube Desportivo Trofense, Trofa
Referee: Carlos Xistra, Castelo Branco

12 August 2007
19:45

Beira-Mar	1–0	Boavista
Roma 81'

Estádio Municipal de Aveiro, Aveiro
Referee: Elmano Santos, Madeira

== Third round ==
=== Drawing ===
Teams were divided in two pots, one with the higher ranked Portuguese Liga teams and the other with the second round winners, who played at home.

- Pot E (home):
  - winners teams of Second round;
- Pot F (visitors):
  - 1st to 8th placed teams of the 2006–07 Primeira Liga

Pot E	Pot F
Estrela da Amadora	Nacional
Penafiel	União de Leiria
Fátima	Paços de Ferreira
Portimonense	Belenenses
Leixões	Braga
Vitória de Setúbal	Benfica
Vitória de Guimarães	Sporting CP
Beira-Mar	Porto

=== Games ===
Team 1	Score	Team 2
(PL) Leixões	0–2	União de Leiria (PL)
(LH) Penafiel	1–0	Nacional (PL)
(LH) Portimonense	1–1 (4–3 p)	Belenenses (PL)
(LH) Beira-Mar	0–0 (4–3 p)	Paços de Ferreira (PL)
(PL) Vitória de Setúbal	2–0	Braga (PL)
(LH) Fátima	0–0 (4–2 p)	Porto (PL)
(PL) Estrela da Amadora	1–1 (4–5 p)	Benfica (PL)
(PL) Vitória de Guimarães	0–0 (6–7 p)	Sporting CP (PL)

(LH) – Liga de Honra
(PL) – Primeira League

=== Games results in details ===
26 September 2007
16:00

Leixões	0–2	União de Leiria
		Maciel 15'; Jessui 76' (pen.)

Estádio do Mar, Matosinhos
Referee: Cosme Machado, Braga

26 September 2007
17:00

Penafiel	1 – 0	Nacional
Guedes 21'

Estádio Municipal 25 de Abril, Penafiel
Referee: Paulo Costa, Porto

26 September 2007
18:00

Portimonense	1–1	Belenenses
Paulo Sérgio 83'		Fernando 66'
Penalties
Tarantini (penalty scored); Wellington (penalty missed); Gonzalo (penalty scored); Raphael (penalty scored); Paulo Sérgio (penalty scored)	4–3	(penalty scored) Amorim; (penalty scored) Roncatto; (penalty scored) Gómez; (penalty missed) Weldon; (penalty missed) Rolando

Estádio do Restelo, Lisbon
Referee: Hugo Miguel, Lisbon

26 September 2007
19:00

Beira-Mar	0–0	Paços de Ferreira
Penalties
Roma (penalty scored); Matos (penalty missed); Lopes (penalty scored); Emerson (penalty scored); Luís (penalty scored)	4–3	(penalty scored) Luiz Carlos; (penalty scored) Pedrinha; (penalty missed) Furtado; (penalty missed) Édson Di; (penalty scored) Fernando Pilar

Estádio Municipal de Aveiro, Aveiro
Referee: João Vilas Boas, Braga

26 September 2007
19:15

Vitória de Setúbal	2–0	Braga
Matheus 80'; Branco 88'

Estádio do Bonfim, Setúbal
Referee: Elmano Santos, Madeira

26 September 2007
19:15

Fátima	0–0	Porto
Penalties
Miguel Xavier (penalty scored); Saleiro (penalty scored); Moreira (penalty scored); Marinho (penalty scored)	4–2	(penalty scored) João Paulo; (penalty scored) Lima; (penalty missed) Lino; (penalty missed) M. González

Estádio João Paulo II, Fátima
Referee: Carlos Xistra, Castelo Branco

26 September 2007
20:30

Estrela da Amadora	1 – 1	Benfica
Maurício 36'		Adu 90+3' (pen.)
Penalties
Maurício (penalty missed); Mateus (penalty scored); Gomes (penalty scored); Cardoso (penalty scored); Fernando (penalty scored); Yoni (penalty missed)	4–5	(penalty scored) Adu; (penalty scored) Rodríguez; (penalty missed) Butt; (penalty scored) Luisão; (penalty scored) Coentrão; (penalty scored) Díaz

Estádio José Gomes, Amadora
Referee: Duarte Gomes, Lisbon

26 September 2007
20:45

Vitória de Guimarães	0–0	Sporting CP
Penalties
Ghilas (penalty scored); Rabiola (penalty missed); Andrezinho (penalty scored); Desmarets (penalty missed); Fajardo (penalty scored); Targino (penalty scored); Amaral (penalty missed); Geromel (penalty scored); Sereno (penalty scored); Alves (penalty missed)	6–7	(penalty scored) Romagnoli; (penalty scored) Polga; (penalty scored) Moutinho; (penalty missed) Ronny; (penalty missed) Veloso; (penalty scored) Paredes; (penalty missed) Tonel; (penalty scored) Abel; (penalty scored) Djaló; (penalty scored) Tiago

Estádio D. Afonso Henriques, Guimarães
Referee: Bruno Paixão, Setúbal

== Fourth round ==
The winning teams of the third round will be in only one pot and will play in two legs.

Clube	League
Sporting CP	PL
Benfica	PL
União de Leiria	PL
Vitória de Setúbal	PL
Beira-Mar	LH
Penafiel	LH
Portimonense	LH
Fátima	LH

LH – Liga de Honra PL – Primeira Liga

=== Games ===
Team 1	Agg.	Team 2	1st leg	2nd leg
(PL) Sporting CP	4–4 (a)	Fátima (LH)	1–2	3–2
(PL) Benfica	2–3	Vitória de Setúbal (PL)	1–1	1–2
(LH) Portimonense	2–3	Beira-Mar (LH)	1–0	1–3
(LH) Penafiel	3–2	União de Leiria (PL)	3–1	0–1

(LH) – Liga de Honra
(PL) – Primeira League

==== First leg ====
21 October 2007

Sporting CP	1–2	Fátima
Liédson 52'		Cícero 15' (pen.); Falardo 82'

Estádio do Restelo, Lisbon
Referee: Artur Soares Dias, Porto

21 October 2007

Benfica	1–1	Vitória de Setúbal
Adu 90+4'		Matheus 12'

Estádio da Luz, Lisbon
Referee: Jorge Sousa, Porto

22 October 2007

Portimonense	1–0	Beira-Mar
Melo 71'

Estádio Municipal de Portimão, Portimão
Referee: Pedro Henriques, Lisbon

22 October 2007

Penafiel	3–1	União de Leiria
João Pedro 3'; Bakero 68', 78'		Sougou 90+2'

Estádio Municipal 25 de Abril, Penafiel
Referee: Pedro Proença Lisbon

==== Second leg ====
31 October 2007

Fátima	2–3	Sporting CP
Saleiro 16'; Falardo 49'		Liédson 35', 82'; Purović 62'

Estádio João Paulo II, Fátima
Referee: Olegário Benquerença, Leiria

31 October 2007

Vitória de Setúbal	2–1	Benfica
Matheus 67'; Edinho 82'		Adu 45' (pen.)

Estádio do Bonfim, Setúbal
Referee: Paulo Costa, Porto

31 October 2007

Beira-Mar	3–1	Portimonense
Jessé 48'; Vitinha 65'; Roma 79'		Bevacqua 6'

Estádio Municipal de Aveiro, Aveiro
Referee: João Ferreira, Setúbal

31 October 2007

União de Leiria	1–0	Penafiel
João Paulo 91'

Estádio Dr. Magalhães Pessoa, Leiria
Referee: Paulo Paraty, Porto

== Fifth round ==
The four winners from the fourth round will play in a group stage with a single round-robin format. The teams that finish first and second in the group will advance to play each other in the final.

Pos	Team	Pld	W	D	L	GF	GA	GD	Pts	Qualification
1	Vitória de Setúbal (PL)	3	2	1	0	5	1	+4	7	Advance to final
2	Sporting CP (PL)	3	2	0	1	6	2	+4	6	Advance to final
3	Penafiel (LH)	3	0	2	1	3	5	−2	2	
4	Beira-Mar (LH)	3	0	1	2	1	7	−6	1	

Rules for classification: (LH) - Liga de Honra , (PL) - Portuguese League

=== Games results in detail ===
9 January 2008
19:30

Beira-Mar	1–1	Penafiel
Vitinha 19'		Bakero 44'

Estádio Municipal de Aveiro, Aveiro
Referee: Jorge Sousa, Porto

9 January 2008
21:15

Vitória de Setúbal	1–0	Sporting CP
Gonçalves 30'

Estádio do Bonfim, Setúbal
Referee: Pedro Henriques, Lisbon

23 January 2008
19:00

Penafiel	1–1	Vitória de Setúbal
Guedes 43' (pen.)		Matheus 18'

Estádio Municipal 25 de Abril, Penafiel
Referee: Lucílio Baptista, Setúbal

23 January 2008
21:15

Sporting CP	3–0	Beira-Mar
Liédson 68'; Vukčević 74', 80'

Estádio José Alvalade, Lisbon
Referee: Duarte Gomes, Lisbon

30 January 2008
19:00

Sporting CP	3–1	Penafiel
Romagnoli 21'; Izmailov 29', 85'		Guedes 66'

Estádio José Alvalade, Lisbon
Referee: João Ferreira, Setúbal

30 January 2008
21:00

Vitória de Setúbal	3–0	Beira-Mar
Robson 52'; Chaves 71'; Kim 90+3'

Estádio do Bonfim, Setúbal
Referee: Rui Costa, Porto

== Final ==
22 March 2008
20:30 GMT

Vitória de Setúbal	0–0	Sporting CP
	(Official report)
Penalties
Auri (penalty scored); Pitbull (penalty scored); Elias (penalty scored); Jorginho (penalty missed); Paulinho (penalty missed)	3–2	(penalty scored) Romagnoli; (penalty missed) Polga; (penalty scored) Moutinho; (penalty missed) Liédson; (penalty missed) Izmailov

Estádio Algarve, Faro/Loulé
Referee: Pedro Proença

_{Coin toss determined Vitória to be the first on the penalty shootout series.} _{Except for Jorginho's shot at his right post (inner side), all other shots were saved by the goalkeepers.}
