= Azevedo =

Azevedo is a common surname in the Portuguese language, and thus native to Portugal, Brazil, and other Lusophone nations. The etymology of "Azevedo" is usually connected to the Portuguese word "azevinho" meaning the European holly (Ilex aquifolium). Its Spanish equivalent is Acevedo or Acebedo, whose origin resides in the Leonese municipality of Acebedo, Spain. Notable people with this surname include the following:

- Aluísio Azevedo (1837–1913), Brazilian writer
- Ángela de Azevedo, 17th century Spanish and Portuguese playwright
- Anna Gonsalves Paes de Azevedo (1612–1674), Brazilian plantation owner
- Belmiro de Azevedo (1938–2017), Portuguese entrepreneur and the richest person in Portugal
- Bento da Fonseca de Azevedo, early 18th-century Portuguese master carver
- Eduardo Azevedo (born 1981), Brazilian race car driver
- Fábio Azevedo (born 1999), Brazilian footballer
- Filipa Azevedo (born 1991), Portuguese singer
- Geraldo Azevedo (born 1945), Brazilian singer & guitarist
- Gerard Dominique de Azevedo Coutinho y Bernal, historian and chronicler in the 18th century Southern Netherlands
- Inácio de Azevedo (1526–1570), Jesuit missionary and martyr
- Dom Jerónimo de Azevedo (1560–1625), governor of Portuguese Ceylon and Viceroy of Portuguese India
- José Azevedo (born 1973), Portuguese professional cyclist
- José Batista Pinheiro de Azevedo (1917–1983), Portuguese politician
- Joseph Felix Antoine François de Azevedo Coutinho y Bernal, historian in the 18th century Southern Netherlands
- Justin Azevedo (born 1988), Canadian professional ice hockey player
- Licínio Azevedo (born 1951), Brazilian-Mozambican journalist and filmmaker
- Luiz de Azevedo, Portuguese Jesuit missionary in Ethiopia
- Márcio Azevedo (born 1986), Brazilian footballer
- Count Don Pedro Henriquez d'Azevedo y Toledo de Fuentes (1525–1610), Spanish general and statesman
- Reinaldo Azevedo (born 1961), Brazilian journalist
- Ricardo Azevedo (born 1956), Brazilian professional water polo coach
- Roberto Azevêdo (born 1957), Brazilian WTO diplomat
- Tony Azevedo (born 1981), American water polo player
- Valdir Azevedo (1923–1980), Brazilian conductor and performer
- Erik d'Azevedo (born 1948), American painter and poet
- Yolanda Beltrão de Azevedo (born 1911), Brazilian supercentenarian

== Fictional characters ==
- Manassseh Bueno Barzillai Azevedo da Costa, The King of Schnorrers
