= 2008 Taça da Liga final =

- Event: 2007–08 Taça da Liga
Vitória de Setúbal	Sporting CP
0	0
- Vitória de Setúbal won 3–2 on penalties
- Date: 22 March 2008
- Venue: Estádio do Algarve, Faro
- Man of the Match: Eduardo (Vitória de Setúbal)
- Referee: Pedro Proença (Lisbon)
- Attendance: 28,000

The 2008 Taça da Liga final was the final match of the 2007–08 Taça da Liga, the 1st season of the Taça da Liga, a knockout cup competition organized by the Portuguese League for Professional Football (LPFP). The match was played on the 22 March 2008 at the Estádio do Algarve in Faro, and opposed two Primeira Liga sides Sporting CP and Vitória de Setúbal.

In Portugal, the final was televised live on RTP and Sport TV. Vitória de Setúbal defeated Sporting CP 3–2 on penalties, after both sides were unable to break the deadlock in normal time. As a result of Vitória de Setúbal winning the Taça da Liga, the Sadinos claimed over €500,000 in prize money.

== Route to the final ==
Note: In all results below, the score of the finalist is given first (H: home; A: away).

Vitória de Setúbal			Round	Sporting CP		
Opponent	Result	Stadium	First round	Opponent	Result	Stadium
Bye			First round	Bye		
Opponent	Result	Stadium	Second round	Bye		
Gondomar	3–0 (A)	Estádio de São Miguel	Second round	Bye		
Opponent	Result	Stadium	Third round	Opponent	Result	Stadium
Braga	2–0 (H)	Estádio do Bonfim	Third round	Vitória de Guimarães	0–0 (7–6p) (A)	Estádio D. Afonso Henriques
Opponent	Result	Stadium	Fourth round	Opponent	Result	Stadium
Benfica	1–1 (H)	Estádio do Bonfim	First leg	Fátima	1–2 (H)	Estádio do Restelo
Benfica	2–1 (A)	Estádio da Luz	Second leg	Fátima	3–2 (A)	Estádio Municipal de Fátima
Opponent	Result	Stadium	Fifth round	Opponent	Result	Stadium
Sporting CP	1–0 (H)	Estádio do Bonfim	Matchday 1	Vitória de Setúbal	0–1 (A)	Estádio do Bonfim
Penafiel	1–1 (A)	Estádio Municipal 25 de Abril	Matchday 2	Beira-Mar	3–0 (H)	Estádio de Alvalade
Beira-Mar	3–0 (H)	Estádio do Bonfim	Matchday 3	Penafiel	3–1 (H)	Estádio de Alvalade
Group standings: Team / Pld / W / D / L / GF / GA / GD / Pts; Vitória de Setúbal / 3 / 2 / 1 / 0 / 5 / 1 / +4 / 7; Sporting CP / 3 / 2 / 0 / 1 / 6 / 2 / +4 / 6; Penafiel / 3 / 0 / 2 / 1 / 3 / 5 / −2 / 2; Beira-Mar / 3 / 0 / 1 / 2 / 1 / 7 / −6 / 1			Final standings	Group standings: Team / Pld / W / D / L / GF / GA / GD / Pts; Vitória de Setúbal / 3 / 2 / 1 / 0 / 5 / 1 / +4 / 7; Sporting CP / 3 / 2 / 0 / 1 / 6 / 2 / +4 / 6; Penafiel / 3 / 0 / 2 / 1 / 3 / 5 / −2 / 2; Beira-Mar / 3 / 0 / 1 / 2 / 1 / 7 / −6 / 1		

== Match ==
=== Details ===
22 March 2008
20:30 WEST

Vitória de Setúbal	0 – 0	Sporting CP
Penalties
Auri (penalty scored); Pitbull (penalty scored); Elias (penalty scored); Jorginho (penalty missed); Paulinho (penalty missed)	3–2	(penalty scored) Romagnoli; (penalty missed) Polga; (penalty scored) Moutinho; (penalty missed) Liédson; (penalty missed) Izmailov

Estádio Algarve, Faro
Attendance: 28,000
Referee: Pedro Proença (Lisbon)

Vitória de Setúbal	Sporting CP

GK	77	(Portugal) Eduardo
RB	14	(Cape Verde) Janício
CB	4	(Brazil) Robson
CB	15	(Brazil) Auri
LB	17	(Portugal) Jorginho
CM	6	(Cape Verde) Sandro (c)	(yellow card) 69'
CM	8	(Brazil) Elias
CM	16	(Portugal) Ricardo Chaves
RW	19	(Brazil) Leandro Branco		(substituted off) 78'
LW	7	(Portugal) Bruno Gama		(substituted off) 67'
FW	87	(Brazil) Pitbull
Substitutes:
GK	25	(Serbia) Nikola Milojević
DF	3	(Portugal) Hugo
DF	13	(Brazil) Adalto
DF	18	(Brazil) Paulinho		(substituted in) 67'
MF	10	(Portugal) Filipe Gonçalves		(substituted in) 78'
OM	11	(Portugal) Bruno Ribeiro
FW	28	(Portugal) Bruno Severino		(substituted in) 88'
Manager:
(Portugal) Carlos Carvalhal

GK	1	(Portugal) Rui Patrício
LB	18	(Argentina) Leandro Grimi
CB	13	(Portugal) Tonel
CB	4	(Brazil) Ânderson Polga	(yellow card) 41'
RB	78	(Portugal) Abel		(substituted off) 64'
DM	24	(Portugal) Miguel Veloso	(yellow card) 49'	(substituted off) 79'
CM	7	(Russia) Marat Izmailov
CM	28	(Portugal) João Moutinho (c)
AM	30	(Argentina) Leandro Romagnoli
CF	10	(Montenegro) Simon Vukčević
CF	31	(Brazil) Liédson
Substitutes:
GK	34	(Serbia) Vladimir Stojković
DF	26	(Brazil) Gladstone
MF	6	(Portugal) Adrien Silva		(substituted in) 79'
MF	21	(Sweden) Pontus Farnerud
MF	25	(Portugal) Bruno Pereirinha		(substituted in) 64'
FW	20	(Portugal) Yannick Djaló
FW	22	(Brazil) Rodrigo Tiuí
Manager:
(Portugal) Paulo Bento

2007–08 Taça da Liga Winners
Vitória de Setúbal
1st Title

Man of the match

- (Portugal) Eduardo (Vitória de Setúbal)

Match officials

- Assistant referees:
  - Bertino Miranda (Porto)
  - Luís Marcelino (Leiria)
- Fourth official: Carlos Xistra (Castelo Branco)

Match rules

- 90 minutes.
- Penalty shoot-out if scores still level.
- Seven named substitutes.
- Maximum of three substitutions.
