= Acevedo (surname) =

- Place of origin: Portugal

Acevedo is a surname of Portuguese origin which comes from the town of Azevedo in the Viana do Castelo District in Portugal. It means a grove of holly trees or hollywood, as the Portuguese and Spanish word for holly is acebo. The surname changed from Azevedo to Acevedo when it passed to Spain. As a consequence of colonization, it is widely spread in Latin America. There is also the Acebedo variant, whose origin resides in the Asturian municipality of Acebedo, Spain. Notable people with the surname include:

- Aníbal Santiago Acevedo (born 1971), Puerto Rican boxer
- Anthony Acevedo (1924–2018), Mexican-American engineer and soldier
- Armando Acevedo Milan (born 1937), Mexican chess master
- Art Acevedo (born 1964), Cuban-American Houston chief of police
- Carlos Acévedo (born 1996), Mexican football player
- Dariam Acevedo (born 1984), Puerto Rican female beach volleyball player
- Domingo Acevedo (born 1994), Dominican baseball relief pitcher
- Elizabeth Acevedo (born 1988), Dominican-American poet and author
- Fernando Acevedo (1946–2024), Peruvian track and field athlete
- Francisco Acevedo (born 1968), American serial killer
- Jackie Acevedo (born 1987), Mexican-American football player
- Janier Acevedo (born 1985), Colombian cyclist
- Javier Acevedo, Canadian swimmer
- José Acevedo (baseball) (born 1977), Dominican baseball pitcher
- José Acevedo (sprinter) (born 1986), Venezuelan sprinter
- Juan Acevedo (born 1970), Mexican baseball player
- Kirk Acevedo (born 1971), American actor
- María Candelaria Acevedo (born 1958), Chilean politician
- Maria Dolores Acevedo (1932–1998), Spanish writer
- Mario Acevedo (born 1969), Guatemalan football forward
- Nelson Acevedo (born 1988), Argentine footballer
- Óscar Acevedo (born 1997), Nicaraguan footballer
- Rafael Acevedo (cyclist) (born 1957), Colombian cyclist
- Raymond Acevedo (born 1971), Puerto Rican rock singer
- Sebastián Acevedo (1931–1983), Chilean self-immolator
- Sergio Acevedo (born 1956), Argentine politician
- Vicente María de Acevedo (1760–1808), Spanish army officer

== See also ==
- Azevedo, related Portuguese surname
