= Vicente Lusitano =

Portuguese composer (c. 1520–1561)

Vicente Lusitano (c. 1520 – c. 1561) was a Portuguese composer and music theorist of the late Renaissance. Some of his works on musical theory and a small number of compositions survive. Lusitano was for a time a Catholic priest and taught in several Italian cities, but later converted to Protestantism.

He is believed to have been of mixed race. Since the 1980s, he has been described as the first published black composer.

== Life and career ==
Lusitano, a Portuguese-language term for "Portuguese", appears to be a descriptive nickname rather than a family name. Little is known of his life. He was born in Olivença, likely around 1520. Lusitano is described as pardo, a Portuguese term indicating he was of mixed European and non-European heritage. (Note: Only in the 1960s and 70s was a 17th-century manuscript discovered describing him as "homem pardo", i.e., a mixed-race person with African origins.) It has been suggested that his mother may have been of African descent. According to a manuscript by the 17th-century Portuguese critic João Franco Barreto, Lusitano came from Olivença, became a Catholic priest, and was employed as a teacher at Padua, Viterbo and Rome. (Note: Barreto's manuscript was used by Diogo Barbosa Machado in his Bibliotheca Luzitana, published in Lisbon by Ignacio Rodrigues in 1752.) His books and manuscripts of his musical compositions survive and are dated. Lusitano was in Rome by 1551. From the dedication of one of his first works, it has been suggested that Lusitano was a tutor to the Portuguese Lencastre family, who also arrived in Rome in 1551 as ambassador to the Papal court. By 1561 he had married, converted to Calvinist Protestantism, and traveled to Germany. There is no record of him after 1561.

In the 16th century, composers were usually employed by the Church, but there is no evidence that he held such a salaried post.

When he last appears in the historical record he was living in the Duchy of Württemberg.

== Music ==
As a composer, Lusitano is known for his vocal works, including Latin motets and a madrigal. In several works he references Josquin des Prez, who had died 30 years earlier. For example, he reworked des Prez' motet Inviolata, integra for more voices.

His compositions, composed in (or about) the contrapuntal Renaissance style of his time and place, include:

- "Heu me domine", a motet included in Tratado de canto de organo (ca. 1551; see below)
- Liber primus epigramatum que vulgo motetta dicuntur, containing 23 motets for 5, 6, or 8 voices (Rome: Valerio & Luigi Dorico, 1551)
- "All’hor ch’ignuda d’herb’et fior la terra", a madrigal published in the anthology Il primo libro delle muse (Venice: Scotto, 1562)
- Beati omnes qui timent Dominum, a motet in a collective manuscript of motets and other sacred songs, compiled for the Stuttgart ducal court in 1562

Lusitano also wrote treatises. These are:

- An anonymous manuscript on the art of counterpoint (ca. 1551), attributed to Lusitano on stylistic grounds, and published as Un tratado de canto de órgano (siglo XVI) in 1913.
- Introdvttione facilissima, et novissima, di Canto Fermo, Figvrato, Contrapon to semplice, et in concerto. Con Regole Generali per far fvghe differenti sopra il Canto Fermo, a ii, iii & iiii. voci, & compositioni, proportioni, generi. S. Diatonico, Cromotico, Enarmonico (Rome: Antonio Blado, 1553; Venice: Francesco Marcolini, 1558; Venice: Francesco Rampazetto, 1561). All three editions dedicated to Marc' Antonio Colonna, Duke of Marsi.This treatise was reportedly also translated into Portuguese by Bernardo da Fonseca (Lisbon, 1603).

Lusitano was notable during his lifetime for his work as a theorist. In a 1551 debate in Rome, he espoused traditional views on the role of the three genera in music (diatonic, chromatic and enharmonic) over more radical ones put forward by Nicola Vicentino. Lusitano was deemed to have won the debate and Vicentino was fined. In 1555 Vicentino published an account of the debate that was recognised as misleading. This went on to influence later composers and may be a factor in omission of Lusitano from subsequent works on early European composers.

Lusitano's Introduttione facilissima, et novissima, di canto fermo, figurato, contraponto semplice, et inconcerto (Rome, 1553, plus reprints), contains an introduction to music, his views on the three genera, and uniquely, a systematic section on creating improvised counterpoint by setting new parts above or below a cantus firmus). Musicologist Philippe Canguilhem stated that "the significance of Lusitano’s writings is that they show how central improvised counterpoint was to everyday musical life during the Renaissance".

Lusitano's music has been revived in recent years, for example by the Australian Chamber Choir in 2019 the Marian Consort in 2021 and Chineke! Voices in 2022. His motet Heu me Domine and 1562 madrigal All’hor ch’ignuda have been recorded.

== Reception ==
Up until the late 19th century, Lusitano was overlooked in English-language histories of music: sometimes omitted altogether, more often covered minimally. However, he has been studied by Portuguese musicologists like Maria Augusta Barbosa, who wrote a dissertation about him in 1977, originally in German and present until this day in Portuguese musicological investigation of the 16th century. Since the summer of 2020, when the Black Lives Matter movement re-ignited discussions about race in the United States, there has been a flurry of interest in Lusitano and his work.

His works have been edited in modern editions by several Portuguese musicologists since at least 1952, when Manuel Joaquim first published Lusitano's madrigal All'hor ch'ignuda d'herb et fior in the Portuguese journal Gazeta Musical, and has continued until our days with the modern publishing of motets like Regina coeli and Heu me Domine in 2012 by mpmp. In 2022, the music historian Joseph McHardy also made Lusitano's scores accessible in modern editions on the Internet, which allowed dozens of non-Portuguese-speaking choirs to perform and record his music. Previous recordings includes the anthology Cançoes, Vilancicos, e Motettes Portugueses Séculos XVI-XVII, by Huelgas Ensemble, Sony Classics, 1994.

== Works ==
=== Motets ===
- Praeter rerum seriem
- Inviolata, integra et casta es
- Salve regina
- Emendemus in melius
- Regina caeli
- Aspice Domine
