= João Pedro Silva =

João Pedro Silva may refer to:

- João Pedro (footballer, born December 1987) (João Pedro Azevedo Silva), Portuguese footballer
- João Pedro Silva (triathlete) (born 1989), Portuguese triathlete
- João Pedro Silva (handballer) (born 1994), Brazilian handball player
