= Carrazedo de Montenegro =

- Civil parish
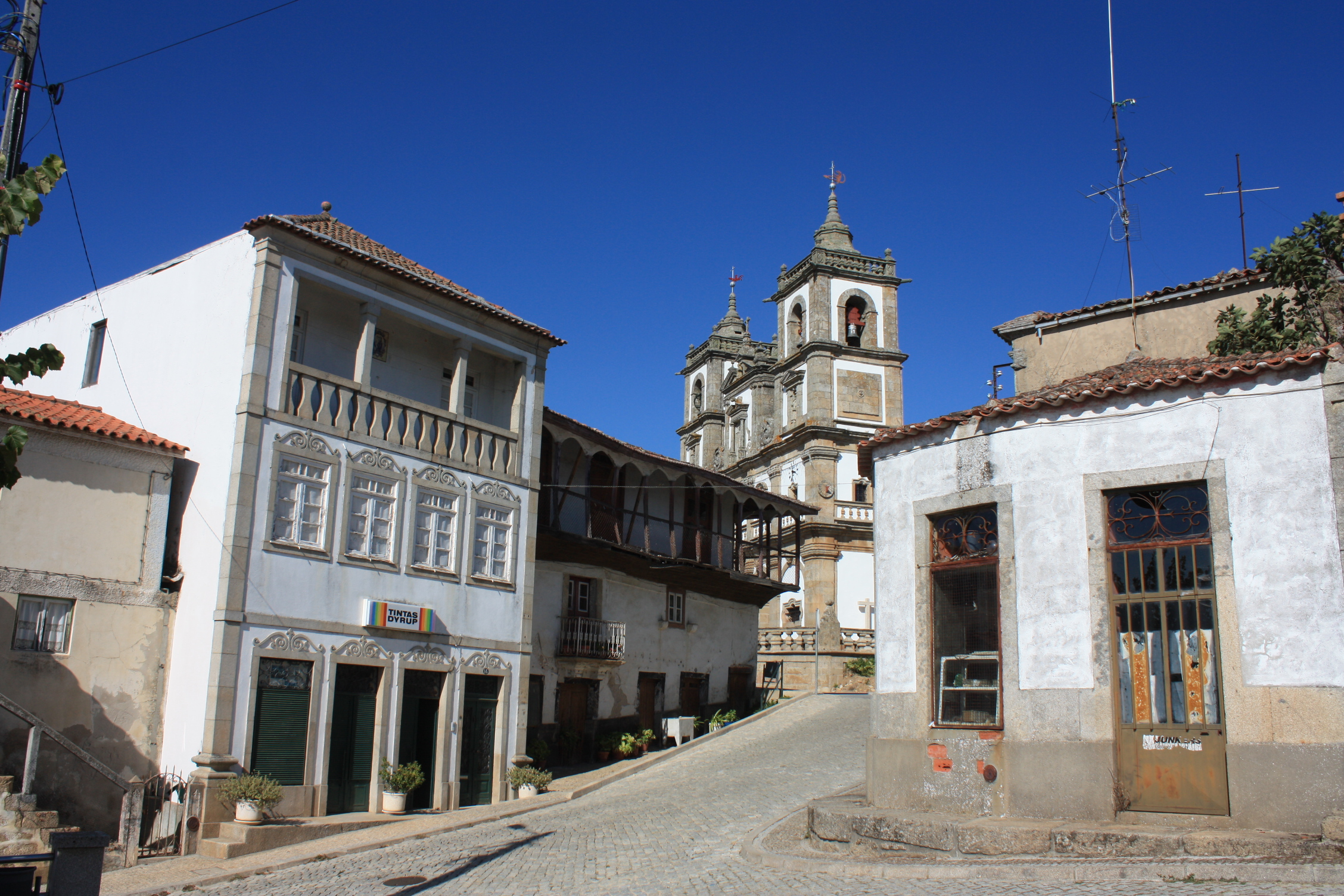
- Carrazedo de Montenegro showing the Church of São Nicolau in the background

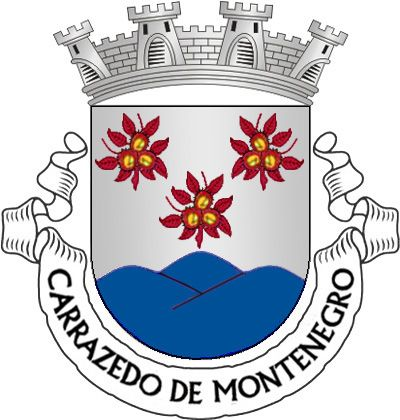
- Coat of arms

- Location in Portugal
- Coordinates: 41°34′N 7°26′W
- Country: Portugal
- Region: Norte
- Intermunic. comm.: Alto Tâmega
- District: Vila Real
- Municipality: Valpaços
- Established: before 1155

Area
  - Total: 29.08 km^{2} (11.23 sq mi)

Population (2011)
  - Total: 1,620
  - Density: 55.7/km^{2} (144/sq mi)
- Time zone: UTC+00:00 (WET)
  - Summer (DST): UTC+01:00 (WEST)
- Website: https://valpacos.pt/pages/517?locale=en

Carrazedo de Montenegro is a town and former Portuguese parish in the municipality of Valpaços.

Carrazedo de Montenegro has its origins in a Roman Hillfort called Castro de Ribas. The first written reference to this town name is from 1155. The record refers to a donation of land by a man named Pedro Fernandes, to the Archbishop of Braga. The historical weight is evident in the town, with 3 Foral cards having been granted by King Denis of Portugal. The First assigned on August 12, 1301, Vila Boa de Montenegro, announcing the payment of an annual rent of 3000 pounds. The charter is renewed two years later announcing that the rent is now paid in two installments. Due to the lack of rent payments, the integration of the village into the municipality of Chaves was decreed. This integration took place conflictingly for years until at the end of the 17th century, the lands of Montenegro had their municipality restored again, being promoted to town in 1820 and the head of court in the region of Chaves.

The previous parish was extinct by the reorganization of the Portuguese territory that happened between 2012/2013, with its territory being integrated into the new parish of Carrazedo de Montenegro e Curros.

The town, as of 2011, has 1620 inhabitants, and covers up 2908 km2, giving a population density of around 0.56 people per km2.

The town is nicknamed Capital of the Chestnut.
