= Ángela de Azevedo =

Portuguese playwright (born c. 1665)

Ângela de Azevedo
- Ângela de Azevedo
- Born: c. 1665; Paredes da Beira, Portugal
- Died: Before 1723; Soutelo do Douro, Portugal
- Citizenship: Portuguese
- Occupation: Playwright
- Writing career
- Language: Spanish
- Notable work: El muerto disimulado (Presumed Dead)

Ángela de Azevedo (in Spanish, Acevedo) was a 17th century Portuguese playwright.

== Biography ==
=== Controversy about the period and circumstances of her life ===
According to Damião de Froes Perym, an 18th century Portuguese author, Ângela de Azevedo was born in Lisbon, likely in the early 17th century, to a nobleman of the Royal House, João de Azevedo Pereira and his wife Izabel de Oliveira. Perym writes that she spent time in the court of Philip IV of Spain in Madrid as a handmaiden to the king's wife Elisabeth of Bourbon. and notes that Azevedo married sometime before Elisabeth's death in 1644, but does not record her husband's name. After his death, she supposedly retired with her daughter to a Benedictine convent in Portugal where she lived until her death.

However, another 18th century Portuguese author, Diogo Barbosa Machado, in the second and in the fourth volumes of his Bilbiotheca Lusitana, presented a very different version of Ângela de Azevedo's life, stating that she was a daughter of Tomé de Azevedo, a military leader in the Portuguese Restoration War (1640–1668), and his wife Dona Maria de Almeida.

=== Recent research on her biography ===
Recent research has corroborated Barbosa Machado's version, showing on the basis of documents retrieved from Portuguese archives that Ângela de Azevedo was indeed born in the second half of the 17th century, probably around 1665, in Paredes da Beira, Portugal, to Tomé de Azevedo, governor of the Castle Fortress of Almeida, and his wife Maria de Almeida.

She was brought up in the manor house of Azevedo, in Paredes da Beira, an estate that had belonged to her family since the Middle Ages, and where she married Francisco de Ansiâes de Figueiredo on November 1, 1693. She moved with her husband to nearby Soutelo do Douro, where she mostly spent the rest of her life and where she would die, sometime before 1723. She had no children from her marriage. Like her sister Luísa, who would inherit the Azevedo estate, Ângela de Azevedo was fluent in Portuguese, Spanish and Latin. This literary inclination and linguistic proficiency of the Azevedo family would be continued two generations later, namely through Ângela de Azevedo's grandnephew, the Jesuit Emanuel de Azevedo, author of several works that he published in Italy, in Latin and Italian.

She wrote all her works in Spanish. Her play "El muerto disimulado (Presumed Dead)" has been recently re-edited, with a translation into English; in this work Ângela de Azevedo "posits a feminist discourse by constructing a protagonist, Jacinta, who breaks with the traditional female role of passive object to take control of narrative and emplotment as the speaking subject."

Ângela de Azevedo is one of six known female playwrights of seventeenth century Spain.

== Works ==
She wrote several plays, three of which have survived to the present:

- El muerto disimulado (The Feigned Death),
- La Margarita del Tajo que dió nombre a Santarem (Margarita of Tajo Who Gave Her Name to Santarem), and
- Dicha y desdicha del juego y devoción de la Virgen (Bliss and Misfortune in the Game and Devotion to the Virgin).

All three are written in Spanish and placed in Portugal. The first has a secular theme, while the remaining two have typically religious themes. It is thought that her plays may have been staged in the royal palace.
