= Liegos =

- Locality
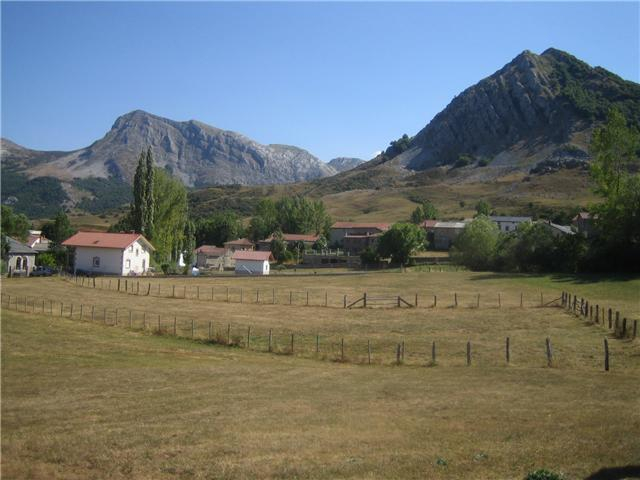

- Location within Province of León Location within Castile and León Location within Spain
- Coordinates: 43°1′30″N 5°4′32″W
- Country: Spain
- Autonomous community: Castile and León
- Province: Province of León
- Municipality: Acebedo
- Elevation: 1,128 m (3,701 ft)

Population
  - Total: 44

Liegos is a locality located in the municipality of Acebedo, in León province, Castile and León, Spain. As of 2020, it has a population of 44.

== Geography ==
Liegos is located 112km northeast of León.
