= Kim Byung-suk =

South Korean footballer (born 1985)

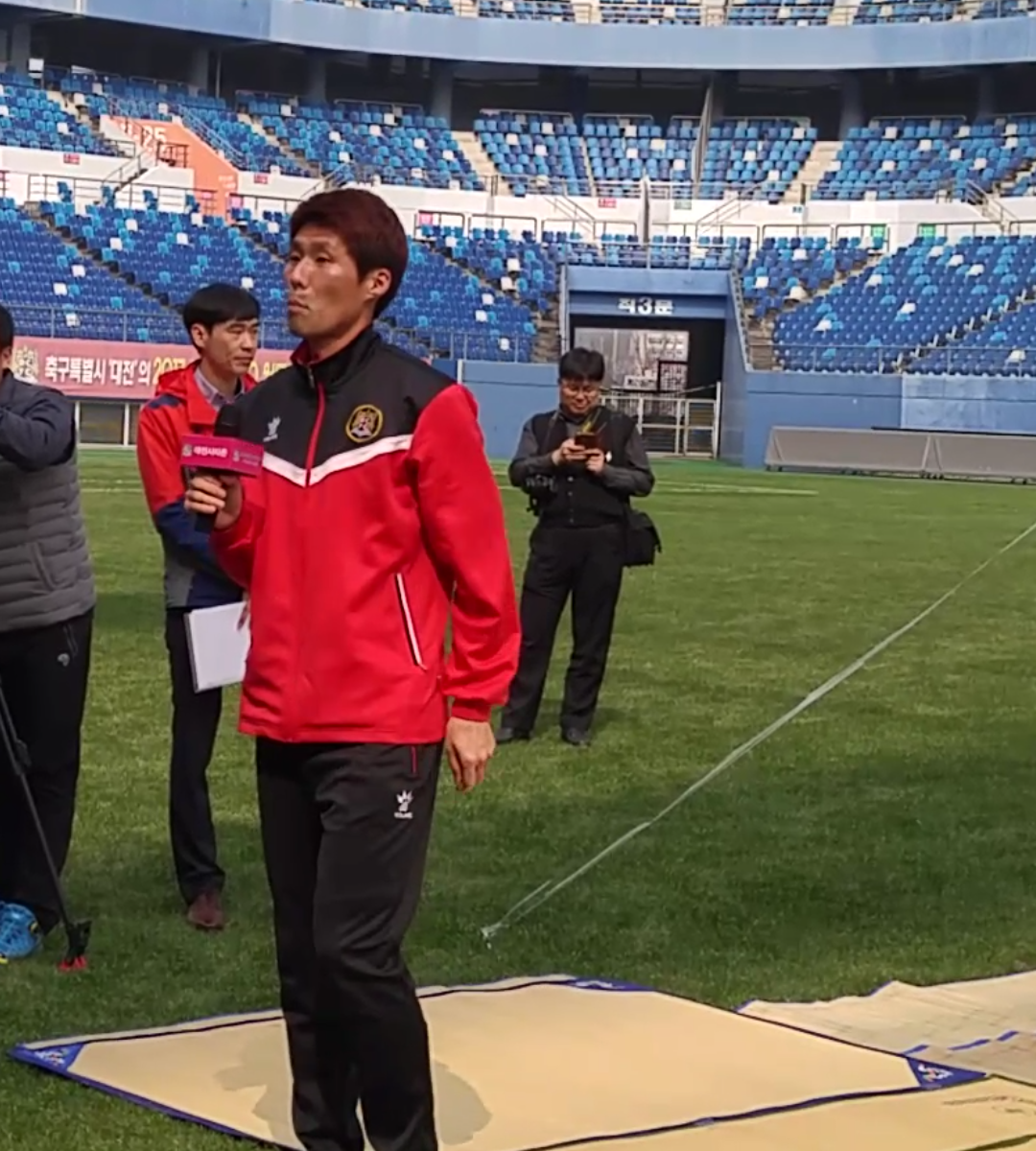

Personal information
- Full name: Kim Byung-suk
- Date of birth: 17 September 1985 (age 41)
- Place of birth: Seoul, South Korea
- Height: 1.85 m (6 ft 1 in)
- Position: Attacking midfielder

Team information
- Current team: Ansan Greeners

Youth career
- 2004–2006: Soongsil University

Senior career*
Years	Team	Apps	(Gls)
2007–2008	Vitória Setúbal	16	(1)
2009–2010	Montedio Yamagata	22	(2)
2011	Sagan Tosu	17	(4)
2012	Al Nassr	5	(1)
2012–2016	Daejeon Citizen	89	(8)
2014–2015	→ Ansan Police (army)	50	(1)
2017	Seoul E-Land	2	(0)
2017–	Ansan Greeners	15	(1)
- * Club domestic league appearances and goals as of 30 January 2018

- Kim Byung-suk
- Hangul: 김병석
- Hanja: 金秉析
- RR: Gim Byeongseok
- MR: Kim Pyŏngsŏk

Kim Byung-suk (Korean: 김병석; born 17 September 1985) is a South Korean footballer who plays for the K League 2 side Ansan Greeners.

== Club career ==
Kim Byung-Suk started his professionally in 2007 on Portuguese Liga side Vitória Setúbal. On 30 December 2008, he signed for J1 League side Montedio Yamagata. He scored on his J1 League debut for Montedio Yamagata on 7 March, in the opening day win over Júbilo Iwata. On 1 December 2010, his contract was terminated, ending his two-year stay at the club.

On 2 March 2011, Kim joined J2 League club Sagan Tosu. On 18 January 2012, Kim moved from Japan to Saudi Arabia for Al Nassr FC, signing a six-month deal.

== Club statistics ==
Club performance			League		Cup		League Cup		Continental		Total	
Season	Club	League	Apps	Goals	Apps	Goals	Apps	Goals	Apps	Goals	Apps	Goals
Portugal			League		Taça de Portugal		Taça da Liga		Europe		Total	
2006–07	Vitória Setúbal	Portuguese Liga	11	1	–		–		0	0	11	1
2007–08	Vitória Setúbal	Portuguese Liga	5	0	–		2	2	–		7	2
Japan			League		Emperor's Cup		League Cup		Asia		Total	
2009	Montedio Yamagata	J1 League	15	2	1	0	5	1	–		21	3
2010	Montedio Yamagata	J1 League	7	0	2	0	1	0	–		10	0
2011	Sagan Tosu	J2 League	17	4	1	0	–		–		18	4
Saudi Arabia			League		Crown Prince Cup		League Cup		Asia		Total	
2011–12	Al-Nasr	Saudi Professional League	5	1	1	0	–		–		6	1
South Korea			League		KFA Cup		League Cup		Asia		Total	
2012	Daejeon Citizen	K-League	18	4	1	0					19	4
2013	Daejeon Citizen	K-League										
Total	Portugal		16	1			2	2	0	0	18	3
Total	Japan		39	6	3	0	6	1	–		48	7
Total	South Korea		18	4	1	0	0	0	0	0	19	4
Total	Saudi Arabia		5	1	1	0	–		–		6	1
Career total			78	12	5	0	8	3	0	0	91	15

== Honours ==
Vitória de Setúbal

- Taça da Liga: 2007–08

Sporting positions
Preceded by An Sang-hyun	Daejeon Citizen captain 2015-2016	Succeeded by Kim Jin-kyu
