= La Uña =

- Locality
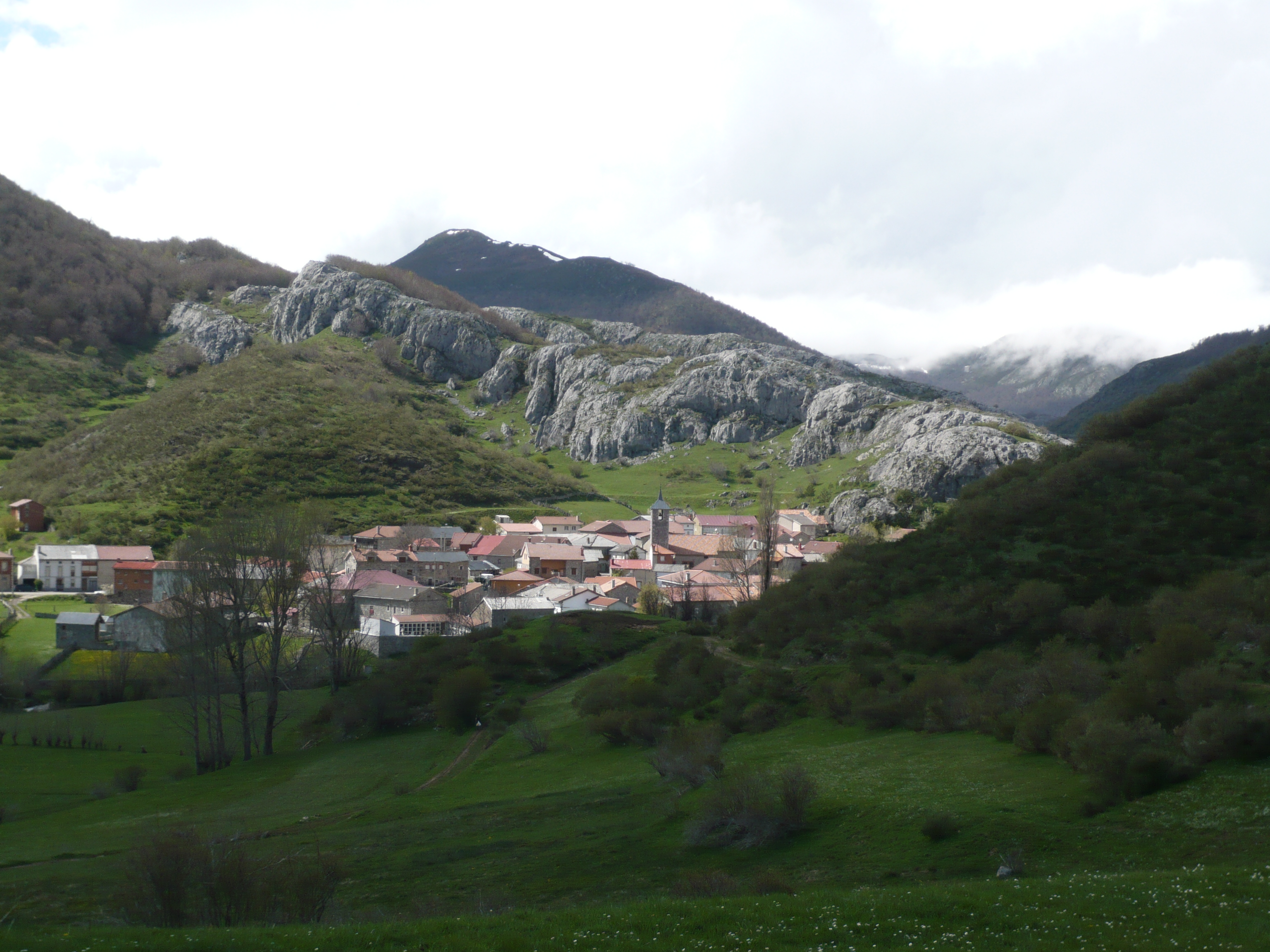

- Location within Province of León Location within Castile and León Location within Spain
- Coordinates: 43°3′51″N 5°8′16″W
- Country: Spain
- Autonomous community: Castile and León
- Province: Province of León
- Municipality: Acebedo
- Elevation: 1,190 m (3,900 ft)

Population
  - Total: 37

La Uña is a locality located in the municipality of Acebedo, in León province, Castile and León, Spain. As of 2020, it has a population of 37.

== Geography ==
La Uña is located 96km northeast of León, Spain.
