= Coronado (São Romão e São Mamede) =

- Civil parish
- Location in Portugal
- Coordinates: 41.283°N 8.567°W
- Country: Portugal
- Region: Norte
- Metropolitan area: Porto
- District: Porto
- Municipality: Trofa

Area
  - Total: 10.98 km^{2} (4.24 sq mi)

Population (2011)
  - Total: 9,119
  - Density: 830/km^{2} (2,200/sq mi)
- Time zone: UTC+00:00 (WET)
  - Summer (DST): UTC+01:00 (WEST)

Coronado (São Romão e São Mamede) is a civil parish in the municipality of Trofa, Portugal. It was formed in 2013 by the merger of the former parishes São Romão and São Mamede. The population in 2011 was 9,119, in an area of 10.98 km^{2}. The town Coronado is an industrial center.
