= André Viana =

Portuguese footballer

Personal information
- Full name: André Vieira Viana
- Date of birth: 27 December 1992 (age 33)
- Place of birth: Trofa, Portugal
- Height: 1.81 m (5 ft 11 1/2 in)
- Position: Midfielder

Youth career
- 2005–2011: Trofense

Senior career*
Years	Team	Apps	(Gls)
2011–2019	Trofense	80	(6)
2019	Pedras Rubras	11	(1)
- * Club domestic league appearances and goals as of 22:33, 13 October 2019 (UTC)

André Vieira Viana (born 27 December 1992) is a Portuguese footballer who plays as a midfielder.

== Club career ==
He made his professional debut in the Segunda Liga for Trofense on 2 October 2011 in a game against Belenenses.
