= Valpaços =

- Municipality
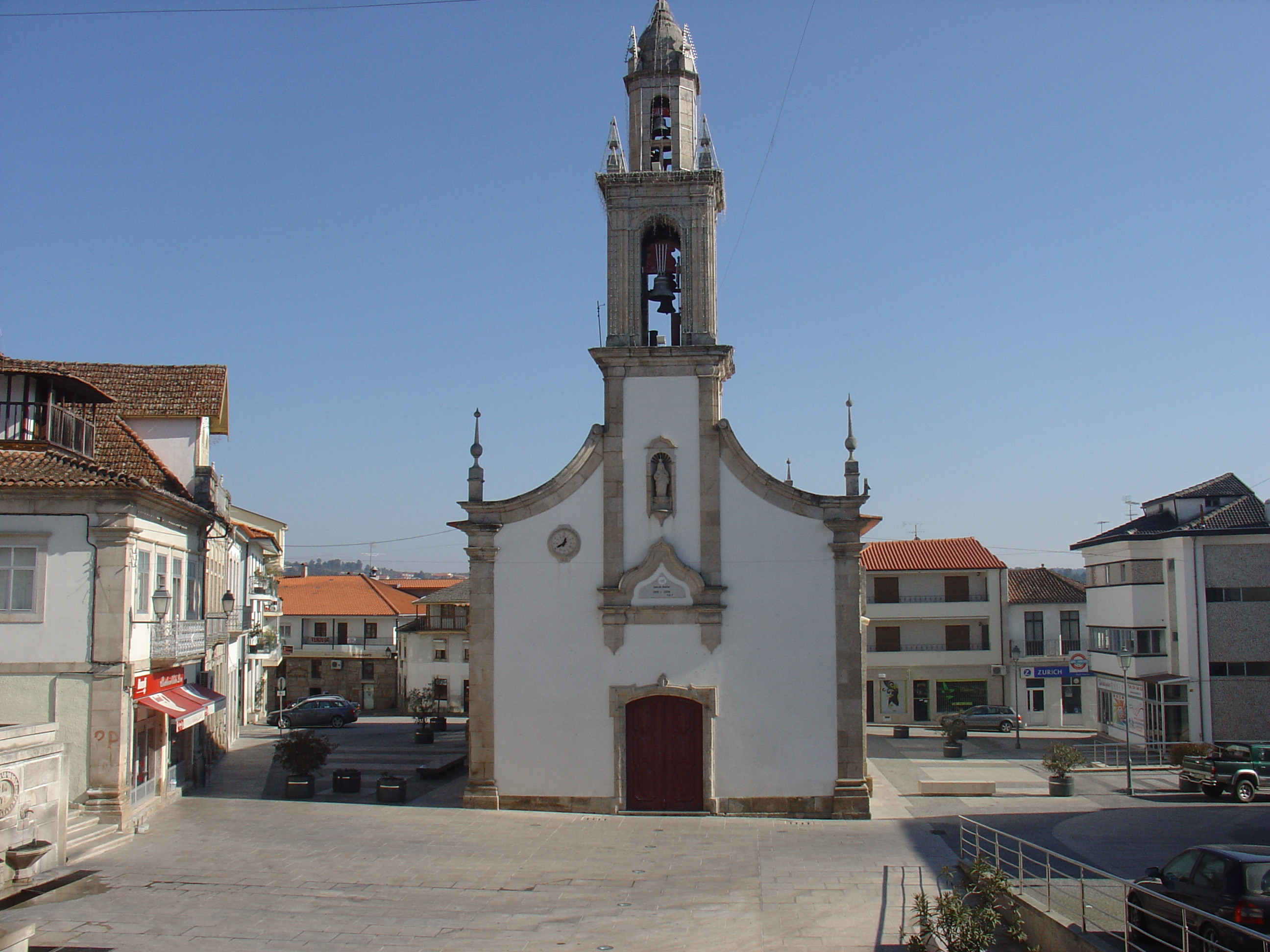

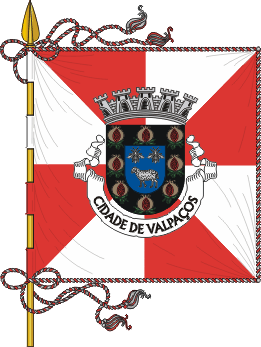
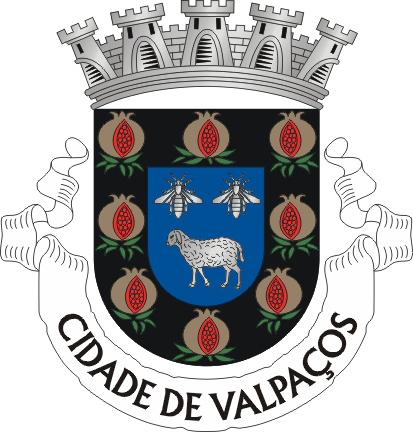
- Flag Coat of arms
- Interactive map of Valpaços
- Coordinates: 41°36′35″N 7°18′44″W
- Country: Portugal
- Region: Norte
- Intermunic. comm.: Alto Tâmega
- District: Vila Real
- Parishes: 25 (see text)

Government
  - President: Amílcar Almeida (PPD-PSD)

Area
  - Total: 548.74 km^{2} (211.87 sq mi)
- Elevation: 515 m (1,690 ft)

Population (2011)
  - Total: 16,882
  - Density: 30.765/km^{2} (79.681/sq mi)
- Time zone: UTC+00:00 (WET)
  - Summer (DST): UTC+01:00 (WEST)
- Postal code: 5430
- Area code: 278
- Patron: Nossa Senhora da Saúde
- Website: http://www.valpacos.pt

Valpaços (Portuguese pronunciation: [ˌvalˈpasuʃ]) is a municipality in northern Portugal. The population in 2011 was 16,882, in an area of 548.74 km^{2}.

== History ==
The first documents that cite Valpaços date back to the 12th century. Its toponymy evolved from pre-national settlements, and started as a small enclave inhabited by nobles and signeurial family estates, attracted by the privileges given for settling so close to the Castilian border. The nascent Portuguese community was susceptible to attacks from Castile. The establishment of border settlements fixed the border.

Historically, Vale de Paço (and later Vale de Paços until the 19th century) was an area with roots in the Roman period of settlement, yet influenced by Germanic settlers before Portugal became a Kingdom.

The most important event in the regions history occurred in the 19th century. On 16 November 1846, during the Patuleia conflict, a movement that was apolitical turned bloody, resulting in the deaths of 200 people, before the battle proceeded into the lands of Murça.

== Geography ==
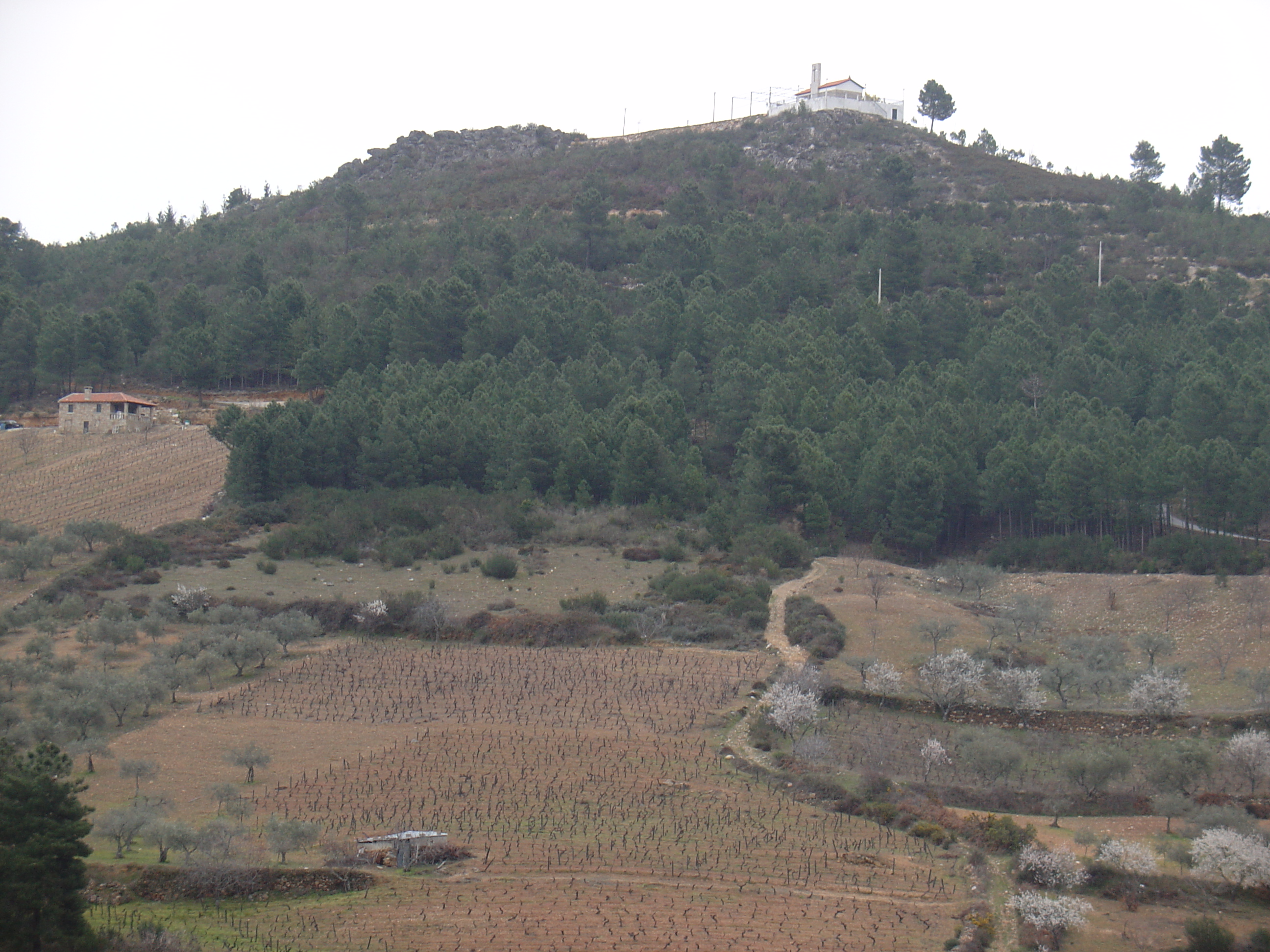
Monte de Santa Isabel in the area of Cancelo

Valpaços is located in the northern interior of Portugal in the Alto Trás-os-Montes region, and part of the district of Vila Real. It is confined in the north by the municipality of Chaves, to the east by Mirandela and Vinhais, to the south by Murça and Mirandela and in the west by Chaves and Vila Pouca de Aguiar.

From north to south, the Transmontanan relief is exemplified by planar stretches of the Iberian Meseta, with altitudes between 700–800 metres above sea level, tending to have a regular profile north of the Douro River.

Regional and national connections between the municipality and its neighbours are completed across several of its primary and secondary roadways: the 213 (Chaves–Valpaços-Mirandela-Vila Flor); the 103 (Viana do Castelo-Braga–Chaves-Bragança); the 206 (Vila do Conde–Valpaços–Bragança); and the 314 (Chaves–Carrazedo de Montenegro-Murça IP4). The important link is the 206 to A24, which links Valpaços with Vila Real, Viseu and internationally to Spain (Espanha–Verin-A52 roadway), and the national A7 which permits a rapid connection with the coast (Guimarães, Braga and Porto). The ancillary connection to the national 213 also permits a rapid connection to the IP4, which links Valpaços with Porto, Vila Real and Bragança.

=== Climate ===
Valpaços has a dry, hot-summer Mediterranean climate with cold, moderately wet winters and dry summers.

Climate data for Rio Torto, Valpaços, 1985-2021, altitude: 322 m (1,056 ft)
Month	Jan	Feb	Mar	Apr	May	Jun	Jul	Aug	Sep	Oct	Nov	Dec	Year
Daily mean °C (°F)	5.5 (41.9)	8.1 (46.6)	10.8 (51.4)	13.0 (55.4)	17.0 (62.6)	20.9 (69.6)	24.0 (75.2)	23.6 (74.5)	20.4 (68.7)	14.8 (58.6)	9.8 (49.6)	6.9 (44.4)	14.6 (58.2)
Average precipitation mm (inches)	51.0 (2.01)	44.8 (1.76)	26.1 (1.03)	37.0 (1.46)	41.3 (1.63)	23.5 (0.93)	11.5 (0.45)	12.2 (0.48)	24.1 (0.95)	64.9 (2.56)	62.2 (2.45)	59.6 (2.35)	458.2 (18.06)
Source: Portuguese Environment Agency

=== Parishes ===
Administratively, the municipality is divided into 25 civil parishes (freguesias):

- Água Revés e Crasto
- Algeriz / Argeriz
- Bouçoães
- Canaveses
- Carrazedo de Montenegro e Curros
- Ervões
- Fornos do Pinhal
- Friões
- Lebução, Fiães e Nozelos
- Padrela e Tazem
- Possacos
- Rio Torto
- Santa Maria de Emeres
- Santa Valha
- Santiago da Ribeira de Alhariz
- São João da Corveira
- São Pedro de Veiga de Lila
- Serapicos
- Sonim e Barreiros
- Tinhela e Alvarelhos
- Vales
- Valpaços e Sanfins
- Vassal
- Veiga de Lila
- Vilarandelo

== Notable people ==
- Luís de Azevedo (1573–1634), Jesuit scholar and missionary to Ethiopia
- Manuel Buíça (1876–1908), schoolteacher and soldier involved in the Lisbon Regicide
- Maria da Assunção Esteves (born 1956), politician, President of the Assembly of the Republic of Portugal & MEP
- Ricardo Chaves (born 1977), footballer with 382 club caps

== See also ==
- Valpaços IPR
