= Simãozinho =

Portuguese footballer

Personal information
- Full name: Simão Pedro Soares Azevedo
- Date of birth: 31 May 1995 (age 31)
- Place of birth: Trofa, Portugal
- Height: 1.80 m (5 ft 11 in)
- Positions: Left-back; winger

Team information
- Current team: Leixões
- Number: 15

Youth career
- 2004–2014: Trofense

Senior career*
Years	Team	Apps	(Gls)
2014–2015	Trofense	32	(1)
2015−2019	Braga B	135	(5)
2016	Braga	0	(0)
2019−2020	Estoril	6	(0)
2020	Chaves	3	(0)
2020−2023	Penafiel	75	(1)
2023−2024	Torreense	4	(0)
2024−	Leixões	70	(3)

International career
2014	Portugal U20	1	(0)
2016	Portugal U21	3	(0)
- * Club domestic league appearances and goals as of 19 June 2026

Simão Pedro Soares Azevedo (born 31 May 1995), known as Simãozinho, is a Portuguese professional footballer who plays as a left-back or left winger for Liga Portugal 2 club Leixões.

== Club career ==
Born in Trofa, Porto District, Simãozinho began his career at his hometown club C.D. Trofense in the Segunda Liga in 2014. He totalled 35 games in his first full season as a professional, scoring once in a 2–0 home win against FC Porto B on 9 November 2014.

Simãozinho transferred to S.C. Braga in July 2015, being assigned to their reserves in the same league. He made his debut for the first team on 20 January 2016 in a Taça da Liga group match away to Leixões SC, as a 68th-minute substitute for Stian Ringstad in a 4–0 victory.

On 24 June 2019, free agent Simãozinho signed with G.D. Estoril Praia still in the Portuguese second tier. The following transfer window, he joined G.D. Chaves of the same league.

Simãozinho continued competing in the second division the following seasons, with F.C. Penafiel, S.C.U. Torreense and Leixões.

== International career ==
Simãozinho earned the first of his three caps for Portugal at under-21 level on 6 October 2016, starting a 3–3 draw in Hungary for the 2017 UEFA European Championship qualifiers.
