= Bougado (São Martinho e Santiago) =

- Civil parish
- Location in Portugal
- Coordinates: 41.337°N 8.559°W
- Country: Portugal
- Region: Norte
- Metropolitan area: Porto
- District: Porto
- Municipality: Trofa

Area
  - Total: 28.69 km^{2} (11.08 sq mi)

Population (2011)
  - Total: 21,585
  - Density: 750/km^{2} (1,900/sq mi)
- Time zone: UTC+00:00 (WET)
  - Summer (DST): UTC+01:00 (WEST)

Bougado (São Martinho e Santiago) is a civil parish in the municipality of Trofa, Portugal. It was formed in 2013 by the merger of the former parishes São Martinho and Santiago. The population in 2011 was 21,585, in an area of 28.69 km^{2}. The parish forms the city center of Trofa.
