= Trofa =

- Municipality
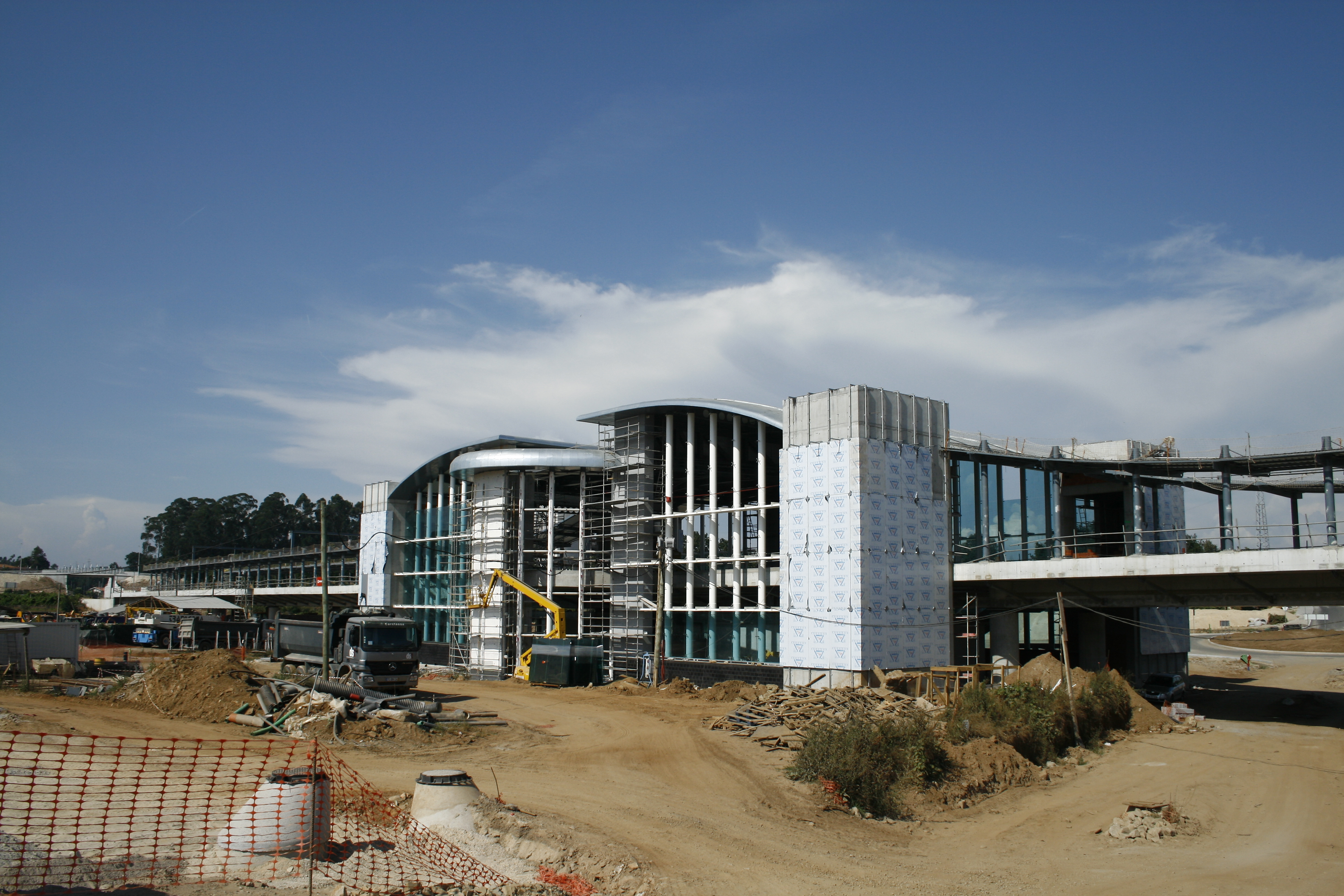
- Trofa train station under construction

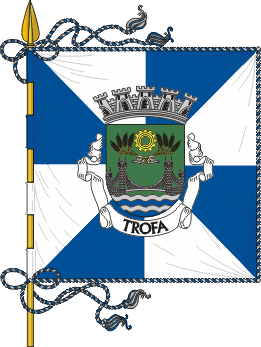
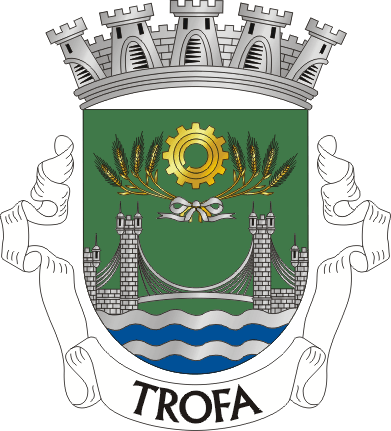
- Flag Coat of arms
- Interactive map of Trofa
- Coordinates: 41°21′N 8°33′W
- Country: Portugal
- Region: Norte
- Metropolitan area: Porto
- District: Porto
- Parishes: 5

Government
  - President: António Azevedo (PSD/CDS–PP)

Area
  - Total: 72.02 km^{2} (27.81 sq mi)

Population (2021)
  - Total: 38,548
  - Density: 535.2/km^{2} (1,386/sq mi)
- Time zone: UTC+00:00 (WET)
  - Summer (DST): UTC+01:00 (WEST)
- Local holiday: Nossa Senhora das Dores; 19 November
- Website: www.mun-trofa.pt

Trofa (Portuguese pronunciation: [ˈtɾɔfɐ]) is a city and a municipality in the north of the Porto metropolitan area in Portugal, 18 kilometres (11 mi) from Porto. The population in 2021 was 38,548, in an area of 72.02 square kilometres (27.81 mi^{2}). The city centre is formed by the parish Bougado (São Martinho e Santiago), which had 21,374 inhabitants in 2021. Another important locality in the municipality is Coronado.

Trofa has an industrial park, with various types of businesses including pharmaceutical, metalworking and textile industries. Bial, one of the largest pharmaceutical companies in Portugal is headquartered in Coronado.

== History ==
=== Early years ===
Archaeological evidence suggests that the region now known as Trofa has been inhabited for thousands of years. Significant findings include 34 bronze axes discovered in São Martinho de Bougado, now housed in the Sociedade Martins Sarmento in Guimarães. Other notable prehistoric landmarks include rock carvings in the village of Maganha and the Castro of Alvarelhos, a fortified settlement classified as a National Monument in 1910. During the Roman era, the Castro gained prominence due to its location along a key road linking Porto (Cale) and Braga (Bracara Augusta). This road remained a foundational element in the region's development over the centuries. The area was part of the lands of the madequisenses, an ethnic group whose territory spanned from the Atlantic Ocean to the Serra da Agrela mountain range and from the Leça to the Ave rivers.

The earliest known written reference to the area dates to 979, in a deed from the Monastery of Moreira in Maia. This document mentions Alvarelhos (alvarelios), São Cristóvão do Muro (sanctum christoforum), and Cedões (zadones), the latter located in Santiago de Bougado. By the 13th century, the region was part of the Terra da Maia, as documented in the inquiries of King Afonso III. This administrative structure persisted until 1384, when the territory was integrated into the jurisdiction of Porto.

In 1527, King Manuel I granted a foral (charter) to Maia, recognizing its administrative status and formalizing its privileges. Despite this recognition, the area remained largely rural, with its economy based on agriculture and small-scale crafts.

=== 19th and 20th centuries ===
The 19th century marked significant upheaval. During the Peninsular War in 1809, French forces under General Soult advanced through the region while marching toward Porto. Following the old Roman road, Soult's central column attempted to cross the Ave River at Barca da Trofa but encountered strong local resistance. Unable to proceed, the troops were forced to bypass the area, encountering further defenses at the barricaded Ponte da Lagoncinha. These events are commemorated in sites such as Barca da Trofa, Souto de Bairros, and Lantemil.

The liberal reforms of 1835 brought administrative changes. Queen Maria II established the judicial district of Santo Tirso, which included the eight parishes that now form Trofa: São Martinho de Bougado, Santiago de Bougado, Covelas, Muro, Alvarelhos, Guidões, São Romão do Coronado, and São Mamede do Coronado.

The late 19th century brought significant industrial and infrastructural development to the region. The construction of the Porto-Braga railway, the Guimarães railway, and new road networks spurred industrialization and reshaped the Ave Valley's economy. These changes marked the beginning of urbanization in Trofa, transitioning it from a predominantly rural area to an emerging industrial hub.

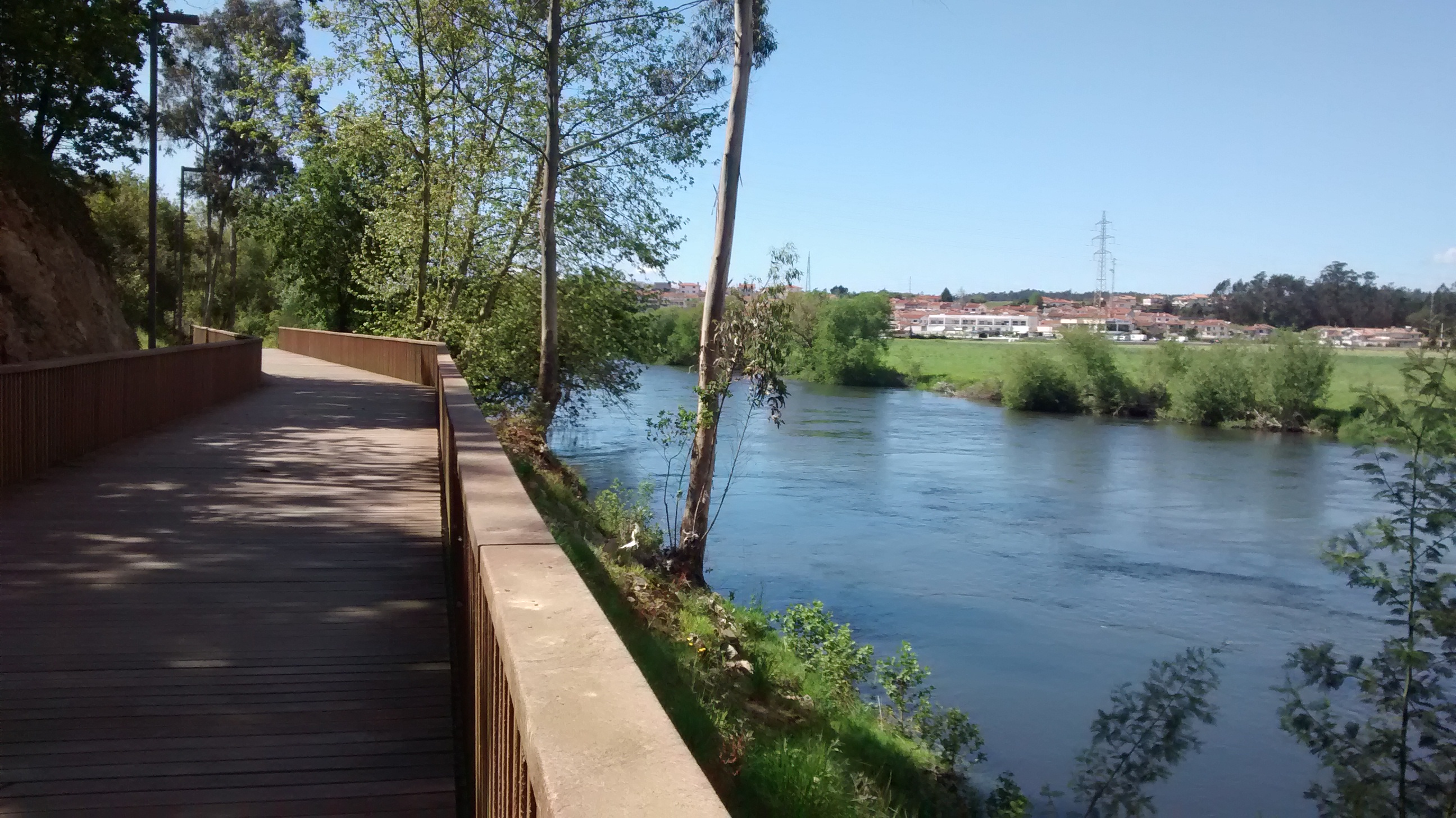
Ave river in Trofa in 2014

By the 20th century, Trofa had become a center for textile production, supported by the region's industrial growth. However, this rapid development came at an environmental cost. The Ave River and its tributaries suffered severe pollution, leading to the decline of aquatic ecosystems and the loss of traditional industries such as flax processing, hydraulic mills, and agriculture along the riverbanks. Recreational use of the river also dwindled, with local communities turning away from the degraded waterways.

Efforts to establish Trofa as an independent municipality began after the Carnation Revolution in 1974. Trofa was granted town status in 1984 and elevated to city status in 1993. On November 19, 1998, the Portuguese Parliament approved the creation of the Municipality of Trofa, which officially gained administrative autonomy in 1999.

== Parishes ==
Initially the municipality had eight parishes, but following the administrative changes in 2013, it was divided into five civil parishes (freguesias):

- Alvarelhos e Guidões
- Bougado (São Martinho e Santiago)
- Coronado (São Romão e São Mamede)
- Covelas
- Muro

== Demographics ==
Historical population
Year	Pop.	±%
2001	37,581	—
2011	38,999	+3.8%
2021	38,548	−1.2%
Source: INE

== Notable people ==
- Miguel Ângelo (born 1995), a footballer who plays as a defender
- Simão Azevedo (born 1995), known as Simãozinho, a footballer who plays as left winger
- Miguel Cardoso (born 1972), a football manager
- Sérgio Carneiro (born 1991), known as Serginho a footballer who played as a forward.
- Sofia Matos (born 1990), a politician of the centre-right party Social Democratic Party (PSD)
- João Pedro (born 1987), a footballer who played as a central defender
- Tiago Pereira (born 1975), known as Tiago, a former footballer with 631 club caps
- Nuno Santos (born 1995), a footballer who plays as a left winger
- André Viana (born 1992), a footballer who plays as a midfielder.
