= Emanuel de Azevedo =

Portuguese Jesuit and writer (1713–1796)

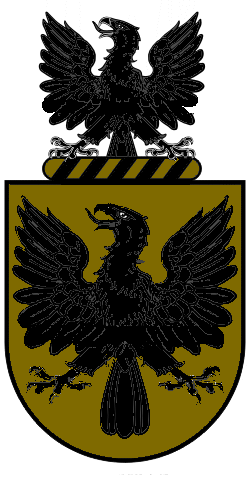
- Coat of arms of the Azevedo family, Lords of Paredes da Beira in Portugal
- Born: Manuel de Azevedo; December 25, 1713; Coimbra, Kingdom of Portugal
- Died: 2 April 1796 (aged 82); Piacenza, Italy
- Occupations: Jesuit, writer, Fidalgo
- Writing career
- Language: Portuguese, Latin, Italian
- Notable work: Vita del Taumaturgo Portoghese Sant’Antonio di Padova

Emanuel de Azevedo (Coimbra, December 25, 1713 – Piacenza, April 2, 1796), born Manuel de Azevedo, was a Portuguese fidalgo, Jesuit, writer and secretary of Pope Benedict XIV, whose works he edited. He was the author of various texts in Latin and Italian, including a biography of Saint Anthony of Padua that was widely disseminated in Italy at the end of the 18th century.

== Family background ==
He was born in Coimbra, on Christmas Eve 1713, son of José de Azevedo Vieira (born in São João da Pesqueira, Paredes da Beira, baptized on September 18, 1674, and died in Paredes da Beira, April 21, 1752), by his wife D. Luisa da Costa Rebelo da Fonseca (born in Paredes da Beira, on November 6, 1686, and died on January 7, 1743).

José de Azevedo Vieira was a magistrate (desembargador), a knight of the Military Order of Christ, and the 20th lord of the Manor House of the Azevedo family, in Paredes da Beira (also known as Casa da Torre das Pedras). He was also captain-major of the Ordenanças of the same town, of which he would later become the 1st lord.

On his father's side, Manuel de Azevedo descended from the lords of São João de Rei – thus being related to the co-founder of the Society of Jesus, Father Simão Rodrigues de Azevedo, and to the 16th century Jesuit martyr, Blessed Inácio de Azevedo.

On his mother's side, he descended from the Costas, known as the "Costas of Alpedrinha", whose first prominent character emerged in the 15th century, in the person of the renowned Portuguese cardinal Dom Jorge da Costa.

== Early life and education ==
His parents married on August 19, 1699, and he was the third of their seven children. As a child, he was educated by his paternal uncle, Sebastião Vieira da Silva, Prior of the church of Santa Justa in Coimbra, and he entered the novitiate of the Society of Jesus, in Coimbra, in 1728.

After the novitiate, he studied Humanities and philosophy, until 1736. From that year until 1739, he taught Latin, and then Rhetoric and Humanities at the Colégio de Santo Antão, in Lisbon, and finally Rhetoric at the University of Évora, until 1741. That same year, he began studying theology, but only for three months, because the General of the Society of Jesus, Franz Retz, called him to Rome, where he arrived in May 1742, to continue his theological studies.

== Period in Rome (1742 to 1754) ==
After completing his theological studies in 1746, he began a period of intense activity, during which, he edited the entire works of Pope Benedict XIV; he was also appointed consultant to the Congregation of Sacred Rites, and made a professor of the first chair of Liturgy at the Schola Sacrorum Rituum of the Roman College, and made a member of the Academies of Liturgy and Ecclesiastical History created by the same Pontiff.

In 1752, he would become widely known among liturgists in Rome with his creation of the so-called "Missal de Azevedo", the first volume of a collection of ancient liturgical texts, whose publication would be interrupted with his departure from Rome, two years later.

He was also the Royal Postulator for the canonization of Afonso Henriques, the first Portuguese monarch.

=== Privileges granted by the Pope ===
His closeness to Pope Benedict led the pontiff to grant several privileges to the chapel of the ancestral manor house of Manuel de Azevedo's family, in Paredes da Beira. On December 12, 1749, it was exempted from episcopal jurisdiction, making it directly subordinate to the Pope. This was an exceptional privilege that until then, in Portugal, had only been granted to the royal chapel.

During this period, King João V, who was a devout sovereign, entrusted Azevedo with several tasks, including as mentioned earlier, postulating the cause for the beatification of the first king of Portugal, and also that of organizing catalogs of relics of saints, to be printed in costly, luxury editions.

=== Lordship of Paredes da Beira ===
By a Royal Decree of April 8, 1750, signed by Joseph I, but still during the reign of João V (who was gravely ill), the Crown granted to the father of Manuel de Azevedo "all of the revenues that according to the Foral to the town of Paredes are paid to my Treasury, in order to be able to bind them perpetually as he sees fit, in satisfaction of all the services of the supplicant (...) and some other reasons that I am aware of, and by special grace and good reason".

At that time, the granting by the Portuguese crown of lordships in perpetuity and without restrictions concerning its rights of transmission – that is, no clause requiring that the succession be valid only for male heirs – was extremely rare. The decree from the crown did not specify the reasons behind such an extraordinary donation. It is speculated that the reason might have been due to the support provided by Manuel de Azevedo, due to his close personal relationship with the Pope, to King João V's desire to be awarded by the Holy See the title of Most Faithful Majesty—an objective that was only achieved on December 23, 1748, after long years of diplomatic démarches, which is only few months before the granting of the lordship of the town of Paredes to the father of Manuel de Azevedo.

== Forced departure from Rome (mid-1750s) ==
Under pressure from the new king's minister, Sebastião José de Carvalho, the future Marquis of Pombal, he was removed from Rome after 1754. The proximity between the Pope and Manuel de Azevedo, the influence he exercised in Rome, and his connection with the Portuguese Catholic movement known as A Jacobeia – an important sect, founded in Portugal in the 18th century that advocated a reform of the country's religious and moral life – turned Azevedo in the eyes of Sebastião José de Carvalho e Melo, into a political obstacle that needed to be set aside, so as not to harm the direct and exclusive access of the king's minister to the Head of the Holy See. Furthermore, many of Azevedo's enemies were now influential in Rome, namely among the Jesuits, who were for the most part opponents of the A Jacobeia's ideology.

The forced departure from Rome was an abrupt interruption of the activities he had carried out until then, including the publication of ancient liturgical texts and the teaching of the chair of Liturgy, which he had idealized and later organized. He did not return to Portugal, as he hoped to see the order that had removed him from Rome revoked, and he would never abandon his literary activity. He lived in several Italian cities and was in Fano in 1773, when the Society of Jesus, to which he belonged, was extinguished.

== Literary activities after the extinction of the Society of Jesus (1773) ==
The suppression of the Society of Jesus evoked strong emotions in Manuel de Azevedo, as in many other Jesuits of the time, who sometimes expressed their sadness through writings composed in Latin.

=== Latin verses ===
Azevedo composed a great deal of Latin verse during these unhappy years, including a four-book epic poem about the return of the Jesuits expelled from the American colonies of Spain and Portugal – and also a detailed description, in twelve books, of the city of Venice. He also wrote a collection of epistles, in Latin verse, entitled Epistolae ad heroas (published in Venice, 1781), loosely inspired by Ovid. In his Latin verses, Azevedo seeks to atone for his sadness at the suppression of the company, and even tries to comfort his Spanish, Portuguese and American colleagues – who now lived in exile, in the Papal States and also in Russia under Catherine the Great.

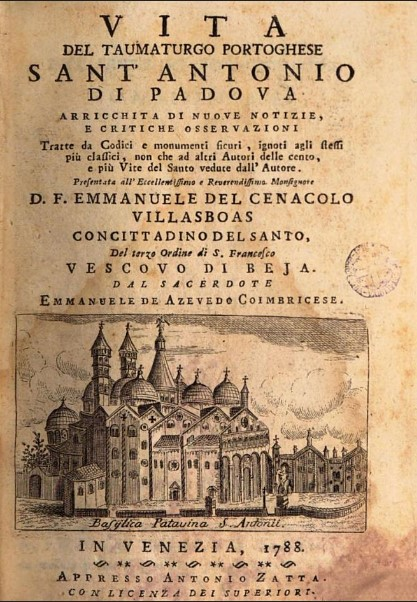
The biography of Saint Anthony, written in Italian by Emanuel de Azevedo, in its 1st edition, published in Venice, in 1788

=== Biography of Saint Anthony (1778) ===
In 1778 in Venice, Azevedo published Vita del Taumaturgo Portoghese Sant'Antonio di Padova, which at the time was considered the best biography of the Portuguese saint. It was a commercial success, with several reissues (the 1st edition came out in 1788, the 2nd in 1789, the 3rd in 1793, and the 4th in 1818), in addition to several translations, including into Spanish, Portuguese, and – partially – Polish.

Literary and linguistic skills were a tradition in earlier generations of Manuel de Azevedo's family, namely in the case of his great-aunt, the playwright Ângela de Azevedo, author of three plays in Spanish – and one of only six women who are known to have written and published in Castilian, in the Iberian Peninsula of the 17th century. One of Manuel's brothers, Dom Joaquim de Azevedo, (who was known as Frei Joaquim da Encarnação, as a Crosier friar), wrote – towards the end of the 18th century – an Ecclesiastical History of the city and bishopric of Lamego, which would be published in 1877.

Also, when the future Tsar Paul I of Russia and his wife, the would be Tsarina Maria Feodorovna (Sophia Dorothea of Württemberg) visited Venice in early 1782, Manuel de Azevedo personally presented them with two volumes of his poetry, dedicated to Catherine the Great and the Russian princes.

== Death and succession (1796) ==
Manuel de Azevedo died in Italy, in Piacenza, on April 2, 1796.

All of his brothers had followed religious careers and thus left no issue.

The succession to the manor house and chapel of Torre das Pedras, on the Estate of Azevedo (also known as the estate of Corredoura), and to the Lordship of Paredes da Beira, passed to Manuel's sister, Dona Maria Clara Francisca Joaquina de Azevedo e Távora. She married her cousin Manuel de Sousa e Azevedo, Alcaide (constable) of Seia, and their descendants – who would use the surnames Lemos de Azevedo, and later Castro Lemos (of the counts of Côvo) and Sousa Pinto – remained in possession of the lordship of Paredes until 1834 (when all the territorial lordships were extinguished in Portugal) and of the manor house and chapel of the Azevedo estate, until the present day.
