= Sebastián Acevedo =

Chilean self-immolator (1933–1983)

- Born: January 20, 1933
- Died: November 11, 1983 (aged 50); Concepción, Biobío Region, Chile
- Cause of death: Self-immolation
- Children: María Candelaria Acevedo

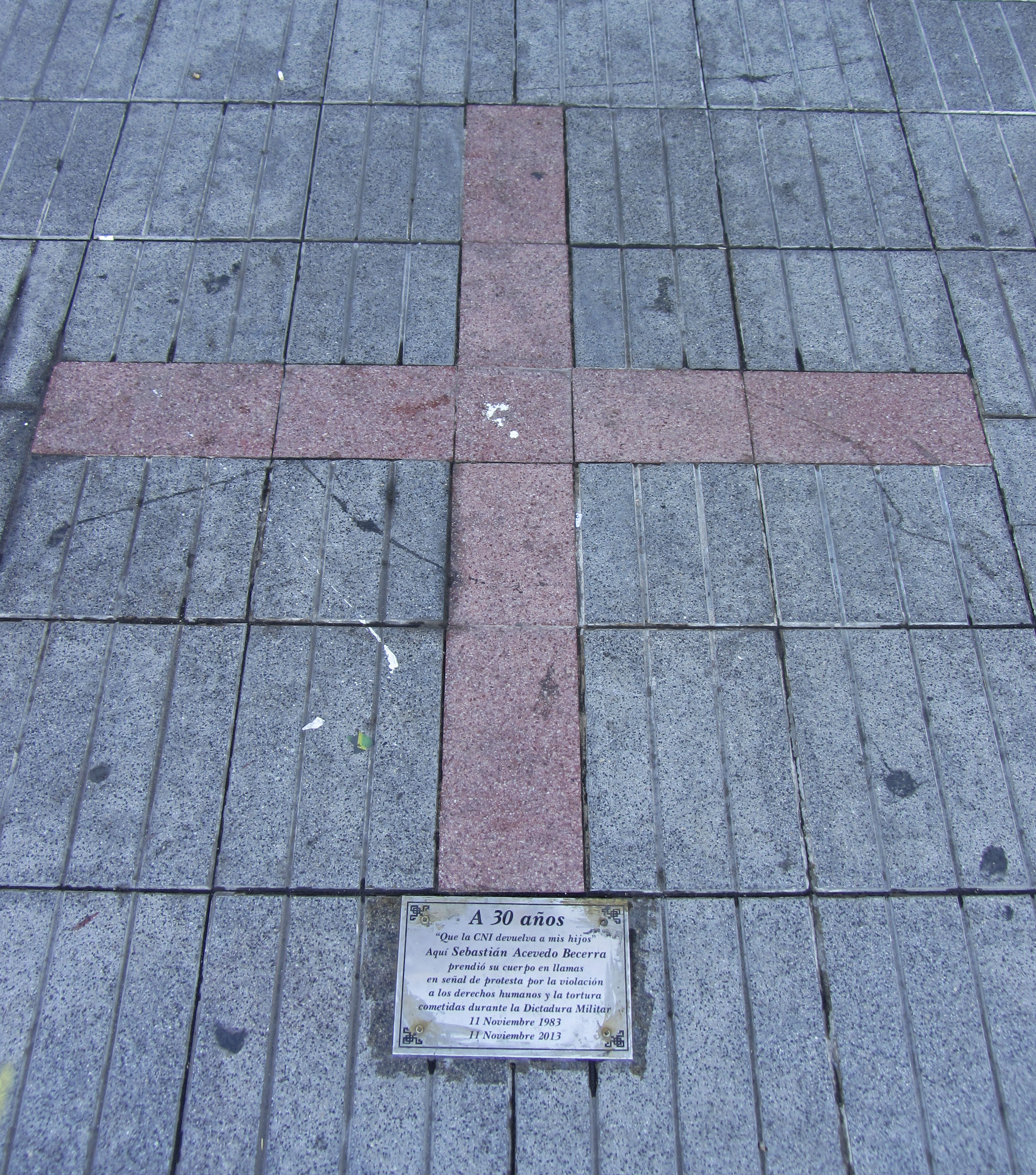
Cross and plaque of Sebastián Acevedo at the entrance of the Cathedral of the Most Holy Conception.

Sebastián Acevedo Becerra (20 January 1933 – 11 November 1983) was a Chilean worker who, in protest at the arrest of his children by the secret police of the Augusto Pinochet dictatorship, immolated himself in front of the Cathedral of the Most Holy Conception, in the town of Concepción.

On 9 November 1983, Galo and María Candelaria Acevedo, two of Sebastián's children, were arrested by armed civilians who did not identify themselves. He searched for them in different precincts, suspecting that they were being held by the National Information Center.

Two days later, on 11 November, after he was unable to establish their whereabouts, he sprayed gasoline and kerosene on his clothes at the Plaza de Armas in Concepción as a sign of protest to pressure the authorities. When a rifleman tried to stop him, he set fire to his clothes. He died a few hours later as a result of the burns. Before he died, he received the last rites from Enrique Moreno who recorded his last words on a tape recorder: "I want the CNI to return my children... Lord, forgive them and also forgive me for this sacrifice".

Acevedo's daughter María Candelaria Acevedo was elected to the Chamber of Deputies of Chile in the 2021 general election.
