= María Candelaria Acevedo =

Chilean politician

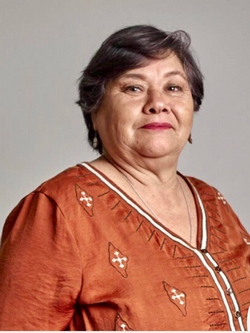

Member of the Chamber of Deputies
- In office 11 March 2022 – 11 March 2026
- Constituency: District 20

Personal details
- Born: 12 September 1958 (age 68) Coronel, Chile
- Party: Communist Party (PC)
- Spouse: José Luis Sepúlveda
- Children: 1
- Parent(s): Sebastián Acevedo; Elena Sáez
- Occupation: Activist; Politician

María Candelaria Acevedo Sáez (born 12 September 1958) is a Chilean politician from the Communist Party of Chile. She is the daughter of Sebastián Acevedo, who set himself on fire in November 1983.

== Biography ==
She was born in Coronel on 12 September 1958. She is the daughter of Sebastián Acevedo Becerra, a member of the Communist Party of Chile, and Elena del Carmen Sáez Retamal. After his daughter María Candelaria and his son Galo were detained by agents of the Chilean civic–military dictatorship, Sebastián Acevedo set himself on fire in front of the Cathedral of Concepción demanding their immediate release.

Her grandfather Vicente Acevedo Yáñez and his wife Ana Aguilera Botros were members of the Communist Party and victims of political repression during the government of Gabriel González Videla. Ana Aguilera was elected as a councillor of Coronel in the 1947 municipal election, and her grandfather also served as a councillor of Coronel.

She is married to José Luis Sepúlveda Barra and is the mother of one son and one daughter.

She completed the 7th and 8th grades of primary education at Escuela Clorinda Avello in Santa Juana (Concepción Province). She attended secondary education at Liceo A-49 in Coronel and at Liceo de Niñas de Concepción, completing her studies at the FUNDAC Adult Education Center in Concepción. At the time of her detention, she was studying accounting.

In her working life, she has carried out various occupations, including unpaid care work.

== Political career ==
She began her political involvement in 1971 as a member of the Youth Wing of the Communist Party. After the 1973 coup d’état, she carried out clandestine resistance activities against the military dictatorship as an organizational officer of the El Carbón Regional Committee, covering the areas of Lota and Coronel.

On 9 November 1983, she was detained in Coronel by agents of the National Intelligence Center (CNI) and taken to an Army detention and torture facility near Playa Blanca, where she was subjected to torture and cruel, inhuman, and degrading treatment. She was released on 11 November following the self-immolation of her father and was later detained again between 30 November 1983 and 8 February 1985.

Following her father’s death, she focused her work on the defense of human rights, the recovery of historical memory, and community organizing. She served as president of the Sebastián Acevedo Human Rights Corporation and as Secretary General of the Association of Relatives of Political Prisoners (Concepción), as well as a leader of the Regional Corporation for Memory and Human Rights of Concepción.

She also carried out grassroots community work, serving as president of the Nueva Esperanza Neighbourhood Association in Coronel, and participated in various electoral campaigns of her party. She ran unsuccessfully for councillor in Coronel in 1996 and in Negrete in 2000.

In November 2004, she was officially recognized by the National Commission on Political Imprisonment and Torture as a victim of political imprisonment and torture under the civic–military dictatorship. That same year, she ran unsuccessfully for mayor of Chiguayante.

In 2021, she ran unsuccessfully for the Constitutional Convention for the 20th District of the Biobío Region. Later that year, she was elected to the Chamber of Deputies of Chile representing the Communist Party within the Apruebo Dignidad pact for the same district, obtaining 7,016 votes (2.02%).

She ran for re-election in the elections of 16 November 2025 within the Unidad por Chile pact but was not elected.
