= Fernando (footballer, born 1981) =

Brazilian footballer

Personal information
- Full name: Fernando Domingos de Moura
- Date of birth: 16 April 1981 (age 45)
- Place of birth: Guarujá, Brazil
- Height: 1.77 m (5 ft 9 1/2 in)
- Position: Forward

Senior career*
Years	Team	Apps	(Gls)
2001–2003	Grêmio Inhumense		
2003–2004	Varzim	14	(0)
2004–2005	Moreirense	26	(5)
2005–2006	Académica	14	(1)
2006–2008	Belenenses	29	(1)
2008	Marília	6	(0)
2009	Portuguesa-SP		
2009–2010	Moreirense	12	(3)
Total		101	(10)
- * Club domestic league appearances and goals

Fernando Domingos de Moura (born 16 April 1981 in Guarujá, São Paulo), known simply as Fernando, is a Brazilian retired footballer who played as a forward.
