= Dagil =

Brazilian footballer (born 1979)

Personal information
- Full name: Adagilton dos Santos
- Date of birth: 17 July 1979 (age 47)
- Place of birth: Nossa Senhora das Dores, Brazil
- Height: 1.83 m (6 ft 0 in)
- Position: Striker

Team information
- Current team: Carpintaria pica pau e liga dos belgas

Senior career*
Years	Team	Apps	(Gls)
2000–2003	Dorense		
2003–2005	Confiança		
2005–2006	Amadense		
2006	Itabaiana		
2006–2007	Ribeirão	26	(13)
2007–2008	Estoril	41	(12)
2009	Trofense	10	(0)
2009	Covilhã	12	(1)
2010	Gil Vicente	12	(0)
2010–2011	Gondomar	26	(11)
2012–2013	Guarany-SE		
2016–2018	Dorense	34	(12)
2020-	Carpintaria pica pau	00	(00)
2021-	Liga dos belgas	00	(00)
- * Club domestic league appearances and goals

Adagilton dos Santos (born 17 July 1979), known as Dagil, is a Brazilian footballer who plays for Dorense Futebol Clube in the Campeonato Sergipano as a striker.
