= Diogo Melo =

Brazilian footballer (born 1984)

Personal information
- Full name: Diogo Jefferson Mendes de Melo
- Date of birth: 18 April 1984 (age 42)
- Place of birth: Uniao dos Palmares, Brazil
- Height: 1.82 m (6 ft 0 in)
- Position: Midfielder

Youth career
- 2004: Rio Branco

Senior career*
Years	Team	Apps	(Gls)
2005–2006	Cruzeiro	7	(0)
2007	Marília	0	(0)
2007–2010	Portimonense	79	(7)
2010–2012	Académica	46	(2)
2012	Sanat Naft	12	(0)
2013	União Barbarense	5	(0)
2013	Ermis Aradippou	5	(0)
2014	Portimonense	11	(0)
2014–2015	Olhanense	32	(0)
2015–2016	Penafiel	14	(0)
2016–2017	Farense	26	(0)
2017	Águeda	12	(0)
2018	Almancilense	15	(0)
2018–2019	Armacenenses	25	(1)
- * Club domestic league appearances and goals

Diogo Jefferson Mendes de Melo commonly known as Diogo Melo (born 18 April 1984) is a Brazilian former footballer who played as a midfielder.

== Honours ==
Académica de Coimbra

- Taça de Portugal: 2011–12
