= Luís de Azevedo =

Luís de Azevedo (born at Carrazedo de Montenegro, in the Diocese of Braga, in Portugal, in 1573; died in Ethiopia in 1634) was a Portuguese Jesuit scholar and missionary.

== Life ==
He became a Jesuit in 1588, and sailed for the East Indies in 1592. In 1605 he began his missionary work in Ethiopia, where he remained until his death. Azevedo was called the Apostle Agarus.

== Works ==
He translated into Chaldaic the commentaries of Francisco de Toledo on the Epistles of St. Paul to the Romans and those of Francisco Ribera on the Epistle of St. Paul to the Hebrews; the Canonical Hours, the Office of the Blessed Virgin Mary, and other works. He is the author of a grammar of the Ethiopic language, and translated into the same tongue the New Testament, a Portuguese catechism, instructions on the Apostles' Creed, and other books of the same nature. Azevedo concentrated on the Ge'ez language, rather than Amharic, since Ge'ez was the language of literacy.
