= Lagoncinha Bridge =

Lagoncinha Bridge Ponte de Lagoncinha
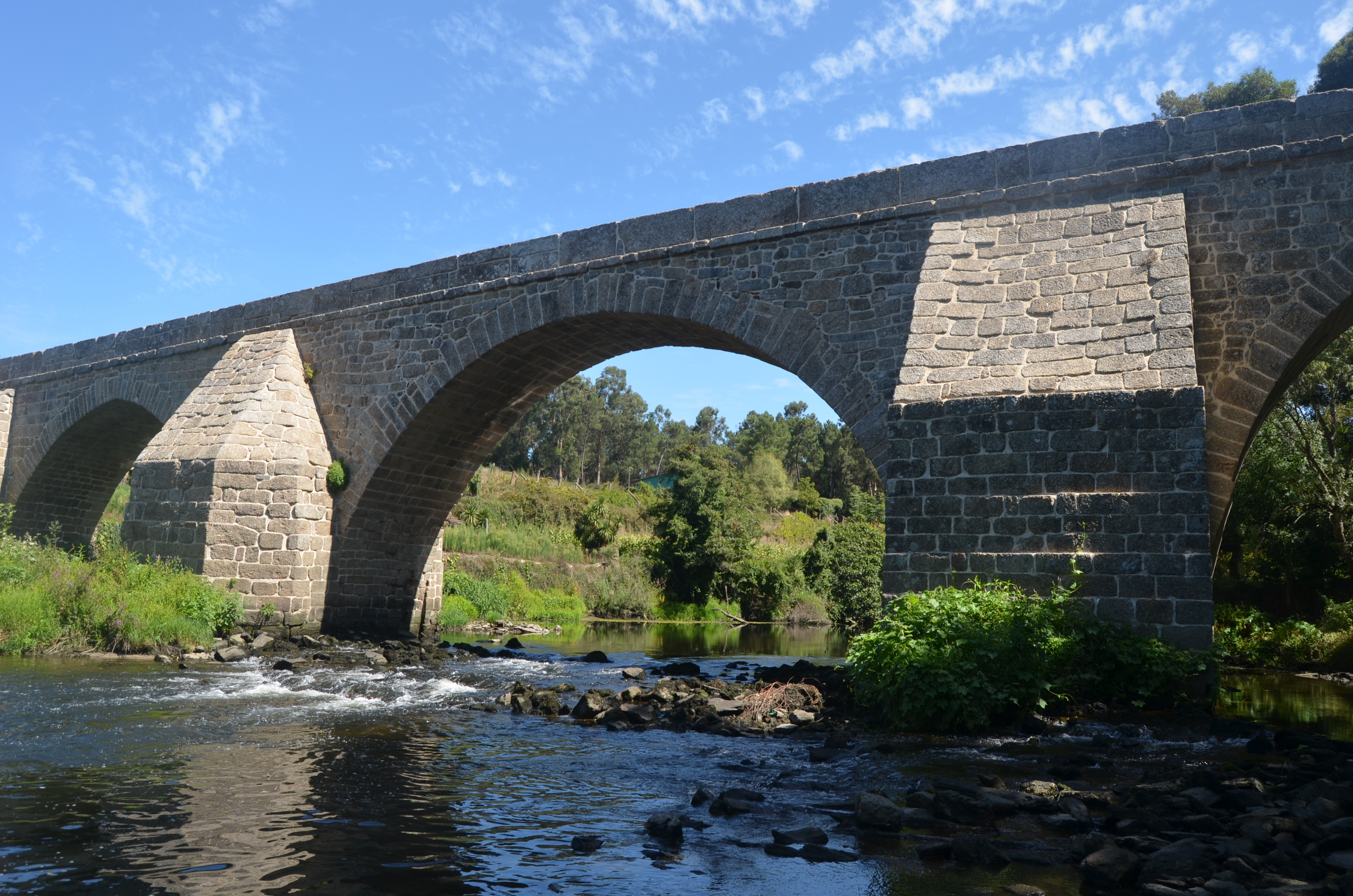
- Coordinates: 41°20′56″N 8°31′12″W
- Locale: Braga District, Portugal

Lagoncinha Bridge is a medieval bridge crossing the Ave River in Lousado, Vila Nova de Famalicão, in Portugal. The bridge was classified as a National Monument in 1943.

== Characteristics ==
The bridge features six uneven arches with cutwaters. It is possibly a reconstruction of a pre-existing Roman bridge, with characteristics attributable to the Late Middle Ages and similarities to many other bridges built in Northern Portugal during the XIII century.

The bridge was subject to studies performed by investigators from the University of Porto, at the behest of Direção-Geral dos Edifícios e Monumentos Nacionais. It was found that the structure was in risk due to heavy traffic. In 2018, the bridge underwent major renovation works that cut traffic for five months.

== See also ==
- List of bridges in Portugal

== Sources ==
- Arêde, António; Costa, Aníbal (October 2002). Inspecção e diagnóstico estrutural de construções históricas. Algumas contribuições da FEUP (pdf). A Intervenção no Património. Práticas de Conservação e Reabilitação. (in Portuguese). University of Porto.
- Barroca, Mário Jorge (2006). "A Cruz do Lugar das Marcas (Lousado, Vila Nova de Famalicão) e o Couto do Mosteiro de Santo Tirso" (PDF). Estudos em homenagem ao Professor Doutor José Marques (in Portuguese). Vol. 4. University of Porto. pp. 137–160.
