= Carrazedo de Montenegro e Curros =

- Civil parish
- Location in Portugal
- Coordinates: 41.565°N 7.429°W
- Country: Portugal
- Region: Norte
- Intermunic. comm.: Alto Tâmega
- District: Vila Real
- Municipality: Valpaços

Area
  - Total: 49.83 km^{2} (19.24 sq mi)

Population (2011)
  - Total: 1,780
  - Density: 36/km^{2} (93/sq mi)
- Time zone: UTC+00:00 (WET)
  - Summer (DST): UTC+01:00 (WEST)

Carrazedo de Montenegro e Curros is a civil parish in the municipality of Valpaços, Portugal. It was formed in 2013 by the merger of the former parishes Carrazedo de Montenegro and Curros. The population in 2011 was 1,780, in an area of 49.83 km^{2}.
