= Bruno Severino =

Portuguese footballer

Personal information
- Full name: Bruno Nogueira Severino
- Date of birth: 11 March 1986 (age 40)
- Place of birth: Barreiro, Portugal
- Height: 1.70 m (5 ft 7 in)
- Position: Forward

Team information
- Current team: Barreirense
- Number: 7

Senior career*
Years	Team	Apps	(Gls)
2004–2007	Barreirense		
2007–2008	Gondomar	16	(9)
2008–2012	Vitória de Setúbal	26	(1)
2008–2009	→ Gondomar (loan)	25	(11)
2009	→ Beira-Mar (loan)	4	(1)
2010	→ Desportivo das Aves (loan)	13	(0)
2010–2011	→ Sporting Covilhã (loan)	25	(2)
2012–2013	Torreense	12	(1)
2013–2014	Pinhalnovense	16	(4)
2014	Moura	10	(3)
2014–2016	Pinhalnovense	44	(14)
2016–	Barreirense	20	(4)
- * Club domestic league appearances and goals as of 15 April 2017

Bruno Nogueira Severino (born 11 March 1986) is a Portuguese footballer who plays for Barreirense. He is a forward.

== Club career ==
He made his professional debut in the Segunda Liga for Barreirense on 27 November 2005 in a game against Feirense.

He made his Primeira Liga debut for Vitória de Setúbal on 4 February 2008 in a game against Naval. He came on as a half-time substitute and scored on his debut in a 1–2 loss. In 2009, he was on loan to Beira-Mar.
