= Chico (footballer, born 1981) =

Portuguese footballer

Personal information
- Full name: Francisco José Castro Fernandes
- Date of birth: 18 September 1981 (age 45)
- Place of birth: Famalicão, Portugal
- Height: 1.84 m (6 ft 1/2 in)
- Position: Striker

Youth career
- 1992–1993: Famalicão
- 1993–1995: Porto
- 1995–2000: Famalicão

Senior career*
Years	Team	Apps	(Gls)
2000	Famalicão	4	(1)
2000–2001	Limianos		
2001–2005	Cabeceirense		
2005–2007	Trofense	51	(14)
2007	Varzim	15	(4)
2008–2010	Farul Constanţa	64	(18)
2010–2011	Trofense	11	(1)
2011–2012	Chaves	24	(9)
2012–2013	Famalicão	24	(11)
2013–2014	Ribeirão	11	(1)
2014–2017	Famalicão	75	(9)
Total		279	(68)
- * Club domestic league appearances and goals

Francisco José Castro Fernandes (born 18 September 1981), commonly known as Chico, is a Portuguese former footballer who played as a striker.

== Club career ==
Chico was born in Vila Nova de Famalicão, Braga District. In a career mainly associated with F.C. Famalicão, he appeared in 103 Segunda Liga matches and scored 14 goals over five seasons. Professionally, he also competed in Romania.
