= Ricardo Chaves =

Portuguese footballer

Personal information
- Full name: Ricardo Alberto Medeiros Chaves
- Date of birth: 27 October 1977 (age 49)
- Place of birth: Valpaços, Portugal
- Height: 1.80 m (5 ft 11 in)
- Position: Midfielder

Youth career
- 1988–1996: Valpaços
- 1996–1997: Chaves

Senior career*
Years	Team	Apps	(Gls)
1997–1998	Vila Pouca		
1998–2004	Chaves	132	(16)
2004–2006	Vitória Setúbal	62	(5)
2006–2007	Braga	14	(1)
2007–2009	Vitória Setúbal	58	(4)
2009–2011	Rio Ave	31	(1)
2011–2012	Aves	17	(0)
2012–2015	Chaves	63	(3)
2015–2016	Mirandela	5	(0)
Total		382	(30)

Managerial career
- 2015: Chaves (assistant)
- 2015–2016: Mirandela (assistant)
- 2017: Mirandela
- * Club domestic league appearances and goals

Ricardo Alberto Medeiros Chaves (born 27 October 1977) is a Portuguese retired footballer who played as a central midfielder, and is a manager.

== Club career ==
Born in Valpaços, Vila Real District, Chaves started playing for local club Vila Pouca FC. He went on to represent neighbouring G.D. Chaves (two games in the Primeira Liga in the 1998–99 season, his first as a professional, plus five years in the second division), Vitória de Setúbal and S.C. Braga.

In 2008, while at Setúbal for the second time in his career, Chaves won the inaugural edition of the Portuguese League Cup, in a penalty shootout win against Sporting CP. He played the full 120 minutes in the final.

Chaves moved to Rio Ave F.C. in late June 2009, after being instrumental in Setúbal's consecutive narrow top-flight relegation escapes – he only missed two league matches in his two seasons. After being regularly used during his tenure, the 33-year-old returned to the second level and signed with C.D. Aves.

== Honours ==
Vitória de Setúbal

- Taça de Portugal: 2004–05
- Taça da Liga: 2007–08
