= Leandro Branco =

Brazilian footballer (born 1983)

Personal information
- Full name: Leandro dos Santos Branco
- Date of birth: 2 June 1983 (age 43)
- Place of birth: Lages, Brazil
- Height: 1.78 m (5 ft 10 in)
- Position: Forward

Senior career*
Years	Team	Apps	(Gls)
2002	Chapecoense		
2003	Marcílio Dias	?	(31)
2004	Hermann Aichinger	14	(11)
2005	Inter de Lages		
2006	Audax Italiano	0	(0)
2006	Ituano	5	(0)
2007	Juventus-SC	14	(9)
2007–2009	Vitória Setúbal	31	(0)
2009–2010	Criciúma	?	(7)
2010	Metropolitano	1	(0)
2010–2011	Marcílio Dias	13	(2)
2011	Confiança	4	(1)
2011	Atlético Tubarão	4	(1)
2012	Brasil Farroupilha		
2012	Atlético Tubarão	?	(4)
2013	Marcílio Dias	3	(0)
2013–2014	Águia Negra	10	(6)
2014	Inter de Lages	16	(0)
2015	Águia Negra	10	(2)
2015	Comercial-MS	3	(0)
2016	Águia Negra	12	(0)
2016	Operário Mafra	12	(0)
2017	Águia Negra	11	(4)
2017	Sete de Dourados	5	(1)
2018	Águia Negra	9	(4)
- * Club domestic league appearances and goals

Leandro dos Santos Branco (born 2 June 1983) is a Brazilian former professional footballer who played as a forward.

== Career ==
Branco was born in Lages, Santa Catarina. After spending most of his career with modest clubs in his country, Branco had a brief stint with Chilean club Audax Italiano in 2006 and moved in 2007–08 to Portugal, signing with Vitória de Setúbal. His stint with the Sado River side proved a nightmare, as he failed to score a single Primeira Liga goal in two seasons combined, also receiving his marching orders in a 2–1 away loss against Belenenses on 11 April 2009; he netted twice in official games during his stint, one in the Portuguese Cup and another in the domestic League Cup, with his team winning the latter competition.

In the 2009 summer, Branco returned to his country, signing with Criciúma. The following year he switched to Metropolitano, and continued playing at that level in the subsequent campaigns, representing for example Marcílio Dias and Tubarão in several stints.

In May 2017, Branco joined Sete de Dourados.

== Honours ==
Vitória de Setúbal

- Taça da Liga: 2007–08
