= Heslley Couto =

Brazilian footballer (born 1983)

Personal information
- Full name: Heslley Jader Couto Ferreira
- Date of birth: 6 July 1983 (age 43)
- Place of birth: Formoso, Brazil
- Height: 1.84 m (6 ft 1/2 in)
- Position: Centre-back

Senior career*
Years	Team	Apps	(Gls)
2002	Campinas		
2003	Portuguesa		
2004	Campinas		
2005	Inter de Limeira		
2006	Portuguesa		
2007	Estrela do Norte		
2007–2008	Freamunde	24	(1)
2008–2009	Portimonense	15	(0)
2009–2012	Chaves	36	(0)
2012–2013	Águila	0	(0)
- * Club domestic league appearances and goals

Heslley Jader Couto Ferreira (born 6 July 1983) is a former Brazilian footballer.
