= Erik d'Azevedo =

- Born: 1948 (age 77–78); Oakland, California
- Education: California College of the Arts, Oakland
- Years active: 1970s–2000s
- Known for: Painting, Poetry
- Movement: Post-War California, Bay Area Abstract Expressionism

Erik d'Azevedo (born 1948) is an American artist and poet who has been active in the San Francisco Bay Area art scene since the late 1970s.

== Early life ==
D'Azevedo was born in Oakland, California. His father, Warren, was an anthropologist and academic who founded the anthropology department at the University of Nevada, Reno. During his lifetime, Warren was acknowledged as a pioneer of the study of African art, particularly with his groundbreaking book, The Traditional Artist in African Societies (Indiana University Press, 1974). His mother, Kathleen, is a retired anthropologist whose scholarship focuses primarily on child psychology. When he was six years old, d'Azevedo traveled with his parents and sister to Liberia to live among the Gola people as his father conducted fieldwork for his dissertation. This experience, in addition to his father's ethnographic work on Native American Washoe culture of the Great Basin, had a profound impact on the development of Erik's worldview.

== Education ==
D'Azevedo initially attended the University of Nevada, Reno majoring in social sciences, although during this time he took a few art courses, notably with sculptor John McCracken, who encouraged him to leave Nevada for an art center like New York, Los Angeles, or San Francisco. While in Reno in the mid-1960s, he worked as a field crew member for archeological surveys in eastern Nevada.

Following McCracken's advise, he returned to the Bay Area and went on to receive a Bachelor of Fine Art degree from the California College of Arts and Craft (now California College of the Arts) in 1974, and remained at the school for graduate studies, receiving a Master of Fine Art degree in 1976. At CCAC, he studied with leading Bay Area artists such as Franklin Williams, Judith Linhares, Roy De Forest, Arthur Okamura and Jay DeFeo, whose emphasis on resisting "the hierarchy of material," resonated with him. He studied privately with DeFeo after leaving CCAC.

== Artistic style and career ==
Early on in his career, d'Azevedo sought to break with the conventions of abstract painting in Western art by focusing on "process painting," which encourages mindfulness and experimentation in place of traditional formalism. This approach allows for elements to develop organically, and has led to what he describes as "purposeful chaos", which references the theory established by art critic Morse Peckham in his 1965 book Man's Rage for Chaos. Peckham writes in opposition to the commonly held notion that artists seek to create structure. Expanding this idea, d'Azevedo believes that "chaos" is a direct reaction to the "rigidity and structure" of art history and its discourse. Reflecting on his own work in a 2004 interview, he notes that although his abstract painting might seem like visual chaos, it is in fact created with a sense of order.

Experimentation is central to his work, leading him to use of a variety of media. His works range from paintings and sculptures that incorporate found objects to oil and acrylic paintings on canvas. Working with an emphasis on the spontaneity of "process," he eventually arrived at a painting technique that resembles printmaking, as he first paints an image on polyurethane then transfers it in reverse to a stretched canvas. D'Azevedo refers to this technique as "blind painting" or an "indirect" method.

When asked about the possible influence of African art and visual culture on his work as a result of his early exposure to it as a child, he has said "If that influence is there, it comes out completely unconsciously". D'Azevedo has lived and worked in the East Bay for decades, maintaining studios in Emeryville, Berkeley, and Oakland from the mid-1970s until the early 2000s. He has exhibited in museums, galleries, and alternative art spaces since 1972, while he was still a student at the University of Nevada, Reno.

=== Notable exhibitions ===
- University of Nevada, Reno, Sheppard Gallery, 1972 (Solo show)
- Center Gallery, Reno, Nevada, 1972 (Group show)
- Center Gallery, Reno, Nevada, 1973 (Solo show)
- University of Nevada, Reno, Sheppard Gallery, 1973 (Group show)
- "Surface and Image", Walnut Creek Civic Arts Center, 1976, curated by Phil Linhares
- "Exhibition 86", Berkeley Art Center, 1986, juried by Peter Selz and Stephen Wirtz
- "Small Works", California Museum of Art, Santa Rosa (1996)
- "Far Out", University of Nevada, Reno, Department of Art (2012)

=== Public Collections ===
- University of Nevada, Reno Department of Art
- Oakland Museum of California
- Farhat Art Museum, Beirut, Lebanon

=== Awards and teaching ===
In 1992, d'Azevedo received a National Endowment for the Arts fellowship, and was later awarded a Pollock-Krasner Foundation grant (2000).

He taught painting at the San Francisco Art Institute in 2000, and was a guest lecturer in the literature department of St. Mary's College in Moraga, California earlier that year.

== Writing ==
D'Azevedo was active in the Bay Area poetry scene beginning in 1984. His poems and short stories have been featured in Ellensburg Anthology (New York) and Perspectives (New York), in addition to smaller California publications. Between 1984 and 1992, he published five volumes of poetry including The Berkeley Diet (1983), Garageland: Poems 1978 - 1984 (Jaws on a Spring Press, 1984), and Poems to Go (Jaws on a Spring Press, 1984).

In 2012, he published a memoir of his childhood years in Liberia titled "Vanya Da Dua" Glimpses of a Lost World: An American Boy in the Liberian Bush (CreateSpace Independent Publishing Platform).
