= Marcão (footballer, born 1976) =

Brazilian footballer

Personal information
- Full name: Marcos Aurélio Titon
- Date of birth: July 19, 1976 (age 50)
- Place of birth: Dois Vizinhos, Brazil
- Height: 1.88 m (6 ft 2 in)
- Position: Defender

Senior career*
Years	Team	Apps	(Gls)
2001–2003	Ermesinde S.C.	56	(3)
2003–2009	S.C. Freamunde	142	(10)
2009–2015	FC Jeunesse Canach		
- * Club domestic league appearances and goals as of 02:25, 10 January 2017 (UTC)

Marcos Aurélio Titon (born 19 July 1976), known as Marcão, is a retired Brazilian footballer who last played as a defender and midfielder for Luxembourg National Division club FC Jeunesse Canach.
