= Hélder Guedes =

Portuguese footballer

Personal information
- Full name: Hélder Tiago Pinto Moura Guedes
- Date of birth: 7 May 1987 (age 39)
- Place of birth: Penafiel, Portugal
- Height: 1.84 m (6 ft 0 in)
- Position: Forward

Youth career
- 1995–2006: Penafiel

Senior career*
| Years | Team | Apps | (Gls) |
| 2005–2015 | Penafiel | 190 | (27) |
| 2008–2009 | → Paços Ferreira (loan) | 1 | (0) |
| 2015–2018 | Rio Ave | 89 | (24) |
| 2018 | Al Dhafra | 2 | (0) |
| 2019–2020 | Vitória Setúbal | 19 | (4) |
| 2020–2021 | Chaves | 19 | (0) |
| Total | | 320 | (55) |

International career
| 2007 | Portugal U20 | 12 | (2) |
| 2008 | Portugal U21 | 2 | (0) |
- * Club domestic league appearances and goals

Hélder Tiago Pinto Moura Guedes (born 7 May 1987) is a Portuguese former professional footballer who played as a forward.

== Club career ==
=== Penafiel ===
Born in Penafiel, Guedes played most of his career with hometown's F.C. Penafiel, mostly in the Segunda Liga. In 2008–09 he was loaned to F.C. Paços de Ferreira of the Primeira Liga, but his input during the season consisted of one match (30 minutes).

Guedes scored eight goals in 38 games in 2013–14, as Penafiel returned to the top division after a lengthy absence. He repeated the feat the following campaign (in seven appearances less), with the club being immediately relegated.

=== Rio Ave ===
On 29 June 2015, Guedes signed a three-year contract with Rio Ave FC. He scored on his competitive debut for his new team, coming on as a 70th-minute substitute in a 3–3 away draw against C.F. Os Belenenses on 15 August.

Guedes netted ten times in 2017–18, helping to a sixth-place finish and qualification for the second qualifying round of the UEFA Europa League.

=== Vitória Setúbal ===
Guedes joined Vitória F.C. on a two-year deal in the summer of 2019, after half a season in the UAE Pro League with Al Dhafra FC.

== International career ==
Guedes represented Portugal at the 2007 FIFA U-20 World Cup. He won the first of his two caps at under-21 level on 5 February 2008, playing 15 minutes and being booked in the 2–1 win over Scotland in the Vale do Tejo International Tournament.

== Personal life ==
Guedes' father, José, was also a footballer and a forward. In an 11-year career, he amassed top-division totals of 63 matches and eight goals in representation of four teams. He died on 16 April 1997 (along with 12 others) at the age of 34 following an incident where the Meia Culpa night club was set on fire, the arson being orchestrated by the owner of a rival establishment.
