= Hermes Júnior =

Brazilian footballer (born 1978)

Personal information
- Full name: Hermes Rodrigues Júnior
- Date of birth: 6 January 1978 (age 48)
- Place of birth: Nova Iguaçu, Brazil
- Height: 1.86 m (6 ft 1 in)
- Position: Forward

Team information
- Current team: Olaria (head coach)

Youth career
- 1996–1997: Flamengo

Senior career*
Years	Team	Apps	(Gls)
1998–2000	Madureira		
2000–2004	Covilhã	113	(28)
2004–2005	Marco	32	(15)
2005–2006	Santa Clara	16	(2)
2006–2007	União da Madeira	25	(21)
2007–2009	Gil Vicente	52	(15)
2009–2010	Trofense	10	(1)

Managerial career
- 2017–2018: Boavista U20
- 2018: Artsul
- 2019–2020: Nova Iguaçu U20
- 2020: Nova Iguaçu
- 2021: Serrano
- 2022: America-RJ
- 2023: Castanhal
- 2023: Belford Roxo
- 2024–2025: Nova Iguaçu U20
- 2025: Americano
- 2025: Duque de Caxias
- 2026–: Olaria
- * Club domestic league appearances and goals

Hermes Rodrigues Júnior (born 6 January 1978) is a Brazilian football coach and former player who played as a forward. He is the current head coach of Olaria.

== Career ==
Hermes Júnior played for clubs in Brazil and Portugal. At the end of his playing career, he signed a two-year contract with Gil Vicente.

After he retired from playing football, Hermes Junior became a football coach. He led Nova Iguaçu to the Campeonato Carioca Serie B1 title in 2021. Hermes Junior managed America-RJ and Serrano in the Campeonato Carioca Serie A2 and B1 during 2022.
