= Roma (footballer, born 1985) =

Brazilian footballer

Personal information
- Full name: Juliano Laurentino dos Santos
- Date of birth: February 16, 1985 (age 41)
- Place of birth: João Pessoa, Brazil
- Height: 1.70 m (5 ft 7 in)
- Position: Winger

Team information
- Current team: América

Senior career*
Years	Team	Apps	(Gls)
2001	CSA	–	(–)
2002–2003	Sport	–	(–)
2003–2005	Valdevez	53	(27)
2005–2008	Beira-Mar	57	(18)
2008	Foolad	2	(0)
2008–2009	Covilhã	22	(6)
2009–2010	Doxa Katokopias	28	(9)
2011	Central	11	(5)
2011	Campinense	0	(0)
2012–	América	–	(–)
- * Club domestic league appearances and goals as of 6 February 2013, 17:37 UTC

Juliano Laurentino dos Santos (born 16 February 1985 in João Pessoa), commonly known as Roma, is a Brazilian footballer who plays for América Futebol Clube (PE) as a winger.
