= João Franco Barreto =

Portuguese priest, writer, & translator (1600–c.1674)

João Franco Barreto (1600 – c. 1674) was a 17th-century Portuguese writer, philologist, bibliographer, and priest. He is especially remembered for his role as an embassy secretary in Paris after the Portuguese Restoration and for his contributions to literature, linguistics, and translation. He was a translator of Virgil.

== Biography ==
João Franco Barreto was born in Lisbon in 1600, likely in the parish of Santa Engrácia. In 1641 he served as secretary of a diplomatic mission sent by King John IV of Portugal to Paris. The embassy sought recognition by Louis XIII of France for Portugal’s restored monarchy. After being widowed, he entered the priesthood and devoted himself primarily to religious service and scholarly work. He served as parish priest in Redondo and later in Barreiro. Barreto was respected for his learning.

== Works ==
Barreto was a prolific author and translator who contributed significantly to Portuguese literature and linguistics.

=== Notable works ===
- Relaçam da viagem que a França fizeram Francisco de Mello, Monteiro-mor do Reyno, & o Doutor Antonio Coelho de Carvalho (Lisbon, 1642): a detailed account of his embassy to France.
- Eneida portugueza (Lisbon, 1644; reprinted 1763): a Portuguese translation of Virgil’s Aeneid, accompanied by a glossary.
- Micrologia em a qual se explicam todos os nomes próprios dos "Lusiadas" (date unknown): a reference work explaining all proper names in Luís de Camões’s Os Lusíadas.
- Ortografia da Lingua Portuguesa (1670): a work on Portuguese orthography which includes observations on grammatical usage and regional pronunciation variants.

He also translated works by Latin authors such as Virgil and Horace.

== Legacy ==
João Franco Barreto’s contributions to literature and linguistics, especially his work on orthography and translation, are considered significant for Portuguese cultural and intellectual history.
