= Filipe Falardo =

Portuguese footballer (born 1983)

Personal information
- Full name: Filipe Miguel Falardo Casimiro
- Date of birth: 31 October 1983 (age 43)
- Place of birth: Vila Franca de Xira, Portugal
- Height: 1.74 m (5 ft 9 in)
- Position: Midfielder

Youth career
- 1991–1992: Alverca
- 1994–1997: Sporting CP
- 1997–2002: Alverca

Senior career*
Years	Team	Apps	(Gls)
2002–2005	Alverca	30	(0)
2002–2003	→ Benfica B (loan)		
2005–2008	Olivais Moscavide	57	(14)
2007–2008	→ Fátima (loan)	28	(0)
2008–2009	Gloria Buzău	9	(1)
2009–2010	Atlético	4	(0)
2010–2011	Digenis Akritas	8	(1)
2011	Atlético	18	(1)
2011–2012	Pinhalnovense	30	(6)
2012–2013	Farense	18	(0)
2013–2014	Pinhalnovense	32	(9)
2014–2016	Cova Piedade	46	(11)
Total		280	(43)

International career
2001	Portugal U17	2	(1)
2002	Portugal U19	2	(0)
2003	Portugal U20	5	(1)
- * Club domestic league appearances and goals

Filipe Miguel Falardo Casimiro (born 31 October 1983), known as Falardo, is a Portuguese retired footballer who played as a midfielder.

== Club career ==
Born in Vila Franca de Xira, Lisbon District, Falardo spent most of his youth career with F.C. Alverca. On 25 April 2004, he played his first and only game in the Primeira Liga, coming on as a 22nd minute substitute in a 0–1 away loss against FC Porto.

Subsequently, Falardo alternated between his country's second and third divisions, also having spells abroad in Romania and Cyprus.
