= Diogo Barbosa Machado =

Portuguese bibliographer

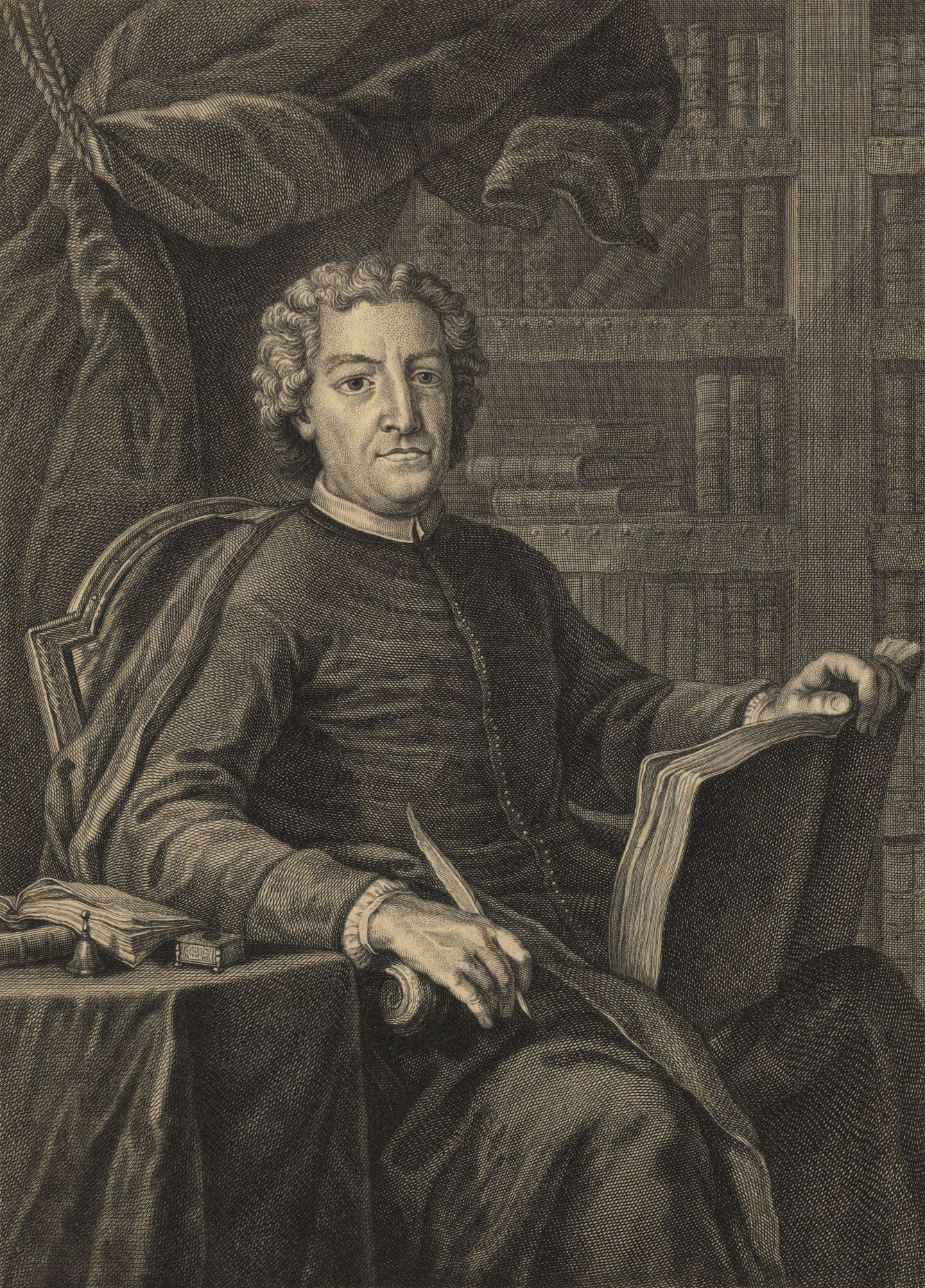
- Engraving by Henri Simon Thomassin, c. 1730; National Library of Portugal
- Born: 31 March 1682; Lisbon, Portugal
- Died: 9 August 1772 (aged 90); Lisbon, Portugal
- Occupations: Priest, bibliographer
- Notable work: Bibliotheca Lusitana

Diogo Barbosa Machado (31 March 1682 – 9 August 1772) was a Portuguese Catholic priest and noted bibliographer.

His greatest work, Bibliotheca Lusitana, was the first great bibliographical reference book published in Portugal. He offered his impressive book, pamphlet, and engraving collection to King Joseph I after the royal library burned down during the 1755 Lisbon earthquake. It was taken to Brazil during the transfer of the Portuguese court to Brazil; the Barbosa Machado collection remains one of the most important in the National Library of Brazil.
