= João Pedro (footballer, born December 1987) =

Portuguese footballer

Personal information
- Full name: João Pedro Azevedo Silva
- Date of birth: 29 December 1987 (age 38)
- Place of birth: Trofa, Portugal
- Height: 1.90 m (6 ft 3 in)
- Position: Centre-back

Youth career
- 1996–2002: Trofense
- 2002–2005: Porto

Senior career*
Years	Team	Apps	(Gls)
2005–2010	Porto B	18	(1)
2006	→ Tourizense (loan)	5	(0)
2007	→ Portimonense (loan)	12	(2)
2007–2008	→ Penafiel (loan)	20	(3)
2008–2009	→ Gloria Bistriţa (loan)	16	(3)
2009–2010	→ Portimonense (loan)	21	(1)
2010–2012	Aves	51	(3)
2012–2014	Estoril	6	(0)
2014–2015	Penafiel	9	(0)
2015	Moreirense	5	(0)
2015–2016	Famalicão	29	(7)
2016–2017	Aves	35	(5)
2017–2018	Santa Clara	22	(1)
2018–2019	Estoril	13	(0)
2019–2021	Leixões	17	(1)
Total		279	(27)

International career
2003	Portugal U16	4	(0)
2003–2004	Portugal U17	18	(3)
2005	Portugal U18	9	(2)
2005–2006	Portugal U19	20	(4)
2006–2007	Portugal U20	10	(0)
2007	Portugal U21	1	(0)
- * Club domestic league appearances and goals

João Pedro Azevedo Silva (born 29 December 1987), known as João Pedro, is a Portuguese former professional footballer who played as a central defender.

== Club career ==
Born in Trofa, Porto District, João Pedro began his youth career at hometown club C.D. Trofense and finished it at FC Porto, where he made his senior debut with the reserves in the third division. He was also called up twice to the first team for Primeira Liga matches in which he was an unused substitute, including the 1–1 away draw against city rivals Boavista F.C. on the final day of the season. He was subsequently sent out on a string of loans, including spending the 2008–09 campaign at ACF Gloria Bistrița in Romania's Liga I.

In 2010, João Pedro left the Estádio do Dragão to sign for C.D. Aves of the Segunda Liga, and on 29 June 2012 he joined top-flight G.D. Estoril Praia. He made his debut in the latter competition on 17 August in the opening game of the season, but added only four more appearances over the campaign and just one substitute cameo in the next.

João Pedro's 2014–15 was spent between F.C. Penafiel and Moreirense F.C. in the top tier, totalling just 14 games in all. On 31 August 2014, in just his second appearance for the former side, he was sent off in a 0–1 home loss to F.C. Paços de Ferreira.

Subsequently, João Pedro returned to division two with F.C. Famalicão, scoring a career-best seven goals in his only season. He continued to play there the following campaigns, with Aves, C.D. Santa Clara, Estoril and Leixões SC.

== International career ==
All youth levels comprised, João Pedro won 62 caps for Portugal and scored nine goals. His only game with the under-21 side occurred on 12 October 2007, in a 1–0 defeat in Bulgaria for the 2009 UEFA European Championship qualifiers.

Previously, João Pedro represented the nation at the 2007 FIFA U-20 World Cup in Canada, starting in three of his four appearances in a round-of-16 exit.
