= Acebedo =

Acebedo Acebéu
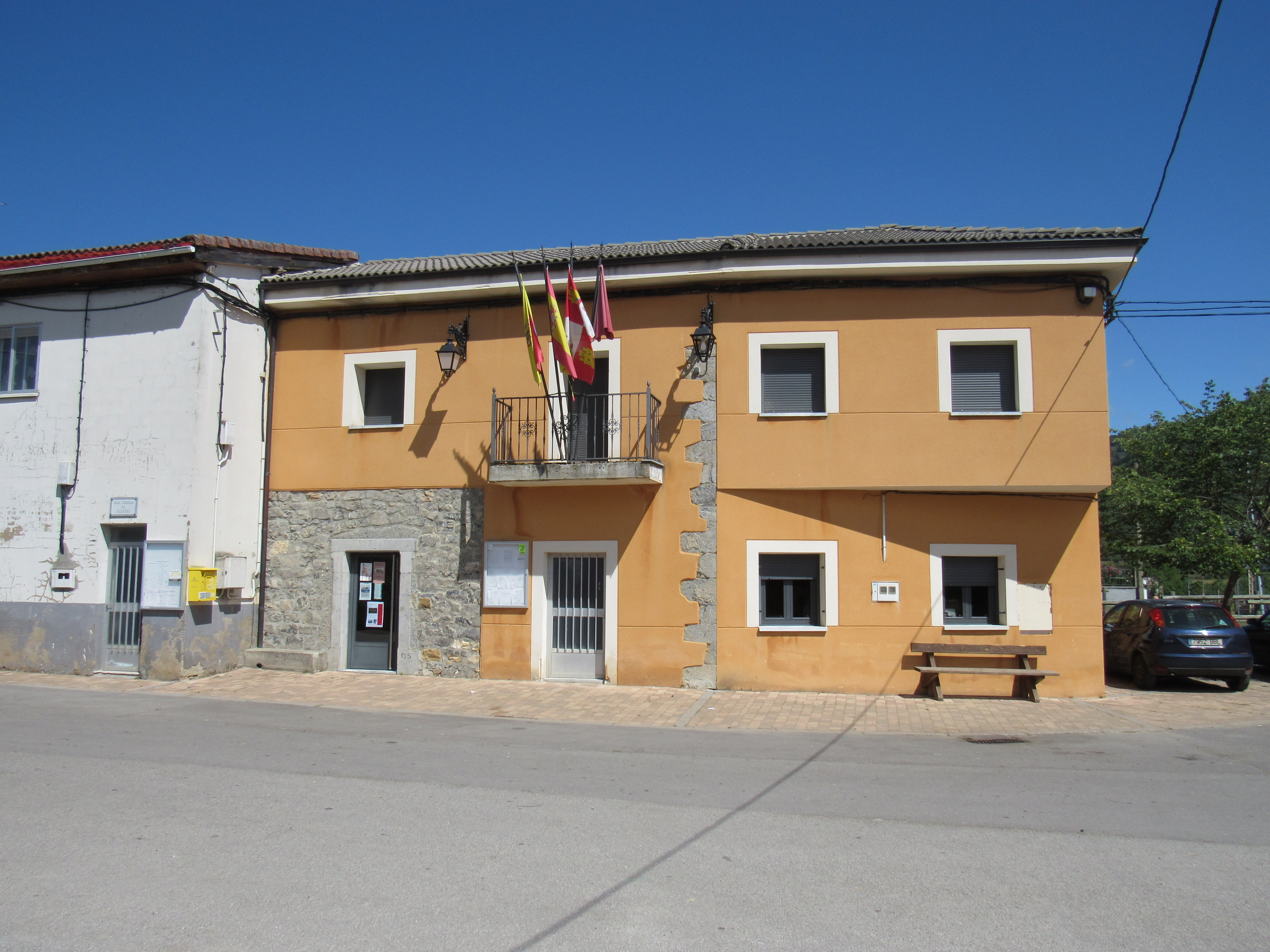
- Town hall

- Flag Coat of arms

- Location within Spain
- Coordinates: 43°02′20″N 5°7′0″W
- Country: Spain
- Autonomous community: Castile and León
- Province: León
- Municipality: Acebedo

Government
  - Mayor: Pedro del Blanco Piñán (PSOE)

Area
  - Total: 50.18 km^{2} (19.37 sq mi)
- Elevation: 1,148 m (3,766 ft)

Population (2025-01-01)
  - Total: 181
  - Density: 3.61/km^{2} (9.34/sq mi)
- Demonyms: acebedo, acebeda
- Time zone: UTC+1 (CET)
  - Summer (DST): UTC+2 (CEST)
- Postal Code: 24996
- Telephone prefix: 987
- Climate: Cfb

Acebedo (Leonese: Acebéu), is a municipality located in the northeast of the province of León, Castile and León, Spain. According to the 2010 census (INE), the municipality had a population of 264 inhabitants.

Attached to this municipality are the villages of Liegos and La Uña.
