= 2008 Taça de Portugal final =

- Event: 2007–08 Taça de Portugal
Porto	Sporting CP
0	2
- Date: 18 May 2008
- Venue: Estádio Nacional, Oeiras
- Referee: Olegário Benquerença (Leiria)
- Attendance: 37,600

The 2008 Taça de Portugal final was the final match of the 2007–08 Taça de Portugal, the 68th season of the Taça de Portugal, the premier Portuguese football cup competition organized by the Portuguese Football Federation (FPF). The match was played on 18 May 2008 at the Estádio Nacional in Oeiras, and opposed two Primeira Liga sides: Porto and Sporting CP. Sporting CP defeated Porto 2–0, thanks to two extra-time goals from Brazilian striker Rodrigo Tiuí which would give Sporting CP their fifteenth Taça de Portugal.

In Portugal, the final was televised live in HD on SIC and Sport TV. As Sporting CP claimed their fifteenth Taça de Portugal, they qualified for the 2008 Supertaça Cândido de Oliveira, where they took on the winners of the 2007–08 Primeira Liga, Porto at the Estádio Algarve.

== Match ==
=== Details ===
18 May 2008
17:00 WEST

Porto	0–2 (a.e.t.)	Sporting CP
		Tiuí 111', 117'

Estádio Nacional, Oeiras
Attendance: 37,600
Referee: Olegário Benquerença (Leiria)

Porto	Sporting CP

GK	1	(Portugal) Nuno
RB	13	(Uruguay) Jorge Fucile
CB	2	(Portugal) Bruno Alves
CB	3	(Portugal) Pedro Emanuel (c)
LB	14	(Portugal) João Paulo	(red card) 71'
DM	6	(Brazil) Paulo Assunção	(yellow card) 36'	(substituted off) 112'
CM	8	(Argentina) Lucho González	(yellow card) 113'
CM	16	(Portugal) Raul Meireles	(yellow card) 96'	(substituted off) 104'
RW	11	(Argentina) Mariano González		(substituted off) 79'
LW	7	(Portugal) Ricardo Quaresma
CF	9	(Argentina) Lisandro López
Substitutes:
GK	24	(Portugal) Hugo Ventura
DF	4	(Serbia) Milan Stepanov
DF	15	(Brazil) Lino		(substituted on) 79'
MF	17	(Morocco) Tarik Sektioui		(substituted on) 112'
MF	18	(Argentina) Mario Bolatti
MF	25	(Poland) Przemysław Kaźmierczak		(substituted on) 104'
FW	19	(Argentina) Ernesto Farías
Manager:
(Portugal) Jesualdo Ferreira

GK	1	(Portugal) Rui Patrício
RB	78	(Portugal) Abel	(yellow card) 54'	(substituted off) 90'
CB	13	(Portugal) Tonel
CB	4	(Brazil) Ânderson Polga
LB	18	(Argentina) Leandro Grimi
DM	24	(Portugal) Miguel Veloso
CM	28	(Portugal) João Moutinho (c)
CM	7	(Russia) Marat Izmailov		(substituted off) 76'
AM	30	(Argentina) Leandro Romagnoli
CF	11	(Brazil) Derlei	(yellow card) 101'	(substituted off) 113'
CF	20	(Portugal) Yannick Djaló
Substitutes:
GK	16	(Portugal) Tiago
DF	26	(Brazil) Gladstone		(substituted on) 113'
MF	8	(Brazil) Ronny
MF	10	(Montenegro) Simon Vukčević
MF	21	(Sweden) Pontus Farnerud
MF	25	(Portugal) Bruno Pereirinha		(substituted on) 76'
FW	22	(Brazil) Rodrigo Tiuí		(substituted on) 90'
Manager:
(Portugal) Paulo Bento

2007–08 Taça de Portugal Winners
Sporting CP
15th Title

Match officials

- Assistant referees:
  - Valter Oliveira (Leiria)
  - Luís Salgado (Setúbal)
- Fourth official: Hugo Miguel (Lisbon)

Match rules

- 90 minutes
- Penalty shoot-out if scores level after 90 minutes
- Seven named substitutes
- Maximum of three substitutions

== See also ==
- FC Porto–Sporting CP rivalry
- 2007–08 FC Porto season
- 2008 Taça da Liga final
