= 2007–08 FC Porto season =

Porto
2007–08 season
- Chairman: Pinto da Costa
- Manager: Jesualdo Ferreira
- Stadium: Estádio do Dragão
- Primeira Liga: 1st
- Taça de Portugal: Runners-up
- Taça da Liga: Third round
- UEFA Champions League: First knockout round
- Supertaça Cândido de Oliveira: Runners-up
- Top goalscorer: League: Lisandro López (24); All: Lisandro López (27)
- Highest home attendance: 50,199 vs Benfica (15 October 2006)
- Lowest home attendance: 12,117 vs Gil Vicente (24 February 2008)
Home colours	Away colours

The 2007–08 season was Futebol Clube do Porto's 97th competitive season, 74th consecutive season in the top flight of Portuguese football, and 114th year in existence as a football club.

Porto's season began on 11 August 2007 with the Supertaça Cândido de Oliveira. The Azuis e Brancos were defeated by Sporting CP, 1–0. Porto's league campaign began a week later on the 18. Going into the 2007–08 season, Porto were the holders of the Primeira Liga after claiming the league title on the last day of the season. The 2007–08 league campaign saw the Portistas claim a 23rd Portuguese top-flight title on 5 April 2008 over Estrela da Amadora.

Porto competed in the two domestic cups, the Taça de Portugal and the Taça da Liga. In the Taça de Portugal, the Dragões progressed through five rounds to reach the final, where they were defeated by Sporting CP at the Jamor. Porto entered the Taça da Liga in the third round, where they were eliminated by Liga de Honra side Fátima.

In Europe, Porto progressed through a group consisting of Liverpool, Marseille and Beşiktaş to reach the first knockout round. For a second consecutive season, Porto were eliminated at the first knockout round stage as they lost on penalties to German side Schalke after 1–1 scoreline over two legs.

== First-team squad ==
=== 2007-2008 Season ===
Stats as of the end of the 2007–08 season. Games played and goals scored only refers to appearances and goals in the Primeira Liga.

No.	Name	Nationality	Position(s)	Since	Date of birth (age)	Signed from	Games	Goals
Goalkeepers
0	Helton	(Brazil)	GK	2005	18 May 1978 (aged 30)	(Portugal) União de Leiria	0	0
0	Mariano Gonzalez	(Argentina)	GK	2008	5 May 1981 (aged 27)	(Italy) US Palermo	0	0
0	Nuno Espírito Santo	(Portugal)	GK	1974	25 January 1974 (aged 34)	(Portugal) Desportivo Aves	0	0
0	Hugo Ventura	(Portugal)	GK	2007	14 January 1988 (aged 20)	(Portugal) Porto Academy	0	0
Defenders
0	Milan Stepanov	(Serbia)	CB	2004	2 April 1983 (aged 25)	(Turkey) Trabzonspor	0	0
0	Pedro Emanuel	(Portugal)	CB	2002	11 February 1975 (aged 33)	(Portugal) Boavista	0	0
0	Marek Čech	(Slovakia)	LB	2005	26 January 1983 (aged 25)	(Czech Republic) Sparta Prague	0	0
0	José Bosingwa	(Portugal)	RB	2003	24 August 1982 (aged 25)	(Portugal) Boavista	0	0
0	Jorge Fucile	(Uruguay)	RB	2006	19 November 1984 (aged 23)	(Uruguay) Liverpool de Montevideo	0	0
0	Bruno Alves (VC)	(Portugal)	CB	2001	27 November 1981 (aged 26)	(Portugal) Porto Academy	0	0
0	Lino	(Brazil)	LB	2007	1 June 1977 (aged 30)	(Portugal) Académica de Coimbra	0	0
0	Andre Pinto	(Portugal)	CB	2006	5 October 1989 (aged 18)	(Portugal) Porto Academy	0	0
0	João Paulo	(Portugal)	CB	2006	6 June 1981 (aged 26)	(Portugal) União de Leiria	0	0
Midfielders
0	Przemyslaw Kazmierczak	(Poland)	DM	2007	5 May 1982 (aged 26)	(Poland) Pogon Szczecin	0	0
0	Lucho González (C)	(Argentina)	CM / AM	2005	19 January 1981 (aged 27)	(Argentina) River Plate	0	0
0	Raul Meireles	(Portugal)	CM	2004	17 March 1983 (aged 25)	(Portugal) Boavista	0	0
0	Paulo Assunção	(Brazil)	DM	2004	25 January 1980 (aged 28)	(Brazil) Nacional	0	0
0	André Castro	(Portugal)	CM	2007	2 April 1988 (aged 20)	(Portugal) Porto Academy	0	0
Forwards
0	Ricardo Quaresma	(Portugal)	LW / RW	2004	26 September 1983 (aged 24)	(Spain) Barcelona	0	0
0	Lisandro López	(Argentina)	CF	2005	2 March 1983 (aged 25)	(Argentina) Racing Club	0	0
0	Tarik Sektioui	(Morocco)	LW / RW	2006	13 May 1977 (aged 31)	(Netherlands) AZ	0	0
0	Leandro Lima	(Brazil)	AM	2007	24 January 1986 (aged 22)	(Brazil) São Caetano	0	0
0	Ernesto Farias	(Argentina)	CF	2007	29 May 1980 (aged 27)	(Argentina) River Plate	0	0
0	Edgar	(Brazil)	CF	2007	3 January 1979 (aged 29)	(Portugal) Marítimo	0	0
0	Rabiola	(Portugal)	CF	2007	25 July 1989 (aged 18)	(Brazil) Vitória S.C.	0	0
0	Hélder Postiga	(Portugal)	CF	2004	2 August 1982 (aged 25)	(England) Tottenham Hotspur	0	0
0	Adriano	(Brazil)	CF	2006	3 January 1979 (aged 29)	(Brazil) Cruzeiro	0	0
0	Bruno Moraes	(Brazil)	CF	2003	7 July 1984 (aged 23)	(Brazil) Santos	0	0

== Key events ==
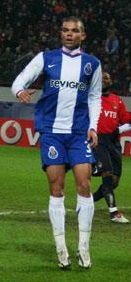
Brazilian central defender Pepe was signed by Real Madrid for €30 million.

=== May ===
- 25: After five years at the club where he was primarily used as a back up in the full-back position to Nuno Valente, Pedro Emanuel and Ricardo Costa, César Peixoto leaves the Dragões to join Primeira Liga club Braga on a free transfer.
- 31: English club Manchester United sign Brazilian midfielder Anderson for €30 million.

=== June ===
- 2: Porto announce the signing of Brazilian defensive midfielder Fernando from Vila Nova as a replacement for Anderson.
- 15: Porto sign Polish midfielder Przemysław Kaźmierczak from Pogoń Szczecin for €1.3 million. Kaźmierczak had been on loan to Portuguese side Boavista during the 2006–07 season where his displays attracted interest from several European clubs.

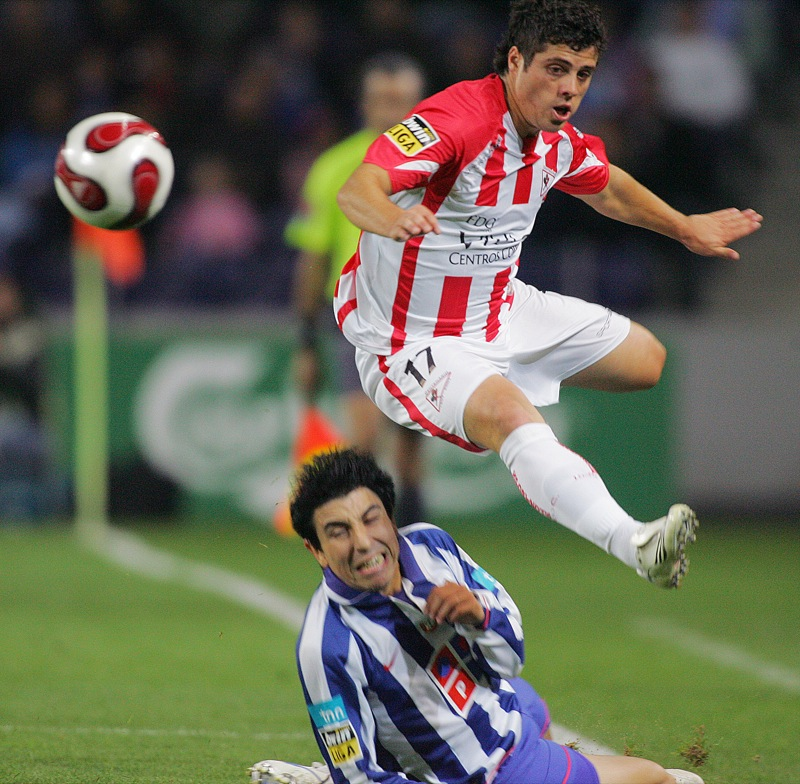
Jorge Fucile (left) and Vieirinha (right) compete for the ball during the Porto–Leixões fixture on 29 October 2007.

=== July ===
- 7: Porto defeat third side division side Tourizense in their first pre-season game of the season. In a match which saw nine goals, the Portistas would six score of those. Porto's goals came from Adriano, Edgar, Hélder Postiga, Ricardo Quaresma and Luis Aguiar, who scored twice.
- 10: Spanish club Real Madrid sign Pepe from Porto for €30 million.
- 11: In the first game of their tour of the Netherlands, Porto thrash amateur Dutch side Sportclub Irene 10–0.
- 14: Porto follow up their thrashing of Sportclub Irene, with a 4–0 victory over second division Den Bosch to claim their third consecutive pre-season win.
- 16: Argentine midfielder Mariano González signs for the Portistas from Italian side Palermo on a season-long loan.
- 18: Belgian side Genk inflict on the Azuis e Brancos their first defeat of the pre-season campaign.
- 19: Serbian defender Milan Stepanov signs from Trabzonspor for fee of €3.4 million.
- 21: In Porto's official presentation to its members of their 2007–08 squad, the Dragões defeat French side Monaco, 2–1. Lisandro López and Hélder Postiga scored Porto's goals.
- 26: Porto win the Centenarian Atlanta Tournament after claiming two 1–0 victories over Serbian side Red Star Belgrade and tournament hosts Atalanta.

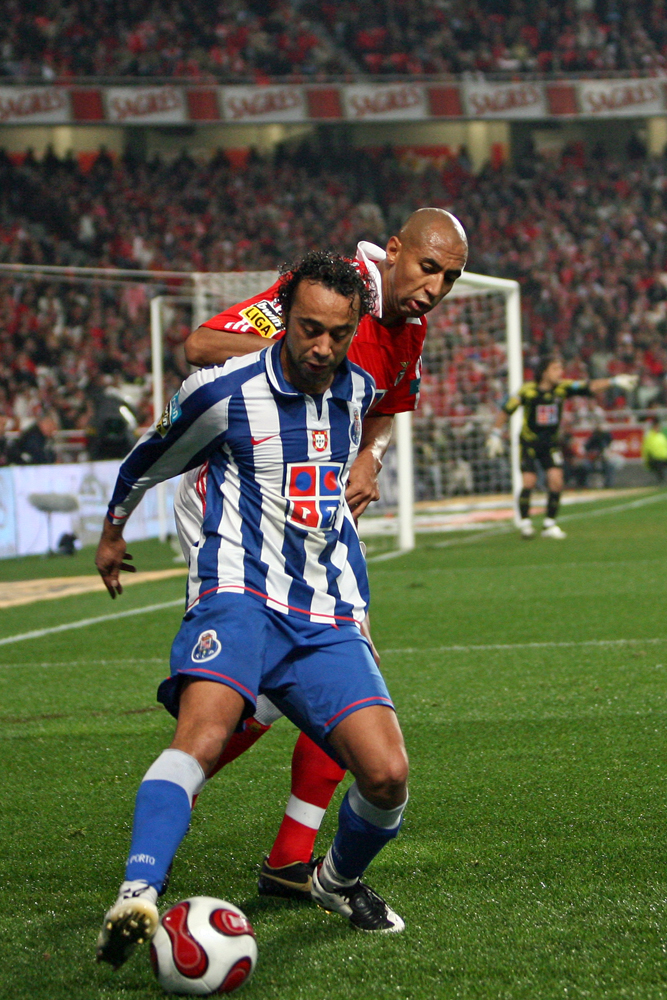
Tarik Sektioui (left) in action for Porto against Benfica on 1 December 2007.

=== August ===
- 3: Porto start off their last tournament of the pre-season campaign with a 0–0 draw against Feyenoord in the Rotterdam Tournament.
- 5: Porto claim a 3–0 a victory over Chinese side Shanghai Shenhua, to win the Rotterdam pre-season tournament.
- 11: The Dragões begin their season with a defeat to Sporting CP in the Supertaça Cândido de Oliveira.
- 18: Porto start off their 2007–08 league campaign with a 2–1 win away to Braga. Ricardo Quaresma's late free-kick provided the away side with the three points.
- 26: Just two weeks after losing the Supertaça Cândido de Oliveira to Sporting CP, Porto defeat the Lisbon side 1–0. Raul Meireles scored Porto's only goal of the game.
- 30: Porto draws Beşiktaş, Liverpool and Marseille in the Champions League draw.

=== September ===
- 27: Porto suffer a shock third round exit at the hands of Fátima in the Taça da Liga. After the match ended 0–0 in normal time, the game proceeded to penalties where Fátima's Marinho scored the winning penalty to send his side through to the next round after Porto's Mariano González missed his spot kick.

=== October ===
- 29: The Azuis e Brancos defeat Leixões, 3–0 in game week 8 to win their eighth consecutive league game of the campaign.

=== December ===
- 1: Porto defeat Benfica on match day 12. Ricardo Quaresma's 42nd-minute strike gave Porto the victory over the Encarnados to give his team a seven-point lead over their Lisbon rivals.

=== January ===
- 15: After only two league starts during the first half of the 2007–08 season, Portuguese striker Hélder Postiga moves to Greek side Panathinaikos on a six-month loan.

=== February ===
- 10: Porto comfortably defeat fourth division side Sertanense 4–0 to progress to the quarter-finals of the cup. Ernesto Farías, Tarik Sektioui and Przemysław Kaźmierczak scored Porto's goals.

=== April ===
- 30: Porto renews the contracts of Tarik Sektioui and Leandro Lima. The Moroccan's contract was renewed for another season, whilst Lima's was renewed until 2013.

== Pre-season and friendlies ==
=== Legend ===
Win Draw Loss

=== Matches ===
7 July 2007 Friendly	Porto	6–3	Tourizense	Olival, Portugal
WEST	Adriano; Edgar; Postiga; Aguiar, Quaresma		D. Silva; Licá; Rui Miguel	Stadium: CTFD PortoGaia

11 July 2007 Netherlands Tour	Irene	0–10	Porto	Tegelen, Netherlands
CET			Adriano, Alves; Edgar; Postiga, López; Quaresma, Rentería	Stadium: Sportpark De Bakenbos

14 July 2007 Netherlands Tour	Den Bosch	0–4	Porto	's-Hertogenbosch, Netherlands
CET	López 2'; Postiga 50' (pen.); Rentería 72'; Sektioui 80'			Stadium: De Vliert

18 July 2007 Friendly	Genk	1–0	Porto	Genk, Belgium
20:00 CET	Barda 15'			Stadium: Cristal Arena

21 July 2007 Friendly	Porto	2–1	Monaco	Porto, Portugal
WEST	López 37'; Postiga 52' (pen.)		Pino 80'	Stadium: Estádio do Dragão

26 July 2007 Centenarian Atlanta Tournament	Porto	1–0	Red Star Belgrade	Bergamo, Italy
20:35 CET	Adriano 9'			Stadium: Stadio Atleti Azzurri d'Italia; Referee: Emiliano Galione (Italy)

26 July 2007 Centenarian Atlanta Tournament	Atalanta	0–1	Porto	Bergamo, Italy
22:40 CET			López 8'	Stadium: Stadio Atleti Azzurri d'Italia; Referee: Emiliano Galione (Italy)

28 July 2007 Friendly	Boavista	0–3	Porto	Porto, Portugal
WEST			Postiga 22'; Sektioui 78', 88'	Stadium: Estádio do Bessa

3 August 2007 Rotterdam Tournament	Porto	0–0	Feyenoord	Rotterdam, Netherlands
CET				Stadium: De Kuip

5 August 2007 Rotterdam Tournament	Porto	3–0	Shanghai Shenhua	Rotterdam, Netherlands
CET			Sektioui 5'; Lima 38', 41'	Stadium: De Kuip

== Competitions ==
=== Legend ===
Win Draw Loss

=== Overall ===
Competition	Started round	Final position / round	First match	Last match
Supertaça Cândido de Oliveira	Final	Runners-up	11 August 2007	
Primeira Liga		1st	18 August 2007	10 May 2008
Taça de Portugal	Fourth round	Runners-up	7 December 2007	18 May 2008
Taça da Liga	Third round	Third round	26 September 2007	
UEFA Champions League	Group stage	First knockout round	18 September 2007	5 March 2008

=== Supertaça Cândido de Oliveira ===
11 August 2007	Porto	0–1	Sporting CP	Estádio Dr. Magalhães Pessoa, Leiria
21:00 WEST			Izmailov 75'	Attendance: 21,863; Referee: Bruno Paixão (Setúbal)

=== Taça de Portugal ===
7 December 2007 4	Chaves	0–2	Porto	Estádio Municipal de Chaves, Chaves
19:30 WET			Postiga 53'; Adriano 90+2'	Referee: Elmano Santos (Madeira)

19 January 2008 5	Porto	2–0	Desportivo das Aves	Estádio do Dragão, Porto
WET	Farías 31'; Quaresma 90+4'			Attendance: 20,319; Referee: Artur Soares Dias (Porto)

10 February 2008 6	Sertanense	0–4	Porto	Campo de Jogos Doutor Marques dos Santos, Sertã
WET			Sektioui 8'; Farías 36', 49'; Kaźmierczak 45'	Referee: Lucílio Batista (Setúbal)

27 February 2008 QF	Porto	1–0	Gil Vicente	Estádio do Dragão, Porto
WET	Sektioui 22'			Attendance: 12,117; Referee: Paulo Pereira (Viana do Castelo)

15 April 2008 SF	Vitória de Setúbal	0–3	Porto	Estádio do Bonfim, Setúbal
20:30 WEST			Jorginho 37' (o.g.); L. González 51', 60'	Referee: Pedro Proença

18 May 2008 F	Porto	0–2 (a.e.t.)	Sporting CP	Estádio Nacional, Oeiras
17:00 WEST			Tiuí 111', 117'	Attendance: 37,600; Referee: Olegário Benquerença (Leiria)

=== Taça da Liga ===
26 September 2007 3	Fátima	0–0 (4–2 p)	Porto	Estádio Municipal de Fátima, Fátima
19:15 WET				Attendance: 2,800; Referee: Carlos Xistra (Castelo Branco)
	Penalties
	Xavier (penalty scored); Saleiro (penalty scored); Moreira (penalty scored); Marinho (penalty scored)		(penalty scored) João Paulo; (penalty scored) Lima; (penalty missed) Lino; (penalty missed) M. González

=== UEFA Champions League ===
==== Group stage ====
Pos	Team	Pld	W	D	L	GF	GA	GD	Pts	Qualification	POR	LIV	MAR	BES
1	(Portugal) Porto	6	3	2	1	8	7	+1	11	Advance to knockout stage	—	1–1	2–1	2–0
2	(England) Liverpool	6	3	1	2	18	5	+13	10	Advance to knockout stage	4–1	—	0–1	8–0
3	(France) Marseille	6	2	1	3	6	9	−3	7	Transfer to UEFA Cup	1–1	0–4	—	2–0
4	(Turkey) Beşiktaş	6	2	0	4	4	15	−11	6		0–1	2–1	2–1	—

Source: RSSSF

18 September 2007 1	Porto (Portugal)	1–1	(England) Liverpool	Porto
20:45 CEST (UTC+02:00)	L. González 8' (pen.)	Report	Kuyt 17'	Stadium: Estádio do Dragão; Attendance: 41,208; Referee: Ľuboš Micheľ (Slovakia)

3 October 2007 2	Beşiktaş (Turkey)	0–1	(Portugal) Porto	Istanbul
20:45 CEST (UTC+02:00)		Report	Quaresma 90+2'	Stadium: BJK İnönü Stadium; Attendance: 19,795; Referee: Pieter Vink (Netherlands)

24 October 2007 3	Marseille (France)	1–1	(Portugal) Porto	Marseille
20:45 CEST (UTC+02:00)	Niang 70'	Report	L. González 79' (pen.)	Stadium: Stade Vélodrome; Attendance: 46,458; Referee: Manuel Mejuto González (Spain)

6 November 2007 4	Porto (Portugal)	2–1	(France) Marseille	Porto
20:45 CET (UTC+01:00)	Sektioui 27'; López 78'	Report	Niang 47'	Stadium: Estádio do Dragão; Attendance: 42,217; Referee: Wolfgang Stark (Germany)

28 November 2007 5	Liverpool (England)	4–1	(Portugal) Porto	Liverpool
20:45 CET (UTC+01:00)	Torres 19', 78'; Gerrard 84' (pen.); Crouch 87'	Report	López 33'	Stadium: Anfield; Attendance: 41,095; Referee: Roberto Rosetti (Italy)

11 December 2007 6	Porto (Portugal)	2–0	(Turkey) Beşiktaş	Porto
20:45 CET (UTC+01:00)	L. González 44'; Quaresma 62'	Report		Stadium: Estádio do Dragão; Attendance: 39,608; Referee: Peter Fröjdfeldt (Sweden)

==== Round of 16 ====
19 February 2008 1st leg	Schalke 04 (Germany)	1–0	(Portugal) Porto	Gelsenkirchen
20:45 CET (UTC+01:00)	Kurányi 4'	Report		Stadium: Arena AufSchalke; Attendance: 53,951; Referee: Laurent Duhamel (France)

5 March 2008 2nd leg	Porto (Portugal)	1–0 (a.e.t.) (1–1 agg.) (1–4 p)	(Germany) Schalke 04	Porto
20:45 CET (UTC+01:00)	López 86'	Report		Stadium: Estádio do Dragão; Attendance: 45,316; Referee: Howard Webb (England)
	Penalties
	L. González (penalty scored); Alves (penalty missed); López (penalty missed)		(penalty scored) Rafinha; (penalty scored) Rakitić; (penalty scored) Altıntop; (penalty scored) Jones
