= 2007 Supertaça Cândido de Oliveira =

- Event: Supertaça Cândido de Oliveira (Portuguese Super Cup)
Porto	Sporting CP
0	1
- Date: 11 August 2007
- Venue: Estádio Dr. Magalhães Pessoa, Leiria
- Man of the Match: Marat Izmailov (Sporting CP)
- Referee: Bruno Paixão (Setúbal)
- Attendance: 21,863

The 2007 Supertaça Cândido de Oliveira was the 29th edition of the Supertaça Cândido de Oliveira, the annual Portuguese football season-opening match contested by the winners of the previous season's top league and cup competitions (or cup runner-up in case the league- and cup-winning club is the same). The match was contested between the 2006–07 Primeira Liga winners Porto, and the 2006–07 Taça de Portugal winners, Sporting CP.

The match took place on the 11 August at the Estádio Dr. Magalhães Pessoa in Leiria. The match which was televised on RTP1, saw Sporting CP defeat Porto 1–0, with a second half goal from Russian midfielder Marat Izmailov.

== Match ==
=== Details ===
11 August 2007
21:00 UTC

Porto	0–1	Sporting CP
		Izmailov 75'

Estádio Dr. Magalhães Pessoa, Leiria
Attendance: 21,863
Referee: Bruno Paixão (Setúbal)

Porto	Sporting CP

GK	1	(Brazil) Helton
RB	12	(Portugal) José Bosingwa
CB	2	(Portugal) Bruno Alves
CB	3	(Portugal) Pedro Emanuel (c)	(yellow card) 11'
LB	13	(Uruguay) Jorge Fucile
DM	6	(Brazil) Paulo Assunção	(yellow card) 2'	(substituted off) 84'
CM	16	(Portugal) Raul Meireles		(substituted off) 78'
CM	5	(Slovakia) Marek Čech		(substituted off) 75'
RW	8	(Brazil) Anderson
LW	7	(Portugal) Ricardo Quaresma
CF	28	(Brazil) Adriano
Substitutes:
GK	33	(Portugal) Nuno
DF	14	(Portugal) João Paulo
MF	11	(Argentina) Mariano González		(substituted on) 78'
MF	17	(Morocco) Tarik Sektioui
MF	18	(Argentina) Mario Bolatti
MF	20	(Brazil) Leandro Lima		(substituted on) 84'
MF	25	(Poland) Przemysław Kaźmierczak		(substituted on) 75'
Manager:
(Portugal) Jesualdo Ferreira

GK	34	(Serbia) Vladimir Stojković
RB	78	(Portugal) Abel	(yellow card) 16'
CB	13	(Portugal) Tonel
CB	4	(Brazil) Ânderson Polga	(yellow card) 59'
LB	2	(Brazil) Pedro Silva		(substituted off) 10'
DM	24	(Portugal) Miguel Veloso
CM	28	(Portugal) João Moutinho (c)
CM	7	(Russia) Marat Izmailov
AM	30	(Argentina) Leandro Romagnoli		(substituted off) 86'
CF	11	(Brazil) Derlei		(substituted off) 87'
CF	31	(Brazil) Liédson	(yellow card) 90'
Substitutes:
GK	16	(Portugal) Tiago
DF	26	(Brazil) Gladstone		(substituted on) 86'
MF	6	(Portugal) Adrien Silva
MF	8	(Brazil) Ronny		(substituted on) 10'
MF	10	(Montenegro) Simon Vukčević
MF	21	(Sweden) Pontus Farnerud
FW	20	(Portugal) Yannick Djaló		(substituted on) 87'
Manager:
(Portugal) Paulo Bento

2007 Supertaça Cândido de Oliveira Winners
Sporting CP
6th Title

Man of the match

- (Russia) Marat Izmailov (Sporting CP)

Match officials

- Assistant referees:
  - António Godinho (Setúbal)
  - Paulo Ramos (Setúbal)
- Fourth official: Marco Ferreira (Madeira)

Match rules

- 90 minutes
- Penalty shoot-out if scores level after 90 minutes
- Seven named substitutes
- Maximum of three substitutions

== See also ==
- FC Porto–Sporting CP rivalry
- 2007–08 Primeira Liga
- 2007–08 Taça de Portugal
- 2007–08 Taça da Liga
- 2007–08 FC Porto season
