= Gladstone (footballer) =

Brazilian footballer (born 1985)

Personal information
- Full name: Gladstone Pereira della Valentina
- Date of birth: 29 January 1985 (age 41)
- Place of birth: Vila Velha, Brazil
- Height: 1.83 m (6 ft 0 in)
- Position: Centre back

Team information
- Current team: Vitória-ES

Youth career
- 2001–2002: Cruzeiro

Senior career*
Years	Team	Apps	(Gls)
2003–2009	Cruzeiro	35	(3)
2005	→ Juventus (loan)	0	(0)
2006	→ Verona (loan)	7	(1)
2007–2008	→ Sporting CP (loan)	13	(1)
2008	→ Palmeiras (loan)	17	(1)
2009	→ Náutico (loan)	12	(1)
2009	→ Portuguesa (loan)	0	(0)
2010–2012	Vaslui	24	(1)
2012–2013	ABC	7	(0)
2013	→ CRB (loan)	0	(0)
2014	Cabofriense	2	(0)
2014–2015	Gil Vicente	4	(0)
2015	Itumbiara	10	(1)
2015	Guarani	17	(1)
2016	Itumbiara	12	(1)
2016	Mogi Mirim	15	(0)
2017	Villa Nova	11	(0)
2017	Botafogo-SP	16	(2)
2018	Botafogo-PB	11	(0)
2019	URT	12	(1)
2019	Votuporanguense	0	(0)
2020	Betim Futebol	5	(1)
2020–	Vitória-ES	3	(0)

International career
2005	Brazil U20	4	(1)
- * Club domestic league appearances and goals as of 15:48, 2 January 2021 (UTC)

Gladstone Pereira della Valentina (born 29 January 1985), known simply as Gladstone, is a Brazilian professional footballer who plays for Vitória-ES as a centre back.

== Club career ==
Born in Vila Velha, Espírito Santo, Gladstone started playing professionally with Cruzeiro Esporte Clube at the age of 18. From then onwards he started a series of consecutive loans, starting in the 2005–06 season in Italy: first with Juventus FC and, after no appearances, with Hellas Verona FC, but the former club chose not to activate the pre-set price of €2 million, one of the reasons being the impending 2006 Italian football scandal; he subsequently returned to Cruzeiro, signing a new three-year deal.

In 2007–08, Gladstone was loaned out again, this time to Sporting CP, where he rarely played due to the presence of compatriot Ânderson Polga and Tonel. Mainly used as a late substitute, he still managed to score once, in a 4–1 Primeira Liga home win against Associação Naval 1º de Maio; after the campaign finished and he helped his team finish second, he closed the year with another loan, at Sociedade Esportiva Palmeiras.

Gladstone moved on 19 January 2009, still owned by Cruzeiro, to Clube Náutico Capibaribe. On 13 February of the following year his contract with the Belo Horizonte side expired, and he returned to Europe, signing for three years with FC Vaslui in Romania.

From 2013 and until his retirement, save for one year back in the Portuguese top division with Gil Vicente FC, Gladstone competed exclusively in the Brazilian lower leagues.

== International career ==
Gladstone was a member of the Brazil under-20 squad at the 2005 FIFA World Youth Championship in the Netherlands, taking home the bronze medal. On 15 November 2006, he was called up to the full side as an injury replacement for the friendly match with Switzerland, but did not make his debut.

On 6 September 2007, Gladstone was again picked by manager Dunga for the games against Mexico and the United States, but did not receive any playing time as well.

== Honours ==
Cruzeiro

- Campeonato Brasileiro Série A: 2003
- Copa do Brasil: 2003
- Campeonato Mineiro: 2003, 2004

Sporting

- Taça de Portugal: 2007–08
- Supertaça Cândido de Oliveira: 2007

Vaslui

- Cupa României: Runner-up 2009–10
