= Leandro Romagnoli =

Argentine former professional footballer (born 1981)

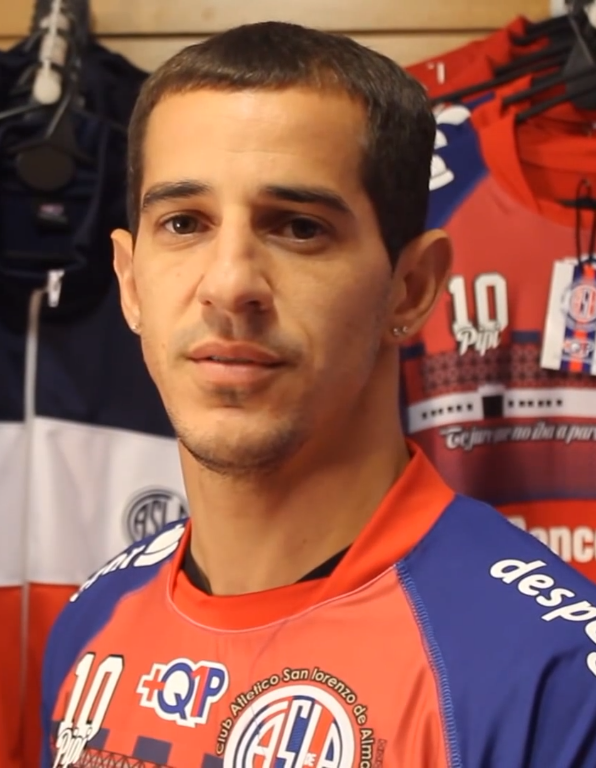
- Romagnoli with San Lorenzo in 2013

Personal information
- Full name: Leandro Atilio Romagnoli
- Date of birth: 17 March 1981 (age 45)
- Place of birth: Buenos Aires, Argentina
- Height: 1.69 m (5 ft 7 in)
- Position: Attacking midfielder

Senior career*
Years	Team	Apps	(Gls)
1998–2004	San Lorenzo	152	(22)
2005–2006	Veracruz	29	(1)
2006	→ Sporting CP (loan)	6	(1)
2006–2009	Sporting CP	65	(7)
2009–2018	San Lorenzo	166	(9)
Total		418	(40)

International career
2001	Argentina U20	6	(2)
2003	Argentina	1	(0)

Managerial career
- 2020: San Lorenzo (assistant)
- 2021–2024: San Lorenzo (reserves)
- 2021: San Lorenzo (caretaker)
- 2024: San Lorenzo (caretaker)
- 2024: San Lorenzo
- 2025: San Martín San Juan
- 2026: Guaraní
- * Club domestic league appearances and goals

Leandro Atilio Romagnoli (born 17 March 1981) is an Argentine former professional footballer who played mainly as an attacking midfielder. He is currently a manager.

His thin build, short stature and playing style were reminiscent of compatriot Osvaldo Ardiles. What the player – nicknamed Pipi – lacked in physical strength, he made up for with dribbling ability.

Romagnoli started and finished his career with San Lorenzo, but also spent four seasons in Portugal with Sporting CP.

== Club career ==
Born in Buenos Aires, Romagnoli made his professional debut on 13 December 1998 at the age of only 17, appearing for San Lorenzo de Almagro against Racing Club de Avellaneda. He went on to become an essential attacking player for the side, appearing in roughly 200 official games and winning three major titles; amid the club's financial troubles, he was linked with a move to SV Werder Bremen of the German Bundesliga in summer 2002.

Romagnoli signed with Mexico's C.D. Veracruz in January 2005 but, in the same month the following year, he was on the move again, now to Sporting CP, first on loan. He initially found it difficult to adjust to his new side, but eventually came into his own in the 2006–07 campaign in a superb end-of-season run for both team and player, winning the Taça de Portugal; the move was subsequently made permanent.

After having appeared in only 16 matches in 2008–09, being out of favour with manager Paulo Bento, Romagnoli left the Estádio José Alvalade in early August 2009 to rejoin San Lorenzo. He contributed ten appearances as they won their first Copa Libertadores in 2014.

On 24 June 2017, the 36-year-old Romagnoli renewed his contract at the Estadio Pedro Bidegain for one more season. He announced his retirement one year later, remaining tied to the club as director of football.

== International career ==
Romagnoli was part of the Argentina under-20 team that won the 2001 FIFA World Youth Championship. He made his debut with the full side against the United States on 8 February 2003, playing 12 minutes in a 1–0 friendly win.

== Coaching career ==
Romagnoli later worked as manager of San Lorenzo's reserves. On two occasions, he was in charge of the first team on an interim basis.

On 12 April 2024, Romagnoli was again named caretaker manager, replacing Rubén Darío Insúa. Six days later, he was confirmed as head coach for the year, but resigned in October.

On 18 March 2025, Romagnoli took over at San Martín de San Juan also in the Argentine Primera División. He stepped down on 17 November, after the club's relegation.

Romagnoli was appointed manager of Club Guaraní in the Paraguayan APF División de Honor on 19 March 2026. He left in July.

== Managerial statistics ==
As of match played 23 May 2026

Managerial record by team and tenure
Team	Nat	From	To	Record							
Team	Nat	From	To	G	W	D	L	GF	GA	GD	Win %
San Lorenzo (interim)	(Argentina)	24 February 2020	15 March 2020	3	3	0	0	10	5	+5	100.00
San Lorenzo (interim)	(Argentina)	10 May 2021	31 May 2021	3	2	0	1	6	2	+4	66.67
San Lorenzo	(Argentina)	12 April 2024	13 October 2024	26	7	9	10	23	25	−2	26.92
San Martín	(Argentina)	18 March 2025	17 November 2025	24	5	8	11	15	27	−12	20.83
Guaraní	(Paraguay)	23 March 2026	14 July 2026	10	4	3	3	9	7	+2	40.00
Total				66	21	20	25	63	66	−3	31.82

== Honours ==
San Lorenzo

- Argentine Primera División: 2001 Clausura, 2013 Inicial
- Supercopa Argentina: 2015
- Copa Libertadores: 2014
- Copa Mercosur: 2001
- Copa Sudamericana: 2002
- FIFA Club World Cup runner-up: 2014

Sporting CP

- Taça de Portugal: 2006–07, 2007–08
- Supertaça Cândido de Oliveira: 2007, 2008
- Taça da Liga runner-up: 2007–08, 2008–09

Argentina U20

- FIFA U-20 World Cup: 2001

Individual

- Primeira Liga Player of the Month: May 2007
