= Tiago Ferreira (footballer, born 1975) =

Portuguese footballer

Tiago
Personal information
- Full name: Tiago Alexandre Baptista Ferreira
- Date of birth: 16 April 1975 (age 51)
- Place of birth: Torres Vedras, Portugal
- Height: 1.80 m (5 ft 11 in)
- Position: Goalkeeper

Youth career
- 1987–1989: A-dos-Cunhados
- 1990–1991: Sobreirense
- 1991–1993: Lourinhanense

Senior career*
Years	Team	Apps	(Gls)
1993–1995	Lourinhanense	28	(0)
1995–2012	Sporting CP	85	(0)
1999–2001	→ Estrela Amadora (loan)	52	(0)
Total		165	(0)
- * Club domestic league appearances and goals

Tiago Alexandre Baptista Ferreira (born 16 April 1975), known simply as Tiago, is a Portuguese former professional footballer who played as a goalkeeper, currently goalkeeper coach of Sporting CP.

== Playing career ==
Born in Torres Vedras, Lisbon District, Tiago spent almost all of his career in Sporting CP. There, he successfully battled for first-choice status with Belgian international Filip De Wilde (1996–98), being loaned to C.F. Estrela da Amadora for two years during Peter Schmeichel's stint at the club. In the 2001–02 season, after the Dane returned to England, he played 18 matches as the Lions won the Primeira Liga championship, his second-best output.

In the following years, more of the same: from 2003 onwards, Tiago played second-fiddle to Ricardo. When the latter moved for Real Betis he backed up youth product Rui Patrício, and remained second or third-choice until his retirement in June 2012 at the age of 37.

== Coaching career ==
After retiring, Tiago started working as a goalkeeper coach for both the youth and reserve teams of Sporting. Ahead of the 2017–18 campaign, he was promoted to the main squad in the same role.

Subsequently, Tiago worked in the same capacity with Portimonense SC's under-23 side and G.D. Chaves. In June 2019, he returned to the Estádio José Alvalade.

== Honours ==
Sporting CP

- Primeira Liga: 2001–02
- Taça de Portugal: 2001–02, 2006–07, 2007–08
- Supertaça Cândido de Oliveira: 1995, 2002, 2007, 2008
- Taça da Liga runner-up: 2007–08, 2008–09
