= Ânderson Polga =

Brazilian footballer (born 1979)

Personal information
- Full name: Ânderson Corrêa Polga
- Date of birth: 9 February 1979 (age 47)
- Place of birth: Santiago, Brazil
- Height: 1.82 m (6 ft 0 in)
- Position: Centre-back

Youth career
- Grêmio

Senior career*
Years	Team	Apps	(Gls)
1999–2003	Grêmio	64	(5)
2003–2012	Sporting CP	221	(0)
2012	Corinthians	3	(0)
Total		288	(5)

International career
2002–2003	Brazil	11	(3)
Medal record
Men's Football
Representing Brazil
FIFA World Cup
Winner	2002 Korea/Japan
- * Club domestic league appearances and goals

Ânderson Corrêa Polga (born 9 February 1979) is a Brazilian former professional footballer who played as a centre-back.

He spent most of his professional career with Sporting in Portugal, appearing in 327 official games (four goals) and winning four major titles. He started playing for Grêmio.

Polga represented the Brazil national team at the 2002 World Cup, winning the competition.

== Club career ==
Groomed at Grêmio Foot-Ball Porto Alegrense, Polga was born in Santiago, Rio Grande do Sul, being an important defensive unit from early on and helping the club to two trophies in 2001: the Rio Grande do Sul State Championship and the Brazilian Cup. He moved to Sporting CP in 2003, becoming the first World Cup champion ever to play in the country.

Polga quickly became a defensive stalwart for the Lisbon-based side, helping them to the UEFA Cup final in his third year – after a run-in with coach José Peseiro, he was an unused substitute in the decisive game, a 3–1 defeat against CSKA Moscow– as well as to four consecutive Primeira Liga runner-up finishes.

Not prone to score, Polga netted his first two goals for the Lions in the 2007–08 UEFA Champions League, in both group stage matches against Dynamo Kyiv. He played in 43 games in all competitions during the season and, in 2009–10, as Sporting could only finish fourth, he lost his starting position to Tonel – who previously had lost his to youth graduate Daniel Carriço – but still managed to appear in 25 official matches (1,983 minutes). He left in June 2012 at the age of 33, and returned to Brazil.

On 5 September 2012, Polga signed for Corinthians who had just sold Leandro Castán and loaned Marquinhos, both to Roma. At the end of the campaign, the club decided against renewing his contract.

== International career ==
Polga made his debut for Brazil in 2002 against Bolivia, being subsequently summoned for that year's FIFA World Cup. He made two complete group stage appearances for the eventual champions.

After 2003, although he displayed good club form in several seasons, Polga was not recalled again.

== Career statistics ==
=== Club ===
Appearances and goals by club, season and competition
Club	Season	League			National Cup		League Cup		Continental		Other		Total	
Club	Season	Division	Apps	Goals	Apps	Goals	Apps	Goals	Apps	Goals	Apps	Goals	Apps	Goals
Grêmio	1999	Série A	1	0			–						1	0
Grêmio	2000	Série A	18	3			–						18	3
Grêmio	2001	Série A	17	0			–		9 (Note: Appearances in Copa Mercosur)	3			17	0
Grêmio	2002	Série A	19	1			–		9 (Note: Appearances in Copa Libertadores)	0			19	1
Grêmio	2003	Série A	9	1			–		6	0			9	1
Grêmio	Total		64	5	0	0	0	0	24	3	0	0	88	8
Sporting CP	2003–04	Primeira Liga	29	0	1	0	0	0	4 (Note: Appearances in UEFA Cup)	0	0	0	34	0
Sporting CP	2004–05	Primeira Liga	26	0	3	0	0	0	10	0	–		39	0
Sporting CP	2005–06	Primeira Liga	30	0	5	0	0	0	4 (Note: Two appearances in UEFA Champions League, two in UEFA Cup)	0	–		39	0
Sporting CP	2006–07	Primeira Liga	28	0	5	0	0	0	6 (Note: Appearances in UEFA Champions League)	0	–		39	0
Sporting CP	2007–08	Primeira Liga	25	0	5	0	5	0	10 (Note: Five appearances, two goals in UEFA Champions League; five Appearances in UEFA Cup)	2	1 (Note: Appearance in Portuguese Super Cup)	0	46	2
Sporting CP	2008–09	Primeira Liga	28	0	2	0	3	0	8	0	1	0	42	0
Sporting CP	2009–10	Primeira Liga	15	0	2	0	1	0	9 (Note: Four Appearances in UEFA Champions League; five appearances in UEFA Europa League)	0	–		27	0
Sporting CP	2010–11	Primeira Liga	20	0	6	0	0	0	8 (Note: Appearances in UEFA Europa League)	1	–		34	1
Sporting CP	2011–12	Primeira Liga	20	0	6	0	2	0	13	0	–		41	0
Sporting CP	Total		221	0	35	0	11	0	72	3	2	0	341	3
Corinthians	2012	Série A	3	0	0	0	–		–		–		3	0
Career total			288	5	35	0	11	0	96	6	2	0	432	11

=== International ===
Scores and results list Brazil's goal tally first, score column indicates score after each Polga goal.

List of international goals scored by Ânderson Polga
No.	Date	Venue	Opponent	Score	Result	Competition
1	31 January 2002	Estádio Serra Dourada, Goiânia, Brazil	Bolivia	6–0	6–0	Friendly
2	7 March 2002	Estádio Governador José Fragelli, Cuiabá, Brazil	Iceland	1–0	6–1	Friendly
3	7 March 2002	Estádio Governador José Fragelli, Cuiabá, Brazil	Iceland	6–0	6–1	Friendly

== Honours ==
Grêmio

- Campeonato Gaúcho: 1999, 2001
- Copa do Brasil: 2001

Sporting

- Taça de Portugal: 2006–07, 2007–08; Runner-up 2011–12
- Supertaça Cândido de Oliveira: 2007, 2008
- Taça da Liga: Runner-up 2007–08, 2008–09
- UEFA Cup: Runner-up 2004–05

Corinthians

- FIFA Club World Cup: 2012

Brazil

- FIFA World Cup: 2002

Individual

- Primeira Liga: Player of the Month May 2007
