= Rodrigo Tiuí =

Brazilian footballer

Personal information
- Full name: Rodrigo Bonifácio da Rocha
- Date of birth: 4 December 1985 (age 40)
- Place of birth: Taboão da Serra, Brazil
- Height: 1.77 m (5 ft 9 1/2 in)
- Position: Forward

Youth career
- 2001–2002: Fluminense

Senior career*
Years	Team	Apps	(Gls)
2003–2007	Fluminense	73	(11)
2006	→ Noroeste (loan)	20	(8)
2006	→ Santos (loan)	29	(6)
2008–2009	Sporting CP	14	(1)
2009	Atlético Paranaense	4	(0)
2010	Atlético Goianiense	11	(3)
2010–2012	Terek Grozny	16	(1)
2012	→ Náutico (loan)	1	(0)
2012	Criciúma	6	(1)
2013	Brasiliense		
2014	Linense	10	(3)
2014	Itumbiara		
2015	Gifu	18	(1)
2015	→ Fukushima United (loan)	8	(1)
2016–2017	Fukushima United		
2017	River-PI	0	(0)
2017–2018	Noroeste	6	(0)
2018–2019	Barra da Tijuca	7	(3)
2019	Uberaba		
- * Club domestic league appearances and goals

Rodrigo Bonifácio da Rocha (born 4 December 1985), nicknamed Tiuí, is a Brazilian former footballer who played as a forward.

== Football career ==
At Fluminense FC, Tiuí broke into the first team at the age of 18. In his first full season, he scored five goals in 18 Série A appearances, but only managed to find the net on three occasions the following campaign, having appeared in 29 league matches.

In 2006, Tiuí went on loan to Esporte Clube Noroeste from the Série C. He had another loan spell the same year with Santos FC, thus returning to the top level.

Tiuí signed with Sporting Clube de Portugal in January 2008, with the club buying half of the player's rights from C.A. Rentistas (his rights were in fact held by an investing company). His debut for the Lions came on 3 February in a 0–1 away loss to C.F. Os Belenenses; in one rare start, in the Lisbon derby against S.L. Benfica at home, he provided the assist in Simon Vukčević's goal as the derby finished 1–1 at the Estádio José Alvalade.

Tiuí scored his only Primeira Liga goal on 11 May 2008, against Boavista F.C. for the season's last matchday, with the 2–1 home win guaranteeing the second place and a direct qualifying position for the UEFA Champions League. A week later, he came from the bench at the beginning of extra time to net twice in the team's 2–0 final victory over FC Porto for the Taça de Portugal.

After an unassuming 2008–09 – only five matches in 79 minutes of play – Sporting exchanged 50% of its rights on Tiuí for the remaining 50% of Pedro Silva. On 20 September, the former signed a three-month contract with Clube Atlético Paranaense and, in January of the following year, the Uruguayans loaned him to Clube Atlético Goianiense; in August, he left for Russia's FC Terek Grozny in a 3+2 deal.

From then onwards, Tiuí competed in several levels of Brazilian football, with little impact. He also played in Japan, joining FC Gifu in early 2015 and switching to Fukushima United FC the following year.

== Honours ==
Sporting

- Taça de Portugal: 2007–08
- Supertaça Cândido de Oliveira: 2008

Atlético Goianiense

- Campeonato Goiano: 2010
