= João Vicente =

Cape Verdean footballer (born 1984)

Personal information
- Full name: João Carlos Rocha Vicente
- Date of birth: 3 July 1984 (age 42)
- Place of birth: Lisbon, Portugal
- Height: 1.77 m (5 ft 10 in)
- Position: Left back

Youth career
- 1994–1998: Vitória Lisboa
- 1998–1999: Atlético
- 1999–2001: Vitória Lisboa
- 2001–2003: Estrela Amadora

Senior career*
Years	Team	Apps	(Gls)
2003–2004	Tourizense		
2004–2005	Operário	28	(1)
2005–2006	Louletano	21	(1)
2006–2007	Imortal	25	(4)
2007–2008	Sertanense		
2008–2012	Moreirense	98	(4)
2012–2013	Arouca	24	(0)
2013–2014	Tondela	35	(0)
2014–2015	Chaves	19	(0)
2015–2016	União Leiria	28	(0)
2016–2018	Oriental	40	(1)

International career
2010	Cape Verde	1	(0)
- * Club domestic league appearances and goals as of 20 January 2019

João Carlos Rocha Vicente (born 3 July 1984 in Lisbon, Portugal) is a Cape Verdean professional footballer who plays as a left back.
