= Hugo Ventura =

Portuguese footballer

Personal information
- Full name: Hugo Ventura Ferreira Moura Guedes
- Date of birth: 14 January 1988 (age 38)
- Place of birth: Vila Nova de Gaia, Portugal
- Height: 1.84 m (6 ft 0 in)
- Position: Goalkeeper

Youth career
- 1998–2007: Porto

Senior career*
Years	Team	Apps	(Gls)
2007–2013	Porto	2	(0)
2009–2010	→ Olhanense (loan)	26	(0)
2010–2011	→ Portimonense (loan)	28	(1)
2011–2012	→ Olhanense (loan)	0	(0)
2013	→ Sporting CP (loan)	0	(0)
2013	→ Sporting CP B (loan)	4	(0)
2014	Rio Ave	2	(0)
2014–2017	Belenenses	59	(0)
Total		121	(0)

International career
2006–2007	Portugal U19	8	(0)
2006–2008	Portugal U20	5	(0)
2008–2010	Portugal U21	13	(0)
- * Club domestic league appearances and goals

Hugo Ventura Ferreira Moura Guedes (born 14 January 1988), known as Ventura, is a Portuguese former professional footballer who played as a goalkeeper.

== Club career ==
Born in Vila Nova de Gaia, Porto District, Ventura joined FC Porto's youth system at the age of 10. He only appeared in two Primeira Liga games during his tenure with the club, his debut occurring on 10 May 2008 in a 2–0 away win against Associação Naval 1º de Maio. Until the end of his contract, he was successively loaned to S.C. Olhanense (twice), Portimonense S.C. and Sporting CP; with Porto, he was also included in the main squad on 18 September 2007 in a 1–1 at home against Liverpool in the group stage of the UEFA Champions League and on 21 October of the following year for a 0–1 home defeat to FC Dynamo Kyiv in the same competition.

Late into the 2014 January transfer window, Ventura signed with Rio Ave F.C. also in the top division. In the summer he joined C.F. Os Belenenses of the same league, where he eventually beat competition from Englishman Matt Jones.

== International career ==
Ventura earned 37 caps for Portugal at youth level, including 13 for the under-21s. On 3 February 2011 he was called up for the first time to the full side by coach Paulo Bento for a friendly with Argentina in Geneva, Switzerland, receiving his second selection in March 2015 after being summoned by Fernando Santos ahead of a UEFA Euro 2016 qualifier against Serbia and being retained as an unused substitute later that month in a 2–0 defeat to Cape Verde in Estoril.

== Career statistics ==
As of match played on 22 March 2015

Club	Season	League			Cup		Other		Total	
Club	Season	Division	Apps	Goals	Apps	Goals	Apps	Goals	Apps	Goals
Porto	2007–08	Primeira Liga	1	0	0	0	0	0	1	0
Porto	2008–09	Primeira Liga	1	0	2	0	0	0	3	0
Porto	Total		2	0	2	0	0	0	4	0
Olhanense (loan)	2009–10	Primeira Liga	26	0	2	0	—		28	0
Portimonense (loan)	2010–11	Primeira Liga	28	1	1	0	—		29	1
Olhanense (loan)	2011–12	Primeira Liga	0	0	0	0	—		0	0
Sporting CP (loan)	2012–13	Primeira Liga	0	0	0	0	—		0	0
Rio Ave	2013–14	Primeira Liga	2	0	1	0	—		3	0
Belenenses	2014–15	Primeira Liga	11	0	3	0	—		14	0
Career total			69	1	9	0	0	0	78	1

== Honours ==
Porto

- Primeira Liga: 2007–08, 2008–09
- Taça de Portugal: 2008–09
