= Cláudio Pitbull =

Brazilian footballer (born 1982)

Personal information
- Full name: Cláudio Mejolaro
- Date of birth: 8 January 1982 (age 44)
- Place of birth: Porto Alegre, Brazil
- Height: 1.73 m (5 ft 8 in)
- Position: Forward

Team information
- Current team: Cabofriense

Youth career
- 1997–1999: Grêmio

Senior career*
Years	Team	Apps	(Gls)
1999–2004	Grêmio	84	(22)
2002	→ Juventude (loan)	20	(6)
2005–2010	Porto	5	(0)
2005–2006	→ Ittihad (loan)		
2005	→ Santos (loan)	11	(2)
2006	→ Fluminense (loan)	23	(2)
2006–2007	→ Académica (loan)	9	(1)
2007–2008	→ Vitória Setúbal (loan)	25	(7)
2008–2009	→ Rapid București (loan)	18	(1)
2009–2010	→ Marítimo (loan)	15	(1)
2010–2012	Vitória Setúbal	38	(9)
2012	Manisaspor	4	(0)
2012	Bahia	7	(1)
2013–2014	Gil Vicente	2	(0)
2018–	Cabofriense		
- * Club domestic league appearances and goals as of 1 June 2014

Cláudio Mejolaro (born 8 January 1982), commonly known as Pitbull, is a Brazilian professional footballer who plays as a forward for Associação Desportiva Cabofriense.

== Career ==
After fine displays at Grêmio Foot-Ball Porto Alegrense, Pitbull was acquired by Portugal's FC Porto in the January 2005 transfer window. Unable to settle with the club, he was loaned several times for the duration of his contract, mainly in that country.

On 4 February 2007, Pitbull played his first Primeira Liga match with Académica de Coimbra, against Associação Naval 1º de Maio. For the 2007–08 season he was loaned again, this time to Vitória de Setúbal, where he was the team's top scorer as they overachieved despite facing serious financial problems; in March 2008, he helped the Sadinos to win the newly created League Cup in a penalty shootout against Sporting Clube de Portugal, also being named the tournament's best player.

In July 2008, alongside teammate João Paulo Andrade, Pitbull was loaned to Romanian side FC Rapid București, on a season-long move. After that sole Liga I campaign he returned to Portugal, being loaned for the seventh time by Porto, to C.S. Marítimo.

Pitbull returned to Setúbal for a second spell in 2010–11, scoring nine goals in 26 games to help the team again avoid relegation. In late January 2012 he switched clubs and countries again, joining Manisaspor in the Turkish Süper Lig.

== Honours ==
Grêmio

- Copa do Brasil: 2001

Setúbal

- Taça da Liga: 2007–08
