= Paulo Bento =

Portuguese football manager (born 1969)

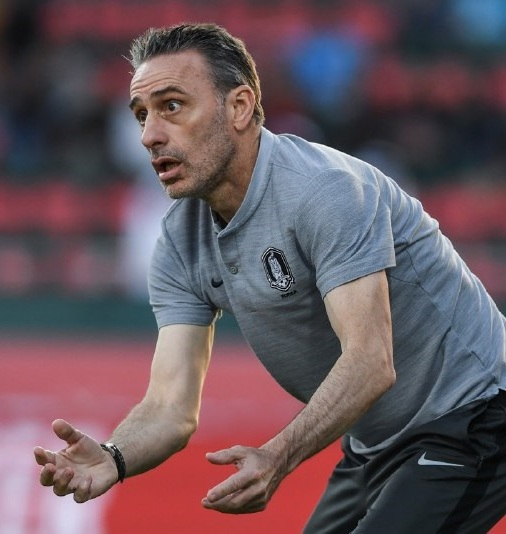
- Bento coaching South Korea at the 2019 Asian Cup

Personal information
- Full name: Paulo Jorge Gomes Bento
- Date of birth: 20 June 1969 (age 57)
- Place of birth: Lisbon, Portugal
- Height: 1.74 m (5 ft 9 in)
- Position: Defensive midfielder

Youth career
- 1982–1987: Académico Alvalade
- 1987–1988: Palmense

Senior career*
Years	Team	Apps	(Gls)
1988–1989	Futebol Benfica	20	(2)
1989–1991	Estrela Amadora	37	(0)
1991–1994	Vitória Guimarães	95	(13)
1994–1996	Benfica	49	(2)
1996–2000	Oviedo	136	(4)
2000–2004	Sporting CP	103	(2)
Total		440	(23)

International career
1992–2002	Portugal	35	(0)

Managerial career
- 2004–2005: Sporting CP (youth)
- 2005–2009: Sporting CP
- 2010–2014: Portugal
- 2016: Cruzeiro
- 2016–2017: Olympiacos
- 2017–2018: Chongqing Lifan
- 2018–2022: South Korea
- 2023–2025: United Arab Emirates
Medal record
Men's football
Representing Portugal (as player)
UEFA European Championship
Bronze medal – third place	2000 Belgium/Netherlands
Representing South Korea (as manager)
EAFF Championship
Winner	2019 South Korea
- * Club domestic league appearances and goals

Paulo Jorge Gomes Bento (Portuguese pronunciation: [ˈpawlu ˈbẽtu]; born 20 June 1969) is a Portuguese football manager and former player.

A defensive midfielder with tackling ability and workrate as his main assets, he played for two of the major three teams in his country, amassing Primeira Liga totals of 284 matches and 16 goals over 11 seasons, and also spent four years in Spain with Real Oviedo. He represented the Portugal national team in the 2002 World Cup and Euro 2000.

Bento took up a coaching career in 2005, managing Sporting CP for four years and four months, with relative success, and won a Super League Greece title with Olympiacos. He managed the national teams of his country and South Korea for four years apiece, taking each team to a World Cup and continental tournament. In 2023, he was appointed at United Arab Emirates.

== Playing career ==
Born in Lisbon, Bento played professionally in his homeland for Estrela da Amadora, Vitória de Guimarães and Benfica, and had a four-year abroad spell with Real Oviedo, helping the Spanish club always retain its La Liga status before moving to Sporting CP, where he finished his career. With the latter, he was part of the star-studded team that achieved the double in 2002 under the direction of Laszlo Bölöni, contributing 31 games and one goal in the Primeira Liga and playing alongside Mário Jardel and João Pinto among others.

Bento earned 35 caps for the Portugal national team, debuting on 15 January 1992 in a 0–0 draw with Spain and making his last appearance in the 1–0 loss to South Korea on 14 June 2002 in the FIFA World Cup. He also played at UEFA Euro 2000 where, along with teammates Abel Xavier – who played with him at Oviedo for two seasons – and Nuno Gomes, he was suspended (in Bento's case for five months) due to bad behaviour, during the semi-final defeat against France.

== Coaching career ==
=== Sporting CP ===
After an emotional 2004 retirement, aged 35, Bento got the job of Sporting's youth team coach. He won the junior championship in 2005, and developed a base to the future. After the sacking of José Peseiro midway through 2005–06 season, he was promoted to first-team duties in spite of being relatively inexperienced.

Despite a slow start, Bento managed an impressive turnaround of Sporting's fortunes in the second half of the campaign, as a series of ten consecutive wins placed them within distance of leaders and eventual league champions Porto, as the former went on to rank second in that and the following seasons, achieving direct qualification for the UEFA Champions League. He was responsible for bringing youth products Nani, João Moutinho and Miguel Veloso into the spotlight.

Bento signed a new two-year contract in June 2007. His side had a turbulent pre-season in preparation for 2007–08, with defense mainstays Rodrigo Tello and Marco Caneira leaving the club while Portuguese international goalkeeper Ricardo was sold to Real Betis. With little resources to invest, the club brought Eastern promises – Marat Izmailov, Vladimir Stojković and Simon Vukčević – aboard.

After a very irregular season, Bento managed to lead the team to an unprecedented third consecutive qualification for the Champions League, with another second-place finish in spite of spending most of the year below third, pipping Guimarães and Benfica in the final matchday. He also retained the Taça de Portugal, beating Porto in the final (2–0 after extra time) after knocking-out eternal rivals Benfica in the last-four stage with a 5–3 win.

Bento's team broke a number of long-standing club records, including the first season without home defeats since 1987, the first capture of back-to-back Portuguese cups since 1974 and the first time since 1962 that Sporting finished three consecutive campaigns in the top two league positions. At the age of 38, he also became only the sixth manager in the history of Portuguese football to win back-to-back Portuguese cups, alongside the likes of János Biri, John Mortimore or José Maria Pedroto.

On 15 July 2008, The Sun and The Daily Telegraph reported that Manchester United were planning to hire Bento (reportedly Cristiano Ronaldo's friend and former teammate) as manager Alex Ferguson's new assistant after the departure of previous number two Carlos Queiroz to manage the Portugal national team. He quickly denied any speculation, and reaffirmed his intention to stay put.

On 16 August 2008, Bento managed Sporting to a 2–0 victory in the Supertaça Cândido de Oliveira over champions Porto, at the opening of the new season. One of the players that were kept in the team despite heavy criticism, Rui Patrício, was a key element and saved a penalty from Lucho González during the second half; this win raised the manager's tally in cup finals against counterpart Jesualdo Ferreira to 3–0 (2007 and 2008 Supercups, and the 2008 Portuguese Cup), and it also marked the first ever capture of back-to-back Portuguese Supercups in the Lions' history.

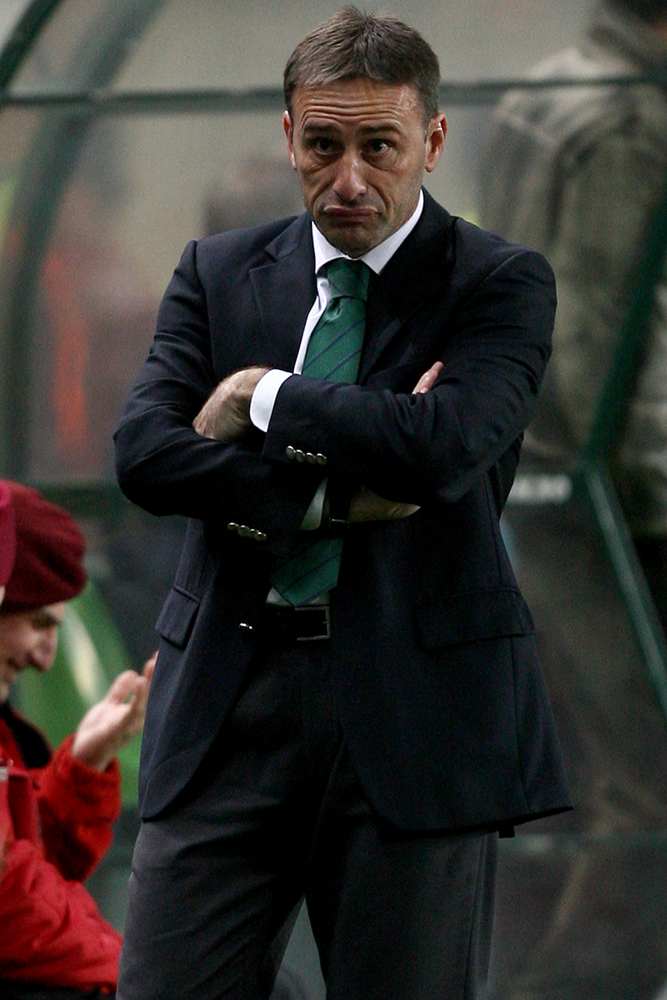
Bento as Sporting CP manager in 2009

Already the second-most successful coach in the history of the club in terms of trophies won, only surpassed by József Szabó, Bento gained the nickname "Cup-Eater" as a consequence of the four pieces of silverware added to the Estádio José Alvalade cabinet under his command. He led his team to a 1–0 home defeat of Shakhtar Donetsk on 4 November 2008, therefore mathematically securing automatic qualification for the knockout stages of the Champions League for the first time in their history; in the process, they also broke the club's record number of points in UEFA's main competition (nine) and remarkably did so with two matches to spare, becoming the first team to qualify from the group phase (alongside Barcelona, from the same group).

Later, Bento and Sporting also broke the record for most goals suffered by a team in a Champions League knockout round, following a 12–1 aggregate elimination at the hands of Bayern Munich in the round of 16. In the league, another second place to Porto befell, with the season also featuring the controversial Taça da Liga final loss against Benfica, on penalties.

That Champions League ousting marked the beginning of fan discontent towards Bento, especially regarding the team's playing style, which was perceived as becoming dull and unattractive, as presidential elections were to be held. Supported by the winning candidate José Eduardo Bettencourt, he signed a two-year contract extension; in spite of maintaining the same base squad and adding the talent of Felipe Caicedo or Matías Fernández, Sporting was unable to start the new campaign brightly: knocked out in the Champions League playoff round by Fiorentina on away goals, the side's form slumped quickly and after nine matches they found themselves mired in seventh place, 12 points behind leaders Braga.

After a 1–1 home draw in the Europa League group stage against Ventspils on 5 November 2009, and facing considerable pressure to step down, Bento resigned.

=== Portugal ===
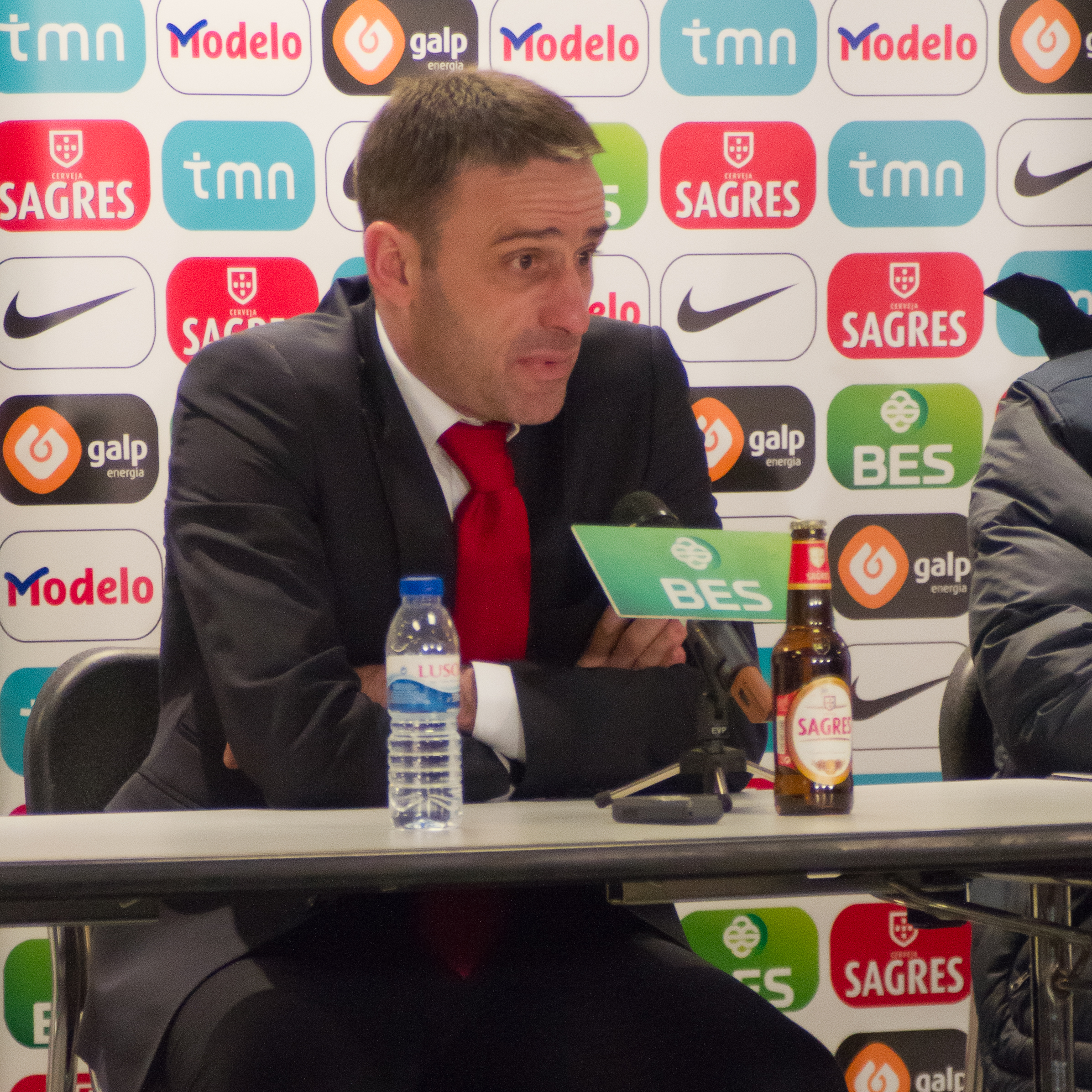
Bento at a press conference in 2011

On 20 September 2010, following Queiroz's dismissal after a poor start to the Euro 2012 qualifying campaign, Bento was named his successor, initially until the last match of that stage. His first game in charge was on 8 October, a 3–1 win against Denmark in Porto.

On 17 November 2010, Portugal defeated World Cup champions Spain 4–0 in Lisbon, imposing the largest loss to its Iberian neighbours since 13 June 1963 (6–2 against Scotland, in another friendly). He led the national team to the Euro 2012 semi-finals in Poland and Ukraine, where they narrowly lost to eventual champions Spain on penalties.

Bento led Portugal to a 4–2 aggregate victory over Sweden in the playoffs after a second-place finish in the 2014 World Cup qualifiers, securing a spot at the finals in Brazil. On 9 April 2014, he extended his contract until after Euro 2016, but the national team exited in the World Cup's group stage in spite of a 2–1 win against Ghana in the last match, with the United States progressing on goal difference instead.

On 11 September 2014, after the Euro 2016 qualifying campaign began with a 0–1 home defeat to Albania, the Portuguese Football Federation announced Bento had been fired.

=== Cruzeiro ===
Bento moved abroad for the first time in his managerial career on 11 May 2016, taking the helm at Brazil's Cruzeiro. His first game, ten days later, was a 2–2 draw at home to Figueirense which continued his side's winless start to the season.

On 25 July 2016, Bento resigned from the club following a 1–2 home loss against Sport Recife.

=== Olympiacos ===
On 11 August 2016, Bento became the head coach of Super League Greece title holders Olympiacos. He was sacked on 6 March 2017 with the team seven points clear at the top of the table and qualified for the semi-finals of the domestic cup and last 16 of the Europa League, mainly due to a string of poor performances in official competitions, a three-game losing streak in the league with no goals scored and various press conference comments targeting the "weakness" of certain squad members and the roster as a whole.

=== Chongqing Dangdai Lifan ===
On 11 December 2017, Bento was appointed manager at Chongqing Dangdai Lifan. The following 22 July, he was relieved of his duties due to poor results.

=== South Korea ===
On 17 August 2018, Bento was appointed manager of South Korea, with a contract to include the 2022 World Cup; he stated he would focus on 'proactive-style football' as his main strategy, emphasizing on Korea's longer communication of shorter passes and maintaining bigger possession and forwarding skills, which was considered a more unusual style of play as the team was previously used to playing defensively. At the 2019 AFC Asian Cup in the United Arab Emirates, the side were eliminated 1–0 in the quarter-finals by eventual champions Qatar.

Bento led his team to the 2019 EAFF E-1 Football Championship after a 1–0 defeat of Japan. This marked the third time they won the tournament, this being the second consecutive victory over that opposition.

On 1 February 2022, with a 2–0 away win over Syria, the Bento-led Taegeuk Warriors qualified for that year's World Cup, the nation's tenth consecutive edition. On 23 November, in the finals in Qatar, he was booked in the group-stage fixture against Uruguay for dissent near the end of the 0–0 draw. In the next match, a 3–2 loss to Ghana, he was shown a red card for arguing with referee Anthony Taylor after the final whistle. Having qualified for the round of 16 for the first time in 12 years with a 2–1 victory over his native Portugal, he lost 4–1 to Brazil and left his post shortly after, stating he wanted to take a break and that the decision was made in September; he added he was proud of the team's accomplishments, and felt the squad was one of the best groups he had worked with.

=== United Arab Emirates ===
On 9 July 2023, Bento replaced Rodolfo Arruabarrena at the helm of the United Arab Emirates national side. He won 4–1 on his debut on 12 September, a friendly against Costa Rica in Zagreb.

Bento and his staff were dismissed by the United Arab Emirates Football Association on 26 March 2025, in spite of a 2–1 away defeat of North Korea in the World Cup qualifiers.

== Career statistics ==
=== Club ===
Appearances and goals by club, season and competition
Club	Season	League		Cup		Europe		Other (Note: Includes Supertaça Cândido de Oliveira)		Total	
Club	Season	Apps	Goals	Apps	Goals	Apps	Goals	Apps	Goals	Apps	Goals
Futebol Benfica	1988–89	20	2			—				20	0
Estrela Amadora	1989–90	12	0			—				12	0
Estrela Amadora	1990–91	25	0			4	0	2	0	31	0
Estrela Amadora	Total	37	0			4	0	2	0	43	0
Vitória Guimarães	1991–92	32	3			—				32	3
Vitória Guimarães	1992–93	31	5			3	0	—		34	4
Vitória Guimarães	1993–94	32	5	2	0	—				34	5
Vitória Guimarães	Total	95	13	2	0	3	0	—		100	13
Benfica	1994–95	20	0	4	0	3	0	1	0	28	0
Benfica	1995–96	29	2	6	0	5	1	—		40	3
Benfica	Total	49	2	10	0	8	1	1	0	68	3
Oviedo	1996–97	30	2	4	1	—				34	3
Oviedo	1997–98	36	0	2	0	—				38	0
Oviedo	1998–99	34	0			—				34	0
Oviedo	1999–00	36	2			—				36	2
Oviedo	Total	136	4	6	1	—				142	5
Sporting CP	2000–01	32	0	2	0	0	0	3	0	37	0
Sporting CP	2001–02	31	1	4	0	5	1	—		40	2
Sporting CP	2002–03	29	1	2	0	2	0	1	0	34	1
Sporting CP	2003–04	11	0	2	0	1	0	—		14	0
Sporting CP	Total	103	2	10	0	8	1	4	0	125	3
Career total		440	23	28	1	23	2	7	0	498	26

== Managerial statistics ==
As of match played 25 March 2025

Managerial record by team and tenure
Team	From	To	Record							
Team	From	To	Pld	W	D	L	GF	GA	GD	Win %
Sporting CP	21 October 2005	5 November 2009	194	117	46	31	311	152	+159	60.31
Portugal	21 September 2010	11 September 2014	47	26	12	9	91	49	+42	55.32
Cruzeiro	11 May 2016	25 July 2016	17	6	3	8	23	28	−5	35.29
Olympiacos	11 August 2016	6 March 2017	40	26	8	6	69	22	+47	65.00
Chongqing Lifan	11 December 2017	22 July 2018	15	5	2	8	20	20	+0	33.33
South Korea	17 August 2018	5 December 2022	57	35	13	9	100	46	+54	61.40
United Arab Emirates	9 July 2023	26 March 2025	26	14	6	6	48	22	+26	53.85
Total			396	229	90	77	662	339	+323	57.83

== Honours ==
=== Player ===
Estrela Amadora

- Taça de Portugal: 1989–90

Benfica

- Taça de Portugal: 1995–96

Sporting CP

- Primeira Liga: 2001–02
- Taça de Portugal: 2001–02
- Supertaça Cândido de Oliveira: 2000, 2002

=== Manager ===
Sporting CP

- Taça de Portugal: 2006–07, 2007–08
- Supertaça Cândido de Oliveira: 2007, 2008
- Taça da Liga runner-up: 2007–08, 2008–09

Olympiacos

- Super League Greece: 2016–17

South Korea

- EAFF Championship: 2019

Individual

- CNID Breakthrough Coach: 2005–06
- Korean FA Coach of the Year: 2022

== See also ==
- National team managers with 100 or more matches
