= Leandro Lima (footballer, born 1985) =

Brazilian footballer

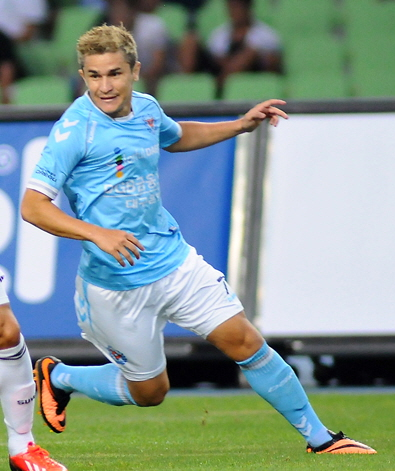

Personal information
- Full name: Luiz Leandro Abreu de Lima
- Date of birth: 9 November 1985 (age 41)
- Place of birth: Fortaleza, Brazil
- Height: 1.69 m (5 ft 7 in)
- Position: Winger

Team information
- Current team: Paysandu

Youth career
- 2004: Real Salvador
- 2005–2006: São Caetano

Senior career*
Years	Team	Apps	(Gls)
2006–2007	São Caetano	24	(4)
2007–2010	Porto	8	(0)
2008–2009	→ Vitória Setúbal (loan)	24	(0)
2009–2010	→ Cruzeiro (loan)	8	(1)
2010–2011	União Leiria	22	(1)
2011	Avaí	9	(0)
2012–2013	Daegu	50	(5)
2014–2015	Jeonnam Dragons	50	(4)
2016	Santa Cruz	5	(0)
2016–2017	Fortaleza	16	(1)
2018	Juventude	27	(0)
2019–	Paysandu	8	(0)

International career
2007	Brazil U20	12	(4)
- * Club domestic league appearances and goals as of 23 July 2019

Luiz Leandro Abreu de Lima (born 9 November 1985), known as Leandro Lima or Leandrinho, is a Brazilian professional footballer who plays for Paysandu Sport Club as a winger.

== Club career ==
Lima was born in Fortaleza, Ceará. After making his professional debut with Associação Desportiva São Caetano, he went on to represent Brazil at both the 2007 FIFA U-20 World Cup and the 2007 South American U-20 Championship, helping the national side to the conquest of the latter tournament.

In July 2007, Lima signed a five-year contract with Portugal's FC Porto. He struggled heavily in his first season and, furthermore, was later involved in a false documentation incident after it was revealed that he had not been born on 19 December 1987, as initially registered (he was also "named" Luis Leandro Abreu de Lima in the initial procedures).

Lima spent the entire 2008–09 campaign on loan to fellow Primeira Liga club Vitória de Setúbal, helping the sadinos barely avoid relegation. On 17 July 2009 he was once again loaned, returning to Brazil with Cruzeiro Esporte Clube.

In late April 2010, after Cruzeiro were eliminated from the Copa Libertadores by fellow Brazilians São Paulo FC, Lima was released alongside eight teammates. In late August he returned to Portugal, agreeing to a two-year deal at U.D. Leiria.

Lima returned to Brazil on 7 July 2011, joining Série A team Avaí FC. After appearing in only nine matches and suffering relegation, he was released.

Lima signed with K League's Daegu FC on 19 January 2012, leaving at the end of the season but returning shortly after. In 2014, after being relegated, he moved to fellow league club Jeonnam Dragons.
