= Simon Vukčević =

Montenegrin footballer (born 1986)

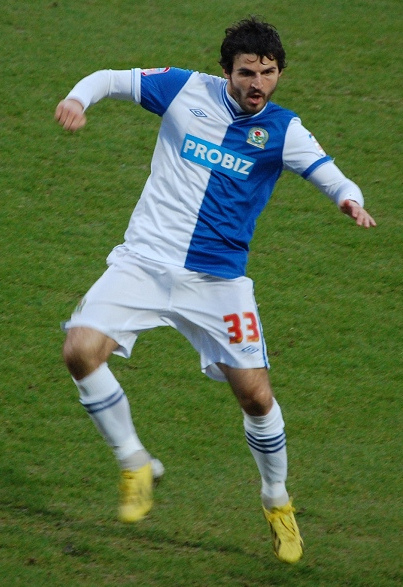
- Vukčević playing for Blackburn Rovers in 2013

Personal information
- Full name: Simon Vukčević
- Date of birth: 29 January 1986 (age 40)
- Place of birth: Titograd, SFR Yugoslavia
- Height: 1.79 m (5 ft 10 in)
- Position: Midfielder

Youth career
- Zabjelo
- 1999–2003: Partizan

Senior career*
| Years | Team | Apps | (Gls) |
| 2003–2006 | Partizan | 52 | (13) |
| 2006–2007 | Saturn | 28 | (1) |
| 2007–2011 | Sporting CP | 77 | (14) |
| 2011–2013 | Blackburn Rovers | 16 | (1) |
| 2013 | Karpaty Lviv | 2 | (0) |
| 2013 | Vojvodina | 10 | (0) |
| 2014–2015 | Levadiakos | 25 | (2) |
| 2015–2016 | Enosis Neon | 15 | (1) |
| 2016–2017 | Chaves | 11 | (0) |
| 2018 | Budućnost | 0 | (0) |
| Total | | 241 | (32) |

International career
| 2004–2006 | Serbia and Montenegro U21 | 12 | (2) |
| 2004 | Serbia and Montenegro U23 | 3 | (1) |
| 2004–2005 | Serbia and Montenegro | 5 | (0) |
| 2007 | Montenegro U21 | 2 | (1) |
| 2007–2014 | Montenegro | 45 | (2) |
Medal record
Men's football
Representing Serbia and Montenegro
UEFA European Under-21 Championship
| Runner-up | 2004 Germany |
- * Club domestic league appearances and goals

Simon Vukčević (Montenegrin Cyrillic: Симон Вукчевић, pronounced [sǐmon ʋǔktʃeʋitɕ]; born 29 January 1986) is a Montenegrin former footballer who played as an attacking midfielder.

After starting his senior career at the age of 17 with Partizan, winning two national championships during his tenure, he went on to play professionally in Russia, Portugal – playing 135 competitive matches while scoring 28 goals for Sporting CP and conquering the 2008 Taça de Portugal – England, Ukraine, Greece and Cyprus.

Internationally, Vukčević represented both Serbia and Montenegro and Montenegro.

== Club career ==
=== Partizan ===
Born in Titograd, Socialist Republic of Montenegro, Socialist Federal Republic of Yugoslavia, Vukčević started playing football at the FK Zabjelo youth academy, signing with FK Partizan at age 13. He was promoted to the first team of the latter ahead of the 2003–04 season.

The 18-year-old Vukčević scored a career-best ten goals in the 2004–05 campaign, helping his team win the eighth First League of Serbia and Montenegro in their history and 19th overall. He was eventually awarded the number 1 shirt in recognition of his popularity among supporters but, during 2005–06, faced criticism over his excessive individual play and poor shot selection, as well as overall declining form.

=== Saturn ===
In January 2006, Vukčević joined FC Saturn Ramenskoye for a reported fee of €7 million. In late July, however, he was demoted to the reserve squad with coach Vladimír Weiss publicly blasting him in the press for displaying bad attitude in training and having a lack of manners.

Subsequently, Vukčević expressed frustration at his manager playing him out of position. He also said that coming to the Russian Premier League club was a mistake, and that he would have preferred a more ambitious project.

Vukčević's fate did not change for the better even though Weiss was dismissed early into the 2007 season, being replaced by Gadzhi Gadzhiev,

=== Sporting ===
On 25 June 2007, Saturn reportedly agreed a €4 million transfer fee with Sporting CP, but the deal stalled when the former also demanded 20% of any subsequent transfer fees involving Vukčević. Three days later, both clubs agreed a €2 million fee in addition to an agreement about splitting his future transfer fee 50–50. He made his Primeira Liga debut on 17 August, playing 71 minutes in a 4–1 home win over Académica de Coimbra.

Vukčević also found the net in home fixtures against FC Porto (2–0) and S.L. Benfica (1–1) in his first year. He ranked second in the team in goals scored at seven, only behind Liédson.

During the 2008 summer transfer window, Bolton Wanderers and Blackburn Rovers were at the top of the list of clubs reportedly interested in signing Vukčević; nonetheless, Sporting reiterated their desire to keep the player. Shortly after, he got involved in a controversial dispute with manager Paulo Bento over losing his place in the starting XI; after playing 45 minutes as a substitute in the 2–0 home defeat of C.F. Os Belenenses, he declared his intention to leave the Estádio José Alvalade.

On 21 November 2008, without any warning, Vukčević missed training to join his national team one day before expected, being fined €5,000 and placed on individual training until further notice. On 29 November, after holding a press conference stating his wish to remain in Sporting and apologising for his behaviour, he was allowed to train with the rest of the team. On 5 December, after coming on for Hélder Postiga in the 75th minute of the league game at C.F. Estrela da Amadora, he scored shortly after in a 3–1 victory.

Sporting bought the remaining 50% rights on a future transfer from Saturn in January 2010, for another £2 million.

=== Blackburn Rovers ===
Vukčević agreed to a three-year contract with Blackburn Rovers on 26 August 2011, after a successful medical. His maiden Premier League appearance took place on 17 September when he played 25 minutes in a 4–3 home win against Arsenal at Ewood Park, and he scored his first goal three days later in a 3–2 victory over Leyton Orient in the third round of the League Cup, also at home. His first league goal came on 11 December, in a 2–1 loss away to Sunderland; he made little impact during his first season, and his team was relegated.

With the Rovers back in the Championship, Vukčević made his first start of the campaign on 28 August 2012, playing the full 90 minutes in a 1–2 defeat against Milton Keynes Dons in the second round of the League Cup. It seemed likely that he would be allowed to leave on loan with a view to a permanent deal, but in the first match under new coach Henning Berg, on 3 November against Crystal Palace, he took the field after replacing Marcus Olsson.

Over the next few months, Vukčević made more first-team appearances and was even chosen by new manager Michael Appleton. On 31 January 2013, however, his contract was terminated with immediate effect by mutual consent, with the player having played 21 games across all competitions. Shortly before this happened, there were reports he would move to APOEL FC of the Cypriot First Division, but no deal was reached.

=== Karpaty Lviv ===
On 28 February 2013, Vukčević signed a contract with Ukrainian Premier League club FC Karpaty Lviv until 30 June with the option to extend. His first appearance occurred three days later, when he played eight minutes in a 2–0 away win over SC Tavriya Simferopol.

Vukčević left in April 2013 by mutual consent, citing personal reasons.

=== Later years ===
On 10 August 2013, Vukčević joined Serbian SuperLiga's FK Vojvodina. In the following years he failed to settle at any club or country, representing Levadiakos FC (Super League Greece), Enosis Neon Paralimni FC (Cypriot top level) and G.D. Chaves (Portuguese top tier).

On 30 March 2018, 32-year-old Vukčević announced his retirement.

== International career ==
=== Youth ===
Vukčević was part of the FR Yugoslavia under-17 squad at the 2002 UEFA European Championship. At age 18, he was selected by head coach Vladimir Petrović to be part of the Serbia and Montenegro under-21 team at the 2004 European Championships, scoring for the eventual runners-up in a 1–2 group stage loss to Italy and also converting his penalty shootout attempt in the semi-finals against Sweden. He participated in the Summer Olympic Games also that year, and was subsequently honoured with the Golden Badge Award for the Best Young Athlete of the Year in Serbia and Montenegro by DSL Sport.

Vukčević also played for the under-21 side in the 2006 European Championship. After a 0–1 defeat against Germany in the group phase opener, manager Dragan Okuka dropped him from the first team.

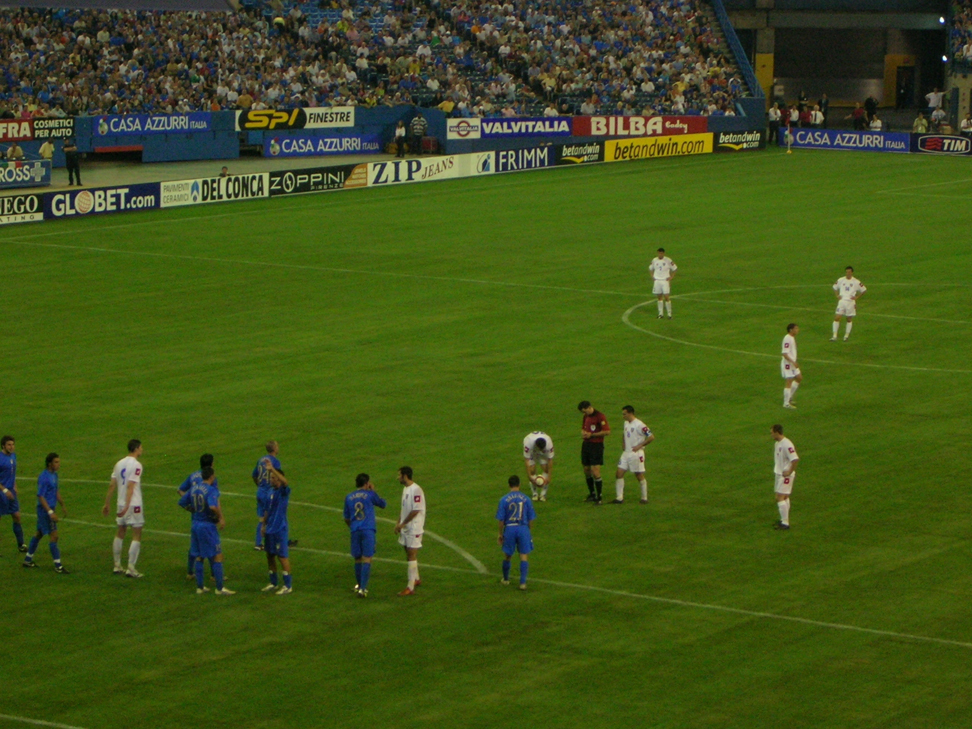
Vukčević lining up a free kick for Serbia and Montenegro in a friendly in Toronto versus Italy in 2005

=== Senior ===
Vukčević began earning call-ups to the Serbia and Montenegro senior team from Ilija Petković. His debut came on 11 July 2004 against Slovakia at the age of 18, when he replaced Saša Ilić late into the 2–0 win for the Kirin Cup.

On 4 June 2005, Vukčević was given his competitive debut, when he came in for Ognjen Koroman for the last eight minutes of the 0–0 home draw to Belgium for the 2006 FIFA World Cup qualifiers. His last appearance for Serbia and Montenegro occurred four days later, when he featured the entire 1–1 friendly draw with Italy at Toronto's Rogers Centre.

After Montenegro seceded from Serbia and Montenegro in June 2006, Vukčević chose to represent the newly created nation. He won his first cap on 24 March 2007, in a 2–1 friendly defeat of Hungary. He scored the first of two international goals on 20 August of the following year, helping to a 3–3 draw against the same opposition in another exhibition game.

Vukčević played a total of 45 internationals.

== Personal life ==
Vukčević's father, Ilija, worked as director of football at FK Zeta.

== Career statistics ==
=== Club ===
| Club | Season | League | | Cup | | Europe | | Total |
| Club | Season | App | Goals | App | Goals | App | Goals | App | Goals |
|---|---|---|---|---|---|---|---|---|---|
| Partizan | 2002–03 | 1 | 0 | 0 | 0 | 0 | 0 | 1 | 0 |
| Partizan | 2003–04 | 12 | 0 | 2 | 0 | 0 | 0 | 14 | 0 |
| Partizan | 2004–05 | 26 | 10 | 3 | 0 | 11 | 1 | 40 | 11 |
| Partizan | 2005–06 | 13 | 3 | 2 | 0 | 6 | 1 | 21 | 4 |
| Saturn | 2006 | 24 | 0 | 8 | 1 | 0 | 0 | 32 | 1 |
| Saturn | 2007 | 4 | 1 | 2 | 0 | 0 | 0 | 6 | 1 |
| Sporting | 2007–08 | 26 | 7 | 10 | 4 | 11 | 3 | 47 | 14 |
| Sporting | 2008–09 | 13 | 4 | 5 | 2 | 4 | 0 | 22 | 6 |
| Sporting | 2009–10 | 14 | 1 | 4 | 1 | 9 | 1 | 27 | 3 |
| Sporting | 2010–11 | 24 | 2 | 3 | 0 | 7 | 3 | 34 | 5 |
| Blackburn Rovers | 2011–12 | 7 | 1 | 3 | 1 | 0 | 0 | 10 | 2 |
| Blackburn Rovers | 2012–13 | 9 | 0 | 2 | 0 | 0 | 0 | 11 | 0 |
| Karpaty Lviv | 2012–13 | 2 | 0 | 0 | 0 | 0 | 0 | 2 | 0 |
| Vojvodina | 2013–14 | 10 | 0 | 1 | 0 | 2 | 0 | 13 | 0 |
| Levadiakos | 2014–15 | 25 | 2 | 4 | 0 | 0 | 0 | 29 | 2 |
| Enosis Neon | 2015–16 | 15 | 1 | 0 | 0 | 0 | 0 | 15 | 1 |
| Chaves | 2016–17 | 11 | 0 | 1 | 0 | 0 | 0 | 12 | 0 |
| Career total | | 236 | 32 | 52 | 9 | 50 | 9 | 336 | 50 |

=== International goals ===
| # | Date | Venue | Opponent | Score | Result | Competition |
|---|---|---|---|---|---|---|
| 1. | 20 August 2008 | Ferenc Puskás, Budapest, Hungary | Hungary | 3–3 | 3–3 | Friendly |
| 2. | 25 March 2011 | City Stadium, Podgorica, Montenegro | Uzbekistan | 1–0 | 1–0 | Friendly |

== Honours ==
Partizan

- First League of Serbia and Montenegro: 2002–03, 2004–05

Sporting

- Taça de Portugal: 2007–08

Vojvodina

- Serbian Cup: 2013–14

Awards
| Preceded by Nemanja Aleksandrov | The Best Young Athlete of Serbia and Montenegro; 2004 | Succeeded by Žarko Šešum |
