= João Paulo (footballer, born June 1981) =

Portuguese footballer (born 1981)

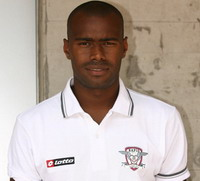

Personal information
- Full name: João Paulo Andrade
- Date of birth: 6 June 1981 (age 45)
- Place of birth: Leiria, Portugal
- Height: 1.80 m (5 ft 11 in)
- Position: Centre-back

Youth career
- 1992–1994: Portomosense
- 1994–1999: União Leiria

Senior career*
| Years | Team | Apps | (Gls) |
| 1999–2006 | União Leiria | 131 | (16) |
| 2000–2001 | → União Tomar (loan) | | |
| 2003 | → Sporting CP (loan) | 6 | (0) |
| 2006–2009 | Porto | 11 | (1) |
| 2008–2009 | → Rapid București (loan) | 26 | (3) |
| 2009–2010 | Le Mans | 23 | (0) |
| 2010–2012 | Vitória Guimarães | 45 | (1) |
| 2012–2014 | Omonia | 43 | (6) |
| 2014–2015 | Apollon Limassol | 19 | (3) |
| 2015–2016 | AEL Limassol | 28 | (1) |
| 2017–2019 | Marinhense | 48 | (5) |
| 2019–2024 | Castrense | 80 | (17) |
| Total | | 460 | (53) |

International career
| 2002–2004 | Portugal U21 | 12 | (1) |
| 2004 | Portugal U23 | 1 | (0) |
| 2004–2005 | Portugal B | 3 | (0) |
Medal record
Men's football
Representing Portugal
UEFA European Under-21 Championship
| Third place | 2004 Germany |
- * Club domestic league appearances and goals

João Paulo Andrade (born 6 June 1981), known as João Paulo, is a Portuguese former professional footballer who played mainly as a central defender.

He amassed Primeira Liga totals of 193 matches and 18 goals over nine seasons, almost all while at the service of União de Leiria (five years). He also played in Romania, France and Cyprus.

== Club career ==
A product of U.D. Leiria's youth academy, Leiria-born João Paulo was loaned to modest U.F.C.I. Tomar for 2000–01, re-joining Leiria the following season, being coached by a young José Mourinho and quickly becoming an important first-team member, while also being called by the Portugal under-21 side. In January 2003, having already gained the captain's armband, he was loaned to Sporting CP, but appeared sparingly for them.

After having performed solidly during the last two seasons, João Paulo was tipped to be transferred to one of the Primeira Liga greats and, in June 2006, FC Porto agreed his transfer. However, in preseason, he suffered a major knee injury that kept him out of action for several months, and went on to only serve as third or fourth option at the northerners; on two rare starts, he netted in a 3–0 win at his former club Leiria and was sent off in the 2008 final of the Taça de Portugal, lost against Sporting.

In July 2008 João Paulo, alongside teammate Cláudio Pitbull, was loaned to Romania's FC Rapid București, joining compatriot José Peseiro whom signed as manager. In August of the following year he moved countries again, signing a three-year deal with Le Mans UC 72 in France for about €1,5 million. He began the campaign as a starter, but eventually lost his importance after the sacking of compatriot Paulo Duarte, going on to suffer Ligue 1 relegation.

João Paulo returned to Portugal for 2010–11, joining Vitória SC. On 3 April 2011 he scored his first goal for the Guimarães-based team, netting a last-minute equaliser against his former side Sporting in a 1–1 home draw.

On 2 March 2017, after four seasons in the Cypriot First Division in representation of three clubs, the 35-year-old João Paulo returned to his homeland and joined amateurs A.C. Marinhense, where he played mainly as a forward.

== International career ==
Of Cape Verdean descent, João Paulo represented Portugal at the 2004 UEFA European Under-21 Championship and the Summer Olympic Games the same year. He also played for the nation's B team.

== Career statistics ==
As of 10 April 2016

Appearances and goals by club, season and competition
| Club | Season | League | | | Cup | | Other | | Total | |
| Club | Season | Division | Apps | Goals | Apps | Goals | Apps | Goals | Apps | Goals |
|---|---|---|---|---|---|---|---|---|---|---|
| União Leiria | 1999–2000 | Primeira Liga | 0 | 0 | 1 | 0 | — | | 1 | 0 |
| União Leiria | 2000–01 | Primeira Liga | 0 | 0 | 0 | 0 | — | | 0 | 0 |
| União Leiria | 2001–02 | Primeira Liga | 17 | 0 | 0 | 0 | — | | 17 | 0 |
| União Leiria | 2002–03 | Primeira Liga | 19 | 3 | 2 | 1 | — | | 21 | 4 |
| União Leiria | 2003–04 | Primeira Liga | 32 | 4 | 2 | 1 | 4 (Note: Appearances in UEFA Europa League/UEFA Cup) | 0 | 38 | 5 |
| União Leiria | 2004–05 | Primeira Liga | 32 | 5 | 2 | 1 | — | | 37 | 6 |
| União Leiria | 2005–06 | Primeira Liga | 31 | 4 | 1 | 0 | — | | 32 | 4 |
| União Leiria | Total | | 131 | 16 | 8 | 3 | 4 | 0 | 143 | 19 |
| Sporting CP (loan) | 2002–03 | Primeira Liga | 6 | 0 | 1 | 0 | — | | 7 | 0 |
| Porto | 2006–07 | Primeira Liga | 3 | 0 | 1 | 0 | 0 | 0 | 4 | 0 |
| Porto | 2007–08 | Primeira Liga | 8 | 1 | 5 | 0 | 2 (Note: Appearances in UEFA Champions League) | 0 | 15 | 1 |
| Porto | Total | | 11 | 1 | 6 | 0 | 2 | 0 | 19 | 1 |
| Rapid București (loan) | 2008–09 | Liga I | 25 | 3 | 0 | 0 | 1 | 0 | 26 | 3 |
| Le Mans | 2009–10 | Ligue 1 | 23 | 0 | 3 | 1 | — | | 26 | 1 |
| Vitória Guimarães | 2010–11 | Primeira Liga | 22 | 1 | 6 | 1 | — | | 28 | 2 |
| Vitória Guimarães | 2011–12 | Primeira Liga | 23 | 0 | 4 | 1 | 3 | 0 | 30 | 1 |
| Vitória Guimarães | Total | | 45 | 1 | 10 | 2 | 3 | 0 | 58 | 3 |
| Omonia | 2012–13 | Cypriot First Division | 22 | 2 | 5 | 0 | 0 | 0 | 27 | 2 |
| Omonia | 2013–14 | Cypriot First Division | 21 | 4 | 3 | 0 | 2 | 1 | 26 | 5 |
| Omonia | Total | | 43 | 6 | 8 | 0 | 2 | 1 | 53 | 7 |
| Apollon Limassol | 2014–15 | Cypriot First Division | 19 | 3 | 1 | 0 | 6 | 0 | 26 | 3 |
| AEL Limassol | 2015–16 | Cypriot First Division | 28 | 1 | 3 | 0 | — | | 31 | 1 |
| Career total | | | 331 | 31 | 40 | 6 | 18 | 1 | 389 | 38 |

== Honours ==
Porto

- Primeira Liga: 2006–07, 2007–08
- Taça de Portugal runner-up: 2007–08

Omonia

- Cypriot Super Cup: 2012
