= Jorginho (footballer, born 1978) =

Portuguese footballer

Personal information
- Full name: Jorge Manuel Amador Galufo
- Date of birth: 29 May 1978 (age 48)
- Place of birth: Sines, Portugal
- Height: 1.88 m (6 ft 2 in)
- Position: Left back

Youth career
- 1990–1997: Vasco Gama

Senior career*
Years	Team	Apps	(Gls)
1997–2004	Vasco Gama		
2005	Modena	0	(0)
2005–2007	Estoril	51	(2)
2007–2008	Vitória Setúbal	14	(0)
2008	Asteras Tripolis	8	(0)
2009–2011	Paços Ferreira	40	(1)
2011	Arouca	10	(0)
2012–2013	União Santiago		
2014–2015	Vasco Gama	13	(0)
2015–2016	Praia de Milfontes	12	(0)
2016–2018	União Santiago		
- * Club domestic league appearances and goals as of 2018

Jorge Manuel Amador Galufo (born 29 May 1978), known as Jorginho, is a Portuguese footballer who played as a left back.

== Football career ==
Jorginho was born in Sines, Setúbal District. After several years with local Clube de Futebol Vasco da Gama he signed in January 2005 with Serie B side Modena FC, teaming up with compatriot Manú which had been loaned by S.L. Benfica.

For 2005–06, Jorginho returned to Portugal, going on to play two seasons in the second division with G.D. Estoril Praia. He moved to Vitória F.C. afterwards, making his Primeira Liga debut on 23 September 2007 and playing the entire 2–2 away draw against Sporting Clube de Portugal; still, he featured sparingly during the campaign.

Jorginho joined Asteras Tripolis (a team which also featured three other Portuguese players) in August 2008 but, unsettled, returned home after only a few months, signing for F.C. Paços de Ferreira during the January transfer window. On 9 February he played his first match for his new club, a 1–1 home draw to C.F. Os Belenenses.

Jorginho started 2011–12 with F.C. Arouca in the second level, managing to appear and start regularly during the first half of the season. In January 2012, however, the 33-year-old left and signed for União Sport Clube in the Setúbal second regional division.

== Honours ==
Vitória de Setúbal

- Taça da Liga: 2007–08
