= Tonel =

Portuguese footballer and manager (born 1980)

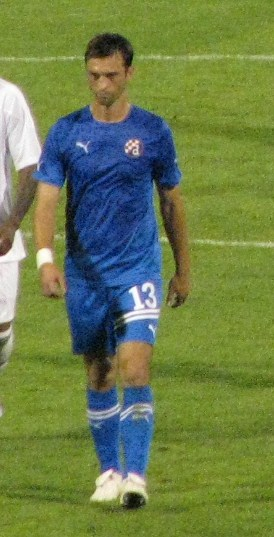
- Tonel with Dinamo Zagreb in 2011

Personal information
- Full name: António Leonel Vilar Nogueira Sousa
- Date of birth: 13 April 1980 (age 46)
- Place of birth: Lourosa, Portugal
- Height: 1.84 m (6 ft 0 in)
- Position: Centre-back

Youth career
- 1992–1993: Porto
- 1993–1995: Espinho
- 1995–1996: Porto
- 1996–1997: Espinho
- 1997–1999: Porto

Senior career*
| Years | Team | Apps | (Gls) |
| 1999–2004 | Porto B | 40 | (1) |
| 2001–2004 | → Académica (loan) | 111 | (9) |
| 2003 | → Académica B (loan) | 2 | (1) |
| 2004–2005 | Marítimo | 28 | (1) |
| 2005–2010 | Sporting CP | 117 | (10) |
| 2010–2012 | Dinamo Zagreb | 48 | (4) |
| 2013 | Beira-Mar | 4 | (0) |
| 2013–2015 | Feirense | 69 | (8) |
| 2015–2016 | Belenenses | 12 | (0) |
| Total | | 431 | (34) |

International career
| 2000–2002 | Portugal U21 | 24 | (1) |
| 2001–2005 | Portugal B | 5 | (0) |
| 2006–2010 | Portugal | 2 | (0) |

Managerial career
- 2017: Lusitânia
- 2018: União Lamas
- * Club domestic league appearances and goals

António Leonel Vilar Nogueira Sousa (Portuguese pronunciation: [tuˈnɛl]; born 13 April 1980), known as Tonel, is a Portuguese former professional footballer who played as a central defender. He was also a manager.

Over ten seasons, he amassed Primeira Liga totals of 223 games and 16 goals, mainly representing Sporting CP with which he won four major titles. He also spent three years in the Croatian Football League with Dinamo Zagreb.

== Club career ==
=== Porto and Marítimo ===
Born in Lourosa (Santa Maria da Feira), Tonel came through the youth system of FC Porto, and made his professional debut when he was loaned out to Académica de Coimbra for 2000–01, helping them to promote to the Primeira Liga in his second year. Despite earning a good reputation during his three-season spell, he was deemed surplus to requirements by his parent club and was released, moving to C.S. Marítimo in summer 2004 as part of an exchange deal with Porto which saw Pepe arrive at the Estádio do Dragão.

Tonel picked up some European experience during Marítimo's UEFA Cup tie against Rangers. He partnered with Dutchman Mitchell van der Gaag in defence and became one of the team's leading figures, playing 28 league games and scoring once in a 2–1 home win over Boavista F.C. on 25 September 2004.

=== Sporting CP ===
On 23 July 2005, after an impressive season, Tonel signed a three-year deal with Sporting CP for €500,000. His second stint with a club of the Big Three was much more successful than the first, as he was everpresent at the back four alongside Brazil international Ânderson Polga, also scoring the occasional goal on set pieces.

After renewing his link with the Lions until 2011, Tonel scored five competitive goals in 2007–08, including one in a 2–1 away victory over FC Dynamo Kyiv in the group stage of the UEFA Champions League (incidentally, Polga netted the other). In late October 2008, after an injury in a draw at F.C. Paços de Ferreira, he lost his place to youth graduate Daniel Carriço, and never regained it again during that season, although he himself took Polga's place midway through the following campaign.

On 11 March 2010, Tonel was sent off at the end of a Europa League last 16 first leg game away to Atlético Madrid for striking Sergio Agüero. Fellow defender Leandro Grimi had been dismissed in the first half of the goalless draw, and Sporting lost the tie on the away goals rule.

=== Dinamo Zagreb ===
On 27 August 2010, after falling out of favour with new manager Paulo Sérgio, the 30-year-old Tonel signed for GNK Dinamo Zagreb. He made his official debut in an Eternal derby match drawn 1–1 away to HNK Hajduk Split, on 11 September; he was awarded the No. 13 shirt in the Croatian Football League, but played with No. 28 in European fixtures as Dario Šimić had been registered with the former number before retiring. His first season resulted in the club winning the league and cup double, and he scored in the 5–1 win (8–2 aggregate) over NK Varaždin in the cup final on 11 May.

Tonel added a second consecutive double in 2011–12, after playing in a 3–1 cup final defeat of NK Osijek in May. He was released at the end of his contract, in December 2012.

=== Return to Portugal ===
On 7 January 2013, Tonel returned to his homeland and joined top-division S.C. Beira-Mar, signing until June 2014. After suffering relegation, however, he terminated his contract and went on to spend a further two seasons in the Segunda Liga with C.D. Feirense.

Aged 35, Tonel returned to the top flight on 9 June 2015 after agreeing to a one-year contract with C.F. Os Belenenses. Early into the campaign, he was criticised for committing a 90th-minute handball penalty in favour of his former team Sporting at the Estádio José Alvalade, with his action resulting in a 1–0 loss for Belenenses.

== International career ==
Tonel made his debut with Portugal in a UEFA Euro 2008 qualifier against Kazakhstan in Coimbra, featuring 77 minutes of a 3–0 win on 15 November 2006. His second cap came more than three years later, on 3 March 2010, as he was called up as a last-minute replacement for injured Ricardo Carvalho for a friendly with China and played in the 2–0 win.

== Coaching career ==
After retiring, Tonel became sporting director of his hometown club Lusitânia FC. In March 2017, he replaced Martelinho as its manager in the Aveiro Football Association's first district league. He was himself relieved of his duties in June.

In January 2018, Tonel was appointed at C.F. União de Lamas in the same competition. He left six months later, having led them to fourth place.

== Career statistics ==
Appearances and goals by club, season and competition
| Club | Season | League | | | Cup | | Continental | | Total | |
| Club | Season | Division | Apps | Goals | Apps | Goals | Apps | Goals | Apps | Goals |
|---|---|---|---|---|---|---|---|---|---|---|
| Porto | 1999–2000 | Primeira Liga | 0 | 0 | 0 | 0 | 0 | 0 | 0 | 0 |
| Académica (loan) | 2000–01 | Segunda Liga | 18 | 2 | 0 | 0 | — | | 18 | 2 |
| Académica (loan) | 2001–02 | Segunda Liga | 31 | 2 | 4 | 0 | — | | 35 | 2 |
| Académica (loan) | 2002–03 | Primeira Liga | 31 | 2 | 2 | 1 | — | | 33 | 3 |
| Académica (loan) | 2003–04 | Primeira Liga | 31 | 3 | 1 | 0 | — | | 32 | 3 |
| Académica (loan) | Total | | 111 | 9 | 7 | 1 | — | | 118 | 10 |
| Marítimo | 2004–05 | Primeira Liga | 28 | 1 | 4 | 0 | 2 (Note: Appearances in UEFA Cup) | 0 | 34 | 1 |
| Sporting CP | 2005–06 | Primeira Liga | 30 | 2 | 1 | 0 | 1 | 0 | 32 | 2 |
| Sporting CP | 2006–07 | Primeira Liga | 25 | 2 | 4 | 0 | 6 (Note: Appearances in UEFA Champions League) | 0 | 35 | 2 |
| Sporting CP | 2007–08 | Primeira Liga | 27 | 4 | 13 (Note: Includes appearances in Supertaça Cândido de Oliveira) | 1 | 6 | 1 | 46 | 6 |
| Sporting CP | 2008–09 | Primeira Liga | 12 | 1 | 3 | 0 | 5 | 1 | 20 | 2 |
| Sporting CP | 2009–10 | Primeira Liga | 23 | 1 | 5 | 0 | 1 | 0 | 29 | 1 |
| Sporting CP | Total | | 117 | 10 | 26 | 1 | 19 | 2 | 162 | 13 |
| Dinamo Zagreb | 2010–11 | Croatian Football League | 22 | 2 | 6 | 2 | 6 (Note: Appearances in UEFA Europa League) | 0 | 34 | 4 |
| Dinamo Zagreb | 2011–12 | Croatian Football League | 20 | 2 | 6 | 0 | 10 | 0 | 36 | 2 |
| Dinamo Zagreb | 2012–13 | Croatian Football League | 6 | 0 | 1 | 0 | 8 | 1 | 15 | 1 |
| Dinamo Zagreb | Total | | 48 | 4 | 13 | 2 | 24 | 1 | 85 | 7 |
| Beira-Mar | 2012–13 | Primeira Liga | 4 | 0 | 0 | 0 | — | | 4 | 0 |
| Feirense | 2013–14 | Segunda Liga | 34 | 3 | 5 | 0 | — | | 39 | 3 |
| Feirense | 2014–15 | Segunda Liga | 35 | 5 | 6 | 1 | — | | 41 | 6 |
| Feirense | Total | | 69 | 8 | 11 | 1 | — | | 80 | 9 |
| Belenenses | 2015–16 | Primeira Liga | 12 | 0 | 2 | 0 | 8 | 0 | 22 | 0 |
| Career total | | | 389 | 32 | 63 | 5 | 53 | 3 | 505 | 40 |

== Honours ==
Sporting CP

- Taça de Portugal: 2006–07, 2007–08
- Supertaça Cândido de Oliveira: 2007, 2008
- Taça da Liga runner-up: 2007–08, 2008–09

Dinamo Zagreb

- Croatian Football League: 2010–11, 2011–12
- Croatian Football Cup: 2010–11, 2011–12

Portugal U18

- UEFA European Under-18 Championship: 1999
