= Tarik Sektioui =

Moroccan footballer and manager (born 1977)

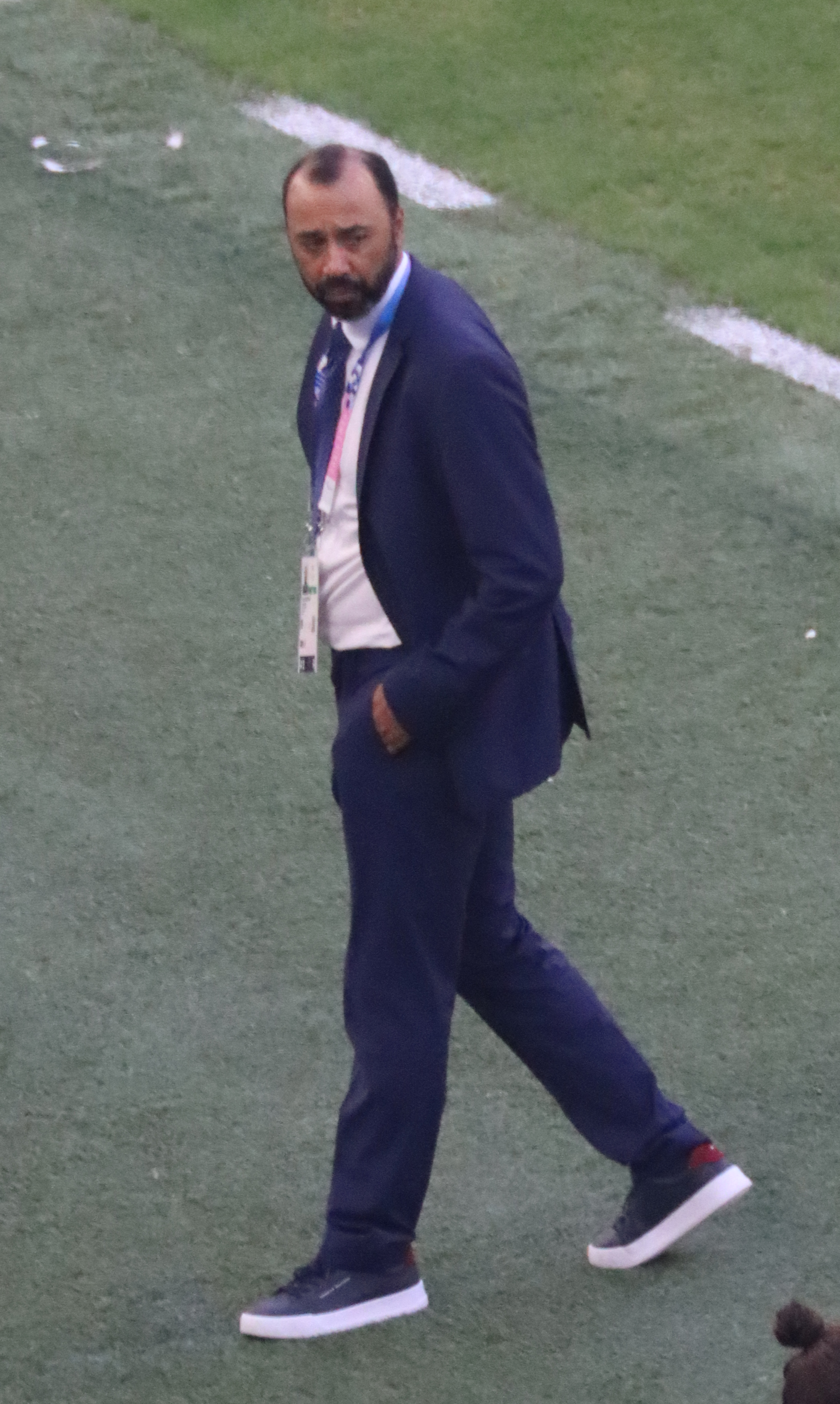
- Sektioui as Morocco U23 manager at the 2024 Summer Olympics.

Personal information
- Full name: Tarik Sektioui
- Date of birth: 13 May 1977 (age 49)
- Place of birth: Fez, Morocco
- Height: 1.82 m (6 ft 0 in)
- Position: Winger

Youth career
- 1996–1997: Maghreb Fès

Senior career*
Years	Team	Apps	(Gls)
1997–1999	Auxerre	5	(0)
1999	→ Marítimo (loan)	2	(0)
1999	Neuchâtel Xamax	9	(0)
2000–2004	Willem II	85	(19)
2004–2006	AZ	48	(10)
2006–2009	Porto	36	(7)
2007	→ RKC (loan)	9	(0)
2009–2010	Ajman Club	25	(3)
2010–2011	Maghreb Fès	12	(4)
Total		228	(43)

International career
1997	Morocco U20	10	(1)
2001–2008	Morocco	21	(7)

Managerial career
- 2013: Maghreb Fès
- 2014–2015: Wydad Fès
- 2016–2019: Maghreb Fès
- 2018–2019: Morocco U19
- 2019: Moghreb Tétouan
- 2019–2021: RS Berkane
- 2021: Emirates Club
- 2022–2023: Union Touarga
- 2023–2024: Maghreb Fès
- 2024–2025: Morocco U23
- 2025–2026: Morocco A'
- 2026–: Oman
Medal record
Men's football
Representing Morocco (as manager)
FIFA Arab Cup
Winner	2025 Qatar	Team
African Nations Championship
Winner	2024 Kenya-Tanzania-Uganda
Olympic Games
Bronze medal – third place	2024 Paris	Team
- * Club domestic league appearances and goals

Tarik Sektioui (Arabic: طارق السكتيوي; born 13 May 1977) is a Moroccan professional football coach and former player who is the currently head coach for Oman national team.

He spent most of his professional career in the Netherlands and Portugal, amassing Eredivisie totals of 142 games and 29 goals over the course of eight seasons for Willem II, AZ and RKC in the former, and winning several honours with Porto in the latter. A full international for Morocco, he represented the side at the 2008 Africa Cup of Nations.

Sektioui began managing in 2013 in his first of three spells at Maghreb de Fès, winning the Moroccan Throne Cup with them in 2016 and the CAF Confederation Cup with RS Berkane in 2019–20. He led three other clubs in the Botola Pro and had a brief spell in the UAE Pro League with Emirates Club.

== Playing career ==
=== Club ===
Born in Fez, Sektioui played two seasons at French club Auxerre, failing to establish with the first team and also appearing sparingly for the reserves during his spell. He arrived at the Netherlands and Tilburg's Willem II in January 2000 from Swiss side Neuchâtel Xamax, going on to play a major role and eventually gaining captaincy.

In the 2004–05 campaign, Sektioui switched to AZ thus returning to the Eredivisie. During his two-year tenure, he scored some vital goals and formed an efficient attacking partnership with Shota Averladze.

After an uneventful loan stint in 1999 with Marítimo, Sektioui returned to Portugal in July 2006 after Co Adriaanse (also his coach at Willem II) signed him for Porto. He would find the adjustment difficult, and spent the second half of the season on loan to another Dutch team, RKC Waalwijk. On 3 February 2007, he played his first game, against NAC Breda.

Even though Adriaanse was gone, Sektioui was recalled for 2007–08, and was a key member of the squad coached by Jesualdo Ferreira that retained the Primeira Liga title with five matches remaining. On the fourth day of the group stage of the UEFA Champions League, he scored arguably the best goal of the night after overtaking five Marseille defenders before hitting home beyond the goalkeeper; Porto eventually reached the round-of-16, ousted by Schalke 04 on penalties.

On 2 July 2009, after having featured rarely for Porto during the campaign – 17 appearances all competitions comprised – Sektioui moved to Ajman Club in the United Arab Emirates, on a one-year deal. He retired after one season aged 33, but later went back on his decision and joined his very first professional club, his hometown's Maghreb Fès.

=== International ===
A Moroccan international since 2001, Sektioui represented his nation in the 2008 Africa Cup of Nations, scoring a penalty in the 5–1 rout of Namibia.

== Managerial career ==
After coaching at the Mohammed VI Football Academy, Sektioui was hired on a three-year deal at Maghreb de Fès, after Azzedine Aït Djoudi left for JS Kabylie. After a spell at Wydad AC he returned to his relegated local club for two years in July 2016. On 20 November, he won the Moroccan Throne Cup with a 2–1 victory over OC Safi in the final in Laayoune.

In February 2019, Sektioui moved to Moghreb Tétouan on an 18-month deal for a salary of 120,000 Moroccan dirhams. The northern club was ranked in 14th. He was dismissed in July for undisclosed breach of contract.

Sektioui signed a two-year deal at RS Berkane in September 2019. On 25 October of the following year, his team won the CAF Confederation Cup with a 1–0 win over Egypt's Pyramids in the final in Rabat. He resigned on 7 March 2021 after a 2–1 defeat to AS FAR.

He moved to his first foreign managerial job at newly promoted UAE Pro League side Emirates Club for the 2021–22 season. He resigned on 27 December, having taken one point in 12 games for the last-placed club.

In 2022, Sektioui returned to his country's top flight, at Union de Touarga. In July 2023, he returned to Maghreb de Fès. On 29 February 2024, Sektioui was appointed head coach of the Morocco national under-23 football team by the Royal Moroccan Football Federation to replace Issame Charaï.

== Personal life ==
Sektioui's older brother, Abdelhadi, was also a footballer and manager. He was employed by Maghreb Fès in both roles too.

== Honours ==
=== Player ===
Porto

- Primeira Liga: 2006–07, 2007–08, 2008–09
- Taça de Portugal: 2008–09
- Supertaça Cândido de Oliveira: 2006

Maghreb Fès

- CAF Confederation Cup: 2011

Morocco U20

- U-20 Africa Cup of Nations: 1997

Individual

- U-20 Africa Cup of Nations Best Player: 1997

=== Manager ===
Maghreb Fès

- Moroccan Throne Cup: 2016

RS Berkane

- CAF Confederation Cup: 2019–20

Morocco U23

- Olympic Bronze Medal: 2024

Morocco A'

- African Nations Championship: 2024
- FIFA Arab Cup: 2025
