= 2007–08 Taça de Portugal =

Taça de Portugal Millennium

Tournament details
- Country: Portugal
- Teams: 202

Final positions
- Champions: Sporting CP (15th title)
- Runners-up: Porto

Tournament statistics
- Matches played: 211
- Top goal scorer(s): Óscar Cardozo (5 goals)

The 2007–08 Taça de Portugal was the 68th edition of the Portuguese football knockout tournament, organized by the Portuguese Football Federation (FPF). The 2007–08 Taça de Portugal began on 2 September 2007. The final was played on 18 May 2008 at the Estádio Nacional.

Sporting CP were the previous holders, having defeated Belenenses 1–0 in the previous season's final. Sporting CP regained the Taça de Portugal by defeating Porto, 2–0 in the final to win there fifteenth Taça de Portugal. By winning the Taça de Portugal, Sporting CP qualified for the 2008 Supertaça Cândido de Oliveira.

== Format and schedule ==
Round	Date(s)	Clubs entering this round	Clubs from the previous round	Clubs involved	Fixtures
First round ^{1}	2 September 2007	118 clubs competing in the Terceira Divisão and Portuguese District Leagues	none	118	55
Second round ^{2}	23 September 2007	64 clubs competing in the Portuguese Second Division	55 winners from the first round	114	52
Third round	7–18 November 2007	16 clubs competing in the Liga de Honra	52 winners from the second round	78	38
Fourth round	7–9 December 2007	16 clubs competing in the Primeira Liga	38 winners from third round	58	28
Fifth round	19–20 January 2008	none	28 winners from fourth round	29	14
Sixth round	9–10 February 2008	none	14 winners from fifth round	15	7
Quarter-finals	27 February 2008	none	7 winners from sixth round	8	4
Semi-finals	15–16 April 2008	none	4 winners from the quarterfinals	4	2
Final	18 May 2008	none	2 winners from the semifinals	2	1

- ^1 Os Marítimos (IV) did not participate in the competition.
- ^2 Marítimo B (III) was unable to compete in the domestic cup competition due to the possibility of encountering their senior side in the competition.

== Teams ==
=== Primeira Liga ===
- Académica de Coimbra
- Belenenses
- Benfica
- Boavista
- Braga
- Estrela da Amadora
- Leixões
- Marítimo
- Nacional
- Naval
- Paços de Ferreira
- Porto
- Sporting CP
- União de Leiria
- Vitória de Guimarães
- Vitória de Setúbal

=== Liga de Honra ===
- Beira-Mar
- Desportivo das Aves
- Estoril
- Fátima
- Feirense
- Freamunde
- Gil Vicente
- Gondomar
- Olhanense
- Penafiel
- Portimonense
- Rio Ave
- Santa Clara
- Trofense
- Varzim
- Vizela

=== Second Division ===
Série A

- Camacha
- Chaves
- Fafe
- Ribeirão
- Lixa
- Lousada
- Machico
- Maria da Fonte
- Merelinense
- Moreirense
- Portosantense
- Tirsense
- União da Madeira
- Valdevez

Série B

- Avanca
- Caniçal
- Esmoriz
- Fiães
- Infesta
- Leça
- Lusitânia Lourosa
- Oliveirense
- Pontassolense
- Ribeira Brava
- Sporting de Espinho
- Vila Meã

Série C

- Abrantes
- Anadia
- Benfica Castelo Branco
- Caldas
- Eléctrico
- Nelas
- Oliveira do Bairro
- Pampilhosa
- Penalva do Castelo
- Rio Maior
- Sátão
- Sporting da Covilhã
- Torreense
- Tourizense

Série D

- Atlético CP
- Carregado
- Juventude Évora
- Lagoa
- Louletano
- Lusitânia
- Madalena
- Mafra
- Messinense
- Odivelas
- Olivais Moscavide
- Operário
- Pinhalnovense
- Real

=== Third Division ===
Série A

- Vieira
- Mirandela
- Vianense
- Mondinense
- Joane
- Bragança
- Marinhas
- Macedo de Cavaleiros
- Vidago
- Valenciano
- Amares
- Prado
- Brito
- Morais

Série B

- AD Oliveirense
- Amarante
- Padroense
- Paredes
- Aliados Lordelo
- Serzedelo
- Torre de Moncorvo
- Rebordosa
- Nogueirense
- São Pedro da Cova
- Oliveira do Douro
- Pedras Rubras
- Famalicão
- Maia

Série C

- Académico de Viseu
- Arouca
- Dragões Sandinenses
- Ginásio Figueirense
- Milheiroense
- Oliveira do Hospital
- Sanjoanense
- São João de Ver
- Social Lamas
- Tocha
- Tondela
- União de Lamas
- Valecambrense
- Valonguense

Série D

- Alcobaça
- Caranguejeira
- Gândara
- Lousanense
- Marinhense
- Mirandense
- Monsanto
- Penamacorense
- Portomosense
- Sertanense
- Sourense
- Sporting de Pombal
- Unhais da Serra
- União da Serra

Série E

- 1º Dezembro
- Alcochetense
- Atlético Cacém
- Bombarralense
- Câmara de Lobos
- Cartaxo
- Estrela Portalegre
- Estrela Vendas Novas
- Fazendense
- Igreja Nova
- O Elvas
- Oriental
- Santana
- Sintrense

Série F

- Aljustrelense
- Almancilense
- Amora
- Barreirense
- Beira-Mar de Monte Gordo
- Campinense
- Cova da Piedade
- Fabril
- Ferreiras
- Imortal
- Lusitano
- Quarteirense
- Silves
- União Montemor

Série Azores

- Angrense
- Boavista São Mateus
- Capelense
- Fayal
- Lajense
- Praiense
- Rabo de Peixe
- Santiago
- União Micaelense

District Leagues

- Aguiar da Beira
- Águias do Moradal
- Alvorense
- Ansião
- Boticas
- Bustelo
- Candal
- Campomaiorense
- Cinfães
- Flamengos
- Freiria
- Mirandês
- Monção
- Monte Trigo
- Moura
- Ouriquense
- Santa Eulália
- Sesimbra
- Velense
- Vigor Mocidade

== First round ==
For the first round draw, teams were drawn against each other in accordance to their geographical location. The draw was split up into four sections: teams from the north, the center, the south and the Azores region. All first round cup ties were played on the 2 September. Due to the odd number of matches involved at this stage of the competition, Fayal, Maia, Mirandense, Penamacorense and Torre de Moncorvo progressed to the next round. The first round of the cup saw teams from the Terceira Divisão (IV) start the competition alongside some teams who registered to participate in the cup from the Portuguese District Leagues (V).

=== North Zone ===
Home team	Score	Away team
Amarante (IV)	1–0	Brito (IV)
Bragança (IV)	2–1	Vieira (IV)
Candal (V)	0–2	Amares (IV)
Cinfães (V)	1–2	Pedras Rubras (IV)
Joane (IV)	1–2	Vianense (IV)
Macedo de Cavaleiros (IV)	2–2 (aet, p. 1–3)	Rebordosa (IV)
Marinhas (IV)	4–3 (aet)	AD Oliveirense (IV)
Mirandela (IV)	1–0	Aliados Lordelo (IV)

Home team	Score	Away team
Monção (V)	3–1	Morais (IV)
Mondinense (IV)	2–1	Famalicão (IV)
Padroense (IV)	3–2	Nogueirense (IV)
Prado (IV)	9–0	Mirandês (V)
São Pedro da Cova (IV)	1–2	Santa Eulália (V)
Serzedelo (IV)	4–0	Boticas (V)
Valenciano (IV)	2–1	Paredes (IV)
Vidago (IV)	0–2	Oliveira do Douro (IV)

=== Central Zone ===
Home team	Score	Away team
Académico de Viseu (IV)	2–0	Portomosense (IV)
Alcobaça (IV)	0–2	Vigor Mocidade (V)
Gândara (IV)	2–0	São João de Ver (IV)
Ginásio Figueirense (IV)	1–1 (aet, p. 8–7)	União de Lamas (IV)
Lousanense (IV)	4–0	Bustelo (V)
Marinhense (IV)	1–2	Sertanense (IV)
Monsanto (IV)	5–0	Caranguejeira (IV)
Sanjoanense (IV)	2–1 (aet)	Oliveira do Hospital (IV)

Home team	Score	Away team
Social Lamas (IV)	0–0 (aet, p. 3–1)	Milheiroense (IV)
Sourense (IV)	4–0	Unhais da Serra (IV)
Sporting de Pombal (IV)	1–2	Ansião (V)
Tocha (IV)	WO	Dragões Sandinenses (IV)
Tondela (IV)	0–2	Arouca (IV)
UD Valonguense (IV)	2–1	Aguiar da Beira (V)
União da Serra (IV)	3–1	Águias do Moradal (V)
Valecambrense (IV)	6–1	Campomaiorense (V)

=== South Zone ===
Home team	Score	Away team
1º Dezembro (IV)	1–0	Aljustrelense (IV)
Alcochetense (IV)	1–2	Ferreiras (IV)
Atlético Cacém (IV)	1–0	Campinense (IV)
Barreirense (IV)	2–1	Ouriquense (V)
Câmara de Lobos (IV)	2–0	Imortal (IV)
Cartaxo (IV)	1–0 (aet)	Beira-Mar de Monte Gordo (IV)
Cova da Piedade (IV)	3–1	Estrela Portalegre (IV)
Estrela Vendas Novas (IV)	0–1	Oriental (IV)
Fabril (IV)	5–0	Alvorense (V)

Home team	Score	Away team
Fazendense (IV)	1–0	Bombarralense (IV)
Freiria (V)	0–4	Sesimbra (V)
Monte Trigo (V)	1–1 (aet, p. 2–3)	União Montemor (IV)
Moura (V)	1–0	O Elvas (IV)
Quarteirense (IV)	1–2	Lusitano (IV)
Santana (IV)	1–1 (aet, p. 5–4)	Amora (IV)
Silves (IV)	0–1	Igreja Nova (IV)
Sintrense (IV)	2–2 (aet, p. 3–2)	Almancilense (IV)

=== Azores Zone ===
Home team	Score	Away team
Angrense (IV)	1–0 (aet)	Santiago (IV)
Capelense (IV)	4–0	Flamengos (V)
Lajense (IV)	3–1	Marítimo SC (IV)

Home team	Score	Away team
Rabo Peixe (IV)	1–0	Boavista de São Mateus (IV)
União Micaelense (IV)	1–0	Praiense (IV)
Velense (V)	0–2	Marítimo Graciosa (IV)

== Second round ==
Ties were played on the 23 September. Due to the odd number of matches at this stage of the competition, 1º Dezembro, Abrantes, Cova da Piedade, Merelinense, Monção, Padroense, Pampilhosa, Rio Maior, Sátão and Valecambrense qualified for the third round. The second round saw teams from the Portuguese Second Division (III) enter the competition.

=== Série A ===
Home team	Score	Away team
Bragança (IV)	1–2 (aet)	Valdevez (III)
Chaves (III)	6–2	Valenciano (IV)
Fafe (III)	3–0	Câmara de Lobos (IV)
Lousada (III)	1–1 (aet, p. 5–6)	Maria da Fonte (III)
Machico (III)	2–1	Mirandela (IV)
Marinhas (IV)	2–1 (aet)	Lixa (III)
Mondinense (IV)	1–0	União da Madeira (III)

Home team	Score	Away team
Moreirense (III)	5–0	Vianense (IV)
Portosantense (III)	1–0	Prado (IV)
Ribeirão (III)	1–2	Serzedelo (IV)
Santa Eulália (V)	0–3	Camacha (III)
Santana (IV)	0–0 (aet, p. 0–3)	Tirsense (III)
Torre de Moncorvo (IV)	4–2	Amares (IV)

=== Série B ===
Home team	Score	Away team
Amarante (IV)	2–0	Caniçal (III)
Avanca (III)	0–6	Esmoriz (III)
Lusitânia Lourosa (III)	1–1 (aet, p. 4–5)	Fiães (III)
Oliveirense (III)	5–0	UD Valonguense (V)
Pontassolense (III)	2–0	Oliveira do Douro (IV)

Home team	Score	Away team
Rebordosa (IV)	0–0 (aet, p. 4–2)	Arouca (III)
Ribeira Brava (III)	1–3	Infesta (III)
Sanjoanense (IV)	1–0	Maia (IV)
Sporting de Espinho (III)	2–0	Pedras Rubras (IV)
Vila Meã (III)	2–3 (aet)	Leça (III)

=== Série C ===
Home team	Score	Away team
Académico de Viseu (III)	1–3	Sporting da Covilhã (III)
Anadia (III)	1–0	Gândara (IV)
Ansião (V)	1–3	Caldas (III)
Benfica Castelo Branco (III)	1–3	Oliveira do Bairro (III)
Fazendense (IV)	0–2 (aet)	Sertanense (IV)
Ginásio Figueirense (IV)	0–1	Cartaxo (IV)
Lousanense (IV)	0–1	Penalva Castelo (III)

Home team	Score	Away team
Monsanto (IV)	8–0	Mirandense (IV)
Nelas (III)	4–0	Vigor Mocidade (V)
Tocha (IV)	2–1	Social Lamas (IV)
Torreense (III)	3–3 (aet, p. 4–2)	Eléctrico (III)
Tourizense (III)	6–1	Penamacorense (IV)
União da Serra (IV)	2–0	Sourense (IV)

=== Série D ===
Home team	Score	Away team
Angrense (IV)	0–1	Louletano (III)
Atlético Cacém (IV)	4–1	Ferreiras (IV)
Barreirense (IV)	1–0 (aet)	Madalena (III)
Fabril (IV)	0–3	Pinhalnovense (III)
Fayal (IV)	3–0	Lajense (V)
Juventude Évora (III)	4–0	Moura (V)
Lagoa (III)	3–3 (aet, p. 5–3)	Oriental (IV)
Lusitânia (III)	2–1	Mafra (III)

Home team	Score	Away team
Messinense (III)	3–2 (aet)	Lusitano (IV)
Odivelas (III)	3–1	Capelense (IV)
Olivais Moscavide (III)	0–3	Carregado (III)
Operário (III)	1–0	Sintrense (IV)
Real (III)	1–0	Igreja Nova (IV)
Sesimbra (V)	1–0	Rabo Peixe (IV)
União de Montemor (IV)	1–2	Atlético CP (III)
União Micaelense (IV)	1–0	Marítimo Graciosa (IV)

== Third round ==
Ties were played on the 7–18 November. Due to the odd number of matches at this stage of the competition, Olhanense and Tocha qualified for the fourth round. The third round saw teams from the Liga de Honra (II) enter the competition.

Home team	Score	Away team
Gil Vicente (II)	2–1	Estoril (II)
Penafiel (II)	1–0	Varzim (II)
Abrantes (III)	4–2 (aet)	Sporting de Espinho (III)
Atlético do Cacém (IV)	0–1	Real III)
Barreirense (IV)	2–4	Desportivo das Aves (II)
Beira-Mar (II)	1–0	Amarante (IV)
Cartaxo (IV)	1–3	Serzedelo (IV)
Cova da Piedade (IV)	1–0	Sesimbra (V)
Fafe (III)	1–1 (aet, p. 3–5)	Juventude Évora (III)
Fátima (II)	2–1	Rio Maior (III)
Fiães (III)	0–1	Portimonense (II)
Freamunde (II)	1–0	Pampilhosa (III)
Gondomar (II)	0–1	Feirense (II)
Lagoa (III)	1–1 (aet, p. 5–4)	Pinhalnovense (III)
Leça (III)	1–2	Chaves (III)
Lusitânia (III)	1–1 (aet, p. 6–5)	Caldas (III)
Machico (III)	3–1 (aet)	Padroense (IV)
Maria da Fonte (III)	0–1	Carregado (III)
Marinhas (IV)	0–2	Louletano (III)

Home team	Score	Away team
Merelinense (III)	2–2 (aet, p. 2–3)	Anadia (III)
Messinense (III)	2–2 (aet, p. 4–3)	Tirsense (III)
Monção (V)	1–2	Infesta (III)
Mondinense (IV)	2–2 (aet, p. 5–3)	Pontassolense (III)
Monsanto (IV)	1–0	Esmoriz (III)
Nelas (III)	2–0	Valecambrense (IV)
Oliveira do Bairro (III)	1–3 (aet)	Santa Clara (II)
Penalva Castelo (III)	0–1	Torre de Moncorvo (IV)
Portosantense (III)	0–2	Moreirense (III)
Rebordosa (IV)	1–0	Trofense (II)
Rio Ave (II)	1–1 (aet, p. 5–3)	Odivelas (III)
Sanjoanense (IV)	0–1	Camacha (III)
Sátão (III)	1–2	Operário (III)
Sertanense (IV)	5–0	Fayal (IV)
Sporting da Covilhã (III)	1–2	Vizela (II)
Torreense (III)	2–0	1º Dezembro (IV)
Tourizense (III)	0–2	Atlético CP (III)
União da Serra (IV)	1–3 (aet)	Oliveirense (III)
União Micaelense (IV)	0–1	Valdevez (III)

== Fourth round ==
Ties were played on the 7–9 December. Due to the odd number of matches at this stage of the competition, Boavista and Marítimo qualified for the fifth round. The fourth round saw teams from the Primeira Liga (I) enter the competition.

Home team	Score	Away team
Chaves (III)	0–2	Porto (I)
Leixões (I)	4–0	Torreense (III)
Nacional (I)	5–0	Cova da Piedade (IV)
Sporting CP (I)	4–0	Louletano (III)
Belenenses (I)	2–2 (aet, p. 4–5)	Paços de Ferreira (I)
Atlético CP (III)	0–1	Vitória de Guimarães (I)
Carregado (III)	1–2	Olhanense (II)
Feirense (II)	4–1	Lusitânia (III)
Lagoa (III)	3–2	Santa Clara (II)
Oliveirense (III)	4–0	Mondinense (IV)
Operário (III)	0–1	Vitória de Setúbal (I)
Real (III)	0–1	Desportivo das Aves (II)
Serzedelo (IV)	0–3	Naval (I)
Valdevez (III)	3–1 (aet)	Tocha (IV)

Home team	Score	Away team
Abrantes (III)	0–0 (aet, p. 6–5)	Monsanto (IV)
Anadia (III)	1–0	Freamunde (II)
Beira-Mar (II)	0–0 (aet, p. 3–2)	Torre de Moncorvo (IV)
Camacha (III)	2–3	Braga (I)
Estrela da Amadora (I)	4–2 (aet)	Fátima (II)
Infesta (III)	1–2	Juventude Évora (III)
Messinense (III)	0–2	Gil Vicente (II)
Moreirense (III)	4–0	Machico (III)
Penafiel (II)	2–1	Vizela (II)
Sertanense (IV)	2–1 (aet)	Portimonense (II)
União de Leiria (I)	2–0	Nelas (III)
Rio Ave (II)	6–1	Rebordosa (IV)
Benfica (I)	3–1	Académica de Coimbra (I)

== Fifth round ==
Ties were played on the 19–20 January. Due to the odd number of participants involved at this stage of the competition, Valdevez qualified for the quarter-finals due to having no opponent to face.

19 January 2008	Porto (I)	2–0	Desportivo das Aves (II)	Estádio do Dragão, Porto
	Farías 31'; Quaresma 90+4'			Attendance: 20,319; Referee: Artur Soares Dias

19 January 2008	Beira-Mar (II)	0–1	Moreirense (III)	Parque de Jogos da AA Avanca, Estarreja
15:00			Cascavel 54'	Referee: Rui Silva

19 January 2008	Benfica (I)	1–0	Feirense (II)	Estádio da Luz, Lisbon
16:00	Cardozo 51'			Referee: Bruno Paixão

19 January 2008	Vitória de Setúbal (I)	1–0	União de Leiria (I)	Estádio do Bonfim, Setúbal
16:00	Matheus 90+4'			Referee: Duarte Gomes

19 January 2008	Sporting CP (I)	4–0	Lagoa (III)	Estádio José Alvalade, Lisbon
17:00	Moutinho 7'; Abel 57'; Tero 72' (o.g.); Gladstone 86'			Attendance: 11,292; Referee: Vasco Santos

20 January 2008	Oliveirense (II)	0–1	Marítimo (I)	Estádio Carlos Osório, Oliveira de Azeméis
14:30			Fogaça 15'	Referee: João Vilas Boas

20 January 2008	Estrela da Amadora (I)	1–0	Braga (I)	Estádio José Gomes, Amadora
15:00	Mateus 7' (pen.)			Referee: João Ferreira

20 January 2008	Gil Vicente (II)	3–0	Juventude Évora (III)	Estádio Cidade de Barcelos, Barcelos
15:00	Hermes 7', 13'; Óscar 58'			Referee: Rui Costa

20 January 2008	Leixões (I)	1–0	Anadia (III)	Estádio do Mar, Matosinhos
15:00	Roberto 75'			Referee: Marco Ferreira

20 January 2008	Naval (I)	4–1	Boavista (II)	Estádio Municipal José Bento Pessoa, Figueira da Foz
15:00	Saulo 19'; Marcelinho 69', 74'; Dudu 77'		Laionel 8'	Referee: Pedro Proença

20 January 2008	Penafiel (II)	1–1 (a.e.t.) (4–5 p)	Sertanense (IV)	Estádio Municipal 25 de Abril, Penafiel
15:00	Guedes 90' (pen.)		Vicente 63'	Referee: Luís Reforço
	Penalties
	(penalty scored) (penalty scored) (penalty scored) (penalty scored); Bakero (penalty missed)		Penalty scored

20 January 2008	Rio Ave (II)	3–3 (a.e.t.) (2–1 p)	Olhanense (II)	Estádio dos Arcos, Vila do Conde
15:00	Milhazes 17'; Chidi 69'; Keita 99'		Sandro 21'; Toy 80'; Fumo 109'	Referee: João Capela
	Penalties
	Evandro (penalty scored); Gomes (penalty scored) (penalty missed) (penalty missed) (penalty missed)		(penalty scored) Djalmir (penalty missed) (penalty missed) (penalty missed) (penalty missed)

20 January 2008	Vitória de Guimarães (I)	1–0	Nacional (I)	Estádio D. Afonso Henriques, Guimarães
15:00	Meireles 20'			Attendance: 11,560; Referee: Paulo Costa

20 January 2008	Paços de Ferreira (I)	4–0	Abrantes (III)	Estádio da Mata Real, Paços de Ferreira
16:00	Furtado 15'; Carioca 20'; Wesley 62'; Pedrinha 64'			Referee: Hugo Miguel

== Sixth round ==
Ties were played on the 9–10 February. Due to the odd number of participants involved at this stage of the competition, Estrela da Amadora qualified for the quarter-finals due to having no opponent to face.

9 February 2008	Sporting CP (I)	2–1	Marítimo (I)	Estádio José Alvalade, Lisbon
20:45	Tonel 5'; Liédson 43'		Van der Linden 38'	Referee: Bruno Paixão

10 February 2008	Sertanense (IV)	0–4	Porto (I)	Campo de Jogos Doutor Marques dos Santos, Sertã
			Sektioui 8'; Farías 36', 49'; Kaźmierczak 45'	Referee: Lucílio Batista

10 February 2008	Valdevez (III)	0–3	Moreirense (II)	Estádio Municipal da Coutada, Arcos de Valdevez
14:30			Hélio 16'; Marques 32'; Cascavel 46'	Referee: Arnaldo Araújo

10 February 2008	Gil Vicente (II)	1–0 (a.e.t.)	Leixões (I)	Estádio Cidade de Barcelos, Barcelos
15:00	Gaúcho 114'			Referee: Olegário Benquerença

10 February 2008	Naval (I)	3–1 (a.e.t.)	Rio Ave (II)	Estádio Municipal José Bento Pessoa, Figueira da Foz
15:00	Marcelinho 76', 104'; Elivélton 120'		Mateus 67'	Referee: Paulo Baptista

10 February 2008	Vitória de Setúbal (I)	1–1 (a.e.t.) (4–1 p)	Vitória de Guimarães (I)	Estádio do Bonfim, Setúbal
15:00	Pitbull 3'		João Alves 23'	Referee: Pedro Henriques
	Penalties
	Auri (penalty scored); Pitbull (penalty scored); Elias (penalty scored); Jorginho (penalty scored)		(penalty missed) Ghilas; (penalty scored) Fajardo; (penalty missed) Mrdaković

10 February 2008	Benfica (I)	4–1	Paços de Ferreira (I)	Estádio da Luz, Lisbon
20:45	Cardozo 40' (pen.), 52' (pen.); Costa 77'; Assis 90'		Pedrinha 2'	Referee: Augusto Duarte

== Quarter-finals ==
Ties were played on the 27 February.

27 February 2008	Naval (I)	1–2	Vitória de Setúbal (I)	Estádio Municipal José Bento Pessoa, Figueira da Foz
15:00 WET	Paulão 64'		Branco 59'; Robson 69'	Referee: Jorge Sousa

27 February 2008	Benfica (I)	2–0	Moreirense (II)	Estádio da Luz, Lisbon
19:45 WET	Costa 70'; Makukula 87'			Attendance: 10,494; Referee: Elmano Santos

27 February 2008	Sporting CP (I)	1–0	Estrela da Amadora (I)	Estádio José Alvalade, Lisbon
20:45 WET	Purović 90+2'			Attendance: 7,475; Referee: Duarte Gomes

27 February 2008	Porto (I)	1–0	Gil Vicente (II)	Estádio do Dragão, Lisbon
WET	Sektioui 22'			Attendance: 12,117; Referee: Paulo Pereira

== Semi-finals ==
Ties were played on the 15–16 April.

15 April 2008	Vitória de Setúbal (I)	0–3	Porto (I)	Estádio do Bonfim, Setúbal
20:30 WEST			Jorginho 37' (o.g.); González 51', 60'	Referee: Pedro Proença

16 April 2008	Sporting CP (I)	5–3	Benfica (I)	Estádio José Alvalade, Lisbon
20:30 WEST	Djaló 68', 84'; Liédson 76'; Derlei 79'; Vukčević 90+3'		Costa 19'; Nuno Gomes 31'; C. Rodríguez 82'	Attendance: 37,204; Referee: Jorge Sousa

== Final ==
18 May 2008
17:00 WEST

Porto	0–2 (a.e.t.)	Sporting CP
		Tiuí 111', 117'

Estádio Nacional, Oeiras
Attendance: 37,600
Referee: Olegário Benquerença (Leiria)
