= 2009–10 Sporting CP season =

Sporting CP
2009–10 season
- Manager: Paulo Bento (until 6 November 2009); Leonel Pontes^{1} (from 6 November 2009 to 15 November 2009); Carlos Carvalhal (from 15 November 2009)
- Liga Sagres: 4th
- Cup of Portugal Millennium: Quarter-finals
- Carlsberg Cup: Semi-finals
- UEFA Champions League: Play-off round
- UEFA Europa League: Round of 16
- Top goalscorer: League: Liédson (13); All: Liédson (22)

The 2009–10 season was Sporting Clube de Portugal's 76th season in the top flight, the Liga Sagres. This article shows player statistics and all matches (official and friendly) that the club have and will play during the 2009–10 season.

== Squad ==
=== First team squad ===
As of 1 January 2010.

Note: Flags indicate national team as defined under FIFA eligibility rules; some limited exceptions apply. Players may hold more than one non-FIFA nationality.

No.	Pos.	Nation	Player
1	GK	POR	Rui Patrício
2	MF	POR	Pedro Mendes
3	DF	POR	Daniel Carriço
4	DF	BRA	Ânderson Polga (vice-captain 2nd)
5	DF	BRA	Pedro Silva
6	MF	POR	Adrien Silva
7	MF	RUS	Marat Izmailov
9	FW	POR	Carlos Saleiro
10	MF	MNE	Simon Vukčević
12	DF	POR	Marco Caneira
13	DF	POR	Tonel
14	MF	CHI	Matías Fernández
16	GK	POR	Tiago Ferreira (vice-captain 3rd)

No.	Pos.	Nation	Player
18	DF	ARG	Leandro Grimi
19	GK	POR	Ricardo Batista
20	FW	POR	Yannick Djaló
21	DF	POR	João Pereira
22	FW	FRA	Florent Sinama Pongolle
23	FW	POR	Hélder Postiga
24	MF	POR	Miguel Veloso
25	MF	POR	Bruno Pereirinha
28	MF	POR	João Moutinho (captain)
30	DF	MOZ	Mexer
31	FW	POR	Liédson
78	DF	POR	Abel

=== Youth Squad ===
Note: Flags indicate national team as defined under FIFA eligibility rules; some limited exceptions apply. Players may hold more than one non-FIFA nationality.

No.	Pos.	Nation	Player
—	GK	POR	Ruben Luís (a)
—	GK	POR	João Figueiredo (a)
—	GK	POR	Luís Ribeiro
—	DF	BRA	Matheus Silva (a)
—	DF	POR	André Oliveira
—	DF	POR	Leandro Albano
—	DF	POR	João Freitas
—	DF	POR	Miguel Serôdio (a)
—	DF	ARG	Nacho Ameli
—	DF	POR	Nuno Reis (a)
—	DF	POR	Cédric (a)
—	MF	GNB	Zezinho
—	MF	POR	Ari Oliveira
—	MF	POR	Luís Almeida (a)

No.	Pos.	Nation	Player
—	MF	POR	João Oliveira
—	MF	USA	Gregory Garza (a)
—	MF	BRA	Renato Neto (a)
—	MF	POR	William Carvalho
—	MF	ARG	Alexis Quintulén
—	MF	POR	Afonso Taira (a)
—	FW	POR	Henrique Gomes
—	FW	POR	Amido Baldé (a)
—	FW	POR	Danilo Serrano (a)
—	FW	POR	Alex Zahavi (a)
—	FW	POR	Renato Santos (a)
—	FW	BRA	Matheus Coelho (a)
—	FW	POR	Peter Caraballo (a)

(a) According to LPFP

=== UEFA Europa League squad ===
As of 14 September 2009.

Note: Flags indicate national team as defined under FIFA eligibility rules; some limited exceptions apply. Players may hold more than one non-FIFA nationality.

No.	Pos.	Nation	Player
1	GK	POR	Rui Patrício
2	MF	POR	Pedro Mendes
3	DF	POR	Daniel Carriço
4	DF	BRA	Ânderson Polga (vice-captain 2nd)
5	DF	BRA	Pedro Silva
6	MF	POR	Adrien Silva
7	MF	RUS	Marat Izmailov
9	FW	POR	Carlos Saleiro
10	MF	MNE	Simon Vukčević
12	DF	POR	Marco Caneira
13	DF	POR	Tonel
14	MF	CHI	Matías Fernández
16	GK	POR	Tiago Ferreira (vice-captain 3rd)
18	DF	ARG	Leandro Grimi
19	GK	POR	Ricardo Batista
20	FW	POR	Yannick Djaló
23	FW	POR	Hélder Postiga
24	MF	POR	Miguel Veloso

No.	Pos.	Nation	Player
25	MF	POR	Bruno Pereirinha
28	MF	POR	João Moutinho (captain)
30	DF	MOZ	Mexer
31	FW	POR	Liédson
40	MF	POR	Alex Zahavi (from List B)
41	DF	POR	Cédric (from List B)
43	MF	POR	Luís Almeida (from List B)
44	DF	POR	Nuno Reis (from List B)
46	MF	BRA	Renato Neto (from List B)
47	FW	POR	Renato Santos (from List B)
50	GK	POR	Ruben Luís (from List B)
51	FW	POR	Peter Caraballo (from List B)
52	DF	POR	Miguel Serôdio (from List B)
53	MF	POR	Danilo Serrano (from List B)
54	MF	POR	Afonso Taira (from List B)
56	GK	POR	João Figueiredo (from List B)
78	DF	POR	Abel

List B Players included in UEFA

== Transfers ==
=== In ===
==== Summer ====
Num	Pos	Player	From	Fee	Date
55	DF	(Portugal) André Marques	Vitória de Setúbal	Loan return	
9	FW	(Portugal) Carlos Saleiro	Académica de Coimbra	Loan return	
14	MF	(Chile) Matías Fernández	Villarreal	€3.635M	1 July 2009
11	DF	(Ecuador) Felipe Caicedo	Manchester City	On loan	25 July 2009
17	MF	(Spain) Miguel Ángel Angulo	Valencia	Free transfer	30 August 2009

==== Winter ====
Num	Pos	Player	From	Fee	Date
30	DF	(Mozambique) Mexer	Desportivo de Maputo	€0.166M	15 December 2009
21	DF	(Portugal) João Pereira	Braga	€3M	22 December 2009
22	FW	(France) Florent Sinama Pongolle	Atlético Madrid	€6.5M	28 December 2009
2	DF	(Portugal) Pedro Mendes	Rangers	€1.3M	30 January 2010

Total spending: ▼€10.966 million

=== Out ===
==== Summer ====
Num	Pos	Player	To	Fee	Date
30	MF	(Argentina) Leandro Romagnoli	San Lorenzo	Mutual agreement	6 August 2009
8	MF	(Brazil) Fábio Rochemback	Grêmio	Free transfer	31 August 2009
11	FW	(Brazil) Derlei	Vitória	End of contract	
22	FW	(Brazil) Rodrigo Tiuí	Atlético Paranaense	Free transfer	
	GK	(Portugal) André Filipe Martins	Igreja Nova	End of contract (loan return from Casa Pia)	
	DF	(Portugal) Tiago Pinto	Braga	End of contract (loan return from Trofense)	
	MF	(Portugal) Zezinando	Estrela da Amadora	End of contract (loan return from Real Massamá)	
	MF	(Portugal) Celestino	Belenenses	End of contract (loan return from Estrela da Amadora)	
	MF	(Portugal) João Martins	Braga	End of contract (loan return from Atlético CP)	
	MF	(Brazil) Celsinho	Portuguesa	End of contract (loan return from Estrela da Amadora)	
	FW	(Portugal) Bruno Matias	Estoril	End of contract (loan return from Fátima)	
	FW	(Portugal) Ricardo Nogueira	Montalegre	End of contract (loan return from Oriental)	
	FW	(Paraguay) Luis Paéz	Tacuary	End of contract (loan return from Fátima)	

==== Winter ====
Num	Pos	Player	To	Fee	Date
17	MF	(Spain) Miguel Ángel Angulo		Mutual agreement	5 December 2009
11	FW	(Ecuador) Felipe Caicedo	Manchester City	Loan return	12 January 2010

Total income: ▲€0 million

=== Loaned out ===
Num	Pos	Player	To	Return Date
	GK	(Serbia) Vladimir Stojković	Wigan Athletic	End of season
	GK	(Brazil) Victor Golas	Real Massamá	End of season
	DF	(Brazil) Ronny	União de Leiria	End of season
55	DF	(Portugal) André Marques	Iraklis	End of season
	DF	(Portugal) João Gonçalves	Olhanense	End of season
	DF	(Portugal) Paulo Renato	Estrela da Amadora	End of season
	MF	(Portugal) André Santos	União de Leiria	End of season
	MF	(Portugal) Diogo Amado	Odivelas	End of season
	MF	(Portugal) André Martins	Real Massamá	End of season
	MF	(Portugal) Fábio Paím	Real Massamá	End of season
	MF	(Portugal) Diogo Rosado	Real Massamá	End of season
	MF	(Portugal) Marco Matias	Real Massamá	End of season
	MF	(Nigeria) Rabiu Ibrahim	Real Massamá	End of season
	MF	(Ghana) William Owusu	Gil Vicente	End of season
	FW	(Portugal) Wilson Eduardo	Portimonense	End of season
	FW	(Portugal) Rui Fonte	Vitória de Setúbal	End of season
	FW	(Montenegro) Milan Purović	Olimpja	End of season

== Statistics ==
=== Appearances and goals ===
Last updated on 10 May.

No.	Pos	Nat	Player	Total		Liga Sagres		UEFA Europa League		Taça de Portugal		Carlsberg Cup	
No.	Pos	Nat	Player	Apps	Goals	Apps	Goals	Apps	Goals	Apps	Goals	Apps	Goals
1	GK	(Portugal) POR	Rui Patrício	47	0	30	0	10	0	3	0	4	0
2	MF	(Portugal) POR	Pedro Mendes	16	1	11	0	4	1	0	0	1	0
3	DF	(Portugal) POR	Daniel Carriço	40	2	25	1	8	0	3	1	4	0
4	DF	(Brazil) BRA	Ânderson Polga (vice-captain 2nd)	23	1	15	0	5	1	2	0	1	0
5	DF	(Brazil) BRA	Pedro Silva	16	1	7	1	5	0	2	0	2	0
6	MF	(Portugal) POR	Adrien Silva	24	1	13	0	4	1	3	0	4	0
7	MF	(Russia) RUS	Marat Izmailov	23	2	13	1	5	0	2	1	3	0
9	FW	(Portugal) POR	Carlos Saleiro	30	5	17	2	6	1	4	1	3	1
10	MF	(Montenegro) MNE	Simon Vukčević	24	2	14	1	6	0	3	1	1	0
11	FW	(Ecuador) ECU	Felipe Caicedo*	9	0	7	0	2	0	0	0	0	0
12	DF	(Portugal) POR	Marco Caneira	11	0	7	0	3	0	1	0	0	0
13	DF	(Portugal) POR	Tonel	37	1	23	1	8	0	3	0	3	0
14	MF	(Chile) CHI	Matías Fernández	43	5	28	3	9	1	3	1	3	0
16	GK	(Portugal) POR	Tiago Ferreira (vice-captain 3rd)	1	0	0	0	0	0	1	0	0	0
17	MF	(Spain) ESP	Miguel Ángel Angulo*	9	0	4	0	3	0	2	0	0	0
18	DF	(Argentina) ARG	Leandro Grimi	36	2	20	1	8	1	4	0	4	0
19	GK	(Portugal) POR	Ricardo Batista	0	0	0	0	0	0	0	0	0	0
20	FW	(Portugal) POR	Yannick Djaló	27	7	18	6	4	0	1	1	4	0
21	DF	(Portugal) POR	João Pereira	16	2	12	1	0	0	1	0	3	1
22	FW	(France) FRA	Florent Sinama Pongolle	7	1	5	1	0	0	1	0	1	0
23	FW	(Portugal) POR	Hélder Postiga	30	1	22	1	4	0	2	0	2	0
24	MF	(Portugal) POR	Miguel Veloso	41	10	25	3	10	3	3	2	3	2
25	MF	(Portugal) POR	Bruno Pereirinha	27	0	17	0	5	0	3	0	2	0
28	MF	(Portugal) POR	João Moutinho (captain)	46	8	28	5	10	1	4	2	4	0
30	DF	(Mozambique) MOZ	Mexer	0	0	0	0	0	0	0	0	0	0
31	FW	(Portugal) POR	Liédson	42	22	28	13	9	4	3	3	2	2

Note's:

- * = Player is no longer with the club but still made an appearance during the season.

== Club ==
=== Coaching staff ===
Position	Staff
Head coach	(Portugal) Carlos Carvalhal
Assistant coach	(Portugal) Rifa (Paulo Sampaio)
Assistant coach	(Portugal) João Mário
Assistant coach	(Portugal) José Lima
Goalkeepers coach	(Portugal) Vítor Silvestre

Source: sporting.pt

=== Kit ===
Supplier: Puma
Sponsor(s): TMN, Meo, Super Bock

Home	Away	Stromp	Goalkeeper home	Goalkeeper Away	Goalkeeper Away

Source: sporting.pt

== Competitions ==
=== Overall ===
Competition	Started round	Current position / round	Final position / round	First match	Last match
Liga Sagres	—	4/16		15 August 2009	9 May 2010
UEFA Champions League	Third qualifying round	—	eliminated	18 August 2009	26 August 2009
UEFA Europa League	Group stage	—	Round of 16	17 September 2009	18 March 2010
Taça de Portugal	Third Round	—	Quarterfinals	18 October 2009	2 February 2010
Carlsberg Cup	Third Round	—	Semifinals	3 January 2010	9 February 2010

Updated to match played 25 March 2010
Source: Competitions

=== Liga Sagres ===
==== Standings ====
Pos	Team	Pld	W	D	L	GF	GA	GD	Pts	Qualification or relegation
2	Braga	30	22	5	3	48	20	+28	71	Qualification to Champions League third qualifying round
3	Porto	30	21	5	4	70	26	+44	68	Qualification to Europa League play-off round (Note: Porto qualified for the play-off round of 2010–11 UEFA Europa League after winning the 2009–10 Taça de Portugal.)
4	Sporting CP	30	13	9	8	42	26	+16	48	Qualification to Europa League third qualifying round
5	Marítimo	30	11	8	11	42	43	−1	41 (Note: Marítimo ahead of Vitória de Guimarães on head-to-head record; Vitória de Guimarães–Marítimo 1–2, Marítimo–Vitória de Guimarães 0–1.)	Qualification to Europa League second qualifying round
6	Vitória de Guimarães	30	11	8	11	31	34	−3	41	

Source: LPFP
Rules for classification: 1) points; 2) head-to-head points; 3) head-to-head goal difference; 4) head-to-head goals scored; 5) goal difference; 6) number of goals scored.

==== Results summary ====
Overall								Home						Away					
Pld	W	D	L	GF	GA	GD	Pts	W	D	L	GF	GA	GD	W	D	L	GF	GA	GD
30	13	9	8	42	26	+16	48	8	3	4	24	13	+11	5	6	4	18	13	+5

Last updated: 10 May 2010.
Source: Competitive Matches

==== Results by round ====
Round	1	2	3	4	5	6	7	8	9	10	11	12	13	14	15	16	17	18	19	20	21	22	23	24	25	26	27	28	29	30
Ground	A	H	A	H	H	A	H	A	H	A	H	A	H	A	H	H	A	H	A	A	H	A	H	A	H	A	H	A	H	A
Result	D	L	W	W	W	L	D	D	D	D	D	W	L	W	W	W	L	L	D	D	W	W	W	L	W	L	W	D	L	W
Position	2	10	6	5	4	5	4	4	7	8	6	6	7	5	4	4	4	4	4	4	4	4	4	4	4	4	4	4	4	4

Updated to match(es) played on 10 May 2010. Source: Competitive Matches
A = Away; H = Home; W = Win; D = Draw; L = Loss

=== UEFA Champions League ===
==== Play-off round ====
Team 1	Agg.	Team 2	1st leg	2nd leg
Sporting CP (Portugal)	3–3 (a)	(Italy) Fiorentina	2–2	1–1

Last updated: 28 February.
Source: UEFA Champions League

=== UEFA Europa League ===
==== Group D ====
Pos	Team	Pld	W	D	L	GF	GA	GD	Pts	Qualification	SCP	HER	HVN	VEN
1	(Portugal) Sporting CP	6	3	2	1	8	6	+2	11	Advance to knockout phase	—	1–0	1–1	1–1
2	(Germany) Hertha BSC	6	3	1	2	6	5	+1	10	Advance to knockout phase	1–0	—	0–1	1–1
3	(Netherlands) Heerenveen	6	2	2	2	11	7	+4	8		2–3	2–3	—	5–0
4	(Latvia) Ventspils	6	0	3	3	3	10	−7	3		1–2	0–1	0–0	—

Source: Soccerway

===== Results by round =====
Round	1	2	3	4	5	6
Ground	A	H	A	H	H	A
Result	W	W	W	D	D	L
Position	1	1	1	1	1	1

Updated to match(es) played on 28 February 2010. Source: Competitive Matches
A = Away; H = Home; W = Win; D = Draw; L = Loss

==== Round of 32 ====
Team 1	Agg.	Team 2	1st leg	2nd leg
Everton (England)	2–4	(Portugal) Sporting CP	2–1	0–3

Last updated: 28 February.
Source: UEFA Europa League

==== Round of 16 ====
Team 1	Agg.	Team 2	1st leg	2nd leg
Sporting CP (Portugal)	2–2 (a)	(Spain) Atlético Madrid	0–0	2–2

Last updated: 28 February.
Source: UEFA Europa League

=== Carlsberg Cup ===
==== Group B ====
Pos	Team	Pld	W	D	L	GF	GA	GD	Pts	Qualification
1	Sporting CP	3	3	0	0	5	2	+3	9	Advance to knockout phase
2	Trofense	3	1	1	1	2	2	0	4	
3	Braga	3	1	0	2	5	4	+1	3	
4	União de Leiria	3	0	1	2	3	7	−4	1	

==== Knock-out stage ====
===== Semi-finals =====
9 February 2010
20:15 UTC

Sporting CP	1–4	Benfica
Liédson 37'	Report	David Luiz 8'; Ramires 29'; Luisão 68'; Cardozo 90+4'

Estádio José Alvalade, Lisbon
Attendance: 20,000
Referee: Olegário Benquerença

=== Competitive ===
Win Tie Loss

==== Liga Sagres ====
Kickoff times are in UTC+0.

15 August 2009 1	Nacional	1–1	Sporting CP	Estádio da Madeira, Funchal
19:15	Aurélio 26'; Rúben Micael (yellow card) 42'	(Report)	Moutinho (yellow card) 24'; Aurélio 75' (o.g.); Polga (yellow card) 71'	Attendance: 3,877; Referee: Pedro Proença

22 August 2009 2	Sporting CP	1–2	Braga	Estádio José Alvalade, Lisbon
21:15	Carriço (yellow card) 45'; Liédson (yellow card) 51'; Djaló 70'	(Report)	Alan 11'; Mossoró (yellow card) 32'; Viana (yellow card) 32'; Eduardo (yellow card) 52'; Rodríguez (yellow card) 53'; Meyong 80'	Attendance: 24,280; Referee: Olegário Benquerença

30 August 2009 3	Académica	0–2	Sporting CP	Estádio José Alvalade, Lisbon
20:15	Pedro (yellow card) 26' (yellow-red card) 75'; Fontes (yellow card) 35'	(Report)	P. Silva (yellow card) 51'; Marques (yellow card) 53'; Moutinho (yellow card) 57'; Liédson 64'; Veloso (yellow card) 66'; Carriço (yellow card) 77'; Djaló 84'	Attendance: 24,280; Referee: Olegário Benquerença

13 September 2009 4	Sporting CP	1–0	Paços de Ferreira	Estádio José Alvalade, Lisbon
20:15	Marques (yellow card) 17'; Veloso (yellow card) 27'; Vukčević (yellow card) 30'; Liédson 80'	(Report)	Ozéia (yellow card) 30'; Ricardo (yellow card) 34'; Baiano (yellow card) 41' (red card) 90+3'; Ciel (yellow card) 43'; Pedrinha (yellow card) 77'; Pacheco (yellow card) 78' (yellow-red card) 86'; Cristiano (yellow card) 87'	Attendance: 23,319; Referee: Bruno Paixão

21 September 2009 5	Sporting CP	3–2	Olhanense	Estádio José Alvalade, Lisbon
20:15	Carriço 35'; Moutinho 42'; Caicedo (yellow card) 77'; Vukčević 86'	(Report)	Rabiola 9'; Castro 18'; Anselmo (yellow card) 40'; Garcia (yellow card) 43'; Duarte (yellow card) 52'	Attendance: 24,205; Referee: Rui Costa

26 September 2009 6	Porto	1–0	Sporting CP	Estádio do Dragão, Porto
19:15	Falcao 3'; Meireles (yellow card) 12'; Fucile (yellow card) 56'; Alves (yellow card) 65'; Costa (yellow card) 78'	(Report)	Veloso (yellow card) 25' (yellow-red card) 90+2'; Polga (yellow card) 34' (yellow-red card) 52'; Abel (yellow card) 36'	Attendance: 46,511; Referee: Duarte Gomes

4 October 2009 7	Sporting CP	0–0	Belenenses	Estádio José Alvalade, Lisbon
18:00		(Report)	Gómez (yellow card) 19'; Zé Pedro (yellow card) 58'; Celestino (yellow card) 70'; Barge (yellow card) 83'	Attendance: 24,581; Referee: Carlos Xistra

27 October 2009 8	Vitória de Guimarães	1–1	Sporting CP	Estádio D. Afonso Henriques, Guimarães
20:15	Alex (yellow card) 66'; Nilson (yellow card) 82'; Meireles (yellow card) 84'; Rui Miguel 90+3'	(Report)	Grimi (yellow card) 19'; Abel (yellow card) 40'; Moutinho (yellow card) 73'; Tonel (yellow card) 84'; Fernández 82'; Saleiro (yellow card) 89'	Attendance: 18,105; Referee: Olegário Benquerença

1 November 2009 9	Sporting CP	1–1	Marítimo	Estádio José Alvalade, Lisbon
20:15	Postiga (yellow card) 13'; Veloso (yellow card) 24'; P. Silva (yellow card) 43'; Fernández 52'; Carriço (yellow card) 59'	(Report)	Fernando (yellow card) 48'; Sousa (yellow card) 51'; Manú 61'; Peçanha (yellow card) 90+4'	Attendance: 22,857; Referee: Cosme Machado

8 November 2009 10	Rio Ave	2–2	Sporting CP	Estádio do Rio Ave FC, Vila do Conde
20:15	Tomás 56', 60'	(Report)	Fernández 20'; Carriço (yellow card) 43' (yellow-red card) 64'; Moutinho 45'; Marques (yellow card) 90+4'	Attendance: 3,385; Referee: Artur Soares Dias

28 November 2009 11	Sporting CP	0–0	Benfica	Estádio José Alvalade, Lisbon
21:15	Polga (yellow card) 29'; A. Silva (yellow card) 52'; Veloso (yellow card) 69'	(Report)	Di María (yellow card) 45+2'; García (yellow card) 71'; David Luiz (yellow card) 77'	Attendance: 45,880; Referee: Pedro Proença

7 December 2009 12	Vitória de Setúbal	0–2	Sporting CP	Estádio do Bonfim, Setúbal
20:15	Pinto (yellow card) 63' (yellow-red card) 64'; Zarabi (yellow card) 85'; Zoro (yellow card) 88'; Keita (yellow card) 90+2'	(Report)	Liédson 4', 87'	Attendance: 4,207; Referee: Elmano Santos

12 December 2009 13	Sporting CP	0–1	União de Leiria	Estádio José Alvalade, Lisbon
17:00	A. Silva (yellow card) 51'; Vukčević (yellow card) 62'	(Report)	Paulo Vinícius 26'; Pateiro (yellow card) 50'; Ðuričić (yellow card) 79'	Attendance: 25,693; Referee: Vasco Santos

19 December 2009 14	Naval	0–1	Sporting CP	Estádio Municipal José Bento Pessoa, Figueira da Foz
21:15	Hauw (yellow card) 52'; Godemèche (yellow card) 76'; Marinho (yellow card) 90+2'	(Report)	Carriço (yellow card) 11'; Saleiro 35'; Veloso (yellow card) 39'; A. Silva (yellow card) 51'; Abel (yellow card) 71'	Attendance: 2,167; Referee: Carlos Xistra

9 January 2010 15	Sporting CP	1–0	Leixões	Estádio José Alvalade, Lisbon
19:15	Tonel 82'	(Report)	Gallo (yellow card) 63' (yellow-red card) 69'; Espinho (yellow card) 76'	Attendance: 23,230; Referee: Paulo Baptista

16 January 2010 16	Sporting CP	3–2	Nacional	Estádio José Alvalade, Lisbon
21:15	Djaló 25'; Grimi (yellow card) 27'; Pereira (yellow card) 46'; Liédson 59', 71'	(Report)	Rúben Micael 23'; Pečnik (yellow card) 25'; Amuneke (yellow card) 53'; Lopes (yellow card) 67'; Edgar 83'; Anselmo (yellow card) 86'	Attendance: 20,056; Referee: Bruno Paixão

29 January 2010 17	Braga	1–0	Sporting CP	Estádio Municipal de Braga, Braga
20:45	Paulo César 31'; Meyong (yellow card) 55'; Mossoró (yellow card) 77'	(Report)	Carriço (yellow card) 36'; A. Silva (yellow card) 44'; Veloso (yellow card) 61'; Saleiro (yellow card) 65'; Polga (yellow card) 85'	Attendance: 14,761; Referee: João Ferreira

6 February 2010 18	Sporting CP	1–2	Académica	Estádio José Alvalade, Lisbon
19:15	Moutinho 23'	(Report)	Orlando 2'; Ribeiro 58'; Sougou (yellow card) 85'	Attendance: 20,060; Referee: Pedro Henriques

12 February 2010 19	Paços de Ferreira	0–0	Sporting CP	Estádio da Mata Real, Paços de Ferreira
20:15	Ozéia (yellow card) 83'	(Report)	Liédson (yellow card) 23'	Attendance: 1,401; Referee: Duarte Gomes

20 February 2010 20	Olhanense	0–0	Sporting CP	Estádio José Arcanjo, Olhão
21:15	Gonçalves (yellow card) 77'	(Report)	Carriço (yellow card) 21'; Djaló (yellow card) 31'; Veloso (yellow card) 69'; Postiga (yellow card) 79'; Abel (yellow card) 85'	Attendance: 3,801; Referee: Pedro Proença

28 February 2010 21	Sporting CP	3–0	Porto	Estádio José Alvalade, Lisbon
20:15	Djaló 5', (yellow card) 29'; Veloso (yellow card) 11', (goal) 46'; Moutinho (yellow card) 15'; Izmailov 45', (yellow card) 77'; Liédson (yellow card) 78'	(Report)	Alves (yellow card) 16'; Costa (yellow card) 45'; Belluschi (yellow card) 73'; Helton (yellow card) 75'; Pereira (yellow card) 89'	Attendance: 28,220; Referee: João Ferreira

7 March 2010 22	Belenenses	0–4	Sporting CP	Estádio do Restelo, Lisbon
	Fredy (yellow card) 70'	(Report)	Liédson 50', 60', 80', 88'; Tiago (yellow card) 54'	Attendance: 5,664; Referee: Hugo Miguel

14 March 2010 23	Sporting CP	3–1	Vitória de Guimarães	Estádio José Alvalade, Lisbon
	Grimi 8'; Liédson 9', (yellow card) 70'; Veloso (yellow card) 55'; Moutinho (yellow card) 81'; Tonel (yellow card) 88'	(Report)	Valdomiro (yellow card) 53', (goal) 66'; Moreno (yellow card) 60'; Gustavo (yellow card) 72'	Attendance: 35,007; Referee: Bruno Paixão

28 March 2010 24	Marítimo	3–2	Sporting CP	Estádio dos Barreiros, Funchal
20:15	Tchô 16'; Rafael Miranda (yellow card) 65'; João Guilherme (yellow card) 70', (goal) 81'; Pitbull 90'; Diakité (yellow card) 90+2'	(Report)	Pereira 36'; Pereirinha (yellow card) 90'; Sinama Pongolle 90+4'	Attendance: 4,023; Referee: Vasco Santos

3 April 2010 25	Sporting CP	5–0	Rio Ave	Estádio José Alvalade, Lisbon
	Djaló 6', 56', 75'; Liédson 34'; Carriço (yellow card) 51'; Moutinho 66'; Izmailov (red card) 83'	(Report)	Gomes (yellow card) 38'; Vilas Boas (yellow card) 50'; Faria (yellow card) 62'	Attendance: 16,406; Referee: Pedro Proença

11 April 2010 26	Benfica	2–0	Sporting CP	Estádio da Luz, Lisbon
20:45	Luisão (yellow card) 47'; Coentrão (yellow card) 55'; Cardozo 67'; Di María (yellow card) 76'; Aimar 79'	(Report)	Patrício (yellow card) 41'; Abel (yellow card) 45'; Carriço (yellow card) 45'	Attendance: 59,317; Referee: João Ferreira

18 April 2010 27	Sporting CP	2–1	Vitória de Setúbal	Estádio José Alvalade, Lisbon
20:15	Fernández (yellow card) 47'; Moutinho 60'; Postiga 70'	(Report)	Collin 10', (yellow card) 59'	Attendance: 19,187; Referee: Jorge Sousa

25 April 2010 28	União de Leiria	1–1	Sporting CP	Estádio Dr. Magalhães Pessoa, Leiria
20h:15	Cássio 48'; Paulo Vinícius (yellow card) 66'; Diego Gaúcho (yellow card) 83'	(Report)	Fernández (yellow card) 8'; Liédson 15'; Carriço (yellow card) 8'	Attendance: 4,365; Referee: Marco Ferreira

2 May 2010 29	Sporting CP	0–1	Naval	Estádio José Alvalade, Lisbon
20:15	Carriço (yellow card) 78'; Pereira (yellow card) 80'; Tonel (yellow card) 89'	(Report)	Diego Ângelo (yellow card) 55'; Fábio Júnior 64'	Attendance: 16,102; Referee: André Gralha

9 May 2010 30	Leixões	1–2	Sporting CP	Estádio do Mar, Matosinhos
21:15	Braga (yellow card) 23'; Seabra (yellow card) 46'; João Paulo 81'	(Report)	Grimi (yellow card) 6'; Veloso 15', (yellow card) 90+2'; P. Silva 54', (yellow card) 60'; Djaló (yellow card) 90+1'	Attendance: 2,595; Referee: Elmano Santos

==== UEFA Champions League ====
Play-off round

18 August 2009 First leg	Sporting CP (Portugal)	2–2	(Italy) Fiorentina	Estádio José Alvalade, Lisbon
20:45 CEST	Vukčević 58', (yellow card) 12' (yellow-red card) 58'; Veloso 66'	(Report)	Vargas 6'; Gamberini (yellow card) 12'; Zanetti (yellow card) 15'; Dainelli (yellow card) 15'; Gilardino 79'	Attendance: 27,602; Referee: Viktor Kassai (Hungary)

26 August 2009 Second leg	Fiorentina (Italy)	1–1	(Portugal) Sporting CP	Stadio Artemio Franchi, Florence
20:45 CET	Comotto (yellow card) 33'; Jovetić 54', (yellow card) 68'; Zanetti (yellow card) 60'	(Report)	Moutinho 35'; P. Silva (yellow card) 49'; Marques (yellow card) 70'; Caneira (yellow card) 90+2'	Attendance: 30,821; Referee: Howard Webb (England)

Fiorentina 3–3 Sporting CP on aggregate. Fiorentina won on away goals.

==== UEFA Europa League ====
Kickoff times are in CET.

Group Stage

Pos	Team	Pld	W	D	L	GF	GA	GD	Pts	Qualification	SCP	HER	HVN	VEN
1	(Portugal) Sporting CP	6	3	2	1	8	6	+2	11	Advance to knockout phase	—	1–0	1–1	1–1
2	(Germany) Hertha BSC	6	3	1	2	6	5	+1	10	Advance to knockout phase	1–0	—	0–1	1–1
3	(Netherlands) Heerenveen	6	2	2	2	11	7	+4	8		2–3	2–3	—	5–0
4	(Latvia) Ventspils	6	0	3	3	3	10	−7	3		1–2	0–1	0–0	—

Source: Soccerway

17 September 2009 1	Heerenveen (Netherlands)	2–3	(Portugal) Sporting CP	Abe Lenstra Stadion, Heerenveen
19:00	Sibon 12'; Dingsdag 77'; Assaidi (yellow card) 79'	(Report)	Liédson 17', 40', 88'; Veloso (yellow card) 66'	Attendance: 26,000; Referee: Aleksei Nikolaev (Russia)

1 October 2009 2	Sporting CP (Portugal)	1–0	(Germany) Hertha BSC	Estádio José Alvalade, Lisbon
21:05	A. Silva 18', (yellow card) 32' (yellow-red card) 90+3'; Fernández (yellow card) 20'; Moutinho (yellow card) 34'	(Report)	Pejčinović (yellow card) 16'; Wichniarek (yellow card) 30'; Kaká (yellow card) 45+1'; Janker (yellow card) 73'; Raffael (yellow card) 85'	Attendance: 16,197; Referee: Serge Gumienny (Belgium)

22 October 2009 3	Ventspils (Latvia)	1–2	(Portugal) Sporting CP	Skonto stadions, Riga
21:05	Laizāns 64' (pen.)	(Report)	Veloso 6'; Moutinho 85'; Angulo (yellow card) 88'; Liédson (yellow card) 90'	Attendance: 4,500; Referee: Sascha Kever (Switzerland)

5 November 2009 4	Sporting CP (Portugal)	1–1	(Latvia) Ventspils	Estádio José Alvalade, Lisbon
19:00	Marques (yellow card) 14'; Saleiro 22'; Fernández (yellow card) 60'; P. Silva (yellow card) 81'	(Report)	Zamperini 15'; Žigajevs (yellow card) 45'	Attendance: 18,103; Referee: Aleksandar Stavrev (North Macedonia)

3 December 2009 5	Sporting CP (Portugal)	1–1	(Netherlands) Heerenveen	Estádio José Alvalade, Lisbon
21:05	Liédson (yellow card) 52'; Grimi 90+1'	(Report)	Assaidi 47'; Popov (yellow card) 67'; Elm (yellow card) 78'	Attendance: 12,204; Referee: Pavel Královec (Czech Republic)

16 December 2009 6	Hertha BSC (Germany)	1–0	(Portugal) Sporting CP	Olympic Stadium, Berlin
19:00	Kačar 70', (yellow card) 71'	(Report)	Carriço (yellow card) 42'; Saleiro (yellow card) 82'	Attendance: 14,417; Referee: Aleksei Kulbakov (Belarus)

Round of 32

16 February 2010 First leg	Everton (England)	2–1	(Portugal) Sporting CP	Goodison Park, Liverpool, England
18:45	Pienaar 35'; Distin 49', (red card) 86'	(Report)	Moutinho (yellow card) 54'; Carriço (yellow card) 74'; Veloso 87' (pen.)	Attendance: 28,131; Referee: Darko Čeferin (Slovenia)

25 February 2010 Second leg	Sporting CP (Portugal)	3–0	(England) Everton	Estádio José Alvalade, Lisbon
21:05	Veloso 64'; Mendes 76'; Abel (yellow card) 81'; Fernández 90+4'	(Report)	Pienaar (yellow card) 74'	Attendance: 17,609; Referee: Alon Yefet (Israel)

Sporting CP won 4–2 on aggregate. Round of 16

11 March 2010 First leg	Atlético Madrid (Spain)	0–0	(Portugal) Sporting CP	Vicente Calderón, Madrid
19:00	Ujfaluši (yellow card) 81'	Report	Grimi (yellow card) 9' (yellow-red card) 31'; Veloso (yellow card) 53'; Pereirinha (yellow card) 60'; Tonel (red card) 89'; Saleiro (yellow card) 90+4'	Attendance: 42,000; Referee: Pieter Vink (Netherlands)

18 March 2010 Second leg	Sporting CP (Portugal)	2–2	(Spain) Atlético Madrid	Estádio José Alvalade, Lisbon
21:05	Liédson 19'; Polga 45+1', (yellow card) 80'; P. Silva (yellow card) 51'; Abel (yellow card) 76'	Report	Agüero 3', 33'	Referee: Knut Kircher (Germany)

Atlético Madrid won 2–2 on aggregate from the away goals rule.

=== Pre-season and friendlies ===
4 July 2009	(Portugal) Sporting CP	3–0	(Portugal) Atlético Cacém	Alcochete
10h15	Postiga 21'; Fernández 62', 66'			Stadium: Académia Sporting/Puma; Attendance: 1,000

11 July 2009	(Portugal) Sporting CP	0–1	(England) Nottingham Forest	Albufeira
21:15		(Report)	Anderson 80'	Stadium: Municipal Stadium; Referee: Bruno Paixão

18 July 2009	(Portugal) Sporting CP	1–2	(Netherlands) Feyenoord	Lisbon
19h30	Postiga 31'	(Report)	De Guzmán 47'; Makaay 50'	Stadium: Estádio José Alvalade; Referee: Hélder Malheiro

21 July 2009	(Portugal) Vitória de Guimarães	2–2	(Portugal) Sporting CP	Guimarães
21h15	Roberto 70'; Gonçalves 88'	(Report)	Fernández 46'; Postiga 58'	Stadium: Estádio D. Afonso Henriques; Referee: Artur Soares Dias
