= 2011–12 Sporting CP season =

Sporting CP
2011–12 season
- President: Luís Godinho Lopes
- Manager: Domingos Paciência & Ricardo Sá Pinto
- Stadium: Estádio José Alvalade
- Primeira Liga: 4th
- Portuguese Cup: Runners-up
- League Cup: Third round
- UEFA Europa League: Semi-finals
- Top goalscorer: League: Ricky van Wolfswinkel (14); All: Ricky van Wolfswinkel (25)

The 2011–12 season is Sporting CP's 79th season in the top flight, the Primeira Liga, known as the Liga ZON Sagres for sponsorship purposes. This article shows player statistics and all matches (official and friendly) that the club plays during the 2011–12 season.

Sporting CP's under-19 squad played in the inaugural tournament of the NextGen series.

== Players ==
=== Squad information ===
N	Pos.	Nat.	Name	Age	EU	Since	App	Goals	Ends	Transfer fee	Notes
1	GK	(Portugal)	R. Patrício	38	EU	2006	167	0	2013	Youth system	
2	DF	(Peru)	A. Rodríguez	42	EU	2011	0	0	2016	Free	
3	DF	(Portugal)	D. Carriço	38	EU	2008	116	4	2013	Youth system	
4	DF	(Brazil)	Â. Polga	47	EU	2003	305	4	2012	Free	Second nationality: Portugal
5	DF	(United States)	Onyewu	44	EU	2011	1	0	2014	Free	Second nationality: Belgium
6	LB	(Brazil)	Evaldo	44	EU	2010	51	1	2014	€ 3M	Second nationality: Brazil
7	FW	(Bulgaria)	Bojinov	40	EU	2011	2	0	2016	€2.6M	Second nationality: Italy
8	MF	(Netherlands)	Schaars	42	EU	2011	4	0	2014	€0.85M	
9	FW	(Netherlands)	v. Wolfswinkel	39	EU	2011	4	4	2016	€5.4M	
10	MF	(Russia)	Izmailov	44	Non-EU	2008	111	14	2015	€4.5M	
11	MF	(Spain)	D. Capel	38	EU	2011	0	0	2016		
12	GK	(Brazil)	M. Boeck	41	EU	2009	3	0	2016	undisclosed	Second nationality: Belgium
14	MF	(Chile)	Matías	40	Non-EU	2009	77	12	2013	€3.65M	Second nationality: Argentina
16	GK	(Portugal)	Tiago	51	EU	2001	131	0	2012	undisclosed	
17	LW	(Spain)	Jeffrén Suárez	38	EU	2011	0	0	2016	€3.75M	
18	FW	(Peru)	A. Carrillo	35	Non-EU	2011	0	0	2016	€1.2M	
19	RB	(Colombia)	Arias	34	Non-EU	2011	0	0	2016	Free	
20	FW	(Portugal)	Yannick	40	EU	2008	155	34	2013	Youth system	Second nationality: Guinea-Bissau
21	MF	(Argentina)	Rinaudo	39	EU	2011	3	0	2016	€0.525M	Second nationality: Italy
22	MF	(Uruguay)	L. Aguiar	40	EU	2011	0	0	2016	Free	Second nationality: Italy
23	FW	(Portugal)	H. Postiga	44	EU	2008	112	24	2012	€2.5M	
25	MF	(Portugal)	B. Pereirinha	38	EU	2006	129	5	2013	Youth system	
26	MF	(Portugal)	A. Santos	37	EU	2010	46	2	2014	Youth system	
28	MF	(Portugal)	A. Martins	36	EU	2009	4	0	2012	Youth system	
30	MF	(Guinea-Bissau)	Zezinho	34	EU	2011	3	0	2016	Youth system	Second nationality: Portugal
32	GK	(Brazil)	V. Golas	35	EU	2009	1	0	2012	Youth system	Second nationality: Poland
33	FW	(Chile)	D. Rubio	33	EU	2011	4	5	2016	€ 1M	Second nationality: Germany
47	RB	(Portugal)	J. Pereira	42	EU	2010 (Winter)	51	3	2014	€ 3M	
88	RB	(Portugal)	J. Gonçalves	38	EU	2007	0	0	2013	Youth system	
89	LB	(France)	A. Turan	34	EU	2011	0	0	2016	Free	Second nationality: Turkey

- Last updated: 19 July 2011
- Source: Sporting.pt, Players transfer, Wikipedia players' articles (for player numbers, appearances, and goals)
- Ordered by squad number.

=== Transfers ===
==== In ====
No.	Pos.	Nat.	Name	Age	EU	Moving from	Type	Transfer window	Ends	Transfer fee	Source
18	FW	(Peru)	André Carrillo	35	Non-EU	Alianza Lima (Peru)	Transfer	Summer	2016	€1.2M	Sporting.pt
32	GK	(Brazil)	Vítor Golas	35	EU	Boavista	Loan return	Summer	2012	N/A	
9	FW	(Netherlands)	Ricky van Wolfswinkel	39	EU	Utrecht (Netherlands)	Transfer	Summer	2016	€5.4M	Sporting.pt
2	DF	(Peru)	Alberto Rodríguez	42	EU	Braga	Transfer	Summer	2016	Free	Sporting.pt
8	MF	(Netherlands)	Stijn Schaars	42	EU	AZ (Netherlands)	Transfer	Summer	2014	€0.85M	Sporting.pt
28	MF	(Portugal)	André Martins	36	EU	Pinhalnovense	Loan return	Summer	2014	N/A	Sporting.pt
88	RB	(Portugal)	João Gonçalves	38	EU	Olhanense	Loan return	Summer	2013	N/A	
19	RB	(Colombia)	Santiago Arias	34	Non-EU	La Equidad (Colombia)	Transfer	Summer	2016	Free	Sporting.pt
5	DF	(United States)	Oguchi Onyewu	44	EU	Milan (Italy)	Transfer	Summer	2014	Free	Sporting.pt
12	GK	(Brazil)	Marcelo Boeck	41	EU	Marítimo	Transfer	Summer	2016	Undisclosed	Sporting.pt
21	MF	(Argentina)	Fabián Rinaudo	39	EU	Gimnasia y Esgrima (LP) (Argentina)	Transfer	Summer	2016	€0.525M	Sporting.pt
22	MF	(Uruguay)	Luis Aguiar	40	EU	Dynamo Moscow (Russia)	Transfer	Summer	2015	Free	Sporting.pt
33	FW	(Chile)	Diego Rubio	33	EU	Colo-Colo (Chile)	Transfer	Summer	2016	€1M	Sporting.pt
7	FW	(Bulgaria)	Valeri Bojinov	40	EU	Parma (Italy)	Transfer	Summer	2016	€2.6M	Sporting.pt, cmvm.pt
25	MF	(Portugal)	Bruno Pereirinha	38	EU	Kavala (Greece)	Loan return	Summer	2013	N/A	Sporting.pt
89	LB	(France)	Atila Turan	34	EU	Grenoble (France)	Transfer	Summer	2016	Free	
17	LW	(Spain)	Jeffrén	38	EU	Barcelona (Spain)	Transfer	Summer	2016	€3.7M	Sporting.pt
11	LW	(Spain)	Diego Capel	38	EU	Sevilla (Spain)	Transfer	Summer	2016	€3.5M	
77	MF	(Brazil)	Elias	41	Non-EU	Atlético Madrid (Spain)	Transfer	Summer	2016	€8.85M	
48	LB	(Argentina)	Emiliano Insúa	37	EU	Liverpool (England)	Transfer	Summer	2016		

Total spending: ▼€15.275 million

==== Out ====
No.	Pos.	Nat.	Name	Age	EU	Moving to	Type	Transfer window	Transfer fee	Source
	GK	(Germany)	Timo Hildebrand	47	EU		End of contract	Summer	Free	
	MF	(Brazil)	Tales	36	Non-EU	Internacional (Brazil)	Loan return	Summer	Free	
	MF	(Brazil)	Cristiano	43	EU	Beira-Mar	End of contract	Summer	Free	
	FW	(Portugal)	Rui Fonte	36	EU	Espanyol (Spain)	End of contract	Summer	Free	
	DF	(Portugal)	Nuno Coelho	40	EU	Braga	Undisclosed	Summer	N/A	
	MF	(Portugal)	Pedro Mendes	47	EU		Contract termination	Summer	N/A	
	MF	(Portugal)	Maniche	48	EU		Contract termination	Summer	N/A	Sporting.pt
	RB	(Portugal)	Abel	47	EU		End of contract	Summer	N/A	
	MF	(Portugal)	Afonso Taira	34	EU	Córdoba (Spain)	End of contract	Summer	N/A	
	GK	(Serbia)	Vladimir Stojković	43	EU	Partizan (Serbia)	Contract cancellation	Summer	Free	Sporting.pt
	DF	(Mozambique)	Mexer	39	Non-EU	Olhanense	Loan	Summer	N/A	
	FW	(Portugal)	Amido Baldé	35	EU	Cercle Brugge (Belgium)	Loan	Summer	N/A	Sporting.pt
	DF	(Portugal)	Nuno Reis	35	EU	Cercle Brugge (Belgium)	Loan	Summer	N/A	Sporting.pt
	MF	(Brazil)	Renato Neto	35	Non-EU	Cercle Brugge (Belgium)	Loan	Summer	N/A	Sporting.pt
	RB	(Portugal)	Cédric	35	EU	Académica	Loan	Summer	N/A	Sporting.pt
	MF	(Brazil)	Celsinho	38	Non-EU	Târgu Mureș (Romania)	Loan	Summer	N/A	Sporting.pt
	DF	(England)	Eric Dier	32	EU	Everton (England)	Loan	Summer	N/A	Sporting.pt
	FW	(France)	Florent Sinama Pongolle	42	EU	Saint-Étienne (France)	Loan	Summer	N/A	Sporting.pt
	LW	(Portugal)	Diogo Salomão	38	EU	Deportivo La Coruña (Spain)	Loan	Summer	N/A	Sporting.pt
	RW	(Portugal)	Wilson Eduardo	36	EU	Olhanense	Loan	Summer	N/A	
	LB	(Portugal)	André Marques	39	EU	Beira-Mar	Loan	Summer	N/A	
	DF	(Portugal)	Pedro Filipe Mendes	36	EU	Servette (Switzerland)	Loan	Summer	N/A	
	MF	(Portugal)	Adrien Silva	37	EU	Académica	Loan	Summer	N/A	
	MF	(Portugal)	Diogo Rosado	36	EU	Feirense	Loan	Summer	N/A	
	MF	(Chile)	Jaime Valdés	45	EU	Parma (Italy)	Loan	Summer	N/A	
	GK	(Portugal)	Ricardo Batista	39	EU	Olhanense	Loan	Summer	N/A	

Total income: ▲€0 million

== Club ==
=== Coaching staff ===
Position	Staff
Head coach	Ricardo Sá Pinto

=== Kit ===
Supplier: Puma
Sponsor(s): TMN, Meo, Super Bock

Home	Away	Stromp	Goalkeeper	Goalkeeper	Goalkeeper	Training	Training

Source: Home kit, Sporting.pt

== Competitions ==
=== Pre-season ===
9 July 2011 Friendly Game	Sporting CP (Portugal)	3 – 0	(Portugal) Alta de Lisboa	Alcochete, Portugal
11:00 CEST	Postiga 16'; Rubio 34', 70'	Report		Stadium: Academia Sporting

13 July 2011 Friendly Game	Presikhaaf (Netherlands)	0 – 8	(Portugal) Sporting CP	Arnhem, Netherlands
19:00 CEST		Report	Postiga 2', 6', 39'; Rubio 19'; Carriço 24'; Van Wolfswinkel 66', 72'; Bruma 67'	Stadium: Sportpark De Schuytgraaf

16 July 2011 Friendly Game	Telstar (Netherlands)	0 – 3	(Portugal) Sporting CP	Arnhem, Netherlands
18:00 CEST		Report	Postiga 34'; Rubio 65'; Van Wolfswinkel 73' (pen.)	Stadium: Sportpark De Schuytgraaf; Referee: Danny Makkelie

18 July 2011 Friendly Game	Ankaragücü (Turkey)	0 – 3	(Portugal) Sporting CP	Wezep, Netherlands
18:00 CEST		Report	Postiga 7'; Van Wolfswinkel 42' (pen.); Rubio 78' (pen.)	Stadium: Sportpark Mulderssingel

24 July 2011 2011 WFC	Sporting CP (Portugal)	2 – 1	(Italy) Juventus	Toronto, Ontario, Canada
00:00 CEST	Djaló 13', 36'	Report	Del Piero 80'	Stadium: BMO Field; Attendance: 10,028; Referee: Drew Fischer

30 July 2011 Presentation Game	Sporting CP (Portugal)	0 – 3	(Spain) Valencia	Lisbon, Portugal
19:45 CEST			Bernat 6'; Soldado 31'; Piatti 42'	Stadium: Estádio José Alvalade

5 August 2011 Ramón Carranza; Semi-final	Málaga (Spain)	3 – 1	(Portugal) Sporting CP	Cádiz, Spain
--:-- CEST				Stadium: Estadio Ramón de Carranza

6 August 2011 Ramón Carranza; Third place	Udinese (Italy)	2 – 2	(Portugal) Sporting CP	Cádiz, Spain
--:-- CEST	Badu 13'; Floro Flores 81'		Rubio 49', 92'	Stadium: Estadio Ramón de Carranza

Last updated: 28 July 2011
Source: Sporting.pt,

=== Primeira Liga ===
==== League table ====
Pos	Team	Pld	W	D	L	GF	GA	GD	Pts	Qualification or relegation
2	Benfica	30	21	6	3	66	27	+39	69	Qualification to Champions League group stage
3	Braga	30	19	5	6	59	29	+30	62	Qualification to Champions League play-off round
4	Sporting CP	30	18	5	7	47	26	+21	59	Qualification to Europa League play-off round
5	Marítimo	30	14	8	8	41	38	+3	50	Qualification to Europa League third qualifying round
6	Vitória de Guimarães	30	14	3	13	40	40	0	45	

Source: LPFP (in Portuguese)
Rules for classification: 1) Points; 2) Head-to-head points; 3) Head-to-head goal difference; 4) Head-to-head away goals scored; 5) Goal difference; 6) Matches won; 7) Goals scored; 8) Play-off.
(Note: LPFP decided that only criteria 1, 5, 6 and 7 would be applied to establish the classification during the competition.)

==== Matches ====
13 August 2011 1	Sporting CP	1 – 1	Olhanense	Lisbon
	Izmailov 76'	Report	Eduardo 30'	Stadium: Estádio José Alvalade; Attendance: 33,248; Referee: Carlos Xistra

21 August 2011 2	Beira-Mar	0 – 0	Sporting CP	Aveiro
		Report		Stadium: Estádio Municipal de Aveiro; Attendance: 15,548; Referee: Fernando Martins

28 August 2011 3	Sporting CP	2 – 3	Marítimo	Lisbon
	Izmailov 38'; Jeffrén 75'		Rafael Miranda 49'; Sami 52'; Diawara 90+1'	Stadium: Estádio José Alvalade; Attendance: 27,965; Referee: Pedro Proença

10 September 2011 4	Paços de Ferreira	2 – 3	Sporting CP	Paços de Ferreira
	Michel 5', 55'		Izmailov 75'; Elias 78'; Van Wolfswinkel 83'	Stadium: Estádio da Mata Real; Attendance: 2,896; Referee: Paulo Batista

19 September 2011 5	Rio Ave	2 – 3	Sporting CP	Vila do Conde
	Atsu 48'; Yazalde 63'		Schaars 2'; Van Wolfswinkel 3'; Onyewu 74'	Stadium: Estádio do Rio Ave FC; Attendance: 4,308; Referee: Hugo Miguel

24 September 2011 6	Sporting CP	3 – 0	Vitória de Setúbal	Lisbon
	Schaars 2'; Van Wolfswinkel 8', 15'			Stadium: Estádio José Alvalade; Attendance: 33,261; Referee: Cosme Machado

2 October 2011 7	Vitória de Guimarães	0 – 1	Sporting CP	Guimarães
			Capel 7'	Stadium: Estádio D. Afonso Henriques; Referee: Carlos Xistra

24 October 2011 8	Sporting CP	6 – 1	Gil Vicente	Lisbon
	Carriço 7'; Van Wolfswinkel 58' (pen.); Capel 62', 65'; Bojinov 79', 90+2'		Roberto 75'	Stadium: Estádio José Alvalade; Attendance: 30,103; Referee: João Capela

30 October 2011 9	Feirense	0 – 2	Sporting CP	Aveiro
			Van Wolfswinkel 64' (pen.); Schaars 77'	Stadium: Estádio Municipal de Aveiro; Attendance: 14,848; Referee: André Gralha

6 November 2011 10	Sporting CP	3 – 1	União de Leiria	Lisbon
	Fernández 8', 50'; Van Wolfswinkel 90+3' (pen.)		Djaniny 21'	Stadium: Estádio José Alvalade; Attendance: 34,214; Referee: Manuel Mota

26 November 2011 11	Benfica	1–0	Sporting CP	Lisbon
	García 42'			Stadium: Estádio da Luz; Attendance: 63,146; Referee: João Capela

10 December 2011 12	Sporting CP	1 – 0	Nacional	Lisbon
	Onyewu 22'			Stadium: Estádio José Alvalade; Attendance: 40,405; Referee: Vasco Santos

18 December 2011 13	Académica	1 – 1	Sporting CP	Coimbra
	Eder 28'	Report	Elias 80'	Stadium: Estádio Cidade de Coimbra; Attendance: 10,454; Referee: Rui Costa

8 January 2012 14	Sporting CP	0 – 0	Porto	Lisbon
				Stadium: Estádio José Alvalade; Attendance: 48,855; Referee: Pedro Proença

15 January 2012 15	Braga	2 – 1	Sporting CP	Braga
	Barbosa 51'; Lima 64'	Report	Carrillo 74'	Stadium: Estádio Municipal de Braga; Attendance: 16,802; Referee: João Capela

23 January 2012 16	Olhanense	0 – 0	Sporting CP	Olhão, Portugal
		Report		Stadium: Estádio José Arcanjo; Attendance: 4.066; Referee: Vasco Santos

29 January 2012 17	Sporting CP	2 – 0	Beira-Mar	Lisbon, Portugal
	Onyewu 18', 27'	Report		Stadium: Estádio José Alvalade; Attendance: 38.405; Referee: Duarte Gomes

11 February 2012 18	Marítimo	2 – 0	Sporting CP	Madeira, Portugal
	Benachour 21'; Dias 50'	Report		Stadium: Estádio dos Barreiros; Attendance: 4.600; Referee: Cosme Machado

19 February 2012 19	Sporting CP	1 – 0	Paços de Ferreira	Lisbon, Portugal
	Ricardo 36' (o.g.)	Report		Stadium: Estádio José Alvalade; Attendance: 28,418; Referee: Jorge Ferreira

26 February 2012 20	Sporting CP	1 – 0	Rio Ave	Lisbon, Portugal
	Izmailov 34'	Report		Stadium: Estádio José Alvalade; Attendance: 25.107; Referee: Paulo Baptista

3 March 2012 21	Vitória de Setúbal	1 – 0	Sporting CP	Setúbal, Portugal
	Amaro 19'	Report		Stadium: Estádio do Bonfim; Attendance: 4.000; Referee: André Gralha

11 March 2012 22	Sporting CP	5 – 0	Vitória de Guimarães	Lisbon, Portugal
	Van Wolfswinkel 21'; Fernández 50'; Izmailov 70' (pen.); Jeffrén 80', 87'	Report		Stadium: Estádio José Alvalade; Attendance: 33.349; Referee: Artur Soares Dias

19 March 2012 23	Gil Vicente	2 – 0	Sporting CP	Barcelos, Portugal
	Galo 13'; Cláudio 56'	Report		Stadium: Estádio Cidade de Barcelos; Attendance: 6.480; Referee: Bruno Paixão

24 March 2012 24	Sporting CP	1 – 0	Feirense	Lisbon, Portugal
	Capel 15' (pen.)	Summary		Stadium: Estádio José Alvalade; Attendance: 29,509; Referee: Vasco Santos

1 April 2012 25	União de Leiria	0 – 1	Sporting CP	Leiria, Portugal
		Report	Fernández 90+1'	Stadium: Estádio Municipal da Marinha Grande; Attendance: 4.930; Referee: Pedro Proença

9 April 2012 26	Sporting CP	1–0	Benfica	Lisbon
	Van Wolfswinkel 18' (pen.)			Stadium: Estádio José Alvalade; Attendance: 47,230; Referee: Artur Soares Dias

22 April 2012 27	Nacional	2 – 3	Sporting CP	Madeira
	Mateus 34'; Keita 75'	Report	Rubio 12'; Neto 31'; Van Wolfswinkel 77' (pen.)	Stadium: Estádio da Madeira; Attendance: 4,000; Referee: Carlos Xistra

30 April 2012 28	Sporting CP	2 – 1	Académica	Lisbon
	Carrillo 30'; Capel (yellow card) 36'; Van Wolfswinkel 77'; Schaars (yellow card) 79'; Carriço (yellow card) 85'	Summary	Simão (yellow card) 9'; Polga 44' (o.g.); Edinho (yellow card) 72'; Nivaldo (yellow card) 81'; Rui Miguel (yellow card) 84'	Stadium: Estádio José Alvalade; Referee: Hugo Filipe Ferreira de Campos Moreira Miguel

5 May 2012 29	Porto	2 – 0	Sporting CP	Porto
	Săpunaru (yellow card) 14'; Moutinho (yellow card) 41'; Fernando (yellow card) 43' (yellow-red card) 90+2'; González (yellow card) 49'; Hulk 82' (pen.), 89', (yellow card) 83'	Summary	Carrillo (yellow card) 16'; Onyewu (yellow card) 20' (yellow-red card) 67'; Polga (red card) 81'	Stadium: Estádio do Dragão; Attendance: 50,212; Referee: Pedro Proença

12 May 2012 30	Sporting CP	3 – 2	Braga	Lisbon
	Van Wolfswinkel 34', 61', 84'; Elias (yellow card) 62'; Evaldo (yellow card) 87'; Carriço (yellow card) 89'; Patrício (yellow card) 90'	Summary	Echiéjilé (yellow card) 53'; Barbosa 57'; Mossoró (yellow card) 62'; Lima 88' (pen.)	Stadium: Estádio José Alvalade; Attendance: 37,820; Referee: Marco Bruno dos Santos Ferreira

Source: Sporting.pt, Journal Record

=== Taça da Liga ===
==== Third round ====
Group A
Team	Pld	W	D	L	GF	GA	GD	Pts
Gil Vicente	3	2	1	0	4	2	+2	7
Moreirense	3	1	1	1	3	3	0	4
Sporting CP	3	0	2	1	2	3	−1	2
Rio Ave	3	0	2	1	2	3	−1	2

2 January 2012 1	Rio Ave	1 – 1	Sporting CP	Vila do Conde
	Tomás 16'		Onyewu 87'	Stadium: Estádio do Rio Ave FC; Attendance: 3,188; Referee: Cosme Machado

19 January 2012 2	Sporting CP	1 – 1	Moreirense	Lisbon
	Capel 28'	report	Ghilas 35'	Stadium: Estádio José Alvalade; Attendance: 17,440; Referee: Marco Ferreira

4 February 2012 3	Sporting CP	0 – 1	Gil Vicente	Lisbon
		report	Cláudio 54'	Stadium: Estádio José Alvalade; Attendance: 23,801; Referee: Bruno Esteves

Source: Sporting.pt,

=== UEFA Europa League ===
==== Play-off round ====
18 August 2011 First leg	Nordsjælland (Denmark)	0 – 0	(Portugal) Sporting CP	Farum, Denmark
		Report		Stadium: Farum Park; Attendance: 3,891; Referee: Mark Courtney (Northern Ireland)

25 August 2011 Second leg	Sporting CP (Portugal)	2 – 1 (2 – 1 agg.)	(Denmark) Nordsjælland	Lisbon, Portugal
	Santos 77'; Evaldo 82'	Report	Laudrup 90+3'	Stadium: Estádio José Alvalade; Attendance: 24,048; Referee: Ovidiu Haţegan (Romania)

==== Group stage ====
Group D
Team	Pld	W	D	L	GF	GA	GD	Pts
(Portugal) Sporting CP	6	4	0	2	8	4	+4	12
(Italy) Lazio	6	2	3	1	7	5	+2	9
(Romania) Vaslui	6	1	3	2	5	8	-3	6
(Switzerland) Zürich	6	1	2	3	5	8	-3	5

15 September 2011 1	Zürich (Switzerland)	0 – 2	(Portugal) Sporting CP	Zürich, Switzerland
		Report	Insúa 4'; Van Wolfswinkel 21'	Stadium: Letzigrund; Attendance: 10,400; Referee: Pol van Boekel (Netherlands)

29 September 2011 2	Sporting CP (Portugal)	2 – 1	(Italy) Lazio	Lisbon, Portugal
	Van Wolfswinkel 21'; Insúa 45+2'	Report	Klose 45+2'	Stadium: Estádio José Alvalade; Attendance: 33,725; Referee: Serge Gumienny (Belgium)

20 October 2011 3	Sporting CP (Portugal)	2 – 0	(Romania) Vaslui	Lisbon, Portugal
	Evaldo 43'; Fernández 70'	Report		Stadium: Estádio José Alvalade; Attendance: 28,106; Referee: Clément Turpin (France)

3 November 2011 4	Vaslui (Romania)	1 – 0	(Portugal) Sporting CP	Piatra Neamț, Romania
	Zmeu 30'	Report		Stadium: Ceahlăul; Attendance: 4,000; Referee: Kristinn Jakobsson (Iceland)

1 December 2011 5	Sporting CP (Portugal)	2 – 0	(Switzerland) Zürich	Lisbon, Portugal
	Van Wolfswinkel 15'; Bojinov 58'	Report		Stadium: Estádio José Alvalade; Attendance: 13,414; Referee: Peter Rasmussen (Denmark)

14 December 2011 6	Lazio (Italy)	2 – 0	(Portugal) Sporting CP	Rome, Italy
	Kozák 42'; Sculli 55'	Report		Stadium: Stadio Olimpico; Attendance: 8,295; Referee: Mike Dean (England)

==== Knockout phase ====
===== Round of 32 =====
16 February 2012 First leg	Legia Warsaw (Poland)	2 – 2	(Portugal) Sporting CP	Warsaw, Poland
	Wawrzyniak 37'; Gol 79'	Report	Carriço 60'; Santos 88'	Stadium: Polish Army Stadium; Attendance: 27,324; Referee: Matej Jug (Slovenia)

23 February 2012 Second leg	Sporting CP (Portugal)	1 – 0 (3 – 2 agg.)	(Poland) Legia Warsaw	Lisbon, Portugal
	Fernández 84'	Report		Stadium: Estádio José Alvalade; Attendance: 20,144; Referee: Vladislav Bezborodov (Russia)

===== Round of 16 =====
8 March 2012 First leg	Sporting CP (Portugal)	1 – 0	(England) Manchester City	Lisbon, Portugal
19:00	Xandão 51'	Report		Stadium: Estádio José Alvalade; Attendance: 34,371; Referee: Carlos Velasco Carballo (Spain)

15 March 2012 Second leg	Manchester City (England)	3 – 2 (3 – 3a agg.)	(Portugal) Sporting CP	Manchester, England
21:05	Agüero 60', 83'; Balotelli 75' (pen.)	Report	Fernández 33'; Van Wolfswinkel 40'	Stadium: Etihad Stadium; Attendance: 38,021; Referee: Tom Harald Hagen (Norway)

===== Quarter-finals =====
29 March 2012 First leg	Sporting CP (Portugal)	2 – 1	(Ukraine) Metalist Kharkiv	Lisbon, Portugal
21:05	Izmailov 51'; Insúa 64'	Report	Xavier 90+1' (pen.)	Stadium: Estádio José Alvalade; Attendance: 40,512; Referee: Wolfgang Stark (Germany)

5 April 2012 Second leg	Metalist Kharkiv (Ukraine)	1 – 1 (2 – 3 agg.)	(Portugal) Sporting CP	Kharkiv, Ukraine
21:05	Cristaldo 57'	Report	Van Wolfswinkel 44'	Stadium: Metalist Stadium; Attendance: 38,633; Referee: William Collum (Scotland)

===== Semi-finals =====
19 April 2012 First leg	Sporting CP (Portugal)	2 – 1	(Spain) Athletic Bilbao	Lisbon, Portugal
21:05	Insúa 76'; Capel 80'	Report	Aurtenetxe 54'	Stadium: Estádio José Alvalade; Attendance: 37,238; Referee: Jonas Eriksson (Sweden)

26 April 2012 Second leg	Athletic Bilbao (Spain)	3 – 1 (4 – 3 agg.)	(Portugal) Sporting CP	Bilbao, Spain
21:05	Susaeta 17'; Gómez 45+1', (yellow card) 76'; Amorebieta (yellow card) 54'; Llorente 88'	Report	Van Wolfswinkel (yellow card) 10', (goal) 44'; Carriço (yellow card) 59'; Xandão (yellow card) 90+4'	Stadium: San Mamés Stadium; Attendance: 37,598; Referee: Martin Atkinson (England)

=== Taça de Portugal ===
==== Round of 64 ====
16 October 2011	Famalicão (Portugal)	0 – 2	(Portugal) Sporting CP	Vila Nova de Famalicão, Portugal
			Van Wolfswinkel 62', 67'	Stadium: Municipal 22 de Junho; Referee: Artur Soares Dias

==== Round of 32 ====
18 November 2011	Sporting CP (Portugal)	2 – 0	(Portugal) S.C. Braga	Lisbon
	Capel 14'; Insúa 21'			Stadium: Estádio José Alvalade; Referee: Jorge Sousa

==== Round of 16 ====
5 December 2011 1st Leg	Sporting CP (Portugal)	2 – 0	(Portugal) Belenenses	Lisbon
	Van Wolfswinkel 50'; Schaars 66'			Stadium: Estádio José Alvalade; Referee: Bruno Esteves

==== Quarter-finals ====
22 December 2011	Sporting CP (Portugal)	3 – 0	(Portugal) Marítimo	Lisbon
	Carrillo 48'; Van Wolfswinkel 60' (pen.); Insúa 82'	Report		Stadium: Estádio José Alvalade; Referee: Artur Soares Dias

==== Semi-finals ====
Team 1	Agg.	Team 2	1st leg	2nd leg
Sporting CP (Portugal)	5 – 3	(Portugal) Nacional	2 - 2	3 - 1

11 January 2012 1st Leg	Sporting CP	2 – 2	Nacional	Lisbon
	Elias 75'; Schaars 90+6'	Report	Rondón 36'; Candeias 45+1'	Stadium: Estádio José Alvalade; Referee: Paulo Baptista

8 February 2012 2nd Leg	Nacional	1 – 3	Sporting CP	Funchal, Madeira
	Barcelos 63'	Report	Rinaudo 18'; Van Wolfswinkel 75'; Pereira 90+4'	Stadium: Estádio da Madeira; Referee: Pedro Proença

==== Final ====
20 May 2012 Final	Sporting CP	0 – 1	Académica	Oeiras
17:00 UTC+1			Marinho 4'	Stadium: Estádio Nacional; Attendance: 37,522; Referee: Paulo Baptista

=== Overview ===
Competition	Started round	Current position / round	Final position / round	First match	Last match
Primeira Liga	—	—		13 August 2011	13 May 2012
Millennium Cup	QR3	Final		15 October 2011	20 May 2012
Portuguese League Cup	Third qualifying round	—	QR3	2 January 2012	4 February 2012
UEFA Europa League	Play-off round	—	SF	18 August 2011	26 April 2012

Updated to match played 10 July 2011
Source: Competitions
