= 2014–15 FC Mordovia Saransk season =

Mordovia Saransk
2014–15 season
- Chairman: Nikolay Levin
- Manager: Yuri Semin
- Stadium: Start Stadium
- Russian Premier League: 8th
- Russian Cup: Quarterfinal vs Kuban Krasnodar
- Top goalscorer: League: Two Players (3); All: Ruslan Mukhametshin (5)
- Highest home attendance: 11,613 vs CSKA Moscow; 9 August 2014
- Lowest home attendance: 1,967 vs Krasnodar; 2 November 2014
- Average home league attendance: 5,211; 31 May 2015
Home colours	Away colours

The 2014–15 FC Mordovia Saransk season was Mordovia Saransk's 1st season back in the Russian Premier League, the highest tier of association football in Russia, following their promotion in 2014, and their 2nd season in total. Mordovia Saransk will also be taking part in the Russian Cup.

== Squad ==
Note: Flags indicate national team as defined under FIFA eligibility rules; some limited exceptions apply. Players may hold more than one non-FIFA nationality.

No.	Pos.	Nation	Player
1	GK	RUS	Anton Kochenkov
3	DF	RUS	Yevgeni Gapon
4	DF	BLR	Igor Shitov
5	DF	RUS	Viktor Vasin (on loan from CSKA Moscow)
6	MF	NED	Mitchell Donald
7	FW	FRA	Damien Le Tallec
8	MF	RUS	Anton Bobyor
9	MF	RUS	Rustem Mukhametshin
10	MF	BEL	Danilo
11	MF	RUS	Dmitri Sysuev
12	DF	MNE	Vladimir Božović
14	FW	RUS	Pavel Yakovlev (on loan from Spartak Moscow)
16	FW	POR	Yannick Djaló (on loan from Benfica)
17	DF	RUS	Aslan Dudiyev
18	MF	SEN	Ibrahima Niasse
22	FW	RUS	Sergey Samodin
23	FW	RUS	Ruslan Mukhametshin (loan from Rubin Kazan)

No.	Pos.	Nation	Player
25	GK	MDA	Ilie Cebanu
32	DF	SRB	Marko Lomić
33	GK	RUS	Denis Shebanov
40	DF	SRB	Milan Perendija
48	FW	RUS	Yevgeni Lutsenko
55	DF	RUS	Ruslan Nakhushev
69	MF	RUS	Vladislav Nurgaleyev
71	GK	RUS	Ilya Kamalikhin
72	DF	RUS	Eduard Mansurov
74	FW	RUS	Aleksandr Cherentayev
75	FW	RUS	Denis Abramov
76	FW	RUS	Ilya Yermoshkin
77	DF	RUS	Sergei Uchelkin
84	MF	RUS	Oleg Vlasov
88	MF	RUS	Aleksei Ivanov
91	MF	NED	Lorenzo Ebecilio (on loan from Metalurh Donetsk)
99	FW	RUS	Pavel Ignatovich

=== Out on loan ===
Note: Flags indicate national team as defined under FIFA eligibility rules; some limited exceptions apply. Players may hold more than one non-FIFA nationality.

No.	Pos.	Nation	Player
13	FW	RUS	Mikhail Markin (at Khimki)

== Transfers ==
=== Summer ===
In: Note: Flags indicate national team as defined under FIFA eligibility rules; some limited exceptions apply. Players may hold more than one non-FIFA nationality.

No.	Pos.	Nation	Player
5	DF	RUS	Viktor Vasin (loan from (Russia) CSKA Moscow)
6	MF	NED	Mitchell Donald (from (Netherlands) Roda JC Kerkrade)
7	FW	FRA	Damien Le Tallec (from (Ukraine) Hoverla Uzhhorod)
10	MF	BEL	Danilo (from (Ukraine) Metalurh Donetsk)
11	FW	RUS	Dmitri Sysuyev (from (Russia) Baltika Kaliningrad)
17	DF	RUS	Aslan Dudiyev (from (Russia) SKA-Energiya Khabarovsk)
18	MF	SEN	Ibrahima Niasse (from (Azerbaijan) Gabala)
23	FW	RUS	Ruslan Mukhametshin (loan from (Russia) Rubin Kazan')
25	GK	MDA	Ilie Cebanu (from (Russia) Tom Tomsk)
32	DF	SRB	Marko Lomić (from (Russia) Dynamo Moscow)
84	MF	RUS	Oleg Vlasov (from (Russia) Torpedo Moscow)
91	MF	NED	Lorenzo Ebecilio (loan from (Ukraine) Metalurh Donetsk, previously on loan at (Azerbaijan) Gabala)
99	FW	RUS	Pavel Ignatovich (from (Russia) Dynamo Moscow)

Out: Note: Flags indicate national team as defined under FIFA eligibility rules; some limited exceptions apply. Players may hold more than one non-FIFA nationality.

No.	Pos.	Nation	Player
2	DF	RUS	Maksim Budnikov
5	DF	RUS	Ismail Ediyev (to (Russia) SKA-Energiya Khabarovsk)
7	MF	RUS	Sergei Vaganov (to (Russia) Luch-Energiya Vladivostok)
11	MF	RUS	Maksim Rogov
15	MF	RUS	Aleksandr Dimidko (to (Russia) Tom Tomsk)
18	MF	RUS	Vadim Gagloyev
20	FW	RUS	Sergey Samodin (loan to (Russia) Shinnik Yaroslavl)
24	MF	RUS	Andrei Pazin
34	MF	RUS	Igor Krutov
35	MF	GEO	Akaki Khubutia
73	MF	RUS	Maksim Terentyev

=== Winter ===
In: Note: Flags indicate national team as defined under FIFA eligibility rules; some limited exceptions apply. Players may hold more than one non-FIFA nationality.

No.	Pos.	Nation	Player
3	DF	RUS	Yevgeni Gapon (from (Russia) Shinnik Yaroslavl)
14	FW	RUS	Pavel Yakovlev (on loan from (Russia) Spartak Moscow)
16	FW	POR	Yannick Djaló (loan from (Portugal) Benfica)
22	FW	RUS	Sergey Samodin (end of loan to (Russia) Shinnik Yaroslavl)
69	MF	RUS	Vladislav Nurgaleyev
71	GK	RUS	Ilya Kamalikhin (from (Russia) MGPI-Mordovia Saransk)
72	DF	RUS	Eduard Mansurov (from (Russia) Mordovia-2 Saransk)
74	FW	RUS	Aleksandr Cherentayev (from (Russia) Mordovia-2 Saransk)
75	FW	RUS	Denis Abramov
76	FW	RUS	Ilya Yermoshkin (from (Russia) Saransk-Mordovia Saransk)
77	DF	RUS	Sergei Uchelkin (from (Russia) Mordovia-2 Saransk)

Out: Note: Flags indicate national team as defined under FIFA eligibility rules; some limited exceptions apply. Players may hold more than one non-FIFA nationality.

No.	Pos.	Nation	Player
13	FW	RUS	Mikhail Markin (on loan to (Russia) Khimki)
24	MF	MDA	Alexandru Suvorov (to (Moldova) Milsami Orhei)

== Competitions ==
=== Russian Premier League ===
==== Results by round ====
Round	1	2	3	4	5	6	7	8	9	10	11	12	13	14	15	16	17	18	19	20	21	22	23	24	25	26	27	28	29	30
Ground	A	H	H	A	A	H	A	A	H	A	A	H	A	A	H	H	H	A	A	H	A	H	A	H	H	A	H	H	H	A
Result	W	L	D	L	L	W	D	W	L	L	L	W	W	L	W	L	L	D	L	D	L	W	L	L	W	W	W	D	W	L
Position	7	8	9	9	10	9	10	8	10	11	11	10	10	10	10	10	10	10	10	10	10	10	10	11	10	10	9	9	8	8

Updated to match(es) played on 31 May 2015. Source: Russian Premier League
A = Away; H = Home; W = Win; D = Draw; L = Loss

==== Matches ====
2 August 2014 1	Ural	2–3	Mordovia Saransk	Yekaterinburg
16:30 MSK (UTC+4)	Manucharyan 6' (pen.); Yaroshenko 86'	Summary	Donald 12'; Vlasov 45+2'; Lutsenko 73'	Stadium: Central Stadium; Attendance: 9,800; Referee: Kirill Levnikov

9 August 2014 2	Mordovia Saransk	0–1	CSKA Moscow	Saransk
13:30 MSK (UTC+4)		Summary	Doumbia 79' (pen.)	Stadium: Start Stadium; Attendance: 11,613; Referee: Sergey Lapochkin

15 August 2014 3	Mordovia Saransk	0–0	Kuban Krasnodar	Saransk
20:00 MSK (UTC+4)		Summary	Danilo (red card) 69'	Stadium: Start Stadium; Attendance: 7,486; Referee: Alexey Nikolaev

18 August 2014 4	Terek Grozny	1–0	Mordovia Saransk	Grozny
20:00 MSK (UTC+4)	Utsiyev 69'	Summary		Stadium: Akhmat-Arena; Attendance: 17,235; Referee: Sergei Karasev

24 August 2014 5	Rostov	2–1	Mordovia Saransk	Rostov-on-Don
21:30 MSK (UTC+4)	Grigoryev 80'; Kanga 81'	Summary	Donald 61'	Stadium: Olimp-2; Attendance: 8,500; Referee: Vitali Meshkov

30 August 2014 6	Mordovia Saransk	1–0	Torpedo Moscow	Saransk
14:00 MSK (UTC+4)	Lutsenko 21'; Shitov (yellow card) 40' (yellow-red card) 59'	Summary		Stadium: Start Stadium; Attendance: 3,970; Referee: Vladimir Moskalyov

13 September 2014 7	Lokomotiv Moscow	1–1	Mordovia Saransk	Moscow
16:00 MSK (UTC+4)	O.Niasse 68'	Summary	Vasin 14'	Stadium: Lokomotiv Stadium; Attendance: 12,000; Referee: Igor Nizovtsev

19 September 2014 8	Arsenal Tula	0–1	Mordovia Saransk	Tula
20:00 MSK (UTC+4)		Summary	Rln.Mukhametshin 70'	Stadium: Arsenal Stadium; Attendance: 10,100; Referee: Kirill Levnikov

27 September 2014 9	Mordovia Saransk	0–2	Ufa	Saransk
16:00 MSK (UTC+4)		Summary	Semakin 64'; Handžić 84' (pen.)	Stadium: Start Stadium; Attendance: 3,762; Referee: Mikhail Vilkov

20 October 2014 10	Rubin Kazan'	5–0	Mordovia Saransk	Kazan
19:30 MSK (UTC+4)	Portnyagin 12'; Kanunnikov 70'; Karadeniz 79', 85' (pen.); Carlos Eduardo 81'	Summary		Stadium: Kazan Arena; Attendance: 9,132; Referee: Igor Fedotov

26 October 2014 11	Zenit St.Petersburg	5–0	Mordovia Saransk	Saint Petersburg
19:00 MSK (UTC+3)	Hulk 50'; Kerzhakov 55'; Nakhushev 62' (o.g.); Witsel 67'; Danny 70'; Anyukov (yellow card) 85'	Summary	Le Tallec (yellow card) 47'; Vasin (yellow card) 79'; Shitov (yellow card) 81'; Lutsenko (yellow card) 82'	Stadium: Petrovsky Stadium; Attendance: 17,300; Referee: Aleksei Nikolaev

2 November 2014 12	Mordovia Saransk	2–1	Krasnodar	Saransk
16:30 MSK (UTC+3)	Lomić 56' (pen.), 76'	Summary	Joãozinho 38'	Stadium: Start Stadium; Attendance: 1,967; Referee: Vitali Meshkov

8 November 2014 13	Amkar Perm'	0–1	Mordovia Saransk	Perm
13:00 MSK (UTC+3)		Summary	Vasin 54'	Stadium: Zvezda Stadium; Attendance: 4,000; Referee: Sergei Ivanov

23 November 2014 14	Spartak Moscow	4–2	Mordovia Saransk	Moscow
18:30 MSK (UTC+3)	Promes 9', 18'; João Carlos 27'; Parshivlyuk (yellow card) 44'; Dzyuba 90+3'	Summary	Lomić 45' (pen.); Rln.Mukhametshin 58'	Stadium: Otkrytie Arena; Attendance: 18,204; Referee: Vladislav Bezborodov

29 November 2014 15	Mordovia Saransk	1–0	Zenit St.Petersburg	Saransk
18:00 MSK (UTC+3)	Vlasov 29'; Dudiyev (yellow card) 45'	Summary	Smolnikov (yellow card) 28'; Fayzulin (yellow card) 65'; Hulk (yellow card) 70'	Stadium: Start Stadium; Attendance: 6,700; Referee: Aleksei Matyunin

4 December 2014 16	Mordovia Saransk	0–1	Dynamo Moscow	Saransk
17:45 MSK (UTC+3)	Nakhushev (yellow card) 49'; Perendija (yellow card) 56'; Lomić (yellow card) 82'	Summary	Hubočan 36'	Stadium: Start Stadium; Attendance: 3,967; Referee: Vitali Meshkov

8 December 2014 17	Mordovia Saransk	0–1	Rubin Kazan'	Saransk
17:00 MSK (UTC+3)	Shitov (yellow card) 3'; Danilo (yellow card) 18'; Nakhushev (yellow card) 22'; Perendija (yellow card) 82'	Summary	Carlos Eduardo 42'; Kuzmin (yellow card) 56'; Kvirkvelia (yellow card) 57'; Kambolov (yellow card) 88'	Stadium: Start Stadium; Attendance: 4,370; Referee: Aleskey Eskov

9 March 2015 18	Kuban Krasnodar	0–0	Mordovia Saransk	Krasnodar
18:00 MSK (UTC+3)	Almeida (yellow card) 47'; Popov (yellow card) 74'	Summary	Božović (yellow card) 30'; Shitov (yellow card) 57'; Samodin (yellow card) 82'	Stadium: Kuban Stadium; Attendance: 5,000; Referee: Aleksei Matyunin

14 March 2015 19	CSKA Moscow	4–0	Mordovia Saransk	Khimki
16:00 MSK (UTC+3)	Dzagoev 4'; Wernbloom (yellow card) 22'; Eremenko 33', 64'; Nababkin 79'	Summary	Yakovlev (red card) 20'; Shitov (yellow card) 36'	Stadium: Arena Khimki; Attendance: 9,000; Referee: Vitaly Rushakov

22 March 2015 20	Mordovia Saransk	0–0	Lokomotiv Moscow	Saransk
16:00 MSK (UTC+3)	Vasin (yellow card) 24'; Gapon (yellow card) 36'	Summary	Mykhalyk (yellow card) 14' (yellow-red card) 90'; Kasaev (yellow card) 20'; Škuletić (yellow card) 24'; Tarasov (yellow card) 30'; Ďurica (yellow card) 85'	Stadium: Start Stadium; Attendance: 7,787; Referee: Mikhail Vilkov

4 April 2015 21	Krasnodar	4–0	Mordovia Saransk	Krasnodar
16:45 MSK (UTC+3)	Mamayev 5', 70'; Izmailov (yellow card) 15'; Laborde 85'; Bystrov 90+1'	Summary	Božović (yellow card) 67'; Shitov (yellow card) 83'	Stadium: Kuban Stadium; Attendance: 5,100; Referee: Igor Fedotov

7 April 2015 22	Mordovia Saransk	1–0	Amkar Perm	Saransk
17:45 MSK (UTC+3)	Djaló 3' (pen.)	Summary	Ogude (yellow card) 2'; Cherenchikov (yellow card) 66'; Belorukov (yellow card) 76' (yellow-red card) 83'	Stadium: Start Stadium; Attendance: 4,335; Referee: Vladimir Moskalyov

12 April 2015 23	Dynamo Moscow	2–1	Mordovia Saransk	Khimki
18:30 MSK (UTC+3)	Douglas 42'; Kurányi 45+1'; Rotenberg (yellow card) 73'	Summary	Le Tallec (yellow card) 56'; Danilo 86'	Stadium: Arena Khimki; Attendance: 5,230; Referee: Kirill Levnikov

18 April 2015 24	Mordovia Saransk	1–3	Spartak Moscow	Saransk
16:00 MSK (UTC+3)	Gapon (yellow card) 23'; Niasse 90+2'	Summary	Promes 46', 78' (yellow card) 70'; Davydov (yellow card) 60'; Movsisyan (yellow card) 86' (goal) 90+3'	Stadium: Start Stadium; Attendance: 7,920; Referee: Sergei Ivanov

24 April 2015 25	Mordovia Saransk	2–1	Ural	Saransk
19:00 MSK (UTC+3)	Dudiyev 50'; Shitov (yellow card) 59'; Rln.Mukhametshin 80' (yellow card) 81'	Summary	Khozin (yellow card) 18'; Yerokhin 45'; Yemelyanov (yellow card) 52'; Belozyorov (yellow card) 58'; Markov (yellow card) 75'	Stadium: Start Stadium; Attendance: 4,388; Referee: Sergey Kostevich

4 May 2015 26	Ufa	1–2	Mordovia Saransk	Perm
13:00 MSK (UTC+3)	Marcinho 18'	Summary	Perendija 22' (yellow card) 90+4'; Ebecilio (yellow card) 35' (goal) 62'; Shitov (yellow card) 83'; Lutsenko (yellow card) 85'; Kochenkov (yellow card) 90'	Stadium: Zvezda Stadium; Attendance: 200; Referee: Vladislav Bezborodov

11 May 2015 27	Mordovia Saransk	1–0	Arsenal Tula	Saransk
16:00 MSK (UTC+3)	Le Tallec 45+2'; Niasse (yellow card) 69'	Summary	Sukharev (yellow card) 22'; Osipov (yellow card) 47'; Khagush (yellow card) 64'; Lyakh (yellow card) 78'; Kutyin (yellow card) 83'; Smirnov (yellow card) 87'	Stadium: Start Stadium; Attendance: 4,272; Referee: Aleksei Matyunin

15 May 2015 28	Mordovia Saransk	0–0	Rostov	Saransk
19:00 MSK (UTC+3)	Shitov (yellow card) 19'; Vlasov (yellow card) 35'; Le Tallec (yellow card) 81'; Yakovlev (yellow card) 90+4'	Summary	Gațcan (yellow card) 25'; Azmoun (yellow card) 90+2'	Stadium: Start Stadium; Attendance: 4,315; Referee: Sergey Karasev

24 May 2015 29	Mordovia Saransk	1–0	Terek Grozny	Saransk
16:00 MSK (UTC+3)	Ebecilio 61' (yellow card) 70'	Summary	Kudryashov (yellow card) 29' (yellow-red card) 56'	Stadium: Start Stadium; Attendance: 4,424; Referee: Aleksey Eskov

30 May 2015 30	Torpedo Moscow	2–0	Mordovia Saransk	Ramensky District
13:30 MSK (UTC+3)	Rykov 17'; Pugin 90'	Summary	Nakhushev (yellow card) 18'; Ebecilio (yellow card) 61'; Samodin (yellow card) 67'	Stadium: Saturn Stadium; Attendance: 5,300; Referee: Mikhail Vilkov

==== League table ====
Pos	Team	Pld	W	D	L	GF	GA	GD	Pts	Qualification or relegation
6	Spartak Moscow	30	12	8	10	42	42	0	44	
7	Lokomotiv Moscow	30	11	10	9	31	25	+6	43	Qualification for the Europa League group stage (Note: Lokomotiv Moscow qualified for Europa League group stage by winning the 2014–15 Russian Cup.)
8	Mordovia Saransk	30	11	5	14	22	43	−21	38	
9	Terek Grozny	30	10	7	13	30	30	0	37	
10	Kuban Krasnodar	30	8	12	10	32	36	−4	36	

Source: Russian Premier League
Rules for classification: 1) points; 2) number of matches won; 3) head-to-head points; 4) head-to-head wins; 5) head-to-head goal difference; 6) head-to-head goals; 7) number of head-to-head away goals; 8) goal difference; 9) number of goals scored; 10) number of away goals scored

=== Russian Cup ===
24 September 2014 Round of 32	Ryazan	1–2	Mordovia Saransk	Ryazan
19:00 MSK (UTC+4)	Zhdankin 6'	Summary	Rln.Mukhametshin 42'; Vasin 90+2'	Stadium: CSK Stadium; Attendance: 6,000; Referee: Yury Aponasenko

30 October 2014 Round of 16	Mordovia Saransk	5–1	Shinnik Yaroslavl	Saransk
17:00 MSK (UTC+3)	Sysuyev 52'; Lutsenko 54', 65'; Vasin 67'; Rln.Mukhametshin 73'	Summary	Malyarov (red card) 37'; Rylov 86'	Stadium: Start Stadium; Attendance: 2,100; Referee: Aleksei Matyunin

2 March 2015 Quarterfinal	Kuban Krasnodar	1–0	Mordovia Saransk	Krasnodar
20:00 MSK (UTC+3)	Šunjić 34'; Kulik (yellow card) 78'; Popov (yellow card) 90+3'	Summary	Lutsenko (yellow card) 14'; Shitov (yellow card) 48'; Božović (yellow card) 88'	Stadium: Kuban Stadium; Attendance: 6,200; Referee: Mikhail Vilkov

== Squad statistics ==
As of match played 30 May 2015

=== Appearances and goals ===
No.	Pos	Nat	Player	Total		Premier League		Russian Cup	
No.	Pos	Nat	Player	Apps	Goals	Apps	Goals	Apps	Goals
1	GK	(Russia) RUS	Anton Kochenkov	33	0	30	0	3	0
3	DF	(Russia) RUS	Yevgeni Gapon	9	0	8+1	0	0	0
4	DF	(Belarus) BLR	Igor Shitov	25	0	21+1	0	3	0
5	DF	(Russia) RUS	Viktor Vasin	33	4	30	2	3	2
6	MF	(Netherlands) NED	Mitchell Donald	12	2	11+1	2	0	0
7	FW	(France) FRA	Damien Le Tallec	31	1	29	1	2	0
8	MF	(Russia) RUS	Anton Bobyor	12	0	0+11	0	1	0
9	MF	(Russia) RUS	Rustem Mukhametshin	5	0	0+3	0	1+1	0
10	FW	(Belgium) BEL	Danilo	17	1	6+10	1	1	0
11	MF	(Russia) RUS	Dmitri Sysuev	11	1	8+1	0	1+1	1
12	DF	(Montenegro) MNE	Vladimir Božović	16	0	11+2	0	3	0
14	FW	(Russia) RUS	Pavel Yakovlev	12	0	10+1	0	1	0
16	FW	(Portugal) POR	Yannick Djaló	10	1	8+1	1	1	0
17	DF	(Russia) RUS	Aslan Dudiyev	24	1	13+9	1	1+1	0
18	MF	(Senegal) SEN	Ibrahima Niasse	28	1	22+4	1	2	0
22	FW	(Russia) RUS	Sergey Samodin	8	0	3+4	0	1	0
23	FW	(Russia) RUS	Ruslan Mukhametshin	20	5	9+8	3	1+2	2
32	DF	(Serbia) SRB	Marko Lomić	19	3	17	3	2	0
40	DF	(Serbia) SRB	Milan Perendija	23	1	19+3	1	1	0
48	FW	(Russia) RUS	Yevgeni Lutsenko	25	4	16+6	2	2+1	2
55	DF	(Russia) RUS	Ruslan Nakhushev	25	0	20+4	0	0+1	0
84	MF	(Russia) RUS	Oleg Vlasov	31	2	29	2	1+1	0
88	MF	(Russia) RUS	Aleksei Ivanov	5	0	2+2	0	1	0
91	MF	(Netherlands) NED	Lorenzo Ebecilio	10	2	7+3	2	0	0
99	FW	(Russia) RUS	Pavel Ignatovich	6	0	0+5	0	1	0
Players away from the club on loan:
13	FW	(Russia) RUS	Mikhail Markin	2	0	0+2	0	0	0
Players who appeared for Mordovia Saransk no longer at the club:

=== Goal scorers ===
Place	Position	Nation	Number	Name	Russian Premier League	Russian Cup	Total
1	FW	(Russia)	23	Ruslan Mukhametshin	3	2	5
2	DF	(Russia)	5	Viktor Vasin	2	2	4
2	FW	(Russia)	48	Yevgeni Lutsenko	2	2	4
4	DF	(Serbia)	32	Marko Lomić	3	0	3
5	MF	(Netherlands)	6	Mitchell Donald	2	0	2
5	MF	(Russia)	84	Oleg Vlasov	2	0	2
5	FW	(France)	7	Damien Le Tallec	2	0	2
8	FW	(Portugal)	16	Yannick Djaló	1	0	1
8	FW	(Brazil)	10	Danilo	1	0	1
8	MF	(Senegal)	18	Ibrahima Niasse	1	0	1
8	DF	(Russia)	17	Aslan Dudiyev	1	0	1
8	DF	(Serbia)	40	Milan Perendija	1	0	1
8	MF	(Netherlands)	91	Lorenzo Ebecilio	1	0	1
8	MF	(Russia)	11	Dmitri Sysuev	0	1	1
				TOTALS	22	7	29

=== Disciplinary record ===
Number	Nation	Position	Name	Russian Premier League		Russian Cup		Total	
Number	Nation	Position	Name	Yellow card	Red card	Yellow card	Red card	Yellow card	Red card
1	(Russia)	GK	Anton Kochenkov	3	0	0	0	3	0
3	(Russia)	DF	Yevgeni Gapon	2	0	0	0	2	0
4	(Belarus)	DF	Igor Shitov	14	1	1	0	15	1
5	(Russia)	DF	Viktor Vasin	3	0	0	0	3	0
6	(Netherlands)	MF	Mitchell Donald	1	0	0	0	1	0
7	(France)	FW	Damien Le Tallec	5	0	0	0	5	0
8	(Russia)	MF	Anton Bobyor	0	0	1	0	1	0
10	(Belgium)	FW	Danilo	3	0	0	0	3	0
12	(Montenegro)	DF	Vladimir Božović	3	0	1	0	4	0
14	(Russia)	FW	Pavel Yakovlev	1	1	0	0	1	1
17	(Russia)	DF	Aslan Dudiyev	1	0	0	0	1	0
18	(Senegal)	MF	Ibrahima Niasse	5	0	0	0	5	0
22	(Russia)	FW	Sergey Samodin	2	0	0	0	2	0
23	(Russia)	FW	Ruslan Mukhametshin	1	0	0	0	1	0
32	(Serbia)	DF	Marko Lomić	4	0	1	0	5	0
40	(Serbia)	DF	Milan Perendija	5	0	0	0	5	0
48	(Russia)	FW	Yevgeni Lutsenko	2	0	1	0	3	0
55	(Russia)	DF	Ruslan Nakhushev	7	0	1	0	8	0
84	(Russia)	MF	Oleg Vlasov	3	0	0	0	3	0
88	(Russia)	MF	Aleksei Ivanov	1	0	0	0	1	0
91	(Netherlands)	MF	Lorenzo Ebecilio	3	0	0	0	3	0
			TOTALS	69	2	6	0	75	2

== Notes ==
- MSK time changed from UTC+4 to UTC+3 permanently on 26 October 2014.
