= João Pereira (footballer, born 1984) =

Portuguese footballer

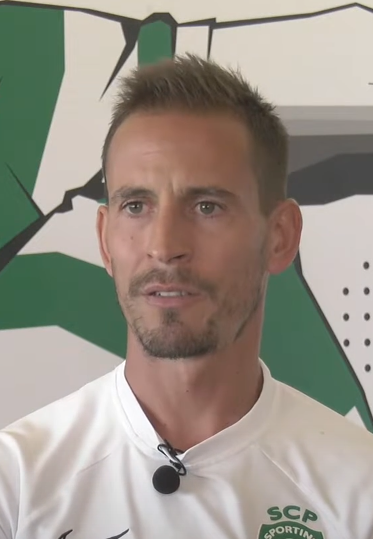
- Pereira as manager of Sporting CP B in 2022

Personal information
- Full name: João Pedro da Silva Esmail Pereira
- Birth name: João Pedro da Silva Pereira
- Date of birth: 25 February 1984 (age 42)
- Place of birth: Lisbon, Portugal
- Height: 1.72 m (5 ft 8 in)
- Position: Right-back

Youth career
- 1990–1994: Domingos Sávio
- 1994–2003: Benfica

Senior career*
Years	Team	Apps	(Gls)
2002–2005	Benfica B	7	(0)
2003–2006	Benfica	58	(4)
2006	→ Gil Vicente (loan)	14	(0)
2006–2007	Gil Vicente	25	(1)
2007–2009	Braga	67	(2)
2010–2012	Sporting CP	61	(3)
2012–2015	Valencia	55	(0)
2015	Hannover 96	5	(0)
2015–2016	Sporting CP	28	(0)
2017–2021	Trabzonspor	106	(3)
2021	Sporting CP	5	(0)
Total		431	(13)

International career
2000	Portugal U15	7	(1)
2000–2001	Portugal U16	7	(0)
2002	Portugal U18	5	(1)
2002–2003	Portugal U19	15	(1)
2004–2007	Portugal U21	28	(1)
2009	Portugal B	1	(0)
2010–2014	Portugal	40	(0)

Managerial career
- 2024: Sporting CP B
- 2024: Sporting CP
- 2025: Sporting CP B
- 2025–2026: Alanyaspor
Medal record
Men's football
Representing Portugal
UEFA European Championship
Bronze medal – third place	2012 Poland-Ukraine
UEFA European Under-21 Championship
Third place	2004 Germany
UEFA European Under-19 Championship
Runner-up	2003 Liechtenstein
- * Club domestic league appearances and goals

João Pedro da Silva Esmail Pereira (born 25 February 1984) is a Portuguese professional manager and former footballer who played as a right-back.

An attacking player, he was also known for his fiery temperament that led to altercations with adversaries and referees numerous times. In his country, he represented both Benfica and Sporting CP, winning the 2004–05 Primeira Liga with the former. He also spent two and a half seasons in Spain with Valencia and three and a half in Turkey with Trabzonspor, winning the 2019–20 Turkish Cup before returning to Sporting in February 2021, where he again won the domestic league, eventually amassing Primeira Liga totals of 233 matches and nine goals. Internationally, he represented Portugal at Euro 2012 and the 2014 World Cup.

After retiring in 2022, Pereira began his coaching career at Sporting's reserves, before taking charge of the first team in November 2024. He left his position one month later.

== Early life ==
Pereira was born in Lisbon, being raised in the troubled neighbourhood of Casal Ventoso. He later enrolled at the Casa Pia institution, where he achieved honour student status.

== Club career ==
=== Benfica ===
A product of local Benfica's youth system, Pereira first appeared with its first team on 17 August 2003 in a 0–0 away draw against Boavista, and finished his debut season with 25 Primeira Liga appearances, mostly as a midfielder.

Pereira was part of the Benfica squad that won the 2005 championship, starting often, until a fallout with coach Ronald Koeman relegated him to the bench and later to the B side. He was sold to Gil Vicente – also in the top flight – in the summer of 2006, after a previous loan to the same club.

=== Braga ===
In 2007–08, fully reconverted into a right-back, Pereira joined Braga, as another player in the position, Luís Filipe, went the other way.

An undisputed starter from the beginning, he scored his first goal for the Minho side on 22 February 2009, a 2–1 last-minute winner at Naval. He also collected a total of 17 yellow cards and two red in his first two seasons.

=== Sporting CP ===
On 22 December 2009, Pereira moved to Sporting CP for a fee of €3 million; at the time, Braga led the league alongside Benfica with 12 points in advance to his new club, with the Lions eventually finishing fourth.

Pereira again featured regularly for Sporting in the 2010–11 campaign, both as a defender and a midfielder, as his team ranked in third position. On 30 April 2011, he scored in a 2–1 home victory over Portimonense but was also sent off midway through the second half (after teammate André Santos) for repeatedly and severely insulting referee Duarte Gomes.

=== Valencia ===
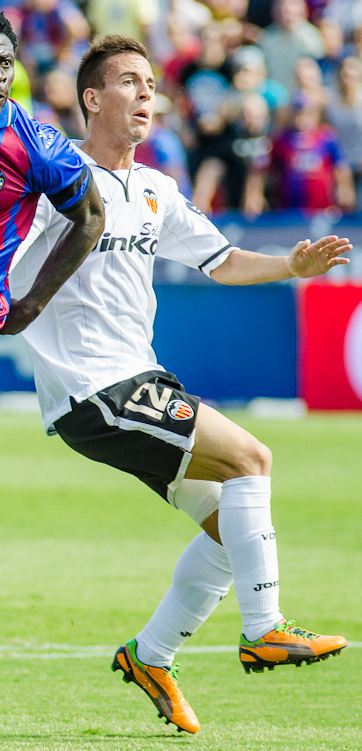
Pereira playing for Valencia in October 2012

On 24 May 2012, Pereira signed with Valencia in Spain for €3.6 million, penning a 3+1 contract. He made his official debut on 19 August, playing the full 90 minutes in a 1–1 away draw against Real Madrid.

Pereira was a starter in his first two years with the Che but, after the arrival of manager Nuno Espírito Santo for 2014–15, was relegated to third-choice right-back.

=== Hannover ===
In the January 2015 transfer window, Pereira signed for Bundesliga club Hannover 96 until the end of the season. He made his league debut on 7 February, playing the second half of a 2–1 away loss to Hamburger SV.

=== Return to Sporting ===
On 13 July 2015, Pereira returned to Sporting on a two-year deal with a €45 million buyout clause, as a replacement for Southampton-bound Cédric Soares. He made his debut on 9 August, featuring the full 90 minutes as they beat Benfica 1–0 to lift the Supertaça Cândido de Oliveira at the Estádio Algarve. Thirteen days later he received his third red card for the club – all direct – for conceding a penalty in a 1–1 home draw against Paços de Ferreira.

=== Trabzonspor ===
In December 2016, Pereira was coveted by Trabzonspor, who were told to pay at least €1.5 million for his signature. Early in the new year, he cancelled his contract that was due to expire in the summer and joined the Süper Lig club.

Pereira played four matches in the 2019–20 Turkish Cup, including the entire 2–0 final win over Alanyaspor. On 25 January 2021, he left the Şenol Güneş Stadium as a free agent.

=== Third Sporting stint ===
On 1 February 2021, shortly before his 37th birthday, Pereira returned to Sporting on a short-term deal. It was agreed that at its conclusion he would remain at the club as a coach.

== International career ==
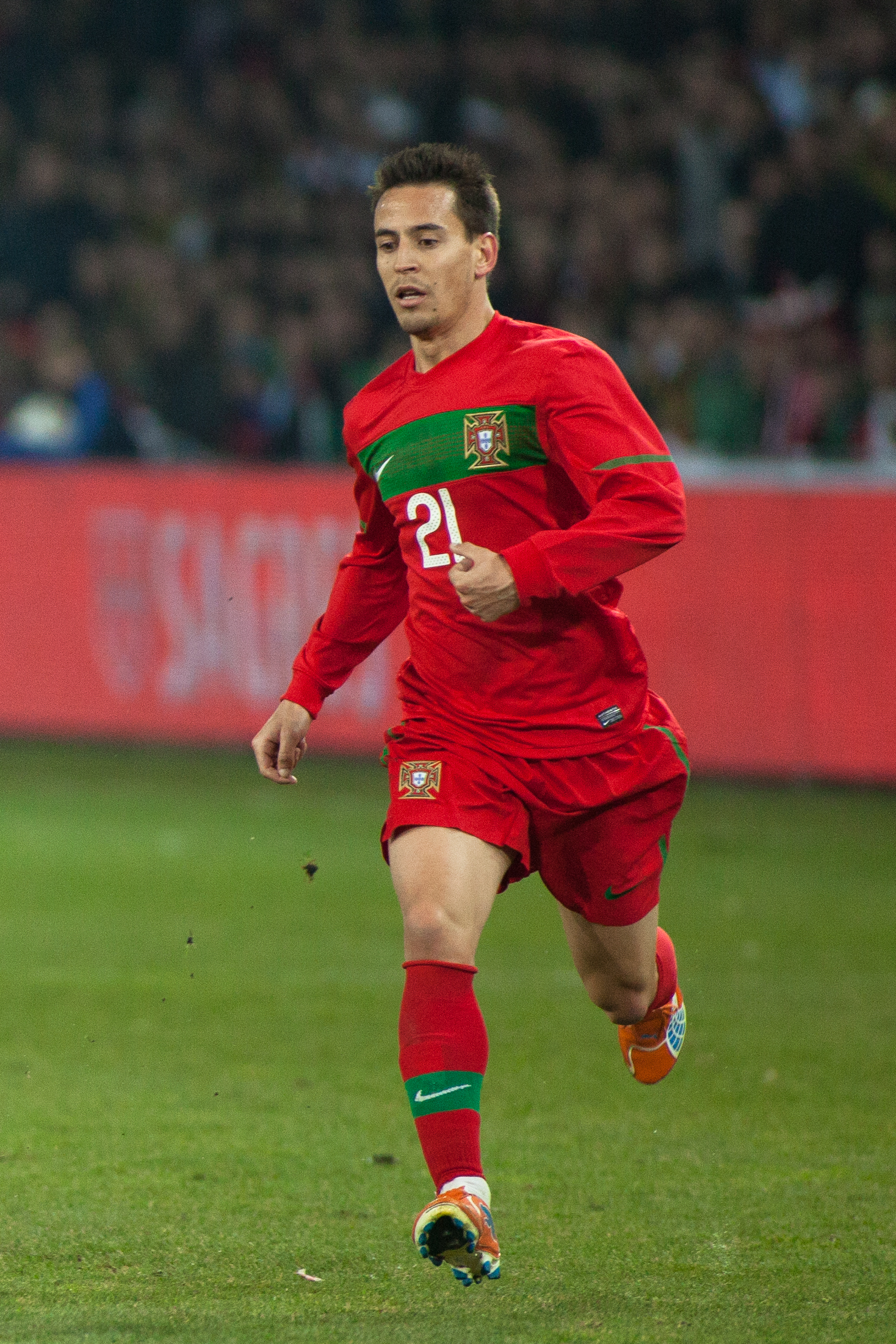
Pereira in action for Portugal in 2011

Pereira was first called to the Portugal senior team in October 2010, following the appointment of new coach Paulo Bento. He made his debut in a UEFA Euro 2012 qualifier against Denmark, and also started in the following match – in the same competition – in Iceland, with the national side winning both games 3–1.

On 19 May 2014, Pereira was named in the final 23-man squad for the 2014 FIFA World Cup. In the first game, against Germany, he committed a penalty on Mario Götze that resulted in the first goal scored by Thomas Müller, in an eventual 4–0 loss.

== Coaching career ==
Pereira started working as a manager on 8 July 2022, being appointed at Sporting's under-23s. Two years later, he switched to the senior reserve team in Liga 3.

On 11 November 2024, Pereira was officially presented as head coach of the main squad on a contract until June 2027, following Ruben Amorim's departure for Manchester United. In his first match in charge on 22 November, he led them to a 6–0 home win over Amarante in the fourth round of the Taça de Portugal; this was followed, however, by four consecutive losses, to Arsenal (5–1) and Club Brugge (2–1) in the league phase of the UEFA Champions League and Santa Clara (1–0) and Moreirense (2–1) in the main domestic tournament, becoming the first Sporting manager to lose four of the first five games.

Pereira was dismissed on 25 December 2024. Two weeks later, he was readmitted at Sporting B.

On 22 March 2025, Pereira returned to Turkey and its top division by signing a one-year deal with Alanyaspor. He was relieved of his duties in November 2026, with his side placed 13th.

== Personal life ==
In June 2018, Pereira married fashion entrepreneur Natacha Esmail. One of the two wedding ceremonies was held according to Hindu tradition, due to the bride's origins.

== Career statistics ==
=== Club ===
Appearances and goals by club, season and competition
Club	Season	League			Cup		League Cup		Continental		Other		Total	
Club	Season	Division	Apps	Goals	Apps	Goals	Apps	Goals	Apps	Goals	Apps	Goals	Apps	Goals
Benfica B	2001–02	Segunda Divisão	5	0	—		—		—		—		5	0
Benfica B	2005–06	Segunda Divisão	2	0	—		—		—		—		2	0
Benfica B	Total		7	0	—		—		—		—		7	0
Benfica	2003–04	Primeira Liga	25	4	3	1	—		6 (Note: Appearances in UEFA Cup / UEFA Europa League)	0	—		34	5
Benfica	2004–05	Primeira Liga	27	0	4	1	—		8 (Note: Seven appearances and one goal in UEFA Cup, one appearance in UEFA Champions League)	1	1 (Note: Appearance in Supertaça Cândido de Oliveira)	0	40	2
Benfica	2005–06	Primeira Liga	6	0	1	0	—		3 (Note: Appearances in UEFA Champions League)	0	1	0	11	0
Benfica	Total		58	4	8	2	—		17	1	2	0	85	7
Gil Vicente (loan)	2005–06	Primeira Liga	14	0	—		—		—		—		14	0
Gil Vicente	2006–07	Liga de Honra	25	1	0	0	—		—		—		25	1
Gil Vicente	Total		39	1	0	0	—		—		—		39	1
Braga	2007–08	Primeira Liga	27	0	2	0	1	0	8	0	—		38	0
Braga	2008–09	Primeira Liga	27	1	1	0	1	0	12 (Note: Ten appearances in UEFA Cup, two appearances in UEFA Intertoto Cup)	0	—		41	1
Braga	2009–10	Primeira Liga	13	1	2	0	0	0	1	0	—		16	1
Braga	Total		67	2	6	0	2	0	21	0	—		96	2
Sporting CP	2009–10	Primeira Liga	12	1	1	0	3	1	—		—		16	2
Sporting CP	2010–11	Primeira Liga	24	2	3	0	4	1	10	0	—		41	3
Sporting CP	2011–12	Primeira Liga	25	0	7	1	3	0	13	0	—		48	1
Sporting CP	Total		61	3	11	1	10	2	23	0	—		105	6
Valencia	2012–13	La Liga	30	0	2	0	—		5	0	—		37	0
Valencia	2013–14	La Liga	25	0	2	0	—		11	0	—		38	0
Valencia	2014–15	La Liga	0	0	0	0	—		—		—		0	0
Valencia	Total		55	0	4	0	—		16	0	—		75	0
Hannover 96	2014–15	Bundesliga	5	0	0	0	—		—		—		5	0
Sporting CP	2015–16	Primeira Liga	19	0	3	0	0	0	7 (Note: Five appearances in UEFA Europa League, two appearances in UEFA Champions League)	0	1	0	30	0
Sporting CP	2016–17	Primeira Liga	9	0	2	0	0	0	3	0	—		14	0
Sporting CP	Total		28	0	5	0	0	0	10	0	1	0	44	0
Trabzonspor	2016–17	Süper Lig	17	0	2	0	—		—		—		19	0
Trabzonspor	2017–18	Süper Lig	31	2	2	0	—		—		—		33	2
Trabzonspor	2018–19	Süper Lig	22	0	1	0	—		—		—		23	0
Trabzonspor	2019–20	Süper Lig	28	1	4	0	—		6	0	—		38	1
Trabzonspor	2020–21	Süper Lig	8	0	1	0	—		—		0	0	9	0
Trabzonspor	Total		106	3	10	0	0	0	6	0	0	0	122	3
Sporting CP	2020–21	Primeira Liga	5	0	—		—		—		—		5	0
Career total			431	13	44	3	12	2	93	1	3	0	583	19

=== International ===
Appearances and goals by national team and year
National team	Year	Apps	Goals
Portugal	2010	3	0
Portugal	2011	9	0
Portugal	2012	11	0
Portugal	2013	10	0
Portugal	2014	7	0
Total		40	0

== Managerial statistics ==
As of match played 8 November 2026

Managerial record by team and tenure
Team	Nat	From	To	Record							
Team	Nat	From	To	G	W	D	L	GF	GA	GD	Win %
Sporting CP B	(Portugal)	1 July 2024	11 November 2024	11	4	4	3	12	13	−1	36.36
Sporting CP	(Portugal)	11 November 2024	25 December 2024	8	3	1	4	14	13	+1	37.50
Sporting CP B	(Portugal)	9 January 2025	22 March 2025	9	3	5	1	10	7	+3	33.33
Alanyaspor	(Turkey)	22 March 2025	10 November 2026	60	17	22	21	78	77	+1	28.33
Total				88	27	32	29	114	110	+4	30.68

== Honours ==
=== Player ===
Benfica

- Primeira Liga: 2004–05
- Taça de Portugal: 2003–04
- Supertaça Cândido de Oliveira: 2005

Braga

- UEFA Intertoto Cup: 2008

Sporting CP

- Primeira Liga: 2020–21
- Supertaça Cândido de Oliveira: 2015

Trabzonspor

- Turkish Cup: 2019–20
