= Yannick Djaló =

Portuguese footballer (born 1986)

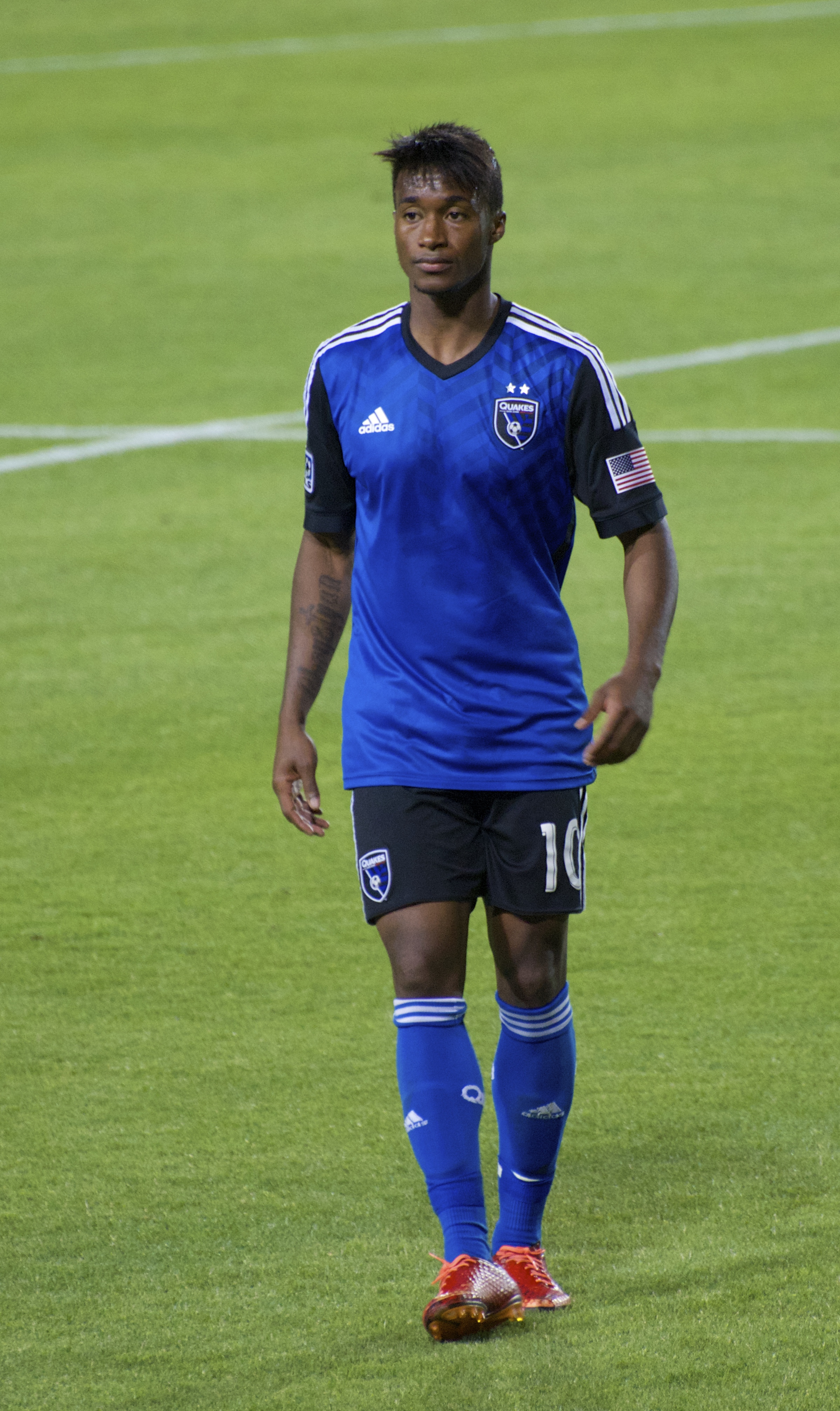
- Djaló playing for San Jose Earthquakes in 2014

Personal information
- Full name: Yannick dos Santos Djaló
- Date of birth: 5 May 1986 (age 40)
- Place of birth: Bissau, Guinea-Bissau
- Height: 1.71 m (5 ft 7 in)
- Positions: Forward; winger

Youth career
- 1998–1999: Forte da Casa
- 1999–2001: Estação
- 2001–2005: Sporting CP

Senior career*
Years	Team	Apps	(Gls)
2003	Sporting CP B	10	(1)
2005–2011	Sporting CP	98	(23)
2005–2006	→ Casa Pia (loan)	26	(16)
2012–2016	Benfica	3	(0)
2012–2013	→ Toulouse (loan)	17	(0)
2013	→ Toulouse B (loan)	2	(1)
2014	→ San Jose Earthquakes (loan)	18	(3)
2015	→ Mordovia Saransk (loan)	16	(2)
2016	Ratchaburi	26	(15)
2017–2018	Vitória Setúbal	2	(0)
2018–2019	Ratchaburi	13	(1)
Total		231	(62)

International career
2005	Portugal U19	3	(0)
2005–2006	Portugal U20	7	(1)
2006–2009	Portugal U21	12	(1)
2009–2011	Portugal U23	2	(0)
2009	Portugal B	1	(1)
2010	Portugal	1	(0)
- * Club domestic league appearances and goals

Yannick dos Santos Djaló (born 5 May 1986) is a Portuguese former professional footballer who played as a forward or winger.

He spent most of his professional career with Sporting CP after reaching the club's youth system at the age of 15, going on to play 156 competitive games and win four major titles. He moved to Benfica in 2012 and won the Taça da Liga that year, but totalled only five appearances in 4 1/2 years, spending most of his time out on loan.

Djaló earned 22 caps for Portugal at youth level, and made his only senior appearance in 2010.

== Club career ==
=== Sporting CP ===
Born in Bissau, Guinea-Bissau, Djaló was brought up through Sporting CP's prolific youth system, and made his Primeira Liga debut on 16 September 2006, playing the second half of a 0–1 home loss against F.C. Paços de Ferreira. He proved himself a quality player, often coming off the bench, and also appeared in the club's campaign in the UEFA Champions League, renewing his contract during the season until 2013.

On 6 April 2008, after a four-month absence due to injury, Djaló scored both goals in a 2–0 home win over S.C. Braga, having also found the net the previous week as a substitute in a 4–1 away defeat of Associação Naval 1º de Maio. He finished the campaign in good form, netting the only goal in a win at Paços de Ferreira which proved crucial in helping the side to retain their second place in the league. In the Taça de Portugal, he scored twice in a thrilling 5–3 semi-final victory against city-rivals S.L. Benfica.

On 16 August 2008, Djaló scored both goals in Sporting's win against defending league champions FC Porto to claim the Supertaça Cândido de Oliveira for the second year in a row. During 2009–10 he was an everpresent attacking figure, up front or in the wings and, on 2 April 2010, he scored his first career hat-trick, at home against Rio Ave FC (5–0).

On 26 August 2010, Djaló scored in the 90th minute to help the Lions defeat Brøndby IF 3–0 after losing 2–0 at home, thus qualifying for the UEFA Europa League group stage.

=== Cancelled transfer to Nice ===
On 31 August 2011, the last day of the summer transfer window, Djaló left Sporting, signing for OGC Nice in Ligue 1 for €6 million. On 7 September, FIFA ruled that his transfer would be voided due to the move being completed following the closure of the transfer deadline, and the French club's officials announced that they would appeal the ruling.

After FIFA failed to take any action regarding the appeal, on 28 September, Nice executive Julien Fournier announced that the club would take the case to the Court of Arbitration for Sport (CAS). Two weeks later the appeal was rejected, which meant Djaló would not be eligible to represent a new team until January 2012; on the following day after the CAS ruling, Fournier confirmed to Portuguese radio station Rádio Renascença that the player would be returning to Sporting.

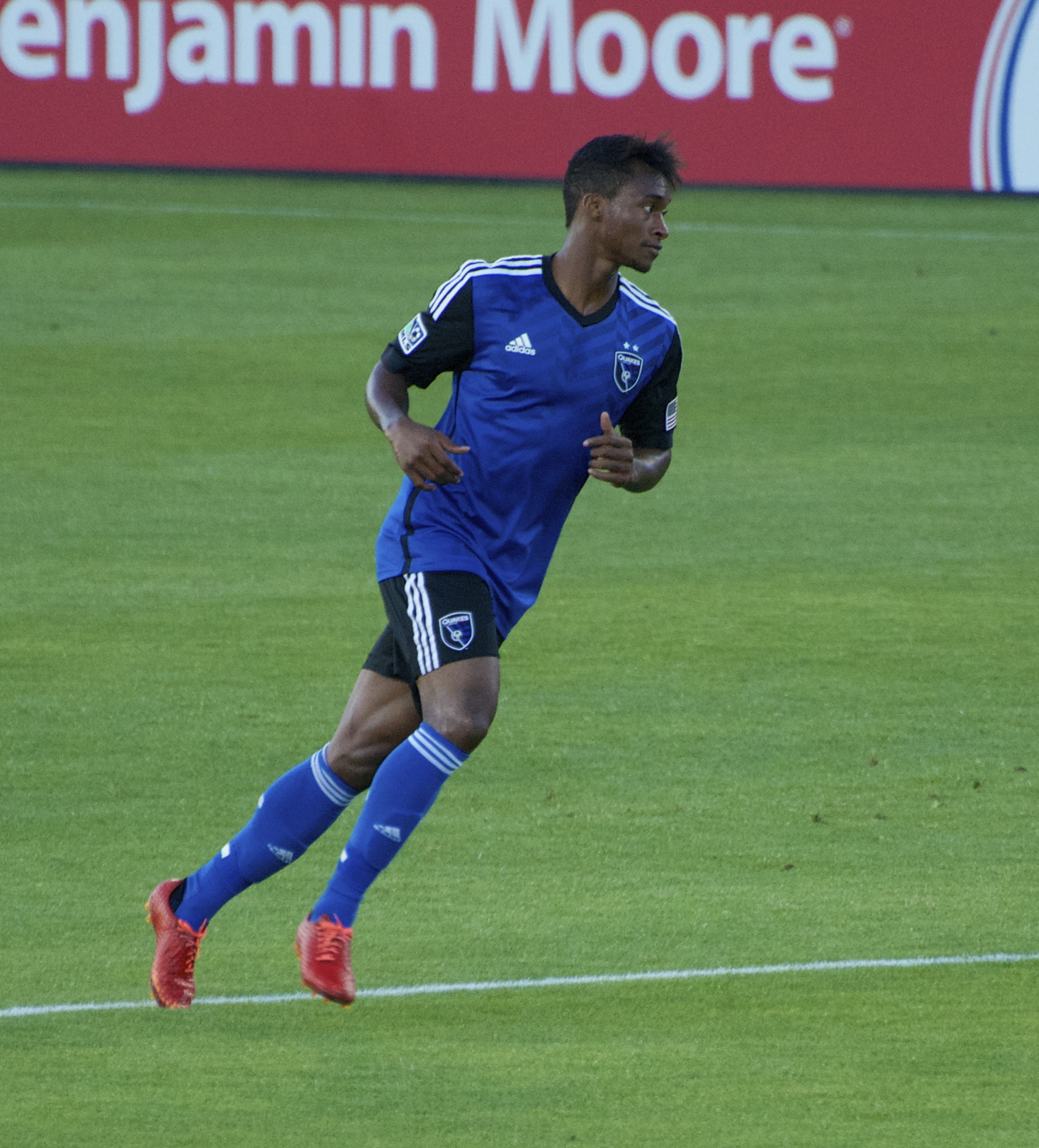
Djaló with San Jose Earthquakes

=== Benfica ===
On 31 January 2012, the free agent Djaló signed a four-and-a-half-year contract with Benfica. Exactly seven months later, he moved to another team in France's top flight, Toulouse FC, joining on loan with an option to make the move permanent at the end of the season.

Djaló was loaned to Major League Soccer side San Jose Earthquakes on 10 March 2014, until the end of the campaign. He subsequently returned to Benfica, being assigned to the B team in the Segunda Liga.

On 26 January 2015, Djaló was loaned to FC Mordovia Saransk in the Russian Premier League until the end of the season. The move was extended for another year on 7 August.

=== Later career ===
In February 2016, Djaló terminated his contract with Benfica, signing for one year with Ratchaburi F.C. from the Thai League 1 immediately after. On 24 August 2017, the 31-year-old returned to his country of adoption after agreeing to a one-year deal at Vitória de Setúbal; having made only two substitute appearances, he returned to Ratchaburi the following June.

== International career ==
Djaló chose to represent Portugal internationally, appearing for the country in various youth levels. Twelve days after his 2008 Supercup exploits, he was called up to the senior team by manager Carlos Queiroz, but did not make his debut.

In late August 2010, Djaló was selected for two UEFA Euro 2012 qualifiers after Porto's Silvestre Varela – his former Sporting teammate – suffered an injury. He finally made his debut on 3 September, playing the last six minutes of the 4–4 home draw against minnows Cyprus after replacing Hugo Almeida.

== Personal life ==
Born in Guinea-Bissau, Djaló lived most of his life in the Portuguese capital, Lisbon. His cousin José Embaló was also a footballer.

In May 2010, Djaló married singer and TV personality Luciana Abreu, subsequently taking his wife's surname and signing as "Yannick Abreu Djaló". The couple welcomed their first child, Lyonce Viktórya, early in the following year, the player having already fathered Christian Martim (born 2008) in a previous relationship.

== Career statistics ==
Appearances and goals by club, season and competition
Club	Season	League			National cup (Note: Includes Taça de Portugal, Coupe de France, Russian Cup, Thai FA Cup)		League cup (Note: Includes Taça da Liga and Coupe de la Ligue)		Continental		Other		Total	
Club	Season	Division	Apps	Goals	Apps	Goals	Apps	Goals	Apps	Goals	Apps	Goals	Apps	Goals
Sporting CP B	2003–04	Segunda Divisão	10	1	—		—		—		—		10	1
Casa Pia (loan)	2005–06	Segunda Divisão	26	16	0	0	—		—		—		26	16
Sporting CP	2006–07	Primeira Liga	24	5	6	1	—		5 (Note: Appearance(s) in UEFA Champions League)	0	—		35	6
Sporting CP	2007–08	Primeira Liga	16	5	2	2	2	0	6 (Note: Four appearances in UEFA Champions League, two appearances in UEFA Cup)	0	1 (Note: Appearance in Supertaça Cândido de Oliveira)	0	27	7
Sporting CP	2008–09	Primeira Liga	16	1	1	0	1	1	6	1	1	2	25	5
Sporting CP	2009–10	Primeira Liga	18	6	1	1	4	0	8 (Note: Four appearances in UEFA Champions League, four appearances in UEFA Europa League)	0	—		31	7
Sporting CP	2010–11	Primeira Liga	21	6	1	1	2	0	9 (Note: Appearances in UEFA Europa League)	2	—		33	9
Sporting CP	2011–12	Primeira Liga	3	0	0	0	0	0	2	0	—		5	0
Sporting CP	Total		98	23	11	5	9	1	36	3	2	2	156	34
Benfica (loan)	2011–12	Primeira Liga	3	0	0	0	1	0	1	0	—		5	0
Toulouse (loan)	2012–13	Ligue 1	17	0	2	0	1	1	—		—		20	1
Toulouse B (loan)	2012–13	Championnat de France Amateur 2	2	1	—		—		—		—		2	1
San Jose Earthquakes (loan)	2014	Major League Soccer	18	3	—		—		—		—		18	3
Mordovia Saransk (loan)	2014–15	Russian Premier League	9	1	1	0	—		—		—		10	1
Mordovia Saransk (loan)	2015–16	Russian Premier League	7	1	1	0	—		—		—		8	1
Mordovia Saransk (loan)	Total		16	2	2	0	—		—		—		18	2
Ratchaburi	2016	Thai League 1	26	15	—		—		—		—		26	15
Vitória Setúbal	2017–18	Primeira Liga	2	0	0	0	0	0	—		—		2	0
Ratchaburi	2018	Thai League 1	13	1	4	3	—		—		—		17	4
Career total			231	62	19	8	11	2	37	3	2	2	300	77

== Honours ==
Sporting CP

- Taça de Portugal: 2006–07, 2007–08
- Supertaça Cândido de Oliveira: 2007, 2008
- Taça da Liga runner-up: 2007–08, 2008–09

Benfica

- Taça da Liga: 2011–12
