= Bruno Matias (footballer, born 1989) =

Portuguese footballer

Personal information
- Full name: Bruno Filipe Santos Matias
- Date of birth: 3 April 1989 (age 37)
- Place of birth: Santarém, Portugal
- Height: 1.77 m (5 ft 10 in)
- Position: Attacking midfielder

Team information
- Current team: FC Etzella Ettelbruck
- Number: 29

Youth career
- 2004–2008: Sporting CP

Senior career*
| Years | Team | Apps | (Gls) |
| 2008–2009 | Fátima | 32 | (8) |
| 2009–2010 | Estoril | 16 | (1) |
| 2010–11 | U.D. Serra | 25 | (6) |
| 2011 | Amiense | 10 | (3) |
| 2012 | F91 Dudelange | 7 | (1) |
| 2013 | FC RM Hamm Benfica | 12 | (5) |
| 2013– | FC Etzella Ettelbruck | 11 | (8) |

International career^{‡}
| | Portugal U16 | 4 | (0) |
| | Portugal U17 | 17 | (11) |
| | Portugal U19 | 3 | (0) |
| | Portugal U21 | 3 | (3) |
- * Club domestic league appearances and goals as of 22 May 2013 ‡ National team caps and goals as of 22 May 2013

Bruno Filipe Santos Matias (born 4 March 1989, in Santarém) is a Portuguese footballer who plays for FC Etzella Ettelbruck, as a midfielder.
