= Igor Krutov =

Russian footballer

Personal information
- Full name: Igor Aleksandrovich Krutov
- Date of birth: 24 June 1995 (age 31)
- Place of birth: Volgograd, Russia
- Height: 1.72 m (5 ft 8 in)
- Position: Midfielder

Senior career*
Years	Team	Apps	(Gls)
2012–2015	FC Mordovia Saransk	5	(0)
2015	FC Astrakhan	5	(1)
2016–2018	FC Rotor Volgograd	57	(3)
2018	FC Chayka Peschanokopskoye	10	(1)
2019–2020	PFC Dynamo Stavropol	41	(2)
2021	PFC Dynamo Stavropol	4	(0)
- * Club domestic league appearances and goals

Igor Aleksandrovich Krutov (Russian: Игорь Александрович Крутов; born 24 June 1995) is a Russian former football midfielder.

== Club career ==
He made his debut in the Russian Football National League for FC Mordovia Saransk on 13 October 2013 in a game against FC Torpedo Moscow.
