= Paulo Batista Junior =

Brazilian field hockey player (born 1993)

Personal information
- Born: 27 January 1993 (age 33)

Sport
- Country: Brazil
- Sport: Field hockey

Paulo Batista Junior (born 27 January 1993) is a Brazilian field hockey player.

He competed in the men's field hockey tournament at the 2016 Summer Olympics.
