= Alex Zahavi =

Footballer (born 1991)

Personal information
- Full name: Alexander Abraham Zahavi
- Date of birth: 21 January 1991 (age 35)
- Place of birth: Los Angeles, California, United States
- Height: 5 ft 9 in (1.75 m)
- Positions: Winger; forward

Youth career
- 1998–1999: Hapoel Haifa
- 1999–2002: Benfica
- 2002–2004: Arsenal
- 2005–2007: Barcelona
- 2007–2010: Sporting CP

Senior career*
Years	Team	Apps	(Gls)
2010–2013	Maccabi Haifa	0	(0)
2011	→ Hapoel Acre (loan)	10	(0)
2011–2012	→ Vitória Setúbal (loan)	1	(0)
2012–2013	→ Olhanense (loan)	0	(0)

International career
	Portugal U16	7	(0)
2007	Portugal U17	8	(3)
	Portugal U18	9	(2)
	Portugal U19	3	(0)
2010	United States U20	2	(1)
2011	Israel U21	3	(1)
- * Club domestic league appearances and goals

Alexander "Alex" Abraham Zahavi (born 21 January 1991) is a former professional footballer who played as a winger or forward.

Zahavi was born in the United States, the son of a Portuguese mother and Israeli father. He has represented Portugal at youth levels but considered switching federations so he can represent the United States. He is the great nephew of football agent Pini Zahavi. Zahavi is a winger who plays on the left side of midfield, even though he is right-footed.

== Club career ==
On 16 July 2010, Zahavi joined Maccabi Haifa on trial trying to impress Elisha Levy. On 26 July he was presented as a Maccabi Haifa player after he signed a contract with the club.

Zahavi joined Israeli Premier League club Hapoel Acre in February 2011 on loan for the remainder of the 2010–11 season.

On 7 July, Maccabi Haifa announced that they extended Zahavi's contract through the 2015 season, and are loaning him to Primeira Liga team Vitória de Setúbal for the 2011–12 season. Zahavi joined Portuguese top-flight side S.C. Olhanense for the 2012–13 season.

== International career ==
Zahavi represented Portugal at various youth levels but was never called into the senior team. Because he played in an official UEFA U17 qualifying tournament for Portugal, he was cap tied to their national team under FIFA eligibility rules. However, since he is also eligible to play for Israel or the United States, he was allowed to file for a one-time only switch with FIFA.

Zahavi was called up to the United States U-20's team in November 2010 for the Torneo de las Americas.

On 20 February 2011, Zahavi was called in for his first Israel U-21 camp. Three days later Zahavi played in a friendly with the under-21 side against FC Arsenal Kyiv. In March 2011, Zahavi was brought in for another training camp. On 17 March 2011 Zahavi was named to the under-21 side for a tournament in Austria. Zahavi made his debut for the side in a friendly against Georgia on 23 March 2011. Zahavi scored his first goal for the under-21 side in a friendly against Romania on 26 March 2011 in Austria. Zahavi floated the ball over the Romanian goalkeeper from 35 metres out after exchanging passes with Nes Zamir.

== Career statistics ==
Appearances and goals by club, season and competition
Club	Season	League			National cup (Note: Includes Israel State Cup, Taca de Portugal.)		League cup (Note: Includes Toto Cup, Taça da Liga.)		Total	
Club	Season	Division	Apps	Goals	Apps	Goals	Apps	Goals	Apps	Goals
Maccabi Haifa	2010–11	Israeli Premier League	0	0	0	0	5	0	5	0
Hapoel Acre (loan)	2010–11	Israeli Premier League	10	0	0	0	0	0	10	0
Vitoria	2011–12	Primeira Liga	1	0	0	0	0	0	1	0
Olhanense	2012–13	Primeira Liga	0	0	0	0	0	0	0	0
Career total			11	0	0	0	5	0	17	0
