= Peter Caraballo =

Swiss-born Portuguese footballer

Personal information
- Full name: Peter Gabriel Carvalho Caraballo
- Date of birth: 25 September 1992 (age 34)
- Place of birth: Lausanne, Switzerland
- Height: 1.88 m (6 ft 2 in)
- Position: Forward

Team information
- Current team: Amora

Youth career
- 2004–2005: Lausanne
- 2005–2010: Sporting
- 2010–2011: Académica de Coimbra

Senior career*
Years	Team	Apps	(Gls)
2011–2012	Alcochetense	8	(0)
2012	Sacavenense	3	(0)
2013	Carregado	8	(0)
2013	Naval	4	(0)
2014–2015	Alcochetense	22	(15)
2015–2017	Oriental	37	(2)
2017	Fabril Barreiro	14	(3)
2018–	Amora	12	(2)
- * Club domestic league appearances and goals as of 24 May 2018

Peter Gabriel Carvalho Caraballo (born 25 September 1992) is a Portuguese footballer who plays for Amora FC as a forward. He also holds Uruguayan citizenship.

== Football career ==
On 2 August 2015, Caraballo made his professional debut with Oriental in a 2015–16 Taça da Liga match against Freamunde.
