= André Marques (footballer) =

Portuguese footballer

Personal information
- Full name: André Filipe Farias Marques
- Date of birth: 1 August 1987 (age 39)
- Place of birth: Laceiras, Portugal
- Height: 1.83 m (6 ft 0 in)
- Position: Left-back

Youth career
- 1996–1998: Almada Sul
- 1998–2000: Almada
- 2000–2005: Sporting CP

Senior career*
Years	Team	Apps	(Gls)
2005–2012	Sporting CP	9	(0)
2006–2007	→ Olivais Moscavide (loan)	20	(1)
2007	→ União Leiria (loan)	2	(0)
2008	→ Freamunde (loan)	10	(1)
2008–2009	→ Vitória Setúbal (loan)	14	(2)
2010	→ Iraklis (loan)	1	(0)
2010–2012	→ Beira-Mar (loan)	22	(0)
2012–2014	Sion	21	(0)
2014–2016	Moreirense	12	(0)
Total		111	(4)

International career
2007	Portugal U20	4	(0)
2007	Portugal U21	1	(0)
2009	Portugal B	1	(0)
2010–2011	Portugal U23	3	(0)
- * Club domestic league appearances and goals

André Filipe Farias Marques (born 1 August 1987) is a Portuguese former professional footballer who played as a left-back.

== Club career ==
Marques was born in Laceiras, Carregal do Sal, Viseu District. Having made his professional debut with Sporting CP in 2005–06, he spent the following season on loan to Segunda Liga's C.D. Olivais e Moscavide. He was also loaned the next year, upgrading to U.D. Leiria of the Primeira Liga; a lack of playing opportunities prompted another loan in February 2008, this time to S.C. Freamunde in the second division.

Marques was loaned again in 2008–09, now to Vitória F.C. as he was only fourth-choice for the Lisbon club. Following Aly Cissokho's departure to FC Porto in January 2009 he became the starter, scoring his first goal in the top flight on the 30th but in a 2–4 home loss against Vitória de Guimarães.

For the 2009–10 campaign, Marques was recalled by Sporting. In the preseason, as Leandro Grimi was still convalescing from a serious injury and veteran Marco Caneira was often played out of his centre-back position, he impressed and managed to make the roster, starting in the UEFA Champions League qualifiers against FC Twente (one match) and ACF Fiorentina (both).

Before 2010–11 started, Marques was told he was not part of newly appointed coach Paulo Sérgio's plans, which led to another loan deal, this time with S.C. Beira-Mar, recently promoted to the top tier. He stayed in Aveiro for the next season, but was sidelined for several months due to a knee injury.

Marques competed in the Swiss Super League from 2012 to 2014, with FC Sion. Twenty of his 21 appearances came in the former campaign, and he subsequently returned to his country's top division with Moreirense FC, again being bothered by persistent physical problems.

On 16 June 2017, after one year of inactivity, the 30-year-old Marques joined CSM Politehnica Iași from the Romanian Liga I. He was released less than one month later.

== International career ==
Marques was part of the Portugal squad at the 2007 FIFA U-20 World Cup help in Canada, making three appearances in a last-16 exit. His sole cap for the under-21s came before that tournament on 23 March, in a 2–0 friendly win over Slovakia in Amadora.

== Career statistics ==
As of 23 May 2009

Club	Season	League		Cup		League Cup		Europe		Total	
Club	Season	Apps	Goals	Apps	Goals	Apps	Goals	Apps	Goals	Apps	Goals
Sporting CP	2005–06	3	0	–		–		–		3	0
Sporting CP	Total	3	0	–		–		–		3	0
Olivais Moscavide	2006–07	20	1	–		–		–		20	1
Olivais Moscavide	Total	20	1	–		–		–		20	1
União Leiria	2007–08	2	0	–		1	0	–		3	0
União Leiria	Total	2	0	–		1	0	–		3	0
Freamunde	2007–08	10	1	–		–		–		10	1
Freamunde	Total	10	1	–		–		–		10	1
Vitória Setúbal	2008–09	14	2	–		2	0	–		16	2
Vitória Setúbal	Total	14	2	–		2	0	–		16	2
Career total		49	4	–		3	0	–		52	4
