= Leandro Grimi =

Argentine footballer

Personal information
- Full name: Leandro Damián Marcelo Grimi
- Date of birth: 9 February 1985 (age 41)
- Place of birth: San Lorenzo, Argentina
- Height: 1.75 m (5 ft 9 in)
- Position: Left-back

Youth career
- Huracán

Senior career*
Years	Team	Apps	(Gls)
2004–2006	Huracán	63	(10)
2006	Racing Club	11	(1)
2007–2008	Milan	3	(0)
2007	→ Siena (loan)	13	(0)
2008	→ Sporting CP (loan)	9	(0)
2008–2013	Sporting CP	35	(1)
2011–2012	→ Genk (loan)	7	(0)
2012–2013	→ Godoy Cruz (loan)	3	(1)
2013–2014	Godoy Cruz	32	(3)
2014–2018	Racing Club	65	(1)
2018–2019	Newell's Old Boys	0	(0)
2020–2021	Huracán	22	(0)
Total		263	(17)
- * Club domestic league appearances and goals

Leandro Damián Marcelo Grimi (born 9 February 1985) is an Argentine former professional footballer who played as a left-back.

== Club career ==
=== Early years and Milan ===
Born in San Lorenzo, Santa Fe, Grimi played for Huracán and Racing Club de Avellaneda in his homeland, appearing in 11 Primera División matches with the latter. In January 2007, the 22-year-old was signed by Italian club AC Milan for €2 million.

After taking part in a friendly with Birkirkara in the team's training camp in Malta, Grimi's competitive debut for the Rossoneri took place against Arezzo in a 2–0 win in that season's Coppa Italia. On 18 April 2007 he made his first appearance in Serie A, playing the last 12 minutes of the 5–2 victory at Ascoli.

Grimi spent the first half of the 2007–08 campaign on loan to Siena in the same league.

=== Sporting CP ===
Grimi joined Sporting CP in January 2008, also on loan. He played 20 official games in his first year – nine in the Primeira Liga – as his team finished in second position and also won the Taça de Portugal, with him featuring the full 120 minutes in a 2–0 extra time defeat of Porto.

On 13 July 2008, Milan announced Sporting had acquired Grimi on a permanent basis; he agreed to a five-year contract, with the latter paying the former €2.5 million plus 35% of a future transfer fee, while his minimum-fee release clause amounted to €25 million (Sporting were also able to acquire 5% of the player's rights for €200,000 every time they qualified for the UEFA Champions League). He scored his only goal in the Portuguese top tier on 14 March 2010, opening an eventual 3–1 home win over Vitória de Guimarães.

After the arrival of Evaldo from Braga in the 2010 off-season, Grimi became a fringe player, making just four overall appearances during the season – two in the league, totalling 253 minutes – and being loaned in the last day of the 2011 summer transfer window to Genk in the Belgian Pro League.

=== Later career ===
After leaving the Estádio José Alvalade in June 2013 as a free agent, Grimi represented Godoy Cruz, Racing Avellaneda, Newell's Old Boys and Huracán, always in his country's top flight.

Grimi announced his retirement on 18 February 2022, aged 37.

== Honours ==
Sporting CP

- Taça de Portugal: 2007–08
- Supertaça Cândido de Oliveira: 2008

Racing

- Argentine Primera División: 2014
