= João Gonçalves (footballer, born 1988) =

Portuguese footballer

Personal information
- Full name: João Pedro do Espírito Santo Gonçalves
- Date of birth: 18 January 1988 (age 38)
- Place of birth: Amadora, Portugal
- Height: 1.80 m (5 ft 11 in)
- Position: Right back

Youth career
- 1996–2007: Sporting CP

Senior career*
Years	Team	Apps	(Gls)
2007–2013	Sporting CP	0	(0)
2007–2008	→ Olivais Moscavide (loan)	29	(4)
2008–2012	→ Olhanense (loan)	66	(1)
2012–2013	Sporting CP B	3	(0)
2012–2013	→ Vitória Guimarães (loan)	3	(0)
Total		101	(5)

International career
2009–2010	Portugal U21	9	(0)

Managerial career
- 2013–2016: Sporting CP (assistant youth)
- 2016–2017: Sporting CP B (assistant)
- * Club domestic league appearances and goals

João Pedro do Espírito Santo Gonçalves (born 18 January 1988) is a Portuguese former footballer who played as a right back.

== Club career ==
Born in Amadora, Lisbon, Gonçalves joined Sporting CP's youth system at only eight, but never appeared for the club officially, being loaned for the duration of his spell. He represented C.D. Olivais e Moscavide (third division), S.C. Olhanense (Segunda Liga and Primeira Liga) and Vitória de Guimarães (top tier).

Gonçalves spent three of his four years with Algarve's Olhanense in the top flight, appearing in 21 games in the 2010–11 season (all starts, one goal against Vitória de Setúbal in a 3–1 home win) to help his team rank in 11th place. He retired in June 2013 at the age of only 25, due to recurrent knee injuries.

== International career ==
Gonçalves won 48 caps for Portugal across all youth levels, including nine for the under-21 side.
