= Victor Golas =

Brazilian footballer

Personal information
- Full name: Victor Hugo Mateus Golas
- Date of birth: 27 December 1990 (age 35)
- Place of birth: Arapongas, Brazil
- Height: 1.93 m (6 ft 4 in)
- Position: Goalkeeper

Team information
- Current team: Sisaket United

Youth career
- 2007: América-SP
- 2007–2009: Sporting CP

Senior career*
Years	Team	Apps	(Gls)
2009–2014	Sporting CP	0	(0)
2009–2010	→ Real Massamá (loan)	5	(0)
2010–2011	→ Boavista (loan)	26	(0)
2011–2012	→ Penafiel (loan)	24	(0)
2012–2014	Sporting CP B	27	(0)
2014–2015	Braga B	2	(0)
2015–2016	Botev Plovdiv	27	(0)
2017	Linense	10	(0)
2017	Londrina	0	(0)
2018	Linense	7	(0)
2018–2019	Trepça '89	4	(0)
2019	Maringá	11	(0)
2019–2020	Al-Khaleej	22	(0)
2020–2021	Marcílio Dias	8	(0)
2021	Panevėžys	15	(0)
2022	Rio Claro	18	(0)
2022	Inter de Limeira	0	(0)
2022	→ Botafogo-PB (loan)	9	(0)
2022	→ Novorizontino (loan)	0	(0)
2023	Rio Claro	12	(0)
2023	Inter de Limeira	12	(0)
2023	Marcílio Dias	0	(0)
2024–2025	Caxias	11	(0)
2026	XV de Piracicaba	24	(0)
2026–	Sisaket United	0	(0)
- * Club domestic league appearances and goals as of 16:10, 6 October 2026 (UTC)

Victor Hugo Mateus Golas (born 27 December 1990) is a Brazilian professional footballer who plays as a goalkeeper for Thai League 1 club Sisaket United.

== Club career ==
Born in Arapongas, Paraná of Polish descent, Golas joined Sporting CP's academy in 2007 at the age of 16. He was loaned to Real Massamá, Boavista and Penafiel in his first three seasons as a senior, making his professional debut with the latter club on 4 September 2011 in a 3–2 away win against União da Madeira in the Segunda Liga.

Returned to Lisbon in the summer of 2012, Golas was exclusively associated with the reserve side also in the second division. Released in June 2014, he signed with Braga. His input with their first team consisted of one game, the 2–0 victory over Rio Ave on 4 February 2015 in the group stage of the Taça da Liga.

Golas moved to Botev Plovdiv from Bulgaria on 3 August 2015. His first match in the First Professional Football League occurred six days later, in a 1–0 win at Pirin Blagoevgrad. On 3 July 2016, after making 31 competitive appearances, he left.

In the following years, save for a brief spell in the Football Superleague of Kosovo with Trepça '89 and a full season in the Saudi First Division League with Al-Khaleej, Golas played in his country's lower leagues. In June 2021, he signed for Lithuania's Panevėžys.

Golas settled rarely subsequently, representing Rio Claro (two stints), Inter de Limeira, Botafogo-PB, Novorizontino, Marcílio Dias, Caxias and XV de Piracicaba. In July 2026, he joined Thai League 1 side Sisaket United.

== Honours ==
Marcílio Dias

- Copa Santa Catarina: 2023
