= 2003–04 Sporting CP season =

Sporting CP
2003–04 season
- Manager: Fernando Santos
- Primeira Liga: 3rd
- Taça de Portugal: Fifth round
- UEFA Cup: Second Round
- Top goalscorer: League: Liédson (15); All: Liédson (19)
Home colours

The 2003–04 season was Sporting CP's 97th season in existence and 70th consecutive season in the top flight of Portuguese football.

== Season overview ==
The club had a disappointing season in the wake of teenage starlet Cristiano Ronaldo's transfer to Manchester United and Mario Jardel's transfer to Bolton Wanderers in August 2003.

Sporting began the season with a 2-1 away victory over Academica Coimbra, thanks to a last minute winning goal from Beto. Sporting then had irregular form for the next 6 matchdays, but then went on an 18-match unbeaten run. Sporting's form started to decline towards the end of the season, starting with a heavy 4-0 loss to Rio Ave on 27 March 2004. Sporting won their next three matches after that to bounce back from the heavy loss, but then lost matches to Boavista, União Leiria, and then lost the Lisbon derby to Benfica thanks to a late goal by Geovanni in the penultimate round of the season, which ended their hopes of qualifying to the Champions League the following season.

In the Portuguese Cup, the club was eliminated in the fifth round, by Vitoria Guimaraes, after entering in the fourth round. In the UEFA Cup, the club was eliminated at home in the second round with three goals in less than ten minutes by Turkish club Gençlerbirliği after having drawn the first leg.

== Squad ==
=== Goalkeepers ===
- (Portugal) Ricardo
- (Portugal) Nélson
- (Portugal) Tiago

=== Defenders ===
- (Argentina) Facundo Quiroga
- (Brazil) (Portugal) Ânderson Polga
- (Portugal) Hugo
- (Portugal) Mário Sérgio
- (Portugal) Miguel Garcia
- (Mozambique) (Portugal) Paíto
- (Portugal) Beto
- (Portugal) Luís Filipe
- (Portugal) Rui Jorge
- (Portugal) Santamaria
- (Romania) Eduardo Maldea

=== Midfielders ===
- (Portugal) Rui Bento
- (Portugal) Carlos Martins
- (Portugal) Pedro Barbosa
- (Chile) (Portugal) Rodrigo Tello
- (Portugal) Paulo Bento
- (Brazil) Fábio Rochemback
- (Portugal) Custódio
- (Brazil) Clayton
- (Spain) Toñito
- (Brazil) (Portugal) Tinga

=== Attackers ===
- (Romania) Marius Niculae
- (Portugal) Sá Pinto
- (Portugal) João Pinto
- (Portugal) Lourenço
- (Brazil) (Portugal) Elpídio Silva
- (Brazil) Liédson

== Competitions ==
=== Primeira Liga ===
==== Standings ====
Pos	Team	Pld	W	D	L	GF	GA	GD	Pts	Qualification or relegation
1	Porto (C)	34	25	7	2	63	19	+44	82	Qualification to Champions League group stage
2	Benfica	34	22	8	4	62	28	+34	74	Qualification to Champions League third qualifying round
3	Sporting CP	34	23	4	7	60	33	+27	73	Qualification to UEFA Cup first round (Note: Maritimo qualified for the UEFA Cup because Benfica, the Portuguese Cup winners, qualified for the Champions League.)
4	Nacional	34	17	5	12	56	35	+21	56	Qualification to UEFA Cup first round
5	Braga	34	15	9	10	36	38	−2	54	Qualification to UEFA Cup first round

Source: Foradejogo
Rules for classification: 1) points; 2) head-to-head points; 3) head-to-head goal difference; 4) goal difference; 5) number of goals scored
(C) Champions

==== Matches ====
16 August 2003 1	Académica Coimbra	1–2	Sporting
	Filipe Alvim 52'		Luis Lourenço 67'; Beto 90+2'

23 August 2003 2	Sporting	4–2	Belenenses
	Fábio Rochemback (15 p); Toñito 29' 60'; Luis Lourenço 57'		Sousa 30'; Leonardo 46'

2 September 2003 3	Porto	4–1	Sporting
	Derlei 3'; E. Jankauskas 51'; Maniche 64'; Benni McCarthy (89 p)		Fabio Rochemback 79'

14 September 2003 4	Sporting	2–0	Nacional
	Fábio Rochemback 20'; Toñito 34'

20 September 2003 5	Moreirense	1–0	Sporting
	Manoel 90+3'

29 September 2003 6	Sporting	1–0	Gil Vicente
	Rodrigo Tello 90+5'

4 October 2003 7	Maritimo	2–1	Sporting

20 October 2003 8	Sporting	3–1	Beira-Mar

26 October 2003 9	Alverca	1–2	Sporting

1 November 2003 10	Sporting	1–1	Rio Ave

10 November 2003 11	Pacos de Ferreira	1–2	Sporting

1 December 2003 12	Sporting	2–0	Braga

7 December 2003 13	Estrela Amadora	1–4	Sporting

13 December 2003 14	Sporting	1–0	Boavista

20 December 2003 15	Sporting	2–0	UD Leiria

4 January 2004 16	Benfica	1–3	Sporting

9 January 2004 17	Sporting	2–1	Vitoria Guimaraes

17 January 2004 18	Sporting	2–0	Academica

24 January 2004 19	Belenenses	1–3	Sporting

31 January 2004 20	Sporting	1–1	Porto

7 February 2004 21	Nacional	3–3	Sporting

13 February 2004 22	Sporting	1–0	Moreirense

22 February 2004 23	Gil Vicente	1–1	Sporting

28 February 2004 24	Sporting	1–0	Maritimo

6 March 2004 25	Beira-Mar	0–2	Sporting

15 March 2004 26	Sporting	2–0	Alverca

20 March 2004 27	Rio Ave	4–0	Sporting

27 March 2004 28	Sporting	1–0	Pacos de Ferreira

4 April 2004 29	Braga	2–3	Sporting

10 April 2004 30	Sporting	4–0	Estrela da Amadora

17 April 2004 31	Boavista	2–1	Sporting

24 April 2004 32	União Leiria	1–0	Sporting

2 May 2004 33	Sporting	0–1	Benfica

9 May 2004 34	Vitoria Guimaraes	0–2	Sporting

- Marítimo-Sporting 2-1
- 0-1 Liédson 23'
- 1-1 Marcelo Carioca 62'
- 2-1 Alan 90+6'
- Sporting-Beira-Mar 3-1
- 1-0 Liédson 9'
- 1-1 Sandro 25'
- 2-1 João Pinto 45'
- 3-1 Liédson 73'
- Alverca-Sporting 1-2
- 1-0 Torrão 8'
- 1-1 Fábio Rochemback 29' (pen.)
- 1-2 Liédson 53'
- Sporting-Rio Ave 1-1
- 0-1 Evandro 45'
- 1-1 Silva 84'
- Paços de Ferreira-Sporting 1-2
- 0-1 Pedro Barbosa 19'
- 1-1 Zé Manuel 52'
- 1-2 Pedro Barbosa 75' (pen.)
- Sporting-Braga 2-0
- 1-0 João Pinto 29'
- 2-0 Silva 59'
- Estrela Amadora-Sporting 1-4
- 0-1 Fábio Rochemback 16'
- 1-1 Júlio César 35'
- 1-2 Pedro Barbosa 40'
- 1-3 Liédson 67'
- 1-4 Liédson 89'
- Sporting-Boavista 1-0
- 1-0 Silva 32'
- Benfica-Sporting 1-3
- 0-1 Fábio Rochemback 8' (pen.)
- 0-2 Silva 33'
- 1-2 Luisão 56'
- 1-3 Sá Pinto 90+2'
- Sporting-Vitória Guimarães 2-1
- 0-1 Romeu 21'
- 1-1 João Pinto 31'
- 2-1 Pedro Barbosa 42'
- Sporting-Académica 2-0
- 1-0 Liédson 42'
- 2-0 Pedro Barbosa 90+1'
- Belenenses-Sporting 1-3
- 1-0 Marco Paulo 30'
- 1-1 Sá Pinto 33'
- 1-2 João Pinto 67'
- 1-3 Liédson 90+3'
- Sporting-Porto 1-1
- 0-1 Jorge Costa 9'
- 1-1 Pedro Barbosa 69' (pen.)
- Nacional-Sporting 3-3
- 0-1 Sá Pinto 39'
- 1-1 Gouveia 42'
- 2-1 Adriano 49'
- 2-2 Marius Niculae 62'
- 2-3 Lourenço 73'
- 3-3 Carlos Álvarez 87'
- Sporting-Moreirense 1-0
- 1-0 Fábio Rochemback 34'
- Gil Vicente-Sporting 1-1
- 1-0 Luís Loureiro 18' (pen.)
- 1-1 Carlos Martins 70'
- Sporting-Marítimo 1-0
- 1-0 Beto 81'
- Beira-Mar-Sporting 0-2
- 0-1 Pedro Barbosa 9' (pen.)
- 0-2 Fábio Rochemback 11'
- Sporting-Alverca 2-0
- 1-0 Carlos Martins 31'
- 2-0 Liédson 89'
- Rio Ave-Sporting 4-0
- 1-0 Evandro 16'
- 2-0 Jaime 25'
- 3-0 Paulo César 45'
- 4-0 Evandro 77'
- Sporting-Paços de Ferreira 1-0
- 1-0 Liédson 88'
- Braga-Sporting 2-3
- 0-1 Silva 11'
- 0-2 Liédson 31'
- 0-3 Pedro Barbosa 67' (pen.)
- 1-3 Henrique 75'
- 2-3 Henrique 85'
- Sporting-Estrela Amadora 4-0
- 1-0 Liédson 33'
- 2-0 Liédson 58'
- 3-0 Marius Niculae 78'
- 4-0 Liédson 82'
- Boavista-Sporting 2-1
- 0-1 Liédson 59'
- 1-1 Frechaut 83'
- 2-1 Fary Faye 88'
- União Leiria-Sporting 1-0
- 1-0 Alhandra 50'
- Sporting-Benfica 0-1
- 0-1 Geovanni 88'
- Vitória Guimarães-Sporting 0-2
- 0-1 Marius Niculae 73'
- 0-2 João Pinto 83'

=== Taca de Portugal ===
==== Fourth Round ====
23 November 2003	1º Dezembro	0–2	Sporting CP	Sintra, Portugal
			Liedson 46'; Clayton 66' (o.g.)

==== Fifth Round ====
17 December 2003	Sporting CP	0–1	Vitória de Guimarães	Lisbon
			Orestes 7'	Stadium: Estadio Jose Alvalade

=== UEFA Cup ===
==== Matches ====
First Round

24 September 2003 First leg	Sporting	2–0	Malmo	Lisbon
	Luís Lourenço 15'; Liedson 85'			Stadium: Estadio Jose Alvalade

15 October 2003 second leg	Malmo	0–1 (0–3 agg.)	Sporting	Malmo
		Report	Liedson 49'	Stadium: Malmö Stadion

Second Round

6 November 2003 first leg	Gençlerbirliği	1–1	Sporting CP	Ankara
	V. Cihan 55'	Report	Liedson 50'	Stadium: 19 Mayıs Stadium

27 November 2003 second leg	Sporting CP	0–3 (1–4 agg.)	Gençlerbirliği	Lisbon
		Report	A. Tandogan 44'; Mário Sérgio 45' (o.g.); V. Cihan 48'	Stadium: Estadio Jose Alvalade

== Player statistics ==
Top Scorers
Player	Goals
(Brazil) Liédson	15
(Brazil) Fábio Rochemback	7
(Brazil) Silva	5
(Portugal) João Pinto	5
