= 2003–04 Primeira Liga =

70th season of top-tier Portuguese football

Primeira Liga
- Season: 2003–04
- Dates: 16 August 2003 – 9 May 2004
- Champions: Porto; 20th title
- Relegated: Alverca; Paços de Ferreira; Estrela da Amadora
- Champions League: Porto; Benfica
- UEFA Cup: Sporting CP; Nacional; Braga; Marítimo
- Matches: 306
- Goals: 726 (2.37 per match)
- Top goalscorer: Benni McCarthy (20 goals)
- Biggest home win: Gil Vicente 5–1 Estrela da Amadora (23 September 2003); Nacional 5–1 Braga (25 January 2004)
- Biggest away win: Académica 0–5 Belenenses (21 February 2004)
- Highest scoring: Gil Vicente 4–4 Nacional (7 December 2003)

The 2003–04 Primeira Liga was the 70th edition of top flight of Portuguese football. It started 16 August 2003 with an opening game between Académica de Coimbra and Sporting Clube de Portugal, and ended on 9 May 2004. It was contested by 18 teams. FC Porto were the defending champions and became champions again, winning the Portuguese title in two consecutive seasons.

The first goal of the season was scored by Académica's Filipe Alvim in the opening game against Sporting CP. The first red card of the season was given to Paços de Ferreira's Portuguese midfielder Pedrinha in the 3rd game of the season against Nacional and the first yellow card was given to Sporting's Portuguese midfielder Custódio in the opening game of the season. Porto's Benni McCarthy was the top scorer of the season, scoring 20 goals.

Porto qualified for the 2004–05 UEFA Champions League group stage, along with Benfica, who qualified for the third round. Sporting, Nacional, Braga and Marítimo qualified for the 2004–05 UEFA Cup; in opposite, Alverca, Paços de Ferreira and Estrela da Amadora were relegated to the Segunda Liga.

== Promotion and relegation ==
Teams relegated to Segunda Liga

- Varzim
- Santa Clara
- Vitória de Setúbal

Varzim, Santa Clara, and Vitória de Setúbal were consigned to the Liga de Honra following their final classification in 2002–03 season.

Teams promoted from Segunda Liga

- Rio Ave
- Alverca
- Estrela da Amadora

The other three teams were replaced by Rio Ave, Alverca, Estrela da Amadora from Segunda Liga.

== Teams ==
Location of teams in the 2003-04 Liga
Location of teams in the 2003-04 Liga

=== Team summaries ===
Club	Head coach	City	Stadium	2002–2003 season
Académica de Coimbra	(Portugal) João Carlos Pereira	Coimbra	Estádio Cidade de Coimbra	15th
Alverca	(Portugal) José Couceiro	Alverca	Complexo Desportivo FC Alverca	2nd in the Segunda Liga
Belenenses	(Portugal) Augusto Inácio	Lisbon	Estádio do Restelo	9th
Benfica	(Spain) José Camacho	Lisbon	Estádio da Luz	2nd
Boavista	(Portugal) Jaime Pacheco	Porto	Estádio do Bessa	10th
Braga	(Portugal) Jesualdo Ferreira	Braga	Estádio Municipal de Braga	14th
Estrela da Amadora	(Portugal) Miguel Quaresma	Amadora	Estádio José Gomes	3rd in the Segunda Liga
Gil Vicente	(Portugal) Luís Campos	Barcelos	Estádio Cidade de Barcelos	8th
União de Leiria	(Portugal) Vítor Pontes	Leiria	Estádio Dr. Magalhães Pessoa	5th
Marítimo	(Portugal) Manuel Cajuda	Funchal	Estádio dos Barreiros	7th
Nacional	(Brazil) Casemiro Mior	Funchal	Estádio da Madeira	11th
Paços de Ferreira	(Portugal) José Mota	Paços de Ferreira	Estádio da Mata Real	6th
Beira-Mar	(Portugal) António Sousa	Aveiro	Estádio Municipal de Aveiro	13th
Moreirense	(Portugal) Manuel Machado	Guimarães	Estádio do Moreirense	12th
Porto	(Portugal) José Mourinho	Porto	Estádio do Dragão	1st
Sporting CP	(Portugal) Fernando Santos	Lisbon	Estádio José Alvalade	3rd
Rio Ave	(Portugal) Carlos Brito	Vila do Conde	Estádio dos Arcos	1st in the Segunda Liga
Vitória de Guimarães	(Portugal) Jorge Jesus	Guimarães	Estádio D. Afonso Henriques	4th

=== Managerial changes ===
Team	Outgoing manage	Manner	Date of vacancy	Incoming manager	Date of appointment
Académica de Coimbra	(Portugal) Artur Jorge	Resigned	28 August 2003	(Portugal) Vítor Oliveira	28 August 2003
Vitória de Guimarães	(Portugal) Augusto Inácio	Sacked	8 December 2003	(Portugal) Jorge Jesus	8 December 2003
Paços de Ferreira	(Portugal) José Gomes	Mutual Consent	21 October 2003	(Portugal) José Mota	22 October 2003
Estrela da Amadora	(Portugal) João Alves	Sacked	3 November 2003	(Portugal) Miguel Quaresma	3 November 2003
Gil Vicente	(Portugal) Mário Reis	Sacked	11 November 2003	(Portugal) Luís Campos	25 November 2003
Belenenses	(Portugal) Manuel José	Resigned	22 November 2003	(Serbia and Montenegro) Bogićević	23 November 2003
Belenenses	(Serbia and Montenegro) Bogićević	Sacked	19 January 2004	(Portugal) Augusto Inácio	20 January 2004
Académica de Coimbra	(Portugal) Vítor Oliveira	Sacked	26 January 2004	(Portugal) João Pereira	27 January 2004
Boavista	(Bolivia) Erwin Sánchez	Sacked	8 March 2004	(Portugal) Jaime Pacheco	8 March 2004

== League table ==
Pos	Team	Pld	W	D	L	GF	GA	GD	Pts	Qualification or relegation
1	Porto (C)	34	25	7	2	63	19	+44	82	Qualification to Champions League group stage
2	Benfica	34	22	8	4	62	28	+34	74	Qualification to Champions League third qualifying round
3	Sporting CP	34	23	4	7	60	33	+27	73	Qualification to UEFA Cup first round (Note: Maritimo qualified for the UEFA Cup because Benfica, the Portuguese Cup winners, qualified for the Champions League.)
4	Nacional	34	17	5	12	56	35	+21	56	Qualification to UEFA Cup first round
5	Braga	34	15	9	10	36	38	−2	54	Qualification to UEFA Cup first round
6	Marítimo	34	12	12	10	35	33	+2	48	Qualification to UEFA Cup first round
7	Rio Ave	34	12	12	10	42	37	+5	48	
8	Boavista	34	12	11	11	32	31	+1	47	
9	Moreirense	34	12	10	12	33	33	0	46	
10	União de Leiria	34	11	12	11	43	45	−2	45	Qualification to Intertoto Cup third round
11	Beira-Mar	34	11	8	15	36	45	−9	41	
12	Gil Vicente	34	10	10	14	43	40	+3	40	
13	Académica	34	11	5	18	40	42	−2	38	
14	Vitória de Guimarães	34	9	10	15	31	40	−9	37	
15	Belenenses	34	8	11	15	35	54	−19	35	
16	Alverca (R)	34	10	5	19	33	49	−16	35	Relegation to Segunda Liga
17	Paços de Ferreira (R)	34	8	4	22	27	53	−26	28	Relegation to Segunda Liga
18	Estrela da Amadora (R)	34	4	5	25	22	74	−52	17	Relegation to Segunda Liga

Source: Foradejogo
Rules for classification: 1) points; 2) head-to-head points; 3) head-to-head goal difference; 4) goal difference; 5) number of goals scored
(C) Champions; (R) Relegated

== Results ==
Home \ Away	ACA	ALV	BEM	BEL	BEN	BOA	BRA	EST	GVI	MAR	MOR	NAC	PAÇ	POR	RAV	SCP	ULE	VGU
Académica		4–0	0–1	0–1	1–3	1–0	0–1	4–1	2–1	2–0	0–3	0–1	3–2	0–1	0–0	1–2	1–2	1–1
Alverca	2–1		1–2	1–0	0–3	1–1	1–2	3–0	0–0	0–1	1–2	2–1	2–1	1–2	1–0	1–2	1–4	1–4
Beira-Mar	0–0	1–0		2–0	0–1	0–2	0–2	3–0	1–1	2–2	1–0	1–0	4–1	0–0	1–1	0–2	4–2	2–2
Belenenses	0–5	2–0	1–0		0–2	1–1	0–2	4–0	2–0	2–2	0–0	0–1	0–2	1–4	3–0	1–3	1–1	2–0
Benfica	2–0	2–0	1–2	3–3		3–2	2–0	3–1	2–1	1–0	1–1	1–0	2–1	1–1	2–0	1–3	0–0	2–0
Boavista	0–0	2–1	1–0	1–1	0–0		1–1	1–2	0–3	2–1	1–0	2–1	1–1	0–1	1–1	2–1	1–0	1–0
Braga	2–1	0–0	0–2	2–1	0–3	0–0		2–1	2–1	0–0	1–1	1–0	2–1	0–3	1–1	2–3	3–1	2–1
Estrela da Amadora	2–1	0–3	2–2	2–2	0–3	2–1	0–1		1–1	1–0	1–2	0–1	0–1	1–1	1–4	1–4	0–0	0–1
Gil Vicente	0–1	0–1	3–0	0–0	1–2	0–1	1–0	5–1		2–1	1–0	4–4	2–0	2–0	1–2	1–1	2–0	1–1
Marítimo	0–2	1–1	1–0	2–0	1–1	0–0	1–1	1–0	2–0		1–0	2–0	2–0	2–2	1–0	2–1	2–2	1–1
Moreirense	1–1	3–1	3–1	0–0	1–4	2–1	0–2	1–0	0–0	3–0		2–1	1–0	1–1	1–0	1–0	0–0	1–1
Nacional	2–1	3–0	3–0	4–0	3–2	1–0	5–1	4–0	2–1	0–1	3–1		2–0	0–0	4–0	3–3	0–2	4–2
Paços de Ferreira	1–0	0–3	2–1	1–1	0–3	0–3	0–1	1–0	3–2	0–1	1–0	1–1		0–2	1–2	1–2	1–2	1–0
Porto	4–1	1–0	3–0	4–1	2–0	1–0	2–0	2–0	4–1	1–0	1–0	1–0	3–1		1–0	4–1	2–1	3–0
Rio Ave	3–2	1–2	1–1	4–1	1–1	1–2	0–0	3–1	1–1	2–1	1–1	0–0	2–1	1–0		4–0	3–0	1–0
Sporting CP	2–0	2–0	3–1	4–2	0–1	1–0	2–0	4–0	1–0	1–0	1–0	2–0	1–0	1–1	1–1		2–0	2–1
União de Leiria	0–2	2–1	2–1	1–1	3–3	2–0	2–2	4–1	2–2	2–2	2–1	0–1	1–0	1–3	1–1	1–0		0–0
Vitória de Guimarães	1–2	2–2	2–0	0–1	0–1	1–1	1–0	1–0	0–2	1–1	3–0	2–1	1–1	1–2	2–0	0–2	1–0	

Source: Foradejogo (in Portuguese)
Legend: Blue = home team win; Yellow = draw; Red = away team win.

== Statistics ==
=== Top goal scorers ===
Rank	Scorer	Club	Goals
1	(South Africa) Benni McCarthy	Porto	20
2	(Brazil) Adriano	Nacional	19
3	(Brazil) Evandro	Rio Ave	15
3	(Brazil) Liédson	Sporting	15
5	(Portugal) Ricardo Sousa	Boavista	14
6	(Brazil) Derlei	Porto	13
7	(Portugal) Simão Sabrosa	Benfica	12
8	(Portugal) Zé Manuel	Paços de Ferreira	11
8	(Brazil) Ferreira	Gil Vicente	11
8	(Brazil) Wender	Braga	11

=== Hat-tricks ===
Player	Nationality	For	Against	Result	Date
Henry Antchouet	Gabon	Belenenses	Estrela da Amadora	4–0	7 September 2003
Adriano	Brazil	Nacional	Vitória de Guimarães	4–2	5 October 2003
Liédson	Brazil	Sporting	Estrela da Amadora	4–0	10 April 2004
Adriano Rossato	Brazil	Nacional	Beira Mar	3-0	25 April 2004
Benni McCarthy	South Africa	Porto	Paços de Ferreira	3–1	9 May 2004

== Awards ==
=== Monthly awards ===
Month	Player of the Month	
Month	Player	Club
September	(Brazil) Juninho Petrolina	Beira-Mar
October	(Brazil) Derlei	FC Porto
November	(Portugal) Pedro Barbosa	Sporting CP
December	(Brazil) Evandro	Rio Ave
January	(South Africa) Benni McCarthy	FC Porto
February	(Portugal) Petit	Benfica
March	(Cameroon) Doula	Sporting CP
April	(Brazil) Rossato	Nacional
May	(South Africa) Benni McCarthy	FC Porto

=== Annual awards ===
Portuguese Silver Boot

The Portuguese Silver Boot award was won by the South African Benni McCarthy of Porto, by scoring 20 goals.

== Attendances ==
#	Club	Average
1	Porto	34,143
2	Sporting	30,958
3	Benfica	28,395
4	Vitória SC	10,728
5	Braga	9,441
6	Académica	7,693
7	Beira-Mar	6,990
8	Boavista	5,806
9	União de Leiria	5,509
10	Os Belenenses	5,353
11	Marítimo	4,735
12	Moreirense	3,647
13	Rio Ave	3,324
14	Paços de Ferreira	3,300
15	CD Nacional	3,047
16	Gil Vicente	2,788
17	Alverca	2,382
18	Estrela da Amadora	2,176
