= SJPF Player of the Month =

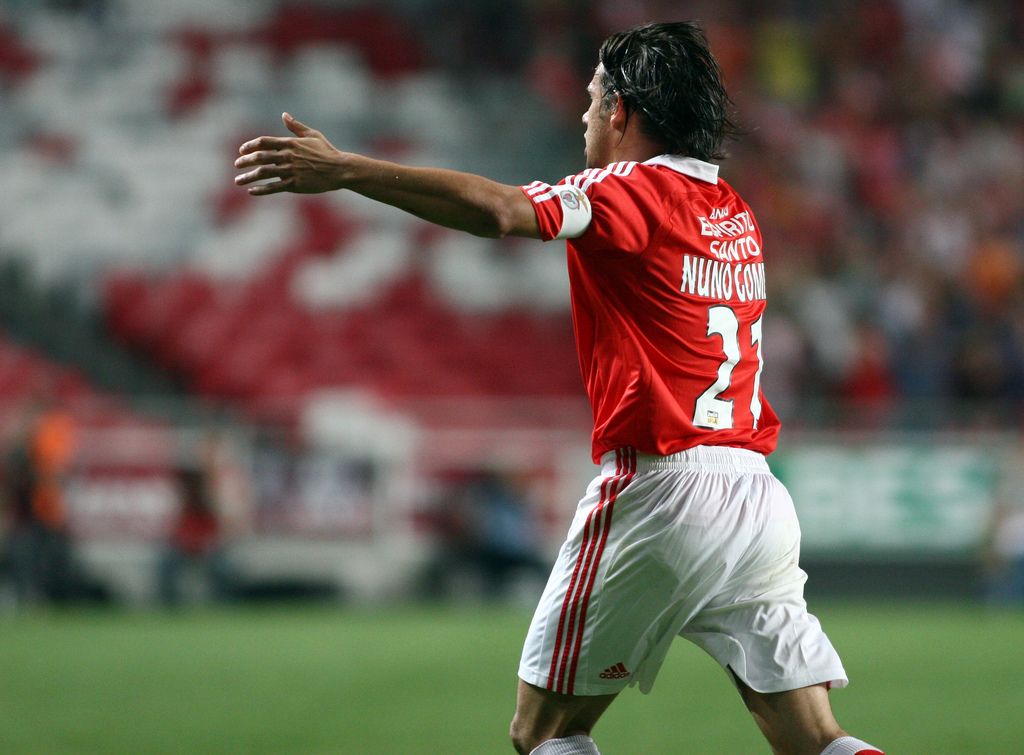
Nuno Gomes was the first player to win the award twice in a row, in 2005.

The SJPF Player of the Month (often called Portuguese League Player of the Month) is an association football award that recognizes the best Portuguese League player each month of the season and is conceived by the SJPF (syndicate of professional football players). The award has been presented since the 2003–04 season and the recipient is based on individual scores assigned by the three national sports dailies, A Bola, Record, and O Jogo. The first winner of the award was Beira-Mar midfielder Juninho Petrolina in September 2003. Hulk has won the award six times. Pedro Barbosa became the first Portuguese to win the award in November 2003. The "Big Three" (Benfica, Porto and Sporting CP) have had the most winners.

Prior to the 2012–13 Primeira Liga season, the SJPF announced that the SJPF Primeira Liga Player of the Month award would be awarded to a player on a bimonthly status with one player receiving an award for two months of football that have been played. The awards would be awarded during the following periods:

- August and September (Awarded to the Player of the Month in relation to football being played between Gameweek 1 to Gameweek 6)
- October and November (Awarded to the Player of the Month in relation to football being played between Gameweek 7 to Gameweek 11)
- December (Awarded to the Player of the Month in relation to football being played between Gameweek 12 to Gameweek 14)
- January (Awarded to the Player of the Month in relation to football being played between Gameweek 15 to Gameweek 18)
- February (Awarded to the Player of the Month in relation to football being played between Gameweek 19 to Gameweek 222)
- March (Awarded to the Player of the Month in relation to football being played between Gameweek 23 to Gameweek 36)
- April (Awarded to the Player of the Month in relation to football being played between Gameweek 27 to Gameweek 30)

== Winners ==
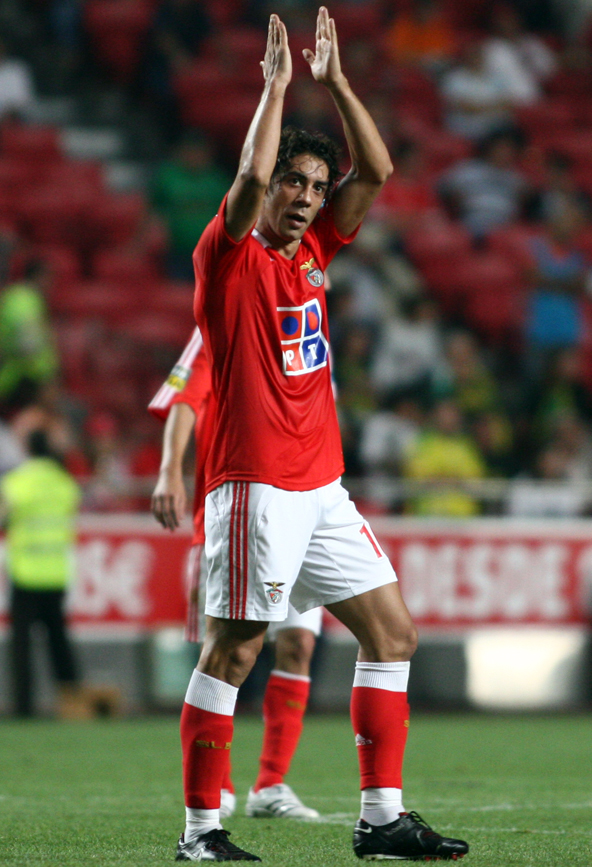
Rui Costa won the award in September 2007, aged 35.

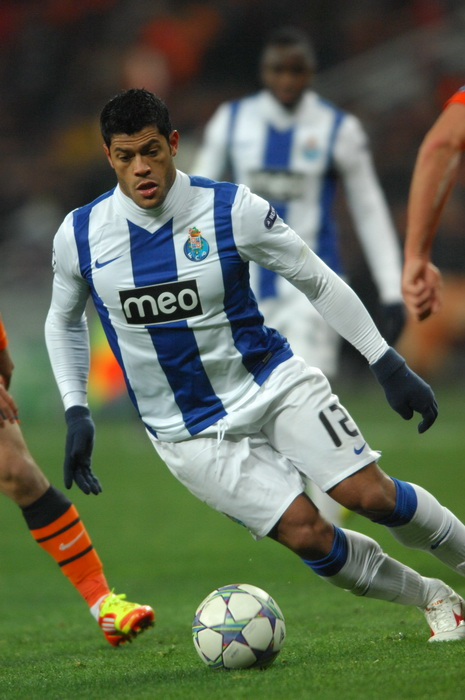
Hulk won the award a record six times.

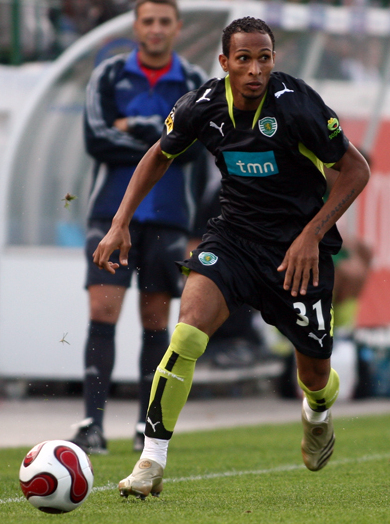
Liédson was the first player to be awarded five times.

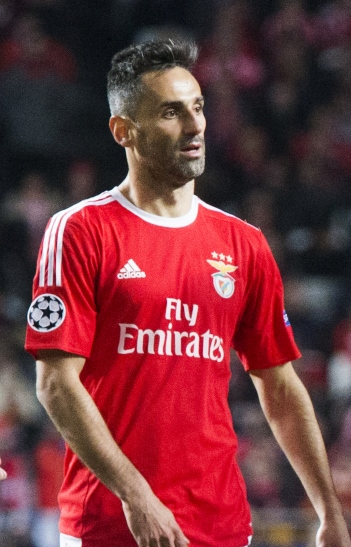
Jonas has won the award nine times, and is the only player to have won it four consecutive times.

Key

†	Award was shared with another player
GK	Goalkeeper
DF	Defender
MF	Midfielder
FW	Forward

Month	Year (Note: Each year is linked to an article on the particular season associated with the month of that year.)	Nationality	Player	Team	Position	Ref
September	2003	Brazil	Juninho Petrolina	Beira-Mar	MF	
October	2003	Brazil	Derlei	Porto	FW	
November	2003	Portugal	Pedro Barbosa	Sporting CP	MF	
December	2003	Brazil	Evandro	Rio Ave	FW	
January	2004	South Africa	Benni McCarthy	Porto	FW	
February	2004	Portugal	Petit	Benfica	MF	
March	2004	Cameroon	Roudolphe Douala	Sporting CP	FW	
April	2004	Brazil	Adriano Rossato	Nacional	DF	
May	2004	South Africa	Benni McCarthy	Porto	FW	
September	2004	Netherlands	Mitchell van der Gaag	Marítimo	DF	
October	2004	South Africa	Benni McCarthy	Porto	FW	
November	2004	Portugal	Simão	Benfica	FW	
December	2004	Brazil	Helton	União de Leiria	GK	
January	2005	Portugal	João Alves	Braga	MF	
February	2005	Brazil	Geovanni	Benfica	FW	
March	2005	Portugal	Miguel	Benfica	DF	
April	2005	Portugal	João Moutinho	Sporting CP	MF	
May	2005	Brazil	Nei	Moreirense	FW	
September	2005	Portugal	Nuno Gomes	Benfica	FW	
October	2005	Portugal	Nuno Gomes	Benfica	FW	
November	2005	Portugal	Ricardo Quaresma	Porto	FW	
December	2005	Portugal	Ricardo Quaresma	Porto	FW	
January	2006	Portugal	Liédson	Sporting CP	FW	
February	2006	Portugal	João Pinto	Boavista	FW	
March	2006	Brazil	Léo	Benfica	DF	
April	2006	Brazil	Pepe	Porto	DF	
September	2006	Senegal	Modou Sougou	União de Leiria	MF	
October	2006	Portugal	Simão	Benfica	FW	
November	2006	Portugal	Ricardo Quaresma	Porto	FW	
December	2006	Portugal	Ricardo Quaresma	Porto	FW	
January	2007	Portugal	Quim	Benfica	GK	
February	2007	Portugal	Simão	Benfica	FW	
March	2007	Brazil	Ânderson Polga	Sporting CP	DF	
April	2007	Portugal	Liédson	Sporting CP	FW	
May	2007	Argentina	Leandro Romagnoli	Sporting CP	MF	
September	2007	Portugal	Rui Costa	Benfica	MF	
October	2007	Argentina	Lucho González	Porto	MF	
November	2007	Portugal	Jorge Ribeiro	Boavista	DF	
December	2007	Liechtenstein	Peter Jehle	Boavista	GK	
January	2008	Argentina	Lisandro López	Porto	FW	
February	2008	Argentina	Lisandro López	Porto	FW	
March	2008	Brazil	Pitbull	Vitória de Setúbal	FW	
April	2008	Uruguay	Luis Aguiar	Académica de Coimbra	FW	
September	2008	Algeria	Hassan Yebda	Benfica	MF	
October	2008	Portugal	Bruno Braga	Leixões	MF	
November	2008	Portugal	Beto	Leixões	GK	
December	2008	Slovakia	Boris Peškovič	Académica de Coimbra	GK	
January	2009	Portugal	Liédson	Sporting CP	FW	
February	2009	Brazil	Hulk	Porto	FW	
March	2009	Senegal	Baba Diawara	Marítimo	FW	
April	2009	Portugal	Liédson	Sporting CP	FW	
May	2009	Paraguay	Óscar Cardozo	Benfica	FW	
September	2009	Brazil	Alan	Braga	FW	
October	2009	Angola	Djalma	Marítimo	FW	
November	2009	Portugal	João Tomás	Rio Ave	FW	
December	2009	Argentina	Javier Saviola	Benfica	FW	
January	2010	Brazil	Mossoró	Braga	MF	
February	2010	Portugal	Júlio Coelho	Paços de Ferreira	GK	
March	2010	Portugal	Liédson	Sporting CP	FW	
April	2010	Argentina	Ángel Di María	Benfica	FW	
September	2010	Brazil	Hulk	Porto	FW	
October	2010	Brazil	Hulk	Porto	FW	
November	2010	Portugal	João Tomás	Rio Ave	FW	
December	2010	Brazil	Hulk	Porto	FW	
January	2011	Brazil	Hulk	Porto	FW	
February	2011	Brazil	Diego	Vitória de Setúbal	GK	
March	2011	Brazil	Diego	Vitória de Setúbal	GK	
April	2011	Portugal	Rui Patrício	Sporting CP	GK	
September	2011	Netherlands	Ricky van Wolfswinkel	Sporting CP	FW	
October	2011	Spain	Diego Capel	Sporting CP	MF	
November	2011	Brazil	Marcelo Toscano	Vitória de Guimarães	FW	
December	2011	France	Bédi Buval	Feirense	FW	
January	2012	Paraguay	Óscar Cardozo	Benfica	FW	
February	2012	Brazil	Lima	Braga	FW	
March	2012	Brazil	Mossoró	Braga	MF	
April	2012	Brazil	Hulk	Porto	FW	
August/September	2012	Colombia	James Rodríguez	Porto	FW	
October/November	2012	Colombia	Jackson Martínez	Porto	FW	
December/January	2012	Serbia	Nemanja Matić	Benfica	MF	
February	2013	Colombia	Jackson Martínez	Porto	FW	
March	2013	Brazil	Lima	Benfica	FW	
April	2013	Serbia	Nemanja Matić	Benfica	MF	
August/September	2013	Colombia	Fredy Montero	Sporting CP	FW	
October/November	2013	Portugal	William Carvalho	Sporting CP	MF	
December	2013	Portugal	William Carvalho	Sporting CP	MF	
January/February	2014	Serbia	Lazar Marković	Benfica	MF	
March	2014	Portugal	William Carvalho	Sporting CP	MF	
April	2014	Brazil	Lima	Benfica	FW	
August/September	2014	Brazil	Talisca	Benfica	FW	
October/November	2014	Portugal	Nani	Sporting CP	MF	
December	2014	Colombia	Jackson Martínez	Porto	FW	
January	2015	Colombia	Jackson Martínez	Porto	FW	
February	2015	Brazil	Jonas	Benfica	FW	
March	2015	Spain	Cristian Tello	Porto	FW	
April	2015	Brazil	Jonas	Benfica	FW	
August/September	2015	Portugal	André André	Porto	MF	
October/November	2015	Portugal	André André	Porto	MF	
December	2015	Algeria	Islam Slimani	Sporting CP	FW	
January	2016	Brazil	Jonas	Benfica	FW	
February	2016	Brazil	Jonas	Benfica	FW	
March	2016	Brazil	Jonas	Benfica	FW	
April	2016	Portugal	João Mário	Sporting CP	MF	

== Statistics ==
=== Awards won by club ===
Club	Wins
Benfica	27
Porto	26
Sporting CP	20
Braga	5
Boavista	3
Marítimo	3
Vitória de Setúbal	3
Rio Ave	3
União de Leiria	2
Leixões	2
Académica de Coimbra	2
Beira-Mar	1
Feirense	1
Nacional	1
Moreirense	1
Paços de Ferreira	1
Vitória de Guimarães	1

=== Awards won by nationality ===
Country	Wins
Portugal	36
Brazil	32
Argentina	6
Colombia	6
Serbia	3
South Africa	3
France	1
Netherlands	2
Paraguay	2
Senegal	2
Spain	2
Algeria	2
Angola	1
Cameroon	1
Liechtenstein	1
Slovakia	1
Uruguay	1

=== Multiple winners ===
Player	Wins
Hulk	6
Jonas	5
Liédson	5
Ricardo Quaresma	4
Jackson Martínez	4
Benni McCarthy	3
Simão	3
Lima	3
William Carvalho	3
Nuno Gomes	2
Lisandro López	2
João Tomás	2
Diego	2
Óscar Cardozo	2
Nemanja Matić	2
André André	2

=== Awards won by position ===
Position	Wins
Forward	62
Midfielder	24
Goalkeeper	9
Defender	7

== SJPF Primeira Liga Team of the Year ==
2016 team

Position	Player	Team
Goalkeeper	(Brazil) Ederson	Benfica
Defenders	(Portugal) Nélson Semedo	Benfica
Defenders	(Sweden) Victor Lindelöf	Benfica
Defenders	(Uruguay) Sebastián Coates	Sporting CP
Defenders	(Brazil) Alex Telles	Porto
Midfielders	(Portugal) Danilo Pereira	Porto
Midfielders	(Portugal) Adrien Silva	Sporting CP
Midfielders	(Portugal) Pizzi	Benfica
Forwards	(Portugal) Gelson Martins	Sporting CP
Forwards	(Brazil) Jonas	Benfica
Forwards	(Greece) Kostas Mitroglou	Benfica

2017 team

Position	Player	Team
Goalkeeper	(Portugal) Rui Patrício	Sporting CP
Defenders	(Portugal) Nélson Semedo	Benfica
Defenders	(Brazil) Felipe	Porto
Defenders	(Uruguay) Sebastián Coates	Sporting CP
Defenders	(Brazil) Alex Telles	Porto
Midfielders	(Portugal) Danilo Pereira	Porto
Midfielders	(Portugal) William Carvalho	Sporting CP
Midfielders	(Portugal) Pizzi	Benfica
Forwards	(Portugal) Gelson Martins	Sporting CP
Forwards	(Brazil) Jonas	Benfica
Forwards	(Algeria) Yacine Brahimi	Porto
