= 2010–11 Sporting CP season =

Sporting CP
2010–11 season
- Chairman: José Eduardo Bettencourt
- Manager: Paulo Sérgio
- Stadium: Estádio José Alvalade
- Primeira Liga: 3rd
- UEFA Europa League: Round of 32
- Taça de Portugal: Fourth round
- Taça da Liga: Semi-final
Home colours	Away colours	Third colours

The 2010–11 Sporting CP season was the club's 77th season in the top-flight Primeira Liga, known as the Liga Zon Sagres for sponsorship purposes. The club also participated in the UEFA Europa League, which it entered in the third qualifying round.

== Players ==
=== Squad information ===
N	Pos.	Nat.	Name	Age	EU	Since	App	Goals	Ends	Transfer fee	Notes
1	GK	(Portugal)	R. Patrício	38	EU	2006	147	0	2013	Youth system	
2	DF	(Argentina)	M. Torsiglieri	38	EU	2010	12	0	2014	€3.4M	Second nationality: Italy
3	DF	(Portugal)	D. Carriço	38	EU	2008	101	5	2013	Youth system	
4	DF	(Brazil)	Â. Polga	47	EU	2003	288	4	2012	Free	Second nationality: Portugal
5	LB	(Portugal)	Evaldo	44	EU	2010	32	1	2014	€3M	Second nationality: Brazil
6	MF	(Portugal)	P. Mendes	47	EU	2010 (Winter)	25	1	2012	€1M	
7	MF	(Russia)	Izmailov	43	Non-EU	2008	106	14	2013	€4.5M	
8	MF	(Portugal)	Maniche	48	EU	2010	26	6	2011	Free	
9	FW	(Portugal)	C. Saleiro	40	EU	2010	57	11	2012	Youth system	
14	MF	(Chile)	Matías	40	Non-EU	2009	62	8	2013	€3.65M	Second nationality: Chile
15	MF	(Chile)	J. Valdés	45	EU	2010	23	5	2013	€2.99M	
16	GK	(Portugal)	Tiago	51	EU	2001	131	0	2011	undisclosed	
18	LB	(Argentina)	L. Grimi	41	EU	2008	85	2	2013	€2.5M	Second nationality: Italy
20	FW	(Portugal)	Yannick	40	EU	2008	143	30	2013	Youth system	Second nationality: Guinea-Bissau
21	MF	(Spain)	Zapater	41	EU	2010	11	0	2015	Involved in M. Veloso's transfer	
23	FW	(Portugal)	H. Postiga	44	EU	2008	96	17	2011	€2.5M	
26	MF	(Portugal)	A. Santos	37	EU	2010	29	1	2014	Youth system	
30	GK	(Germany)	Hildebrand	47	EU	2010	3	0	2011	Free	
31	FW	(Portugal)	Liédson	48	EU	2003	305	169	2012	Free	Second nationality: Brazil
33	FW	(Portugal)	D. Salomão	37	EU	2010	18	3	2014	€0.1M	
41	RB	(Portugal)	C. Soares	34	EU	2010	1	0	?	Youth system	Second nationality: Germany
44	DF	(Portugal)	N. Coelho	40	EU	2010	15	1	2014	Involved in J. Moutinho's transfer	
47	RB	(Portugal)	J. Pereira	42	EU	2010 (Winter)	47	3	2014	€3M	
55	MF	(Brazil)	Tales	36	EU	2010	0	0	2011	Loan	
77	MF	(Montenegro)	Simon	40	EU	2007	124	26	2013	€2M	
78	RB	(Portugal)	Abel	47	EU	2006	177	4	2011	€0.75M	

- Last updated: 8 December 2010
- Source: Sporting.pt,

=== Players in / out ===
==== In ====
No.	Pos.	Nat.	Name	Age	EU	Moving from	Type	Transfer window	Ends	Transfer fee	Source
32	GK	(Brazil)	Golas	35	Non-EU	Real	Loan return	Summer	2013	n/a	
34	GK	(Serbia)	Stojković	43	EU	Wigan Athletic (England)	Loan return	Summer	2012	n/a	
2	DF	(Argentina)	M. Torsiglieri	38	EU	Vélez Sarsfield (Argentina)	Transfer	Summer	2014	€3.4M	CMVM.pt
44	DF	(Portugal)	N. Coelho	40	EU	Porto	Transfer	Summer	2014	€1M + involved in J. Moutinho's transfer	CMVM.pt
5	LB	(Portugal)	Evaldo	44	EU	Braga	Transfer	Summer	2014	€3M	CMVM.pt
26	MF	(Portugal)	A. Santos	37	EU	União de Leiria	Loan return	Summer	2014	n/a	Sporting.pt
30	MF	(Portugal)	A. Martins	36	EU	Real	Loan return	Summer	2012	n/a	Sporting.pt
8	MF	(Portugal)	Maniche	48	EU	1. FC Köln (Germany)	Transfer	Summer	2011	Free	Sporting.pt
33	FW	(Portugal)	D. Salomão	37	EU	Real	Transfer	Summer	2014	€0.1M	Sporting.pt
15	MF	(Chile)	J. Valdés	45	EU	Atalanta (Italy)	Transfer	Summer	2013	€2.99M	CMVM.pt
21	MF	(Spain)	Zapater	41	EU	Genoa (Italy)	Transfer	Summer	2015	€2M + involved in Miguel Veloso's transfer	CMVM.pt
41	RB	(Portugal)	C. Soares	34	EU	Youth system	Transfer	Summer	?	n/a	
30	GK	(Germany)	Hildebrand	47	EU	Free Agent	Transfer	Summer	2010	Free	Sporting.pt
55	MF	(Brazil)	Tales	36	Non-EU	Internacional (Brazil)	Transfer	Summer	2010	Loan	Sporting.pt

Total spending: ▼€12.49 million.

==== Out ====
No.	Pos.	Nat.	Name	Age	EU	Moving to	Type	Transfer window	Transfer fee	Source
—	LB	(Brazil)	Ronny	40	Non-EU	Hertha BSC (Germany)	Contract ended	Summer	n/a	RTP.pt
—	DF	(Portugal)	Tonel	46	EU	Dinamo Zagreb (Croatia)	Transfer	Summer	Undisclosed	Sporting.pt
—	MF	(Portugal)	J. Moutinho	39	EU	Porto	Transfer	Summer	€11M + N. Coelho	CMVM.pt
—	MF	(Portugal)	D. Amado	36	EU	União de Leiria	Contract ended	Summer	n/a	Maisfutebol.iol.pt
—	MF	(Portugal)	M. Veloso	40	EU	Genoa (Italy)	Transfer	Summer	€9M + Zapater	CMVM.pt
—	MF	(Portugal)	Fábio Paím	38	EU	Torreense	Contract ended	Summer	n/a	
—	MF	(Nigeria)	Rabiu Ibrahim	35	Non-EU	Free agent	Contract ended	Summer	n/a	
—	FW	(Portugal)	M. Matias	37	EU	Vitória de Guimarães	Contract ended	Summer	n/a	
—	GK	(Portugal)	R. Batista	39	EU	Olhanense	Loan	Summer	Loan	Sporting.pt
—	GK	(Serbia)	Stojković	43	EU	Partizan (Serbia)	Loan	Summer	Loan	Sporting.pt
—	GK	(Brazil)	V. Golas	35	Non-EU	Boavista	Loan	Summer	Loan	Sporting.pt
—	RB	(Portugal)	J. Gonçalves	38	EU	Olhanense	Loan	Summer	Loan	
—	RB	(Brazil)	Pedro Silva	45	Non-EU	Portimonense	Loan	Summer	Loan	Sporting.pt
—	DF	(Portugal)	N. Reis	35	EU	Cercle Brugge (Belgium)	Loan	Summer	Loan	Sporting.pt
—	DF	(Portugal)	P. Mendes	35	EU	Servette (Switzerland)	Loan	Summer	Loan	Sporting.pt
—	DF	(Mozambique)	Mexer	38	EU	Olhanense	Loan	Summer	Loan	Sporting.pt
—	LB	(Portugal)	A. Marques	39	EU	Beira-Mar	Loan	Summer	Loan	Beiramar.pt
—	MF	(Portugal)	A. Silva	37	EU	Maccabi Haifa (Israel)	Loan	Summer	Loan	Sporting.pt
—	MF	(Portugal)	B. Pereirinha	38	EU	Vitória de Guimarães	Loan	Summer	Loan	Sporting.pt
—	MF	(Brazil)	R. Neto	34	Non-EU	Cercle Brugge (Belgium)	Loan	Summer	Loan	Sporting.pt
—	MF	(Brazil)	Celsinho	37	Non-EU	Portuguesa (Brazil)	Loan	Summer	Loan	Sporting.pt
—	MF	(Portugal)	A. Martins	38	EU	Belenenses	Loan	Summer	Loan	Sporting.pt
—	MF	(United States)	G. Garza	35	Non-EU	Estoril Praia	Loan	Summer	Loan	
—	MF	(Portugal)	D. Rosado	36	EU	Penafiel	Loan	Summer	Loan	Sporting.pt
—	FW	(Portugal)	W. Eduardo	36	EU	Beira-Mar	Loan	Summer	Loan	Beiramar.pt
—	FW	(Portugal)	R. Fonte	36	EU	Espanyol (Spain)	Loan	Summer	Loan	Sporting.pt
—	FW	(Portugal)	A. Baldé	35	EU	Santa Clara	Loan	Summer	Loan	Sporting.pt
—	FW	(Ghana)	W. Owusu	36	Non-EU	Cercle Brugge (Belgium)	Loan	Summer	Loan	Sporting.pt
—	FW	(Montenegro)	Purović	41	Non-EU	Belenenses	Loan	Summer	Loan	Sporting.pt
—	FW	(France)	Sinama P.	41	EU	Zaragoza (Spain)	Loan	Summer	Loan	Sporting.pt

Total income: ▲€20 million.

== Player statistics ==
=== Squad stats ===
				Total				Primeira Liga		UEFA Europa League		Taça de Portugal		Taça da Liga		Others^{1}		
N	Pos.	Name	Nat.	GS	App	Gls	Min	App	Gls	App	Gls	App	Gls	App	Gls	App	Gls	Notes
1	GK	R. Patrício	(Portugal)	24	27	-22	2143	13	-13	6	-3	1				7	-6	(−) means goals conceded
16	GK	Tiago	(Portugal)	3	7	-2	302			1	-1					6	-1	(−) means goals conceded
30	GK	Hildebrand	(Germany)	3	3	-5	270			2	-4	1	-1					(−) means goals conceded
2	DF	M. Torsiglieri	(Argentina)	9	13		851	4		3						6		
3	DF	D. Carriço	(Portugal)	27	29	3	2473	13		8	1	2				6	2	
4	DF	Â. Polga	(Brazil)	18	21	1	1642	6		6	1	2				7		
5	DF	Evaldo	(Portugal)	27	33	1	2584	13		9	1	2				9		
18	DF	L. Grimi	(Argentina)	6	8		396									8		
41	DF	C. Soares	(Portugal)	1	1		59			1								
44	DF	N. Coelho	(Portugal)	12	17	1	1120	7		4	1					6		
47	DF	J. Pereira	(Portugal)	23	31	1	2187	12	1	8		2				9		
78	DF	Abel	(Portugal)	15	20	1	1263	7	1	5		1				7		
6	MF	P. Mendes	(Portugal)	8	10		620	3		2		1				4		
7	MF	Izmailov	(Russia)		1		45									1		Source
8	MF	Maniche	(Portugal)	23	27	6	2121	11	1	7	3					9	2	
14	MF	Matías	(Chile)	10	16	4	849	8	2	4	1	1				3	1	
15	MF	J. Valdés	(Chile)	15	24	5	1292	10	4	6		2				6	1	
21	MF	Zapater	(Spain)	8	12		711	6		5		1						
26	MF	A. Santos	(Portugal)	25	30	1	2298	11	1	8		2				9		
55	MF	Tales	(Brazil)															
77	MF	Simon	(Montenegro)	18	28	4	1537	11	2	8	2	2				7		
9	FW	C. Saleiro	(Portugal)	9	28	6	865	12	1	6	1	1				9	4	
20	FW	Yannick	(Portugal)	14	26	6	1408	9	1	6	1	1	1			10	3	
23	FW	H. Postiga	(Portugal)	23	31	11	2098	11	2	9	4	2	1			9	4	
31	FW	Liédson	(Portugal)	16	20	4	1418	9	1	6	2	2	1			3		
33	FW	D. Salomão	(Portugal)	10	18	3	1056	3		4	2	2				9	1	

Last updated: 8 December 2010
Source: Sporting.pt
Ordered by position
0 shown as blank

^{1} Other Competitions: Pre-season and friendlies

=== Disciplinary records ===
N	Pos.	Nat.	Name	Yellow card	Second yellow card	Red card	Notes
1	GK	(Portugal)	R. Patrício	2			
16	GK	(Portugal)	Tiago				
30	GK	(Germany)	Hildebrand				
2	DF	(Argentina)	M. Torsiglieri	1			
3	DF	(Portugal)	D. Carriço	6			
4	DF	(Brazil)	Â. Polga	2			
5	DF	(Portugal)	Evaldo	5			
18	DF	(Argentina)	L. Grimi				
41	DF	(Portugal)	C. Soares				
44	DF	(Portugal)	N. Coelho				
47	DF	(Portugal)	J. Pereira	6			
78	DF	(Portugal)	Abel	2	1		
6	MF	(Portugal)	P. Mendes	1			
7	MF	(Russia)	Izmailov				
8	MF	(Portugal)	Maniche	4		2	Punished for responding to aggression
14	MF	(Chile)	Matías	1			
15	MF	(Chile)	J. Valdés	3			
21	MF	(Spain)	Zapater				
26	MF	(Portugal)	A. Santos	3			
55	MF	(Brazil)	Tales				
77	MF	(Montenegro)	Simon	2			
9	FW	(Portugal)	C. Saleiro	3			
20	FW	(Portugal)	Yannick	1			
23	FW	(Portugal)	H. Postiga	5			
31	FW	(Portugal)	Liédson	2			
33	FW	(Portugal)	D. Salomão				

Last updated: 8 December 2010
Source: Competitive matches
Only competitive matches
(yellow card) = Number of bookings; (second yellow card) = Number of sending offs after a second yellow card; (red card) = Number of sending offs by a direct red card.

=== Starting players ===
No.	Pos.	Nat.	Name	MS	Notes
11 starters
1	GK	(Portugal)	R. Patrício	4	
47	RB	(Portugal)	J. Pereira	4	
3	CB	(Portugal)	D. Carriço	4	
4	CB	(Portugal)	N. Coelho	3	
5	LB	(Portugal)	Evaldo	4	
26	CM	(Portugal)	A. Santos	2	
8	CM	(Portugal)	Maniche	4	
77	CM	(Montenegro)	Simon	2	
15	CM	(Chile)	J. Valdés	4	
23	FW	(Portugal)	Yannick	4	
31	FW	(Portugal)	Liédson	4	
Other starters
20	CB	(Portugal)	N. Coelho	2	
6	CM	(Portugal)	P. Mendes	1	
14	AM	(Chile)	Matías	3	
9	FW	(Portugal)	C. Saleiro	1	
20	FW	(Portugal)	H. Postiga	2	

Last updated: 14 August 2010
Source: Squad stats and Start formations.
Only competitive matches.
Using the most used start formation.
Ordered by position on pitch (from back right to front left).

== Club ==
=== Current technical staff ===
Position	Staff
Head Coach First Team	(Portugal) José Couceiro
Assistant Coach	(Portugal) Oceano da Cruz
Assistant Coach	(Portugal) Sérgio Cruz
Assistant Coach	(Portugal) Alberto Cabral
Goalkeeping Coach	(Portugal) Vítor Silvestre
Physical fitness coach	(Portugal) José Herculano
Director of Football	(Portugal) José Couceiro

Last updated: 21 June
Source: sporting.pt

== Competitions ==
=== Overview ===
Competition	Started round	Current position / round	Final position / round	First match	Last match
Primeira Liga	—	3rd		15 August 2010	15 May 2011
UEFA Europa League	Third qualifying round	Group stage		29 July 2010	
Taça de Portugal	Third qualifying round	Round of 32		16 October 2010	
Taça da Liga	Third qualifying round	—		3 January 2011	

Updated to match played 7 December 2010
Source: Competitions

=== Primeira Liga ===
==== League table ====
Pos	Team	Pld	W	D	L	GF	GA	GD	Pts	Qualification or relegation
1	Porto (C)	30	27	3	0	73	16	+57	84	Qualification to Champions League group stage
2	Benfica	30	20	3	7	61	31	+30	63	Qualification to Champions League third qualifying round
3	Sporting CP	30	13	9	8	41	31	+10	48	Qualification to Europa League play-off round
4	Braga	30	13	7	10	45	33	+12	46	Qualification to Europa League play-off round
5	Vitória de Guimarães	30	12	7	11	36	37	−1	43	Qualification to Europa League third qualifying round

Source: LPFP (in Portuguese)
Rules for classification: 1) Points; 2) Head-to-head points; 3) Head-to-head goal difference; 4) Head-to-head away goals scored; 5) Goal difference; 6) Matches won; 7) Goals scored; 8) Play-off.
(Note: LPFP decided that only criteria 1, 5, 6 and 7 would be applied to establish the classification during the competition.)
(C) Champions

==== Results summary ====
Overall								Home						Away					
Pld	W	D	L	GF	GA	GD	Pts	W	D	L	GF	GA	GD	W	D	L	GF	GA	GD
13	6	4	3	17	13	+4	22	2	3	1	6	5	+1	4	1	2	11	8	+3

Last updated: 7 December 2010.
Source: Competitive Matches

==== Results by round ====
Round	1	2	3	4	5	6	7	8	9	10	11	12	13	14	15	16	17	18	19	20	21	22	23	24	25	26	27	28	29	30
Ground	A	H	A	H	A	H	A	H	A	H	A	H	A	A	H	H	A	H	A	H	A	H	A	H	A	H	A	H	H	A
Result	L	W	W	D	L	D	D	W	W	L	W	D	W																	
Position	12	7	3	5	7	8	10	7	3	6	4	4	3																	

Updated to match(es) played on 7 December 2010. Source: Competitive Matches
A = Away; H = Home; W = Win; D = Draw; L = Loss

=== UEFA Europa League ===
==== Third qualifying round ====
Team 1	Agg.	Team 2	1st leg	2nd leg
Nordsjælland (Denmark)	1–3	(Portugal) Sporting CP	0–1	1–2

==== Play-off round ====
Team 1	Agg.	Team 2	1st leg	2nd leg
Sporting CP (Portugal)	3–2	(Denmark) Brøndby	0–2	3–0

==== Group stage ====
===== Group C =====
Pos	Team	Pld	W	D	L	GF	GA	GD	Pts	Qualification	SCP	LIL	GNT	LS
1	(Portugal) Sporting CP	6	4	0	2	14	6	+8	12	Advance to knockout phase	—	1–0	5–1	5–0
2	(France) Lille	6	2	2	2	8	6	+2	8	Advance to knockout phase	1–2	—	3–0	1–0
3	(Belgium) Gent	6	2	1	3	8	13	−5	7		3–1	1–1	—	1–0
4	(Bulgaria) Levski Sofia	6	2	1	3	6	11	−5	7		1–0	2–2	3–2	—

Source: Soccerway

==== Last 32 ====
Team 1	Agg.	Team 2	1st leg	2nd leg
Rangers (Scotland)	3(a)- 3	(Portugal) Sporting CP	1–1	2–2

===== Results by round =====
Round	1	2	3	4	5	6
Ground	A	H	H	A	H	A
Result	W	W	W	L	W	
Position	2	1	1	1	1	1

Updated to match(es) played on 1 December 2010. Source: Competitive Matches
A = Away; H = Home; W = Win; D = Draw; L = Loss

=== Taça de Portugal ===
==== Third qualifying round ====
Team 1	Score	Team 2
Estoril Praia (II)	1–2	Sporting CP

==== Fourth qualifying round ====
Team 1	Score	Team 2
Sporting CP	1–0	Paços de Ferreira

==== Fifth qualifying round ====
Team 1	Score	Team 2
Vitória de Setúbal	2–1	Sporting CP

Last updated: 1 December 2010.
Source: Competitive Matches

=== Portuguese League Cup ===
==== Third round ====
Group D

Pos	Team	Pld	W	D	L	GF	GA	GD	Pts	Qualification	SCP	ESP	NAV	PEN
1	Sporting CP	3	2	0	1	7	2	+5	6	Advance to knockout phase			2–0	4–0
2	Estoril	3	1	1	1	4	4	0	4		2–1			0–1
3	Naval	3	1	1	1	3	4	−1	4			2–2		
4	Penafiel	3	1	0	2	1	5	−4	3				0–1	

=== Competitive ===
==== Portuguese Liga ====
Kickoff times are in UTC.

Win Draw Loss

14 August 2010 Round 1	Paços de Ferreira	1–0	Sporting CP	Estádio da Mata Real, Paços de Ferreira
21:15	Rondón 59'	(Report)		Attendance: 4,845; Referee: Artur Soares Dias (Porto)

22 August 2010 Round 2	Sporting CP	1–0	Marítimo	Estádio José Alvalade, Lisbon
18:00	Fernández 88' (pen.)	(Report)		Attendance: 20,828; Referee: Bruno Paixão (Setúbal)

30 August 2010 Round 3	Naval 1º de Maio	1–3	Sporting CP	Estádio Municipal José Bento Pessoa, Figueira da Foz
20:15	João Pedro 74'	(Report)	Liédson 40'; Fernández 59' (pen.); Djaló 69'	Attendance: 5,201; Referee: Elmano Santos (Madeira)

11 September 2010 Round 4	Sporting CP	0–0	Olhanense	Estádio José Alvalade, Lisbon
19:15		(Report)		Attendance: 25,807; Referee: André Gralha (Santarém)

19 September 2010 Round 5	Benfica	2–0	Sporting CP	Estádio da Luz, Lisbon
20:15	Cardozo 13', 50'	(Report)		Attendance: 51,899; Referee: Carlos Xistra (Castelo Branco)

26 September 2010 Round 6	Sporting CP	1–1	Nacional	Estádio José Alvalade, Lisbon
20:15	Saleiro 63'	(Report)	Danielson 79'	Attendance: 23,372; Referee: Rui Costa (Porto)

3 October 2010 Round 7	Beira-Mar	1–1	Sporting CP	Estádio Municipal de Aveiro, Aveiro
19:15	Renan 38'	(Report)	Pereira 40'	Attendance: 13,391; Referee: Paulo Baptista (Portalegre)

24 October 2010 Round 8	Sporting CP	1–0	Rio Ave	Estádio José Alvalade, Lisbon
18:15	Abel 89'	(Report)		Attendance: 27,000; Referee: Olegário Benquerença (Leiria)

31 October 2010 Round 9	União de Leiria	1–2	Sporting CP	Estádio Dr. Magalhães Pessoa, Leiria
20:15	Carlão 22'	(Report)	Valdés 14', 41'	Attendance: 4,870; Referee: João Ferreira (Setúbal)

7 November 2010 Round 10	Sporting CP	2–3	Vitória de Guimarães	Estádio José Alvalade, Lisbon
19:45	Postiga 13'; Vukčević 29'	(Report)	Targino 77', 78'; Teles 88'	Attendance: 20,093; Referee: Elmano Santos (Madeira)

14 November 2010 Round 11	Académica de Coimbra	1–2	Sporting CP	Estádio Cidade de Coimbra, Coimbra
21:15	Valdés 9'; Vukčević 32'	(Report)	Fidalgo 47'	Attendance: 6,069; Referee: Artur Soares Dias (Porto)

28 November 2010 Round 12	Sporting CP	1–1	Porto	Estádio José Alvalade, Lisbon
21:15	Valdés 37'	(Report)	Falcao 57'	Attendance: 35,063; Referee: Jorge Sousa (Porto)

5 December 2010 Round 13	Portimonense	1–3	Sporting CP	Estádio Municipal de Portimão, Portimão
20:15	Pires 37'	(Report)	Postiga 22'; Maniche 43'; Santos 46'	Attendance: 4,585; Referee: Rui Costa (Porto)

20 December 2010 Round 14	Vitória de Setúbal	0–3	Sporting CP	Estádio do Bonfim, Setúbal
19:45		(Report)	Djaló 20', 57'; Abel 39'	Attendance: 1,849; Referee: João Capela (Porto)

8 January 2011 Round 15	Sporting CP	2–1	Braga	Estádio José Alvalade, Lisbon
21:15	Salomão 11'; Valdés 13'	(Report)	Paulo César 17'	Attendance: 22,314; Referee: Bruno Paixão (Setúbal)

16 January 2011 Round 16	Sporting CP	2–3	Paços de Ferreira	Estádio José Alvalade, Lisbon
21h15	Liédson 42'; Salomão 63'	(Report)	Samuel 28'; Manuel José 45'; Pizzi 81'	Attendance: 17,643; Referee: Luís Catita (Évora)

23 January 2011 Round 17	Marítimo	0–3	Sporting CP	Estádio dos Barreiros, Funchal
		(Report)

6 February 2011 Round 18	Sporting CP	3–3	Naval 1º de Maio	Estádio José Alvalade, Lisbon
		(Report)		Referee: Bruno Esteves

13 February 2011 Round 19	Olhanense	2–2	Sporting CP	Estádio José Arcanjo, Olhão
		(Report)		Referee: Olegário Benquerença

20 February 2011 Round 20	Sporting CP	0–2	Benfica	Estádio José Alvalade, Lisbon
		(Report)		Referee: Artur Soares Dias

27 February 2011 Round 21	Nacional	1–0	Sporting CP	Estádio da Madeira, Funchal
		(Report)		Referee: Carlos Xistra

6 March 2011 Round 22	Sporting CP	1–0	Beira-Mar	Estádio José Alvalade, Lisbon
		(Report)		Referee: Hugo Pacheco

13 March 2011 Round 23	Rio Ave	0–0	Sporting CP	Estádio do Rio Ave FC, Vila do Conde
		(Report)

20 March 2011 Round 24	Sporting CP	0–0	União de Leiria	Estádio José Alvalade, Lisbon
		(Report)

3 April 2011 Round 25	Vitória de Guimarães	1–1	Sporting CP	Estádio D. Afonso Henriques, Guimarães
		(Report)

10 April 2011 Round 26	Sporting CP	2–0	Académica de Coimbra	Estádio José Alvalade, Lisbon
		(Report)		Referee: Hugo Miguel

17 April 2011 Round 27	Porto	3–2	Sporting CP	Estádio do Dragão, Porto
		(Report)		Referee: Artur Soares Dias

1 May 2011 Round 28	Sporting CP	2–1	Portimonense	Estádio José Alvalade, Lisbon
		(Report)		Referee: Duarte Gomes

8 May 2011 Round 29	Sporting CP	3–0	Vitória de Setúbal	Estádio José Alvalade, Lisbon
		(Report)

15 May 2011 Round 30	Braga	0–1	Sporting CP	Estádio Municipal de Braga, Braga
		(Report)		Referee: Pedro Proença

Last updated: 1 December 2010.
Source: LPFP.pt

==== UEFA Europa League ====
Kickoff times are in CET.

Win Draw Loss

===== Third qualifying round =====
29 July 2010 First leg	Nordsjælland (Denmark)	0–1	Sporting CP	Farum Park, Farum, Denmark
20:30		Report	Vukčević 24'	Referee: Stanislav Sukhina (Russia)

5 August 2010 Second leg	Sporting CP	2–1 (3–1 agg.)	(Denmark) Nordsjælland	Estádio José Alvalade, Lisbon
20:45	Postiga 24'; Maniche 90+2'	Report	Lawan 79'	Attendance: 27,000; Referee: Marijo Strahonja (Croatia)

===== Play-off round =====
19 August 2010 First leg	Sporting CP	0–2	(Denmark) Brøndby	Estádio José Alvalade, Lisbon
21:30		Report	Kristiansen 43'; Jallow 52'	Attendance: 20,057; Referee: Robert Schörgenhofer (Austria)

26 August 2010 Second leg	Brøndby (Denmark)	0–3 (2–3 agg.)	Sporting CP	Brøndby Stadium, Brøndby, Denmark
19:00		Report	Evaldo 45+1'; Coelho 75'; Djaló 90+1'	Referee: Jiri Jech (Czech Republic)

===== Group stage =====
16 September 2010 1	Lille (France)	1–2	Sporting CP	Stadium Nord Lille Métropole, Villeneuve-d'Ascq, France
19:00	Frau 57'	Report	Vukčević 11'; Postiga 34'	Attendance: 25,000; Referee: Martin Atkinson (England)

30 September 2010 2	Sporting CP	5–0	(Bulgaria) Levski Sofia	Estádio José Alvalade, Lisbon
21:05	Carriço 30'; Maniche 43'; Salomão 53'; Postiga 61'; Fernández 79'	Report		Attendance: 15,081; Referee: Sascha Kever (Switzerland)

21 October 2010 3	Sporting CP	5–1	(Belgium) Gent	Estádio José Alvalade, Lisbon
21:05	Salomão 6'; Liédson 13', 27'; Maniche 37'; Postiga 60'	Report	Wils 16'	Attendance: 15,008; Referee: Alan Kelly (Republic of Ireland)

4 November 2010 4	Gent (Belgium)	3–1	Sporting CP	Jules Ottenstadion, Ghent, Belgium
19:00	Smolders 7' (pen.); Conte 79'; Arbeitman 82'	Report	Saleiro 38'	Attendance: 8,795; Referee: Peter Rasmussen (Denmark)

1 December 2010 5	Sporting CP	1–0	(France) Lille	Estádio José Alvalade, Lisbon
21:05	Polga 28'	Report		Attendance: 16569; Referee: Bas Nijhuis (Netherlands)

16 December 2010 6	Levski Sofia (Bulgaria)	1–0	Sporting CP	Georgi Asparuhov Stadium, Sofia, Bulgaria
19:00	Mladenov 45'	Report		Attendance: 5000; Referee: Thorsten Kinhöfer (Germany)

Last updated: 1 December 2010.
Source: UEFA.com

==== Taça de Portugal ====
Kickoff times are in UTC.

Win Loss

===== Third qualifying round =====
16 October 2010 Third round	Estoril Praia	1–2	Sporting CP	Estádio António Coimbra da Mota, Estoril
17:00	Afonso 35'	Report	Liédson 64'; Postiga 79'	Referee: Pedro Proença (Lisbon)

===== Fourth qualifying round =====
21 November 2010 Fourth round	Sporting CP	1–0	Paços de Ferreira	Estádio José Alvalade, Lisbon
20:15	Djaló 45'	Report		Referee: Bruno Paixão (Setúbal)

===== Fifth qualifying round =====
11 December 2010 Fifth round	Vitória de Setúbal	2–1	Sporting CP	Estádio do Bonfim, Setúbal
20:15	Santos 29'; Zeca 34'	[ Report]	Liédson 76'	Referee: Olegário Benquerença

Last updated: 1 December 2010.
Source: FPF.pt

=== Taça da Liga ===
Kickoff times are in UTC.

Win Draw Loss

==== Third qualifying round ====
3 January 2011 Round 1	Sporting CP	2–0	Naval 1º de Maio	Estádio José Alvalade, Lisbon
19:15	Vukčević 69'; Liédson 72'	Report		Attendance: 11,243; Referee: Hugo Miguel (Lisbon)

20 January 2011 Round 2	Sporting CP	4–0	Penafiel	Estádio José Alvalade, Lisbon
20h15	Pereira 45+3'; Valdés 71'; Zapater 83', 90+1'	Report		Attendance: 9.489; Referee: Duarte Gomes (Lisbon)

29 January 2011 Round 3	Estoril	v	Sporting CP	Estádio António Coimbra da Mota, Estoril
		Report

Last updated: 4 December 2010.
Source: LPFP.pt

== Pre-season ==
Game	Date	Tournament	Round	Ground	Opponent	Score^{1}	Report
1	26 June	–	Friendly	N	1º de Maio Sarilhense (Portugal)	10–0	Report / Report link; Kick off / 09:00 UTC; Referee / Arlindo Santos (Portugal); Sporting CP / 1º de Maio Sarilhense; Moutinho; Saleiro; Eduardo; Owusu; Maniche; Sinama Pongolle; Carriço
2	2 July	–	Friendly	N	Mafra (Portugal)	2–2	Report / Report link; Kick off / 10:00 UTC; Referee / Miguel Soares (Portugal); Sporting CP / Mafra; Postiga / Kifuta; Samuel
3	3 July	–	Friendly	N	1º de Maio Sarilhense (Portugal)	5–1	Report / Report link; Kick off / 09:00 UTC; Referee / Bruno Cunha (Portugal); Sporting CP / 1º de Maio Sarilhense; Eduardo; Postiga; Saleiro; Salomão; Owusu / Nivaldo
4	9 July	–	Friendly	N (Switzerland)	Young Boys (Switzerland)	1–0	Report / Report link; Kick off / 19:30 CET; Referee / Patrick Graf (Switzerland); Sporting CP / Young Boys; Saleiro 27'
5	11 July	–	Friendly	N (France)	Nice (France)	1–1	Report / Report link; Kick off / 16:30 CET; Referee / Olivier Thual (France); Sporting CP / Nice; Sinama Pongolle 74' (pen.) / 14' (pen.) Rémy
6	14 July	–	Friendly	N (France)	Paris Saint-Germain (France)	2–4	Report / Report link; Kick off / 19:00 CET; Referee / Wilfried Bien (France); Sporting CP / Paris Saint-Germain; Edel 1' (o.g.); Carriço 4' / 20' Erdinç; 23' Giuly; 57' Sessègnon; 65' Maurice
7	18 July	–	Friendly	H (Portugal)	Lyon (France)	2–0	Report / Report link; Kick off / 20:00 UTC; Referee / João Capela (Portugal); Sporting CP / Lyon; Tonel 2'; Djaló 71'
8	21 July	Fenway Football Challenge	Friendly	N (United States)	Celtic (Scotland)	1–1 (5–6 pen.)	Report / Report link; Kick off / 20:00 EST; Attendance / 32,162; Referee / Michael Kennedy (United States); Sporting CP / Celtic; Postiga 81' / 72' (pen.) Samaras
9	23 July	Barclays New York Challenge	Day 2	N (United States)	Manchester City (England)	2–0	Report / Report link; Kick off / 20:00 EST; Referee / Kevin Scott (United States); Sporting CP / Manchester City; Djaló 22', 39'
10	25 July	Barclays New York Challenge	Day 3	N (United States)	Tottenham Hotspur (England)	2–2	Report / Report link; Kick off / 13:00 EST; Referee / Steven DePiero (Canada); Sporting CP / Tottenham Hotspur; Fernández 25'; Valdés 48' / Keane 24'; Obika 70'

Last updated: 27 July 2010
Source: sporting.pt
^{1}Sporting CP goals come first.
National flags for Ground and Opponent columns are only shown when different from that of Sporting CP.
M = Match; Ground: H = Home, A = Away, N = Neutral, HR = Home replacement, AR = Away replacement.
