= Wender =

Wender is both a surname and a given name. Notable people with the given name include:

Given name

- Wender Coelho da Silva (born 1982), commonly known as Teco, Brazilian footballer
- Wenderson Arruda Said (born 1975), commonly known as Wender, retired Brazilian footballer, currently manager

Surname

- Jack Wender (born 1954), former American football running back
- Johann Friedrich Wender (1655–1729), German organ builder
- Louis Wender (c. 1890–1966), psychologist and psychiatrist, known for being a pioneer in group therapy.
- Paul Anthony Wender (born 1947), American chemist
- Paul H. Wender (1934–2016), biochemist and psychiatrist known for researching the genetic linkage in schizophrenia and ADHD.

Stage name

- DJ Wender (born 1973), real name Vincenzo Giannatempo, better known as Wender or Mago Wender, Italian DJ

== See also ==
- Wender., taxonomic author abbreviation for Georg Wilhelm Franz Wenderoth (1774–1861), German pharmacist and botanist
- Wender Taxol total synthesis, named after American chemist Paul Anthony Wender
