= Paul Wender =

Paul Wender may refer to:

- Paul Anthony Wender (born 1947), American chemist whose work is focused on organic chemistry, organometallic chemistry, synthesis, catalysis, chemical biology, imaging, drug delivery, and molecular therapeutics
- Paul H. Wender (1934–2016), also known as Dean of ADHD, a biochemist and psychiatrist known for researching the genetic linkage in schizophrenia and ADHD.
