= Gumbe =

Musical genre

Gumbé
- Stylistic origins: Zouk, Bissau Guinean music
- Cultural origins: Late 1980s, Guinea-Bissau

Gumbé, also goombay or gumbay, is a West African style of music found in countries such as Sierra Leone and Guinea-Bissau. Sierra Leonean gumbé music is indigenous to the Sierra Leone Krio people and was derived from the Jamaican Maroon ancestors of the Krio people. Krio musicians such as Ebenezer Calendar and Dr Oloh popularized gumbé music in Sierra Leone and in other West African locales.

== Etymology ==
It is likely that the etymology of African-American musical genres goombay of the Bahamas originates in Guinea-Bissau gumbé. Gombey music from Bermuda and the Jamaican square maroon drum called goombay could also be related.

== Origins ==
Gumbé is a specific genre, mostly influenced by the fast tempo zouk style called "zouk béton" (music of the French Caribbean popularized by Kassav in the 1980s); though the same term also refers to any music of the country. True gumbe is a fusion of several Bissau Guinean folk traditions. Gumbe is the genre most closely associated with Bissau Guinean music worldwide.

Gumbé is a primarily vocal and percussive music that has been associated with nationalist thought since colonial times.

== See also ==
- Gumbe (drum)
