= Diogo Salomão =

Portuguese footballer (born 1988)

Personal information
- Full name: Diogo Ferreira Salomão
- Date of birth: 14 September 1988 (age 38)
- Place of birth: Amadora, Portugal
- Height: 1.74 m (5 ft 9 in)
- Position: Winger

Youth career
- 1997–2001: Estrela Amadora
- 2001–2004: Damaiense
- 2004–2006: Estrela Amadora
- 2006–2007: Casa Pia

Senior career*
Years	Team	Apps	(Gls)
2007–2009	Casa Pia	14	(6)
2009–2010	Real Massamá	26	(4)
2010–2016	Sporting CP	15	(2)
2011–2013	→ Deportivo La Coruña (loan)	43	(6)
2013–2016	Sporting CP B	19	(0)
2014–2015	→ Deportivo La Coruña (loan)	12	(2)
2016–2017	Mallorca	34	(0)
2017–2019	Dinamo București	55	(15)
2019	Al-Hazem	11	(2)
2019–2020	FCSB	3	(0)
2020–2021	Santa Clara	27	(0)
2021–2023	Estrela Amadora	51	(2)
2023–2024	Alverca	9	(1)
Total		319	(40)

International career
2010	Portugal U21	1	(0)
2011	Portugal U23	1	(1)
- * Club domestic league appearances and goals

Diogo Ferreira Salomão (born 14 September 1988) is a Portuguese former professional footballer who played as a winger.

== Club career ==
Born in Amadora, Lisbon District, Salomão played for three teams as a youth, including two spells at local C.F. Estrela da Amadora. In 2007 he made his senior debut, helping another club from the region, Casa Pia AC, promote from the regional leagues to the fourth division in his first season.

In the 2009–10 campaign, Salomão started in all but one of the league games he appeared in for Real SC, helping the side to the 12th position in the third tier. He subsequently moved straight into the Primeira Liga, as he signed a four-year contract with Sporting CP.

Salomão made his debut in the top flight on 26 September 2010, playing 45 minutes in a 1–1 home draw against C.D. Nacional. He finished his first season with the Lions with 23 official matches – four goals, including two in the UEFA Europa League group stage against PFC Levski Sofia (5–0 home win) and K.A.A. Gent (5–1, also at home)– and, although not a regular starter for the club, showed glimpses of his talent, being compared by many to Portugal international Nani.

On 28 June 2011, deemed surplus to requirements by new Sporting boss Domingos Paciência as several Portuguese players, Salomão was loaned to Deportivo de La Coruña in Spain, in a season-long move. He contributed four goals in his 16 starts and 1,475 minutes of action, as the Galicians returned to La Liga after only one year.

Salomão was again loaned to Depor in 2012–13, being joined in the team by Sporting teammate André Santos. He made his debut in the top division on 20 October 2012, playing 11 minutes in a 4–5 home loss to FC Barcelona.

Salomão returned to Sporting in summer 2013, being assigned to the reserves in the Segunda Liga. On 18 January 2014, he returned to Deportivo again in a temporary deal; after achieving another top-flight promotion, he extended his stay for another year on 23 July.

On 23 May 2015, in only his sixth league appearance of the season, Salomão helped his team come from behind by scoring in the 76th minute of a 2–2 draw at Barcelona in the last round that prevented relegation. He left Sporting in late January 2016, to sign with Segunda División club RCD Mallorca.

On 27 June 2017, Salomão joined Liga I's FC Dinamo București. On 2 February 2019, after 62 competitive games, he left Romania, moving the same day to Al-Hazem F.C. of the Saudi Professional League at the request of Romanian coach Daniel Isăilă.

Salomão returned to the Romanian top tier on 16 July 2019, signing a contract with FCSB. The following 31 January, the free agent moved back to Portugal and its main league with C.D. Santa Clara.

In August 2021, 15 years after leaving, the 32-year-old Salomão returned to Estrela da Amadora on a three-year deal. After helping the club to return to the top flight at the end of the 2022–23 campaign, he left by mutual agreement.

Salomão agreed to a one-year contract at Liga 3 side F.C. Alverca on 22 September 2023.

== International career ==
In July 2011, Salomão turned down an offer from manager Luís Norton de Matos to represent his ancestral Guinea-Bissau at international level. His only appearance for the Portugal under-21 team consisted of 12 minutes in a 0–2 friendly home loss against Sweden in Anadia on 2 March 2010, after coming on as a substitute for S.C. Olhanense's Rabiola.

== Career statistics ==
Appearances and goals by club, season and competition
Club	Season	League			National cup		League cup		Continental		Other		Total	
Club	Season	Division	Apps	Goals	Apps	Goals	Apps	Goals	Apps	Goals	Apps	Goals	Apps	Goals
Casa Pia	2008–09	Terceira Divisão	14	6	0	0	—		—		—		14	6
Real Massamá	2009–10	Segunda Divisão	26	4	0	0	—		—		—		26	4
Sporting CP	2010–11	Primeira Liga	12	2	2	0	3	0	6 (Note: Appearances in UEFA Europa League)	2	—		23	4
Sporting CP	2013–14	Primeira Liga	3	0	0	0	1	0	—		—		4	0
Sporting CP	Total		15	2	2	0	4	0	6	2	—		27	4
Deportivo (loan)	2011–12	Segunda División	29	4	4	1	—		—		—		33	5
Deportivo (loan)	2012–13	La Liga	14	2	0	0	—		—		—		14	2
Deportivo (loan)	2013–14	Segunda División	6	1	0	0	—		—		—		6	1
Deportivo (loan)	2014–15	La Liga	6	1	1	0	—		—		—		7	1
Deportivo (loan)	Total		55	8	5	1	—		—		—		60	9
Sporting CP B	2013–14	Segunda Liga	7	0	—		—		—		—		7	0
Sporting CP B	2015–16	LigaPro	12	0	—		—		—		—		12	0
Sporting CP B	Total		19	0	—		—		—		—		19	0
Mallorca	2015–16	Segunda División	17	0	0	0	—		—		—		17	0
Mallorca	2016–17	Segunda División	17	0	2	1	—		—		—		19	1
Mallorca	Total		34	0	2	1	—		—		—		36	1
Dinamo București	2017–18	Liga I	35	9	3	0	—		2	0	—		40	9
Dinamo București	2018–19	Liga I	20	6	2	0	—		—		—		22	6
Dinamo București	Total		55	15	5	0	—		2	0	—		62	15
Al-Hazem	2018–19	Saudi Pro League	11	2	0	0	—		—		2 (Note: Appearances in Saudi Pro League relegation play-offs)	0	13	2
FCSB	2019–20	Liga I	3	0	0	0	—		2	0	—		5	0
Santa Clara	2019–20	Primeira Liga	10	0	0	0	0	0	—		—		10	0
Santa Clara	2020–21	Primeira Liga	17	0	4	0	—		—		—		21	0
Santa Clara	Total		27	0	4	0	0	0	—		—		31	0
Estrela Amadora	2021–22	Liga Portugal 2	26	2	3	0	0	0	—		—		29	2
Estrela Amadora	2022–23	Liga Portugal 2	25	0	1	1	3	1	—		1 (Note: Appearance in Primeira Liga promotion/relegation play-offs)	0	30	2
Estrela Amadora	Total		51	2	4	1	3	1	—		1	0	59	4
Alverca	2023–24	Liga 3	9	1	0	0	—		—		0	0	9	1
Career total			319	40	22	3	7	1	10	2	3	0	361	46

== Honours ==
Deportivo

- Segunda División: 2011–12
