= Music of Guinea-Bissau =

The music of Guinea-Bissau is most widely associated with the polyrhythmic genre of gumbe, the country's primary musical export. Tina and tinga are other popular genres.

== National music ==
Independence from Portugal was declared in 1973 after a long struggle. "Esta É a Nossa Pátria Bem Amada" ("This Is Our Beloved Country"), composed by Xiao He with words by Amílcar Cabral, is the national anthem of Guinea-Bissau, as it was of Cape Verde until 1996.

In contrast to other Portuguese colonies like Brazil, Angola, Mozambique and Cape Verde, the fado style hardly penetrated Guinea-Bissau's music. Popular song lyrics, however, are almost always in Guinea-Bissau Creole, a Portuguese-based creole language. They are often humorous and topical, revolving around current events and issues such as AIDS.

=== Social critique and censorship ===
Popular singers have had a stormy relationship with Guinea-Bissau's government. José Carlos Schwarz (Zé Carlos), who criticized the administration, died in a plane crash in Havana under suspicious circumstances. Later Super Mama Djambo supported the PAIGC while mocking its perceived nepotism and corruption.

Some performers were banned by the government, including Zé Manel after he began singing "Tustumunhus di aonti" (Yesterday's Testimony) in 1983, using lyrics written by Huco Monteiro, a poet. Justino Delgado, another popular singer, was arrested for criticizing President João Bernardo Vieira. Civil unrest and a small population have limited the wider influence of the country's music.

== Traditional music ==
Guinea-Bissau's 1,596,677 people (July 2011 estimate) include Balanta (30%), Fula (20%), Manjack (14%), Mandinka (13%) and Papel (7%). The European and Mulatto population is less than 1% and there is a small Chinese population.

The word gumbe is sometimes used generically to refer to any music of the country, but it refers specifically to a unique style that fuses about ten of the country's folk music traditions.

The Balanta play a gourd lute instrument called a kusunde, similar to the Jola akonting but with the short drone string (A#/B) at the bottom rather than the top. The top string is of middle length (open F#, stopped G#) while the middle string, the longest (open C#, stopped D#) is stopped by the top string and sounds the same.

Extent folk traditions include ceremonial music used in funerals, initiations and other rituals, as well as Balanta brosca and kussundé, Mandinga djambadon and the kundere sound of the Bijagos islands.

The calabash is a primary musical instrument of Guinea-Bissau, and is used in extremely swift and rhythmically complex dance music.

== Popular music ==
Gumbe, the first popular song tradition to arise in the country after independence, had begun in 1973 with the recording of Ernesto Dabó's "M'Ba Bolama" in Lisbon. Dabó's record producer, Zé Carlos, had formed the popular Cobiana Djazz in 1972. The next popular band was Super Mama Djombo with their 1980 debut Cambança, followed by Africa Livre, Chifre Preto and Kapa Negra.

In the 1980s genres like kussundé began to become popular, led by Kaba Mané, whose Chefo Mae Mae used electric guitar and Balanta lyrics.

Angolan pop music, called kizomba, supports a number of artists singing in both English and Portuguese.

== Discography ==
- Discography of Guinea Bissauan recordings - Radio Africa, Graeme Counsel
