= José Couceiro =

Portuguese football manager (born 1962)

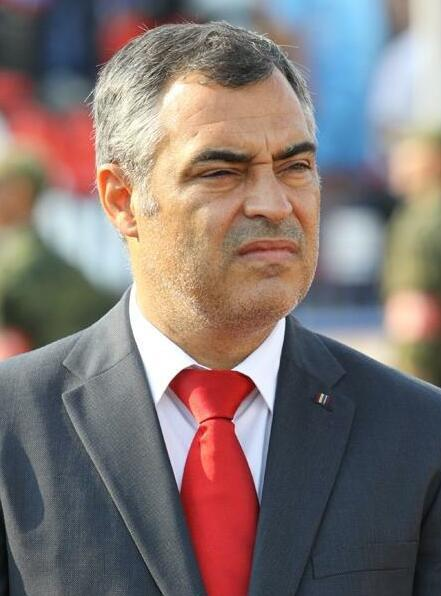
- Couceiro as Lokomotiv Moscow coach in 2011

Personal information
- Full name: José Júlio de Carvalho Peyroteo Martins Couceiro
- Date of birth: 4 October 1962 (age 64)
- Place of birth: Lisbon, Portugal
- Position: Defender

Senior career*
Years	Team	Apps	(Gls)
1981–1982	Montijo		
1982–1985	Barreirense		
1985–1986	Atlético CP		
1986–1988	Torreense		
1988–1989	Oriental		
1989–1991	Torreense		
1991–1992	Estrela da Amadora		

Managerial career
- 2002–2004: Alverca
- 2004–2005: Vitória de Setúbal
- 2005: Porto
- 2005–2006: Belenenses
- 2006–2007: Portugal U-21
- 2008: Kaunas
- 2008–2010: Lithuania
- 2009–2010: Gaziantepspor
- 2011: Sporting CP (caretaker)
- 2011–2012: Lokomotiv Moscow
- 2013–2014: Vitória de Setubal
- 2014–2015: Estoril
- 2016–2018: Vitória de Setúbal
- * Club domestic league appearances and goals

José Júlio de Carvalho Peyroteo Martins Couceiro (born 4 October 1962) is a Portuguese football manager, currently the national technical director of the Portuguese Football Federation.

== Managerial career ==
As a manager, Couceiro's career is marked with the relegation of Alverca in the 2003–04 season. He bounced back with a good run with Vitória de Setúbal, and won the best Portuguese coach prize. He then signed for Porto on 1 February 2005, going on to Belenenses during the 2005–06 season. In August 2006, he was appointed manager of the Portugal under-21 national team, reaching positive results in the UEFA Championships.

In July 2008, Couceiro was then appointed the head coach of Kaunas, the Lithuanian A Lyga club controlled by Vladimir Romanov. On 5 August 2008, Kaunas, playing in a UEFA Champions League play-off match, defeated 2007–08 UEFA Cup finalists Rangers 2–1 on aggregate to qualify for the third round for the first time in club history. He was then named head coach of the Lithuania national team on 14 August 2008. In his first competitive match as manager, Lithuania defeated Romania 3–0 in Cluj-Napoca for a 2010 FIFA World Cup qualifier. After that, they defeated Austria 2–0 at home, and the Faroe Islands 1–0. However, they did not qualify for the World Cup tournament proper, held in South Africa.

In April 2009, Couceiro signed as a manager with Turkish side Gaziantepspor.

On 26 February 2011, following the dismissal of Paulo Sérgio, Couceiro was named caretaker manager of Sporting CP for the remainder of the 2010–11 season. He then moved to Lokomotiv Moscow in July 2011, however left the club in May 2012 after his contract was not renewed.

After being appointed as manager of Vitória de Setubal in 2013, he was sacked on 15 May 2014. He then managed Estoril, leaving in March 2015. In May 2016, Couceiro was appointed manager of Vitória de Setubal for a third time. He left the role in May 2018.

In July 2018, he was appointed national technical director of the Portuguese Football Federation.

== Personal life ==
Fernando Peyroteo (1918-1978), a former star player of Sporting CP, was his great-uncle.
