= Luís Lourenço =

Angolan footballer (born 1983)

Personal information
- Full name: Luís Carlos Lourenço da Silva
- Date of birth: 5 June 1983 (age 43)
- Place of birth: Luanda, Angola
- Height: 1.72 m (5 ft 8 in)
- Position: Forward

Youth career
- 1992–2000: Sporting CP

Senior career*
Years	Team	Apps	(Gls)
2000–2003	Sporting CP B	52	(22)
2001	→ Bristol City (loan)	3	(1)
2002	→ Oldham Athletic (loan)	7	(1)
2003–2006	Sporting CP	17	(4)
2004–2005	→ Belenenses (loan)	26	(4)
2005–2006	→ União Leiria (loan)	24	(6)
2006–2007	Vitória Setúbal	8	(0)
2007	→ Panionios (loan)	14	(5)
2007–2009	Panionios	11	(2)
2009–2010	Kerkyra	28	(5)
2010	Moreirense	1	(0)
2011	Alzira	3	(0)
2012–2013	Farense	7	(1)
2013	Corona Brașov	1	(0)
2016	Pinhalnovense	9	(0)
2017	Atlético	12	(5)
Total		223	(56)

International career
1997–1999	Portugal U16	17	(6)
1998–1999	Portugal U17	7	(3)
1999–2001	Portugal U18	10	(0)
2001	Portugal U19	3	(0)
2001–2003	Portugal U20	17	(9)
2003–2006	Portugal U21	21	(5)
2004	Portugal U23	3	(1)
2004–2005	Portugal B	2	(1)
2011	Angola	1	(0)
Medal record
Men's football
Representing Portugal
UEFA European Under-21 Championship
Third place	2004 Germany
- * Club domestic league appearances and goals

Luís Carlos Lourenço da Silva (born 5 June 1983), known as Lourenço, is a former professional footballer who played as a forward.

== Club career ==
=== Sporting CP ===
Lourenço was born in Luanda, Angola. A Sporting CP youth graduate, he made his professional debut in England, serving two brief loan spells first at Bristol City then at Oldham Athletic, both in the Football League One. Additionally, he played and scored regularly for Sporting's reserves.

Lourenço made three appearances and scored once for Sporting in the 2003–04 UEFA Cup, making his Primeira Liga debut on 16 August 2003 in a 2–1 away win against Académica de Coimbra and scoring in the game (he found the net in the season's first three official matches). However, he gradually lost his importance in the squad, and spent the next years on loan to several clubs in the country.

=== Later career ===
Lourenço left Sporting in summer 2006, signing for Vitória de Setúbal. In the following January transfer window he moved countries again, joining Greek side Panionios FC, initially on loan. He hardly received any playing time after agreeing to a permanent two-year contract, being released on 1 July 2009.

Following a short and unassuming spell back in Portugal, Lourenço moved abroad again, signing with UD Alzira of the Spanish Segunda División B in January 2011. He reunited at the club with his former Sporting teammate Beto, and both were released in June after the team's relegation, having appeared in a combined total of three games.

== International career ==
Lourenço was picked for the Portuguese under-21 squads at two UEFA European Championships, 2004 and 2006. Additionally, he represented the nation at the 2004 Summer Olympics and the 2005 Vale do Tejo International Tournament (B team).

Lourenço eventually switched allegiance to Angola, earning his only cap on 10 August 2011 by coming on as an 85th-minute substitute for Manucho in a 0–0 friendly in Liberia.

== Honours ==
Sporting CP

- Taça de Portugal: 2001–02
