= Louis Wender =

Lithuanian psychologist and psychiatrist

- Born: Louis Wender c. 1890; Lithuania
- Died: February 8, 1966 (aged 75–76); New York City
- Known for: Pioneer on group therapy and the use of insulin injection and metrazol shock treatment
- Spouse: Luba Kibrick
- Children: Paul Wender and Ira T.
- Scientific career
- Fields: Psychology, psychiatry
- Institutions: Army Medical Corps; St. Elizabeths Hospital; New York Clinic for Mental Health; Hillside Hospital; Pinewood Psychiatric Hospital
- Academic advisors: Dr. William Alanson White

Louis Wender was a psychologist and psychiatrist known for being a pioneer on group therapy.

== Life ==
Louis Wender was born in Lithuania in c. 1890. His brother was named Joseph. He came to the United States in 1900, and graduated in medicine for the Long Island College Hospital Medical School in 1913.

During World War I, Wender served as lieutenant in the Army Medical Corps and was medical director of an Army hospital in the Canal Zone.

He was trained as a psychiatrist by Dr. William Alanson White in St. Elizabeths Hospital, Washington, D.C., and was trained in psychoanalysis in Vienna. He began practicing psychiatry in 1924 at New York Clinic for Mental Health and was a life fellow of the American Psychiatric Association, member of the New York Academy of Medicine and a diplomate of the American Board of Psychiatry and Neurology. He was also member of the Society for Psychotherapy and Psychopathology since its beginnings in 1935 and was one of the first secretaries of the society.

From 1927 to 1943, Wender was the medical director of the Hillside Hospital, Hastings-on-Hudson. In 1943, Wender was hired by Beth Israel Hospital. In 1950, he became chief psychologist of the institution. From 1944 to 1963, Wender was the medical director of Pinewood Psychiatric Hospital, Katonah.

Wender had an office at 59 East 79th Street.

He died on 8 February 1966 from a heart attack in Montefiore Einstein Medical Center.

== Work ==
Wender is known for being one of the pioneers of group therapy. He was part of the second wave of group analysts, together with Paul Schilder, Laura Bender and Alexander Wolf. He tried to distance his work from earlier authors, such as Trigant Burrow and Joseph Hersey Pratt. His method was strongly based on psychotherapy, proposed by Sigmund Freud.

In 1929, Wender established the new therapy modality on Hastings-on-Hudson to treat patients with "psychoneurotics". Wender saw the hospital and the therapist as a "substitute family" of the patient. He soon began to treat other conditions where there was no intellectual impairment and some degree of affect, including schizophrenia and depression. His therapy groups were composed of six to eight men who met two to three times a week for one-hour sessions. Women's groups were held by nurses, and there was an expectation to create mixed groups. Individual sessions were also held, and the patients were encouraged to maintain their friendship outside of the therapy group. The treatment lasted from four to five months.

During the sessions, Wender noticed that the patient opened himself more with other people than with the therapist, and he created a controlled competitive ambient for them to express their problems. The patient would then discuss his symptoms, and it seemed to increase their realization that their problems were similar to other people's problems. By working his small difficulties, the patient gradually was empowered to deal with the world. He wrote basic monographs on group therapy that were widely referred by other psychologists.

Wender is also known for being one of the pioneers of pharmaceutical therapy. He was one of the first to use insulin injection and metrazol shock treatment.

== Personal life ==
He was married with Luba Kibrick and had two sons, Paul Wender and Ira T.

Wender lived on 25 East 83d Street.

According to The New York Times, his resemblance with the Prime Minister of Israel Ben Gurion was such that he was cheered during a trip to Israel.

== Homages ==
His former patients created the Wender Welfare League, to help "discharged patients resume their place in society and assisted with the work of the hospital". The institution's name changed to League for Mental Health on Wender's request for the inclusion of others that were not his patients. Wender served on the league as honorary president and medical director of the consultation service.
