= Kifuta Kiala =

Congolese footballer

Personal information
- Full name: Kifuta Kiala Makangu
- Date of birth: 8 January 1988 (age 38)
- Place of birth: Kinshasa, Zaire
- Height: 1.80 m (5 ft 11 in)
- Position: Forward

Team information
- Current team: SSV Jeddeloh
- Number: 11

Youth career
- 2001–2003: Sporting CP
- 2003–2005: Estoril
- 2005–2006: Real

Senior career*
Years	Team	Apps	(Gls)
2006–2009	Real	15	(0)
2007–2008	→ Nelas (loan)	11	(3)
2009	Olivais Moscavide	17	(6)
2009–2011	Mafra	56	(11)
2011–2012	Oriental	23	(3)
2012	Real	6	(0)
2012–2013	Académico Viseu	21	(5)
2013–2015	BSV Schwarz-Weiß Rehden	45	(9)
2015–2020	VfB Oldenburg	101	(36)
2020–	SSV Jeddeloh	6	(1)
- * Club domestic league appearances and goals as of 22:11, 5 March 2021 (UTC)

Kifuta Kiala Makangu (born 8 January 1988) is a Congolese-Portuguese professional footballer who plays as a forward for SSV Jeddeloh of the Regionalliga Nord.

== Career ==
In summer 2020, Kiala signed for SSV Jeddeloh.
