= Roudolphe Douala =

Cameroonian footballer (born 1978)

Personal information
- Full name: Roudolphe Douala M'bela
- Date of birth: 25 September 1978 (age 48)
- Place of birth: Douala, Cameroon
- Height: 1.76 m (5 ft 9 in)
- Position: Winger

Youth career
- Saint-Étienne

Senior career*
Years	Team	Apps	(Gls)
1996–1998	Saint-Étienne B	47	(9)
1998–2004	Boavista	40	(6)
2000–2001	→ Aves (loan)	28	(4)
2001–2002	→ Gil Vicente (loan)	31	(4)
2002–2004	→ União Leiria (loan)	66	(15)
2004–2007	Sporting CP	47	(5)
2006–2007	→ Portsmouth (loan)	7	(0)
2007–2008	Saint-Étienne	12	(0)
2008–2009	Asteras Tripolis	12	(0)
2009	Plymouth Argyle	2	(0)
2010–2011	Lierse	11	(2)
Total		303	(45)

International career
2004–2009	Cameroon	17	(1)
- * Club domestic league appearances and goals

Roudolphe Douala M'bela (born 25 September 1978), known as Douala, is a Cameroonian former professional footballer.

Mainly a winger he could also operate as a forward, and played professionally in five countries, mainly in Portugal. He amassed Primeira Liga totals of 213 games and 34 goals over the course of nine seasons, notably representing in the competition Sporting CP (three years), Boavista and União Leiria (two apiece).

Douala appeared for the Cameroon national team at the 2006 Africa Cup of Nations.

== Club career ==
Douala was born in Douala. He holds Cameroonian and French nationalities.

He started his professional career at Saint-Étienne but did not make any Ligue 2 appearances for the French club, moving to Portugal when he was 20 and signing with Boavista.

After two loans, at Gil Vicente and União Leiria (where he first made an impact in the Primeira Liga championship), Douala moved to Sporting CP, scoring five league goals in his debut season while also helping the Lions to the campaign's UEFA Cup final, notably scoring against Middlesbrough in a 3–2 away win. Never an undisputed starter, however, he would be loaned for 2006–07 to England's Portsmouth on the very last day of the summer transfer window, with a view to a permanent signing.

Speculation during the 2007 winter window had linked Douala with a move away from the club, with the player reportedly frustrated at his lack of first team opportunities at Fratton Park. A transfer never materialized, however, and he revealed that "On the last day of the transfer window two clubs were calling me all day, but I said 'I want to stay'".

Douala returned to Sporting when his loan ended and, on 14 July 2007, rejoined old club Saint-Étienne for an undisclosed fee. After only one season where he appeared sparingly, he left for Asteras Tripolis in Greece. A fruitless spell soon followed and, after agreeing a release from his contract, he signed with English club Plymouth Argyle on 22 March 2009, for the remainder of the 2008–09 campaign, making his debut as a substitute in their 4–0 home win against Coventry City on 11 April; however, he was unsuccessful in securing a long-term deal, and was released.

On 15 March 2010, 31-year-old Douala moved teams and countries again, signing with Belgium's Lierse, and the club returned to the Pro League at the season's end, with the player contributing with one goal.

== International career ==
Douala earned 17 caps for Cameroon, during five years. He participated at the 2006 Africa Cup of Nations, helping the national team reach the quarter-final stage.

=== International goals ===
#	Date	Venue	Opponent	Result	Competition
1	8 October 2005	Ahmadou Ahidjo, Yaoundé, Cameroon	Egypt	1–1	2006 World Cup qualification

== Honours ==
=== Club ===
Sporting

- UEFA Cup: Runner-up 2004–05

=== Individual ===
- Primeira Liga: Player of the Month March 2004
