= Henrique (footballer, born 1980) =

Portuguese footballer

Personal information
- Full name: José Henrique Souto Esteves
- Date of birth: 31 March 1980 (age 46)
- Place of birth: Braga, Portugal
- Height: 1.85 m (6 ft 1 in)
- Position: Centre-forward

Youth career
- 1992–1994: Braga
- 1994–1995: Vilaverdense
- 1995–1996: Palmeiras Braga
- 1996–1999: Braga

Senior career*
Years	Team	Apps	(Gls)
1999–2004	Braga B	97	(34)
1999–2004	Braga	29	(2)
2001	→ Espinho (loan)	12	(5)
2004–2005	Estrela Amadora	28	(7)
2005–2006	Leixões	28	(6)
2006–2007	Vitória Guimarães	23	(4)
2007–2008	Santa Clara	23	(4)
2008–2009	Portimonense	25	(2)
2009–2010	Doxa	42	(18)
2011–2012	AEL Limassol	22	(2)
2012–2013	Olympiakos Nicosia	28	(13)
2013–2014	Ermis	30	(9)
2014–2015	Nea Salamina	23	(5)
2015–2017	Vilaverdense	41	(3)
Total		451	(114)
- * Club domestic league appearances and goals

José Henrique Souto Esteves (born 31 March 1980 in Braga), known as Henrique, is a Portuguese former footballer who played as a centre-forward.
