= Liédson =

Brazilian-born Portuguese footballer (born 1977)

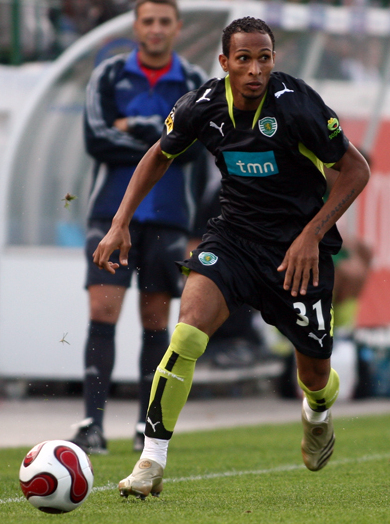
- Liédson playing for Sporting in 2007

Personal information
- Full name: Liédson da Silva Muniz
- Date of birth: 17 December 1977 (age 48)
- Place of birth: Cairu, Brazil
- Height: 1.75 m (5 ft 9 in)
- Position: Striker

Senior career*
Years	Team	Apps	(Gls)
1996–1999	Poções		
2000	Prudentópolis	15	(5)
2001–2002	Coritiba	9	(5)
2002–2003	Flamengo	24	(14)
2003	Corinthians	18	(10)
2003–2011	Sporting CP	214	(116)
2011–2012	Corinthians	34	(13)
2012–2013	Flamengo	17	(4)
2013	→ Porto (loan)	6	(0)
Total		337	(167)

International career
2009–2010	Portugal	15	(4)
- * Club domestic league appearances and goals

Liédson da Silva Muniz (born 17 December 1977), known simply as Liédson, is a former professional footballer who played as a striker.

Nicknamed Levezinho ("Slender one") due to his light frame (63 kg), he spent the bulk of his professional career in Portugal representing Sporting CP, scoring nearly 120 goals in more than 200 competitive matches, winning four major titles with the club and helping it to four Champions League participations.

Born in Brazil, Liédson became a Portuguese citizen in 2009 and appeared with the national team at the 2010 World Cup, already in his 30s.

== Club career ==
=== Early years ===
Born in Cairu, Bahia, Liédson started his professional career at Coritiba, aged 22. Before that he played amateur football on weekends, working at a supermarket during the week.

Liédson continued his career at Flamengo and Corinthians, traditional big clubs in Rio de Janeiro and São Paulo respectively, with relative individual success.

=== Sporting ===
Liédson was signed by Sporting CP for €2 million on 31 August 2003, giving manager Fernando Santos a new option following injuries and sales. On his debut, the "S" in his name was printed in reverse, which he took as a good omen and maintained it like that for the rest of his career.

Liédson was crowned top scorer in the Primeira Liga in his second season, scoring 25 goals while also netting nine in 14 games as his team reached the final of the UEFA Cup – this included a hat-trick in a 4–0 win at Dinamo Tbilisi in the group stage. The following year, he finished second in the scoring race, scoring 15 times from 31 appearances (28 of which he played the full 90 minutes) with an impressive mark of 2,899 minutes played; he was top scorer again in 2006–07, but the Lions only conquered one domestic cup during that timeframe.

Considered by many as one of the greatest strikers in Sporting history since the early performances of Fernando Peyroteo, Héctor Yazalde, Manuel Fernandes, Rui Jordão, Fernando Gomes, Alberto Acosta and Mário Jardel, Liédson was also regarded as the club's top trademark player since the departures of Luís Figo, Cristiano Ronaldo, Nani and Ricardo Quaresma. He also ranked team top scorer in the UEFA Champions League, after scoring the lonely goal in the 2008–09 group stage contest against Shakhtar Donetsk on 22 October 2008. In the last group stage match, he also found the net – in a 2–5 home loss to Barcelona – for the 19th time in European competition, another club best; on 1 November, he appeared in his 150th league match with the green-and-white striped jersey, 213 overall.

On 17 January 2010, after having missed one month due to injury, Liédson came from the bench to score twice, helping Sporting overcome Nacional 3–2 at home. On 7 March, all of the game's goals were his as his team beat last-placed Belenenses 4–0 away.

Liédson entered Sporting's history books on 21 October 2010 as he scored the club's 200th goal in European competitions, netting twice in a 5–1 home win against Gent for the Europa League.

=== Return to Brazil ===
On 31 January 2011, after having appeared in 310 official matches with Sporting, scoring 174 goals, 33-year-old Liédson returned to his homeland, signing with former club Corinthians. He was still allowed to play with the Lions the following Friday, starting and scoring twice against Naval, in a 3–3 home draw.

Liédson contributed with ten games in the 2012 Copa Libertadores campaign, scoring once in the 6–0 group stage home win against Deportivo Táchira of Venezuela (immediately after missing a penalty kick) as the Timão won the continental competition for the first time in its history. On 31 July, he left Corinthians after both club and player decided not to renew his contract.

On 2 August 2012, Liédson agreed on a return to Flamengo, signing until December of the following year. In late January of the following year, he came back to Portugal, joining Porto on a loan until the end of the season. On 11 May, he was involved in the goal that clinched the title for the Dragons against rivals Benfica in O Clássico; put on as a substitute by manager Vítor Pereira alongside Kelvin, he assisted the youngster's added-time winner.

== International career ==
Liédson expressed interest in playing for the Portugal national team despite being Brazilian-born. He stated: "If one day I was called up to play, I wouldn’t hesitate for a second, as I feel right at home in Portugal." After the retirement of striker Pauleta, Liédson was one of the main candidates in line for succession, especially after countrymen Deco and Pepe's previous switches. Liédson's naturalisation process created some controversy, as the Portuguese Footballers' Union in August 2009 publicly objected the Portuguese Football Federation's (FPF) plans of expediting his citizenship.

After six years of residence in Portugal, Liédson received citizenship, being eligible to play for the country. On 26 August 2009, he was called up by Carlos Queiroz for the 2010 FIFA World Cup qualifiers against Denmark and Hungary and made his debut against the former on 5 September, coming on as a substitute for Tiago at half-time. After having been booked, Liédson scored the equaliser in the 85th minute, heading the ball in from a corner.

Liédson started in Portugal's World Cup opener, a 0–0 draw against Ivory Coast. He lost his place to Hugo Almeida for the following match, but found the net twice in a 7–0 routing of North Korea on 21 June.

== Career statistics ==
=== Club ===
Appearances and goals by club, season and competition
Club	Season	League		State League		National cup		Other (Note: Includes the Taça da Liga and Supertaça Cândido de Oliveira.)		Continental		Total	
Club	Season	Apps	Goals	Apps	Goals	Apps	Goals	Apps	Goals	Apps	Goals	Apps	Goals
Prudentópolis	2000	0	0	15	5	–		–		–		15	5
Coritiba	2001	9	5	–		–		–		–		9	5
Coritiba	2002	–		18	15	2	0	–		–		20	15
Coritiba	Total	9	5	18	15	2	0	0	0	0	0	29	20
Flamengo	2002	24	14	–		–		–		–		24	14
Corinthians	2003	14	10	11	6	–		–		8	6	33	22
Sporting	2003–04	30	15	–		2	1	–		4	3	36	19
Sporting	2004–05	31	25	–		2	1	–		14	9	47	35
Sporting	2005–06	31	15	–		5	2	–		2	0	38	17
Sporting	2006–07	28	15	–		6	6	–		5	0	39	21
Sporting	2007–08	26	11	–		4	3	6	4	11	6	47	24
Sporting	2008–09	26	17	–		2	2	3	4	4	2	35	25
Sporting	2009–10	28	13	–		3	3	2	2	13	4	46	22
Sporting	2010–11	14	5	–		3	2	2	1	6	2	25	10
Sporting	Total	214	116	0	0	27	20	13	11	59	26	313	173
Corinthians	2011	28	12	16	11	–		–		–		44	23
Corinthians	2012	6	1	11	2	–		–		11	1	28	4
Corinthians	Total	34	13	27	13	0	0	0	0	11	1	72	27
Flamengo	2012	17	4	0	0	–		–		–		17	4
Porto (loan)	2012–13	6	0	–		0	0	1	0	0	0	7	0
Career total		318	162	68	39	29	20	14	11	78	33	601	266

=== International ===
Scores and results list Portugal's goal tally first, score column indicates score after each Liédson goal.

List of international goals scored by Liédson
No.	Date	Venue	Opponent	Score	Result	Competition
1	5 September 2009	Parken Stadium, Copenhagen, Denmark	Denmark	1–1	1–1	2010 World Cup qualification
2	10 October 2009	Estádio da Luz, Lisbon, Portugal	Hungary	2–0	3–0	2010 World Cup qualification
3	3 March 2010	Estádio Cidade de Coimbra, Coimbra, Portugal	China	2–0	2–0	Friendly
4	21 June 2010	Cape Town Stadium, Cape Town, South Africa	North Korea	5–0	7–0	2010 FIFA World Cup

== Honours ==
Corinthians

- Campeonato Brasileiro Série A: 2011
- Campeonato Paulista: 2003
- Copa Libertadores: 2012

Sporting

- Taça de Portugal: 2006–07, 2007–08
- Supertaça Cândido de Oliveira: 2007, 2008
- Taça da Liga: runner-up 2007–08, 2008–09
- UEFA Cup: runner-up 2004–05

Porto

- Primeira Liga: 2012–13
- Taça da Liga: runner-up 2012–13

Individual

- Copa Sul-Minas top scorer: 2002
- Bola de Prata: 2004–05, 2006–07
- SJPF Player of the Month: January 2006, April 2007, January 2009, April 2009, March 2010 (record)
- Campeonato Paulista top scorer: 2011
