= André Santos (footballer, born 1989) =

Portuguese footballer

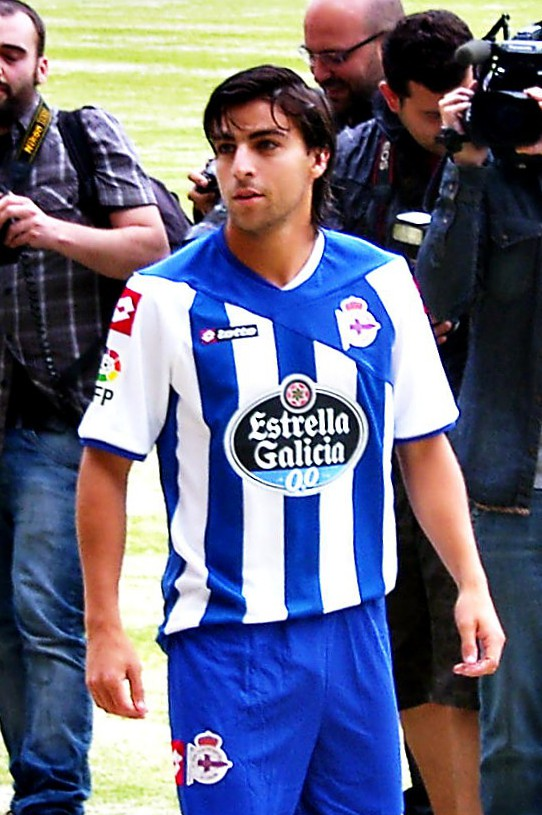
- Santos at his Deportivo presentation

Personal information
- Full name: André Filipe Bernardes Santos
- Date of birth: 2 March 1989 (age 37)
- Place of birth: Sobreiro Curvo, Portugal
- Height: 1.81 m (5 ft 11 in)
- Position: Defensive midfielder

Youth career
- 1998–2000: Lourinhanense
- 2000–2008: Sporting CP

Senior career*
Years	Team	Apps	(Gls)
2008–2013	Sporting CP	37	(2)
2008–2009	→ Fátima (loan)	16	(2)
2009–2010	→ União Leiria (loan)	39	(0)
2012–2013	→ Deportivo La Coruña (loan)	13	(0)
2013–2014	Vitória Guimarães	25	(0)
2014–2015	Balıkesirspor	11	(1)
2015–2016	Metz	28	(1)
2016–2018	Arouca	48	(1)
2018	→ Universitatea Craiova (loan)	7	(0)
2018–2020	B-SAD	54	(3)
2020–2022	Grasshoppers	43	(2)
2023	Vitória Setúbal	13	(0)
2023–2025	Oliveirense	41	(1)
2025–2026	Varzim	6	(0)

International career
2007	Portugal U18	4	(2)
2007–2008	Portugal U19	11	(0)
2009–2010	Portugal U21	15	(1)
2010–2011	Portugal U23	3	(0)
2011	Portugal	2	(0)
- * Club domestic league appearances and goals as of 17:14, 27 January 2026 (UTC)

André Filipe Bernardes Santos (born 2 March 1989) is a Portuguese professional footballer who plays as a defensive midfielder.

== Club career ==
=== Sporting CP ===
Born in Sobreiro Curvo, Torres Vedras, Santos joined Sporting CP's youth system at the age of 11. He made his senior debut while on loan, with C.D. Fátima of the third division and U.D. Leiria; in the 2009–10 season, with the latter, he first appeared in the Primeira Liga, playing 30 complete games to help the club finish in ninth place and being the first Portuguese player to achieve the feat in the league in the process.

Santos returned to the Lions for 2010–11, playing his first official match with the side on 5 August in a 2–1 home win against FC Nordsjælland in the UEFA Europa League. He scored his first goal as a professional exactly four months later, helping the visiting team defeat 3–1 Portimonense SC, and finished the campaign with 42 appearances in all competitions (two goals).

On 25 August 2011, also in the Europa League and against the same Danish opponent, and with the same match result but now in the playoff round, Santos netted to eventually help Sporting reach the group stage as that was also the aggregate score. However, he eventually lost his importance in the squad under new manager Domingos Paciência.

In June 2012, Santos moved alongside a host of compatriots – including Sporting teammate Diogo Salomão – to Deportivo de La Coruña from Spain, in a season-long loan. He made his La Liga debut on 1 September by coming on as a late substitute in a 1–1 home draw with Getafe CF, but featured sparingly overall and the Galicians were also relegated.

=== Later career ===
On 8 August 2014, after one season back in his homeland with Vitória de Guimarães, Santos changed teams and countries again, joining Balıkesirspor in the Süper Lig. In July 2015, he signed a two-year contract with FC Metz of the French Ligue 2.

Santos spent the better part of the following four campaigns back in the Portuguese top tier, with F.C. Arouca and B-SAD. In between, he served a small loan at Romania's CS Universitatea Craiova.

On 28 August 2020, Santos agreed to a deal at Grasshopper Club Zurich. After two years and promotion to the Swiss Super League in his first season, his two-year contract expired and was not renewed.

Santos alternated between the Portuguese second and third divisions until his retirement, representing Vitória de Setúbal, U.D. Oliveirense and Varzim SC.

== International career ==
Santos earned 30 caps for Portugal at youth level, scoring three times. He made his debut for the full side on 29 March 2011, replacing Rúben Micael for the last 15 minutes of a 2–0 friendly win over Finland in Aveiro.

== Career statistics ==
As of 11 May 2013

Club	Season	League		Cup		League Cup		Europe		Total	
Club	Season	Apps	Goals	Apps	Goals	Apps	Goals	Apps	Goals	Apps	Goals
Fátima	2008–09	16	2	2	0	0	0	0	0	18	2
Total		16	2	2	0	0	0	0	0	18	2
União Leiria	2008–09	9	0	0	0	0	0	0	0	9	0
União Leiria	2009–10	30	0	1	0	4	0	0	0	35	0
Total		39	0	1	0	4	0	0	0	44	0
Sporting CP	2010–11	26	2	3	0	3	0	10	0	42	2
Sporting CP	2011–12	11	0	3	0	2	0	9	2	25	2
Total		37	2	6	0	5	0	19	2	67	4
Deportivo	2012–13	13	0	2	0	0	0	0	0	15	0
Total		13	0	2	0	0	0	0	0	15	0
Career total		105	4	11	0	9	0	19	2	144	6
