= Veysel Cihan =

Turkish footballer

Personal information
- Full name: Veysel Cihan
- Date of birth: 4 February 1976 (age 50)
- Place of birth: Avanos, Nevşehir, Turkey
- Height: 1.86 m (6 ft 1 in)
- Position: Centre forward

Senior career*
Years	Team	Apps	(Gls)
1994–1998	Nevşehirspor	93	(33)
1998–2002	Denizlispor	97	(32)
2002–2004	Gençlerbirliği	66	(19)
2004–2005	Beşiktaş	29	(5)
2006–2007	Gaziantepspor	40	(5)
2007–2009	Konyaspor	61	(13)
2009–2011	Antalyaspor	48	(10)
2011–2012	Boluspor	26	(5)
Total		460	(122)

International career
2002–2003	Turkey A2	4	(0)
- * Club domestic league appearances and goals

Veysel Cihan (born 4 February 1976) is a retired Turkish professional football player who played as a striker.

He played for the Turkey national football team four times, scoring zero goals.
