= Jaime Júnior =

Brazilian footballer

Personal information
- Full name: Jaime Júnior da Silva Aquino
- Date of birth: April 27, 1979 (age 47)
- Place of birth: Belém, Brazil
- Height: 1.81 m (5 ft 11 in)
- Position: Midfielder

Youth career
- 1998–2000: Remo
- 2000–2002: Grêmio Anápolis

Senior career*
Years	Team	Apps	(Gls)
2000	Remo	2	(0)
2002	Grêmio Anápolis		
2002–2003	Vitória Guimarães	11	(0)
2003–2004	Rio Ave	28	(5)
2004–2005	Braga	42	(3)
2006	União Leiria	13	(0)
2006–2007	Estrela Amadora	22	(4)
2007–2008	Racing Ferrol	17	(3)
2008	Leixões	5	(0)
2008	Otopeni	10	(0)
2009	Remo	0	(0)
2010	Águia de Marabá	8	(1)
2011	Alecrim	3	(2)
2011	Campinense	3	(0)
2012	Itumbiara	7	(1)
Total		171	(19)
- * Club domestic league appearances and goals as of 12 September 2022

Jaime Júnior da Silva Aquino (born April 27, 1979 in Brazil), known as just Jaime Júnior, is a retired Brazilian footballer.
