= Paul Wender (psychiatrist) =

American biochemist and psychiatrist

- Born: Paul H. Wender; 1934; Manhattan, New York
- Died: July 16, 2016 (aged 82); London, Greater London
- Education: Harvard College; Columbia University College of Physicians and Surgeons
- Known for: Researching the genetic origins of schizophrenia and ADHD, diagnosing ADHD in adults
- Spouse(s): Dorothea Schmidt; Esther Hyatt; Frances Burger
- Parent(s): Luba Kibrick and Louis Wender
- Awards: Hoffmann Medal; William A. Schoenfeld Award; Distinguished Professor of Psychiatry at the University of Utah; First Prize for Research; Hofheimer Award
- Scientific career
- Fields: Psychiatry, biochemistry, genetics
- Institutions: Johns Hopkins Medical School; St Elizabeth's Hospital; Massachusetts Mental Health Center; University of Utah School of Medicine; Phillips Academy; Harvard Medical School; McLean Hospital

Paul H. Wender, also known as Dean of ADHD, was a biochemist and psychiatrist known for researching the genetic linkage in schizophrenia and ADHD.

== Biography ==
Paul Wender was born in Manhattan, New York in 1934. His mother, Luba Kibrick, was a social worker and his father, Dr. Louis Wender, was trained by one of Sigmund Freud's disciples and was chief psychiatrist at Hastings Hillside Hospital in Hastings-on-Hudson, where he became notorious for implementing group therapy, a new field of psychology at a time. He had a brother, called Ira.

Wender graduated in Walden School and began his studies about biochemistry at Phi Beta Kappa Harvard College. He successfully finished his graduation.

In 1962, he graduated in psychiatry by Columbia University College of Physicians and Surgeons. He worked as an assistant professor at Johns Hopkins Medical School and as researcher at St Elizabeth's Hospital. Afterwards, he served the army during the Korean War and was assigned as a Special Fellow in Child Psychiatry at Massachusetts Mental Health Center. In 1963, he and two colleagues researched if schizophrenia was caused by genes or the ambient. They discovered that the main cause was in fact genetic.

In 1973, he became an Emeritus Professor at the University of Utah School of Medicine. In 1990, he was retired from his position and began lecturing in Phillips Academy, where he focused his efforts in studying ADHD. He also found a genetical linkage to the condition and was one of the first people to diagnose ADHD in adults. In 1990, he was named Distinguished Professor. He then moved to Andover and began lecturing at Harvard Medical School and became a senior consultant on the Development of Bio psychiatry Research at McLean Hospital.

He was also known for helping to found the National Foundation for Depressive Illness and the American Society of Clinical Psychopharmacology. He also worked for the pharmaceutical industry and later regretted this period of his life.

Wender died on July 16, 2016, in Lahey Hospital and Medical Center from a ruptured aortic aneurysm. He was travelling with his wife at the Provence area of France and died during a stop in London.

== Research ==
During his time at Harvard, Wender was interested in behaviorism and was introduced to psychoanalysis by his father, that handled him the book A General Introduction to Psychoanalysis. He thought that many of Freud's affirmations lacked evidence, and grew skeptical of psychoanalytic methodology.

The genetic cause for schizophrenia was already observed in animals, but not humans. In 1959, Seymour Kety was looking forward a controlled experiment in humans and discovered Paul's work. Wender was convinced about the linkage of genetics and schizophrenia after reading the German literature about the subject. In 1963, Wender, Kety, Rosenthal and Schulsinger observed that the parents of schizophrenic children suffered from the same symptoms as the kids. They then applied the so-called Danish-American adoption study of schizophrenia methodology, where they compared data from biological and adoptive parents of schizophrenic children, and successfully linked schizophrenia to genetic causes. The first well-controlled test was presented in 1967 at the Transmission of Schizophrenia meeting.

Wender was also important in the research of attention deficit hyperactivity disorder (ADHD). In 1971, Wender published his first monograph on children suffering of the so-called "minimal brain dysfunction", what today is understood as ADHD. At the time, many people were skeptical if the mental health condition was real, or that it was caused by brain damage, but Wender proved it to have genetic causes. He also observed the lack of dopamine in his patients brains. Wender is a pioneer in the field of ADHD in adults. In 1976, Wender proposed 61 items (WURS-61) for the diagnostic of ADHD in adults, the so-called Wender-Utah or Wender-Reimherr Criteria. Later, 25 of the itens were selected (WURS-25) and used by the Diagnostic and Statistical Manual (DSM). In 1995, Wender published the first description of adults with ADHD, used in the XXI century as a guide to diagnosis and treatment by psychologists. He also studied medications that are an accepted treatment for ADHD.

During his life, he published seven books and over 100 scholarly monographs.

== Personal life ==
Wender first marriage was with Dorothea Schmidt, a classics professor at Wheaton College, and had two children. He divorced and married Dr. Esther Hyatt, professor at University of Utah School of Medicine, but he also divorced. He then married Frances Burger, and stayed with her until his death. In total, he had three children, Jocelyn Wender-Shubow, Leslie Evangelista and Melissa, and one stepson, James Murdock.

He played the flute and piano and enjoyed skiing. He also attended the annual Harvard-Yale football game.

== Tributes and awards ==
- The American Society of Clinical Psychopharmacology handles the annual Paul Wender Award for the best paper from The Journal of Clinical Psychiatry.
- Hoffmann Medal (2015)
- William A. Schoenfeld Award (2000)
- Distinguished Professor of Psychiatry at the University of Utah (1990)
- First Prize for Research (1974)
- Hofheimer Award

== Selected bibliography ==
- Klein, Donald F.; Wender, Paul H. (1993). Understanding depression: a complete guide to its diagnosis and treatment. New York: Oxford Univ. Press. ISBN 9780195072792.
- Klein, Donald F; Wender, PH (1988). Do You have a Depressive Illness? How to Tell, what to do. Penguin. ISBN 9780452260627.
- Wender, Paul H.; Klein, Donald F. (1981). Mind, mood, and medicine: a guide to the new biopsychiatry (1. print ed.). New York: Farrar, Straus, Giroux. ISBN 978-0374208950.
- Wender, Paul H. (1973). The hyperactive child. A handbook for parents. New York: Crown. ISBN 978-0517503522.
- Wender, Paul H. (February 1973). "Minimal Brain Dysfunction in Children: Diagnosis and Management". Pediatric Clinics of North America. 20 (1): 187–202. doi:10.1016/S0031-3955(16)32819-X. PMID 4581984.
