= Adriano Rossato =

Brazilian footballer (born 1977)

Personal information
- Full name: Adriano Fabiano Rossato
- Date of birth: 27 August 1977 (age 49)
- Place of birth: Vila Velha, Brazil
- Height: 1.73 m (5 ft 8 in)
- Position: Left back

Senior career*
Years	Team	Apps	(Gls)
1997	Botafogo	5	(0)
1998	Rio Branco-ES		
1998	Criciúma		
1999	Portuguesa-RJ		
2000–2001	União Barbarense		
2002	Marília		
2002–2004	Nacional	64	(17)
2004	Porto	0	(0)
2004–2007	Real Sociedad	24	(1)
2005–2006	→ Braga (loan)	19	(0)
2007	→ União Leiria (loan)	11	(0)
2007–2009	Málaga	37	(2)
2009–2010	Salamanca	31	(3)
2011–2013	Comercial	23	(2)

Managerial career
- 2016–2017: Desportiva Ferroviária
- * Club domestic league appearances and goals

Adriano Fabiano Rossato (born 27 August 1977 in Vila Velha, Espírito Santo) is a Brazilian former footballer who played as a left back, and is a manager.

== Football career ==
During his Brazilian career, free kick specialist Rossato represented Botafogo, Rio Branco-ES, Criciúma, Portuguesa-RJ, União Barbarense and Marília, moving to Portugal in July 2002 with Madeira's Nacional. During two seasons he scored an impressive 17 Primeira Liga goals, including a hat-trick against Beira-Mar on 25 April 2004 (3–0 home win).

Bought by Porto in July 2004, Rossato never played an official game for the northerners. He then joined La Liga side Real Sociedad, scoring – from a free kick – in only his second season appearance, a 1–2 loss to Sevilla, finishing with 22 matches.

For 2005–06, Rossato was loaned back to Portugal, signing with Braga on a one-year deal. Having returned to Sociedad for the following campaign, he returned - again on loan - to the Iberian neighbours, moving to União Leiria in January 2007.

Released in the summer of 2007, Rossato joined second division team Málaga, being instrumental in the Andalusians' 2008 top flight return after a two-year absence. He would miss, however, the vast majority of the next season due to injury; his first match took place only on 17 May 2009, as he played the second half of a 1–2 away loss to Sporting Gijón (12 minutes played).

Because of his injuries, Málaga announced in July 2009 it would not renew Rossato's contract, so the player was released. Late in the following month the 32-year-old signed for another club in the country, second level's Salamanca.
