= Zé Manel =

In Portuguese, Zé Manel or Ze'Manel (Portuguese pronunciation: [zɛmɐˈnɛl]) is a common short form of the name José Manuel, and can refer to:

- José Manuel Durão Barroso, the former President of the European Commission
- José Manuel da Silva Fernandes, a football player
- Zé Manel, a singer and instrumentalist from Guinea-Bissau
- José Manuel Cerqueira Afonso dos Santos, a folk musician and political icon, also known as Zeca Afonso or only Zeca
