= Evandro (footballer, born 1974) =

Brazilian footballer

Personal information
- Full name: Evandro Carlos Escardalete
- Date of birth: 12 February 1974 (age 52)
- Place of birth: São Paulo, Brazil
- Height: 1.86 m (6 ft 1 in)
- Position: Forward

Senior career*
Years	Team	Apps	(Gls)
1992–1995	Taubaté		
1995–1996	Londrina		
1996–1997	Criciúma		
1997–1998	Mirassol		
1998	União Bandeirante		
1998–2000	ABC		
2000–2010	Rio Ave	268	(76)
2010	Guaçuano		
- * Club domestic league appearances and goals

Evandro Carlos Escardalete (born 12 February 1974), known simply as Evandro, is a Brazilian retired footballer who played mainly as a forward.

== Club career ==
After playing with modest teams in his native country (Esporte Clube Taubaté, Londrina Esporte Clube, Criciúma Esporte Clube, Mirassol Futebol Clube, União Bandeirante FC and ABC Futebol Clube), São Paulo-born Evandro moved in 2000 to Portugal, joining Rio Ave F.C. in the second division. He became an instant first choice, going on to amass more than 300 overall appearances for the Vila do Conde club.

In the 2003–04 season, as Rio Ave had just been promoted to the Primeira Liga, Evandro scored 15 goals in 26 games, notably two in a 4–0 home rout of Sporting CP and another in a 1–1 home draw against S.L. Benfica, helping the side finish in seventh place. From 2008 to 2010, he appeared in a combined 33 league matches – only six in the latter top level campaign – and did not manage to find the net.

After a decade with same team, and a brief spell in his homeland with amateurs Clube Atlético Guaçuano, Evandro retired from football at the age of 36.
