= 2024–25 Neftçi PFK season =

Neftçi
2024–25 season
- Manager: Roman Hryhorchuk (until 7 October); Samir Abasov (from 14 October)
- Stadium: Neftçi Arena
- Premier League: 6th
- Azerbaijan Cup: Semi-final vs Sabah
- Top goalscorer: League: Filip Ozobić (8); All: Filip Ozobić (8)
- Highest home attendance: 9,355 vs Qarabağ (16 February 2025)
- Lowest home attendance: 200 vs Sumgayit (21 February 2025)
- Average home league attendance: 2,209 (18 May 2025)

The Neftçi 2024–25 season was Neftçi's 33rd Azerbaijan Premier League season. Neftchi will compete in the Azerbaijan Premier League and the Azerbaijan Cup.

== Season overview ==
On 26 June, Neftçi announced Roman Hryhorchuk as their new head coach on a two-year contract after they had decided not to extend their contract with Miodrag Božović at the end of the previous season.

On 29 June, Neftçi announced the signing of Emil Safarov from Gabala to a three-year contract, and the signing of Edvin Kuč from Ballkani to a two-year contract.

On 16 July, Neftçi announced the signing of Ramil Sheydayev from Kocaelispor to a three-year contract.

On 22 July, Neftçi announced the signing of Robert Bauer from Al-Tai to a three-year contract.

On 30 July, Neftçi announced the signing of Andriy Shtohrin from Chornomorets Odesa to a three-year contract.

On 9 August, Neftçi announced the season-long loan signing of Rustam Samigullin from Sabah.

On 12 August, Neftçi announced the signing of Raphael Guzzo from Chaves to a two-year contract.

On 23 August, Neftçi announced the signing of Moustapha Seck from Portimonense to a three-year contract.

On 28 August, Neftçi announced the signing of Dembo Darboe from Al-Nasr to a two-year contract.

On 7 October, Roman Hryhorchuk left the club by mutual agreement, with Samir Abbasov being appointed as his replacement on 14 October to a two-year contract.

On 14 January, Neftçi announced that Keelan Lebon had left the club after his contract was terminated by mutual consent. Later the same day, Neftçi announced the signing of Ryonosuke Ohori from TransINVEST on a contract a until the end of the season, with an option to extend it for an additional two-seasons.

On 22 January, Neftçi announced the signing of Elvin Camalov from Sabah to an 18-month contract, with the option of an additional year.

On 8 February, Neftçi announced the signing of Bassala Sambou from Enosis Neon Paralimni to an 18-month contract.

On 8 February, Neftçi announced the signing of Alex Fernandes on loan from Baltika Kaliningrad for the remainder of the season with the option of another six-months.

== Squad ==
As of match played 24 May 2025

No.	Name	Nationality	Position	Date of birth (age)	Signed from	Signed in	Contract ends	Apps.	Goals
Goalkeepers
1	Emil Balayev	(Azerbaijan)	GK	17 April 1994 (aged 31)	Sabail	2023	2025	18	0
30	Rustam Samigullin	(Azerbaijan)	GK	23 December 2002 (aged 22)	on loan from Sabah	2024	2025	0	0
93	Rza Jafarov	(Azerbaijan)	GK	3 July 2003 (aged 21)	Academy	2022		63	0
Defenders
3	Hojjat Haghverdi	(Azerbaijan)	DF	3 February 1993 (aged 32)	Sumgayit	2023		77	0
19	Azər Salahlı	(Azerbaijan)	DF	11 April 1994 (aged 31)	Keşla	2021		101	2
23	Robert Bauer	(Germany)	DF	9 April 1995 (aged 30)	Al-Tai	2024	2027	15	0
24	Moustapha Seck	(Senegal)	DF	23 February 1996 (aged 29)	Portimonense	2024	2027	31	0
44	Yuri Matias	(Brazil)	DF	10 February 1995 (aged 30)	CFR Cluj	2023	2025	70	10
99	Erwin Koffi	(Ivory Coast)	DF	10 January 1995 (aged 30)	Pau	2023	2025	74	3
Midfielders
4	Elvin Camalov	(Azerbaijan)	MF	4 February 1995 (aged 30)	Sabah	2025	2026 (+1)	16	1
6	Raphael Guzzo	(Portugal)	MF	6 January 1995 (aged 30)	Chaves	2024	2026	15	0
7	Azer Aliyev	(Azerbaijan)	MF	12 May 1994 (aged 31)	Ufa	2022	2025	68	2
8	Emin Mahmudov	(Azerbaijan)	MF	27 April 1992 (aged 33)	Boavista	2017	2025	255	61
10	Filip Ozobić	(Azerbaijan)	MF	8 April 1991 (aged 34)	Unattached	2023	2025	70	16
13	Emil Safarov	(Azerbaijan)	MF	30 October 2002 (aged 22)	Gabala	2024	2027	25	1
14	Edvin Kuč	(Montenegro)	MF	27 October 1993 (aged 31)	Ballkani	2024	2026	32	1
17	Rahman Hajiyev	(Azerbaijan)	MF	25 July 1993 (aged 31)	Baku	2014		245	26
18	Ryonosuke Ohori	(Japan)	MF	10 January 2001 (aged 24)	TransINVEST	2025	2025(+2)	11	0
20	Alpha Conteh	(Sierra Leone)	MF	1 May 2000 (aged 25)	Lokomotiv Plovdiv	2024	2026	25	1
47	Murad Mammadov	(Azerbaijan)	MF	26 April 2006 (aged 19)	Academy	2024		22	1
78	Elcan Abilov	(Azerbaijan)	MF	9 September 2004 (aged 20)	Academy	2024		2	0
88	Andriy Shtohrin	(Ukraine)	MF	14 December 1998 (aged 26)	Chornomorets Odesa	2024	2027	29	3
Forwards
9	Bassala Sambou	(Germany)	FW	15 October 1997 (aged 27)	Enosis Neon Paralimni	2025	2026	14	4
11	Alex Fernandes	(Brazil)	FW	3 June 2002 (aged 22)	on loan from Baltika Kaliningrad	2025	2025	16	1
22	Dembo Darboe	(The Gambia)	FW	17 August 1998 (aged 26)	Al-Nasr	2024	2026	19	5
77	Yegor Bogomolsky	(Belarus)	FW	3 June 2000 (aged 24)	Minsk	2022	2025	80	11
90	Ramil Sheydayev	(Azerbaijan)	FW	15 March 1996 (aged 29)	Kocaelispor	2024	2027	31	4
91	Agadadash Salyanski	(Azerbaijan)	FW	19 June 2004 (aged 20)	Academy	2022		36	5
Away on loan
21	Ismayil Zulfugarli	(Azerbaijan)	MF	16 April 2001 (aged 24)	Academy	2019	2025	66	4
Left during the season
1	Ivan Brkić	(Croatia)	GK	29 June 1995 (aged 28)	Riga	2022	2025	68	0
2	Qara Qarayev	(Azerbaijan)	MF	12 October 1992 (aged 32)	Qarabağ	2023	2025 (+1)	28	1
4	Márk Tamás	(Hungary)	DF	28 October 1993 (aged 31)	Sepsi OSK	2023	2025	38	0
6	Mudo Valdez	(Paraguay)	MF	14 November 1993 (aged 31)	Guaraní	2023	2024 (+1)	26	3
9	Andre Shinyashiki	(Brazil)	FW	11 June 1997 (aged 27)	Charlotte FC	2023	2025	36	4
11	Keelan Lebon	(Collectivity of Saint Martin)	FW	4 July 1997 (aged 27)	Astana	2023		72	6
16	Lucas Melano	(Argentina)	FW	1 March 1993 (aged 32)	Sarmiento	2023	2024(+1)	11	0
27	Farid Yusifli	(Azerbaijan)	MF	20 February 2002 (aged 23)	Academy	2019		38	0

== Transfers ==
=== In ===
Date	Position	Nationality	Name	From	Fee	Ref.
29 June 2024	MF	(Azerbaijan)	Emil Safarov	Gabala	Undisclosed	
29 June 2024	MF	(Montenegro)	Edvin Kuč	Ballkani	Undisclosed	
16 July 2024	FW	(Azerbaijan)	Ramil Sheydayev	Kocaelispor	Undisclosed	
22 July 2024	DF	(Germany)	Robert Bauer	Al-Tai	Undisclosed	
30 July 2024	MF	(Ukraine)	Andriy Shtohrin	Chornomorets Odesa	Undisclosed	
12 August 2024	MF	(Portugal)	Raphael Guzzo	Chaves	Undisclosed	
23 August 2024	DF	(Senegal)	Moustapha Seck	Portimonense	Undisclosed	
28 August 2024	FW	(The Gambia)	Dembo Darboe	Al-Nasr	Undisclosed	
14 January 2025	MF	(Japan)	Ryonosuke Ohori	TransINVEST	Undisclosed	
22 January 2025	MF	(Azerbaijan)	Elvin Camalov	Sabah	Undisclosed	
8 February 2025	FW	(Germany)	Bassala Sambou	Enosis Neon Paralimni	Undisclosed	

=== Loans in ===
Date from	Position	Nationality	Name	From	Date to	Ref.
9 August 2024	GK	(Azerbaijan)	Rustam Samigullin	Sabah	End of season	
8 February 2025	FW	(Brazil)	Alex Fernandes	Baltika Kaliningrad	End of season	

=== Loans out ===
Date from	Position	Nationality	Name	To	Date to	Ref.
9 August 2024	MF	(Azerbaijan)	Ismayil Zulfugarli	Turan Tovuz	End of season	

=== Released ===
Date	Position	Nationality	Name	Joined	Date	Ref
9 July 2024	GK	(Croatia)	Ivan Brkić	Motor Lublin		
24 July 2024	MF	(Paraguay)	Mudo Valdez	Sol de América		
22 August 2024	MF	(Azerbaijan)	Farid Yusifli	Turan Tovuz		
29 August 2024	FW	(Argentina)	Lucas Melano	Miami FC	5 February 2025	
19 September 2024	MF	(Azerbaijan)	Qara Qarayev	Araz-Naxçıvan	30 October 2024	
26 November 2024	FW	(Brazil)	Andre Shinyashiki	Arda Kardzhali	13 February 2025	
4 January 2025	DF	(Hungary)	Márk Tamás	Sepsi OSK	7 January 2025	
14 January 2025	FW	(Collectivity of Saint Martin)	Keelan Lebon	Athens Kallithea	5 February 2025	
31 May 2025	DF	(Azerbaijan)	Hojjat Haghverdi	Sumgayit	3 September 2025	
31 May 2025	DF	(Azerbaijan)	Azər Salahlı	Imishli		
31 May 2025	DF	(Brazil)	Yuri Matias	Ajman Club		
31 May 2025	MF	(Azerbaijan)	Azer Aliyev			
31 May 2025	MF	(Azerbaijan)	Rahman Hajiyev	Sabail	23 July 2025	
31 May 2025	FW	(Belarus)	Yegor Bogomolsky	Zira	7 June 2025	

== Competitions ==
=== Overview ===
Competition	First match	Last match	Starting round	Final position	Record							
Competition	First match	Last match	Starting round	Final position	Pld	W	D	L	GF	GA	GD	Win %
Premier League	3 August 2024	24 May 2025	Matchday 1	6th	36	10	13	13	39	49	−10	27.78
Azerbaijan Cup	4 December 2024	23 April 2025	Last 16	Semi-final	5	3	1	1	11	3	+8	60.00
Total					41	13	14	14	50	52	−2	31.71

Last updated: 24 May 2025
Source: Competitions

=== Premier League ===
==== League table ====
Pos	Team	Pld	W	D	L	GF	GA	GD	Pts	Qualification or relegation
4	Turan Tovuz	36	14	13	9	45	39	+6	55	
5	Sabah	36	10	18	8	50	46	+4	48	Qualification for the Europa League first qualifying round (Note: Sabah qualified for the Europa League first qualifying round as the 2024–25 Azerbaijan Cup winners.)
6	Neftçi	36	10	13	13	39	49	−10	43	
7	Shamakhi	36	9	9	18	32	46	−14	36	
8	Sumgayit	36	9	6	21	31	53	−22	33	

Source: Soccerway
Rules for classification: 1) Points; 2) Matches won; 3) Goal difference; 4) Goals scored; 5) Head-to-head points; 6) Head-to-head goal difference; 7) Lower number of points based on yellow and red cards; 8) Draw.

==== Results summary ====
Overall								Home						Away					
Pld	W	D	L	GF	GA	GD	Pts	W	D	L	GF	GA	GD	W	D	L	GF	GA	GD
36	10	13	13	39	49	−10	43	6	7	5	22	22	0	4	6	8	17	27	−10

Last updated: 24 May 2025.
Source: See Results

==== Results by round ====
Round	1	2	3	4	5	6	7	8	9	10	11	12	13	14	15	16	17	18	19	20	21	22	23	24	25	26	27	28	29	30	31	32	33	34	35	36
Ground	H	A	H	A	A	A	A	H	A	H	A	H	H	H	H	A	H	A	H	A	H	A	H	H	A	H	A	H	A	H	A	A	H	A	H	A
Result	D	D	L	D	D	L	L	D	L	W	D	L	D	W	L	L	W	D	D	L	W	W	L	W	L	D	W	D	W	L	L	D	D	W	W	L
Position	6	6	7	9	9	9	9	8	9	7	8	8	8	7	8	8	7	8	7	7	7	6	6	6	6	6	6	6	6	6	6	6	6	6	6	6

Updated to match(es) played on 24 May 2025. Source: See Results
A = Away; H = Home; W = Win; D = Draw; L = Loss

==== Results ====
3 August 2024 1	Neftçi	0–0	Turan Tovuz	Baku
18:30 AZT (UTC+4)	Matias (yellow card) 9'	Report	Aliyev (yellow card) 42'; Hajiyev (yellow card) 57'	Stadium: Neftçi Arena; Attendance: 4,500; Referee: Əliyar Ağayev

10 August 2024 2	Sabail	1–1	Neftçi	Baku
21:00 AZT (UTC+4)	Çelik (yellow card) 9'; Larrucea (yellow card) 27'; Bouali (yellow card) 37'; Lytvyn 48' (yellow card) 49'; Sofir (yellow card) 90+2'	Report	Matias 24'; Sheydayev (yellow card) 59'; Haghverdi (yellow card) 90+5'; Lebon (yellow card) 90+6'	Stadium: Bayil Arena; Attendance: 1,200; Referee: Kamal Umudlu

18 August 2024 3	Neftçi	0–2	Sabah	Baku
20:30 AZT (UTC+4)	Kuč (yellow card) 40'; Shinyashiki (yellow card) 71'; Safarov (yellow card) 90+4'	Report	Seydiyev 54'; Mickels 76'	Stadium: Dalga Arena; Attendance: 800; Referee: Tural Qurbanov

24 August 2024 4	Araz-Naxçıvan	1–1	Neftçi	Baku
20:30 AZT (UTC+4)	Buludov 16' (yellow card) 79'; Kuzmanović (yellow card) 26'; Ribeiro (yellow card) 41'; Abdullayev (yellow card) 81'	Report	Kuč (yellow card) 38'; Seck (yellow card) 70'; Koffi (yellow card) 72'; Safarov (yellow card) 75'; Lebon (yellow card) 79'; Sheydayev 90+4'; Jafarov (yellow card) 90+5'	Stadium: Dalga Arena; Attendance: 450; Referee: İnqilab Məmmədov

31 August 2024 5	Shamakhi	0–0	Neftçi	Shamakhi
17:00 AZT (UTC+4)	Konaté (yellow card) 23'; Muradov (yellow card) 77'	Report		Stadium: City Stadium; Attendance: 1,700; Referee: Əliyar Ağayev

15 September 2024 6	Zira	2–0	Neftçi	Zirə
18:00 AZT (UTC+4)	Soumah 1'; Utzig 60' (yellow card) 80'; Zebli (yellow card) 76'	Report	Seck (yellow card) 90'	Stadium: Zira Olympic Sport Complex Stadium; Attendance: 800; Referee: Elçin Məsiyev

20 September 2024 7	Qarabağ	4–0	Neftçi	Baku
20:00 AZT (UTC+4)	Bauer 18' (o.g.); Juninho 29'; Silva (yellow card) 44'; Benzia 45+2'; Romão (yellow card) 84'; L.Andrade 90+1'	Report		Stadium: Azersun Arena; Attendance: 3,000; Referee: Əliyar Ağayev

28 September 2024 8	Neftçi	1–1	Sumgayit	Baku
19:30 AZT (UTC+4)	Lebon (yellow card) 27'; Matias 76'; Safarov (yellow card) 88'	Report	Taşqın (yellow card) 29'; Kahat (yellow card) 64'; Rezabala (yellow card) 64' (goal) 70'; Alan (yellow card) 86'; Mustafayev (yellow card) 89'; Badalov (yellow card) 90+3'	Stadium: Neftçi Arena; Attendance: 3,899; Referee: Cavid Cəlilov

4 October 2024 9	Kapaz	4–3	Neftçi	Tovuz
17:00 AZT (UTC+4)	Aliyev 24', 32'; Ba 41'; Braga 48'; A.Samadov (yellow card) 89'; Rógerio (yellow card) 90+3'	Report	Koffi 4'; Sheydayev 31'; Matias (yellow card) 38'; Salyanski 90+5'	Stadium: City Stadium; Attendance: 500; Referee: Rəşad Əhmədov

19 October 2024 10	Neftçi	3–1	Sabail	Baku
18:00 AZT (UTC+4)	Sheydayev 45+3'; Darboe 58', 67'; Kuč (red card) 81'	Report	Abdullayev 90+3'	Stadium: Neftçi Arena; Attendance: 1,365; Referee: Rauf Cabarov

27 October 2024 11	Sabah	0–0	Neftçi	Masazir
17:00 AZT (UTC+4)	Mickels (yellow card) 66'; Khaybulayev (yellow card) 77'; Seyidov (yellow card) 83'	Report	Guzzo (yellow card) 33'; Matias (yellow card) 79'; Conteh (yellow card) 90+3'	Stadium: Bank Respublika Arena; Attendance: 2,001; Referee: Tural Qurbanov

1 November 2024 12	Neftçi	0–1	Araz-Naxçıvan	Baku
20:30 AZT (UTC+4)	Safarov (yellow card) 90+2'	Report	Santos 30' (yellow card) 40'; Benny (yellow card) 86'; Valizade (yellow card) 86' (yellow-red card) 90+3'	Stadium: Neftçi Arena; Attendance: 1,324; Referee: Rəşad Əhmədov

8 November 2024 13	Neftçi	2–2	Shamakhi	Baku
15:00 AZT (UTC+4)	Darboe 1'; Mammadov 3'; Mahmudov (yellow card) 20'; Lebon (yellow card) 41'	Report	Kantaria (yellow card) 15'; Konaté 29'; Mickels 43'; Muradov (yellow card) 63'; Pusi (yellow card) 77'	Stadium: Neftçi Arena; Attendance: 1,100; Referee: Rəvan Həmzəzadə

23 November 2024 14	Neftçi	2–1	Zira	Baku
19:00 AZT (UTC+4)	Guzzo (yellow card) 22'; Ozobić 28'; Safarov 68'; Kuč (yellow card) 78'	Report	Djibrilla 51'; Alıyev (yellow card) 79'	Stadium: Neftçi Arena; Attendance: 1,174; Referee: Kamal Umudlu

1 December 2024 15	Neftçi	0–3	Qarabağ	Baku
19:00 AZT (UTC+4)	Kuč (yellow card) 8'; Matias (yellow card) 74'	Report	L.Andrade 27', 55' (yellow card) 28'; Cafarguliyev (yellow card) 34'; Akhundzade 53'; Benzia (yellow card) 72'	Stadium: Neftçi Arena; Attendance: 7,069; Referee: Əliyar Ağayev

8 December 2024 16	Sumgayit	2–0	Neftçi	Sumgait
18:00 AZT (UTC+4)	Guliyev 20' (yellow card) 37'; Rezabala 43'; Badalov (yellow card) 53'; Muradov (yellow card) 64'	Report	Safarov (yellow card) 43'	Stadium: City Stadium; Attendance: 2,000; Referee: Fərid Hacıyev

15 December 2024 17	Neftçi	2–1	Kapaz	Baku
18:30 AZT (UTC+4)	Bogomolsky 4'; Ozobić 22'; Haghverdi (yellow card) 36'; Kuč (yellow card) 53'	Report	Paná (yellow card) 42'; Aliyev (yellow card) 69' (goal) 77'	Stadium: Neftçi Arena; Attendance: 700; Referee: Cavid Cəlilov

21 December 2024 18	Turan Tovuz	1–1	Neftçi	Tovuz
16:00 AZT (UTC+4)	Ghaderi (yellow card) 30'; Yusifli (yellow card) 45+2'; Souza 54' (yellow card) 75'; Aliyev (yellow card) 90+4'	Report	Ozobić 45'; Haghverdi (yellow card) 85'; Safarov (yellow card) 89'; Matias (yellow card) 90+1'	Stadium: City Stadium; Attendance: 3,000; Referee: İnqilab Məmmədov

19 January 2025 19	Neftçi	1–1	Sabah	Baku
18:30 AZT (UTC+4)	Seck (yellow card) 54'; Matias (yellow card) 66'; Shtohrin 79'; Ohori (yellow card) 90+4'	Report	Chakla (yellow card) 39'; Salahlı 77' (o.g.)	Stadium: Neftçi Arena; Attendance: 1,500; Referee: Kamal Umudlu

26 January 2025 20	Araz-Naxçıvan	2–1	Neftçi	Baku
16:00 AZT (UTC+4)	Wanderson 29'; Qarayev (yellow card) 44'; Ramon 64'; Santos (yellow card) 73'; Paro (yellow card) 90+4'	Report	Bogomolsky (yellow card) 20'; Ozobić 68'; Sheydayev (yellow card) 73'	Stadium: Dalga Arena; Attendance: 400; Referee: Rauf Cabarov

31 January 2025 21	Neftçi	1–0	Shamakhi	Baku
18:30 AZT (UTC+4)	Salyanski (yellow card) 45'; Mahmudov 45+4' (pen.)	Report	Msanga (yellow card) 21'; Veremieiev (yellow card) 63'; Hüseynov (yellow card) 79'; Konaté (yellow card) 82'; Maharramli (yellow card) 90+2'	Stadium: Neftçi Arena; Attendance: 1,200; Referee: Rəşad Əhmədov

10 February 2025 22	Zira	1–2	Neftçi	Zirə
19:00 AZT (UTC+4)	Gomis (yellow card) 52'; Renato 90+1' (yellow card) 90+3'	Report	Salahlı (yellow card) 18'; Mahmudov 88'; Koffi 90+3'	Stadium: Zira Olympic Sport Complex Stadium; Attendance: 1,000; Referee: Əliyar Ağayev

16 February 2025 23	Neftçi	0–1	Qarabağ	Baku
19:00 AZT (UTC+4)	Kuč (yellow card) 23'; Matias (yellow card) 90'	Report	Zoubir (yellow card) 14'; Medina (red card) 22'; Magomedaliyev (yellow card) 28'; Kady (yellow card) 76'; Janković 89' (pen.); Xhixha (yellow card) 90'	Stadium: Neftçi Arena; Attendance: 9,355; Referee: Rəvan Həmzəzadə

21 February 2025 24	Neftçi	1–0	Sumgayit	Baku
19:00 AZT (UTC+4)	Ozobić 90+3' (pen.)	Report	Kahat (yellow card) 35'; Jaloliddinov (yellow card) 41'; Abdullazade (yellow card) 90+5'	Stadium: Neftçi Arena; Attendance: 200; Referee: Tural Qurbanov

5 February 2025 25	Kapaz	1–0	Neftçi	Tovuz
17:00 AZT (UTC+4)	Mabatshoev 50'	Report	Matias (yellow card) 19'; Ozobić (yellow card) 65'; Mahmudov (yellow card) 72'	Stadium: City Stadium; Attendance: 750; Referee: Cavid Cəlilov

10 March 2025 26	Neftçi	1–1	Turan Tovuz	Baku
19:30 AZT (UTC+4)	Haghverdi (yellow card) 77'; Camalov (yellow card) 80'; Sambou 88'	Report	Hackman (red card) 18'; Serrano (yellow card) 67'; Hurtado 90+5'	Stadium: Neftçi Arena; Attendance: 1,200; Referee: Rəvan Həmzəzadə

16 March 2025 27	Sabail	1–2	Neftçi	Baku
16:00 AZT (UTC+4)	Abdullazade (yellow card) 38' (goal) 44'; Muradov (yellow card) 68'	Report	Ozobić 17'; Camalov 29'	Stadium: Bayil Arena; Attendance: 600; Referee: Elçin Məsiyev

29 March 2025 28	Neftçi	1–1	Araz-Naxçıvan	Baku
15:45 AZT (UTC+4)	Sambou 3'; Kuč (yellow card) 5'; Matias (yellow card) 40'; Camalov (yellow card) 53'; Haghverdi (yellow card) 77'	Report	Paro 7'; Wanderson (yellow card) 22'; Abdullayev (yellow card) 82'; Ribeiro (yellow card) 90+3'	Stadium: Neftçi Arena; Attendance: 1,000; Referee: İnqilab Məmmədov

7 April 2025 29	Shamakhi	0–2	Neftçi	Shamakhi
15:30 AZT (UTC+4)	Msanga (yellow card) 62'; Konaté (yellow card) 83'	Report	Sheydayev 42' (pen.); Ozobić 89'	Stadium: City Stadium; Attendance: 1,500; Referee: Fərid Hacıyev

13 April 2025 30	Neftçi	2–4	Zira	Baku
19:15 AZT (UTC+4)	Ozobić 9'; Kuč 24'; Matias (yellow card) 45'; Salahlı (yellow card) 56'; Fernandes (yellow card) 87'	Report	Utzig 43' (pen.), 75' (pen.); Ruan (yellow card) 44'; Volkovi 61'; Acka (yellow card) 75'; Nuriyev 77'	Stadium: Neftçi Arena; Attendance: 1,731; Referee: Rəşad Əhmədov

19 April 2025 31	Qarabağ	3–0	Neftçi	Baku
20:00 AZT (UTC+4)	Kady (yellow card) 13'; Zoubir (yellow card) 22'; Benzia 40' (pen.); Akhundzade 41'	Report	Guzzo (yellow card) 44'; Ozobić (yellow card) 54'	Stadium: Republican Stadium; Attendance: 7,200; Referee: Elçin Məsiyev

28 April 2025 32	Sumgayit	2–2	Neftçi	Sumgait
20:00 AZT (UTC+4)	Abdikholikov 22'; Vásquez 52'; Mossi (yellow card) 71'; Kharaishvili (yellow card) 90+4'; Mustafayev (yellow card) 90+4'	Report	Sambou 60'; Shtohrin 87'; Seck (yellow card) 90+3'; Ozobić (yellow card) 90+4'; Camalov (yellow card) 90+4'	Stadium: City Stadium; Attendance: 1,400; Referee: Fərid Hacıyev

4 May 2025 33	Neftçi	2–2	Kapaz	Baku
20:00 AZT (UTC+4)	Fernandes 24'; Camalov (yellow card) 36' (red card) 70'; Mahmudov 90+3' (pen.)	Report	Pachu 50' (yellow card) 89'; Jafarov 63'	Stadium: Neftçi Arena; Attendance: 850; Referee: Rauf Cabarov

10 May 2025 34	Turan Tovuz	1–2	Neftçi	Tovuz
19:30 AZT (UTC+4)	Sadykhov 16'; Hackman (yellow card) 64'; Rzayev (yellow card) 90+2'	Report	Mahmudov 10'; Darboe 33'; Koffi (yellow card) 63'; Salahlı (yellow card) 64'; Jafarov (yellow card) 90+4'	Stadium: City Stadium; Attendance: 4,500; Referee: Rəşad Əhmədov

18 May 2025 35	Neftçi	3–0	Sabail	Baku
17:00 AZT (UTC+4)	Darboe 1'; Salyanski 25'; Müshtabazada 79' (o.g.)	Report	Rustamov (yellow card) 35'; Şirəliyev (yellow card) 46'	Stadium: Neftçi Arena; Attendance: 800; Referee: Nicat İsmayıllı

24 May 2025 36	Sabah	1–0	Neftçi	Masazır
19:30 AZT (UTC+4)	Chakla (yellow card) 50'; Sekidika 64'	Report	Kuč (yellow card) 76'	Stadium: Bank Respublika Arena; Attendance: 1,000; Referee: Tural Qurbanov

=== Azerbaijan Cup ===
4 December 2024 Last 16	Neftçi	6–0	Difai Agsu	Baku
18:00 AZT (UTC+4)	Bogomolsky 21', 67' (yellow card) 46'; Mammadov 25' (pen.); Matias 27'; Salyanski 57'; Shtohrin 63'	Report	Atakişiyev (yellow card) 55'	Stadium: Neftçi Arena; Attendance: 300; Referee: Elvin Bayramov

5 February 2025 Quarter-final 1st leg	Kapaz	0–2	Neftçi	Tovuz
16:00 AZT (UTC+4)	Hüseynli (yellow card) 90+2'	Report	Ozobić (yellow card) 30'; Salyanski 36'; Mahmudov (yellow card) 48'; Matias 69'; Jafarov (yellow card) 90+1'	Stadium: City Stadium; Attendance: 500; Referee: İnqilab Məmmədov

28 February 2025 Quarter-final 2nd leg	Neftçi	1–0 (3–0 agg.)	Kapaz	Baku
19:30 AZT (UTC+4)	Sambou 27' (red card) 58'	Report	Qirtimov (yellow card) 30'; Shahverdiyev (yellow card) 90'	Stadium: Neftçi Arena; Attendance: 650; Referee: Rəşad Əhmədov

2 April 2025 Semi-final 1st leg	Neftçi	1–2	Sabah	Baku
19:30 AZT (UTC+4)	Matias (penalty missed) 21' 21'; Seck (yellow card) 37'; Darboe (yellow card) 82'	Report	Salahlı 11' (o.g.); Mutallimov (yellow card) 29'; Šafranko 52'	Stadium: Neftçi Arena; Attendance: 2,934; Referee: Əliyar Ağayev

23 April 2025 Semi-final 2nd leg	Sabah	1–1 (3–2 agg.)	Neftçi	Masazır
21:00 AZT (UTC+4)	Sekidika 23'; Mickels (yellow card) 63'; Lepinjica (yellow card) 72'	Report	Matias (yellow card) 33'; Mahmudov 40'	Stadium: Bank Respublika Arena; Attendance: 6,600; Referee: İnqilab Məmmədov

== Squad statistics ==
As of match played 24 May 2025

=== Appearances and goals ===
No.	Pos	Nat	Player	Total		Premier League		Azerbaijan Cup	
No.	Pos	Nat	Player	Apps	Goals	Apps	Goals	Apps	Goals
1	GK	(Azerbaijan) AZE	Emil Balayev	6	0	5	0	1	0
3	DF	(Azerbaijan) AZE	Hojjat Haghverdi	30	0	26	0	4	0
4	MF	(Azerbaijan) AZE	Elvin Camalov	16	1	13	1	3	0
6	MF	(Portugal) POR	Raphael Guzzo	15	0	12+3	0	0	0
7	MF	(Azerbaijan) AZE	Azer Aliyev	12	0	4+6	0	1+1	0
8	MF	(Azerbaijan) AZE	Emin Mahmudov	27	4	19+4	3	3+1	1
9	FW	(Germany) GER	Bassala Sambou	14	4	8+5	3	1	1
10	MF	(Azerbaijan) AZE	Filip Ozobić	33	8	22+7	8	2+2	0
11	FW	(Brazil) BRA	Alex Fernandes	16	1	8+5	1	2+1	0
13	FW	(Azerbaijan) AZE	Emil Safarov	25	1	12+11	1	1+1	0
14	MF	(Montenegro) MNE	Edvin Kuč	32	1	25+3	1	3+1	0
17	MF	(Azerbaijan) AZE	Rahman Hajiyev	22	0	6+14	0	1+1	0
18	MF	(Japan) JPN	Ryonosuke Ohori	11	0	4+4	0	2+1	0
19	DF	(Azerbaijan) AZE	Azər Salahlı	22	0	15+3	0	3+1	0
20	MF	(Sierra Leone) SLE	Alpha Conteh	10	1	3+5	0	1+1	1
22	FW	(The Gambia) GAM	Dembo Darboe	19	5	12+4	5	1+2	0
23	DF	(Germany) GER	Robert Bauer	15	0	15	0	0	0
24	DF	(Senegal) SEN	Moustapha Seck	31	0	26+1	0	4	0
44	DF	(Brazil) BRA	Yuri Matias	33	5	28	2	5	3
47	MF	(Azerbaijan) AZE	Murad Mammadov	22	1	4+14	1	1+3	0
77	FW	(Belarus) BLR	Yegor Bogomolsky	14	3	5+7	1	1+1	2
78	MF	(Azerbaijan) AZE	Elcan Abilov	2	0	0+2	0	0	0
88	MF	(Ukraine) UKR	Andriy Shtohrin	29	3	13+14	2	2	1
90	FW	(Azerbaijan) AZE	Ramil Sheydayev	31	4	19+8	4	1+3	0
91	FW	(Azerbaijan) AZE	Agadadash Salyanski	23	4	10+8	2	3+2	2
93	GK	(Azerbaijan) AZE	Rza Jafarov	35	0	31	0	4	0
99	DF	(Ivory Coast) CIV	Erwin Koffi	38	2	31+3	2	4	0
Players away on loan:
Players who left Neftçi during the season:
4	DF	(Hungary) HUN	Márk Tamás	8	0	6+1	0	1	0
9	FW	(Brazil) BRA	Andre Shinyashiki	6	0	3+3	0	0	0
11	FW	(Collectivity of Saint Martin) SMN	Keelan Lebon	16	0	11+5	0	0	0

=== Goal scorers ===
Place	Position	Nation	Number	Name	Premier League	Azerbaijan Cup	Total
1	MF	(Azerbaijan)	10	Filip Ozobić	8	0	8
2	FW	(The Gambia)	22	Dembo Darboe	5	0	5
2	MF	(Azerbaijan)	8	Emin Mahmudov	4	1	5
2	DF	(Brazil)	44	Yuri Matias	2	3	5
5	FW	(Azerbaijan)	90	Ramil Sheydayev	4	0	4
5	FW	(Germany)	9	Bassala Sambou	3	1	4
5	FW	(Azerbaijan)	91	Agadadash Salyanski	2	2	4
8	MF	(Ukraine)	88	Andriy Shtohrin	2	1	3
8	FW	(Belarus)	77	Yegor Bogomolsky	1	2	3
10	DF	(Ivory Coast)	99	Erwin Koffi	2	0	2
10	MF	(Azerbaijan)	47	Murad Mammadov	1	1	2
12	FW	(Azerbaijan)	13	Emil Safarov	1	0	1
12	MF	(Azerbaijan)	4	Elvin Camalov	1	0	1
12	MF	(Montenegro)	14	Edvin Kuč	1	0	1
12	FW	(Brazil)	11	Alex Fernandes	1	0	1
12				Own goal	1	0	1
				TOTALS	39	11	50

=== Clean sheets ===
Place	Position	Nation	Number	Name	Premier League	Azerbaijan Cup	Total
1	GK	(Azerbaijan)	93	Rza Jafarov	5	2	7
2	GK	(Azerbaijan)	1	Emil Balayev	2	1	3
				TOTALS	7	3	10

=== Disciplinary record ===
Number	Nation	Position	Name	Premier League		Azerbaijan Cup		Total	
Number	Nation	Position	Name	Booked	Sent off (straight red)	Booked	Sent off (straight red)	Booked	Sent off (straight red)
3	(Azerbaijan)	DF	Hojjat Haghverdi	5	0	0	0	5	0
4	(Azerbaijan)	MF	Elvin Camalov	4	1	0	0	4	1
6	(Portugal)	MF	Raphael Guzzo	3	0	0	0	3	0
8	(Azerbaijan)	MF	Emin Mahmudov	2	0	0	0	2	0
9	(Germany)	FW	Bassala Sambou	0	0	0	1	0	1
10	(Azerbaijan)	MF	Filip Ozobić	3	0	1	0	4	0
11	(Brazil)	FW	Alex Fernandes	1	0	0	0	1	0
13	(Azerbaijan)	FW	Emil Safarov	6	0	0	0	6	0
14	(Montenegro)	MF	Edvin Kuč	8	1	0	0	8	1
18	(Japan)	MF	Ryonosuke Ohori	1	0	0	0	1	0
19	(Azerbaijan)	DF	Azər Salahlı	3	0	0	0	3	0
20	(Sierra Leone)	MF	Alpha Conteh	1	0	0	0	1	0
22	(The Gambia)	FW	Dembo Darboe	0	0	1	0	1	0
24	(Senegal)	DF	Moustapha Seck	4	0	1	0	5	0
44	(Brazil)	DF	Yuri Matias	10	0	1	0	11	0
47	(Azerbaijan)	MF	Murad Mammadov	0	0	1	0	1	0
77	(Belarus)	FW	Yegor Bogomolsky	1	0	1	0	2	0
90	(Azerbaijan)	FW	Ramil Sheydayev	2	0	0	0	2	0
91	(Azerbaijan)	FW	Agadadash Salyanski	1	0	0	0	1	0
93	(Azerbaijan)	GK	Rza Jafarov	2	0	1	0	3	0
99	(Ivory Coast)	DF	Erwin Koffi	2	0	0	0	2	0
Players away on loan:
Players who left Neftçi during the season:
9	(Brazil)	FW	Andre Shinyashiki	1	0	0	0	1	0
11	(Collectivity of Saint Martin)	FW	Keelan Lebon	4	0	0	0	4	0
			TOTALS	64	3	7	0	71	3
