= Jafarov =

Jafarov (masculine, Azerbaijani: Cəfərov, "(son) of Cəfər"; Russian: Джафаров) and Jafarova (feminine) is an Azerbaijani surname. Its russified form is Dzhafarov. The surname may refer to the following notable people:

== Jafarov ==
- Aghashirin Jafarov (1906–1984), Azerbaijani Red Army starshina
- Asaf Jafarov (1927–2000), Azerbaijani landscape painter
- Elnur Jafarov (born 1997), Azerbaijani footballer
- Galib Jafarov (born 1978), Kazakh boxer of Azerbaijani descent
- Kamal Jafarov
- Mammad Yusif Jafarov (1885–1938), Azerbaijani statesman
- Rasul Jafarov (born 1984), Azerbaijani lawyer and prominent human rights defender
- Rza Jafarov (born 2003), Azerbaijani football player
- Saidjamshid Jafarov
- Vagif Jafarov (1949–1991), Azerbaijani politician
- Zaur Jafarov

== Jafarova ==
- Matanat Jafarova (born 1986), Azerbaijani former footballer
- Nazrin Jafarova (born 1997), Azerbaijani tennis player

== See also ==
- Cəfərli (disambiguation)
- Ja'far
- Japarov
- Zhaparov
- Al-Ja'fari
