= 2023–24 Neftçi PFK season =

Neftçi
2023–24 season
- Manager: Adrian Mutu (until 24 December); Miodrag Božović (from 24 December)
- Stadium: Bakcell Arena
- Premier League: 5th
- Azerbaijan Cup: Semifinal vs Qarabağ
- Europa Conference League: Third qualifying round vs Beşiktaş
- Top goalscorer: League: Rahman Hajiyev (7); Filip Ozobić (7); All: Rahman Hajiyev (8); Filip Ozobić (8)

The Neftçi 2023–24 season was Neftçi's 32nd Azerbaijan Premier League season. Neftchi will compete in the Azerbaijan Premier League, the Azerbaijan Cup and the UEFA Europa Conference League.

== Season overview ==
On 5 June, Neftçi signed a new two-year contract with Ivan Brkić.

On 21 June, Neftçi announced the departure of head coach Laurențiu Reghecampf by mutual agreement.

On 28 June, Neftçi announced the signing of Emil Balayev from Sabail to a two-year contract.

On 30 June, Neftçi announced the signing of Filip Ozobić to a two-year contract after he'd left Qarabağ at the end of his contract.

On 6 July, Neftçi signed a new contract with Emin Mahmudov until the summer of 2025, with the option of an additional year.

On 11 July, Neftçi announced the appointment of Adrian Mutu as their new head coach.

On 16 July, Neftçi terminated their contract with Solomon Kvirkvelia by mutual agreement.

On 18 July, Neftçi announced the signing of Yuri Matias to a two-year contract from CFR Cluj.

On 23 July, Neftçi announced the signing of Márk Tamás to a two-year contract from Sepsi OSK.

On 24 July, Neftçi announced the signing of Qara Qarayev to a two-year contract, with the option of a third, from Qarabağ. The following day, 25 July, Neftçi signed Ivorian winger Erwin Koffi to a two-year contract from Pau.

On 25 July, Neftçi released a statement confirming that Saldanha, with the whom the club had a valid loan contract with through to January 2024, had left the club after failing to turn up for training in order to push through a move to Partizan.

On 1 August, Neftçi announced the signing of Andre Shinyashiki from Charlotte FC on a two-year contract.

On 9 August, Neftçi announced the signing of Aaron Olanare from Erzurumspor to a one-year contract.

On 28 August, Neftçi announced the signing of Mudo Valdez from Guaraní to a one-year contract, with the option of an additional year.

On 6 September, Neftçi announced the signing of Reziuan Mirzov from Khimki to a one-year contract. Later on 6 September, Neftçi announced the signing of Lucas Melano from Sarmiento. On 13 September, Neftçi confirmed the signing of Melano to a one-year contract with the option of an additional year.

On 24 December, Adrian Mutu left his role as head coach of Neftçi after his contract was terminated by mutual agreement, with Miodrag Božović being announced the club's new head coach later the same day.

On 6 January, Aaron Olanare was released from his contract with Neftçi.

On 16 January, Neftçi announced the signing of Alpha Conteh from Lokomotiv Plovdiv, to a 2.5-year contract.

On 19 January, Ismayil Zulfugarli and Farid Yusifli joined Turan Tovuz on loan for the rest of the season.

On 21 January, Neftçi announced the signing of Brayan Moreno from CSKA Sofia, to a 1.5-year contract.

On 26 May, a day after their season finished, Neftçi announced that they would not be extending their contract with Miodrag Božović.

== Squad ==
As of match played 25 May 2024

No.	Name	Nationality	Position	Date of birth (age)	Signed from	Signed in	Contract ends	Apps.	Goals
Goalkeepers
1	Ivan Brkić	(Croatia)	GK	29 June 1995 (aged 28)	Riga	2022	2025	68	0
12	Emil Balayev	(Azerbaijan)	GK	17 April 1994 (aged 30)	Sabail	2023	2025	12	0
30	Agil Mammadov	(Azerbaijan)	GK	1 May 1989 (aged 35)	Gabala	2019	2022	112	0
93	Rza Jafarov	(Azerbaijan)	GK	3 July 2003 (aged 20)	Academy	2022		28	0
94	Alirza Mustabazada	(Azerbaijan)	GK	5 December 2001 (aged 22)	Academy	2022		1	0
Defenders
3	Hojjat Haghverdi	(Azerbaijan)	DF	3 February 1993 (aged 31)	Sumgayit	2023	2024	47	0
4	Márk Tamás	(Hungary)	DF	28 October 1993 (aged 30)	Sepsi OSK	2023	2025	30	0
19	Azer Salahlı	(Azerbaijan)	DF	11 April 1994 (aged 30)	Keşla	2021	2024	79	2
26	Omar Buludov	(Azerbaijan)	DF	15 December 1998 (aged 25)	Academy	2016	2024	138	5
41	Samir Gasanov	(Russia)	DF	10 April 2003 (aged 21)	Academy	2022		0	0
44	Yuri Matias	(Brazil)	DF	10 February 1995 (aged 29)	CFR Cluj	2023	2025	37	5
82	Rufat Abbasov	(Azerbaijan)	DF	1 January 2005 (aged 19)	Academy	2021		2	0
Midfielders
2	Qara Qarayev	(Azerbaijan)	MF	12 October 1992 (aged 31)	Qarabağ	2023	2025 (+1)	28	1
6	Mudo Valdez	(Paraguay)	MF	14 November 1993 (aged 30)	Guaraní	2023	2024 (+1)	26	3
7	Azer Aliyev	(Azerbaijan)	MF	12 May 1994 (aged 30)	Ufa	2022	2025	56	2
8	Emin Mahmudov	(Azerbaijan)	MF	27 April 1992 (aged 32)	Boavista	2017	2025	229	56
10	Filip Ozobić	(Azerbaijan)	MF	8 April 1991 (aged 33)	Unattached	2023	2025	37	8
14	Eddy	(Azerbaijan)	MF	2 August 1992 (aged 31)	Unattached	2022	2024	71	7
17	Rahman Hajiyev	(Azerbaijan)	MF	25 July 1993 (aged 30)	Baku	2014	2024	223	26
23	Ataa Jaber	(Palestine)	MF	3 October 1994 (aged 29)	Ashdod	2022	2024	57	9
33	Turan Valizade	(Azerbaijan)	MF	1 January 2001 (aged 23)	Fenerbahçe	2019		2	0
99	Erwin Koffi	(Ivory Coast)	MF	10 January 1995 (aged 29)	Pau	2023	2025	36	1
Forwards
9	Andre Shinyashiki	(Brazil)	FW	11 June 1997 (aged 26)	Charlotte FC	2023	2025	30	4
11	Keelan Lebon	(Collectivity of Saint Martin)	FW	4 July 1997 (aged 26)	Astana	2023	2024	56	6
16	Lucas Melano	(Argentina)	FW	1 March 1993 (aged 31)	Sarmiento	2023	2024(+1)	11	0
20	Alpha Conteh	(Sierra Leone)	FW	1 May 2000 (aged 24)	Lokomotiv Plovdiv	2024	2026	13	0
22	Reziuan Mirzov	(Russia)	FW	22 June 1993 (aged 30)	Khimki	2023	2024	24	1
77	Yegor Bogomolsky	(Belarus)	FW	3 June 2000 (aged 23)	Minsk	2022	2025	66	8
88	Brayan Moreno	(Colombia)	FW	2 August 1999 (aged 24)	CSKA Sofia	2024	2025	18	4
91	Agadadash Salyanski	(Azerbaijan)	FW	19 June 2004 (aged 19)	Academy	2022		13	2
Away on loan
20	Vusal Asgarov	(Azerbaijan)	MF	23 August 2001 (aged 22)	Academy	2018		15	1
21	Ismayil Zulfugarli	(Azerbaijan)	MF	16 April 2001 (aged 23)	Academy	2019	2025	66	4
27	Farid Yusifli	(Azerbaijan)	MF	20 February 2002 (aged 22)	Academy	2019		38	0
56	Elton Alibayli	(Azerbaijan)	DF	4 February 2000 (aged 24)	Academy	2019		1	0
73	Ramin Nasirli	(Azerbaijan)	MF	24 September 2002 (aged 21)	Academy	2021		5	1
	Seymur Aliyev	(Azerbaijan)	MF	9 January 2000 (aged 24)	Academy	2020		0	0
	Khayal Najafov	(Azerbaijan)	MF	19 December 1997 (aged 26)	Sumgayit	2021		26	0
Left during the season
5	Kenny Saief	(United States)	MF	17 December 1993 (aged 30)	Anderlecht	2022	2024	59	10
9	Saldanha	(Brazil)	FW	19 August 1999 (aged 24)	on loan from JEF United Chiba	2023	2023	21	5
25	Aaron Olanare	(Nigeria)	FW	4 June 1994 (aged 29)	Erzurumspor	2023	2024	15	3
92	Omar Gurbanov	(Azerbaijan)	MF	6 April 2005 (aged 19)	Academy	2022		1	0
	Asim Alizade	(Azerbaijan)	MF	5 February 2000 (aged 24)	Academy	2020		1	0
	Elshad Taghiyev	(Azerbaijan)	MF	15 June 2001 (aged 22)	Sabail	2022		0	0

=== Out on loan ===
Note: Flags indicate national team as defined under FIFA eligibility rules; some limited exceptions apply. Players may hold more than one non-FIFA nationality.

No.	Pos.	Nation	Player
—	MF	AZE	Vusal Asgarov (at Iravan)
—	MF	AZE	Seymur Aliyev (at Iravan)

No.	Pos.	Nation	Player
—	MF	AZE	Khayal Najafov (at Turan Tovuz)

== Transfers ==
=== In ===
Date	Position	Nationality	Name	From	Fee	Ref.
28 June 2023	GK	(Azerbaijan)	Emil Balayev	Sabail	Undisclosed	
30 June 2023	MF	(Azerbaijan)	Filip Ozobić	Unattached	Free	
18 July 2023	DF	(Brazil)	Yuri Matias	CFR Cluj	Undisclosed	
23 July 2023	DF	(Hungary)	Márk Tamás	Sepsi OSK	Undisclosed	
24 July 2023	DF	(Azerbaijan)	Qara Qarayev	Qarabağ	Undisclosed	
25 July 2023	MF	(Ivory Coast)	Erwin Koffi	Pau	Undisclosed	
1 August 2023	FW	(Brazil)	Andre Shinyashiki	Charlotte FC	Undisclosed	
9 August 2023	FW	(Nigeria)	Aaron Olanare	Erzurumspor	Undisclosed	
28 August 2023	MF	(Paraguay)	Mudo Valdez	Guaraní	Undisclosed	
6 September 2023	FW	(Russia)	Reziuan Mirzov	Khimki	Undisclosed	
6 September 2023	FW	(Argentina)	Lucas Melano	Sarmiento	Undisclosed	
16 January 2024	FW	(Sierra Leone)	Alpha Conteh	Lokomotiv Plovdiv	Undisclosed	
21 January 2024	FW	(Colombia)	Brayan Moreno	CSKA Sofia	Undisclosed	

=== Loans in ===
Date from	Position	Nationality	Name	From	Date to	Ref.
26 January 2023	FW	(Brazil)	Saldanha	JEF United Chiba	25 July 2023	

=== Out ===
Date	Position	Nationality	Name	To	Fee	Ref.
6 September 2023	MF	(Azerbaijan)	Omar Gurbanov	Zira	Undisclosed	

=== Loans out ===
Date from	Position	Nationality	Name	To	Date to	Ref.
6 September 2023	MF	(Azerbaijan)	Vusal Asgarov	Iravan	30 June 2023	
6 September 2023	MF	(Azerbaijan)	Seymur Aliyev	Iravan	30 June 2023	
6 September 2023	MF	(Azerbaijan)	Khayal Najafov	Turan Tovuz	30 June 2023	
19 January 2024	DF	(Azerbaijan)	Ismayil Zulfugarli	Turan Tovuz	30 June 2023	
19 January 2024	MF	(Azerbaijan)	Farid Yusifli	Turan Tovuz	30 June 2023	

=== Released ===
Date	Position	Nationality	Name	Joined	Date	Ref
10 July 2023	DF	(Serbia)	Vojislav Stanković	Železničar Pančevo		
16 July 2023	DF	(Georgia (country))	Solomon Kvirkvelia	Al-Okhdood	16 July 2023	
6 September 2023	MF	(Azerbaijan)	Asim Alizade			
6 September 2023	MF	(Azerbaijan)	Elshad Taghiyev			
14 December 2023	MF	(United States)	Kenny Saief	Maccabi Haifa	19 December 2023	
6 January 2024	FW	(Nigeria)	Aaron Olanare	Molde	27 March 2024	
29 May 2024	DF	(Azerbaijan)	Omar Buludov	Araz-Naxçıvan	29 May 2024	
21 June 2024	MF	(Azerbaijan)	Eddy Pascual	Johor Darul Ta'zim	10 August 2024	
25 June 2024	FW	(Russia)	Reziuan Mirzov	Khimki	25 June 2024	
28 June 2024	GK	(Azerbaijan)	Agil Mammadov	Retired		
28 June 2024	MF	(Palestine)	Ataa Jaber	Qatar SC	4 October 2024	

== Friendlies ==
1 July 2023 Match TV Cup	Zenit St.Petersburg (Russia)	3–1	(Azerbaijan) Neftçi	Saint Petersburg, Russia
20:30 AZT (UTC+4)	Mantuan 47'; (yellow card) 57'; Claudinho 69'; Bakayev 79'	Report	Saldanha 39' (pen.)	Stadium: Krestovsky Stadium

8 July 2023 Match TV Cup	Neftçi (Azerbaijan)	0–4	(Serbia) Red Star Belgrade	Saint Petersburg, Russia
20:30 AZT (UTC+4)		Report	Ivanić 9'; Mitrović 17'; Bukari 45'; Šljivić 81'	Stadium: Petrovsky Stadium

15 July 2023 Match TV Cup	Neftçi (Azerbaijan)	0–1	(Turkey) Fenerbahçe	Saint Petersburg, Russia
15:00 AZT (UTC+4)		Report	Džeko 72'	Stadium: Petrovsky Stadium

18 July 2023 Friendly	Spartak Moscow (Russia)	2–0	(Azerbaijan) Neftçi	Moscow, Russia
22:00 AZT (UTC+4)	Melyoshin 34'; Promes 37'	Report		Stadium: Otkritie Arena

6 January 2024	Neftçi	1–3	Erzurumspor	Antalya, Turkey
AZT (UTC+4)	Hajiyev 10'	Report	Tozlu 58' (pen.); Özhan 76'; Sert 79'	Stadium: Gloria Sport Arena

13 January 2024	Neftçi	0–3	Waldhof Mannheim	Antalya, Turkey
16:00 AZT (UTC+4)		Report	Goden 9'; Bahn 36'; Herman 76'	Stadium: Gloria Sport Arena

== Competitions ==
=== Overview ===
Competition	First match	Last match	Starting round	Final position	Record							
Competition	First match	Last match	Starting round	Final position	Pld	W	D	L	GF	GA	GD	Win %
Premier League	6 August 2023	25 May 2024	Matchday 1	5th	36	16	8	12	51	40	+11	44.44
Azerbaijan Cup	21 December 2023	24 April 2024	Last 16	Semifinals	5	2	1	2	9	11	−2	40.00
Europa Conference League	27 July 2023	17 August 2023	Second qualifying round	Third qualifying round	4	1	1	2	6	7	−1	25.00
Total					45	19	10	16	66	58	+8	42.22

Last updated: 25 May 2024
Source: Competitions

=== Premier League ===
==== Results summary ====
Overall								Home						Away					
Pld	W	D	L	GF	GA	GD	Pts	W	D	L	GF	GA	GD	W	D	L	GF	GA	GD
36	16	8	12	51	40	+11	56	10	3	5	31	17	+14	6	5	7	20	23	−3

Last updated: 25 May 2024.
Source: See Results

==== Results by round ====
Round	1	2	3	4	5	6	7	8	9	10	11	12	13	14	15	16	17	18	19	20	21	22	23	24	25	26	27	28	29	30	31	32	33	34	35	36
Ground	A	H	A	H	A	A	A	A	H	A	H	A	H	H	H	H	A	H	A	H	A	A	H	A	H	A	H	A	H	H	A	H	A	H	A	H
Result	L	D	D	W	W	L	D	W	L	W	L	W	L	D	W	W	L	W	D	W	L	L	W	D	L	D	W	W	D	W	L	W	L	W	W	L
Position	7	8	8	5	3	6	6	5	5	5	5	6	6	6	6	3	5	3	4	2	3	3	3	3	3	4	3	2	3	2	4	3	5	3	2	5

Updated to match(es) played on 25 May 2024. Source: See Results
A = Away; H = Home; W = Win; D = Draw; L = Loss

==== Results ====
6 August 2023 1	Kapaz	1–0	Neftçi	Ganja
17:00 AZT (UTC+4)	Kvirkvia 44' (pen.); Rzayev (yellow card) 90'; Vasilyuchek (yellow card) 90+1'; Juninho (yellow card) 90+3'	Report	Salahlı (yellow card) 64'; Mahmudov (yellow card) 66'	Stadium: City Stadium; Referee: Tural Qurbanov

14 August 2023 2	Neftçi	1–1	Sabail	Baku
20:00 AZT (UTC+4)	Saief (yellow card) 40' (goal) 82' (pen.); Qarayev (yellow card) 74'; Zulfugarli (yellow card) 90+3'	Report	Lugasi (yellow card) 32'; Pedro Nuno 34' (yellow card) 74'; Mehremić (yellow card) 80'; Ahmadov (yellow card) 80'; Ağayev (yellow card) 85'	Stadium: Neftçi Arena; Referee: Rauf Jabarov

20 August 2023 3	Sabah	1–1	Neftçi	Masazır
20:00 AZT (UTC+4)	Letić 44' (yellow card) 90+4'; Thill (yellow card) 65'; Nuriyev (yellow card) 68'; Chakla (yellow card) 74'; Seydiyev (yellow card) 86'; Mutallimov (yellow card) 89'; Christian (yellow card) 90+3'	Report	Irazabal 49' (o.g.); Shinyashiki (yellow card) 74'; Matias (yellow card) 78'; Jaber (yellow card) 81'; Qarayev (yellow card) 89'; Mammadov (yellow card) 89'	Stadium: Bank Respublika Arena; Referee: Aliyar Aghayev

27 August 2023 4	Neftçi	2–0	Gabala	Baku
18:30 AZT (UTC+4)	Hajiyev 45+3'; Jafarov (red card) 70'; Matias 80'	Report	Áfrico (yellow card) 8'	Stadium: Neftçi Arena; Referee: Raad Ahmadov

2 September 2023 5	Sumgayit	0–1	Neftçi	Sumgait
20:30 AZT (UTC+4)		Report	Saief (yellow card) 8'; Matias (yellow card) 55'; Valdez 74'; Olanare (yellow card) 88'	Stadium: Kapital Bank Arena; Referee: Rauf Allahverdiyev

16 September 2023 6	Araz-Naxçıvan	1–0	Neftçi	Baku
18:00 AZT (UTC+4)	Abdullayev (yellow card) 47'; Kadiri (yellow card) 49' (yellow-red card) 86'; Aliyev 81' (pen.); Wanderson (yellow card) 87'; Azzaoui (yellow card) 90'	Report	Matias (yellow card) 8'; Brkić (yellow card) 81'; Mahmudov (yellow card) 87'	Stadium: Dalga Arena; Referee: Ingilab Mammadov

23 September 2023 7	Zira	1–1	Neftçi	Zirə
20:30 AZT (UTC+4)	Kuliyev (yellow card) 3'; Ibrahim (yellow card) 28'; Alıyev 44' (pen.); Muradov (yellow card) 74'	Report	Matias 22' (yellow card) 43'; Mahmudov (yellow card) 45'	Stadium: Zira Olympic Sport Complex Stadium; Referee: Ravan Hamzazada

30 September 2023 8	Turan Tovuz	0–1	Neftçi	Tovuz
16:00 AZT (UTC+4)	Rzayev (yellow card) 90+1'	Report	Haghverdi (yellow card) 84'; Olanare 87' (yellow card) 90+1'	Stadium: City Stadium; Referee: Emin Aliyev

8 October 2023 9	Neftçi	0–2	Qarabağ	Baku
19:30 AZT (UTC+4)	Mahmudov (yellow card) 45+1'; Valdez (yellow card) 68'; Melano (yellow card) 82'	Report	Juninho 47'; Romão (yellow card) 68'; Medvedev (yellow card) 72'; P.Andrade (yellow card) 78'; Xhixha 87'	Stadium: Neftçi Arena; Referee: Rashad Ahmadov

20 October 2023 10	Sabail	2–4	Neftçi	Baku
20:30 AZT (UTC+4)	Gomis 2'; Paná (yellow card) 32'; Nabiyev (yellow card) 45+3'; Ramalingom 81'	Report	Aliyev 12'; Jaber 45+3'; Matias (yellow card) 83' (goal) 88'; Tamás (yellow card) 90+1'; Hajiyev 90+5'	Stadium: Bayil Arena; Referee: Aliyar Ağayev

29 October 2023 11	Neftçi	0–1	Sabah	Baku
18:30 AZT (UTC+4)	Matias (yellow card) 58' (yellow-red card) 90+3'; Jaber (yellow card) 58'	Report	Chakla (yellow card) 25'; Apeh (yellow card) 31'; Ələsgərov (yellow card) 43'; Jamalov (yellow card) 57'; Letić 90+5'	Stadium: Neftçi Arena; Referee: Ravan Hamzazada

5 November 2023 12	Gabala	0–2	Neftçi	Qabala
16:00 AZT (UTC+4)	Hüseynli (yellow card) 23'; Abramov (yellow card) 52'; Áfrico (yellow card) 56'; Allach (yellow card) 69'	Report	Haghverdi (yellow card) 12'; Mirzov (yellow card) 16'; Tamás (yellow card) 36'; Valdez 60'; Brkić (yellow card) 90+2'; Hajiyev 90+4'	Stadium: City Stadium; Referee: Kamal Umudlu

11 November 2023 13	Neftçi	1–2	Sumgayit	Baku
16:30 AZT (UTC+4)	Aliyev (yellow card) 23'; Jaber 35'; Mirzov (yellow card) 39'; Valdez (yellow card) 51'; Matias (yellow card) 90+1'	Report	Kahat (yellow card) 17' (goal) 69'; Murata (yellow card) 48' (goal) 56'; Mustafayev (yellow card) 87'; Khachayev (yellow card) 90+1'	Stadium: Neftçi Arena; Referee: Rauf Jabarov

26 November 2023 14	Neftçi	1–1	Araz-Naxçıvan	Baku
15:30 AZT (UTC+4)	Matias 40' (yellow card) 65'; Mahmudov (yellow card) 56'	Report	Kurdić (yellow card) 45'; Rodrigues (yellow card) 47'; Wanderson (yellow card) 84'; O.Aliyev 90+3'	Stadium: Neftçi Arena; Referee: Farid Haciyev

3 December 2023 15	Neftçi	1–0	Zira	Baku
17:00 AZT (UTC+4)	Shinyashiki (yellow card) 45'; Hajiyev 60'	Report	Ruan (yellow card) 40'	Stadium: Neftçi Arena; Referee: Ingilab Mammadov

10 December 2023 16	Neftçi	3–2	Turan Tovuz	Baku
18:00 AZT (UTC+4)	Ozobić 5' (yellow card) 43'; Lebon (yellow card) 22'; Salahlı (yellow card) 47'; Hajiyev 56'; Olanare 73'	Report	Miller 9'; Serrano (yellow card) 22'; John 59'; Brunão (yellow card) 79'	Stadium: Neftçi Arena; Referee: Aliyar Ağayev

18 December 2023 17	Qarabağ	2–0	Neftçi	Baku
20:00 AZT (UTC+4)	Benzia 71'; Keyta 90+2'	Report		Stadium: Tofiq Bahramov Republican Stadium; Referee: Ravan Hamzazada

24 December 2023 18	Neftçi	2–0	Kapaz	Baku
16:00 AZT (UTC+4)	Salahlı 8'; Shinyashiki 71'	Report	Shahverdiyev (yellow card) 70'	Stadium: Neftçi Arena; Referee: Farid Haciyev

21 January 2024 19	Sabah	0–0	Neftçi	Masazır
16:00 AZT (UTC+4)	Hadhoudi (yellow card) 86'; Christian (yellow card) 86'	Report	Valdez (yellow card) 24'; Salahlı (yellow card) 48'; Ozobić (yellow card) 87'; Bogomolsky (yellow card) 88'	Stadium: Bank Respublika Arena; Referee: Aliyar Ağayev

28 January 2024 20	Neftçi	3–1	Gabala	Baku
17:30 AZT (UTC+4)	Salahlı (yellow card) 42'; Mahmudov 61' (pen.); Valdez 67'; Eddy (yellow card) 90+3'; Moreno 90+5' (yellow card) 90+6'	Report	Avramov (yellow card) 50'; Hüseynli (yellow card) 54'; Ochihava (yellow card) 55' (red card) 59'; Abbasov (yellow card) 60'; Safarov 87'; Allach (red card) 90+7'; Mammadov (yellow card) 90+7'	Stadium: Neftçi Arena; Referee: Ingilab Mammadov

4 February 2024 21	Sumgayit	2–1	Neftçi	Sumgait
15:00 AZT (UTC+4)	Ninga 8', 37' (yellow card) 90+6'; Octávio (yellow card) 39'; Kahat (yellow card) 90+8'	Report	Eddy (yellow card) 17'; Tamás (yellow card) 22'; Aliyev (yellow card) 65'; Ozobić 90+6' (pen.)	Stadium: Kapital Bank Arena; Referee: Elcin Masiyev

13 February 2024 22	Araz-Naxçıvan	1–0	Neftçi	Baku
19:30 AZT (UTC+4)	Bayramli (yellow card) 29'; Kadiri (yellow card) 39'; O.Aliyev 90+2' (pen.); Mustafayev (yellow card) 90+2'	Report	Conteh (yellow card) 56'; Qarayev (yellow card) 73'; Mirzov (yellow card) 82'; Jafarov (yellow card) 90+2'; Mahmudov (yellow card) 90+5'	Stadium: Dalga Arena; Referee: Raad Ahmadov

18 February 2024 23	Neftçi	1–0	Zira	Baku
18:00 AZT (UTC+4)	Koffi 11'; Lebon (yellow card) 17'	Report	Acka (yellow card) 74'	Stadium: Neftçi Arena; Referee: Aliyar Ağayev

24 February 2024 24	Turan Tovuz	1–1	Neftçi	Tovuz
15:00 AZT (UTC+4)	Guseynov (yellow card) 35'; Hajiyev (yellow card) 72'; Nabiyev 89'; Aliyev (yellow card) 89'	Report	Haghverdi (yellow card) 54'; Bogomolsky 72' (yellow card) 80'; Salahlı (yellow card) 90+4'	Stadium: City Stadium; Referee: Tural Qurbanov

3 March 2024 25	Neftçi	1–4	Qarabağ	Baku
19:00 AZT (UTC+4)	Salahlı (yellow card) 33'; Ozobić (yellow card) 36' (goal) 71' (pen.); Jafarov (yellow card) 58'; Matias (yellow card) 88'	Report	Janković (yellow card) 5'; Akhundzade 47'; Bayramov 60' (pen.), 90+3'; L.Andrade 90+7'	Stadium: Neftçi Arena; Referee: Elcin Məsiyev

9 March 2024 26	Kapaz	3–3	Neftçi	Ganja
15:00 AZT (UTC+4)	Júnior 6', 62'; Alijanov (yellow card) 42' (goal) 47'; Khvalko (yellow card) 77'	Report	Ozobić 32', 57', 77' (pen.); Salahlı (yellow card) 54'; Moreno (yellow card) 55'; Eddy (yellow card) 87'	Stadium: City Stadium; Referee: Ravan Hamzazada

15 March 2024 27	Neftçi	3–0	Sabail	Baku
19:00 AZT (UTC+4)	Bardea 24' (o.g.); Salahlı 27'; Eddy (yellow card) 45+1'; Bogomolsky 85'; Matias (yellow card) 90'	Report	Naghiyev (yellow card) 54'	Stadium: Neftçi Arena; Referee: Ingilab Mammadov

29 March 2024 28	Gabala	0–1	Neftçi	Qabala
15:30 AZT (UTC+4)	Isaiah (yellow card) 86'	Report	Shinyashiki (yellow card) 17'; Lebon 42'; Valdez (yellow card) 43'; Jaber (yellow card) 86'	Stadium: City Stadium; Referee: Javid Jalilov

7 April 2024 29	Neftçi	1–1	Sumgayit	Baku
20:00 AZT (UTC+4)	Mahmudov 74'; Haghverdi (yellow card) 90'; Ozobić (yellow card) 90'	Report	Matias 13' (o.g.); Abdullazade (yellow card) 37'; Suliman (yellow card) 57'; Rezabala (yellow card) 57'; Dzhenetov (yellow card) 90'	Stadium: Neftçi Arena; Referee: Elcin Masiyev

13 April 2024 30	Neftçi	3–0	Araz-Naxçıvan	Baku
19:00 AZT (UTC+4)	Moreno 1'; Hajiyev 45' (yellow card) 78'; Salahlı (yellow card) 56'; Bogomolsky (yellow card) 81'; Igor 87' (o.g.)	Report	Kadiri (yellow card) 69'; Bayramli (yellow card) 73'; Manafov (yellow card) 78'	Stadium: Neftçi Arena; Referee: Aliyar Ağayev

20 April 2024 31	Zira	3–1	Neftçi	Zirə
19:00 AZT (UTC+4)	Ibrahimli (yellow card) 36'; Sadykhov 43'; Nuriyev (yellow card) 59' (yellow-red card) 67'; Ruan (yellow card) 65'; Bayramov 79'; Kulach 84'; Ibrahim (yellow card) 84'	Report	Mahmudov 19' (pen.); Matias (yellow card) 35'; Bogomolsky (yellow card) 42'; Tamás (yellow card) 65'	Stadium: Zira Olympic Sport Complex Stadium; Referee: Ingilab Mammadov

28 April 2024 32	Neftçi	3–0	Turan Tovuz	Baku
17:45 AZT (UTC+4)	Ozobić 15' (yellow card) 23'; Matias 31' (pen.); Hajiyev (yellow card) 32' (goal) 70' (pen.); Eddy (yellow card) 81'	Report	Brunão (yellow card) 29' (red card) 63'; Alkhasov (yellow card) 69'	Stadium: Neftçi Arena; Referee: Ravan Hamzazada

4 May 2024 33	Qarabağ	5–0	Neftçi	Baku
19:30 AZT (UTC+4)	Akhundzade 13', 77'; Janković (yellow card) 40'; Bayramov 41'; Romão (yellow card) 45+3'; L.Andrade 65'; Zoubir 85'	Report	Moreno (yellow card) 34'; Valdez (yellow card) 62'; Matias (red card) 78'; Salahlı (yellow card) 89'	Stadium: Tofiq Bahramov Republican Stadium; Referee: Ingilab Məmmədov

10 May 2024 34	Neftçi	5–1	Kapaz	Baku
19:00 AZT (UTC+4)	Haghverdi (yellow card) 21'; Shinyashiki (yellow card) 35' (goal) 45', 47', 76'; Moreno 45+2'; Salyanski 86'; Ozobić (yellow card) 88'	Report	Niane (yellow card) 25'; Fall 36'; Seyidov (red card) 75'; Shahverdiyev (yellow card) 88'; Hüseynov (yellow card) 90+1'	Stadium: Neftçi Arena; Referee: Farid Haciyev

18 May 2024 35	Sabail	0–3	Neftçi	Baku
17:00 AZT (UTC+4)	Nuno (yellow card) 68'; Ramalingom (yellow card) 90+4'	Report	Haghverdi (yellow card) 55'; Lebon (yellow card) 61'; Moreno 69'; Jaber 77'; Qarayev 82'	Stadium: Bayil Arena; Referee: Tural Qurbanov

25 May 2024 36	Neftçi	0–1	Sabah	Baku
19:00 AZT (UTC+4)	Eddy (yellow card) 79'; Matias (yellow card) 82'; Valdez (red card) 90+1'	Report	Guliyev (yellow card) 2'; Aliyev (yellow card) 67'; Irazabal (yellow card) 70' (red card) 90+1'; Ələsgərov 87'; Parris (red card) 90+1'; Khaybulayev (red card) 90+1'; İmanov (yellow card) 90+3'	Stadium: Neftçi Arena; Referee: Aliyar Ağayev

==== League table ====
Pos	Team	Pld	W	D	L	GF	GA	GD	Pts	Qualification or relegation
3	Sabah	36	17	7	12	50	40	+10	58 (Note: Zira are ahead of Sabah on head-to-head points: Zira 1–0 Sabah, Sabah 0–1 Zira, Zira 0–1 Sabah, Sabah 0–1 Zira)	Qualification for the Conference League second qualifying round
4	Sumgayit	36	15	12	9	37	38	−1	57	Qualification for the Conference League second qualifying round
5	Neftçi	36	16	8	12	51	40	+11	56	
6	Turan Tovuz	36	13	9	14	53	53	0	48	
7	Sabail	36	11	9	16	50	60	−10	42	

Source: Soccerway
Rules for classification: 1) Points; 2) Head-to-head points; 3) Head-to-head goal difference; 4) Head-to-head goals scored; 5) Head-to-head away goals scored (only if two teams); 6) Goal difference; 7) Goals scored.

=== Azerbaijan Cup ===
21 December 2023 Last 16	Neftçi	4–0	Qaradağ Lökbatan	Baku
18:00 AZT (UTC+4)	Olanare 23' (pen.); Qayali 73' (o.g.); Bogomolsky 78'; Shinyashiki 81'; Valdez (yellow card) 90'	Report	Ismayilov (yellow card) 51'; Farajov (yellow card) 71'	Stadium: Neftçi Arena; Attendance: 662; Referee: Kamran Aliyev

31 January 2024 Quarterfinal 1st leg	Sumgayit	2–3	Neftçi	Sumgait
19:00 AZT (UTC+4)	Mossi (yellow card) 41'; Dzhenetov (yellow card) 45+2'; Badalov 60'; Aliyev (yellow card) 71'; Ninga 89'; Kahat (yellow card) 90+3'	Report	Eddy (yellow card) 27'; Bogomolsky 29'; Mahmudov 44' (pen.), 45+2'; Valdez (yellow card) 90+4'; Jafarov (yellow card) 90+5'	Stadium: Kapital Bank Arena; Attendance: 1,200; Referee: Raşad Ahmadov

9 February 2024 Quarterfinal 2nd leg	Neftçi	1–1 (4–3 agg.)	Sumgayit	Baku
19:00 AZT (UTC+4)	Ozobić 26'; Shinyashiki (yellow card) 32'; Qarayev (yellow card) 45+2'; Moreno (yellow card) 87'; Lebon (yellow card) 90+5'	Report	Dosso (yellow card) 30'; Kahat 39' (yellow card) 90+6'; Suliman (yellow card) 90'; Abdullazade (yellow card) 90+6'	Stadium: Neftçi Arena; Attendance: 1,000; Referee: Kamal Umudlu

2 April 2024 Semifinal 1st leg	Neftçi	0–4	Qarabağ	Baku
20:00 AZT (UTC+4)	Matias (yellow card) 13'; Valdez (yellow card) 31'; Mahmudov (yellow card) 64'; Eddy (yellow card) 65'	Report	Bayramov 14' (pen.), 29'; Romão (yellow card) 15'; Janković 38'; Benzia (yellow card) 65'; Akhundzade 86'	Stadium: Neftçi Arena; Attendance: 5,750; Referee: Ravan Hamzazade

24 April 2024 Semifinal 2nd leg	Qarabağ	4–1 (8–1 agg.)	Neftçi	Baku
20:00 AZT (UTC+4)	Juninho 16', 69'; Benzia (yellow card) 54'; Qarayev 62' (o.g.); Akhundzade 78'	Report	Conteh (yellow card) 42'; Mirzov 64'; Brkić (yellow card) 70'; Matias (yellow card) 74'	Stadium: Tofiq Bahramov Republican Stadium; Attendance: 3,000; Referee: Aliyar Agayev

=== Europa Conference League ===
==== Qualifying rounds ====
27 July 2023 Second qualifying round 1st leg	Željezničar (Bosnia and Herzegovina)	2–2	(Azerbaijan) Neftçi	Sarajevo, Bosnia and Herzegovina
23:00 AZT (UTC+4)	Haračić 14'; Biber (yellow card) 43'; Drina (yellow card) 45+1'; Ovčina (yellow card) 45+2'; Amoah 45+8'	Report	Kosorić 44' (o.g.); Saief (yellow card) 45+2'; Hajiyev 90+5'	Stadium: Stadion Grbavica; Attendance: 13,157; Referee: Juri Frischer (Estonia)

3 August 2023 Second qualifying round 2nd leg	Neftçi (Azerbaijan)	2–0 (4–2 agg.)	(Bosnia and Herzegovina) Željezničar	Baku, Azerbaijan
21:00 AZT (UTC+4)	Saief 20'; Matias (yellow card) 44'; Eddy 68'; Brkić (yellow card) 90+8'; Zulfugarli (yellow card) 90+10'	Report	Kosorić (yellow card) 44'; Rustemović (yellow card) 45'; Krpić (yellow card) 79'; Jašarević (yellow card) 90+10'	Stadium: Bakcell Arena; Attendance: 10,000; Referee: Balázs Berke (Hungary)

10 August 2023 Third qualifying round 1st leg	Neftçi (Azerbaijan)	1–3	(Turkey) Beşiktaş	Baku, Azerbaijan
21:00 AZT (UTC+4)	Jaber (yellow card) 56'; Saief (yellow card) 76'; Lebon 79'; Mahmudov (yellow card) 84'	Report	Aboubakar 14'; Muleka 23'; Uçan 62'; Rosier (yellow card) 87'	Stadium: Bakcell Arena; Attendance: 11,000; Referee: Lukas Fähndrich (Switzerland)

17 August 2023 Third qualifying round 2nd leg	Beşiktaş (Turkey)	2–1 (5–2 agg.)	(Azerbaijan) Neftçi	Istanbul, Turkey
21:00 AZT (UTC+4)	Aboubakar 57'; Muleka 71'	Report	Mahmudov 36'	Stadium: Beşiktaş Stadium; Attendance: 21,890; Referee: Julian Weinberger (Austria)

== Squad statistics ==
As of match played 25 May 2024

=== Appearances and goals ===
No.	Pos	Nat	Player	Total		Premier League		Azerbaijan Cup		Europa Conference League	
No.	Pos	Nat	Player	Apps	Goals	Apps	Goals	Apps	Goals	Apps	Goals
1	GK	(Croatia) CRO	Ivan Brkić	18	0	12+1	0	1	0	4	0
2	DF	(Azerbaijan) AZE	Qara Qarayev	28	1	16+9	1	2+1	0	0	0
3	DF	(Azerbaijan) AZE	Hojjat Haghverdi	28	0	20+4	0	3+1	0	0	0
4	DF	(Hungary) HUN	Márk Tamás	31	0	24	0	3	0	4	0
6	MF	(Paraguay) PAR	Mudo Valdez	27	3	10+13	3	4	0	0	0
7	MF	(Azerbaijan) AZE	Azer Aliyev	18	1	12+1	1	1+2	0	2	0
8	MF	(Azerbaijan) AZE	Emin Mahmudov	38	6	27+3	3	2+2	2	4	1
9	FW	(Brazil) BRA	Andre Shinyashiki	32	5	16+10	4	3+1	1	2	0
10	MF	(Azerbaijan) AZE	Filip Ozobić	37	8	24+5	7	2+2	1	3+1	0
11	FW	(Collectivity of Saint Martin) SMN	Keelan Lebon	37	2	22+7	1	1+3	0	4	1
14	MF	(Azerbaijan) AZE	Eddy Pascual	28	1	16+7	0	3	0	2	1
16	FW	(Argentina) ARG	Lucas Melano	12	0	4+7	0	0+1	0	0	0
17	MF	(Azerbaijan) AZE	Rahman Hajiyev	39	8	17+14	7	3+1	0	0+4	1
19	DF	(Azerbaijan) AZE	Azər Salahlı	32	2	23	2	4+1	0	1+3	0
20	FW	(Sierra Leone) SLE	Alpha Conteh	13	0	3+6	0	2+2	0	0	0
22	FW	(Russia) RUS	Reziuan Mirzov	25	1	8+13	0	2+2	1	0	0
23	MF	(Palestine) PLE	Ataa Jaber	20	3	12+4	3	0	0	4	0
26	DF	(Azerbaijan) AZE	Omar Buludov	5	0	1+1	0	0+1	0	2	0
30	GK	(Azerbaijan) AZE	Agil Mammadov	1	0	1	0	0	0	0	0
44	DF	(Brazil) BRA	Yuri Matias	38	5	30	5	4	0	4	0
77	FW	(Belarus) BLR	Yegor Bogomolsky	35	4	17+11	2	3+1	2	0+3	0
88	FW	(Colombia) COL	Brayan Moreno	18	4	11+4	4	1+2	0	0	0
91	FW	(Azerbaijan) AZE	Agadadash Salyanski	8	1	0+7	1	1	0	0	0
93	GK	(Azerbaijan) AZE	Rza Jafarov	27	0	23	0	4	0	0	0
99	DF	(Ivory Coast) CIV	Erwin Koffi	37	1	29+1	1	4	0	1+2	0
Players away on loan:
21	MF	(Azerbaijan) AZE	Ismayil Zulfugarli	9	0	1+4	0	1	0	1+2	0
27	MF	(Azerbaijan) AZE	Farid Yusifli	2	0	0	0	0	0	1+1	0
Players who left Neftçi during the season:
5	MF	(United States) USA	Kenny Saief	18	2	11+3	1	0	0	4	1
25	FW	(Nigeria) NGR	Aaron Olanare	15	3	6+6	2	1	1	1+1	0

=== Goal scorers ===
Place	Position	Nation	Number	Name	Premier League	Azerbaijan Cup	Europa Conference League	Total
1	MF	(Azerbaijan)	10	Filip Ozobić	7	1	0	8
1	MF	(Azerbaijan)	17	Rahman Hajiyev	7	0	1	8
3	MF	(Azerbaijan)	8	Emin Mahmudov	3	2	1	6
4	DF	(Brazil)	44	Yuri Matias	5	0	0	5
4	FW	(Brazil)	9	Andre Shinyashiki	4	1	0	5
4				Own goal	3	1	1	5
7	FW	(Colombia)	88	Brayan Moreno	4	0	0	4
7	FW	(Belarus)	77	Yegor Bogomolsky	2	2	0	4
9	MF	(Paraguay)	6	Mudo Valdez	3	0	0	3
9	MF	(Palestine)	23	Ataa Jaber	3	0	0	3
9	FW	(Nigeria)	25	Aaron Olanare	2	1	0	3
12	DF	(Azerbaijan)	19	Azər Salahlı	2	0	0	2
12	MF	(United States)	5	Kenny Saief	1	0	1	2
12	FW	(Collectivity of Saint Martin)	11	Keelan Lebon	1	0	1	2
15	MF	(Azerbaijan)	7	Azer Aliyev	1	0	0	1
15	DF	(Ivory Coast)	99	Erwin Koffi	1	0	0	1
15	FW	(Azerbaijan)	91	Agadadash Salyanski	1	0	0	1
15	DF	(Azerbaijan)	2	Qara Qarayev	1	0	0	1
15	FW	(Russia)	22	Reziuan Mirzov	0	1	0	1
15	MF	(Azerbaijan)	14	Eddy Pascual	0	0	1	1
				TOTALS	51	9	6	66

=== Clean sheets ===
Place	Position	Nation	Number	Name	Premier League	Azerbaijan Cup	Europa Conference League	Total
1	GK	(Azerbaijan)	93	Rza Jafarov	9	1	0	10
2	GK	(Croatia)	1	Ivan Brkić	5	0	1	6
				TOTALS	14	1	1	16

Rza Jafarov & Ivan Brkić both played in Neftçi's 2-0 victory over Gabala on 27 August 2023

=== Disciplinary record ===
Number	Nation	Position	Name	Premier League		Azerbaijan Cup		Europa Conference League		Total	
Number	Nation	Position	Name	Yellow card	Red card	Yellow card	Red card	Yellow card	Red card	Yellow card	Red card
1	(Croatia)	GK	Ivan Brkić	2	0	1	0	1	0	4	0
2	(Azerbaijan)	DF	Qara Qarayev	3	0	1	0	0	0	4	0
3	(Azerbaijan)	DF	Hojjat Haghverdi	6	0	0	0	0	0	6	0
4	(Hungary)	DF	Márk Tamás	4	0	0	0	0	0	4	0
6	(Paraguay)	MF	Mudo Valdez	5	1	3	0	0	0	8	1
7	(Azerbaijan)	MF	Azer Aliyev	2	0	0	0	0	0	2	0
8	(Azerbaijan)	MF	Emin Mahmudov	6	0	1	0	1	0	8	0
9	(Brazil)	FW	Andre Shinyashiki	4	0	1	0	0	0	5	0
10	(Azerbaijan)	MF	Filip Ozobić	6	0	0	0	0	0	6	0
11	(Collectivity of Saint Martin)	FW	Keelan Lebon	3	0	1	0	0	0	4	0
14	(Azerbaijan)	MF	Eddy Pascual	6	0	2	0	0	0	8	0
16	(Argentina)	FW	Lucas Melano	1	0	0	0	0	0	1	0
17	(Azerbaijan)	MF	Rahman Hajiyev	2	0	0	0	0	0	2	0
19	(Azerbaijan)	DF	Azər Salahlı	9	0	0	0	0	0	9	0
20	(Sierra Leone)	FW	Alpha Conteh	1	0	1	0	0	0	2	0
22	(Russia)	FW	Reziuan Mirzov	3	0	0	0	0	0	3	0
23	(Palestine)	MF	Ataa Jaber	3	0	0	0	1	0	4	0
30	(Azerbaijan)	GK	Agil Mammadov	1	0	0	0	0	0	1	0
44	(Brazil)	DF	Yuri Matias	13	2	2	0	1	0	16	2
77	(Belarus)	FW	Yegor Bogomolsky	3	1	0	0	0	0	3	1
88	(Colombia)	FW	Brayan Moreno	3	0	1	0	0	0	4	0
93	(Azerbaijan)	GK	Rza Jafarov	2	1	1	0	0	0	3	1
Players away on loan:
21	(Azerbaijan)	MF	Ismayil Zulfugarli	1	0	0	0	1	0	2	0
Players who left Neftçi during the season:
5	(United States)	MF	Kenny Saief	2	0	0	0	2	0	4	0
25	(Nigeria)	FW	Aaron Olanare	2	0	0	0	0	0	2	0
			TOTALS	94	4	15	0	7	0	116	4
