= Cəfərli =

Cəfərli or Dzhafarly or Dzhafarli may refer to:

- Cəfərli, Agsu, Azerbaijan
- Cəfərli, Gadabay, Azerbaijan
- Cəfərli, Imishli, Azerbaijan
- Cəfərli, Jalilabad (disambiguation)
- Cəfərli, Qazakh, Azerbaijan
