= Daryurd =

- Municipality
- Location within Azerbaijan
- Coordinates: 40°32′N 45°40′E
- Country: Azerbaijan
- District: Gadabay

Population
  - Total: 1,548
- Time zone: UTC+4 (AZT)
  - Summer (DST): UTC+5 (AZT)

Daryurd is a village and municipality in the Gadabay District of Azerbaijan. It has a population of 1,548. The municipality consists of the villages of Daryurd, Jafarli, and Naghylar.
