= Emin Mahmudov =

Azerbaijani footballer (born 1992)

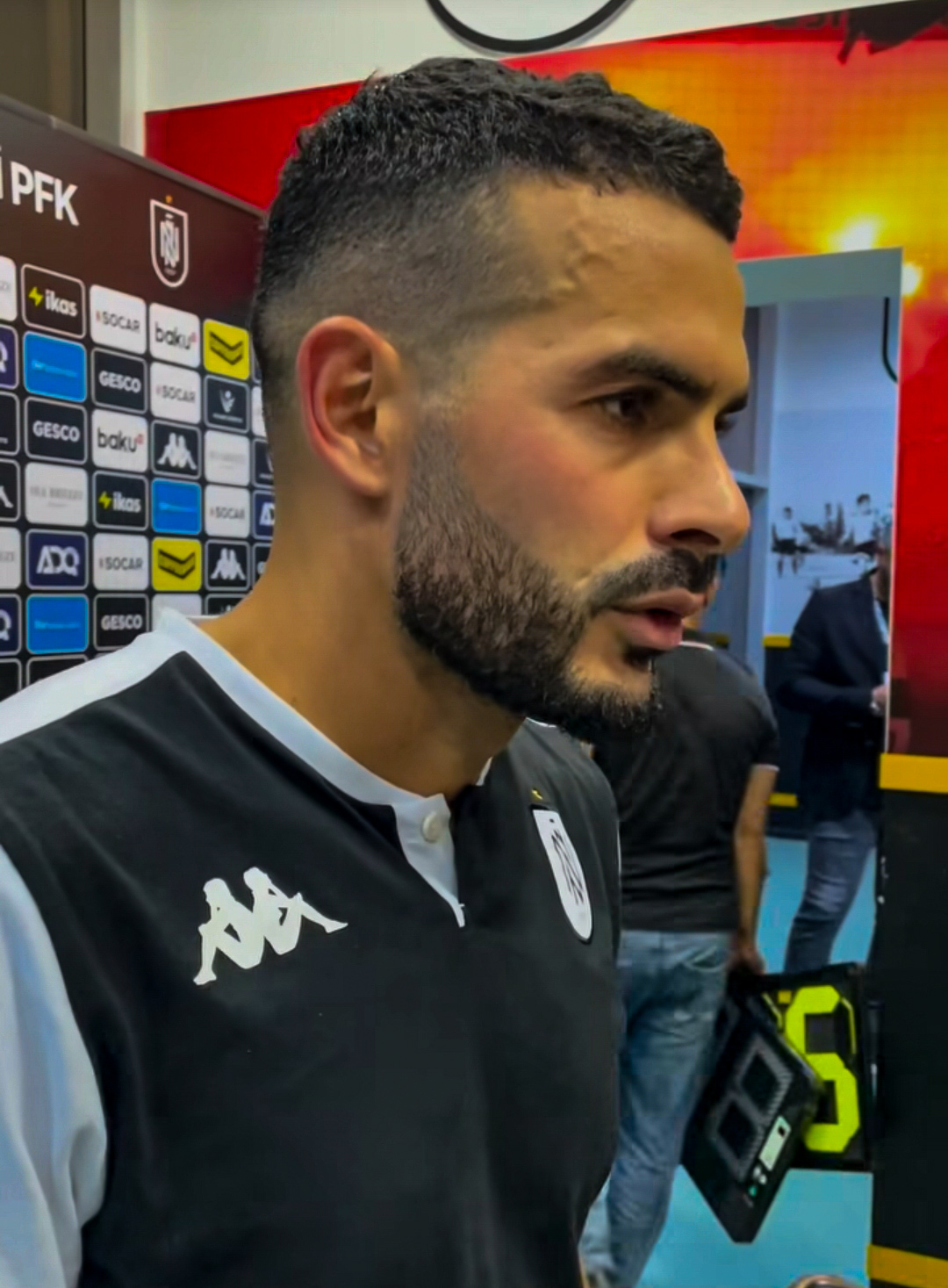
- Mahmudov in 2025

Personal information
- Full name: Emin Cəbrayıl oğlu Mahmudov
- Date of birth: 27 April 1992 (age 34)
- Place of birth: Saatly, Azerbaijan
- Height: 1.76 m (5 ft 9 in)
- Positions: Central midfielder; attacking midfielder

Team information
- Current team: Neftçi
- Number: 8

Youth career
- 2007–2010: Saturn

Senior career*
Years	Team	Apps	(Gls)
2010	Saturn Ramenskoye	21	(1)
2011–2014	Spartak Moscow	13	(0)
2012	→ Tom Tomsk (loan)	8	(0)
2013	→ Krylia Sovetov (loan)	12	(0)
2014–2016	Krylia Sovetov	6	(0)
2015–2016	→ Mordovia (loan)	18	(0)
2016–2017	Boavista	12	(1)
2017–	Neftçi	244	(56)

International career^{‡}
2009–2010	Russia U18	6	(3)
2010–2011	Russia U19	9	(3)
2011–2012	Russia U20	4	(1)
2012–2014	Russia U21	15	(2)
2016–2026	Azerbaijan	66	(16)
- * Club domestic league appearances and goals as of 13:08, 17 November 2026 ‡ National team caps and goals as of 23:58, 16 November 2026 (UTC)

Emin Cəbrayıl oğlu Mahmudov (born 27 April 1992) is an Azerbaijani professional footballer who plays as a midfielder for Azerbaijan Premier League club Neftçi and captains the Azerbaijan national team. He was selected as the Azerbaijani Footballer of the Year in 2021 and 2022.

Mahmudov is Azerbaijan's all-time top goalscorer.

== Club career ==
=== Saturn Ramenskoye ===
Mahmudov was born in Saatly, Azerbaijan in 1992. As a child, he moved to Russia with his family and started playing football in the youth academy of Saturn Ramenskoye. During the 2010 season, he became the player of the senior team. Mahmudov made his debut in Russian Premier League on 24 April 2010, in a match against Dinamo Moscow, at the age of 17. He scored his first goal at the senior level against Anzhi on 20 November. Mahmudov played a total of 22 matches during his first season in the Premier League.

=== Spartak Moscow ===
After the dissolution of Saturn, Mahmudov signed a long-term contract with Spartak Moscow as a free agent on 15 January 2011. He played 90 minutes against Rostov in the first game of the 2011–12 season. Mahmudov appeared in a total of 12 matches during the season for Spartak, however despite a successful start, he was not able to become the player of the main squad. During the three seasons between 2012 and 2014, Mahmudov played on loan for Premier League teams Tomsk and Krylia Sovetov and also played for the reserve team of Spartak.

=== Krylia Sovetov ===
After a one-year loan, Krylia Sovetov purchased Mahmudov from Spartak on 31 January 2014, for €250,000. The same season Krylia got relegated from the Premier League. However, the 2014–15 season Krylia Sovetov became the champions of Russian Football National League and won the promotion to Premier League again. He missed most of that season due to a fractured leg injury that he received in September 2014.

Mahmudov made his comeback to the Russian Premier League on 9 August 2015, during the game against his previous team Spartak Moscow. On 31 August, it was announced that he would play on loan at Mordovia Saransk until the end of the 2015–16 season. Mahmudov made his debut for Mordovia on 20 September and soon became one of the regular members of the starting squad.

=== Boavista ===
On 21 July 2016, Mahmudov signed a two-year contract with Boavista. He debuted for Boavista in a Primeira Liga match against Sporting CP on 26 November 2016. On 23 December 2016, Mahmudov scored his first goal for the club, away against Nacional, in Primeira Liga.

=== Neftchi Baku ===
On 18 September 2017, Mahmudov signed with Neftchi Baku until the end of 2017–18 season. He made his Azerbaijan Premier League debut for Neftchi Baku against Gabala on 24 September 2017. He scored his first goal for Neftchi Baku in an Azerbaijan Premier League match against Gabala on 19 November 2017. On 17 June 2018, Mahmudov a new contract with Neftçi PFK until the end of the 2019/20 season. In summer of 2019, after the departure of Ruslan Abishov, he became the new captain of the club.

After finishing the league in second place for two consecutive seasons, Mahmudov greatly contributed to Neftchi's championship in the 2020–21 season of the Azerbaijan Premier League. Due to his performance at both Neftchi and the national team, he was selected as the player of the year in Azerbaijan during the vote at the end of 2021.

== International career ==
As a dual citizen of Azerbaijan and Russia, Emin was eligible to play for both countries. Mahmudov played for Azerbaijani youth national teams until 2007, and played for all youth levels of Russian national team until 2014. Mahmudov twice became the champion of Commonwealth of Independent States Cup in 2012 and 2013 with the Russian under-21 team.

Mahmudov decided to play for the Azerbaijan national football team in 2016. He made his debut in a 1–0 win over San Marino in the 2018 World Cup qualification.

In 2021, Mahmudov set multiple new records for the national team by becoming the first player to score 7 international goals in a single year and 4 goals in a single qualification event, as part of the 2022 World Cup qualification tournament.

On 11 June 2024, he scored a goal in a 3–2 victory over Kazakhstan in a friendly match, becoming the joint top scorer for Azerbaijan with 14 international goals, sharing the record with Gurban Gurbanov.

On 9 September 2025, he scored a goal on a penalty kick in a 1–1 tie with Ukraine in a 2026 FIFA World Cup qualification game, thus becoming the sole top scorer for Azerbaijan with 15 goals.

== Career statistics ==
=== Club ===
As of match played 1 November 2026

Appearances and goals by club, season and competition
Club	Season	League			Cup		Other		Europe		Total	
Club	Season	Division	Apps	Goals	Apps	Goals	Apps	Goals	Apps	Goals	Apps	Goals
Saturn Ramenskoye	2010	Russian Premier League	21	1	1	0	–		–		22	1
Spartak Moscow	2010	Russian Premier League	0	0	2	0	–		–		2	0
Spartak Moscow	2011–12	Russian Premier League	12	0	2	0	–		–		14	0
Spartak Moscow	2012–13	Russian Premier League	1	0	0	0	–		–		1	0
Spartak Moscow	Total		13	0	4	0	–		–		17	0
Tom Tomsk (loan)	2011–12	Russian Premier League	8	0	0	0	–		–		8	0
Krylia Sovetov (loan)	2012–13	Russian Premier League	0	0	0	0	2 (Note: Appearances in Russian Premier League relegation play-offs)	0	–		2	0
Krylia Sovetov Samara	2013–14	Russian Premier League	12	0	0	0	–		–		12	0
Krylia Sovetov Samara	2014–15	Russian Football National League	5	0	0	0	–		–		5	0
Krylia Sovetov Samara	2015–16	Russian Premier League	1	0	0	0	–		–		1	0
Krylia Sovetov Samara	Total		18	0	0	0	0	0	–		18	0
Mordovia Saransk (loan)	2015–16	Russian Premier League	18	0	1	0	–		–		19	0
Boavista	2016–17	Primeira Liga	12	1	0	0	–		–		12	1
Neftchi Baku	2017–18	Azerbaijan Premier League	22	1	5	1	–		–		27	2
Neftchi Baku	2018–19	Azerbaijan Premier League	26	8	0	0	–		1 (Note: Appearances in UEFA Europa League)	1	27	9
Neftchi Baku	2019–20	Azerbaijan Premier League	19	3	1	0	–		6	3	26	6
Neftchi Baku	2020–21	Azerbaijan Premier League	23	4	2	0	–		2	0	27	4
Neftchi Baku	2021–22	Azerbaijan Premier League	27	5	4	1	–		8 (Note: Two appearances and one goal in UEFA Europa League, two appearances and one goal in UEFA Europa Conference League, four appearances and two goals in UEFA Champions League)	4	39	10
Neftchi Baku	2022–23	Azerbaijan Premier League	36	17	5	2	–		4 (Note: Appearances in UEFA Europa Conference League)	0	45	19
Neftchi Baku	2023–24	Azerbaijan Premier League	30	3	3	2	–		4	1	37	6
Neftchi Baku	2024–25	Azerbaijan Premier League	22	4	4	1	–		–		26	5
Neftchi Baku	2025–26	Azerbaijan Premier League	32	11	1	0	–		–		33	11
Neftchi Baku	2026–27	Azerbaijan Premier League	7	0	0	0	–		2 (Note: appearances and goal in UEFA Conference League)	1	9	1
Neftchi Baku	Total		244	56	25	7	0	0	27	10	296	73
Career total			334	58	31	7	2	0	27	10	392	75

=== International ===
As of match played 16 November 2026

Appearances and goals by national team and year
National team	Year	Apps	Goals
Azerbaijan	2016	2	0
Azerbaijan	2017	0	0
Azerbaijan	2018	7	1
Azerbaijan	2019	5	0
Azerbaijan	2021	12	7
Azerbaijan	2022	10	1
Azerbaijan	2023	9	4
Azerbaijan	2024	7	1
Azerbaijan	2025	8	1
Azerbaijan	2026	6	1
Total		66	16

Scores and results list Azerbaijan's goal tally first, score column indicates score after each Mahmudov goal.

List of international goals scored by Emin Mahmudov
No.	Date	Venue	Opponent	Score	Result	Competition
1	9 June 2018	Daugava Stadium, Riga, Latvia	Latvia	3–0	3–1	Friendly
2	30 March 2021	Baku Olympic Stadium, Baku, Azerbaijan	Serbia	1–1	1–2	2022 FIFA World Cup qualification
3	27 May 2021	Bahçeşehir Okulları Stadium, Alanya, Turkey	Turkey	1–0	1–2	Friendly
4	1 September 2021	Stade de Luxembourg, Luxembourg City, Luxembourg	Luxembourg	1–2	1–2	2022 FIFA World Cup qualification
5	4 September 2021	Aviva Stadium, Dublin, Republic of Ireland	Republic of Ireland	1–0	1–1	2022 FIFA World Cup qualification
6	12 October 2021	Rajko Mitić Stadium, Belgrad, Serbia	Serbia	1–1	1–3	2022 FIFA World Cup qualification
7	14 November 2021	Baku Olympic Stadium, Baku, Azerbaijan	Qatar	1–1	2–2	Friendly
8	14 November 2021	Baku Olympic Stadium, Baku, Azerbaijan	Qatar	2–1	2–2	Friendly
9	16 November 2022	Zimbru Stadium, Chişinău, Moldova	Moldova	1–0	2–1	Friendly
10	24 March 2023	Raiffeisen Arena, Linz, Austria	Austria	1–2	1–4	UEFA Euro 2024 qualifying
11	12 September 2023	Dalga Arena, Baku, Azerbaijan	Jordan	1–0	2–1	Friendly
12	16 November 2023	Tofiq Bahramov Republican Stadium, Baku, Azerbaijan	Sweden	1–0	3–0	UEFA Euro 2024 qualifying
13	16 November 2023	Tofiq Bahramov Republican Stadium, Baku, Azerbaijan	Sweden	3–0	3–0	UEFA Euro 2024 qualifying
14	11 June 2024	Haladás Sportkomplexum, Szombathely, Hungary	Kazakhstan	2–2	3–2	Friendly
15	9 September 2025	Tofiq Bahramov Republican Stadium, Baku, Azerbaijan	Ukraine	1–1	1–1	2026 FIFA World Cup qualification
16	27 March 2026	Sumgayit City Stadium, Sumgait, Azerbaijan	Saint Lucia	1–0	6–1	2026 FIFA Series

== Honours ==
Neftchi Baku

- Azerbaijan Premier League: 2020–21

Krylia Sovetov

- Russian Football National League: 2014–15

Russia U21

- Commonwealth of Independent States Cup: 2012, 2013

Individual

- Azerbaijani Footballer of the Year: 2021, 2022
