= Yegor Bogomolsky =

Belarusian footballer (born 2000)

Personal information
- Full name: Yegor Aleksandrovich Bogomolsky
- Date of birth: 3 June 2000 (age 26)
- Place of birth: Minsk, Belarus
- Height: 1.86 m (6 ft 1 in)
- Position: Forward

Team information
- Current team: Zira
- Number: 77

Youth career
- 2013–2019: Dinamo Minsk

Senior career*
Years	Team	Apps	(Gls)
2019	Dinamo Minsk	7	(0)
2019–2020	Dinamo Brest	1	(0)
2020	→ Rukh Brest (loan)	23	(3)
2021	Rukh Brest	0	(0)
2021	→ Minsk (loan)	27	(6)
2022	Minsk	15	(8)
2022–2025	Neftchi Baku	67	(6)
2025–	Zira	19	(1)
2026	→ Ural Yekaterinburg (loan)	10	(0)

International career^{‡}
2020–2022	Belarus U21	13	(1)
2022	Belarus	6	(0)
- * Club domestic league appearances and goals as of 16 May 2026 ‡ National team caps and goals as of 20 November 2022

Yegor Aleksandrovich Bogomolsky (Belarusian: Ягор Аляксандравіч Багамольскі; Russian: Егор Александрович Богомольский; born 3 June 2000) is a Belarusian professional footballer who plays for Azerbaijani side Zira and the Belarus national team.

== Career ==
=== Club ===
On 20 July 2022, Neftçi announced the signing of Bogomolsky from Minsk, to a three-year contract. On 31 May 2025, Neftçi announced the departure of Bogomolsky at the end of his contract.

On 7 June 2025, Zira announced the signing of Bogomolsky to a two-year contract. On 17 February 2026, Bogomolsky was loaned by Ural Yekaterinburg of the Russian First League.

== Career statistics ==
As of 23 May 2026

Club	Season	League			Cup		Continental		Other		Total	
Club	Season	Division	Apps	Goals	Apps	Goals	Apps	Goals	Apps	Goals	Apps	Goals
Dinamo Minsk	2019	Belarusian Premier League	7	0	1	0	0	0	—		8	0
Dinamo Brest	2019	Belarusian Premier League	1	0	—		—		—		1	0
Rukh Brest (loan)	2020	Belarusian Premier League	23	3	2	0	—		—		25	3
Minsk (loan)	2021	Belarusian Premier League	27	6	3	1	—		—		30	7
Minsk	2022	Belarusian Premier League	15	8	1	0	—		—		16	8
Neftchi Baku	2022–23	Azerbaijan Premier League	27	3	4	1	1 (Note: Appearances in UEFA Conference League)	0	—		32	4
Neftchi Baku	2023–24	Azerbaijan Premier League	28	2	4	2	3	0	—		35	4
Neftchi Baku	2024–25	Azerbaijan Premier League	12	1	2	2	—		—		14	3
Neftchi Baku	Total		67	6	10	5	4	0	1	0	81	11
Zira	2025–26	Azerbaijan Premier League	19	1	2	0	1	0	—		22	1
Ural Yekaterinburg (loan)	2025–26	Russian First League	10	0	—		—		2 (Note: Appearances in promotion play-offs)	0	12	0
Career total			169	24	19	6	5	0	2	0	195	30

== Honours ==
Dinamo Brest

- Belarusian Premier League champion: 2019
