= Keelan Lebon =

French footballer (born 1997)

Personal information
- Date of birth: 4 July 1997 (age 29)
- Place of birth: Paris, France
- Height: 1.74 m (5 ft 9 in)
- Position: Winger

Team information
- Current team: Suwon Samsung Bluewings
- Number: 8

Senior career*
Years	Team	Apps	(Gls)
2014–2016	Amiens II	1	(0)
2016–2018	Paris II	26	(5)
2017–2018	→ Chambly (loan)	14	(1)
2018	→ Chambly II	4	(1)
2019	Jong Utrecht	17	(2)
2019–2020	Gazélec Ajaccio	13	(0)
2020	→ Créteil (loan)	2	(1)
2020	→ Créteil II	1	(0)
2020–2022	Beroe	43	(3)
2022–2022	Astana	11	(1)
2023–2025	Neftçi	72	(6)
2025	Athens Kallithea	13	(2)
2025–2026	Jeonnam Dragons	29	(4)
2026–	Suwon Samsung Bluewings	1	(0)

International career^{‡}
2023–	Saint Martin	6	(3)
- * Club domestic league appearances and goals as of 6 January 2026 ‡ National team caps and goals as of 6 January 2026

Keelan Lebon (born 4 July 1997) is a professional footballer who plays as a winger for K League 2 club Suwon Samsung Bluewings. Born in mainland France, he plays for the Saint Martin national team.

== Club career ==
On 10 August 2022, Astana announced the signing of Lebon. On 19 January 2023, Astana announced that Lebon had left the club by mutual consent, signing with Azerbaijan Premier League club Neftçi on an 18-month contract later the same day. On 14 January 2025, Neftçi announced that Lebon had left the club after his contract was terminated by mutual consent.

On 5 February 2025, Athens Kallithea announced the signing of Lebon.

== International career ==
Born in France, Lebon is of Saint-Martinois. In November 2023, he was called up to the Saint Martin national team.

== Career statistics ==
=== Club ===
As of match played 15 December 2024

Appearances and goals by club, season and competition.
Club	Season	League			National Cup		Continental		Other		Total	
Club	Season	Division	Apps	Goals	Apps	Goals	Apps	Goals	Apps	Goals	Apps	Goals
Beroe Stara Zagora	2020–21	Bulgarian First League	19	1	1	0	—				20	1
Beroe Stara Zagora	2021–22	Bulgarian First League	24	2	2	0	—				26	2
Beroe Stara Zagora	Total		43	3	3	0	-	-	-	-	46	3
Astana	2022	Kazakhstan Premier League	11	1	2	1	0	0	—		13	2
Neftçi	2022–23	Azerbaijan Premier League	17	4	3	0	0	0	—		20	4
Neftçi	2023–24	Azerbaijan Premier League	29	1	0	0	4	1	—		33	2
Neftçi	2024–25	Azerbaijan Premier League	16	0	0	0	—		—		16	0
Neftçi	Total		62	5	7	0	4	1	-	-	73	6
Career total			127	9	12	1	4	1	-	-	143	11

=== International ===
As of match played 21 November 2023

Appearances and goals by national team and year
National team	Year	Apps	Goals
Saint Martin	2023	2	0
Total		2	0
