= Yuri Matias =

Brazilian footballer (born 1995)

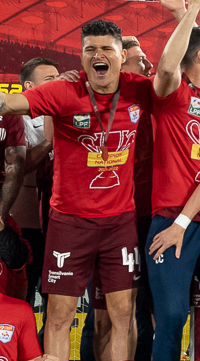
- Matias with CFR Cluj in 2022

Personal information
- Full name: Jefferson Yuri de Sousa Matias
- Date of birth: 10 February 1995 (age 31)
- Place of birth: Campina Grande, Brazil
- Height: 1.86 m (6 ft 1 in)
- Position: Centre-back

Team information
- Current team: Ajman Club
- Number: 44

Youth career
- –2013: América-PE

Senior career*
Years	Team	Apps	(Gls)
2014–2016	América-PE	25	(0)
2016–2020	Académica	58	(3)
2020	Tractor	2	(0)
2020–2022	Gaz Metan Mediaș	47	(6)
2022–2023	CFR Cluj	49	(4)
2023–2025	Neftchi Baku	58	(7)
2025–	Ajman Club	0	(0)
- * Club domestic league appearances and goals as of 27 June 2025

Jefferson Yuri de Sousa Matias (born 10 February 1995) is a Brazilian professional footballer who plays as a centre-back for UAE Pro League club Ajman Club.

== Career ==
Born in Campina Grande, Brazil, Matias joined Académica de Coimbra on 27 June 2016 on a one-year loan. He made his debut on 30 July 2016, in an away draw against Gil Vicente F.C.

On 3 April 2017, he signed a permanent deal to stay at Académica.

In January 2020, Académica terminated his contract on mutual consent and Yuri signed a six month deal with Persian Gulf Pro League side Tractor S.C.

== Career statistics ==
As of match played 4 May 2025

Appearances and goals by club, season and competition
Club	Season	League			National cup (Note: Includes Taça de Portugal, Cupa României, Azerbaijan Cup)		Europe		Other		Total	
Club	Season	Division	Apps	Goals	Apps	Goals	Apps	Goals	Apps	Goals	Apps	Goals
América-PE	2014	State league	—		—		—		1 (Note: Appearance(s) in Campeonato Pernambucano Série A1)	0	1	0
América-PE	2015	State league	—		—		—		10	0	10	0
América-PE	2016	Série D	—		—		—		14	0	14	0
América-PE	Total		—		—		—		25	0	25	0
Académica	2016–17	Liga Portugal 2	15	1	0	0	—		1 (Note: Appearance(s) in Taça da Liga)	0	16	1
Académica	2017–18	Liga Portugal 2	13	0	2	0	—		1	0	16	0
Académica	2018–19	Liga Portugal 2	27	2	—		—		—		27	2
Académica	2019–20	Liga Portugal 2	3	0	—		—		0	0	3	0
Académica	Total		58	3	2	0	—		2	0	62	3
Tractor	2019–20	Persian Gulf Pro League	2	0	—		—		—		2	0
Gaz Metan Mediaș	2020–21	Liga I	27	2	1	0	—		—		28	2
Gaz Metan Mediaș	2021–22	Liga I	20	4	1	1	—		—		21	5
Gaz Metan Mediaș	Total		47	6	2	1	—		—		49	7
CFR Cluj	2021–22	Liga I	14	0	—		—		—		14	0
CFR Cluj	2022–23	Liga I	35	4	2	0	13 (Note: One appearance in UEFA Champions League, twelve appearances and two goals in UEFA Europa Conference League)	2	1 (Note: Appearance in Supercupa României)	0	51	6
CFR Cluj	Total		49	4	2	0	13	2	1	0	65	6
Neftçi Baku	2023–24	Azerbaijan Premier League	30	5	4	0	4 (Note: Appearances in UEFA Europa Conference League)	0	—		38	5
Neftçi Baku	2024–25	Azerbaijan Premier League	28	2	5	3	—		—		33	5
Neftçi Baku	Total		58	7	9	3	4	0	—		71	10
Career total			214	20	15	4	17	2	28	0	274	26

== Honours ==
CFR Cluj

- Liga I: 2021–22
- Supercupa României runner-up: 2022

Individual

- Liga I Team of the Season: 2022–23,
