= Azer Aliyev =

Azerbaijani footballer (born 1994)

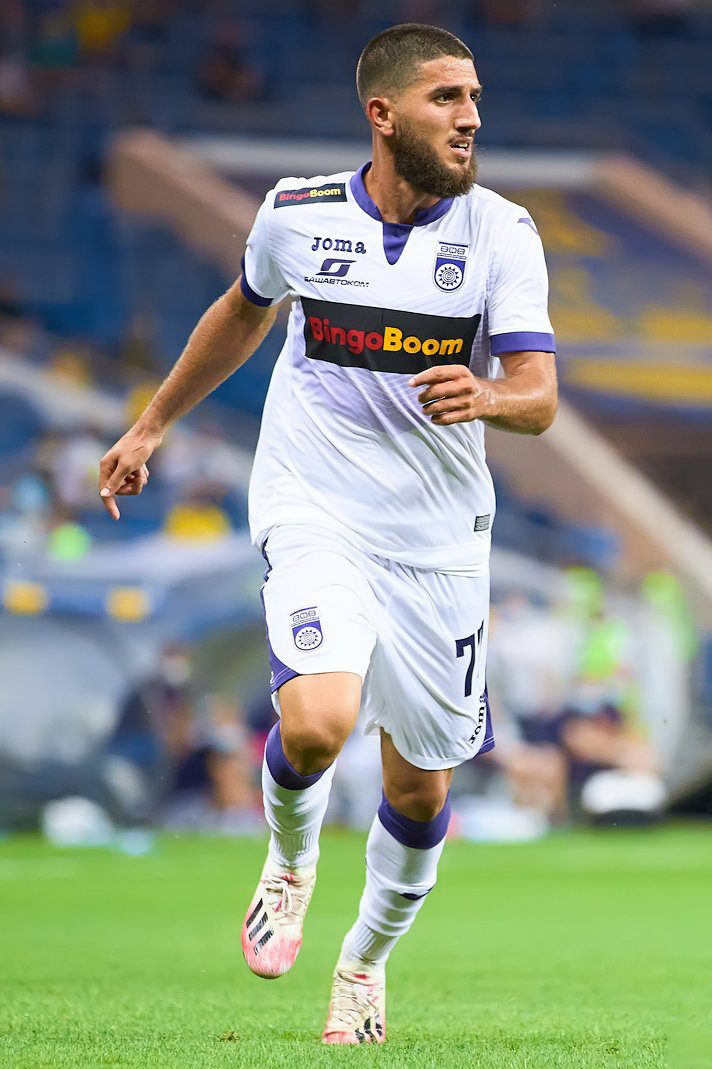
- Aliyev with FC Ufa in 2020

Personal information
- Full name: Azer Ilgar ogly Aliyev
- Date of birth: 12 May 1994 (age 32)
- Place of birth: Bazaklo, Georgia
- Height: 1.68 m (5 ft 6 in)
- Position: Midfielder

Team information
- Current team: Yenisey
- Number: 10

Youth career
- –2012: DYuSSh-2 Krasnoyarsk

Senior career*
Years	Team	Apps	(Gls)
2012–2017	Yenisey	90	(6)
2013	→ Sakhalin Yuzhno-Sakhalinsk (loan)	10	(6)
2017–2018	Krylia Sovetov	39	(4)
2018–2020	Ufa	46	(2)
2019	→ Ufa-2	1	(0)
2021	Tambov	10	(1)
2021–2022	Ufa	13	(0)
2022–2025	Neftçi	55	(2)
2025–	Yenisey	0	(0)

International career^{‡}
2023–	Azerbaijan	1	(0)
- * Club domestic league appearances and goals as of 16 May 2026 ‡ National team caps and goals as of 24 March 2023

Azer Ilgar ogly Aliyev (Azerbaijani: Azər İlqar oğlu Əliyev; Russian: Азер Илгар оглы Алиев; born 12 May 1994) is a professional footballer who plays as a midfielder for Russian First League club Yenisey. While his primary position is left midfielder, he also plays as right midfielder or attacking midfielder. Born in Georgia, Aliyev grew up and started his career in Russia. He plays for the Azerbaijan national team.

== Club career ==
Aliyev made his debut in the Russian National Football League for Yenisey Krasnoyarsk on 13 April 2013 in a game against Sibir Novosibirsk.

He made his Russian Premier League debut with Krylia Sovetov Samara on 11 August 2018 as a substitute for Nadson in a game against Rostov.

He was released from his Krylia Sovetov contract by mutual consent on 29 August 2018.

On 31 August 2018, Aliyev signed with Ufa. On 25 December 2020, he was released by Ufa by mutual consent.

On 30 June 2021, he returned to Ufa on a 1-year contract. On 27 January 2022, his contract was terminated by mutual consent. On the same day, he signed with Neftçi in Azerbaijan.

On 12 December 2025, Aliyev returned to his first club Yenisey on a contract until the end of the 2025–26 season.

== Career statistics ==
As of 16 May 2026

Club	Season	League			Cup		Continental		Other		Total	
Club	Season	Division	Apps	Goals	Apps	Goals	Apps	Goals	Apps	Goals	Apps	Goals
Yenisey	2012–13	Russian First League	3	0	0	0	—		—		3	0
Yenisey	2013–14	Russian First League	5	0	0	0	—		—		5	0
Yenisey	2014–15	Russian First League	13	1	1	0	—		4 (Note: Appearances in FNL Cup)	0	18	1
Yenisey	2015–16	Russian First League	32	2	2	1	—		3	2	37	5
Yenisey	2016–17	Russian First League	37	3	2	0	—		7 (Note: Two appearances in promotion play-offs, five appearances in FNL Cup)	0	46	3
Yenisey	Total		90	6	5	1	0	0	14	2	109	9
Sakhalin (loan)	2013–14	Russian Second League	10	6	—		—		—		10	6
Krylia Sovetov	2017–18	Russian First League	38	4	2	1	—		1	0	41	5
Krylia Sovetov	2018–19	Russian Premier League	1	0	—		—		—		1	0
Krylia Sovetov	Total		39	4	2	1	0	0	1	0	42	5
Ufa	2018–19	Russian Premier League	13	0	1	0	—		0	0	14	0
Ufa	2019–20	Russian Premier League	19	1	2	0	—		—		21	1
Ufa	2020–21	Russian Premier League	14	1	2	0	—		—		16	1
Ufa	Total		46	2	5	0	0	0	0	0	51	2
Ufa-2	2018–19	Russian Second League	1	0	—		—		—		1	0
Tambov	2020–21	Russian Premier League	10	1	—		—		—		10	1
Ufa	2021–22	Russian Premier League	13	0	2	0	—		—		15	0
Neftçi	2021–22	Azerbaijan Premier League	11	0	3	0	—		—		14	0
Neftçi	2022–23	Azerbaijan Premier League	21	1	2	0	2 (Note: Appearances in UEFA Conference League)	0	—		25	1
Neftçi	2023–24	Azerbaijan Premier League	13	1	3	0	2	0	—		18	1
Neftçi	2024–25	Azerbaijan Premier League	10	0	2	0	—		—		12	0
Neftçi	Total		55	2	10	0	4	0	0	0	69	2
Yenisey	2025–26	Russian First League	0	0	0	0	—		—		0	0
Career total			264	21	24	2	4	0	15	2	307	25
