= Moustapha Seck =

Senegalese footballer

Personal information
- Full name: Moustapha Adjalian Seck
- Date of birth: 23 February 1996 (age 30)
- Place of birth: Dakar, Senegal
- Height: 1.76 m (5 ft 9 1/2 in)
- Position: Left-back

Team information
- Current team: Neftçi
- Number: 24

Youth career
- 2005–2013: Barcelona
- 2013–2016: Lazio

Senior career*
| Years | Team | Apps | (Gls) |
| 2016–2020 | Roma | 0 | (0) |
| 2017 | → Carpi (loan) | 3 | (0) |
| 2017–2018 | → Empoli (loan) | 6 | (0) |
| 2018 | → Novara (loan) | 7 | (0) |
| 2018–2019 | → Almere City (loan) | 27 | (0) |
| 2020 | → Livorno (loan) | 11 | (0) |
| 2020–2022 | Leixões | 49 | (1) |
| 2022–2024 | Portimonense | 48 | (0) |
| 2024– | Neftçi | 57 | (0) |
- * Club domestic league appearances and goals as of 22 June 2026

Moustapha Adjalian Seck (born 23 February 1996) is a Senegalese professional footballer who plays as a left back for Neftçi in the Azerbaijan Premier League.

== Club career ==
=== Early career ===
Born in Dakar, Senegal, Seck moved to Barcelona in Spain when he was five years old. He began playing football with his local football club before being picked up by Barcelona in 2005, and spent eight years in the club's Cantera. In 2013, Seck sought a new challenge and elected to follow in the footsteps of compatriot and former Barcelona teammate Keita Baldé and sign for Serie A side Lazio. At Lazio, Seck played for three seasons between the club's academy and reserve sides and won three titles before being released in 2016 following contractual disagreements with management.

=== Roma ===
Following the expiration of his contract with Lazio, Seck signed as a free-agent for local rivals Roma. On 9 December 2016, manager Luciano Spalletti handed him his debut in a 0–0 Europa League draw with Astra.

==== Loans to Carpi and Empoli ====
On the deadline day of the January 2017 transfer window, Seck agreed to join Serie B side Carpi on loan for the remainder of the season. He described the move as being the "right preparation" for him to achieve his goal of representing Senegal at the 2018 FIFA World Cup. He made his debut for the club on 5 February, coming on as a second-half substitute for Slovenian international Enej Jelenič in a 2–1 loss to Cesena. Seck ultimately made three appearances on loan at Carpi before returning to Roma at the end of the season.

In July the following year, Seck signed for recently-relegated Serie B side Empoli on a season-long loan. He made his debut in a 2–2 Coppa Italia penalty shootout loss to Renate.

==== Loan to Almere City ====
On 22 July 2018, Seck joined Eerste Divisie club Almere City on loan until 30 June 2019.

==== Loan to Livorno ====
On 31 January 2020, he was loaned to Serie B club Livorno.

== Career statistics ==
=== Club ===
As of 5 September 2020

Appearances and goals by club, season and competition
| Club | Season | League | | | Cup | | League Cup | | Europe | | Total | |
| Club | Season | League | Apps | Goals | Apps | Goals | Apps | Goals | Apps | Goals | Apps | Goals |
|---|---|---|---|---|---|---|---|---|---|---|---|---|
| Roma | 2016–17 | Serie A | 0 | 0 | 0 | 0 | 0 | 0 | 1 | 0 | 1 | 0 |
| Carpi (loan) | 2016–17 | Serie B | 3 | 0 | 0 | 0 | 0 | 0 | 0 | 0 | 3 | 0 |
| Empoli (loan) | 2017–18 | Serie B | 6 | 0 | 1 | 0 | 0 | 0 | 0 | 0 | 7 | 0 |
| Novara (loan) | 2017–18 | Serie B | 7 | 0 | 0 | 0 | 0 | 0 | 0 | 0 | 7 | 0 |
| Almere City (loan) | 2018–19 | Eerste Divisie | 27 | 0 | 2 | 0 | – | – | 2 | 0 | 31 | 0 |
| Livorno (loan) | 2019–20 | Serie B | 11 | 0 | 0 | 0 | 0 | 0 | 0 | 0 | 11 | 0 |
| Career total | | | 54 | 0 | 3 | 0 | 0 | 0 | 3 | 0 | 60 | 0 |
