= Matanat Jafarova =

Azerbaijani footballer (born 1986)

Personal information
- Date of birth: 19 January 1986 (age 40)
- Position: Defender

International career^{‡}
| Years | Team | Apps | (Gls) |
| 2004 | Azerbaijan U19 | 1+ | (0+) |
| 2010 | Azerbaijan | 5 | (0) |
- ‡ National team caps and goals as of 25 August 2010

Matanat Jafarova (Azerbaijani: Mətanət Cəfərova; born 19 January 1986) is an Azerbaijani former footballer who played as a defender. She has been a member of the Azerbaijan women's national team.
