= Andriy Shtohrin =

Ukrainian footballer

Personal information
- Full name: Andriy Vitaliyovych Shtohrin
- Date of birth: 14 December 1998 (age 27)
- Place of birth: Odesa, Ukraine
- Height: 1.82 m (6 ft 0 in)
- Position: Midfielder

Team information
- Current team: Neftçi
- Number: 70

Youth career
- –2015: Chornomorets Odesa

Senior career*
Years	Team	Apps	(Gls)
2015–2024	Chornomorets Odesa	122	(15)
2019	→ Chornomorets-2 Odesa	15	(1)
2024–	Neftçi	40	(3)

International career
2019	Ukraine (students)		
- * Club domestic league appearances and goals as of 24 May 2026

Andriy Vitaliyovych Shtohrin (Ukrainian: Андрій Віталійович Штогрін; born 14 December 1998) is a Ukrainian professional footballer who plays as a Midfielder for Azerbaijan Premier League club Neftçi.

== Club career ==
=== Chornomorets Odesa ===
He made his Ukrainian Premier League debut for FC Chornomorets Odesa on 19 May 2018 in a game against FC Zirka Kropyvnytskyi.

=== Neftçi Baku ===
In the summer of 2024, Shtohrin left Chornomorets Odesa and joined Neftçi Baku.
