= Zhaparov =

Zhaparov or Japarov (Cyrillic: Жапаров) is a Kipchak Turkic masculine surname, its feminine counterpart being Zhaparova or Japarova. The surname loans itself from the Russian suffix "-ov" or "-ova", meaning "son of" or "daughter of", and Japar/Zhapar, the Kipchak Turkic form of the Arabic name Ja'far. It may refer to

- Marat Zhaparov (born 1985), Kazakh ski jumper
- Radik Zhaparov (born 1984), Kazakh ski jumper, brother of Marat
- Ruslan Zhaparov (born 1996), Kazakh taekwondo competitor
- Sadyr Japarov (born 1968), Kyrgyz politician
