= Zaur Jafarov =

Azerbaijani powerlifter (born 1982)

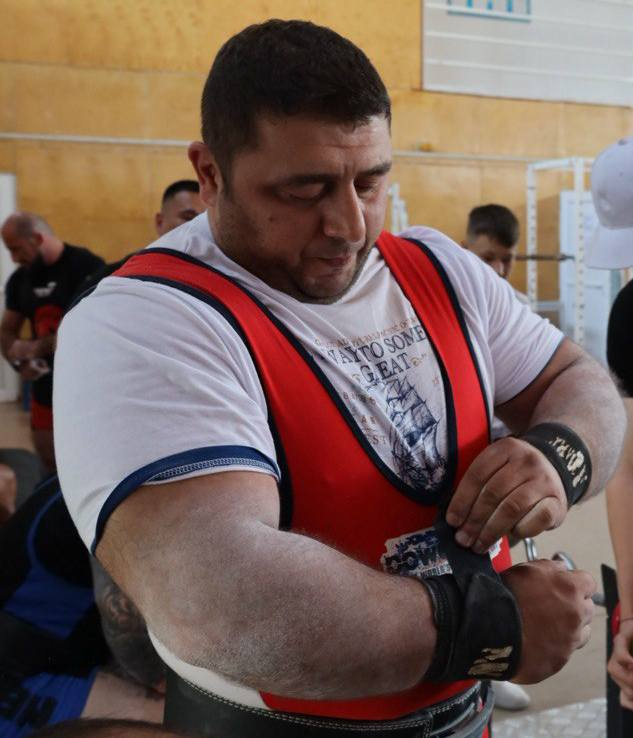
- Born: Zaur Aliaga ogly Jafarov; September 5, 1982 (age 43); Sumgait, Azerbaijan Soviet Socialist Republic, USSR
- Height: 5 ft 9 in (175 cm)
- Awards: Honored Master of Sports of Azerbaijan, Elite athlete, International class judge, International class master of sports

Zaur Aliaga ogly Jafarov (Azerbaijani: Zaur Aliaga ogly Jafarov; born September 5, 1982) is an Azerbaijani powerlifter, Honored master of sports of Azerbaijan, elite athlete, seven-time world champion, seven-time European champion, absolute World champion and absolute European champion, World Cup winner, international class judge, international class master of Sports, world and European record holder in the AWPC (doping control division), nine-time Champion of the Republic, three-time winner international powerlifting tournament dedicated to the birthday anniversary of Heydar Aliyev, national lider of Azerbaijan and two-time absolute champion . The only elite athlete in the history of Azerbaijani powerlifting who has fulfilled the requirements of the highest degree two times (according to AWPC, in the doping control division). In 2022, at the World Cup in Russia, won the title of “Elite athlete” for the first time in the history of powerlifting of Azerbaijan (according to AWPC, in the doping control division), fulfilling the requirements of the highest rank. In 2023, at the European Championships in Kyrgyzstan, he won second time the title of “Elite athlete”. For his high results, he was awarded the highest award in powerlifting “Elite Ring” by the leadership of the World Sports Organization of Powerlifting, at the 2023 Grand Prix tournament in Russia.

== Biography ==
=== Education ===
Born on September 5, 1982, in the Azerbaijani city of Sumgait. He received his secondary education at the Lyceum of Technical and Natural Sciences No.32 of Sumgait city. In 1998–2002, he studied at the Faculty of Engineering and Management of the Azerbaijan Technical University, receiving a bachelor's degree. In 2002–2004, he continued his studies at the Faculty of Economics and Management of the Azerbaijan Economic University, after graduating from the magistracy of which he received a diploma with honors. In 2004–2007 he received his third higher education at Sumgait State University, after which he defended his doctoral dissertation in the specialty "personnel management in the agricultural sector".

=== Family ===
Jafarov is married and lives in Baku. He has three sons.

== Sports career ==
Since 1997, he began to play sports professionally, later starting to take part in the republican championships in powerlifting. In his debut, 2010, he climbed to the highest step of the podium. The Azerbaijan Powerlifting Federation has attracted Zaur Jafarov to the national team. In 2015, he was selected "Sportsman of the Year".

== Achievements ==
Date	Competition	Location	Weight category	Medal
2011	World championship	York, Pennsylvania, US	110 kg	1
2014	Europe championship	Baku, Azerbaijan	100 kg	2
2017	Heydar Aliyev International Tournament	Baku, Azerbaijan	110 kg	1
2017	World championship	Dolgoprudny, Russia	125 kg	1
2017	World championship	Dolgoprudny, Russia	125 kg	3
2018	Heydar Aliyev International Tournament	Baku, Azerbaijan	110 kg	1
2018	Europe championship	Sochi, Russia	110 kg	1
2018	Europe championship	Sochi, Russia	110 kg	1
2018	World championship	Orlando, Florida, US	110 kg	1
2019	Heydar Aliyev International Tournament	Baku, Azerbaijan	110 kg	1
2019	Europe championship	Sochi, Russia	110 kg	1
2019	Europe championship	Sochi, Russia	110 kg	1
2019	World championship	Lahti, Finland	110 kg	1
2019	World championship	Lahti, Finland	110 kg	1
2021	World championship	Moscow, Russia	110 kg	1
2022	Europa championship	Kiskunfelegyhaza, Hungary	125 kg	1
2022	World championship	Moscow, Russia	110 kg	1
2023	Europa championship	Biskek, Kyrgyzia	125 kg	1
2023	Gran-Prix Kremlin Cup	Moscow, Russia	125 kg	1
2024	Europa championship	Salo, Finland	125 kg	1
2024	World championship	Moscow, Russia	125 kg	1
