= Rza Jafarov =

Azerbaijani footballer

Personal information
- Full name: Rza Isa oglu Jafarov
- Date of birth: 3 July 2003 (age 23)
- Height: 1.90 m (6 ft 3 in)
- Position: Goalkeeper

Team information
- Current team: Qabala (on loan from Neftçi)
- Number: 93

Youth career
- Neftçi

Senior career*
Years	Team	Apps	(Gls)
2021–	Neftçi	55	(0)
2026–	→ Qabala (loan)	6	(0)

International career^{‡}
2023–	Azerbaijan U21	1	(0)
2024–	Azerbaijan	6	(0)
Medal record
Men's football
Representing Azerbaijan
Islamic Solidarity Games
Bronze medal – third place	2021 Konya
- * Club domestic league appearances and goals as of 28 April 2026 ‡ National team caps and goals as of 10 June 2025

Rza Jafarov (Azerbaijani: Rza İsa oğlu Cəfərov; born 3 July 2003) is an Azerbaijani football player who plays as a goalkeeper for Qabala, on loan from Neftçi, and the Azerbaijan national team.

== Club career ==
On 27 January 2026, Neftçi announced that they had extended their contract with Jafarov until the summer of 2028, and that Jafarov had also joined Gabala on loan for the remainder of the season.

== International career ==
Jafarov made his debut for the senior Azerbaijan national team on 22 March 2024 in a friendly against Mongolia.

== Career statistics ==
As of match played 25 April 2026

Appearances and goals by club, season and competition
Club	Season	League			National Cup		Continental		Total	
Club	Season	Division	Apps	Goals	Apps	Goals	Apps	Goals	Apps	Goals
Neftchi Baku	2022–23	Azerbaijan Premier League	1	0	0	0	0	0	1	0
Neftchi Baku	2023–24	Azerbaijan Premier League	23	0	4	0	0	0	27	0
Neftchi Baku	2024–25	Azerbaijan Premier League	31	0	4	0	-		35	0
Neftchi Baku	2025–26	Azerbaijan Premier League	0	0	0	0	-		0	0
Neftchi Baku	Total		55	0	8	0	0	0	63	0
Gabala (loan)	2025–26	Azerbaijan Premier League	6	0	1	0	-		7	0
Career total			61	0	9	0	0	0	70	0

=== International ===
Azerbaijan
Year	Apps	Goals
2024	3	0
2025	3	0
Total	6	0

Statistics accurate as of match played 10 June 2025
