= Cəfərli, Gadabay =

Jafarli
- Azerbaijani: Cəfərli
- Location within Azerbaijan
- Coordinates: 40°34′N 45°38′E
- Country: Azerbaijan
- District: Gadabay
- Municipality: Daryurd
- Time zone: UTC+4 (AZT)
  - Summer (DST): UTC+5 (AZT)

Cəfərli (also, Jafarli) is a village in the Gadabay District of Azerbaijan. The village forms part of the municipality of Daryurd.
