= Filip Ozobić =

Azerbaijani footballer (born 1991)

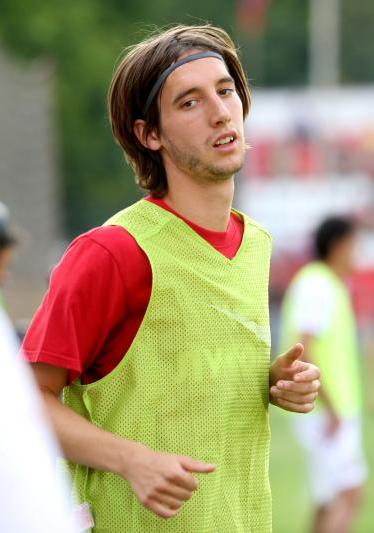
- Ozobić in 2010

Personal information
- Date of birth: 8 April 1991 (age 35)
- Place of birth: Bjelovar, SR Croatia, Yugoslavia
- Height: 1.75 m (5 ft 9 in)
- Position: Midfielder

Team information
- Current team: Mladost Ždralovi
- Number: 17

Youth career
- 2004–2006: Mladost Ždralovi
- 2006–2008: Dinamo Zagreb
- 2008–2009: Zadar
- 2009–2010: Spartak Moscow

Senior career*
Years	Team	Apps	(Gls)
2010–2013	Spartak Moscow	2	(0)
2012–2013	→ Hajduk Split (loan)	16	(0)
2013–2016	Slaven Belupo	71	(9)
2016–2018	Gabala	46	(16)
2018–2023	Qarabağ	120	(41)
2023–2025	Neftchi	58	(15)
2025–2026	Turan Tovuz	27	(6)
2026–	Mladost Ždralovi	11	(3)

International career^{‡}
2006–2007	Croatia U16	11	(2)
2006–2008	Croatia U17	13	(2)
2009	Croatia U18	4	(1)
2008–2010	Croatia U19	15	(3)
2008–2011	Croatia U20	9	(0)
2009–2011	Croatia U21	6	(0)
2017	Croatia	2	(0)
2021–	Azerbaijan	15	(1)
- * Club domestic league appearances and goals as of 12 November 2026 ‡ National team caps and goals as of 4 April 2024

Filip Ozobić (Azerbaijani: Filip Ozobiç; born 8 April 1991) is a professional footballer who plays for Prva NL club Mladost Ždralovi. Born in Croatia, Ozobić represented the Croatia national team in two friendly matches before switching FIFA nationality to represent the Azerbaijan national team.

== Club career ==
=== Early career ===
In January 2008, Spartak Moscow acquired Filip while he was still playing for Dinamo Zagreb's under-19 side. Spartak then immediately loaned him out to Croatian First Division side Zadar, where he spent the remainder of the 2007–08 and the 2008–09 seasons. He then returned to Spartak for the 2010–11 season and made his professional debut in the Russian Premier League on 28 November 2010 for Spartak Moscow. He made one further appearance that season and in the following first half of the next season. Croatian club HNK Hajduk Split then took Ozobić on a loan for the next 18 months where he largely failed to impress and spent most of the time as either a reserve or a substitute. He was released from his Spartak contract in summer 2013. NK Slaven Belupo, amid other sides, were interested in the player who was then a free agent and moved fastest, confirming his signing on 6 September 2013.

=== Gabala ===
On 11 June 2016, Ozobić signed a two-year contract with Azerbaijan Premier League side Gabala FK.

=== Qarabağ ===
Ozobić signed a three-year contract with Qarabağ FK on 2 June 2018 after his Gabala contract had expired. On 31 May 2023, Qarabağ announced that Ozobić had left the club following the expiration of his contract.

=== Neftçi ===
On 30 June 2023, Neftçi announced the signing of Ozobić to a two-year contract. On 24 June 2025, his contract with Neftçi expired and was not extended, and he left the club.

== International career ==
=== Croatia ===
From 2006, until 2011, Ozobić has been part of Croatia at youth international level, respectively has been part of the U16, U17, U18, U19, U20 and U21 teams and he with these teams played 58 matches and scored eight goals. In December 2016, he was named as part of the Croatia squad for 2017 China Cup. On 11 January 2017, Ozobić made his debut with Croatia in 2017 China Cup semi-final against Chile after being named in the starting line-up.

=== Azerbaijan ===
On 14 July 2021, the Association of Football Federations of Azerbaijan announced that FIFA had accepted Ozobić's request to play for Azerbaijan after staying in the country for almost five years. On 27 August 2021, he was called up to join the Azerbaijan national football team.

== Career statistics ==
=== Club ===
As of match played 9 February 2024

Appearances and goals by club, season and competition
Club	Season	League			Cup		Continental		Other		Total	
Club	Season	Division	Apps	Goals	Apps	Goals	Apps	Goals	Apps	Goals	Apps	Goals
Spartak Moscow	2010	Russian Premier League	1	0	0	0	1	0	—		2	0
Spartak Moscow	2011–12	Russian Premier League	1	0	0	0	0	0	—		1	0
Spartak Moscow	2012–13	Russian Premier League	0	0	0	0	0	0	—		0	0
Spartak Moscow	Total		2	0	0	0	1	0	—		3	0
Hajduk Split (loan)	2011–12	Prva HNL	10	0	0	0	0	0	—		10	0
Hajduk Split (loan)	2012–13	Prva HNL	6	0	0	0	3	0	—		9	0
Hajduk Split (loan)	Total		16	0	0	0	3	0	—		19	0
Slaven Belupo	2013–14	Prva HNL	14	2	5	2	—		2	2	21	6
Slaven Belupo	2014–15	Prva HNL	26	3	2	1	—				28	4
Slaven Belupo	2015–16	Prva HNL	31	4	6	1	—				37	5
Slaven Belupo	Total		71	9	13	4	—		2	2	86	15
Gabala	2016–17	Azerbaijan Premier League	27	11	4	2	14	2	—		45	15
Gabala	2017–18	Azerbaijan Premier League	19	5	6	4	4	1	—		29	10
Gabala	Total		46	16	10	6	18	3	—		74	25
Qarabağ	2018–19	Azerbaijan Premier League	26	8	4	0	13	1	—		43	9
Qarabağ	2019–20	Azerbaijan Premier League	5	1	0	0	3	1	—		8	2
Qarabağ	2020–21	Azerbaijan Premier League	20	11	0	0	8	1	—		28	12
Qarabağ	2021–22	Azerbaijan Premier League	24	11	4	0	13	1	—		41	12
Qarabağ	2022–23	Azerbaijan Premier League	20	3	0	0	10	3	—		30	6
Qarabağ	Total		95	34	8	0	47	7	—		150	41
Neftçi	2023–24	Azerbaijan Premier League	15	2	2	1	4	0	—		21	3
Career total			245	61	33	11	73	10	2	2	353	84

=== International ===
As of match played 25 March 2024

Appearances and goals by national team and year
National team	Year	Apps	Goals
Croatia	2017	2	0
Total		2	0
Azerbaijan	2021	7	0
Azerbaijan	2022	3	1
Azerbaijan	2023	3	0
Azerbaijan	2024	2	0
Total		15	1

==== International goals ====
No.	Date	Venue	Opponent	Score	Result	Competition
1.	25 September 2022	Dalga Arena, Baku, Azerbaijan	Kazakhstan	2–0	3–0	2022–23 UEFA Nations League C

== Honours ==
=== Club ===
Hajduk Split

- Croatian Cup: 2012–13

Qarabağ

- Azerbaijan Premier League: 2018–19, 2019–20, 2021–22, 2022–23

=== Individual ===
- Azerbaijan Premier League Top Scorer (1): 2016–17
