= Cəfərli, Agsu =

Cəfərli is a village and municipality in the Agsu District of Azerbaijan. It has a population of 474.
