= Ivan Brkić (footballer) =

Croatian footballer

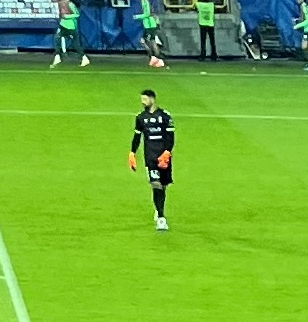
- Brkić in 2024 with Motor Lublin

Personal information
- Full name: Ivan Brkić
- Date of birth: 29 June 1995 (age 31)
- Place of birth: Koprivnica, Croatia
- Height: 1.94 m (6 ft 4 in)
- Position: Goalkeeper

Team information
- Current team: Legia Warsaw
- Number: 1

Youth career
- 2004–2009: Vojnić '95
- 2009–2013: Karlovac
- 2013–2014: Istra 1961

Senior career*
| Years | Team | Apps | (Gls) |
| 2014–2017 | Istra 1961 | 36 | (0) |
| 2017 | Lokomotiva | 0 | (0) |
| 2017 | → Imotski (loan) | 2 | (0) |
| 2017–2018 | Cibalia | 23 | (0) |
| 2018–2021 | Zrinjski Mostar | 53 | (0) |
| 2021 | Riga | 6 | (0) |
| 2022–2024 | Neftçi | 68 | (0) |
| 2024–2026 | Motor Lublin | 37 | (0) |
| 2026– | Legia Warsaw | 0 | (0) |

International career
| 2014–2015 | Croatia U21 | 2 | (0) |
- * Club domestic league appearances and goals as of 11:01, 14 May 2026 (UTC)

Ivan Brkić (born 29 June 1995) is a Croatian professional footballer who plays as a goalkeeper for Ekstraklasa club Legia Warsaw.

== Career ==
On 22 January 2022, Azerbaijan Premier League club Neftçi announced the signing of Brkić to an eighteen-month contract from Riga. On 5 June 2023, Neftçi announced that they had signed a new two-year contract Brkić. On 9 July 2024, Neftçi announced the departure of Brkić with the goalkeeper having played 68 times for the club.

On 9 July 2024, Brkić signed a two-year deal with Polish Ekstraklasa outfit Motor Lublin. He made starts in ten opening league games of the 2024–25 campaign, before having his season cut short by a knee injury suffered in training on 4 October 2024.

On 18 May 2026, fellow Ekstraklasa club Legia Warsaw announced the signing of Brkić to a three-year contract on a free transfer.

== Career statistics ==
As of match played 17 April 2026

Appearances and goals by club, season and competition
| Club | Season | League | | | National cup (Note: Includes Croatian Cup, Bosnia and Herzegovina Cup, Azerbaijan Cup) | | Continental | | Other | | Total | |
| Club | Season | Division | Apps | Goals | Apps | Goals | Apps | Goals | Apps | Goals | Apps | Goals |
|---|---|---|---|---|---|---|---|---|---|---|---|---|
| Istra 1961 | 2013–14 | 1. HNL | 4 | 0 | 0 | 0 | — | | — | | 4 | 0 |
| Istra 1961 | 2014–15 | 1. HNL | 21 | 0 | 1 | 0 | — | | — | | 22 | 0 |
| Istra 1961 | 2015–16 | 1. HNL | 10 | 0 | 2 | 0 | — | | 1 (Note: Appearance in Croatian First Football League relegation play-offs) | 0 | 13 | 0 |
| Istra 1961 | 2016–17 | 1. HNL | 1 | 0 | 0 | 0 | — | | — | | 1 | 0 |
| Istra 1961 | Total | | 36 | 0 | 3 | 0 | 0 | 0 | 1 | 0 | 40 | 0 |
| Lokomotiva | 2016–17 | 1. HNL | 0 | 0 | 0 | 0 | 0 | 0 | — | | 0 | 0 |
| Imotski (loan) | 2016–17 | 2. HNL | 2 | 0 | — | | — | | — | | 2 | 0 |
| Cibalia | 2017–18 | 1. HNL | 23 | 0 | 0 | 0 | — | | — | | 23 | 0 |
| Zrinjski Mostar | 2018–19 | Bosnian Premier League | 24 | 0 | 3 | 0 | 3 (Note: Appearances in UEFA Europa League) | 0 | — | | 30 | 0 |
| Zrinjski Mostar | 2019–20 | Bosnian Premier League | 16 | 0 | 0 | 0 | 6 | 0 | — | | 22 | 0 |
| Zrinjski Mostar | 2020–21 | Bosnian Premier League | 13 | 0 | 0 | 0 | 3 | 0 | — | | 16 | 0 |
| Zrinjski Mostar | Total | | 53 | 0 | 3 | 0 | 12 | 0 | — | | 68 | 0 |
| Riga | 2021 | Virsliga | 6 | 0 | 0 | 0 | 6 (Note: Appearances in UEFA Europa Conference League) | 0 | — | | 12 | 0 |
| Neftçi | 2021–22 | Azerbaijan Premier League | 11 | 0 | 4 | 0 | — | | — | | 15 | 0 |
| Neftçi | 2022–23 | Azerbaijan Premier League | 26 | 0 | 5 | 0 | 4 | 0 | — | | 35 | 0 |
| Neftçi | 2023–24 | Azerbaijan Premier League | 13 | 0 | 1 | 0 | 4 | 0 | — | | 18 | 0 |
| Neftçi | Total | | 50 | 0 | 10 | 0 | 8 | 0 | — | | 68 | 0 |
| Motor Lublin | 2024–25 | Ekstraklasa | 10 | 0 | 0 | 0 | — | | — | | 10 | 0 |
| Motor Lublin | 2025–26 | Ekstraklasa | 27 | 0 | 0 | 0 | — | | — | | 27 | 0 |
| Motor Lublin | Total | | 37 | 0 | 0 | 0 | — | | — | | 37 | 0 |
| Legia Warsaw | 2026–27 | Ekstraklasa | 0 | 0 | 0 | 0 | — | | — | | 0 | 0 |
| Career total | | | 207 | 0 | 16 | 0 | 26 | 0 | 1 | 0 | 250 | 0 |
