= Rahman Hajiyev (footballer) =

Azerbaijani footballer (born 1993)

Personal information
- Full name: Rahman Rahim oglu Hajiyev
- Date of birth: 25 July 1993 (age 33)
- Place of birth: Tovuz, Azerbaijan
- Height: 1.71 m (5 ft 7 in)
- Position: Midfielder

Team information
- Current team: Kapaz
- Number: 11

Youth career
- Baku

Senior career*
Years	Team	Apps	(Gls)
2009–2014	Baku	45	(2)
2014	→ Sumgayit (loan)	18	(3)
2014	→ Gaziantep BB (loan)	5	(0)
2015–2025	Neftçi	197	(21)
2020–2022	→ Keşla (loan)	44	(7)
2025	Sabail	10	(1)
2026–	Kapaz	16	(2)

International career^{‡}
2009–2010	Azerbaijan U17	3	(0)
2010–2011	Azerbaijan U19	8	(1)
2012–2014	Azerbaijan U21	3	(2)
2015–	Azerbaijan	9	(0)
- * Club domestic league appearances and goals as of 22 June 2026 ‡ National team caps and goals as of 4 May 2023

Rahman Rahim oglu Hajiyev (Azerbaijani: Rəhman Xudayət oğlu Hacıyev; born 25 July 1993) is an Azerbaijani professional footballer who plays as a midfielder for Kapaz in the Azerbaijan First League.

== Career ==
=== Club ===
On 8 July 2020, Keşla announced the signing of Hajiyev on one-year long loan.

=== International ===
On 17 November 2015 Hajiyev made his senior international debut for Azerbaijan game against Moldova.

== Career statistics ==
=== International ===
Azerbaijan
Year	Apps	Goals
2015	1	0
2016	2	0
2017	0	0
2018	4	0
Total	7	0

Statistics accurate as of match played 9 June 2018

== Honours ==
=== Club ===
Baku

- Azerbaijan Premier League
  - Winner (1): 2008–09
- Azerbaijan Cup
  - Winner (2): 2009–10, 2011–12
