= Erwin Koffi =

Ivorian footballer (born 1995)

Personal information
- Date of birth: 10 January 1995 (age 31)
- Place of birth: Paris, France
- Height: 1.75 m (5 ft 9 in)
- Position: Right-back

Team information
- Current team: Guingamp
- Number: 2

Youth career
- –2015: Châteauroux

Senior career*
Years	Team	Apps	(Gls)
2015	Châteauroux	3	(0)
2015–2018	Lorient	13	(0)
2018–2020	Anorthosis Famagusta	43	(1)
2020	Olympiakos Nicosia	8	(1)
2020–2023	Pau FC	107	(6)
2023–2025	Neftçi	64	(3)
2025–	Guingamp	22	(0)

International career
2016	Ivory Coast U23	1	(0)
- * Club domestic league appearances and goals as of 11 May 2026

Erwin Koffi (born 10 January 1995) is a professional footballer who plays as a right-back for Ligue 2 club Guingamp. Born in France, he is a former youth international for the Ivory Coast.

== Club career ==
On 14 May 2016, Koffi made his Ligue 1 debut against Gazélec Ajaccio.

On 25 July 2023, Koffi signed for Neftçi on a two-year contract. On 24 June 2025, Neftçi announced that Koffi had left the club after his contract wasn't renewed.

On 24 June 2025, Koffi joined Guingamp in Ligue 2 on a two-season contract.

== International career ==
Born in France and of Ivorian descent, Koffi represented the Ivory Coast U23s in a 2–0 friendly defeat to Burkina Faso U23 on 31 August 2016.

== Career statistics ==
=== Club ===
As of 24 November 2019

Appearances and goals by club, season and competition
Club	Season	League			Cup		Continental		Other		Total	
Club	Season	Division	Apps	Goals	Apps	Goals	Apps	Goals	Apps	Goals	Apps	Goals
Châteauroux	2014–15	Ligue 2	3	0	0	0	—		—		3	0
Lorient	2015–16	Ligue 2	1	0	0	0	—		0	0	1	0
Lorient	2016–17	Ligue 1	12	0	1	0	—		0	0	13	0
Lorient	2017–18	Ligue 2	0	0	0	0	—		1	0	1	0
Lorient	Total		13	0	1	0	—		1	0	15	0
Anorthosis Famagusta	2017–18	Cypriot First Division	15	0	2	1	—		—		17	1
Anorthosis Famagusta	2018–19	Cypriot First Division	25	1	3	0	2	0	—		30	1
Anorthosis Famagusta	2019–20	Cypriot First Division	3	0	0	0	—		—		3	0
Anorthosis Famagusta	Total		43	1	5	1	2	0	—		50	2
Career total			59	1	6	1	2	0	1	0	68	2
