= Mudo Valdez =

Paraguayan football player (born 1993)

Diego Valdez
Personal information
- Full name: Diego Gabriel Valdez Samudio
- Date of birth: 14 November 1993 (age 33)
- Place of birth: Asunción, Paraguay
- Height: 1.81 m (5 ft 11 in)
- Position: Midfielder

Team information
- Current team: Sportivo Ameliano
- Number: 5

Youth career
- 2011–2012: Rubio Ñu
- 2012–2013: Herreros Bueno
- 2013–2016: Deportivo Capiatá

Senior career*
Years	Team	Apps	(Gls)
2016–2019	Sportivo San Lorenzo	16	(1)
2019–2021	Atlético San Luis	3	(1)
2020–2021	→ Sol de América (loan)	51	(11)
2022	Guaraní	11	(0)
2023	Guaireña	18	(3)
2023–2024	Neftçi	23	(3)
2024	Sol de América	18	(1)
2025–	Sportivo Ameliano	21	(2)

International career^{‡}
2019–	Paraguay	1	(0)
- * Club domestic league appearances and goals as of 13 August 2025 ‡ National team caps and goals as of 6 April 2019

Diego Gabriel Valdez Samudio (born 14 November 1993), known as Mudo Valdez (Spanish, the mute), is a Paraguayan professional footballer who plays as a midfielder for Sportivo Ameliano.

== Professional career ==
Valdez spent his early career in the lower leagues of Paraguay with Rubio Ñu, Herreros Bueno, and Deportivo Capiatá before moving to Sportivo San Lorenzo in 2016. He made his professional debut with Sportivo San Lorenzo in a 1-0 Paraguayan Primera División win over Club River Plate on 22 January 2019.

On 28 August 2023, Azerbaijan Premier League club Neftçi announced the signing of Valdez to a one-year contract with the option of a second. On 24 July 2024, Neftçi announced the departure of Valdez after the option on his contract wasn't taken up.

== International career ==
Valdez made his debut for the Paraguay national football team in a friendly 1–0 loss to Peru on 22 March 2019.

== Personal life ==
Valdez received the nickname "El Mudo" (Spanish for mute) from his coach, Xavi Roura, for how quiet Valdez was.
