= Zira FK in European football =

Overview of Zira FK's role in European football

Zira FK in European Football
- Club: Zira FK
- Seasons played: 5
- Most appearances: Qismət Alıyev (16)
- Top scorer: Raphael Utzig (5); Davit Volkovi (5)
- First entry: 2017–18 UEFA Europa League
- Latest entry: 2026–27 UEFA Conference League

Zira FK have participated in 4 editions of the club competitions governed by UEFA, the chief authority for football across Europe.

== History ==
=== Matches ===
As of match played 30 July 2026

Season	Competition	Round	Club	Home	Away	Aggregate
2017–18	UEFA Europa League	1QR	(Luxembourg) Differdange 03	2–0	2–1	4–1
2017–18	UEFA Europa League	2QR	(Romania) Astra Giurgiu	0–0	1–3	1–3
2022–23	UEFA Europa Conference League	2QR	(Israel) Maccabi Tel Aviv	0–3	0–0	0–3
2024–25	UEFA Europa League	1QR	(Moldova) Sheriff Tiraspol	1–2 (a.e.t.)	1−0	2–2 (4–5 p)
2024–25	UEFA Conference League	2QR	(Slovakia) DAC Dunajská Streda	4–0	2–1	6–1
2024–25	UEFA Conference League	3QR	(Croatia) Osijek	2–2 (a.e.t.)	1–1	3–3 (2–1 p)
2024–25	UEFA Conference League	POR	(Cyprus) Omonia	1–0	0–6	1–6
2025–26	UEFA Conference League	2QR	(Croatia) Hajduk Split	1–1	1–2	2–3
2026–27	UEFA Conference League	1QR	(Georgia (country)) Torpedo Kutaisi	3–0	3–0	6–0
2026–27	UEFA Conference League	2QR	(Estonia) Paide Linnameeskond	1–1	0–1	1–2

Notes

- 1Q: First qualifying round
- 2Q: Second qualifying round
- 3Q: Third qualifying round
- PO: Play-off round
- Group: Group stage

== Player statistics ==
=== Appearances ===
As of match played 23 July 2026

	Name	Years	UEFA Europa League	UEFA Conference League	Total	Ratio
1	(Azerbaijan) Qismət Alıyev	2020-Present	2 (0)	14 (2)	16 (2)	0.13
2	(Brazil) Ruan Renato	2023-Present	2 (0)	12 (2)	14 (2)	0.14
2	(Georgia (country)) Davit Volkovi	2020-2022, 2024-Present	2 (1)	12 (4)	14 (5)	0.36
4	(Rwanda) Ange Mutsinzi	2024-Present	2 (0)	11 (0)	13 (0)	0
5	(Brazil) Martins Júnior	2024-2026	1 (0)	11 (1)	12 (1)	0.08
5	(Azerbaijan) İsmayıl İbrahimli	2023-2025, 2025-Present	2 (0)	10 (0)	12 (0)	0
5	(Niger) Issa Djibrilla	2023-Present	2 (0)	10 (1)	12 (1)	0.08
8	(Azerbaijan) Hacıağa Hacılı	2020-2023, 2023-Present	2 (0)	9 (0)	11 (0)	0
9	(Portugal) Tiago Silva	2023-2026	2 (0)	8 (0)	10 (0)	0
9	(Azerbaijan) Ceyhun Nuriyev	2023-2026	2 (0)	8 (0)	10 (0)	0
11	(Brazil) Raphael Utzig	2024-Present	2 (1)	6 (4)	8 (5)	0.63
12	(Ukraine) Eldar Kuliyev	2023-2026	2 (0)	6 (0)	8 (0)	0
13	(Azerbaijan) Rustam Akhmedzade	2022-2025	2 (0)	6 (0)	8 (0)	0
14	(Ivory Coast) Pierre Zebli	2023-Present	2 (0)	5 (0)	7 (0)	0
14	(Georgia (country)) Giorgi Papunashvili	2024-Present	0 (0)	7 (0)	7 (0)	0
16	(Azerbaijan) Magsad Isayev	2023-Present	0 (0)	6 (0)	6 (0)	0
17	(Azerbaijan) Fuad Bayramov	2023-2024, 2024-Present	1 (0)	4 (0)	5 (0)	0
17	(Guinea) Salifou Soumah	2023-Present	2 (0)	3 (0)	5 (0)	0
17	(Ivory Coast) Stephane Acka	2023-2026	2 (0)	3 (0)	5 (0)	0
17	(Mozambique) Guima	2025-Present	(-)	5 (0)	5 (0)	0
17	(France) Brahim Konaté	2025-2026	(-)	5 (1)	5 (1)	0.2
22	(Azerbaijan) Tamkin Khalilzade	2015-2017, 2021-2022	4 (0)	(-)	4 (0)	0
22	(Romania) Gabriel Matei	2017	4 (0)	(-)	4 (0)	0
22	(Serbia) Jovan Krneta	2015-2018, 2020	4 (0)	(-)	4 (0)	0
22	(Serbia) Milan Đurić	2016-2018	4 (0)	(-)	4 (0)	0
22	(Cameroon) Joseph Boum	2017-2018	4 (0)	(-)	4 (0)	0
22	(Azerbaijan) Anar Nazirov	2015-2019, 2021-Present	4 (0)	(-)	4 (0)	0
22	(Haiti) Kervens Belfort	2017	4 (1)	(-)	4 (1)	0.25
22	(Central African Republic) David Manga	2017-2018	4 (1)	(-)	4 (1)	0.25
22	(Azerbaijan) Rashad Sadiqov	2017	4 (1)	(-)	4 (1)	0.25
22	(Ghana) Richard Gadze	2017, 2017-2018, 2019-2020	4 (2)	(-)	4 (2)	0.5
22	(Nigeria) Abbas Ibrahim	2023-2025	1 (0)	3 (0)	4 (0)	0
22	(Belarus) Yegor Bogomolsky	2025-Present	(-)	4 (0)	4 (0)	0
22	(Azerbaijan) Aydın Bayramov	2024-Present	(-)	4 (0)	4 (0)	0
22	(Azerbaijan) Amin Seydiyev	2026-Present	(-)	4 (1)	4 (1)	0.25
22	(Turkey) Eren Aydın	2026-Present	(-)	4 (3)	4 (3)	0.75
22	(Portugal) Vieirinha	2026-Present	(-)	4 (0)	4 (0)	0
38	(Nigeria) Victor Igbekoyi	2015-2018	3 (0)	(-)	3 (0)	0
38	(Azerbaijan) Orkhan Aliyev	2017-2018	3 (0)	(-)	3 (0)	0
38	(Azerbaijan) Vüqar Mustafayev	2016-2017, 2017-2019	3 (0)	(-)	3 (0)	0
41	(Azerbaijan) Nijat Gurbanov	2015-2016, 2017	2 (0)	(-)	2 (0)	0
41	(Azerbaijan) Aleksandr Shemonayev	2015-2018	2 (0)	(-)	2 (0)	0
41	(Azerbaijan) Adil Naghiyev	2015-2019	2 (0)	(-)	2 (0)	0
41	(Azerbaijan) Mekhti Dzhenetov	2021-2023	(-)	2 (0)	2 (0)	0
41	(Azerbaijan) Sertan Taşqın	2020-2023	(-)	2 (0)	2 (0)	0
41	(Belgium) Loris Brogno	2021-2023	(-)	2 (0)	2 (0)	0
41	(Azerbaijan) Ragim Sadykhov	2022-2024	(-)	2 (0)	2 (0)	0
41	(Azerbaijan) Rustam Akhmedzade	2022-2025	(-)	2 (0)	2 (0)	0
41	(France) Hamidou Keyta	2022-2023	(-)	2 (0)	2 (0)	0
41	(Azerbaijan) Slavik Alxasov	2022-2023	(-)	2 (0)	2 (0)	0
41	(Serbia) Nemanja Anđelković	2021-2023	(-)	2 (0)	2 (0)	0
41	(Greece) Dimitrios Chantakias	2020-2024	(-)	2 (0)	2 (0)	0
41	(Netherlands) Mo Hamdaoui	2021-2023	(-)	2 (0)	2 (0)	0
41	(Azerbaijan) Coşqun Diniyev	2021-2023	(-)	2 (0)	2 (0)	0
41	(Azerbaijan) İlkin Muradov	2017-2024	(-)	2 (0)	2 (0)	0
41	(Azerbaijan) Ramin Ahmedov	2021-2023	(-)	2 (0)	2 (0)	0
41	(Azerbaijan) Elchin Alijanov	2024-Present	0 (0)	2 (0)	2 (0)	0
41	(France) Iron Gomis	2024-2026	(-)	2 (0)	2 (0)	0
41	(Togo) Abdoul Aziz Batibie	2025-Present	(-)	2 (0)	2 (0)	0
41	(Azerbaijan) Rovlan Muradov	2025-2026	(-)	2 (0)	2 (0)	0
41	(Ivory Coast) Chris Digbeu	2026-Present	(-)	2 (0)	2 (0)	0
41	(Azerbaijan) Aykhan Guseynov	2026-Present	(-)	2 (0)	2 (0)	0
63	(Azerbaijan) Sadiq Quliyev	2015-2016, 2017-2019	1 (0)	(-)	1 (0)	0
63	(Brazil) Filipe Pachtmann	2021-2022, 2022-2025	(-)	1 (0)	1 (0)	0
63	(Azerbaijan) Cəlal Hüseynov	2020-2023	(-)	1 (0)	1 (0)	0
63	(Ivory Coast) Bayéré Junior Loué	2026-Present	(-)	1 (0)	1 (0)	0

=== Goalscorers ===
As of match played 30 July 2026

	Name	Years	UEFA Europa League	UEFA Conference League	Total	Ratio
1	(Brazil) Raphael Utzig	2024-2026	1 (2)	4 (6)	5 (8)	0.63
1	(Georgia (country)) Davit Volkovi	2020-2022, 2024-Present	1 (2)	4 (12)	5 (14)	0.36
3	(Turkey) Eren Aydın	2026-Present	(-)	3 (4)	3 (4)	0.75
4	(Ghana) Richard Gadze	2017, 2017-2018, 2019-2020	2 (4)	(-)	2 (4)	0.5
4	(Azerbaijan) Qismət Alıyev	2020-Present	0 (2)	2 (13)	2 (15)	0.13
4	(Brazil) Ruan Renato	2023-Present	0 (2)	2 (12)	2 (14)	0.14
7	(Haiti) Kervens Belfort	2017	1 (4)	(-)	1 (4)	0.25
7	(Central African Republic) David Manga	2017-2018	1 (4)	(-)	1 (4)	0.25
7	(Azerbaijan) Rashad Sadiqov	2017	1 (4)	(-)	1 (4)	0.25
7	(Brazil) Martins Júnior	2024-2026	0 (1)	1 (10)	1 (11)	0.09
7	(France) Brahim Konaté	2025-2026	(-)	1 (5)	1 (5)	0.2
7	(Niger) Issa Djibrilla	2023-Present	0 (2)	1 (10)	1 (12)	0.08
7	(Azerbaijan) Amin Seydiyev	2026-Present	(-)	1 (4)	1 (4)	0.25

=== Clean sheets ===
As of match played 30 July 2026

	Name	Years	UEFA Europa League	UEFA Conference League	Total	Ratio
1	(Portugal) Tiago Silva	2023-2026	1 (2)	2 (8)	3 (10)	0.3
2	(Azerbaijan) Anar Nazirov	2015-2019, 2021-Present	2 (4)	(-)	2 (4)	0.5
2	(Azerbaijan) Aydın Bayramov	2024-Present	(-)	2 (4)	2 (4)	0.5
4	(Azerbaijan) Mekhti Dzhenetov	2021-2023	(-)	1 (2)	1 (2)	0.5

== Overall record ==
=== By competition ===
As of match played 30 July 2026

Competition	Pld	W	D	L	GF	GA
UEFA Europa League	6	3	1	2	7	6
UEFA Conference League	14	5	5	4	19	18
Total	20	8	6	6	26	24

=== By country ===
As of match played 30 July 2026

Country	Pld	W	D	L	GF	GA	GD	Win%
Croatia	4	0	3	1	5	6	−1	0.00
Cyprus	2	1	0	1	1	6	−5	50.00
Estonia	2	0	1	1	1	2	−1	0.00
Georgia	2	2	0	0	6	0	+6	100.00
Israel	2	0	1	1	0	3	−3	0.00
Luxembourg	2	2	0	0	4	1	+3	100.00
Moldova	2	1	0	1	2	2	+0	50.00
Romania	2	0	1	1	1	3	−2	0.00
Slovakia	2	2	0	0	6	1	+5	100.00

=== By club ===
As of match played 30 July 2026

Opponent	Played	Won	Drawn	Lost	For	Against	Difference	Ratio
(Croatia) Hajduk Split	2	0	1	1	2	3	−1	0.00
(Croatia) Osijek	2	0	2	0	3	3	+0	0.00
(Cyprus) AC Omonia	2	1	0	1	1	6	−5	50.00
(Estonia) Paide Linnameeskond	2	0	1	1	1	2	−1	0.00
(Georgia (country)) Torpedo Kutaisi	2	2	0	0	6	0	+6	100.00
(Israel) Maccabi Tel Aviv	2	0	1	1	0	3	−3	0.00
(Luxembourg) Differdange 03	2	2	0	0	4	1	+3	100.00
(Moldova) Sheriff Tiraspol	2	1	0	1	2	2	+0	50.00
(Romania) Astra Giurgiu	2	0	1	1	1	3	−2	0.00
(Slovakia) DAC 1904	2	2	0	0	6	1	+5	100.00
