= 2024–25 Zira FK season =

Zira FK
2024–25 season
- Manager: Rashad Sadygov
- Stadium: Zira Olympic Sport Complex Stadium
- Azerbaijan Premier League: 2nd
- Azerbaijan Cup: Quarter-final
- UEFA Europa League: First qualifying round
- UEFA Conference League: Play-off round
- Top goalscorer: League: Salifou Soumah (12); All: Davit Volkovi (15)
- Biggest defeat: Omonia 6–0 Zira

The 2024–25 season was the eleventh in the history of Zira FK and the tenth consecutive season in the Azerbaijan Premier League. Besides the domestic league, Zira participated in the Azerbaijan Cup, the UEFA Europa League, and the UEFA Conference League.

== Season events ==
On 4 June, Zira announced the permanent signing of Fuad Bayramov from Shamakhi after he'd played for the club on loan the previous season. The next day, 5 June, Zira announced the singing of Aydın Bayramov from Turan Tovuz and Elchin Alijanov from Kapaz.

On 13 June, Zira announced that they had signed Davit Volkovi from Sabah and that Ismayil Ibrahimli and Rustam Akhmedzade had both extended their loan deals with the club from Qarabağ.

On 15 June, Zira announced the signing of Martins Júnior from Kapaz.

On 1 July, Zira announced the signing of Ange Mutsinzi from Jerv.

On 3 August, Zira announced the signing of Giorgi Papunashvili from Kapaz.

On 3 September, Zira announced the signing of Iron Gomis from Kasımpaşa.

On 10 September, Zira announced the signing of Yusuf Lawal from Arouca, and Ildar Alekperov from Sabah.

On 19 February, Zira announced that Filipe Pachtmann had left the club after his contract was ended by mutual agreement.

On 8 March, Zira announced the signing of Guima from Iğdır on a contract until the summer of 2027.

== Squad ==
As of match played 25 May 2025

No.	Name	Nationality	Position	Date of birth (age)	Signed from	Signed in	Contract ends	Apps.	Goals
Goalkeepers
13	Aydın Bayramov	(Azerbaijan)	GK	18 February 1996 (aged 29)	Turan Tovuz	2024	2026	33	0
41	Anar Nazirov	(Azerbaijan)	GK	8 September 1985 (aged 39)	Gabala	2021		26	0
97	Tiago Silva	(Portugal)	GK	28 March 2000 (aged 25)	Trofense	2023	2025 (+1)	53	0
Defenders
3	Ange Mutsinzi	(Rwanda)	DF	15 November 1997 (aged 27)	Jerv	2024	2027	42	0
4	Ruan Renato	(Brazil)	DF	14 January 1994 (aged 31)	Gabala	2023	2025	84	6
5	Stephane Acka	(Ivory Coast)	DF	11 October 1990 (aged 34)	Sektzia Ness Ziona	2023	2024 (+1)	50	0
7	Magsad Isayev	(Azerbaijan)	DF	7 June 1994 (aged 30)	Gabala	2023	2025	64	1
14	Elchin Alijanov	(Azerbaijan)	DF	15 July 1999 (aged 25)	Kapaz	2024	2026	21	1
16	Fuad Bayramov	(Azerbaijan)	DF	20 May 1998 (aged 27)	Shamakhi	2024		50	2
Midfielders
6	Eldar Kuliyev	(Ukraine)	MF	24 March 2002 (aged 23)	Mynai	2023	2026	86	2
8	Ismayil Ibrahimli	(Azerbaijan)	MF	13 February 1998 (aged 27)	on loan from Qarabağ	2023	2025	74	2
10	Giorgi Papunashvili	(Georgia (country))	MF	2 September 1995 (aged 29)	Kapaz	2024	2025 (+1)	33	7
15	Pierre Zebli	(Ivory Coast)	MF	12 July 1997 (aged 27)	Lokomotiv Plovdiv	2023	2025 (+1)	69	0
17	Iron Gomis	(France)	MF	9 November 1999 (aged 25)	Kasımpaşa	2024	2026	29	1
18	Martins Júnior	(Brazil)	MF	7 November 1999 (aged 25)	Kapaz	2024	2027	30	4
19	Salifou Soumah	(Guinea)	MF	3 October 2003 (aged 21)	Le Havre	2023	2025	82	18
21	Hajiagha Hajili	(Azerbaijan)	MF	30 January 1998 (aged 27)	Qarabağ	2023	2025	125	0
24	Yusuf Lawal	(Nigeria)	MF	23 March 1998 (aged 27)	Arouca	2024	2026 (+1)	10	1
29	Ceyhun Nuriyev	(Azerbaijan)	MF	30 March 2001 (aged 24)	Sabah	2023	2026	63	6
30	Guima	(Mozambique)	MF	14 November 1995 (aged 29)	Iğdır	2025	2027	4	0
32	Qismət Alıyev	(Azerbaijan)	MF	24 October 1996 (aged 28)	Gabala	2020		174	13
48	Ramiz Muradov	(Azerbaijan)	MF	6 July 2005 (aged 19)	Unattached	2025		1	0
	Omar Gurbanov	(Azerbaijan)	MF	6 April 2005 (aged 20)	Neftçi	2023		0	0
Forwards
11	Rustam Akhmedzade	(Azerbaijan)	FW	25 December 2000 (aged 24)	on loan from Qarabağ	2022	2025	96	8
23	Raphael Utzig	(Brazil)	FW	8 August 1996 (aged 28)	Chungnam Asan	2024	2025	61	19
70	Issa Djibrilla	(Niger)	FW	1 January 1996 (aged 29)	Ankara Keçiörengücü	2023		62	5
90	Davit Volkovi	(Georgia (country))	FW	3 June 1995 (aged 29)	Sabah	2024	2026	111	37
Out on loan
Left during the season
22	Ildar Alekperov	(Azerbaijan)	MF	27 April 2001 (aged 24)	Sabah	2024	2026 (+1)	3	0
28	Abbas Ibrahim	(Nigeria)	MF	2 January 1998 (aged 27)	Paços de Ferreira	2023	2025 (+1)	43	1
	Filipe Pachtmann	(Brazil)	FW	11 April 2000 (aged 25)	Lviv	2022		23	3

== Transfers ==
=== In ===
Date	Position	Nationality	Name	From	Fee	Ref.
4 June 2024	MF	(Azerbaijan)	Fuad Bayramov	Shamakhi	Undisclosed	
5 June 2024	GK	(Azerbaijan)	Aydın Bayramov	Turan Tovuz	Undisclosed	
5 June 2024	DF	(Azerbaijan)	Elchin Alijanov	Kapaz	Undisclosed	
13 June 2024	MF	(Azerbaijan)	Ismayil Ibrahimli	Qarabağ	Undisclosed	
13 June 2024	FW	(Georgia (country))	Davit Volkovi	Sabah	Undisclosed	
15 June 2024	MF	(Brazil)	Martins Júnior	Kapaz	Undisclosed	
1 July 2024	DF	(Rwanda)	Ange Mutsinzi	Jerv	Undisclosed	
3 August 2024	MF	(Georgia (country))	Giorgi Papunashvili	Kapaz	Undisclosed	
3 September 2024	MF	(France)	Iron Gomis	Kasımpaşa	Undisclosed	
10 September 2024	MF	(Nigeria)	Yusuf Lawal	Arouca	Undisclosed	
10 September 2024	MF	(Azerbaijan)	Ildar Alekperov	Sabah	Undisclosed	
8 March 2025	MF	(Mozambique)	Guima	Iğdır	Undisclosed	

=== Loans in ===
Date from	Position	Nationality	Name	From	Date to	Ref.
13 June 2024	FW	(Azerbaijan)	Rustam Akhmedzade	Qarabağ	End of the season	

=== Released ===
Date	Position	Nationality	Name	Joined	Date	Ref
5 January 2025	MF	(Nigeria)	Abbas Ibrahim	AF Elbasani	7 January 2025	
19 February 2025	FW	(Brazil)	Filipe Pachtmann			

== Competitions ==
=== Overall record ===
Competition	First match	Last match	Starting round	Final position	Record							
Competition	First match	Last match	Starting round	Final position	Pld	W	D	L	GF	GA	GD	Win %
Premier League	4 August 2024	25 May 2025	Matchday 1	2nd	36	23	5	8	59	27	+32	63.89
Azerbaijan Cup	3 December 2024	28 February 2025	Round of 16	Quarter-final	3	1	0	2	3	4	−1	33.33
UEFA Europa League	11 July 2024	18 July 2024	First qualifying round	First qualifying round	2	1	0	1	2	2	+0	50.00
UEFA Conference League	25 July 2024	29 August 2024	Second qualifying round	Play-off round	6	3	2	1	10	10	+0	50.00
Total					47	28	7	12	74	43	+31	59.57

Last updated: 25 May 2025
Source: Competitions

=== Premier League ===
==== League table ====
Pos	Team	Pld	W	D	L	GF	GA	GD	Pts	Qualification or relegation
1	Qarabağ (C)	36	28	5	3	86	19	+67	89	Qualification for the Champions League second qualifying round (Note: Since already qualified Paris Saint-Germain won the Champions League, Qarabağ was promoted to the Champions League second qualifying round as one of the two champions with the highest coefficient in Champions League qualifying.)
2	Zira	36	23	5	8	59	27	+32	74	Qualification for the Conference League second qualifying round
3	Araz-Naxçıvan	36	15	13	8	34	29	+5	58	Qualification for the Conference League second qualifying round
4	Turan Tovuz	36	14	13	9	45	39	+6	55	
5	Sabah	36	10	18	8	50	46	+4	48	Qualification for the Europa League first qualifying round (Note: Sabah qualified for the Europa League first qualifying round as the 2024–25 Azerbaijan Cup winners.)

Source: Soccerway
Rules for classification: 1) Points; 2) Matches won; 3) Goal difference; 4) Goals scored; 5) Head-to-head points; 6) Head-to-head goal difference; 7) Lower number of points based on yellow and red cards; 8) Draw.
(C) Champions

==== Results summary ====
Overall								Home						Away					
Pld	W	D	L	GF	GA	GD	Pts	W	D	L	GF	GA	GD	W	D	L	GF	GA	GD
36	23	5	8	59	27	+32	74	11	3	4	31	14	+17	12	2	4	28	13	+15

Last updated: 25 May 2025.

==== Results by round ====
Round	1	2	4	5	6	7	8	9	10	11	12	3	13	14	15	16	17	18	19	20	21	22	23	24	25	26	27	28	29	30	31	32	33	34	35	36
Ground	H	A	H	H	H	A	H	A	H	A	A	H	A	A	H	A	H	A	H	A	H	H	A	H	A	H	A	H	A	A	H	A	H	A	H	A
Result	W	W	L	L	W	W	W	L	D	D	W	L	L	L	W	W	D	W	W	W	W	L	W	W	W	W	D	W	L	W	W	W	W	W	D	W
Position	2	2	5	5	5	5	3	4	4	4	4	3	4	4	4	4	4	4	3	3	3	3	3	3	2	2	2	2	2	2	2	2	2	2	2	2

Updated to match(es) played on 25 May 2025. Source:
A = Away; H = Home; W = Win; D = Draw; L = Loss

==== Matches ====
The league schedule was released on 19 July 2024.

4 August 2024 1	Zira	4–1	Sabail	Zirə
20:00 AZT (UTC+4)	Volkovi 12', 27', 45'; Djibrilla 90+4'	Report	Bouali (yellow card) 45' (goal) 49'; Larrucea (yellow card) 58'	Stadium: Zira Olympic Sport Complex Stadium; Attendance: 750; Referee: Rəvan Həmzəzadə

11 August 2024 2	Sabah	0–2	Zira	Masazir
21:00 AZT (UTC+4)	Lepinjica (yellow card) 13'	Report	Utzig (yellow card) 40' (goal) 50' (pen.); Soumah 52'; Akhmedzade (yellow card) 53'; Acka (yellow card) 79'	Stadium: Bank Respublika Arena; Attendance: 1,350; Referee: Əliyar Ağayev

25 August 2024 4	Zira	0–1	Shamakhi	Zirə
20:30 AZT (UTC+4)	Kuliyev (yellow card) 88'; Ibrahim (yellow card) 90'	Report	Mickels 16'; Muradov (yellow card) 23'; Pusi (yellow card) 69'; Naghiyev (yellow card) 73'	Stadium: Zira Olympic Sport Complex Stadium; Attendance: 650; Referee: Kamal Umudlu

1 September 2024 5	Zira	1–3	Qarabağ	Zirə
20:45 AZT (UTC+4)	Nuriyev 40'; Akhmedzade (yellow card) 88'	Report	Bayramov 18'; Addai 33'; Zoubir 88'	Stadium: Zira Olympic Sport Complex Stadium; Attendance: 1,200; Referee: İnqilab Məmmədov

15 September 2024 6	Zira	2–0	Neftçi	Zirə
18:00 AZT (UTC+4)	Soumah 1'; Utzig 60' (yellow card) 80'; Zebli (yellow card) 76'	Report	Seck (yellow card) 90'	Stadium: Zira Olympic Sport Complex Stadium; Attendance: 800; Referee: Elçin Məsiyev

22 September 2024 7	Sumqayit	0–2	Zira	Sumgait
20:30 AZT (UTC+4)	Mustafayev (yellow card) 23'; Nimely (yellow card) 35'; Muradov (yellow card) 79'	Report	Utzig 22' (pen.), 69'; Kuliyev (yellow card) 53'; Renato (yellow card) 85'	Stadium: City Stadium; Attendance: 1,200; Referee: İnqilab Məmmədov

28 September 2024 8	Zira	3–0	Kapaz	Zirə
17:00 AZT (UTC+4)	Soumah (yellow card) 17'; Nuriyev 42'; Akhmedzade 51'; Volkovi 57'	Report	Samadov (yellow card) 38'	Stadium: Zira Olympic Sport Complex Stadium; Attendance: 500; Referee: Rauf Cabarov

6 October 2024 9	Turan Tovuz	1–0	Zira	Tovuz
17:45 AZT (UTC+4)	Hajiyev 89'; Ahmadov (yellow card) 90'; Zulfugarli (yellow card) 90+3'	Report	Isayev (yellow card) 90+4'	Stadium: City Stadium; Attendance: 4,000; Referee: Rəvan Həmzəzadə

20 October 2024 10	Zira	1–1	Sabah	Zirə
17:30 AZT (UTC+4)	Isayev (yellow card) 45'; Papunashvili 90+1'	Report	Sekidika 7' (yellow card) 43'	Stadium: Zira Olympic Sport Complex Stadium; Attendance: 800; Referee: Rəşad Əhmədov

26 October 2024 11	Araz-Naxçıvan	1–1	Zira	Baku
16:00 AZT (UTC+4)	Wanderson (yellow card) 41'; Rodrigues (yellow card) 49'; Santos 89' (pen.)	Report	Papunashvili (yellow card) 30'	Stadium: Liv Bona Dea Arena; Attendance: 80; Referee: Əliyar Ağayev

2 November 2024 12	Shamakhi	0–2	Zira	Shamakhi
15:00 AZT (UTC+4)	Muradov (yellow card) 29'; Pusi (yellow card) 47'; Konaté (yellow card) 60'	Report	Nuriyev (yellow card) 24'; Júnior (yellow card) 26' (goal) 33'; Bakić 63' (o.g.)	Stadium: City Stadium; Attendance: 1,000; Referee: İnqilab Məmmədov

6 November 2024 3	Zira	0–1	Araz-Naxçıvan	Zirə
19:00 AZT (UTC+4)	Renato (yellow card) 57'; Kuliyev (yellow card) 68'	Report	Buludov (yellow card) 35'; Abbasov 48' (yellow card) 88'; Ahmadzada (yellow card) 68'; Wanderson (yellow card) 80'; Mustafayev (yellow card) 90+1'; Avram (yellow card) 90+4'	Stadium: Zira Olympic Sport Complex Stadium; Attendance: 450; Referee: Rauf Cabarov

10 November 2024 13	Qarabağ	4–0	Zira	Baku
19:00 AZT (UTC+4)	Silva 2'; Benzia 52' (pen.); Mustafazade 59'; Romão (yellow card) 61'; Kashchuk 68'	Report	Isayev (yellow card) 26'; Acka (yellow card) 85'	Stadium: Republican Stadium; Attendance: 900; Referee: Fərid Hacıyev

23 November 2024 14	Neftçi	2–1	Zira	Baku
19:00 AZT (UTC+4)	Guzzo (yellow card) 22'; Ozobić 28'; Safarov 68'; Kuč (yellow card) 78'	Report	Djibrilla 51'; Alıyev (yellow card) 79'	Stadium: Neftçi Arena; Attendance: 1,174; Referee: Kamal Umudlu

30 November 2024 15	Zira	4–1	Sumgayit	Zirə
17:00 AZT (UTC+4)	Volkovi 9', 66', 76'; Alijanov (yellow card) 28'; Papunashvili 55'	Report	Milović (yellow card) 21'; Vujnović 37'; Abdullazade (yellow card) 44'; Sadykhov (yellow card) 51'; Guliyev (yellow card) 62'; Mustafayev (yellow card) 86'	Stadium: Zira Olympic Sport Complex Stadium; Attendance: 500; Referee: Rəşad Əhmədov

8 December 2024 16	Kapaz	0–4	Zira	Tovuz
16:00 AZT (UTC+4)	Aliyev (yellow card) 40'	Report	Soumah 32'; Papunashvili 45+2'; Djibrilla 47'; Alijanov 73'	Stadium: City Stadium; Attendance: 150; Referee: Tural Qurbanov

15 December 2024 17	Zira	0–0	Turan Tovuz	Zirə
16:00 AZT (UTC+4)		Report		Stadium: Zira Olympic Sport Complex Stadium; Attendance: 750; Referee: Rauf Cabarov

21 December 2024 18	Sabail	0–1	Zira	Bayil
20:00 AZT (UTC+4)		Report	Ibrahimli (yellow card) 43'; Papunashvili 77'	Stadium: Bayil Arena; Attendance: 200; Referee: Elçin Məsiyev

18 January 2025 19	Zira	1–0	Araz-Naxçıvan	Zirə
16:00 AZT (UTC+4)	Ibrahimli 4'; Utzig (yellow card) 45'; Isayev (yellow card) 69'	Report	Qarayev (yellow card) 45'; Santos (yellow card) 84'	Stadium: Zira Olympic Sport Complex Stadium; Attendance: 700; Referee: Əliyar Ağayev

24 January 2025 20	Shamakhi	1–2	Zira	Shamakhi
14:00 AZT (UTC+4)	Konaté 38'	Report	Renato (yellow card) 13' (goal) 45+2'; Soumah 49'; Bayramov (yellow card) 86'; Zebli (yellow card) 90+5'	Stadium: City Stadium; Attendance: 1,100; Referee: İnqilab Məmmədov

2 February 2025 21	Zira	3–2	Qarabağ	Zirə
19:00 AZT (UTC+4)	Zebli (yellow card) 35'; Júnior (yellow card) 45+4'; Soumah 56', 67'; Volkovi 90'; Ibrahimli (yellow card) 90+3'	Report	Kashchuk 20'; P.Andrade 42' (yellow card) 77'; Bayramov (yellow card) 51'	Stadium: Zira Olympic Sport Complex Stadium; Attendance: 1,000; Referee: Rəvan Həmzəzadə

10 February 2025 22	Zira	1–2	Neftçi	Zirə
19:00 AZT (UTC+4)	Gomis (yellow card) 52'; Renato 90+1' (yellow card) 90+3'	Report	Salahlı (yellow card) 18'; Mahmudov 88'; Koffi 90+3'	Stadium: Zira Olympic Sport Complex Stadium; Attendance: 1,000; Referee: Əliyar Ağayev

15 February 2025 23	Sumgayit	0–3	Zira	Sumgait
19:00 AZT (UTC+4)	Mossi (yellow card) 80'	Report	Utzig 14'; Soumah 36', 65'; Hajili (yellow card) 87'	Stadium: City Stadium; Attendance: 1,300; Referee: Kamal Umudlu

24 February 2025 24	Zira	2–0	Kapaz	Zirə
17:00 AZT (UTC+4)	Utzig 62' (yellow card) 90'; Alıyev (yellow card) 87'; Akhmedzade 90+3'	Report	Manafov (yellow card) 39'; Hüseynli (yellow card) 85'	Stadium: Zira Olympic Sport Complex Stadium; Attendance: 100; Referee: Rauf Cabarov
Note: Match postponed on 23 February due to adverse weather conditions.

4 March 2025 25	Turan Tovuz	0–2	Zira	Tovuz
18:00 AZT (UTC+4)	Serrano (yellow card) 81'	Report	Alıyev 5' (pen.); Djibrilla 57'; Gomis (yellow card) 82'	Stadium: City Stadium; Attendance: 4,500; Referee: Elçin Məsiyev

9 March 2025 26	Zira	1–0	Sabail	Zirə
17:30 AZT (UTC+4)	Renato 90+5'	Report	Allouch (red card) 74'; Guliyev (yellow card) 90+1'	Stadium: Zira Olympic Sport Complex Stadium; Attendance: 700; Referee: Tural Qurbanov

15 March 2025 27	Sabah	1–1	Zira	Masazir
19:30 AZT (UTC+4)	[[[Abdulakh Khaybulayev|Khaybulayev]] (yellow card) 31'; Sekidika 34'; Lepinjica (yellow card) 60'; Seydiyev (yellow card) 62'	Report	Volkovi 63'	Stadium: Bank Respublika Arena; Attendance: 1,000; Referee: Rəşad Əhmədov

30 March 2025 28	Zira	3–0	Shamakhi	Zirə
18:00 AZT (UTC+4)	Utzig (yellow card) 28' (goal) 53'; Ruan (yellow card) 68' (goal) 71'; Soumah 90+3'	Report		Stadium: Zira Olympic Sport Complex Stadium; Attendance: 800; Referee: Kamal Umudlu

6 April 2025 29	Qarabağ	1–0	Zira	Baku
19:30 AZT (UTC+4)	Kady 15'; Janković (yellow card) 51'	Report	Djibrilla (yellow card) 14'; Hacılı (yellow card) 22'; Gomis (yellow card) 60'	Stadium: Republican Stadium; Attendance: 800; Referee: İnqilab Məmmədov

13 April 2025 30	Neftçi	2–4	Zira	Baku
19:15 AZT (UTC+4)	Ozobić 9'; Kuč 24'; Matias (yellow card) 45'; Salahlı (yellow card) 56'; Fernandes (yellow card) 87'	Report	Utzig 43' (pen.), 75' (pen.); Ruan (yellow card) 44'; Volkovi 61'; Acka (yellow card) 75'; Nuriyev 77'	Stadium: Neftçi Arena; Attendance: 1,731; Referee: Rəşad Əhmədov

20 April 2025 31	Zira	3–1	Sumgayit	Zirə
19:00 AZT (UTC+4)	Papunashvili 6'; Ruan (yellow card) 30'; Júnior 45+1'; Soumah 89'; Mutsinzi (yellow card) 90+3'	Report	Abdikholikov 52'; Dias (yellow card) 63'	Stadium: Zira Olympic Sport Complex Stadium; Attendance: 650; Referee: Rauf Cabarov

26 April 2025 32	Kapaz	0–1	Zira	Tovuz
19:00 AZT (UTC+4)	Taghiyev (yellow card) 90+4'; Verdasca (yellow card) 90+5'	Report	Soumah 64'; İbrahimli (yellow card) 83'; Bayramov (yellow card) 90+5'	Stadium: City Stadium; Attendance: 500; Referee: Əliyar Ağayev

2 May 2025 33	Zira	1–0	Turan Tovuz	Zirə
20:00 AZT (UTC+4)	Soumah 48'; Nuriyev (yellow card) 50'; Utzig (yellow card) 52'; Alıyev (red card) 59'; Zebli (yellow card) 84'	Report	O.Aliyev (yellow card) 29'; Guseynov (yellow card) 56'; Yusifli (yellow card) 78'; Hurtado (yellow card) 90+3'	Stadium: Zira Olympic Sport Complex Stadium; Attendance: 1,200; Referee: Rəvan Həmzəzadə

10 May 2025 34	Sabail	0–1	Zira	Bayil
17:00 AZT (UTC+4)	Çelik (yellow card) 8'; Gomis (yellow card) 33'	Report	Kuliyev (yellow card) 33'; Nuriyev (yellow card) 72'; Volkovi 90+1'	Stadium: Bayil Arena; Attendance: 700; Referee: Tural Qurbanov

17 May 2025 35	Zira	1–1	Sabah	Zirə
17:00 AZT (UTC+4)	Papunashvili 26'	Report	Chakla (yellow card) 57'; Šafranko 68'	Stadium: Zira Olympic Sport Complex Stadium; Attendance: 1,000; Referee: Elçin Məsiyev

25 May 2025 36	Araz-Naxçıvan	0–1	Zira	Baku
19:30 AZT (UTC+4)	Ribeiro (yellow card) 60'; Ağalarov (yellow card) 90+3'	Report	Alıyev (yellow card) 9'; Guima (yellow card) 33'; Júnior 58'	Stadium: Liv Bona Dea Arena; Attendance: 200; Referee: Cavid Cəlilov

=== Azerbaijan Cup ===
4 December 2024 Last 16	Zira	3–1	Shamakhi	Zirə
19:00 AZT (UTC+4)	Gomis 12'; Nuriyev 24'; Lawal 52'; Hajili (yellow card) 55'	Report	Konaté 41'; Abbasov (yellow card) 69'	Stadium: Zira Olympic Sport Complex Stadium; Attendance: 400; Referee: Rauf Allahverdiyev

6 February 2025 Quarter-final 1st leg	Araz-Naxçıvan	1–0	Zira	Baku
16:00 AZT (UTC+4)	Abdullayev (yellow card) 51'; Benny 61' (pen.); Jatobá (yellow card) 86'	Report	Renato (yellow card) 75'; Júnior (yellow card) 81'; Alijanov (yellow card) 90+3'	Stadium: Liv Bona Dea Arena; Attendance: 100; Referee: Elçin Məsiyev

28 February 2025 Quarter-final 2nd leg	Zira	0–2 (0–3 agg.)	Araz-Naxçıvan	Zirə
16:00 AZT (UTC+4)	Alıyev (yellow card) 35'; Isayev (yellow card) 44'; Soumah (yellow card) 56'; Papunashvili (yellow card) 90+3'	Report	Santos 3' (pen.), 45' (pen.); Paro (yellow card) 80'; Wanderson (yellow card) 90+3'	Stadium: Zira Olympic Sport Complex Stadium; Attendance: 200; Referee: İnqilab Məmmədov

=== UEFA Europa League ===
==== Qualifying rounds ====
11 July 2024 First qualifying round 1st leg	Sheriff Tiraspol (Moldova)	0–1	(Azerbaijan) Zira	Tiraspol, Moldova
21:00 AZT (UTC+4)		Report	Zebli (yellow card) 31'; Acka (yellow card) 40'; Volkovi 88'	Stadium: Sheriff Arena; Attendance: 3,594; Referee: Alessandro Dudic (Switzerland)

18 July 2024 First qualifying round 2nd leg	Zira (Azerbaijan)	1–2 (a.e.t.) (2–2 agg.) (4–5 p)	(Moldova) Sheriff Tiraspol	Baku, Azerbaijan
21:00 AZT (UTC+4)	Utzig 5'; Soumah (red card) 40'; Akhmedzade (yellow card) 100'	Report	Pata (yellow card) 2'; Ademo (yellow card) 31'; Allach 54'; Yade 77'; Mija (yellow card) 90+2'	Stadium: Dalga Arena; Attendance: 4,700; Referee: Bulat Sariyev (Kazakhstan)
	Penalties
	Alıyev (penalty scored); Renato (penalty scored); Nuriyev (penalty scored); Ibrahimli (penalty scored); F. Bayramov (penalty missed)		(penalty scored) Badolo; (penalty scored) Akanbi; (penalty scored) Pata; (penalty scored) João Paulo; (penalty scored) Allach
Note: Zira played their home match at the Dalga Arena in Baku, instead of their regular stadium, the Zira Olympic Sport Complex Stadium, in Zirə, which did not meet UEFA requirements.

=== UEFA Conference League ===
==== Qualifying rounds ====
25 July 2024 Second qualifying round 1st leg	Zira (Azerbaijan)	4–0	(Slovakia) DAC Dunajská Streda	Baku, Azerbaijan
19:30 AZT (UTC+4)	Utzig 29'; Júnior 31'; Volkovi 51', 53'	Report	Vitális (yellow card) 26'; Popović (yellow card) 29'	Stadium: Dalga Arena; Attendance: 2,150; Referee: Ivo Torres (Luxembourg)
Note: Zira played their home match at the Dalga Arena in Baku, instead of their regular stadium, the Zira Olympic Sport Complex Stadium, in Zirə, which did not meet UEFA requirements.

1 August 2024 Second qualifying round 2nd leg	DAC Dunajská Streda (Slovakia)	1–2 (1–6 agg.)	(Azerbaijan) Zira	Dunajská Streda, Slovakia
22:30 AZT (UTC+4)	Méndez 40'; Yapi (red card) 56'; Andzouana (yellow card) 72'; Bajo (yellow card) 77'; Vitális (yellow card) 88'	Report	Utzig 25'; Alıyev 57' (pen.)	Stadium: MOL Aréna; Attendance: 3,754; Referee: Jovan Kachevski (North Macedonia)

8 August 2024 Third qualifying round 1st leg	Osijek (Croatia)	1–1	(Azerbaijan) Zira	Osijek, Croatia
22:00 AZT (UTC+4)	Pušić (yellow card) 37'; Matković 38'; Ademi (yellow card) 74'; Čavlina (yellow card) 85'; Mikolčić (yellow card) 90+5'	Report	Hajili (yellow card) 2'; Nuriyev (yellow card) 34'; Ibrahimli (yellow card) 56'; Utzig 90+4' (pen.)	Stadium: Opus Arena; Attendance: 6,432; Referee: Aristotelis Diamantopoulos (Greece)

15 August 2024 Third qualifying round 2nd leg	Zira (Azerbaijan)	2–2 (a.e.t.) (3–3 agg.) (2–1 p)	(Croatia) Osijek	Baku, Azerbaijan
20:30 AZT (UTC+4)	Júnior (yellow card) 29'; Alıyev 54' (pen.); Volkovi (yellow card) 80' (goal) 90'	Report	Soldo (yellow card) 22'; Jugović 37' (yellow card) 38'; Omerović (yellow card) 78'; Matković 81'; Pušić (yellow card) 90'; Malenica (yellow card) 90+4'; Ademi (yellow card) 109'; Jurišić (yellow card) 111'	Stadium: Dalga Arena; Attendance: 4,000; Referee: Julian Weinberger (Austria)
	Penalties
	Alıyev (penalty missed); Renato (penalty scored); Nuriyev (penalty missed); Isayev (penalty missed); Utzig (penalty scored)		(penalty missed) Pušić; (penalty scored) Nejašmić; (penalty missed) Ademi; (penalty missed) Pedro Lima; (penalty missed) Mikolčić
Note: Zira played their home match at the Dalga Arena in Baku, instead of their regular stadium, the Zira Olympic Sport Complex Stadium, in Zirə, which did not meet UEFA requirements.

22 August 2024 Play-off round 1st leg	Omonia (Cyprus)	6–0	(Azerbaijan) Zira	Nicosia, Cyprus
21:00 AZT (UTC+4)	Khammas 13'; Semedo 34' (pen.), 70'; Stępiński 45+1', 54'; Ewandro 60'	Report	Kuliyev (yellow card) 27'; Silva (yellow card) 31'; Renato (yellow card) 33'; Zebli (yellow card) 69'	Stadium: GSP Stadium; Attendance: 16,551; Referee: Juri Frischer (Estonia)

29 August 2024 Play-off round 2nd leg	Zira (Azerbaijan)	1–0 (1–6 agg.)	(Cyprus) Omonia	Baku, Azerbaijan
20:00 AZT (UTC+4)	Alıyev (yellow card) 65'; Utzig 79'	Report	Ewandro (yellow card) 38'	Stadium: Dalga Arena; Attendance: 1,700; Referee: Vitālijs Spasjoņņikovs (Latvia)
Note: Zira played their home match at the Dalga Arena in Baku, instead of their regular stadium, the Zira Olympic Sport Complex Stadium, in Zirə, which did not meet UEFA requirements.

== Squad statistics ==
As of match played 25 May 2025

=== Appearances and goals ===
No.	Pos	Nat	Player	Total		Premier League		Azerbaijan Cup		UEFA Europa League		UEFA Conference League	
No.	Pos	Nat	Player	Apps	Goals	Apps	Goals	Apps	Goals	Apps	Goals	Apps	Goals
3	DF	(Rwanda) RWA	Ange Mutsinzi	42	0	17+14	0	2+1	0	1+1	0	6	0
4	DF	(Brazil) BRA	Ruan Renato	44	4	32+1	4	3	0	2	0	6	0
5	DF	(Ivory Coast) CIV	Stephane Acka	20	0	13+3	0	1	0	1+1	0	0+1	0
6	MF	(Ukraine) UKR	Eldar Kuliyev	35	0	13+12	0	1+1	0	1+1	0	3+3	0
7	DF	(Azerbaijan) AZE	Magsad Isayev	35	0	20+7	0	2	0	0	0	2+4	0
8	MF	(Azerbaijan) AZE	Ismayil Ibrahimli	40	1	22+10	1	2	0	1+1	0	4	0
10	MF	(Georgia (country)) GEO	Giorgi Papunashvili	33	7	21+8	7	1+2	0	0	0	0+1	0
11	FW	(Azerbaijan) AZE	Rustam Akhmedzade	34	2	11+13	2	1+1	0	1+1	0	3+3	0
13	GK	(Azerbaijan) AZE	Aydın Bayramov	33	0	31	0	2	0	0	0	0	0
14	DF	(Azerbaijan) AZE	Elchin Alijanov	21	1	13+5	1	1+1	0	0	0	0+1	0
15	MF	(Ivory Coast) CIV	Pierre Zebli	31	0	9+12	0	3	0	2	0	4+1	0
16	DF	(Azerbaijan) AZE	Fuad Bayramov	19	0	7+6	0	1	0	0+1	0	0+4	0
17	MF	(France) FRA	Iron Gomis	29	1	22+4	0	1+2	1	0	0	0	0
18	MF	(Brazil) BRA	Martins Júnior	30	4	12+9	3	2+1	0	0+1	0	3+2	1
19	MF	(Guinea) GUI	Salifou Soumah	42	12	30+4	12	2+1	0	1+1	0	1+2	0
21	MF	(Azerbaijan) AZE	Hajiagha Hajili	22	0	6+8	0	1	0	1+1	0	3+2	0
23	FW	(Brazil) BRA	Raphael Utzig	40	14	25+5	9	2	0	2	1	5+1	4
24	MF	(Nigeria) NGA	Yusuf Lawal	10	1	3+6	0	1	1	0	0	0	0
29	MF	(Azerbaijan) AZE	Ceyhun Nuriyev	41	4	15+16	3	1+1	1	1+1	0	4+2	0
30	MF	(Mozambique) MOZ	Guima	4	0	4	0	0	0	0	0	0	0
32	MF	(Azerbaijan) AZE	Qismət Alıyev	38	3	25+3	1	1+1	0	2	0	6	2
41	GK	(Azerbaijan) AZE	Anar Nazirov	2	0	2	0	0	0	0	0	0	0
48	MF	(Azerbaijan) AZE	Ramiz Muradov	1	0	0+1	0	0	0	0	0	0	0
70	FW	(Niger) NIG	Issa Djibrilla	32	4	17+8	4	0+1	0	2	0	4	0
90	FW	(Georgia (country)) GEO	Davit Volkovi	43	15	19+13	11	1+2	0	2	1	6	3
97	GK	(Portugal) POR	Tiago Silva	12	0	3	0	1	0	2	0	6	0
Players away on loan:
Players who left Zira during the season:
22	MF	(Azerbaijan) AZE	Ildar Alekperov	3	0	2+1	0	0	0	0	0	0	0
28	MF	(Nigeria) NGA	Abbas Ibrahim	8	0	2+2	0	0	0	0+1	0	0+3	0

=== Goal scorers ===
Place	Position	Nation	Number	Name	Premier League	Azerbaijan Cup	UEFA Europa League	UEFA Conference League	Total
1	FW	(Georgia (country))	90	Davit Volkovi	11	0	1	3	15
2	FW	(Brazil)	23	Raphael Utzig	9	0	1	4	14
3	MF	(Guinea)	19	Salifou Soumah	12	1	0	0	13
4	FW	(Georgia (country))	10	Giorgi Papunashvili	7	0	0	0	7
5	FW	(Niger)	70	Issa Djibrilla	4	0	0	0	4
5	DF	(Brazil)	4	Ruan Renato	4	0	0	0	4
5	MF	(Azerbaijan)	29	Ceyhun Nuriyev	3	1	0	0	4
5	MF	(Brazil)	18	Martins Júnior	3	0	0	1	4
9	MF	(Azerbaijan)	32	Qismət Alıyev	1	0	0	2	3
10	FW	(Azerbaijan)	11	Rustam Akhmedzade	2	0	0	0	2
11	DF	(Azerbaijan)	14	Elchin Alijanov	1	0	0	0	1
11	MF	(Azerbaijan)	8	Ismayil Ibrahimli	1	0	0	0	1
11	MF	(France)	17	Iron Gomis	0	1	0	0	1
11	MF	(Nigeria)	24	Yusuf Lawal	0	1	0	0	1
11				Own goal	1	0	0	0	1
				TOTALS	58	3	2	10	73

=== Clean sheets ===
Place	Position	Nation	Number	Name	Premier League	Azerbaijan Cup	UEFA Europa League	UEFA Conference League	Total
1	GK	(Azerbaijan)	13	Aydın Bayramov	17	0	0	0	17
2	GK	(Portugal)	97	Tiago Silva	0	0	1	2	3
3	GK	(Azerbaijan)	1	Anar Nazirov	1	0	0	0	1
				TOTALS	18	0	1	2	21

=== Disciplinary record ===
Number	Nation	Position	Name	Premier League		Azerbaijan Cup		UEFA Europa League		UEFA Conference League		Total	
Number	Nation	Position	Name	Booked	Sent off (straight red)	Booked	Sent off (straight red)	Booked	Sent off (straight red)	Booked	Sent off (straight red)	Booked	Sent off (straight red)
3	(Rwanda)	DF	Ange Mutsinzi	1	0	0	0	0	0	0	0	1	0
4	(Brazil)	DF	Ruan Renato	7	0	1	0	0	0	1	0	9	0
5	(Ivory Coast)	DF	Stephane Acka	3	0	0	0	1	0	0	0	4	0
6	(Ukraine)	MF	Eldar Kuliyev	4	0	0	0	0	0	1	0	5	0
7	(Azerbaijan)	DF	Magsad Isayev	4	0	1	0	0	0	0	0	5	0
8	(Azerbaijan)	MF	Ismayil Ibrahimli	3	0	0	0	0	0	1	0	4	0
10	(Georgia (country))	MF	Giorgi Papunashvili	0	0	1	0	0	0	0	0	1	0
11	(Azerbaijan)	FW	Rustam Akhmedzade	2	0	0	0	1	0	0	0	3	0
13	(Azerbaijan)	GK	Aydın Bayramov	2	0	0	0	0	0	0	0	2	0
14	(Azerbaijan)	DF	Elchin Alijanov	1	0	1	0	0	0	0	0	2	0
15	(Ivory Coast)	MF	Pierre Zebli	4	0	0	0	1	0	1	0	6	0
17	(France)	MF	Iron Gomis	3	0	0	0	0	0	0	0	3	0
18	(Brazil)	MF	Martins Júnior	2	0	1	0	0	0	1	0	4	0
19	(Guinea)	MF	Salifou Soumah	1	0	1	0	0	1	0	0	2	1
21	(Azerbaijan)	MF	Hajiagha Hajili	2	0	1	0	0	0	1	0	4	0
23	(Brazil)	FW	Raphael Utzig	6	0	0	0	0	0	0	0	6	0
29	(Azerbaijan)	MF	Ceyhun Nuriyev	3	0	0	0	0	0	1	0	4	0
30	(Mozambique)	MF	Guima	1	0	0	0	0	0	0	0	1	0
32	(Azerbaijan)	MF	Qismət Alıyev	3	1	1	0	0	0	1	0	5	1
70	(Niger)	FW	Issa Djibrilla	1	0	0	0	0	0	0	0	1	0
90	(Georgia (country))	FW	Davit Volkovi	0	0	0	0	0	0	1	0	1	0
97	(Portugal)	GK	Tiago Silva	0	0	0	0	0	0	1	0	1	0
Players away on loan:
Players who left Zira during the season:
28	(Nigeria)	MF	Abbas Ibrahim	1	0	0	0	0	0	0	0	1	0
			TOTALS	54	1	8	0	3	0	10	0	75	2
