= 2023–24 Zira FK season =

Zira
2023-24 season
- President: Vugar Astanov
- Manager: Rashad Sadygov
- Stadium: Zira Olympic Sport Complex Stadium
- Premier League: 2nd
- Azerbaijan Cup: Runners Up
- Top goalscorer: League: Qismət Alıyev (6); All: Salifou Soumah (6); Qismət Alıyev (6)

The Zira FK 2023–24 season was Zira's ninth Azerbaijan Premier League season, and tenth season in their history.

== Season events ==
On 22 June, Zira announced the loan signing of Ismayil Ibrahimli from Qarabağ, and the permanent signing of Magsad Isayev who'd last played for Gabala.

On 23 June, Hajiagha Hajili joined Zira permanently on a two-year contract from Qarabağ, after spending the previous three season with the club, whilst Rustam Akhmedzade extended his loan from Qarabağ for an additional season.

On 24 June, Zira announced the signing of Ruan Renato from Gabala, to a two-year contract.

On 25 June, Fuad Bayramov joined Zira on loan from Shamakhi for the season.

On 20 July, Zira announced the signing of Tiago Silva from Trofense, to a two-year with an option of a third.

On 1 August, Zira announced the signing of Stephane Acka from Sektzia Ness Ziona, to a one-year contract with the option of a second, and the signing of Pierre Zebli from Lokomotiv Plovdiv to a two-year contract with the option of a third year. The following day, 2 August, Salifou Soumah joined Zira from Le Havre on a two-year contract with the option of a third year.

On 26 December, Ceyhun Nuriyev left Sabah to sign for Zira on a 2.5 year contract.

On 5 January, Andrija Lukovic left the club by mutual consent. The following day, 6 January, Zira announced the signing of Raphael Utzig to an 18-month contract.

On 1 March, Zira announced the signing of free agent César Meza Colli on a contract until the end of the season.

On 24 March, Zira announced the signing of free agent Araz Abdullayev on a contract until the end of the season.

== Squad ==
As of match played 2 June 2024

No.	Name	Nationality	Position	Date of birth (age)	Signed from	Signed in	Contract ends	Apps.	Goals
Goalkeepers
41	Anar Nazirov	(Azerbaijan)	GK	8 September 1985 (aged 38)	Gabala	2021	2024	24	0
97	Tiago Silva	(Portugal)	GK	28 March 2000 (aged 24)	Trofense	2023	2025 (+1)	41	0
Defenders
4	Ruan Renato	(Brazil)	DF	14 January 1994 (aged 30)	Gabala	2023	2025	40	2
5	Stephane Acka	(Ivory Coast)	DF	11 October 1990 (aged 33)	Sektzia Ness Ziona	2023	2024 (+1)	30	0
16	Fuad Bayramov	(Azerbaijan)	DF	20 May 1998 (aged 26)	on loan from Shamakhi	2023		31	2
44	Dimitrios Chantakias	(Greece)	DF	4 January 1995 (aged 29)	Cherno More	2020		127	7
77	Magsad Isayev	(Azerbaijan)	DF	7 June 1994 (aged 29)	Gabala	2023	2025	29	1
Midfielders
6	Eldar Kuliyev	(Ukraine)	MF	24 March 2002 (aged 22)	Mynai	2023	2026	51	2
8	Ilkin Muradov	(Azerbaijan)	MF	5 March 1996 (aged 28)	Academy	2019		158	5
10	Ragim Sadykhov	(Azerbaijan)	MF	18 July 1996 (aged 27)	Sumgayit	2022		81	12
15	Pierre Zebli	(Ivory Coast)	MF	12 July 1997 (aged 26)	Lokomotiv Plovdiv	2023	2025 (+1)	38	0
17	Araz Abdullayev	(Azerbaijan)	MF	18 April 1992 (aged 32)	Unattached	2024	2024	4	0
19	Salifou Soumah	(Guinea)	MF	3 October 2003 (aged 20)	Le Havre	2023	2025	41	6
20	Ismayil Ibrahimli	(Azerbaijan)	MF	13 February 1998 (aged 26)	on loan from Qarabağ	2023		35	1
21	Hajiagha Hajili	(Azerbaijan)	MF	30 January 1998 (aged 26)	Qarabağ	2023	2025	103	0
24	César Meza Colli	(Paraguay)	MF	5 October 1991 (aged 32)	Unattached	2024	2024	32	6
28	Abbas Ibrahim	(Nigeria)	MF	2 January 1998 (aged 26)	Paços de Ferreira	2023	2025 (+1)	35	1
29	Ceyhun Nuriyev	(Azerbaijan)	MF	30 March 2001 (aged 23)	Sabah	2023	2026	22	2
32	Qismət Alıyev	(Azerbaijan)	MF	24 October 1996 (aged 27)	Gabala	2020	2022	136	10
38	Ramiz Muradov	(Azerbaijan)	MF	6 July 2005 (aged 18)	Trainee	2022		1	0
66	Parviz Azadov	(Azerbaijan)	MF	19 October 2000 (aged 23)	Shamakhi	2023		2	0
	Omar Gurbanov	(Azerbaijan)	MF	6 April 2005 (aged 19)	Neftçi	2023		0	0
Forwards
7	Filipe Pachtmann	(Brazil)	FW	11 April 2000 (aged 24)	Lviv	2022		23	3
9	Vladyslav Kulach	(Ukraine)	FW	7 May 1993 (aged 31)	Dynamo Kyiv	2023	2024	38	6
11	Rustam Akhmedzade	(Azerbaijan)	FW	25 December 2000 (aged 23)	on loan from Qarabağ	2022	2024	62	6
23	Raphael Utzig	(Brazil)	FW	8 August 1996 (aged 27)	Chungnam Asan	2024	2025	21	5
70	Issa Djibrilla	(Niger)	FW	1 January 1996 (aged 28)	Ankara Keçiörengücü	2023		30	1
Out on loan
Left during the season
17	Toni Gomes	(Guinea-Bissau)	FW	16 November 1998 (aged 25)	Tuzlaspor	2022		26	3
18	Slavik Alkhasov	(Azerbaijan)	DF	6 February 1993 (aged 31)	Sabah	2022		25	0
23	Andrija Luković	(Serbia)	MF	24 October 1994 (aged 29)	Belenenses SAD	2022		38	0
56	Samir Aghayev	(Azerbaijan)	MF	25 May 2002 (aged 22)	Trainee	2021		2	0

== Transfers ==
=== In ===
Date	Position	Nationality	Name	From	Fee	Ref.
22 June 2023	DF	(Azerbaijan)	Magsad Isayev	Unattached	Free	
23 June 2023	DF	(Azerbaijan)	Hajiagha Hajili	Qarabağ	Undisclosed	
24 June 2023	DF	(Brazil)	Ruan Renato	Gabala	Undisclosed	
20 July 2023	GK	(Portugal)	Tiago Silva	Trofense	Undisclosed	
1 August 2023	DF	(Ivory Coast)	Stephane Acka	Sektzia Ness Ziona	Undisclosed	
1 August 2023	MF	(Ivory Coast)	Pierre Zebli	Lokomotiv Plovdiv	Undisclosed	
2 August 2023	MF	(Guinea)	Salifou Soumah	Le Havre	Undisclosed	
6 September 2023	MF	(Azerbaijan)	Omar Gurbanov	Neftçi	Undisclosed	
26 December 2023	MF	(Azerbaijan)	Ceyhun Nuriyev	Sabah	Undisclosed	
6 January 2024	FW	(Brazil)	Raphael Utzig	Chungnam Asan	Undisclosed	
1 March 2024	MF	(Paraguay)	César Meza Colli	Unattached	Free	
24 March 2024	MF	(Azerbaijan)	Araz Abdullayev	Unattached	Free	

=== Loans in ===
Date from	Position	Nationality	Name	From	Date to	Ref.
22 June 2023	MF	(Azerbaijan)	Ismayil Ibrahimli	Qarabağ	End of the season	
23 June 2023	FW	(Azerbaijan)	Rustam Akhmedzade	Qarabağ	End of the season	
25 June 2023	DF	(Azerbaijan)	Fuad Bayramov	Shamakhi	End of the season	

=== Out ===
Date	Position	Nationality	Name	To	Fee	Ref.
12 June 2023	DF	(Azerbaijan)	Cəlal Hüseynov	Arda Kardzhali	Undisclosed	
1 August 2023	MF	(Azerbaijan)	Samir Aghayev	Shamakhi	Undisclosed	
23 August 2023	FW	(Guinea-Bissau)	Toni Gomes	Hapoel Hadera	Undisclosed	

=== Released ===
Date	Position	Nationality	Name	Joined	Date	Ref
2 June 2023	GK	(Azerbaijan)	Mekhti Dzhenetov	Sumgayit	5 June 2023	
2 June 2023	DF	(Guinea-Bissau)	Moïse Adiléhou	Maccabi Petah Tikva	20 June 2023	
2 June 2023	MF	(Belgium)	Loris Brogno	Sangiuliano City		
2 June 2023	MF	(France)	Hamidou Keyta	Qarabağ	3 June 2023	
2 June 2023	MF	(Azerbaijan)	Mirsahib Abbasov	Iravan		
2 June 2023	MF	(Azerbaijan)	Coşqun Diniyev	Sabail	21 June 2023	
14 June 2023	DF	(Azerbaijan)	Sertan Taşqın	Turan Tovuz		
14 June 2023	MF	(Azerbaijan)	Ruslan Abishov	Retired		
14 June 2023	MF	(Haiti)	Wilde-Donald Guerrier	Panevėžys		
14 June 2023	FW	(Netherlands)	Mo Hamdaoui	ADO Den Haag	30 August 2023	
30 June 2023	GK	(Azerbaijan)	Nail Alishov	Difai Agsu	1 July 2024	
30 June 2023	MF	(Azerbaijan)	Ramiz Muradov			
10 August 2023	DF	(Azerbaijan)	Slavik Alkhasov	Turan Tovuz	11 August 2023	
5 January 2024	MF	(Serbia)	Andrija Lukovic	Radnički Niš		

== Friendlies ==
10 January 2024	Zira	2–1	Araz-Naxçıvan	Baku
15:00 AZT (UTC+4)	I.Muradov 55'; Soumah 71'	Report	O.Aliyev 68'

15 January 2024	Qarabağ	4–0	Zira	Baku
15:00 AZT (UTC+4)	L.Andrade; Richard; Xhixha; Akhundzade	Report		Stadium: Azersun Arena

== Competitions ==
=== Overview ===
Competition	First match	Last match	Starting round	Final position	Record							
Competition	First match	Last match	Starting round	Final position	Pld	W	D	L	GF	GA	GD	Win %
Premier League	5 August 2023	25 May 2024	Matchday 1	2nd	36	16	10	10	33	22	+11	44.44
Azerbaijan Cup	December 2023	2 June 2024	Last 16	Runners up	6	5	0	1	12	5	+7	83.33
Total					42	21	10	11	45	27	+18	50.00

Last updated: 2 June 2024
Source: Competitions

=== Premier League ===
==== Results summary ====
Overall								Home						Away					
Pld	W	D	L	GF	GA	GD	Pts	W	D	L	GF	GA	GD	W	D	L	GF	GA	GD
36	16	10	10	33	22	+11	58	9	5	4	20	11	+9	7	5	6	13	11	+2

Last updated: 25 May 2024.
Source: See Results

==== Results by round ====
Round	1	2	3	4	5	6	7	8	9	10	11	12	13	14	15	16	17	18	19	20	21	22	23	24	25	26	27	28	29	30	31	32	33	34	35	36
Ground	A	H	A	H	A	H	H	A	H	A	H	A	H	A	A	H	A	H	A	H	A	H	A	A	H	A	H	A	H	A	H	H	A	H	A	H
Result	W	W	W	W	L	W	D	L	W	D	D	W	W	D	L	D	L	L	D	L	D	D	L	W	D	L	W	W	W	D	W	L	W	L	W	W
Position	5	1	1	1	1	1	1	2	1	1	1	1	1	2	2	2	2	2	2	4	4	4	4	4	5	6	4	3	2	3	2	4	2	4	3	2

Updated to match(es) played on 25 May 2024. Source: See Results
A = Away; H = Home; W = Win; D = Draw; L = Loss

==== Results ====
5 August 2023 1	Qarabağ	0–1	Zira	Baku
21:00 AZT (UTC+4)	Guseynov (yellow card) 47'; Mammadov (yellow card) 70'	Report	Chantakias 48' (yellow card) 87'; Zebli (yellow card) 81'	Stadium: Azersun Arena; Referee: Aliyar Ağayev

12 August 2023 2	Zira	1–0	Kapaz	Zirə
21:00 AZT (UTC+4)	Alıyev 64'; Akhmedzade (yellow card) 71'	Report	Jafarov (yellow card) 20'; Khvalko (yellow card) 52'	Stadium: Zira Olympic Sport Complex Stadium; Referee: Kamal Umudlu

19 August 2023 3	Sabail	1–2	Zira	Bayil
20:00 AZT (UTC+4)	Lugasi 31'; Ramazanov (yellow card) 64'; Amirli (yellow card) 78'	Report	Soumah 16'; Alıyev (yellow card) 70'; Filipe 82'; Azadov (yellow card) 90+3'	Stadium: Bayil Arena; Referee: Ingilab Mammadov

26 August 2023 4	Zira	1–0	Sabah	Zirə
19:30 AZT (UTC+4)	Kulach 2' (yellow card) 68'; Chantakias (yellow card) 63'; Alıyev (yellow card) 74'	Report	Seydiyev (red card) 70'	Stadium: Zira Olympic Sport Complex Stadium; Referee: Elcin Masiyev

2 September 2023 5	Gabala	1–0	Zira	Qabala
18:00 AZT (UTC+4)	Hüseynli 20'; Qirtimov (yellow card) 45'; Aouacheria (yellow card) 45'; Allach (yellow card) 45+2'; Abbasov (yellow card) 75'; Mammadov (yellow card) 90+6'; Isaiah (yellow card) 90+9'	Report	Chantakias (yellow card) 45'; Kuliyev (yellow card) 45'; Alıyev (yellow card) 51'; Djibrilla (yellow card) 90'	Stadium: City Stadium; Referee: Javid Jalilov

15 September 2023 6	Zira	1–0	Sumgayit	Zirə
17:00 AZT (UTC+4)	Zebli (red card) 11'; Isayev 45+1'; Djibrilla (yellow card) 45+1'; Kuliyev (yellow card) 52'; Ruan (yellow card) 53'	Report	Mustafayev (yellow card) 29'; Abdullazade (yellow card) 31'; Muradov (yellow card) 90+4'	Stadium: Zira Olympic Sport Complex Stadium; Referee: Kamranbay Rəhimov

23 September 2023 7	Zira	1–1	Neftçi	Zirə
20:30 AZT (UTC+4)	Kuliyev (yellow card) 3'; Ibrahim (yellow card) 28'; Alıyev 44' (pen.); Muradov (yellow card) 74'	Report	Matias 22' (yellow card) 43'; Mahmudov (yellow card) 45'	Stadium: Zira Olympic Sport Complex Stadium; Referee: Ravan Hamzazada

1 October 2023 8	Araz-Naxçıvan	1–0	Zira	Baku
AZT (UTC+4)	Rodrigues 78'; Igor (yellow card) 83' (yellow-red card) 90+4'	Report	Ruan (yellow card) 25'; Isayev (yellow card) 43'; Kulach (yellow card) 83'	Stadium: Dalga Arena; Referee: Ali Aliyev

6 October 2023 9	Zira	2–1	Turan Tovuz	Zirə
18:00 AZT (UTC+4)	Soumah 34'; Alıyev (yellow card) 59' (goal) 77'	Report	Marandici 74'	Stadium: Zira Olympic Sport Complex Stadium; Referee: Ingilab Mammadov

21 October 2023 10	Kapaz	0–0	Zira	Ganja
15:00 AZT (UTC+4)	Ahmadov (yellow card) 34'	Report	Isayev (yellow card) 11'; Ruan (yellow card) 75'; Akhmedzade (yellow card) 84'; Silva (yellow card) 90+5'; Djibrilla (yellow card) 90+5'	Stadium: City Stadium; Referee: Rauf Allahverdiyev

28 October 2023 11	Zira	2–2	Sabail	Zirə
16:00 AZT (UTC+4)	Djibrilla 19'; Akhmedzade 79'; Zebli (yellow card) 87'; Alıyev (yellow card) 87'; Isayev (yellow card) 89'	Report	Nuno 31', 34'; Mehremić (yellow card) 75'	Stadium: Zira Olympic Sport Complex Stadium; Referee: Rauf Jabarov

5 November 2023 12	Sabah	0–1	Zira	Masazır
18:30 AZT (UTC+4)	Apeh (yellow card) 42' (yellow-red card) 42'	Report	Zebli (yellow card) 46'; Akhmedzade 90+1'	Stadium: Bank Respublika Arena; Referee: Tural Qurbanov

12 November 2023 13	Zira	1–0	Gabala	Zirə
16:30 AZT (UTC+4)	Alıyev 65' (pen.)	Report	Akakpo (yellow card) 57'; Mammadov (yellow card) 87'; Ochihava (yellow card) 90'	Stadium: Zira Olympic Sport Complex Stadium; Referee: Elcin Masiyev

26 November 2023 14	Sumgayit	0–0	Zira	Sumgait
18:00 AZT (UTC+4)	Muradov (yellow card) 64'	Report		Stadium: Kapital Bank Arena; Referee: Aliyar Ağayev

3 December 2023 15	Neftçi	1–0	Zira	Baku
17:00 AZT (UTC+4)	Shinyashiki (yellow card) 45'; Hajiyev 60'	Report	Ruan (yellow card) 40'	Stadium: Neftçi Arena; Referee: Ingilab Mammadov

9 December 2023 16	Zira	0–0	Araz-Naxçıvan	Zirə
17:00 AZT (UTC+4)	Sadykhov (yellow card) 43'; Alıyev (yellow card) 76'	Report	Kuzmanović (yellow card) 61'; Aliyev (yellow card) 78'	Stadium: Zira Olympic Sport Complex Stadium; Referee: Raad Ahmadov

16 December 2023 17	Turan Tovuz	1–0	Zira	Tovuz
18:00 AZT (UTC+4)	Hajiyev (yellow card) 8'; Nabiyev 76'; Bayramov (yellow card) 89'	Report	Zebli (yellow card) 70'; Kulach (yellow card) 77'; Alıyev (yellow card) 89'	Stadium: City Stadium; Referee: Elcin Masiyev

24 December 2023 18	Zira	0–1	Qarabağ	Zirə
18:30 AZT (UTC+4)	Isayev (yellow card) 13'; Kuliyev (yellow card) 38'	Report	Romão (yellow card) 26'; Juninho 30'; L.Andrade (yellow card) 35'; P.Andrade (yellow card) 36'; Cafarguliyev (yellow card) 55'; Benzia (yellow card) 85'	Stadium: Zira Olympic Sport Complex Stadium; Referee: Javid Jalilov

22 January 2024 19	Sabail	0–0	Zira	Baku
15:00 AZT (UTC+4)	Paná (yellow card) 20'; Naghiyev (yellow card) 74'; Mehremić (yellow card) 90+1'; Lugasi (yellow card) 90+4'	Report	Ruan (yellow card) 13'; Zebli (yellow card) 54'; Utzig (yellow card) 55'	Stadium: Bayil Arena; Referee: Farid Haciyev

27 January 2024 20	Zira	0–1	Sabah	Zirə
17:30 AZT (UTC+4)	Ruan (yellow card) 71'; Silva (yellow card) 90+8'	Report	Camalov (yellow card) 17' (yellow-red card) 44'; Thill (yellow card) 29'; Chakla (yellow card) 45+3' (goal) 90+9' (pen.); Christian (yellow card) 90+2'	Stadium: Zira Olympic Sport Complex Stadium; Referee: Rauf Jabarov

4 February 2024 21	Gabala	1–1	Zira	Qabala
17:30 AZT (UTC+4)	Isgandarov 14'; Safarov (yellow card) 89'; Khalaila (yellow card) 90+4'; Akel (yellow card) 90+4'	Report	Muradov 19'; Ruan (yellow card) 77'; Silva (yellow card) 90+4'; Zebli (yellow card) 90+4'	Stadium: City Stadium; Referee: Raad Ahmadov

13 February 2024 22	Zira	0–0	Sumgayit	Zirə
17:15 AZT (UTC+4)	Ruan (yellow card) 9'; Isayev (yellow card) 66'; Ibrahimli (yellow card) 76'	Report	Dosso (yellow card) 35'; Suliman (yellow card) 40'; Murata (yellow card) 75'	Stadium: Zira Olympic Sport Complex Stadium; Referee: Tural Qurbanov

18 February 2024 23	Neftçi	1–0	Zira	Baku
18:00 AZT (UTC+4)	Koffi 11'; Lebon (yellow card) 17'	Report	Acka (yellow card) 74'	Stadium: Neftçi Arena; Referee: Aliyar Ağayev

25 February 2024 24	Araz-Naxçıvan	0–3	Zira	Baku
16:30 AZT (UTC+4)		Report	Alıyev (yellow card) 16'; Wanderson 20' (o.g.); Ruan (yellow card) 56'; Sadykhov 75'; Utzig 77'	Stadium: Dalga Arena; Referee: Rauf Allahverdiyev

2 March 2024 25	Zira	1–1	Turan Tovuz	Zirə
16:00 AZT (UTC+4)	Soumah (yellow card) 27'; Djibrilla (red card) 43'; Nuriyev 62' (pen.)	Report	Pusi 12'; Yusifli (yellow card) 53'; Aliyev (yellow card) 62'; Guseynov (yellow card) 66'	Stadium: Zira Olympic Sport Complex Stadium; Referee: Ravan Hamzazada

10 March 2024 26	Qarabağ	3–1	Zira	Baku
18:00 AZT (UTC+4)	Cafarguliyev (yellow card) 28'; Akhundzade 43'; Richard 76' (pen.); Diakhaby 81'	Report	Nuriyev (yellow card) 72'; Colli 79'	Stadium: Tofiq Bahramov Republican Stadium; Referee: Aliyar Ağayev

16 March 2024 27	Zira	2–1	Kapaz	Zirə
16:00 AZT (UTC+4)	Soumah (yellow card) 18' (goal) 60'; Sadykhov (yellow card) 43'; Nuriyev (yellow card) 67'; Alıyev 76' (pen.)	Report	Taghiyev (yellow card) 90+2'; Júnior 90+4'	Stadium: Zira Olympic Sport Complex Stadium; Referee: Kamal Umudlu

30 March 2024 28	Sabah	0–1	Zira	Masazır
18:00 AZT (UTC+4)	Khaybulayev (yellow card) 83'	Report	Ruan 25'; Alıyev (yellow card) 34'	Stadium: Bank Respublika Arena; Referee: Elcin Masiyev

7 April 2024 29	Zira	4–0	Gabala	Zirə
16:30 AZT (UTC+4)	Sadykhov 4'; Utzig 25'; Nuriyev 28'; Zebli (yellow card) 37'; Bayramov 57'; Acka (yellow card) 60'	Report	Musayev (yellow card) 29'; Ochihava (yellow card) 51'; Safarov (yellow card) 79'	Stadium: Zira Olympic Sport Complex Stadium; Referee: Ravan Hamzazada

12 April 2024 30	Sumgayit	0–0	Zira	Sumgait
19:00 AZT (UTC+4)	Ninga (yellow card) 42'; Abdullazade (yellow card) 64'	Report	Utzig (yellow card) 69'; Abdullayev (yellow card) 81'; Zebli (yellow card) 89'	Stadium: Kapital Bank Arena; Referee: Tural Qurbanov

20 April 2024 31	Zira	3–1	Neftçi	Zirə
19:00 AZT (UTC+4)	Ibrahimli (yellow card) 36'; Sadykhov 43'; Nuriyev (yellow card) 59' (yellow-red card) 67'; Ruan (yellow card) 65'; Bayramov 79'; Kulach 84'; Ibrahim (yellow card) 84'	Report	Mahmudov 19' (pen.); Matias (yellow card) 35'; Bogomolsky (yellow card) 42'; Tamás (yellow card) 65'	Stadium: Zira Olympic Sport Complex Stadium; Referee: Ingilab Mammadov

29 April 2024 32	Zira	0–1	Araz-Naxçıvan	Zirə
19:00 AZT (UTC+4)	Alıyev (yellow card) 38'; Chantakias (yellow card) 45'; Kulach (yellow card) 90+3'	Report	Igor 89'; Kadiri (yellow card) 90+6'	Stadium: Zira Olympic Sport Complex Stadium; Referee: Javif Jalilov

5 May 2024 33	Turan Tovuz	1–2	Zira	Tovuz
16:30 AZT (UTC+4)	Nabiyev 53'; Miller (red card) 90+9'	Report	Sadykhov (yellow card) 2'; Soumah 14'; Meza 70' (yellow card) 90+5'; Silva (yellow card) 90+6'; Nazirov (yellow card) 90+7'; Acka (yellow card) 90+9'	Stadium: City Stadium; Referee: Elcin Məsiyev

11 May 2024 34	Zira	0–1	Qarabağ	Zirə
19:30 AZT (UTC+4)	Kulach (yellow card) 42'; Ruan (yellow card) 90+2'	Report	Cafarguliyev (yellow card) 15'; Juninho 34' (pen.); Janković (yellow card) 38'; P.Andrade (yellow card) 63'; Diakhaby (yellow card) 78'	Stadium: Zira Olympic Sport Complex Stadium; Referee: Aliyar Ağayev

18 May 2024 35	Kapaz	0–1	Zira	Ganja
AZT (UTC+4)	Taghiyev (yellow card) 39'; Masimov (yellow card) 90+3'; Khvalko (yellow card) 90+3'	Report	Soumah 50'; Ibrahim (yellow card) 75'; Alıyev (yellow card) 86'	Stadium: City Stadium; Referee: Ravan Hamzazada

25 May 2024 36	Zira	1–0	Sabail	Zirə
19:00 AZT (UTC+4)	Ruan (yellow card) 45'; Alıyev 57'; Zebli (yellow card) 85'; Silva (yellow card) 86'; Ibrahimli (yellow card) 90+4'	Report	Mehremić (yellow card) 5'; Naghiyev (yellow card) 11'; Paná (yellow card) 26' (yellow-red card) 70'; Nabiyev (yellow card) 32'; Deslandes (yellow card) 90'	Stadium: Zira Olympic Sport Complex Stadium; Referee: Ingilab Mammadov

==== League table ====
Pos	Team	Pld	W	D	L	GF	GA	GD	Pts	Qualification or relegation
1	Qarabağ (C)	36	26	5	5	97	37	+60	83	Qualification for the Champions League second qualifying round (Note: Since already qualified Real Madrid won the Champions League, Qarabağ was promoted to the Champions League second qualifying round as one of the two champions with the highest coefficient in Champions League qualifying.)
2	Zira	36	16	10	10	33	22	+11	58 (Note: Zira are ahead of Sabah on head-to-head points: Zira 1–0 Sabah, Sabah 0–1 Zira, Zira 0–1 Sabah, Sabah 0–1 Zira)	Qualification for the Europa League first qualifying round (Note: The 2023–24 Azerbaijan Cup winners qualified for the Europa League first qualifying round. Since the cup winners (Qarabağ) qualified based on league position, the Europa League spot was passed to the second-placed team, and the second Conference League second round spot was passed to the fourth-placed team.)
3	Sabah	36	17	7	12	50	40	+10	58	Qualification for the Conference League second qualifying round
4	Sumgayit	36	15	12	9	37	38	−1	57	Qualification for the Conference League second qualifying round
5	Neftçi	36	16	8	12	51	40	+11	56	

Source: Soccerway
Rules for classification: 1) Points; 2) Head-to-head points; 3) Head-to-head goal difference; 4) Head-to-head goals scored; 5) Head-to-head away goals scored (only if two teams); 6) Goal difference; 7) Goals scored.
(C) Champions

=== Azerbaijan Cup ===
20 December 2023 Last 16	Zira	2–1	Turan Tovuz	Zirə
17:00 AZT (UTC+4)	Soumah (yellow card) 64'; Chantakias (yellow card) 78'; Pachtmann 82'; Akhmedzade 89' (yellow card) 90'; Kulach (yellow card) 90+9'	Report	John 4'; Najafov (yellow card) 83'; Miller (yellow card) 90'	Stadium: Zira Olympic Sport Complex Stadium; Attendance: 800; Referee: Inqilab Mammadov

30 January 2024 Quarterfinal 1st leg	Sabail	1–2	Zira	Baku
15:00 AZT (UTC+4)	Haziyev (yellow card) 28'; Ramalingom 70'	Report	Najah 48' (o.g.); Ruan 60'	Stadium: Bayil Arena; Attendance: 200; Referee: Inqilab Mammadov

8 February 2024 Quarterfinal 2nd leg	Zira	3–0 (5–1 agg.)	Sabail	Zirə
17:00 AZT (UTC+4)	Ibrahim 4' (yellow card) 26'; Kuliyev (yellow card) 32'; Sadykhov 42'; Utzig 74' (yellow card) 88'	Report	Bardea (yellow card) 90+2'	Stadium: Zira Olympic Sport Complex Stadium; Attendance: 800; Referee: Elçin Masiyev

3 April 2024 Semifinal 1st leg	Zira	2–1	Gabala	Zirə
19:30 AZT (UTC+4)	Soumah 51'; Utzig 68'	Report	Abbasov (yellow card) 33'; Qirtimov (yellow card) 45+1'; Abu Akel 90' (yellow card) 90'	Stadium: Zira Olympic Sport Complex Stadium; Attendance: 600; Referee: İnqilab Məmmədov

24 April 2024 Semifinal 2nd leg	Gabala	0–2 (1–4 agg.)	Zira	Qabala
17:00 AZT (UTC+4)	Mammadov (yellow card) 20'	Report	Kulach (yellow card) 19' (goal) 62'; Zebli (yellow card) 78'; Bayramov (yellow card) 82'; Utzig 85'	Stadium: City Stadium; Attendance: 850; Referee: Tural Gurbanov

2 June 2024 Final	Qarabağ	2–1	Zira	Baku
20:00 AZT (UTC+4)	Juninho 42' (yellow card) 85'; Zoubir 62'; Keyta (yellow card) 90+5'	Report	Ibrahimli 58'; Sadykhov (yellow card) 59'; Ruan (yellow card) 76'	Stadium: Dalga Arena; Attendance: 3,000; Referee: Ravan Hamzazada

== Squad statistics ==
As of match played 2 June 2024

=== Appearances and goals ===
No.	Pos	Nat	Player	Total		Premier League		Azerbaijan Cup	
No.	Pos	Nat	Player	Apps	Goals	Apps	Goals	Apps	Goals
4	DF	(Brazil) BRA	Ruan Renato	40	2	34	1	6	1
5	DF	(Ivory Coast) CIV	Stephane Acka	30	0	18+8	0	4	0
6	MF	(Ukraine) UKR	Eldar Kuliyev	37	0	21+11	0	4+1	0
7	FW	(Brazil) BRA	Filipe Pachtmann	7	2	3+3	1	0+1	1
8	MF	(Azerbaijan) AZE	Ilkin Muradov	20	1	7+12	1	0+1	0
9	FW	(Ukraine) UKR	Vladyslav Kulach	29	3	11+14	2	1+3	1
10	MF	(Azerbaijan) AZE	Ragim Sadykhov	40	4	22+12	3	5+1	1
11	FW	(Azerbaijan) AZE	Rustam Akhmedzade	26	3	14+9	2	2+1	1
15	MF	(Ivory Coast) CIV	Pierre Zebli	38	0	29+3	0	5+1	0
16	DF	(Azerbaijan) AZE	Fuad Bayramov	31	2	15+11	2	4+1	0
17	MF	(Azerbaijan) AZE	Araz Abdullayev	4	0	0+3	0	0+1	0
19	MF	(Guinea) GUI	Salifou Soumah	41	6	26+9	5	4+2	1
20	MF	(Azerbaijan) AZE	Ismayil Ibrahimli	35	1	23+7	0	3+2	1
21	MF	(Azerbaijan) AZE	Hajiagha Hajili	16	0	1+14	0	1	0
23	FW	(Brazil) BRA	Raphael Utzig	21	5	14+2	2	3+2	3
24	MF	(Paraguay) PAR	César Meza Colli	10	2	2+6	2	0+2	0
28	MF	(Nigeria) NGR	Abbas Ibrahim	27	1	16+6	0	4+1	1
29	MF	(Azerbaijan) AZE	Ceyhun Nuriyev	22	2	14+3	2	2+3	0
32	MF	(Azerbaijan) AZE	Qismət Alıyev	40	6	34	6	5+1	0
41	GK	(Azerbaijan) AZE	Anar Nazirov	1	0	1	0	0	0
44	DF	(Greece) GRE	Dimitrios Chantakias	32	1	24+4	1	3+1	0
66	MF	(Azerbaijan) AZE	Parviz Azadov	1	0	0+1	0	0	0
70	FW	(Niger) NIG	Issa Djibrilla	21	1	10+7	1	0+4	0
77	DF	(Azerbaijan) AZE	Magsad Isayev	29	1	22+3	1	4	0
97	GK	(Portugal) POR	Tiago Silva	41	0	35	0	6	0
Players away on loan:
Players who left Zira during the season:
17	FW	(Guinea-Bissau) GBS	Toni Gomes	1	0	0+1	0	0	0
23	MF	(Serbia) SRB	Andrija Luković	8	0	0+7	0	0+1	0

=== Goal scorers ===
Place	Position	Nation	Number	Name	Premier League	Azerbaijan Cup	Total
1	MF	(Azerbaijan)	32	Qismət Alıyev	6	0	6
1	MF	(Guinea)	19	Salifou Soumah	5	1	6
3	FW	(Brazil)	23	Raphael Utzig	2	3	5
4	MF	(Azerbaijan)	10	Ragim Sadykhov	3	1	4
5	FW	(Azerbaijan)	11	Rustam Akhmedzade	2	1	3
5	FW	(Ukraine)	9	Vladyslav Kulach	2	1	3
7	MF	(Azerbaijan)	29	Ceyhun Nuriyev	2	0	2
7	MF	(Azerbaijan)	16	Fuad Bayramov	2	0	2
7	MF	(Paraguay)	24	César Meza Colli	2	0	2
7	FW	(Brazil)	7	Filipe Pachtmann	1	1	2
7	DF	(Brazil)	4	Ruan Renato	1	1	2
7				Own goal	1	1	2
13	DF	(Greece)	44	Dimitrios Chantakias	1	0	1
13	DF	(Azerbaijan)	77	Magsad Isayev	1	0	1
13	FW	(Niger)	70	Issa Djibrilla	1	0	1
13	MF	(Azerbaijan)	8	Ilkin Muradov	1	0	1
13	MF	(Nigeria)	28	Abbas Ibrahim	0	1	1
13	MF	(Azerbaijan)	20	Ismayil Ibrahimli	0	1	1
				TOTALS	33	12	45

=== Clean sheets ===
Place	Position	Nation	Number	Name	Premier League	Azerbaijan Cup	Total
1	GK	(Portugal)	97	Tiago Silva	17	1	18
				TOTALS	17	1	18

=== Disciplinary record ===
Number	Nation	Position	Name	Premier League		Azerbaijan Cup		Total	
Number	Nation	Position	Name	Yellow card	Red card	Yellow card	Red card	Yellow card	Red card
4	(Brazil)	DF	Ruan Renato	12	0	1	0	13	0
5	(Ivory Coast)	DF	Stephane Acka	3	0	0	0	3	0
6	(Ukraine)	MF	Eldar Kuliyev	4	0	1	0	5	0
8	(Azerbaijan)	MF	Ilkin Muradov	1	0	0	0	1	0
9	(Ukraine)	FW	Vladyslav Kulach	5	0	2	0	7	0
10	(Azerbaijan)	MF	Ragim Sadykhov	3	0	1	0	4	0
11	(Azerbaijan)	FW	Rustam Akhmedzade	2	0	1	0	3	0
15	(Ivory Coast)	MF	Pierre Zebli	9	1	1	0	10	1
16	(Azerbaijan)	DF	Fuad Bayramov	0	0	1	0	1	0
17	(Azerbaijan)	MF	Araz Abdullayev	1	0	0	0	1	0
19	(Guinea)	MF	Salifou Soumah	2	0	1	0	3	0
20	(Azerbaijan)	MF	Ismayil Ibrahimli	3	0	0	0	3	0
23	(Brazil)	FW	Raphael Utzig	2	0	1	0	3	0
24	(Paraguay)	MF	César Meza Colli	1	0	0	0	1	0
28	(Nigeria)	MF	Abbas Ibrahim	3	0	1	0	4	0
29	(Azerbaijan)	MF	Ceyhun Nuriyev	4	1	0	0	4	1
32	(Azerbaijan)	MF	Qismət Alıyev	11	0	0	0	11	0
41	(Azerbaijan)	GK	Anar Nazirov	1	0	0	0	1	0
44	(Greece)	DF	Dimitrios Chantakias	4	0	1	0	5	0
66	(Azerbaijan)	MF	Parviz Azadov	1	0	0	0	1	0
70	(Niger)	FW	Issa Djibrilla	3	1	0	0	3	1
77	(Azerbaijan)	DF	Magsad Isayev	5	0	0	0	5	0
97	(Portugal)	GK	Tiago Silva	5	0	0	0	5	0
Players away on loan:
Players who left Zira during the season:
			TOTALS	85	3	12	0	97	3
