= Filipe Pachtmann =

Brazilian footballer (born 2000)

Personal information
- Date of birth: 11 April 2000 (age 26)
- Place of birth: Imbituba, Brazil
- Height: 1.90 m (6 ft 3 in)
- Position: Forward

Youth career
- 2013–2019: Imbituba
- 2017: → Fortaleza (loan)

Senior career*
Years	Team	Apps	(Gls)
2019–2022	Lviv	13	(0)
2021–2022	→ Zira (loan)	1	(0)
2022–2025	Zira	17	(2)
- * Club domestic league appearances and goals as of 19 February 2025

Filipe Pachtmann (born 11 April 2000) is a Brazilian footballer who plays as a forward, most recently for Zira.

== Career ==
On 30 January 2021, Azerbaijan Premier League club Zira announced the signing of Pachtmann on loan from Lviv until the end of the season, with an option to make the move permanent on a three-year contract at the end of the season. On 12 July 2021, Zira announced that they had extended their loan deal with Pachtmann for an additional season, with the option to sign Pachtmann to a three-year permanent contract.

On 1 July 2022, Zira announced the permanent signing of Pachtmann from Lviv.

On 19 February 2025, Zira announced that Pachtmann had left the club after his contract was ended by mutual agreement.

== Career statistics ==
=== Club ===
As of match played 20 December 2023.

Club	Season	League			Cup		Continental		Other		Total	
Club	Season	Division	Apps	Goals	Apps	Goals	Apps	Goals	Apps	Goals	Apps	Goals
Lviv	2019–20	Ukrainian Premier League	6	0	1	0	—		—		7	0
Lviv	2020–21	Ukrainian Premier League	7	0	0	0	—		—		7	0
Lviv	Total		13	0	1	0	0	0	0	0	14	0
Zira (loan)	2020–21	Azerbaijan Premier League	1	0	2	0	—		—		3	0
Zira (loan)	2021–22	Azerbaijan Premier League	0	0	0	0	—		—		0	0
Zira	2022–23	Azerbaijan Premier League	11	1	1	0	1	0	—		13	1
Zira	2023–24	Azerbaijan Premier League	6	1	1	1	—		—		7	2
Zira	2024–25	Azerbaijan Premier League	0	0	0	0	0	0	—		0	0
Zira	Total		17	2	4	1	1	0	0	0	20	2
Career total			31	2	5	1	1	0	0	0	37	3
