= Raphael Utzig =

Brazilian footballer

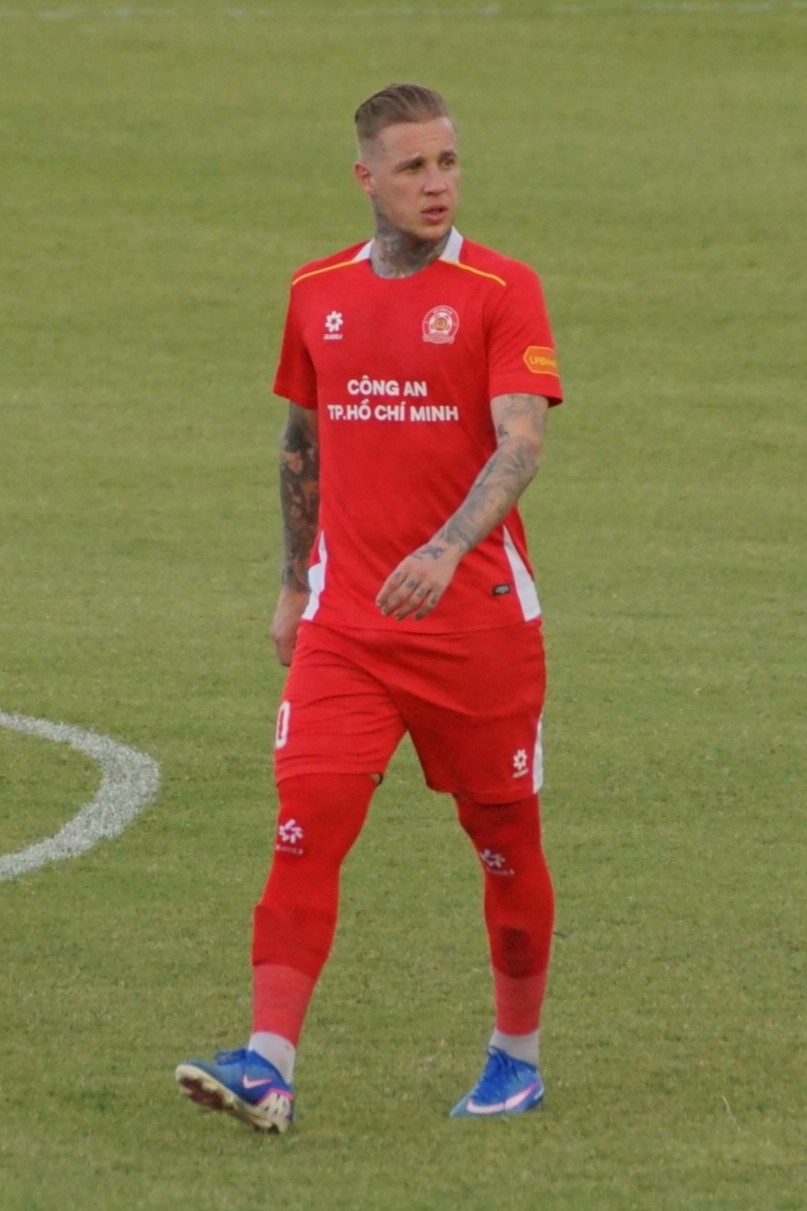
- Utzig in 2026

Personal information
- Full name: Raphael Schorr Utzig
- Date of birth: 8 August 1996 (age 30)
- Place of birth: Rio de Janeiro, Brazil
- Height: 1.80 m (5 ft 11 in)
- Position: Forward

Team information
- Current team: Qabala
- Number: 23

Senior career*
Years	Team	Apps	(Gls)
2015	Foz Iguaçu	1	(0)
2016	Cascavel	4	(0)
2016–2017	Ypiranga	9	(0)
2018	Foz Iguaçu	10	(2)
2018–2020	Paraná	22	(1)
2019	→ Cianorte (loan)	8	(0)
2020–2023	Qabala	81	(15)
2023	Chungnam Asan	16	(1)
2024–2026	Zira	46	(11)
2025–2026	→ Cong An Ho Chi Minh City (loan)	22	(1)
2026–	Qabala	5	(0)
- * Club domestic league appearances and goals as of 13 November 2026

Raphael Utzig (born 8 August 1996) is a Brazilian professional footballer who plays for Qabala, as a forward in the Azerbaijan Premier League.

== Club career ==
On 11 September 2020, Utzig signed a two-year contract with Gabala FK. On 22 June 2022, Gabala announced that they had extended Utzig's contract for an additional year.

On 7 July 2023, Utzig signed for Chungnam Asan.

On 6 January 2024, Utzig returned to the Azerbaijan Premier League, signing an 18-month contract with Zira.

On 20 August 2025, Utzig joined V.League 1 club Cong An Ho Chi Minh City on a one-year loan deal.

On 25 September 2026, Qabala announced the return to the club of Utzig, on a contract until the end of the season.

== Career statistics ==
=== Club ===
As of match played 7 November 2026

Appearances and goals by club, season and competition
Club	Season	League			National Cup		Continental		Other		Total	
Club	Season	Division	Apps	Goals	Apps	Goals	Apps	Goals	Apps	Goals	Apps	Goals
Gabala	2020–21	Azerbaijan Premier League	25	5	3	0	—				28	5
Gabala	2021–22	Azerbaijan Premier League	26	6	4	0	—				30	6
Gabala	2022–23	Azerbaijan Premier League	30	4	4	2	2	1	—		36	7
Gabala	Total		81	15	11	2	2	1	-	-	94	18
Chungnam Asan	2023	K League 2	16	1	0	0	—				16	1
Zira	2023–24	Azerbaijan Premier League	16	2	5	3	—				21	5
Zira	2024–25	Azerbaijan Premier League	30	9	2	0	8	5	—		40	14
Zira	2025–26	Azerbaijan Premier League	0	0	0	0	0	0	—		0	0
Zira	Total		46	11	7	3	8	5	-	-	61	19
Cong An Ho Chi Minh City (loan)	2025–26	V.League 1	22	1	2	2	—				24	3
Qabala	2026–27	Azerbaijan Premier League	5	0	1	0	—		—		6	0
Career total			170	28	21	7	10	6	-	-	201	41

== Honours ==
Cong An Ho Chi Minh City

- Vietnamese Cup: 2025–26
