= Qismət Alıyev =

Azerbaijani footballer (born 1996)

Personal information
- Full name: Qismət Qardaşxan oğlu Alıyev
- Date of birth: 24 October 1996 (age 30)
- Place of birth: Azerbaijan
- Height: 1.80 m (5 ft 11 in)
- Position: Midfielder

Team information
- Current team: Zira
- Number: 32

Youth career
- Gabala

Senior career*
Years	Team	Apps	(Gls)
2015–2020	Gabala	70	(1)
2020–	Zira	176	(13)

International career^{‡}
2015	Azerbaijan U19	3	(1)
2017–2018	Azerbaijan U21	9	(0)
2022–	Azerbaijan	22	(0)
- * Club domestic league appearances and goals as of 22 June 2026 ‡ National team caps and goals as of 16:50, 15 November 2026 (UTC)

Qismət Qardaşxan oğlu Alıyev (born 24 October 1996) is an Azerbaijani professional footballer who plays as a midfielder for Zira in the Azerbaijan Premier League.

== Career ==
=== Club ===
On 28 May 2015, Alıyev made his debut in the Azerbaijan Premier League for Gabala match against Baku.

On 5 October 2021, Alıyev signed for Zira from Gabala.

== Career statistics ==
=== Club ===
As of match played 27 February 2026

Appearances and goals by club, season and competition
Club	Season	League			National cup (Note: Includes Azerbaijan Cup)		Continental		Other		Total	
Club	Season	Division	Apps	Goals	Apps	Goals	Apps	Goals	Apps	Goals	Apps	Goals
Qabala	2014–15	Azerbaijan Premier League	1	0	0	0	0 (Note: Appearances in the UEFA Europa League)	0	-		1	0
Qabala	2015–16	Azerbaijan Premier League	6	0	1	0	0	0	-		7	0
Qabala	2016–17	Azerbaijan Premier League	3	0	2	0	1	0	-		6	0
Qabala	2017–18	Azerbaijan Premier League	24	0	5	0	0	0	-		29	0
Qabala	2018–19	Azerbaijan Premier League	12	0	3	0	0	0	-		15	0
Qabala	2019–20	Azerbaijan Premier League	19	1	2	0	2	0	-		23	1
Qabala	2020–21	Azerbaijan Premier League	5	0	0	0	-		-		5	1
Qabala	Total		70	1	13	0	3	0	0	0	86	1
Zira	2020–21	Azerbaijan Premier League	22	2	4	0	-		-		26	2
Zira	2021–22	Azerbaijan Premier League	27	2	4	0	-		-		31	2
Zira	2022–23	Azerbaijan Premier League	34	0	3	0	2 (Note: Appearances in the UEFA Conference League)	0	-		39	0
Zira	2023–24	Azerbaijan Premier League	34	6	6	0	-		-		40	6
Zira	2024–25	Azerbaijan Premier League	28	1	2	0	8 (Note: Two appearances in the UEFA Europa League, six appearances and two goals in the UEFA Conference League)	2	-		38	3
Zira	2025–26	Azerbaijan Premier League	21	2	2	0	2	0	-		25	1
Zira	Total		166	13	21	0	12	2	-	-	199	15
Career total			236	14	34	0	15	2	-	-	285	16

== Honours ==
Gabala

- Azerbaijan Cup (1): 2018–19
