= Ruan Renato =

Brazilian footballer

Personal information
- Full name: Ruan Renato Bonifácio Augusto
- Date of birth: 14 January 1994 (age 32)
- Place of birth: Paulínia, Brazil
- Height: 1.86 m (6 ft 1 in)
- Position: Defender

Team information
- Current team: Zira
- Number: 4

Youth career
- Paulínia
- Red Bull Brasil
- –2015: Mogi Mirim

Senior career*
Years	Team	Apps	(Gls)
2015	Santa Rita	3	(0)
2015–2018	Guaratinguetá	11	(0)
2016–2017	→ Juventude (loan)	46	(2)
2017–2018	→ FK Austria Wien (loan)	6	(0)
2018–2020	Vitoria	7	(0)
2019	→ Figueirense (loan)	44	(1)
2020	→ Botafogo (loan)	4	(0)
2020–2021	Ponte Preta	33	(1)
2021–2023	Gabala	59	(4)
2023–	Zira	98	(11)
- * Club domestic league appearances and goals as of 18 May 2026

Ruan Renato Bonifácio Augusto (born 14 January 1994), known as Ruan Renato, is a Brazilian football player who plays as a defender for Zira.

== Club career ==
Renato made his Campeonato Gaúcho debut for Juventude on 3 February 2016 in a game against Lajeadense.

On 5 August 2021, Renato signed for Azerbaijan Premier League club Gabala.

On 24 June 2023, Zira announced the signing of Renato to a two-year contract.

== Career statistics ==
=== Club ===
As of match played 17 May 2026

Appearances and goals by club, season and competition
Club	Season	League			National Cup		Continental		Other		Total	
Club	Season	Division	Apps	Goals	Apps	Goals	Apps	Goals	Apps	Goals	Apps	Goals
Gabala	2021–22	Azerbaijan Premier League	26	2	5	0	-		-		31	2
Gabala	2022–23	Azerbaijan Premier League	33	2	6	0	2 (Note: Appearances in UEFA Conference League)	0	-		41	2
Gabala	Total		59	4	11	0	2	0	-	-	72	4
Zira	2023–24	Azerbaijan Premier League	34	1	6	1	-		-		40	2
Zira	2024–25	Azerbaijan Premier League	33	4	3	0	8 (Note: Two appearances in the UEFA Europa League and six appearances in the UEFA Conference League)	0	-		44	4
Zira	2025–26	Azerbaijan Premier League	31	7	6	0	2	0	-		39	7
Zira	Total		98	12	15	1	10	0	-	-	123	11
Career total			157	16	26	1	12	0	-	-	195	15
