= Salifou Soumah =

Guinean footballer (born 2003)

Personal information
- Date of birth: 3 October 2003 (age 23)
- Place of birth: Gbessia, Guinea
- Height: 1.78 m (5 ft 10 in)
- Positions: Winger; forward

Team information
- Current team: Panetolikos (on loan from Malmö FF)
- Number: 11

Senior career*
Years	Team	Apps	(Gls)
–2021	AS Kaloum		
2021–2022	Yerköyspor	0	(0)
2022–2023	Le Havre	1	(0)
2022–2023	Le Havre B	15	(0)
2023–2025	Zira	69	(17)
2025–	Malmö FF	7	(0)
2026	→ Radomiak Radom (loan)	12	(1)
2026–	→ Panetolikos (loan)	3	(1)

International career^{‡}
2023	Guinea U23	5	(1)
2025–	Guinea	4	(0)
- * Club domestic league appearances and goals as of 23:30, 20 September 2026 (UTC) ‡ National team caps and goals as of 15 November 2025

Salifou Soumah (born 3 October 2003) is a Guinean professional footballer who plays as a winger or forward for Super League Greece club Panetolikos, on loan from Swedish side Malmö FF, and the Guinea national team.

== Early life ==
Soumah was born on 3 October 2003 in Guinea. Growing up, he regarded Germany international Leroy Sané as his football idol.

== Club career ==
Soumah started his career with Guinean side AS Kaloum Star. Subsequently, he signed for Turkish side Yerköyspor in March 2022. Following his stint there, he signed for French side Le Havre on 31 August 2022, where he made one league appearance and scored zero goals.

Ahead of the 2023–24 season, he signed for Azerbaijani side Zira, where he made sixty-nine league appearances and scored seventeen goals. Two years later, he signed for Swedish side Malmö FF. On 11 February 2026, Soumah moved to Polish side Radomiak Radom on loan with a purchase option.On 20 August 2026, Soumah signed for Greek club Panetolikos on a loan.

== International career ==
Soumah is a Guinea youth international. During the summer of 2023, he played for the Guinea national under-23 football team at the 2023 U-23 Africa Cup of Nations.

== Style of play ==
Soumah plays as a winger or forward and is right-footed. African news website Carréfoot wrote in 2025 that he "displays impressive technical maturity. His explosiveness, combined with excellent reading of the game, makes him an increasingly sought-after player, particularly for his adaptability to different playing styles".

== Career statistics ==
=== International ===
As of match played 15 November 2025

Appearances and goals by national team and year
National team	Year	Apps	Goals
Guinea
Guinea	2025	4	0
Total		4	0
