= Abbas Ibrahim (footballer) =

Nigerian footballer

Personal information
- Date of birth: 2 January 1998 (age 28)
- Place of birth: Idah, Nigeria
- Height: 1.84 m (6 ft 0 in)
- Position: Midfielder

Team information
- Current team: AF Elbasani
- Number: 17

Youth career
- 2014–2015: Kwara
- 2015–2018: Paços de Ferreira

Senior career*
| Years | Team | Apps | (Gls) |
| 2018–2023 | Paços de Ferreira | 10 | (0) |
| 2019 | → Paredes (loan) | 14 | (1) |
| 2019–2020 | → Arouca (loan) | 27 | (0) |
| 2023–2025 | Zira | 34 | (0) |
| 2025– | AF Elbasani | 44 | (1) |
- * Club domestic league appearances and goals as of 24 June 2026

Abbas Ibrahim (born 2 January 1998) is a Nigerian professional footballer who plays as a midfielder for Albanian club AF Elbasani.

== Career ==
Ibrahim made his professional debut for Paços de Ferreira in a 2–0 Taça da Liga loss to S.L. Benfica on 4 December 2018.

On 4 February 2023, Ibrahim signed a two-and-a-half-year contract with Zira in Azerbaijan. On 5 January 2025, Zira announced that Ibrahim had left the club after his contract was ended by mutual agreement.

On 7 January 2025, Kategoria Superiore club AF Elbasani announced the signing of Ibrahim.
