= Aydın Bayramov =

Azerbaijani footballer (born 1996)

Personal information
- Full name: Aydın Elmar oğlu Bayramov
- Date of birth: 18 February 1996 (age 30)
- Place of birth: Baku, Azerbaijan
- Height: 1.82 m (6 ft 0 in)
- Position: Goalkeeper

Team information
- Current team: Zira
- Number: 13

Youth career
- Ravan Baku
- 2017–2018: MOIK Baku
- 2018: Sabah

Senior career*
Years	Team	Apps	(Gls)
2019–2023	Sumgayit	56	(0)
2023–2024	Turan-Tovuz	29	(0)
2024–	Zira	35	(0)

International career^{‡}
2025–	Azerbaijan	2	(0)
- * Club domestic league appearances and goals as of 22 June 2026 ‡ National team caps and goals as of 18:50, 16 November 2025 (UTC)

Aydın Elmar oğlu Bayramov (born 18 February 1996) is an Azerbaijani professional footballer who plays as a goalkeeper for Zira in the Azerbaijan Premier League and the Azerbaijan national team.

== Career ==
=== Club ===
On 8 December 2019, Bayramov made his debut in the Azerbaijan Premier League for Sumgayit in a match against Neftçi Baku.

== Career statistics ==
=== Club ===
As of match played 25 May 2025

Appearances and goals by club, season and competition
Club	Season	Division	League		Cup		Europe		Total	
Club	Season	Division	Apps	Goals	Apps	Goals	Apps	Goals	Apps	Goals
MOIK Baku	2017–18	Azerbaijan First Division	0	0	2	0	—		2	0
Sabah	2018–19	Azerbaijan Premier League	0	0	0	0	—		0	0
Sumgayit	2018–19	Azerbaijan Premier League	0	0	0	0	—		0	0
Sumgayit	2019–20	Azerbaijan Premier League	1	0	1	0	—		2	0
Sumgayit	2020–21	Azerbaijan Premier League	11	0	3	0	0	0	14	0
Sumgayit	2021–22	Azerbaijan Premier League	13	0	2	0	2	0	17	0
Sumgayit	2022–23	Azerbaijan Premier League	31	0	1	0	—		32	0
Sumgayit	Total		56	0	7	0	2	0	65	0
Turan-Tovuz	2023–24	Azerbaijan Premier League	29	0	0	0	—		29	0
Zira	2024–25	Azerbaijan Premier League	31	0	2	0	—		33	0
Zira	2025–26	Azerbaijan Premier League	0	0	0	0	0	0	0	0
Zira	Total		31	0	2	0	0	0	33	0
Career total			116	0	11	0	2	0	129	0

=== International ===
As of match played 16 November 2025

Appearances and goals by national team and year
National team	Year	Apps	Goals
Azerbaijan	2025	2	0
Total		2	0
