= Stephane Acka =

Ivorian footballer (born 1990)

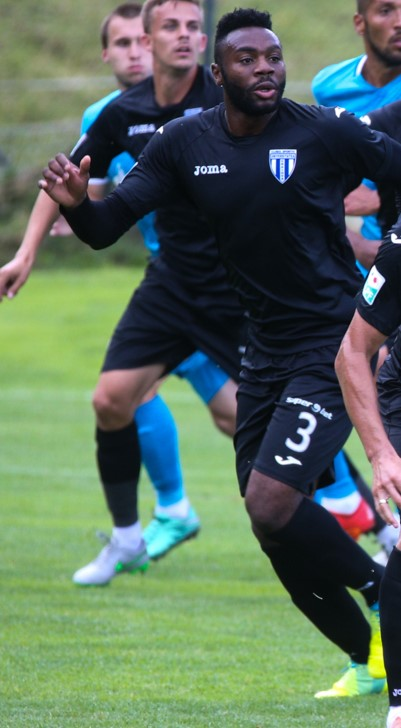

Personal information
- Full name: Stephane Acka
- Date of birth: 11 October 1990 (age 36)
- Place of birth: Abidjan, Ivory Coast
- Height: 1.84 m (6 ft 0 in)
- Position: Defender

Team information
- Current team: Zira FK
- Number: 5

Senior career*
Years	Team	Apps	(Gls)
2010–2012	Legnago Salus	58	(1)
2012–2013	Belluno	30	(1)
2013	FC U Craiova	12	(0)
2014–2017	Universitatea Craiova	79	(1)
2017–2019	BB Erzurumspor	41	(1)
2019–2021	Universitatea Craiova	42	(0)
2021	Ironi Kiryat Shmona	11	(0)
2022–2023	Sektzia Ness Ziona	26	(1)
2023–	Zira FK	55	(0)
- * Club domestic league appearances and goals as of 22 June 2026

Stephane Acka (born 11 October 1990) is an Ivorian professional footballer who plays as a defender for Azerbaijan Premier League club Zira FK. In his career, Acka has played in Italy, Romania, Turkey, Israel and Azerbaijan.

== Personal life ==
Stephane Acka grew up in Verona, Italy, and spent his football formation years in the Hellas Verona youth academy. His brother Lorenzo is also a footballer, who played in the lower leagues of Italy and Romania. They played against each other in a CSM Reșița against Universitatea Craiova game in the sixteenths-finals phase of the 2019–20 Cupa României, which ended with a 1–0 win for Universitatea. Stephane Acka speaks five languages, namely, Italian, Portuguese, Romanian, French and English.

== Honours ==
Universitatea Craiova

- Cupa României: 2020–21
