= Fuad Bayramov (footballer, born 1998) =

Azerbaijani footballer

Personal information
- Full name: Fuad Ehtibar oğlu Bayramov
- Date of birth: 20 May 1998 (age 28)
- Place of birth: Azerbaijan
- Height: 1.81 m (5 ft 11 in)
- Position: Defender

Team information
- Current team: Zira
- Number: 16

Senior career*
Years	Team	Apps	(Gls)
2017–2019	Shuvalan	1	(0)
2019–2021	Sumgayit	0	(0)
2020–2021	Turan-Tovuz	0	(0)
2021–2024	Shamakhi	36	(4)
2023–2024	→ Zira (loan)	26	(2)
2024–	Zira	13	(0)
2026	→ Energetik (loan)		
- * Club domestic league appearances and goals as of 22 June 2026

Fuad Ehtibar oğlu Bayramov (born 20 May 1998) is an Azerbaijani footballer who plays as a defender for Zira in the Azerbaijan Premier League.

== Club career ==
On 29 April 2017, Bayramov made his debut in the Azerbaijan Premier League for Shuvalan match against Zira.
