= Pierre Zebli =

Ivorian footballer (born 1997)

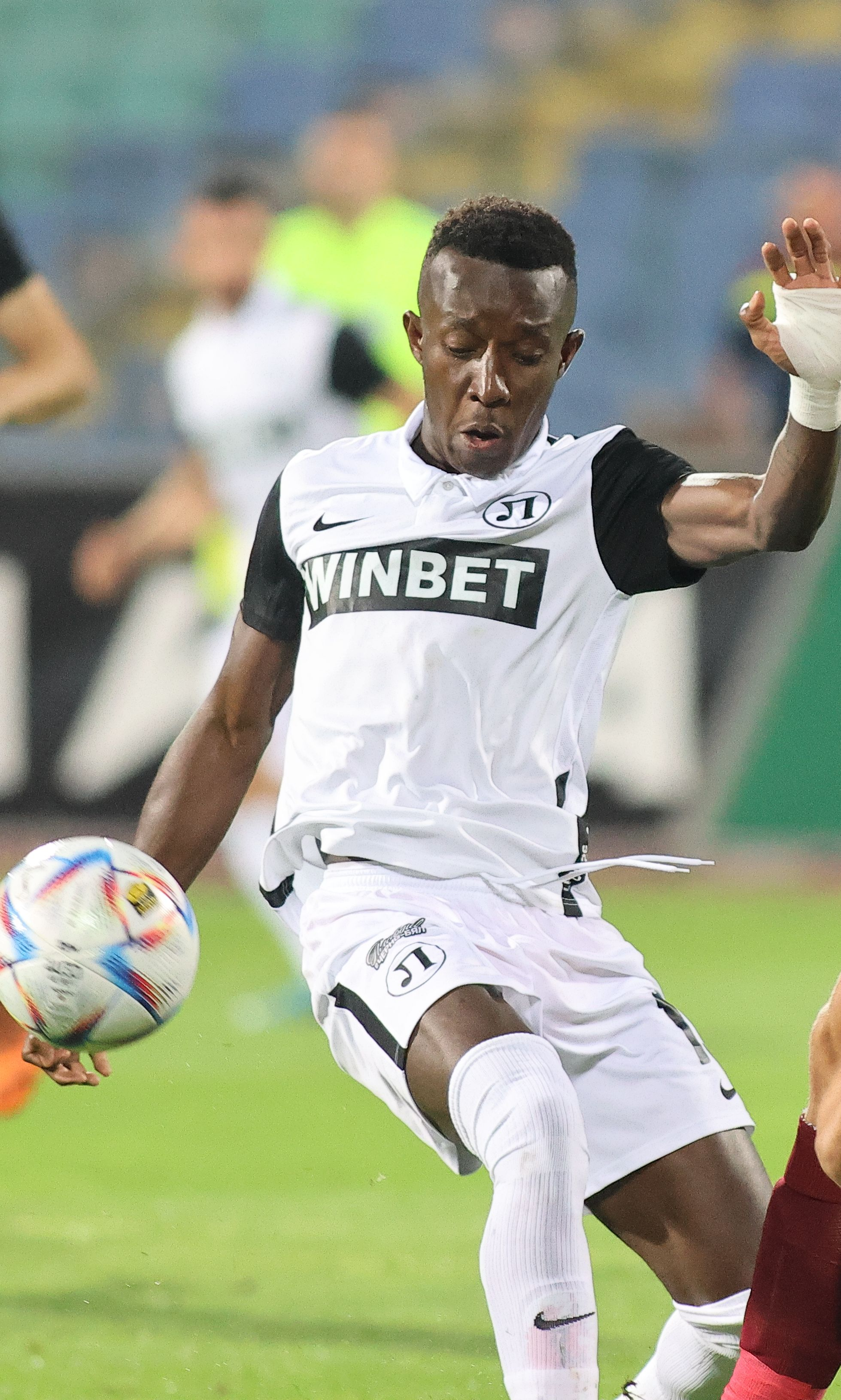
- Pierre Zebli in Lokomotiv Plovdiv

Personal information
- Full name: Pierre Desiré Zebli
- Date of birth: 12 July 1997 (age 29)
- Place of birth: Dabou, Ivory Coast
- Height: 1.80 m (5 ft 11 in)
- Position: Midfielder

Youth career
- 2009–2012: AC Bastia
- 2012–2014: Inter

Senior career*
Years	Team	Apps	(Gls)
2014–2015	Inter	0	(0)
2014–2015	→ Perugia (loan)	1	(0)
2015–2017	Perugia	49	(0)
2017–2021	Genk	0	(0)
2018–2019	→ Ascoli (loan)	3	(0)
2021–2022	Cattolica	11	(0)
2022	Tsarsko Selo	11	(0)
2022–2023	Lokomotiv Plovdiv	31	(0)
2023–2025	Zira	53	(0)

International career
2016	Ivory Coast U20	1	(0)
- * Club domestic league appearances and goals as of 16 December 2025

Pierre Zebli (born 12 June 1997) is an Ivorian professional footballer who plays as a defensive midfielder, most recently for Azerbaijan Premier League club Zira.

== Career ==
Zebli is a youth product of AC Bastia and then Inter Milan. He made his professional debut for Perugia on loan from Inter, in a 2–0 Serie B win over Bari. He formally signed for Perugia in August 2015.

After a couple successful seasons with Perugia, Zebli arrived to Genk on 31 January 2017.

On 7 August 2018, after no appearances in the Belgian league for Genk, he returned to Italy, joining Serie B club Ascoli on a season-long loan. Ascoli held the option of permanent transfer at the end of the loan. On 25 January 2019, Ascoli terminated the loan contract early as Zebli was recovering from two eye surgeries performed to correct detached retina.

In January 2022 he joined Bulgarian team Tsarsko Selo. In June 2022 he signed a three-year contract with another Bulgarian team - Lokomotiv Plovdiv. On 1 August 2023, Zebli became part of the ranks of Azerbaijani team Zira, signing a 2+1 year deal. On 14 June 2025, Zira confirmed the departure of Zebli.

== International career ==
Zebli was born in Ivory Coast, and moved to Italy at a young age with his father. Zebli holds both Ivorian and Italian citizenship. He represented the Italy under-21 Serie B representative team in a 4–0 loss to Iran.

Zebli debuted for the Ivory Coast national under-20 football team in a 3–2 win over Qatar U20 on 21 March 2016.
