= Ceyhun Nuriyev =

Azerbaijani footballer (born 2001)

Personal information
- Full name: Ceyhun Əlövsət oğlu Nuriyev
- Date of birth: 30 March 2001 (age 25)
- Place of birth: Azerbaijan
- Height: 1.79 m (5 ft 10 in)
- Position: Midfielder

Team information
- Current team: Zira
- Number: 29

Youth career
- Keşla

Senior career*
| Years | Team | Apps | (Gls) |
| 2020–2023 | Sabah | 46 | (4) |
| 2023– | Zira | 72 | (8) |

International career^{‡}
| 2017 | Azerbaijan U17 | 2 | (0) |
| 2022 | Azerbaijan U21 | 4 | (1) |
| 2024– | Azerbaijan | 15 | (0) |
- * Club domestic league appearances and goals as of 22 June 2026 ‡ National team caps and goals as of 4 October 2026

Ceyhun Əlövsət oğlu Nuriyev (born 30 March 2001) is an Azerbaijani professional footballer who plays as a midfielder for Zira in the Azerbaijan Premier League and the Azerbaijan national team.

== Career ==
=== Club ===
On 22 August 2020, Nuriyev made his debut in the Azerbaijan Premier League for Sabah in a match against Qarabağ.

=== International ===
Nuriyev made his debut for the senior Azerbaijan national team on 25 March 2024 in a friendly against Bulgaria.
