= Elçin Əlicanov =

Azerbaijani footballer (born 1999)

Personal information
- Full name: Elçin Mübariz oğlu Əlicanov
- Date of birth: 15 July 1999 (age 27)
- Place of birth: Azerbaijan
- Height: 1.81 m (5 ft 11 in)
- Position: Defender

Team information
- Current team: Zira
- Number: 14

Senior career*
Years	Team	Apps	(Gls)
2017–2019	Bine	?	(?)
2019–2021	Zagatala	?	(?)
2021–2024	Kapaz	68	(2)
2024–	Zira	29	(1)
- * Club domestic league appearances and goals as of 22 June 2026

Elçin Mübariz oğlu Əlicanov (born 15 July 1999) is an Azerbaijani footballer who plays as a defender for Zira in the Azerbaijan Premier League.

== Club career ==
On 14 August 2022, Əlicanov made his debut in the Azerbaijan Premier League for Kapaz match against Neftçi.
