= Eldar Kuliyev =

Ukrainian footballer (born 2002)

Personal information
- Full name: Eldar Shakhbazovych Kuliyev
- Date of birth: 24 March 2002 (age 24)
- Place of birth: Kyiv, Ukraine
- Height: 1.82 m (6 ft 0 in)
- Position: Midfielder

Team information
- Current team: Iberia 1999
- Number: 23

Youth career
- 2011–2014: Dynamo Kyiv
- 2014–2017: Dnipro
- 2017: Arsenal Kyiv
- 2017–2019: Shakhtar Donetsk

Senior career*
Years	Team	Apps	(Gls)
2019–2021	Mariupol	7	(0)
2021–2023	Mynai	30	(1)
2023–2026	Zira	78	(2)
2026–	Iberia 1999	0	(0)

International career^{‡}
2022	Ukraine U21	2	(1)
2024	Ukraine U23	1	(0)
- * Club domestic league appearances and goals as of 29 July 2026 ‡ National team caps and goals as of 2 July 2025

Eldar Shakhbazovych Kuliyev (Ukrainian: Ельдар Шахбазович Кулієв; born 24 March 2002) is a Ukrainian professional footballer who plays as a midfielder for Erovnuli Liga club Iberia 1999.

== Club career ==
Born in Kyiv, Kuliyev is a product of the different Ukrainian sportive school systems.

He made his debut for Mariupol in the Ukrainian Premier League as a substituted player in the drawing away match against Inhulets Petrove on 25 October 2020.

On 11 February 2023, Azerbaijan Premier League club Zira announced the signing of Kuliyev to a three-and-a-half-year contract, from Mynai.

== International career ==
On 6 March 2024, Kuliyev was called up by Ruslan Rotan to the Ukraine Olympic football team preliminary squad as a preparation to the 2024 Summer Olympics.
