= Tiago Silva (footballer, born 2000) =

Portuguese footballer

Personal information
- Full name: Tiago Fernando Penela Silva
- Date of birth: 28 March 2000 (age 26)
- Place of birth: Seixal, Portugal
- Height: 1.86 m (6 ft 1 in)
- Position: Goalkeeper

Youth career
- 2009–2010: Arrentela
- 2010–2017: Benfica
- 2017: Belenenses
- 2017–2018: Aves
- 2018–2019: Vitória Guimarães

Senior career*
Years	Team	Apps	(Gls)
2019–2020	Vitória Guimarães B	11	(0)
2020–2022	Leixões	7	(0)
2022–2023	Trofense	20	(0)
2023–2026	Zira	67	(0)
- * Club domestic league appearances and goals as of 7 June 2026

Tiago Fernando Penela Silva (born 28 March 2000) is a Portuguese professional footballer who recently played for Zira in the Azerbaijan Premier League as a goalkeeper (from 2023 to June 2026).

== Club career ==
Born in Seixal, Silva spent most of his youth career in the ranks of S.L. Benfica B, and concluded his development at Vitória SC. He signed a contract with the latter in October 2018, when he was named in their new under-23 team. On 18 May 2019 he made his debut for the already relegated reserve team on the final day of the LigaPro season, in a 2–2 draw at home to FC Porto B.

=== Zira ===
In July 2023, Thiago Silva signed a contract with Zira FK.

On 7 June 2026, Zira announced that Silva had left the club after three-years.
