= Rustam Akhmedzade =

Azerbaijani footballer

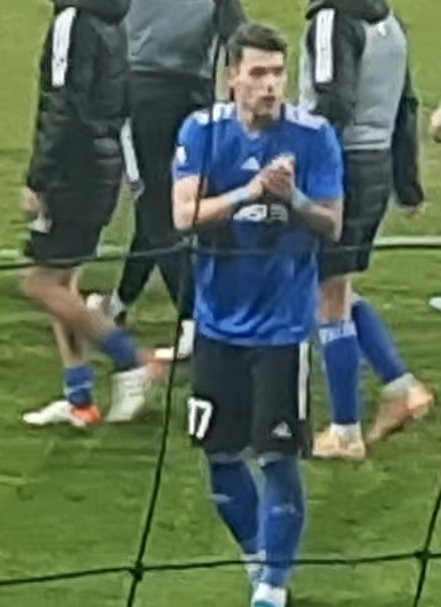
- Akhmedzade with Qarabağ in 2022

Personal information
- Full name: Rustam Alamovych Akhmedzade
- Date of birth: 25 December 2000 (age 25)
- Place of birth: Burtyn, Khmelnytskyi Oblast, Ukraine
- Height: 1.83 m (6 ft 0 in)
- Position: Forward

Team information
- Current team: Sumgayit
- Number: 7

Youth career
- 2011–2017: Zirka Kyiv
- 2017–2018: Oleksandriya
- 2018–2019: Kolos Kovalivka

Senior career*
Years	Team	Apps	(Gls)
2019–2020	Kolos Kovalivka	0	(0)
2020	→ Podillya Khmelnytskyi (loan)	0	(0)
2020–2022	Mynai	38	(3)
2022–2025	Qarabağ	6	(0)
2022–2025	→ Zira (loan)	80	(6)
2025–	Sumgayit	32	(5)

International career^{‡}
2021–	Azerbaijan	15	(1)
- * Club domestic league appearances and goals as of 22 June 2026 ‡ National team caps and goals as of 11:15, 28 March 2026 (UTC)

Rustam Alamovych Akhmedzade (Azerbaijani: Rüstəm Aləm oğlu Əhmədzadə; Ukrainian: Рустам Аламович Ахмедзаде; born 25 December 2000) is a professional footballer who plays as a forward for Azerbaijan Premier League club Sumgayit. Born in Ukraine, he plays for the Azerbaijan national team.

== Club career ==
Akhmedzade was born in Khmelnytskyi Oblast, Ukraine to an Azerbaijani father and Ukrainian mother. At the age of 6, he moved to Kyiv and played football for local side Zirka Kyiv before moving to Oleksandriya at the age of 16. In 2018, he joined FC Kolos Kovalivka.

In February 2020, Akhmedzade signed a half-year loan deal with the Ukrainian Second League Podillya Khmelnytskyi, and in July 2020, Akhmedzade signed a contract with FC Mynai.

Akhmedzade made his Ukrainian First League debut for Mynai in a 2–1 home victory against Metalurh Zaporizhya on 19 July 2020. He scored his first goal for Mynai in the Ukrainian First League match against Avanhard in a 2–0 away victory on 7 August 2020.

On 15 December 2021, Akhmedzade signed for Qarabağ on a contract until 30 June 2026. He was loaned to Zira in July 2022.

On 18 July 2025, Akhmedzade's contract with Qarabağ was terminated by mutual agreement.

== International career ==
Akhmedzade was eligible to represent either Ukraine or Azerbaijan at international level through his parents. He was first called up to the Azerbaijani national team in May 2021 and made his debut in a 2–1 friendly win over Belarus on 2 June 2021.

Scores and results list Azerbaijan goal tally first, score column indicates score after each Akhmedzade goal

List of international goals scored by Rustam Akhmedzade
No.	Date	Venue	Opponent	Score	Result	Competition
1	27 March 2026	Sumgayit City Stadium, Sumgait, Azerbaijan	Saint Lucia	6–1	6–1	2026 FIFA Series

== Honours ==
Mynai

- Ukrainian First League: 2019–20
