= Issa Djibrilla =

Nigerien footballer

Personal information
- Full name: Issa Ibrahim Djibrilla
- Date of birth: 1 January 1996 (age 30)
- Place of birth: Niamey, Niger
- Position: Forward

Team information
- Current team: Zira
- Number: 20

Senior career*
Years	Team	Apps	(Gls)
2018–2020	Sahel		
2020	Rahimo		
2021	Sahel		
2021–2022	Ankara Keçiörengücü	21	(4)
2023–	Zira	67	(9)

International career^{‡}
2020–	Niger	24	(4)
- * Club domestic league appearances and goals as of 22 June 2026 ‡ National team caps and goals as of 4 April 2024

Issa Ibrahim Djibrilla (born 1 January 1996) is a Nigerien professional footballer who plays for Zira in Azerbaijan Premier League and the Nigerien national team.

== Club career ==
On 26 July 2021, Djibrilla was bought outright by the Turkish team Ankara Keçiörengücü.

== International career ==
On 10 October 2020, Djibrilla made his debut in the national team in a friendly match against Chad in a 2 – 0 victory.

On 15 November 2021, he scored his first 2 goals for Niger against Djibouti at the 2022 FIFA World Cup qualifying match in a 7–2 victory.
