= İsmayıl İbrahimli =

Azerbaijani footballer (born 1998)

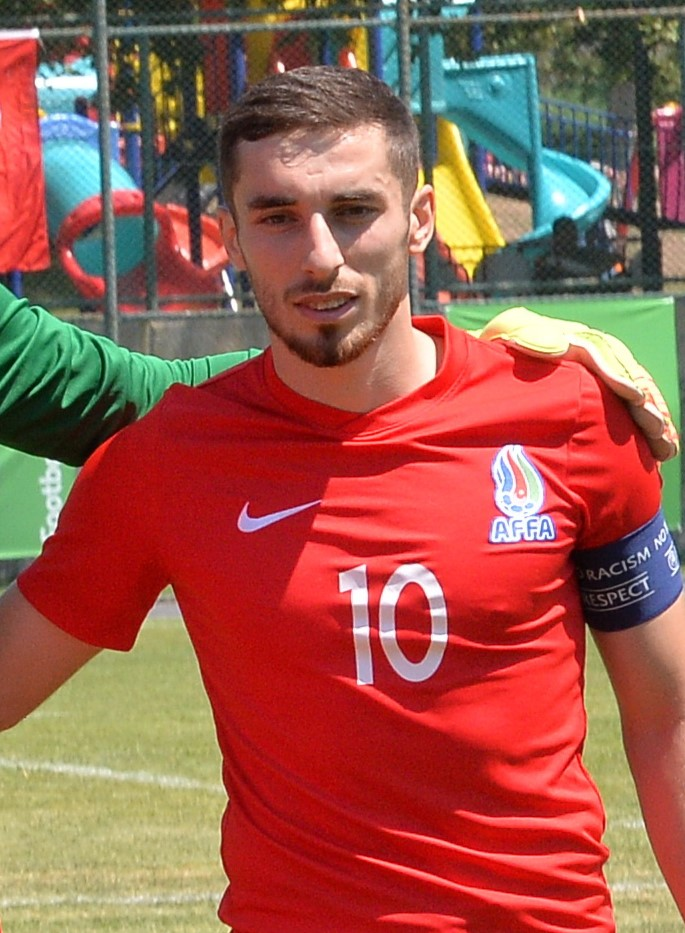

Personal information
- Full name: İsmayıl Xalid oğlu İbrahimli
- Date of birth: 13 February 1998 (age 28)
- Place of birth: Baku, Azerbaijan
- Height: 1.78 m (5 ft 10 in)
- Position: Midfielder

Team information
- Current team: Zira
- Number: 8

Senior career*
Years	Team	Apps	(Gls)
2015–2017	Shuvalan	1	(0)
2017–2018	MOIK Baku	24	(5)
2018–2025	Qarabağ	74	(5)
2023–2025	→ Zira (loan)	62	(1)
2025–	Zira	24	(0)

International career^{‡}
2015	Azerbaijan U19	2	(0)
2018–2019	Azerbaijan U21	16	(0)
2020–	Azerbaijan	8	(0)
Medal record
Men's football
Representing Azerbaijan
Islamic Solidarity Games
Bronze medal – third place	2021 Konya
- * Club domestic league appearances and goals as of 22 June 2026 ‡ National team caps and goals as of 4 May 2023

İsmayıl Xalid oğlu İbrahimli (born 13 February 1998) is an Azerbaijani footballer who plays as an attacking midfielder for Zira and the Azerbaijan national team.

== Club career ==
On 23 August 2015, İbrahimli made his debut in the Azerbaijan Premier League for Shuvalan against Qarabağ.

He joined Azerbaijan First Division side MOIK Baku in summer 2017. He played well for the club during his one season in First Division, scoring five goals from 24 domestic appearances.

İbrahimli signed a contract with Qarabağ FK in June 2018. He made his debut for the club on 18 August 2018 in an Azerbaijan Premier League match against Sabail, which Qarabağ won 2–0.

He made his European debut in 2019 against Sevilla in the UEFA Europa League group stage.

On 11 June 2025, İbrahimli's contract with Qarabağ expired and was not renewed. The following day, 12 June 2025, Zira announced the singing of İbrahimli to a two-year contract after spending the previous two season on loan at the club.

== International career ==
On 5 January 2018, İbrahimli was called up Azerbaijan U21 by Rashad Sadygov for a Antalya training camp.

He made his official debut for Azerbaijan U21 on 6 September 2018, against Israel U21 in a EURO-2019 U21 Championship qualification match a 1–1 draw at the Dalga Arena.

On 26 August 2020, İbrahimli was called up Azerbaijan national football team by Gianni De Biasi for against Luxembourg and Cyprus matches.

== Career statistics ==
=== Club ===
As of 22 August 2020

Club	Season	League			Cup		Europe		Other		Total	
Club	Season	Division	Apps	Goals	Apps	Goals	Apps	Goals	Apps	Goals	Apps	Goals
Shuvalan	2015–16	Azerbaijan Premier League	1	0	0	0	—		—		1	0
Shuvalan	2016–17	Azerbaijan Premier League	0	0	0	0	—		—		0	0
MOIK Baku	2017–18	Azerbaijan First Division	24	5	2	1	—		—		26	6
Qarabağ	2018–19	Azerbaijan Premier League	3	0	0	0	—		—		3	0
Qarabağ	2019–20	Azerbaijan Premier League	17	4	2	1	2	0	—		21	5
Qarabağ	2020–21	Azerbaijan Premier League	1	0	0	0	1	0	—		2	0
Career total			46	9	4	2	3	0	0	0	53	11

== Honours ==
Qarabağ

- Azerbaijan Premier League: 2018–19, 2019–20
