= Zira FK =

Azerbaijani football club

Zirə
- Full name: Zirə Futbol Klubu
- Nickname: Qartallar (The Eagles)
- Founded: 28 July 2014; 12 years ago
- Ground: Zira Olympic Sport Complex Stadium
- Capacity: 1,500
- President: Taleh Nasibov
- Manager: Rashad Sadygov
- League: Azerbaijan Premier League
- 2025–26: Azerbaijan Premier League, 5th of 12
- Website: fczire.az
Home colours	Away colours

Zirə Futbol Klubu (pronounced [ziɾæ]) is an Azerbaijani professional football club based in Zirə, Baku. The club competes in the Azerbaijan Premier League.

== History ==
The club was established in 2014 and immediately joined the Azerbaijan First Division.

Despite finishing 2nd in its inaugural season in the Azerbaijan Premier League, the club wasn't allowed to compete in the UEFA Europa League.

On 27 December 2016, Adil Shukurov had his contract as manager terminated by mutual consent, with Aykhan Abbasov taking over as manager until the end of the 2016–17 season.

Aykhan Abbasov resigned as manager on 29 August 2018, with Samir Abasov being announced as his replacement the same day.

On 8 October 2019, Abasov left Zira by mutual consent, with Zaur Hashimov being appointed as manager the following day, until the end of the season.

On 17 July 2020, Rashad Sadygov was announced as Zira's new manager on a three-year contract.

== Domestic history ==
Season	League									Azerbaijan Cup	Top goalscorer		Manager	Kit Manufacturer	Sponsor
Season	Div.	Pos.	Pl.	W	D	L	GS	GA	P	Azerbaijan Cup	Name	League	Manager	Kit Manufacturer	Sponsor
2014–15	2nd	5th	30	19	6	5	61	19	63	Quarterfinal			(Azerbaijan) Bahram Shahguliyev	Kappa	Santral Electric
2015–16	1st	2nd	36	17	11	8	42	31	62	Quarterfinal	(El Salvador) Nelson Bonilla	14	(Azerbaijan) Adil Shukurov	Kappa	Santral Electric
2016–17	1st	4th	28	10	9	9	29	26	39	Quarterfinal	(Paraguay) César Meza Colli	4	(Azerbaijan) Adil Shukurov (Azerbaijan) Aykhan Abbasov	Umbro	Santral Electric
2017–18	1st	4th	28	12	8	8	36	30	44	Quarterfinal	(Ghana) Richard Gadze	7	(Azerbaijan) Aykhan Abbasov	Joma	Santral Electric
2018–19	1st	5th	28	8	7	13	30	40	31	Semifinal	(Paraguay) Julio Rodríguez	8	(Azerbaijan) Aykhan Abbasov (Azerbaijan) Samir Abbasov	Joma	Santral Electric
2019–20	1st	4th	20	6	5	9	25	37	23	Semifinal	(Paraguay) Julio Rodríguez (Azerbaijan) Nijat Suleymanov	4	(Azerbaijan) Samir Abbasov (Azerbaijan) Zaur Hashimov	Joma	Santral Electric
2020–21	1st	4th	28	8	14	6	28	28	38	Semifinal	(Georgia (country)) Davit Volkovi	8	(Azerbaijan) Rashad Sadygov	Joma	Santral Electric
2021–22	1st	3rd	28	13	8	7	33	27	47	Runners-up	(Georgia (country)) Davit Volkovi	11	(Azerbaijan) Rashad Sadygov	Joma	Santral Electric
2022–23	1st	5th	36	13	11	12	45	46	50	Quarterfinal	(France) Hamidou Keyta	8	(Azerbaijan) Rashad Sadygov	Joma	Santral Electric
2023–24	1st	2nd	36	16	10	10	33	22	58	Runners-up	(Azerbaijan) Qismət Alıyev	6	(Azerbaijan) Rashad Sadygov	Joma	Santral Electric
2024–25	1st	2nd	36	23	5	8	59	27	74	Quarterfinal	(Guinea) Salifou Soumah	12	(Azerbaijan) Rashad Sadygov	Joma	Santral Electric
2025–26	1st	5th	33	13	14	6	43	36	53	Runners-up	(Brazil) Ruan Renato	8	(Azerbaijan) Rashad Sadygov	Adidas	Zira Olives

== European history ==
As of match played 30 July 2026

Competition	Pld	W	D	L	GF	GA
UEFA Europa League	6	3	1	2	7	6
UEFA Europa Conference League	14	5	5	4	19	18
Total	20	8	6	6	26	24

Season	Competition	Round	Club	Home	Away	Aggregate
2017–18	UEFA Europa League	1QR	(Luxembourg) Differdange 03	2–0	2–1	4–1
2017–18	UEFA Europa League	2QR	(Romania) Astra Giurgiu	0–0	1–3	1–3
2022–23	UEFA Europa Conference League	2QR	(Israel) Maccabi Tel Aviv	0–3	0–0	0–3
2024–25	UEFA Europa League	1QR	(Moldova) Sheriff Tiraspol	1–2 (a.e.t.)	1−0	2–2 (4–5 p)
2024–25	UEFA Conference League	2QR	(Slovakia) DAC Dunajská Streda	4–0	2–1	6–1
2024–25	UEFA Conference League	3QR	(Croatia) Osijek	2–2 (a.e.t.)	1–1	3–3 (2–1 p)
2024–25	UEFA Conference League	POR	(Cyprus) Omonia	1–0	0–6	1–6
2025–26	UEFA Conference League	2QR	(Croatia) Hajduk Split	1–1	1–2 (a.e.t.)	2–3
2026–27	UEFA Conference League	1QR	(Georgia (country)) Torpedo Kutaisi	3–0	3–0	6–0
2026–27	UEFA Conference League	2QR	(Estonia) Paide Linnameeskond	1–1	0–1	1–2

Notes

- 1QR: First qualifying round
- 2QR: Second qualifying round
- 3QR: Third qualifying round
- POR: Play-off round

== Stadium ==
Zira's home ground is the Zira Olympic Sport Complex Stadium, which has a capacity of 1,500.

== Players ==
=== Current squad ===
As of 21 July 2026

Note: Flags indicate national team as defined under FIFA eligibility rules; some limited exceptions apply. Players may hold more than one non-FIFA nationality.

No.	Pos.	Nation	Player
1	GK	BRA	Maycon Cleiton
2	DF	AZE	Amin Seydiyev
3	MF	CIV	Dimitri Legbo
4	DF	BRA	Ruan Renato
5	DF	RWA	Ange Mutsinzi
6	MF	AZE	Hacıağa Hacılı
7	FW	TUR	Eren Aydın
8	MF	AZE	İsmayıl İbrahimli
9	FW	GEO	Davit Volkovi
10	MF	GEO	Giorgi Papunashvili
11	MF	AZE	Aykhan Guseynov
13	GK	AZE	Aydın Bayramov
14	DF	AZE	Elchin Alijanov
16	MF	BRA	Ktatau
17	MF	POR	Vierinha

No.	Pos.	Nation	Player
20	DF	NIG	Issa Djibrilla
21	MF	MOZ	Guima
23	MF	JAM	Damaine Smith
25	DF	BRA	Henrique
27	FW	CIV	Bayéré Junior Loué
29	MF	CIV	Chris Digbeu
32	MF	AZE	Qismət Alıyev (captain)
33	DF	MAR	Mehdi Mchakhchekh
41	GK	AZE	Anar Nazirov
48	MF	AZE	Ramiz Muradov
57	DF	AZE	Yusif Haciyev
72	GK	AZE	Huseynali Guliyev
77	FW	BLR	Yegor Bogomolsky
87	FW	TOG	Abdoul Aziz Batibie

For recent transfers, see Transfers summer 2026.

== Coaching staff ==
Position	Name
Head coach	(Azerbaijan) Rashad Sadygov
Assistant coach	(Azerbaijan) Eltun Yagublu (Azerbaijan) Vagif Pashayev (Azerbaijan) Nariman Huseynov (Azerbaijan) Vugar Mammad (Azerbaijan) Aghabala Ramazanov
Goalkeeping coach	(Azerbaijan) Farhad Valiyev

== Club records ==
=== Top goalscorers ===
As of match played 7 November 2026

	Name	Years	League	Azerbaijan Cup	Continental	Total
1	(Georgia (country)) Davit Volkovi	2020–2022; 2024–Present	41 (123)	3 (18)	5 (14)	49 (155)
2	(Brazil) Raphael Utzig	2024–2026	11 (46)	3 (7)	5 (8)	19 (61)
3	(Guinea) Salifou Soumah	2023–2025	17 (69)	1 (9)	0 (4)	18 (82)
3	(Brazil) Ruan Renato	2023–Present	15 (110)	1 (16)	2 (14)	18 (140)
5	(El Salvador) Nelson Bonilla	2015–2016	14 (29)	3 (2)	0 (0)	17 (31)
6	(Azerbaijan) Qismət Alıyev	2020–Present	14 (187)	0 (26)	2 (16)	16 (229)
7	(Paraguay) Julio Rodríguez	2019	12 (23)	3 (5)	0 (0)	15 (28)
7	(Ghana) Richard Gadze	2017–2018; 2019-2020	13 (46)	0 (4)	2 (4)	15 (54)
7	(France) Hamidou Keyta	2022–2023	13 (46)	2 (6)	0 (2)	15 (54)
10	(Azerbaijan) Aghabala Ramazanov	2020–2022	12 (47)	1 (4)	(-)	13 (51)

=== Most appearances ===
As of match played 7 November 2026

	Name	Years	League	Azerbaijan Cup	Continental	Total
1	(Azerbaijan) Qismət Alıyev	2020–Present	187 (14)	26 (0)	16 (2)	229 (16)
2	(Azerbaijan) Ilkin Muradov	2015–2024	134 (3)	22 (2)	2 (0)	158 (5)
3	(Georgia (country)) Davit Volkovi	2020–2022; 2024–Present	123 (41)	17 (3)	14 (5)	155 (49)
4	(Azerbaijan) Hajiagha Hajili	2020–Present	121 (0)	16 (0)	11 (0)	148 (0)
5	(Brazil) Ruan Renato	2023–Present	110 (15)	16 (1)	14 (2)	140 (18)
6	(Greece) Dimitrios Chantakias	2020–2024	108 (6)	17 (1)	2 (0)	127 (7)
7	(Azerbaijan) Tamkin Khalilzade	2015–2018; 2021–2022	103 (8)	12 (0)	4 (0)	119 (8)
7	(Azerbaijan) İsmayıl İbrahimli	2023–2025, 2025–Present	95 (1)	12 (1)	12 (0)	119 (2)
9	(Azerbaijan) Adil Naghiyev	2015; 2015–2019	96 (6)	7 (2)	2 (0)	105 (8)
10	(Azerbaijan) Rustam Akhmedzade	2022–2025	80 (6)	6 (2)	10 (0)	96 (8)

=== Managerial statistics ===
As of match played 7 November 2026

Name	Nat.	From	To	P	W	D	L	GS	GA	%W	Honours	Notes
Bahram Shahguliyev	Azerbaijan	28 July 2014	July 2015	31	19	6	6	61	20	61.29		
Adil Shukurov	Azerbaijan	July 2015	27 December 2016	56	24	14	18	60	58	42.86		
Aykhan Abbasov	Azerbaijan	27 December 2016	29 August 2018	51	22	16	13	66	52	43.14		
Samir Abbasov	Azerbaijan	29 August 2018	8 October 2019	37	12	10	15	41	50	32.43		
Zaur Hashimov	Azerbaijan	9 October 2019	30 June 2020	16	6	6	4	24	28	37.50		
Rashad Sadygov	Azerbaijan	17 July 2020		255	113	78	64	323	246	44.31		

- Notes:

P – Total of played matches W – Won matches D – Drawn matches L – Lost matches GS – Goal scored GA – Goals against
%W – Percentage of matches won

Nationality is indicated by the corresponding FIFA country code(s).
