= 2025–26 Zira FK season =

Zira FK
2025–26 season
- Manager: Rashad Sadygov
- Stadium: Zira Olympic Sport Complex Stadium
- Premier League: 5th
- Azerbaijan Cup: Runnersup
- UEFA Conference League: Second qualifying round
- Top goalscorer: League: Ruan Renato (8); All: Ruan Renato (8)

The 2025–26 season was the twelfth in the history of Zira FK and the eleventh consecutive season in the Azerbaijan Premier League. Besides the domestic league, Zira will participate in the Azerbaijan Cup, and where knocked out of the UEFA Conference League at the Second qualifying round.

== Season events ==
On 28 May 2025, Zira announced the signing of Brahim Konaté from Şamaxı, to a two-year contract.

On 7 June, Zira announced the signing of Yegor Bogomolsky from Neftçi, to a two-year contract.

On 12 June, Zira announced the permanent signing of İsmayıl İbrahimli from Qarabağ, having previously played for the club on loan, to a two-year contract whilst Anar Nazirov also extended his contract until the summer of 2026.

On 1 July, Zira announced the signing of Rövlan Muradov from Sumgayit, to a two-year contract with the option of an additional year.

On 2 July, Zira announced the signing of Abdul Aziz Batibie from Pumas FC d'Ablogamé, to a four-year contract.

On 8 July, Zira announced the signing of Vincent Thill from Sabah, to a one-year contract, with the option of an additional year.

On 5 August, Zira announced the signing of Namiq Ələsgərov from Sabah, to a two-year contract, with the option of an additional year.

On 11 August, Zira announced the signing of Leroy-Jacques Mickels from Şamaxı, to a two-year contract.

On 11 September, Zira announced the signing of Henrique from Leixões, to a one-year contract, with the option of an additional year.

On 22 October, Zira announced that Vincent Thill had left the club after his contract was terminated by mutual agreement.

On 6 January, Zira announced the signing of Rufat Abdullazade on loan from NK Varaždin until the end of the season, with an option to make the move permanent.

On 9 February, Zira announced the signing of Eren Aydın from Veres Rivne, on a contract until the end of the season.

On 12 February, Zira announced the signing of Anatoliy Nuriyev from Sabah on a contract until the end of the season.

On 17 February, Zira announced that Yegor Bogomolsky had joined Ural Yekaterinburg on loan until the end of the season, with an option to make the move permanent.

On 31 May, Zira announced that Stephane Acka, Ceyhun Nuriyev, Eldar Kuliyev and Leroy-Jacques Mickels had all left the club after their contracts had expired, and that Rufat Abdullazade had returned to NK Varaždin after his loan deal had expired.

== Squad ==
As of match played 23 May 2026

No.	Name	Nationality	Position	Date of birth (age)	Signed from	Signed in	Contract ends	Apps.	Goals
Goalkeepers
13	Aydın Bayramov	(Azerbaijan)	GK	18 February 1996 (age 30)	Turan Tovuz	2024	2026	38	0
41	Anar Nazirov	(Azerbaijan)	GK	8 September 1985 (age 41)	Gabala	2021	2026	26	0
97	Tiago Silva	(Portugal)	GK	28 March 2000 (age 26)	Trofense	2023	2025 (+1)	89	0
Defenders
4	Ruan Renato	(Brazil)	DF	14 January 1994 (age 32)	Gabala	2023	2025	124	14
5	Ange Mutsinzi	(Rwanda)	DF	15 November 1997 (age 28)	Jerv	2024	2027	78	0
14	Elchin Alijanov	(Azerbaijan)	DF	15 July 1999 (age 27)	Kapaz	2024	2026	35	1
26	Stephane Acka	(Ivory Coast)	DF	11 October 1990 (age 35)	Sektzia Ness Ziona	2023		69	0
Midfielders
6	Eldar Kuliyev	(Ukraine)	MF	24 March 2002 (age 24)	Mynai	2023	2026	94	3
7	Rövlan Muradov	(Azerbaijan)	MF	28 March 1998 (age 28)	Sumgayit	2025	2027(+1)	15	0
8	İsmayıl İbrahimli	(Azerbaijan)	MF	13 February 1998 (age 28)	Qarabağ	2025	2027	106	2
10	Giorgi Papunashvili	(Georgia (country))	MF	2 September 1995 (age 31)	Kapaz	2024	2025 (+1)	66	10
11	Martins Júnior	(Brazil)	MF	7 November 1999 (age 26)	Kapaz	2024	2027	65	10
17	Iron Gomis	(France)	MF	9 November 1999 (age 26)	Kasımpaşa	2024	2026	64	3
19	Rufat Abdullazade	(Azerbaijan)	MF	17 January 2001 (age 25)	on loan from NK Varaždin	2026	2026	9	0
20	Issa Djibrilla	(Niger)	MF	1 January 1996 (age 30)	Ankara Keçiörengücü	2023		84	9
21	Hajiagha Hajili	(Azerbaijan)	MF	30 January 1998 (age 28)	Qarabağ	2023		136	0
25	Henrique	(Brazil)	MF	5 January 1995 (age 31)	Leixões	2025	2026(+1)	29	0
29	Ceyhun Nuriyev	(Azerbaijan)	MF	30 March 2001 (age 25)	Sabah	2023	2026	93	10
30	Guima	(Mozambique)	MF	14 November 1995 (age 30)	Iğdır	2025	2027	36	0
32	Qismət Alıyev	(Azerbaijan)	MF	24 October 1996 (age 29)	Gabala	2020		213	15
48	Ramiz Muradov	(Azerbaijan)	MF	6 July 2005 (age 21)	Unattached	2025		1	0
70	Namiq Ələsgərov	(Azerbaijan)	MF	3 February 1995 (age 31)	Sabah	2025	2027(+1)	10	0
73	Anatoliy Nuriyev	(Azerbaijan)	MF	20 May 1996 (age 30)	Sabah	2026	2026	13	1
87	Abdul Aziz Batibie	(Togo)	MF	26 May 2007 (age 19)	Pumas FC d'Ablogamé	2025	2029	2	0
93	Brahim Konaté	(France)	MF	20 March 1996 (age 30)	Şamaxı	2025	2027	30	4
Forwards
9	Davit Volkovi	(Georgia (country))	FW	3 June 1995 (age 31)	Sabah	2024	2026	140	44
22	Eren Aydın	(Turkey)	FW	12 February 2003 (age 23)	Veres Rivne	2026	2026	15	4
28	Leroy-Jacques Mickels (Note: Leroy-Jacques Mickels was born in Germany, but qualified to represent Rwanda, making his debut in 2026.)	(Rwanda)	FW	25 June 1995 (age 31)	Şamaxı	2025	2027	32	4
Out on loan
16	Fuad Bayramov	(Azerbaijan)	DF	20 May 1998 (age 28)	Şamaxı	2024		50	2
23	Raphael Utzig	(Brazil)	FW	8 August 1996 (age 30)	Chungnam Asan	2024	2025	61	19
77	Yegor Bogomolsky	(Belarus)	FW	3 June 2000 (age 26)	Neftçi	2025	2027	22	1
Left during the season
12	Vincent Thill	(Luxembourg)	MF	4 February 2000 (age 26)	Sabah	2025	2026(+1)	0	0

== Transfers ==
=== In ===
Date	Position	Nationality	Name	From	Fee	Ref.
28 May 2025	MF	(France)	Brahim Konaté	Şamaxı	Undisclosed	
7 June 2025	MF	(Belarus)	Yegor Bogomolsky	Neftçi	Undisclosed	
12 June 2025	MF	(Azerbaijan)	İsmayıl İbrahimli	Qarabağ	Undisclosed	
1 July 2025	MF	(Azerbaijan)	Rövlan Muradov	Sumgayit	Undisclosed	
2 July 2025	MF	(Togo)	Abdul Aziz Batibie	Pumas FC d'Ablogamé	Undisclosed	
8 July 2025	MF	(Luxembourg)	Vincent Thill	Sabah	Undisclosed	
5 August 2025	MF	(Azerbaijan)	Namiq Ələsgərov	Sabah	Undisclosed	
11 August 2025	FW	(Rwanda)	Leroy-Jacques Mickels	Şamaxı	Undisclosed	
11 September 2025	MF	(Brazil)	Henrique	Leixões	Undisclosed	
9 February 2026	FW	(Turkey)	Eren Aydın	Veres Rivne	Undisclosed	
12 February 2026	MF	(Azerbaijan)	Anatoliy Nuriyev	Sabah	Free	

=== Loans in ===
Date from	Position	Nationality	Name	From	Date to	Ref.
6 January 2026	MF	(Azerbaijan)	Rufat Abdullazade	NK Varaždin	End of season	

=== Out ===
Date	Position	Nationality	Name	To	Fee	Ref.
28 July 2025	MF	(Guinea)	Salifou Soumah	Malmö	Undisclosed	

=== Loans out ===
Date from	Position	Nationality	Name	From	Date to	Ref.
20 August 2025	FW	(Brazil)	Raphael Utzig	Cong An Ho Chi Minh City	End of the season	
5 February 2026	DF	(Azerbaijan)	Fuad Bayramov	Mingəçevir	End of the season	
17 February 2026	FW	(Belarus)	Yegor Bogomolsky	Ural Yekaterinburg	End of the season	

=== Released ===
Date	Position	Nationality	Name	Joined	Date	Ref
14 June 2025	DF	(Azerbaijan)	Magsad Isayev	Kapaz	14 July 2025	
14 June 2025	MF	(Ivory Coast)	Pierre Zebli	Al-Tadamon	27 December 2025	
15 July 2025	MF	(Nigeria)	Yusuf Lawal	Al-Karkh	19 SEptember 2025	
22 October 2025	MF	(Luxembourg)	Vincent Thill	Waldhof Mannheim	15 January 2026	
31 May 2026	DF	(Ivory Coast)	Stephane Acka			
31 May 2026	MF	(Azerbaijan)	Ceyhun Nuriyev	Araz-Naxçıvan	24 July 2026	
31 May 2026	MF	(Ukraine)	Eldar Kuliyev	Iberia 1999	20 June 2026	
31 May 2026	FW	(Rwanda)	Leroy-Jacques Mickels	Waldhof Mannheim	23 July 2026	

== Friendlies ==
12 January 2026	Zira	3–3	Csíkszereda	Turkey
AZT (UTC+4)	Ələsgərov 10'; Muradov 17' (pen.), 45' (pen.)	Report	Goal

16 January 2026	Zira	2–3	Oleksandriya	Turkey
13:00 AZT (UTC+4)	Bogomolsky 29'; Nuriyev 54'	Report	Goal

16 January 2026	Zira	1–3	Bohemians 1905	Turkey
18:00 AZT (UTC+4)	Renato 41'	Report	Goal

== Competitions ==
=== Overall record ===
Competition	First match	Last match	Starting round	Final position	Record							
Competition	First match	Last match	Starting round	Final position	Pld	W	D	L	GF	GA	GD	Win %
Premier League	19 August 2025	23 May 2026	Matchday 1	5th	33	13	14	6	43	36	+7	39.39
Azerbaijan Cup	2 December 2025	13 May 2026	Round of 16	Runnersup	6	3	2	1	6	2	+4	50.00
UEFA Conference League	23 July 2025	31 July 2025	Second qualifying round	Second qualifying round	2	0	1	1	2	3	−1	0.00
Total					41	16	17	8	51	41	+10	39.02

Last updated: 23 May 2026
Source: Competitions

=== Premier League ===
==== League table ====
Pos	Team	Pld	W	D	L	GF	GA	GD	Pts	Qualification or relegation
3	Turan Tovuz (Note: UEFA removed Turan Tovuz for a past match-fixing case.)	33	17	8	8	44	27	+17	59 (Note: Matches won: Turan-Tovuz 17, Neftçi 16.)	
4	Neftçi	33	16	11	6	57	32	+25	59	Qualification for the Conference League second qualifying round
5	Zira	33	13	14	6	43	36	+7	53	Qualification for the Conference League first qualifying round
6	Araz-Naxçıvan	33	13	7	13	44	58	−14	46	
7	Sumgayit	33	12	5	16	45	49	−4	41	

Source: Soccerway
Rules for classification: 1) Points; 2) Matches won; 3) Goal difference; 4) Goals scored; 5) Head-to-head points; 6) Head-to-head goal difference; 7) Lower number of points based on yellow and red cards; 8) Draw.

==== Results summary ====
Overall								Home						Away					
Pld	W	D	L	GF	GA	GD	Pts	W	D	L	GF	GA	GD	W	D	L	GF	GA	GD
33	13	14	6	43	36	+7	53	7	8	2	23	16	+7	6	6	4	20	20	0

Last updated: 23 May 2026.

==== Results by round ====
Round	1	2	3	4	5	6	7	8	9	10	11	12	13	14	15	16	17	18	19	20	21	22	23	24	25	26	27	28	29	30	31	32	33
Ground	H	A	H	A	H	A	H	A	H	A	H	H	A	H	A	H	A	H	A	H	A	A	H	H	A	H	A	H	A	H	A	H	A
Result	D	W	W	D	W	D	D	L	W	W	D	W	W	W	L	D	D	L	W	W	L	W	D	L	W	D	D	D	D	W	D	W	L
Position	8	4	1	3	1	1	4	5	3	3	4	4	2	3	3	3	4	5	4	3	4	4	4	4	4	4	4	4	4	4	5	5	5

Updated to match(es) played on 23 May 2026. Source:
A = Away; H = Home; W = Win; D = Draw; L = Loss

==== Matches ====
19 August 2025 1	Zira	1–1	Araz-Naxçıvan	Zirə
20:00 AZT (UTC+4)	Renato (yellow card) 17'; Djibrilla 45+1'; Volkovi (yellow card) 75'	Report	Andrade (yellow card) 43'; Santos (yellow card) 55'; Hasanalizade 65'	Stadium: Zira Olympic Sport Complex Stadium; Attendance: 1,000; Referee: Rəvan Həmzəzadə

25 August 2025 2	Gabala	1–2	Zira	Qabala
19:00 AZT (UTC+4)	Aliyev 17'; Shahniyarov (yellow card) 46'; Rashidov (yellow card) 90+2'; Sierra (yellow card) 90+5'	Report	Renato (yellow card) 22'; C.Nuriyev 32', 45+1'; Papunashvili (yellow card) 70'; Gomis (yellow card) 90+5'	Stadium: City Stadium; Attendance: 1,000; Referee: İnqilab Məmmədov

30 August 2025 3	Zira	5–0	Kapaz	Zirə
18:00 AZT (UTC+4)	Alıyev 13'; Djibrilla 33'; Júnior 38'; Bogomolsky 71'; Ələsgərov (yellow card) 82'; Volkovi 85'	Report	Mammadov (yellow card) 14'; Gomes (yellow card) 45+3'	Stadium: Zira Olympic Sport Complex Stadium; Attendance: 700; Referee: Kamranbəy Rəhimov

12 September 2025 4	Qarabağ	1–1	Zira	Baku
20:00 (UTC+4)	Janković (yellow card) 75'; Borges 81'	Report	Renato 39' (pen.); Bogomolsky (yellow card) 57'; Djibrilla (yellow card) 77'; Alıyev (yellow card) 80'	Stadium: Azersun Arena; Attendance: 1,400; Referee: Reshad Ahmedov

19 September 2025 5	Zira	2–1	Şamaxı	Zirə
18:30 AZT (UTC+4)	Gomis (yellow card) 62'; Júnior 83', 87' (yellow card) 83'	Report	Rossi 25' (yellow card) 84'; Msanga (yellow card) 67'; Agjabayov (yellow card) 77'	Stadium: Zira Olympic Sport Complex Stadium; Attendance: 650; Referee: Cavid Cəlilov

26 September 2025 6	İmişli	1–1	Zira	Imishli
15:30 AZT (UTC+4)	Rollo 24'; Morgan (yellow card) 55'; Rodrigues (yellow card) 74'	Report	Alıyev (yellow card) 17'; Mutsinzi (yellow card) 23'; Volkovi 80'	Stadium: Heydar Aliyev Stadium; Attendance: 200; Referee: Əli Əliyev

3 October 2025 7	Zira	2–2	Neftçi	Zirə
19:30 AZT (UTC+4)	Papunashvili 28'; Gomis (yellow card) 46' (yellow-red card) 90+7'; Silva (yellow card) 87'; C.Nuriyev (yellow card) 90+2'} Renato 90+5' (pen.)	Report	D'Almeida (yellow card) 39'; Vargas 66'; Safarov (yellow card) 72'; Sambou 88'; Badalov (yellow card) 90+4'	Stadium: Zira Olympic Sport Complex Stadium; Attendance: 1,200; Referee: Kamal Umudlu

19 October 2025 8	Sabah	3–0	Zira	Masazir
16:00 AZT (UTC+4)	Malouda (yellow card) 15' (goal) 42'; Simić 45+2', 75'; Sekidika (yellow card) 90'	Report	Júnior (yellow card) 10'	Stadium: Bank Respublika Arena; Attendance: 971; Referee: Cavid Cəlilov

25 October 2025 9	Zira	1–0	Sumgayit	Zirə
18:30 AZT (UTC+4)	Konaté 37' (yellow card) 90'	Report	Akhmedzade (yellow card) 45+1'; Abdullazade (yellow card) 90'	Stadium: Zira Olympic Sport Complex Stadium; Attendance: 800; Referee: Rauf Cabarov

1 November 2025 10	Karvan	2–3	Zira	Shamakhi
14:00 AZT (UTC+4)	Barker 29'; Thompson (yellow card) 59'; Spence 62'; Abdullayev (yellow card) 86'	Report	Mutsinzi (yellow card) 28'; Konaté 57'; Mickels 74'; Gomis 87'	Stadium: City Stadium; Attendance: 120; Referee: Kamranbəy Rəhimov

8 November 2025 11	Zira	0–0	Turan Tovuz	Zirə
18:44 AZT (UTC+4)	Renato (yellow card) 35'; Gomis (yellow card) 44'; Konaté (yellow card) 45'; Alıyev (yellow card) 45+1'	Report	Miller (yellow card) 45'; Olabe (yellow card) 45' (yellow-red card) 61'; Baklov (yellow card) 88'	Stadium: Zira Olympic Sport Complex Stadium; Attendance: 1,200; Referee: Aliyar Aghayev

22 November 2025 12	Zira	1–0	Gabala	Zirə
17:30 AZT (UTC+4)	Júnior (yellow card) 42'; Renato 45+3' (pen.); Alıyev (yellow card) 53'; Acka (yellow card) 69'	Report	Mammadov (yellow card) 18'; Sangaré (penalty missed) 29'; Ba Loua (yellow card) 63'; Amoah (yellow card) 72'	Stadium: Zira Olympic Sport Complex Stadium; Attendance: 800; Referee: Elvin Bayramov

28 November 2025 13	Kapaz	0–2	Zira	Ganja
14:00 AZT (UTC+4)	Hüseynli (yellow card) 57'	Report	Mickels 62'; Djibrilla 84'; Gomis (yellow card) 90+4'	Stadium: City Stadium; Attendance: 1,000; Referee: Reshad Ahmedov

6 December 2025 14	Zira	1–1	Qarabağ	Zirə
17:00 AZT (UTC+4)	Djibrilla 31'	Report	Henrique 44' (o.g.); Zoubir (yellow card) 86'; Janković (yellow card) 90+2'; Montiel (yellow card) 90+2'	Stadium: Zira Olympic Sport Complex Stadium; Attendance: 1,200; Referee: Rauf Cabarov

13 December 2025 15	Şamaxı	2–1	Zira	Shamakhi
14:00 AZT (UTC+4)	Rossi (yellow card) 11' (goal) 62' (pen.); Msanga 54'	Report	Papunashvili 8'; Júnior (yellow card) 44'; Alıyev (yellow card) 77'; Kuliyev (yellow card) 90+6'	Stadium: City Stadium; Attendance: 900; Referee: İnqilab Məmmədov

20 December 2025 16	Zira	0–0	İmişli	Zirə
16:30 AZT (UTC+4)		Report	Banguera (yellow card) 90+1'	Stadium: Zira Olympic Sport Complex Stadium; Attendance: 400; Referee: Cavid Cəlilov

23 January 2026 17	Neftçi	0–0	Zira	Baku
19:00 AZT (UTC+4)		Report		Stadium: Neftçi Arena; Attendance: 1,745; Referee: Fərid Hacıyev

31 January 2026 18	Zira	1–3	Sabah	Zirə
17:00 AZT (UTC+4)	Alıyev (yellow card) 70'; Volkovi 83'	Report	Simić 9'; Lepinjica 22' (yellow card) 82'; Aliyev 27'	Stadium: Zira Olympic Sport Complex Stadium; Attendance: 500; Referee: Kamal Umudlu

8 February 2026 19	Sumgayit	2–3	Zira	Sumgait
18:30 AZT (UTC+4)	Ninković 27'; Beskorovaynyi (yellow card) 42'; Ramalingom 50'; Murata (yellow card) 71'	Report	Volkovi 24'; Alıyev 36'; Papunashvili 89'	Stadium: City Stadium; Attendance: 700; Referee: İnqilab Məmmədov

14 February 2026 20	Zira	1–0	Karvan	Zirə
17:00 AZT (UTC+4)	Volkovi 20'	Report	V.Abdullayev (yellow card) 45+1'; Turabov (yellow card) 74'	Stadium: Zira Olympic Sport Complex Stadium; Attendance: 350; Referee: Kamranbəy Rəhimov

20 February 2026 21	Turan Tovuz	2–0	Zira	Baku
17:00 AZT (UTC+4)	Ozobić 11'; Silva 18'; Ginnelly (yellow card) 75'; Serrano (yellow card) 77'	Report	Renato (yellow card) 43'; Guima (yellow card) 60'; Gomis (yellow card) 90+1'	Stadium: Azersun Arena; Attendance: 250; Referee: Rəvan Həmzəzadə

27 February 2026 22	Araz-Naxçıvan	0–1	Zira	Baku
18:00 AZT (UTC+4)	Rodrigues (yellow card) 64'; Diniyev (yellow card) FT	Report	Gomis 68'; Guima (yellow card) 82'; C.Nuriyev (yellow card) 90+2'; Mutsinzi (yellow card) 90+3'	Stadium: Dalga Arena; Attendance: 60; Referee: Rauf Cabarov

9 March 2026 23	Zira	2–2	Kapaz	Zirə
18:30 AZT (UTC+4)	Aydın 5'; Henrique (yellow card) 80'; Renato 90+7'	Report	Hüseynli 32' (yellow card) 79'; Onanuga (yellow card) 38'; Verdasca 51'; Pachu (yellow card) 52'; Abuladze (yellow card) 82'	Stadium: Zira Olympic Sport Complex Stadium; Attendance: 400; Referee: Kamal Umudlu

14 March 2026 24	Zira	1–3	Qarabağ	Zirə
19:15 AZT (UTC+4)	Henrique (yellow card) 66'; C.Nuriyev 70'	Report	Montiel 22'; Durán 55'; Kady 72'	Stadium: Zira Olympic Sport Complex Stadium; Attendance: 1,200; Referee: Fərid Hacıyev

19 March 2026 25	Karvan	0–1	Zira	Yevlakh
15:00 AZT (UTC+4)	Abdullayev (yellow card) 11'; Rüstəmov (yellow card) 90+1'	Report	Aydın (yellow card) 39'; Henrique (yellow card) 53'; A.Nuriyev 79'	Stadium: City Stadium; Attendance: 2,700; Referee: Rəşad Əhmədov

7 April 2026 26	Zira	1–1	Şamaxı	Zirə
17:15 AZT (UTC+4)	Alıyev (yellow card) 57'; A.Nuriyev (yellow card) 60'; Renato (penalty missed) 65'; Mickels 69'	Report	Abbasov (yellow card) 41'; Balau (red card) 53'; Rossi (yellow card) 77'; Adilkhanov 90+2'	Stadium: Zira Olympic Sport Complex Stadium; Attendance: 300; Referee: Elçin Məsiyev

11 April 2026 27	Sabah	2–2	Zira	Masazir
18:00 AZT (UTC+4)	Mickels 16'; Nogueira 51'; Rakhmonaliev (yellow card) 82'	Report	Renato 32' (pen.); Aydın 41'; Gomis (yellow card) 45+2'; Silva (yellow card) 55'; Djibrilla (yellow card) 62'	Stadium: Bank Respublika Arena; Attendance: 1,320; Referee: Tural Qurbanov

17 April 2026 28	Zira	1–1	Neftçi	Zirə
19:30 AZT (UTC+4)	Djibrilla (yellow card) 50'; Mickels (yellow card) 86'; Konaté 90+4' (yellow card) 90+5'; Júnior (yellow card) 90+5'	Report	Faraj (yellow card) 45' (goal) 64'; Badalov (yellow card) 88'; Balayev (yellow card) 90+5'; Almeida (red card) 90+5'	Stadium: Zira Olympic Sport Complex Stadium; Attendance: 1,200; Referee: İnqilab Məmmədov

27 April 2026 29	Turan Tovuz	1–1	Zira	Tovuz
18:00 AZT (UTC+4)	Sadykhov 22'; Hurtado (yellow card) 83'	Report	Volkovi 63'; Mickels (yellow card) 87'	Stadium: City Stadium; Attendance: 4,000; Referee: Rəvan Həmzəzadə

3 May 2026 30	Zira	1–0	Gabala	Zirə
18:30 AZT (UTC+4)	Konaté (yellow card) 44'; Papunashvili (yellow card) 74'; Júnior 78'; Hacılı (yellow card) 81'	Report		Stadium: Zira Olympic Sport Complex Stadium; Attendance: 150; Referee: Elçin Məsiyev

8 May 2026 31	İmişli	0–0	Zira	Baku
16:30 AZT (UTC+4)	Ganbarov (yellow card) 36'; Juninho (yellow card) 54'; Banguera (yellow card) 88'	Report		Stadium: Lökbatan Olympic Sport Complex Stadium; Attendance: 70; Referee: Kamranbəy Rəhimov

17 May 2026 32	Zira	2–1	Sumgayit	Zirə
18:00 AZT (UTC+4)	Renato 19' (pen.), 90+8' (pen.); Aydın (yellow card) 35'; Alijanov (yellow card) 55'	Report	Ramalingom 45'; Akhmedzade (yellow card) 60'	Stadium: Zira Olympic Sport Complex Stadium; Attendance: 300; Referee: Cavid Cəlilov

23 May 2026 33	Araz-Naxçıvan	3–2	Zira	Baku
19:00 AZT (UTC+4)	Andrade 15'; Mammadov (yellow card) 18'; Santos 33'; Ramon 73'	Report	Renato (yellow card) 33' (goal) 69'; Konaté (yellow card) 50'; Júnior 83' (penalty missed) 90+6'	Stadium: Dalga Arena; Attendance: 200; Referee: Əkbər Əhmədov

=== Azerbaijan Cup ===
2 December 2025 Last 16	Zira	1–0	Neftçi	Zirə
19:00 AZT (UTC+4)	Gomis (yellow card) 109'; Júnior 116' (yellow card) 117'	Report	Sambou (yellow card) 36'; D'Almeida (yellow card) 47'; Ribeiro (yellow card) 98'	Stadium: Zira Olympic Sport Complex Stadium; Attendance: 1,000; Referee: Tural Qurbanov

4 February 2026 Quarter-final 1st leg	Sumgayit	0–0	Zira	Sumgait
17:00 AZT (UTC+4)	Vásquez (yellow card) 57'; Ninković (yellow card) 79'	Report	Júnior (yellow card) 90+3'	Stadium: City Stadium; Attendance: 400; Referee: Javid Jalilov

3 March 2026 Quarter-final 2nd leg	Zira	2–0 (2–0 agg.)	Sumgayit	Zirə
16:00 AZT (UTC+4)	Volkovi 28'; İbrahimli (yellow card) 58'; Nuriyev 88'	Report	Haghverdi (yellow card) 69'; Ninković (red card) 83'	Stadium: Zira Olympic Sport Complex Stadium; Attendance: 600; Referee: Elçin Məsiyev

3 April 2026 Semi-final 1st leg	Turan Tovuz	0–2	Zira	Sumgait
17:30 AZT (UTC+4)		Report	Renato (yellow card) 23'; Aydın 55' (yellow card) 81'; Mickels 89'; Silva (yellow card) 90+1'	Stadium: City Stadium; Attendance: 400; Referee: Əliyar Ağayev

21 April 2026 Semi-final 2nd leg	Zira	0–0 (2–0 agg.)	Turan Tovuz	Zirə
19:00 AZT (UTC+4)	Aydın (yellow card) 70'; Alıyev (yellow card) 90+6'	Report	Jô (yellow card) 44'; Olabe (yellow card) 65'; Sadykhov (yellow card) 86'; Serrano (yellow card) 90+2'	Stadium: Zira Olympic Sport Complex Stadium; Attendance: 1,200; Referee: Əli Əliyev

13 May 2026 Final	Zira	1–2	Sabah	Baku
20:00 AZT (UTC+4)	Alıyev (yellow card) 2'; Aydın 4'; Gomis (yellow card) 53'; Mutsinzi (yellow card) 76'	Report	Malouda (yellow card) 57'; Solvet (yellow card) 66'; Mbina 70'; Mickels 90+1'; Parris (yellow card) 90+6'	Stadium: Neftçi Arena; Attendance: 7,045; Referee: Elçin Məsiyev

=== UEFA Conference League ===
==== Qualifying rounds ====
23 July 2025 Second qualifying round 1st leg	Zira (Azerbaijan)	1–1	(Croatia) Hajduk Split	Baku, Azerbaijan
19:30 AZT (UTC+4)	Konaté 31'; Guima (yellow card) 47'	Report	Šarlija (yellow card) 35'; Capan (yellow card) 45+1'; Kalik 68'; Benrahou (yellow card) 88'	Stadium: Neftçi Arena; Attendance: 5,232; Referee: Christos Vergetis (Greece)
Note: Zira played their home match at the Neftçi Arena in Baku, instead of their regular stadium, the Zira Olympic Sport Complex Stadium, in Zirə, which did not meet UEFA requirements.

31 July 2025 Second qualifying round 2nd leg	Hajduk Split (Croatia)	2–1 (a.e.t.) (3–2 agg.)	(Azerbaijan) Zira	Split, Croatia
23:00 AZT (UTC+4)	Pajaziti (yellow card) 17'; Krovinović 19'; Mlačić (yellow card) 56'; Benrahou 95'	Report	Guima (yellow card) 27' (yellow-red card) 77'; Gomis (yellow card) 64'; Djibrilla 90+3'; Acka (yellow card) 110'; Alıyev (yellow card) 110'	Stadium: Stadion Poljud; Attendance: 30,086; Referee: Luca Pairetto (Italy)

== Squad statistics ==
As of match played 23 May 2026

=== Appearances and goals ===
No.	Pos	Nat	Player	Total		Premier League		Azerbaijan Cup		UEFA Conference League	
No.	Pos	Nat	Player	Apps	Goals	Apps	Goals	Apps	Goals	Apps	Goals
4	DF	(Brazil) BRA	Ruan Renato	40	8	32	8	6	0	2	0
5	DF	(Rwanda) RWA	Ange Mutsinzi	36	0	26+3	0	4+2	0	1	0
6	MF	(Ukraine) UKR	Eldar Kuliyev	8	0	1+6	0	0+1	0	0	0
7	MF	(Azerbaijan) AZE	Rövlan Muradov	15	0	4+7	0	2	0	1+1	0
8	MF	(Azerbaijan) AZE	İsmayıl İbrahimli	31	0	17+7	0	2+3	0	1+1	0
9	FW	(Georgia (country)) GEO	Davit Volkovi	29	7	17+5	6	5	1	1+1	0
10	MF	(Georgia (country)) GEO	Giorgi Papunashvili	33	3	24+5	3	2	0	1+1	0
11	MF	(Brazil) BRA	Martins Júnior	35	6	21+7	5	2+3	1	2	0
13	GK	(Azerbaijan) AZE	Aydın Bayramov	5	0	4	0	1	0	0	0
14	DF	(Azerbaijan) AZE	Elchin Alijanov	14	0	5+6	0	0+2	0	0+1	0
17	MF	(France) FRA	Iron Gomis	35	2	24+3	2	6	0	2	0
19	MF	(Azerbaijan) AZE	Rufat Abdullazade	9	0	6+2	0	0+1	0	0	0
20	MF	(Niger) NIG	Issa Djibrilla	22	4	12+4	4	4	0	2	0
21	MF	(Azerbaijan) AZE	Hacıağa Hacılı	11	0	3+6	0	0+1	0	0+1	0
22	FW	(Turkey) TUR	Eren Aydın	15	4	9+2	2	2+2	2	0	0
25	MF	(Brazil) BRA	Henrique	29	0	19+5	0	4+1	0	0	0
26	DF	(Ivory Coast) CIV	Stephane Acka	19	0	10+3	0	4	0	1+1	0
28	FW	(Rwanda) RWA	Leroy-Jacques Mickels	32	4	11+15	3	2+4	1	0	0
29	MF	(Azerbaijan) AZE	Ceyhun Nuriyev	30	4	11+13	3	2+2	1	0+2	0
30	MF	(Mozambique) MOZ	Guima	29	0	14+7	0	3+3	0	2	0
32	MF	(Azerbaijan) AZE	Qismət Alıyev	39	2	28+3	2	6	0	2	0
70	MF	(Azerbaijan) AZE	Namiq Ələsgərov	10	0	4+6	0	0	0	0	0
73	MF	(Azerbaijan) AZE	Anatoliy Nuriyev	13	1	4+7	1	1+1	0	0	0
87	MF	(Togo) TOG	Abdul Aziz Batibie	2	0	0	0	0	0	1+1	0
93	MF	(France) FRA	Brahim Konaté	30	4	20+4	3	3+2	0	1	1
97	GK	(Portugal) POR	Tiago Silva	36	0	29	0	5	0	2	0
Players away on loan:
77	FW	(Belarus) BLR	Yegor Bogomolsky	22	1	5+14	1	0+2	0	0+1	0
Players who left Zira during the season:

=== Goal scorers ===
Place	Position	Nation	Number	Name	Premier League	Azerbaijan Cup	UEFA Conference League	Total
1	DF	(Brazil)	4	Ruan Renato	8	0	0	8
2	FW	(Georgia (country))	9	Davit Volkovi	6	1	0	7
3	MF	(Brazil)	11	Martins Júnior	5	1	0	6
4	MF	(Niger)	20	Issa Djibrilla	4	0	1	5
5	MF	(Azerbaijan)	29	Ceyhun Nuriyev	3	1	0	4
5	FW	(Rwanda)	28	Leroy-Jacques Mickels	3	1	0	4
5	MF	(France)	93	Brahim Konaté	3	0	1	4
5	FW	(Turkey)	22	Eren Aydın	2	2	0	4
9	MF	(Georgia (country))	10	Giorgi Papunashvili	3	0	0	3
10	MF	(Azerbaijan)	32	Qismət Alıyev	2	0	0	2
10	MF	(France)	17	Iron Gomis	2	0	0	2
12	FW	(Belarus)	77	Yegor Bogomolsky	1	0	0	1
12	MF	(Azerbaijan)	73	Anatoliy Nuriyev	1	0	0	1
				TOTALS	43	6	2	51

=== Clean sheets ===
Place	Position	Nation	Number	Name	Premier League	Azerbaijan Cup	UEFA Conference League	Total
1	GK	(Portugal)	97	Tiago Silva	10	4	0	14
2	GK	(Azerbaijan)	13	Aydın Bayramov	1	1	0	2
				TOTALS	11	5	0	16

=== Disciplinary record ===
Number	Nation	Position	Name	Premier League		Azerbaijan Cup		UEFA Conference League		Total	
Number	Nation	Position	Name	Booked	Sent off (straight red)	Booked	Sent off (straight red)	Booked	Sent off (straight red)	Booked	Sent off (straight red)
4	(Brazil)	DF	Ruan Renato	5	0	1	0	0	0	6	0
5	(Rwanda)	DF	Ange Mutsinzi	3	0	1	0	0	0	4	0
6	(Ukraine)	MF	Eldar Kuliyev	1	0	0	0	0	0	1	0
8	(Azerbaijan)	MF	İsmayıl İbrahimli	0	0	1	0	0	0	1	0
9	(Georgia (country))	FW	Davit Volkovi	1	0	0	0	0	0	1	0
10	(Georgia (country))	MF	Giorgi Papunashvili	2	0	0	0	0	0	2	0
11	(Brazil)	MF	Martins Júnior	5	0	1	0	0	0	6	0
14	(Azerbaijan)	DF	Elchin Alijanov	1	0	0	0	0	0	1	0
17	(France)	MF	Iron Gomis	8	1	2	0	1	0	11	1
20	(Niger)	MF	Issa Djibrilla	3	0	0	0	0	0	3	0
21	(Azerbaijan)	MF	Hacıağa Hacılı	1	0	0	0	0	0	1	0
22	(Turkey)	FW	Eren Aydın	2	0	2	0	0	0	4	0
25	(Brazil)	MF	Henrique	3	0	0	0	0	0	3	0
26	(Ivory Coast)	DF	Stephane Acka	1	0	0	0	1	0	2	0
28	(Rwanda)	FW	Leroy-Jacques Mickels	2	0	0	0	0	0	2	0
29	(Azerbaijan)	MF	Ceyhun Nuriyev	2	0	0	0	0	0	2	0
30	(Mozambique)	MF	Guima	2	0	1	0	3	1	6	1
32	(Azerbaijan)	MF	Qismət Alıyev	7	0	2	0	1	0	10	0
70	(Azerbaijan)	MF	Namiq Ələsgərov	1	0	0	0	0	0	1	0
73	(Azerbaijan)	MF	Anatoliy Nuriyev	1	0	0	0	0	0	1	0
93	(France)	MF	Brahim Konaté	5	0	0	0	0	0	5	0
97	(Portugal)	GK	Tiago Silva	2	0	1	0	0	0	3	0
Players away on loan:
77	(Belarus)	FW	Yegor Bogomolsky	1	0	0	0	0	0	1	0
Players who left Zira during the season:
			TOTALS	59	1	12	0	6	1	77	2
