= 2025–26 Azerbaijan Premier League =

Azerbaijan Premier League
- Season: 2025–26
- Dates: 15 August 2025 – 2026
- Champions: Sabah (1st title)
- Relegated: Karvan
- UEFA Champions League: Sabah
- UEFA Europa League: Qarabag
- UEFA Conference League: Neftçi; Zira
- Matches: 95
- Goals: 238 (2.51 per match)
- Top goalscorer: Joy-Lance Mickels (18 goals)
- All statistics correct as of 24 May 2026.

The 2025–26 Azerbaijan Premier League, also known as Misli Premyer Liqası due to sponsorship reasons, is the 34th season of the Azerbaijan Premier League, the highest-tier football league of Azerbaijan. The season started on 15 August 2025.

Starting from the 2025–26 season, the foreign player quota has been abolished. A mandatory fee will be applied to all foreign players. At the same time, teams that include local players in their line-ups will receive financial bonuses. These bonuses will be funded by the revenues collected from the foreign player fees.

Beginning this season, the number of teams has been increased from 10 to 12. At the end of the 2025–26 season, the team that finishes in 11th place in the Premier League will face the runner-up of the First League in a play-off match held at a neutral venue. The winner of this match will earn a spot in the next season’s Premier League. The team that finishes last will be relegated to the First League, while the First League champion will be promoted to the Premier League, automatically. Ahead of the new season, AFFA's Licensing Commission granted licenses to the following teams: Baku Sporting, Difai, İmişli, Karvan, Kəpəz, Qəbələ, Səbail, and Şamaxı. The official draw ceremony for the 2025–26 season took place on 18 July at the Flame Towers complex.

== Teams ==
=== Team changes ===
Promoted from 2024–25 Azerbaijan First Division	Relegated to 2025–26 Azerbaijan First Division
Gabala, Karvan, Imishli	Sabail

Sabail was relegated to the First Division after eight years in the top tier.

Gabala returned to the top tier after one year of absence, Imishli returned to the top tier after eighteen years of absence, and Karvan returned to the top tier after sixteen years of absence.

Locations of the 2025–26 Azerbaijan Premier League teams

=== Stadia and locations ===
Note: Table lists in alphabetical order.

Team	Year Established	Location	Venue	Capacity
Araz Naxçıvan	1967	Nakhchivan, Baku	Dalga Arena	6,502
Gabala	2005	Qabala	Gabala City Stadium	3,748
Imishli	2022	Imishli	Heydar Aliyev Stadium	8,500
Kapaz	1959	Ganja	Ganja City Stadium	15,343
Karvan Yevlakh	2022	Yevlakh	Yevlakh City Stadium	6,000
Neftchi	1937	Baku	Neftchi Arena	10,289
Qarabağ	1987	Aghdam, Baku	Tofiq Bahramov Stadium	31,200
Sabah	2017	Absheron	Bank Respublika Arena	8,969
Shamakhi	1997	Shamakhi	Shamakhi City Stadium	2,176
Sumgayit	2010	Sumgait	Mehdi Huseynzade Stadium	9,502
Turan Tovuz	2014	Tovuz	Tovuz City Stadium	6,500
Zira	2014	Zira, Baku	Zira Sport Complex	1,256

=== Managerial changes ===
Team	Outgoing manager	Manner of departure	Date of vacancy	Position in table	Incoming manager	Date of appointment
Neftçi	(Azerbaijan national football team) Samir Abbasov	Fired	24 November 2025	7th	(Azerbaijan national football team) Sanan Gurbanov (Acting)	24 November 2025
Neftçi	(Azerbaijan national football team) Sanan Gurbanov (Acting)	End of contract	9 December 2025	8th	(Ukraine national football team) Yuriy Vernydub	9 December 2025
Araz-Naxçıvan	(Azerbaijan national football team) Elmar Bakhshiyev	Mutual Termination	25 December 2025	5th	(Ukraine national football team) Andriy Demchenko	4 January 2026

=== Foreign players ===
Club	Player 1	Player 2	Player 3	Player 4	Player 5	Player 6	Player 7	Player 8	Player 9	Player 10	Player 11	Player 12	Player 13	Player 14	Player 15	Player 16	Player 17	Left during the season
Araz-Naxçıvan	(Brazil national football team) Bruno Franco	(Brazil national football team) Ramon Machado	(Brazil national football team) Wanderson Maranhão	(Benin national football team) Felipe Santos	(Burkina Faso national football team) **Issouf Paro**	(Cape Verde national football team) **Patrick Andrade**	(France national football team) Charles Boli	(France national football team) Hamidou Keyta	(Germany national football team) Ba-Muaka Simakala	(Israel national football team) Bar Cohen	(Morocco national football team) Ayyoub Allach	(Moldova national football team) **Cristian Avram**	(Portugal national football team) Nuno Rodrigues					
Gabala	(Angola national football team) Paulo Guimbila	(Brazil national football team) Eduardo Kunde	(Congo national football team) Domi Massoumou	(France national football team) Ibrahim Sangaré	(Ghana national football team) Isaac Amoah	(Ghana national football team) Prince Owusu	(Ivory Coast national football team) Adriel Ba Loua	(Nigeria national football team) Ismahil Akinade	(Nigeria national football team) Salihu Nasiru	(Spain national football team) Jaime Sierra	(Senegal national football team) Seydina Keita							(Cameroon national football team) **Jeando Fuchs**
İmişli	(Belarus national football team) Andrey Sinenko	(Brazil national football team) Juninho	(Brazil national football team) Ronaldo Rodrigues	(Brazil national football team) Diogo Rollo	(Brazil national football team) Rafael Viegas	(Colombia national football team) Edwin Banguera	(Ghana national football team) Ezekiel Morgan	(Ghana national football team) Yaw Moses	(Portugal national football team) Diogo Almeida	(Serbia national football team) Nikola Karaklajić								
Kapaz	(Brazil national football team) Jefferson Bento	(Brazil national football team) Pachu	(Burkina Faso national football team) **Adama Fofana**	(Georgia national football team) Otar Aptsiauri	(Ivory Coast national football team) Donald Dongo	(Japan national football team) Ryonosuke Ohori	(Mali national football team) Mahamadou Ba	(Nigeria national football team) Olawale Onanuga	(Poland national football team) Kacper Rosa	(Portugal national football team) Pedro Gomes	(Portugal national football team) Diogo Verdasca							(Brazil national football team) Vitor Feijão
Karvan	(DR Congo national football team) Moise Ngwisani	(Rwanda national football team) Joy-Slayd Mickels	(French Guiana national football team) Imani Barker	(Georgia national football team) Nika Chachashvili	(Netherlands national football team) Shaquill Sno	(Nigeria national football team) Olawale Doyeni	(Nigeria national football team) Peter Kings	(Nigeria national football team) Gavi Thompson	(Portugal national football team) Victor Rocha	(São Tomé and Príncipe national football team) **Pedro Mateus**	(Scotland national football team) Kyle Spence	(Sri Lanka national football team) **Sam Durrant**						(Iran national football team) Saeed Irankhah
Neftçi	(Benin national football team) **Sessi D'Almeida**	(Bosnia and Herzegovina national football team) **Kenan Pirić**	(Brazil national football team) Igor Ribeiro	(Cameroon national football team) **Vincent Aboubakar**	(Ecuador national football team) Jordan Rezabala	(France national football team) Imad Faraj	(Germany national football team) Bassala Sambou	(Luxembourg national football team) **Alessio Curci**	(Mali national football team) **Falaye Sacko**	(Montenegro national football team) **Edvin Kuč**	(Nigeria national football team) Ifeanyi Mathew	(Paraguay national football team) Luis Ortíz	(Romania national football team) Cristian Costin	(Senegal national football team) Moustapha Seck	(Venezuela national football team) **Freddy Vargas**			
Qarabağ	(Brazil national football team) Pedro Bicalho	(Brazil national football team) Dani Bolt	(Brazil national football team) Kady Borges	(Brazil national football team) Matheus Silva	(Cape Verde national football team) **Leandro Andrade**	(Colombia national football team) Camilo Durán	(Colombia national football team) Kevin Medina	(Croatia national football team) Fabijan Buntić	(France national football team) Abdellah Zoubir	(Ghana national football team) Emmanuel Addai	(Ivory Coast national football team) Chris Kouakou	(Montenegro national football team) **Marko Janković**	(Poland national football team) Mateusz Kochalski	(Spain national football team) Joni Montiel	(Ukraine national football team) Oleksiy Kashchuk			
Sabah	(Algeria national football team) **Akim Zedadka**	(Brazil national football team) Ygor Nogueira	(Brazil national football team) Andrey Santos	(Croatia national football team) Ivan Lepinjica	(France national football team) Zinédine Ould Khaled	(France national football team) Aaron Malouda	**(Rwanda national football team) Joy-Lance Mickels**	(Guadeloupe national football team) **Steve Solvet**	(Jamaica national football team) **Kaheem Parris**	(Kazakhstan national football team) **Stas Pokatilov**	(Nigeria national football team) Jesse Sekidika	(Poland national football team) **Tymoteusz Puchacz**	(Serbia national football team) **Veljko Simić**	(Slovakia national football team) **Pavol Šafranko**	(Uzbekistan national football team) Umarali Rakhmonaliev			(Bosnia and Herzegovina national football team) Bojan Letić (Serbia national football team) Njegoš Kupusović
Şamaxı	(Brazil national football team) César	(Brazil national football team) António Lara	(Brazil national football team) David Oliveira	(Nigeria national football team) Abdullahi Shuaibu	(Portugal national football team) Ricardo Apolinario	(Portugal national football team) Diogo Balau	(Portugal national football team) Ricardo Fernandes	(Romania national football team) Andrei Tîrcoveanu	(Switzerland national football team) Karim Rossi	(Tanzania national football team) Alphonce Msanga	(Ukraine national football team) Vladyslav Veremyeyev							
Sumgayit	(Benin national football team) Abdoul Rachid Moumini	(Brazil national football team) Keffel	(Burundi national football team) **Trésor Mossi**	(Dominican Republic national football team) **Ronaldo Vásquez**	(France national football team) Rayan Senhadji	(Israel national football team) **Roi Kahat**	(Japan national football team) Masaki Murata	(Madagascar national football team) **Alexandre Ramalingom**	(Pakistan national football team) **Easah Suliman**	(Portugal national football team) Pedro Pinto	(Serbia national football team) Aleksa Janković	(Serbia national football team) Nikola Ninković	(Ukraine national football team) Danylo Beskorovaynyi					
Turan Tovuz	(Brazil national football team) Henrique	(Brazil national football team) Jô	(Cape Verde national football team) **David Tavares**	(Colombia national football team) Haiderson Hurtado	(France national football team) Ibrahima Wadji	(Moldova national football team) **Denis Marandici**	(Panama national football team) **Roderick Miller**	(Portugal national football team) Jorge Silva	(Russia national football team) Sergei Samok	(Spain national football team) Roberto Olabe	(Spain national football team) Álex Serrano	(Tajikistan national football team) **Oleg Baklov**	(Togo national football team) **Emmanuel Hackman**					(Brazil national football team) Alex Souza
Zira	(Belarus national football team) **Yegor Bogomolsky**	(Brazil national football team) Henrique	(Brazil national football team) Martins Júnior	(Brazil national football team) Ruan Renato	(France national football team) Brahim Konaté	(France national football team) Iron Gomis	**(Rwanda national football team) Leroy-Jacques Mickels**	(Georgia national football team) **Giorgi Papunashvili**	(Georgia national football team) **Davit Volkovi**	(Ivory Coast national football team) Stephane Acka	(Mozambique national football team) **Guima**	(Niger national football team) **Issa Djibrilla**	(Portugal national football team) Tiago Silva	(Rwanda national football team) **Ange Mutsinzi**	(Togo national football team) Abdul Aziz Batibie	(Ukraine national football team) Eldar Kuliyev		(Luxembourg national football team) **Vincent Thill**

In italics:' Players that are on loan from another APL side.
In bold: Players that have been capped for their national team.

== League table ==
Pos	Team	Pld	W	D	L	GF	GA	GD	Pts	Qualification or relegation
1	Sabah (C)	33	24	6	3	75	25	+50	78	Qualification for the Champions League first qualifying round
2	Qarabağ	33	21	6	6	71	27	+44	69	Qualification for the Europa League first qualifying round (Note: The 2025–26 Azerbaijan Cup winner (Sabah) qualified for the Europa League first qualifying round. Since Sabah also won the league, the berth was passed to the second place team and the Conference League berths go to the third and fourth placed teams.)
3	Turan Tovuz (Note: UEFA removed Turan Tovuz for a past match-fixing case.)	33	17	8	8	44	27	+17	59 (Note: Matches won: Turan-Tovuz 17, Neftçi 16.)	
4	Neftçi	33	16	11	6	57	32	+25	59	Qualification for the Conference League second qualifying round
5	Zira	33	13	14	6	43	36	+7	53	Qualification for the Conference League first qualifying round
6	Araz-Naxçıvan	33	13	7	13	44	58	−14	46	
7	Sumgayit	33	12	5	16	45	49	−4	41	
8	Shamakhi	33	9	11	13	31	40	−9	38	
9	Imishli	33	7	13	13	23	43	−20	34	
10	Kapaz	33	8	3	22	25	61	−36	27 (Note: Matches won: Kapaz 8, Gabala 7.)	
11	Gabala (O)	33	7	6	20	32	49	−17	27	Qualification to Relegation Play-off
12	Karvan (R)	33	3	6	24	23	66	−43	15	Relegation to Azerbaijan First Division

Source: Soccerway
Rules for classification: 1) Points; 2) Matches won; 3) Goal difference; 4) Goals scored; 5) Head-to-head points; 6) Head-to-head goal difference; 7) Lower number of points based on yellow and red cards; 8) Draw.
(C) Champions; (O) Play-off winners; (R) Relegated

== Results ==
Clubs play each other three times for a total of 33 matches each.

Home \ Away	ARA	GAB	IMI	KAP	KRV	NEF	QAR	SAB	SHA	SUM	TUR	ZIR
Araz-Naxçıvan		2–1	2–0	2–0	2–1	0–4	0–5	2–2	2–0	1–0	1–1	0–1
Araz-Naxçıvan			0–1	2–0	2–1			2–4			0–3	3–2
Gabala	2–1		3–2	3–0	1–1	0–2	1–2	0–1	0–1	0–2	0–3	1–2
Gabala	1–1		0–1			1–3	1–1		3–1			
Imishli	2–2	2–2		0–0	1–1	0–0	0–1	0–3	0–0	1–0	0–1	1–1
Imishli					1–1			0–5		0–2	1–1	0–0
Kapaz	0–2	1–0	0–3		2–3	1–3	1–0	1–3	0–2	3–0	0–2	0–2
Kapaz		0–2	0–1			0–1				2–1	1–1	
Karvan	0–2	1–1	0–3	1–2		1–2	0–2	0–2	0–3	0–2	1–2	2–3
Karvan		1–2		4–1		0–3			1–0	1–1		0–1
Neftçi	2–2	1–0	2–3	5–1	0–0		2–1	0–0	1–1	2–2	0–1	0–0
Neftçi	2–1		6–0				1–5		3–0		0–1	
Qarabağ	5–1	2–0	2–0	1–0	2–0	2–0		3–3	0–0	0–1	1–0	1–1
Qarabağ	6–0		3–0	0–2	7–0			0–1			2–1	
Sabah	4–1	1–0	0–1	1–0	4–1	2–0	2–1		0–0	1–1	2–0	3–0
Sabah		7–1		0–1	2–0	1–2				3–1		2–2
Shamakhi	1–1	0–4	1–0	1–4	3–0	2–2	1–2	1–2		1–2	0–0	2–1
Shamakhi	0–1		0–0	2–0			0–0	0–3			3–2	
Sumgayit	3–2	0–0	1–0	3–0	4–1	0–2	2–4	1–3	1–1		0–3	2–3
Sumgayit	2–1	1–0				1–3	3–4		0–1			
Turan Tovuz	1–2	1–0	0–0	3–0	1–0	0–0	1–2	1–3	2–1	2–1		2–0
Turan Tovuz		3–2			1–0			1–2		2–1		1–1
Zira	1–1	1–0	0–0	5–0	1–0	2–2	1–1	1–3	2–1	1–0	0–0	
Zira		1–0		2–2		1–1	1–3		1–1	2–1		

Legend: Blue = home team win; Yellow = draw; Red = away team win.

== Promotion/relegation play-off ==
28 May 2026
18:30 UTC+04:00

Gabala	2–0	Mingəçevir
Akbar Eyubov 36' (o.g.); Seydina Keita 45+1' (pen.)	Report

Kapital Bank Arena, Sumgait
Attendance: 1,200
Referee: Tural Gurbanov

== Season statistics ==
=== Top scorers ===
As of match played 5 May 2026

Rank	Player	Club	Goals
1	(Rwanda Football Federation) Joy-Lance Mickels	Sabah	19
2	(Football Association of Serbia) Veljko Simić	Sabah	11
3	(The Football Association) Bassala Sambou	Neftçi	10
3	(Association of Football Federations of Azerbaijan) Emin Mahmudov	Neftçi	10
5	(Swiss Football Association) Karim Rossi	Şamaxı	9
6	(German Football Association) Ba-Muaka Simakala	Araz-Naxçıvan	8
6	(Colombian Football Federation) Camilo Durán	Qarabağ	8
6	(Brazilian Football Confederation) Jô	Turan Tovuz	8
6	(Congolese Football Federation) Domi Massoumou	Qabala	8
10	(Association of Football Federations of Azerbaijan) Toral Bayramov	Qarabağ	7
10	(Portuguese Football Federation) Diogo Dos Santos	İmişli	7
10	(Cameroonian Football Federation) Vincent Aboubakar	Neftçi	7
10	(Cape Verdean Football Federation) Leandro Andrade	Qarabağ	7
10	(French Football Federation) Aaron Malouda	Sabah	7
10	(Jamaica Football Federation) Kaheem Parris	Sabah	7

=== Clean sheets ===
As of match played 22 December 2025

Rank	Player	Club	Clean sheets
1	(Kazakhstan Football Federation) Stas Pokatilov	Sabah	8
1	(Tajikistan Football Federation) Oleg Baklov	Turan Tovuz	8
3	(Portuguese Football Federation) Ricardo Fernandes	Şamaxı	6
4	(Football Association of Bosnia and Herzegovina) Kenan Pirić	Neftçi	5
4	(Association of Football Federations of Azerbaijan) Shakhruddin Magomedaliyev	Qarabağ	5
4	(Moldovan Football Federation) Cristian Avram	Araz-Naxçıvan	5
4	(Portuguese Football Federation) Tiago Silva	Zira	5
4	(Football Federation of Belarus) Andrey Sinenko	İmişli	5
9	(Association of Football Federations of Azerbaijan) Mekhti Dzhenetov	Sumgayit	4
10	(Polish Football Association) Mateusz Kochalski	Qarabağ	2

== Attendances ==
Azerbaijan Premier League clubs listed by average home league attendance:

Pos	Club	Average attendance
1	Qarabağ	3,010
2	Neftçhi	2,793
3	Sumqayıt	2,473
4	Turan	2,159
5	Karvan	1,610
6	Sabah	1,390
7	Şamaxi	1,068
8	Kǝpǝz	822
9	Zirǝ	726
10	Qǝbǝlǝ	604
11	Imişli	485
12	Araz	222

== See also ==
- 2025–26 Azerbaijan First League
- 2025–26 Azerbaijan Cup
