= 2024–25 Azerbaijan Premier League =

Azerbaijan Premier League
- Season: 2024–25
- Dates: 2 August 2024 – 24 May 2025
- Champions: Qarabağ (12th title)
- Relegated: Sabail
- UEFA Champions League: Qarabağ
- UEFA Europa League: Sabah
- UEFA Conference League: Araz-Naxçıvan; Zira
- Matches: 155
- Goals: 377 (2.43 per match)
- Top goalscorer: Leandro Andrade (11 goals)
- Longest unbeaten run: Araz-Naxçıvan (15 matches)
- Highest attendance: 9,355
- Total attendance: 275,933
- Average attendance: 1,533

The 2024–25 Azerbaijan Premier League is the 33rd season of the Azerbaijan Premier League, the highest tier football league of Azerbaijan.

On April 27, 2025, in the 32nd round of the Premier League, Qarabağ secured the championship with four rounds remaining after drawing 1–1 against Sabah, thus becoming Premier League champions for the 12th time in their history and for the 4th consecutive time.

This is the last season with 10 participating teams. The league will expand to 12 teams from 2025–26 season.

== Teams ==
=== Team changes ===
| Promoted from 2023–24 Azerbaijan First Division | Relegated to 2024–25 Azerbaijan First Division |
|---|---|
| Shamakhi | Gabala |

Locations of the 2024–25 Azerbaijan Premier League teams

=== Stadia and locations ===
Note: Table lists in alphabetical order.

| Team | Year Established | Location | Venue | Capacity |
|---|---|---|---|---|
| Araz-Naxçıvan | 1967 | Nakhchivan, Baku | Dalga Arena | 6,500 |
| Kapaz | 1959 | Ganja, Tovuz | Tovuz City Stadium | 6,500 |
| Neftchi | 1937 | Baku | Neftchi Arena | 10,260 |
| Qarabağ | 1951 | Aghdam, Baku | Tofiq Bahramov Stadium | 31,200 |
| Sabah | 2017 | Absheron | Bank Respublika Arena | 8,600 |
| Sabail | 2016 | Sabail, Baku | ASCO Arena | 3,200 |
| Shamakhi | 1997 | Shamakhi | Shamakhi City Stadium | 2,200 |
| Sumgayit | 2010 | Sumgait | Mehdi Huseynzade Stadium | 8,700 |
| Turan Tovuz | 1992 | Tovuz | Tovuz City Stadium | 6,500 |
| Zira | 2014 | Zira, Baku | Zira Sport Complex | 1,300 |

=== Stadiums ===
| Araz-Naxçıvan | Kapaz | Qarabağ | Neftçi | Sabah |
| Dalga Arena | Ganja City Stadium | Tofiq Bahramov Stadium | Neftchi Arena | Bank Respublika Arena |
| Capacity: **6,500** | Capacity: **26,120** | Capacity: **31,200** | Capacity: **10,289** | Capacity: **8,969** |
| Sabail | Shamakhi | Sumgayit | Turan Tovuz | Zira |
| ASCO Arena | Shamakhi City Stadium | Mehdi Huseynzade Stadium | Tovuz City Stadium | Zira Sport Complex |
| Capacity: **3,200** | Capacity: **2,176** | Capacity: **9,502** | Capacity: **6,500** | Capacity: **1,256** |

=== Personnel and kits ===
Note: Flags indicate national team as has been defined under FIFA eligibility rules. Players and Managers may hold more than one non-FIFA nationality.

| Team | President | Manager | Captain | Kit manufacturer | Shirt sponsor |
|---|---|---|---|---|---|
| Araz-Naxçıvan | (Azerbaijan) Ramin Akhundov | (Azerbaijan) Elmar Bakhshiyev | (Azerbaijan) Vadim Abdullayev | (Denmark) Hummel | Samaya Ltd |
| Kapaz | (Azerbaijan) Ilgar Nadiri | (Azerbaijan) Azer Baghirov | (Azerbaijan) Vurğun Hüseynov | (Spain) Joma | - |
| Neftçi | (Azerbaijan) Kamran Guliyev | (Azerbaijan) Samir Abbasov | (Azerbaijan) Emin Mahmudov | (Italy) Erreà | SOCAR |
| Qarabağ | (Turkey) Tahir Gozal | (Azerbaijan) Gurban Gurbanov | (France) Abdellah Zoubir | (Germany) Adidas | Azersun |
| Sabah | (Azerbaijan) Magsud Adigozalov | (Russia) Vasili Berezutski | (Azerbaijan) Elvin Jamalov | (United States) Nike | Bank Respublika |
| Sabail | (Azerbaijan) Abdulgani Nurmammadov | (Azerbaijan) Javid Huseynov | (Azerbaijan) Yusif Nabiyev | (Germany) Adidas | ASCO |
| Shamakhi | (Azerbaijan) Elchin Usub | (Azerbaijan) Aykhan Abbasov | (Azerbaijan) Emin Zamanov | (Spain) Joma | |
| Sumgayit | (Azerbaijan) Riad Rafiyev | (Azerbaijan) Vagif Javadov | (Azerbaijan) Vugar Mustafayev | (Germany) Jako | Azerikimya |
| Turan Tovuz | (Azerbaijan) Ogtay Abdullayev | (Turkmenistan) Kurban Berdyev | (Azerbaijan) Şehriyar Aliyev | (Germany) Jako | Huner Group |
| Zira | (Azerbaijan) Taleh Nasibov | (Azerbaijan) Rashad Sadygov | (Azerbaijan) Qismət Alıyev | (Turkey) Arem | Nar, Azfargroup |

=== Managerial changes ===
| Team | Outgoing manager | Manner of departure | Date of vacancy | Position in table | Incoming manager | Date of appointment |
|---|---|---|---|---|---|---|
| Neftçi | (Montenegro national football team) Miodrag Božović | End of contract | 30 June 2024 | Pre-season | (Ukraine national football team) Roman Hryhorchuk | 1 July 2024 |
| Turan Tovuz | (Azerbaijan national football team) Aykhan Abbasov | | | Pre-season | (Turkmenistan national football team) Kurban Berdyev | 25 June 2024 |
| Neftçi | (Ukraine national football team) Roman Hryhorchuk | Mutual Agreement | 7 October 2024 | 9th | (Azerbaijan national football team) Samir Abbasov | 14 October 2024 |
| Sumgayit | (Azerbaijan national football team) Samir Abbasov | Signed by Neftçi | 14 October 2024 | 8th | (Azerbaijan national football team) Vagif Javadov (Interim) | |
| Sabah | (Croatia national football team) Krunoslav Rendulić | Mutual agreement | 25 November 2024 | 5th | (Russia national football team) Vasili Berezutski | 25 November 2024 |
| Sumgayit | (Azerbaijan national football team) Vagif Javadov (Interim) | Made permanent | 8 January 2025 | 6th | (Azerbaijan national football team) Vagif Javadov | 8 January 2025 |

=== Foreign players ===
Each team can use only seven foreign players on the field in each game.

| Club | Player 1 | Player 2 | Player 3 | Player 4 | Player 5 | Player 6 | Player 7 | Player 8 | Player 9 | Player 10 | Player 11 | Player 12 | Player 13 | Player 14 | Player 15 | Player 16 | Left during the season |
|---|---|---|---|---|---|---|---|---|---|---|---|---|---|---|---|---|---|
| Araz-Naxçıvan | (Bosnia and Herzegovina national football team) Mićo Kuzmanović | (Brazil national football team) Jatobá | (Brazil national football team) Ramon Machado | (Brazil national football team) Wanderson Maranhão | (Brazil national football team) Igor Ribeiro | (Brazil national football team) Felipe Santos | (Burkina Faso national football team) Issouf Paro | (Morocco national football team) Ayyoub Allach | (Moldova national football team) **Cristian Avram** | (Paraguay national football team) César Meza Colli | (Portugal national football team) Benny | (Portugal national football team) Nuno Rodrigues | | | | | |
| Kapaz | (Angola national football team) **Paná** | (Belarus national football team) Yegor Khvalko | (Brazil national football team) Pachu | (Georgia national football team) Rati Ardazishvili | (Malta national football team) **Trent Buhagiar** | (Morocco national football team) Karim L'Koucha | (Portugal national football team) Rogério | (Portugal national football team) Diogo Verdasca | (Senegal national football team) Mahamadou Ba | (Tajikistan national football team) **Shervoni Mabatshoev** | | | | | | | (Albania national football team) Redon Mihana (Brazil national football team) Keverton (Brazil national football team) Victor Braga (Mali national football team) Lassana N'Diaye |
| Neftçi | (Belarus national football team) **Yegor Bogomolsky** | (Brazil national football team) Alex Fernandes | (Brazil national football team) Yuri Matias | (Gambia national football team) Dembo Darboe | (Germany national football team) Robert Bauer | (Germany national football team) Bassala Sambou | (Ivory Coast national football team) Erwin Koffi | (Japan national football team) Ryonosuke Ohori | (Montenegro national football team) Edvin Kuč | (Portugal national football team) Raphael Guzzo | (Senegal national football team) Moustapha Seck | (Sierra Leone national football team) Alpha Conteh | (Ukraine national football team) Andriy Shtohrin | | | | (Brazil national football team) Andre Shinyashiki (Colombia national football team) Brayan Moreno (Hungary national football team) **Márk Tamás** (Saint Martin national football team) Keelan Lebon |
| Qarabağ | (Albania national football team) **Redon Xhixha** | (Algeria national football team) **Yassine Benzia** | (Brazil national football team) Kady Borges | (Brazil national football team) Matheus Silva | (Cape Verde national football team) **Leandro Andrade** | (Cape Verde national football team) **Patrick Andrade** | (Colombia national football team) Kevin Medina | (Croatia national football team) Fabijan Buntić | (France national football team) Abdellah Zoubir | (Ghana national football team) Emmanuel Addai | (Montenegro national football team) **Marko Janković** | (Montenegro national football team) **Marko Vešović** | (Poland national football team) **Mateusz Kochalski** | (Ukraine national football team) Oleksiy Kashchuk | | | (Brazil national football team) Júlio Romão (Brazil national football team) Juninho (France national football team) Hamidou Keyta |
| Sabah | (Bosnia and Herzegovina national football team) Bojan Letić | (Brazil national football team) Ygor Nogueira | (Croatia national football team) Ivan Lepinjica | (Germany national football team) Joy-Lance Mickels | (Jamaica national football team) **Kaheem Parris** | (Kazakhstan national football team) **Stas Pokatilov** | (Luxembourg national football team) **Vincent Thill** | (Morocco national football team) **Sofian Chakla** | (Nigeria national football team) Jesse Sekidika | (Serbia national football team) Njegoš Kupusović | (Slovakia national football team) **Pavol Šafranko** | (Malaysia national football team) Jon Irazabal | (Uzbekistan national football team) Umarali Rakhmonaliev | | | | |
| Sabail | (Albania national football team) Amir Bilali | (Guinea-Bissau national football team) **David Gomis** | (Guinea-Bissau national football team) **Madi Queta** | (Israel national football team) Gitay Sofir | (Netherlands national football team) Soulyman Allouch | (Morocco national football team) Ayman Bouali | (Rwanda national football team) **Innocent Nshuti** | (Serbia national football team) Marko Nikolić | (Spain national football team) Gorka Larrucea | (Ukraine national football team) Dmytro Lytvyn | | | | | | | |
| Shamakhi | (Albania national football team) Belajdi Pusi | (Brazil national football team) Michael Thuíque | (France national football team) Brahim Konaté | (Germany national football team) Leroy Mickels | (Montenegro national football team) Vasilije Radenović | (Portugal national football team) Ricardo Fernandes | (Romania national football team) Andrei Tîrcoveanu | (Serbia national football team) Vasilije Bakić | (Tanzania national football team) Alphonce Msanga | (Ukraine national football team) Vladyslav Veremeev | | | | | | | (Belgium national football team) Jonathan Benteke (Georgia national football team) Giorgi Kantaria |
| Sumgayit | (Bosnia and Herzegovina national football team) Slaviša Radović | (Brazil national football team) Alan Dias | (Burundi national football team) **Trésor Mossi** | (Dominican Republic national football team) **Ronaldo Vásquez** | (Georgia national football team) **Giorgi Kharaishvili** | (Guinea national football team) **Momo Yansané** | (Israel national football team) **Roi Kahat** | (Liberia national football team) **Sylvanus Nimely** | (Montenegro national football team) Miloš Milović | (Pakistan national football team) **Easah Suliman** | (Uzbekistan national football team) Jasurbek Jaloliddinov | (Uzbekistan national football team) **Bobur Abdikholikov** | | | | | (Brazil national football team) Fernando Medeiros (Ecuador national football team) Jordan Rezabala (Montenegro national football team) Nikola Vujnović (North Macedonia national football team) Kristijan Velinovski |
| Turan Tovuz | (Brazil national football team) Christian | (Brazil national football team) Jô | (Brazil national football team) Kauan | (Brazil national football team) Alex Souza | (Colombia national football team) Haiderson Hurtado | (Iran national football team) Arash Ghaderi | (Moldova national football team) **Denis Marandici** | (Panama national football team) **Roderick Miller** | (Russia national football team) Aykhan Guseynov | (Russia national football team) Ivan Konovalov | (Russia national football team) Anton Krachkovsky | (Russia national football team) Sergey Samok | (Spain national football team) Álex Serrano | (Togo national football team) **Emmanuel Hackman** | | | (Nigeria national football team) Otto John |
| Zira | (Brazil national football team) Martins Júnior | (Brazil national football team) Filipe Pachtmann | (Brazil national football team) Ruan Renato | (Brazil national football team) Raphael Utzig | (France national football team) Iron Gomis | (Georgia national football team) **Davit Volkovi** | (Georgia national football team) **Giorgi Papunashvili** | (Guinea national football team) Salifou Soumah | (Ivory Coast national football team) Stephane Acka | (Ivory Coast national football team) Pierre Zebli | (Niger national football team) **Issa Djibrilla** | (Nigeria national football team) Yusuf Lawal | (Ukraine national football team) Eldar Kuliyev | (Portugal national football team) Tiago Silva | (Rwanda national football team) **Ange Mutsinzi** | | (Nigeria national football team) Abbas Ibrahim |

In italics:' Players that are on loan from another APL side.
In bold: Players that have been capped for their national team.

== League table ==
| Pos | Team | Pld | W | D | L | GF | GA | GD | Pts | Qualification or relegation |
|---|---|---|---|---|---|---|---|---|---|---|
| 1 | Qarabağ (C) | 36 | 28 | 5 | 3 | 86 | 19 | +67 | 89 | Qualification for the Champions League second qualifying round (Note: Since already qualified Paris Saint-Germain won the Champions League, Qarabağ was promoted to the Champions League second qualifying round as one of the two champions with the highest coefficient in Champions League qualifying.) |
| 2 | Zira | 36 | 23 | 5 | 8 | 59 | 27 | +32 | 74 | Qualification for the Conference League second qualifying round |
| 3 | Araz-Naxçıvan | 36 | 15 | 13 | 8 | 34 | 29 | +5 | 58 | Qualification for the Conference League second qualifying round |
| 4 | Turan Tovuz | 36 | 14 | 13 | 9 | 45 | 39 | +6 | 55 | |
| 5 | Sabah | 36 | 10 | 18 | 8 | 50 | 46 | +4 | 48 | Qualification for the Europa League first qualifying round (Note: Sabah qualified for the Europa League first qualifying round as the 2024–25 Azerbaijan Cup winners.) |
| 6 | Neftçi | 36 | 10 | 13 | 13 | 39 | 49 | −10 | 43 | |
| 7 | Shamakhi | 36 | 9 | 9 | 18 | 32 | 46 | −14 | 36 | |
| 8 | Sumgayit | 36 | 9 | 6 | 21 | 31 | 53 | −22 | 33 | |
| 9 | Kapaz | 36 | 8 | 8 | 20 | 28 | 65 | −37 | 32 | |
| 10 | Sabail (R) | 36 | 4 | 10 | 22 | 28 | 59 | −31 | 22 | Relegation to Azerbaijan First League |

Source: Soccerway
Rules for classification: 1) Points; 2) Matches won; 3) Goal difference; 4) Goals scored; 5) Head-to-head points; 6) Head-to-head goal difference; 7) Lower number of points based on yellow and red cards; 8) Draw.
(C) Champions; (R) Relegated

== Fixtures and results ==
Clubs play each other four times for a total of 36 matches each.

| Home \ Away | ARA | KAP | NEF | QAR | SAB | SEB | SHA | SUM | TUR | ZIR | ARA | KAP | NEF | QAR | SAB | SEB | SHA | SUM | TUR | ZIR |
|---|---|---|---|---|---|---|---|---|---|---|---|---|---|---|---|---|---|---|---|---|
| Araz-Naxçıvan | | 1–0 | 1–1 | 1–4 | 0–1 | 3–2 | 1–0 | 1–0 | 1–0 | 1–1 | | 0–0 | 2–1 | 1–3 | 1–1 | 0–0 | 1–1 | 2–0 | 1–1 | 0–1 |
| Kapaz | 0–2 | | 4–3 | 0–5 | 2–3 | 1–0 | 0–2 | 0–0 | 0–3 | 0–4 | 0–0 | | 1–0 | 0–0 | 3–2 | 1–1 | 1–1 | 1–0 | 5–2 | 0–1 |
| Neftçi | 0–1 | 2–1 | | 0–3 | 0–2 | 3–1 | 2–2 | 1–1 | 0–0 | 2–1 | 1–1 | 2–2 | | 0–1 | 1–1 | 3–0 | 1–0 | 1–0 | 1–1 | 2–4 |
| Qarabağ | 2–0 | 3–0 | 4–0 | | 3–2 | 2–1 | 3–0 | 5–0 | 0–1 | 4–0 | 2–0 | 3–0 | 3–0 | | 1–1 | 5–0 | 3–2 | 2–0 | 1–2 | 1–0 |
| Sabah | 1–1 | 2–2 | 0–0 | 1–1 | | 1–0 | 2–2 | 3–1 | 2–2 | 0–2 | 2–2 | 0–1 | 1–0 | 1–1 | | 3–2 | 3–1 | 0–0 | 2–1 | 1–1 |
| Sabail | 0–2 | 4–0 | 1–1 | 0–3 | 2–4 | | 2–0 | 0–1 | 1–1 | 0–1 | 1–1 | 1–0 | 1–2 | 1–4 | 0–0 | | 0–2 | 1–4 | 0–0 | 0–1 |
| Shamakhi | 0–1 | 1–0 | 0–0 | 0–1 | 3–1 | 0–0 | | 1–0 | 2–2 | 0–2 | 0–1 | 2–1 | 0–2 | 0–1 | 1–0 | 1–1 | | 1–0 | 0–1 | 1–2 |
| Sumgayit | 0–1 | 2–0 | 2–0 | 0–1 | 1–0 | 2–1 | 2–1 | | 2–4 | 0–2 | 0–0 | 3–0 | 2–2 | 0–2 | 3–3 | 0–2 | 1–2 | | 0–1 | 0–3 |
| Turan Tovuz | 1–2 | 2–1 | 1–1 | 0–0 | 1–1 | 1–0 | 3–2 | 1–0 | | 1–0 | 1–0 | 4–0 | 1–2 | 1–4 | 2–1 | 1–1 | 1–1 | 1–2 | | 0–2 |
| Zira | 0–1 | 3–0 | 2–0 | 1–3 | 1–1 | 4–1 | 0–1 | 4–1 | 0–0 | | 1–0 | 2–0 | 1–2 | 3–2 | 1–1 | 1–0 | 3–0 | 3–1 | 1–0 | |

Source: soccerway.com
Legend: Blue = home team win; Yellow = draw; Red = away team win.

== Season statistics ==
=== Top scorers ===
| Rank | Player | Club | Goals |
|---|---|---|---|
| 1 | (Cape Verdean Football Federation) Leandro Andrade | Qarabağ | 15 |
| 2 | (Football Federation of Guinea-Bissau) Salifou Soumah | Zira | 12 |
| 3 | (Georgian Football Federation) Davit Volkovi | Zira | 11 |
| 3 | (Nigeria Football Federation) Jesse Sekidika | Sabah | 11 |
| 4 | (Brazilian Football Confederation) Felipe Santos | Araz-Naxçıvan | 10 |
| 5 | (German Football Association) Joy-Lance Mickels | Sabah | 9 |
| 5 | (Association of Football Federations of Azerbaijan) Nariman Akhundzade | Qarabağ | 9 |
| 5 | (Brazilian Football Confederation) Raphael Utzig | Zira | 9 |
| 5 | (Slovak Football Association) Pavol Šafranko | Sabah | 9 |
| 6 | (Association of Football Federations of Azerbaijan) Filip Ozobić | Neftçi | 8 |
| 6 | (Ukrainian Association of Football) Oleksiy Kashchuk | Qarabağ | 8 |
| 6 | (French Football Federation) Brahim Konaté | Shamakhi | 8 |
| 7 | (French Football Federation) Yassine Benzia | Qarabağ | 7 |
| 7 | (Georgian Football Federation) Giorgi Papunashvili | Zira | 7 |
| 7 | (Brazilian Football Confederation) Alex Souza | Turan Tovuz | 7 |

=== Hat-tricks ===
| Player | For | Against | Result | Date | Ref |
|---|---|---|---|---|---|
| (Georgian Football Federation) Davit Volkovi | Zira | Sabail | 4–1 (H) | 4 August 2024 | |

=== Clean sheets ===
As of match played 4 March 2025

| Rank | Player | Club | Clean sheets |
|---|---|---|---|
| 1 | (Moldovan Football Federation) Cristian Avram | Araz-Naxçıvan | 13 |
| 2 | (Association of Football Federations of Azerbaijan) Aydın Bayramov | Zira | 12 |
| 3 | (Russian Football Union) Ivan Konovalov | Turan Tovuz | 10 |
| 4 | (Association of Football Federations of Azerbaijan) Mekhti Dzhenetov | Sumgayit | 7 |
| 4 | (Portuguese Football Federation) Ricardo Fernandes | Shamakhi | 7 |
| 6 | (Polish Football Association) Mateusz Kochalski | Qarabağ | 6 |
| 7 | (Association of Football Federations of Azerbaijan) Rza Jafarov | Neftçi | 5 |
| 8 | (Croatian Football Federation) Fabijan Buntić | Qarabağ | 4 |
| 8 | (Association of Football Federations of Azerbaijan) Yusif İmanov | Sabah | 4 |
| 8 | (Association of Football Federations of Azerbaijan) Shakhruddin Magomedaliyev | Qarabağ | 4 |
| 8 | (Association of Football Federations of Azerbaijan) Hüseynali Guliyev | Sabail | 4 |
| 8 | (Portuguese Football Federation) Rógerio | Kapaz | 4 |

== Attendances ==
In the 2024/25 season, a total of 275,933 spectators attended the Premier League matches. With 180 games played, the average attendance per match was 1,533. In terms of spectators, Turan Tovuz had the highest figures, with a total of 78,500 fans attending their matches with an average of 4,361 per game.

| # | Club | Average |
|---|---|---|
| 1 | Turan | 4,361 |
| 2 | Neftçi | 2,209 |
| 3 | Sumqayıt | 1,858 |
| 4 | Qarabağ | 1,729 |
| 5 | Sabah | 1,327 |
| 6 | Şamaxi | 1,161 |
| 7 | Kəpəz | 1,033 |
| 8 | Zirə | 753 |
| 9 | Səbail | 642 |
| 10 | Araz-Naxçivan | 256 |

== Records ==
In the 2024/25 season, Turan Tovuz became the 7th team in the 32-year history of the national championships to not concede a single goal in their first 5 matches. The club's match against Neftçi ended in a 0:0 draw, and they went on to defeat Sumgayit, Qarabağ, and Sabail by one unanswered goal each, and Kapaz by three unanswered goals. The last time this record was matched was in the 2016-17 season by Gabala. Turan Tovuz's goalkeeper, Ivan Konozalov, became the second foreign goalkeeper in the history of the national championships to keep a clean sheet in the first 5 matches, following Dmytro Bezotosnyi, who achieved this with Gabala in the 2016/17 season.

For the second time in 32 years, "Neftçi" failed to win any of their first 5 matches. They ended their matches against "Turan Tovuz" and "Shamakhi" in goalless draws, and drew 1:1 with "Sabail" and "Araz-Naxçıvan." The club first experienced this in the 2017/18 season, where they also failed to win in their first 5 matches. That winless streak lasted for 6 games and was only broken in the 7th match.

On September 20, during the 7th round match between Qarabağ and Neftçi, Neftçi player Robert Bauer scored an own goal, becoming the author of the season's first own goal. This was the 234th own goal in the history of the national championships and the 25th own goal scored by the club, setting an unfortunate record in the tournament's history. Additionally, with this goal, Qarabağ celebrated its 34th own goal scored by opponents, further extending its record.

The derby match between Neftçi and Qarabağ held at Neftçi Arena on February 16, 2025, during 23rd tour, became the most attended game of the 2024/25 Premier League season, drawing 9,355 spectators.

== See also ==
- 2024–25 Azerbaijan First Division
- 2024–25 Azerbaijan Cup
