= Andrei Tîrcoveanu =

Romanian footballer

Personal information
- Full name: Andrei Costin Tîrcoveanu
- Date of birth: 22 May 1997 (age 29)
- Place of birth: Bucharest, Romania
- Height: 1.70 m (5 ft 7 in)
- Position: Midfielder

Youth career
- 2004–2014: Dinamo București

Senior career*
Years	Team	Apps	(Gls)
2013–2016	Dinamo II București	22	(4)
2014–2018	Dinamo București	6	(0)
2016	→ Gaz Metan Mediaș (loan)	11	(1)
2017–2018	→ Gaz Metan Mediaș (loan)	25	(0)
2019–2020	Viitorul Constanța	6	(0)
2019–2020	→ Concordia Chiajna (loan)	9	(1)
2020–2023	Botoșani	64	(3)
2023	Argeș Pitești	8	(0)
2024	Pacific FC	22	(2)
2025–2026	Şamaxı	33	(3)

International career
2013	Romania U16	2	(0)
2013–2014	Romania U17	2	(0)
- * Club domestic league appearances and goals as of 3 May 2026

Andrei Costin Tîrcoveanu (born 22 May 1997) is a Romanian professional footballer who plays as a midfielder.

== Early life ==
Tîrcoveanu played youth football with Dinamo București.

== Club career ==
In 2013, he began playing with Dinamo București II in Liga III at the age of 16. He made his debut for the Dinamo București first team in the final match of the 2013–14 season against Botoșani. In February 2016, he was loaned to Liga II side Gaz Metan Mediaș on loan for the remainder of the season. In July 2017, he returned to Gaz Metan Mediaș on another loan. In December 2018, Dinamo Bucuresti terminated the remainder of his contract.

In January 2019, he signed with Liga I side Viitorul Constanța. In September 2019, he was loaned to Liga II side Concordia Chiajna. Shortly after beginning the 2019-20 season, he terminated his contract with Viitorul in August 2020, having to pay an exit clause.

In September 2020, he signed with Liga I side Botoșani on a three-year contract.

In January 2023, he signed a one-and-a-half-year contract with Argeș Pitești. He departed the club in June 2023, upon the club's relegation to Liga II.

In March 2024, Tîrcoveanu signed a one-year contract with an option for an additional year with Canadian Premier League side Pacific FC. The club declined his option for 2025.

In January 2025, he signed a one-and-a-half year contract with Azerbaijan Premier League club Shamakhi.

== International career ==
Tîrcoveanu has represented Romania at youth level.

== Career statistics ==
=== Club ===
As of match played 3 May 2026

Club	Season	League			National cup (Note: Includes Cupa României, Canadian Championship, Azerbaijan Cup)		Europe		Other		Total	
Club	Season	Division	Apps	Goals	Apps	Goals	Apps	Goals	Apps	Goals	Apps	Goals
Dinamo II București	2013–14	Liga I	5	1	–		–		–		5	1
Dinamo II București	2014–15	Liga I	17	3	0	0	–		–		17	3
Dinamo II București	2015–16	Liga I	0	0	2	2	–		–		2	2
Dinamo II București	Total		22	4	2	2	–		–		24	6
Dinamo București	2013–14	Liga I	1	0	0	0	–		–		1	0
Dinamo București	2014–15	Liga I	0	0	0	0	–		0	0	0	0
Dinamo București	2015–16	Liga I	3	0	1	0	–		0	0	21	2
Dinamo București	2016–17	Liga I	1	0	0	0	–		2 (Note: Appearances in Cupa Ligii)	0	3	0
Dinamo București	2018–19	Liga I	1	0	0	0	–		–		1	0
Dinamo București	Total		6	0	1	0	–		2	0	9	0
Gaz Metan Mediaș (loan)	2015–16	Liga II	11	1	–		–		–		11	1
Gaz Metan Mediaș (loan)	2017–18	Liga I	25	0	3	0	–		–		28	0
Viitorul Constanța	2018–19	Liga I	4	0	1	0	–		–		5	0
Viitorul Constanța	2019–20	Liga I	2	0	–		0	0	0	0	2	0
Viitorul Constanța	2020–21	Liga I	0	0	–		–		–		0	0
Viitorul Constanța	Total		6	0	1	0	0	0	0	0	7	0
Concordia Chiajna (loan)	2019–20	Liga II	9	1	1	0	–		–		10	1
Botoșani	2020–21	Liga I	25	1	1	1	0	0	–		26	1
Botoșani	2021–22	Liga I	28	2	1	0	–		0	0	30	2
Botoșani	2022–23	Liga I	11	0	1	0	–		–		12	0
Botoșani	Total		64	3	3	1	0	0	0	0	67	4
Argeș Pitești	2022–23	Liga I	8	0	0	0	–		0	0	8	0
Pacific FC	2024	Canadian Premier League	22	2	3	0	–		0	0	25	2
Şamaxı	2024–25	Azerbaijan Premier League	16	1	–		–		–		16	1
Şamaxı	2025–26	Azerbaijan Premier League	17	2	2	0	–		–		19	2
Şamaxı	Total		33	3	2	0	–		–		35	3
Career total			206	14	16	3	0	0	2	0	224	17

== Honours ==
Gaz Metan Mediaș

- Liga II: 2015–16

Dinamo București

- Cupa Ligii: 2016–17

Viitorul Constanța

- Cupa României: 2018–19
- Supercupa României: 2019
