= Jesse Sekidika =

Nigerian footballer

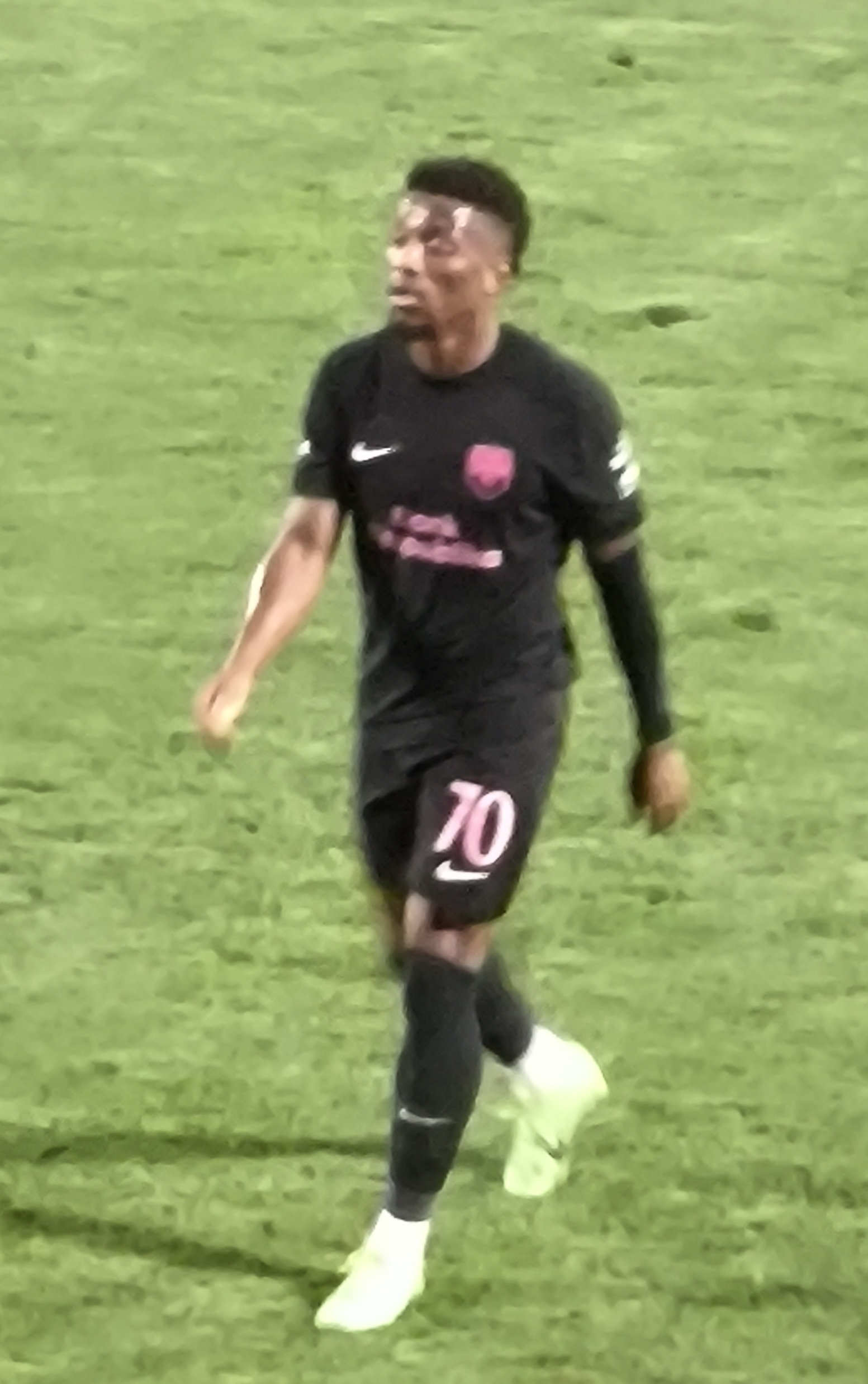
- Sekidika with Sabah in 2025

Personal information
- Full name: Jesse Tamunobaraboye Sekidika
- Date of birth: 14 July 1996 (age 30)
- Place of birth: Port Harcourt, Nigeria
- Height: 1.76 m (5 ft 9 in)
- Position: Winger

Team information
- Current team: Gangwon FC
- Number: 70

Youth career
- 2014: Oeiras
- 2014–2015: Benfica

Senior career*
Years	Team	Apps	(Gls)
2016–2018	Napredak Kruševac	47	(7)
2018–2019	Eskişehirspor	29	(14)
2020–2022	Galatasaray	12	(1)
2021	→ Konyaspor (loan)	19	(1)
2021	→ OH Leuven (loan)	2	(1)
2022	→ Eyüpspor (loan)	15	(1)
2022–2023	Eyüpspor	9	(1)
2023	→ Ümraniyespor (loan)	13	(1)
2023–2026	Sabah	107	(21)
2026–	Gangwon FC	0	(0)
- * Club domestic league appearances and goals as of 31 May 2026

Jesse Tamunobaraboye Sekidika (born 14 July 1996) is a Nigerian professional footballer who plays as a winger for K League 1 club Gangwon FC.

== Early career ==
=== United Kingdom ===
Born in Nigerian metropolis Port Harcourt, Sekidika was first scouted in England while playing as winger at Leicestershire-based private boarding school Brooke House College. After impressing there, he trialed at Stoke City at the 2013 Keele Cup and caught the attention of Manchester United scouts who invited him to train at their Carrington training ground. However, due to the stringent requirement of a British work permit and not having a European Passport, Jesse could not be offered a contract at Stoke City or Manchester United.

=== Portugal ===
In August 2014, Sekidika left UK and moved to Portugal where he joined the youth team of Oeiras, located in the suburb of the same name of the capital Lisbon, which has been a traditional feeder for the country´s bigger teams. At Oeiras, he played the first half of 2014–15 season. By then, he had already been invited to take part of the gatherings and training sessions of the Flying Eagles, the Nigeria national under-20 football team. During last days of the 2014–15 winter-break, he signed with Benfica's youth team. He was part of the Benfica squad that played in the 2014–15 UEFA Youth League in which Benfica reached the quarter-finals. At league level, he made six appearances and scored once for Benfica in the second-half of the 2014–15 First Portuguese youth league.

== Career ==
=== Napredak Kruševac ===
In June 2015, his contract with Benfica expired. However, in the winter break of the 2015–16 season, along with Bohdan Sichkaruk, he joined FK Napredak Kruševac who sought to confirm their second-level title and return to top-flight status. This endeavor left Sekidika mostly off the field. The coach chose to stick with the starting eleven that was giving him good results. Sekidika played the 6 last rounds of the 2015–16 Serbian First League season, scoring in all but one and helped them to a dominant finish as champion and gain promotion to the Serbian top-flight, the SuperLiga.

Inconsistencies at management positions and an uncertain starting line-up, left Napredak end 2016–17 Serbian SuperLiga season in 6th place. Sekidika failed to score that season. After a weak start under Nenad Sakić, in September brought in Milorad Kosanović who made Sekidika a regular in the line up. Napredak finished the season in 7th. Sekidika appeared in 28 games, racking up 3 goals.

In July 2018, Napredak participated in a summer tournament in Portugal where it played against S.L. Benfica. Napredak lost 3–0 in a game played on 10 July. Portuguese media put the focus on Sekidika as a former Benfica player and how he had played against several former teammates. Kosanović convinced the board to sell Sekidika and replace him with domestic players he had coached in previous clubs.

=== Eskişehirspor ===
Sekidika moved to Turkey and signed with Eskişehirspor for a symbolic amount.

=== Galatasaray ===
In January 2020, he signed with Süper Lig side Galatasaray. Sekidika trained hard and played in a friendly against Altay. After the friendly match Sekidika stated that "this is just beginning and I am so excited to play such a great football club".

His contract was terminated by Galatasaray on 15 August 2022.

=== Konyaspor ===
He moved to Konyaspor on loan until the end of the 2020–21 season on 29 January 2021.

=== OH Leuven ===
On 27 August 2021, Galatasaray announced Sekidika would be loaned to Oud-Heverlee Leuven, one of the Belgian First Division A teams, until the end of the season.

=== Eyüpspor ===
On 1 February 2022, Sekidika was loaned out to 1.Lig club Eyüpspor, until the end of the season.

== Career statistics ==
As of match played 11 August 2026

Appearances and goals by club, season and competition
Club	Season	League			National cup (Note: Includes Serbian Cup, Turkish Cup, Belgian Cup, Azerbaijan Cup)		Continental		Other		Total	
Club	Season	Division	Apps	Goals	Apps	Goals	Apps	Goals	Apps	Goals	Apps	Goals
Napredak Kruševac	2015–16	Serbian First League	5	4	—		—		—		5	4
Napredak Kruševac	2016–17	Serbian SuperLiga	11	0	1	0	—		—		12	0
Napredak Kruševac	2017–18	Serbian SuperLiga	28	3	2	0	—		—		30	3
Napredak Kruševac	Total		44	7	3	0	0	0	0	0	47	7
Eskişehirspor	2018–19	TFF 1. Lig	13	6	0	0	—		—		13	6
Eskişehirspor	2019–20	TFF 1. Lig	16	8	0	0	—		—		16	8
Eskişehirspor	Total		29	14	0	0	0	0	0	0	29	14
Galatasaray	2019–20	Süper Lig	6	0	3	0	—		—		9	0
Galatasaray	2020–21	Süper Lig	6	1	1	0	0	0	—		7	1
Galatasaray	2021–22	Süper Lig	0	0	—		3 (Note: Two appearances in UEFA Champions League, one appearance in UEFA Europa League)	0	—		3	0
Galatasaray	Total		12	1	4	0	3	0	0	0	19	1
Konyaspor (loan)	2020–21	Süper Lig	19	1	1	0	—		—		20	1
OH Leuven (loan)	2021–22	Belgian First Division A	2	1	1	0	—		—		3	1
Eyüpspor (loan)	2021–22	TFF 1. Lig	13	1	—		—		2 (Note: Appearance(s) promotion playoff)	0	15	1
Eyüpspor	2022–23	TFF 1. Lig	9	1	2	1	—		—		11	2
Ümraniyespor (loan)	2022–23	Süper Lig	13	1	1	0	—		—		14	1
Sabah FK	2023–24	Azerbaijan Premier League	31	5	3	2	—		—		34	7
Sabah FK	2024–25	Azerbaijan Premier League	36	11	6	1	4 (Note: Appearance(s) in UEFA Conference League)	1	—		46	13
Sabah FK	2025–26	Azerbaijan Premier League	19	1	2	0	6 (Note: Two appearances in UEFA Europa League, four appearances in UEFA Conference League)	0	—		27	1
Sabah FK	Total		86	17	11	3	10	1	0	0	107	21
Gangwon FC	2026	K League 1	4	0	0	0	1 (Note: Appearance(s) in AFC Champions League Elite)	0	—		5	0
Career total			231	44	23	4	14	1	2	0	270	49

== Honours ==
Napredak Kruševac

- Serbian First League: 2015–16

Sabah

- Azerbaijan Premier League: 2025–26
- Azerbaijan Cup: 2024–25, 2025–26
