= Ronaldo Vásquez =

Dominican Republic footballer (b. 1999)

Personal information
- Full name: Ronaldo Junior Vásquez Herasme
- Date of birth: 30 June 1999 (age 27)
- Place of birth: Mao, Dominican Republic
- Height: 1.67 m (5 ft 6 in)
- Positions: Forward; attacking midfielder; winger

Team information
- Current team: Sumgayit FK
- Number: 30

Youth career
- La Meca del Fútbol
- 2013–2016: FCBEscola Santo Domingo
- 2016: Atlético Pantoja

Senior career*
Years	Team	Apps	(Gls)
2016–2020	Atlético Pantoja	8	(0)
2019	→ Hapoel Tel Aviv (loan)	1	(0)
2020–2021	El Ejido	0	(0)
2021–2023	Atlético Pantoja	70	(16)
2024–2025	Guabirá	28	(4)
2025–	Sumgayit FK	48	(10)

International career^{‡}
2018	Dominican Republic U20	5	(5)
2017–	Dominican Republic	53	(7)
- * Club domestic league appearances and goals as of 10 October 2026 ‡ National team caps and goals as of 29 March 2026

Ronaldo Junior Vásquez Herasme (born 30 June 1999) is a Dominican professional footballer who plays as a forward for Azerbaijan Premier League club Sumgayit FK and the Dominican Republic national team.

== Club career ==
Vásquez began his football training in La Meca del Fútbol. In 2013, he joined FCBEscola Santo Domingo, related to the Spanish club FC Barcelona.

In 2016, he made his professional debut in Liga Dominicana de Fútbol playing for Atlético Pantoja, where he was a member of the youth team. In 2017, he moved to the Atlético Pantoja first squad.

== Stats ==
Appearances and goals by club, season and competition
Club	Season	League			National cup		Continental		Other		Total	
Club	Season	Division	Apps	Goals	Apps	Goals	Apps	Goals	Apps	Goals	Apps	Goals
Pantoja	2016	Liga Dominicana de Fútbol										
Pantoja	2017	Liga Dominicana de Fútbol										
Pantoja	2018	Liga Dominicana de Fútbol							1	0	1	0
Pantoja	2019	Liga Dominicana de Fútbol							2	0	2	0
Pantoja	2020	Liga Dominicana de Fútbol							2	0	2	0
Pantoja	Total								5	0	5	0
Hapoel Tel Aviv (loan)	2020	Israeli Premier League	1	0							1	0
El Ejido	2020	Tercera Federación	0	0	0	0	0	0	0	0	0	0
Pantoja	2021	Liga Dominicana de Fútbol	27	3					2	0	29	3
Pantoja	2021	Liga Dominicana de Fútbol	28	9							28	9
Pantoja	2023	Liga Dominicana de Fútbol	23	4					4	0	27	4
Pantoja	Total		78	16					6	0	84	16
Club Deportivo Guabirá	2024	División Profesional	28	4							28	4
Sumgayit	2024-25	Azerbaijan Premier League	15	3	2	0					17	3
Sumgayit	2025-26	Azerbaijan Premier League	27	5	2	2					29	7
Sumgayit	2026-27	Azerbaijan Premier League	6	2							6	2
Sumgayit	Total		48	10	4	2					52	12
Career total			155	30	4	2	0	0	11	0	170	32

== International career ==
Vásquez made his formal debut for Dominican Republic on 22 March 2018, playing an entire 4–0 friendly win against Turks and Caicos Islands, scoring twice. He had played two friendly matches in November 2017 against Nicaragua, but they were not recognised by FIFA.

=== International goals ===
Scores and results list Dominican Republic's goal tally first

No.	Date	Venue	Opponent	Score	Result	Competition
1	22 March 2018	Estadio Olímpico Félix Sánchez, Santo Domingo, Dominican Republic	Turks and Caicos Islands	3–0	4–0	Friendly
2	22 March 2018	Estadio Olímpico Félix Sánchez, Santo Domingo, Dominican Republic	Turks and Caicos Islands	4–0	4–0	Friendly
3	15 November 2022	Estadio Cibao FC, Santiago de los Caballeros, Dominican Republic	Cuba	1–0	2–4	Friendly
4	7 September 2024	ABFA Technical Center, Piggotts, Antigua and Barbuda	Bermuda	3–2	3–2	2024–25 CONCACAF Nations League B
5	10 September 2024	ABFA Technical Center, Piggotts, Antigua and Barbuda	Dominica	1–0	2–0	2024–25 CONCACAF Nations League B
6	12 October 2024	ABFA Technical Center, Piggotts, Antigua and Barbuda	Antigua and Barbuda	5–0	5–0	2024–25 CONCACAF Nations League B
7	21 March 2025	Juan Ramón Loubriel Stadium, Bayamon, Puerto Rico	Puerto Rico	2–1	2–2	Friendly

== National Team Stats ==
As of match played 26 march 2026

Appearances and goals by national team and year
National team	Year	Apps	Goals	Assists
Dominican Republic	2017	2	0	0
Dominican Republic	2018	5	2	1
Dominican Republic	2019	7	0	1
Dominican Republic	2020	0	0	0
Dominican Republic	2021	6	0	0
Dominican Republic	2022	6	1	1
Dominican Republic	2023	7	0	1
Dominican Republic	2024	9	3	1
Dominican Republic	2025	9	1	0
Dominican Republic	2026	2	0	0
Total		53	7	5

== Honors and awards ==
=== Clubs ===
Atlético Pantoja

- Caribbean Club Championship: 2018

=== Individual ===
- Best player: Copa Walon 2016 (playing for Atlético Pantoja)
