= Martins Júnior =

Brazilian poet

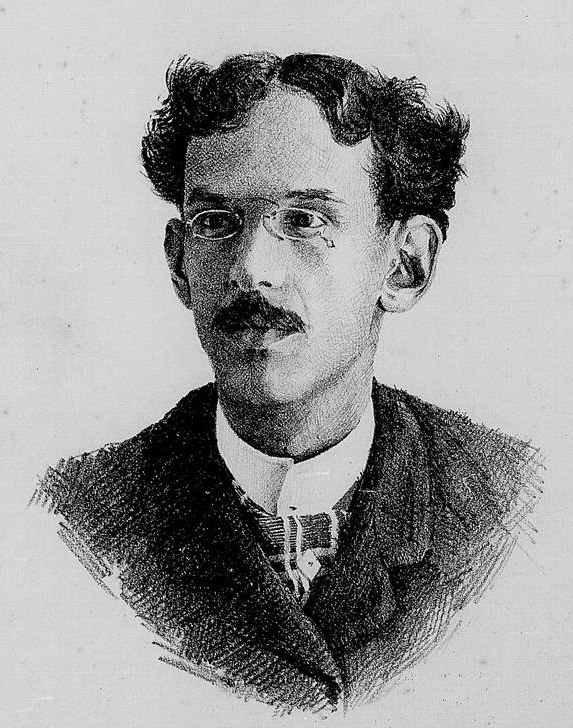
- 1890 portrait
- Born: José Isidoro Martins Júnior; November 24, 1860; Recife, Brazil
- Died: August 22, 1904 (aged 43)

José Isidoro Martins Júnior (November 24, 1860 – August 22, 1904) was a Brazilian poet, intellectual, politician, and professor. Referred to as a ''forgotten master'' by Gilberto Freyre, he was a late representative of the Recife School, and wrote on the philosophy and history of law, as well as on aesthetics.

In his writings, Martins Júnior proposed what he called ''scientific poetry''. He understood that themes such as the cosmos and nature should inspire poets, replacing the lyricism typical of Romantic poetry.

== Biography ==
=== Early life ===
Born in Recife into a modest family, he was educated by his grandfather, Vitorino Martins, and completed his secondary studies at a local school directed by professor Jesuíno Lopes de Miranda, acquiring distinctions in Latin. By the age of thirteen, he was contributing articles to the newspaper A Luz, drawing attention for his intellectual precocity. At fifteen, he co-founded the newspaper O Progresso, where he published his earliest poems as well as articles on literature and politics. This environment of anti-clericalism, abolitionism, and opposition to the Monarchy shaped his intellectual development, and introduced him to Auguste Comte's positivism.

He gave private classes in stenography to support himself while preparing for the entrance exam of the Faculty of Law of Recife, in which he enrolled in 1879. There, he became acquainted with the jurist Clovis Bevilacqua, who would become a close friend, and the diplomat Graça Aranha, and had as professors Tobias Barreto, Duarte Pereira, and Aprígio Guimarães. As a student, he was described as quiet and melancholic, which contrasted with his intensity as an orator. He directed the student journal A Ideia Nova, dedicated to positivist philosophy and literary criticism. His first book, Vigílias literárias, written in collaboration with Clovis Bevilacqua, contained fifty of his poems, and was commented on by Júlio de Castilhos.

=== Career ===
In 1881, at the age of 20, he published the book of poetry Vizões de hoje, regarded as his principal work, in which he calls on the people to fight for republican and abolitionist ideals. Though popular among the youth, the book had a polarized reception, with Machado de Assis questioning its originality and Adherbal de Carvalho firmly criticizing its lyrical value, while Portuguese intellectuals such as Oliveira Martins and Magalhães Lima received it warmly. In 1883, he authored Poesia científica, a manifesto and polemical tract in which he defends the social and political purpose of art, which was followed by the collection of poems Retalhos, achieving less success than its predecessor.

Throughout his student years, Martins Júnior inspired the writers Dias Barroso, Phaelante da Câmara, and Anísio Auto de Abreu. On November 13 1883, he graduated from the Faculty. That same year, the newspaper A Folha do Norte was founded, reuniting young republicans and positivists and presenting itself as a more affordable and democratic alternative to the monarchist newspapers Jornal do Recife and Diário de Pernambuco. In addition to his articles, Martins Júnior earned his living by giving private lessons in natural and Roman law before opening a law office with Arthur Orlando. Around this time, he became more involved in the local abolitionist movement, supporting the national anti-slavery campaign led by Joaquim Nabuco and José Mariano.

In 1885, he launched an independent campaign for a seat in the Chamber of Deputies, but lost to conservative rival Gonçalves Ferreira. With the end of A Folha do Norte, he joined the publication Jornal do Recife, where he maintained the column Questões sociaes. On April 10 1886, he founded the Centro Republicano de Pernambuco as the nucleus for the Republican Party of Pernambuco, officially founded in December 1888. Facing financial hardship, he applied for a professorship at his alma mater twice, but failed. Among the examiners were longtime rivals of Martins Júnior, including J. J. Seabra. In his third attempt, he presented a thesis titled O conceito de Cequitas foi sempre o mesmo nos diferentes períodos da história do Direito Romano?, which earned him first place, but Luna Freire Júnior, who had placed third, was appointed to the position. These episodes generated nationwide sympathy for Martins Júnior, with newspapers and intellectuals, including Silvio Romero and Ruy Barbosa, condemning what they saw as a politically motivated injustice.

In 1888, he published the book Dissertações e Teses, containing the three theses he had presented in the professorship examinations. With the abolition of slavery, a political rivalry between the republicans, led by Martins Júnior, and the liberals, led by José Mariano, divided the state of Pernambuco.

== Legacy ==
Decades after his death, his figure was still associated with defiance and rebelliousness. Poetically, he influenced Augusto dos Anjos through his divulging of scientific poetry, and intellectually he influenced Cruz e Sousa, with whom he maintained correspondence for more than a decade. The academic Delmo Montenegro considers him a precursor of modernism in Brazil.

== Bibliography ==
- Braga, Flávia Bruna Ribeiro da Silva (2022). Martins Júnior (1860-1904): Ciência como fé, República como razão - a trajetória de um radical. Recife: PhD thesis, Federal University of Pernambuco.
