= Masaki Murata =

Japanese footballer (born 1999)

Personal information
- Date of birth: 29 August 1999 (age 27)
- Place of birth: Kawasaki, Kanagawa, Japan
- Height: 1.70 m (5 ft 7 in)
- Position: Midfielder

Team information
- Current team: Sumgayit
- Number: 71

Youth career
- Kawasaki Frontale

Senior career*
Years	Team	Apps	(Gls)
2018–2020	VfB Ginsheim	45	(5)
2020–2021	Bayern Alzenau	3	(1)
2021	Ituano	0	(0)
2021–2022	Valmiera	42	(3)
2023–2024	Sumgayit	51	(1)
2024–2025	Vejle	9	(0)
2025–	Sumgayit	29	(0)

International career
2017	Japan U17	1	(0)
- * Club domestic league appearances and goals as of 22 June 2026

Masaki Murata (村田 聖樹, Murata Masaki; born 29 August 1999) is a Japanese professional footballer who plays as a midfielder for Azerbaijan Premier League club Sumgayit FK.

== Club career ==
Murata progressed through Kawasaki Frontale's youth academy before joining German fifth-tier Hessenliga club VfB Ginsheim in 2018 to develop at a higher level.

On 14 January 2023, Sumgayit announced the signing of Murata. On July 6, 2024 Vejle confirmed that Murata joined the Danish Superliga club on a deal until June 2027. On 9 August 2025, Murata returned to Sumgayit after leaving Vejle.

== Honours ==
Valmiera

- Latvian Higher League: 2022
