= Giorgi Papunashvili =

Georgian footballer (born 1995)

Personal information
- Date of birth: 2 September 1995 (age 31)
- Place of birth: Tbilisi, Georgia
- Height: 1.77 m (5 ft 10 in)
- Position: Winger

Team information
- Current team: Zira
- Number: 10

Youth career
- 2004–2012: Dinamo Tbilisi

Senior career*
Years	Team	Apps	(Gls)
2012–2013	Dinamo-2 Tbilisi	5	(0)
2013–2017	Dinamo Tbilisi	64	(26)
2015–2016	→ Werder Bremen II (loan)	20	(2)
2017–2020	Zaragoza	53	(9)
2020	→ Racing Santander (loan)	4	(0)
2021–2022	Apollon Limassol	8	(0)
2022	Torpedo Kutaisi	15	(0)
2022–2023	Radnički Niš	3	(0)
2023	Samtredia	15	(0)
2023	Telavi	1	(0)
2023–2024	Kapaz	19	(5)
2024–	Zira	59	(10)

International career^{‡}
2011–2012	Georgia U17	10	(2)
2013–2014	Georgia U19	5	(3)
2014–2016	Georgia U21	6	(2)
2014–	Georgia	17	(3)
- * Club domestic league appearances and goals as of 22 June 2026 ‡ National team caps and goals as of 1 May 2023

Giorgi Papunashvili (Georgian: გიორგი პაპუნაშვილი, romanized: giorgi p'ap'unashvili, pronounced [ɡioɾɡi pʼapʼunaʃʷili]; born 2 September 1995), commonly known as Papu, is a Georgian professional footballer who plays for Azerbaijani club Zira as a winger.

Ha has played for the Georgian national senior and youth teams.

== Club career ==
=== Dinamo Tbilisi ===
Papunashvili started his career in his hometown club Dinamo Tbilisi. In 2013, after having spent a single season with the reserve side of the Georgian club, Papunashvili was promoted to the first team and in November he made his debut in Erovnuli Liga against Tskhinvali.

During the 2014–15 season, Papunashvili became the key figure at Dinamo, scoring 16 goals in all tournaments with the club, including his first career hat-trick against Tskhinvali in October 2014. Dinamo won Georgian Cup at the end of the season as well, with Papunashvili scoring two goals in the final against Samtredia.

In summer 2015, Papunashvili signed a season-long loan deal with Werder Bremen. He joined the reserve side of the club and played in 3. Liga. The loan spell was unsuccessful, as Papunashvili missed 12 games due to injury and was only able to make 20 appearances for the club, scoring two goals.

=== Real Zaragoza ===
In June 2017, Papunashvili signed four-year deal with Real Zaragoza. He made his debut for the Spanish club against Granada CF on 28 August, replacing Oliver Buff.

On 12 January 2020, Papunashvili joined fellow second division side Racing de Santander on loan until the end of the season.

=== Short spells ===
On 24 December 2020, Zaragoza announced the transfer of Papunashvili to Cypriot club Apollon Limassol FC.

In January 2022, he returned to Erovnuli Liga to join Torpedo Kutaisi. After six months Papunashvili moved to Serbian side Radnički Niš. In March 2023, he signed with Samtredia, and four months later joined Telavi. Having played one league match for the latter, Papunashvili signed a contract with Azerbaijan Premier League side Kapaz. On 3 August 2024, Papunashvili signed 1+1 year contract with Azerbaijan Premier League side Zira.

== International career ==
Papunashvili made his debut for the national team in a 1–0 friendly loss against the United Arab Emirates on 3 June 2014.

He also represented Georgia national under-17 football team in the 2012 UEFA European Under-17 Championship in Slovenia. Papunashvili scored a memorable last-minute goal in a crucial win over England in the qualifying stage of this championship.

== Career statistics ==
=== Club ===
As of 22 January 2025

Appearances and goals by club, season and competition
Club	Season	League			Cup		Continental		Total	
Club	Season	Division	Apps	Goals	Apps	Goals	Apps	Goals	Apps	Goals
Dinamo-2 Tbilisi	2012–13	Pirveli Liga	5	0	—		—		5	0
Dinamo Tbilisi	2013–14	Umaglesi Liga	15	3	3	0	—		18	3
Dinamo Tbilisi	2014–15	Umaglesi Liga	21	14	5	2	—		26	16
Dinamo Tbilisi	2015–16	Umaglesi Liga	—		—		2	1	2	1
Dinamo Tbilisi	2016	Umaglesi Liga	12	3	1	0	6	0	19	3
Dinamo Tbilisi	2017	Umaglesi Liga	16	6	2	0	—		18	6
Dinamo Tbilisi	Total		64	26	11	2	8	1	83	29
Werder Bremen II (loan)	2015–16	3. Liga	20	2	—		—		20	2
Real Zaragoza	2017–18	Segunda División	28	7	3	1	—		31	8
Real Zaragoza	2018–19	Segunda División	13	2	1	1	—		14	3
Real Zaragoza	2019–20	Segunda División	11	0	2	2	—		13	2
Real Zaragoza	2020–21	Segunda División	3	0	—		—		3	0
Real Zaragoza	Total		55	9	6	4	—		61	13
Racing Santander (loan)	2019–20	Segunda División	4	0	—		—		4	0
Apollon Limassol	2020–21	Cypriot First Division	8	0	—		—		8	0
Apollon Limassol	2021–22	Cypriot First Division	1	0	—		1	0	2	0
Apollon Limassol	Total		9	0	—		1	0	10	0
Torpedo Kutaisi	2022	Erovnuli Liga	15	0	—		—		15	0
Radnički Niš	2022–23	Serbian SuperLiga	3	0	—		—		3	0
Samtredia	2023	Erovnuli Liga	15	0	—		—		15	0
Telavi	2023	Erovnuli Liga	1	0	2	0	—		3	0
Kapaz	2023–24	Azerbaijan Premier League	19	5	1	0	—		20	5
Zira	2024–25	Azerbaijan Premier League	13	5	1	0	—		14	5
Career total			223	47	21	6	9	1	253	54

=== International goals ===
Scores and results list Georgia's goal tally first, score column indicates score after each Papunashvili goal.

List of international goals scored by Giorgi Papunashvili
No.	Date	Venue	Opponent	Score	Result	Competition
1	24 March 2018	Mikheil Meskhi Stadium, Tbilisi, Georgia	Lithuania	1–0	4–0	Friendly
2	7 June 2019	Boris Paichadze National Stadium, Tbilissi, Georgia	Gibraltar	2–0	3–0	UEFA Euro 2020 qualification
3	19 November 2019	Stadion Aldo Drosina, Pula, Croatia	Croatia	1–0	1–2	Friendly

== Honours ==
Dinamo Tbilisi

- Umaglesi Liga: 2013–14
- Georgian Cup: 2013–14, 2014–15
- Georgian Super Cup: 2014
