= Henrique (footballer, born 1995) =

Brazilian footballer

Personal information
- Full name: Henrique Gelain Custodio
- Date of birth: 5 January 1995 (age 31)
- Place of birth: Carazinho, Brazil
- Height: 1.80 m (5 ft 11 in)
- Position: Left-back

Team information
- Current team: Zira
- Number: 25

Youth career
- 2014–2015: Coritiba

Senior career*
Years	Team	Apps	(Gls)
2015–2018	Coritiba	10	(0)
2016	→ Náutico (loan)	5	(0)
2016	→ Paraná (loan)	10	(0)
2019–2023	Portimonense	55	(1)
2021–2022	→ Farense (loan)	13	(0)
2022–2023	→ B-SAD (loan)	30	(2)
2023–2025	Leixões	28	(0)
2025–	Zira	24	(0)
- * Club domestic league appearances and goals as of 22 June 2026

Henrique Gelain Custodio (born 5 January 1995), simply known as Henrique, is a Brazilian professional footballer who plays as a left-back for Azerbaijani club Zira.

== Club career ==
Born in Carazinho, Rio Grande do Sul, Henrique graduated from Coritiba's youth setup. On 26 May 2015, he was promoted to the main squad after spending a year with the under-23s.

On 4 June 2015, Henrique made his Série A debut, starting in a 0–2 away loss against Fluminense.
