= Edwin Banguera =

Colombian footballer (born 1996)

Personal information
- Full name: Edwin Fernando Vente Banguera
- Date of birth: 12 August 1996 (age 30)
- Place of birth: Cali, Colombia
- Height: 1.79 m (5 ft 10 in)
- Position: Left-back

Team information
- Current team: İmişli
- Number: 29

Youth career
- 2015–2016: América de Cali
- 2016–2017: Depor Cordoba

Senior career*
Years	Team	Apps	(Gls)
2017–2018	Salgueiros	10	(0)
2018–2020	Gil Vicente	39	(2)
2020–2021	→ Sporting da Covilhã (loan)	5	(0)
2021–2022	Felgueiras	26	(1)
2022–2023	Mafra	19	(0)
2023–2025	Felgueiras	61	(3)
2025–	İmişli	27	(2)
- * Club domestic league appearances and goals as of 22 June 2026

Edwin Fernando Vente Banguera (born 12 August 1996) is a Colombian professional footballer who plays as a left-back for Azerbaijani club İmişli.

== Career ==
Banguera made his professional debut with Gil Vicente in a 3–2 Taça da Liga win over Aves on 3 August 2019.

On 30 July 2021, he signed with Felgueiras.

On 27 June 2022, Banguera was signed by Liga Portugal 2 side Mafra.

On 26 July 2023, he returned to Felgueiras, playing in the Liga 3.
