= Pedro Gomes (footballer, born 2003) =

Portuguese footballer (born 2003)

Personal information
- Full name: Pedro Injai Gomes
- Date of birth: 4 June 2003 (age 23)
- Place of birth: Seixal, Portugal
- Height: 1.85 m (6 ft 1 in)
- Position: Centre-back

Team information
- Current team: Dender EH
- Number: 12

Youth career
- 2014–2017: Amora
- 2017–2020: Sporting CP
- 2021–2022: Boavista

Senior career*
Years	Team	Apps	(Gls)
2022–2025	Boavista	21	(0)
2023	→ Atlético CP (loan)	2	(0)
2023–2024	→ Barreirense (loan)	6	(0)
2025	Kapaz	9	(0)
2026	Valencia Mestalla	1	(0)
2026–	Dender EH	2	(0)
- * Club domestic league appearances and goals as of 20 September 2026

Pedro Injai Gomes (born 4 June 2003) is a Portuguese professional footballer who plays as a centre-back for Challenger Pro League club Dender EH in Belgium.

== Career ==
Born in Seixal and of Bissau-Guinean descent, Gomes played as a youth for Amora, Sporting CP and Boavista. In May 2022, having won the national second division with the under-19 team, he signed his first professional contract of three years; he had previously won a national title with Sporting in 2017–18.

At the start of February 2023, Gomes was loaned to Atlético CP in the Campeonato de Portugal. Seven months later, he was lent to Barreirense for the entire season.

Gomes made his professional debut on 10 August 2024 as the Primeira Liga season began with a 1–0 win away to Casa Pia. In 2024–25, he played 21 games as they were relegated from the Primeira Liga, and one more in the Taça de Portugal; his opportunities were limited following a number of signings in February. On 20 January, in the reverse fixture against Casa Pia, he received a red card for a challenge on Leonardo Lelo only three minutes after coming on as a substitute.

On 5 July 2025, with his Boavista contract having expired, Gomes signed a two-year contract at Kapaz in the Azerbaijan Premier League. On 22 December 2025, his contract with Kapaz was terminated by mutual agreement.

Gomes moved to Spanish club Valencia on 28 January 2026, joining the club's reserve team Valencia Mestalla, competing in Segunda Federación.

On 7 July 2026, Gomes signed for Dender EH in Belgium's second-tier Challenger Pro League. He joined on a two-year deal with the option of a third.
