= Imani Barker =

French footballer (born 2003)

Personal information
- Date of birth: 13 August 2002 (age 24)
- Place of birth: Cayenne, Guyane, France
- Position: Defender

Team information
- Current team: Karvan (on loan from Sumgayit)

Youth career
- Le Havre

Senior career*
Years	Team	Apps	(Gls)
2020–2022	Le Havre II	24	(1)
2021	Le Havre	1	(0)
2022–2023	Clermont II	13	(0)
2023–2024	Le Havre II	15	(0)
2024–2025	Gueugnon	8	(0)
2025–	Sumgayit	0	(0)
2025–	→ Karvan (loan)	23	(2)

International career^{‡}
2026–	Guyana	1	(0)
- * Club domestic league appearances and goals as of 22 June 2026 ‡ National team caps and goals as of 23:00, 1 October 2026 (UTC)

Imani Barker (born 13 August 2003) is a professional football player who plays for Karvan, on loan from Sumgayit. Born in France, he plays for the Guyana national team.

== Club career ==
He made his professional debut for Le Havre on the 15 May 2021, debuting as a right-back, during the Ligue 2 3–2 home win against the league champions of ESTAC Troyes.
