= Ricardo Fernandes (footballer, born 1994) =

Portuguese footballer

Personal information
- Full name: Ricardo José da Silva Fernandes
- Date of birth: 28 October 1994 (age 32)
- Place of birth: Oliveira do Bairro, Portugal
- Height: 1.93 m (6 ft 4 in)
- Position: Goalkeeper

Team information
- Current team: Şamaxı
- Number: 1

Youth career
- 2003–2012: Oliveira Bairro
- 2012–2013: Belenenses

Senior career*
Years	Team	Apps	(Gls)
2012	Oliveira Bairro	0	(0)
2013–2018	Belenenses	1	(0)
2013–2014	→ Torreense (loan)	12	(0)
2014–2015	→ Eléctrico (loan)	27	(0)
2015–2016	→ Oliveirense (loan)	18	(0)
2016	→ Anadia (loan)	9	(0)
2016–2017	→ Fafe (loan)	24	(0)
2018–2019	Famalicão	2	(0)
2019–2021	Académico Viseu	28	(0)
2021–2023	Santa Clara	7	(0)
2023–2024	Torreense	2	(0)
2024–	Şamaxı	72	(0)
- * Club domestic league appearances and goals as of 16:50, 21 September 2026 (UTC)

Ricardo José da Silva Fernandes (born 28 October 1994) is a Portuguese professional footballer who plays as a goalkeeper for Azerbaijan Premier League club Şamaxı.

== Club career ==
Born in Oliveira do Bairro, Aveiro District, Fernandes spent his first three years as a senior in the third division. In July 2016, he signed with Segunda Liga club AD Fafe on loan from C.F. Os Belenenses, making his debut as a professional on 31 July of that month in a 0–1 home loss against F.C. Vizela in the first stage of the Taça da Liga. His maiden league appearance took place on 28 November, when he kept a clean sheet to help the visitors defeat S.L. Benfica B 1–0.

Fernandes returned to the Estádio do Restelo for the 2017–18 season, where he acted as third or fourth choice. He made his Primeira Liga debut on 12 May 2018, coming on as a substitute for Muriel in the last nine minutes of the 1–0 away defeat to Boavista F.C. in the last matchday.

On 22 May 2018, Fernandes dropped into the second tier on a two-year contract at F.C. Famalicão. He was back-up to Rafael Defendi as the team won promotion as runners-up, moving on to Académico de Viseu FC; on his first of three appearances in his debut campaign for the latter on 22 December 2019, he was sent off for a foul on Mohamed Bouldini.

Fernandes took the starting spot from Ricardo Janota in his second season in Viseu. At its conclusion, he signed a three-year deal at top-flight C.D. Santa Clara on 23 June 2021.

On 4 July 2023, Fernandes returned to S.C.U. Torreense after nine years away, with the side now in the second division.
