= Ange Mutsinzi =

Rwandan footballer (born 1997)

Personal information
- Full name: Jimmy Ange Mutsinzi
- Date of birth: 15 November 1997 (age 28)
- Place of birth: Byimana, Rwanda
- Height: 1.92 m (6 ft 4 in)
- Position: Defender

Team information
- Current team: Zira
- Number: 3

Senior career*
Years	Team	Apps	(Gls)
2015–2016	Muhanga		
2016–2019	Rayon Sports		
2019–2021	APR	37	(6)
2021–2023	Trofense	30	(1)
2023–2024	Jerv	42	(3)
2024–	Zira	60	(0)

International career^{‡}
2018–	Rwanda	30	(1)
- * Club domestic league appearances and goals as of 22 June 2026 ‡ National team caps and goals as of 18 November 2024

Ange Mutsinzi (born 15 November 1997) is a Rwandan football defender who plays for Azerbaijan Premier League club Zira FK.

== Club career ==
On 6 September 2021, he signed with Portuguese club Trofense.

On 7 February 2023, Mutsinzi signed a two-year contract with Jerv in Norway.

== International career ==
He was a squad member of Rwanda for the 2020 African Nations Championship.
