= Iron Gomis =

French footballer (born 1999)

Personal information
- Full name: Iron David Bocaf Gomis
- Date of birth: 9 November 1999 (age 27)
- Place of birth: Marseille, France
- Height: 1.82 m (6 ft 0 in)
- Position: Midfielder

Team information
- Current team: Troyes

Senior career*
Years	Team	Apps	(Gls)
2018–2023	Amiens II	32	(1)
2019–2023	Amiens	89	(5)
2019–2020	→ Dunkerque (loan)	22	(0)
2022	→ Dunkerque (loan)	10	(1)
2023–2024	Kasımpaşa	21	(1)
2024	→ Salernitana (loan)	5	(0)
2024–2026	Zira	53	(2)
2026–	Troyes	0	(0)
- * Club domestic league appearances and goals as of 1 June 2026

Iron David Bocaf Gomis (born 9 November 1999) is a French professional footballer who plays as a midfielder for Ligue 1 club Troyes.

== Career ==
On 9 March 2019, Gomis signed his first professional contract with Amiens. He made his professional debut with Amiens in a 1–0 Ligue 2 win over Nancy on 22 August 2020.

On 31 January 2022, Gomis returned to Dunkerque on another loan.

On 15 July 2023, he signed with Süper Lig club Kasımpaşa.

On 1 February 2024, Gomis joined Salernitana in Italy on loan.

On 2 September 2024, his contract with Kasımpaşa was mutually terminated, and he became a free agent. On the next day, he signed a two-year contract with the Azerbaijan Premier League club Zira FK.

On 16 July 2026, Gomis returned to France and signed a two-year deal with Troyes in Ligue 1.

== Personal life ==
Gomis was born in France and is of Senegalese descent through his father.
