= Brahim Konaté =

French footballer (born 1996)

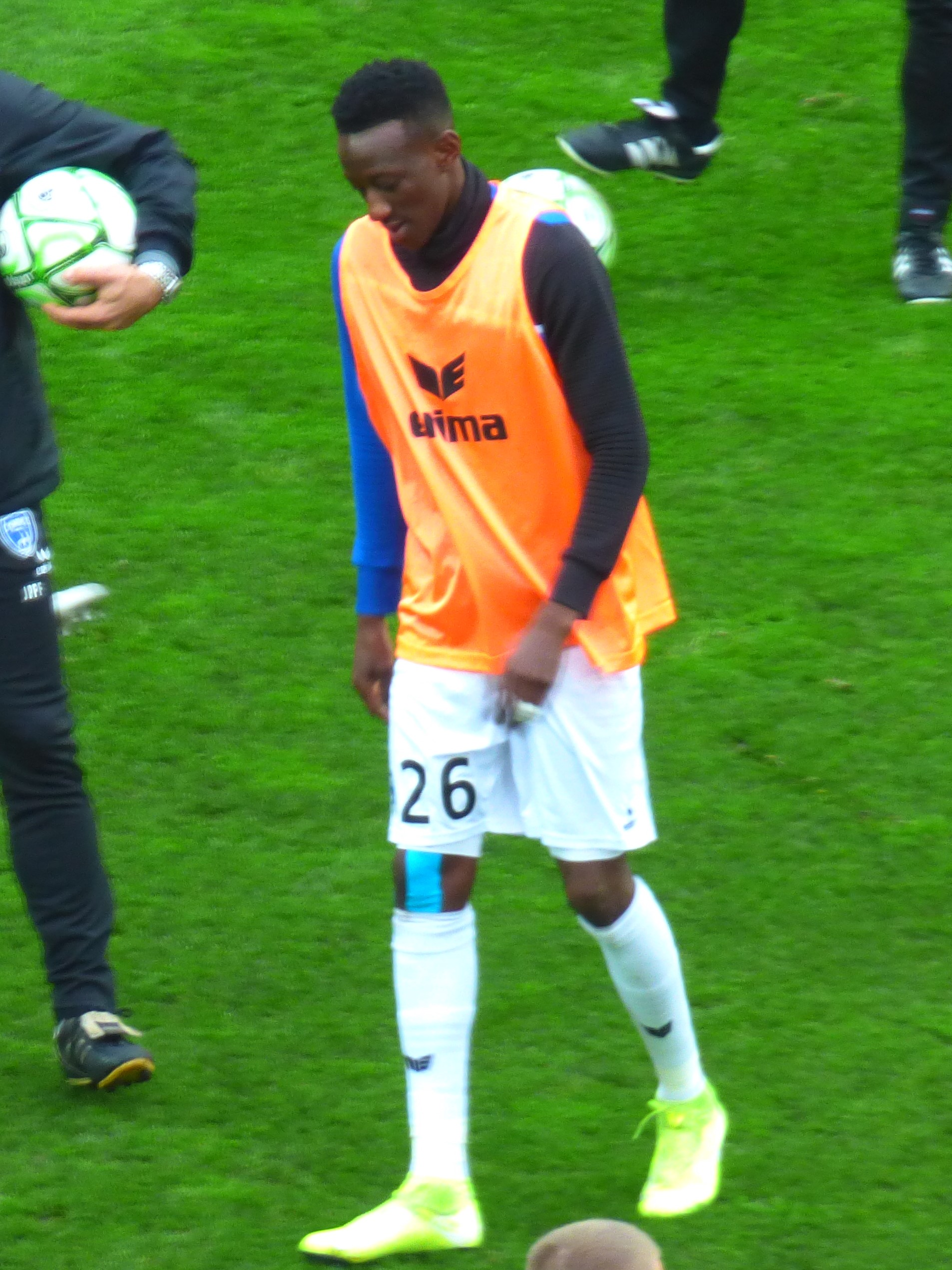
- Brahim Konaté in 2019

Personal information
- Date of birth: 20 March 1996 (age 30)
- Place of birth: Montfermeil, France
- Height: 1.79 m (5 ft 10 in)
- Position: Midfielder

Team information
- Current team: Zira
- Number: 93

Youth career
- 2004–2011: Livry Gargan
- 2011–2013: Auxerre

Senior career*
Years	Team	Apps	(Gls)
2013–2015	Auxerre B	37	(1)
2015–2018	Auxerre	64	(2)
2018–2020	Chamois Niortais B	4	(0)
2018–2021	Chamois Niortais	40	(3)
2021–2022	Fuenlabrada	18	(2)
2022	CF Rayo Majadahonda	7	(0)
2023	Kauno Žalgiris	21	(2)
2023	Hapoel Afula	12	(1)
2024–2025	Shamakhi	29	(8)
2025–	Zira	24	(3)

International career
2016	France U20	6	(0)
- * Club domestic league appearances and goals as of 22 June 2026

Brahim Konaté (born 20 March 1996) is a French footballer who plays as a central midfielder or attacking midfielder for Zira in the Azerbaijan Premier League.

== Personal life ==
Brahim Konaté was born in Montfermeil, in the northeastern suburbs of Paris. He holds French and Malian nationalities.

== Club career ==
An AJ Auxerre youth graduate, Konaté played for two seasons as a senior with the reserves before making his first team debut on 18 September 2015, starting in a 1–0 Ligue 2 home win over Chamois Niortais.

Konaté scored his first professional goal on 6 November 2015, but in a 1–2 home loss against RC Lens. In 2018, he moved to fellow second division side Niort.

On 31 August 2021, free agent Konaté moved abroad and signed a one-year contract with Spanish Segunda División side CF Fuenlabrada.

=== FK Kauno Žalgiris ===
On 14 February 2023 was announced that player signed with Lithuanian club Kauno Žalgiris.

On 10 August 2023 signed for Hapoel Afula.

=== Shamakhi FK ===
On 26 May 2025, Konaté did not extend his expiring contract with Shamakhi and left the club.

== International career ==
Konaté is a youth international with the France U20s.
