= 2025–26 Neftçi PFK season =

Neftçi
2025–26 season
- Manager: Samir Abasov (until 24 November); Sanan Gurbanov (Acting) (24 November - 9 December); Yuriy Vernydub (from 9 December)
- Stadium: Neftçi Arena
- Premier League: 4th
- Azerbaijan Cup: Last 16
- Top goalscorer: League: Bassala Sambou (11); Emin Mahmudov (11); All: Bassala Sambou (11); Emin Mahmudov (11)
- Highest home attendance: 9,500 vs Qarabağ (26 April 2026)
- Lowest home attendance: 1,000 vs Gabala (10 February 2026)
- Average home league attendance: 2,793 (10 May 2026)

The 2025–26 was Neftçi's 34th Azerbaijan Premier League season. Aside from the Premier League, Neftçi will also participate in the Azerbaijan Cup.

== Season overview ==
On 5 June, Neftçi announced the signing of Sessi D'Almeida from Apollon Limassol to a two-year contract with the option of an additional year.

On 27 June, Neftçi announced the season-long loan signing of Luis Ortíz from Sportivo Ameliano.

On 28 June, Neftçi announced the signing of Elvin Badalov and Murad Khachayev from Sumgayit, both on two-year contracts.

On 2 July, Neftçi announced the signing of Igor Ribeiro to a two-year contract from Araz-Naxçıvan, with the Brazilian defender joining on 1 August after Araz-Naxçıvan's games in Europe had been concluded.

On 5 July, Neftçi announced the signing of Imad Faraj from AEK Larnaca to a three-year contract, and the signing of Kenan Pirić from Antalyaspor to a two-year contract.

On 15 July, Neftçi announced the season-long loan signing of Freddy Vargas from Maccabi Netanya, and the singing of Jordan Rezabala from Dorados to a two-year contract.

On 22 July, Neftçi announced the signing of Cristian Costin from Dinamo București to a one-year contract with the option of an additional year.

On 30 July, Neftçi announced the signing of Alessio Curci from Francs Borains to a three-year contract.

On 10 August, Neftçi announced the signing of Falaye Sacko from Montpellier to a two-year contract with the option of an additional year.

On 10 September, Neftçi announced that Ramil Sheydayev had left the club after his contract was terminated by mutual consent.

On 26 September, Neftçi announced the signing of free-agent Ifeanyi Mathew to a one-year contract with the option of an additional year.

On 21 October, Neftçi announced the signing of free-agent Vincent Aboubakar to a one-year contract with the option of an additional year.

On 24 November, Neftçi announced the departure of Samir Abasov as head coach after he was sacked following a run of results deemed unsatisfactory by the board, with Sanan Gurbanov being put in temporary charge.

On 9 December, Neftçi announced the appointment of Yuriy Vernydub as their new head coach, on a contract until the summer of 2027.

On 27 January, Neftçi announced that they had extended their contract with Rza Jafarov until the summer of 2028, and that Jafarov had also joined Gabala on loan for the remainder of the season.

On 10 February, Neftçi announced the signing of Breno Almeida from Ethnikos Achna, on a contract until the summer of 2028.

On 26 May, Neftçi announced that Murad Mammadov would be leaving the club to sign for Pafos, and that Cristian Costin, Edvin Kuč abnd Vincent Aboubakar would also be leaving the club after their contracts had expired.

== Squad ==
As of match played 23 May 2026

No.	Name	Nationality	Position	Date of birth (age)	Signed from	Signed in	Contract ends	Apps.	Goals
Goalkeepers
1	Emil Balayev	(Azerbaijan)	GK	17 April 1994 (age 32)	Sabail	2023	2025	25	0
13	Kenan Pirić	(Bosnia and Herzegovina)	GK	7 July 1994 (age 32)	Antalyaspor	2025	2027	29	0
81	Mahdi Hasanov	(Azerbaijan)	GK	23 July 2008 (age 18)	Academy	2025		0	0
Defenders
5	Igor Ribeiro	(Brazil)	DF	4 October 1996 (age 30)	Araz-Naxçıvan	2025	2027	31	1
15	Elvin Badalov	(Azerbaijan)	DF	14 June 1995 (age 31)	Sumgayit	2025	2027	90	2
17	Murad Khachayev	(Azerbaijan)	DF	14 April 1998 (age 28)	Sumgayit	2025	2027	17	0
24	Moustapha Seck	(Senegal)	DF	23 February 1996 (age 30)	Portimonense	2024	2027	63	0
27	Cristian Costin	(Romania)	DF	17 June 1998 (age 28)	Dinamo București	2025	2026(+1)	7	0
36	Hasan Mahmudov	(Azerbaijan)	DF	3 October 2007 (age 19)	Academy	2025		0	0
77	Falaye Sacko	(Senegal)	DF	1 May 1995 (age 31)	Montpellier	2025	2027(+1)	28	0
Midfielders
4	Elvin Camalov	(Azerbaijan)	MF	4 February 1995 (age 31)	Sabah	2025	2026 (+1)	28	1
6	Sessi D'Almeida	(Benin)	MF	20 November 1995 (age 30)	Apollon Limassol	2025	2027(+1)	23	1
7	Emil Safarov	(Azerbaijan)	MF	30 October 2002 (age 23)	Gabala	2024	2027	46	4
8	Emin Mahmudov	(Azerbaijan)	MF	27 April 1992 (age 34)	Boavista	2017	2025	288	72
14	Edvin Kuč	(Montenegro)	MF	27 October 1993 (age 32)	Ballkani	2024	2026	42	1
18	Ifeanyi Mathew	(Nigeria)	MF	20 January 1997 (age 29)	Unattached	2025	2026(+1)	28	3
22	Luis Ortíz	(Paraguay)	MF	30 January 2000 (age 26)	on loan from Sportivo Ameliano	2025	2026	26	0
23	Jordan Rezabala	(Ecuador)	MF	29 February 2000 (age 26)	Dorados de Sinaloa	2025	2027	26	0
47	Murad Mammadov	(Azerbaijan)	MF	26 April 2006 (age 20)	Academy	2024		41	3
70	Andriy Shtohrin	(Ukraine)	MF	14 December 1998 (age 27)	Chornomorets Odesa	2024	2027	42	4
Forwards
9	Bassala Sambou	(Germany)	FW	15 October 1997 (age 28)	Enosis Neon Paralimni	2025	2026	43	15
10	Freddy Vargas	(Venezuela)	FW	1 April 1999 (age 27)	on loan from Maccabi Netanya	2025	2026	34	5
11	Imad Faraj	(France)	FW	11 February 1999 (age 27)	AEK Larnaca	2025	2028	32	7
19	Agadadash Salyanski	(Azerbaijan)	FW	19 June 2004 (age 22)	Academy	2022		50	7
28	Alessio Curci	(Luxembourg)	FW	16 February 2002 (age 24)	Francs Borains	2025	2028	19	2
33	Breno Almeida	(Brazil)	FW	29 July 1998 (age 28)	Ethnikos Achna	2026	2028	12	3
45	Vincent Aboubakar	(Cameroon)	FW	22 January 1992 (age 34)	Unattached	2025	2026 (+1)	18	9
Also under contract
Away on loan
93	Rza Jafarov	(Azerbaijan)	GK	3 July 2003 (age 23)	Academy	2022	2028	63	0
	Ryonosuke Ohori	(Japan)	MF	10 January 2001 (age 25)	TransINVEST	2025	2025(+2)	11	0
Left during the season
90	Ramil Sheydayev	(Azerbaijan)	FW	15 March 1996 (age 30)	Kocaelispor	2024	2027	31	4
	Alex Fernandes	(Brazil)	FW	3 June 2002 (age 24)	on loan from Baltika Kaliningrad	2025	2025	16	1

== Transfers ==
=== In ===
Date	Position	Nationality	Name	From	Fee	Ref.
5 June 2025	MF	(Benin)	Sessi D'Almeida	Apollon Limassol	Undisclosed	
28 June 2025	DF	(Azerbaijan)	Elvin Badalov	Sumgayit	Undisclosed	
28 June 2025	DF	(Azerbaijan)	Murad Khachayev	Sumgayit	Undisclosed	
2 July 2025 (Note: Transfer announced on the shown date, becoming official on 1 August 2025.)	DF	(Brazil)	Igor Ribeiro	Araz-Naxçıvan	Undisclosed	
5 July 2025	FW	(France)	Imad Faraj	AEK Larnaca	Undisclosed	
15 July 2025	MF	(Ecuador)	Jordan Rezabala	Dorados	Undisclosed	
22 July 2025	DF	(Romania)	Cristian Costin	Dinamo București	Undisclosed	
26 July 2025	GK	(Bosnia and Herzegovina)	Kenan Pirić	Antalyaspor	Undisclosed	
30 July 2025	FW	(Luxembourg)	Alessio Curci	Francs Borains	Undisclosed	
10 August 2025	DF	(Mali)	Falaye Sacko	Montpellier	Undisclosed	
26 September 2025	MF	(Nigeria)	Ifeanyi Mathew	Unattached	Free	
21 October 2025	FW	(Cameroon)	Vincent Aboubakar	Unattached	Free	
10 February 2026	FW	(Brazil)	Breno Almeida	Ethnikos Achna	Undisclosed	

=== Loans in ===
Date from	Position	Nationality	Name	From	Date to	Ref.
27 June 2025	MF	(Paraguay)	Luis Ortíz	Sportivo Ameliano	End of season	
15 July 2025	FW	(Venezuela)	Freddy Vargas	Maccabi Netanya	End of season	

=== Loans out ===
Date from	Position	Nationality	Name	To	Date to	Ref.
30 August 2025	MF	(Japan)	Ryonosuke Ohori	Kapaz	End of season	
27 January 2026	GK	(Azerbaijan)	Rza Jafarov	Gabala	End of season	

=== Released ===
Date	Position	Nationality	Name	Joined	Date	Ref
4 June 2025	DF	(Germany)	Robert Bauer	Buriram United		
4 June 2025	MF	(Portugal)	Raphael Guzzo	Marítimo		
16 June 2025	FW	(The Gambia)	Dembo Darboe	Al Ahli	7 September 2025	
24 June 2025	DF	(Ivory Coast)	Erwin Koffi	Guingamp	24 June 2025	
24 June 2025	MF	(Azerbaijan)	Filip Ozobić	Turan Tovuz	26 July 2025	
14 July 2025	MF	(Azerbaijan)	İsmayıl Zülfüqarlı	Shafa Baku		
25 July 2025	MF	(Sierra Leone)	Alpha Conteh	Stjarnan	13 August 2025	
10 September 2025	FW	(Azerbaijan)	Ramil Sheydayev	Qarabağ	18 September 2025	
26 May 2026	DF	(Romania)	Cristian Costin			
26 May 2026	MF	(Montenegro)	Edvin Kuč	Ballkani		
26 May 2026	FW	(Cameroon)	Vincent Aboubakar			

== Friendlies ==
9 January 2026	Neftçi	3–0	Kairat	Abu Dhabi, United Arab Emirates
17:00 AZT (UTC+4)	Salyanski 67'; Aboubakar 89'; Mammadov 90+2'	Report		Stadium: 321 Sports Club stadium

13 January 2026	Neftçi	1–1	Pyramids	Abu Dhabi, United Arab Emirates
18:00 AZT (UTC+4)	Mammadov 87'	Report	Ewerton 16'	Stadium: Mohammed bin Zayed Stadium

16 January 2026	Neftçi	3–1	Chengdu Rongcheng	Abu Dhabi, United Arab Emirates
AZT (UTC+4)	Shtohrin 9'; Sambou 29'; Ribeiro 53'	Report	80'	Stadium: ERTH Abu Dhabi stadium

== Competitions ==
=== Overview ===
Competition	First match	Last match	Starting round	Final position	Record							
Competition	First match	Last match	Starting round	Final position	Pld	W	D	L	GF	GA	GD	Win %
Premier League	16 August 2025	23 May 2026	Matchday 1	4th	33	16	11	6	57	32	+25	48.48
Azerbaijan Cup	29 October 2025	2 December 2025	Last 16	Quarter-final	2	1	0	1	6	3	+3	50.00
Total					35	17	11	7	63	35	+28	48.57

Last updated: 23 May 2026
Source: Competitions

=== Premier League ===
==== League table ====
Pos	Team	Pld	W	D	L	GF	GA	GD	Pts	Qualification or relegation
2	Qarabağ	33	21	6	6	71	27	+44	69	Qualification for the Europa League first qualifying round (Note: The 2025–26 Azerbaijan Cup winner (Sabah) qualified for the Europa League first qualifying round. Since Sabah also won the league, the berth was passed to the second place team and the Conference League berths go to the third and fourth placed teams.)
3	Turan Tovuz (Note: UEFA removed Turan Tovuz for a past match-fixing case.)	33	17	8	8	44	27	+17	59 (Note: Matches won: Turan-Tovuz 17, Neftçi 16.)	
4	Neftçi	33	16	11	6	57	32	+25	59	Qualification for the Conference League second qualifying round
5	Zira	33	13	14	6	43	36	+7	53	Qualification for the Conference League first qualifying round
6	Araz-Naxçıvan	33	13	7	13	44	58	−14	46	

Source: Soccerway
Rules for classification: 1) Points; 2) Matches won; 3) Goal difference; 4) Goals scored; 5) Head-to-head points; 6) Head-to-head goal difference; 7) Lower number of points based on yellow and red cards; 8) Draw.

==== Results summary ====
Overall								Home						Away					
Pld	W	D	L	GF	GA	GD	Pts	W	D	L	GF	GA	GD	W	D	L	GF	GA	GD
33	16	11	6	57	33	+24	59	6	6	4	27	18	+9	10	5	2	30	15	+15

Last updated: 23 May 2026.
Source: See Results

==== Results by round ====
Round	1	2	3	4	5	6	7	8	9	10	11	12	13	14	15	16	17	18	19	20	22	23	24	25	26	27	28	29	21	30	31	32	33
Ground	H	A	H	H	A	H	A	H	A	H	A	H	A	A	H	A	H	A	H	A	A	H	A	H	A	H	A	H	H	A	H	A	A
Result	D	D	L	D	W	D	D	D	W	W	L	L	D	L	D	W	D	W	W	W	D	L	W	W	W	W	D	L	W	W	W	W	W
Position	6	7	10	10	8	8	8	8	7	6	7	7	7	9	9	7	7	7	6	5	6	6	6	6	5	5	5	5	4	4	4	4	

Updated to match(es) played on 23 May 2026. Source: See Results
A = Away; H = Home; W = Win; D = Draw; L = Loss

==== Results ====
16 August 2025 1	Neftçi	1–1	Şamaxı	Baku
20:00 AZT (UTC+4)	Costin (yellow card) 22'; Mahmudov 45+2' (pen.)	Report	Apolinario (yellow card) 19'; Rossi 23'	Stadium: Neftçi Arena; Attendance: 2,700; Referee: Elçin Məsiyev

22 August 2025 2	İmişli	0–0	Neftçi	Shamakhi
17:00 AZT (UTC+4)	Juninho (yellow card) 42'; Apolinario (yellow card) 89'	Report	Rezabala (yellow card) 45+2'; Safarov (yellow card) 90+5'	Stadium: City Stadium; Attendance: 700; Referee: Rauf Cabarov

29 August 2025 3	Neftçi	0–1	Turan Tovuz	Baku
20:30 AZT (UTC+4)	Ribeiro (red card) 55'; Seck (yellow card) 60'	Report	Olabe 6'; Miller (yellow card) 58'; Baklov (yellow card) 90+4'	Stadium: Neftçi Arena; Attendance: 2,084; Referee: Aliyar Aghayev

14 September 2025 4	Neftçi	0–0	Sabah	Baku
19:00 AZT (UTC+4)		Report	Santos (yellow card) 37'; Mickels (yellow card) 49'; Puchacz (yellow card) 50'	Stadium: Neftçi Arena; Attendance: 1,300; Referee: İnqilab Məmmədov

21 September 2025 5	Sumgayit	0–2	Neftçi	Sumgait
19:30 AZT (UTC+4)	Abdullazade (yellow card) 52'; Vásquez (yellow card) 65'; Akhmedzade (yellow card) 81'	Report	D'Almeida (yellow card) 29'; Salyanski 79'; Vargas (yellow card) 90'; Curci 90+2'	Stadium: City Stadium; Attendance: 3,500; Referee: Elçin Məsiyev

27 September 2025 6	Neftçi	0–0	Karvan	Baku
19:00 AZT (UTC+4)	Faraj (yellow card) 90+5'; Kuč (yellow card) 90+7'; Mahmudov (yellow card) FT	Report	İbrahimov (yellow card) 87'; Irankhah (yellow card) 90+5'	Stadium: Neftçi Arena; Attendance: 1,200; Referee: Kamranbəy Rəhimov

3 October 2025 7	Zira	2–2	Neftçi	Zirə
19:30 AZT (UTC+4)	Papunashvili 28'; Gomis (yellow card) 46' (yellow-red card) 90+7'; Silva (yellow card) 87'; Nuriyev (yellow card) 90+2'} Renato 90+5' (pen.)	Report	D'Almeida (yellow card) 39'; Vargas 66'; Safarov (yellow card) 72'; Sambou 88'; Badalov (yellow card) 90+4'	Stadium: Zira Olympic Sport Complex Stadium; Attendance: 1,200; Referee: Kamal Umudlu

19 October 2025 8	Neftçi	2–2	Araz-Naxçıvan	Baku
18:30 AZT (UTC+4)	Sambou 19'; Ribeiro (yellow card) 28'; D'Almeida (yellow card) 33'; Vargas (yellow card) 62'; Ortíz (yellow card) 78'	Report	Santos (yellow card) 28'; Simakala 36', 47'	Stadium: Neftçi Arena; Attendance: 2,800; Referee: Fərid Hacıyev

26 October 2025 9	Gabala	0–2	Neftçi	Qabala
16:00 AZT (UTC+4)		Report	Kuč (yellow card) 40'; Camalov (yellow card) 42'; Mathew 72'; Aboubakar 81'	Stadium: City Stadium; Attendance: 600; Referee: Aliyar Aghayev

1 November 2025 10	Neftçi	5–1	Kapaz	Baku
17:00 AZT (UTC+4)	Mahmudov 18' (pen.) (yellow card) 53'; Aboubakar 23'; Ribeiro (yellow card) 67'; Sambou 74', 87'; Vargas 90+1'	Report	Verdasca (yellow card) 35'; Seyidov (yellow card) 40'; Samadov (yellow card) 65'; Şəfiyev 78'; Onanuga (yellow card) 90+2'; Hüseynli (yellow card) FT	Stadium: Neftçi Arena; Attendance: 2,300; Referee: Rəvan Həmzəzadə

9 November 2025 11	Qarabağ	2–0	Neftçi	Baku
18:44 (UTC+4)	Bayramov 50' (pen.); Bolt (yellow card) 75'; Durán 84'	Report	Sacko (yellow card) 59'	Stadium: Azersun Arena; Attendance: 4,677; Referee: Elçin Məsiyev

23 November 2025 12	Neftçi	2–3	İmişli	Baku
17:30 AZT (UTC+4)	Aboubakar 11' (pen.); Badalov (yellow card) 32'; Mahmudov 60'	Report	Morgan 13'; Moses (yellow card) 45'; Ronaldo (yellow card) 55'; Rollo 64'; Salahlı (yellow card) 65'; Banguera 88'	Stadium: Neftçi Arena; Attendance: 1,300; Referee: Cavid Cəlilov

28 November 2025 13	Turan Tovuz	0–0	Neftçi	Tovuz
18:30 AZT (UTC+4)	Henrique (yellow card) 16'	Report		Stadium: City Stadium; Attendance: 4,500; Referee: Farid Hajiyev

8 December 2025 14	Sabah	2–0	Neftçi	Masazir
20:00 AZT (UTC+4)	Zedadka 58'; Mickels 77'	Report	Seck (yellow card) 79'; Rezabala (yellow card) 85'	Stadium: Bank Respublika Arena; Attendance: 3,500; Referee: Rəvan Həmzəzadə

15 December 2025 15	Neftçi	2–2	Sumgayit	Baku
19:00 AZT (UTC+4)	Badalov (yellow card) 28'; Faraj 35'; Sambou 50'; Vargas (yellow card) 90'	Report	Rustamli (yellow card) 32'; Abdullazade (yellow card) 34' (goal) 82'; Senhadji (yellow card) 48'; Simon 74'; Ninković (yellow card) 90'; Feyzullayev (yellow card) 90+5'	Stadium: Neftçi Arena; Attendance: 1,164; Referee: Rauf Cabarov

20 December 2025 16	Karvan	1–2	Neftçi	Yevlakh
14:00 AZT (UTC+4)	Doyeni (yellow card) 34'; Abdullayev 45+8' (pen.) (yellow card) 61'; Ngwisani (yellow card) 62'; Barker (yellow card) 71'; Abdullayev (yellow card) 82'	Report	Ribeiro (yellow card) 45+8'; Sambou (yellow card) 47' (goal) 61'; Seck (yellow card) 70'; Mahmudov 90+7' (pen.)	Stadium: City Stadium; Attendance: 4,000; Referee: Əliyar Ağayev

23 January 2026 17	Neftçi	0–0	Zira	Baku
19:00 AZT (UTC+4)		Report		Stadium: Neftçi Arena; Attendance: 1,745; Referee: Fərid Hacıyev

1 February 2026 18	Araz-Naxçıvan	0–4	Neftçi	Baku
16:00 AZT (UTC+4)	Franco (yellow card) 12'	Report	Ribeiro 4' (yellow card) 71'; Vargas (yellow card) 15'; Sambou 40'; Curci 84'; Aboubakar 90+2'	Stadium: Dalga Arena; Attendance: 500; Referee: Rauf Cabarov

10 February 2026 19	Neftçi	1–0	Gabala	Baku
19:00 AZT (UTC+4)	Mahmudov 12'; Sambou (yellow card) 50'; Shtohrin (yellow card) 53'; Badalov (yellow card) 78' (yellow-red card) 90+1'; Pirić (yellow card) 83'	Report		Stadium: Neftçi Arena; Attendance: 1,000; Referee: Əliyar Ağayev

15 February 2026 20	Kapaz	1–3	Neftçi	Yevlakh
14:30 AZT (UTC+4)	Hüseynli 35' (pen.); Isayev (red card) 71'	Report	Sambou 27', 38'; Mahmudov 40'; Camalov (yellow card) 74'	Stadium: City Stadium; Attendance: 700; Referee: Əli Əliyev

28 February 2026 22	Şamaxı	2–2	Neftçi	Shamakhi
14:30 AZT (UTC+4)	Cézar 75'; Rossi (yellow card) 83' (goal) 90+4' (pen.)	Report	Ribeiro (yellow card) 46'; Aboubakar 60', 90+3'; Shtohrin (yellow card) 73'; Seck (yellow card) 90+4'; Mathew (yellow card) FT	Stadium: City Stadium; Attendance: 1,200; Referee: Kamranbəy Rəhimov

9 March 2026 23	Neftçi	0–1	Turan Tovuz	Baku
20:30 AZT (UTC+4)	Mathew (yellow card) 34'	Report	Ozobić (yellow card) 47'; Jô 56'; Silva (yellow card) 90+4'	Stadium: Neftçi Arena; Attendance: 4,200; Referee: Əliyar Ağayev

15 March 2026 24	Gabala	3–1	Neftçi	Qabala
18:00 AZT (UTC+4)	Keita 20' (pen.); Rashidov (yellow card) 36'; Ahmadov (yellow card) 81'	Report	Badalov (yellow card) 16'; Sambou 22'; Mahmudov 69' (pen.); Mammadov 77'	Stadium: City Stadium; Attendance: 370; Referee: Elçin Məsiyev

20 March 2026 25	Neftçi	6–0	İmişli	Baku
19:15 AZT (UTC+4)	Almeida 12'; Faraj 15', 51'; Safarov 19', 60'; Mahmudov 55'	Report	Juninho (yellow card) 44'	Stadium: Neftçi Arena; Attendance: 1,300; Referee: Tural Qurbanov

5 April 2026 26	Sumgayit	1–3	Neftçi	Sumgait
18:00 AZT (UTC+4)	Muradly (yellow card) 34'; Ninković 53'	Report	Vargas 36' (pen.); Mathew 65'; Aboubakar 89'	Stadium: City Stadium; Attendance: 1,950; Referee: Kamal Umudlu

11 April 2026 27	Neftçi	2–1	Araz-Naxçıvan	Baku
20:00 AZT (UTC+4)	Faraj 32'; Almeida 57'	Report	Andrade (yellow card) 20'; Alxasov 65'; Cohen (yellow card) 81'; Buludov (yellow card) 90'	Stadium: Neftçi Arena; Attendance: 2,200; Referee: Əli Əliyev

17 April 2026 28	Zira	1–1	Neftçi	Zirə
19:30 AZT (UTC+4)	Djibrilla (yellow card) 50'; Mickels (yellow card) 86'; Konaté 90+4' (yellow card) 90+5'; Júnior (yellow card) 90+5'	Report	Faraj (yellow card) 45' (goal) 64'; Badalov (yellow card) 88'; Balayev (yellow card) 90+5'; Almeida (red card) 90+5'	Stadium: Zira Olympic Sport Complex Stadium; Attendance: 1,200; Referee: İnqilab Məmmədov

26 April 2026 29	Neftçi	1–5	Qarabağ	Baku
19:00 AZT (UTC+4)	Badalov 20'; Ortíz (yellow card) 60'; Rezabala (yellow card) 83'	Report	Qurbanlı 9', 32'; Silva (yellow card) 14'; Montiel 38'; Andrade 68'; Addai 90+3'	Stadium: Neftçi Arena; Attendance: 9,500; Referee: Tural Qurbanov

30 April 2026 21	Neftçi	2–1	Qarabağ	Baku
20:00 (UTC+4)	D'Almeida (yellow card) 24'; Safarov (yellow card) 39' (goal) 55'; Vargas (yellow card) 74'; Balayev (yellow card) 90'; Sambou 90+2' (yellow card) 90+2'	Report	Montiel (yellow card) 41'; Badalov 86' (o.g.); Kady (yellow card) 90+1'; Durán (yellow card) 90+4'	Stadium: Neftçi Arena; Attendance: 7,800; Referee: Kamranbəy Rəhimov
Note: Match originally scheduled for 21 February 2026.

5 May 2026 30	Karvan	0–3	Neftçi	Yevlakh
16:00 AZT (UTC+4)	Turabov (yellow card) 78'	Report	Ortíz (yellow card) 4'; Imad Faraj 31' (yellow card) 81'; Mahmudov 49' (pen.); Vargas 56'	Stadium: City Stadium; Attendance: 2,200; Referee: Rauf Cabarov

10 May 2026 31	Neftçi	3–0	Şamaxı	Baku
19:30 AZT (UTC+4)	Mahmudov 1'; Ortíz (yellow card) 10'; Faraj 47'; Almeida 83'	Report	Agjabayov (yellow card) 20'; Mammadov (yellow card) 41'; Rossi (yellow card) 64'; Ro.Fernandes (yellow card) 90+1'	Stadium: Neftçi Arena; Attendance: 2,100; Referee: Tural Qurbanov

17 May 2026 32	Sabah	1–2	Neftçi	Masazir
18:00 AZT (UTC+4)	Isayev 3'; Mickels (red card) 85'	Report	Shtohrin 10'; Safarov (yellow card) 45' (yellow-red card) 85'; Mathew 70'	Stadium: Bank Respublika Arena; Attendance: 3,300; Referee: Kamal Umudlu

23 May 2026 33	Kapaz	0–1	Neftçi	Yevlakh
17:00 AZT (UTC+4)	Seyidov (yellow card) 20'; Hüseynli (yellow card) 60'; Abuladze (yellow card) 80'; Ismayilov (yellow card) 90+4'	Report	Ribeiro (yellow card) 42'; Vargas 54'; Mathew (red card) 65'; Khachayev (yellow card) 85'; Salyanski (yellow card) 90+3'	Stadium: City Stadium; Attendance: 500; Referee: Vüqar Həsənli

=== Azerbaijan Cup ===
29 October 2025 Second round	Neftçi	6–2	MOIK Baku	Baku
19:00 AZT (UTC+4)	Aboubakar 8', 42'; Qurbanly 27' (o.g.); Mammadov (yellow card) 30' (goal) 70'; Salyanski 62'; D'Almeida 83'; Kuč (yellow card) 86'	Report	Məhərrəmli (yellow card) 16'; E.Mammadov 45+2'; Camalov 48' (o.g.)	Stadium: Neftçi Arena; Attendance: 500; Referee: Vüqar Həsənli

2 December 2025 Last 16	Zira	1–0	Neftçi	Zirə
19:00 AZT (UTC+4)	Gomis (yellow card) 109'; Júnior 116' (yellow card) 117'	Report	Sambou (yellow card) 36'; D'Almeida (yellow card) 47'; Ribeiro (yellow card) 98'	Stadium: Zira Olympic Sport Complex Stadium; Attendance: 1,000; Referee: Tural Qurbanov

== Squad statistics ==
As of match played 23 May 2026

=== Appearances and goals ===
No.	Pos	Nat	Player	Total		Premier League		Azerbaijan Cup	
No.	Pos	Nat	Player	Apps	Goals	Apps	Goals	Apps	Goals
1	GK	(Azerbaijan) AZE	Emil Balayev	7	0	5+1	0	1	0
4	MF	(Azerbaijan) AZE	Elvin Camalov	12	0	4+7	0	0+1	0
5	DF	(Brazil) BRA	Igor Ribeiro	31	1	29	1	2	0
6	MF	(Benin) BEN	Sessi D'Almeida	23	1	15+6	0	2	1
7	MF	(Azerbaijan) AZE	Emil Safarov	21	3	13+7	3	1	0
8	MF	(Azerbaijan) AZE	Emin Mahmudov	34	10	28+4	10	1+1	0
9	FW	(Germany) GER	Bassala Sambou	30	11	20+8	11	1+1	0
10	FW	(Venezuela) VEN	Freddy Vargas	33	5	26+5	5	0+2	0
11	FW	(France) FRA	Imad Faraj	32	7	30+1	7	1	0
13	GK	(Bosnia and Herzegovina) BIH	Kenan Pirić	29	0	28	0	1	0
14	MF	(Montenegro) MNE	Edvin Kuč	10	0	1+8	0	1	0
15	DF	(Azerbaijan) AZE	Elvin Badalov	32	1	30+1	1	1	0
17	DF	(Azerbaijan) AZE	Murad Khachayev	17	0	9+7	0	0+1	0
18	MF	(Nigeria) NGR	Ifeanyi Mathew	28	3	21+5	3	2	0
19	FW	(Azerbaijan) AZE	Agadadash Salyanski	14	2	1+11	1	0+2	1
22	MF	(Paraguay) PAR	Luis Ortíz	26	0	7+17	0	1+1	0
23	MF	(Ecuador) ECU	Jordan Rezabala	26	0	12+13	0	0+1	0
24	DF	(Senegal) SEN	Moustapha Seck	32	0	27+3	0	2	0
27	DF	(Romania) ROU	Cristian Costin	7	0	4+1	0	2	0
28	FW	(Luxembourg) LUX	Alessio Curci	19	2	2+17	2	0	0
33	FW	(Brazil) BRA	Breno Almeida	12	3	11+1	3	0	0
45	FW	(Cameroon) CMR	Vincent Aboubakar	18	9	5+11	7	2	2
47	MF	(Azerbaijan) AZE	Murad Mammadov	19	2	4+13	1	1+1	1
70	MF	(Ukraine) UKR	Andriy Shtohrin	13	1	7+6	1	0	0
77	DF	(Mali) MLI	Falaye Sacko	28	0	25+3	0	0	0
Players away on loan:
Players who left Neftçi during the season:

=== Goal scorers ===
Place	Position	Nation	Number	Name	Premier League	Azerbaijan Cup	Total
1	FW	(Germany)	9	Bassala Sambou	11	0	11
1	MF	(Azerbaijan)	8	Emin Mahmudov	11	0	11
3	FW	(Cameroon)	45	Vincent Aboubakar	7	2	9
4	FW	(France)	11	Imad Faraj	7	0	7
5	FW	(Venezuela)	10	Freddy Vargas	5	0	5
6	MF	(Azerbaijan)	7	Emil Safarov	3	0	3
6	FW	(Brazil)	33	Breno Almeida	3	0	3
6	MF	(Nigeria)	18	Ifeanyi Mathew	3	0	3
9	FW	(Luxembourg)	28	Alessio Curci	2	0	2
9	FW	(Azerbaijan)	19	Agadadash Salyanski	1	1	2
9	MF	(Azerbaijan)	47	Murad Mammadov	1	1	2
12	DF	(Brazil)	5	Igor Ribeiro	1	0	1
12	DF	(Azerbaijan)	15	Elvin Badalov	1	0	1
12	MF	(Ukraine)	70	Andriy Shtohrin	1	0	1
12	MF	(Benin)	6	Sessi D'Almeida	0	1	1
12				Own goal	0	1	1
				TOTALS	57	6	63

=== Clean sheets ===
Place	Position	Nation	Number	Name	Premier League	Azerbaijan Cup	Total
1	GK	(Bosnia and Herzegovina)	13	Kenan Pirić	10	0	10
2	GK	(Azerbaijan)	1	Emil Balayev	4	0	4
				TOTALS	13	0	13

Kenan Pirić & Emil Balayev both played in Neftçi's 6-0 victory over İmişli on 20 March 2026

=== Disciplinary record ===
Number	Nation	Position	Name	Premier League		Azerbaijan Cup		Total	
Number	Nation	Position	Name	Booked	Sent off (straight red)	Booked	Sent off (straight red)	Booked	Sent off (straight red)
1	(Azerbaijan)	GK	Emil Balayev	2	0	0	0	2	0
4	(Azerbaijan)	MF	Elvin Camalov	2	0	0	0	2	0
5	(Brazil)	DF	Igor Ribeiro	6	1	1	0	7	1
6	(Benin)	MF	Sessi D'Almeida	4	0	1	0	5	0
7	(Azerbaijan)	MF	Emil Safarov	5	1	0	0	5	1
8	(Azerbaijan)	MF	Emin Mahmudov	2	0	0	0	2	0
9	(Germany)	FW	Bassala Sambou	3	0	1	0	4	0
10	(Venezuela)	FW	Freddy Vargas	5	0	0	0	5	0
11	(France)	FW	Imad Faraj	3	0	0	0	3	0
13	(Bosnia and Herzegovina)	GK	Kenan Pirić	1	0	0	0	1	0
14	(Montenegro)	MF	Edvin Kuč	2	0	1	0	3	0
15	(Azerbaijan)	DF	Elvin Badalov	7	1	0	0	7	1
17	(Azerbaijan)	DF	Murad Khachayev	1	0	0	0	1	0
18	(Nigeria)	MF	Ifeanyi Mathew	2	1	0	0	2	1
19	(Azerbaijan)	FW	Agadadash Salyanski	1	0	0	0	1	0
22	(Paraguay)	MF	Luis Ortíz	4	0	0	0	4	0
23	(Ecuador)	MF	Jordan Rezabala	3	0	0	0	3	0
24	(Senegal)	DF	Moustapha Seck	4	0	0	0	4	0
27	(Romania)	DF	Cristian Costin	1	0	0	0	1	0
33	(Brazil)	FW	Breno Almeida	0	1	0	0	0	1
47	(Azerbaijan)	MF	Murad Mammadov	0	0	1	0	1	0
70	(Ukraine)	MF	Andriy Shtohrin	2	0	0	0	2	0
77	(Mali)	DF	Falaye Sacko	1	0	0	0	1	0
Players away on loan:
Players who left Neftçi during the season:
			TOTALS	61	5	5	0	66	5
