= 2015–16 FC Porto season =

Porto
2015–16 season
- President: Jorge Nuno Pinto da Costa
- Head coach: Julen Lopetegui (July 2015 – January 2016); Rui Barros (January 2016); José Peseiro (January 2016 – May 2016)
- Stadium: Estádio do Dragão
- Primeira Liga: 3rd
- Taça de Portugal: Runners-up
- Taça da Liga: Third round
- UEFA Champions League: Group stage
- UEFA Europa League: Round of 32
- Top goalscorer: League: Vincent Aboubakar (13); All: Vincent Aboubakar (18)
- Highest home attendance: 49,209; Porto 1–0 Benfica (20 September 2015)
- Lowest home attendance: 4,863; Porto 2–0 Gil Vicente (2 March 2016)
- Average home league attendance: 32,324
Home colours	Away colours	Third colours

The 2015–16 season was FC Porto's 106th competitive season and the 82nd consecutive season in the top flight of Portuguese football. It started on 15 August 2015 and concluded on 22 May 2016. For the second consecutive season, Porto failed to win any of the official competitions it was involved. The last time the team had two successive trophyless seasons was from 1979–80 to 1980–81.

As in the previous season, Porto did not begin their campaign by playing the Supertaça Cândido de Oliveira, as they failed to qualify for the 2015 edition by not winning the 2014–15 Primeira Liga title (retained by Benfica) or the 2014–15 Taça de Portugal (won by Sporting CP). Their 2015–16 Primeira Liga debut match was a 3–0 home win against Vitória de Guimarães, with Cameroon striker Vincent Aboubakar scoring the team's first official goal. Porto finished the league in third place with 73 points, 15 points behind three-time champions Benfica and 13 points behind runners-up Sporting CP, thus failing to win the title for the third successive season, which had not happened since the 2001–02 season.

Besides the league, Porto competed in other domestic competitions. In the 2015–16 Taça de Portugal, they reach the final, five years after their last appearance, but were defeated 5–4 on penalties by Braga, after a 2–2 draw at the end of extra time. The team also participated in the 2015–16 Taça da Liga, but were eliminated in the starting round after finishing last in their third-round group, with three defeats.

In UEFA competitions, Porto started the season in the 2015–16 UEFA Champions League, having qualified directly for the group stage for the 20th time, a competition record shared with Barcelona, Manchester United and Real Madrid. Having finished third in their group, Porto were demoted to the 2015–16 Europa League; they lost to Borussia Dortmund with a 3–0 aggregate score and were eliminated in the round of 32.

== Players ==
=== Squad information ===
N	Pos.	Nat.	Name	Age	EU	Since	App	Goals	Ends	Transfer fee	Notes
1	GK	(Brazil)	Helton	48	EU	2005	334	0	2017	Undisclosed	Second nationality: Portugal
2	DF	(Uruguay)	Maxi Pereira	42	EU	2015	42	1	2018	Free	
3	DF	(Netherlands)	Bruno Martins Indi	34	EU	2014	70	2	2018	€7.7M	Second nationality: Portugal
5	DF	(Spain)	Iván Marcano	39	EU	2014	65	2	2018	€2.65M	
6	MF	(Portugal)	Rúben Neves	29	EU	2014	75	3	2019	Youth system	
7	FW	(Portugal)	Silvestre Varela	41	EU	2009	179	50	2018	Undisclosed	
8	MF	(Algeria)	Yacine Brahimi	36	EU	2014	86	22	2019	€6.5M	Second nationality: France
9	FW	(Cameroon)	Vincent Aboubakar	34	Non-EU	2014	62	26	2018	€3M	
11	FW	(Mali)	Moussa Marega	35	Non-EU	2016	13	1	2020	€3.8M	
12	GK	(Spain)	Iker Casillas	45	EU	2015	40	0	2017	Undisclosed	
13	MF	(Portugal)	Sérgio Oliveira	34	EU	2015	18	3	2020	Undisclosed	
14	DF	(Spain)	José Ángel	37	EU	2014	29	0	2018	Free	
15	MF	(Brazil)	Evandro	40	EU	2014	56	6	2018	€2.35M	Second nationality: Serbia
16	MF	(Mexico)	Héctor Herrera	36	Non-EU	2013	115	19	2019	€8M	
17	FW	(Mexico)	Jesús Corona	33	Non-EU	2015	35	8	2020	€10.5M	
19	FW	(Portugal)	André Silva	31	EU	2015	14	3	2019	Youth system	Also played for Porto B
20	MF	(Portugal)	André André	37	EU	2015	37	6	2019	€1.5M	
21	DF	(Mexico)	Miguel Layún	38	EU	2015	41	6	2016	Undisclosed	Loan from Watford; Second nationality: Spain
22	MF	(Portugal)	Danilo Pereira	35	EU	2015	45	6	2019	€2.8M	
23	FW	(Spain)	Alberto Bueno	38	EU	2015	8	2	2020	Free	
39	FW	(South Korea)	Suk Hyun-jun	34	Non-EU	2016	14	2	2020	€1.5M	
42	DF	(Venezuela)	Víctor García	32	Non-EU	2013	5	0	2016	€1.8M	Also played for Porto B
47	FW	(Panama)	Ismael Díaz	29	Non-EU	2016	1	0	2016	Undisclosed	Also played for Porto B
48	MF	(Portugal)	Francisco Ramos	31	EU	2016	4	0	2019	Youth system	Also played for Porto B
63	DF	(Nigeria)	Chidozie Awaziem	29	EU	2016	13	1	2020	Undisclosed	Also played for Porto B

- Source: FC Porto
- Ordered by squad number.

=== Transfers ===
==== In ====
Date	Pos.	Name	Nationality	Age	Transferred from	Window	Until	Fee	Ref.
25 May 2015	FW	Alberto Bueno	Spain	38	Rayo Vallecano (Spain)	Summer	2020	Free (end of contract)	
25 May 2015	MF	Sérgio Oliveira	Portugal	34	Paços de Ferreira	Summer	2020	Undisclosed	
12 June 2015	MF	André André	Portugal	37	Vitória de Guimarães	Summer	2019	€1.5M	
1 July 2015	MF	Giannelli Imbula	France	34	Marseille (France)	Summer	2020	€20M	
2 July 2015	MF	Danilo Pereira	Portugal	35	Portimonense	Summer	2019	€2.8M (80% rights)	
11 July 2015	GK	Iker Casillas	Spain	45	Real Madrid (Spain)	Summer	2017	Undisclosed	
15 July 2015	DF	Maxi Pereira	Uruguay	42	Benfica	Summer	2018	Free (end of contract)	
5 August 2015	FW	Dani Osvaldo	Italy	40	Southampton (England)	Summer	2016	Free (end of contract)	
31 August 2015	FW	Jesús Corona	Mexico	33	Twente (Netherlands)	Summer	2020	€10.5M (70% rights)	
14 January 2016	FW	Suk Hyun-jun	South Korea	35	Vitória de Setúbal	Winter	2020	€1.5M (75% rights)	
25 January 2016	FW	Moussa Marega	Mali	35	Marítimo	Winter	2020	€3.8M	
25 January 2016	GK	José Sá	Portugal	33	Marítimo	Winter	2020	Undisclosed	

==== Loan in ====
Date	Pos.	Name	Nationality	Age	Loaned from	Window	Until	Ref.
5 August 2015	DF	Aly Cissokho	France	39	Aston Villa (England)	Summer	30 June 2016	
31 August 2015	DF	Miguel Layún	Mexico	38	Watford (England)	Summer	30 June 2016	

==== Loan return ====
Date	Pos.	Name	Nationality	Age	Returned from	Window	Until	Ref.
7 July 2015	FW	Silvestre Varela	Portugal	41	Parma (Italy)	Summer	2018	

==== Out ====
Date	Pos.	Name	Nationality	Age	Transferred to	Window	Fee	Ref.
1 April 2015	DF	Danilo	Brazil	35	Real Madrid (Spain)	Summer	€31.5M	
4 July 2015	MF	Carlos Eduardo	Brazil	37	Al-Hilal (Saudi Arabia)	Summer	Undisclosed	
14 July 2015	FW	Kléber	Brazil	36	Beijing Guoan (China)	Summer	€3M	
15 July 2015	FW	Jackson Martínez	Colombia	40	Atlético Madrid (Spain)	Summer	€35M (95% rights)	
21 July 2015	FW	Ricardo Quaresma	Portugal	43	Beşiktaş (Turkey)	Summer	€1.2M	
13 August 2015	DF	Daniel Opare	Ghana	36	FC Augsburg (Germany)	Summer	Free (terminated contract)	
20 August 2015	DF	Alex Sandro	Brazil	35	Juventus (Italy)	Summer	€26M	
31 August 2015	DF	Rolando	Portugal	35	Marseille (France)	Summer	Undisclosed	
31 August 2015	FW	Djalma	Angola	39	Gençlerbirliği (Turkey)	Summer	Free (terminated contract)	
31 December 2015	FW	Walter	Brazil	37	Atlético Paranaense (Brazil)	Winter	Undisclosed	
8 January 2016	FW	Dani Osvaldo	Italy	40	Boca Juniors (Argentina)	Winter	Free (terminated contract)	
1 February 2016	MF	Giannelli Imbula	France	34	Stoke City (England)	Winter	€24M	

==== Loan out ====
Date	Pos.	Name	Nationality	Age	Loaned to	Window	Until	Ref.
2 July 2015	DF	Abdoulaye Ba	Senegal	35	Fenerbahçe (Turkey)	Summer	30 June 2016	
2 July 2015	GK	Fabiano	Brazil	38	Fenerbahçe (Turkey)	Summer	30 June 2016	
10 July 2015	FW	Nabil Ghilas	Algeria	36	Levante (Spain)	Summer	30 June 2016	
13 July 2015	MF	Josué	Portugal	36	Bursaspor (Turkey)	Summer	26 January 2016	
16 July 2015	FW	Licá	Portugal	38	Vitória de Guimarães	Summer	30 June 2016	
16 July 2015	FW	Otávio	Brazil	31	Vitória de Guimarães	Summer	30 June 2016	
16 July 2015	GK	Andrés Fernández	Spain	39	Granada (Spain)	Summer	30 June 2016	
20 July 2015	DF	Diego Reyes	Mexico	34	Real Sociedad (Spain)	Summer	30 June 2016	
20 July 2015	FW	Leocísio Sami	Guinea-Bissau	37	Akhisar Belediyespor (Turkey)	Summer	30 June 2016	
23 July 2015	GK	Sinan Bolat	Turkey	38	Club Brugge (Belgium)	Summer	30 June 2016	
29 July 2015	FW	Gonçalo Paciência	Portugal	32	Académica de Coimbra	Summer	30 June 2016	
31 July 2015	MF	Tiago Rodrigues	Portugal	34	Marítimo	Summer	30 June 2016	
27 August 2015	GK	Ricardo Nunes	Portugal	44	Vitória de Setúbal	Summer	30 June 2016	
31 August 2015	FW	Adrián López	Spain	38	Villarreal (Spain)	Summer	30 June 2016	
31 August 2015	MF	Juan Quintero	Colombia	33	Rennes (France)	Summer	30 June 2016	
31 August 2015	FW	Hernâni	Portugal	35	Olympiacos (Greece)	Summer	30 June 2016	
31 August 2015	FW	Ricardo Pereira	Portugal	33	Nice (France)	Summer	30 June 2017	
22 January 2016	DF	Igor Lichnovsky	Chile	32	Sporting Gijón (Spain)	Winter	30 June 2016	
26 January 2016	MF	Josué	Portugal	36	Braga	Winter	30 June 2016	
4 February 2016	FW	Kelvin	Brazil	33	São Paulo (Brazil)	Winter	31 December 2016	
10 February 2016	GK	Raúl Gudiño	Mexico	30	União da Madeira	Winter	30 June 2016	
15 February 2016	DF	Maicon	Brazil	38	São Paulo (Brazil)	Winter	30 June 2016	

==== End of loan ====
Date	Pos.	Name	Nationality	Age	Returned to	Window	Ref.
8 May 2015	MF	José Campaña	Spain	33	Sampdoria (Italy)	Summer	
23 May 2015	MF	Óliver Torres	Spain	32	Atlético Madrid (Spain)	Summer	
5 June 2015	MF	Casemiro	Brazil	34	Real Madrid (Spain)	Summer	
18 December 2015	DF	Aly Cissokho	France	39	Aston Villa (England)	Winter	
22 January 2016	FW	Cristian Tello	Spain	35	Barcelona (Spain)	Winter	

== Pre-season and friendlies ==
The pre-season started on 6 July 2015 and included seven preparation matches, six of which played outside Portugal. From 10 to 18 July, the team was based at Horst, Netherlands, and played two matches against Dutch and German opposition. Season preparations continued at Marienfeld, Germany, from 23 to 31 July, where Porto staged two more matches against top-flight German teams before competing at the inaugural Colonia Cup tournament on 1–2 August. The pre-season ended on 8 August with a match against Napoli at the Estádio do Dragão, integrated in the team's presentation.

Win Draw Loss

15 July 2015 Friendly	Fortuna Sittard	1–5	Porto	Sittard, Netherlands
18:00 CEST (UTC+02:00)	Hutten 14'	Report	Silva 2', 25'; Varela 8' (pen.); André 29'; Brahimi 88'	Stadium: Offermans Joosten-stadion; Referee: Kevin Blom (Netherlands)

18 July 2015 Friendly	MSV Duisburg	0–2	Porto	Duisburg, Germany
18:00 CEST (UTC+02:00)		Report	Brahimi 60'; Hernâni 64'	Stadium: Schauinsland-Reisen-Arena; Attendance: 7,020; Referee: Sascha Stegemann (Germany)

24 July 2015 Friendly	Borussia Mönchengladbach	2–1	Porto	Mönchengladbach, Germany
19:00 CEST (UTC+02:00)	Stindl 20'; Traoré 39'	Report	Aboubakar 49'	Stadium: Stadion im Borussia-Park; Referee: Guido Winkmann (Germany)

27 July 2015 Friendly	Schalke 04	0–0	Porto	Gütersloh, Germany
18:00 CEST (UTC+02:00)		Report		Stadium: Heidewaldstadion; Referee: Martin Thomsen (Germany)

1 August 2015 Colonia Cup	Valencia	0–0 (4–5 p)	Porto	Cologne, Germany
17:45 CEST (UTC+02:00)		Report		Stadium: RheinEnergieStadion; Referee: Sascha Stegemann (Germany)
	Penalties
	Parejo (penalty scored); De Paul (penalty scored); Fuego (penalty missed); Feghouli (penalty scored); Negredo (penalty scored); Cancelo (penalty missed)		(penalty scored) Varela; (penalty scored) Maicon; (penalty missed) Oliveira; (penalty scored) Imbula; (penalty scored) Neves; (penalty scored) Martins Indi

2 August 2015 Colonia Cup	Porto	3–0	Stoke City	Cologne, Germany
17:45 CEST (UTC+02:00)	Aboubakar 33'; Bueno 38'; Brahimi 71' (pen.)	Report		Stadium: RheinEnergieStadion; Referee: Guido Winkmann (Germany)

8 August 2015 Presentation	Porto	0–0	Napoli	Porto
20:30 WEST (UTC+01:00)		Report		Stadium: Estádio do Dragão; Attendance: 48,109; Referee: Vasco Santos

== Competitions ==
=== Overall record ===
Performance by competition
Competition	Starting round	Final position/round	First match	Last match
Primeira Liga	—N/a	3rd	15 August 2015	14 May 2016
Taça de Portugal	Third round	Runners-up	17 October 2015	22 May 2016
Taça da Liga	Third round	Third round (4th)	29 December 2015	27 January 2016
UEFA Champions League	Group stage	Group stage (3rd)	16 September 2015	9 December 2015
UEFA Europa League	Round of 32	Round of 32	18 February 2016	25 February 2016

Statistics by competition
Competition	Pld	W	D	L	GF	GA	GD	Win%
Primeira Liga	34	23	4	7	67	30	+37	67.65
Taça de Portugal	7	6	1	0	13	2	+11	85.71
Taça da Liga	3	0	0	3	1	6	−5	0.00
UEFA Champions League	6	3	1	2	9	8	+1	50.00
UEFA Europa League	2	0	0	2	0	3	−3	0.00
Total	52	32	6	14	90	49	+41	61.54

=== Primeira Liga ===
==== League table ====
Pos	Team	Pld	W	D	L	GF	GA	GD	Pts	Qualification or relegation
1	Benfica (C)	34	29	1	4	88	22	+66	88	Qualification for the Champions League group stage
2	Sporting CP	34	27	5	2	79	21	+58	86	Qualification for the Champions League group stage
3	Porto	34	23	4	7	67	30	+37	73	Qualification for the Champions League play-off round
4	Braga	34	16	10	8	54	35	+19	58	Qualification for the Europa League group stage (Note: Braga qualified for the Europa League group stage by winning the 2015–16 Taça de Portugal.)
5	Arouca	34	13	15	6	47	38	+9	54	Qualification for the Europa League third qualifying round

Source: Liga Portugal, Soccerway
Rules for classification: 1) Points; 2) Head-to-head points; 3) Head-to-head goal difference; 4) Head-to-head away goals scored; 5) Goal difference; 6) Matches won; 7) Goals scored; 8) Play-off.
(Note: LPFP decided that only criteria 1, 5, 6 and 7 would be applied to establish the classification during the competition.)
(C) Champions

==== Results by round ====
Round	1	2	3	4	5	6	7	8	9	10	11	12	13	14	15	16	17	18	19	20	21	22	23	24	25	26	27	28	29	30	31	32	33	34
Ground	H	A	H	A	H	A	H	H	A	H	A	H	A	H	A	H	A	A	H	A	H	A	H	A	A	H	A	H	A	H	A	H	A	H
Result	W	D	W	W	W	D	W	D	W	W	W	W	W	W	L	D	W	L	W	W	L	W	W	W	L	W	W	L	L	W	W	L	W	W
Position	2	3	1	1	1	1	1	2	2	2	2	2	2	1	2	3	3	3	3	3	3	3	3	3	3	3	3	3	3	3	3	3	3	3

Source: Soccerway
A = Away; H = Home; W = Win; D = Draw; L = Loss

==== Matches ====
15 August 2015 1	Porto	3–0	Vitória de Guimarães	Porto
20:45 WEST (UTC+01:00)	Aboubakar 8', 62'; Varela 84'	Report		Stadium: Estádio do Dragão; Attendance: 48,509; Referee: Fábio Veríssimo

22 August 2015 2	Marítimo	1–1	Porto	Funchal, Madeira
20:45 WEST (UTC+01:00)	Costa 5'	Report	Herrera 34'	Stadium: Estádio dos Barreiros; Attendance: 7,200; Referee: Hugo Miguel

29 August 2015 3	Porto	2–0	Estoril	Porto
18:30 WEST (UTC+01:00)	Aboubakar 7'; Maicon 62'	Report		Stadium: Estádio do Dragão; Attendance: 40,609; Referee: Duarte Gomes

12 September 2015 4	Arouca	1–3	Porto	Arouca
20:45 WEST (UTC+01:00)	Maurides 83'	Report	Corona 15', 61'; Aboubakar 71'	Stadium: Estádio Municipal de Arouca; Attendance: 3,355; Referee: João Capela

20 September 2015 5	Porto	1–0	Benfica	Porto
19:15 WEST (UTC+01:00)	André 86'	Report		Stadium: Estádio do Dragão; Attendance: 49,209; Referee: Artur Soares Dias

25 September 2015 6	Moreirense	2–2	Porto	Moreira de Cónegos
20:30 WEST (UTC+01:00)	Medeiros 50'; Fontes 88'	Report	Maicon 18'; Corona 79'	Stadium: Parque de Jogos Comendador Joaquim de Almeida Freitas; Attendance: 4,425; Referee: Vasco Santos

4 October 2015 7	Porto	4–0	Belenenses	Porto
18:15 WEST (UTC+01:00)	Corona 53'; Brahimi 56'; Osvaldo 80'; Marcano 88'	Report		Stadium: Estádio do Dragão; Attendance: 34,109; Referee: Jorge Ferreira

25 October 2015 8	Porto	0–0	Braga	Porto
19:15 WET (UTC±00:00)		Report		Stadium: Estádio do Dragão; Attendance: 40,809; Referee: Artur Soares Dias

8 November 2015 10	Porto	2–0	Vitória de Setúbal	Porto
18:15 WET (UTC±00:00)	Aboubakar 70'; Layún 84'	Report		Stadium: Estádio do Dragão; Attendance: 32,211; Referee: Tiago Martins

28 November 2015 11	Tondela	0–1	Porto	Aveiro
20:45 WET (UTC±00:00)		Report	Brahimi 28'	Stadium: Estádio Municipal de Aveiro; Attendance: 3,449; Referee: Manuel Mota

2 December 2015 9	União da Madeira	0–4	Porto	Funchal, Madeira
20:00 WET (UTC±00:00)		Report	Herrera 12'; Brahimi 14'; Corona 22'; D. Pereira 90+1'	Stadium: Estádio da Madeira; Attendance: 2,277; Referee: Bruno Paixão

5 December 2015 12	Porto	2–1	Paços de Ferreira	Porto
18:30 WET (UTC±00:00)	Corona 29'; Layún 64' (pen.)	Report	Moreira 8'	Stadium: Estádio do Dragão; Attendance: 28,617; Referee: Carlos Xistra

13 December 2015 (Note: The match was abandoned during the second half due to heavy fog, and was resumed on 14 December 2015, 12:30, from the point of abandonment.) 13	Nacional	1–2	Porto	Funchal, Madeira
16:00 WET (UTC±00:00)	Willyan 8'	Report	Marcano 6'; Brahimi 14'	Stadium: Estádio da Madeira; Attendance: 3,425; Referee: Jorge Sousa

20 December 2015 14	Porto	3–1	Académica	Porto
20:30 WET (UTC±00:00)	D. Pereira 7'; Aboubakar 53'; Herrera 72'	Report	Rui Pedro 84'	Stadium: Estádio do Dragão; Attendance: 32,122; Referee: Bruno Esteves

2 January 2016 15	Sporting CP	2–0	Porto	Lisbon
20:45 WET (UTC±00:00)	Slimani 27', 85'	Report		Stadium: Estádio José Alvalade; Attendance: 49,382; Referee: Hugo Miguel

6 January 2016 16	Porto	1–1	Rio Ave	Porto
20:15 WET (UTC±00:00)	Herrera 22'	Report	Novais 33'	Stadium: Estádio do Dragão; Attendance: 19,116; Referee: Rui Costa

10 January 2016 17	Boavista	0–5	Porto	Porto
18:15 WET (UTC±00:00)		Report	Herrera 11'; Corona 62'; Aboubakar 72', 81'; D. Pereira 90+3'	Stadium: Estádio do Bessa; Attendance: 7,483; Referee: Fábio Veríssimo

17 January 2016 18	Vitória de Guimarães	1–0	Porto	Guimarães
20:30 WET (UTC±00:00)	Saré 4'	Report		Stadium: Estádio D. Afonso Henriques; Attendance: 17,201; Referee: Manuel Oliveira

24 January 2016 19	Porto	1–0	Marítimo	Porto
20:30 WET (UTC±00:00)	André 22'	Report		Stadium: Estádio do Dragão; Attendance: 32,120; Referee: Jorge Ferreira

30 January 2016 20	Estoril	1–3	Porto	Estoril
18:30 WET (UTC±00:00)	Diego Carlos 3'	Report	Aboubakar 18'; D. Pereira 33'; André 82'	Stadium: Estádio António Coimbra da Mota; Attendance: 4,539; Referee: Tiago Martins

7 February 2016 21	Porto	1–2	Arouca	Porto
19:15 WET (UTC±00:00)	Aboubakar 14'	Report	González 1', 66'	Stadium: Estádio do Dragão; Attendance: 30,509; Referee: Rui Costa

12 February 2016 22	Benfica	1–2	Porto	Lisbon
20:30 WET (UTC±00:00)	Mitroglou 18'	Report	Herrera 28'; Aboubakar 65'	Stadium: Estádio da Luz; Attendance: 61,536; Referee: Artur Soares Dias

21 February 2016 23	Porto	3–2	Moreirense	Porto
18:15 WET (UTC±00:00)	Layún 41' (pen.); Suk 73'; Evandro 76'	Report	Medeiros 10'; Espinho 28'	Stadium: Estádio do Dragão; Attendance: 30,321; Referee: Luís Ferreira

28 February 2016 24	Belenenses	1–2	Porto	Lisbon
19:15 WET (UTC±00:00)	Juanto 60'	Report	Brahimi 9'; Tonel 19' (o.g.)	Stadium: Estádio do Restelo; Attendance: 7,392; Referee: João Capela

6 March 2016 25	Braga	3–1	Porto	Braga
20:30 WET (UTC±00:00)	Hassan 72'; Silva 89'; Alan 90+4'	Report	M. Pereira 86'	Stadium: Estádio Municipal de Braga; Attendance: 18,202; Referee: Carlos Xistra

12 March 2016 26	Porto	3–2	União da Madeira	Porto
20:45 WET (UTC±00:00)	Aboubakar 24'; Herrera 51'; Corona 87'	Report	Dias 62', 67'	Stadium: Estádio do Dragão; Attendance: 20,309; Referee: Manuel Oliveira

19 March 2016 27	Vitória de Setúbal	0–1	Porto	Setúbal
20:45 WET (UTC±00:00)		Report	Oliveira 45'	Stadium: Estádio do Bonfim; Attendance: 4,483; Referee: Manuel Mota

4 April 2016 28	Porto	0–1	Tondela	Porto
19:00 WEST (UTC+01:00)		Report	Luís Alberto 59'	Stadium: Estádio do Dragão; Attendance: 16,297; Referee: Bruno Esteves

10 April 2016 29	Paços de Ferreira	1–0	Porto	Paços de Ferreira
18:15 WEST (UTC+01:00)	Jota 80'	Report		Stadium: Estádio Capital do Móvel; Attendance: 3,070; Referee: Fábio Veríssimo

17 April 2016 30	Porto	4–0	Nacional	Porto
20:30 WEST (UTC+01:00)	Varela 2'; Herrera 9'; D. Pereira 67'; Aboubakar 85'	Report		Stadium: Estádio do Dragão; Attendance: 27,207; Referee: Luís Ferreira

23 April 2016 31	Académica	1–2	Porto	Coimbra
16:15 WEST (UTC+01:00)	Pedro Nuno 25'	Report	Neves 38'; Brahimi 66'	Stadium: Estádio Cidade de Coimbra; Attendance: 5,085; Referee: Nuno Almeida

30 April 2016 32	Porto	1–3	Sporting CP	Porto
18:30 WEST (UTC+01:00)	Herrera 35' (pen.)	Report	Slimani 23', 44'; Bruno César 85'	Stadium: Estádio do Dragão; Attendance: 41,316; Referee: Artur Soares Dias

7 May 2016 33	Rio Ave	1–3	Porto	Vila do Conde
16:15 WEST (UTC+01:00)	Postiga 5'	Report	Layún 20' (pen.); Oliveira 57'; Varela 88'	Stadium: Estádio do Rio Ave FC; Attendance: 3,201; Referee: Bruno Paixão

14 May 2016 34	Porto	4–0	Boavista	Porto
11:45 WEST (UTC+01:00)	D. Pereira 11'; Layún 56'; Brahimi 85' (pen.); Silva 88'	Report		Stadium: Estádio do Dragão; Attendance: 26,122; Referee: Carlos Xistra

=== Taça de Portugal ===
==== Third round ====
17 October 2015	Varzim	0–2	Porto	Póvoa de Varzim
20:15 WEST (UTC+01:00)			Tello 20'; André 90'	Stadium: Estádio do Varzim SC; Attendance: 7,000; Referee: Manuel Oliveira

==== Fourth round ====
21 November 2015	Angrense	0–2	Porto	Angra do Heroísmo, Azores
18:00 WET (UTC±00:00)			Bueno 14', 40'	Stadium: Estádio João Paulo II; Attendance: 6,000; Referee: Luís Ferreira

==== Fifth round ====
16 December 2015	Feirense	0–1	Porto	Santa Maria da Feira
18:00 WET (UTC±00:00)			Aboubakar 10'	Stadium: Estádio Marcolino de Castro; Attendance: 4,639; Referee: Tiago Martins

==== Quarter-finals ====
13 January 2016	Boavista	0–1	Porto	Porto
20:30 WET (UTC±00:00)			Brahimi 24'	Stadium: Estádio do Bessa; Attendance: 6,234; Referee: Nuno Almeida

==== Semi-finals ====
3 February 2016 1st leg	Gil Vicente	0–3	Porto	Barcelos
20:00 WET (UTC±00:00)			Neves 45+1'; Suk 59'; Oliveira 70'	Stadium: Estádio Cidade de Barcelos; Attendance: 4,092; Referee: Manuel Mota

2 March 2016 2nd leg	Porto	2–0 (5–0 agg.)	Gil Vicente	Porto
21:00 WET (UTC±00:00)	Chidozie 11'; Marega 80'			Stadium: Estádio do Dragão; Attendance: 4,863; Referee: Sérgio Piscarreta

==== Final ====
22 May 2016	Porto	2–2 (a.e.t.) (2–4 p)	Braga	Oeiras
17:15 WEST (UTC+01:00)	Silva 61', 90+1'		Fonte 12'; Josué 58'	Stadium: Estádio Nacional; Attendance: 35,390; Referee: Artur Soares Dias (Porto); Man of the Match: André Silva
	Penalties
	Layún (penalty scored); Herrera (penalty missed); Neves (penalty scored); M. Pereira (penalty missed)		(penalty scored) P. Santos; (penalty scored) Stojiljković; (penalty scored) Hassan; (penalty scored) Marcelo Goiano

=== Taça da Liga ===
==== Third round ====
Pos	Team	Pld	W	D	L	GF	GA	GD	Pts	Qualification
1	Marítimo	3	2	1	0	7	3	+4	7	Advance to knockout phase
2	Feirense	3	2	0	1	5	4	+1	6	
3	Famalicão	3	1	1	1	1	1	0	4	
4	Porto	3	0	0	3	1	6	−5	0	

Source: LPFP
Rules for classification: Tiebreakers

29 December 2015 1	Porto	1–3	Marítimo	Porto
18:00 WET (UTC±00:00)	Aboubakar 90+5'	Report	Fransérgio 48'; Soares 70'; Marega 90+3'	Stadium: Estádio do Dragão; Attendance: 31,219; Referee: Vasco Santos

20 January 2016 2	Famalicão	1–0	Porto	Vila Nova de Famalicão
19:45 WET (UTC±00:00)	Alonso 58'	Report		Stadium: Estádio Municipal 22 de Junho; Attendance: 3,491; Referee: Luís Ferreira

27 January 2016 3	Feirense	2–0	Porto	Santa Maria da Feira
20:15 WET (UTC±00:00)	Castro 39' (pen.); Porcellis 81'	Report		Stadium: Estádio Marcolino de Castro; Attendance: 1,422; Referee: Cosme Machado

=== UEFA Champions League ===
==== Group stage ====
Pos	Team	Pld	W	D	L	GF	GA	GD	Pts	Qualification	CHE	DKV	POR	MTA
1	(England) Chelsea	6	4	1	1	13	3	+10	13	Advance to knockout phase	—	2–1	2–0	4–0
2	(Ukraine) Dynamo Kyiv	6	3	2	1	8	4	+4	11	Advance to knockout phase	0–0	—	2–2	1–0
3	(Portugal) Porto	6	3	1	2	9	8	+1	10	Transfer to Europa League	2–1	0–2	—	2–0
4	(Israel) Maccabi Tel Aviv	6	0	0	6	1	16	−15	0		0–4	0–2	1–3	—

Source: UEFA
Rules for classification: Group stage tiebreakers

16 September 2015 1	Dynamo Kyiv (Ukraine)	2–2	(Portugal) Porto	Kyiv
20:45 CEST (UTC+02:00)	Husyev 20'; Buyalskyi 89'	Report	Aboubakar 23', 81'	Stadium: Olympic Stadium; Attendance: 52,369; Referee: Felix Brych (Germany)

29 September 2015 2	Porto (Portugal)	2–1	(England) Chelsea	Porto
20:45 CEST (UTC+02:00)	André 39'; Maicon 52'	Report	Willian 45+2'	Stadium: Estádio do Dragão; Attendance: 46,120; Referee: Antonio Mateu Lahoz (Spain)

20 October 2015 3	Porto (Portugal)	2–0	(Israel) Maccabi Tel Aviv	Porto
20:45 CEST (UTC+02:00)	Aboubakar 37'; Brahimi 41'	Report		Stadium: Estádio do Dragão; Attendance: 35,209; Referee: Clément Turpin (France)

4 November 2015 4	Maccabi Tel Aviv (Israel)	1–3	(Portugal) Porto	Haifa
20:45 CET (UTC+01:00)	Zahavi 75' (pen.)	Report	Tello 19'; André 49'; Layún 72'	Stadium: Sammy Ofer Stadium; Attendance: 26,646; Referee: Anastasios Sidiropoulos (Greece)

24 November 2015 5	Porto (Portugal)	0–2	(Ukraine) Dynamo Kyiv	Porto
20:45 CET (UTC+01:00)		Report	Yarmolenko 35' (pen.); González 64'	Stadium: Estádio do Dragão; Attendance: 31,220; Referee: Carlos Velasco Carballo (Spain)

9 December 2015 6	Chelsea (England)	2–0	(Portugal) Porto	London
20:45 CET (UTC+01:00)	Marcano 12' (o.g.); Willian 52'	Report		Stadium: Stamford Bridge; Attendance: 41,096; Referee: Cüneyt Çakır (Turkey)

=== UEFA Europa League ===
==== Round of 32 ====
18 February 2016 1st leg	Borussia Dortmund (Germany)	2–0	(Portugal) Porto	Dortmund
19:00 CET (UTC+01:00)	Piszczek 6'; Reus 71'	Report		Stadium: Signal Iduna Park; Attendance: 65,851; Referee: Luca Banti (Italy)

25 February 2016 2nd leg	Porto (Portugal)	0–1 (0–3 agg.)	(Germany) Borussia Dortmund	Porto
21:05 CET (UTC+01:00)		Report	Casillas 23' (o.g.)	Stadium: Estádio do Dragão; Attendance: 32,707; Referee: Mark Clattenburg (England)

== Statistics ==
=== Appearances and discipline ===
No.	Pos.	Nat.	Player	Primeira Liga				Taça de Portugal				Taça da Liga				Europe				Total			
No.	Pos.	Nat.	Player	Apps	Yellow card	Second yellow card	Red card	Apps	Yellow card	Second yellow card	Red card	Apps	Yellow card	Second yellow card	Red card	Apps	Yellow card	Second yellow card	Red card	Apps	Yellow card	Second yellow card	Red card
1	GK	(Brazil)	Helton	2 (0)	0	0	0	7 (0)	2	0	0	3 (0)	0	0	0	0 (0)	0	0	0	12 (0)	2	0	0
2	DF	(Uruguay)	Maxi Pereira	32 (0)	10	0	0	3 (0)	1	0	0	0 (0)	0	0	0	7 (0)	4	0	0	42 (0)	15	0	0
3	DF	(Netherlands)	Bruno Martins Indi	23 (0)	5	1	0	4 (1)	1	0	0	0 (0)	0	0	0	7 (0)	2	0	0	34 (1)	8	1	0
4	DF	(Brazil)	Maicon	14 (3)	3	0	0	2 (0)	1	0	0	3 (0)	1	0	0	3 (0)	2	0	0	22 (3)	7	0	0
5	DF	(Spain)	Iván Marcano	22 (0)	6	0	0	4 (0)	1	0	0	1 (0)	0	0	0	6 (0)	1	0	0	33 (0)	8	0	0
6	MF	(Portugal)	Rúben Neves	22 (9)	5	0	0	6 (4)	0	0	0	2 (0)	0	0	0	8 (1)	1	0	0	38 (14)	6	0	0
7	FW	(Portugal)	Silvestre Varela	22 (13)	2	0	0	6 (0)	0	0	0	3 (0)	0	0	0	3 (1)	1	0	0	34 (14)	3	0	0
8	MF	(Algeria)	Yacine Brahimi	33 (4)	6	0	0	4 (1)	1	0	0	0 (0)	0	0	0	7 (1)	0	0	0	44 (6)	7	0	0
9	FW	(Cameroon)	Vincent Aboubakar	28 (4)	3	1	0	5 (2)	0	0	0	1 (1)	0	0	0	8 (4)	1	0	0	42 (11)	4	1	0
10	FW	(Italy)	Dani Osvaldo	7 (5)	1	0	1	2 (0)	0	0	0	0 (0)	0	0	0	3 (3)	0	0	0	12 (8)	1	0	1
11	FW	(Spain)	Cristian Tello	11 (7)	0	0	0	3 (1)	0	0	0	1 (0)	0	0	0	5 (3)	0	0	0	20 (11)	0	0	0
11	FW	(Mali)	Moussa Marega	9 (9)	0	0	0	2 (0)	0	0	0	0 (0)	0	0	0	2 (0)	0	0	0	13 (9)	0	0	0
12	GK	(Spain)	Iker Casillas	33 (0)	1	0	0	0 (0)	0	0	0	0 (0)	0	0	0	7 (0)	0	0	0	40 (0)	1	0	0
13	MF	(Portugal)	Sérgio Oliveira	9 (1)	3	0	0	5 (1)	0	0	0	3 (0)	1	0	0	1 (0)	0	0	0	18 (2)	4	0	0
14	DF	(Spain)	José Ángel	7 (1)	0	0	0	4 (1)	0	0	0	3 (0)	0	0	0	2 (0)	1	0	0	18 (2)	1	0	0
15	MF	(Brazil)	Evandro	11 (10)	2	0	0	5 (0)	1	0	0	1 (0)	0	0	0	4 (2)	2	0	0	21 (12)	5	0	0
16	MF	(Mexico)	Héctor Herrera	29 (2)	4	0	0	3 (1)	0	0	0	0 (0)	0	0	0	6 (3)	0	0	0	38 (6)	4	0	0
17	FW	(Mexico)	Jesús Corona	28 (2)	3	0	0	1 (1)	0	0	0	2 (2)	0	0	0	4 (2)	1	0	0	35 (7)	4	0	0
19	FW	(Portugal)	André Silva	10 (5)	1	0	0	2 (1)	1	0	0	3 (0)	0	0	0	0 (0)	0	0	0	15 (6)	2	0	0
20	MF	(Portugal)	André André	27 (7)	6	0	0	3 (3)	0	0	0	1 (0)	0	0	0	6 (2)	0	0	0	37 (12)	6	0	0
21	DF	(Mexico)	Miguel Layún	27 (0)	7	0	0	6 (0)	1	0	0	0 (0)	0	0	0	8 (1)	0	0	0	41 (1)	8	0	0
22	MF	(Portugal)	Danilo Pereira	33 (5)	6	0	0	5 (1)	1	0	0	0 (0)	0	0	0	7 (1)	3	0	0	45 (7)	10	0	0
23	FW	(Spain)	Alberto Bueno	4 (3)	0	0	0	4 (1)	0	0	0	0 (0)	0	0	0	0 (0)	0	0	0	8 (4)	0	0	0
24	DF	(Chile)	Igor Lichnovsky	0 (0)	0	0	0	2 (0)	0	0	0	1 (0)	0	0	0	0 (0)	0	0	0	3 (0)	0	0	0
25	MF	(France)	Giannelli Imbula	10 (2)	2	0	0	3 (1)	0	0	1	3 (1)	1	0	0	5 (1)	1	0	0	21 (5)	4	0	1
26	DF	(Brazil)	Alex Sandro	1 (0)	0	0	0	0 (0)	0	0	0	0 (0)	0	0	0	0 (0)	0	0	0	1 (0)	0	0	0
28	DF	(France)	Aly Cissokho	2 (0)	2	0	0	1 (0)	0	0	0	0 (0)	0	0	0	0 (0)	0	0	0	3 (0)	2	0	0
39	FW	(South Korea)	Suk Hyun-jun	9 (5)	0	0	0	1 (0)	0	0	0	2 (0)	0	0	0	2 (2)	1	0	0	14 (7)	1	0	0
42	DF	(Venezuela)	Víctor García	0 (0)	0	0	0	2 (0)	0	0	0	3 (0)	0	0	0	0 (0)	0	0	0	5 (0)	0	0	0
47	FW	(Panama)	Ismael Díaz	0 (0)	0	0	0	0 (0)	0	0	0	1 (1)	0	0	0	0 (0)	0	0	0	1 (1)	0	0	0
48	MF	(Portugal)	Francisco Ramos	3 (3)	0	0	0	0 (0)	0	0	0	1 (1)	0	0	0	0 (0)	0	0	0	4 (4)	0	0	0
63	DF	(Nigeria)	Chidozie Awaziem	10 (0)	2	0	0	2 (0)	1	0	0	1 (0)	0	0	0	0 (0)	0	0	0	13 (0)	3	0	0
71	GK	(Mexico)	Raúl Gudiño	0 (0)	0	0	0	0 (0)	0	0	0	0 (0)	0	0	0	0 (0)	0	0	0	0 (0)	0	0	0
Total					80	2	1		12	0	1		4	0	0		20	0	0		116	2	2

=== Goalscorers ===
Rank	No.	Pos.	Nat.	Player	Primeira Liga	Taça de Portugal	Taça da Liga	Europe	Total
1	9	FW	(Cameroon)	Vincent Aboubakar	13	1	1	3	18
2	8	FW	(Algeria)	Yacine Brahimi	7	1	0	1	9
2	16	MF	(Mexico)	Héctor Herrera	9	0	0	0	9
4	17	FW	(Mexico)	Jesús Corona	8	0	0	0	8
5	20	MF	(Portugal)	André André	3	1	0	2	6
5	21	DF	(Mexico)	Miguel Layún	5	0	0	1	6
5	22	MF	(Portugal)	Danilo Pereira	6	0	0	0	6
8	4	DF	(Brazil)	Maicon	2	0	0	1	3
8	13	MF	(Portugal)	Sérgio Oliveira	2	1	0	0	3
8	19	FW	(Portugal)	André Silva	1	2	0	0	3
8	7	FW	(Portugal)	Silvestre Varela	3	0	0	0	3
12	23	FW	(Spain)	Alberto Bueno	0	2	0	0	2
12	5	DF	(Spain)	Iván Marcano	2	0	0	0	2
12	39	FW	(South Korea)	Suk Hyun-jun	1	1	0	0	2
12	6	MF	(Portugal)	Rúben Neves	1	1	0	0	2
12	11	FW	(Spain)	Cristian Tello	0	1	0	1	2
17	63	DF	(Nigeria)	Chidozie Awaziem	0	1	0	0	1
17	13	MF	(Brazil)	Evandro	1	0	0	0	1
17	11	FW	(Mali)	Moussa Marega	0	1	0	0	1
17	10	FW	(Italy)	Dani Osvaldo	1	0	0	0	1
17	2	DF	(Uruguay)	Maxi Pereira	1	0	0	0	1
Total					66	13	1	9	89
