= Imad Faraj =

French professional footballer (born 1999)

Personal information
- Date of birth: 11 February 1999 (age 27)
- Place of birth: Croix, France
- Height: 1.77 m (5 ft 10 in)
- Position: Right winger

Team information
- Current team: Espérance de Tunis
- Number: 7

Youth career
- 2005–2006: IC Croix
- 2006–2017: Lille

Senior career*
Years	Team	Apps	(Gls)
2016–2020	Lille B	55	(12)
2017–2020	Lille	7	(0)
2019	→ B-SAD (loan)	3	(0)
2019	→ B-SAD U23 (loan)	1	(0)
2020–2021	Mouscron	27	(1)
2021–2025	AEK Larnaca	124	(17)
2025–2026	Neftchi Baku	31	(7)
2026–	Espérance de Tunis	8	(1)

International career
2015	France U16	7	(1)
2015–2016	France U17	2	(0)
2016–2017	France U18	7	(0)
2017	France U19	2	(0)
- * Club domestic league appearances and goals as of 22 November 2026

Imad Faraj (born 11 February 1999) is a French professional footballer who plays as a right winger for Tunisian Ligue Professionnelle 1 club Espérance de Tunis.

== Early life ==
Imad Faraj was born in Croix, in the north of France, and is of Moroccan and Algerian descent. He holds both French and Moroccan nationalities.

== Club career ==
Faraj made his professional debut for Lille in a Ligue 1 2–0 loss to SM Caen on 20 August 2017.

On 31 July 2020, Faraj joined Belgian First Division A club Mouscron on a one-year deal.

On 16 August 2021, he signed a one-year contract with AEK Larnaca in Cyprus, with an option for a second year.

== International career ==
Faraj is a former youth international for France.

== Personal life ==
Faraj is the older brother of Algerian youth international footballer Samy Faraj.

== Career statistics ==
As of match played 22 November 2026

Club	Season	League			National Cup (Note: Includes Coupe de France, Taça de Portugal, Belgian Cup, Cypriot Cup, Azerbaijan Cup and Tunisian Cup)		League Cup (Note: Includes Coupe de la Ligue and Taça da Liga)		Continental		Other		Total	
Club	Season	Division	Apps	Goals	Apps	Goals	Apps	Goals	Apps	Goals	Apps	Goals	Apps	Goals
Lille	2017–18	Ligue 1	7	0	1	0	0	0	—		—		8	0
B-SAD (loan)	2019–20	Primeira Liga	3	0	0	0	1	0	—		—		4	0
Mouscron	2020–21	Belgian First Division A	27	1	1	0	—		—		—		28	1
AEK Larnaca	2021–22	Cypriot First Division	26	2	4	1	—		—		—		30	3
AEK Larnaca	2022–23	Cypriot First Division	31	5	1	0	—		14 (Note: Two appearances in UEFA Champions League, eight appearances and one goal in UEFA Europa League, four appearances in UEFA Conference League)	1	—		46	6
AEK Larnaca	2023–24	Cypriot First Division	35	5	3	0	—		4 (Note: Appearances in UEFA Conference League)	2	—		42	7
AEK Larnaca	2024–25	Cypriot First Division	32	5	6	2	—		2	0	—		40	7
AEK Larnaca	Total		124	17	14	3	—		20	3	—		158	23
Neftchi Baku	2025–26	Azerbaijan Premier League	31	7	1	0	—		—		—		32	7
Neftchi Baku	2026–27	Azerbaijan Premier League	0	0	—		—		2	0	—		2	0
Neftchi Baku	Total		31	7	1	0	—		2	0	—		34	7
Espérance de Tunis	2026–27	Tunisian Ligue Professionnelle 1	8	1	0	0	—		2 (Note: Appearances in CAF Champions League)	1	0	0	10	2
Career total			169	19	16	3	1	0	22	4	0	0	208	26

== Honours ==
AEK Larnaca

- Cypriot Cup: 2024–25
