= 2015 Colonia Cup =

Tournament details
- Host country: Germany
- Dates: 1–2 August
- Teams: 4 (from 1 confederation)
- Venue: 1 (in 1 host city)

Final positions
- Champions: (Germany) 1. FC Köln (1st title)
- Runners-up: (Portugal) Porto
- Third place: (Spain) Valencia
- Fourth place: (England) Stoke City

Tournament statistics
- Matches played: 4
- Goals scored: 11 (2.75 per match)
- Top scorer: 10 players with 1 goal each

The 2015 Colonia Cup was a summer football friendly tournament organized by German club 1. FC Köln and hosted at the RheinEnergieStadion in Cologne, from 1 to 2 August 2015. Besides the hosts, three other European teams took part: Porto (Portugal), Valencia (Spain), and Stoke City (England).

The tournament consisted of four matches (two matches per day), with wins being awarded three points and losses awarded zero points. In case of a draw at the end of 90 minutes of play, a penalty shoot-out would take place to determine the winners. Additionally, each goal scored was rewarded with a point, regardless of the match outcome (penalty shoot-out goals did not count).

== Standings ==
Pos	Team	Pld	W	WP	LP	L	GF	GA	GD	Pts
1	(Germany) 1. FC Köln	2	2	0	0	0	5	3	+2	11
2	(Portugal) Porto	2	1	1	0	0	3	0	+3	9
3	(Spain) Valencia	2	0	0	1	1	2	3	−1	3
4	(England) Stoke City	2	0	0	0	2	1	5	−4	1

Source: Scorespro

== Matches ==
1 August 2015
15:00 CEST

1. FC Köln (Germany)	2–1	(England) Stoke City
Modeste 43'; Gerhardt 89'	Report; Report	Odemwingie 80'

RheinEnergieStadion, Cologne
1 August 2015
17:45 CEST

Valencia (Spain)	0–0	(Portugal) Porto
	Report; Report
Penalties
Parejo (penalty scored); De Paul (penalty scored); Fuego (penalty missed); Feghouli (penalty scored); Negredo (penalty scored); Cancelo (penalty missed)	4–5	(penalty scored) Varela; (penalty scored) Maicon; (penalty missed) Oliveira; (penalty scored) Imbula; (penalty scored) Neves; (penalty scored) Martins Indi

RheinEnergieStadion, Cologne
Referee: Sascha Stegemann (Germany)

2 August 2015
15:00 CEST

1. FC Köln (Germany)	3–2	(Spain) Valencia
Hosiner 19'; Vogt 22'; Jojić 50'	Report; Report	Fuego 41'; Negredo 55'

RheinEnergieStadion, Cologne
2 August 2015
17:45 CEST

Porto (Portugal)	3–0	(England) Stoke City
Aboubakar 33'; Bueno 38'; Brahimi 71'	Report; Report

RheinEnergieStadion, Cologne
