= Vincent Aboubakar =

Cameroonian footballer (born 1992)

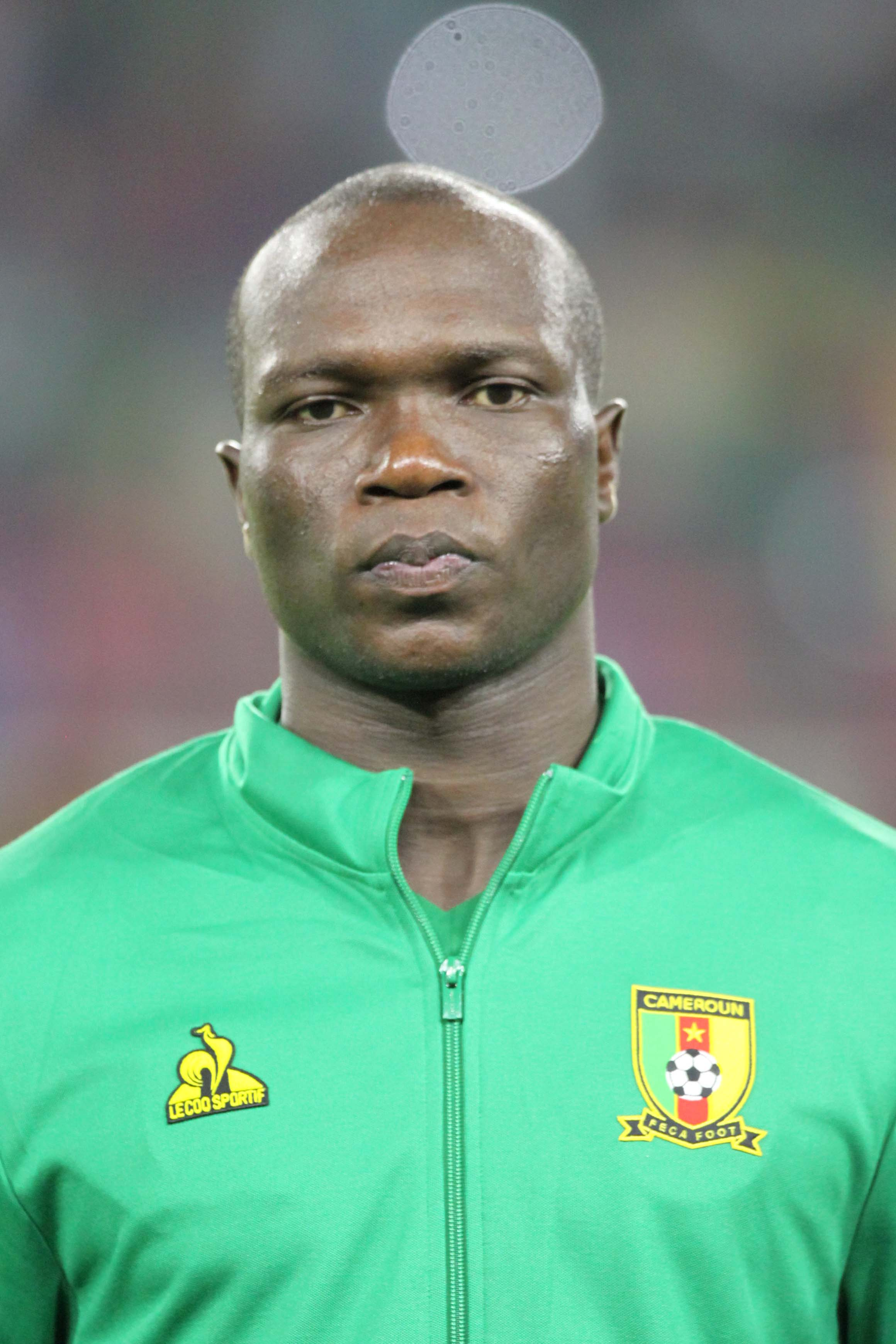
- Aboubakar with Cameroon in 2022

Personal information
- Full name: Vincent Paté Aboubakar
- Date of birth: 22 January 1992 (age 34)
- Place of birth: Garoua, Cameroon
- Height: 1.84 m (6 ft 0 in)
- Position: Striker

Team information
- Current team: Bodrum
- Number: 26

Youth career
- 2006–2008: Coton Sport

Senior career*
Years	Team	Apps	(Gls)
2009–2010	Coton Sport	15	(7)
2010–2013	Valenciennes	72	(9)
2013–2014	Lorient	37	(17)
2014–2020	Porto	83	(36)
2016–2017	→ Beşiktaş (loan)	27	(12)
2020–2021	Beşiktaş	26	(15)
2021–2023	Al Nassr	34	(12)
2023–2024	Beşiktaş	38	(18)
2024–2025	Hatayspor	25	(7)
2025–2026	Neftçi	16	(7)
2026–	Bodrum	10	(5)

International career^{‡}
2009	Cameroon U20	14	(22)
2010–2025	Cameroon	117	(45)
Medal record
Men's football
Representing Cameroon
Africa Cup of Nations
Winner	2017 Gabon
Third place	2021 Cameroon
- * Club domestic league appearances and goals as of 8 November 2026 ‡ National team caps and goals as of 17 November 2026

Vincent Paté Aboubakar (born 22 January 1992) is a Cameroonian professional footballer who plays as striker for TFF 1. Lig club Bodrum and captains the Cameroon national team.

Aboubakar began his career at Coton Sport and moved to Europe in 2010, playing for Ligue 1 clubs Valenciennes and Lorient, totalling 109 appearances and 26 goals in France's top division. In 2015, he signed for Porto, where he played 125 games and scored 58 goals, winning a Primeira Liga title. He won the Turkish Süper Lig while on loan at Beşiktaş in 2017, and again in 2021.

Aboubakar has earned over 110 caps for Cameroon since his international debut in May 2010. He is currently the second-highest scorer in the history of the national team, behind only Samuel Eto'o. He was part of their squads for the 2010, 2014 and 2022 FIFA World Cups, as well as the Africa Cup of Nations in 2015, 2017, 2021 and 2023. Aboubakar scored the winning goal in the final of the 2017 tournament, and was the top goalscorer of the 2021 edition.

== Early life ==
Vincent Aboubakar was born on 22 January 1992 in Garoua, North Region of Cameroon. He was raised in a devout Christian family in a Muslim-majority city and his mother Maobeal Alice was a deaconess for the Evangelical Missionary Society of Cameroon.

== Club career ==
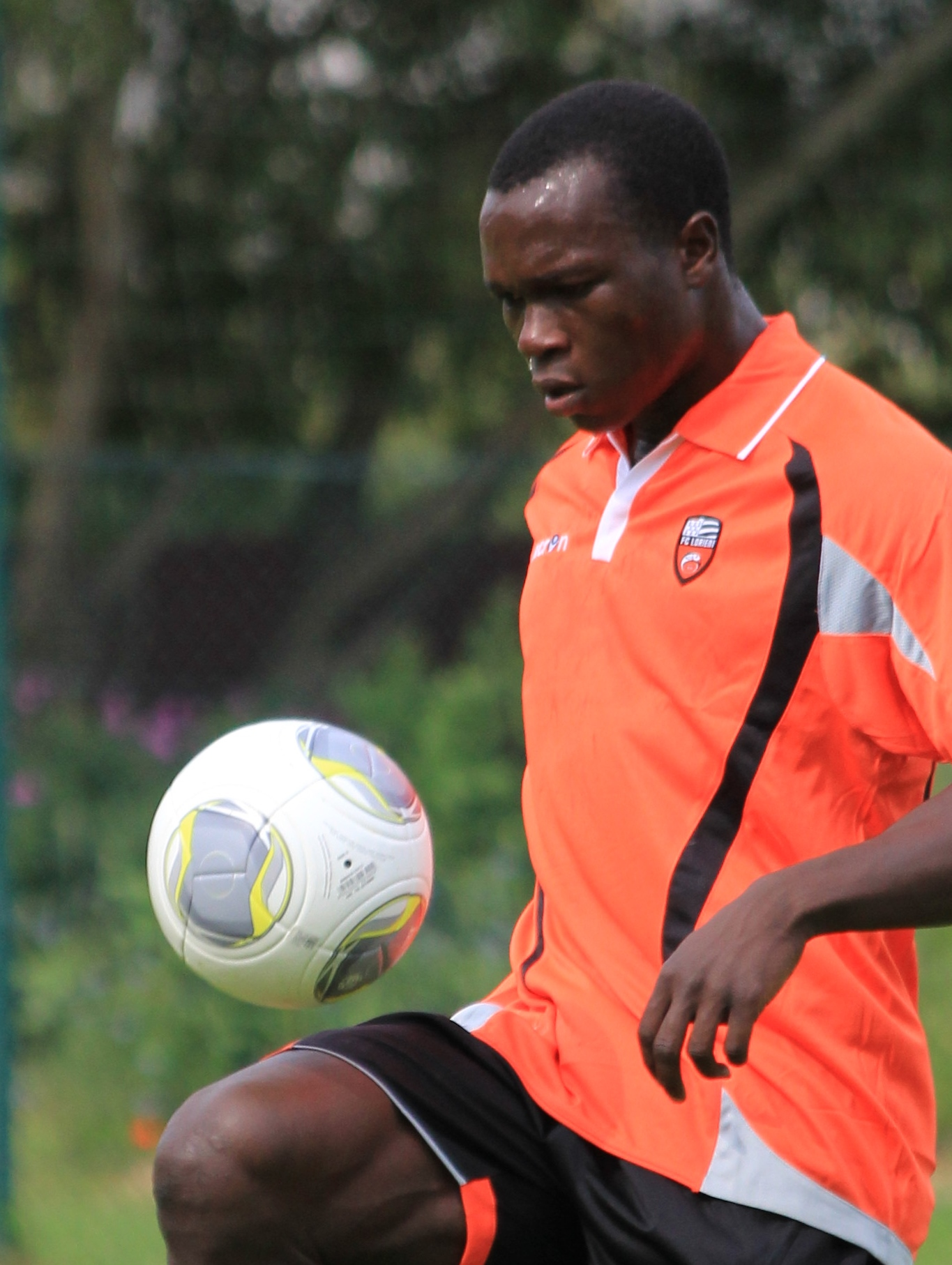
Aboubakar with Lorient in 2013

=== Valenciennes ===
On 26 May 2010, Aboubakar signed with Valenciennes in France. He was assigned the number 9 shirt and made his debut in the club's opening league match of the season against Nice appearing as a substitute. He scored his first goal and hat-trick against Boulogne in Coupe de la Ligue.

=== Lorient ===
Aboubakar signed for Lorient on a free transfer on 1 July 2013. He made his debut for the Breton team on 10 August, playing the full 90 minutes of a 1–0 loss at Lille, and scored his first goal eight days later, equalising in a 2–1 win over Nantes at the Stade du Moustoir. He came joint second top scorer over the season with 16 league goals from 35 appearances, including braces in a 4–0 win at Évian on 23 November and a 4–4 home draw with Montpellier on 20 April 2014.

=== Porto ===
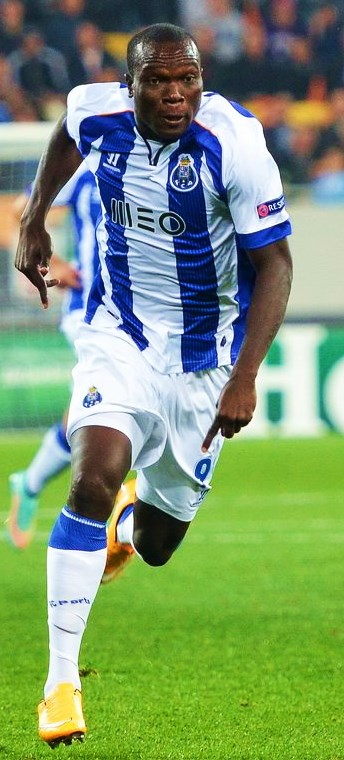
Aboubakar playing for FC Porto in 2014

Aboubakar signed for Porto on 24 August 2014, signing a four-year contract for a fee of €3 million, equivalent to 30% of his economic rights. He had previously been a target for Hull City.

He made his debut on 14 September in a 1–1 Primeira Liga draw at Vitória S.C., replacing Héctor Herrera in added time. Three days later in the UEFA Champions League, after coming on for Jackson Martínez, he scored his first Porto goal to conclude a 6–0 home win over BATE Borisov in the UEFA Champions League group stage. On 25 October, again as the Colombian's replacement, he scored a first league goal to wrap up a 5–0 victory at F.C. Arouca. He was used almost exclusively as a substitute over the season, as Porto finished runners-up to S.L. Benfica.

In his second season in Portugal, following the sale of Martínez, Aboubakar played much more regularly. He opened the season on 15 August 2015 with two goals in a 3–0 win over Vitória at the Estádio do Dragão, and scored twice the following 10 January in a 5–0 win at city rivals Boavista FC. He scored once in five games as the team reached the final of the Taça de Portugal, and scored the only goal of the fifth-round win at C.D. Feirense on 16 December 2015.

==== Loan to Beşiktaş ====
On 27 August 2016, Süper Lig reigning champions Beşiktaş signed Aboubakar on a season-long loan. He made his debut for the Istanbul-based club on 10 September, replacing Olcay Şahan for the last six minutes of a 3–1 home win over Kardemir Karabükspor. He did not score until his eighth match, in which he contributed two goals to a 3–2 Champions League win at Napoli on 19 October 2016 that was his club's first win in the competition since November 2009. Four days later he scored his first league goal, also assisting Talisca in a 3–0 victory over Antalyaspor at Vodafone Park. In March 2017, he scored in each leg of a 5–2 aggregate win over Olympiacos at the round of 16 in the UEFA Europa League, although he was sent off in the second game for fighting with Panagiotis Retsos. He finished the season scoring 12 goals in 27 league appearances, as the Black Eagles retained their league title.

==== Return to Porto ====
After returning to Portugal, Aboubakar was part of a three-pronged attack made of African players, alongside the Malian Moussa Marega and Algeria's Yacine Brahimi. He scored his first hat-trick for the Dragons on 20 August 2017 in a 3–0 home win over Moreirense FC. On 13 September, as the Champions League campaign began with a 3–1 home loss to Beşiktaş, he celebrated with his former teammates in their changing room. He scored five times in the group as Porto advanced, including two-goal hauls in both wins over French champions AS Monaco. On 10 December, he scored another hat-trick in a 5–0 win at Vitória F.C. that put Porto back on top of the table.

In September 2018, Aboubakar suffered an anterior cruciate ligament injury against C.D. Tondela. He underwent surgery, causing a long-term absence. On 4 May 2019, he made his comeback as a late substitute for Marega in a 4–0 home win over C.D. Aves.

On 18 August 2019, Aboubakar played the full 90 minutes of FC Porto B's 1–1 home draw with Varzim S.C. in LigaPro.

=== Return to Beşiktaş ===
After terminating his contract with Porto, Aboubakar returned to Istanbul to meet with Beşiktaş on 25 September 2020. The following day, he signed a contract until 31 May 2021. In his one season back in Istanbul, he was the fifth-highest goalscorer with 15 goals as his team won the league. This included two on 29 November in a 4–3 win at city rivals Fenerbahçe.

=== Al Nassr ===
On 8 June 2021, Aboubakar signed with Saudi Pro League club Al Nassr on a three-year deal. His salary was set at €6 million per year.

Aboubakar reached a mutual agreement to terminate his contract at the Riyadh-based club in January 2023, being compensated for what remained of it. His exit was required in order to free a foreigner quota place for Cristiano Ronaldo.

=== Third stint at Beşiktaş ===
On 21 January 2023, Aboubakar re-signed with Turkish club Beşiktaş as a replacement for departing striker Wout Weghorst. The 2 1/2-year deal involved a €1.1 million signing bonus and €1.5 million for the 2022–23 season, and €3.1 million per season for the remaining seasons, in addition to a maximum of €12,000 per match depending on the duration and type of competition." Aboubakar scored 13 goals from 16 matches in second half of the season, placing him ninth in the Süper Lig top scorers list for 2022–23.

On 11 December 2023, it was officially announced that Aboubakar has been excluded from the squad along with Valentin Rosier, Eric Bailly, Rachid Ghezzal and Jean Onana due to poor performance and incompatibility within the team.

On 14 February 2024, Aboubakar had been pardoned by the club, and started training with the team. He has been included in the squad for the upcoming game against Konyaspor.

=== Hatayspor ===
Aboubakar signed with Turkish club Hatayspor after terminating his contract with Beşiktaş for an undisclosed reason. On 9 May 2025, Aboubakar has terminated his contract with Turkish side Hatayspor by mutual agreement.

=== Neftçi PFK ===
On 21 October 2025, Aboubakar signed for Azerbaijani Premier League club Neftçi on a one-year deal, with an option for a further year. On 26 May 2026, Neftçi announced that Aboubakar would be leaving the club after his contract had expired.

== International career ==
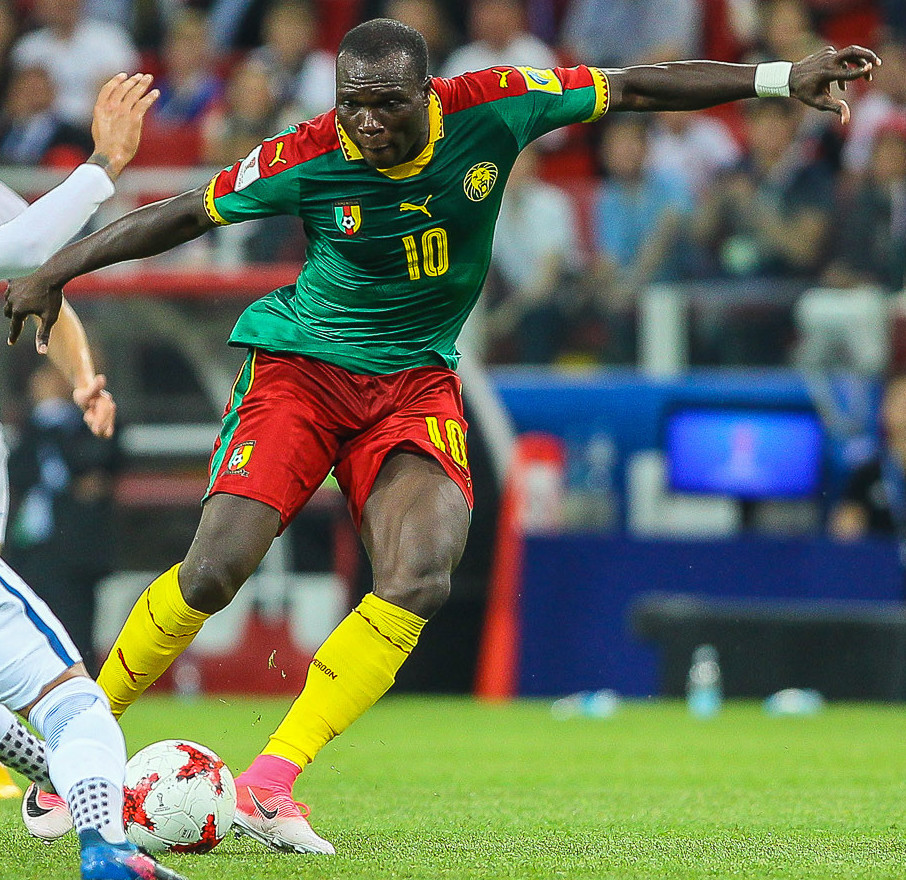
Aboubakar at the 2017 FIFA Confederations Cup

On 18 August 2009, Aboubakar was called up to the Cameroon national under-20 football team for the Francophone Games in Beirut.

In May 2010, aged 18, he was named to the Cameroon 23-man squad for the 2010 FIFA World Cup. Aboubakar was the only player in the squad who was based in Cameroon. He made his debut in the friendly match on 29 May 2010 against Slovakia. On 11 August 2010, Aboubakar scored his first goal for the national team, in a friendly against Poland.

He was called up for the 2014 FIFA World Cup in Brazil, and subsequently for the 2015 Africa Cup of Nations. In the 2017 Africa Cup of Nations, Aboubakar scored an 88th-minute goal in the final to hand Cameroon a comeback 2–1 victory against Egypt to end his nation's 15-year wait for a continental crown.

Later that year, he was part of the Cameroon squad at the 2017 FIFA Confederations Cup in Russia. He scored a consolation goal in their 3–1 loss to world champions Germany in Sochi on 25 June.

Aboubakar was a noted absence from Cameroon's 2019 Africa Cup of Nations squad, with manager Clarence Seedorf doubting his fitness after his recent return from long-term injury.

Aboubakar returned to the national team for the 2021 Africa Cup of Nations, hosted by his country at the start of the following year. He scored five group stage goals against Burkina Faso, Ethiopia and Cape Verde, followed by a sixth in a 2–1 win over Comoros in the last 16. In the third-place match against Burkina Faso, he scored twice in a 3–3 draw, which was eventually won on penalties. With 8 goals in 7 games, he was the top scorer and made the Team of the Tournament.

In the 2022 FIFA World Cup, he scored a goal and provided an assist in a 3–3 draw against Serbia. His goal was described as an "outrageous scoop" by BBC Sport. He scored the winning goal against Brazil in the third match, after which he drew his second yellow card for taking off his shirt and was therefore sent off.

Aboubakar was injured before the 2023 Africa Cup of Nations in the Ivory Coast. He recovered in time for the last 16, where his team were eliminated by rivals Nigeria, which also marked his 100th match with the national team. In December 2025, he was excluded from the final squad for the 2025 Africa Cup of Nations.

== Career statistics ==
=== Club ===
As of match played 8 November 2026

Appearances and goals by club, season and competition
Club	Season	League			National cup (Note: Includes Coupe de France, Taça de Portugal, Turkish Cup, King Cup)		League cup (Note: Includes Coupe de la Ligue, Taça da Liga)		Continental		Other		Total	
Club	Season	Division	Apps	Goals	Apps	Goals	Apps	Goals	Apps	Goals	Apps	Goals	Apps	Goals
Coton Sport	2009–10	Elite One	15	7	0	0	—		—		—		15	7
Valenciennes	2010–11	Ligue 1	17	1	1	0	2	3	—		—		20	4
Valenciennes	2011–12	Ligue 1	27	6	4	2	0	0	—		—		31	8
Valenciennes	2012–13	Ligue 1	28	2	0	1	1	0	—		—		30	3
Valenciennes	Total		72	9	6	3	3	3	—		—		81	15
Lorient	2013–14	Ligue 1	35	16	0	0	0	0	—		—		36	16
Lorient	2014–15	Ligue 1	2	1	0	0	0	0	—		—		2	1
Lorient	Total		37	17	1	0	0	0	—		—		38	17
Porto	2014–15	Primeira Liga	14	4	0	0	2	1	4 (Note: Appearances in UEFA Champions League)	3	—		20	8
Porto	2015–16	Primeira Liga	28	13	5	1	1	1	8 (Note: Six appearances and three goals in UEFA Champions League, two appearances in UEFA Europa League)	3	—		42	18
Porto	2017–18	Primeira Liga	28	15	5	4	4	2	6	5	—		43	26
Porto	2018–19	Primeira Liga	8	4	0	0	1	0	1	0	1 (Note: Appearance in Supertaça Cândido de Oliveira)	0	11	4
Porto	2019–20	Primeira Liga	5	0	2	0	0	0	2 (Note: One appearance in UEFA Champions League, one appearance and two goals in UEFA Europa League)	2	—		9	2
Porto	Total		83	36	12	5	8	4	21	13	1	0	125	58
Beşiktaş (loan)	2016–17	Süper Lig	27	12	2	1	—		9 (Note: Six appearances and three goals in UEFA Champions League, three appearances and three goals in UEFA Europa League)	6	—		38	19
Beşiktaş	2020–21	Süper Lig	26	15	3	1	—		0	0	—		29	16
Al Nassr	2021–22	Saudi Pro League	23	8	1	0	–		3 (Note: Appearances in AFC Champions League)	1	–		27	9
Al Nassr	2022–23	Saudi Pro League	11	4	1	0	–		–		0	0	12	4
Al Nassr	Total		34	12	2	0	–		3	1	0	0	39	13
Beşiktaş	2022–23	Süper Lig	16	13	—		—		—		—		16	13
Beşiktaş	2023–24	Süper Lig	22	5	2	0	—		10 (Note: Appearances in UEFA Europa Conference League)	7	—		34	12
Beşiktaş	Total		38	18	2	0	—		10	7	—		50	25
Hatayspor	2024–25	Süper Lig	25	7	3	1	—		—		—		28	8
Neftçi	2025–26	Azerbaijan Premier League	16	7	2	2	—		—		—		18	9
Bodrum	2026–27	TFF First League	10	5	0	0	—		—		—		10	5
Career total			369	145	31	13	11	7	43	27	1	0	454	192

=== International ===
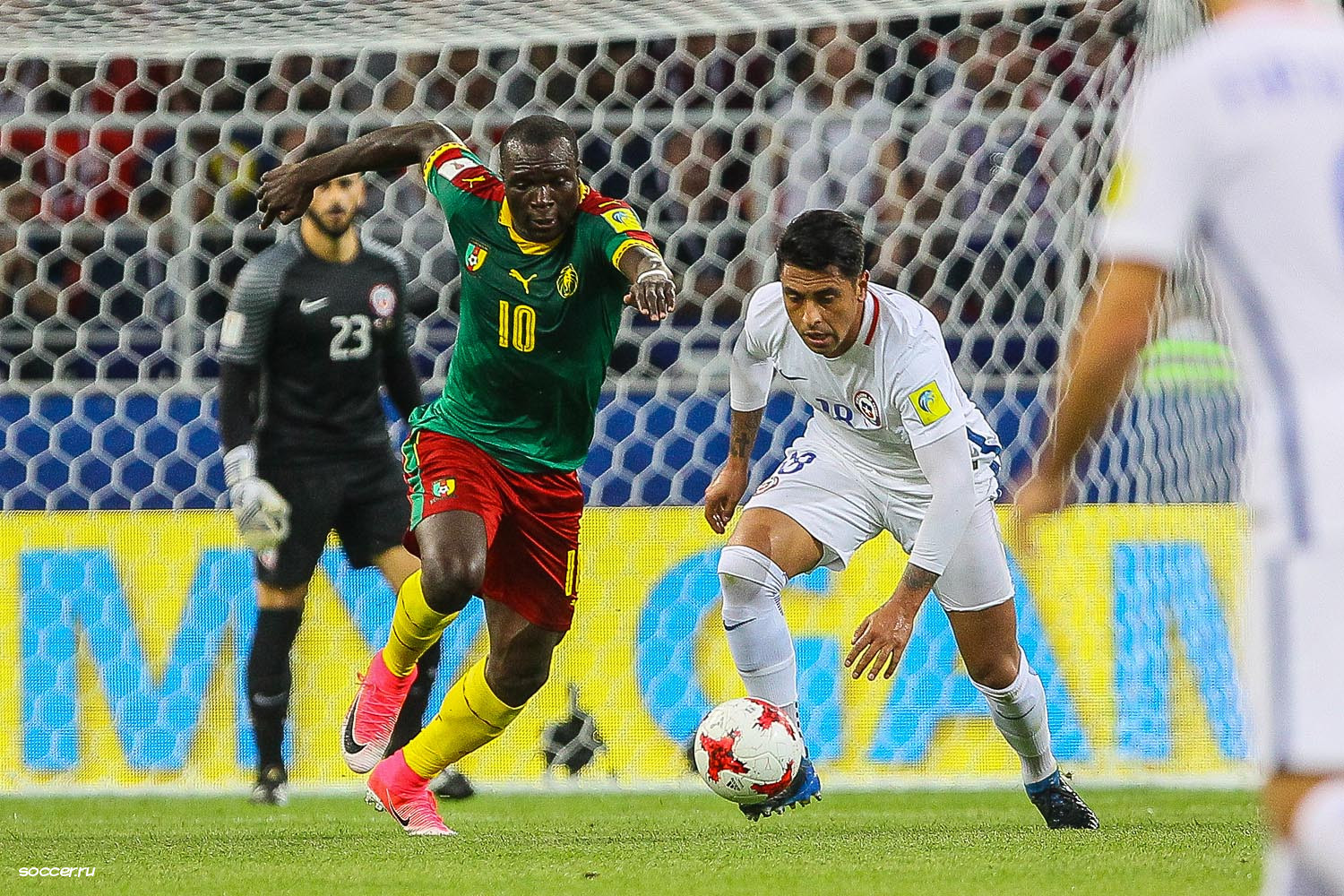
Aboubakar playing against Chile at the 2017 Confederations Cup

As of match played 13 November 2025

Appearances and goals by national team and year
National team	Year	Apps	Goals
Cameroon	2010	7	1
Cameroon	2011	5	0
Cameroon	2012	5	0
Cameroon	2013	4	0
Cameroon	2014	10	5
Cameroon	2015	12	6
Cameroon	2016	5	2
Cameroon	2017	16	5
Cameroon	2018	1	1
Cameroon	2019	2	0
Cameroon	2020	2	3
Cameroon	2021	8	2
Cameroon	2022	17	10
Cameroon	2023	4	2
Cameroon	2024	10	5
Cameroon	2025	9	3
Total		117	45

As of match played 9 June 2025
Scores and results list Cameroon's goal tally first, score column indicates score after each Aboubakar goal.

List of international goals scored by Vincent Aboubakar
No.	Date	Venue	Cap	Opponent	Score	Result	Competition
1	11 August 2010	Stadion Poznań, Poznań, Poland	5	Poland	3–0	3–0	Friendly
2	5 March 2014	Estádio Dr. Magalhães Pessoa, Leiria, Portugal	22	Portugal	1–1	1–5	Friendly
3	6 September 2014	Stade TP Mazembe, Lubumbashi, DR Congo	27	DR Congo	2–0	2–0	2015 Africa Cup of Nations qualification
4	10 September 2014	Ahmadou Ahidjo Stadium, Yaoundé, Cameroon	28	Ivory Coast	2–1	4–1	2015 Africa Cup of Nations qualification
5	10 September 2014	Ahmadou Ahidjo Stadium, Yaoundé, Cameroon	28	Ivory Coast	3–1	4–1	2015 Africa Cup of Nations qualification
6	15 November 2014	Ahmadou Ahidjo Stadium, Yaoundé, Cameroon	30	DR Congo	1–0	1–0	2015 Africa Cup of Nations qualification
7	10 January 2015	Stade d'Angondjé, Libreville, Gabon	32	South Africa	1–0	1–1	Friendly
8	25 March 2015	Gelora Delta Stadium, Sidoarjo, Indonesia	36	Indonesia	1–0	1–0	Friendly
9	6 June 2015	Stade Yves-du-Manoir, Colombes, France	37	Burkina Faso	1–1	3–2	Friendly
10	14 June 2015	Ahmadou Ahidjo Stadium, Yaoundé, Cameroon	39	Mauritania	1–0	1–0	2017 Africa Cup of Nations qualification
11	6 September 2015	Independence Stadium, Bakau, Gambia	40	Gambia	1–0	1–0	2017 Africa Cup of Nations qualification
12	13 November 2015	Stade Général Seyni Kountché, Niamey, Niger	42	Niger	2–0	3–0	2018 FIFA World Cup qualification
13	30 May 2016	Stade de la Beaujoire, Nantes, France	45	France	1–1	2–3	Friendly
14	12 November 2016	Kouekong Stadium, Bafoussam, Cameroon	48	Zambia	1–1	1–1	2018 FIFA World Cup qualification
15	5 February 2017	Stade de l'Amitié, Libreville, Gabon	54	Egypt	2–1	2–1	2017 Africa Cup of Nations final
16	24 March 2017	Mustapha Ben Jannet Stadium, Monastir, Tunisia	55	Tunisia	1–0	1–0	Friendly
17	10 June 2017	Ahmadou Ahidjo Stadium, Yaoundé, Cameroon	57	Morocco	1–0	1–0	2019 Africa Cup of Nations qualification
18	25 June 2017	Fisht Olympic Stadium, Sochi, Russia	60	Germany	1–2	1–3	2017 FIFA Confederations Cup
19	4 September 2017	Ahmadou Ahidjo Stadium, Yaoundé, Cameroon	62	Nigeria	1–1	1–1	2018 FIFA World Cup qualification
20	25 March 2018	Jaber Al-Ahmad International Stadium, Kuwait City, Kuwait	65	Kuwait	1–0	3–1	Friendly
21	12 November 2020	Reunification Stadium, Douala, Cameroon	68	Mozambique	1–0	4–1	2021 Africa Cup of Nations qualification
22	12 November 2020	Reunification Stadium, Douala, Cameroon	68	Mozambique	2–0	4–1	2021 Africa Cup of Nations qualification
23	16 November 2020	Estádio do Zimpeto, Maputo, Mozambique	69	Mozambique	1–0	2–0	2021 Africa Cup of Nations qualification
24	3 September 2021	Paul Biya Stadium, Yaoundé, Cameroon	72	Malawi	1–0	2–0	2022 FIFA World Cup qualification
25	13 November 2021	Orlando Stadium, Johannesburg, South Africa	76	Malawi	1–0	4–0	2022 FIFA World Cup qualification
26	9 January 2022	Paul Biya Stadium, Yaoundé, Cameroon	78	Burkina Faso	1–1	2–1	2021 Africa Cup of Nations
27	9 January 2022	Paul Biya Stadium, Yaoundé, Cameroon	78	Burkina Faso	2–1	2–1	2021 Africa Cup of Nations
28	13 January 2022	Paul Biya Stadium, Yaoundé, Cameroon	79	Ethiopia	2–1	4–1	2021 Africa Cup of Nations
29	13 January 2022	Paul Biya Stadium, Yaoundé, Cameroon	79	Ethiopia	3–1	4–1	2021 Africa Cup of Nations
30	17 January 2022	Paul Biya Stadium, Yaoundé, Cameroon	80	Cape Verde	1–0	1–1	2021 Africa Cup of Nations
31	24 January 2022	Paul Biya Stadium, Yaoundé, Cameroon	81	Comoros	2–0	2–1	2021 Africa Cup of Nations
32	5 February 2022	Ahmadou Ahidjo Stadium, Yaoundé, Cameroon	84	Burkina Faso	2–3	3–3	2021 Africa Cup of Nations
33	5 February 2022	Ahmadou Ahidjo Stadium, Yaoundé, Cameroon	84	Burkina Faso	3–3	3–3	2021 Africa Cup of Nations
34	28 November 2022	Al Janoub Stadium, Al Wakrah, Qatar	93	Serbia	2–3	3–3	2022 FIFA World Cup
35	2 December 2022	Lusail Stadium, Lusail, Qatar	94	Brazil	1–0	1–0	2022 FIFA World Cup
36	28 March 2023	Dobsonville Stadium, Johannesburg, South Africa	95	Namibia	1–2	1–2	2023 Africa Cup of Nations qualification
37	12 September 2023	Roumdé Adjia Stadium, Garoua, Cameroon	96	Burundi	3–0	3–0	2023 Africa Cup of Nations qualification
38	8 June 2024	Ahmadou Ahidjo Stadium, Yaoundé, Cameroon	101	Cape Verde	2–0	4–1	2026 FIFA World Cup qualification
39	8 June 2024	Ahmadou Ahidjo Stadium, Yaoundé, Cameroon	101	Cape Verde	3–1	4–1	2026 FIFA World Cup qualification
40	7 September 2024	Japoma Stadium, Doaula, Cameroon	103	Namibia	1–0	1–0	2025 Africa Cup of Nations qualification
41	11 October 2024	Japoma Stadium, Doaula, Cameroon	105	Kenya	1–0	4–1	2025 Africa Cup of Nations qualification
42	19 November 2024	Ahmadou Ahidjo Stadium, Yaoundé, Cameroon	108	Zimbabwe	1–0	2–1	2025 Africa Cup of Nations qualification
43	25 March 2025	Ahmadou Ahidjo Stadium, Yaoundé, Cameroon	110	Libya	1–0	3–1	2026 FIFA World Cup qualification
44	25 March 2025	Ahmadou Ahidjo Stadium, Yaoundé, Cameroon	110	Libya	3–0	3–1	2026 FIFA World Cup qualification
45	9 June 2025	Marrakesh Stadium, Marrakesh, Morocco	112	Equatorial Guinea	1–0	1–1	Friendly

== Honours ==
Coton Sport

- Elite One: 2009–10

Beşiktaş

- Süper Lig: 2016–17, 2020–21
- Turkish Cup: 2020–21, 2023–24
- Turkish Super Cup: 2024

Porto

- Primeira Liga: 2017–18, 2019–20
- Taça de Portugal: 2019–20
- Supertaça Cândido de Oliveira: 2018

Cameroon

- Africa Cup of Nations: 2017

Individual

- Africa Cup of Nations Golden Boot: 2021
- Africa Cup of Nations Team of the Tournament: 2021
- France Football Africa Team of the Year: 2017

== See also ==
- List of men's footballers with 100 or more international caps
