= Freddy Vargas (Venezuelan footballer) =

Venezuelan footballer (born 1999)

Personal information
- Full name: Freddy Enrique Vargas Piñero
- Date of birth: 1 April 1999 (age 27)
- Place of birth: Barquisimeto, Venezuela
- Height: 5 ft 10 in (1.78 m)
- Position: Winger

Team information
- Current team: Neftçi
- Number: 10

Senior career*
Years	Team	Apps	(Gls)
2017–2022	Deportivo Lara	114	(10)
2021	→ FC Dallas (loan)	13	(0)
2021	→ North Texas SC (loan)	4	(1)
2022–2024	Metropolitanos	38	(5)
2023–2024	→ Maccabi Bnei Reineh (loan)	31	(4)
2024–	Maccabi Netanya	30	(4)
2025–	→ Neftçi (loan)	32	(5)

International career^{‡}
2018	Venezuela U20	1	(0)
2021–	Venezuela	3	(0)
- * Club domestic league appearances and goals as of 22 June 2026 ‡ National team caps and goals as of 9 September 2021

Freddy Enrique Vargas Piñero (born 1 April 1999) is a Venezuelan professional footballer who plays as a winger for Azerbaijan Premier League club Neftçi on loan from Israeli club Maccabi Netanya.

== Club career ==
Born in Barquisimeto, Vargas made his professional debut for Deportivo Lara on 15 April 2017 in a Primera División match against Trujillanos. He started and played the first half before being substituted during the 1–1 draw. Vargas then scored his first professional career goal on 23 August 2017 in a Copa Venezuela match against Atletico Guanare. He scored the 3rd goal in a 5–0 victory.

=== FC Dallas (loan) ===
On 15 January 2021, it was announced that Vargas had joined Major League Soccer side FC Dallas on loan from Deportivo Lara for the 2021 season.

== International career ==
He made his debut for Venezuela national football team on 9 September 2021 in a World Cup qualifier against Paraguay.

== Career statistics ==
=== Club ===
As of match played 1 June 2024

Appearances and goals by club, season and competition
Club	Season	League			Cup		Continental		Total	
Club	Season	Division	Apps	Goals	Apps	Goals	Apps	Goals	Apps	Goals
Deportivo Lara	2017	Venezuelan Primera División	26	1	2	1	0	0	28	2
Deportivo Lara	2018	Venezuelan Primera División	25	2	0	0	1	0	26	2
Deportivo Lara	2019	Venezuelan Primera División	28	2	1	0	8	1	37	3
Deportivo Lara	2020	Venezuelan Primera División	22	5	0	0	0	0	22	5
Deportivo Lara	2022	Venezuelan Primera División	13	0	0	0	0	0	13	0
Deportivo Lara	Total		114	10	3	1	9	1	126	12
FC Dallas (loan)	2021	Major League Soccer	13	0	0	0	0	0	13	0
North Texas SC (loan)	2021	MLS Next Pro	4	1	0	0	0	0	4	1
Metropolitanos	2022	Venezuelan Primera División	20	2	0	0	0	0	20	2
Metropolitanos	2023	Venezuelan Primera División	18	3	0	0	6	1	24	3
Metropolitanos	Total		38	5	0	0	6	1	44	5
Maccabi Bnei Reineh	2023–24	Israeli Premier League	31	4	1	0	0	0	32	4
Maccabi Bnei Reineh	Total		31	4	1	0	0	0	32	4
Maccabi Netanya	2024–25	Israeli Premier League	0	0	0	0	0	0	0	0
Maccabi Netanya	Total		0	0	0	0	0	0	0	0
Career total			187	20	4	1	15	2	206	23
