= Murad Mammadov (footballer) =

Azerbaijani footballer

Personal information
- Date of birth: 26 April 2006 (age 20)
- Place of birth: Baku, Azerbaijan
- Height: 1.73 m (5 ft 8 in)
- Position: Midfielder

Team information
- Current team: Pafos
- Number: 47

Youth career
- Neftçi

Senior career*
Years	Team	Apps	(Gls)
2024–2026	Neftçi	33	(2)
2026–	Pafos	0	(0)

International career^{‡}
2022	Azerbaijan U17	3	(2)
2023–2024	Azerbaijan U19	11	(0)
2025–	Azerbaijan U21	11	(1)
2026–	Azerbaijan	1	(0)
- * Club domestic league appearances and goals as of 23 June 2026 ‡ National team caps and goals as of 16 November 2026

Murad Mammadov (born 26 April 2006) is an Azerbaijani professional footballer who plays as a midfielder for Cypriot First Division club Pafos and the Azerbaijan national team.

== Club career ==
On 15 June 2026, Mammadov signed a four-year contract with Pafos FC.

== Honours ==
Pafos

- Cypriot Super Cup: 2026
