= Alessio Curci =

Luxembourgish footballer (born 2002)

Personal information
- Date of birth: 16 February 2002 (age 24)
- Place of birth: Redange-sur-Attert, Luxembourg
- Height: 1.80 m (5 ft 11 in)
- Position: Forward

Team information
- Current team: Borac Banja Luka

Youth career
- –2016: Steinfort
- 2016–2018: Eintracht Trier
- 2018–2020: Mainz 05

Senior career*
Years	Team	Apps	(Gls)
2020–2023	Mainz 05 II	32	(2)
2023–2025	Francs Borains	45	(8)
2025–2026	Neftçi	19	(2)
2026–	Borac Banja Luka	0	(0)

International career^{‡}
2022–	Luxembourg	20	(1)
- * Club domestic league appearances and goals as of 14 November 2026 ‡ National team caps and goals as of 3 June 2026

Alessio Curci (born 16 February 2002) is a Luxembourgish professional footballer who plays as a forward for Bosnian Premier League club Borac Banja Luka and Luxembourg national football team.

== Club career ==
As a youth player, Curci joined the youth academy of Luxembourgish fourth tier side Steinfort. In 2018, he joined the youth academy of Eintracht Trier in the German fourth tier after receiving offers from the youth academies of French Ligue 1 club PSG and Milan in the Italian Serie A.

In 2020, he joined the youth academy of German Bundesliga team Mainz 05.

On 27 July 2023, Curci signed with Francs Borains in Belgium.

Curci inked a three-year deal with Neftçi in the top flight of Azerbaijan on 30 July 2025. On 26 August 2026, Neftçi announced that Curci had left the club after his contract was ended by mutual agreement.

== Career statistics ==
As of match played 3 June 2026

Luxembourg
Year	Apps	Goals
2022	2	1
2023	7	0
2024	4	0
2025	6	0
2026	1	0
Total	20	1

Scores and results list Luxembourg's goal tally first, score column indicates score after each Curci goal.

List of international goals scored by Alessio Curci
No.	Date	Venue	Opponent	Score	Result	Competition
1	17 November 2022	Stade de Luxembourg, Luxembourg City, Luxembourg	Hungary	2–2	2–2	Friendly
