= Cristian Costin =

Romanian footballer

Personal information
- Full name: Cristian Ionuț Costin
- Date of birth: 17 June 1998 (age 28)
- Place of birth: Beclean, Romania
- Height: 1.78 m (5 ft 10 in)
- Positions: Right-back; right midfielder

Team information
- Current team: Chindia Târgoviște
- Number: 27

Youth career
- 2010–2014: Liberty Oradea
- 2014–2015: UTA Arad

Senior career*
Years	Team	Apps	(Gls)
2015–2019	UTA Arad	46	(2)
2017–2018	→ CSMȘ Reșița (loan)	24	(5)
2019–2023	Voluntari	118	(8)
2023–2025	Dinamo București	61	(1)
2025–2026	Neftchi Baku	5	(0)
2026–	Chindia Târgoviște	4	(0)
- * Club domestic league appearances and goals as of 31 October 2026

Cristian Ionuț Costin (born 17 June 1998) is a Romanian professional footballer who plays as a right-back or right midfielder for Liga II club Chindia Târgoviște.

== Career ==
In June 2023, Costin signed with Liga I club Dinamo București. He started the season in the first team, alternating between the full back and winger positions. On 19 August 2023, he scored once and produced an assist for Gonçalo Gregório in the 3–2 away win against his former club Voluntari. For this performance, he was named as man of the match and he was selected in the Liga I team of the week.

== Career statistics ==
As of match played 31 October 2026

Appearances and goals by club, season and competition
Club	Season	League			National cup (Note: Includes Cupa României, Azerbaijan Cup)		Europe		Other		Total	
Club	Season	Division	Apps	Goals	Apps	Goals	Apps	Goals	Apps	Goals	Apps	Goals
UTA Arad	2015–16	Liga II	5	0	0	0	–		1 (Note: Appearances in Liga I promotion/relegation play-offs)	0	6	0
UTA Arad	2016–17	Liga II	8	0	0	0	–		0	0	8	0
UTA Arad	2018–19	Liga II	33	2	1	0	–		–		34	2
UTA Arad	Total		46	2	1	0	–		1	0	48	2
CSMȘ Reșița (loan)	2017–18	Liga III	24	5	1	1	–		–		25	6
Voluntari	2019–20	Liga I	23	0	2	0	–		–		25	0
Voluntari	2020–21	Liga I	33	1	1	0	–		2	0	36	1
Voluntari	2021–22	Liga I	27	6	2	0	–		–		29	6
Voluntari	2022–23	Liga I	35	1	2	0	–		–		37	1
Voluntari	Total		118	8	7	0	–		2	0	127	8
Dinamo București	2023–24	Liga I	28	1	3	0	–		2	0	33	1
Dinamo București	2024–25	Liga I	33	0	4	0	–		–		37	0
Dinamo București	Total		61	1	7	0	–		2	0	70	1
Neftchi Baku	2025–26	Azerbaijan Premier League	5	0	2	0	–		–		7	0
Chindia Târgoviște	2026–27	Liga II	4	0	1	0	–		–		5	0
Career Total			258	16	19	1	0	0	5	0	282	17

== Honours ==
Voluntari

- Cupa României runner-up: 2021–22
