= 2006 Taça de Portugal final =

- Event: 2005–06 Taça de Portugal
Porto	Vitória de Setúbal
1	0
- Date: 14 May 2006
- Venue: Estádio Nacional, Oeiras
- Man of the Match: Adriano (Porto)
- Referee: Duarte Gomes (Lisbon)
- Attendance: 38,000

The 2006 Taça de Portugal final was the final match of the 2005–06 Taça de Portugal, the 66th season of the Taça de Portugal, the premier Portuguese football cup competition organized by the Portuguese Football Federation (FPF). The match was played on 14 May 2006 at the Estádio Nacional in Oeiras, and opposed two Primeira Liga sides: Porto and Vitória de Setúbal. Porto defeated Vitória 1–0 thanks to a second-half strike from Brazilian striker Adriano, which would claim Porto a 13th Taça de Portugal.

In Portugal, the final was televised live on RTP and Sport TV. As Porto claimed both league and cup double in the same season, cup runners-up Vitória de Setúbal faced their cup final opponents in the 2006 Supertaça Cândido de Oliveira at the Estádio Dr. Magalhães Pessoa in Leiria.

== Match ==
=== Details ===
14 May 2006
17:00 WEST

Porto	1–0	Vitória de Setúbal
Adriano 39'

Estádio Nacional, Oeiras
Attendance: 38,000
Referee: Duarte Gomes (Lisbon)

Porto	Vitória de Setúbal

GK	1	(Brazil) Helton	(yellow card) 90'
RB	12	(Portugal) José Bosingwa
CB	14	(Portugal) Pepe	(yellow card) 14'
LB	4	(Portugal) Pedro Emanuel (c)
DM	18	(Brazil) Paulo Assunção
CM	8	(Argentina) Lucho González
CM	30	(Brazil) Anderson		(substituted off) 75'
RM	27	(Brazil) Alan
LM	7	(Portugal) Ricardo Quaresma		(substituted off) 68'
CF	9	(South Africa) Benni McCarthy		(substituted off) 85'
CF	28	(Brazil) Adriano	(yellow card) 81'
Substitutes:
GK	99	(Portugal) Vítor Baía
DF	3	(Portugal) Ricardo Costa
DF	35	(Slovakia) Marek Čech		(substituted on) 75'
MF	6	(Brazil) Ibson		(substituted on) 85'
MF	16	(Portugal) Raul Meireles
FW	17	(Brazil) Jorginho		(substituted on) 68'
FW	39	(Portugal) Hugo Almeida
Manager:
(Netherlands) Co Adriaanse

GK	30	(Brazil) Rubinho
RB	14	(Cape Verde) Janício Martins
CB	23	(Portugal) Nélson Veríssimo
CB	15	(Brazil) Auri	(yellow card) 51'
LB	13	(Brazil) Adalto	(yellow card) 21'	(substituted off) 56'
DM	6	(Brazil) Binho		(substituted off) 81'
RM	11	(Portugal) Bruno Ribeiro	(yellow card) 67'
CM	3	(Portugal) Ricardo Chaves		(substituted off) 68'
CM	61	(Cape Verde) Sandro (c)
LM	26	(Portugal) Silvestre Varela
CF	28	(Portugal) Carlitos
Substitutes:
GK	12	(Portugal) Marco Tábuas
DF	7	(Portugal) Nandinho
DF	19	(Portugal) Flávio Cerqueira
MF	39	(Portugal) Pedro Russiano
FW	8	(Portugal) Pedro Oliveira		(substituted on) 68'
FW	20	(Senegal) Modou Sougou		(substituted on) 56'
FW	47	(Portugal) Diogo Fonseca		(substituted on) 81'
Manager:
(Portugal) Hélio Sousa

2005–06 Taça de Portugal Winners
Porto
13th Title

Man of the match

- (Brazil) Adriano (Porto)

Match officials

- Assistant referees:
  - Arlindo Santos (Lisbon)
  - José Lima (Lisbon)
- Fourth official: Augusto Duarte (Braga)

Match rules

- 90 minutes.
- 30 minutes of extra time if necessary.
- Penalty shoot-out if scores still level.
- Seven named substitutes.
- Maximum of three substitutions.

== See also ==
- 2005–06 FC Porto season
