= 2006 Supertaça Cândido de Oliveira =

- Event: Supertaça Cândido de Oliveira (Portuguese Super Cup)
Porto	Vitória de Setúbal
3	0
- Date: 19 August 2006
- Venue: Estádio Dr. Magalhães Pessoa, Leiria
- Referee: Pedro Proença (Lisbon)
- Attendance: 8,890

The 2006 Supertaça Cândido de Oliveira was the 28th edition of the Supertaça Cândido de Oliveira, the annual Portuguese football season-opening match contested by the winners of the previous season's top league and cup competitions (or cup runner-up in case the league- and cup-winning club is the same). The match was contested between the 2005–06 Primeira Liga and 2005–06 Taça de Portugal winners, Porto, and the cup runners-up, Vitória de Setúbal.

The match took place at the Estádio Dr. Magalhães Pessoa in Leiria, 19 August 2006. In Portugal, the final was televised live on RTP1. Watched by a crowd of 8,890, Porto defeated the Sadinos, 3–0. Goals from Brazilian striker Adriano, midfielder Anderson and 70-minute substitute Vieirinha clinched Porto their 15th Supertaça.

== Background ==
Porto were making their 21st appearance in the Supertaça Cândido de Oliveira. Porto went into the match as 14-time winners (1981, 1983, 1984, 1986, 1990, 1991, 1993, 1994, 1996, 1998, 1999, 2001, 2003, 2004). Of their 21 Supertaça Cândido de Oliveira appearances, the Dragões had lost 6 times (1979, 1985, 1988, 1995, 1997, 2000). Porto's last Supertaça appearance was in 2004, against Benfica. Porto defeated their Lisbon rivals, 1–0. Vitória de Setúbal were appearing in their second Supertaça Cândido de Oliveira. Their first appearance came in the previous season's edition, where they lost to Benfica 1–0.

In Porto's and Vitória de Setúbal's entire history, the two teams had met on 133 different occasions. Porto had accumulated 83 victories while Vitória de Setúbal had accumulated 27 victories; 23 matches had ended in a tie. This encounter in the Supertaça marked the first time these two sides had met in this competition. The last meeting between these two sides, prior to this encounter, was in the domestic cup competition, where the Dragões defeated the Sadinos in the previous season's final of the Taça de Portugal. Porto defeated their opponents 1–0 to claim the cup for a 13th time in their history.

== Pre-match ==
=== Entry ===
Porto qualified for the 2006 Supertaça Cândido de Oliveira by winning the 2005–06 Primeira Liga and the 2005–06 Taça de Portugal. The Primeira Liga title was primarily contested between Porto and Sporting CP. Porto had led the chase the league title for the majority of the season. The Dragões went into game week 32 knowing that victory over already relegated side Penafiel would clinch the league title. Porto defeated Penafiel 1–0, with a second half penalty from Adriano to grant his side a 21st league title. In the same season, Porto also won the Taça de Portugal. The Azuis e Brancos progressed through four rounds to reach the final. Their first two cup ties saw the Portistas progress with the narrowest of scorelines. Victories over Marco and Naval 1º de Maio saw them book a place in the sixth round. After taking a bye to the quarter-finals due to the odd number of teams at the sixth round stage of the competition, Porto met fellow first division side Marítimo, which they won thanks to a 96th-minute extra-time goal from Benni McCarthy. The semi-finals saw Porto face a penalty shootout against rivals Sporting CP. Lisandro López scored the winning penalty to send his side through to the final. In the final, a 39th-minute Adriano goal saw Porto see off Vitória de Setúbal to seal their 13th cup trophy.

As Porto claimed both league and cup in the same season, Vitória de Setúbal qualified for the Supertaça as the cup runner-up. Vitória de Setúbal faced lower league opposition in the first few rounds of the cup. Despite their opposition being of a lower division, Vitória struggled to overcome their opposition. Their first cup tie, saw the Setúbal side progress by the narrowest of margins against third division side Fafe. Their fourth round tie saw yet another away tie, against Pinhalnovense. Vitória progressed to next round after their fourth round tie went to penalties which they won 5–4. After claiming a 2–0 victory over Lixa in the sixth round, the Sadinos faced fellow Primeira Liga side Boavista in the quarter-finals. After the match ended 1–1 in normal time, the match proceeded to extra-time. Carlitos scored the winning goal to send his side through to the semi-finals. Vitória de Guimarães were the opponents for the semi-finals. In a match which proceeded to extra-time, Vitória de Guimarães would score first on 110 minutes through Polish striker Marek Saganowski. Vitória de Setúbal would level through center half Auri on 119 minutes which would take the game to a penalty shootout. In the penalty shootout, Guimarães' Paulo Sérgio missed his spot kick and Carlitos converted his to send his side through to their tenth cup final where they lose to their Supertaça opponents.

=== Officials ===
The match officials for the game were confirmed on the 16 August 2006 by the Portuguese Football Federation. Pedro Proença of Lisbon was named as referee. This was the second time that Proença had officiated a Supertaça match after officiating the 2003 game between Porto and União de Leiria. For the Supertaça, Proença was assisted by Pedro Garcia and José Lima of Lisbon, whilst Hélio Santos of Lisbon was named as the fourth official.

=== Venue ===
The Estádio Dr. Magalhães Pessoa in Leiria was selected by the Portuguese Football Federation to host the match. This was the first time that the stadium had hosted a SuperCup match. At the time of the event, the Estádio Dr. Magalhães Pessoa was used the home ground of União de Leiria. It holds a capacity of 30,000. The stadium was built in 2003 and was one of the stadiums which hosted games at UEFA Euro 2004.

== Match ==
=== Team selection ===
Caretaker manager Rui Barros selected a group of nineteen players as part of the squad who would be taken to Leiria. Barros' squad selection saw him leave out Bruno Moraes, João Paulo, Lucho González, Pedro Emanuel and Tomo Šokota who were unavailable for the game due to injury. The exclusion of first team regulars like González and Pedro Emanuel saw Barros make the surprise inclusion in the Porto squad of Brazilian full back Ezequias and wingers Diogo Valente and Vieirinha. Rui Barros's squad selection for the Supertaça saw him include three newly acquired players: Diogo Valente, Ezequias and Tarik Sektioui. Porto lined up in a very distinct 3–6–1 formation. Barros selected José Bosingwa, Marek Čech and Pepe to comprise the defense while Paulo Assunção was selected to play in the holding role in front of the back line. The major debates in Porto's line-up was whether Moroccan international Tarik Sektioui or Alan would start on the left wing and who would replace Lucho González in midfield. Caretaker manager Barros would select Alan to start on the left wing as well as play Anderson in the attacking midfield role in order to support striker Adriano.

Just like their opponents, Vitória de Setúbal went into the Supertaça with several players missing. Hélio Sousa was unable to count on Serbian goalkeeper Nikola Milojević and Nigerian forward Kevin Amuneke for the match due to both players waiting for their work permits to come through. The Sadinos were also without captain Bruno Ribeiro, Émile Mbamba and Pedro Russiano who were unavailable for the game due to injury. Hélio Sousa's squad selection saw him include eight newly acquired players: César La Paglia, Hugo, João Paulo, Luís Lourenço, Marcelo Labarthe, Mário Carlos, Sandro and Silvestre Varela.

=== Summary ===
Porto dominated the match from the beginning. The first half saw Porto dominate possession, but fail to create many clear cut goal scoring opportunities. The best chance of the first half fell to Raul Meireles. The chance came about after Anderson recovered the ball in the middle of the park, and played a diagonal ball to Meireles, who beat Vitória's Nandinho to ball and saw his shot saved by an on rushing Marco Tábuas. Vitória de Setúbal's only goal scoring chance of the first half came from a set piece. A left wing cross near the middle of the park, saw the ball deflect off Pepe's head, which saw it go towards Helton's direction which forced the Brazilian keeper to tip the ball out for a corner kick. Both sides went into level at the break. The second half started off with a goal for the Portistas. A right sided corner kick saw Vitória fail to clear the ball after two attempts, before the ball fell to Adriano whose bicycle kick beat Vitória's Marco Tábuas to give his side the advantage. Porto's second came on 74 minutes through Anderson. Adriano's kick free kick found Alan on the right and squared the ball to an on rushing Anderson, doubled his side's lead. Porto closed out the scoring on 89 minutes through Vieirinha. Pepe intercepted the ball in the middle of the park and played the ball to substitute Lisandro López in the final third. López would then find Jorginho, who would play in Vieirinha, who beat a Vitória player and fired the ball from outside of the box into the net to make it 3–0.

=== Details ===
19 August 2006
21:00 UTC

Porto	3–0	Vitória de Setúbal
Adriano 53'; Anderson 74'; Vieirinha 89'

Estádio Dr. Magalhães Pessoa, Leiria
Attendance: 8,890
Referee: Pedro Proença (Lisbon)

Porto	Vitória de Setúbal

GK	1	(Brazil) Helton
RB	12	(Portugal) José Bosingwa
CB	3	(Portugal) Pepe
LB	5	(Slovakia) Marek Čech
DM	18	(Brazil) Paulo Assunção (c)	(yellow card) 71'
CM	16	(Portugal) Raul Meireles
CM	6	(Brazil) Ibson
LM	21	(Brazil) Alan
AM	10	(Brazil) Anderson		(substituted off) 87'
RM	7	(Portugal) Ricardo Quaresma	(yellow card) 69'	(substituted off) 70'
CF	28	(Brazil) Adriano		(substituted off) 80'
Substitutes:
GK	99	(Portugal) Vítor Baía
DF	2	(Portugal) Ricardo Costa
DF	14	(Portugal) Bruno Alves
MF	11	(Morocco) Tarik Sektioui
MF	20	(Brazil) Jorginho		(substituted on) 89'
FW	9	(Argentina) Lisandro López		(substituted on) 80'
FW	17	(Portugal) Vieirinha		(substituted on) 70'
Manager:
(Portugal) Rui Barros

GK	12	(Portugal) Marco Tábuas
RB	14	(Cape Verde) Janício
CB	3	(Portugal) Hugo	(yellow card) 79'
CB	15	(Brazil) Auri
LB	82	(Portugal) Nandinho
DM	5	(Brazil) Binho
CM	13	(Brazil) Adalto	(yellow card) 42'	(substituted off) 61'
CM	6	(Cape Verde) Sandro (c)
RW	9	(Brazil) Ademar		(substituted off) 66'
LW	17	(Portugal) Silvestre Varela
CF	10	(Portugal) Luís Lourenço		(substituted off) 74'
Substitutes:
GK	26	(Portugal) João Paulo
DF	23	(Portugal) Veríssimo
MF	7	(Brazil) Marcelo Labarthe		(substituted on) 74'
MF	25	(Senegal) Madior N'Diaye
MF	55	(Portugal) Julien Fernandes
FW	16	(Portugal) Mário Carlos		(substituted on) 66'
FW	47	(Portugal) Diogo Fonseca		(substituted on) 61'
Manager:
(Portugal) Hélio Sousa

2006 Supertaça Cândido de Oliveira Winners
Porto
15th Title

Match officials

- Assistant referees:
  - Pedro Garcia (Lisbon)
  - José Lima (Lisbon)
- Fourth official: Hélio Santos (Lisbon)

Match rules

- 90 minutes
- Penalty shoot-out if scores level after 90 minutes
- Seven named substitutes
- Maximum of three substitutions

== See also ==
- 2006–07 Primeira Liga
- 2006–07 Taça de Portugal
- 2006–07 FC Porto season
