= 2006–07 FC Porto season =

Porto
2006–07 season
- Chairman: Pinto da Costa
- Manager: Co Adriaanse (until 9 August 2006); Rui Barros (caretaker); Jesualdo Ferreira (from 18 August 2006)
- Stadium: Estádio do Dragão
- Primeira Liga: 1st
- Taça de Portugal: Fourth round
- UEFA Champions League: First knockout round
- Supertaça Cândido de Oliveira: Winners
- Top goalscorer: League: Adriano (11); All: Adriano and Lucho González (12)
- Highest home attendance: 50,223 vs Benfica (15 October 2006)
- Lowest home attendance: 26,309 vs Estrela da Amadora (3 February 2007)
Home colours	Away colours

The 2006–07 season was Futebol Clube do Porto's 96th competitive season, 73rd consecutive season in the top flight of Portuguese football, and 113th year in existence as a football club.

Porto's victory in the 2005–06 Primeira Liga, qualified them for the 2006 Supertaça Cândido de Oliveira and the 2006–07 UEFA Champions League group stage. Porto won their first piece of silverware of the season by winning the Supertaça Cândido de Oliveira against Vitória de Setúbal. Jesualdo Ferreira would be appointed as manager shortly afterwards, after Rui Barros had been appointed caretaker manager after Dutch coach Co Adriaanse left the club in August.

The Dragões would progress through the Champions League group stage by finishing second in their group behind Arsenal. The Portistas would be eliminated in the following round, the first knockout round, by English side Chelsea who were led at the time by former Porto coach José Mourinho. Porto were defeated 3–2 on aggregate over two legs.

In the last game of the league season, the Azuis e Brancos would claim a twenty-second league title after a 4–1 home victory over Desportivo das Aves.

== Key events ==
=== July ===
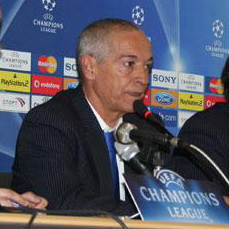
Jesualdo Ferreira was appointed manager in August after Dutch coach Co Adriaanse announced his resignation during Porto's pre-season.

- 10: Portuguese center forward Hugo Almeida joins Bundesliga side Werder Bremen on a seasons long loan.
- 13: Porto announce the signings of Moroccan winger Tarik Sektioui and Brazilian full back Ezequias.
- 22: Porto draw 2–2 with Dutch side Groningen in a pre-season game held in the Netherlands.
- 27: A Bruno Moraes goal grants Porto victory over Dutch side Heracles Almelo in a pre-season friendly game.
- 28: Premier League side Blackburn Rovers announce the signing of South African striker Benni McCarthy for €3.7 million.
- 30: In Porto's official presentation to its members of their 2006–07 squad, the Dragões defeat Italian side Roma, 1–0.

=== August ===
- 9: Porto announce Co Adriaanse's resignation as manager, with assistant coach Rui Barros being appointed as caretaker coach.
- 18: The Portistas confirm the appointment of Jesualdo Ferreira as manager, with immediate effect.
- 19: Porto claim a fifteenth Supertaça Cândido de Oliveira, after defeating Vitória de Setúbal 3–0, thanks to second half goals from Adriano, Anderson and Vieirinha.
- 24: Porto draws Arsenal, CSKA Moscow and Hamburg in the Champions League draw.
- 25: Porto win their first league game of the season, by claiming a 2–1 home win over União de Leiria at the Estádio do Dragão. Adriano and Ricardo Quaresma scored Porto's goals.
- 31: On the last day of the transfer window, Porto sign Uruguayan full back Jorge Fucile from Liverpool de Montevideo. The arrival of Fucile sees the departure of César Peixoto to Spanish side RCD Espanyol on a seasons long loan.

=== September ===
- 10: Porto win their second league game of the season, after defeating Estrela da Amadora 3–0. The match took place at Benfica's Estádio da Luz due to Estrela's home ground Estádio José Gomes being under renovation.
- 13: Porto draws their opening game of the UEFA Champions League group stage. The Portistas earned a point following a goalless match with Russian side CSKA Moscow.
- 17: A Mário Sérgio own goal and first half strike from left back Marek Čech gives Porto a 2–0 away win over Naval 1º de Maio.
- 22: Goals from Hélder Postiga, Lisandro López and Tarik Sektioui sees Porto secure their fourth consecutive win in the league over Beira-Mar.
- 26: Porto suffer their first loss of the season after they lose 2–0 to English side Arsenal in their second UEFA Champions League group stage match. Thierry Henry and Alexander Hleb scored Arsenal's goals which granted the Gunners with three points.

=== October ===
- 2: Jesualdo Ferreira's side suffer their first loss of the league season, by losing 2–1 to Braga at the Estádio Municipal de Braga.
- 17: Goals from Lisandro López, Lucho González and Hélder Postiga gives Porto their first Champions League win of the campaign as the Dragões defeat German side Hamburger SV at the Estádio do Dragão.
- 22: In the first Clássico game of the season, a second-half Ricardo Quaresma goal grants Porto a draw against Sporting CP after Yannick Djaló had scored for the home side.
- 28: A late headed goal from Brazilian striker Bruno Moraes gives the Azuis e Brancos a 3–2 home win over rivals Benfica in Porto's second Clássico game in the space of six days.

=== November ===
- 1: Porto earn a second consecutive Champions League group stage win after a 3–1 away win at Hamburg's Volksparkstadion. A first half wonder strike from Lucho González, and second half goals from Lisandro López and Bruno Moraes gave Porto the three points.
- 21: Porto obtain a third consecutive group stage win by defeating CSKA Moscow 2–0 at the Lokomotiv Stadium. Ricardo Quaresma and Lucho González scored Porto's goals.
- 28: Porto draws third division side Atlético CP in the fourth round of the Taça de Portugal.

=== December ===
- 6: Porto draw 0–0 at home with Arsenal in the last game of the Champions League group stage, and miss out on claiming first place in Group H. The Portistas would finish the group stage campaign with eleven points.
- 15: Porto draws English side Chelsea in the UEFA Champions League first knockout round.
- 22: Porto sign Argentinean full back Lucas Mareque on a three-year contract from River Plate for €1 million.

=== January ===
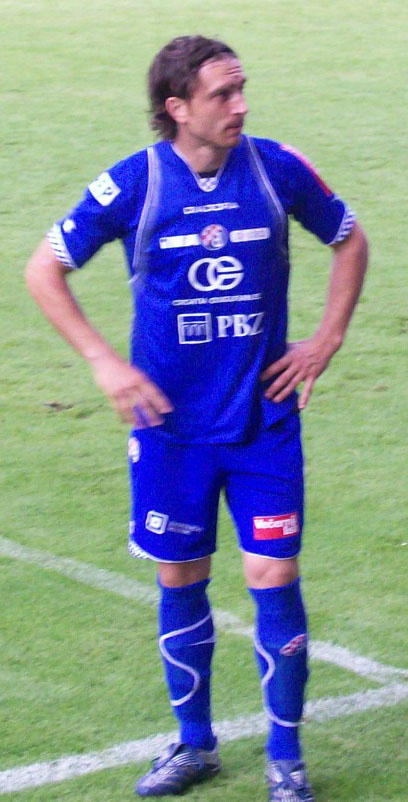
Following Tomo Šokota's release, he would sign for Croatian side Dinamo Zagreb.

- 25: Porto sign Colombian striker Wason Rentería from Brazilian side Internacional on an undisclosed fee.
- 26: A 17th-minute goal from União de Leiria's Damien Tixier inflicts on Porto a second league loss of the season.

=== February ===
- 21: The Azuis e Brancos tie their first leg round of 16 tie against José Mourinho's Chelsea. Porto opened the scoring through Raul Meireles on twelve minutes, but their lead was cancelled out four minutes later through Ukrainian striker Andriy Shevchenko.

=== March ===
- 6: Despite an early Quaresma goal in the second leg of Porto's Champions League tie at Stamford Bridge, Ferreira's side would bow out of the competition after second half goals from Dutch winger Arjen Robben and German midfielder Michael Ballack which provided the Blues with safe passage to the quarter-finals.
- 11: Porto release Croatian striker Tomo Šokota after two seasons at the club.

=== May ===
- 20: A 4–1 home win over Desportivo das Aves in the last game of the league season, sees the Dragões win a 22nd Primeira Liga title.

== Squads ==
=== First team squad ===
Stats as of the end of the 2006–07 season. Games played and goals scored only refers to appearances and goals in the Primeira Liga.

No.	Name	Nationality	Position(s)	Since	Date of birth (age)	Signed from	Games	Goals
Goalkeepers
1	Helton	(Brazil)	GK	2005	18 May 1978 (aged 29)	(Portugal) União de Leiria	41	0
24	Paulo Ribeiro	(Portugal)	GK	2005	6 June 1984 (aged 22)	(Portugal) Vitória de Setúbal	0	0
99	Vítor Baía	(Portugal)	GK	1988	15 October 1969 (aged 37)	(Portugal) Porto Academy	406	0
Defenders
2	Ricardo Costa	(Portugal)	CB / LB / RB	2002	16 May 1981 (aged 26)	(Portugal) Porto Academy	75	3
3	Pepe	(Brazil)	CB	2004	26 February 1983 (aged 24)	(Portugal) Marítimo	64	6
4	Pedro Emanuel	(Portugal)	CB	2002	11 February 1975 (aged 32)	(Portugal) Boavista	95	1
5	Marek Čech	(Slovakia)	LB	2005	26 January 1983 (aged 24)	(Czech Republic) Sparta Prague	36	2
12	José Bosingwa	(Portugal)	RB	2003	24 August 1982 (aged 24)	(Portugal) Boavista	83	3
13	Jorge Fucile	(Uruguay)	RB	2006	19 November 1984 (aged 22)	(Uruguay) Liverpool de Montevideo	18	1
14	Bruno Alves (VC)	(Portugal)	CB	2001	27 November 1981 (aged 25)	(Portugal) Porto Academy	35	2
15	Ezequias	(Brazil)	CB / LB	2006	28 January 1981 (aged 26)	(Portugal) Académica de Coimbra	1	0
25	Lucas Mareque	(Argentina)	LB	2006	12 January 1983 (aged 24)	(Argentina) River Plate	4	0
26	João Paulo	(Portugal)	CB	2006	6 June 1981 (aged 25)	(Portugal) União de Leiria	3	0
Midfielders
6	Ibson	(Brazil)	CM	2005	7 November 1983 (aged 23)	(Brazil) Flamengo	33	2
8	Lucho González (C)	(Argentina)	CM / AM	2005	19 January 1981 (aged 26)	(Argentina) River Plate	60	19
10	Anderson	(Brazil)	AM	2006	13 April 1988 (aged 19)	(Brazil) Grêmio	18	2
16	Raul Meireles	(Portugal)	CM	2004	17 March 1983 (aged 24)	(Portugal) Boavista	56	5
18	Paulo Assunção	(Brazil)	DM	2004	25 January 1980 (aged 27)	(Brazil) Nacional	47	0
20	Jorginho	(Brazil)	AM	2005	6 May 1977 (aged 30)	(Portugal) Vitória de Setúbal	28	3
31	Diogo Valente	(Portugal)	LM	2006	23 September 1984 (aged 22)	(Portugal) Boavista	1	0
35	André Castro	(Portugal)	CM	2007	2 April 1988 (aged 19)	(Portugal) Porto Academy	0	0
Forwards
7	Ricardo Quaresma	(Portugal)	LW / RW	2004	26 September 1983 (aged 23)	(Spain) Barcelona	87	15
9	Lisandro López	(Argentina)	LW / RW / CF	2005	2 March 1983 (aged 24)	(Argentina) Racing Club	51	14
11	Tarik Sektioui	(Morocco)	LW / RW	2006	13 May 1977 (aged 30)	(Netherlands) AZ	4	1
17	Vieirinha	(Portugal)	RW	2005	24 January 1986 (aged 21)	(Portugal) Porto Academy	8	0
19	Tomo Šokota	(Croatia)	CF	2005	8 April 1977 (aged 30)	(Portugal) Benfica	2	0
21	Alan	(Brazil)	AM / RW	2005	19 September 1979 (aged 27)	(Portugal) Marítimo	28	3
22	Wason Rentería	(Colombia)	CF	2007	4 July 1985 (aged 21)	(Brazil) Internacional	6	0
23	Hélder Postiga	(Portugal)	CF	2004	2 August 1982 (aged 24)	(England) Tottenham Hotspur	108	36
28	Adriano	(Brazil)	CF	2006	3 January 1979 (aged 28)	(Brazil) Cruzeiro	33	18
29	Bruno Moraes	(Brazil)	CF	2003	7 July 1984 (aged 22)	(Brazil) Santos	17	2

== Pre-season and friendlies ==
=== Legend ===
Win Draw Loss

=== Matches ===
18 July 2006 Netherlands Tour	Rhoda	0 – 6	Porto
		(Report)	Jorginho 12'; Ibson 14'; Meireles 18'; Adriano 22'; McCarthy 77', 88'

22 July 2006 Netherlands Tour	Groningen	2 – 2	Porto	Groningen
19:00 CET	Nevland 13', 64'	(Report)	Adriano 60'; Bosingwa 90+2'	Stadium: Euroborg; Referee: Roelof Luinge

27 July 2006 Netherlands Tour	Heracles Almelo	0 – 1	Porto	Oldenzaal
19:00 CET		(Report)	Moraes 40'	Stadium: Sportpark Vondersweijde; Referee: Björn Kuipers

30 July 2006 Friendly	Porto	1 – 0	Roma	Porto
	Mexès 39' (o.g.)	(Report)		Stadium: Estádio do Dragão

4 August 2006 Amsterdam Tournament	Manchester United	3 – 1	Porto	Amsterdam
19:00 CET	Scholes 11'; Rooney 19'; Solskjær 73'	(Report)	Pepe 76'	Stadium: Amsterdam Arena; Referee: Ruud Bossen

5 August 2006 Amsterdam Tournament	Inter Milan	3 – 2	Porto	Amsterdam
19:00 CET	Pizarro 7'; Martins 8', 38'	(Report)	Adriano 80'; Čech 90'	Stadium: Amsterdam Arena; Referee: Kevin Blom

10 August 2006 England Tour	Portsmouth	1 – 2	Porto	Portsmouth
19:45 WEST	Todorov 22'		López 11'; Primus 56' (o.g.)	Stadium: Fratton Park

12 August 2006 England Tour	Manchester City	0 – 1	Porto	Manchester
15:00 WEST		(Report)	Adriano 42'	Stadium: City of Manchester Stadium; Attendance: Andre Marriner

== Competitions ==
=== Legend ===
Win Draw Loss

=== Overall ===
Competition	Started round	Final position / round	First match	Last match
Supertaça Cândido de Oliveira	Final	Winners	19 August 2006	
Primeira Liga		1st	25 August 2006	20 May 2007
Taça de Portugal	4th round	4th round	7 January 2007	
UEFA Champions League	Group stage	First knockout round	13 September 2006	6 March 2007

=== Competition record ===
Competition	Record							
Competition	G	W	D	L	GF	GA	GD	Win %
Primeira Liga	30	22	3	5	65	20	+45	73.33
Taça de Portugal	1	0	0	1	0	1	−1	0.00
Supertaça Cândido de Oliveira	1	1	0	0	3	0	+3	100.00
UEFA Champions League	8	3	3	2	11	7	+4	37.50
Total	40	26	6	8	79	28	+51	65.00

=== Supertaça Cândido de Oliveira ===
19 August 2006	Porto	3 – 0	Vitória de Setúbal	Estádio Dr. Magalhães Pessoa, Leiria
21:00 WEST	Adriano 53'; Anderson 74'; Vieirinha 89'			Attendance: 8,890; Referee: Pedro Proença

=== Primeira Liga ===
==== League table ====
Pos	Team	Pld	W	D	L	GF	GA	GD	Pts	Qualification or relegation
1	Porto (C)	30	22	3	5	65	20	+45	69	Qualification to Champions League group stage
2	Sporting CP	30	20	8	2	54	15	+39	68	Qualification to Champions League group stage
3	Benfica	30	20	7	3	55	20	+35	67	Qualification to Champions League third qualifying round
4	Braga	30	14	8	8	35	30	+5	50	Qualification to UEFA Cup first round
5	Belenenses	30	15	4	11	36	29	+7	49	Qualification to UEFA Cup first round

Source: rsssf.com
Rules for classification: 1) points; 2) head-to-head points; 3) head-to-head goal difference; 4) goal difference; 5) number of goals scored
(C) Champions

==== Results summary ====
Overall								Home						Away					
Pld	W	D	L	GF	GA	GD	Pts	W	D	L	GF	GA	GD	W	D	L	GF	GA	GD
30	22	3	5	65	20	+45	69	13	0	2	38	9	+29	9	3	3	27	11	+16

Last updated: 20 May 2007.

==== Results by round ====
Round	1	2	3	4	5	6	7	8	9	10	11	12	13	14	15	16	17	18	19	20	21	22	23	24	25	26	27	28	29	30
Ground	H	A	A	H	A	H	A	H	A	H	A	H	A	H	A	A	H	H	A	H	A	H	A	H	A	H	A	H	A	H
Result	W	W	W	W	L	W	D	W	W	W	W	W	W	W	W	L	L	W	W	W	W	L	D	W	W	W	L	W	D	W
Position	5	1	1	1	1	1	2	1	1	1	1	1	1	1	1	1	1	1	1	1	1	1	1	1	1	1	1	1	1	1

Updated to match(es) played on 20 May 2007. Source:
A = Away; H = Home; W = Win; D = Draw; L = Loss

==== Matches ====
25 August 2006 1	Porto	2 – 1	União de Leiria	Porto
21:30 WET	Adriano 20'; Quaresma 46'		Sougou 68'	Stadium: Estádio do Dragão; Attendance: 40,728; Referee: Duarte Gomes

10 September 2006 2	Estrela da Amadora	0 – 3	Porto	Lisbon
19:15 WET			Duarte 55' (o.g.); Meireles 81'; González 89'	Stadium: Estádio da Luz; Referee: Elmano Santos

17 September 2006 3	Naval 1º de Maio	0 – 2	Porto	Figueira da Foz
21:15 WET			Marek Čech 10'; Mário Sérgio 25' (o.g.)	Stadium: Estádio Municipal José Bento Pessoa; Attendance: 2,515; Referee: Carlos Xistra

22 September 2006 4	Porto	3 – 0	Beira-Mar	Porto
19:15 WET	Postiga 53'; López 78'; Sektioui 90'			Stadium: Estádio do Dragão; Attendance: 31,423; Referee: Olegário Benquerença

2 October 2006 5	Braga	2 – 1	Porto	Braga
21:15 WET	Marcel 24'; Luís Filipe 55'		Postiga 42'	Stadium: Estádio Municipal de Braga; Attendance: 13,740; Referee: Lucílio Batista

14 October 2006 6	Porto	3 – 0	Marítimo	Porto
19:15 WET	Postiga 34', 84'; González 62' (pen.)			Stadium: Estádio do Dragão; Attendance: 33,023; Referee: Bruno Paixão

22 October 2006 7	Sporting CP	1 – 1	Porto	Lisbon
20:30 WET	Djaló 42'		Quaresma 47'	Stadium: Estádio José Alvalade; Attendance: 37,136; Referee: Pedro Proença

28 October 2006 8	Porto	3 – 2	Benfica	Porto
19:45 WET	López 11'; Quaresma 21'; Moraes 90+2'		Katsouranis 62'; Nuno Gomes 81'	Stadium: Estádio do Dragão; Attendance: 50,223; Referee: Lucílio Batista

6 November 2006 9	Vitória de Setúbal	0 – 3	Porto	Setúbal
21:15 WET	López 4'; Postiga 6'; Quaresma 77'			Stadium: Estádio do Bonfim; Referee: Duarte Gomes

18 November 2006 10	Porto	2 – 1	Académica de Coimbra	Porto
21:15 WET	Postiga 4'; Pepe 6'		Álvarez 77'	Stadium: Estádio do Dragão; Attendance: 30,207; Referee: Paulo Paraty

26 November 2006 11	Belenenses	0 – 1	Porto	Lisbon
21:15 WET			Postiga 41'	Stadium: Estádio do Restelo; Referee: Olegário Benquerença

2 December 2006 12	Porto	2 – 0	Boavista	Porto
20:30 WET	Quaresma 51'; Postiga 73'			Stadium: Estádio do Dragão; Attendance: 38,729; Referee: Elmano Santos

11 December 2006 13	Nacional	1 – 2	Porto	Funchal
19:45 WET	Zé Vítor 37'		Moraes 74'; González 88'	Stadium: Estádio da Madeira; Referee: Paulo Costa

17 December 2006 14	Porto	4 – 0	Paços de Ferreira	Porto
19:15 WET	Pepe 25', 67'; Postiga 43'; González 86'			Stadium: Estádio do Dragão; Attendance: 38,203; Referee: João Vilas Boas

14 January 2007 15	Desportivo das Aves	0 – 2	Porto	Vila das Aves
19:15 WET			González 8'; Quaresma 90'	Stadium: Estádio do CD das Aves; Referee: Hélio Santos

26 January 2007 16	União de Leiria	1 – 0	Porto	Leiria
20:30 WET	Tixier 70'			Stadium: Estádio Dr. Magalhães Pessoa; Attendance: 3,385; Referee: Elmano Santos

3 February 2007 17	Porto	0 – 1	Estrela da Amadora	Porto
19:15 WET			Anselmo 90'	Stadium: Estádio do Dragão; Attendance: 26,309; Referee: Jorge Sousa

16 February 2007 18	Porto	4 – 0	Naval 1º de Maio	Porto
20:30 WET	López 19', 47'; González 35'; Adriano 90'			Stadium: Estádio do Dragão; Attendance: 29,309; Referee: Nuno Almeida

25 February 2007 19	Beira-Mar	0 – 5	Porto	Aveiro
20:15 WET			López 17'; González 70'; Meireles 74'; Alan 76'; Adriano 87' (pen.)	Stadium: Estádio Municipal de Aveiro; Attendance: 14,540; Referee: Bruno Paixão

3 March 2007 20	Porto	1 – 0	Braga	Porto
19:15 WET	Adriano 8'			Stadium: Estádio do Dragão; Attendance: 41,228; Referee: Olegário Benquerença

11 March 2007 21	Marítimo	1 – 2	Porto	Funchal
19:15 WET	Douglas 85'		Adriano 17'; Meireles 27'	Stadium: Estádio dos Barreiros; Referee: João Ferreira

17 March 2007 22	Porto	0 – 1	Sporting CP	Porto
20:30 WET			Tello 71'	Stadium: Estádio do Dragão; Attendance: 49,428; Referee: Pedro Henriques

1 April 2007 23	Benfica	1 – 1	Porto	Lisbon
20:15 WET	González 84' (o.g.)		Pepe 41'	Stadium: Estádio da Luz; Attendance: 62,756; Referee: Pedro Proença

6 April 2007 24	Porto	5 – 1	Vitória de Setúbal	Porto
20:00 WET	Jorginho 4'; Adriano 16', 35'; Postiga 20'; Anderson 76'		B. Ribeiro 61'	Stadium: Estádio do Dragão; Attendance: 40,120; Referee: Pedro Henriques

14 April 2007 25	Académica de Coimbra	1 – 2	Porto	Coimbra
21:15 WET	Lino 76' (pen.)		Alves 42'; Adriano 70'	Stadium: Estádio Cidade de Coimbra; Attendance: 16,115; Referee: Carlos Xistra

22 April 2007 26	Porto	3 – 1	Belenenses	Porto
19:15 WET	Adriano 9'; González 45' (pen.); Alves 85'		Nivaldo 49'	Stadium: Estádio do Dragão; Attendance: 44,728; Referee: João Vilas Boas

28 April 2007 27	Boavista	2 – 1	Porto	Porto
21:15 WET	R. Silva 14'; Zé Manel 50'		González 72' (pen.)	Stadium: Estádio do Bessa; Referee: Jorge Sousa

5 May 2007 28	Porto	2 – 0	Nacional	Porto
19:15 WET	Anderson 67'; Fucile 88'			Stadium: Estádio do Dragão; Attendance: 39,628; Referee: Cosme Machado

13 May 2007 29	Paços de Ferreira	1 – 1	Porto	Paços de Ferreira
19:15 WET	Antunes 21'		Adriano 76'	Stadium: Estádio da Mata Real; Referee: Paulo Paraty

20 May 2007 30	Porto	4 – 1	Desportivo das Aves	Porto
19:15 WET	Adriano 26'; López 52', 89'; J. Ribeiro 59' (o.g.)		Moreira 33'	Stadium: Estádio do Dragão; Attendance: 50,429; Referee: Olegário Benquerença

=== Taça de Portugal ===
7 January 2007 4	Porto	0 – 1	Atlético CP	Estádio do Dragão, Porto
15:00 WEST			Costa 59'	Attendance: 30,126; Referee: Paulo Pereira

=== UEFA Champions League ===
==== Group stage ====
Pos	Team	Pld	W	D	L	GF	GA	GD	Pts	Qualification
1	(England) Arsenal	6	3	2	1	7	3	+4	11	Advance to knockout stage
2	(Portugal) Porto	6	3	2	1	9	4	+5	11	Advance to knockout stage
3	(Russia) CSKA Moscow	6	2	2	2	4	5	−1	8	Transfer to UEFA Cup
4	(Germany) Hamburger SV	6	1	0	5	7	15	−8	3	

Source: RSSSF

13 September 2006 1	Porto (Portugal)	0 – 0	(Russia) CSKA Moscow	Porto
20:45 CET				Stadium: Estádio do Dragão; Referee: Tom Henning Øvrebø

26 September 2006 2	Arsenal (England)	2 – 0	(Portugal) Porto	London
20:45 CET	Henry 38'; Hleb 48'			Stadium: Emirates Stadium; Referee: Stefano Farina

17 October 2006 3	Porto (Portugal)	4 – 1	(Germany) Hamburger SV	Porto
20:45 CET	López 14', 81'; González 45' (pen.); Postiga 69'		Trochowski 89'	Stadium: Estádio do Dragão; Referee: Alain Hamer

1 November 2006 4	Hamburger SV (Germany)	1 – 3	(Portugal) Porto	Hamburg
20:45 CET	Van der Vaart 63'		González 44'; López 61'; Moraes 87'	Stadium: Volksparkstadion; Referee: Laurent Duhamel

21 November 2006 6	CSKA Moscow (Russia)	0 – 2	(Portugal) Porto	Moscow
20:45 CET			Quaresma 2'; González 61'	Stadium: Lokomotiv Stadium; Referee: Kyros Vassaras

6 December 2006 6	Porto (Portugal)	0 – 0	(England) Arsenal	Porto
20:45 CET				Stadium: Estádio do Dragão; Referee: Markus Merk

==== First knockout round ====
21 February 2007 First leg	Porto (Portugal)	1 – 1	(England) Chelsea	Porto
20:45 CET	Meireles 12'		Shevchenko 16'	Stadium: Estádio do Dragão; Attendance: 49,000; Referee: Massimo Busacca

6 March 2007 Second leg	Chelsea (England)	2 – 1 (3 – 2 agg.)	(Portugal) Porto	London
20:45 CET	Robben 48'; Ballack 79'		Quaresma 15'	Stadium: Stamford Bridge; Attendance: 39,041; Referee: Massimo Busacca

== Statistics ==
=== Appearances and goals ===
As of the end of the 2006–07 season.

No.	Pos	Nat	Player	Total		Primeira Liga		Taça de Portugal		Supertaça		Europe	
No.	Pos	Nat	Player	Apps	Goals	Apps	Goals	Apps	Goals	Apps	Goals	Apps	Goals
Goalkeepers
1	GK	(Brazil) BRA	Helton	39	0	30	0	0	0	1	0	8	0
24	GK	(Portugal) POR	Paulo Ribeiro	0	0	0	0	0	0	0	0	0	0
99	GK	(Portugal) POR	Vítor Baía	2	0	1	0	1	0	0	0	0	0
Defenders
2	DF	(Portugal) POR	Ricardo Costa	11	0	8	0	1	0	0	0	2	0
3	DF	(Brazil) BRA	Pepe	34	4	25	4	0	0	1	0	8	0
4	DF	(Portugal) POR	Pedro Emanuel	0	0	0	0	0	0	0	0	0	0
5	DF	(Slovakia) SVK	Marek Čech	29	1	22	1	1	0	1	0	5	0
12	DF	(Portugal) POR	José Bosingwa	32	0	25	0	0	0	1	0	6	0
13	DF	(Uruguay) URU	Jorge Fucile	25	1	18	1	1	0	0	0	6	0
14	DF	(Portugal) POR	Bruno Alves	36	2	28	2	0	0	0	0	8	0
15	DF	(Brazil) BRA	Ezequias	2	0	1	0	0	0	0	0	1	0
25	DF	(Argentina) ARG	Lucas Mareque	4	0	4	0	0	0	0	0	0	0
26	DF	(Portugal) POR	João Paulo	4	0	3	0	1	0	0	0	0	0
Midfielders
6	MF	(Brazil) BRA	Ibson	17	0	13	0	1	0	1	0	2	0
8	MF	(Argentina) ARG	Lucho González	38	12	30	9	0	0	0	0	8	3
10	MF	(Brazil) BRA	Anderson	19	3	15	2	0	0	1	1	3	0
16	MF	(Portugal) POR	Raul Meireles	34	4	25	3	1	0	1	0	7	1
18	MF	(Brazil) BRA	Paulo Assunção	31	0	22	0	1	0	1	0	7	0
31	MF	(Portugal) POR	Diogo Valente	1	0	1	0	0	0	0	0	0	0
35	MF	(Portugal) POR	André Castro	0	0	0	0	0	0	0	0	0	0
Forwards
7	MF	(Portugal) POR	Ricardo Quaresma	36	8	26	6	1	0	1	0	8	2
9	FW	(Argentina) ARG	Lisandro López	35	11	25	8	1	0	1	0	8	3
11	FW	(Morocco) MAR	Tarik Sektioui	5	1	4	1	0	0	0	0	1	0
17	FW	(Portugal) POR	Vieirinha	11	1	8	0	1	0	1	1	1	0
19	FW	(Croatia) CRO	Tomislav Šokota	1	0	1	0	0	0	0	0	0	0
20	FW	(Brazil) BRA	Jorginho	20	1	16	1	0	0	1	0	3	0
21	FW	(Brazil) BRA	Alan	12	1	8	1	1	0	1	0	2	0
22	FW	(Colombia) COL	Wason Rentería	6	0	6	0	0	0	0	0	0	0
23	FW	(Portugal) POR	Hélder Postiga	31	11	24	10	0	0	0	0	7	1
28	FW	(Brazil) BRA	Adriano	24	12	18	11	1	0	1	1	4	0
29	FW	(Brazil) BRA	Bruno Moraes	19	3	12	2	1	0	0	0	6	1

=== Clean sheets ===
As of the end of the 2006–07 season.

Rnk	Pos	No.	Player	Primeira Liga	Taça de Portugal	Supertaça	Champions League	Total
1	GK	1	(Brazil) Helton	13	0	1	3	17
2	GK	99	(Portugal) Vítor Baía	1	0	0	0	1
TOTALS				14	0	1	3	18

=== Disciplinary record ===
As of the end of the 2006–07 season.

Rnk	Pos.	No.	Player	Primeira Liga			Taça de Portugal			Supertaça			Europe			Total		
Rnk	Pos.	No.	Player	Booked	(yellow card) (yellow-red card)	Sent off (straight red)	Booked	(yellow card) (yellow-red card)	Sent off (straight red)	Booked	(yellow card) (yellow-red card)	Sent off (straight red)	Booked	(yellow card) (yellow-red card)	Sent off (straight red)	Booked	(yellow card) (yellow-red card)	Sent off (straight red)
1	MF	18	(Brazil) Paulo Assunção	9	0	0	0	0	0	1	0	0	1	0	0	11	0	0
2	DF	3	(Brazil) Pepe	6	0	0	0	0	0	0	0	0	2	0	0	8	0	0
3	DF	14	(Portugal) Bruno Alves	6	0	0	0	0	0	0	0	0	1	0	0	7	0	0
4	DF	12	(Portugal) José Bosingwa	6	0	0	0	0	0	0	0	0	0	0	0	6	0	0
5	FW	7	(Portugal) Ricardo Quaresma	5	0	1	0	0	0	1	0	0	2	0	0	8	0	1
6	MF	16	(Portugal) Raul Meireles	4	0	0	0	0	0	0	0	0	1	0	0	5	0	0
7	DF	5	(Slovakia) Marek Čech	4	0	0	0	0	0	0	0	0	0	0	0	4	0	0
7	MF	8	(Argentina) Lucho González	4	0	0	0	0	0	0	0	0	0	0	0	4	0	0
7	FW	9	(Argentina) Lisandro López	4	0	0	0	0	0	0	0	0	0	0	0	4	0	0
7	FW	20	(Brazil) Jorginho	4	0	0	0	0	0	0	0	0	0	0	0	4	0	0
11	DF	13	(Uruguay) Jorge Fucile	3	0	0	0	0	0	0	0	0	2	0	0	5	0	0
12	FW	23	(Portugal) Hélder Postiga	3	0	0	0	0	0	0	0	0	0	0	0	3	0	0
13	GK	1	(Brazil) Helton	2	0	0	0	0	0	0	0	0	0	0	0	2	0	0
13	FW	28	(Brazil) Adriano	2	0	0	0	0	0	0	0	0	0	0	0	2	0	0
15	DF	2	(Portugal) Ricardo Costa	0	0	0	0	0	0	0	0	0	1	0	0	1	0	0
15	MF	6	(Brazil) Ibson	1	0	0	0	0	0	0	0	0	0	0	0	1	0	0
15	MF	10	(Brazil) Anderson	1	0	0	0	0	0	0	0	0	0	0	0	1	0	0
15	DF	25	(Argentina) Lucas Mareque	1	0	0	0	0	0	0	0	0	0	0	0	1	0	0
15	DF	26	(Portugal) João Paulo	0	0	0	1	0	0	0	0	0	0	0	0	1	0	0
15	MF	31	(Portugal) Diogo Valente	1	0	0	0	0	0	0	0	0	0	0	0	1	0	0
TOTALS				60	0	1	1	0	0	2	0	0	10	0	0	73	0	1

=== Overview ===
As of the end of the 2006–07 season.

Games played	40 (30 Primeira Liga, 1 Taça de Portugal, 8 UEFA Champions League, 1 Supertaça Cândido de Oliveira)
Games won	26 (22 Primeira Liga, 3 UEFA Champions League, 1 Supertaça Cândido de Oliveira)
Games drawn	6 (3 Primeira Liga, 3 UEFA Champions League)
Games lost	8 (5 Primeira Liga, 1 Taça de Portugal, 2 UEFA Champions League)
Goals scored	79 (65 Primeira Liga, 11 UEFA Champions League, 3 Supertaça Cândido de Oliveira)
Goals conceded	28 (20 Primeira Liga, 1 Taça de Portugal, 7 UEFA Champions League)
Goal difference	+51 (+45 Primeira Liga, -1 Taça de Portugal, +4 UEFA Champions League, +3 Supertaça Cândido de Oliveira)
Clean sheets	17 (13 Primeira Liga, 1 Supertaça Cândido de Oliveira, 3 UEFA Champions League)
Yellow cards	73 (60 Primeira Liga, 1 Taça de Portugal, 10 UEFA Champions League, 2 Supertaça Cândido de Oliveira)
Red cards	1 (1 Primeira Liga)
Worst discipline	Paulo Assunção (11 (yellow card) )
Best result(s)	W 5 – 0 (A) v Beira-Mar – Primeira Liga – 25 February 2007
Worst result(s)	L 0 – 2 (A) v Arsenal – UEFA Champions League – 26 September 2006
Most Appearances	Helton (39 appearances)
Top scorer(s)	Adriano & Lucho González (22 goals)
