= Marco Tábuas =

Portuguese footballer (born 1976)

Personal information
- Full name: Marco António Miranda Tábuas
- Date of birth: 29 October 1976 (age 50)
- Place of birth: Moita, Portugal
- Height: 1.78 m (5 ft 10 in)
- Position: Goalkeeper

Team information
- Current team: Fabril Barreiro (assistant)

Youth career
- 1987–1988: Beira Mar Gaiense
- 1988–1989: Marítimo Rosarense
- 1989–1995: Vitória Setúbal

Senior career*
Years	Team	Apps	(Gls)
1995–2008	Vitória Setúbal	134	(0)
1996–1997	→ Desportivo Beja (loan)	11	(0)
2008–2009	Torreense	27	(0)
2009–2010	Aljustrelense	15	(0)
Total		187	(0)

Managerial career
- 2013–2014: Vitória de Sernache
- 2014–2015: Gouveia
- 2015–2016: Eléctrico
- 2017–2018: Cova da Piedade
- 2022–2023: Olímpico do Montijo
- * Club domestic league appearances and goals

Marco António Miranda Tábuas (born 29 October 1976) is a Portuguese former professional footballer who played as a goalkeeper.

He began his career at Vitória Setúbal and went on to make 156 first-team appearances (of which 110 were in the Primeira Liga) for the club after making his debut in October 1997. He was loaned out to Desportivo Beja for the 1996–97 season, where he made 12 appearances. He was promoted twice out of the Segunda Liga with Vitória Setúbal, in 2000–01 and 2003–04, and was an unused substitute as they won the Taça de Portugal in 2005, and finished as runners-up in the Supertaça Cândido de Oliveira in 2005 and the Taça de Portugal in 2006; he also played in the 2006 Supertaça Cândido de Oliveira, as Vitória Setúbal lost 3–0 to Porto. He left the club in 2008 and went on to spend the 2008–09 season with Torreense and the 2009–10 season with Aljustrelense in the Segunda Divisão. After retiring as a player, he became a goalkeeper coach. He has also managed Vitória de Sernache, Gouveia, Eléctrico, Cova da Piedade and Olímpico do Montijo.

== Playing career ==
Tábuas came through the youth system at Vitória Setúbal. He was loaned out to Desportivo Beja of the Segunda Divisão de Honra (second tier) for the 1996–97 season. He was sent off on his first-team debut on 13 October, after receiving two yellow cards in a 3–2 defeat to Varzim at the Estádio do Varzim SC. He went on to play a total of 12 games for Beja. He made his first-team debut for Vitória Setúbal on 26 October 1997, in a 4–2 defeat at Varzim in the fourth round of the Taça de Portugal. He made his Primeira Divisão (first tier) debut for the club on 20 September 1998, in a 1–1 draw with Beira-Mar at the Estádio Mário Duarte. He went on to play a total of 28 league and six cup games in the 1998–99 season.

He featured 27 times in the 1999–2000 relegation campaign and played once in the UEFA Cup, a 7–0 defeat to A.S. Roma at the Stadio Olimpico on 16 September. He played 21 league games in the 2000–01 season, as Vitória Setúbal won promotion at the first attempt after securing a third-place finish. However, he played only 11 times in the 2001–02 season and was sent off after receiving two yellow cards in a 3–2 win over Santa Clara on 14 April. He featured 19 times in the 2002–03 relegation campaign and was sent off for the third and final time in his career in a 2–0 defeat by Paços de Ferreira on 4 May; he was shown a red card on 73 minutes despite being an unused substitute. Vitória Setúbal again won promotion at the first attempt in 2003–04. However, Tábuas played only three league games as the club secured the second automatic promotion spot.

He played a total of 20 matches in the 2004–05 season, and was an unused substitute at the club won the Taça de Portugal with a 2–1 victory over league champions Benfica. He was also an unused substitute in the 2005 Supertaça Cândido de Oliveira at the Estádio Algarve, where Benfica achieved some revenge over Vitória Setúbal with a 1–0 victory. He was appointed as the club's second captain, and spoke in defence of the club after a financial crisis meant the players considered strike action after wages went unpaid at the Estádio do Bonfim for months on end. He played 11 games in the 2005–06 season, and was an unused substitute in the 2006 Taça de Portugal final at the Estádio Nacional, as Porto defeated Vitória Setúbal 1–0. He started the 2006 Supertaça Cândido de Oliveira match at the Estádio Dr. Magalhães Pessoa, as new signing Nikola Milojević was unable to secure a work permit in time; Vitória Setúbal were beaten 3–0 by Porto. He went on to feature in just four further matches in the 2006–07 and 2007–08 seasons, including a second appearance in the UEFA Cup, as Vitória Setúbal lost 3–0 at home to Heerenveen on 14 September 2006.

In July 2008, Tábuas was released by Vitória Setúbal and joined Torreense in the Segunda Divisão - Série D (third tier). He made 29 league and cup appearances in the 2008–09 campaign before he returned to Alentejo to play for Aljustrelense. He played 15 Segunda Divisão Zona Sul games in the 2009–10 season and announced his retirement at the end of the campaign.

== Coaching career ==
After retiring from football at the end of the 2009–10 season, Tábuas joined Spanish club AD Ceuta as goalkeeping coach under Portuguese coach João de Deus, with whom Tábuas had previously played for at Vitória Setúbal. Before the 2012–13 season started, Tábuas was hired as goalkeeping coach at Portuguese club Fabril Barreiro under manager Conhé. From September 2013 until January 2014, Tábuas was the manager of Vitória de Sernache. In April 2014, Tábuas became goalkeeping coach at Sertanense under João Sousa.

Tábuas coached at Gouveia from July 2014 to June 2015, and then at Eléctrico from July 2015 to April 2016. In July 2016, he was appointed as goalkeeping coach at English League One club Port Vale by Portuguese manager Bruno Ribeiro. He departed Vale Park after Ribeiro resigned in December 2016. In November 2017, Tábuas became goalkeeping coach at Cova da Piedade under the same manager, Bruno Ribeiro. In October 2018, Tábias once again became goalkeeping coach under Ribeiro, this time at Vitória Setúbal's U-19 team. Later he also acted as goalkeeping coach at the club's first team under Sandro Mendes's management.

In the 2020–21 and 2021–22 seasons, Tábuas served as assistant coach at Oriental Dragon FC. Prior to the 2022–23 season, Tábuas became assistant coach of Portuguese club Villa AC, under head coach Albert Meyong, who Tábuas had worked with at Vitoria. On 29 December 2022, he was hired as manager of Olímpico do Montijo. In his just over three months at the club before being sacked on 9 March 2023, Tábuas managed nine games, winning four, losing four and drawing one. In the 2023–24 season, Tábuas was back at Fabril Barreiro, acting as assistant coach.

== Career statistics ==
=== Playing statistics ===
Appearances and goals by club, season and competition
Club	Season	League			Taça de Portugal		Other		Total	
Club	Season	Division	Apps	Goals	Apps	Goals	Apps	Goals	Apps	Goals
Vitória Setúbal	1995–96	Segunda Divisão de Honra	0	0	0	0	0	0	0	0
Vitória Setúbal	1996–97	Primeira Divisão	0	0	0	0	0	0	0	0
Vitória Setúbal	1997–98	Primeira Divisão	0	0	1	0	0	0	1	0
Vitória Setúbal	1998–99	Primeira Divisão	28	0	6	0	0	0	34	0
Vitória Setúbal	1999–2000	Primeira Liga	24	0	2	0	1 (Note: Appearance in the UEFA Cup.)	0	27	0
Vitória Setúbal	2000–01	Segunda Liga	21	0	1	0	0	0	22	0
Vitória Setúbal	2001–02	Primeira Liga	10	0	1	0	0	0	11	0
Vitória Setúbal	2002–03	Primeira Liga	18	0	1	0	0	0	19	0
Vitória Setúbal	2003–04	Segunda Liga	3	0	4	0	0	0	7	0
Vitória Setúbal	2004–05	Primeira Liga	19	0	1	0	0	0	20	0
Vitória Setúbal	2005–06	Primeira Liga	8	0	2	0	0	0	10	0
Vitória Setúbal	2006–07	Primeira Liga	2	0	0	0	2 (Note: One appearance in the UEFA Cup and one appearance in the Supertaça Cândido de Oliveira.)	0	4	0
Vitória Setúbal	2007–08	Primeira Liga	1	0	0	0	0	0	1	0
Vitória Setúbal	Total		134	0	19	0	3	0	156	0
Desportivo Beja (loan)	1996–97	Segunda Divisão de Honra	11	0	1	0	0	0	12	0
Torreense	2008–09	Segunda Divisão - Série D	27	0	2	0	0	0	29	0
Aljustrelense	2009–10	Segunda Divisão Zona Sul	15	0	0	0	0	0	15	0
Career total			187	0	22	0	3	0	212	0

=== Managerial statistics ===
Managerial record by team and tenure
Team	From	To	Record					Ref
Team	From	To	P	W	D	L	Win %	Ref
Olímpico do Montijo	29 December 2022	9 March 2023	9	4	1	4	44.4	

== Honours ==
Vitória Setúbal

- Segunda Liga second-place promotion: 2003–04; third-place promotion: 2000–01
- Supertaça Cândido de Oliveira runner-up: 2005, 2006
- Taça de Portugal: 2005; runner-up: 2006
