= Auri (footballer) =

Brazilian footballer (born 1973)

Personal information
- Full name: Auri Dias Faustino
- Date of birth: 17 November 1973 (age 52)
- Place of birth: Nova Aurora, Brazil
- Height: 1.85 m (6 ft 1 in)
- Position: Centre back

Senior career*
Years	Team	Apps	(Gls)
1992–1997	Coritiba		
1997–2001	Vitória Guimarães	19	(0)
1998	→ Chaves (loan)	11	(0)
1999–2000	→ Gil Vicente (loan)	31	(2)
2001–2002	Chaves	31	(0)
2002–2003	Naval	33	(1)
2003–2009	Vitória Setúbal	164	(8)
2009–2010	Covilhã	30	(5)
Total		319	(16)
- * Club domestic league appearances and goals

Auri Dias Faustino (born 17 November 1973 in Nova Aurora, Paraná), known simply as Auri, is a Brazilian retired footballer who played as a central defender.

== Honours ==
Vitória Setúbal

- Taça de Portugal: 2004–05; Runner-up 2005–06
- Taça da Liga: 2007–08
- Supertaça Cândido de Oliveira: Runner-up 2005, 2006
