= Nova Aurora, Paraná =

Coordinates: 24°31′44″S 53°15′21″W

- Municipality
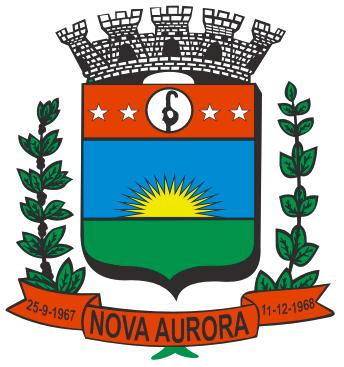
- Flag Coat of arms

- Country: Brazil
- Region: Southern
- State: Paraná
- Mesoregion: Oeste Paranaense
- Founded: September 25, 1967

Government
  - Mayor: Pedro Leandro Neto (2013-2016)

Area
  - Total: 183.017 sq mi (474.011 km^{2})
- Elevation: 1,710 ft (520 m)

Population (2020)
  - Total: 10,299
  - Density: 56.274/sq mi (21.727/km^{2})
- Time zone: UTC−3 (BRT)

Nova Aurora, Paraná is a municipality in the state of Paraná in the Southern Region of Brazil.

== See also ==
- List of municipalities in Paraná
