= Ibson =

Brazilian footballer (born 1983)

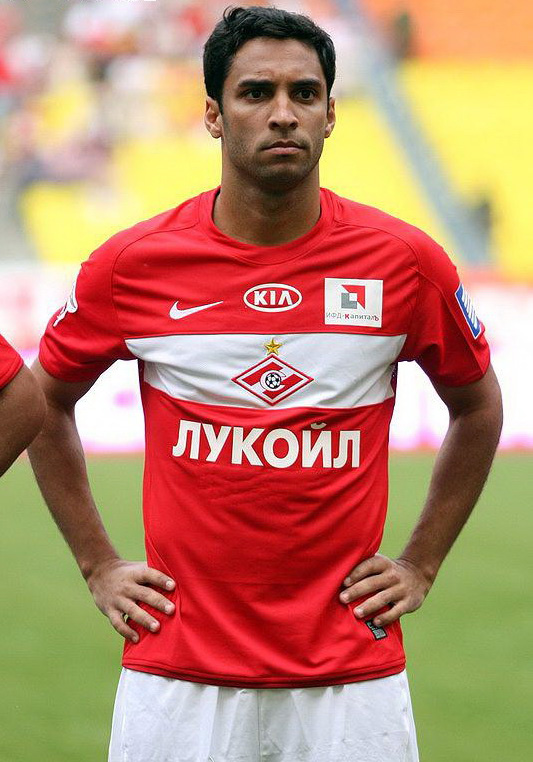
- Ibson before a game with Spartak in 2009

Personal information
- Full name: Ibson Barreto da Silva
- Date of birth: 7 November 1983 (age 43)
- Place of birth: São Gonçalo, Brazil
- Height: 1.77 m (5 ft 10 in)
- Position: Midfielder

Team information
- Current team: Amazonas (assistant)

Youth career
- 1992–2002: Flamengo

Senior career*
Years	Team	Apps	(Gls)
2003–2005	Flamengo	63	(7)
2005–2009	Porto	46	(2)
2007–2009	→ Flamengo (loan)	95	(22)
2009–2011	Spartak Moscow	44	(3)
2011–2012	Santos	38	(4)
2012–2013	Flamengo	46	(2)
2013–2014	Corinthians	21	(0)
2014–2015	Bologna	10	(0)
2014	→ Sport Recife (loan)	16	(0)
2015–2016	Minnesota United	49	(7)
2017–2018	Minnesota United	58	(4)
2019–2020	Tombense	41	(3)
2021	Amazonas	12	(1)
2021	Ipatinga	10	(0)
2022	Amazonas	10	(2)
2022	Nacional de Muriaé	7	(0)
Total		566	(57)

Managerial career
- 2023–: Amazonas (assistant)
- 2024: Amazonas (interim)
- * Club domestic league appearances and goals

Ibson Barreto da Silva (born 7 November 1983), simply known as Ibson, is a Brazilian football coach and former player who played as a central midfielder. He is the current assistant coach of Amazonas.

== Playing career ==
=== Flamengo ===
Born in São Gonçalo, Rio de Janeiro, Ibson arrived at Clube de Regatas do Flamengo in 1992, at the age of nine. He was promoted to the first team in the 2003 season and made his debut in a match against CR Vasco da Gama, totalling nine appearances in the Série A that year; his father, Laís Souza, eventually became a scout at the club.

In the following campaign, Ibson became one of the team's most important players: under the guidance of Abel Braga and playing alongside the likes of Felipe, Jean and Zinho, he won the Taça Guanabara and the Campeonato Carioca, and also finished as runner-up in the Copa do Brasil; that season, he scored six goals from 44 appearances.

Subsequently, some European clubs showed interest in Ibson and, in January 2005, just three games into the regional championship, he was transferred to FC Porto. Flamengo received many criticism about his transfer, most of it coming from the transfer values – around US$2,5 million. At the time, club directors said they cashed the money as his contract would run out at the end of the year, so they could have lost him for nothing.

=== Porto / Flamengo return ===
Ibson had a good start with Porto, quickly becoming a habitual first-choice. In his first complete season he won the Primeira Liga and the Taça de Portugal, appearing in 21 games all competitions combined (one goal) and adding the following year's Supertaça Cândido de Oliveira.

In 2006–07, however, Ibson lost his importance in the squad, also having some problems with manager Jesualdo Ferreira. He would return to Flamengo subsequently, being loaned in July 2007. He arrived with the side placed in relegation zone (18th), signing alongside Maxi Biancucchi and Fábio Luciano and helping to an incredible comeback as they finished third, the best performance since the title-winning season in 1992, which also secured a place in the 2008 edition of the Copa Libertadores; he scored six times in 22 matches and was also elected the league's best right midfielder, and the loan was then extended for a further year.

=== Journeyman ===
On 13 July 2009, Ibson was released by Porto and signed a three-year contract with FC Spartak Moscow, being sold for €4 million. He netted twice in 28 matches in the 2010 season, helping to a fourth place in the Russian Premier League.

Ibson represented five teams from 2011 to 2015, including former side Flamengo. On 23 February 2015, he joined Minnesota United FC from the North American Soccer League.

At the end of the 2018 season, 35-year-old Ibson was released by the TCF Bank Stadium-based club.

=== Later years ===
At the end of May 2019, Ibson was announced as a new player of Tombense. After leaving the club in the end of the 2020 season, he subsequently played for Amazonas (two stints), Ipatinga and Nacional de Muriaé, retiring with the latter in 2022.

== Coaching career ==
After retiring, Ibson returned to Amazonas on 26 April 2023, as a permanent assistant coach of the club. On 19 November 2024, he was named interim head coach for the last round of the 2024 Série B.

== Club statistics ==
Appearances and goals by club, season and competition
Club	Season	League			State league (Note: Includes Campeonato Carioca and Campeonato Paulista)		Cup (Note: Includes Copa do Brasil, Taça de Portugal, and US Open Cup)		Continental		Other		Total	
Club	Season	Division	Apps	Goals	Apps	Goals	Apps	Goals	Apps	Goals	Apps	Goals	Apps	Goals
Flamengo	2003	Série A	8	0	—		—		—		—		8	0
Flamengo	2004	Série A	42	6	12	1	10	1	2 (Note: Appearances in Copa Sudamericana)	2	—		66	10
Flamengo	2005	Série A	0	0	1	0	0	0	0	0	—		1	0
Flamengo	Total		50	6	13	1	10	1	2	2	—		75	10
Porto	2004–05	Primeira Liga	15	1	—		—		—		—		15	1
Porto	2005–06	Primeira Liga	18	1	—		4	0	3 (Note: Appearances in UEFA Champions League)	0	—		25	1
Porto	2006–07	Primeira Liga	13	0	—		1	0	2	0	1 (Note: Appearances in Supertaça Cândido de Oliveira)	0	17	0
Porto	Total		46	2	—		5	0	5	0	1	0	57	2
Flamengo (loan)	2007	Série A	22	6	—		—		—		—		22	6
Flamengo (loan)	2008	Série A	32	11	15	4	—		7 (Note: Appearances in Copa Libertadores)	0	—		54	15
Flamengo (loan)	2009	Série A	9	0	17	1	6	0	0	0	—		32	1
Flamengo (loan)	Total		63	17	32	5	6	0	7	0	—		108	22
Spartak Moscow	2009	Russian Premier League	6	0	—		1	0	—		—		7	0
Spartak Moscow	2010	Russian Premier League	28	2	—		0	0	6	2	—		34	4
Spartak Moscow	2011–12	Russian Premier League	10	1	—		3	1	4 (Note: Appearances in UEFA Europa League)	0	—		17	2
Spartak Moscow	Total		44	3	—		4	1	10	2	—		58	6
Santos	2011	Série A	19	0	—		—		—		2 (Note: Appearances in FIFA Club World Cup)	0	21	0
Santos	2012	Série A	0	0	19	4	—		8	0	—		27	4
Santos	Total		19	0	19	4	—		8	0	2	0	48	4
Flamengo	2012	Série A	33	1	—		—		—		—		33	1
Flamengo	2013	Série A	0	0	13	1	0	0	0	0	—		13	1
Flamengo	Total		33	1	13	1	0	0	0	0	—		46	1
Corinthians	2013	Série A	20	0	—		3	0	0	0	2 (Note: Appearances in Recopa Sudamericana)	0	25	0
Corinthians	2014	Série A	0	0	1	0	0	0	0	0	—		1	0
Corinthians	Total		20	0	1	0	3	0	0	0	2	0	26	0
Bologna	2013–14	Serie A	10	0	—		—		—		—		10	0
Sport Recife (loan)	2014	Série A	16	0	—		—		2	0	—		18	0
Minnesota United (NASL)	2015	NASL	26	6	—		1	0	—		—		27	6
Minnesota United (NASL)	2016	NASL	23	1	—		2	0	—		—		25	1
Minnesota United (NASL)	Total		49	7	—		3	0	—		—		52	7
Minnesota United	2017	MLS	31	0	—		1	0	—		—		32	0
Minnesota United	2018	MLS	27	4	—		0	0	—		—		27	4
Minnesota United	Total		58	4	—		1	0	—		—		59	4
Tombense	2019	Série C	12	0	—		—		—		—		12	0
Tombense	2020	Série C	16	1	13	2	—		—		—		29	3
Tombense	Total		28	1	13	2	—		—		—		41	3
Amazonas	2021	Amazonense	—		12	1	—		—		—		12	1
Ipatinga	2021	Mineiro Módulo II	—		10	0	—		—		—		10	0
Amazonas	2022	Série D	0	0	10	2	—		—		—		10	2
Nacional de Muriaé	2022	Mineiro Módulo II	—		7	0	—		—		—		7	0
Career total			436	41	130	16	32	2	34	4	5	0	637	62

according to FlaEstatística

== Honours ==
=== Club ===
Flamengo

- Campeonato Brasileiro Série A: 2009
- Taça Guanabara: 2004, 2008
- Taça Rio: 2009
- Campeonato Carioca: 2004, 2008, 2009

Porto

- Primeira Liga: 2005–06, 2006–07
- Taça de Portugal: 2005–06
- Supertaça Cândido de Oliveira: 2006

Santos

- Campeonato Paulista: 2012

Corinthians

- Recopa Sudamericana: 2013

=== Individual ===
- Campeonato Brasileiro Série A Team of the Year: 2007
