= Vítor Baía =

Portuguese footballer (born 1969)

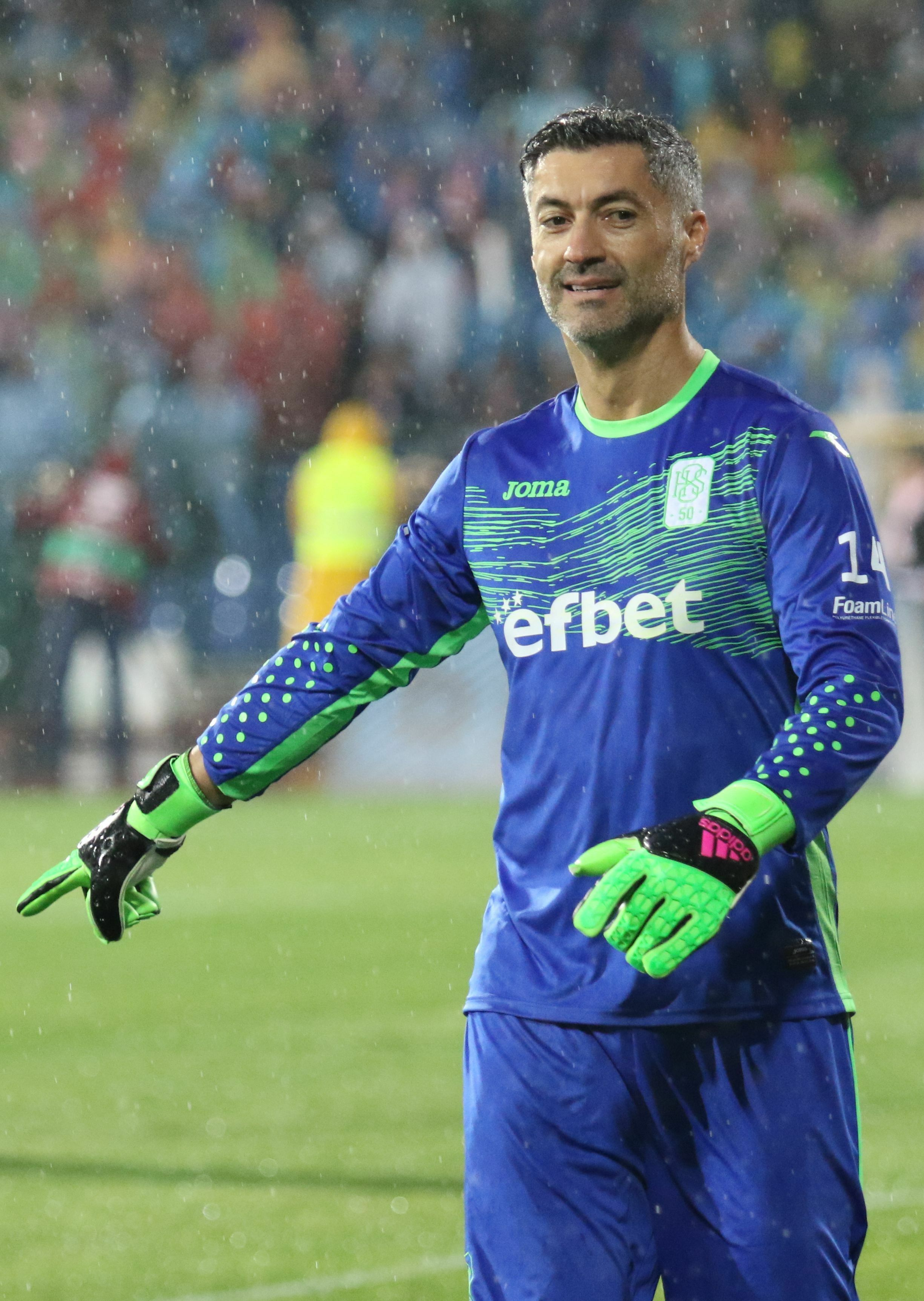
- Baía in 2016

Personal information
- Full name: Vítor Manuel Martins Baía
- Date of birth: 15 October 1969 (age 57)
- Place of birth: Vila Nova de Gaia, Portugal
- Height: 1.84 m (6 ft 0 in)
- Position: Goalkeeper

Youth career
- Académico Leça
- 1983–1988: Porto

Senior career*
| Years | Team | Apps | (Gls) |
| 1988–1996 | Porto | 246 | (0) |
| 1996–1999 | Barcelona | 39 | (0) |
| 1999 | → Porto (loan) | 16 | (0) |
| 1999–2007 | Porto | 144 | (0) |
| 2001 | Porto B | 2 | (0) |
| Total | | 447 | (0) |

International career
| 1989–1990 | Portugal U21 | 8 | (0) |
| 1990–2002 | Portugal | 80 | (0) |
- * Club domestic league appearances and goals

Vítor Manuel Martins Baía, OIH (Portuguese pronunciation: [ˈvitɔɾ βɐˈiɐ]; born 15 October 1969) is a Portuguese former professional footballer who played as a goalkeeper.

One of the most decorated players in his position in history, his career was intimately connected with Porto, which he started representing still in his teens, helping it to 26 titles and eventually remaining with the club in an ambassadorial role.

Also having played for Barcelona, Baía appeared with the Portugal national team in two European Championships and the 2002 World Cup.

== Club career ==
=== Porto ===
Born in Vila Nova de Gaia, Porto District, Baía joined Porto's youth ranks at 13 from also northern club Leça. In early 1989, he renounced to appear at the FIFA World Youth Championship, as he had relegated Pole Józef Młynarczyk to the bench and his club was still chasing the Primeira Liga title, which eventually eluded them (second place).

Baía made his first-team debut in a game against Vítoria de Guimarães, and did not lose his starting place for the following seven seasons, winning five leagues and two Taça de Portugal and conceding only 116 goals (16,5 goals per year). It was between 1994 and 1996 that he made his name as a world-class goalkeeper, being voted for the ESM Team of the Year after the 1994–95 season and being named in the IFFHS' World's Best Goalkeeper of the Year 1995 list, finishing sixth in the voting and improving to fifth in the following year; consequently, he was named in the Portugal squad for Euro 1996, being transferred after this tournament to Spain's Barcelona for the highest amount paid for a player in the position in the world.

=== Barcelona ===
While he only missed one La Liga match in his first season, as Barcelona finished second to Real Madrid, adding that campaign's UEFA Cup Winners' Cup, Baía also suffered from knee problems during his two-and-a-half-year spell.

Additionally, when Louis van Gaal took over at Barcelona from Bobby Robson, he was dropped from the team in favour of the manager's compatriot Ruud Hesp, being subsequently loaned in mid-season back to Porto, filling the position some said he had "haunted" since his departure.

=== Porto return ===
In my opinion, no country can afford not to call the best European goalkeeper to its team, but that happened to me.

— Vítor Baía, 17 December 2007

In January 1999, Baía returned to Porto to find the No. 1 jersey unavailable, so he chose No. 99 instead, with the sales of that number being a success as well as the club's game attendances, highly related to the player's return. When his career seemed back on track, he was injured again during the 1999–2000 season, needing a corrective surgery on his knee.

Baía returned to Barcelona in the summer of 2000, being immediately released and signing with Porto. After one year on the sidelines due to injury, he made his comeback in the 2001–02 campaign in a reserves match against Vila Real, on 26 November 2001. Sixteen days later, he made his competitive debut against Santa Clara in the cup; after a full recovery, he was included in the list for the 2002 World Cup.

Baía was in great shape again in 2002–03, helping his team to win the league title, the cup and the UEFA Cup, appearing in 11 of 13 matches in the latter competition, including the semi-finals against Lazio where he saved a penalty kick, and the final against Celtic. It would not be until the following campaign when he regained full fitness again, and he would have one of the most impressive years of his career, winning the UEFA Champions League and his seventh league trophy – in the former competition, he played all games and minutes as Porto beat Monaco in the final (3–0) and, consequently, he was selected as the UEFA Club Best Goalkeeper of the Year, being the first Portuguese goalkeeper to win this individual title. This was not, however, good enough for Euro 2004 selection, with Sporting CP's Ricardo being controversially preferred. Later, in 2007, in a FIFA.com interview, Baía said: "(...) It's kind of strange because I was voted as being the best goalkeeper in Europe in the 2003/04 season and a few days before the squad for UEFA EURO 2004 was announced I'd won the Portuguese championship and the UEFA Champions League and even then I wasn't called up"; at the end of the season he was named in the list for IFFHS' World's Best Goalkeeper of the Year 2004, finishing eighth in the voting while Ricardo ranked 19th.

At the start of 2005–06, under Dutch coach Co Adriaanse, Baía initially started the season but lost his status midway through it, being replaced by Brazilian Helton. Although he was a part of the squad that won Porto's second league in a row the following season the player, in the last year of his contract, made only one league start, on the final league matchday, a 4–1 home win against Aves which would be his 700th official appearance; upon retiring at nearly 38, on 14 June 2007, he became director of public relations with his main club, leaving the post in late July 2010. He and Italian Stefano Tacconi are the only goalkeepers in history to have won the three main UEFA club competitions.

== International career ==
Baía made his Portugal senior debut on 19 December 1990 in a 1–0 friendly win over the United States, at the age of 21. He went on to make 80 appearances for the national team until 2002, playing all the games at UEFA Euro 1996 and 2000 (except one in the latter, as they were already qualified) and in the 2002 FIFA World Cup. In Euro 2000, he stopped Arif Erdem's penalty in the 2–0 defeat of Turkey in the quarter-finals.

After the failure in the 2002 World Cup, coach António Oliveira was sacked when he refused to quit. Luiz Felipe Scolari was hired as his replacement and Baía, a stalwart for the past ten years with a record of caps in his position, was ditched.

== Personal life ==
In 2004, Baía founded a charity with his wife Alexandra Rodrigues de Almeida, which would bear his own name and would be dedicated to helping underprivileged children and troubled teens. Also that year, he would donate a pair of his autographed gloves to be included in the UEFA Jubilee time capsule, a collection of UEFA memorabilia that was sealed underground in September, only opened 50 years hence.

Baía published his autobiography entitled 99 – Vítor Baía in 2005. On 10 June 2008, he was made an Officer of the Ordem do Infante Dom Henrique by the president of Portugal, Aníbal Cavaco Silva.

In August 2015, EA Sports announced Baía as part of their FIFA 16 Ultimate Team Legends, along with eight other former footballers.

== Career statistics ==
=== Club ===
Appearances and goals by club, season and competition
| Club | Season | League | | | Cup | | Europe | | Other (Note: Includes Supertaça Cândido de Oliveira, UEFA Super Cup and Intercontinental Cup.) | | Total | |
| Club | Season | Division | Apps | Goals | Apps | Goals | Apps | Goals | Apps | Goals | Apps | Goals |
|---|---|---|---|---|---|---|---|---|---|---|---|---|
| Porto | 1987–88 | Primeira Liga | 0 | 0 | 0 | 0 | 0 | 0 | 0 | 0 | 0 | 0 |
| Porto | 1988–89 | Primeira Liga | 15 | 0 | 0 | 0 | 0 | 0 | 0 | 0 | 15 | 0 |
| Porto | 1989–90 | Primeira Liga | 34 | 0 | 0 | 0 | 6 | 0 | 0 | 0 | 40 | 0 |
| Porto | 1990–91 | Primeira Liga | 38 | 0 | 1 | 0 | 6 | 0 | 3 | 0 | 47 | 0 |
| Porto | 1991–92 | Primeira Liga | 34 | 0 | 1 | 0 | 4 | 0 | 2 | 0 | 41 | 0 |
| Porto | 1992–93 | Primeira Liga | 34 | 0 | 2 | 0 | 10 | 0 | 2 | 0 | 48 | 0 |
| Porto | 1993–94 | Primeira Liga | 32 | 0 | 2 | 0 | 11 | 0 | 3 | 0 | 48 | 0 |
| Porto | 1994–95 | Primeira Liga | 33 | 0 | 0 | 0 | 6 | 0 | 3 | 0 | 42 | 0 |
| Porto | 1995–96 | Primeira Liga | 26 | 0 | 0 | 0 | 6 | 0 | 1 | 0 | 33 | 0 |
| Porto | Total | | 246 | 0 | 6 | 0 | 49 | 0 | 14 | 0 | 315 | 0 |
| Barcelona | 1996–97 | La Liga | 37 | 0 | 1 | 0 | 8 | 0 | 1 | 0 | 47 | 0 |
| Barcelona | 1997–98 | La Liga | 2 | 0 | 0 | 0 | 1 | 0 | 0 | 0 | 3 | 0 |
| Barcelona | Total | | 39 | 0 | 1 | 0 | 9 | 0 | 1 | 0 | 50 | 0 |
| Porto | 1998–99 | Primeira Liga | 16 | 0 | 0 | 0 | 0 | 0 | 0 | 0 | 16 | 0 |
| Porto | 1999–2000 | Primeira Liga | 15 | 0 | 1 | 0 | 9 | 0 | 2 | 0 | 27 | 0 |
| Porto | 2000–01 | Primeira Liga | 0 | 0 | 0 | 0 | 0 | 0 | 0 | 0 | 0 | 0 |
| Porto | 2001–02 | Primeira Liga | 17 | 0 | 0 | 0 | 2 | 0 | 0 | 0 | 19 | 0 |
| Porto | 2002–03 | Primeira Liga | 25 | 0 | 1 | 0 | 11 | 0 | 0 | 0 | 31 | 0 |
| Porto | 2003–04 | Primeira Liga | 31 | 0 | 0 | 0 | 13 | 0 | 1 | 0 | 45 | 0 |
| Porto | 2004–05 | Primeira Liga | 31 | 0 | 0 | 0 | 6 | 0 | 3 | 0 | 40 | 0 |
| Porto | 2005–06 | Primeira Liga | 24 | 0 | 1 | 0 | 6 | 0 | 0 | 0 | 31 | 0 |
| Porto | 2006–07 | Primeira Liga | 1 | 0 | 0 | 0 | 0 | 0 | 0 | 0 | 1 | 0 |
| Porto | Total | | 160 | 0 | 3 | 0 | 47 | 0 | 6 | 0 | 210 | 0 |
| Career total | | | 445 | 0 | 10 | 0 | 105 | 0 | 21 | 0 | 575 | 0 |

=== International ===
Appearances and goals by national team and year
| National team | Year | Apps | Goals |
|---|---|---|---|
| Portugal | 1990 | 1 | 0 |
| Portugal | 1991 | 9 | 0 |
| Portugal | 1992 | 7 | 0 |
| Portugal | 1993 | 10 | 0 |
| Portugal | 1994 | 5 | 0 |
| Portugal | 1995 | 6 | 0 |
| Portugal | 1996 | 12 | 0 |
| Portugal | 1997 | 4 | 0 |
| Portugal | 1998 | 6 | 0 |
| Portugal | 1999 | 9 | 0 |
| Portugal | 2000 | 6 | 0 |
| Portugal | 2001 | 0 | 0 |
| Portugal | 2002 | 5 | 0 |
| Total | | 80 | 0 |

== Honours ==
Porto

- Primeira Liga: 1989–90, 1991–92, 1992–93, 1994–95, 1995–96, 1998–99, 2002–03, 2003–04, 2005–06, 2006–07
- Taca de Portugal: 1990–91, 1993–94, 1999–2000, 2002–03, 2005–06
- Supertaça Cândido de Oliveira: 1990, 1991, 1993, 1994, 1999, 2003, 2004, 2006
- UEFA Champions League: 2003–04
- UEFA Cup: 2002–03
- Intercontinental Cup: 2004

Barcelona

- La Liga: 1997–98
- Copa del Rey: 1996–97, 1997–98
- Supercopa de España: 1996
- UEFA Cup Winners' Cup: 1996–97

Individual

- Portuguese Footballer of the Year: 1989, 1991
- Portuguese Golden Ball: 1992
- ESM Team of the Year: 1994–95
- UEFA Club Best Goalkeeper of the Year: 2003–04
- Best European Goalkeeper: 2004

Orders

- Officer of the Order of Prince Henry

== See also ==
- List of players to have won the three main European club competitions
