= José Bosingwa =

Portuguese footballer (born 1982)

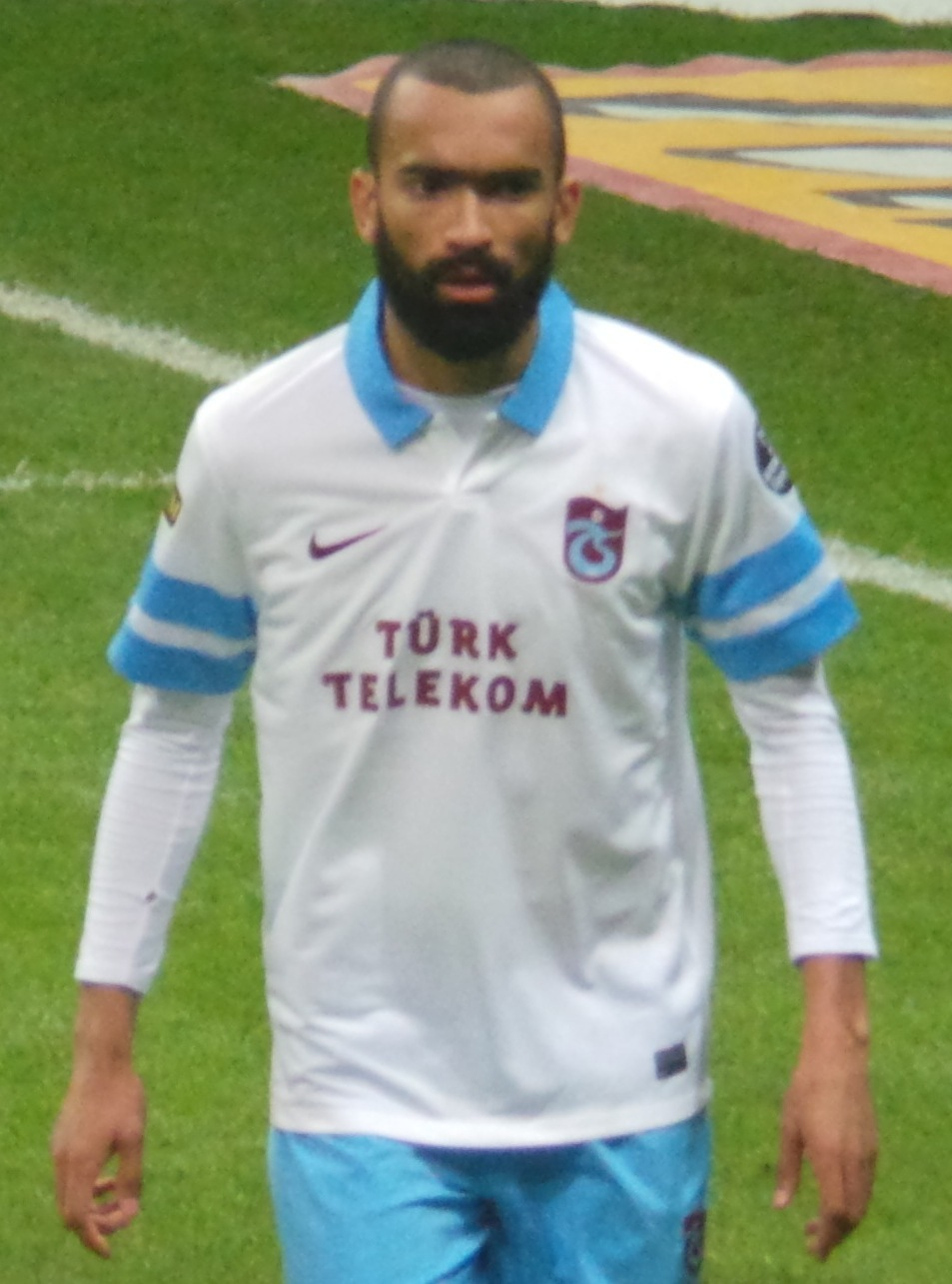
- Bosingwa playing for Trabzonspor in 2013

Personal information
- Full name: José Bosingwa da Silva
- Date of birth: 24 August 1982 (age 44)
- Place of birth: Mbandaka, Zaire
- Height: 1.83 m (6 ft 0 in)
- Position: Right-back

Youth career
- 1996–1997: Fornos de Algodres
- 1997–2000: Boavista

Senior career*
| Years | Team | Apps | (Gls) |
| 2000–2003 | Boavista | 41 | (0) |
| 2000–2001 | → Freamunde (loan) | 11 | (0) |
| 2003–2008 | Porto | 107 | (3) |
| 2008–2012 | Chelsea | 89 | (3) |
| 2012–2013 | Queens Park Rangers | 23 | (0) |
| 2013–2015 | Trabzonspor | 51 | (0) |
| 2016 | Trabzonspor | 12 | (0) |
| Total | | 334 | (6) |

International career
| 2003–2004 | Portugal U21 | 18 | (0) |
| 2007–2015 | Portugal | 27 | (0) |
Medal record
Men's football
Representing Portugal
UEFA European Under-21 Championship
| Third place | 2004 Germany |
- * Club domestic league appearances and goals

José Bosingwa da Silva (born 24 August 1982) is a former professional footballer who played as a right-back.

He spent most of his career with Porto and Chelsea, winning 13 major honours including the UEFA Champions League with both clubs, 2004 with the former and 2012 with the latter. In his country's Primeira Liga, he also appeared for Boavista.

Bosingwa was born in Zaire. A Portugal international since 2007, he represented the nation at Euro 2008 and the 2004 Summer Olympics, earning a total of 27 caps.

== Club career ==
=== Early life and career ===
Born in Mbandaka, Zaire to a Portuguese father and a Congolese mother, Bosingwa moved with his parents at a very young age to Seia in the Portuguese hinterland, in the Guarda District. He was the youngest of the couple's ten children.

Bosingwa was picked as a youth to play for Boavista FC, making his professional debut on loan to S.C. Freamunde in the Segunda Liga and appearing sparingly as the northern club finished last. He started his career as a midfielder.

=== Porto ===
After two full seasons with Boavista, Bosingwa signed with neighbouring FC Porto – coached by José Mourinho – for 2003–04. He was used sparingly in his first year, playing in only 13 Primeira Liga games; he made his UEFA Champions League debut on 16 September 2003 in a 1–1 away draw against FK Partizan, appearing in a further seven matches in the club's victorious campaign.

Fully established as a right-back and Porto's first-choice since 2004–05, after the departures of Paulo Ferreira and veteran Carlos Secretário, Bosingwa was a vital element in the team's conquest of another three league titles in four years. The campaign ended on a sour note as, in May, he was at the wheel of his jeep when excess speed and wet road conditions led to a serious accident, with the vehicle skidding off the motorway and rolling down an embankment before bursting into flames. Four other footballers travelled alongside him, including Boavista player Nélson. All escaped alive, but one of them, Sandro Luís (player of modest Grupo Desportivo os Minhocas), had to have his left foot amputated as a result of the accident, which took place in Valongo; years later, Bosingwa was made to pay €175.000 in compensation.

=== Chelsea ===
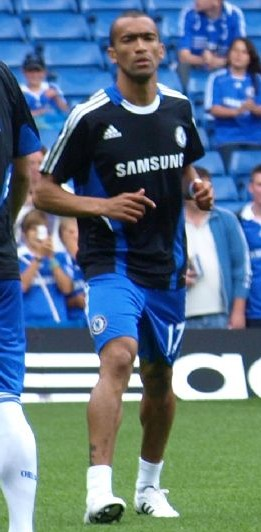
Bosingwa training with Chelsea in 2008

On 11 May 2008, Porto announced that Bosingwa had come to verbal agreements with Chelsea for €20.6 million (£16.3 million), with 20% of the transfer fee going to a third party called International Football – Gestão e Assessoria de Carreiras. He put pen to paper on a three-year deal and joined the London club after Euro 2008, along with Portugal national team boss Luiz Felipe Scolari and fellow international Deco; on 16 July he was officially presented with the number 16, but switched to No. 17 after exchanging with Scott Sinclair.

Bosingwa made his Premier League debut for the Blues on 17 August 2008, starting in a 4–0 home win against Portsmouth. His first Champions League appearance came the next month, against FC Girondins de Bordeaux (same venue, same result). He scored his first goal for them against Stoke City on 27 September, adding a second with a stunning left-foot attempt against West Bromwich Albion, scoring from 25 yards in a 3–0 away win.

On 1 February 2009, Bosingwa was involved in an incident on the field where he stamped Liverpool player Yossi Benayoun directly in the back, without making any attempt to play the ball. Although referee Mike Riley did not see it, assistant Mo Matadar would later claim to have seen the incident, signalling a foul at the time but subsequently awarding Chelsea a throw-in; in the days following the match, the Football Association claimed that FIFA regulations prevented them from imposing disciplinary sanctions, as no booking or sending off was issued.

Bosingwa was banned for three European matches as a result of comments he made about the refereeing of the Champions League semi-finals second leg clash against FC Barcelona (6 May 2009, 1–1 draw in England) on Portuguese television. He stated "I don't know whether he's a referee or a thief", but later apologised for his choice of words. The ban was later reduced to two games on appeal.

On 19 June 2009, FC Bayern Munich chairman Karl-Heinz Rummenigge conceded defeat in his club's attempt to sign Bosingwa, who remained at Stamford Bridge. He sustained a knee injury in October, being rendered unavailable for the rest of the season (the team won the title, but under league rules he had not made sufficient appearances for a medal). Chelsea announced in early March that he required further surgery, ruling him out of the 2010 FIFA World Cup.

On 16 October 2010, exactly one year after his injury, Bosingwa returned to action against the same opponent, Aston Villa playing the last 15 minutes in a 0–0 away draw at Villa Park after replacing compatriot Ferreira in the second half– both were relegated to the bench by Branislav Ivanović.

In the 2011–12 season, following the appointment of countryman André Villas-Boas as manager, Bosingwa returned to the starting lineup. On 27 August 2011, he scored his first goal in three years with a 25-yard strike against Norwich City in a 3–1 home win.

On 23 October 2011, in a game against Queen's Park Rangers, Bosingwa was controversially sent off by referee Chris Foy following a challenge with Shaun Wright-Phillips, as Chelsea went on to lose 1–0 away, with Didier Drogba also being dismissed for foul play. In late November, he started in the Champions League group stage match at Bayer 04 Leverkusen as left-back, playing out of position to replace injured Ashley Cole in an eventual 2–1 defeat.

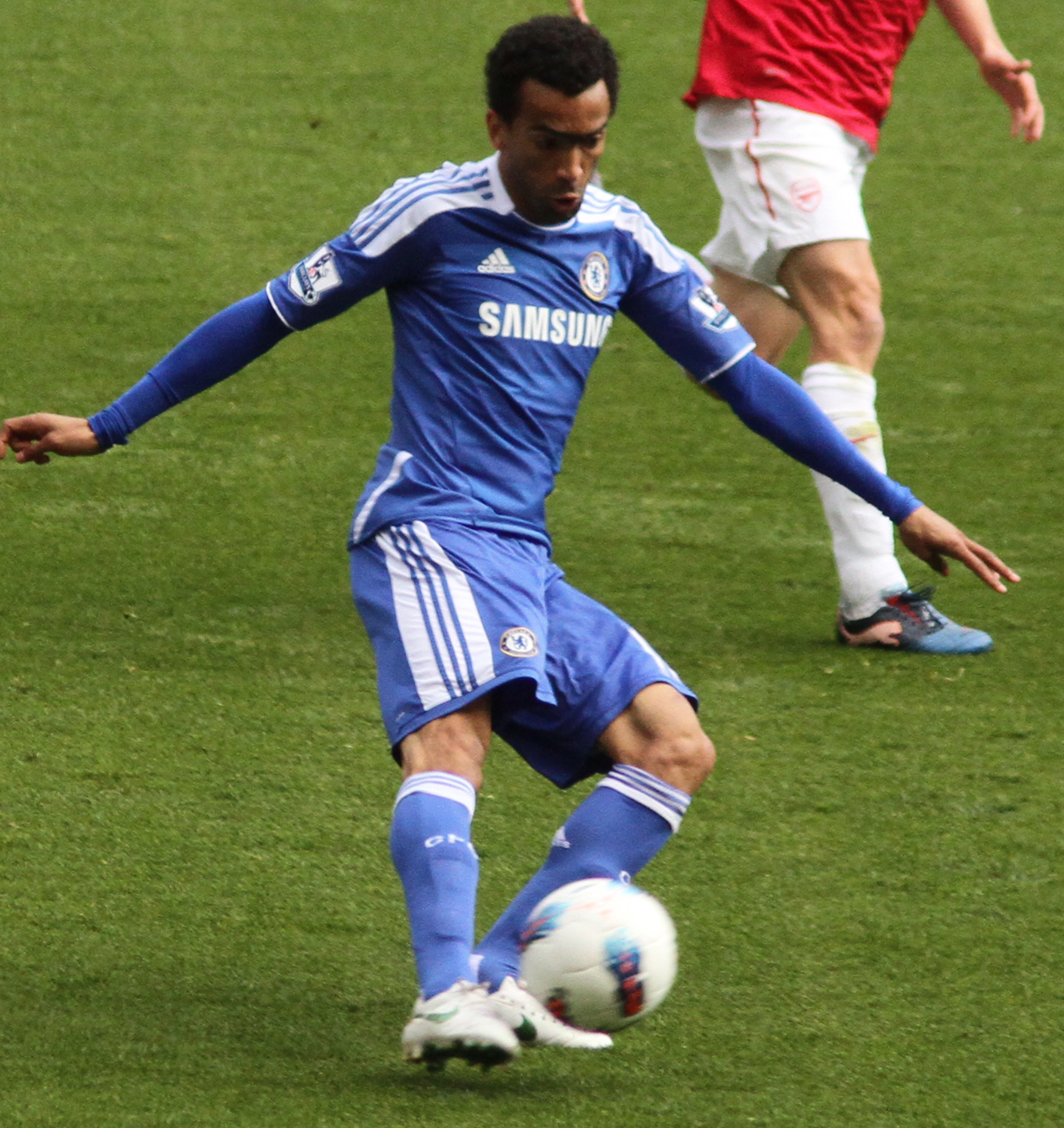
Bosingwa playing for Chelsea in 2012

On 24 April 2012, Bosingwa played a vital role in the match against Barcelona in the Champions League semi-finals: he replaced injured Gary Cahill after only 12 minutes, and helped his side record a 2–2 draw at the Camp Nou and a 3–2 aggregate win; for most of the match he had to play as centre-back, as John Terry was also sent off before half-time.

In his natural position, Bosingwa played the full 120 minutes in the Champions League final against FC Bayern Munich, as Chelsea won 4–3 on penalties and became the first club from London to win the tournament. With the back four being commended for their ability to keep the strong opposing forward line at bay, he himself received plaudits for his efforts against winger Franck Ribéry; Shortly after, however, along with teammates Drogba and Salomon Kalou, he was told he could leave once his contract expired the following month.

=== Queens Park Rangers ===
On 17 August 2012, Bosingwa signed a three-year deal with Queens Park Rangers. He scored his first goal for his new club on the 28th, netting against Walsall in a 3–0 home win in that season's Football League Cup.

Bosingwa was fined two weeks' wages in December 2012, for refusing to sit on the bench for a league game against Fulham. When QPR sealed their relegation in April 2013 after a 0–0 draw at Reading, he was seen on TV cameras to be smiling as he left the pitch, which angered teammate Joey Barton and fans alike; three months later, he left by mutual consent.

=== Trabzonspor ===
On 29 July 2013, Bosingwa signed a three-year contract with Trabzonspor in the Turkish Süper Lig, for a €2.1 million salary in the first two seasons and to €1.6 million in the last. He left in early November 2015 claiming unpaid wages but, in the following transfer window, returned and agreed to a five-month deal for €0.5 million plus €1,000 per match.

== International career ==
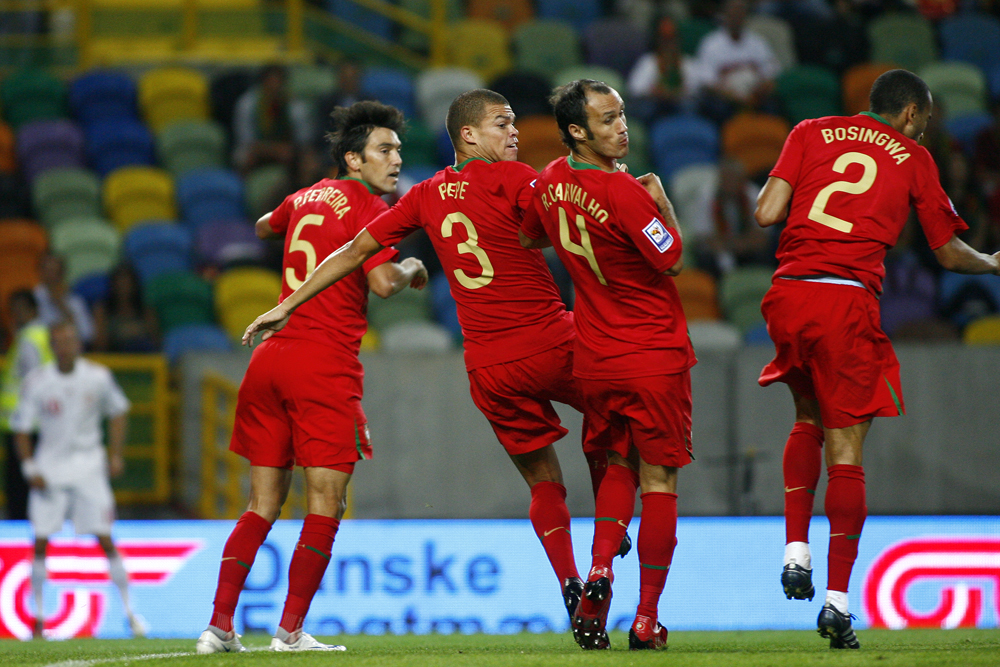
Bosingwa in action against Denmark in September 2008

Due to his consistent performances at club level, Bosingwa received his first call-up to the Portugal national team in May 2007, for a UEFA Euro 2008 qualifier away to Belgium, replacing Miguel in the second half of the 2–1 win on 2 June. Having overtaken the Valencia CF player as first-choice, he started all four matches in the final stages in Austria and Switzerland as the country exited in the quarter-finals, being included in the team of the tournament.

Bosingwa also represented Portugal at the 2004 Summer Olympics in Athens, and the 2004 UEFA European Under-21 Championship. Although he played for the country at under-21 level, he was also eligible to represent the Democratic Republic of Congo if he made an application to apply in 2004; subsequently, he was invited by the African nation to appear for them in the 2006 World Cup qualifying campaign.

On 8 November 2011, Bosingwa withdrew himself from international football until the removal of manager Paulo Bento. The latter claimed that the player was left out of the Euro 2012 qualifying matches against Bosnia and Herzegovina due to questions about his attitude and mentality; the Portuguese Football Federation criticized the player for his decision and the timing of his statement.

After more than three years of absence, on 7 November 2014, Bosingwa was called up by new manager Fernando Santos for a Euro 2016 qualifier against Armenia and a friendly with Argentina.

== Style of play ==
An attacking full-back, Bosingwa's pace and ability to get up and down the flanks created problems for the opposition.

== Career statistics ==
=== Club ===
Appearances and goals by club, season and competition
| Club | Season | League | | | National cup (Note: Includes Taça de Portugal, FA Cup, Turkish Cup) | | League cup (Note: Includes League Cup) | | Europe | | Other | | Total | |
| Club | Season | Division | Apps | Goals | Apps | Goals | Apps | Goals | Apps | Goals | Apps | Goals | Apps | Goals |
|---|---|---|---|---|---|---|---|---|---|---|---|---|---|---|
| Freamunde (loan) | 2000–01 | Segunda Liga | 11 | 0 | 0 | 0 | — | | — | | — | | 11 | 0 |
| Boavista | 2001–02 | Primeira Liga | 15 | 0 | 0 | 0 | — | | 7 (Note: Appearances in UEFA Champions League) | 0 | — | | 22 | 0 |
| Boavista | 2002–03 | Primeira Liga | 26 | 0 | 0 | 0 | — | | 12 (Note: Four appearances in UEFA Champions League, eight in UEFA Cup) | 0 | — | | 38 | 0 |
| Boavista | Total | | 41 | 0 | 0 | 0 | — | | 19 | 0 | — | | 60 | 0 |
| Porto | 2003–04 | Primeira Liga | 13 | 1 | 2 | 0 | — | | 8 | 0 | 1 (Note: Appearance in UEFA Super Cup) | 0 | 24 | 1 |
| Porto | 2004–05 | Primeira Liga | 25 | 1 | 1 | 0 | — | | 5 | 0 | 1 (Note: Appearances in Supertaça Cândido de Oliveira) | 0 | 32 | 1 |
| Porto | 2005–06 | Primeira Liga | 21 | 0 | 5 | 0 | — | | 5 | 0 | — | | 31 | 0 |
| Porto | 2006–07 | Primeira Liga | 25 | 0 | 0 | 0 | — | | 6 | 0 | 1 | 0 | 32 | 0 |
| Porto | 2007–08 | Primeira Liga | 23 | 1 | 2 | 0 | 0 | 0 | 7 | 0 | 1 | 0 | 33 | 1 |
| Porto | Total | | 107 | 3 | 10 | 0 | 0 | 0 | 31 | 0 | 4 | 0 | 152 | 3 |
| Chelsea | 2008–09 | Premier League | 34 | 2 | 4 | 0 | 0 | 0 | 10 | 0 | — | | 48 | 2 |
| Chelsea | 2009–10 | Premier League | 8 | 0 | 0 | 0 | 0 | 0 | 0 | 0 | 1 (Note: Appearance in FA Community Shield) | 0 | 9 | 0 |
| Chelsea | 2010–11 | Premier League | 20 | 0 | 2 | 0 | 0 | 0 | 4 | 0 | 0 | 0 | 26 | 0 |
| Chelsea | 2011–12 | Premier League | 27 | 1 | 4 | 0 | 1 | 0 | 11 | 0 | — | | 43 | 1 |
| Chelsea | Total | | 89 | 3 | 10 | 0 | 1 | 0 | 25 | 0 | 1 | 0 | 126 | 3 |
| Queens Park Rangers | 2012–13 | Premier League | 23 | 0 | 0 | 0 | 1 | 1 | — | | — | | 24 | 1 |
| Trabzonspor | 2013–14 | Süper Lig | 27 | 0 | 1 | 0 | — | | 8 (Note: Appearances in UEFA Europa League) | 0 | — | | 36 | 0 |
| Trabzonspor | 2014–15 | Süper Lig | 24 | 0 | 2 | 0 | — | | 8 | 0 | — | | 34 | 0 |
| Trabzonspor | 2015–16 | Süper Lig | 12 | 0 | 0 | 0 | — | | 0 | 0 | — | | 12 | 0 |
| Trabzonspor | Total | | 63 | 0 | 3 | 0 | — | | 16 | 0 | — | | 82 | 0 |
| Career total | | | 334 | 6 | 23 | 0 | 2 | 1 | 91 | 0 | 5 | 0 | 455 | 7 |

=== International ===
Appearances and goals by national team and year
| National team | Year | Apps | Goals |
|---|---|---|---|
| Portugal | 2007 | 6 | 0 |
| Portugal | 2008 | 10 | 0 |
| Portugal | 2009 | 7 | 0 |
| Portugal | 2010 | 1 | 0 |
| Portugal | 2014 | 2 | 0 |
| Portugal | 2015 | 1 | 0 |
| Total | | 27 | 0 |

== Honours ==
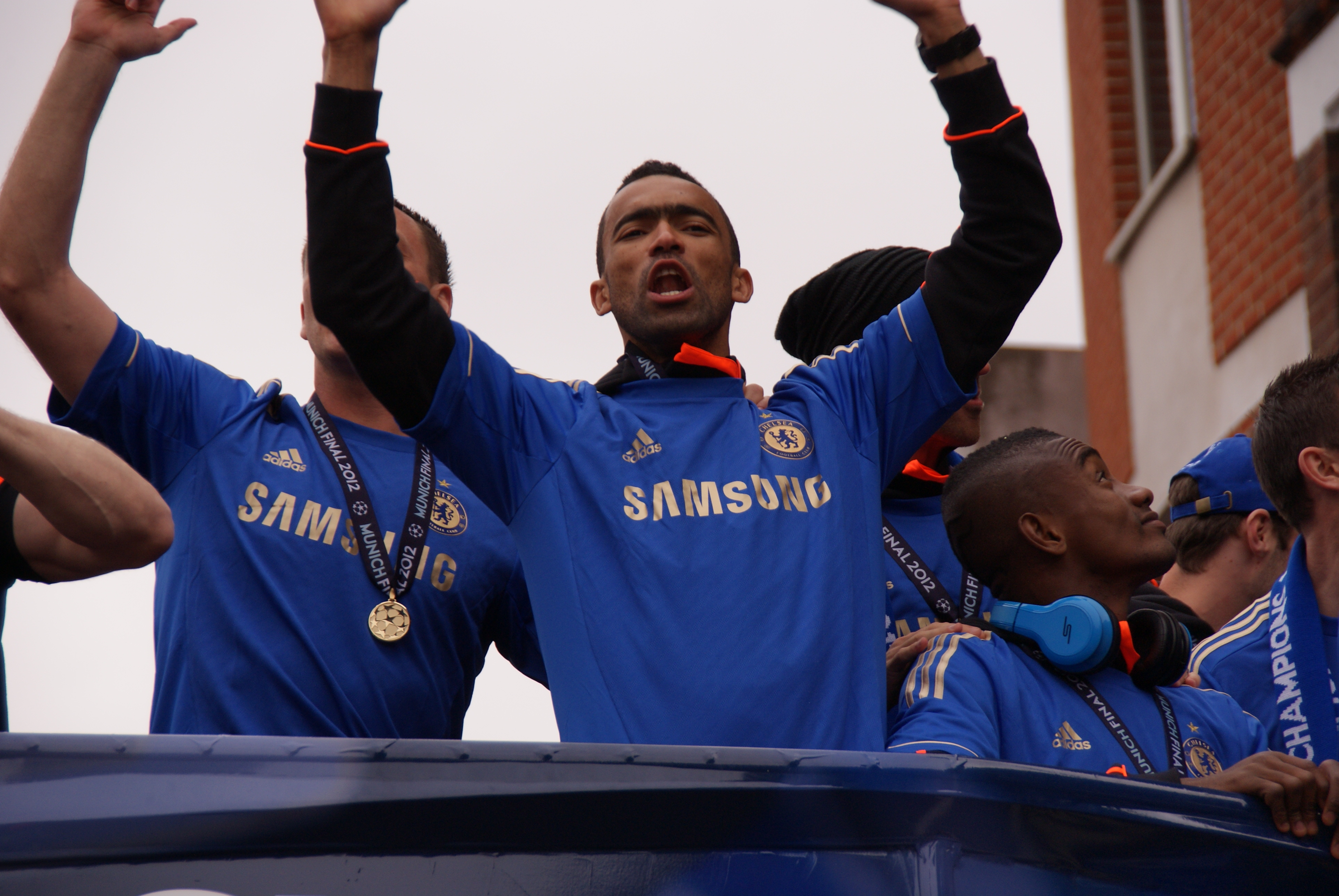
Bosingwa on Chelsea's victory parade following their UEFA Champions League victory in 2012

Porto

- Primeira Liga: 2003–04, 2005–06, 2006–07, 2007–08
- Taça de Portugal: 2005–06
- Supertaça Cândido de Oliveira: 2004, 2006
- UEFA Champions League: 2003–04
- Intercontinental Cup: 2004

Chelsea

- FA Cup: 2008–09, 2011–12
- FA Community Shield: 2009
- UEFA Champions League: 2011–12

Individual

- FC Porto Player of the Year: 2007
- UEFA European Championship Team of the Tournament: 2008
