= Damien Tixier =

French footballer (born 1980)

Personal information
- Full name: Damien Florian Gérald Tixier
- Date of birth: 23 June 1980 (age 46)
- Place of birth: Nîmes, France
- Height: 1.80 m (5 ft 11 in)
- Position: Left back

Youth career
- 1998–1999: Beaucaire

Senior career*
Years	Team	Apps	(Gls)
1999–2000	Beaucaire	13	(0)
2000–2002	Naval	52	(0)
2002–2005	Académica	68	(1)
2005–2007	Leiria	37	(1)
2007	→ Lens (loan)	6	(0)
2007–2009	Le Havre	36	(0)
2009–2010	Neuchâtel Xamax	19	(0)
2010–2012	Nantes	17	(0)
- * Club domestic league appearances and goals

Damien Florian Gérald Tixier (French pronunciation: [damjɛ̃ flɔʁjɑ̃ ʒeʁald tiksje]; born 23 June 1980) is a French football defender who last played for FC Nantes in Ligue 2. He formerly played for Swiss Super League club Neuchâtel Xamax until his contract was terminated on 28 March 2010 due to an excessive number of red cards. He joined FC Nantes in Ligue 2 on 10 July 2010.
