= Diogo Fonseca (footballer, born 1984) =

Portuguese footballer

Personal information
- Full name: Diogo Augusto Tavares Fonseca da Costa
- Date of birth: 11 December 1984 (age 41)
- Place of birth: Ponta Delgada, Portugal
- Height: 1.87 m (6 ft 2 in)
- Position: Centre forward

Youth career
- 1995–1999: União Micaelense
- 1999–2002: Santa Clara

Senior career*
Years	Team	Apps	(Gls)
2002–2005	Santa Clara	33	(3)
2005–2007	Vitória Setúbal	16	(0)
2007	→ Operário (loan)	12	(4)
2007–2009	Mallorca B	28	(18)
2008–2009	→ Granada (loan)	29	(3)
2009–2010	Boavista	26	(11)
2010–2011	Feirense	11	(1)
2011–2012	Aves	13	(0)
2012–2013	Tondela	33	(5)
2013–2014	Brașov	20	(1)
2014–2015	Feirense	36	(5)
2015–2016	Académico Viseu	14	(2)
2016	Oliveirense	10	(4)
2017–2019	Praiense	76	(13)
Total		357	(70)

International career
2003	Portugal U19	4	(1)
2003	Portugal U20	1	(0)
2004	Portugal U21	1	(0)
- * Club domestic league appearances and goals

Diogo Augusto Tavares Fonseca da Costa (born 11 December 1984 in Ponta Delgada, Azores) is a Portuguese former professional footballer who played as a centre forward.
