= Helton (footballer) =

Brazilian footballer and manager (born 1978)

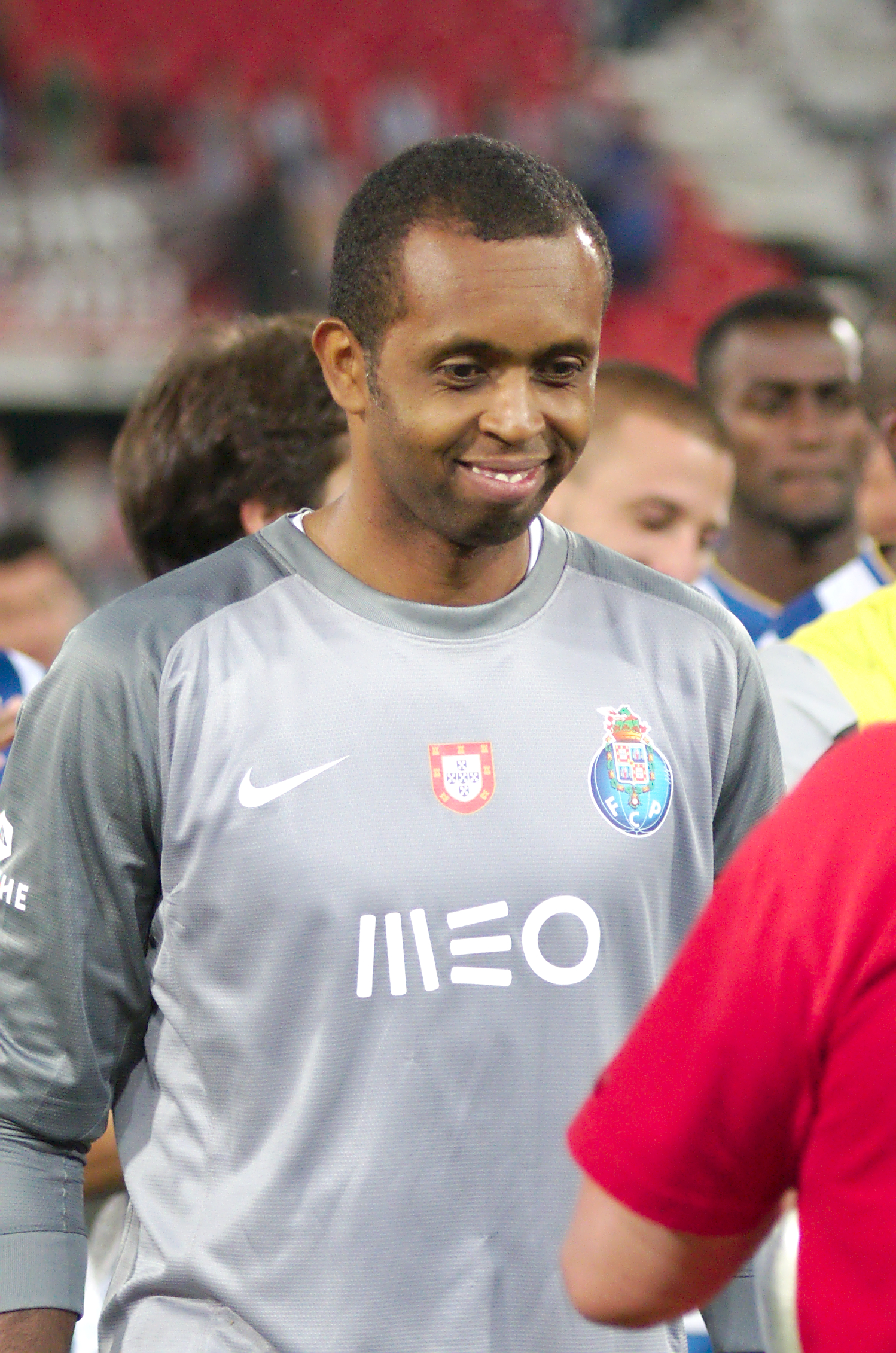
- Helton with Porto in 2013

Personal information
- Full name: Helton da Silva Arruda
- Date of birth: 18 May 1978 (age 48)
- Place of birth: São Gonçalo, Brazil
- Height: 1.89 m (6 ft 2 in)
- Position: Goalkeeper

Youth career
- 1993–1994: São Cristóvão
- 1995–1998: Vasco da Gama

Senior career*
Years	Team	Apps	(Gls)
1999–2002	Vasco da Gama	52	(0)
2003–2005	União Leiria	67	(0)
2005–2016	Porto	232	(0)
2020–2021	União Leiria	5	(0)
Total		356	(0)

International career
2000	Brazil U23	6	(0)
2006–2007	Brazil	3	(0)

Managerial career
- 2018: Freamunde
Medal record
Men's football
Representing Brazil
Copa América
Winner	2007 Venezuela
- * Club domestic league appearances and goals

Helton da Silva Arruda (born 18 May 1978), known simply as Helton, is a Brazilian former professional footballer who played as a goalkeeper.

After starting out at Vasco da Gama, he went on to spend his career in Portugal, representing União de Leiria and Porto and winning 18 major titles with the latter club. Over 14 seasons, he appeared in 299 Primeira Liga games.

Helton appeared for Brazil at the 2007 Copa América.

== Club career ==
=== Vasco ===
Born in São Gonçalo, Rio de Janeiro, Helton emerged through Vasco da Gama's youth system. He first attracted attention after winning the Série A and the Copa Mercosur with the club in 2000.

=== União de Leiria ===
In 2002, Helton's contract with Vasco expired and he signed with Portuguese club União de Leiria in January of the following year. He made his official debut on 9 March 2003 in a 3–1 home win against Académica de Coimbra in the Taça de Portugal, and backed up Paulo Costinha in his first season.

At the end of the 2004–05 campaign, having been first-choice in his last two years, Helton joined Porto.

=== Porto ===
It seemed that Helton was destined to spend a long time bench-warming, as Porto legend Vítor Baía barred his way into the first team. However, he got his chance sooner than expected when Dutch coach Co Adriaanse summarily dropped Baía after a mistake against Estrela da Amadora cost the team a goal and a 2–1 away loss on 15 January 2006.

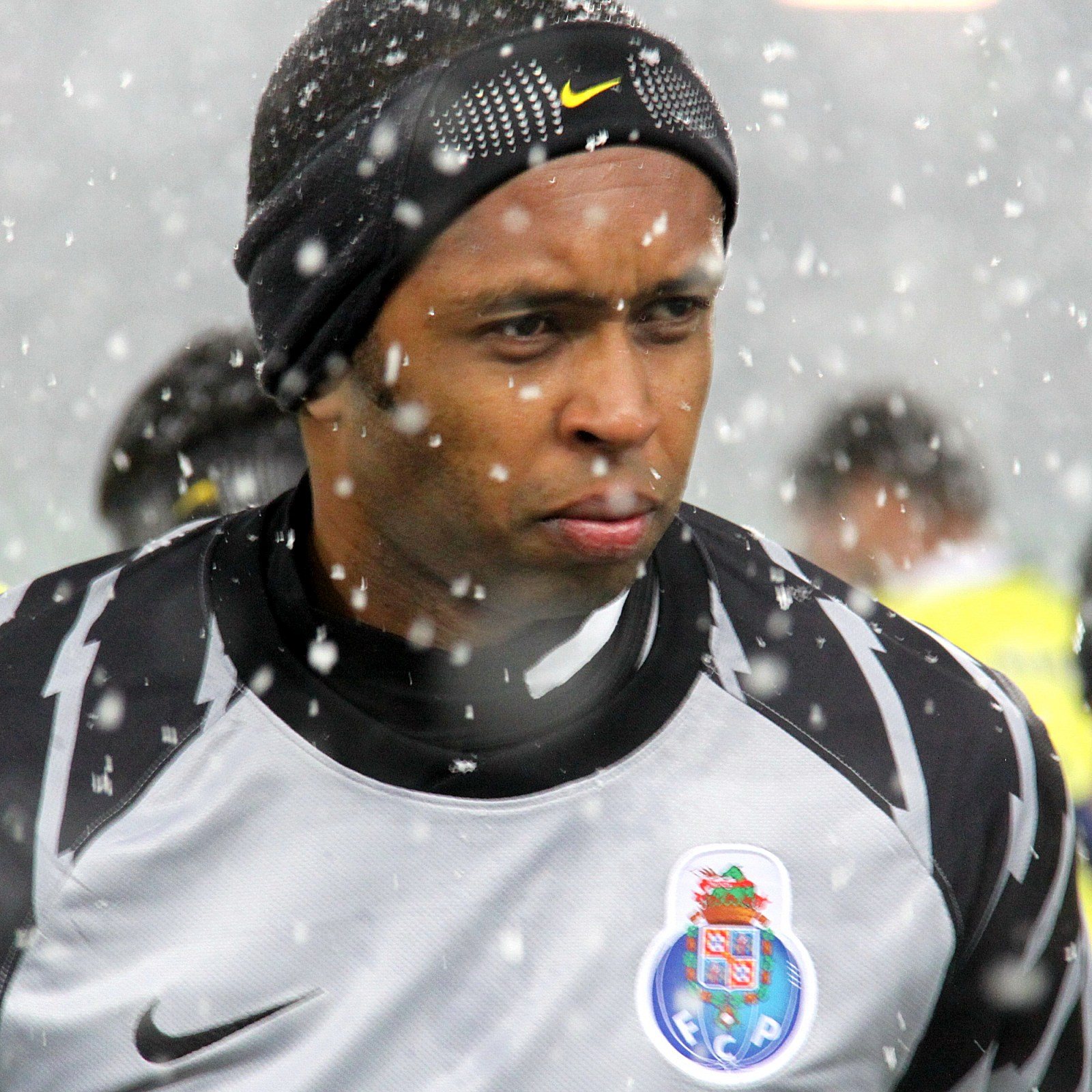
Helton with Porto against Rapid Wien in the 2010–11 Europa League

After initial criticism, Helton became first-choice courtesy of several solid performances. He won a domestic double (Primeira Liga and cup) in his first season at the club.

Helton continued to be an undisputed starter for Porto in the following years, as they won four consecutive domestic championships. In 2008–09's Portuguese Cup, however, he stayed on the bench as Nuno Espírito Santo was the starter for the eventual winners.

From 2009 to 2011, Helton totalled 77 games and his team claimed six titles. In October 2010, he was awarded Portuguese citizenship.

On 18 May 2011, Helton celebrated his 33rd birthday by keeping a clean sheet in the final of the UEFA Europa League, a 1–0 victory over fellow Portuguese Braga. Following the departure of Lucho González to Marseille in summer 2009, he was also appointed captain.

Helton played 30 matches in the 2012–13 campaign, winning his seventh league. On 16 March 2014, however, the 35-year-old suffered an achilles tendon injury to his right leg during a 1–0 defeat at Sporting CP, being sidelined for several months.

On 17 February 2014, Helton was condemned to pay a €60,000 fine for assaulting two stewards at the Estádio da Luz, following a tunnel brawl during the 1–0 loss against Benfica on 20 December 2009. After returning to action, he played second-fiddle to both Fabiano and Iker Casillas.

Helton terminated his contract on 12 October 2016 at the age of 38. He announced his retirement the following year, but returned shortly after to play as a forward for the veteran side of amateurs Canidelo.

Helton started his coaching career in January 2018, being appointed at Portuguese third division club Freamunde. He briefly returned as a player in October 2020, rejoining União Leiria who now competed in the third tier.

== International career ==
After competing in the 1997 FIFA World Youth Championship, Helton was a member of the Brazilian team at the 2000 Summer Olympics. He appeared in all four matches as the nation was eliminated in the quarter-finals by Cameroon.

Helton received his first call-up to the full side in 2006, taking part in an unofficial exhibition game against Kuwait on 7 October. His competitive debut came on 15 November that year when he started a friendly with Switzerland, and he was also featured against England in June 2007, in what was the first international to be played at the new Wembley Stadium.

Helton was a member of the squad who won the 2007 Copa América, but did not feature once in the tournament as he was second choice to Roma's Doni.

== Career statistics ==
=== Club ===
Appearances and goals by club, season and competition
Club	Season	League			National cup		League cup		Continental		Other		Total	
Club	Season	Division	Apps	Goals	Apps	Goals	Apps	Goals	Apps	Goals	Apps	Goals	Apps	Goals
Vasco da Gama	1999	Série A	0	0	0	0	—		—		8	0	8	0
Vasco da Gama	2000	Série A	23	0	0	0	—		5	0	1	0	29	0
Vasco da Gama	2001	Série A	25	0	0	0	—		8	0	4	0	37	0
Vasco da Gama	2002	Série A	4	0	1	0	—		—		3	0	8	0
Vasco da Gama	Total		52	0	1	0	—		13	0	16	0	82	0
União Leiria	2002–03	Primeira Liga	9	0	3	0	—		—		—		12	0
União Leiria	2003–04	Primeira Liga	28	0	1	0	—		4	0	1	0	34	0
União Leiria	2004–05	Primeira Liga	30	0	0	0	—		—		6	0	36	0
União Leiria	Total		67	0	4	0	—		4	0	7	0	82	0
Porto	2005–06	Primeira Liga	11	0	2	0	—		0	0	—		13	0
Porto	2006–07	Primeira Liga	30	0	0	0	—		8	0	1	0	39	0
Porto	2007–08	Primeira Liga	25	0	0	0	0	0	7	0	1	0	33	0
Porto	2008–09	Primeira Liga	26	0	1	0	0	0	9	0	1	0	37	0
Porto	2009–10	Primeira Liga	24	0	1	0	0	0	7	0	1	0	33	0
Porto	2010–11	Primeira Liga	25	0	1	0	1	0	16	0	1	0	44	0
Porto	2011–12	Primeira Liga	29	0	0	0	0	0	8	0	2	0	39	0
Porto	2012–13	Primeira Liga	30	0	0	0	1	0	8	0	1	0	40	0
Porto	2013–14	Primeira Liga	23	0	0	0	1	0	9	0	1	0	33	0
Porto	2014–15	Primeira Liga	7	0	0	0	4	0	0	0	—		11	0
Porto	2015–16	Primeira Liga	2	0	7	0	3	0	0	0	—		12	0
Porto	Total		232	0	12	0	9	0	72	0	9	0	334	0
União Leiria	2020–21	Campeonato de Portugal	5	0	2	0	—		—		—		7	0
Career total			356	0	19	0	9	0	89	0	32	0	505	0

=== International ===
Appearances and goals by national team and year
National team	Year	Apps	Goals
Brazil	2006	1	0
Brazil	2007	2	0
Total		3	0

== Honours ==
Vasco da Gama

- Campeonato Brasileiro Série A: 2000
- Campeonato Carioca: 1998
- Copa Mercosur: 2000
- Taça Guanabara: 2000
- Taça Rio: 2001

Porto

- Primeira Liga: 2005–06, 2006–07, 2007–08, 2008–09, 2010–11, 2011–12, 2012–13
- Taça de Portugal: 2005–06, 2008–09, 2009–10, 2010–11
- Supertaça Cândido de Oliveira: 2006, 2009, 2010, 2011, 2012, 2013
- UEFA Europa League: 2010–11

Brazil

- Copa América: 2007

Individual

- Primeira Liga Goalkeeper of the Year: 2010–11, 2012–13
