= Marek Čech (Slovak footballer) =

Slovak footballer (born 1983)

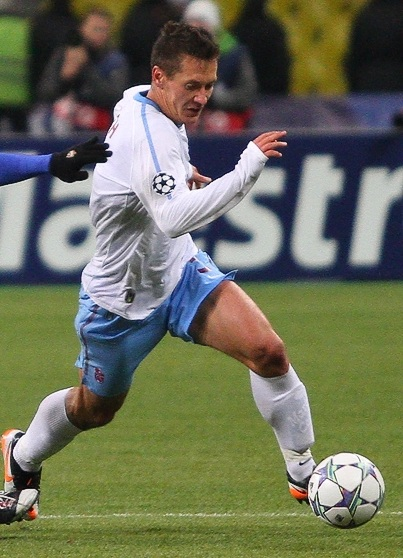
- Čech playing in the Champions League with Trabzonspor in 2011

Personal information
- Full name: Marek Čech
- Date of birth: 26 January 1983 (age 43)
- Place of birth: Trebišov, Czechoslovakia
- Height: 1.83 m (6 ft 0 in)
- Position: Left back

Youth career
- Trebišov
- Inter Bratislava

Senior career*
Years	Team	Apps	(Gls)
2000–2004	Inter Bratislava	71	(1)
2004–2005	Sparta Prague	17	(0)
2005–2008	Porto	78	(2)
2008–2011	West Bromwich Albion	54	(2)
2011–2013	Trabzonspor	44	(1)
2013–2014	Bologna	11	(0)
2015	Boavista	15	(1)
2016	Como	4	(0)
Total		294	(7)

International career
2004–2013	Slovakia	52	(5)
- * Club domestic league appearances and goals

Marek Čech (born 26 January 1983) is a retired Slovak professional footballer. He primarily played as an attacking left-sided full-back or wing-back.

He won the Primeira Liga in each of his three seasons at Porto, in addition to titles at Slovan Bratislava and Sparta Prague earlier in his career. He also spent time at West Bromwich Albion in England and Trabzonspor in Turkey, in addition to two brief spells in Italy at the end of his career.

Čech earned 52 caps for Slovakia, having made his debut in 2004. He represented the nation at the 2010 FIFA World Cup.

== Club career ==
=== Early career ===
Born in Trebišov, Čech began his career with Inter Bratislava, where he won a league and cup double in 2000–01. After helping Sparta Prague to the 2004–05 Czech First League, he transferred to Porto on 31 August 2005 in an undisclosed deal. In the 2005–06 season, he was part of Co Adriaanse's triumphant Primeira Liga- and Taça de Portugal-winning Porto team, and also won the league in his two subsequent seasons.

=== West Bromwich Albion ===
On 15 July 2008, Čech signed for Premier League club West Bromwich Albion for £1.4 million, on a three-year contract with the option of a fourth. He made his debut the following month, playing in midfield in a 1–0 defeat to Arsenal in the opening match of the 2008–09 Premier League season. Manager Tony Mowbray referred to him as a "model professional" and said that he had brought the player in to create competition for left-back Paul Robinson. However, he was unable to command a regular place in the side, making just 11 appearances all season.

Following the departure of Mowbray and the sale of Robinson, Čech established himself as an important member of Roberto Di Matteo's squad. He scored his first two goals for West Brom in a 3–1 win over Plymouth Argyle on 12 September 2009. In May 2011, Čech signed a one-year contract extension with West Brom, along with teammate Roman Bednář.

=== Later career ===
On 31 August 2011, Čech signed for Turkish Süper Lig club Trabzonspor, on a three-year deal worth €1 million per year.

Čech signed for Serie A club Bologna for a €500,000 fee on 19 August 2013, on a contract of one season with the option of a second. On 5 January 2015 he returned to the city of Porto, signing for Boavista for the remainder of the season as injury cover for their defence. He played 16 games for the Panteras Negras and scored once, equalising in a 3–1 comeback win at home to Vitória S.C. on 15 March. He went back to Italy in March 2016, signing for Como of Serie B.

== International career ==
Čech made his senior international debut for Slovakia on 9 July 2004 at the Kirin Cup in Japan, playing the full 90 minutes of a 3–1 loss to the hosts. He scored his first goal on 8 September 2007 in a 2–2 home draw with the Republic of Ireland in UEFA Euro 2008 qualifying, and added two more on 21 November in a 5–0 win away to San Marino.

On 6 June 2009, Čech scored another two goals as the Slovaks won 7–0 at home to the same opponents in 2010 FIFA World Cup qualification. Manager Vladimír Weiss named him in the 23-man squad for the final tournament in South Africa, their first tournament as an independent nation. The team reached the last 16, but he played only once, the opening 1–1 draw with New Zealand in Rustenburg, where he lined up against his West Bromwich teammate Chris Wood. He criticised the vuvuzelas in the crowd for making communication difficult.

== Career statistics ==
=== International ===
Appearances and goals by national team and year
National team	Year	Apps	Goals
Slovakia	2004	7	0
Slovakia	2005	3	0
Slovakia	2006	6	0
Slovakia	2007	7	3
Slovakia	2008	8	0
Slovakia	2009	7	2
Slovakia	2010	4	0
Slovakia	2011	6	0
Slovakia	2012	3	0
Slovakia	2013	1	0
Total		52	5

Scores and results list Slovakia's goal tally first, score column indicates score after each Čech goal.

List of international goals scored by Marek Čech
No.	Date	Venue	Opponent	Score	Result	Competition	Ref.
1	8 September 2007	Tehelné pole, Bratislava, Slovakia	Republic of Ireland	2–2	2–2	UEFA Euro 2008 qualifying	
2	21 November 2007	San Marino Stadium, Serravalle, San Marino	San Marino	4–0	5–0	UEFA Euro 2008 qualifying	
3	21 November 2007	San Marino Stadium, Serravalle, San Marino	San Marino	5–0	5–0	UEFA Euro 2008 qualifying	
4	6 June 2009	Tehelné pole, Bratislava, Slovakia	San Marino	1–0	7–0	2010 FIFA World Cup qualification	
5	6 June 2009	Tehelné pole, Bratislava, Slovakia	San Marino	3–0	7–0	2010 FIFA World Cup qualification	

== Honours ==
=== Club ===
Inter Bratislava

- Slovak Superliga: 2000–01
- Slovak Cup: 2000–01

Sparta Prague

- Czech First League: 2004–05

Porto

- Primeira Liga: 2005–06, 2006–07, 2007–08
- Taça de Portugal: 2005–06
- Supertaça Cândido de Oliveira: 2006

=== International ===
Slovakia U19

- 2002 UEFA European Under-19 Football Championship – Third place
