= Adalto =

Brazilian footballer (born 1978)

Personal information
- Full name: Adalto Batista da Silva
- Date of birth: 30 August 1978 (age 48)
- Place of birth: Votuporanga, Brazil
- Height: 1.70 m (5 ft 7 in)
- Position: Left-back

Senior career*
Years	Team	Apps	(Gls)
1999	América de Natal		
1999–2001	Nacional	17	(0)
2001	Consadole Sapporo	7	(0)
2002–2004	Palmeiras	3	(0)
2003–2004	→ Samsunspor (loan)	23	(1)
2005	Guarani		
2005–2008	Vitória Setúbal	46	(0)
2006	Vitória Setúbal B	1	(1)
2010	América	2	(0)
2010	Marília	6	(1)
- * Club domestic league appearances and goals

Adalto Batista da Silva (born 30 August 1978) is a Brazilian former professional footballer who played as a left-back.

== Honours ==
- Taça da Liga: 2007–08
- Uruguayan Primera División: 2000, 2001
