= Nandinho (footballer, born 1975) =

Portuguese footballer

Personal information
- Full name: Fernando Manuel Pinto Rodrigues
- Date of birth: 13 October 1975 (age 51)
- Place of birth: Setúbal, Portugal
- Height: 1.75 m (5 ft 9 in)
- Position: Left-back

Youth career
- 1985–1986: Vitória Setúbal
- 1986–1989: Pelezinhos
- 1989–1994: Vitória Setúbal

Senior career*
Years	Team	Apps	(Gls)
1994–1995	Comércio Indústria		
1995–1998	Estrela Vendas Novas	30	(6)
1998–2000	Maia	61	(9)
2000–2003	Salgueiros	77	(4)
2003–2004	Alverca	14	(0)
2004–2007	Vitória Setúbal	66	(1)
2007–2009	Alki Larnaca	53	(0)
Total		301	(20)
- * Club domestic league appearances and goals

Fernando Manuel Pinto Rodrigues (born 13 October 1975 in Setúbal), known as Nandinho, is a Portuguese retired footballer who played as a left-back.

== Honours ==
Vitória Setúbal

- Taça de Portugal: 2004–05
