= Paulo Assunção =

Brazilian footballer (born 1980)

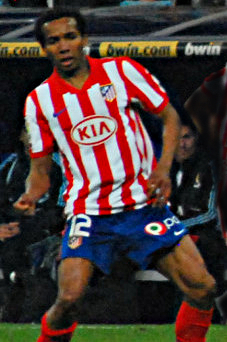
- Assunção in action for Atlético Madrid in 2010

Personal information
- Full name: Paulo Assunção da Silva
- Date of birth: 25 January 1980 (age 46)
- Place of birth: Várzea Grande, Brazil
- Height: 1.75 m (5 ft 9 in)
- Position: Defensive midfielder

Senior career*
| Years | Team | Apps | (Gls) |
| 2000 | Palmeiras | 0 | (0) |
| 2000–2001 | Porto B | 36 | (4) |
| 2001–2002 | Palmeiras | 24 | (0) |
| 2002–2004 | Nacional | 50 | (2) |
| 2004–2008 | Porto | 73 | (0) |
| 2004–2005 | → AEK Athens (loan) | 24 | (0) |
| 2008–2012 | Atlético Madrid | 97 | (1) |
| 2012 | São Paulo | 11 | (0) |
| 2013 | Deportivo La Coruña | 9 | (0) |
| 2014 | Levadiakos | 0 | (0) |
| Total | | 324 | (7) |
- * Club domestic league appearances and goals

Paulo Assunção da Silva (born 25 January 1980), known as Assunção, is a Brazilian former professional footballer who played as a defensive midfielder.

He also held a Portuguese passport due to the many years in spent in the country, mainly at the service of Porto. He also played four years in La Liga with Atlético Madrid, winning two Europa League trophies.

== Club career ==
=== Early years and Porto ===
Assunção was born in Várzea Grande, Mato Grosso. He first appeared professionally for Palmeiras then emigrated to Portugal, having a short stint with Porto's reserves only to return to Palmeiras. For the 2002–03 season he joined Madeira's Nacional, making his Primeira Liga debut on 26 January 2003 in a 0–0 home draw against Vitória de Guimarães.

Following two highly successful individual campaigns, Assunção was purchased again by Porto, but would be loaned for 2004–05 to AEK Athens, moving alongside his teammate Bruno Alves on the indication of their former coach Fernando Santos. In July 2005 he returned, going on to be an instrumental element in the team's midfield (alongside Raul Meireles and Lucho González) as they eventually won three consecutive league championships.

Assunção left the Estádio do Dragão after being threatened with a shot to the knee by Porto supporters who wanted him to renew his contract.

=== Atlético Madrid ===
In early July 2008, having bought out the remainder of his contract, Assunção joined Atlético Madrid. He adjusted quickly at the capital side, playing all La Liga matches safe four and helping them to repeat the fourth-place finish, with a subsequent qualification for the UEFA Champions League.

Defensive-minded Assunção scored his first goal for the Colchoneros on 17 January 2010, during the team's 3–2 home win against Sporting de Gijón. whilst continuing as the undisputed starter at holding midfielder. He lost that position midway through the 2010–11 season to newly signed Mario Suárez.

In the 2011–12 campaign, Assunção was only fourth choice in his position after Suárez, Gabi and Tiago. He did contribute six appearances – four starts – as Atlético reached and won the final of the UEFA Europa League.

=== São Paulo and Deportivo ===
After more than one decade in European football, Assunção returned to his country with São Paulo. The deal was confirmed on 21 July 2012 but, on 28 December, it was terminated by mutual consent, with the player moving back to Spain and joining Deportivo de La Coruña.

In January 2014, the 34-year-old Assunção signed for Levadiakos in the Super League Greece,

== Personal life ==
Assunção's son, Gustavo, is also a footballer and a midfielder.

== Career statistics ==
Appearances and goals by club, season and competition
| Club | Season | League | | Cup | | League Cup | | Continental | | Other (Note: Includes Copa dos Campeões, Campeonato Paulista, Supertaça Cândido de Oliveira, Torneio Rio – São Paulo and UEFA Super Cup) | | Total | |
| Club | Season | Apps | Goals | Apps | Goals | Apps | Goals | Apps | Goals | Apps | Goals | Apps | Goals |
|---|---|---|---|---|---|---|---|---|---|---|---|---|---|
| Palmeiras | 1999 | 0 | 0 | 0 | 0 | — | | 0 | 0 | 2 | 0 | 2 | 0 |
| Palmeiras | 2000 | 0 | 0 | 1 | 0 | — | | 0 | 0 | 5 | 0 | 6 | 0 |
| Palmeiras | Total | 0 | 0 | 1 | 0 | — | | 0 | 0 | 7 | 0 | 8 | 0 |
| Porto B | 2000–01 | 36 | 4 | — | | — | | — | | — | | 36 | 4 |
| Porto | 2000–01 | 0 | 0 | 0 | 0 | — | | 0 | 0 | — | | 0 | 0 |
| Palmeiras | 2001 | 2 | 0 | — | | — | | — | | — | | 2 | 0 |
| Palmeiras | 2002 | 22 | 0 | 0 | 0 | — | | — | | 2 | 0 | 24 | 0 |
| Palmeiras | Total | 24 | 0 | 0 | 0 | — | | — | | 2 | 0 | 26 | 0 |
| Nacional | 2002–03 | 16 | 1 | 0 | 0 | — | | — | | — | | 16 | 1 |
| Nacional | 2003–04 | 34 | 1 | 3 | 0 | — | | — | | — | | 37 | 1 |
| Nacional | Total | 50 | 2 | 3 | 0 | — | | — | | — | | 53 | 2 |
| Porto | 2004–05 | 0 | 0 | — | | — | | — | | — | | 0 | 0 |
| Porto | 2005–06 | 25 | 0 | 4 | 0 | — | | 4 | 0 | — | | 33 | 0 |
| Porto | 2006–07 | 22 | 0 | 1 | 0 | — | | 7 | 0 | 1 | 0 | 31 | 0 |
| Porto | 2007–08 | 26 | 0 | 4 | 0 | 0 | 0 | 8 | 0 | 1 | 0 | 39 | 0 |
| Porto | Total | 73 | 0 | 9 | 0 | 0 | 0 | 19 | 0 | 2 | 0 | 103 | 0 |
| AEK Athens (loan) | 2004–05 | 24 | 0 | 8 | 0 | — | | 5 | 0 | — | | 37 | 0 |
| Atlético Madrid | 2008–09 | 34 | 0 | 1 | 0 | — | | 8 | 0 | — | | 43 | 0 |
| Atlético Madrid | 2009–10 | 30 | 1 | 7 | 0 | — | | 16 | 0 | — | | 53 | 1 |
| Atlético Madrid | 2010–11 | 24 | 0 | 5 | 0 | — | | 4 | 0 | 1 | 0 | 34 | 0 |
| Atlético Madrid | 2011–12 | 9 | 0 | 2 | 0 | — | | 6 | 0 | — | | 17 | 0 |
| Atlético Madrid | Total | 97 | 1 | 15 | 0 | — | | 34 | 0 | 1 | 0 | 147 | 1 |
| São Paulo | 2012 | 11 | 0 | — | | — | | 0 | 0 | — | | 11 | 0 |
| Deportivo | 2012–13 | 9 | 0 | — | | — | | — | | — | | 9 | 0 |
| Levadiakos | 2013–14 | 0 | 0 | — | | — | | — | | — | | 0 | 0 |
| Career total | | 324 | 7 | 36 | 0 | 0 | 0 | 58 | 0 | 12 | 0 | 430 | 7 |

== Honours ==
Porto

- Primeira Liga: 2005–06, 2006–07, 2007–08
- Taça de Portugal: 2005–06
- Supertaça Cândido de Oliveira: 2006

Atlético Madrid

- UEFA Europa League: 2009–10, 2011–12
- UEFA Super Cup: 2010
- Copa del Rey runner-up: 2009–10
