= Binho (footballer, born 1977) =

Brazilian footballer

Personal information
- Full name: George Miranda dos Santos
- Date of birth: June 24, 1977 (age 49)
- Place of birth: Tucano, Brazil
- Height: 1.83 m (6 ft 0 in)
- Position: Midfielder

Senior career*
Years	Team	Apps	(Gls)
1998–2000	Corinthians Alagoano		
2000–2002	Naval 1º de Maio	51	(6)
2002–2003	Académica	14	(2)
2003–2004	Naval 1º de Maio	30	(1)
2004–2007	Vitória Setúbal	65	(1)
2007–2008	Iraklis	7	(0)
2009	Ferroviária		
2009	São Bento		
2010	Petrochimi Tabriz F.C.		
2011	Funorte		
- * Club domestic league appearances and goals

George Miranda dos Santos (born 24 June 1977), known as Binho, is a Brazilian former footballer who last played as a midfielder.

In June 2007 he was signed by Iraklis but he was released on free in January's transfer window.

== Honours ==
Vitória Setúbal

- Taça de Portugal: 2004–05
