= Adriano (footballer, born January 1979) =

Brazilian footballer

Personal information
- Full name: Adriano Vieira Louzada
- Date of birth: 3 January 1979 (age 47)
- Place of birth: Rio Branco, Brazil
- Height: 1.81 m (5 ft 11 1/2 in)
- Position: Striker

Senior career*
Years	Team	Apps	(Gls)
1996–1997	Juventus-AC		
1998–1999	Portuguesa	5	(0)
2000	Palmeiras	12	(2)
2001	Vitória	17	(3)
2002	Palmeiras	0	(0)
2002–2005	Nacional	89	(43)
2005	Cruzeiro	11	(2)
2006–2009	Porto	49	(19)
2009–2010	Braga	7	(0)
2010	Sport	4	(0)
2011	Santo André	4	(0)
2011–2012	Oliveirense	26	(10)
2013	Grêmio Barueri	7	(2)
2014–2015	Rio Branco-AC	13	(7)
2015	Galvez	5	(0)
2016	Atlético Acreano	1	(1)
2016	Rio Branco-AC	6	(1)
2019	Rio Branco-AC	4	(1)
Total		260	(91)
- * Club domestic league appearances and goals as of 9 June 2019

Adriano Vieira Louzada (born 3 January 1979), known simply as Adriano, is a Brazilian former professional footballer who played as a striker.

He spent most of his career in Portugal, amassing Primeira Liga totals of 145 matches and 62 goals over seven seasons in representation of Nacional, Porto and Braga and winning five major titles with the second club.

== Club career ==
Adriano was born in Rio Branco, Acre. He started out in 1998 with Associação Portuguesa de Desportos, then went on to represent in his country Sociedade Esportiva Palmeiras.

Switching to Portugal in 2002, Adriano began playing with Madeira's C.D. Nacional. After a quick return stint in Brazil with Cruzeiro Esporte Clube he joined FC Porto in January 2006, and gradually made his way into the starting eleven, helping the northern club to conquer the Primeira Liga championship and also scoring the winning goal in that year's Taça de Portugal final.

After Lisandro López was reconverted as a striker, Adriano lost his starter status, but was often brought in from the bench. In August 2008, both C.F. Os Belenenses and FC Rapid București tried to sign him on loan; however, he refused, choosing to stay at Porto and fight for a place, but did not appear in a single competitive game throughout the 2008–09 season.

Adriano became a free agent in late August 2009, and soon moved to S.C. Braga on a one-year contract. He featured rarely for the second-placed team, being released in June 2010 and returning to his country, where he all but competed in the lower leagues and amateur football (with the exception of one year back in Europe with U.D. Oliveirense).

== Honours ==
Palmeiras

- Torneio Rio-São Paulo: 2000
- Copa dos Campeões: 2000

Porto

- Primeira Liga: 2005–06, 2006–07, 2007–08
- Taça de Portugal: 2005–06
- Supertaça Cândido de Oliveira: 2006
