= 2009–10 FC Porto season =

Porto
2009–10 season
- Chairman: Jorge Nuno Pinto da Costa
- Manager: Jesualdo Ferreira
- Primeira Liga: 3rd
- Taça de Portugal: Winners
- Taça da Liga: Final
- Supertaça Cândido de Oliveira: Winners
- UEFA Champions League: Round of 16
- Top goalscorer: League: Radamel Falcao (25); All: Radamel Falcao (34)
Home colours	Away colours

The 2009–10 season is Futebol Clube do Porto's 76th season in the Primeira Liga, officially known as the Liga Sagres for sponsorship reasons. Porto won their fourth consecutive title last season and will be aiming to match their national record of winning five titles in a row. They are also the current Taça de Portugal holders after defeating Paços de Ferreira 1–0 last season at the Estádio do Jamor.

== Club ==
=== Technical staff ===
Position	Staff
Head Coach	(Portugal) Jesualdo Ferreira
Assistant Coach	(Portugal) José Gomes (Portugal) João Pinto (Portugal) Rui Barros
Goalkeeping Coach	(Netherlands) Wil Coort

Last updated: 19 June
Source: FCPorto.pt

=== Medical Staff ===
Position	Staff
Doctor	(Portugal) José Carlos Esteves (Portugal) Nélson Puga
Nurse	(Portugal) José Mário (Portugal) Eduardo Braga (Portugal) José Luís
Physioterapist	(Portugal) Ângelo Castro

Last updated: 19 June
Source: FCPorto.pt

=== Board of directors ===
Position	Staff
President	(Portugal) Jorge Nuno Pinto da Costa
Vice-President	(Portugal) Reinaldo Teles
Chief Administrative	(Portugal) Adelino Caldeira
Chief Executive	(Portugal) Antero Henrique
Chief Financial	(Portugal) Angelino Ferreira

Last updated: 4 February
Source: FC Porto.pt

=== Kit ===
Supplier: Nike
Sponsor(s): tmn, meo, Super Bock

Home	Away	Gk Home	Gk Away

Last updated: 20 July 2009.
Source: FCPorto.pt

=== Other information ===
Public Affairs	(Portugal) Rui Cerqueira
Club Ambassador	(Portugal) Vítor Baía
Ground (capacity and dimensions)	Estádio do Dragão (50,818 / 105m x 68m)

== Squad ==
=== Players ===
As of 3 February 2009. Note: Flags indicate national team as defined under FIFA eligibility rules; some limited exceptions apply. Players may hold more than one non-FIFA nationality.

No.	Pos.	Nation	Player
1	GK	BRA	Helton
2	DF	POR	Bruno Alves (captain)
3	MF	POR	Raul Meireles
4	DF	SRB	Milan Stepanov
5	DF	URU	Jorge Fucile
6	MF	COL	Fredy Guarín
7	MF	ARG	Fernando Belluschi
8	MF	ARG	Diego Valeri
9	FW	COL	Radamel Falcao
10	MF	URU	Cristian Rodríguez
11	MF	ARG	Mariano González
12	FW	BRA	Hulk
14	DF	POR	Rolando
15	DF	URU	Álvaro Pereira

No.	Pos.	Nation	Player
16	DF	BRA	Maicon
17	FW	POR	Silvestre Varela
18	DF	POR	Nuno André Coelho
19	FW	ARG	Ernesto Farías
20	MF	ARG	Tomás Costa
21	DF	GHA	David Addy
22	DF	POR	Miguel Lopes
24	GK	POR	Beto
25	MF	BRA	Fernando
28	MF	POR	Rúben Micael
29	FW	POR	Orlando Sá
31	GK	POL	Paweł Kieszek
33	GK	POR	Nuno

=== Transfers ===
==== In ====
Date	Pos.	Name	From	Fee
1 July 2009	DF	(Portugal) Miguel Lopes	(Portugal) Rio Ave	€600,000 (50%)
1 July 2009	FW	(Portugal) Silvestre Varela	(Portugal) Estrela da Amadora	Free
1 July 2009	FW	(Portugal) Orlando Sá	(Portugal) Braga	Undisclosed
1 July 2009	DF	(Brazil) Maicon	(Portugal) Nacional	€1,100,000
1 July 2009	DF	(Uruguay) Álvaro Pereira	(Romania) CFR Cluj	€4,500,000 (80%)
1 July 2009	GK	(Portugal) Beto	(Portugal) Leixões	€750,000
6 July 2009	MF	(Argentina) Fernando Belluschi	(Greece) Olympiacos	€5,000,000 (50%)
15 July 2009	FW	(Colombia) Radamel Falcao	(Argentina) River Plate	€3,930,000 (60%)
15 July 2009	MF	(Argentina) Diego Valeri	(Argentina) Lanús	€2,300,000 (loan)
23 July 2009	MF	(Argentina) Sebastián Prediguer	(Argentina) Colón	€3,300,000
18 January 2010	MF	(Portugal) Rúben Micael	(Portugal) Nacional	€3,400,000
1 February 2010	DF	(Ghana) David Addy	(Denmark) Randers	

Total spending: ▼€24,900,000

==== Out ====
Date	Pos.	Name	To	Fee
6 July 2008	MF	(Brazil) Paulo Assunção	(Spain) Atlético Madrid	€3,500,000
30 June 2009	MF	(Brazil) Diego	(Italy) Juventus	€250,000 (1%)
30 June 2009	MF	(Portugal) Paulo Machado	(France) Toulouse	€3,500,000
30 June 2009	DF	(Angola) Pedro Emanuel	Unattached	Retired
30 June 2009	MF	(Morocco) Tarik Sektioui	(United Arab Emirates) Ajman Club	Free
30 June 2009	MF	(Argentina) Lucho González	(France) Marseille	€18,000,000 ^{(€6,000,000 bonus)}
7 July 2009	FW	(Argentina) Lisandro López	(France) Lyon	€24,000,000 ^{(€4,000,000 bonus)}
11 July 2009	MF	(Portugal) Bruno Gama	(Portugal) Rio Ave	Free
11 July 2009	MF	(Portugal) Vieirinha	(Greece) PAOK	€300,000
15 July 2009	MF	(Brazil) Ibson	(Russia) Spartak Moscow	€5,000,000
17 July 2009	GK	(Portugal) Ruca	(Portugal) Marítimo	Free
18 July 2009	DF	(France) Aly Cissokho	(France) Lyon	€15,000,000
22 July 2009	MF	(Poland) Przemysław Kaźmierczak	(Portugal) Vitória de Setúbal	Free
4 August 2009	DF	(Portugal) João Paulo	(France) Le Mans	€1,500,000
18 August 2009	FW	(Portugal) Ivanildo	(Portugal) Portimonense	Free
24 August 2009	FW	(Brazil) Adriano	(Portugal) Braga	Free
18 January 2010	MF	(Argentina) Mario Bolatti	(Italy) Fiorentina	€3,500,000

Total income: ▲€74,550,000

==== Loan out ====
Date From	Date To	Pos.	Name	Moving To
1 July 2009	30 June 2010	FW	(Portugal) Rui Pedro	(Portugal) Gil Vicente
6 July 2009	30 June 2010	DF	(Portugal) Bernardo Tengarrinha	(Portugal) Olhanense
6 July 2009	30 June 2010	MF	(Portugal) Hugo Ventura	(Portugal) Olhanense
6 July 2009	30 June 2010	MF	(Portugal) André Castro	(Portugal) Olhanense
6 July 2009	30 June 2010	FW	(Portugal) Rabiola	(Portugal) Olhanense
7 July 2009	30 June 2010	DF	(Portugal) André Pinto	(Portugal) Vitória de Setúbal
10 July 2009	30 June 2010	DF	(Portugal) Nuno Coelho	(Spain) Villarreal
10 July 2009	30 June 2010	MF	(Portugal) Daniel Candeias	(Spain) Recreativo de Huelva
16 July 2009	30 June 2010	MF	(Portugal) Hélder Barbosa	(Portugal) Vitória de Setúbal
20 July 2009	30 June 2010	MF	(Portugal) Pelé	(Spain) Real Valladolid
31 January 2010	30 June 2010	FW	(Colombia) Wason Rentería	(Portugal) Braga
22 July 2009	30 June 2010	MF	(Brazil) Pitbull	(Portugal) Marítimo
25 July 2009	30 June 2010	DF	(Serbia) Milan Stepanov	(Spain) Málaga
17 August 2009	30 June 2010	DF	(Argentina) Nelson Benítez	(Portugal) Leixões
31 January 2010	30 June 2010	DF	(Romania) Cristian Săpunaru	(Romania) Rapid București
27 January 2010	30 June 2010	MF	(Argentina) Sebastián Prediguer	(Argentina) Boca Juniors

== Statistics ==
=== Squad statistics ===
Last updated on 22 February 2010.

No.	Pos	Nat	Player	Total		Primeira Liga		Champions League		Taça de Portugal		Taça da Liga	
No.	Pos	Nat	Player	Apps	Goals	Apps	Goals	Apps	Goals	Apps	Goals	Apps	Goals
1	GK	(Brazil) BRA	Helton	25	-17	19+0	-14	6+0	-3	0+0	0	0+0	0
2	DF	(Portugal) POR	Bruno Alves	29	4	19+0	3	7+0	1	2+0	0	1+0	0
3	MF	(Portugal) POR	Raul Meireles	26	2	17+0	1	7+0	0	2+0	1	0+0	0
6	MF	(Colombia) COL	Fredy Guarín	24	0	2+11	0	2+4	0	0+1	0	2+2	0
7	MF	(Argentina) ARG	Fernando Belluschi	24	2	15+2	1	3+1	0	1+0	0	2+0	1
8	MF	(Argentina) ARG	Diego Valeri	13	0	0+6	0	1+1	0	2+0	0	3+0	0
9	FW	(Colombia) COL	Radamel Falcao	42	34	28	25	8	4	5	5	0+1	0
10	MF	(Uruguay) URU	Cristian Rodríguez	22	3	7+6	2	5+0	0	3+0	1	0+1	0
11	MF	(Argentina) ARG	Mariano González	27	3	11+4	1	3+1	0	2+2	1	4+0	1
12	FW	(Brazil) BRA	Hulk	21	7	12+1	2	6+1	3	1+0	2	0+0	0
13	DF	(Uruguay) URU	Jorge Fucile	27	1	19+0	0	4+0	0	3+0	1	1+0	0
14	DF	(Portugal) POR	Rolando	29	5	19+0	2	6+0	1	3+0	2	1+0	0
15	DF	(Uruguay) URU	Álvaro Pereira	31	1	18+0	1	7+0	0	3+0	0	2+1	0
16	DF	(Brazil) BRA	Maicon	10	0	2+1	0	1+0	0	2+0	0	3+1	0
17	FW	(Portugal) POR	Silvestre Varela	24	11	12+3	8	2+2	1	3+0	1	1+1	1
18	DF	(Portugal) POR	Nuno André Coelho	5	0	0+0	0	0+0	0	1+0	0	4+0	0
19	FW	(Argentina) ARG	Ernesto Farías	22	7	3+12	5	0+4	0	1+1	2	1+0	0
20	MF	(Argentina) ARG	Tomás Costa	19	1	2+8	1	1+2	0	1+1	0	4+0	0
21	DF	(Romania) ROU	Cristian Săpunaru	9	0	4+1	0	2+2	0	0+0	0	0+0	0
22	DF	(Portugal) POR	Miguel Lopes	7	0	2+1	0	0+0	0	0+0	0	4+0	0
24	GK	(Portugal) POR	Beto	6	-6	1+0	-1	1+0	-1	4+0	-4	0+0	0
25	MF	(Brazil) BRA	Fernando	27	0	18+0	0	6+0	0	3+0	0	0+0	0
26	MF	(Argentina) ARG	Sebastián Prediguer	3	0	0+0	0	0+0	0	1+0	0	2+0	0
28	MF	(Portugal) POR	Rúben Micael	8	0	4+0	0	1+0	0	1+0	0	1+1	0
29	FW	(Portugal) POR	Orlando Sá	7	1	0+2	0	0+0	0	1+0	0	2+2	1
33	GK	(Portugal) POR	Nuno	4	0	0+0	0	0+0	0	0+0	0	4+0	0
45	MF	(Portugal) POR	Sérgio Oliveira	3	0	0+0	0	0+0	0	0+0	0	0+3	0
	DF	(Ghana) GHA	David Addy	0	0	0+0	0	0+0	0	0+0	0	0+0	0

=== Top scorers ===
Last updated on 22 February

Position	Nation	Number	Name	Primeira Liga	Champions League	Taça de Portugal	Taça da Liga	Total
1	(Colombia)	9	Radamel Falcao	16	4	3	0	23
2	(Portugal)	17	Silvestre Varela	8	1	1	1	11
3	(Brazil)	12	Hulk	2	3	2	0	7
=	(Argentina)	19	Ernesto Farías	5	0	2	0	7
5	(Portugal)	14	Rolando	2	1	2	0	5
6	(Portugal)	2	Bruno Alves	3	1	0	0	4
/	/	/	Own goals	3	1	0	0	4

=== Disciplinary record ===
Last updated on 22 February

Position	Nation	Number	Name	Primeira Liga		Champions League		Taça de Portugal		Taça da Liga		Total	
Position	Nation	Number	Name	Booked	Sent off (straight red)	Booked	Sent off (straight red)	Booked	Sent off (straight red)	Booked	Sent off (straight red)	Booked	Sent off (straight red)
GK	(Brazil)	1	Helton	0	0	1	0	0	0	0	0	1	0
DF	(Portugal)	2	Bruno Alves	5	0	1	0	1	0	0	0	7	0
MF	(Portugal)	3	Raul Meireles	6	0	1	0	2	0	0	0	9	0
MF	(Colombia)	6	Fredy Guarín	1	0	1	0	0	0	1	0	3	0
FW	(Colombia)	9	Radamel Falcao	3	0	0	0	0	0	0	0	3	0
MF	(Uruguay)	10	Cristian Rodríguez	1	0	0	0	2	1	1	0	4	1
MF	(Argentina)	11	Mariano González	2	0	0	1	0	0	0	0	2	1
FW	(Brazil)	12	Hulk	3	1	1	0	0	0	0	0	4	1
DF	(Uruguay)	13	Jorge Fucile	2	0	1	0	1	0	0	0	4	0
DF	(Portugal)	14	Rolando	1	0	0	0	2	0	0	0	3	0
DF	(Uruguay)	15	Álvaro Pereira	5	0	2	0	1	0	1	0	9	0
DF	(Brazil)	16	Maicon	1	0	0	0	0	0	0	0	1	0
DF	(Portugal)	17	Silvestre Varela	0	0	0	0	1	0	0	0	1	0
MF	(Argentina)	20	Tomás Costa	2	0	0	0	0	0	1	0	3	0
DF	(Romania)	21	Cristian Săpunaru	1	0	0	0	0	0	0	0	1	0
DF	(Portugal)	22	Miguel Lopes	0	0	0	0	0	0	1	0	1	0
GK	(Portugal)	24	Beto	1	0	0	0	0	0	0	0	1	0
MF	(Brazil)	25	Fernando	6	0	4	1	1	0	0	0	11	1
MF	(Portugal)	28	Rúben Micael	2	0	0	0	0	0	0	0	2	0
			TOTALS	42	1	12	2	11	1	4	0	69	4

=== Start formations ===
Qnt	Formation	Match(es)
12	4–3–3	1–10 Primeira Liga, 1–3 UEFA Champions League, 1 Taça de Portugal

Last updated: 24 November
Source: Match reports in Competitive matches
Only competitive matches.

=== Starting 11 ===
No.	Pos.	Nat.	Name	MS	Notes
1	GK	(Brazil)	Helton	25	
13	DF	(Uruguay)	Fucile	27	
2	DF	(Portugal)	Alves	29	
14	DF	(Portugal)	Rolando	29	
15	DF	(Uruguay)	Pereira	30	
27	MF	(Brazil)	Fernando	24	
3	MF	(Portugal)	Meireles	26	
7	MF	(Argentina)	Belluschi	21	Rúben Micael has 7 starts
12	FW	(Brazil)	Hulk	19	
9	FW	(Colombia)	Falcao	26	
11	FW	(Argentina)	González	20	Varela has 18 starts

Last updated: 2010-02-10
Source: Squad stats and Start formations.
Only competitive matches.
Using the most used start formation.
Ordered by position on pitch (from back right to front left).

== Pre-season ==
=== Fixtures ===
Game	Date	Competition	Venue	Opponent	Result F–A	Attendance	Man of the Match
1	11 July	Friendly	CTFD PortoGaia	Tourizense	3–1	0	Hulk
2	15 July	Friendly	Municipal de Aveiro	Leixões	3–1	13,032	Hulk
3	18 July	Friendly	Estádio do Dragão	Monaco	3–0	38,211	Pereira
4	23 July	Friendly	Municipal de Albufeira	Dinamo București	1–0	6,000	Varela
5	27 July	Peace Cup	Nuevo Colombino	Lyon	0–2		Hulk
6	29 July	Peace Cup	Ramón Sánchez Pizjuán	Beşiktaş	0–0
7	31 July	Peace Cup	La Rosaleda	Aston Villa	1–2
8	9 August	Supertaça Cândido de Oliveira	Municipal de Aveiro	Paços de Ferreira	2–0	15,722	Farías

=== Peace Cup ===
Group D

Team	Pld	W	D	L	GF	GA	GD	Pts	POR	BEŞ	LYO
Porto	2	1	1	0	2	0	+2	4			2–0
Beşiktaş	2	0	2	0	1	1	0	2	0–0		
Lyon	2	0	1	1	1	3	−2	1		1–1	

Legend: Blue = home team win; Yellow = draw; Red = away team win.

27 July 2009 Match 1	Lyon	0–2	Porto	Huelva
22:30 (CEST)		Report	Hulk 9', 75'	Stadium: Estadio Nuevo Colombino; Referee: Eduardo Iturralde González (Spain)

29 July 2009 Match 2	Beşiktaş	0–0	Porto	Huelva
22:30 (CEST)	Sivok (yellow card) 29'; Hološko (yellow card) 65'	Report	Lopes (yellow card) 54'; Belluschi (yellow card) 66'; Hulk (yellow card) 90+3'	Stadium: Estadio Nuevo Colombino; Attendance: 500; Referee: Michael Koukoulakis (Greece)

Semi-final

31 July 2009
20:30 (CEST)

Porto	1–2	Aston Villa
Hulk 90' (pen.)	Report	Heskey 14'; Sidwell 37'

La Rosaleda, Málaga
Referee: Michael Koukoulakis (Greece)

== Overall ==
Competition	Started round	Current position / round	Final position / round	First match	Last match
Supertaça Cândido de Oliveira	—	—	Winner	9 August	
Primeira Liga	—	3rd		13 August	9 May
UEFA Champions League	Group stage	Round of 16		15 September	
Taça de Portugal	Third Round	Semi-finals		17 October	
Taça da Liga	Third Round	Final		5 January	20 March

Updated to match played 10 February
Source: Competitions

== Supertaça Cândido de Oliveira ==
9 August 2009
20:45 GMT

Porto (Portugal)	2–0	(Portugal) Paços de Ferreira
Farías 59'; Alves 89'	Report

Municipal de Aveiro, Aveiro
Attendance: 15722
Referee: Jorge Sousa

== Primeira Liga ==
=== Table ===
Pos	Team	Pld	W	D	L	GF	GA	GD	Pts	Qualification or relegation
1	Benfica (C)	30	24	4	2	78	20	+58	76	Qualification to Champions League group stage
2	Braga	30	22	5	3	48	20	+28	71	Qualification to Champions League third qualifying round
3	Porto	30	21	5	4	70	26	+44	68	Qualification to Europa League play-off round (Note: Porto qualified for the play-off round of 2010–11 UEFA Europa League after winning the 2009–10 Taça de Portugal.)
4	Sporting CP	30	13	9	8	42	26	+16	48	Qualification to Europa League third qualifying round
5	Marítimo	30	11	8	11	42	43	−1	41 (Note: Marítimo ahead of Vitória de Guimarães on head-to-head record; Vitória de Guimarães–Marítimo 1–2, Marítimo–Vitória de Guimarães 0–1.)	Qualification to Europa League second qualifying round

Source: LPFP
Rules for classification: 1) points; 2) head-to-head points; 3) head-to-head goal difference; 4) head-to-head goals scored; 5) goal difference; 6) number of goals scored.
(C) Champions

=== Results ===
Summary

Overall								Home						Away					
Pld	W	D	L	GF	GA	GD	Pts	W	D	L	GF	GA	GD	W	D	L	GF	GA	GD
20	13	4	3	43	15	+28	43	9	2	0	28	9	+19	4	2	3	15	6	+9

Last updated: 22 February.
Source: Liga Sagres

By Round

Round	1	2	3	4	5	6	7	8	9	10	11	12	13	14	15	16	17	18	19	20	21	22	23	24	25	26	27	28	29	30
Ground	A	H	A	H	A	H	A	H	H	A	H	A	H	A	H	H	A	H	A	H	A	H	A	A	H	A	H	A	H	A
Result	D	W	W	W	L	W	W	W	D	L	W	W	W	L	W	D	W	W	D	W										
Position	5	4	3	3	3	3	3	3	3	3	3	3	3	3	3	3	3	3	3	3										

Updated to match(es) played on 7 February. Source: Matches
A = Away; H = Home; W = Win; D = Draw; L = Loss

=== Matches ===
16 August 2009
18:00 GMT

Paços de Ferreira	1–1	Porto
Fucile 11' (o.g.); Danielson (yellow card) 53'; William (yellow card) 56'	(Report)	Hulk (yellow card) 17' (yellow-red card) 55'; Falcao 79'; González (yellow card) 90'

Estádio da Mata Real, Paços de Ferreira
Attendance: 4,654
Referee: Carlos Xistra

23 August 2009
20:15 GMT

Porto	3–0	Nacional
Meireles (yellow card) 21'; Falcao 68' (pen.); Rolando 78'; Rodríguez 86'	(Report)	Cléber (yellow card) 40' (yellow-red card) 64'; Patacas (yellow card) 64'

Estádio do Dragão, Porto
Attendance: 40,309
Referee: João Ferreira

29 August 2009
21:15 GMT

Naval	1–3	Porto
Ouattara (yellow card) 65'; Rolando 75' (o.g.)	(Report)	Falcao 8'; Varela 61'; Farías 77'

Estádio Municipal José Bento Pessoa, Figueira da Foz
Attendance: 4,261
Referee: Elmano Santos

12 September 2009
19:00 GMT

Porto	4–1	Leixões
Varela 20'; Hulk 23' (pen.); Fernando (yellow card) 28'; Rolando 32'; Falcao 41'	(Report)	Laranjeiro (yellow card) 22'; Morais (yellow card) 23'; Faioli (yellow card) 52'; Pouga 76'

Estádio do Dragão, Porto
Attendance: 38,117
Referee: Vasco Santos

21 September 2009
21:15 GMT

Braga	1–0	Porto
Mossoró (yellow card) 36'; Pereira (yellow card) 45'; Alan 69'; Matheus (yellow card) 82'	(Report)	Falcao (yellow card) 26'; Hulk (yellow card) 28'

Estádio AXA, Braga
Attendance: 17,215
Referee: Pedro Proença

26 September 2009
19:15 GMT

Porto	1–0	Sporting CP
Falcao 3'; Meireles (yellow card) 12'; Alves (yellow card) 56'; Fucile (yellow card) 65'; Costa (yellow card) 78'	(Report)	Veloso (yellow card) 26' (red card) 90+2'; Polga (yellow card) 34' (yellow-red card) 52'; Abel (yellow card) 36'

Estádio do Dragão, Porto
Attendance: 46,511
Referee: Duarte Gomes

4 October 2009
20:15 GMT

Olhanense	0–3	Porto
Duarte (yellow card) 52'; Guga (yellow card) 78'	(Report)	Falcao 13', 84'; Pereira (yellow card) 37'; Alves 45'; Guarín (yellow card) 78'

Estádio José Arcanjo, Olhão
Attendance: 7,987
Referee: Pedro Henriques

25 October 2009
20:15 GMT

Porto	3–2	Académica
González 64'; Alves (yellow card) 66'; Farías 67', 81'	(Report)	Coelho (yellow card) 70'; Pedro 76'; Berger (yellow card) 86'; Sougou 90+2'

Estádio do Dragão, Porto
Attendance: 29,209
Referee: Hugo Miguel

30 October 2009
20:15 GMT

Porto	1–1	Belenenses
Farías 62'; Alves (yellow card) 74'	(Report)	Lima (yellow card) 45+1'; Santos (yellow card) 64'; Nélson (yellow card) 84'

Estádio do Dragão, Porto
Attendance: 31,819
Referee: Olegário Benquerença

11 November 2009
18:00 GMT

Marítimo	1–0	Porto
Rolando 29' (o.g.); Diawara (yellow card) 56'; Sousa (yellow card) 90+1'	(Report)	Săpunaru (yellow card) 73'; Pereira (yellow card) 75'; Costa (yellow card) 85'

Estádio dos Barreiros, Funchal
Attendance: 4,900
Referee: Paulo Baptista

29 November 2009
20:45 GMT

Porto	2–1	Rio Ave
Hulk 23'; Pereira (yellow card) 69'; Varela 81'; Maicon (yellow card) 85'; Beto (yellow card) 90+3'	(Report)	Sílvio 11'; Tomás 25'; José Gaspar (yellow card) 37'; Gama (yellow card) 73'; Carlos (yellow card) 77'; Tarantini (yellow card) 80'

Estádio do Dragão, Porto
Attendance: 22,512
Referee: Paulo Costa

4 December 2009
20:15 GMT

Vitória de Guimarães	1–4	Porto
Andrezinho 45+1'; Serginho (yellow card) 50'; Douglas (yellow card) 50'; Assiss (yellow card) 90+3'	(Report)	Varela 10'; Falcao 31'; Meireles (yellow card) 40'; Fernando (yellow card) 44'; Alves 66'; Rodríguez 87'

Estádio D. Afonso Henriques, Guimarães
Attendance: 18,110
Referee: Jorge Sousa

13 December 2009
20:15 GMT

Porto	2–0	Vitória de Setúbal
Farías 10'; Varela 31'	(Report)	Lima (yellow card) 26'; Zoro (yellow card) 36'

Estádio do Dragão, Porto
Attendance: 32,519
Referee: Pedro Henriques

20 December 2009
20:15 GMT

Benfica	1–0	Porto
Saviola 22', (yellow card) 43'; David Luiz (yellow card) 25'; Pereira (yellow card) 86'	(Report)	Falcao (yellow card) 68'; Fernando (yellow card) 80'; Alves (yellow card) 86'; Rodríguez (yellow card) 86'

Estádio da Luz, Lisbon
Attendance: Lucílio Baptista
Referee: 58,659

10 January
20:15 GMT

Porto	3–2	União de Leiria
Falcao 15', 64'; Alves 37'; Fernando (yellow card) 90' (yellow-red card) 90+1'	(Report)	Diego Gaúcho 31'; Ronny 52', (yellow card) 65'; Vinícius (yellow card) 59'; (yellow card) 65'; Ðuričić (red card)

Estádio do Dragão, Porto
Attendance: 24,209
Referee: Elmano Santos

16 January 2010
19:15 GMT

Porto	1–1	Paços de Ferreira
Meireles (yellow card) 78'; Falcao 85'; Guarín (yellow card) 90+4'; Alves (yellow card) 90+4'	(Report)	Danielson (yellow card) 11'; Ozéia (yellow card) 58' (yellow-red card) 88'; Pedrinha (yellow card) 59'; Maykon 82'; William (yellow card) 88'; Cássio (yellow card) 90+2'

Estádio do Dragão, Porto
Attendance: 26,706
Referee: Rui Costa

30 January 2010
17:00 GMT

Nacional	0–4	Porto
Alex Bruno (yellow card) 9' (yellow-red card) 28'; Patacas (yellow card) 76'; Luís Alberto (yellow card) 77'	(Report)	Varela 30' (pen.), 84'; Falcao 54', 61'; González (yellow card) 54'; Fernando (yellow card) 68'

Estádio da Madeira, Funchal
Attendance: 3,204
Referee: Carlos Xistra

7 February 2010
20:15 GMT

Porto	3–0	Naval
Costa 39'; Falcao (yellow card) 68', (goal) 79'; Pereira (yellow card) 78'; Varela 88'	(Report)	Hauw (yellow card) 25'; Cruz (yellow card) 68'

Estádio do Dragão, Porto
Referee: Hugo Miguel

13 February 2010
21:15 GMT

Leixões	0–0	Porto
Zé Manel (yellow card) 7'; Pouga (yellow card) 71'; Nélson (yellow card) 71'; Tavares (yellow card) 75'	(Report)	Rúben Micael (yellow card) 31'; Rolando (yellow card) 54'

Estádio do Mar, Porto
Attendance: 4,802
Referee: Bruno Paixão

21 February 2010
20:15 GMT

Porto	5–1	Braga
Meireles 15', (yellow card) 39'; Pereira 34'; Falcao 35', 72'; Fucile (yellow card) 50'; Belluschi 83'	(Report)	Mossoró (yellow card) 8'; Paulo César (yellow card) 53'; Paulão (yellow card) 54'; Oliveira (yellow card) 58'; Bastos (yellow card) 84'; Alan 90+1'

Estádio do Dragão, Porto
Attendance: 46,403
Referee: Olegário Benquerença

== UEFA Champions League ==
=== Group stage ===
Pos	Team	Pld	W	D	L	GF	GA	GD	Pts	Qualification	CHE	POR	ATM	APO
1	(England) Chelsea	6	4	2	0	11	4	+7	14	Advance to knockout phase	—	1–0	4–0	2–2
2	(Portugal) Porto	6	4	0	2	8	3	+5	12	Advance to knockout phase	0–1	—	2–0	2–1
3	(Spain) Atlético Madrid	6	0	3	3	3	12	−9	3	Transfer to Europa League	2–2	0–3	—	0–0
4	(Cyprus) APOEL	6	0	3	3	4	7	−3	3		0–1	0–1	1–1	—

Source: RSSSF
15 September 2009
19:45 GMT

Chelsea (England)	1–0	(Portugal) Porto
Essien (yellow card) 15'; Malouda (yellow card) 18'; Anelka 48'	(Report)	Fernando (yellow card) 78' (yellow-red card) 90'

Stamford Bridge, London
Attendance: 41,597
Referee: Konrad Plautz (Austria)

30 September 2009
20:45

Porto (Portugal)	2–0	(Spain) Atlético Madrid
Falcao 75'; Rolando 82'	(Report)	Assunção (yellow card) 36'; Perea (yellow card) 48'

Estádio do Dragão, Porto
Attendance: 37,609
Referee: Nicola Rizzoli (Italy)

21 October 2009
20:45

Porto (Portugal)	2–1	(Cyprus) APOEL
Hulk 33', 48' (pen.); González (red card) 73'; Helton (yellow card) 90+1'	(Report)	Pereira 22' (o.g.); Satsias (yellow card) 23'; Grnčarov (yellow card) 36'; Breška (yellow card) 55'; Broerse (yellow card) 81'

Estádio do Dragão, Porto
Attendance: 31,212
Referee: Felix Brych (Germany)

3 November 2009
20:45

APOEL (Cyprus)	0–1	(Portugal) Porto
Charalambides (yellow card) 51'; Elia (yellow card) 52'; Pinto (yellow card) 74'	(Report)	Falcao 83'; Pereira (yellow card) 86'

GSP Stadium, Nicosia
Attendance: 20,825
Referee: Damir Skomina (Slovenia)

25 November 2009
20:45

Porto (Portugal)	0–1	(England) Chelsea
Fernando (yellow card) 51'; Meireles (yellow card) 79'	(Report)	Ballack (yellow card) 58'; Anelka 69'

Estádio do Dragão, Porto
Attendance: 38,410
Referee: Jonas Eriksson (Sweden)

8 December 2009
20:45

Atlético Madrid (Spain)	0–3	(Portugal) Porto
Simão (yellow card) 43'; Agüero (yellow card) 44'; Juanito (yellow card) 88'	(Report)	Alves 1'; Falcao 14'; Hulk 76'; Guarín (yellow card) 72'

Vicente Calderón, Madrid
Attendance: 24,603
Referee: Stéphane Lannoy (France)

=== First knockout round ===
==== First leg ====
17 February 2010
19:45 GMT

Porto (Portugal)	2–1	(England) Arsenal
Varela 11'; Falcao 51'	(Report)	Campbell 18'

Estádio do Dragão, Porto
Attendance: 40,717
Referee: Martin Hansson (Sweden)

==== Second leg ====
9 March 2010
19:45 GMT

Arsenal (England)	5–0	(Portugal) Porto
Bendtner 10', 25', 90+1', (yellow card) 44'; Vermaelen (yellow card) 38'; Nasri 63'; Eboué 66'	Report	Falcao (yellow card) 24'; Pereira (yellow card) 59'; Fucile (yellow card) 90'

Emirates Stadium, London
Referee: Frank De Bleeckere (Belgium)

Arsenal advances 6–2 on aggregate.

== Taça de Portugal ==
=== Third round ===
17 October 2009
20:15 GMT

Porto	4–0	Sertanense
Hulk 5', 87'; Farías 10', 39' (pen.)	(Report)

Estádio do Dragão, Porto
Attendance: 30,000
Referee: João Capela

=== Fourth round ===
2 January 2010
20:15 GMT

Oliveirense	0–2	Porto
	(Report)	Fernando (yellow card); Meireles 43', (yellow card) 69'; Rolando 64'

Estádio Municipal de Águeda, Águeda
Referee: Carlos Xistra

=== Fifth round ===
20 January 2010
20:45 GMT

Belenenses	2–2	Porto
Lima 13', 80'; Pelé (yellow card) 9'; Dević (yellow card) 24'; Barge (yellow card) 42'; Gómez (yellow card) 55'; Celestino (yellow card) 106'	(Report)	Falcao 15'; Rodríguez 85', (yellow card) 23' (yellow-red card) 89'; Fucile (yellow card) 45+1'; Meireles (yellow card) 61'; Pereira (yellow card) 118'
Penalties
	9–10

Estádio do Restelo, Lisbon
Attendance: 4,000
Referee: Olegário Benquerença

=== Quarter-finals ===
2 February 2010
20:45 GMT

Porto	5–2	Sporting CP
Rolando 19', (yellow card) 32'; Falcao 34', 42'; Varela 48', (yellow card) 48'; González 57'	(Report)	Izmailov 22'; A. Silva (yellow card) 23'; Grimi (yellow card) 31'; Carriço (yellow card) 38'

Estádio do Dragão, Porto
Attendance: 36,614
Referee: Paulo Baptista

=== Semi-finals ===
==== First leg ====
24 March 2010
GMT

Rio Ave	–	Porto

Estádio dos Arcos, Vila do Conde

==== Second leg ====
14 April 2010
GMT

Porto	4–0	Rio Ave

Estádio do Dragão, Porto

== Taça da Liga ==
=== Third round ===
Pos	Team	Pld	W	D	L	GF	GA	GD	Pts	Qualification
1	Porto	3	2	1	0	3	0	+3	7	Advance to knockout phase
2	Académica	3	2	1	0	3	1	+2	7	Advance to knockout phase
3	Leixões	3	0	1	2	1	3	−2	1	
4	Estoril	3	0	1	2	2	5	−3	1	

=== Semi-final ===
10 February 2010
20:15 GMT

Porto	1–0	Académica
Pereira (yellow card) 26'; Guarín (yellow card) 56'; González 82'		Vouho (yellow card) 45+1'; Ribeiro (yellow card) 80'; Ricardo (yellow card) 90'; Pedrinho (yellow card) 90+3'

Estádio do Dragão, Porto
Attendance: 22,702
Referee: Pedro Proença

=== Final ===
21 March 2010
19:15 BST

Benfica	3–0	Porto
Amorim 10'; Martins 44'; Cardozo 90+2'

Estádio Algarve, Faro
Attendance: 23,430
Referee: Jorge Sousa
