= Maicon (footballer, born September 1988) =

Brazilian footballer

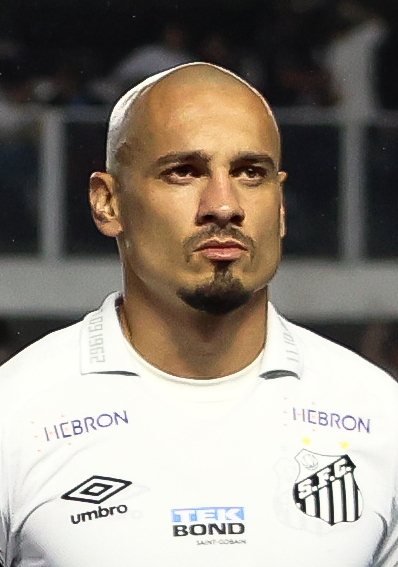
- Maicon with Santos in 2022

Personal information
- Full name: Maicon Pereira Roque
- Date of birth: 14 September 1988 (age 38)
- Place of birth: Barretos, Brazil
- Height: 1.90 m (6 ft 3 in)
- Position: Centre-back

Team information
- Current team: Coritiba
- Number: 3

Youth career
- Mamoré
- 2006–2007: Cruzeiro

Senior career*
Years	Team	Apps	(Gls)
2007–2009	Cruzeiro	1	(0)
2007	→ Cabofriense (loan)	8	(0)
2008–2009	→ Nacional (loan)	28	(0)
2009–2016	Porto	116	(11)
2013	Porto B	1	(1)
2016	→ São Paulo (loan)	18	(2)
2016–2017	São Paulo	40	(2)
2017–2020	Galatasaray	45	(6)
2019–2020	→ Al-Nassr (loan)	28	(0)
2020–2021	Al-Nassr	25	(0)
2022	Cruzeiro	3	(0)
2022–2023	Santos	34	(0)
2023–2025	Vasco da Gama	49	(1)
2025	→ Coritiba (loan)	33	(1)
2026–	Coritiba	19	(1)
- * Club domestic league appearances and goals as of 16:09, 28 September 2026 (UTC)

Maicon Pereira Roque (born 14 September 1988), known simply as Maicon, is a Brazilian professional footballer who plays as a central defender for Campeonato Brasileiro Série A club Coritiba.

He spent most of his career with Porto, appearing in 183 games and winning 11 honours, including three Primeira Liga titles and the UEFA Europa League in 2011. Previously of Nacional, he totalled 144 games in Portugal's top flight. He additionally spent two years at São Paulo, and won the Süper Lig with Turkey's Galatasaray in 2018.

== Career ==
=== Cruzeiro ===
Born in Barretos, São Paulo, Maicon started off his career with Cruzeiro. He made his first-team debut on 6 May 2007, coming on as a second-half substitute for fellow youth graduate Wellington in a 2–0 home win against rivals Atlético Mineiro in the second leg of the Campeonato Mineiro finals, lost 4–2 on aggregate.

In 2008, Maicon moved on loan to modest Cabofriense. Upon returning, he was a part of Cruzeiro's reserves that went on a trip to Portugal and played three friendlies in the country.

Maicon had his first abroad adventure in the 2008–09 campaign, being a defensive mainstay for Madeira's Nacional which again qualified for European competition.

=== Porto ===
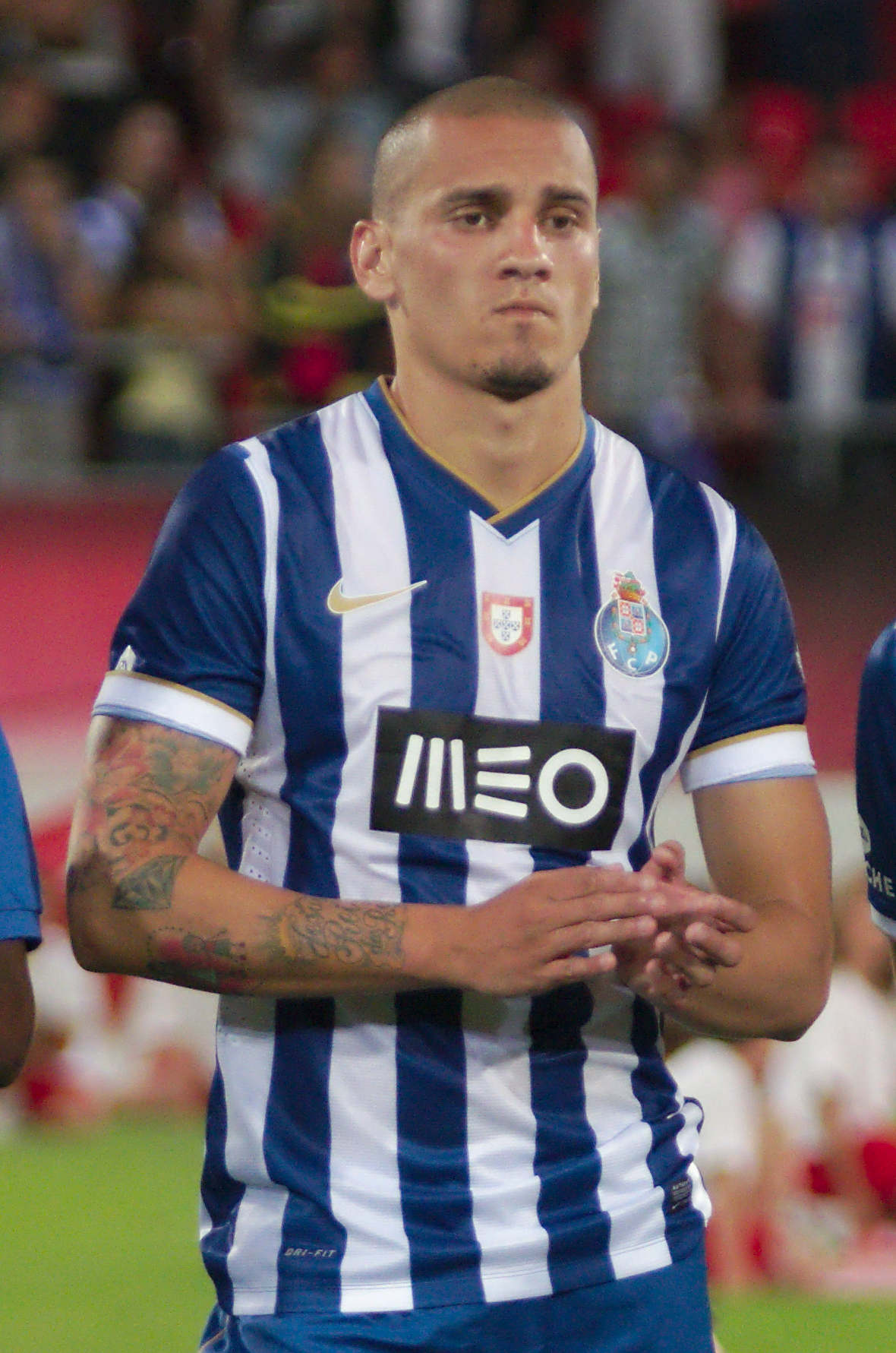
Maicon with Porto in 2013

On 4 June 2009, Maicon moved to Primeira Liga champions Porto in a contract running until 2014. He appeared in only four games in his first year, starting with a 2–1 home victory over Rio Ave on 29 November; on 24 April 2010, he scored a first goal in a 5–2 away defeat of Vitória de Setúbal.

After Bruno Alves left for Zenit, Maicon became a first-team regular in 2010–11, playing 37 competitive matches as Porto won the treble (including eight in the victorious run in the UEFA Europa League). In the following season – under new manager Vítor Pereira – after Cristian Săpunaru's injury, he beat competition from Jorge Fucile and began being often utilised as a right-back.

On 2 March 2012, after a free kick, Maicon headed a late goal in a 3–2 away win over Benfica. He scored five goals from 35 appearances over two seasons, helping his team to back-to-back national championships; in October he was awarded the Dragão de Ouro as the club's Player of the Year.

Maicon made his only appearance for the reserves in Segunda Liga on 3 February 2013, and scored a free kick from his own half in the 3–1 home victory against Oliveirense. He headed home the 2–1 winner over Chelsea in the group stage of the UEFA Champions League on 29 September 2015, in what was his third competitive goal of the campaign.

=== São Paulo ===
On 14 February 2016, having been deemed surplus to requirements by new manager José Peseiro, Maicon was loaned to São Paulo; upon arriving, he stated that the move was "a dream come true". He made his debut in the Campeonato Paulista on 1 March in a 2–0 home win against Mogi Mirim. On 2 April, he missed a penalty before scoring the last-minute winner in a 2–1 victory over Oeste at the Estádio do Morumbi.

Maicon signed a permanent deal for R$22 million on 28 June 2016, as Porto also ceded 50% of the sporting rights to fellow defenders Inácio and Lucão.

=== Galatasaray ===
In July 2017, Maicon returned to European football, signing a four-year deal for Galatasaray for a fee of €7 million. He scored a career-best five goals – all in the first half of the campaign – as the team from Istanbul won the Süper Lig in his first season, including two on 30 September in a 3–2 home win against Kardemir Karabükspor.

=== Al-Nassr ===
On 5 February 2019, Al-Nassr paid €1.7 million to gain Maicon on loan for 18 months; the Saudi Pro League club paid a further €1.4 million to sign him permanently in August 2020. In the 2019 Saudi Super Cup on 4 January 2020, he scored the decisive attempt in the side's shootout defeat of Al Taawoun (1–1 after 120 minutes).

Maicon joined permanently in 2020, but terminated his contract on 19 June 2021.

=== Return to Cruzeiro ===
On 25 November 2021, Maicon returned to his first club Cruzeiro by agreeing to a three-year deal. However, a directorial change caused him to terminate his link after just three matches.

=== Santos ===
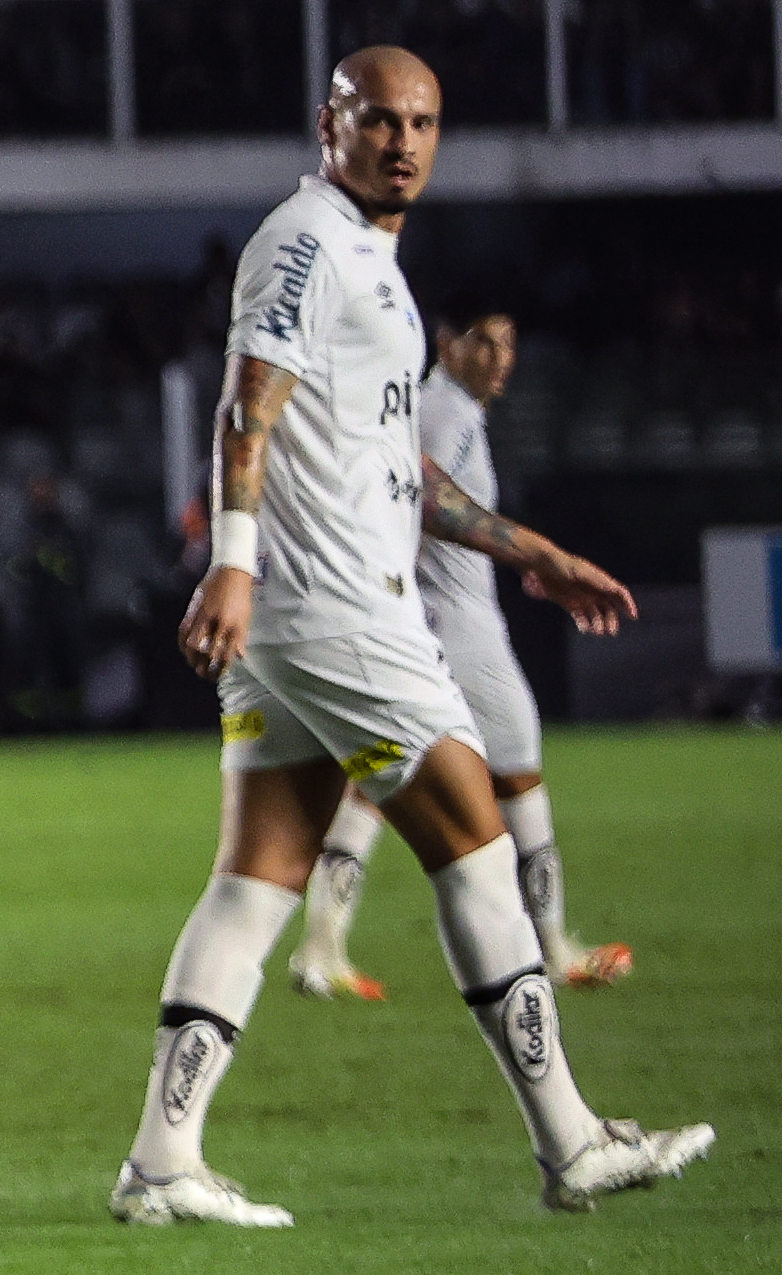
Maicon playing for Santos in 2022

On 8 March 2022, immediately after leaving Cruzeiro, Maicon signed a two-year contract with Santos. He made his debut on 5 April, starting in a 1–0 Copa Sudamericana away loss against Banfield.

A regular starter during the 2022 season, Maicon subsequently lost that status to new signings Joaquim Henrique and Messias. On 20 June 2023, he left after rescinding his contract.

=== Vasco da Gama ===
On 28 June 2023, Maicon joined Vasco da Gama on a short-term deal. In December, he agreed to a one-year extension.

== Personal life ==
Maicon hailed from a family of footballers: his father Maurides played amateur football, while his younger brothers Muller and Maurides were professionals, the former as a forward and the latter also as a stopper. Maicon faced Maurides twice in the 2015–16 season, when his sibling was a member of Arouca.

In Brazil, Maicon was given the nickname God of Zaga, due to his play and resemblance to Kratos from the videogame series God of War.

== Career statistics ==
As of 7 January 2025

Appearances and goals by club, season and competition
Club	Season	League			State League (Note: Includes Campeonato Mineiro and Campeonato Paulista)		National cup (Note: Includes Copa do Brasil, Taça de Portugal, Turkish Cup and King Cup)		League cup (Note: Includes Taça da Liga)		Continental (Note: Includes UEFA Champions League, UEFA Europa League, Copa Libertadores, AFC Champions League and Copa Sudamericana)		Other (Note: Includes UEFA Super Cup, Supertaça Cândido de Oliveira, Turkish Super Cup and Saudi Super Cup)		Total	
Club	Season	Division	Apps	Goals	Apps	Goals	Apps	Goals	Apps	Goals	Apps	Goals	Apps	Goals	Apps	Goals
Cruzeiro	2007	Série A	0	0	1	0	0	0	—		—		—		1	0
Cabofriense (loan)	2008	Carioca	—		8	0	—		—		—		—		8	0
Nacional	2008–09	Primeira Liga	28	0	—		5	0	4	0	—		—		37	0
Porto	2009–10	Primeira Liga	4	1	—		3	0	4	0	1	0	0	0	12	1
Porto	2010–11	Primeira Liga	21	2	—		5	0	2	0	8	0	1	0	37	2
Porto	2011–12	Primeira Liga	20	3	—		2	0	3	0	5	0	1	0	31	3
Porto	2012–13	Primeira Liga	15	2	—		0	0	1	0	4	0	1	0	21	2
Porto	2013–14	Primeira Liga	16	1	—		2	0	4	0	5	0	0	0	27	1
Porto	2014–15	Primeira Liga	26	0	—		2	0	0	0	11	0	0	0	39	0
Porto	2015–16	Primeira Liga	13	2	—		2	0	0	0	3	1	0	0	18	3
Porto	Total		116	11	0	0	16	0	14	0	37	1	3	0	183	12
São Paulo	2016	Série A	32	2	9	1	1	0	—		9	1	—		51	4
São Paulo	2017	Série A	7	0	10	1	4	0	—		0	0	—		21	1
São Paulo	Total		39	2	19	2	5	0	—		9	1	—		72	5
Galatasaray	2017–18	Süper Lig	30	5	—		3	0	—		2	0	—		35	5
Galatasaray	2018–19	Süper Lig	15	1	—		2	0	—		4	0	1	0	22	1
Galatasaray	Total		45	6	0	0	5	0	0	0	6	0	1	0	57	6
Al-Nassr	2018–19	Saudi Pro League	7	0	—		1	0	—		0	0	—		8	0
Al-Nassr	2019–20	Saudi Pro League	28	0	—		4	0	—		5	0	1	0	38	0
Al-Nassr	2020–21	Saudi Pro League	18	0	—		1	0	—		6	0	—		25	0
Al-Nassr	Total		53	0	0	0	6	0	0	0	11	0	1	0	71	0
Cruzeiro	2022	Série B	0	0	3	0	0	0	—		—		—		3	0
Santos	2022	Série A	23	0	—		2	0	—		3	0	—		28	0
Santos	2023	Série A	1	0	10	0	1	0	—		2	0	—		14	0
Santos	Total		24	0	10	0	3	0	0	0	5	0	0	0	42	0
Vasco da Gama	2023	Série A	16	0	—		—		—		—		—		16	0
Vasco da Gama	2024	Série A	30	1	3	0	6	0	—		—		—		39	1
Vasco da Gama	Total		46	1	3	0	6	0	0	0	11	0	0	0	55	1
Career total			351	20	44	2	46	0	18	0	68	2	5	0	529	24

== Honours ==
Porto

- Primeira Liga: 2010–11, 2011–12, 2012–13
- Taça de Portugal: 2009–10, 2010–11
- Supertaça Cândido de Oliveira: 2009, 2010, 2011, 2012, 2013
- UEFA Europa League: 2010–11
- UEFA Super Cup runner-up: 2011
- Taça da Liga runner-up: 2009–10, 2012–13

Galatasaray

- Süper Lig: 2017–18

Al-Nassr

- Saudi Pro League: 2018–19
- Saudi Super Cup: 2019

Coritiba

- Campeonato Brasileiro Série B: 2025

Individual

- FC Porto Player of the Year: 2012
