= 2010 Supertaça Cândido de Oliveira =

- Event: Supertaça Cândido de Oliveira (Portuguese Super Cup)
Porto	Benfica
2	0
- Date: 7 August 2010
- Venue: Estádio Municipal de Aveiro, Aveiro
- Man of the Match: Rolando (Porto)
- Referee: João Ferreira (Setúbal)
- Attendance: 28,000

The 2010 Supertaça Cândido de Oliveira was the 32nd edition of the Supertaça Cândido de Oliveira, the annual Portuguese football season-opening match contested by the winners of the previous season's top league and cup competitions (or cup runner-up in case the league- and cup-winning club is the same). It took place on 7 August 2010 at the Estádio Municipal de Aveiro in Aveiro, and was contested between Benfica, the 2009–10 Primeira Liga winners, and Porto, the 2009–10 Taça de Portugal winners.

Played in front of a crowd of 28,000, the Dragões defeated the Águias 2–0. Goals in either half from central defender Rolando and Radamel Falcao saw Porto defeat the Portuguese champions Benfica and thus raise the club's tally to 17 trophies in this competition.

== Match ==
=== Details ===
7 August 2010
20:45 UTC+01:00

Porto	2–0	Benfica
Rolando 3'; Falcao 67'

Estádio Municipal de Aveiro, Aveiro
Attendance: 28,000
Referee: João Ferreira (Setúbal)

Porto	Benfica

GK	1	(Brazil) Helton (c)	(yellow card) 86'
RB	21	(Romania) Cristian Săpunaru		(substituted off) 74'
CB	4	(Brazil) Maicon
CB	14	(Portugal) Rolando
LB	5	(Uruguay) Álvaro Pereira	(yellow card) 56'
DM	25	(Brazil) Fernando	(yellow card) 19'
CM	7	(Argentina) Fernando Belluschi
CM	8	(Portugal) João Moutinho	(yellow card) 76'	(substituted off) 81'
RW	12	(Brazil) Hulk
LW	17	(Portugal) Silvestre Varela		(substituted off) 69'
CF	9	(Colombia) Radamel Falcao
Substitutes:
GK	24	(Portugal) Beto
DF	16	(Portugal) Henrique Sereno
DF	22	(Portugal) Miguel Lopes		(substituted on) 74'
MF	3	(Portugal) Raul Meireles		(substituted on) 81'
MF	23	(Brazil) Souza
FW	10	(Uruguay) Cristian Rodríguez		(substituted on) 69'
FW	27	(Portugal) Ukra
Manager:
(Portugal) André Villas-Boas

GK	12	(Spain) Roberto
RB	5	(Portugal) Ruben Amorim
CB	4	(Brazil) Luisão (c)	(yellow card) 47'	(substituted off) 69'
CB	23	(Brazil) David Luiz	(yellow card) 57'
LB	25	(Portugal) César Peixoto
DM	2	(Brazil) Airton
RM	17	(Portugal) Carlos Martins
CM	10	(Argentina) Pablo Aimar	(yellow card) 51'	(substituted off) 59'
LM	18	(Portugal) Fábio Coentrão	(yellow card) 30'	(substituted off) 77'
CF	30	(Argentina) Javier Saviola
CF	7	(Paraguay) Óscar Cardozo
Substitutes:
GK	13	(Brazil) Júlio César
DF	14	(Uruguay) Maxi Pereira
DF	27	(Brazil) Sidnei		(substituted on) 69'
MF	6	(Spain) Javi García
MF	20	(Argentina) Nicolás Gaitán		(substituted on) 77'
FW	11	(Argentina) Franco Jara	(yellow card) 64'	(substituted on) 59'
FW	21	(Portugal) Nuno Gomes
Manager:
(Portugal) Jorge Jesus

2010 Supertaça Cândido de Oliveira Winners
Porto
17th Title

Man of the match

- (Portugal) Rolando (Porto)

Match officials

- Assistant referees:
  - Pais António (Setúbal)
  - Luís Ramos (Setúbal)
- Fourth official: Bruno Esteves (Setúbal)

Match rules

- 90 minutes
- Penalty shoot-out if scores level after 90 minutes
- Seven named substitutes
- Maximum of three substitutions

== See also ==
- O Clássico
- 2010–11 Primeira Liga
- 2010–11 Taça de Portugal
- 2010–11 Taça da Liga
- 2010–11 FC Porto season
- 2010–11 S.L. Benfica season
