= Jorge Fucile =

Uruguayan footballer (born 1984)

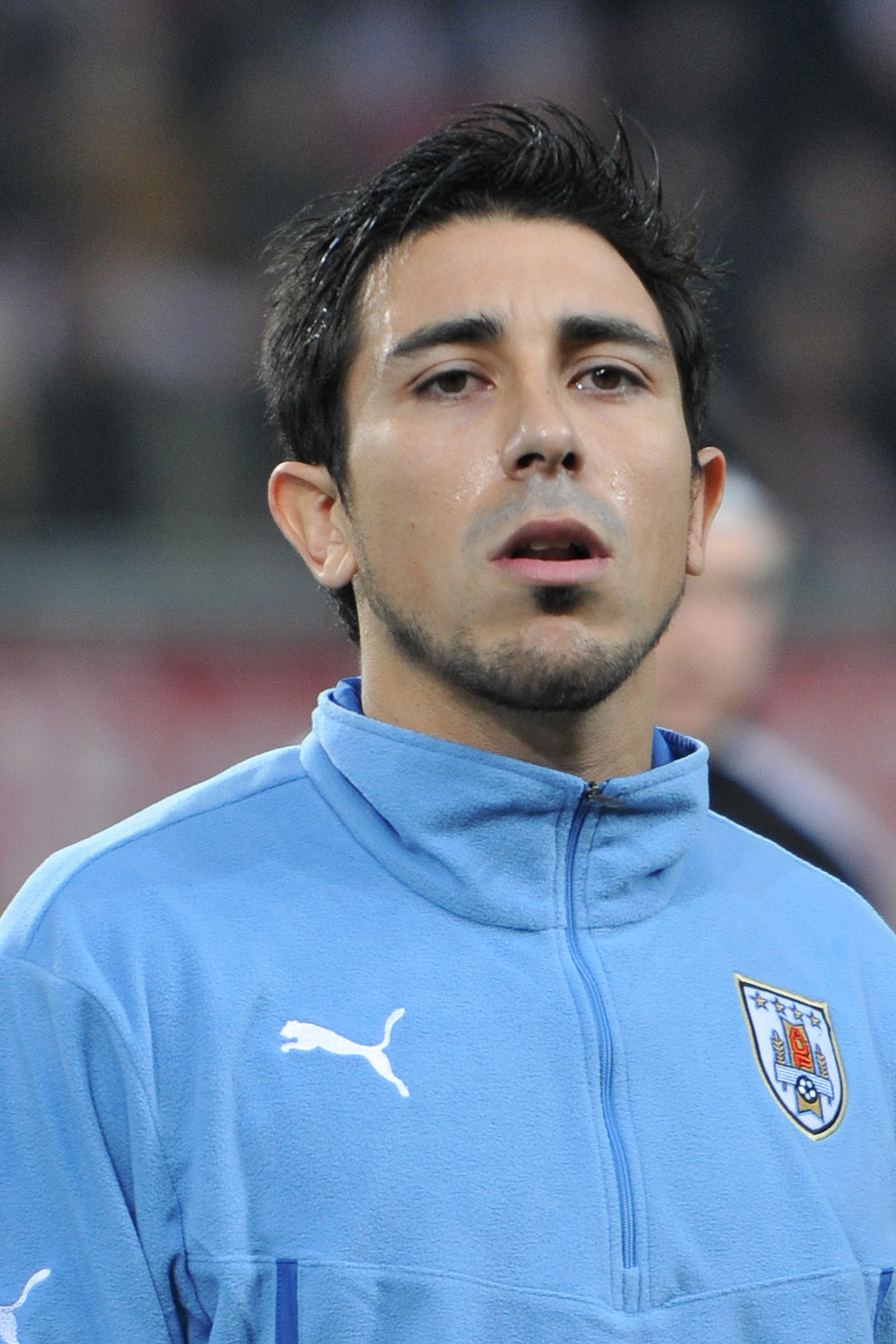
- Fucile lining up for Uruguay in 2014

Personal information
- Full name: Jorge Ciro Fucile Perdomo
- Date of birth: 19 November 1984 (age 41)
- Place of birth: Montevideo, Uruguay
- Height: 1.77 m (5 ft 10 in)
- Position: Full-back

Youth career
- Liverpool Montevideo

Senior career*
Years	Team	Apps	(Gls)
2002–2007	Liverpool Montevideo	30	(2)
2006–2007	→ Porto (loan)	18	(1)
2007–2014	Porto	83	(0)
2012	→ Santos (loan)	0	(0)
2013	Porto B	1	(0)
2014–2018	Nacional	75	(0)
2019	Cartagena	11	(0)
2020–2021	Juventud	6	(0)
Total		224	(3)

International career
2006–2017	Uruguay	49	(0)
- * Club domestic league appearances and goals

Jorge Ciro Fucile Perdomo (pronounced [ˈxoɾxe fuˈtʃile]; born 19 November 1984) is a Uruguayan former professional footballer. A defender, he played as both right or left-back.

After starting out at Liverpool Montevideo he moved to Porto in Portugal, going on to appear in 155 competitive matches over eight seasons and win 11 major titles, including five Primeira Liga championships and the 2011 Europa League.

An Uruguayan international from 2006 to 2017, Fucile represented the country in two World Cups and three Copa América tournaments.

== Club career ==
=== Early years and Porto ===
Born in Montevideo, Fucile began his career with hometown's Liverpool Fútbol Club. On 31 August 2006 he was transferred on loan to FC Porto in Portugal, appearing in 18 games in his first season as the northerners won a second consecutive Primeira Liga; the move was made permanent on 1 July 2007, with the player signing a five-year contract.

Subsequently, Fucile continued to appear regularly for Porto on both sides of the back four. He added a further two leagues to his honours, while contributing a total of 38 matches.

In the 2011–12 season, under new manager Vítor Pereira, Fucile lost his importance in the first team – after Cristian Săpunaru's injury, central defender Maicon was chosen as his successor. In mid-January 2012 he moved on loan to Brazil's Santos FC in a one-year-long deal, being released by his parent club exactly one year later but re-admitted in March 2013.

=== Later career ===
In late December 2013, also not being part of new coach Paulo Fonseca's plans, Fucile intended to return to Uruguay after agreeing a deal with Club Nacional de Football for the 2014 Clausura, but the deal fell through; he eventually signed in July. On 17 February 2014, he was condemned to pay a €45,000 fine for assaulting two stewards at the Estádio da Luz, following a tunnel brawl during the 0–1 away league loss against S.L. Benfica on 20 December 2009.

In July 2019, after a further four Uruguayan Primera División seasons with Nacional and a failed trial at Club Plaza Colonia de Deportes, the 34-year-old Fucile joined FC Cartagena of the Spanish Segunda División B, coached by his compatriot Gustavo Munúa. He returned to his country on 29 October 2020 after 11 months of inactivity, signing a short-term contract at Segunda División club Juventud de Las Piedras.

== International career ==
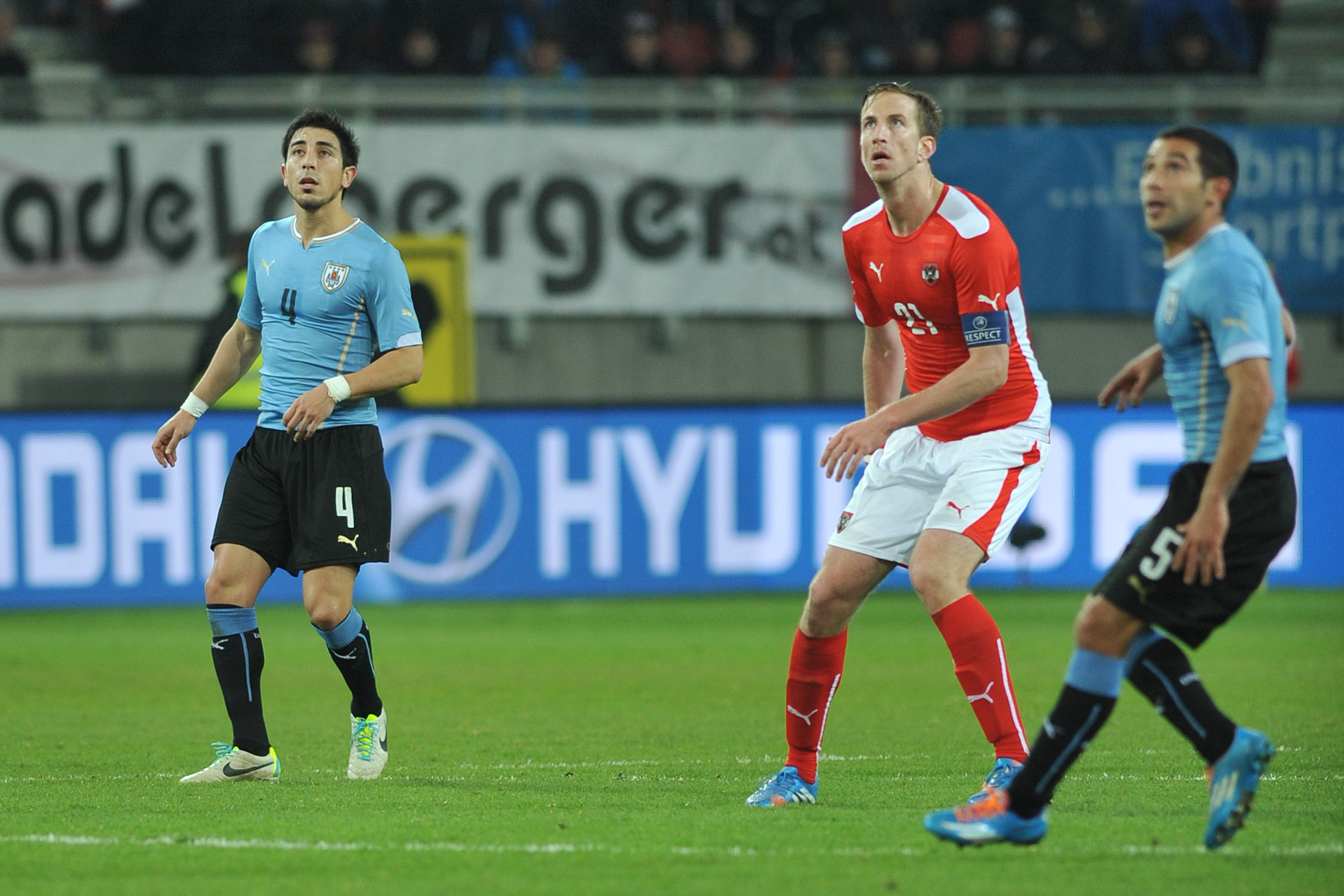
Fucile (left) playing against Austria in March 2014

Fucile made his debut for Uruguay on 24 May 2006, in a 2–0 friendly win over Romania in Los Angeles. Already as first choice, he played four games at the 2007 Copa América as the national team finished fourth.

Fucile was then selected for the 2010 FIFA World Cup in South Africa, making five appearances for the semi-finalists, including the knockout stage victories against South Korea and Ghana (the latter after a penalty shootout). He missed the 2011 Copa América which his country won, but made Óscar Tabárez's squad for the following World Cup in Brazil.

At the 2015 Copa América, Fucile was named in the squad despite playing just 142 minutes of football all year due to thigh injury. In his only appearance of the tournament in place of suspended Álvaro Pereira, he was one of two Uruguay players sent off in the 1–0 quarter-final defeat to hosts Chile. He also went to the next year's edition in the United States, but did not leave the bench.

== Career statistics ==
=== Club ===
Appearances and goals by club, season and competition
Club	Season	League		National cup		League cup		Continental		Other (Note: Includes the Campeonato Paulista, Supertaça Cândido de Oliveira, UEFA Super Cup and Copa Sudamericana)		Total	
Club	Season	Apps	Goals	Apps	Goals	Apps	Goals	Apps	Goals	Apps	Goals	Apps	Goals
Liverpool Montevideo	2003	5	0	—		—		—		—		5	0
Liverpool Montevideo	2004	6	0	—		—		—		—		6	0
Liverpool Montevideo	2005–06	18	2	—		—		—		—		18	2
Liverpool Montevideo	2006–07	1	0	—		—		—		—		1	0
Liverpool Montevideo	Total	30	2	—		—		—		—		30	2
Porto (loan)	2006–07	18	1	1	0	—		6	0	—		25	1
Porto	2007–08	21	0	4	0	1	0	6	0	1	0	33	0
Porto	2008–09	17	0	4	0	0	0	2	0	0	0	23	0
Porto	2009–10	21	0	5	0	2	0	2	0	1	0	31	0
Porto	2010–11	16	0	0	0	3	0	11	0	—		30	0
Porto	2011–12	7	0	0	0	0	0	3	0	2	0	12	0
Porto	2012–13	0	0	0	0	0	0	0	0	—		0	0
Porto	2013–14	1	0	0	0	0	0	0	0	1	0	2	0
Porto	Total	83	0	13	0	6	0	24	0	5	0	131	0
Santos (loan)	2012	0	0	—		—		5	1	9	0	14	1
Porto B	2012–13	0	0	—		—		—		—		0	0
Porto B	2013–14	1	0	—		—		—		—		1	0
Porto B	Total	1	0	—		—		—		—		1	0
Nacional	2014–15	7	0	—		—		—		—		7	0
Nacional	2015–16	21	0	—		—		—		3	0	24	0
Nacional	2016	8	0	—		—		8	0	—		16	0
Nacional	2017	24	0	—		—		7	0	—		31	0
Nacional	2018	15	0	—		—		9	0	6	0	30	0
Nacional	Total	75	0	—		—		24	0	9	0	108	0
Cartagena	2019–20	11	0	—		—		—		—		11	0
Juventud	2020	5	0	—		—		—		—		5	0
Juventud	2021	1	0	—		—		—		—		1	0
Juventud	Total	6	0	—		—		—		—		6	0
Career total		224	3	14	0	6	0	56	1	17	0	317	4

=== International ===
Appearances and goals by national team and year
National team	Year	Apps	Goals
Uruguay	2006	2	0
Uruguay	2007	12	0
Uruguay	2008	4	0
Uruguay	2009	5	0
Uruguay	2010	9	0
Uruguay	2011	2	0
Uruguay	2012	1	0
Uruguay	2013	5	0
Uruguay	2014	3	0
Uruguay	2015	1	0
Uruguay	2016	4	0
Uruguay	2017	1	0
Total		49	0

== Honours ==
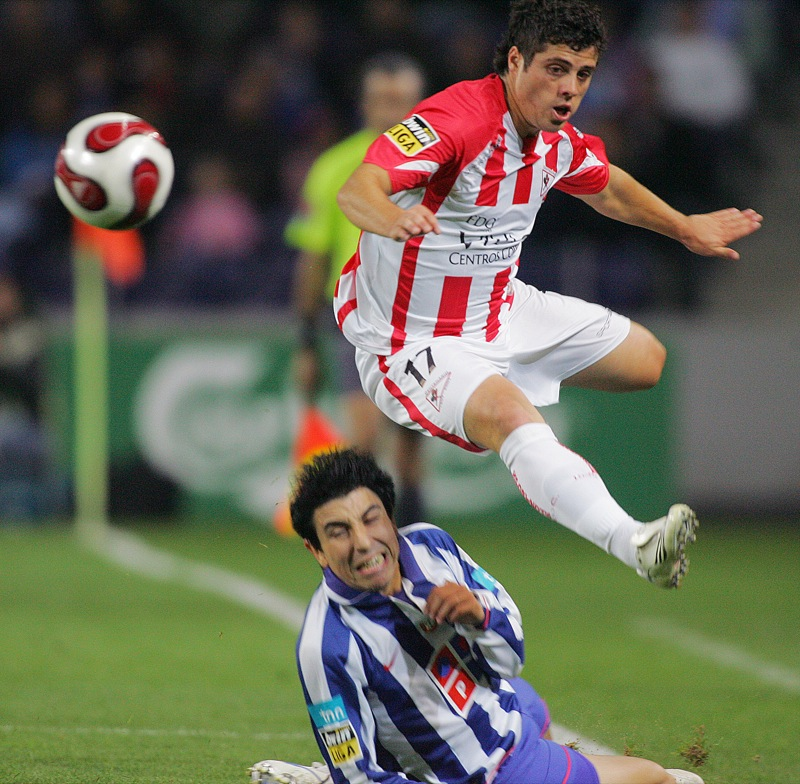
Fucile (bottom) and Vieirinha of Leixões in October 2007

Porto

- Primeira Liga: 2006–07, 2007–08, 2008–09, 2010–11, 2011–12
- Taça de Portugal: 2008–09, 2009–10
- Supertaça Cândido de Oliveira: 2009, 2011, 2013
- UEFA Europa League: 2010–11
- Taça da Liga runner-up: 2009–10
- UEFA Super Cup runner-up: 2011

Santos

- Campeonato Paulista: 2012

Nacional

- Uruguayan Primera División: 2014–15, 2016
