= Rolando (footballer) =

Portuguese footballer (born 1985)

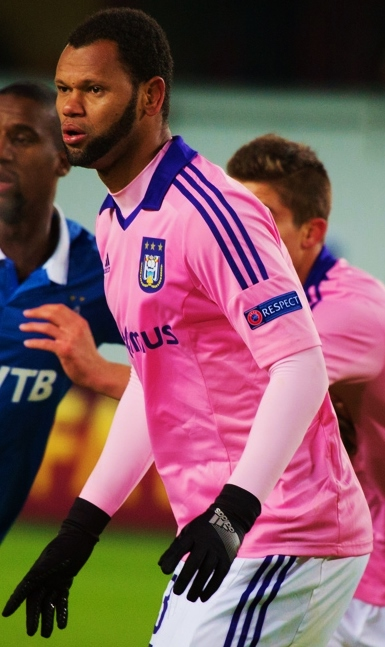
- Rolando playing for Anderlecht

Personal information
- Full name: Rolando Jorge Pires da Fonseca
- Date of birth: 31 August 1985 (age 41)
- Place of birth: São Vicente, Cape Verde
- Height: 1.89 m (6 ft 2 in)
- Position: Centre-back

Youth career
- 1999–2003: Campomaiorense
- 2003–2004: Belenenses

Senior career*
| Years | Team | Apps | (Gls) |
| 2004–2008 | Belenenses | 97 | (7) |
| 2008–2015 | Porto | 112 | (7) |
| 2013 | → Napoli (loan) | 7 | (0) |
| 2013–2014 | → Inter Milan (loan) | 29 | (4) |
| 2015 | → Anderlecht (loan) | 4 | (0) |
| 2015–2019 | Marseille | 90 | (6) |
| 2020–2022 | Braga | 13 | (0) |
| Total | | 352 | (24) |

International career
| 2006–2007 | Portugal U21 | 7 | (0) |
| 2009–2018 | Portugal | 21 | (0) |
Medal record
Men's football
Representing Portugal
UEFA European Championship
| Bronze medal – third place | 2012 Poland-Ukraine |
- * Club domestic league appearances and goals

Rolando Jorge Pires da Fonseca (born 31 August 1985), known simply as Rolando, is a Portuguese former professional footballer who played as a central defender.

He played 222 Primeira Liga games for Belenenses, Porto and Braga, winning several honours including the league, Taça de Portugal and Europa League treble with the second club in 2011. Abroad, he played on loan for Napoli and Inter Milan in Italy and Anderlecht in Belgium, and spent four years in France with Marseille.

Rolando was part of the Portugal squads at the 2010 FIFA World Cup and UEFA Euro 2012, reaching the semi-finals in the latter tournament and earning 21 caps.

== Club career ==
=== Belenenses ===
Rolando was born in São Vicente, Cape Verde. After beginning his career in the youth ranks of lowly S.C. Campomaiorense, he finished his development with Lisbon's C.F. Os Belenenses, which he joined at the age of 18. In his Primeira Liga debut, on 28 August 2004, he played 90 minutes and scored a goal in a 3–0 home win against C.S. Marítimo.

Rolando went on to become an essential defensive figure onwards, appearing in all 30 games in the 2007–08 season as the team finished in eighth place.

=== Porto ===
On 15 April 2008, FC Porto confirmed that Rolando had agreed to part ways with Belenenses and join them on a four-year contract. In his first season he quickly beat competition from veteran Pedro Emanuel, partnering Bruno Alves in the centre and netting three times in 28 matches as the northerners won the league and the domestic cup. In the summer of 2009, the club acquired an additional 10% of his economic rights and the player also extended his link until 30 June 2014.

In 2010–11, Rolando rarely missed a game for Porto who won another national championship. On 17 February 2011 he opened the score at Sevilla FC through a header, in an eventual 2–1 win in the round of 32 of the UEFA Europa League, which ended in conquest.

Rolando started 2011–12 in scoring fashion, netting both goals in the Portuguese Supercup, a 2–1 victory over Vitória S.C. in Aveiro. On 30 January 2013, completely ostracised by manager Vítor Pereira as practically all Portuguese players, he was transferred to SSC Napoli of the Serie A, being loaned until June.

On 10 August 2013, Inter Milan confirmed the signing of Rolando in a season-long loan, for €600,000. He scored his first goal for the side on 27 October, contributing to a 4–2 home defeat of Hellas Verona FC.

In February 2015, after spending the first half of the new campaign ousted from the squad due to a run-in with the board of directors after he refused to join the team's pre-season, Rolando was loaned to R.S.C. Anderlecht until June.

=== Marseille ===
On 1 September 2015, Rolando was signed by Olympique de Marseille. His playtime was initially cut short, as the replacement to head coach Marcelo Bielsa, Míchel, saw little use in him, and was eventually transfer listed by Franck Passi after his first season in France.

However, Rolando returned to the squad under the newly appointed Rudi Garcia, becoming an integral part of the team's defense and notably contributing to a 0–0 away draw to title holders Paris Saint-Germain FC. On 3 May 2018, brought from the bench for Morgan Sanson in extra time, he scored in the dying minutes of the Europa League semi-finals against FC Red Bull Salzburg for a 2–1 away loss and 3–2 aggregate win.

=== Braga ===
Rolando returned to his country of adoption on 27 February 2020, with the 34-year-old free agent joining S.C. Braga – coached by his former Belenenses teammate Ruben Amorim – on a two-and-a-half-year contract. He finished 2020–21 as a cup winner, scoring the opening goal of a 5–0 home win over S.C.U. Torreense in the last 16.

Braga sought to offload Rolando before the 2021–22 season, but he turned down all available offers due to his high wage demands. He was completely frozen out by manager Carlos Carvalhal for the last year of his contract, despite long-term injuries to David Carmo and Nuno Sequeira in the backline.

Rolando left the Estádio Municipal de Braga in July 2022, with only 16 competitive appearances to his credit.

== International career ==
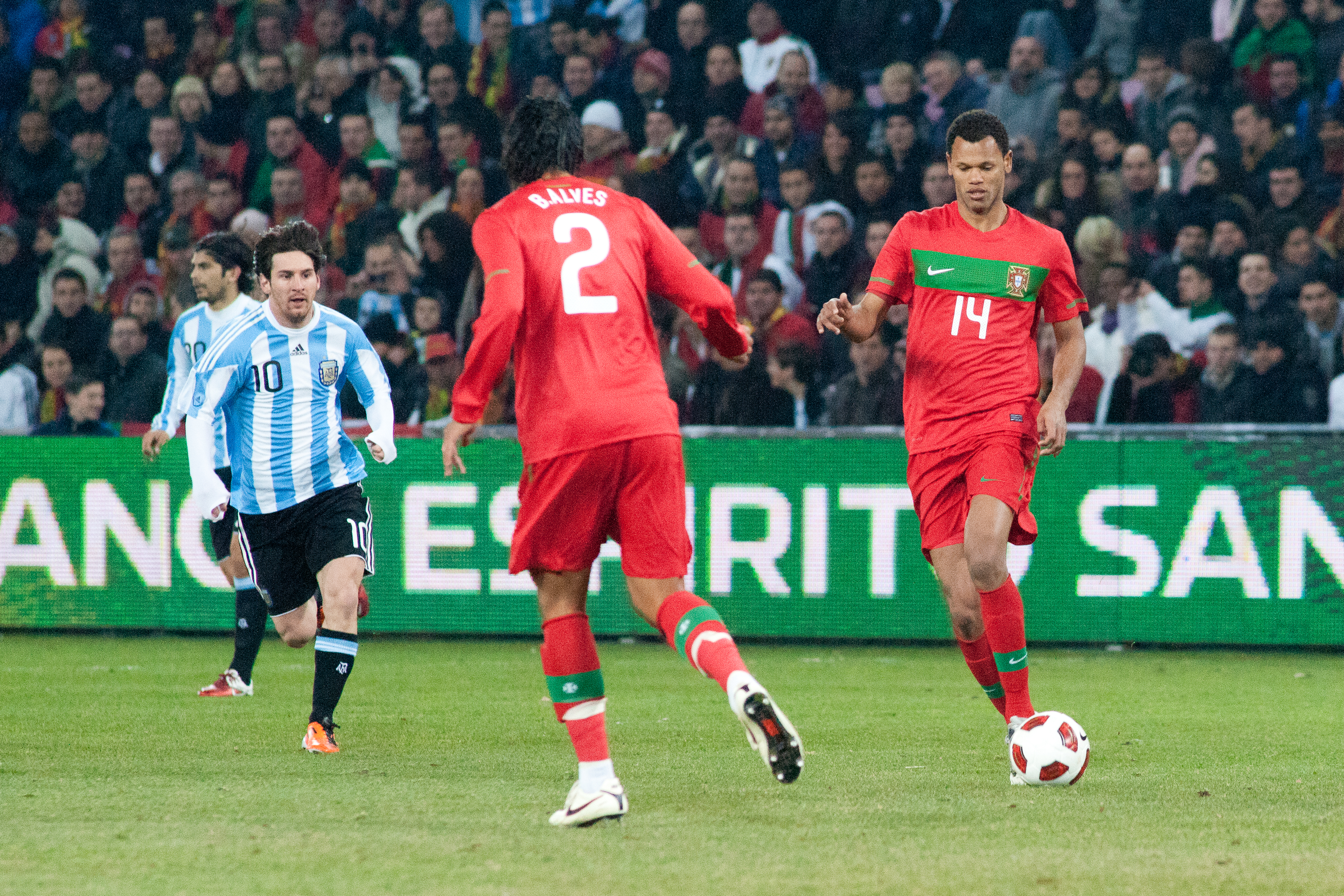
Rolando (right) playing against Argentina in February 2011.

Although born in Cape Verde, Rolando moved to Portugal aged 14 and became a naturalised citizen in 2006. He immediately started playing for the nation's under-21s, for whom he appeared at the 2006 and 2007 UEFA European Championships.

On 11 February 2009, Rolando was first called up to the full side, playing 90 minutes in a friendly match with Finland in Faro (1–0 win). He was selected for the 2010 FIFA World Cup in South Africa, but did not leave the bench.

At UEFA Euro 2012, Rolando made three appearances for the semi-finalists, all as a late substitute. After a four-year international absence, he returned to the international fold for a friendly against Egypt in March 2018. He was named in a preliminary 35-man squad for the year's World Cup weeks later, but did not make the final cut.

== Career statistics ==
=== Club ===
As of 26 May 2019

Appearances and goals by club, season and competition
| Club | Season | League | | | National cup | | Continental | | Other | | Total | |
| Club | Season | Division | Apps | Goals | Apps | Goals | Apps | Goals | Apps | Goals | Apps | Goals |
|---|---|---|---|---|---|---|---|---|---|---|---|---|
| Belenenses | 2004–05 | Primeira Liga | 16 | 2 | 0 | 0 | — | | — | | 16 | 2 |
| Belenenses | 2005–06 | Primeira Liga | 25 | 3 | 0 | 0 | — | | — | | 25 | 3 |
| Belenenses | 2006–07 | Primeira Liga | 26 | 0 | 0 | 0 | — | | — | | 26 | 0 |
| Belenenses | 2007–08 | Primeira Liga | 30 | 2 | 0 | 0 | 2 | 0 | — | | 32 | 2 |
| Belenenses | Total | | 97 | 7 | 0 | 0 | 2 | 0 | 0 | 0 | 99 | 7 |
| Porto | 2008–09 | Primeira Liga | 28 | 3 | 4 | 0 | 10 | 1 | 0 | 0 | 42 | 4 |
| Porto | 2009–10 | Primeira Liga | 28 | 3 | 7 | 2 | 7 | 1 | 1 | 0 | 43 | 6 |
| Porto | 2010–11 | Primeira Liga | 29 | 0 | 6 | 1 | 15 | 2 | 1 | 0 | 51 | 3 |
| Porto | 2011–12 | Primeira Liga | 26 | 1 | 2 | 0 | 8 | 0 | 1 | 2 | 37 | 3 |
| Porto | 2012–13 | Primeira Liga | 1 | 0 | 0 | 0 | 0 | 0 | 0 | 0 | 1 | 0 |
| Porto | Total | | 112 | 7 | 19 | 3 | 40 | 4 | 3 | 2 | 174 | 16 |
| Napoli (loan) | 2012–13 | Serie A | 7 | 0 | 0 | 0 | 2 | 0 | — | | 9 | 0 |
| Inter Milan (loan) | 2013–14 | Serie A | 29 | 4 | 0 | 0 | — | | — | | 29 | 4 |
| Anderlecht (loan) | 2014–15 | Belgian Pro League | 4 | 0 | 2 | 0 | 2 | 0 | 2 | 0 | 10 | 0 |
| Marseille | 2015–16 | Ligue 1 | 19 | 1 | 5 | 0 | 5 | 0 | — | | 29 | 1 |
| Marseille | 2016–17 | Ligue 1 | 30 | 4 | 5 | 0 | — | | — | | 35 | 4 |
| Marseille | 2017–18 | Ligue 1 | 31 | 1 | 3 | 0 | 12 | 1 | — | | 46 | 2 |
| Marseille | 2018–19 | Ligue 1 | 10 | 0 | 2 | 0 | 1 | 0 | — | | 13 | 0 |
| Marseille | Total | | 90 | 6 | 15 | 0 | 18 | 1 | 0 | 0 | 123 | 7 |
| Career total | | | 339 | 24 | 36 | 3 | 64 | 5 | 5 | 2 | 444 | 34 |

=== International ===
Appearances and goals by national team and year
| National team | Year | Apps | Goals |
|---|---|---|---|
| Portugal | 2009 | 6 | 0 |
| Portugal | 2010 | 2 | 0 |
| Portugal | 2011 | 4 | 0 |
| Portugal | 2012 | 6 | 0 |
| Portugal | 2014 | 1 | 0 |
| Portugal | 2018 | 2 | 0 |
| Total | | 21 | 0 |

== Honours ==
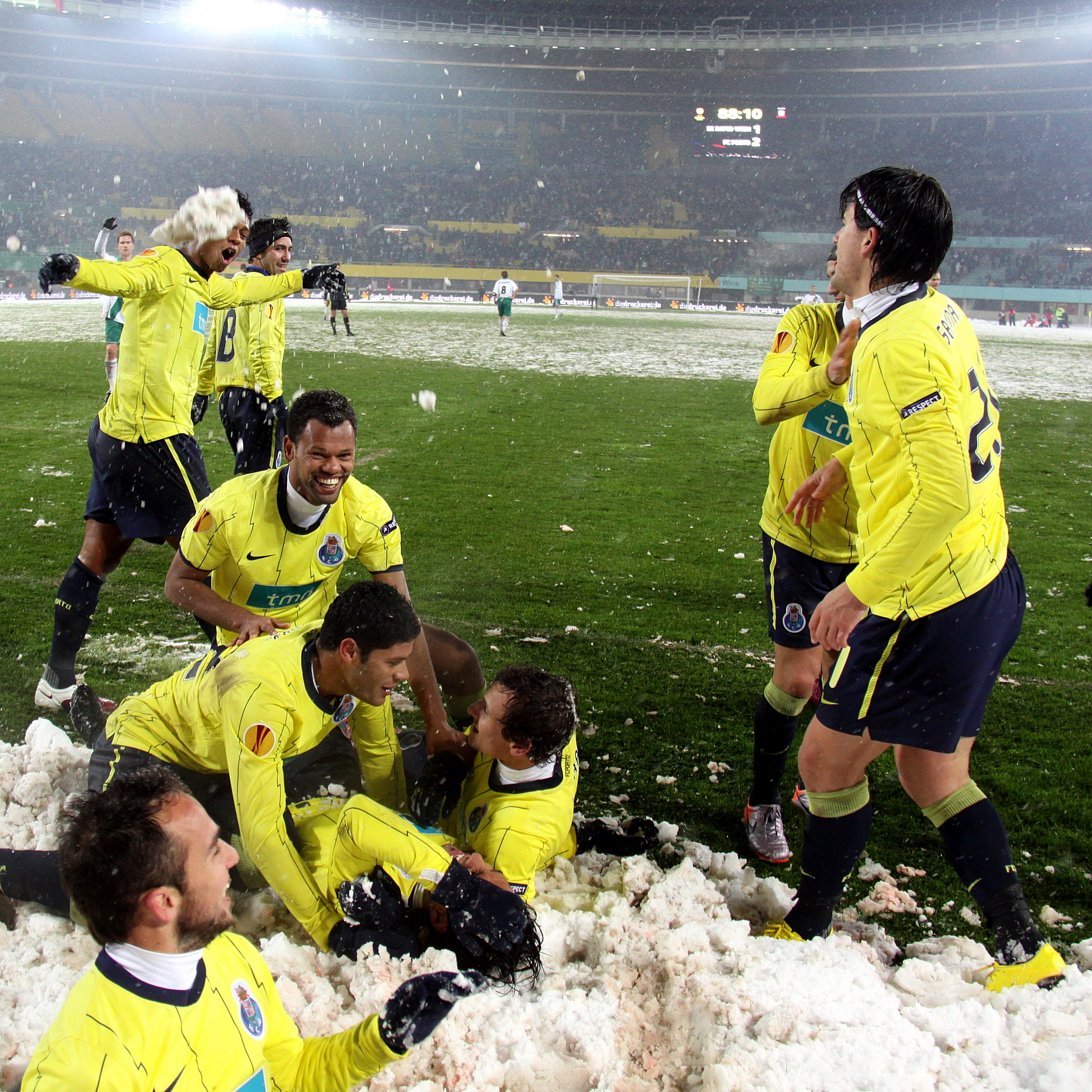
Rolando (left, kneeling behind Hulk) during Porto's run to the Europa League title in 2010–11

Porto

- Primeira Liga: 2008–09, 2010–11, 2011–12, 2012–13
- Taça de Portugal: 2008–09, 2009–10, 2010–11
- Supertaça Cândido de Oliveira: 2009, 2010, 2011, 2012
- UEFA Europa League: 2010–11
- UEFA Super Cup runner-up: 2011
- Taça da Liga runner-up: 2009–10

Anderlecht

- Belgian Cup runner-up: 2014–15

Marseille

- Coupe de France runner-up: 2015–16
- UEFA Europa League runner-up: 2017–18

Braga

- Taça de Portugal: 2020–21
