= Fernando Belluschi =

Argentine midfielder

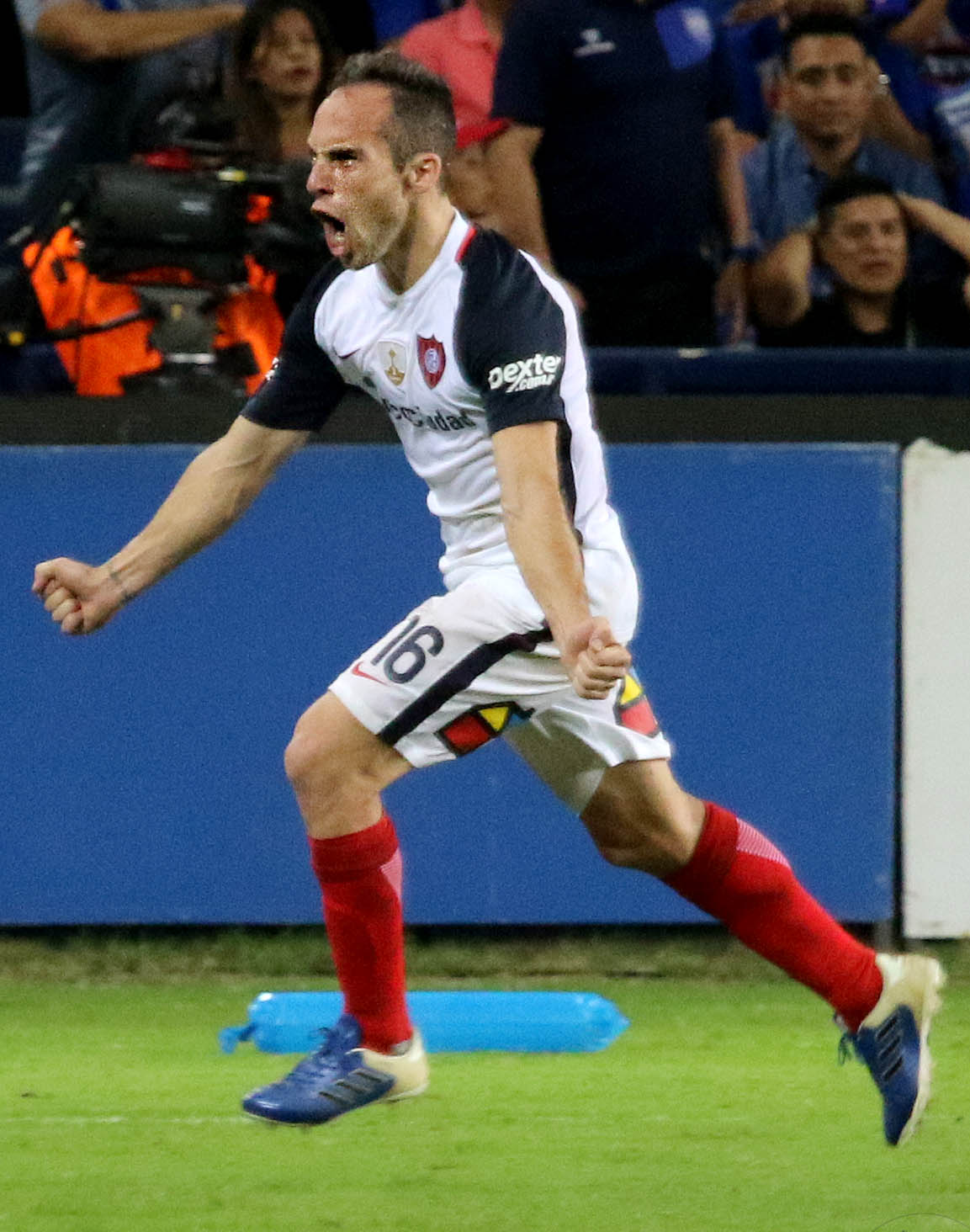
- Belluschi with San Lorenzo in 2017

Personal information
- Full name: Fernando Daniel Belluschi
- Date of birth: 10 September 1983 (age 43)
- Place of birth: Los Quirquinchos, Argentina
- Height: 1.75 m (5 ft 9 in)
- Position: Midfielder

Youth career
- Newell's Old Boys

Senior career*
Years	Team	Apps	(Gls)
2002–2005	Newell's Old Boys	90	(20)
2005–2007	River Plate	48	(13)
2007–2009	Olympiacos	36	(6)
2009–2012	Porto	69	(6)
2012	→ Genoa (loan)	14	(1)
2012–2015	Bursaspor	89	(11)
2015	Cruz Azul	8	(0)
2016–2020	San Lorenzo	77	(11)
2020–2021	Lanús	10	(0)
2021–2022	Newell's Old Boys	10	(0)
2022–2024	Estudiantes RC	47	(3)

International career
2005–2017	Argentina	6	(0)
- * Club domestic league appearances and goals as of 14:32, 7 October 2023 (UTC)

Fernando Daniel Belluschi (Spanish pronunciation: [beˈlustʃi], Italian: [belˈluski]; born 10 September 1983) is an Argentine former professional player. During his playing career, Belluschi was a midfielder. Belluschi played for clubs as River Plate or San Lorenzo in Argentina, Olympiacos in Greece or Porto in Portugal.

== Club career ==
Belluschi began playing professionally at Newell's Old Boys in 2002, with whom he won the 2004 Apertura Championship. He moved to River Plate in 2006 and with the departure of Marcelo Gallardo to Paris Saint-Germain following the 2006 Apertura, he was named team captain, a position he would fill for two years. He then joined Olympiacos for reported €6.5 million in early 2008.

On 6 July 2009, Porto purchased Belluschi's playing rights and 50% of his economic rights for €5 million. The other 50% was owned by private investment company Rio Football Services Ltd. He signed a contract until 2013 with a release clause of €30 million.

In 2012, Belluschi was sent on to Genoa under a purchasing option of €3.5 million, or €5 million if the club qualified for the UEFA Europa League. In summer 2012, Porto sold its 50% ownership of his economic rights for €1.05 million.

On 10 July 2015, Cruz Azul signed Belluschi on a free transfer. His salary was set at €1.1 million. He debuted for the side as a substitute in the 61st minute for an injured Marc Crosas in the Clasico Joven. He did not receive his international pass until the Clasico Joven, which was why he did not participate in any league matches up to that point. He failed to score for Cruz Azul, having a penalty saved by Atlas goalkeeper Miguel Ángel Fraga on matchday 11.

On 26 January 2016, San Lorenzo signed the then-32-year-old Belluschi on a free transfer.

== Career statistics ==
As of match played 25 November 2023

Appearances and goals by club, season and competition
Club	Season	League			National cup		League cup		Continental		Other		Total	
Club	Season	Division	Apps	Goals	Apps	Goals	Apps	Goals	Apps	Goals	Apps	Goals	Apps	Goals
Newell's Old Boys	2002–03	Argentine Primera División	10	0	—		—		—		—		10	0
Newell's Old Boys	2003–04	Argentine Primera División	12	1	—		—		—		—		12	1
Newell's Old Boys	2004–05	Argentine Primera División	33	8	—		—		2 (Note: Appearances in Copa Sudamericana)	0	—		35	8
Newell's Old Boys	2005–06	Argentine Primera División	35	11	—		—		9 (Note: Seven appearances in Copa Libertadores, two appearances in Copa Sudamericana)	0	—		44	11
Newell's Old Boys	Total		90	20	—		—		11	0	—		101	20
River Plate	2006–07	Argentine Primera División	36	6	—		—		12 (Note: Six appearances in Copa Libertadores, six appearances in Copa Sudamericana)	0	—		48	6
River Plate	2007–08	Argentine Primera División	12	7	—		—		0	0	—		12	7
River Plate	Total		48	13	—		—		12	0	—		60	13
Olympiacos Piraeus	2007–08	Super League Greece	11	1	3	0	—		2 (Note: Appearances in UEFA Champions League)	0	—		16	1
Olympiacos Piraeus	2008–09	Super League Greece	25	5	6	1	—		8 (Note: One appearance and one goal in UEFA Champions League, seven appearances and one goal in UEFA Cup)	2	—		39	8
Olympiacos Piraeus	Total		36	6	9	1	—		10	2	—		55	9
Porto	2009–10	Primeira Liga	27	3	5	1	3	1	4	0	1 (Note: Appearance in Supertaça Cândido de Oliveira)	0	40	5
Porto	2010–11	Primeira Liga	26	2	4	0	2	0	13 (Note: Appearance(s) in UEFA Europa League)	1	1	0	46	3
Porto	2011–12	Primeira Liga	16	1	2	0	2	0	5	0	2 (Note: One appearance in Supertaça Cândido de Oliveira, one appearance in UEFA Super Cup)	0	27	1
Porto	Total		69	6	11	1	7	1	22	1	4	0	113	9
Genoa (loan)	2011–12	Serie A	14	1	0	0	—		—		—		14	1
Bursaspor	2012–13	Süper Lig	30	5	3	1	—		0	0	—		33	6
Bursaspor	2013–14	Süper Lig	27	3	9	1	—		1	0	—		37	4
Bursaspor	2014–15	Süper Lig	32	3	9	1	—		1	0	—		42	4
Bursaspor	Total		89	11	21	3	—		2	0	—		112	14
Cruz Azul	2015–16	Liga MX	8	0	0	0	—		—		—		8	0
San Lorenzo	2016	Argentine Primera División	14	2	4	1	—		11 (Note: Five appearances in Copa Libertadores, six appearances and one goal in Copa Sudamericana)	1	1 (Note: Appearance in Supercopa Argentina)	1	30	5
San Lorenzo	2016–17	Argentine Primera División	26	6	2	0	—		10 (Note: Appearances in Copa Libertadores)	2	—		38	8
San Lorenzo	2017–18	Argentine Primera División	15	2	2	0	—		0	0	—		17	2
San Lorenzo	2018–19	Argentine Primera División	13	0	0	0	0	0	3	0	—		16	0
San Lorenzo	2019–20	Argentine Primera División	9	1	0	0	0	0	—		—		9	1
San Lorenzo	Total		77	11	8	1	0	0	24	3	1	1	110	16
Lanús	2019–20	Argentine Primera División	4	0	0	0	1	0	6	0	—		11	0
Lanús	2020–21	Argentine Primera División	6	0	0	0	0	0	0	0	—		6	0
Lanús	Total		10	0	0	0	1	0	6	0	—		17	0
Newell's Old Boys	2021	Argentine Primera División	10	0	0	0	0	0	2	0	—		12	0
Estudiantes RC	2022	Primera Nacional	22	2	—		—		—		—		22	2
Estudiantes RC	2023	Primera Nacional	24	1	1	0	—		—		—		25	1
Estudiantes RC	Total		46	3	1	0	—		—		—		47	3
Career totals			497	71	50	6	8	1	89	6	5	1	649	85

== International career ==
Belluschi has won six caps for Argentina, all in friendlies. In November 2017, after six years away from the national team, Belluschi was named in coach Jorge Sampaoli's squad for friendlies against Russia and Nigeria in the former.

== Personal life ==
Belluschi is married to Florencia, whom he met in his home city of Los Quirquinchos. They began dating when he was 17 years old and have been together since. He is best friends with fellow professional footballer Ignacio Scocco, and both served as best men at each other's wedding.

Belluschi also holds an Italian passport due to his Italian ancestry from the province of Pavia, where his paternal great-grandfather emigrated to Argentina from.

== Honours ==
Newell's Old Boys

- Argentine Primera División: Torneo Apertura 2004

Olympiacos

- Super League Greece: 2007–08, 2008–09
- Greek Cup: 2007–08, 2008–09

Porto

- Primeira Liga: 2010–11, 2011–12
- Taça de Portugal: 2009–10, 2010–11
- Supertaça Cândido de Oliveira: 2009, 2010, 2011
- UEFA Europa League: 2010–11

San Lorenzo

- Supercopa Argentina: 2015

Argentina

- South American Youth Championship: 2003

Individual

- Footballer of the Year of Argentina: 2016
