= 2011 Supertaça Cândido de Oliveira =

- Event: Supertaça Cândido de Oliveira (Portuguese Super Cup)
Porto	Vitória de Guimarães
2	1
- Date: 7 August 2011
- Venue: Estádio Municipal de Aveiro, Aveiro
- Referee: Pedro Proença
- Attendance: 18,313

The 2011 Supertaça Cândido de Oliveira was the 33rd edition of the Supertaça Cândido de Oliveira, the annual Portuguese football season-opening match contested by the winners of the previous season's top league and cup competitions (or cup runner-up in case the league- and cup-winning club is the same). The 2011 edition opposed Porto, the 2010–11 Primeira Liga and 2010–11 Taça de Portugal title holders, and Vitória de Guimarães, the 2010–11 Taça de Portugal runners-up.

Porto defeated Vitória de Guimarães 2–1, with two goals from Portuguese centre back Rolando, and collected their third consecutive Super Cup, raising the club's tally to 18 trophies in this competition (54.5% of wins).

== Match details ==
7 August 2011
21:00 UTC+1

Porto	2–1	Vitória de Guimarães
Rolando 4', 41'	Report	Toscano 33'

Estádio Municipal de Aveiro, Aveiro
Attendance: 18,313
Referee: Pedro Proença

Porto	Vitória de Guimarães

PORTO:
GK	1	(Brazil) Helton (c)
RB	21	(Romania) Cristian Săpunaru
CB	4	(Brazil) Maicon
CB	14	(Portugal) Rolando
LB	13	(Uruguay) Jorge Fucile	(yellow card) 58'
DM	23	(Brazil) Souza
CM	28	(Portugal) Rúben Micael		(substituted off) 66'
CM	8	(Portugal) João Moutinho		(substituted off) 85'
RW	17	(Portugal) Silvestre Varela		(substituted off) 66'
CF	11	(Brazil) Kléber
FW	12	(Brazil) Hulk
Substitutes:
GK	31	(Brazil) Rafael Bracalli
DF	16	(Portugal) Henrique Sereno
DF	30	(Argentina) Nicolás Otamendi
MF	6	(Colombia) Fredy Guarín		(substituted on) 66'
MF	7	(Argentina) Fernando Belluschi		(substituted on) 85'
FW	9	(Colombia) Radamel Falcao		(substituted on) 66'
FW	20	(Angola) Djalma
Manager:
(Portugal) Vítor Pereira

VITÓRIA DE GUIMARÃES:
GK	1	(Brazil) Nilson
RB	79	(Portugal) Alex (c)
CB	40	(Portugal) João Paulo	(yellow card) 64'
CB	44	(Mali) Mahamadou Ndiaye	(yellow card) 73'
LB	33	(Brazil) Anderson Santana
DM	5	(Morocco) Issam El Adoua
CM	18	(Brazil) Leonel Olímpio		(substituted off) 72'
CM	14	(Uruguay) Jean Barrientos		(substituted off) 76'
RW	7	(Portugal) Tiago Targino	(yellow card) 70'
LW	20	(Morocco) Faouzi Abdelghni		(substituted off) 57'
CF	8	(Brazil) Marcelo Toscano
Substitutes:
GK	83	(Brazil) Douglas
DF	3	(Brazil) Rodrigo Defendi
DF	55	(France) Tony
MF	80	(Portugal) João Alves		(substituted on) 72'
MF	4	(Portugal) Pedro Mendes		(substituted on) 76'
MF	26	(Brazil) Dinis
FW	77	(Brazil) Maranhão		(substituted on) 57'
Manager:
(Portugal) Manuel Machado

2011 Supertaça Cândido de Oliveira Winners
Porto
18th Title

Man of the match

- (Portugal) Rolando (Porto)

Match officials

- Assistant referees:
  - Tiago Trigo (Lisbon)
  - André Campos (Lisbon)
- Fourth official: Hugo Miguel (Lisbon)

Match rules

- 90 minutes
- Penalty shoot-out if scores level after 90 minutes
- Seven named substitutes
- Maximum of three substitutions

== See also ==
- 2011–12 Primeira Liga
- 2011–12 Taça de Portugal
- 2011–12 Taça da Liga
- 2011–12 FC Porto season
