= Silvestre Varela =

Portuguese footballer (born 1985)

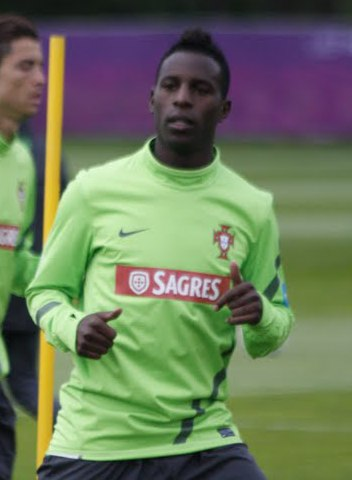
- Varela training with Portugal in 2012

Personal information
- Full name: Silvestre Manuel Gonçalves Varela
- Date of birth: 2 February 1985 (age 41)
- Place of birth: Almada, Portugal
- Height: 1.80 m (5 ft 11 in)
- Position: Winger

Youth career
- 1993–2001: Pescadores
- 2001–2004: Sporting CP

Senior career*
Years	Team	Apps	(Gls)
2004	Sporting CP B	1	(0)
2004–2008	Sporting CP	2	(0)
2004–2005	→ Casa Pia (loan)	36	(12)
2006–2007	→ Vitória Setúbal (loan)	45	(5)
2007–2008	→ Recreativo (loan)	22	(0)
2008–2009	Estrela Amadora	28	(6)
2009–2017	Porto	141	(33)
2014–2015	→ West Bromwich Albion (loan)	7	(1)
2015	→ Parma (loan)	19	(3)
2017–2019	Kayserispor	55	(3)
2019–2021	B-SAD	52	(3)
2021–2023	Porto B	41	(4)
Total		449	(70)

International career
2003	Portugal U18	5	(1)
2003–2004	Portugal U19	14	(4)
2005	Portugal U20	4	(1)
2005–2007	Portugal U21	28	(6)
2005–2006	Portugal B	5	(0)
2010–2015	Portugal	27	(5)
Medal record
Men's football
Representing Portugal
UEFA European Championship
Bronze medal – third place	2012 Poland-Ukraine
- * Club domestic league appearances and goals

Silvestre Manuel Gonçalves Varela (born 2 February 1985) is a Portuguese former professional footballer who played as a winger.

He represented mainly Porto during his career, amassing Primeira Liga totals of 268 matches and 47 goals over 12 seasons and winning 11 major titles, including three national championships and the 2011 Europa League. He also competed professionally in Spain, England, Italy and Turkey.

Varela appeared for Portugal at Euro 2012 and the 2014 World Cup, scoring in both tournaments.

== Club career ==
=== Sporting CP ===
Born in Almada, Setúbal District and of Cape Verdean descent, Varela was product of Sporting CP's youth system, being loaned to Casa Pia A.C. and Vitória F.C. in his early years as a professional. Despite being a regular with the Portugal under-21s and having enjoyed a decent form in various tournaments, he was not able to secure a place in the Lions' first team, only managing two substitute appearances in the 2005–06 season.

In 2007–08, Varela, alongside former Sporting players Beto and Carlos Martins, joined Recreativo de Huelva in Spain (Varela on loan again). After a disappointing campaign despite having received playing time in La Liga, he returned to Sporting in July 2008 only to be immediately sold to C.F. Estrela da Amadora.

=== Porto ===
Before the season was over, in March 2009, courtesy of his solid performances at Estrela, only relegated from the Primeira Liga off the field, Varela signed a five-year agreement with champions FC Porto on a free transfer, starting in July. He made his debut on 9 August by starting in the Supertaça Cândido de Oliveira, a 2–0 win against F.C. Paços de Ferreira. In his first year he ranked second in overall goals in the squad, only behind Radamel Falcao; in March 2010, however, he broke his fibula in training, being lost for the remainder of the campaign as the team finished third. He missed the conclusion of their conquest of the Taça de Portugal, though he scored in the 5–2 home victory over Sporting in the quarter-finals.

Varela scored a career-best 13 goals in 44 games in 2010–11 as Porto won the supercup, league, cup and UEFA Europa League. In the final of the third, he scored in a 6–2 defeat of Vitória de Guimarães.

In the 2011–12 season, under new manager Vítor Pereira, Varela – as practically all Portuguese players (the roster was composed of three nationals) – lost his importance. On 16 February 2012, in a rare start, he put his team ahead against Manchester City in the round of 32 of the Europa League, in an eventual 1–2 home loss. In September, he extended his contract to 2016.

Varela moved to Premier League side West Bromwich Albion on 24 August 2014, in a season-long loan deal. Having arrived whilst still recovering from injury, he made his official debut on 2 December, replacing Craig Gardner midway through the second half of a 1–2 home defeat to West Ham United. He scored his first goal for the Baggies on the 20th, but in a 3–2 loss at Queens Park Rangers.

On 20 January 2015, still owned by Porto, Varela joined Parma F.C. until June. He scored his first goal on 8 April – after the club had been declared bankrupt – as the only one of a home win against Udinese Calcio. In the final two Serie A games of the campaign, his goals earned 2–2 draws against Hellas Verona FC and UC Sampdoria, though the team from the Stadio Ennio Tardini finished dead last. Following his loan, he extended his Porto contract for three more years.

=== Kayserispor ===
Having made only seven appearances for Porto during the season, Varela, who was by then the club's longest serving player, ended his seven-and-a-half-year link on 20 January 2017 by signing for Turkey's Kayserispor. He and fellow veteran Asamoah Gyan were told at the end of their contracts in June 2018 that they would only be retained if they signed performance-based deals, due to their injury record.

=== B-SAD ===
On 8 October 2019, having been a free agent, Varela returned to his country's top-flight by joining B-SAD until the end of the campaign. The following July, he signed for another season and was made captain.

=== Return to Porto ===
Varela returned to Porto on 20 July 2021; the 36-year-old was brought to pass on experience and knowledge to the young players in the reserves, who competed in the Liga Portugal 2. He scored in his very first match in the competition, a 2–2 home draw against newly promoted C.D. Trofense.

In June 2022, Varela agreed to a one-year extension. He then retired.

== International career ==
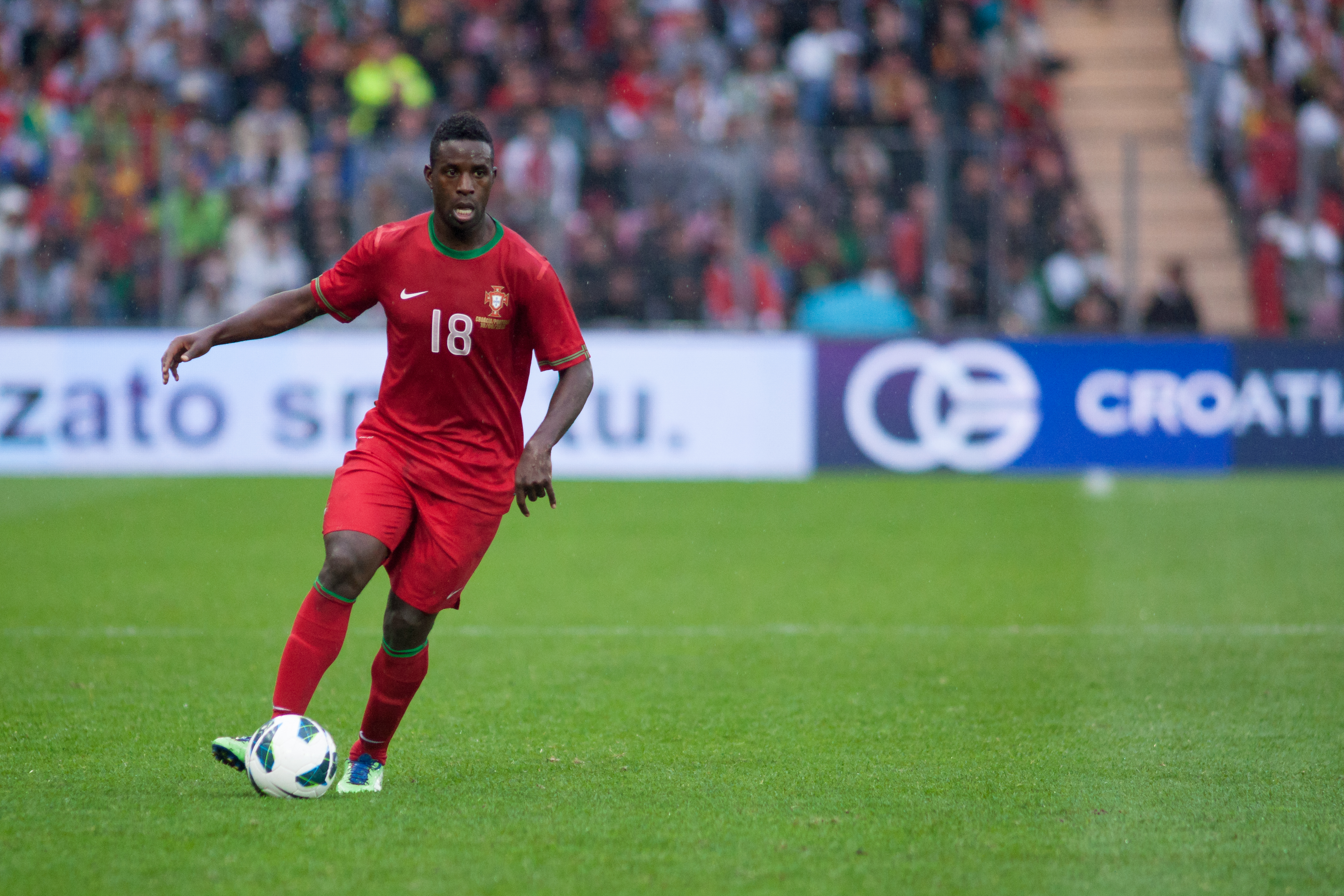
Varela in action against Croatia in 2013

Due to his Porto performances, Varela earned his first full cap for the Portugal national team on 3 March 2010, appearing in the second half of the 2–0 friendly win over China in a match played in Coimbra. His first goal came on 26 March 2011 in a 1–1 friendly draw with Chile, in Leiria.

Varela was selected by manager Paulo Bento for the 23-man squad that competed in UEFA Euro 2012. He played ten minutes in the group stage opener against Germany, in an eventual 1–0 loss. Again coming from the bench for Raul Meireles, he scored an 88th-minute 3–2 winner over Denmark in the following game.

On 19 May 2014, Varela was picked for the 2014 FIFA World Cup. On 23 June, again after having replaced Meireles, he headed home in the 94th minute to earn his team a 2–2 draw against the United States in the group phase.

== Personal life ==
Varela's nephew Nilton is also a footballer, playing in defence. The pair were teammates at B-SAD and Porto B.

== Career statistics ==
=== Club ===
As of match played on 13 May 2022

Appearances and goals by club, season and competition
Club	Season	League			National cup (Note: Includes Taça de Portugal, Copa del Rey, FA Cup, Coppa Italia and Turkish Cup)		League cup (Note: Includes Taça da Liga and Football League Cup)		Continental		Other		Total	
Club	Season	Division	Apps	Goals	Apps	Goals	Apps	Goals	Apps	Goals	Apps	Goals	Apps	Goals
Sporting CP	2005–06	Primeira Liga	2	0	0	0	—		2 (Note: Appearances in UEFA Cup)	0	—		4	0
Casa Pia (loan)	2004–05	Segunda Divisão	36	12	1	0	—		—		—		37	12
Vitória Setúbal (loan)	2005–06	Primeira Liga	15	2	4	1	—		—		—		19	3
Vitória Setúbal (loan)	2006–07	Primeira Liga	30	3	1	0	—		2	0	1 (Note: Appearance in Supertaça Cândido de Oliveira)	0	34	3
Vitória Setúbal (loan)	Total		45	5	5	1	—		2	0	1	0	53	6
Recreativo (loan)	2007–08	La Liga	22	0	2	0	—		—		—		24	0
Estrela Amadora	2008–09	Primeira Liga	28	5	6	1	1	2	—		—		35	8
Porto	2009–10	Primeira Liga	18	8	3	1	2	1	5 (Note: Appearances in UEFA Champions League)	1	1	0	29	11
Porto	2010–11	Primeira Liga	26	10	5	2	0	0	12 (Note: Appearances in UEFA Europa League)	1	1	0	44	13
Porto	2011–12	Primeira Liga	21	3	2	1	3	1	8 (Note: Six appearances in UEFA Champions League, two appearances and one goal in UEFA Europa League)	1	2 (Note: One appearance in Supertaça Cândido de Oliveira, one appearance in UEFA Super Cup)	0	36	6
Porto	2012–13	Primeira Liga	25	4	1	0	3	0	8	2	1	0	38	6
Porto	2013–14	Primeira Liga	25	5	6	4	4	1	12 (Note: Six appearances in UEFA Champions League, six appearances and one goal in UEFA Europa League)	1	1	0	48	11
Porto	2015–16	Primeira Liga	22	3	6	0	3	0	3 (Note: One appearance in UEFA Champions League, two appearances in UEFA Europa League)	0	—		34	3
Porto	2016–17	Primeira Liga	4	0	1	0	1	0	1	0	—		7	0
Porto	Total		141	33	24	8	16	3	49	6	6	0	236	50
West Bromwich Albion (loan)	2014–15	Premier League	7	1	1	0	1	0	—		—		9	1
Parma (loan)	2014–15	Serie A	19	3	1	0	—		—		—		20	3
Kayserispor	2016–17	Süper Lig	15	0	2	0	—		—		—		17	0
Kayserispor	2017–18	Süper Lig	8	2	3	0	—		—		—		11	2
Kayserispor	2018–19	Süper Lig	32	1	4	1	—		—		—		36	2
Kayserispor	Total		55	3	9	1	—		—		—		64	4
B-SAD	2019–20	Primeira Liga	21	3	2	0	0	0	—		—		23	3
B-SAD	2020–21	Primeira Liga	31	0	3	0	—		—		—		34	0
B-SAD	Total		52	3	5	0	0	0	—		—		57	3
Porto B	2021–22	Liga Portugal 2	30	4	—		—		—		—		30	4
Career total			437	69	54	11	18	5	53	6	7	0	569	91

=== International ===
Portugal
Year	Apps	Goals
2010	2	0
2011	3	1
2012	10	2
2013	5	1
2014	6	1
2015	1	0
Total	27	5

Scores and results list Portugal's goal tally first, score column indicates score after each Varela goal.

#	Date	Venue	Opponent	Score	Result	Competition
1.	26 March 2011	Estádio Dr. Magalhães Pessoa, Leiria, Portugal	Chile	1–0	1–1	Friendly
2.	13 June 2012	Arena Lviv, Lviv, Ukraine	Denmark	3–2	3–2	UEFA Euro 2012
3.	11 September 2012	Estádio Municipal de Braga, Braga, Portugal	Azerbaijan	1–0	3–0	2014 World Cup qualification
4.	15 October 2013	Estádio Cidade de Coimbra, Coimbra, Portugal	Luxembourg	1–0	3–0	2014 World Cup qualification
5.	22 June 2014	Arena da Amazônia, Manaus, Brazil	United States	2–2	2–2	2014 FIFA World Cup

== Honours ==
Porto

- Primeira Liga: 2010–11, 2011–12, 2012–13
- Taça de Portugal: 2009–10, 2010–11
- Supertaça Cândido de Oliveira: 2009, 2010, 2011, 2012, 2013
- UEFA Europa League: 2010–11

Individual

- SJPF Young Player of the Month: January 2007, February 2007
