= 2009 Supertaça Cândido de Oliveira =

- Event: Supertaça Cândido de Oliveira (Portuguese Super Cup)
Porto	Paços de Ferreira
2	0
- Date: 9 August 2009
- Venue: Estádio Municipal de Aveiro, Aveiro
- Man of the Match: Ernesto Farías (Porto)
- Referee: Jorge Sousa
- Attendance: 15,722

The 2009 Supertaça Cândido de Oliveira was the 31st edition of the Supertaça Cândido de Oliveira, the annual Portuguese football season-opening match contested by the winners of the previous season's top league and cup competitions (or cup runner-up in case the league- and cup-winning club is the same). The match was contested by the 2008–09 Primeira Liga winners, Porto and the 2008–09 Taça de Portugal runners-up, Paços de Ferreira, as Porto also won the Taça de Portugal in the same season.

The final took place at the Estádio Municipal de Aveiro in Aveiro on 9 August 2009. Porto participated in their 25th Supertaça final, their fourth consecutive final since 2006. Porto went into the match as the Supertaça Cândido de Oliveira 15-time winners. Paços de Ferreira qualified for the competition for the first time in their history. Porto defeated Paços de Ferreira 2–0 with goals from Ernesto Farías and Bruno Alves. With this win, Porto raised their Supertaça tally to 16.

== Match ==
=== Details ===
9 August 2009
20:45 UTC

Porto	2–0	Paços de Ferreira
Farías 59'; Alves 89'

Estádio Municipal de Aveiro, Aveiro
Attendance: 15,722
Referee: Jorge Sousa

Porto	Paços de Ferreira

Porto:
GK	1	(Brazil) Helton
RB	13	(Uruguay) Jorge Fucile
CB	14	(Portugal) Rolando
CB	2	(Portugal) Bruno Alves (c)	(yellow card) 48'
LB	15	(Uruguay) Álvaro Pereira	(yellow card) 44'
DM	25	(Brazil) Fernando
CM	7	(Argentina) Fernando Belluschi		(substituted off) 46'
CM	3	(Portugal) Raul Meireles		(substituted off) 90'
RW	17	(Portugal) Silvestre Varela		(substituted off) 74'
LW	11	(Argentina) Mariano González
CF	12	(Brazil) Hulk
Substitutes:
GK	33	(Portugal) Nuno
DF	16	(Brazil) Maicon
DF	22	(Portugal) Miguel Lopes
MF	6	(Colombia) Fredy Guarín		(substituted on) 90'
MF	8	(Argentina) Diego Valeri
MF	20	(Argentina) Tomás Costa		(substituted on) 74'
FW	19	(Argentina) Ernesto Farías		(substituted on) 46'
Manager:
(Portugal) Jesualdo Ferreira

Paços de Ferreira:
GK	1	(Brazil) Cássio
RB	5	(Brazil) Ozéia	(yellow card) 72'	(substituted off) 82'
CB	15	(Brazil) Baiano
CB	17	(France) Kelly Berville
LB	14	(Portugal) Jorginho	(yellow card) 36'
DM	19	(Cape Verde) Ricardo
DM	96	(Portugal) Filipe Anunciação (c)		(substituted off) 65'
CM	8	(Portugal) Pedrinha		(substituted off) 68'
RW	15	(Brazil) Cristiano
LW	10	(Brazil) Leonel Olímpio	(yellow card) 56'
CF	20	(Portugal) Romeu Torres	(yellow card) 48'
Substitutes:
GK	84	(Portugal) Júlio Coelho
DF	7	(Brazil) Maykon
DF	37	(Portugal) Carlitos		(substituted on) 65'
MF	25	(Portugal) Fábio Pacheco
MF	77	(Portugal) José Coelho		(substituted on) 82'
FW	9	(Brazil) William		(substituted on) 68'
FW	11	(Brazil) Leandrinho
Manager:
(Portugal) Paulo Sérgio

2009 Supertaça Cândido de Oliveira Winners
Porto
16th Title

Man of the match

- (Argentina) Ernesto Farías (Porto)

Match officials

- Assistant referees:
  - José Cardinal (Porto)
  - Tiago Trigo (Lisbon)
- Fourth official: Vasco Santos (Porto)

Match rules

- 90 minutes
- Penalty shoot-out if scores level after 90 minutes
- Seven named substitutes
- Maximum of three substitutions

== See also ==
- 2009–10 Primeira Liga
- 2009–10 Taça de Portugal
- 2009–10 Taça da Liga
- 2009–10 FC Porto season
