= Ivanildo =

Ivanildo is a given name. People named Ivanildo include:

- Ivanildo Cassamá (born 1986), Guinea-Bissauan footballer
- Ivanildo Fernandes (born 1996), Portuguese footballer
- Ivanildo Misidjan (born 1993), Surinamese footballer
- Ivanildo Rodrigues (born 1988), Brazilian-born Qatari footballer
- Ivanildo Rozenblad (1996–2021), Surinamese footballer
- Marcio Ivanildo da Silva (born 1981), Brazilian footballer
