= Sebastián Prediger =

Argentine footballer

Personal information
- Full name: Leonardo Sebastián Prediger
- Date of birth: 4 September 1986 (age 40)
- Place of birth: Crespo, Argentina
- Height: 1.84 m (6 ft 0 in)
- Position: Defensive midfielder

Team information
- Current team: Colón

Youth career
- Colón

Senior career*
Years	Team	Apps	(Gls)
2004–2009	Colón	50	(3)
2004–2005	→ Atlético Uruguay (loan)	8	(1)
2007	→ Millonarios (loan)	0	(0)
2009–2012	Porto	0	(0)
2010	→ Boca Juniors (loan)	3	(0)
2010	→ Cruzeiro (loan)	0	(0)
2011–2012	→ Colón (loan)	52	(2)
2012–2014	Colón	44	(4)
2014	→ Baniyas (loan)	5	(0)
2014	Estudiantes LP	15	(0)
2015–2017	Belgrano	37	(1)
2016–2017	→ Newell's Old Boys (loan)	17	(1)
2017–2018	San Martín Tucumán	10	(0)
2018–2023	Tigre	128	(3)
2024–	Colón	31	(0)

International career
2009	Argentina	1	(0)
- * Club domestic league appearances and goals as of 7 September 2024

Sebastián Prediger (born 4 September 1986) is an Argentine professional footballer who plays as a midfielder for Colón.

== Club career ==
Prediger began his career on youth side for Colón and made his professional debut for Colón in a 1–0 defeat by Gimnasia de Jujuy on 20 October 2007.

He spend time on loan with Atlético Uruguay in the regionalized third division of Argentine football and in the Colombian club Millonarios. On 27 July 2009, Porto signed the Argentine midfielder from Colón on a three-year deal and for around €3 million. At the end of the January transfer window he was loaned out to Boca Juniors until the end of the season. On 19 August, Prediger was on loaned to Brazilian club Cruzeiro.

In January 2014, Prediger signed a loan deal with UAE Arabian Gulf League side Baniyas.

On 2 January 2024, Prediger returned to Colón.

== International career ==
On 20 May 2009, Prediger made his international debut in a friendly match against Panama. He came on as a second-half substitute in the 3–1 win for the Argentina team, made up of players based in the Primera División Argentina.

== Career statistics ==
Appearances and goals by club, season and competition
Club	Season	League			National cup		League cup		Continental		Other		Total	
Club	Season	Division	Apps	Goals	Apps	Goals	Apps	Goals	Apps	Goals	Apps	Goals	Apps	Goals
Colón	2007–08	Primera División	17	1	—		—		—		—		17	1
Colón	2008–09	Primera División	33	3	—		—		—		—		33	3
Colón	Total		50	4	—		—		—		—		50	4
Atlético Uruguay (loan)	2004–05	Cuarta División	8	1	—		—		—		—		8	1
Millonarios (loan)	2007	Categoría Primera A	0	0	—		—		0	0	—		0	0
Porto	2009–10	Primeira Liga	0	0	1	0	2	0	—		—		3	0
Boca Juniors (loan)	2009–10	Primera División	3	0	—		—		—		—		3	0
Colón (loan)	2010–11	Primera División	18	0	—		—		—		—		18	0
Colón (loan)	2011–12	Primera División	34	2	1	0	—		4	0	—		39	2
Colón	2012–13	Primera División	28	3	0	0	—		—		—		28	3
Colón	2013–14	Primera División	16	1	—		—		—		—		16	1
Colón	Total		96	6	1	0	—		4	0	—		101	6
Baniyas (loan)	2013–14	UAE Pro League	5	0	0	0	—		1	0	—		6	0
Estudiantes LP (loan)	2014	Primera División	15	0	2	0	—		1	0	—		18	0
Belgrano	2015	Primera División	28	1	0	0	—		2	0	—		30	1
Belgrano	2016	Primera División	9	0	0	0	—		—		—		9	0
Belgrano	Total		37	1	0	0	—		2	0	—		39	1
Newell's Old Boys (loan)	2016–17	Primera División	17	1	0	0	—		—		—		17	1
San Martín Tucumán	2017–18	Primera B Nacional	10	0	—		—		—		—		17	1
Colón	2017–18	Primera División	12	0	2	0	—		—		—		14	0
Colón	2018–19	Primera División	21	0	0	0	3	0	—		1	0	17	1
Colón	2019–20	Primera Nacional	17	1	—		—		1	0	—		18	1
Colón	2020	Primera Nacional	8	1	—		—		3	0	—		12	0
Colón	2021	Primera Nacional	31	1	4	0	—		—		1	0	36	1
Colón	2022	Primera División	21	0	1	0	17	0	—		1	0	40	0
Colón	2023	Primera División	18	0	0	0	11	0	4	0	—		33	0
Colón	Total		128	3	7	0	31	0	8	0	3	0	177	3
Colón	2024	Primera Nacional	31	0	0	0	—		—		—		31	0
Career total			400	16	11	0	36	0	16	0	3	0	466	16

== Honours ==
Porto

- Taça de Portugal: 2009–10
