= Ernesto Farías =

Argentine footballer

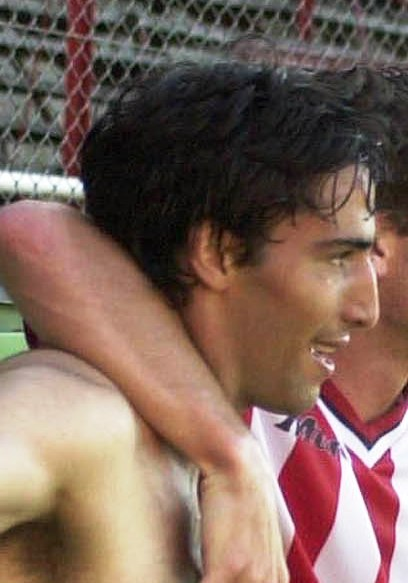
- Farías as an Estudiantes player

Personal information
- Full name: Ernesto Antonio Farías
- Date of birth: 29 May 1980 (age 46)
- Place of birth: Trenque Lauquen, Argentina
- Height: 1.77 m (5 ft 10 in)
- Position: Striker

Youth career
- Football Club Argentino

Senior career*
Years	Team	Apps	(Gls)
1997–2004	Estudiantes	206	(93)
2004–2005	Palermo	13	(0)
2005–2007	River Plate	67	(35)
2007–2010	Porto	54	(23)
2010–2014	Cruzeiro	25	(5)
2012–2013	→ Independiente (loan)	42	(12)
2014–2015	Danubio	7	(1)
2015–2017	América Cali	69	(29)
Total		483	(198)

International career
1999	Argentina U20	3	(0)
2005	Argentina	1	(0)
- * Club domestic league appearances and goals

Ernesto Antonio Farías, better known as Tecla Farías, (born 29 May 1980) is an Argentine former professional footballer who played as a striker.

== Club career ==
Born in Trenque Lauquen, Buenos Aires Province, Farías started playing professionally in 1997 for Estudiantes de La Plata, making his Primera División debut in a 2–2 draw against Club Atlético Lanús, 19 days shy of his 18th birthday. From his third season onwards he never scored less than 14 league goals, including 12 in the 2003 Apertura alone, a competition-best, as his team ranked in midtable.

Farías left Estudiantes as their fifth-ever goal scorer, netting nearly one goal every two games. He signed with Italian club U.S. Città di Palermo for the 2004–05 campaign, teaming up with compatriot Mariano González and appearing in only 13 Serie A matches, going scoreless in the process.

Subsequently, Farías returned to his country and joined Club Atlético River Plate, being crowned top scorer in the 2006 edition of the Copa Libertadores at five (tied with 13 other players) as the Buenos Aires side reached the quarter-finals. In late July 2007, after a failed transfer to Deportivo Toluca F.C. for personal reasons, he signed a four-year contract for FC Porto in a €4 million deal.

During his three-year spell in Portugal, Farías was mostly used as a substitute, consecutively barred by Lisandro López, Hulk and Radamel Falcao. He still managed to contribute solidly to the conquest of five major titles by scoring 34 official goals, 23 of those coming in the Primeira Liga.

In January 2010, Farías had everything arranged with Cruzeiro Esporte Clube as part of the deal involving Kléber, but the move eventually collapsed. In late July he finally joined the Brazilians, agreeing on a three-year contract; he scored his first goal for the club on 5 September, in a 3–2 away win over Sociedade Esportiva Palmeiras.

In late January 2012, Farías returned to his country and signed with Club Atlético Independiente, on loan.

== International career ==
On 3 September 2005, Farías won his first – and only – cap for the Argentina national team, in a 0–1 away loss against Paraguay for the 2006 FIFA World Cup qualifiers. Previously, in 1999, he appeared for the under-20s in the World Cup held in Nigeria, playing in three games in an eventual round-of-16 exit.

== Personal life ==
Farías was nicknamed El Tecla ("The key"), because in his early adolescence years his uneven teeth were likened to a piano.

== Honours ==
=== Club ===
Porto

- Primeira Liga: 2007–08, 2008–09
- Taça de Portugal: 2008–09, 2009–10
- Supertaça Cândido de Oliveira: 2009

Cruzeiro

- Campeonato Mineiro: 2011

América

- Categoría Primera B: 2016

=== International ===
Argentina

- South American Youth Championship: 1999

=== Individual ===
- Argentine Primera División top scorer: Apertura 2003
- Copa Libertadores top scorer: 2006
