= Sérgio Barge =

Portuguese footballer

Personal information
- Full name: Sérgio Filipe Silva Barge
- Date of birth: 4 January 1984 (age 42)
- Place of birth: Válega, Portugal
- Height: 1.74 m (5 ft 8 1/2 in)
- Positions: Right-back; midfielder

Youth career
- 1993–1999: Porto
- 1999–2003: Feirense

Senior career*
Years	Team	Apps	(Gls)
2003–2007	Feirense	53	(3)
2005–2006	→ Sanjoanense (loan)	22	(3)
2008–2009	Estoril	25	(5)
2009–2011	Belenenses	49	(2)
2011–2012	Oliveirense	13	(0)
2012–2013	Alki Larnaca	38	(0)
2013–2018	Feirense	143	(2)
Total		343	(15)
- * Club domestic league appearances and goals

Sérgio Filipe Silva Barge (born 4 January 1984 in Válega, Ovar) is a Portuguese former professional footballer who played as a right-back or a midfielder.
