= Cristian Săpunaru =

Romanian footballer (born 1984)

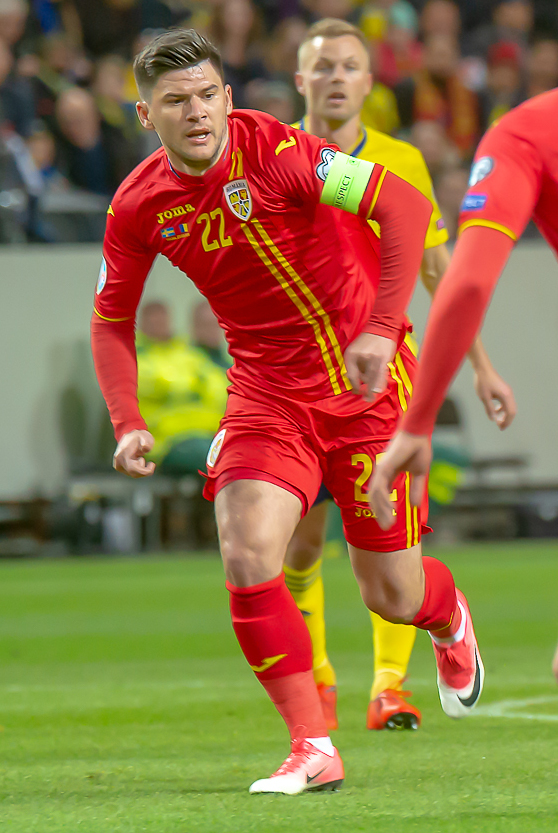
- Săpunaru captaining Romania in 2019

Personal information
- Full name: Cristian Ionuț Săpunaru
- Date of birth: 5 April 1984 (age 42)
- Place of birth: Bucharest, Romania
- Height: 1.87 m (6 ft 2 in)
- Positions: Defender; defensive midfielder

Youth career
- 1990–2002: Național București

Senior career*
Years	Team	Apps	(Gls)
2002–2006	Național București	34	(3)
2003–2004	→ Callatis Mangalia (loan)	10	(0)
2006–2008	Rapid București	51	(3)
2008–2012	Porto	56	(2)
2010	→ Rapid București (loan)	10	(3)
2012–2013	Zaragoza	29	(2)
2013–2014	Elche	8	(1)
2015	Rapid București	13	(4)
2015–2016	Pandurii Târgu Jiu	22	(5)
2016–2017	Astra Giurgiu	32	(8)
2017–2019	Kayserispor	59	(2)
2019	Denizlispor	14	(0)
2020–2021	Kayserispor	38	(1)
2021–2025	Rapid București	121	(6)
Total		497	(40)

International career
2006	Romania U21	3	(0)
2008–2019	Romania	36	(0)
- * Club domestic league appearances and goals as of 19 May 2025

Cristian Ionuț Săpunaru (born 5 April 1984) is a Romanian former professional footballer who played mainly as a centre-back. He also played as a right-back or a defensive midfielder.

Săpunaru began his senior career with Național București in 2002, before going on to make a name for himself at Rapid București four years later. In 2008 he signed with Porto in Portugal, where he won ten major honours over the course of four years, including the 2010–11 UEFA Europa League. After two additional seasons in Spain featuring for Zaragoza and Elche, Săpunaru spent his late years with stints between his native country and Turkey.

A full international for Romania between 2008 and 2019, he amassed 36 caps and represented the nation in two European Championships.

== Club career ==
=== Early career and Porto ===
Săpunaru was born in Bucharest and is a product of Național București, joining its youth system at the age of only six. He signed for Rapid București in July 2006, and two years later was sold for €2.5 million to Porto as a replacement for Chelsea-bound José Bosingwa. Săpunaru agreed to a five-year contract, with the Primeira Liga club owning 50% of the player's economic rights, while Romanian sources indicated the price was actually €6 million plus two players.

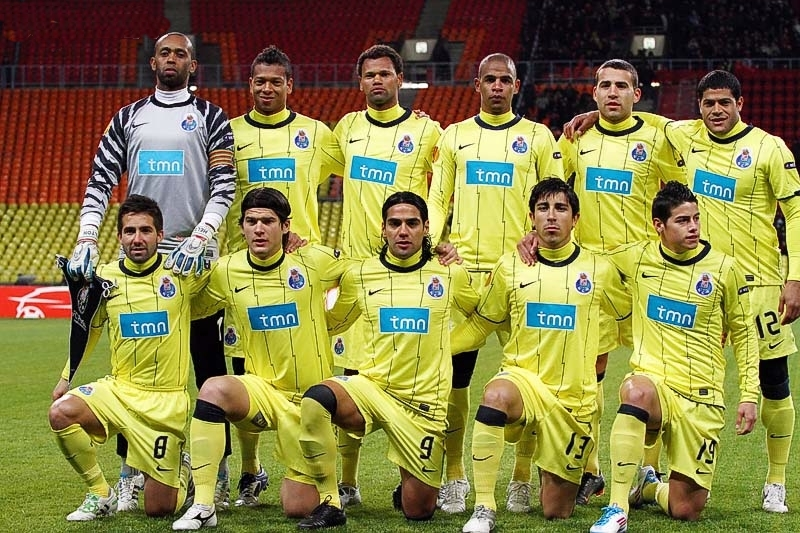
Săpunaru (bottom row, second from left) with FC Porto in 2011

During his debut campaign, Săpunaru was the first-choice right-back as the northerners achieved a double, and scored his first goal in a 1–2 away loss against Nacional for the Taça da Liga. In early February 2010, he was suspended in Portugal–as his teammate Hulk–following incidents during a 0–1 league defeat at Benfica, so he returned to his country for a five-month loan with former side Rapid; he did not manage to be played regularly at Porto during that time but, following his return for the 2010–11 season, became a very important first-team unit as they won three major titles, appearing in 40 official games in the process.

On 17 February 2014, Săpunaru was condemned to pay a €90,000 fine for his participation in the assault of two stewards at the Estádio da Luz on 20 December 2009.

=== Spain ===
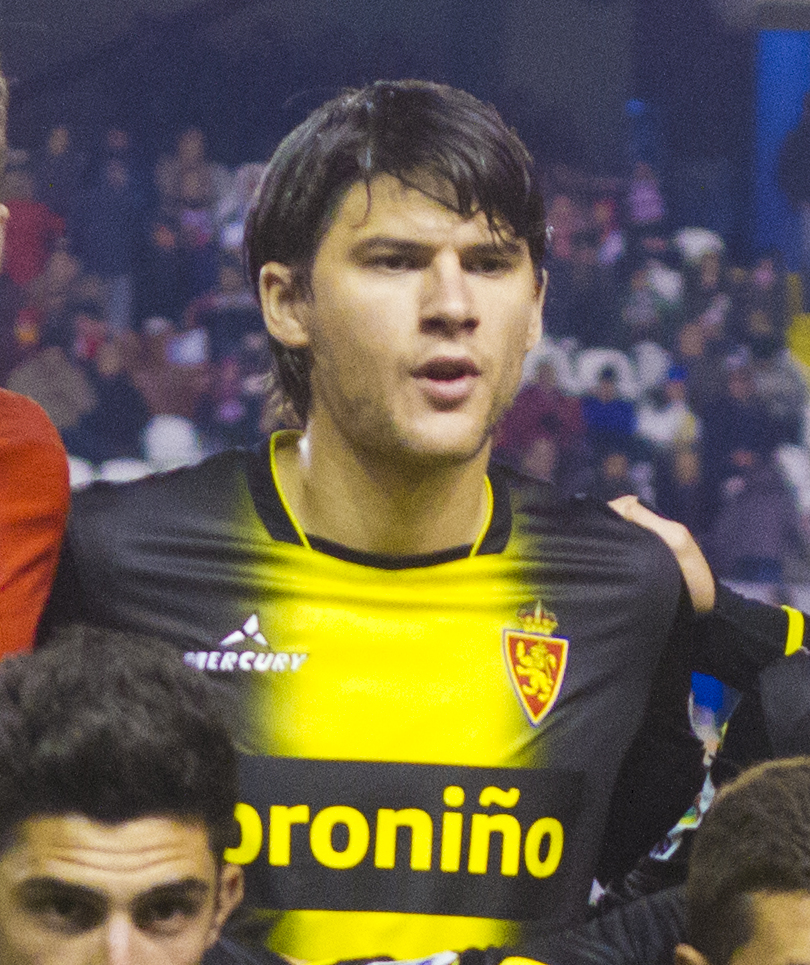
Săpunaru with Real Zaragoza in 2012

On 31 August 2012, Săpunaru signed a one-year contract with La Liga club Real Zaragoza. He made his official debut on 16 September, playing the full 90 minutes in a 0–2 loss at Real Sociedad.

In his first season in Aragon, Săpunaru started but also suffered team relegation. He also entered his name in the competition's history books, after breaking the record for the most bookings in a single campaign (19 yellow cards and one red).

After initially hesitating because of the requests of his partner, Săpunaru signed a one-year deal at fellow league team Elche on 25 July 2013. He totalled only nine appearances in his only campaign and was also sent off twice, while his sole goal opened a 1–2 loss at Valencian Community neighbours Levante on 13 December.

Elche could not support Săpunaru's €1 million wage demands, and released him on 21 August 2014. In October 2015, he took the club to court for the wages remaining in his contract.

=== Later career ===
After four months back at Rapid, Săpunaru signed a season-long deal at Pandurii Târgu Jiu on 6 September 2015, including a clause that he could leave instantly if a foreign club wanted him. The following 21 July, he put pen to paper to a two-year contract with fellow league side Astra Giurgiu.

On 1 July 2017, it was announced that Săpunaru signed a two-year deal with Turkish Süper Lig team Kayserispor. At its expiration, he joined Denizlispor in the same competition, before returning to his previous employer in January 2020 for the rest of the season. In August, he signed a new one-year deal.

Săpunaru signed for Rapid for the fourth time on 4 July 2021, joining on a two-year contract at the age of 37.

=== Retirement ===
On 19 May 2025, Săpunaru played his last professional match against CFR Cluj at the 2024–25 SuperLiga Play-off round.

== International career ==
Săpunaru made his debut for the Romania national team on 31 May 2008 against Montenegro, and was selected to the nation's squad at UEFA Euro 2008, although he did not play in the final stages. From June 2011 to November 2015, he did not appear in any games for his country due to a conflict with manager Victor Pițurcă.

On 17 May 2016, Săpunaru was picked by manager Anghel Iordănescu for his Euro 2016 squad. He started at right-back in the group stage opener, a 1–2 loss against the hosts France. In September 2019, after amassing 36 caps over the course of eleven years, 35-year-old Săpunaru announced his retirement from the national team.

== Career statistics ==
=== Club ===
Appearances and goals by club, season and competition
Club	Season	League			National cup (Note: Includes Cupa României, Taça de Portugal, Copa del Rey and Turkish Cup)		Continental		Other		Total	
Club	Season	Division	Apps	Goals	Apps	Goals	Apps	Goals	Apps	Goals	Apps	Goals
Național București	2002–03	Divizia A	4	0	0	0	—		—		4	0
Național București	2003–04	Divizia A	1	0	2	0	—		—		3	0
Național București	2004–05	Divizia A	6	0	2	0	—		—		8	0
Național București	2005–06	Divizia A	23	3	5	0	—		—		28	3
Național București	Total		34	3	9	0	—		—		43	3
Callatis Mangalia (loan)	2003–04	Divizia B	10	0	—		—		—		10	0
Rapid București	2006–07	Liga I	19	1	3	0	6 (Note: Appearances in UEFA Cup)	0	1 (Note: Appearance in Supercupa României)	0	29	1
Rapid București	2007–08	Liga I	32	2	2	0	2	0	1	0	37	2
Rapid București	Total		51	3	5	0	8	0	2	0	66	3
Porto	2008–09	Primeira Liga	17	0	2	0	8 (Note: Appearances in UEFA Champions League)	0	5 (Note: One appearance in Supertaça Cândido de Oliveira, four appearances and one goal in Taça da Liga)	1	32	1
Porto	2009–10	Primeira Liga	5	0	0	0	4	0	0	0	9	0
Porto	2010–11	Primeira Liga	19	0	7	0	13 (Note: Appearances in UEFA Europa League)	0	2 (Note: One appearance in Supertaça Cândido de Oliveira, one appearances in Taça da Liga)	0	41	0
Porto	2011–12	Primeira Liga	15	2	1	0	2 (Note: One appearance in UEFA Champions League, one appearance in UEFA Europa League)	0	3 (Note: One appearance in Supertaça Cândido de Oliveira, one appearances in UEFA Super Cup, one appearance in Taça da Liga)	0	21	2
Porto	Total		56	2	10	0	27	0	10	1	103	3
Rapid București (loan)	2009–10	Liga I	10	3	—		—		—		10	3
Zaragoza	2012–13	La Liga	29	2	6	0	—		—		35	2
Elche	2013–14	La Liga	8	1	1	0	—		—		9	1
Rapid București	2014–15	Liga I	13	4	—		—		—		13	4
Pandurii Târgu Jiu	2015–16	Liga I	22	5	2	1	—		0	0	24	6
Astra Giurgiu	2016–17	Liga I	32	8	5	1	12 (Note: Two appearances in UEFA Champions League, ten appearances and one goal in UEFA Europa League)	1	0	0	49	10
Kayserispor	2017–18	Süper Lig	28	0	5	0	—		—		33	0
Kayserispor	2018–19	Süper Lig	31	2	3	1	—		—		34	3
Kayserispor	Total		59	2	8	1	—		—		67	3
Denizlispor	2019–20	Süper Lig	14	0	1	0	—		—		15	0
Kayserispor	2019–20	Süper Lig	13	1	—		—		—		13	1
Kayserispor	2020–21	Süper Lig	25	0	0	0	—		—		25	0
Kayserispor	Total		38	1	0	0	—		—		38	1
Rapid București	2021–22	Liga I	36	1	1	0	—		—		37	1
Rapid București	2022–23	Liga I	39	4	2	0	—		—		41	4
Rapid București	2023–24	Liga I	37	1	1	0	—		—		38	1
Rapid București	2024–25	Liga I	9	0	0	0	—		—		9	0
Rapid București	Total		121	6	4	0	—		—		125	6
Career total			497	40	51	3	47	1	12	1	607	45

=== International ===
Appearances and goals by national team and year
National team	Year	Apps	Goals
Romania	2008	3	0
Romania	2009	3	0
Romania	2010	1	0
Romania	2011	2	0
Romania	2015	1	0
Romania	2016	10	0
Romania	2017	3	0
Romania	2018	10	0
Romania	2019	3	0
Total		36	0

== Honours ==
Național București

- Cupa României runner-up: 2005–06

Rapid București

- Cupa României: 2006–07
- Supercupa României: 2007

Porto

- Primeira Liga: 2008–09, 2010–11, 2011–12
- Taça de Portugal: 2008–09, 2010–11
- Supertaça Cândido de Oliveira: 2009, 2010, 2011, 2012
- UEFA Europa League: 2010–11
- UEFA Super Cup runner-up: 2011

Astra Giurgiu

- Cupa României runner-up: 2016–17

Individual

- Gazeta Sporturilor Romanian Footballer of the Year third place: 2011
- Gazeta Sporturilor Romania Player of the Month: August 2021
