= 2010–11 S.C. Braga season =

S.C. Braga
2010–11 season
- Manager: Domingos
- Stadium: Estádio Municipal de Braga
- Primeira Liga: 4th
- Taça de Portugal: Fourth round
- Europa League: Runners-up

The 2010–11 season was the 90th season in the existence of S.C. Braga and the club's 15th consecutive season in the top flight of Portuguese football. In addition to the domestic league, Braga participated in this season's editions of the Taça de Portugal and the UEFA Europa League.

== Season summary ==
Braga endured a poor start to the 2010–11 season, including elimination from the Champions League in the group stage, in their first ever appearance in that competition. Results picked up and Braga finished the season in fourth. Greater success came in the Europa League, however, as Braga reached the final - their first and, as of 2021, only European final. André Villas-Boas' FC Porto won the final to complete a treble of the Portuguese league and cup and Europa League. Manager Domingos, who had announced his departure from Braga prior to the Europa League final, stuck to his word and departed for Sporting CP. Leonardo Jardim, most recently of Beira-Mar, was appointed as his successor.

== Players ==
=== First team squad ===
Squad at end of season

Note: Flags indicate national team as defined under FIFA eligibility rules; some limited exceptions apply. Players may hold more than one non-FIFA nationality.

No.	Pos.	Nation	Player
1	GK	BRA	Artur
2	DF	PER	Alberto Rodríguez
3	DF	BRA	Paulão
4	DF	BRA	Kaká (on loan from Hertha BSC)
6	MF	BRA	Vinícius
7	MF	POR	Ukra (on loan from Porto)
8	MF	BRA	Márcio Mossoró
9	FW	BRA	Paulo César
10	MF	POR	Hélder Barbosa
11	FW	SEN	Ladji Keita
12	GK	POR	Quim
15	DF	POR	Miguel Garcia
18	FW	BRA	Lima
19	FW	CMR	Albert Meyong

No.	Pos.	Nation	Player
20	DF	NGR	Elderson Echiéjilé
23	MF	ARG	Andrés Madrid
25	DF	BRA	Leandro Salino
26	GK	BRA	Marcos
27	MF	POR	Custódio Castro
28	DF	POR	Sílvio
30	MF	BRA	Alan
32	DF	POR	Marco Ramos (Note: Ramos was born in Levallois-Perret, France, but also qualified to represent Portugal internationally and represented Portugal at U-19 level.)
40	MF	BRA	Guilherme
42	GK	POR	Cristiano (Note: Cristiano was born in Munich, Germany, but also qualified to represent Portugal internationally and represented Portugal at U-20 and U-21 level.)
45	MF	POR	Hugo Viana
46	MF	HAI	Peterson Joseph
48	DF	POR	Aníbal Capela
88	MF	BRA	Vandinho (captain)

=== Left club during season ===
Note: Flags indicate national team as defined under FIFA eligibility rules; some limited exceptions apply. Players may hold more than one non-FIFA nationality.

No.	Pos.	Nation	Player
4	DF	BRA	George Lucas (to Avaí)
5	DF	BRA	Moisés (to Al-Rayyan)
7	MF	POR	Pizzi (on loan to Paços de Ferreira)
13	DF	BRA	Eduardo Neto (on loan from Villa Rio)
16	DF	BRA	Léo Fortunato (on loan from Cruzeiro)
21	FW	ESP	José Collado (on loan to Atlético Madrid B)

No.	Pos.	Nation	Player
22	MF	URU	Luis Aguiar (on loan from Dynamo Moscow)
84	GK	BRA	Felipe (on loan from Olé Brasil)
85	FW	BRA	Élton (on loan from Olé Brasil)
90	GK	POR	Diego (on loan to Naval)
99	FW	BRA	Matheus (to FC Dnipro)

== Competitions ==
=== Overview ===
Competition	First match	Last match	Starting round	Final position	Record							
Competition	First match	Last match	Starting round	Final position	Pld	W	D	L	GF	GA	GD	Win %
Primeira Liga	13 August 2010	14 May 2011	Matchday 1	4th	30	13	7	10	45	33	+12	43.33
Taça de Portugal	10 October 2010	12 December 2010	Third round	Fourth round	2	1	0	1	2	3	−1	50.00
UEFA Champions League	28 July 2010	8 December 2010	Third qualifying round	Group stage	10	6	0	4	14	16	−2	60.00
UEFA Europa League	17 February 2011	18 May 2011	Round of 32	Runners-up	9	3	3	3	6	5	+1	33.33
Total					51	23	10	18	67	57	+10	45.10

Source: Soccerway

=== Primeira Liga ===
==== League table ====
Pos	Team	Pld	W	D	L	GF	GA	GD	Pts	Qualification or relegation
2	Benfica	30	20	3	7	61	31	+30	63	Qualification to Champions League third qualifying round
3	Sporting CP	30	13	9	8	41	31	+10	48	Qualification to Europa League play-off round
4	Braga	30	13	7	10	45	33	+12	46	Qualification to Europa League play-off round
5	Vitória de Guimarães	30	12	7	11	36	37	−1	43	Qualification to Europa League third qualifying round
6	Nacional	30	11	9	10	28	31	−3	42	Qualification to Europa League second qualifying round (Note: The 2010–11 Taça de Portugal competition was won by Champions League-qualified side Porto. Since cup runners-up Vitória de Guimarães secured a place in the European competitions via league position, the spot allocation for the 2011–12 UEFA Europa League effectively reverted to league positions.)

Source: LPFP (in Portuguese)
Rules for classification: 1) Points; 2) Head-to-head points; 3) Head-to-head goal difference; 4) Head-to-head away goals scored; 5) Goal difference; 6) Matches won; 7) Goals scored; 8) Play-off.
(Note: LPFP decided that only criteria 1, 5, 6 and 7 would be applied to establish the classification during the competition.)
