= 2010–11 UEFA Europa League knockout phase =

The knockout phase of the 2010–11 UEFA Europa League began on 15 February and concluded on 18 May 2011 with the final at Aviva Stadium in Dublin, Ireland. The knockout phase involved 32 teams: the 24 teams that finished in the top two in each group in the group stage and the eight teams that finished in third place in the UEFA Champions League group stage.

Times up to end of March are CET (UTC+1), thereafter times are CEST (UTC+2).

== Format ==
Each tie in the knockout phase, apart from the final, was played over two legs, with each team playing one leg at home. The team that had the higher aggregate score over the two legs progressed to the next round. In the event that aggregate scores finished level, the away goals rule was applied, i.e. the team that scored more goals away from home over the two legs progressed. If away goals were also equal, then 30 minutes of extra time were played, divided into two halves of 15 minutes each. The away goals rule was again applied after extra time, i.e. if there were goals scored during extra time and the aggregate score was still level, the visiting team qualified by virtue of more away goals scored. If no goals were scored during extra time, the tie waa decided via a penalty shoot-out. In the final, the tie was played as a single match. If scores were level at the end of normal time in the final, extra time was played, followed by penalties if scores remained tied.

In the draw for the round of 32, the twelve group winners and the four better third-placed teams from the Champions League group stage (based on their match record in the group stage) were seeded, and the twelve group runners-up and the other four third-placed teams from the Champions League group stage were unseeded. A seeded team was drawn against an unseeded team, with the seeded team hosting the second leg. Teams from the same group or the same association could not be drawn against each other. In the draws for the round of 16 onwards, there were no seedings, and teams from the same group or the same association could be drawn with each other.

== Round and draw dates ==
All draws held at UEFA headquarters in Nyon, Switzerland.

Phase	Round	Draw date and time	First leg	Second leg
Knockout phase	Round of 32	17 December 2010; 13:00 CET	17 February 2011	24 February 2011
Knockout phase	Round of 16	17 December 2010; 13:00 CET	10 March 2011	17 March 2011
Knockout phase	Quarter-finals	18 March 2011; 13:00 CET	7 April 2011	14 April 2011
Knockout phase	Semi-finals	18 March 2011; 13:00 CET	28 April 2011	5 May 2011
Knockout phase	Final	18 March 2011; 13:00 CET	18 May 2011 at Aviva Stadium, Dublin	

Matches may also be played on Tuesdays or Wednesdays instead of the regular Thursdays due to scheduling conflicts.

== Qualified teams ==
Key to colours
Seeded in round of 32 draw
Unseeded in round of 32 draw

=== Teams advancing from group stage ===
Group	Winners	Runners-up
A	(England) Manchester City	(Poland) Lech Poznań
B	(Germany) Bayer Leverkusen	(Greece) Aris
C	(Portugal) Sporting CP	(France) Lille
D	(Spain) Villarreal	(Greece) PAOK
E	(Ukraine) Dynamo Kyiv	(Belarus) BATE Borisov
F	(Russia) CSKA Moscow	(Czech Republic) Sparta Prague
G	(Russia) Zenit Saint Petersburg	(Belgium) Anderlecht
H	(Germany) VfB Stuttgart	(Switzerland) Young Boys
I	(Netherlands) PSV Eindhoven	(Ukraine) Metalist Kharkiv
J	(France) Paris Saint-Germain	(Spain) Sevilla
K	(England) Liverpool	(Italy) Napoli
L	(Portugal) Porto	(Turkey) Beşiktaş

=== Champions League group stage third-placed teams ===
Seed	Grp	Team	Pld	W	D	L	GF	GA	GD	Pts	Seeding
1	F	(Russia) Spartak Moscow	6	3	0	3	7	10	−3	9	Seeded in round of 32 draw
2	H	(Portugal) Braga	6	3	0	3	5	11	−6	9	Seeded in round of 32 draw
3	G	(Netherlands) Ajax	6	2	1	3	6	10	−4	7	Seeded in round of 32 draw
4	A	(Netherlands) Twente	6	1	3	2	9	11	−2	6	Seeded in round of 32 draw
5	D	(Russia) Rubin Kazan	6	1	3	2	2	4	−2	6	Unseeded in round of 32 draw
6	E	(Switzerland) Basel	6	2	0	4	8	11	−3	6	Unseeded in round of 32 draw
7	C	(Scotland) Rangers	6	1	3	2	3	6	−3	6	Unseeded in round of 32 draw
8	B	(Portugal) Benfica	6	2	0	4	7	12	−5	6	Unseeded in round of 32 draw

Source: UEFA
Rules for classification: 1) Points; 2) Goal difference; 3) Goals scored; 4) Club coefficient.

== Bracket ==
Round of 32
(Greece) PAOK	0	1	1
(Russia) CSKA Moscow	1	1	2
(Spain) Sevilla	1	1	2
(Portugal) Porto (a)	2	0	2
(Belgium) Anderlecht	0	0	0
(Netherlands) Ajax	2	3	5
(Switzerland) Basel	2	1	3
(Russia) Spartak Moscow	3	1	4
(Ukraine) Metalist Kharkiv	0	0	0
(Germany) Bayer Leverkusen	2	4	6
(Italy) Napoli	0	1	1
(Spain) Villarreal	0	2	2
(Russia) Rubin Kazan	0	2	2
(Netherlands) Twente	2	2	4
(Switzerland) Young Boys	2	1	3
(Russia) Zenit Saint Petersburg	1	3	4
(Portugal) Benfica	2	2	4
(Germany) VfB Stuttgart	1	0	1
(Belarus) BATE Borisov	2	0	2
(France) Paris Saint-Germain (a)	2	0	2
(France) Lille	2	1	3
(Netherlands) PSV Eindhoven	2	3	5
(Scotland) Rangers (a)	1	2	3
(Portugal) Sporting CP	1	2	3
(Turkey) Beşiktaş	1	0	1
(Ukraine) Dynamo Kyiv	4	4	8
(Greece) Aris	0	0	0
(England) Manchester City	0	3	3
(Poland) Lech Poznań	1	0	1
(Portugal) Braga	0	2	2
(Czech Republic) Sparta Prague	0	0	0
(England) Liverpool	0	1	1

Round of 16
(Russia) CSKA Moscow	0	1	1
(Portugal) Porto	1	2	3
(Netherlands) Ajax	0	0	0
(Russia) Spartak Moscow	1	3	4
(Germany) Bayer Leverkusen	2	1	3
(Spain) Villarreal	3	2	5
(Netherlands) Twente	3	0	3
(Russia) Zenit Saint Petersburg	0	2	2
(Portugal) Benfica	2	1	3
(France) Paris Saint-Germain	1	1	2
(Netherlands) PSV Eindhoven	0	1	1
(Scotland) Rangers	0	0	0
(Ukraine) Dynamo Kyiv	2	0	2
(England) Manchester City	0	1	1
(Portugal) Braga	1	0	1
(England) Liverpool	0	0	0

Quarter-finals
(Portugal) Porto	5	5	10
(Russia) Spartak Moscow	1	2	3
(Spain) Villarreal	5	3	8
(Netherlands) Twente	1	1	2
(Portugal) Benfica	4	2	6
(Netherlands) PSV Eindhoven	1	2	3
(Ukraine) Dynamo Kyiv	1	0	1
(Portugal) Braga (a)	1	0	1

Semi-finals
(Portugal) Porto	5	2	7
(Spain) Villarreal	1	3	4
(Portugal) Benfica	2	0	2
(Portugal) Braga (a)	1	1	2

Final
18 May – Dublin
(Portugal) Porto	1
(Portugal) Braga	0

== Round of 32 ==
=== Summary ===
The first legs were played on 15 and 17 February, and the second legs were played on 22, 23 and 24 February 2011.

Team 1	Agg.	Team 2	1st leg	2nd leg
Napoli (Italy)	1–2	(Spain) Villarreal	0–0	1–2
Rangers (Scotland)	3–3 (a)	(Portugal) Sporting CP	1–1	2–2
Sparta Prague (Czech Republic)	0–1	(England) Liverpool	0–0	0–1
Anderlecht (Belgium)	0–5	(Netherlands) Ajax	0–3	0–2
Lech Poznań (Poland)	1–2	(Portugal) Braga	1–0	0–2
Beşiktaş (Turkey)	1–8	(Ukraine) Dynamo Kyiv	1–4	0–4
Basel (Switzerland)	3–4	(Russia) Spartak Moscow	2–3	1–1
Young Boys (Switzerland)	3–4	(Russia) Zenit Saint Petersburg	2–1	1–3
Aris (Greece)	0–3	(England) Manchester City	0–0	0–3
PAOK (Greece)	1–2	(Russia) CSKA Moscow	0–1	1–1
Sevilla (Spain)	2–2 (a)	(Portugal) Porto	1–2	1–0
Rubin Kazan (Russia)	2–4	(Netherlands) Twente	0–2	2–2
Lille (France)	3–5	(Netherlands) PSV Eindhoven	2–2	1–3
Benfica (Portugal)	4–1	(Germany) VfB Stuttgart	2–1	2–0
BATE Borisov (Belarus)	2–2 (a)	(France) Paris Saint-Germain	2–2	0–0
Metalist Kharkiv (Ukraine)	0–6	(Germany) Bayer Leverkusen	0–4	0–2

=== Matches ===
17 February 2011
19:00

Napoli (Italy)	0–0	(Spain) Villarreal
	Report

Stadio San Paolo, Naples
Attendance: 47,529
Referee: Mark Clattenburg (England)
24 February 2011
21:05

Villarreal (Spain)	2–1	(Italy) Napoli
Nilmar 43'; Rossi 45+1'	Report	Hamšík 18'

El Madrigal, Villarreal
Attendance: 21,061
Referee: Cüneyt Çakır (Turkey)

Villarreal won 2–1 on aggregate.

17 February 2011
21:05

Rangers (Scotland)	1–1	(Portugal) Sporting CP
Whittaker 66'	Report	Fernández 89'

Ibrox Stadium, Glasgow
Attendance: 34,095
Referee: Manuel Gräfe (Germany)
24 February 2011
19:00

Sporting CP (Portugal)	2–2	(Scotland) Rangers
Mendes 42'; Djaló 83'	Report	Diouf 19'; Edu 90+2'

Estádio José Alvalade, Lisbon
Attendance: 15,375
Referee: Paolo Tagliavento (Italy)

3–3 on aggregate; Rangers won on away goals.

17 February 2011
21:05

Sparta Prague (Czech Republic)	0–0	(England) Liverpool
	Report

Generali Arena, Prague
Attendance: 17,569
Referee: Florian Meyer (Germany)
24 February 2011
19:00

Liverpool (England)	1–0	(Czech Republic) Sparta Prague
Kuyt 86'	Report

Anfield, Liverpool
Attendance: 42,949
Referee: Milorad Mažić (Serbia)

Liverpool won 1–0 on aggregate.

17 February 2011
19:00

Anderlecht (Belgium)	0–3	(Netherlands) Ajax
	Report	Alderweireld 32'; Eriksen 59'; El Hamdaoui 67'

Constant Vanden Stock Stadium, Brussels
Attendance: 21,195
Referee: Gianluca Rocchi (Italy)
24 February 2011
21:05

Ajax (Netherlands)	2–0	(Belgium) Anderlecht
Sulejmani 11', 17'	Report

Amsterdam Arena, Amsterdam
Attendance: 42,591
Referee: Martin Hansson (Sweden)

Ajax won 5–0 on aggregate.

17 February 2011
19:00

Lech Poznań (Poland)	1–0	(Portugal) Braga
Rudņevs 72'	Report

Stadion Miejski, Poznań
Attendance: 29,133 (Note: UEFA has limited capacity at Stadion Miejski in UEFA Europa League matches for security reasons.)
Referee: Vladislav Bezborodov (Russia)
24 February 2011
21:05

Braga (Portugal)	2–0	(Poland) Lech Poznań
Alan 8'; Lima 36'	Report

Estádio Municipal, Braga
Attendance: 10,007
Referee: Markus Strömbergsson (Sweden)

Braga won 2–1 on aggregate.

17 February 2011
19:00

Beşiktaş (Turkey)	1–4	(Ukraine) Dynamo Kyiv
Quaresma 37'	Report	Vukojević 26'; Shevchenko 50'; Yussuf 56'; Husyev 90' (pen.)

BJK İnönü Stadium, Istanbul
Attendance: 21,809
Referee: Pedro Proença (Portugal)
24 February 2011
21:05

Dynamo Kyiv (Ukraine)	4–0	(Turkey) Beşiktaş
Vukojević 3'; Yarmolenko 55'; Husyev 64'; Shevchenko 74'	Report

Lobanovsky Dynamo Stadium, Kyiv
Attendance: 15,300
Referee: Tony Chapron (France)

Dynamo Kyiv won 8–1 on aggregate.

17 February 2011
21:05

Basel (Switzerland)	2–3	(Russia) Spartak Moscow
Frei 36'; Streller 41'	Report	D. Kombarov 61'; Dzyuba 70'; Ananidze 90+2'

St. Jakob-Park, Basel
Attendance: 13,073
Referee: Aleksandar Stavrev (Macedonia)
24 February 2011
19:00

Spartak Moscow (Russia)	1–1	(Switzerland) Basel
McGeady 90+1'	Report	Chipperfield 15'

Luzhniki Stadium, Moscow
Attendance: 14,977
Referee: Cristian Balaj (Romania)

Spartak Moscow won 4–3 on aggregate.

17 February 2011
21:05

Young Boys (Switzerland)	2–1	(Russia) Zenit Saint Petersburg
Lulić 46'; Mayuka 90+3'	Report	Lombaerts 20'

Stade de Suisse, Bern
Attendance: 15,026
Referee: Anastassios Kakos (Greece)
24 February 2011
17:00

Zenit Saint Petersburg (Russia)	3–1	(Switzerland) Young Boys
Lazović 41'; Semak 52'; Shirokov 76'	Report	Jemal 21'

Petrovsky Stadium, Saint Petersburg
Attendance: 15,000
Referee: Kristinn Jakobsson (Iceland)

Zenit Saint Petersburg won 4–3 on aggregate.

15 February 2011
18:00

Aris (Greece)	0–0	(England) Manchester City
	Report

Kleanthis Vikelidis Stadium, Thessaloniki
Attendance: 18,812
Referee: Alberto Undiano Mallenco (Spain)
24 February 2011
21:05

Manchester City (England)	3–0	(Greece) Aris
Džeko 7', 12'; Y. Touré 75'	Report

City of Manchester Stadium, Manchester
Attendance: 36,748
Referee: Pavel Královec (Czech Republic)

Manchester City won 3–0 on aggregate.

17 February 2011
21:05

PAOK (Greece)	0–1	(Russia) CSKA Moscow
	Report	Necid 29'

Toumba Stadium, Thessaloniki
Attendance: 22,245
Referee: Andre Marriner (England)
22 February 2011
18:00

CSKA Moscow (Russia)	1–1	(Greece) PAOK
Ignashevich 80'	Report	Muslimović 67'

Luzhniki Stadium, Moscow
Attendance: 10,500
Referee: Laurent Duhamel (France)

CSKA Moscow won 2–1 on aggregate.

17 February 2011
21:05

Sevilla (Spain)	1–2	(Portugal) Porto
Kanouté 65'	Report	Rolando 58'; Guarín 86'

Ramón Sánchez Pizjuán, Seville
Attendance: 21,555
Referee: Craig Thomson (Scotland)
23 February 2011
18:00

Porto (Portugal)	0–1	(Spain) Sevilla
	Report	Luís Fabiano 71'

Estádio do Dragão, Porto
Attendance: 35,609
Referee: Howard Webb (England)

2–2 on aggregate; Porto won on away goals.

17 February 2011
13:00 (Note: Played in Moscow at Luzhniki Stadium as there was severe cold in Kazan and Rubin Kazan's Central Stadium had a probable frozen pitch. Kickoff also moved to 13:00 (15:00 UTC+3) due to cold weather.)

Rubin Kazan (Russia)	0–2	(Netherlands) Twente
	Report	De Jong 77'; Wisgerhof 88'

Luzhniki Stadium, Moscow
Attendance: 657
Referee: Robert Schörgenhofer (Austria)
24 February 2011
21:05

Twente (Netherlands)	2–2	(Russia) Rubin Kazan
Janssen 45+1'; Douglas 47'	Report	Ansaldi 22'; Noboa 24'

De Grolsch Veste, Enschede
Attendance: 23,000
Referee: Marcin Borski (Poland)

Twente won 4–2 on aggregate.

17 February 2011
21:05

Lille (France)	2–2	(Netherlands) PSV Eindhoven
Gueye 6'; De Melo 31'	Report	Bouma 83'; Toivonen 84'

Stadium Nord Lille Métropole, Villeneuve-d'Ascq
Attendance: 16,951
Referee: Alexandru Dan Tudor (Romania)
24 February 2011
19:00

PSV Eindhoven (Netherlands)	3–1	(France) Lille
Dzsudzsák 55'; Lens 67'; Marcelo 73'	Report	Frau 22'

Philips Stadion, Eindhoven
Attendance: 28,000
Referee: Eduardo Iturralde González (Spain)

PSV Eindhoven won 5–3 on aggregate.

17 February 2011
19:00

Benfica (Portugal)	2–1	(Germany) VfB Stuttgart
Cardozo 70'; Jara 81'	Report	Harnik 21'

Estádio da Luz, Lisbon
Attendance: 44,852
Referee: Eric Braamhaar (Netherlands)
24 February 2011
21:05

VfB Stuttgart (Germany)	0–2	(Portugal) Benfica
	Report	Salvio 31'; Cardozo 78'

Mercedes-Benz Arena, Stuttgart
Attendance: 25,800
Referee: Mike Dean (England)

Benfica won 4–1 on aggregate.

17 February 2011
19:00

BATE Borisov (Belarus)	2–2	(France) Paris Saint-Germain
Bressan 16'; Gordeichuk 80'	Report	Erdinç 29'; Luyindula 89'

Dinamo Stadium, Minsk (Note: BATE Borisov played their knockout phase matches in Minsk at Dinamo Stadium as BATE Borisov's Haradski Stadium did not meet UEFA criteria.)
Attendance: 6,080
Referee: Alon Yefet (Israel)
24 February 2011
21:05

Paris Saint-Germain (France)	0–0	(Belarus) BATE Borisov
	Report

Parc des Princes, Paris
Attendance: 17,717
Referee: Kevin Blom (Netherlands)

2–2 on aggregate; Paris Saint-Germain won on away goals.

17 February 2011
17:00 (Note: Kickoff moved to 17:00 (18:00 UTC+2) due to cold weather.)

Metalist Kharkiv (Ukraine)	0–4	(Germany) Bayer Leverkusen
	Report	Derdiyok 23'; Castro 72'; Sam 90', 90+2'

Metalist Stadium, Kharkiv
Attendance: 35,150
Referee: Serge Gumienny (Belgium)
24 February 2011
19:00

Bayer Leverkusen (Germany)	2–0	(Ukraine) Metalist Kharkiv
Rolfes 47'; Ballack 70'	Report

BayArena, Leverkusen
Attendance: 16,212
Referee: William Collum (Scotland)

Bayer Leverkusen won 6–0 on aggregate.

== Round of 16 ==
=== Summary ===
The first legs were played on 10 March, and the second legs were played on 17 March 2011.

Team 1	Agg.	Team 2	1st leg	2nd leg
Benfica (Portugal)	3–2	(France) Paris Saint-Germain	2–1	1–1
Dynamo Kyiv (Ukraine)	2–1	(England) Manchester City	2–0	0–1
Twente (Netherlands)	3–2	(Russia) Zenit Saint Petersburg	3–0	0–2
CSKA Moscow (Russia)	1–3	(Portugal) Porto	0–1	1–2
PSV Eindhoven (Netherlands)	1–0	(Scotland) Rangers	0–0	1–0
Bayer Leverkusen (Germany)	3–5	(Spain) Villarreal	2–3	1–2
Ajax (Netherlands)	0–4	(Russia) Spartak Moscow	0–1	0–3
Braga (Portugal)	1–0 (Note: Order of legs reversed after original draw due to proximity between the cities of Porto and Braga.)	(England) Liverpool	1–0	0–0

=== Matches ===
10 March 2011
21:05

Benfica (Portugal)	2–1	(France) Paris Saint-Germain
Pereira 42'; Jara 81'	Report	Luyindula 14'

Estádio da Luz, Lisbon
Attendance: 33,928
Referee: Pavel Královec (Czech Republic)
17 March 2011
19:00

Paris Saint-Germain (France)	1–1	(Portugal) Benfica
Bodmer 35'	Report	Gaitán 27'

Parc des Princes, Paris
Attendance: 40,193
Referee: William Collum (Scotland)

Benfica won 3–2 on aggregate.

10 March 2011
21:05

Dynamo Kyiv (Ukraine)	2–0	(England) Manchester City
Shevchenko 25'; Husyev 77'	Report

Lobanovsky Dynamo Stadium, Kyiv
Attendance: 16,315
Referee: Florian Meyer (Germany)
17 March 2011
19:00

Manchester City (England)	1–0	(Ukraine) Dynamo Kyiv
Kolarov 39'	Report

City of Manchester Stadium, Manchester
Attendance: 27,816
Referee: Cüneyt Çakır (Turkey)

Dynamo Kyiv won 2–1 on aggregate.

10 March 2011
21:05

Twente (Netherlands)	3–0	(Russia) Zenit Saint Petersburg
De Jong 25', 90+2'; Landzaat 56'	Report

De Grolsch Veste, Enschede
Attendance: 20,750
Referee: Mark Clattenburg (England)
17 March 2011
19:00

Zenit Saint Petersburg (Russia)	2–0	(Netherlands) Twente
Shirokov 16'; Kerzhakov 38'	Report

Petrovsky Stadium, Saint Petersburg
Attendance: 18,000
Referee: Jonas Eriksson (Sweden)

Twente won 3–2 on aggregate.

10 March 2011
19:00

CSKA Moscow (Russia)	0–1	(Portugal) Porto
	Report	Guarín 70'

Luzhniki Stadium, Moscow
Attendance: 20,000
Referee: Robert Schörgenhofer (Austria)
17 March 2011
21:05

Porto (Portugal)	2–1	(Russia) CSKA Moscow
Hulk 1'; Guarín 24'	Report	Tošić 29'

Estádio do Dragão, Porto
Attendance: 32,712
Referee: Kevin Blom (Netherlands)

Porto won 3–1 on aggregate.

10 March 2011
19:00

PSV Eindhoven (Netherlands)	0–0	(Scotland) Rangers
	Report

Philips Stadion, Eindhoven
Attendance: 26,000
Referee: Martin Hansson (Sweden)
17 March 2011
21:05

Rangers (Scotland)	0–1	(Netherlands) PSV Eindhoven
	Report	Lens 14'

Ibrox Stadium, Glasgow
Attendance: 35,373
Referee: Robert Schörgenhofer (Austria)

PSV Eindhoven won 1–0 on aggregate.

10 March 2011
19:00

Bayer Leverkusen (Germany)	2–3	(Spain) Villarreal
Kadlec 33'; Castro 72'	Report	Rossi 42'; Nilmar 70', 90+4'

BayArena, Leverkusen
Attendance: 20,126
Referee: Paolo Tagliavento (Italy)
17 March 2011
21:05

Villarreal (Spain)	2–1	(Germany) Bayer Leverkusen
Cazorla 33'; Rossi 61'	Report	Derdiyok 82'

El Madrigal, Villarreal
Attendance: 19,779
Referee: Björn Kuipers (Netherlands)

Villarreal won 5–3 on aggregate.

10 March 2011
21:05

Ajax (Netherlands)	0–1	(Russia) Spartak Moscow
	Report	Alex 57'

Amsterdam Arena, Amsterdam
Attendance: 32,841
Referee: Manuel Gräfe (Germany)
17 March 2011
19:00

Spartak Moscow (Russia)	3–0	(Netherlands) Ajax
D. Kombarov 21'; Welliton 30'; Alex 54'	Report

Luzhniki Stadium, Moscow
Attendance: 33,631
Referee: Martin Atkinson (England)

Spartak Moscow won 4–0 on aggregate.

10 March 2011
19:00

Braga (Portugal)	1–0	(England) Liverpool
Alan 18' (pen.)	Report

Estádio Municipal, Braga
Attendance: 12,991
Referee: Serge Gumienny (Belgium)
17 March 2011
21:05

Liverpool (England)	0–0	(Portugal) Braga
	Report

Anfield, Liverpool
Attendance: 37,494
Referee: Gianluca Rocchi (Italy)

Braga won 1–0 on aggregate.

== Quarter-finals ==
=== Summary ===
The first legs were played on 7 April, and the second legs were played on 14 April 2011.

Team 1	Agg.	Team 2	1st leg	2nd leg
Porto (Portugal)	10–3	(Russia) Spartak Moscow	5–1	5–2
Benfica (Portugal)	6–3	(Netherlands) PSV Eindhoven	4–1	2–2
Villarreal (Spain)	8–2	(Netherlands) Twente	5–1	3–1
Dynamo Kyiv (Ukraine)	1–1 (a) (Note: Order of legs reversed after original draw due to proximity between the cities of Porto and Braga.)	(Portugal) Braga	1–1	0–0

=== Matches ===
7 April 2011
21:05

Porto (Portugal)	5–1	(Russia) Spartak Moscow
Falcao 37', 84', 90+2'; Varela 65'; D. Kombarov 70' (o.g.)	Report	K. Kombarov 71'

Estádio do Dragão, Porto
Attendance: 38,209
Referee: Serge Gumienny (Belgium)
14 April 2011
19:00

Spartak Moscow (Russia)	2–5	(Portugal) Porto
Dzyuba 52'; Ari 72'	Report	Hulk 28'; C. Rodríguez 45+2'; Guarín 47'; Falcao 54'; Micael 89'

Luzhniki Stadium, Moscow
Attendance: 17,088
Referee: Viktor Kassai (Hungary)

Porto won 10–3 on aggregate.

7 April 2011
21:05

Benfica (Portugal)	4–1	(Netherlands) PSV Eindhoven
Aimar 37'; Salvio 45', 52'; Saviola 90+4'	Report	Labyad 80'

Estádio da Luz, Lisbon
Attendance: 60,026
Referee: Paolo Tagliavento (Italy)
14 April 2011
21:05

PSV Eindhoven (Netherlands)	2–2	(Portugal) Benfica
Dzsudzsák 17'; Lens 25'	Report	Luisão 45+2'; Cardozo 63' (pen.)

Philips Stadion, Eindhoven
Attendance: 29,500
Referee: Wolfgang Stark (Germany)

Benfica won 6–3 on aggregate.

7 April 2011
21:05

Villarreal (Spain)	5–1	(Netherlands) Twente
Marchena 23'; Valero 43'; Nilmar 45+1', 81'; Rossi 55'	Report	Janko 90+1'

El Madrigal, Villarreal
Attendance: 19,094
Referee: Aleksei Nikolaev (Russia)
14 April 2011
21:05

Twente (Netherlands)	1–3	(Spain) Villarreal
Bajrami 32'	Report	Rossi 60' (pen.); Ruben 84' (pen.); Cani 90'

De Grolsch Veste, Enschede
Attendance: 23,500
Referee: William Collum (Scotland)

Villarreal won 8–2 on aggregate.

7 April 2011
21:05

Dynamo Kyiv (Ukraine)	1–1	(Portugal) Braga
Yarmolenko 6'	Report	Husyev 13' (o.g.)

Lobanovsky Dynamo Stadium, Kyiv
Attendance: 16,115
Referee: Björn Kuipers (Netherlands)
14 April 2011
21:05

Braga (Portugal)	0–0	(Ukraine) Dynamo Kyiv
	Report

Estádio Municipal, Braga
Attendance: 14,839
Referee: Jonas Eriksson (Sweden)

1–1 on aggregate; Braga won on away goals.

== Semi-finals ==
=== Summary ===
The first legs were played on 28 April, and the second legs were played on 5 May 2011.

Team 1	Agg.	Team 2	1st leg	2nd leg
Benfica (Portugal)	2–2 (a) (Note: Order of legs reversed after original draw due to proximity between the cities of Porto and Braga.)	(Portugal) Braga	2–1	0–1
Porto (Portugal)	7–4	(Spain) Villarreal	5–1	2–3

=== Matches ===
28 April 2011
21:05

Benfica (Portugal)	2–1	(Portugal) Braga
Jardel 50'; Cardozo 59'	Report	Vandinho 53'

Estádio da Luz, Lisbon
Attendance: 57,778
Referee: Craig Thomson (Scotland)
5 May 2011
21:05

Braga (Portugal)	1–0	(Portugal) Benfica
Custódio 19'	Report

Estádio Municipal, Braga
Attendance: 25,384
Referee: Martin Atkinson (England)

2–2 on aggregate; Braga won on away goals.

28 April 2011
21:05

Porto (Portugal)	5–1	(Spain) Villarreal
Falcao 49' (pen.), 67', 75', 90'; Guarín 61'	Report	Cani 45'

Estádio do Dragão, Porto
Attendance: 44,719
Referee: Björn Kuipers (Netherlands)
5 May 2011
21:05

Villarreal (Spain)	3–2	(Portugal) Porto
Cani 17'; Capdevila 75'; Rossi 80' (pen.)	Report	Musacchio 39' (o.g.); Falcao 48'

El Madrigal, Villarreal
Attendance: 18,523
Referee: Gianluca Rocchi (Italy)

Porto won 7–4 on aggregate.

== Final ==
The 2011 UEFA Europa League final was played on 18 May 2011 at Aviva Stadium in Dublin, Ireland. Due to UEFA rules against corporate sponsorship outside the federation, for the final the stadium was referred to as the "Dublin Arena".

18 May 2011
20:45 (19:45 UTC+1)

Porto (Portugal)	1–0	(Portugal) Braga
Falcao 44'	Report

Aviva Stadium, Dublin
Attendance: 45,391
Referee: Carlos Velasco Carballo (Spain)
