= 2011 UEFA Europa League final =

- Match programme cover
- Event: 2010–11 UEFA Europa League
Porto	Braga
(Portugal)	(Portugal)
1	0
- Date: 18 May 2011
- Venue: Aviva Stadium, Dublin
- Man of the Match: Radamel Falcao (Porto)
- Referee: Carlos Velasco Carballo (Spain)
- Attendance: 45,391
- Weather: Cloudy; 13 °C (55 °F); 54% humidity

The 2011 UEFA Europa League final was the final match of the 2010–11 UEFA Europa League, the 40th season of Europe's secondary club football tournament organised by UEFA, and the second season since it was renamed from UEFA Cup to UEFA Europa League. The match was played at the Aviva Stadium in Dublin, Ireland, on 18 May 2011, between two Portuguese teams – Porto and Braga – for the first time in UEFA competition finals.

Porto won 1–0 and secured their second title in the competition, following a successful appearance in the 2003 UEFA Cup Final. The man of the match was Colombian striker Radamel Falcao, who scored the winning goal and further cemented his 2010–11 UEFA Europa League top scorer tally with a tournament record of 17 goals.

As the winners, Porto earned the right to play against the 2010–11 UEFA Champions League winners, Barcelona, in the 2011 UEFA Super Cup.

== Background ==
The qualification of Porto and Braga for the 2011 UEFA Europa League Final ensured it would be the first all-Portuguese final in UEFA competitions, and only the second European tie between Portuguese teams, after the semi-final meeting between Braga and Benfica. Overall, it was the eighth UEFA Cup or UEFA Europa League final featuring two clubs from the same national association. A distance of 47.4 km (29.5 mi) separated the cities of Porto and Braga, the smallest between opponents in a UEFA competition final. The previous record was 83.8 km (52.1 mi), set at the 1988 European Super Cup between PSV Eindhoven of the Netherlands and KV Mechelen of Belgium.

Porto secured its presence in a major UEFA competition final for the fifth time, after victorious campaigns at the 1986–87 European Cup (2–1 against Bayern Munich), 2002–03 UEFA Cup (3–2 against Celtic) and 2003–04 UEFA Champions League (3–0 against Monaco), and a runner-up place in the 1984 European Cup Winners' Cup final (lost 2–1 against Juventus). The club also competed three times in the UEFA Super Cup – won in 1987 (2–0 in aggregate, against Ajax) and lost in 2003 (1–0 against Milan) and 2004 (2–1 against Valencia) – and grabbed two Intercontinental Cup titles in 1987 (1–0 against Peñarol of Uruguay) and 2004 (0–0, 8–7 on penalties, against Once Caldas of Colombia).

Braga qualified for a UEFA competition final for the first time. Before reaching the Dublin final, the club's best European result was a place in the last 16 of the 2006–07 and 2008–09 UEFA Cup seasons. Participation in the 2008–09 UEFA Cup was achieved via the 2008 UEFA Intertoto Cup, where Braga was one of the eleven third-round winners. Having reached the furthest in the UEFA Cup, among the Intertoto Cup teams, Braga were considered the outright winners of the final season of this competition. In contrast to the extended national and international curriculum of Porto, Braga had just one major title in their history: the 1966 Portuguese Cup.

A UEFA Champions League regular, Porto finished third in the 2009–10 Primeira Liga and thus missed a place in the 2010–11 UEFA Champions League, entering instead in the UEFA Europa League play-off round. This was the first time Porto competed in UEFA's second competition since winning the 2002–03 tournament. Braga, on the other hand, finished the Portuguese league in a historic second place, which granted them participation in the UEFA Champions League for the first time. Braga reached the group stage by successively knocking out high-profile opponents, such as Celtic and Sevilla, in the second and third qualifying rounds, respectively. The club concluded the group stage in third place, behind Shakhtar Donetsk and Arsenal, and was relegated into the UEFA Europa League round of 32.

== Venue ==
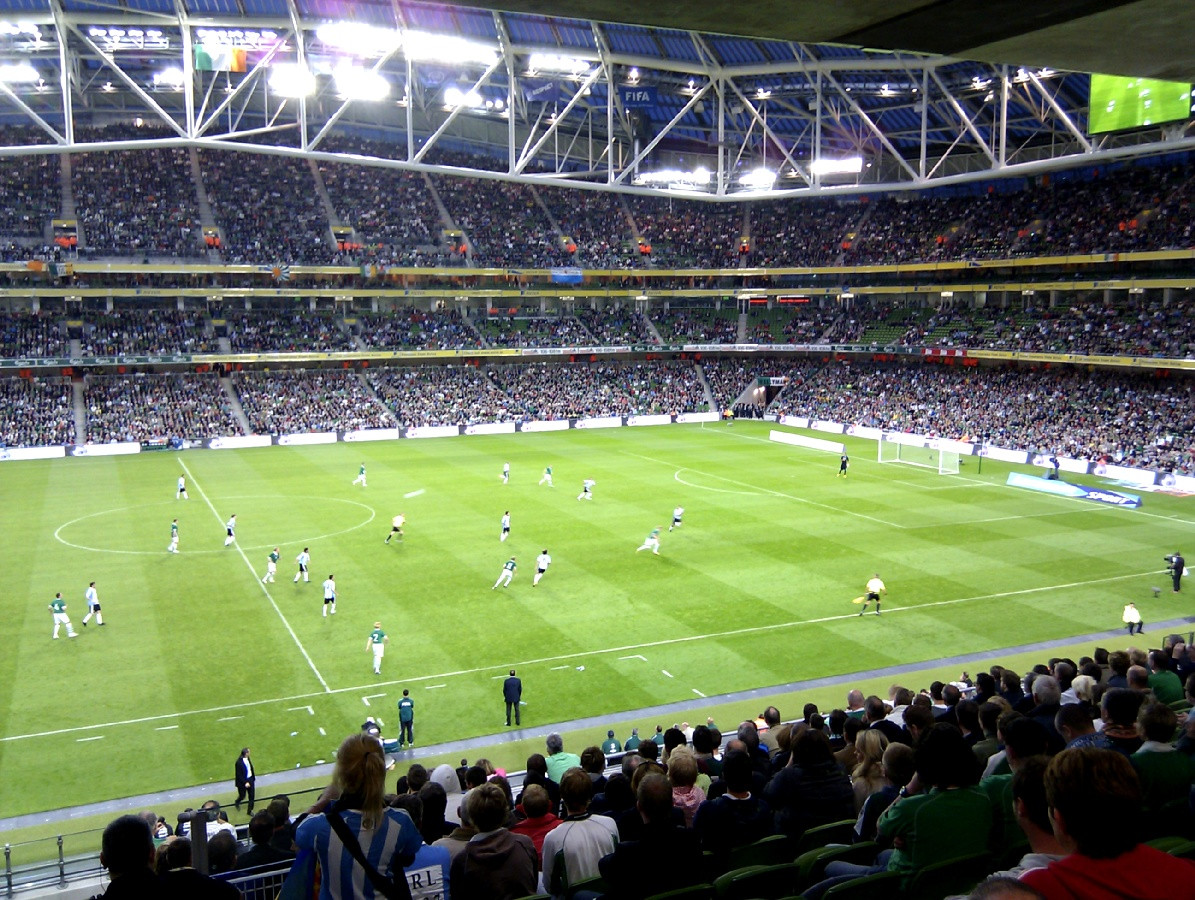
Aviva Stadium was renamed to "Dublin Arena" for the match

The Aviva Stadium in Dublin, Ireland, was selected to host the final match of the 2011 UEFA Europa League, at a meeting of the UEFA Executive Committee, on 29 January 2009. A bid from the then under-construction Irish venue was put forward by the Football Association of Ireland (FAI) and the Dublin City Council. It had competition from Arsenal's Emirates Stadium, but as Wembley Stadium was picked to host the Champions League final, Arsenal's bid was ruled out on the grounds that UEFA does not allow the same country to host its two major competition finals in the same season. This selection confirmed that Ireland would host its first-ever European football club competition final.

The new 50,000 all-seater stadium was built on the site of the old Lansdowne Road ground, with the intention of continuing the location as the home of the Irish national rugby and football teams. Demolition work began in late May 2007 and lasted two months. Erection of the infrastructure initiated in January 2009, and by October, the roof was fully installed; in the following month, construction of the pitch took place. The stadium was completed and handed over in April 2010 to the FAI and Irish Rugby Football Union (IRFU). It was officially opened on 14 May 2010, and on 11 August 2010 hosted its first international football match, between the Republic of Ireland and Argentina.

On 12 February 2009, the naming rights for the new stadium were bought by the British multi-national insurance company Aviva, for a ten-year period. However, because UEFA sponsorship regulations forbid advertising of brands outside of the organisation during competition matches, the venue would be referred as "Dublin Arena" during the final. Venue preparations for the final included the removal of every advertising and stadium branding elements unrelated with UEFA and its official sponsor partners. Stadium director Martin Murphy explained that the whole process was a "big operation", through which they had to "cover the signs on the stadium facade itself" and that "the three tiers [would] have Uefa [sic] branding across them, covering any existing sponsors." It also involved an increase in the number of media facilities and seats.

== Route to the final ==
(Portugal) Porto				Round	(Portugal) Braga			
Europa League					Champions League			
Opponent	Agg.	1st leg	2nd leg	Qualifying phase (EL, CL)	Opponent	Agg.	1st leg	2nd leg
Bye				Third qualifying round	(Scotland) Celtic	4–2	3–0 (H)	1–2 (A)
(Belgium) Genk	7–2	3–0 (A)	4–2 (H)	Play-off round	(Spain) Sevilla	5–3	1–0 (H)	4–3 (A)
Opponent	Result			Group stage (EL, CL)	Opponent	Result		
(Austria) Rapid Wien	3–0 (H)			Matchday 1	(England) Arsenal	0–6 (A)		
(Bulgaria) CSKA Sofia	1–0 (A)			Matchday 2	(Ukraine) Shakhtar Donetsk	0–3 (H)		
(Turkey) Beşiktaş	3–1 (A)			Matchday 3	(Serbia) Partizan	2–0 (H)		
(Turkey) Beşiktaş	1–1 (H)			Matchday 4	(Serbia) Partizan	1–0 (A)		
(Austria) Rapid Wien	3–1 (A)			Matchday 5	(England) Arsenal	2–0 (H)		
(Bulgaria) CSKA Sofia	3–1 (H)			Matchday 6	(Ukraine) Shakhtar Donetsk	0–2 (A)		
Group L winners: Pos / Team / Pld / Pts; 1 / (Portugal) Porto / 6 / 16; 2 / (Turkey) Beşiktaş / 6 / 13; 3 / (Austria) Rapid Wien / 6 / 3; 4 / (Bulgaria) CSKA Sofia / 6 / 3; Source: Soccerway				Final standings	Group H third place: Pos / Team / Pld / Pts; 1 / (Ukraine) Shakhtar Donetsk / 6 / 15; 2 / (England) Arsenal / 6 / 12; 3 / (Portugal) Braga / 6 / 9; 4 / (Serbia) Partizan / 6 / 0; Source: Soccerway			
Group L winners: Pos / Team / Pld / Pts; 1 / (Portugal) Porto / 6 / 16; 2 / (Turkey) Beşiktaş / 6 / 13; 3 / (Austria) Rapid Wien / 6 / 3; 4 / (Bulgaria) CSKA Sofia / 6 / 3; Source: Soccerway					Europa League			
Opponent	Agg.	1st leg	2nd leg	Knockout phase	Opponent	Agg.	1st leg	2nd leg
(Spain) Sevilla	2–2 (a)	2–1 (A)	0–1 (H)	Round of 32	(Poland) Lech Poznań	2–1	0–1 (A)	2–0 (H)
(Russia) CSKA Moscow	3–1	1–0 (A)	2–1 (H)	Round of 16	(England) Liverpool	1–0	1–0 (H)	0–0 (A)
(Russia) Spartak Moscow	10–3	5–1 (H)	5–2 (A)	Quarter-finals	(Ukraine) Dynamo Kyiv	1–1 (a)	1–1 (A)	0–0 (H)
(Spain) Villarreal	7–4	5–1 (H)	2–3 (A)	Semi-finals	(Portugal) Benfica	2–2 (a)	1–2 (A)	1–0 (H)

== Pre-match ==
=== Identity ===
UEFA unveiled the visual identity of the 2011 UEFA Europa League final in a ceremony held on 30 November 2010 at Dublin's Convention Centre. Attending this event were delegates of the local civic authorities, the Irish government and the FAI. London-based brand agency Desigwerk was again awarded the task of conceiving the visual identity for a UEFA competition event, after the 2005 and 2007 UEFA Champions League finals and the UEFA Euro 2008. The Dublin Arena was depicted as the focal element of the logo design, as the stadium is "the ultimate destination for the fans on their journey", according to UEFA's head of club competitions, Michael Heselschwerdt. He further explained that the visual identity contained "very clear and specific mentions and visual references to Dublin, to the Celtic setting and history, and to the local visual iconography".

=== Ticketing ===
Due to security reasons, the 50,000-seat Dublin Arena had its capacity reduced to 47,000 for the UEFA Europa League final. Ticket sales for the general public were carried out in two phases. The first phase was open exclusively for Irish residents from 16 December 2010 to 13 January 2011. Applications were submitted online to UEFA and the FAI for a maximum of two tickets from one of the four available price categories. Validated requests were entered into a ballot to determine which applications would be allocated tickets; successful applicants were notified by 26 January and received the tickets by 25 April. FAI chief executive John Delaney revealed that 7,000 tickets were sold during this phase, from a total of 21,000 applications, and that an additional 3,000 tickets were already allocated to the FAI grassroots. On 21 February, a second phase was opened for the international public, and lasted until 21 March. First-phase procedures were also applied to the international ticket sales. Ticket ballot notifications were concluded by 31 March and tickets were delivered by 18 April.

Each finalist club was assigned 12,000 tickets, most of which from the lowest priced category. Porto requested their full share, which they sold to annual seat-owner club members, during an initial phase, and then to the remaining club membership. Braga did not make complete use of their portion, returning a part of their allotted tickets.

=== Ambassador ===
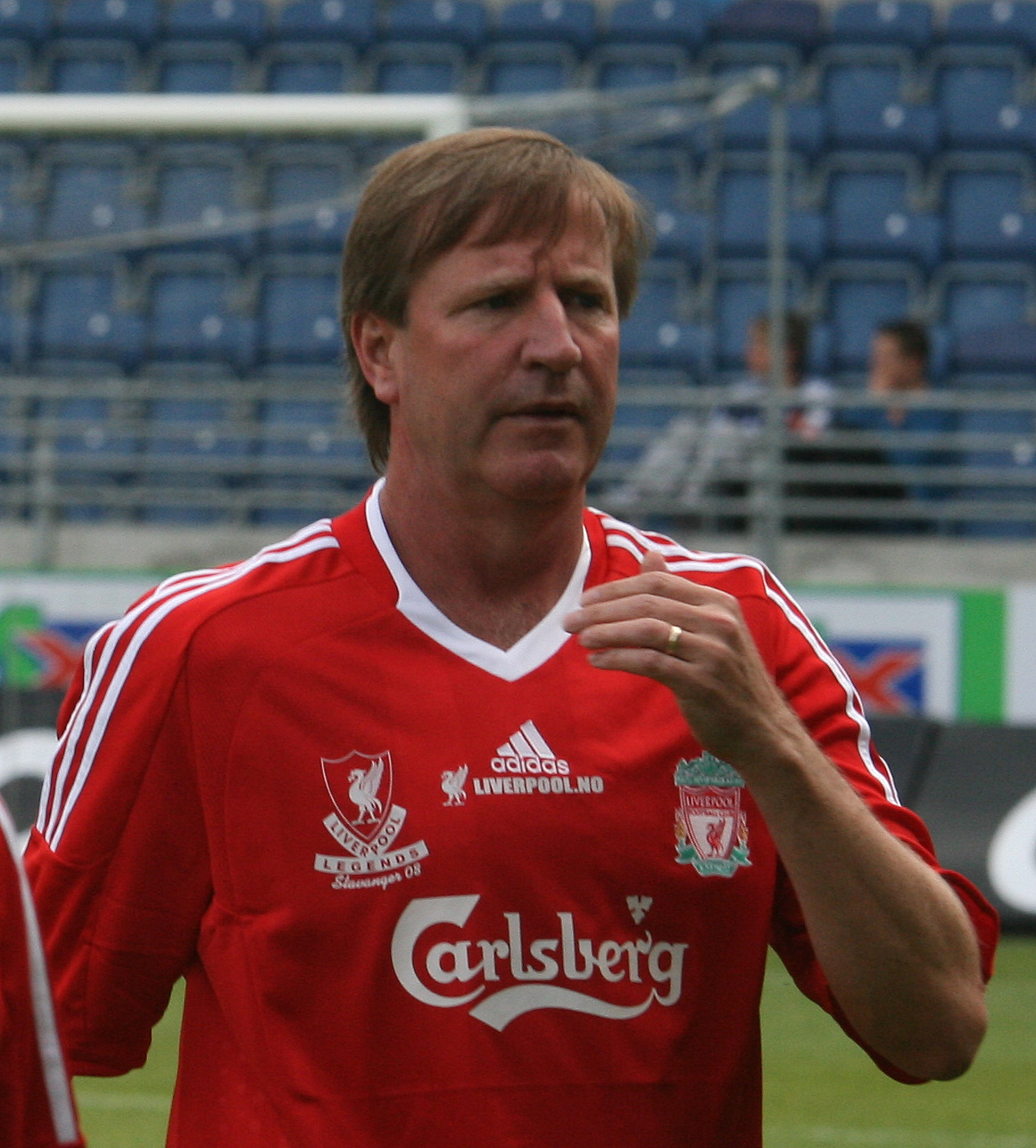
Ronnie Whelan, 2011 UEFA Europa League Final ambassador

Former Republic of Ireland and Liverpool midfielder Ronnie Whelan was presented by UEFA as the ambassador for the Dublin 2011 UEFA Europa League final, during the draw for the competition's group stage, held on 27 August 2010 at the Grimaldi Forum in Monaco. Arriving at the Merseyside club in 1979, Whelan became an important piece of the 1980s Liverpool team, winning six English titles, two FA Cups and three League Cups, as well as the 1984 European Cup. He helped the Republic of Ireland reach the 1988 UEFA European Football Championship, its first major international tournament; he was also in the squads that qualified Ireland to the 1990 and 1994 FIFA World Cups.

=== Related events ===
The UEFA Europa League trophy was handed over by UEFA to the city of Dublin, in a ceremony held on 19 April 2011, at the Royal Hospital Kilmainham. During the event that marked the one-month countdown to the 2011 UEFA Europa League final, UEFA president Michel Platini entrusted the cup to Gerry Breen, Lord Mayor of Dublin, so that it would go into public display throughout the Irish capital until the day of the final. Representatives from Atlético Madrid, the first Europa League winners – namely president Enrique Cerezo, managing director Clemente Villaverde, and defender Álvaro Dominguez. FAI chief executive John Delaney, and the final ambassador Ronnie Whelan were also in attendance. Upon accepting the trophy, Breen stated that "Irish football fans have travelled the world supporting the Republic of Ireland but this is the first time that an event like this has come to our shores and this will be a major occasion for the city".

A trophy tour was set up so that the general public could see closely the award in various sites of Dublin, such as the General Post Office, the Dublin City Hall, and the recently built airport terminal 2.

=== Officials ===
The refereeing team for the 2011 UEFA Europa League final was provided by the Royal Spanish Football Federation and led by referee Carlos Velasco Carballo. Velasco Carballo began refereeing in the Spanish Primera División in 2004, and in April 2005 he was selected as the fourth official for three matches in the elite round of the 2005 UEFA European Under-19 Football Championship. In 2008, he was promoted to the FIFA list of international referees and refereed his first international matches in the elite qualification round of the 2008 UEFA European Under-19 Championship. He took charge of his first UEFA Champions League qualifying match later that year, followed by another in the 2009–10 season, as well as six UEFA Europa League matches. In 2010–11, he refereed his first matches in the UEFA Champions League proper, including three group stage games and the first leg of the semi-final between Schalke 04 and Manchester United.

Velasco Carballo's refereeing team was all-Spanish: he was supported by assistant referees Roberto Alonso Fernández and Jesús Calvo Guadamuro on the touchlines, and Carlos Clos Gómez and Antonio Rubinos Pérez in the penalty areas, as well as fourth official David Fernández Borbolán and reserve assistant referee Juan Carlos Yuste Jiménez.

=== Team selection ===
Porto midfielder João Moutinho missed his team's final league match against Marítimo, following an injury in the previous game against Paços de Ferreira, but recovered in time to be included in André Villas-Boas's picks for the Europa League final. Brazilian players Hulk, Fernando, and goalkeeper Helton were also called by Villas-Boas after resting against Marítimo, in exchange for Polish keeper Paweł Kieszek and Argentine winger Mariano González, who were not inscribed in the Europa League. Among the players unfit to play in Dublin due to more serious injuries or physical restraints were the Uruguayans Jorge Fucile (broken collarbone) and Cristian Rodríguez, as well as Portuguese leftback Emídio Rafael (broken fibula).

Braga's manager Domingos Paciência had no major physical impediments among his players. Despite pre-selected for the league match against Sporting CP, defenders Miguel Garcia and Alberto Rodríguez, and striker Paulo César were deemed unfit to play and were left out by caution. They were reintegrated in the group that was to play in Dublin.

== Match ==
=== Summary ===
Coming into this final once again as underdogs, Braga quickly showed signs of their intent as Custódio missed an early chance to goal with a wide shot from the right side of the penalty area. In response, in the 7th minute, Hulk jinked three Braga defenders and sent the ball inches away from the top-left corner. Soon after, Braga transitioned into a more defensive strategy, holding much of Porto's attacks. The rest of the first half was characterised by few opportunities and excessive tackling, until the 44th minute, when Porto broke the deadlock. A loose pass from Alberto Rodriguez allowed Fredy Guarín to recover the ball on the midfield and execute a perfect deep cross for unmarked Radamel Falcao to conclude with a header into the top left corner, out of reach for Braga's keeper Artur Moraes. This was Falcao's 17th goal in the competition, which further cemented his already confirmed 2010–11 UEFA Europa League top scorer status, and contributed for his pick as man of the match.

Paciência introduced Kaká and Márcio Mossoró into the game, right after half-time, and it took no time for the latter to create Braga's best opportunity to level the score. Stealing the ball from an unaware Rolando, he raced towards Helton only to see his shot defended by the keeper's legs. Braga began pressing Porto and substitute Meyong had a chance for goal on the 77th minute, but his shot at the edge of the box ended in Helton's hands. Porto continued holding off Braga's attempts and created more danger in counter-attacks, but the score would not change until the final whistle.

=== Details ===
18 May 2011
19:45 UTC+1

Porto (Portugal)	1–0	(Portugal) Braga
Falcao 44'	Report

Aviva Stadium, Dublin
Attendance: 45,391
Referee: Carlos Velasco Carballo (Spain)

Porto	Braga

GK	1	(Brazil) Helton (c)	(yellow card) 90'
RB	21	(Romania) Cristian Săpunaru	(yellow card) 49'
CB	14	(Portugal) Rolando	(yellow card) 90+3'
CB	30	(Argentina) Nicolás Otamendi
LB	5	(Uruguay) Álvaro Pereira
DM	25	(Brazil) Fernando
CM	6	(Colombia) Fredy Guarín		(substituted off) 73'
CM	8	(Portugal) João Moutinho
RW	12	(Brazil) Hulk
LW	17	(Portugal) Silvestre Varela		(substituted off) 79'
CF	9	(Colombia) Radamel Falcao
Substitutes:
GK	24	(Portugal) Beto
DF	4	(Brazil) Maicon
MF	7	(Argentina) Fernando Belluschi		(substituted on) 73'
MF	23	(Brazil) Souza
MF	28	(Portugal) Rúben Micael
FW	18	(Brazil) Walter
FW	19	(Colombia) James Rodríguez		(substituted on) 79'
Manager:
(Portugal) André Villas-Boas

GK	1	(Brazil) Artur Moraes
RB	15	(Portugal) Miguel Garcia	(yellow card) 55'
CB	3	(Brazil) Paulão
CB	2	(Peru) Alberto Rodríguez		(substituted off) 46'
LB	28	(Portugal) Sílvio	(yellow card) 30'
CM	27	(Portugal) Custódio
CM	88	(Brazil) Vandinho (c)
AM	45	(Portugal) Hugo Viana	(yellow card) 24'	(substituted off) 46'
RW	30	(Brazil) Alan
LW	9	(Brazil) Paulo César
CF	18	(Brazil) Lima		(substituted off) 66'
Substitutes:
GK	42	(Portugal) Cristiano
DF	4	(Brazil) Kaká	(yellow card) 80'	(substituted on) 46'
DF	20	(Nigeria) Elderson Echiéjilé
MF	8	(Brazil) Márcio Mossoró	(yellow card) 59'	(substituted on) 46'
MF	25	(Brazil) Leandro Salino
FW	10	(Portugal) Hélder Barbosa
FW	19	(Cameroon) Albert Meyong		(substituted on) 66'
Manager:
(Portugal) Domingos Paciência

Man of the Match:
Radamel Falcao (Porto)

Assistant referees:
Roberto Alonso Fernández (Spain)
Jesús Calvo Guadamuro (Spain)
Fourth official:
David Fernández Borbalán (Spain)
Additional assistant referees:
Carlos Clos Gómez (Spain)
Antonio Rubinos Pérez (Spain)
Reserve assistant referee:
Juan Carlos Yuste Jiménez (Spain)

=== Statistics ===
First half
Statistic	Porto	Braga
Goals scored	1	0
Total shots	5	5
Shots on target	1	1
Saves	1	0
Ball possession	58%	42%
Corner kicks	3	0
Fouls committed	11	10
Offsides	3	1
Yellow cards	0	2
Red cards	0	0

Second half
Statistic	Porto	Braga
Goals scored	0	0
Total shots	3	4
Shots on target	0	2
Saves	2	0
Ball possession	50%	50%
Corner kicks	4	3
Fouls committed	12	9
Offsides	1	5
Yellow cards	3	3
Red cards	0	0

Overall
Statistic	Porto	Braga
Goals scored	1	0
Total shots	8	9
Shots on target	1	3
Saves	3	0
Ball possession	55%	45%
Corner kicks	7	3
Fouls committed	23	19
Offsides	4	6
Yellow cards	3	5
Red cards	0	0

== See also ==
- 2011 UEFA Champions League final
- 2011 UEFA Super Cup
- FC Porto in international football
- S.C. Braga in European football
- 2010–11 FC Porto season
- 2010–11 S.C. Braga season
