= Diego Silva =

Diego Silva may refer to:

- Diego Costa Silva (born 1979), Brazilian football goalkeeper
- Diego Pelicles da Silva (born 1982), Brazilian footballer
- Diego Silva (footballer, born 1983), Chilean football defender for Deportes Recoleta
- Diego da Silva (footballer born 1985), Brazilian former football forward
- Diego Silva (footballer, born 1987), Uruguayan football forward for See Khwae City
- Diego Martins da Silva (born 1989), Portuguese football goalkeeper
- Diego Silva (footballer, born 1989), Brazilian football defensive midfielder for Marcílio Dias
- Diego Silva (footballer, born 1990), Brazilian football forward
- Diego Silva (footballer, born 1993), Brazilian football centre-back
- Diego Silva (soccer, born 1997), American former soccer midfielder
