= S.C. Braga in European football =

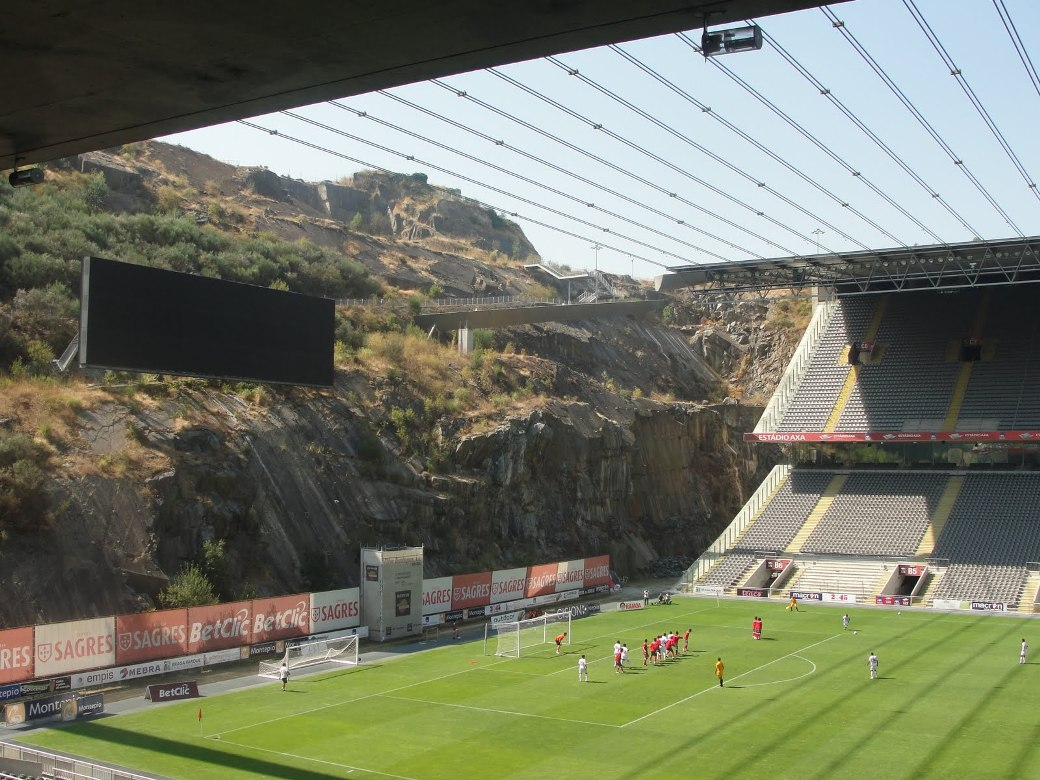
- Estádio Municipal de Braga
- Club: S.C. Braga
- Seasons played: 27
- First entry: 1966–67 European Cup Winners' Cup
- Latest entry: 2026–27 UEFA Conference League

Titles
- Intertoto Cup: 1 (2008)

S.C. Braga is a Portuguese football club based in the northern city of Braga. They have competed in European competitions organised by UEFA: the UEFA Cup Winners' Cup, UEFA Europa League (formerly UEFA Cup), UEFA Intertoto Cup, UEFA Champions League and UEFA Conference League.

Its first entry was in the 1966–67 European Cup Winners' Cup, reaching the second round. Since its entry into the 2004–05 UEFA Cup, Braga competed in European competition for ten seasons. It defeated Turkey's Sivasspor 5–0 on aggregate to win the 2008 UEFA Intertoto Cup, entered the Champions League for the first time in 2010–11, and that same season reached the Europa League final, losing 1–0 to compatriots Porto.

Portuguese forward Ricardo Horta is the club's highest appearance-maker and goalscorer in European football, with 29 goals in 98 matches.

== History ==
=== Early history ===
After winning the 1965–66 Taça de Portugal by defeating Vitória de Setúbal 1–0 in the final, Braga qualified for its first European competition, the 1966–67 European Cup Winners' Cup. Drawn against Greek team AEK Athens in the first round, Braga won 1–0 away in the first round and 3–2 at home in the second to advance 4–2 on aggregate. In the second round, they met Raba ETO Győr of Hungary, losing 3–0 away in the first leg and winning 2–0 at home in the second, to lose 3–2 on aggregate.

Twelve years later, Braga returned to European football by finishing fourth in the 1977–78 Primeira Divisão to qualify for the 1978–79 UEFA Cup. In the first round, they played Hibernians of Malta, winning the first leg 5–0 at the Estádio 1º de Maio on 13 September 1978, the team's record victory in Europe. They lost the second leg 3–2 but still advanced on aggregate. In the next round, Braga lost 3–0 on aggregate to England's West Bromwich Albion.

Braga lost 4–0 to Sporting CP in the final of the 1981–82 domestic cup, but as the opponents also won the league to qualify for the European Cup, Braga entered the 1982–83 European Cup Winners' Cup. They played the preliminary round against Swansea City of Wales, losing 3–0 in the first leg and winning the second leg 1–0 at home to no avail. Braga again came fourth in the 1983–84 Primeira Divisão to enter the 1984–85 UEFA Cup. In the first round, they met reigning champions Tottenham Hotspur of England, losing 9–0 on aggregate; the 6–0 loss in the second leg at White Hart Lane on 3 October 1984 is Braga's joint biggest European defeat.

After a further 13 years without entry in European competition, Braga came fourth in the 1996–97 Primeira Divisão to enter the 1997–98 UEFA Cup. They met Dutch team Vitesse in the first round, losing 2–1 away in the first leg; Mladen Karoglan got the crucial consolation in the last minute. Two goals from Artur Jorge won the second leg 2–0, putting Braga into the second round where they won 5–0 on aggregate against Dinamo Tbilisi. In the third round, the last 16, Braga held Germany's Schalke 04 to a goalless home draw in the first leg, then lost 2–0 in the second.

After losing 3–1 to Porto in the 1997–98 Taça de Portugal final, Braga entered the 1998–99 UEFA Cup Winners' Cup, the final running of the tournament. In the first round, they met Latvia's Liepājas Metalurgs, drawing 0–0 in the first leg away before a 4–0 second leg win. They then played Lokomotiv Moscow, losing 3–1 in the Russian capital; Karoglan scored the only goal of the home game but did not change the outcome.

Season	Competition	Round	Opponent	Home	Away	Agg.
1966–67	Cup Winners' Cup	R1	(Greece) AEK Athens	3–2	1–0	4–2
1966–67	Cup Winners' Cup	R2	(Hungary) Rába ETO Győr	2–0	0–3	2–3
1978–79	UEFA Cup	R1	(Malta) Hibernians	5–0	2–3	7–3
1978–79	UEFA Cup	R2	(England) West Bromwich Albion	0–2	0–1	0–3
1982–83	Cup Winners' Cup	PR	(Wales) Swansea City	1–0	0–3	1–3
1984–85	UEFA Cup	R1	(England) Tottenham Hotspur	0–3	0–6	0–9
1997–98	UEFA Cup	R1	(Netherlands) Vitesse	2–0	1–2	3–2
1997–98	UEFA Cup	R2	(Georgia (country)) Dinamo Tbilisi	4–0	1–0	5–0
1997–98	UEFA Cup	R3	(Germany) Schalke 04	0–0	0–2	0–2
1998–99	Cup Winners' Cup	R1	(Latvia) Liepājas Metalurgs	4–0	0–0	4–0
1998–99	Cup Winners' Cup	R2	(Russia) Lokomotiv Moscow	1–0	1–3	2–3

Note: Braga score always listed first.

=== Consistent entries ===
Braga came 5th in the 2003–04 Primeira Liga to qualify for the 2004–05 UEFA Cup, their first European competition for six years. They were drawn in the first round against Heart of Midlothian from Scotland. They lost the first leg 3–1 at Murrayfield Stadium, and drew 2–2 in the second leg at the Estádio Municipal de Braga to be eliminated. With a 4th-place domestic finish, Braga entered the next edition of the same competition and again fell at the first hurdle to Serbo-Montenegrin team Red Star Belgrade on the away goals rule.

After again finishing fourth, Braga entered the 2006–07 UEFA Cup, and defeated Italy's Chievo 3–2 on aggregate in the first round with an extra-time winner by Wender in Verona. The team came third of five in their group, defeating Slovan Liberec and Grasshopper while losing to AZ and Sevilla. In the round of 32, they defeated another Italian team Parma 1–0 in each leg. Braga then met Tottenham in the last 16, losing each leg 3–2 to be eliminated.

A third consecutive placement of fourth in the domestic league gave Braga a place in the 2007–08 UEFA Cup. Despite losing the first leg 2–1 in Sweden, they defeated Hammarby IF 5–1 on aggregate in the first round. Braga negotiated their group undefeated, drawing with Bolton Wanderers, Bayern Munich and Aris before a 2–0 home win over Red Star. In the last 32, they lost 4–0 on aggregate to Germany's Bayer Leverkusen.

Braga finished 7th in the 2007–08 Primeira Liga and therefore entered into the third round of the 2008 UEFA Intertoto Cup, where they defeated Turkish club Sivasspor 5–0 on aggregate to enter into the 2008–09 UEFA Cup. After wins over Zrinjski Mostar and Artmedia Petržalka, the team advanced from their group in third place after winning just one game, 3–0 at home to England's Portsmouth in the opener. After a 4–1 aggregate win over Standard Liège, the team was eliminated in the last 16 by Paris Saint-Germain through a late strike by substitute Guillaume Hoarau.

By coming 5th in the league, Braga entered the third qualifying round of the 2009–10 UEFA Europa League and lost 4–1 on aggregate to Elfsborg.

Season	Competition	Round	Opponent	Home	Away	Agg.
2004–05	UEFA Cup	R1	(Scotland) Heart of Midlothian	2–2	1–3	3–5
2005–06	UEFA Cup	R1	(Serbia and Montenegro) Red Star Belgrade	1–1	0–0	1–1 (a)
2006–07	UEFA Cup	R1	(Italy) Chievo	2–0	1–2 (aet)	3–2
2006–07	UEFA Cup	GS	(Netherlands) AZ	—N/a	0–3	3rd
2006–07	UEFA Cup	GS	(Czech Republic) Slovan Liberec	4–0	—N/a	3rd
2006–07	UEFA Cup	GS	(Spain) Sevilla	—N/a	0–2	3rd
2006–07	UEFA Cup	GS	(Switzerland) Grasshopper	2–0	—N/a	3rd
2006–07	UEFA Cup	R32	(Italy) Parma	1–0	1–0	2–0
2006–07	UEFA Cup	R16	(England) Tottenham Hotspur	2–3	2–3	4–6
2007–08	UEFA Cup	R1	(Sweden) Hammarby IF	4–0	1–2	5–2
2007–08	UEFA Cup	GS	(England) Bolton Wanderers	—N/a	1–1	2nd
2007–08	UEFA Cup	GS	(Germany) Bayern Munich	1–1	—N/a	2nd
2007–08	UEFA Cup	GS	(Greece) Aris	—N/a	1–1	2nd
2007–08	UEFA Cup	GS	(Serbia) Red Star Belgrade	2–0	—N/a	2nd
2007–08	UEFA Cup	R32	(Germany) Werder Bremen	0–1	0–3	0–4
2008	Intertoto Cup	R3	(Turkey) Sivasspor	3–0	2–0	5–0
2008–09	UEFA Cup	QR2	(Bosnia and Herzegovina) Zrinjski Mostar	1–0	2–0	3–0
2008–09	UEFA Cup	R1	(Slovakia) Artmedia Petržalka	4–0	2–0	6–0
2008–09	UEFA Cup	GS	(England) Portsmouth	3–0	—N/a	3rd
2008–09	UEFA Cup	GS	(Italy) Milan	—N/a	0–1	3rd
2008–09	UEFA Cup	GS	(Germany) Wolfsburg	2–3	—N/a	3rd
2008–09	UEFA Cup	GS	(Netherlands) Heerenveen	—N/a	2–1	3rd
2008–09	UEFA Cup	R32	(Belgium) Standard Liège	3–0	1–1	4–1
2008–09	UEFA Cup	R16	(France) Paris Saint-Germain	0–1	0–0	0–1
2009–10	UEFA Europa League	QR3	(Sweden) Elfsborg	1–2	0–2	1–4

Note: Braga score always listed first.

=== 2010–11: First Champions League appearance and Europa League final ===
Braga finished a best-ever second in the 2009–10 Primeira Liga, and so entered the 2010–11 UEFA Champions League, their first time in Europe's primary competition. They began in the third qualifying round against Celtic of Scotland, winning 3–0 in the home leg and losing 2–1 away. In the play-off, Matheus headed the only goal of the home game against Sevilla, and away at the Ramón Sánchez Pizjuán Stadium, Lima scored a hat-trick in a 4–3 win.

In the first game of the group stage on 15 September 2010, Braga lost 6–0 to Arsenal, from whom they got their "Arsenalistas" nickname, at the Emirates Stadium, equalling their worst European result. After a 3–0 home loss to Shakhtar Donetsk they won both games against Serbia's Partizan, and then Matheus struck two late goals in a home win over Arsenal. However, a 2–0 away loss to Shakhtar meant that Braga came 3rd in their group and dropped into the Europa League.

After a 2–1 aggregate win over Poland's Lech Poznań, Braga faced Liverpool in the last 16, winning 1–0 with an early penalty from Alan after Sotirios Kyrgiakos brought down Mossoró. In the quarter-finals, they conceded from Dynamo Kyiv's Andriy Yarmolenko after six minutes, but seven minutes later Oleh Husyev's own goal gave them an away-goals victory.

In an all-Portuguese semi-final against Benfica, Braga lost the first leg 2–1 at the Estádio da Luz via an Óscar Cardozo free kick. However, in the second leg, a first-half header by Custódio gave Braga the victory on away goals and put them into their first major final. In the 2011 UEFA Europa League final at Dublin's Aviva Stadium on 18 May 2011, Braga met fellow northerners Porto, losing 1–0 to a header by Radamel Falcao just before half time.

Season	Competition	Round	Opponent	Home	Away	Agg.
2010–11	UEFA Champions League	QR3	(Scotland) Celtic	3–0	1–2	4–2
2010–11	UEFA Champions League	PO	(Spain) Sevilla	1–0	4–3	5–3
2010–11	UEFA Champions League	GS	(England) Arsenal	2–0	0–6	3rd
2010–11	UEFA Champions League	GS	(Ukraine) Shakhtar Donetsk	0–3	0–2	3rd
2010–11	UEFA Champions League	GS	(Serbia) Partizan	2–0	1–0	3rd
2010–11	UEFA Europa League	R32	(Poland) Lech Poznań	2–0	0–1	2–1
2010–11	UEFA Europa League	R16	(England) Liverpool	1–0	0–0	1–0
2010–11	UEFA Europa League	QF	(Ukraine) Dynamo Kyiv	0–0	1–1	1–1 (a)
2010–11	UEFA Europa League	SF	(Portugal) Benfica	1–0	1–2	2–2 (a)
2010–11	UEFA Europa League	F	(Portugal) Porto	—N/a	—N/a	0–1

Note: Braga score always listed first.

=== Recent history ===
Another 4th-place finish qualified Braga for the 2011–12 UEFA Europa League, where in the play-off they met Switzerland's Young Boys, drawing the first leg 0–0 at home and the second 2–2 away to advance on away goals. They advanced through the group in second place with three wins and two draws, including a 5–1 home win over Maribor. In the last 32, they fell 2–1 on aggregate to Turkey's Beşiktaş, for whom the Portuguese winger Simão scored.

After finishing third in the domestic league, Braga returned to the 2012–13 UEFA Champions League, winning in a penalty shoot-out in the play-off at Italy's Udinese as Beto saved a Panenka-style attempt from Maicosuel. Braga came last in their group, losing all of their games apart from a 2–0 win over Galatasaray in Turkey.

Braga were eliminated from the play-off of the 2013–14 UEFA Europa League by Romania's Pandurii and missed out on European football the next season for the first time in a decade by finishing 9th in the domestic league. They returned to the 2015–16 UEFA Europa League by finishing 4th, earning a bye to the group stage, which they won with four victories from six games. In the last 32, they won 4–3 on aggregate against Swiss team Sion, with Nikola Stojiljković scoring in each leg. Against Turkey's Fenerbahçe in the last 16, Braga recovered from a 1–0 loss in the first leg to win 4–2 on aggregate. Their run ended in the quarter-finals against Shakhtar, losing the first leg 1–2 at home. In the second, they lost 0–4 away, with Ricardo Ferreira scoring two own goals.

Season	Competition	Round	Opponent	Home	Away	Agg.
2011–12	UEFA Europa League	PO	(Switzerland) Young Boys	0–0	2–2	2–2 (a)
2011–12	UEFA Europa League	GS	(England) Birmingham City	1–0	3–1	2nd
2011–12	UEFA Europa League	GS	(Belgium) Club Brugge	1–2	1–1	2nd
2011–12	UEFA Europa League	GS	(Slovenia) Maribor	5–1	1–1	2nd
2011–12	UEFA Europa League	R32	(Turkey) Beşiktaş	0–2	1–0	1–2
2012–13	UEFA Champions League	PO	(Italy) Udinese	1–1	1–1 (a.e.t.)	1–1 (5–4 p)
2012–13	UEFA Champions League	GS	(Romania) CFR Cluj	0–2	1–3	4th
2012–13	UEFA Champions League	GS	(Turkey) Galatasaray	1–2	2–0	4th
2012–13	UEFA Champions League	GS	(England) Manchester United	1–3	2–3	4th
2013–14	UEFA Europa League	PO	(Romania) Pandurii Târgu Jiu	0–2 (aet)	1–0	1–2
2015–16	UEFA Europa League	GS	(Czech Republic) Slovan Liberec	2–1	1–0	1st
2015–16	UEFA Europa League	GS	(Netherlands) Groningen	1–0	0–0	1st
2015–16	UEFA Europa League	GS	(France) Marseille	3–2	0–1	1st
2015–16	UEFA Europa League	R32	(Switzerland) Sion	2–2	2–1	4–3
2015–16	UEFA Europa League	R16	(Turkey) Fenerbahçe	4–1	0–1	4–2
2015–16	UEFA Europa League	QF	(Ukraine) Shakhtar Donetsk	1–2	0–4	1–6
2016–17	UEFA Europa League	GS	(Belgium) Gent	1–1	2–2	3rd
2016–17	UEFA Europa League	GS	(Ukraine) Shakhtar Donetsk	2–4	0–2	3rd
2016–17	UEFA Europa League	GS	(Turkey) Konyaspor	3–1	1–1	3rd
2017–18	UEFA Europa League	Q3	(Sweden) AIK	2–1	1–1	3–2
2017–18	UEFA Europa League	PO	(Iceland) FH	3–2	2–1	5–3
2017–18	UEFA Europa League	GS	(Bulgaria) Ludogorets Razgrad	0–2	1–1	1st
2017–18	UEFA Europa League	GS	(Turkey) İstanbul Başakşehir	2–1	1–2	1st
2017–18	UEFA Europa League	GS	(Germany) 1899 Hoffenheim	3–1	1–2	1st
2017–18	UEFA Europa League	R32	(France) Marseille	1–0	0–3	1–3
2018–19	UEFA Europa League	Q3	(Ukraine) Zorya Luhansk	2–2	1−1	3–3 (a)
2019–20	UEFA Europa League	Q3	(Denmark) Brøndby	3–1	4−2	7–3
2019–20	UEFA Europa League	PO	(Russia) Spartak Moscow	1–0	2–1	3–1
2019–20	UEFA Europa League	GS	(England) Wolverhampton Wanderers	3−3	1–0	1st
2019–20	UEFA Europa League	GS	(Slovakia) Slovan Bratislava	2−2	4–2	1st
2019–20	UEFA Europa League	GS	(Turkey) Beşiktaş	3–1	2–1	1st
2019–20	UEFA Europa League	R32	(Scotland) Rangers	0–1	2–3	2–4
2020–21	UEFA Europa League	GS	(England) Leicester City	3−3	0–4	2nd
2020–21	UEFA Europa League	GS	(Greece) AEK Athens	3–0	4–2	2nd
2020–21	UEFA Europa League	GS	(Ukraine) Zorya Luhansk	2–0	2–1	2nd
2020–21	UEFA Europa League	R32	(Italy) Roma	0–2	1–3	1–5
2021–22	UEFA Europa League	GS	(Serbia) Red Star Belgrade	1–1	1–2	2nd
2021–22	UEFA Europa League	GS	(Bulgaria) Ludogorets Razgrad	4–2	1–0	2nd
2021–22	UEFA Europa League	GS	(Denmark) Midtjylland	3–1	2–3	2nd
2021–22	UEFA Europa League	KPO	(Moldova) Sheriff Tiraspol	2–0 (a.e.t.)	0–2	2–2 (3–2 p)
2021–22	UEFA Europa League	R16	(France) Monaco	2–0	1–1	3–1
2021–22	UEFA Europa League	QF	(Scotland) Rangers	1–0	1–3 (a.e.t.)	2–3
2022–23	UEFA Europa League	GS	(Sweden) Malmö FF	2–1	2–0	3rd
2022–23	UEFA Europa League	GS	(Germany) Union Berlin	1–0	0–1	3rd
2022–23	UEFA Europa League	GS	(Belgium) Union Saint-Gilloise	1–2	3–3	3rd
2022–23	UEFA Europa Conference League	KPO	(Italy) Fiorentina	0–4	2–3	2–7
2023–24	UEFA Champions League	QR3	(Serbia) TSC	3–0	4–1	7–1
2023–24	UEFA Champions League	PO	(Greece) Panathinaikos	2–1	1–0	3–1
2023–24	UEFA Champions League	GS	(Italy) Napoli	1–2	0–2	3rd
2023–24	UEFA Champions League	GS	(Germany) Union Berlin	1–1	3–2	3rd
2023–24	UEFA Champions League	GS	(Spain) Real Madrid	1–2	0–3	3rd
2023–24	UEFA Europa League	KPO	(Azerbaijan) Qarabağ	2–4	3–2 (a.e.t.)	5–6
2024–25	UEFA Europa League	Q2	(Israel) Maccabi Petah Tikva	2–0	5–0	7–0
2024–25	UEFA Europa League	Q3	(Switzerland) Servette	0–0	2–1	2–1
2024–25	UEFA Europa League	PO	(Austria) Rapid Wien	2–1	2–2	4–3
2024–25	UEFA Europa League	LP	(Israel) Maccabi Tel Aviv	2–1	—N/a	25th
2024–25	UEFA Europa League	LP	(Greece) Olympiacos	—N/a	0–3	25th
2024–25	UEFA Europa League	LP	(Norway) Bodø/Glimt	1–2	—N/a	25th
2024–25	UEFA Europa League	LP	(Sweden) IF Elfsborg	—N/a	1–1	25th
2024–25	UEFA Europa League	LP	(Germany) TSG Hoffenheim	3–0	—N/a	25th
2024–25	UEFA Europa League	LP	(Italy) Roma	—N/a	0–3	25th
2024–25	UEFA Europa League	LP	(Belgium) Union Saint-Gilloise	—N/a	1–2	25th
2024–25	UEFA Europa League	LP	(Italy) Lazio	1–0	—N/a	25th
2025–26	UEFA Europa League	Q2	(Bulgaria) Levski Sofia	1–0 (a.e.t.)	0–0	1–0
2025–26	UEFA Europa League	Q3	(Romania) CFR Cluj	2–0	2–1	4–1
2025–26	UEFA Europa League	PO	(Gibraltar) Lincoln Red Imps	5–1	4–0	9–1
2025–26	UEFA Europa League	LP	(Netherlands) Feyenoord	1–0	—N/a	6th
2025–26	UEFA Europa League	LP	(Scotland) Celtic	—N/a	2–0	6th
2025–26	UEFA Europa League	LP	(Serbia) Red Star Belgrade	2–0	—N/a	6th
2025–26	UEFA Europa League	LP	(Belgium) Genk	3–4	—N/a	6th
2025–26	UEFA Europa League	LP	(Scotland) Rangers	—N/a	1–1	6th
2025–26	UEFA Europa League	LP	(France) Nice	—N/a	1–0	6th
2025–26	UEFA Europa League	LP	(England) Nottingham Forest	1–0	—N/a	6th
2025–26	UEFA Europa League	LP	(Netherlands) Go Ahead Eagles	—N/a	0–0	6th
2025–26	UEFA Europa League	R16	(Hungary) Ferencváros	4–0	0–2	4–2
2025–26	UEFA Europa League	QF	(Spain) Real Betis	1–1	4–2	5–3
2025–26	UEFA Europa League	SF	(Germany) SC Freiburg	2–1	1–3	3–4
2026–27	UEFA Conference League	Q2	(Serbia) Železničar Pančevo	4–0	1–0	5–0
2026–27	UEFA Conference League	Q3	(Belarus) Dinamo Minsk	1–0	0–0	1–0
2026–27	UEFA Conference League	PO	Austria Wien	2–0	0–0	2–0
2026–27	UEFA Conference League	LP	(Denmark) Copenhagen	—N/a	0–3	
2026–27	UEFA Conference League	LP	(Belgium) Gent	2–0	—N/a	
2026–27	UEFA Conference League	LP	(Denmark) AGF	—N/a		
2026–27	UEFA Conference League	LP	(Finland) KuPS		—N/a	
2026–27	UEFA Conference League	LP	(Norway) Brann	—N/a		
2026–27	UEFA Conference League	LP	(Albania) Egnatia		—N/a	

Last updated: 20 August 2026
Note: Braga score always listed first.

== Honours ==
- UEFA Intertoto Cup

- Winners (1): 2008

== Overall record ==
=== By competition ===
As of 27 August 2026

SC Braga record in European football by competition
Competition	Pld	W	D	L	GF	GA	GD	Win% (Note: Win% is rounded to two decimal places.)
UEFA Champions League / European Cup	28	12	3	13	39	45	−6	42.86
UEFA Cup Winners' Cup	10	6	1	3	13	11	+2	60.00
UEFA Europa League / UEFA Cup	175	82	38	55	267	212	+55	46.86
UEFA Conference League	8	4	2	2	10	7	+3	50.00
UEFA Intertoto Cup	2	2	0	0	5	0	+5	100.00
Total	223	106	44	73	334	275	+59	47.53

=== Finals ===
Year	Competition	Opposing team	Score	Venue
2011	UEFA Europa League	(Portugal) Porto	0–1	(Republic of Ireland) Aviva Stadium, Dublin
