= Hélder Barbosa =

Portuguese footballer

Personal information
- Full name: Hélder Jorge Leal Rodrigues Barbosa
- Date of birth: 25 May 1987 (age 39)
- Place of birth: Paredes, Portugal
- Height: 1.73 m (5 ft 8 in)
- Position: Winger

Youth career
- 1995–1998: Paredes
- 1998–2005: Porto

Senior career*
Years	Team	Apps	(Gls)
2005–2006	Porto B	20	(6)
2006–2010	Porto	5	(0)
2006–2008	→ Académica (loan)	23	(4)
2008–2009	→ Trofense (loan)	28	(1)
2009–2010	→ Vitória Setúbal (loan)	26	(2)
2010–2014	Braga	66	(12)
2013–2014	→ Almería (loan)	28	(1)
2014–2016	AEK Athens	56	(14)
2016–2017	Al-Wasl	13	(0)
2017–2019	Akhisarspor	46	(4)
2019–2021	Hatayspor	38	(4)
2021–2022	Panetolikos	31	(2)
2022–2023	Varzim	15	(0)
Total		395	(50)

International career
2003	Portugal U16	4	(0)
2002–2004	Portugal U17	37	(3)
2004–2005	Portugal U18	5	(0)
2005–2006	Portugal U19	17	(7)
2006	Portugal U20	1	(0)
2006–2008	Portugal U21	13	(1)
2009	Portugal U23	1	(0)
2012	Portugal	1	(0)
Medal record
Men's football
Representing Portugal
UEFA European U17 Championship
Winner	2003 Portugal
- * Club domestic league appearances and goals

Hélder Jorge Leal Rodrigues Barbosa (born 25 May 1987) is a Portuguese former professional footballer who played as a left winger.

He amassed Primeira Liga totals of 148 matches and 19 goals, mainly for Braga (three seasons) and Académica (two). He also played for teams in Spain, Greece, the United Arab Emirates and Turkey.

All youth levels comprised, Barbosa won 77 caps for Portugal. He made his senior debut in 2012.

== Club career ==
=== Porto ===
Barbosa was born in Paredes, Porto District. A product of FC Porto's youth academy, he made his Primeira Liga debut in the last day of the 2005–06 season, with the northerners already crowned champions: he played the second half of a 1–1 away derby against Boavista FC, and was sent off in the last minute.

From 2006 to 2008, Barbosa was loaned to fellow top-division club Académica de Coimbra, but was recalled by Porto in mid-January 2008 to make up for the loss of Tarik Sektioui, who was selected by Morocco for the Africa Cup of Nations. He served another loan in 2008–09 to lowly newcomers C.D. Trofense, notably scoring against S.L. Benfica in an historic 2–0 home win. He only missed two league games during the season, but could not help prevent immediate relegation.

Barbosa was again loaned for the following campaign, now to Vitória de Setúbal. He scored his first goal for the Sadinos on 31 August 2009, but in a 8–1 loss at Benfica.

=== Braga ===
On 2 July 2010, after helping Setúbal avoid top-flight relegation, Barbosa was released by Porto, signing a three-year contract with S.C. Braga. Rarely used in the first months, he began gaining more playing time after the January 2011 departure of Matheus, who left for a team in Ukraine, and contributed four league goals in an eventual fourth-place finish.

In less than one month, starting on 25 August 2011, Barbosa scored in four consecutive games for Braga, including one goal in a 3–1 home victory over Gil Vicente F.C. and two at Birmingham City in the group stage of the UEFA Europa League, in another 3–1 win. The following 14 February, he was sent off for a second bookable offence in the 0–2 home loss to Beşiktaş J.K. for the Europa League round-of-32, after diving in the penalty area.

Barbosa was loaned to La Liga side UD Almería on 28 August 2013. He netted his only goal for the Andalusians on 11 January 2014, but in a 6–1 away defeat against Athletic Bilbao.

=== AEK Athens ===
On 31 July 2014, Barbosa signed a three-year deal with AEK Athens F.C. on a free transfer. He scored five goals in 26 appearances in his debut season, helping the club return to the Super League Greece after a two-year absence.

=== Later years ===
On 24 August 2016, Barbosa joined Al-Wasl F.C. from the UAE Arabian Gulf League on a three-year contract for a transfer fee of €750.000, earning €600.000 per year. The following summer, he moved to the Süper Lig with Akhisarspor after agreeing to a two-year deal. On 10 May 2018, both he and countryman Miguel Lopes scored as the latter club beat Fenerbahçe S.K. 3–2 in the final of the Turkish Cup, for its first-ever major trophy.

Barbosa continued in Turkey in the 2019–20 season, signing with Hatayspor of the TFF First League. The 33-year-old returned to the Greek top tier on 14 January 2021, on a one-and-a-half-year contract at Panetolikos FC.

On 18 November 2022, Barbosa returned to his country for the first time in nine years, signing for Varzim S.C. until the end of the Liga 3 season. In January 2024, he announced his retirement.

== International career ==
Barbosa made his debut for Portugal on 14 November 2012 in a friendly with Gabon, playing the last 11 minutes of the 2–2 draw in Libreville after coming on as a substitute for Braga teammate Custódio.

== Career statistics ==
As of match played on 4 March 2018

Club	Season	League			National Cup		League Cup		Continental		Total	
Club	Season	Division	Apps	Goals	Apps	Goals	Apps	Goals	Apps	Goals	Apps	Goals
Porto	2005–06	Primeira Liga	1	0	0	0	0	0	0	0	1	0
Porto	2007–08	Primeira Liga	4	0	2	0	0	0	0	0	6	0
Porto	Total		5	0	2	0	0	0	0	0	7	0
Académica (loan)	2006–07	Primeira Liga	7	2	0	0	0	0	–		7	2
Académica (loan)	2007–08	Primeira Liga	16	2	1	0	1	0	–		18	2
Académica (loan)	Total		23	4	1	0	1	0	–		25	4
Trofense (loan)	2008–09	Primeira Liga	28	1	1	0	2	0	–		31	1
Vitória Setúbal (loan)	2009–10	Primeira Liga	26	2	2	0	0	0	–		28	2
Braga	2010–11	Primeira Liga	17	4	1	0	2	0	8 (Note: Three appearances in UEFA Champions League, five appearances in UEFA Europa League)	0	28	4
Braga	2011–12	Primeira Liga	29	6	1	0	4	1	9 (Note: Appearances in UEFA Europa League)	4	43	11
Braga	2012–13	Primeira Liga	20	2	1	0	2	0	6 (Note: Appearances in UEFA Champions League)	0	29	2
Braga	Total		66	12	3	0	8	1	23	4	100	17
Almería (loan)	2013–14	La Liga	28	1	3	0	–		–		31	1
AEK Athens	2014–15	Football League (Greece)	26	5	7	1	–		–		33	6
AEK Athens	2015–16	Super League Greece	30	9	4	0	–		–		34	9
AEK Athens	2016–17	Super League Greece	0	0	0	0	–		2	0	2	0
Total			56	14	11	1	0	0	2	0	69	15
Al-Wasl	2016–17	UAE Pro League	13	0	0	0	6	1	–		19	1
Akhisarspor	2017–18	Süper Lig	13	0	5	1	–		–		18	1
Career total			258	34	28	2	17	2	25	4	328	42

== Honours ==
Porto

- Primeira Liga: 2005–06, 2007–08

Braga

- Taça da Liga: 2012–13

AEK Athens

- Greek Football Cup: 2015–16
- Football League (Greece): 2014–15 (South Group)

Akhisarspor

- Turkish Cup: 2017–18
- Turkish Super Cup: 2018
