= Carlos Velasco Carballo =

Spanish football referee

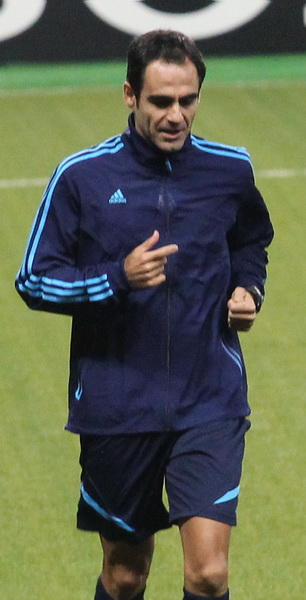
- Velasco Carballo warming up prior to the Spartak Moscow–Chelsea Champions League match in October 2010
- Born: 16 March 1971 (age 55); Madrid, Spain
- Other occupation: Industrial Engineer

Domestic
Years	League	Role
2004–2016	La Liga	Referee

International
Years	League	Role
2008–2016	FIFA listed	Referee

Carlos Velasco Carballo (Spanish pronunciation: [ˈkaɾlos βeˈlasko kaɾˈβaʎo]; (Note: In isolation, Velasco is pronounced [beˈlasko].) born 16 March 1971) is a retired Spanish professional football referee.

== Career ==
He is affiliated with the Madrid committee and has officiated in Spanish Primera División since 2004, as well as in international matches since 2008.

Velasco officiated 2011 UEFA Europa League Final match in Dublin, between Porto and Braga.

On 20 December 2011, UEFA named him one of the twelve referees for UEFA Euro 2012. Velasco took charge of the tournament's opening match between Poland and Greece, issuing a first-half red card to Greek defender Sokratis Papastathopoulos, before sending-off Poland goalkeeper Wojciech Szczęsny in the second period as the teams drew 1–1 in Warsaw. He was also a referee in the 2014 FIFA World Cup, in which he officiated the quarterfinal match between Brazil and Colombia. He was criticized for making bad calls and favoring Brazil by many people, including former referee Graham Poll and Radamel Falcao, who tweeted, "For the next match remember to call the referee who didn't show up today". A Colombian lawyer also claimed to be suing FIFA for $1.3 billion because of their bad referee choices.

Since 2017, Velasco is responsible for video assistant referee system integration into Spanish La Liga starting from season 2018/2019.

== Notes ==
Preceded by 2010 (Italy) Nicola Rizzoli	UEFA Europa League Final referee 2011 (Spain) Carlos Velasco Carballo	Succeeded by 2012 (Germany) Wolfgang Stark
