= Miguel Garcia (Portuguese footballer) =

Portuguese footballer

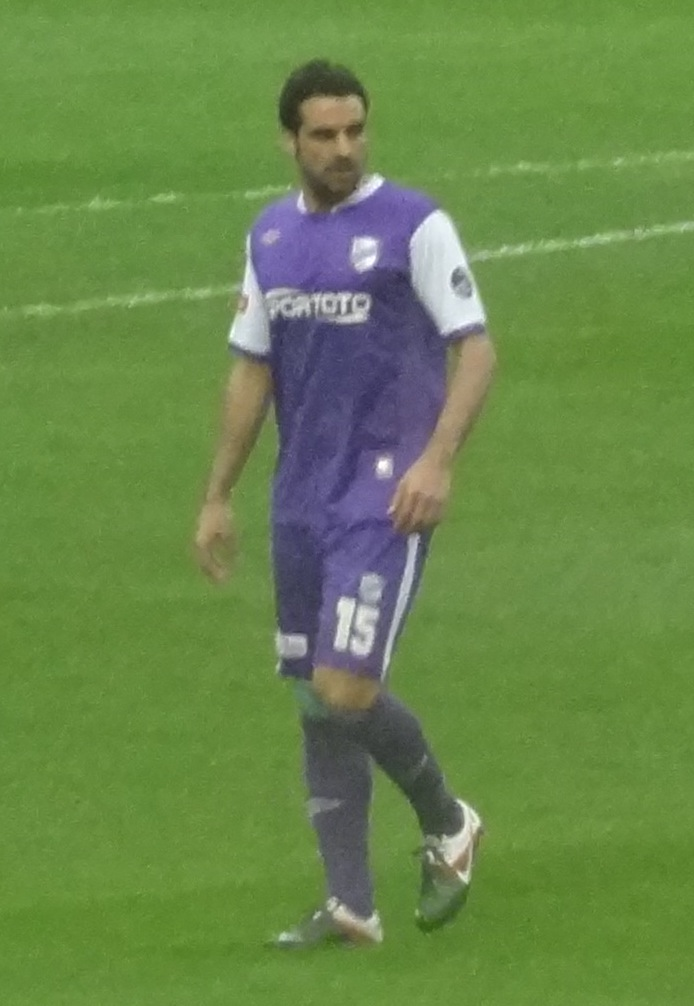
- Garcia in action for Orduspor in 2012

Personal information
- Full name: Miguel Ângelo Moita Garcia
- Date of birth: 4 February 1983 (age 43)
- Place of birth: Moura, Portugal
- Height: 1.79 m (5 ft 10 in)
- Position: Defender

Youth career
- 1992–1997: Moura
- 1997–2002: Sporting CP

Senior career*
Years	Team	Apps	(Gls)
2002–2003	Sporting CP B	37	(0)
2003–2007	Sporting CP	61	(0)
2007–2008	Reggina	0	(0)
2009	Olhanense	11	(0)
2010–2011	Braga	23	(0)
2011–2013	Orduspor	56	(2)
2013–2014	Mallorca	10	(0)
2014	NorthEast United	13	(0)
2015	Sporting Goa	17	(0)
2015	NorthEast United	1	(0)
Total		229	(2)

International career
2001	Portugal U17	7	(0)
2001–2002	Portugal U19	12	(0)
2003	Portugal U20	7	(0)
2004–2005	Portugal U21	12	(0)
2006	Portugal B	1	(0)
Medal record
Men's football
Representing Portugal
UEFA European Under-21 Championship
Third place	2004 Germany
- * Club domestic league appearances and goals

Miguel Ângelo Moita Garcia (born 4 February 1983) is a Portuguese former professional footballer who played mainly as a right-back.

== Club career ==
Garcia was born in Moura, Alentejo, being a youth product of Sporting CP and making his debut with the first team in 2003–04, in a 2–1 away win against Académica de Coimbra where he played the first half. The following season was remarkable for him: first, against S.L. Benfica in the Taça de Portugal, he missed the penalty that eliminated his team in the round of 16 on 26 January 2005. On 5 May, in the last minute of extra time, he scored a header in the UEFA Cup semi-finals second leg against AZ Alkmaar, as Sporting lost 3–2 away but qualified through the away goals rule.

Garcia signed a pre-contract agreement with Reggina Calcio, joining in summer 2007 after his link with Sporting expired. He suffered a serious knee injury in October, and did not play a single match for the Italian side; on 17 March of the following year, the club communicated the decision to terminate his contract.

In July 2009, after more than two years out of football, Garcia joined Jorge Costa's S.C. Olhanense, recently promoted to the Primeira Liga. However, as João Pereira arrived from S.C. Braga to former side Sporting in late December, he was chosen as his immediate replacement, moving for €50,000 on a one-and-a-half-year contract.

On 1 September 2014, after spells in Turkey and Spain, Garcia joined NorthEast United FC for the inaugural campaign of the Indian Super League. On 15 January of the following year he signed with another club in the nation, I-League's Sporting Clube de Goa, returning to his previous team on 20 June.

After suffering a bilateral achilles tendinopathy injury in the opening game of the 2015 season, against Kerala Blasters FC on 6 October, Garcia was sidelined for several months.

== International career ==
Garcia was a member of the Portugal under-21 side at the 2004 UEFA European Championship, which saw them finish in third place. He failed to gain a place in the squad that competed in Olympic football in Athens the same year, however.

== Post-retirement ==
After retiring, Garcia majored in real estate and started his own company.

== Career statistics ==
Club	Season	League			Cup		Continental		Total	
Club	Season	Division	Apps	Goals	Apps	Goals	Apps	Goals	Apps	Goals
Sporting CP	2003–04	Primeira Liga	25	0	0	0	0	0	0	0
Sporting CP	2004–05	Primeira Liga	15	0	2	0	7 (Note: Appearances in UEFA Cup)	1	24	1
Sporting CP	2005–06	Primeira Liga	16	0	4	0	3 (Note: Appearances in UEFA Champions League and UEFA Cup)	0	23	0
Sporting CP	2006–07	Primeira Liga	5	0	1	0	2 (Note: Appearances in UEFA Champions League)	0	8	0
Sporting CP	Total		61	0	7	0	12	1	80	1
Reggina	2007–08	Serie A	0	0	0	0	—		0	0
Olhanense	2009–10	Primeira Liga	11	0	1	0	—		12	0
Braga	2009–10	Primeira Liga	5	0	2	0	0	0	7	0
Braga	2010–11	Primeira Liga	18	0	3	0	15 (Note: Appearances in UEFA Champions League and UEFA Europa League)	0	36	0
Braga	Total		23	0	5	0	15	0	43	0
Orduspor	2011–12	Süper Lig	30	2	5	0	—		35	2
Orduspor	2012–13	Süper Lig	26	0	1	0	—		27	0
Orduspor	Total		56	2	6	0	—		62	2
Mallorca	2013–14	Segunda División	10	0	0	0	—		10	0
NorthEast United	2014	Indian Super League	13	0	—				13	0
Sporting Goa	2015	I-League	17	0	0	0	—		17	0
NorthEast United	2015	Indian Super League	1	0	—				1	0
Career total			192	2	19	0	27	1	238	3

== Honours ==
Sporting CP

- Taça de Portugal: 2006–07
- UEFA Cup runner-up: 2004–05

Braga

- UEFA Europa League runner-up: 2010–11
