= Diego (footballer, born 1989) =

Portuguese footballer

Personal information
- Full name: Diego Martins da Costa e Silva
- Date of birth: 3 October 1989 (age 37)
- Place of birth: Barcelos, Portugal
- Height: 1.90 m (6 ft 3 in)
- Position: Goalkeeper

Youth career
- 2006–2008: Braga

Senior career*
| Years | Team | Apps | (Gls) |
| 2008–2012 | Braga | 0 | (0) |
| 2008–2009 | → Ribeirão (loan) | 11 | (0) |
| 2009–2010 | → Covilhã (loan) | 14 | (0) |
| 2010–2011 | → Vizela (loan) | 3 | (0) |
| 2011 | → Naval (loan) | 0 | (0) |
| 2011–2012 | → Vizela (loan) | 28 | (0) |
| 2012 | Vilaverdense | 8 | (0) |
| 2013 | Famalicão | 3 | (0) |
| 2013–2015 | Salgueiros 08 | 16 | (0) |
| 2015–2018 | Cinfães | 77 | (0) |
| 2018–2019 | Felgueiras 1932 | 15 | (0) |
| 2019–2020 | Espinho | 0 | (0) |

International career
| 2007–2008 | Portugal U19 | 4 | (0) |
| 2009 | Portugal U21 | 1 | (0) |
- * Club domestic league appearances and goals as of 16:59, 26 January 2021 (UTC)

Diego Martins da Costa e Silva (born 3 October 1989 in Barcelos), known as simply Diego, is a Portuguese footballer who plays as a goalkeeper.

== Club career ==
Diego started his football career at Sporting de Braga. In June 2008 he signed a 1+2 professional contract with the Minho club, but spent his first years as a senior or loan, to various clubs in the Portuguese second and third divisions.

== International career ==
Diego was capped once for the Portuguese U21s, in a friendly match. He also played for the U19 side in the 2008 UEFA European Football Championship elite qualification.
