= Alberto Rodríguez (footballer, born 1984) =

Peruvian footballer

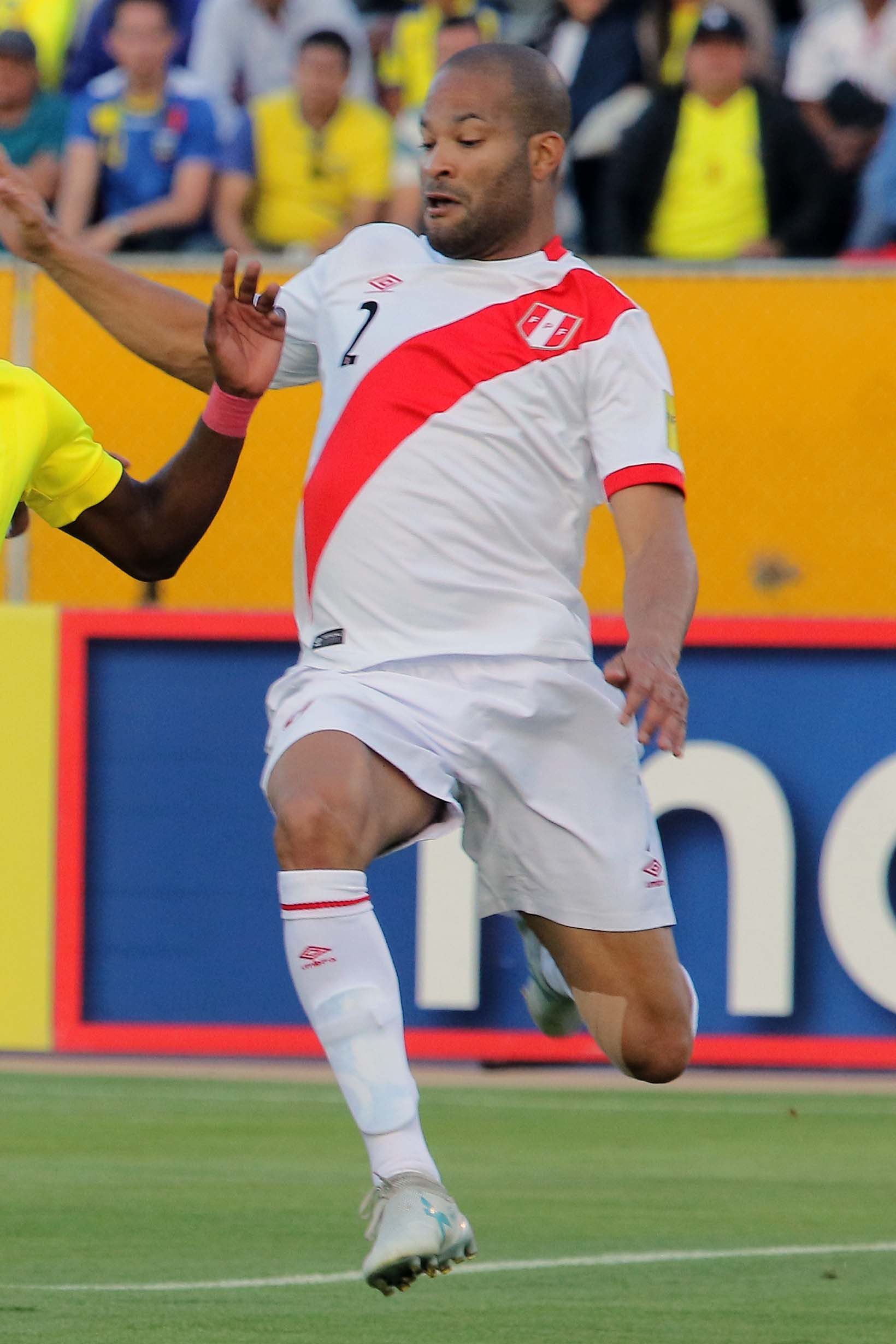
- Rodríguez with Peru in 2017

Personal information
- Full name: Alberto Junior Rodríguez Valdelomar
- Date of birth: 31 March 1984 (age 42)
- Place of birth: Lima, Peru
- Height: 1.79 m (5 ft 10 in)
- Position: Centre-back

Youth career
- 2000–2001: Sporting Cristal

Senior career*
| Years | Team | Apps | (Gls) |
| 2002–2006 | Sporting Cristal | 155 | (10) |
| 2007–2011 | Braga | 79 | (3) |
| 2011–2012 | Sporting CP | 7 | (0) |
| 2012–2014 | Rio Ave | 32 | (3) |
| 2015–2016 | Sporting Cristal | 28 | (1) |
| 2016 | Melgar | 6 | (0) |
| 2016–2017 | Universitario | 22 | (1) |
| 2018 | Atlético Junior | 5 | (0) |
| 2018–2019 | Universitario | 6 | (0) |
| 2020 | Alianza Lima | 12 | (0) |
| 2021 | Alianza Atlético | 8 | (0) |
| Total | | 360 | (18) |

International career
| 2003–2018 | Peru | 75 | (0) |
Medal record
Men's football
Representing Peru
Copa America
| Third place | 2011 Argentina |
| Third place | 2015 Chile |
- * Club domestic league appearances and goals

Alberto Junior Rodríguez Valdelomar, nicknamed El mudo (lit. 'mute') (born 31 March 1984), is a Peruvian former professional footballer who played as a central defender.

== Club career ==
Born in Lima, Rodríguez joined Sporting Cristal's youth system at the age of 16. He never appeared in less than 30 Primera División matches over four full seasons, with the capital side winning two Clausura titles.

On 28 December 2006, Rodríguez signed a three-and-a-half-year deal with Primeira Liga club S.C. Braga and, on 18 February 2007, played his first league match against U.D. Leiria. He finished his first season in Portugal with nine appearances, helping the Minho team to finish fourth.

Rodríguez was irregularly used in the following campaigns due to constant injury problems, but contributed 20 games as the team finished in a best-ever second place in 2010, adding seven in their subsequent runner-up run in the UEFA Europa League. On 27 May 2011, he agreed to a four-year contract with Sporting CP.

Under former Braga boss Domingos Paciência, Rodríguez's only season was again greatly undermined by physical problems, and he only played 13 competitive matches. In mid-July 2012 he was loaned to Deportivo de La Coruña of La Liga, moving to the Spanish club as many teammates, but returned to Lisbon after failing his medical.

On 24 July 2012, Rodríguez bought out his contract with Sporting and signed for one year with Rio Ave F.C. in the same league. After returning to his country, he represented in quick succession Sporting Cristal, FBC Melgar, Club Universitario de Deportes and Atlético Junior (Colombia).

== International career ==
Rodríguez represented Peru during the 2006 FIFA World Cup qualifiers after winning the first of his 75 caps on 2 April 2003 in a friendly with Chile, and quickly became a defensive cornerstone for the national side. He appeared for the country at the 2007 Copa América, in an eventual quarter-final exit.

Rodríguez was also selected for the 2011 Copa América squad, being an important defensive unit as the Sergio Markarián-led team finished in third place in Argentina. At age 34, he was selected to the 2018 World Cup in Russia, making his debut in the competition on 16 June by playing the entire 1–0 group stage loss against Denmark.

== Career statistics ==
=== International ===
Peru
| Year | Apps | Goals |
|---|---|---|
| 2003 | 3 | 0 |
| 2004 | 2 | 0 |
| 2005 | 3 | 0 |
| 2006 | 2 | 0 |
| 2007 | 9 | 0 |
| 2008 | 4 | 0 |
| 2009 | 8 | 0 |
| 2010 | 0 | 0 |
| 2011 | 7 | 0 |
| 2012 | 3 | 0 |
| 2013 | 7 | 0 |
| 2014 | 2 | 0 |
| 2015 | 0 | 0 |
| 2016 | 11 | 0 |
| 2017 | 10 | 0 |
| 2018 | 4 | 0 |
| Total | 75 | 0 |

== Honours ==
Sporting Cristal

- Peruvian Primera División: Clausura 2002, 2004, 2016

Braga

- UEFA Intertoto Cup: 2008
- UEFA Europa League runner-up: 2010–11

Sporting CP

- Taça de Portugal runner-up: 2011–12

Rio Ave

- Taça de Portugal runner-up: 2013–14
- Taça da Liga runner-up: 2013–14

Peru

- Copa América third place: 2011

Peru U18

- Bolivarian Games: 2001
