= Vandinho (footballer, born 1978) =

Brazilian footballer

Personal information
- Full name: Vanderson Válter de Almeida
- Date of birth: 15 January 1978 (age 48)
- Place of birth: Cuiabá, Brazil
- Height: 1.83 m (6 ft 0 in)
- Position: Midfielder

Senior career*
| Years | Team | Apps | (Gls) |
| 1998 | Internacional | | |
| 1999 | Pelotas | | |
| 2000 | Guarani | | |
| 2000 | Santa Cruz | 14 | (1) |
| 2001 | Criciúma | | |
| 2002 | Grêmio Inhumense | | |
| 2002–2004 | Rio Ave | 53 | (4) |
| 2004–2011 | Braga | 158 | (8) |
| 2011 | Sharjah | 6 | (0) |
| 2012 | Paraná | 11 | (0) |
| 2013 | Santo Ângelo | | |
| 2013 | Cuiabá | 15 | (0) |
| 2014 | Grêmio Anápolis | 9 | (0) |
- * Club domestic league appearances and goals

Vanderson Válter de Almeida (born 15 January 1978), known as Vandinho, is a Brazilian former footballer who played as a central midfielder.

He spent most of his professional career in Portugal, amassing Primeira Liga totals of 182 matches and nine goals over eight seasons.

== Club career ==
Vandinho was born in Cuiabá, Mato Grosso. After an unsuccessful spell at Sport Club Internacional, he played mainly with modest clubs in his country: Grêmio Esportivo Brasil, Guarani Futebol Clube, Santa Cruz Futebol Clube, Criciúma Esporte Clube and Grêmio Esportivo Inhumense, moving in 2002–03 to Portugal with Rio Ave F.C. and helping the Vila do Conde team return to the Primeira Liga in his first season.

For the 2004–05 campaign, Vandinho joined S.C. Braga, being an ever-present midfield unit as the Minho side achieved two consecutive fourth-league places from 2005 to 2007. During his second year he contributed 31 matches and three goals, including in both fixtures against former team Rio Ave (2–1 away, 5–0 at home).

In February 2010, as he continued to be first choice and Braga led the league, Vandinho received a three-month ban for his actions in a scuffle during a 2–0 home win over S.L. Benfica late in the previous year. That effectively ended his season, as they were eventually surpassed in the table by the opponents in that game.

Vandinho helped Braga reach the final of the UEFA Europa League in 2010–11, scoring through a header in the semi-finals' first leg, a 2–1 away loss against Benfica (2–2 aggregate victory). In late August 2011, after nearly one full decade in the same country, the 33-year-old joined Sharjah FC in the United Arab Emirates, for an undisclosed fee.
