= Custódio Castro =

Portuguese footballer

Custódio
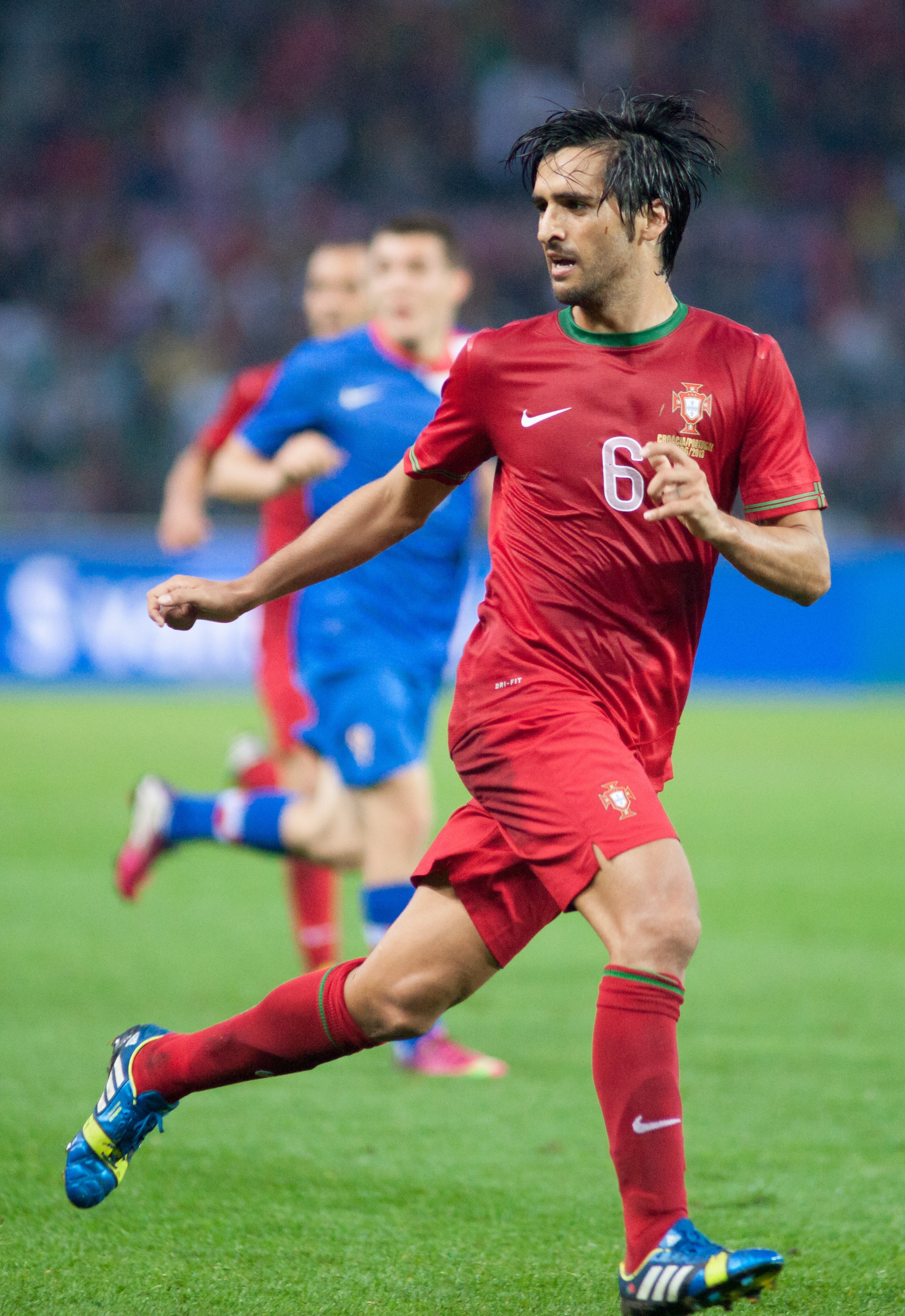
- Custódio playing for Portugal in 2013

Personal information
- Full name: Custódio Miguel Dias de Castro
- Date of birth: 24 May 1983 (age 43)
- Place of birth: Brito, Portugal
- Height: 1.80 m (5 ft 11 in)
- Position: Defensive midfielder

Youth career
- 1993–1994: Torcatense
- 1994–2000: Vitória Guimarães
- 2000–2001: Sporting CP

Senior career*
Years	Team	Apps	(Gls)
2001–2003	Sporting CP B	48	(5)
2002–2007	Sporting CP	95	(4)
2007–2008	Dynamo Moscow	9	(0)
2009–2010	Vitória Guimarães	27	(0)
2010–2015	Braga	87	(8)
2015–2017	Akhisar Belediyespor	76	(4)
Total		342	(21)

International career
1999	Portugal U15	5	(0)
2000	Portugal U16	11	(2)
2000	Portugal U17	7	(1)
2001–2003	Portugal U19	8	(3)
2003	Portugal U20	10	(4)
2003–2006	Portugal U21	13	(0)
2006	Portugal B	1	(0)
2012–2013	Portugal	10	(0)

Managerial career
- 2020: Braga
- 2022–2025: Braga B
- 2025–2026: Alverca
Medal record
Men's football
Representing Portugal
UEFA European Championship
Bronze medal – third place	2012 Poland-Ukraine
UEFA European Under-21 Championship
Third place	2004 Germany
UEFA European Under-17 Championship
Winner	2000 Israel
- * Club domestic league appearances and goals

Custódio Miguel Dias de Castro (born 24 May 1983), known simply as Custódio, is a Portuguese former professional footballer who played as a defensive midfielder. He is currently a manager.

Over 12 seasons, he amassed Primeira Liga totals of 209 matches and 12 goals, representing in the competition Sporting CP, Vitória de Guimarães and Braga. He reached the 2011 Europa League final with the latter club, and also played in Russia and Turkey.

Custódio was part of the Portugal squad at Euro 2012, earning a total of ten caps in one year.

== Club career ==
Custódio was born in the village of Brito, Guimarães. From 2001 to 2007 he played for Sporting CP, making his Primeira Liga debut on 23 March 2002 in a 2–0 home win against Salgueiros; he finished the 2003–04 season with 27 league appearances.

In the 2006–07 campaign, coach Paulo Bento named Custódio captain in recognition of his history at Sporting and consistent displays in the previous seasons. Incidentally, in that timeframe, he also fell out of favour in the team's rotation and, in June 2007, was sold to Russian Premier League side Dynamo Moscow.

Custódio returned to Portugal in January 2009, re-joining childhood club Vitória de Guimarães along with Cícero Semedo. On 31 August of the following year, he moved to Minho neighbours Braga.

In his first season at the Estádio Municipal de Braga, Custódio battled for first-choice status with Brazilians Leandro Salino and Vandinho, but managed to appear in 21 competitive matches. On 5 February 2011, he scored from close range in a 2–1 away win against Marítimo, helping his team finish fourth in the league. He netted arguably the most important goal of his career on 5 May, heading from a corner kick for the game's only in a home victory over Benfica in the UEFA Europa League semi-finals second leg, with Braga qualifying for the final on the away goals rule.

Custódio spent the first half of 2011–12 on the sidelines, nursing a serious knee injury. When he returned to full fitness, however, he benefitted from Djamal Mahamat's presence in the 2012 Africa Cup of Nations and begun appearing regularly in the starting XI, scoring against Marítimo (2–1 away win) and his former employers Guimarães (4–0, at home).

In May 2017, after two and a half seasons in the Turkish Süper Lig with Akhisar Belediyespor, the 34-year-old Custódio retired and returned to Braga, being named assistant manager at the reserve side.

== International career ==
A Portugal under-21 international, Custódio appeared in two UEFA European Championship editions, 2004 and 2006. He was selected by full side manager Bento for his 23-man squad for UEFA Euro 2012, and made his debut on 2 June, a 1–3 friendly loss with Turkey in Lisbon. In the finals in Poland and Ukraine, he played 20 minutes in the decisive 2–1 group stage defeat of the Netherlands after replacing the injured Raul Meireles.

== Coaching career ==
On 3 March 2020, Custódio left Braga's under-17s and was appointed at the helm of the first team, replacing Sporting-bound Ruben Amorim. On his debut three days later, he managed a 3–1 home victory over Portimonense.

Custódio resigned on 1 July 2020 with five games left of the campaign, having won two and lost three of his six fixtures. Two years later, he was put in charge of the reserves.

On 3 June 2025, Custódio signed as head coach of Alverca, newly returned to the top division. He achieved an 11th-place finish in his only season, then left.

== Career statistics ==
=== Club ===
Club	Season	League		Cup		League Cup		Europe		Total	
Club	Season	Apps	Goals	Apps	Goals	Apps	Goals	Apps	Goals	Apps	Goals
Sporting CP B	2001–02	15	2	–	–	–	–	–	–	15	2
Sporting CP B	Total	15	2	–	–	–	–	–	–	15	2
Sporting CP	2001–02	1	0	0	0	–	–	0	0	1	0
Sporting CP	2002–03	0	0	0	0	–	–	0	0	0	0
Sporting CP	Total	1	0	0	0	–	–	0	0	1	0
Sporting CP B	2002–03	33	3	–	–	–	–	–	–	33	3
Sporting CP B	Total	33	3	–	–	–	–	–	–	33	3
Sporting CP	2003–04	27	0	1	0	–	–	3	0	31	0
Sporting CP	2004–05	25	4	3	0	–	–	8	3	36	7
Sporting CP	2005–06	27	0	4	0	–	–	2	0	33	0
Sporting CP	2006–07	15	0	4	1	–	–	2	0	21	1
Sporting CP	Total	94	4	12	1	–	–	15	3	121	8
Dynamo Moscow	2007	9	0	1	0	–	–	–	–	10	0
Dynamo Moscow	Total	9	0	1	0	–	–	–	–	10	0
Vitória Guimarães	2008–09	10	0	0	0	2	0	0	0	12	0
Vitória Guimarães	2009–10	15	0	2	0	5	0	–	–	22	0
Vitória Guimarães	2010–11	2	0	0	0	0	0	–	–	2	0
Vitória Guimarães	Total	27	0	2	0	7	0	0	0	36	0
Braga	2010–11	13	1	0	0	1	0	7	1	21	2
Braga	2011–12	17	3	0	0	3	0	2	0	22	3
Braga	2012–13	28	2	2	0	5	1	8	0	43	3
Braga	2013–14	21	2	4	0	3	1	1	0	28	3
Braga	2014–15	8	0	2	0	1	0	–	–	11	0
Braga	Total	87	8	8	0	13	2	18	1	126	11
Akhisar Belediyespor	2014–15	15	2	1	0	0	0	–	–	16	2
Akhisar Belediyespor	2015–16	33	1	9	0	0	0	–	–	42	1
Akhisar Belediyespor	2016–17	28	1	3	0	0	0	–	–	31	1
Akhisar Belediyespor	Total	76	4	13	0	0	0	-	-	89	4
Career Total		342	21	36	1	20	2	33	4	431	28

=== International ===
Portugal
Year	Apps	Goals
2012	6	0
2013	4	0
Total	10	0

== Managerial statistics ==
As of match played 17 February 2024

Managerial record by team and tenure
Team	Nat	From	To	Record								Ref
Team	Nat	From	To	G	W	D	L	GF	GA	GD	Win %	Ref
Braga	(Portugal)	5 March 2020	1 July 2020	6	2	1	3	11	11	+0	33.33	
Braga B	(Portugal)	9 June 2022	30 June 2025	50	21	11	18	63	52	+11	42.00	
Total				56	23	12	21	74	63	+11	41.07	—

== Honours ==
Sporting CP

- Primeira Liga: 2001–02
- Taça de Portugal: 2006–07
- UEFA Cup runner-up: 2004–05

Braga

- Taça da Liga: 2012–13
- Taça de Portugal runner-up: 2014–15
- UEFA Europa League runner-up: 2010–11

Portugal U16

- UEFA European Under-16 Championship: 2000

Portugal U21

- Toulon Tournament: 2003
