= 2005–06 FC Porto season =

Porto
2005–06 season
- Chairman: Pinto da Costa
- Manager: Co Adriaanse
- Stadium: Estádio do Dragão
- Primeira Liga: 1st
- Taça de Portugal: Winners
- Champions League: Group stage (4th place)
- Top goalscorer: League: Lucho González (10); All: Lucho González (12)
- Highest home attendance: 50,109 vs Benfica (15 October 2005)
- Lowest home attendance: 18,425 vs Marco (26 October 2005)
- Average home league attendance: 39,063
Home colours	Away colours	Third colours

The 2005–06 season was Futebol Clube do Porto's 95th competitive season, 72nd consecutive season in the top flight of Portuguese football, and 112th year in existence as a football club. Despite finishing bottom of their group in the UEFA Champions League group stage, Dutch coach Co Adriaanse led the Dragões to league and cup double.

== Key dates ==
- 20 January 2005: Porto sign Lucho González from River Plate for a €7 million transfer fee. González would join Porto in the summer following the end of the 2004–05 Argentine Primera División.
- 15 April 2005: Porto sign Argentine forward Lisandro López from Racing for a €2.3 million transfer fee.
- 24 May 2005: Co Adriaanse is appointed as the new manager on a two-year contract, with immediate effect.
- 8 July 2005: Porto agree a deal with Turkish defender Fatih Sonkaya on a €1.5 million transfer deal from Beşiktaş.
- 21 August 2005: Porto win their first match of the Primeira Liga season at home to Estrela da Amadora.
- 31 August 2005: The transfer deadline day sees Marek Čech join from Sparta Prague.
- 13 September 2005: Porto lose their first UEFA Champions League group stage match 3–2, to Rangers at Ibrox. Pepe scored both of Porto's goals.
- 28 September 2005: Porto suffer a second consecutive Champions League group stage lose to UEFA Champions League debutants Artmedia Bratislava. Porto led the game 2–0, but the Slovak side clawed back to score three goals to give Artmedia all three points.
- 15 October 2005: Porto suffer their first league defeat of the season, losing 2–0 to Benfica at the Estádio do Dragão.
- 19 October 2005: Porto defeat Italian side Inter Milan in their third UEFA Champions League group stage match. A Marco Materazzi own goal and a Benni McCarthy strike saw Porto claim all three points.
- 26 October 2005: Porto play host to Liga de Honra's Marco at the Estádio do Dragão, in a Taça de Portugal fourth round tie. The Dragões defeated the second division side 1–0. Ivanildo scored the only goal of the game.
- 1 November 2005: Porto suffer a third Champions League group stage loss after falling to Inter at the San Siro. The Nerazzurri defeated the dragons 2–1. Hugo Almeida scored Porto's only goal of the game.
- 19 November 2005: Porto demolish Académica de Coimbra, 5–1 in a Primeira Liga fixture.
- 23 November 2005: A late Ross McCormack goal denies Porto a crucial win in their fifth Champions League group stage match against Rangers.
- 2 December 2005: A second-half Jorginho strike grants Porto a draw against Sporting CP after Deivid had scored for the visitors.
- 6 December 2005: A goalless draw at Artmedia Bratislava's Stadium FC Petržalka 1898 leaves Porto bottom of their group, and eliminates them from all European competitions. Rangers would progress to the round of 16 whilst Artmedia would progress to the UEFA Cup round of 32.
- 11 January 2006: Porto defeat fellow Primeira Liga side Naval 2–1 at the Estádio Municipal José Bento Pessoa in a fifth round cup tie. Diego and Lucho González scored Porto's goals.
- 15 January 2006: Estrela da Amadora inflict on Porto, their second league loss of the season. The Amadora outfit would defeat Porto at the Estádio José Gomes, 2–1. Lucho González would score Porto's goal.
- 18 January 2006: Porto announce the signings of Brazilian duo Adriano and Anderson. Adriano would sign from Grêmio, whilst Anderson signed from Brazilian side Cruzeiro.
- 26 February 2006: Porto suffer their third league loss of the season after being defeated by Benfica. The Encarnados would defeat the Portistas 1–0. French midfielder Laurent Robert scored the only goal of the game.
- 15 March 2006: Porto progress to the Taça de Portugal semi-finals after beating Marítimo 2–1 at Estádio dos Barreiros. Benni McCarthy scored a goal in extra-time to grant Porto passage into the next round.
- 22 March 2006: Porto progress to the Taça de Portugal final after defeating Sporting CP on penalties. The 90 minutes ended goalless, forcing extra-time. Liédson scored in the second half of extra-time. Benni McCarthy equalised five minutes from the end. After João Moutinho missed his penalty, Lisandro López scored Porto's fifth penalty to grant them passage into the final.
- 8 April 2006: A late Jorginho strike gives Porto a crucial win over rivals Sporting CP.
- 22 April 2006: Porto wins their 21st Primeira Liga title, clinching the title after defeating Penafiel 1–0.
- 14 May 2006: Porto win the Taça de Portugal for the 13th time after beating Vitória de Setúbal 1–0 in the final. Adriano scored the only goal of the game.

== Players ==
=== Squad information ===
==== Appearances and goals ====
No.	Pos	Nat	Player	Total		Primeira Liga		Portuguese Cup		Europe	
No.	Pos	Nat	Player	Apps	Goals	Apps	Goals	Apps	Goals	Apps	Goals
Goalkeepers
1	GK	(Brazil) BRA	Helton	13	0	11	0	2	0	0	0
31	GK	(Portugal) POR	Paulo Ribeiro	1	0	0	0	1	0	0	0
99	GK	(Portugal) POR	Vítor Baía	32	0	24	0	2	0	6	0
Defenders
2	DF	(Portugal) POR	Jorge Costa	0	0	0	0	0	0	0	0
3	DF	(Portugal) POR	Ricardo Costa	23	1	18	1	2	0	3	0
4	DF	(Angola) ANG	Pedro Emanuel	36	0	26	0	5	0	5	0
5	DF	(Slovakia) SVK	Marek Čech	21	1	14	1	5	0	2	0
12	DF	(Portugal) POR	José Bosingwa	31	0	21	0	5	0	5	0
13	DF	(Portugal) POR	Bruno Alves	11	0	7	0	1	0	3	0
14	DF	(Portugal) POR	Pepe	33	3	24	1	4	0	5	2
15	DF	(Portugal) POR	Nuno Valente	0	0	0	0	0	0	0	0
21	DF	(Portugal) POR	César Peixoto	20	4	16	4	0	0	4	0
22	DF	(Turkey) TUR	Fatih Sonkaya	7	0	5	0	1	0	1	0
33	DF	(Portugal) POR	Miguel Areias	0	0	0	0	0	0	0	0
44	DF	(Portugal) POR	João Pedro	0	0	0	0	0	0	0	0
88	DF	(Brazil) BRA	Leandro	0	0	0	0	0	0	0	0
Midfielders
6	MF	(Brazil) BRA	Ibson	24	1	18	1	4	0	2	0
7	MF	(Portugal) POR	Ricardo Quaresma	39	5	29	5	4	0	6	0
8	MF	(Argentina) ARG	Lucho González	40	12	30	10	4	1	6	1
16	MF	(Portugal) POR	Raul Meireles	22	2	18	2	3	0	1	0
18	MF	(Brazil) BRA	Paulo Assunção	33	0	25	0	4	0	4	0
20	MF	(Brazil) BRA	Diego	24	3	18	1	2	1	4	1
30	MF	(Brazil) BRA	Anderson	5	0	3	0	2	0	0	0
37	MF	(Portugal) POR	Hélder Barbosa	1	0	1	0	0	0	0	0
32	MF	(Brazil) BRA	Leandro Bonfim	0	0	0	0	0	0	0	0
41	MF	(Brazil) BRA	Léo Lima	0	0	0	0	0	0	0	0
55	MF	(Cape Verde) CPV	Sandro	0	0	0	0	0	0	0	0
66	MF	(Portugal) POR	Nuno Coelho	0	0	0	0	0	0	0	0
Forwards
9	FW	(South Africa) RSA	Benni McCarthy	31	7	23	3	4	3	4	1
10	FW	(Portugal) POR	Hélder Postiga	2	0	2	0	0	0	0	0
11	FW	(Argentina) ARG	Lisandro López	30	8	26	7	2	0	2	1
17	FW	(Brazil) BRA	Jorginho	36	4	28	4	2	0	6	0
19	FW	(Croatia) CRO	Tomo Šokota	3	0	2	0	0	0	1	0
25	FW	(Portugal) POR	Ivanildo	16	1	14	0	1	1	1	0
27	FW	(Brazil) BRA	Alan	31	1	24	1	3	0	4	0
28	FW	(Brazil) BRA	Adriano	18	8	15	7	3	1	0	0
29	FW	(Portugal) POR	Hugo Almeida	37	4	27	3	4	0	6	1
39	FW	(Brazil) BRA	Bruno Moraes	0	0	0	0	0	0	0	0
40	FW	(Portugal) POR	Bruno Gama	0	0	0	0	0	0	0	0

=== Transfers ===
==== In ====
No.	Pos.	Nat.	Name	Age	EU	Moving from	Type	Transfer window	Ends	Transfer fee	Source
1	GK	(Brazil)	Helton	27	Non-EU	União de Leiria (Portugal)	Transfer	Summer		€1.5M	Record.pt
8	MF	(Argentina)	Lucho González	24	Non-EU	River Plate (Argentina)	Transfer	Summer	2010	€3.6M	UEFA.com
11	FW	(Argentina)	Lisandro López	22	Non-EU	Racing Santander (Spain)	Transfer	Summer	2009	€2.35M	Record.pt
13	DF	(Portugal)	Bruno Alves	23	EU	AEK Athens (Greece)	Loan Return	Summer			
17	FW	(Brazil)	Jorginho	28	Non-EU	Vitória de Setúbal	Transfer	Summer		Undisclosed Fee	
18	MF	(Brazil)	Paulo Assunção	25	Non-EU	AEK Athens (Greece)	Loan Return	Summer			
19	DF	(Croatia)	Tomo Šokota	28	Non-EU	Benfica	Transfer	Summer	2011	Free	Record.pt
21	DF	(Portugal)	César Peixoto	25	EU	Vitória de Guimarães	Loan Return	Summer			
22	DF	(Turkey)	Fatih Sonkaya	24	Non-EU	Beşiktaş (Turkey)	Transfer	Summer		€1.5 M	Record.pt
27	FW	(Brazil)	Alan	25	Non-EU	Marítimo	Transfer	Summer		Undisclosed Fee	Record.pt
28	FW	(Brazil)	Adriano	27	Non-EU	Cruzeiro (Brazil)	Loan	Winter	2006		Record.pt
29	FW	(Brazil)	Bruno Moraes	25	Non-EU	Vitória de Setúbal	Loan Return	Summer	2008		
30	FW	(Brazil)	Anderson	17	Non-EU	Grêmio (Brazil)	Transfer	Winter		€7M	UEFA.com
35	DF	(Slovakia)	Marek Čech	22	EU	Sparta Prague (Czech Republic)	Transfer	Summer	2009	Undisclosed Fee	Record.pt
39	FW	(Portugal)	Hugo Almeida	25	EU	Boavista	Loan Return	Summer			
	MF	(Cape Verde)	Sandro	28	Non-EU	Vitória de Setúbal	Transfer	Summer	2008	Undisclosed Fee	Record.pt
	DF	(Brazil)	Leandro	26	Non-EU	Cruzeiro (Brazil)	Loan Return	Summer			
	MF	(Brazil)	Leandro Bonfim	21	Non-EU	PSV (Netherlands)	Transfer	Summer			
	MF	(Brazil)	Léo Lima	23	Non-EU	Santos (Brazil)	Transfer	Summer			Record.pt

==== Out ====
No.	Pos.	Nat.	Name	Age	EU	Moving to	Type	Transfer window	Transfer fee	Source
2	DF	(Portugal)	Jorge Costa	33	EU	Standard Liège (Belgium)	Transfer	Summer	Free	
15	DF	(Portugal)	Nuno Valente	30	EU	Everton (England)	Transfer	Summer	€2.2 M	UEFA.com
	GK	(Portugal)	Paulo Santos	32	EU	Braga	Transfer	Summer		
	MF	(Portugal)	Manuel José	24	EU	Boavista	Transfer	Summer		
	FW	(Portugal)	António Alves	23	EU	Tourizense	Transfer	Summer		
	MF	(Portugal)	André Vilas Boas	22	EU	Rio Ave	Loan Finished	Summer		Record.pt
	MF	(Argentina)	Maximiliano Asís	18	Non-EU	Boca Juniors (Argentina)	Transfer	Summer		
	DF	(Portugal)	Miguel Areias	28	EU	Boavista	Loan	Summer		Record.pt
	FW	(Brazil)	Maciel	26	Non-EU	União de Leiria	Loan	Summer		Record.pt
	MF	(Cape Verde)	Sandro	28	Non-EU	Manisaspor (Turkey)	Loan	Summer		
	GK	(Portugal)	Bruno Vale	22	EU	Estrela da Amadora	Loan	Summer		Record.pt
	MF	(Portugal)	Paulo Machado	19	EU	Estrela da Amadora	Loan	Summer		Record.pt
	MF	(Brazil)	Leandro Bonfim	21	Non-EU	Cruzeiro (Brazil)	Loan	Summer		
	MF	(Brazil)	Pitbull	23	Non-EU	Al-Ittihad (Saudi Arabia)	Loan	Summer		Record.pt
	FW	(Brazil)	Luís Fabiano	24	Non-EU	Sevilla (Spain)	Loan	Summer	€1.2 M	
	MF	(Portugal)	Pedro Oliveira	23	EU	Vitória de Setúbal	Transfer	Summer		
	MF	(Portugal)	Sérgio Organista	21	EU	Pontevedra (Spain)	Loan	Summer		
	FW	(Portugal)	Vítor Silva	23	EU	Santa Clara	Transfer	Summer		
	GK	(Portugal)	Rui Sacramento	20	EU	Valdevez	Loan	Summer		
	FW	(Brazil)	Cleberson	21	Non-EU	União São João (Brazil)	Transfer	Summer		
	DF	(Portugal)	Vítor Rodrigues	22	EU	União da Madeira	Transfer	Summer		
	DF	(Cameroon)	Joel N'Gako	19	Non-EU	Belasitsa Petrich (Bulgaria)	Transfer	Summer		
	FW	(Cape Verde)	José Furtado	22	Non-EU	Vihren Sandanski (Bulgaria)	Loan	Summer		
	FW	(Argentina)	Gonzalo Marronkle	20	Non-EU	Marco	Transfer	Summer		
	MF	(Portugal)	Cristóvão	22	EU	Penafiel	Loan	Summer		
	MF	(Portugal)	Pedro Nuno	23	EU	Maia	Transfer	Summer		
	MF	(Portugal)	Fausto Lourenço	18	EU	Académica	Transfer	Summer		
	GK	(Portugal)	Vasco Viana	20	EU	Lixa	Transfer	Summer		
	MF	(Portugal)	Márcio Sousa	19	EU	Sporting Covilhã	Loan	Summer		
	DF	(Portugal)	Raviola	21	EU	Joane	Loan	Summer		
	FW	(Portugal)	Tiago André	21	EU	Fafe	Transfer	Summer		
	DF	(Portugal)	Sandro	22	EU	Tourizense	Transfer	Summer		
	DF	(Portugal)	Diogo Ramos	18	EU	Freamunde	Transfer	Summer		
	MF	(Brazil)	Diogo Gomes	19	EU	Coritiba (Brazil)	Transfer	Summer		
	DF	(Portugal)	Pedro Silva	20	EU	Tourizense	Transfer	Summer		
	DF	(Portugal)	Tiago Costa	18	EU	Candal	Transfer	Summer		
	FW	(Brazil)	Pedro Dennis	18	EU	Maia	Transfer	Summer		
	MF	(Angola)	Danilson	18	Non-EU	Padroense	Transfer	Summer		
	FW	(Portugal)	Pedro Saianda	17	EU	Barreirense	Transfer	Summer		
	DF	(Portugal)	Pedro Ribeiro	23	EU	Marco	Loan	Winter		
	MF	(Brazil)	Pitbull	24	Non-EU	Santos (Brazil)	Loan	Winter		
	MF	(Brazil)	Pitbull	24	Non-EU	Fluminense (Brazil)	Loan	Winter		Record.pt
	MF	(Portugal)	Cristóvão	22	EU	Leixões	Loan	Winter		
	MF	(Cape Verde)	Sandro	28	Non-EU	Vitória de Setúbal	Loan	Winter		Record.pt
	MF	(Brazil)	Vinícius	19	Non-EU	Paulista	Transfer	Winter		
10	FW	(Portugal)	Hélder Postiga	23	EU	Saint-Étienne (France)	Loan	Winter		Record.pt
	FW	(Cape Verde)	José Furtado	22	Non-EU	CSKA Sofia (Bulgaria)	Transfer	Winter		
	FW	(Portugal)	Vieirinha	19	EU	Marco	Loan	Winter		
	DF	(Portugal)	Nuno André Coelho	20	EU	Maia	Loan	Winter		
	MF	(Brazil)	Léo Lima	23	Non-EU	Santos	Transfer	Winter		
	DF	(Brazil)	Leandro	26	Non-EU	Santos	Loan	Winter		

== Club ==
=== Coaching staff ===
Position	Staff
Manager	(Netherlands) Co Adriaanse
Assistant Manager	(Portugal) Rui Barros
Goalkeeper Coach	(Netherlands) Wil Coort
Physio	(Portugal) António Dias
Scout	(Portugal) João Pinto
Doctor	(Portugal) Nélson Puga

== Competitions ==
=== Legend ===
Win Draw Loss

=== Primeira Liga ===
==== League table ====
Pos	Team	Pld	W	D	L	GF	GA	GD	Pts	Qualification or relegation
1	Porto (C)	34	24	7	3	54	16	+38	79	Qualification to Champions League group stage
2	Sporting CP	34	22	6	6	50	24	+26	72	Qualification to Champions League group stage
3	Benfica	34	20	7	7	51	29	+22	67	Qualification to Champions League third qualifying round
4	Braga	34	17	7	10	38	22	+16	58	Qualification to UEFA Cup first round
5	Nacional	34	14	10	10	40	32	+8	52	Qualification to UEFA Cup first round

Source: Foradejogo
Rules for classification: 1) points; 2) head-to-head points; 3) head-to-head goal difference; 4) goal difference; 5) number of goals scored
(C) Champions

==== Results summary ====
Overall								Home						Away					
Pld	W	D	L	GF	GA	GD	Pts	W	D	L	GF	GA	GD	W	D	L	GF	GA	GD
34	24	7	3	54	16	+38	79	13	3	1	32	7	+25	11	4	2	22	9	+13

Last updated: 14 May 2011.

==== Results by round ====
Round	1	2	3	4	5	6	7	8	9	10	11	12	13	14	15	16	17	18	19	20	21	22	23	24	25	26	27	28	29	30	31	32	33	34
Ground	H	A	H	A	H	A	H	A	H	A	H	A	H	A	H	A	H	A	H	A	H	A	H	A	H	A	H	A	H	A	H	A	H	A
Result	W	W	W	D	W	D	L	W	D	W	W	W	D	W	W	W	W	L	W	D	D	W	W	L	W	W	W	W	W	W	W	W	W	D
Position	7	4	1	1	1	1	3	2	2	2	2	1	1	1	1	1	1	1	1	1	1	1	1	1	1	1	1	1	1	1	1	1	1	1

Updated to match(es) played on 15 April. Source:
A = Away; H = Home; W = Win; D = Draw; L = Loss

==== Matches ====
21 August 2005 1	Porto	1 – 0	Estrela da Amadora	Porto
19:45 GMT	R. Costa 57'			Stadium: Estádio do Dragão; Attendance: 48,217; Referee: João Vilas Boas

26 August 2005 2	Naval	2 – 3	Porto	Figueira da Foz
21:30 GMT	Fogaça 55'; Peixoto 85' (o.g.)		Peixoto 45', 53'; Almeida 82'	Stadium: Estádio Municipal José Bento Pessoa; Referee: Lucílio Baptista

10 September 2005 3	Porto	3 – 0	Rio Ave	Porto
19:30 GMT	Quaresma 87'; Alan 90+3'; Almeida 90+4'			Stadium: Estádio do Dragão; Attendance: 38,421; Referee: Elmano Santos

18 September 2005 4	Braga	0 – 0	Porto	Braga
21:15 GMT				Stadium: Estádio Municipal de Braga; Referee: António Costa

24 September 2005 5	Porto	2 – 0	Belenenses	Porto
21:15 GMT	McCarthy 18'; Jorginho 56'			Stadium: Estádio do Dragão; Attendance: 41,109; Referee: Bruno Paixão

2 October 2005 6	Marítimo	2 – 2	Porto	Funchal
19:15 GMT	Manduca 7'; Marcinho 86'		López 74'; Peixoto 76'	Stadium: Estádio dos Barreiros; Referee: Duarte Gomes

15 October 2005 7	Porto	0 – 2	Benfica	Porto
21:00 GMT			Nuno Gomes 55', 63'	Stadium: Estádio do Dragão; Attendance: 50,109; Referee: Lucílio Baptista

23 October 2005 8	Nacional	0 – 1	Porto	Funchal
21:15 GMT			Almeida 47'	Stadium: Estádio da Madeira; Referee: Hélio Santos

29 October 2005 9	Porto	0 – 0	Vitória de Setúbal	Porto
19:15 GMT				Stadium: Estádio do Dragão; Attendance: 29,316; Referee: António Resende

6 November 2005 10	Paços de Ferreira	0 – 1	Porto	Paços de Ferreira
21:15 GMT			Quaresma 11'	Stadium: Estádio da Mata Real; Referee: Pedro Proença

19 November 2005 11	Porto	5 – 1	Académica	Porto
21:15 GMT	González 10', 89'; López 19', 17'; Peixoto 71'		Marcel 90+4'	Stadium: Estádio do Dragão; Attendance: 30,108; Referee: Carlos Xistra

28 November 2005 12	Gil Vicente	0 – 1	Porto	Barcelos
20:30 GMT			González 1'	Stadium: Estádio Cidade de Barcelos; Attendance: 4,112; Referee: António Costa

2 December 2005 13	Porto	1 – 1	Sporting CP	Porto
21:00 GMT	Jorginho 66'		Deivid 48'	Stadium: Estádio do Dragão; Attendance: 46,111; Referee: Lucílio Baptista

10 December 2005 14	União de Leiria	1 – 3	Porto	Leiria
21:15 GMT	Felício 35'		Laranjeiro 40' (o.g.); López 42'; Diego 90+1'	Stadium: Estádio Dr. Magalhães Pessoa; Attendance: 4,337; Referee: Pedro Henriques

17 December 2005 15	Porto	3 – 1	Penafiel	Porto
21:15 GMT	González 39', 44' (pen.); López 54'		Amaro 1'	Stadium: Estádio do Dragão; Attendance: 30,108; Referee: Artur Soares Dias

22 December 2005 16	Vitória de Guimarães	0 – 2	Porto	Guimarães
21:30 GMT			Quaresma 21'; Jorginho 58'	Stadium: Estádio D. Afonso Henriques; Attendance: 18,173; Referee: Paulo Baptista

8 January 2006 17	Porto	1 – 0	Boavista	Porto
20:45 GMT	Quaresma 22'			Stadium: Estádio do Dragão; Attendance: 41,207; Referee: Paulo Costa

15 January 2006 18	Estrela da Amadora	2 – 1	Porto	Amadora
20:45 GMT	Maurício 17'; Coutinho 33'		González 60'	Stadium: Estádio José Gomes; Referee: Olegário Benquerença

21 January 2006 19	Porto	1 – 0	Naval	Porto
21:15 GMT	Fernando 30' (o.g.)			Stadium: Estádio do Dragão; Attendance: 32,128; Referee: João Vilas Boas

29 January 2006 20	Rio Ave	0 – 0	Porto	Vila do Conde
19:15 GMT				Stadium: Estádio do Rio Ave FC; Referee: Duarte Gomes

6 February 2006 21	Porto	1 – 1	Braga	Porto
20:30 GMT	González 55'		Tomás 88' (pen.)	Stadium: Estádio do Dragão; Attendance: 39,409; Referee: Bruno Paixão

11 February 2006 22	Belenenses	0 – 2	Porto	Lisbon
21:30 GMT			Adriano 43', 52'	Stadium: Estádio do Restelo; Referee: Elmano Santos

19 February 2006 23	Porto	1 – 0	Marítimo	Porto
18:30 GMT	Meireles 21'			Stadium: Estádio do Dragão; Attendance: 31,116; Referee: Carlos Xistra

26 February 2006 24	Benfica	1 – 0	Porto	Lisbon
19:45 GMT	Robert 39'			Stadium: Estádio da Luz; Attendance: 57,787; Referee: João Ferreira

5 March 2006 25	Porto	3 – 0	Nacional	Porto
18:30 GMT	McCarthy 17'; Pepe 44'; González 50'			Stadium: Estádio do Dragão; Attendance: 33,909; Referee: Paulo Pereira

10 March 2006 26	Vitória de Setúbal	0 – 2	Porto	Setúbal
21:30 GMT	Adriano 40'; Meireles 50'			Stadium: Estádio do Bonfim; Referee: Pedro Henriques

18 March 2006 27	Porto	3 – 0	Paços de Ferreira	Porto
21:30 GMT	McCarthy 30'; Adriano 46'; López 74'			Stadium: Estádio do Dragão; Attendance: 30,309; Referee: Hélio Santos

26 March 2006 28	Académica	0 – 1	Porto	Coimbra
18:30 GMT			Almeida 71'	Stadium: Estádio Cidade de Coimbra; Attendance: 13,069; Referee: António Costa

2 April 2006 29	Porto	3 – 0	Gil Vicente	Porto
20:15 GMT	Čech 45'; Quaresma 78'; Ibson 86'			Stadium: Estádio do Dragão; Attendance: 40,335; Referee: Paulo Baptista

8 April 2006 30	Sporting CP	0 – 1	Porto	Lisbon
20:45 GMT			Jorginho 84'	Stadium: Estádio José Alvalade; Attendance: 48,018; Referee: Duarte Gomes

14 April 2006 31	Porto	1 – 0	União de Leiria	Porto
19:45 GMT	Adriano 43'			Stadium: Estádio do Dragão; Attendance: 45,828; Referee: Elmano Santos

22 April 2006 32	Penafiel	0 – 1	Porto	Penafiel
19:15 GMT			Adriano 47' (pen.)	Stadium: Estádio Municipal 25 de Abril; Attendance: 45,828; Referee: Augusto Duarte

30 April 2006 33	Porto	3 – 1	Vitória de Guimarães	Porto
18:30 GMT	González 58', 87'; Adriano 90+3'		Antchouet 84'	Stadium: Estádio do Dragão; Attendance: 49,809; Referee: Hélio Santos

6 May 2006 34	Boavista	1 – 1	Porto	Porto
18:00 GMT	Paulo Jorge 71'		López 21'	Stadium: Estádio do Bessa; Referee: Pedro Henriques

=== Taça de Portugal ===
==== Matches ====
26 October 2005 4	Porto	1 – 0	Marco	Estádio do Dragão, Porto
	Ivanildo 28'			Attendance: 18,425; Referee: João Vilas Boas

11 January 2006 5	Naval	1 – 2	Porto	Estádio Municipal José Bento Pessoa, Figueira da Foz
20:45	Saulo 47' (pen.)		Diego 60'; González 78' (pen.)	Referee: Bruno Paixão

15 March 2006 QF	Marítimo	1 – 2 (a.e.t.)	Porto	Estádio dos Barreiros, Funchal
18:30	Kanú 33' (pen.)		McCarthy 22', 96'	Referee: Lucílio Baptista

22 March 2006 SF	Porto	1 – 1 (a.e.t.) (5–4 p)	Sporting CP	Estádio do Dragão, Porto
20:45	McCarthy 115'		Liédson 108'	Attendance: 48,416; Referee: Olegário Benquerença
	Penalties
	González (penalty scored); McCarthy (penalty scored); R. Costa (penalty scored); Assunção (penalty scored); López (penalty scored)		(penalty missed) Moutinho; (penalty scored) Custódio; (penalty scored) Deivid; (penalty scored) Tello; (penalty scored) Ricardo

14 May 2006 F	Porto	1 – 0	Vitória de Setúbal	Estádio Nacional, Oeiras
17:00	Adriano 39'			Attendance: 38,000; Referee: Duarte Gomes

=== UEFA Champions League ===
==== Group stage ====
Pos	Team	Pld	W	D	L	GF	GA	GD	Pts	Qualification
1	(Italy) Internazionale	6	4	1	1	9	4	+5	13	Advance to knockout stage
2	(Scotland) Rangers	6	1	4	1	7	7	0	7	Advance to knockout stage
3	(Slovakia) Artmedia Bratislava	6	1	3	2	5	9	−4	6	Transfer to UEFA Cup
4	(Portugal) Porto	6	1	2	3	8	9	−1	5	

Source: RSSSF

13 September 2005 1	Rangers	3 – 2	Porto	Ibrox Stadium, Glasgow
19:45 (UTC)	Løvenkrands 35'; Pršo 59'; Kyrgiakos 85'		Pepe 47', 71'	Attendance: 48,600; Referee: Jan Wegereef (Netherlands)

28 September 2005 2	Porto	2 – 3	Artmedia Bratislava	Estádio do Dragão, Porto
19:45 (UTC)	González 32'; Diego 39'		Petráš 45+1'; Ján Kozák 54'; Borbély 74'	Attendance: 35,000; Referee: Massimo Busacca (Switzerland)

19 October 2005 3	Porto	2 – 0	Inter Milan	Estádio do Dragão, Porto
19:45 (UTC)	Materazzi 22' (o.g.); McCarthy 35'			Attendance: 50,000; Referee: Massimo Busacca (Switzerland)

1 November 2005 4	Inter Milan	2 – 1	Porto	San Siro, Milan
19:45 (UTC)	Cruz 75' (pen.), 82'		Almeida 16'	Attendance: 0 Referee: Manuel Mejuto González (Spain)

23 November 2005 5	Porto	1 – 1	Rangers	Estádio do Dragão, Porto
19:45 (UTC)	López 60'		McCormack 83'	Attendance: 50,000; Referee: Herbert Fandel (Germany)

6 December 2005 6	Artmedia Bratislava	0 – 0	Porto	Tehelné pole, Bratislava
19:45 (UTC)				Attendance: 25,000; Referee: Markus Merk (Germany)
