= 2005 Taça de Portugal final =

- Event: 2004–05 Taça de Portugal
Benfica	Vitória de Setúbal
1	2
- Date: 29 May 2005
- Venue: Estádio Nacional, Oeiras
- Man of the Match: Sandro (Vitória de Setúbal)
- Referee: Paulo Costa (Porto)
- Attendance: 38,000

The 2005 Taça de Portugal final was the final match of the 2004–05 Taça de Portugal, the 65th season of the Taça de Portugal, the premier Portuguese football cup competition organized by the Portuguese Football Federation (FPF). The match was played on 26 May 2013 at the Estádio Nacional in Oeiras, between Benfica and Vitória de Setúbal. Vitória defeated Benfica 2–1 and secured their third title in the competition after winning the competition in the 1964–65 and 1966–67 seasons.

As a result of winning the Taça de Portugal, Vitória de Setúbal qualified for the 2005–06 UEFA Cup first round. Vitória de Setúbal would also qualify for the 2005 Supertaça Cândido de Oliveira where they met their cup final opponents.

== Background ==
Benfica were appearing in their 33rd Taça de Portugal final. Benfica went into the match as the 24-time winners (1940, 1943, 1944, 1949, 1951, 1952, 1953, 1955, 1957, 1959, 1962, 1964, 1969, 1970, 1972, 1980, 1981, 1983, 1985, 1986, 1987, 1993, 1996, 2004). Of their 33 Taça de Portugal final appearances, they had lost eight times (1939, 1958, 1965, 1971, 1974, 1975, 1989, 1997). Benfica's last Taça de Portugal final appearance was in 2004 against Porto, where the Encarnados defeated the Dragões 2–1. Vitória de Setúbal were appearing in their ninth Taça de Portugal final. They had previously won two (1965, 1967) and lost six (1943, 1954, 1962, 1966, 1968, 1973). Vitória de Setúbal's last Taça de Portugal final appearance was in 1973 against Sporting CP, where the Leões defeated the Sadinos 3–2.

In Benfica's and Vitória de Setúbal's entire history, the two teams had met on 147 occasions prior to this encounter. Benfica had accumulated 98 victories whilst Vitória de Setúbal had accumulated twenty eight victories. Of those 147 encounters, 24 games had ended in a draw. The last meeting between these two sides in this competition was a fifth-round match in the 1998–99 season, where Vitória de Setúbal defeated Benfica at the Estádio do Bonfim 2–0. The last meeting between these two sides, prior to this encounter was a domestic league match, which took place on the 19 of March. Benfica defeated their opponents 2–0, with goals from Geovanni and Manuel Fernandes.

== Route to the final ==
=== Benfica ===
Round	Opponents	Score
4	Oriental (H)	3–1
5	AD Oliveirense (H)	4–1 (aet)
6	Sporting CP (H)	3–3 (aet), 7–6 p
QF	Beira-Mar (H)	1–0
SF	Estrela da Amadora (A)	3–0

As a Primeira Liga team, Benfica entered the 2004–05 Taça de Portugal in the fourth round, where they were drawn in a home tie against Portuguese Second Division side Oriental. Benfica defeated their opposition 3–1, thanks to a brace from Croatian striker Tomo Šokota and goal from Brazilian midfield ace Geovanni on the hour mark. The fifth round saw the Encarnados be pitted in another tie at the Estádio da Luz against Terceira Divisão side AD Oliveirense. The fourth tier side threatened an upset when Pedro Fidalgo scored in the 25th minute. However, in the second half, Benfica were awarded a penalty which Simão Sabrosa converted to tie the game in the 50th minute. The score remained tied until the end of the game. The 1–1 tie after 90 minutes would require extra-time to settle a winner of the match. As Benfica piled on the pressure in extra-time, they took the lead for the first time in the match after Cristiano Hummel scored an own goal in the 95th minute. Following Benfica's second, the visitors then pushed for an equaliser, which would allow Benfica to brake and open the floodgates for Benfica's third and fourth goals. Tomo Šokota would score Benfica's third and Geovanni Benfica's fourth to make the final score 4–1.

In the sixth round, Benfica were again at home, and faced rivals Sporting CP. The first twenty two minutes of the game saw four goals. Geovanni would open the scoring on three minutes, with the Leões equalising on 15 minutes through Hugo Viana. Sporting CP would take the lead two minutes after Viana had equalised, through striker Liédson. Geovanni would double Benfica's tally to tie the game 2–2. The lively first half saw both teams not replicate their goal scoring form in the second half which led to both teams taking more precautions and less risks when going forward. This resulted in the game being tied after 90 minutes. The stalemate after 90 minutes required extra-time to settle a winner of the tie. Sporting's left back Paíto would give the Leões the lead in the 110th minute, after he picked up the ball in his own half and ran past Benfica's João Pereira and Luisão on the wing and slotted the ball past an on rushing Quim. Two minutes from the end of extra-time, Simão Sabrosa was played the ball outside the penalty box and curled the shot past Ricardo to tie the game and thus allow the tie to be settled in a penalty shootout. After each side had taken six penalties each, the score was tied 6–6. Benfica's Alcides would convert his penalty whilst Sporting's Miguel Garcia missed and thus granted Benfica passage to the next round.

For the quarter-finals, Benfica were drawn in a fourth consecutive home cup tie against fellow first division side Beira-Mar. A first half strike from full-back João Pereira saw Benfica qualify for the semi-finals. Benfica's quarter final win over Beira-Mar would mark the first clean sheet that Benfica had obtained in the 2004–05 Taça de Portugal. For the semi-finals, Benfica were drawn away from home against Estrela da Amadora who at the time were the only second division side still in the competition. Benfica defeated the Amadora side 3–0, with a brace from Nuno Gomes and a second half strike from Nuno Assis which would give Benfica a ticket to the cup final for a consecutive season.

== Match ==
=== Details ===
29 May 2005
17:00 UTC

Benfica	1–2	Vitória de Setúbal
Simão 4' (pen.)		Manuel José 26'; Meyong 72'

Estádio Nacional, Oeiras
Attendance: 38,000
Referee: Paulo Costa (Porto)

Benfica	Vitória de Setúbal

GK	1	(Portugal) José Moreira
RB	23	(Portugal) Miguel
CB	13	(Brazil) Alcides
CB	33	(Portugal) Ricardo Rocha
LB	14	(Greece) Takis Fyssas		(substituted off) 54'
CM	6	(Portugal) Petit
CM	37	(Portugal) Manuel Fernandes
RM	11	(Brazil) Geovanni
AM	15	(Portugal) Nuno Assis		(substituted off) 74'
LM	20	(Portugal) Simão (c)
CF	21	(Portugal) Nuno Gomes		(substituted off) 85'
Substitutes:
GK	12	(Portugal) Quim
DF	18	(France) Manuel dos Santos		(substituted on) 54'
DF	30	(Brazil) André Luís
DF	47	(Portugal) João Pereira
MF	8	(Portugal) Bruno Aguiar
FW	9	(Angola) Mantorras	(yellow card) 88'	(substituted on) 74'
FW	34	(Serbia and Montenegro) Andrija Delibašić	(yellow card) 90'	(substituted on) 85'
Manager:
(Italy) Giovanni Trapattoni

GK	1	(Brazil) Marcelo Moretto	(yellow card) 3'
RB	4	(Brazil) Éder Bonfim
CB	15	(Brazil) Auri
CB	5	(Brazil) Hugo Alcântara	(yellow card) 55'
LB	19	(Portugal) Nandinho
CM	3	(Portugal) Ricardo Chaves
CM	6	(Cape Verde) Sandro (c)
RM	7	(Portugal) Manuel José		(substituted off) 78'
AM	10	(Brazil) Jorginho	(yellow card) 60'
LM	11	(Portugal) Bruno Ribeiro
CF	21	(Cameroon) Albert Meyong		(substituted off) 88'
Substitutes:
GK	12	(Portugal) Marco Tábuas
DF	23	(Portugal) Veríssimo
MF	8	(Portugal) Hélio Sousa
MF	16	(Cape Verde) Zé Rui
MF	50	(Brazil) Binho		(substituted on) 78'
FW	18	(Brazil) Igor		(substituted on) 88'
FW	27	(Portugal) Pedro Oliveira
Manager:
(Portugal) José Rachão

2004–05 Taça de Portugal Winners
Vitória de Setúbal
3rd Title

Man of the match

- (Cape Verde) Sandro (Vitória de Setúbal)

Match officials

- Assistant referees:
- Fourth official:

Match rules

- 90 minutes
- Penalty shoot-out if scores level after 90 minutes
- Seven named substitutes
- Maximum of three substitutions

== See also ==
- 2004–05 S.L. Benfica season
