= Raul Meireles =

Portuguese footballer (born 1983)

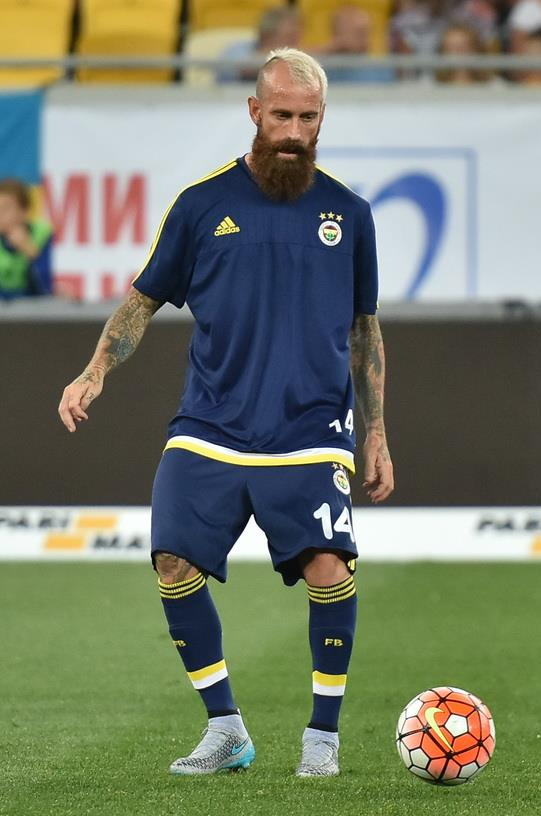
- Meireles with Fenerbahçe in 2015

Personal information
- Full name: Raul José Trindade Meireles
- Date of birth: 17 March 1983 (age 43)
- Place of birth: Porto, Portugal
- Height: 1.79 m (5 ft 10 in)
- Position: Midfielder

Youth career
- 1990–2001: Boavista

Senior career*
Years	Team	Apps	(Gls)
2001–2004	Boavista	29	(0)
2001–2003	→ Aves (loan)	44	(1)
2004–2010	Porto	137	(15)
2010–2011	Liverpool	35	(5)
2011–2012	Chelsea	31	(2)
2012–2016	Fenerbahçe	76	(6)
Total		352	(29)

International career
2000	Portugal U16	11	(0)
2000	Portugal U17	7	(1)
2001–2002	Portugal U18	13	(1)
2003	Portugal U20	8	(0)
2003–2006	Portugal U21	26	(2)
2004	Portugal U23	4	(0)
2004–2006	Portugal B	5	(0)
2006–2014	Portugal	76	(10)
Medal record
Men's football
Representing Portugal
UEFA European Championship
Bronze medal – third place	2012 Poland-Ukraine
UEFA European Under-21 Championship
Third place	2004 Germany
UEFA European Under-17 Championship
Winner	2000 Israel
- * Club domestic league appearances and goals

Raul José Trindade Meireles (Portuguese pronunciation: [ʁɐˈul mɐjˈɾɛlɨʃ]; born 17 March 1983) is a Portuguese former professional footballer who played as a midfielder.

After starting out at Boavista, he signed with Porto in 2004, going on to appear in 198 official games and win ten major trophies, including four Primeira Liga titles in a row. From 2010 to 2012, he competed in the Premier League with Liverpool and Chelsea, winning the 2012 Champions League with the latter. He also spent several seasons in Turkey with Fenerbahçe.

A Portugal international since 2006, Meireles represented the country in two World Cups and two European Championships, earning a total of 73 caps and scoring ten goals. He also played Olympic football in 2004.

== Club career ==
=== Boavista ===
Meireles was born in Porto, and joined local Boavista's youth system at the age of seven. He spent two years on loan to Aves in the Segunda Liga, being presented on 8 July 2001.

Meireles scored his first senior goal on 25 May 2003, in a 2–1 home win over União da Madeira where he fired from 30 metres into the net. He finished that season with 26 appearances, helping his team to finish in sixth position.

For the 2003–04 campaign, Meireles returned to Boavista. He made his debut in the Primeira Liga on 17 August against Benfica, being chosen as Player of the match of the 0–0 home draw by newspaper Record.

=== Porto ===
On 7 July 2004, Porto signed Meireles on a five–year contract, being presented in a press conference held five days later. His first competitive match took place on 22 September against União de Leiria at the Estádio do Dragão, coming off the bench early into the first half on an eventual 1–1 league draw. On 18 February of the following year he made his first start, in an away victory over Belenenses. Five days later, he made his debut in the UEFA Champions League by featuring the full 90 minutes in a 1–1 home draw with Inter Milan in the round-of-16 first leg; he finished his first year with 15 appearances in all competitions (no goals).

Meireles started in Porto's first league fixture of 2005–06, against Estrela da Amadora, sustaining an ankle injury that sidelined him for one month. He returned to action in October, in a Taça de Portugal tie with Marco.

On 19 February 2006, Meireles scored his first goal for the Dragons in his 50th league appearance, giving a 1–0 home victory over Marítimo. He netted his second three matchdays later in a 2–0 defeat of Vitória de Setúbal, as the season ended with double conquest.

In the following four years, during which the domestic league was won three additional times, Meireles featured regularly in Porto's midfield, often partnering Fernando and Lucho González. He scored his first goal in the Champions League in the 2006–07 edition, a 1–1 last-16 home draw against Chelsea, coached by José Mourinho.

=== Liverpool ===
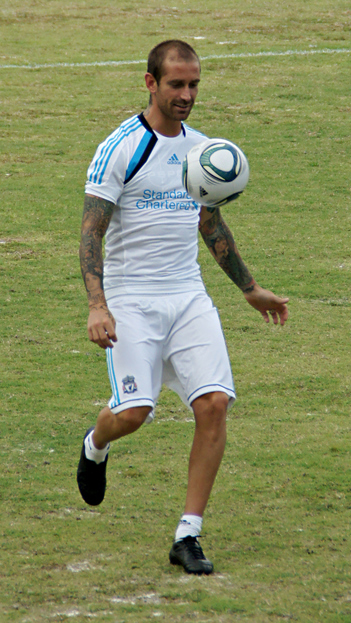
Meireles during a Liverpool pre-season training in Singapore

On 29 August 2010, Meireles moved to Liverpool for a fee of £11.5 million. He was awarded the No. 4 shirt, which was vacated by Alberto Aquilani who joined Juventus on loan. He made his Premier League debut on 12 September, playing 14 minutes in a 0–0 draw at Birmingham City, and his maiden appearance in the UEFA Europa League occurred four days later in the 4–1 group stage victory over Steaua București at Anfield where he played the entire game.

Meireles was handed his first league start on 19 September 2010, in a 3–2 away loss against Manchester United. On 16 January 2011, he scored his first goal for his new team in the 2–2 home draw with Everton, which coincided with Kenny Dalglish's first home game back as manager. His second came six days later in a 3–0 win at Wolverhampton Wanderers, when he struck a dipping 25-yard volley into the top corner of the net in the 50th minute.

On 12 February 2011, Meireles netted his fifth league goal in seven games: he put the hosts ahead midway through the first half, but Wigan Athletic eventually tied it 1–1 as Liverpool attempted to reorganise following his replacement due a stomach bug. His scoring run was rewarded with the ESPN PFA Fans' Player of the Month trophy for February, being an essential figure as the Reds climbed up the table. He finished the season with 33 matches, helping to a final sixth place and being voted the PFA Fans' Player of the Year, beating Dimitar Berbatov, David Luiz, Samir Nasri and Fernando Torres.

In the second match of the 2011–12 campaign, away against Arsenal, Meireles played 19 minutes after replacing Dirk Kuyt, and provided the assist for Luis Suárez in a 2–0 win which marked the first time they had defeated the opposition on their ground in 11 years. On 31 August, however, he asked to be transfer listed.

=== Chelsea ===
Following a long-term injury to Michael Essien, and an unsuccessful bid to acquire Luka Modrić from Tottenham Hotspur, Chelsea signed Meireles to a four-year deal on 31 August 2011, for an undisclosed fee reported to be in the region of £12 million. He chose the squad number 16, due to the fact he often wore it when on international duty; he later said he never wanted to leave Liverpool but that the chance to work with André Villas-Boas, with whom he had spent a short period of time at Porto, was too good an opportunity to turn down.

Meireles made his debut on 10 September 2011 against Sunderland, which ended in a 2–1 away win with him setting up Daniel Sturridge's goal with a long pass. In the following month, he scored his first goal for the club during a Champions League group stage 5–0 defeat of Genk. On 12 December, he netted for the first time in the domestic league to contribute to a 2–1 home victory against league leaders Manchester City also at Stamford Bridge.

On 18 March 2012, Meireles scored a goal and provided two assists to Torres, who ended his 24-game goal drought in the 5–2 home triumph against Leicester City in the quarter-finals of the FA Cup. On 4 April, he scored in the final minutes of a Champions League quarter-final 2–1 victory over Benfica, setting up a last-four tie with reigning champions Barcelona. He won his first title in English football on 5 May after a 2–1 win against his former club Liverpool in the FA Cup final where he replaced Ramires for the last 15 minutes. He was suspended for the Champions League final against Bayern Munich after being shown a yellow card against Barcelona at the Camp Nou, but still received a medal after the 4–3 victory on penalties.

=== Fenerbahçe ===
On 3 September 2012, Meireles was sold to Fenerbahçe for £8 million. He was to earn €3 million in his first season, in addition to a €10,000 per-match bonus. He scored his first goal for the Turkish club on 4 October, in a 4–2 victory at Borussia Mönchengladbach in the Europa League group stage. His first in the Süper Lig came on 25 November in the 4–1 win against Gençlerbirliği.

In December 2012, Meireles was handed an eleven-match ban by the Turkish Football Federation for spitting at a referee. The alleged actions were followed by accusations of homophobic remarks after he received a second yellow card in the second half of a 1–2 away defeat to rivals Galatasaray. However, the ban was reduced on appeal to four games after it was ruled that he could not have spat at the referee, being only guilty of verbal abuse.

Meireles scored once from 20 appearances in 2013–14, helping his team win the national championship after a three-year wait. During his spell in Istanbul, he shared teams with compatriots Bruno Alves, Nani and Vítor Pereira.

== International career ==
=== Youth ===
Meireles represented the Portuguese under-16 team at the 2000 UEFA European Championship, which was won in Israel after a 2–1 defeat of the Czech Republic. He subsequently participated in the 2001 Meridian Cup with the under-17s, starting three times in an eventual third-place finish.

In November 2001, Meireles was named in the under-19 squad for the 2003 European Championship qualifying tournament, scoring in a 1–2 loss to Belarus but helping his country qualify. On 2 June 2003, he was selected by the under-20 side for the Toulon Tournament, winning the competition and being voted its second-best player.

Meireles featured regularly in the qualifying phase for the 2004 European Under-21 Championship, including a play-off tie against France where the played the full 90 minutes in a 4–1 penalty shootout victory. He was then selected by coach José Romão for the finals, appearing in four of five games to help the country qualify for the Summer Olympics– he missed the semi-finals against Italy due to suspension; in the ensuing Olympic tournament in Athens, he started twice and appeared as a second-half substitute against Iraq, as Portugal exited in the group stage with three points.

=== Senior ===
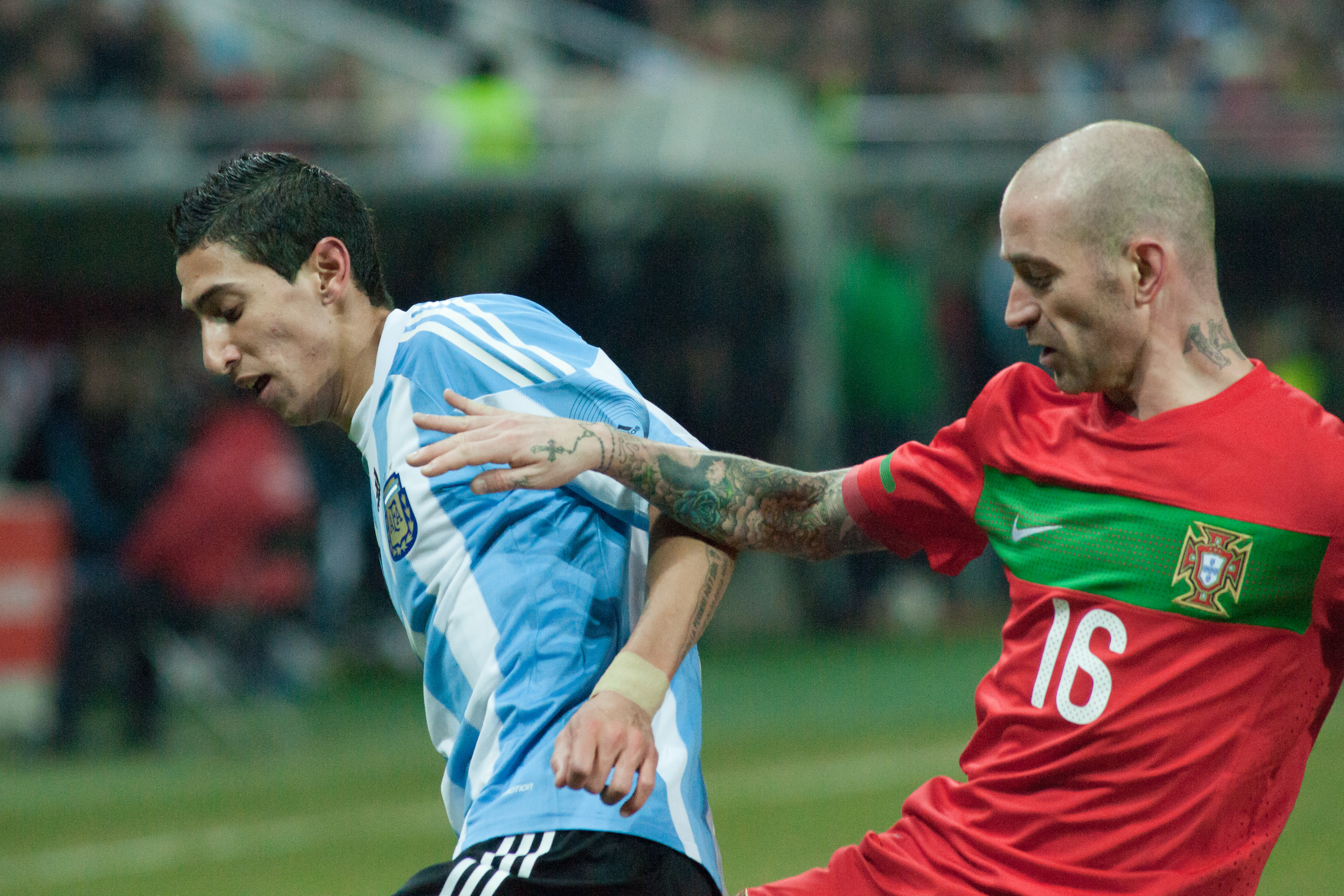
Ángel Di María (left) and Meireles (right) battle for the ball during a friendly match between Portugal and Argentina on 9 February 2011

Meireles' first game for the Portuguese senior team took place on 15 November 2006, when he played the entire 3–0 win over Kazakhstan for the UEFA Euro 2008 qualifiers. He was picked for the final stages in Austria and Switzerland, marking his debut in a major international competition with a goal in the 2–0 group stage victory against Turkey (also his first), after entering the pitch in the 83rd minute. He then started alongside several reserve players in the final group clash, a 2–0 defeat to Switzerland; four days later, he replaced João Moutinho during the first half of an eventual 3–2 quarter-final loss to Germany.

On 18 November 2009, Meireles scored an important goal in the 1–0 away victory over Bosnia and Herzegovina in the second play-off game, thus securing qualification for the 2010 FIFA World Cup. He was named in Carlos Queiroz's 23-men squad, and was a starter throughout the entire tournament, netting in the 7–0 group stage rout of North Korea in Cape Town.

Meireles also appeared for Portugal at the Euro 2012 (five starts for the semi-finalists) and 2014 World Cup (two games, group stage exit) tournaments.

== Style of play ==
Meireles could play in any position in the midfield, but preferred to operate as a central midfielder. He was capable of being deployed in both a defensive and attacking role, depending on the players available and coaches' strategies. At Porto, he was used initially as a defensive midfielder, but tactical factors saw him switch to attacking midfielder; in an opposite approach, when Paulo Bento was appointed as the Portuguese head coach in 2010, the player was eventually played in a more defensive position after starting out in attacking midfield.

Under his Liverpool manager Roy Hodgson, Meireles was also deployed as a deep-lying playmaker on occasion. A versatile, tactically astute and mobile player, his main traits were his passing and tackling, although he was also known for his work-rate and powerful long–range shooting abilities.

== Outside football ==
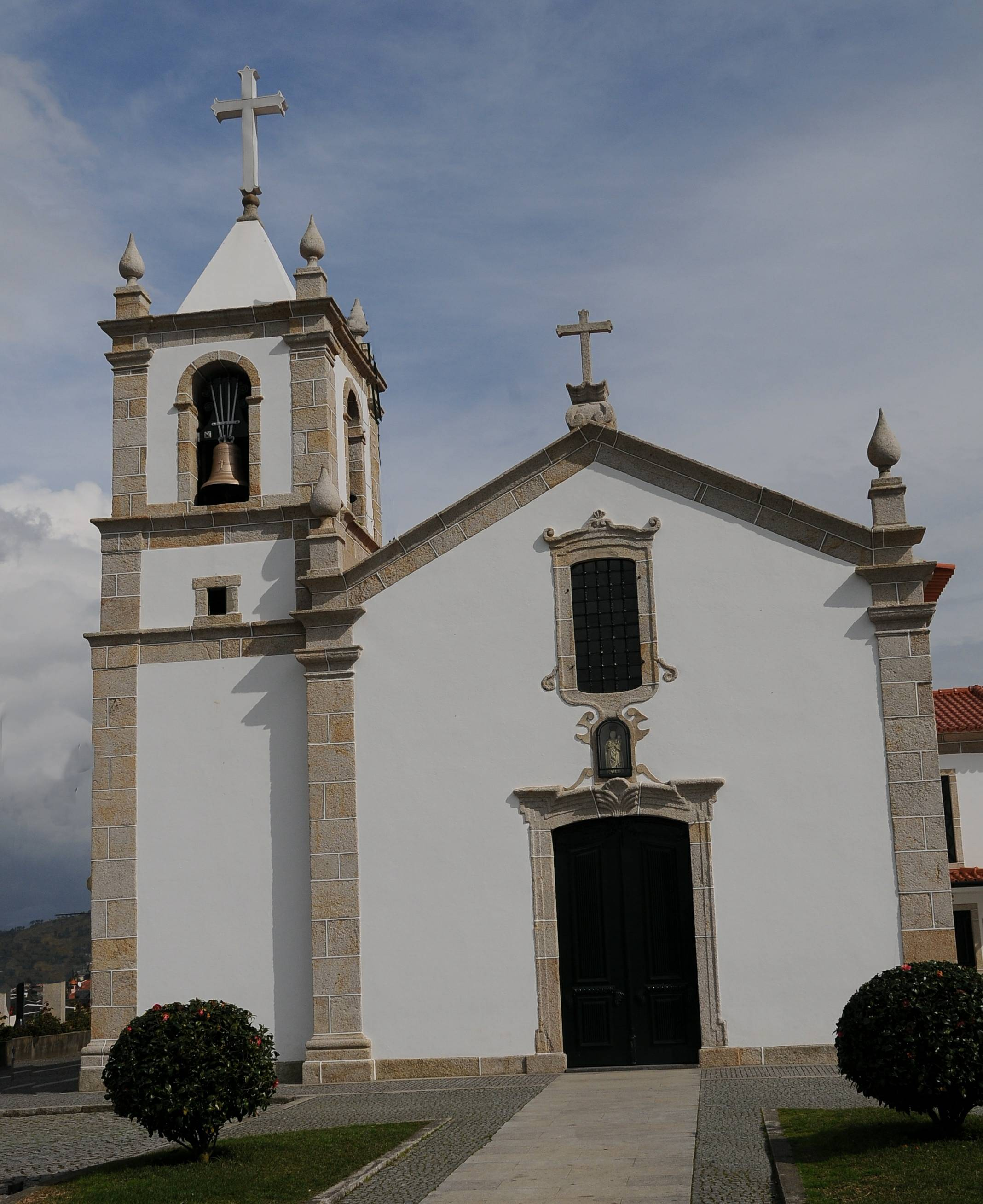
Meireles' wedding ceremony was held at Martim Church

=== Personal life ===
Meireles' father, Raul Meireles Sr., worked with Boavista as a masseur and encouraged his son to play football in that club when he was only six. In 2008 he married Ivone, with whom he had been in a relationship for several years. The couple met while he was a youth player, and their wedding ceremony was held at Martim Church in Barcelos, with several guests including Porto teammates Bruno Alves, José Bosingwa, Pedro Emanuel, Nuno Espírito Santo, Lucho González, Mariano González, Lisandro López and Pepe; the couple's clothes were designed by Fátima Lopes, and the christening of their daughter Lara was also performed there.

On 17 February 2009, the couple opened a clothes shop in Ermesinde, and Ivone declared that the idea made sense because both she and Meireles were interested in fashion. In January 2019, his rendition of António Variações' "O Corpo é que Paga" in the premiere of Lip Sync Portugal received critical acclaim.

=== Tattoos ===
Meireles was a fan of tattoos since he was 18 years old. Numerous images adorned his body, including those of Ivone and Lara. He also had a large design of a black and red Chinese-style dragon, drawn in two stages and sprawling across his back, and a huge necklace tattoo with a skull, drawn one week after his twenty-eighth birthday.

After moving to Anfield, during an interview with Liverpool's official website, Meireles jokingly said that he wanted to win the "ink championship" against teammates Daniel Agger and Martin Škrtel, due to their shared affection for tattoos.

== Career statistics ==
=== Club ===
Appearances and goals by club, season and competition
Club	Season	League			National cup		League cup		Continental		Other		Total	
Club	Season	Division	Apps	Goals	Apps	Goals	Apps	Goals	Apps	Goals	Apps	Goals	Apps	Goals
Aves (loan)	2001–02	Segunda Liga	18	0	0	0	—		—		—		18	0
Aves (loan)	2002–03	Segunda Liga	26	1	0	0	—		—		—		26	1
Aves (loan)	Total		44	1	0	0	—		—		—		44	1
Boavista	2003–04	Primeira Liga	29	0	0	0	—		—		—		29	0
Porto	2004–05	Primeira Liga	13	0	0	0	—		2 (Note: Appearances in UEFA Champions League)	0	—		15	0
Porto	2005–06	Primeira Liga	18	2	3	0	—		1	0	—		22	2
Porto	2006–07	Primeira Liga	25	3	1	0	—		7	1	1 (Note: Appearances in Supertaça Cândido de Oliveira)	0	34	4
Porto	2007–08	Primeira Liga	28	4	4	0	0	0	8	1	1	0	41	5
Porto	2008–09	Primeira Liga	28	4	4	1	0	0	9	0	1	0	42	5
Porto	2009–10	Primeira Liga	25	2	4	2	1	0	8	0	1	0	39	4
Porto	2010–11	Primeira Liga	0	0	0	0	0	0	0	0	1	0	1	0
Porto	Total		137	15	20	3	1	0	35	2	5	0	198	20
Liverpool	2010–11	Premier League	33	5	1	0	0	0	7 (Note: Appearances in UEFA Europa League)	0	—		41	5
Liverpool	2011–12	Premier League	2	0	0	0	1	0	—		—		3	0
Liverpool	Total		35	5	1	0	1	0	7	0	—		44	5
Chelsea	2011–12	Premier League	28	2	6	2	0	0	11	2	—		45	6
Chelsea	2012–13	Premier League	3	0	0	0	0	0	0	0	0	0	3	0
Chelsea	Total		31	2	6	2	0	0	11	2	0	0	48	6
Fenerbahçe	2012–13	Süper Lig	22	2	3	0	—		8	1	—		33	3
Fenerbahçe	2013–14	Süper Lig	20	1	0	0	—		4	1	0	0	24	2
Fenerbahçe	2014–15	Süper Lig	23	2	3	0	—		—		1	0	27	2
Fenerbahçe	2015–16	Süper Lig	11	1	3	0	—		7 (Note: Appearances in UEFA Champions League and UEFA Europa League)	0	—		21	1
Fenerbahçe	Total		76	6	9	0	—		19	2	1	0	105	8
Career total			356	28	30	3	8	2	72	6	6	0	472	39

=== International ===
Appearances and goals by national team and year
	Year	Apps	Goals
Portugal	2006	1	0
Portugal	2007	5	0
Portugal	2008	12	1
Portugal	2009	12	2
Portugal	2010	13	5
Portugal	2011	10	0
Portugal	2012	11	0
Portugal	2013	8	1
Portugal	2014	4	1
Total		76	10

Scores and results list Portugal's goal tally first, score column indicates score after each Meireles goal.

List of international goals scored by Raul Meireles
No.	Date	Venue	Opponent	Score	Result	Competition
1	7 June 2008	Stade de Genève, Geneva, Switzerland	Turkey	2–0	2–0	UEFA Euro 2008
2	12 August 2009	Rheinpark, Vaduz, Liechtenstein	Liechtenstein	2–0	3–0	Friendly
3	18 November 2009	Bilino Polje, Zenica, Bosnia and Herzegovina	Bosnia and Herzegovina	1–0	1–0	2010 World Cup qualification – Playoffs
4	1 June 2010	Complexo Desportivo, Covilhã, Portugal	Cameroon	1–0	3–1	Friendly
5	1 June 2010	Complexo Desportivo, Covilhã, Portugal	Cameroon	2–0	3–1	Friendly
6	21 June 2010	Cape Town Stadium, Cape Town, South Africa	North Korea	1–0	7–0	2010 FIFA World Cup
7	3 September 2010	D. Afonso Henriques, Guimarães, Portugal	Cyprus	2–2	4–4	Euro 2012 qualifying
8	12 October 2010	Laugardalsvöllur, Reykjavík, Iceland	Iceland	2–1	3–1	UEFA Euro 2012 qualifying
9	10 September 2013	Gillette Stadium, Foxborough, United States	Brazil	1–0	1–3	Friendly
10	5 March 2014	Dr. Magalhães Pessoa, Leiria, Portugal	Cameroon	2–1	5–1	Friendly

== Honours ==
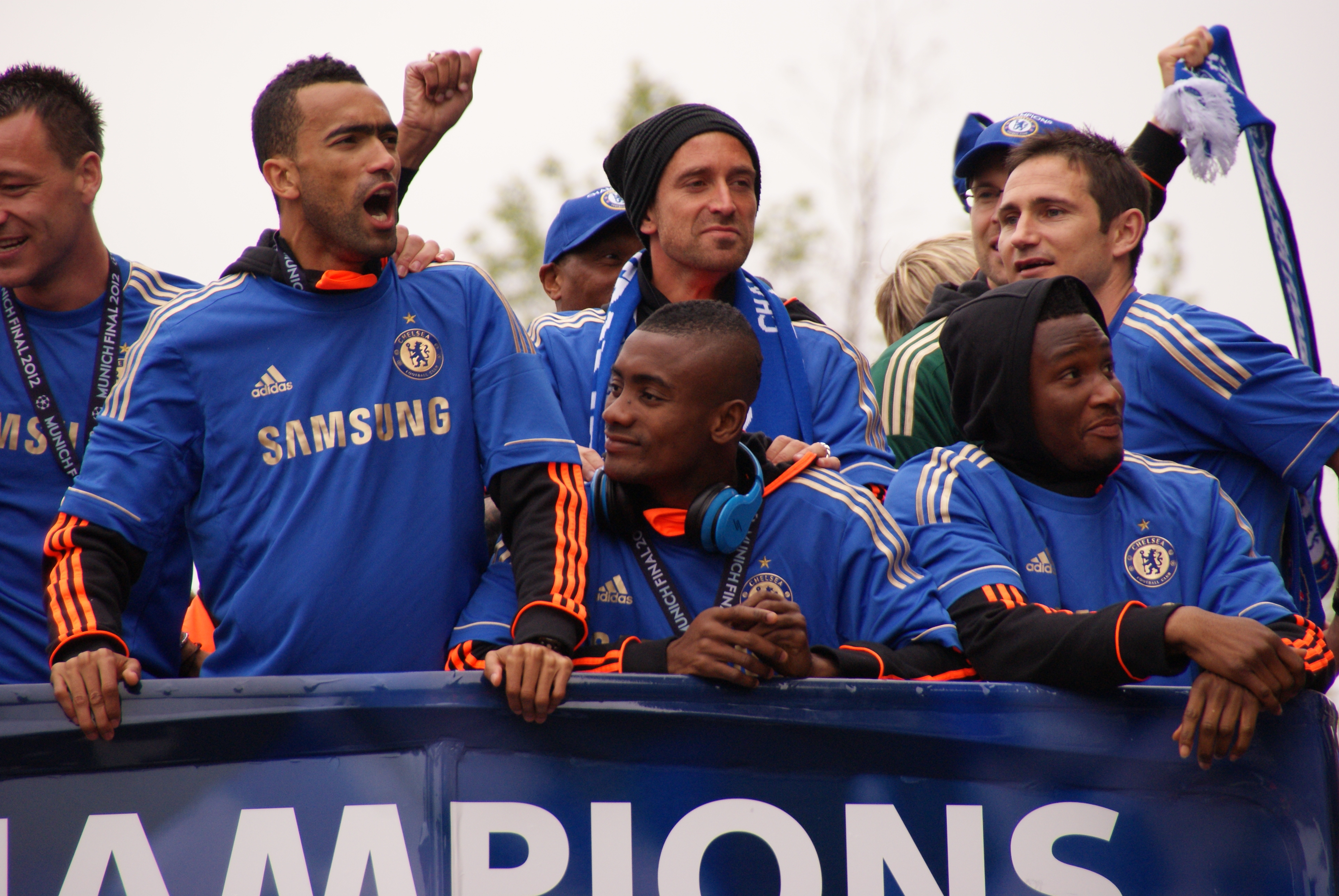
Meireles (centre) in Chelsea's victory parade after the 2012 Champions League Final

Porto

- Primeira Liga: 2005–06, 2006–07, 2007–08, 2008–09
- Taça de Portugal: 2005–06, 2008–09, 2009–10
- Supertaça Cândido de Oliveira: 2006, 2009, 2010

Chelsea

- FA Cup: 2011–12
- UEFA Champions League: 2011–12

Fenerbahçe

- Süper Lig: 2013–14
- Turkish Cup: 2012–13
- Turkish Super Cup: 2014

Portugal U-16

- UEFA European Under-16 Championship: 2000

Portugal U-21

- Toulon Tournament: 2003

Individual

- PFA Fans' Player of the Month: February 2011
- PFA Fans' Player of the Year: 2011
