= Cleverson =

Cleverson is a given name. It may refer to:

- Maurílio (footballer) (born 1969), Cléverson Maurílio Silva, Brazilian football manager and former striker
- Cleverson da Silva (born 1973), Brazilian hurdler
- Cleverson (footballer) (born 1983), Cleverson Rosário dos Santos, Brazilian football midfielder
- Cléo (born 1985), Cléverson Gabriel Córdova, Brazilian football striker

== See also ==
- Cleberson, given name
