= Cleberson =

Cleberson is a name used by a number of Brazilian footballers. Notable people with the name include:

- Cleberson Souza Santos (born 1978)
- Cleberson Silva Andrade (born 1988)
- Cleberson Luis Marques (born 1984)

== See also ==
- Cleverson (disambiguation), given name
