= José Rachão =

Portuguese football manager (born 1952)

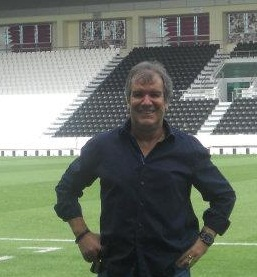
- Rachão in 2012

Personal information
- Full name: José Fernando Casal Rachão
- Date of birth: 15 September 1952 (age 74)
- Place of birth: Peniche, Portugal
- Position: Midfielder

Youth career
- 1967–1968: Peniche
- 1968–1971: Benfica

Senior career*
Years	Team	Apps	(Gls)
1971–1972	Peniche		
1972–1976	Montijo		
1976–1977	Académico de Viseu	25	(3)
1977–1978	Vitória Setúbal	23	(1)
1978–1979	Académico de Viseu	24	(0)
1979–1981	Portimonense	45	(1)
1981–1982	Farense	21	(3)
1982–1983	Leixões	12	(2)

Managerial career
- 1983–1984: Leixões
- 1984–1985: Caldas
- 1986: Famalicão
- 1987: Águeda
- 1987–1988: Fafe
- 1989: Varzim
- 1989–1990: Águeda
- 1990–1991: Académico de Viseu
- 1991–1993: Académica
- 1993–1994: Rio Ave
- 1994: Nacional
- 1994: Paços Ferreira
- 1994–1995: Amora
- 1995–1996: Maia
- 1997: Barreirense
- 1997–2000: Barreirense
- 2001: Estoril Praia
- 2001: Atlético CP
- 2002: Seixal
- 2002–2003: Barreirense
- 2003–2005: Torreense
- 2005: Vitória Setúbal
- 2006: União Madeira
- 2006–2008: Al-Arabi
- 2008–2009: Al-Ittihad Tripoli
- 2009–2010: Al-Ittihad Aleppo
- 2010–2011: Najran
- 2012: Al-Naser
- 2017–2018: Águeda
- 2018–2019: Peniche
- 2019: Olímpico do Montijo
- * Club domestic league appearances and goals

José Fernando Casal Rachão (born 15 September 1952) is a Portuguese former football player and manager.

A midfielder, he was a youth player at Benfica, and retired from playing at age 30 to start his managerial career, which included 27 clubs over nearly 40 years. He only managed in the Primeira Liga with Fafe in 1988–89 and Vitória de Setúbal in 2005, winning the Taça de Portugal for the latter by defeating Benfica in the final.

From 2006 to 2012, Rachão worked in the Arab world, in the top divisions of football in Kuwait, Libya, Syria and Saudi Arabia. He won the Libyan Premier League with Al-Ittihad in 2008–09.

== Playing career ==
Born in Peniche in the Leiria District, Rachão signed for S.L. Benfica when he was 14. The Lisbon-based club paid G.D. Peniche 50,000 Portuguese escudos for his transfer, as well as providing his food and education; he moved to the capital alone as his father, a director of the local club, did not approve of the deal.

In September 1971, 19-year-old Rachão saw no future at Benfica due to their high number of talented players, and he requested a transfer. He played one season back at Peniche in the second division before choosing to move to Clube Olímpico do Montijo due to being closer to his house than his other suitors: Atlético Clube de Portugal in the Primeira Liga, and C.F. União de Coimbra, S.C. Beira-Mar and S.C. Braga of the second tier.

== Managerial career ==
=== Early years and Vitória Setúbal ===
Rachão's managerial career began in 1983 at Leixões S.C., his last club as a player, having been chosen by his teammates. In 1978, he had been player-manager at Académico de Viseu F.C. aged 26.

At the start of February 2005, Vitória de Setúbal manager José Couceiro moved to FC Porto, and 52-year-old Rachão was hired in his place until the end of the season, with one more year as an option. He had played for the club in 1978–79 and arrived from third-tier S.C.U. Torreense, having managed 18 clubs but only having Primeira Liga experience at AD Fafe in 1988–89 – that club's only season in the top flight. Rachão had local connections, with his mother being from Setúbal and his wife and daughters being from Montijo in the same district.

Rachão set his targets as helping the club avoid relegation, and to reach the final of the Taça de Portugal, where they were in the quarter-finals. His debut on 13 February 2005 was a 1–1 draw away to S.C. Beira-Mar. By reaching the cup final, the club qualified for the UEFA Cup, as opponents Benfica had made the UEFA Champions League; in the decisive match on 29 May, the club recovered from conceding an early penalty kick by Simão Sabrosa to win 2–1 for their first cup in 38 years, preventing the adversaries from winning the double. Despite this honour, his contract was not renewed.

=== Years abroad ===
After leaving Vitória, Rachão was manager of União da Madeira before moving abroad for the first time in his career, to Al-Arabi SC of the Kuwait Premier League in 2006. After two years there, he signed for Al-Ittihad Club from Tripoli, Libya's most successful club. He won the Libyan Premier League in his only season in North Africa. Rachão befriended Muhammad Gaddafi, owner of the club and son of the Libyan leader Muammar Gaddafi; he said that after leaving the club he was invited to go underwater diving with his former employer, but turned down the invitation by joking that it would be an assassination attempt.

In 2009, Rachão joined Al-Ittihad SC Aleppo in Syria. He left both Libya and Syria before both countries fell into civil war, which led to jokes from friends when he returned to Kuwait.

=== Return to Portugal ===
Rachão was hired at R.D. Águeda in February 2017. It was his first job since leaving Saudi Arabia's Abha Club in 2013, his first in Portugal since 2005 and a return to the club he had left in 1990, now in the Aveiro Football Association's district league. He won promotion to the third-tier Campeonato de Portugal, where at 65 he was the oldest manager in a national division in the country.

Rachão moved to his hometown club Peniche in the same league in 2018–19. He left by mutual consent in March after winning four and losing eight of 19 games, putting the team in the relegation zone. On 13 June 2019, he was appointed at Montijo, the 27th club in his career.
