= Goran Lovre =

Serbian footballer

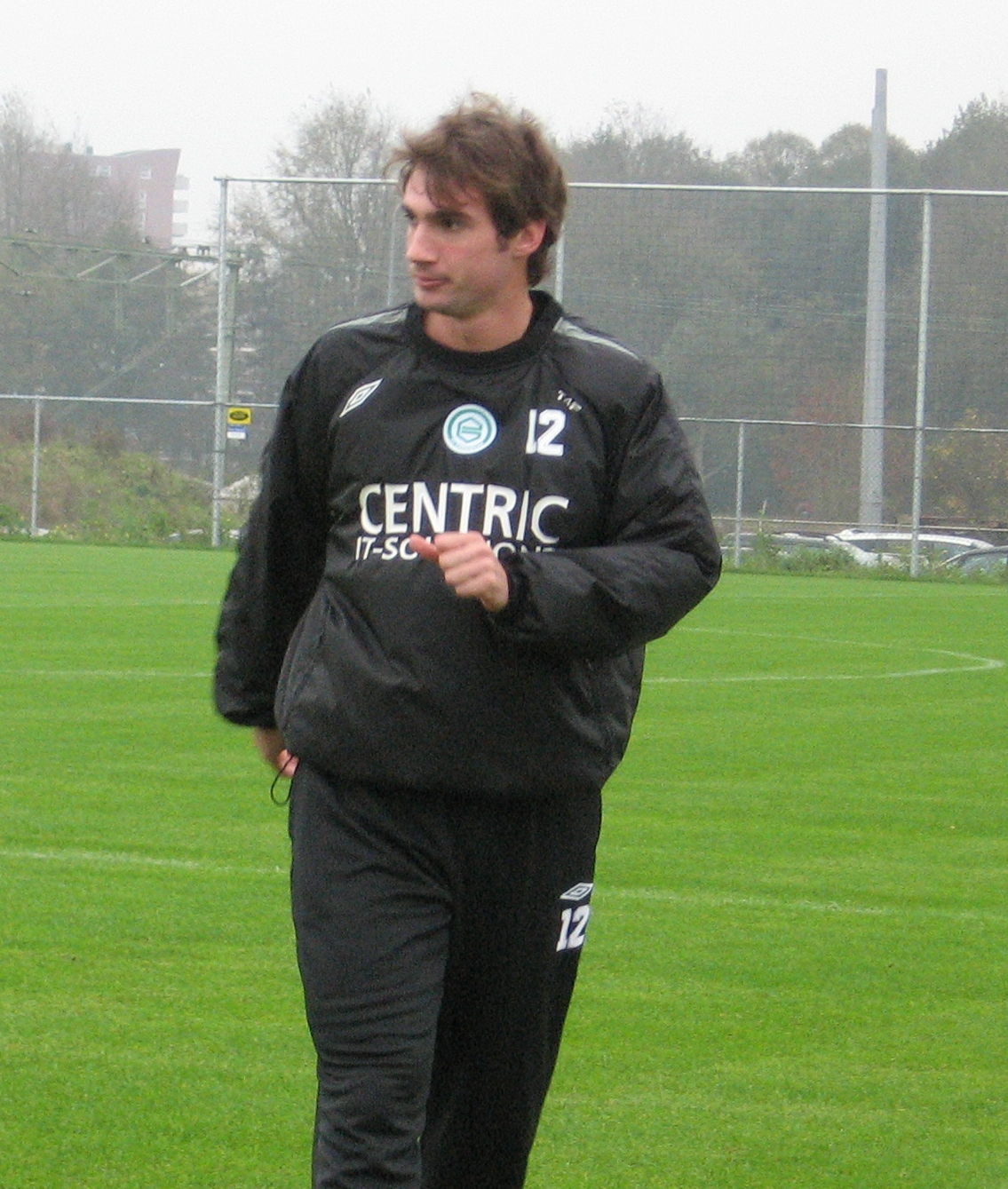
- Lovre in 2006

Personal information
- Full name: Goran Lovre
- Date of birth: 23 March 1982 (age 44)
- Place of birth: Zagreb, SR Croatia, SFR Yugoslavia
- Height: 1.90 m (6 ft 3 in)
- Position: Midfielder

Youth career
- 1991–1998: Partizan
- 1998–2001: Anderlecht

Senior career*
Years	Team	Apps	(Gls)
2001–2006	Anderlecht	46	(5)
2006–2010	Groningen	128	(23)
2010–2012	Barnsley	21	(2)
2012–2013	Partizan	4	(0)
2013	Esteghlal	2	(0)
2014	SSV Ulm	14	(1)
Total		215	(31)

International career
1999–2001	FR Yugoslavia U-18	6	(1)
2002–2004	FRY / S&M U-21	7	(1)
2004	Serbia and Montenegro U-23	2	(0)
Medal record
Silver medal – second place	UEFA Under-21 Championship	2004
- * Club domestic league appearances and goals

Goran Lovre (Serbian Cyrillic: Горан Ловре; born 23 March 1982) is a Serbian former professional footballer who played as a midfielder.

== Club career ==
After playing five seasons for Anderlecht, Lovre signed a two-year deal with Groningen in the 2006 summer transfer window, with a possibility of a two-year extension. He spent four years in the Netherlands, making near 130 Eredivisie appearances and scoring 23 goals.

On 28 May 2010, Lovre signed a two-year deal with the English Championship side Barnsley. He scored his first goal for the club in a 3–1 win over Ipswich Town, where he was influential in the middle of the park, getting an assist. On 7 December 2011, his contract with Barnsley was terminated by mutual consent after featuring very little under new manager Keith Hill.

In June 2012, Serbian press reported that he might sign a contract with Partizan, the club where he started playing football. On 9 June 2012, Lovre signed a two-year contract with the Serbian SuperLiga champions.

In July 2013 some rumors in Iran had it that he was about to sign a contract with Esteghlal, having lost its pivotal midfielder Mojtaba Jabbari a few days back, the management of the Iranian club was under tremendous pressure to hire a competent replacement. Lovre also was in trial with Esteghlal in January 2013 but he was not confirmed by the club head coach Amir Ghalenoei. Finally, he joined to the team on 21 July 2013 with signing a one-year contract.

In February 2014, he joined the German fourth division club SSV Ulm 1846.

== International career ==
Lovre won a silver medal with the Serbia and Montenegro U-21 team at the UEFA European Championship in 2004. In the same year, he was also a part of the Serbia and Montenegro U-23 team that participated at the Summer Olympics, when they exited in the group stage.

== Career statistics ==
Appearances and goals by club, season and competition
Club	Season	League			Cup		League Cup		Continental		Other		Total	
Club	Season	Division	Apps	Goals	Apps	Goals	Apps	Goals	Apps	Goals	Apps	Goals	Apps	Goals
Anderlecht	2001–02	Belgian First Division	1	0	0	0	–		0	0	0	0	1	0
Anderlecht	2002–03	Belgian First Division	15	2	2	0	–		2	0	0	0	19	2
Anderlecht	2003–04	Belgian First Division	10	1	1	0	–		3	1	0	0	14	2
Anderlecht	2004–05	Belgian First Division	18	2	1	0	–		4	0	1	0	24	2
Anderlecht	2005–06	Belgian First Division	2	0	0	0	–		1	0	0	0	3	0
Anderlecht	Total		46	5	4	0	–		10	1	1	0	61	6
Groningen	2006–07	Eredivisie	30	8	2	0	–		1	0	3	1	36	9
Groningen	2007–08	Eredivisie	33	9	1	0	–		2	1	1	1	37	11
Groningen	2008–09	Eredivisie	32	4	3	0	–		0	0	4	1	39	5
Groningen	2009–10	Eredivisie	33	2	3	1	–		0	0	1	0	37	3
Groningen	Total		128	23	9	1	–		3	1	9	3	149	28
Barnsley	2010–11	Championship	21	2	1	0	1	0	0	0	0	0	23	2
Barnsley	2011–12	Championship	0	0	0	0	0	0	0	0	0	0	0	0
Barnsley	Total		21	2	1	0	1	0	0	0	0	0	23	2
Partizan	2012–13	Serbian SuperLiga	4	0	2	0	–		2	0	0	0	8	0
Esteghlal	2013–14	Iran Pro League	2	0	0	0	–		1	0	0	0	3	0
SSV Ulm	2013–14	Regionalliga Südwest	14	1	0	0	–		–		0	0	14	1
Career total			215	31	16	1	1	0	16	2	10	3	258	37
