= Joël Kiki N'Gako =

French footballer (born 1985)

Personal information
- Full name: Joël Kiki N'Gako Nyobu
- Date of birth: 21 October 1985 (age 41)
- Place of birth: Cameroon
- Position: Defender

Senior career*
Years	Team	Apps	(Gls)
	Toulouse FC	0	(0)
2004/2005	FC Porto	0	(0)
- OFC Belasitsa Petrich
2008/2009	FC Oberneuland	12	(0)
2010	Vera Cruz Futebol Clube		
2011	Associação Acadêmica e Desportiva Vitória das Tabocas	9	(0)
2011/2012	FC Costuleni	6	(0)
-2014/15	Toulouse Rodéo FC	21+	(0+)
- * Club domestic league appearances and goals

Joël Kiki N'Gako Nyobu (born 21 October 1985) is a French retired footballer.

== Career ==
After failing to make an appearance for French Ligue 1 side Toulouse and Porto, one of the most successful Portuguese teams, N'Gako played signed for OFC Belasitsa Petrich in Bulgaria. He played for the club during the 2006 A PFG season, before joining German fourth division club Oberneuland.

For 2010, he signed for Vera Cruz Futebol Clube to play in the Pernambucano state championship. He was the first foreign footballer signed in the club's 50 years of existence.

For 2011, he signed for another Brazilian outfit, Associação Acadêmica e Desportiva Vitória das Tabocas.

For the second half of 2011/12, N'Gako signed for Costuleni in the Moldovan top flight, where he made 6 league appearances. After that, he played in the French fifth division for Toulouse Rodéo.
