= Cleberson (footballer, born 1988) =

Brazilian footballer

Personal information
- Full name: Cleberson Silva Andrade
- Date of birth: September 30, 1988 (age 38)
- Place of birth: Rio de Janeiro, Brazil
- Height: 1.78 m (5 ft 10 in)
- Position: Central defender

Team information
- Current team: Santa Cruz

Youth career
- Years: Team
- 2004–2005: Bahia
- 2006–2007: Cruzeiro
- 2008: Santa Cruz (Loan)

Cleberson Silva Andrade or simply Cleberson (born September 30, 1988 in Rio de Janeiro), is a Brazilian central defender. He currently plays for Santa Cruz on loan from Cruzeiro.

== Contract ==
- Santa Cruz (Loan) 1 January 2008 to 31 May 2008
- Cruzeiro 29 April 2006 to 23 April 2009
