= 2004 UEFA European Under-21 Championship =

U-21-Fußball-Europameisterschaft 2004

Tournament details
- Host country: Germany
- Dates: 27 May – 8 June
- Teams: 8 (finals); 48 (qualifying)
- Venues: 4 (in 4 host cities)

Final positions
- Champions: Italy (5th title)
- Runners-up: Serbia and Montenegro
- Third place: Portugal
- Fourth place: Sweden

Tournament statistics
- Matches played: 16
- Goals scored: 52 (3.25 per match)
- Attendance: 110,353 (6,897 per match)
- Top scorer(s): (Sweden) Johan Elmander (Italy) Alberto Gilardino (4 goals each)
- Best player: (Italy) Alberto Gilardino

The 2004 UEFA European Under-21 Championship was the 14th staging of UEFA's European Under-21 Championship. The final tournament was hosted by Germany between 27 May and 8 June 2004.

Italy won the competition for the fifth time. Italy's Alberto Gilardino won the Golden Player award.

The top three teams in this competition qualified for Athens 2004 Olympics, along with hosts Greece U21s.

== Qualification ==
The 48 national teams were divided into ten groups (two groups of four + eight groups of 5). The records of the ten group runners-up were then compared. The top six joined the ten winners in a play-off for the eight finals spots. One of the eight qualifiers was then chosen to host the remaining fixtures.

== Matches ==
=== Group stage ===
==== Group A ====
Team	Pld	W	D	L	GF	GA	GD	Pts
Italy	3	2	0	1	4	3	+1	6
Serbia and Montenegro	3	2	0	1	6	5	+1	6
Belarus	3	1	1	1	4	4	0	4
Croatia	3	0	1	2	3	5	−2	1

27 May 2004
18:15

Serbia and Montenegro	3–2	Croatia
Lazović 37'; Lovre 47'; Ivanović 86'	Report	Eduardo 49'; Kranjčar 68'

Niederrheinstadion, Oberhausen
Attendance: 4,100
Referee: Luis Medina Cantalejo (Spain)
27 May 2004
20:45

Italy	1–2	Belarus
Gilardino 58'	Report	Kirenkin 6'; A. Hleb 44'

Ruhrstadion, Bochum
Attendance: 3,712
Referee: Matt Messias (England)

29 May 2004
15:30

Belarus	1–1	Croatia
Kirylchyk 82'	Report	Lučić 38'

Niederrheinstadion, Oberhausen
Attendance: 2,000
Referee: Michal Beneš (Czech Republic)
29 May 2004
20:45

Italy	2–1	Serbia and Montenegro
Sculli 30', 53'	Report	Vukčević 86'

Ruhrstadion, Bochum
Attendance: 4,675
Referee: Grzegorz Gilewski (Poland)

1 June 2004
20:45

Italy	1–0	Croatia
De Rossi 21'	Report

Ruhrstadion, Bochum
Attendance: 5,468
Referee: Bertrand Layec (France)
1 June 2004
20:45

Belarus	1–2	Serbia and Montenegro
Shkabara 13'	Report	Lazović 47' (pen.); Milovanović 55'

Niederrheinstadion, Oberhausen
Attendance: 3,500
Referee: Alexandru Tudor (Romania)

==== Group B ====
Team	Pld	W	D	L	GF	GA	GD	Pts
Sweden	3	3	0	0	8	3	+5	9
Portugal	3	1	1	1	5	6	−1	4
Germany	3	1	0	2	4	5	−1	3
Switzerland	3	0	1	2	4	7	−3	1

28 May 2004
18:15

Germany	2–1	Switzerland
Auer 21'; Hitzlsperger 63'	Report	D. Degen 75'

Stadion am Bruchweg, Mainz
Attendance: 12,240
Referee: Bertrand Layec (France)
28 May 2004
20:45

Sweden	3–1	Portugal
Elmander 40', 50'; Ishizaki 71'	Report	Almeida 28'

Carl-Benz-Stadion, Mannheim
Attendance: 3,800
Referee: Alexandru Tudor (Romania)

30 May 2004
18:15

Germany	1–2	Sweden
Auer 84'	Report	Jönsson 49'; Elmander 62'

Carl-Benz-Stadion, Mannheim
Attendance: 18,650
Referee: Luis Medina Cantalejo (Spain)
30 May 2004
20:45

Switzerland	2–2	Portugal
Vonlanthen 57'; Baykal 86'	Report	Carlos Martins 66' (pen.); Almeida 71'

Stadion am Bruchweg, Mainz
Attendance: 2,507
Referee: Matt Messias (England)

2 June 2004
18:15

Germany	1–2	Portugal
Schweinsteiger 41'	Report	Almeida 24'; Lourenço 78'

Stadion am Bruchweg, Mainz
Attendance: 13,400
Referee: Grzegorz Gilewski (Poland)
2 June 2004
18:15

Switzerland	1–3	Sweden
Barnetta 21'	Report	Jaggy 40' (o.g.); Rosenberg 62', 88'

Carl-Benz-Stadion, Mannheim
Attendance: 2,500
Referee: Michal Beneš (Czech Republic)

=== Knockout stage ===
Semi-finals
5 June – Bochum
Sweden	1 (5)
Serbia and Montenegro (p)	1 (6)
5 June – Oberhausen
Italy	3
Portugal	1

Final
8 June – Bochum
Italy	3
Serbia and Montenegro	0
Olympic play-off
8 June – Oberhausen
Portugal (a.e.t.)	3
Sweden	2

==== Semi-finals ====
5 June 2004
18:15

Sweden	1–1 (a.e.t.)	Serbia and Montenegro
Stefanidis 36'	Report	Marić 90+1'
Penalties
Ishizaki (penalty scored); Jönsson (penalty scored); Holmén (penalty scored); Dorsin (penalty scored); Rosenberg (penalty scored); Stefanidis (penalty missed)	5–6	(penalty scored) Delibašić; (penalty scored) Vukčević; (penalty scored) Milovanović; (penalty scored) Đalović; (penalty scored) Miladinović; (penalty scored) Marić

Niederrheinstadion, Oberhausen
Attendance: 4,500
Referee: Matt Messias (England)

5 June 2004
20:45

Italy	3–1	Portugal
Gilardino 19', 77'; Pinzi 24'	Report	Oliveira 28'

Ruhrstadion, Bochum
Attendance: 7,709
Referee: Michal Beneš (Czech Republic)

==== Olympic play-off ====
8 June 2004
18:15

Portugal	3–2 (a.e.t.)	Sweden
Viana 76' (pen.); J. Ribeiro 84'; Carlitos 114'	Report	Elmander 45+1'; Rosenberg 90'

Niederrheinstadion, Oberhausen
Attendance: 1,500
Referee: Bertrand Layec (France)

==== Final ====
8 June 2004
21:00

Italy	3–0	Serbia and Montenegro
De Rossi 32'; Bovo 83'; Gilardino 85'	Report

Ruhrstadion, Bochum
Attendance: 20,092
Referee: Luis Medina Cantalejo (Spain)

GK	1	Marco Amelia
DF	5	Daniele Bonera		(substituted off) 90+5'
DF	13	Andrea Barzagli
DF	14	Cesare Bovo
DF	3	Emiliano Moretti
MF	17	Giandomenico Mesto
MF	8	Angelo Palombo
MF	6	Daniele De Rossi	(yellow card) 29'
MF	15	Marco Donadel	(yellow card) 28'	(substituted off) 88'
FW	11	Giuseppe Sculli		(substituted off) 74'
FW	9	Alberto Gilardino
Substitutions:
MF	19	Simone Del Nero	(yellow card) 80'	(substituted on) 74'
MF	10	Matteo Brighi		(substituted on) 88'
DF	2	Cristian Zaccardo		(substituted on) 90+5'
Coach:
(Italy) Claudio Gentile

GK	1	Nikola Milojević
DF	19	Branislav Ivanović	(red card) 90+2'
DF	6	Marko Baša
DF	16	Milan Biševac	(yellow card) 50'
MF	15	Dejan Milovanović		(substituted off) 63'
MF	2	Dragan Stančić
MF	14	Bojan Miladinović		(substituted off) 83'
MF	10	Miloš Marić
MF	3	Nikola Mijailović	(yellow card) 11' (yellow-red card) 34'
FW	7	Danko Lazović
FW	21	Radomir Đalović		(substituted off) 45'
Substitutions:
FW	17	Simon Vukčević		(substituted on) 45'
MF	11	Igor Matić	(yellow card) 87'	(substituted on) 63'
DF	13	Bojan Neziri		(substituted on) 83'
Coach:
(Serbia and Montenegro) Vladimir Petrović

Assistant referees:
Victoriano Giráldez Carrasco (Spain)
Mark Simons (Belgium)
Fourth official:
Matthew David Messias (England)

== Goalscorers ==
4 goals

- (Italy) Alberto Gilardino
- (Sweden) Johan Elmander

3 goals

- (Portugal) Hugo Almeida
- (Sweden) Markus Rosenberg

2 goals

- (Germany) Benjamin Auer
- (Italy) Daniele De Rossi
- (Italy) Giuseppe Sculli
- (Serbia and Montenegro) Danko Lazović

1 goal

- (Belarus) Alexander Hleb
- (Belarus) Raman Kirenkin
- (Belarus) Pavel Kirylchyk
- (Belarus) Aleh Shkabara
- (Croatia) Niko Kranjčar
- (Croatia) Mario Lučić
- (Croatia) Eduardo da Silva
- (Germany) Thomas Hitzlsperger
- (Germany) Bastian Schweinsteiger
- (Italy) Cesare Bovo
- (Italy) Giampiero Pinzi

1 goal, cont.

- (Portugal) Carlitos
- (Portugal) Luis Lourenço
- (Portugal) Carlos Martins
- (Portugal) Pedro Oliveira
- (Portugal) Jorge Ribeiro
- (Portugal) Hugo Viana
- (Serbia and Montenegro) Branislav Ivanović
- (Serbia and Montenegro) Goran Lovre
- (Serbia and Montenegro) Miloš Marić
- (Serbia and Montenegro) Dejan Milovanović
- (Serbia and Montenegro) Simon Vukčević
- (Sweden) Stefan Ishizaki
- (Sweden) Jon Jönsson
- (Sweden) Babis Stefanidis
- (Switzerland) Tranquillo Barnetta
- (Switzerland) David Degen
- (Switzerland) Baykal Kulaksızoğlu
- (Switzerland) Johan Vonlanthen

Own goals

- (Switzerland) Kim Jaggy (for Sweden)

== Medal table and Olympic qualifiers ==
- Greece (as hosts), Italy, Serbia & Montenegro and Portugal qualify for the Olympic games finals.

See Football at the 2004 Summer Olympics

Pos	Team	Pld	W	D	L	GF	GA	GD	Pts	Final result
1st place, gold medalist(s)	Italy	5	4	0	1	10	4	+6	12	Gold medal
2nd place, silver medalist(s)	Serbia and Montenegro	5	2	1	2	7	9	−2	7	Silver medal
3rd place, bronze medalist(s)	Portugal	5	2	1	2	9	11	−2	7	Bronze medal
4	Sweden	5	3	1	1	11	7	+4	10	Fourth place
5	Belarus	3	1	1	1	4	4	0	4	Eliminated in group stage
6	Germany (H)	3	1	0	2	4	5	−1	3	Eliminated in group stage
7	Croatia	3	0	1	2	3	5	−2	1	Eliminated in group stage
8	Switzerland	3	0	1	2	4	7	−3	1	Eliminated in group stage

Source: [ ]
(H) Hosts
