= Manuel José Vieira =

Portuguese footballer (born 1981)

Manuel José
Personal information
- Full name: Manuel José Azevedo Vieira
- Date of birth: 4 February 1981 (age 45)
- Place of birth: Vila Nova de Gaia, Portugal
- Height: 1.76 m (5 ft 9 in)
- Position: Midfielder

Youth career
- 1989–1991: Ermesinde
- 1991–1992: Candal
- 1992–1999: Porto

Senior career*
| Years | Team | Apps | (Gls) |
| 1999–2002 | Porto B | 88 | (23) |
| 2002–2005 | Porto | 0 | (0) |
| 2002 | → União Lamas (loan) | 12 | (4) |
| 2003 | → Académica (loan) | 15 | (1) |
| 2003 | → Vitória Guimarães (loan) | 3 | (1) |
| 2004–2005 | → Vitória Setúbal (loan) | 44 | (4) |
| 2005–2006 | Boavista | 33 | (3) |
| 2006–2009 | CFR Cluj | 56 | (1) |
| 2009–2016 | Paços Ferreira | 138 | (18) |
| 2016 | Leixões | 9 | (0) |
| 2017–2018 | Gondomar | 40 | (4) |
| 2018–2022 | Candal | 95 | (36) |
| Total | | 533 | (95) |

International career
| 1996 | Portugal U15 | 16 | (0) |
| 1997–1998 | Portugal U16 | 15 | (4) |
| 1999 | Portugal U17 | 5 | (1) |
| 1999 | Portugal U18 | 4 | (1) |
| 2001–2002 | Portugal U20 | 14 | (3) |
| 2002–2003 | Portugal U21 | 6 | (0) |
| 2004–2005 | Portugal B | 3 | (0) |
- * Club domestic league appearances and goals

Manuel José Azevedo Vieira (born 4 February 1981), known as Manuel José, is a Portuguese former professional footballer. Mainly a right midfielder, he could also play as an attacking right-back.

== Club career ==
Born in Vila Nova de Gaia, Porto District, Manuel José unsuccessfully graduated from FC Porto's academy, going on to serve a number of loans before being released. He made his Primeira Liga debut with Académica de Coimbra, where he played from January to June 2003.

Still owned by Porto, Manuel José then went on a one-and-a-half-year loan at Vitória de Setúbal. On 29 May 2005, he equalised an eventual 2–1 win against S.L. Benfica in the final of the Taça de Portugal.

After a solid season with Porto's neighbours Boavista FC, Manuel José joined Romania's CFR Cluj Portuguese contingent in June 2006, for €300,000. In his first year in Liga I he was a regular and the team player with the most assists, totalling 11; however, with the arrival of Ioan Andone as head coach in summer 2007, he lost his place in the starting XI and failed to regain that position.

Manuel José terminated his contract with Cluj on 5 February 2009. He returned to Portugal in July, signing with F.C. Paços de Ferreira. He scored a career-best eight goals in the 2012–13 campaign – in only 19 starts – being essential as the club finished third and qualified for the UEFA Champions League for the first time in its history.

On 5 July 2016, aged 35, Manuel José moved to Leixões S.C. of the LigaPro.

== Honours ==
Porto

- Taça de Portugal: 2002–03

Vitória Setúbal

- Taça de Portugal: 2004–05

Cluj

- Liga I: 2007–08
- Cupa României: 2007–08, 2008–09
