= Bruno Fogaça =

Brazilian footballer (born 1981)

Personal information
- Full name: Bruno França Fogaça
- Date of birth: 11 November 1981 (age 45)
- Place of birth: São Miguel Arcanjo, São Paulo, Brazil
- Height: 1.88 m (6 ft 2 in)
- Position: Forward

Team information
- Current team: Guarani (MG)

Senior career*
Years	Team	Apps	(Gls)
2001	Elfsborg	10	(2)
2002	Prudentópolis		
2003	Paraná		
2004	Marcílio Dias		
2005	Avaí	0	(0)
2005–2006	Naval	19	(6)
2006–2007	Skoda Xanthi		
2007–2009	Marítimo		
2009	Al-Shaab (UAE)		
2009–2010	Rio Ave		
2010	Bragantino		
2011	Guarani (MG)		
- * Club domestic league appearances and goals

Bruno França Fogaça (born 11 November 1981) is a Brazilian footballer who plays for Guarani (MG).

== Biography ==
The forward had played for IF Elfsborg, Skoda Xanthi and Naval 1º de Maio. He signed for Marítimo in 2007 on a free transfer. in January 2009 he left the club and joined United Arab Emirates side Al-Shaab. In 2009–10 season returned to Portugal for Rio Ave. In September 2010, he returned to Brazil, but Bragantino did not formally register him as a player. In January 2011, he left for Guarani of Minas Gerais state.
