= Diogo Gomes (footballer, born 1985) =

Brazilian footballer

Personal information
- Full name: Diogo Soares Gomes
- Date of birth: September 12, 1985 (age 41)
- Height: 1.83 m (6 ft 0 in)
- Position: Midfielder

Team information
- Current team: Pro Duta FC
- Number: 7

Senior career*
Years	Team	Apps	(Gls)
?–2008	J. Malucelli		
2008–2011	Académica de Coimbra	36	(4)
2011–	Pro Duta FC		
- * Club domestic league appearances and goals as of 04:19, 30 November 2008 (UTC)

Diogo Soares Gomes (born September 12, 1985), known as Diogo Gomes, is a Brazilian footballer currently playing for Pro Duta FC.

He previously played for clubs including Académica de Coimbra.
