= Maximiliano Asís =

Argentine footballer

Personal information
- Full name: César Maximiliano Asís
- Date of birth: 27 May 1987 (age 39)
- Place of birth: Tucumán, Argentina
- Height: 1.69 m (5 ft 6 1/2 in)
- Position: Midfielder

Youth career
- 2001–2005: FC Porto

Senior career*
Years	Team	Apps	(Gls)
2005–2007	Boca Juniors II		
2006–2007	Emelec		
2008–2011	Portimonense	13	(1)
2011–2012	FC Inter Turku	22	(2)
2012	San Lorenzo de Alem		
- * Club domestic league appearances and goals

César Maximiliano Asís (born 27 March 1987) is an Argentinian former footballer.

== Club career ==
He started career at youth level with FC Porto but when he turned professional in 2005 he was signed by Boca Juniors but since his arrival he hasn't had the best spells and has been loaned out to Emelec of Ecuador and Portimonense of Portugal in July 2008.
