= Pedro Oliveira (footballer, born 1981) =

Portuguese footballer

Personal information
- Full name: Pedro Miguel Ferreira de Oliveira
- Date of birth: 30 November 1981 (age 44)
- Place of birth: Porto, Portugal
- Height: 1.76 m (5 ft 9 in)
- Position: Winger

Youth career
- 1989–2000: Boavista

Senior career*
Years	Team	Apps	(Gls)
2000–2005	Porto B	70	(17)
2003	→ Académica (loan)	4	(0)
2003–2004	→ Leixões (loan)	26	(4)
2004–2005	→ Vitória Setúbal (loan)	17	(0)
2005–2006	Vitória Setúbal	27	(3)
2006–2008	CFR Cluj	30	(3)
2008	→ UTA Arad (loan)	8	(0)
2008–2009	Modena	21	(4)
2009–2010	Arezzo	23	(2)
2011	Pisa	10	(1)
2012	Portimonense	11	(0)
2012–2014	Créteil	38	(3)
2016–2017	Gondomar B	13	(2)
2017–2020	Padroense	50	(12)
Total		348	(51)

International career
1997	Portugal U15	14	(6)
1997–1998	Portugal U16	8	(1)
1998–1999	Portugal U17	7	(3)
1999	Portugal U18	3	(0)
2001–2002	Portugal U20	15	(2)
2003–2004	Portugal U21	5	(3)
2004	Portugal B	2	(1)

Managerial career
- 2021–2023: Pedras Rubras
- 2023–2024: Sanjoanense
Medal record
Men's football
Representing Portugal
UEFA European Under-21 Championship
Third place	2004 Germany
- * Club domestic league appearances and goals

Pedro Miguel Ferreira de Oliveira (born 30 November 1981) is a Portuguese former professional footballer who played as a right winger.

== Club career ==
After more than one decade in the youth academy of Boavista F.C. in his hometown of Porto, Oliveira moved to neighbours FC Porto at the age of 18, where he was largely unsuccessful, going on to serve loans the following two and a half years, the first one being at Académica de Coimbra in January 2003. In the 2005–06 season he signed a permanent contract with Vitória F.C. of Primeira Liga, having played there the previous year on loan.

In the summer of 2006, Oliveira left for Romania's CFR Cluj along with a handful of Portuguese players. In his first year he was an important first-team member as the team finished third in Liga I and qualified for the UEFA Cup, but he was deemed surplus to requirements in the following campaign, being loaned to fellow top-division club FC UTA Arad.

Oliveira moved countries again in 2008–09, joining Modena FC. The following summer, remaining in Italy, he signed with modest AC Arezzo (third tier) on a free transfer.

== Honours ==
Vitória Setúbal

- Taça de Portugal: 2004–05

CFR Cluj

- Liga I: 2007–08

Créteil

- Championnat National: 2012–13
