= Jorginho (footballer, born 1977) =

Brazilian footballer

Personal information
- Full name: Jorge Luiz Pereira Sousa
- Date of birth: 6 May 1977 (age 49)
- Place of birth: Goiânia, Brazil
- Height: 1.78 m (5 ft 10 in)
- Position: Forward

Senior career*
Years	Team	Apps	(Gls)
1994	Goiatuba		
1995–2000	Paranaense	37	(5)
2000	→ Santo André (loan)		
2000	Gama	6	(0)
2001	Goiânia		
2001–2005	Vitória Setúbal	128	(37)
2005–2007	Porto	44	(4)
2007–2009	Braga	22	(3)
2009–2011	Gaziantepspor	39	(3)
2011–2012	Rio Ave	9	(0)
2013–2014	Grêmio Anápolis	13	(1)
Total		298	(53)
- * Club domestic league appearances and goals

Jorge Luiz Pereira de Sousa (born 6 May 1977), commonly known as Jorginho, is a Brazilian retired professional footballer who played as a forward.

He spent most of his professional career in Portugal, amassing Primeira Liga totals of 170 games and 27 goals mainly in representation of Vitória de Setúbal (four years). He also represented in the competition Porto and Braga (two apiece), winning five major titles in the process.

== Career ==
Born in Goiânia, Goiás, Jorginho started his career in regional side Goiatuba Esporte Clube, earning him a transfer to Clube Atlético Paranaense where he played for five years, also being loaned to Esporte Clube Santo André. After spells with Sociedade Esportiva do Gama and Goiânia Esporte Clube, he moved to Portugal and Vitória F.C. in the 2001–02 season.

In Setúbal, Jorginho's first year was short of impressive, scoring two goals in 32 games. In the 2002–03 campaign, while he netted ten times, he saw Vitória sink to the second division, but helped them return to the top flight in the immediate year with a career-best 17 goals.

Jorginho would help Setúbal achieve a secure mid-table position in 2004–05 – which was at risk following José Couceiro's departure to FC Porto – and while he could have left Setúbal during the January 2005 transfer window on a free transfer, he remained at the club and was presented with a victory in the Cup of Portugal: after scoring twice in the side's 3–1 semi-final defeat of Vitória de Guimarães, he played the entire 2–1 final win against S.L. Benfica, and added nine league goals.

Jorginho eventually left for Porto, where he gained the confidence of manager Co Adriaanse (despite being signed still with Couceiro in charge), playing an attacking trio with Benni McCarthy, Lisandro López and Adriano. Towards the end of the 2005–06 season, he proved decisive in a title-decider between Sporting CP vs Porto, having scored the winning goal during the last minutes of the 8 April 2006 match (1–0 final result); Porto went on the conquer the title (he had also scored in the first encounter between the two sides in Porto, a 1–1 draw).

The following campaign, under Jesualdo Ferreira, Jorginho featured much less, but managed to score against former side Vitória in a 5–1 home success. On 30 August 2007, he signed with perennial UEFA Cup qualification candidates S.C. Braga, on a four-year link.

In August 2009, Jorginho left Portugal and joined Turkish team Gaziantepspor on a two-year contract. He signed alongside Braga teammate Roland Linz, returning to Portugal after two years and joining Rio Ave F.C. also from the top flight.

== Honours ==
Porto

- Primeira Liga: 2005–06, 2006–07
- Taça de Portugal: 2005–06
- Supertaça Cândido de Oliveira: 2006

Setúbal

- Taça de Portugal: 2004–05
