= Cleberson (footballer, born 1984) =

Brazilian footballer

Personal information
- Full name: Cleberson Luis Marques
- Date of birth: July 4, 1984 (age 42)
- Place of birth: Orlândia, Brazil
- Height: 1.82 m (6 ft 0 in)
- Position: Forward

Team information
- Current team: Comercial-SP

Senior career*
Years	Team	Apps	(Gls)
2002–2008	União São João	?	(?)
2004–2005	→ Porto (loan)	0	(0)
2007	→ Tokushima Vortis (loan)	14	(3)
2009	Bragantino		
2009–2010	São José		
2010	Brasil de Pelotas		
2011–	Comercial-SP		
- * Club domestic league appearances and goals as of 17 February 2008

Cleberson Luis Marques, or simply Cleberson (born July 4, 1984) is a Brazilian striker. He currently plays for Comercial Futebol Clube (SP).

Cleberson previously played for Tokushima Vortis in the J2 League.

== Club statistics ==
Club performance			League		Cup		Total	
Season	Club	League	Apps	Goals	Apps	Goals	Apps	Goals
Japan			League		Emperor's Cup		Total	
2007	Tokushima Vortis	J2 League	14	3	0	0	14	3
Country	Japan		14	3	0	0	14	3
Total			14	3	0	0	14	3
