= Sandro Mendes =

Cape Verdean footballer (born 1977)

Personal information
- Full name: Sandro Miguel Laranjeira Mendes
- Date of birth: 4 February 1977 (age 49)
- Place of birth: Pinhal Novo, Portugal
- Height: 1.82 m (6 ft 0 in)
- Position: Central midfielder

Youth career
- 1987–1989: Pelezinhos
- 1989–1995: Vitória Setúbal

Senior career*
| Years | Team | Apps | (Gls) |
| 1995–1997 | Vitória Setúbal | 41 | (3) |
| 1997–1999 | Hércules | 62 | (2) |
| 1999 | → Villarreal (loan) | 2 | (0) |
| 1999–2000 | Salamanca | 23 | (3) |
| 2000–2005 | Vitória Setúbal | 137 | (5) |
| 2005 | Porto | 0 | (0) |
| 2005 | → Manisaspor (loan) | 4 | (0) |
| 2006–2010 | Vitória Setúbal | 102 | (3) |
| 2010–2011 | Ceuta | 24 | (1) |
| 2011–2012 | Naval | 26 | (2) |
| Total | | 421 | (19) |

International career
| 1996–1997 | Portugal U21 | 8 | (0) |
| 1998 | Portugal U20 | 4 | (0) |
| 2004–2007 | Cape Verde | 9 | (0) |

Managerial career
- 2014–2015: Alcacerense
- 2019: Vitória Setúbal
- 2021–2022: Amora
- 2022–2023: Comércio Indústria
- 2023: Pêro Pinheiro
- * Club domestic league appearances and goals

Sandro Miguel Laranjeira Mendes (born 4 February 1977), known simply as Sandro as a player, is a Cape Verdean former professional footballer who played as a central midfielder, currently a manager.

Most of his career was spent with Vitória de Setúbal, where he had three separate spells. In the Primeira Liga, he amassed totals of 195 matches and six goals over nine seasons.

Sandro was born in Portugal, and thus held Portuguese citizenship. Internationally, he played for Portugal's under-20 and under-21 teams before representing Cape Verde at senior level.

== Club career ==
Sandro was born in Pinhal Novo, Setúbal District, Portugal. He started his career at Vitória de Setúbal and made his Primeira Liga debut in 1995, but moved to Hércules CF in the Spanish Segunda División aged 19 in 1997.

In January 1999, Sandro joined La Liga club Villarreal CF on loan, but made just two appearances in six months as the season ended in relegation. He returned to Spain's second tier the following campaign, with UD Salamanca.

After another five-year spell with Vitória Setúbal, FC Porto acquired Sandro's services for 2005–06. Having failed to make a competitive appearance, he was loaned to Turkey's Manisaspor until January 2006, when he rejoined Vitória for a third stint.

In the 2009–10 season, Sandro played 26 matches and scored once, in a 2–1 away win against relegation rivals Leixões S.C. on 14 March 2010, as Setúbal retained top-flight status. In July 2010 the 33-year-old left for Spain again, signing for Segunda División B side AD Ceuta where he was joined by several compatriots.

Prior to the start of the 2011–12 campaign, Sandro signed with Associação Naval 1º de Maio of the Portuguese Segunda Liga.

== International career ==
Sandro won 12 caps for Portugal at youth level, four at under-20 and eight at under-21. He chose to represent Cape Verde as a senior, making his debut on 5 June 2004 in a 2–1 away loss to South Africa in the 2006 FIFA World Cup qualifiers.

== Coaching career ==
After retiring, Mendes returned to Vitória de Setúbal as youth system coordinator and under-17 coach. In 2014, he was appointed manager of amateurs AC Alcacerense where he completed his coaching licence.

Mendes returned to the Estádio do Bonfim in June 2016, again being in charge of the youth system. He then became Vitória's director of football.

On 25 January 2019, after the dismissal of Lito Vidigal, Mendes was named head coach until the end of the season, and Jorge Andrade was named as his assistant. On 26 October, following a 0–0 home draw against C.S. Marítimo that still left the team above the relegation zone, he was dismissed.

Mendes returned to management on 27 September 2021, taking charge of Amora F.C. in the Portuguese third division.

== Criminal charges ==
In March 2013, Mendes was arrested by the National Counterterrorism unit of the Judicial Police, which was competent to investigate the crime of kidnapping. He was suspected of abducting his 31-year-old ex-wife and raping her, and also of the repeated practice of domestic violence on his former partner and mother of his youngest daughter.

== Honours ==
Vitória Setúbal

- Taça de Portugal: 2004–05
- Taça da Liga: 2007–08
