= 2023–24 Sumgayit FK season =

Sumgayit
2023-24 season
- Chairman: Riad Rafiyev
- Manager: Samir Abbasov
- Stadium: Kapital Bank Arena
- Premier League: 4th
- Azerbaijan Cup: Quarterfinal vs Neftçi
- Top goalscorer: League: Casimir Ninga (7); All: Casimir Ninga (8)

The Sumgayit FK 2023–24 season was Sumgayit's thirteenth Azerbaijan Premier League season, and fourteenth season in their history.

== Season events ==
On 5 June, Sumgayit announced the return of Mekhti Dzhenetov after two seasons with Zira, to a three-year contract.

On 7 June, Sumgayit announced the return of Orkhan Sadigli, to a two-year contract from Kapaz.

On 21 June, Sumgayit announced the signing of Rovlan Muradov from Gabala to a two-year contract.

On 10 July, Sumgayit announced the signing of Kamran Guliyev from Sabah to a three-year contract.

On 17 July, Sumgayit announced the signing of Erik Sorga from Lokomotiv Plovdiv to a one-year contract, with the option of an additional year.

On 19 July, Sumgayit announced the signing of Roi Kahat from Hapoel Ironi Kiryat Shmona to a two-year contract.

On 21 July, Sumgayit announced the signing of Easah Suliman from Vitória de Guimarães to a two-year contract.

On 23 July, Sumgayit announced the signing of Octávio from CSKA 1948 Sofia to a one-year contract.

On 3 August, Sumgayit announced the signing of Trésor Mossi from KVC Westerlo to a one-year contract.

On 22 August, Sumgayit announced the signing of Abou Dosso from Bnei Sakhnin to a one-year contract, with the option of an additional year.

On 1 September, Sumgayit announced the signing of Casimir Ninga from Anorthosis Famagusta to a one-year contract.

On 11 September, Sumgayit announced the signing of Kristijan Velinovski from AP Brera to a two-year contract.

On 22 February, Sumgayit announced the signing of Jordan Rezabala from Guayaquil City on a contract until the end of 2024.

== Squad ==
As of match played 25 May 2024

No.	Name	Nationality	Position	Date of birth (age)	Signed from	Signed in	Contract ends	Apps.	Goals
Goalkeepers
1	Mekhti Dzhenetov	(Azerbaijan)	GK	18 February 1996 (aged 28)	Zira	2023	2026	112	0
15	Orkhan Sadigli	(Azerbaijan)	GK	19 March 1993 (aged 31)	Kapaz	2023	2025	6	0
32	Murad Aghamaliyev	(Azerbaijan)	GK	27 December 2006 (aged 17)	Academy	2023		0	0
36	Khayal Feyzullayev	(Azerbaijan)	GK	14 June 2005 (aged 18)	Academy	2023		1	0
Defenders
4	Easah Suliman	(Pakistan)	DF	26 January 1998 (aged 26)	Vitória	2023	2025	29	4
5	Steven Pereira	(Cape Verde)	DF	13 April 1994 (aged 30)	Maritzburg United	2022		23	1
12	Abou Dosso	(Ivory Coast)	DF	26 March 1996 (aged 28)	Bnei Sakhnin	2023	2024	31	0
14	Elvin Badalov	(Azerbaijan)	DF	14 June 1995 (aged 28)	Sabah	2019		132	4
17	Murad Khachayev	(Azerbaijan)	DF	14 April 1998 (aged 26)	Shakhtar Donetsk	2019		136	6
20	Aykhan Süleymanly	(Azerbaijan)	DF	16 January 2004 (aged 20)	on loan from Zira	2022		23	0
Midfielders
6	Vugar Mustafayev	(Azerbaijan)	MF	5 August 1994 (aged 29)	Zira	2019		129	0
7	Rovlan Muradov	(Azerbaijan)	MF	28 March 1998 (aged 26)	Gabala	2023	2025	37	4
8	Sabuhi Abdullazade	(Azerbaijan)	MF	18 December 2001 (aged 22)	Academy	2017		133	4
10	Kamran Aliyev	(Azerbaijan)	MF	15 October 1998 (aged 25)	Arsenal Tula	2023		49	4
16	Tural Axverdiyev	(Azerbaijan)	MF	13 November 2003 (aged 20)	Academy	2023		1	0
19	Roi Kahat	(Israel)	MF	12 May 1992 (aged 32)	Hapoel Ironi Kiryat Shmona	2023	2025	37	6
21	Nihad Ahmadzade	(Azerbaijan)	MF	23 July 2006 (aged 17)	Academy	2022		22	1
23	Jordan Rezabala	(Ecuador)	MF	29 February 2000 (aged 24)	Guayaquil City	2024	2024	10	2
35	Sanan Muradli	(Azerbaijan)	MF	4 January 2006 (aged 18)	Academy	2023		2	1
58	Octávio	(Brazil)	MF	29 December 1993 (aged 30)	CSKA 1948 Sofia	2023	2024	28	0
60	Trésor Mossi	(Burundi)	MF	28 August 2001 (aged 22)	UN Käerjéng 97	2023	2024	31	0
71	Masaki Murata	(Japan)	MF	29 August 1999 (aged 24)	Valmiera	2023	2024	54	1
Forwards
9	Erik Sorga	(Estonia)	FW	8 July 1999 (aged 24)	Lokomotiv Plovdiv	2023	2024	29	6
11	Casimir Ninga	(Chad)	FW	17 May 1993 (aged 31)	Anorthosis Famagusta	2023	2024	30	8
18	Kristijan Velinovski	(North Macedonia)	FW	31 May 1999 (aged 24)	AP Brera	2023	2025	5	0
30	Kamran Guliyev	(Azerbaijan)	FW	11 March 2000 (aged 24)	Sabah	2023	2026	18	3
41	Ugur Jahangirov	(Azerbaijan)	FW	22 September 2001 (aged 22)	Shamakhi	2023		1	0
Away on loan
Left during the season

== Transfers ==
=== In ===
Date	Position	Nationality	Name	From	Fee	Ref.
5 June 2023	GK	(Azerbaijan)	Mekhti Dzhenetov	Zira	Undisclosed	
7 June 2023	GK	(Azerbaijan)	Orkhan Sadigli	Kapaz	Undisclosed	
21 June 2023	MF	(Azerbaijan)	Rovlan Muradov	Gabala	Undisclosed	
10 July 2023	FW	(Azerbaijan)	Kamran Guliyev	Sabah	Undisclosed	
17 July 2023	FW	(Estonia)	Erik Sorga	Lokomotiv Plovdiv	Undisclosed	
19 July 2023	MF	(Israel)	Roi Kahat	Hapoel Ironi Kiryat Shmona	Undisclosed	
21 July 2023	DF	(Pakistan)	Easah Suliman	Vitória de Guimarães	Undisclosed	
23 July 2023	MF	(Brazil)	Octávio	CSKA 1948 Sofia	Undisclosed	
3 August 2023	MF	(Burundi)	Trésor Mossi	KVC Westerlo	Undisclosed	
22 August 2023	DF	(Ivory Coast)	Abou Dosso	Bnei Sakhnin	Undisclosed	
1 September 2023	FW	(Chad)	Casimir Ninga	Anorthosis Famagusta	Undisclosed	
11 September 2023	FW	(North Macedonia)	Kristijan Velinovski	AP Brera	Undisclosed	
22 February 2024	MF	(Ecuador)	Jordan Rezabala	Guayaquil City	Undisclosed	

== Friendlies ==
12 January 2024	Hermannstadt	3 – 0	Sumgayit	Antalya, Turkey
17:00 AZT (UTC+4)	Bejan 46'; Fonseca 49'; Mihart 80'	Report

16 January 2024	Sogdiana Jizzakh	–	Sumgayit	Antalya, Turkey
17:00 AZT (UTC+4)

== Competitions ==
=== Overview ===
Competition	First match	Last match	Starting round	Final position	Record							
Competition	First match	Last match	Starting round	Final position	Pld	W	D	L	GF	GA	GD	Win %
Premier League	5 August 2023	25 May 2024	Matchday 1	4th	36	15	12	9	37	38	−1	41.67
Azerbaijan Cup	29 November 2023	9 February 2024	Second Round	Quarterfinal	4	2	1	1	12	5	+7	50.00
Total					40	17	13	10	49	43	+6	42.50

Last updated: 25 May 2024
Source: Competitions

=== Premier League ===
==== Results summary ====
Overall								Home						Away					
Pld	W	D	L	GF	GA	GD	Pts	W	D	L	GF	GA	GD	W	D	L	GF	GA	GD
36	15	12	9	36	37	−1	57	9	5	4	15	14	+1	6	7	5	21	23	−2

Last updated: 25 May 2024.
Source: See Results

==== Results by round ====
Round	1	2	3	4	5	6	7	8	9	10	11	12	13	14	15	16	17	18	19	20	21	22	23	24	25	26	27	28	29	30	31	32	33	34	35	36
Ground	A	A (Note: matchday 3)	A (Note: matchday 4)	H (Note: matchday 5)	A (Note: matchday 6)	H (Note: matchday 7)	A (Note: matchday 8)	H (Note: matchday 9)	A (Note: matchday 10)	H (Note: matchday 2)	H	H	A	H	A	H	A	H	A	A	H	A	H	A	H	A	H	H	A	H	A	H	A	H	A	H
Result	W	W	D	L	L	D	L	W	L	W	D	W	W	D	D	L	D	W	W	D	W	D	D	L	L	W	L	W	D	D	W	W	D	W	L	W
Position	2	2	2	4	7	7	7	7	7	6	7	5	3	3	3	4	6	3	3	3	2	2	2	2	4	2	5	4	4	4	3	2	4	2	5	4

Updated to match(es) played on 25 May 2024. Source: See Results
A = Away; H = Home; W = Win; D = Draw; L = Loss

==== Results ====
5 August 2023 1	Sabail	1–4	Sumgayit	Bayil
18:30 AZT (UTC+4)	Bardea (yellow card) 34'; Gomis (yellow card) 51' (goal) 62'; Nuno (yellow card) 69'	Report	Muradov 27'; Sorga 67' (pen.); Guliyev 69'; Abdullazade (yellow card) 69' (goal) 76'; Mustafayev (yellow card) 74'	Stadium: Bayil Arena; Referee: Elcin Masiyev

19 August 2023 3	Gabala	1–2	Sumgayit	Qabala
18:00 AZT (UTC+4)	Khalaila 53'; Bakhshali (yellow card) 90'	Report	Suliman 3'; Aliyev 31'; Octávio (yellow card) 90+2'	Stadium: City Stadium; Referee: Kamranbay Rahimov

25 August 2023 4	Araz-Naxçıvan	1–1	Sumgayit	Baku
20:00 AZT (UTC+4)	Kadiri (yellow card) 45'; Manafov 73'	Report	Aliyev (yellow card) 29'; Octávio (yellow card) 49'; Sorga (yellow card) 52'; Muradov 63' (pen.); Badalov (yellow card) 75'; Suleymanli (yellow card) 90+1'	Stadium: Dalga Arena; Referee: Kamal Umudlu

2 September 2023 5	Sumgayit	0–1	Neftçi	Sumgait
20:30 AZT (UTC+4)		Report	Saief (yellow card) 8'; Matias (yellow card) 55'; Valdez 74'; Olanare (yellow card) 88'	Stadium: Kapital Bank Arena; Referee: Rauf Allahverdiyev

15 September 2023 6	Zira	1–0	Sumgayit	Zirə
17:00 AZT (UTC+4)	Zebli (red card) 11'; Isayev 45+1'; Djibrilla (yellow card) 45+1'; Kuliyev (yellow card) 52'; Ruan (yellow card) 53'	Report	Mustafayev (yellow card) 29'; Abdullazade (yellow card) 31'; Muradov (yellow card) 90+4'	Stadium: Zira Olympic Sport Complex Stadium; Referee: Kamranbay Rəhimov

23 September 2023 7	Sumgayit	0–0	Turan Tovuz	Sumgait
18:00 AZT (UTC+4)	Kahat (yellow card) 17'; Mustafayev (yellow card) 53'	Report	Guseynov (yellow card) 77'	Stadium: Kapital Bank Arena; Referee: Kamal Umudlu

29 September 2023 8	Qarabağ	5–0	Sumgayit	Baku
20:00 AZT (UTC+4)	Juninho 22', 27'; Bayramov 42' (pen.); L.Andrade 44'; Zoubir 50'; P.Andrade (yellow card) 56'	Report	Dosso (yellow card) 12'	Stadium: Azersun Arena; Referee: Aliyar Ağayev

8 October 2023 9	Sumgayit	1–0	Kapaz	Sumgait
16:30 AZT (UTC+4)	Octávio (yellow card) 36'; Kahat 62'; Muradov (yellow card) 77'; Sadigli (yellow card) 90+3'	Report	Masimov (yellow card) 77'; Juninho (yellow card) 81'; Shahverdiyev (yellow card) 83'; Taghiyev (yellow card) 85'	Stadium: Kapital Bank Arena; Referee: Emin Aliyev

21 October 2023 10	Sabah	3–1	Sumgayit	Masazır
18:00 AZT (UTC+4)	Apeh (yellow card) 34'; Irazabal 54'; Parris (yellow card) 58'; Ələsgərov 81'; Chakla (yellow card) 87'; Volkovi 90+6'	Report	Suliman 9'; Sadigli (yellow card) 87'; Aliyev (yellow card) 90+7'	Stadium: Bank Respublika Arena; Referee: Nicat İsmayıllı

25 October 2023 2	Sumgayit	1–0	Sabah	Sumgait
18:30 AZT (UTC+4)	Aliyev 4' (yellow card) 84'; Badalov (yellow card) 81'; Dzhenetov (yellow card) 85'; Suleymanli (yellow card) 88'	Report	Guliyev (yellow card) 90+4'; İmanov (yellow card) 90+6'	Stadium: Kapital Bank Arena; Referee: Raad Ahmadov
Note: Match originally scheduled for 10 August 2023.

29 October 2023 11	Sumgayit	0–0	Gabala	Sumgait
16:00 AZT (UTC+4)	Mustafayev (yellow card) 62'; Muradov (yellow card) 83'	Report	Ochihava (yellow card) 39'; Abramov (yellow card) 45'	Stadium: Kapital Bank Arena; Referee: Javid Jalilov

4 November 2023 12	Sumgayit	2–0	Araz-Naxçıvan	Sumgait
18:00 AZT (UTC+4)	Muradov 16'; Aliyev (yellow card) 30'; Kahat 69'; Mossi (yellow card) 90+5'	Report	Wanderson (yellow card) 64'; Qurbanov (yellow card) 90+2'	Stadium: Kapital Bank Arena; Referee: Elcin Məsiyev

11 November 2023 13	Neftçi	1–2	Sumgayit	Baku
16:30 AZT (UTC+4)	Aliyev (yellow card) 23'; Jaber 35'; Mirzov (yellow card) 39'; Valdez (yellow card) 51'; Matias (yellow card) 90+1'	Report	Kahat (yellow card) 17' (goal) 69'; Murata (yellow card) 48' (goal) 56'; Mustafayev (yellow card) 87'; Khachayev (yellow card) 90+1'	Stadium: Neftçi Arena; Referee: Rauf Jabarov

26 November 2023 14	Sumgayit	0–0	Zira	Sumgait
18:00 AZT (UTC+4)	Muradov (yellow card) 64'	Report		Stadium: Kapital Bank Arena; Referee: Aliyar Ağayev

2 December 2023 15	Turan Tovuz	2–2	Sumgayit	Tovuz
18:30 AZT (UTC+4)	Miller (yellow card) 34'; Pachu 49' (yellow card) 77'; John 53'; Nasirov (yellow card) 66'; Hajiyev (yellow card) 74'	Report	Badalov 6', 36'; Abdullazade (yellow card) 90+5'; Khachayev (yellow card) 90+5'	Stadium: City Stadium; Referee: Elcin Masiyev

8 December 2023 16	Sumgayit	1–6	Qarabağ	Sumgait
19:30 AZT (UTC+4)	Sorga 43'; Dosso (yellow card) 83'	Report	L.Andrade 21', 73'; Juninho 29'; Zoubir 34'; Benzia 58'; Keyta 86'	Stadium: Kapital Bank Arena; Referee: Farid Hajiyev

14 December 2023 17	Kapaz	1–1	Sumgayit	Ganja
15:30 AZT (UTC+4)	Seyidov (yellow card) 31'; Papunashvili 43'	Report	Kahat 20'; Suleymanli (yellow card) 61'; Mossi (yellow card) 83'	Stadium: City Stadium; Referee: Javid Jalilov

23 December 2023 18	Sumgayit	1–0	Sabail	Sumgait
18:30 AZT (UTC+4)	Mustafayev (yellow card) 68'; Mehremić 70' (o.g.)	Report	Lugasi (yellow card) 63'; Maharramli (yellow card) 82'	Stadium: Kapital Bank Arena; Referee: Raad Ahmadov

23 January 2024 19	Gabala	0–1	Sumgayit	Qabala
16:30 AZT (UTC+4)	Musayev (yellow card) 20'; Aouacheria (yellow card) 55'; Áfrico (yellow card) 72'	Report	Dosso (yellow card) 13'; Abdullazade (yellow card) 60'; Ninga 74' (pen.); Badalov (yellow card) 80'; Dzhenetov (yellow card) 90+7'	Stadium: City Stadium; Referee: Kamal Umudlu

28 January 2024 20	Araz-Naxçıvan	1–1	Sumgayit	Baku
15:00 AZT (UTC+4)	Abdullayev (yellow card) 6'; Igor (yellow card) 19'; Rodrigues 59'; Wanderson (yellow card) 73'	Report	Suliman 45' (yellow card) 90+5'; Aliyev (yellow card) 52'	Stadium: Dalga Arena; Referee: Alişar Ağayev

4 February 2024 21	Sumgayit	2–1	Neftçi	Sumgait
15:00 AZT (UTC+4)	Ninga 8', 37' (yellow card) 90+6'; Octávio (yellow card) 39'; Kahat (yellow card) 90+8'	Report	Eddy (yellow card) 17'; Tamás (yellow card) 22'; Aliyev (yellow card) 65'; Ozobić 90+6' (pen.)	Stadium: Kapital Bank Arena; Referee: Elcin Masiyev

13 February 2024 22	Zira	0–0	Sumgayit	Zirə
17:15 AZT (UTC+4)	Ruan (yellow card) 9'; Isayev (yellow card) 66'; Ibrahimli (yellow card) 76'	Report	Dosso (yellow card) 35'; Suliman (yellow card) 40'; Murata (yellow card) 75'	Stadium: Zira Olympic Sport Complex Stadium; Referee: Tural Qurbanov

18 February 2024 23	Sumgayit	0–0	Turan Tovuz	Sumgait
15:30 AZT (UTC+4)	Mossi (yellow card) 12'; Murata (yellow card) 73'	Report	Rzayev (yellow card) 60'	Stadium: Kapital Bank Arena; Referee: Rauf Jabarov

25 February 2024 24	Qarabağ	2–0	Sumgayit	Baku
19:00 AZT (UTC+4)	Diakhaby 52'; Benzia 83'	Report	Badalov (yellow card) 77'; Dosso (yellow card) 90+3'	Stadium: Tofiq Bahramov Republican Stadium; Referee: Nicat İsmayıllı

1 March 2024 25	Sumgayit	1–3	Kapaz	Sumgait
16:00 AZT (UTC+4)	Suliman (yellow card) 71' (goal) 80'; Octávio (yellow card) 89'	Report	Masimov 20'; Kvirkvia (yellow card) 43' (goal) 63'; Jafarov (yellow card) 90+3'; Ahmadov 90+5'	Stadium: Kapital Bank Arena; Referee: Aliyar Ağayev

8 March 2024 26	Sabail	0–1	Sumgayit	Baku
19:00 AZT (UTC+4)	Maharramli (yellow card) 54'	Report	Ninga 10'; Badalov (yellow card) 35'; Octávio (yellow card) 86'; Suleymanli (yellow card) 86'	Stadium: Bayil Arena; Referee: Tural Qurbanov

17 March 2024 27	Sumgayit	1–2	Sabah	Sumgait
19:00 AZT (UTC+4)	Ninga (yellow card) 45'; Badalov (yellow card) 71'; Octávio (yellow card) 80'; Sorga 84'; Abdullazade (yellow card) 90+5'	Report	Nuriyev 25'; Khachayev 62' (o.g.); Letić (yellow card) 90+2'	Stadium: Kapital Bank Arena; Referee: Aliyar Ağayev

31 March 2024 28	Sumgayit	1–0	Araz-Naxçıvan	Sumgait
18:00 AZT (UTC+4)	Ninga 7' (pen.) (yellow card) 88'; Murata (yellow card) 68'; Octávio (yellow card) 81'; Muradov (yellow card) 90+5'	Report		Stadium: Kapital Bank Arena; Referee: Kamranbay Rahimov

7 April 2024 29	Neftçi	1–1	Sumgayit	Baku
20:00 AZT (UTC+4)	Mahmudov 74'; Haghverdi (yellow card) 90'; Ozobić (yellow card) 90'	Report	Matias 13' (o.g.); Abdullazade (yellow card) 37'; Suliman (yellow card) 57'; Rezabala (yellow card) 57'; Dzhenetov (yellow card) 90'	Stadium: Neftçi Arena; Referee: Elcin Masiyev

12 April 2024 30	Sumgayit	0–0	Zira	Sumgait
19:00 AZT (UTC+4)	Ninga (yellow card) 42'; Abdullazade (yellow card) 64'	Report	Utzig (yellow card) 69'; Abdullayev (yellow card) 81'; Zebli (yellow card) 89'	Stadium: Kapital Bank Arena; Referee: Tural Qurbanov

19 April 2024 31	Turan Tovuz	1–4	Sumgayit	Tovuz
16:30 AZT (UTC+4)	Serrano (yellow card) 8'; John 51' (pen.) (yellow card) 67'; Marandici (yellow card) 85'; Guseynov (yellow card) 90'	Report	Aliyev 16' (o.g.); Sorga 24' (yellow card) 43'; Rezabala (yellow card) 86' (goal) 90+5'; Suliman (yellow card) 87'; Abdullazade 88'; Dzhenetov (yellow card) 90+4'	Stadium: City Stadium; Referee: Aliyar Ağayev

28 April 2024 32	Sumgayit	1–0	Qarabağ	Sumgait
20:00 AZT (UTC+4)	Kahat 70'; Badalov (yellow card) 89'; Suliman (yellow card) 90'	Report	Medina (yellow card) 39'; Isayev (yellow card) 80'; Benzia (yellow card) 90+5'	Stadium: Kapital Bank Arena; Referee: Rauf Jabarov

4 May 2024 33	Kapaz	1–1	Sumgayit	Ganja
16:30 AZT (UTC+4)	Rodrigues (yellow card) 24'; Ahmadov (yellow card) 71'; Taghiyev (yellow card) 87'; Onanuga (yellow card) 90+2' (red card) 90+2'; Júnior (yellow card) 90+2' (yellow-red card) 90+6'	Report	Muradov (yellow card) 24'; Mustafayev (yellow card) 24' (yellow-red card) 90+6'; Rezabala 80'	Stadium: City Stadium; Referee: Tural Qurbanov

12 May 2024 34	Sumgayit	2–1	Sabail	Sumgait
19:30 AZT (UTC+4)	Octávio (yellow card) 13'; Ninga 41' (pen.), 45' (yellow card) 51'; Murata (yellow card) 77'	Report	Najah (yellow card) 21'; Abdullazade (yellow card) 68'; Mehremić (yellow card) 82'; Ramalingom 90+5'	Stadium: Kapital Bank Arena; Referee: Raad Ahmadov

18 May 2024 35	Sabah	2–0	Sumgayit	Masazır
17:00 AZT (UTC+4)	Khachayev 35' (o.g.); Nuriyev 90+1'; Hadhoudi (yellow card) 90+1'	Report	Sorga (yellow card) 58'; Badalov (yellow card) 74'	Stadium: Bank Respublika Arena; Referee: Ingilab Mammadov

25 May 2024 36	Sumgayit	1–0	Gabala	Sumgait
19:00 AZT (UTC+4)	Aliyev (yellow card) 27'; Sorga 52'; Mustafayev (yellow card) 82'; Abdullazade (yellow card) 90+3'	Report	Isaiah (yellow card) 22'; Ahmadov (yellow card) 55'; Ramazanov (yellow card) 62'; Allach (yellow card) 83'	Stadium: Kapital Bank Arena; Referee: Tural Qurbanov

==== League table ====
Pos	Team	Pld	W	D	L	GF	GA	GD	Pts	Qualification or relegation
2	Zira	36	16	10	10	33	22	+11	58 (Note: Zira are ahead of Sabah on head-to-head points: Zira 1–0 Sabah, Sabah 0–1 Zira, Zira 0–1 Sabah, Sabah 0–1 Zira)	Qualification for the Europa League first qualifying round (Note: The 2023–24 Azerbaijan Cup winners qualified for the Europa League first qualifying round. Since the cup winners (Qarabağ) qualified based on league position, the Europa League spot was passed to the second-placed team, and the second Conference League second round spot was passed to the fourth-placed team.)
3	Sabah	36	17	7	12	50	40	+10	58	Qualification for the Conference League second qualifying round
4	Sumgayit	36	15	12	9	37	38	−1	57	Qualification for the Conference League second qualifying round
5	Neftçi	36	16	8	12	51	40	+11	56	
6	Turan Tovuz	36	13	9	14	53	53	0	48	

Source: Soccerway
Rules for classification: 1) Points; 2) Head-to-head points; 3) Head-to-head goal difference; 4) Head-to-head goals scored; 5) Head-to-head away goals scored (only if two teams); 6) Goal difference; 7) Goals scored.

=== Azerbaijan Cup ===
29 November 2023 Second Round	Lerik	0–6	Sumgayit	Sumgait
18:00 AZT (UTC+4)		Report	Muradov 19'; Muradli 41'; Sorga 54'; Aliyev 68', 80'; Ahmadzade 77' (pen.)	Stadium: Kapital Bank Arena; Attendance: 300; Referee: Nijat Ismailli

18 December 2023 Last 16	Sumgayit	3–1	Karvan	Sumgait
17:00 AZT (UTC+4)	Mustafayev (yellow card) 30'; Khachayev (yellow card) 42'; Muradov (yellow card) 45' (goal) 88'; Aliyev 55'; Sorga 82'	Report	Mushtagov 65'	Stadium: Kapital Bank Arena; Attendance: 130; Referee: Kamranbay Rahimov

31 January 2024 Quarterfinal 1st leg	Sumgayit	2–3	Neftçi	Sumgait
19:00 AZT (UTC+4)	Mossi (yellow card) 41'; Dzhenetov (yellow card) 45+2'; Badalov 60'; Aliyev (yellow card) 71'; Ninga 89'; Kahat (yellow card) 90+3'	Report	Eddy (yellow card) 27'; Bogomolsky 29'; Mahmudov 44' (pen.), 45+2'; Valdez (yellow card) 90+4'; Jafarov (yellow card) 90+5'	Stadium: Kapital Bank Arena; Attendance: 1,200; Referee: Raşad Ahmadov

9 February 2024 Quarterfinal 2nd leg	Neftçi	1–1 (4–3 agg.)	Sumgayit	Baku
19:00 AZT (UTC+4)	Ozobić 26'; Shinyashiki (yellow card) 32'; Qarayev (yellow card) 45+2'; Moreno (yellow card) 87'; Lebon (yellow card) 90+5'	Report	Dosso (yellow card) 30'; Kahat 39' (yellow card) 90+6'; Suliman (yellow card) 90'; Abdullazade (yellow card) 90+6'	Stadium: Neftçi Arena; Attendance: 1,000; Referee: Kamal Umudlu

== Squad statistics ==
As of match played 25 May 2024

=== Appearances and goals ===
No.	Pos	Nat	Player	Total		Premier League		Azerbaijan Cup	
No.	Pos	Nat	Player	Apps	Goals	Apps	Goals	Apps	Goals
1	GK	(Azerbaijan) AZE	Mekhti Dzhenetov	35	0	33	0	2	0
4	DF	(Pakistan) PAK	Easah Suliman	29	4	27	4	2	0
6	MF	(Azerbaijan) AZE	Vugar Mustafayev	20	1	15+4	0	1	1
7	MF	(Azerbaijan) AZE	Rovlan Muradov	38	5	34	3	4	2
8	MF	(Azerbaijan) AZE	Sabuhi Abdullazade	39	2	31+4	2	4	0
9	FW	(Estonia) EST	Erik Sorga	30	7	14+13	5	1+2	2
10	MF	(Azerbaijan) AZE	Kamran Aliyev	36	4	20+11	2	1+4	2
11	FW	(Chad) CHA	Casimir Ninga	30	7	22+6	7	2	0
12	DF	(Ivory Coast) CIV	Abou Dosso	32	0	27+2	0	1+2	0
14	DF	(Azerbaijan) AZE	Elvin Badalov	35	2	32	1	3	1
15	GK	(Azerbaijan) AZE	Orkhan Sadigli	4	0	2	0	2	0
16	MF	(Azerbaijan) AZE	Tural Axverdiyev	1	0	0	0	0+1	0
17	DF	(Azerbaijan) AZE	Murad Khachayev	40	0	36	0	3+1	0
18	FW	(North Macedonia) MKD	Kristijan Velinovski	5	0	0+4	0	1	0
19	MF	(Israel) ISR	Roi Kahat	37	7	34+1	6	1+1	1
20	DF	(Azerbaijan) AZE	Aykhan Suleymanli	20	0	3+13	0	3+1	0
21	MF	(Azerbaijan) AZE	Nihad Ahmadzade	14	1	1+10	0	1+2	1
23	MF	(Ecuador) ECU	Jordan Rezabala	10	2	4+6	2	0	0
30	FW	(Azerbaijan) AZE	Kamran Guliyev	19	3	3+13	1	3	2
35	MF	(Azerbaijan) AZE	Sanan Muradli	3	1	0+1	0	2	1
36	GK	(Azerbaijan) AZE	Khayal Feyzullayev	1	0	1	0	0	0
41	FW	(Azerbaijan) AZE	Ugur Jahangirov	1	0	0	0	0+1	0
58	MF	(Brazil) BRA	Octávio	29	0	14+12	0	2+1	0
60	MF	(Burundi) BDI	Trésor Mossi	32	0	12+16	0	3+1	0
71	MF	(Japan) JPN	Masaki Murata	38	1	31+4	1	2+1	0
Players away on loan:
Players who left Sumgayit during the season:

=== Goal scorers ===
Place	Position	Nation	Number	Name	Premier League	Azerbaijan Cup	Total
1	FW	(Chad)	11	Casimir Ninga	7	1	8
2	MF	(Israel)	19	Roi Kahat	6	1	7
2	FW	(Estonia)	9	Erik Sorga	5	2	7
4	MF	(Azerbaijan)	7	Rovlan Muradov	3	2	5
5	DF	(Pakistan)	4	Easah Suliman	4	0	4
6	MF	(Azerbaijan)	10	Kamran Aliyev	2	1	3
6	FW	(Azerbaijan)	30	Kamran Guliyev	1	2	3
6				Own goal	3	0	3
9	MF	(Azerbaijan)	8	Sabuhi Abdullazade	2	0	2
9	MF	(Ecuador)	23	Jordan Rezabala	2	0	2
9	DF	(Azerbaijan)	14	Elvin Badalov	1	1	2
12	MF	(Japan)	71	Masaki Murata	1	0	1
12	MF	(Azerbaijan)	35	Sanan Muradli	0	1	1
12	MF	(Azerbaijan)	21	Nihad Ahmadzade	0	1	1
				TOTALS	37	12	49

=== Clean sheets ===
Place	Position	Nation	Number	Name	Premier League	Azerbaijan Cup	Total
1	GK	(Azerbaijan)	1	Mekhti Dzhenetov	13	0	13
2	GK	(Azerbaijan)	15	Orkhan Sadigli	1	1	2
3	GK	(Azerbaijan)	36	Khayal Feyzullayev	1	0	1
				TOTALS	15	1	16

=== Disciplinary record ===
Number	Nation	Position	Name	Premier League		Azerbaijan Cup		Total	
Number	Nation	Position	Name	Yellow card	Red card	Yellow card	Red card	Yellow card	Red card
1	(Azerbaijan)	GK	Mekhti Dzhenetov	4	0	1	0	5	0
4	(Pakistan)	DF	Easah Suliman	6	0	1	0	7	0
6	(Azerbaijan)	MF	Vugar Mustafayev	9	1	1	0	10	1
7	(Azerbaijan)	MF	Rovlan Muradov	6	0	1	0	7	0
8	(Azerbaijan)	MF	Sabuhi Abdullazade	8	0	1	0	9	0
9	(Estonia)	FW	Erik Sorga	3	0	0	0	3	0
10	(Azerbaijan)	MF	Kamran Aliyev	6	0	1	0	7	0
11	(Chad)	FW	Casimir Ninga	5	0	0	0	5	0
12	(Ivory Coast)	DF	Abou Dosso	4	0	1	0	5	0
14	(Azerbaijan)	DF	Elvin Badalov	8	0	0	0	8	0
15	(Azerbaijan)	GK	Orkhan Sadigli	2	0	0	0	2	0
17	(Azerbaijan)	DF	Murad Khachayev	2	0	1	0	3	0
19	(Israel)	MF	Roi Kahat	3	0	2	0	5	0
20	(Azerbaijan)	DF	Aykhan Suleymanli	4	0	0	0	4	0
23	(Ecuador)	MF	Jordan Rezabala	2	0	0	0	2	0
58	(Brazil)	MF	Octávio	9	0	0	0	9	0
60	(Burundi)	MF	Trésor Mossi	4	0	1	0	5	0
71	(Japan)	MF	Masaki Murata	5	0	0	0	5	0
Players who left Sumgayit during the season:
			TOTALS	90	1	11	0	101	1
