= 2023–24 Azerbaijan Cup =

Tournament details
- Country: Azerbaijan

Final positions
- Champions: Qarabağ
- Runners-up: Zira

Tournament statistics
- Matches played: 38
- Goals scored: 143 (3.76 per match)
- All statistics correct as of 2 June 2024.

The 2023–24 Azerbaijan Cup was the 32nd season of the annual cup competition in Azerbaijan. The winners qualified for the 2024–25 UEFA Europa League first qualifying round.

Qarabağ won the cup (their eighth Azerbaijan Cup win) on 2 June 2024, defeating Zira 2 – 1 in the final. Since they qualified based on league position, the Europa League spot was passed to the second-placed team of the 2023–24 Azerbaijan Premier League.

== Teams ==
Access list for 2023–24 Azerbaijani Cup
	Teams entering in this round	Teams advancing from previous round
First round (14 teams)	14 Azerbaijan Second League teams	—N/a
Second round (22 teams)	10 Azerbaijan First League teams; 5 Azerbaijan Premier League teams	7 winners from the first round
Last 16 (16 teams)	5 Azerbaijan Premier League teams	11 winners from the second round
Quarter-finals (8 teams)	—N/a	8 winners from the last 16
Semi-finals (4 teams)	—N/a	4 winners from the quarter-finals
Final (2 teams)	—N/a	2 winners from the semi-finals

== First round ==
18 November 2023 4	Füzuli	0 – 1	Lerik	Baku
13:00 AZT (UTC+4)	Akhundov (yellow card) 33'; Huseynov (yellow card) 90+4'	Report	Agazadeh (yellow card) 2'; Guluzadeh 58' (yellow card) 68'	Stadium: ASK Arena; Attendance: 80; Referee: Kamran Aliyev

18 November 2023 5	Qusar	0 – 0 (a.e.t.) (4 – 5 p)	Shahdag Qusar	Sumgait
13:00 AZT (UTC+4)	Agalarov (yellow card) 27'; V.Huseynov (yellow card) 45+1'; Tagiyev (yellow card) 52'; Agayev (yellow card) 101'	Report	Amirguliyev (yellow card) 40'	Stadium: Kapital Bank Arena; Attendance: 70; Referee: Inqilab Mammadov
	Penalties
	A.Huseynov (penalty scored); Karakhanov (penalty scored); V.Huseynov (penalty scored); Poladov (penalty missed); Alibabayev (penalty scored)		T.Gurbatov (penalty scored); Amirguliyev (penalty scored); Seyidov (penalty scored); Agalarov (penalty scored); K.Gurbatov (penalty scored)

18 November 2023 2	Göygöl	2 – 1	Dinamo	Goygol
14:30 AZT (UTC+4)	Mursalov (yellow card) 48'; Mammadov 76'; Ashrafli 77'	Report	Jafarov (yellow card) 60' (yellow-red card) 84'; Demirov (yellow card) 75'; Seyidov 76'	Stadium: Goygol OIK stadium Attendance: 50; Referee: Emin Aliyev

19 November 2023 7	Ağdaş	0 – 2 (a.e.t.)	Jabrayil	Agdash
14:00 AZT (UTC+4)	Abubekirov (yellow card) 101'; Nasirov (yellow card) 120+2'; Salmanov (yellow card) FT	Report	Süleymanli (yellow card) 51'; Orujov (yellow card) 92'; Hashimli (yellow card) 112'; Ahmadov 116' (pen.); Demirov 120+'	Stadium: City Stadium; Attendance: 600; Referee: Ali Aliyev

19 November 2023 3	Sheky City	1 – 2	Kür-Araz	Shaki
14:00 AZT (UTC+4)	Mustafayev (yellow card) 16'; Rajabli (yellow card) 74'; Soltanov (yellow card) 75'; Ramazanov (yellow card) 75'; Mirbabayev 82' (o.g.); Rauflu (yellow card) 90+5'	Report	Musazadeh (yellow card) 19'; Khalilli 51', 73' (red card) 90+5'; Mammadov (yellow card) 52'; Askerov (yellow card) 78'	Stadium: City Stadium; Attendance: 750; Referee: Farid Hajiyev

19 November 2023 6	Baku Sportinq	6 – 0	Kürmük Qax	Binə
14:30 AZT (UTC+4)	Guliyev 20'; Najafov 27'; Rustamov (penalty missed) 31'; Khalilov 38', 45', 89'; Rahimov 55'	Report	Jabbarov (yellow card) 30'	Stadium: Bine Stadium; Attendance: 50; Referee: Ravan Hamzazade

20 November 2023 1	Shafa Baku	1 – 1 (5 – 3 p)	Shamkir	Binə
14:30 AZT (UTC+4)	Jumshudov 25' (pen.) (yellow card) 93'; Karimov (yellow card) 72'; Jamalzadeh (yellow card) 76'; J.Aliyev (yellow card) 76'; Yusifov (penalty missed) 96'; Valehov (yellow card) 100'; L.Aliyev (yellow card) 112'	Report	Ganbarov (penalty missed) 52'; Namazov 58'; Rahimov (red card) 76'; Bayramli (yellow card) 76'; Zeynalov (yellow card) 76'; Ismayilov (yellow card) 97'	Stadium: Bine Stadium; Attendance: 60; Referee: Rashad Ahmadov
	Penalties
	Jumshudov (penalty scored); Guliyev (penalty scored); L.Aliyev (penalty scored); Jamalzadeh (penalty scored); Valehov (penalty scored)		Ganbarov (penalty scored); Ahmadli (penalty scored); Ismayilov (penalty missed); Ibrahimov (penalty scored)

== Second round ==
On 27 November, the AFFA published the list of referee appointments for the first legs of the Second Round.

28 November 2023 11	Araz-Saatlı	1 – 4	İrəvan	Saatlı
13:30 AZT (UTC+4)	Sabbaghi (yellow card) 9'; Ben (yellow card) 45'; Ahmadov (yellow card) 45+2'; Taghizadeh (yellow card) 73'; Avazov 79' (pen.)	Report	Yunuszade 4'; Karimzadeh (yellow card) 16'; Taghiyev 27'; Asgarov 45+3' (pen.); Agjabayov 70'; Ayralov (yellow card) 84'	Stadium: OIK Stadium; Attendance: 150; Referee: Kemal Umudlu

28 November 2023 15	Karvan	1 – 0	Difai Agsu	Yevlakh
13:30 AZT (UTC+4)	Voronsov 72'	Report	Bagirov (yellow card) 13'; Kahramanli (yellow card) 67'; Rahimov (red card) 69'; Gambarli (yellow card) 69'; Huseynov (yellow card) 88'	Stadium: City Stadium; Attendance: 750; Referee: Rauf Allahverdiyev

28 November 2023 18	MOIK Baku	4 – 0	Jabrayil	Binə
13:30 AZT (UTC+4)	Valiyev (yellow card) 16' (goal) 73'; Zeynalli 37' (pen.); Abbaszade 45+2', 86'; Bayramov (yellow card) 55'	Report	Novruzov (yellow card) 35'; Aliyev (yellow card) 41'; Ahmadov (yellow card) 57'; Shabiyev (yellow card) 61'	Stadium: Bine Stadium; Attendance: 100; Referee: Inqilab Mammadov

28 November 2023 8	Shafa Baku	0 – 7	Sabail	Baku
15:00 AZT (UTC+4)	Jumshudov (yellow card) 36'; Karimov (yellow card) 70'	Report	Abdullayev 10'; Lugasi 11'; Mehremić 20'; Qarayev 25'; Yunanov 39', 78'; Ramalingom 88'	Stadium: Bayil Arena; Attendance: 110; Referee: Ali Aliyev

28 November 2023 10	Turan Tovuz	5 – 1	Göygöl	Tovuz
17:00 AZT (UTC+4)	Guseynov 4', 45'; Pusi 41', 88'; Guliyev (yellow card) 45' (goal) 90+2' (pen.); Nasirov (yellow card) 80'	Report	Jalilov 38' (pen.); Mammadov (yellow card) 90'; Mursalov (yellow card) 90+1'	Stadium: City Stadium; Attendance: 1,500; Referee: Tural Gurbanov

29 November 2023 17	Kapaz	2 – 0 (a.e.t.)	Baku Sporting	Tovuz
13:30 AZT (UTC+4)	Shahverdiyev (yellow card) 87'; Musayev 99'; Martin Júnior 107'	Report	Khalilov (yellow card) 74'	Stadium: City Stadium; Attendance: 100; Referee: Aliyar Agayev

29 November 2023 16	Shahdag Qusar	0 – 1	Qaradağ Lökbatan	Shamakhi
13:30 AZT (UTC+4)	Gorchiyev (yellow card) 39'; Shaguliyev (yellow card) 73'	Report	Jafarov (yellow card) 53'; Mustafayev 60'	Stadium: City Stadium; Attendance: 20; Referee: Ravan Hamzazade

29 November 2023 12	Kür-Araz	1 – 6	Araz-Naxçıvan	Baku
15:00 AZT (UTC+4)	Eln.Mammadov (yellow card) 51'; Abbasov 53' (yellow card) 58'; Huseynov (yellow card) 55'; Elk.Mammadov (yellow card) 55'; Aliyev (yellow card) 84'	Report	Kadiri 21'; Suleymanov 47', 87', 90+2'; Alizada (yellow card) 49'; Ahmadov (yellow card) 54'; O.Aliyev 65', 88'	Stadium: Dalga Arena; Attendance: 25; Referee: Rauf Jabarov

29 November 2023 14	Lerik	0 – 6	Sumgayit	Sumgait
18:00 AZT (UTC+4)		Report	Muradov 19'; Muradli 41'; Sorga 54'; Guliyev 68', 80'; Ahmadzade 77' (pen.)	Stadium: Kapital Bank Arena; Attendance: 300; Referee: Nijat Ismailli

30 November 2023 9	Zagatala	0 – 1	Shamakhi	Zaqatala
13:30 AZT (UTC+4)	Umera (yellow card) 36'; Gadirzadeh (yellow card) 56'; Nuruyev (yellow card) 73'; Ismayilov (yellow card) 78' (red card) FT; Shabanov (yellow card) FT; Teymurov (red card) FT	Report	Maharramli (yellow card) 7'; Zamanov 19' (yellow card) 90+5' (red card) FT; Ahmedov (yellow card) 66'; Aghazade (yellow card) 71'; Valiyev (yellow card) 90+3'	Stadium: City Stadium; Attendance: 250; Referee: Farid Hajiyev

30 November 2023 13	İmişli	1 – 0	Mingəçevir	Imishli
13:30 AZT (UTC+4)	Isayev (yellow card) 22' (goal) 87' (pen.); Morgan (yellow card) 24'; Nazarli (yellow card) 37'; Mahmudov (yellow card) 75'; Tisdell (yellow card) 77'	Report	Bayramov (yellow card) 26' (yellow-red card) 90+2'; Huseynov (yellow card) 52'	Stadium: Heydar Aliyev Stadium; Attendance: 650; Referee: Kamran Aliyev

== Last 16 ==
18 December 2023 25	Kapaz	3 – 4	Sabah	Ganja
14:00 AZT (UTC+4)	Niane 35' (pen.), 44', 76' (yellow card) 83'; Masimov (yellow card) 45'; Khvalko (yellow card) 64'; Rodrigues (yellow card) 90'	Report	Thill 14' (yellow card) 17'; Sekidika 23'; Apeh 40'; Chakla (yellow card) 45+2'; Seydiyev 89'	Stadium: City Stadium; Attendance: 200; Referee: Rəşad Ahmadov

18 December 2023 23	Sumgayit	3 – 1	Karvan	Sumgait
17:00 AZT (UTC+4)	Mustafayev (yellow card) 30'; Khachayev (yellow card) 42'; Muradov (yellow card) 45' (goal) 88'; Aliyev 55'; Sorga 82'	Report	Mushtagov 65'	Stadium: Kapital Bank Arena; Attendance: 130; Referee: Kamranbay Rahimov

19 December 2023 21	İrəvan	2 – 8	Araz-Naxçıvan	Baku
13:00 AZT (UTC+4)	Qanbarov 16'; Asgarov 37'; Muradbayli (yellow card) 79'	Report	Ngando 24', 43', 45+4' (pen.); O.Aliyev 25', 51'; Z.Aliyev (yellow card) 55'; Kuzmanović 73'; Mashike 80', 83'	Stadium: ASK Arena; Attendance: 70; Referee: Javid Jalilov

19 December 2023 22	İmişli	0 – 1	Gabala	Qabala
16:00 AZT (UTC+4)	Isayev (yellow card) 51'; Tamazov (yellow card) 55'; Mammadov (yellow card) 90'	Report	Isgandarov (yellow card) 64'; Bakhshali 90+3'	Stadium: City Stadium; Attendance: 70; Referee: Emin Aliyev

20 December 2023 19	Sabail	6 – 0	Shamakhi	Baku
14:00 AZT (UTC+4)	Yunanov 23' (pen.), 45'; Nuno 50'; Abdullazade 56', 80' (yellow card) 75'; Mehremić 90+2'	Report	Alasgarov (yellow card) 32'	Stadium: Bayil Arena; Attendance: 100; Referee: Tural Gurbanov

20 December 2023 20	Zira	2 – 1	Turan Tovuz	Zirə
17:00 AZT (UTC+4)	Soumah (yellow card) 64'; Chantakias (yellow card) 78'; Pachtmann 82'; Akhmedzade 89' (yellow card) 90'; Kulach (yellow card) 90+9'	Report	John 4'; Najafov (yellow card) 83'; Miller (yellow card) 90'	Stadium: Zira Olympic Sport Complex Stadium; Attendance: 800; Referee: Inqilab Mammadov

21 December 2023 26	Qarabağ	1 – 0	MOIK Baku	Khankendi
14:00 AZT (UTC+4)	Akhundzade 90+5'	Report	Ahmadzadeh (yellow card) 82'	Stadium: Khankendi Stadium; Attendance: 4,590; Referee: Ali Aliyev

21 December 2023 24	Neftçi	4 – 0	Qaradağ Lökbatan	Baku
18:00 AZT (UTC+4)	Olanare 23' (pen.); Qayali 73' (o.g.); Bogomolsky 78'; Shinyashiki 81'; Valdez (yellow card) 90'	Report	Ismayilov (yellow card) 51'; Farajov (yellow card) 71'	Stadium: Neftçi Arena; Attendance: 662; Referee: Kamran Aliyev

== Quarter-finals ==
30 January 2024 1st leg	Sabail	1 – 2	Zira	Baku
15:00 AZT (UTC+4)	Haziyev (yellow card) 28'; Ramalingom 70'	Report	Najah 48' (o.g.); Ruan 60'	Stadium: Bayil Arena; Attendance: 200; Referee: Inqilab Mammadov

8 February 2024 2nd leg	Zira	3 – 0 (5 – 1 agg.)	Sabail	Zirə
17:00 AZT (UTC+4)	Ibrahim 4' (yellow card) 26'; Kuliyev (yellow card) 32'; Sadykhov 42'; Utzig 74' (yellow card) 88'	Report	Bardea (yellow card) 90+2'	Stadium: Zira Olympic Sport Complex Stadium; Attendance: 800; Referee: Elçin Masiyev

30 January 2024 1st leg	Sabah	1 – 7	Qarabağ	Masazır
19:00 AZT (UTC+4)	Volkovi (yellow card) 49'; Sekidika 63'	Report	Guseynov (yellow card) 12'; Keyta 21'; Juninho 28', 55'; Akhundzade 45+3'; Zoubir 77', 90+3'; Diakhaby 88'	Stadium: Bank Respublika Arena; Attendance: 1,575; Referee: Elçin Məsiyev

8 February 2024 2nd leg	Qarabağ	3 – 4 (10 – 5 agg.)	Sabah	Baku
20:00 AZT (UTC+4)	Keyta 30'; Silva (yellow card) 38'; Diakhaby 62'; Hadhoudi 74' (o.g.); Richard (red card) 77'	Report	Christian 5'; Margaritha 27'; Letić (yellow card) 37'; Belfodil 58', 69' (pen.)	Stadium: Tofiq Bahramov Republican Stadium; Attendance: 750; Referee: Rauf Allahverdiyev

31 January 2024 1st leg	Araz-Naxçıvan	1 – 1	Gabala	Baku
16:00 AZT (UTC+4)	Mashike 45+1'; Wanderson (yellow card) 62'	Report	Tetteh 11'; Khalaila (yellow card) 29'; Mammadov (yellow card) 43'; Áfrico (red card) 77'	Stadium: Dalga Arena; Attendance: 180; Referee: Rauf Allahverdiyev

9 February 2024 2nd leg	Gabala	2 – 0 (3 – 1 agg.)	Araz-Naxçıvan	Qabala
16:00 AZT (UTC+4)	Akel (yellow card) 23'; Khalaila 39'; Abbasov 42'; Mammadov (yellow card) 90+2'; Atangana (yellow card) 90+3'	Report	Rodrigues (yellow card) 14'; Igor (yellow card) 16'; Kadiri (yellow card) 74'; Wanderson (yellow card) 90+5'	Stadium: City Stadium; Attendance: 200; Referee: İnqilab Mammadov

31 January 2024 1st leg	Sumgayit	2 – 3	Neftçi	Sumgait
19:00 AZT (UTC+4)	Mossi (yellow card) 41'; Dzhenetov (yellow card) 45+2'; Badalov 60'; Aliyev (yellow card) 71'; Ninga 89'; Kahat (yellow card) 90+3'	Report	Eddy (yellow card) 27'; Bogomolsky 29'; Mahmudov 44' (pen.), 45+2'; Valdez (yellow card) 90+4'; Jafarov (yellow card) 90+5'	Stadium: Kapital Bank Arena; Attendance: 1,200; Referee: Raşad Ahmadov

9 February 2024 2nd leg	Neftçi	1 – 1 (4 – 3 agg.)	Sumgayit	Baku
19:00 AZT (UTC+4)	Ozobić 26'; Shinyashiki (yellow card) 32'; Qarayev (yellow card) 45+2'; Moreno (yellow card) 87'; Lebon (yellow card) 90+5'	Report	Dosso (yellow card) 30'; Kahat 39' (yellow card) 90+6'; Suliman (yellow card) 90'; Abdullazade (yellow card) 90+6'	Stadium: Neftçi Arena; Attendance: 1,000; Referee: Kamal Umudlu

== Semi-finals ==
2 April 2024 1st leg	Neftçi	0 – 4	Qarabağ	Baku
20:00 AZT (UTC+4)	Matias (yellow card) 13'; Valdez (yellow card) 31'; Mahmudov (yellow card) 64'; Eddy (yellow card) 65'	Report	Bayramov 14' (pen.), 29'; Romão (yellow card) 15'; Janković 38'; Benzia (yellow card) 65'; Akhundzade 86'	Stadium: Neftçi Arena; Attendance: 5,750; Referee: Ravan Hamzazade

24 April 2024 2nd leg	Qarabağ	4 – 1 (8 – 1 agg.)	Neftçi	Baku
20:00 AZT (UTC+4)	Juninho 16', 69'; Benzia (yellow card) 54'; Qarayev 62' (o.g.); Akhundzade 78'	Report	Conteh (yellow card) 42'; Mirzov 64'; Brkić (yellow card) 70'; Matias (yellow card) 74'	Stadium: Tofiq Bahramov Republican Stadium; Attendance: 3,000; Referee: Aliyar Agayev

3 April 2024 1st leg	Zira	2 – 1	Gabala	Zirə
19:30 AZT (UTC+4)	Soumah 51'; Utzig 68'	Report	Abbasov (yellow card) 33'; Qirtimov (yellow card) 45+1'; Abu Akel 90' (yellow card) 90'	Stadium: Zira Olympic Sport Complex Stadium; Attendance: 600; Referee: İnqilab Məmmədov

24 April 2024 2nd leg	Gabala	0 – 2 (1 – 4 agg.)	Zira	Qabala
17:00 AZT (UTC+4)	Mammadov (yellow card) 20'	Report	Kulach (yellow card) 19' (goal) 62'; Zebli (yellow card) 78'; Bayramov (yellow card) 82'; Utzig 85'	Stadium: City Stadium; Attendance: 850; Referee: Tural Gurbanov

== Final ==
2 June 2024	Zira	1 – 2	Qarabağ	Baku
20:00 AZT (UTC+4)	Ibrahimli 58'; Sadykhov (yellow card) 59'; Ruan (yellow card) 76'	Report	Juninho 42' (yellow card) 85'; Zoubir 62'; Keyta (yellow card) 90+5'	Stadium: Dalga Arena; Attendance: 3,000; Referee: Ravan Hamzazada

== Scorers ==
As of match played 2 June 2024

5 goals:

- (Brazil) Juninho - Qarabağ

4 goals:

- (Azerbaijan) Orkhan Aliyev - Araz-Naxçıvan
- (Azerbaijan) Nariman Akhundzade - Qarabağ
- (Azerbaijan) Amil Yunanov - Sabail

3 goals:

- (Azerbaijan) Nijat Suleymanov - Araz-Naxçıvan
- (Democratic Republic of the Congo) Elvis Mashike - Araz-Naxçıvan
- (France) Axel Ngando - Araz-Naxçıvan
- (Azerbaijan) Muhammad Khalilov - Baku Sporting
- (Mali) Adama Niane - Kapaz
- (France) Abdellah Zoubir - Qarabağ
- (Brazil) Raphael Utzig - Zira

2 goals:

- (Azerbaijan) Elariz Khalilli - Kür-Araz
- (Azerbaijan) Javidan Abbaszade - MOIK Baku
- (Azerbaijan) Emin Mahmudov - Neftçi
- (Belarus) Yegor Bogomolsky - Neftçi
- (Azerbaijan) Toral Bayramov - Qarabağ
- (France) Adama Diakhaby - Qarabağ
- (France) Hamidou Keyta - Qarabağ
- (Algeria) Ishak Belfodil - Sabah
- (Nigeria) Jesse Sekidika - Sabah
- (Azerbaijan) Rufat Abdullazade - Sabail
- (Bosnia and Herzegovina) Adi Mehremić - Sabail
- (Madagascar) Alexandre Ramalingom - Sabail
- (Azerbaijan) Kamran Guliyev - Sumgayit
- (Azerbaijan) Rovlan Muradov - Sumgayit
- (Estonia) Erik Sorga - Sumgayit
- (Albania) Belajdi Pusi - Turan Tovuz
- (Russia) Aykhan Guseynov - Turan Tovuz

1 goals:

- (Bosnia and Herzegovina) Mićo Kuzmanović - Araz-Naxçıvan
- (Ghana) Mohammed Kadiri - Araz-Naxçıvan
- (Azerbaijan) Ravan Avazov - Araz-Saatlı
- (Azerbaijan) Ulvi Guliyev - Baku Sporting
- (Azerbaijan) Royal Najafov - Baku Sporting
- (Azerbaijan) Vugar Rahimov - Baku Sporting
- (Azerbaijan) Valeh Seyidov - Dinamo
- (Azerbaijan) Mehrac Bakhshali - Gabala
- (Azerbaijan) Urfan Abbasov - Gabala
- (Ghana) Samuel Tetteh - Gabala
- (Israel) Fares Abu Akel - Gabala
- (Israel) Osama Khalaila - Gabala
- (Azerbaijan) Vugar Ashrafli - Göygöl
- (Azerbaijan) Ulvi Jalilov - Göygöl
- (Azerbaijan) Ziyabil Mammadov - Göygöl
- (Azerbaijan) Arsen Agjabayov - İrəvan
- (Azerbaijan) Vusal Qanbarov - İrəvan
- (Azerbaijan) Javid Taghiyev - İrəvan
- (Azerbaijan) Elvin Yunuszade - İrəvan
- (Azerbaijan) Hazrat Isayev - İmişli
- (Azerbaijan) Tapdig Ahmadov - Jabrayil
- (Azerbaijan) Elvin Demirov - Jabrayil
- (Azerbaijan) Nemat Musayev - Kapaz
- (Brazil) Martin Júnior - Kapaz
- (Azerbaijan) Izzat Mushtagov - Karvan
- (Azerbaijan) Ruslan Voronsov - Karvan
- (Azerbaijan) Ramazan Abbasov - Kür-Araz
- (Azerbaijan) Ravan Guluzadeh - Lerik
- (Azerbaijan) Elvin Valiyev - MOIK Baku
- (Azerbaijan) Isa Zeynalli - MOIK Baku
- (Azerbaijan) Filip Ozobić - Neftçi
- (Brazil) Andre Shinyashiki - Neftçi
- (Nigeria) Aaron Olanare - Neftçi
- (Russia) Reziuan Mirzov - Neftçi
- (Montenegro) Marko Janković - Qarabağ
- (Russia) Sultan Mustafayev - Qaradağ Lökbatan
- (Azerbaijan) Amin Seydiyev - Sabah
- (Brazil) Christian - Sabah
- (Curaçao) Jearl Margaritha - Sabah
- (Luxembourg) Vincent Thill - Sabah
- (Nigeria) Emmanuel Apeh - Sabah
- (Azerbaijan) Samir Abdullayev - Sabail
- (Azerbaijan) Taleh Qarayev - Sabail
- (Israel) Yadin Lugasi - Sabail
- (Portugal) Pedro Nuno - Sabail
- (Azerbaijan) Elgun Namazov - Şəmkir
- (Azerbaijan) Sahib Jumshudov - Shafa Baku
- (Azerbaijan) Emin Zamanov - Shamakhi
- (Azerbaijan) Nihad Ahmadzade - Sumgayit
- (Azerbaijan) Kamran Aliyev - Sumgayit
- (Azerbaijan) Elvin Badalov - Sumgayit
- (Azerbaijan) Sanan Muradli - Sumgayit
- (Chad) Casimir Ninga - Sumgayit
- (Israel) Roi Kahat - Sumgayit
- (Azerbaijan) Tarlan Guliyev - Turan Tovuz
- (Nigeria) Otto John - Turan Tovuz
- (Azerbaijan) Rustam Akhmedzade - Zira
- (Azerbaijan) Ismayil Ibrahimli - Zira
- (Azerbaijan) Ragim Sadykhov - Zira
- (Brazil) Filipe Pachtmann - Zira
- (Brazil) Ruan Renato - Zira
- (Guinea) Salifou Soumah - Zira
- (Nigeria) Abbas Ibrahim - Zira
- (Ukraine) Vladyslav Kulach - Zira

Own goals:

- (Azerbaijan) Mirabbas Mirbabayev - for Sheky City vs Kür-Araz 19 November 2023
- (Azerbaijan) Murad Qayali - for Neftçi vs Qaradağ Lökbatan 21 December 2023
- (Netherlands) Anass Najah - for Zira vs Sabail 30 January 2024
- (Morocco) Marouane Hadhoudi - for Qarabağ vs Sabah 8 February 2024
- (Azerbaijan) Qara Qarayev - for Qarabağ vs Neftçi 24 April 2024

== See also ==
- 2023–24 Azerbaijan Premier League
- 2023–24 Azerbaijan First League
- 2023–24 Azerbaijan Second League
