= Yashar Vahabzade =

Azerbaijani footballer (born 1960)

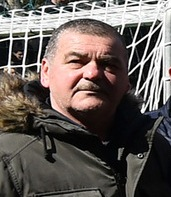

Personal information
- Full name: Yashar Fikrat oglu Vahabzade
- Date of birth: 8 April 1960 (age 66)
- Place of birth: Baku, Azerbaijan SSR
- Position: Midfielder

Team information
- Current team: Kapaz (manager)

Senior career*
Years	Team	Apps	(Gls)
1983–1989	Neftchi Baku	161	(8)
1989–1992	Khazar Sumgayit	108	(31)
1993–1997	Neftchi Baku	102	(13)
1997–1999	Baku	52	(2)
1999–2000	Khazar Sumgayit	7	(1)

International career
1993–1995	Azerbaijan	7	(0)

Managerial career
- 2001–2002: Neftchi Baku (assistant)
- 2002–2004: Azerbaijan U19
- 2006–2007: Azerbaijan U17 (coach)
- 2008: Azerbaijan U19
- 2009–2010: Azerbaijan U19 (assistant)
- 2011–2014: Azerbaijan U21 (assistant)
- 2015–2017: Azerbaijan U21
- 2019–2022: Kapaz
- * Club domestic league appearances and goals

Yashar Vahabzade (Azerbaijani: Yaşar Vahabzadə, born 8 April 1960) is an Azerbaijani football manager and former player who played as a midfielder.

== Playing career ==
Yashar Vahabzade began playing football for Soviet Second League side Avtomobilchi in 1977 and would play for the club until 1983.

He made his professional debut in the Soviet Top League in 1983 for Neftchi Baku.

Vahabzade made seven appearances for the Azerbaijan national team from 1993 to 1995.

== Managerial career ==
On 9 January 2015, he was appointed as a head coach of Azerbaijan U21 to replace Bernhard Lippert.

On 1 October 2017, vahabzade left as head coach of Azerbaijan U21.
