= Mosi =

Mosi or MOSI may refer to:

- Mosi (given name)
- Mosi (surname)
- Molybdenum silicide (MoSi_{2}), an important material in the semiconductor industry
- MOSI protocol, an extension of the basic MSI cache coherency protocol
- MOSI, Master Out Slave In (data output from master), Serial Peripheral Interface pin and logic signal
- Museum of Science and Industry (MOSI), former name of the Science and Industry Museum in Manchester, England
- Mosi (beer)

== See also ==
- Museum of Science and Industry (disambiguation), several museums
