= Abdullazade =

Abdullazade is a surname. Notable people with the surname include:

- Rufat Abdullazade (born 2001), Azerbaijani footballer
- Sabuhi Abdullazade (born 2001), Azerbaijani footballer
