= Mossi =

Mossi may refer to:

- Mossi people
- Mossi language
- Mossi Kingdoms
- the Mossi, a Burkinabe variant of the Dongola horse
- Mossi (given name)
- Mossi (surname)
- Mossi, a French fashion label founded by Mossi Traoré

== See also ==
- Mossie (disambiguation)
- Mossy (disambiguation)
- Mozzi (disambiguation)
