= Farid Nabiyev =

Azerbaijani footballer (born 1999)

Personal information
- Full name: Farid Alamdar oglu Nabiyev
- Date of birth: 22 July 1999 (age 27)
- Place of birth: Ağstafa, Azerbaijan
- Height: 1.74 m (5 ft 9 in)
- Position: Midfielder

Team information
- Current team: Kapaz
- Number: 77

Youth career
- 2010–2016: Gabala

Senior career*
Years	Team	Apps	(Gls)
2016–2017	Gabala	1	(0)
2017–2020	Slavia Prague	0	(0)
2018	→ Shevardeni-1906 (loan)	6	(2)
2020–2022	Viktoria Žižkov	60	(6)
2022–2023	Kapaz	30	(4)
2023–2024	Turan Tovuz	31	(6)
2024–2025	Sabail	28	(2)
2025–	Kapaz	32	(4)

International career^{‡}
2014–2015	Azerbaijan U17	6	(1)
2016–2017	Azerbaijan U19	6	(1)
2018	Azerbaijan U20	3	(0)
2018–2020	Azerbaijan U21	12	(0)
- * Club domestic league appearances and goals as of 22 June 2026 ‡ National team caps and goals as of 24 November 2020

Farid Alamdar oglu Nabiyev (Azerbaijani: Fərid Nəbiyev; born on 22 July 1999) is an Azerbaijani professional footballer who plays as a midfielder for Azerbaijan Premier League club Kapaz. He has represented Azerbaijan at the youth international level.

== Club career ==
On 7 March 2020, Nabiyev made his debut for Viktoria Žižkov in a 5–2 home victory against Dukla Prague.
