= Mossey =

Mossey is an English surname. Notable people with the surname include:

- Luke Mossey (born 1992), British motorcycle rider
- Neil Mossey, British comedy writer and television producer
- Ray Mossey (born 1967), American politician from Nebraska

== See also ==
- Massey (surname)
- Mosse
- Mossy (disambiguation)
