= Azerbaijan national under-20 football team =

National under-20 association football team representing Azerbaijan

Azerbaijan U20
- Nickname: Milli (The National Team)
- Confederation: UEFA (Europe)
- Head coach: Rashad Sadygov
- Captain: Hajiagha Hajili
- FIFA code: AZE
First colours	Second colours

World Cup
- Appearances: 1 (first in 2027)

The Azerbaijan national under-20 football team are a feeder team for the main Azerbaijan national football team. Founded in 2015, the team is controlled by the AFFA.

In 2027, Azerbaijan will co-host the FIFA U-20 World Cup along with Uzbekistan, marking their first time taking part in the tournament. The team also earned an automatic qualification as co-host.

== Competitive record ==
=== FIFA U-20 World Cup ===
FIFA U-20 World Cup record
Year	Result	Pld	W	D	L	GF	GA	Squad
(Tunisia) 1977	Part of Soviet Union							
(Japan) 1979	Part of Soviet Union							
(Australia) 1981	Part of Soviet Union							
(Mexico) 1983	Part of Soviet Union							
(Soviet Union) 1985	Part of Soviet Union							
(Chile) 1987	Part of Soviet Union							
(Saudi Arabia) 1989	Part of Soviet Union							
(Portugal) 1991	Part of Soviet Union							
(Australia) 1993	Did not qualify							
(Qatar) 1995	Did not qualify							
(Malaysia) 1997	Did not qualify							
(Nigeria) 1999	Did not qualify							
(Argentina) 2001	Did not qualify							
(United Arab Emirates) 2003	Did not qualify							
(Netherlands) 2005	Did not qualify							
(Canada) 2007	Did not qualify							
(Egypt) 2009	Did not qualify							
(Colombia) 2011	Did not qualify							
(Turkey) 2013	Did not qualify							
(New Zealand) 2015	Did not qualify							
(South Korea) 2017	Did not qualify							
(Poland) 2019	Did not qualify							
(Argentina) 2023	Did not qualify							
(Chile) 2025	Did not qualify							
(Azerbaijan) (Uzbekistan) 2027	Qualified as co-host							
(Armenia) (Georgia (country)) 2029	To be determined							
Total	TBD	—	—	—	—	—	—	—

== Current squad ==
The Azerbaijan under-20 national team had a training camp on May 12-28, 2018 in Baku. The list of the players invited to the training camp were:

Caps and goals as May 27, 2018 after the game against Macedonia.

No.	Pos.	Player	Date of birth (age)	Caps	Goals	Club
1	GK	Huseynali Guliyev	11 August 1999 (age 27)	0	0	(Association of Football Federations of Azerbaijan) Sabah
12	GK	Kamran Ibrahimov	7 June 1999 (age 27)	2	0	(Association of Football Federations of Azerbaijan) Neftçi
22	GK	Nijat Mehbaliyev	11 June 2000 (age 26)	1	0	(Association of Football Federations of Azerbaijan) Qarabağ
2	DF	Amin Seydiyev	15 November 1998 (age 27)	3	0	(Association of Football Federations of Azerbaijan) Gabala
3	DF	Anton Krivotsyuk	20 August 1998 (age 28)	3	0	(Association of Football Federations of Azerbaijan) Neftçi
5	DF	Ibrahim Huseynov	24 February 2000 (age 26)	0	0	(Association of Football Federations of Azerbaijan) Qarabağ
13	DF	Murad Gayali	3 September 1999 (age 27)	2	0	(Association of Football Federations of Azerbaijan) Keşla
18	DF	Rijat Garayev	7 September 1999 (age 27)	3	0	(Association of Football Federations of Azerbaijan) Neftçi
24	DF	Zahid Mardanov	9 August 2000 (age 26)	0	0	(Association of Football Federations of Azerbaijan) Sabah
25	DF	Tabriz Khubanov	15 January 1999 (age 27)	1	0	(Association of Football Federations of Azerbaijan) Keşla
26	DF	Faig Hajiyev	22 May 1999 (age 27)	3	0	(Association of Football Federations of Azerbaijan) Gabala
6	MF	Hajiagha Hajili (C)	30 January 1998 (age 28)	2	0	(Association of Football Federations of Azerbaijan) Qarabağ
7	MF	Farid Nabiyev	22 July 1999 (age 27)	3	0	(Football Association of the Czech Republic) Slavia Prague
8	MF	Rafael Maharramli	1 October 1999 (age 27)	2	0	(Association of Football Federations of Azerbaijan) Qarabağ
9	MF	Ruslan Hajiyev	26 March 1998 (age 28)	3	0	(Association of Football Federations of Azerbaijan) Qarabağ
10	MF	Ismayil Ibrahimli	13 March 1998 (age 28)	3	0	(Association of Football Federations of Azerbaijan) Qarabağ
11	MF	Suleyman Ahmadov	25 November 1999 (age 26)	1	0	(Association of Football Federations of Azerbaijan) Sumgayit
16	MF	Tural Bayramli	7 January 1998 (age 28)	1	0	(Association of Football Federations of Azerbaijan) Sumgayit
17	MF	Ozan Kökcü	18 August 1998 (age 28)	3	0	(Turkish Football Federation) Giresunspor
21	MF	Rustam Nuriyev	3 June 2000 (age 26)	2	0	(Association of Football Federations of Azerbaijan) Gabala
23	MF	Zija Azizov	18 August 1998 (age 28)	3	1	(Royal Dutch Football Association) NEC Nijmegen
27	MF	Arziman Rizvanov	25 October 1999 (age 27)	1	0	(Football Association of the Czech Republic) Banik Ostrava
28	MF	Shakir Seyidov	31 December 2000 (age 25)	2	0	(Association of Football Federations of Azerbaijan) Sabah
15	FW	Ali Sadikhov	13 August 1999 (age 27)	1	0	(Association of Football Federations of Azerbaijan) Gabala
19	FW	Famil Jamalov	8 April 1998 (age 28)	3	0	(Association of Football Federations of Azerbaijan) Qarabağ
20	FW	Kamran Aliyev	15 October 1998 (age 28)	3	1	(Russian Football Union) Khimki

=== Recent call-ups ===
The following players have also been called up to the Azerbaijan squad within the last 12 months and are still available for selection.

Pos.	Player	Date of birth (age)	Caps	Goals	Club	Latest call-up

Notes

- ^{INJ} = Not part of the current squad due to injury.
- ^{PRE} = Preliminary squad
- ^{RET} = Retired from international football.

=== FIFA U-20 World Cup ===
FIFA U-20 World Cup record
Year	Round	Position	Pld	W	D	L	GF	GA
(Tunisia) 1977	Did not qualify							
(Japan) 1979	Did not qualify							
(Australia) 1981	Did not qualify							
(Mexico) 1983	Did not qualify							
(Soviet Union) 1985	Did not qualify							
(Chile) 1987	Did not qualify							
(Saudi Arabia) 1989	Did not qualify							
(Portugal) 1991	Did not qualify							
(Australia) 1993	Did not qualify							
(Qatar) 1995	Did not qualify							
(Malaysia) 1997	Did not qualify							
(Nigeria) 1999	Did not qualify							
(Argentina) 2001	Did not qualify							
(United Arab Emirates) 2003	Did not qualify							
(Netherlands) 2005	Did not qualify							
(Canada) 2007	Did not qualify							
(Egypt) 2009	Did not qualify							
(Colombia) 2011	Did not qualify							
(Turkey) 2013	Did not qualify							
(New Zealand) 2015	Did not qualify							
(South Korea) 2017	Did not qualify							
(Poland) 2019	Did not qualify							
(Argentina) 2023	Did not qualify							
(Chile) 2025	Did not qualify							
(Azerbaijan) (Uzbekistan) 2027	Qualified as Co-host							
Total		1/24						

== Coaching staff ==
Position	Name
Head coach	(Portugal) Rui Jorge
Assistant coach	(Portugal) Romeu Almeida
Assistant coach	(Portugal) Alexandre Silva
Assistant coach	(Azerbaijan) Vaqif Cavadov
Goalkeeper Coach	(Azerbaijan) Üzeir İbrahimov
Analyst	(Portugal) Telmo Silva
Sports Scientist	(Portugal) Ezequiel Cartaxo

== See also ==
- Azerbaijan national football team
- Azerbaijan national under-23 football team
- Azerbaijan national under-21 football team
- Azerbaijan national under-19 football team
- Azerbaijan national under-18 football team
- Azerbaijan national under-17 football team
