= Mozzie =

Mozzie may refer to:

- De Havilland Mosquito, a World War II combat aircraft
- Mozzie (White Collar), a character in the comedy drama series
- A Rainbow Six Siege operator
- Australian word for a mosquito

== See also ==
- Mosquito (disambiguation)
- Mossie (disambiguation)
- Mozzi (disambiguation)
