= Bahadur Haziyev =

Azerbaijani footballer (born 1999)

Personal information
- Full name: Bahadur Mammad oglu Haziyev
- Date of birth: 26 March 1999 (age 27)
- Place of birth: Baku, Azerbaijan
- Height: 1.65 m (5 ft 5 in)
- Position: Forward

Team information
- Current team: Sabail
- Number: 8

Youth career
- Neftçi Baku

Senior career*
Years	Team	Apps	(Gls)
2018–2019	MOIK Baku		
2019–2021	Sabail	10	(1)
2021–2025	Şamaxı	44	(3)
2023–2024	→ Sabail (loan)	17	(0)
2024–2025	→ İmişli (loan)	7	(2)
2025	→ Qaradağ (loan)	15	(3)
2025–	Sabail	11	(1)

International career^{‡}
2016	Azerbaijan U17	3	(0)
2017	Azerbaijan U19	11	(4)
2018	Azerbaijan U21	1	(0)
- * Club domestic league appearances and goals as of 24 December 2025 ‡ National team caps and goals as of 19 November 2018

Bahadur Haziyev (Azerbaijani: Bahadur Həziyev, born on 26 March 1999) is an Azerbaijani footballer who plays as a forward for Azerbaijan First League club Sabail.

== Club career ==
On 16 February 2020, Haziyev made his debut in the Azerbaijan Premier League for Sabail match against Gabala.

On 15 December 2022, Şamaxı announced that Haziyev had signed a new two-and-a-half-year contract with the club.

On 7 June 2024, Sabail announced that Haziyev's loan deal from Şamaxı had ended and that he had returned to his parent club.

== Honours ==
MOIK Baku

- Azerbaijan First Division (1): 2018–19
