= Museum of Science and Industry =

Museum of Science and Industry may refer to:

== United Kingdom ==
- Museum of Science and Industry, Birmingham, England
- Science and Industry Museum, Manchester, England
- National Museum of Science and Industry, several British museums.

== United States ==
- Museum of Science and Industry (Chicago), Illinois
- Museum of Science & Industry (Tampa), Florida
- California Museum of Science and Industry, Los Angeles
- Oregon Museum of Science and Industry, Portland, Oregon.

== See also ==
- MOSI (disambiguation)
