= Mossi (surname) =

Mossi is an Italian surname that may refer to the following notable people:

- Dante Mossi, Honduran economist, international civil servant and diplomat
- Don Mossi (1929–2019), American baseball player
- Giovanni Mossi (c.1680–1742), Italian composer
- Hafsa Mossi (1964–2016), Burundian politician and journalist
- Juma Mossi (born 1973), Burundian football player
- Karla Mossi, Honduran-American mechanical engineering professor
- Luigi De Mossi (born 1960), Italian politician and lawyer
- Trésor Mossi (born 2001), Burundian footballer
