= Mosi (surname) =

Mosi is a surname. Notable people with the surname include:

- Hil Mosi (1885–1933), Albanian politician and poet
- Mihlali Mosi (born 1996), South African rugby union player
- Pirro Mosi (1927–2025), Albanian photographer

== See also ==
- Mossi (surname)
