= Mossie =

Mossie may refer to:

== People ==
- Mossie Carroll (born 1957), Irish former hurler
- Mossie Dowling (born 1946), Irish former hurler
- Maurice Enright (died 1920), Irish-American gangster
- Maurice Mossie Finn (1931-2009), Irish hurler
- Mossie Guttormsen (1916–1998), Australian cricketer
- Mossie Lyons, Irish Gaelic football half-back
- Mossie Smith, British actress
- Mossie Walsh (fl. 1980), Irish former hurler

== Other uses ==
- Nickname of the De Havilland Mosquito, a Royal Air Force Second World War aircraft
- Cape sparrow, a bird
- The Mossie, a rap group

== See also ==
- Mossy (disambiguation)
- Mossi (disambiguation)
- Mozzie (disambiguation)
