= Mozzi =

Mozzi may refer to:

== People ==
- Alessandro Mapelli-Mozzi (born 1951), British-Italian alpine skier
- Edoardo Mapelli Mozzi (born 1983), British-Italian property developer and husband of Princess Beatrice, a granddaughter of Queen Elizabeth II
- Andrea dei Mozzi (died 1296), Italian bishop
- Luigi Mozzi (1746–1813), Italian Jesuit controversialist
- Mozzi Gyorio (born 1989), Canadian soccer player

== Places ==
- Biblioteca Comunale Mozzi Borgetti, public library of Macerata, Italy
- Palazzo Mozzi, an early Renaissance palace in Florence, Italy
- Villa Mapolli-Mozzi, located in Ponte San Pietro, Italy

== See also ==
- Mosquito
- Mossi (disambiguation)
- Mozzie (disambiguation)
