= Elvin Badalov =

Azerbaijani footballer (born 1995)

Personal information
- Full name: Elvin Natig ogly Badalov
- Date of birth: 14 June 1995 (age 31)
- Place of birth: Saint Petersburg, Russia
- Height: 1.84 m (6 ft 0 in)
- Position: Centre-back

Team information
- Current team: Neftçi
- Number: 15

Youth career
- Zenit

Senior career*
Years	Team	Apps	(Gls)
2014–2017	Neftçi	43	(1)
2017–2018	FC Mauerwerk	24	(0)
2018	Sabah	0	(0)
2019–2025	Sumgayit	149	(2)
2025–	Neftçi	31	(1)

International career^{‡}
2011	Azerbaijan U17	3	(0)
2013	Azerbaijan U19	2	(0)
2015	Azerbaijan U21	2	(0)
2020–	Azerbaijan	22	(0)
- * Club domestic league appearances and goals as of 22 June 2026 ‡ National team caps and goals as of 4 October 2026

Elvin Natig ogly Badalov (Azerbaijani: Elvin Natiq oğlu Bədəlov; Russian: Эльвин Натиг оглы Бадалов; born 14 June 1995) is a professional footballer who plays as a defender for Neftçi in the Azerbaijan Premier League. Born in Russia, he plays for the Azerbaijan national team.

== Career ==
=== Club ===
On 23 February 2014, Badalov made his debut in the Azerbaijan Premier League for Neftçi Baku in a match against Sumgayit.

== Honours ==
Neftçi Baku

- Azerbaijan Cup (1): 2013–14
