= Bernhard Lippert =

German footballer and manager

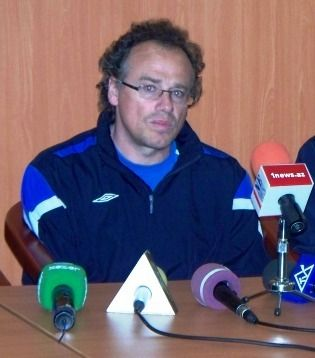

Personal information
- Date of birth: March 12, 1962 (age 64)
- Place of birth: Sailauf, West Germany
- Position: Midfielder

Senior career*
| Years | Team | Apps | (Gls) |
| 1983–1985 | SpVgg Fürth | | |
| 1985–1988 | Rot-Weiß Frankfurt | | |

Managerial career
- 1994–1997: Eintracht Frankfurt (youth manager)
- 1997–1998: Eintracht Frankfurt (assistant manager)
- 1998: Eintracht Frankfurt (caretaker)
- 1999–2000: Eintracht Frankfurt (assistant manager)
- 2000–2005: Eintracht Frankfurt U23
- 2008–2014: Azerbaijan under-21
- 2009–2012: Azerbaijan under-19
- * Club domestic league appearances and goals

Bernhard Lippert (born March 12, 1962, in Sailauf) is a German football manager and current technical director of the Ghana Football Association.

Lippert worked between 1994 and 1997 as manager of the Eintracht Frankfurt reserve team, Eintracht Frankfurt Amateure. In 1997, he was promoted as he became assistant manager of the first squad he worked there until 2000. Between December 9 and December 19, 1998, he was caretaker of the SGE. Between 2000 and November 2005 he managed the Amateure again.
