= Akpar Valiyev =

Azerbaijani footballer (born 2001)

Personal information
- Full name: Akpar Vali oglu Valiyev
- Date of birth: 7 September 2001 (age 25)
- Place of birth: Azerbaijan
- Height: 1.85 m (6 ft 1 in)
- Position: Goalkeeper

Team information
- Current team: Shamakhi
- Number: 12

Youth career
- Shamakhi

Senior career*
Years	Team	Apps	(Gls)
2022–	Shamakhi	3	(0)

International career^{‡}
2019	Azerbaijan U19	2	(0)
2022	Azerbaijan U19	4	(0)
- * Club domestic league appearances and goals as of 25 September 2022 ‡ National team caps and goals as of 25 September 2022

Akpar Valiyev (Azerbaijani: Əkpər Vəliyev; born 7 September 2001) is an Azerbaijani footballer who plays as a goalkeeper for Shamakhi in the Azerbaijan Premier League.

== Club career ==
On 21 May 2022, Valiyev made his debut in the Azerbaijan Premier League for Shamakhi in a match against Zira.
