= Mosi (given name) =

Mosi is a masculine given name. Notable people with the name include:

- Mosi Alli (born 1961), Tanzanian sprinter
- Mosi Tatupu (1955–2010), National Football League special teamer and running back from American Samoa

== See also ==
- Mossi (given name)
