= Jordan Rezabala =

Ecuadorian footballer (born 2000)

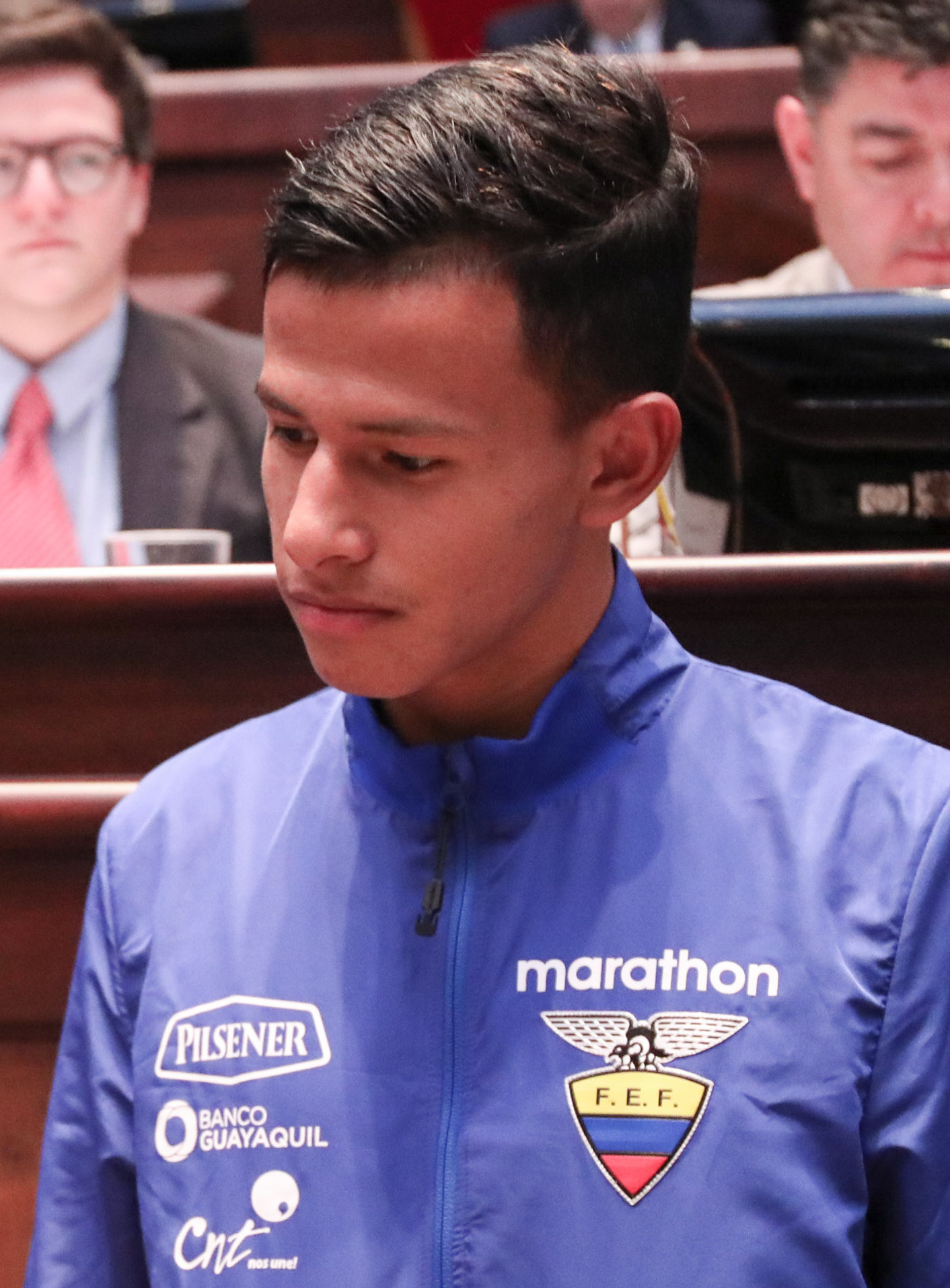

Personal information
- Full name: Jordan Lenín Rezabala Anzules
- Date of birth: 29 February 2000 (age 26)
- Place of birth: Portoviejo, Ecuador
- Height: 1.65 m (5 ft 5 in)
- Position: Midfielder

Youth career
- –2019: Independiente del Valle

Senior career*
Years	Team	Apps	(Gls)
2019	Independiente Juniors	0	(0)
2019–2022	Tijuana	7	(0)
2020	→ Dorados (loan)	0	(0)
2021	→ Olmedo (loan)	12	(1)
2021	→ Manta (loan)	10	(0)
2022	→ Guayaquil City (loan)	25	(3)
2023	Aucas	6	(1)
2023	Guayaquil City	15	(1)
2024	Sumgayit	27	(5)
2025	Dorados	6	(0)
2025-2026	Neftçi	25	(0)

International career^{‡}
2017	Ecuador U17	8	(2)
2018–2019	Ecuador U20	19	(3)
2020	Ecuador U23	3	(0)
Medal record
Men's football
Representing Ecuador
FIFA U-20 World Cup
Third place	2019 Poland
- * Club domestic league appearances and goals as of 12 August 2026 ‡ National team caps and goals as of 24 January 2020 (UTC)

Jordan Lenín Rezabala Anzules (born 29 February 2000) is an Ecuadorian professional footballer who plays as a midfielder, most recently for Neftçi.

== Career ==
On 15 July 2026, Azerbaijan Premier League club Neftçi announced the signing of Rezabala to a two-year contract.

On 19 June 2026, Neftçi announced that Rezabala had left the club.
