= Mossi (given name) =

Mossi is a masculine given name. Notable people with the name include:

- Mossi Issa Moussa (born 1993), Nigerien football player
- Mossi Moussa (born 1992), Burundian football midfielder
- Mossi Raz (born 1965), Israeli politician
- Mossi Traoré (born 1985), French fashion designer

== See also ==
- Mosi (given name)
