= Mossy =

Mossy may refer to:

== Biology ==
- A habitat or environment rich in moss

== Places ==
- Mossy, West Virginia, unincorporated community in Fayette County, West Virginia, United States

== Given names ==
- Mossy Cade (born 1961), former professional American football player
- Mossy Lawler (born 1980), rugby union player
- Mossy Murphy, retired Irish sportsperson
- Tomás Quinn, retired Irish sportsperson
- Mossy O'Riordan, Irish sportsperson who played hurling with the Cork senior inter-county team in the 1940s and 1950s
- Mossy, a fictional character in The Golden Key by George MacDonald

== See also ==
- Battle of Mossy Creek, minor battle of the American Civil War, on December 29, 1863
- Mossy fiber (cerebellum), one of the major inputs to cerebellum
- Mossy fiber (hippocampus), pathway to the CA3 region
- Mossy forest shrew (Crocidura musseri), a species of shrew native to Indonesia
- Mossy-nest swiftlet (Aerodramus salangana), a species of swift in the family Apodidae
- Mossie (disambiguation)
- Mossi (disambiguation)
