= Rövlan Muradov =

Azerbaijani footballer (born 1998)

Personal information
- Full name: Rövlan Rövşən oğlu Muradov
- Date of birth: 28 March 1998 (age 28)
- Place of birth: Azerbaijan
- Height: 1.74 m (5 ft 9 in)
- Position: Winger

Team information
- Current team: Zira
- Number: 7

Youth career
- Gabala

Senior career*
Years	Team	Apps	(Gls)
2017–2023	Gabala	100	(10)
2018	→ Slavia Prague (loan)	0	(0)
2018	→ Qarabağ (loan)	0	(0)
2023–2025	Sumgayit	60	(4)
2025–	Zira	11	(0)

International career^{‡}
2016	Azerbaijan U19	3	(1)
2019–2020	Azerbaijan U21	6	(0)
- * Club domestic league appearances and goals as of 22 June 2026 ‡ National team caps and goals as of 18 September 2020

Rövlan Rövşən oğlu Muradov (born on 28 March 1998) is an Azerbaijani professional footballer who plays as a winger for Zira in the Azerbaijan Premier League.

== Career ==
=== Club ===
On 11 May 2019, Muradov made his debut in the Azerbaijan Premier League for Gabala match against Sumgayit.

On 20 June 2023, Gabala announced that Muradov had left the club at the end of his contract. The following day, 21 June 2023, Sumgayit announced that they'd signed Muradov to a two-year contract.

== Career statistics ==
=== Club ===
As of match played 3 June 2022

Appearances and goals by club, season and competition
Club	Season	League			National Cup		Continental		Other		Total	
Club	Season	Division	Apps	Goals	Apps	Goals	Apps	Goals	Apps	Goals	Apps	Goals
Gabala	2018–19	Azerbaijan Premier League	1	0	1	0	-		-		2	0
Gabala	2019–20	Azerbaijan Premier League	18	4	2	0	1 (Note: Appearances in the UEFA Europa League)	0	-		21	4
Gabala	2020–21	Azerbaijan Premier League	21	1	2	0	-		-		23	1
Gabala	2021–22	Azerbaijan Premier League	27	3	4	1	-		-		31	4
Gabala	2022–23	Azerbaijan Premier League	33	2	5	0	2 (Note: Appearances in the UEFA Europa Conference League)	1	-		40	3
Gabala	Total		100	10	14	1	3	1	-	-	117	12
Career total			100	10	14	1	3	1	-	-	117	12

== Honours ==
Gabala

- Azerbaijan Cup (1): 2018–19
