= Easah Suliman =

Pakistani footballer

Personal information
- Full name: Easah Zaheer Suliman
- Date of birth: 26 January 1998 (age 28)
- Place of birth: Birmingham, England
- Height: 6 ft 2 in (1.88 m)
- Position: Centre-back

Team information
- Current team: Sumgayit
- Number: 4

Youth career
- 2012–2015: Aston Villa

Senior career*
Years	Team	Apps	(Gls)
2015–2020	Aston Villa	0	(0)
2016–2017	→ Cheltenham Town (loan)	9	(0)
2018	→ Grimsby Town (loan)	2	(0)
2018	→ FC Emmen (loan)	3	(0)
2020–2023	Vitória SC	18	(0)
2021–2022	→ Nacional (loan)	13	(0)
2022–2023	→ Vilafranquense (loan)	16	(0)
2023–	Sumgayit	31	(4)

International career^{‡}
2012–2014	England U16	5	(0)
2013–2015	England U17	16	(0)
2015–2016	England U18	5	(0)
2016–2017	England U19	10	(1)
2017–2018	England U20	10	(2)
2023–	Pakistan	13	(0)
Medal record
Men's football
Representing England
UEFA European Championship
UEFA European Under-19 Championship
Winner	2017
- * Club domestic league appearances and goals as of 26 May 2024 ‡ National team caps and goals as of 20:08, 2 October 2026 (UTC)

Easah Zaheer Suliman (Urdu: عیسیٰ ظہیر سلیمان; born 26 January 1998) is a professional footballer who plays as a centre-back for Azerbaijan Premier League club Sumgayit. Born in England, he plays for the Pakistan national team.

Suliman is a product of the Aston Villa Academy. Suliman has played on loan at English Football League sides Cheltenham Town and Grimsby Town as well as Eredivisie side FC Emmen. After moving to Primeira Liga club Vitória S.C. in 2020, Suliman had loan spells at Nacional and Vilafranquense until moving to Azerbaijan Premier League club Sumgayit in 2023.

Suliman represented England at youth level and is the first player of Asian heritage to captain an England football side, having done so at Under-16, Under-17 and Under-19 levels. Suliman played every game at centre back in the England Under-19s victorious UEFA European Under-19 Championship campaign in July 2017, scoring the opening goal in England's 2–1 final victory over Portugal. He is also seen as one of the best centre backs to play for Pakistan for which he made his senior international debut.

== Club career ==
=== Aston Villa ===
Easah hails from Hall Green area of Birmingham, and started in the Aston Villa academy at 8 years old.

In January 2015, after reported interest from Bundesliga champions Bayern Munich and Premier League giants Liverpool, Easah secured his future with Aston Villa, signing a two year professional contract.

Suliman was called up to train with the first-team squad by Rémi Garde during the 2015–16 season, and was named as a substitute for a match in the League Cup against Notts County on 25 August 2015. Suliman made his first team debut under manager Steve Bruce, featuring as a late substitute in a 4–1 League Cup victory over Wigan Athletic on 22 August 2017.

==== Cheltenham Town (loan) ====
On 4 August 2016, Suliman joined Cheltenham Town on loan until 2 January 2017. He made his Cheltenham debut on 6 August 2016 in a 1–1 home draw against Leyton Orient. Three days later he played the full 90 minutes in a 1–0 League Cup win against League One side Charlton Athletic.

==== Grimsby Town (loan) ====
On 31 January 2018, Suliman joined League Two side Grimsby Town until the end of the 2017–18 season. He made his league debut in a 1–1 draw with Port Vale on 10 March 2018.

==== FC Emmen (loan) ====
On 17 August 2018, Suliman joined Dutch Eredivisie side FC Emmen on a season-long loan deal. On 28 December 2018, Suliman was recalled from his loan spell at Emmen due to him playing only 9 minutes in his 4-month spell there. The Villa staff and Emmen manager came to an agreement that the loan was 'no longer useful'.

=== Vitória SC ===
On 21 January 2020, Suliman joined Portuguese side Vitória SC for an undisclosed fee. On 5 June 2020, Suliman made his debut in a 2–2 draw with Sporting CP. In doing so, he became the first player of Pakistani descent to play in the top flight in Portugal. He made his first Primeira Liga start on 30 June 2020, helping his side earn a clean sheet in a 2–0 victory over Vitória FC.

==== Nacional (loan) ====
On 28 July 2021, Suliman joined recently relegated Nacional on a season-long loan. On 15 August 2021, he made his debut for Nacional as a late substitute in a 4–0 victory over Vilafranquense. Suliman made his first start on 28 August 2021 in a 2–1 home victory against Varzim in which he played the full ninety minutes.

==== Vilafranquense (loan) ====
On 1 September 2022, Suliman joined Vilafranquense in the Portuguese second tier on a season-long loan. Suliman made his debut for the club on 8 October 2022, in a 0–1 home defeat to Penafiel.

=== Sumgayit ===
On 13 July 2023, it was reported that Azerbaijan Premier League club Sumgayit were very close to signing Suliman. On 21 July, Sumgayit confirmed the signing on a two-year contract. He made his debut on the opening game of the league on 5 August 2023, a 4–1 away victory over Sabail - playing the full 90 minutes. On 19 August 2023, Suliman scored his first senior professional goal in the 3rd minute in a 2–1 away victory against Gabala.

Suliman suffered a knee injury at the start of the 2024-25 season and missed two full seasons in Azerbaijan as a result. Sumgayit extended his contract during this spell on the sidelines.

== International career ==
Suliman has represented England at U16, U17, U18, U19 and U20 levels and was the first British Asian to captain an England side at any level in official matches. Suliman captained England Under-16s at the 2014 Montaigu Tournament with the side finishing third overall. Suliman has also captained England at under-17 level against the Faroe Islands.

Suliman was promoted to the England Under-19 side in August 2016 and played the full match in a 1–1 friendly against the Netherlands Under-19 side. A penalty shoot-out was held following the match with Suliman scoring the winning penalty. Tom Davies of Everton started the game as captain but passed the armband to Suliman after he was substituted in the 61st minute.

Suliman started every game at centre back in England Under-19's victorious 2017 UEFA European Under-19 Championship campaign in July 2017. He scored the opening goal in the final, a header following a rebound off the opposition goalkeeper, in England's 2–1 win over Portugal in Georgia's Tengiz Burjanadze Stadium.

Suliman is eligible to play for Pakistan because of his Pakistani background. On 18 May 2023, it was confirmed that Easah would represent Pakistan after FIFA approved the request from Pakistan Football Federation.

On 14 June 2023, Suliman made his debut for the Pakistan national football team in a 1–0 friendly defeat to Kenya. On 17 June, he was selected in the Pakistan squad for the 2023 SAFF Championship which is a FIFA-sanctioned competition and would therefore tie Suliman's international future to Pakistan. He captained the side on his second match against Djibouti.

After two years of injury, Suliman returned to the Pakistan squad in June 2026 and played in two friendlies against Afghanistan, both of which ended in a 2-0 win for The Falcons.

== Personal life ==
Suliman has discussed his British Pakistani heritage and being a Muslim professional footballer in interviews. His family originates from the city of Mirpur in the Azad Kashmir region of Pakistan. He has spoken of his family's friendship with England cricketer Moeen Ali and how he encouraged him to keep going to secure a professional contract.

== Career statistics ==
=== Club ===
As of matches played 26 November 2024

Appearances and goals by club, season and competition
Club	Season	League			National Cup (Note: Includes FA Cup, Taça de Portugal, Azerbaijan Cup)		League Cup (Note: Includes EFL Cup, Taça da Liga)		Europe		Other (Note: Includes EFL Trophy)		Total	
Club	Season	Division	Apps	Goals	Apps	Goals	Apps	Goals	Apps	Goals	Apps	Goals	Apps	Goals
Aston Villa	2016–17	Championship	0	0	0	0	0	0	–		–		0	0
Aston Villa	2017–18	Championship	0	0	0	0	1	0	–		–		1	0
Aston Villa	2019–20	Premier League	0	0	0	0	0	0	–		2 (Note: Appearances in the EFL Trophy)	0	2	0
Aston Villa	Total		0	0	0	0	1	0	–		2	0	3	0
Cheltenham Town (loan)	2016–17	League Two	9	0	1	0	2	0	–		0	0	12	0
Grimsby Town (loan)	2017–18	League Two	2	0	0	0	0	0	–		0	0	2	0
FC Emmen (loan)	2018–19	Eredivisie	3	0	1	0	–		–		–		4	0
Vitória de Guimarães	2019–20	Primeira Liga	6	0	0	0	0	0	–		–		6	0
Vitória de Guimarães	2020–21	Primeira Liga	12	0	0	0	0	0	–		–		12	0
Vitória de Guimarães	2021–22	Primeira Liga	0	0	0	0	0	0	–		–		0	0
Vitória de Guimarães	2022–23	Primeira Liga	0	0	0	0	0	0	–		–		0	0
Vitória de Guimarães	Total		32	0	2	0	2	0	–		–		36	0
Nacional (loan)	2021–22	Liga Portugal 2	13	0	1	0	0	0	–		–		14	0
Vilafranquense (loan)	2022–23	Liga Portugal 2	16	0	0	0	1	0	–		–		17	0
Sumgayit FK	2023–24	Azerbaijan Premier League	27	4	2	0	0	0	–		–		9	2
Career total			74	4	3	0	4	0	–		2	0	79	2

=== International ===
As of match played 2 October 2026

Appearances and goals by national team and year
National team	Year	Apps	Goals
Pakistan	2023	7	0
Pakistan	2024	2	0
Pakistan	2026	4	0
Total		13	0

== Honours ==
England U19

- UEFA European Under-19 Championship: 2017

Pakistan

- Diamond Jubilee International Football Tournament: 2026

== See also ==
- List of Pakistan national football team captains
- British Asians in association football
- List of Pakistan international footballers born outside Pakistan
