= Rafael Maharramli =

Azerbaijani footballer (born 1999)

Personal information
- Full name: Rafael Ramiz oglu Maharramli
- Date of birth: 1 October 1999 (age 27)
- Place of birth: Baku, Azerbaijan
- Height: 1.71 m (5 ft 7 1/2 in)
- Position: Midfielder

Senior career*
Years	Team	Apps	(Gls)
2017–2018	Keşla	4	(1)
2018–2021	Qarabağ	0	(0)
2018–2020	→ Zira (loan)	12	(0)
2020–2021	→ Keşla (loan)	20	(0)
2021–2022	Şamaxı	18	(0)
2022–2024	Sabail	46	(1)
2024–2026	Şamaxı	44	(0)

International career^{‡}
2017	Azerbaijan U19	2	(0)
2019	Azerbaijan U21	6	(0)
- * Club domestic league appearances and goals as of 30 May 2026 ‡ National team caps and goals as of 20 September 2020

Rafael Maharramli (Azerbaijani: Rafael Məhərrəmli, born on 1 October 1999) is an Azerbaijani footballer who plays as a midfielder for Şamaxı in the Azerbaijan Premier League.

== Club career ==
On 25 November 2017, Maharramli made his debut in the Azerbaijan Premier League for Keşla against Neftçi Baku.

He signed a contract with Qarabağ FK in summer 2018. On 20 August 2020, Keşla FK announced the signing of Maharramli on a one-year loan.

== Honours ==
Keşla

- Azerbaijan Cup: 2017–18
