= Karla Mossi =

Honduran-American mechanical engineer

Karla Mossi is a mechanical engineering professor whose research topics include the applications of pyroelectricity, piezoelectricity, and thermoelectric materials in energy harvesting, energy conversion, sensors, and actuators. Originally from Honduras, she works in the United States as associate chair, professor, and graduate program director in the Department of Mechanical & Nuclear Engineering at Virginia Commonwealth University.

== Education and career ==
Mossi is originally from Tegucigalpa. At age 16, after graduating from an all-girls high school, the Instituto Sagrado Corazón de Jesús in Tegucigalpa, Mossi became the only female mechanical engineering student at the Universidad Nacional Autónoma de Honduras. She received a bachelor's degree there in 1988, and continued her studies in the US at Old Dominion University, where she received a master's degree in 1992 and completed her Ph.D. in 1998. While a student, she also worked as director of research at a tech company.

Despite her father's wishes that she return to Honduras, she went on to work for NASA, and then joined the Virginia Commonwealth University faculty in 2001. As graduate program director in the VCU Department of Mechanical and Nuclear Engineering, she founded two new programs, a Ph.D. and an online master's degree.

She is also a leader in the Society of Hispanic Professional Engineers and in the Virginia Latino Higher Education Network.

== Recognition ==
Mossi was named as an ASME Fellow in 2026.
