= Kamran Quliyev =

Azerbaijani footballer (born 2000)

Personal information
- Full name: Kamran Rüfət oğlu Quliyev
- Date of birth: 11 March 2000 (age 26)
- Place of birth: Azerbaijan
- Height: 1.79 m (5 ft 10 in)
- Position: Forward

Team information
- Current team: Sabail
- Number: 30

Youth career
- Gabala

Senior career*
Years	Team	Apps	(Gls)
2018–2019	Jonava	4	(0)
2020–2023	Sabah	4	(0)
2022–2023	→ Shamakhi (loan)	32	(5)
2023–2025	Sumgayit	36	(4)
2025–	Sabail	12	(5)

International career^{‡}
2018–2019	Azerbaijan U19	6	(3)
2022	Azerbaijan U21	1	(0)
- * Club domestic league appearances and goals as of 24 December 2025 ‡ National team caps and goals as of 3 October 2024

Kamran Rüfət oğlu Quliyev (born 11 March 2000) is an Azerbaijani footballer who plays as a forward for Sabail in the Azerbaijan First League.

== Club career ==
On 16 December 2021, Quliyev made his debut in the Azerbaijan Premier League for Sabah match against Sabail.
