= Roi Kahat =

Israeli footballer

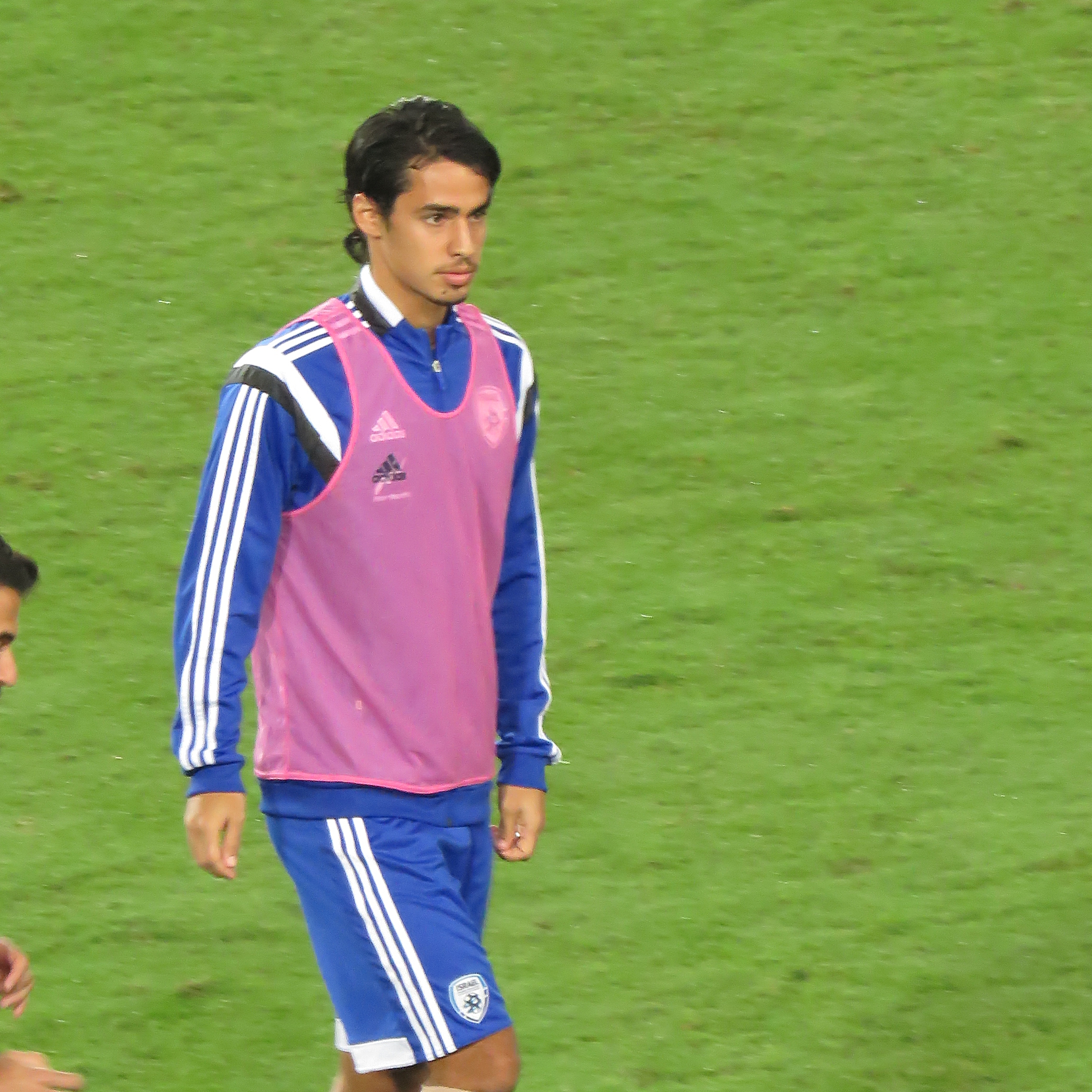
- Kahat with Israel in 2015

Personal information
- Date of birth: 12 May 1992 (age 34)
- Place of birth: Rehovot, Israel
- Height: 1.79 m (5 ft 10 in)
- Position: Attacking midfielder

Team information
- Current team: Sumgayit
- Number: 19

Youth career
- 2003–2004: Sektzia Ness Ziona
- 2004–2011: Maccabi Tel Aviv

Senior career*
Years	Team	Apps	(Gls)
2011–2013	Maccabi Tel Aviv	19	(3)
2012–2013	→ Hapoel Be'er Sheva (loan)	20	(1)
2013	Maccabi Yavne	15	(2)
2014–2015	Ironi Kiryat Shmona	54	(18)
2015–2016	Austria Wien	29	(1)
2016–2019	Maccabi Haifa	68	(6)
2019–2020	Maccabi Netanya	28	(4)
2020–2023	Ironi Kiryat Shmona	97	(14)
2023–	Sumgayit	89	(14)

International career
2011–2014	Israel U21	12	(2)
2015–2016	Israel	5	(0)
- * Club domestic league appearances and goals as of 27 June 2025

Roi Kehat (or Roei Kaat, Hebrew: רועי קהת; born 12 May 1992) is an Israeli professional footballer who plays as an attacking midfielder for Sumgayit in the Azerbaijan Premier League.

== Club career ==
=== Maccabi Tel Aviv ===
Kahat began his career in the youth system of Maccabi Tel Aviv. At 2010–11 season he won with the youth team the double and finished the top league scorer (18 goals) along with his teammate Mu'nas Dabbur. On 15 February 2011 he made his debut for the senior team at the loss 1–0 to Hapoel Haifa. On 15 September 2011, he scored his debut senior team, at the loss 5–1 to Beşiktaş at the 2011–12 UEFA Europa League competition. Three days later scored his first goal in the Israeli Premier League during a 2–0 victory against Bnei Sakhnin.

=== Hapoel Be'er Sheva & Maccabi Yavne ===
At August 2012 was loaned to Hapoel Be'er Sheva until the end of the season. On 10 November 2012, he scored his debut goal for Be'er Sheva one minute after he came as a substitute against Hapoel Acre, and the game finished at draw 2–2. In summer 2013 was released from Maccabi Tel Aviv and signed to Maccabi Yavne from Liga Leumit.

=== Hapoel Ironi Kiryat Shmona ===
After half a season in Yavne, Kahat returned to the Premier League, when he signed to Hapoel Ironi Kiryat Shmona. He made his debut at the club on 13 January 2014 against his youth team, Maccabi Tel Aviv. By the end of the season scored 6 league goals Kahat in 19 appearances, and won at the Israel State Cup. At the end of the season was elected the young player of the year.

=== Austria Wien ===
On 24 August 2015, he signed in Austria Wien from Austrian Football Bundesliga.

=== Maccabi Haifa ===
On 9 August 2016, Kahat signed for Israeli Premier League club Maccabi Haifa, After passing a medical test, he signed a three-year contract worth €250,000 per year.

== International career ==
On 19 October 2011 he made his debut for Israel U21 in a friendly match against Ukraine. In November 2014 was called up to the Israeli senior team for the UEFA Euro 2016 qualifying game against Bosnia and Herzegovina but did not play. On 12 June, against the same opponents at the Stadion Bilino Polje in Zenica, he made his debut as an 80th-minute substitute for Nir Biton in a 1–3 defeat.

== Career statistics ==
As of 7 August 2022

Appearances and goals by club, season and competition
Club	Season	League			National cup		League cup		Continental		Total	
Club	Season	Division	Apps	Goals	Apps	Goals	Apps	Goals	Apps	Goals	Apps	Goals
Maccabi Tel Aviv	2010–11	Israeli Premier League	1	0	0	0	0	0	0	0	1	0
Maccabi Tel Aviv	2011–12	Israeli Premier League	18	3	0	0	4	0	3	1	25	4
Maccabi Tel Aviv	Total		19	3	0	0	4	0	3	1	26	4
Hapoel Be'er Sheva	2012–13	Israeli Premier League	21	1	1	0	5	1	0	0	27	3
Maccabi Yavne	2013–14	Liga Leumit	15	2	0	0	0	0	0	0	15	2
Hapoel Ironi Kiryat Shmona	2013–14	Israeli Premier League	19	6	4	1	0	0	0	0	23	7
Hapoel Ironi Kiryat Shmona	2014–15	Israeli Premier League	35	14	4	0	3	0	2	1	44	15
Hapoel Ironi Kiryat Shmona	Total		54	20	8	1	3	0	2	1	67	22
Austria Wien	2015–16	Austrian Football Bundesliga	28	1	2	0	0	0	0	0	30	1
Austria Wien	2016–17	Austrian Football Bundesliga	1	0	1	2	0	0	2	0	4	2
Austria Wien	Total		29	1	3	2	0	0	2	0	34	3
Maccabi Haifa	2016–17	Israeli Premier League	32	3	1	0	2	0	0	0	35	3
Maccabi Haifa	2017–18	Israeli Premier League	28	3	4	1	6	2	0	0	38	6
Maccabi Haifa	2018–19	Israeli Premier League	8	0	1	0	1	0	0	0	10	0
Maccabi Haifa	Total		68	6	6	1	9	2	0	0	83	9
Maccabi Netanya	2019–20	Israeli Premier League	28	4	2	1	5	0	0	0	35	5
Hapoel Ironi Kiryat Shmona	2020–21	Israeli Premier League	36	6	1	0	4	1	0	0	41	7
Hapoel Ironi Kiryat Shmona	2021–22	Israeli Premier League	33	4	2	0	5	1	0	0	40	5
Hapoel Ironi Kiryat Shmona	2022–23	Israeli Premier League	0	0	0	0	1	0	0	0	1	0
Hapoel Ironi Kiryat Shmona	Total		69	10	3	0	10	2	0	0	82	12
Career total			274	46	20	3	36	5	5	3	335	57

== Honours ==
Hapoel Ironi Kiryat Shmona

- Israel State Cup - 2013–14

Individual

- The young player of the season: 2013–14
