= Erik Sorga =

Estonian footballer (born 1999)

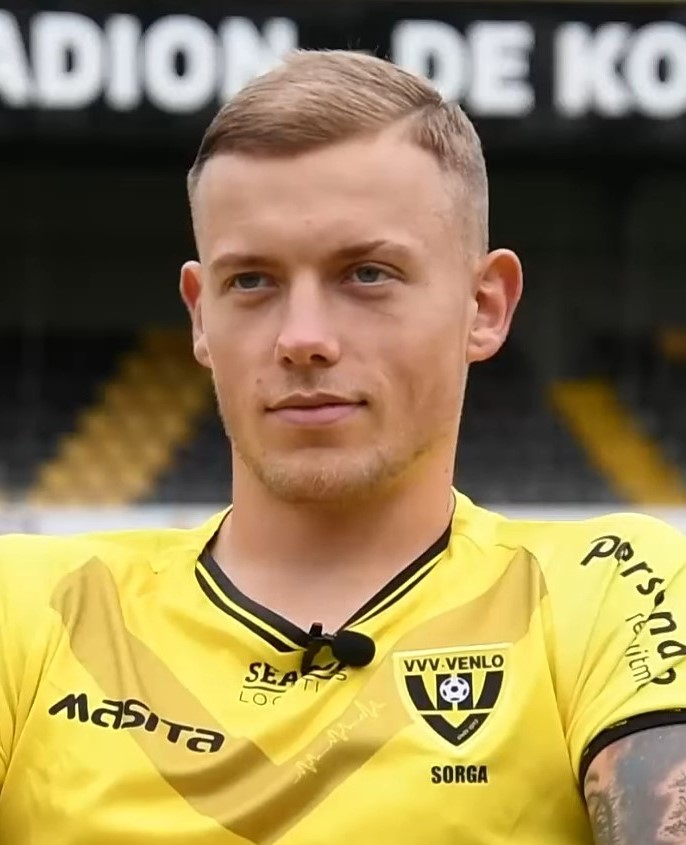
- Sorga with VVV-Venlo in 2021

Personal information
- Date of birth: 8 July 1999 (age 27)
- Place of birth: Tallinn, Estonia
- Height: 1.76 m (5 ft 9 in)
- Position: Striker

Team information
- Current team: Flora
- Number: 50

Youth career
- 2007: Štrommi
- 2008–2015: TJK Legion
- 2016: Flora U19

Senior career*
Years	Team	Apps	(Gls)
2016–2019	Flora U21	61	(48)
2016–2019	Flora	71	(41)
2020–2022	D.C. United	21	(1)
2021	→ Loudoun United (loan)	1	(0)
2021–2022	→ VVV-Venlo (loan)	11	(3)
2022	IFK Göteborg	8	(1)
2023	Lokomotiv Plovdiv	14	(2)
2023–2024	Sumgayit	27	(5)
2024–2025	Ho Chi Minh City	10	(1)
2026	HB	7	(0)
2026–	Flora	9	(5)

International career^{‡}
2014	Estonia U16	2	(0)
2014–2015	Estonia U17	11	(4)
2015	Estonia U18	1	(1)
2016–2017	Estonia U19	31	(6)
2019	Estonia U21	3	(0)
2019–2024	Estonia	31	(4)
- * Club domestic league appearances and goals as of 17 November 2026 ‡ National team caps and goals as of 30 October 2025

Erik Sorga (born 8 July 1999) is an Estonian professional footballer who plays as a striker for Meistriliiga team Flora.

== Club career ==
On 8 January 2020, Sorga signed with Loudoun United, D.C. United's reserve team. The transfer fee was reportedly $500,000. Sorga was then acquired by the first team D.C. United on 29 February 2020. He made his MLS debut on 7 March 2020, in a game against Inter Miami. He scored his first goal for the team on 2 September 2020, in a 1–0 win against the New York Red Bulls.

On 12 August 2021, Sorga joined Eerste Divisie side, VVV-Venlo, for the remainder of their season. On 8 January 2022, he joined IFK Göteborg on a permanent transfer.

After a season marred by injuries and problems with fitness, Sorga signed for Bulgarian club Lokomotiv Plovdiv on a 2-and-a-half-year contract in December 2022. He made his debut for the club on 12 February 2023, starting in a 0–0 home draw against Botev Vratsa. In July 2023, Sorga joined Azerbaijani team Sumgayit on a one-year contract, with the option of a further year.

On 3 September 2024, Sorga moved to Vietnam, signing a two-year contract with V.League 1 side Ho Chi Minh City. He spent a year away from competitive football before signing for Faroese team Havnar Bóltfelag in March 2026.

== International career ==
Sorga made his senior international debut for Estonia on 8 June 2019, replacing Rauno Sappinen in the 61st minute of a 2–1 home loss to Northern Ireland in a UEFA Euro 2020 qualifying match. He started in his second match on 6 September 2019 and scored in a 2–1 home loss to Belarus.

== Career statistics ==
=== Club ===
As of match played 25 May 2024

Appearances and goals by club, season and competition
Club	Season	League			National Cup (Note: Includes Estonian Cup, KNVB Cup, Svenska Cupen, Azerbaijan Cup and Vietnamese Cup)		Continental		Other		Total	
Club	Season	Division	Apps	Goals	Apps	Goals	Apps	Goals	Apps	Goals	Apps	Goals
Flora II	2016	Esiliiga	30	17	—		—		—		30	17
Flora II	2017	Esiliiga	21	14	—		—		—		21	14
Flora II	2018	Esiliiga	9	16	—		—		—		9	16
Flora II	2019	Esiliiga	1	1	—		—		—		1	1
Flora II	Total		61	48	0	0	0	0	—		61	48
Flora	2016	Meistriliiga	2	0	1	0	0	0	0	0	3	0
Flora	2017	Meistriliiga	8	1	4	10	0	0	0	0	12	11
Flora	2018	Meistriliiga	27	9	0	0	1 (Note: Appearance(s) in UEFA Europa League)	0	0	0	28	9
Flora	2019	Meistriliiga	34	31	1	1	4	0	0	0	39	32
Flora	Total		71	41	6	11	5	0	0	0	82	52
D.C. United	2020	MLS	17	1	—		—		—		17	1
D.C. United	2021	MLS	4	0	—		—		—		4	0
D.C. United	2022	MLS	0	0	—		—		—		0	0
D.C. United	Total		21	1	—		—		—		21	1
Loudoun United (loan)	2021	USL Championship	1	0	—		—		—		1	0
VVV-Venlo (loan)	2021–22	Eerste Divisie	11	3	0	0	—		—		11	3
IFK Göteborg	2022	Allsvenskan	8	1	2	0	—		—		10	1
Lokomotiv Plovdiv	2022–23	Bulgarian First League	14	2	—		—		—		14	2
Sumgayit	2023–24	Azerbaijan Premier League	27	5	3	2	—		—		30	7
Ho Chi Minh City	2024–25	V.League 1	0	0	0	0	—		—		0	0
Career total			214	101	11	13	5	0	0	0	230	114

=== International ===
As of match played 30 October 2024

Appearances and goals by national team and year
National team	Year	Apps	Goals
Estonia	2019	6	1
Estonia	2020	2	0
Estonia	2021	7	3
Estonia	2022	9	0
Estonia	2023	4	0
Estonia	2024	3	0
Total		31	4

Estonia score listed first, score column indicates score after each Sorga goal.

International goals by date, venue, cap, opponent, score, result and competition
No.	Date	Venue	Cap	Opponent	Score	Result	Competition
1	6 September 2019	Lilleküla Stadium, Tallinn, Estonia	2	Belarus	1–1	1–2	UEFA Euro 2020 qualification
2	2 September 2021	Lilleküla Stadium, Tallinn, Estonia	9	Belgium	2–5	2–5	2022 FIFA World Cup qualification
3	8 October 2021	Lilleküla Stadium, Tallinn, Estonia	12	Belarus	1–0	2–0	2022 FIFA World Cup qualification
4	13 November 2021	King Baudouin Stadium, Brussels, Belgium	14	Belgium	1–2	1–3	2022 FIFA World Cup qualification

== Honours ==
Flora

- Meistriliiga: 2017, 2019

Individual

- Meistriliiga Top scorer: 2019
