= Rufat Abdullazade =

Azerbaijani footballer (born 2001)

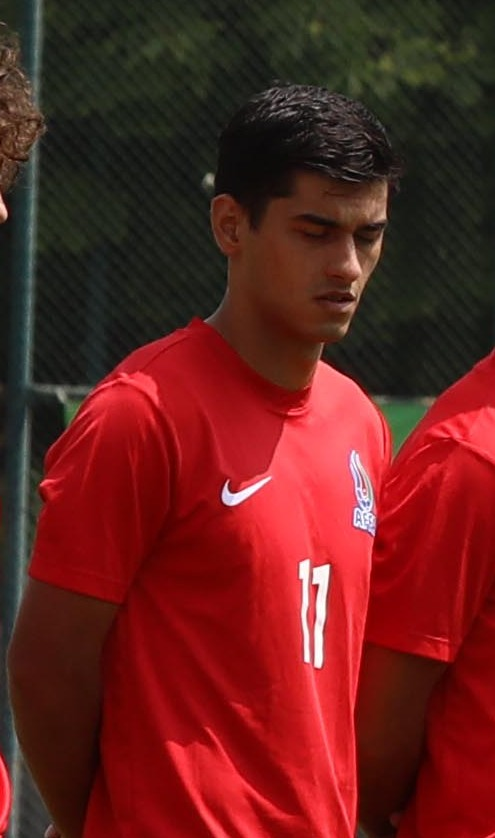
- Abdullazade in 2022

Personal information
- Full name: Rufat Shahin oglu Abdullazade
- Date of birth: 17 January 2001 (age 25)
- Place of birth: Sumgayit, Azerbaijan
- Height: 1.78 m (5 ft 10 in)
- Position: Midfielder

Team information
- Current team: Kiryat Shmona
- Number: 21

Youth career
- Sumgayit

Senior career*
Years	Team	Apps	(Gls)
2017–2023	Sumgayit	64	(1)
2023–2025	Sabail	69	(12)
2025–	Varaždin	9	(0)
2026	→ Zira (loan)	8	(0)
2026–	→ Kiryat Shmona (loan)	0	(0)

International career^{‡}
2017	Azerbaijan U17	1	(0)
2019	Azerbaijan U19	2	(1)
2020–2022	Azerbaijan U21	13	(1)
2025–	Azerbaijan	3	(0)
Medal record
Men's football
Representing Azerbaijan
Islamic Solidarity Games
Bronze medal – third place	2021 Konya
- * Club domestic league appearances and goals as of 3 July 2026 ‡ National team caps and goals as of 17:00, 15 November 2026 (UTC)

Rufat Shahin oglu Abdullazade (Azerbaijani: Rüfət Şahin oğlu Abdullazadə; born on 17 January 2001) is an Azerbaijani professional footballer who plays as a midfielder for Hapoel Ironi Kiryat Shmona loan from Varaždin and the Azerbaijan national team.

== Career ==
=== Club ===
On 4 November 2017, Abdullazade made his debut in the Azerbaijan Premier League for Sumgayit, in a match against Keşla.

On 20 July 2025, Abdullazade signed with contract Croatian side NK Varaždin.
