= Sabuhi Abdullazade =

Azerbaijani footballer (born 2001)

Personal information
- Full name: Sabuhi Mubariz oglu Abdullazade
- Date of birth: 18 December 2001 (age 24)
- Place of birth: Sumgayit, Azerbaijan
- Height: 1.75 m (5 ft 9 in)
- Position: Midfielder

Team information
- Current team: Sumgayit
- Number: 8

Youth career
- Sumgayit

Senior career*
Years	Team	Apps	(Gls)
2017–	Sumgayit	187	(8)

International career^{‡}
2017	Azerbaijan U17	2	(0)
2019–2022	Azerbaijan U21	13	(0)
2025–	Azerbaijan	7	(0)
- * Club domestic league appearances and goals as of 22 June 2026 ‡ National team caps and goals as of 18:50, 16 November 2025 (UTC)

Sabuhi Mubariz oglu Abdullazade (Azerbaijani: Səbuhi Abdullazadə; born 18 December 2001) is an Azerbaijani professional footballer who plays as a midfielder for Sumgayit in the Azerbaijan Premier League and for Azerbaijan national football team.

== Career ==
=== Club ===
On 2 December 2017, Abdullazade made his debut in the Azerbaijan Premier League for Sumgayit match against Kapaz.

=== National ===
Sabuhi Abdullazade made his debut for the national team on March 22, 2025, in a friendly match where Azerbaijan lost 0–3 to Haiti. He came in as a substitute in the 68th minute, replacing Coşqun Diniyev.
