= Kamran Əliyev =

Azerbaijani footballer (born 1998)

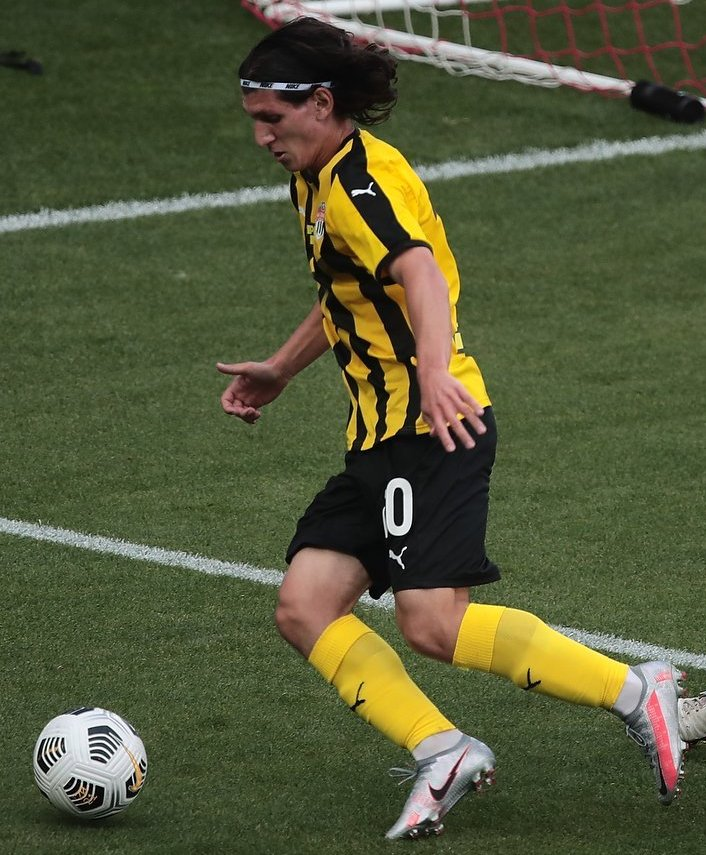

Personal information
- Full name: Kamran Qurban oğlu Əliyev
- Date of birth: 15 October 1998 (age 28)
- Place of birth: Baku, Azerbaijan
- Height: 1.78 m (5 ft 10 in)
- Position: Second striker

Team information
- Current team: SKA-Khabarovsk
- Number: 10

Senior career*
Years	Team	Apps	(Gls)
2017–2022	Khimki	80	(15)
2021–2022	→ SKA-Khabarovsk (loan)	17	(2)
2022	SKA-Khabarovsk	11	(2)
2022–2023	Arsenal Tula	14	(3)
2023–2024	Sumgayit	46	(4)
2024–	SKA-Khabarovsk	66	(7)

International career^{‡}
2018	Azerbaijan U20	2	(1)
- * Club domestic league appearances and goals as of 16 May 2026 ‡ National team caps and goals as of 24 May 2018

Kamran Qurban oğlu Əliyev (born 15 October 1998) is an Azerbaijani football second striker for SKA-Khabarovsk.

== Club career ==
He made his debut in the Russian Football National League for Khimki on 17 May 2017 in a game against Sokol Saratov. He scored his first goal for Khimki in the Russian Football National League match against Avangard Kursk in a 3–1 home victory on 4 August 2018.

He made his Russian Premier League debut for FC Khimki on 8 August 2020 in a game against PFC CSKA Moscow.

On 1 September 2021, he joined SKA-Khabarovsk on loan for the 2021–22 season. On 4 February 2022, Əliyev moved to SKA-Khabarovsk on a permanent basis.

On 10 February 2023, Sumgayit announced the signing of Əliyev.

== International career ==
Əliyev was called up and played for the Azerbaijan U20 match against Georgia on 16 May 2018. On 24 May 2018, he scored his first goal for the Azerbaijan U20, in a friendly match against Macedonia U21.
