= Trésor Mossi =

Burundian footballer

Personal information
- Full name: Trésor Ngabo Mossi
- Date of birth: 28 August 2001 (age 25)
- Place of birth: Burundi
- Height: 1.78 m (5 ft 10 in)
- Position: Midfielder

Team information
- Current team: Sumgayit
- Number: 60

Senior career*
Years	Team	Apps	(Gls)
2018–2021	Aigle Noir (Makamba)		
2021–2022	Westerlo	0	(0)
2022–2023	UN Käerjéng 97	20	(0)
2023–	Sumgayit	58	(0)

International career^{‡}
2020–	Burundi	11	(0)
- * Club domestic league appearances and goals as of 27 June 2025 ‡ National team caps and goals as of 1 April 2025

Trésor Ngabo Mossi (born 28 August 2001) is a Burundian footballer who plays as a midfielder for Sumgayit in Azerbaijan Premier League.

== Career ==
Mossi started his career with Burundian side Aigle Noir (Makamba). In 2021, he signed for Westerlo in the Belgian second division. In 2023, he joined Azerbaijan Premier League side Sumgayit FK, where he has made over 58 appearances.
