= Azerbaijan national under-19 football team =

Azerbaijan Under-19
- Nickname: Milli (The National Team)
- Association: Association of Football; Federations of Azerbaijan
- Head coach: Samir Aliyev
- Captain: Turan Valizade
- Most caps: Mahir Emreli (16)
- Top scorer: Tural Isgandarov (4)
First colours	Second colours

Biggest win
- San Marino 0–5 Azerbaijan (Tiszaújváros, Hungary; 25 October 2008)

U-19 European Championship
- Appearances: n/a (first in n/a)
- Best result: Elite qualifying stage

FIFA U-20 World Cup
- Appearances: 1 (first in 2027)
- Best result: Debut

The Azerbaijan national under-19 football team represents Azerbaijan in association football at under-19 age level. It is controlled by the Association of Football Federations of Azerbaijan, the governing body for football in Azerbaijan.

== Competition history ==
In 2014, the team under management of Nicolai Adam, managed to qualify for 2015 UEFA European Under-19 Championship in Greece.

=== UEFA European Under-19 Football Championship ===
Year	Result	GP	W	D	L	GS	GA
(Norway) 2002	Qualifying round						
(Liechtenstein) 2003	Qualifying round						
(Switzerland) 2004	Qualifying round						
(Northern Ireland) 2005	Qualifying round						
(Poland) 2006	Qualifying round						
(Austria) 2007	Elite qualifying stage						
(Czech Republic) 2008	Qualifying round						
(Ukraine) 2009	Qualifying round						
(France) 2010	Elite qualifying stage						
(Romania) 2011	Qualifying round						
(Estonia) 2012	Qualifying round						
(Lithuania) 2013	Qualifying round						
(Hungary) 2014	Qualifying round						
(Greece) 2015	Elite qualifying stage						
(Germany) 2016	Qualifying round						
(Georgia (country)) 2017	Qualifying round						
(Finland) 2018	Qualifying round						
(Armenia) 2019	Elite qualifying stage						
(Northern Ireland) ~~2020~~	Cancelled due to the COVID-19 pandemic						
(Romania) ~~2021~~	Cancelled due to the COVID-19 pandemic						
(Slovakia) 2022	Qualifying round						
(Malta) 2023	Qualifying round						
(Northern Ireland) 2024	Qualifying round						
(Romania) 2025	Qualifying round						
(Wales) 2026	Qualifying round						
(Czech Republic) 2027	TBD						
Total	0/22	0	0	0	0	0	0

== Fixtures and results ==
=== 2020 UEFA European Under-19 Championship ===
==== Group 7 ====
Pos	Team	Pld	W	D	L	GF	GA	GD	Pts	Qualification
1	Czech Republic (H)	3	2	1	0	11	1	+10	7	Elite round
2	Norway	3	2	1	0	10	2	+8	7	Elite round
3	Azerbaijan	3	1	0	2	2	5	−3	3	
4	San Marino	3	0	0	3	1	16	−15	0	

Source: UEFA
Rules for classification: Qualification tiebreakers
(H) Hosts
9 October 2019
15:00

Azerbaijan	0–1	Norway
	Report	Ibragimov 6' (o.g.)

Stadion Stovky, Frýdek-Místek
Referee: Fran Jović (Croatia)

12 October 2019
18:00

Czech Republic	4–0	Azerbaijan
Firbacher 4', 68'; Červ 10'; Zeronik 48'	Report

Stadion v Městských sadech, Opava
Referee: Alan Mario Sant (Malta)

15 October 2019
15:00

San Marino	0–2	Azerbaijan
	Report	Abdullazade 22'; Bayramov 50'

Stadion Stovky, Frýdek-Místek
Referee: Alan Mario Sant (Malta)

2016 UEFA European Under-19 Football Championship First Round qualification

10 November 2015	Ukraine	4–0	Azerbaijan	Bayil Stadium, Baku
15:00	Shevchenko 47'; Schebetun 62'; Pikhalyonok 87' (pen.); Hutsulyak 90+4'	Report		Referee: Tore Hansen (Norway)

12 November 2015	Turkey	1–0	Azerbaijan	Bayil Stadium, Baku
15:00	Balıkçı 57'	Report		Referee: Eiko Saar (Estonia)

15 November 2015	Azerbaijan	1–0	Bosnia and Herzegovina	Bayil Stadium, Baku
15:00	Mustafazade 41'	Report		Referee: Eiko Saar (Estonia)

2017 UEFA European Under-19 Football Championship First Round qualification

4 October 2016	Austria	4–1	Azerbaijan	Sūduva Stadium, Marijampolė
13:00	Jakupovic 23', 66'; Kogler 46'; Lovrić 81'	Report	Krivotsyuk 41'	Referee: Jonathan Lardot (Belgium)

6 October 2016	Bosnia and Herzegovina	2–1	Azerbaijan	Sūduva Stadium, Marijampolė
13:00	Suljić 39'; Hadžić 81'	Report	Khachaiev 68'	Referee: Jonathan Lardot (Belgium)

9 October 2016	Azerbaijan	2–0	Lithuania	Alytus Stadium, Alytus
13:00	Nabiyev 33'; Muradov 45+1'	Report		Referee: Georgios Kyzas (Greece)

2017 Valentin Granatkin Memorial Cup

9 January 2017	Lithuania	2–1	Azerbaijan	St.Petersburg SCC, Saint Petersburg
12:00	Paulikas 44'; Utkus 58'	Report	Öksüz 53'	Referee: Ranel Ziyakov

11 January 2017	Kazakhstan	2–2	Azerbaijan	St.Petersburg SCC, Saint Petersburg
12:00	Kashken 17' (pen.); Seidakhmet 53'	Report	Maharramli 45'; Nabiyev 82'	Attendance: 300; Referee: Vasilii Tikhonov

13 January 2017	Azerbaijan	0–1	Slovakia	St.Petersburg SCC, Saint Petersburg
14:15		Report	Vician 86'	Attendance: 300; Referee: Ivan Sidenkov

15 January 2017	Iran	0–1	Azerbaijan	St.Petersburg SCC, Saint Petersburg
16:30			Öksüz 77'	Attendance: 400

17 January 2017	Estonia	0–3	Azerbaijan	St.Petersburg SCC, Saint Petersburg
16:30			Mehdiyev 4'; Öksüz 42'; Aliyev 87'	Attendance: 500

20 January 2017	Belarus	1–1 (4-5 p)	Azerbaijan	St.Petersburg SCC, Saint Petersburg
16:30	Bilinkin 76'		Maharramli 90+3'	Attendance: 700

2018 UEFA European Under-19 Football Championship First Round qualification

4 October 2017	Azerbaijan	0–0	Republic of Ireland	Waterford Regional Sports Centre, Waterford
16:00		Report		Referee: Alain Durieux (Luxembourg)

7 October 2017	Serbia	4–1	Azerbaijan	Ferrycarrig Park, Crossabeg
16:00	Đ. Jovanović 36', 52'; Terzić 73'; Maksimović 83'	Report	Haziyev 90' (pen.)	Referee: Ferenc Karakó (Hungary)

10 October 2017	Cyprus	2–1	Azerbaijan	Ferrycarrig Park, Crossabeg
14:00	Louka 61' (pen.); Roles 70' (pen.)	Report	Haziyev 90+2'	Referee: Ferenc Karakó (Hungary)

2019 UEFA European Under-19 Football Championship First Round qualification

14 November 2018	Azerbaijan	1–4	Israel	Mikheil Meskhi Stadium-2, Tbilisi
11:00 (14:00 GET)	Gasimov 82'	Report	Kanaan 9'; Masarwa 28'; Arad 56', 64'	Referee: Erik Lambrechts (Belgium)

17 November 2018	Georgia	1–2	Azerbaijan	Mikheil Meskhi Stadium, Tbilisi
14:00 (17:00 GET)	Kharabadze 45+1'	Report	Bayramov 66'; Mardanov 70'	Referee: Donatas Rumšas (Lithuania)

20 November 2018	Liechtenstein	0–3	Azerbaijan	Mikheil Meskhi Stadium-2, Tbilisi
14:00 (17:00 GET)		Report	Mahmudov 14'; Guliyev 64', 69'	Referee: Erik Lambrechts (Belgium)

2019 UEFA European Under-19 Football Championship Elite Round qualification

20 March 2019	Azerbaijan	0–0	Russia	FC Krasnodar Academy Stadium pitch 5, Krasnodar
15:00 (17:00 MSK)		Report		Referee: Adrien Jaccottet (Switzerland)

23 March 2019	Republic of Ireland	3–1	Azerbaijan	Kuban Stadium, Krasnodar
10:00 (12:00 MSK)	Wright 41'; Knight 63'; Afolabi 85'	Report	Guliyev 73'	Referee: Ádám Farkas (Hungary)

26 March 2019	Romania	4–0	Azerbaijan	Kuban Stadium, Krasnodar
15:00 (17:00 MSK)	Mihăilă 7', 20'; Rus 29'; Tirlea 90+3'	Report		Referee: Adrien Jaccottet (Switzerland)

== Current squad ==
- The following players were called up for the friendly matches.
- Match dates: 2 and 4 June 2021
- Opposition: Belarus and Moldova
- Caps and goals correct as of: 27 January 2021, after the match against North Macedonia.

No.	Pos.	Player	Date of birth (age)	Caps	Goals	Club
	GK	Amin Ramazanov	20 January 2003 (age 23)	1	0	(Russian Football Union) Lokomotiv Moscow
	GK	Eldar Tagizada	30 May 2003 (age 23)	0	0	(Royal Spanish Football Federation) Barcelona B
	DF	Nihad Aghayev	27 December 2003 (age 22)	0	0	(Association of Football Federations of Azerbaijan) Sumgayit
	DF	Mirali Ahmadov	16 April 2003 (age 23)	1	0	(Association of Football Federations of Azerbaijan) Neftçi
	DF	Hüseyn Babayev	1 January 2003 (age 23)	0	0	(Association of Football Federations of Azerbaijan) Neftçi
	DF	Rashad Hasanov	11 November 2003 (age 22)	1	0	(Association of Football Federations of Azerbaijan) Keşla
	DF	Calal Hüseynov	2 January 2003 (age 23)	1	0	(Association of Football Federations of Azerbaijan) Zira
	DF	Ülvi Maadatov	6 January 2003 (age 23)	0	0	(Association of Football Federations of Azerbaijan) Gabala
	MF	Mahmud Aghayev	17 May 2004 (age 22)	0	0	(Association of Football Federations of Azerbaijan) Zira
	MF	Khayal Aliyev		0	0	(Association of Football Federations of Azerbaijan) Sabah
	MF	Gülaga Asadov	30 April 2003 (age 23)	1	0	(Association of Football Federations of Azerbaijan) Qarabağ
	MF	Zohrab Asadov	16 October 2003 (age 23)	1	0	
	MF	Vusal Ganbarov	25 April 2003 (age 23)	0	0	(Association of Football Federations of Azerbaijan) Keşla
	MF	Taleh Garayev	27 October 2003 (age 23)	0	0	(Association of Football Federations of Azerbaijan) Gabala
	MF	Yusuf Oral	5 December 2003 (age 22)	0	0	(Turkish Football Federation) Beşiktaş
	MF	Rauf Rüstamli	11 January 2003 (age 23)	1	0	(Association of Football Federations of Azerbaijan) Qarabağ
	MF	Berkay Vardar	14 January 2003 (age 23)	1	0	(Turkish Football Federation) Beşiktaş
	FW	Mehradzh Bakhshali	11 June 2003 (age 23)	1	0	(Association of Football Federations of Azerbaijan) Gabala
	FW	Mirmovsum Caniyev	11 December 2003 (age 22)	0	0	
	FW	Musa Musazada	6 August 2003 (age 23)	0	0	(Association of Football Federations of Azerbaijan) Qarabağ

== Coaching staff ==
Position	Name
Head coach	(Azerbaijan) Samir Aliyev
Assistant coach	(Azerbaijan) Emin Imamaliyev (Azerbaijan) Araz Gulamov
Goalkeeping coach	(Azerbaijan) Ramiz Karimov

== See also ==
- Azerbaijan national football team
- Azerbaijan national under-23 football team
- Azerbaijan national under-21 football team
- Azerbaijan national under-20 football team
- Azerbaijan national under-18 football team
- Azerbaijan national under-17 football team
