= Azerbaijan national under-21 football team =

National under-21 football team of the Azerbaijan

Azerbaijan U-21
- Nickname: Milli (The National Team)
- Association: Association of Football; Federations of Azerbaijan
- Confederation: UEFA (Europe)
- Head coach: Rashad Eyyubov
- Captain: Aykhan Süleymanly
- Most caps: Ağadadaş Salyanski (21)
- Top scorer: Musa Qurbanlı (6)
- FIFA code: AZE
First colours	Second colours

Biggest win
- Estonia 0–5 Azerbaijan (Pärnu, Estonia; 3 June 2022)

Biggest defeat
- Austria 7–0 Azerbaijan (Sankt Pölten, Austria; 9 October 2015); Azerbaijan 0–7 Germany (Baku, Azerbaijan; 9 November 2017); England 7–0 Azerbaijan (Bristol, United Kingdom; 15 October 2024) Note: Records for competitive matches only.

The Azerbaijan national under-21 football team is the national under-21 association football team of Azerbaijan and is controlled by the AFFA.

== Historic Results ==
Azerbaijan under-21 team has participated in European Championship qualification 16 times, and is yet to qualify for the final tournament.

Qualification Tournament	M	W	D	L	GF	GA	GD
1996	10	1	0	9	5	36	-31
2000	8	1	1	6	5	20	-15
2002	10	2	3	5	4	17	-13
2004	8	0	0	8	0	22	-22
2006	10	0	3	7	1	17	-16
2007	2	0	0	2	1	5	-4
2009	10	0	3	7	6	21	-15
2011	8	1	1	6	8	19	-11
2013	8	2	1	5	6	18	-12
2015	8	2	1	5	9	15	-6
2017	10	2	3	5	8	19	-11
2019	10	0	3	7	6	27	-21
2021	10	2	0	8	6	18	-12
2023	10	2	1	7	12	24	-12
2025	10	1	0	9	4	30	-26
2027	10	2	4	4	11	24	-13
Total	132	18	23	91	92	332	-240

== Current Results ==
=== 2027 UEFA European Under-21 Football Championship ===
==== Group F ====
Pos	Team	Pld	W	D	L	GF	GA	GD	Pts	Qualification	Portugal	Czech Republic	Scotland	Bulgaria	Azerbaijan	Gibraltar
1	Portugal	10	8	1	1	35	2	+33	25	Final tournament	—	2–0	3–0	3–0	5–0	4–0
2	Czech Republic	10	5	3	2	17	6	+11	18	Play-offs	0–0	—	2–0	1–0	5–0	5–0
3	Scotland	10	5	2	3	25	12	+13	17		0–2	0–0	—	1–0	5–2	12–0
4	Bulgaria	10	4	2	4	9	10	−1	14		2–1	2–1	0–2	—	0–0	3–0
5	Azerbaijan	10	2	4	4	11	24	−13	10		0–4	1–1	3–3	1–1	—	3–0
6	Gibraltar	10	0	0	10	1	44	−43	0		0–11	1–2	0–2	0–1	0–1	—

Source: UEFA
Rules for classification: Tiebreakers

== Players ==
The following players were called up for the 2027 European Championship qualifier game against Gibraltar on 6 October 2026.

Caps and goals correct as of October 7, after the match against Gibraltar U-21

No.	Pos.	Player	Date of birth (age)	Caps	Goals	Club
12	GK	Sadıq Məmmədzadə	13 October 2006 (age 20)	2	0	(Association of Football Federations of Azerbaijan) İmişli
1	GK	Səlim Həşimov	11 March 2006 (age 20)	6	0	(Association of Football Federations of Azerbaijan) Ganjabasar
22	GK	Xəyal Fərzullayev	25 October 2005 (age 21)	10	0	(Association of Football Federations of Azerbaijan) Sumgayit
5	DF	Emin Rüstəmov	1 May 2004 (age 22)	14	1	(Association of Football Federations of Azerbaijan) Şamaxı
4	DF	Elgün Dünyamalıyev	17 May 2004 (age 22)	4	0	(Association of Football Federations of Azerbaijan) Sabah
15	DF	Rauf Məmmədov	26 January 2006 (age 20)	13	1	(Association of Football Federations of Azerbaijan) MOIK Baku
	DF	Ceyhun Bağırzadə	14 May 2005 (age 21)	0	0	(Association of Football Federations of Azerbaijan) Şamaxı
14	DF	Əkbər Əyubov	2 February 2004 (age 22)	3	0	(Association of Football Federations of Azerbaijan) İmişli
20	DF	Ayxan Süleymanlı	28 June 2004 (age 22)	8	0	(Association of Football Federations of Azerbaijan) Sumgayit
16	DF	Həzrət Şirəliyev	20 March 2005 (age 21)	0	0	(Association of Football Federations of Azerbaijan) Şamaxı
13	DF	Sənan Muradlı	2 March 2005 (age 21)	5	0	(Association of Football Federations of Azerbaijan) Şamaxı
7	MF	Edqar Adilxanov	26 June 2005 (age 21)	8	0	(Association of Football Federations of Azerbaijan) Şamaxı
2	MF	Eşqin Əhmədov	11 January 2005 (age 21)	12	1	(Association of Football Federations of Azerbaijan) Qəbələ
21	MF	Bilal İsmayılov	22 February 2004 (age 22)	2	0	(Association of Football Federations of Azerbaijan) MOIK Baku
3	MF	Nuqay Rəşidov	2 April 2004 (age 22)	4	0	(Association of Football Federations of Azerbaijan) Qəbələ
8	MF	Emil Süleymanov	18 August 2005 (age 21)	14	0	(Association of Football Federations of Azerbaijan) Şamaxı
23	MF	Hikmət Cəbrayılzadə	10 April 2005 (age 21)	9	0	(Association of Football Federations of Azerbaijan) Qarabağ
18	MF	Şahin Şahniyarov	2 April 2004 (age 22)	12	0	(Association of Football Federations of Azerbaijan) Qəbələ
6	MF	Okan Təhməzli	18 April 2004 (age 22)	2	0	(Association of Football Federations of Azerbaijan) Şamaxı
	MF	İlyas Bağcı	20 March 2006 (age 20)	0	0	(German Football Association) Hertha BSC
10	FW	Nəriman Axundzadə	23 April 2004 (age 22)	13	2	(Turkish Football Federation) Erzurumspor
11	FW	Nahid Əliyev	28 July 2005 (age 21)	9	0	(Association of Football Federations of Azerbaijan) Shafa Baku
19	FW	Lorenzo Mezzotero	16 August 2008 (age 18)	5	1	(Italian Football Federation) Sampdoria
9	FW	Ağadadaş Salyanski	10 May 2004 (age 22)	21	4	(Association of Football Federations of Azerbaijan) Araz-Naxçıvan
18	FW	Mustafa Camara	18 September 2005 (age 21)	2	0	(Royal Belgian Football Association) Sint-Truiden
17	FW	Nihad Əhmədzadə	4 August 2006 (age 20)	14	2	(Association of Football Federations of Azerbaijan) Sumgayit

== Coaching staff ==
Position	Name
Head coach	(Azerbaijan) Rashad Eyyubov
Assistant coach	(Azerbaijan) Emin Imamaliev (Azerbaijan) Araz Gulamov
Goalkeeping coach	(Azerbaijan) Uzeyir Ibrahimov

== Manager history ==
- (Azerbaijan) Nazim Aliyev (2006)
- (Azerbaijan) Shakir Garibov (2007–2008)
- (Germany) Bernhard Lippert (2008–2014)
- (Azerbaijan) Yashar Vahabzade (2015–2017 September)
- (Azerbaijan) Samir Alakbarov (2017 September-2017 November)
- (Azerbaijan) Rashad Sadygov (2017 December-2018 December)
- (Serbia) Milan Obradovic (2019 January–2022 June)
- (Azerbaijan) Samir Aliyev (2022 July–2025 March)
- (Azerbaijan) Aykhan Abbasov (2025 March–2025 October)
- (Azerbaijan) Rashad Eyyubov (2025 October–present)

== See also ==
- Azerbaijan national football team
- Azerbaijan national under-23 football team
- Azerbaijan national under-20 football team
- Azerbaijan national under-19 football team
- Azerbaijan national under-18 football team
- Azerbaijan national under-17 football team
- Azerbaijan women's national football team
- Azerbaijan national futsal team
- Azerbaijan national beach soccer team
