= 2022–23 Zira FK season =

Zira
2022-23 season
- President: Vugar Astanov
- Manager: Rashad Sadygov
- Stadium: Zira Olympic Sport Complex Stadium
- Premier League: 5th
- Azerbaijan Cup: Quarterfinal vs Neftçi
- UEFA Europa Conference League: Second qualifying round vs Maccabi Tel Aviv
- Top goalscorer: League: Hamidou Keyta (8); All: Two Players (8)
Home colours	Away colours

The Zira FK 2022-23 season was Zira's eighth Azerbaijan Premier League season, and ninth season in their history.

== Season events ==
On 29 December, Zira announced the departure of Tamkin Khalilzade by mutual agreement.

On 25 January, Zira announced the signing of Vladyslav Kulach to an 18-month contract from Dynamo Kyiv.

On 29 January, Zira announced the signing of Wilde-Donald Guerrier to a six-month contract, with the option of an additional year, from Olympiakos Nicosia.

On 4 February, Zira announced the signing of Abbas Ibrahim to a two-and-a-half-year contract, with the option of an additional year, from Paços de Ferreira.

On 11 February, Zira announced the signing of Eldar Kuliyev to a three-and-a-half-year contract, from Mynai.

On 15 February, Ilkin Muradov joined Sabail on loan for the remainder of the season.

== Squad ==
As of match played 28 May 2023

No.	Name	Nationality	Position	Date of birth (age)	Signed from	Signed in	Contract ends	Apps.	Goals
Goalkeepers
1	Mekhti Dzhenetov	(Azerbaijan)	GK	26 January 1992 (aged 31)	Sumgayit	2021	2023	53	0
22	Nail Alishov	(Azerbaijan)	GK	30 July 2000 (aged 22)	Sabail	2022		0	0
41	Anar Nazirov	(Azerbaijan)	GK	8 September 1985 (aged 37)	Gabala	2021		23	0
Defenders
2	Sertan Tashkin	(Azerbaijan)	DF	8 October 1997 (aged 25)	Keşla	2020	2022	85	5
5	Moïse Adiléhou	(Benin)	DF	1 November 1995 (aged 27)	NAC Breda	2022		28	1
15	Ruslan Abishov	(Azerbaijan)	DF	10 October 1987 (aged 35)	Sabah	2021		4	0
18	Slavik Alkhasov	(Azerbaijan)	DF	6 February 1993 (aged 30)	Sabah	2022		25	0
26	Nemanja Anđelković	(Serbia)	DF	26 April 1997 (aged 26)	Zlatibor Čajetina	2021	2023	65	3
44	Dimitrios Chantakias	(Greece)	DF	4 January 1995 (aged 28)	Cherno More	2020		95	6
Midfielders
6	Eldar Kuliyev	(Ukraine)	MF	24 March 2002 (aged 21)	Mynai	2023	2026	14	2
9	Loris Brogno	(Belgium)	MF	18 September 1992 (aged 30)	K Beerschot VA	2021	2023	58	8
10	Ragim Sadykhov	(Azerbaijan)	MF	18 July 1996 (aged 26)	Sumgayit	2022		41	8
14	Hamidou Keyta	(France)	MF	17 December 1994 (aged 28)	Santa Clara	2022	2023	54	15
21	Hajiagha Hajili	(Azerbaijan)	MF	30 January 1998 (aged 25)	loan from Qarabağ	2020		88	0
23	Andrija Luković	(Serbia)	MF	24 October 1994 (aged 28)	Belenenses SAD	2022		30	0
28	Abbas Ibrahim	(Nigeria)	MF	2 January 1998 (aged 25)	Paços de Ferreira	2023	2025 (+1)	8	0
32	Qismət Alıyev	(Azerbaijan)	MF	24 October 1996 (aged 26)	Gabala	2020	2022	96	4
38	Ramiz Muradov	(Azerbaijan)	MF	6 July 2005 (aged 17)	Trainee	2022		1	0
56	Samir Aghayev	(Azerbaijan)	MF	25 May 2002 (aged 21)	Trainee	2021		2	0
66	Parviz Azadov	(Azerbaijan)	MF	19 October 2000 (aged 22)	Shamakhi	2023		1	0
77	Mirsahib Abbasov	(Azerbaijan)	MF	19 January 1993 (aged 30)	Sabail	2022		29	3
91	Coşqun Diniyev	(Azerbaijan)	MF	13 September 1995 (aged 27)	Sabah	2021	2023	65	4
96	Wilde-Donald Guerrier	(Haiti)	MF	31 March 1989 (aged 34)	Olympiakos Nicosia	2023	2023	10	0
Forwards
7	Filipe Pachtmann	(Brazil)	FW	11 April 2000 (aged 23)	Lviv	2022		16	1
11	Rustam Akhmedzade	(Azerbaijan)	FW	25 December 2000 (aged 22)	on loan from Qarabağ	2022		35	3
17	Toni Gomes	(Guinea-Bissau)	FW	16 November 1998 (aged 24)	Tuzlaspor	2022		25	3
19	Vladyslav Kulach	(Ukraine)	FW	7 May 1993 (aged 30)	Dynamo Kyiv	2023	2024	8	3
47	Mo Hamdaoui	(Netherlands)	FW	10 June 1993 (aged 29)	De Graafschap	2021	2023	66	5
70	Issa Djibrilla	(Niger)	FW	1 January 1996 (aged 27)	Ankara Keçiörengücü	2023		9	0
Out on loan
4	Celal Hüseynov	(Azerbaijan)	DF	2 January 2003 (aged 20)	Trainee	2020		41	1
8	Ilkin Muradov	(Azerbaijan)	MF	5 March 1996 (aged 27)	Academy	2019		138	4
	Samir Gurbanov	(Azerbaijan)	FW	24 November 2000 (aged 22)	Kapaz	2021	2025	0	0
Left during the season
13	Ramin Ahmedov	(Azerbaijan)	MF	1 June 2001 (aged 21)	Zagatala	2021	2025	21	1
19	Tamkin Khalilzade	(Azerbaijan)	DF	6 August 1993 (aged 29)	Sabah	2021		119	8

== Transfers ==
=== In ===
Date	Position	Nationality	Name	From	Fee	Ref.
12 June 2022	DF	(Azerbaijan)	Slavik Alkhasov	Sabah	Undisclosed	
12 June 2022	MF	(Azerbaijan)	Mirsahib Abbasov	Sabail	Undisclosed	
17 June 2022	MF	(Azerbaijan)	Rahim Sadikhov	Sumgayit	Undisclosed	
1 July 2022	FW	(Brazil)	Filipe Pachtmann	Lviv	Undisclosed	
4 August 2022	DF	(Benin)	Moïse Adiléhou	NAC Breda	Undisclosed	
16 August 2022	MF	(Serbia)	Andrija Luković	Belenenses SAD	Undisclosed	
16 August 2022	FW	(Portugal)	Toni Gomes	Menemenspor	Undisclosed	
6 December 2022	DF	(Azerbaijan)	Parviz Azadov	Shamakhi	Undisclosed	
1 January 2023	FW	(Niger)	Issa Djibrilla	Unattached	Free	
25 January 2023	FW	(Ukraine)	Vladyslav Kulach	Dynamo Kyiv	Undisclosed	
29 January 2023	MF	(Haiti)	Wilde-Donald Guerrier	Olympiakos Nicosia	Undisclosed	
4 February 2023	MF	(Nigeria)	Abbas Ibrahim	Paços de Ferreira	Undisclosed	
11 February 2023	MF	(Ukraine)	Eldar Kuliyev	Mynai	Undisclosed	

=== Loans in ===
Date from	Position	Nationality	Name	From	Date to	Ref.
18 July 2022	FW	(Azerbaijan)	Rustam Akhmedzade	Qarabağ	30 June 2023	

=== Out ===
Date	Position	Nationality	Name	To	Fee	Ref.
7 February 2023	MF	(Azerbaijan)	Ramin Ahmedov	Shamakhi	Undisclosed	

=== Loans out ===
Date from	Position	Nationality	Name	To	Date to	Ref.
24 August 2022	DF	(Azerbaijan)	Cəlal Hüseynov	Shamakhi	30 June 2023	
15 February 2022	MF	(Azerbaijan)	Ilkin Muradov	Sabail	30 June 2023	

=== Released ===
Date	Position	Nationality	Name	Joined	Date	Ref
4 July 2022	MF	(Nigeria)	Ahmed Isaiah	Kapaz	16 August 2022	
29 December 2022	DF	(Azerbaijan)	Tamkin Khalilzade			

== Friendlies ==
10 January 2023	Zira (Azerbaijan)	3 – 2	(Romania) Chindia Târgoviște	Antalya, Turkey
15:00 AZT (UTC+4)	Diniyev 15'; Gomes 18'; Keyta 70'	Report	Neguț 11', 32'

17 January 2023	Zira (Azerbaijan)	1 – 3	(Hungary) Szeged-Csanád	Antalya, Turkey
13:00 AZT (UTC+4)	Gomes 34'	Report	Simon 13'; Kundrák 37' (pen.); Jammeh 59'

17 January 2023	Zira (Azerbaijan)	0 – 0	(Serbia) Radnički Niš	Antalya, Turkey
16:30 AZT (UTC+4)		Report

== Competitions ==
=== Overview ===
Competition	First match	Last match	Starting round	Final position	Record							
Competition	First match	Last match	Starting round	Final position	Pld	W	D	L	GF	GA	GD	Win %
Premier League	8 August 2022	28 May 2023	Matchday 1	5th	36	13	11	12	45	46	−1	36.11
Azerbaijan Cup	23 November 2022	20 December 2022	First Round	Quarterfinal	3	2	0	1	4	3	+1	66.67
UEFA Europa Conference League	21 July 2022	28 July 2022	Second qualifying round	Second qualifying round	2	0	0	2	0	3	−3	0.00
Total					41	15	11	15	49	52	−3	36.59

Last updated: 28 May 2023
Source: Competitions

=== Premier League ===
==== Results summary ====
Overall								Home						Away					
Pld	W	D	L	GF	GA	GD	Pts	W	D	L	GF	GA	GD	W	D	L	GF	GA	GD
36	13	11	12	45	46	−1	50	6	6	6	23	31	−8	7	5	6	22	15	+7

Last updated: 28 May 2023.
Source: See Results

==== Results by round ====
Round	1	2	3	4	5	6	7	8	9	10	11	12	13	14	15	16	17	18	19	20	21	22	23	24	25	26	27	28	29	30	31	32	33	34	35	36
Ground	A	H	H	A	H	A	H	A	H	A	A	H	A	H	A	H	A	H	H	A	H	A	H	A	H	A	H	H	A	H	A	H	A	H	A	A
Result	W	L	D	L	W	W	L	W	W	L	W	L	L	W	D	W	D	D	W	L	D	L	L	W	D	D	L	D	L	W	D	L	W	D	D	W
Position	4	5	5	7	6	5	6	5	4	4	4	4	5	4	4	4	4	4	4	4	4	4	4	4	4	4	4	4	5	5	5	5	5	5	5	5

Updated to match(es) played on 28 May 2023. Source: See Results
A = Away; H = Home; W = Win; D = Draw; L = Loss

==== Results ====
5 August 2022 1	Kapaz	1 – 2	Zira	Baku
19:30 AZT (UTC+4)	Kantaria (yellow card) 19'; Ergemlidze 45'; Khvalko (yellow card) 90+1'; Aliyev (yellow card) 90+7'	Report	Hamdaoui 32'; Anđelković (yellow card) 43'; Chantakias (red card) 83'; Taşqın 90+4'	Stadium: Dalga Arena; Referee: Aliyar Agayev

12 August 2022 2	Zira	1 – 3	Sabah	Zirə
19:00 AZT (UTC+4)	Khalilzade (yellow card) 17'; Taşqın 34'; Adiléhou (yellow card) 80'	Report	Ba 5'; Mickels 27' (yellow card) 70'; Ələsgərov 48' (yellow card) 49'; Nuriyev (yellow card) 73'; Isayev (yellow card) 75'	Stadium: Zira Olympic Sport Complex Stadium; Referee: Ingilab Mammadov

21 August 2022 3	Zira	0 – 0	Sumgayit	Zirə
20:30 AZT (UTC+4)	Akhmedzade (yellow card) 75'	Report	Mustafayev (yellow card) 75'	Stadium: Zira Olympic Sport Complex Stadium; Referee: Ravan Hamzazada

26 August 2022 4	Neftçi	2 – 1	Zira	Baku
20:30 AZT (UTC+4)	Donyoh 14'; Mammadov (yellow card) 57'; Aliyev 79'; Stanković (yellow card) 88'; Arveladze (yellow card) 90+3'	Report	Keyta 56' (pen.) (yellow card) 86'; Hajili (yellow card) 81'	Stadium: Bakcell Arena; Referee: Elcin Masiyev

4 September 2022 5	Zira	2 – 1	Gabala	Zirə
20:30 AZT (UTC+4)	Sadykhov 45', 74'; Nazirov (yellow card) 90+6'	Report	Mammadov (yellow card) 31'; Alimi 35' (pen.); Hani (yellow card) 40'	Stadium: Zira Olympic Sport Complex Stadium; Referee: Rauf Jabbarov

10 September 2022 6	Sabail	1 – 2	Zira	Baku
20:30 AZT (UTC+4)	Ramazanov 13'; Zakpa (yellow card) 38'; Bayramli (yellow card) 65' (yellow-red card) 72'; Stasyuk (yellow card) 78'; Mazurek (yellow card) 80'	Report	Chantakias 5'; Taşqın 33'; Nazirov (yellow card) 87'; Ahmedov (yellow card) 90+5'; Alkhasov (yellow card) 90+6'	Stadium: Bayil Arena; Referee: Rauf Allahverdiyev

18 September 2022 7	Zira	1 – 7	Qarabağ	Zirə
20:30 AZT (UTC+4)	Hajili (yellow card) 31'; Diniyev 34'; Luković (yellow card) 45+2'	Report	Bayramov 44'; Qurbanlı 56', 60', 79', 84'; Kady (yellow card) 60' (goal) 64'; Sheydayev 68'	Stadium: Zira Olympic Sport Complex Stadium; Referee: Raad Ahmadov

1 October 2022 8	Turan Tovuz	1 – 3	Zira	Tovuz
15:30 AZT (UTC+4)	Oduwa 27'	Report	Taşqın (yellow card) 16'; Diniyev 33'; Keyta 40', 48'	Stadium: City Stadium; Referee: Rauf Allahverdiyev

7 October 2022 9	Zira	1 – 0	Shamakhi	Zirə
17:30 AZT (UTC+4)	Anđelković (yellow card) 9'; Chantakias 72'; Gomes (yellow card) 76'; Nazirov (yellow card) 90+5'	Report	Hüseynli (yellow card) 53'	Stadium: Zira Olympic Sport Complex Stadium; Referee: Ingilab Mammadov

15 October 2022 10	Sabah	1 – 0	Zira	Masazır
17:30 AZT (UTC+4)	Isayev (yellow card) 65'; Apeh 72'	Report	Diniyev (yellow card) 42' (yellow-red card) 84'	Stadium: Bank Respublika Arena; Referee: Elcin Masiyev

22 October 2022 11	Sumgayit	0 – 2	Zira	Sumgait
18:30 AZT (UTC+4)	Pereira (yellow card) 15'; Toure (yellow card) 90+4'	Report	Sadykhov 16' (pen.); Hajili (yellow card) 33'; Taşqın 71'	Stadium: Kapital Bank Arena; Referee: Farid Haciyev

29 October 2022 12	Zira	0 – 3	Neftçi	Zirə
17:30 AZT (UTC+4)	Khalilzade (yellow card) 58'	Report	Bogomolsky 6' (yellow card) 46'; Donyoh 75'; Mahmudov 83'	Stadium: Zira Olympic Sport Complex Stadium; Referee: Aliyar Agayev

5 November 2022 13	Gabala	1 – 0	Zira	Qabala
15:00 AZT (UTC+4)	Felipe (yellow card) 4'; Safarov (yellow card) 14'; Abu Akel (yellow card) 86'; Isgandarov 90+3'; Mursalov (yellow card) 90+4'	Report	Khalilzade (yellow card) 34'; Pachtmann (yellow card) 88'	Stadium: City Stadium; Referee: Rauf Jabbarov

12 November 2022 14	Zira	1 – 0	Sabail	Zirə
16:00 AZT (UTC+4)	Brogno (yellow card) 61'; Khalilzade (yellow card) 68'; Sadykhov 73'	Report	Martinov (yellow card) 68'	Stadium: Zira Olympic Sport Complex Stadium; Referee: Vugar Hasanli

28 November 2022 15	Qarabağ	0 – 0	Zira	Baku
19:00 AZT (UTC+4)	Medvedev (yellow card) 58'; Kwabena (yellow card) 90+1'	Report	Chantakias (yellow card) 90+1'	Stadium: Azersun Arena; Referee: Rauf Allahverdiyev

4 December 2022 16	Zira	2 – 1	Turan Tovuz	Zirə
17:00 AZT (UTC+4)	Luković (yellow card) 12'; Filipe 74'; Bayramov 84' (o.g.)	Report	S.Guliyev (yellow card) 19'; Bagirov (yellow card) 30'; Guseynov 86'	Stadium: Zira Olympic Sport Complex Stadium; Referee: Ingilab Mammadov

13 December 2022 17	Shamakhi	0 – 0	Zira	Shamakhi
14:00 AZT (UTC+4)	Naghiyev (yellow card) 17'	Report	Keyta (yellow card) 17'	Stadium: City Stadium; Referee: Elcin Masiyev

25 December 2022 18	Zira	2 – 2	Kapaz	Zirə
15:00 AZT (UTC+4)	Sadykhov 11'; Diniyev (red card) 18'; Anđelković (red card) 22'; Alıyev (yellow card) 22'; Taşqın 90+5' (yellow card) 90+6'	Report	F.Nabiyev 25'; Shuaibu (yellow card) 35'; Kvirkvia 42' (yellow card) 90+10'; Khvalko (yellow card) 48'; Alijanov (red card) 58'; Kantaria (yellow card) 76' (yellow-red card) 90+2'; Akhundov (yellow card) 86'; Y.Nabiyev (yellow card) 86'; Maharramli (yellow card) 89'; Ergemlidze (yellow card) 90+1' (yellow-red card) 90+10'	Stadium: Zira Olympic Sport Complex Stadium; Referee: Nicat İsmayıllı

25 January 2023 19	Zira	3 – 1	Sumgayit	Zirə
16:30 AZT (UTC+4)	Hajili (yellow card) 15'; Chantakias 50'; Brogno 73'; Gomes 79'	Report	Isgandarli 4'; Todoroski (yellow card) 20'; Abdullazade (yellow card) 57'	Stadium: Zira Olympic Sport Complex Stadium; Referee: Kamranbay Rahimov

1 February 2023 20	Neftçi	1 – 0	Zira	Baku
17:30 AZT (UTC+4)	Saldanha (yellow card) 28'; Stanković 52'; Saief (yellow card) 88'	Report	Guerrier (yellow card) 62' (yellow-red card) 75'; Chantakias (yellow card) 71'; Hajili (yellow card) 90+5'	Stadium: Bakcell Arena; Referee: Raad Ahmadov

5 February 2023 21	Zira	2 – 2	Gabala	Zirə
16:00 AZT (UTC+4)	Hajili (yellow card) 10'; Chantakias 15' (yellow card) 33'; Brogno 57'	Report	Utzig 3'; Abbasov (yellow card) 21'; Abu Akel (yellow card) 33'; Safarov (yellow card) 46'; Felipe 78'; Hani (yellow card) 90+4'	Stadium: Zira Olympic Sport Complex Stadium; Referee: Kamal Umudlu

12 February 2023 22	Sabail	2 – 0	Zira	Baku
15:00 AZT (UTC+4)	Zakpa (yellow card) 20'; Tagiyev (yellow card) 35'; Gomis 48'; Abdullayev (yellow card) 64'; Abbasov 78'	Report	Hamdaoui (yellow card) 66'; Alıyev (yellow card) 90+4'	Stadium: Bayil Arena; Referee: Rauf Jabarov

19 February 2023 23	Zira	0 – 1	Qarabağ	Zirə
19:00 AZT (UTC+4)	Guerrier (yellow card) 54'; Luković (yellow card) 74'	Report	Medvedev (yellow card) 48'; Aliyev 88' (o.g.); Medina (yellow card) 90+2'; Zoubir (yellow card) 90+6'	Stadium: Zira Olympic Sport Complex Stadium; Referee: Tural Qurbanov

24 February 2023 24	Turan Tovuz	0 – 2	Zira	Tovuz
14:00 AZT (UTC+4)	Oduwa (yellow card) 87'; Aliyev (yellow card) 90+5'	Report	Hajili (yellow card) 17'; Adiléhou 27'; Keyta 29'; Kuliyev (yellow card) 67'; Dzhenetov (yellow card) 81'; Abishov (yellow card) 90+3'	Stadium: City Stadium; Referee: Rauf Allahverdiyev

3 March 2023 25	Zira	2 – 2	Shamakhi	Zirə
17:00 AZT (UTC+4)	Keyta 29' (yellow card) 62'; Chantakias (yellow card) 56'; N.Guliyev 79' (o.g.)	Report	Samadov (yellow card) 15'; Yunanov 60' (pen.); K.Guliyev 73'	Stadium: Zira Olympic Sport Complex Stadium; Referee: Ingilab Mammadov

10 March 2023 26	Kapaz	1 – 1	Zira	Ganja
15:00 AZT (UTC+4)	F.Nabiyev 38'; Isaiah (yellow card) 62'; Kantaria (yellow card) 84'	Report	Hamdaoui (yellow card) 59'; Ibrahim (yellow card) 73'; Keyta 82' (pen.); Alıyev (yellow card) 84'; Chantakias (yellow card) 88'	Stadium: City Stadium; Referee: Kamranbay Rahimov

15 March 2023 27	Zira	0 – 2	Sabah	Zirə
20:30 AZT (UTC+4)		Report	Seydiyev (yellow card) 7'; Volkovi 52'; Mickels 62'; Camalov (yellow card) 70'; Nuriyev (yellow card) 89'	Stadium: Zira Olympic Sport Complex Stadium; Referee: Farid Haciyev

1 April 2023 28	Zira	1 – 1	Neftçi	Zirə
19:30 AZT (UTC+4)	Saief 70' (o.g.); Akhmedzade (yellow card) 73'	Report	Lebon 12'	Stadium: Zira Olympic Sport Complex Stadium; Referee: Nicat İsmayıllı

7 April 2023 29	Gabala	2 – 1	Zira	Qabala
17:00 AZT (UTC+4)	Ramon 58'; Qirtimov (yellow card) 67'; Ruan 80' (yellow card) 80'	Report	Luković (yellow card) 39'; Taşqın (yellow card) 65'; Kuliyev 69'	Stadium: City Stadium; Referee: Tural Qurbanov

14 April 2023 30	Zira	3 – 1	Sabail	Zirə
17:30 AZT (UTC+4)	Kulach 52'; Akhmedzade 69'; Kuliyev 90'	Report	Zakpa 90+5'	Stadium: Zira Olympic Sport Complex Stadium; Referee: Javid Jaliliov

21 April 2023 31	Qarabağ	2 – 2	Zira	Baku
20:00 AZT (UTC+4)	Medina (yellow card) 40'; Cafarguliyev (yellow card) 41'; Janković 54'; Sheydayev 59'; Qurbanlı (yellow card) 64'; Vešović (yellow card) 87'	Report	Adiléhou (yellow card) 23'; Keyta 62'; Kulach 65'; Alıyev (yellow card) 90'; Taşqın (yellow card) 90+2'	Stadium: Azersun Arena; Referee: Kamranbay Rahimov

1 May 2023 32	Zira	1 – 3	Turan Tovuz	Zirə
20:00 AZT (UTC+4)	Kulach (yellow card) 71'; Brogno 86'; Sadykhov (yellow card) 90+4'	Report	Aliyev 3'; F.Hajiyev (yellow card) 14'; Miller (yellow card) 43' (goal) 60'; Oduwa 58'; Marakvelidze (yellow card) 64'; Marandici (yellow card) 75'; Pusi (yellow card) 88'	Stadium: Zira Olympic Sport Complex Stadium; Referee: Rauf Jabarov

6 May 2023 33	Shamakhi	0 – 3	Zira	Shamakhi
16:30 AZT (UTC+4)	Dashdamirov (yellow card) 61'	Report	Kulach 35'; Taşqın (yellow card) 49'; Keyta 57'; Adiléhou (yellow card) 63'; Akhmedzade 82'	Stadium: City Stadium; Referee: Javid Jalilov

12 May 2023 34	Zira	1 – 1	Kapaz	Zirə
19:00 AZT (UTC+4)	Gomes 51'	Report	Khvalko 45+3'; Isaiah (yellow card) 55'	Stadium: Zira Olympic Sport Complex Stadium; Referee: Farid Haciyev

22 May 2023 35	Sabah	0 – 0	Zira	Masazır
16:30 AZT (UTC+4)	Ceballos (yellow card) 37'; Ələsgərov (yellow card) 77'; Nuriyev (yellow card) 81'	Report	Djibrilla (yellow card) 55'; Keyta (yellow card) 87'	Stadium: Bank Respublika Arena; Referee: Ingilab Mammadov

28 May 2023 36	Sumgayit	0 – 3	Zira	Sumgait
17:30 AZT (UTC+4)	Murata (yellow card) 7'; Süleymanly (yellow card) 89'	Report	Sadykhov 10', 67'; Ibrahim (yellow card) 32'; Alıyev (yellow card) 89'; Gomes 90' (yellow card) 90'	Stadium: Kapital Bank Arena; Referee: Tural Qurbanov

==== League table ====
Pos	Team	Pld	W	D	L	GF	GA	GD	Pts	Qualification
3	Neftçi	36	20	8	8	63	38	+25	68	Qualification to Europa Conference League second qualifying round
4	Gabala	36	13	11	12	47	47	0	50	Qualification to Europa Conference League second qualifying round
5	Zira	36	13	11	12	45	46	−1	50	
6	Turan Tovuz	36	10	9	17	36	49	−13	39	
7	Sumgayit	36	8	7	21	26	70	−44	31	

Source: Soccerway
Rules for classification: 1) Points; 2) Head-to-head points; 3) Head-to-head goal difference; 4) Head-to-head goals scored; 5) Head-to-head away goals scored (only if two teams); 6) Goal difference; 7) Goals scored.

=== Azerbaijan Cup ===
23 November 2022 First Round	Energetik	0 – 2	Zira	Mingachevir
14:00 AZT (UTC+4)		Report	Chantakias 30'; Akhmedzade 60'	Stadium: Yashar Mammadzade Stadium; Referee: Emin Aliyev

8 December 2022 Quarterfinal 1st leg	Zira	1 – 0	Neftçi	Zirə
18:00 AZT (UTC+4)	Hajili (yellow card) 46'; Muradov (yellow card) 49'; Sadykhov 54'; Alıyev (yellow card) 83'	Report	Jaber (yellow card) 75'	Stadium: Zira Olympic Sport Complex Stadium; Referee: Ravan Hamzazade

20 December 2022 Quarterfinal 2nd leg	Neftçi	3 – 1 (a.e.t.) (3 – 2 agg.)	Zira	Baku
19:00 AZT (UTC+4)	Bogomolsky 3'; Mahmudov 45+1'; Eddy (yellow card) 54'; Arveladze (yellow card) 60'; Saief 95'; Pato (yellow card) 101'; Brkić (yellow card) 105+2'; Asgarov (yellow card) 115'; Jafarov (yellow card) 116'	Report	Alkhasov (yellow card) 27'; Khalilzade (yellow card) 72' (yellow-red card) 120+1'; Brogno 89'; Keyta (penalty missed) 110'; Hajili (yellow card) 120+1' (yellow-red card) 120+2'	Stadium: Bakcell Arena; Referee: Javid Jəlilov

=== UEFA Europa Conference League ===
==== Qualifying phase ====
21 July 2022 Second qualifying round 1st leg	Zira (Azerbaijan)	0 – 3	(Israel) Maccabi Tel Aviv	Baku, Azerbaijan
20:00 AZT (UTC+4)	Muradov (yellow card) 17'; Hajili (yellow card) 61'; Filipe (yellow card) 83'	Report	Kanichowsky 18'; Jovanović 22', 54' (yellow card) 24'; Geraldes (yellow card) 81'	Stadium: Dalga Arena; Attendance: 4,400; Referee: Rob Hennessy (Ireland)
Note: Zira played their home match at the Dalga Arena, instead of their regular stadium, the Zira Olympic Sport Complex Stadium, which did not meet UEFA requirements.

28 July 2022 Second qualifying round 2nd leg	Maccabi Tel Aviv (Israel)	0 – 0 (3 – 0 agg.)	(Azerbaijan) Zira	Tel Aviv, Israel
21:30 AZT (UTC+4)		Report		Stadium: Bloomfield Stadium; Attendance: 11,703; Referee: Mario Zebec (Croatia)

== Squad statistics ==
As of match played 28 May 2023

=== Appearances and goals ===
No.	Pos	Nat	Player	Total		Premier League		Azerbaijan Cup		UEFA Europa Conference League	
No.	Pos	Nat	Player	Apps	Goals	Apps	Goals	Apps	Goals	Apps	Goals
1	GK	(Azerbaijan) AZE	Mekhti Dzhenetov	26	0	23	0	1	0	2	0
2	DF	(Azerbaijan) AZE	Sertan Taşqın	34	5	12+17	5	3	0	1+1	0
5	DF	(Benin) BEN	Moïse Adiléhou	28	1	22+3	1	2+1	0	0	0
6	MF	(Ukraine) UKR	Eldar Kuliyev	14	2	11+3	2	0	0	0	0
7	FW	(Brazil) BRA	Filipe Pachtmann	13	1	3+8	1	0+1	0	0+1	0
9	MF	(Belgium) BEL	Loris Brogno	30	3	18+8	3	0+2	0	0+2	0
10	MF	(Azerbaijan) AZE	Ragim Sadykhov	41	8	36	7	2+1	1	2	0
11	FW	(Azerbaijan) AZE	Rustam Akhmedzade	35	3	18+14	2	1	1	2	0
14	MF	(France) FRA	Hamidou Keyta	36	8	32	8	2	0	2	0
15	DF	(Azerbaijan) AZE	Ruslan Abishov	2	0	0+1	0	1	0	0	0
17	FW	(Guinea-Bissau) GBS	Toni Gomes	25	3	4+20	3	0+1	0	0	0
18	DF	(Azerbaijan) AZE	Slavik Alkhasov	25	0	7+13	0	3	0	1+1	0
19	FW	(Ukraine) UKR	Vladyslav Kulach	8	3	4+4	3	0	0	0	0
21	MF	(Azerbaijan) AZE	Hajiagha Hajili	31	0	18+8	0	3	0	2	0
23	MF	(Serbia) SRB	Andrija Luković	30	0	17+11	0	2	0	0	0
26	DF	(Serbia) SRB	Nemanja Anđelković	28	0	24+2	0	0	0	2	0
28	MF	(Nigeria) NGR	Abbas Ibrahim	8	0	4+4	0	0	0	0	0
32	MF	(Azerbaijan) AZE	Qismət Alıyev	39	0	30+4	0	2+1	0	2	0
38	MF	(Azerbaijan) AZE	Ramiz Muradov	1	0	0+1	0	0	0	0	0
41	GK	(Azerbaijan) AZE	Anar Nazirov	16	0	13+1	0	2	0	0	0
44	DF	(Greece) GRE	Dimitrios Chantakias	39	5	31+3	4	3	1	2	0
47	FW	(Netherlands) NED	Mo Hamdaoui	34	1	21+8	1	0+3	0	0+2	0
56	MF	(Azerbaijan) AZE	Samir Aghayev	1	0	0+1	0	0	0	0	0
66	MF	(Azerbaijan) AZE	Parviz Azadov	1	0	0+1	0	0	0	0	0
70	FW	(Niger) NIG	Issa Djibrilla	9	0	6+3	0	0	0	0	0
77	MF	(Azerbaijan) AZE	Mirsahib Abbasov	2	0	0+1	0	1	0	0	0
91	MF	(Azerbaijan) AZE	Coşqun Diniyev	35	2	21+9	2	1+2	0	2	0
96	MF	(Haiti) HAI	Wilde-Donald Guerrier	10	0	7+3	0	0	0	0	0
Players away on loan:
4	DF	(Azerbaijan) AZE	Cəlal Hüseynov	1	0	0	0	0	0	0+1	0
8	MF	(Azerbaijan) AZE	Ilkin Muradov	18	0	6+7	0	3	0	2	0
Players who left Zira during the season:
13	MF	(Azerbaijan) AZE	Ramin Ahmedov	10	0	0+7	0	0+1	0	0+2	0
19	DF	(Azerbaijan) AZE	Tamkin Khalilzade	13	0	8+3	0	1+1	0	0	0

=== Goal scorers ===
Place	Position	Nation	Number	Name	Premier League	Azerbaijan Cup	UEFA Europa Conference League	Total
1	MF	(France)	14	Hamidou Keyta	8	0	0	8
1	MF	(Azerbaijan)	10	Ragim Sadykhov	7	1	0	8
3	DF	(Azerbaijan)	2	Sertan Taşqın	5	0	0	5
3	DF	(Greece)	44	Dimitrios Chantakias	4	1	0	5
5	MF	(Belgium)	9	Loris Brogno	3	1	0	4
6	FW	(Ukraine)	19	Vladyslav Kulach	3	0	0	3
6	FW	(Guinea-Bissau)	17	Toni Gomes	3	0	0	3
6	FW	(Azerbaijan)	11	Rustam Akhmedzade	2	1	0	3
6				Own goal	3	0	0	3
10	MF	(Azerbaijan)	91	Coşqun Diniyev	2	0	0	2
10	MF	(Ukraine)	6	Eldar Kuliyev	2	0	0	2
12	FW	(Netherlands)	47	Mo Hamdaoui	1	0	0	1
12	FW	(Brazil)	7	Filipe Pachtmann	1	0	0	1
12	DF	(Benin)	5	Moïse Adiléhou	1	0	0	1
				TOTALS	45	4	0	49

=== Clean sheets ===
Place	Position	Nation	Number	Name	Premier League	Azerbaijan Cup	UEFA Europa Conference League	Total
1	GK	(Azerbaijan)	1	Mekhti Dzhenetov	7	1	1	9
2	GK	(Azerbaijan)	41	Anar Nazirov	3	1	0	4
				TOTALS	10	2	1	13

=== Disciplinary record ===
Number	Nation	Position	Name	Premier League		Azerbaijan Cup		UEFA Europa Conference League		Total	
Number	Nation	Position	Name	Yellow card	Red card	Yellow card	Red card	Yellow card	Red card	Yellow card	Red card
1	(Azerbaijan)	GK	Mekhti Dzhenetov	1	0	0	0	0	0	1	0
2	(Azerbaijan)	DF	Sertan Taşqın	5	0	0	0	0	0	5	0
5	(Guinea-Bissau)	DF	Moïse Adiléhou	4	0	0	0	0	0	4	0
6	(Ukraine)	MF	Eldar Kuliyev	1	0	0	0	0	0	1	0
7	(Brazil)	FW	Filipe Pachtmann	1	0	0	0	1	0	2	0
9	(Belgium)	MF	Loris Brogno	1	0	0	0	0	0	1	0
10	(Azerbaijan)	MF	Ragim Sadykhov	1	0	0	0	0	0	1	0
11	(Azerbaijan)	FW	Rustam Akhmedzade	2	0	0	0	0	0	2	0
14	(France)	MF	Hamidou Keyta	4	0	0	0	0	0	4	0
15	(Azerbaijan)	DF	Ruslan Abishov	1	0	0	0	0	0	1	0
17	(Portugal)	FW	Toni Gomes	2	0	0	0	0	0	2	0
18	(Azerbaijan)	DF	Slavik Alkhasov	1	0	1	0	0	0	2	0
19	(Ukraine)	FW	Vladyslav Kulach	1	0	0	0	0	0	1	0
21	(Azerbaijan)	MF	Hajiagha Hajili	7	0	3	1	1	0	11	1
23	(Serbia)	MF	Andrija Luković	4	0	0	0	0	0	4	0
28	(Nigeria)	MF	Abbas Ibrahim	2	0	0	0	0	0	2	0
32	(Azerbaijan)	MF	Qismət Alıyev	5	0	1	0	0	0	6	0
41	(Azerbaijan)	GK	Anar Nazirov	3	0	0	0	0	0	3	0
44	(Greece)	DF	Dimitrios Chantakias	5	1	0	0	0	0	5	1
47	(Netherlands)	FW	Mo Hamdaoui	2	0	0	0	0	0	2	0
70	(Niger)	FW	Issa Djibrilla	1	0	0	0	0	0	1	0
91	(Azerbaijan)	MF	Coşqun Diniyev	2	2	0	0	0	0	2	2
96	(Haiti)	MF	Wilde-Donald Guerrier	3	1	0	0	0	0	3	1
Players away on loan:
8	(Azerbaijan)	MF	Ilkin Muradov	0	0	1	0	1	0	2	0
Players who left Zira during the season:
13	(Azerbaijan)	MF	Ramin Ahmedov	1	0	0	0	0	0	1	0
19	(Azerbaijan)	DF	Tamkin Khalilzade	4	0	2	1	0	0	6	1
26	(Serbia)	DF	Nemanja Anđelković	2	1	0	0	0	0	2	1
			TOTALS	70	5	8	2	3	0	77	7
