= 2022–23 Sabail FK season =

Sabail
2022-23 season
- Chairman: Rashad Abdullayev
- Manager: Mahmud Qurbanov (until 28 December); Shahin Diniyev (from 29 December)
- Stadium: ASCO Arena
- Premier League: 9th
- Azerbaijan Cup: Semifinal vs Gabala
- Top goalscorer: League: Aghabala Ramazanov (5); All: Franco Mazurek (6)
Home colours	Away colours

The Sabail FK 2022–23 season was Sabail's sixth Azerbaijan Premier League season, and their seventh season in existence. They competed in the Premier League, finishing 9th, and reached the Semifinals of Azerbaijan Cup where they were eliminated by Gabala.

== Season events ==
Prior to the start of the season Head Coach Aftandil Hacıyev left by mutual agreement, with Mahmud Qurbanov being appointed as his replacement.

On 28 December, Mahmud Qurbanov resigned as Head Coach. The following day, 29 December, Shahin Diniyev was appointed as Sabail new Head Coach.

On 15 February, Ilkin Muradov joined Sabail on loan from Zira for the remainder of the season.

== Squad ==
As of match played 28 May 2023

No.	Name	Nationality	Position	Date of birth (age)	Signed from	Signed in	Contract ends	Apps.	Goals
Goalkeepers
1	Emil Balayev	(Azerbaijan)	GK	17 April 1994 (aged 29)	Turan	2022	2023	87	0
12	Huseynali Guliyev	(Azerbaijan)	GK	11 August 1999 (aged 23)	Sumgayit	2022		14	0
25	Sadiq Mammadzada	(Azerbaijan)	GK	29 October 2006 (aged 16)	Academy	2022		0	0
Defenders
2	Adil Naghiyev	(Azerbaijan)	DF	11 September 1995 (aged 27)	Sumgayit	2019		90	3
3	Turan Manafov	(Azerbaijan)	DF	19 September 1998 (aged 24)	Zagatala	2019		79	3
5	Petro Stasyuk	(Ukraine)	DF	24 February 1995 (aged 28)	Mariupol	2022		34	0
6	Jabir Amirli	(Azerbaijan)	DF	6 January 1997 (aged 26)	Neftçi	2021		66	1
15	Vugar Hasanov	(Azerbaijan)	DF	5 December 1997 (aged 25)	Kapaz	2022	2023	16	0
20	Mirali Ahmadov	(Azerbaijan)	DF	16 April 2003 (aged 20)	Shamakhi	2023	2024	0	0
23	Gustavo França	(Brazil)	DF	20 June 1996 (aged 26)	Leixões	2022	2023	28	0
27	Emil Martinov	(Bulgaria)	DF	18 March 1992 (aged 31)	CSKA 1948 Sofia	2022	2023	54	1
55	Nihad Gurbanli	(Azerbaijan)	DF	10 April 2001 (aged 22)	Neftçi	2022		15	0
Midfielders
4	Maksym Chekh	(Ukraine)	MF	3 January 1999 (aged 24)	on loan from Shakhtar Donetsk	2022	2023	31	2
7	Ruslan Hajiyev	(Azerbaijan)	MF	20 March 1998 (aged 25)	loan from Qarabağ	2022	2024	75	3
8	Elmir Tagiyev	(Azerbaijan)	MF	23 May 2000 (aged 23)	Turan Tovuz	2021		46	1
14	Rahid Amirguliyev	(Azerbaijan)	MF	1 September 1989 (aged 33)	Qarabağ	2018		120	2
17	Rafael Maharramli	(Azerbaijan)	MF	1 October 1999 (aged 23)	Shamakhi	2022		23	1
18	Vusal Ganbarov	(Azerbaijan)	MF	25 April 2003 (aged 20)	Shamakhi	2022		3	0
22	Samir Abdullayev	(Azerbaijan)	MF	24 April 2002 (aged 21)	Shamakhi	2022		23	0
30	Franco Mazurek	(Argentina)	MF	24 September 1993 (aged 29)	Ethnikos Achna	2022	2023	35	9
39	Tural Bayramli	(Azerbaijan)	MF	7 January 1998 (aged 25)	Pierikos	2022		12	0
77	Adilkhan Garahmadov	(Azerbaijan)	MF	5 June 2001 (aged 21)	Academy	2018		66	2
88	Matija Ljujić	(Serbia)	MF	28 October 1993 (aged 29)	Újpest	2023		16	3
96	Ilkin Muradov	(Azerbaijan)	MF	5 March 1996 (aged 27)	on loan from Zira	2023	2023	15	1
Forwards
9	Mirabdulla Abbasov	(Azerbaijan)	FW	27 April 1995 (aged 28)	Neftçi	2022	2023	34	7
10	Aghabala Ramazanov	(Azerbaijan)	FW	20 January 1993 (aged 30)	Zira	2022		66	19
11	Goba Zakpa	(Ivory Coast)	FW	17 August 1992 (aged 30)	Ethnikos Achna	2022		33	6
21	Luwagga Kizito	(Uganda)	FW	20 December 1993 (aged 29)	Hapoel Nof HaGalil	2022	2023	23	2
99	David Gomis	(Guinea-Bissau)	FW	21 December 1992 (aged 30)	Pau	2023	2023	19	3
Out on loan
Left during the season
7	Mirsahib Abbasov	(Azerbaijan)	MF	19 January 1993 (aged 30)	Zira	2019		50	4
20	Facundo Cardozo	(Argentina)	MF	6 April 1995 (aged 28)	Platense	2022	2023	15	0
22	Afran Ismayilov	(Azerbaijan)	MF	8 October 1988 (aged 34)	Keşla	2020		38	6
72	Emin Zamanov	(Azerbaijan)	MF	26 December 1997 (aged 25)	Neftçi	2022	2023	4	0

== Transfers ==
=== In ===
Date	Position	Nationality	Name	From	Fee	Ref.
19 June 2022	DF	(Azerbaijan)	Vugar Hasanov	Kapaz	Undisclosed	
20 June 2022	DF	(Bulgaria)	Emil Martinov	CSKA 1948 Sofia	Undisclosed	
21 June 2022	FW	(Uganda)	Luwagga Kizito	Hapoel Nof HaGalil	Undisclosed	
22 June 2022	MF	(Azerbaijan)	Emin Zamanov	Neftçi	Undisclosed	
24 June 2022	MF	(Azerbaijan)	Rafael Maharramli	Shamakhi	Undisclosed	
27 June 2022	DF	(Brazil)	Gustavo França	Leixões	Undisclosed	
30 June 2022	MF	(Argentina)	Franco Mazurek	Ethnikos Achna	Undisclosed	
1 July 2022	MF	(Azerbaijan)	Vusal Ganbarov	Shamakhi	Undisclosed	
1 July 2022	FW	(Azerbaijan)	Aghabala Ramazanov	Zira	Undisclosed	
1 July 2022	FW	(Ivory Coast)	Goba Zakpa	Ethnikos Achna	Undisclosed	
11 July 2022	GK	(Azerbaijan)	Emil Balayev	Turan	Undisclosed	
13 July 2022	DF	(Argentina)	Facundo Cardozo	Platense	Undisclosed	
1 August 2022	MF	(Azerbaijan)	Samir Abdullayev	Shamakhi	Undisclosed	
17 August 2022	DF	(Ukraine)	Petro Stasyuk	Mariupol	Undisclosed	
2 September 2022	FW	(Azerbaijan)	Mirabdulla Abbasov	Neftçi	Undisclosed	
15 January 2023	FW	(Guinea-Bissau)	David Gomis	Pau	Undisclosed	
29 January 2023	DF	(Azerbaijan)	Mirali Ahmadov	Shamakhi	Undisclosed	
11 February 2023	FW	(Serbia)	Matija Ljujić	Újpest	Undisclosed	

=== Loans in ===
Date from	Position	Nationality	Name	From	Date to	Ref.
1 June 2022	MF	(Azerbaijan)	Ruslan Hajiyev	Qarabağ	31 May 2024	
12 August 2022	MF	(Ukraine)	Maksym Chekh	Shakhtar Donetsk	End of season	
15 February 2023	MF	(Azerbaijan)	Ilkin Muradov	Zira	30 June 2023	

=== Out ===
Date	Position	Nationality	Name	To	Fee	Ref.
30 December 2022	MF	(Azerbaijan)	Emin Zamanov	Shamakhi	Undisclosed	

=== Loans out ===
Date from	Position	Nationality	Name	To	Date to	Ref.
	DF	(Azerbaijan)	Adil Naghiyev	Shamakhi	30 December 2022	

=== Released ===
Date	Position	Nationality	Name	Joined	Date	Ref
6 June 2022	MF	(Azerbaijan)	Afran Ismayilov	Kapaz		
12 June 2022	MF	(Azerbaijan)	Mirsahib Abbasov	Zira	12 June 2022	
31 December 2022	DF	(Argentina)	Facundo Cardozo	Arsenal de Sarandí		
31 May 2023	DF	(Brazil)	Gustavo França			
31 May 2023	FW	(Ivory Coast)	Goba Zakpa			
31 May 2023	FW	(Uganda)	Luwagga Kizito			
2 June 2023	MF	(Argentina)	Franco Mazurek	Ironi Tiberias		
2 June 2023	MF	(Azerbaijan)	Ruslan Hajiyev			
3 June 2023	DF	(Bulgaria)	Emil Martinov	Slavia Sofia		
5 June 2023	DF	(Ukraine)	Petro Stasyuk	LNZ Cherkasy		
8 June 2023	DF	(Azerbaijan)	Nihad Gurbanli	Araz-Naxçıvan		
8 June 2023	FW	(Azerbaijan)	Mirabdulla Abbasov			
9 June 2023	DF	(Azerbaijan)	Turan Manafov	Araz-Naxçıvan		
13 June 2023	GK	(Azerbaijan)	Emil Balayev	Neftçi	28 June 2023	

== Friendlies ==
	–
AZT (UTC+4)

== Competitions ==
=== Overview ===
Competition	First match	Last match	Starting round	Final position	Record							
Competition	First match	Last match	Starting round	Final position	Pld	W	D	L	GF	GA	GD	Win %
Premier League	14 August 2022	27 May 2023	Matchday 1		36	7	8	21	32	62	−30	19.44
Azerbaijan Cup	22 November 2022	27 April 2023	First Round	Semifinal	5	3	0	2	10	6	+4	60.00
Total					41	10	8	23	42	68	−26	24.39

Last updated: 28 May 2023
Source: Competitions

=== Premier League ===
==== Results summary ====
Overall								Home						Away					
Pld	W	D	L	GF	GA	GD	Pts	W	D	L	GF	GA	GD	W	D	L	GF	GA	GD
36	7	8	21	32	62	−30	29	6	4	8	17	22	−5	1	4	13	15	40	−25

Last updated: 28 May 2023.
Source: See Results

==== Results by round ====
Round	1	2	3	4	5	6	7	8	9	10	11	12	13	14	15	16	17	18	19	20	21	22	23	24	25	26	27	28	29	30	31	32	33	34	35	36
Ground	A	H	A	H	A	H	H	H	H	A	H	A	H	A	A	A	A	H	A	H	A	H	A	H	H	A	H	A	H	A	H	A	A	H	A	H
Result	L	L	D	W	D	L	L	L	W	D	D	L	L	L	L	L	L	L	L	W	L	W	L	D	L	L	D	L	W	L	D	L	W	L	D	W
Position	8	7	7	6	7	7	7	7	7	7	7	7	7	7	8	8	10	10	10	9	10	9	10	10	10	10	10	10	10	10	10	10	9	9	9	9

Updated to match(es) played on 28 May 2023. Source: See Results
A = Away; H = Home; W = Win; D = Draw; L = Loss

==== Results ====
6 August 2022 1	Qarabağ	3 – 1	Sabail	Baku
20:00 AZT (UTC+4)	Mustafazadə (yellow card) 3'; Romão (yellow card) 25'; Qurbanlı 42'; Sheydayev 45+2' (pen.), 47'; Mammadov (yellow card) 52'; Qarayev (yellow card) 71'	Report	Taghiyev 72' (yellow card) 86'	Stadium: Azersun Arena; Referee: Rauf Jabbarov

13 August 2022 2	Sabail	0 – 1	Turan Tovuz	Baku
20:30 AZT (UTC+4)	Manafov (yellow card) 62'; Zamanov (yellow card) 88'; Hajiyev (yellow card) 90+8'	Report	Seyidov (yellow card) 13'; Oduwa 48' (yellow card) 49'	Stadium: Bayil Arena; Referee: Rauf Allahverdiyev

19 August 2022 3	Shamakhi	1 – 1	Sabail	Shamakhi
16:30 AZT (UTC+4)	Mammadov (yellow card) 56'; Yunanov 72'	Report	Hajiyev 20'; Zamanov (yellow card) 34'; Ramazanov (yellow card) 56'	Stadium: City Stadium; Referee: Vugar Hasanli

27 August 2022 4	Sabail	4 – 1	Kapaz	Baku
18:00 AZT (UTC+4)	Hasanov (yellow card) 48'; Zakpa 52'; Mazurek 55'; Ramazanov 74', 90+5'; Abdullayev (yellow card) 81'; Tagiyev (yellow card) 90+1'	Report	Ismayilov 11'; Aliyev (red card) 69'; Akhundov (yellow card) 90+1' (yellow-red card) 90+3'	Stadium: Bayil Arena; Referee: Tural Qurbanov

4 September 2022 5	Sabah	0 – 0	Sabail	Masazır
18:00 AZT (UTC+4)	Volkovi (yellow card) 24'; Mickels (yellow card) 90+5'	Report	Ramazanov (yellow card) 59'; Manafov (yellow card) 64'; França (yellow card) 90+5'	Stadium: Bank Respublika Arena; Referee: Nicat İsmayıllı

10 September 2022 6	Sabail	1 – 2	Zira	Baku
20:30 AZT (UTC+4)	Ramazanov 13'; Zakpa (yellow card) 38'; Bayramli (yellow card) 65' (yellow-red card) 72'; Stasyuk (yellow card) 78'; Mazurek (yellow card) 80'	Report	Chantakias 5'; Taşqın 33'; Nazirov (yellow card) 87'; Ahmedov (yellow card) 90+5'; Alkhasov (yellow card) 90+6'	Stadium: Bayil Arena; Referee: Rauf Allahverdiyev

16 September 2022 7	Sabail	0 – 2	Neftçi	Baku
20:30 AZT (UTC+4)	França (yellow card) 70'	Report	Yusifli (yellow card) 11'; Mahmudov 53'; Pato 83'	Stadium: Bayil Arena; Referee: Aliyar Agayev

30 September 2022 8	Sabail	1 – 2	Gabala	Baku
19:00 AZT (UTC+4)	França (yellow card) 33' (yellow-red card) 44'; Gurbanli (yellow card) 53'; Ramazanov 61' (pen.); Chekh (yellow card) 90'	Report	Alimi (yellow card) 23' (goal) 54' (pen.); Isgandarov 90'; Safarov (yellow card) 90'	Stadium: Bayil Arena; Referee: Farid Haciyev

8 October 2022 9	Sabail	1 – 0	Sumgayit	Baku
17:00 AZT (UTC+4)	Manafov 38' (yellow card) 45+3'	Report	Mustafayev (yellow card) 45+2'; Todoroski (yellow card) 45+3'	Stadium: Bayil Arena; Referee: Ravan Hamzazada

15 October 2022 10	Turan Tovuz	2 – 2	Sabail	Tovuz
15:00 AZT (UTC+4)	Wankewai 9' (pen.); Okebugwu 32' (yellow card) 63'; Xulu (yellow card) 45+1'; Oduwa (yellow card) 54'	Report	Mazurek 12'; Ramazanov (yellow card) 45+1' (goal) 54'	Stadium: City Stadium; Referee: Kamal Umudlu

23 October 2022 11	Sabail	0 – 0	Shamakhi	Baku
16:00 AZT (UTC+4)	Gurbanli (yellow card) 18'; Tagiyev (yellow card) 37'; Hajiyev (yellow card) 40'; Bayramli (red card) 42'	Report	Hüseynli (yellow card) 20'; Mirzayev (yellow card) 45+1'; Naghiyev (yellow card) 90+2'	Stadium: Bayil Arena; Referee: Ingilab Mammadov

29 October 2022 12	Kapaz	3 – 0	Sabail	Ganja
15:00 AZT (UTC+4)	Kantaria (yellow card) 4'; Shuaibu 36', 66'; Kvirkvia (yellow card) 57'; F.Nabiyev 84'; Ergemlidze (yellow card) 89'	Report	Zakpa (yellow card) 17'; Gurbanli (red card) 40'; França (yellow card) 52'; Mazurek (yellow card) 56'; Tagiyev (yellow card) 69'	Stadium: Ganja City; Referee: Elcin Masiyev

6 November 2022 13	Sabail	0 – 2	Sabah	Baku
15:00 AZT (UTC+4)		Report	Seydiyev (yellow card) 14'; J.Nuriyev 37'; Kashchuk 47'	Stadium: Bayil Arena; Referee: Aliyar Agayev

12 November 2022 14	Zira	1 – 0	Sabail	Zirə
16:00 AZT (UTC+4)	Brogno (yellow card) 61'; Khalilzade (yellow card) 68'; Sadykhov 73'	Report	Martinov (yellow card) 68'	Stadium: Zira Olympic Sport Complex Stadium; Referee: Vugar Hasanli

27 November 2022 15	Neftçi	3 – 1	Sabail	Baku
17:00 AZT (UTC+4)	Mahmudov 27', 51' (pen.), 77' (pen.); Pato (yellow card) 32'	Report	Kizito (yellow card) 43'; Maharramli 63'; Chekh (yellow card) 74'; Stasyuk (yellow card) 75'; França (yellow card) 82'	Stadium: Bakcell Arena; Referee: Farid Haciyev

3 December 2022 16	Gabala	2 – 1	Sabail	Qabala
14:30 AZT (UTC+4)	Abu Akel 35' (yellow card) 90'; Isgandarov 65'	Report	Kizito 5'; Cardozo (yellow card) 38'; Chekh (yellow card) 57'	Stadium: City Stadium; Referee: Raad Ahmadov

14 December 2022 17	Sumgayit	2 – 0	Sabail	Sumgait
19:00 AZT (UTC+4)	Pereira 9' (yellow card) 27'; Isgandarli 54' (yellow card) 57'; Ahmadov (yellow card) 56'	Report	Maharramli (yellow card) 29'; Martinov (yellow card) 45+2'	Stadium: Kapital Bank Arena; Referee: Tural Qurbanov

24 December 2022 18	Sabail	0 – 3	Qarabağ	Baku
17:30 AZT (UTC+4)	Amirli (yellow card) 75'; Martinov (yellow card) 78'	Report	Mustafazadə (yellow card) 26'; Sheydayev 61'; Cafarguliyev (yellow card) 75'; Qurbanlı 82'; Zoubir 88'	Stadium: Bayil Arena; Referee: Vuqar Hasanli

26 January 2023 19	Shamakhi	2 – 1	Sabail	Shamakhi
14:00 AZT (UTC+4)	Agjabayov (yellow card) 32'; Qasımov 57'; Yunanov 90' (pen.)	Report	Zakpa 33'; Naghiyev (yellow card) 90+2'	Stadium: City Stadium; Referee: Javid Jalilov

31 January 2023 20	Sabail	1 – 0	Kapaz	Baku
18:00 AZT (UTC+4)	Tagiyev (yellow card) 15'; Chekh (yellow card) 52'; Naghiyev (yellow card) 60'; França (yellow card) 70'; Mazurek 77'	Report	Kantaria (yellow card) 13'; Y.Nabiyev (yellow card) 17'; Aliyev (yellow card) 41'	Stadium: Bayil Arena; Referee: Tural Qurbanov

6 February 2023 21	Sabah	4 – 0	Sabail	Masazır
18:00 AZT (UTC+4)	Mickels 4'; Volkovi 10', 31'; Irazabal (red card) 68'; Apeh 83'	Report	França (yellow card) 62'; Amirguliyev (yellow card) 69' (yellow-red card) 78'	Stadium: Bank Respublika Arena; Referee: Ingilab Mammadov

12 February 2023 22	Sabail	2 – 0	Zira	Baku
15:00 AZT (UTC+4)	Zakpa (yellow card) 20'; Tagiyev (yellow card) 35'; Gomis 48'; Abdullayev (yellow card) 64'; Abbasov 78'	Report	Hamdaoui (yellow card) 66'; Alıyev (yellow card) 90+4'	Stadium: Bayil Arena; Referee: Rauf Jabarov

18 February 2023 23	Neftçi	3 – 0	Sabail	Baku
17:30 AZT (UTC+4)	Aliyev (yellow card) 6'; Saief 8' (pen.); Mahmudov 48' (pen.); Saldanha 74'; Eddy (yellow card) 77'	Report	Taghiyev (yellow card) 45'; França (yellow card) 45+3'; Balayev (yellow card) 47'; Zakpa (yellow card) 72'	Stadium: Bakcell Arena; Referee: Kamranbay Rahimov

24 February 2023 24	Sabail	2 – 2	Gabala	Baku
19:00 AZT (UTC+4)	Abbasov 51'; Ljujić 55'; Taghiyev (yellow card) 89'	Report	França 20' (o.g.); Ruan (yellow card) 53'; Ramon 70'	Stadium: Bayil Arena; Referee: Javid Jalilov

4 March 2023 25	Sabail	0 – 1	Sumgayit	Baku
16:00 AZT (UTC+4)	Chekh (yellow card) 55'; França (red card) 63'; Ramazanov (yellow card) 85'; Amirli (yellow card) 90+7'	Report	Murata (yellow card) 55'; Badalov (yellow card) 61'; Tisdell 90+7' (pen.)	Stadium: Bayil Arena; Referee: Raad Ahmədov

11 March 2023 26	Qarabağ	3 – 0	Sabail	Baku
18:00 AZT (UTC+4)	Cafarguliyev 24'; Qurbanlı 34'; Romão 53'	Report	Kizito (yellow card) 61'	Stadium: Azersun Arena; Referee: Ravan Hamzazada

16 March 2023 27	Sabail	1 – 1	Turan Tovuz	Baku
16:00 AZT (UTC+4)	Gomis 29'; Ljujić (yellow card) 44'	Report	Valizade (yellow card) 26' (goal) 45'	Stadium: Bayil Arena; Referee: Aliyar Ağayev

1 April 2023 28	Kapaz	1 – 0	Sabail	Ganja
15:30 AZT (UTC+4)	Y.Nabiyev (yellow card) 10'; Shuaibu 70' (yellow card) 70'	Report	Stasyuk (yellow card) 12'; Ljujić (yellow card) 65'; Naghiyev (yellow card) 85'	Stadium: Ganja City; Referee: Tural Qurbanov

8 April 2023 29	Sabail	2 – 1	Sabah	Baku
17:30 AZT (UTC+4)	Gomis 29'; Zakpa 90+5'	Report	Seydiyev (yellow card) 7'; Letić (yellow card) 21'; Isayev (yellow card) 24'; Irazabal (red card) 59'; Apeh 75' (pen.); Camalov (yellow card) 83'	Stadium: Bayil Arena; Referee: Ingilab Məmmədov

14 April 2023 30	Zira	3 – 1	Sabail	Zirə
17:30 AZT (UTC+4)	Kulach 52'; Akhmedzade 69'; Kuliyev 90'	Report	Zakpa 90+5'	Stadium: Zira Olympic Sport Complex Stadium; Referee: Javid Jaliliov

22 April 2023 31	Sabail	1 – 1	Neftçi	Baku
18:30 AZT (UTC+4)	Ramazanov (yellow card) 2'; Tagiyev (yellow card) 23'; Chekh 31'; Gomis (yellow card) 39'; Naghiyev (yellow card) 86'	Report	Bogomolsky 7'; Arveladze (yellow card) 31'; Saldanha (yellow card) 86'; Buludov (yellow card) 87'	Stadium: Bayil Arena; Referee: Ravan Hamzazada

1 May 2023 32	Gabala	4 – 2	Sabail	Qabala
17:30 AZT (UTC+4)	Ramon 21', 90+4'; Stasyuk (yellow card) 38'; Allach 49'	Report	Tagiyev (yellow card) 35'; Ljujić (yellow card) 39'; Hajiyev 69'; Abbasov 85'	Stadium: City Stadium; Referee: Rauf Allahverdiyev

7 May 2023 33	Sumgayit	1 – 3	Sabail	Sumgait
19:00 AZT (UTC+4)	Isgandarli (yellow card) 35'; Todoroski 37' (yellow card) 88'; Süleymanly (yellow card) 84'	Report	Hasanov (yellow card) 39'; Muradov (yellow card) 45'; Ljujić 70', 73'; Manafov (yellow card) 84'; Mazurek 90'	Stadium: Kapital Bank Arena; Referee: Ingilab Mammadov

13 May 2023 34	Sabail	0 – 3	Qarabağ	Baku
20:30 AZT (UTC+4)		Report	Medina (yellow card) 17'; Mustafazadə 71'; Sheydayev 77' (pen.), 86'	Stadium: Bayil Arena; Referee: Kamal Umudlu

22 May 2023 35	Turan Tovuz	2 – 2	Sabail	Tovuz
16:30 AZT (UTC+4)	Muradov (yellow card) 69'; Mazurek 73'; Zakpa 90+3'	Report	Aliyev 3' (yellow card) 69'; Miller (yellow card) 8'; Guseynov 49'	Stadium: City Stadium; Referee: Ravan Hamzazada

28 May 2023 36	Sabail	1 – 0	Shamakhi	Baku
20:00 AZT (UTC+4)	França (yellow card) 44'; Mazurek 45+1'; Martinov (yellow card) 76'; Tagiyev (red card) 90+4'; Balayev (yellow card) 90+4'; Amirli (yellow card) 90+4'	Report	Yunanov (yellow card) 76'; Agjabayov (yellow card) 90+4'; Dashdamirov (yellow card) 90+4'; Valiyev (yellow card) 90+4'	Stadium: Bayil Arena; Referee: Ingilab Mammadov

==== League table ====
Pos	Team	Pld	W	D	L	GF	GA	GD	Pts	Qualification
6	Turan Tovuz	36	10	9	17	36	49	−13	39	
7	Sumgayit	36	8	7	21	26	70	−44	31	
8	Kapaz	36	6	13	17	34	62	−28	31	
9	Sabail	36	7	8	21	32	62	−30	29	
10	Shamakhi (R)	36	4	13	19	26	52	−26	25	Relegation to Azerbaijan First Division

Source: Soccerway
Rules for classification: 1) Points; 2) Head-to-head points; 3) Head-to-head goal difference; 4) Head-to-head goals scored; 5) Head-to-head away goals scored (only if two teams); 6) Goal difference; 7) Goals scored.
(R) Relegated

=== Azerbaijan Cup ===
22 November 2022 First Round	MOIK Baku	0 – 4	Sabail	Baku
14:00 AZT (UTC+4)		Report	Mazurek 18'; Garahmadov 30'; Stasyuk (yellow card) 53'; Abdullayev (yellow card) 60'; Abbasov 75'; Chekh 90'	Stadium: Bine Stadium; Referee: Ali Aliyev

9 December 2022 Quarterfinal 1st leg	Sabail	3 – 2	Sabah	Baku
17:00 AZT (UTC+4)	Kizito 32'; Mazurek 62', 72'	Report	Mehbaliyev (red card) 12'; Ba (yellow card) 36'; Letić (yellow card) 45+1'; Camalov (yellow card) 58'; Ceballos 80'; Volkovi 90+4'	Stadium: Bayil Arena; Referee: Nijat Ismayilli

19 December 2022 Quarterfinal 2nd leg	Sabah	0 – 1 (2 – 4 agg.)	Sabail	Masazır
19:00 AZT (UTC+4)	Mickels (yellow card) 45+1'	Report	Taghiyev (yellow card) 45+3'; Zakpa 74'; Gurbanli (yellow card) 89'	Stadium: Bank Respublika Arena; Referee: Elçin Masiyev

18 April 2023 Semifinal 1st leg	Gabala	3 – 2	Sabail	Qabala
18:00 AZT (UTC+4)	Mammadov (yellow card) 30'; Utzig 34', 66'; Abbasov (yellow card) 44'; Santos 74'	Report	Martinov (yellow card) 7' (goal) 21'; Muradov 9'	Stadium: City Stadium; Attendance: 1,300; Referee: Elchin Masiyev

27 April 2023 Semifinal 2nd leg	Sabail	0 – 1 (2 – 4 agg.)	Gabala	Baku
20:00 AZT (UTC+4)	Hasanov (yellow card) 28' (yellow-red card) 47'; Naghiyev (yellow card) 63' (yellow-red card) 90+5'; Gomis (yellow card) 68'; Ljujić (yellow card) 75'; França (yellow card) 78' (yellow-red card) 90+1'	Report	Alimi 48' (pen.) (yellow card) 75'; Utzig (yellow card) 73'; Abu Akel (yellow card) 90+1'; Mammadov (yellow card) 90+2'	Stadium: Bayil Arena; Attendance: 1,300; Referee: Aliyar Agayev

== Squad statistics ==
As of match played 28 May 2023

=== Appearances and goals ===
No.	Pos	Nat	Player	Total		Premier League		Azerbaijan Cup	
No.	Pos	Nat	Player	Apps	Goals	Apps	Goals	Apps	Goals
1	GK	(Azerbaijan) AZE	Emil Balayev	35	0	32+1	0	2	0
2	DF	(Azerbaijan) AZE	Adil Naghiyev	19	0	17	0	1+1	0
3	DF	(Azerbaijan) AZE	Turan Manafov	18	1	12+5	1	1	0
4	DF	(Ukraine) UKR	Maksym Chekh	31	2	23+6	1	1+1	1
5	DF	(Ukraine) UKR	Petro Stasyuk	30	0	23+3	0	4	0
6	DF	(Azerbaijan) AZE	Jabir Amirli	38	0	29+4	0	5	0
7	MF	(Azerbaijan) AZE	Ruslan Hajiyev	24	2	7+15	2	2	0
8	MF	(Azerbaijan) AZE	Elmir Tagiyev	33	1	19+12	1	1+1	0
9	FW	(Azerbaijan) AZE	Mirabdulla Abbasov	21	4	5+14	3	0+2	1
10	FW	(Azerbaijan) AZE	Aghabala Ramazanov	26	5	20+3	5	2+1	0
11	FW	(Ivory Coast) CIV	Goba Zakpa	33	6	23+7	5	3	1
12	GK	(Azerbaijan) AZE	Huseynali Guliyev	8	0	4+1	0	3	0
14	MF	(Azerbaijan) AZE	Rahid Amirguliyev	16	0	8+4	0	4	0
15	DF	(Azerbaijan) AZE	Vugar Hasanov	16	0	11+2	0	2+1	0
17	MF	(Azerbaijan) AZE	Rafael Maharramli	23	1	14+6	1	3	0
18	MF	(Azerbaijan) AZE	Vusal Ganbarov	3	0	0+2	0	1	0
21	FW	(Uganda) UGA	Luwagga Kizito	23	3	8+11	2	3+1	1
22	MF	(Azerbaijan) AZE	Samir Abdullayev	23	0	7+14	0	0+2	0
23	DF	(Brazil) BRA	Gustavo França	28	0	23+3	0	2	0
27	DF	(Bulgaria) BUL	Emil Martinov	30	1	15+10	0	5	1
30	MF	(Argentina) ARG	Franco Mazurek	35	9	28+4	6	3	3
39	MF	(Azerbaijan) AZE	Tural Bayramli	3	0	1+2	0	0	0
55	DF	(Azerbaijan) AZE	Nihad Gurbanli	15	0	10+2	0	3	0
77	MF	(Azerbaijan) AZE	Adilkhan Garahmadov	11	1	2+7	0	0+2	1
88	MF	(Serbia) SRB	Matija Ljujić	16	3	12+2	3	0+2	0
96	MF	(Azerbaijan) AZE	Ilkin Muradov	15	1	11+2	0	1+1	1
99	FW	(Guinea-Bissau) GBS	David Gomis	19	3	15+3	3	1	0
Players away on loan:
Players who left Sabail during the season:
20	DF	(Argentina) ARG	Facundo Cardozo	15	0	12+1	0	2	0
72	MF	(Azerbaijan) AZE	Emin Zamanov	4	0	1+3	0	0	0

=== Goal scorers ===
Place	Position	Nation	Number	Name	Premier League	Azerbaijan Cup	Total
1	MF	(Argentina)	30	Franco Mazurek	6	3	9
2	FW	(Ivory Coast)	11	Goba Zakpa	5	1	6
3	FW	(Azerbaijan)	10	Aghabala Ramazanov	5	0	5
4	FW	(Azerbaijan)	9	Mirabdulla Abbasov	3	1	4
5	FW	(Guinea-Bissau)	99	David Gomis	3	0	3
5	MF	(Serbia)	88	Matija Ljujić	3	0	3
7	MF	(Azerbaijan)	7	Ruslan Hajiyev	2	0	2
7	FW	(Uganda)	21	Luwagga Kizito	1	1	2
7	MF	(Ukraine)	4	Maksym Chekh	1	1	2
10	MF	(Azerbaijan)	8	Elmir Tagiyev	1	0	1
10	DF	(Azerbaijan)	3	Turan Manafov	1	0	1
10	MF	(Azerbaijan)	17	Rafael Maharramli	1	0	1
10	MF	(Azerbaijan)	77	Adilkhan Garahmadov	0	1	1
10	DF	(Bulgaria)	27	Emil Martinov	0	1	1
10	MF	(Azerbaijan)	96	Ilkin Muradov	0	1	1
				TOTALS	32	10	42

=== Clean sheets ===
Place	Position	Nation	Number	Name	Premier League	Azerbaijan Cup	Total
1	GK	(Azerbaijan)	1	Emil Balayev	6	1	7
1	GK	(Azerbaijan)	12	Huseynali Guliyev	1	1	2
				TOTALS	6	2	8

Balayev & Quliyev both played in Sabail's 1-0 win over Sumgayit on 8 October 2022

=== Disciplinary record ===
Number	Nation	Position	Name	Premier League		Azerbaijan Cup		Total	
Number	Nation	Position	Name	Yellow card	Red card	Yellow card	Red card	Yellow card	Red card
1	(Azerbaijan)	GK	Emil Balayev	2	0	0	0	2	0
2	(Azerbaijan)	DF	Adil Naghiyev	4	0	2	1	6	1
3	(Azerbaijan)	DF	Turan Manafov	4	0	0	0	4	0
4	(Ukraine)	MF	Maksym Chekh	5	0	0	0	5	0
5	(Ukraine)	DF	Petro Stasyuk	3	0	0	0	3	0
6	(Azerbaijan)	DF	Jabir Amirli	3	0	0	0	3	0
7	(Azerbaijan)	MF	Ruslan Hajiyev	2	0	0	0	2	0
8	(Azerbaijan)	MF	Elmir Tagiyev	10	1	1	0	11	1
10	(Azerbaijan)	FW	Aghabala Ramazanov	5	0	0	0	5	0
11	(Ivory Coast)	FW	Goba Zakpa	4	0	0	0	4	0
14	(Azerbaijan)	MF	Rahid Amirguliyev	2	1	0	0	2	1
15	(Azerbaijan)	DF	Vugar Hasanov	2	0	2	1	4	1
17	(Azerbaijan)	MF	Rafael Maharramli	1	0	0	0	1	0
21	(Uganda)	FW	Luwagga Kizito	2	0	0	0	2	0
22	(Azerbaijan)	MF	Samir Abdullayev	2	0	1	0	3	0
23	(Brazil)	DF	Gustavo França	10	2	2	1	12	3
27	(Bulgaria)	DF	Emil Martinov	4	0	1	0	5	0
30	(Argentina)	MF	Franco Mazurek	2	0	0	0	2	0
39	(Azerbaijan)	MF	Tural Bayramli	2	2	0	0	2	2
55	(Azerbaijan)	DF	Nihad Gurbanli	2	1	1	0	3	1
88	(Serbia)	MF	Matija Ljujić	3	0	1	0	4	0
96	(Azerbaijan)	MF	Ilkin Muradov	2	0	0	0	2	0
99	(Guinea-Bissau)	FW	David Gomis	1	0	1	0	2	0
Players who left Sabail during the season:
20	(Argentina)	DF	Facundo Cardozo	1	0	0	0	1	0
72	(Azerbaijan)	MF	Emin Zamanov	2	0	0	0	2	0
			TOTALS	74	7	12	3	86	10
