= 2024–25 Kapaz PFK season =

Kapaz PFK
2024–25 season
- Manager: Adil Şükürov (until 29 August); Azər Bağırov (from 1 September)
- Stadium: Ganja City Stadium; Tovuz City Stadium (temporary)
- Premier League: 9th
- Azerbaijan Cup: Quarter-final vs Neftçi
- Top goalscorer: League: Orkhan Aliyev (4); Pachu (4); All: Orkhan Aliyev (4); Pachu (4); Karim L'Koucha (4)
- Average home league attendance: 1,033
- Biggest win: Ağdaş 0–6 Kapaz

The 2024–25 season is the 66th season of Kapaz PFK and their third consecutive in the Azerbaijan Premier League. The club also competed in the Azerbaijan Cup.

== Season events ==
On 10 January, Kapaz announced the signing of Rati Ardazishvili from Samtredia.

On 16 January, Kapaz announced the signing of Shervoni Mabatshoyev from Istiklol.

On 25 January, Kapaz announced the signing of Trent Buhagiar from Brescia.

On 3 February, Kapaz announced the loan signing of Sadiq Shafiyev from Turan Tovuz until the end of the season.

== Squad ==
As of 30 January 2025

Note: Flags indicate national team as defined under FIFA eligibility rules; some limited exceptions apply. Players may hold more than one non-FIFA nationality.

No.	Pos.	Nation	Player
1	GK	POR	Rógerio
2	DF	AZE	Ilkin Qirtimov
3	MF	MLI	Mahamadou Ba
5	DF	AZE	Rauf Hüseynli
6	DF	AZE	Nemat Musayev
7	DF	AZE	Ehtiram Shahverdiyev
8	MF	AZE	Elmir Taghiyev
9	FW	BRA	Pachu
10	FW	ESP	Karim L'Koucha
11	FW	MLT	Trent Buhagiar
12	DF	AZE	Turan Manafov
15	MF	AZE	Javad Karimov
17	MF	AZE	Umid Samadov

No.	Pos.	Nation	Player
18	GK	AZE	Elgün Bayramov
19	FW	AZE	Sadiq Shafiyev (on loan from Turan Tovuz)
21	MF	AZE	Jamal Jafarov (on loan from Sabah)
22	GK	AZE	Mammad Hüseynov
26	MF	ANG	Paná
28	MF	GEO	Rati Ardazishvili
29	DF	POR	Diogo Verdasca
44	FW	AZE	Nihat Faraci
70	FW	AZE	Nijat Suleymanov
78	DF	BLR	Yegor Khvalko
80	FW	AZE	Tural Rzayev
88	MF	TJK	Shervoni Mabatshoyev
99	MF	AZE	Ali Samadov

=== Out on loan ===
Note: Flags indicate national team as defined under FIFA eligibility rules; some limited exceptions apply. Players may hold more than one non-FIFA nationality.

No.	Pos.	Nation	Player
11	FW	AZE	Elnur Jafarov (at Imishli)

== Transfers ==
=== In ===
Date	Position	Nationality	Name	From	Fee	Ref.
4 July 2024	MF	(Azerbaijan)	Elmir Taghiyev	Sabail	Undisclosed	
6 July 2024	MF	(Azerbaijan)	Nijat Suleymanov	Araz-Naxçıvan	Undisclosed	
10 July 2024	GK	(Portugal)	Rogerio	Vilaverdense	Undisclosed	
11 July 2024	MF	(Spain)	Karim L'Koucha	UE Santa Coloma	Undisclosed	
12 July 2024	GK	(Azerbaijan)	Mammad Huseynov	Zira	Undisclosed	
13 July 2024	FW	(Mali)	Lassana N'Diaye	Botev Vratsa	Undisclosed	
21 July 2024	FW	(Albania)	Redon Mihana	Erzeni	Undisclosed	
29 July 2024	DF	(Azerbaijan)	İlkin Qırtımov	Gabala	Undisclosed	
31 July 2024	FW	(Brazil)	João Braga	Águia de Marabá	Undisclosed	
15 August 2024	FW	(Georgia (country))	Orkhan Aliyev	Araz-Naxçıvan	Undisclosed	
22 August 2024	MF	(Brazil)	Keverton	Hercílio Luz	Undisclosed	
3 September 2024	DF	(Azerbaijan)	Rauf Huseynli	Gabala	Undisclosed	
10 September 2024	DF	(Georgia (country))	Turan Manafov	Araz-Naxçıvan	Undisclosed	
10 September 2024	MF	(Angola)	Paná	Sabail	Undisclosed	
10 January 2025	MF	(Georgia (country))	Rati Ardazishvili	Samtredia	Undisclosed	
16 January 2025	FW	(Tajikistan)	Shervoni Mabatshoyev	Istiklol	Undisclosed	
25 January 2025	FW	(Malta)	Trent Buhagiar	Brescia	Undisclosed	

=== Loans in ===
Date from	Position	Nationality	Name	From	Date to	Ref.
3 February 2025	MF	(Azerbaijan)	Sadiq Shafiyev	Turan Tovuz	End of the season	

=== Loans out ===
Date from	Position	Nationality	Name	To	Date to	Ref.
12 January 2025	FW	(Azerbaijan)	Mahir Hasanov	Difai Ağsu	End of the season	

=== Released ===
Date	Position	Nationality	Name	Joined	Date	Ref
8 January 2025	MF	(Brazil)	Keverton	Goiatuba		
8 January 2025	FW	(Azerbaijan)	Orkhan Aliyev	Turan Tovuz		
27 January 2025	FW	(Mali)	Lassana N'Diaye	Mesaimeer	3 February 2025	
29 January 2025	FW	(Albania)	Redon Mihana	Hamrun Spartans	31 January 2025	
30 January 2025	FW	(Brazil)	João Braga	Rio Branco		

== Competitions ==
=== Overview ===
Competition	First match	Last match	Starting round	Final position	Record							
Competition	First match	Last match	Starting round	Final position	Pld	W	D	L	GF	GA	GD	Win %
Premier League	3 August 2024	25 May 2025	Matchday 1	9th	36	8	8	20	28	65	−37	22.22
Azerbaijan Cup	3 December 2024	1 June 2025	Second round	Quarter-final	4	2	0	2	7	3	+4	50.00
Total					40	10	8	22	35	68	−33	25.00

Last updated: 25 May 2025
Source: Competitions

=== Premier League ===
==== League table ====
Pos	Team	Pld	W	D	L	GF	GA	GD	Pts	Qualification or relegation
6	Neftçi	36	10	13	13	39	49	−10	43	
7	Shamakhi	36	9	9	18	32	46	−14	36	
8	Sumgayit	36	9	6	21	31	53	−22	33	
9	Kapaz	36	8	8	20	28	65	−37	32	
10	Sabail (R)	36	4	10	22	28	59	−31	22	Relegation to Azerbaijan First League

Source: Soccerway
Rules for classification: 1) Points; 2) Matches won; 3) Goal difference; 4) Goals scored; 5) Head-to-head points; 6) Head-to-head goal difference; 7) Lower number of points based on yellow and red cards; 8) Draw.
(R) Relegated

==== Results summary ====
Overall								Home						Away					
Pld	W	D	L	GF	GA	GD	Pts	W	D	L	GF	GA	GD	W	D	L	GF	GA	GD
36	8	8	20	28	65	−37	32	6	5	7	19	29	−10	2	3	13	9	36	−27

Last updated: 25 May 2025.

==== Results by round ====
Round	1	2	3	4	5	6	7	8	9	10	11	12	13	14	15	16	17	18	19	20	21	22	23	24	25	26	27	28	29	30	31	32	33	34	35	36
Ground	A	A	H	A	H	A	H	A	H	H	A	H	A	H	A	H	A	H	H	A	H	A	H	A	H	A	H	H	A	H	A	H	A	H	A	A
Result	L	L	L	L	L	L	L	L	W	L	L	W	D	L	W	L	L	D	W	L	W	D	D	L	W	L	D	D	W	D	L	L	D	W	L	L
Position																																				

Updated to match(es) played on 25 May 2025. Source:
A = Away; H = Home; W = Win; D = Draw; L = Loss

==== Matches ====
3 August 2024 1	Sumgayit	2–0	Kapaz	Sumgait
20:45 AZT (UTC+4)	Abdullazade 14' (yellow card) 90'; Sadykhov 72'; Badalov (yellow card) 74'	Report	U.Samadov (yellow card) 29'; Taghiyev (yellow card) 53'; Musayev (yellow card) 86'	Stadium: City Stadium; Attendance: 1,200; Referee: Kamal Umudlu

9 August 2024 2	Qarabağ	3–0	Kapaz	Baku
20:00 AZT (UTC+4)	Richard 48'; Zoubir 72'; Juninho 84'	Report	A.Samadov (yellow card) 23'; Taghiyev (yellow card) 26' (yellow-red card) 78'; Khvalko (yellow card) 34'; Qirtimov (yellow card) 89'; Atakişiyev (yellow card) 89'	Stadium: Azersun Arena; Attendance: 2,000; Referee: Rauf Allahverdiyev

17 August 2024 3	Kapaz	0–3	Turan Tovuz	Tovuz
18:15 AZT (UTC+4)	Braga (yellow card) 50'; U.Samadov (yellow card) 76'; Atakishiyev (yellow card) 84'; Shahverdiyev (yellow card) 90+2'	Report	Najafov 15'; Miller 19'; S.Aliyev (yellow card) 45+2'; Christian 62'; Souza (yellow card) 66'	Stadium: City Stadium; Attendance: 5,500; Referee: Cavid Cəlilov

23 August 2024 4	Sabail	4–0	Kapaz	Baku
19:00 AZT (UTC+4)	F.Nabiyev 12'; Sofir 34'; Bouali 50' (yellow card) 74'; Allouch 54'	Report	Şahverdiyev (yellow card) 21'; Taghiyev (yellow card) 57'	Stadium: Bayil Arena; Attendance: 500; Referee: Rauf Allahverdiyev

31 August 2024 5	Kapaz	2–3	Sabah	Tovuz
19:30 AZT (UTC+4)	Braga 10'; N'Diaye 17'; Aliyev (yellow card) 48'; Keverton (yellow card) 52'; Khvalko (yellow card) 66'	Report	Chakla (yellow card) 40'; Mickels 53' (pen.), 85'; Nuriyev (yellow card) 67'; Sekidika 70'	Stadium: City Stadium; Attendance: 400; Referee: Nicat İsmayıllı

13 September 2024 6	Araz-Naxçıvan	1–0	Kapaz	Baku
19:30 AZT (UTC+4)	Nuno (yellow card) 45'; Benny 76'; Buludov (yellow card) 84'	Report		Stadium: Dalga Arena; Attendance: 100; Referee: Rəvan Həmzəzadə

20 September 2024 7	Kapaz	0–2	Shamakhi	Tovuz
17:00 AZT (UTC+4)	Taghiyev (yellow card) 22'	Report	Konaté 16'; Kantaria 19'; Bakić (yellow card) 75'; Zamanov (yellow card) 79'; Fernandes (yellow card) 90+4'	Stadium: City Stadium; Attendance: 400; Referee: Cavid Cəlilov

28 September 2024 8	Zira	3–0	Kapaz	Zirə
17:00 AZT (UTC+4)	Soumah (yellow card) 17'; Nuriyev 42'; Akhmedzade 51'; Volkovi 57'	Report	A.Samadov (yellow card) 38'	Stadium: Zira Olympic Sport Complex Stadium; Attendance: 500; Referee: Rauf Cabarov

4 October 2024 9	Kapaz	4–3	Neftçi	Tovuz
17:00 AZT (UTC+4)	Aliyev 24', 32'; Ba 41'; Braga 48'; A.Samadov (yellow card) 89'; Rogerio (yellow card) 90+3'	Report	Koffi 4'; Sheydayev 31'; Matias (yellow card) 38'; Salyanski 90+5'	Stadium: City Stadium; Attendance: 500; Referee: Rəşad Əhmədov

18 October 2024 10	Kapaz	0–5	Qarabağ	Tovuz
18:00 AZT (UTC+4)		Report	Addai 17'; Romão (yellow card) 20'; Isayev 51'; L.Andrade 52'; Bayramov 67'; Kashchuk 78'	Stadium: City Stadium; Attendance: 1,500; Referee: Rəvan Həmzəzadə

25 October 2024 11	Turan Tovuz	2–1	Kapaz	Tovuz
19:00 AZT (UTC+4)	Rzayev 15' (yellow card) 44'; Shafiyev (yellow card) 19'; Christian (yellow card) 55'; Hajiyev (yellow card) 63'; Souza (yellow card) 67'; Hackman 90+4'	Report	Pachu (yellow card) 2' (goal) 76' (pen.); Suleymanov (yellow card) 30'; O.Aliyev (yellow card) 53'; Hüseynli (yellow card) 90+3'; Verdasca (yellow card) 90+5' (yellow-red card) 90+5'	Stadium: City Stadium; Attendance: 3,800; Referee: Rauf Allahverdiyev

3 November 2024 12	Kapaz	1–0	Sabail	Tovuz
16:00 AZT (UTC+4)	Hüseynli (yellow card) 67'; A.Samadov (yellow card) 88'; Jafarov 90+5'; Qırtımov (yellow card) 90+5'; Paná (yellow card) 90+5'	Report		Stadium: City Stadium; Attendance: 400; Referee: Kamal Umudlu

9 November 2024 13	Sabah	2–2	Kapaz	Masazir
19:30 AZT (UTC+4)	Aliyev 32' (o.g.); Parris 73'; Nogueira (yellow card) 90+3'	Report	Aliyev 4'; Suleymanov 89'; Pachu (yellow card) 90+3'	Stadium: Bank Respublika Arena; Attendance: 1,100; Referee: Əliyar Ağayev

22 November 2024 14	Kapaz	0–2	Araz-Naxçıvan	Tovuz
17:00 AZT (UTC+4)	Ba (yellow card) 43'	Report	Santos 25'; Ribeiro (yellow card) 74'; Benny 85'; Alxasov (yellow card) 88'	Stadium: City Stadium; Attendance: 650; Referee: Elçin Məsiyev

30 November 2024 15	Shamakhi	0–1	Kapaz	Shamakhi
14:30 AZT (UTC+4)	Kantaria (yellow card) 90+1'	Report	Pachu (penalty missed) 60' 69'; Verdasca (yellow card) 64'; Hüseynli (yellow card) 67'; Khvalko (yellow card) 90+1'; Rogerio (yellow card) 90+5'	Stadium: City Stadium; Attendance: 600; Referee: İnqilab Məmmədov

8 December 2024 16	Kapaz	0–4	Zira	Tovuz
16:00 AZT (UTC+4)	Aliyev (yellow card) 40'	Report	Soumah 32'; Papunashvili 45+2'; Djibrilla 47'; Alijanov 73'	Stadium: City Stadium; Attendance: 150; Referee: Tural Qurbanov

15 December 2024 17	Neftçi	2–1	Kapaz	Baku
18:30 AZT (UTC+4)	Bogomolsky 4'; Ozobić 22'; Haghverdi (yellow card) 36'; Kuč (yellow card) 53'	Report	Paná (yellow card) 42'; Aliyev (yellow card) 69' (goal) 77'	Stadium: Neftçi Arena; Attendance: 700; Referee: Cavid Cəlilov

20 December 2024 18	Kapaz	0–0	Sumgayit	Tovuz
16:00 AZT (UTC+4)		Report	Badalov (yellow card) 34'; Dzhenetov (yellow card) 90+1'	Stadium: City Stadium; Attendance: 150; Referee: Kamal Umudlu

19 January 2025 19	Kapaz	5–2	Turan Tovuz	Tovuz
16:00 AZT (UTC+4)	Manafov 17', 56'; Khvalko 42'; Pachu (penalty missed) 55'; Rogério (yellow card) 60'; Ba 75'; L'Koucha 90+2'	Report	Christian 5'; O.Aliyev (yellow card) 33'; Sadykhov 35'; Ghaderi (yellow card) 60'; Ahmadov (yellow card) 60'; Yusifli (yellow card) 60'; Zulfugarli (yellow card) 90+7'	Stadium: City Stadium; Attendance: 4,300; Referee: Rəvan Həmzəzadə

25 January 2025 20	Sabail	1–0	Kapaz	Baku
16:00 AZT (UTC+4)	Queta 11'; Lytvyn (yellow card) 80'; Çelik (yellow card) 83'	Report	Paná (yellow card) 46'; Verdasca (yellow card) 55'	Stadium: Bayil Arena; Attendance: 1,050; Referee: Əliyar Ağayev

31 January 2025 21	Kapaz	3–2	Sabah	Tovuz
16:00 AZT (UTC+4)	Ba 11'; A.Samadov 54'; Hüseynli 64' (pen.) (yellow card) 74'	Report	Šafranko 6'; Nogueira (yellow card) 14' (yellow-red card) 63'; Sekidika 45+4'; Dashdamirov (yellow card) 66'	Stadium: City Stadium; Attendance: 300; Referee: Fərid Hacıyev

10 February 2025 22	Araz-Naxçıvan	0–0	Kapaz	Baku
16:00 AZT (UTC+4)	Qarayev (yellow card) 53'; Ahmadzada (yellow card) 77'	Report	A.Samadov (yellow card) 58'; Verdasca (yellow card) 68'; Ardazishvili (yellow card) 74'	Stadium: Dalga Arena; Attendance: 200; Referee: Kamal Umudlu

17 February 2025 23	Kapaz	1–1	Shamakhi	Tovuz
16:00 AZT (UTC+4)	Veremyeyev 55' (o.g.)	Report	Konaté (yellow card) 35' (goal) 49' (pen.)	Stadium: City Stadium; Attendance: 400; Referee: Elçin Məsiyev

24 February 2025 24	Zira	2–0	Kapaz	Zirə
17:00 AZT (UTC+4)	Utzig 62' (yellow card) 90'; Alıyev (yellow card) 87'; Akhmedzade 90+3'	Report	Manafov (yellow card) 39'; Hüseynli (yellow card) 85'	Stadium: Zira Olympic Sport Complex Stadium; Attendance: 100; Referee: Rauf Cabarov
Note: Match postponed on 23 February due to adverse weather conditions.

5 February 2025 25	Kapaz	1–0	Neftçi	Tovuz
17:00 AZT (UTC+4)	Mabatshoev 50'	Report	Matias (yellow card) 19'; Ozobić (yellow card) 65'; Mahmudov (yellow card) 72'	Stadium: City Stadium; Attendance: 750; Referee: Cavid Cəlilov

10 March 2025 26	Sumgayit	3–0	Kapaz	Sumgait
17:00 AZT (UTC+4)	Kahat 20', 51'; Milović (yellow card) 78'; Mossi (yellow card) 85'; Ahmedzade 90+3'	Report	Verdasca (yellow card) 45+1'; Manafov (yellow card) 66'; Hüseynli (yellow card) 69'; Şahverdiyev (yellow card) 90+1'	Stadium: City Stadium; Attendance: 800; Referee: İnqilab Məmmədov

15 March 2025 27	Kapaz	0–0	Qarabağ	Tovuz
17:00 AZT (UTC+4)	Buhagiar (yellow card) 83'; Jafarov (yellow card) 90+2'	Report	P.Andrade (yellow card) 48'	Stadium: City Stadium; Attendance: 1,500; Referee: Fərid Hacıyev

30 March 2025 28	Kapaz	1–1	Sabail	Tovuz
16:00 AZT (UTC+4)	Mabatshoyev 41'; Verdasca (yellow card) 61'	Report	Sofir (yellow card) 16'; Lytvyn 68'; Ahmadov (yellow card) 76'	Stadium: City Stadium; Attendance: 450; Referee: Rəvan Həmzəzadə

6 April 2025 29	Sabah	0–1	Kapaz	Masazir
17:00 AZT (UTC+4)	Lepinjica (yellow card) 30'	Report	Paná 41'; Hüseynli (yellow card) 53'; Manafov (yellow card) 81'; A.Samadov (yellow card) 90+3'	Stadium: Bank Respublika Arena; Attendance: 1,149; Referee: Rauf Cabarov

13 April 2025 30	Kapaz	0–0	Araz-Naxçıvan	Tovuz
17:00 AZT (UTC+4)	Taghiyev (yellow card) 46'	Report	Ribeiro (yellow card) 50'	Stadium: City Stadium; Attendance: 350; Referee: Kamal Umudlu

20 April 2025 31	Shamakhi	2–1	Kapaz	Shamakhi
16:30 AZT (UTC+4)	Msanga 27'; Konaté (yellow card) 41' (goal) 67'; Thuíque (yellow card) 45+1' (yellow-red card) 85'; Rustamli (yellow card) 58'	Report	Pachu 35'; Verdasca (yellow card) 58'	Stadium: City Stadium; Attendance: 1,200; Referee: Cavid Cəlilov

26 April 2025 32	Kapaz	0–1	Zira	Tovuz
19:00 AZT (UTC+4)	Taghiyev (yellow card) 90+4'; Verdasca (yellow card) 90+5'	Report	Soumah 64'; İbrahimli (yellow card) 83'; Bayramov (yellow card) 90+5'	Stadium: City Stadium; Attendance: 500; Referee: Əliyar Ağayev

4 May 2025 33	Neftçi	2–2	Kapaz	Baku
20:00 AZT (UTC+4)	Fernandes 24'; Camalov (yellow card) 36' (red card) 70'; Mahmudov 90+3' (pen.)	Report	Pachu 50' (yellow card) 89'; Jafarov 63'	Stadium: Neftçi Arena; Attendance: 850; Referee: Rauf Cabarov

11 May 2025 34	Kapaz	1–0	Sumgayit	Tovuz
18:00 AZT (UTC+4)	Hüseynli 11' (pen.); Ba (yellow card) 22'; U.Samadov (yellow card) 78'; A.Samadov (yellow card) 89'; Khvalko (yellow card) 89'; Ardazishvili (yellow card) 89'; Rogerio (yellow card) 90+5'	Report	Dias (yellow card) 29'; Kharaishvili (yellow card) 87'; Mustafayev (red card) 89'; Azizli (red card) 89'	Stadium: City Stadium; Attendance: 400; Referee: İnqilab Məmmədov

18 May 2025 35	Qarabağ	3–0	Kapaz	Baku
19:00 AZT (UTC+4)	L.Andrade 31'; Qurbanlı (yellow card) 51' (goal) 81'; P.Andrade (yellow card) 59'; Kashchuk 75'	Report	A.Samadov (yellow card) 12'; Verdasca (yellow card) 34'; Pachu (yellow card) 50'	Stadium: Azersun Arena; Attendance: 3,500; Referee: Rəvan Həmzəzadə

25 May 2025 36	Turan Tovuz	4–0	Kapaz	Tovuz
17:00 AZT (UTC+4)	Souza 10', 23'; Manafov 42' (o.g.); Guseynov 44'	Report	Verdasca (yellow card) 6'; Paná (yellow card) 38'; Məmmədov (yellow card) 90+2'	Stadium: City Stadium; Attendance: 4,000; Referee: Fərid Hacıyev

=== Azerbaijan Cup ===
29 October 2024 Second round	Ağdaş	0–6	Kapaz	Tovuz
16:00 AZT (UTC+4)	Süleymanov (yellow card) 20'; Sarıyev (yellow card) 52'	Report	N'Diaye 10'; L'Koucha 17', 42'; Rzayev 21', 61'; Mammadov 68'	Stadium: City Stadium; Attendance: 500; Referee: İnqilab Məmmədov

4 December 2024 Round of 16	Kapaz	1–0	İmişli	Tovuz
16:00 AZT (UTC+4)	Braga (yellow card) 21'; Hüseynli (yellow card) 78'; L'Koucha 85' (pen.); Khvalko (yellow card) 86'; Jafarov (yellow card) 86'	Report	Ingilabli (yellow card) 85'; Aghazade (yellow card) 86'; Henrique (yellow card) 86'	Stadium: City Stadium; Attendance: 60; Referee: Nijat Ismayilli

5 February 2025 Quarter-final 1st leg	Kapaz	0–2	Neftçi	Tovuz
16:00 AZT (UTC+4)	Hüseynli (yellow card) 90+2'	Report	Ozobić (yellow card) 30'; Salyanski 36'; Mahmudov (yellow card) 48'; Matias 69'; Jafarov (yellow card) 90+1'	Stadium: City Stadium; Attendance: 500; Referee: İnqilab Məmmədov

28 February 2025 Quarter-final 2nd leg	Neftçi	1–0 (3–0 agg.)	Kapaz	Baku
19:30 AZT (UTC+4)	Sambou 27' (red card) 58'	Report	Qirtimov (yellow card) 30'; Shahverdiyev (yellow card) 90'	Stadium: Neftçi Arena; Attendance: 650; Referee: Rəşad Əhmədov

== Squad statistics ==
As of match played 25 May 2025

=== Appearances and goals ===
No.	Pos	Nat	Player	Total		Premier League		Azerbaijan Cup	
No.	Pos	Nat	Player	Apps	Goals	Apps	Goals	Apps	Goals
1	GK	(Portugal) POR	Rogerio	32	0	31	0	1	0
2	DF	(Azerbaijan) AZE	İlkin Qırtımov	18	0	14+3	0	1	0
3	DF	(Mali) MLI	Mahamadou Ba	27	3	25	3	2	0
5	DF	(Azerbaijan) AZE	Rauf Hüseynli	30	2	27	2	1+2	0
6	DF	(Azerbaijan) AZE	Nemat Musayev	9	0	1+7	0	0+1	0
7	MF	(Azerbaijan) AZE	Ehtiram Şahverdiyev	38	0	27+8	0	2+1	0
8	MF	(Azerbaijan) AZE	Elmir Taghiyev	15	0	9+5	0	1	0
9	FW	(Brazil) BRA	Pachu	30	4	24+3	4	1+2	0
10	FW	(Spain) ESP	Karim L'Koucha	37	4	13+20	1	3+1	3
11	FW	(Malta) MLT	Trent Buhagiar	14	0	4+8	0	2	0
12	DF	(Azerbaijan) AZE	Turan Manafov	31	2	27+1	2	3	0
15	MF	(Azerbaijan) AZE	Javad Karimov	7	0	1+6	0	0	0
17	MF	(Azerbaijan) AZE	Umid Samadov	11	0	7+2	0	2	0
19	FW	(Azerbaijan) AZE	Sadiq Shafiyev	14	0	4+8	0	1+1	0
21	MF	(Azerbaijan) AZE	Jamal Jafarov	35	2	8+23	2	1+3	0
22	GK	(Azerbaijan) AZE	Mammad Hüseynov	10	0	5+2	0	3	0
26	MF	(Angola) ANG	Paná	30	1	27+2	1	0+1	0
28	MF	(Georgia (country)) GEO	Rati Ardazishvili	20	0	17+1	0	2	0
29	DF	(Portugal) POR	Diogo Verdasca	30	0	26+1	0	3	0
44	MF	(Azerbaijan) AZE	Nihat Faraci	3	0	0+2	0	0+1	0
57	MF	(Azerbaijan) AZE	Amur Yusifov	1	0	0	0	0+1	0
70	FW	(Azerbaijan) AZE	Nicat Süleymanov	20	1	11+9	1	0	0
78	DF	(Belarus) BLR	Yegor Khvalko	36	1	32+1	1	3	0
80	FW	(Azerbaijan) AZE	Tural Rzayev	4	2	0+2	0	2	2
88	FW	(Tajikistan) TJK	Shervoni Mabatshoyev	17	2	9+6	2	2	0
91	MF	(Azerbaijan) AZE	Nihad İsaqov	1	0	0+1	0	0	0
97	FW	(Azerbaijan) AZE	Nicat Mammadov	3	1	0+1	0	0+2	1
99	MF	(Azerbaijan) AZE	Ali Samadov	27	1	11+13	1	2+1	0
Players away on loan:
20	FW	(Azerbaijan) AZE	Mahir Hasanov	4	0	0+2	0	2	0
66	DF	(Azerbaijan) AZE	Arzu Atakişiyev	4	0	0+4	0	0	0
Players who left Kapaz during the season:
11	FW	(Azerbaijan) AZE	Orkhan Aliyev	16	4	10+5	4	1	0
19	FW	(Mali) MLI	Lassana N'Diaye	15	2	7+6	1	2	1
28	FW	(Albania) ALB	Redon Mihana	4	0	2+2	0	0	0
77	FW	(Brazil) BRA	João Braga	18	2	15+2	2	1	0
88	MF	(Brazil) BRA	Keverton	2	0	2	0	0	0

=== Goal scorers ===
Place	Position	Nation	Number	Name	Premier League	Azerbaijan Cup	Total
1	FW	(Azerbaijan)	11	Orkhan Aliyev	4	0	4
1	FW	(Brazil)	9	Pachu	4	0	4
1	FW	(Spain)	10	Karim L'Koucha	1	3	4
4	DF	(Mali)	3	Mahamadou Ba	3	0	3
5	FW	(Brazil)	77	João Braga	2	0	2
5	DF	(Azerbaijan)	12	Turan Manafov	2	0	2
5	FW	(Tajikistan)	88	Shervoni Mabatshoyev	2	0	2
5	FW	(Azerbaijan)	21	Jamal Jafarov	2	0	2
5	DF	(Azerbaijan)	5	Rauf Hüseynli	2	0	2
5	FW	(Mali)	19	Lassana N'Diaye	1	1	2
5	FW	(Azerbaijan)	80	Tural Rzayev	0	2	2
12	MF	(Azerbaijan)	70	Nicat Süleymanov	1	0	1
12	DF	(Belarus)	78	Yegor Khvalko	1	0	1
12	MF	(Azerbaijan)	99	Ali Samadov	1	0	1
12	MF	(Angola)	26	Paná	1	0	1
12	FW	(Azerbaijan)	97	Nicat Mammadov	0	1	1
12				Own goal	1	0	1
				TOTALS	28	7	35

=== Clean sheets ===
Place	Position	Nation	Number	Name	Premier League	Azerbaijan Cup	Total
1	GK	(Portugal)	1	Rogerio	8	0	8
2	GK	(Azerbaijan)	22	Mammad Hüseynov	1	2	3
				TOTALS	9	2	11

=== Disciplinary record ===
Number	Nation	Position	Name	Premier League		Azerbaijan Cup		Total	
Number	Nation	Position	Name	Booked	Sent off (straight red)	Booked	Sent off (straight red)	Booked	Sent off (straight red)
1	(Portugal)	GK	Rogerio	4	0	0	0	4	0
2	(Azerbaijan)	DF	İlkin Qırtımov	2	0	1	0	3	0
3	(Mali)	DF	Mahamadou Ba	2	0	0	0	2	0
5	(Azerbaijan)	DF	Rauf Hüseynli	7	0	2	0	9	0
6	(Azerbaijan)	DF	Nemat Musayev	1	0	0	0	1	0
7	(Azerbaijan)	MF	Ehtiram Şahverdiyev	3	0	1	0	4	0
8	(Azerbaijan)	MF	Elmir Taghiyev	7	1	0	0	7	1
9	(Brazil)	FW	Pachu	5	0	0	0	5	0
11	(Malta)	FW	Trent Buhagiar	1	0	0	0	1	0
12	(Azerbaijan)	DF	Turan Manafov	3	0	0	0	3	0
17	(Azerbaijan)	MF	Umid Samadov	3	0	0	0	3	0
21	(Azerbaijan)	FW	Jamal Jafarov	1	0	1	0	2	0
26	(Angola)	MF	Paná	3	0	0	0	3	0
28	(Georgia (country))	MF	Rati Ardazishvili	2	0	0	0	2	0
29	(Portugal)	DF	Diogo Verdasca	11	1	0	0	11	1
66	(Azerbaijan)	DF	Arzu Atakişiyev	2	0	0	0	2	0
70	(Azerbaijan)	FW	Nijat Suleymanov	1	0	0	0	1	0
78	(Belarus)	DF	Yegor Khvalko	4	0	1	0	5	0
97	(Azerbaijan)	FW	Nicat Mammadov	1	0	0	0	1	0
99	(Azerbaijan)	MF	Ali Samadov	8	0	0	0	8	0
Players away on loan:
Players who left Kapaz during the season:
11	(Azerbaijan)	FW	Orkhan Aliyev	4	0	0	0	4	0
77	(Brazil)	FW	João Braga	1	0	1	0	2	0
88	(Brazil)	MF	Keverton	1	0	0	0	1	0
			TOTALS	77	2	7	0	84	2
