= İlkin Muradov =

Azerbaijani footballer (born 1996)

Personal information
- Full name: İlkin Ədalət oğlu Muradov
- Date of birth: 5 March 1996 (age 30)
- Place of birth: Azerbaijan
- Height: 1.74 m (5 ft 9 in)
- Position: Midfielder

Team information
- Current team: Abdysh-Ata

Senior career*
Years	Team	Apps	(Gls)
2017–2024	Zira	134	(3)
2023	→ Sabail (loan)	13	(0)
2024	Shamakhi	12	(0)
2025	Sabail	17	(0)
2025–	Abdysh-Ata	0	(0)

International career^{‡}
2017–2018	Azerbaijan U21	4	(0)
- * Club domestic league appearances and goals as of 20 July 2025 ‡ National team caps and goals as of 18 November 2021

İlkin Ədalət oğlu Muradov (born 5 March 1996) is an Azerbaijani professional footballer who plays as a midfielder for Abdysh-Ata in the Kyrgyz Premier League.

== Club career ==
On 29 April 2017, Muradov made his debut in the Azerbaijan Premier League for Zira's match against Shuvalan.

On 15 February 2023, Muradov joined Sabail on loan for the remainder of the season.

== Career statistics ==
=== Club ===
As of match played 22 April 2023

Appearances and goals by club, season and competition
Club	Season	League			National cup (Note: Includes Azerbaijan Cup)		Continental		Other		Total	
Club	Season	Division	Apps	Goals	Apps	Goals	Apps	Goals	Apps	Goals	Apps	Goals
Zira	2015–16	Azerbaijan Premier League	0	0	0	0	—				0	0
Zira	2016–17	Azerbaijan Premier League	1	0	0	0	—				1	0
Zira	2017–18	Azerbaijan Premier League	17	0	3	0	0	0	—		20	0
Zira	2018–19	Azerbaijan Premier League	23	0	4	1	—				27	1
Zira	2019–20	Azerbaijan Premier League	15	2	2	0	—				17	2
Zira	2020–21	Azerbaijan Premier League	27	0	5	1	—				32	1
Zira	2021–22	Azerbaijan Premier League	19	0	4	0	—				23	0
Zira	2022–23	Azerbaijan Premier League	13	0	3	0	2	0	—		18	0
Zira	Total		115	2	21	2	2	0	-	-	138	4
Sabail (loan)	2022–23	Azerbaijan Premier League	8	0	1	1	—				9	1
Career total			123	2	22	3	2	0	-	-	147	5
