= Mahamadou Ba =

Malian footballer

Personal information
- Date of birth: 21 September 1999 (age 27)
- Place of birth: Bamako, Mali
- Height: 1.75 m (5 ft 9 in)
- Position: Midfielder

Team information
- Current team: Kapaz PFK
- Number: 12

Youth career
- 2018–2019: BB Erzurumspor

Senior career*
Years	Team	Apps	(Gls)
2019–2021	BB Erzurumspor	3	(0)
2020	→ Bandırmaspor (loan)	6	(0)
2021–2022	Menemenspor	24	(2)
2022–2024	Adana Demirspor	0	(0)
2023	→ İstanbulspor (loan)	15	(1)
2023–2024	→ Tuzlaspor (loan)	28	(0)
2024–	Kapaz	50	(3)
- * Club domestic league appearances and goals as of 22 June 2026

Mahamadou Ba (born 21 September 1999) is a Malian professional footballer who plays as a midfielder for Azerbaijani club Kapaz.

== Career ==
Ba left his home country of Mali to join BB Erzurumspor in the summer of 2018. In September 2019, he made his debut in the Turkish Cup, playing in a 4–3 win over Edirnespor. Ba made his Süper Lig debut a year later, coming on as a late substitute in a 2–1 victory against Ankaragücü. In October 2020, he joined TFF First League side Bandırmaspor on loan until the end of the season. However, the loan was cut short and he joined Menemenspor on a permanent deal in February 2021.

On 12 January 2023, Ba joined İstanbulspor on loan until the end of the 2022–23 season.

On October 2, 2024, Azerbaijan Premier League club Kapaz signed a contract with Ba until the end of the season.

== Career statistics ==
As of 18 November 2020

Appearances and goals by club, season and competition
Club	Season	League			Cup		League Cup		Other		Total	
Club	Season	Division	Apps	Goals	Apps	Goals	Apps	Goals	Apps	Goals	Apps	Goals
BB Erzurumspor	2019–20	TFF First League	2	0	8	0	0	0	0	0	10	0
BB Erzurumspor	2020–21	Süper Lig	1	0	0	0	0	0	0	0	1	0
Bandırmaspor	2020–21	TFF First League	2	0	1	0	0	0	0	0	3	0
Career total			5	0	9	0	0	0	0	0	14	0
