= Umid Samadov =

Azerbaijani footballer (born 2003)

Personal information
- Full name: Umid Samadov
- Date of birth: 7 October 2003 (age 23)
- Place of birth: Azerbaijan
- Height: 1.77 m (5 ft 10 in)
- Position: Midfielder

Team information
- Current team: Kapaz
- Number: 17

Senior career*
Years	Team	Apps	(Gls)
2022–	Kapaz	35	(0)
- * Club domestic league appearances and goals as of 22 June 2026

Umid Samadov (Azerbaijani: Ümid Səmədov; born 7 October 2003) is an Azerbaijani footballer who plays as a midfielder for Kapaz in the Azerbaijan Premier League.

== Club career ==
On 1 September 2022, Samadov made his debut in the Azerbaijan Premier League for Kapaz match against Qarabağ.
