= Tural Rzayev =

Azerbaijani footballer (born 1993)

Personal information
- Full name: Tural Elkhan oglu Rzayev
- Date of birth: 26 August 1993 (age 33)
- Place of birth: Azerbaijan
- Height: 1.73 m (5 ft 8 in)
- Position: Winger

Team information
- Current team: Gancabasar PFK
- Number: 80

Senior career*
Years	Team	Apps	(Gls)
2013–2014	Ağsu		
2015–2018	Kapaz	71	(1)
2018	Jonava	7	(0)
2015–2018	Kapaz	9	(0)
2020	Merani		
2021–2025	Kapaz	51	(0)
2025–	Gancabasar PFK	0	(0)
- * Club domestic league appearances and goals as of 9 April 2025

Tural Rzayev (Azerbaijani: Tural Rzayev; born 26 August 1993) is an Azerbaijani footballer who plays as a midfielder for Shaki PFK.

== Club career ==
On 9 August 2015, Rzayev made his debut in the Azerbaijan Premier League for Kapaz match against Neftçi.
