= Toni Gomes =

Bissau-Guinean footballer (born 1998)

Personal information
- Full name: Toni Correia Gomes
- Date of birth: 16 November 1998 (age 27)
- Place of birth: Bissau, Guinea-Bissau
- Height: 1.80 m (5 ft 11 in)
- Position: Forward

Team information
- Current team: Prishtina e Re
- Number: 10

Youth career
- 2015–2017: Liverpool

Senior career*
Years	Team	Apps	(Gls)
2017–2018	Liverpool	0	(0)
2017–2018	→ Forest Green Rovers (loan)	9	(0)
2018–2019	Arouca	9	(2)
2020	Haras El Hodoud	17	(3)
2020–2021	Tala'ea El Gaish	3	(0)
2021–2022	Menemenspor	29	(3)
2022	Tuzlaspor	0	(0)
2022–2023	Zira	25	(3)
2023–2024	Hapoel Hadera	14	(1)
2024	Seongnam	12	(0)
2025–	Prishtina e Re	29	(5)

International career^{‡}
2015	Portugal U17	3	(0)
2016	Portugal U18	3	(0)
2022–2023	Guinea-Bissau	4	(0)
- * Club domestic league appearances and goals as of 22 June 2026 ‡ National team caps and goals as of 18 August 2025

Toni Correia Gomes (born 16 November 1998) is a Bissau-Guinean professional footballer who plays as a forward for Kosovar club Prishtina e Re and the Guinea-Bissau national team. He also holds Portuguese citizenship and has represented Portugal at youth level.

== Club career ==
Gomes visited his father in Lisbon, Portugal aged 15 and after a recommendation from a scout, Liverpool invited him to England for a trial in September 2014. He signed for the club in 2015; when he arrived in Liverpool he did not speak any English and was placed with house parents whilst attending Liverpool's academy.

Between 2015 and 2017 he appeared for Liverpool's Under-18 team, as well as the Under-23 teams. He ended the 2016–17 season scoring a hat-trick as Liverpool Under-23s beat Mansfield Town's Under-23 team.

On 31 August 2017 he joined Forest Green Rovers on a season-long loan, and made his Football League debut as a substitute on 2 September, playing the entire second half.

Gomes was released by Liverpool at the end of the 2017–18 season.

On 4 June 2018, Gomes signed a three-year deal with LigaPro side Arouca.

In January 2020, he moved to Egypt to join Haras El Hodoud, he later signed for Tala'ea El Gaish in November 2020.

On 24 August 2023 signed for Israeli Premier League club Hapoel Hadera.

After playing for South Korean club Seongnam, he moved to newly promoted Kosovo Superleague club Prishtina e Re in July 2025.

== International career ==
Gomes has represented Portugal at youth international level. He made his senior debut for Guinea-Bissau on 17 November 2022 in a 1-3 friendly loss to Gabon.

== Career statistics ==
As of 24 September 2018

Appearances and goals by club, season and competition
Club	Season	League			FA Cup		League Cup		Other		Total	
Club	Season	Division	Apps	Goals	Apps	Goals	Apps	Goals	Apps	Goals	Apps	Goals
Liverpool	2017–18	Premier League	0	0	0	0	0	0	0	0	0	0
Forest Green Rovers (loan)	2017–18	League Two	9	0	2	0	0	0	2 (Note: Appearances in the EFL Trophy.)	0	13	0
Arouca	2018–19	LigaPro	3	1	2	0	0	0	0	0	5	1
Career total			12	1	4	0	0	0	2	0	18	1
