= Sertan Taşqın =

Azerbaijani footballer (born 1997)

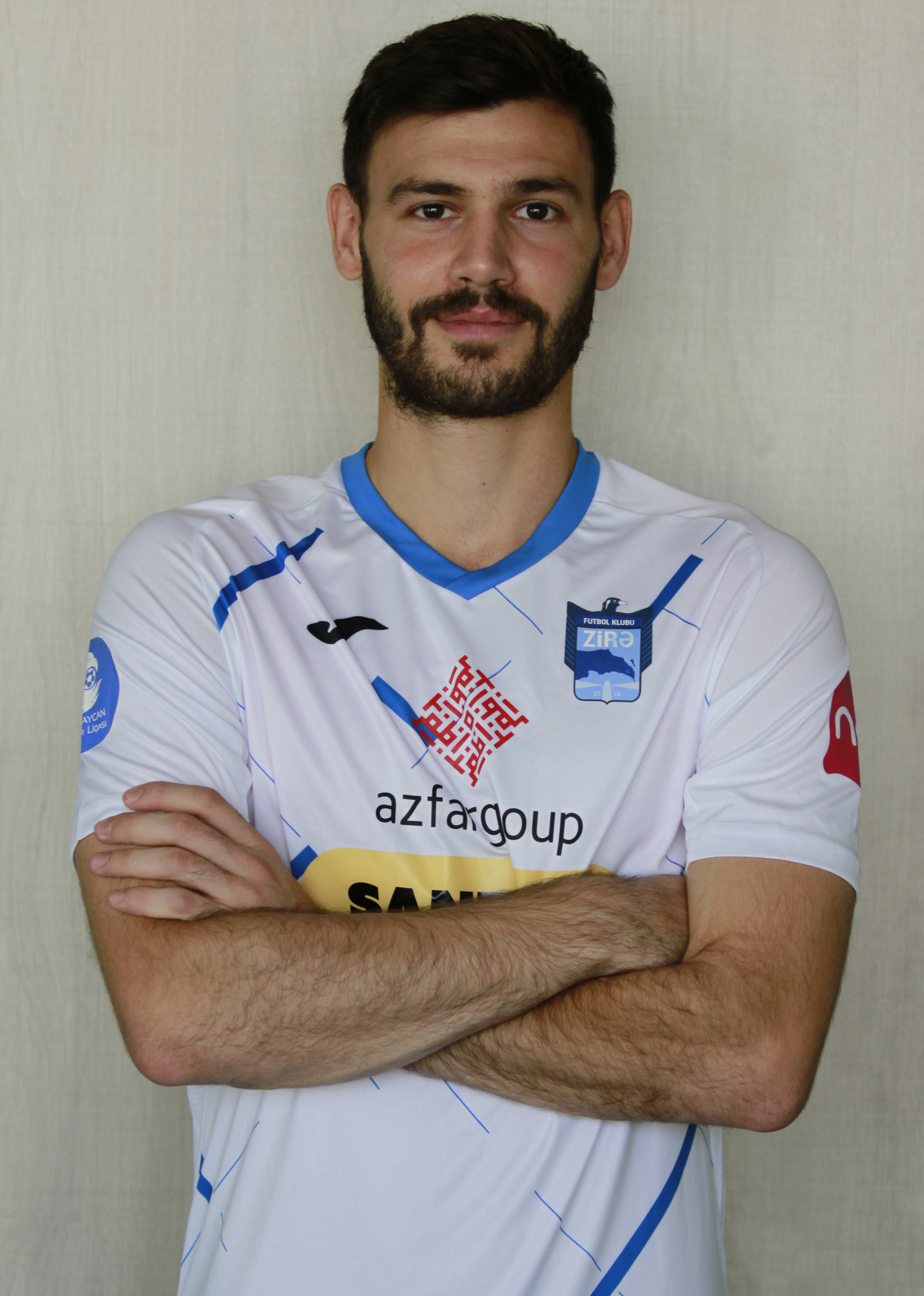

Personal information
- Full name: Sertan Selattin oglu Taşqın
- Date of birth: 8 October 1997 (age 29)
- Place of birth: Baku, Azerbaijan
- Height: 1.83 m (6 ft 0 in)
- Position: Right-back

Team information
- Current team: Sabail
- Number: 3

Senior career*
Years	Team	Apps	(Gls)
2015–2019	Keşla	55	(4)
2019–2020	Sumgayit	18	(1)
2020–2023	Zira	74	(5)
2023–2024	Turan Tovuz	16	(1)
2024	Manisa	15	(0)
2024–2025	Sumgayit	30	(1)
2025–2026	Serikspor	22	(0)
2026–	Sabail	0	(0)

International career^{‡}
2015	Azerbaijan U19	3	(0)
2016–2018	Azerbaijan U21	12	(0)
2021–	Azerbaijan	2	(0)
- * Club domestic league appearances and goals as of 27 October 2026 ‡ National team caps and goals as of 4 May 2023

Sertan Taşqın, born on 8 October 1997) is an Azerbaijani professional footballer who plays as a defender for Sabail.

== Club career ==
Taşqın made his debut in the Azerbaijan Premier League for Keşla on 28 May 2015 against Sumgayit.

On 18 July 2020, Taşqın signed a two-year contract with Zira FK.

On 21 June 2023, Taşqın joined Turan Tovuz from Zira.

On 11 January 2024, Turan Tovuz announced that Taşqın had left the club by mutual consent to allow him to join TFF First League club Manisa.

On 20 July 2025, Taşqın signed one-year contract with TFF First League club Serik Belediyespor.

== International career ==
He represented Azerbaijani youth teams. He represented the senior Azerbaijan national team in a friendly 1–1 draw with Qatar on 27 March 2021.

== Honours ==
Keşla

- Azerbaijan Cup (1): 2017–18
