= Yegor Khvalko =

Belarusian footballer (born 1997)

Personal information
- Date of birth: 18 February 1997 (age 29)
- Place of birth: Baranovichi, Brest Oblast, Belarus
- Height: 1.81 m (5 ft 11 1/2 in)
- Position: Defender

Team information
- Current team: Atyrau
- Number: 78

Youth career
- 2014–2016: Neman Grodno

Senior career*
Years	Team	Apps	(Gls)
2016–2020	Neman Grodno	38	(0)
2016	→ Lida (loan)	11	(0)
2019	→ Dnyapro Mogilev (loan)	14	(0)
2021–2022	Arsenal Dzerzhinsk	40	(6)
2022–25	Kapaz	95	(3)
2025	Tobol	8	(0)
2026–	Atyrau	25	(2)

International career^{‡}
2015	Belarus U19		
2017–2018	Belarus U21	8	(0)
2017	Belarus B	1	(0)
2025–	Belarus	1	(0)
- * Club domestic league appearances and goals as of 1 November 2026 ‡ National team caps and goals as of 19 November 2025

Yegor Khvalko (Belarusian: Ягор Хвалько; Russian: Егор Хвалько; born 18 February 1997) is a Belarusian professional footballer who plays for Kazakhstan Premier League club Atyrau and the Belarus national team. He has also appeared for Belarus U19 and U21 teams.
