= Petro Stasyuk =

Ukrainian footballer (born 1995)

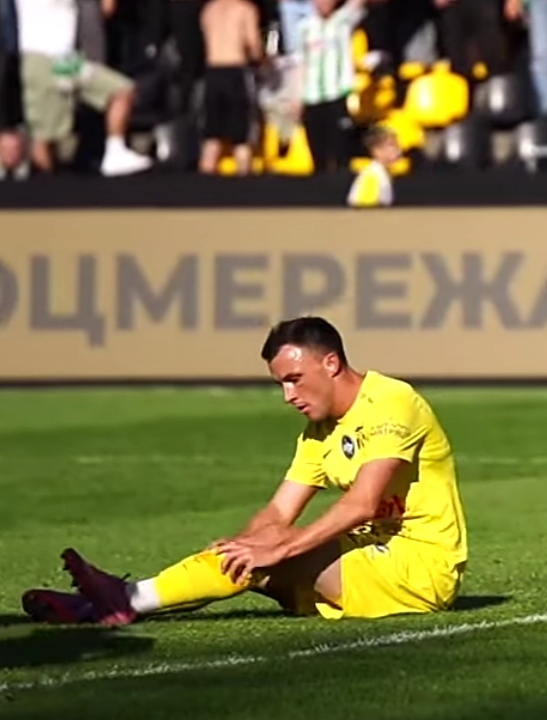

Personal information
- Full name: Petro Mykolayovych Stasyuk
- Date of birth: 24 February 1995 (age 31)
- Place of birth: Petrodolynske, Odesa Oblast, Ukraine
- Height: 1.80 m (5 ft 11 in)
- Position: Defender

Team information
- Current team: Bukovyna Chernivtsi
- Number: 95

Youth career
- 2008–2010: Monolit Illichivsk
- 2010: Youth Sportive School #11 Odesa
- 2010–2012: Skala Morshyn

Senior career*
Years	Team	Apps	(Gls)
2012–2017	Skala Stryi	109	(0)
2017–2018	Balkany Zorya	21	(1)
2018	Zhemchuzhyna Odesa	8	(0)
2018–2020	Mynai	57	(2)
2020–2022	Mariupol	42	(1)
2022–2023	Sabail	34	(0)
2023–2025	LNZ Cherkasy	23	(0)
2024–2025	→ Obolon Kyiv (loan)	23	(1)
2025–	Bukovyna Chernivtsi	28	(1)
- * Club domestic league appearances and goals as of 3 June 2026

Petro Mykolayovych Stasyuk (Ukrainian: Петро Миколайович Стасюк; born 24 February 1995) is a Ukrainian professional footballer who plays as a defender for Bukovyna Chernivtsi.

== Career ==
Born in Ovidiopol Raion, Stasyuk is a product of the local Odesa Oblast academies as well as the Skala Morshyn youth system.

Playing for FC Mynai, Stasyuk was recognized by the PFL as a player of the month for July 2020.

After playing for various Ukrainian Second League and Ukrainian First League teams, he signed a three-year deal with the Ukrainian Premier League FC Mariupol in August 2020.
