= Goba Zakpa =

Ivorian footballer

Personal information
- Full name: Elysée Goba Zakpa
- Date of birth: 17 August 1992 (age 34)
- Place of birth: Abidjan, Ivory Coast
- Height: 1.85 m (6 ft 1 in)
- Position: Forward

Team information
- Current team: Mafra
- Number: 11

Youth career
- –2011: Rio Ave

Senior career*
Years	Team	Apps	(Gls)
2011–2012	Rio Ave	0	(0)
2011–2012	→ Gondomar (loan)	23	(4)
2012–2014	Épinal	15	(2)
2013–2014	→ SC Valenciano (loan)	28	(9)
2014–2015	Santa Maria	30	(8)
2015–2016	Gil Vicente	26	(4)
2016–2018	Felgueiras	55	(28)
2018–2020	Lusitânia	49	(20)
2020–2022	Ethnikos Achna	62	(8)
2022–2023	Sabail	30	(5)
2023–2024	Gostivari	9	(1)
2024–2025	Lusitânia	43	(10)
2025–	Mafra	8	(0)
- * Club domestic league appearances and goals as of 7 May 2026

Elysée Goba Zakpa (born 17 August 1992) is an Ivorian professional footballer who plays as a forward for Portuguese Liga 3 club Mafra.

== Career ==
On 24 January 2024, Zakpa left Macedonian First Football League side Gostivari and returned to Portugal, joining his former club Lusitânia, competing in Liga 3.
