= Ali Samadov =

Azerbaijani Businessman (born 2000)

Personal information
- Full name: Ali Samadov
- Date of birth: 6 September 2000 (age 26)
- Place of birth: Azerbaijan
- Height: 1.77 m (5 ft 10 in)
- Position: Midfielder

Team information
- Current team: Kapaz
- Number: 99

Senior career*
Years	Team	Apps	(Gls)
2016–2018	Kapaz	2	(0)
2019	Sabah	0	(0)
2020–2022	Kapaz	7	(0)
2023	Shamakhi	14	(0)
2023–	Kapaz	68	(1)

International career^{‡}
2015	Azerbaijan U19	3	(0)
- * Club domestic league appearances and goals as of 22 June 2026 ‡ National team caps and goals as of 1 October 2022

Ali Samadov (Azerbaijani: Əli Səmədov; born 6 September 1997) is an Azerbaijani footballer who plays as a midfielder for Kapaz in the Azerbaijan Premier League.

== Club career ==
On 13 March 2016, Samadov made his debut in the Azerbaijan Premier League for Kapaz match against Khazar Lankaran.
