= Ramin Ahmedov =

Azerbaijani footballer (born 2001)

Personal information
- Full name: Ramin Ramiz oglu Ahmedov
- Date of birth: 1 June 2001 (age 25)
- Place of birth: Azerbaijan
- Height: 1.79 m (5 ft 10 in)
- Position: Midfielder

Team information
- Current team: Alay

Youth career
- Zagatala

Senior career*
Years	Team	Apps	(Gls)
2021–2023	Zira	16	(1)
2023–2024	Shamakhi	16	(0)
2025–	Alay	12	(3)

International career^{‡}
2021	Azerbaijan U21	1	(0)
- * Club domestic league appearances and goals as of 24 January 2025 ‡ National team caps and goals as of 3 October 2022

Ramin Ahmedov (Azerbaijani: Ramin Əhmədov; born 1 June 2001) is an Azerbaijani footballer who plays for Kyrgyz Premier League club Alay.

== Club career ==
On 15 August 2021, Ahmedov made his debut in the Azerbaijan Premier League for Zira in a 1–1 draw against Qarabağ.

On 8 February 2023, Ahmedov left Zira to sign for Shamakhi. On 24 December 2024, Shamakhi did not extend its contract with Ahmadov, leading to his departure.

On 22 January 2025, Kyrgyz Premier League club Alay announced Ahmedov's signing for a one-year contract.
