= David Gomis =

Footballer (born 1992)

Personal information
- Full name: David Cafimipon Gomis
- Date of birth: 21 December 1992 (age 33)
- Place of birth: Toulon, France
- Height: 1.73 m (5 ft 8 in)
- Position: Forward

Team information
- Current team: Toulon
- Number: 22

Senior career*
Years	Team	Apps	(Gls)
2011	Toulon	2	(0)
2011–2013	Fréjus Saint-Raphaël	18	(3)
2013–2014	Toulon-Le Las	21	(9)
2014–2017	Toulon	73	(20)
2017–2019	Gazélec Ajaccio	66	(7)
2019	Clermont II	47	(2)
2019–2021	Clermont	47	(2)
2021–2022	Pau	43	(3)
2023–2025	Sabail	56	(6)
2025–2026	Châteauroux	1	(0)
2026–	Toulon	2	(0)

International career^{‡}
2021–	Guinea-Bissau	2	(0)
- * Club domestic league appearances and goals as of 7 February 2026 ‡ National team caps and goals as of 15 January 2023

David Cafimipon Gomis (born 21 December 1992) is a professional footballer who plays as a forward for Championnat National 1 club Toulon. Born in France, he plays for the Guinea-Bissau national team.

== Club career ==
Gomis signed with Gazélec Ajaccio on 20 July 2017 after successful seasons with Toulon in the lower divisions of France. He made his professional debut with Gazélec Ajaccio in a 1–1 Ligue 2 tie against Valenciennes on 28 July 2017.

== International career ==
Born in France, Gomis is of Senegalese and Bissau-Guinean descent. Gomis was called up by Guinea-Bissau in late May 2021. He debuted with the Guinea-Bissau national team in a 4–2 2022 FIFA World Cup qualification win over Sudan on 7 September 2021.
