= 2021–22 in Ukrainian football =

Football in Ukraine
- Season: 2021–22

Men's football
- Premier League: no title awarded
- First League: no title awarded
- Second League: no title awarded
- Cup: no title awarded
- Amateur Cup: no title awarded
- Super Cup: Shakhtar Donetsk

Women's football
- Vyshcha Liha: no title awarded
- Persha Liha: no title awarded
- Women's Cup: Vorskla Poltava

The 2021–22 season was the 31st season of competitive association football in Ukraine since dissolution of the Soviet Union.

The Ukrainian Premier League and other sporting competitions were abandoned on 26 February 2022 following the Russian invasion of Ukraine and declaration of martial law in the country.

== National teams ==
=== Ukraine national football team ===
==== Friendlies ====
8 September 2021 Friendly	Czech Republic	1–1	Ukraine	Plzeň, Czech Republic
20:45 UTC+2	Vydra 90+4'	Report	Korniyenko 27'	Stadium: Doosan Arena; Attendance: 5,231; Referee: Filip Glova (Slovakia)

11 November 2021 Friendly	Ukraine	v	Bulgaria	Ukraine

==== 2022 FIFA World Cup ====
===== Group D =====
Pos	Team	Pld	W	D	L	GF	GA	GD	Pts	Qualification	France	Ukraine	Finland	Bosnia and Herzegovina	Kazakhstan
1	France	8	5	3	0	18	3	+15	18	Qualification for 2022 FIFA World Cup	—	1–1	2–0	1–1	8–0
2	Ukraine	8	2	6	0	11	8	+3	12	Advance to play-offs	1–1	—	1–1	1–1	1–1
3	Finland	8	3	2	3	10	10	0	11		0–2	1–2	—	2–2	1–0
4	Bosnia and Herzegovina	8	1	4	3	9	12	−3	7		0–1	0–2	1–3	—	2–2
5	Kazakhstan	8	0	3	5	5	20	−15	3		0–2	2–2	0–2	0–2	—

Source: FIFA, UEFA
Rules for classification: Tiebreakers

1 September 2021 2022 FIFA World Cup qualification	Kazakhstan	2–2	Ukraine	Nur-Sultan, Kazakhstan
16:00 (20:00 UTC+6)	Valiullin 74', 90+6'	Report	Yaremchuk 2'; Sikan 90+3'	Stadium: Astana Arena; Attendance: 6,274; Referee: Donatas Rumšas (Lithuania)

4 September 2021 2022 FIFA World Cup qualification	Ukraine	1–1	France	Kyiv, Ukraine
20:45 (21:45 UTC+3)	Shaparenko 44'	Report	Martial 51'	Stadium: NSK Olimpiyskiy; Attendance: 28,000; Referee: Slavko Vinčić (Slovenia)

9 October 2021 2022 FIFA World Cup qualification	Finland	1–2	Ukraine	Helsinki, Finland
18:00 (19:00 UTC+3)		Report		Stadium: Helsinki Olympic Stadium

12 October 2021 2022 FIFA World Cup qualification	Ukraine	1–1	Bosnia and Herzegovina	Lviv, Ukraine
20:45 (21:45 UTC+3)		Report		Stadium: Arena Lviv

16 November 2021 2022 FIFA World Cup qualification	Bosnia and Herzegovina	0–2	Ukraine	Bosnia and Herzegovina
20:45		Report

== UEFA competitions ==
=== UEFA Champions League ===
==== Qualifying phase and play-off round ====
===== Third qualifying round =====
League Path
Team 1	Agg.	Team 2	1st leg	2nd leg
Genk (Belgium)	2–4	(Ukraine) Shakhtar Donetsk	1–2	1–2

===== Play-off round =====
League Path
Team 1	Agg.	Team 2	1st leg	2nd leg
Monaco (France)	2–3	(Ukraine) Shakhtar Donetsk	0–1	2–2 (a.e.t.)

==== Group stage ====
===== Group D =====
Pos	Team	Pld	W	D	L	GF	GA	GD	Pts	Qualification	RMA	INT	SHE	SHK
1	(Spain) Real Madrid	6	5	0	1	14	3	+11	15	Advance to knockout phase	—	2–0	1–2	2–1
2	(Italy) Inter Milan	6	3	1	2	8	5	+3	10	Advance to knockout phase	0–1	—	3–1	2–0
3	(Moldova) Sheriff Tiraspol	6	2	1	3	7	11	−4	7	Transfer to Europa League	0–3	1–3	—	2–0
4	(Ukraine) Shakhtar Donetsk	6	0	2	4	2	12	−10	2		0–5	0–0	1–1	—

Source: UEFA

===== Group E =====
Pos	Team	Pld	W	D	L	GF	GA	GD	Pts	Qualification	BAY	BEN	BAR	DKV
1	(Germany) Bayern Munich	6	6	0	0	22	3	+19	18	Advance to knockout phase	—	5–2	3–0	5–0
2	(Portugal) Benfica	6	2	2	2	7	9	−2	8	Advance to knockout phase	0–4	—	3–0	2–0
3	(Spain) Barcelona	6	2	1	3	2	9	−7	7	Transfer to Europa League	0–3	0–0	—	1–0
4	(Ukraine) Dynamo Kyiv	6	0	1	5	1	11	−10	1		1–2	0–0	0–1	—

Source: UEFA

=== UEFA Europa League ===
==== Qualifying phase and play-off round ====
===== Play-off round =====
Team 1	Agg.	Team 2	1st leg	2nd leg
Rapid Wien (Austria)	6–2	(Ukraine) Zorya Luhansk	3–0	3–2

=== UEFA Conference Cup ===
==== Qualifying phase and play-off round ====
===== Second qualifying round =====
Team 1	Agg.	Team 2	1st leg	2nd leg
KuPS (Finland)	5–4	(Ukraine) Vorskla Poltava	2–2	3–2 (a.e.t.)

===== Third qualifying round =====
Team 1	Agg.	Team 2	1st leg	2nd leg
Kolos Kovalivka (Ukraine)	0–0 (1–3 p)	(Kazakhstan) Shakhter Karagandy	0–0	0–0 (a.e.t.)

==== Group stage ====
===== Group C =====
Pos	Team	Pld	W	D	L	GF	GA	GD	Pts	Qualification	ROM	BOD	ZOR	CSS
1	(Italy) Roma	6	4	1	1	18	11	+7	13	Advance to round of 16	—	2–2	4–0	5–1
2	(Norway) Bodø/Glimt	6	3	3	0	14	5	+9	12	Advance to knockout round play-offs	6–1	—	3–1	2–0
3	(Ukraine) Zorya Luhansk	6	2	1	3	5	11	−6	7		0–3	1–1	—	2–0
4	(Bulgaria) CSKA Sofia	6	0	1	5	3	13	−10	1		2–3	0–0	0–1	—

Source: UEFA

=== UEFA Women's Champions League ===
==== Qualifying round ====
===== Round 1 =====
====== Semi-finals ======
Team 1	Score	Team 2
Zhytlobud-1 Kharkiv (Ukraine)	5–1	(Bulgaria) NSA Sofia

====== Final ======
Team 1	Score	Team 2
Zhytlobud-1 Kharkiv (Ukraine)	4–1	(Slovenia) Pomurje

===== Round 2 =====
Team 1	Agg.	Team 2	1st leg	2nd leg
Apollon Limassol (Cyprus)	2–5	(Ukraine) Zhytlobud-1 Kharkiv	1–2	1–3

==== Group stage ====
===== Group B =====
Pos	Team	Pld	W	D	L	GF	GA	GD	Pts	Qualification	PSG	RMA	KHA	BRE
1	(France) Paris Saint-Germain	6	6	0	0	25	0	+25	18	Advance to Quarter-finals	—	4–0	5–0	6–0
2	(Spain) Real Madrid	6	4	0	2	12	6	+6	12	Advance to Quarter-finals	0–2	—	3–0	5–0
3	(Ukraine) Zhytlobud-1 Kharkiv	6	1	1	4	2	15	−13	4		0–6	0–1	—	0–0
4	(Iceland) Breiðablik	6	0	1	5	0	18	−18	1		0–2	0–3	0–2	—

Source: UEFA

== Men's club football ==
League		Promoted to league	Relegated from league
Premier League		Veres Rivne; Chornomorets Odesa; Metalist 1925 Kharkiv	Olimpik Donetsk
PFL League 1		Uzhhorod; Podillia Khmelnytskyi; Metal Kharkiv; Kryvbas Kryvyi Rih	MFC Mykolaiv; Krystal Kherson
PFL League 2	Groups		
PFL League 2	A	Karpaty Lviv; MFA Mukachevo; LNZ Cherkasy; Livyi Bereh Kyiv; AFSC Kyiv; Lyubomyr Stavyshche	~~Karpaty Lviv~~; ~~Obolon-2 Bucha~~; ~~Volyn-2 Lutsk~~
PFL League 2	B	Viktoriya Mykolaivka; Vovchansk; Sumy; Skoruk Tomakivka; SC Poltava; Trostianets	~~Cherkashchyna~~

Note: For all scratched clubs, see section Clubs removed for more details

=== Location map ===
The following displays the location of teams.

Home venues of teams in the 2021–22 in Ukrainian football.
Teams in italics are from a conflict zone of the war in Donbas and are playing their home games in different cities. SC Tavriya is forced to play its home games outside of Crimea (Autonomous Republic of Crimea).

=== Premier League ===
Pos	Team	Pld	W	D	L	GF	GA	GD	Pts	Qualification or relegation
1	Shakhtar Donetsk	18	15	2	1	49	10	+39	47	Qualification for the Champions League group stage
2	Dynamo Kyiv	18	14	3	1	47	9	+38	45	Qualification for the Champions League second qualifying round
3	Dnipro-1	18	13	1	4	35	17	+18	40	Qualification for the Europa League play-off round
4	Zorya Luhansk	18	11	3	4	37	19	+18	36	Qualification for the Europa Conference League third qualifying round
5	Vorskla Poltava	18	9	6	3	30	18	+12	33	Qualification for the Europa Conference League second qualifying round
6	Oleksandriya	18	7	5	6	19	16	+3	26	
7	Desna Chernihiv (Note: Desna Chernihiv and Mariupol confirmed that they cannot compete next season due to destroyed infrastructure and the difficult situation in their cities.)	18	7	4	7	22	27	−5	25	Membership suspended after season
8	Kolos Kovalivka	18	7	3	8	14	23	−9	24	
9	Veres Rivne	18	6	5	7	15	20	−5	23	
10	Metalist 1925 Kharkiv	18	6	1	11	17	29	−12	19	
11	Rukh Lviv	17	4	6	7	16	21	−5	18	
12	Lviv	18	4	5	9	14	30	−16	17	
13	Chornomorets Odesa	18	3	5	10	20	40	−20	14	
14	Inhulets Petrove	17	3	4	10	13	28	−15	13	
15	Mynai	18	1	7	10	12	30	−18	10	
16	Mariupol	18	2	2	14	21	44	−23	8	Membership suspended after season

Source: upl.ua
Rules for classification: 1) Points; 2) Head-to-head points; 3) Head-to-head goal difference; 4) Head-to-head higher number of goals scored; 5) Goal difference; 6) higher number of goals scored; 7) Draw or "Golden match" if two teams tied for title (Article 22, paragraph 3).

=== PFL League 1 (First League) ===
Pos	Team	Pld	W	D	L	GF	GA	GD	Pts	Promotion, qualification or relegation
1	Metalist Kharkiv (P)	20	17	2	1	52	9	+43	53	Promotion to Ukrainian Premier League
2	Kryvbas Kryvyi Rih (P)	20	12	6	2	38	17	+21	42	Promotion to Ukrainian Premier League
3	Alians Lypova Dolyna (Note: Due to Russo-Ukrainian War, Olimpik Donetsk, Uzhhorod, Podillia Khmelnytskyi, Alians Lypova Dolyna, VPK-Ahro Shevchenkivka and Ahrobiznes Volochysk withdrew from competitions after season.)	19	10	3	6	33	24	+9	33 (Note: Head-to-head: Alians 3p; Obolon 0p)	Withdrew after season
4	Obolon Kyiv	19	10	3	6	24	16	+8	33	
5	Nyva Ternopil	20	8	5	7	22	22	0	29 (Note: Head-to-head: Nyva 6p; Hirnyk-Sport 0p)	
6	Hirnyk-Sport Horishni Plavni	20	8	5	7	15	17	−2	29	
7	Prykarpattia Ivano-Frankivsk	20	8	4	8	27	26	+1	28	
8	Podillya Khmelnytskyi	20	7	5	8	19	18	+1	26	Withdrew after season
9	Polissia Zhytomyr	18	7	4	7	21	17	+4	25	
10	Volyn Lutsk	19	6	7	6	17	20	−3	25	Withdrew after season
11	Olimpik Donetsk	19	7	2	10	19	23	−4	23	Withdrew after season
12	Kramatorsk	18	7	1	10	16	24	−8	22	Withdrew after season
13	Ahrobiznes Volochysk	20	4	9	7	16	23	−7	21	Withdrew after season
14	VPK-Ahro Shevchenkivka	20	5	3	12	16	28	−12	18	Withdrew after season
15	Uzhhorod	20	4	4	12	16	40	−24	16	Withdrew after season
16	Kremin Kremenchuk	20	4	1	15	16	43	−27	13	

Source: PFL.ua
Rules for classification: 1) Points; 2) Head-to-head points; 3) Head-to-head goal difference; 4) Head-to-head goals scored; 5) Goal difference in all games; 6) Goals scored in all games (Note: calculation by criteria indicated in rules 2, 3, 4 is conducted with consideration of all teams that have an equal number of tournament points at the moment of calculation and not only among those which after preliminary criteria have appeared more successful).
(P) Promoted

=== PFL League 2 (Second League) ===
==== Group A ====
Pos	Team	Pld	W	D	L	GF	GA	GD	Pts	Promotion, qualification or relegation
1	Karpaty Lviv	18	16	0	2	46	7	+39	48	Promotion to Ukrainian First League
2	Livyi Bereh Kyiv (Note: Due to Russo-Ukrainian War, Lyubomyr Stavyshche, Karpaty Halych, MFA Mukachevo and Livyi Bereh Kyiv withdrew from competitions after season.)	19	15	1	3	47	14	+33	46	Withdrew after season
3	LNZ Cherkasy	17	13	2	2	36	9	+27	41	Promotion to Ukrainian First League
4	Dinaz Vyshhorod	19	13	1	5	33	18	+15	40	Promotion to Ukrainian First League
5	Epitsentr Dunaivtsi	19	12	1	6	30	19	+11	37	Promotion to Ukrainian First League
6	MFA Mukachevo	19	8	5	6	25	24	+1	29	Withdrew after season
7	Karpaty Halych	18	7	4	7	23	23	0	25 (Note: Karpaty Halych: 3 pts; Nyva: 0 pts)	Withdrew after season
8	Nyva Vinnytsia	17	7	4	6	29	20	+9	25	
9	Bukovyna Chernivtsi	17	6	5	6	20	17	+3	23	Promotion to Ukrainian First League
10	FC Chernihiv	18	5	5	8	17	24	−7	20	Promotion to Ukrainian First League
11	Dnipro Cherkasy	18	5	2	11	24	32	−8	17	Withdrew after season
12	Chaika Petropavlivska Borshchahivka	19	3	6	10	16	40	−24	15	
13	Rubikon Kyiv	18	3	2	13	12	38	−26	11	
14	AFSC Kyiv	19	1	5	13	8	38	−30	8	Withdrew after season
15	Lyubomyr Stavyshche	19	1	1	17	8	51	−43	4	Withdrew after season

Source: PFL.ua
Rules for classification: 1) Points; 2) Head-to-head points; 3) Head-to-head goal difference; 4) Head-to-head goals scored; 5) Goal difference in all games; 6) Goals scored in all games (Note: calculation by criteria indicated in rules 2, 3, 4 is conducted with consideration of all teams that have equal number of tournament points at the moment of calculation and not only among those which after preliminary criteria have appeared more successful).

==== Group B ====
Pos	Team	Pld	W	D	L	GF	GA	GD	Pts	Promotion, qualification or relegation
1	Metalurh Zaporizhzhia	19	13	6	0	34	7	+27	45	Promotion to Ukrainian First League
2	Skoruk Tomakivka	20	12	5	3	33	14	+19	41	Promotion to Ukrainian First League
3	Peremoha Dnipro	20	12	3	5	34	14	+20	39 (Note: Peremoha: 3 pts; Balkany: 0 pts)	Withdrew after season
4	Balkany Zorya	20	10	9	1	34	14	+20	39	Withdrew after season
5	Tavriya Simferopol (Note: Due to Russo-Ukrainian War, Tavriya Simferopol, Enerhiya Nova Kakhovka, Viktoriya Mykolaivka, Sumy and Trostianets withdrew from competitions after the season.)	19	9	6	4	28	19	+9	33	Withdrew after season
6	Poltava	20	9	4	7	29	27	+2	31 (Note: Poltava: 3 pts; Trostianets: 0 pts)	Promotion to Ukrainian First League
7	Trostianets	19	9	4	6	34	29	+5	31	Withdrew after season
8	Mykolaiv	17	8	6	3	35	24	+11	30	Withdrew after season
9	Vovchansk	20	7	6	7	27	25	+2	27 (Note: Vovchansk: 6 pts; Viktoriya: 0 pts)	Withdrew after season
10	Viktoriya Mykolaivka	19	8	3	8	22	23	−1	27	Withdrew after season
11	Yarud Mariupol	20	6	6	8	36	29	+7	24	Promotion to Ukrainian First League
12	Nikopol	20	5	5	10	22	42	−20	20	Withdrew after season
13	Enerhiya Nova Kakhovka	20	5	2	13	20	40	−20	17	Withdrew after season
14	Real Pharma Odesa	20	4	2	14	22	49	−27	14	
15	Krystal Kherson	20	2	3	15	19	36	−17	9	Withdrew after season
16	Sumy	19	1	2	16	16	53	−37	5	Withdrew after season

Source: PFL.ua
Rules for classification: 1) Points; 2) Head-to-head points; 3) Head-to-head goal difference; 4) Head-to-head goals scored; 5) Goal difference in all games; 6) Goals scored in all games (Note: calculation by criteria indicated in rules 2, 3, 4 is conducted with consideration of all teams that have equal number of tournament points at the moment of calculation and not only among those which after preliminary criteria have appeared more successful).

=== Cup competitions ===
==== Super Cup ====
22 September 2021
21:00 EEST

Shakhtar Donetsk	3–0	Dynamo Kyiv
Traoré 30', 54'; Patrick 61'	Report

Olimpiyskiy National Sports Complex, Kyiv
Attendance: 27,553
Referee: Andriy Kovalenko (Poltava)

== Women's club football ==
Promoted	Relegated
Kolos Kovalivka; Ateks Kyiv; Kryvbas Kryvyi Rih (past the 2nd tier)	Nika Mykolaiv

- Kryvbas Kryvyi Rih and Nika Mykolaiv signed a partnership agreement, after which Kryvbas entered top tier, while Nika started at the second.

Note: For the scratched club, see section Clubs removed for more details

=== Vyshcha Liha ===
Pos	Team	Pld	W	D	L	GF	GA	GD	Pts	Qualification or relegation
1	Zhytlobud-2 Kharkiv	10	10	0	0	58	2	+56	30	Qualification for the Champions League qualifying first round
2	Zhytlobud-1 Kharkiv	10	9	0	1	67	5	+62	27	Withdrew
3	Kryvbas Kryvyi Rih	10	7	1	2	26	7	+19	22	
4	Mariupol	10	5	1	4	15	21	−6	16	
5	Kolos Kovalivka	10	5	0	5	12	14	−2	15	
6	Ladomyr Volodymyr-Volynskyi	10	4	2	4	22	20	+2	14	
7	EMS Podillia Vinnytsia	10	4	1	5	9	25	−16	13 (Note: Head-to-head points: Podillia 3, Voskhod 0)	
8	Voskhod Stara Maiachka	10	4	1	5	11	18	−7	13	Withdrew
9	Pantery Uman	10	2	0	8	10	46	−36	6 (Note: Head-to-head points: Pantery 3, Karpaty 0)	
10	Karpaty Lviv	10	2	0	8	13	37	−24	6	Withdrew
11	Ateks Kyiv	10	0	0	10	3	51	−48	0	

Source: womensfootball.com.ua
Rules for classification: 1) Points; 2) Head-to-head points; 3) Head-to-head goal difference; 4) Head-to-head goals scored; 5) Goal difference; 6) Goals scored.

== Managerial changes ==
This is a list of managerial changes among Ukrainian professional football clubs:

Team	Outgoing manager	Manner of departure	Date of vacancy	Table	Incoming manager	Date of appointment	Table

== Clubs removed ==
- Obolon-2
- Volyn-2
- FC Cherkashchyna
- Karpaty Lviv
- Bukovynska Nadiya
