= 2021–22 Arsenal W.F.C. season =

English women's football club season

Arsenal Women
2021–22 season
- Owner: Kroenke Sports & Entertainment
- Manager: Jonas Eidevall
- Stadium: Meadow Park; Emirates Stadium (Select home games)
- WSL: 2nd
- FA Cup: Semi-finals
- League Cup: Quarter-finals
- Champions League: Quarter-finals
- Top goalscorer: League: Vivianne Miedema (14); All: Vivianne Miedema (23)
- Highest home attendance: 13,438 (vs Tottenham Hotspur, 5 May 2022)
- Lowest home attendance: 808 (vs 1899 Hoffenheim, Champions League, 14 October 2021)
- Average home league attendance: 3,544
- Biggest win: 7–0 (vs Aston Villa (H), 1 May 2022)
- Biggest defeat: 0–4 (vs FC Barcelona (H), Champions League, 9 December 2021)
Home colours	Away colours	Third colours
- All statistics correct as of 8 May 2022.

The 2021–22 season was Arsenal Women's Football Club's 35th season of competitive football. The club participated in the WSL, the FA Cup, the League Cup and the Champions League.

== Squad information & statistics ==
Statistics as of 8 May 2022, includes postponed matches of the 2020–21 Women's FA Cup.

=== First team squad ===
No.	Name	Date of birth (age)	Since	Last Contract	Signed from
Goalkeepers
1	(Austria) Manuela Zinsberger	19 October 1995 (aged 26)	2019	February 2021	(Germany) Bayern Munich
18	(Australia) Lydia Williams	13 May 1988 (aged 34)	2020	May 2021	(Australia) Melbourne City
Defenders
2	(Brazil) Rafaelle Souza	18 June 1991 (aged 31)	2022	January 2022	(China) Changchun Zhuoyue
3	(England) Lotte Wubben-Moy	11 January 1999 (aged 23)	2020	September 2020	(United States) University of North Carolina
4	(England) Anna Patten	20 April 1999 (aged 23)	2021	January 2021	(United States) University of South Carolina
5	(Scotland) Jen Beattie	13 May 1991 (aged 31)	2019	June 2019	(England) Manchester City
6	(England) Leah Williamson	29 March 1997 (aged 25)	2014	June 2021	(England) Arsenal Academy
7	(Australia) Steph Catley	26 January 1994 (aged 28)	2020	May 2022	(Australia) Melbourne City
16	(Switzerland) Noelle Maritz	23 December 1995 (aged 26)	2020	May 2022	(Germany) VfL Wolfsburg
20	(Denmark) Simone Boye Sørensen	3 March 1992 (aged 30)	2021	July 2021	(Germany) Bayern Munich
22	(Austria) Viktoria Schnaderbeck	4 January 1991 (aged 31)	2018	June 2020	(Germany) Bayern Munich
26	(Austria) Laura Wienroither	13 January 1999 (aged 23)	2022	January 2022	(Germany) TSV Hoffenheim
29	(England) Teyah Goldie	27 June 2004 (aged 18)	2021		(England) Arsenal Academy
Midfielders
8	(England) Jordan Nobbs	8 December 1992 (aged 29)	2010	April 2020	(England) Sunderland
10	(Scotland) Kim Little (c)	29 June 1990 (aged 32)	2016	August 2019	(United States) Seattle Reign
12	(Norway) Frida Maanum	16 July 1999 (aged 22)	2021	July 2021	(Sweden) Linköpings FC
13	(Switzerland) Lia Wälti	19 April 1993 (aged 29)	2018	December 2019	(Germany) Turbine Potsdam
33	(England) Halle Houssein	11 December 2004 (aged 17)	2021		(England) Arsenal Academy
Forwards
9	(England) Beth Mead	9 May 1995 (aged 27)	2017	November 2019	(England) Sunderland
11	(Netherlands) Vivianne Miedema	15 July 1996 (aged 25)	2017	December 2018	(Germany) Bayern Munich
14	(England) Nikita Parris	10 March 1994 (aged 28)	2021	July 2021	(France) Olympique Lyonnais
15	(Republic of Ireland) Katie McCabe	21 September 1995 (aged 26)	2015	May 2021	(Republic of Ireland) Shelbourne
19	(Australia) Caitlin Foord	11 November 1994 (aged 27)	2020	January 2020	(Australia) Sydney FC
23	(Japan) Mana Iwabuchi	18 March 1993 (aged 29)	2021	May 2021	(England) Aston Villa
25	(Sweden) Stina Blackstenius	5 February 1996 (aged 26)	2022	January 2022	(Sweden) BK Häcken
35	(England) Alex Hennessy	23 November 2004 (aged 17)	2021		(England) Arsenal Academy
77	(United States) Tobin Heath	29 May 1988 (aged 34)	2021	September 2021	(England) Manchester United

=== Appearances and goals ===
No.	Name	WSL		FA Cup		League Cup		UWCL		Total	
No.	Name	Apps	Goals	Apps	Goals	Apps	Goals	Apps	Goals	Apps	Goals
Goalkeepers
1	(Austria) Manuela Zinsberger	20	0	2	0	1	0	8	0	31	0
18	(Australia) Lydia Williams	2	0	2	0	0	0	4	0	8	0
Defenders
2	(Brazil) Rafaelle Souza	4+2	1	1	0	0	0	0	0	5+2	1
3	(England) Lotte Wubben-Moy	13+4	2	2+1	0	0	0	6+2	2	21+7	4
4	(England) Anna Patten	1+3	0	0	0	0	0	3+4	1	4+7	1
5	(Scotland) Jen Beattie	7+2	1	1+1	0	1	0	6+2	0	15+5	1
6	(England) Leah Williamson	17+1	2	2	1	0+1	0	7	1	26+2	4
7	(Australia) Steph Catley	14+4	1	2	0	0	0	9+3	1	25+7	2
16	(Switzerland) Noelle Maritz	19	0	2	0	1	0	9	0	31	0
20	(Denmark) Simone Boye Sørensen	2+3	0	2+1	0	0	0	3+1	0	7+5	0
22	(Austria) Viktoria Schnaderbeck	0+2	0	0	0	1	0	0+1	0	1+3	0
26	(Austria) Laura Wienroither	3+5	0	1+1	0	0+1	0	0+1	0	4+8	0
29	(England) Teyah Goldie	0	0	0+1	0	0	0	0+2	0	0+3	0
Midfielders
8	(England) Jordan Nobbs	5+11	2	2+1	0	1	0	4+3	1	12+15	3
10	(Scotland) Kim Little (c)	21+1	6	4	2	1	0	11+1	4	38+3	12
12	(Norway) Frida Maanum	10+11	3	2+2	0	1	0	10+2	1	23+15	4
13	(Switzerland) Lia Wälti	18+2	0	2+1	0	0	0	5+3	0	25+6	0
33	(England) Halle Houssein	0+1	0	0	0	0	0	0	0	0+1	0
Forwards
9	(England) Beth Mead	20+3	11	2+1	1	1	0	9+2	1	32+6	13
11	(Netherlands) Vivianne Miedema	21+1	14	2+1	2	1	0	9+3	7	33+5	23
14	(England) Nikita Parris	5+13	1	3+1	2	1	0	6+6	3	15+20	6
15	(Republic of Ireland) Katie McCabe	17+3	5	4	1	1	0	10+2	0	32+5	6
19	(Australia) Caitlin Foord	9+7	4	2+1	4	0	0	4+5	2	15+13	10
23	(Japan) Mana Iwabuchi	3+8	1	1	1	0	0	4+4	3	8+12	5
25	(Sweden) Stina Blackstenius	7+4	6	2	1	0+1	0	2	0	11+5	7
35	(England) Alex Hennessy	0+1	0	0	0	0	0	0	0	0+1	0
77	(United States) Tobin Heath	3+6	2	1+2	0	0+1	0	2+2	1	6+11	3

=== Goalscorers ===
Rank	No.	Position	Name	WSL	FA Cup	League Cup	UWCL	Total
1	11	FW	(Netherlands) Vivianne Miedema	14	2	0	7	23
2	9	FW	(England) Beth Mead	11	1	0	1	13
3	10	MF	(Scotland) Kim Little	6	1	0	4	11
4	19	FW	(Australia) Caitlin Foord	4	2	0	2	8
5	25	FW	(Sweden) Stina Blackstenius	6	1	0	0	7
6	15	FW	(Republic of Ireland) Katie McCabe	5	1	0	0	6
6	14	FW	(England) Nikita Parris	1	1	0	3	5
8	23	FW	(Japan) Mana Iwabuchi	1	0	0	3	4
9	12	MF	(Norway) Frida Maanum	3	0	0	1	4
9	3	DF	(England) Lotte Wubben-Moy	2	0	0	2	4
9	6	DF	(England) Leah Williamson	2	0	0	1	3
12	77	FW	(United States) Tobin Heath	2	0	0	1	3
12	8	MF	(England) Jordan Nobbs	2	0	0	1	3
14	7	DF	(Australia) Steph Catley	1	0	0	1	2
15	4	DF	(England) Anna Patten	0	0	0	1	1
15	5	DF	(Scotland) Jen Beattie	1	0	0	0	1
15	2	DF	(Brazil) Rafaelle Souza	1	0	0	0	1
Own goal				3	0	0	1	4
Total				65	9	0	29	103

=== Disciplinary record ===
Rank	No.	Position	Name	WSL		FA Cup		League Cup		UWCL		Total	
Rank	No.	Position	Name	Booked	Sent off (straight red)	Booked	Sent off (straight red)	Booked	Sent off (straight red)	Booked	Sent off (straight red)	Booked	Sent off (straight red)
1	15	FW	(Republic of Ireland) Katie McCabe	8	1	1	0	0	0	2	0	11	1
2	9	FW	(England) Beth Mead	1	0	1	0	0	0	3	0	5	0
2	16	DF	(Switzerland) Noelle Maritz	3	0	0	0	0	0	2	0	5	0
4	13	MF	(Switzerland) Lia Wälti	2	0	0	0	0	0	2	0	4	0
4	19	FW	(Australia) Caitlin Foord	2	0	0	0	0	0	2	0	4	0
6	14	FW	(England) Nikita Parris	2	0	0	0	0	0	1	0	3	0
7	8	MF	(England) Jordan Nobbs	1	0	0	0	0	0	1	0	2	0
7	12	MF	(Norway) Frida Maanum	0	0	0	0	0	0	2	0	2	0
7	5	DF	(Scotland) Jen Beattie	0	0	0	0	1	0	1	0	2	0
7	11	FW	(Netherlands) Vivianne Miedema	2	0	0	0	0	0	0	0	2	0
11	23	FW	(Japan) Mana Iwabuchi	1	0	0	0	0	0	0	0	1	0
11	2	DF	(Brazil) Rafaelle Souza	1	0	0	0	0	0	0	0	1	0
11	6	DF	(England) Leah Williamson	1	0	0	0	0	0	0	0	1	0
11	3	DF	(England) Lotte Wubben-Moy	1	0	0	0	0	0	0	0	1	0
Total				25	1	2	0	1	0	16	0	44	1

=== Clean sheets ===
Rank	No.	Name	WSL	FA Cup	League Cup	UWCL	Total
1	1	(Austria) Manuela Zinsberger	13	2	0	3	18
2	18	(Australia) Lydia Williams	2	2	0	2	6
Total			15	4	0	5	24

== Transfers, loans, and other signings ==
=== Transfers in ===
Announcement date	No.	Position	Player	From club
26 May 2021	23	FW	(Japan) Mana Iwabuchi	(England) Aston Villa
2 July 2021	14	FW	(England) Nikita Parris	(France) Lyon
22 July 2021	20	DF	(Denmark) Simone Boye Sørensen	(Germany) Bayern Munich
27 July 2021	12	MF	(Norway) Frida Maanum	(Sweden) Linköping FC
3 September 2021	77	FW	(United States) Tobin Heath	(England) Manchester United
14 January 2022	25	FW	(Sweden) Stina Blackstenius	(Sweden) BK Häcken
15 January 2022	26	DF	(Austria) Laura Wienroither	(Germany) 1899 Hoffenheim
18 January 2022	2	DF	(Brazil) Rafaelle Souza	(China) Changchun Zhuoyue

=== Contract extensions ===
Announcement date	No.	Position	Player	At Arsenal since
4 May 2021	15	FW	(Republic of Ireland) Katie McCabe	2015
9 June 2021	18	GK	(Australia) Lydia Williams	2020
16 June 2021	6	DF	(England) Leah Williamson	2014
5 May 2022	7	DF	(Australia) Steph Catley	2020
6 May 2022	Coach		(Sweden) Jonas Eidevall	2021

=== Transfers out ===
Announcement date	No.	Position	Player	To club
10 May 2021	14	MF	(Netherlands) Jill Roord	(Germany) Wolfsburg
18 May 2021	20	MF	(Germany) Leonie Maier	(England) Everton
11 June 2021	30	DF	(England) Ruby Mace	(England) Manchester City
21 June 2021	7	MF	(Netherlands) Daniëlle van de Donk	(France) Lyon
28 January 2022	21	MF	(Switzerland) Malin Gut	(Switzerland) Grasshopper
28 April 2022	77	FW	(United States) Tobin Heath	(United States) OL Reign

=== Loans out ===
Announcement date	No.	Position	Player	To club
13 August 2021	17	FW	(Scotland) Lisa Evans	(England) West Ham United
2 September 2021	24	GK	(England) Fran Stenson	(England) Brighton & Hove Albion
5 January 2022	4	DF	(England) Anna Patten	(England) Aston Villa

== Suspensions ==
No.	Position	Player	Games suspended		Reason
16	DF	(Switzerland) Noelle Maritz	1/1	vs. (Czech Republic) Slavia Prague, 9 September 2021	Accumulated two yellow cards in UWCL qualifying round
15	FW	(Republic of Ireland) Katie McCabe	1/1	vs. Brighton & Hove Albion, 27 January 2022	Accumulated five domestic yellow cards
15	FW	(Republic of Ireland) Katie McCabe	1/1	vs. Chelsea, 11 February 2022	Red card (two yellows) vs. Manchester United
9	FW	(England) Beth Mead	1/1	vs. (Germany) VfL Wolfsburg, 31 March 2022	Accumulated three yellow cards in UWCL groupstage / knock-out phases

== Club ==
=== Kits ===
Supplier: Adidas / Sponsor: Fly Emirates / Sleeve sponsor: Visit Rwanda

Home	Home alt.	Away	Third	Goalkeeper^{1}	Goalkeeper ^{2}	Goalkeeper ^{3}	Goalkeeper ^{4}

==== Kit usage ====
Kit	Combination	Usage	
Home	Red body; White sleeves; White shorts; Red hooped socks	WSL	Chelsea (H), Manchester City (H), Everton (H), West Ham United (H),Tottenham Hotspur (A), Leicester City (H), Brighton & Hove Albion (H), Manchester United (H), Reading (H), Birmingham City (H), Brighton & Hove Albion (A), Aston Villa (H), Tottenham Hotspur (H)
Home	Red body; White sleeves; White shorts; Red hooped socks	FA Cup	London City Lionesses (H), Coventry United (H), Chelsea (H)
Home	Red body; White sleeves; White shorts; Red hooped socks	League Cup	Manchester United (H)
Home	Red body; White sleeves; White shorts; Red hooped socks	UWCL	Okzhetpes (N), PSV (N), Slavia Praha (H), 1899 Hoffenheim (H), Køge (H), Barcelona (H), Wolfsburg (H), Wolfsburg (A)
Home alt.	Red body; White sleeves; White shorts; Red socks	UWCL	1899 Hoffenheim (A)
Away	Yellow body; Yellow sleeves; Yellow shorts; Yellow socks	WSL	Reading (A), Aston Villa (A), Manchester United (A), Birmingham City (A), Manchester City (A), Chelsea (A), Leicester City (A), Everton (A), West Ham United (A)
Away	Yellow body; Yellow sleeves; Yellow shorts; Yellow socks	FA Cup	Liverpool (A)
Away	Yellow body; Yellow sleeves; Yellow shorts; Yellow socks	UWCL	Slavia Praha (A), Barcelona (A), Køge (A)

==== Goalkeeper kit usage ====
Kit	Combination	Usage	
Goalkeeper 1	Green body; Green sleeves; Green shorts; Green socks	WSL	Chelsea (H); Manchester City (A); Aston Villa (A); Everton (H); West Ham United (H); Birmingham City (A); Manchester United (H); Reading (H); Birmingham City (H); Brighton & Hove Albion (A); Leicester City (A); Aston Villa (H); Tottenham Hotspur (H); West Ham United (A)
Goalkeeper 1	Green body; Green sleeves; Green shorts; Green socks	FA Cup	Liverpool (A)
Goalkeeper 1	Green body; Green sleeves; Green shorts; Green socks	League Cup	Manchester United (H)
Goalkeeper 1	Green body; Green sleeves; Green shorts; Green socks	UWCL	Okzhetpes (N); PSV (N); Slavia Praha (H); Slavia Praha (A); Barcelona (A); 1899 Hoffenheim (H); Køge (A); 1899 Hoffenheim (A)
Goalkeeper 2	Orange body; Orange sleeves; Orange shorts; Orange socks	WSL	Reading (A); Tottenham Hotspur (A); Manchester United (A); Leicester City (H); Manchester City (A); Brighton & Hove Albion (H); Chelsea (A); Everton (A)
Goalkeeper 2	Orange body; Orange sleeves; Orange shorts; Orange socks	FA Cup	London City Lionesses (H); Coventry United (H); Chelsea (H)
Goalkeeper 2	Orange body; Orange sleeves; Orange shorts; Orange socks	UWCL	Wolfsburg (H); Wolfsburg (A)
Goalkeeper 3	Blue body; Blue sleeves; Blue shorts; Blue socks	UWCL	Køge (H); Barcelona (H)

== Pre-season ==
1 August 2021 Friendly	Arsenal	2–1	Chelsea	London
12:15 BST	McCabe 28'; Jupp 82'	Report	Blades 80'	Stadium: Emirates Stadium

8 August 2021 Friendly	Tottenham Hotspur	0–4	Arsenal	London
		Report	Hennessy 34', 90'; McCabe 75'; Patten 89'	Stadium: Tottenham Hotspur Stadium

== Competitions ==
=== Overall record ===
Competition	First match	Last match	Starting round	Final position	Record							
Competition	First match	Last match	Starting round	Final position	Pld	W	D	L	GF	GA	GD	Win %
FA WSL	5 September 2021	8 May 2022	Matchday 1	2nd	22	17	4	1	65	10	+55	77.27
Women's FA Cup	30 January 2022	17 April 2022	Fourth round	Semi-finals	4	3	0	1	9	2	+7	75.00
FA Women's League Cup	19 January 2022		Quarter-finals	Quarter-finals	1	0	0	1	0	1	−1	0.00
UEFA Women's Champions League	18 August 2021	31 March 2022	First qualifying round	Quarter-finals	12	7	1	4	29	17	+12	58.33
Total					39	27	5	7	103	30	+73	69.23

Source: FA WSL

=== FA WSL ===
==== League table ====
Pos	Team	Pld	W	D	L	GF	GA	GD	Pts	Qualification or relegation
1	Chelsea (C)	22	18	2	2	62	11	+51	56	Qualification for the Champions League group stage
2	Arsenal	22	17	4	1	65	10	+55	55	Qualification for the Champions League second round
3	Manchester City	22	15	2	5	60	22	+38	47	Qualification for the Champions League first round
4	Manchester United	22	12	6	4	45	22	+23	42	
5	Tottenham Hotspur	22	9	5	8	24	23	+1	32	

Source: FA WSL
Rules for classification: 1) Points; 2) Goal difference; 3) Number of goals scored.
(C) Champions

==== Results summary ====
Overall								Home						Away					
Pld	W	D	L	GF	GA	GD	Pts	W	D	L	GF	GA	GD	W	D	L	GF	GA	GD
22	17	4	1	65	10	+55	55	10	1	0	40	6	+34	7	3	1	25	4	+21

Last updated: 8 May 2022.
Source: FA WSL

==== Results by matchday ====
Matchday	1	2	3	4	5	6	7	8	9	10	11	12	13	14	15	16	17	18	19	20	21	22
Ground	H	A	H	A	H	H	A	A	H	A	A	H	H	A	H	H	A	A	A	H	H	A
Result	W	W	W	W	W	W	D	W	W	L	D	W	D	D	W	W	W	W	W	W	W	W
Position	4	2	1	1	1	1	1	1	1	1	1	1	1	1	1	1	1	2	2	2	2	2

Updated to match(es) played on 8 May 2022. Source: FA WSL
W = Win; D = Draw; L = Loss

==== Matches ====
5 September 2021 1	Arsenal	3–2	Chelsea	Holloway
12:30 BST	McCabe (yellow card) 23'; Miedema 14'; Mead 49', 60'; Parris (yellow card) 85'	Report	Cuthbert 44'; Harder 64'; Eriksson (yellow card) 66'	Stadium: Emirates Stadium; Attendance: 8,705; Referee: Rebecca Welch
Note: Broadcast on Sky Sports

12 September 2021 2	Reading	0–4	Arsenal	Reading
14:00 BST	Rowe (yellow card) 23'	Report	Beattie 17'; Mead 30'; Miedema 32', 50'; McCabe (yellow card) 84'	Stadium: Select Car Leasing Stadium; Attendance: 1,127; Referee: Emily Heaslip

26 September 2021 3	Arsenal	5–0	Manchester City	Borehamwood
18:45 BST	Miedema 10'; Little 23', 78' (pen.); McCabe 60'; Maritz (yellow card) 67'; Williamson 90+4'	Report	Stokes (yellow card) 45+3'	Stadium: Meadow Park; Attendance: 2,061; Referee: Jane Simms
Note: Broadcast on Sky Sports

2 October 2021 4	Aston Villa	0–4	Arsenal	Walsall
17:15 BST	Pacheco (yellow card) 57'	Report	Little 51', 90+2'; Iwabuchi 80'; McCabe 83'	Stadium: Bescot Stadium; Attendance: 4,780; Referee: Emily Heaslip
Note: Broadcast on BBC Two

10 October 2021 5	Arsenal	3–0	Everton	Borehamwood
15:00 BST	McCabe 32'; Wubben-Moy 41'; Maanum 86'	Report		Stadium: Meadow Park; Attendance: 2,165; Referee: Helen Conley

7 November 2021 6	Arsenal	4–0	West Ham United	Borehamwood
15:00 GMT	Little 39', 52'; Mead 61'; Fisk 84' (o.g.); McCabe (yellow card) 90+2'	Report	Cissoko (yellow card) 14'	Stadium: Meadow Park; Attendance: 1,736; Referee: Kirsty Dowle
Note: Broadcast on Sky Sports

13 November 2021 7	Tottenham Hotspur	1–1	Arsenal	Harrow
13:30 GMT	Clemaron (yellow card) 50'; Williams 65'; Neville (yellow card) 82'; Ayane (yellow card) 90+1'	Report	Mead (yellow card) 82'; Miedema 90+2'	Stadium: The Hive; Attendance: 2,896; Referee: Amy Fearn
Note: Broadcast on BBC One

21 November 2021 8	Manchester United	0–2	Arsenal	Leigh
12:15 GMT	Blundell (yellow card) 75'	Report	Miedema 48'; McCabe (yellow card) 51', (goal) 57' (pen.)	Stadium: Leigh Sports Village; Attendance: 2,186; Referee: Emily Heaslip

12 December 2021 9	Arsenal	4–0	Leicester City	Borehamwood
15:00 GMT	Nobbs 22' (yellow card) 90+3'; Miedema 34'; Maanum 81', 83'	Report	Sigsworth (yellow card) 3'; O'Brien (yellow card) 6'; Purfield (red card) 43'; Tierney (yellow card) 82'; Plumptre (yellow card) 86'	Stadium: Meadow Park; Attendance: 1,316; Referee: Emily Heaslip

9 January 2022 10	Birmingham City	2–0	Arsenal	Birmingham
14:00 GMT	Smith 3'; Sarri 42'; Scott (yellow card) 85'; Lu. Quinn (yellow card) 90'	Report	Iwabuchi (yellow card) 60'; Miedema (yellow card) 79'	Stadium: St Andrew's; Attendance: 582; Referee: Lucy May

23 January 2022 11	Manchester City	1–1	Arsenal	Manchester
14:00 GMT	Stanway (yellow card) 16'; Hemp (yellow card) 33'; Shaw 65'; Weir (yellow card) 90'; Walsh (yellow card) 90+6'	Report	McCabe (yellow card) 32'; Parris (yellow card) 55'; Miedema (yellow card) 83'; Heath 90+2'	Stadium: Academy Stadium; Attendance: 2,355; Referee: Abigail Byrne

27 January 2022 12	Arsenal	2–1	Brighton & Hove Albion	Borehamwood
19:30 GMT	Miedema 55'; Mead 60'	Report	Koivisto 15'; Brazil (yellow card) 24'; Le Tissier (yellow card) 54'; Williams (yellow card) 60'	Stadium: Meadow Park; Attendance: 1,617; Referee: Kirsty Dowle
Note: The match was originally scheduled on 19 December 2021, but was postponed by the FA following ongoing COVID-19 issues.

5 February 2022 13	Arsenal	1–1	Manchester United	Borehamwood
12:30 GMT	McCabe (yellow card) 57' (yellow-red card) 75'; Miedema (yellow card) 63'; Blackstenius 79'	Report	Russo 10'; Caldwell (yellow card) 55'	Stadium: Meadow Park; Attendance: 2,385; Referee: Elizabeth Simms

13 February 2022 14	Chelsea	0–0	Arsenal	Kingston upon Thames
15:00 GMT	Reiten (yellow card) 52'	Report	Maritz (yellow card) 44'; Wälti (yellow card) 53'	Stadium: Kingsmeadow; Attendance: 3,330; Referee: Rebecca Welch

2 March 2022 15	Arsenal	4–0	Reading	Borehamwood
19:15 GMT	Miedema 22'; McCabe 24'; Williamson 34'; Blackstenius 72'	Report		Stadium: Meadow Park; Attendance: 1,554; Referee: James Bell
Note: The match was originally scheduled on 16 January 2022, but was postponed by the FA following ongoing COVID-19 issues.

6 March 2022 16	Arsenal	4–2	Birmingham City	Borehamwood
12:00 GMT	Rafaelle 14'; Miedema 31'; Wälti (yellow card) 61'; Mead 71'; Wienroither (yellow card) 75'; Foord 90+2'	Report	Lawley (yellow card) 44'; Holloway (yellow card) 58'; Smith 76'; Quinn 82'	Stadium: Meadow Park; Attendance: 1,700; Referee: Robert Massey-Ellis

13 March 2022 17	Brighton & Hove Albion	0–3	Arsenal	Crawley
18:45 GMT	Kullberg (yellow card) 81'; Kaagman (yellow card) 90+2'	Report	Williamson (yellow card) 8'; Blackstenius 27', 41'; Mead 34'; Foord (yellow card) 63'	Stadium: Broadfield Stadium; Attendance: 2,535; Referee: Tom Reeves

3 April 2022 18	Leicester City	0–5	Arsenal	Leicester
14:00 BST	Tierney (yellow card) 38'; O'Brien (yellow card) 57'	Report	Mead 2'; Wubben-Moy (yellow card) 12'; McCabe (yellow card) 15'; Miedema 67', 75'; Plumptre 79' (o.g.); Heath 83'	Stadium: King Power Stadium; Attendance: 2,158; Referee: Rebecca Welch

24 April 2022 19	Everton	0–3	Arsenal	Liverpool
13:00 BST		Report	Foord 43'; Mead 67'; Nobbs 75'	Stadium: Walton Hall Park; Attendance: 583; Referee: Kirsty Dowle

1 May 2022 20	Arsenal	7–0	Aston Villa	Borehamwood
15:00 BST	Miedema 9', 13'; Corsie 52' (o.g.); Mead 61'; Wubben-Moy 66'; Blackstenius 83'; Parris 90' (pen.); Foord (yellow card) 90+1'	Report	Petzelberger (yellow card) 54'	Stadium: Meadow Park; Attendance: 2,305; Referee: Lisa Benn

4 May 2022 21	Arsenal	3–0	Tottenham Hotspur	Holloway
19:15 BST	Mead 4'; Foord 71', 82'; McCabe (yellow card) 73'	Report	Simon (yellow card) 24'; Summanen (yellow card) 57'; Green (yellow card) 73'; Clemaron (yellow card) 74'; Addison (penalty missed) 90+8'	Stadium: Emirates Stadium; Attendance: 13,438; Referee: Louise Saunders
Note: The match was originally scheduled on 26 March 2022, but was postponed by the FA upon Tottenham's request following "significant" COVID-19 cases.

8 May 2022 22	West Ham United	0–2	Arsenal	Dagenham
12:00 BST	Brynjarsdóttir (yellow card) 54'	Report	Maritz (yellow card) 6'; Blackstenius 60'; Catley 66'	Stadium: Victoria Road; Attendance: 2,585; Referee: Emily Heaslip

=== FA Cup ===
As a member of the top two tiers, Arsenal enters the FA Cup in the fourth round.

30 January 2022 Fourth round	Arsenal	1–0	London City Lionesses	Borehamwood
12:30 GMT	Miedema 44'; McCabe (yellow card) 90+3'	BBC Sport; Sky Sports	Fitzgerald (yellow card) 73'	Stadium: Meadow Park; Referee: Chloe-Ann Anderson; Assistant referees: Hugh Gilroy, Ceri Louise Williams; Fourth official: Jack Packman

27 February 2022 Fifth round	Liverpool	0–4	Arsenal	Birkenhead
12:00 GMT	Robe (yellow card) 42'	Report	Foord 19', 33'; McCabe 31'; Little 62'	Stadium: Prenton Park; Referee: Louise Saunders

18 March 2022 Quarter-finals	Arsenal	4–0	Coventry United	Borehamwood
19:00 GMT	Blackstenius 38'; Mead 59'; Parris 63'; Miedema 77'	Report		Stadium: Meadow Park; Referee: Abigail Bryne

17 April 2022 Semi-finals	Arsenal	0–2	Chelsea	Borehamwood
12:30 GMT	Mead (yellow card) 48'	Report	Reiten 50'; Ji 61'; Cuthbert (yellow card) 65'	Stadium: Meadow Park; Referee: Rebecca Welch

=== FA Women's League Cup ===
Arsenal automatically qualified for the quarter-finals of the League Cup because of reaching the Champions League group stage.

19 January 2022 Quarter-finals	Arsenal	0–1	Manchester United	Borehamwood
19:15 GMT	Beattie (yellow card) 84'	Report	Thomas (yellow card) 59'; Ladd (yellow card) 66'; Russo 85'; Toone (yellow card) 87'	Stadium: Meadow Park; Attendance: 825; Referee: Tom Reeves

=== UEFA Women's Champions League ===
==== First qualifying round ====
18 August 2021 Semi-final	Arsenal (England)	4–0	(Kazakhstan) Okzhetpes	Moscow
11:00 BST	Iwabuchi 14'; Little 18' (pen.); Mead 65'; Parris 75'	Report		Stadium: Sapsan Arena; Referee: Katarzyna Lisiecka-Sęk (Poland)

21 August 2021 Final	Arsenal (England)	3–1	(Netherlands) PSV	Moscow
18:00 BST	Miedema 19'; Iwabuchi 39', 65'; McCabe (yellow card) 58'; Maritz (yellow card) 76'	Report	Rodriguez (yellow card) 22'; Brugts 51'; Biesmans (yellow card) 56'	Stadium: Sapsan Arena; Referee: Petra Pavlikova (Slovakia)

==== Second qualifying round ====
31 August 2021 First leg	Arsenal (England)	3–0	(Czech Republic) Slavia Prague	Borehamwood
20:30 BST	Parris 2'; Little 31' (pen.); Maritz (yellow card) 35'; Maanum (yellow card) 54'; Miedema 72'	Report	Bartovičová (yellow card) 30'; Kožárová (yellow card) 58'; Černá (yellow card) 73'	Stadium: Meadow Park; Referee: Maria Marotta (Italia)

9 September 2021 Second leg	Slavia Prague (Czech Republic)	0–4 (0–7 agg.)	(England) Arsenal	Prague
17:30 BST	Bartovičová (yellow card) 44'; Šurnovská (yellow card) 51'; Černá (yellow card) 76'; Krejčiříková (yellow card) 79'	Report	Miedema 60', 70', 72'; Little 76' (pen.)	Stadium: Eden Arena; Referee: Reelika Turi (Estonia)

==== Group stage ====
Pos	Team	Pld	W	D	L	GF	GA	GD	Pts	Qualification	BAR	ARS	HOF	KOG
1	(Spain) Barcelona	6	6	0	0	24	1	+23	18	Advance to Quarter-finals	—	4–1	4–0	5–0
2	(England) Arsenal	6	3	0	3	14	13	+1	9 (Note: Head-to-head points: Arsenal 3, 1899 Hoffenheim 3. Head-to-head goal differences: Arsenal +1, 1899 Hoffenheim −1.)	Advance to Quarter-finals	0–4	—	4–0	3–0
3	(Germany) 1899 Hoffenheim	6	3	0	3	11	15	−4	9		0–5	4–1	—	5–0
4	(Denmark) Køge	6	0	0	6	2	22	−20	0		0–2	1–5	1–2	—

Source: UEFA
Rules for classification: Group stage tiebreakers
Notes:

5 October 2021 1	FC Barcelona (Spain)	4–1	(England) Arsenal	Barcelona
20:00 BST	Caldentey 31'; Putellas 42' (penalty missed) 90+5'; Paredes (yellow card) 46'; Oshoala 47'; Martens 84'	Report	McCabe (yellow card) 35'; Mead (yellow card) 51'; Maanum 74'; Foord (yellow card) 76'; Nobbs (yellow card) 90+4'; Parris (yellow card) 90+5'	Stadium: Estadi Johan Cruyff; Referee: Jana Adamkova

14 October 2021 2	Arsenal (England)	4–0	(Germany) 1899 Hoffenheim	Borehamwood
20:00 BST	Little 21' (pen.); Heath 45+1'; Miedema 51'; Maanum (yellow card) 61'; Williamson 86'	Report	Specht (yellow card) 20'	Stadium: Meadow Park; Attendance: 808; Referee: Stephanie Frappart

10 November 2021 3	Køge (Denmark)	1–5	(England) Arsenal	Køge
17:45 GMT	Pokorny 71'	Report	Catley 27'; Parris (penalty missed) 16', 62'; Foord 68'; Patten 85'; Nobbs 89'	Stadium: Køge Stadium; Attendance: 2,103; Referee: Sandra Braz Bastos

17 November 2021 4	Arsenal (England)	3–0	(Denmark) Køge	Borehamwood
20:00 GMT	Foord 15'; Wubben-Moy 83'; Miedema 88'	Report		Stadium: Meadow Park; Attendance: 819; Referee: Kateryna Monzul

9 December 2021 5	Arsenal (England)	0–4	(Spain) FC Barcelona	Holloway
19:00 GMT	Foord (yellow card) 26'; Wälti (yellow card) 60'; Mead (yellow card) 90+1'	Report	Torrejón (yellow card) 20'; Bonmatí 22'; Hermoso 28', 75'; Putellas (yellow card) 30'; Rolfö 45+1'	Stadium: Emirates Stadium; Attendance: 12,232; Referee: Anastasia Pustoviotova

15 December 2021 6	1899 Hoffenheim (Germany)	4–1	(England) Arsenal	Hoffenheim
20:00 GMT	Brand 22'; Hagel 55', 57'; Corley 60'	Report	Wienroither 38' (o.g.)	Stadium: Dietmar-Hopp-Stadion; Referee: Maria Marotta (Italy)

==== Knockout phase ====
===== Quarter-finals =====
23 March 2022 First leg	Arsenal (England)	1–1	(Germany) Wolfsburg	Holloway
20:00 GMT	Mead (yellow card) 68'; Catley (yellow card) 76'; Wubben-Moy 89'	Report	Waßmuth 19'; Rauch (yellow card) 43'; Popp (yellow card) 57'; Wedemeyer (yellow card) 90+2'	Stadium: Emirates Stadium; Attendance: 5,018; Referee: Jana Adámková

31 March 2022 Second leg	Wolfsburg (Germany)	2–0 (3–1 agg.)	(England) Arsenal	Wolfsburg
17:45 GMT	Roord 9'; Williamson 72' (o.g.)	Report		Stadium: Volkswagen Arena; Attendance: 11,293; Referee: Ivana Projkovska

== Personal Awards ==
=== Arsenal Women Player of the Season ===
- First place: Beth Mead
- Second place: Leah Williamson
- Third place: Vivianne Miedema

=== Arsenal Women Goal of the Season ===
- First place: Katie McCabe (against Liverpool F.C. Women)
- Second place: Katie McCabe (against Aston Villa W.F.C.)
- Third place: Beth Mead (against Chelsea F.C. Women)

=== BBC Women's Footballer of the Year ===
- Vivianne Miedema

=== Football Supporters' Association Women's Player of the Year ===
- Vivianne Miedema

=== FIFA FIFPRO Women's World 11 ===
- Vivianne Miedema

=== Monthly awards ===
==== FA WSL Player of the Month ====
- Beth Mead, September 2021
- Katie McCabe, October 2021

==== PFA Fans' Player of the Month ====
- Beth Mead, November 2021

==== FA WSL Goal of the Month ====
- Katie McCabe, October 2021

==== FA WSL Manager of the Month ====
- Jonas Eidevall, September 2021
- Jonas Eidevall, October 2021

==== Arsenal Goal of the Month award ====
The Goal of the Month awards were chosen via open-access polls on the club's official website and include contenders from both the men's and women's teams.

Month	Player	Competition	Opponent	Votes	Ref
October	Katie McCabe (IRL)	WSL	Aston Villa	22.1%	
January	Beth Mead (ENG)	WSL	Brighton & Hove Albion	44%	

Note: The other Goal of the Month awards were won by players on the men's team.

== See also ==
- List of Arsenal W.F.C. seasons
- 2021–22 in English football
