= 2021–22 in French football =

Football in France
- Season: 2021–22

Men's football
- Ligue 1: Paris Saint-Germain
- Ligue 2: Toulouse
- Championnat National: Laval
- Coupe de France: Nantes
- Trophée des Champions: Lille

Women's football
- Division 1: Lyon
- Coupe de France: Paris Saint-Germain

The following article is a summary of the 2021–22 football season in France, which was the 88th season of competitive football in the country and ran from July 2021 to June 2022.

== National team ==
=== France national football team ===
==== Friendlies ====
| 25 March 2022 | France | 2–1 | Ivory Coast | Marseille, France |
| 21:15 | Giroud 22'; Tchouaméni 90+3' | Report | Pépé 19' | Stadium: Stade Vélodrome; Referee: Vítor Ferreira (Portugal) |

| 29 March 2022 | France | 5–0 | South Africa | Villeneuve d'Ascq, France |
| 21:15 | Mbappé 23', 76' (pen.); Giroud 34'; Ben Yedder 81'; Guendouzi 90+2' | Report | | Stadium: Stade Pierre-Mauroy; Referee: Sandro Schärer (Switzerland) |

==== 2022 FIFA World Cup qualification ====
===== Group D =====
| Pos | Team | Pld | W | D | L | GF | GA | GD | Pts | Qualification | France | Ukraine | Finland | Bosnia and Herzegovina | Kazakhstan |
|---|---|---|---|---|---|---|---|---|---|---|---|---|---|---|---|
| 1 | France | 8 | 5 | 3 | 0 | 18 | 3 | +15 | 18 | Qualification for 2022 FIFA World Cup | — | 1–1 | 2–0 | 1–1 | 8–0 |
| 2 | Ukraine | 8 | 2 | 6 | 0 | 11 | 8 | +3 | 12 | Advance to play-offs | 1–1 | — | 1–1 | 1–1 | 1–1 |
| 3 | Finland | 8 | 3 | 2 | 3 | 10 | 10 | 0 | 11 | | 0–2 | 1–2 | — | 2–2 | 1–0 |
| 4 | Bosnia and Herzegovina | 8 | 1 | 4 | 3 | 9 | 12 | −3 | 7 | | 0–1 | 0–2 | 1–3 | — | 2–2 |
| 5 | Kazakhstan | 8 | 0 | 3 | 5 | 5 | 20 | −15 | 3 | | 0–2 | 2–2 | 0–2 | 0–2 | — |

Source: FIFA, UEFA
Rules for classification: Tiebreakers

| 1 September 2021 | France | 1–1 | Bosnia and Herzegovina | Strasbourg, France |
| 20:45 CEST (UTC+2) | Griezmann 40' | Report | Džeko 36' | Stadium: Stade de la Meinau; Attendance: 21,754; Referee: Sandro Schärer (Switzerland) |

| 4 September 2021 | Ukraine | 1–1 | France | Kyiv, Ukraine |
| 20:45 | Shaparenko 44' | Report | Martial 51' | Stadium: NSK Olimpiyskiy; Attendance: 48,000; Referee: Slavko Vinčić (Slovenia) |

| 7 September 2021 | France | 2–0 | Finland | Décines-Charpieu, France |
| 20:45 CEST (UTC+2) | Griezmann 25', 53' | Report | | Stadium: Groupama Stadium; Referee: Deniz Aytekin (Germany) |

| 13 November 2021 | France | 8–0 | Kazakhstan | Paris, France |
| 20:45 | Mbappé 6', 12', 32', 87'; Benzema 55', 59'; Rabiot 75'; Griezmann 84' (pen.) | Report | | Stadium: Parc des Princes; Attendance: 45,551; Referee: Glenn Nyberg (Sweden) |

| 16 November 2021 | Finland | 0–2 | France | Helsinki, Finland |
| 20:45 | | Report | Benzema 66'; Mbappé 76' | Stadium: Helsinki Olympic Stadium; Referee: Marco Guida (Italy) |

==== 2021 UEFA Nations League Finals ====
| 7 October 2021 2021 UEFA Nations League SF | Belgium | 2–3 | France | Turin, Italy |
| 20:45 | Carrasco 37'; Lukaku 40' | Report | Benzema 62'; Mbappé 69' (pen.); T. Hernandez 90' | Stadium: Juventus Stadium; Attendance: 12,409; Referee: Daniel Siebert (Germany) |

===== Final =====
10 October 2021
20:45

| Spain | 1–2 | France |
|---|---|---|
| Oyarzabal 64' | Report | Benzema 66'; Mbappé 80' |

San Siro, Milan
Attendance: 31,511
Referee: Anthony Taylor (England)

==== UEFA Nations League ====
===== Group 1 =====
| Pos | Team | Pld | W | D | L | GF | GA | GD | Pts | Qualification or relegation | (Croatia) | (Denmark) | (France) | (Austria) |
|---|---|---|---|---|---|---|---|---|---|---|---|---|---|---|
| 1 | Croatia | 6 | 4 | 1 | 1 | 8 | 6 | +2 | 13 | Qualification for Nations League Finals | — | 2–1 | 1–1 | 0–3 |
| 2 | Denmark | 6 | 4 | 0 | 2 | 9 | 5 | +4 | 12 | | 0–1 | — | 2–0 | 2–0 |
| 3 | France | 6 | 1 | 2 | 3 | 5 | 7 | −2 | 5 | | 0–1 | 1–2 | — | 2–0 |
| 4 | Austria (R) | 6 | 1 | 1 | 4 | 6 | 10 | −4 | 4 | Relegation to League B | 1–3 | 1–2 | 1–1 | — |

Source: UEFA
(R) Relegated

| 3 June 2022 | France | 1–2 | Denmark | Saint-Denis, France |
| 20:45 CEST (UTC+2) | Benzema 51' | Report | Cornelius 68', 88' | Stadium: Stade de France; Attendance: 75,833; Referee: Felix Zwayer (Germany) |

| 6 June 2022 | Croatia | 1–1 | France | Split, Croatia |
| 20:45 CEST (UTC+2) | Kramarić 83' (pen.) | Report | Rabiot 52' | Stadium: Stadion Poljud; Attendance: 30,000; Referee: Marco Guida (Italy) |

| 10 June 2022 | Austria | 1–1 | France | Vienna, Austria |
| 20:45 CEST (UTC+2) | Weimann 37' | Report | Mbappé 83' | Stadium: Ernst-Happel-Stadion; Attendance: 44,800; Referee: Anastasios Sidiropoulos (Greece) |

| 13 June 2022 | France | 0–1 | Croatia | Saint-Denis, France |
| 20:45 CEST (UTC+2) | | Report | Modrić 5' (pen.) | Stadium: Stade de France; Attendance: 77,410; Referee: Orel Grinfeld (Israel) |

=== France national under-23 football team ===
==== Summer Olympics ====
Due to the COVID-19 pandemic, the games have been postponed to the summer of 2021. However, their official name remains 2020 Summer Olympics with the rescheduled 2021 dates have yet to be announced.

===== Group A =====
| Pos | Team | Pld | W | D | L | GF | GA | GD | Pts | Qualification |
|---|---|---|---|---|---|---|---|---|---|---|
| 1 | Japan (H) | 3 | 3 | 0 | 0 | 7 | 1 | +6 | 9 | Advance to knockout stage |
| 2 | Mexico | 3 | 2 | 0 | 1 | 8 | 3 | +5 | 6 | Advance to knockout stage |
| 3 | France | 3 | 1 | 0 | 2 | 5 | 11 | −6 | 3 | |
| 4 | South Africa | 3 | 0 | 0 | 3 | 3 | 8 | −5 | 0 | |

Source: TOCOG and FIFA
Rules for classification: Group stage tiebreakers
(H) Hosts

| 22 July 2021 | Mexico | 4–1 | France | Tokyo, Japan |
| | Vega 47'; Córdova 55'; Antuna 80'; Aguirre 90+1' | Report | Gignac 69' (pen.) | Stadium: Tokyo Stadium; Attendance: 0 Referee: Chris Beath (Australia) |

| 25 July 2021 | France | 4–3 | South Africa | Saitama, Japan |
| | Gignac 57', 78', 86' (pen.); Savanier 90+3' | Report | Kodisang 53'; Makgopa 73'; Mokoena 82' | Stadium: Saitama Stadium 2002; Referee: Kevin Ortega (Peru) |

| 28 July 2021 | France | 0–4 | Japan | Yokohama, Japan |
| | | Report | Kubo 27'; Sakai 34'; Miyoshi 70'; Maeda 90+1' | Stadium: International Stadium Yokohama; Referee: Iván Barton (El Salvador) |

=== France women's national football team ===
==== Friendlies ====
| 25 June 2022 | France | 4–0 | Cameroon | Beauvais, France |
| 21:10 | | Report | | Stadium: Stade Pierre Brisson |

==== 2023 FIFA Women's World Cup qualification ====
===== Group I =====
| Pos | Team | Pld | W | D | L | GF | GA | GD | Pts | Qualification | (France) | (Wales) | (Slovenia) | (Greece) | (Estonia) | (Kazakhstan) |
|---|---|---|---|---|---|---|---|---|---|---|---|---|---|---|---|---|
| 1 | France | 10 | 10 | 0 | 0 | 54 | 4 | +50 | 30 | 2023 FIFA Women's World Cup | — | 2–0 | 1–0 | 5–1 | 11–0 | 6–0 |
| 2 | Wales | 10 | 6 | 2 | 2 | 22 | 5 | +17 | 20 | Play-offs | 1–2 | — | 0–0 | 5–0 | 4–0 | 6–0 |
| 3 | Slovenia | 10 | 5 | 3 | 2 | 21 | 6 | +15 | 18 | | 2–3 | 1–1 | — | 0–0 | 6–0 | 2–0 |
| 4 | Greece | 10 | 4 | 1 | 5 | 12 | 28 | −16 | 13 | | 0–10 | 0–1 | 1–4 | — | 3–0 | 3–2 |
| 5 | Estonia | 10 | 2 | 0 | 8 | 7 | 43 | −36 | 6 | | 0–9 | 0–1 | 0–4 | 1–3 | — | 4–2 |
| 6 | Kazakhstan | 10 | 0 | 0 | 10 | 4 | 34 | −30 | 0 | | 0–5 | 0–3 | 0–2 | 0–1 | 0–2 | — |

Source: UEFA
Rules for classification: Tiebreakers

| 17 September 2021 2023 Women's World Cup qualification | Greece | 0–10 | France | Patras, Greece |
| | | Report | Majri 14'; Geyoro 15', 40'; Katoto 18', 25', 53'; Palama 30' (o.g.); Diani 38'; Asseyi 65'; Renard 90+2' (pen.) | Stadium: Pampeloponnisiako Stadium; Referee: Anastasia Pustovoitova (Russia) |

| 21 September 2021 2023 Women's World Cup qualification | Slovenia | 2–3 | France | Murska Sobota, Slovenia |
| | Prašnikar 20'; Zver 88' (pen.) | Report | Katoto 28', 60'; Majri 90+4' (pen.) | Stadium: Fazanerija City Stadium; Referee: Riem Hussein (Germany) |

| 22 October 2021 2023 Women's World Cup qualification | France | 11–0 | Estonia | Créteil |
| | Geyoro 5'; Katoto 15'; Périsset 25' (pen.); Cascarino 29'; Toletti 45'; Orav 52' (o.g.); Diani 53'; Tounkara 65', 72'; Saar 79' (o.g.); Dali 90' | Report | | Stadium: Stade Dominique Duvauchelle; Referee: Abigail Marriott (England) |

| 26 October 2021 2023 Women's World Cup qualification | Kazakhstan | 0–5 | France | Nur-Sultan |
| | | Report | Katoto 9', 23'; Dali 17'; Malard 38', 54' | Stadium: Astana Arena |

| 26 November 2021 2023 Women's World Cup qualification | France | 6–0 | Kazakhstan | Vannes |
| | Asseyi 5'; Cascarino 9'; Katoto 24'; Périsset 37'; Gauvin 72' (pen.); Diani 74' | Report | | Stadium: Stade de la Rabine; Referee: Silvia Domingos (Portugal) |

| 30 November 2021 2023 Women's World Cup qualification | France | 2–0 | Wales | Guingamp |
| | Diani 45+2'; Bacha 90' | Report | | Stadium: Stade du Roudourou; Referee: Iuliana Demetrescu (Romania) |

| 8 April 2022 2023 Women's World Cup qualification | Wales | 1–2 | France | Llanelli |
| 21:10 | Ingle 71' | Report | Renard 31'; Katoto 57' | Stadium: Parc y Scarlets; Referee: Jana Adámková (Czech Republic) |

| 12 April 2022 2023 Women's World Cup qualification | France | 1–0 | Slovenia | Le Mans |
| 21:10 | Cascarino 47' | Report | | Stadium: MMArena; Referee: Sandra Braz (Portugal) |

==== 2022 Tournoi de France ====
| Pos | Team | Pld | W | D | L | GF | GA | GD | Pts |
|---|---|---|---|---|---|---|---|---|---|
| 1 | France (H, C) | 3 | 3 | 0 | 0 | 10 | 2 | +8 | 9 |
| 2 | Netherlands | 3 | 1 | 1 | 1 | 5 | 4 | +1 | 4 |
| 3 | Brazil | 3 | 0 | 2 | 1 | 2 | 3 | −1 | 2 |
| 4 | Finland | 3 | 0 | 1 | 2 | 0 | 8 | −8 | 1 |

Source: Soccerway
Rules for classification: 1) points; 2) goal difference; 3) goals scored; 4) head-to-head result; 5) fair play ranking.
(C) Champions; (H) Hosts

| 16 February 2022 Tournoi de France | France | 5–0 | Finland | Le Havre |
| | Westerlund 12' (o.g.); Malard 16'; Renard 34', 89'; Geyoro 57' | Report | | Stadium: Stade Océane; Referee: Eszter Urbán (Hungary) |

| 19 February 2022 Tournoi de France | France | 2–1 | Brazil | Caen |
| | Katoto 23', 59' | Report | Marta 19' (pen.) | Stadium: Stade Michel d'Ornano; Attendance: 12,050; Referee: Esther Staubli (Switzerland) |

| 22 February 2022 Tournoi de France | France | 3–1 | Netherlands | Le Havre |
| 21:10 | Renard 20' (pen.); Katoto 25', 74' | Report | Beerensteyn 50' | Stadium: Stade Océane; Attendance: 5,231; Referee: Marta Huerta de Aza (Spain) |

== UEFA competitions ==
=== UEFA Champions League ===
==== Qualifying rounds ====
===== Third qualifying round =====
| Team 1 | Agg. | Team 2 | 1st leg | 2nd leg |
|---|---|---|---|---|
| Sparta Prague (Czech Republic) | 1–5 | (France) Monaco | 0–2 | 1–3 |

===== Play-off round =====
| Team 1 | Agg. | Team 2 | 1st leg | 2nd leg |
|---|---|---|---|---|
| Monaco (France) | 2–3 | (Ukraine) Shakhtar Donetsk | 0–1 | 2–2 (a.e.t.) |

==== Group stage ====
===== Group A =====
| Pos | Team | Pld | W | D | L | GF | GA | GD | Pts | Qualification | MCI | PAR | RBL | BRU |
|---|---|---|---|---|---|---|---|---|---|---|---|---|---|---|
| 1 | (England) Manchester City | 6 | 4 | 0 | 2 | 18 | 10 | +8 | 12 | Advance to knockout phase | — | 2–1 | 6–3 | 4–1 |
| 2 | (France) Paris Saint-Germain | 6 | 3 | 2 | 1 | 13 | 8 | +5 | 11 | Advance to knockout phase | 2–0 | — | 3–2 | 4–1 |
| 3 | (Germany) RB Leipzig | 6 | 2 | 1 | 3 | 15 | 14 | +1 | 7 | Transfer to Europa League | 2–1 | 2–2 | — | 1–2 |
| 4 | (Belgium) Club Brugge | 6 | 1 | 1 | 4 | 6 | 20 | −14 | 4 | | 1–5 | 1–1 | 0–5 | — |

Source: UEFA

===== Group G =====
| Pos | Team | Pld | W | D | L | GF | GA | GD | Pts | Qualification | LIL | SAL | SEV | WOL |
|---|---|---|---|---|---|---|---|---|---|---|---|---|---|---|
| 1 | (France) Lille | 6 | 3 | 2 | 1 | 7 | 4 | +3 | 11 | Advance to knockout phase | — | 1–0 | 0–0 | 0–0 |
| 2 | (Austria) Red Bull Salzburg | 6 | 3 | 1 | 2 | 8 | 6 | +2 | 10 | Advance to knockout phase | 2–1 | — | 1–0 | 3–1 |
| 3 | (Spain) Sevilla | 6 | 1 | 3 | 2 | 5 | 5 | 0 | 6 | Transfer to Europa League | 1–2 | 1–1 | — | 2–0 |
| 4 | (Germany) VfL Wolfsburg | 6 | 1 | 2 | 3 | 5 | 10 | −5 | 5 | | 1–3 | 2–1 | 1–1 | — |

Source: UEFA

==== Knockout phase ====
===== Round of 16 =====
| Team 1 | Agg. | Team 2 | 1st leg | 2nd leg |
|---|---|---|---|---|
| Chelsea (England) | 4–1 | (France) Lille | 2–0 | 2–1 |
| Paris Saint-Germain (France) | 2–3 | (Spain) Real Madrid | 1–0 | 1–3 |

=== UEFA Europa League ===
==== Group stage ====
===== Group A =====
| Pos | Team | Pld | W | D | L | GF | GA | GD | Pts | Qualification | LYO | RAN | SPP | BRO |
|---|---|---|---|---|---|---|---|---|---|---|---|---|---|---|
| 1 | (France) Lyon | 6 | 5 | 1 | 0 | 16 | 5 | +11 | 16 | Advance to round of 16 | — | 1–1 | 3–0 | 3–0 |
| 2 | (Scotland) Rangers | 6 | 2 | 2 | 2 | 6 | 5 | +1 | 8 | Advance to knockout round play-offs | 0–2 | — | 2–0 | 2–0 |
| 3 | (Czech Republic) Sparta Prague | 6 | 2 | 1 | 3 | 6 | 9 | −3 | 7 | Transfer to Europa Conference League | 3–4 | 1–0 | — | 2–0 |
| 4 | (Denmark) Brøndby | 6 | 0 | 2 | 4 | 2 | 11 | −9 | 2 | | 1–3 | 1–1 | 0–0 | — |

Source: UEFA

===== Group B =====
| Pos | Team | Pld | W | D | L | GF | GA | GD | Pts | Qualification | MON | RSO | PSV | STU |
|---|---|---|---|---|---|---|---|---|---|---|---|---|---|---|
| 1 | (France) Monaco | 6 | 3 | 3 | 0 | 7 | 4 | +3 | 12 | Advance to round of 16 | — | 2–1 | 0–0 | 1–0 |
| 2 | (Spain) Real Sociedad | 6 | 2 | 3 | 1 | 9 | 6 | +3 | 9 | Advance to knockout round play-offs | 1–1 | — | 3–0 | 1–1 |
| 3 | (Netherlands) PSV Eindhoven | 6 | 2 | 2 | 2 | 9 | 8 | +1 | 8 | Transfer to Europa Conference League | 1–2 | 2–2 | — | 2–0 |
| 4 | (Austria) Sturm Graz | 6 | 0 | 2 | 4 | 3 | 10 | −7 | 2 | | 1–1 | 0–1 | 1–4 | — |

Source: UEFA

===== Group E =====
| Pos | Team | Pld | W | D | L | GF | GA | GD | Pts | Qualification | GAL | LAZ | MAR | LOK |
|---|---|---|---|---|---|---|---|---|---|---|---|---|---|---|
| 1 | (Turkey) Galatasaray | 6 | 3 | 3 | 0 | 7 | 3 | +4 | 12 | Advance to round of 16 | — | 1–0 | 4–2 | 1–1 |
| 2 | (Italy) Lazio | 6 | 2 | 3 | 1 | 7 | 3 | +4 | 9 | Advance to knockout round play-offs | 0–0 | — | 0–0 | 2–0 |
| 3 | (France) Marseille | 6 | 1 | 4 | 1 | 6 | 7 | −1 | 7 | Transfer to Europa Conference League | 0–0 | 2–2 | — | 1–0 |
| 4 | (Russia) Lokomotiv Moscow | 6 | 0 | 2 | 4 | 2 | 9 | −7 | 2 | | 0–1 | 0–3 | 1–1 | — |

Source: UEFA

==== Knockout phase ====
===== Round of 16 =====
| Team 1 | Agg. | Team 2 | 1st leg | 2nd leg |
|---|---|---|---|---|
| Braga (Portugal) | 3–1 | (France) Monaco | 2–0 | 1–1 |
| Porto (Portugal) | 1–2 | (France) Lyon | 0–1 | 1–1 |

===== Quarter-finals =====
| Team 1 | Agg. | Team 2 | 1st leg | 2nd leg |
|---|---|---|---|---|
| West Ham United (England) | 4–1 | (France) Lyon | 1–1 | 3–0 |

=== UEFA Europa Conference League ===
==== Qualifying phase and play-off round ====
===== Play-off round =====
| Team 1 | Agg. | Team 2 | 1st leg | 2nd leg |
|---|---|---|---|---|
| Rennes (France) | 5–1 | (Norway) Rosenborg | 2–0 | 3–1 |

==== Group stage ====
===== Group G =====
| Pos | Team | Pld | W | D | L | GF | GA | GD | Pts | Qualification | REN | VIT | TOT | MUR |
|---|---|---|---|---|---|---|---|---|---|---|---|---|---|---|
| 1 | (France) Rennes | 6 | 4 | 2 | 0 | 13 | 7 | +6 | 14 | Advance to round of 16 | — | 3–3 | 2–2 | 1–0 |
| 2 | (Netherlands) Vitesse | 6 | 3 | 1 | 2 | 12 | 9 | +3 | 10 | Advance to knockout round play-offs | 1–2 | — | 1–0 | 3–1 |
| 3 | (England) Tottenham Hotspur | 6 | 2 | 1 | 3 | 11 | 11 | 0 | 7 | | 0–3 (Note: The Tottenham Hotspur v Rennes match was awarded as a 3–0 win to Rennes due to numerous positive COVID-19 tests in the Tottenham Hotspur squad.) | 3–2 | — | 5–1 |
| 4 | (Slovenia) Mura | 6 | 1 | 0 | 5 | 5 | 14 | −9 | 3 | | 1–2 | 0–2 | 2–1 | — |

Source: UEFA

==== Knockout phase ====
===== Knockout round play-offs =====
| Team 1 | Agg. | Team 2 | 1st leg | 2nd leg |
|---|---|---|---|---|
| Marseille (France) | 6–1 | (Azerbaijan) Qarabağ | 3–1 | 3–0 |

===== Round of 16 =====
| Team 1 | Agg. | Team 2 | 1st leg | 2nd leg |
|---|---|---|---|---|
| Marseille (France) | 6–1 | (Azerbaijan) Qarabağ | 3–1 | 3–0 |
| Leicester City (England) | 3–2 | (France) Rennes | 2–0 | 1–2 |

===== Quarter-finals =====
| Team 1 | Agg. | Team 2 | 1st leg | 2nd leg |
|---|---|---|---|---|
| Marseille (France) | 3–1 | (Greece) PAOK | 2–1 | 1–0 |

===== Semi-finals =====
| Team 1 | Agg. | Team 2 | 1st leg | 2nd leg |
|---|---|---|---|---|
| Feyenoord (Netherlands) | 3–2 | (France) Marseille | 3–2 | 0–0 |

=== UEFA Youth League ===
==== UEFA Champions League Path ====
===== Group A =====
| Pos | Team | Pld | W | D | L | GF | GA | GD | Pts | Qualification | PAR | BRU | MCI | RBL |
|---|---|---|---|---|---|---|---|---|---|---|---|---|---|---|
| 1 | (France) Paris Saint-Germain | 6 | 4 | 2 | 0 | 16 | 7 | +9 | 14 | Round of 16 | — | 3–2 | 1–1 | 3–0 |
| 2 | (Belgium) Club Brugge | 6 | 3 | 2 | 1 | 18 | 11 | +7 | 11 | Play-offs | 2–2 | — | 1–1 | 4–1 |
| 3 | (England) Manchester City | 6 | 2 | 2 | 2 | 12 | 11 | +1 | 8 | | 1–3 | 3–5 | — | 5–1 |
| 4 | (Germany) RB Leipzig | 6 | 0 | 0 | 6 | 4 | 21 | −17 | 0 | | 1–4 | 1–4 | 0–1 | — |

Source: UEFA

===== Group G =====
| Pos | Team | Pld | W | D | L | GF | GA | GD | Pts | Qualification | SAL | SEV | LIL | WOL |
|---|---|---|---|---|---|---|---|---|---|---|---|---|---|---|
| 1 | (Austria) Red Bull Salzburg | 6 | 4 | 0 | 2 | 10 | 5 | +5 | 12 | Round of 16 | — | 2–0 | 3–1 | 3–0 |
| 2 | (Spain) Sevilla | 6 | 3 | 2 | 1 | 8 | 3 | +5 | 11 | Play-offs | 2–0 | — | 0–0 | 2–0 |
| 3 | (France) Lille | 6 | 3 | 1 | 2 | 7 | 6 | +1 | 10 | | 1–0 | 0–3 | — | 2–0 |
| 4 | (Germany) VfL Wolfsburg | 6 | 0 | 1 | 5 | 2 | 13 | −11 | 1 | | 1–2 | 1–1 | 0–3 | — |

Source: UEFA

==== Domestic Champions Path ====
===== First round =====
| Team 1 | Agg. | Team 2 | 1st leg | 2nd leg |
|---|---|---|---|---|
| Miercurea Ciuc (Romania) | 0–5 | (France) Angers | 0–2 | 0–3 |

===== Second round =====
| Team 1 | Agg. | Team 2 | 1st leg | 2nd leg |
|---|---|---|---|---|
| Angers (France) | 1–1 (4–5 p) | (Netherlands) AZ | 0–1 | 1–0 |

==== Play-offs ====
===== Round of 16 =====
| Team 1 | Score | Team 2 |
|---|---|---|
| Paris Saint-Germain (France) | 2–0 | (Spain) Sevilla |

===== Quarter-finals =====
| Team 1 | Score | Team 2 |
|---|---|---|
| Paris Saint-Germain (France) | 1–3 | (Austria) Red Bull Salzburg |

=== UEFA Women's Champions League ===
==== Qualifying rounds ====
===== Round 1 =====
====== Semi-finals ======
| Team 1 | Score | Team 2 |
|---|---|---|
| Bordeaux (France) | 2–1 | (Scotland) Celtic |

====== Final / Third-place play-off ======
| Team 1 | Score | Team 2 |
|---|---|---|
| Bordeaux (France) | 3–1 | (Sweden) Kristianstad |

===== Round 2 =====
| Team 1 | Agg. | Team 2 | 1st leg | 2nd leg |
|---|---|---|---|---|
| Levante (Spain) | 2–4 | (France) Lyon | 1–2 | 1–2 |
| VfL Wolfsburg (Germany) | 5–5 (3–0 p) | (France) Bordeaux | 3–2 | 2–3 (a.e.t.) |

==== Group stage ====
===== Group B =====
| Pos | Team | Pld | W | D | L | GF | GA | GD | Pts | Qualification | PSG | RMA | KHA | BRE |
|---|---|---|---|---|---|---|---|---|---|---|---|---|---|---|
| 1 | (France) Paris Saint-Germain | 6 | 6 | 0 | 0 | 25 | 0 | +25 | 18 | Advance to Quarter-finals | — | 4–0 | 5–0 | 6–0 |
| 2 | (Spain) Real Madrid | 6 | 4 | 0 | 2 | 12 | 6 | +6 | 12 | Advance to Quarter-finals | 0–2 | — | 3–0 | 5–0 |
| 3 | (Ukraine) Zhytlobud-1 Kharkiv | 6 | 1 | 1 | 4 | 2 | 15 | −13 | 4 | | 0–6 | 0–1 | — | 0–0 |
| 4 | (Iceland) Breiðablik | 6 | 0 | 1 | 5 | 0 | 18 | −18 | 1 | | 0–2 | 0–3 | 0–2 | — |

Source: UEFA

===== Group D =====
| Pos | Team | Pld | W | D | L | GF | GA | GD | Pts | Qualification | LYO | BAY | BEN | HAK |
|---|---|---|---|---|---|---|---|---|---|---|---|---|---|---|
| 1 | (France) Lyon | 6 | 5 | 0 | 1 | 19 | 2 | +17 | 15 | Advance to Quarter-finals | — | 2–1 | 5–0 | 4–0 |
| 2 | (Germany) Bayern Munich | 6 | 4 | 1 | 1 | 15 | 3 | +12 | 13 | Advance to Quarter-finals | 1–0 | — | 4–0 | 4–0 |
| 3 | (Portugal) Benfica | 6 | 1 | 1 | 4 | 2 | 16 | −14 | 4 | | 0–5 | 0–0 | — | 0–1 |
| 4 | (Sweden) BK Häcken | 6 | 1 | 0 | 5 | 3 | 18 | −15 | 3 | | 0–3 | 1–5 | 1–2 | — |

Source: UEFA

==== Knockout phase ====
===== Quarter-finals =====
| Team 1 | Agg. | Team 2 | 1st leg | 2nd leg |
|---|---|---|---|---|
| Bayern Munich (Germany) | 3–4 | (France) Paris Saint-Germain | 1–2 | 2–2 (a.e.t.) |
| Juventus (Italy) | 3–4 | (France) Lyon | 2–1 | 1–3 |

===== Semi-finals =====
| Team 1 | Agg. | Team 2 | 1st leg | 2nd leg |
|---|---|---|---|---|
| Lyon (France) | 5–3 | (France) Paris Saint-Germain | 3–2 | 2–1 |

===== Final =====
21 May 2022
19:00 UTC+2

| Barcelona (Spain) | 1–3 | (France) Lyon |
|---|---|---|
| Putellas 41' | Report | Henry 6'; Hegerberg 23'; Macario 33' |

Juventus Stadium, Turin
Attendance: 32,257
Referee: Lina Lehtovaara (Finland)

== League season ==
=== Men ===
==== Ligue 1 ====
| Pos | Team | Pld | W | D | L | GF | GA | GD | Pts | Qualification or relegation |
|---|---|---|---|---|---|---|---|---|---|---|
| 1 | Paris Saint-Germain (C) | 38 | 26 | 8 | 4 | 90 | 36 | +54 | 86 | Qualification for the Champions League group stage |
| 2 | Marseille | 38 | 21 | 8 | 9 | 63 | 38 | +25 | 71 | Qualification for the Champions League group stage |
| 3 | Monaco | 38 | 20 | 9 | 9 | 65 | 40 | +25 | 69 | Qualification for the Champions League third qualifying round |
| 4 | Rennes | 38 | 20 | 6 | 12 | 82 | 40 | +42 | 66 | Qualification for the Europa League group stage |
| 5 | Nice | 38 | 20 | 7 | 11 | 52 | 36 | +16 | 66 (Note: Nice were deducted one point for uncontrolled crowd trouble that caused the abandonment of their match against Marseille.) | Qualification for the Europa Conference League play-off round |
| 6 | Strasbourg | 38 | 17 | 12 | 9 | 60 | 43 | +17 | 63 | |
| 7 | Lens | 38 | 17 | 11 | 10 | 62 | 48 | +14 | 62 | |
| 8 | Lyon | 38 | 17 | 11 | 10 | 66 | 51 | +15 | 61 (Note: Lyon were deducted one point for uncontrolled crowd trouble that caused the abandonment of their match against Marseille.) | |
| 9 | Nantes | 38 | 15 | 10 | 13 | 55 | 48 | +7 | 55 | Qualification for the Europa League group stage (Note: Nantes qualified for the Europa League group stage as the 2021–22 Coupe de France winners.) |
| 10 | Lille | 38 | 14 | 13 | 11 | 48 | 48 | 0 | 55 | |
| 11 | Brest | 38 | 13 | 9 | 16 | 49 | 57 | −8 | 48 | |
| 12 | Reims | 38 | 11 | 13 | 14 | 43 | 44 | −1 | 46 | |
| 13 | Montpellier | 38 | 12 | 7 | 19 | 49 | 61 | −12 | 43 | |
| 14 | Angers | 38 | 10 | 11 | 17 | 44 | 55 | −11 | 41 | |
| 15 | Troyes | 38 | 9 | 11 | 18 | 37 | 53 | −16 | 38 | |
| 16 | Lorient | 38 | 8 | 12 | 18 | 35 | 63 | −28 | 36 | |
| 17 | Clermont | 38 | 9 | 9 | 20 | 38 | 69 | −31 | 36 | |
| 18 | Saint-Étienne (R) | 38 | 7 | 11 | 20 | 42 | 77 | −35 | 32 | Qualification for the relegation play-offs |
| 19 | Metz (R) | 38 | 6 | 13 | 19 | 35 | 69 | −34 | 31 | Relegation to Ligue 2 (Note: Bordeaux were initially relegated to Ligue 2. However, on 14 June it was decided by the DNCG to relegate Bordeaux administratively to the Championnat National for financial issues. On 27 July 2022, Bordeaux won its appeal and was officially maintained in Ligue 2 for the 2022–23 season.) |
| 20 | Bordeaux (R) | 38 | 6 | 13 | 19 | 52 | 91 | −39 | 31 | Relegation to Ligue 2 |

Source: Ligue 1
Rules for classification: 1) Points; 2) Goal difference; 3) Head-to-head points; 4) Head-to-head goal difference; 5) Head-to-head goals scored; 6) Head-to-head away goals scored; 7) Goals scored; 8) Away goals scored; 9) Fair-play points (Note: Head-to-head record is used only after all the matches between the teams in question have been played).
(C) Champions; (R) Relegated

==== Ligue 2 ====
| Pos | Team | Pld | W | D | L | GF | GA | GD | Pts | Promotion or Relegation |
|---|---|---|---|---|---|---|---|---|---|---|
| 1 | Toulouse (C, P) | 38 | 23 | 10 | 5 | 82 | 33 | +49 | 79 | Promotion to Ligue 1 |
| 2 | Ajaccio (P) | 38 | 22 | 9 | 7 | 39 | 19 | +20 | 75 | Promotion to Ligue 1 |
| 3 | Auxerre (O, P) | 38 | 21 | 11 | 6 | 61 | 39 | +22 | 74 | Qualification to promotion play-offs |
| 4 | Paris FC | 38 | 20 | 10 | 8 | 54 | 35 | +19 | 70 | Qualification to promotion play-offs |
| 5 | Sochaux | 38 | 19 | 11 | 8 | 47 | 34 | +13 | 68 | Qualification to promotion play-offs |
| 6 | Guingamp | 38 | 15 | 13 | 10 | 52 | 48 | +4 | 58 | |
| 7 | Caen | 38 | 13 | 11 | 14 | 51 | 42 | +9 | 50 | |
| 8 | Le Havre | 38 | 13 | 11 | 14 | 38 | 41 | −3 | 50 | |
| 9 | Nîmes | 38 | 14 | 7 | 17 | 44 | 51 | −7 | 49 | |
| 10 | Pau | 38 | 14 | 7 | 17 | 41 | 49 | −8 | 49 | |
| 11 | Dijon | 38 | 13 | 8 | 17 | 48 | 53 | −5 | 47 | |
| 12 | Bastia | 38 | 10 | 16 | 12 | 38 | 36 | +2 | 46 | |
| 13 | Niort | 38 | 12 | 10 | 16 | 39 | 42 | −3 | 46 | |
| 14 | Amiens | 38 | 9 | 17 | 12 | 43 | 41 | +2 | 44 | |
| 15 | Grenoble | 38 | 12 | 8 | 18 | 32 | 44 | −12 | 44 | |
| 16 | Valenciennes | 38 | 10 | 14 | 14 | 34 | 47 | −13 | 44 | |
| 17 | Rodez | 38 | 10 | 13 | 15 | 32 | 42 | −10 | 43 | |
| 18 | Quevilly-Rouen (O) | 38 | 10 | 10 | 18 | 33 | 50 | −17 | 40 | Qualification for the relegation play-offs |
| 19 | Dunkerque (R) | 38 | 8 | 7 | 23 | 28 | 53 | −25 | 31 | Relegation to Championnat National |
| 20 | Nancy (R) | 38 | 6 | 9 | 23 | 32 | 69 | −37 | 27 | Relegation to Championnat National |

Source: Ligue 2
Rules for classification: 1) Points; 2) Goal difference; 3) Number of goals scored; 4) Head-to-head goal difference; 5) Fair play points
(C) Champions; (O) Play-off winners; (P) Promoted; (R) Relegated

=== Women ===
==== Division 1 Féminine ====
| Pos | Team | Pld | W | D | L | GF | GA | GD | Pts | Qualification or relegation |
|---|---|---|---|---|---|---|---|---|---|---|
| 1 | Lyon (C) | 22 | 21 | 1 | 0 | 79 | 8 | +71 | 64 | Qualification for the Champions League group stage |
| 2 | Paris Saint-Germain | 22 | 17 | 2 | 3 | 68 | 12 | +56 | 53 | Qualification for the Champions League second round |
| 3 | Paris FC | 22 | 16 | 2 | 4 | 49 | 21 | +28 | 50 | Qualification for the Champions League first round |
| 4 | Fleury | 22 | 14 | 1 | 7 | 36 | 26 | +10 | 43 | |
| 5 | Montpellier | 22 | 11 | 2 | 9 | 38 | 25 | +13 | 35 | |
| 6 | Bordeaux | 22 | 11 | 2 | 9 | 38 | 29 | +9 | 35 | |
| 7 | Reims | 22 | 10 | 3 | 9 | 29 | 38 | −9 | 33 | |
| 8 | Guingamp | 22 | 4 | 5 | 13 | 23 | 57 | −34 | 17 | |
| 9 | Soyaux | 22 | 5 | 1 | 16 | 18 | 55 | −37 | 16 | |
| 10 | Dijon | 22 | 3 | 6 | 13 | 13 | 45 | −32 | 15 | |
| 11 | Issy (R) | 22 | 4 | 1 | 17 | 19 | 57 | −38 | 13 | Relegation to Division 2 Féminine |
| 12 | Saint-Étienne (R) | 22 | 1 | 4 | 17 | 17 | 54 | −37 | 7 | Relegation to Division 2 Féminine |

Source: Division 1 Féminine
Rules for classification: 1) points; 2) head-to-head points; 3) head-to-head goal difference; 4) goal difference; 5) goals scored
(C) Champions; (R) Relegated

== Cup competitions ==
=== 2021–22 Coupe de France ===
==== Final ====
7 May 2022
21:00 CEST

| Nice | 0–1 | Nantes |
|---|---|---|
| | Report | Blas 47' (pen.) |

Stade de France, Saint-Denis
Attendance: 78,961
Referee: Stéphanie Frappart

=== 2021 Trophée des Champions ===
1 August 2021
21:00 CEST

| Lille | 1–0 | Paris Saint-Germain |
|---|---|---|
| Xeka 45' | Report |

Bloomfield Stadium, Tel Aviv
Attendance: 29,000
Referee: Yigal Frid (Israel)

=== 2021–22 Coupe de France Féminine ===
15 May 2022

| Yzeure Allier | 0–8 | Paris Saint-Germain |
