= 2022 UEFA Women's Champions League final =

- Match programme cover
- Event: 2021–22 UEFA Women's Champions League
Barcelona	Lyon
(Spain)	(France)
1	3
- Date: 21 May 2022
- Venue: Juventus Stadium, Turin
- Player of the Match: Amandine Henry (Lyon)
- Referee: Lina Lehtovaara (Finland)
- Attendance: 32,257
- Weather: Sunny; 32 °C (90 °F); 43% humidity

The 2022 UEFA Women's Champions League final was the final match of the 2021–22 UEFA Women's Champions League, the 21st season of Europe's premier women's club football tournament organised by UEFA, and the 13th season since it was renamed from the UEFA Women's Cup to the UEFA Women's Champions League. The match was played at the Juventus Stadium in Turin, Italy on 21 May 2022, between Spanish club Barcelona and French club Lyon, a repeat of the 2019 final.

Lyon won the match 3–1 for their record-extending eighth UEFA Women's Champions League title.

== Teams ==
In the following table, finals until 2009 were in the UEFA Women's Cup era, since 2010 were in the UEFA Women's Champions League era.

Team	Previous finals appearances (bold indicates winners)
(Spain) Barcelona	2 (2019, **2021**)
(France) Lyon	9 (2010, **2011**, **2012**, 2013, **2016**, **2017**, **2018**, **2019**, **2020**)

== Venue ==
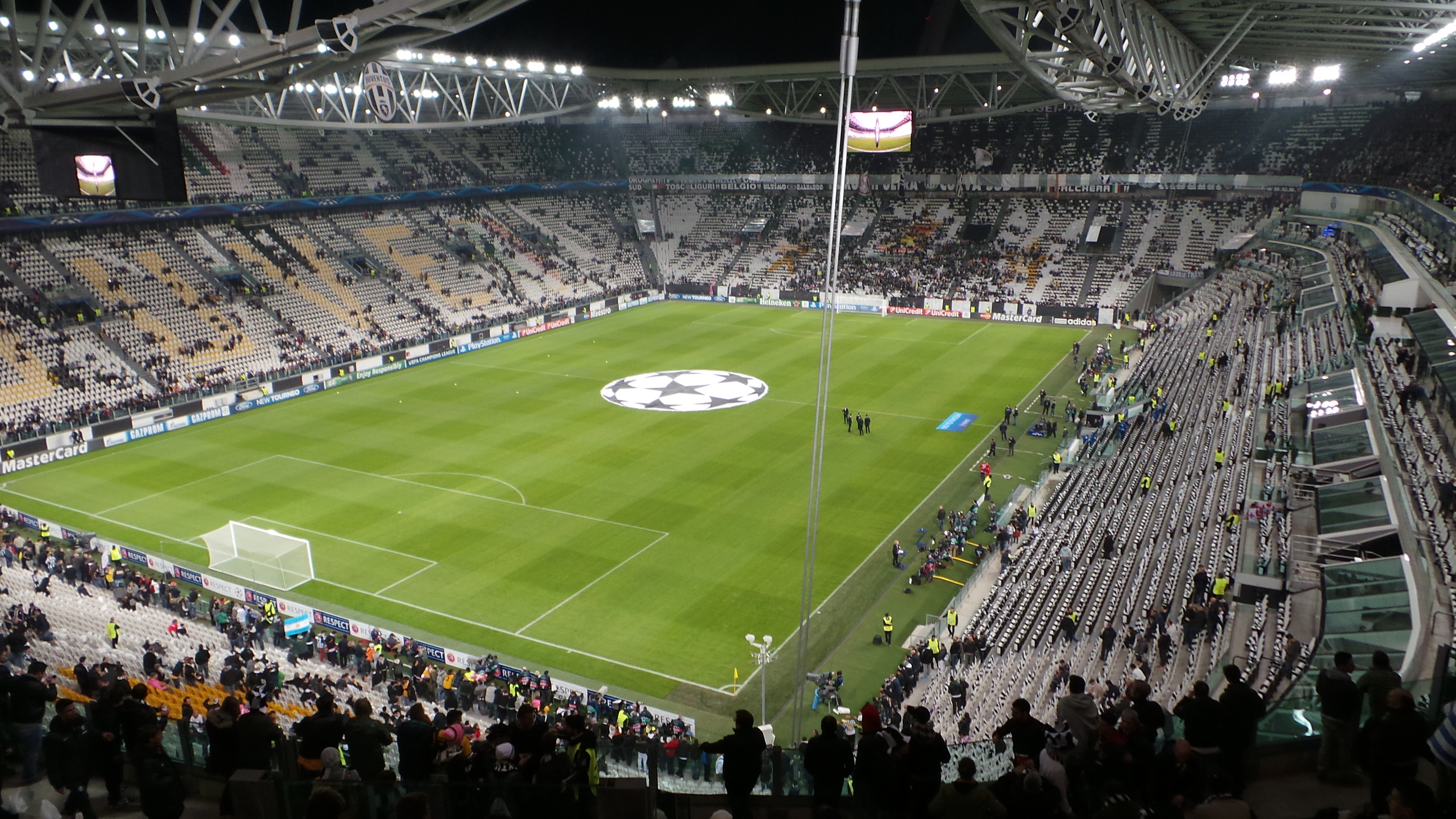
The Juventus Stadium in Turin hosted the final.

The Juventus Stadium was selected as the final host by the UEFA Executive Committee during their meeting in Amsterdam, Netherlands on 2 March 2020.

The match was the first UEFA Women's Cup/Champions League final to be held in Turin, and the second in Italy after the 2016 final, held in Reggio Emilia. The match was the second UEFA club competition final to be held at the stadium, having previously hosted the 2014 UEFA Europa League Final. It was also the seventh UEFA club competition final to be held in Turin, having hosted four other UEFA Cup/Europa League finals (holding a leg in 1977, 1990, 1992 and 1993), as well as the 1984 European Super Cup.

As the host federation, FIGC later announced that the 32,257 spectators in attendance generated €290,000 in stadium revenue (ticketing + hospitality), representing the highest-revenue women's sporting event in Italy to that point.

== Route to the final ==
Note: In all results below, the score of the finalist is given first (H: home; A: away).

(Spain) Barcelona				Round	(France) Lyon			
Opponent	Result			Group stage	Opponent	Result		
(England) Arsenal	4–1 (H)			Matchday 1	(Sweden) BK Häcken	3–0 (A)		
(Denmark) HB Køge	2–0 (A)			Matchday 2	(Portugal) Benfica	5–0 (H)		
(Germany) 1899 Hoffenheim	4–0 (H)			Matchday 3	(Germany) Bayern Munich	2–1 (H)		
(Germany) 1899 Hoffenheim	5–0 (A)			Matchday 4	(Germany) Bayern Munich	0–1 (A)		
(England) Arsenal	4–0 (A)			Matchday 5	(Portugal) Benfica	5–0 (A)		
(Denmark) HB Køge	5–0 (H)			Matchday 6	(Sweden) BK Häcken	4–0 (H)		
**Group C winners**: Pos / Team / Pld / Pts; **1** / (Spain) Barcelona / **6** / **18**; 2 / (England) Arsenal / 6 / **9**; 3 / (Germany) 1899 Hoffenheim / 6 / **9**; 4 / (Denmark) Køge / 6 / **0**; Source: UEFA				Final standings	**Group D winners**: Pos / Team / Pld / Pts; **1** / (France) Lyon / **6** / **15**; 2 / (Germany) Bayern Munich / 6 / **13**; 3 / (Portugal) Benfica / 6 / **4**; 4 / (Sweden) BK Häcken / 6 / **3**; Source: UEFA			
Opponent	Agg.	1st leg	2nd leg	Knockout phase	Opponent	Agg.	1st leg	2nd leg
(Spain) Real Madrid	8–3	3–1 (A)	5–2 (H)	Quarter-finals	(Italy) Juventus	4–3	1–2 (A)	3–1 (H)
(Germany) VfL Wolfsburg	5–3	5–1 (H)	0–2 (A)	Semi-finals	(France) Paris Saint-Germain	5–3	3–2 (H)	2–1 (A)

== Pre-match ==
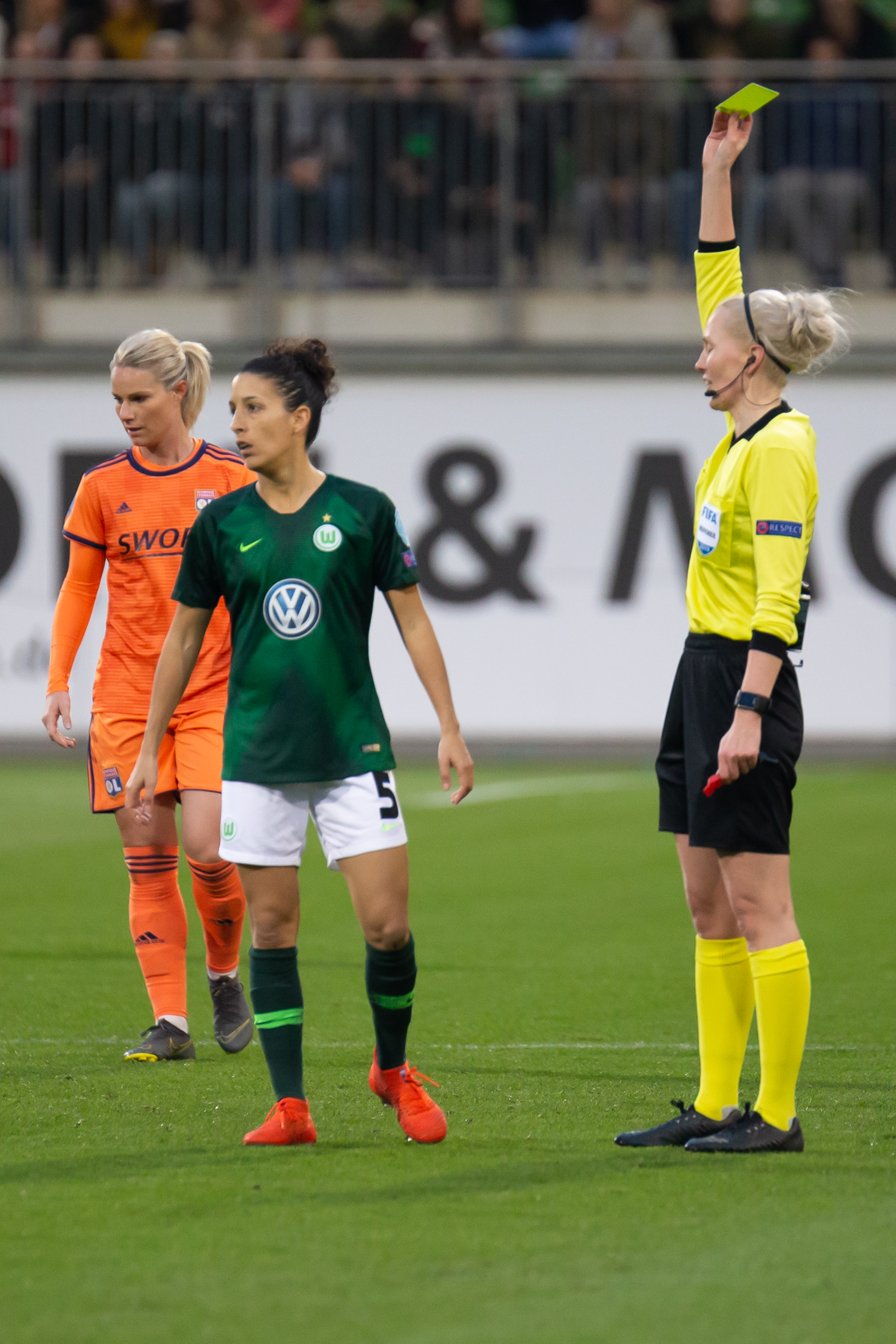
Finnish referee Lina Lehtovaara (right) officiated the final.

=== Officials ===
On 11 May 2022, UEFA named Finnish official Lina Lehtovaara as the referee for the final. Lehtovaara had been a FIFA referee since 2009, and was previously the fourth official in the 2010 UEFA Women's Champions League Final. She served as a fourth official at UEFA Women's Euro 2017, and was selected as a referee for UEFA Women's Euro 2022. She officiated three prior matches in the 2021–22 Women's Champions League season, with two matches in the group stage and one quarter-final leg. She was joined by Chrysoula Kourompylia of Greece and Karolin Kaivoja of Estonia as assistant referees. Czech referee Jana Adámková served as the fourth official, with her compatriot Lucie Ratajová working as the reserve assistant referee. Portuguese referees Tiago Martins and João Pinheiro worked as the VAR and assistant VAR officials, respectively, while Paolo Valeri of Italy was the support VAR.

== Match ==
=== Details ===
The "home" team (for administrative purposes) was determined by an additional draw held on 20 December 2021, 13:00 CET (after the quarter-final and semi-final draws), at the UEFA headquarters in Nyon, Switzerland.

21 May 2022
19:00 UTC+2

Barcelona (Spain)	1–3	(France) Lyon
Putellas 41'	Report	Henry 6'; Hegerberg 23'; Macario 33'

Juventus Stadium, Turin
Attendance: 32,257
Referee: Lina Lehtovaara (Finland)

**Barcelona**	**Lyon**

GK	1	(Spain) Sandra Paños
RB	8	(Spain) Marta Torrejón		(substituted off) 59'
CB	2	(Spain) Irene Paredes	(yellow card) 85'
CB	4	(Spain) María Pilar León	(yellow card) 33'
LB	16	(Sweden) Fridolina Rolfö		(substituted off) 75'
CM	14	(Spain) Aitana Bonmatí
CM	12	(Spain) Patricia Guijarro
CM	11	(Spain) Alexia Putellas (c)
RF	7	(Norway) Caroline Graham Hansen
CF	10	(Spain) Jennifer Hermoso		(substituted off) 46'
LF	9	(Spain) Mariona Caldentey		(substituted off) 59'
Substitutes:
GK	24	(Spain) Gemma Font
GK	30	(Spain) Meritxell Muñoz
DF	5	(Spain) Melanie Serrano
DF	15	(Spain) Leila Ouahabi
DF	17	(Spain) Andrea Pereira
MF	18	(Switzerland) Ana-Maria Crnogorčević		(substituted on) 59'
MF	23	(Norway) Ingrid Syrstad Engen
FW	6	(Spain) Clàudia Pina		(substituted on) 75'
FW	20	(Nigeria) Asisat Oshoala		(substituted on) 46'
FW	22	(Netherlands) Lieke Martens		(substituted on) 59'
Manager:
(Spain) Jonatan Giráldez			(yellow card) 80'

GK	1	(Chile) Christiane Endler
RB	12	(Australia) Ellie Carpenter		(substituted off) 14'
CB	3	(France) Wendie Renard (c)
CB	29	(France) Griedge Mbock Bathy		(substituted off) 81'
LB	4	(France) Selma Bacha
CM	26	(United States) Lindsey Horan
CM	6	(France) Amandine Henry
CM	13	(United States) Catarina Macario	(yellow card) 64'
RF	20	(France) Delphine Cascarino		(substituted off) 81'
CF	14	(Norway) Ada Hegerberg	(yellow card) 45+3'
LF	28	(France) Melvine Malard		(substituted off) 72'
Substitutes:
GK	16	(France) Sarah Bouhaddi
GK	40	(Sweden) Emma Holmgren
DF	5	(France) Perle Morroni	(yellow card) 90+4'	(substituted on) 81'
DF	18	(France) Alice Sombath
DF	21	(Canada) Kadeisha Buchanan		(substituted on) 14'
MF	8	(Iceland) Sara Björk Gunnarsdóttir
MF	11	(Netherlands) Damaris Egurrola
MF	17	(Netherlands) Daniëlle van de Donk
MF	23	(Belgium) Janice Cayman		(substituted on) 81'
FW	9	(France) Eugénie Le Sommer		(substituted on) 72'
FW	19	(France) Emelyne Laurent
FW	25	(France) Inès Benyahia
Manager:
(France) Sonia Bompastor

Player of the Match:
Amandine Henry (Lyon)

Assistant referees:
Chrysoula Kourompylia (Greece)
Karolin Kaivoja (Estonia)
Fourth official:
Jana Adámková (Czech Republic)
Reserve assistant referee:
Lucie Ratajová (Czech Republic)
Video assistant referee:
Tiago Martins (Portugal)
Assistant video assistant referee:
João Pinheiro (Portugal)
Support video assistant referee:
Paolo Valeri (Italy)

**Match rules**

- 90 minutes.
- 30 minutes of extra time if necessary.
- Penalty shoot-out if scores still level.
- Twelve named substitutes.
- Maximum of five substitutions, with a sixth allowed in extra time. (Note: Each team was given only three opportunities to make substitutions, with a fourth opportunity in extra time, excluding substitutions made at half-time, before the start of extra time and at half-time in extra time.)

=== Statistics ===
First half
Statistic	Barcelona	Lyon
Goals scored	1	3
Total shots	5	9
Shots on target	2	4
Saves	1	1
Ball possession	56%	44%
Corner kicks	3	1
Fouls committed	2	2
Offsides	1	1
Yellow cards	1	1
Red cards	0	0

Second half
Statistic	Barcelona	Lyon
Goals scored	0	0
Total shots	10	4
Shots on target	1	1
Saves	1	1
Ball possession	62%	38%
Corner kicks	1	0
Fouls committed	3	4
Offsides	4	0
Yellow cards	2	2
Red cards	0	0

Overall
Statistic	Barcelona	Lyon
Goals scored	1	3
Total shots	15	13
Shots on target	3	5
Saves	2	2
Ball possession	59%	41%
Corner kicks	4	1
Fouls committed	5	6
Offsides	5	1
Yellow cards	3	3
Red cards	0	0

== See also ==
- 2021–22 Olympique Lyonnais Féminin season
- 2021–22 FC Barcelona Femení season
- 2022 UEFA Champions League final
- 2022 UEFA Europa League final
- 2022 UEFA Europa Conference League final
- 2022 UEFA Super Cup
