= 2021–22 UEFA Women's Champions League knockout phase =

Tournament details
- Dates: 22 March – 21 May 2022
- Teams: 8

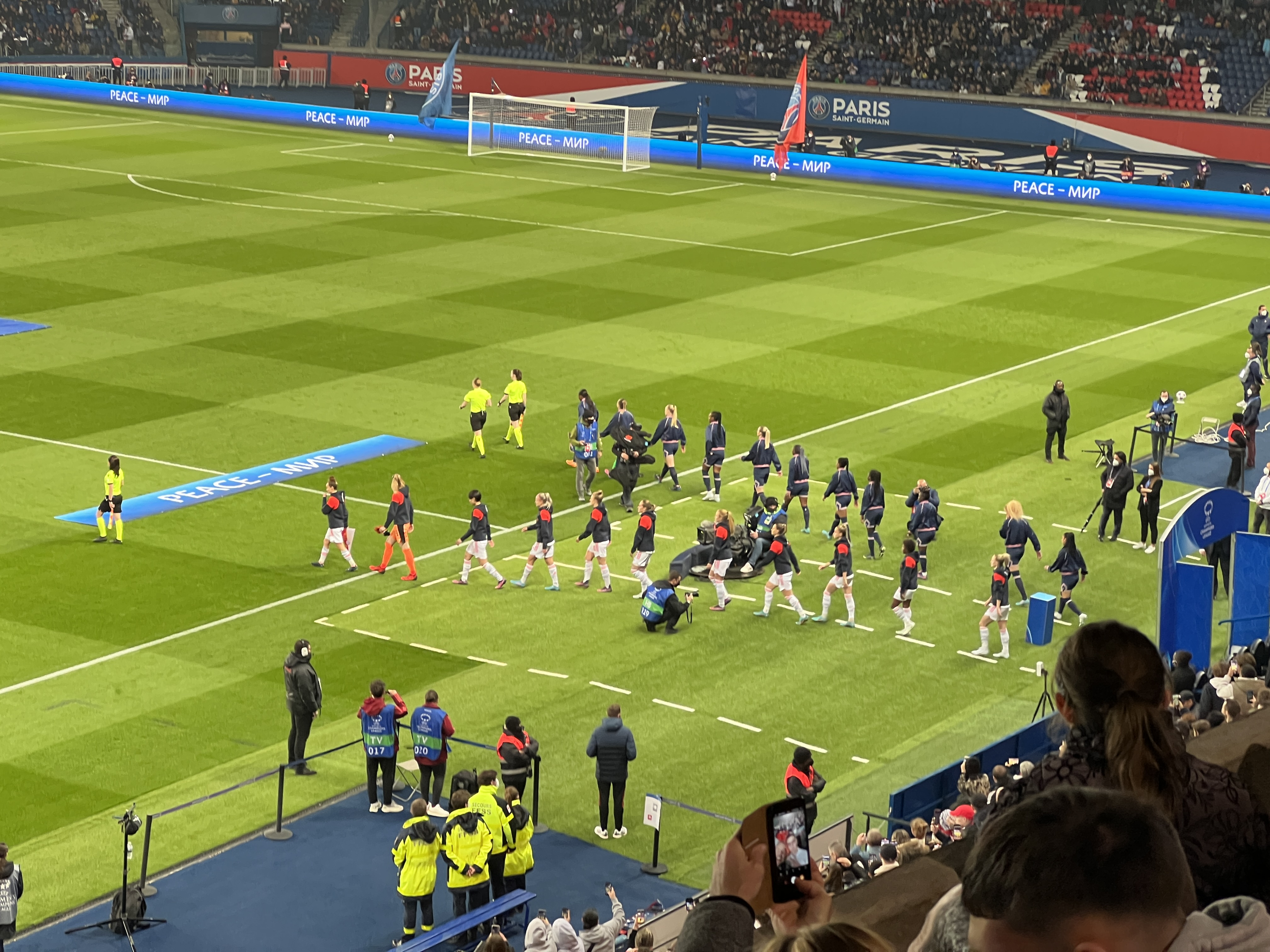
Paris Saint-Germain and Bayern Munich on the pitch for the quarter-final's return match at Parc des Princes, 30 March 2022.

The 2021–22 UEFA Women's Champions League knockout phase started on 22 March 2022 with the quarter-finals and ended with the final on 21 May 2022 at the Juventus Stadium in Turin, Italy, to decide the champions of the 2021–22 UEFA Women's Champions League. A total of eight teams competed in the knockout phase.

== Qualified teams ==
The knockout phase involved the eight teams which qualified as winners and runners-up of each of the four groups in the group stage.

Group	Winners (seeded in quarter finals draw)	Runners-up (unseeded in quarter finals draw)
A	(Germany) VfL Wolfsburg	(Italy) Juventus
B	(France) Paris Saint-Germain	(Spain) Real Madrid
C	(Spain) Barcelona	(England) Arsenal
D	(France) Lyon	(Germany) Bayern Munich

== Schedule ==
The schedule of the competition was as follows (all draws were held at the UEFA headquarters in Nyon, Switzerland).

Round	Draw date	First leg	Second leg
Quarter-finals	20 December 2021	22–23 March 2022	30–31 March 2022
Semi-finals	20 December 2021	23–24 April 2022	30 April – 1 May 2022
Final	20 December 2021	21 May 2022 at Juventus Stadium, Turin	

== Bracket ==
Quarter-finals
(Spain) Real Madrid	1	2	3
(Spain) Barcelona	3	5	8
(England) Arsenal	1	0	1
(Germany) VfL Wolfsburg	1	2	3
(Italy) Juventus	2	1	3
(France) Lyon	1	3	4
(Germany) Bayern Munich	1	2	3
(France) Paris Saint-Germain	2	2	4

Semi-finals
(Spain) Barcelona	5	0	5
(Germany) VfL Wolfsburg	1	2	3
(France) Lyon	3	2	5
(France) Paris Saint-Germain	2	1	3

Final
21 May – Turin
(Spain) Barcelona	1
(France) Lyon	3

== Quarter-finals ==
The draw for the quarter-finals was held on 20 December 2021.

=== Summary ===
The first legs were played on 22 and 23 March, and the second legs on 30 and 31 March 2022.

Team 1	Agg.	Team 2	1st leg	2nd leg
Bayern Munich (Germany)	3–4	(France) Paris Saint-Germain	1–2	2–2 (a.e.t.)
Juventus (Italy)	3–4	(France) Lyon	2–1	1–3
Arsenal (England)	1–3	(Germany) VfL Wolfsburg	1–1	0–2
Real Madrid (Spain)	3–8	(Spain) Barcelona	1–3	2–5

=== Matches ===
22 March 2022
18:45

Bayern Munich (Germany)	1–2	(France) Paris Saint-Germain
Bühl 84'	Report	Katoto 20', 71'

Allianz Arena, Munich
Attendance: 13,000
Referee: Marta Huerta De Aza (Spain)
30 March 2022
21:00

Paris Saint-Germain (France)	2–2 (a.e.t.)	(Germany) Bayern Munich
Baltimore 17'; Bachmann 112'	Report	Kumagai 19'; Schüller 55'

Parc des Princes, Paris
Attendance: 27,262
Referee: Esther Staubli (Switzerland)

Paris Saint-Germain won 4–3 on aggregate.

23 March 2022
18:45

Juventus (Italy)	2–1	(France) Lyon
Girelli 71'; Bonfantini 83'	Report	Macario 8'

Juventus Stadium, Turin
Attendance: 9,227
Referee: Cheryl Foster (Wales)
31 March 2022
21:00

Lyon (France)	3–1	(Italy) Juventus
Hegerberg 33'; Malard 35'; Macario 73'	Report	Stašková 84'

Parc Olympique Lyonnais, Décines-Charpieu
Attendance: 20,017
Referee: Riem Hussein (Germany)

Lyon won 4–3 on aggregate.

23 March 2022
21:00

Arsenal (England)	1–1	(Germany) VfL Wolfsburg
Wubben-Moy 89'	Report	Waßmuth 19'

Arsenal Stadium, London
Attendance: 5,018
Referee: Jana Adámková (Czech Republic)
31 March 2022
18:45

VfL Wolfsburg (Germany)	2–0	(England) Arsenal
Roord 9'; Williamson 73' (o.g.)	Report

Volkswagen Arena, Wolfsburg
Attendance: 11,293
Referee: Ivana Projkovska (North Macedonia)

VfL Wolfsburg won 3–1 on aggregate.

22 March 2022
21:00

Real Madrid (Spain)	1–3	(Spain) Barcelona
Carmona 8'	Report	Putellas 53' (pen.), 90+4'; Pina 81'

Alfredo Di Stéfano, Madrid
Attendance: 3,318
Referee: Lina Lehtovaara (Finland)
30 March 2022
18:45

Barcelona (Spain)	5–2	(Spain) Real Madrid
León 8'; Bonmatí 52'; Pina 55'; Putellas 62'; Hansen 70'	Report	Carmona 16' (pen.); Zornoza 48'

Camp Nou, Barcelona
Attendance: 91,553
Referee: Stéphanie Frappart (France)

Barcelona won 8–3 on aggregate.

== Semi-finals ==
The draw for the semi-finals was held on 20 December 2021 (after the quarter-final draw).

=== Summary ===
The first legs were played from 22 and 24 April and the second legs on 30 April 2022. Barcelona's home quarter- and semi-finals (91,553 and 91,648) were the largest known attendances for official women's football since the 1971 Women's World Cup (non-official), where Mexico–Denmark drew 110,000 spectators at the Estadio Azteca in Mexico.

Team 1	Agg.	Team 2	1st leg	2nd leg
Barcelona (Spain)	5–3	(Germany) VfL Wolfsburg	5–1	0–2
Lyon (France)	5–3	(France) Paris Saint-Germain	3–2	2–1

=== Matches ===
22 April 2022
18:45

Barcelona (Spain)	5–1	(Germany) VfL Wolfsburg
Bonmatí 3'; Hansen 10'; Hermoso 33'; Putellas 38', 85' (pen.)	Report	Roord 70'

Camp Nou, Barcelona
Attendance: 91,648
Referee: Sandra Braz Bastos (Portugal)
30 April 2022
18:00

VfL Wolfsburg (Germany)	2–0	(Spain) Barcelona
Waßmuth 47'; Roord 60'	Report

Volkswagen Arena, Wolfsburg
Attendance: 22,057
Referee: Cheryl Foster (Wales)

Barcelona won 5–3 on aggregate.

24 April 2022
17:00

Lyon (France)	3–2	(France) Paris Saint-Germain
Renard 23' (pen.); Macario 34', 50'	Report	Katoto 6'; Dudek 58' (pen.)

Parc Olympique Lyonnais, Décines-Charpieu
Attendance: 22,774
Referee: Ivana Martinčić (Croatia)
30 April 2022
21:00

Paris Saint-Germain (France)	1–2	(France) Lyon
Katoto 62'	Report	Hegerberg 14'; Renard 83'

Parc des Princes, Paris
Attendance: 43,255
Referee: Rebecca Welch (England)

Lyon won 5–3 on aggregate.

== Final ==
The final was played on 21 May 2022 at Juventus Stadium, Turin. A draw was held on 20 December 2021, (after the quarter-final and semi-final draws), to determine which semi-final winner would be designated as the "home" team for administrative purposes.

21 May 2022
19:00

Barcelona (Spain)	1–3	(France) Lyon
Putellas 41'	Report	Henry 6'; Hegerberg 23'; Macario 33'

Juventus Stadium, Turin
Attendance: 32,257
Referee: Lina Lehtovaara (Finland)
