= 2021–22 UEFA Women's Champions League group stage =

International Women's football competition

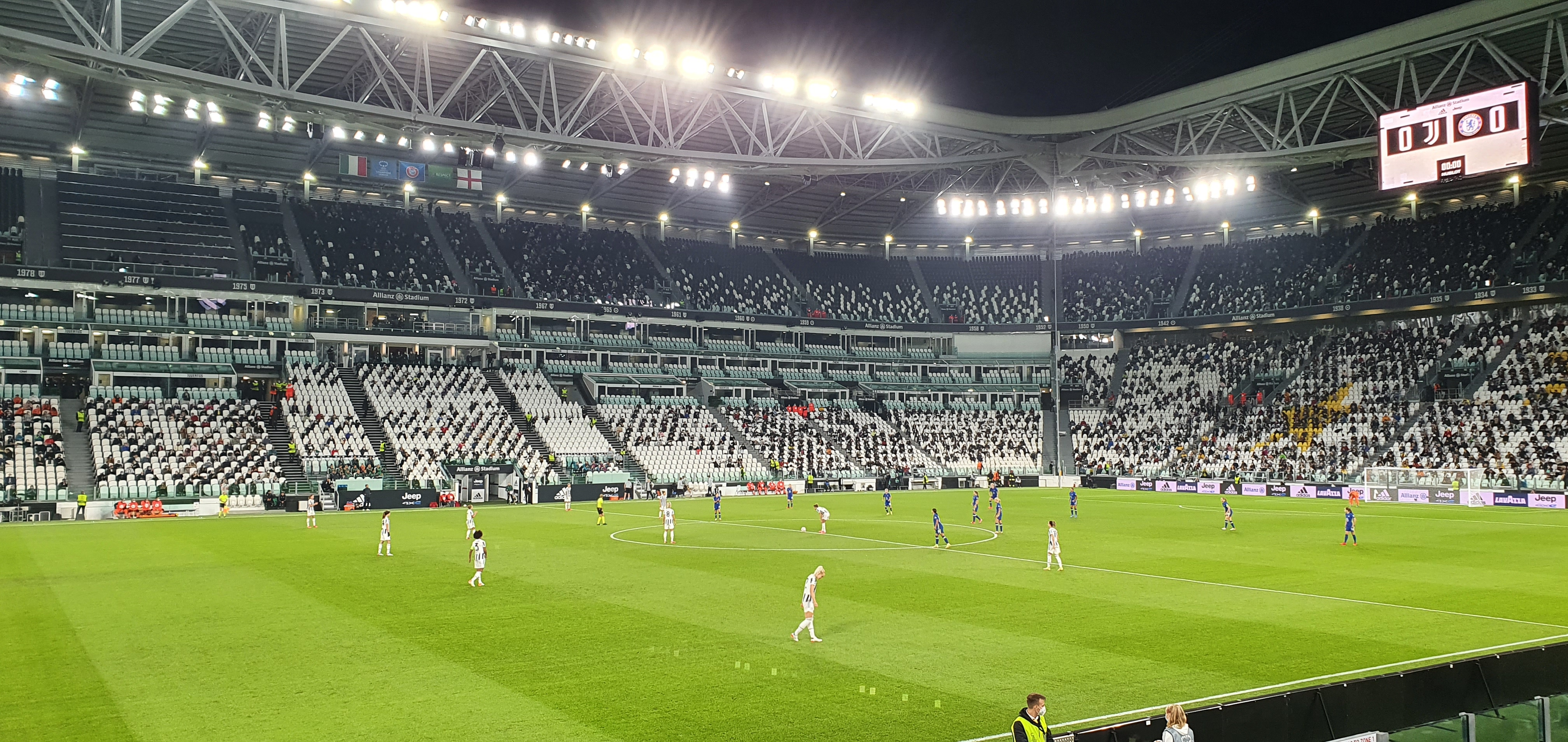
The kick-off of Juventus – Chelsea at Juventus Stadium, 13 October 2021.

The 2021–22 UEFA Women's Champions League group stage, which is first ever group stage of the competition, began on 5 October 2021 and ended on 16 December 2021. A total of 16 teams will compete in the group stage to decide the 8 places in the knockout phase of the 2021–22 UEFA Women's Champions League.

HB Køge, 1899 Hoffenheim and Real Madrid were playing in Europe for the first time this season. Benfica, Juventus, Zhytlobud-1 Kharkiv and Servette Chênois made their debut appearance in the last 16 under any format. Benfica were the first team from Portugal to in the last 16.

== Draw ==
The draw for the group stage was held on 13 September 2021, 13:00 CEST, in Nyon. The 16 teams were drawn into four groups of four. For the draw, the teams were seeded into four pots, each of four teams, based on the following principles:

- Pot 1 contained the four direct entrants, i.e., the Champions League holders and the champions of the top three associations based on their 2020 UEFA women's country coefficients.
- Pot 2, 3 and 4 contained the remaining teams, seeded based on their 2021 UEFA women's club coefficients.

Teams from the same association could not be drawn into the same group. Prior to the draw, UEFA formed one pairing of teams for associations with two or three teams based on television audiences, where one team was drawn into Groups A–B and another team into Groups C–D, so that the two teams played on different days. Clubs from countries with severe winter conditions (Sweden, Iceland) were assigned a position in their group which allowed them to play away on matchday 6.

- A (Spain) Barcelona and Real Madrid
- B (France) Paris Saint-Germain and Lyon
- C (Germany) Bayern Munich and VfL Wolfsburg
- D (England) Chelsea and Arsenal

== Teams ==
Below are the participating teams (with their 2021 UEFA club coefficients), grouped by their seeding pot. They include:

- 4 teams which entered in this stage
- 12 winners of the Round 2 (7 from Champions Path, 5 from League Path)

Key to colours
Group winners and runners-up advance to Quarter-finals

Pot 1 (by association rank)
Assoc.	Team	Coeff.
TH & 3	(Spain) Barcelona	104.800
1	(France) Paris Saint-Germain	85.400
2	(Germany) Bayern Munich	84.100
4	(England) Chelsea	70.700

Pot 2
Team	Notes	Coeff.
(France) Lyon		124.400
(Germany) VfL Wolfsburg		97.100
(England) Arsenal		27.700
(Iceland) Breiðablik		17.000

Pot 3
Team	Notes	Coeff.
(Sweden) BK Häcken		16.100
(Italy) Juventus		15.200
(Germany) 1899 Hoffenheim		15.100
(Spain) Real Madrid		12.800

Pot 4
Team	Notes	Coeff.
(Ukraine) Zhytlobud-1 Kharkiv		9.100
(Switzerland) Servette Chênois		7.600
(Denmark) HB Køge		6.900
(Portugal) Benfica		5.600

Notes

1. ^{TH} Champions League title holders, automatically placed into Pot 1 as top seed. Because the title holders were also the champions of the third-ranked association, the champions of the fourth-ranked association also entered the group stage.
2. ^{CH} Winners of round 2 (Champions Path).
3. ^{LP} Winners of round 2 (League Path).

== Format ==
In each group, teams played against each other home-and-away in a round-robin format. The top two teams of each group advanced to the quarter-finals.

=== Tiebreakers ===
Teams are ranked according to points (3 points for a win, 1 point for a draw, 0 points for a loss). If two or more teams are tied on points, the following tiebreaking criteria are applied, in the order given, to determine the rankings (see Article 18 Equality of points – group stage, Regulations of the UEFA Women's Champions League):

1. Points in head-to-head matches among the tied teams;
2. Goal difference in head-to-head matches among the tied teams;
3. Goals scored in head-to-head matches among the tied teams;
4. If more than two teams were tied, and after applying all head-to-head criteria above, a subset of teams are still tied, all head-to-head criteria above are reapplied exclusively to this subset of teams;
5. Goal difference in all group matches;
6. Goals scored in all group matches;
7. Away goals scored in all group matches;
8. Wins in all group matches;
9. Away wins in all group matches;
10. Disciplinary points (direct red card = 3 points; double yellow card = 3 points; single yellow card = 1 point);
11. UEFA club coefficient.

Due to the abolition of the away goals rule, head-to-head away goals are no longer applied as a tiebreaker. However, total away goals are still applied as a tiebreaker.

== Groups ==
The fixtures were announced on 13 September 2021 after the draw. The matches were played on 5–6 October, 13–14 October, 9–10 November, 17–18 November, 8–9 December, and 15–16 December 2021. The scheduled kick-off times were 18:45 and 21:00 CET/CEST, with two matches at both kick-off times on each day.

Times are CET/CEST, (Note: CEST (UTC+2) for dates up to 30 October 2021 (matchdays 1–2), and CET (UTC+1) for dates thereafter (matchdays 3–6).) as listed by UEFA (local times, if different, are in parentheses).

=== Group A ===
Pos	Team	Pld	W	D	L	GF	GA	GD	Pts	Qualification	WOL	JUV	CHE	SER
1	(Germany) VfL Wolfsburg	6	3	2	1	17	7	+10	11 (Note: Head-to-head points: Wolfsburg 5, Juventus 5, Chelsea 5. Head-to-head goal differences: Wolfsburg +2, Juventus +1, Chelsea −3.)	Advance to Quarter-finals	—	0–2	4–0	5–0
2	(Italy) Juventus	6	3	2	1	12	4	+8	11	Advance to Quarter-finals	2–2	—	1–2	4–0
3	(England) Chelsea	6	3	2	1	13	8	+5	11		3–3	0–0	—	1–0
4	(Switzerland) Servette Chênois	6	0	0	6	0	23	−23	0		0–3	0–3	0–7	—

Source: UEFA
Rules for classification: Group stage tiebreakers
Notes:
6 October 2021
18:45

Servette Chênois (Switzerland)	0–3	(Italy) Juventus
	Report	Caruso 36'; Hurtig 65'; Cernoia 71'

Stade de Genève, Geneva
Attendance: 5,900
Referee: Eleni Antoniou (Greece)
6 October 2021
21:00 (20:00 BST)

Chelsea (England)	3–3	(Germany) VfL Wolfsburg
Kerr 12'; England 51'; Harder 90+2'	Report	Waßmuth 18', 48'; Roord 34'

Kingsmeadow, Kingston upon Thames
Attendance: 1,371
Referee: Lina Lehtovaara (Finland)

13 October 2021
18:45

VfL Wolfsburg (Germany)	5–0	(Switzerland) Servette Chênois
Huth 18'; Waßmuth 26', 43'; Janssen 51'; Smits 68'	Report 1, Report 2

AOK Stadion, Wolfsburg
Attendance: 869
Referee: Frida Mia Klarlund Nielsen (Denmark)
13 October 2021
21:00

Juventus (Italy)	1–2	(England) Chelsea
Bonansea 37'	Report	Cuthbert 31'; Harder 69'

Juventus Stadium, Turin
Attendance: 16,761
Referee: Ivana Martinčić (Croatia)

9 November 2021
18:45

Servette Chênois (Switzerland)	0–7	(England) Chelsea
	Report	Leupolz 8'; Kirby 16', 26'; Kerr 18', 20'; Fleming 38'; Reiten 50'

Stade de Genève, Geneva
Attendance: 12,782
Referee: Iuliana Demetrescu (Romania)
9 November 2021
21:00

Juventus (Italy)	2–2	(Germany) VfL Wolfsburg
Girelli 22', 90+1'	Report	Lattwein 25'; Waßmuth 65'

Juventus Stadium, Turin
Attendance: 12,789
Referee: Anastasia Pustovoitova (Russia)

18 November 2021
18:45

VfL Wolfsburg (Germany)	0–2	(Italy) Juventus
	Report 1 Report 2	Hendrich 53' (o.g.); Stašková 90+3'

AOK Stadion, Wolfsburg
Attendance: 1,725
Referee: Marta Huerta De Aza (Spain)
18 November 2021
21:00 (20:00 GMT)

Chelsea (England)	1–0	(Switzerland) Servette Chênois
Kerr 67'	Report

Kingsmeadow, Kingston upon Thames
Attendance: 1,270
Referee: Hristiyana Guteva (Bulgaria)

8 December 2021
18:45

Servette Chênois (Switzerland)	0–3	(Germany) VfL Wolfsburg
	Report 1, Report 2	Pereira 21' (o.g.); Roord 84'; Waßmuth 90+3'

Stade de Genève, Geneva
Attendance: 3,249
Referee: Henrikke Nervik (Norway)
8 December 2021
21:00 (20:00 GMT)

Chelsea (England)	0–0	(Italy) Juventus
	Report

Kingsmeadow, Kingston upon Thames
Attendance: 1,808
Referee: Sara Persson (Sweden)

16 December 2021
21:00

VfL Wolfsburg (Germany)	4–0	(England) Chelsea
Huth 16', 23'; Waßmuth 60', 78'	Report

AOK Stadion, Wolfsburg
Attendance: 1,107
Referee: Kateryna Monzul (Ukraine)
16 December 2021
21:00

Juventus (Italy)	4–0	(Switzerland) Servette Chênois
Hurtig 12'; Girelli 20' (pen.), 64' (pen.); Bonfantini 90'	Report 1 Report 2

Juventus Stadium, Turin
Attendance: 6,508
Referee: Jelena Cvetković (Serbia)

=== Group B ===
Pos	Team	Pld	W	D	L	GF	GA	GD	Pts	Qualification	PSG	RMA	KHA	BRE
1	(France) Paris Saint-Germain	6	6	0	0	25	0	+25	18	Advance to Quarter-finals	—	4–0	5–0	6–0
2	(Spain) Real Madrid	6	4	0	2	12	6	+6	12	Advance to Quarter-finals	0–2	—	3–0	5–0
3	(Ukraine) Zhytlobud-1 Kharkiv	6	1	1	4	2	15	−13	4		0–6	0–1	—	0–0
4	(Iceland) Breiðablik	6	0	1	5	0	18	−18	1		0–2	0–3	0–2	—

Source: UEFA
Rules for classification: Group stage tiebreakers
6 October 2021
18:45 (19:45 EEST)

Zhytlobud-1 Kharkiv (Ukraine)	0–1	(Spain) Real Madrid
	Report	Navarro 34'

Metalist OSC, Kharkiv
Attendance: 7,312
Referee: Shona Shukrula (Netherlands)
6 October 2021
21:00 (19:00 WET)

Breiðablik (Iceland)	0–2	(France) Paris Saint-Germain
	Report	Khelifi 17'; Geyoro 89'

Kópavogsvöllur, Kópavogur
Attendance: 1,412
Referee: Iuliana Demetrescu (Romania)

13 October 2021
18:45

Paris Saint-Germain (France)	5–0	(Ukraine) Zhytlobud-1 Kharkiv
Huitema 25', 32', 42'; Dudek 59'; Khelifi 88'	Report

Stade Jean-Bouin, Paris
Attendance: 1,088
Referee: Sara Persson (Sweden)
13 October 2021
21:00

Real Madrid (Spain)	5–0	(Iceland) Breiðablik
Møller 6', 20', 43'; Carmona 48'; Navarro 89'	Report

Alfredo Di Stéfano, Madrid
Attendance: 437
Referee: Sandra Bastos (Portugal)

9 November 2021
18:45 (19:45 EET)

Zhytlobud-1 Kharkiv (Ukraine)	0–0	(Iceland) Breiðablik
	Report

Metalist OSC, Kharkiv
Attendance: 1,542
Referee: Riem Hussein (Germany)
9 November 2021
21:00

Paris Saint-Germain (France)	4–0	(Spain) Real Madrid
Katoto 13', 54'; Däbritz 41'; Gálvez 65' (o.g.)	Report

Parc des Princes, Paris
Attendance: 18,344
Referee: Rebecca Welch (England)

18 November 2021
18:45 (17:45 WET)

Breiðablik (Iceland)	0–2	(Ukraine) Zhytlobud-1 Kharkiv
	Report	Shevchuk 42'; Ovdiychuk 74'

Kópavogsvöllur, Kópavogur
Attendance: 456
Referee: Lorraine Watson (Scotland)
18 November 2021
21:00

Real Madrid (Spain)	0–2	(France) Paris Saint-Germain
	Report	Katoto 33'; Karchaoui 70'

Alfredo Di Stéfano, Madrid
Attendance: 2,502
Referee: Cheryl Foster (Wales)

8 December 2021
18:45 (19:45 EET)

Zhytlobud-1 Kharkiv (Ukraine)	0–6	(France) Paris Saint-Germain
	Report	Huitema 15'; Bachmann 21', 40'; Baltimore 37'; Fazer 44'; Ilestedt 54'

Metalist OSC, Kharkiv
Attendance: 1,617
Referee: Frida Nielsen (Denmark)
8 December 2021
21:00 (20:00 WET)

Breiðablik (Iceland)	0–3	(Spain) Real Madrid
	Report	Asllani 10', 40' (pen.); Zornoza 82'

Kópavogsvöllur, Kópavogur
Attendance: 458
Referee: Désirée Grundbacher (Switzerland)

16 December 2021
18:45

Paris Saint-Germain (France)	6–0	(Iceland) Breiðablik
Bachmann 10'; Huitema 45', 90+4'; Diani 60'; Baltimore 69'; Luana 86'	Report

Stade Jean-Bouin, Paris
Attendance: 977
Referee: Ewa Augustyn (Poland)
16 December 2021
18:45

Real Madrid (Spain)	3–0	(Ukraine) Zhytlobud-1 Kharkiv
Peter 19'; Oroz 41'; González 90+2'	Report

Alfredo Di Stéfano, Madrid
Attendance: 409
Referee: Ivana Projkovska (North Macedonia)

=== Group C ===
Pos	Team	Pld	W	D	L	GF	GA	GD	Pts	Qualification	BAR	ARS	HOF	KOG
1	(Spain) Barcelona	6	6	0	0	24	1	+23	18	Advance to Quarter-finals	—	4–1	4–0	5–0
2	(England) Arsenal	6	3	0	3	14	13	+1	9 (Note: Head-to-head points: Arsenal 3, 1899 Hoffenheim 3. Head-to-head goal differences: Arsenal +1, 1899 Hoffenheim −1.)	Advance to Quarter-finals	0–4	—	4–0	3–0
3	(Germany) 1899 Hoffenheim	6	3	0	3	11	15	−4	9		0–5	4–1	—	5–0
4	(Denmark) HB Køge	6	0	0	6	2	22	−20	0		0–2	1–5	1–2	—

Source: UEFA
Rules for classification: Group stage tiebreakers
Notes:
5 October 2021
18:45

1899 Hoffenheim (Germany)	5–0	(Denmark) HB Køge
Naschenweng 18'; Billa 47'; Bühler 61'; De Caigny 63', 90+3'	Report 1 Report 2

Dietmar-Hopp-Stadion, Hoffenheim
Attendance: 780
Referee: Anastasia Pustovoitova (Russia)
5 October 2021
21:00

Barcelona (Spain)	4–1	(England) Arsenal
Caldentey 31'; Putellas 42'; Oshoala 47'; Martens 84'	Report	Maanum 74'

Johan Cruyff Stadium, Sant Joan Despí
Attendance: 2,968
Referee: Jana Adámková (Czech Republic)

14 October 2021
18:45

HB Køge (Denmark)	0–2	(Spain) Barcelona
	Report	Rolfö 63'; Hermoso 90+5' (pen.)

Køge Stadium, Køge
Attendance: 1,930
Referee: Esther Staubli (Switzerland)
14 October 2021
21:00 (20:00 BST)

Arsenal (England)	4–0	(Germany) 1899 Hoffenheim
Little 21' (pen.); Heath 45+2'; Miedema 52'; Williamson 86'	Report

Meadow Park, Borehamwood
Attendance: 808
Referee: Stéphanie Frappart (France)

10 November 2021
18:45

HB Køge (Denmark)	1–5	(England) Arsenal
Pokorny 71'	Report	Catley 27'; Parris 62'; Foord 69'; Patten 85'; Nobbs 89'

Køge Stadium, Køge
Attendance: 2,103
Referee: Sandra Braz Bastos (Portugal)
10 November 2021
18:45

Barcelona (Spain)	4–0	(Germany) 1899 Hoffenheim
Hermoso 5'; Putellas 19', 33'; Torrejón 74'	Report

Johan Cruyff Stadium, Sant Joan Despí
Attendance: 2,068
Referee: Sara Persson (Sweden)

17 November 2021
18:45

1899 Hoffenheim (Germany)	0–5	(Spain) Barcelona
	Report	Putellas 41' (pen.); Paredes 53'; Bonmatí 57'; Torrejón 89'; Crnogorčević 90+2'

Dietmar-Hopp-Stadion, Hoffenheim
Attendance: 2,200
Referee: Ivana Martinčić (Croatia)
17 November 2021
21:00 (20:00 GMT)

Arsenal (England)	3–0	(Denmark) HB Køge
Foord 16'; Wubben-Moy 83'; Miedema 88'	Report

Meadow Park, Borehamwood
Attendance: 819
Referee: Kateryna Monzul (Ukraine)

9 December 2021
18:45

HB Køge (Denmark)	1–2	(Germany) 1899 Hoffenheim
Carusa 9'	Report 1 Report 2	Billa 27' (pen.), 38' (pen.)

Køge Stadium, Køge
Attendance: 912
Referee: Eleni Antoniou (Greece)
9 December 2021
20:00 (19:00 GMT)

Arsenal (England)	0–4	(Spain) Barcelona
	Report	Bonmatí 22'; Hermoso 28', 75'; Rolfö 45+2'

Arsenal Stadium, London
Attendance: 12,232
Referee: Anastasia Pustovoitova (Russia)

15 December 2021
21:00

1899 Hoffenheim (Germany)	4–1	(England) Arsenal
Brand 22'; Hagel 55', 57'; Corley 60'	Report 1 Report 2	Wienroither 38' (o.g.)

Dietmar-Hopp-Stadion, Hoffenheim
Attendance: 750
Referee: Maria Marotta (Italy)
15 December 2021
21:00

Barcelona (Spain)	5–0	(Denmark) HB Køge
Ouahabi 10'; Rolfö 29'; Putellas 44'; Engen 65'; Martens 73'	Report

Johan Cruyff Stadium, Sant Joan Despí
Attendance: 1,572
Referee: Petra Pavlíková (Slovakia)

=== Group D ===
Pos	Team	Pld	W	D	L	GF	GA	GD	Pts	Qualification	LYO	BAY	BEN	HAK
1	(France) Lyon	6	5	0	1	19	2	+17	15	Advance to Quarter-finals	—	2–1	5–0	4–0
2	(Germany) Bayern Munich	6	4	1	1	15	3	+12	13	Advance to Quarter-finals	1–0	—	4–0	4–0
3	(Portugal) Benfica	6	1	1	4	2	16	−14	4		0–5	0–0	—	0–1
4	(Sweden) BK Häcken	6	1	0	5	3	18	−15	3		0–3	1–5	1–2	—

Source: UEFA
Rules for classification: Group stage tiebreakers
5 October 2021
18:45

BK Häcken (Sweden)	0–3	(France) Lyon
	Report 1 Report 2	Malard 10'; Macario 48'; Larsen 53' (o.g.)

Bravida Arena, Gothenburg
Attendance: 4,104
Referee: Lorraine Watson (Scotland)
5 October 2021
21:00 (20:00 WEST)

Benfica (Portugal)	0–0	(Germany) Bayern Munich
	Report 1, Report 2

Benfica Campus, Seixal
Attendance: 1,072
Referee: Marta Huerta de Aza (Spain)

14 October 2021
18:45

Bayern Munich (Germany)	4–0	(Sweden) BK Häcken
Schüller 8', 11'; Dallmann 70'; Damnjanović 90+1'	Report 1 Report 2

FC Bayern Campus, Munich
Attendance: 688
Referee: Rebecca Welch (England)
14 October 2021
21:00

Lyon (France)	5–0	(Portugal) Benfica
Buchanan 29', 63'; Van de Donk 31'; Malard 53'; Macario 56' (pen.)	Report 1, Report 2

Parc Olympique Lyonnais, Décines-Charpieu
Attendance: 4,115
Referee: Cheryl Foster (Wales)

10 November 2021
21:00

Lyon (France)	2–1	(Germany) Bayern Munich
Henry 50'; Cayman 86'	Report 1 Report 2	Buchanan 25' (o.g.)

Parc Olympique Lyonnais, Décines-Charpieu
Attendance: 7,754
Referee: Monika Mularczyk (Poland)
10 November 2021
21:00 (20:00 WET)

Benfica (Portugal)	0–1	(Sweden) BK Häcken
	Report 1 Report 2	Rubensson 76' (pen.)

Benfica Campus, Seixal
Attendance: 486
Referee: Esther Staubli (Switzerland)

17 November 2021
18:45

BK Häcken (Sweden)	1–2	(Portugal) Benfica
Rubensson 74' (pen.)	Report 1, Report 2	Lacasse 3'; Amado 90+2'

Bravida Arena, Gothenburg
Attendance: 2,801
Referee: Jana Adámková (Czech Republic)
17 November 2021
21:00

Bayern Munich (Germany)	1–0	(France) Lyon
Kumagai 69'	Report 1, Report 2

FC Bayern Campus, Munich
Attendance: 1,857
Referee: Lina Lehtovaara (Finland)

9 December 2021
18:45

BK Häcken (Sweden)	1–5	(Germany) Bayern Munich
Blackstenius 36'	Report 1, Report 2	Asseyi 39'; Damnjanović 45', 55'; Dallmann 73'; Beerensteyn 87'

Bravida Arena, Gothenburg
Attendance: 3,121
Referee: Iuliana Demetrescu (Romania)
9 December 2021
21:00 (20:00 WET)

Benfica (Portugal)	0–5	(France) Lyon
	Report 1, Report 2	Hegerberg 1', 45+3'; Renard 27'; Mbock Bathy 40'; Bruun 52'

Benfica Campus, Seixal
Attendance: 412
Referee: Rebecca Welch (England)

15 December 2021
18:45

Lyon (France)	4–0	(Sweden) BK Häcken
Macario 35'; Hegerberg 52'; Henry 76'; Cayman 79'	Report 1 Report 2

Groupama OL Training Center, Décines-Charpieu
Attendance: 745
Referee: Marta Huerta de Aza (Spain)
15 December 2021
18:45

Bayern Munich (Germany)	4–0	(Portugal) Benfica
Vilhjálmsdóttir 26'; Schüller 28'; Gwinn 48' (pen.); Bühl 49'	Report

FC Bayern Campus, Munich
Attendance: 0
Referee: Lorraine Watson (Scotland)
