= Portugal women's national football team results (2020–present) =

- Win Draw Loss

This is a list of the Portugal women's national football team results from 2020 to present.

== Results ==
=== 2020 ===
4 March 2020 2020 Algarve Cup	Portugal	1–2	Italy	Faro/Loulé, Portugal
20:15 (21:15 CET)	Silva 34'	Report	78' Linari; 90+4' (pen.) Girelli	Stadium: Estádio Algarve; Referee: Francia González (Mexico)

7 March 2020 2020 Algarve Cup	Portugal	0–1	Belgium	Parchal, Portugal
17:00		Report	De Caigny 65'	Stadium: Vista Municipal Stadium; Referee: Emikar Calderas (Venezuela)

10 March 2020 2020 Algarve Cup	Portugal	0–2	Sweden	Faro/Loulé, Portugal
20:00			Jakobsson 45+2'; Rolfö 51'	Stadium: Estádio Algarve

27 October 2020 Euro 2021 qualifying	Portugal	1–0	Cyprus	Estoril, Portugal
19:00 (18:00 WET)	Charalambous 61' (o.g.)	Report		Stadium: Estádio António Coimbra da Mota; Referee: Henrikke Nervik (Norway)

27 November 2020 Euro 2021 qualifying	Portugal	1–0	Scotland	Lisbon, Portugal
20:00 (19:00 WET)	Borges 69'	Report		Stadium: Estádio do Restelo; Referee: Ivana Martinčić (Croatia)

1 December 2020 Euro 2021 qualifying	Portugal	1–0	Albania	Lisbon, Portugal
18:45 (17:45 WET)	Capeta 57'	Report		Stadium: Estádio do Restelo; Referee: Olga Zadinová (Czech Republic)

=== 2021 ===
19 February Euro 2022 qualifying	Finland	1–0	Portugal	Helsinki, Finland
17:15 (18:15 EET)	Sällström 90+3'	Report (UEFA)		Stadium: Bolt Arena; Attendance: 0 Referee: Kateryna Monzul (Ukraine)

23 February Euro 2022 qualifying	Scotland	0–2	Portugal	Larnaca, Cyprus
16:10 (17:10 EET)		Report (UEFA)	Capeta 27'; Fátima Pinto 90+2'	Stadium: Antonis Papadopoulos Stadium; Referee: Rebecca Welch (England)

9 April UEFA Women's Euro Play-Offs	Portugal	0–1	Russia	Lisbon, Portugal
19:30		Report (UEFA)	Korovkina 51'	Stadium: Estádio do Restelo; Referee: Esther Staubli (Switzerland)

13 April UEFA Women's Euro Play-Offs	Russia	0–0	Portugal	Moscow, Russia
17:00		Report (UEFA)		Stadium: Sapsan Arena; Referee: Stéphanie Frappart (France)

10 June Friendly	United States	1–0	Portugal	Houston, Texas, United States
2:30	S. Mewis 76'	Report		Stadium: BBVA Stadium; Attendance: 9,951; Referee: Danielle Chesky (United States)

13 June Friendly	Portugal	3–3	Nigeria	Houston, Texas, United States
1:15	Okeke 22' (o.g.); Costa 34'; Encarnação 49'	Report	Alozie 44'; Gomes 52' (o.g.); Ajibade 90+5'	Stadium: BBVA Stadium; Attendance: 4,424; Referee: Katja Koroleva (United States)

16 September 2023 FIFA Women's World Cup qualification– UEFAGroup H	Turkey	1–1	Portugal	Alanya, Turkey
19:00 UTC+2	Uraz 30'	Report	Silva 58'	Stadium: Bahçeşehir Okulları Stadium; Referee: Maika Vanderstiche (France)

19 September 2023 FIFA Women's World Cup qualification– UEFAGroup H	Israel	0–4	Portugal	Rishon LeZion, Israel
18:00 UTC+2		Report	Encarnação 2'; Do. Silva 7' (pen.); Gomes 64'; C. Costa 84'	Stadium: Haberfeld Stadium; Referee: Maria Marotta (Italy)

21 October 2023 FIFA Women's World Cup qualification– UEFAGroup H	Portugal	2–1	Serbia	Setúbal
	Borges 28'; Silva 52' (pen.)	Report	Matejić 45+2'	Stadium: Estádio do Bonfim; Referee: Ewa Augustyn (Poland)

26 October 2023 FIFA Women's World Cup qualification– UEFAGroup H	Bulgaria	0–5	Portugal	Stadion Lokomotiv, Plovdiv
17:00 (18:00 EEST)		Report	Ivanova 3' (o.g.); Di. Silva 5', 57'; Gomes 71'; C. Costa 76' (pen.)	Referee: Alina Peşu (Romania)

25 November 2023 FIFA Women's World Cup qualification– UEFAGroup H	Portugal	4–0	Israel	Faro
	Mendes 27', 43', 54'; Gomes 49'	Report		Stadium: Estádio de São Luís; Referee: Jelena Pejković (Croatia)

30 November 2023 FIFA Women's World Cup qualification– UEFAGroup H	Portugal	1–3	Germany	Faro
	Frohms 34' (o.g.)	Report	Schüller 15'; Huth 23'; Leupolz 28'	Stadium: Estádio de São Luís; Referee: Rebecca Welch (England)

=== 2022 ===
16 February 2022 Algarve Cup	Norway	0–2	Portugal	Lagos, Portugal
		Report	Pinto 22'; Mendes 90+4'	Stadium: Estádio Municipal de Lagos

20 February 2022 Algarve Cup	Portugal	0–4	Sweden	Algarve, Portugal
			Glas 56'; Ilestedt 60'; Asllani 74'; Blackstenius 76'	Stadium: Estádio Algarve

23 February 2022 Algarve Cup	Portugal	0–2	Norway	Algarve, Portugal
			Terland 20'; Ildhusøy 79'	Stadium: Estádio Algarve

9 April 2023 FIFA Women's World Cup qualification– UEFAGroup H	Germany	3–0	Portugal	Bielefeld, Germany
16:10	Oberdorf 40'; Bühl 55'; Rauch 80'	Report		Stadium: Bielefelder Alm; Attendance: 7,364; Referee: Lina Lehtovaara (Finland)

12 April 2023 FIFA Women's World Cup qualification– UEFAGroup H	Portugal	3–0	Bulgaria	Barcelos, Portugal
19:00	Di. Silva 18'; Marques 26'; C. Costa 42'	Report		Stadium: Estádio Cidade de Barcelos; Referee: Ivana Martinčić (Croatia)

22 June Friendly	Portugal	4–0	Greece	Lisbon, Portugal
				Stadium: Estadio do Restelo

25 June Friendly	Portugal	1–0	Greece	Estoril, Portugal
				Stadium: Estadio Antonio Coimbra da Mota

28 June Friendly	Portugal	1–1	Australia	Estoril, Portugal
21:00 UTC+1	Encarnação 87'	Source	Ibini 73'	Stadium: Estádio António Coimbra da Mota; Referee: Victoria Beyer (France)

9 July UEFA Euro 2022 group stage	Portugal	2–2	Switzerland	Leigh, England
	Gomes 58'; J. Silva 65'	Report	Sow 2'; Kiwic 5'	Stadium: Leigh Sports Village; Attendance: 5,902; Referee: Jana Adámková (Czech Republic)

13 July UEFA Euro 2022 group stage	Netherlands	3–2	Portugal	Leigh, England
	Egurrola 7'; Van der Gragt 16'; Van de Donk 62'	Report	C. Costa 38' (pen.); Di. Silva 47'	Stadium: Leigh Sports Village; Attendance: 6,966; Referee: Ivana Martinčić (Croatia)

17 July UEFA Euro 2022 group stage	Sweden	5–0	Portugal	Leigh, England
	Angeldahl 21', 45'; C. Costa 45+7' (o.g.); Asllani 54' (pen.); Blackstenius 90+1'	Report		Stadium: Leigh Sports Village; Attendance: 7,118; Referee: Stéphanie Frappart (France)

2 September 2023 FIFA Women's World Cup qualification– UEFAGroup H	Serbia	1–2	Portugal	Stara Pazova
	Frajtović 6'	Report	Marchão 40'; Nazareth 45+2'	Stadium: Serbian FA Sports Center; Referee: Lina Lehtovaara (Finland)

6 September 2023 FIFA Women's World Cup qualification– UEFAGroup H	Portugal	4–0	Turkey	Vizela
	Encarnação 33'; Nazareth 36'; Tağ 49' (o.g.); Faria 79'	Report (FIFA); Report (UEFA)		Stadium: Estádio do FC Vizela; Referee: Jana Adámková (Czech Republic)

6 October 2023 FIFA Women's World Cup qualification– UEFA play-offs	Portugal	2–1	Belgium	Vizela
19:00 (18:00 WEST)	Di. Silva 29'; C. Costa 89'	Report (FIFA); Report (UEFA)	Wullaert 40' (pen.)	Stadium: Estádio do FC Vizela; Attendance: 2,645; Referee: Kateryna Monzul (Ukraine)

11 October 2023 FIFA Women's World Cup qualification – UEFA play-offs	Portugal	4–1 (a.e.t.)	Iceland	Paços de Ferreira, Portugal
	C. Costa 55' (pen.); Di. Silva 92'; T. Pinto 108'; Nazareth 120+1'	Report	Viggósdóttir 59'	Stadium: Estádio da Mata Real; Referee: Stéphanie Frappart (France)

11 November Friendly	Portugal	5–0	Haiti	Lisbon, Portugal

15 November Friendly	Portugal	1–0	Costa Rica

=== 2023 ===
17 February Friendly	New Zealand	0–5	Portugal	Hamilton, New Zealand
19:00 UTC+13		Report	J. Silva 17'; Do. Silva 42' (pen.); Capeta 63', 69'; T. Pinto 79'	Stadium: Waikato Stadium

22 February 2023 FIFA WWC qualification	Portugal	2–1	Cameroon	Hamilton, New Zealand
	D. Gomes 22'; C. Costa 90+4' (pen.)	Report	A. Nchout 89'	Stadium: Waikato Stadium

7 April Friendly	Portugal	1–2	Japan

11 April Friendly	Portugal	1–1	Wales

1 July Friendly	England	0–0	Portugal	Milton Keynes, England
15:15				Stadium: Stadium MK

7 July Friendly	Portugal	2–0	Ukraine

16 July Friendly	Portugal	1–2	Norway	Māngere, New Zealand
				Stadium: Centre Park

23 July World Cup GS	Netherlands	1–0	Portugal	Dunedin, New Zealand
19:30 UTC+12	Van der Gragt 13'	Report (FIFA)		Stadium: Forsyth Barr Stadium; Attendance: 11,991; Referee: Kateryna Monzul (Ukraine)

27 July World Cup GS	Portugal	2–0	Vietnam	Hamilton, New Zealand
19:30 UTC+12	Encarnação 7'; Nazareth 21'	Report (FIFA)		Stadium: Waikato Stadium; Attendance: 6,645; Referee: Salima Mukansanga (Rwanda)

1 August World Cup GS	Portugal	0–0	United States	Auckland, New Zealand
		Report (FIFA)		Stadium: Eden Park; Attendance: 40,958; Referee: Rebecca Welch (England)

22 September 2023–24 UEFA Nations League	France	2-0	Portugal	Valenciennes
21:10	Geyoro 27'; Bacha 89'	Report		Stadium: Stade du Hainaut, Referee: Tess Olofsson (Sweden)

26 September 2023–24 UEFA Nations League	Portugal	3–2	Norway	Estádio Cidade de Barcelos,
19:15 (18:15 WEST)	Jacinto 38'; Costa 44' (pen.), 69' (pen.)	Report	Maanum 33'; Terland 58'	Stadium: Barcelos; Referee: Ewa Augustyn (Poland)

27 October 2023–24 UEFA Women's Nations League	Austria	2–1	Portugal	Altach, Austria
18:00 CEST	Borges 63' (o.g.); Dunst 69'		Pinto 90+3'	Stadium: Stadion Schnabelholz; Attendance: 4,800; Referee: Maria Caputi (Italy)

31 October 2023–24 UEFA Women's Nations League	Portugal	1–2	Austria	Póvoa de Varzim, Portugal
18:15 WET (19:15 CET)	Capeta 75'		Pinther 72'; Campbell 75'	Stadium: Estádio do Varzim SC; Attendance: 3,598

1 December 2023–24 UEFA Nations League	Norway	4–0	Portugal	Oslo,
			Hegerberg 3', 8' (pen.), 49'; Román Haug 90+4'	Stadium: Ullevaal Stadion; Attendance: 2,383; Referee: Ivana Martinčić (Croatia)

5 December 2023–24 UEFA Nations League	Portugal	0–1	France	Leiria, Portugal
18:15 UTC+0		Report	Geyoro 90+3'	Stadium: Estádio Dr. Magalhães Pessoa; Attendance: 5,337; Referee: Ivana Projkovska (North Macedonia)

=== 2024 ===
21 February Friendly	Portugal	3–1	Czech Republic	Estoril, Portugal
18:15 UTC+0	Ana Capeta 2'; Carolina Mendes 4'; Joana Marchão 75'	Report	Michaela Khýrová 83'	Stadium: Estádio António Coimbra da Mota; Attendance: 2.000

27 February Friendly	Portugal	5–1	South Korea	Estoril, Portugal
18:15 UTC+0	Joana Marchão 18'; Andreia Faria 37'; Telma Encarnação 45'; Jéssica Silva 45+2', 52'	Report	Son Hwa-yeon 79'	Stadium: Estádio António Coimbra da Mota; Attendance: no data

5 April Euro 2025 qualifying	Portugal	3–0	Bosnia and Herzegovina	Leiria, Portugal
	Carole Costa 28'; Gloria Slišković 45+2' (o.g.); Diana Silva 62'	Report		Stadium: Estádio Dr. Magalhães Pessoa; Referee: Eleni Antoniou (Greece)

9 April Euro 2025 qualifying	Malta	0–2	Portugal	Ta' Qali, Malta
		Report	Carole Costa 48' (pen.); Ana Capeta 78'	Stadium: Centenary Stadium; Referee: Katalin Sipos (Hungary)

31 May Euro 2025 qualifying	Portugal	4–0	Northern Ireland	Leiria, Portugal
21:45 (20:45 UTC+1)	Carole Costa 25' (pen.); Lucia Alves 49', 90+6'; Catarina Amado 83'	Report		Stadium: Estádio Dr. Magalhães Pessoa; Attendance: 10,017; Referee: Tess Olofsson (Sweden)

4 June Euro 2025 qualifying	Northern Ireland	1–2	Portugal	Lurgan, Northern Ireland
20:00 (19:00 UTC+1)	Lauren Wade 5'	Report	Kika Nazareth 18'; Andreia Norton 30'	Stadium: Mourneview Park; Referee: Franziska Wildfeuer (Germany)

12 July Euro 2025 qualifying	Bosnia and Herzegovina	0–0	Portugal	Zenica, Bosnia and Herzegovina
19:00		Report		Stadium: Bilino Polje Stadium

16 July Euro 2025 qualifying	Portugal	3–1	Malta	Leiria, Portugal
19:00 (18:00 UTC+1)	Ana Capeta 7'; Stephanie Ribeiro 28'; Jéssica Silva 86'	Report	Maria Farrugia 16'	Stadium: Estádio Dr. Magalhães Pessoa

25 October 2024 Euro 2025 qualifying play-offs	Azerbaijan	1–4	Portugal	Baku, Azerbaijan
14:00 (16:00 UTC+4)	Nazlican Parlak 58'	Report	Ana Capeta 5'; Tatiana Pinto 10'; Diana Gomes 26'; Diana Silva 89'	Stadium: Dalga Arena; Attendance: 253; Referee: Fabienne Michel (Germany)

29 October 2024 Euro 2025 qualifying play-offs	Portugal	4–0 (8–1 agg.)	Azerbaijan	Vizela, Portugal
20:45 (19:45 UTC+0)	Diana Silva 15', 26'; Dolores Silva 57' (pen.); Fátima Pinto 86'	Report		Stadium: Estádio do Futebol Clube de Vizela; Attendance: 4,535; Referee: Shona Shukrula (Netherlands)

29 November 2024 Euro 2025 qualifying play-offs	Portugal	1–1	Czech Republic	Porto, Portugal
20:45 (19:45 UTC+0)	Kika Nazareth 47'	Report	Kateřina Svitková 33'	Stadium: Estádio do Dragão; Attendance: 40,189; Referee: Silvia Gasperotti (Italy)

3 December 2024 Euro 2025 qualifying play-offs	Czech Republic	1–2 (2–3 agg.)	Portugal	Teplice, Czech Republic
17:45	Kateřina Svitková 35' (pen.)	Report	Diana Silva 13', 76'	Stadium: Na Stínadlech; Attendance: 5,203; Referee: Lina Lehtovaara (Finland)

=== 2025 ===
21 February 2025 UEFA Nations League group stage	Portugal	1–1	England	Portimão, Portugal
19:45	Kika 75'	Report	Russo 15'	Stadium: Estádio Municipal de Portimão; Attendance: 3,221; Referee: Ivana Projkovska (North Macedonia)

26 February 2025 UEFA Women's Nations League	Belgium	0–1	Portugal	Leuven, Belgium
20:15		Report	Carole 50' (pen.)	Stadium: Den Dreef; Attendance: 3,836; Referee: Eleni Antoniou (Greece)

4 April 2025 UEFA Women's Nations League	Portugal	2–4	Spain	Paços de Ferreira, Portugal
19:45	Amado 27'; Carole 56' (pen.)	Report	Guijarro 25'; Aleixandri 40'; Pina 43'; Esther 89'	Stadium: Estádio Capital do Móvel; Attendance: 5,225; Referee: Iuliana Demetrescu (Romania)

8 April 2025 UEFA Women's Nations League	Spain	7–1	Portugal	Vigo, Spain
19:00	Paralluelo 2'; Bonmatí 8', 12'; Putellas 28', 51'; Caldentey 47'; Esther 60'	Report	Fonseca 71'	Stadium: Balaídos; Attendance: 15,526; Referee: Stéphanie Frappart (France)

30 May 2025 UEFA Women's Nations League	England	6–0	Portugal	London, England
19:45 UTC+1	Beever-Jones 3', 26', 33'; Bronze 5'; Mead 29'; Kelly 62'	Report		Stadium: Wembley Stadium; Attendance: 48,531; Referee: Frida Klarlund (Denmark)

3 June 2025 UEFA Women's Nations League	Portugal	0–3	Belgium	Funchal, Portugal
18:00		Report	Vanhaevermaet 37'; Wullaert 67' (pen.), 72'	Stadium: Estádio do Marítimo; Attendance: 5,675; Referee: Tess Olofsson (Sweden)

23 June Friendly	Portugal	0–0	Nigeria	Amadora, Portugal
19:00		Report		Stadium: Estádio José Gomes; Attendance: 9,288; Referee: Ainara Acevedo (Spain)

3 July UEFA Women's Euro 2025	Spain	5–0	Portugal	Bern, Switzerland
20:00	Esther 2', 43'; Vicky 7'; Alexia 41'; Martín-Prieto 90+3'	Report		Stadium: Stadion Wankdorf, Attendance: 29,520; Referee: Iuliana Demetrescu (Romania)

7 July UEFA Women's Euro 2025	Portugal	1–1	Italy	Geneva, Switzerland
20:00	Gomes 89'	Report	Girelli 70'	Stadium: Stade de Genève, Attendance: 22,713; Referee: Ivana Martinčić (Croatia)

11 July UEFA Women's Euro 2025	Portugal	1–2	Belgium	Sion, Switzerland
20:00	Encarnação 87'	Report	Wullaert 3'; Cayman 90+6'	Stadium: Stade de Tourbillon; Attendance: 7,515; Referee: Tess Olofsson (Sweden)

23 October Friendly	United States	1–2	Portugal	Chester, United States
01:00	Lavelle 1'	Report	Gomes 41'; Pinto 72'	Stadium: Subaru Park; Attendance: 17,297; Referee: Merlin Soto (Honduras)

26 October Friendly	United States	3–1	Portugal	East Hartford, United States
16:00 ET	Moultrie 1', 10'; Coffey 82'	Report	Silva 5'	Stadium: Pratt & Whitney Stadium; Attendance: 26,492; Referee: Karen Hernandez (Mexico)

28 November Friendly	Portugal	1–2	Netherlands	Braga, Portugal
20:45				Stadium: Estadio Municipal de Braga

2 December Friendly	Portugal	0–5	Brazil	Aveiro, Portugal
19:45 WET (UTC+0)		Report	Gabi Zanotti 1'; Ludmila 16'; Dudinha 37'; Isabela 73'; Bia Zaneratto 90' (pen.)	Stadium: Estádio Municipal de Aveiro; Attendance: 15,323; Referee: Riem Hussein (Germany)

=== 2026 ===
3 March 2027 FIFA Women's World Cup qualification	Portugal	2–0	Finland	Pacos de Ferreira, Portugal
18:45 (17:45 UTC)	Alves 90+1'; Santiago 90+4'	Report (FIFA); Report (UEFA)		Stadium: Estádio Capital do Móvel; Referee: Franziska Wildfeuer (Germany)

7 March 2027 FIFA Women's World Cup qualification	Portugal	4–0	Slovakia	Barcelos, Portugal
16:00 (15:00 UTC)	Capeta 19', 44'; Santiago 48'; J. Silva 74'	Report (FIFA); Report (UEFA)		Stadium: Estádio Cidade de Barcelos; Attendance: 5,156; Referee: Martina Molinaro (Italy)

14 April 2027 FIFA Women's World Cup qualification	Latvia	0–3	Portugal	Riga, Latvia
19:00 (20:00 UTC+3)		Report (FIFA); Report (UEFA)	Nazareth 14', 73'; T. Pinto 18'	Stadium: Daugava Stadium; Attendance: 533; Referee: Laura Mauricio (Switzerland)

18 April 2027 FIFA Women's World Cup qualification	Slovakia	1–2	Portugal	Prešov, Slovakia
16:00	Fabová 8'	Report (FIFA); Report (UEFA)	Santiago 37'; Nazareth 42'	Stadium: Futbal Tatran Arena; Referee: Maïka Vanderstichel (France)

5 June 2027 FIFA Women's World Cup qualification	Portugal	5–0	Latvia	Estoril, Portugal
20:00	Santiago 47'; Capeta 54'; Nazareth 61', 63'; Silva 84'	Report (FIFA); Report (UEFA)		Stadium: Estádio António Coimbra da Mota; Attendance: 2,531; Referee: Olivia Tschon (Austria)

9 June 2027 FIFA Women's World Cup qualification	Finland	3–1	Portugal	Tampere, Finland
20:00	Nyström 79'; Lehtola 47', 12'	Report (FIFA); Report (UEFA)	Nazareth 29'	Stadium: Tammelan Stadion; Attendance: 7,078; Referee: Merima Čelik (Bosnia and Herzegovina)

October 2027 FIFA Women's World Cup qualification	Northern Ireland	v	Portugal	Northern Ireland

October 2027 FIFA Women's World Cup qualification	Portugal	v	Northern Ireland	Portugal
