= 2021–22 in German football =

Football in Germany
- Season: 2021–22

Men's football
- Bundesliga: Bayern Munich
- 2. Bundesliga: Schalke 04
- 3. Liga: 1. FC Magdeburg
- DFB-Pokal: RB Leipzig
- DFL-Supercup: Bayern Munich

Women's football
- Frauen-Bundesliga: VfL Wolfsburg
- 2. Frauen-Bundesliga: SV Meppen
- DFB-Pokal: VfL Wolfsburg

The 2021–22 season was the 112th season of competitive football in Germany.

== Promotion and relegation ==
=== Pre-season ===
League	Promoted to league	Relegated from league
Bundesliga	VfL Bochum; Greuther Fürth	Werder Bremen; Schalke 04
2. Bundesliga	Dynamo Dresden; Hansa Rostock; FC Ingolstadt	VfL Osnabrück; Eintracht Braunschweig; Würzburger Kickers
3. Liga	Viktoria Berlin; Borussia Dortmund II; SC Freiburg II; TSV Havelse	KFC Uerdingen^{1}; Bayern Munich II; VfB Lübeck; SpVgg Unterhaching
Frauen-Bundesliga	Carl Zeiss Jena; 1. FC Köln	SV Meppen; MSV Duisburg
2. Frauen-Bundesliga	SV Elversberg; SV Henstedt-Ulzburg; 1. FC Nürnberg	Borussia Mönchengladbach; Turbine Potsdam II; Arminia Bielefeld; SpVg Berghofen; BV Cloppenburg; 1. FC Saarbrücken; Würzburger Kickers; 1. FFC 08 Niederkirchen

^1 KFC Uerdingen did not receive a 3. Liga license, sparing SV Meppen from relegation.

=== Post-season ===
League	Promoted to league	Relegated from league
Bundesliga	Schalke 04; Werder Bremen	Arminia Bielefeld; Greuther Fürth
2. Bundesliga	1. FC Magdeburg; Eintracht Braunschweig; 1. FC Kaiserslautern	Dynamo Dresden; Erzgebirge Aue; FC Ingolstadt
3. Liga	SpVgg Bayreuth; SV Elversberg; Rot-Weiss Essen; VfB Oldenburg	Viktoria Berlin; Würzburger Kickers; TSV Havelse; Türkgücü München
Frauen-Bundesliga	SV Meppen; MSV Duisburg	SC Sand; Carl Zeiss Jena
2. Frauen-Bundesliga	SC Freiburg II; 1. FC Köln II; Turbine Potsdam II	SV Elversberg; SV Henstedt-Ulzburg; Borussia Bocholt

== National teams ==
Win Draw Loss

=== Germany national football team ===
==== Kits ====
Home	Away alt. 1

==== 2022 FIFA World Cup qualification ====
===== 2022 FIFA World Cup qualification Group J =====
Pos	Team	Pld	W	D	L	GF	GA	GD	Pts	Qualification	Germany	North Macedonia	Romania	Armenia	Iceland	Liechtenstein
1	Germany	10	9	0	1	36	4	+32	27	Qualification for 2022 FIFA World Cup	—	1–2	2–1	6–0	3–0	9–0
2	North Macedonia	10	5	3	2	23	11	+12	18	Advance to play-offs	0–4	—	0–0	0–0	3–1	5–0
3	Romania	10	5	2	3	13	8	+5	17		0–1	3–2	—	1–0	0–0	2–0
4	Armenia	10	3	3	4	9	20	−11	12		1–4	0–5	3–2	—	2–0	1–1
5	Iceland	10	2	3	5	12	18	−6	9		0–4	2–2	0–2	1–1	—	4–0
6	Liechtenstein	10	0	1	9	2	34	−32	1		0–2	0–4	0–2	0–1	1–4	—

Source: FIFA, UEFA
Rules for classification: Tiebreakers

===== 2022 FIFA World Cup qualification fixtures and results =====
2 September 2021 2022 FIFA World Cup qualification	Liechtenstein	0–2	Germany	St. Gallen, Switzerland
20:45 (20:45 UTC+2)		Report	Werner 41'; Sané 77'	Stadium: Kybunpark; Attendance: 7,958; Referee: Fábio Veríssimo (Portugal)
Note: Liechtenstein played their home match against Germany at Kybunpark in St. Gallen, Switzerland, since their regular home stadium, the Rheinpark Stadion in Vaduz, is being renovated.

5 September 2021 2022 FIFA World Cup qualification	Germany	6–0	Armenia	Stuttgart
20:45 (20:45 UTC+2)	Gnabry 6', 15'; Reus 35'; Werner 45'; Hofmann 52'; Adeyemi 90+1'	Report		Stadium: Mercedes-Benz Arena; Attendance: 18,086; Referee: William Collum (Scotland)

8 September 2021 2022 FIFA World Cup qualification	Iceland	0–4	Germany	Reykjavík
20:45 (18:45 UTC±0)		Report	Gnabry 4'; Rüdiger 24'; Sané 56'; Werner 89'	Stadium: Laugardalsvöllur; Attendance: 3,505; Referee: Andreas Ekberg (Sweden)

8 October 2021 2022 FIFA World Cup qualification	Germany	2–1	Romania	Hamburg
20:45 (20:45 UTC+2)	Gnabry 52'; Müller 81'	Report	Hagi 9'	Stadium: Volksparkstadion; Referee: Cüneyt Çakır (Turkey)

11 October 2021 2022 FIFA World Cup qualification	North Macedonia	0–4	Germany	Skopje
20:45 (20:45 UTC+2)		Report	Havertz 50'; Werner 70', 73'; Musiala 83'	Stadium: Toše Proeski Arena; Attendance: 16,182; Referee: Danny Makkelie (Netherlands)

11 November 2021 2022 FIFA World Cup qualification	Germany	9–0	Liechtenstein	Wolfsburg
20:45 (20:45 UTC+1)	Gündoğan 11' (pen.); Kaufmann 20' (o.g.); Sané 22', 49'; Reus 23'; Müller 76', 86'; Baku 80'; Göppel 89' (o.g.)	Report		Stadium: Volkswagen Arena; Attendance: 25,984; Referee: Ivana Martinčić (Croatia)

14 November 2021 2022 FIFA World Cup qualification	Armenia	1–4	Germany	Yerevan
18:00 (21:00 UTC+4)	Mkhitaryan 59' (pen.)	Report	Havertz 15'; Gündoğan 45+4' (pen.), 50'; Hofmann 64'	Stadium: Vazgen Sargsyan Republican Stadium; Referee: François Letexier (France)

==== 2022–23 UEFA Nations League ====
===== 2022–23 UEFA Nations League A Group 3 =====
Pos	Team	Pld	W	D	L	GF	GA	GD	Pts	Qualification or relegation	(Italy)	(Hungary)	(Germany)	(England)
1	Italy	6	3	2	1	8	7	+1	11	Qualification for Nations League Finals	—	2–1	1–1	1–0
2	Hungary	6	3	1	2	8	5	+3	10		0–2	—	1–1	1–0
3	Germany	6	1	4	1	11	9	+2	7		5–2	0–1	—	1–1
4	England (R)	6	0	3	3	4	10	−6	3	Relegation to League B	0–0	0–4	3–3	—

Source: UEFA
Rules for classification: Tiebreakers
(R) Relegated

===== 2022–23 UEFA Nations League fixtures and results =====
4 June 2022 2022–23 UEFA Nations League A	Italy	1–1	Germany	Bologna
20:45 (20:45 UTC+2)	Pellegrini 70'	Report	Kimmich 73'	Stadium: Stadio Renato Dall'Ara; Attendance: 23,754; Referee: Srđan Jovanović (Serbia)

7 June 2022 2022–23 UEFA Nations League A	Germany	1–1	England	Munich
20:45 (20:45 UTC+2)	Hofmann 50'	Report	Kane 88' (pen.)	Stadium: Allianz Arena; Attendance: 66,289; Referee: Carlos del Cerro Grande (Spain)

11 June 2022 2022–23 UEFA Nations League A	Hungary	1–1	Germany	Budapest
20:45 (20:45 UTC+2)	Nagy 6'	Report	Hofmann 9'	Stadium: Puskás Aréna; Attendance: 55,948; Referee: José María Sánchez Martínez (Spain)

14 June 2022 2022–23 UEFA Nations League A	Germany	5–2	Italy	Mönchengladbach
20:45 (20:45 UTC+2)	Kimmich 10'; Gündoğan 45+4' (pen.); Müller 51'; Werner 68', 69'	Report	Gnonto 78'; Bastoni 90+4'	Stadium: Borussia-Park; Attendance: 44,144; Referee: István Kovács (Romania)

==== Friendly matches ====
26 March 2022 Friendly	Germany	2–0	Israel	Sinsheim
20:45 (20:45 UTC+1)	Havertz 36'; Werner 45+1'	Report		Stadium: Rhein-Neckar-Arena; Attendance: 25,600; Referee: Maurizio Mariani (Italy)

29 March 2022 Friendly	Netherlands	1–1	Germany	Amsterdam
20:45 (20:45 UTC+2)	Bergwijn 68'	Report	Müller 45+1'	Stadium: Johan Cruyff Arena; Attendance: 50,387; Referee: Craig Pawson (England)

=== Germany Olympic football team ===
==== 2020 Summer Olympics ====
Due to the COVID-19 pandemic, the games have been postponed to the summer of 2021. However, their official name remains 2020 Summer Olympics.

===== 2020 Summer Olympics Group D =====
Pos	Team	Pld	W	D	L	GF	GA	GD	Pts	Qualification
1	Brazil	3	2	1	0	7	3	+4	7	Advance to knockout stage
2	Ivory Coast	3	1	2	0	3	2	+1	5	Advance to knockout stage
3	Germany	3	1	1	1	6	7	−1	4	
4	Saudi Arabia	3	0	0	3	4	8	−4	0	

Source: TOCOG and FIFA
Rules for classification: Group stage tiebreakers

====== 2020 Summer Olympics fixtures and results ======
22 July 2021 Group D	Brazil	4–2	Germany	Yokohama, Japan
10:30 (17:30 UTC+9)	Richarlison 7', 22', 30'; Paulinho 90+5'	Report	Amiri 57'; Ache 84'	Stadium: International Stadium Yokohama; Attendance: 0 Referee: Iván Barton (El Salvador)

25 July 2021 Group D	Saudi Arabia	2–3	Germany	Yokohama, Japan
13:30 (20:30 UTC+9)	Al-Najei 30', 50'	Report	Amiri 11'; Ache 43'; Uduokhai 75'	Stadium: International Stadium Yokohama; Referee: Victor Gomes (South Africa)

28 July 2021 Group D	Germany	1–1	Ivory Coast	Rifu, Japan
10:00 (17:00 UTC+9)	Löwen 73'	Report	Henrichs 69' (o.g.)	Stadium: Miyagi Stadium; Referee: Leodán González (Uruguay)

=== Germany women's national football team ===
==== Kits ====
Home	Away

==== 2023 FIFA Women's World Cup qualification ====
===== 2023 FIFA Women's World Cup qualification Group H =====
Pos	Team	Pld	W	D	L	GF	GA	GD	Pts	Qualification	(Germany)	(Portugal)	(Serbia)	(Turkey)	(Israel)	(Bulgaria)
1	Germany	10	9	0	1	47	5	+42	27	2023 FIFA Women's World Cup	—	3–0	5–1	8–0	7–0	7–0
2	Portugal	10	7	1	2	26	9	+17	22	Play-offs	1–3	—	2–1	4–0	4–0	3–0
3	Serbia	10	7	0	3	26	14	+12	21		3–2	1–2	—	2–0	4–0	3–0
4	Turkey	10	3	1	6	9	26	−17	10		0–3	1–1	2–5	—	3–2	1–0
5	Israel	10	3	0	7	7	25	−18	9		0–1	0–4	0–2	1–0	—	2–0
6	Bulgaria	10	0	0	10	1	37	−36	0		0–8	0–5	1–4	0–2	0–2	—

Source: UEFA
Rules for classification: Tiebreakers

===== 2023 FIFA Women's World Cup qualification fixtures and results =====
18 September 2021 2023 Women's World Cup qualification	Germany	7–0	Bulgaria	Cottbus
16:10	Schüller 21', 72'; Magull 24', 33'; Dallmann 67', 82'; Waßmuth 76'	Report		Stadium: Stadion der Freundschaft; Referee: Ivana Projkovska (North Macedonia)

21 September 2021 2023 Women's World Cup qualification	Germany	5–1	Serbia	Chemnitz
16:00	Schüller 49', 54', 71', 77'; Leupolz 79'	Report	Matejić 3'	Stadium: Stadion an der Gellertstraße; Attendance: 1,604; Referee: Kirsty Dowle (England)

21 October 2021 2023 Women's World Cup qualification	Israel	0–1	Germany	Petah Tikva
18:00		Report	Huth 18'	Stadium: HaMoshava Stadium; Referee: Tanja Subotič (Slovenia)

26 October 2021 2023 Women's World Cup qualification	Germany	7–0	Israel	Essen
16:05	Brand 20', 45'; Däbritz 26'; Freigang 43'; Magull 56'; Waßmuth 71'; Rauch 78'	Report		Stadium: Stadion Essen; Attendance: 1,814; Referee: Elvira Nurmustafina (Kazakhstan)

26 November 2021 2023 Women's World Cup qualification	Germany	8–0	Turkey	Braunschweig
16:00	Tağ 1' (o.g.); Schüller 10', 11', 67'; Brand 62'; Freigang 74'; Nüsken 80'; Bühl 87'	Report		Stadium: Eintracht-Stadion; Attendance: 2,583; Referee: Aleksandra Česen (Slovenia)

30 November 2021 2023 Women's World Cup qualification	Portugal	1–3	Germany	Faro
19:00	Frohms 34' (o.g.)	Report	Schüller 15'; Huth 23'; Leupolz 28'	Stadium: Estádio de São Luís; Referee: Rebecca Welch (England)

9 April 2022 2023 Women's World Cup qualification	Germany	3–0	Portugal	Bielefeld
16:10	Oberdorf 40'; Bühl 55'; Rauch 80'	Report		Stadium: Bielefelder Alm; Attendance: 7,364; Referee: Lina Lehtovaara (Finland)

12 April 2022 2023 Women's World Cup qualification	Serbia	3–2	Germany	Stara Pazova
16:00	Poljak 36'; Damnjanović 49', 69'	Report	Schüller 60'; Waßmuth 90+2'	Stadium: Serbian FA Sports Center; Referee: Tess Olofsson (Sweden)

==== 2022 Arnold Clark Cup ====
Pos	Team	Pld	W	D	L	GF	GA	GD	Pts
1	England (H, C)	3	1	2	0	4	2	+2	5
2	Spain	3	1	2	0	2	1	+1	5
3	Canada	3	1	1	1	2	2	0	4
4	Germany	3	0	1	2	2	5	−3	1

Source: BBC
Rules for classification: 1) points; 2) goal difference; 3) goals scored; 4) head-to-head result; 5) fair play ranking.
(C) Champions; (H) Hosts

17 February 2022 2022 Arnold Clark Cup	Germany	1–1	Spain	Middlesbrough, England
14:30	Schüller 88'	Report	Putellas 46'	Stadium: Riverside Stadium; Attendance: 249; Referee: Tess Oloffson (Sweden)

20 February 2022 2022 Arnold Clark Cup	Canada	1–0	Germany	Norwich, England
20:15	Gilles 7'	Report		Stadium: Carrow Road; Attendance: 119; Referee: Emikar Caldera (Venezuela)

23 February 2022 2022 Arnold Clark Cup	England	3–1	Germany	Wolverhampton
19:30	White 15'; Bright 84'; Kirby 90+4'	Report	Magull 41'	Stadium: Molineux Stadium, England; Attendance: 14,463; Referee: Lina Lehtovaara (Finland)

==== Friendly matches ====
24 June 2022 Friendly	Germany	7–0	Switzerland	Erfurt
17:00	Bühl 6', 61', 66'; Magull 41'; Dallmann 81'; Brand 89'; Lohmann 90+5'	Report		Stadium: Steigerwaldstadion; Referee: Kirsty Dowle (England)

== League season ==
=== Men ===
==== Bundesliga ====
===== Bundesliga standings =====
Pos	Team	Pld	W	D	L	GF	GA	GD	Pts	Qualification or relegation
1	Bayern Munich (C)	34	24	5	5	97	37	+60	77	Qualification for the Champions League group stage
2	Borussia Dortmund	34	22	3	9	85	52	+33	69	Qualification for the Champions League group stage
3	Bayer Leverkusen	34	19	7	8	80	47	+33	64	Qualification for the Champions League group stage
4	RB Leipzig	34	17	7	10	72	37	+35	58	Qualification for the Champions League group stage
5	Union Berlin	34	16	9	9	50	44	+6	57	Qualification for the Europa League group stage (Note: Since the 2021–22 DFB-Pokal winners, RB Leipzig, qualified for the Champions League based on league position, the Europa League group stage spot was passed to the sixth-placed team, and the Europa Conference League play-off round spot was passed to the seventh-placed team.)
6	SC Freiburg	34	15	10	9	58	46	+12	55	Qualification for the Europa League group stage
7	1. FC Köln	34	14	10	10	52	49	+3	52	Qualification for the Europa Conference League play-off round
8	Mainz 05	34	13	7	14	50	45	+5	46	
9	1899 Hoffenheim	34	13	7	14	58	60	−2	46	
10	Borussia Mönchengladbach	34	12	9	13	54	61	−7	45	
11	Eintracht Frankfurt	34	10	12	12	45	49	−4	42	Qualification for the Champions League group stage (Note: Eintracht Frankfurt qualified for the Champions League group stage by winning the UEFA Europa League.)
12	VfL Wolfsburg	34	12	6	16	43	54	−11	42	
13	VfL Bochum	34	12	6	16	38	52	−14	42	
14	FC Augsburg	34	10	8	16	39	56	−17	38	
15	VfB Stuttgart	34	7	12	15	41	59	−18	33	
16	Hertha BSC (O)	34	9	6	19	37	71	−34	33	Qualification for the relegation play-offs
17	Arminia Bielefeld (R)	34	5	13	16	27	53	−26	28	Relegation to 2. Bundesliga
18	Greuther Fürth (R)	34	3	9	22	28	82	−54	18	Relegation to 2. Bundesliga

Source: DFB
Rules for classification: 1) Points; 2) Goal difference; 3) Goals scored; 4) Head-to-head results; 5) Head-to-head away goals scored; 6) Away goals scored; 7) Play-off.
(C) Champions; (O) Play-off winners; (R) Relegated

==== 2. Bundesliga ====
===== 2. Bundesliga standings =====
Pos	Team	Pld	W	D	L	GF	GA	GD	Pts	Promotion, qualification or relegation
1	Schalke 04 (C, P)	34	20	5	9	72	44	+28	65	Promotion to Bundesliga
2	Werder Bremen (P)	34	18	9	7	65	43	+22	63	Promotion to Bundesliga
3	Hamburger SV	34	16	12	6	67	35	+32	60	Qualification for promotion play-offs
4	Darmstadt 98	34	18	6	10	71	46	+25	60	
5	FC St. Pauli	34	16	9	9	61	46	+15	57	
6	1. FC Heidenheim	34	15	7	12	43	45	−2	52	
7	SC Paderborn	34	13	12	9	56	44	+12	51	
8	1. FC Nürnberg	34	14	9	11	49	49	0	51	
9	Holstein Kiel	34	12	9	13	46	54	−8	45	
10	Fortuna Düsseldorf	34	11	11	12	45	42	+3	44	
11	Hannover 96	34	11	9	14	35	49	−14	42	
12	Karlsruher SC	34	9	14	11	54	55	−1	41	
13	Hansa Rostock	34	10	11	13	41	52	−11	41	
14	SV Sandhausen	34	10	11	13	42	54	−12	41	
15	Jahn Regensburg	34	10	10	14	50	51	−1	40	
16	Dynamo Dresden (R)	34	7	11	16	33	46	−13	32	Qualification for relegation play-offs
17	Erzgebirge Aue (R)	34	6	8	20	32	72	−40	26	Relegation to 3. Liga
18	FC Ingolstadt (R)	34	4	9	21	30	65	−35	21	Relegation to 3. Liga

Source: DFB
Rules for classification: 1) Points; 2) Goal difference; 3) Goals scored; 4) Head-to-head points; 5) Head-to-head goal difference; 6) Head-to-head away goals scored; 7) Away goals scored; 8) Play-off.
(C) Champions; (P) Promoted; (R) Relegated

==== 3. Liga ====
===== 3. Liga standings =====
Pos	Team	Pld	W	D	L	GF	GA	GD	Pts	Promotion, qualification or relegation
1	1. FC Magdeburg (C, P)	36	24	6	6	83	39	+44	78	Promotion to 2. Bundesliga and qualification for DFB-Pokal
2	Eintracht Braunschweig (P)	36	18	10	8	61	36	+25	64	Promotion to 2. Bundesliga and qualification for DFB-Pokal
3	1. FC Kaiserslautern (O, P)	36	18	9	9	56	27	+29	63	Qualification for promotion play-offs and DFB-Pokal
4	1860 Munich	36	17	10	9	67	50	+17	61	Qualification for DFB-Pokal
5	Waldhof Mannheim	36	16	12	8	58	40	+18	60	
6	VfL Osnabrück	36	16	10	10	56	48	+8	58	
7	1. FC Saarbrücken	36	14	11	11	50	44	+6	53	
8	Wehen Wiesbaden	36	14	9	13	49	44	+5	51	
9	Borussia Dortmund II (Note: Reserve teams are ineligible for promotion or DFB-Pokal qualification.)	36	14	7	15	51	48	+3	49	
10	FSV Zwickau	36	11	14	11	46	44	+2	47	
11	SC Freiburg II	36	12	11	13	34	42	−8	47	
12	SV Meppen	36	13	8	15	47	60	−13	47	
13	Viktoria Köln	36	12	9	15	39	52	−13	45	
14	Hallescher FC	36	10	13	13	46	48	−2	43	
15	MSV Duisburg	36	13	3	20	46	71	−25	42	
16	SC Verl	36	10	10	16	56	66	−10	40	
17	Viktoria Berlin (R)	36	10	7	19	44	62	−18	37	Relegation to Regionalliga
18	Würzburger Kickers (R)	36	7	9	20	34	59	−25	30	Relegation to Regionalliga
19	TSV Havelse (R)	36	5	8	23	28	71	−43	23	Relegation to Regionalliga
20	Türkgücü München (Note: Türkgücü München were deducted eleven points, nine after they filed for insolvency and two more for condition mistakes. On 24 March 2022, after the 31st matchday, Türkgücü München ceased to play for financial reasons. All their results were expunged. At the time, they were ranked 20th with 8 wins, 8 draws, 15 losses, 30–47 goals, and 21 points (after the deduction).) (R)	0	0	0	0	0	0	0	0	Results expunged

Source: DFB
Rules for classification: 1) Points; 2) Goal difference; 3) Goals scored; 4) Head-to-head results; 5) Head-to-head away goals scored; 6) Away goals scored; 7) Play-off.
(C) Champions; (O) Play-off winners; (P) Promoted; (R) Relegated

=== Women ===
==== Frauen-Bundesliga ====
===== Frauen-Bundesliga standings =====
Pos	Team	Pld	W	D	L	GF	GA	GD	Pts	Qualification or relegation
1	VfL Wolfsburg (C)	22	19	2	1	82	16	+66	59	Qualification for Champions League group stage
2	Bayern Munich	22	18	1	3	78	18	+60	55	Qualification for Champions League second round
3	Eintracht Frankfurt	22	15	1	6	49	26	+23	46	Qualification for Champions League first round
4	Turbine Potsdam	22	13	4	5	52	29	+23	43	
5	1899 Hoffenheim	22	12	5	5	56	32	+24	41	
6	SC Freiburg	22	9	5	8	40	31	+9	32	
7	Bayer Leverkusen	22	6	4	12	31	50	−19	22	
8	1. FC Köln	22	5	7	10	22	45	−23	22	
9	Werder Bremen	22	4	6	12	9	46	−37	18	
10	SGS Essen	22	4	5	13	23	41	−18	17	
11	SC Sand (R)	22	3	4	15	16	45	−29	13	Relegation to 2. Bundesliga
12	Carl Zeiss Jena (R)	22	1	2	19	9	88	−79	5	Relegation to 2. Bundesliga

Source: DFB
Rules for classification: 1) Points; 2) Goal difference; 3) Goals scored; 4) Head-to-head points; 5) Head-to-head goal difference; 6) Head-to-head goals scored; 7) Head-to-head away goals scored; 8) Away goals scored; 9) Play-off.
(C) Champions; (R) Relegated

==== 2. Frauen-Bundesliga ====
===== 2. Frauen-Bundesliga standings =====
Pos	Team	Pld	W	D	L	GF	GA	GD	Pts	Qualification or relegation
1	SV Meppen (Note: The Bayern Munich v SV Meppen match from 1 May 2022, originally ended in a 2–0 win for Munich, was counted as a 2–0 win for Meppen afterwards after Munich fielded an ineligible player.) (C, P)	26	19	4	3	64	20	+44	61	Promotion to Bundesliga
2	MSV Duisburg (P)	26	19	3	4	59	26	+33	60	Promotion to Bundesliga
3	RB Leipzig	26	17	2	7	70	46	+24	53	
4	SG Andernach	26	14	5	7	54	33	+21	47	
5	Eintracht Frankfurt II (Note: Reserve teams cannot compete in the Frauen-Bundesliga and are therefore ineligible for promotion.)	26	12	7	7	56	38	+18	43	
6	1. FC Nürnberg	26	13	2	11	47	43	+4	41	
7	Bayern Munich II	26	12	3	11	43	47	−4	39	
8	FSV Gütersloh	26	9	5	12	45	46	−1	32	
9	1899 Hoffenheim II	26	7	7	12	28	38	−10	28	
10	VfL Wolfsburg II	26	7	7	12	26	41	−15	28	
11	FC Ingolstadt	26	8	3	15	52	56	−4	27	
12	SV Elversberg (R)	26	6	4	16	25	57	−32	22	Relegation to Regionalliga
13	SV Henstedt-Ulzburg (R)	26	5	4	17	36	74	−38	19	Relegation to Regionalliga
14	Borussia Bocholt (R)	26	5	2	19	31	71	−40	17	Relegation to Regionalliga

Source: DFB
Rules for classification: 1) Points; 2) Goal difference; 3) Goals scored; 4) Head-to-head points; 5) Head-to-head goal difference; 6) Head-to-head goals scored; 7) Head-to-head away goals scored; 8) Away goals scored; 9) Play-off.
(C) Champions; (P) Promoted; (R) Relegated

== Cup competitions ==
=== Men ===
==== DFB-Pokal ====
===== Final =====
21 May 2022
20:00 CEST

SC Freiburg	1–1 (a.e.t.)	RB Leipzig
Eggestein 19'	Report	Nkunku 76'
Penalties
Petersen (penalty scored); Günter (penalty missed); K. Schlotterbeck (penalty scored); Demirović (penalty missed)	2–4	(penalty scored) Nkunku; (penalty scored) Orbán; (penalty scored) Olmo; (penalty scored) Henrichs

Olympiastadion, Berlin
Attendance: 74,322
Referee: Sascha Stegemann (Niederkassel)

==== DFL-Supercup ====
17 August 2021
20:30 CEST

Borussia Dortmund	1–3	Bayern Munich
Reus 64'	Report	Lewandowski 41', 74'; Müller 49'

Signal Iduna Park, Dortmund
Attendance: 24,742
Referee: Sascha Stegemann (Niederkassel)

=== Women ===
==== DFB-Pokal Frauen ====
28 May 2022
16:45

VfL Wolfsburg	4–0	Turbine Potsdam
Pajor 11', 32'; Roord 42'; Janssen 69'	Report

RheinEnergieStadion, Cologne
Attendance: 17,531
Referee: Karoline Wacker

== German clubs in Europe ==
=== UEFA Champions League ===
==== Group stage ====
===== Group A =====
Pos	Team	Pld	W	D	L	GF	GA	GD	Pts	Qualification	MCI	PAR	RBL	BRU
1	(England) Manchester City	6	4	0	2	18	10	+8	12	Advance to knockout phase	—	2–1	6–3	4–1
2	(France) Paris Saint-Germain	6	3	2	1	13	8	+5	11	Advance to knockout phase	2–0	—	3–2	4–1
3	(Germany) RB Leipzig	6	2	1	3	15	14	+1	7	Transfer to Europa League	2–1	2–2	—	1–2
4	(Belgium) Club Brugge	6	1	1	4	6	20	−14	4		1–5	1–1	0–5	—

Source: UEFA

===== Group C =====
Pos	Team	Pld	W	D	L	GF	GA	GD	Pts	Qualification	AJX	SPO	DOR	BES
1	(Netherlands) Ajax	6	6	0	0	20	5	+15	18	Advance to knockout phase	—	4–2	4–0	2–0
2	(Portugal) Sporting CP	6	3	0	3	14	12	+2	9 (Note: Tied on head-to-head points. Head-to-head goal difference: Sporting CP +1, Borussia Dortmund −1.)	Advance to knockout phase	1–5	—	3–1	4–0
3	(Germany) Borussia Dortmund	6	3	0	3	10	11	−1	9	Transfer to Europa League	1–3	1–0	—	5–0
4	(Turkey) Beşiktaş	6	0	0	6	3	19	−16	0		1–2	1–4	1–2	—

Source: UEFA

===== Group E =====
Pos	Team	Pld	W	D	L	GF	GA	GD	Pts	Qualification	BAY	BEN	BAR	DKV
1	(Germany) Bayern Munich	6	6	0	0	22	3	+19	18	Advance to knockout phase	—	5–2	3–0	5–0
2	(Portugal) Benfica	6	2	2	2	7	9	−2	8	Advance to knockout phase	0–4	—	3–0	2–0
3	(Spain) Barcelona	6	2	1	3	2	9	−7	7	Transfer to Europa League	0–3	0–0	—	1–0
4	(Ukraine) Dynamo Kyiv	6	0	1	5	1	11	−10	1		1–2	0–0	0–1	—

Source: UEFA

===== Group G =====
Pos	Team	Pld	W	D	L	GF	GA	GD	Pts	Qualification	LIL	SAL	SEV	WOL
1	(France) Lille	6	3	2	1	7	4	+3	11	Advance to knockout phase	—	1–0	0–0	0–0
2	(Austria) Red Bull Salzburg	6	3	1	2	8	6	+2	10	Advance to knockout phase	2–1	—	1–0	3–1
3	(Spain) Sevilla	6	1	3	2	5	5	0	6	Transfer to Europa League	1–2	1–1	—	2–0
4	(Germany) VfL Wolfsburg	6	1	2	3	5	10	−5	5		1–3	2–1	1–1	—

Source: UEFA

==== Knockout phase ====
===== Round of 16 =====
Team 1	Agg.	Team 2	1st leg	2nd leg
Red Bull Salzburg (Austria)	2–8	(Germany) Bayern Munich	1–1	1–7

===== Quarter-finals =====
Team 1	Agg.	Team 2	1st leg	2nd leg
Villarreal (Spain)	2–1	(Germany) Bayern Munich	1–0	1–1

=== UEFA Europa League ===
==== Group stage ====
===== Group D =====
Pos	Team	Pld	W	D	L	GF	GA	GD	Pts	Qualification	FRA	OLY	FEN	ANT
1	(Germany) Eintracht Frankfurt	6	3	3	0	10	6	+4	12	Advance to round of 16	—	3–1	1–1	2–2
2	(Greece) Olympiacos	6	3	0	3	8	7	+1	9	Advance to knockout round play-offs	1–2	—	1–0	2–1
3	(Turkey) Fenerbahçe	6	1	3	2	7	8	−1	6	Transfer to Europa Conference League	1–1	0–3	—	2–2
4	(Belgium) Antwerp	6	1	2	3	6	10	−4	5		0–1	1–0	0–3	—

Source: UEFA

===== Group G =====
Pos	Team	Pld	W	D	L	GF	GA	GD	Pts	Qualification	LEV	BET	CEL	FER
1	(Germany) Bayer Leverkusen	6	4	1	1	14	5	+9	13	Advance to round of 16	—	4–0	3–2	2–1
2	(Spain) Real Betis	6	3	1	2	12	12	0	10	Advance to knockout round play-offs	1–1	—	4–3	2–0
3	(Scotland) Celtic	6	3	0	3	13	15	−2	9	Transfer to Europa Conference League	0–4	3–2	—	2–0
4	(Hungary) Ferencváros	6	1	0	5	5	12	−7	3		1–0	1–3	2–3	—

Source: UEFA

==== Knockout phase ====
===== Knockout round play-offs =====
Team 1	Agg.	Team 2	1st leg	2nd leg
RB Leipzig (Germany)	5–3	(Spain) Real Sociedad	2–2	3–1
Borussia Dortmund (Germany)	4–6	(Scotland) Rangers	2–4	2–2

===== Round of 16 =====
Team 1	Agg.	Team 2	1st leg	2nd leg
Atalanta (Italy)	4–2	(Germany) Bayer Leverkusen	3–2	1–0
Real Betis (Spain)	2–3	(Germany) Eintracht Frankfurt	1–2	1–1 (a.e.t.)
RB Leipzig (Germany)	w/o (Note: RB Leipzig won on walkover as UEFA suspended Spartak Moscow due to the Russian invasion of Ukraine.)	(Russia) Spartak Moscow	Canc.	Canc.

===== Quarter-finals =====
Team 1	Agg.	Team 2	1st leg	2nd leg
RB Leipzig (Germany)	3–1	(Italy) Atalanta	1–1	2–0
Eintracht Frankfurt (Germany)	4–3	(Spain) Barcelona	1–1	3–2

===== Semi-finals =====
Team 1	Agg.	Team 2	1st leg	2nd leg
RB Leipzig (Germany)	2–3	(Scotland) Rangers	1–0	1–3
West Ham United (England)	1–3	(Germany) Eintracht Frankfurt	1–2	0–1

===== Final =====
18 May 2022
21:00 UTC+2

Eintracht Frankfurt (Germany)	1–1 (a.e.t.)	(Scotland) Rangers
Borré 69'	Report	Aribo 57'
Penalties
Lenz (penalty scored); Hrustic (penalty scored); Kamada (penalty scored); Kostić (penalty scored); Borré (penalty scored)	5–4	(penalty scored) Tavernier; (penalty scored) Davis; (penalty scored) Arfield; (penalty missed) Ramsey; (penalty scored) Roofe

Estadio Ramón Sánchez Pizjuán, Seville
Attendance: 38,842
Referee: Slavko Vinčić (Slovenia)

=== UEFA Europa Conference League ===
==== Qualifying phase and play-off round ====
===== Play-off round =====
Team 1	Agg.	Team 2	1st leg	2nd leg
KuPS (Finland)	0–4	(Germany) Union Berlin	0–4	0–0

==== Group stage ====
===== Group E =====
Pos	Team	Pld	W	D	L	GF	GA	GD	Pts	Qualification	FEY	SLA	UNI	MHA
1	(Netherlands) Feyenoord	6	4	2	0	11	6	+5	14	Advance to round of 16	—	2–1	3–1	2–1
2	(Czech Republic) Slavia Prague	6	2	2	2	8	7	+1	8	Advance to knockout round play-offs	2–2	—	3–1	1–0
3	(Germany) Union Berlin	6	2	1	3	8	9	−1	7		1–2	1–1	—	3–0
4	(Israel) Maccabi Haifa	6	1	1	4	2	7	−5	4		0–0	1–0	0–1	—

Source: UEFA

=== UEFA Women's Champions League ===
==== Qualifying rounds ====
===== Round 1 =====
====== Semi-finals ======
Team 1	Score	Team 2
1899 Hoffenheim (Germany)	1–0	(Iceland) Valur

====== Final ======
Team 1	Score	Team 2
1899 Hoffenheim (Germany)	2–0	(Italy) Milan

===== Round 2 =====
Team 1	Agg.	Team 2	1st leg	2nd leg
VfL Wolfsburg (Germany)	5–5 (3–0 p)	(France) Bordeaux	3–2	2–3 (a.e.t.)
Rosengård (Sweden)	3–6	(Germany) 1899 Hoffenheim	0–3	3–3

==== Group stage ====
===== Group A =====
Pos	Team	Pld	W	D	L	GF	GA	GD	Pts	Qualification	WOL	JUV	CHE	SER
1	(Germany) VfL Wolfsburg	6	3	2	1	17	7	+10	11 (Note: Head-to-head points: Wolfsburg 5, Juventus 5, Chelsea 5. Head-to-head goal differences: Wolfsburg +2, Juventus +1, Chelsea −3.)	Advance to Quarter-finals	—	0–2	4–0	5–0
2	(Italy) Juventus	6	3	2	1	12	4	+8	11	Advance to Quarter-finals	2–2	—	1–2	4–0
3	(England) Chelsea	6	3	2	1	13	8	+5	11		3–3	0–0	—	1–0
4	(Switzerland) Servette Chênois	6	0	0	6	0	23	−23	0		0–3	0–3	0–7	—

Source: UEFA

===== Group C =====
Pos	Team	Pld	W	D	L	GF	GA	GD	Pts	Qualification	BAR	ARS	HOF	KOG
1	(Spain) Barcelona	6	6	0	0	24	1	+23	18	Advance to Quarter-finals	—	4–1	4–0	5–0
2	(England) Arsenal	6	3	0	3	14	13	+1	9 (Note: Head-to-head points: Arsenal 3, 1899 Hoffenheim 3. Head-to-head goal differences: Arsenal +1, 1899 Hoffenheim −1.)	Advance to Quarter-finals	0–4	—	4–0	3–0
3	(Germany) 1899 Hoffenheim	6	3	0	3	11	15	−4	9		0–5	4–1	—	5–0
4	(Denmark) Køge	6	0	0	6	2	22	−20	0		0–2	1–5	1–2	—

Source: UEFA

===== Group D =====
Pos	Team	Pld	W	D	L	GF	GA	GD	Pts	Qualification	LYO	BAY	BEN	HAK
1	(France) Lyon	6	5	0	1	19	2	+17	15	Advance to Quarter-finals	—	2–1	5–0	4–0
2	(Germany) Bayern Munich	6	4	1	1	15	3	+12	13	Advance to Quarter-finals	1–0	—	4–0	4–0
3	(Portugal) Benfica	6	1	1	4	2	16	−14	4		0–5	0–0	—	0–1
4	(Sweden) BK Häcken	6	1	0	5	3	18	−15	3		0–3	1–5	1–2	—

Source: UEFA

==== Knockout phase ====
===== Quarter-finals =====
Team 1	Agg.	Team 2	1st leg	2nd leg
Bayern Munich (Germany)	3–4	(France) Paris Saint-Germain	1–2	2–2 (a.e.t.)
Arsenal (England)	1–3	(Germany) VfL Wolfsburg	1–1	0–2

===== Semi-finals =====
Team 1	Agg.	Team 2	1st leg	2nd leg
Barcelona (Spain)	5–3	(Germany) VfL Wolfsburg	5–1	0–2
