= 2023 FIFA Women's World Cup qualification – UEFA Group H =

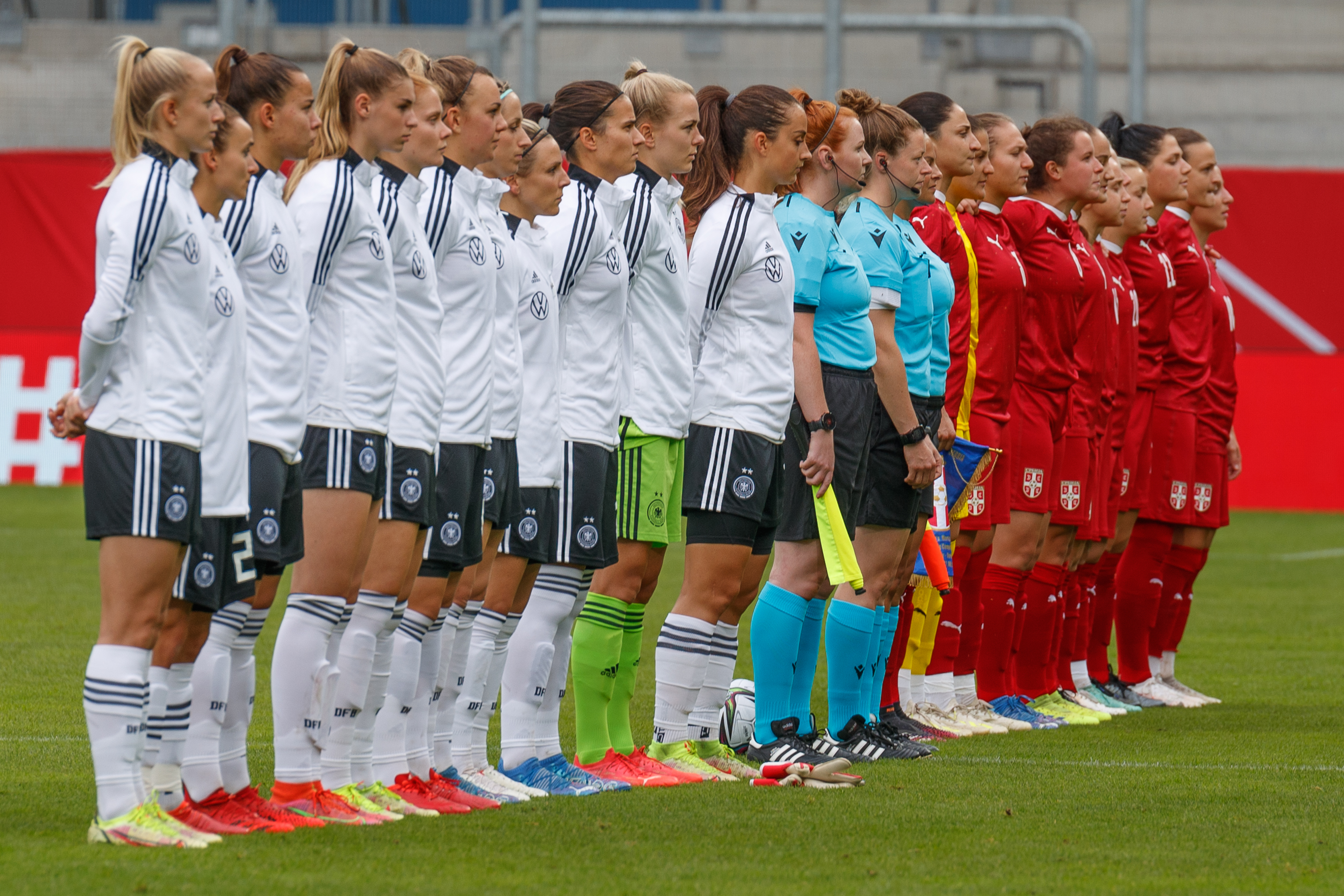
The national teams of Germany and Serbia in the qualifiers 2021.

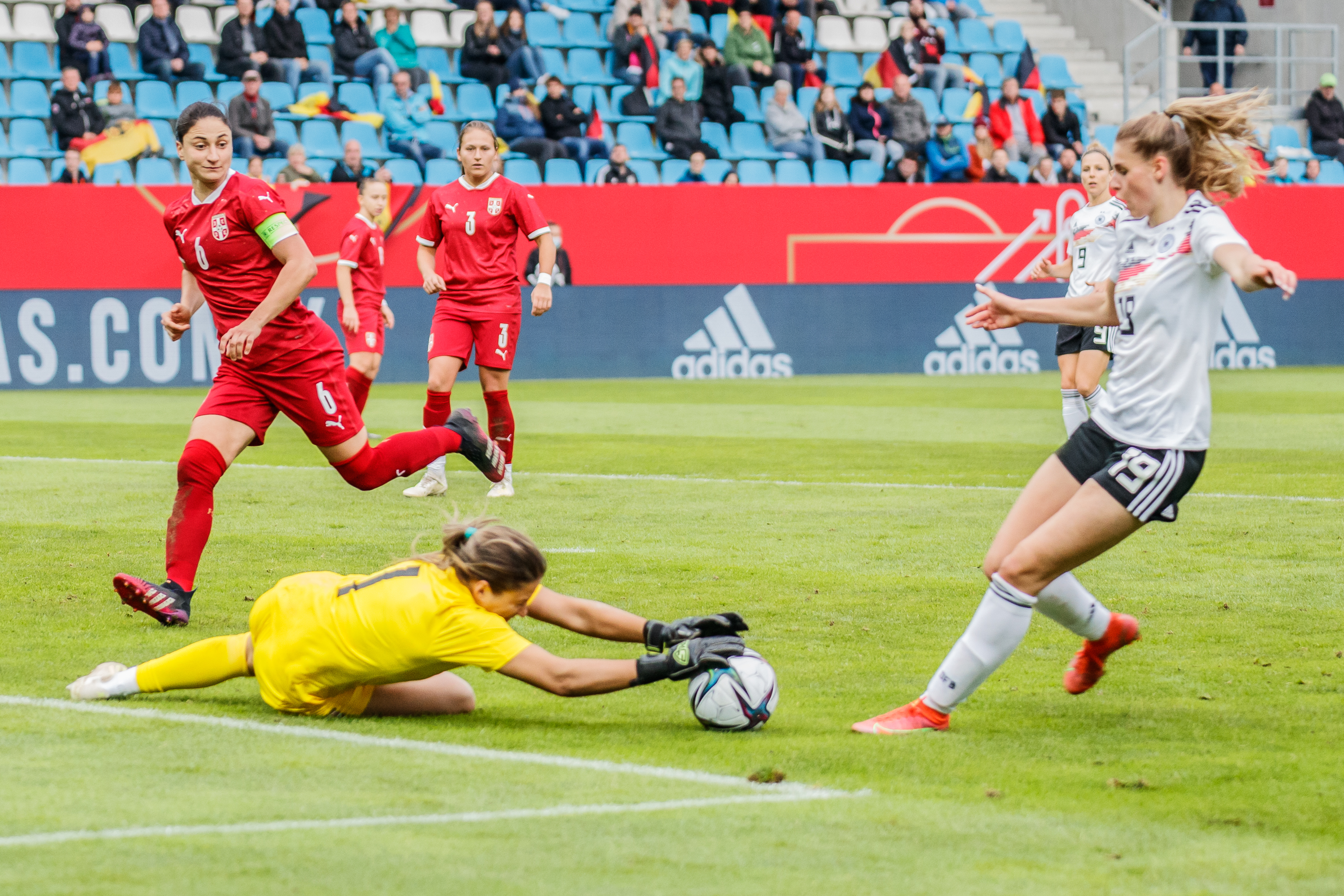
Milica Kostić and Jule Brand in action, 2021.

UEFA Group H of the 2023 FIFA Women's World Cup qualification competition consists of six teams: Germany, Portugal, Serbia, Israel, Turkey, and Bulgaria. The composition of the nine groups in the qualifying group stage was decided by the draw held on 30 April 2021, with the teams seeded according to their coefficient ranking.

The group is played in home-and-away round-robin format between 16 September 2021 and 6 September 2022, with a pause for the Women's Euro 2022 in July. The group winners qualify for the final tournament, while the runners-up advance to the play-offs first round if they are one of the other six runners-up among all nine groups (not counting results against the sixth-placed team).

== Standings ==
Pos	Team	Pld	W	D	L	GF	GA	GD	Pts	Qualification	(Germany)	(Portugal)	(Serbia)	(Turkey)	(Israel)	(Bulgaria)
1	Germany	10	9	0	1	47	5	+42	27	2023 FIFA Women's World Cup	—	3–0	5–1	8–0	7–0	7–0
2	Portugal	10	7	1	2	26	9	+17	22	Play-offs	1–3	—	2–1	4–0	4–0	3–0
3	Serbia	10	7	0	3	26	14	+12	21		3–2	1–2	—	2–0	4–0	3–0
4	Turkey	10	3	1	6	9	26	−17	10		0–3	1–1	2–5	—	3–2	1–0
5	Israel	10	3	0	7	7	25	−18	9		0–1	0–4	0–2	1–0	—	2–0
6	Bulgaria	10	0	0	10	1	37	−36	0		0–8	0–5	1–4	0–2	0–2	—

Source: UEFA
Rules for classification: Tiebreakers

== Matches ==
Times are CET/CEST, (Note: CEST (UTC+2) for dates between 28 March and 31 October 2021 and between 27 March and 30 October 2022, and CET (UTC+1) for all other dates.) as listed by UEFA (local times, if different, are in parentheses).

16 September 2021
18:00 (19:00 TRT)

Turkey	1–1	Portugal
Uraz 30'	Report (FIFA); Report (UEFA)	J. Silva 58'

Bahçeşehir Okulları Stadium, Alanya
Attendance: 53
Referee: Maika Vanderstichel (France)
18 September 2021
16:07

Germany	7–0	Bulgaria
Schüller 21', 72'; Magull 24', 33'; Dallmann 67', 82'; Waßmuth 76'	Report (FIFA); Report (UEFA)

Stadion der Freundschaft, Cottbus
Attendance: 1,534
Referee: Ivana Projkovska (North Macedonia)

19 September 2021
18:00 (19:00 IST)

Israel	0–4	Portugal
	Report (FIFA); Report (UEFA)	Encarnação 2'; Do. Silva 7' (pen.); Gomes 64'; C. Costa 84'

Haberfeld Stadium, Rishon LeZion
Attendance: 1,036
Referee: Maria Marotta (Italy)
21 September 2021
16:00

Germany	5–1	Serbia
Schüller 49', 54', 71', 77'; Leupolz 79'	Report (FIFA); Report (UEFA)	Matejić 3'

Stadion an der Gellertstraße, Chemnitz
Attendance: 1,604
Referee: Kirsty Dowle (England)

21 October 2021
17:00 (18:00 TRT)

Turkey	1–0	Bulgaria
Uraz 76'	Report (FIFA); Report (UEFA)

Esenyurt Necmi Kadıoğlu Stadium, Istanbul
Attendance: 213
Referee: Jurgita Mačikunytė (Lithuania)
21 October 2021
18:00 (19:00 IST)

Israel	0–1	Germany
	Report (FIFA); Report (UEFA)	Huth 18'

HaMoshava Stadium, Petah Tikva
Attendance: 800
Referee: Tanja Subotič (Slovenia)
21 October 2021
19:00 (18:00 WEST)

Portugal	2–1	Serbia
Borges 28'; Do. Silva 52' (pen.)	Report (FIFA); Report (UEFA)	Matejić 45+2'

Estádio do Bonfim, Setúbal
Attendance: 3,821
Referee: Ewa Augustyn (Poland)

26 October 2021
16:05

Germany	7–0	Israel
Brand 20', 45'; Däbritz 26'; Freigang 43'; Magull 56'; Waßmuth 71'; Rauch 78'	Report (FIFA); Report (UEFA)

Stadion Essen, Essen
Attendance: 1,814
Referee: Elvira Nurmustafina (Kazakhstan)
26 October 2021
17:00 (18:00 EEST)

Bulgaria	0–5	Portugal
	Report (FIFA); Report (UEFA)	Ivanova 3' (o.g.); Di. Silva 5', 57'; Gomes 71'; C. Costa 76' (pen.)

Stadion Lokomotiv, Plovdiv
Attendance: 100
Referee: Alina Peşu (Romania)
26 October 2021
18:00

Serbia	2–0	Turkey
Stefanović 28'; Damjanović 54' (pen.)	Report (FIFA); Report (UEFA)

Stadion Metalac, Gornji Milanovac
Attendance: 254
Referee: Katalin Sipos (Hungary)

25 November 2021
16:00

Serbia	3–0	Bulgaria
Damnjanović 31', 59'; Damjanović 84'	Report (FIFA); Report (UEFA)

Serbian FA Sports Center, Stara Pazova
Attendance: 120
Referee: Vera Opeykina (Russia)
25 November 2021
19:00 (18:00 WET)

Portugal	4–0	Israel
Mendes 27', 43', 54'; Gomes 49'	Report (FIFA); Report (UEFA)

Estádio Municipal de Portimão, Portimão
Attendance: 350
Referee: Jelena Pejković (Croatia)
26 November 2021
16:00

Germany	8–0	Turkey
Tağ 1' (o.g.); Schüller 10', 11', 67'; Brand 61'; Freigang 74'; Nüsken 80'; Bühl 87'	Report (FIFA); Report (UEFA)

Eintracht-Stadion, Braunschweig
Attendance: 2,583
Referee: Aleksandra Česen (Slovenia)

30 November 2021
15:00 (16:00 EET)

Bulgaria	1–4	Serbia
Naydenova 49'	Report (FIFA); Report (UEFA)	Mijatović 20'; Milivojević 33'; Damnjanović 45', 89'

Stadion Lokomotiv, Plovdiv
Attendance: 54
Referee: Ainara Acevedo (Spain)
30 November 2021
16:00 (18:00 TRT)

Turkey	3–2	Israel
Sadıkoğlu 71'; Taşkın 90+3'; Topçu 90+7' (pen.)	Report (FIFA); Report (UEFA)	Hazan 9'; Sofer 24'

Mersin Stadium, Mersin
Attendance: 1,500
Referee: Justina Lavrenovaitė-Perez (Lithuania)
30 November 2021
19:00 (18:00 WET)

Portugal	1–3	Germany
Frohms 34' (o.g.)	Report (FIFA); Report (UEFA)	Schüller 15'; Huth 23'; Leupolz 28'

Estádio de São Luís, Faro
Attendance: 527
Referee: Rebecca Welch (England)

23 February 2022
15:00 (17:00 TRT)

Turkey	2–5	Serbia
Uraz 42'; Topçu 57' (pen.)	Report (FIFA); Report (UEFA)	Filipović 8', 72'; Damnjanović 12'; Damjanović 37'; Čanković 65'

Gürsel Aksel Stadium, İzmir
Attendance: 3,000
Referee: Deborah Anex (Switzerland)

7 April 2022
15:00 (16:00 EEST)

Bulgaria	0–2	Turkey
	Report (FIFA); Report (UEFA)	Türkoğlu 41'; Topçu 88'

Stadion Lokomotiv, Plovdiv
Attendance: 304
Referee: Tanja Račić (Bosnia and Herzegovina)
7 April 2022
18:00

Serbia	4–0	Israel
Damnjanović 5'; Filipović 67'; Ivanović 72'; Krstić 90+2'	Report (FIFA); Report (UEFA)

Serbian FA Sports Center, Stara Pazova
Attendance: 120
Referee: Ana Maria Alexandra Terteleac (Romania)
9 April 2022
16:10

Germany	3–0	Portugal
Oberdorf 40'; Bühl 55'; Rauch 80'	Report (FIFA); Report (UEFA)

Bielefelder Alm, Bielefeld
Attendance: 7,364
Referee: Lina Lehtovaara (Finland)

12 April 2022
16:00

Serbia	3–2	Germany
Poljak 36'; Damnjanović 49', 69'	Report (FIFA); Report (UEFA)	Schüller 60'; Waßmuth 90+2'

Serbian FA Sports Center, Stara Pazova
Attendance: 347
Referee: Tess Olofsson (Sweden)
12 April 2022
18:00 (19:00 IST)

Israel	1–0	Turkey
Elinav 40'	Report (FIFA); Report (UEFA)

HaMoshava Stadium, Petah Tikva
Referee: Ewa Augustyn (Poland)
12 April 2022
20:00 (19:00 WEST)

Portugal	3–0	Bulgaria
Di. Silva 18'; Marques 26'; C. Costa 42'	Report (FIFA); Report (UEFA)

Estádio Cidade de Barcelos, Barcelos
Referee: Ivana Martinčić (Croatia)

23 June 2022
18:00 (19:00 EEST)

Bulgaria	0–2	Israel
	Report (FIFA); Report (UEFA)	Selimhodzic 29'; Avital 32'

Stadion Lokomotiv, Plovdiv
Attendance: 360
Referee: Martina Molinaro (Italy)

1 September 2022
18:30 (19:30 IST)

Israel	2–0	Bulgaria
Avital 54'; Sharabi 73'	Report (FIFA); Report (UEFA)

Ness Ziona Stadium, Ness Ziona
Attendance: 1,021
Referee: Araksya Saribekyan (Armenia)
2 September 2022
20:00

Serbia	1–2	Portugal
Frajtović 6'	Report (FIFA); Report (UEFA)	Marchão 40'; Nazareth 45+2'

Serbian FA Sports Center, Stara Pazova
Attendance: 1,700
Referee: Lina Lehtovaara (Finland)
3 September 2022
14:45 (15:45 TRT)

Turkey	0–3	Germany
	Report (FIFA); Report (UEFA)	Rauch 57' (pen.); Bühl 59'; Schüller 77'

Timsah Park, Bursa
Attendance: 2,000
Referee: Maria Marotta (Italy)

6 September 2022
18:30 (19:30 EEST)

Bulgaria	0–8	Germany
	Report (FIFA); Report (UEFA)	Schüller 35', 45+1', 52'; Freigang 45', 64', 87'; Lohmann 54'; Huth 81' (pen.)

Stadion Lokomotiv, Plovdiv
Attendance: 250
Referee: Elvira Nurmustafina (Kazakhstan)
6 September 2022
18:30 (19:30 IST)

Israel	0–2	Serbia
	Report (FIFA); Report (UEFA)	Rubin 34' (o.g.); Matejić 90+4'

Ness Ziona Stadium, Ness Ziona
Attendance: 1,013
Referee: Frida Nielsen (Denmark)
6 September 2022
18:30 (17:30 WEST)

Portugal	4–0	Turkey
Encarnação 33'; Nazareth 36'; Tağ 49' (o.g.); Faria 79'	Report (FIFA); Report (UEFA)

Estádio do FC Vizela, Vizela
Attendance: 2,471
Referee: Jana Adámková (Czech Republic)

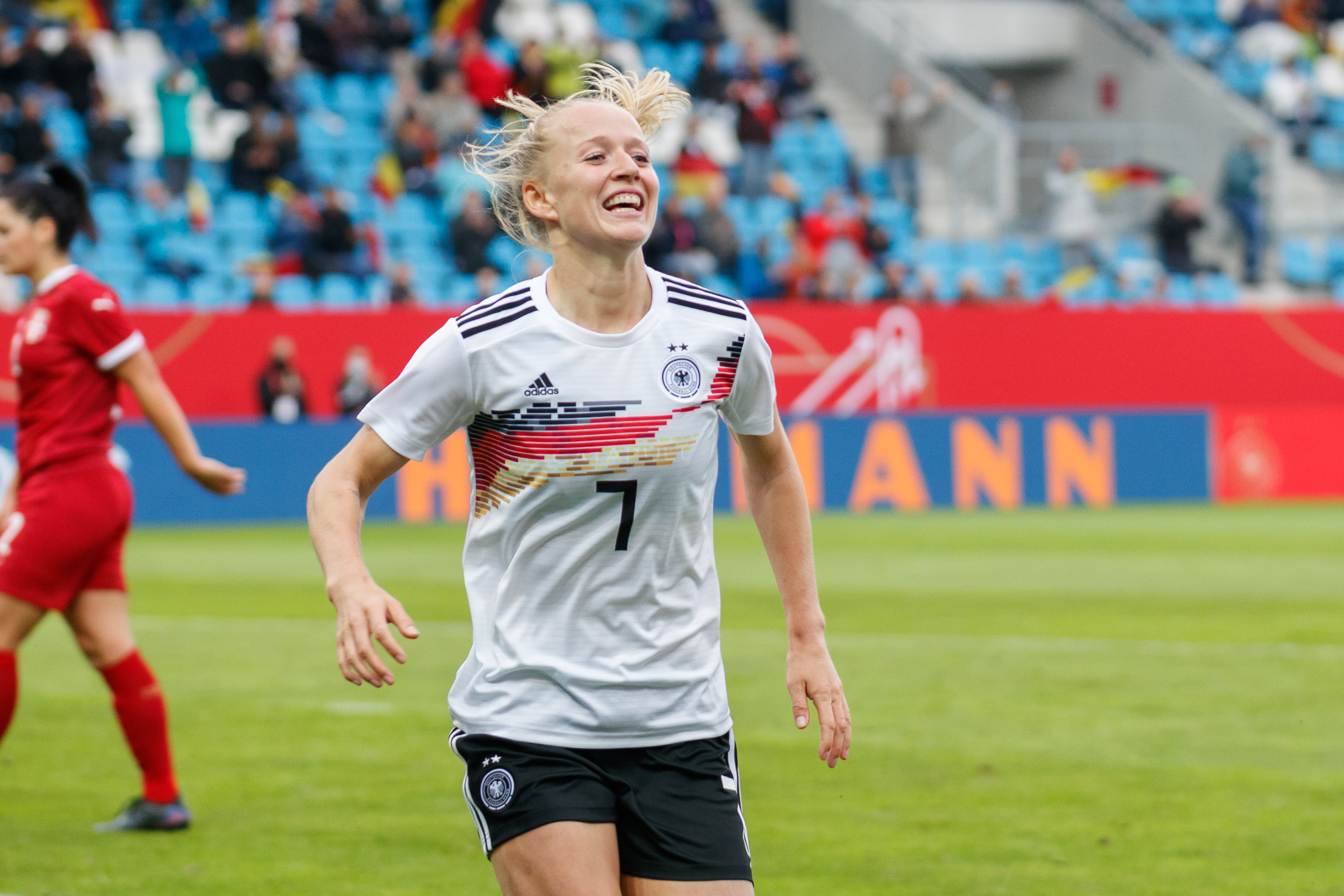
Lea Schüller, against Serbia 2021.

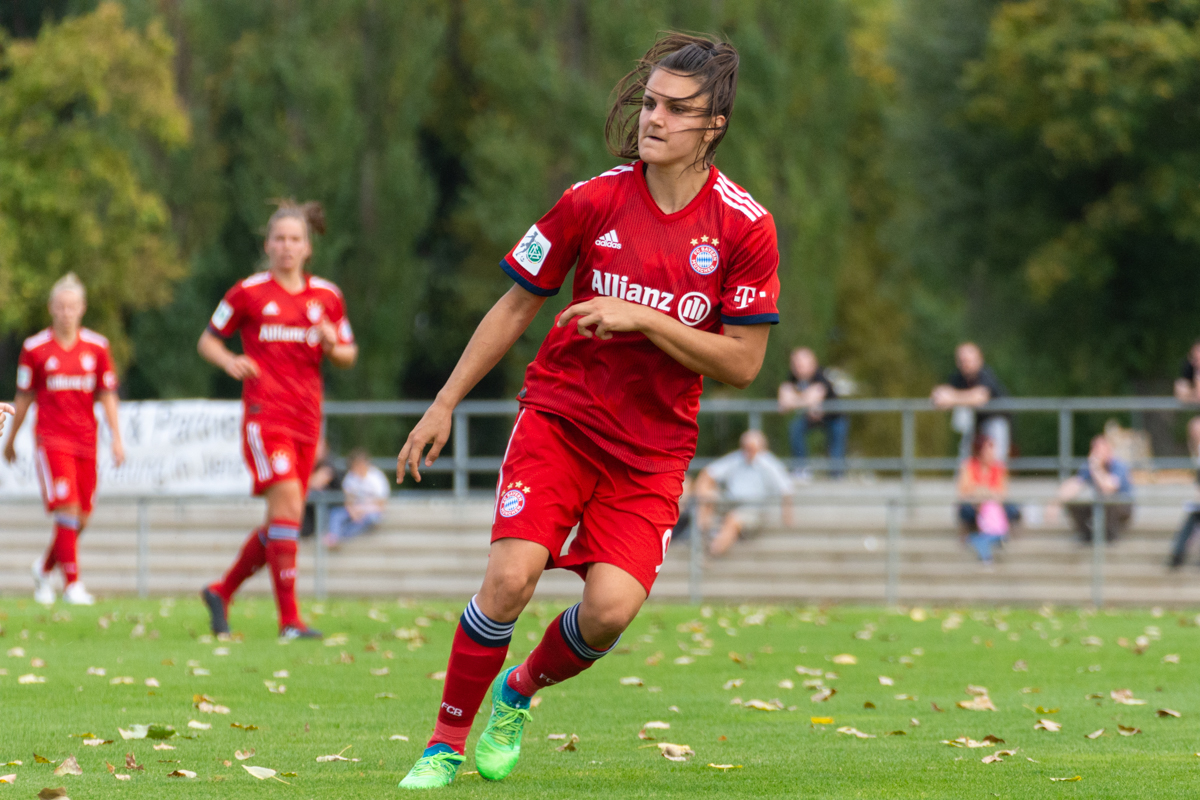
Jovana Damnjanović 2018.

== Goalscorers ==
There were 116 goals scored in 30 matches, for an average of 3.87 goals per match.

15 goals

- (Germany) Lea Schüller

8 goals

- (Serbia) Jovana Damnjanović

5 goals

- (Germany) Laura Freigang

3 goals

- (Germany) Jule Brand
- (Germany) Klara Bühl
- (Germany) Svenja Huth
- (Germany) Lina Magull
- (Germany) Felicitas Rauch
- (Germany) Tabea Waßmuth
- (Portugal) Carole Costa
- (Portugal) Diana Gomes
- (Portugal) Carolina Mendes
- (Portugal) Diana Silva
- (Serbia) Nevena Damjanović
- (Serbia) Tijana Filipović
- (Serbia) Nina Matejić
- (Turkey) Ebru Topçu
- (Turkey) Yağmur Uraz

2 goals

- (Germany) Linda Dallmann
- (Germany) Melanie Leupolz
- (Israel) Eden Avital
- (Portugal) Telma Encarnação
- (Portugal) Kika Nazareth
- (Portugal) Dolores Silva

1 goal

- (Bulgaria) Ivana Naydenova
- (Germany) Sara Däbritz
- (Germany) Sydney Lohmann
- (Germany) Sjoeke Nüsken
- (Germany) Lena Oberdorf
- (Israel) Shira Elinav
- (Israel) Koral Hazan
- (Israel) Noa Selimhodzic
- (Israel) Meytal Sharabi
- (Israel) Opal Sofer
- (Portugal) Ana Borges
- (Portugal) Andreia Faria
- (Portugal) Joana Marchão
- (Portugal) Vanessa Marques
- (Portugal) Jéssica Silva
- (Serbia) Jelena Čanković
- (Serbia) Anđela Frajtović
- (Serbia) Miljana Ivanović
- (Serbia) Anđela Krstić
- (Serbia) Milica Mijatović
- (Serbia) Vesna Milivojević
- (Serbia) Allegra Poljak
- (Serbia) Dejana Stefanović
- (Turkey) Birgül Sadıkoğlu
- (Turkey) Dilan Yeşim Taşkin
- (Turkey) Ece Türkoğlu

1 own goal

- (Bulgaria) Yanitsa Ivanova (against Portugal)
- (Germany) Merle Frohms (against Portugal)
- (Israel) Fortuna Rubin (against Serbia)

2 own goals

- (Turkey) Kezban Tağ (against Germany and Portugal)
