= Opal Sofer =

Israeli footballer (born 1997)

Opal Sofer אופל סופר
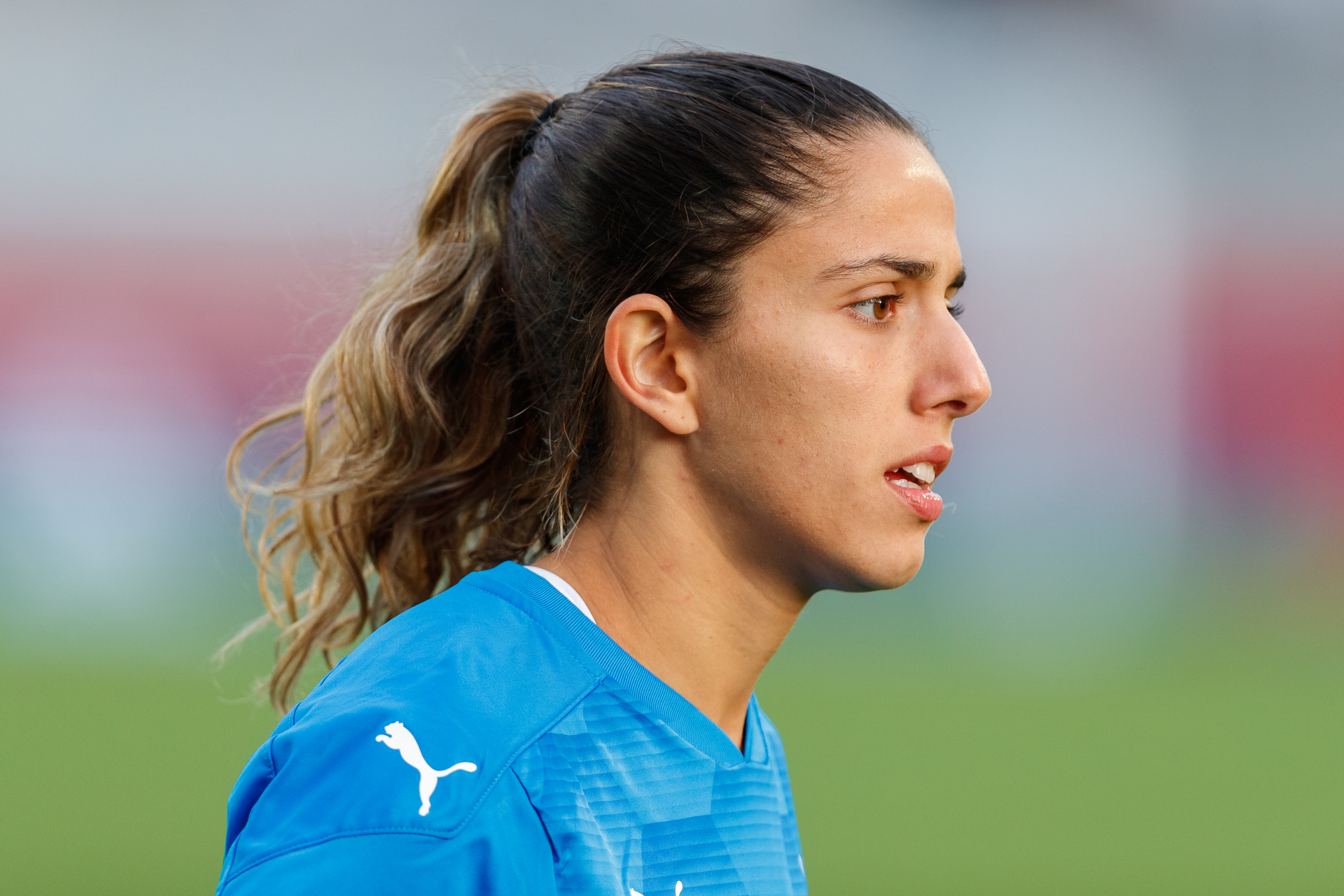
- Sofer playing for Israel in 2021

Personal information
- Date of birth: 20 May 1997 (age 29)
- Place of birth: Even Yehuda, Israel
- Position: Midfielder

Team information
- Current team: Hapoel Katamon Jerusalem

Youth career
- 2010–2011: Hapoel Ra'anana
- 2011–2012: Hapoel Petah Tikva
- 2012–2014: Girls Football Academy
- 2015–2016: Hapoel Petah Tikva

Senior career*
Years	Team	Apps	(Gls)
2012–2015	Girls Football Academy	43	(0)
2017–2018	Hapoel Petah Tikva	45	(1)
2017–2018	Ramat HaSharon	22	(0)
2018–2022	ASA Tel Aviv	73	(4)
2022–2024	Kiryat Gat	44	(1)
2024–	Hapoel Katamon Jerusalem	0	(0)

International career^{‡}
2012–2013	Israel U17	9	(0)
2014–2015	Israel U19	13	(1)
2020–	Israel	16	(1)
- * Club domestic league appearances and goals as of 23 June 2024 ‡ National team caps and goals as of 1 June 2024

Opal Sofer (Hebrew: אופל סופר; born 20 May 1997) is an Israeli professional footballer who plays as a midfielder for Hapoel Katamon Jerusalem and the Israel women's national team.

== Club career ==
=== Hapoel Katamon ===
In June 2024, Sofer joined Hapoel Katamon Jerusalem.

== International career ==
Sofer has been capped for the Israel national team, appearing for the team during the 2019 FIFA Women's World Cup qualifying cycle.

== International goals ==
No.	Date	Venue	Opponent	Score	Result	Competition
1.	30 November 2021	Mersin Arena, Mersin, Turkey	Turkey	2–0	2–3	2023 FIFA Women's World Cup qualification
