= Tabea Sellner =

German footballer

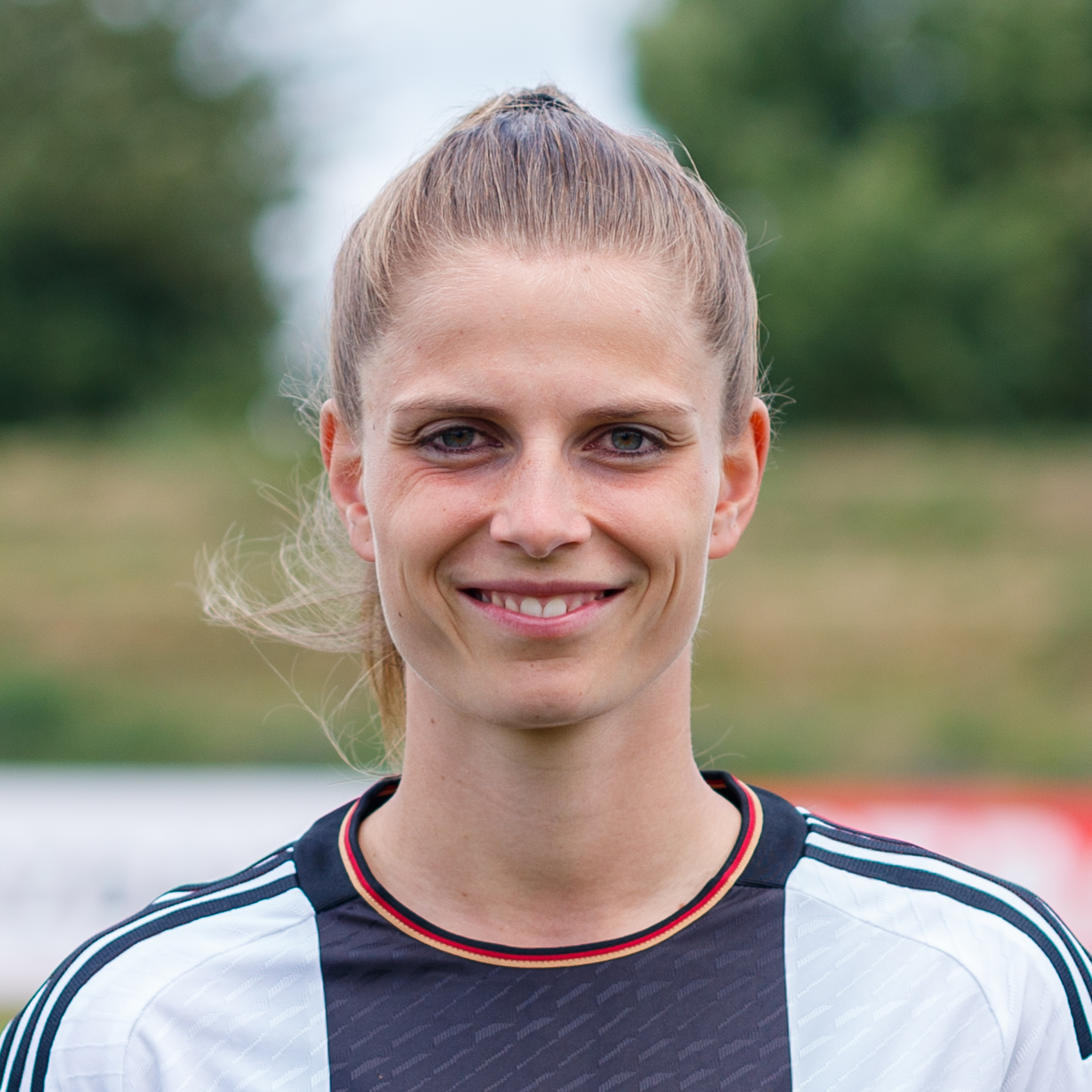
- Sellner in the national team shirt (2023)

Personal information
- Date of birth: 25 August 1996 (age 30)
- Place of birth: Giessen, Germany
- Height: 1.70 m (5 ft 7 in)
- Position: Forward

Youth career
- –2009: Karlsruher FV
- 2009–2014: 1899 Hoffenheim

Senior career*
Years	Team	Apps	(Gls)
2014–2017	1899 Hoffenheim II	44	(9)
2015–2021	1899 Hoffenheim	96	(28)
2021–2025	VfL Wolfsburg	42	(19)
Total		182	(56)

International career^{‡}
2020–	Germany	25	(5)
Medal record
UEFA Women's Championship
Silver medal – second place	2022 England
- * Club domestic league appearances and goals as of 03:56, 20 September 2025 (UTC) ‡ National team caps and goals as of 17:52, 25 June 2023 (UTC)

Tabea Sellner (née Waßmuth; born 25 August 1996) is a German former professional footballer who played as a forward.

== Club career ==
Sellner began her career with TSG 1899 Hoffenheim and won the German B-Junior Championship there in 2012. For the second half of the 2012/13 season, she was promoted to the second Hoffenheim team and achieved promotion to the 2nd Bundesliga for the first time in the summer of 2014. She made her debut in the Bundesliga in February 2015. With Hoffenheim, she appeared in 96 Bundesliga matches, scoring 28 goals.

Sellner signed to join VfL Wolfsburg in July 2021. In her first season, she finished the group stage at the top of the scoring charts with 8 goals. In May 2022, she extended her contract with Wolfsburg through June 2025. Sellner missed part of the 2023/24 season on maternity leave. She played one more campaign for Wolfsburg before retiring from professional football in the summer of 2025.

== Personal life ==
Sellner became the ambassador for the petition "End discrimination against breastfeeding mothers" campaigned by the Health FemTec company Elvie.

== International career ==
Sellner made her international debut for Germany on 22 September 2020, starting in the away match against Montenegro in the UEFA Euro 2022 qualifying, which finished as a 3–0 win. On 1 December 2020 in Dublin, she scored her first two international goals for Germany, in a 3–1 win over the Republic of Ireland, scoring 2–0 in the 29th minute and 3–1 in the 85th minute.

Sellner was named in the Germany squad for the UEFA Euro 2022 by national coach Martina Voss-Tecklenburg. She played in four games in the tournament.

== Career statistics ==
As of 24 June 2023

Appearances and goals by national team and year
National team	Year	Apps	Goals
Germany	2020	2	2
Germany	2021	11	2
Germany	2022	9	1
Germany	2023	3	0
Total		25	5

Scores and results list Germany's goal tally first, score column indicates score after each Sellner goal.

List of international goals scored by Tabea Sellner
No.	Date	Venue	Opponent	Score	Result	Competition
1	1 December 2020	Tallaght, Ireland	Republic of Ireland	2–0	3–1	UEFA Women's Euro 2022 qualifying
2	1 December 2020	Tallaght, Ireland	Republic of Ireland	3–1	3–1	UEFA Women's Euro 2022 qualifying
3	18 September 2021	Cottbus, Germany	Bulgaria	6–0	7–0	2023 FIFA Women's World Cup qualification
4	26 October 2021	Essen, Germany	Israel	6–0	7–0	2023 FIFA Women's World Cup qualification
5	12 April 2022	Stara Pazova, Serbia	Serbia	2–3	2–3	2023 FIFA Women's World Cup qualification

== Honours ==
Germany

- UEFA Championship runner-up: 2022

Hoffenheim

- German B-Junior Football Championship: 2012
- Promotion to the 2nd Bundesliga: 2014

Wolfsburg

- Frauen-Bundesliga: 2022
- German Cup: 2022
