= Anđela Frajtović =

Serbian footballer (born 2000)

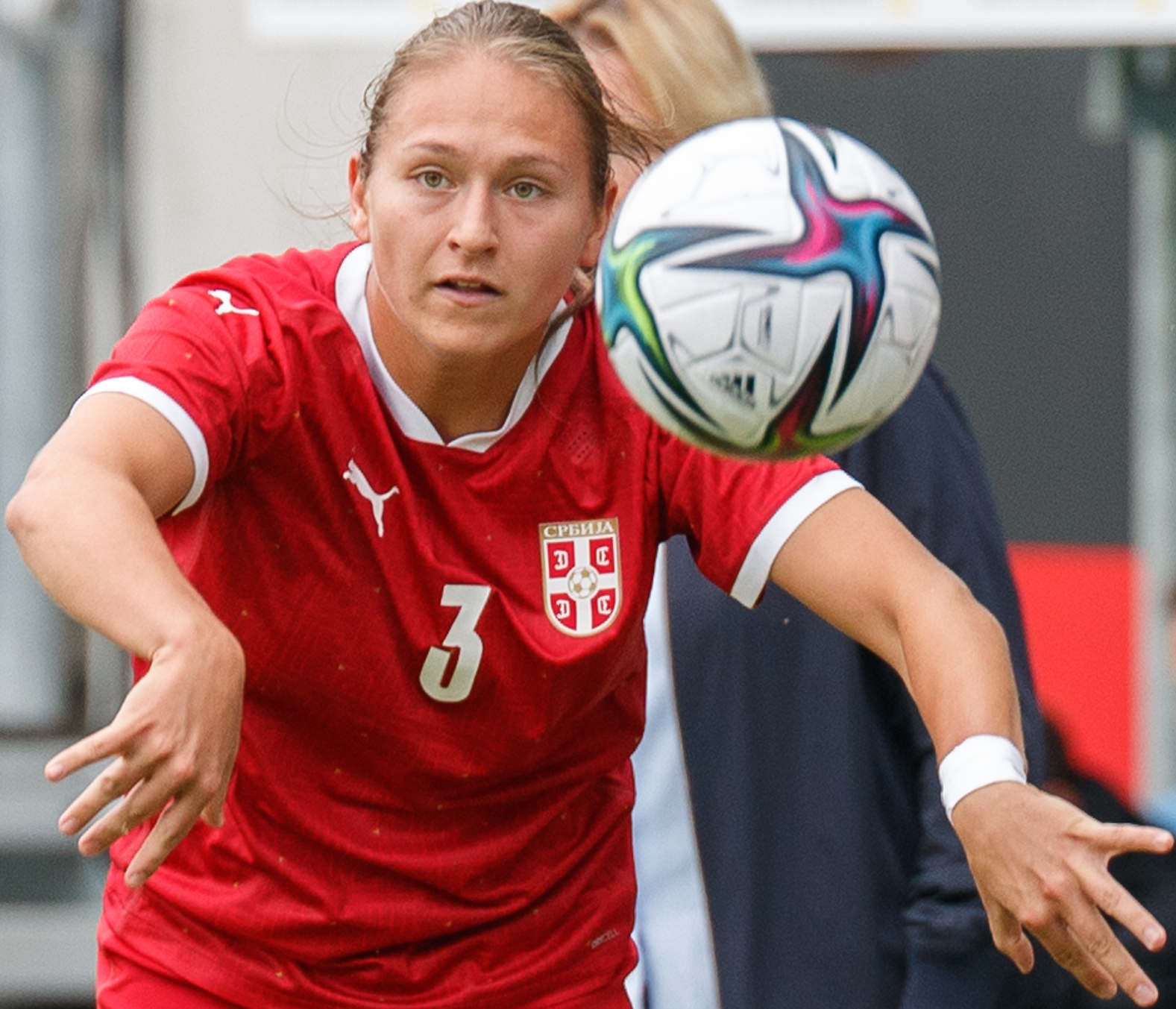
- Anđela Frajtović with Serbia in 2021

Personal information
- Date of birth: 8 July 2000 (age 26)
- Place of birth: Serbia, FR Yugoslavia
- Position: Defender

Team information
- Current team: Spartak Subotica
- Number: 6

Senior career*
Years	Team	Apps	(Gls)
- Spartak Subotica

International career^{‡}
	Serbia	18	(1)
- * Club domestic league appearances and goals as of 19:48, 30 August 2019 (UTC) ‡ National team caps and goals as of 12:26, 28 October 2023 (UTC)

Anđela Frajtović (Serbian Cyrillic: Анђела Фрајтовић; born 8 July 2000) is a Serbian footballer who plays as a defender and has appeared for the Serbia women's national team.

== Career ==
Frajtović has been capped for the Serbia national team, appearing for the team during the 2019 FIFA Women's World Cup qualifying cycle.

== International goals ==
No.	Date	Venue	Opponent	Score	Result	Competition
1.	2 September 2022	Serbian FA Sports Center, Stara Pazova, Serbia	Portugal	1–0	1–2	2023 FIFA Women's World Cup qualification
