= Diana Gomes (footballer) =

Portuguese footballer (born 1998)

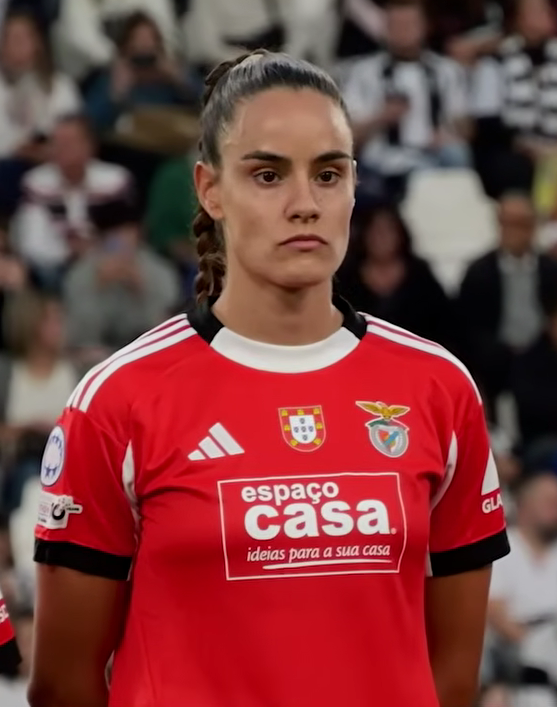
- Gomes with Benfica in 2025

Personal information
- Full name: Diana Catarina Ribeiro Gomes
- Date of birth: 26 July 1998 (age 28)
- Place of birth: Paços de Ferreira, Portugal
- Height: 1.69 m (5 ft 7 in)
- Positions: Centre-back; midfielder

Team information
- Current team: Benfica
- Number: 22

Youth career
- S.C. Freamunde

Senior career*
Years	Team	Apps	(Gls)
2012–2016	Freamunde	5	(3)
2016–2017	Valadares Gaia	12	(0)
2017–2022	Braga	93	(6)
2022–2025	Sevilla	70	(1)
2025–	Benfica	0	(0)

International career^{‡}
2013–2014	Portugal U16	5	(0)
2013–2015	Portugal U17	19	(0)
2015–2017	Portugal U19	26	(0)
2017–	Portugal	59	(7)
- * Club domestic league appearances and goals as of 12 June 2025 ‡ National team caps and goals as of 9 August 2025

Diana Catarina Ribeiro Gomes (born 26 July 1998) is a Portuguese professional footballer who plays as a centre-back and a midfielder for Benfica in the Campeonato Nacional Feminino and the Portugal women's national team.

== Career ==
=== Club ===
Gomes started playing at the local team S.C. Freamunde in Paços de Ferreira in 2012. Four years later, she moved to Campeonato Nacional de Futebol Feminino's team, Valadares Gaia F.C. In 2017, Gomes signed with S.C. Braga.

=== International ===
Starting in 2013, Gomes represented Portugal at several youth levels. With the Portugal U17 team, she played the 2014 UEFA Women's Under-17 Championship, the first time the team qualified for a UEFA Women's Under-17 Championship. Gomes also played three 2017 UEFA Women's Under-19 Championship qualifying tournaments for Portugal U19.

On 3 March 2017 Gomes debuted for Portugal senior team in a 6–0 loss for Denmark. On 19 June 2017 she was included by coach Francisco Neto in the 25-women preliminary squad intended to represent Portugal at the UEFA Women's Euro 2017, the first time the Portuguese national team qualified for a women's football major tournament. On 6 July 2017 Neto released the 23-women final roster, cutting Gomes and Cristiana Garcia from the team. However, in the last training session before the departure for the tournament, Jéssica Silva picked up an injury, and on 14 July Gomes was called up by Neto as her replacement. Gomes didn't play any match in the competition and Portugal was eliminated in the tournament first stage.

On 30 May 2023, she was included in the 23-player squad for the FIFA Women's World Cup 2023.

On 24 June 2025, Gomes was called up to the Portugal squad for the UEFA Women's Euro 2025.

== International goals ==
No.	Date	Venue	Opponent	Score	Result	Competition
1.	19 September 2021	Haberfeld Stadium, Rishon LeZion, Israel	Israel	3–0	4–0	2023 FIFA Women's World Cup qualification
2.	26 October 2021	Stadion Lokomotiv, Plovdiv, Bulgaria	Bulgaria	4–0	5–0	2023 FIFA Women's World Cup qualification
3.	25 November 2021	Estádio Municipal de Portimão, Portimão, Portugal	Israel	3–0	4–0	2023 FIFA Women's World Cup qualification
4.	9 July 2022	Leigh Sports Village, Leigh, England	Switzerland	1–2	2–2	UEFA Women's Euro 2022
5.	22 February 2023	Waikato Stadium, Hamilton, New Zealand	Cameroon	1–0	2–1	2023 FIFA Women's World Cup qualification
6.	25 October 2024	Dalga Arena, Baku, Azerbaijan	Azerbaijan	3–0	4–1	UEFA Women's Euro 2025 qualifying play-offs
7.	7 July 2025	Stade de Genève, Geneva, Switzerland	Italy	1–1	1–1	UEFA Women's Euro 2025
8.	23 October 2025	Subaru Park, Chester, United States	United States	1–1	2–1	Friendly

== Honours ==
Valadares Gaia

- Supertaça de Portugal: 2016

Braga

- Campeonato Nacional Feminino: 2018–19
- Taça de Portugal: 2019–20
- Taça da Liga: 2021–22
- Supertaça de Portugal: 2018

Benfica

- Campeonato Nacional Feminino: 2025–26
- Taça de Portugal: 2025–26
