= Dolores Silva =

Portuguese footballer (born 1991)

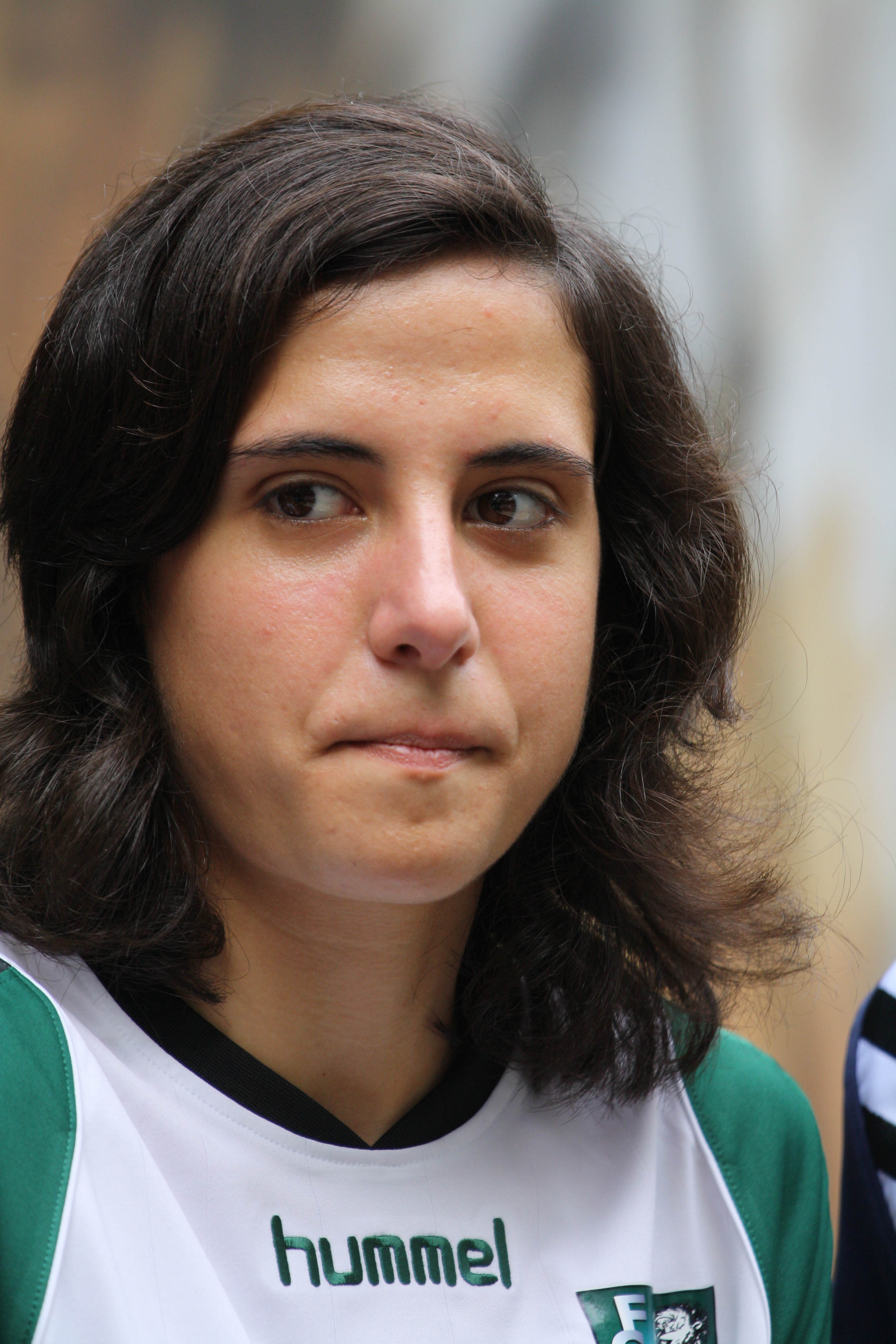
- Dolores Silva in 2011

Personal information
- Full name: Dolores Isabel Jacome Silva
- Date of birth: 7 August 1991 (age 35)
- Place of birth: Queluz, Portugal
- Height: 1.66 m (5 ft 5 1/2 in)
- Position: Midfielder

Team information
- Current team: Levante UD
- Number: 14

Youth career
- 2003–2007: Real Sport Clube
- 2007–2009: 1º Dezembro

Senior career*
Years	Team	Apps	(Gls)
2009–2011	1º Dezembro		
2011–2013	FCR 2001 Duisburg	45	(1)
2014–2015	MSV Duisburg	22	(1)
2015–2018	USV Jena	41	(0)
2018–2019	Atlético Madrid	20	(0)
2019–2025	Braga	143	(20)
2025–	Levante UD	106	(16)

International career^{‡}
2007–2009	Portugal U19	30	(1)
2009–	Portugal	171	(18)
- * Club domestic league appearances and goals as of 31 May 2026 ‡ National team caps and goals as of 16 June 2025

Dolores Isabel Jacome Silva (European Portuguese: [duˈloɾɨʃ ˈsilvɐ]; born 7 August 1991) is a Portuguese football player who plays as a midfielder for Levante UD and the Portugal women's national team.

== Club career ==
Silva joined 1º Dezembro at the age of 16 and won the League four times in succession, as well as the Cup. In summer 2011, aged 19, she signed for German club FCR 2001 Duisburg and described the move as a “dream”.

In August 2011 Silva was unfortunate to suffer an ACL injury in a friendly match against Paris Saint-Germain.

In 2014, FCR 2001 Duisburg folded and was absorbed by MSV Duisburg; Silva was one of the many players who then moved from FCR to MSV. In 2015, she signed with USV Jena.

== International career ==
In June 2011, when transferring to Duisburg, Silva had collected 19 caps for Portugal. This was in addition to 21 appearances at Under 19 level.

Silva hit two goals in Portugal's August 2010 3–0 World Cup qualifying win in Armenia.

On 30 May 2023, she was included in the 23-player squad for the FIFA Women's World Cup 2023.

On 24 June 2025, Pereira was called up to the Portugal squad for the UEFA Women's Euro 2025.

== Honours ==
S.U. 1º de Dezembro

- Portuguese National Football Championship: Winner 2008, 2009, 2010, 2011
- Portuguese Cup: Winner 2008, 2010, 2011

== International goals ==
No.	Date	Venue	Opponent	Score	Result	Competition
1.	25 August 2010	Mika Stadium, Yerevan, Armenia	Armenia	1–0	3–0	2011 FIFA Women's World Cup qualification
2.	25 August 2010	Mika Stadium, Yerevan, Armenia	Armenia	3–0	3–0	2011 FIFA Women's World Cup qualification
3.	9 March 2015	Estádio Municipal, Vila Real de Santo António, Portugal	Denmark	1–2	2–2	2015 Algarve Cup
4.	11 March 2015	Stadium Bela Vista, Parchal, Portugal	China	3–3	3–3 (8–7 p)	2015 Algarve Cup
5.	26 November 2015	Estádio António Coimbra da Mota, Estoril, Portugal	Montenegro	5–1	6–1	UEFA Women's Euro 2017 qualifying
6.	8 April 2016	Complexo Desportivo da Covilhã, Covilhã, Portugal	Spain	1–2	1–4	UEFA Women's Euro 2017 qualifying
7.	24 November 2017	Estádio do Bonfim, Setúbal, Portugal	Moldova	5–0	8–0	2019 FIFA Women's World Cup qualification
8.	6 April 2018	Den Dreef, Leuven, Belgium	Belgium	1–1	1–1	2019 FIFA Women's World Cup qualification
9.	20 January 2019	Estádio Municipal Dr. Alves Vieira, Torres Novas, Portugal	Ukraine	1–0	3–0	Friendly
10.	1 March 2019	Albufeira Municipal Stadium, Albufeira, Portugal	Sweden	1–1	2–1	2019 Algarve Cup
11.	19 September 2021	Haberfeld Stadium, Rishon LeZion, Israel	Israel	2–0	4–0	2023 FIFA Women's World Cup qualification
12.	21 October 2021	Estádio do Bonfim, Setúbal, Portugal	Serbia	2–1	2–1	2023 FIFA Women's World Cup qualification
13.	23 June 2022	Estadio do Restelo, Lisbon, Portugal	Greece	1–0	4–0	Friendly
14.	17 February 2023	Waikato Stadium, Hamilton, New Zealand	New Zealand	2–0	5–0	Friendly
15.	29 October 2024	Estádio do Futebol Clube de Vizela, Vizela, Portugal	Azerbaijan	3–0	4–0	UEFA Women's Euro 2025 qualifying play-offs
16.	5 June 2026	Estádio António Coimbra da Mota, Estoril, Portugal	Latvia	5–0	5–0	2027 FIFA Women's World Cup qualification
