= Telma Encarnação =

Portuguese footballer (born 2001)

Personal information
- Full name: Telma Raquel Velosa Encarnação
- Date of birth: 11 October 2001 (age 25)
- Place of birth: Funchal, Madeira, Portugal
- Height: 1.74 m (5 ft 9 in)
- Position: Forward

Team information
- Current team: Sporting CP
- Number: 9

Youth career
- ADRC Os Xavelhas
- Marítimo

Senior career*
Years	Team	Apps	(Gls)
2017–2024	Marítimo	78	(54)
2024–	Sporting CP	17	(7)

International career^{‡}
2017	Portugal U16	6	(4)
2017–2018	Portugal U17	13	(16)
2018–2020	Portugal U19	16	(16)
2022–	Portugal U23	2	(3)
2018–	Portugal	41	(7)
- * Club domestic league appearances and goals as of 18 June 2025 ‡ National team caps and goals as of 18 June 2025

Telma Raquel Velosa Encarnação (born 11 October 2001) is a Portuguese footballer who plays as a striker for Campeonato Nacional Feminino club Sporting CP and the Portugal women's national team.

== Club career ==
In May 2018, Encarnação scored in Marítimo's 6–0 win over Clube Condeixa which secured the club's promotion to the top-flight Campeonato Nacional Feminino for the first time. After becoming a key player she agreed a new three-year contract with Marítimo in March 2021, prolonging her stay at the Funchal club she joined as a 13-year-old from ADRC Os Xavelhas in nearby Câmara de Lobos. In August 2024, she joined the two-time Portuguese champions Sporting CP.

== International career ==
On 10 November 2018 Encarnação won her first senior cap for Portugal in a 1–0 friendly win over Wales in Rio Maior. She entered play as a 59th-minute substitute for fellow Madeiran Laura Luís.

On 30 May 2023, she was included in the 23-player squad for the FIFA Women's World Cup 2023. In that World Cup she scored Portugal's first goal in any Women's World Cup, in a match against Vietnam.

On 24 June 2025, Encarnação was called up to the Portugal squad for the UEFA Women's Euro 2025.

== International goals ==
Scores and results list Portugal's goal tally first.

No.	Date	Venue	Opponent	Score	Result	Competition
1.	14 June 2021	Shell Energy Stadium, Houston, United States	Nigeria	3–1	3–3	Friendly
2.	19 September 2021	Haberfeld Stadium, Rishon LeZion, Israel	Israel	1–0	4–0	2023 FIFA Women's World Cup qualification
3.	28 June 2022	Estádio António Coimbra da Mota, Estoril, Portugal	Australia	1–1	1–1	Friendly
4.	6 September 2022	Estádio do FC Vizela, Vizela, Portugal	Turkey	1–0	4–0	2023 FIFA Women's World Cup qualification
5.	11 April 2023	Estádio D. Afonso Henriques, Guimarães, Portugal	Wales	1–0	1–1	Friendly
6.	27 July 2023	Waikato Stadium, Hamilton, New Zealand	Vietnam	1–0	2–0	2023 FIFA Women's World Cup
7.	27 February 2024	Estádio António Coimbra da Mota, Estoril, Portugal	South Korea	2–0	5–1	Friendly
8	11 July 2025	Stade de Tourbillon, Sion, Switzerland	Belgium	1–0	1–2	UEFA Women's Euro 2025
9.	9 October 2026	Inver Park, Larne, Northern Ireland	Northern Ireland	1–0	4–0	2027 FIFA Women's World Cup qualification

== Honours ==
Marítimo

- Campeonato Nacional II Divisão Feminino: 2018

Sporting CP

- Supertaça de Portugal: 2024

Individual

- Record Campeonato Nacional Feminino Best XI: 2025–26
