= Joana Marchão =

Portuguese footballer (born 1996)

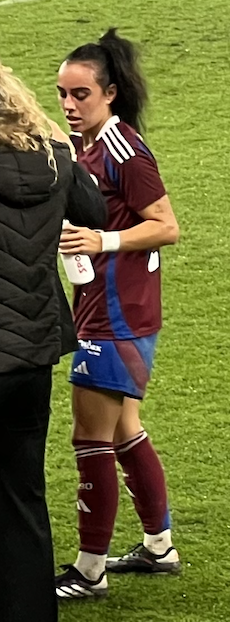
- Marchão playing in Women's Champions League in 2024.

Personal information
- Full name: Joana Filipa Gaspar Silva Marchão
- Date of birth: 24 October 1996 (age 30)
- Place of birth: Abrantes, Portugal
- Height: 1.62 m (5 ft 4 in)
- Position: Defender

Team information
- Current team: Servette FC Chênois
- Number: 24

Youth career
- 2004–2009: SA Benfica
- 2009–2011: UFCI Tomar
- 2011–2012: CA Ouriense

Senior career*
Years	Team	Apps	(Gls)
2012–2016	CA Ouriense		
2016–2022	Sporting CP	98	(22)
2022–2023	Parma	16	(0)
2023–	Servette FC Chênois	39	(6)

International career^{‡}
2012–2015	Portugal U19	26	(3)
2017–	Portugal	55	(3)
- * Club domestic league appearances and goals as of 14 June 2025 ‡ National team caps and goals as of 14 June 2025

Joana Filipa Gaspar Silva Marchão (born 24 October 1996) is a Portuguese professional footballer who plays as a defender for Swiss club Servette and the Portugal women's national team. She has previously played for CA Ouriense, Sporting CP and Parma.

== Club career ==
In July 2022, Marchão left Sporting CP after six years, signing a two-year contract with Serie A newcomers Parma.

== International career ==
Marchão has been capped for the Portugal national team, appearing for the team during the 2019 FIFA Women's World Cup qualifying cycle.

On 30 May 2023, she was included in the 23-player squad for the FIFA Women's World Cup 2023.

On 24 June 2025, Marchão was called up to the Portugal squad for the UEFA Women's Euro 2025.

== International goals ==
No.	Date	Venue	Opponent	Score	Result	Competition
1.	2 September 2022	Serbian FA Sports Center, Stara Pazova, Serbia	Serbia	1–1	2–1	2023 FIFA Women's World Cup qualification
2.	21 February 2024	Estádio António Coimbra da Mota, Estoril, Portugal	Czech Republic	3–0	3–1	Friendly
3.	27 February 2024	Estádio António Coimbra da Mota, Estoril, Portugal	South Korea	1–0	5–1	Friendly
