= Nina Matejić =

Serbian footballer (born 2005)

Нина Матејић
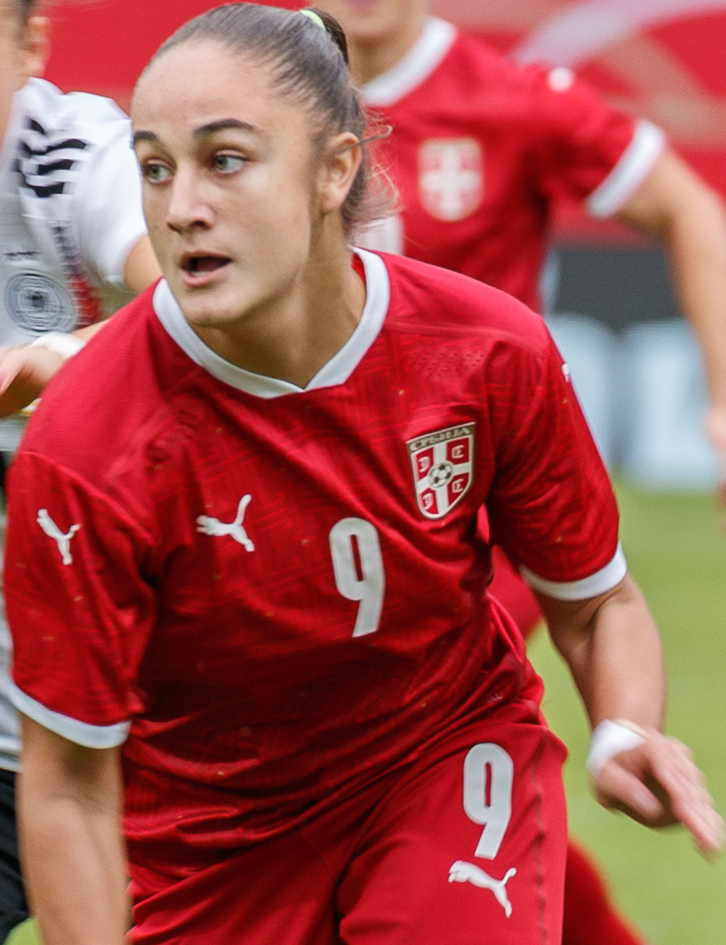
- Matejić in 2021

Personal information
- Full name: Нина Матејић
- Date of birth: 8 February 2005 (age 21)
- Place of birth: Velika Plana, Serbia and Montenegro
- Position: Forward

Team information
- Current team: Zenit
- Number: 22

Senior career*
Years	Team	Apps	(Gls)
2020–2021	ŽFK Požarevac		
2021–2022	Sloga Zemun	20	(11)
2022–2025	Red Star Belgrade	18	(16)
2025-	Zenit	7	(14)

International career^{‡}
2022	Serbia U17	6	(5)
2022–	Serbia U19	17	(23)
2021–	Serbia	21	(10)
- * Club domestic league appearances and goals as of 17:47, 3 January 2022 (UTC) ‡ National team caps and goals as of 15:05, 16 April 2025 (UTC)

Nina Matejić (Serbian Cyrillic: Нина Матејић; born 8 February 2005) is a Serbian football forward who plays for Russian Women's Football Championship club ZFK Zenit Saint Petersburg and the Serbia women's national football team.

== Club career ==
As a youth player Matejić was scouted by Bayern Munich. She performed well in a training spell with the German team, but they were not allowed to sign her until she was 18 years old. She joined ŽFK Požarevac of the Serbian Women's Super League in 2020 and was named "Player of the half-Season" in January 2021 after she scored 11 of her team's 16 league goals. In the summer of 2022 she joined ŽFK Crvena zvezda, commonly known as Red Star Belgrade.

== International career ==
Matejić was called into the senior Serbia women's national football team for the first time for the 2021 Turkish Women's Cup.

She scored after three minutes in the opening 2023 FIFA Women's World Cup qualifying match against Germany in Chemnitz on 21 September 2021, but Serbia were beaten 5–1.

In October 2021, Matejić scored again as a Serbia team depleted by injuries and COVID-19 lost their next qualifier 2–1 to Portugal at Estádio do Bonfim in Setúbal.

== International goals ==
No.	Date	Venue	Opponent	Score	Result	Competition
1.	21 September 2021	Stadion an der Gellertstraße, Chemnitz, Germany	Germany	1–0	1–5	2023 FIFA Women's World Cup qualification
2.	21 October 2021	Estádio do Bonfim, Setúbal, Portugal	Portugal	1–1	1–2	2023 FIFA Women's World Cup qualification
3.	6 September 2022	Ness Ziona Stadium, Ness Ziona, Israel	Israel	2–0	2–0	2023 FIFA Women's World Cup qualification
4.	4 June 2024	Anton Malatinský Stadium, Trnava, Slovakia	Slovakia	4–0	4–0	UEFA Women's Euro 2025 qualifying
5.	25 October 2024	Bosnia and Herzegovina FA Training Centre, Zenica, Bosnia & Herzegovina	Bosnia and Herzegovina	1–1	2–2	UEFA Women's Euro 2025 qualifying play-offs
6.	29 October 2024	Serbian FA Sports Center, Stara Pazova, Serbia	Bosnia and Herzegovina	2–1	4–1	UEFA Women's Euro 2025 qualifying play-offs
7.	29 October 2024	Serbian FA Sports Center, Stara Pazova, Serbia	Bosnia and Herzegovina	3–1	4–1	UEFA Women's Euro 2025 qualifying play-offs
8.	4 April 2025	Ménfői úti Stadion, Győr, Hungary	Hungary	1–0	1–0	2025 UEFA Women's Nations League
9.	8 April 2025	Stadio Silvio Piola, Novara, Italy	Belarus	1–0	3–0	2025 UEFA Women's Nations League
10.	8 April 2025	Stadio Silvio Piola, Novara, Italy	Belarus	3–0	3–0	2025 UEFA Women's Nations League
11.	27 October 2025	Domžale Stadium, Radomlje, Slovenia	Slovenia	4–2	4–2	Friendly
12.	2 December 2025	Mardan Sports Complex, Antalya, Turkey	Czech Republic	1–0	2–1	Friendly

== Honours ==
Individual

- UEFA Women's Under-19 Championship top scorer: 2024
- UEFA Women's Under-19 Championship Team of the Tournament: 2024
