= Yanitsa Ivanova =

Bulgarian footballer (born 2001)

Yanitsa Ivanova Яница Иванова (Bulgarian)
Personal information
- Full name: Yanitsa Emilova Ivanova
- Date of birth: 5 January 2001 (age 25)
- Position: Defender

Team information
- Current team: Lokomotiv Stara Zagora
- Number: 3

Senior career*
Years	Team	Apps	(Gls)
- NSA Sofia
- Lokomotiv Stara Zagora

International career^{‡}
2016–2017	Bulgaria U17	6	(0)
2018–2019	Bulgaria U19	8	(0)
2019–	Bulgaria	15	(0)
- * Club domestic league appearances and goals ‡ National team caps and goals as of 12:57, 10 September 2023 (UTC)

Yanitsa Emilova Ivanova (Bulgarian: Яница Емилова Иванова; born 5 January 2001) is a Bulgarian footballer who plays as a defender for Women's National Championship club Lokomotiv Stara Zagora and the Bulgaria women's national team.

== International career ==
Ivanova capped for Bulgaria at senior level in a 0–6 friendly loss to Croatia on 14 June 2019.
