= Ivana Martinčić =

Croatian association football referee

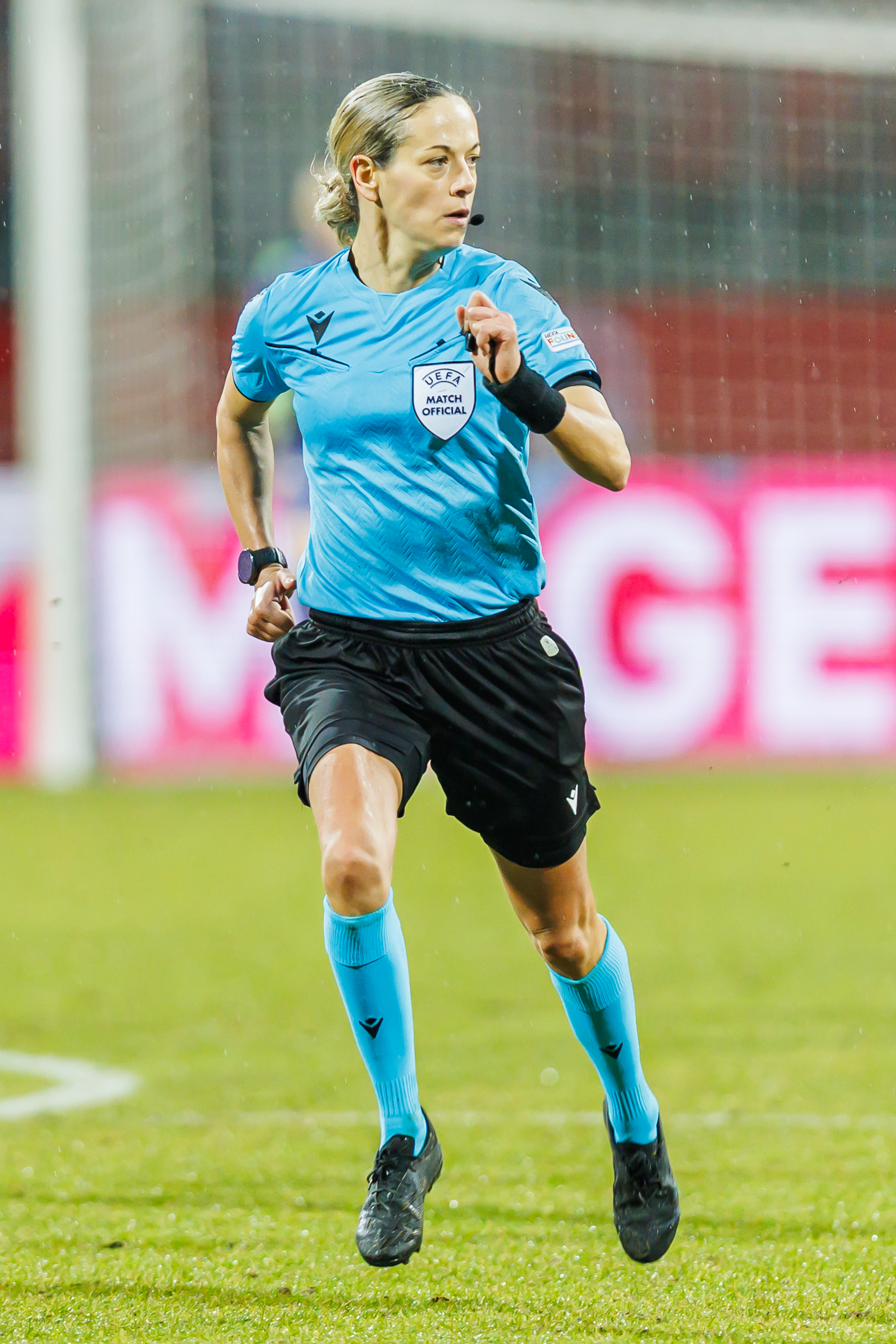
- Martinčić in 2025
- Born: 28 July 1985 (age 41); Koprivnica, SR Croatia, SFR Yugoslavia

Domestic
Years	League	Role
2020–	First Football League	Referee
2021–	Croatian Football League	Referee

International
Years	League	Role
2014-	FIFA listed	Referee

Ivana Martinčić (born 28 July 1985) is a Croatian association football referee.

== Career ==
She has been on the FIFA list since 2014 and officiates international football matches, both men's and women's.

Martinčić was a referee at the 2020 Algarve Cup. In September 2021, she became the first woman to referee a match in the Croatian Football League. On 11 November 2021, she became the first female referee to referee a match for the German men's national team, the World Cup qualifier against Liechtenstein in Wolfsburg.

She also refereed at the UEFA Women's Euro 2022 in England and the 2022 U-17 Women's World Cup in India.

In January 2023, Martinčić was nominated for the 2023 Women's World Cup in Australia and New Zealand.

The following year, she was appointed as a referee at the 2024 U-20 Women's World Cup in Colombia.

On 24 May 2025, Martinčić officiated the UEFA Women's Champions League final between Arsenal and FC Barcelona (1–0). On 31 March 2025, UEFA announced that she was selected as a match official in the Women's Euro's over the summer.
