= Kezban Tağ =

Turkish footballer (born 1993)

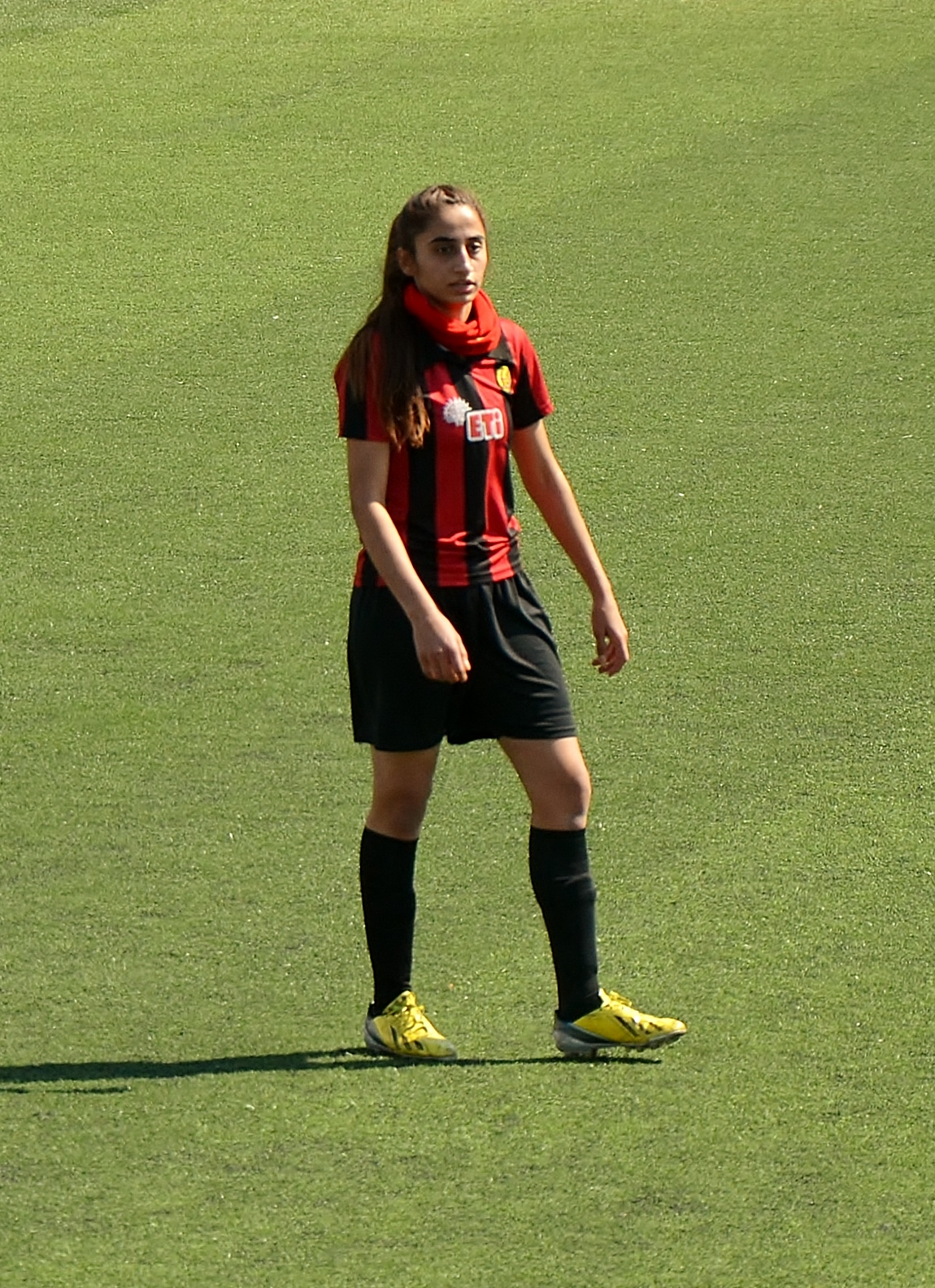
- Kezban Tağ of Eskişehirspor (March 2015)

Personal information
- Date of birth: 17 September 1993 (age 33)
- Place of birth: Küçükçekmece, Istanbul, Turkey
- Position: Defender

Senior career*
Years	Team	Apps	(Gls)
2010	Zeytinburnuspor	2	(0)
2011–2012	Bakırköy Zara	4	(1)
2014–2015	Eskişehirspor	21	(9)
2015–2016	Kireçburnu Spor	11	(0)
2017	Ataşehir Belediyespor	15	(0)
2018	Beşiktaş J.K.	9	(1)
2018–2019	Kdz. Ereğli Belediye Spor	15	(1)
2019–2024	ALG Spor	62	(7)
2024–2025	Beşiktaş J.K.	35	(1)
2025–2026	Galatasaray	23	(0)

International career^{‡}
2019–	Turkey	21	(0)
- * Club domestic league appearances and goals as of 18 March 2023 ‡ National team caps and goals as of 25 February 2025

Kezban Tağ (17 September 1993) is a Turkish women's football defender currently playing in the Turkish First League for Galatasaray with jersey number 75. She is a member of the Turkey women's national team.

== Club career ==
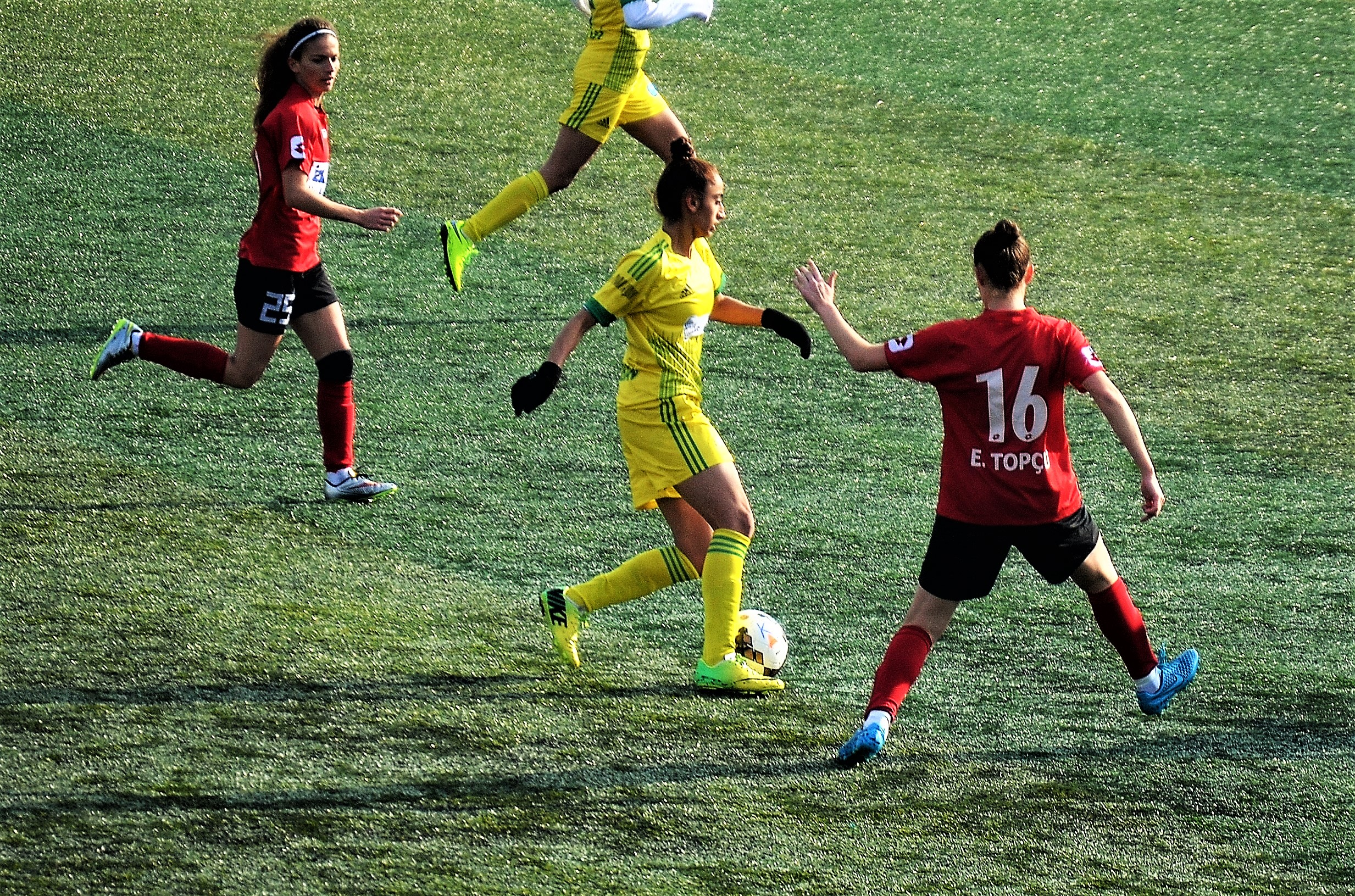
Kezban Tağ (yellow) of Kireçburnu Spor in the 2015-16 Women's First League match against Konak Belediyespor.

Kezban Tağ obtained her license from Zeytinburnuspor on 16 October 2010. She played in two matches for Zeytinburnuspor in the second half of the Women's Second League's 2009–10 season. The next season, she was with the high school team Altınşehir Lisesi Spor. In the 2011-12 Second League season, she played four games for Bakırköy Zara. In the beginning of 2014, she moved to Eskişehir to join Eskişehirspor. She enjoyed her team's promotion to the Women's First League at the end of the season. After playing the 2014-15 First League season for Eskişehirspor, she returned to her hometown Istanbul and signed with the newly promoted club Kireçburnu Spor. She played the first halves of the 2015-16 and 2016-17 seasons for Kireçburnu Spor.

=== Ataşehir Belediyespor ===
In the second half of the 2016–17 season then, she transferred to Ataşehir Belediyespor.

=== Beşiktaş J.K. ===
In the 2017-18, Tağ played for Beşiktaş J.K.

=== Kdz. Ereğli Belediye Spor ===
After one season, she moved to the Black Sea town Karadeniz Ereğli to appear for Kdz. Ereğli Belediye Spor.

=== ALG Spor ===
In the 2019-20 Women's First League season, she transferred to the Gaziantep-based club ALG Spor. She enjoyed the 2021-22 Women's Super League champion title of her team. On 18 August 2022, she debuted in the 2022–23 UEFA Women's Champions League.

=== Galatasaray ===
On August 1, 2025, she signed a contract with the Turkish giant Galatasaray.

== International career ==
Tağ was admitted to the Turkey women's national team for the first time in January 2019, remained, however, on the bench in two friendly games against Slovakia. She debuted in the friendly match against Moldova on 14 June 2019. She took part at the UEFA Women's Euro 2021 qualifying Group A.

== Career statistics ==
As of 11 April 2023.

Club	Season	League			Continental		National		Total	
Club	Season	Division	Apps	Goals	Apps	Goals	Apps	Goals	Apps	Goals
Zeytinburnuspor	2009-10	Second League	2	0	–	–	-	-	2	0
Zeytinburnuspor	Total		2	0	–	–	-	-	2	0
Bakırköy Zara	2011-12	Second League	4	1	–	–	-	-	4	1
Bakırköy Zara	Total		4	1	–	–	-	-	4	1
Eskişehirspor	2013-14	Second League	7	6	–	–	-	-	7	6
Eskişehirspor	2014-15	First League	14	3	–	–	-	-	14	3
Eskişehirspor	Total		21	9	–	–	-	-	21	9
Kireçburnu Spor	2015-16	First League	5	0	–	–	-	-	5	0
Kireçburnu Spor	2016-17	First League	6	0	–	–	-	-	6	0
Kireçburnu Spor	Total		11	0	–	–	-	-	11	0
Ataşehir Belediyespor	2016-17	First League	15	0	–	–	-	-	15	0
Ataşehir Belediyespor	Total		15	0	–	–	-	-	15	0
Beşiktaş J.K.	2017-18	First League	9	1	–	–	-	-	9	1
Beşiktaş J.K.	Total		9	1	–	–	-	-	9	1
Kdz. Ereğli Belediye Spor	2018-19	First League	15	1	–	–	1	0	16	1
Kdz. Ereğli Belediye Spor	Total		15	1	–	–	1	0	16	1
ALG Spor	2019-20	First League	15	1	–	–	1	0	16	1
ALG Spor	2020–21	First League	6	0	-	-	1	0	7	0
ALG Spor	2021–22	Super League	23	2	–	–	10	1	33	3
ALG Spor	2022–23	Super League	14	4	1	0	6	0	21	4
ALG Spor	Total		58	7	1	0	18	1	77	8
Career total			135	19	1	0	19	1	155	20

== Honours ==
Turkish Women's First Football League

Ataşehir Belediyespor
Third places (1): 2016–17

Beşiktaş J.K.
Runners-up (1): 2017–18

ALG Spor
Winners (2): 2019–20, 2021-22
Third places (1): 2020–21

Turkish Women's Second Football League

Eskişehirspor
Winners (1): 2013–14
