= FC Prishtina in European football =

FC Prishtina debuted in European football in their match against Swedish Side Norrköping. On 5 July 2018, Prishtina beat the Gibraltarian side Europa at Adem Jashari Olympic Stadium in Mitrovica and became the first Kosovan side to win a UEFA Europa League match. Their most successful campaign was when they reached the first round of the UEFA Champions League qualifying rounds in the 2020–21 season.

== Matches ==
Season	Competition	Round	Opponent	Home	Away	Agg.
2017–18	UEFA Europa League	1Q	(Sweden) Norrköping	0–1	0–5	0–6
2018–19	UEFA Europa League	PR	(Gibraltar) Europa	5–0	1–1	6–1
2018–19	UEFA Europa League	1Q	(Luxembourg) Fola Esch	0–0	0–0	0–0 (4–5 p)
2019–20	UEFA Europa League	PR	(Gibraltar) St Joseph's	1–1	0–2	1–3
2020–21	UEFA Europa League	PR	(Gibraltar) Lincoln Red Imps	0–3 (awarded)		
2021–22	UEFA Champions League	PR	(San Marino) Folgore	2–0		
2021–22	UEFA Champions League	PR	(Andorra) Inter d'Escaldes	2–0		
2021–22	UEFA Champions League	1Q	(Hungary) Ferencváros	1–3	0–3	1–6
2021–22	UEFA Europa; Conference League	2Q	(Wales) Connah's Quay Nomads	4–1	2–4	6–5
2021–22	UEFA Europa; Conference League	3Q	(Norway) Bodø/Glimt	2–1	0–2	2–3
