= PFC Ludogorets Razgrad in European football =

Bulgarian club in European football

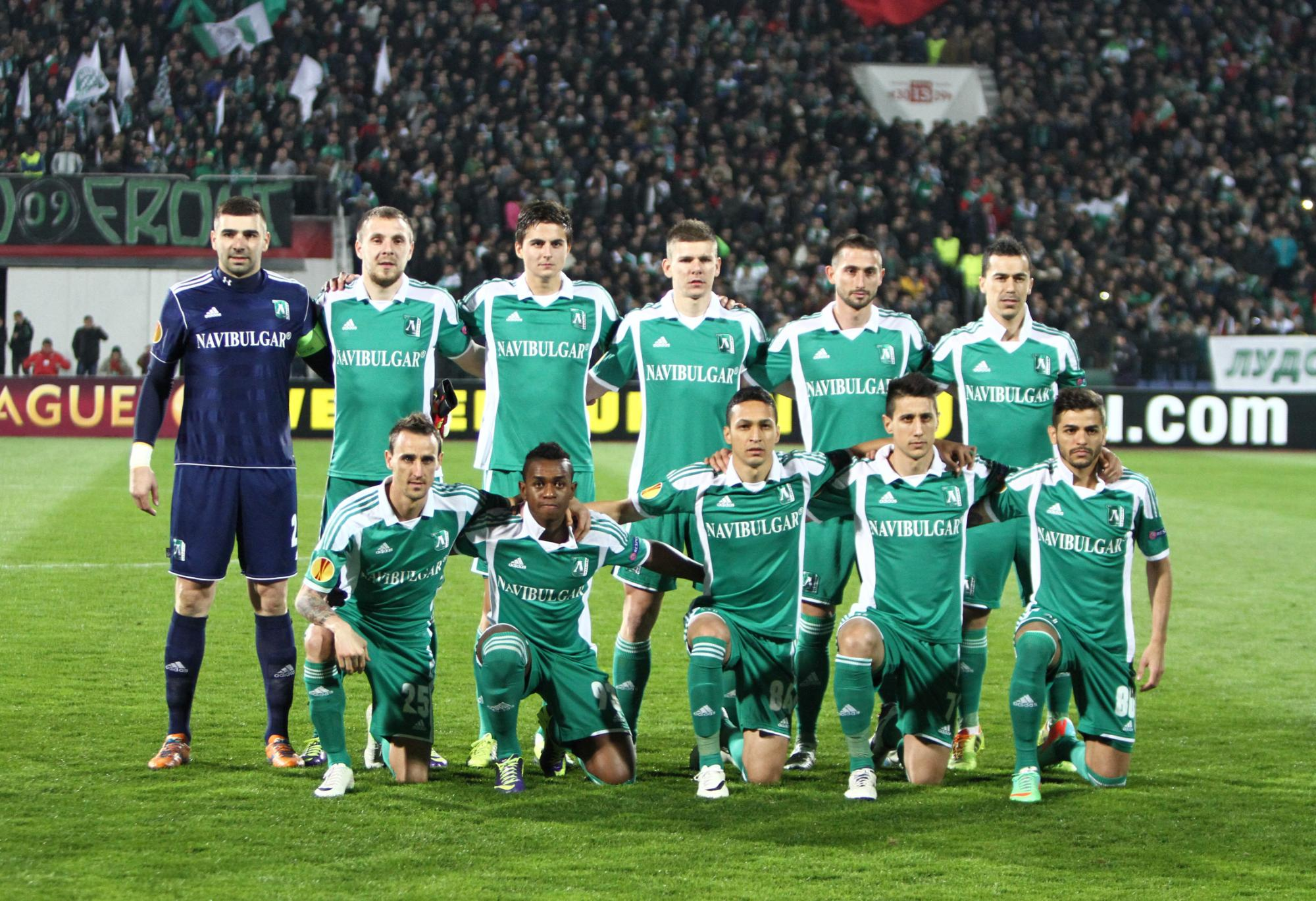
- The Ludogorets starting XI before a Round of 32 UEFA Europa League game against Lazio in Sofia on 27 February 2014
- Club: Ludogorets Razgrad
- Seasons played: 15
- First entry: 2012–13 UEFA Champions League
- Latest entry: 2026–27 UEFA Conference League

PFC Ludogorets Razgrad is an association football club from Razgrad, Bulgaria. Since their introduction to the Bulgarian top-flight, Ludogorets have participated in five different seasons of the UEFA club competitions - four in the Champions League and two in the UEFA Europa League.

Ludogorets' first entry in the European competitions was in the 2012–13 Champions League against Dinamo Zagreb of Croatia. Since then, the club competes in Europe on an annual basis with variable success.

Ludogorets' best European performance came in the 2013–14 Europa League, when the team won their group against PSV Eindhoven, Chornomorets Odesa and Dinamo Zagreb, eventually becoming the first Bulgarian team to win a UEFA Europa League group. Subsequently, they also reached the round of 16 stage of the same competition, after playing two memorable matches against Lazio, including a 1–0 away win and a 3–3 home draw, before being eliminated by Spanish club Valencia. Then, in the 2014–15 season, Ludogorets became the second Bulgarian team to reach the UEFA Champions League group stages (the first being Levski Sofia in 2006–07) after eliminating Steaua București 6–5 at penalties and the first one to score points in this phase following a 1–0 victory over FC Basel.

== History ==
After winning the 2011–12 A Group for the first time in their history, Ludogorets entered the second qualifying round of the UEFA Champions League for the 2012–13 season, where they lost 3–4 on aggregate by Croatian champions Dinamo Zagreb.

=== 2013–14 Europa League round of 16 campaign ===

Ludogorets' 2013–14 UEFA Europa League lineup against Italian cup holders Lazio, which recorded a 1-0 win at the Stadio Olimpico.

As 2012–13 Bulgarian champions, Ludogorets qualified for the 2013–14 Champions League qualifying rounds where they entered the tournament from the second preliminary round. Ludogorets were drawn against Slovan Bratislava. In the first leg in Bratislava, they recorded a 1–2 loss against the Slovak champions, keeping poor chances to advance. Despite this, Ludogorets obtained their first victory in the UEFA Champions League, after a 3–0 thrashing against Slovan at the Ludogorets Arena in the return match. As they advanced to the next round, they were drawn against Serbian champions, Partizan Belgrade. After two wins of 2–1 in Razgrad and 1–0 in the second leg, they managed to qualify for the play-off stage, obtaining indirectly their very first qualification to the group stages of a European competition. The team was drawn against FC Basel, but lost 2–4 at the Vasil Levski National Stadium in Sofia. After a second 0–2 loss in Switzerland, Ludogorets were eliminated and transferred to the Europa League for the very first time in their history.

Ludogorets were drawn in Group B of the 2013–14 Europa League, against PSV Eindhoven, Dinamo Zagreb and Chornomorets Odesa. At their debut in the competition, Ludogorets won 2–0 at Eindhoven over PSV, obtaining their first European group stages victory. On matchday 2, Ludogorets won 3–0 against Dinamo Zagreb, in a replay match from their previous Champions League season clash. On matchday 3, Ludogorets again won 1–0 against Chornomorets Odesa, becoming the first Bulgarian team to begin their group stage participation in European tournaments with three consecutive wins without conceding any goal. On matchday 4, they dropped the only points in a 1–1 home draw with Chornomorets Odesa. On matchday 5, Ludogorets win 2-1 at Zagreb against Dinamo. On the last matchday, Ludogorets again won 2–0 over PSV at Sofia and qualified for the round of 32 as group winners, with 16 points, being the only Bulgarian team undefeated in UEFA Europa League group stages. In the round of 32, Ludogorets were drawn against Italian cup holders, Lazio. In the first leg, held on Stadio Olimpico at Roma, Ludogorets won 1-0, with striker Roman Bezjak scoring the winning goal in a historic win. At Vasil Levski National Stadium, Ludogorets hold Lazio in a 3–3 draw, after Lazio had a 2–0 lead, until Bezjak and Hristo Zlatinski scored for 2–2. Later, Lazio scored for 3–2, but Juninho Quixada scored the equaliser for a 4–3 aggregate win. In the round of 16, Ludogorets hosted Spanish team Valencia, but were defeated 0–3, suffering their first defeat in the UEFA Europa League. In the second leg at Mestalla Stadium, Ludogorets were again defeated 0–1 by Valencia and eliminated.

=== 2014–15 Champions League group stages ===
In the 2014–15 Champions League, Ludogorets again won both their qualifiers, against F91 Dudelange of Luxembourg and Partizan Belgrade. In the play-off they defeated Steaua București to reach the group stage for the first time. Goalkeeper Vladislav Stoyanov was dismissed for a second yellow card in the last minute of extra time in the second leg, when Ludogorets had used all their substitutes. In the penalty shoot-out, centre-back Cosmin Moți, having converted the first penalty, went in goal and made two saves to put Ludogorets through 6–5 on penalties.

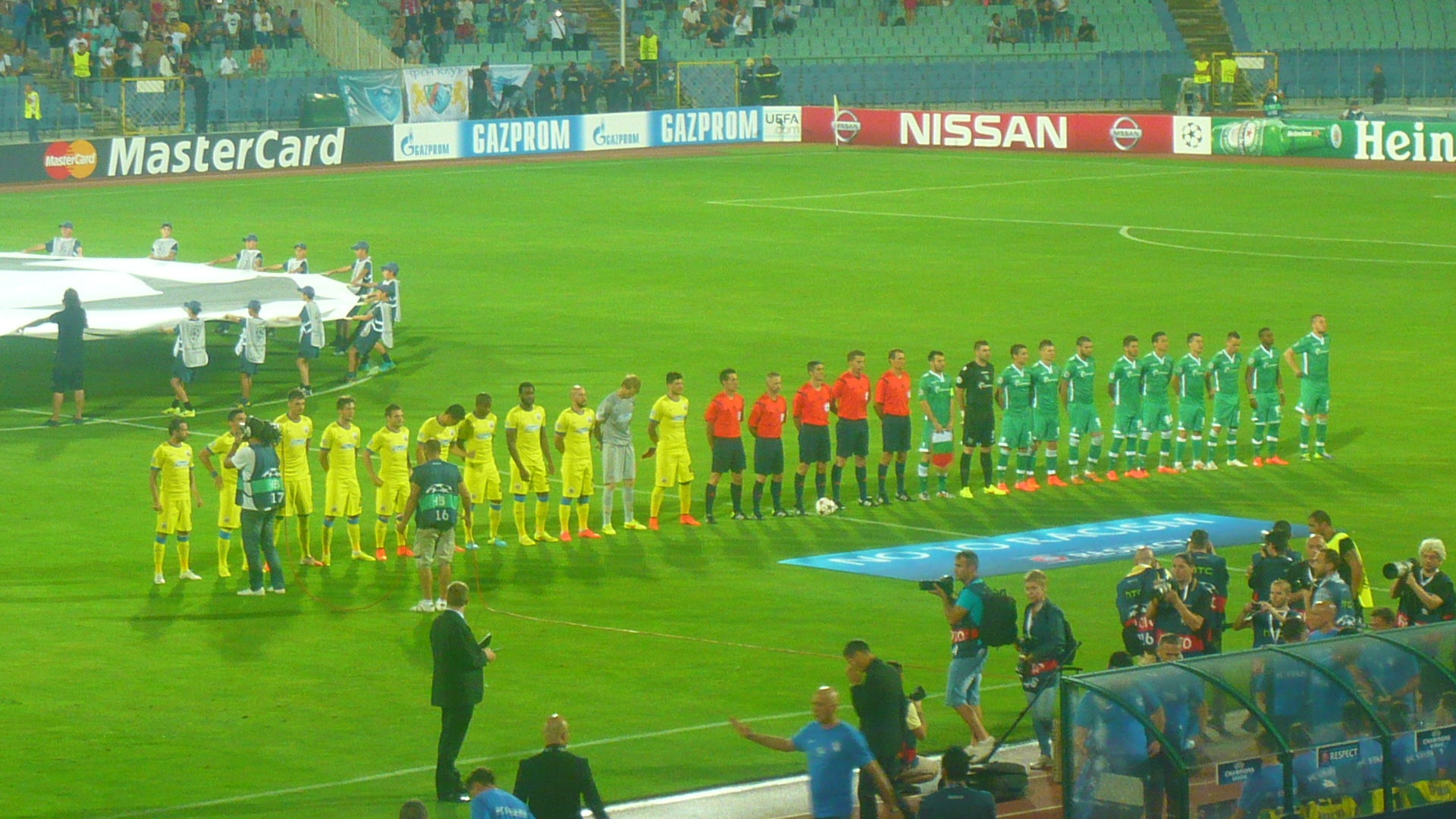
Ludogorets and Steaua's starting line-ups during their play-off match of the UEFA Champions League.

Ludogorets made their debut in the 2014–15 Champions League group phase on 16 September 2014, grabbing a 1-1 equalizer away against Liverpool in the 90th minute scored by Dani Abalo, but in an eventual 1-2 loss, as the newly signed goalkeeper Milan Borjan then gave away a penalty with a foul on Javi Manquillo, which Steven Gerrard converted to give Liverpool the victory. Ludogorets made their home debut in the 2014–15 Champions League group phase on 1 October 2014, scoring a goal in the 6th minute through Ludogorets' attacking midfielder Marcelinho against the current Champions League champion Real Madrid, but in an eventual 1–2 loss. In this game Cristiano Ronaldo took two penalties, with the first saved by the Ludogorets' goalkeeper Vladislav Stoyanov and the second converted into the goal for a 1-1 equalizer. On 22 October 2014, Yordan Minev scored his first goal for Ludogorets, scoring a last-minute winning goal in a 1–0 home win over Basel in the group stage of the Champions League. However, on matchday 4, Ludogorets were defeated 0-4 by Basel at St. Jakob-Park, suffering their worst defeat in the European competitions. On 26 November 2014, Dani Abalo scored in the 3rd minute and Georgi Terziev scored his first goal in the 88th minute, getting a 2–2 equalizer against Liverpool, in an eventual 2-2 draw. On the last matchday, Ludogorets were beaten 0-4 at Santiago Bernabéu by Real Madrid, ending their UEFA Champions League adventure on the fourth place, with 4 points, becoming the first Bulgarian team to record points in that competition when they defeated Basel. This was also the first home win for a Bulgarian team in the UEFA Champions League, and was followed by a 2-2 home draw with Liverpool.

== Total statistics ==
As of 14 August 2026

Competition	Pld	W	D	L	GF	GA	Win%
UEFA Champions League	76	28	18	30	111	106	36.84
UEFA Europa League	93	30	26	37	125	124	32.26
UEFA Europa Conference League	12	5	2	5	15	18	41.67
Total	181	63	46	72	251	248	34.81

== Statistics by club/country ==
As of 14 August 2026

Country	Club	Pld	W	D	L	GF	GA	GD
Austria	LASK	2	0	0	2	4	7	−3
Subtotal		2	0	0	2	4	7	−3
Azerbaijan	Qarabağ	2	1	0	1	4	8	−4
Subtotal		2	1	0	1	4	8	−4
Belarus	Dinamo Minsk	4	2	1	1	5	3	+2
Belarus	Dynamo Brest	1	1	0	0	2	0	+2
Belarus	Shakhtyor Soligorsk	2	2	0	0	2	0	+2
Subtotal		7	5	1	1	9	3	+6
Belgium	Anderlecht	3	1	0	2	2	4	−2
Belgium	Antwerp	2	0	0	2	2	5	−3
Subtotal		5	1	0	4	4	9	−5
Bosnia and Herzegovina	Zrinjski Mostar	2	1	1	0	2	1	+1
Subtotal		2	1	1	0	2	1	+1
Croatia	Dinamo Zagreb	6	2	1	3	11	11	±0
Croatia	Rijeka	2	1	1	0	3	1	+2
Subtotal		8	3	2	3	14	12	+2
Czech Republic	Slavia Prague	1	0	0	1	0	2	−2
Czech Republic	Viktoria Plzeň	3	1	2	0	4	2	+2
Subtotal		4	1	2	1	4	4	±0
Cyprus	AEK Larnaca	2	0	2	0	1	1	±0
Subtotal		2	0	2	0	1	1	±0
Denmark	Copenhagen	2	0	1	1	1	2	−1
Denmark	Midtjylland	4	0	2	2	1	4	−3
Denmark	Nordsjælland	2	1	0	1	2	7	−5
Subtotal		8	1	3	4	4	13	−9
England	Arsenal	2	0	0	2	2	9	−7
England	Liverpool	2	0	1	1	3	4	−1
England	Tottenham Hotspur	2	0	0	2	1	7	−6
Subtotal		6	0	1	5	6	20	−14
Finland	HJK	2	1	1	0	3	1	+2
Subtotal		2	1	1	0	3	1	+2
France	Lyon	1	0	1	0	1	1	±0
France	Nice	1	1	0	0	1	0	+1
France	Paris Saint-Germain	2	0	1	1	3	5	−2
Subtotal		4	1	2	1	5	6	−1
Germany	Bayer Leverkusen	2	0	1	1	3	4	−1
Germany	TSG Hoffenheim	2	1	1	0	3	2	+1
Subtotal		4	1	2	1	6	6	±0
(Georgia (country)) Georgia	Dinamo Batumi	2	1	0	1	3	2	+1
(Georgia (country)) Georgia	Torpedo Kutaisi	2	2	0	0	5	0	+5
Subtotal		4	3	0	1	8	2	+6
Greece	Olympiacos	2	0	2	0	3	3	±0
Greece	PAOK	1	0	1	0	3	3	±0
Subtotal		3	0	3	0	6	6	±0
Hungary	Ferencváros	9	2	2	5	10	15	−5
Hungary	Videoton	2	0	1	1	0	1	−1
Subtotal		11	2	3	6	10	16	−6
Iceland	Valur	2	1	1	0	5	1	+4
Subtotal		2	1	1	0	5	1	+4
Israel	Hapoel Be'er Sheva	2	1	0	1	3	3	±0
Israel	Hapoel Tel Aviv	2	0	1	1	2	4	−2
Subtotal		4	1	1	2	5	7	−2
Italy	Inter Milan	2	0	0	2	1	4	−3
Italy	Lazio	3	1	2	0	4	3	+1
Italy	Milan	2	0	0	2	0	4	−4
Italy	Roma	2	1	0	1	3	4	−1
Subtotal		9	2	2	5	8	15	−7
Kazakhstan	Astana	2	1	0	1	6	3	+3
Subtotal		2	1	0	1	6	3	+3
Kosovo	Ballkani	2	1	0	1	4	2	+2
Subtotal		2	1	0	1	4	2	+2
Lithuania	Sūduva Marijampolė	2	1	1	0	2	0	+2
Lithuania	Žalgiris	4	2	1	1	9	6	+3
Subtotal		6	3	2	1	11	6	+5
Luxembourg	F91 Dudelange	2	1	1	0	5	1	+4
Subtotal		2	1	1	0	5	1	+4
Moldova	Milsami Orhei	2	0	0	2	1	3	−2
Moldova	Petrocub Hîncești	2	2	0	0	6	1	+5
Subtotal		4	2	0	2	7	4	+3
Montenegro	Budućnost Podgorica	1	1	0	0	3	1	+2
Montenegro	Mladost Podgorica	2	2	0	0	5	0	+5
Montenegro	Sutjeska Nikšić	2	2	0	0	3	0	+3
Subtotal		5	5	0	0	11	1	+10
Netherlands	Ajax	2	1	0	1	2	4	−2
Netherlands	AZ	1	0	1	0	2	2	±0
Netherlands	PSV Eindhoven	2	2	0	0	4	0	+4
Subtotal		5	3	1	1	8	6	+2
North Macedonia	Shkëndija	2	1	0	1	5	3	+2
Subtotal		2	1	0	1	5	3	+2
Northern Ireland	Crusaders	2	2	0	0	9	0	+9
Subtotal		2	2	0	0	9	0	+9
Portugal	Braga	4	1	1	2	5	6	−1
Subtotal		4	1	1	2	5	6	−1
Republic of Ireland	Shamrock Rovers	2	1	0	1	4	2	+2
Subtotal		2	1	0	1	4	2	+2
Romania	Steaua București	2	1	0	1	1	1	±0
Subtotal		2	1	0	1	1	1	±0
Russia	CSKA Moscow	2	1	1	0	6	2	+4
Subtotal		2	1	1	0	6	2	+4
Scotland	Rangers	1	0	0	1	0	1	−1
Subtotal		1	0	0	1	0	1	−1
Serbia	Partizan	4	2	2	0	5	3	+2
Serbia	Red Star Belgrade	4	1	1	2	6	6	±0
Subtotal		8	3	3	2	11	9	+2
Slovakia	Slovan Bratislava	2	1	0	1	4	2	+2
Slovakia	Spartak Trnava	2	2	0	0	6	1	+5
Subtotal		4	3	0	1	10	3	+7
Slovenia	Maribor	2	0	2	0	2	2	±0
Slovenia	Mura	2	1	1	0	3	1	+2
Slovenia	Olimpija	2	0	1	1	2	3	−1
Subtotal		6	1	4	1	7	6	+1
Spain	Athletic Bilbao	1	0	0	1	1	2	–1
Spain	Celta Vigo	1	1	0	0	3	2	+1
Spain	Espanyol	2	0	0	2	0	7	−7
Spain	Real Betis	3	0	0	3	2	6	−4
Spain	Real Madrid	2	0	0	2	1	6	−5
Spain	Valencia	2	0	0	2	0	4	–4
Subtotal		11	1	0	10	7	27	–20
Sweden	Malmö FF	3	2	0	1	4	4	±0
Subtotal		3	2	0	1	4	4	±0
Switzerland	Basel	6	1	2	3	4	11	–7
Switzerland	Servette	2	0	1	1	0	1	−1
Switzerland	Young Boys	1	0	0	1	2	3	−1
Switzerland	Zürich	2	0	1	1	1	2	−1
Subtotal		11	1	4	6	7	17	–10
Turkey	Fenerbahçe	2	1	0	1	3	3	±0
Turkey	İstanbul Başakşehir	2	0	1	1	1	2	–1
Subtotal		4	1	1	2	4	5	–1
Ukraine	Chornomorets Odesa	2	1	1	0	2	1	+1
Subtotal		2	1	1	0	2	1	+1
Wales	The New Saints	2	2	0	0	9	0	+9
Subtotal		2	2	0	0	9	0	+9
Total		181	63	46	72	251	248	+3

== Match results ==
As of 14 August 2026

Season	Competition	Round	Opponent	Home	Away	Aggregate
2012–13	UEFA Champions League	2Q	(Croatia) Dinamo Zagreb	1–1	2–3	3–4
2013–14	UEFA Champions League	2Q	(Slovakia) Slovan Bratislava	3–0	1–2	4–2
2013–14	UEFA Champions League	3Q	(Serbia) Partizan	2–1	1–0	3–1
2013–14	UEFA Champions League	PO	(Switzerland) Basel	2–4	0–2	2–6
2013–14	UEFA Europa League	Group B	(Netherlands) PSV Eindhoven	2–0	2–0	1st
2013–14	UEFA Europa League	Group B	(Croatia) Dinamo Zagreb	3–0	2–1	1st
2013–14	UEFA Europa League	Group B	(Ukraine) Chornomorets Odesa	1–1	1–0	1st
2013–14	UEFA Europa League	Round of 32	(Italy) Lazio	3–3	1–0	4–3
2013–14	UEFA Europa League	Round of 16	(Spain) Valencia	0–3	0–1	0–4
2014–15	UEFA Champions League	2Q	(Luxembourg) F91 Dudelange	4–0	1–1	5–1
2014–15	UEFA Champions League	3Q	(Serbia) Partizan	0–0	2–2	2–2 (a)
2014–15	UEFA Champions League	PO	(Romania) Steaua București	1–0 (a.e.t.)	0–1	1–1 (6–5 p)
2014–15	UEFA Champions League	Group B	(Spain) Real Madrid	1–2	0–4	4th
2014–15	UEFA Champions League	Group B	(Switzerland) Basel	1–0	0–4	4th
2014–15	UEFA Champions League	Group B	(England) Liverpool	2–2	1–2	4th
2015–16	UEFA Champions League	2Q	(Moldova) Milsami Orhei	0–1	1–2	1–3
2016–17	UEFA Champions League	2Q	(Montenegro) Mladost Podgorica	2–0	3–0	5–0
2016–17	UEFA Champions League	3Q	(Serbia) Red Star Belgrade	2–2	4–2 (a.e.t.)	6–4
2016–17	UEFA Champions League	PO	(Czech Republic) Viktoria Plzeň	2–0	2–2	4–2
2016–17	UEFA Champions League	Group A	(France) Paris Saint-Germain	1–3	2–2	3rd
2016–17	UEFA Champions League	Group A	(England) Arsenal	2–3	0–6	3rd
2016–17	UEFA Champions League	Group A	(Switzerland) Basel	0–0	1–1	3rd
2016–17	UEFA Europa League	Round of 32	(Denmark) Copenhagen	1–2	0–0	1–2
2017–18	UEFA Champions League	2Q	(Lithuania) Žalgiris	4–1	1–2	5–3
2017–18	UEFA Champions League	3Q	(Israel) Hapoel Be'er Sheva	3–1	0–2	3–3 (a)
2017–18	UEFA Europa League	PO	(Lithuania) Sūduva Marijampolė	2–0	0–0	2–0
2017–18	UEFA Europa League	Group C	(Portugal) Braga	1–1	2–0	2nd
2017–18	UEFA Europa League	Group C	(Germany) TSG Hoffenheim	2–1	1–1	2nd
2017–18	UEFA Europa League	Group C	(Turkey) İstanbul Başakşehir	1–2	0–0	2nd
2017–18	UEFA Europa League	Round of 32	(Italy) Milan	0–3	0–1	0–4
2018–19	UEFA Champions League	1Q	(Northern Ireland) Crusaders	7–0	2–0	9–0
2018–19	UEFA Champions League	2Q	(Hungary) Vidi	0–0	0–1	0–1
2018–19	UEFA Europa League	3Q	(Bosnia and Herzegovina) Zrinjski Mostar	1–0	1–1	2–1
2018–19	UEFA Europa League	PO	(Georgia (country)) Torpedo Kutaisi	4–0	1–0	5–0
2018–19	UEFA Europa League	Group A	(Germany) Bayer Leverkusen	2–3	1–1	4th
2018–19	UEFA Europa League	Group A	(Switzerland) Zürich	1–1	0–1	4th
2018–19	UEFA Europa League	Group A	(Cyprus) AEK Larnaca	0–0	1–1	4th
2019–20	UEFA Champions League	1Q	(Hungary) Ferencváros	2−3	1−2	3−5
2019–20	UEFA Europa League	2Q	(Iceland) Valur	4–0	1–1	5–1
2019–20	UEFA Europa League	3Q	(Wales) The New Saints	5–0	4–0	9–0
2019–20	UEFA Europa League	PO	(Slovenia) Maribor	0–0	2–2	2–2 (a)
2019–20	UEFA Europa League	Group H	(Russia) CSKA Moscow	5–1	1–1	2nd
2019–20	UEFA Europa League	Group H	(Hungary) Ferencváros	1–1	3–0	2nd
2019–20	UEFA Europa League	Group H	(Spain) Espanyol	0–1	0–6	2nd
2019–20	UEFA Europa League	Round of 32	(Italy) Inter Milan	0–2	1–2	1–4
2020–21	UEFA Champions League	1Q	(Montenegro) Budućnost Podgorica	—N/a	3–1	—N/a
2020–21	UEFA Champions League	2Q	(Denmark) Midtjylland	0–1	—N/a	—N/a
2020–21	UEFA Europa League	3Q	Bye	—N/a	—N/a	—N/a
2020–21	UEFA Europa League	PO	(Belarus) Dynamo Brest	—N/a	2–0	—N/a
2020–21	UEFA Europa League	Group J	(England) Tottenham Hotspur	1–3	0–4	4th
2020–21	UEFA Europa League	Group J	(Austria) LASK	1–3	3–4	4th
2020–21	UEFA Europa League	Group J	(Belgium) Antwerp	1–2	1–3	4th
2021–22	UEFA Champions League	1Q	(Belarus) Shakhtyor Soligorsk	1–0	1–0	2–0
2021–22	UEFA Champions League	2Q	(Slovenia) Mura	3–1	0–0	3–1
2021–22	UEFA Champions League	3Q	(Greece) Olympiacos	2–2 (a.e.t.)	1–1	3–3 (4–1 p)
2021–22	UEFA Champions League	PO	(Sweden) Malmö FF	2–1	0–2	2–3
2021–22	UEFA Europa League	Group F	(Denmark) Midtjylland	0–0	1–1	4th
2021–22	UEFA Europa League	Group F	(Serbia) Red Star Belgrade	0–1	0–1	4th
2021–22	UEFA Europa League	Group F	(Portugal) Braga	0–1	2–4	4th
2022–23	UEFA Champions League	1Q	(Montenegro) Sutjeska Nikšić	2–0	1–0	3–0
2022–23	UEFA Champions League	2Q	(Republic of Ireland) Shamrock Rovers	3–0	1–2	4–2
2022–23	UEFA Champions League	3Q	(Croatia) Dinamo Zagreb	1–2	2–4	3–6
2022–23	UEFA Europa League	PO	(Lithuania) Žalgiris	1–0	3–3 (a.e.t.)	4–3
2022–23	UEFA Europa League	Group C	(Italy) Roma	2–1	1–3	3rd
2022–23	UEFA Europa League	Group C	(Spain) Real Betis	0–1	2–3	3rd
2022–23	UEFA Europa League	Group C	(Finland) HJK	2–0	1–1	3rd
2022–23	UEFA Europa Conference League	KPO	(Belgium) Anderlecht	1–0	1–2 (a.e.t.)	2–2 (0–3 p)
2023–24	UEFA Champions League	1Q	(Kosovo) Ballkani	4–0	0–2	4–2
2023–24	UEFA Champions League	2Q	(Slovenia) Olimpija	1–1	1–2	2–3
2023–24	UEFA Europa League	3Q	(Kazakhstan) Astana	5–1	1–2	6–3
2023–24	UEFA Europa League	PO	(Netherlands) Ajax	1–4	1–0	2–4
2023–24	UEFA Europa Conference League	Group H	(Turkey) Fenerbahçe	2–0	1–3	2nd
2023–24	UEFA Europa Conference League	Group H	(Slovakia) Spartak Trnava	4–0	2–1	2nd
2023–24	UEFA Europa Conference League	Group H	(Denmark) Nordsjælland	1–0	1–7	2nd
2023–24	UEFA Europa Conference League	KPO	(Switzerland) Servette	0–1	0–0	0–1
2024–25	UEFA Champions League	1Q	(Georgia (country)) Dinamo Batumi	3–1	0–1	3–2
2024–25	UEFA Champions League	2Q	(Belarus) Dinamo Minsk	2–0	0–1	2–1
2024–25	UEFA Champions League	3Q	(Azerbaijan) Qarabağ	2–7 (a.e.t.)	2–1	4–8
2024–25	UEFA Europa League	PO	(Moldova) Petrocub Hîncești	4–0	2–1	6–1
2024–25	UEFA Europa League	LP	(Czech Republic) Slavia Prague	0–2	—N/a	33rd
2024–25	UEFA Europa League	LP	(Czech Republic) Viktoria Plzeň	—N/a	0–0	33rd
2024–25	UEFA Europa League	LP	(Belgium) Anderlecht	—N/a	0–2	33rd
2024–25	UEFA Europa League	LP	(Spain) Athletic Bilbao	1–2	—N/a	33rd
2024–25	UEFA Europa League	LP	(Italy) Lazio	—N/a	0–0	33rd
2024–25	UEFA Europa League	LP	(Netherlands) AZ	2–2	—N/a	33rd
2024–25	UEFA Europa League	LP	(Denmark) Midtjylland	0–2	—N/a	33rd
2024–25	UEFA Europa League	LP	(France) Lyon	—N/a	1–1	33rd
2025–26	UEFA Champions League	1Q	(Belarus) Dinamo Minsk	1–0	2–2 (a.e.t.)	3–2
2025–26	UEFA Champions League	2Q	(Croatia) Rijeka	3–1 (a.e.t.)	0–0	3–1
2025–26	UEFA Champions League	3Q	(Hungary) Ferencváros	0–0	0–3	0–3
2025–26	UEFA Europa League	PO	(North Macedonia) Shkëndija	4–1 (a.e.t.)	1–2	5–3
2025–26	UEFA Europa League	LP	(Sweden) Malmö FF	—N/a	2–1	22nd
2025–26	UEFA Europa League	LP	(Spain) Real Betis	0–2	—N/a	22nd
2025–26	UEFA Europa League	LP	(Switzerland) Young Boys	—N/a	2–3	22nd
2025–26	UEFA Europa League	LP	(Hungary) Ferencváros	—N/a	1–3	22nd
2025–26	UEFA Europa League	LP	(Spain) Celta Vigo	3–2	—N/a	22nd
2025–26	UEFA Europa League	LP	(Greece) PAOK	3–3	—N/a	22nd
2025–26	UEFA Europa League	LP	(Scotland) Rangers	—N/a	0–1	22nd
2025–26	UEFA Europa League	LP	(France) Nice	1–0	—N/a	22nd
2025–26	UEFA Europa League	KPO	(Hungary) Ferencváros	2–1	0–2	2–3
2026–27	UEFA Europa Conference League	2Q	(Israel) Hapoel Tel Aviv	2–2	0–2	2–4

Notes

- 1Q: First qualifying round
- 2Q: Second qualifying round
- 3Q: Third qualifying round
- PO: Play-off round
- KPO: Knockout phase play-offs

== Achievements and records ==
- Biggest European home win: Ludogorets 7–0 (Northern Ireland) Crusaders (11 July 2018, UEFA Champions league qualifying round first leg)
- Biggest European away win: (Wales) The New Saints 0–4 Ludogorets (15 August 2019, UEFA Europa League Third qualifying round second leg)
- Biggest European home defeat: Ludogorets 2–7 (Azerbaijan) Qarabağ (13 August 2024, UEFA Champions League third qualifying round);
- Biggest European away defeat: (Denmark) Nordsjælland 7–1 Ludogorets (5 October 2023, UEFA Europa Conference League group stage); (England) Arsenal 6–0 Ludogorets (19 October 2016, UEFA Champions League group stage); (Spain) Espanyol 6–0 Ludogorets (7 November 2019, UEFA Europa League group stage)
- Ludogorets became the first Bulgarian team to begin their group stage participation in European tournaments with 3 consecutive wins, when in the 2013–14 UEFA Europa League group stage they recorded consecutive wins against PSV Eindhoven (2–0), Dinamo Zagreb (3–0) and Chornomorets Odesa (1–0), without conceding a goal in any of the games.
- After the end of the Round of 32 in the 2013–14 UEFA Europa League, Ludogorets became the first Bulgarian team to record 9 wins in European competitions in a single season, as well as the first Bulgarian team to record 5 away wins in European competitions in a single season.
- During the 2014-15 UEFA Champions League, Ludogorets became the second Bulgarian team to reach the group stages of the competition, the first being Levski Sofia in 2006–07.
- During the 2014–15 UEFA Champions League group stage, Ludogorets became the first Bulgarian team to record points in that competition when they defeated Basel 1–0 at home. This was also the first home win for a Bulgarian team in the UEFA Champions League, and was followed by a 2–2 home draw with Liverpool.
- Ludogorets became the first Bulgarian team to qualify twice for the Champions League group stage, achieving the feat during the 2016–17 season of the tournament. During that season, the team set a new record for most goals scored (6), and became the first Bulgarian team to avoid finishing last in their group.
- As of the 2017–18 season Ludogorets holds the record for most points scored in the UEFA Champions League group stage by a Bulgarian team with 4, most goals scored with 6, and fewest goals conceded with 14.

=== Goalscoring and appearance records ===
As of 26 February 2026

**Most appearances for the club in European competitions**

Rank	Player	Career	Appearances
1	(Bulgaria) **Anton Nedyalkov**	2018–	85
2	(Romania) Cosmin Moți	2012–2021	81
3	(Bulgaria) Marcelinho	2011–2020	80
4	(Bulgaria) Svetoslav Dyakov	2011–2021	78
5	(Benin) **Olivier Verdon**	2020–	75
6	(Brazil) Wanderson	2014–2022	70
7	(Ghana) **Bernard Tekpetey**	2021–	66
8	(Brazil) Cicinho	2015–2023	65
9	(Romania) Claudiu Keșerü	2015–2021	57
10	(Madagascar) Anicet Abel	2014–2021	53

**Most goals for the club in European competitions**

Rank	Player	Career	Goals
1	(Romania) Claudiu Keșerü	2015–2021	16
2	(Brazil) Wanderson	2014–2022	15
3	(Bulgaria) Marcelinho	2011–2020	14
4	(Democratic Republic of the Congo) Jody Lukoki	2015–2020	10
4	(Poland) Jakub Świerczok	2018–2020	10
6	(Bulgaria) Kiril Despodov	2020–2023	9
7	(Slovenia) Roman Bezjak	2012–2015	8
7	(Ghana) **Bernard Tekpetey**	2021–	8
9	(Netherlands) Virgil Misidjan	2013–2018	7
9	(Cyprus) Pieros Sotiriou	2021–2022	7
9	(Serbia) **Petar Stanić**	2025–	7
9	(Argentina) Matías Tissera	2022–2025	7

- Players in **bold** are still playing for Ludogorets.
- Players with 3 or more goals for Ludogorets in Europe are listed.
- Includes appearances in UEFA Champions League, UEFA Europa League, and UEFA Conference League.
