= Ymer =

Ymer can mean:

- Ymer (dairy product), a Danish soured milk product
- Ymer (1976 icebreaker), a Swedish icebreaker
- Ymer, the first modern housing cooperative in Uppsala, Sweden
- Ymer (journal), a Swedish yearbook on geography published since 1881
- Ymer Island, East Greenland
- Ymer Nunatak, Northeast Greenland
- Ymerbukta, Svalbard

== People ==
=== Given name ===
- Ymer Berisha (1912–1946), Albanian secondary-school teacher in Prishtina
- Ymer Deliallisi (1872–1944), Albanian politician
- Ymer Dishnica (1912−1998), Albanian politician and physician
- Ymer Pampuri (1944–2017), Albanian weightlifter
- Ymer Prizreni (c. 1820−1887), Albanian politician and diplomat
- Ymer Saraçi, Albanian politician
- Ymer Shaba (born 1998), Albanian footballer

=== Surname ===
- Mikael Ymer (born 1998), Ethiopian tennis player representing Sweden.
- Elias Ymer (born 1996), Ethiopian tennis player representing Sweden.

See also:

- Ymir
