= Rúnar Már Sigurjónsson =

Icelandic footballer (born 1990)

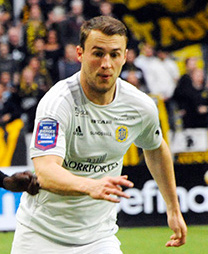
- Rúnar with GIF Sundsvall in 2015

Personal information
- Full name: Rúnar Már Sigurlaugarson Sigurjónsson
- Date of birth: 18 June 1990 (age 36)
- Place of birth: Sauðárkrókur, Iceland
- Height: 1.78 m (5 ft 10 in)
- Position: Midfielder

Team information
- Current team: ÍA
- Number: 16

Youth career
- –2004: Tindastóll

Senior career*
Years	Team	Apps	(Gls)
2005–2007	Tindastóll	22	(5)
2007–2008	Ýmir	7	(1)
2008–2009	HK	33	(6)
2010–2013	Valur	70	(13)
2013	→ Zwolle (loan)	0	(0)
2013–2016	Sundsvall	72	(12)
2016–2019	Grasshoppers	59	(10)
2018	→ St. Gallen (loan)	15	(6)
2019–2021	Astana	26	(8)
2021–2022	CFR Cluj	24	(6)
2023–2024	Voluntari	23	(6)
2024–	ÍA	44	(4)

International career^{‡}
2008	Iceland U19	5	(0)
2011–2012	Iceland U21	3	(1)
2012–2021	Iceland	32	(2)
- * Club domestic league appearances and goals as of 1 November 2026 ‡ National team caps and goals as of 31 March 2021

Rúnar Már Sigurlaugarson Sigurjónsson (born 18 June 1990) is an Icelandic professional footballer who plays as a midfielder for Besta deild karla club ÍA.

He started out his senior career at local team Tindastóll, after which he went on to compete professionally in the Netherlands, Sweden, Switzerland, Kazakhstan and Romania.

Rúnar recorded his full debut for Iceland in November 2012, in a 2–0 friendly win over Andorra in which he scored. He was selected for the UEFA Euro 2016, but did not make any appearances in the tournament.

== Club career ==
=== Early career ===
Rúnar started his career at hometown club Tindastóll before switching to HK when he moved to the Capital Region at 17 years of age. He played a season with HK's reserve side, Ýmir, in the lowest league before being promoted to the senior squad, managing by that time to have featured in all four divisions of Icelandic football after appearing in the 2009 1. deild karla.

=== Valur ===
After two seasons with HK's senior squad, he switched to Valur before the 2010 Úrvalsdeild season.

==== Loan to Zwolle ====
After the 2012 season, on 31 January 2013, Rúnar signed with Dutch Eredivisie side Zwolle on loan until the end of the 2012–2013 season, with an option for two more seasons. Shortly after arriving in the Netherlands he was injured and consequently could not play. In late April it was announced that he would be returning to Valur for the 2013 Icelandic season, although, due to his injury, he could not be sure when he would start playing. Rúnar was cleared to play with Valur on 3 May 2013.

=== Sundsvall ===
On 6 August 2013, it was announced that Rúnar had moved to Swedish Superettan side Sundsvall, with Rúnar signing a contract until the end of 2016.

=== Grasshoppers ===
In the summer of 2016 he was sold to Swiss Super League club Grasshoppers for a sum around €350,000.

=== Astana ===
On 17 June 2019, Rúnar signed for Astana following the expiration of his Grasshoppers contract.

=== CFR Cluj ===
On 8 February 2021, Rúnar signed for Romanian team CFR Cluj on a free transfer. Over the course of one and a half seasons, he amassed eight goals from 37 appearances in all competitions and won three domestic trophies.

=== Voluntari ===
On 20 December 2022, Voluntari announced the signing of Rúnar.

=== ÍA ===
On 19 April, ÍA announced the signing of Rúnar.

== International career ==
Rúnar played eight games for the youth sides of Iceland. After a good 2012 season, during which he scored 7 goals, he was picked for the senior squad for a FIFA World Cup 2014 qualifier match against Switzerland in October 2012 but was an unused substitute. A month later he started in a friendly match against Andorra, scoring the second goal of the game on his debut, a 2–0 win for Iceland.

He was selected for UEFA Euro 2016.

In 2021, Rúnar was removed from the national team and has not appeared for his country since.

== Career statistics ==
=== Club ===
As of match played 22 December 2023

Appearances and goals by club, season and competition
Club	Season	League			National Cup		League Cup		Continental		Other		Total	
Club	Season	Division	Apps	Goals	Apps	Goals	Apps	Goals	Apps	Goals	Apps	Goals	Apps	Goals
Tindastóll	2005	2. deild	10	1	1	0	3	1	—		—		14	2
Tindastóll	2006	3. deild	12	4	2	0	0	0	—		—		14	4
Tindastóll	Total		22	5	3	0	3	1	—		—		28	6
Ýmir	2007	3. deild	7	1	2	0	0	0	—		—		9	1
HK	2008	Úrvalsdeild	12	2	1	0	0	0	—		—		13	2
HK	2009	1. deild	21	4	3	0	6	3	—		—		30	7
HK	Total		33	6	4	0	6	3	—		—		43	9
Valur	2010	Úrvalsdeild	20	1	3	1	9	1	—		—		32	3
Valur	2011	Úrvalsdeild	18	2	1	0	8	3	—		—		27	5
Valur	2012	Úrvalsdeild	22	7	2	1	7	4	—		—		31	12
Valur	2013	Úrvalsdeild	10	3	1	1	—		—		—		11	4
Valur	Total		70	13	7	3	24	8	—		—		101	24
PEC (loan)	2012–2013	Eredivisie	0	0	0	0	—		—		—		0	0
Sundsvall	2013	Superettan	5	0	3	0	—		—		—		8	0
Sundsvall	2014	Superettan	28	2	1	0	—		—		—		29	2
Sundsvall	2015	Allsvenskan	27	4	2	0	—		—		—		29	4
Sundsvall	2016	Allsvenskan	12	6	0	0	—		—		—		12	6
Sundsvall	Total		72	12	6	0	—		—		—		78	12
Grasshopper	2016–17	Swiss Super League	31	7	2	1	—		6	2	—		39	10
Grasshopper	2017–18	Swiss Super League	12	3	0	0	—		—		—		12	3
Grasshopper	2018–19	Swiss Super League	16	0	0	0	—		—		—		16	0
Grasshopper	Total		59	10	2	1	—		6	2	—		67	13
St. Gallen (loan)	2017–18	Swiss Super League	15	6	0	0	—		—		—		15	6
Astana	2019	Kazakhstan Premier League	11	2	0	0	—		12	5	0	0	23	7
Astana	2020	Kazakhstan Premier League	15	6	0	0	—		1	0	1	0	17	6
Astana	Total		26	8	0	0	—		13	5	1	0	40	13
CFR Cluj	2020–21	Liga I	12	3	0	0	—		0	0	1	0	13	3
CFR Cluj	2021–22	Liga I	12	3	1	0	—		10	2	1	0	24	5
CFR Cluj	Total		24	6	1	0	—		10	2	2	0	37	8
Voluntari	2022–23	Liga I	12	4	—		—		—		1 (Note: Appearance in Liga I European play-offs)	1	13	5
Voluntari	2023–24	Liga I	11	2	2	0	—		—		—		13	2
Voluntari	Total		23	6	2	0	—		—		1	1	26	7
Career total			351	73	27	4	33	12	29	9	4	1	444	99

=== International ===
As of match played 31 March 2021

Appearances and goals by national team and year
National team	Year	Apps	Goals
Iceland	2012	1	1
Iceland	2013	0	0
Iceland	2014	0	0
Iceland	2015	5	0
Iceland	2016	6	0
Iceland	2017	3	0
Iceland	2018	4	0
Iceland	2019	6	0
Iceland	2020	5	0
Iceland	2021	2	1
Total		32	2

Scores and results list Iceland's goal tally first, score column indicates score after each Rúnar goal.

List of international goals scored by Rúnar Már Sigurjónsson
No.	Date	Venue	Opponent	Score	Result	Competition
1	14 November 2012	Camp d'Esports d'Aixovall, Aixovall, Andorra	Andorra	2–0	2–0	Friendly
2	31 March 2021	Rheinpark Stadion, Vaduz, Liechtenstein	Liechtenstein	4–1	4–1	2022 FIFA World Cup qualification

== Honours ==
Valur

- Icelandic League Cup: 2011

Astana

- Kazakhstan Premier League: 2019
- Kazakhstan Super Cup: 2020

CFR Cluj

- Liga I: 2020–21, 2021–22
- Supercupa României: 2020; runner-up: 2021
