= Ymir (disambiguation) =

Ymir is the father of the race of giants in Norse mythology and the grandfather of Odin, King of the Gods.

Ymir may also refer to:

- Ymir (moon), a moon of Saturn named after the giant
- Ymir (Marvel Comics), the equivalent being as represented in the universe of Marvel Comics
- Ymir, British Columbia, a town in British Columbia's Kootenay district
- Two different characters in the Japanese manga and anime series Attack on Titan:
  - Ymir, an owner of the Jaw Titan
  - Ymir Fritz (a.k.a. Ymir the Founder)
- Ymir (electoral district), a now defunct provincial electoral district of British Columbia
- Ymir, the Venusian creature from the film 20 Million Miles to Earth
- Ýmir, an Icelandic sailing club from Kópavogur. They also operate as the B team for the football division of HK

== See also ==
- Ymer (disambiguation)
