= 2021–22 UEFA Champions League qualifying =

European football tournament

2021–22 UEFA Champions League qualifying was the preliminary phase of the 2021–22 UEFA Champions League, prior to the competition proper. Qualification consisted of the qualifying phase (preliminary and first to third rounds) and the play-off round. It began on 22 June and ended on 25 August 2021.

A total of 54 teams competed in the qualifying system of the 2021–22 UEFA Champions League, with 43 teams in Champions Path and 11 teams in League Path. The six winners in the play-off round (four from Champions Path, two from League Path) advanced to the group stage, to join the 26 teams that enter in the group stage.

Times are CEST (UTC+2), as listed by UEFA (local times, if different, are in parentheses).

== Teams ==
=== Champions Path ===
The Champions Path includes all league champions which do not qualify directly for the group stage, and consists of the following rounds:

- Preliminary round (4 teams playing one-legged semi-finals and final): 4 teams which enter in this round.
- First qualifying round (32 teams): 31 teams which enter in this round, and 1 winner of the preliminary round.
- Second qualifying round (20 teams): 4 teams which enter in this round, and 16 winners of the first qualifying round.
- Third qualifying round (12 teams): 2 teams which enter in this round, and 10 winners of the second qualifying round.
- Play-off round (8 teams): 2 teams which enter in this round, and 6 winners of the third qualifying round.

All teams eliminated from the Champions Path enter either the Europa League or the Europa Conference League:

- The 3 losers of the preliminary round and 15 losers of the first qualifying round enter the Europa Conference League Champions Path second qualifying round.
- The 1 drawn loser of the first qualifying round enters the Europa Conference League Champions Path third qualifying round.
- The 10 losers of the second qualifying round enter the Europa League Champions Path qualifying round
- The 6 losers of the third qualifying round enter the Europa League play-off round.
- The 4 losers of the play-off round enter the Europa League group stage.

Below are the participating teams of the Champions Path (with their 2021 UEFA club coefficients), grouped by their starting rounds.

Key to colours
Winners of play-off round advance to group stage
Losers of play-off round enter Europa League group stage
Losers of third qualifying round enter Europa League play-off round
Losers of second qualifying round enter Europa League qualifying round
Drawn loser of the first qualifying round enters Europa Conference League third qualifying round
Losers of the preliminary round and first qualifying round enter Europa Conference League second qualifying round

Play-off round
Team	Coeff.
(Austria) Red Bull Salzburg	59.000
(Denmark) Brøndby	7.000

Third qualifying round
Team	Coeff.
(Czech Republic) Slavia Prague	43.500
(Scotland) Rangers	31.250

Second qualifying round
Team	Coeff.
(Greece) Olympiacos	43.000
(Switzerland) Young Boys	35.000
(Serbia) Red Star Belgrade	32.500
(Cyprus) Omonia	5.550

First qualifying round
Team	Coeff.
(Croatia) Dinamo Zagreb	44.500
(Bulgaria) Ludogorets Razgrad	28.000
(Sweden) Malmö FF	18.500
(Romania) CFR Cluj	16.500
(Poland) Legia Warsaw	16.500
(Moldova) Sheriff Tiraspol	14.500
(Hungary) Ferencváros	13.500
(North Macedonia) Shkëndija	9.000
(Slovakia) Slovan Bratislava	7.500
(Georgia (country)) Dinamo Tbilisi	6.500
(Lithuania) Žalgiris	6.500
(Armenia) Alashkert	6.500
(Estonia) Flora	6.250
(Montenegro) Budućnost Podgorica	6.000
(Kazakhstan) Kairat	6.000
(Gibraltar) Lincoln Red Imps	5.750
(Latvia) Riga	5.500
(Finland) HJK	5.500
(Northern Ireland) Linfield	5.250
(Luxembourg) Fola Esch	5.250
(Belarus) Shakhtyor Soligorsk	5.250
(Azerbaijan) Neftçi	5.000
(Israel) Maccabi Haifa	4.875
(Republic of Ireland) Shamrock Rovers	4.750
(Wales) Connah's Quay Nomads	4.750
(Iceland) Valur	4.250
(Norway) Bodø/Glimt	4.200
(Malta) Hibernians	3.750
(Slovenia) Mura	3.000
(Albania) Teuta	2.750
(Bosnia and Herzegovina) Borac Banja Luka	1.600

Preliminary round
Team	Coeff.
(Faroe Islands) HB	2.250
(Kosovo) Prishtina	2.250
(Andorra) Inter Club d'Escaldes	1.500
(San Marino) Folgore	1.000

=== League Path ===
The League Path includes all league non-champions which do not qualify directly for the group stage, and consists of the following rounds:

- Second qualifying round (6 teams): 6 teams which enter in this round.
- Third qualifying round (8 teams): 5 teams which enter in this round, and 3 winners of the second qualifying round.
- Play-off round (4 teams): 4 winners of the third qualifying round.

All teams eliminated from the League Path enter the Europa League:

- The 3 losers of the second qualifying round enter the Main Path qualifying round.
- The 4 losers of the third qualifying round and the 2 losers of the play-off round enter the group stage.

Below are the participating teams of the League Path (with their 2021 UEFA club coefficients), grouped by their starting rounds.

Key to colours
Winners of play-off round advance to group stage
Losers of play-off round and third qualifying round enter Europa League group stage
Losers of second qualifying round enter Europa League qualifying round

Third qualifying round
Team	Coeff.
(Ukraine) Shakhtar Donetsk	79.000
(Portugal) Benfica	58.000
(France) Monaco	36.000
(Belgium) Genk	30.000
(Russia) Spartak Moscow	18.500

Second qualifying round
Team	Coeff.
(Scotland) Celtic	34.000
(Netherlands) PSV Eindhoven	29.000
(Czech Republic) Sparta Prague	17.500
(Austria) Rapid Wien	17.000
(Turkey) Galatasaray	17.000
(Denmark) Midtjylland	13.500

== Format ==
Each tie, apart from the preliminary round, was played over two legs, with each team playing one leg at home. The team that scored more goals on aggregate over the two legs advanced to the next round. If the aggregate score was level at the end of normal time of the second leg, the away goals rule was no longer applied starting from this season. To decide the winner of the tie, extra time was played, and if the same number of goals were scored by both teams during extra time, the tie was decided by a penalty shoot-out. In the preliminary round, where single-match semi-finals and final were hosted by one of the participating teams, if the score was level at the end of normal time, extra time was played, and if the same number of goals were scored by both teams during extra time, the tie was decided by a penalty shoot-out.

In the draws for each round, teams were seeded based on their UEFA club coefficients at the beginning of the season, with the teams divided into seeded and unseeded pots containing the same number of teams. A seeded team was drawn against an unseeded team, with the order of legs (or the administrative "home" team in the preliminary round matches) in each tie decided by draw. As the identity of the winners of the previous round was not known at the time of the draws, the seeding was carried out under the assumption that the team with the higher coefficient of an undecided tie advanced to this round, which meant if the team with the lower coefficient was to advance, it simply took the seeding of its opponent. Prior to the draws, UEFA could form "groups" in accordance with the principles set by the Club Competitions Committee, but they were purely for convenience of the draw and do not resemble any real groupings in the sense of the competition. Teams from associations with political conflicts as decided by UEFA could not be drawn into the same tie. After the draws, the order of legs of a tie could be reversed by UEFA due to scheduling or venue conflicts.

== Schedule ==
The schedule of the competition was as follows (all draws were held at the UEFA headquarters in Nyon, Switzerland).

Schedule for the qualifying phase of the 2021–22 UEFA Champions League
Round	Draw date	First leg	Second leg
Preliminary round	8 June 2021	22 June 2021 (semi-finals)	25 June 2021 (final)
First qualifying round	15 June 2021	6–7 July 2021	13–14 July 2021
Second qualifying round	16 June 2021	20–21 July 2021	27–28 July 2021
Third qualifying round	19 July 2021	3–4 August 2021	10 August 2021
Play-offs	2 August 2021	17–18 August 2021	24–25 August 2021

== Preliminary round ==
The draw for the preliminary round was held on 8 June 2021, 12:00 CEST.

=== Seeding ===
A total of four teams played in the preliminary round. Seeding of teams was based on their 2021 UEFA club coefficients, with two seeded teams and two unseeded teams in the semi-final round. The first team drawn in each tie in the semi-final round, and also the final round (between the two winners of the semi-finals, whose identity was not known at the time of draw), would be the "home" team for administrative purposes.

Seeded	Unseeded
(Faroe Islands) HB; (Kosovo) Prishtina	(Andorra) Inter Club d'Escaldes; (San Marino) Folgore

=== Bracket ===
Semi-final round
22 June – Elbasan
(San Marino) Folgore	0
(Kosovo) Prishtina	2
22 June – Durrës
(Faroe Islands) HB	0
(Andorra) Inter Club d'Escaldes	1

Final round
25 June – Elbasan
(Kosovo) Prishtina	2
(Andorra) Inter Club d'Escaldes	0

=== Summary ===
The preliminary round matches, which consisted of two semi-finals on 22 June 2021 and the final on 25 June 2021, were originally to be played at Gundadalur, Tórshavn in the Faroe Islands, but were moved due to restrictions related to the COVID-19 pandemic in the Faroe Islands. The matches were instead played in Albania, with the semi-finals at Elbasan Arena, Elbasan and Niko Dovana Stadium, Durrës, and the final at Elbasan Arena.

The winner of the preliminary round final advanced to the first qualifying round. The losers of the semi-finals and final were transferred to the Europa Conference League Champions Path second qualifying round.

Team 1	Score	Team 2
Semi-final round
Folgore (San Marino)	0–2	(Kosovo) Prishtina
HB (Faroe Islands)	0–1	(Andorra) Inter Club d'Escaldes
Final round
Prishtina (Kosovo)	2–0	(Andorra) Inter Club d'Escaldes

=== Semi-final round ===
22 June 2021
20:00

Folgore (San Marino)	0–2	(Kosovo) Prishtina
	Report	E. Krasniqi 51'; Hoti 90+1'

Elbasan Arena, Elbasan
Attendance: 0 (Note: Due to the COVID-19 pandemic in Europe, the match was played behind closed doors.)
Referee: Joni Hyytiä (Finland)

22 June 2021
20:00

HB (Faroe Islands)	0–1	(Andorra) Inter Club d'Escaldes
	Report	Betriu 61'

Niko Dovana Stadium, Durrës
Attendance: 0
Referee: Joonas Jaanovits (Estonia)

=== Final round ===
25 June 2021
20:00

Prishtina (Kosovo)	2–0	(Andorra) Inter Club d'Escaldes
E. Krasniqi 45', 58'	Report

Elbasan Arena, Elbasan
Attendance: 0
Referee: Adam Ladebäck (Sweden)

== First qualifying round ==
The draw for the first qualifying round was held on 15 June 2021, 12:00 CEST.

=== Seeding ===
A total of 32 teams played in the first qualifying round: 31 teams which entered in this round, and 1 winner of the preliminary round. Seeding of teams was based on their 2021 UEFA club coefficients. For the winner of the preliminary round, whose identity was not known at the time of draw, the club coefficient of the highest-ranked remaining team was used. Prior to the draw, UEFA formed four groups of four seeded teams and four unseeded teams in accordance with the principles set by the Club Competitions Committee. The first team drawn in each tie would be the home team of the first leg.

Group 1		Group 2	
Seeded	Unseeded	Seeded	Unseeded
(Sweden) Malmö FF; (Poland) Legia Warsaw; (Slovakia) Slovan Bratislava; (Gibraltar) Lincoln Red Imps	(Latvia) Riga; (Luxembourg) Fola Esch; (Republic of Ireland) Shamrock Rovers; (Norway) Bodø/Glimt	(Romania) CFR Cluj; (North Macedonia) Shkëndija; (Armenia) Alashkert; (Montenegro) Budućnost Podgorica	(Finland) HJK; (Wales) Connah's Quay Nomads; (Slovenia) Mura; (Bosnia and Herzegovina) Borac Banja Luka
Group 3		Group 4	
Seeded	Unseeded	Seeded	Unseeded
(Bulgaria) Ludogorets Razgrad; (Moldova) Sheriff Tiraspol; (Georgia (country)) Dinamo Tbilisi; (Kazakhstan) Kairat	(Belarus) Shakhtyor Soligorsk; (Azerbaijan) Neftçi; (Israel) Maccabi Haifa; (Albania) Teuta	(Croatia) Dinamo Zagreb; (Hungary) Ferencváros; (Lithuania) Žalgiris; (Estonia) Flora	(Northern Ireland) Linfield; (Iceland) Valur; (Malta) Hibernians; (Kosovo) Prishtina

Notes

1. ^{†} Winner of the preliminary round, whose identity was not known at the time of draw. Teams in italics defeated a team with a higher coefficient, thus effectively taking the coefficient of their opponent in the draw.

=== Summary ===
The first legs were played on 6 and 7 July, and the second legs were played on 13 and 14 July 2021.

The winners of the ties advanced to the Champions Path second qualifying round. The losers were transferred to the Europa Conference League Champions Path second qualifying round.

Team 1	Agg.	Team 2	1st leg	2nd leg
Fola Esch (Luxembourg)	2–7	(Gibraltar) Lincoln Red Imps	2–2	0–5
Slovan Bratislava (Slovakia)	3–2 (Note: Losers drawn to receive a bye to the Europa Conference League third qualifying round.)	(Republic of Ireland) Shamrock Rovers	2–0	1–2
Malmö FF (Sweden)	2–1	(Latvia) Riga	1–0	1–1
Bodø/Glimt (Norway)	2–5	(Poland) Legia Warsaw	2–3	0–2
Connah's Quay Nomads (Wales)	2–3	(Armenia) Alashkert	2–2	0–1 (a.e.t.)
HJK (Finland)	7–1	(Montenegro) Budućnost Podgorica	3–1	4–0
CFR Cluj (Romania)	4–3	(Bosnia and Herzegovina) Borac Banja Luka	3–1	1–2 (a.e.t.)
Shkëndija (North Macedonia)	0–6	(Slovenia) Mura	0–1	0–5
Teuta (Albania)	0–5	(Moldova) Sheriff Tiraspol	0–4	0–1
Dinamo Tbilisi (Georgia (country))	2–4	(Azerbaijan) Neftçi	1–2	1–2
Maccabi Haifa (Israel)	1–3	(Kazakhstan) Kairat	1–1	0–2
Ludogorets Razgrad (Bulgaria)	2–0	(Belarus) Shakhtyor Soligorsk	1–0	1–0
Ferencváros (Hungary)	6–1	(Kosovo) Prishtina	3–0	3–1
Žalgiris (Lithuania)	5–2	(Northern Ireland) Linfield	3–1	2–1
Flora (Estonia)	5–0	(Malta) Hibernians	2–0	3–0
Dinamo Zagreb (Croatia)	5–2	(Iceland) Valur	3–2	2–0

=== Matches ===
6 July 2021
19:30

Fola Esch (Luxembourg)	2–2	(Gibraltar) Lincoln Red Imps
Bensi 65'; Ahmetxheka 66'	Report	Carralero 26'; Britto 50'

Stade Émile Mayrisch, Esch-sur-Alzette
Attendance: 385
Referee: Michal Ocenáš (Slovakia)
13 July 2021
18:00

Lincoln Red Imps (Gibraltar)	5–0	(Luxembourg) Fola Esch
De Barr 19', 73'; Walker 39' (pen.), 68' (pen.); Ronan 58'	Report

Victoria Stadium, Gibraltar
Attendance: 621
Referee: Ian McNabb (Northern Ireland)

Lincoln Red Imps won 7–2 on aggregate.

7 July 2021
18:30

Slovan Bratislava (Slovakia)	2–0	(Republic of Ireland) Shamrock Rovers
Ratão 28', 47'	Report

Tehelné pole, Bratislava
Attendance: 500
Referee: Sebastian Gishamer (Austria)
13 July 2021
21:00 (20:00 UTC+1)

Shamrock Rovers (Republic of Ireland)	2–1	(Slovakia) Slovan Bratislava
Burke 16' (pen.); Towell 64'	Report	Weiss 73'

Tallaght Stadium, Tallaght
Attendance: 1,500
Referee: Mario Zebec (Croatia)

Slovan Bratislava won 3–2 on aggregate.

7 July 2021
19:00

Malmö FF (Sweden)	1–0	(Latvia) Riga
Čolak 50'	Report

Stadion, Malmö
Attendance: 4,012
Referee: Kaarlo Oskari Hämäläinen (Finland)
13 July 2021
18:00 (19:00 UTC+3)

Riga (Latvia)	1–1	(Sweden) Malmö FF
Paurević 57'	Report	Čolak 33'

Skonto Stadium, Riga
Attendance: 637
Referee: Gergő Bogár (Hungary)

Malmö FF won 2–1 on aggregate.

7 July 2021
18:00

Bodø/Glimt (Norway)	2–3	(Poland) Legia Warsaw
Botheim 45+1'; Pernambuco 78'	Report	Luquinhas 2'; Emreli 41', 61'

Aspmyra Stadion, Bodø
Attendance: 2,283
Referee: Juxhin Xhaja (Albania)
14 July 2021
20:00

Legia Warsaw (Poland)	2–0	(Norway) Bodø/Glimt
Luquinhas 40'; Pekhart 90+5'	Report

Stadion Wojska Polskiego, Warsaw
Attendance: 17,473
Referee: Aristotelis Diamantopoulos (Greece)

Legia Warsaw won 5–2 on aggregate.

7 July 2021
20:00 (19:00 UTC+1)

Connah's Quay Nomads (Wales)	2–2	(Armenia) Alashkert
Curran 19'; Horan 79'	Report	Khurtsidze 21', 45'

Park Avenue, Aberystwyth (Note: Connah's Quay Nomads played their home match at Park Avenue, Aberystwyth, instead of their regular stadium Deeside Stadium, Connah's Quay, which did not meet UEFA requirements.)
Attendance: 145
Referee: Vasilis Dimitriou (Cyprus)
14 July 2021
17:00 (19:00 UTC+4)

Alashkert (Armenia)	1–0 (a.e.t.)	(Wales) Connah's Quay Nomads
Bezecourt 113'	Report

Vazgen Sargsyan Republican Stadium, Yerevan (Note: Alashkert played their home matches at Vazgen Sargsyan Republican Stadium, Yerevan, instead of their regular stadium Alashkert Stadium, Yerevan, which did not meet UEFA requirements.)
Attendance: 4,000
Referee: Ondřej Pechanec (Czech Republic)

Alashkert won 3–2 on aggregate.

6 July 2021
18:00 (19:00 UTC+3)

HJK (Finland)	3–1	(Montenegro) Budućnost Podgorica
Ro. Riski 5'; Valenčič 7'; Saksela 13'	Report	Raičković 35' (pen.)

Bolt Arena, Helsinki
Attendance: 2,365
Referee: Nicolas Laforge (Belgium)
13 July 2021
20:30

Budućnost Podgorica (Montenegro)	0–4	(Finland) HJK
	Report	Ro. Riski 6', 49'; Valenčič 35'; Jair 40'

Stadion pod Goricom, Podgorica
Attendance: 1,450
Referee: Dragomir Draganov (Bulgaria)

HJK won 7–1 on aggregate.

6 July 2021
19:00 (20:00 UTC+3)

CFR Cluj (Romania)	3–1	(Bosnia and Herzegovina) Borac Banja Luka
Omrani 11'; Deac 28'; Sigurjónsson 60'	Report	Moraitis 45+1'

Dr. Constantin Rădulescu, Cluj-Napoca
Attendance: 4,500
Referee: Jochem Kamphuis (Netherlands)
13 July 2021
20:00

Borac Banja Luka (Bosnia and Herzegovina)	2–1 (a.e.t.)	(Romania) CFR Cluj
Vranješ 60'; Moraitis 64'	Report	Chipciu 118'

Banja Luka City Stadium, Banja Luka
Attendance: 8,300
Referee: Urs Schnyder (Switzerland)

CFR Cluj won 4–3 on aggregate.

6 July 2021
20:00

Shkëndija (North Macedonia)	0–1	(Slovenia) Mura
	Report	Bobičanec 28' (pen.)

Toše Proeski Arena, Skopje (Note: Shkëndija played their home match at Toše Proeski Arena, Skopje, instead of their regular stadium Ecolog Arena, Tetovo, which did not meet UEFA requirements.)
Attendance: 3,200
Referee: António Nobre (Portugal)
13 July 2021
20:00

Mura (Slovenia)	5–0	(North Macedonia) Shkëndija
Bobičanec 25'; Kouter 45+1'; Klepač 55', 87'; Kous 64'	Report

Fazanerija, Murska Sobota
Attendance: 3,100
Referee: Marcel Birsan (Romania)

Mura won 6–0 on aggregate.

7 July 2021
19:00

Teuta (Albania)	0–4	(Moldova) Sheriff Tiraspol
	Report	Luvannor 15', 45+1'; Traoré 56'; Castañeda 89'

Niko Dovana Stadium, Durrës
Attendance: 500
Referee: Amine Kourgheli (Belarus)
13 July 2021
19:00 (20:00 UTC+3)

Sheriff Tiraspol (Moldova)	1–0	(Albania) Teuta
Traoré 6'	Report

Malaya Sportivnaya Arena, Tiraspol
Attendance: 1,920
Referee: Vladimir Moskalyov (Russia)

Sheriff Tiraspol won 5–0 on aggregate.

7 July 2021
18:00 (20:00 UTC+4)

Dinamo Tbilisi (Georgia (country))	1–2	(Azerbaijan) Neftçi
Marušić 36'	Report	Alaskarov 23'; Mahmudov 57' (pen.)

Boris Paichadze Dinamo Arena, Tbilisi
Attendance: 5,890
Referee: David Fuxman (Israel)
14 July 2021
19:00 (21:00 UTC+4)

Neftçi (Azerbaijan)	2–1	(Georgia (country)) Dinamo Tbilisi
Mahmudov 58' (pen.); Alaskarov 68'	Report	Radin 51'

Bakcell Arena, Baku
Attendance: 3,218
Referee: Dumitri Muntean (Moldova)

Neftçi won 4–2 on aggregate.

7 July 2021
19:00 (20:00 UTC+3)

Maccabi Haifa (Israel)	1–1	(Kazakhstan) Kairat
Atzili 45'	Report	Alip 76'

Sammy Ofer Stadium, Haifa
Attendance: 25,200
Referee: Milovan Milačić (Montenegro)
14 July 2021
16:00 (20:00 UTC+6)

Kairat (Kazakhstan)	2–0	(Israel) Maccabi Haifa
Vágner Love 10'; Abiken 66'	Report

Almaty Central Stadium, Almaty
Attendance: 7,952
Referee: Viktor Kopiievskyi (Ukraine)

Kairat won 3–1 on aggregate.

7 July 2021
19:00 (20:00 UTC+3)

Ludogorets Razgrad (Bulgaria)	1–0	(Belarus) Shakhtyor Soligorsk
Cauly 90+2'	Report

Huvepharma Arena, Razgrad
Attendance: 4,762
Referee: Rohit Saggi (Norway)
13 July 2021
21:30

Shakhtyor Soligorsk (Belarus)	0–1	(Bulgaria) Ludogorets Razgrad
	Report	Despodov 71'

Čukarički Stadium, Belgrade, Serbia (Note: Shakhtyor Soligorsk played their home match at Čukarički Stadium, Belgrade, Serbia, instead of their regular stadium Stroitel Stadium, Soligorsk, as in June 2021 UEFA suspended most matches to be played in Belarus, due to European Union sanctions in response to the Ryanair Flight 4978 incident which banned European Union airlines from flying over Belarusian airspace.)
Attendance: 0
Referee: Arda Kardeşler (Turkey)

Ludogorets Razgrad won 2–0 on aggregate.

6 July 2021
18:00

Ferencváros (Hungary)	3–0	(Kosovo) Prishtina
Nguen 71'; R. Mmaee 74'; Blažič 78'	Report

Ferencváros Stadion, Budapest
Attendance: 8,765
Referee: David Munro (Scotland)
13 July 2021
20:00

Prishtina (Kosovo)	1–3	(Hungary) Ferencváros
Hoti 67'	Report	Uzuni 49', 80', 86'

Fadil Vokrri Stadium, Pristina
Attendance: 0
Referee: Laurent Kopriwa (Luxembourg)

Ferencváros won 6–1 on aggregate.

6 July 2021
19:00 (20:00 UTC+3)

Žalgiris (Lithuania)	3–1	(Northern Ireland) Linfield
Vidémont 38'; Kiš 45' (pen.); Sylvestr 67'	Report	Manzinga 54'

LFF Stadium, Vilnius
Attendance: 1,500
Referee: Alex Troleis (Faroe Islands)
13 July 2021
20:45 (19:45 UTC+1)

Linfield (Northern Ireland)	1–2	(Lithuania) Žalgiris
Shields 66' (pen.)	Report	Mikoliūnas 17'; Onazi 44'

Windsor Park, Belfast
Attendance: 888
Referee: Matthew De Gabriele (Malta)

Žalgiris won 5–2 on aggregate.

6 July 2021
18:00 (19:00 UTC+3)

Flora (Estonia)	2–0	(Malta) Hibernians
Sappinen 75', 89'	Report

Lilleküla Stadium, Tallinn
Attendance: 1,804
Referee: Lazar Lukić (Serbia)
13 July 2021
18:00

Hibernians (Malta)	0–3	(Estonia) Flora
	Report	Zenjov 25'; Sappinen 33'; Reinkort 87'

Centenary Stadium, Ta' Qali
Attendance: 155
Referee: Manfredas Lukjančukas (Lithuania)

Flora won 5–0 on aggregate.

7 July 2021
20:00

Dinamo Zagreb (Croatia)	3–2	(Iceland) Valur
Ademi 8', 72'; Majer 41' (pen.)	Report	K. Sigurðsson 88'; Adolphsson 90'

Stadion Maksimir, Zagreb
Attendance: 987
Referee: Genc Nuza (Kosovo)
13 July 2021
22:00 (20:00 UTC+0)

Valur (Iceland)	0–2	(Croatia) Dinamo Zagreb
	Report	Ivanušec 31'; Oršić 89'

Hlíðarendi, Reykjavík
Attendance: 800
Referee: Zaven Hovhannisyan (Armenia)

Dinamo Zagreb won 5–2 on aggregate.

== Second qualifying round ==
The draw for the second qualifying round was held on 16 June 2021, 12:00 CEST.

=== Seeding ===
A total of 26 teams played in the second qualifying round. They were divided into two paths:

- Champions Path (20 teams): 4 teams which entered in this round, and 16 winners of the first qualifying round.
- League Path (6 teams): 6 teams which entered in this round.

Seeding of teams was based on their 2021 UEFA club coefficients. For the winners of the first qualifying round, whose identity was not known at the time of draw, the club coefficient of the highest-ranked remaining team in each tie was used. Prior to the draw, UEFA formed three groups in the Champions Path, two of three seeded teams and three unseeded teams, and one of four seeded teams and four unseeded teams, in accordance with the principles set by the Club Competitions Committee, while in the League Path there were three seeded teams and three unseeded teams. The first team drawn in each tie would be the home team of the first leg.

Champions Path
Group 1		Group 2		Group 3	
Seeded	Unseeded	Seeded	Unseeded	Seeded	Unseeded
(Croatia) Dinamo Zagreb; (Switzerland) Young Boys; (Poland) Legia Warsaw	(Slovakia) Slovan Bratislava; (Estonia) Flora; (Cyprus) Omonia	(Greece) Olympiacos; (Serbia) Red Star Belgrade; (Moldova) Sheriff Tiraspol	(Armenia) Alashkert; (Azerbaijan) Neftçi; (Kazakhstan) Kairat	(Bulgaria) Ludogorets Razgrad; (Sweden) Malmö FF; (Romania) CFR Cluj; (Hungary) Ferencváros	(Slovenia) Mura; (Lithuania) Žalgiris; (Finland) HJK; (Gibraltar) Lincoln Red Imps

Notes

1. ^{†} Winner of the first qualifying round, whose identity was not known at the time of draw. Teams in italics defeated a team with a higher coefficient, thus effectively taking the coefficient of their opponent in the draw.

League Path
Seeded	Unseeded
(Scotland) Celtic; (Netherlands) PSV Eindhoven; (Czech Republic) Sparta Prague	(Austria) Rapid Wien; (Turkey) Galatasaray; (Denmark) Midtjylland

=== Summary ===
The first legs were played on 20 and 21 July, and the second legs were played on 27 and 28 July 2021.

The winners of the ties advanced to the third qualifying round of their respective path. The Champions Path losers were transferred to the Europa League Champions Path third qualifying round, while the League Path losers were transferred to the Europa League Main Path third qualifying round.

Team 1	Agg.	Team 2	1st leg	2nd leg
Champions Path
Dinamo Zagreb (Croatia)	3–0	(Cyprus) Omonia	2–0	1–0
Slovan Bratislava (Slovakia)	2–3	(Switzerland) Young Boys	0–0	2–3
Legia Warsaw (Poland)	3–1	(Estonia) Flora	2–1	1–0
Alashkert (Armenia)	1–4	(Moldova) Sheriff Tiraspol	0–1	1–3
Olympiacos (Greece)	2–0	(Azerbaijan) Neftçi	1–0	1–0
Kairat (Kazakhstan)	2–6	(Serbia) Red Star Belgrade	2–1	0–5
Lincoln Red Imps (Gibraltar)	1–4	(Romania) CFR Cluj	1–2	0–2
Malmö FF (Sweden)	4–3	(Finland) HJK	2–1	2–2
Ferencváros (Hungary)	5–1	(Lithuania) Žalgiris	2–0	3–1
Mura (Slovenia)	1–3	(Bulgaria) Ludogorets Razgrad	0–0	1–3
League Path
Rapid Wien (Austria)	2–3	(Czech Republic) Sparta Prague	2–1	0–2
Celtic (Scotland)	2–3	(Denmark) Midtjylland	1–1	1–2 (a.e.t.)
PSV Eindhoven (Netherlands)	7–2	(Turkey) Galatasaray	5–1	2–1

=== Champions Path matches ===
20 July 2021
20:00

Dinamo Zagreb (Croatia)	2–0	(Cyprus) Omonia
Majer 65'; Jakić 81'	Report

Stadion Maksimir, Zagreb
Attendance: 2,234
Referee: Paweł Gil (Poland)
27 July 2021
17:00 (18:00 UTC+3)

Omonia (Cyprus)	0–1	(Croatia) Dinamo Zagreb
	Report	Menalo 79'

GSP Stadium, Strovolos
Attendance: 7,256
Referee: Glenn Nyberg (Sweden)

Dinamo Zagreb won 3–0 on aggregate.

21 July 2021
20:30

Slovan Bratislava (Slovakia)	0–0	(Switzerland) Young Boys
	Report

Tehelné pole, Bratislava
Attendance: 1,000
Referee: Chris Kavanagh (England)
28 July 2021
20:15

Young Boys (Switzerland)	3–2	(Slovakia) Slovan Bratislava
Pefok 10' (pen.); Garcia 24'; Aebischer 49'	Report	Kanga 60' (o.g.); Henty 62'

Wankdorf Stadium, Bern
Attendance: 19,564
Referee: Irfan Peljto (Bosnia and Herzegovina)

Young Boys won 3–2 on aggregate.

21 July 2021
21:00

Legia Warsaw (Poland)	2–1	(Estonia) Flora
Kapustka 3'; Lopes 90+1'	Report	Sappinen 53'

Stadion Wojska Polskiego, Warsaw
Attendance: 16,721
Referee: Vitali Meshkov (Russia)
27 July 2021
18:00 (19:00 UTC+3)

Flora (Estonia)	0–1	(Poland) Legia Warsaw
	Report	Lopes 67'

Lilleküla Stadium, Tallinn
Attendance: 3,691
Referee: Anastasios Papapetrou (Greece)

Legia Warsaw won 3–1 on aggregate.

20 July 2021
17:00 (19:00 UTC+4)

Alashkert (Armenia)	0–1	(Moldova) Sheriff Tiraspol
	Report	Luvannor 84'

Vazgen Sargsyan Republican Stadium, Yerevan
Attendance: 5,800
Referee: Rade Obrenovič (Slovenia)
28 July 2021
19:00 (20:00 UTC+3)

Sheriff Tiraspol (Moldova)	3–1	(Armenia) Alashkert
Dulanto 15'; Luvannor 23'; Thill 87' (pen.)	Report	Glišić 10'

Malaya Sportivnaya Arena, Tiraspol
Attendance: 2,046
Referee: Bojan Pandžić (Sweden)

Sheriff Tiraspol won 4–1 on aggregate.

21 July 2021
21:00 (22:00 UTC+3)

Olympiacos (Greece)	1–0	(Azerbaijan) Neftçi
M. Camara 29'	Report

Karaiskakis Stadium, Piraeus
Attendance: 7,305
Referee: João Pinheiro (Portugal)
28 July 2021
19:00 (21:00 UTC+4)

Neftçi (Azerbaijan)	0–1	(Greece) Olympiacos
	Report	Gi. Masouras 15'

Eighth Kilometer District Stadium, Baku
Attendance: 5,500
Referee: Ricardo de Burgos (Spain)

Olympiacos won 2–0 on aggregate.

21 July 2021
16:00 (20:00 UTC+6)

Kairat (Kazakhstan)	2–1	(Serbia) Red Star Belgrade
Kanté 24'; Bagnack 79'	Report	Mikanović 57' (o.g.)

Almaty Central Stadium, Almaty
Attendance: 7,000
Referee: Halil Umut Meler (Turkey)
28 July 2021
20:30

Red Star Belgrade (Serbia)	5–0	(Kazakhstan) Kairat
Katai 9', 42'; Diony 21'; Ivanić 49'; Falco 56'	Report

Red Star Stadium, Belgrade
Attendance: 0
Referee: Andris Treimanis (Latvia)

Red Star Belgrade won 6–2 on aggregate.

20 July 2021
18:00

Lincoln Red Imps (Gibraltar)	1–2	(Romania) CFR Cluj
Rosa 45'	Report	Debeljuh 52', 58'

Victoria Stadium, Gibraltar
Attendance: 1,039
Referee: Willy Delajod (France)
28 July 2021
19:30 (20:30 UTC+3)

CFR Cluj (Romania)	2–0	(Gibraltar) Lincoln Red Imps
Cestor 18'; Sigurjónsson 58'	Report

Dr. Constantin Rădulescu, Cluj-Napoca
Attendance: 5,230
Referee: Yigal Frid (Israel)

CFR Cluj won 4–1 on aggregate.

21 July 2021
19:00

Malmö FF (Sweden)	2–1	(Finland) HJK
Čolak 45+1'; Christiansen 74'	Report	Ro. Riski 68'

Stadion, Malmö
Attendance: 5,324
Referee: Mykola Balakin (Ukraine)
27 July 2021
18:00 (19:00 UTC+3)

HJK (Finland)	2–2	(Sweden) Malmö FF
Tenho 1'; Ri. Riski 78'	Report	Christiansen 10'; Birmančević 76'

Bolt Arena, Helsinki
Attendance: 6,465
Referee: Stuart Attwell (England)

Malmö FF won 4–3 on aggregate.

20 July 2021
20:00

Ferencváros (Hungary)	2–0	(Lithuania) Žalgiris
Uzuni 25'; Nguen 39'	Report

Ferencváros Stadion, Budapest
Attendance: 10,107
Referee: Giorgi Kruashvili (Georgia)
27 July 2021
19:00 (20:00 UTC+3)

Žalgiris (Lithuania)	1–3	(Hungary) Ferencváros
Diaw 90+3'	Report	R. Mmaee 44', 72'; Mak 90+4'

LFF Stadium, Vilnius
Attendance: 2,032
Referee: Erik Lambrechts (Belgium)

Ferencváros won 5–1 on aggregate.

21 July 2021
20:00

Mura (Slovenia)	0–0	(Bulgaria) Ludogorets Razgrad
	Report

Fazanerija, Murska Sobota
Attendance: 3,450
Referee: Harm Osmers (Germany)
28 July 2021
20:00 (21:00 UTC+3)

Ludogorets Razgrad (Bulgaria)	3–1	(Slovenia) Mura
Sotiriou 4'; Manu 82'; Cauly 90'	Report	Horvat 64'

Huvepharma Arena, Razgrad
Attendance: 5,008
Referee: Marco Di Bello (Italy)

Ludogorets Razgrad won 3–1 on aggregate.

=== League Path matches ===
20 July 2021
20:30

Rapid Wien (Austria)	2–1	(Czech Republic) Sparta Prague
Knasmüllner 63', 71'	Report	Krejčí II 3'

Allianz Stadion, Vienna
Attendance: 19,500
Referee: Serdar Gözübüyük (Netherlands)
28 July 2021
20:30

Sparta Prague (Czech Republic)	2–0	(Austria) Rapid Wien
Karlsson 16' (pen.); Pešek 81'	Report

Stadion Letná, Prague
Attendance: 9,105
Referee: Bobby Madden (Scotland)

Sparta Prague won 3–2 on aggregate.

20 July 2021
20:45 (19:45 UTC+1)

Celtic (Scotland)	1–1	(Denmark) Midtjylland
Abada 39'	Report	Evander 66'

Celtic Park, Glasgow
Attendance: 9,000
Referee: Sandro Schärer (Switzerland)
28 July 2021
19:45

Midtjylland (Denmark)	2–1 (a.e.t.)	(Scotland) Celtic
Mabil 61'; Onyedika 94'	Report	McGregor 48'

MCH Arena, Herning
Attendance: 4,890
Referee: Bartosz Frankowski (Poland)

Midtjylland won 3–2 on aggregate.

21 July 2021
21:00

PSV Eindhoven (Netherlands)	5–1	(Turkey) Galatasaray
Zahavi 2', 35', 84'; Götze 51', 88'	Report	Kılınç 42'

Philips Stadion, Eindhoven
Attendance: 23,500
Referee: Alejandro Hernández (Spain)
28 July 2021
20:00 (21:00 UTC+3)

Galatasaray (Turkey)	1–2	(Netherlands) PSV Eindhoven
Diagne 84'	Report	Madueke 37'; Van Ginkel 59'

Başakşehir Fatih Terim Stadium, Istanbul (Note: Galatasaray played their home match at Başakşehir Fatih Terim Stadium in Istanbul, instead of their regular stadium Türk Telekom Stadium, also in Istanbul.)
Attendance: 5,775
Referee: Massimiliano Irrati (Italy)

PSV Eindhoven won 7–2 on aggregate.

== Third qualifying round ==
The draw for the third qualifying round was held on 19 July 2021, 12:00 CEST.

=== Seeding ===
A total of 20 teams played in the third qualifying round. They were divided into two paths:

- Champions Path (12 teams): 2 teams which entered in this round, and 10 winners of the second qualifying round (Champions Path).
- League Path (8 teams): 5 teams which entered in this round, and 3 winners of the second qualifying round (League Path).

Seeding of teams was based on their 2021 UEFA club coefficients. For the winners of the second qualifying round, whose identity was not known at the time of draw, the club coefficient of the highest-ranked remaining team in each tie was used. Prior to the draw, UEFA formed two groups in the Champions Path, of three seeded teams and three unseeded teams, in accordance with the principles set by the Club Competitions Committee, while in the League Path there were four seeded teams and four unseeded teams. Due to political reasons, teams from Ukraine and Russia in the League Path could not be drawn against each other, thus Shakhtar Donetsk and Spartak Moscow could not be drawn against each other. The first team drawn in each tie would be the home team of the first leg.

Champions Path
Group 1		Group 2	
Seeded	Unseeded	Seeded	Unseeded
(Croatia) Dinamo Zagreb; (Greece) Olympiacos; (Switzerland) Young Boys	(Bulgaria) Ludogorets Razgrad; (Romania) CFR Cluj; (Poland) Legia Warsaw	(Czech Republic) Slavia Prague; (Serbia) Red Star Belgrade; (Scotland) Rangers	(Sweden) Malmö FF; (Moldova) Sheriff Tiraspol; (Hungary) Ferencváros

League Path
Seeded	Unseeded
(Ukraine) Shakhtar Donetsk; (Portugal) Benfica; (France) Monaco; (Denmark) Midtjylland	(Belgium) Genk; (Netherlands) PSV Eindhoven; (Russia) Spartak Moscow; (Czech Republic) Sparta Prague

Notes

1. ^{†} Winner of the second qualifying round, whose identity was not known at the time of draw. Teams in italics defeated a team with a higher coefficient, thus effectively taking the coefficient of their opponent in the draw.

=== Summary ===
The first legs were played on 3 and 4 August, and the second legs were played on 10 August 2021.

The winners of the ties advanced to the play-off round of their respective path. The Champions Path losers were transferred to the Europa League play-off round, while the League Path losers were transferred to the Europa League group stage.

Team 1	Agg.	Team 2	1st leg	2nd leg
Champions Path
Dinamo Zagreb (Croatia)	2–1	(Poland) Legia Warsaw	1–1	1–0
CFR Cluj (Romania)	2–4	(Switzerland) Young Boys	1–1	1–3
Olympiacos (Greece)	3–3 (1–4 p)	(Bulgaria) Ludogorets Razgrad	1–1	2–2 (a.e.t.)
Red Star Belgrade (Serbia)	1–2	(Moldova) Sheriff Tiraspol	1–1	0–1
Malmö FF (Sweden)	4–2	(Scotland) Rangers	2–1	2–1
Ferencváros (Hungary)	2–1	(Czech Republic) Slavia Prague	2–0	0–1
League Path
PSV Eindhoven (Netherlands)	4–0	(Denmark) Midtjylland	3–0	1–0
Spartak Moscow (Russia)	0–4	(Portugal) Benfica	0–2	0–2
Genk (Belgium)	2–4	(Ukraine) Shakhtar Donetsk	1–2	1–2
Sparta Prague (Czech Republic)	1–5	(France) Monaco	0–2	1–3

=== Champions Path matches ===
4 August 2021
20:00

Dinamo Zagreb (Croatia)	1–1	(Poland) Legia Warsaw
Petković 60'	Report	Muçi 82'

Stadion Maksimir, Zagreb
Attendance: 4,597
Referee: Antonio Mateu Lahoz (Spain)
10 August 2021
21:00

Legia Warsaw (Poland)	0–1	(Croatia) Dinamo Zagreb
	Report	Franjić 20'

Stadion Wojska Polskiego, Warsaw
Attendance: 26,769
Referee: Benoît Bastien (France)

Dinamo Zagreb won 2–1 on aggregate.

3 August 2021
20:00 (21:00 UTC+3)

CFR Cluj (Romania)	1–1	(Switzerland) Young Boys
Manea 4'	Report	Sierro 90+3'

Dr. Constantin Rădulescu, Cluj-Napoca
Attendance: 9,500
Referee: Danny Makkelie (Netherlands)
10 August 2021
20:30

Young Boys (Switzerland)	3–1	(Romania) CFR Cluj
Pefok 23', 42'; Ngamaleu 25'	Report	Omrani 4'

Wankdorf Stadium, Bern
Attendance: 21,145
Referee: Cüneyt Çakır (Turkey)

Young Boys won 4–2 on aggregate.

3 August 2021
21:00 (22:00 UTC+3)

Olympiacos (Greece)	1–1	(Bulgaria) Ludogorets Razgrad
A. Camara 87'	Report	Despodov 50'

Karaiskakis Stadium, Piraeus
Attendance: 9,212
Referee: Bobby Madden (Scotland)
10 August 2021
20:00 (21:00 UTC+3)

Ludogorets Razgrad (Bulgaria)	2–2 (a.e.t.)	(Greece) Olympiacos
Semedo 49' (o.g.); Sotiriou 57' (pen.)	Report	M'Vila 31'; El-Arabi 68' (pen.)
Penalties
Sotiriou (penalty scored); Santana (penalty scored); Verdon (penalty scored); Cicinho (penalty scored)	4–1	(penalty missed) Valbuena; (penalty missed) Hassan; (penalty scored) Lala

Huvepharma Arena, Razgrad
Attendance: 5,118
Referee: Orel Grinfeld (Israel)

3–3 on aggregate; Ludogorets Razgrad won 4–1 on penalties.

3 August 2021
21:00

Red Star Belgrade (Serbia)	1–1	(Moldova) Sheriff Tiraspol
Diony 45+1'	Report	Castañeda 33'

Red Star Stadium, Belgrade
Attendance: 24,433
Referee: Ovidiu Haţegan (Romania)
10 August 2021
19:00 (20:00 UTC+3)

Sheriff Tiraspol (Moldova)	1–0	(Serbia) Red Star Belgrade
Arboleda 45+2'	Report

Sheriff Stadium, Tiraspol
Attendance: 4,950
Referee: Felix Zwayer (Germany)

Sheriff Tiraspol won 2–1 on aggregate.

3 August 2021
19:00

Malmö FF (Sweden)	2–1	(Scotland) Rangers
Rieks 47'; Birmančević 49'	Report	Davis 90+5'

Stadion, Malmö
Attendance: 5,820
Referee: Szymon Marciniak (Poland)
10 August 2021
21:00 (20:00 UTC+1)

Rangers (Scotland)	1–2	(Sweden) Malmö FF
Morelos 19'	Report	Čolak 53', 58'

Ibrox Stadium, Glasgow
Attendance: 47,021
Referee: Slavko Vinčić (Slovenia)

Malmö FF won 4–2 on aggregate.

4 August 2021
20:00

Ferencváros (Hungary)	2–0	(Czech Republic) Slavia Prague
Kacharaba 44' (o.g.); Kharatin 50' (pen.)	Report

Ferencváros Stadion, Budapest
Attendance: 17,127
Referee: Jesús Gil Manzano (Spain)
10 August 2021
19:00

Slavia Prague (Czech Republic)	1–0	(Hungary) Ferencváros
Masopust 36'	Report

Sinobo Stadium, Prague
Attendance: 15,238
Referee: Tobias Stieler (Germany)

Ferencváros won 2–1 on aggregate.

=== League Path matches ===
3 August 2021
20:00

PSV Eindhoven (Netherlands)	3–0	(Denmark) Midtjylland
Madueke 19'; Götze 29'; Gakpo 32'	Report

Philips Stadion, Eindhoven
Attendance: 22,700
Referee: Sergei Karasev (Russia)
10 August 2021
20:00

Midtjylland (Denmark)	0–1	(Netherlands) PSV Eindhoven
	Report	Bruma 90+3'

MCH Arena, Herning
Attendance: 6,288
Referee: Clément Turpin (France)

PSV Eindhoven won 4–0 on aggregate.

4 August 2021
19:00 (20:00 UTC+3)

Spartak Moscow (Russia)	0–2	(Portugal) Benfica
	Report	Silva 51'; Gilberto 74'

Otkritie Arena, Moscow
Attendance: 2,933
Referee: Srđan Jovanović (Serbia)
10 August 2021
21:00 (20:00 UTC+1)

Benfica (Portugal)	2–0	(Russia) Spartak Moscow
Mário 58'; Gigot 90+2' (o.g.)	Report

Estádio da Luz, Lisbon
Attendance: 16,312
Referee: Anthony Taylor (England)

Benfica won 4–0 on aggregate.

3 August 2021
20:00

Genk (Belgium)	1–2	(Ukraine) Shakhtar Donetsk
Onuachu 39'	Report	Tetê 63' (pen.); Alan Patrick 81'

Luminus Arena, Genk
Attendance: 5,096
Referee: Anastasios Sidiropoulos (Greece)
10 August 2021
19:30 (20:30 UTC+3)

Shakhtar Donetsk (Ukraine)	2–1	(Belgium) Genk
Traoré 27'; Antônio 76'	Report	Dessers 90'

NSC Olimpiyskiy, Kyiv (Note: Shakhtar Donetsk played their third qualifying round home match at NSC Olimpiyskiy, Kyiv, instead of their regular stadium, the Donbas Arena in Donetsk, due to the war in Donbas.)
Attendance: 20,594
Referee: István Kovács (Romania)

Shakhtar Donetsk won 4–2 on aggregate.

3 August 2021
19:00

Sparta Prague (Czech Republic)	0–2	(France) Monaco
	Report	Tchouaméni 37'; Volland 59'

Stadion Letná, Prague
Attendance: 10,533
Referee: Michael Oliver (England)
10 August 2021
20:00

Monaco (France)	3–1	(Czech Republic) Sparta Prague
Martins 50'; Golovin 56'; Diop 81'	Report	Karlsson 78'

Stade Louis II, Monaco
Attendance: 5,476
Referee: Daniele Orsato (Italy)

Monaco won 5–1 on aggregate.

== Play-off round ==
The draw for the play-off round was held on 2 August 2021, 12:00 CEST.

=== Seeding ===
A total of 12 teams played in the play-off round. They were divided into two paths:

- Champions Path (8 teams): 2 teams which entered in this round, and 6 winners of the third qualifying round (Champions Path).
- League Path (4 teams): 4 winners of the third qualifying round (League Path).

Seeding of teams was based on their 2021 UEFA club coefficients. For the winners of the third qualifying round, whose identity was not known at the time of draw, the club coefficient of the highest-ranked remaining team in each tie was used. In the Champions Path there were four seeded teams and four unseeded teams, and in the League Path there were two seeded teams and two unseeded teams. The first team drawn in each tie would be the home team of the first leg.

Champions Path
Seeded	Unseeded
(Austria) Red Bull Salzburg; (Croatia) Dinamo Zagreb; (Hungary) Ferencváros; (Bulgaria) Ludogorets Razgrad	(Switzerland) Young Boys; (Moldova) Sheriff Tiraspol; (Sweden) Malmö FF; (Denmark) Brøndby

League Path
Seeded	Unseeded
(Ukraine) Shakhtar Donetsk; (Portugal) Benfica	(France) Monaco; (Netherlands) PSV Eindhoven

Notes

1. ^{†} Winners of the third qualifying round, whose identity was not known at the time of draw. Teams in italics defeated a team with a higher coefficient, thus effectively taking the coefficient of their opponent in the draw.

=== Summary ===
The first legs were played on 17 and 18 August, and the second legs were played on 24 and 25 August 2021.

The winners of the ties advanced to the group stage. The losers were transferred to the Europa League group stage.

Team 1	Agg.	Team 2	1st leg	2nd leg
Champions Path
Red Bull Salzburg (Austria)	4–2	(Denmark) Brøndby	2–1	2–1
Young Boys (Switzerland)	6–4	(Hungary) Ferencváros	3–2	3–2
Malmö FF (Sweden)	3–2	(Bulgaria) Ludogorets Razgrad	2–0	1–2
Sheriff Tiraspol (Moldova)	3–0	(Croatia) Dinamo Zagreb	3–0	0–0
League Path
Monaco (France)	2–3	(Ukraine) Shakhtar Donetsk	0–1	2–2 (a.e.t.)
Benfica (Portugal)	2–1	(Netherlands) PSV Eindhoven	2–1	0–0

=== Champions Path matches ===
17 August 2021
21:00

Red Bull Salzburg (Austria)	2–1	(Denmark) Brøndby
Adeyemi 56'; Aaronson 90'	Report	Uhre 4'

Stadion Wals-Siezenheim, Wals-Siezenheim
Attendance: 17,538
Referee: Szymon Marciniak (Poland)
25 August 2021
21:00

Brøndby (Denmark)	1–2	(Austria) Red Bull Salzburg
Maxsø 62'	Report	Šeško 4'; Aaronson 10'

Brøndby Stadium, Brøndbyvester
Attendance: 22,397
Referee: Carlos del Cerro Grande (Spain)

Red Bull Salzburg won 4–2 on aggregate.

18 August 2021
21:00

Young Boys (Switzerland)	3–2	(Hungary) Ferencváros
Elia 16'; Sierro 40'; Garcia 65'	Report	Boli 14', 82'

Wankdorf Stadium, Bern
Attendance: 15,652
Referee: Willie Collum (Scotland)
24 August 2021
21:00

Ferencváros (Hungary)	2–3	(Switzerland) Young Boys
Wingo 18'; R. Mmaee 27'	Report	Zesiger 4'; Fassnacht 56'; Mambimbi 90+3'

Ferencváros Stadion, Budapest
Attendance: 20,667
Referee: Sergei Karasev (Russia)

Young Boys won 6–4 on aggregate.

18 August 2021
21:00

Malmö FF (Sweden)	2–0	(Bulgaria) Ludogorets Razgrad
Birmančević 26'; Berget 61'	Report

Stadion, Malmö
Attendance: 5,463
Referee: Antonio Mateu Lahoz (Spain)
24 August 2021
21:00 (22:00 UTC+3)

Ludogorets Razgrad (Bulgaria)	2–1	(Sweden) Malmö FF
Nedyalkov 10'; Sotiriou 60' (pen.)	Report	Birmančević 42'

Huvepharma Arena, Razgrad
Attendance: 5,130
Referee: Clément Turpin (France)

Malmö FF won 3–2 on aggregate.

17 August 2021
21:00 (22:00 UTC+3)

Sheriff Tiraspol (Moldova)	3–0	(Croatia) Dinamo Zagreb
Traoré 45', 80'; Kolovos 54'	Report

Sheriff Stadium, Tiraspol
Attendance: 5,281
Referee: Cüneyt Çakır (Turkey)
25 August 2021
21:00

Dinamo Zagreb (Croatia)	0–0	(Moldova) Sheriff Tiraspol
	Report

Stadion Maksimir, Zagreb
Attendance: 8,015
Referee: Daniele Orsato (Italy)

Sheriff Tiraspol won 3–0 on aggregate.

=== League Path matches ===
17 August 2021
21:00

Monaco (France)	0–1	(Ukraine) Shakhtar Donetsk
	Report	Pedrinho 19'

Stade Louis II, Monaco
Attendance: 5,700
Referee: Danny Makkelie (Netherlands)
25 August 2021
21:00 (22:00 UTC+3)

Shakhtar Donetsk (Ukraine)	2–2 (a.e.t.)	(France) Monaco
Marlos 74'; Aguilar 114' (o.g.)	Report	Ben Yedder 18', 39'

Metalist OSC, Kharkiv (Note: Shakhtar Donetsk played their play-off round home match at Metalist OSC, Kharkiv, instead of their regular stadium, the Donbas Arena in Donetsk, due to the war in Donbas.)
Attendance: 26,697
Referee: Anthony Taylor (England)

Shakhtar Donetsk won 3–2 on aggregate.

18 August 2021
21:00 (20:00 UTC+1)

Benfica (Portugal)	2–1	(Netherlands) PSV Eindhoven
Silva 10'; Weigl 42'	Report	Gakpo 51'

Estádio da Luz, Lisbon
Attendance: 18,199
Referee: Felix Brych (Germany)
24 August 2021
21:00

PSV Eindhoven (Netherlands)	0–0	(Portugal) Benfica
	Report

Philips Stadion, Eindhoven
Attendance: 21,855
Referee: Slavko Vinčić (Slovenia)

Benfica won 2–1 on aggregate.
