= Ymer Shaba =

Albanian footballer

Personal information
- Date of birth: 21 July 1998 (age 28)
- Place of birth: Tirana, Albania
- Height: 1.87 m (6 ft 2 in)
- Position: Centre back

Youth career
- 2011–2016: Dinamo Tirana

Senior career*
Years	Team	Apps	(Gls)
2016–2019	Dinamo Tirana	61	(0)
2019–2020	Pembroke Athleta	9	(0)
2020–2021	Asteras Vlachioti		
2021	Korabi	3	(0)
Total		73	(0)

International career
2016	Albania U19	5	(0)
2018	Albania U20	1	(0)
2018	Albania U21	1	(0)
- * Club domestic league appearances and goals

Ymer Shaba (born 21 July 1998) is an Albanian former professional footballer who plays as a centre back.

== Club career ==
=== Early career ===
Shaba started his youth career at age of 13 at FK Dinamo Tirana academy in September 2011. He spent the 2011–12 season with under-15 side. Then he played with the under-17 side for two consecutive seasons, 2012–13 & 2013–14. From 2014 until January 2016 he was part of the under-19 side where during the first half of the 2015–16 season he played 12 matches and scored 1 goal.

=== Dinamo Tirana ===
In January 2016 he moved to the first team of FK Dinamo Tirana in the Albanian First Division. He made it his professional debut on 12 March 2016 against Turbina Cerrik playing the full 90-minutes match finished in the 1–1 draw.

=== Pembroke ===
In summer 2019, Shaba moved abroad to play for Maltese second-tier side Pembroke Athleta.

== International career ==
Shaba was called up at Albania national under-19 football team by coach Arjan Bellaj to participate in the Roma Caput Mundi Tournament from 29 February-4 March 2016.

Shaba received his first call up at the Albania national under-21 football team by coach Alban Bushi for a gathering in Durrës, Albania from 18 to 25 January 2017.

He received his first call up for the Albania under-20 side by coach Alban Bushi for the double friendly match against Azerbaijan U-21 on 21 & 26 January 2018.

== Career statistics ==
=== Club ===
As of 16 December 2017

Club statistics
Club	Season	League			Cup		Europe (Note: Including continental competitions, such as UEFA Champions League and UEFA Europa League)		Other (Note: Including other competitions, such as Albanian Supercup)		Total	
Club	Season	Division	Apps	Goals	Apps	Goals	Apps	Goals	Apps	Goals	Apps	Goals
Dinamo Tirana	2015–16	Albanian First Division	2	0	—		—		—		2	0
Dinamo Tirana	2016–17	Albanian First Division	17	0	3	0	—		—		20	0
Dinamo Tirana	2017–18	Albanian First Division	5	0	1	0	—		—		6	0
Dinamo Tirana	Total		24	0	4	0	—		—		28	0
Career total			24	0	4	0	—		—		28	0
