= 2021–22 UEFA Champions League =

European football tournament

- The Stade de France in Saint-Denis hosted the final

Tournament details
- Dates: Qualifying: 22 June – 25 August 2021; Competition proper: 14 September 2021 – 28 May 2022
- Teams: Competition proper: 32; Total: 80 (from 54 associations)

Final positions
- Champions: (Spain) Real Madrid (14th title)
- Runners-up: (England) Liverpool

Tournament statistics
- Matches played: 125
- Goals scored: 380 (3.04 per match)
- Attendance: 4,402,255 (35,218 per match)
- Top scorer(s): Karim Benzema (Real Madrid); 15 goals
- Best player: Karim Benzema (Real Madrid)
- Best young player: Vinícius Júnior (Real Madrid)

The 2021–22 UEFA Champions League was the 67th season of Europe's premier club football tournament organised by UEFA, and the 30th season since it was renamed from the European Champion Clubs' Cup to the UEFA Champions League.

Real Madrid defeated Liverpool 1–0 in the final, which was played at the Stade de France in Saint-Denis, France, for a record-extending 14th European Cup title, and their fifth in nine years. It was originally scheduled to be played at the Allianz Arena in Munich, Germany. However, due to the postponement and relocation of the 2020 final, the hosts were shifted back a year, with Saint Petersburg, Russia scheduled to host the 2022 final. The final was eventually moved to Saint-Denis, due to the war in Ukraine. As the winners, Real Madrid automatically qualified for the 2022–23 UEFA Champions League group stage, as well as earning the right to play against the winners of the 2021–22 UEFA Europa League, Eintracht Frankfurt, in the 2022 UEFA Super Cup and participate in the 2022 FIFA Club World Cup, both of which they went on to win.

Chelsea were the defending champions, but they were eliminated in the quarter-finals by eventual winners Real Madrid.

This season was the first since 1999–2000 (the first season after the dissolution of the UEFA Cup Winners' Cup) where three major European club competitions (UEFA Champions League, UEFA Europa League, and the newly created UEFA Europa Conference League) are organised by UEFA. No changes were made to the format of the Champions League, but teams that were eliminated from the preliminary round and first qualifying round of the Champions League were now transferred to the Europa Conference League instead of the Europa League.

On 24 June 2021, UEFA approved the proposal to abolish the away goals rule in all UEFA club competitions, which had been used since 1965. Accordingly, if in a two-legged tie two teams scored the same number of aggregate goals, the winner of the tie would not be decided by the number of away goals scored by each team but always by 30 minutes of extra time, and if the two teams scored the same number of goals in extra time, the winner would be decided by a penalty shoot-out.

== Association team allocation ==
A total of 80 teams from 54 of the 55 UEFA member associations participated in the 2021–22 UEFA Champions League (the exception being Liechtenstein, which did not organise a domestic league). The association ranking based on the UEFA association coefficients was used to determine the number of participating teams for each association:

- Associations 1–4 each had four teams qualify.
- Associations 5–6 each had three teams qualify.
- Associations 7–15 each had two teams qualify.
- Associations 16–55 (except Liechtenstein) each had one team qualify.
- The winners of the 2020–21 UEFA Champions League and 2020–21 UEFA Europa League were each given an additional entry if they did not qualify for the 2021–22 UEFA Champions League through their own domestic league. (As Chelsea, the Champions League title holders, did qualify through their own domestic league this season, the additional entry for the Champions League title holders was re-allocated.)

=== Association ranking ===
For the 2021–22 UEFA Champions League, the associations were allocated places according to their 2020 UEFA association coefficients, which took into account their performance in European competitions from 2015–16 to 2019–20.

Apart from the allocation based on the association coefficients, associations could have additional teams participating in the Champions League, as noted below:

- (UEL) – Additional berth for UEFA Europa League title holders

Association ranking for 2021–22 UEFA Champions League

Rank	Association	Coeff.	Teams	Notes
1	Spain	102.283	4	+1 (UEL)
2	England	90.462	4	
3	Germany	74.784	4	
4	Italy	70.653	4	
5	France	59.248	3	
6	Portugal	49.449	3	
7	Russia	45.549	2	
8	Belgium	37.900	2	
9	Ukraine	36.100	2	
10	Netherlands	35.750	2	
11	Turkey	33.600	2	
12	Austria	32.925	2	
13	Denmark	29.250	2	
14	Scotland	27.875	2	
15	Czech Republic	27.300	2	
16	Cyprus	26.750	1	
17	Switzerland	26.400	1	
18	Greece	26.300	1	
19	Serbia	25.500	1	

Rank	Association	Coeff.	Teams	Notes
20	Croatia	24.875	1	
21	Sweden	22.750	1	
22	Norway	21.750	1	
23	Israel	19.625	1	
24	Kazakhstan	19.250	1	
25	Belarus	18.875	1	
26	Azerbaijan	18.750	1	
27	Bulgaria	17.375	1	
28	Romania	16.700	1	
29	Poland	16.625	1	
30	Slovakia	15.875	1	
31	Liechtenstein	13.500	0	
32	Slovenia	13.000	1	
33	Hungary	12.875	1	
34	Luxembourg	8.000	1	
35	Lithuania	7.875	1	
36	Armenia	7.625	1	
37	Latvia	7.625	1	

Rank	Association	Coeff.	Teams	Notes
38	Albania	7.375	1	
39	North Macedonia	7.375	1	
40	Bosnia and Herzegovina	6.875	1	
41	Moldova	6.750	1	
42	Republic of Ireland	6.700	1	
43	Finland	6.500	1	
44	Georgia	5.750	1	
45	Malta	5.750	1	
46	Iceland	5.375	1	
47	Wales	5.000	1	
48	Northern Ireland	4.875	1	
49	Gibraltar	4.750	1	
50	Montenegro	4.375	1	
51	Estonia	4.375	1	
52	Kosovo	4.000	1	
53	Faroe Islands	3.750	1	
54	Andorra	2.831	1	
55	San Marino	0.666	1	

=== Distribution ===
The following is the access list for this season. As the Champions League title holders, Chelsea, which were guaranteed a berth in the Champions League group stage, already qualified via their domestic league (as fourth place in the 2020-21 Premier League), the following changes to the access list were made:

- The champions of association 11 (Turkey) enter the group stage instead of the play-off round (Champions Path).
- The champions of association 13 (Denmark) enter the play-off round instead of the third qualifying round (Champions Path).
- The champions of association 15 (Czech Republic) enter the third qualifying round instead of the second qualifying round (Champions Path).
- The champions of associations 18 (Greece) and 19 (Serbia) enter the second qualifying round instead of the first qualifying round (Champions Path).

Access list for 2021–22 UEFA Champions League
		Teams entering in this round	Teams advancing from previous round
Preliminary round (4 teams)		4 champions from associations 52–55	
First qualifying round (32 teams)		31 champions from associations 20–51 (except Liechtenstein)	1 winner from the preliminary round
Second qualifying round (26 teams)	Champions Path (20 teams)	4 champions from associations 16–19	16 winners from the first qualifying round
Second qualifying round (26 teams)	League Path (6 teams)	6 runners-up from associations 10–15	
Third qualifying round (20 teams)	Champions Path (12 teams)	2 champions from associations 14–15	10 winners from the second qualifying round (Champions Path)
Third qualifying round (20 teams)	League Path (8 teams)	3 runners-up from associations 7–9; 2 third-placed teams from associations 5–6	3 winners from the second qualifying round (League Path)
Play-off round (12 teams)	Champions Path (8 teams)	2 champions from associations 12–13	6 winners from the third qualifying round (Champions Path)
Play-off round (12 teams)	League Path (4 teams)		4 winners from the third qualifying round (League Path)
Group stage (32 teams)		Europa League title holders; 11 champions from associations 1–11; 6 runners-up from associations 1–6; 4 third-placed teams from associations 1–4; 4 fourth-placed teams from associations 1–4	4 winners from the play-off round (Champions Path); 2 winners from the play-off round (League Path)
Knockout phase (16 teams)			8 group winners from the group stage; 8 group runners-up from the group stage

=== Teams ===
The labels in the parentheses show how each team qualified for the place of its starting round:

- TH: Champions League title holders
- EL: Europa League title holders
- 1st, 2nd, 3rd, 4th, etc.: League positions of the previous season
- Abd-: League positions of abandoned season due to the COVID-19 pandemic in Europe as determined by the national association; all teams were subject to approval by UEFA as per the guidelines for entry to European competitions in response to the COVID-19 pandemic.

The second qualifying round, third qualifying round and play-off round were divided into Champions Path (CH) and League Path (LP).

Qualified teams for 2021–22 UEFA Champions League
Entry round		Teams			
Group stage		(England) Chelsea (4th)^{TH}	(Spain) Villarreal (EL)	(Spain) Atlético Madrid (1st)	(Spain) Real Madrid (2nd)
Group stage		(Spain) Barcelona (3rd)	(Spain) Sevilla (4th)	(England) Manchester City (1st)	(England) Manchester United (2nd)
Group stage		(England) Liverpool (3rd)	(Germany) Bayern Munich (1st)	(Germany) RB Leipzig (2nd)	(Germany) Borussia Dortmund (3rd)
Group stage		(Germany) VfL Wolfsburg (4th)	(Italy) Inter Milan (1st)	(Italy) Milan (2nd)	(Italy) Atalanta (3rd)
Group stage		(Italy) Juventus (4th)	(France) Lille (1st)	(France) Paris Saint-Germain (2nd)	(Portugal) Sporting CP (1st)
Group stage		(Portugal) Porto (2nd)	(Russia) Zenit Saint Petersburg (1st)	(Belgium) Club Brugge (1st)	(Ukraine) Dynamo Kyiv (1st)
Group stage		(Netherlands) Ajax (1st)	(Turkey) Beşiktaş (1st)		
Play-off round	CH	(Austria) Red Bull Salzburg (1st)	(Denmark) Brøndby (1st)		
Third qualifying round	CH	(Scotland) Rangers (1st)	(Czech Republic) Slavia Prague (1st)		
Third qualifying round	LP	(France) Monaco (3rd)	(Portugal) Benfica (3rd)	(Russia) Spartak Moscow (2nd)	(Belgium) Genk (2nd)
Third qualifying round	LP	(Ukraine) Shakhtar Donetsk (2nd)			
Second qualifying round	CH	(Cyprus) Omonia (1st)	(Switzerland) Young Boys (1st)	(Greece) Olympiacos (1st)	(Serbia) Red Star Belgrade (1st)
Second qualifying round	LP	(Netherlands) PSV Eindhoven (2nd)	(Turkey) Galatasaray (2nd)	(Austria) Rapid Wien (2nd)	(Denmark) Midtjylland (2nd)
Second qualifying round	LP	(Scotland) Celtic (2nd)	(Czech Republic) Sparta Prague (2nd)		
First qualifying round		(Croatia) Dinamo Zagreb (1st)	(Sweden) Malmö FF (1st)	(Norway) Bodø/Glimt (1st)	(Israel) Maccabi Haifa (1st)
First qualifying round		(Kazakhstan) Kairat (1st)	(Belarus) Shakhtyor Soligorsk (1st)	(Azerbaijan) Neftçi (1st)	(Bulgaria) Ludogorets Razgrad (1st)
First qualifying round		(Romania) CFR Cluj (1st)	(Poland) Legia Warsaw (1st)	(Slovakia) Slovan Bratislava (1st)	(Slovenia) Mura (1st)
First qualifying round		(Hungary) Ferencváros (1st)	(Luxembourg) Fola Esch (1st)	(Lithuania) Žalgiris (1st)	(Armenia) Alashkert (1st)
First qualifying round		(Latvia) Riga (1st)	(Albania) Teuta (1st)	(North Macedonia) Shkëndija (1st)	(Bosnia and Herzegovina) Borac Banja Luka (1st)
First qualifying round		(Moldova) Sheriff Tiraspol (1st)	(Republic of Ireland) Shamrock Rovers (1st)	(Finland) HJK (1st)	(Georgia (country)) Dinamo Tbilisi (1st)
First qualifying round		(Malta) Hibernians (Abd-2nd)	(Iceland) Valur (Abd-1st)	(Wales) Connah's Quay Nomads (1st)	(Northern Ireland) Linfield (1st)
First qualifying round		(Gibraltar) Lincoln Red Imps (1st)	(Montenegro) Budućnost Podgorica (1st)	(Estonia) Flora (1st)	
Preliminary round		(Kosovo) Prishtina (1st)	(Faroe Islands) HB (1st)	(Andorra) Inter Club d'Escaldes (1st)	(San Marino) Folgore (1st)

Notes

1. Iceland (ISL): The 2020 Úrvalsdeild was abandoned due to the COVID-19 pandemic in Iceland. The top team of the league at the time of the abandonment based on the average number of points per matches played for each team, Valur (who were declared champions), were selected to play in the 2021–22 UEFA Champions League by the Football Association of Iceland.
2. Liechtenstein (LIE): The seven teams affiliated with the Liechtenstein Football Association (LFV) all played in the Swiss football league system. The only competition organised by the LFV was the Liechtenstein Football Cup – the winners of which qualified for the UEFA Europa Conference League.
3. Malta (MLT): The 2020–21 Maltese Premier League was abandoned due to the COVID-19 pandemic in Malta. The top team of the league at the time of the abandonment, Hamrun Spartans, were declared champions but were subsequently banned from competing in European competitions for a match fixing case dating back to 2013. As a result, the second-placed team, Hibernians, were selected to play in the 2021–22 UEFA Champions League by the Malta Football Association.

== Schedule ==
All matches were played on Tuesdays and Wednesdays apart from the preliminary round final, which was played on a Friday, and the final, which was played on a Saturday. The third qualifying round second legs were only played on a Tuesday due to the 2021 UEFA Super Cup on the following Wednesday. Scheduled kick-off times starting from the play-off round were 18:45 (instead of 18:55 previously) and 21:00 CEST/CET.

All draws were held at UEFA headquarters in Nyon, Switzerland, except the group stage draw, which took place in Istanbul, Turkey, on 26 August 2021.

Schedule for 2021–22 UEFA Champions League
Phase	Round	Draw date	First leg	Second leg
Qualifying	Preliminary round	8 June 2021	22 June 2021 (semi-finals)	25 June 2021 (final)
Qualifying	First qualifying round	15 June 2021	6–7 July 2021	13–14 July 2021
Qualifying	Second qualifying round	16 June 2021	20–21 July 2021	27–28 July 2021
Qualifying	Third qualifying round	19 July 2021	3–4 August 2021	10 August 2021
Play-offs	Play-off round	2 August 2021	17–18 August 2021	24–25 August 2021
Group stage	Matchday 1	26 August 2021	14–15 September 2021	
Group stage	Matchday 2	26 August 2021	28–29 September 2021	
Group stage	Matchday 3	26 August 2021	19–20 October 2021	
Group stage	Matchday 4	26 August 2021	2–3 November 2021	
Group stage	Matchday 5	26 August 2021	23–24 November 2021	
Group stage	Matchday 6	26 August 2021	7–8 December 2021	
Knockout phase	Round of 16	13 December 2021	15–16 & 22–23 February 2022	8–9 & 15–16 March 2022
Knockout phase	Quarter-finals	18 March 2022	5–6 April 2022	12–13 April 2022
Knockout phase	Semi-finals	18 March 2022	26–27 April 2022	3–4 May 2022
Knockout phase	Final	18 March 2022	28 May 2022 at Stade de France, Saint-Denis	

== Qualifying rounds ==
=== Preliminary round ===
The draw for the preliminary round was held on 8 June 2021, 12:00 CEST. The preliminary round matches, which consisted of two semi-finals on 22 June 2021 and the final on 25 June 2021, were originally to be played at Gundadalur, Tórshavn in the Faroe Islands, but were moved due to restrictions related to the COVID-19 pandemic in the Faroe Islands. The matches were instead played in Albania, with the semi-finals at Elbasan Arena, Elbasan and Niko Dovana Stadium, Durrës, and the final at Elbasan Arena.

The winner of the preliminary round final advanced to the first qualifying round. The losers of the semi-finals and final were transferred to the Europa Conference League Champions Path second qualifying round.

Team 1	Score	Team 2
Semi-final round
Folgore (San Marino)	0–2	(Kosovo) Prishtina
HB (Faroe Islands)	0–1	(Andorra) Inter Club d'Escaldes
Final round
Prishtina (Kosovo)	2–0	(Andorra) Inter Club d'Escaldes

=== First qualifying round ===
The draw for the first qualifying round was held on 15 June 2021, 12:00 CEST. The first legs were played on 6 and 7 July, and the second legs were played on 13 and 14 July 2021.

The winners of the ties advanced to the Champions Path second qualifying round. The losers were transferred to the Europa Conference League Champions Path second qualifying round.

Team 1	Agg.	Team 2	1st leg	2nd leg
Fola Esch (Luxembourg)	2–7	(Gibraltar) Lincoln Red Imps	2–2	0–5
Slovan Bratislava (Slovakia)	3–2 (Note: Losers drawn to receive a bye to the Europa Conference League third qualifying round.)	(Republic of Ireland) Shamrock Rovers	2–0	1–2
Malmö FF (Sweden)	2–1	(Latvia) Riga	1–0	1–1
Bodø/Glimt (Norway)	2–5	(Poland) Legia Warsaw	2–3	0–2
Connah's Quay Nomads (Wales)	2–3	(Armenia) Alashkert	2–2	0–1 (a.e.t.)
HJK (Finland)	7–1	(Montenegro) Budućnost Podgorica	3–1	4–0
CFR Cluj (Romania)	4–3	(Bosnia and Herzegovina) Borac Banja Luka	3–1	1–2 (a.e.t.)
Shkëndija (North Macedonia)	0–6	(Slovenia) Mura	0–1	0–5
Teuta (Albania)	0–5	(Moldova) Sheriff Tiraspol	0–4	0–1
Dinamo Tbilisi (Georgia (country))	2–4	(Azerbaijan) Neftçi	1–2	1–2
Maccabi Haifa (Israel)	1–3	(Kazakhstan) Kairat	1–1	0–2
Ludogorets Razgrad (Bulgaria)	2–0	(Belarus) Shakhtyor Soligorsk	1–0	1–0
Ferencváros (Hungary)	6–1	(Kosovo) Prishtina	3–0	3–1
Žalgiris (Lithuania)	5–2	(Northern Ireland) Linfield	3–1	2–1
Flora (Estonia)	5–0	(Malta) Hibernians	2–0	3–0
Dinamo Zagreb (Croatia)	5–2	(Iceland) Valur	3–2	2–0

=== Second qualifying round ===
The draw for the second qualifying round was held on 16 June 2021, 12:00 CEST. The first legs were played on 20 and 21 July, and the second legs were played on 27 and 28 July 2021.

The winners of the ties advanced to the third qualifying round of their respective path. The Champions Path losers were transferred to the Europa League Champions Path third qualifying round, while the League Path losers were transferred to the Europa League Main Path third qualifying round.

Team 1	Agg.	Team 2	1st leg	2nd leg
Champions Path
Dinamo Zagreb (Croatia)	3–0	(Cyprus) Omonia	2–0	1–0
Slovan Bratislava (Slovakia)	2–3	(Switzerland) Young Boys	0–0	2–3
Legia Warsaw (Poland)	3–1	(Estonia) Flora	2–1	1–0
Alashkert (Armenia)	1–4	(Moldova) Sheriff Tiraspol	0–1	1–3
Olympiacos (Greece)	2–0	(Azerbaijan) Neftçi	1–0	1–0
Kairat (Kazakhstan)	2–6	(Serbia) Red Star Belgrade	2–1	0–5
Lincoln Red Imps (Gibraltar)	1–4	(Romania) CFR Cluj	1–2	0–2
Malmö FF (Sweden)	4–3	(Finland) HJK	2–1	2–2
Ferencváros (Hungary)	5–1	(Lithuania) Žalgiris	2–0	3–1
Mura (Slovenia)	1–3	(Bulgaria) Ludogorets Razgrad	0–0	1–3
League Path
Rapid Wien (Austria)	2–3	(Czech Republic) Sparta Prague	2–1	0–2
Celtic (Scotland)	2–3	(Denmark) Midtjylland	1–1	1–2 (a.e.t.)
PSV Eindhoven (Netherlands)	7–2	(Turkey) Galatasaray	5–1	2–1

=== Third qualifying round ===
The draw for the third qualifying round was held on 19 July 2021, 12:00 CEST. The first legs were played on 3 and 4 August, and the second legs were played on 10 August 2021.

The winners of the ties advanced to the play-off round of their respective path. The Champions Path losers were transferred to the Europa League play-off round, while the League Path losers were transferred to the Europa League group stage.

Team 1	Agg.	Team 2	1st leg	2nd leg
Champions Path
Dinamo Zagreb (Croatia)	2–1	(Poland) Legia Warsaw	1–1	1–0
CFR Cluj (Romania)	2–4	(Switzerland) Young Boys	1–1	1–3
Olympiacos (Greece)	3–3 (1–4 p)	(Bulgaria) Ludogorets Razgrad	1–1	2–2 (a.e.t.)
Red Star Belgrade (Serbia)	1–2	(Moldova) Sheriff Tiraspol	1–1	0–1
Malmö FF (Sweden)	4–2	(Scotland) Rangers	2–1	2–1
Ferencváros (Hungary)	2–1	(Czech Republic) Slavia Prague	2–0	0–1
League Path
PSV Eindhoven (Netherlands)	4–0	(Denmark) Midtjylland	3–0	1–0
Spartak Moscow (Russia)	0–4	(Portugal) Benfica	0–2	0–2
Genk (Belgium)	2–4	(Ukraine) Shakhtar Donetsk	1–2	1–2
Sparta Prague (Czech Republic)	1–5	(France) Monaco	0–2	1–3

== Play-off round ==
The draw for the play-off round was held on 2 August 2021, 12:00 CEST. The first legs were played on 17 and 18 August, and the second legs were played on 24 and 25 August 2021.

The winners of the ties advanced to the group stage. The losers were transferred to the Europa League group stage.

Team 1	Agg.	Team 2	1st leg	2nd leg
Champions Path
Red Bull Salzburg (Austria)	4–2	(Denmark) Brøndby	2–1	2–1
Young Boys (Switzerland)	6–4	(Hungary) Ferencváros	3–2	3–2
Malmö FF (Sweden)	3–2	(Bulgaria) Ludogorets Razgrad	2–0	1–2
Sheriff Tiraspol (Moldova)	3–0	(Croatia) Dinamo Zagreb	3–0	0–0
League Path
Monaco (France)	2–3	(Ukraine) Shakhtar Donetsk	0–1	2–2 (a.e.t.)
Benfica (Portugal)	2–1	(Netherlands) PSV Eindhoven	2–1	0–0

== Group stage ==
Location of teams of the 2021–22 UEFA Champions League group stage.
Brown: Group A; Red: Group B; Orange: Group C; Yellow: Group D;
Green: Group E; Blue: Group F; Purple: Group G; Pink: Group H.

The draw for the group stage was held in Istanbul, Turkey, on 26 August 2021. The 32 teams were drawn into eight groups of four. For the draw, the teams were seeded into four pots, each of eight teams, based on the following principles:

- Pot 1 contained the Champions League and Europa League title holders, and the champions of the top six associations based on their 2020 UEFA country coefficients.
- Pot 2, 3 and 4 contained the remaining teams, seeded based on their 2021 UEFA club coefficients.

Teams from the same association, and due to political reasons, teams from Ukraine and Russia, could not be drawn into the same group. Before the draw, UEFA formed pairings of teams from the same association (one pairing for associations with two or three teams, two pairings for associations with four or five teams) based on television audiences, where one team was drawn into Groups A–D and another team was drawn into Groups E–H, so that the two teams would play on different days.

The matches were played on 14–15 September, 28–29 September, 19–20 October, 2–3 November, 23–24 November, and 7–9 December 2021. The top two teams of each group advanced to the round of 16. The third-placed teams were transferred to the Europa League knockout round play-offs, while the fourth-placed teams were eliminated from European competitions for the season.

Sheriff Tiraspol made their debut appearance in the group stage. They were the first team from Moldova to play in the Champions League group stage.

=== Group A ===
Pos	Team	Pld	W	D	L	GF	GA	GD	Pts	Qualification	MCI	PAR	RBL	BRU
1	(England) Manchester City	6	4	0	2	18	10	+8	12	Advance to knockout phase	—	2–1	6–3	4–1
2	(France) Paris Saint-Germain	6	3	2	1	13	8	+5	11	Advance to knockout phase	2–0	—	3–2	4–1
3	(Germany) RB Leipzig	6	2	1	3	15	14	+1	7	Transfer to Europa League	2–1	2–2	—	1–2
4	(Belgium) Club Brugge	6	1	1	4	6	20	−14	4		1–5	1–1	0–5	—

Source: UEFA

=== Group B ===
Pos	Team	Pld	W	D	L	GF	GA	GD	Pts	Qualification	LIV	ATM	POR	MIL
1	(England) Liverpool	6	6	0	0	17	6	+11	18	Advance to knockout phase	—	2–0	2–0	3–2
2	(Spain) Atlético Madrid	6	2	1	3	7	8	−1	7	Advance to knockout phase	2–3	—	0–0	0–1
3	(Portugal) Porto	6	1	2	3	4	11	−7	5	Transfer to Europa League	1–5	1–3	—	1–0
4	(Italy) Milan	6	1	1	4	6	9	−3	4		1–2	1–2	1–1	—

Source: UEFA

=== Group C ===
Pos	Team	Pld	W	D	L	GF	GA	GD	Pts	Qualification	AJX	SPO	DOR	BES
1	(Netherlands) Ajax	6	6	0	0	20	5	+15	18	Advance to knockout phase	—	4–2	4–0	2–0
2	(Portugal) Sporting CP	6	3	0	3	14	12	+2	9 (Note: Tied on head-to-head points. Head-to-head goal difference: Sporting CP +1, Borussia Dortmund −1.)	Advance to knockout phase	1–5	—	3–1	4–0
3	(Germany) Borussia Dortmund	6	3	0	3	10	11	−1	9	Transfer to Europa League	1–3	1–0	—	5–0
4	(Turkey) Beşiktaş	6	0	0	6	3	19	−16	0		1–2	1–4	1–2	—

Source: UEFA

=== Group D ===
Pos	Team	Pld	W	D	L	GF	GA	GD	Pts	Qualification	RMA	INT	SHE	SHK
1	(Spain) Real Madrid	6	5	0	1	14	3	+11	15	Advance to knockout phase	—	2–0	1–2	2–1
2	(Italy) Inter Milan	6	3	1	2	8	5	+3	10	Advance to knockout phase	0–1	—	3–1	2–0
3	(Moldova) Sheriff Tiraspol	6	2	1	3	7	11	−4	7	Transfer to Europa League	0–3	1–3	—	2–0
4	(Ukraine) Shakhtar Donetsk	6	0	2	4	2	12	−10	2		0–5	0–0	1–1	—

Source: UEFA

=== Group E ===
Pos	Team	Pld	W	D	L	GF	GA	GD	Pts	Qualification	BAY	BEN	BAR	DKV
1	(Germany) Bayern Munich	6	6	0	0	22	3	+19	18	Advance to knockout phase	—	5–2	3–0	5–0
2	(Portugal) Benfica	6	2	2	2	7	9	−2	8	Advance to knockout phase	0–4	—	3–0	2–0
3	(Spain) Barcelona	6	2	1	3	2	9	−7	7	Transfer to Europa League	0–3	0–0	—	1–0
4	(Ukraine) Dynamo Kyiv	6	0	1	5	1	11	−10	1		1–2	0–0	0–1	—

Source: UEFA

=== Group F ===
Pos	Team	Pld	W	D	L	GF	GA	GD	Pts	Qualification	MUN	VIL	ATA	YB
1	(England) Manchester United	6	3	2	1	11	8	+3	11	Advance to knockout phase	—	2–1	3–2	1–1
2	(Spain) Villarreal	6	3	1	2	12	9	+3	10	Advance to knockout phase	0–2	—	2–2	2–0
3	(Italy) Atalanta	6	1	3	2	12	13	−1	6	Transfer to Europa League	2–2	2–3	—	1–0
4	(Switzerland) Young Boys	6	1	2	3	7	12	−5	5		2–1	1–4	3–3	—

Source: UEFA

=== Group G ===
Pos	Team	Pld	W	D	L	GF	GA	GD	Pts	Qualification	LIL	SAL	SEV	WOL
1	(France) Lille	6	3	2	1	7	4	+3	11	Advance to knockout phase	—	1–0	0–0	0–0
2	(Austria) Red Bull Salzburg	6	3	1	2	8	6	+2	10	Advance to knockout phase	2–1	—	1–0	3–1
3	(Spain) Sevilla	6	1	3	2	5	5	0	6	Transfer to Europa League	1–2	1–1	—	2–0
4	(Germany) VfL Wolfsburg	6	1	2	3	5	10	−5	5		1–3	2–1	1–1	—

Source: UEFA

=== Group H ===
Pos	Team	Pld	W	D	L	GF	GA	GD	Pts	Qualification	JUV	CHE	ZEN	MAL
1	(Italy) Juventus	6	5	0	1	10	6	+4	15	Advance to knockout phase	—	1–0	4–2	1–0
2	(England) Chelsea	6	4	1	1	13	4	+9	13	Advance to knockout phase	4–0	—	1–0	4–0
3	(Russia) Zenit Saint Petersburg	6	1	2	3	10	10	0	5	Transfer to Europa League	0–1	3–3	—	4–0
4	(Sweden) Malmö FF	6	0	1	5	1	14	−13	1		0–3	0–1	1–1	—

Source: UEFA

== Knockout phase ==
In the knockout phase, teams played against each other over two legs on a home-and-away basis, except for the one-match final. The mechanism of the draws for each round was as follows:

- In the draw for the round of 16, the eight group winners were seeded, and the eight group runners-up were unseeded. The seeded teams were drawn against the unseeded teams, with the seeded teams hosting the second leg. Teams from the same group or the same association could not be drawn against each other.
- In the draws for the quarter-finals onwards, there were no seedings, and teams from the same group or the same association could be drawn against each other. As the draws for the quarter-finals onwards were held together before the quarter-finals were played, the identity of the quarter-final winners was not known at the time of the semi-final draw. A draw was also held to determine which semi-final winner was designated as the "home" team for the final (for administrative purposes as it was played at a neutral venue).

=== Bracket ===
Round of 16
(Portugal) Benfica	2	1	3
(Netherlands) Ajax	2	0	2
(Italy) Inter Milan	0	1	1
(England) Liverpool	2	0	2
(Spain) Villarreal	1	3	4
(Italy) Juventus	1	0	1
(Austria) Red Bull Salzburg	1	1	2
(Germany) Bayern Munich	1	7	8
(Portugal) Sporting CP	0	0	0
(England) Manchester City	5	0	5
(Spain) Atlético Madrid	1	1	2
(England) Manchester United	1	0	1
(England) Chelsea	2	2	4
(France) Lille	0	1	1
(France) Paris Saint-Germain	1	1	2
(Spain) Real Madrid	0	3	3

Quarter-finals
(Portugal) Benfica	1	3	4
(England) Liverpool	3	3	6
(Spain) Villarreal	1	1	2
(Germany) Bayern Munich	0	1	1
(England) Manchester City	1	0	1
(Spain) Atlético Madrid	0	0	0
(England) Chelsea	1	3	4
(Spain) Real Madrid (a.e.t.)	3	2	5

Semi-finals
(England) Liverpool	2	3	5
(Spain) Villarreal	0	2	2
(England) Manchester City	4	1	5
(Spain) Real Madrid (a.e.t.)	3	3	6

Final
28 May – Saint-Denis
(England) Liverpool	0
(Spain) Real Madrid	1

=== Round of 16 ===
The draw for the round of 16 was held on 13 December 2021, originally at 12:00 CET. The draw featured multiple irregularities: Manchester United were mistakenly included in the draw for Villarreal's opponent (both were in Group F), and subsequently were selected; another ball was then drawn, with Manchester City chosen instead. In the following tie, Liverpool were mistakenly included in the draw for Atlético Madrid's opponent (both were in Group B), while Manchester United were incorrectly excluded. Later that day, UEFA voided the original draw due to a "technical problem" with the draw computer, and it was entirely redone at 15:00 CET. The first legs were played on 15, 16, 22 and 23 February, and the second legs were played on 8, 9, 15 and 16 March 2022.

Team 1	Agg.	Team 2	1st leg	2nd leg
Red Bull Salzburg (Austria)	2–8	(Germany) Bayern Munich	1–1	1–7
Sporting CP (Portugal)	0–5	(England) Manchester City	0–5	0–0
Benfica (Portugal)	3–2	(Netherlands) Ajax	2–2	1–0
Chelsea (England)	4–1	(France) Lille	2–0	2–1
Atlético Madrid (Spain)	2–1	(England) Manchester United	1–1	1–0
Villarreal (Spain)	4–1	(Italy) Juventus	1–1	3–0
Inter Milan (Italy)	1–2	(England) Liverpool	0–2	1–0
Paris Saint-Germain (France)	2–3	(Spain) Real Madrid	1–0	1–3

=== Quarter-finals ===
The draw for the quarter-finals was held on 18 March 2022, 12:00 CET. The first legs were played on 5 and 6 April, and the second legs were played on 12 and 13 April 2022.

Team 1	Agg.	Team 2	1st leg	2nd leg
Chelsea (England)	4–5	(Spain) Real Madrid	1–3	3–2 (a.e.t.)
Manchester City (England)	1–0	(Spain) Atlético Madrid	1–0	0–0
Villarreal (Spain)	2–1	(Germany) Bayern Munich	1–0	1–1
Benfica (Portugal)	4–6	(England) Liverpool	1–3	3–3

=== Semi-finals ===
The draw for the semi-finals was held on 18 March 2022, 12:00 CET, after the quarter-final draw. The first legs were played on 26 and 27 April, and the second legs were played on 3 and 4 May 2022.

Team 1	Agg.	Team 2	1st leg	2nd leg
Manchester City (England)	5–6	(Spain) Real Madrid	4–3	1–3 (a.e.t.)
Liverpool (England)	5–2	(Spain) Villarreal	2–0	3–2

=== Final ===
The final was played on 28 May 2022 at the Stade de France in Saint-Denis. A draw was held on 18 March 2022, after the quarter-final and semi-final draws, to determine the "home" team for administrative purposes.

28 May 2022
21:36 UTC+2 (Note: The final, originally scheduled for 21:00, was delayed 36 minutes due to security issues with fans entering the stadium.)

Liverpool (England)	0–1	(Spain) Real Madrid
	Report	Vinícius 59'

Stade de France, Saint-Denis
Attendance: 75,000
Referee: Clément Turpin (France)

== Statistics ==
Statistics exclude qualifying rounds and play-off round.

=== Top goalscorers ===
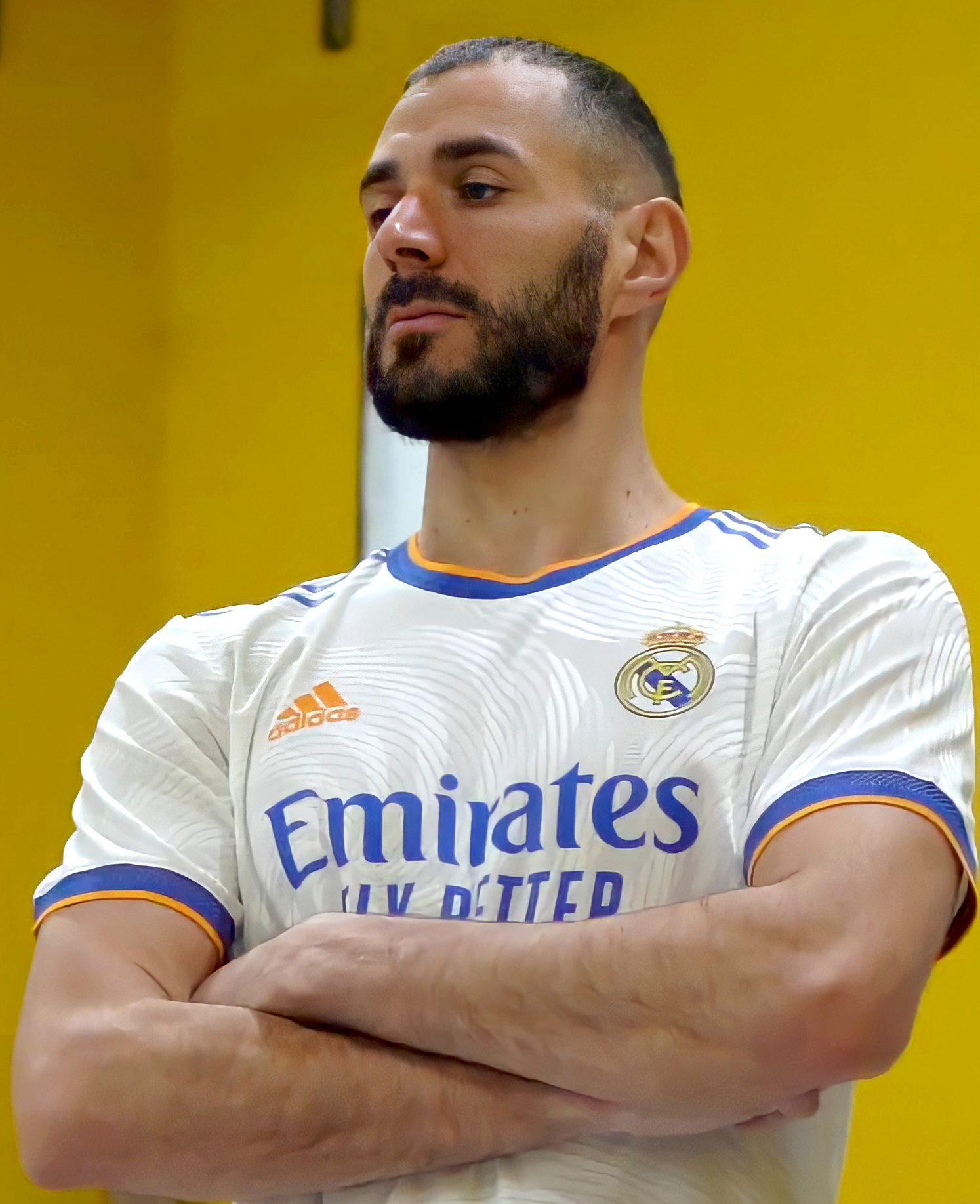
Real Madrid forward Karim Benzema finished the tournament as the top scorer with 15 goals, and was named the inaugural Champions League Player of the Season.

Rank	Player	Team	Goals	Minutes played
1	(France) Karim Benzema	(Spain) Real Madrid	15	1106
2	(Poland) Robert Lewandowski	(Germany) Bayern Munich	13	876
3	(Ivory Coast) Sébastien Haller	(Netherlands) Ajax	11	668
4	(Egypt) Mohamed Salah	(England) Liverpool	8	1008
5	(France) Christopher Nkunku	(Germany) RB Leipzig	7	531
5	(Algeria) Riyad Mahrez	(England) Manchester City	7	986
7	(Portugal) Cristiano Ronaldo	(England) Manchester United	6	611
7	(Uruguay) Darwin Núñez	(Portugal) Benfica	6	613
7	(France) Kylian Mbappé	(France) Paris Saint-Germain	6	673
7	(Germany) Leroy Sané	(Germany) Bayern Munich	6	798
7	(Netherlands) Arnaut Danjuma	(Spain) Villarreal	6	906

=== Team of the season ===
The UEFA technical study group selected the following players as the team of the tournament.

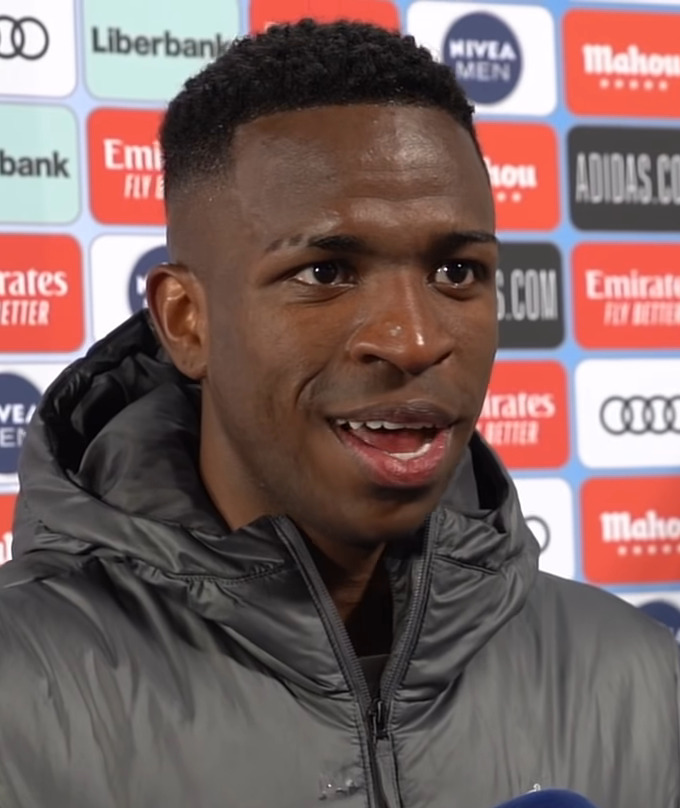
Real Madrid forward Vinícius Júnior was named the inaugural Champions League Young Player of the Season.

Pos.	Player	Team
GK	(Belgium) Thibaut Courtois	(Spain) Real Madrid
DF	(England) Trent Alexander-Arnold	(England) Liverpool
DF	(Germany) Antonio Rüdiger	(England) Chelsea
DF	(Netherlands) Virgil van Dijk	(England) Liverpool
DF	(Scotland) Andy Robertson	(England) Liverpool
MF	(Belgium) Kevin De Bruyne	(England) Manchester City
MF	(Brazil) Fabinho	(England) Liverpool
MF	(Croatia) Luka Modrić	(Spain) Real Madrid
FW	(France) Kylian Mbappé	(France) Paris Saint-Germain
FW	(France) Karim Benzema	(Spain) Real Madrid
FW	(Brazil) Vinícius Júnior	(Spain) Real Madrid

=== Player of the Season ===
- (France) Karim Benzema ( (Spain) Real Madrid)

=== Young Player of the Season ===
- (Brazil) Vinícius Júnior ( (Spain) Real Madrid)

== European Super League controversy ==
On 18 April 2021, UEFA, the Football Association, the Premier League, the Italian Football Federation, Serie A, the Royal Spanish Football Federation and La Liga learned of plans from several English, Italian and Spanish clubs to create the European Super League. UEFA and the national associations announced that if such a league were to be established, its participants would be banned from playing in international and domestic competitions. Later that same day, English clubs (Arsenal, Chelsea, Liverpool, Manchester City, Manchester United and Tottenham Hotspur), Italian clubs (Inter Milan, Juventus and Milan) and Spanish clubs (Atlético Madrid, Barcelona and Real Madrid) announced the establishment of the Super League, putting them at risk of being banned.

On 20 April 2021, Arsenal, Liverpool, Manchester City, Manchester United and Tottenham Hotspur withdrew after the Football Association threatened to ban participating clubs from domestic football, whilst Chelsea withdrew some hours later. This led to the project's collapse, as Atlético Madrid, Inter Milan and AC Milan followed the English clubs by withdrawing. The Super League suspended its operations, with the case to be taken by the Court of Justice of the European Union (CJEU) to establish whether UEFA and FIFA have the exclusive right to organise competitions.

On 7 June 2021, the Swiss Federal Department of Justice and Police notified UEFA and FIFA of the Spanish precautionary measure – which had earlier issued an injunction against UEFA and FIFA and referred a cuestión preliminar (English: preliminary question) to the CJEU on whether UEFA and FIFA have violated articles 101 and 102 of the TFEU – ruling that neither governing body could not execute sanctions against Super League clubs. On 15 June 2021, it was officially confirmed that the remaining three clubs (Barcelona, Juventus and Real Madrid) – which did not sign the Commitment Declaration of the sanctioned other nine clubs and filed a new motion to scrap the agreement UEFA signed with those nine clubs – were admitted to the 2021–22 UEFA Champions League, pending the disciplinary proceedings UEFA opened against them but which were suspended after the Swiss notification.

== See also ==
- 2021–22 UEFA Europa League
- 2021–22 UEFA Europa Conference League
- 2022 UEFA Super Cup
- 2021–22 UEFA Women's Champions League
- 2021–22 UEFA Youth League
- 2021–22 UEFA Futsal Champions League
