= 2021–22 FC Bayern Munich season =

123rd season in existence of Bayern Munich

Bayern Munich
2021–22 season
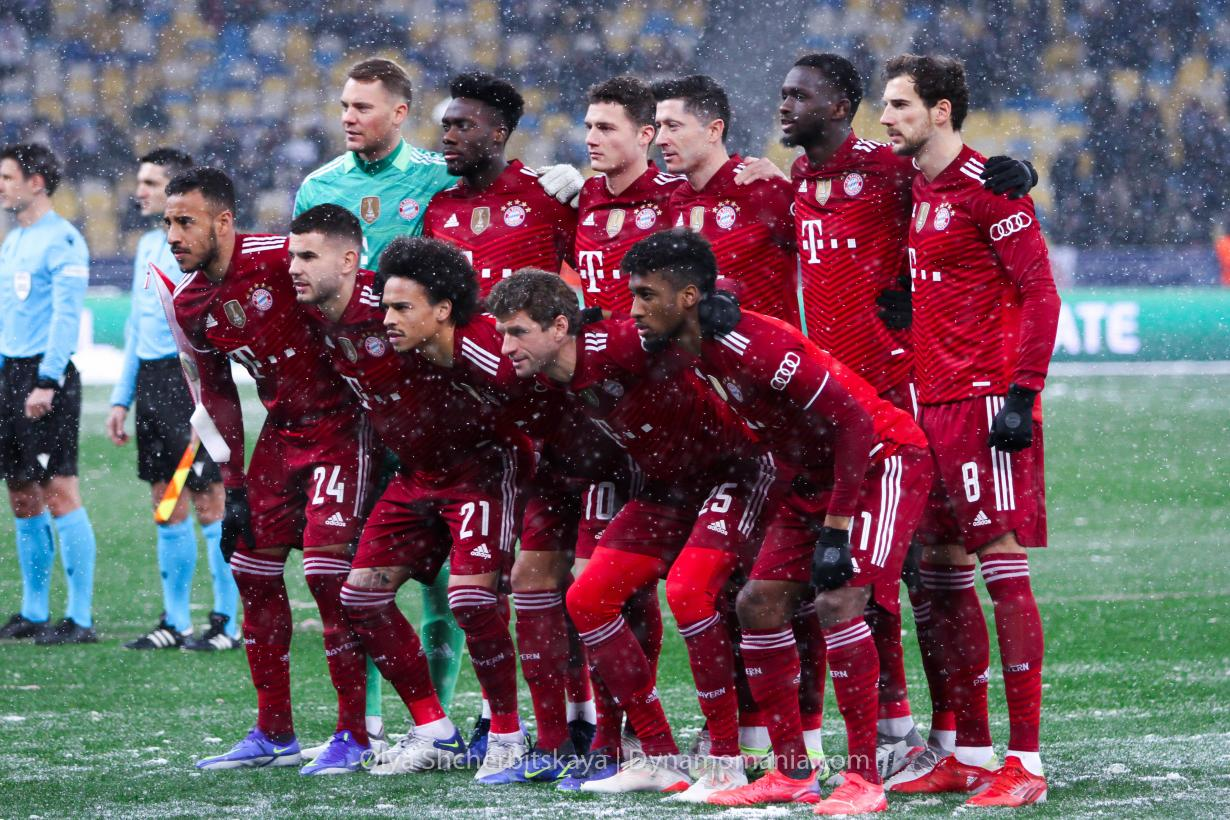
- President: Herbert Hainer
- CEO: Oliver Kahn
- Head coach: Julian Nagelsmann
- Stadium: Allianz Arena
- Bundesliga: 1st
- DFB-Pokal: Second round
- DFL-Supercup: Winners
- UEFA Champions League: Quarter-finals
- Top goalscorer: League: Robert Lewandowski (35 goals); All: Robert Lewandowski (50 goals)
- Highest home attendance: 75,000 v SC Freiburg
- Lowest home attendance: 0 v Barcelona
- Biggest win: 12–0 vs Bremer SV
- Biggest defeat: 0–5 vs Borussia Mönchengladbach
Home colours	Away colours	Third colours

2022–23 home kit, used in the last home game of the season against VfB Stuttgart.

The 2021–22 season was the 123rd season in the existence of FC Bayern Munich and the club's 57th consecutive season in the top flight of German football. In addition to the domestic league, Bayern Munich participated in this season's editions of the DFB-Pokal and the UEFA Champions League, as well as the DFL-Supercup as winners of the 2020–21 Bundesliga.

The season was the first since 2008–09 without David Alaba, who departed to Real Madrid, the first since 2011–12 without Javi Martínez, who departed to Qatar SC, and the first since 2010–11 without Jérôme Boateng, who departed to Lyon.

== Players ==
=== Squad ===
As of 31 January 2022

Note: Flags indicate national team as defined under FIFA eligibility rules; some limited exceptions apply. Players may hold more than one non-FIFA nationality.

No.	Pos.	Nation	Player
1	GK	GER	Manuel Neuer (captain)
2	DF	FRA	Dayot Upamecano
3	DF	ENG	Omar Richards
4	DF	GER	Niklas Süle
5	DF	FRA	Benjamin Pavard
6	MF	GER	Joshua Kimmich
7	FW	GER	Serge Gnabry
8	MF	GER	Leon Goretzka
9	FW	POL	Robert Lewandowski (3rd captain)
10	FW	GER	Leroy Sané
11	FW	FRA	Kingsley Coman
13	FW	CMR	Eric Maxim Choupo-Moting
14	MF	GER	Paul Wanner

No.	Pos.	Nation	Player
18	MF	AUT	Marcel Sabitzer
19	DF	CAN	Alphonso Davies
20	DF	SEN	Bouna Sarr
21	DF	FRA	Lucas Hernandez
22	MF	ESP	Marc Roca
23	DF	FRA	Tanguy Nianzou
24	MF	FRA	Corentin Tolisso
25	FW	GER	Thomas Müller (vice-captain)
26	GK	GER	Sven Ulreich
36	GK	GER	Christian Früchtl
40	FW	USA	Malik Tillman
42	MF	GER	Jamal Musiala
44	DF	CRO	Josip Stanišić

=== Other players with first-team appearances ===
Note: Flags indicate national team as defined under FIFA eligibility rules; some limited exceptions apply. Players may hold more than one non-FIFA nationality.

No.	Pos.	Nation	Player
32	MF	GER	Christopher Scott
34	FW	GER	Lucas Copado
37	MF	USA	Taylor Booth

No.	Pos.	Nation	Player
38	FW	CRO	Gabriel Vidović
47	FW	GER	Armindo Sieb

=== Out on loan ===
Note: Flags indicate national team as defined under FIFA eligibility rules; some limited exceptions apply. Players may hold more than one non-FIFA nationality.

No.	Pos.	Nation	Player
—	GK	GER	Alexander Nübel (at Monaco until 30 June 2023)
—	GK	GER	Ron-Thorben Hoffmann (at Sunderland until 30 June 2022)
—	DF	GER	Lars Lukas Mai (at Werder Bremen until 30 June 2022)
—	DF	USA	Chris Richards (at Hoffenheim until 30 June 2022)
—	MF	GER	Adrian Fein (at Dynamo Dresden until 30 June 2022)

No.	Pos.	Nation	Player
—	MF	NZL	Sarpreet Singh (at Jahn Regensburg until 30 June 2022)
—	MF	CRO	Lovro Zvonarek (at Slaven Belupo until 30 June 2022)
—	FW	NED	Joshua Zirkzee (at Anderlecht until 30 June 2022)
—	FW	GER	Fiete Arp (at Holstein Kiel until 30 June 2022)
—	DF	GER	Bright Arrey-Mbi (at 1. FC Köln until 30 June 2023)

== Transfers ==
=== In ===
No.	Pos	Player	Transferred from	Fee	Date	Source
3	DF	(England) Omar Richards	(England) Reading	Free transfer	1 July 2021	
2	DF	(France) Dayot Upamecano	(Germany) RB Leipzig	€42,500,000	1 July 2021	
26	GK	(Germany) Sven Ulreich	(Germany) Hamburger SV	Free transfer	1 July 2021	
–	MF	(Austria) Emilian Metu	(Austria) SKN St. Pölten	Undisclosed, will join Bayern Munich II	1 August 2021	
18	MF	(Austria) Marcel Sabitzer	(Germany) RB Leipzig	€16,000,000	30 August 2021	
–	MF	(Croatia) Lovro Zvonarek	(Croatia) Slaven Belupo	€1,800,000; will join Bayern Munich II in July 2022	10 September 2021	
–	MF	(South Korea) Lee Hyun-ju	(South Korea) Pohang Steelers	Loan, will join Bayern Munich II	14 January 2022	
30	MF	(Germany) Adrian Fein	(Germany) Greuther Fürth	Loan return	30 January 2022	
–	GK	(China) Liu Shaoziyang	(China) Wuhan Three Towns	€1,000,000; will join Bayern Munich U19	2 February 2022	

=== Out ===
No.	Pos	Player	Transferred to	Fee	Date	Source
–	FW	(Germany) Fiete Arp	(Germany) Holstein Kiel	Loan, €50,000	25 June 2021	
8	MF	(Spain) Javi Martínez	Qatar SC	Free transfer	1 July 2021	
17	DF	(Germany) Jérôme Boateng	(France) Lyon	Free transfer	1 July 2021	
27	DF	(Austria) David Alaba	(Spain) Real Madrid	Free transfer	1 July 2021	
33	DF	(Germany) Lars Lukas Mai	(Germany) Werder Bremen	Loan	1 July 2021	
35	GK	(Germany) Alexander Nübel	Monaco	Loan	1 July 2021	
–	FW	(Germany) Nicolas-Gerrit Kühn	(Germany) Erzgebirge Aue	Loan	1 July 2021	
28	MF	(New Zealand) Sarpreet Singh	(Germany) Jahn Regensburg	Loan	6 July 2021	
30	DF	(Germany) Adrian Fein	(Germany) Greuther Fürth	Loan	14 July 2021	
14	FW	(Netherlands) Joshua Zirkzee	(Belgium) Anderlecht	Loan	3 August 2021	
15	DF	(United States) Chris Richards	(Germany) 1899 Hoffenheim	Loan	3 August 2021	
39	GK	(Germany) Ron-Thorben Hoffmann	(England) Sunderland	Loan	3 August 2021	
–	DF	(France) Rémy Vita	(England) Barnsley	Loan	31 August 2021	
–	FW	(Albania) Marvin Çuni	(Germany) SC Paderborn	Loan	1 September 2021	
–	MF	(Croatia) Lovro Zvonarek	(Croatia) Slaven Belupo	Loan	10 September 2021	
17	MF	(France) Michaël Cuisance	(Italy) Venezia	€4,500,000	3 January 2022	
30	MF	(Germany) Adrian Fein	(Germany) Dynamo Dresden	Loan	31 January 2022	
34	FW	(Germany) Oliver Batista Meier	(Germany) Dynamo Dresden	€300,000	31 January 2022	
43	DF	(Germany) Bright Arrey-Mbi	(Germany) 1. FC Köln	Loan	31 January 2022	
–	GK	(China) Liu Shaoziyang	Austria Klagenfurt	Loan	2 February 2022	
–	FW	(Serbia) Nemanja Motika	(Serbia) Red Star Belgrade	€2,500,000	2 February 2022	
–	MF	(Germany) Marcel Wenig	(Germany) Eintracht Frankfurt	Free transfer	17 February 2022	

== Pre-season and friendlies ==
Win Draw Loss Fixtures

17 July 2021 Friendly	1. FC Köln	3–2	Bayern Munich	Villingen-Schwenningen, Germany
16:00 CEST (UTC+2)	Thielmann 20'; Uth 27', 56'; Schmitz (yellow card) 80'	Report	Sieb 6'; Zirkzee 34'; Sarr (yellow card) 53'	Stadium: MS Technologie Arena; Referee: Daniel Schlager

24 July 2021 Friendly	Bayern Munich	2–2	Ajax	Munich, Germany
16:30 CEST (UTC+2)	Choupo-Moting 40'; Nianzou 48'; Lawrence (yellow card) 89'	Report	Labyad 10'; Jensen 50'	Stadium: Allianz Arena; Attendance: 8,500; Referee: Tobias Reichel

28 July 2021 Friendly	Bayern Munich	0–2	Borussia Mönchengladbach	Munich, Germany
18:00 CEST (UTC+2)		Report	Wolf 60'; Wentzel 77'	Stadium: Allianz Arena; Referee: Robert Hartmann

31 July 2021 Audi Football Summit	Bayern Munich	0–3	Napoli	Munich, Germany
16:30 CEST (UTC+2)	Richards (yellow card) 78'	Report	Osimhen 69', 71'; Machach 85'	Stadium: Allianz Arena; Attendance: 10,000; Referee: Felix Brych

== Competitions ==
=== Overall record ===
Competition	First match	Last match	Starting round	Final position	Record							
Competition	First match	Last match	Starting round	Final position	Pld	W	D	L	GF	GA	GD	Win %
Bundesliga	13 August 2021	14 May 2022	Matchday 1	Winners	34	24	5	5	97	37	+60	70.59
DFB-Pokal	25 August 2021	27 October 2021	First round	Second round	2	1	0	1	12	5	+7	50.00
DFL-Supercup	17 August 2021		Final	Winners	1	1	0	0	3	1	+2	100.00
UEFA Champions League	14 September 2021	12 April 2022	Group stage	Quarter-finals	10	7	2	1	31	7	+24	70.00
Total					47	33	7	7	143	50	+93	70.21

Source: Soccerway

=== Bundesliga ===
==== League table ====
Pos	Team	Pld	W	D	L	GF	GA	GD	Pts	Qualification or relegation
1	Bayern Munich (C)	34	24	5	5	97	37	+60	77	Qualification for the Champions League group stage
2	Borussia Dortmund	34	22	3	9	85	52	+33	69	Qualification for the Champions League group stage
3	Bayer Leverkusen	34	19	7	8	80	47	+33	64	Qualification for the Champions League group stage
4	RB Leipzig	34	17	7	10	72	37	+35	58	Qualification for the Champions League group stage
5	Union Berlin	34	16	9	9	50	44	+6	57	Qualification for the Europa League group stage (Note: Since the 2021–22 DFB-Pokal winners, RB Leipzig, qualified for the Champions League based on league position, the Europa League group stage spot was passed to the sixth-placed team, and the Europa Conference League play-off round spot was passed to the seventh-placed team.)

Source: DFB
Rules for classification: 1) Points; 2) Goal difference; 3) Goals scored; 4) Head-to-head results; 5) Head-to-head away goals scored; 6) Away goals scored; 7) Play-off.
(C) Champions

==== Results summary ====
Overall								Home						Away					
Pld	W	D	L	GF	GA	GD	Pts	W	D	L	GF	GA	GD	W	D	L	GF	GA	GD
34	24	5	5	97	37	+60	77	13	2	2	48	15	+33	11	3	3	49	22	+27

Source: DFB

==== Results by round ====
Round	1	2	3	4	5	6	7	8	9	10	11	12	13	14	15	16	17	18	19	20	21	22	23	24	25	26	27	28	29	30	31	32	33	34
Ground	A	H	H	A	H	A	H	A	H	A	H	A	H	A	H	A	H	H	A	A	H	A	H	A	H	A	H	A	H	A	H	A	H	A
Result	D	W	W	W	W	W	L	W	W	W	W	L	W	W	W	W	W	L	W	W	W	L	W	W	D	D	W	W	W	W	W	L	D	D
Position	7	4	3	2	1	1	1	1	1	1	1	1	1	1	1	1	1	1	1	1	1	1	1	1	1	1	1	1	1	1	1	1	1	1

Source: DFB
A = Away; H = Home; W = Win; D = Draw; L = Loss

==== Matches ====
The league fixtures were announced on 25 June 2021.

13 August 2021 1	Borussia Mönchengladbach	1–1	Bayern Munich	Mönchengladbach
20:30 CEST (UTC+2)	Pléa 10'; Stindl (yellow card) 58'; Neuhaus (yellow card) 90+1'	Report	Lewandowski 42'	Stadium: Borussia-Park; Attendance: 22,925; Referee: Marco Fritz

22 August 2021 2	Bayern Munich	3–2	1. FC Köln	Munich
17:30 CEST (UTC+2)	Lewandowski 50'; Gnabry 59', 71'; Süle (yellow card) 75'	Report	Ljubicic (yellow card) 20'; Modeste 60'; Uth 62'	Stadium: Allianz Arena; Attendance: 20,000; Referee: Martin Petersen

28 August 2021 3	Bayern Munich	5–0	Hertha BSC	Munich
18:30 CEST (UTC+2)	Müller 6'; Lewandowski 35', 70', 84'; Musiala 49'	Report		Stadium: Allianz Arena; Attendance: 25,000; Referee: Sven Jablonski

11 September 2021 4	RB Leipzig	1–4	Bayern Munich	Leipzig
18:30 CEST (UTC+2)	Laimer 58'	Report	Lewandowski 12' (pen.); Musiala 47'; Sané 54'; Choupo-Moting 90+2'	Stadium: Red Bull Arena; Attendance: 34,000; Referee: Deniz Aytekin

18 September 2021 5	Bayern Munich	7–0	VfL Bochum	Munich
15:30 CEST (UTC+2)	Sané 17'; Kimmich 27', 65'; Gnabry 32'; Lampropoulos 43' (o.g.); Stanišić (yellow card) 52'; Lewandowski 61'; Choupo-Moting 79'	Report	Stafylidis (yellow card) 35'	Stadium: Allianz Arena; Attendance: 25,000; Referee: Tobias Welz

24 September 2021 6	Greuther Fürth	1–3	Bayern Munich	Fürth
20:30 CEST (UTC+2)	Hrgota (yellow card) 20'; Viergever (yellow card) 53'; Abiama (yellow card) 67'; Barry (yellow card) 83'; Itten 88'	Report	Müller 10'; Kimmich 31'; Sané (yellow card) 44'; Pavard (red card) 48'; Griesbeck 68' (o.g.)	Stadium: Sportpark Ronhof; Attendance: 11,740; Referee: Robert Schröder

3 October 2021 7	Bayern Munich	1–2	Eintracht Frankfurt	Munich
17:30 CEST (UTC+2)	Goretzka 29'; Davies (yellow card) 50'; Upamecano (yellow card) 77'	Report	Hinteregger 32'; Hauge (yellow card) 78'; Kostić 83'	Stadium: Allianz Arena; Attendance: 25,000; Referee: Florian Badstübner

17 October 2021 8	Bayer Leverkusen	1–5	Bayern Munich	Leverkusen
15:30 CEST (UTC+2)	Schick 55'	Report	Lewandowski 4', 30'; Müller 34'; Gnabry 35', 37'	Stadium: BayArena; Attendance: 29,542; Referee: Sven Jablonski

23 October 2021 9	Bayern Munich	4–0	1899 Hoffenheim	Munich
15:30 CEST (UTC+2)	Gnabry 16'; Lewandowski 30'; Choupo-Moting 82'; Coman 87'	Report	Samassékou (yellow card) 10'; Rudy (yellow card) 60'; Raum (yellow card) 75'; Grillitsch (yellow card) 90+1'	Stadium: Allianz Arena; Attendance: 60,000; Referee: Matthias Jöllenbeck

30 October 2021 10	Union Berlin	2–5	Bayern Munich	Berlin
15:30 CEST (UTC+2)	Jaeckel (yellow card) 15'; Gießelmann 43'; Ryerson 65'	Report	Lewandowski 15' (pen.), 23'; Süle (yellow card) 30'; Sané 35'; Coman 61'; Müller 80'	Stadium: Stadion An der Alten Försterei; Attendance: 16,509; Referee: Harm Osmers

6 November 2021 11	Bayern Munich	2–1	SC Freiburg	Munich
15:30 CET (UTC+1)	Goretzka 30'; Lewandowski 75'	Report	Haberer 90+2'	Stadium: Allianz Arena; Attendance: 75,000; Referee: Sascha Stegemann

19 November 2021 12	FC Augsburg	2–1	Bayern Munich	Augsburg
20:30 CET (UTC+1)	Valentin 23'; Hahn 36', (yellow card) 45'; Framberger (yellow card) 79'	Report	Lewandowski 38'; Hernandez (yellow card) 45+1'	Stadium: WWK Arena; Attendance: 26,000; Referee: Daniel Siebert

27 November 2021 13	Bayern Munich	1–0	Arminia Bielefeld	Munich
18:30 CET (UTC+1)	Hernandez (yellow card) 64'; Sané 71'	Report	Lasme (yellow card) 82'	Stadium: Allianz Arena; Attendance: 12,000; Referee: Marco Fritz

4 December 2021 14	Borussia Dortmund	2–3	Bayern Munich	Dortmund
18:30 CET (UTC+1)	Brandt 5'; Haaland 48'; Can (yellow card) 51'; Bellingham (yellow card) 86'	Report	Lewandowski 9', 77' (pen.), (yellow card) 88'; Coman 44'; Upamecano (yellow card) 90+5'	Stadium: Signal Iduna Park; Attendance: 15,000; Referee: Felix Zwayer

11 December 2021 15	Bayern Munich	2–1	Mainz 05	Munich
15:30 CET (UTC+1)	Musiala (yellow card) 27', (goal) 74'; Sané (yellow card) 36'; Coman 53'; Hernandez (yellow card) 56'	Report	Onisiwo 22'; Stach (yellow card) 59'; Hack (yellow card) 89'; Stöger (yellow card) 90+1'	Stadium: Allianz Arena; Attendance: 0 Referee: Benjamin Cortus

14 December 2021 16	VfB Stuttgart	0–5	Bayern Munich	Stuttgart
18:30 CET (UTC+1)	Karazor (yellow card) 64'	Report	Gnabry 40', 53', 74'; Davies (yellow card) 55'; Lewandowski 69', 72'	Stadium: Mercedes-Benz Arena; Attendance: 0 Referee: Robert Schröder

17 December 2021 17	Bayern Munich	4–0	VfL Wolfsburg	Munich
20:30 CET (UTC+1)	Müller 7'; Upamecano 57'; Sané 59'; Lewandowski 87'	Report		Stadium: Allianz Arena; Attendance: 0 Referee: Tobias Welz

7 January 2022 18	Bayern Munich	1–2	Borussia Mönchengladbach	Munich
20:30 CET (UTC+1)	Lewandowski 18'	Report	Neuhaus 27'; Lainer 31'; Stindl (yellow card) 78'	Stadium: Allianz Arena; Attendance: 0 Referee: Daniel Siebert

15 January 2022 19	1. FC Köln	0–4	Bayern Munich	Cologne
15:30 CET (UTC+1)	Kilian (yellow card) 9'	Report	Lewandowski 9', 63', 74'; Tolisso 25'	Stadium: RheinEnergieStadion; Attendance: 1,000; Referee: Tobias Welz

23 January 2022 20	Hertha BSC	1–4	Bayern Munich	Berlin
17:30 CET (UTC+1)	Serdar (yellow card) 70'; Ekkelenkamp 81'	Report	Tolisso 25'; Müller 45'; Sané 75'; Gnabry 79'	Stadium: Olympiastadion; Attendance: 3,000; Referee: Bastian Dankert

5 February 2022 21	Bayern Munich	3–2	RB Leipzig	Munich
18:30 CET (UTC+1)	Müller 12'; Hernandez (yellow card) 22'; Lewandowski 44'; Gvardiol 58' (o.g.)	Report	Silva 27'; Laimer (yellow card) 45+1'; Nkunku 53', (yellow card) 63'; Henrichs (yellow card) 74'	Stadium: Allianz Arena; Attendance: 10,000; Referee: Sven Jablonski

12 February 2022 22	VfL Bochum	4–2	Bayern Munich	Bochum
15:30 CET (UTC+1)	Antwi-Adjei 14'; Locadia 38' (pen.); Gamboa 40', (yellow card) 58'; Holtmann 44'; Rexhbeçaj (yellow card) 74'	Report	Lewandowski 9', 75'; Pavard (yellow card) 90'	Stadium: Vonovia Ruhrstadion; Attendance: 8,500; Referee: Robert Schröder

20 February 2022 23	Bayern Munich	4–1	Greuther Fürth	Munich
15:30 CET (UTC+1)	Lewandowski (yellow card) 45', (goal) 47', 82'; Griesbeck 61' (o.g.); Kimmich (yellow card) 88'; Choupo-Moting 90+1'	Report	Hrgota 43'; Bauer (yellow card) 80'	Stadium: Allianz Arena; Attendance: 25,000; Referee: Robert Hartmann

26 February 2022 24	Eintracht Frankfurt	0–1	Bayern Munich	Frankfurt
18:30 CET (UTC+1)	Lenz (yellow card) 32'	Report	Hernandez (yellow card) 32'; Kimmich (yellow card) 64'; Sané 71'	Stadium: Deutsche Bank Park; Attendance: 25,000; Referee: Florian Badstübner

5 March 2022 25	Bayern Munich	1–1	Bayer Leverkusen	Munich
15:30 CET (UTC+1)	Süle 18'; Coman (yellow card) 72'	Report	Bakker (yellow card) 32'; Müller 36' (o.g.); Demirbay (yellow card) 54'	Stadium: Allianz Arena; Attendance: 25,000; Referee: Daniel Siebert

12 March 2022 26	1899 Hoffenheim	1–1	Bayern Munich	Sinsheim
15:30 CET (UTC+1)	Samassékou (yellow card) 30'; Baumgartner 32'; Grillitsch (yellow card) 38'; Rutter (yellow card) 45+1'; Posch (yellow card) 66'	Report	Hernandez (yellow card) 44'; Lewandowski 45+3'	Stadium: Rhein-Neckar-Arena; Attendance: 25,600; Referee: Robert Schröder

19 March 2022 27	Bayern Munich	4–0	Union Berlin	Munich
18:30 CET (UTC+1)	Coman 16'; Nianzou 25', (yellow card) 75'; Lewandowski 45+1' (pen.), 47'; Musiala (yellow card) 51'	Report	Baumgartl (yellow card) 39'	Stadium: Allianz Arena; Attendance: 37,000; Referee: Harm Osmers

2 April 2022 28	SC Freiburg	1–4	Bayern Munich	Freiburg
15:30 CEST (UTC+2)	Petersen 63'; Günter (yellow card) 70'	Report	Goretzka 58'; Gnabry 73'; Coman 82'; Upamecano (yellow card) 90+3'; Sabitzer 90+6'	Stadium: Europa-Park Stadion; Attendance: 34,700; Referee: Christian Dingert

9 April 2022 29	Bayern Munich	1–0	FC Augsburg	Munich
15:30 CEST (UTC+2)	Nianzou (yellow card) 68'; Lewandowski 82' (pen.)	Report	Oxford (yellow card) 36'; Dorsch (yellow card) 90+2'	Stadium: Allianz Arena; Attendance: 75,000; Referee: Patrick Ittrich

17 April 2022 30	Arminia Bielefeld	0–3	Bayern Munich	Bielefeld
15:30 CEST (UTC+2)	Kunze (yellow card) 25'	Report	Laursen 10' (o.g.); Nianzou (yellow card) 45'; Gnabry 45+7'; Kimmich (yellow card) 65'; Musiala 85'	Stadium: Bielefelder Alm; Attendance: 26,419; Referee: Matthias Jöllenbeck

23 April 2022 31	Bayern Munich	3–1	Borussia Dortmund	Munich
18:30 CEST (UTC+2)	Gnabry 15'; Lewandowski 34'; Musiala 83'	Report	Can (yellow card) 40', (goal) 52' (pen.)	Stadium: Allianz Arena; Attendance: 75,000; Referee: Daniel Siebert

30 April 2022 32	Mainz 05	3–1	Bayern Munich	Mainz
15:30 CEST (UTC+2)	Burkardt 18'; Niakhaté 27'; Barreiro 57'	Report	Lewandowski 33'; Kimmich (yellow card) 43'; Hernandez (yellow card) 65'; Pavard (yellow card) 73'; Sané (yellow card) 86'	Stadium: Mewa Arena; Attendance: 33,305; Referee: Sascha Stegemann

8 May 2022 33	Bayern Munich	2–2	VfB Stuttgart	Munich
17:30 CEST (UTC+2)	Nianzou (yellow card) 6'; Gnabry 35'; Müller 44'; Davies (yellow card) 90+1'; Coman (red card) 90+6'	Report	Tomás 8'; Karazor (yellow card) 39'; Führich (yellow card) 50'; Kalajdžić 52'; Coulibaly (yellow card) 74'	Stadium: Allianz Arena; Attendance: 75,000; Referee: Deniz Aytekin

14 May 2022 34	VfL Wolfsburg	2–2	Bayern Munich	Wolfsburg
15:30 CEST (UTC+2)	L. Nmecha (yellow card) 42'; Wind 45'; Kruse 22'	Report	Stanišić 17'; Lewandowski 40'; Upamecano (yellow card) 77'; Richards (yellow card) 88'	Stadium: Volkswagen Arena; Attendance: 30,000; Referee: Robert Hartmann

=== DFB-Pokal ===
25 August 2021 (Note: The Bremer SV v Bayern Munich match, originally scheduled on 6 August 2021, 20:45, was postponed because Bremer was put in quarantine, after several positive COVID-19 tests by their players.) First round	Bremer SV	0–12	Bayern Munich	Bremen (Note: The Bremer SV v Bayern Munich match took place at the Wohninvest Weserstadion instead of Bremer SV's home stadium, the Stadion am Panzenberg.)
20:15 CEST (UTC+2)	Nobile (red card) 77'	Report	Choupo-Moting 8', 28', 35', 82'; Musiala 16', 48'; Warm 27' (o.g.); Tillman 47'; Sané 65'; Cuisance 80'; Nianzou (yellow card) 84'; Sarr 86'; Tolisso 88'	Stadium: Wohninvest Weserstadion; Attendance: 10,093; Referee: Nicolas Winter

27 October 2021 Second round	Borussia Mönchengladbach	5–0	Bayern Munich	Mönchengladbach
20:45 CEST (UTC+2)	Koné 2'; Bensebaini 15', 21' (pen.); Embolo 51', 58'; Zakaria (yellow card) 79'	Report	Upamecano (yellow card) 46'	Stadium: Borussia-Park; Attendance: 48,500; Referee: Tobias Stieler

=== DFL-Supercup ===
17 August 2021 Final	Borussia Dortmund	1–3	Bayern Munich	Dortmund
20:30 CEST (UTC+2)	Reus (yellow card) 25', (goal) 64'; Dahoud (yellow card) 32'	Report	Süle (yellow card) 23'; Lewandowski 41', 74'; Müller 50'; Sané (yellow card) 83'; Choupo-Moting (yellow card) 90+3'	Stadium: Signal Iduna Park; Attendance: 24,742; Referee: Sascha Stegemann

=== UEFA Champions League ===
==== Group stage ====
The draw for the group stage was held on 26 August 2021.

Pos	Team	Pld	W	D	L	GF	GA	GD	Pts	Qualification	BAY	BEN	BAR	DKV
1	(Germany) Bayern Munich	6	6	0	0	22	3	+19	18	Advance to knockout phase	—	5–2	3–0	5–0
2	(Portugal) Benfica	6	2	2	2	7	9	−2	8	Advance to knockout phase	0–4	—	3–0	2–0
3	(Spain) Barcelona	6	2	1	3	2	9	−7	7	Transfer to Europa League	0–3	0–0	—	1–0
4	(Ukraine) Dynamo Kyiv	6	0	1	5	1	11	−10	1		1–2	0–0	0–1	—

Source: UEFA
Rules for classification: Group stage tiebreakers

14 September 2021 1	Barcelona (Spain)	0–3	(Germany) Bayern Munich	Barcelona, Spain
21:00 CEST (UTC+2)	Gavi (yellow card) 82'	Report	Kimmich (yellow card) 5'; Müller 33'; Lewandowski 56', 85'; Upamecano (yellow card) 78'	Stadium: Camp Nou; Attendance: 39,737; Referee: Michael Oliver (England)

29 September 2021 2	Bayern Munich (Germany)	5–0	(Ukraine) Dynamo Kyiv	Munich, Germany
21:00 CEST (UTC+2)	Lewandowski 12' (pen.), 27'; Gnabry 68'; Sané 74'; Choupo-Moting 87'; Hernandez (yellow card) 90+1'	Report	Tymchyk (yellow card) 38'	Stadium: Allianz Arena; Attendance: 25,000; Referee: Marco Guida (Italy)

20 October 2021 3	Benfica (Portugal)	0–4	(Germany) Bayern Munich	Lisbon, Portugal
21:00 CEST (UTC+2)	Otamendi (yellow card) 45'; João Mário (yellow card) 51'	Report	Upamecano (yellow card) 56'; Hernandez (yellow card) 59'; Sané 70', 85'; Everton 80' (o.g.); Lewandowski 82'	Stadium: Estádio da Luz; Attendance: 55,201; Referee: Ovidiu Hațegan (Romania)

2 November 2021 4	Bayern Munich (Germany)	5–2	(Portugal) Benfica	Munich, Germany
21:00 CET (UTC+1)	Lewandowski 26', 61', 84', (penalty missed) 45+1'; Gnabry 32'; Sané 49'; Upamecano (yellow card) 51'; Nianzou (yellow card) 69'	Report	Morato 38'; Veríssimo (yellow card) 45'; Núñez 75'	Stadium: Allianz Arena; Attendance: 50,000; Referee: Szymon Marciniak (Poland)

23 November 2021 5	Dynamo Kyiv (Ukraine)	1–2	(Germany) Bayern Munich	Kyiv, Ukraine
19:45 EET (UTC+2)	Shaparenko (yellow card) 32'; Harmash 70'	Report	Lewandowski 14'; Coman 42'; Sarr (yellow card) 52'	Stadium: NSC Olimpiyskiy Stadium; Attendance: 28,732; Referee: Halil Umut Meler (Turkey)

8 December 2021 6	Bayern Munich (Germany)	3–0	(Spain) Barcelona	Munich, Germany
21:00 CET (UTC+1)	Müller 34'; Sané 43'; Musiala 62'; Richards (yellow card) 82'	Report	Busquets (yellow card) 3'; Araújo (yellow card) 16'	Stadium: Allianz Arena; Attendance: 0 Referee: Ovidiu Hațegan (Romania)

==== Knockout phase ====
===== Round of 16 =====
The draw for the round of 16 was held on 13 December 2021. (Note: Bayern Munich were initially drawn against Atlético Madrid.)

16 February 2022 First leg	Red Bull Salzburg (Austria)	1–1	(Germany) Bayern Munich	Salzburg, Austria
21:00 CET (UTC+1)	Adamu 21'; Köhn (yellow card) 86'	Report	Coman (yellow card) 83', (goal) 90'; Sabitzer (yellow card) 90+2'	Stadium: Stadion Wals-Siezenheim; Attendance: 29,520; Referee: Michael Oliver (England)

8 March 2022 Second leg	Bayern Munich (Germany)	7–1 (8–2 agg.)	(Austria) Red Bull Salzburg	Munich, Germany
21:00 CET (UTC+1)	Lewandowski 12' (pen.), 21' (pen.), 23'; Gnabry 31'; Müller 54', 83'; Sané 86'	Report	Kjaergaard 70'	Stadium: Allianz Arena; Attendance: 25,000; Referee: Clément Turpin (France)

===== Quarter-finals =====
The draw for the quarter-finals was held on 18 March 2022.

6 April 2022 First leg	Villarreal (Spain)	1–0	(Germany) Bayern Munich	Villarreal, Spain
21:00 CEST (UTC+2)	Danjuma 8'; Estupiñán (yellow card) 74'	Report		Stadium: Estadio de la Cerámica; Attendance: 21,626; Referee: Anthony Taylor (England)

12 April 2022 Second leg	Bayern Munich (Germany)	1–1 (1–2 agg.)	(Spain) Villarreal	Munich, Germany
21:00 CEST (UTC+2)	Lewandowski (yellow card) 33', (goal) 52'	Report	Foyth (yellow card) 59'; Chukwueze 88'; Lo Celso (yellow card) 90+1'	Stadium: Allianz Arena; Attendance: 70,000; Referee: Slavko Vinčić (Slovenia)

== Statistics ==
=== Appearances and goals ===
No.	Pos	Nat	Player	Total		Bundesliga		DFB-Pokal		DFL-Supercup		Champions League	
No.	Pos	Nat	Player	Apps	Goals	Apps	Goals	Apps	Goals	Apps	Goals	Apps	Goals
Goalkeepers
1	GK	(Germany) GER	Manuel Neuer	39	0	28	0	1	0	1	0	9	0
26	GK	(Germany) GER	Sven Ulreich	8	0	6	0	1	0	0	0	1	0
36	GK	(Germany) GER	Christian Früchtl	1	0	0+1	0	0	0	0	0	0	0
Defenders
2	DF	(France) FRA	Dayot Upamecano	38	1	25+3	1	1	0	1	0	7+1	0
3	DF	(England) ENG	Omar Richards	17	0	5+7	0	1	0	0	0	0+4	0
4	DF	(Germany) GER	Niklas Süle	38	1	19+9	1	1+1	0	1	0	6+1	0
5	DF	(France) FRA	Benjamin Pavard	36	0	24+1	0	1	0	0	0	9+1	0
19	DF	(Canada) CAN	Alphonso Davies	31	0	20+2	0	1	0	1	0	6+1	0
20	DF	(Senegal) SEN	Bouna Sarr	12	1	0+5	0	1	1	0+1	0	0+5	0
21	DF	(France) FRA	Lucas Hernandez	34	0	25	0	1	0	0	0	7+1	0
23	DF	(France) FRA	Tanguy Nianzou	22	1	6+11	1	1	0	0	0	2+2	0
44	DF	(Croatia) CRO	Josip Stanišić	17	1	6+7	1	0+1	0	1	0	0+2	0
Midfielders
6	MF	(Germany) GER	Joshua Kimmich	39	3	28	3	2	0	1	0	8	0
8	MF	(Germany) GER	Leon Goretzka	27	3	19	3	1	0	1	0	5+1	0
14	MF	(Germany) GER	Paul Wanner	4	0	0+4	0	0	0	0	0	0	0
18	MF	(Austria) AUT	Marcel Sabitzer	30	1	8+17	1	0	0	0	0	1+4	0
22	MF	(Spain) ESP	Marc Roca	13	0	4+5	0	0	0	0	0	0+4	0
24	MF	(France) FRA	Corentin Tolisso	22	3	8+7	2	1+1	1	0+1	0	3+1	0
37	MF	(United States) USA	Taylor Booth	1	0	0	0	0+1	0	0	0	0	0
Forwards
7	FW	(Germany) GER	Serge Gnabry	45	17	25+9	14	1+1	0	1	0	5+3	3
9	FW	(Poland) POL	Robert Lewandowski	46	50	34	35	1	0	1	2	10	13
10	FW	(Germany) GER	Leroy Sané	45	14	22+10	7	2	1	0+1	0	9+1	6
11	FW	(France) FRA	Kingsley Coman	32	8	16+5	6	0+1	0	1	0	8+1	2
13	FW	(Cameroon) CMR	Eric Maxim Choupo-Moting	26	9	1+19	4	1	4	0+1	0	0+4	1
25	FW	(Germany) GER	Thomas Müller	45	13	32	8	2	0	1	1	9+1	4
34	FW	(Germany) GER	Lucas Copado	1	0	0+1	0	0	0	0	0	0	0
38	FW	(Croatia) CRO	Gabriel Vidović	3	0	0+3	0	0	0	0	0	0	0
40	FW	(United States) USA	Malik Tillman	7	1	1+3	0	0+1	1	0	0	0+2	0
42	FW	(Germany) GER	Jamal Musiala	40	8	12+18	5	1	2	0+1	0	5+3	1
Players transferred out during the season
15	DF	(United States) USA	Chris Richards	2	0	0+1	0	0+1	0	0	0	0	0
17	MF	(France) FRA	Michaël Cuisance	2	1	0+1	0	0+1	1	0	0	0	0

Source: Competitions

=== Goalscorers ===
Rank	No.	Pos.	Nat.	Player	Bundesliga	DFB-Pokal	DFL-Supercup	Champions League	Total
1	9	FW	(Poland)	Robert Lewandowski	35	0	2	13	50
2	7	FW	(Germany)	Serge Gnabry	14	0	0	3	17
3	10	FW	(Germany)	Leroy Sané	7	1	0	6	14
4	25	FW	(Germany)	Thomas Müller	8	0	1	4	13
5	13	FW	(Cameroon)	Eric Maxim Choupo-Moting	4	4	0	1	9
6	11	FW	(France)	Kingsley Coman	6	0	0	2	8
7	42	FW	(Germany)	Jamal Musiala	5	2	0	1	8
8	6	MF	(Germany)	Joshua Kimmich	3	0	0	0	3
8	8	MF	(Germany)	Leon Goretzka	3	0	0	0	3
8	24	MF	(France)	Corentin Tolisso	2	1	0	0	3
11	2	DF	(France)	Dayot Upamecano	1	0	0	0	1
11	4	DF	(Germany)	Niklas Süle	1	0	0	0	1
11	17	MF	(France)	Michaël Cuisance	0	1	0	0	1
11	18	MF	(Austria)	Marcel Sabitzer	1	0	0	0	1
11	20	DF	(Senegal)	Bouna Sarr	0	1	0	0	1
11	23	DF	(France)	Tanguy Nianzou	1	0	0	0	1
11	40	FW	(United States)	Malik Tillman	0	1	0	0	1
11	44	DF	(Croatia)	Josip Stanišić	1	0	0	0	1
Own goals					5	1	0	1	7
Totals					97	12	3	31	143
