= 2022 UEFA Champions League final =

Football match in Saint-Denis, France

- Match programme cover
- Event: 2021–22 UEFA Champions League
Liverpool	Real Madrid
(England)	(Spain)
0	1
- Date: 28 May 2022
- Venue: Stade de France, Saint-Denis
- Man of the Match: Thibaut Courtois (Real Madrid)
- Referee: Clément Turpin (France)
- Attendance: 75,000
- Weather: Partly cloudy night 18 °C (64 °F); 45% humidity

The 2022 UEFA Champions League final was the final match of the 2021–22 UEFA Champions League, the 67th season of Europe's premier club football tournament organised by UEFA, and the 30th season since it was renamed from the European Champion Clubs' Cup to the UEFA Champions League. It was played at the Stade de France in Saint-Denis, France, on 28 May 2022, between English club Liverpool and Spanish club Real Madrid. It was the third time the two sides have met in the European Cup final, after 1981 and 2018, the third final held at the Stade de France, after the 2000 and 2006 finals, and the first time the same two teams have met in three finals. Real Madrid won the match 1–0 via a 59th-minute goal from Vinícius Júnior, assisted by Federico Valverde, for a record-extending 14th title, and their fifth in nine years.

This was the first final to be played in front of a full attendance since the 2019 final, as the previous two finals were affected by the COVID-19 pandemic. The final was originally scheduled to be played at the Allianz Arena in Munich. After the postponement and relocation of the 2020 final, the final hosts were shifted back a year, so the 2022 final was given to the Krestovsky Stadium in Saint Petersburg. Following the Russian invasion of Ukraine on 24 February, however, UEFA called an extraordinary meeting of the executive committee a day later, and the final was relocated to the Stade de France. Before the match, chaos descended following issues with crowd control, which led to kickoff being delayed by 36 minutes.

As winners, Real Madrid earned the right to play against the winners of the 2021–22 UEFA Europa League, Eintracht Frankfurt, in the 2022 UEFA Super Cup, and also qualified for the 2022 FIFA Club World Cup, in which they both won. While undetermined at the time of the final, its result also qualified the team for the first edition of the expanded FIFA Club World Cup in 2025 using UEFA's champions pathway (The winners of the 2021–2024 Champions Leagues), and increased Liverpool's chances of qualifying using the UEFA coefficient pathway (The top 8 clubs qualifying).

== Background ==
Liverpool played in their 10th European Cup/UEFA Champions League final. They had previously won six finals (in 1977, 1978, 1981, 1984, 2005 and 2019) and lost three (in 1985, 2007 and 2018). This was the fourth UEFA Champions League final for manager Jürgen Klopp, after his loss with Borussia Dortmund in 2013 and the Liverpool finals in 2018 and 2019 the latter of which he won. In addition to their six European Cup/UEFA Champions League titles, Liverpool also played in one European Cup Winners' Cup final, losing in 1966 against Borussia Dortmund, and in four UEFA Cup/Europa League finals, winning in 1973, 1976 and 2001 and losing in 2016. Their manager Jürgen Klopp was seeking to become the fourth consecutive German to manage a Champions League-winning club.

Real Madrid played in a record 17th European Cup/UEFA Champions League final, and the first since their win in 2018 against Liverpool. They previously won 13 finals (in 1956, 1957, 1958, 1959, 1960, 1966, 1998, 2000, 2002, 2014, 2016, 2017 and 2018) and lost three (1962, 1964 and 1981). Their manager Carlo Ancelotti reached a record fifth UEFA Champions League final as manager, winning in 2003 and 2007 and losing in 2005 while in charge of Milan, and winning the 2014 final with Real Madrid, and was seeking to become the first manager in history to win four UEFA Champions League titles and eight European trophies. Real Madrid also played in two European Cup Winners' Cup finals (losing in 1971 and 1983) and two UEFA Cup finals (winning in 1985 and 1986).

This was a record-third time that the two teams meet in the final, after the 1981 final, which was held in the Parc des Princes in Paris and in which Liverpool prevailed 1–0, and the 2018 final held at the Olimpiyskiy National Sports Complex in Kyiv, which was won 3–1 by Real Madrid. This was also the third final for Carlo Ancelotti as manager against Liverpool, after the 2005 and 2007 finals; he also lost the 1984 final as a player for Roma. This was the sixth time a Spanish side met an English team in the final of the competition, after the 1981, 2006 (won by Barcelona against Arsenal), the 2009 and 2011 finals (both won by Barcelona against Manchester United), and the 2018 final.

Besides the 1981 and 2018 finals, the two clubs had met each other six times. Liverpool won both matches in the 2008–09 UEFA Champions League round of 16 (1–0 away and 4–0 at home). The two clubs were drawn in the same group in the 2014–15 UEFA Champions League group stage, with Real Madrid winning 3–0 away and 1–0 at home. In the 2020–21 quarter-finals, the Spanish side won 3–1 at home and held a 0–0 draw at Anfield to ensure progression to the semi-finals.

=== Previous finals ===
In the following table, finals until 1992 were in the European Cup era, since 1993 were in the UEFA Champions League era.

Team	Previous final appearances (bold indicates winners)
(England) Liverpool	9 (**1977**, **1978**, **1981**, **1984**, 1985, **2005**, 2007, 2018, **2019**)
(Spain) Real Madrid	16 (**1956**, **1957**, **1958**, **1959**, **1960**, 1962, 1964, **1966**, 1981, **1998**, **2000**, **2002**, **2014**, **2016**, **2017**, **2018**)

== Venue ==
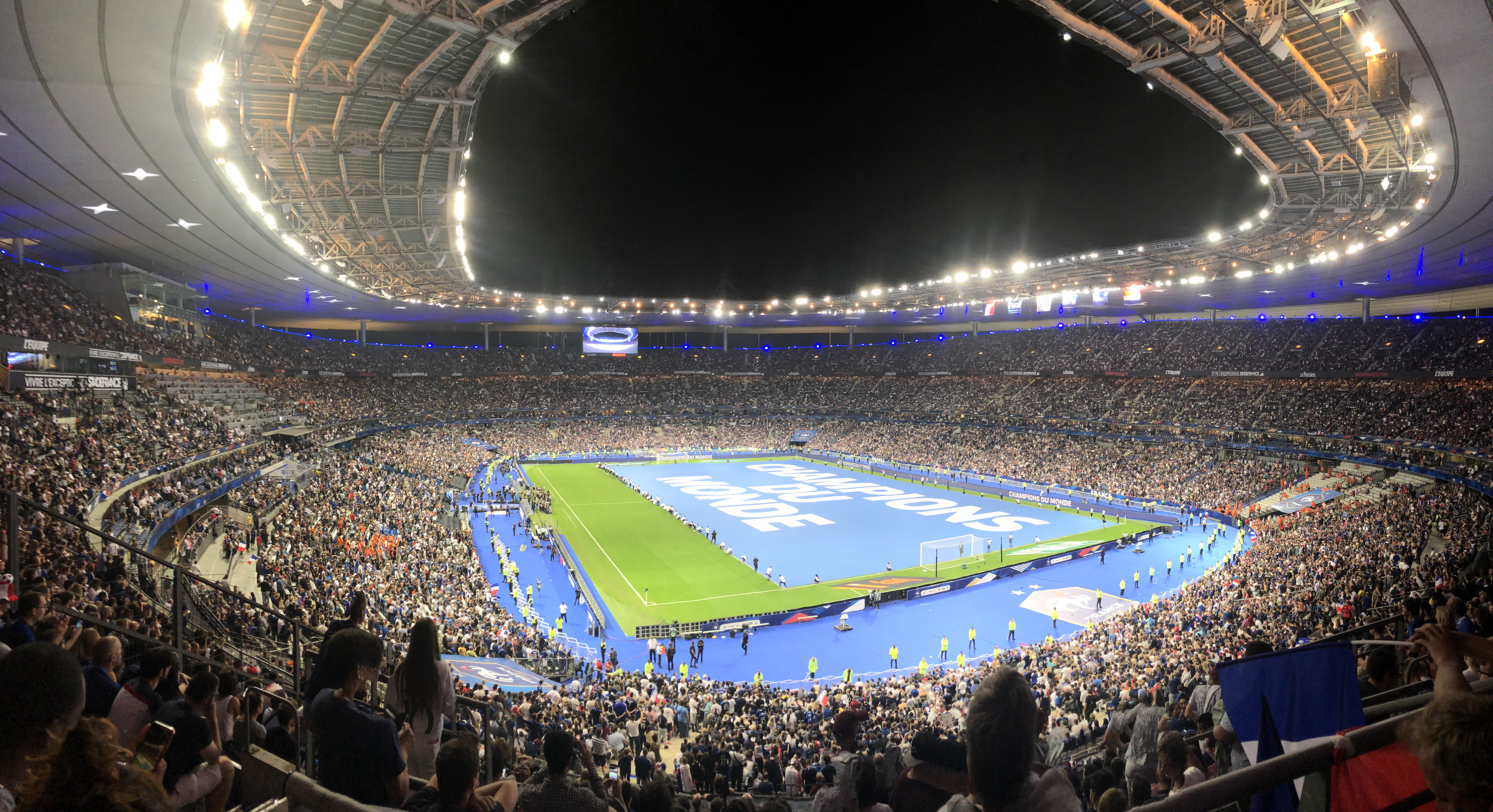
The Stade de France in Saint-Denis hosted the final.

The final was originally awarded to the Allianz Arena in Munich, Germany. When the COVID-19 pandemic forced the 2020 final to be relocated from the Atatürk Olympic Stadium in Istanbul to the Estádio da Luz in Lisbon, the Allianz Arena was reawarded with the 2023 final and the 2022 final was given to the original host of the 2021 final, the Krestovsky Stadium in Saint Petersburg.

Following the Russian invasion of Ukraine in February 2022, UEFA organised an emergency meeting of its executive committee on 25 February, at which it decided to move the final to the Stade de France in Saint-Denis. Other cities proposed as replacement hosts were Amsterdam, Barcelona, Munich and Rome. This was the first UEFA Champions League final to take place in France since 2006, where Barcelona secured their second title by defeating Arsenal 2–1.

=== Host selection ===
An open bidding process was launched on 28 September 2018 by UEFA to select the venues of the finals of the UEFA Champions League, UEFA Europa League, and UEFA Women's Champions League in 2021. Associations had until 26 October 2018 to express interest, and bid dossiers must be submitted by 15 February 2019. UEFA announced on 1 November 2018 that two associations had expressed interest in hosting the 2021 UEFA Champions League final, and on 22 February 2019 that both associations submitted their dossiers by the deadline.

Bidding associations for final
Association	Stadium	City	Capacity
Germany	Allianz Arena	Munich	70,000
Russia	Krestovsky Stadium	Saint Petersburg	67,800

The Krestovsky Stadium was selected by the UEFA Executive Committee during their meeting in Ljubljana, Slovenia on 24 September 2019, where the hosts for the 2021 and 2023 UEFA Champions League finals were also appointed.

On 17 June 2020, the UEFA Executive Committee announced that due to the postponement and relocation of the 2020 final caused by the COVID-19 pandemic in Europe, Saint Petersburg would instead host the 2022 final.

== Route to the final ==
Note: In all results below, the score of the finalist is given first (H: home; A: away).

(England) Liverpool				Round	(Spain) Real Madrid			
Opponent	Result			Group stage	Opponent	Result		
(Italy) Milan	3–2 (H)			Matchday 1	(Italy) Inter Milan	1–0 (A)		
(Portugal) Porto	5–1 (A)			Matchday 2	(Moldova) Sheriff Tiraspol	1–2 (H)		
(Spain) Atlético Madrid	3–2 (A)			Matchday 3	(Ukraine) Shakhtar Donetsk	5–0 (A)		
(Spain) Atlético Madrid	2–0 (H)			Matchday 4	(Ukraine) Shakhtar Donetsk	2–1 (H)		
(Portugal) Porto	2–0 (H)			Matchday 5	(Moldova) Sheriff Tiraspol	3–0 (A)		
(Italy) Milan	2–1 (A)			Matchday 6	(Italy) Inter Milan	2–0 (H)		
Group B winners: Pos / Team / Pld / Pts; 1 / (England) Liverpool / 6 / 18; 2 / (Spain) Atlético Madrid / 6 / 7; 3 / (Portugal) Porto / 6 / 5; 4 / (Italy) Milan / 6 / 4; Source: UEFA				Final standings	Group D winners: Pos / Team / Pld / Pts; 1 / (Spain) Real Madrid / 6 / 15; 2 / (Italy) Inter Milan / 6 / 10; 3 / (Moldova) Sheriff Tiraspol / 6 / 7; 4 / (Ukraine) Shakhtar Donetsk / 6 / 2; Source: UEFA			
Opponent	Agg.	1st leg	2nd leg	Knockout phase	Opponent	Agg.	1st leg	2nd leg
(Italy) Inter Milan	2–1	2–0 (A)	0–1 (H)	Round of 16	(France) Paris Saint-Germain	3–2	0–1 (A)	3–1 (H)
(Portugal) Benfica	6–4	3–1 (A)	3–3 (H)	Quarter-finals	(England) Chelsea	5–4	3–1 (A)	2–3 (a.e.t.) (H)
(Spain) Villarreal	5–2	2–0 (H)	3–2 (A)	Semi-finals	(England) Manchester City	6–5	3–4 (A)	3–1 (a.e.t.) (H)

== Pre-match ==
=== Identity ===
The original logo of the 2022 UEFA Champions League final at Saint Petersburg was unveiled at the group stage draw on 26 August 2021 in Istanbul. Originally, former Russian forward Andrey Arshavin was chosen to be the ambassador for the final. However, he was removed after the final's relocation to Saint-Denis.

=== Officials ===
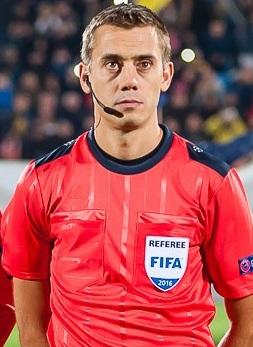
Frenchman Clément Turpin officiated the final.

On 11 May 2022, UEFA named Frenchman Clément Turpin as the referee for the final. Turpin had been a FIFA referee since 2010, and was previously the fourth official in the 2018 UEFA Champions League final, also between Real Madrid and Liverpool. In the previous season he was the referee for the 2021 UEFA Europa League Final between Villarreal and Manchester United. He officiated eight prior matches in the 2021–22 Champions League season, with two matches in qualification, four in the group stage and two knockout fixtures. He served as a referee at the UEFA European Championship in 2016 and 2020, as well as at the 2018 FIFA World Cup in Russia. Turpin also was a video assistant referee at the 2017 FIFA Confederations Cup in Russia (including in the final), the 2017 FIFA Club World Cup in the United Arab Emirates and the 2019 FIFA Women's World Cup in France

Turpin was joined by five of his fellow countrymen, including assistant referees Nicolas Danos and Cyril Gringore. Benoît Bastien served as the fourth official. Jérôme Brisard acted as the video assistant referee (VAR), with Willy Delajod appointed as one of the assistant VAR officials, along with Italian referees Massimiliano Irrati and Filippo Meli.

=== Opening ceremony ===
Cuban-born American singer Camila Cabello performed for the opening ceremony before the start of the match. Cabello performed her songs "Señorita", "La Buena Vida", "Havana", "Bam Bam" and "Don't Go Yet".

=== Issues entering stadium and match delay ===
Crowd control descended into chaos at the entrances to the Stade de France prior to the beginning of the match. By 21:00 local time, the originally scheduled kick-off time, thousands of seats remained empty in the Liverpool end. Ostensibly for security reasons, the kick-off was initially delayed by 15 minutes to 21:15. This was further delayed by 15 minutes to 21:30, before being pushed back another six minutes to 21:36. The match eventually started at 21:37.

France's Interior Minister at the time, Gérald Darmanin, later admitted that security arrangements for the final were wrong, and that his first public remarks – blaming Liverpool fans – were a mistake. "It was a failure because I had not foreseen. That was a mistake on my part. I was led astray by my preconceptions," he said, admitting that "The scapegoat was easy to find, and I apologise now to Liverpool supporters. They were quite right to be hurt. It was a mistake and a failure."

== Match ==
=== Summary ===
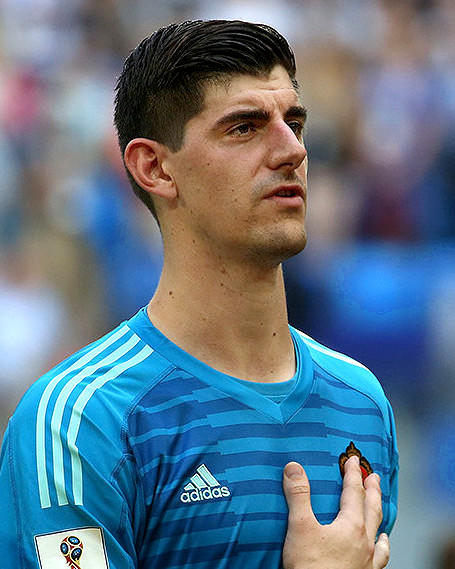
Real Madrid goalkeeper Thibaut Courtois was named man of the match after making a total of nine saves in the match.

==== First half ====
The match kicked off at the delayed time of 21:36 in front of a crowd of 75,000. In the 16th minute, Trent Alexander-Arnold played the ball across the Real Madrid penalty area which ended up being hit towards goal by Mohamed Salah before being saved by Thibaut Courtois for the first effort of the match. Five minutes later, Thiago Alcântara played a ball through to Sadio Mané who managed to make space for himself and take a shot which was saved on to the left post by Courtois. In the 34th minute, Alexander-Arnold played another cross into the Madrid penalty area towards Salah, who managed to direct a header towards goal but straight at Courtois.

Two minutes before half-time, Karim Benzema made a clear run towards the Liverpool penalty area on the right and managed to take the ball under control before attempting to pass the ball across before being cut out by Ibrahima Konaté. However, a mix up between the Liverpool defender as well as goalkeeper Alisson allowed Federico Valverde to try to step in to intercept, with Liverpool midfielder Fabinho also forced to intervene. Among the attempts to win the ball, it ended up falling to Benzema again who then passed the ball into the net. However, the goal was disallowed initially by the assistant referee and then also by the VAR after a check of three minutes and 20 seconds. Benzema was shown to be in an offside position when the ball came to him, however there was controversy as to whether the last touch off of Fabinho was intentional or not. There were three minutes of stoppage time.

==== Second half ====
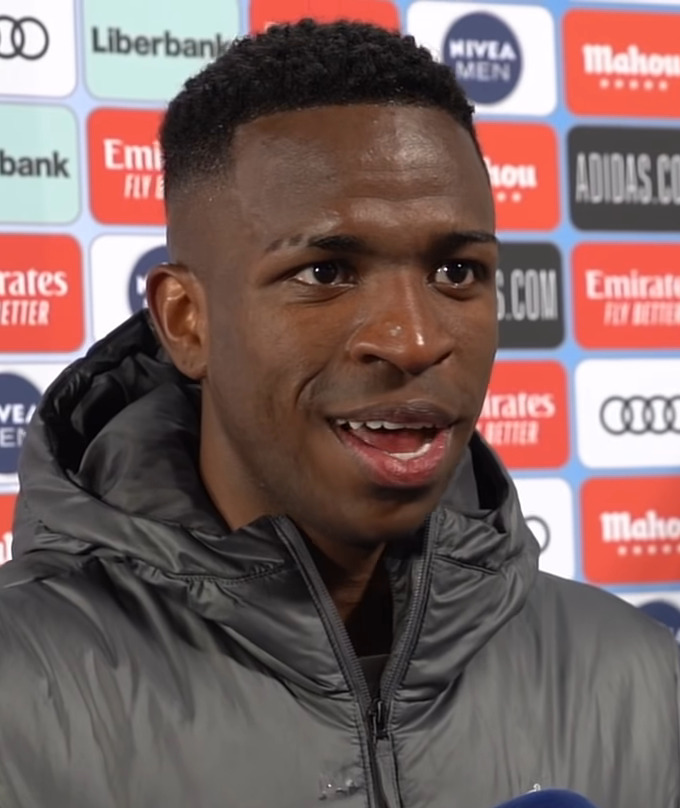
Real Madrid's Vinícius Júnior scored the lone goal of the match in the 59th minute.

Neither side made any line-up changes during the interval. Liverpool continued where they left off, as nine minutes into the second half Alexander-Arnold played in another cross towards the Real Madrid penalty area which was not far from the head of Alcântara and ended up being punched away by Courtois. In the 59th minute, Madrid took the lead against the run of play; Valverde made a run with the ball on the right hand side, before eventually playing a low cross towards Vinícius Júnior in the penalty area who managed to tuck the ball into the net to make it 1–0, having been left unmarked and Alisson left stranded on the other side of the goal.

Fabinho received the first and only booking of the night, after being shown a yellow card in the 62nd minute by referee Clément Turpin for a challenge on Valverde. With 24 minutes remaining, Liverpool pressed for an equaliser. Salah came forward with the ball and tried a shot from just outside the penalty area which ended up being saved to the right side of his goal by Courtois. Liverpool then made their first substitution of the final in the 65th minute, as Luis Díaz came off for Diogo Jota. Liverpool pushed again for a goal as a header across the face of goal by Jota almost found its way towards Salah, but was blocked off by Courtois. Madrid then had a chance to score another in the 75th minute, as a free kick into the Liverpool penalty area by Toni Kroos found its way to Casemiro who then tried to play the ball across towards Benzema and Vinícius, but was collected by Andrew Robertson.

Liverpool then made their two more changes, as Alcântara and captain Jordan Henderson came off for Naby Keïta and Roberto Firmino in the 77th minute. Liverpool continued to push for the equaliser, as passing took place between Salah and Firmino before Salah took another shot from just outside the penalty area which ended up being deflected off of Jota and carefully beaten away by Courtois down his bottom left. Salah came forward again with eight minutes left, as a ball over the top from Fabinho found its way to the Egyptian who tried to battle off Ferland Mendy before coming across and having his resulting effort be saved by Courtois. Madrid made their first change of the match in the 86th minute, as Valverde came off for Eduardo Camavinga. At the end of regular time, the fourth official displayed that a minimum of five minutes of stoppage time would be played. Madrid made their two other substitutions in stoppage time, as Dani Ceballos came on for Luka Modrić in the 90th minute and goalscorer Vinícius was brought off in the 93rd minute for Rodrygo. Despite Liverpool's continued pushes for a goal in the final moments, the match was brought to an end with Madrid winning 1–0.

=== Details ===
The home team (for administrative purposes) was determined by an additional draw held after the quarter-final and semi-final draws.

28 May 2022
21:36 UTC+2 (Note: The final, originally scheduled for 21:00, was delayed 36 minutes due to security issues with fans entering the stadium.)

Liverpool (England)	0–1	(Spain) Real Madrid
	Report	Vinícius 59'

Stade de France, Saint-Denis
Attendance: 75,000
Referee: Clément Turpin (France)

Liverpool	Real Madrid

GK	1	(Brazil) Alisson
RB	66	(England) Trent Alexander-Arnold
CB	5	(France) Ibrahima Konaté
CB	4	(Netherlands) Virgil van Dijk
LB	26	(Scotland) Andrew Robertson
CM	14	(England) Jordan Henderson (c)		(substituted off) 77'
CM	3	(Brazil) Fabinho	(yellow card) 62'
CM	6	(Spain) Thiago Alcântara		(substituted off) 77'
RF	11	(Egypt) Mohamed Salah
CF	10	(Senegal) Sadio Mané
LF	23	(Colombia) Luis Díaz		(substituted off) 65'
Substitutes:
GK	62	(Republic of Ireland) Caoimhín Kelleher
DF	12	(England) Joe Gomez
DF	21	(Greece) Kostas Tsimikas
DF	32	(Cameroon) Joël Matip
MF	7	(England) James Milner
MF	8	(Guinea) Naby Keïta		(substituted on) 77'
MF	15	(England) Alex Oxlade-Chamberlain
MF	17	(England) Curtis Jones
MF	67	(England) Harvey Elliott
FW	9	(Brazil) Roberto Firmino		(substituted on) 77'
FW	18	(Japan) Takumi Minamino
FW	20	(Portugal) Diogo Jota		(substituted on) 65'
Manager:
(Germany) Jürgen Klopp

GK	1	(Belgium) Thibaut Courtois
RB	2	(Spain) Dani Carvajal
CB	3	(Brazil) Éder Militão
CB	4	(Austria) David Alaba
LB	23	(France) Ferland Mendy
CM	10	(Croatia) Luka Modrić	(substituted off) 90'
CM	14	(Brazil) Casemiro
CM	8	(Germany) Toni Kroos
RF	15	(Uruguay) Federico Valverde	(substituted off) 86'
CF	9	(France) Karim Benzema (c)
LF	20	(Brazil) Vinícius Júnior	(substituted off) 90+3'
Substitutes:
GK	13	(Ukraine) Andriy Lunin
DF	6	(Spain) Nacho
DF	12	(Brazil) Marcelo
MF	17	(Spain) Lucas Vázquez
MF	19	(Spain) Dani Ceballos	(substituted on) 90'
MF	22	(Spain) Isco
MF	25	(France) Eduardo Camavinga	(substituted on) 86'
FW	7	(Belgium) Eden Hazard
FW	11	(Spain) Marco Asensio
FW	18	(Wales) Gareth Bale
FW	21	(Brazil) Rodrygo	(substituted on) 90+3'
FW	24	(Dominican Republic) Mariano
Manager:
(Italy) Carlo Ancelotti

Man of the Match:
Thibaut Courtois (Real Madrid)

Assistant referees:
Nicolas Danos (France)
Cyril Gringore (France)
Fourth official:
Benoît Bastien (France)
Video assistant referee:
Jérôme Brisard (France)
Assistant video assistant referees:
Willy Delajod (France)
Massimiliano Irrati (Italy)
Filippo Meli (Italy)

Match rules

- 90 minutes
- 30 minutes of extra time if necessary
- Penalty shoot-out if scores still level
- Twelve named substitutes
- Maximum of five substitutions, with a sixth allowed in extra time (Note: Each team was given only three opportunities to make substitutions, with a fourth opportunity in extra time, excluding substitutions made at half-time, before the start of extra time and at half-time in extra time.)

=== Statistics ===
First half
Statistic	Liverpool	Real Madrid
Goals scored	0	0
Total shots	10	1
Shots on target	5	0
Saves	0	5
Ball possession	47%	53%
Corner kicks	1	1
Fouls committed	5	4
Offsides	0	1
Yellow cards	0	0
Red cards	0	0

Second half
Statistic	Liverpool	Real Madrid
Goals scored	0	1
Total shots	13	2
Shots on target	4	1
Saves	0	4
Ball possession	53%	47%
Corner kicks	5	1
Fouls committed	8	3
Offsides	1	3
Yellow cards	1	0
Red cards	0	0

Overall
Statistic	Liverpool	Real Madrid
Goals scored	0	1
Total shots	23	3
Shots on target	9	1
Saves	0	9
Ball possession	50%	50%
Corner kicks	6	2
Fouls committed	13	7
Offsides	1	4
Yellow cards	1	0
Red cards	0	0

== Post-match ==
With their win, Real Madrid secured a record-extending 14th title in the European Cup/Champions League. The club has won twice as many titles as the next-best team, Milan (7 titles). This was Madrid's fifth title in nine seasons (since 2013–14), their eighth consecutive win in a Champions League final, and their tenth successive victory in a major European final (including the 1985 and 1986 UEFA Cup Finals). Real Madrid has not lost a final in the Champions League era, with their last defeat occurring in 1981. Real Madrid also claimed their fourth European double (after 1956–57, 1957–58 and 2016–17). With the win, Spanish teams extended their streak of 17 straight major European finals won against non-Spanish opposition. Real Madrid goalkeeper Thibaut Courtois was selected as the man of the match, having made nine saves in the game, a record in the final since Opta began keeping records in 2003–04. His 59 saves during the campaign also set a new Champions League single-season record since Opta began keeping records.

Carlo Ancelotti became the first manager to win four Champions League titles, having previously won the 2003 and 2007 tournaments with Milan, and the 2014 title with Madrid. Conversely, Jürgen Klopp tied Marcello Lippi for most losses in Champions League finals. Klopp had previously lost with Borussia Dortmund in 2013 and Liverpool in 2018. Nine players secured their fifth Champions League title with the win, with eight (Gareth Bale, Karim Benzema, Dani Carvajal, Casemiro, Isco, Marcelo, Luka Modrić and Nacho) doing so with Real Madrid's wins in 2014 and from 2016 to 2018. Toni Kroos won his first title with Bayern Munich in 2013, before winning with Real Madrid from 2016 to 2018. They joined former Real Madrid player Cristiano Ronaldo as the only players to have won five titles in the Champions League era.

=== Subsequent meetings ===
The two teams would meet again in the next edition of the Champions League, in the round of 16. In the first leg at Anfield, Liverpool took a 2–0 lead within 14 minutes through a backheel goal from summer signing Darwin Núñez, before Mohamed Salah capitalised on a slip from Real Madrid goalkeeper Thibaut Courtois. However, they could not hold on to it and lost 5–2 thanks to two goals from the previous final's match-winner Vinícius Júnior and Karim Benzema, and one from Éder Militão. In the second leg at the Santiago Bernabéu Stadium, Benzema scored the only goal of the match to give Real Madrid a 1–0 win, 6–2 on aggregate.

The two would then meet at Anfield in the 2024–25 UEFA Champions League league phase. This time, Liverpool were under the management of Arne Slot, following Jürgen Klopp's decision to leave the club at the end of the 2023–24 season. Meanwhile, Real Madrid were the holders of the competition, having won a record-extending 15th European Cup/Champions League, in a similar case to their meeting in 2023. Liverpool won the match 2–0, through goals from Alexis Mac Allister and Cody Gakpo. Both sides saw missed penalties; Real Madrid's Kylian Mbappé saw his penalty saved by Caoimhin Kelleher, before Liverpool's Mohamed Salah sent his effort just wide.

The teams met once again in the 2025–26 UEFA Champions League league phase at Anfield where Liverpool managed a 1-0 win thanks to a headed goal from Alexis Mac Allister from a Dominik Szoboszlai free kick.

== See also ==
- 1981 European Cup final – contested by same teams
- 2018 UEFA Champions League final – contested by same teams
- 2022 UEFA Europa League final
- 2022 UEFA Europa Conference League final
- 2022 UEFA Women's Champions League final
- 2021–22 Liverpool F.C. season
- 2021–22 Real Madrid CF season
- Liverpool F.C. in international football
- Real Madrid CF in international football
- 2022 champions league final chaos
