= 2021–22 UEFA Champions League knockout phase =

Europe premier club football tournament

The 2021–22 UEFA Champions League knockout phase began on 15 February with the round of 16 and ended on 28 May 2022 with the final at the Stade de France in Saint-Denis, France, to decide the champions of the 2021–22 UEFA Champions League. A total of 16 teams competed in the knockout phase.

Times are CET/CEST, (Note: CET (UTC+1) for dates up to 26 March 2021 (round of 16), and CEST (UTC+2) for dates thereafter (quarter-finals, semi-finals and final).) as listed by UEFA (local times, if different, are in parentheses).

== Qualified teams ==
The knockout phase involved the 16 teams which qualified as winners and runners-up of each of the eight groups in the group stage.

Group	Winners (seeded in round of 16 draw)	Runners-up (unseeded in round of 16 draw)
A	(England) Manchester City	(France) Paris Saint-Germain
B	(England) Liverpool	(Spain) Atlético Madrid
C	(Netherlands) Ajax	(Portugal) Sporting CP
D	(Spain) Real Madrid	(Italy) Inter Milan
E	(Germany) Bayern Munich	(Portugal) Benfica
F	(England) Manchester United	(Spain) Villarreal
G	(France) Lille	(Austria) Red Bull Salzburg
H	(Italy) Juventus	(England) Chelsea

== Format ==
Each tie in the knockout phase, apart from the final, was played over two legs, with each team playing one leg at home. The team that scored more goals on aggregate over the two legs advanced to the next round. If the aggregate score was level, then 30 minutes of extra time were played (the away goals rule was not applied). If the score was still level at the end of extra time, the winners were decided by a penalty shoot-out. In the final, which was played as a single match, if the score was level at the end of normal time, extra time was played, followed by a penalty shoot-out if the score was still level. The mechanism of the draws for each round was as follows:

- In the draw for the round of 16, the eight group winners were seeded, and the eight group runners-up were unseeded. The seeded teams were drawn against the unseeded teams, with the seeded teams hosting the second leg. Teams from the same group or the same association could not be drawn against each other.
- In the draws for the quarter-finals onwards, there were no seedings, and teams from the same group or the same association could be drawn against each other. As the draws for the quarter-finals onwards were held together before the quarter-finals were played, the identity of the quarter-final winners was not known at the time of the semi-final draw. A draw was also held to determine which semi-final winner was designated as the "home" team for the final (for administrative purposes as it was played at a neutral venue).

== Schedule ==
The schedule was as follows (all draws were held at the UEFA headquarters in Nyon, Switzerland).

Round	Draw date	First leg	Second leg
Round of 16	13 December 2021, 15:00	15–16 & 22–23 February 2022	8–9 & 15–16 March 2022
Quarter-finals	18 March 2022, 12:00	5–6 April 2022	12–13 April 2022
Semi-finals	18 March 2022, 12:00	26–27 April 2022	3–4 May 2022
Final	18 March 2022, 12:00	28 May 2022 at Stade de France, Saint-Denis	

== Bracket ==
Round of 16
(Portugal) Benfica	2	1	3
(Netherlands) Ajax	2	0	2
(Italy) Inter Milan	0	1	1
(England) Liverpool	2	0	2
(Spain) Villarreal	1	3	4
(Italy) Juventus	1	0	1
(Austria) Red Bull Salzburg	1	1	2
(Germany) Bayern Munich	1	7	8
(Portugal) Sporting CP	0	0	0
(England) Manchester City	5	0	5
(Spain) Atlético Madrid	1	1	2
(England) Manchester United	1	0	1
(England) Chelsea	2	2	4
(France) Lille	0	1	1
(France) Paris Saint-Germain	1	1	2
(Spain) Real Madrid	0	3	3

Quarter-finals
(Portugal) Benfica	1	3	4
(England) Liverpool	3	3	6
(Spain) Villarreal	1	1	2
(Germany) Bayern Munich	0	1	1
(England) Manchester City	1	0	1
(Spain) Atlético Madrid	0	0	0
(England) Chelsea	1	3	4
(Spain) Real Madrid (a.e.t.)	3	2	5

Semi-finals
(England) Liverpool	2	3	5
(Spain) Villarreal	0	2	2
(England) Manchester City	4	1	5
(Spain) Real Madrid (a.e.t.)	3	3	6

Final
28 May – Saint-Denis
(England) Liverpool	0
(Spain) Real Madrid	1

== Round of 16 ==
The draw for the round of 16 was held on 13 December 2021, originally at 12:00 CET. The draw featured multiple irregularities: Manchester United were mistakenly included in the draw for Villarreal's opponent (both were in Group F), and subsequently were selected; another ball was then drawn, with Manchester City chosen instead. In the following tie, Liverpool were mistakenly included in the draw for Atlético Madrid's opponent (both were in Group B), while Manchester United were incorrectly excluded. Later that day, UEFA voided the original draw due to a "technical problem" with the draw computer, and it was entirely redone at 15:00 CET.

The round of 16 ties were initially drawn (and later voided) as follows:

- Benfica – Real Madrid
- Villarreal – Manchester City
- Atlético Madrid – Bayern Munich
- Red Bull Salzburg – Liverpool
- Inter Milan – Ajax
- Sporting CP – Juventus
- Chelsea – Lille
- Paris Saint-Germain – Manchester United

=== Summary ===
The first legs were played on 15, 16, 22 and 23 February, and the second legs were played on 8, 9, 15 and 16 March 2022.

Team 1	Agg.	Team 2	1st leg	2nd leg
Red Bull Salzburg (Austria)	2–8	(Germany) Bayern Munich	1–1	1–7
Sporting CP (Portugal)	0–5	(England) Manchester City	0–5	0–0
Benfica (Portugal)	3–2	(Netherlands) Ajax	2–2	1–0
Chelsea (England)	4–1	(France) Lille	2–0	2–1
Atlético Madrid (Spain)	2–1	(England) Manchester United	1–1	1–0
Villarreal (Spain)	4–1	(Italy) Juventus	1–1	3–0
Inter Milan (Italy)	1–2	(England) Liverpool	0–2	1–0
Paris Saint-Germain (France)	2–3	(Spain) Real Madrid	1–0	1–3

=== Matches ===
16 February 2022
21:00

Red Bull Salzburg (Austria)	1–1	(Germany) Bayern Munich
Adamu 21'	Report	Coman 90'

Stadion Wals-Siezenheim, Salzburg
Attendance: 29,520
Referee: Michael Oliver (England)
8 March 2022
21:00

Bayern Munich (Germany)	7–1	(Austria) Red Bull Salzburg
Lewandowski 12' (pen.), 21' (pen.), 23'; Gnabry 31'; Müller 54', 83'; Sané 85'	Report	Kjærgaard 70'

Allianz Arena, Munich
Attendance: 25,000
Referee: Clément Turpin (France)

Bayern Munich won 8–2 on aggregate.

15 February 2022
21:00 (20:00 UTC+0)

Sporting CP (Portugal)	0–5	(England) Manchester City
	Report	Mahrez 7'; Silva 17', 44'; Foden 32'; Sterling 58'

Estádio José Alvalade, Lisbon
Attendance: 48,129
Referee: Srđan Jovanović (Serbia)
9 March 2022
21:00 (20:00 UTC+0)

Manchester City (England)	0–0	(Portugal) Sporting CP
	Report

City of Manchester Stadium, Manchester
Attendance: 51,213
Referee: Halil Umut Meler (Turkey)

Manchester City won 5–0 on aggregate.

23 February 2022
21:00 (20:00 UTC+0)

Benfica (Portugal)	2–2	(Netherlands) Ajax
Haller 26' (o.g.); Yaremchuk 72'	Report	Tadić 18'; Haller 29'

Estádio da Luz, Lisbon
Attendance: 54,760
Referee: Slavko Vinčić (Slovenia)
15 March 2022
21:00

Ajax (Netherlands)	0–1	(Portugal) Benfica
	Report	Núñez 77'

Johan Cruyff Arena, Amsterdam
Attendance: 54,066
Referee: Carlos del Cerro Grande (Spain)

Benfica won 3–2 on aggregate.

22 February 2022
21:00 (20:00 UTC+0)

Chelsea (England)	2–0	(France) Lille
Havertz 8'; Pulisic 63'	Report

Stamford Bridge, London
Attendance: 38,832
Referee: Jesús Gil Manzano (Spain)
16 March 2022
21:00

Lille (France)	1–2	(England) Chelsea
Yılmaz 38' (pen.)	Report	Pulisic 45+3'; Azpilicueta 71'

Stade Pierre-Mauroy, Villeneuve-d'Ascq
Attendance: 49,048
Referee: Davide Massa (Italy)

Chelsea won 4–1 on aggregate.

23 February 2022
21:00

Atlético Madrid (Spain)	1–1	(England) Manchester United
Félix 7'	Report	Elanga 80'

Metropolitano Stadium, Madrid
Attendance: 63,273
Referee: Ovidiu Hațegan (Romania)
15 March 2022
21:00 (20:00 UTC+0)

Manchester United (England)	0–1	(Spain) Atlético Madrid
	Report	Lodi 41'

Old Trafford, Manchester
Attendance: 73,008
Referee: Slavko Vinčić (Slovenia)

Atlético Madrid won 2–1 on aggregate.

22 February 2022
21:00

Villarreal (Spain)	1–1	(Italy) Juventus
Parejo 66'	Report	Vlahović 1'

Estadio de la Cerámica, Villarreal
Attendance: 17,686
Referee: Daniel Siebert (Germany)
16 March 2022
21:00

Juventus (Italy)	0–3	(Spain) Villarreal
	Report	Gerard 78' (pen.); Torres 85'; Danjuma 90+2' (pen.)

Juventus Stadium, Turin
Attendance: 30,385
Referee: Szymon Marciniak (Poland)

Villarreal won 4–1 on aggregate.

16 February 2022
21:00

Inter Milan (Italy)	0–2	(England) Liverpool
	Report	Firmino 75'; Salah 83'

San Siro, Milan
Attendance: 37,918
Referee: Szymon Marciniak (Poland)
8 March 2022
21:00 (20:00 UTC+0)

Liverpool (England)	0–1	(Italy) Inter Milan
	Report	Martínez 62'

Anfield, Liverpool
Attendance: 51,747
Referee: Antonio Mateu Lahoz (Spain)

Liverpool won 2–1 on aggregate.

15 February 2022
21:00

Paris Saint-Germain (France)	1–0	(Spain) Real Madrid
Mbappé 90+4'	Report

Parc des Princes, Paris
Attendance: 47,443
Referee: Daniele Orsato (Italy)
9 March 2022
21:00

Real Madrid (Spain)	3–1	(France) Paris Saint-Germain
Benzema 61', 76', 78'	Report	Mbappé 39'

Santiago Bernabéu, Madrid
Attendance: 59,895
Referee: Danny Makkelie (Netherlands)

Real Madrid won 3–2 on aggregate.

== Quarter-finals ==
The draw for the quarter-finals was held on 18 March 2022, 12:00 CET.

=== Summary ===
The first legs were played on 5 and 6 April, and the second legs were played on 12 and 13 April 2022.

Team 1	Agg.	Team 2	1st leg	2nd leg
Chelsea (England)	4–5	(Spain) Real Madrid	1–3	3–2 (a.e.t.)
Manchester City (England)	1–0	(Spain) Atlético Madrid	1–0	0–0
Villarreal (Spain)	2–1	(Germany) Bayern Munich	1–0	1–1
Benfica (Portugal)	4–6	(England) Liverpool	1–3	3–3

=== Matches ===
6 April 2022
21:00 (20:00 UTC+1)

Chelsea (England)	1–3	(Spain) Real Madrid
Havertz 40'	Report	Benzema 21', 24', 46'

Stamford Bridge, London
Attendance: 38,689
Referee: Clément Turpin (France)
12 April 2022
21:00

Real Madrid (Spain)	2–3 (a.e.t.)	(England) Chelsea
Rodrygo 80'; Benzema 96'	Report	Mount 15'; Rüdiger 51'; Werner 75'

Santiago Bernabéu, Madrid
Attendance: 59,839
Referee: Szymon Marciniak (Poland)

Real Madrid won 5–4 on aggregate.

5 April 2022
21:00 (20:00 UTC+1)

Manchester City (England)	1–0	(Spain) Atlético Madrid
De Bruyne 70'	Report

City of Manchester Stadium, Manchester
Attendance: 52,018
Referee: István Kovács (Romania)
13 April 2022
21:00

Atlético Madrid (Spain)	0–0	(England) Manchester City
	Report

Metropolitano Stadium, Madrid
Attendance: 65,675
Referee: Daniel Siebert (Germany)

Manchester City won 1–0 on aggregate.

6 April 2022
21:00

Villarreal (Spain)	1–0	(Germany) Bayern Munich
Danjuma 8'	Report

Estadio de la Cerámica, Villarreal
Attendance: 21,626
Referee: Anthony Taylor (England)
12 April 2022
21:00

Bayern Munich (Germany)	1–1	(Spain) Villarreal
Lewandowski 52'	Report	Chukwueze 88'

Allianz Arena, Munich
Attendance: 70,000
Referee: Slavko Vinčić (Slovenia)

Villarreal won 2–1 on aggregate.

5 April 2022
21:00 (20:00 UTC+1)

Benfica (Portugal)	1–3	(England) Liverpool
Núñez 49'	Report	Konaté 17'; Mané 34'; Díaz 87'

Estádio da Luz, Lisbon
Attendance: 59,633
Referee: Jesús Gil Manzano (Spain)
13 April 2022
21:00 (20:00 UTC+1)

Liverpool (England)	3–3	(Portugal) Benfica
Konaté 21'; Firmino 55', 65'	Report	Ramos 32'; Yaremchuk 73'; Núñez 82'

Anfield, Liverpool
Attendance: 51,373
Referee: Serdar Gözübüyük (Netherlands)

Liverpool won 6–4 on aggregate.

== Semi-finals ==
The draw for the semi-finals was held on 18 March 2022, 12:00 CET, after the quarter-final draw.

=== Summary ===
The first legs were played on 26 and 27 April, and the second legs were played on 3 and 4 May 2022.

Team 1	Agg.	Team 2	1st leg	2nd leg
Manchester City (England)	5–6	(Spain) Real Madrid	4–3	1–3 (a.e.t.)
Liverpool (England)	5–2	(Spain) Villarreal	2–0	3–2

=== Matches ===
26 April 2022
21:00 (20:00 UTC+1)

Manchester City (England)	4–3	(Spain) Real Madrid
De Bruyne 2'; Gabriel Jesus 11'; Foden 53'; Silva 74'	Report	Benzema 33', 82' (pen.); Vinícius 55'

City of Manchester Stadium, Manchester
Attendance: 52,217
Referee: István Kovács (Romania)
4 May 2022
21:00

Real Madrid (Spain)	3–1 (a.e.t.)	(England) Manchester City
Rodrygo 90', 90+1'; Benzema 95' (pen.)	Report	Mahrez 73'

Santiago Bernabéu, Madrid
Attendance: 61,416
Referee: Daniele Orsato (Italy)

Real Madrid won 6–5 on aggregate.

27 April 2022
21:00 (20:00 UTC+1)

Liverpool (England)	2–0	(Spain) Villarreal
Estupiñán 53' (o.g.); Mané 55'	Report

Anfield, Liverpool
Attendance: 51,586
Referee: Szymon Marciniak (Poland)
3 May 2022
21:00

Villarreal (Spain)	2–3	(England) Liverpool
Dia 3'; Coquelin 41'	Report	Fabinho 62'; Díaz 67'; Mané 74'

Estadio de la Cerámica, Villarreal
Attendance: 23,665
Referee: Danny Makkelie (Netherlands)

Liverpool won 5–2 on aggregate.

== Final ==
The final was played on 28 May 2022 at the Stade de France in Saint-Denis. A draw was held on 18 March 2022, after the quarter-final and semi-final draws, to determine the "home" team for administrative purposes.

28 May 2022
21:36 (Note: The final, originally scheduled for 21:00, was delayed 36 minutes due to security issues with fans entering the stadium.)

Liverpool (England)	0–1	(Spain) Real Madrid
	Report	Vinícius 59'

Stade de France, Saint-Denis
Attendance: 75,000
Referee: Clément Turpin (France)
