= 2021–22 UEFA Champions League group stage =

International football competition

The 2021–22 UEFA Champions League group stage began on 14 September 2021 and ended on 9 December 2021. A total of 32 teams competed in the group stage to decide the 16 places in the knockout phase of the 2021–22 UEFA Champions League.

Sheriff Tiraspol made their debut appearance in the group stage, becoming the first team from Moldova to play in the Champions League group stage.

== Draw ==
The draw for the group stage was held on 26 August 2021, 18:00 CEST (19:00 TRT), in Istanbul, Turkey. The 32 teams were drawn into eight groups of four. For the draw, the teams were seeded into four pots, each of eight teams, based on the following principles:

- Pot 1 contained the Champions League and Europa League title holders, and the champions of the top six associations based on their 2020 UEFA country coefficients.
- Pot 2, 3, and 4 contained the remaining teams, seeded based on their 2021 UEFA club coefficients.

Teams from the same association, and due to political reasons, teams from Ukraine and Russia cannot be drawn into the same group. Prior to the draw, UEFA formed pairings of teams from the same association (one pairing for associations with two or three teams, two pairings for associations with four or five teams) based on television audiences, where one team was drawn into Groups A–D and another team was drawn into Groups E–H, so that the two teams would play on different days. The following pairings were announced by UEFA after the group stage teams were confirmed:

1. (England) Chelsea and Manchester City
2. (Spain) Atlético Madrid and Sevilla
3. (Italy) Inter Milan and Juventus
4. (Germany) Bayern Munich and Borussia Dortmund
5. (France) Lille and Paris Saint-Germain
6. (Spain) Real Madrid and Barcelona
7. (England) Manchester United and Liverpool
8. (Portugal) Porto and Benfica
9. (Ukraine) Shakhtar Donetsk and Dynamo Kyiv
10. (Germany) RB Leipzig and VfL Wolfsburg
11. (Italy) Atalanta and Milan

On each matchday, one set of four groups played their matches on Tuesday, while the other set of four groups played their matches on Wednesday, with the two sets of groups alternating between each matchday. The fixtures were decided after the draw, using a computer draw not shown to public. Each team would not play more than two home matches or two away matches in a row, and would play one home match and one away match on the first and last matchdays (Regulations Article 16.02). This arrangement was different from previous seasons, where the same two teams would play at home on the first and last matchdays.

== Teams ==
Below were the participating teams (with their 2021 UEFA club coefficients), grouped by their seeding pot. They included:

- 26 teams which entered in this stage
- 6 winners of the play-off round (4 from Champions Path, 2 from League Path)

Key to colours
Group winners and runners-up advanced to round of 16
Third-placed teams entered Europa League knockout round play-offs

Pot 1 (by association rank)
Assoc.	Team	Notes	Coeff.
—	(England) Chelsea		98.000
—	(Spain) Villarreal		63.000
1	(Spain) Atlético Madrid		115.000
2	(England) Manchester City		125.000
3	(Germany) Bayern Munich		134.000
4	(Italy) Inter Milan		53.000
5	(France) Lille		14.000
6	(Portugal) Sporting CP		45.500

Pot 2
Team	Coeff.
(Spain) Real Madrid	127.000
(Spain) Barcelona	122.000
(Italy) Juventus	120.000
(England) Manchester United	113.000
(France) Paris Saint-Germain	113.000
(England) Liverpool	101.000
(Spain) Sevilla	98.000
(Germany) Borussia Dortmund	90.000

Pot 3
Team	Notes	Coeff.
(Portugal) Porto		87.000
(Netherlands) Ajax		82.500
(Ukraine) Shakhtar Donetsk		79.000
(Germany) RB Leipzig		66.000
(Austria) Red Bull Salzburg		59.000
(Portugal) Benfica		58.000
(Italy) Atalanta		50.500
(Russia) Zenit Saint Petersburg		50.000

Pot 4
Team	Notes	Coeff.
(Turkey) Beşiktaş		49.000
(Ukraine) Dynamo Kyiv		47.000
(Belgium) Club Brugge		35.500
(Switzerland) Young Boys		35.000
(Italy) Milan		31.000
(Sweden) Malmö FF		18.500
(Germany) VfL Wolfsburg		14.714
(Moldova) Sheriff Tiraspol		14.500

Notes

1. ^{TH} Champions League title holders, automatically placed into Pot 1 as top seed.
2. ^{EL} Europa League title holders, automatically placed into Pot 1 as second top seed.
3. ^{CP} Winners of play-off round (Champions Path).
4. ^{LP} Winners of play-off round (League Path).

== Format ==
In each group, teams played against each other home-and-away in a round-robin format. The top two teams of each group advanced to the round of 16. The third-placed teams were transferred to the Europa League knockout round play-offs, while the fourth-placed teams were eliminated from European competitions for the season.

=== Tiebreakers ===
Teams were ranked according to points (3 points for a win, 1 point for a draw, 0 points for a loss). If two or more teams were tied on points, the following tiebreaking criteria were applied, in the order given, to determine the rankings (see Article 17 Equality of points – group stage, Regulations of the UEFA Champions League):

1. Points in head-to-head matches among the tied teams;
2. Goal difference in head-to-head matches among the tied teams;
3. Goals scored in head-to-head matches among the tied teams;
4. If more than two teams were tied, and after applying all head-to-head criteria above, a subset of teams were still tied, all head-to-head criteria above were reapplied exclusively to this subset of teams;
5. Goal difference in all group matches;
6. Goals scored in all group matches;
7. Away goals scored in all group matches;
8. Wins in all group matches;
9. Away wins in all group matches;
10. Disciplinary points (direct red card = 3 points; double yellow card = 3 points; single yellow card = 1 point);
11. UEFA club coefficient.

Due to the abolition of the away goals rule, head-to-head away goals were no longer applied as a tiebreaker starting from this season. However, total away goals were still applied as a tiebreaker.

== Groups ==
The fixtures were announced on 27 August 2021, the day after the draw. The matches were played on 14–15 September, 28–29 September, 19–20 October, 2–3 November, 23–24 November, and 7–8 December 2021. The scheduled kick-off times were 18:45 (two matches on each day) and 21:00 (remaining six matches) CET/CEST.

Times were CET/CEST, (Note: CEST (UTC+2) for dates up to 30 October 2021 (matchdays 1–3), and CET (UTC+1) for dates thereafter (matchdays 4–6).) as listed by UEFA (local times, if different, are in parentheses).

=== Group A ===
Pos	Team	Pld	W	D	L	GF	GA	GD	Pts	Qualification	MCI	PAR	RBL	BRU
1	(England) Manchester City	6	4	0	2	18	10	+8	12	Advance to knockout phase	—	2–1	6–3	4–1
2	(France) Paris Saint-Germain	6	3	2	1	13	8	+5	11	Advance to knockout phase	2–0	—	3–2	4–1
3	(Germany) RB Leipzig	6	2	1	3	15	14	+1	7	Transfer to Europa League	2–1	2–2	—	1–2
4	(Belgium) Club Brugge	6	1	1	4	6	20	−14	4		1–5	1–1	0–5	—

Source: UEFA
Rules for classification: Group stage tiebreakers
15 September 2021
21:00 (20:00 UTC+1)

Manchester City (England)	6–3	(Germany) RB Leipzig
Aké 16'; Mukiele 28' (o.g.); Mahrez 45+2' (pen.); Grealish 56'; Cancelo 75'; Gabriel Jesus 85'	Report	Nkunku 42', 51', 73'

City of Manchester Stadium, Manchester
Attendance: 38,062
Referee: Serdar Gözübüyük (Netherlands)
15 September 2021
21:00

Club Brugge (Belgium)	1–1	(France) Paris Saint-Germain
Vanaken 27'	Report	Herrera 15'

Jan Breydel Stadium, Bruges
Attendance: 27,546
Referee: Sandro Schärer (Switzerland)

28 September 2021
21:00

RB Leipzig (Germany)	1–2	(Belgium) Club Brugge
Nkunku 5'	Report	Vanaken 22'; Rits 40'

Red Bull Arena, Leipzig
Attendance: 23,500
Referee: Slavko Vinčić (Slovenia)
28 September 2021
21:00

Paris Saint-Germain (France)	2–0	(England) Manchester City
Gueye 8'; Messi 74'	Report

Parc des Princes, Paris
Attendance: 37,350
Referee: Carlos del Cerro Grande (Spain)

19 October 2021
18:45

Club Brugge (Belgium)	1–5	(England) Manchester City
Vanaken 81'	Report	Cancelo 30'; Mahrez 43' (pen.), 84'; Walker 53'; Palmer 67'

Jan Breydel Stadium, Bruges
Attendance: 24,915
Referee: István Kovács (Romania)
19 October 2021
21:00

Paris Saint-Germain (France)	3–2	(Germany) RB Leipzig
Mbappé 9'; Messi 67', 74' (pen.)	Report	Silva 28'; Mukiele 57'

Parc des Princes, Paris
Attendance: 47,359
Referee: Marco Guida (Italy)

3 November 2021
21:00

RB Leipzig (Germany)	2–2	(France) Paris Saint-Germain
Nkunku 8'; Szoboszlai 90+2' (pen.)	Report	Wijnaldum 21', 39'

Red Bull Arena, Leipzig
Attendance: 39,794
Referee: Andreas Ekberg (Sweden)
3 November 2021
21:00 (20:00 UTC+0)

Manchester City (England)	4–1	(Belgium) Club Brugge
Foden 15'; Mahrez 54'; Sterling 72'; Gabriel Jesus 90+2'	Report	Stones 17' (o.g.)

City of Manchester Stadium, Manchester
Attendance: 50,228
Referee: Antonio Mateu Lahoz (Spain)

24 November 2021
21:00 (20:00 UTC+0)

Manchester City (England)	2–1	(France) Paris Saint-Germain
Sterling 63'; Gabriel Jesus 76'	Report	Mbappé 50'

City of Manchester Stadium, Manchester
Attendance: 52,030
Referee: Daniele Orsato (Italy)
24 November 2021
21:00

Club Brugge (Belgium)	0–5	(Germany) RB Leipzig
	Report	Nkunku 12', 90+3'; Forsberg 17' (pen.), 45+1'; Silva 26'

Jan Breydel Stadium, Bruges
Attendance: 24,072
Referee: Davide Massa (Italy)

7 December 2021
18:45

RB Leipzig (Germany)	2–1	(England) Manchester City
Szoboszlai 24'; Silva 71'	Report	Mahrez 76'

Red Bull Arena, Leipzig
Attendance: 0 (Note: Due to the COVID-19 pandemic in Europe, the match was played behind closed doors.)
Referee: Sandro Schärer (Switzerland)
7 December 2021
18:45

Paris Saint-Germain (France)	4–1	(Belgium) Club Brugge
Mbappé 2', 7'; Messi 38', 76' (pen.)	Report	Rits 68'

Parc des Princes, Paris
Attendance: 47,492
Referee: Jesús Gil Manzano (Spain)

=== Group B ===
Pos	Team	Pld	W	D	L	GF	GA	GD	Pts	Qualification	LIV	ATM	POR	MIL
1	(England) Liverpool	6	6	0	0	17	6	+11	18	Advance to knockout phase	—	2–0	2–0	3–2
2	(Spain) Atlético Madrid	6	2	1	3	7	8	−1	7	Advance to knockout phase	2–3	—	0–0	0–1
3	(Portugal) Porto	6	1	2	3	4	11	−7	5	Transfer to Europa League	1–5	1–3	—	1–0
4	(Italy) Milan	6	1	1	4	6	9	−3	4		1–2	1–2	1–1	—

Source: UEFA
Rules for classification: Group stage tiebreakers
15 September 2021
21:00 (20:00 UTC+1)

Liverpool (England)	3–2	(Italy) Milan
Tomori 9' (o.g.); Salah 49'; Henderson 69'	Report	Rebić 42'; Brahim 44'

Anfield, Liverpool
Attendance: 51,445
Referee: Szymon Marciniak (Poland)
15 September 2021
21:00

Atlético Madrid (Spain)	0–0	(Portugal) Porto
	Report

Wanda Metropolitano Stadium, Madrid
Attendance: 40,098
Referee: Ovidiu Hațegan (Romania)

28 September 2021
21:00

Milan (Italy)	1–2	(Spain) Atlético Madrid
Leão 20'	Report	Griezmann 84'; Suárez 90+7' (pen.)

San Siro, Milan
Attendance: 35,374
Referee: Cüneyt Çakır (Turkey)
28 September 2021
21:00 (20:00 UTC+1)

Porto (Portugal)	1–5	(England) Liverpool
Taremi 75'	Report	Salah 18', 60'; Mané 45'; Firmino 77', 81'

Estádio do Dragão, Porto
Attendance: 23,520
Referee: Sergei Karasev (Russia)

19 October 2021
21:00

Atlético Madrid (Spain)	2–3	(England) Liverpool
Griezmann 20', 34'	Report	Salah 8', 78' (pen.); Keïta 13'

Wanda Metropolitano Stadium, Madrid
Attendance: 60,725
Referee: Daniel Siebert (Germany)
19 October 2021
21:00 (20:00 UTC+1)

Porto (Portugal)	1–0	(Italy) Milan
Díaz 65'	Report

Estádio do Dragão, Porto
Attendance: 32,130
Referee: Felix Brych (Germany)

3 November 2021
18:45

Milan (Italy)	1–1	(Portugal) Porto
Mbemba 61' (o.g.)	Report	Díaz 6'

San Siro, Milan
Attendance: 39,675
Referee: Clément Turpin (France)
3 November 2021
21:00 (20:00 UTC+0)

Liverpool (England)	2–0	(Spain) Atlético Madrid
Jota 13'; Mané 21'	Report

Anfield, Liverpool
Attendance: 51,347
Referee: Danny Makkelie (Netherlands)

24 November 2021
21:00 (20:00 UTC+0)

Liverpool (England)	2–0	(Portugal) Porto
Thiago 52'; Salah 70'	Report

Anfield, Liverpool
Attendance: 52,209
Referee: Felix Zwayer (Germany)
24 November 2021
21:00

Atlético Madrid (Spain)	0–1	(Italy) Milan
	Report	Messias 87'

Wanda Metropolitano Stadium, Madrid
Attendance: 61,019
Referee: Slavko Vinčić (Slovenia)

7 December 2021
21:00 (20:00 UTC+0)

Porto (Portugal)	1–3	(Spain) Atlético Madrid
Oliveira 90+6' (pen.)	Report	Griezmann 56'; Correa 90'; De Paul 90+2'

Estádio do Dragão, Porto
Attendance: 38,830
Referee: Clément Turpin (France)
7 December 2021
21:00

Milan (Italy)	1–2	(England) Liverpool
Tomori 29'	Report	Salah 36'; Origi 55'

San Siro, Milan
Attendance: 56,237
Referee: Danny Makkelie (Netherlands)

=== Group C ===
Pos	Team	Pld	W	D	L	GF	GA	GD	Pts	Qualification	AJX	SPO	DOR	BES
1	(Netherlands) Ajax	6	6	0	0	20	5	+15	18	Advance to knockout phase	—	4–2	4–0	2–0
2	(Portugal) Sporting CP	6	3	0	3	14	12	+2	9 (Note: Tied on head-to-head points. Head-to-head goal difference: Sporting CP +1, Borussia Dortmund −1.)	Advance to knockout phase	1–5	—	3–1	4–0
3	(Germany) Borussia Dortmund	6	3	0	3	10	11	−1	9	Transfer to Europa League	1–3	1–0	—	5–0
4	(Turkey) Beşiktaş	6	0	0	6	3	19	−16	0		1–2	1–4	1–2	—

Source: UEFA
Rules for classification: Group stage tiebreakers
Notes:
15 September 2021
18:45 (19:45 UTC+3)

Beşiktaş (Turkey)	1–2	(Germany) Borussia Dortmund
Montero 90+4'	Report	Bellingham 20'; Haaland 45+3'

Vodafone Park, Istanbul
Attendance: 22,445
Referee: Antonio Mateu Lahoz (Spain)
15 September 2021
21:00 (20:00 UTC+1)

Sporting CP (Portugal)	1–5	(Netherlands) Ajax
Paulinho 33'	Report	Haller 2', 9', 51', 63'; Berghuis 39'

Estádio José Alvalade, Lisbon
Attendance: 20,382
Referee: José María Sánchez Martínez (Spain)

28 September 2021
18:45

Ajax (Netherlands)	2–0	(Turkey) Beşiktaş
Berghuis 17'; Haller 43'	Report

Johan Cruyff Arena, Amsterdam
Attendance: 52,628
Referee: Benoît Bastien (France)
28 September 2021
21:00

Borussia Dortmund (Germany)	1–0	(Portugal) Sporting CP
Malen 37'	Report

Westfalenstadion, Dortmund
Attendance: 25,000
Referee: Srđan Jovanović (Serbia)

19 October 2021
18:45 (19:45 UTC+3)

Beşiktaş (Turkey)	1–4	(Portugal) Sporting CP
Larin 24'	Report	Coates 15', 27'; Sarabia 44' (pen.); Paulinho 89'

Vodafone Park, Istanbul
Attendance: 22,936
Referee: Slavko Vinčić (Slovenia)
19 October 2021
21:00

Ajax (Netherlands)	4–0	(Germany) Borussia Dortmund
Reus 11' (o.g.); Blind 25'; Antony 57'; Haller 72'	Report

Johan Cruyff Arena, Amsterdam
Attendance: 54,029
Referee: Jesús Gil Manzano (Spain)

3 November 2021
21:00

Borussia Dortmund (Germany)	1–3	(Netherlands) Ajax
Reus 37' (pen.)	Report	Tadić 72'; Haller 83'; Klaassen 90+3'

Westfalenstadion, Dortmund
Attendance: 54,820
Referee: Michael Oliver (England)
3 November 2021
21:00 (20:00 UTC+0)

Sporting CP (Portugal)	4–0	(Turkey) Beşiktaş
Gonçalves 31' (pen.), 38'; Paulinho 41'; Sarabia 56'	Report

Estádio José Alvalade, Lisbon
Attendance: 40,835
Referee: Sergei Karasev (Russia)

24 November 2021
18:45 (20:45 UTC+3)

Beşiktaş (Turkey)	1–2	(Netherlands) Ajax
Ghezzal 22' (pen.)	Report	Haller 54', 69'

Vodafone Park, Istanbul
Attendance: 11,712
Referee: Irfan Peljto (Bosnia and Herzegovina)
24 November 2021
21:00 (20:00 UTC+0)

Sporting CP (Portugal)	3–1	(Germany) Borussia Dortmund
Gonçalves 30', 39'; Porro 81'	Report	Malen 90+3'

Estádio José Alvalade, Lisbon
Attendance: 41,341
Referee: Carlos del Cerro Grande (Spain)

7 December 2021
21:00

Ajax (Netherlands)	4–2	(Portugal) Sporting CP
Haller 8' (pen.); Antony 42'; Neres 58'; Berghuis 62'	Report	Santos 22'; Tabata 78'

Johan Cruyff Arena, Amsterdam
Attendance: 0
Referee: Davide Massa (Italy)
7 December 2021
21:00

Borussia Dortmund (Germany)	5–0	(Turkey) Beşiktaş
Malen 29'; Reus 45+2' (pen.), 53'; Haaland 68', 81'	Report

Westfalenstadion, Dortmund
Attendance: 15,000
Referee: François Letexier (France)

=== Group D ===
Pos	Team	Pld	W	D	L	GF	GA	GD	Pts	Qualification	RMA	INT	SHE	SHK
1	(Spain) Real Madrid	6	5	0	1	14	3	+11	15	Advance to knockout phase	—	2–0	1–2	2–1
2	(Italy) Inter Milan	6	3	1	2	8	5	+3	10	Advance to knockout phase	0–1	—	3–1	2–0
3	(Moldova) Sheriff Tiraspol	6	2	1	3	7	11	−4	7	Transfer to Europa League	0–3	1–3	—	2–0
4	(Ukraine) Shakhtar Donetsk	6	0	2	4	2	12	−10	2		0–5	0–0	1–1	—

Source: UEFA
Rules for classification: Group stage tiebreakers
15 September 2021
18:45 (19:45 UTC+3)

Sheriff Tiraspol (Moldova)	2–0	(Ukraine) Shakhtar Donetsk
Traoré 16'; Yansané 62'	Report

Sheriff Stadium, Tiraspol
Attendance: 5,205
Referee: Deniz Aytekin (Germany)
15 September 2021
21:00

Inter Milan (Italy)	0–1	(Spain) Real Madrid
	Report	Rodrygo 89'

San Siro, Milan
Attendance: 37,082
Referee: Daniel Siebert (Germany)

28 September 2021
18:45 (19:45 UTC+3)

Shakhtar Donetsk (Ukraine)	0–0	(Italy) Inter Milan
	Report

NSC Olimpiyskiy, Kyiv (Note: Shakhtar Donetsk played their home matches at NSC Olimpiyskiy, Kyiv, instead of their regular stadium, the Donbas Arena in Donetsk, due to the war in Donbas.)
Attendance: 26,170
Referee: István Kovács (Romania)
28 September 2021
21:00

Real Madrid (Spain)	1–2	(Moldova) Sheriff Tiraspol
Benzema 65' (pen.)	Report	Yakhshiboev 25'; Thill 90'

Santiago Bernabéu, Madrid
Attendance: 24,522
Referee: Lawrence Visser (Belgium)

19 October 2021
21:00 (22:00 UTC+3)

Shakhtar Donetsk (Ukraine)	0–5	(Spain) Real Madrid
	Report	Kryvtsov 37' (o.g.); Vinícius 51', 56'; Rodrygo 65'; Benzema 90+1'

NSC Olimpiyskiy, Kyiv
Attendance: 34,037
Referee: Srđan Jovanović (Serbia)
19 October 2021
21:00

Inter Milan (Italy)	3–1	(Moldova) Sheriff Tiraspol
Džeko 34'; Vidal 58'; De Vrij 67'	Report	Thill 52'

San Siro, Milan
Attendance: 43,305
Referee: Danny Makkelie (Netherlands)

3 November 2021
18:45

Real Madrid (Spain)	2–1	(Ukraine) Shakhtar Donetsk
Benzema 14', 61'	Report	Fernando 39'

Santiago Bernabéu, Madrid
Attendance: 38,105
Referee: Benoît Bastien (France)
3 November 2021
21:00 (22:00 UTC+2)

Sheriff Tiraspol (Moldova)	1–3	(Italy) Inter Milan
Traoré 90+2'	Report	Brozović 54'; Škriniar 66'; Sánchez 82'

Sheriff Stadium, Tiraspol
Attendance: 5,930
Referee: Felix Zwayer (Germany)

24 November 2021
18:45

Inter Milan (Italy)	2–0	(Ukraine) Shakhtar Donetsk
Džeko 61', 67'	Report

San Siro, Milan
Attendance: 46,225
Referee: Ovidiu Hațegan (Romania)
24 November 2021
21:00 (22:00 UTC+2)

Sheriff Tiraspol (Moldova)	0–3	(Spain) Real Madrid
	Report	Alaba 30'; Kroos 45+1'; Benzema 55'

Sheriff Stadium, Tiraspol
Attendance: 5,932
Referee: Szymon Marciniak (Poland)

7 December 2021
21:00 (22:00 UTC+2)

Shakhtar Donetsk (Ukraine)	1–1	(Moldova) Sheriff Tiraspol
Fernando 42'	Report	Nikolov 90+3'

NSC Olimpiyskiy, Kyiv
Attendance: 6,841
Referee: Donatas Rumšas (Lithuania)
7 December 2021
21:00

Real Madrid (Spain)	2–0	(Italy) Inter Milan
Kroos 17'; Asensio 79'	Report

Santiago Bernabéu, Madrid
Attendance: 46,887
Referee: Felix Brych (Germany)

=== Group E ===
Pos	Team	Pld	W	D	L	GF	GA	GD	Pts	Qualification	BAY	BEN	BAR	DKV
1	(Germany) Bayern Munich	6	6	0	0	22	3	+19	18	Advance to knockout phase	—	5–2	3–0	5–0
2	(Portugal) Benfica	6	2	2	2	7	9	−2	8	Advance to knockout phase	0–4	—	3–0	2–0
3	(Spain) Barcelona	6	2	1	3	2	9	−7	7	Transfer to Europa League	0–3	0–0	—	1–0
4	(Ukraine) Dynamo Kyiv	6	0	1	5	1	11	−10	1		1–2	0–0	0–1	—

Source: UEFA
Rules for classification: Group stage tiebreakers
14 September 2021
21:00

Barcelona (Spain)	0–3	(Germany) Bayern Munich
	Report	Müller 34'; Lewandowski 56', 85'

Camp Nou, Barcelona
Attendance: 39,737
Referee: Michael Oliver (England)
14 September 2021
21:00 (22:00 UTC+3)

Dynamo Kyiv (Ukraine)	0–0	(Portugal) Benfica
	Report

NSC Olimpiyskiy, Kyiv
Attendance: 21,657
Referee: Anthony Taylor (England)

29 September 2021
21:00 (20:00 UTC+1)

Benfica (Portugal)	3–0	(Spain) Barcelona
Núñez 3', 79' (pen.); Silva 69'	Report

Estádio da Luz, Lisbon
Attendance: 29,454
Referee: Daniele Orsato (Italy)
29 September 2021
21:00

Bayern Munich (Germany)	5–0	(Ukraine) Dynamo Kyiv
Lewandowski 12' (pen.), 27'; Gnabry 68'; Sané 74'; Choupo-Moting 87'	Report

Allianz Arena, Munich
Attendance: 25,000
Referee: Marco Guida (Italy)

20 October 2021
18:45

Barcelona (Spain)	1–0	(Ukraine) Dynamo Kyiv
Piqué 36'	Report

Camp Nou, Barcelona
Attendance: 45,968
Referee: Clément Turpin (France)
20 October 2021
21:00 (20:00 UTC+1)

Benfica (Portugal)	0–4	(Germany) Bayern Munich
	Report	Sané 70', 84'; Everton 80' (o.g.); Lewandowski 82'

Estádio da Luz, Lisbon
Attendance: 55,201
Referee: Ovidiu Hațegan (Romania)

2 November 2021
21:00

Bayern Munich (Germany)	5–2	(Portugal) Benfica
Lewandowski 26', 61', 84'; Gnabry 32'; Sané 49'	Report	Morato 38'; Núñez 74'

Allianz Arena, Munich
Attendance: 50,000
Referee: Szymon Marciniak (Poland)
2 November 2021
21:00 (22:00 UTC+2)

Dynamo Kyiv (Ukraine)	0–1	(Spain) Barcelona
	Report	Fati 70'

NSC Olimpiyskiy, Kyiv
Attendance: 31,378
Referee: Ovidiu Hațegan (Romania)

23 November 2021
18:45 (19:45 UTC+2)

Dynamo Kyiv (Ukraine)	1–2	(Germany) Bayern Munich
Harmash 70'	Report	Lewandowski 14'; Coman 42'

NSC Olimpiyskiy, Kyiv
Attendance: 28,732
Referee: Halil Umut Meler (Turkey)
23 November 2021
21:00

Barcelona (Spain)	0–0	(Portugal) Benfica
	Report

Camp Nou, Barcelona
Attendance: 49,572
Referee: Sergei Karasev (Russia)

8 December 2021
21:00

Bayern Munich (Germany)	3–0	(Spain) Barcelona
Müller 34'; Sané 43'; Musiala 62'	Report

Allianz Arena, Munich
Attendance: 0
Referee: Ovidiu Hațegan (Romania)
8 December 2021
21:00 (20:00 UTC+0)

Benfica (Portugal)	2–0	(Ukraine) Dynamo Kyiv
Yaremchuk 16'; Gilberto 22'	Report

Estádio da Luz, Lisbon
Attendance: 36,591
Referee: Deniz Aytekin (Germany)

=== Group F ===
Pos	Team	Pld	W	D	L	GF	GA	GD	Pts	Qualification	MUN	VIL	ATA	YB
1	(England) Manchester United	6	3	2	1	11	8	+3	11	Advance to knockout phase	—	2–1	3–2	1–1
2	(Spain) Villarreal	6	3	1	2	12	9	+3	10	Advance to knockout phase	0–2	—	2–2	2–0
3	(Italy) Atalanta	6	1	3	2	12	13	−1	6	Transfer to Europa League	2–2	2–3	—	1–0
4	(Switzerland) Young Boys	6	1	2	3	7	12	−5	5		2–1	1–4	3–3	—

Source: UEFA
Rules for classification: Group stage tiebreakers
14 September 2021
18:45

Young Boys (Switzerland)	2–1	(England) Manchester United
Ngamaleu 66'; Pefok 90+5'	Report	Ronaldo 13'

Stadion Wankdorf, Bern
Attendance: 31,120
Referee: François Letexier (France)
14 September 2021
21:00

Villarreal (Spain)	2–2	(Italy) Atalanta
Trigueros 39'; Danjuma 73'	Report	Freuler 6'; Gosens 83'

Estadio de la Cerámica, Villarreal
Attendance: 12,916
Referee: Clément Turpin (France)

29 September 2021
18:45

Atalanta (Italy)	1–0	(Switzerland) Young Boys
Pessina 68'	Report

Stadio Atleti Azzurri d'Italia, Bergamo
Attendance: 8,536
Referee: Felix Brych (Germany)
29 September 2021
21:00 (20:00 UTC+1)

Manchester United (England)	2–1	(Spain) Villarreal
Telles 60'; Ronaldo 90+5'	Report	Alcácer 53'

Old Trafford, Manchester
Attendance: 73,130
Referee: Felix Zwayer (Germany)

20 October 2021
21:00 (20:00 UTC+1)

Manchester United (England)	3–2	(Italy) Atalanta
Rashford 53'; Maguire 75'; Ronaldo 81'	Report	Pašalić 15'; Demiral 29'

Old Trafford, Manchester
Attendance: 72,279
Referee: Szymon Marciniak (Poland)
20 October 2021
21:00

Young Boys (Switzerland)	1–4	(Spain) Villarreal
Elia 77'	Report	Pino 6'; Gerard 16'; Moreno 88'; Chukwueze 90+2'

Stadion Wankdorf, Bern
Attendance: 27,398
Referee: Sergei Karasev (Russia)

2 November 2021
21:00

Atalanta (Italy)	2–2	(England) Manchester United
Iličić 12'; Zapata 56'	Report	Ronaldo 45+1', 90+1'

Stadio Atleti Azzurri d'Italia, Bergamo
Attendance: 14,443
Referee: Slavko Vinčić (Slovenia)
2 November 2021
21:00

Villarreal (Spain)	2–0	(Switzerland) Young Boys
Capoue 36'; Danjuma 89'	Report

Estadio de la Cerámica, Villarreal
Attendance: 14,890
Referee: Serdar Gözübüyük (Netherlands)

23 November 2021
18:45

Villarreal (Spain)	0–2	(England) Manchester United
	Report	Ronaldo 78'; Sancho 90'

Estadio de la Cerámica, Villarreal
Attendance: 20,875
Referee: Felix Brych (Germany)
23 November 2021
21:00

Young Boys (Switzerland)	3–3	(Italy) Atalanta
Pefok 39'; Sierro 80'; Hefti 84'	Report	Zapata 10'; Palomino 51'; Muriel 88'

Stadion Wankdorf, Bern
Attendance: 31,120
Referee: Daniel Siebert (Germany)

8 December 2021
21:00 (20:00 UTC+0)

Manchester United (England)	1–1	(Switzerland) Young Boys
Greenwood 9'	Report	Rieder 42'

Old Trafford, Manchester
Attendance: 73,156
Referee: Benoît Bastien (France)
9 December 2021 (Note: The Atalanta v Villarreal match, originally scheduled on 8 December 2021, 21:00, was postponed to the following day, 19:00, due to adverse weather conditions.)
19:00

Atalanta (Italy)	2–3	(Spain) Villarreal
Malinovskyi 71'; Zapata 80'	Report	Danjuma 3', 51'; Capoue 42'

Stadio Atleti Azzurri d'Italia, Bergamo
Attendance: 11,690
Referee: Anthony Taylor (England)

=== Group G ===
Pos	Team	Pld	W	D	L	GF	GA	GD	Pts	Qualification	LIL	SAL	SEV	WOL
1	(France) Lille	6	3	2	1	7	4	+3	11	Advance to knockout phase	—	1–0	0–0	0–0
2	(Austria) Red Bull Salzburg	6	3	1	2	8	6	+2	10	Advance to knockout phase	2–1	—	1–0	3–1
3	(Spain) Sevilla	6	1	3	2	5	5	0	6	Transfer to Europa League	1–2	1–1	—	2–0
4	(Germany) VfL Wolfsburg	6	1	2	3	5	10	−5	5		1–3	2–1	1–1	—

Source: UEFA
Rules for classification: Group stage tiebreakers
14 September 2021
18:45

Sevilla (Spain)	1–1	(Austria) Red Bull Salzburg
Rakitić 42' (pen.)	Report	Sučić 21' (pen.)

Ramón Sánchez Pizjuán, Seville
Attendance: 18,373
Referee: Aleksei Kulbakov (Belarus)
14 September 2021
21:00

Lille (France)	0–0	(Germany) VfL Wolfsburg
	Report

Stade Pierre-Mauroy, Villeneuve-d'Ascq
Attendance: 34,314
Referee: Danny Makkelie (Netherlands)

29 September 2021
21:00

Red Bull Salzburg (Austria)	2–1	(France) Lille
Adeyemi 35' (pen.), 53' (pen.)	Report	Yılmaz 62'

Stadion Wals-Siezenheim, Salzburg
Attendance: 24,207
Referee: Halil Umut Meler (Turkey)
29 September 2021
21:00

VfL Wolfsburg (Germany)	1–1	(Spain) Sevilla
Steffen 48'	Report	Rakitić 87' (pen.)

Volkswagen Arena, Wolfsburg
Attendance: 11,733
Referee: Georgi Kabakov (Bulgaria)

20 October 2021
18:45

Red Bull Salzburg (Austria)	3–1	(Germany) VfL Wolfsburg
Adeyemi 3'; Okafor 65', 77'	Report	L. Nmecha 15'

Stadion Wals-Siezenheim, Salzburg
Attendance: 29,520
Referee: Daniele Orsato (Italy)
20 October 2021
21:00

Lille (France)	0–0	(Spain) Sevilla
	Report

Stade Pierre-Mauroy, Villeneuve-d'Ascq
Attendance: 34,362
Referee: Michael Oliver (England)

2 November 2021
18:45

VfL Wolfsburg (Germany)	2–1	(Austria) Red Bull Salzburg
Baku 3'; L. Nmecha 60'	Report	Wöber 30'

Volkswagen Arena, Wolfsburg
Attendance: 16,112
Referee: Artur Soares Dias (Portugal)
2 November 2021
21:00

Sevilla (Spain)	1–2	(France) Lille
Ocampos 15'	Report	David 43' (pen.); Ikoné 51'

Ramón Sánchez Pizjuán, Seville
Attendance: 29,369
Referee: István Kovács (Romania)

23 November 2021
21:00

Sevilla (Spain)	2–0	(Germany) VfL Wolfsburg
Jordán 12'; Mir 90+7'	Report

Ramón Sánchez Pizjuán, Seville
Attendance: 28,663
Referee: Cüneyt Çakır (Turkey)
23 November 2021
21:00

Lille (France)	1–0	(Austria) Red Bull Salzburg
David 31'	Report

Stade Pierre-Mauroy, Villeneuve-d'Ascq
Attendance: 33,573
Referee: Anthony Taylor (England)

8 December 2021
21:00

VfL Wolfsburg (Germany)	1–3	(France) Lille
Steffen 89'	Report	Yılmaz 11'; David 72'; Gomes 78'

Volkswagen Arena, Wolfsburg
Attendance: 6,544
Referee: Daniele Orsato (Italy)
8 December 2021
21:00

Red Bull Salzburg (Austria)	1–0	(Spain) Sevilla
Okafor 50'	Report

Stadion Wals-Siezenheim, Salzburg
Attendance: 0
Referee: Slavko Vinčić (Slovenia)

=== Group H ===
Pos	Team	Pld	W	D	L	GF	GA	GD	Pts	Qualification	JUV	CHE	ZEN	MAL
1	(Italy) Juventus	6	5	0	1	10	6	+4	15	Advance to knockout phase	—	1–0	4–2	1–0
2	(England) Chelsea	6	4	1	1	13	4	+9	13	Advance to knockout phase	4–0	—	1–0	4–0
3	(Russia) Zenit Saint Petersburg	6	1	2	3	10	10	0	5	Transfer to Europa League	0–1	3–3	—	4–0
4	(Sweden) Malmö FF	6	0	1	5	1	14	−13	1		0–3	0–1	1–1	—

Source: UEFA
Rules for classification: Group stage tiebreakers
14 September 2021
21:00 (20:00 UTC+1)

Chelsea (England)	1–0	(Russia) Zenit Saint Petersburg
Lukaku 69'	Report

Stamford Bridge, London
Attendance: 39,252
Referee: Bartosz Frankowski (Poland)
14 September 2021
21:00

Malmö FF (Sweden)	0–3	(Italy) Juventus
	Report	Alex Sandro 23'; Dybala 45' (pen.); Morata 45+1'

Stadion, Malmö
Attendance: 5,832
Referee: Artur Soares Dias (Portugal)

29 September 2021
18:45 (19:45 UTC+3)

Zenit Saint Petersburg (Russia)	4–0	(Sweden) Malmö FF
Claudinho 9'; Kuzyayev 49'; Sutormin 80'; Wendel 90+4'	Report

Krestovsky Stadium, Saint Petersburg
Attendance: 15,339
Referee: Anastasios Sidiropoulos (Greece)
29 September 2021
21:00

Juventus (Italy)	1–0	(England) Chelsea
Chiesa 46'	Report

Juventus Stadium, Turin
Attendance: 19,934
Referee: Jesús Gil Manzano (Spain)

20 October 2021
21:00 (22:00 UTC+3)

Zenit Saint Petersburg (Russia)	0–1	(Italy) Juventus
	Report	Kulusevski 86'

Krestovsky Stadium, Saint Petersburg
Attendance: 18,717
Referee: Sandro Schärer (Switzerland)
20 October 2021
21:00 (20:00 UTC+1)

Chelsea (England)	4–0	(Sweden) Malmö FF
Christensen 9'; Jorginho 21' (pen.), 57' (pen.); Havertz 48'	Report

Stamford Bridge, London
Attendance: 39,095
Referee: François Letexier (France)

2 November 2021
18:45

Malmö FF (Sweden)	0–1	(England) Chelsea
	Report	Ziyech 56'

Stadion, Malmö
Attendance: 19,551
Referee: Felix Brych (Germany)
2 November 2021
21:00

Juventus (Italy)	4–2	(Russia) Zenit Saint Petersburg
Dybala 11', 58' (pen.); Chiesa 73'; Morata 82'	Report	Bonucci 26' (o.g.); Azmoun 90+2'

Juventus Stadium, Turin
Attendance: 20,053
Referee: Alejandro Hernández Hernández (Spain)

23 November 2021
21:00 (20:00 UTC+0)

Chelsea (England)	4–0	(Italy) Juventus
Chalobah 25'; James 55'; Hudson-Odoi 58'; Werner 90+5'	Report

Stamford Bridge, London
Attendance: 39,513
Referee: Srđan Jovanović (Serbia)
23 November 2021
21:00

Malmö FF (Sweden)	1–1	(Russia) Zenit Saint Petersburg
Rieks 28'	Report	Rakitskyi 90+2' (pen.)

Stadion, Malmö
Attendance: 15,520
Referee: Andris Treimanis (Latvia)

8 December 2021
18:45 (20:45 UTC+3)

Zenit Saint Petersburg (Russia)	3–3	(England) Chelsea
Claudinho 38'; Azmoun 41'; Ozdoyev 90+4'	Report	Werner 2', 85'; Lukaku 62'

Krestovsky Stadium, Saint Petersburg
Attendance: 29,349
Referee: Serdar Gözübüyük (Netherlands)
8 December 2021
18:45

Juventus (Italy)	1–0	(Sweden) Malmö FF
Kean 18'	Report

Juventus Stadium, Turin
Attendance: 17,501
Referee: Irfan Peljto (Bosnia and Herzegovina)
