= 2021–22 UEFA Youth League group stage =

Football tournament group stage

The 2021–22 UEFA Youth League UEFA Champions League Path (group stage) began on 14 September and concluded on 8 December 2021. A total of 32 teams competed in the group stage of the UEFA Champions League Path to decide 16 of the 24 places in the knockout phase (play-offs and the round of 16 onwards) of the 2021–22 UEFA Youth League.

== Draw ==
The youth teams of the 32 clubs which qualified for the 2021–22 UEFA Champions League group stage entered the UEFA Champions League Path. If there was a vacancy (youth teams not entering), it was filled by a team defined by UEFA.

For the UEFA Champions League Path, the 32 teams were drawn into eight groups of four. There was no separate draw held, with the group compositions identical to the draw for the 2021–22 UEFA Champions League group stage, which was held on 26 August 2021, 18:00 CEST (19:00 TRT), in Istanbul, Turkey.

Key to colours
Group winners advanced to round of 16
Group runners-up advanced to play-offs

Pot 1 Team (England) Chelsea (Spain) Villarreal (Spain) Atlético Madrid (England) Manchester City (Germany) Bayern Munich (Italy) Inter Milan (France) Lille (Portugal) Sporting CP	Pot 2 Team (Spain) Real Madrid (Spain) Barcelona (Italy) Juventus (England) Manchester United (France) Paris Saint-Germain (England) Liverpool (Spain) Sevilla (Germany) Borussia Dortmund	Pot 3 Team (Portugal) Porto (Netherlands) Ajax (Ukraine) Shakhtar Donetsk (Germany) RB Leipzig (Austria) Red Bull Salzburg (Portugal) Benfica (Italy) Atalanta (Russia) Zenit Saint Petersburg	Pot 4 Team (Turkey) Beşiktaş (Ukraine) Dynamo Kyiv (Belgium) Club Brugge (Switzerland) Young Boys (Italy) Milan (Sweden) Malmö FF (Germany) VfL Wolfsburg (Moldova) Sheriff Tiraspol

== Format ==
In each group, teams played against each other home-and-away in a round-robin format. The group winners advanced to the round of 16, while the eight runners-up advanced to the play-offs, where they were joined by the eight second round winners from the Domestic Champions Path.

=== Tiebreakers ===
Teams were ranked according to points (3 points for a win, 1 point for a draw, 0 points for a loss). If two or more teams were tied on points, the following tiebreaking criteria were applied, in the order given, to determine the rankings (see Article 17 Equality of points – group stage, Regulations of the UEFA Youth Champions League):

1. Points in head-to-head matches among the tied teams;
2. Goal difference in head-to-head matches among the tied teams;
3. Goals scored in head-to-head matches among the tied teams;
4. If more than two teams were tied, and after applying all head-to-head criteria above, a subset of teams were still tied, all head-to-head criteria above were reapplied exclusively to this subset of teams;
5. Goal difference in all group matches;
6. Goals scored in all group matches;
7. Away goals scored in all group matches;
8. Wins in all group matches;
9. Away wins in all group matches;
10. Disciplinary points (direct red card = 3 points; double yellow card = 3 points; single yellow card = 1 point);
11. Drawing of lots.

Due to the abolition of the away goals rule, head-to-head away goals were no longer applied as a tiebreaker starting from this season. However, total away goals were still applied as a tiebreaker.

== Groups ==
Times are CET/CEST, (Note: CEST (UTC+2) for dates up to 30 October 2021 (matchdays 1–3), and CET (UTC+1) for dates thereafter (matchdays 4–6).) as listed by UEFA (local times, if different, are in parentheses).

=== Group A ===
Pos	Team	Pld	W	D	L	GF	GA	GD	Pts	Qualification	PAR	BRU	MCI	RBL
1	(France) Paris Saint-Germain	6	4	2	0	16	7	+9	14	Round of 16	—	3–2	1–1	3–0
2	(Belgium) Club Brugge	6	3	2	1	18	11	+7	11	Play-offs	2–2	—	1–1	4–1
3	(England) Manchester City	6	2	2	2	12	11	+1	8		1–3	3–5	—	5–1
4	(Germany) RB Leipzig	6	0	0	6	4	21	−17	0		1–4	1–4	0–1	—

Source: UEFA
Rules for classification: Tiebreakers
15 September 2021
16:00 (15:00 UTC+1)

Manchester City (England)	5–1	(Germany) RB Leipzig
McAtee 13', 82'; Bobb 27' (pen.); Sodje 60'; Edozie 73'	Report	Raebiger 4'

Academy Stadium, Manchester
Attendance: 394
Referee: Mads-Kristoffer Kristoffersen (Denmark)
15 September 2021
15:00

Club Brugge (Belgium)	2–2	(France) Paris Saint-Germain
Hautekiet 45+1', 88'	Report	Gassama 30'; Hautekiet 79' (o.g.)

Schiervelde Stadion, Roeselare
Attendance: 750
Referee: Aleksandrs Anufrijevs (Latvia)

28 September 2021
14:00

RB Leipzig (Germany)	1–4	(Belgium) Club Brugge
Friedrich 32'	Report	Audoor 36'; Sandra 61', 78'; Talbi 90+4'

Stadion am Cottaweg, Leipzig
Attendance: 451
Referee: Volen Chinkov (Bulgaria)
28 September 2021
16:00

Paris Saint-Germain (France)	1–1	(England) Manchester City
Simons 68' (pen.)	Report	Charles 30'

Stade Municipal Georges Lefèvre, Saint-Germain-en-Laye
Attendance: 961
Referee: Ádám Farkas (Hungary)

19 October 2021
13:30

Club Brugge (Belgium)	1–1	(England) Manchester City
Sabbe 45+1'	Report	Wilson-Esbrand 78'

Schiervelde Stadion, Roeselare
Attendance: 749
Referee: António Nobre (Portugal)
19 October 2021
15:00

Paris Saint-Germain (France)	3–0	(Germany) RB Leipzig
Odobert 11'; Simons 66'; Bitshiabu 83'	Report

Stade Municipal Georges Lefèvre, Saint-Germain-en-Laye
Attendance: 805
Referee: Duje Strukan (Croatia)

3 November 2021
15:00

RB Leipzig (Germany)	1–4	(France) Paris Saint-Germain
Wosz 32'	Report	Michut 25'; Gassama 56', 80'; Gharbi 62' (pen.)

Stadion am Cottaweg, Leipzig
Attendance: 502
Referee: Ioannis Papadopoulos (Greece)
3 November 2021
17:00 (16:00 UTC+0)

Manchester City (England)	3–5	(Belgium) Club Brugge
McAtee 12', 49', 65'	Report	Sandra 61', 70'; Engels 74' (pen.); Audoor 84'; Servais 90+6'

Academy Stadium, Manchester
Attendance: 402
Referee: Krzysztof Jakubik (Poland)

24 November 2021
16:00 (15:00 UTC+0)

Manchester City (England)	1–3	(France) Paris Saint-Germain
Lewis 84'	Report	Gassama 40', 49'; Odobert 80'

Academy Stadium, Manchester
Attendance: 554
Referee: Jens Maae (Denmark)
24 November 2021
15:00

Club Brugge (Belgium)	4–1	(Germany) RB Leipzig
Hautekiet 31'; Engels 43'; Sandra 60'; Audoor 80'	Report	Friedrich 40'

Schiervelde Stadion, Roeselare
Attendance: 1,189
Referee: Pavel Orel (Czech Republic)

7 December 2021
13:00

RB Leipzig (Germany)	0–1	(England) Manchester City
	Report	Borges 83'

Stadion am Cottaweg, Leipzig
Attendance: 0
Referee: Balázs Berke (Hungary)
7 December 2021
14:00

Paris Saint-Germain (France)	3–2	(Belgium) Club Brugge
Simons 69'; Zaïre-Emery 73'; Odobert 90+4'	Report	Servais 19'; Engels 44' (pen.)

Stade Municipal Georges Lefèvre, Saint-Germain-en-Laye
Attendance: 740
Referee: Kristoffer Karlsson (Sweden)

=== Group B ===
Pos	Team	Pld	W	D	L	GF	GA	GD	Pts	Qualification	LIV	ATM	POR	MIL
1	(England) Liverpool	6	3	2	1	9	4	+5	11	Round of 16	—	2–0	4–0	1–0
2	(Spain) Atlético Madrid	6	3	1	2	9	6	+3	10 (Note: Head-to-head: Atlético Madrid 3 pts (0 GD, 3 GF), Porto 3 pts (0 GD, 3 GF). Goal difference in all group matches: Atlético Madrid +3, Porto –1.)	Play-offs	2–0	—	1–2	3–0
3	(Portugal) Porto	6	3	1	2	8	9	−1	10		1–1	1–2	—	3–1
4	(Italy) Milan	6	0	2	4	3	10	−7	2		1–1	1–1	0–1	—

Source: UEFA
Rules for classification: Tiebreakers
Notes:
15 September 2021
14:00 (13:00 UTC+1)

Liverpool (England)	1–0	(Italy) Milan
Woltman 8'	Report

The Academy, Kirkby
Attendance: 50
Referee: Rohit Saggi (Norway)
15 September 2021
12:00

Atlético Madrid (Spain)	1–2	(Portugal) Porto
Salim 56'	Report	Abreu 34'; Pinheiro 62'

Centro Deportivo Wanda Alcalá de Henares, Alcalá de Henares
Attendance: 255
Referee: Antti Munukka (Finland)

28 September 2021
14:30

Milan (Italy)	1–1	(Spain) Atlético Madrid
Gala 45'	Report	Salim 22'

Centro Sportivo Vismara, Milan
Attendance: 250
Referee: Miroslav Zelinka (Czech Republic)
28 September 2021
15:30 (14:30 UTC+1)

Porto (Portugal)	1–1	(England) Liverpool
Abreu 70'	Report	Frauendorf 80'

Estádio Municipal Jorge Sampaio, Vila Nova de Gaia
Attendance: 658
Referee: Jonathan Lardot (Belgium)

19 October 2021
16:00

Atlético Madrid (Spain)	2–0	(England) Liverpool
Gismera 26'; Salim 70'	Report

Centro Deportivo Wanda Alcalá de Henares, Alcalá de Henares
Attendance: 864
Referee: Ivaylo Stoyanov (Bulgaria)
19 October 2021
15:30 (14:30 UTC+1)

Porto (Portugal)	3–1	(Italy) Milan
Sousa 44'; Candé 46'; Dabo 90+3'	Report	Roback 66'

Estádio Municipal Jorge Sampaio, Vila Nova de Gaia
Attendance: 510
Referee: Iwan Griffith (Wales)

3 November 2021
15:30

Milan (Italy)	0–1	(Portugal) Porto
	Report	Abreu 72' (pen.)

Centro Sportivo Vismara, Milan
Attendance: 330
Referee: Trustin Farrugia Cann (Malta)
3 November 2021
17:00 (16:00 UTC+0)

Liverpool (England)	2–0	(Spain) Atlético Madrid
Woltman 64'; Quansah 70'	Report

The Academy, Kirkby
Attendance: 176
Referee: Mykola Balakin (Ukraine)

24 November 2021
15:00 (14:00 UTC+0)

Liverpool (England)	4–0	(Portugal) Porto
Corness 5'; Bajcetic 45+3'; Woltman 69'; Norris 90'	Report

The Academy, Kirkby
Attendance: 138
Referee: Mohammed Al-Hakim (Sweden)
24 November 2021
12:00

Atlético Madrid (Spain)	3–0	(Italy) Milan
Currás 21' (pen.); Serrano 81' (pen.); Gismera 90+1'	Report

Centro Deportivo Wanda Alcalá de Henares, Alcalá de Henares
Attendance: 753
Referee: Alexandre Boucaut (Belgium)

7 December 2021
15:30 (14:30 UTC+0)

Porto (Portugal)	1–2	(Spain) Atlético Madrid
Abreu 55' (pen.)	Report	Kostis 18'; Martín 65'

Estádio Municipal Jorge Sampaio, Vila Nova de Gaia
Attendance: 408
Referee: Rob Harvey (Republic of Ireland)
7 December 2021
14:30

Milan (Italy)	1–1	(England) Liverpool
Nasti 78'	Report	Musiałowski 4'

Centro Sportivo Vismara, Milan
Attendance: 180
Referee: Vladimir Moskalev (Russia)

=== Group C ===
Pos	Team	Pld	W	D	L	GF	GA	GD	Pts	Qualification	SPO	DOR	AJX	BES
1	(Portugal) Sporting CP	6	3	2	1	11	8	+3	11	Round of 16	—	3–2	1–1	1–2
2	(Germany) Borussia Dortmund	6	3	1	2	16	9	+7	10 (Note: Head-to-head points: Borussia Dortmund 3, Ajax 3. Head-to-head goal difference: Borussia Dortmund +3, Ajax –3.)	Play-offs	0–0	—	0–1	6–2
3	(Netherlands) Ajax	6	3	1	2	9	10	−1	10		2–3	1–5	—	3–1
4	(Turkey) Beşiktaş	6	1	0	5	8	17	−9	3		1–3	2–3	0–1	—

Source: UEFA
Rules for classification: Tiebreakers
Notes:
15 September 2021
13:00

Beşiktaş (Turkey)	2–3	(Germany) Borussia Dortmund
Demir 24' (pen.); Ilkhan 60'	Report	Bamba 16'; Fink 33' (pen.); Rijkhoff 85'

Sarıyer Yusuf Ziya Öniş Stadyumu, Istanbul
Attendance: 100
Referee: Giorgi Kruashvili (Georgia)
15 September 2021
12:00

Sporting CP (Portugal)	1–1	(Netherlands) Ajax
M. Fernandes 10'	Report	Jensen 49'

Stadium Aurelio Pereira, Alcochete
Attendance: 455
Referee: Jonathan Lardot (Belgium)

28 September 2021
14:30

Ajax (Netherlands)	3–1	(Turkey) Beşiktaş
Hlynsson 35'; Van Axel Dongen 55'; Misehouy 78'	Report	Yağcı 81'

De Toekomst, Ouder-Amstel
Attendance: 0
Referee: Peter Kjaesgaard (Denmark)
28 September 2021
15:30

Borussia Dortmund (Germany)	0–0	(Portugal) Sporting CP
	Report

Dortmund Brackel Training Ground, Dortmund
Attendance: 600
Referee: Manfredas Lukjančukas (Lithuania)

19 October 2021
13:30 (14:30 UTC+3)

Beşiktaş (Turkey)	1–3	(Portugal) Sporting CP
Delibaş 49'	Report	Travassos 40'; Vardar 60' (o.g.); Justo 86'

Sarıyer Yusuf Ziya Öniş Stadyumu, Istanbul
Attendance: 140
Referee: Peter Kjaesgaard (Denmark)
19 October 2021
14:00

Ajax (Netherlands)	1–5	(Germany) Borussia Dortmund
Banel 24'	Report	Fink 18', 40'; Thaqi 33'; Lütke-Frie 67', 69'

De Toekomst, Ouder-Amstel
Attendance: 1,016
Referee: Kristoffer Karlsson (Sweden)

3 November 2021
15:30

Borussia Dortmund (Germany)	0–1	(Netherlands) Ajax
	Report	Rasmussen 16'

Dortmund Brackel Training Ground, Dortmund
Attendance: 560
Referee: Michael Fabbri (Italy)
3 November 2021
16:00 (15:00 UTC+0)

Sporting CP (Portugal)	1–2	(Turkey) Beşiktaş
Cisse 56' (o.g.)	Report	Yağcı 19'; Demir 20'

Stadium Aurelio Pereira, Alcochete
Attendance: 219
Referee: Bojan Pandžić (Sweden)

24 November 2021
13:30 (14:30 UTC+3)

Beşiktaş (Turkey)	0–1	(Netherlands) Ajax
	Report	Van Axel Dongen 13' (pen.)

Sarıyer Yusuf Ziya Öniş Stadyumu, Istanbul
Attendance: 120
Referee: Volen Chinkov (Bulgaria)
24 November 2021
16:00 (15:00 UTC+0)

Sporting CP (Portugal)	3–2	(Germany) Borussia Dortmund
Chermiti 26'; Menino 56'; Ribeiro 81'	Report	Bynoe-Gittens 22'; Fink 90+3'

Stadium Aurelio Pereira, Alcochete
Attendance: 498
Referee: José Luis Munuera (Spain)

7 December 2021
14:30

Ajax (Netherlands)	2–3	(Portugal) Sporting CP
Van Axel Dongen 23' (pen.), 25'	Report	M. Fernandes 42'; Chermiti 71'; Lamba 87'

De Toekomst, Ouder-Amstel
Attendance: 0
Referee: Espen Eskås (Norway)
7 December 2021
14:00

Borussia Dortmund (Germany)	6–2	(Turkey) Beşiktaş
Rijkhoff 3', 46'; Bynoe-Gittens 5', 63'; Kamara 39', 79'	Report	Yağcı 31'; Ilkhan 55'

Dortmund Brackel Training Ground, Dortmund
Attendance: 395
Referee: Denys Shurman (Ukraine)

=== Group D ===
Pos	Team	Pld	W	D	L	GF	GA	GD	Pts	Qualification	RMA	INT	SHK	SHE
1	(Spain) Real Madrid	6	4	1	1	11	6	+5	13 (Note: Head-to-head points: Real Madrid 4, Inter Milan 1.)	Round of 16	—	2–1	1–0	4–1
2	(Italy) Inter Milan	6	4	1	1	10	6	+4	13	Play-offs	1–1	—	1–0	2–1
3	(Ukraine) Shakhtar Donetsk	6	3	0	3	14	5	+9	9		3–2	0–1	—	6–0
4	(Moldova) Sheriff Tiraspol	6	0	0	6	4	22	−18	0		0–1	2–4	0–5	—

Source: UEFA
Rules for classification: Tiebreakers
Notes:
15 September 2021
11:00

Sheriff Tiraspol (Moldova)	0–5	(Ukraine) Shakhtar Donetsk
	Report	Veklenko 37'; Siheyev 56'; Honcharuk 64'; Hlushchenko 68' (pen.); Pohorilyi 90+3' (pen.)

Sheriff Small Arena, Tiraspol
Attendance: 200
Referee: Barbeno Luca (San Marino)
15 September 2021
16:00

Inter Milan (Italy)	1–1	(Spain) Real Madrid
Nunziatini 90+3'	Report	Peter 70'

Stadio Ernesto Breda, Sesto San Giovanni
Attendance: 256
Referee: Horatiu Fesnic (Romania)

28 September 2021
12:00 (13:00 UTC+3)

Shakhtar Donetsk (Ukraine)	0–1	(Italy) Inter Milan
	Report	Casadei 31'

Bannikov Stadium, Kyiv
Attendance: 521
Referee: Juri Frischer (Estonia)
28 September 2021
16:00

Real Madrid (Spain)	4–1	(Moldova) Sheriff Tiraspol
Villar 37'; Iglesias 51', 72' (pen.); Guerrero 80'	Report	Ferrer 47' (o.g.)

Alfredo Di Stéfano Stadium, Madrid
Attendance: 0
Referee: Kári á Høvdanum (Faroe Islands)

19 October 2021
12:00 (13:00 UTC+3)

Shakhtar Donetsk (Ukraine)	3–2	(Spain) Real Madrid
Hlushchenko 32'; Siheyev 42'; Hulko 45'	Report	Peter 10'; Marvel 41'

Bannikov Stadium, Kyiv
Attendance: 456
Referee: Julian Weinberger (Austria)
19 October 2021
14:00

Inter Milan (Italy)	2–1	(Moldova) Sheriff Tiraspol
Casadei 50'; Carmanov 67' (o.g.)	Report	Pogreban 83'

Stadio Ernesto Breda, Sesto San Giovanni
Attendance: 200
Referee: Lukas Fähndrich (Switzerland)

3 November 2021
14:00

Real Madrid (Spain)	1–0	(Ukraine) Shakhtar Donetsk
Aranda 58'	Report

Alfredo Di Stéfano Stadium, Madrid
Attendance: 331
Referee: Don Robertson (Scotland)
3 November 2021
11:00 (12:00 UTC+2)

Sheriff Tiraspol (Moldova)	2–4	(Italy) Inter Milan
Forov 8', 75'	Report	Abiuso 36'; Fabbian 40'; Peschetola 62', 81'

Sheriff Small Arena, Tiraspol
Attendance: 513
Referee: Miloš Milanović (Serbia)

24 November 2021
14:00

Inter Milan (Italy)	1–0	(Ukraine) Shakhtar Donetsk
Peschetola 4'	Report

Stadio Ernesto Breda, Sesto San Giovanni
Attendance: 202
Referee: Peter Kralović (Slovakia)
24 November 2021
11:00 (12:00 UTC+2)

Sheriff Tiraspol (Moldova)	0–1	(Spain) Real Madrid
	Report	Iglesias 75'

Sheriff Small Arena, Tiraspol
Attendance: 478
Referee: Gal Leibovitz (Israel)

7 December 2021
12:00 (13:00 UTC+2)

Shakhtar Donetsk (Ukraine)	6–0	(Moldova) Sheriff Tiraspol
Bako 6'; Pohorilyi 39' (pen.); Hlushchenko 43'; Yushchenko 80'; Honcharuk 85' (pen.); Hulko 87'	Report

Bannikov Stadium, Kyiv
Attendance: 106
Referee: Haris Kaljanac (Bosnia and Herzegovina)
7 December 2021
16:00

Real Madrid (Spain)	2–1	(Italy) Inter Milan
González 7' (pen.); Aranda 72'	Report	Abiuso 54'

Alfredo Di Stéfano Stadium, Madrid
Attendance: 600
Referee: Erik Lambrechts (Belgium)

=== Group E ===
Pos	Team	Pld	W	D	L	GF	GA	GD	Pts	Qualification	BEN	DKV	BAR	BAY
1	(Portugal) Benfica	6	5	0	1	14	4	+10	15	Round of 16	—	1–0	4–0	4–0
2	(Ukraine) Dynamo Kyiv	6	4	1	1	14	3	+11	13	Play-offs	4–0	—	4–1	2–1
3	(Spain) Barcelona	6	1	1	4	4	14	−10	4		0–3	0–0	—	2–0
4	(Germany) Bayern Munich	6	1	0	5	4	15	−11	3		0–2	0–4	3–2	—

Source: UEFA
Rules for classification: Tiebreakers
14 September 2021
16:00

Barcelona (Spain)	2–0	(Germany) Bayern Munich
Luzzi 24'; Casas 64'	Report

Johan Cruyff Stadium, Sant Joan Despí
Attendance: 872
Referee: David Coote (England)
14 September 2021
15:00

Dynamo Kyiv (Ukraine)	4–0	(Portugal) Benfica
Bol 8'; Brazhko 65' (pen.); Voloshyn 79'; Diallo 80'	Report

Valeriy Lobanovskyi Dynamo Stadium, Kyiv
Attendance: 3,112
Referee: Dumitri Muntean (Moldova)

29 September 2021
15:00 (14:00 UTC+1)

Benfica (Portugal)	4–0	(Spain) Barcelona
Resende 45+1', 56'; Ndour 49'; Neto 68'	Report

Futebol Campus, Seixal
Attendance: 596
Referee: Anastasios Papapetrou (Greece)
29 September 2021
16:00

Bayern Munich (Germany)	0–4	(Ukraine) Dynamo Kyiv
	Report	Diallo 33', 57'; Voloshyn 59'; Skrypnyk 85'

FC Bayern Campus, Munich
Attendance: 550
Referee: Trustin Farrugia Cann (Malta)

20 October 2021
14:00

Barcelona (Spain)	0–0	(Ukraine) Dynamo Kyiv
	Report

Johan Cruyff Stadium, Sant Joan Despí
Attendance: 609
Referee: Alexandre Boucaut (Belgium)
20 October 2021
16:00 (15:00 UTC+1)

Benfica (Portugal)	4–0	(Germany) Bayern Munich
Santos 4'; Ndour 32'; Moreira 34'; Neves 72'	Report

Futebol Campus, Seixal
Attendance: 915
Referee: Kai Erik Steen (Norway)

2 November 2021
16:00

Bayern Munich (Germany)	0–2	(Portugal) Benfica
	Report	Rodrigues 6'; Semedo 12'

FC Bayern Campus, Munich
Attendance: 650
Referee: Abdulkadir Bitigen (Turkey)
2 November 2021
15:00 (16:00 UTC+2)

Dynamo Kyiv (Ukraine)	4–1	(Spain) Barcelona
Diallo 2', 83'; Popov 45+1'; Dyachuk 66'	Report	Fuentes 37'

Valeriy Lobanovskyi Dynamo Stadium, Kyiv
Attendance: 974
Referee: Duje Strukan (Croatia)

23 November 2021
15:00 (16:00 UTC+2)

Dynamo Kyiv (Ukraine)	2–1	(Germany) Bayern Munich
Yatsyk 7'; Brazhko 69' (pen.)	Report	Dibrani 90+1'

Valeriy Lobanovskyi Dynamo Stadium, Kyiv
Attendance: 804
Referee: Ion Orlic (Moldova)
23 November 2021
16:00

Barcelona (Spain)	0–3	(Portugal) Benfica
	Report	Neto 30'; T. Araújo 45+5' (pen.); Santos 64'

Johan Cruyff Stadium, Sant Joan Despí
Attendance: 894
Referee: Jérémie Pignard (France)

8 December 2021
16:00

Bayern Munich (Germany)	3–2	(Spain) Barcelona
Janitzek 21'; Motika 41', 50'	Report	Garrido 1'; Barberà 9'

FC Bayern Campus, Munich
Attendance: 0
Referee: Dario Bel (Croatia)
8 December 2021
13:00 (12:00 UTC+0)

Benfica (Portugal)	1–0	(Ukraine) Dynamo Kyiv
Semedo 44'	Report

Futebol Campus, Seixal
Attendance: 650
Referee: Ádám Farkas (Hungary)

=== Group F ===
Pos	Team	Pld	W	D	L	GF	GA	GD	Pts	Qualification	MUN	VIL	ATA	YB
1	(England) Manchester United	6	5	0	1	12	9	+3	15	Round of 16	—	1–4	4–2	2–1
2	(Spain) Villarreal	6	3	2	1	15	9	+6	11	Play-offs	1–2	—	2–0	3–3
3	(Italy) Atalanta	6	2	1	3	11	12	−1	7		1–2	2–2	—	3–0
4	(Switzerland) Young Boys	6	0	1	5	7	15	−8	1		0–1	1–3	2–3	—

Source: UEFA
Rules for classification: Tiebreakers
14 September 2021
14:00

Young Boys (Switzerland)	0–1	(England) Manchester United
	Report	Shoretire 14'

Sportpark Wyler, Bern
Attendance: 500
Referee: Aristotelis Diamantopoulos (Greece)
14 September 2021
16:00

Villarreal (Spain)	2–0	(Italy) Atalanta
Pacheco 7'; García 90+1'	Report

Mini Estadi de la Ciudad Deportiva del Villarreal, Castellón de la Plana
Attendance: 1,300
Referee: Ivaylo Stoyanov (Bulgaria)

29 September 2021
13:00

Atalanta (Italy)	3–0	(Switzerland) Young Boys
Oliveri 20'; Omar 41'; Lozza 55'	Report

Centro Sportivo Bortolotti, Bergamo
Attendance: 100
Referee: Enea Jorgji (Albania)
29 September 2021
14:00 (13:00 UTC+1)

Manchester United (England)	1–4	(Spain) Villarreal
Fernández 72'	Report	Torrents 5'; Pascual 22'; Henry 28'; Rodri 45+2'

Leigh Sports Village, Leigh
Attendance: 614
Referee: Thorvaldur Árnason (Iceland)

20 October 2021
16:00

Young Boys (Switzerland)	1–3	(Spain) Villarreal
Amenda 45+2'	Report	Pascual 19'; Foubert 67'; Hinojosa 90+3'

Sportpark Wyler, Bern
Attendance: 500
Referee: Joonas Jaanovits (Estonia)
20 October 2021
14:00 (13:00 UTC+1)

Manchester United (England)	4–2	(Italy) Atalanta
Iqbal 22'; Hugill 24'; Garnacho 30'; Forson 63'	Report	Panada 20'; De Nipoti 90+3'

Leigh Sports Village, Leigh
Attendance: 441
Referee: Filip Glova (Slovakia)

2 November 2021
17:00

Villarreal (Spain)	3–3	(Switzerland) Young Boys
Jiménez 13' (pen.); Pacheco 59'; Torrents 62'	Report	Appiah 23'; De Donno 61'; Amenda 84' (pen.)

Mini Estadi de la Ciudad Deportiva del Villarreal, Castellón de la Plana
Attendance: 615
Referee: Andrei Chivulete (Romania)
2 November 2021
14:00

Atalanta (Italy)	1–2	(England) Manchester United
Renault 37' (pen.)	Report	Shoretire 8'; Elanga 23'

Centro Sportivo Bortolotti, Bergamo
Attendance: 150
Referee: Mads-Kristoffer Kristoffersen (Denmark)

23 November 2021
14:00

Villarreal (Spain)	1–2	(England) Manchester United
Jiménez 34'	Report	McNeill 62'; Mather 85'

Mini Estadi de la Ciudad Deportiva del Villarreal, Castellón de la Plana
Attendance: 620
Referee: Vitor Ferreira (Portugal)
23 November 2021
14:00

Young Boys (Switzerland)	2–3	(Italy) Atalanta
Berisha 25'; Appiah 51'	Report	Sidibe 37', 55' (pen.); Lozza 83'

Sportpark Wyler, Bern
Attendance: 315
Referee: Jason Barcelo (Gibraltar)

8 December 2021
13:00

Atalanta (Italy)	2–2	(Spain) Villarreal
Renault 15' (pen.); Fisic 46'	Report	Torrents 75'; Pacheco 84'

Centro Sportivo Bortolotti, Bergamo
Attendance: 80
Referee: Mohammed Al-Emara (Finland)
8 December 2021
16:00 (15:00 UTC+0)

Manchester United (England)	2–1	(Switzerland) Young Boys
Garnacho 41'; McNeill 80'	Report	De Donno 58' (pen.)

Leigh Sports Village, Leigh
Attendance: 272
Referee: Mohammed Al-Emara (Finland)

=== Group G ===
Pos	Team	Pld	W	D	L	GF	GA	GD	Pts	Qualification	SAL	SEV	LIL	WOL
1	(Austria) Red Bull Salzburg	6	4	0	2	10	5	+5	12	Round of 16	—	2–0	3–1	3–0
2	(Spain) Sevilla	6	3	2	1	8	3	+5	11	Play-offs	2–0	—	0–0	2–0
3	(France) Lille	6	3	1	2	7	6	+1	10		1–0	0–3	—	2–0
4	(Germany) VfL Wolfsburg	6	0	1	5	2	13	−11	1		1–2	1–1	0–3	—

Source: UEFA
Rules for classification: Tiebreakers
14 September 2021
11:30

Sevilla (Spain)	2–0	(Austria) Red Bull Salzburg
A. Fernández 35'; Zarzana 45+1'	Report

Estadio Jesús Navas, Seville
Attendance: 184
Referee: Peter Kralović (Slovakia)
14 September 2021
14:00

Lille (France)	2–0	(Germany) VfL Wolfsburg
Bica Reis 24', 90'	Report

Domaine de Luchin, Lille
Attendance: 400
Referee: Igor Pajac (Croatia)

29 September 2021
14:00

Red Bull Salzburg (Austria)	3–1	(France) Lille
Šimić 32' (pen.), 49'; Kameri 65'	Report	Said 89'

Stadion Grödig, Grödig
Attendance: 338
Referee: Mohammed Al-Hakim (Sweden)
29 September 2021
16:00

VfL Wolfsburg (Germany)	1–1	(Spain) Sevilla
Ambros 27'	Report	D. Fernández 65'

AOK Stadion, Wolfsburg
Attendance: 476
Referee: Urs Schnyder (Switzerland)

20 October 2021
14:00

Lille (France)	0–3	(Spain) Sevilla
	Report	Benavides 22'; D. Fernández 65'; Sánchez 90+2'

Domaine de Luchin, Lille
Attendance: 316
Referee: Jørgen Burchardt (Denmark)
20 October 2021
14:00

Red Bull Salzburg (Austria)	3–0	(Germany) VfL Wolfsburg
Omoregie 37'; Owusu 81'; Meier 88' (o.g.)	Report

Stadion Grödig, Grödig
Attendance: 438
Referee: Ondrej Pechanec (Czech Republic)

2 November 2021
16:00

Sevilla (Spain)	0–0	(France) Lille
	Report

Estadio Jesús Navas, Seville
Attendance: 260
Referee: Vitor Ferreira (Portugal)
2 November 2021
14:00

VfL Wolfsburg (Germany)	1–2	(Austria) Red Bull Salzburg
Busch 54'	Report	Wallner 8'; Baidoo 90+4'

AOK Stadion, Wolfsburg
Attendance: 523
Referee: Espen Eskås (Norway)

23 November 2021
14:00

Sevilla (Spain)	2–0	(Germany) VfL Wolfsburg
Rodríguez 15'; Benavides 88'	Report

Estadio Jesús Navas, Seville
Attendance: 226
Referee: Alain Durieux (Luxembourg)
23 November 2021
14:30

Lille (France)	1–0	(Austria) Red Bull Salzburg
Mpembele Boula 78' (pen.)	Report

Domaine de Luchin, Lille
Attendance: 500
Referee: Antti Munukka (Finland)

8 December 2021
16:00

VfL Wolfsburg (Germany)	0–3	(France) Lille
	Report	Mpembele Boula 1'; Bica Reis 62'; Auvray 90+3'

AOK Stadion, Wolfsburg
Attendance: 210
Referee: Juxhin Xhaja (Albania)
8 December 2021
14:00

Red Bull Salzburg (Austria)	2–0	(Spain) Sevilla
Major 74'; Šimić 90+1'	Report

Stadion Grödig, Grödig
Attendance: 0
Referee: Vilhjálmur Alvar Thórarinsson (Iceland)

=== Group H ===
Pos	Team	Pld	W	D	L	GF	GA	GD	Pts	Qualification	JUV	CHE	ZEN	MAL
1	(Italy) Juventus	6	5	1	0	18	7	+11	16	Round of 16	—	3–1	4–2	4–1
2	(England) Chelsea	6	3	1	2	15	10	+5	10	Play-offs	1–3	—	3–1	4–2
3	(Russia) Zenit Saint Petersburg	6	2	1	3	10	13	−3	7		0–2	1–1	—	3–2
4	(Sweden) Malmö FF	6	0	1	5	8	21	−13	1		2–2	0–5	1–3	—

Source: UEFA
Rules for classification: Tiebreakers
14 September 2021
14:00

Chelsea (England)	3–1	(Russia) Zenit Saint Petersburg
Webster 53'; Vale 69' (pen.); Soonsup-Bell 72'	Report	Kim 34'

Chelsea Football Club Training Ground, Stoke d'Abernon
Attendance: 150
Referee: Rob Hennessy (Republic of Ireland)
14 September 2021
15:00

Malmö FF (Sweden)	2–2	(Italy) Juventus
Widell 10'; Lindman 71'	Report	Chibozo 6'; Turco 22'

Malmö Idrottsplats, Malmö
Attendance: 912
Referee: Iwan Griffith (Wales)

29 September 2021
11:00 (12:00 UTC+3)

Zenit Saint Petersburg (Russia)	3–2	(Sweden) Malmö FF
Mikhailovskii 43'; Rodionov 79'; Zigangirov 90+1'	Report	Björkqvist 11'; Bjerkebo 89'

Smena Stadium, Saint Petersburg
Attendance: 300
Referee: Artyom Kuchin (Kazakhstan)
29 September 2021
16:00

Juventus (Italy)	3–1	(England) Chelsea
Soulé 27'; Mulazzi 45+1'; Galante 89'	Report	Wareham 74'

Juventus Training Ground, Turin
Attendance: 99
Referee: António Nobre (Portugal)

20 October 2021
13:00 (14:00 UTC+3)

Zenit Saint Petersburg (Russia)	0–2	(Italy) Juventus
	Report	Mulazzi 2'; Turco 68'

Smena Stadium, Saint Petersburg
Attendance: 340
Referee: Amine Kourgheli (Belarus)
20 October 2021
13:00 (12:00 UTC+1)

Chelsea (England)	4–2	(Sweden) Malmö FF
Rankine 61'; Simons 69'; Fiabema 77'; Thomas 89'	Report	Bjerkebo 6', 58'

Kingsmeadow, London
Attendance: 321
Referee: Kári Á Høvdanum (Faroe Islands)

2 November 2021
15:00

Juventus (Italy)	4–2	(Russia) Zenit Saint Petersburg
Iling 16'; Mulazzi 31'; Chibozo 44'; Strijdonck 84'	Report	Belokhonov 61'; Khvastukhin 87'

Juventus Training Ground, Turin
Attendance: 140
Referee: Enea Jorgji (Albania)
2 November 2021
13:00

Malmö FF (Sweden)	0–5	(England) Chelsea
	Report	Fiabema 40', 44'; Hall 58'; Gilchrist 76'; Webster 89'

Malmö Idrottsplats, Malmö
Attendance: 1,752
Referee: Julian Weinberger (Austria)

23 November 2021
16:00 (15:00 UTC+0)

Chelsea (England)	1–3	(Italy) Juventus
Haigh 90'	Report	Soulé 1'; Miretti 31' (pen.); Turco 44'

Chelsea Football Club Training Ground, Stoke d'Abernon
Attendance: 0
Referee: Ádám Farkas (Hungary)
23 November 2021
15:00

Malmö FF (Sweden)	1–3	(Russia) Zenit Saint Petersburg
Karlin 78' (pen.)	Report	Sandrachuk 60'; Mikhailovskii 66'; Khvastukhin 87'

Malmö Idrottsplats, Malmö
Attendance: 435
Referee: Joonas Jaanovits (Estonia)

8 December 2021
10:00 (12:00 UTC+3)

Zenit Saint Petersburg (Russia)	1–1	(England) Chelsea
Kim 66'	Report	Gilchrist 50'

Smena Stadium, Saint Petersburg
Attendance: 130
Referee: Dumitri Muntean (Moldova)
8 December 2021
16:00

Juventus (Italy)	4–1	(Sweden) Malmö FF
Cerri 20', 59'; Mbangula 30'; Doratiotto 78'	Report	Bjerkebo 71'

Juventus Training Ground, Turin
Attendance: 100
Referee: Novak Simović (Serbia)
