= 2021–22 UEFA Youth League knockout phase =

Football season

The 2021–22 UEFA Youth League knockout phase began on 8 February 2022 with the play-off round and ended with the final on 25 April 2022 at Colovray Stadium in Nyon, Switzerland, to decide the champions of the 2021–22 UEFA Youth League. All matches were played across 90 minutes and penalty shoot-out if necessary.

Times are CET/CEST.

== Format ==
The mechanism of the draws for each round was as follows:

- In the draw for the knockout round play-offs, the eight second round winners from the Domestic Champions Path were drawn against the eight group runners-up from the UEFA Champions League Path, with the teams from the Domestic Champions Path hosting the match. Teams from the same association could not be drawn against each other.
- In the draw for the round of 16, there were no seedings, and the sixteen teams (eight UEFA Champions League Path group winners and eight play-off winners) were drawn into eight ties. Teams from the same UEFA Champions League Path group could not be drawn against each other, but teams from the same association could be drawn against each other. The draw also decided the home team for each round of 16 match.
- In the draws for the quarter-finals onwards, there were no seedings, and teams from the same UEFA Champions League Path group or the same association could be drawn against each other (the identity of the quarter-final winners and onwards was not known at the time of the draws). The draws also decided the home team for each quarter-final, and which quarter-final and semi-final winners were designated as the "home" team for each semi-final and final (for administrative purposes as they were played at a neutral venue).

== Qualified teams ==
Group	Winners (enter round of 16)	Runners-up (enter play-offs as away team)
A	(France) Paris Saint-Germain	(Belgium) Club Brugge
B	(England) Liverpool	(Spain) Atlético Madrid
C	(Portugal) Sporting CP	(Germany) Borussia Dortmund
D	(Spain) Real Madrid	(Italy) Inter Milan
E	(Portugal) Benfica	(Ukraine) Dynamo Kyiv
F	(England) Manchester United	(Spain) Villarreal
G	(Austria) Red Bull Salzburg	(Spain) Sevilla
H	(Italy) Juventus	(England) Chelsea

=== Domestic Champions Path ===
Second round winners
(enter play-offs as home team)
(Croatia) Hajduk Split
(Belgium) Genk
(Spain) Deportivo La Coruña
(Slovakia) Žilina
(Italy) Empoli
(Denmark) Midtjylland
(Netherlands) AZ
(Scotland) Rangers

== Schedule ==
Knockout phase schedule
Phase	Round	Draw date	Match dates
Knockout phase	Knockout round play-offs	14 December 2021	8–9 February 2022
Knockout phase	Round of 16	14 February 2022	1–2 March, 7 April 2022
Knockout phase	Quarter-finals	14 February 2022	15–16 March, 13 April 2022
Knockout phase	Semi-finals	14 February 2022	22 April 2022 at Colovray Stadium, Nyon
Knockout phase	Final	14 February 2022	25 April 2022 at Colovray Stadium, Nyon

== Bracket ==
Knockout round play-offs
(Italy) Empoli	3
(Germany) Borussia Dortmund	5
(Croatia) Hajduk Split	0 (2)
(Spain) Atlético Madrid (p)	0 (3)
(Scotland) Rangers	0
(Spain) Sevilla	1
(Slovakia) Žilina	3
(Italy) Inter Milan	1
(Netherlands) AZ (p)	3 (4)
(Spain) Villarreal	3 (3)
(Belgium) Genk	5
(England) Chelsea	1
(Spain) Deportivo La Coruña	2 (2)
(Ukraine) Dynamo Kyiv (p)	2 (3)
(Denmark) Midtjylland	3
(Belgium) Club Brugge	2

Round of 16
(England) Manchester United	2 (1)
(Germany) Borussia Dortmund (p)	2 (3)
(Spain) Real Madrid	2
(Spain) Atlético Madrid	3
(France) Paris Saint-Germain	2
(Spain) Sevilla	0
(Slovakia) Žilina	1 (3)
(Austria) Red Bull Salzburg (p)	1 (4)
(Netherlands) AZ	0 (4)
(Italy) Juventus (p)	0 (5)
(England) Liverpool (p)	1 (4)
(Belgium) Genk	1 (3)
(Ukraine) Dynamo Kyiv	1
(Portugal) Sporting CP	2
(Denmark) Midtjylland	2
(Portugal) Benfica	3

Quarter-finals
(Germany) Borussia Dortmund	0
(Spain) Atlético Madrid	1
(France) Paris Saint-Germain	1
(Austria) Red Bull Salzburg	3
(Italy) Juventus	2
(England) Liverpool	0
(Portugal) Sporting CP	0
(Portugal) Benfica	4

Semi-finals
22 April – Nyon
(Spain) Atlético Madrid	0
(Austria) Red Bull Salzburg	5
22 April – Nyon
(Italy) Juventus	2 (3)
(Portugal) Benfica (p)	2 (4)

Final
25 April – Nyon
(Austria) Red Bull Salzburg	0
(Portugal) Benfica	6

== Knockout round play-offs ==
=== Summary ===
The draw was conducted on 14 December 2021 12:00 CET at the UEFA headquarters in Nyon. The knockout round play-offs were played over one leg on 8 and 9 February 2022.

Home team	Score	Away team
Empoli (Italy)	3–5	(Germany) Borussia Dortmund
Genk (Belgium)	5–1	(England) Chelsea
AZ (Netherlands)	3–3 (4–3 p)	(Spain) Villarreal
Žilina (Slovakia)	3–1	(Italy) Inter Milan
Hajduk Split (Croatia)	0–0 (2–3 p)	(Spain) Atlético Madrid
Midtjylland (Denmark)	3–2	(Belgium) Club Brugge
Deportivo La Coruña (Spain)	2–2 (2–3 p)	(Ukraine) Dynamo Kyiv
Rangers (Scotland)	0–1	(Spain) Sevilla

=== Matches ===
8 February 2022
18:00

Empoli (Italy)	3–5	(Germany) Borussia Dortmund
Magazzu 16', 28'; Panicucci 86'	Report	Bynoe-Gittens 15'; Pezzola 41' (o.g.); Rijkhoff 57'; Fink 63'; Semić 77'

Stadio Carlo Castellani, Empoli
Attendance: 1,047
Referee: Igor Pajac (Croatia)

9 February 2022
16:00

Genk (Belgium)	5–1	(England) Chelsea
Diawara 18', 66'; Geusens 57' (pen.); Abid 77'; Cutillas Carpe 90'	Report	Hall 70'

Cegeka Arena – Stadium B, Genk
Attendance: 1,436
Referee: Rohit Saggi (Norway)

8 February 2022
14:30

AZ (Netherlands)	3–3	(Spain) Villarreal
Van Brederode 14' (pen.), 20' (pen.); Meerdink 70'	Report	Jiménez 9'; Pascual 76'; Saavedra 87'
Penalties
Goes (penalty scored); Twisk (penalty missed); De Jong (penalty scored); Meerdink (penalty scored); Schouten (penalty scored)	4–3	(penalty scored) Pascual; (penalty missed) Saavedra; (penalty scored) Torrents; (penalty scored) Hinojosa; (penalty missed) M. Sánchez

AZ Training Centre, Wijdewormer
Attendance: 300
Referee: Robert Ian Jenkins (Wales)

8 February 2022
16:30

Žilina (Slovakia)	3–1	(Italy) Inter Milan
Sauer 1', 47'; Valko 90+6'	Report	Jurgens 77'

Štadión pod Dubňom, Žilina
Attendance: 2,454
Referee: Sebastian Gishamer (Austria)

9 February 2022
18:00

Hajduk Split (Croatia)	0–0	(Spain) Atlético Madrid
	Report
Penalties
Ljubičić (penalty missed); Hrgović (penalty scored); Vrcić (penalty scored); Capan (penalty missed); Pukstas (penalty missed)	2–3	(penalty scored) Currás; (penalty missed) Corral; (penalty scored) Ginard; (penalty scored) Martín

Stadion Poljud, Split
Attendance: 8,761
Referee: Jérémie Pignard (France)

9 February 2022
13:00

Midtjylland (Denmark)	3–2	(Belgium) Club Brugge
Andreasen 32'; Simsir 63'; Fraulo 71'	Report	Nusa 3', 15'

Ikast Stadium, Ikast
Attendance: 499
Referee: Don Robertson (Scotland)

9 February 2022
19:00

Deportivo La Coruña (Spain)	2–2	(Ukraine) Dynamo Kyiv
Nájera 4'; López 26'	Report	Tsarenko 7'; Yatsyk 75'
Penalties
Ochoa (penalty scored); Guerra (penalty missed); Gómez (penalty scored); Barcia (penalty missed); Rodríguez (penalty missed)	2–3	(penalty scored) Popov; (penalty missed) Diallo; (penalty scored) El Khamlichi; (penalty scored) Vivcharenko

Riazor, A Coruña
Attendance: 20,115
Referee: António Nobre (Portugal)

8 February 2022
16:00

Rangers (Scotland)	0–1	(Spain) Sevilla
	Report	Álvarez 50'

Dumbarton Football Stadium, Dumbarton
Attendance: 554
Referee: Allard Lindhout (Netherlands)

== Round of 16 ==
=== Summary ===
The draw was conducted on 14 February 2022 12:00 CET at the UEFA headquarters in Nyon. The round of 16 was played over one leg on 1 March, 2 March and 7 April 2022.

Home team	Score	Away team
Liverpool (England)	1–1 (4–3 p)	(Belgium) Genk
Real Madrid (Spain)	2–3	(Spain) Atlético Madrid
AZ (Netherlands)	0–0 (4–5 p)	(Italy) Juventus
Dynamo Kyiv (Ukraine)	1–2	(Portugal) Sporting CP
Manchester United (England)	2–2 (1–3 p)	(Germany) Borussia Dortmund
Žilina (Slovakia)	1–1 (3–4 p)	(Austria) Red Bull Salzburg
Paris Saint-Germain (France)	2–0	(Spain) Sevilla
Midtjylland (Denmark)	2–3	(Portugal) Benfica

=== Matches ===
2 March 2022
15:00

Liverpool (England)	1–1	(Belgium) Genk
Cannonier 43'	Report	Geusens 50'
Penalties
Norris (penalty scored); O'Rourke (penalty scored); Woltman (penalty scored); Corness (penalty missed); Clark (penalty scored)	4–3	(penalty missed) Rommens; (penalty scored) Beerten; (penalty missed) Geusens; (penalty scored) Godts; (penalty scored) Diawara

Liverpool FC Academy Training Ground, Liverpool
Attendance: 205
Referee: Manfredas Lukjancukas (Lithuania)

2 March 2022
21:00

Real Madrid (Spain)	2–3	(Spain) Atlético Madrid
González 58'; Marvel 89'	Report	Barrios 25', 66'; Diez 50'

Alfredo Di Stéfano Stadium, Madrid
Attendance: 2,102
Referee: Harm Osmers (Germany)

2 March 2022
14:00

AZ (Netherlands)	0–0	(Italy) Juventus
	Report
Penalties
Goes (penalty scored); Dekker (penalty scored); De Jong (penalty scored); Meerdink (penalty scored); Schouten (penalty missed)	4–5	(penalty scored) Iling; (penalty scored) Muharemović; (penalty scored) Savona; (penalty scored) Hasa; (penalty scored) Strijdonck

AZ Training Centre, Wijdewormer
Attendance: 1,250
Referee: Julian Weinberger (Austria)

7 April 2022 (Note: Originally scheduled for 2 March 2022 at the Valeriy Lobanovskyi Dynamo Stadium in Kyiv, the match was postponed and relocated due to the Russian invasion of Ukraine. As a result, Ukrainian teams were required to play their home matches at neutral venues until further notice.)
14:00

Dynamo Kyiv (Ukraine)	1–2	(Portugal) Sporting CP
Brazhko 49' (pen.)	Report	Cabral 2', 28'

Stadionul Rapid-Giulești, Bucharest, Romania
Attendance: 1,517
Referee: Bram Van Driessche (Belgium)

1 March 2022
21:00

Manchester United (England)	2–2	(Germany) Borussia Dortmund
McNeill 23'; Bennett 85'	Report	Bynoe-Gittens 16', 68'
Penalties
Jurado (penalty scored); McNeill (penalty missed); Mejbri (penalty missed); Emeran (penalty missed)	1–3	(penalty scored) Gürpüz; (penalty missed) Coulibaly; (penalty missed) El-Zein; (penalty scored) Rothe; (penalty scored) Bynoe-Gittens

Leigh Sports Village, Leigh
Attendance: 1,316
Referee: Kaspar Sjöberg (Sweden)

2 March 2022
16:30

Žilina (Slovakia)	1–1	(Austria) Red Bull Salzburg
Addo 37'	Report	Šimić 65' (pen.)
Penalties
Talakov (penalty scored); Stojchevski (penalty scored); Kaprálik (penalty missed); Sauer (penalty scored); Jambor (penalty missed)	3–4	(penalty scored) Šimić; (penalty missed) Hofer; (penalty scored) Omoregie; (penalty scored) Atiabou; (penalty scored) Halwachs

Štadión pod Dubňom, Žilina
Attendance: 5,626
Referee: Trustin Farugia Cann (Malta)

1 March 2022
18:00

Paris Saint-Germain (France)	2–0	(Spain) Sevilla
Simons 45+2' (pen.); Yansane 86' (pen.)	Report

Stade Municipal Georges Lefèvre, Saint-Germain-en-Laye
Attendance: 800
Referee: Nicholas Walsh (Scotland)

2 March 2022
14:00

Midtjylland (Denmark)	2–3	(Portugal) Benfica
Şimşir 10'; Christensen 12'	Report	Moreira 5'; Silva 38'; Semedo 80'

Ikast Stadium, Ikast
Attendance: 614
Referee: Enea Jorgji (Albania)

== Quarter-finals ==
=== Summary ===
The draw was conducted on 14 February 2022 12:00 CET at the UEFA headquarters in Nyon. The quarter-finals were played over one leg from 15 March to 13 April 2022.

Home team	Score	Away team
Juventus (Italy)	2–0	(England) Liverpool
Paris Saint-Germain (France)	1–3	(Austria) Red Bull Salzburg
Sporting CP (Portugal)	0–4	(Portugal) Benfica
Borussia Dortmund (Germany)	0–1	(Spain) Atlético Madrid

=== Matches ===
15 March 2022
16:00

Juventus (Italy)	2–0	(England) Liverpool
Miretti 66'; Chibozo 69'	Report

Juventus Training Ground, Turin
Attendance: 280
Referee: Rohit Saggi (Norway)

16 March 2022
14:00

Paris Saint-Germain (France)	1–3	(Austria) Red Bull Salzburg
Michut 1'	Report	Diakité 37'; Šimić 72'; Reischl 90+2'

Stade Municipal Georges Lefèvre, Saint-Germain-en-Laye
Attendance: 610
Referee: Duje Strukan (Croatia)

13 April 2022
15:00

Sporting CP (Portugal)	0–4	(Portugal) Benfica
	Report	Santos 29', 59'; Moreira 57', 90'

Estádio Aurélio Pereira, Alcochete
Attendance: 851
Referee: Rade Obrenovič (Slovenia)

16 March 2022
16:30

Borussia Dortmund (Germany)	0–1	(Spain) Atlético Madrid
	Report	Currás 31' (pen.)

Westfalenstadion, Dortmund
Attendance: 19,300
Referee: Julian Weinberger (Austria)

== Semi-finals ==
=== Summary ===
The draw was conducted on 14 February 2022 12:00 CET at the UEFA headquarters in Nyon. The semi-finals were played over one leg on 22 April 2022 at Colovray Stadium, Nyon.

Team 1	Score	Team 2
Juventus (Italy)	2–2 (3–4 p)	(Portugal) Benfica
Atlético Madrid (Spain)	0–5	(Austria) Red Bull Salzburg

=== Matches ===
22 April 2022
14:00

Juventus (Italy)	2–2	(Portugal) Benfica
Chibozo 51'; Turicchia 73'	Report	Neto 3'; Semedo 10'
Penalties
Iling (penalty scored); Miretti (penalty scored); Turco (penalty missed); Hasa (penalty scored); Soulé (penalty missed)	3–4	(penalty scored) T. Araújo; (penalty scored) Silva; (penalty missed) Félix; (penalty scored) Neto; (penalty scored) Rodrigues

Colovray Stadium, Nyon
Attendance: 3,326
Referee: Allard Lindhout (Netherlands)

22 April 2022
18:00

Atlético Madrid (Spain)	0–5	(Austria) Red Bull Salzburg
	Report	Šimić 15', 28' (pen.); Kameri 44'; Sahin 67'; Diakité 89'

Colovray Stadium, Nyon
Attendance: 2,500
Referee: Horatiu Fesnic (Romania)

== Final ==
The draw was conducted on 14 February 2022 12:00 CET at the UEFA headquarters in Nyon. The final was played on 25 April 2022 at Colovray Stadium, Nyon.

This was a replay of the 2017 UEFA Youth League Final, which Salzburg won 2–1. Benfica won 6–0 to win their first Youth League title, and their first title in European football since the 1961–62 European Cup.

25 April 2022
18:00

Red Bull Salzburg (Austria)	0–6	(Portugal) Benfica
	Report	Neto 2'; H. Araújo 15', 57', 89' (pen.); Ndour 53'; Semedo 69'

Colovray Stadium, Nyon
Attendance: 4,000
Referee: Harm Osmers (Germany)
