= Álex Jiménez =

Álex Jiménez is the name of:

- Álex Jiménez (footballer, born 2002), Dominican Republic footballer
- Álex Jiménez (footballer, born 2003), Spanish footballer
- Álex Jiménez (footballer, born 2005), Spanish footballer
- Alex Ramon Jimenez, American soldier abducted in the May 2007 abduction of United States soldiers in Iraq
