= SG Wattenscheid 09 =

German football club

- Full name: Sportgemeinschaft 09 Wattenscheid e. V.
- Nickname: "09"
- Founded: 1909
- Ground: Lohrheide-Stadion
- Capacity: 16,233
- Manager: Przemyslaw Czapp
- League: Oberliga Westfalen (V)
- 2025–26: Oberliga Westfalen 2nd of 18 (promoted)
Home colours	Away colours	Third colours

SG Wattenscheid 09 is a German association football club located in Wattenscheid, Bochum, North Rhine-Westphalia. The club claimed an official founding date of 18 September 1909 as Ballspiel-Verein Wattenscheid out of the merger of two earlier sides known as BV Sodalität der Wattenscheid and BV Teutonia Wattenscheid.

On 23 October 2019, the club filed for bankruptcy and retired from the 2019–20 Regionalliga West season, so it was relegated to the Oberliga Westfalen.

== History ==
The club played quietly as a local side until briefly coming to notice in the war-ravaged Gauliga Westfalen, then a division of top flight German football, in the abbreviated 1944–45 season.

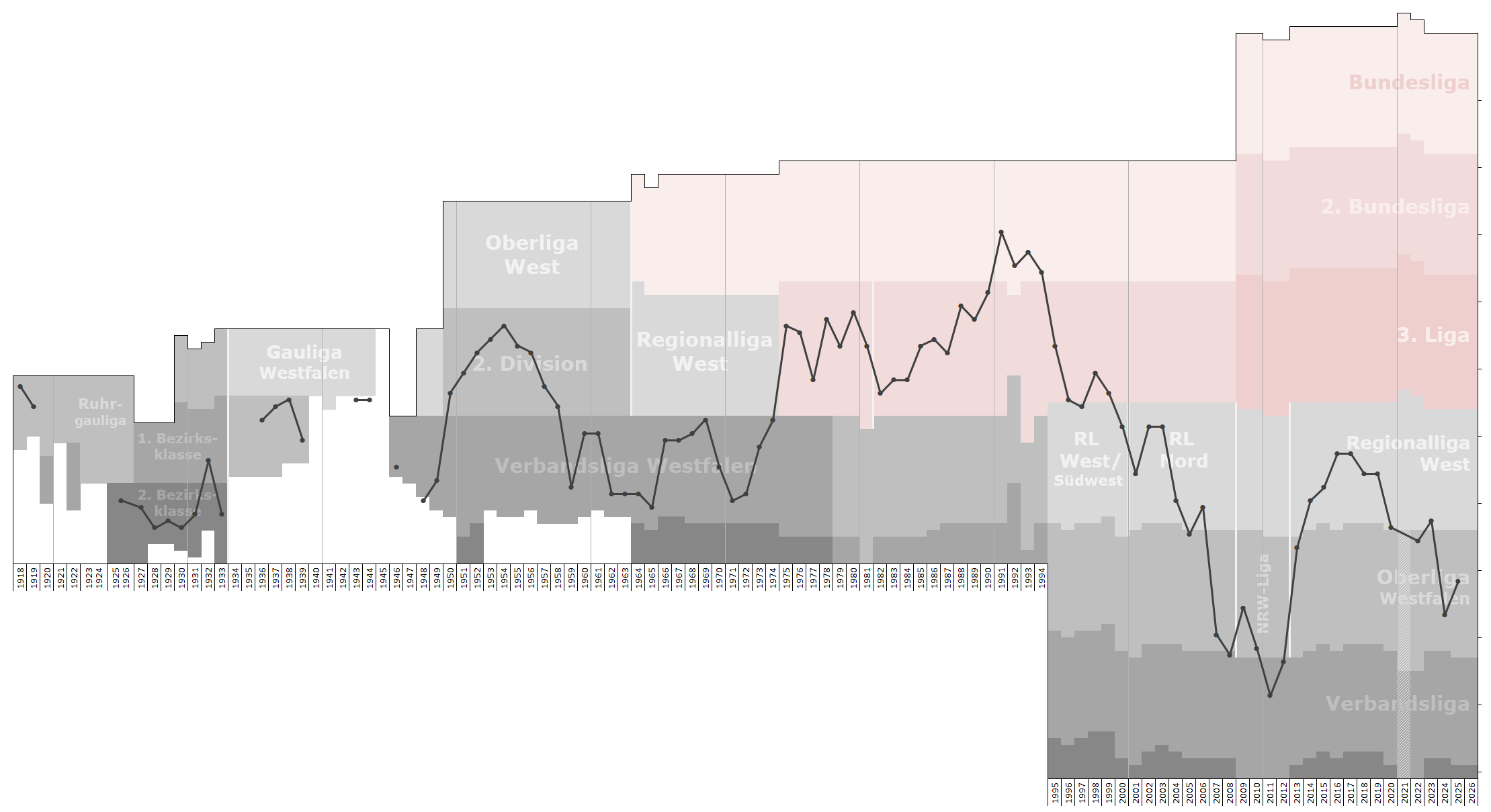
Historical chart of Wattenscheid league performance

In 1958, Wattenscheid joined the Verbandsliga Westfalen (III) and a title there in 1969 saw the club promoted to the Regionalliga West (II). Despite a Regionalliga title in 1974 they did not move up due to the restructuring of the German competition, but instead continued to play second-division football in the newly formed 2. Bundesliga Nord. Through a period from the late 70s on to the late 80s the team struggled somewhat, earning uneven results and having several close brushes with relegation. They played well enough to earn a 10th-place finish in 1981 and stay up when the 2. Bundesliga Nord and 2. Bundesliga Süd were combined into a single division, but the next year they escaped being sent down in the bottom four only because TSV 1860 Munich was denied a license and was instead forced down to tier III play.

From that point the club slowly turned itself around and in 1990 earned promotion to the top-flight by way of a second-place result in their division. However, their Bundesliga stay was a brief four years with their best result being an 11th-place finish in their debut season. The most memorable matches in this period are the victory in the derby against VfL Bochum in 1992 (2–0) and the two victories against German record champion Bayern Munich in 1991 (3–2) and 1993 (2–0). After relegation in 1994, Wattenscheid spent two campaigns in the 2. Bundesliga, before slipping to Regionalliga in 1996 for one season and returned for two campaigns back in the 2. Bundesliga. In 1999, Wattenscheid was slipping to Regionalliga and Oberliga in 2004. The next season, in 2005, they could advance to the Regionalliga again. Two consecutive relegations brought them to the Verbandsliga Westfalen in 2007, where they played for one season before qualifying for the new Oberliga Nordrhein-Westfalen. Wattenscheid played Oberliga for 2 seasons and relegated again to Verbandsliga after finishing 18th in 2009–10 season.

After winning the regional Westfalenpokal in 1996, Wattenscheid qualified for the first round of DFB-Pokal in 1996–97 where they faced Borussia Dortmund, at that time the reigning German champions. They won the match 4–3 (after extra time) but were eliminated by Karlsruher SC II in the following round, losing 4–2 in a penalty shootout.

After being relegated from the NRW-Liga in 2009–10, they dropped to the six-tier Verbandsliga Westfalen II, but climbed to the fourth-tier Regionalliga West three years later, in 2013. The club filed for bankruptcy during the 2019/20 season resulting in relegation to the Oberliga Westfalen for the 2020/21 season where they currently play.

Older logo

SG Wattenscheid are notably friendly with Scottish Championship club Queen’s Park who they have had a partnership with for 20 years as of 2025. Fans of the clubs can be seen at either clubs’ stadiums.

== Squad ==
As of September 8, 2026

Note: Flags indicate national team as defined under FIFA eligibility rules; some limited exceptions apply. Players may hold more than one non-FIFA nationality.

No.	Pos.	Nation	Player
1	GK	GER	Joshua Mroß
2	DF	GER	Nicolai Schulte-Kellinghaus (on loan from Rot-Weiss Essen)
4	DF	GER	Albin Thaqi
5	DF	GER	Imran Ali
6	MF	GER	Tom Sindermann
7	FW	UKR	Ilya Polyakov
8	MF	GER	Maximilian Adamski
9	FW	GER	Kevin Schacht
10	FW	ENG	Robert Nnaji
11	FW	POL	Philip Buczkowski
13	MF	GER	Nicolas Hirschberger
14	MF	GER	Medin Kojić
15	DF	KOS	Agon Arifi
17	DF	GER	Eduard Renke

No.	Pos.	Nation	Player
18	MF	GER	Nico Buckmaier
19	MF	GER	Marlon Sadowski
20	DF	GER	Henri Bollmann
21	MF	GER	Kaan Kurt
22	MF	GER	Elias Demirarslan
23	MF	SEN	Tidiane Gueye
25	DF	GER	Vincent Gembalies
26	MF	GER	Steve Tunga
27	FW	GER	Finn Wortmann
30	FW	GER	Isaak Nwachukwu
31	GK	GER	Elias Yousfi
33	FW	AUT	Thomas Gösweiner
41	GK	GER	Jens Balzukat

== Notable managers ==
- Hubert Schieth (1969–1971)
- Helmut Witte (1975–1976)
- Erhard Ahmann (1976–1977)
- Hubert Schieth (1977–1981)
- Fahrudin Jusufi (1982–1985)
- Hans-Werner Moors (1985–1987)
- Gerd Roggensack (1987–1989)
- Hannes Bongartz (1990–1994)
- Frank Hartmann (1994)
- Heinz-Josef Koitka (1994)
- Franz-Josef Kneuper (1994)
- Hans-Peter Briegel (1994–1995)
- Frank Wagener (1995–1996)
- Peter Vollmann (1996)
- Franz-Josef Tenhagen (1996–1998)
- Hannes Bongartz (1998–2004)
- Marcel Witeczek (2004)
- Georg Kreß (2004–2006)
- Dirk Helmig (2006–2009)
- Thomas Obliers (2009)

== Honours ==
- 2. Bundesliga (II)
  - Runners-up: 1989–90 (promoted to Bundesliga)
- Regionalliga West (II)
  - Champions: 1973–74
- Regionalliga West/Südwest (III)
  - Champions: 1996–97
- Amateurliga Westfalen (III)
  - Champions: 1968–69
- Oberliga Westfalen (IV)
  - Champions: 2004–05
- Verbandsliga Westfalen (V)
  - Champions: 2007–08
- Westphalia Cup
  - Winners: 1995–96, 2015–16
- German Under 17 championship
  - Champions: 1981–82
