= Aitor Gismera =

Spanish footballer (born 2004)

Personal information
- Full name: Aitor Gismera Monge
- Date of birth: 21 February 2004 (age 22)
- Place of birth: Getafe, Spain
- Height: 1.82 m (6 ft 0 in)
- Position: Midfielder

Team information
- Current team: Betis B
- Number: 20

Youth career
- 2012–2022: Atlético Madrid

Senior career*
Years	Team	Apps	(Gls)
2022–2025	Atlético Madrid B	83	(0)
2025–	Betis B	23	(0)

International career^{‡}
2018–2019	Spain U15	8	(2)
2020	Spain U16	3	(1)
2022–2023	Spain U19	3	(0)
- * Club domestic league appearances and goals as of 10 June 2026 ‡ National team caps and goals as of 11 December 2024

Aitor Gismera Monge (born 21 February 2004) is a Spanish footballer who plays as a midfielder for Primera Federación club Betis B.

== Club career ==
=== Atlético Madrid ===
At the age of eight, Gismera joined the youth academy of La Liga side Atletico Madrid, where he played in the UEFA Youth League. In addition, he is known for In 2022, he was promoted to the club's reserve team, helping them achieve promotion from the fourth tier to the third tier.

=== Betis ===
In August 2025, Gismera joined Real Betis' reserve team, signed a contract with the Seville-based club until 2027.

== International career ==
Gismera is a Spain youth international, having represented the country at under-15, under-16, and under-19 levels.

== Style of play ==
Gismera plays as a midfielder and is right-footed. Spanish newspaper Mundo Deportivo wrote that he is known for his "character, poise and leadership in the centre of the field, which is combined with great ball handling".
