= Antonio Gala (footballer) =

Italian footballer (born 2004)

Personal information
- Date of birth: 7 June 2004 (age 22)
- Place of birth: Naples, Italy
- Height: 1.75 m (5 ft 9 in)
- Position: Midfielder

Team information
- Current team: Castellón
- Number: 27

Youth career
- RD Internapoli
- 2018–2023: AC Milan

Senior career*
Years	Team	Apps	(Gls)
2023–2025	AC Milan	0	(0)
2023–2024	→ Sestri Levante (loan)	32	(0)
2024–2025	Milan Futuro (res.)	3	(0)
2025	Foggia	10	(2)
2025–2026	Campobasso	35	(5)
2026–	Castellón	6	(0)

International career
2021	Italy U18	2	(0)
- * Club domestic league appearances and goals as of 17 October 2026

Antonio Gala (born 7 June 2004) is an Italian professional footballer who plays as a midfielder for Segunda División club Castellón.

== Club career ==
Born in Naples, Gala joined AC Milan's youth sector in 2018, from hometown side RD Internapoli. In December 2021, he signed his first professional contract with the club, and was an unused substitute with the first team in a UEFA Champions League match against English Premier League club Chelsea on 5 October 2022.

On 19 July 2023, after finishing his formation, Gala was loaned to Serie C side Sestri Levante for the season. Regularly used, he returned to the Rossoneri in July 2024, being included in the squad of newly-established reserve team Milan Futuro in the Serie C.

On 29 January 2025, Gala left Milan and signed a permanent deal with Foggia also in the third division.

On 3 July, he was announced at fellow league team Campobasso on a two-year contract.

On 24 July 2026, Gala moved abroad for the first time in his career, agreeing to a four-year deal with Spanish Segunda División side Castellón.

== International career ==
Gala played for the Italy national under-18 team in two friendlies in 2021.
