= Jay-Dee Geusens =

Belgian footballer (born 2002)

Personal information
- Date of birth: 5 March 2002 (age 24)
- Place of birth: Zutendaal, Belgium
- Height: 1.85 m (6 ft 1 in)
- Position: Midfielder

Team information
- Current team: Al Jazira
- Number: 25

Youth career
- –2021: Genk

Senior career*
Years	Team	Apps	(Gls)
2021–2023	Genk	2	(0)
2022–2023	Jong Genk	24	(5)
2023–2024	Beveren	24	(1)
2024–	Al Jazira	24	(2)

International career^{‡}
2017	Belgium U15	2	(1)
2019	Belgium U18	1	(2)
- * Club domestic league appearances and goals as of 29 July 2026 ‡ National team caps and goals as of 15 November 2019

Jay-Dee Geusens (born 5 March 2002) is a Belgian football player who plays for Al Jazira.

== Club career ==
Geusens started his career at a very young age at Genk. He was well known for his outstanding kicking technique. He made his Belgian First Division A debut for Genk on 26 September 2021 in a game against Seraing.

On 18 July 2023, Geusens signed a three-year contract with Beveren where he became a key player in the first squad.

On 26 September 2024, Geusens signed a three-year contract with Al Jazira Club in the United Arab Emirates.
