= José Bica =

Portuguese footballer (born 2003)

Personal information
- Full name: José Manuel Bica Reis
- Date of birth: 16 June 2003 (age 23)
- Place of birth: Mirandela, Portugal
- Height: 1.80 m (5 ft 11 in)
- Position: Forward

Team information
- Current team: Leixões
- Number: 9

Youth career
- Mirandela
- 2014–2019: Porto
- 2018–2019: → Padroense (loan)
- 2019–2020: Chaves
- 2020–2021: Lille

Senior career*
Years	Team	Apps	(Gls)
2021–2023	Lille	0	(0)
2021–2022	Lille B	11	(7)
2023	Marítimo B	13	(4)
2023–2024	Marítimo	15	(1)
2024	Vitória Guimarães B	3	(0)
2024–	Vitória Guimarães	4	(0)
2025	→ Leixões (loan)	12	(4)
2025–	Leixões	24	(9)

International career
2020	Portugal U17	3	(0)
2021	Portugal U18	2	(1)
2021	Portugal U19	3	(0)
- * Club domestic league appearances and goals as of 19 June 2026

José Manuel Bica Reis (born 16 June 2003) is a Portuguese footballer who plays as a forward for Leixões.

== Club career ==
=== Early career and Lille ===
Born in Mirandela in the Bragança District, Bica began playing at local SC Mirandela. In 2014, he helped the team to the district title by scoring 205 of their 258 goals; this drew the attention of the Big Three, of whom he chose to sign for FC Porto.

After playing for Porto and their farm team Padroense FC, Bica joined G.D. Chaves in 2019 and scored 19 goals in 20 games. In August 2020, he signed his first professional contract, for five years at Lille OSC in France's Ligue 1. He played for the reserve team in the fifth-tier Championnat National 3, but was called up for first-team matches.

=== Marítimo ===
On 31 January 2023, Bica returned to his country, signing for C.S. Marítimo. He was assigned to their B-team in the fourth-level Campeonato de Portugal.

Bica played 15 first-team games in the Liga Portugal 2 in 2023–24, scoring on 28 January in a 3–2 loss at AVS Futebol SAD. The following month he was suspended from the team allegedly due to a conflict with teammate Francis Cann, and his representatives pushed for a free transfer to Vitória de Guimarães as they believed that his contractual clause for automatic two-year renewal was invalid.

=== Vitória Guimarães and Leixões ===
Bica completed his move to Vitória on 7 July 2024, signing a four-year deal. On 27 October, having already debuted for the club in the UEFA Conference League and represented their reserves in the fourth division, he played his first Primeira Liga game in a 2–2 draw at C.F. Estrela da Amadora; he came on as a late substitute.

On 3 February 2025, having made 10 appearances for Vitória across all competitions, Bica was loaned to Leixões S.C. of the second tier, without the option to buy. By late April, national sporting newspaper Record was reporting that his good form was leading Vitória to consider him as a starting player for the following season. He finished his loan with 12 games, 4 goals and 2 assists.

Bica returned to Leixões on 1 September 2025, on a three-year deal and a transfer fee of €300,000.

== International career ==
Bica earned his first international caps in February 2020, with three appearances for Portugal under-17 at the Algarve tournament. In June 2021, he played two under-18 friendlies against Norway, scoring to conclude a 2–1 win in the latter game at the Estádio Pina Manique in Lisbon. Later in the year, he played three European qualifiers for the under-19s, ending on 12 October when he was sent off in a 1–0 loss away to Slovakia for a confrontation with goalkeeper Filip Baláž minutes after coming on as a substitute.
