= Pedro Santos (footballer, born 2003) =

Portuguese footballer

Personal information
- Full name: Pedro Miguel Costa Santos
- Date of birth: 10 February 2003 (age 23)
- Place of birth: Sanguedo, Portugal
- Height: 1.78 m (5 ft 10 in)
- Positions: Winger; attacking midfielder

Team information
- Current team: Famalicão
- Number: 10

Youth career
- 2012–2016: Fiães
- 2016–2021: Benfica

Senior career*
| Years | Team | Apps | (Gls) |
| 2021–2025 | Benfica B | 62 | (8) |
| 2024–2025 | → Moreirense (loan) | 21 | (0) |
| 2025– | Famalicão | 29 | (3) |

International career
| 2021 | Portugal U18 | 2 | (0) |
| 2021–2022 | Portugal U19 | 5 | (0) |
| 2022–2023 | Portugal U20 | 6 | (1) |
| 2023–2025 | Portugal U21 | 13 | (3) |
- * Club domestic league appearances and goals as of 19:56, 25 October 2026 (UTC)

Pedro Miguel Costa Santos (born 10 February 2003) is a Portuguese professional footballer who plays as a left winger or attacking midfielder for Primeira Liga club Famalicão.

== Club career ==
=== Benfica ===
Born in the village of Sanguedo in Santa Maria da Feira, Aveiro District, Santos started his career with Fiães before joining Benfica in 2016. He signed a professional contract with the latter club in March 2019.

Santos made his professional debut with Benfica's reserves in the Liga Portugal 2 on 14 December 2021, as a last-minute substitute in a 1–0 away win against Académico de Viseu. He scored his first goal in the competition the following 22 October, in the 2–0 victory at B-SAD.

Ahead of the 2024–25 season, Santos was loaned to Moreirense. He played his first Primeira Liga match on 11 August 2024, featuring 17 minutes of a 2–1 away win over Farense.

=== Famalicão ===
On 11 July 2025, Santos joined fellow top-division side Famalicão on a three-year deal. He scored his first goal on 25 January 2026, closing the 3–0 home defeat of Tondela through a bicycle kick when he was lying on the pitch.

== International career ==
Santos earned his first cap for Portugal at under-21 level on 8 September 2023, in a 3–0 win against Andorra in the 2025 UEFA European Championship qualifiers. The following 26 March, in the same stage, he scored a 20-minute hat-trick in the 5–1 victory over Croatia.

== Career statistics ==
As of 26 April 2022

| Club | Season | League | | | National Cup | | League Cup | | Other | | Total | |
| Club | Season | Division | Apps | Goals | Apps | Goals | Apps | Goals | Apps | Goals | Apps | Goals |
|---|---|---|---|---|---|---|---|---|---|---|---|---|
| Benfica B | 2021–22 | Liga Portugal 2 | 2 | 0 | – | | – | | 0 | 0 | 2 | 0 |
| Career total | | | 2 | 0 | 0 | 0 | 0 | 0 | 0 | 0 | 2 | 0 |

== Honours ==
Benfica

- UEFA Youth League: 2021–22
