= Luís Semedo =

Portuguese footballer

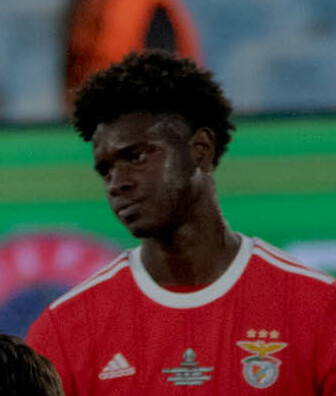
- Semedo with Benfica at the Under-20 Intercontinental Cup

Personal information
- Full name: Luís Hemir Silva Semedo
- Date of birth: 11 August 2003 (age 23)
- Place of birth: Lisbon, Portugal
- Height: 1.92 m (6 ft 4 in)
- Position: Striker

Team information
- Current team: Clermont Foot 63

Youth career
- 2015‒2023: Benfica

Senior career*
Years	Team	Apps	(Gls)
2021–2023	Benfica B	21	(2)
2023–2026	Sunderland	23	(0)
2024–2025	→ Juventus Next Gen (loan)	28	(3)
2025–2026	→ Moreirense (loan)	21	(3)
2026–	Clermont Foot 63	0	(0)

International career^{‡}
2021	Portugal U19	1	(0)
2022	Portugal U20	2	(0)
- * Club domestic league appearances and goals as of 1 August 2026 ‡ National team caps and goals as of 27 September 2022

Luís Hemir Silva Semedo (born 11 August 2003) is a Portuguese professional footballer who plays as a forward for Ligue 2 club Clermont Foot 63.

== Club career ==
=== Benfica B ===
Semedo began his football journey at Benfica, signing a youth contract with the club in 2018, as an under-17.

Progressing quickly through the ranks, he moved up to under-18 and under-19 teams during the following season, where he impressed with an average of more than one goal per game, the young footballer signed his first professional contract with As Águias in August 2020.

Having started to play with Benfica's under-23 in the Liga Revelação midway through the 2020–21 season, he became a regular starter and scorer with the team during the following one.

At that time he was also playing a major role in the Youth League, where the Benfica under-19 topped their group against Dynamo Kyiv, Barcelona and Bayern Munich, scoring a goal against the latter during a 2–0 away win in November 2021 and most notably during their last pool game, a 1–0 home win against the Ukrainian that earned them the top spot.

While having made his first trainings under first team coach Jorge Jesus, Semedo made his professional debut for Benfica B on 23 January 2022, replacing Duk during a Liga Portugal 2 home win against Penafiel.

Semedo scored the winning goal for Benfica at the 2022 Under-20 Intercontinental Cup.

=== Sunderland ===
On 18 June 2023, Semedo joined EFL Championship side Sunderland on a five-year contract, on a free transfer.

Semedo joined Serie C club Juventus Next Gen on 31 August 2024 on loan for the 2024–25 season. The deal included an option to purchase which was not exercised.

Semedo next joined Portuguese top division side Moreirense on loan.

=== Clermont Foot 63 ===
On 1 September 2026, Semedo permanently joined Ligue 2 club Clermont Foot 63.

== International career ==
Born in Portugal, Semedo is of Cape Verdean descent. He was selected with Portugal under-16 during the 2019–20 season, he later played with the under-19 in September 2021.

== Career statistics ==
As of match played 16 May 2026

Appearances and goals by club, season and competition
Club	Season	League			National cup		League cup (Note: Includes EFL Cup)		Other		Total	
Club	Season	Division	Apps	Goals	Apps	Goals	Apps	Goals	Apps	Goals	Apps	Goals
Benfica B	2021–22	Liga Portugal 2	3	0	—		—		—		3	0
Benfica B	2022–23	Liga Portugal 2	18	2	—		—		—		18	2
Benfica B	Total		21	2	0	0	0	0	0	0	21	2
Sunderland	2023–24	Championship	23	0	0	0	0	0	—		23	0
Sunderland	2024–25	Championship	0	0	0	0	1	0	—		1	0
Sunderland	2026–27	Premier League	0	0	0	0	0	0	—		0	0
Sunderland	Total		23	0	0	0	1	0	0	0	24	0
Juventus Next Gen (loan)	2024–25	Serie C	28	3	—		—		—		28	3
Moreirense (loan)	2025–26	Primeira Liga	21	3	0	0	—		—		21	3
Clermont Foot 63	2026–27	Ligue 2	0	0	0	0	—		—		0	0
Career total			80	6	0	0	1	0	0	0	81	6

== Honours ==
Benfica Youth

- UEFA Youth League: 2021–22
- Under-20 Intercontinental Cup: 2022
