= Ange Chibozo =

Beninese footballer (born 2003)

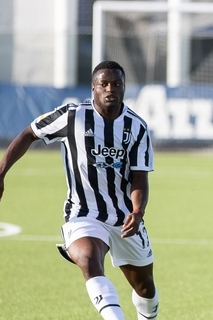
- Chibozo with Juventus U19 in 2021

Personal information
- Full name: Ange Josué Chibozo
- Date of birth: 1 July 2003 (age 23)
- Place of birth: Adromè, Mono, Benin
- Height: 1.75 m (5 ft 9 in)
- Positions: Forward; winger

Team information
- Current team: Ponferradina

Youth career
- 2014−2017: Inter Milan
- 2017: Giana Erminio
- 2017−2022: Juventus

Senior career*
| Years | Team | Apps | (Gls) |
| 2022–2023 | Juventus | 0 | (0) |
| 2022–2023 | → Amiens (loan) | 23 | (0) |
| 2023–2026 | Amiens | 15 | (2) |
| 2023–2024 | → Paços de Ferreira (loan) | 6 | (0) |
| 2025–2026 | Amiens B | 5 | (2) |
| 2026 | → Unionistas (loan) | 12 | (2) |
| 2026– | Ponferradina | 0 | (0) |

International career^{‡}
| 2022– | Benin | 2 | (0) |
- * Club domestic league appearances and goals as of 9 June 2026 ‡ National team caps and goals as of 22:33, 19 October 2023 (UTC)

Ange Josué Chibozo (born 1 July 2003) is a Beninese professional footballer who plays as a forward or winger for Spanish Primera Federación club Ponferradina , and the Beninese national team.

== Club career ==
=== Early career ===
Born in Benin, Chibozo moved to Italy in 2014. He started playing football aged 11 at Inter Milan's youth sector in 2014, before joining Giana Erminio in January 2017.

=== Juventus ===
Chibozo signed for Juventus in summer 2017. On 9 October 2021, Chibozo made his unofficial debut for the first team in a 2–1 friendly win against Alessandria, coming on as substitute in the 63rd minute and scoring the winning goal 30 minutes later. With eight appearances, Chibozo helped the U19s reach the 2021–22 UEFA Youth League semifinals, their best-ever placing in the competition. He scored against Malmö FF and against Zenit in the group stage and he scored against Liverpool in the quarter-finals and against Benfica in the semi-finals. Chibozo ended the season with 21 goals scored in all competitions.

=== Amiens ===
On 1 July 2022, Chibozo left Juventus and joined Ligue 2 side Amiens on a season-long loan with an obligation-to-buy reported to be around €1 million.

He subsequently made his professional debut on 30 July, coming in as a substitute for Mamadou Fofana at the 76th minute of a 3-0 league loss against Metz.

On 31 January 2023, Spanish club Real Murcia announced the signing of Chibozo on loan until the end of the season. However, four days later, Chibozo's agent announced that the transfer had not happened, and that the player would remain at Amiens.

==== Paços de Ferreira (loan) ====
On 28 August 2023, Amiens sent Chibozo on loan to recently relegated to Liga Portugal 2 club Paços de Ferreira.

==== Unionistas (loan) ====
On 21 January 2026, Chibozo moved on loan to Unionistas in the Spanish third-tier Primera Federación.

== International career ==
On 14 March 2022, Chibozo received his first senior call-up from the Beninese national team. He then made his international debut on 27 March, featuring in a 2–1 win against Zambia.

== Style of play ==
Chibozo is a forward, who can play on the left or centrally. His main attributes are his pace, his ability as a free-kick taker, his dribbling and his technique.

== Career statistics ==
=== International ===
As of match played 22 March 2023

Appearances and goals by national team and year
| National team | Year | Apps | Goals |
|---|---|---|---|
| Benin | 2022 | 1 | 0 |
| Benin | 2023 | 1 | 0 |
| Total | | 2 | 0 |
