= Diogo Abreu (footballer) =

Portuguese footballer

Personal information
- Full name: Diogo Filipe Pacheco Abreu
- Date of birth: 4 January 2003 (age 23)
- Place of birth: Paços de Ferreira, Portugal
- Height: 1.86 m (6 ft 1 in)
- Position: Midfielder

Team information
- Current team: Al-Waab
- Number: 8

Youth career
- –2012: Paços de Ferreira
- 2012–2022: FC Porto

Senior career*
Years	Team	Apps	(Gls)
2021–2022	FC Porto B	9	(1)
2022–2024	Sporting CP B	42	(4)
2025	Lokomotiv Plovdiv	12	(1)
2025–	Al-Waab	2	(0)

International career^{‡}
2018	Portugal U15	5	(0)
2018–2019	Portugal U16	8	(0)
2019–2020	Portugal U17	8	(0)
2021	Portugal U18	2	(0)
2021–	Portugal U19	4	(0)
2022–	Portugal U20	1	(0)
- * Club domestic league appearances and goals as of 14 June 2025 ‡ National team caps and goals as of 1 May 2025

Diogo Abreu (born 4 January 2003) is a Portuguese professional footballer who plays for Al-Waab as a midfielder.

== Club career ==
Diogo Abreu made his professional debut for FC Porto B on the 19 September 2021.
