= Marcos Sánchez (footballer, born 2003) =

Spanish footballer

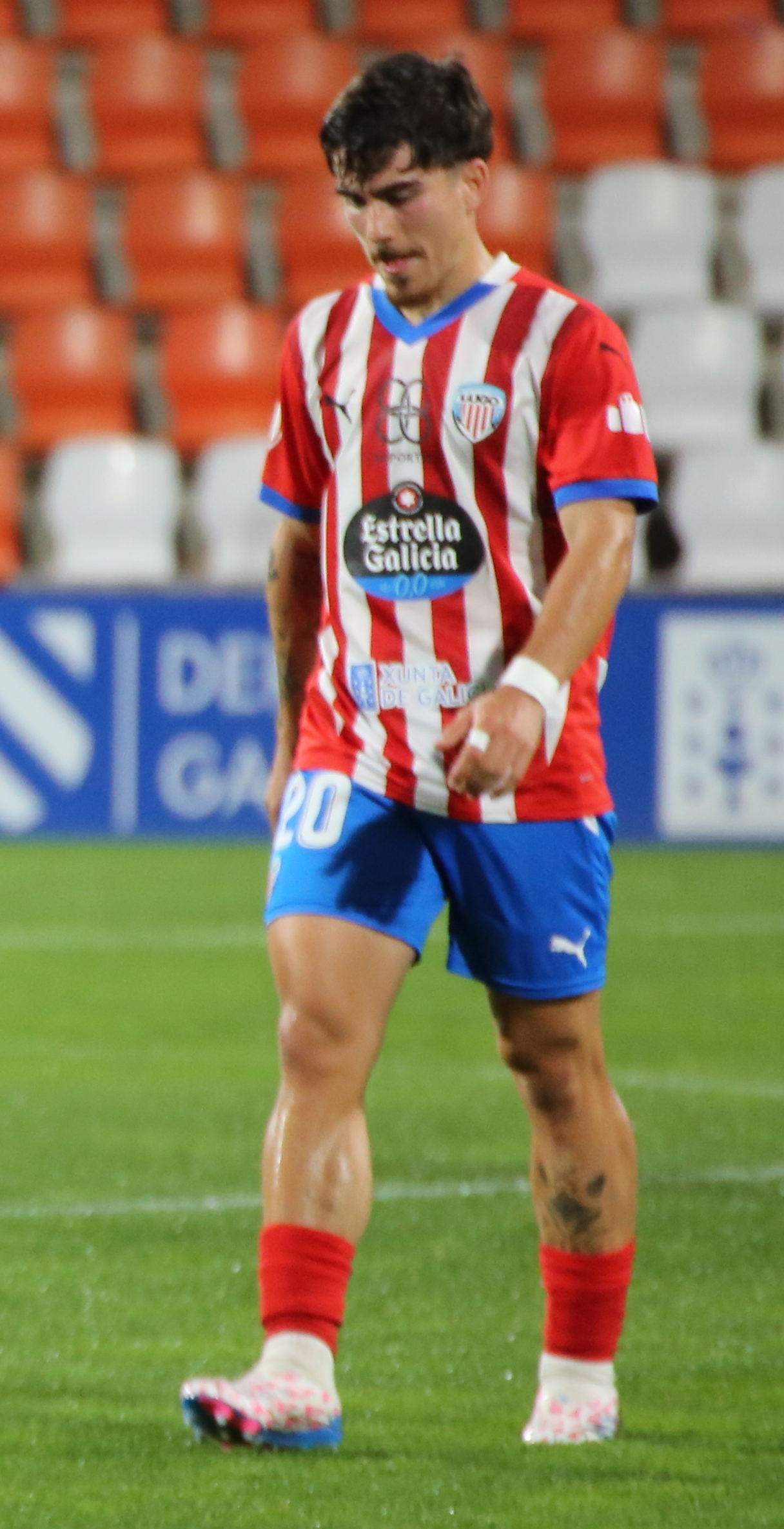
- Sánchez with Lugo in 2024

Personal information
- Full name: Marcos Sánchez Arriero
- Date of birth: 26 October 2003 (age 23)
- Place of birth: Villarreal, Spain
- Height: 1.78 m (5 ft 10 in)
- Position: Right back

Team information
- Current team: Numancia
- Number: 2

Youth career
- 2007–2019: Villarreal
- 2019–2020: Roda
- 2020–2021: Villarreal

Senior career*
Years	Team	Apps	(Gls)
2021–2023	Villarreal C	51	(3)
2023–2024	Villarreal B	5	(0)
2024–2025	Lugo	21	(1)
2025–	Numancia	18	(0)

International career
2019	Spain U16	4	(0)
2021	Spain U19	2	(0)
- * Club domestic league appearances and goals as of 7 May 2026

Marcos Sánchez Arriero (born 26 October 2003) is a Spanish footballer who plays for Segunda Federación club Numancia. Mainly a right back, he can also play as a central midfielder.

== Club career ==
Born in Villarreal, Castellón, Valencian Community, Sánchez joined Villarreal CF's youth setup in 2007, aged four. He made his senior debut with the C-team on 2 May 2021, coming on as a late substitute in a 1–0 Tercera División home win over UD Benigànim.

Sánchez was definitely promoted to the C's ahead of the 2021–22 Tercera División RFEF season, and scored his first senior goal on 27 November 2021, netting the winner in a 2–1 away success over FC Jove Español San Vicente. On 10 September 2022, he renewed his contract with the club until 2025.

In September 2023, Sánchez was promoted to the reserves in Segunda División. He made his professional debut on 4 November, replacing Lanchi late into a 3–0 home loss to Sporting de Gijón.

== International career ==
Sánchez represented Spain at under-16 and under-19 levels.
