= Samuel Justo =

Portuguese footballer (born 2004)

Personal information
- Full name: Samuel Loureiro Carvalho Justo
- Date of birth: 2 April 2004 (age 22)
- Place of birth: Amadora, Portugal
- Height: 1.78 m (5 ft 10 in)
- Position: Midfielder

Team information
- Current team: Sporting CP B
- Number: 96

Youth career
- Sport Túlias de Alcoitão - AASC
- 2013–2022: Sporting CP

Senior career*
Years	Team	Apps	(Gls)
2022–	Sporting CP B	70	(7)
2023–2024	→ Casa Pia (loan)	21	(1)
2025	→ Farense (loan)	5	(0)

International career^{‡}
2019	Portugal U16	3	(0)
2021–2022	Portugal U18	15	(6)
2022–2023	Portugal U19	9	(0)
2023–2024	Portugal U20	7	(0)
Medal record
Men's football
Representing Portugal
UEFA European Under-19 Championship
Runner-up	2023 Malta
- * Club domestic league appearances and goals as of 20 June 2026 ‡ National team caps and goals as of 21 March 2024

Samuel Loureiro Carvalho Justo (born 2 April 2004) is a Portuguese professional footballer who plays as a midfielder for Liga Portugal 2 team Sporting CP B.

== Club career ==
Born in Amadora, Justo began his career at the Sport Túlias de Alcoitão, before joining the academy of professional side Sporting CP at the age of nine, in 2013. He signed his first professional contract in October 2020, and renewed this deal in August 2022, being assigned to the club's B team.

In August 2023 he was loaned to Primeira Liga side Casa Pia.

On 23 January 2025, Justo moved on loan to Farense in Primeira Liga.

== International career ==
Justo has represented Portugal at youth international level.

== Career statistics ==
=== Club ===
As of 11 November 2023

Appearances and goals by club, season and competition
Club	Season	League			National cup		League cup		Other		Total	
Club	Season	Division	Apps	Goals	Apps	Goals	Apps	Goals	Apps	Goals	Apps	Goals
Sporting CP B	2022–23	Liga 3	22	3	—		—		0	0	22	3
Sporting CP B	2023–24	Liga 3	3	0	—		—		0	0	3	0
Sporting CP B	Total		25	3	0	0	0	0	0	0	25	3
Casa Pia (loan)	2023–24	Primeira Liga	7	0	1 (Note: Appearances in the Taça de Portugal)	0	2 (Note: Appearances in the Taça da Liga)	0	0	0	10	0
Career total			32	3	1	0	2	0	0	0	35	3
