= Antonio Pacheco (footballer, born 2002) =

Spanish footballer

Personal information
- Full name: Antonio Pacheco Ruiz
- Date of birth: 3 January 2002 (age 24)
- Place of birth: Callosa de Segura, Spain
- Height: 1.82 m (6 ft 0 in)
- Position: Midfielder

Team information
- Current team: Albacete
- Number: 6

Youth career
- Kelme
- Villarreal
- 2018–2019: Roda
- 2019–2020: Villarreal

Senior career*
Years	Team	Apps	(Gls)
2018	Roda	1	(0)
2020–2021	Villarreal C	14	(3)
2020–2023	Villarreal B	75	(5)
2023–	Albacete	91	(1)

International career
2019	Spain U17	2	(0)
- * Club domestic league appearances and goals as of 9 June 2026

Antonio Pacheco Ruiz (born 3 January 2002) is a Spanish footballer who plays as a central midfielder for Albacete Balompié.

== Club career ==
Born in Callosa de Segura, Alicante, Valencian Community, Pacheco joined Villarreal CF's youth setup from Kelme CF. He made his senior debut with affiliate club CD Roda on 11 November 2018, coming on as a second-half substitute in a 3–0 Tercera División away loss against CD Eldense.

In 2020, after finishing his formation, Pacheco was assigned to Villarreal's C-team also in the fourth division, but also featured for the reserves in Segunda División B during the season. On 29 January 2021, he renewed his contract with the Yellow Submarine until 2025.

Pacheco featured regularly for the B-side during the 2021–22 campaign, as his side achieved promotion to Segunda División. He made his professional debut in the category on 29 August 2022, replacing Diego Collado in a 3–0 away loss against Granada CF.

Pacheco scored his first professional goal on 7 October 2022, but in a 3–1 loss at Sporting de Gijón. On 8 July of the following year, he moved to fellow second division side Albacete Balompié on a four-year contract.
