= Benjamin Atiabou =

Austrian footballer (born 2004)

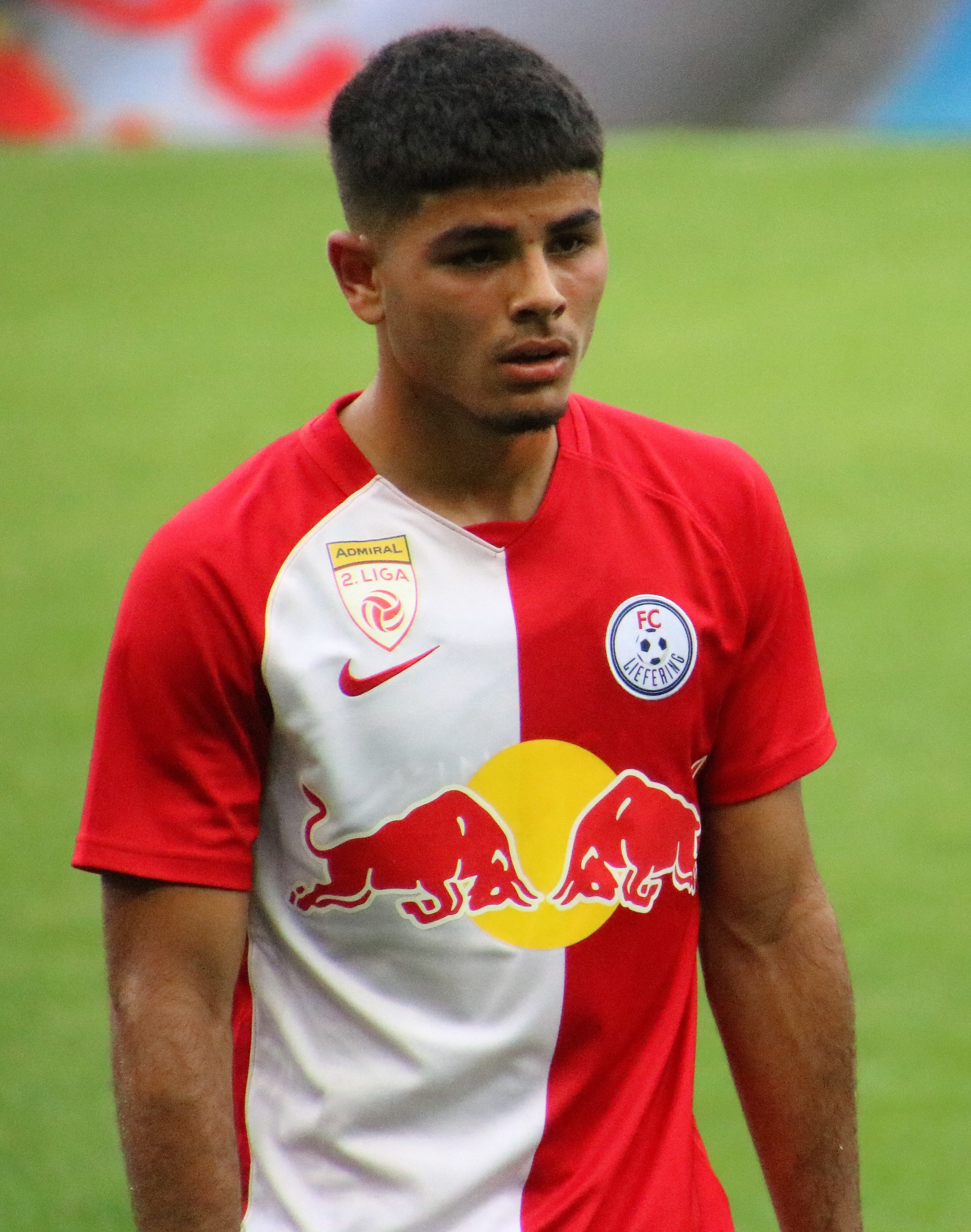
- Atiabou with FC Liefering in 2021

Personal information
- Date of birth: 19 January 2004 (age 22)
- Height: 1.78 m (5 ft 10 in)
- Position: Right-back

Team information
- Current team: Werder Bremen II
- Number: 37

Youth career
- 2008–2009: Salzburger AK 1914
- 2009–2012: Red Bull Salzburg
- 2012–2016: FC Liefering
- 2016–2021: Red Bull Salzburg

Senior career*
Years	Team	Apps	(Gls)
2021–2024	Red Bull Salzburg	0	(0)
2021–2024	→ FC Liefering (loan)	44	(5)
2024–	Werder Bremen II	14	(0)

International career^{‡}
2019	Austria U15	8	(1)
2019	Austria U16	6	(0)
2021	Austria U18	7	(0)
- * Club domestic league appearances and goals as of 20 June 2026 ‡ National team caps and goals as of 6 December 2021

Benjamin Atiabou (born 19 January 2004) is an Austrian professional footballer who plays as a right-back for Regionalliga Nord club Werder Bremen II.

== Club career ==
Atiabou played in the Red Bull Salzburg system from 2009. He became a regular for FC Liefering during the 2021–22 season.

On 3 September 2024, Atiabou joined German Regionalliga Nord club Werder Bremen II.

== International career ==
Born in Salzburg, Atiabou is of Moroccan descent. He was called up to the Morocco U17s for a training camp in October 2020. He is a youth international for Austria, having played up to the Austria U18s.

== Career statistics ==
=== Club ===
As of 28 May 2021

Appearances and goals by club, season and competition
Club	Season	League			Cup		Continental		Other		Total	
Club	Season	Division	Apps	Goals	Apps	Goals	Apps	Goals	Apps	Goals	Apps	Goals
Red Bull Salzburg	2021–22	Bundesliga	0	0	0	0	0	0	0	0	0	0
FC Liefering (loan)	2021–22	2. Liga	1	0	0	0	–		0	0	1	0
Career total			1	0	0	0	0	0	0	0	1	0
