= Albin Thaqi =

German footballer (born 2002)

Personal information
- Date of birth: 28 March 2002 (age 24)
- Height: 1.85 m (6 ft 1 in)
- Position: Centre-back

Team information
- Current team: SG Wattenscheid 09
- Number: 4

Youth career
- –2013: Borussia Dortmund
- 2013–2017: Schalke 04
- 2017–2021: Borussia Dortmund

Senior career*
Years	Team	Apps	(Gls)
2021–2022	Borussia Dortmund II	11	(1)
2022	Fortuna Köln	6	(0)
2022	Fortuna Köln II	1	(0)
2022–2024	TuS Bövinghausen	33	(2)
2024–2025	Sportfreunde Lotte	35	(1)
2025–	SG Wattenscheid 09	38	(3)

International career
2017	Germany U16	2	(0)
- * Club domestic league appearances and goals as of 23 September 2026

Albin Thaqi (born 28 March 2002) is a German professional footballer who plays as a defender for Regionalliga West club SG Wattenscheid 09.

== Club career ==
Thaqi started his youth career with Borussia Dortmund before joining their rivals Schalke 04 in 2013. He returned to Dortmund in 2017. He made his debut for Borussia Dortmund II on 27 March 2021 in a 1–0 league win against Fortuna Düsseldorf II. He scored his first goal on 24 April in a 3–3 draw against Schalke 04 II. Following their promotion to 3. Liga after 2020–21 season, he made his professional debut on 31 July 2021 in a 1–1 draw against Waldhof Mannheim.

On 31 January 2022, Thaqi moved to Fortuna Köln in Regionalliga West.

== International career ==
Thaqi is a German youth international. He has played two friendlies for under-16 team in 2017.

== Personal life ==
Thaqi is of Kosovan descent.

== Career statistics ==
=== Club ===
As of 31 July 2021

Appearances and goals by club, season and competition
Club	Season	League			Cup		Continental		Total	
Club	Season	Division	Apps	Goals	Apps	Goals	Apps	Goals	Apps	Goals
Borussia Dortmund II	2020–21	Regionalliga West	8	1	—		—		8	1
Borussia Dortmund II	2021–22	3. Liga	1	0	—		—		1	0
Career total			9	1	0	0	0	0	9	1

== Honours ==
Borussia Dortmund II

- Regionalliga West: 2020–21
