= Vladyslav Pohorilyi =

Ukrainian footballer

Personal information
- Full name: Vladyslav Vitaliyovych Pohorilyi
- Date of birth: 3 September 2003 (age 23)
- Place of birth: Vinnytsia, Ukraine
- Height: 1.83 m (6 ft 0 in)
- Position: Centre-forward

Team information
- Current team: Nyva Vinnytsia

Youth career
- 2013–2014: DYuSSh-2 Vinnytsia
- 2015–2017: Nyva Vinnytsia
- 2017–2019: Shakhtar Donetsk

Senior career*
Years	Team	Apps	(Gls)
2019–2023	Shakhtar Donetsk	0	(0)
2023	→ Zorya Luhansk (loan)	11	(1)
2023–2025	Oleksandriya	21	(1)
2024	→ Oleksandriya-2	7	(3)
2025	Rukh Lviv	4	(0)
2025–	Nyva Vinnytsia		
- * Club domestic league appearances and goals as of 14 June 2025

Vladyslav Vitaliyovych Pohorilyi (Ukrainian: Владислав Віталійович Погорілий; born 3 September 2003) is a Ukrainian professional footballer who plays as a centre-forward.

== Early life ==
Pohorilyi was a product of the Nyva Vinnytsia and Shakhtar Donetsk academies.

== Club career ==
=== Shakhtar Donetsk ===
Pohorilyi started his professional career with Shakhtar Donetsk.

==== Loan to Zorya Luhansk ====
In March 2023 he went on loan to Zorya Luhansk in the Ukrainian Premier League. He made his league debut for Zorya Luhansk as a substitute against Vorskla Poltava on 5 March.

== International career ==
Pohorilyi has been called up to represent Ukraine at youth level.

== Style of play ==
Pohorilyi mainly operates as a striker and is known for his goalscoring ability.
