= Rafael Rodrigues =

Portuguese footballer

Personal information
- Full name: Rafael Vela Rodrigues
- Date of birth: 27 January 2002 (age 24)
- Place of birth: Oliveira do Bairro, Portugal
- Height: 1.81 m (5 ft 11 in)
- Position: Left-back

Team information
- Current team: Al Ain (on loan from Benfica B)
- Number: 2

Youth career
- 2010–2014: CB Estarreja
- 2014–2022: Benfica

Senior career*
| Years | Team | Apps | (Gls) |
| 2021– | Benfica B | 76 | (1) |
| 2024–2025 | → AVS (loan) | 21 | (1) |
| 2025– | → Al Ain (loan) | 16 | (0) |

International career^{‡}
| 2017–2018 | Portugal U16 | 6 | (0) |
| 2018–2019 | Portugal U17 | 6 | (0) |
| 2020 | Portugal U18 | 3 | (0) |
| 2020 | Portugal U19 | 1 | (0) |
| 2021–2022 | Portugal U20 | 9 | (0) |
| 2022– | Portugal U21 | 6 | (0) |
- * Club domestic league appearances and goals as of 16 March 2026 ‡ National team caps and goals as of 18:34, 20 November 2023 (UTC)

Rafael Vela Rodrigues (born 27 January 2002) is a Portuguese professional footballer who plays as a left-back for Al Ain on loan from Benfica B.

== International career ==
Rodrigues has represented Portugal at youth international level.

== Career statistics ==
=== Club ===
As of match played 8 October 2023

Appearances and goals by club, season and competition
| Club | Season | League | | | National cup | | League cup | | Total | |
| Club | Season | Division | Apps | Goals | Apps | Goals | Apps | Goals | Apps | Goals |
|---|---|---|---|---|---|---|---|---|---|---|
| Benfica B | 2020–21 | Liga Portugal 2 | 1 | 0 | — | | — | | 1 | 0 |
| Benfica B | 2021–22 | Liga Portugal 2 | 16 | 0 | — | | — | | 16 | 0 |
| Benfica B | 2022–23 | Liga Portugal 2 | 31 | 0 | — | | — | | 31 | 0 |
| Benfica B | 2023–24 | Liga Portugal 2 | 6 | 0 | — | | — | | 6 | 0 |
| Benfica B | Total | | 54 | 0 | — | | — | | 54 | 0 |
| Career total | | | 54 | 0 | 0 | 0 | 0 | 0 | 54 | 0 |

== Honours ==
Benfica

- UEFA Youth League: 2021–22
- Under-20 Intercontinental Cup: 2022

Al Ain

- UAE Pro League: 2025–26
- UAE President's Cup: 2025–26
