= Marvel (footballer) =

Spanish footballer (born 2003)

Personal information
- Full name: Marvelous Antolín Garzón
- Date of birth: 7 January 2003 (age 23)
- Place of birth: Casablanca, Morocco
- Height: 1.81 m (5 ft 11 in)
- Position: Defender

Team information
- Current team: Leganés
- Number: 2

Youth career
- 2010–2011: Real Madrid
- 2011–2012: Atlético Madrid
- 2012–2015: Alcalá
- 2015–2016: Rayo Vallecano
- 2016–2022: Real Madrid

Senior career*
Years	Team	Apps	(Gls)
2021–2025	Real Madrid B	48	(1)
2024–2025	→ Córdoba (loan)	27	(0)
2025–	Leganés	36	(0)

International career^{‡}
2021–2022	Spain U19	3	(0)
- * Club domestic league appearances and goals as of 9 June 2026 ‡ National team caps and goals as of 21:06, 25 September 2022 (UTC)

Marvelous Antolín Garzón (born 7 January 2003), commonly known as Marvel, is a footballer playing as a defender for Segunda División club Leganés. Born in Morocco, he is a youth international for Spain.

== Club career ==
=== Early career ===
Born in Casablanca, Morocco to a Nigerian mother, who brought him to Spain as a baby, Marvel was adopted by a Spanish family at the age of three.

Initially starting his career at Real Madrid, he played for Atlético Madrid, Alcalá and Rayo Vallecano before a return to Real in 2016. A left-footed central defender, he is noted for his imposing frame and ability to move the ball out from the back.

Marvel made three appearances for the Real Madrid Castilla team in October 2021, and was personally praised by Florentino Pérez for his performance in a 0–0 draw with Barcelona B. He has been called up to Real Madrid first team training on a number of occasions.

On 27 August 2024, Marvel was loaned to Segunda División side Córdoba for the season. He made his professional debut on 2 September, starting in a 3–1 away loss to Elche CF.

=== Leganés ===
On 22 July 2025, Marvel made a permanent move to Segunda División club Leganés, signing a three-year deal.

== International career ==
Despite being born in Morocco, Marvel has a Spanish passport . He has represented Spain at under-19 level.

== Career statistics ==
=== Club ===
As of match played 13 September 2024.

Appearances and goals by club, season and competition
Club	Season	League			Cup		Other		Total	
Club	Season	Division	Apps	Goals	Apps	Goals	Apps	Goals	Apps	Goals
Real Madrid Castilla	2021–22	Primera División RFEF	6	0	—		—		6	0
Real Madrid Castilla	2022–23	Primera Federación	27	1	—		4 (Note: Appearances in 2023 Primera Federación play-offs)	0	31	1
Real Madrid Castilla	2023–24	Primera Federación	15	0	—		—		15	0
Real Madrid Castilla	Total		48	1	0	0	4	0	52	1
Córdoba (loan)	2024–25	Segunda División	3	0	0	0	0	0	3	0
Career total			51	1	0	0	4	0	55	1

=== Honours ===
Real Madrid

- UEFA Champions League: 2023–24

FIFA Club World Cup 2022
