= Nicolò Turco =

Italian footballer (born 2004)

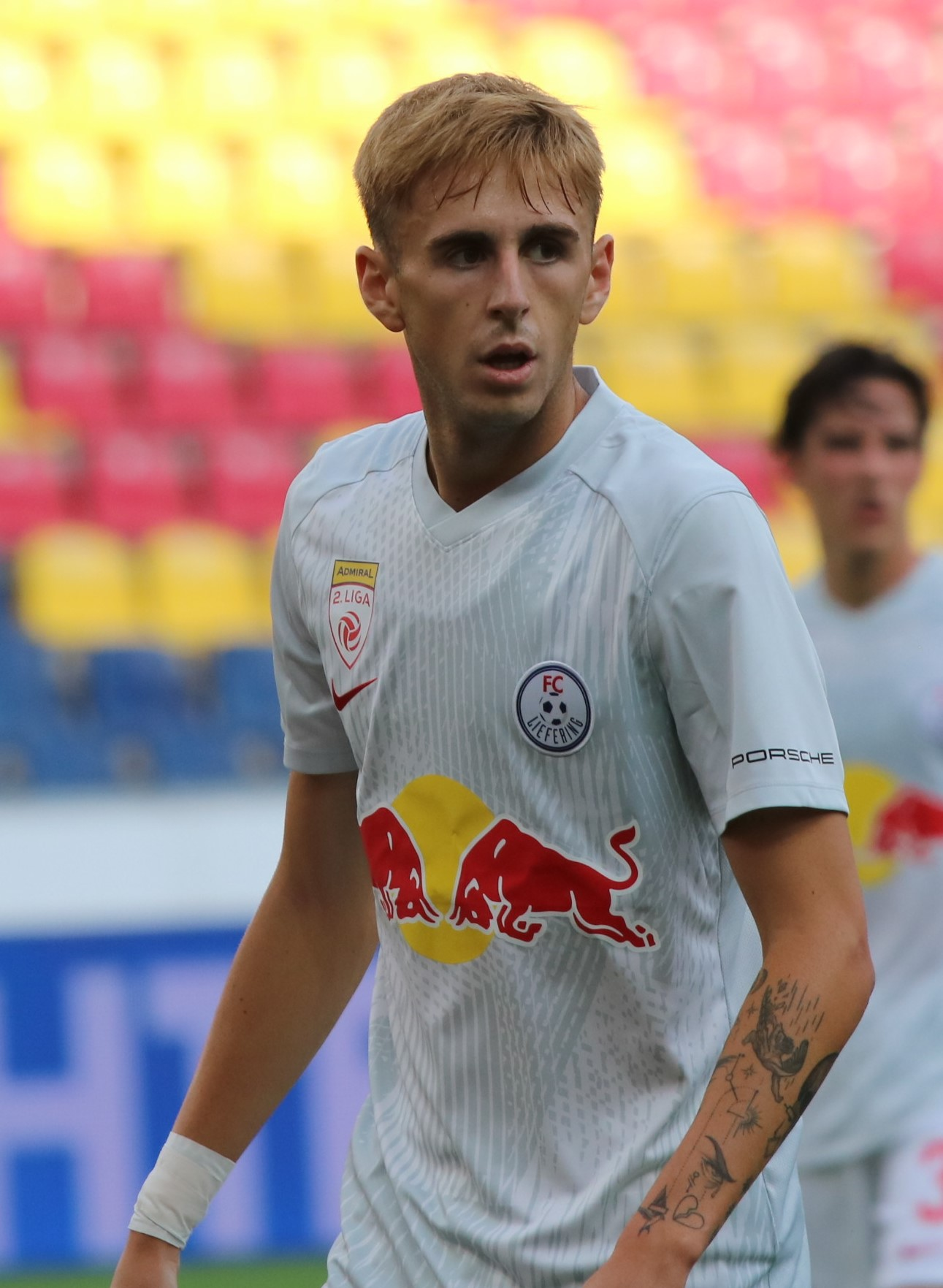
- Turco in 2023

Personal information
- Date of birth: 15 January 2004 (age 22)
- Place of birth: Tortona, Italy
- Height: 1.93 m (6 ft 4 in)
- Position: Striker

Team information
- Current team: Lentigione
- Number: 33

Youth career
- –2018: Genoa
- 2018–2023: Juventus
- 2024–2025: → AC Milan (loan)

Senior career*
Years	Team	Apps	(Gls)
2023–2025	Red Bull Salzburg	0	(0)
2023–2024	→ FC Liefering (loan)	13	(1)
2024–2025	→ Milan Futuro (res.) (loan)	20	(1)
2025–2026	Derthona	15	(4)
2026–	Lentigione	3	(0)

International career^{‡}
2019	Italy U15	8	(2)
2019–2020	Italy U16	11	(5)
2021	Italy U18	1	(0)
2022–2023	Italy U19	8	(0)
2023	Italy U20	3	(0)
Medal record
Men's football
Representing Italy
UEFA European Under-19 Championship
Winner	2023 Malta
- * Club domestic league appearances and goals as of 23:55, 25 October 2026 (UTC) ‡ National team caps and goals as of 05:28, 2 January 2024 (UTC)

Nicolò Turco (born 15 January 2004) is an Italian professional footballer who plays as a striker for Serie D Group D club Lentigione. He is a former Italy youth international.

== Early life ==
Turco is a native of Tortona, Italy.

== Club career ==
As a youth, Turco played for the youth academy of Italian club Genoa, on 2018, he moved to the youth academy of Italian Serie A side Juventus, where he was regarded as one of the club's most important players.

On 27 July 2023, Turco moved to Austria and joined Red Bull Salzburg on a contract until 2028, for a €2.75 million transfer fee, a day later he was loaned to the reserve team FC Liefering until 2025.

On 29 August 2024, Turco moved back to his native Italy, and joined AC Milan on a season-long loan with an option to buy, he was assigned to the newly created reserve team Milan Futuro. On 22 September 2024, he featured with the primavera squad on a 3–1 away win Campionato Primavera 1 match against Inter Milan.

Following the conclusion of the 2024–25 season, Turco returned to Red Bull Salzburg and on 18 July 2025 he agreed to an early contract termination with the club, making him a free agent ahead of the 2025–26 season.

On 21 October 25, he signed with Serie D club Derthona as a free agent.

On October 2026, he signed with Serie D club Lentigione, as a free agent.

== International career ==
Turco has represented Italy at various youth levels internationally, having featured with the U15, U16, U18, U19 and U20s. He helped the Italy national under-19 football team win the 2023 UEFA European Under-19 Championship.

== Style of play ==
Turco mainly operates as a striker and has been described as "very tall player who is good with his head, as also demonstrated in the Italy national team against Qatar, but who, as mentioned, does not disdain that type of atypical work if it is a center forward with his physical qualities".

== Career statistics ==
=== Club ===
As of match played 15 March 2026

Appearances and goals by club, season and competition
Club	Season	League			National cup		Europe		Other		Total	
Club	Season	Division	Apps	Goals	Apps	Goals	Apps	Goals	Apps	Goals	Apps	Goals
FC Liefering (loan)	2023–24	2. Liga	13	1	0	0	0	0	—		13	1
FC Liefering (loan)	Total		13	1	0	0	0	0	—		13	1
Milan Futuro (loan)	2024–25	Serie C	20	1	1 (Note: Appearance in Coppa Italia Serie C)	0	—		2 (Note: Appearances in Serie C play-out)	0	23	1
Milan Futuro (loan)	Total		20	1	1	0	—		2	0	23	1
Derthona	2025–26	Serie D	15	4	—		—		0	0	15	4
Derthona	Total		15	4	0	0	—		0	0	15	4
Career total			48	6	1	0	0	0	2	0	51	6

== Honours ==
Italy U19

- UEFA European Under-19 Championship: 2023
