= David González (footballer, born 2002) =

Spanish footballer

Personal information
- Full name: David González Ballesteros
- Date of birth: 22 June 2002 (age 24)
- Place of birth: Burgos, Spain
- Height: 1.80 m (5 ft 11 in)
- Position: Midfielder

Team information
- Current team: Burgos
- Number: 14

Youth career
- 2010–2017: Burgos
- 2017–2019: Numancia
- 2019–2021: Real Madrid

Senior career*
Years	Team	Apps	(Gls)
2021–2024	Real Madrid B	44	(1)
2022–2023	→ Numancia (loan)	12	(1)
2024–	Burgos	70	(14)
- * Club domestic league appearances and goals as of 6 June 2026

David González Ballesteros (born 22 June 2002) is a Spanish footballer who plays as a midfielder for Burgos CF.

== Career ==
Born in Burgos, Castile and León, González played for hometown side Burgos CF and CD Numancia before joining Real Madrid's La Fábrica on 21 June 2019. He made his senior debut with the reserves on 24 April 2021, coming on as a second-half substitute for Peter González in a 2–0 Segunda División B away loss to Extremadura UD.

On 2 June 2021, González renewed his contract with Los Blancos, being definitely promoted to Castilla in Primera División RFEF, and was called up to the pre-season with the main squad in the following month. On 26 July 2022, after just four starts during the 2021–22 season, he was loaned to fellow third division side CD Numancia for one year.

González immediately became a starter with the Numantinos, but suffered a knee injury in November 2022 which kept him sidelined for the remainder of the campaign. Back to Castilla in July 2023, he was mainly a backup option.

On 16 July 2024, González returned to his first club Burgos, signing a three-year contract and being assigned to the main squad in Segunda División. He made his professional debut on 18 August, replacing Álex Sancris late into a 3–1 home win over FC Cartagena.
