= 2021–22 UEFA Youth League =

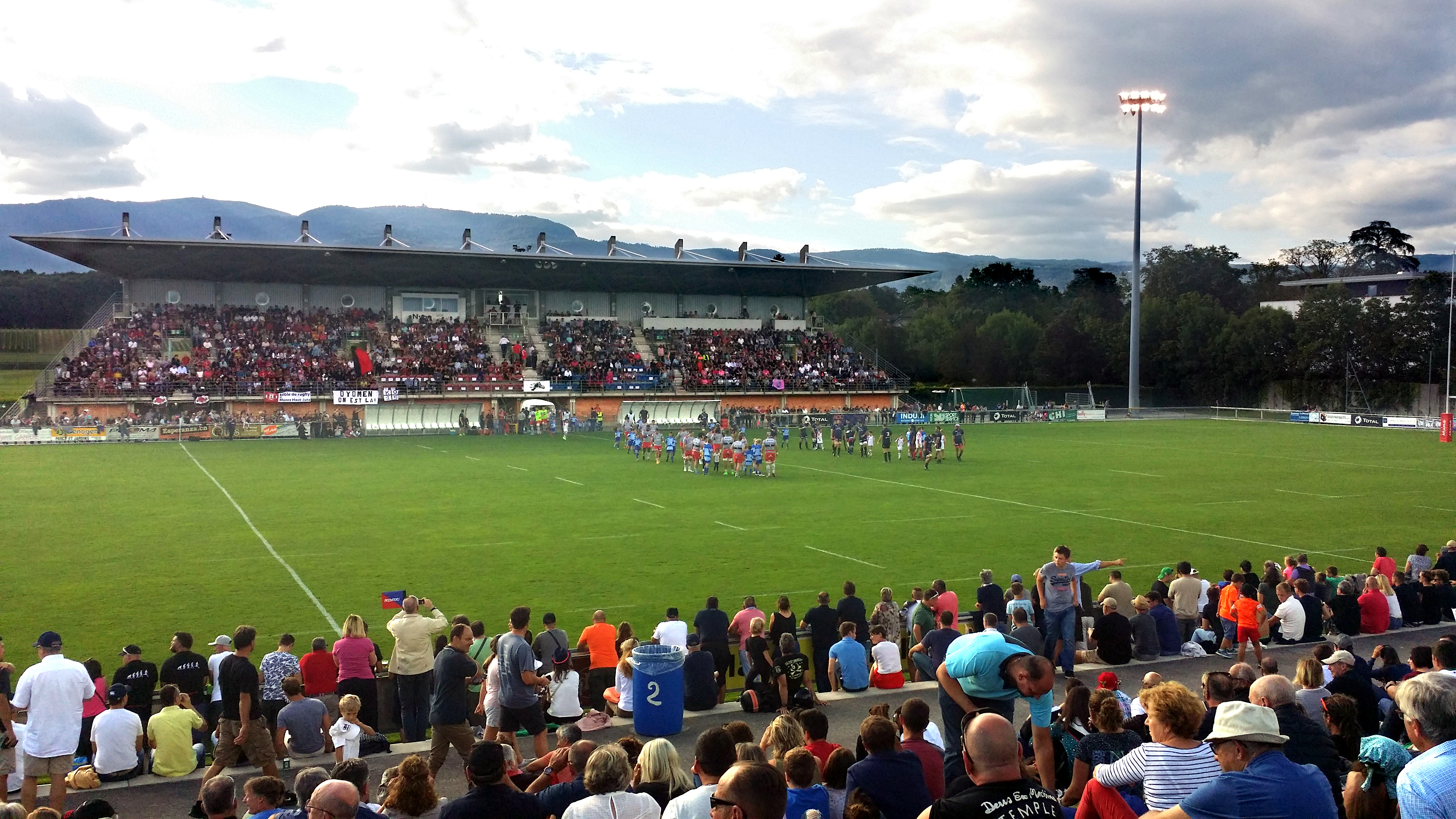
- The Colovray Stadium in Nyon hosted the semi-finals and final.

Tournament details
- Dates: 14 September 2021 – 25 April 2022
- Teams: 64 (from 39 associations)

Final positions
- Champions: (Portugal) Benfica (1st title)
- Runners-up: (Austria) FC Salzburg

Tournament statistics
- Matches played: 167
- Goals scored: 571 (3.42 per match)
- Top scorer(s): Mads Hansen (Midtjylland); Aral Simsir (Midtjylland); Roko Šimić (FC Salzburg); 7 goals each

The 2021–22 UEFA Youth League was the eighth season of the UEFA Youth League, a European youth club football competition organised by UEFA.

Real Madrid, having won the title in 2019–20, were the title holders, since the 2020–21 edition was cancelled due to the COVID-19 pandemic in Europe and the title was not awarded. They were eliminated by city rivals Atlético Madrid in the round of 16.

Portuguese side Benfica won their first title, beating FC Salzburg 6–0 in the final. This was a replay of the 2017 final, won by Salzburg by 2–1. It was also Benfica's first title in European football since the 1961–62 European Cup.

As champions, Benfica, played against the CONMEBOL champion, Peñarol, for the new U-20 Intercontinental Cup, a youth team equivalent to the former Intercontinental Cup, which featured the senior club champions of Europe and South America. Benfica won the match 1–0.

== Teams ==
A total of 64 teams from at least 32 of the 55 UEFA member associations may enter the tournament. They are split into two sections, each with 32 teams.

- UEFA Champions League Path: The youth teams of the 32 clubs which qualified for the 2021–22 UEFA Champions League group stage entered the UEFA Champions League Path. If there was a vacancy (youth teams not entering), it was filled by a team defined by UEFA.
- Domestic Champions Path: The youth domestic champions of the top 32 associations according to their 2021 UEFA country coefficients entered the Domestic Champions Path. If there was a vacancy (associations with no youth domestic competition, as well as youth domestic champions already included in the UEFA Champions League path), it was first filled by the title holders should they have not yet qualified, and then by the youth domestic champions of the next association in the UEFA ranking.

Akademia e Futbollit, Angers, Deportivo La Coruña, Daugavpils, Empoli, Hajduk Split, 1. FC Köln, Csíkszereda, Pogoń Szczecin, St Patrick's Athletic, Trabzonspor, Žalgiris and Zvijezda 09 will make their tournament debuts. Lithuania will be represented for the first time.

Qualified teams for 2021–22 UEFA Youth League
Rank	Association	Teams	
Rank	Association	UEFA Champions League Path	Domestic Champions Path
1	England	Manchester City (2020–21 U18 Premier League); Manchester United; Liverpool; Chelsea	
2	Spain	Atlético Madrid; Real Madrid; Barcelona; Sevilla; Villarreal	Deportivo La Coruña (2020–21 División de Honor Juvenil U-19)
3	Germany	Bayern Munich; RB Leipzig; Borussia Dortmund; VfL Wolfsburg	1. FC Köln (2019–20 U19 A-Junioren-Bundesliga)
4	Italy	Inter Milan; Milan; Atalanta; Juventus	Empoli (2020–21 Campionato Primavera 1)
5	France	Lille; Paris Saint-Germain	Angers (2019–20 Championnat National U19)
6	Portugal	Sporting CP; Porto; Benfica (2019–20 Campeonato Nacional Juniores S19)	
7	Russia	Zenit Saint Petersburg (2020–21 Russian Youth Football League U17)	
8	Belgium	Club Brugge	Genk (2019–20 Belgian U18 League)
9	Ukraine	Dynamo Kyiv; Shakhtar Donetsk (2020–21 Ukrainian U19 League)	
10	Netherlands	Ajax	AZ (2019–20 Eredivisie U19)
11	Turkey	Beşiktaş	Trabzonspor (2020–21 U19 Elit)
12	Austria	FC Salzburg (2020–21 Jugendliga U18)	
13	Denmark		Midtjylland (2020–21 U19 Ligaen)
14	Scotland		Rangers (2020–21 Scottish U18 League)
15	Czech Republic		Sparta Prague (2020–21 Czech U19 League)
16	Cyprus		APOEL (2020–21 Cypriot U19 League)
17	Switzerland	Young Boys (2020–21 Swiss U18 League)	
18	Greece		PAOK (2020–21 Superleague K19)
19	Serbia		Red Star Belgrade (2020–21 Serbian U19 League)
20	Croatia		Hajduk Split (2020–21 1. HNL Juniori U19)
21	Sweden	Malmö FF	Hammarby IF (2020 P17 Allsvenskan)
22	Norway		Rosenborg (2020 Norwegian U19 Cup)
23	Israel		Maccabi Haifa (2020–21 Israeli U19 Noar Premier League)
24	Kazakhstan		Kairat (2020 Kazakhstani U17 League)
25	Belarus		Minsk (2020 Belarusian U18 League)
26	Azerbaijan		Gabala (2020–21 Azerbaijani U19 League)
27	Bulgaria		Septemvri Sofia (2020–21 U18 BFU Cup)
28	Romania		Csíkszereda (2020–21 Liga Elitelor U19)
29	Poland		Pogoń Szczecin (2020–21 Polish U18 Central Junior League)
30	Slovakia		Žilina (2020–21 Slovak U19 League)
32	Slovenia		Domžale (2020–21 Slovenian U19 League)
33	Hungary		MTK Budapest (2020–21 Hungarian U19 League)
35	Lithuania		Žalgiris (2020 Lithuanian Elite Youth League U19 Division)
37	Latvia		Daugavpils (2020 Latvian U18 League)
38	Albania		Akademia e Futbollit (2020–21 Albanian U19 League)
39	North Macedonia		Shkëndija (2020–21 Macedonian U19 League)
40	Bosnia and Herzegovina		Zvijezda 09 (2020–21 Bosnia and Herzegovina U19 Junior League)
41	Moldova	Sheriff Tiraspol (2020–21 Divizia Națională U19)	
42	Republic of Ireland		St Patrick's Athletic (2020 League of Ireland U19 Division)

Associations without any participating teams (no teams qualify for UEFA Champions League group stage, and either with no youth domestic competition or not ranked high enough for a vacancy)

Rank	Association
31	Liechtenstein
34	Luxembourg
36	Armenia
43	Finland
44	Georgia
45	Malta

Rank	Association
46	Iceland
47	Wales
48	Northern Ireland
49	Gibraltar
50	Montenegro

Rank	Association
51	Estonia
52	Kosovo
53	Faroe Islands
54	Andorra
55	San Marino

Notes

1. ^{TH} Title holders.
2. ^{YC} Teams playing in the UEFA Champions League Path which were also youth domestic champions.
3. ^{PO} Teams playing in the UEFA Champions League Path after their senior team qualified for the Champions League group stage via play-offs.
4. ^{V-LIE} Team playing in the Domestic Champions Path through the vacancy of Liechtenstein (no youth domestic competition).
5. ^{V-YC} Teams playing in the Domestic Champions Path through the vacancies of teams which qualified for the Champions League group stage automatically.
6. ^{V-PO} Teams playing in the Domestic Champions Path through the vacancies of teams which qualified for the Champions League group stage via play-offs.
7. Belgium (BEL): The 2020–21 Belgian U18 League was abandoned and 2020–21 Belgium Youth Cup was cancelled due to the COVID-19 pandemic in Belgium. Genk, which were originally selected to play in the 2020–21 UEFA Youth League (which was later cancelled) by the Royal Belgian Football Association in the Domestic Champions Path, were selected to play in the 2021–22 UEFA Youth League in the Domestic Champions Path.
8. France (FRA): The 2020–21 Championnat National U19 was abandoned due to the COVID-19 pandemic in France. Angers, which were originally selected to play in the 2020–21 UEFA Youth League (which was later cancelled) by the French Football Federation in the Domestic Champions Path, were selected to play in the 2021–22 UEFA Youth League in the Domestic Champions Path.
9. Germany (GER): The 2020–21 U19 A-Junioren-Bundesliga was abandoned due to the COVID-19 pandemic in Germany. 1. FC Köln, which were originally selected to play in the 2020–21 UEFA Youth League (which was later cancelled) by the German Football Association in the Domestic Champions Path, were selected to play in the 2021–22 UEFA Youth League in the Domestic Champions Path.
10. Netherlands (NED): The 2020–21 Eredivisie U19 was abandoned and the 2020–21 KNVB Youth Cup was not completed by the UEFA registration deadline due to the COVID-19 pandemic in the Netherlands. AZ, which were originally selected to play in the 2020–21 UEFA Youth League (which was later cancelled) by the Royal Dutch Football Association in the Domestic Champions Path, were selected to play in the 2021–22 UEFA Youth League in the Domestic Champions Path.
11. Portugal (POR): The 2020–21 Campeonato Nacional Juniores S19 was abandoned due to the COVID-19 pandemic in Portugal. Benfica, which were originally selected to play in the 2020–21 UEFA Youth League (which was later cancelled) by the Portuguese Football Federation in the Domestic Champions Path, would have been selected to play in the 2021–22 UEFA Youth League in the Domestic Champions Path, but since their senior team qualified for the Champions League group stage via play-offs, they qualified for the UEFA Champions League Path, so no team was selected to play in the 2021–22 UEFA Youth League in the Domestic Champions Path.

== Round and draw dates ==
The schedule of the competition was as follows (all draws were held at the UEFA headquarters in Nyon, Switzerland, unless stated otherwise).

- For the UEFA Champions League Path group stage, in principle the teams played their matches on Tuesdays and Wednesdays of the matchdays as scheduled for UEFA Champions League, and on the same day as the corresponding senior teams; however, matches could also be played on other dates, including Mondays and Thursdays.
- For the Domestic Champions Path first and second rounds, in principle matches were played on Wednesdays (first round on matchdays 2 and 3, second round on matchdays 4 and 5, as scheduled for UEFA Champions League); however, matches could also be played on other dates, including Mondays, Tuesdays and Thursdays.

Schedule for 2021–22 UEFA Youth League
Phase	Round	Draw date	First leg	Second leg
UEFA Champions League Path; Group stage	Matchday 1	26 August 2021 (Istanbul)	14–15 September 2021	
UEFA Champions League Path; Group stage	Matchday 2	26 August 2021 (Istanbul)	28–29 September 2021	
UEFA Champions League Path; Group stage	Matchday 3	26 August 2021 (Istanbul)	19–20 October 2021	
UEFA Champions League Path; Group stage	Matchday 4	26 August 2021 (Istanbul)	2–3 November 2021	
UEFA Champions League Path; Group stage	Matchday 5	26 August 2021 (Istanbul)	23–24 November 2021	
UEFA Champions League Path; Group stage	Matchday 6	26 August 2021 (Istanbul)	7–8 December 2021	
Domestic Champions Path	First round	31 August 2021	29 September 2021	20 October 2021
Domestic Champions Path	Second round	31 August 2021	3 November 2021	24 November 2021
Knockout phase	Knockout round play-offs	14 December 2021	8–9 February 2022	
Knockout phase	Round of 16	14 February 2022	1–2 March 2022	
Knockout phase	Quarter-finals	14 February 2022	15–16 March 2022	
Knockout phase	Semi-finals	14 February 2022	22 April 2022 at Colovray Stadium, Nyon	
Knockout phase	Final	14 February 2022	25 April 2022 at Colovray Stadium, Nyon	

== UEFA Champions League Path ==
For the UEFA Champions League Path, the 32 teams were drawn into eight groups of four. There was no separate draw held, with the group compositions identical to the draw for the 2021–22 UEFA Champions League group stage, which was held on 26 August 2021, 18:00 CEST (19:00 TRT), in Istanbul, Turkey.

In each group, teams played against each other home-and-away in a round-robin format. The group winners advance to the round of 16, while the eight runners-up advance to the play-offs, where they will join by the eight second round winners from the Domestic Champions Path.

=== Group A ===
Pos	Team	Pld	W	D	L	GF	GA	GD	Pts	Qualification	PAR	BRU	MCI	RBL
1	(France) Paris Saint-Germain	6	4	2	0	16	7	+9	14	Round of 16	—	3–2	1–1	3–0
2	(Belgium) Club Brugge	6	3	2	1	18	11	+7	11	Play-offs	2–2	—	1–1	4–1
3	(England) Manchester City	6	2	2	2	12	11	+1	8		1–3	3–5	—	5–1
4	(Germany) RB Leipzig	6	0	0	6	4	21	−17	0		1–4	1–4	0–1	—

Source: UEFA

=== Group B ===
Pos	Team	Pld	W	D	L	GF	GA	GD	Pts	Qualification	LIV	ATM	POR	MIL
1	(England) Liverpool	6	3	2	1	9	4	+5	11	Round of 16	—	2–0	4–0	1–0
2	(Spain) Atlético Madrid	6	3	1	2	9	6	+3	10 (Note: Head-to-head: Atlético Madrid 3 pts (0 GD, 3 GF), Porto 3 pts (0 GD, 3 GF). Goal difference in all group matches: Atlético Madrid +3, Porto –1.)	Play-offs	2–0	—	1–2	3–0
3	(Portugal) Porto	6	3	1	2	8	9	−1	10		1–1	1–2	—	3–1
4	(Italy) Milan	6	0	2	4	3	10	−7	2		1–1	1–1	0–1	—

Source: UEFA

=== Group C ===
Pos	Team	Pld	W	D	L	GF	GA	GD	Pts	Qualification	SPO	DOR	AJX	BES
1	(Portugal) Sporting CP	6	3	2	1	11	8	+3	11	Round of 16	—	3–2	1–1	1–2
2	(Germany) Borussia Dortmund	6	3	1	2	16	9	+7	10 (Note: Head-to-head points: Borussia Dortmund 3, Ajax 3. Head-to-head goal difference: Borussia Dortmund +3, Ajax –3.)	Play-offs	0–0	—	0–1	6–2
3	(Netherlands) Ajax	6	3	1	2	9	10	−1	10		2–3	1–5	—	3–1
4	(Turkey) Beşiktaş	6	1	0	5	8	17	−9	3		1–3	2–3	0–1	—

Source: UEFA

=== Group D ===
Pos	Team	Pld	W	D	L	GF	GA	GD	Pts	Qualification	RMA	INT	SHK	SHE
1	(Spain) Real Madrid	6	4	1	1	11	6	+5	13 (Note: Head-to-head points: Real Madrid 4, Inter Milan 1.)	Round of 16	—	2–1	1–0	4–1
2	(Italy) Inter Milan	6	4	1	1	10	6	+4	13	Play-offs	1–1	—	1–0	2–1
3	(Ukraine) Shakhtar Donetsk	6	3	0	3	14	5	+9	9		3–2	0–1	—	6–0
4	(Moldova) Sheriff Tiraspol	6	0	0	6	4	22	−18	0		0–1	2–4	0–5	—

Source: UEFA

=== Group E ===
Pos	Team	Pld	W	D	L	GF	GA	GD	Pts	Qualification	BEN	DKV	BAR	BAY
1	(Portugal) Benfica	6	5	0	1	14	4	+10	15	Round of 16	—	1–0	4–0	4–0
2	(Ukraine) Dynamo Kyiv	6	4	1	1	14	3	+11	13	Play-offs	4–0	—	4–1	2–1
3	(Spain) Barcelona	6	1	1	4	4	14	−10	4		0–3	0–0	—	2–0
4	(Germany) Bayern Munich	6	1	0	5	4	15	−11	3		0–2	0–4	3–2	—

Source: UEFA

=== Group F ===
Pos	Team	Pld	W	D	L	GF	GA	GD	Pts	Qualification	MUN	VIL	ATA	YB
1	(England) Manchester United	6	5	0	1	12	9	+3	15	Round of 16	—	1–4	4–2	2–1
2	(Spain) Villarreal	6	3	2	1	15	9	+6	11	Play-offs	1–2	—	2–0	3–3
3	(Italy) Atalanta	6	2	1	3	11	12	−1	7		1–2	2–2	—	3–0
4	(Switzerland) Young Boys	6	0	1	5	7	15	−8	1		0–1	1–3	2–3	—

Source: UEFA

=== Group G ===
Pos	Team	Pld	W	D	L	GF	GA	GD	Pts	Qualification	SAL	SEV	LIL	WOL
1	(Austria) Red Bull Salzburg	6	4	0	2	10	5	+5	12	Round of 16	—	2–0	3–1	3–0
2	(Spain) Sevilla	6	3	2	1	8	3	+5	11	Play-offs	2–0	—	0–0	2–0
3	(France) Lille	6	3	1	2	7	6	+1	10		1–0	0–3	—	2–0
4	(Germany) VfL Wolfsburg	6	0	1	5	2	13	−11	1		1–2	1–1	0–3	—

Source: UEFA

=== Group H ===
Pos	Team	Pld	W	D	L	GF	GA	GD	Pts	Qualification	JUV	CHE	ZEN	MAL
1	(Italy) Juventus	6	5	1	0	18	7	+11	16	Round of 16	—	3–1	4–2	4–1
2	(England) Chelsea	6	3	1	2	15	10	+5	10	Play-offs	1–3	—	3–1	4–2
3	(Russia) Zenit Saint Petersburg	6	2	1	3	10	13	−3	7		0–2	1–1	—	3–2
4	(Sweden) Malmö FF	6	0	1	5	8	21	−13	1		2–2	0–5	1–3	—

Source: UEFA

== Domestic Champions Path ==
For the Domestic Champions Path, the 32 teams were drawn into two rounds of two-legged home-and-away ties. The draw for both the first round and second round was held on 31 August 2021.

The eight second round winners advance to the play-offs, where they will join by the eight group runners-up from the UEFA Champions League Path (group stage).

=== First round ===
Team 1	Agg.	Team 2	1st leg	2nd leg
Pogoń Szczecin (Poland)	3–4	(Spain) Deportivo La Coruña	3–0	0–4
MTK Budapest (Hungary)	6–4	(Czech Republic) Sparta Prague	3–1	3–3
PAOK (Greece)	1–7	(Slovakia) Žilina	1–5	0–2
Shkëndija (North Macedonia)	1–5	(Croatia) Hajduk Split	0–2	1–3
Daugavpils (Latvia)	0–6	(Belarus) Minsk	0–4	0–2
APOEL (Cyprus)	1–2	(Kazakhstan) Kairat	1–1	0–1
Žalgiris (Lithuania)	0–5	(Israel) Maccabi Haifa	0–3	0–2
1. FC Köln (Germany)	3–7	(Belgium) Genk	2–4	1–3
Septemvri Sofia (Bulgaria)	4–1	(Albania) Akademia e Futbollit	3–0	1–1
Zvijezda 09 (Bosnia and Herzegovina)	0–3	(Turkey) Trabzonspor	0–1	0–2
Domžale (Slovenia)	2–3	(Italy) Empoli	1–2	1–1
Gabala (Azerbaijan)	0–11	(Netherlands) AZ	0–4	0–7
Csíkszereda (Romania)	0–5	(France) Angers	0–2	0–3
Rangers (Scotland)	5–1	(Sweden) Hammarby IF	3–0	2–1
Rosenborg (Norway)	3–14	(Denmark) Midtjylland	2–4	1–10
St Patrick's Athletic (Republic of Ireland)	1–4	(Serbia) Red Star Belgrade	1–2	0–2

=== Second round ===
Team 1	Agg.	Team 2	1st leg	2nd leg
Hajduk Split (Croatia)	4–1	(Belarus) Minsk	3–0	1–1
MTK Budapest (Hungary)	1–3	(Belgium) Genk	1–2	0–1
Deportivo La Coruña (Spain)	5–4	(Israel) Maccabi Haifa	5–1	0–3
Žilina (Slovakia)	3–3 (3–0 p)	(Kazakhstan) Kairat	3–2	0–1
Red Star Belgrade (Serbia)	1–6	(Italy) Empoli	1–1	0–5
Trabzonspor (Turkey)	2–10	(Denmark) Midtjylland	2–5	0–5
Angers (France)	1–1 (4–5 p)	(Netherlands) AZ	0–1	1–0
Septemvri Sofia (Bulgaria)	2–7 (Note: Order of legs reversed after original draw.)	(Scotland) Rangers	2–4	0–3

== Knockout phase ==
The mechanism of the draws for each round was as follows:

- In the draw for the knockout round play-offs, the eight second round winners from the Domestic Champions Path were drawn against the eight group runners-up from the UEFA Champions League Path, with the teams from the Domestic Champions Path hosting the match. Teams from the same association could not be drawn against each other.
- In the draw for the round of 16, there were no seedings, and the sixteen teams (eight UEFA Champions League Path group winners and eight play-off winners) were drawn into eight ties. Teams from the same UEFA Champions League Path group could not be drawn against each other, but teams from the same association could be drawn against each other. The draw also decided the home team for each round of 16 match.
- In the draws for the quarter-finals onwards, there were no seedings, and teams from the same UEFA Champions League Path group or the same association could be drawn against each other (the identity of the quarter-final winners and onwards was not known at the time of the draws). The draws also decided the home team for each quarter-final, and which quarter-final and semi-final winners were designated as the "home" team for each semi-final and final (for administrative purposes as they were played at a neutral venue).

=== Bracket ===
Knockout round play-offs
(Italy) Empoli	3
(Germany) Borussia Dortmund	5
(Croatia) Hajduk Split	0 (2)
(Spain) Atlético Madrid (p)	0 (3)
(Scotland) Rangers	0
(Spain) Sevilla	1
(Slovakia) Žilina	3
(Italy) Inter Milan	1
(Netherlands) AZ (p)	3 (4)
(Spain) Villarreal	3 (3)
(Belgium) Genk	5
(England) Chelsea	1
(Spain) Deportivo La Coruña	2 (2)
(Ukraine) Dynamo Kyiv (p)	2 (3)
(Denmark) Midtjylland	3
(Belgium) Club Brugge	2

Round of 16
(England) Manchester United	2 (1)
(Germany) Borussia Dortmund (p)	2 (3)
(Spain) Real Madrid	2
(Spain) Atlético Madrid	3
(France) Paris Saint-Germain	2
(Spain) Sevilla	0
(Slovakia) Žilina	1 (3)
(Austria) Red Bull Salzburg (p)	1 (4)
(Netherlands) AZ	0 (4)
(Italy) Juventus (p)	0 (5)
(England) Liverpool (p)	1 (4)
(Belgium) Genk	1 (3)
(Ukraine) Dynamo Kyiv	1
(Portugal) Sporting CP	2
(Denmark) Midtjylland	2
(Portugal) Benfica	3

Quarter-finals
(Germany) Borussia Dortmund	0
(Spain) Atlético Madrid	1
(France) Paris Saint-Germain	1
(Austria) Red Bull Salzburg	3
(Italy) Juventus	2
(England) Liverpool	0
(Portugal) Sporting CP	0
(Portugal) Benfica	4

Semi-finals
22 April – Nyon
(Spain) Atlético Madrid	0
(Austria) Red Bull Salzburg	5
22 April – Nyon
(Italy) Juventus	2 (3)
(Portugal) Benfica (p)	2 (4)

Final
25 April – Nyon
(Austria) Red Bull Salzburg	0
(Portugal) Benfica	6

=== Knockout round play-offs ===
The draw was conducted on 14 December 2021 12:00 CET at the UEFA headquarters in Nyon. The knockout round play-offs were played over one leg on 8 and 9 February 2022.

Home team	Score	Away team
Empoli (Italy)	3–5	(Germany) Borussia Dortmund
Genk (Belgium)	5–1	(England) Chelsea
AZ (Netherlands)	3–3 (4–3 p)	(Spain) Villarreal
Žilina (Slovakia)	3–1	(Italy) Inter Milan
Hajduk Split (Croatia)	0–0 (2–3 p)	(Spain) Atlético Madrid
Midtjylland (Denmark)	3–2	(Belgium) Club Brugge
Deportivo La Coruña (Spain)	2–2 (2–3 p)	(Ukraine) Dynamo Kyiv
Rangers (Scotland)	0–1	(Spain) Sevilla

=== Round of 16 ===
The draw was conducted on 14 February 2022 12:00 CET at the UEFA headquarters in Nyon. The round of 16 was played over one leg on 1 March, 2 March and 7 April 2022.

Home team	Score	Away team
Liverpool (England)	1–1 (4–3 p)	(Belgium) Genk
Real Madrid (Spain)	2–3	(Spain) Atlético Madrid
AZ (Netherlands)	0–0 (4–5 p)	(Italy) Juventus
Dynamo Kyiv (Ukraine)	1–2	(Portugal) Sporting CP
Manchester United (England)	2–2 (1–3 p)	(Germany) Borussia Dortmund
Žilina (Slovakia)	1–1 (3–4 p)	(Austria) Red Bull Salzburg
Paris Saint-Germain (France)	2–0	(Spain) Sevilla
Midtjylland (Denmark)	2–3	(Portugal) Benfica

=== Quarter-finals ===
The draw was conducted on 14 February 2022 12:00 CET at the UEFA headquarters in Nyon. The quarter-finals were played over one leg from 15 March to 13 April 2022.

Home team	Score	Away team
Juventus (Italy)	2–0	(England) Liverpool
Paris Saint-Germain (France)	1–3	(Austria) Red Bull Salzburg
Sporting CP (Portugal)	0–4	(Portugal) Benfica
Borussia Dortmund (Germany)	0–1	(Spain) Atlético Madrid

=== Semi-finals ===
The draw was conducted on 14 February 2022 12:00 CET at the UEFA headquarters in Nyon. The semi-finals were played over one leg on 22 April 2022 at Colovray Stadium, Nyon.

Team 1	Score	Team 2
Juventus (Italy)	2–2 (3–4 p)	(Portugal) Benfica
Atlético Madrid (Spain)	0–5	(Austria) Red Bull Salzburg

=== Final ===
The draw was conducted on 14 February 2022 12:00 CET at the UEFA headquarters in Nyon. The final was played on 25 April 2022 at Colovray Stadium, Nyon.

This was a replay of the 2017 UEFA Youth League Final, which Salzburg won 2–1. Benfica won 6–0 to win their first Youth League title, and their first title in European football since the 1961–62 European Cup.

25 April 2022
18:00 UTC+2

Red Bull Salzburg (Austria)	0–6	(Portugal) Benfica
	Report	Neto 2'; H. Araújo 15', 57', 89' (pen.); Ndour 53'; Semedo 69'

Colovray Stadium, Nyon
Attendance: 4,000
Referee: Harm Osmers (Germany)

== Top goalscorers ==
Rank	Player	Team	Goals
1	(Denmark) Mads Hansen	(Denmark) Midtjylland	7
1	(Denmark) Aral Şimşir	(Denmark) Midtjylland	7
1	(Croatia) Roko Šimić	(Austria) FC Salzburg	7
4	(England) Jamie Bynoe-Gittens	(Germany) Borussia Dortmund	6
4	(Bosnia and Herzegovina) Filip Čuić	(Croatia) Hajduk Split	6
6	(Senegal) Samba Diallo	(Ukraine) Dynamo Kyiv	5
6	(Switzerland) Bradley Fink	(Germany) Borussia Dortmund	5
6	(Denmark) Oscar Fraulo	(Denmark) Midtjylland	5
6	(Mauritania) Djeidi Gassama	(France) Paris Saint-Germain	5
6	(Slovakia) Timotej Jambor	(Slovakia) Žilina	5
6	(England) James McAtee	(England) Manchester City	5
6	(Belgium) Cisse Sandra	(Belgium) Club Brugge	5
6	(Portugal) Luís Semedo	(Portugal) Benfica	5
6	(Hungary) Zalán Vancsa	(Hungary) MTK Budapest	5
