= Álex Jiménez (footballer, born 2003) =

Spanish footballer

Personal information
- Full name: Alejandro Jiménez Hernández
- Date of birth: 21 September 2003 (age 23)
- Place of birth: Águilas, Spain
- Height: 1.82 m (6 ft 0 in)
- Position: Forward

Team information
- Current team: Hércules

Youth career
- 2015–2016: Roda
- 2016–2019: Villarreal
- 2019–2020: Roda
- 2020–2021: Villarreal

Senior career*
| Years | Team | Apps | (Gls) |
| 2020–2024 | Villarreal C | 59 | (17) |
| 2023 | → Sestao (loan) | 9 | (0) |
| 2024–2026 | Gimnàstic | 67 | (6) |
| 2026– | Hércules | 0 | (0) |

International career
| 2019 | Spain U16 | 5 | (2) |
| 2019–2020 | Spain U17 | 8 | (2) |
| 2019 | Spain U18 | 2 | (0) |
| 2021–2022 | Spain U19 | 5 | (1) |
- * Club domestic league appearances and goals as of 10 June 2026

Alejandro "Álex" "Jiménez Hernández (born 21 September 2003) is a Spanish footballer who plays as a forward for Hércules CF.

== Club career ==
Born in Águilas, Region of Murcia, Jiménez joined Villarreal CF's youth sides in 2015, being initially assigned to affiliate side CD Roda. In September 2020, aged 16, he featured with the C-team in a friendly against Hércules CF, but was only promoted to the side in the following year.

On 11 January 2022, Jiménez renewed his contract with the Yellow Submarine until 2025. On 28 August 2023, he was loaned to Primera Federación side Sestao River Club for the season.

In December 2023, after being rarely used, Jiménez's loan with Sestao was cut short, and he returned to Villarreal C. The following 30 August, after being deemed surplus to requirements, he signed a two-year deal with Gimnàstic de Tarragona in the third division.

On 13 June 2026, Jiménez joined Hércules CF also in division three.

== International career ==
Jiménez represented Spain at under-16, under-17, under-18 and under-19 levels.
