= 2022–23 F.C. Penafiel season =

F.C. Penafiel
2022–23 season
- President: António Gaspar Dias
- Head coach: Filó (until 31 January); Hélder Cristóvão (from 31 January)
- Stadium: Estádio Municipal 25 de Abril
- Liga Portugal 2: 10th
- Taça de Portugal: Third round
- Taça da Liga: Group stage
Home colours	Away colours	Third colours

The 2022–23 season is the 72nd season in the history of F.C. Penafiel and their eighth consecutive season in the second division of Portuguese football. The club are participating in the Liga Portugal 2, the Taça de Portugal, and the Taça da Liga. The season covers the period from 1 July 2022 to 30 June 2023.

== Players ==
As of 7 August 2022

Note: Flags indicate national team as defined under FIFA eligibility rules; some limited exceptions apply. Players may hold more than one non-FIFA nationality.

No.	Pos.	Nation	Player
1	GK	POR	Nuno Macedo
3	DF	BRA	Lucas Tagliapietra
4	DF	POR	Silvério
5	DF	POR	Bruno Pereira
6	DF	POR	Leandro Teixeira
7	FW	POR	Edi Semedo
8	MF	POR	Reko Silva
9	FW	DEN	Marcus Mølvadgaard
10	MF	BRA	Bruno César
11	FW	POR	Adriano Castanheira
14	DF	POR	João Miguel
15	DF	POR	Simãozinho
17	FW	POR	Roberto

No.	Pos.	Nation	Player
20	MF	POR	João Oliveira
21	MF	POR	Diogo Batista
22	GK	BRA	Caio Secco
24	DF	POR	Gonçalo Loureiro
25	MF	POR	Rúben Freitas
28	DF	POR	Afonso Figueiredo
30	FW	POR	Feliz Vaz
35	MF	POR	Filipe Cardoso
73	GK	POR	Filipe Ferreira
75	FW	POR	Robinho
77	MF	POR	Mica Silva
88	FW	BRA	Adílio
91	FW	POR	Fábio Fortes

== Pre-season and friendlies ==
Win Draw Loss Fixtures

13 July 2022 Friendly	Gil Vicente (Portugal)	2–0	(Portugal) Penafiel	Arcos de Valdevez
17:00 WEST (UTC+1)				Stadium: Estádio Municipal da Coutada

16 July 2022 Friendly	Penafiel (Portugal)	0–0	(Portugal) Santa Clara	Penafiel
10:00 WEST (UTC+1)				Stadium: Estádio Municipal 25 de Abril

20 July 2022 Friendly	Penafiel (Portugal)	1–1	(Portugal) Marítimo	TBD
--:-- WEST (UTC+1)

30 July 2022 Friendly	Penafiel (Portugal)	2–0	(Portugal) Vizela	Penafiel
10:00 WEST (UTC+1)	Loureiro; Roberto			Stadium: Estádio Municipal 25 de Abril

== Competitions ==
=== Overall record ===
Competition	First match	Last match	Starting round	Final position	Record							
Competition	First match	Last match	Starting round	Final position	Pld	W	D	L	GF	GA	GD	Win %
Liga Portugal 2	8 August 2022	May 2023	Matchday 1		19	6	7	6	18	20	−2	31.58
Taça de Portugal	2 October 2022	15 October 2022	Second round	Third round	2	1	1	0	6	5	+1	50.00
Taça da Liga	17 November 2022	17 December 2022	Group stage	Group stage	3	0	1	2	2	5	−3	0.00
Total					24	7	9	8	26	30	−4	29.17

Last updated: 5 February 2023
Source: Soccerway

=== Liga Portugal 2 ===
==== League table ====
Pos	Team	Pld	W	D	L	GF	GA	GD	Pts
10	Oliveirense	34	11	10	13	51	50	+1	43
11	Tondela	34	8	16	10	35	35	0	40
12	Penafiel	34	9	12	13	36	47	−11	39 (Note: Penafiel are ahead of Nacional on head-to-head points: Penafiel 3–0 Nacional, Nacional 1–1 Pennafiel.)
13	Nacional	34	10	9	15	35	46	−11	39
14	Benfica B (I)	34	10	8	16	52	58	−6	38 (Note: Benfica B are ahead of Leixões on head-to-head points: Benfica B 2–1 Leixões, Leixões 1–1 Benfica B. Leixões were deducted 1 point for financial irregularities.)

Updated to match(es) played on 28 May 2023. Source: Liga Portugal 2
Rules for classification: 1) Points; 2) Head-to-head points; 3) Head-to-head goal difference; 4) Head-to-head away goals scored; 5) Goal difference; 6) Matches won; 7) Goals scored; 8) Play-off.
(I) Ineligible for promotion

==== Results summary ====
Overall								Home						Away					
Pld	W	D	L	GF	GA	GD	Pts	W	D	L	GF	GA	GD	W	D	L	GF	GA	GD
0	0	0	0	0	0	0	0	0	0	0	0	0	0	0	0	0	0	0	0

Last updated: August 2022.
Source: Liga Portugal

==== Results by round ====
Round	1
Ground	
Result	
Position	

Updated to match(es) played on August 2022. Source: Liga Portugal
A = Away; H = Home; W = Win; D = Draw; L = Loss

==== Matches ====
The league fixtures were announced on 5 July 2022.
