= 2021–22 UEFA Youth League Domestic Champions Path =

European club football tournament

The 2021–22 UEFA Youth League Domestic Champions Path began on 28 September and ended on 8 December 2021. A total of 32 teams competed in the Domestic Champions Path to decide eight of the 24 places in the knockout phase (play-offs and the round of 16 onwards) of the 2021–22 UEFA Youth League.

Times listed here by CEST/CET. (Note: Times up to 31 October 2021 (first round) are CEST (UTC+2), thereafter (second round) times are CET (UTC+1).)

== Draw ==
The youth domestic champions of the top 32 associations according to their 2021 UEFA country coefficients entered the Domestic Champions Path. Should there was a vacancy (associations with no youth domestic competition, as well as youth domestic champions already included in the UEFA Champions League path), it was first filled by the title holders should they have not yet qualified, and then by the youth domestic champions of the next association in the UEFA ranking.

Akademia e Futbollit, Angers, Deportivo La Coruña, Daugavpils, Empoli, Hajduk Split, 1. FC Köln, Csíkszereda, Pogoń Szczecin, St Patrick's Athletic, Trabzonspor, Žalgiris and Zvijezda 09 will make their tournament debuts. Lithuania will be represented for the first time.

For the Domestic Champions Path, the 32 teams were drawn into two rounds of two-legged home-and-away ties. The draw for both the first round and second round was held on 31 August 2021, at the UEFA headquarters in Nyon, Switzerland. There were no seedings, but the 32 teams were split into groups defined by sporting and geographical criteria prior to the draw.

- In the first round, the 32 teams were split into four groups. Teams in the same group were drawn against each other, with the order of legs decided by draw.
- In the second round, the sixteen winners of the first round, whose identity was not known at the time of the draw, were split into two groups: Group A contained the winners from Groups 1 and 2, while Group B contained the winners from Groups 3 and 4. Teams in the same group were drawn against each other, with the order of legs decided by draw.

Key to colours
Second round winners advance to the play-offs

Group 1 Team (Spain) Deportivo La Coruña (Czech Republic) Sparta Prague (Greece) PAOK (Croatia) Hajduk Split (Poland) Pogoń Szczecin (Slovakia) Žilina (Hungary) MTK Budapest (North Macedonia) Shkëndija	Group 2 Team (Germany) 1. FC Köln (Belgium) Genk (Cyprus) APOEL (Israel) Maccabi Haifa (Kazakhstan) Kairat (Belarus) Minsk (Lithuania) Žalgiris (Latvia) Daugavpils	Group 3 Team (Italy) Empoli (Netherlands) AZ (Turkey) Trabzonspor (Azerbaijan) Gabala (Bulgaria) Septemvri Sofia (Slovenia) Domžale (Albania) Akademia e Futbollit (Bosnia and Herzegovina) Zvijezda 09	Group 4 Team (France) Angers (Denmark) Midtjylland (Scotland) Rangers (Serbia) Red Star Belgrade (Sweden) Hammarby IF (Norway) Rosenborg (Romania) Csíkszereda (Republic of Ireland) St Patrick's Athletic

== Format ==
In the Domestic Champions Path, each tie is played over two legs, with each team playing one leg at home. The team that scores more goals on aggregate over the two legs advances to the next round. If the aggregate score is level, as the away goals rule has been scrapped early this season, the match will be decided by a penalty shoot-out with no extra time played.

The eight second round winners advance to the play-offs, where they are joined by the eight group runners-up from the UEFA Champions League Path.

== First round ==
=== Summary ===
Team 1	Agg.	Team 2	1st leg	2nd leg
Pogoń Szczecin (Poland)	3–4	(Spain) Deportivo La Coruña	3–0	0–4
MTK Budapest (Hungary)	6–4	(Czech Republic) Sparta Prague	3–1	3–3
PAOK (Greece)	1–7	(Slovakia) Žilina	1–5	0–2
Shkëndija (North Macedonia)	1–5	(Croatia) Hajduk Split	0–2	1–3
Daugavpils (Latvia)	0–6	(Belarus) Minsk	0–4	0–2
APOEL (Cyprus)	1–2	(Kazakhstan) Kairat	1–1	0–1
Žalgiris (Lithuania)	0–5	(Israel) Maccabi Haifa	0–3	0–2
1. FC Köln (Germany)	3–7	(Belgium) Genk	2–4	1–3
Septemvri Sofia (Bulgaria)	4–1	(Albania) Akademia e Futbollit	3–0	1–1
Zvijezda 09 (Bosnia and Herzegovina)	0–3	(Turkey) Trabzonspor	0–1	0–2
Domžale (Slovenia)	2–3	(Italy) Empoli	1–2	1–1
Gabala (Azerbaijan)	0–11	(Netherlands) AZ	0–4	0–7
Csíkszereda (Romania)	0–5	(France) Angers	0–2	0–3
Rangers (Scotland)	5–1	(Sweden) Hammarby IF	3–0	2–1
Rosenborg (Norway)	3–14	(Denmark) Midtjylland	2–4	1–10
St Patrick's Athletic (Republic of Ireland)	1–4	(Serbia) Red Star Belgrade	1–2	0–2

=== Matches ===
29 September 2021
18:00

Pogoń Szczecin (Poland)	3–0	(Spain) Deportivo La Coruña
Fornalczyk 39'; Bąk 45+3'; Grzelka 90+2'	Report

Stadion Miejski, Szczecin
Attendance: 3,015
Referee: Christopher Jaeger (Austria)
20 October 2021
20:00

Deportivo La Coruña (Spain)	4–0	(Poland) Pogoń Szczecin
Białczyk 11' (o.g.); Guerra 28'; Nájera 36'; Baldomar 90+1'	Report

Estadio Riazor, A Coruña
Attendance: 8,522
Referee: Bram Van Driessche (Belgium)

Deportivo La Coruña won 4–3 on aggregate.

29 September 2021
18:00

MTK Budapest (Hungary)	3–1	(Czech Republic) Sparta Prague
Vasvári 5'; Vancsa 25', 46'	Report	Šilhart 20'

Hidegkuti Nándor Stadium, Budapest
Attendance: 535
Referee: Nicolas Laforge (Belgium)
20 October 2021
14:00

Sparta Prague (Czech Republic)	3–3	(Hungary) MTK Budapest
Sejk 25' (pen.); Kaštánek 50'; Vydra 80'	Report	Vancsa 45', 76'; Georgievski 89'

FK Viktoria Stadion, Prague
Attendance: 385
Referee: Luka Bilbija (Bosnia and Herzegovina)

MTK Budapest won 6–4 on aggregate.

29 September 2021
18:00 (19:00 UTC+3)

PAOK (Greece)	1–5	(Slovakia) Žilina
Varela 6'	Report	Kaprálik 27', 90+1'; Sauer 45'; Jambor 50', 63'

Kaftanzoglio Stadium, Thessaloniki
Attendance: 260
Referee: Fedayi San (Switzerland)
20 October 2021
16:30

Žilina (Slovakia)	2–0	(Greece) PAOK
Addo 75'; Jambor 78'	Report

Štadión pod Dubňom, Žilina
Attendance: 1,016
Referee: Dzmitry Dzmitryieu (Belarus)

Žilina won 7–1 on aggregate.

30 September 2021
14:00

Shkëndija (North Macedonia)	0–2	(Croatia) Hajduk Split
	Report	Čuić 29', 56'

Petar Miloševski Training Centre, Skopje
Attendance: 100
Referee: Nikola Popov (Bulgaria)
20 October 2021
17:00

Hajduk Split (Croatia)	3–1	(North Macedonia) Shkëndija
Antunović 31'; Čuić 40'; Brkljača 80'	Report	Hamza 29'

Stadion Poljud, Split
Attendance: 500
Referee: Christian-Petru Ciochirca (Austria)

Hajduk Split won 5–1 on aggregate.

29 September 2021
13:00 (14:00 UTC+3)

Daugavpils (Latvia)	0–4	(Belarus) Minsk
	Report	Dushevskiy 27', 58'; Kasarab 34'; Malashevich 68'

Slokas Stadium, Jūrmala
Attendance: 29
Referee: Ondrej Pechanec (Czech Republic)
20 October 2021
13:00 (14:00 UTC+3)

Minsk (Belarus)	2–0	(Latvia) Daugavpils
Šaraņins 21' (o.g.); Ivashyn 89'	Report

FC Minsk Stadium, Minsk
Attendance: 87
Referee: Henrik Nalbandyan (Armenia)

Minsk won 6–0 on aggregate.

29 September 2021
15:00 (16:00 UTC+3)

APOEL (Cyprus)	1–1	(Kazakhstan) Kairat
Satsias 13'	Report	Omatay 5'

AEK Arena, Larnaca
Attendance: 383
Referee: Dejan Jakimovksi (Macedonia)
20 October 2021
13:00 (17:00 UTC+6)

Kairat (Kazakhstan)	1–0	(Cyprus) APOEL
Omatay 4'	Report

Almaty Central Stadium, Almaty
Attendance: 3,525
Referee: Veaceslav Banari (Moldova)

Kairat won 2–1 on aggregate.

28 September 2021
18:00 (19:00 UTC+3)

Žalgiris (Lithuania)	0–3	(Israel) Maccabi Haifa
	Report	Kay Laish 5'; Zaga 62'; Razon 86'

LFF Stadium, Vilnius
Attendance: 832
Referee: Luís Teixeira (Portugal)
20 October 2021
18:00 (19:00 UTC+3)

Maccabi Haifa (Israel)	2–0	(Lithuania) Žalgiris
Colley 38'; Elmichly 87'	Report

Netanya Stadium, Netanya
Attendance: 870
Referee: Emmanouil Skoulas (Greece)

Maccabi Haifa won 5–0 on aggregate.

29 September 2021
18:00

1. FC Köln (Germany)	2–4	(Belgium) Genk
Schmid 5'; Schwirten 47'	Report	Diawara 36'; John 43', 45+2'; Németh 58'

Franz-Kremer-Stadion, Cologne
Attendance: 3,200
Referee: Mario Zebec (Croatia)
19 October 2021
18:00

Genk (Belgium)	3–1	(Germany) 1. FC Köln
Abid 14'; Oyen 60'; Geusens 90+6' (pen.)	Report	Schwirten 8'

Cegeka Arena – Stadium B, Genk
Attendance: 1,350
Referee: Robert Ian Jenkins (Wales)

Genk won 7–3 on aggregate.

29 September 2021
16:00 (17:00 UTC+3)

Septemvri Sofia (Bulgaria)	3–0	(Albania) Akademia e Futbollit
Stoichkov 44'; Avramov 45+1'; Aleksandrov 80'	Report

Stadion Slavia, Sofia
Attendance: 430
Referee: Ferenc Karakó (Hungary)
19 October 2021
19:00

Akademia e Futbollit (Albania)	1–1	(Bulgaria) Septemvri Sofia
Halilaj 45+2'	Report	Stoychev 90+1'

Elbasan Arena, Elbasan
Attendance: 200
Referee: Igor Stojchevski (Macedonia)

Septemvri Sofia won 4–1 on aggregate.

29 September 2021
15:00

Zvijezda 09 (Bosnia and Herzegovina)	0–1	(Turkey) Trabzonspor
	Report	Tuğ 45'

Ugljevik City Stadium, Ugljevik
Attendance: 690
Referee: Jasmin Sabotic (Luxembourg)
20 October 2021
13:00 (14:00 UTC+3)

Trabzonspor (Turkey)	2–0	(Bosnia and Herzegovina) Zvijezda 09
Sağlam 54'; Cebeci 70' (pen.)	Report

Yavuz Selim Stadium, Trabzon
Attendance: 213
Referee: Georgi Davidov (Bulgaria)

Trabzonspor won 3–0 on aggregate.

29 September 2021
19:00

Domžale (Slovenia)	1–2	(Italy) Empoli
Černe 28'	Report	Ekong 8'; Baldanzi 75'

Športni park Domžale, Domžale
Attendance: 800
Referee: Miloš Milanović (Serbia)
20 October 2021
19:00

Empoli (Italy)	1–1	(Slovenia) Domžale
Asllani 45+2' (pen.)	Report	Perc 18'

Stadio Carlo Castellani, Empoli
Attendance: 568
Referee: Gergo Bogár (Hungary)

Empoli won 3–2 on aggregate.

29 September 2021
15:00 (17:00 UTC+4)

Gabala (Azerbaijan)	0–4	(Netherlands) AZ
	Report	Koster 15', 59'; Schouten 54'; Daal 78'

Gabala City Stadium, Qabala
Attendance: 150
Referee: Viktor Kopiievskyi (Ukraine)
19 October 2021
17:00

AZ (Netherlands)	7–0	(Azerbaijan) Gabala
Koster 4', 36'; De Jong 17'; Van Brederode 43'; Van Aken 60'; Kerssens 63'; Meerdink 72'	Report

AZ Training Centre, Wijdewormer
Attendance: 350
Referee: Dario Bel (Croatia)

AZ won 11–0 on aggregate.

29 September 2021
17:00 (18:00 UTC+3)

Csíkszereda (Romania)	0–2	(France) Angers
	Report	Boma 17'; Gergely 90' (o.g.)

Stadionul Municipal, Miercurea Ciuc
Attendance: 755
Referee: Eldorjan Hamiti (Albania)
20 October 2021
18:00

Angers (France)	3–0	(Romania) Csíkszereda
Lgharbi 56'; Nadje 61', 83'	Report

Stade Raymond Kopa, Angers
Attendance: 2,686
Referee: Nikolas Neokleous (Cyprus)

Angers won 5–0 on aggregate.

28 September 2021
20:30 (19:30 UTC+1)

Rangers (Scotland)	3–0	(Sweden) Hammarby IF
Ure 11'; McCausland 65', 81'	Report

Dumbarton Football Stadium, Dumbarton
Attendance: 599
Referee: Aristotelis Diamantopoulos (Greece)
20 October 2021
19:00

Hammarby IF (Sweden)	1–2	(Scotland) Rangers
Axelsson 80'	Report	Ure 66'; McCausland 90+6'

Tele2 Arena, Stockholm
Attendance: 0
Referee: Kristoffer Hagenes (Norway)

Rangers won 5–1 on aggregate.

30 September 2021
18:00

Rosenborg (Norway)	2–4	(Denmark) Midtjylland
Holden 23'; Brostrøm 90'	Report	Fraulo 22'; M. Hansen 46'; Simsir 54'; Texel 65'

Lerkendal Stadion, Trondheim
Attendance: 484
Referee: Thomas Gary Owen (Wales)
19 October 2021
15:30

Midtjylland (Denmark)	10–1	(Norway) Rosenborg
A. Hansen 10'; Fraulo 25', 47', 53'; Simsir 45+1', 71', 80'; M. Hansen 50'; Bagou 75', 89'	Report	Vik 34'

Ikast Stadium, Ikast
Attendance: 521
Referee: Keith Kennedy (Northern Ireland)

Midtjylland won 14–3 on aggregate.

29 September 2021
20:45 (19:45 UTC+1)

St Patrick's Athletic (Republic of Ireland)	1–2	(Serbia) Red Star Belgrade
McCormack 90+2'	Report	Lazetić 3', 45+4'

Richmond Park, Dublin
Attendance: 530
Referee: Ivar Orri Kristjansson (Iceland)
20 October 2021
17:30

Red Star Belgrade (Serbia)	2–0	(Republic of Ireland) St Patrick's Athletic
Leković 12'; Milosavić 80'	Report

Čukarički Stadium, Belgrade
Attendance: 647
Referee: Manfredas Lukjancukas (Lithuania)

Red Star Belgrade won 4–1 on aggregate.

== Second round ==
=== Summary ===
Team 1	Agg.	Team 2	1st leg	2nd leg
Hajduk Split (Croatia)	4–1	(Belarus) Minsk	3–0	1–1
MTK Budapest (Hungary)	1–3	(Belgium) Genk	1–2	0–1
Deportivo La Coruña (Spain)	5–4	(Israel) Maccabi Haifa	5–1	0–3
Žilina (Slovakia)	3–3 (3–0 p)	(Kazakhstan) Kairat	3–2	0–1
Red Star Belgrade (Serbia)	1–6	(Italy) Empoli	1–1	0–5
Trabzonspor (Turkey)	2–10	(Denmark) Midtjylland	2–5	0–5
Angers (France)	1–1 (4–5 p)	(Netherlands) AZ	0–1	1–0
Septemvri Sofia (Bulgaria)	2–7 (Note: Order of legs reversed after original draw.)	(Scotland) Rangers	2–4	0–3

=== Matches ===
3 November 2021
16:00

Hajduk Split (Croatia)	3–0	(Belarus) Minsk
Hrgović 31'; Čuić 44', 60'	Report

Stadion Poljud, Split
Attendance: 500
Referee: Marcel Birsan (Romania)
24 November 2021
11:00 (13:00 UTC+3)

Minsk (Belarus)	1–1	(Croatia) Hajduk Split
Knyazev 45'	Report	Čuić 72'

FC Minsk Stadium, Minsk
Attendance: 150
Referee: Vitālijs Spasjoņņikovs (Latvia)

Hajduk Split won 4–1 on aggregate.

3 November 2021
16:00

MTK Budapest (Hungary)	1–2	(Belgium) Genk
Vancsa 45+1'	Report	Németh 59'; John 64'

Hidegkuti Nándor Stadium, Budapest
Attendance: 851
Referee: Daniyar Sakhi (Kazakhstan)
23 November 2021
18:00

Genk (Belgium)	1–0	(Hungary) MTK Budapest
Geusens 83'	Report

Cegeka Arena, Genk
Attendance: 570
Referee: Ian McNabb (Northern Ireland)

Genk won 3–1 on aggregate.

3 November 2021
20:00

Deportivo La Coruña (Spain)	5–1	(Israel) Maccabi Haifa
Nájera 12'; Hernández 45' (pen.); Teijo 50'; Mella 56'; Baldomar 85'	Report	Elmichly 83'

Estadio Riazor, A Coruña
Attendance: 12,189
Referee: Helgi Mikael Jónasson (Iceland)
8 December 2021
16:00 (17:00 UTC+2)

Maccabi Haifa (Israel)	3–0	(Spain) Deportivo La Coruña
Kay Laish 49'; Elmichly 60'; Razon 82'	Report

Netanya Stadium, Netanya
Attendance: 610
Referee: Loukas Sotiriou (Cyprus)

Deportivo La Coruña won 5–4 on aggregate.

3 November 2021
16:30

Žilina (Slovakia)	3–2	(Kazakhstan) Kairat
Jambor 34', 64'; Šnajder 36'	Report	Aremeyaw 42' (o.g.); Trufanov 79'

Štadión pod Dubňom, Žilina
Attendance: 655
Referee: Dragomir Draganov (Bulgaria)
24 November 2021
11:00 (16:00 UTC+6)

Kairat (Kazakhstan)	1–0	(Slovakia) Žilina
Toleukhanov 32'	Report
Penalties
Kobeyev (penalty missed); Shirobokov (penalty missed); Azatov (penalty missed)	0–3	(penalty scored) Oravec; (penalty scored) Javorček; (penalty scored) Belko

FC Kairat Academy Stadium, Almaty
Attendance: 250
Referee: Viktor Shimusik (Belarus)

3–3 on aggregate; Žilina won 3–0 on penalties.

3 November 2021
16:30

Red Star Belgrade (Serbia)	1–1	(Italy) Empoli
Stojanović 42'	Report	Degli Innocenti 56' (pen.)

Čukarički Stadium, Belgrade
Attendance: 655
Referee: Vassilis Fotias (Greece)
23 November 2021
19:00

Empoli (Italy)	5–0	(Serbia) Red Star Belgrade
Magazzu 14'; Asllani 16', 65' (pen.); Baldanzi 61'; Logrieco 90+3'	Report

Stadio Carlo Castellani, Empoli
Attendance: 697
Referee: Allard Lindhout (Netherlands)

Empoli won 6–1 on aggregate.

2 November 2021
12:00 (14:00 UTC+3)

Trabzonspor (Turkey)	2–5	(Denmark) Midtjylland
Uzun 41', 44'	Report	Fischer 7'; M. Hansen 19' (pen.), 58', 71'; Djuric 23'

Yavuz Selim Stadium, Trabzon
Attendance: 376
Referee: Matthew De Gabriele (Malta)
23 November 2021
14:00

Midtjylland (Denmark)	5–0	(Turkey) Trabzonspor
O. Sørensen 10'; M. Hansen 39' (pen.), 44'; Simsir 49'; H. Sørensen 75'	Report

Ikast Stadium, Ikast
Attendance: 371
Referee: Alex Troleis (Faroe Islands)

Midtjylland won 10–2 on aggregate.

3 November 2021
18:00

Angers (France)	0–1	(Netherlands) AZ
	Report	Schouten 69'

Stade Raymond Kopa, Angers
Attendance: 3,000
Referee: Morten Krogh (Denmark)
23 November 2021
16:00

AZ (Netherlands)	0–1	(France) Angers
	Report	Martins 32'
Penalties
Goes (penalty scored); Dekker (penalty scored); De Jong (penalty scored); Meerdink (penalty scored); Van Brederode (penalty scored)	5–4	(penalty scored) Martins; (penalty missed) Taïbi; (penalty scored) Ndeke; (penalty scored) Camara; (penalty scored) Lgharbi

AZ Training Centre, Wijdewormer
Attendance: 0
Referee: Robertas Valikonis (Lithuania)

1–1 on aggregate; AZ won 5–4 on penalties.

24 November 2021
14:00 (15:00 UTC+2)

Septemvri Sofia (Bulgaria)	2–4	(Scotland) Rangers
Aleksandrov 25'; Stoychev 30'	Report	Weston 21', 51', 71'; McKinnon 44'

Stadion Slavia, Sofia
Attendance: 420
Referee: Nathan Verboomen (Belgium)
7 December 2021
20:30 (19:30 UTC+0)

Rangers (Scotland)	3–0	(Bulgaria) Septemvri Sofia
Lowry 55'; Weston 65'; McKinnon 88'	Report

Dumbarton Football Stadium, Dumbarton
Attendance: 360
Referee: Sandi Putros (Denmark)

Rangers won 7–2 on aggregate.
