= 2021–22 in Croatian football =

Football in Croatia
- Season: 2021–22

Men's football
- Prva HNL: Dinamo Zagreb
- Druga HNL: Varaždin
- Treća HNL: Polet Sveti Martin na Muri (North); Jadran Luka Ploče (South); Crikvenica (West); Vukovar 1991 (East); Zagorec Krapina (Center)
- Croatian Cup: Hajduk Split

Women's football
- Prva HNLŽ: Split
- Druga HNLŽ: Hajduk Split (Group A); Koprivnica (Group B)
- Croatian Cup: Split

The following article presents a summary of the 2021–22 football season in Croatia, which is the 31st season of competitive football in the country.

== National teams ==
=== Croatia ===
| Date | Venue | Opponents | Score | Croatia scorer(s) | Report |
UEFA Euro 2020 – Group stage
| 13 June 2021 | Wembley Stadium, London | England | 0–1 | | UEFA.com |
| 18 June 2021 | Hampden Park, Glasgow | Czech Republic | 1–1 | Perišić | UEFA.com |
| 22 June 2021 | Hampden Park, Glasgow | Scotland | 3–1 | Vlašić, Modrić, Perišić | UEFA.com |
UEFA Euro 2020 - Knockout stage
| 28 June 2021 | Parken Stadium, Copenhagen | Spain | 3–5 (a.e.t.) | Pedri (o.g.), Oršić, Pašalić | UEFA.com |
2022 FIFA World Cup qualification – Group stage
| 1 September 2021 | Luzhniki Stadium, Moscow | Russia | 0–0 | | UEFA.com |
| 4 September 2021 | Tehelné pole, Bratislava | Slovakia | 1–0 | Brozović | UEFA.com |
| 7 September 2021 | Stadion Poljud, Split | Slovenia | 3–0 | Livaja, Pašalić, Vlašić | UEFA.com |
| 8 October 2021 | AEK Arena – Georgios Karapatakis, Larnaca | Cyprus | 3–0 | Perišić, Gvardiol, Livaja | UEFA.com |
| 11 October 2021 | Stadion Gradski vrt, Osijek | Slovakia | 2–2 | Kramarić, Modrić | UEFA.com |
| 11 November 2021 | National Stadium, Ta' Qali | Malta | 7–1 | Perišić, Ćaleta-Car, Pašalić, Modrić, Majer (2), Kramarić | UEFA.com |
| 14 November 2021 | Stadion Poljud, Split | Russia | 1–0 | Kudryashov (o.g.) | UEFA.com |
2022–23 UEFA Nations League – Group stage
| 3 June 2022 | Stadion Gradski vrt, Osijek | Austria | 0–3 | | UEFA.com |
| 6 June 2022 | Stadion Poljud, Split | France | 1–1 | Kramarić | UEFA.com |
| 10 June 2022 | Parken Stadium, Copenhagen | Denmark | 1–0 | Pašalić | UEFA.com |
| 13 June 2022 | Stade de France, Saint-Denis | France | 1–0 | Modrić | UEFA.com |
Friendly fixtures
| 26 March 2022 | Education City Stadium, Al Rayyan | Slovenia | 1–1 | Kramarić | |
| 29 March 2022 | Education City Stadium, Al Rayyan | Bulgaria | 2–1 | Modrić, Kramarić | |

=== Croatia U21 ===
| Date | Venue | Opponents | Score | Croatia scorer(s) | Report |
2023 UEFA European Under-21 Championship qualification - Group stage
| 1 September 2021 | Stadion Radnik, Velika Gorica | Azerbaijan | 2–0 | Sučić, Šimić | UEFA.com |
| 6 September 2021 | Raatti Stadium, Oulu | Finland | 2–0 | Sučić, Ljubičić | UEFA.com |
| 7 October 2021 | Stadion Varteks, Varaždin | Norway | 3–2 | Šimić, Sučić, Vušković | UEFA.com |
| 12 October 2021 | Kapital Bank Arena, Sumqayit | Azerbaijan | 5–1 | Šimić (3), Soldo, Šutalo | UEFA.com |
| 11 November 2021 | Stadion Aldo Drosina, Pula | Estonia | 2–0 | Šimić, Pršir | UEFA.com |
| 16 November 2021 | Keine Sorgen Arena, Ried im Innkreis | Austria | 3–1 | Kačavenda, Franjić, Sučić | UEFA.com |
| 25 March 2022 | Stadion Varteks, Varaždin | Austria | 0–0 | | UEFA.com |
| 29 March 2022 | Stadion Varteks, Varaždin | Finland | 2–3 | Šutalo, Fruk | UEFA.com |
| 3 June 2022 | Marienlyst Stadion, Drammen | Norway | 2–3 | Sučić, Šimić | UEFA.com |
| 8 June 2022 | Pärnu Rannastaadion, Pärnu | Estonia | 4–0 | Vidović, Vušković, Marin, Fruk | UEFA.com |

=== Croatia U19 ===
| Date | Venue | Opponents | Score | Croatia scorer(s) | Report |
2022 UEFA European Under-19 Championship qualification - Qualifying round
| 10 November 2021 | Stadion Branko Čavlović-Čavlek, Karlovac | Gibraltar | 7–0 | Frigan (3), Špeljak, Stojković, Lisica, Ivanović | UEFA.com |
| 13 November 2021 | Stadion Branko Čavlović-Čavlek, Karlovac | Armenia | 2–0 | Špeljak, Frigan | UEFA.com |
| 16 November 2021 | Stadion Branko Čavlović-Čavlek, Karlovac | Scotland | 1–1 | Ivanović | UEFA.com |
2022 UEFA European Under-19 Championship qualification - Elite round
| 23 March 2022 | Stadion Branko Čavlović-Čavlek, Karlovac | Iceland | 2–1 | Stojković, Cvijanović | UEFA.com |
| 26 March 2022 | Stadion Branko Čavlović-Čavlek, Karlovac | Romania | 1–2 | Špeljak | UEFA.com |
| 29 March 2022 | Stadion Branko Čavlović-Čavlek, Karlovac | Georgia | 0–1 | | UEFA.com |

=== Croatia U17 ===
| Date | Venue | Opponents | Score | Croatia scorer(s) | Report |
2022 UEFA European Under-17 Championship qualification - Qualifying round
| 21 October 2021 | Sports Center of FA of Serbia, Stara Pazova | Bulgaria | 0–1 | | UEFA.com |
| 24 October 2021 | Sports Center of FA of Serbia, Stara Pazova | Liechtenstein | 3–0 | Ivković, Weissenhofer (o.g.), Košćević | UEFA.com |
| 27 October 2021 | Sports Center of FA of Serbia, Stara Pazova | Serbia | 0–1 | | UEFA.com |

=== Croatia Women's ===
| Date | Venue | Opponents | Score | Croatia scorer(s) | Report |
2023 FIFA Women's World Cup qualification - Group stage
| 17 September 2021 | Stadionul Mogoșoaia, Mogoșoaia | Romania | 0–2 | | UEFA.com |
| 21 September 2021 | Stadion Branko Čavlović-Čavlek, Karlovac | Italy | 0–5 | | UEFA.com |
| 22 October 2021 | Stadio Teofilo Patini, Castel di Sangro | Italy | 0–3 | | UEFA.com |
| 26 October 2021 | Letzigrund, Zürich | Switzerland | 0–5 | | UEFA.com |
| 26 November 2021 | Stadion Aldo Drosina, Pula | Lithuania | 0–0 | | UEFA.com |
| 30 November 2021 | Stadion Aldo Drosina, Pula | Moldova | 4–0 | Marković, Landeka, Lubina, Jelenčić | UEFA.com |
| 8 April 2022 | Zimbru Stadium, Chișinău | Moldova | 1–0 | Ljuština | UEFA.com |
| 12 April 2022 | Stadion Radnik, Velika Gorica | Romania | 0–1 | | UEFA.com |

=== Croatia Women's U19 ===
| Date | Venue | Opponents | Score | Croatia scorer(s) | Report |
2022 UEFA Women's Under-19 Championship qualification - Round 1
| 19 October 2021 | Stadion Aldo Drosina, Pula | Liechtenstein | 2–0 | Matanić, Krznarić | UEFA.com |
| 22 October 2021 | Stadion Aldo Drosina, Pula | Latvia | 3–1 | Šabašov, Domazet, Blažević | UEFA.com |
| 25 October 2021 | Stadion Aldo Drosina, Pula | Kosovo | 1–0 | Avdili (o.g.) | UEFA.com |
2022 UEFA Women's Under-19 Championship qualification - Round 2
| 6 April 2022 | Borås Arena, Borås | Denmark | 0–2 | | UEFA.com |
| 9 April 2022 | Borås Arena, Borås | Sweden | 0–4 | | UEFA.com |
| 12 April 2022 | Bravida Arena, Gothenburg | Poland | 0–6 | | UEFA.com |

=== Croatia Women's U17 ===
| Date | Venue | Opponents | Score | Croatia scorer(s) | Report |
2022 UEFA Women's Under-17 Championship qualification - Round 1
| 23 September 2021 | Stadion Lučko, Zagreb | Armenia | 5–0 | Mikulica, Živković, Čorak, Kovačević, Višnjić | UEFA.com |
| 26 September 2021 | Stadion Lučko, Zagreb | Kazakhstan | 7–0 | Mikulica, Kovačević (2), Damjanović, Vračević, Šaban, Vlastelica | UEFA.com |
| 29 September 2021 | Stadion Lučko, Zagreb | Lithuania | 2–0 | Živković, Kovačević | UEFA.com |
2022 UEFA Women's Under-17 Championship qualification - Round 2
| 24 March 2022 | Stadion RKS Garbarnia, Kraków | Poland | 0–5 | | UEFA.com |
| 27 March 2022 | Stadion Miejski, Niepołomice | France | 0–5 | | UEFA.com |
| 30 March 2022 | Stadion RKS Garbarnia, Kraków | England | 0–8 | | UEFA.com |

== League tables ==
=== Croatian First Football League ===
| Pos | Team | Pld | W | D | L | GF | GA | GD | Pts | Qualification or relegation |
|---|---|---|---|---|---|---|---|---|---|---|
| 1 | Dinamo Zagreb (C) | 36 | 24 | 7 | 5 | 68 | 22 | +46 | 79 | Qualification to Champions League second qualifying round |
| 2 | Hajduk Split | 36 | 21 | 9 | 6 | 64 | 31 | +33 | 72 | Qualification to Europa Conference League third qualifying round (Note: The cup winner, Hajduk Split, will enter the third qualifying round of the Europa Conference League.) |
| 3 | Osijek | 36 | 19 | 12 | 5 | 49 | 29 | +20 | 69 | Qualification to Europa Conference League second qualifying round |
| 4 | Rijeka | 36 | 20 | 5 | 11 | 71 | 51 | +20 | 65 | Qualification to Europa Conference League second qualifying round |
| 5 | Lokomotiva | 36 | 12 | 13 | 11 | 55 | 50 | +5 | 49 | |
| 6 | Gorica | 36 | 12 | 9 | 15 | 43 | 50 | −7 | 45 | |
| 7 | Slaven Belupo | 36 | 9 | 9 | 18 | 35 | 54 | −19 | 36 | |
| 8 | Šibenik | 36 | 9 | 5 | 22 | 46 | 75 | −29 | 32 | |
| 9 | Istra 1961 | 36 | 7 | 10 | 19 | 42 | 67 | −25 | 31 | |
| 10 | Hrvatski Dragovoljac (R) | 36 | 4 | 7 | 25 | 31 | 75 | −44 | 19 | Relegation to First Football League |

Source: PrvaHNL.hr
Rules for classification: 1) Points; 2) Head-to-head points; 3) Head-to-head goal difference; 4) Head-to-head goals scored (at home if two teams tied); 5) Goal difference; 6) Goals scored; 7) Play-off
(Note: Criteria 2-4 and 7 is only used if deciding champion, teams to international competition or teams for relegation and in that case criteria 6 will not be used).
(C) Champions; (R) Relegated

=== Croatian Second Football League ===
| Pos | Team | Pld | W | D | L | GF | GA | GD | Pts | Qualification or relegation (Note: Dinamo Zagreb II and Osijek II were ineligible for promotion.) |
|---|---|---|---|---|---|---|---|---|---|---|
| 1 | Varaždin (C, P) | 30 | 19 | 6 | 5 | 56 | 29 | +27 | 63 | Promotion to the HNL |
| 2 | Rudeš | 30 | 17 | 5 | 8 | 56 | 27 | +29 | 56 | |
| 3 | Inter Zaprešić (X) | 30 | 13 | 9 | 8 | 34 | 29 | +5 | 48 | Dissolved after the season (Note: Due to change in regulation, reserve teams of top level clubs (Dinamo Zagreb II and Osijek II) were not allowed to participate in second level from the following season. Later Dinamo II was dissolved.) |
| 4 | Jarun | 30 | 11 | 11 | 8 | 46 | 38 | +8 | 44 | |
| 5 | Kustošija | 30 | 11 | 9 | 10 | 39 | 35 | +4 | 42 | |
| 6 | Cibalia | 30 | 11 | 8 | 11 | 44 | 42 | +2 | 41 | |
| 7 | Dinamo Zagreb II (X) | 30 | 11 | 8 | 11 | 37 | 44 | −7 | 41 | Dissolved after the season |
| 8 | Solin | 30 | 11 | 7 | 12 | 41 | 41 | 0 | 40 | |
| 9 | Orijent 1919 | 30 | 12 | 4 | 14 | 44 | 49 | −5 | 40 | |
| 10 | Dugopolje | 30 | 11 | 7 | 12 | 40 | 46 | −6 | 40 | |
| 11 | Dubrava | 30 | 11 | 6 | 13 | 39 | 39 | 0 | 39 | |
| 12 | BSK Bijelo Brdo | 30 | 11 | 6 | 13 | 30 | 41 | −11 | 39 | |
| 13 | Croatia Zmijavci (R) | 30 | 11 | 5 | 14 | 32 | 43 | −11 | 38 | Relegation to the 2. NL |
| 14 | Sesvete (R) | 30 | 9 | 7 | 14 | 37 | 41 | −4 | 34 | Relegation to the 2. NL |
| 15 | Osijek II (R) | 30 | 9 | 7 | 14 | 25 | 36 | −11 | 34 | Relegation to the 2. NL |
| 16 | Opatija (R) | 30 | 6 | 7 | 17 | 27 | 47 | −20 | 25 | Relegation to the 2. NL |

Updated to match(es) played on 28 May 2022. Source: Druga-HNL.com
Rules for classification: 1) Points; 2) Head-to-head points; 3) Head-to-head goal difference; 4) Head-to-head goals scored (at home if two teams tied); 5) Goal difference; 6) Goals scored; 7) Play-off
(Note: Criteria 2-4 and 7 is only used if deciding champion, teams for promotion or relegation and in that case criteria 6 will not be used).
(C) Champions; (P) Promoted; (R) Relegated; (X) Dissolved

== Croatian clubs in Europe ==
=== Summary ===
| Club | Competition | Starting round | Final round | Matches played |
|---|---|---|---|---|
| Dinamo Zagreb | Champions League | 1st qualifying round | Play-off round | 8 |
| Dinamo Zagreb | Europa League | Group stage | Knockout round play-offs | 8 |
| Osijek | Conference League | 2nd qualifying round | 3rd qualifying round | 4 |
| Rijeka | Conference League | 2nd qualifying round | Play-off round | 6 |
| Hajduk Split | Conference League | 2nd qualifying round | | 2 |
| ŽNK Osijek | Women's Champions League | 1st qualifying round | 2nd qualifying round | 4 |
| Hajduk Split U19 | UEFA Youth League | First round | Play-offs | 5 |

=== Dinamo Zagreb ===
| Date | Venue | Opponents | Score | Dinamo Zagreb scorer(s) | Report |
2021–22 Champions League - First qualifying round
| 7 July 2021 | Stadion Maksimir, Zagreb | (Iceland) Valur | 3–2 | Ademi (2), Majer | UEFA.com |
| 13 July 2021 | Hlíðarendi, Reykjavík | (Iceland) Valur | 2–0 | Ivanušec, Oršić | UEFA.com |
2021–22 Champions League - Second qualifying round
| 20 July 2021 | Stadion Maksimir, Zagreb | (Cyprus) Omonia | 2–0 | Majer, Jakić | UEFA.com |
| 27 July 2021 | GSP Stadium, Strovolos | (Cyprus) Omonia | 1–0 | Menalo | UEFA.com |
2021–22 Champions League - Third qualifying round
| 4 August 2021 | Stadion Maksimir, Zagreb | (Poland) Legia Warsaw | 1–1 | Petković | UEFA.com |
| 10 August 2021 | Stadion Wojska Polskiego, Warsaw | (Poland) Legia Warsaw | 1–0 | Franjić | UEFA.com |
2021–22 Champions League - Play-off round
| 17 August 2021 | Sheriff Stadium, Tiraspol | (Moldova) Sheriff Tiraspol | 0–3 | | UEFA.com |
| 25 August 2021 | Stadion Maksimir, Zagreb | (Moldova) Sheriff Tiraspol | 0–0 | | UEFA.com |
2021–22 UEFA Europa League - Group stage
| 16 September 2021 | Stadion Maksimir, Zagreb | (England) West Ham United | 0–2 | | UEFA.com |
| 30 September 2021 | Luminus Arena, Genk | (Belgium) Genk | 3–0 | Ivanušec, Petković (2) | UEFA.com |
| 21 October 2021 | Allianz Stadion, Vienna | (Austria) Rapid Wien | 1–2 | Oršić | UEFA.com |
| 4 November 2021 | Stadion Maksimir, Zagreb | (Austria) Rapid Wien | 3–1 | Petković, Andrić, Šutalo | UEFA.com |
| 25 November 2021 | Stadion Maksimir, Zagreb | (Belgium) Genk | 1–1 | Menalo | UEFA.com |
| 9 December 2021 | London Stadium, London | (England) West Ham United | 1–0 | Oršić | UEFA.com |
2021–22 UEFA Europa League - Knockout round play-offs
| 17 February 2022 | Ramón Sánchez Pizjuán Stadium, Seville | (Spain) Sevilla | 1–3 | Oršić | UEFA.com |
| 24 February 2022 | Stadion Maksimir, Zagreb | (Spain) Sevilla | 1–0 | Oršić | UEFA.com |

=== Osijek ===
| Date | Venue | Opponents | Score | Osijek scorer(s) | Report |
2021–22 Conference League - Second qualifying round
| 22 July 2021 | Stadion Miejski, Szczecin | (Poland) Pogoń Szczecin | 0–0 | | UEFA.com |
| 29 July 2021 | Stadion Gradski vrt, Osijek | (Poland) Pogoń Szczecin | 1–0 | Kleinheisler | UEFA.com |
2021–22 Conference League - Third qualifying round
| 5 August 2021 | Vasil Levski National Stadium, Sofia | (Bulgaria) CSKA Sofia | 2–4 | Mattheij (o.g.), Topčagić | UEFA.com |
| 12 August 2021 | Stadion Gradski vrt, Osijek | (Bulgaria) CSKA Sofia | 1–1 | Škorić | UEFA.com |

=== Rijeka ===
| Date | Venue | Opponents | Score | Rijeka scorer(s) | Report |
2021–22 Conference League - Second qualifying round
| 22 July 2021 | Centenary Stadium, Ta'Qali | (Malta) Gżira United | 2–0 | Bušnja, Ampem | UEFA.com |
| 29 July 2021 | Stadion Rujevica, Rijeka | (Malta) Gżira United | 1–0 | Drmić | UEFA.com |
2021–22 Conference League - Third qualifying round
| 5 August 2021 | Easter Road, Edinburgh | (Scotland) Hibernian | 1–1 | Ampem | UEFA.com |
| 12 August 2021 | Stadion Rujevica, Rijeka | (Scotland) Hibernian | 4–1 | Pavičić, Issah, McGinn (o.g.), Bušnja | UEFA.com |
2021–22 Conference League - Play-off round
| 19 August 2021 | Toumba Stadium, Thessaloniki | (Greece) PAOK | 1–1 | Lepinjica | UEFA.com |
| 26 August 2021 | Stadion Rujevica, Rijeka | (Greece) PAOK | 0–2 | | UEFA.com |

=== Hajduk Split ===
| Date | Venue | Opponents | Score | Hajduk Split scorer(s) | Report |
2021–22 Conference League - Second qualifying round
| 22 July 2021 | Stadion Poljud, Split | (Kazakhstan) Tobol | 2–0 | Ljubičić (2) | UEFA.com |
| 29 July 2021 | Kostanay Central Stadium, Kostanay | (Kazakhstan) Tobol | 1–4 (a.e.t.) | Sahiti | UEFA.com |

=== ŽNK Osijek ===
| Date | Venue | Opponents | Score | ŽNK Osijek scorer(s) | Report |
2021–22 UEFA Women's Champions League - First qualifying round
| 18 August 2021 | Stadion Gradski vrt, Osijek | (Montenegro) Breznica Pljevlja | 5–0 | Nevrkla, Lubina, Joščak, Kovačević, Balić | UEFA.com |
| 21 August 2021 | Stadion Gradski vrt, Osijek | (Belgium) Anderlecht | 1–0 | Lojna | UEFA.com |
2021–22 UEFA Women's Champions League - Second qualifying round
| 1 September 2021 | Stadion Gradski vrt, Osijek | (Iceland) Breiðablik | 1–1 | Medić | UEFA.com |
| 9 September 2021 | Kópavogsvöllur, Kópavogur | (Iceland) Breiðablik | 0–3 | | UEFA.com |

=== Hajduk Split U19 ===
| Date | Venue | Opponents | Score | Hajduk Split U19 scorer(s) | Report |
2021–22 UEFA Youth League Domestic Champions Path - First round
| 30 September 2021 | Petar Miloševski Training Centre, Skopje | (North Macedonia) Shkëndija | 2–0 | Čuić (2) | UEFA.com |
| 20 October 2021 | Stadion Poljud, Split | (North Macedonia) Shkëndija | 3–1 | Antunović, Čuić, Brkljača | UEFA.com |
2021–22 UEFA Youth League Domestic Champions Path - Second round
| 3 November 2021 | Stadion Poljud, Split | (Belarus) Minsk | 3–0 | Hrgović, Čuić (2) | UEFA.com |
| 24 November 2021 | FC Minsk Stadium, Minsk | (Belarus) Minsk | 1–1 | Čuić | UEFA.com |
2021–22 UEFA Youth League - Play-offs
| 9 February 2022 | Stadion Poljud, Split | (Spain) Atlético Madrid | 0–0 (2–3 p) | | UEFA.com |
