= Vasco Gervásio =

Portuguese footballer (1943–2009)

Personal information
- Full name: Vasco Manuel Vieira Pereira Gervásio
- Date of birth: 5 December 1943
- Place of birth: Malveira, Portugal
- Date of death: 3 July 2009 (aged 65)
- Place of death: Coimbra, Portugal
- Position: Midfielder

Youth career
- 1959–1961: Benfica

Senior career*
Years	Team	Apps	(Gls)
1962–1979	Académica de Coimbra	355	(43)

Managerial career
- 1983–1984: Académica de Coimbra
- * Club domestic league appearances and goals

Vasco Manuel Vieira Pereira Gervásio (5 December 1943 – 3 July 2009) was a Portuguese football player and coach.

He played 15 seasons and 330 games in the Primeira Liga, all for Académica de Coimbra.

== Club career ==
He made his Primeira Liga debut for Académica de Coimbra on 28 October 1962 in a game against Benfica.
