= 2021–22 in Italian football =

Football in Italy
- Season: 2021–22

Men's football
- Serie A: Milan
- Serie B: Lecce
- Serie C: Südtirol (Group A); Modena (Group B); Bari (Group C)
- Serie D: Recanatese
- Coppa Italia: Internazionale
- Coppa Italia Serie C: Padova
- Supercoppa Italiana: Internazionale

Women's football
- Serie A: Juventus
- Coppa Italia: Juventus
- Supercoppa Italiana: Juventus

The 2021–22 season was the 120th season of competitive football in Italy.

== National teams ==
=== Men ===
==== Italy national football team ====
===== Friendlies =====
29 March 2022	Turkey	2–3	Italy	Konya, Turkey
21:45	Ünder 4'; Dursun 83'	Report	Cristante 35'; Raspadori 39', 69'	Stadium: Konya Metropolitan Municipality Stadium; Referee: Enea Jorgji (Albania)

===== 2021 UEFA Nations League Finals =====
6 October 2021 2021 UEFA Nations League SF	Italy	1–2	Spain	Milan, Italy
20:45 CEST (UTC+02:00)	Pellegrini 83'	Report	F. Torres 17', 45+2'	Stadium: San Siro; Attendance: 33,524; Referee: Sergei Karasev (Russia)

10 October 2021 2021 UEFA Nations League 3rd	Italy	2–1	Belgium	Turin, Italy
15:00 CEST (UTC+02:00)	Barella 46'; Berardi 65' (pen.)	Report	De Ketelaere 86'	Stadium: Juventus Stadium; Attendance: 16,724; Referee: Srđan Jovanović (Serbia)

===== 2022 FIFA World Cup qualification =====
====== Group C ======
Pos	Team	Pld	W	D	L	GF	GA	GD	Pts	Qualification	Switzerland	Italy		Bulgaria	Lithuania
1	Switzerland	8	5	3	0	15	2	+13	18	Qualification for 2022 FIFA World Cup	—	0–0	2–0	4–0	1–0
2	Italy	8	4	4	0	13	2	+11	16	Advance to play-offs	1–1	—	2–0	1–1	5–0
3	Northern Ireland	8	2	3	3	6	7	−1	9		0–0	0–0	—	0–0	1–0
4	Bulgaria	8	2	2	4	6	14	−8	8		1–3	0–2	2–1	—	1–0
5	Lithuania	8	1	0	7	4	19	−15	3		0–4	0–2	1–4	3–1	—

Source: FIFA, UEFA
Rules for classification: Tiebreakers

2 September 2021	Italy	1–1	Bulgaria	Florence, Italy
20:45 CEST (UTC+02:00)	Chiesa 16'	Report	Iliev 39'	Stadium: Stadio Artemio Franchi; Referee: Serdar Gözübüyük (Netherlands)

5 September 2021	Switzerland	0–0	Italy	Basel, Switzerland
20:45 CEST (UTC+02:00)		Report		Stadium: St. Jakob-Park; Referee: Carlos del Cerro Grande (Spain)

8 September 2021	Italy	5–0	Lithuania	Reggio Emilia, Italy
20:45 CEST (UTC+02:00)	Kean 11', 29'; Utkus 14' (o.g.); Raspadori 24'; Di Lorenzo 54'	Report		Stadium: Stadio Città del Tricolore; Referee: Craig Pawson (England)

12 November 2021	Italy	1–1	Switzerland	Rome, Italy
20:45 CET (UTC+01:00)	Di Lorenzo 36'	Report	Widmer 11'	Stadium: Stadio Olimpico; Referee: Anthony Taylor (England)

15 November 2021	Northern Ireland	0–0	Italy	Belfast, Northern Ireland
20:45 CET (UTC+01:00)		Report		Stadium: Windsor Park; Referee: István Kovács (Romania)

====== Second round ======
24 March 2022 2022 FIFA World Cup qualifying	Italy	0–1	North Macedonia	Palermo, Italy
20:45 CET (UTC+01:00)		Report	Trajkovski 90+2'	Stadium: Stadio Renzo Barbera; Referee: Clément Turpin (France)

===== UEFA Euro 2020 =====
====== Knockout phase ======
2 July 2021 QF	Belgium	1–2	Italy	Munich, Germany
21:00 CEST	Lukaku 45+2' (pen.)	Report	Barella 31'; Insigne 44'	Stadium: Allianz Arena; Attendance: 12,984; Referee: Slavko Vinčić (Slovenia)

6 July 2021 SF	Italy	1–1 (a.e.t.) (4–2 p)	Spain	London, England
21:00 CEST	Chiesa 60'	Report	Morata 80'	Stadium: Wembley Stadium; Attendance: 57,811; Referee: Felix Brych (Germany)
	Penalties
	Locatelli (penalty missed); Belotti (penalty scored); Bonucci (penalty scored); Bernardeschi (penalty scored); Jorginho (penalty scored)		(penalty missed) Olmo; (penalty scored) Gerard; (penalty scored) Thiago; (penalty missed) Morata

====== Final ======
11 July 2021
21:00 (20:00 UTC+1)

Italy	1–1 (a.e.t.)	England
Bonucci 67'	Report	Shaw 2'
Penalties
Berardi (penalty scored); Belotti (penalty missed); Bonucci (penalty scored); Bernardeschi (penalty scored); Jorginho (penalty missed)	3–2	(penalty scored) Kane; (penalty scored) Maguire; (penalty missed) Rashford; (penalty missed) Sancho; (penalty missed) Saka

Wembley Stadium, London
Attendance: 67,173
Referee: Björn Kuipers (Netherlands)

===== 2022 Finalissima =====
1 June 2022
19:45 BST

Italy	0–3	Argentina
	Report	La. Martínez 28'; Di María 45+1'; Dybala 90+4'

Wembley Stadium, London
Attendance: 87,112
Referee: Piero Maza (Chile)

===== UEFA Nations League =====
====== Group 3 ======
Pos	Team	Pld	W	D	L	GF	GA	GD	Pts	Qualification or relegation	(Italy)	(Hungary)	(Germany)	(England)
1	Italy	6	3	2	1	8	7	+1	11	Qualification for Nations League Finals	—	2–1	1–1	1–0
2	Hungary	6	3	1	2	8	5	+3	10		0–2	—	1–1	1–0
3	Germany	6	1	4	1	11	9	+2	7		5–2	0–1	—	1–1
4	England (R)	6	0	3	3	4	10	−6	3	Relegation to League B	0–0	0–4	3–3	—

Source: UEFA
(R) Relegated

4 June 2022	Italy	1–1	Germany	Bologna, Italy
20:45	Pellegrini 70'	Report	Kimmich 73'	Stadium: Stadio Renato Dall'Ara; Attendance: 23,754; Referee: Srdjan Jovanović (Serbia)

7 June 2022	Italy	2–1	Hungary	Cesena, Italy
20:45	Barella 30'; Pellegrini 45'	Report	Mancini 61' (o.g.)	Stadium: Stadio Dino Manuzzi; Attendance: 14,942; Referee: Sandro Schärer (Switzerland)

11 June 2022	England	0–0	Italy	Wolverhampton, England
20:45 (19:45 UTC+1)		Report		Stadium: Molineux Stadium; Attendance: 1,782; Referee: Szymon Marciniak (Poland)

14 June 2022	Germany	5–2	Italy	Mönchengladbach, Germany
20:45	Kimmich 10'; Gündoğan 45+4' (pen.); Müller 51'; Werner 68', 69'	Report	Gnonto 78'; Bastoni 90+1'	Stadium: Borussia-Park; Attendance: 44,144; Referee: István Kovács (Romania)

=== Women ===
==== Italy women's national football team ====
===== 2023 FIFA Women's World Cup qualification =====
====== Group G ======
Pos	Team	Pld	W	D	L	GF	GA	GD	Pts	Qualification	(Italy)	(Switzerland)	(Romania)	(Croatia)	(Lithuania)	(Moldova)
1	Italy	10	9	0	1	40	2	+38	27	2023 FIFA Women's World Cup	—	1–2	2–0	3–0	7–0	3–0
2	Switzerland	10	8	1	1	44	4	+40	25	Play-offs	0–1	—	2–0	5–0	4–1	15–0
3	Romania	10	6	1	3	21	11	+10	19		0–5	1–1	—	2–0	3–0	3–0
4	Croatia	10	3	1	6	6	18	−12	10		0–5	0–2	0–1	—	0–0	4–0
5	Lithuania	10	1	2	7	7	35	−28	5		0–5	0–7	1–7	0–1	—	4–0
6	Moldova	10	0	1	9	1	49	−48	1		0–8	0–6	0–4	0–1	1–1	—

Source: UEFA
Rules for classification: Tiebreakers

17 September 2021 2023 Women's World Cup qualification	Italy	3–0	Moldova	Trieste, Italy
17:30	Girelli 16', 28' (pen.); Giacinti 35'	Report		Stadium: Stadio Nereo Rocco; Referee: Lorraine Watson (Scotland)

21 September 2021 2023 Women's World Cup qualification	Croatia	0–5	Italy	Karlovac, Croatia
18:00		Report	Gama 17'; Giacinti 31', 47'; Girelli 50'; Cernoia 90+1' (pen.)	Stadium: Stadion Branko Čavlović-Čavlek; Referee: Marta Huerta De Aza (Spain)

22 October 2021 2023 Women's World Cup qualification	Italy	3–0	Croatia	Castel di Sangro, Italy
17:30	Cernoia 2'; Girelli 9' (pen.); Pirone 64'	Report		Stadium: Stadio Teofilo Patini; Referee: Petra Pavlikova (Slovakia)

26 October 2021 2023 Women's World Cup qualification	Lithuania	0–5	Italy	Vilnius, Lithuania
18:30		Report	Cernoia 13'; Pirone 23'; Giacinti 35'; Gama 54'; Caruso 83'	Stadium: LFF Stadium; Referee: Jelena Medjedovic (Serbia)

26 November 2021 2023 Women's World Cup qualification	Italy	1–2	Switzerland	Palermo, Italy
17:30	Bonansea 60'	Report	Sow 9'; Crnogorčević 20'	Stadium: Stadio Renzo Barbera; Referee: Stéphanie Frappart (France)

30 November 2021 2023 Women's World Cup qualification	Romania	0–5	Italy	Voluntari, Romania
18:30		Report	Bonansea 22'; Girelli 53', 61', 90+4' (pen.); Valeria Pirone 87'	Stadium: Stadionul Anghel Iordănescu; Referee: Catarina Campos (Portugal)

8 April 2022 2023 FIFA Women's World Cup qualification– UEFAGroup G	Italy	7–0	Lithuania	Parma, Italy
19:00	Caruso 2', 45+1'; Bergamaschi 41', 89'; Cernoia 61'; Sabatino 86'; Bonetti 90+2'	Report		Stadium: Stadio Ennio Tardini; Referee: Elvira Nurmustafina (Kazakhstan)

12 April 2022 2023 FIFA Women's World Cup qualification– UEFAGroup G	Switzerland	0–1	Italy	Thun, Switzerland
17:45		Report	Girelli 83'	Stadium: Stockhorn Arena; Referee: Rebecca Welch (England)

===== 2022 Algarve Cup =====
Pos	Team	Pld	W	D	L	GF	GA	GD	Pts	Qualification
1	Sweden	2	2	0	0	7	0	+7	6	Final
2	Italy	2	2	0	0	3	1	+2	6	Final
3	Portugal	2	1	0	1	2	4	−2	3	Third-place match
4	Norway	2	0	0	2	1	4	−3	0	Third-place match
5	Denmark (Note: On 17 February, the Danish team withdrew following the discovery of four COVID-19 cases within the team.)	2	0	0	2	0	4	−4	0	Withdrew

Source: FPF
Rules for classification: 1) Points; 2) Goal difference; 3) Goals scored; 4) Head-to-head points; 5) Head-to-head goal difference.
Notes:

16 February 2022	Denmark	0–1	Italy	Lagos, Portugal
		Report	Bonansea 50'	Stadium: Estádio Municipal de Lagos

20 February 2022	Italy	2–1	Norway	Algarve, Portugal
	Giacinti 10'; Caruso 28'		Ildhusøy 45+3'	Stadium: Estádio Algarve

====== Final ======
23 February 2022	Sweden	1–1 (6–5 p)	Italy	Lagos, Portugal
	Seger 72' (pen.)		Giacinti 18'	Stadium: Estádio Municipal de Lagos
	Penalties
	Seger (penalty scored); Asllani (penalty scored); Blackstenius (penalty scored); Berglund (penalty scored); Angeldal (penalty scored); Lindahl (penalty scored)		(penalty scored) Giugliano; (penalty scored) Gama; (penalty scored) Girelli; (penalty scored) Cernoia; (penalty scored) Caruso; (penalty missed) Serturini

== League season ==
=== Men ===
==== Promotions and relegations (pre-season) ====
Teams promoted to Serie A

- Empoli
- Salernitana
- Venezia

Teams relegated from Serie A

- Benevento
- Parma
- Crotone

Teams promoted to Serie B

- Como (Group A)
- Perugia (Group B)
- Ternana (Group C)
- Alessandria (Play-Off Winner)

Teams relegated from Serie B

- Chievo (excluded)
- Reggiana
- Pescara
- Virtus Entella

==== Serie A ====
Pos	Team	Pld	W	D	L	GF	GA	GD	Pts	Qualification or relegation
1	Milan (C)	38	26	8	4	69	31	+38	86	Qualification for the Champions League group stage
2	Inter Milan	38	25	9	4	84	32	+52	84	Qualification for the Champions League group stage
3	Napoli	38	24	7	7	74	31	+43	79	Qualification for the Champions League group stage
4	Juventus	38	20	10	8	57	37	+20	70	Qualification for the Champions League group stage
5	Lazio	38	18	10	10	77	58	+19	64	Qualification for the Europa League group stage (Note: Since the winners of the 2021–22 Coppa Italia, Inter Milan, qualified for the Champions League, the Europa League berth awarded to the Coppa Italia winners was passed to the sixth-placed team, and the Europa Conference League berth awarded to the sixth-placed team was passed to the seventh-placed team.)
6	Roma	38	18	9	11	59	43	+16	63	Qualification for the Europa League group stage
7	Fiorentina	38	19	5	14	59	51	+8	62	Qualification for the Conference League play-off round
8	Atalanta	38	16	11	11	65	48	+17	59	
9	Hellas Verona	38	14	11	13	65	59	+6	53	
10	Torino	38	13	11	14	46	41	+5	50 (Note: Torino finished ahead of Sassuolo on head-to-head points: Sassuolo 0–1 Torino, Torino 1–1 Sassuolo.)	
11	Sassuolo	38	13	11	14	64	66	−2	50	
12	Udinese	38	11	14	13	61	58	+3	47	
13	Bologna	38	12	10	16	44	55	−11	46	
14	Empoli	38	10	11	17	50	70	−20	41	
15	Sampdoria	38	10	6	22	46	63	−17	36	
16	Spezia	38	10	6	22	41	71	−30	36	
17	Salernitana	38	7	10	21	33	78	−45	31	
18	Cagliari (R)	38	6	12	20	34	68	−34	30	Relegation to Serie B
19	Genoa (R)	38	4	16	18	27	60	−33	28	Relegation to Serie B
20	Venezia (R)	38	6	9	23	34	69	−35	27	Relegation to Serie B

Source: Serie A
Rules for classification: 1) Points; 2) Head-to-head points; 3) Head-to-head goal difference; 4) Goal difference; 5) Goals scored; 6) Draw. (Note: Head-to-head record is used only after all the matches between the teams in question have been played)
(C) Champions; (R) Relegated

==== Serie B ====
Pos	Team	Pld	W	D	L	GF	GA	GD	Pts	Promotion, qualification or relegation
1	Lecce (C, P)	38	19	14	5	59	31	+28	71	Promotion to Serie A
2	Cremonese (P)	38	20	9	9	57	39	+18	69	Promotion to Serie A
3	Pisa	38	18	13	7	48	35	+13	67 (Note: Pisa finished ahead of Monza on head-to-head points: Pisa 2–1 Monza, Monza 1–2 Pisa.)	Qualification for promotion play-offs semi-finals
4	Monza (O, P)	38	19	10	9	60	38	+22	67	Qualification for promotion play-offs semi-finals
5	Brescia	38	17	15	6	55	35	+20	66	Qualification for promotion play-offs preliminary round
6	Ascoli	38	19	8	11	52	42	+10	65	Qualification for promotion play-offs preliminary round
7	Benevento	38	18	9	11	62	39	+23	63	Qualification for promotion play-offs preliminary round
8	Perugia	38	14	16	8	40	32	+8	58 (Note: Perugia finished ahead of Frosinone on head-to-head points: Frosinone 0–0 Perugia, Perugia 3–0 Frosinone.)	Qualification for promotion play-offs preliminary round
9	Frosinone	38	15	13	10	58	45	+13	58	
10	Ternana	38	15	9	14	58	61	−3	54	
11	Cittadella	38	13	13	12	38	36	+2	52	
12	Parma	38	11	16	11	48	43	+5	49	
13	Como	38	11	14	13	49	54	−5	47	
14	Reggina (Note: Reggina were deducted 2 points for administrative irregularities.)	38	13	9	16	31	49	−18	46	
15	SPAL	38	9	15	14	46	54	−8	42	
16	Cosenza (O)	38	8	11	19	36	59	−23	35	Qualification for relegation play-out
17	Vicenza (R)	38	9	7	22	38	59	−21	34 (Note: Vicenza finished ahead of Alessandria on head-to-head points: Vicenza 2–1 Alessandria, Alessandria 0–1 Vicenza.)	Qualification for relegation play-out
18	Alessandria (R)	38	8	10	20	37	59	−22	34	Relegation to Serie C
19	Crotone (R)	38	4	14	20	41	61	−20	26	Relegation to Serie C
20	Pordenone (R)	38	3	9	26	29	71	−42	18	Relegation to Serie C

Source: Lega Serie B (in Italian), Soccerway (in English)
Rules for classification: 1) Points; 2) Head-to-head points; 3) Head-to-head goal difference; 4) Goal difference; 5) Goals scored; 6) Draw.
(C) Champions; (O) Play-off winners; (P) Promoted; (R) Relegated

==== Serie C ====
Group A (North)

Pos	Team	Pld	Pts
1	Südtirol (C, P)	38	90
2	Padova	38	85
3	Feralpisalò	38	69
4	Renate	38	62
5	Triestina	38	55
6	Lecco	38	55
7	Pro Vercelli	38	55
8	Juventus U23	38	54
9	Piacenza	38	50
10	Pergolettese	38	46
11	Pro Patria	38	45
12	AlbinoLeffe	38	45
13	Virtus Verona	38	45
14	Fiorenzuola	38	43
15	Mantova	38	42
16	Trento (O)	38	42
17	Pro Sesto (O)	38	38
18	Seregno (R)	38	34
19	Giana Erminio (R)	38	34
20	Legnago (R)	38	30

Source: Lega Pro, Soccerway (in English)
(C) Champions;
(O) Play-off winners;
(P) Promoted;
(R) Relegated
Group B (Centre)

Pos	Team	Pld	Pts
1	Modena (C, P)	38	88
2	Reggiana	38	86
3	Cesena	38	67
4	Virtus Entella	38	65
5	Pescara	38	65
6	Ancona-Matelica	38	57
7	Gubbio	38	52
8	Lucchese	38	50
9	Olbia	38	46
10	Carrarese	38	45
11	Vis Pesaro	38	45
12	Montevarchi	38	45
13	Siena	38	44
14	Pontedera	38	43
15	Teramo (D)	38	42
16	Viterbese (O)	38	39
17	Imolese (O)	38	37
18	Pistoiese (R)	38	36
19	Fermana	38	35
20	Grosseto (R)	38	30

Source: Lega Pro, Soccerway (in English)
(C) Champions;
(D) Disqualified;
(O) Play-off winners;
(P) Promoted;
(R) Relegated
Group C (South)

Pos	Team	Pld	Pts
1	Bari (C, P)	36	75
2	Catanzaro	36	67
3	Palermo (O, P)	36	66
4	Avellino	36	64
5	Monopoli	36	59
6	Virtus Francavilla	36	56
7	Foggia	36	54
8	Turris	36	52
9	Monterosi	36	51
10	Picerno	36	50
11	Juve Stabia	36	49
12	Latina	36	45
13	Campobasso (D)	36	44
14	ACR Messina	36	39
15	Taranto	36	39
16	Potenza	36	37
17	Fidelis Andria (O)	36	30
18	Paganese (R)	36	26
19	Vibonese (R)	36	21
20	Catania (D)	0	0

Source: Lega Pro, Soccerway (in English)
(C) Champions;
(D) Disqualified;
(O) Play-off winners;
(P) Promoted;
(R) Relegated

=== Women ===
==== Serie A (women) ====
Pos	Team	Pld	W	D	L	GF	GA	GD	Pts	Qualification or relegation
1	Juventus (C)	22	19	2	1	57	14	+43	59	Qualification to Champions League first round
2	Roma	22	17	3	2	60	18	+42	54	Qualification to Champions League first round
3	Milan	22	14	4	4	51	19	+32	46	
4	Sassuolo	22	13	4	5	44	24	+20	43	
5	Internazionale	22	12	2	8	42	30	+12	38	
6	Sampdoria	22	10	1	11	29	41	−12	31	
7	Fiorentina	22	7	3	12	40	38	+2	24	
8	Pomigliano	22	7	2	13	25	46	−21	23	
9	Empoli	22	6	5	11	26	40	−14	23	
10	Napoli (R)	22	5	4	13	17	30	−13	19	Relegation to Serie B
11	Lazio (R)	22	3	4	15	25	60	−35	13	Relegation to Serie B
12	Verona (R)	22	1	2	19	14	70	−56	5	Relegation to Serie B

Source: FIGC
Rules for classification: 1) Points; 2) Goal difference; 3) Number of goals scored; 4) Head-to-head points; 5) Head-to-head goal difference; 6) Head-to-head away goals scored
(C) Champions; (R) Relegated

== Cup competitions ==
=== Coppa Italia ===
==== Final ====
11 May 2022
21:00 CEST

Juventus	2–4 (a.e.t.)	Internazionale
Alex Sandro 50'; Vlahović 52'	Report	Barella 7'; Çalhanoğlu 80' (pen.); Perišić 99' (pen.), 102'

Stadio Olimpico, Rome
Attendance: 67,944
Referee: Paolo Valeri

=== Supercoppa Italiana ===
12 January 2022
21:00 CET

Inter Milan	2–1 (a.e.t.)	Juventus
Martínez 35' (pen.); Sánchez 120+1'	Report	McKennie 25'

San Siro, Milan
Attendance: 29,696 (Note: The total capacity of the stadium was established at 50% due to the COVID-19 pandemic in Italy.)
Referee: Daniele Doveri

=== Coppa Italia (women) ===
==== Final ====
22 May 2022

Juventus	2–1	Roma

Stadio Paolo Mazza, Ferrara

=== Supercoppa Italiana (women) ===
==== Final ====
8 January 2022
14:30 CET

Milan	1–2	Juventus
Grimshaw 45+1'	Report	Bergamaschi 50' (o.g.); Girelli 87'

Stadio Benito Stirpe, Frosinone
Referee: Maria Sole Ferrieri Caputi

== UEFA competitions ==
=== UEFA Champions League ===
==== Group stage ====
===== Group B =====
Pos	Team	Pld	W	D	L	GF	GA	GD	Pts	Qualification	LIV	ATM	POR	MIL
1	(England) Liverpool	6	6	0	0	17	6	+11	18	Advance to knockout phase	—	2–0	2–0	3–2
2	(Spain) Atlético Madrid	6	2	1	3	7	8	−1	7	Advance to knockout phase	2–3	—	0–0	0–1
3	(Portugal) Porto	6	1	2	3	4	11	−7	5	Transfer to Europa League	1–5	1–3	—	1–0
4	(Italy) Milan	6	1	1	4	6	9	−3	4		1–2	1–2	1–1	—

Source: UEFA

===== Group D =====
Pos	Team	Pld	W	D	L	GF	GA	GD	Pts	Qualification	RMA	INT	SHE	SHK
1	(Spain) Real Madrid	6	5	0	1	14	3	+11	15	Advance to knockout phase	—	2–0	1–2	2–1
2	(Italy) Inter Milan	6	3	1	2	8	5	+3	10	Advance to knockout phase	0–1	—	3–1	2–0
3	(Moldova) Sheriff Tiraspol	6	2	1	3	7	11	−4	7	Transfer to Europa League	0–3	1–3	—	2–0
4	(Ukraine) Shakhtar Donetsk	6	0	2	4	2	12	−10	2		0–5	0–0	1–1	—

Source: UEFA

===== Group F =====
Pos	Team	Pld	W	D	L	GF	GA	GD	Pts	Qualification	MUN	VIL	ATA	YB
1	(England) Manchester United	6	3	2	1	11	8	+3	11	Advance to knockout phase	—	2–1	3–2	1–1
2	(Spain) Villarreal	6	3	1	2	12	9	+3	10	Advance to knockout phase	0–2	—	2–2	2–0
3	(Italy) Atalanta	6	1	3	2	12	13	−1	6	Transfer to Europa League	2–2	2–3	—	1–0
4	(Switzerland) Young Boys	6	1	2	3	7	12	−5	5		2–1	1–4	3–3	—

Source: UEFA

===== Group H =====
Pos	Team	Pld	W	D	L	GF	GA	GD	Pts	Qualification	JUV	CHE	ZEN	MAL
1	(Italy) Juventus	6	5	0	1	10	6	+4	15	Advance to knockout phase	—	1–0	4–2	1–0
2	(England) Chelsea	6	4	1	1	13	4	+9	13	Advance to knockout phase	4–0	—	1–0	4–0
3	(Russia) Zenit Saint Petersburg	6	1	2	3	10	10	0	5	Transfer to Europa League	0–1	3–3	—	4–0
4	(Sweden) Malmö FF	6	0	1	5	1	14	−13	1		0–3	0–1	1–1	—

Source: UEFA

==== Knockout phase ====
===== Round of 16 =====
Team 1	Agg.	Team 2	1st leg	2nd leg
Villarreal (Spain)	4–1	(Italy) Juventus	1–1	3–0
Inter Milan (Italy)	1–2	(England) Liverpool	0–2	1–0

=== UEFA Europa League ===
==== Group stage ====
===== Group C =====
Pos	Team	Pld	W	D	L	GF	GA	GD	Pts	Qualification	SPM	NAP	LEI	LEG
1	(Russia) Spartak Moscow	6	3	1	2	10	9	+1	10 (Note: Head–to–head points: Spartak Moscow 6, Napoli 0.)	Advance to round of 16	—	2–1	3–4	0–1
2	(Italy) Napoli	6	3	1	2	15	10	+5	10	Advance to knockout round play-offs	2–3	—	3–2	3–0
3	(England) Leicester City	6	2	2	2	12	11	+1	8	Transfer to Europa Conference League	1–1	2–2	—	3–1
4	(Poland) Legia Warsaw	6	2	0	4	4	11	−7	6		0–1	1–4	1–0	—

Source: UEFA

===== Group E =====
Pos	Team	Pld	W	D	L	GF	GA	GD	Pts	Qualification	GAL	LAZ	MAR	LOK
1	(Turkey) Galatasaray	6	3	3	0	7	3	+4	12	Advance to round of 16	—	1–0	4–2	1–1
2	(Italy) Lazio	6	2	3	1	7	3	+4	9	Advance to knockout round play-offs	0–0	—	0–0	2–0
3	(France) Marseille	6	1	4	1	6	7	−1	7	Transfer to Europa Conference League	0–0	2–2	—	1–0
4	(Russia) Lokomotiv Moscow	6	0	2	4	2	9	−7	2		0–1	0–3	1–1	—

Source: UEFA

==== Knockout stage ====
===== Knockout round play-offs =====
Team 1	Agg.	Team 2	1st leg	2nd leg
Atalanta (Italy)	5–1	(Greece) Olympiacos	2–1	3–0
Barcelona (Spain)	5–3	(Italy) Napoli	1–1	4–2
Porto (Portugal)	4–3	(Italy) Lazio	2–1	2–2

===== Round of 16 =====
Team 1	Agg.	Team 2	1st leg	2nd leg
Atalanta (Italy)	4–2	(Germany) Bayer Leverkusen	3–2	1–0

===== Quarter-finals =====
Team 1	Agg.	Team 2	1st leg	2nd leg
RB Leipzig (Germany)	3–1	(Italy) Atalanta	1–1	0–2

=== UEFA Europa Conference League ===
==== Qualifying phase and play-off round ====
===== Play-off round =====
Team 1	Agg.	Team 2	1st leg	2nd leg
Trabzonspor (Turkey)	1–5	(Italy) Roma	1–2	0–3

==== Group stage ====
===== Group C =====
Pos	Team	Pld	W	D	L	GF	GA	GD	Pts	Qualification	ROM	BOD	ZOR	CSS
1	(Italy) Roma	6	4	1	1	18	11	+7	13	Advance to round of 16	—	2–2	4–0	5–1
2	(Norway) Bodø/Glimt	6	3	3	0	14	5	+9	12	Advance to knockout round play-offs	6–1	—	3–1	2–0
3	(Ukraine) Zorya Luhansk	6	2	1	3	5	11	−6	7		0–3	1–1	—	2–0
4	(Bulgaria) CSKA Sofia	6	0	1	5	3	13	−10	1		2–3	0–0	0–1	—

Source: UEFA

==== Knockout stage ====
===== Round of 16 =====
Team 1	Agg.	Team 2	1st leg	2nd leg
Vitesse (Netherlands)	1–2	(Italy) Roma	0–1	1–1

===== Quarter-finals =====
Team 1	Agg.	Team 2	1st leg	2nd leg
Bodø/Glimt (Norway)	2–5	(Italy) Roma	2–1	0–4

===== Semi-finals =====
Team 1	Agg.	Team 2	1st leg	2nd leg
Leicester City (England)	1–2	(Italy) Roma	1–1	0–1

===== Final =====
25 May 2022
21:00 UTC+2

Roma (Italy)	1–0	(Netherlands) Feyenoord
Zaniolo 32'	Report

Arena Kombëtare, Tirana
Attendance: 19,597
Referee: István Kovács (Romania)

=== UEFA Youth League ===
==== UEFA Champions League Path ====
===== Group B =====
Pos	Team	Pld	W	D	L	GF	GA	GD	Pts	Qualification	LIV	ATM	POR	MIL
1	(England) Liverpool	6	3	2	1	9	4	+5	11	Round of 16	—	2–0	4–0	1–0
2	(Spain) Atlético Madrid	6	3	1	2	9	6	+3	10 (Note: Head-to-head: Atlético Madrid 3 pts (0 GD, 3 GF), Porto 3 pts (0 GD, 3 GF). Goal difference in all group matches: Atlético Madrid +3, Porto –1.)	Play-offs	2–0	—	1–2	3–0
3	(Portugal) Porto	6	3	1	2	8	9	−1	10		1–1	1–2	—	3–1
4	(Italy) Milan	6	0	2	4	3	10	−7	2		1–1	1–1	0–1	—

Source: UEFA

===== Group D =====
Pos	Team	Pld	W	D	L	GF	GA	GD	Pts	Qualification	RMA	INT	SHK	SHE
1	(Spain) Real Madrid	6	4	1	1	11	6	+5	13 (Note: Head-to-head points: Real Madrid 4, Inter Milan 1.)	Round of 16	—	2–1	1–0	4–1
2	(Italy) Inter Milan	6	4	1	1	10	6	+4	13	Play-offs	1–1	—	1–0	2–1
3	(Ukraine) Shakhtar Donetsk	6	3	0	3	14	5	+9	9		3–2	0–1	—	6–0
4	(Moldova) Sheriff Tiraspol	6	0	0	6	4	22	−18	0		0–1	2–4	0–5	—

Source: UEFA

===== Group F =====
Pos	Team	Pld	W	D	L	GF	GA	GD	Pts	Qualification	MUN	VIL	ATA	YB
1	(England) Manchester United	6	5	0	1	12	9	+3	15	Round of 16	—	1–4	4–2	2–1
2	(Spain) Villarreal	6	3	2	1	15	9	+6	11	Play-offs	1–2	—	2–0	3–3
3	(Italy) Atalanta	6	2	1	3	11	12	−1	7		1–2	2–2	—	3–0
4	(Switzerland) Young Boys	6	0	1	5	7	15	−8	1		0–1	1–3	2–3	—

Source: UEFA

===== Group H =====
Pos	Team	Pld	W	D	L	GF	GA	GD	Pts	Qualification	JUV	CHE	ZEN	MAL
1	(Italy) Juventus	6	5	1	0	18	7	+11	16	Round of 16	—	3–1	4–2	4–1
2	(England) Chelsea	6	3	1	2	15	10	+5	10	Play-offs	1–3	—	3–1	4–2
3	(Russia) Zenit Saint Petersburg	6	2	1	3	10	13	−3	7		0–2	1–1	—	3–2
4	(Sweden) Malmö FF	6	0	1	5	8	21	−13	1		2–2	0–5	1–3	—

Source: UEFA

==== Domestic Champions Path ====
===== First round =====
Team 1	Agg.	Team 2	1st leg	2nd leg
Domžale (Slovenia)	2–3	(Italy) Empoli	1–2	1–1

===== Second round =====
Team 1	Agg.	Team 2	1st leg	2nd leg
Red Star Belgrade (Serbia)	1–6	(Italy) Empoli	1–1	0–5

==== Play-offs ====
===== Knockout round play-offs =====
Team 1	Score	Team 2
Empoli (Italy)	3–5	(Germany) Borussia Dortmund
Žilina (Slovakia)	3–1	(Italy) Inter Milan

===== Round of 16 =====
Team 1	Score	Team 2
AZ (Netherlands)	0–0 (4–5 p)	(Italy) Juventus

===== Quarter-finals =====
Team 1	Score	Team 2
Juventus (Italy)	2–0	(England) Liverpool

===== Semi-finals =====
Team 1	Score	Team 2
Juventus (Italy)	2–2 (3–4 p)	(Portugal) Benfica

=== UEFA Women's Champions League ===
==== Qualifying rounds ====
===== Round 1 =====
====== Semi-finals ======
Team 1	Score	Team 2
Juventus (Italy)	12–0	(North Macedonia) Kamenica Sasa
Zürich (Switzerland)	1–2	(Italy) Milan

====== Final ======
Team 1	Score	Team 2
Juventus (Italy)	4–1	(Austria) St. Pölten
1899 Hoffenheim (Germany)	2–0	(Italy) Milan

===== Round 2 =====
Team 1	Agg.	Team 2	1st leg	2nd leg
Vllaznia (Albania)	0–3	(Italy) Juventus	0–2	0–1

==== Group stage ====
===== Group A =====
Pos	Team	Pld	W	D	L	GF	GA	GD	Pts	Qualification	WOL	JUV	CHE	SER
1	(Germany) VfL Wolfsburg	6	3	2	1	17	7	+10	11 (Note: Head-to-head points: Wolfsburg 5, Juventus 5, Chelsea 5. Head-to-head goal differences: Wolfsburg +2, Juventus +1, Chelsea −3.)	Advance to Quarter-finals	—	0–2	4–0	5–0
2	(Italy) Juventus	6	3	2	1	12	4	+8	11	Advance to Quarter-finals	2–2	—	1–2	4–0
3	(England) Chelsea	6	3	2	1	13	8	+5	11		3–3	0–0	—	1–0
4	(Switzerland) Servette Chênois	6	0	0	6	0	23	−23	0		0–3	0–3	0–7	—

Source: UEFA

==== Knockout phase ====
===== Quarter-finals =====
Team 1	Agg.	Team 2	1st leg	2nd leg
Juventus (Italy)	3–4	(France) Lyon	2–1	1–3
