= Nick Koster =

Nick Koster may refer to:

- Nick Köster (1989–2023), South African rugby union player
- Nick Koster (footballer), Dutch footballer
