= Manuel António =

Portuguese footballer

Personal information
- Full name: Manuel António Leitão da Silva
- Date of birth: 29 January 1946 (age 80)
- Place of birth: Santo Tirso, Portugal
- Position: Striker

Youth career
- 1961–1963: Tirsense
- 1963–1964: Académica

Senior career*
Years	Team	Apps	(Gls)
1964–1965	Académica	26	(20)
1965–1968	Porto	44	(30)
1968–1977	Académica	206	(84)
1977–1978	União Leiria		
Total		276	(134)

International career
1969	Portugal	4	(0)
- * Club domestic league appearances and goals

Manuel António Leitão da Silva (born 29 January 1946), known as Manuel António, is a Portuguese retired footballer who played as a striker.

He amassed Primeira Liga totals of 247 matches and 111 goals over 12 seasons, with Académica (two spells) and Porto.

== Club career ==
Manuel António was born in Santo Tirso, Porto District. In a 14-year professional career, he played almost exclusively for two teams; having started out at Académica de Coimbra, his excellent performances earned him a transfer – at only 19 – to FC Porto, where he appeared sparingly over three years (still managing to score regularly).

In 1968, Manuel António returned to Académica, being crowned the Primeira Liga's top scorer in the first season in his second spell, with the Students finishing in sixth place. He all but saw out his career eight years later at the same club, still having a further four campaigns in double digits.

== International career ==
Manuel António won four caps for Portugal in eight months, his debut coming on 6 April 1969 in a 0–0 friendly draw against Mexico.

== Later life ==
After retiring, Manuel António majored in medicine, being in charge of Coimbra's Portuguese Institute of Oncology for several years.
