= AD Fafe =

Portuguese football club

- Full name: Associação Desportiva de Fafe
- Founded: 1958; 68 years ago
- Ground: Estádio Municipal de Fafe; Fafe; Portugal
- Capacity: 4,000
- Chairman: Jorge Fernandes
- Manager: Mário Ferreira
- League: Liga 3
- 2022–23: Liga 3 Serie A, 9th (First stage); Serie 1, 2nd (Relegation Stage)
- Website: adfafe.pt
Home colours	Away colours	Third colours

Associação Desportiva de Fafe (abbreviated as AD Fafe) is a Portuguese professional football club based in Fafe, in the district of Braga.

== Background ==
AD Fafe currently plays in the Campeonato Nacional de Seniores – Série A which is the third tier of Portuguese football. The club was founded in 1958 as a merger of SC Fafe and FC Fafe and they play their home matches at the Estádio Municipal de Fafe which was constructed in 1968. The stadium is able to accommodate 4,000 spectators.

Improved facilities off the pitch were matched by better performances on the pitch and the club successively moved up divisions. Just as the club was celebrating its 30th anniversary, it achieved a first ever first division promotion after finishing runner-up in the second division, in 1987–88.

In the subsequent top flight campaign, Fafe finished 16th and was immediately relegated, but did manage a shock 0–0 draw at F.C. Porto. In 1990–91's second division, the club managed to sign 18-year-old Rui Costa (on loan from S.L. Benfica), who managed 38 games with 6 goals before "returning home".

The next few years were tough because Fafe dropped down two divisions in a couple of years, managing promotion from the fourth level to the third in 1996, where they remained for over a decade. In 2007–08, under manager Carlos Condeço the club finished 11th.

The club is affiliated to Associação de Futebol de Braga and has entered the national cup competition known as Taça de Portugal on many occasions, reaching the semifinals thrice, in 1977, 1979 and 2026.

== Appearances ==
- Tier 1: 1
- II Divisão: 32
- III Divisão: 15
- Taça de Portugal: 41

== Season to season ==
Season	Level	Division	Section	Place	Movements
1990–91	Tier 3	Segunda Divisão	Série Norte	2nd	
1991–92	Tier 3	Segunda Divisão	Série Norte	5th	
1992–93	Tier 3	Segunda Divisão	Série Norte	3rd	
1993–94	Tier 3	Segunda Divisão	Série Norte	11th	
1994–95	Tier 3	Segunda Divisão	Série Norte	16th	Relegated
1995–96	Tier 4	Terceira Divisão	Série A	1st	Promoted
1996–97	Tier 3	Segunda Divisão	Série Norte	14th	Relegated
1997–98	Tier 4	Terceira Divisão	Série A	1st	Promoted
1998–99	Tier 3	Segunda Divisão	Série Norte	3rd	
1999–2000	Tier 3	Segunda Divisão	Série Norte	8th	
2000–01	Tier 3	Segunda Divisão	Série Norte	20th	Relegated
2001–02	Tier 4	Terceira Divisão	Série A	2nd	Promoted
2002–03	Tier 3	Segunda Divisão	Série Norte	11th	
2003–04	Tier 3	Segunda Divisão	Série Norte	12th	
2004–05	Tier 3	Segunda Divisão	Série Norte	9th	
2005–06	Tier 3	Segunda Divisão	Série A	5th	
2006–07	Tier 3	Segunda Divisão	Serie A	6th	
2007–08	Tier 3	Segunda Divisão	Série A – 1ª Fase	11th	
	Tier 3	Segunda Divisão	Série A – Sub-Série A1	3rd	Relegated
2008–09	Tier 4	Terceira Divisão	Série A – 1ª Fase	5th	Promotion Group
	Tier 4	Terceira Divisão	Série A Fase Final	4th	
2009–10	Tier 4	Terceira Divisão	Série B – 1ª Fase	4th	Promotion Group
	Tier 4	Terceira Divisão	Série B Fase Final	2nd	Promoted
2010–11	Tier 3	Segunda Divisão	Série Norte	4th	
2011–12	Tier 3	Segunda Divisão	Série Norte	2nd	

== Point total history ==
Divisions/Leagues	Pl.	W	T	L	GS	GL	Pts.
1.ª Liga / Divisão	38	9	14	15	29	47	32
2.ª Liga / Honra	0	0	0	0	0	0	0
2.ª Divisão	114	435	329	350	?	?	1301
3.ª Divisão	318	152	89	63	?	?	460

== Honours ==
- Terceira Divisão
  - Champions (1): 1995–96

== Current squad ==
As of 19 September 2026

Note: Flags indicate national team as defined under FIFA eligibility rules; some limited exceptions apply. Players may hold more than one non-FIFA nationality.

No.	Pos.	Nation	Player
1	GK	RUS	Petr Kudakovskiy
2	DF	POR	Obama Ribeiro
3	DF	POR	Pedro Pereira
4	DF	POR	Leandro Teixeira
6	DF	POR	Nuno Sequeira
7	FW	BRA	Rafael Martins
8	MF	GBS	Mimito Biai
9	FW	POR	Mário Correia
10	MF	POR	Daniel Carvalho
11	FW	ANG	Picas
13	FW	POR	Tiago Veiga
15	DF	POR	Breno

No.	Pos.	Nation	Player
16	MF	POR	Dinis Gama
18	FW	POR	Dinis Gama
20	MF	POR	Duarte Carvalho
23	GK	POR	Léo Ferreira
26	DF	POR	João Batista
28	DF	POR	Benny
35	MF	POR	Filipe Cardoso
77	FW	BRA	Carlos Daniel
88	DF	GHA	Kuffour Asamoah
90	MF	COD	Prince Otumba (on loan from Chaves)
99	GK	POR	Guilherme Carneiro

=== Out on loan ===
Note: Flags indicate national team as defined under FIFA eligibility rules; some limited exceptions apply. Players may hold more than one non-FIFA nationality.

No.	Pos.	Nation	Player
—	FW	NGR	Elijah Alao (at Vila Meã until 30 June 2027)

== Notable players ==
- (Portugal) Rui Costa

== Chairmen ==
Year(s)	Chairman
1958	Rogério Rodrigues de Brito
1959–1960	Dr. Amadeu João Plácido da Silva e Castro
1960–1961	Albino Pereira Fernandes
1962–1967	Dr. António Marques Mendes
1967–1968	Ângelo Salgado Medon
1968–1970	Dr. António Marques Mendes
1970	Eng. Mário Samuel Hercílio Valente
1971	Dr. José Manuel Ribeiro Cardoso
1972–1974	Damião Monteiro
1974–1976	Eng. Mário Samuel Hercílio Valente
1976–1982	Moisés Teixeira
1982–1984	Eng. Mário Samuel Hercílio Valente
1984–1986	José de Barros
1986–1992	João Carlos Costa Freitas
1992	Comissão Administrativa
1992–1994	António Augusto Oliveira Nogueira
1994	Doutor Armindo Magalhães
1994	Comissão Administrativa
1995–1998	Álvaro Moreira Mendes
1998–2002	António Lopes Silva
2002–2003	Dr. Carlos Alberto Martins Gonçalves
2003–2004	Comissão de Gestão
2005–2013 (14 junho)	Albino Salgado Pereira
2013 (14 junho)–?	Jorge Fernandes (Comissão de Gestão)
2015–2019	Jorge Fernandes
