= Augusto Rocha =

Portuguese footballer (born 1935)

Personal information
- Full name: Augusto Francisco Rocha
- Date of birth: 7 February 1935 (age 91)
- Place of birth: Macau
- Position: Forward

Senior career*
Years	Team	Apps	(Gls)
1953–1955	Sporting de Macau		
1955–1956	Sporting CP		
1956–1971	Académica		

International career
1958–1963	Portugal	7	(0)
- * Club domestic league appearances and goals

Augusto Francisco Rocha (born 7 February 1935 in Macau) is a former Portuguese footballer who played as a forward.

== Football career ==
Rocha gained 7 caps for Portugal and made his debut 13 April 1958 in Madrid against Spain, in a 0-1 defeat.
