= Bentes =

Portuguese footballer

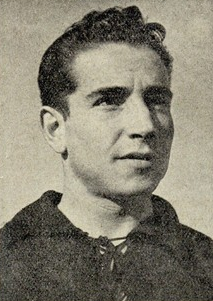

Personal information
- Full name: António de Deus da Costa Matos Bentes de Oliveira
- Date of birth: 29 August 1927
- Place of birth: São João do Souto (Portugal)
- Date of death: 6 February 2003 (aged 75)
- Place of death: Portalegre, Portugal
- Height: 1.67 m (5 ft 6 in)
- Position: Forward

Senior career*
Years	Team	Apps	(Gls)
1945–1960	Académica		

International career
1946–1954	Portugal	3	(0)
- * Club domestic league appearances and goals

António de Deus da Costa Matos Bentes de Oliveira (29 August 1927 – 6 February 2003) known as Bentes, was a Portuguese footballer who played as forward.
