= Lucas Tagliapietra =

Brazilian footballer

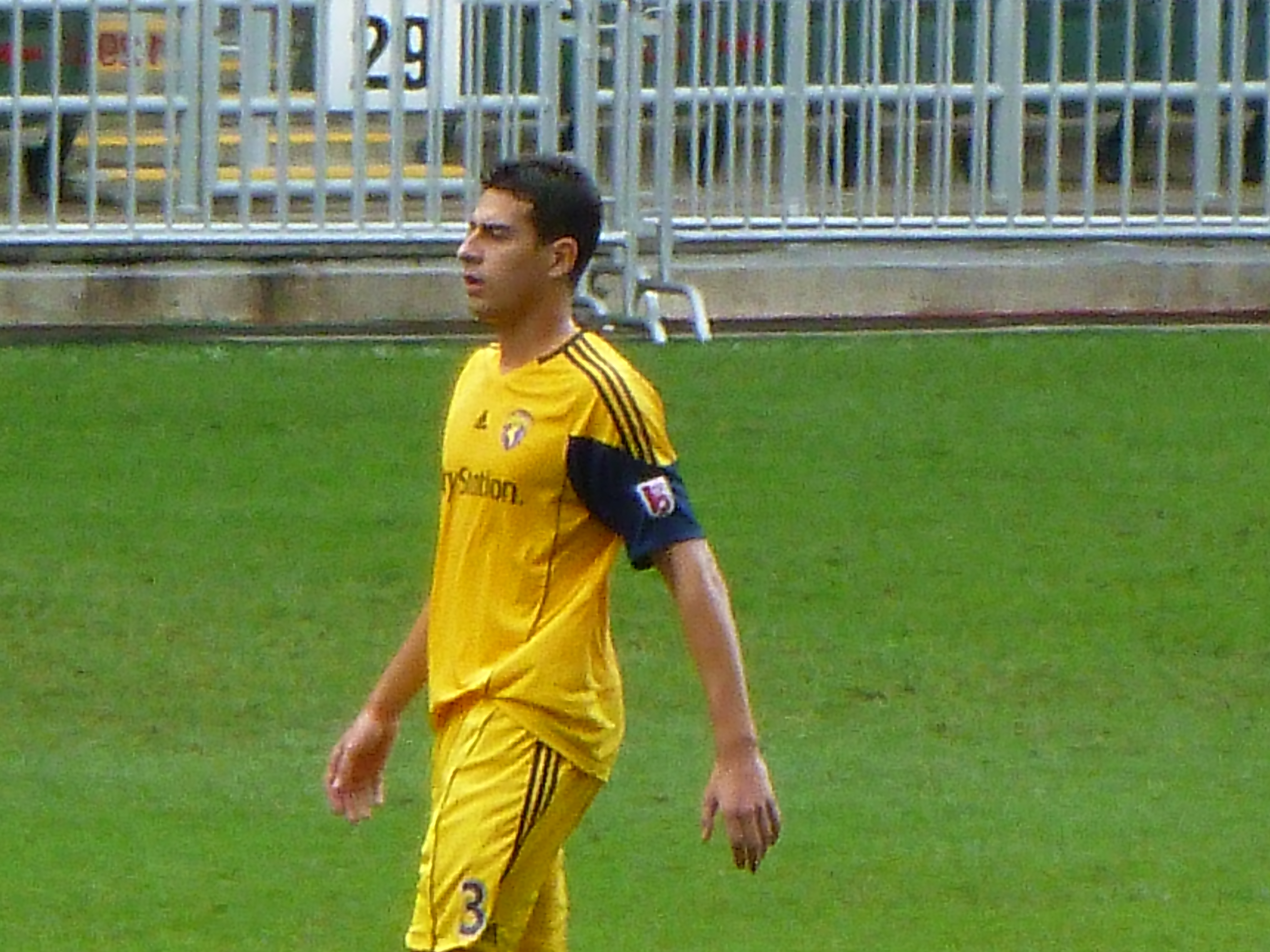
- Lucas playing for TSW Pegasus in 2012

Personal information
- Full name: Lucas de Lima Tagliapietra
- Date of birth: 5 November 1990 (age 36)
- Place of birth: Alegrete, Brazil
- Height: 1.94 m (6 ft 4 in)
- Position: Centre-back

Team information
- Current team: São Vicente Irivo

Youth career
- Juventude

Senior career*
Years	Team	Apps	(Gls)
2010–2011	Santa Cruz-RS	2	(0)
2011–2012	TSW Pegasus	13	(0)
2012–2013	Dacia Chișinău	15	(0)
2013–2015	Milsami	12	(1)
2015–2016	Hamilton Academical	40	(4)
2016–2017	Boavista	31	(3)
2017	LDU Quito	19	(2)
2018–2019	Al-Batin	26	(0)
2019–2020	Boavista	12	(2)
2020–2021	Portimonense	5	(0)
2021–2023	Penafiel	41	(3)
2025–	São Vicente Irivo	0	(0)
- * Club domestic league appearances and goals as of 00:18, 25 December 2025 (UTC)

Lucas de Lima Tagliapietra (born 5 November 1990), known simply as Lucas, is a Brazilian professional footballer who plays as a centre-back for Portuguese club São Vicente Irivo.

== Career ==
Born in Alegrete, Rio Grande do Sul, Lucas began his career in the state with Santa Cruz in 2010. He then played for TSW Pegasus FC, where he was twice Hong Kong league runner-up, and once a domestic cup finalist. After that he moved to Moldova's FC Dacia Chișinău, and in 2013 transferred to another team in their league, FC Milsami. He left the club when they were in fifth position.

Lucas signed for Scottish club Hamilton Academical on a one-year contract on 30 January 2015. He made his debut in the Scottish Premiership on 22 February, replacing Martin Canning for the last seven minutes of a 4–0 defeat away to league leaders Celtic. On 16 May he scored his first goal for the club, heading in Ali Crawford's corner to open an eventual 2–1 loss away to Ross County. After breaking into the first-team he extended his contract with the club in May 2015, until the end of the 2015–16 season.

Lucas left The Accies in July 2016, and signed a contract with Boavista F.C. as a free agent. He scored his first goal for the club in the first day of the season, in a 2–0 home win against Arouca on 14 August. On 18 September, his errors led to both goals in a 2–1 loss to Feirense also at the Estádio do Bessa; the latter was a handball that denied a goal for Platiny and earned a red card. Manager Erwin Sánchez said that the blame for the defeat was shared across the whole team, not just Lucas.

In June 2017, Lucas returned to South America when he signed a four-year deal at LDU Quito in Ecuador, who purchased 50% of his economic rights.

After a year at Al Batin FC in the Saudi Professional League, Lucas returned to Boavista on a two-year deal in July 2019. He left again after one season and signed a contract of the same length for Portimonense in September 2020.

On 27 July 2021, Lucas signed a two-year deal with Liga Portugal 2 side Penafiel. At the end of the 2022–23 season, his contract expired and he left the club.

In August 2025, after two years as a free agent, Lucas joined Penafiel-based side São Vicente de Irivo, competing in AF Porto's Divisão de Honra, equivalent to Portugal's 7th tier.

== Personal life ==
Lucas also has an Italian passport, allowing him to play in the United Kingdom without a work permit.
