= Gonçalo Loureiro =

Portuguese footballer

Personal information
- Full name: Gonçalo João Fernandes Loureiro
- Date of birth: 1 February 2000 (age 26)
- Place of birth: Guimarães, Portugal
- Height: 1.86 m (6 ft 1 in)
- Position: Centre-back

Team information
- Current team: Oliveirense
- Number: 24

Youth career
- 2009–2014: Vitória Guimarães
- 2014–2021: Benfica

Senior career*
Years	Team	Apps	(Gls)
2021	Benfica B	1	(0)
2021–2023	Penafiel	30	(0)
2024–2025	Académica de Coimbra	3	(1)
2025–2026	Sp. Covilhã	11	(0)
2026	Spartakos Kitiou	12	(0)
2026–	Oliveirense	3	(0)

International career^{‡}
2015	Portugal U15	1	(0)
2016	Portugal U16	4	(1)
2016	Portugal U17	5	(0)
2018	Portugal U18	7	(0)
2018–2019	Portugal U19	17	(0)
2019	Portugal U20	2	(0)
- * Club domestic league appearances and goals as of 12 September 2026 ‡ National team caps and goals as of 16:14, 10 August 2021 (UTC)

Gonçalo João Fernandes Loureiro (born 1 February 2000) is a Portuguese professional footballer who plays as a centre-back for Liga 3 club Oliveirense.

== International career ==
Loureiro has represented Portugal at youth international level.

== Career statistics ==
=== Club ===
As of 10 August 2021

Appearances and goals by club, season and competition
Club	Season	League			National cup		League cup		Other		Total	
Club	Season	Division	Apps	Goals	Apps	Goals	Apps	Goals	Apps	Goals	Apps	Goals
Benfica B	2020–21	Liga Portugal 2	1	0	–		–		0	0	1	0
Benfica B	2021–22	Liga Portugal 2	0	0	–		–		0	0	0	0
Career total			1	0	0	0	0	0	0	0	1	0
