= Leandro Teixeira =

Portuguese footballer

Personal information
- Full name: Leandro Marcelo de Sousa Teixeira
- Date of birth: 26 April 1998 (age 28)
- Place of birth: Penafiel, Portugal
- Height: 1.86 m (6 ft 1 in)
- Position: Centre-back

Team information
- Current team: Fafe
- Number: 4

Youth career
- 2013–2014: Cabeça Santa
- 2014–2017: Penafiel

Senior career*
Years	Team	Apps	(Gls)
2017–2018	Penafiel B	23	(0)
2018−2024	Penafiel	75	(3)
2024–	Fafe	56	(2)
- * Club domestic league appearances and goals as of 7 May 2026

Leandro Marcelo de Sousa Teixeira (born 26 April 1998) is a Portuguese professional footballer who plays as a centre-back for Liga 3 club Fafe.

== Football career ==
On 23 February 2019, Teixeira made his professional debut with Penafiel in a 2018–19 LigaPro match against Sporting Covilhã.
