= Hristijan Georgievski =

Macedonian footballer

Personal information
- Date of birth: 12 April 2003 (age 23)
- Place of birth: Skopje, Macedonia
- Height: 1.88 m (6 ft 2 in)
- Position: Midfielder

Team information
- Current team: Struga
- Number: 26

Youth career
- 2014–2021: Rabotnički
- 2021: MTK Budapest

Senior career*
Years	Team	Apps	(Gls)
2021–2022	MTK Budapest II	23	(0)
2022–2023	Skopje	10	(0)
2023	Sileks	5	(0)
2023–	Struga	6	(0)

International career^{‡}
2018	North Macedonia U15	1	(0)
2021	North Macedonia U20	2	(0)
- * Club domestic league appearances and goals as of 22:02, 10 October 2023 (UTC) ‡ National team caps and goals as of 22:02, 10 October 2023 (UTC)

Hristijan Georgievski (Macedonian: Христијан Георгиевски; born 12 April 2003) is a Macedonian professional footballer who plays as a midfielder for Macedonian First Football League club Struga.

== Club career ==
=== MTK Budapest ===
On 19 January 2021, MTK Budapest announced the signing from Rabotnički youth team. He played for both MTK U19 and MTK Budapest II. He played in the UEFA Youth League with MTK U19, scoring 1 goal in 4 games.

== International career ==
He played one match in North Macedonia U15 team against Croatia U15 and two matches in North Macedonia U20 against Kosovo U19.
