= Danila Knyazev =

Russian footballer

Personal information
- Full name: Danila Sergeyevich Knyazev
- Date of birth: 18 June 2003 (age 23)
- Place of birth: Moscow, Russia
- Height: 1.73 m (5 ft 8 in)
- Position: Midfielder

Team information
- Current team: Avangard Kursk
- Number: 31

Youth career
- –2019: Rotor Volgograd
- 2019–2021: FShM Moscow

Senior career*
Years	Team	Apps	(Gls)
2021	SKA Rostov-on-Don	10	(0)
2021	Minsk	4	(0)
2022–2024	Orenburg-2	55	(5)
2023–2024	Orenburg	0	(0)
2024–2025	Avangard Kursk	31	(2)
2025–2026	Murom	7	(0)
2026–	Avangard Kursk	27	(6)
- * Club domestic league appearances and goals as of 31 October 2026

Danila Sergeyevich Knyazev (Russian: Данила Сергеевич Князев; born 18 June 2003) is a Russian professional footballer who plays as a midfielder for Russian Second League club Avangard Kursk.

== Career ==
Knyazev made his debut for the main squad of Orenburg on 2 November 2023 in a Russian Cup game against CSKA Moscow.

On 4 July 2024, Knyazev moved to Avangard Kursk.

== Career statistics ==
As of 22 June 2024

Club	Season	League			Cup		Continental		Total	
Club	Season	Division	Apps	Goals	Apps	Goals	Apps	Goals	Apps	Goals
SKA Rostov-on-Don	2020–21	Russian Second League	10	0	–		–		10	0
Minsk	2021	Belarusian Premier League	4	0	–		–		4	0
Orenburg-2	2021–22	Russian Second League	9	0	–		–		9	0
Orenburg-2	2022–23	Russian Second League	21	3	–		–		21	3
Orenburg-2	2023	Russian Second League B	14	0	–		–		14	0
Orenburg-2	2024	Russian Second League B	11	2	–		–		11	2
Orenburg-2	Total		55	5	0	0	0	0	55	5
Orenburg	2023–24	Russian Premier League	0	0	1	0	–		1	0
Career total			69	5	1	0	0	0	70	5
