= Pontus Texel =

Danish association footballer (born 2004)

Personal information
- Full name: Pontus Andy Texel
- Date of birth: 27 February 2004 (age 22)
- Place of birth: Herlev, Denmark
- Height: 1.82 m (6 ft 0 in)
- Positions: Right-back; centre-back

Team information
- Current team: Académica de Coimbra (on loan from Mafra)
- Number: 44

Youth career
- Nordsjælland
- 2019–2023: Midtjylland

Senior career*
Years	Team	Apps	(Gls)
2022–2023	Midtjylland	1	(0)
2023–	Mafra	37	(1)
2025–2026	→ Kolding (loan)	19	(2)
2026–	→ Académica de Coimbra (loan)	3	(1)

International career^{‡}
2019–2020	Denmark U-16	10	(0)
2020	Denmark U-17	1	(0)
2021–2022	Denmark U-18	7	(0)
2022–2023	Denmark U-19	9	(0)
2023–2025	Denmark U-20	10	(0)
2024	Denmark U-21	1	(0)
- * Club domestic league appearances and goals as of 11 September 2026 ‡ National team caps and goals as of 23:26, 18 January 2025 (UTC)

Pontus Andy Texel (born 27 February 2004) is a Danish professional footballer who plays as a right-back for Liga Portugal 2 club Académica de Coimbra on loan from Mafra.

== Club career ==
=== FC Midtjylland ===
In the summer of 2019, Texel joined FC Midtjylland's academy as an U17 player. Before the move, Texel played for FC Nordsjælland. Already as a 16-year-old, Texel got his first match for Midtjylland's U-19 team, and he was promoted to the squad halfway through 2021, despite being a U-17 player. In 2021–22, Texel became an important part of the U-19 team and was also captain.

His good performances at U-19 level were rewarded in June 2022 with a professional contract until June 2027, which Texel signed. From there, things went quickly: on 13 October 2022 he was on the bench for the first team in the UEFA Europa League match against Feyenoord, and on 19 October 2022 he made his official debut in the Danish Cup against FA 2000.

After that, he was called up for the first team squad a few times, but he had to wait until 3 June 2023 before he got his chance again: here, he made his Danish Superliga debut against Odense Boldklub, replacing Mads Døhr Thychosen for the last 23 minutes.

=== CD Mafra ===
On 18 July 2023 Texel, along with two other teammates, moved to Liga Portugal 2 club C.D. Mafra. Texel made his debut for the club in a league match on 19 August 2023 against F.C. Paços de Ferreira.

On 10 July 2024 Mafra confirmed that Texel had signed a new contract until 2029.

On transfer deadline day, 1 September 2025, Texel transferred to the Danish 1st Division club Kolding IF on a loan deal until the end of the season.
