= Oliveira Duarte =

Portuguese footballer

Personal information
- Full name: Joaquim António Oliveira Duarte
- Date of birth: 19 March 1943 (age 83)
- Place of birth: Portugal
- Position: Defender

Senior career*
| Years | Team | Apps | (Gls) |
| 1964–1969 | Sporting CP | | |

International career
| 1966 | Portugal | 1 | (0) |
- * Club domestic league appearances and goals

Joaquim António Oliveira Duarte (born 19 March 1943) is a former Portuguese footballer who played as defender.

== Football career ==
Oliveira Duarte gained 1 cap for Portugal against Sweden in Lisbon 13 November 1966, in a 1-2 defeat.
