= Filipe Cardoso (footballer) =

Portuguese footballer (born 1994)

Personal information
- Full name: Filipe Couto Cardoso
- Date of birth: 2 June 1994 (age 32)
- Place of birth: Canidelo, Portugal
- Height: 1.90 m (6 ft 3 in)
- Position: Defensive midfielder

Team information
- Current team: Fafe
- Number: 35

Youth career
- 2003–2008: Coimbrões
- 2008–2009: Boavista
- 2009–2010: Pasteleira
- 2010–2012: Boavista
- 2012–2013: Coimbrões

Senior career*
Years	Team	Apps	(Gls)
2013–2019	Coimbrões	158	(21)
2019–2021	Sporting Covilhã	45	(3)
2021–2022	Marítimo	1	(0)
2021–2022	Marítimo B	11	(1)
2022	→ Académico de Viseu (loan)	11	(0)
2022–2024	Penafiel	57	(0)
2024–	Fafe	54	(2)
- * Club domestic league appearances and goals as of 7 May 2026

Filipe Couto Cardoso (born 2 June 1994) is a Portuguese professional footballer who plays for Fafe as a midfielder.

== Football career ==
Born in Canidelo, Vila Nova de Gaia in the Porto Metropolitan Area, Cardoso spent most of his youth with local S.C. Coimbrões, while also having some time in the ranks of Boavista F.C. where he played in midfield with Bruno Fernandes. He played six senior seasons for Coimbrões, all in the third tier.

On 19 May 2019, Cardoso made his leap to the professional game, signing a one-year deal with S.C. Covilhã of the LigaPro. He made his debut in the Taça da Liga first round on 28 July in a game against Varzim SC, playing the full game as his team won on penalties after a goalless draw.

On 24 June 2021, Filipe Cardoso signed a three years contract with Marítimo

== Personal life ==
Cardoso graduated in medicine from the University of Porto in 2019, having played for Coimbrões during his studies.
