= Académica de Coimbra (football) =

Association football club in Coimbra, Portugal

- Full name: Associação Académica de Coimbra – Organismo; Autónomo de Futebol
- Nickname: Briosa
- Founded: 3 November 1887; 139 years ago
- Ground: Estádio Cidade de Coimbra
- Capacity: 29,622
- Owner: University of Coimbra
- Chairman: Pedro Miguel Ribeiro
- Manager: António Barbosa
- League: Liga Portugal 2
- 2025–26: Liga 3, First stage Série B, 3rd of 10; Promotion stage, 2nd of 8 (promoted)
- Website: www.academica-oaf.pt
Home colours	Away colours

The Associação Académica de Coimbra – Organismo Autónomo de Futebol (AAC-OAF), also referred to as Académica de Coimbra (Portuguese pronunciation: [ɐkɐˈðɛmikɐ ðɨ kuˈĩbɾɐ]) or simply Académica, is a professional football club based in Coimbra, Portugal.

As of the 2023–24 football season in Portugal, the club competes in the third division of the Portuguese football league system, and hosts home games at the Estádio Cidade de Coimbra which is owned by the local municipal government. Académica also played at the Estádio Sérgio Conceição at the start of the 2023–24 season.

It also has a futsal department with men's and women's teams. The club's name derives from the footballing division of the Associação Académica de Coimbra, officially known as the Associação Académica de Coimbra - Secção de Futebol (AAC-SF), which fields its own amateur football teams as a second incarnation starting in 1977 and belongs to the student association of the University of Coimbra like the professional AAC-OAF which is however an autonomous organization inside the student association and owns the entire heritage and historical records formerly belonging to AAC-SF until 1974.

Despite being founded in 1887 as a student organisation, following the merger of Clube Atlético de Coimbra (founded in 1861) and Academia Dramática (founded in 1837), the football section of the Associação Académica de Coimbra was only established in 1911, making it one of the oldest active clubs in Portugal and the Iberian Peninsula. The club have won the Taça de Portugal twice, in 1938–39 and 2011–12. In 1966–67, they achieved their highest position of runner-up in the Primeira Liga table.

== History ==
Evolution of Associação Académica de Coimbra – OAF's league performances since 1938

The Associação Académica de Coimbra - Organismo Autónomo de Futebol, hereinafter AAC-OAF, which dates back to 3 November 1887, the date of creation of the Associação Académica de Coimbra (AAC) which is the student association of the University of Coimbra, is the legal and legitimate successor of the extinct Section of Football of the Association Académica de Coimbra (Associação Académica de Coimbra - Secção de Futebol (AAC-SF)) that, by resolution of 10 June 1974 of the General Assembly of Members of AAC after the events of the Carnation Revolution, was transformed into Clube Académico de Coimbra (CAC). The current name, AAC-OAF, was adopted on the joint initiative of the General Board of Academica de Coimbra (Direcção-Geral da Associação Académica de Coimbra (DG-AAC)) and the Board of the Academic Club of Coimbra (Clube Académico de Coimbra (CAC)), and it was approved by the General Board of Associação Académica de Coimbra (DG-AAC) and by the General Assembly of CAC in 1984. By these statutes, a legally-binding link to the student association AAC and its university, the University of Coimbra (UC), was preserved in favour of AAC-OAF. The Associação Académica de Coimbra - Secção de Futebol (AAC-SF) amateur football team, which also belongs to the Associação Académica de Coimbra students association (students union) of the University of Coimbra, was reinstated in 1977 operating as a sports section of AAC and has been in operation as a student-only football team, usually playing in the lower, regional non-professional football leagues. The AAC-SF section, the non-professional football team made of students, and the AAC-OAF, the professional and autonomous football club, share the same crest and colors displayed on the clothes or uniforms of their sports players, as well as the same parent organization (which is the students' union or association Associação Académica de Coimbra that houses several sections for a multitude of other sports operating under the same name and crest as well).

Académica de Coimbra won the 1938–39 Taça de Portugal, the inaugural staging of the competition; they defeated S.L. Benfica 4–3 in the final. In 1966–67, the club finished as Primeira Liga runners-up to Benfica (best-ever finish), and lost the cup final 3–2 after extra time to Vitória de Setúbal. Two years later, a cup-final defeat to Benfica meant that the team competed in Europe for the first time, entering the 1969–70 Cup Winners' Cup and losing in the quarter-finals to eventual champions Manchester City via a single extra-time goal.

Académica de Coimbra moved frequently between the top two divisions in the years that followed. Under João Alves, they ended a three-year exile by winning promotion in 2001–02 as runners-up to Moreirense FC. Following a decade of almost exclusively bottom-half finishes, the team won its first silverware in 73 years when they took the cup in 2012, Marinho scoring the only goal after four minutes against Sporting CP. This allowed them entry into the group stage of the UEFA Europa League – a first European campaign in 30 years. Eliminated in third place in the group, they managed one win, 2–0 at home to holders Atlético Madrid with a brace from Wilson Eduardo.

A 14-year spell in the top division ended for Académica de Coimbra in 2015–16, when they finished in last place.

On 4 November 2017, in honour of their 130th birthday, they joined the Club of Pioneers, a worldwide network of the oldest continuing football clubs from each country in the world, originally founded by Sheffield FC.

After the 2021-22 Liga Portugal 2 season, the club was relegated for the first time to the third tier of the Portuguese football pyramid.

The Associação Académica de Coimbra - Organismo Autónomo de Futebol filed for insolvency in September 2022. The club had overdue debts of more than 5.6 million euros, of which 1.9 million euros to the state, and had 3.1 million euros in defaults with suppliers and service providers. By June 2023, an intricate creative accounting process had been initiated by Académica de Coimbra O.A.F.'s administration board to allow its emergence from bankruptcy avoiding the extinction of the football club.

== Grounds ==
The home ground it uses is the Estádio Cidade de Coimbra which has a capacity of 29,622 and belongs to the municipality's local government authority.

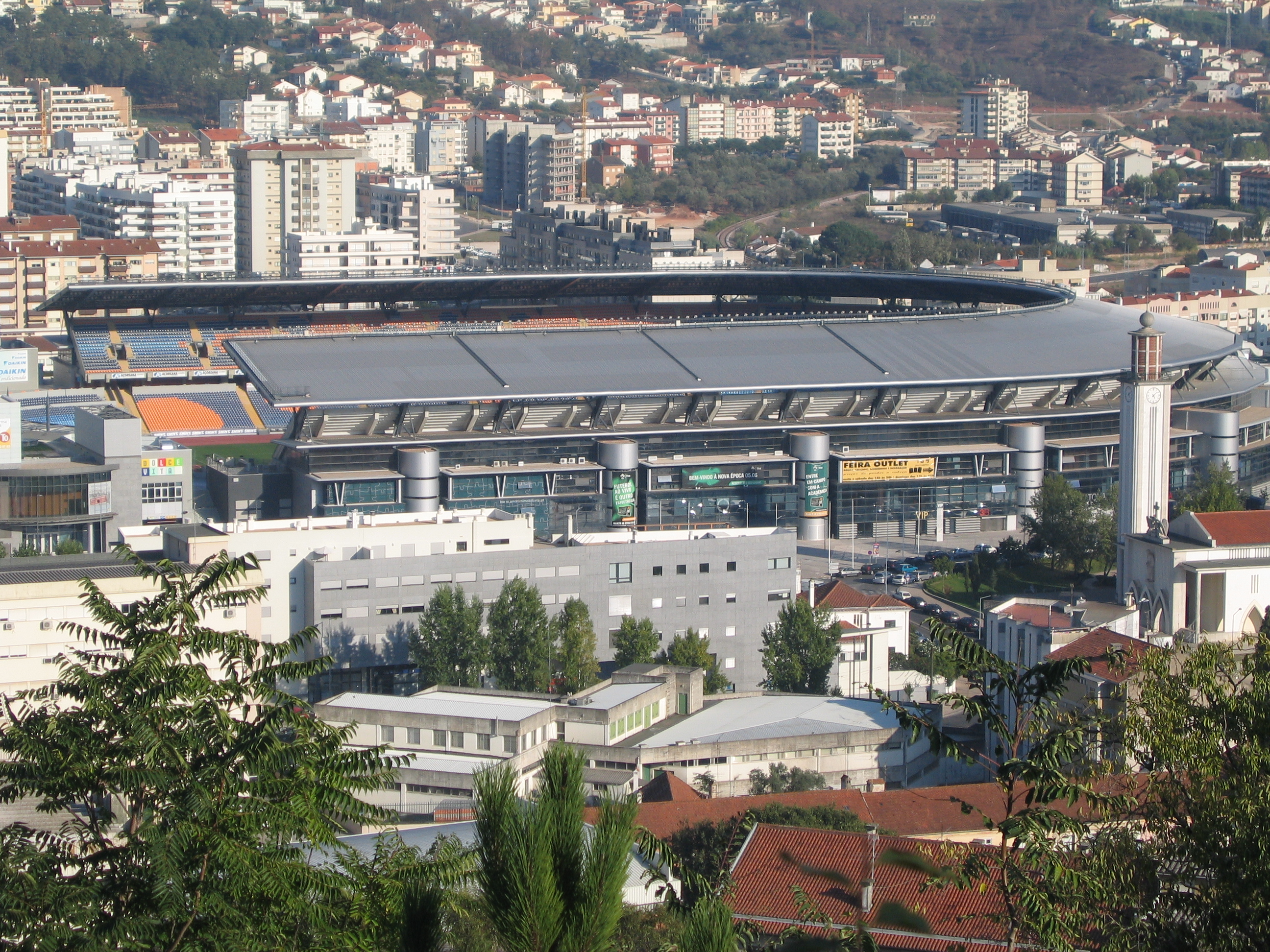
A side view of the Estádio Cidade de Coimbra

== Honours ==
- I Liga/I Divisão
  - Runners-up (1): 1966–67
- Taça de Portugal
  - Winners: 1938–39, 2011–12
  - Runners-up (3): 1950–51, 1966–67, 1968–69
- Supertaça Cândido de Oliveira
  - Runners-up (1): 2012
- Campeonato de Portugal
  - Runners-up (1): 1922–23
- II Divisão
  - Winners: 1948–49, 1972–73

== League and cup history ==
Season		Pos.	Pl.	W	D	L	GS	GA	P	Cup	League Cup	Europe		Other competitions		Top-scorer(s) (Note: Only goals scored in the regional championship or Primeira Liga are considered.)
1934–35	CL	8	14	1	1	12	14	49	3	Last 16	—	—	—	—	—	Rui Cunha (5)
1935–36	CL	8	14	1	1	12	13	51	3	Last 16	—	—	—	—	—	Rui Cunha (6)
1936–37	CL	5	14	5	1	8	24	30	11	Last 16	—	—	—	—	—	Alberto Gomes (6)
1937–38	CL	6	14	5	0	9	23	37	10	Quarter-finals	—	—	—	—	—	Mário Cunha (6)
1938–39	1D	5	14	4	3	7	27	39	11	Winner	—	—	—	—	—	Arnaldo Carneiro (14)
1939–40	1D	6	18	7	3	8	42	54	17	Last 16	—	—	—	—	—	Alberto Gomes (8)
1940–41	1D	5	14	4	3	7	32	41	11	Quarter-finals	—	—	—	—	—	Peseta (9)
1941–42	1D	5	22	13	0	9	77	51	26	Last 16	—	—	—	—	—	Nini Conceição (9)
1942–43	1D	6	18	6	2	10	54	60	14	Last 16	—	—	—	—	—	Alberto Gomes (9)
1943–44	1D	9	18	3	0	15	35	68	6	Semi-finals	—	—	—	—	—	Alberto Gomes (6)
1944–45	1D	9	18	4	1	13	33	65	9	Last 16	—	—	—	—	—	Nini Conceição (4)
1945–46	1D	10	22	7	2	13	51	76	16	Last 16	—	—	—	—	—	Bentes (13)
1946–47	1D	11	26	8	4	14	49	96	20	not held	—	—	—	—	—	Bentes (16)
1947–48	1D	14	26	4	2	20	25	113	10	Last 16	—	—	—	—	—	Bentes (11)
1948–49	2D	1	14	10	0	4	46	14	20	Last 16	—	—	—	—	—	Bentes (?)
1949–50	1D	7	26	8	8	10	56	57	24	not held	—	—	—	—	—	Macedo (21)
1950–51	1D	8	26	10	4	12	40	53	24	Final	—	—	—	—	—	Macedo (10)
1951–52	1D	7	26	8	6	12	39	47	22	Last 16	—	—	—	—	—	Bentes (14)
1952–53	1D	11	26	7	5	14	39	57	19	Last 16	—	—	—	—	—	Bentes (14)
1953–54	1D	13	26	8	2	16	29	50	18	Last 16	—	—	—	—	—	Francisco André (11)
1954–55	1D	6	26	10	5	11	53	52	25	Semi-finals	—	—	—	—	—	Francisco André (15)
1955–56	1D	13	26	8	3	15	36	52	19	Last 16	—	—	—	—	—	Faia (15)
1956–57	1D	6	26	12	4	10	45	33	28	Quarter-finals	—	—	—	—	—	Francisco André (16)
1957–58	1D	9	26	10	4	12	45	40	24	Quarter-finals	—	—	—	—	—	Francisco André (17)
1958–59	1D	10	26	8	5	13	45	46	21	Last 16	—	—	—	—	—	Chipenda (11)
1959–60	1D	6	26	8	9	9	40	41	25	Last 64	—	—	—	—	—	Miranda (9)
1960–61	1D	7	26	10	6	10	31	29	26	Last 64	—	—	—	—	—	Jorge Humberto (10)
1961–62	1D	10	26	9	4	13	44	54	22	Last 16	—	—	—	—	—	Gaio (21)
1962–63	1D	10	26	8	3	15	49	50	19	Last 16	—	—	—	—	—	João Lourenço (24)
1963–64	1D	9	26	11	3	12	43	48	25	Last 32	—	—	—	—	—	Oliveira Duarte (9)
1964–65	1D	4	26	16	2	8	58	40	34	Last 32	—	—	—	—	—	Manuel António (20)
1965–66	1D	6	26	9	8	9	58	48	26	Last 64	—	—	—	—	—	Ernesto (17)
1966–67	1D	2	26	18	4	4	50	18	40	Final	—	—	—	—	—	Artur Jorge (25)
1967–68	1D	4	26	15	5	6	53	24	35	Last 16	—	—	—	—	—	Artur Jorge (28)
1968–69	1D	6	26	12	6	8	48	32	30	Final	—	FC	1st round	—	—	Manuel António (19)
1969–70	1D	10	26	8	6	12	42	46	22	Last 16	—	CWC	Quarter-finals	—	—	Nene (11)
1970–71	1D	5	26	13	7	6	38	24	33	Last 32	—	—	—	—	—	Manuel António (9)
1971–72	1D	15	30	7	7	16	29	38	21	Last 32	—	UC	1st round	—	—	Manuel António (12)
1972–73	2D	1	30	22	5	3	66	14	49	Last 16	—	—	—	—	—	Manuel António (23)
1973–74	1D	10	30	8	7	15	29	45	23	5th round	—	—	—	—	—	Vala (9)
1974–75	1D	14	30	7	6	17	33	47	20	5th round	—	—	—	—	—	Manecas (7)
1975–76	1D	11	30	7	9	14	32	47	23	5th round	—	—	—	—	—	Vala (8)
1976–77	1D	5	30	14	6	10	29	25	34	Last 64	—	—	—	—	—	Joaquim Rocha (13)
1977–78	1D	8	30	11	4	15	41	49	26	Last 128	—	—	—	—	—	Joaquim Rocha (15)
1978–79	1D	15	30	5	8	17	20	41	18	Quarter-finals	—	—	—	—	—	Gregório Freixo (4)
1979–80	2D	1	30	19	9	2	57	13	47	Last 32	—	—	—	—	—	Eldon (16)
1980–81	1D	16	30	4	6	20	16	58	14	last 32	—	—	—	—	—	Eldon (8)
1981–82	2D	2	30	18	10	2	59	13	46	Last 128	—	—	—	—	—	Eldon (21)
1982–83	2D	2	30	21	6	3	74	32	48	Semi-finals	—	—	—	—	—	Eldon (42)
1983–84	2D	1	30	19	7	4	58	22	45	Last 128	—	—	—	—	—	Camegim (12)
1984–85	1D	7	30	12	5	13	45	47	29	Last 16	—	—	—	—	—	Pedro Xavier (13)
1985–86	1D	10	30	9	7	14	28	38	25	Quarter-finals	—	—	—	—	—	Pedro Xavier (9)
1986–87	1D	10	30	7	12	11	22	34	26	Last 128	—	—	—	—	—	Reinaldo Silva (5)
1987–88	1D	16	38	9	15	14	32	42	33	3rd round	—	—	—	—	—	Quinito (6)
1988–89	2D	2	34	21	10	3	66	23	52	Last 32	—	—	—	—	—	Rúbens Feijão (22)
1989–90	2D	4	34	19	5	10	55	34	43	1st round	—	—	—	—	—	Eldon (11)
1990–91	2H	6	38	17	10	11	41	32	44	Last 32	—	—	—	—	—	Lewis (13)
1991–92	2H	6	34	13	11	10	37	25	37	4th round	—	—	—	—	—	Lewis (11)
1992–93	2H	4	34	19	7	8	56	39	45	5th round	—	—	—	—	—	Latapy (12)
1993–94	2H	5	34	17	4	13	39	30	38	4th round	—	—	—	—	—	Lewis (7)
1994–95	2H	7	34	13	9	12	41	39	35	5th round	—	—	—	—	—	Febras (9)
1995–96	2H	15	34	11	8	15	38	48	41	5th round	—	—	—	—	—	Febras (8)
1996–97	2H	3	34	17	7	10	39	21	58	6th round	—	—	—	—	—	Miguel Bruno (12)
1997–98	1D	15	34	8	12	14	27	41	36	4th round	—	—	—	—	—	João Tomás (7)
1998–99	1D	18	34	4	9	21	30	71	21	4th round	—	—	—	—	—	Dário (8)
1999–2000	2H	5	34	16	9	9	55	37	57	6th round	—	—	—	—	—	João Tomás (19)
2000–01	2H	8	34	14	6	14	51	48	48	4th round	—	—	—	—	—	Dário (21)
2001–02	2H	2	34	17	11	6	60	49	62	6th round	—	—	—	—	—	Dário (17)
2002–03	1D	15	34	8	13	13	38	48	37	Quarter-finals	—	—	—	—	—	Dário (11)
2003–04	1D	13	34	11	5	18	40	42	38	5th round	—	—	—	—	—	Joeano (6)
2004–05	1D	14	34	9	11	14	29	41	38	6th round	—	—	—	—	—	Dário (6)
2005–06	1D	14	34	10	9	15	37	48	39	Quarter-finals	—	—	—	—	—	Joeano (13)
2006–07	1D	13	30	6	8	16	28	46	26	Quarter-finals	—	—	—	—	—	Lino (5)
2007–08	1D	12	30	6	14	10	31	38	32	3rd round	2nd round	—	—	—	—	Lito (9)
2008–09	1D	7	30	10	09	11	28	32	39	4th round	3rd round	—	—	—	—	Lito (7)
2009–10	1D	11	30	08	09	13	37	42	33	4th round	Semi-finals	—	—	—	—	Sougou (9)
2010–11	1D	14	30	07	09	14	32	48	30	Semi-finals	2nd round	—	—	—	—	Miguel Fidalgo (8)
2011–12	1D	13	30	7	8	15	27	38	29	Winner	2nd round	—	—	—	—	Edinho (5)
2012–13	1D	11	30	6	10	14	33	45	28	Quarter-finals	3rd round	EL	Group stage	Supertaça	RU	Edinho (13)
2013–14	1D	8	30	9	10	11	25	35	37	Quarter-finals	2nd round	—	—	—	—	Marcos Paulo (5)
2014–15	1D	15	34	4	17	13	26	46	29	3rd round	3rd round	—	—	—	—	Rui Pedro (6)
2015–16	1D	18	34	5	10	19	32	60	25	5th round	2nd round	—	—	—	—	Pedro Nuno (4)
2016–17	2H	6	42	17	11	14	42	35	62	Quarter-finals	First round	—	—	—	—	Rui Miguel (10)
2017–18	2H	4	38	19	6	13	59	40	63	5th round	First round	—	—	—	—	Donald Djoussé (11)
2018–19	2H	5	34	15	6	13	36	37	51	2nd round	First round	—	—	—	—	Hugo Almeida (10)

- CL = Campeonato da Liga (winners weren't considered Portuguese champions)
- 1D = Primeira Liga
- 2D = Segunda Divisão
- 2H = Liga de Honra

- CWC = Cup Winner's Cup
- FC = Fairs Cities' Cup
- UC = UEFA Cup
- EL = Europa League

== Players ==
=== Current squad ===
As of 25 September 2026

Note: Flags indicate national team as defined under FIFA eligibility rules; some limited exceptions apply. Players may hold more than one non-FIFA nationality.

No.	Pos.	Nation	Player
1	GK	POR	Nuno Macedo
2	DF	ESP	Xavi Grande
3	DF	POR	Ricardo Teixeira
4	DF	BRA	Gui Silva
5	MF	POR	Leandro Silva
7	FW	SEN	Alioune Mané
8	FW	MLI	Kévin Zohi (on loan from Torreense)
9	FW	POR	Martim Tavares
10	FW	FRA	Ilies Faure
11	MF	BRA	Edson Paraíba
12	GK	BRA	Victor Braga
13	DF	BRA	Kauan (on loan from Santa Clara)
15	DF	POR	Káká

No.	Pos.	Nation	Player
17	MF	BRA	Marcos Paulo
19	FW	POR	Afonso Rodrigues
20	MF	COL	Jean Sinisterra
22	DF	POR	Hélder Lopes
23	FW	POR	Rui Gomes
25	MF	HAI	Leverton Pierre
26	MF	POR	Tiago Soares
44	DF	DEN	Pontus Texel (on loan from Mafra)
46	MF	POR	Hugo Nunes
54	DF	POR	Ni Rodrigues
60	MF	POR	João Oliveira
92	FW	SEN	Amadou Coundoul (on loan from Sporting Gijón)
98	GK	POR	Carlos Alves

=== Out on loan ===
Note: Flags indicate national team as defined under FIFA eligibility rules; some limited exceptions apply. Players may hold more than one non-FIFA nationality.

No.	Pos.	Nation	Player
—	MF	POR	Miguel Rebelo (at Atert Bissen until 30 June 2027)

=== Records and statistics ===
==== Most appearances ====
Competitive, professional matches only, appearances as substitute included in total.

#	Name	Career	Appearances
1	(Portugal) Pedro Rocha	1986–04	455
2	(Portugal) Vasco Gervásio	1962–79	430
3	(Portugal) Pedro Roma	1990–92 / 1994–09	386
4	(Portugal) Augusto Rocha	1956–71	373
5	(Portugal) Mário Torres	1950–66	373
6	(Portugal) Vítor Campos	1963–76	345
7	(Portugal) Bentes	1945–60	328
8	(Portugal) Rui Rodrigues	1962–71 / 1976–79	310
9	(Portugal) Tomás Fernandes	1980–90	298
10	(Portugal) Mito	1985–90 / 1993–98	288

==== Most goals ====
Competitive, professional matches only, appearances as substitute included in total.

#	Name	Career	Goals
1	(Portugal) Bentes	1945–60	167
2	(Portugal) Manuel António	1964–65 / 1968–77	153
3	(Brazil) Eldon	1978–83 / 1987–90	134
4	(Portugal) Artur Jorge	1965–69	94
5	(Mozambique) Dário	1996–05	91
6	(Portugal) Francisco André	1953–59	81
7	(Portugal) Alberto Gomes	1936–44 / 1947–49	67
8	(Portugal) Gaio	1959–64	65
9	(Portugal) Ernesto de Sousa	1965–68	64
10	(Portugal) Augusto Rocha	1956–71	59

== Coaches ==
- (Portugal) José Maria Pedroto (1962 – 1964)
- (Portugal) Artur Jorge (16 December 2002 – 28 August 2003)
- (Portugal) Vítor Oliveira (29 August 2003 – 26 January 2004)
- (Portugal) João Carlos Pereira (1 February 2004 – 22 December 2004)
- (Portugal) Nelo Vingada (23 December 2004 – 6 May 2006)
- (Portugal) Manuel Machado (15 May 2006 – 10 September 2007)
- (Portugal) Domingos Paciência (12 September 2007 – 31 May 2009)
- (Portugal) Rogério Gonçalves (9 June 2009 – 4 October 2009)
- (Portugal) André Villas-Boas (14 October 2009 – 2 June 2010)
- (Portugal) Jorge Costa (8 June 2010 – 21 December 2010)
- (Portugal) José Guilherme (26 December 2010 – 21 February 2011)
- (Portugal) Ulisses Morais (23 February 2011 – 17 May 2011)
- (Portugal) Pedro Emanuel (14 June 2011 – 7 April 2013)
- (Portugal) Sérgio Conceição (8 April 2013 – 26 May 2014)
- (Portugal) Paulo Sérgio (2 June 2014 – 15 February 2015)
- (Portugal) José Viterbo (16 February 2015 – 20 September 2015)
- (Portugal) Filipe Gouveia (24 September 2015 – 31 May 2016)
- (Portugal) Costinha (20 June 2016 – 21 May 2017)
- (Portugal) Ivo Vieira (30 May 2017 – 13 November 2017)
- (Portugal) Ricardo Soares (14 November 2017 – 31 March 2018)
- (Portugal) Quim Machado (1 April 2018 – 13 May 2018)
- (Portugal) Carlos Pinto (30 May 2018 – 1 October 2018)
- (Portugal) João Alves (10 October 2018 – 31 May 2019)
- (Portugal) César Peixoto (19 June 2019 – 14 November 2019)
- (Portugal) João Carlos Pereira (18 November 2019 – 10 July 2020)
- (Portugal) Rui Borges (11 July 2020 – 22 September 2021)
- (Portugal) João Carlos Pereira (22 September 2021 – 21 November 2021)
- (Portugal) Pedro Duarte (25 November 2021 – 3 March 2022)
- (Portugal) José Gomes (4 March 2022 – 14 May 2022)

== European Record ==
Note: Académica de Coimbra score is always listed first.

Season	Round	Opponent	Home	Away	Agg.
Inter-Cities Fairs Cup - 1968/1969	1R	(France) Olympique Lyonnais	1–0	0–1	1–1 (c)
UEFA Cup Winners' Cup - 1969/1970	1R	(Finland) KuPS	0–0	1–0	1–0
UEFA Cup Winners' Cup - 1969/1970	2R	(East Germany) 1. FC Magdeburg	2–0	0–1	2–1
UEFA Cup Winners' Cup - 1969/1970	R16	(England) Manchester City	0–0	0–1 (a.e.t.)	2–1
UEFA Cup - 1971/1972	1R	(England) Wolverhampton Wanderers	1–4	0–3	1–7
UEFA Europa League - 2012/2013	GS	(Czech Republic) Viktoria Plzeň	1–1	1–3	3rd
UEFA Europa League - 2012/2013	GS	(Israel) Hapoel Tel Aviv	1–1	0–2	3rd
UEFA Europa League - 2012/2013	GS	(Spain) Atlético de Madrid	2–0	1–2	3rd
