= Nuno Macedo =

Portuguese footballer

Personal information
- Full name: Nuno Alberto Macedo Pereira
- Date of birth: 29 May 1999 (age 27)
- Place of birth: Guimarães, Portugal
- Height: 1.84 m (6 ft 1/2 in)
- Position: Goalkeeper

Team information
- Current team: Académica
- Number: 1

Youth career
- 2008–2009: Fair-Play
- 2009–2012: Vitória Guimarães
- 2012–2018: Moreirense

Senior career*
Years	Team	Apps	(Gls)
2018–2020	Moreirense	3	(0)
2020–2021	Estoril	2	(0)
2021–2023	Penafiel	0	(0)
2023–2025	Oliveirense	29	(0)
2025–	Académica	2	(0)
- * Club domestic league appearances and goals as of 7 May 2026

Nuno Alberto Macedo Pereira (born 29 May 1999) is a Portuguese professional footballer who plays as a goalkeeper for Liga Portugal 2 club Académica.

== Club career ==
He made his Primeira Liga debut for Moreirense on 13 April 2019 in a game against Santa Clara.

On 11 June 2021, he moved to Penafiel.

On 6 July 2023, Macedo signed for Liga Portugal 2 club Oliveirense.
