= Nick Koster (footballer) =

Dutch footballer (born 2003)

Personal information
- Date of birth: 8 January 2003 (age 23)
- Place of birth: Aalsmeer, Netherlands
- Height: 1.82 m (6 ft 0 in)
- Position: Forward

Team information
- Current team: AFC
- Number: 19

Youth career
- –2019: AFC
- 2019–2021: AZ

Senior career*
| Years | Team | Apps | (Gls) |
| 2021–2024 | Jong AZ | 41 | (3) |
| 2024– | AFC | 0 | (0) |

International career
| 2021 | Netherlands U19 | 2 | (0) |
- * Club domestic league appearances and goals as of 23 October 2024

Nick Koster (8 January 2003) is a Dutch footballer who plays as a forward for AFC.

== Club career ==
Koster switched to the academy at AZ in 2019 from AFC Amsterdam. He signed a professional contract with AZ in June 2021 taking him through to the summer of 2023 with AZ, with the option of an extra season. Koster made his debut for Jong AZ when appearing as a substitute on 1 November, 2021 against Jong PSV in a 2–0 away defeat. Koster combined the 2021–22 season playing for Jong AZ in the Eerste Divisie with featuring for AZ in the UEFA Youth League.

== International career ==
Koster was called up to the Netherlands U19 squad in October 2021.
