= Filip Čuić =

Bosnian footballer

Personal information
- Date of birth: 22 February 2003 (age 23)
- Place of birth: Split, Croatia
- Height: 1.88 m (6 ft 2 in)
- Position: Striker

Team information
- Current team: Pogoń Szczecin
- Number: 10

Youth career
- –2018: Tomislav
- 2018–2019: Dugopolje
- 2019–2022: Hajduk Split

Senior career*
Years	Team	Apps	(Gls)
2022–2024	Hajduk Split	7	(1)
2022–2023	→ Radomlje (loan)	22	(5)
2023–2024	Solin	12	(3)
2024	Lokomotiva	5	(0)
2024–2026	Gorica	38	(5)
2026–	Pogoń Szczecin	10	(4)
2026–	Pogoń Szczecin II	1	(0)

International career
2021–2022	Bosnia and Herzegovina U19	7	(6)
2022–2023	Bosnia and Herzegovina U21	7	(1)
- * Club domestic league appearances and goals as of 00:01, 24 May 2026 (UTC)

Filip Čuić (born 22 February 2003) is a professional footballer who plays as a forward for Ekstraklasa club Pogoń Szczecin. Born in Croatia, he represented Bosnia and Herzegovina at youth level.

== Club career ==
Filip Čuić was born in Split, but raised in Donji Brišnik. Čuić family hails from Donji Bršnik, a village in the municipality of Tomislavgrad, Bosnia and Herzegovina. He started his football career at local club Tomislav. He moved to neighbouring Croatia in late 2018, first joining the U-17 team of Dugopolje until the end of the season, before joining the youth academy of the famed Dalmatian club Hajduk Split in 2019, where his older brother Mario was already playing.

Featuring in two Hajduk Split U19 national titles, Čuić was shortlisted for the 2021–22 UEFA Youth League top player award, having scored six goals in five matches in the competition.

In 2022, Čuić was initially signed to a double registration with second-tier Solin, but with Ivan Ćalušić having been pulled from his loan at the Slovenian top-tier side Radomlje, having picked up an injury requiring an operation, Čuić was sent there in his stead, joining his brother Mario as well. On 2 October, Čuić made his first senior league appearance, coming in for Nedim Hadžić in the 78th minute of a 2–1 away loss to Celje.

== International career ==
Featuring prolifically for the Bosnia and Herzegovina U19 team in the previous season, in November 2022, Čuić was called up for the Bosnia and Herzegovina U21 national team.

== Personal life ==
Filip, who is born in Split, Croatia, hails from Tomislavgrad in Bosnia and Herzegovina, where his Herzegovinian Croat parents live. The Ćuićs are a football family, with four brothers, Mario, who is two years older than Filip, and the six and seven years younger, Toma and David, respectively, all play football, while their father, Tomislav Čuić, was a coach in several Bosnian First league clubs and a referee in the same competition.
