= 2021–22 in Spanish football =

Spanish football season

Football in Spain
- Season: 2021–22

Men's football
- La Liga: Real Madrid
- Segunda División: Almería
- Primera División RFEF: Racing Santander
- Copa del Rey: Real Betis
- Copa Federación: Córdoba
- Supercopa: Real Madrid

Women's football
- Primera División: Barcelona
- Segunda División: Levante Las Planas; Alhama
- Copa de la Reina: Barcelona
- Supercopa: Barcelona

The 2021–22 season was the 120th season of competitive association football in Spain.

== National team ==
=== Spain national football team ===
==== Friendlies ====
26 March 2022	Spain	2–1	Albania	Cornellà de Llobregat, Spain
19:45	F. Torres 75'; Olmo 90'	Report	Uzuni 85'	Stadium: RCDE Stadium; Referee: Trustin Farrugia Cann (Malta)

29 March 2022	Spain	5–0	Iceland	A Coruña, Spain
20:45	Morata 36', 39' (pen.); Pino 47'; Sarabia 61', 72'	Report		Stadium: Riazor; Referee: Horațiu Feșnic (Romania)

==== 2022 FIFA World Cup qualification ====
===== Group B =====
Pos	Team	Pld	W	D	L	GF	GA	GD	Pts	Qualification	Spain	Sweden	Greece	Georgia	Kosovo
1	Spain	8	6	1	1	15	5	+10	19	Qualification for 2022 FIFA World Cup	—	1–0	1–1	4–0	3–1
2	Sweden	8	5	0	3	12	6	+6	15	Advance to play-offs	2–1	—	2–0	1–0	3–0
3	Greece	8	2	4	2	8	8	0	10		0–1	2–1	—	1–1	1–1
4	Georgia	8	2	1	5	6	12	−6	7		1–2	2–0	0–2	—	0–1
5	Kosovo	8	1	2	5	5	15	−10	5		0–2	0–3	1–1	1–2	—

Source: FIFA, UEFA
Rules for classification: Tiebreakers

2 September 2021	Sweden	2–1	Spain	Solna, Sweden
20:45 CEST (UTC+02:00)	Isak 6'; Claesson 57'	Report	Soler 5'	Stadium: Friends Arena; Attendance: 16,901; Referee: Anthony Taylor (England)

5 September 2021	Spain	4–0	Georgia	Badajoz, Spain
20:45 CEST (UTC+02:00)	Gayà 14'; Soler 25'; F. Torres 41'; Sarabia 63'	Report		Stadium: Nuevo Vivero; Attendance: 8,444; Referee: Tiago Martins (Portugal)

8 September 2021	Kosovo	0–2	Spain	Pristina, Kosovo
20:45 CEST (UTC+02:00)		Report	Fornals 32'; F. Torres 90'	Stadium: Fadil Vokrri Stadium; Attendance: 1,200; Referee: Bobby Madden (Scotland)

11 November 2021	Greece	0–1	Spain	Athens, Greece
21:45 EET (UTC+02:00)		Report	Sarabia 26' (pen.)	Stadium: Olympic Stadium; Referee: Szymon Marciniak (Poland)

14 November 2021	Spain	1–0	Sweden	Seville, Spain
20:45 CET (UTC+01:00)	Morata 86'	Report		Stadium: La Cartuja; Referee: Felix Brych (Germany)

==== UEFA Euro 2020 ====
===== Knockout phase =====
2 July 2021 Euro 2020 QF	Switzerland	1–1 (a.e.t.) (1–3 p)	Spain	Saint Petersburg, Russia
18:00 CEST	Shaqiri 68'	Report	Zakaria 8' (o.g.)	Stadium: Krestovsky Stadium; Attendance: 24,764; Referee: Michael Oliver (England)
	Penalties
	Gavranović (penalty scored); Schär (penalty missed); Akanji (penalty missed); Vargas (penalty missed)		(penalty missed) Busquets; (penalty scored) Olmo; (penalty missed) Rodri; (penalty scored) Gerard; (penalty scored) Oyarzabal

6 July 2021 Euro 2020 SF	Italy	1–1 (a.e.t.) (4–2 p)	Spain	London, England
21:00 CEST	Chiesa 60'	Report	Morata 80'	Stadium: Wembley Stadium; Attendance: 57,811; Referee: Felix Brych (Germany)
	Penalties
	Locatelli (penalty missed); Belotti (penalty scored); Bonucci (penalty scored); Bernardeschi (penalty scored); Jorginho (penalty scored)		(penalty missed) Olmo; (penalty scored) Gerard; (penalty scored) Thiago; (penalty missed) Morata

==== 2021 UEFA Nations League Finals ====
6 October 2021 2021 UEFA Nations League SF	Italy	1–2	Spain	Milan, Italy
20:45	Pellegrini 83'	Report	F. Torres 17', 45+2'	Stadium: San Siro; Attendance: 33,524; Referee: Sergei Karasev (Russia)

===== Final =====
10 October 2021
20:45

Spain	1–2	France
Oyarzabal 64'	Report	Benzema 66'; Mbappé 80'

San Siro, Milan
Attendance: 31,511
Referee: Anthony Taylor (England)

==== UEFA Nations League ====
===== Group 2 =====
Pos	Team	Pld	W	D	L	GF	GA	GD	Pts	Qualification or relegation	(Spain)	(Portugal)	(Switzerland)	(Czech Republic)
1	Spain	6	3	2	1	8	5	+3	11	Qualification for Nations League Finals	—	1–1	1–2	2–0
2	Portugal	6	3	1	2	11	3	+8	10		0–1	—	4–0	2–0
3	Switzerland	6	3	0	3	6	9	−3	9		0–1	1–0	—	2–1
4	Czech Republic (R)	6	1	1	4	5	13	−8	4	Relegation to League B	2–2	0–4	2–1	—

Source: UEFA
(R) Relegated

2 June 2022	Spain	1–1	Portugal	Seville, Spain
20:45	Morata 25'	Report	Horta 82'	Stadium: Benito Villamarín; Attendance: 41,236; Referee: Michael Oliver (England)

5 June 2022	Czech Republic	2–2	Spain	Prague, Czech Republic
20:45	Pešek 4'; Kuchta 66'	Report	Gavi 45+3'; Martínez 90'	Stadium: Sinobo Stadium; Attendance: 18,245; Referee: François Letexier (France)

9 June 2022	Switzerland	0–1	Spain	Geneva, Switzerland
20:45		Report	Sarabia 13'	Stadium: Stade de Genève; Attendance: 25,875; Referee: Serdar Gözübüyük (Netherlands)

12 June 2022	Spain	2–0	Czech Republic	Málaga, Spain
20:45	Soler 24'; Sarabia 75'	Report		Stadium: Estadio La Rosaleda; Attendance: 30,389; Referee: Cüneyt Çakır (Turkey)

=== Spain national under-23 football team ===
==== Friendlies ====
17 July 2021	Japan	1–1	Spain

==== Summer Olympics ====
Due to the COVID-19 pandemic, the games have been postponed to the summer of 2021. However, their official name remains 2020 Summer Olympics with the rescheduled 2021 dates have yet to be announced.

===== Group C =====
Pos	Team	Pld	W	D	L	GF	GA	GD	Pts	Qualification
1	Spain	3	1	2	0	2	1	+1	5	Advance to knockout stage
2	Egypt	3	1	1	1	2	1	+1	4	Advance to knockout stage
3	Argentina	3	1	1	1	2	3	−1	4	
4	Australia	3	1	0	2	2	3	−1	3	

Source: TOCOG and FIFA
Rules for classification: Group stage tiebreakers

22 July 2021	Egypt	0–0	Spain	Sapporo, Japan
		Report		Stadium: Sapporo Dome; Attendance: 0 Referee: Adham Makhadmeh (Jordan)

25 July 2021	Australia	0–1	Spain	Sapporo, Japan
		Report	Oyarzabal 81'	Stadium: Sapporo Dome; Referee: Bamlak Tessema Weyesa (Ethiopia)

28 July 2021	Spain	1–1	Argentina	Saitama, Japan
	Merino 66'	Report	Belmonte 87'	Stadium: Saitama Stadium 2002; Referee: Ismail Elfath (United States)

===== Knockout stage =====
31 July 2021 QF	Spain	5–2 (a.e.t.)	Ivory Coast	Rifu, Japan
	Olmo 30'; Mir 90+3', 117', 120+1'; Oyarzabal 98' (pen.)	Report	Bailly 10'; Gradel 90+1'	Stadium: Miyagi Stadium; Attendance: 0 Referee: Jesus Valenzuela (Venezuela)

3 August 2021 2020 Summer Olympics SF	Japan	0–1 (a.e.t.)	Spain	Saitama, Japan
20:00 UTC+9		Report	Asensio 115'	Stadium: Saitama Stadium 2002; Referee: Kevin Ortega (Peru)

===== Final =====
7 August 2021
20:30

Brazil	2–1 (a.e.t.)	Spain
Cunha 45+2'; Malcom 108'	Report (TOCOG); Report (FIFA)	Oyarzabal 61'

International Stadium Yokohama, Yokohama
Attendance: 0 (Note: Played behind closed doors due to the COVID-19 pandemic in Japan)
Referee: Chris Beath (Australia)

Brazil	Spain

GK	1	Aderbar Santos
RB	13	Dani Alves (c)
CB	15	Nino
CB	3	Diego Carlos
LB	6	Guilherme Arana	(yellow card) 20'
CM	8	Bruno Guimarães
CM	5	Douglas Luiz	(yellow card) 89'
RW	11	Antony		(substituted off) 112'
AM	20	Claudinho		(substituted off) 106'
LW	9	Matheus Cunha	(yellow card) 64'	(substituted off) 91'
CF	10	Richarlison	(yellow card) 31'	(substituted off) 114'
Substitutes:
GK	12	Brenno
DF	4	Ricardo Graça
MF	2	Gabriel Menino		(substituted on) 112'
MF	18	Matheus Henrique
MF	19	Reinier		(substituted on) 106'
FW	7	Paulinho		(substituted on) 114'
FW	17	Malcom		(substituted on) 91'
Head coach:
André Jardine

GK	1	Unai Simón
RB	18	Óscar Gil		(substituted off) 91'
CB	12	Eric García	(yellow card) 27'
CB	4	Pau Torres
LB	3	Marc Cucurella		(substituted off) 91'
DM	6	Martín Zubimendi		(substituted off) 112'
CM	8	Mikel Merino (c)		(substituted off) 46'
CM	16	Pedri
RF	7	Marco Asensio		(substituted off) 46'
CF	11	Mikel Oyarzabal		(substituted off) 104'
LF	19	Dani Olmo
Substitutes:
GK	13	Álvaro Fernández
DF	5	Jesús Vallejo		(substituted on) 91'
DF	20	Juan Miranda		(substituted on) 91'
MF	14	Carlos Soler		(substituted on) 46'
MF	15	Jon Moncayola		(substituted on) 112'
MF	21	Bryan Gil	(yellow card) 105+1'	(substituted on) 46'
FW	9	Rafa Mir		(substituted on) 104'
Head coach:
Luis de la Fuente

Assistant referees:
Anton Schetinin (Australia)
George Lakrindis (Australia)
Fourth official:
Artur Soares Dias (Portugal)
Reserve assistant referee:
Rui Tavares (Portugal)
Video assistant referee:
Abdulla Al-Marri (Qatar)
Assistant video assistant referees:
Muhammad Taqi (Singapore)
Chris Penso (United States)

=== Spain women's national football team ===
==== Friendlies ====
21 October 2021	Spain	3–0	Morocco	Cáceres
20:00	Del Castillo 28', 68'; Sarriegi 60'	Report		Stadium: Estadio Príncipe Felipe; Attendance: 2,044; Referee: Merima Čelik (Bosnia and Herzegovina)

7 April 2022	Spain	1–1	Brazil	Alicante
20:00	Putellas 8'	Report	Geyse 39'	Stadium: Estadio José Rico Pérez; Attendance: 8,833; Referee: Rebecca Welch (England)

25 June 2022	Spain	7–0	Australia	Huelva
21:30				Stadium: Nuevo Colombino

==== 2023 FIFA Women's World Cup qualification ====
===== Group B =====
Pos	Team	Pld	W	D	L	GF	GA	GD	Pts	Qualification	(Spain)	(Scotland)	(Ukraine)	(Hungary)	(Faroe Islands)
1	Spain	8	8	0	0	53	0	+53	24	2023 FIFA Women's World Cup	—	8–0	5–0	3–0	12–0
2	Scotland	8	5	1	2	22	13	+9	16	Play-offs	0–2	—	1–1	2–1	7–1
3	Ukraine	8	3	1	4	12	20	−8	10		0–6	0–4	—	2–0	4–0
4	Hungary	8	3	0	5	19	19	0	9		0–7	0–2	4–2	—	7–0
5	Faroe Islands	8	0	0	8	2	56	−54	0		0–10	0–6	0–3	1–7	—

Source: UEFA
Rules for classification: Tiebreakers

16 September 2021 2023 Women's World Cup qualification	Faroe Islands	0–10	Spain	Tórshavn, Faroe Islands
		Report	Sarriegi 7', 32', 55', 60'; Guerrero 8'; Putellas 50'; L.García 58'; Guijarro 64'; Caldentey 70'; Alexaindri 90+5'	Stadium: Tórsvøllur; Attendance: 1,066; Referee: Paula Brady (Football Association of Ireland)

21 September 2021 2023 Women's World Cup qualification	Hungary	0–13	Spain	Baku
		Report	González 21', 24', 20', 31', 87'; Hermoso 33', 43', 67', 82', 90+3'; Calentey 57'; Navarro 75'; Eizagirre 84'	Stadium: ASK Arena; Referee: Maria Marotta (Italy)

26 October 2021 2023 Women's World Cup qualification	Ukraine	0–6	Spain	Kovalivka
		Report	Putellas 8'; Sarriegi 26', 82'; Eizagirre 68'; Apanashchenko 84' (o.g.); Redondo 90+2'	Stadium: Kolos Stadium; Referee: Galiya Echeva (Bulgaria)

25 November 2021 2023 Women's World Cup qualification	Spain	12–0	Faroe Islands	Seville
	González 2', 41', 51', 74'; Bonmatí 17', 50'; Redondo 25'; Caldentey 39' (pen.), 52', 57'; Putellas 83'; Sarriegi 89'	Report		Stadium: Estadio de La Cartuja; Attendance: 1,000; Referee: Triinu Laos (Estonia)

30 November 2021 2023 Women's World Cup qualification	Spain	8–0	Scotland	Seville
	Sarriegi 20', 58'; Caldentey 33', 83'; Bonmatí 41', 61'; Putellas 64'; Hermoso 80'	Report		Stadium: Estadio de La Cartuja; Attendance: 1,200; Referee: Lina Lehtovaara (Finland)

12 April 2022 2023 Women's World Cup qualification	Scotland	0–2	Spain	Glasgow
19:35		Report	Hermoso 14' (pen.), 78'	Stadium: Hampden Park; Attendance: 7,804; Referee: Esther Staubli (Switzerland)

==== 2022 Arnold Clark Cup ====
Pos	Team	Pld	W	D	L	GF	GA	GD	Pts
1	England (H, C)	3	1	2	0	4	2	+2	5
2	Spain	3	1	2	0	2	1	+1	5
3	Canada	3	1	1	1	2	2	0	4
4	Germany	3	0	1	2	2	5	−3	1

Source: BBC
Rules for classification: 1) points; 2) goal difference; 3) goals scored; 4) head-to-head result; 5) fair play ranking.
(C) Champions; (H) Hosts

17 February 2022	Germany	1–1	Spain	Middlesbrough, England
	Schüller 88'	Report	Putellas 46'	Stadium: Riverside Stadium; Referee: Tess Oloffson (Sweden)

20 February 2022	England	0–0	Spain	Norwich, England
		Report		Stadium: Carrow Road; Attendance: 14,284

23 February 2022	Spain	1–0	Canada	Wolverhampton, England
	Putellas 21'	Report		Stadium: Molineux Stadium; Referee: Cheryl Foster (Wales)

== UEFA competitions ==
=== UEFA Super Cup ===
11 August 2021
20:00 UTC+1

Chelsea (England)	1–1 (a.e.t.)	(Spain) Villarreal
Ziyech 27'	Report	Gerard 73'
Penalties
Havertz (penalty missed); Azpilicueta (penalty scored); Alonso (penalty scored); Mount (penalty scored); Jorginho (penalty scored); Pulisic (penalty scored); Rüdiger (penalty scored)	6–5	(penalty scored) Gerard; (penalty missed) Mandi; (penalty scored) Estupiñán; (penalty scored) Gómez; (penalty scored) Raba; (penalty scored) Foyth; (penalty missed) Albiol

Windsor Park, Belfast
Attendance: 10,435
Referee: Sergei Karasev (Russia)

=== UEFA Champions League ===
==== Group stage ====
===== Group B =====
Pos	Team	Pld	W	D	L	GF	GA	GD	Pts	Qualification	LIV	ATM	POR	MIL
1	(England) Liverpool	6	6	0	0	17	6	+11	18	Advance to knockout phase	—	2–0	2–0	3–2
2	(Spain) Atlético Madrid	6	2	1	3	7	8	−1	7	Advance to knockout phase	2–3	—	0–0	0–1
3	(Portugal) Porto	6	1	2	3	4	11	−7	5	Transfer to Europa League	1–5	1–3	—	1–0
4	(Italy) Milan	6	1	1	4	6	9	−3	4		1–2	1–2	1–1	—

Source: UEFA

===== Group D =====
Pos	Team	Pld	W	D	L	GF	GA	GD	Pts	Qualification	RMA	INT	SHE	SHK
1	(Spain) Real Madrid	6	5	0	1	14	3	+11	15	Advance to knockout phase	—	2–0	1–2	2–1
2	(Italy) Inter Milan	6	3	1	2	8	5	+3	10	Advance to knockout phase	0–1	—	3–1	2–0
3	(Moldova) Sheriff Tiraspol	6	2	1	3	7	11	−4	7	Transfer to Europa League	0–3	1–3	—	2–0
4	(Ukraine) Shakhtar Donetsk	6	0	2	4	2	12	−10	2		0–5	0–0	1–1	—

Source: UEFA

===== Group E =====
Pos	Team	Pld	W	D	L	GF	GA	GD	Pts	Qualification	BAY	BEN	BAR	DKV
1	(Germany) Bayern Munich	6	6	0	0	22	3	+19	18	Advance to knockout phase	—	5–2	3–0	5–0
2	(Portugal) Benfica	6	2	2	2	7	9	−2	8	Advance to knockout phase	0–4	—	3–0	2–0
3	(Spain) Barcelona	6	2	1	3	2	9	−7	7	Transfer to Europa League	0–3	0–0	—	1–0
4	(Ukraine) Dynamo Kyiv	6	0	1	5	1	11	−10	1		1–2	0–0	0–1	—

Source: UEFA

===== Group F =====
Pos	Team	Pld	W	D	L	GF	GA	GD	Pts	Qualification	MUN	VIL	ATA	YB
1	(England) Manchester United	6	3	2	1	11	8	+3	11	Advance to knockout phase	—	2–1	3–2	1–1
2	(Spain) Villarreal	6	3	1	2	12	9	+3	10	Advance to knockout phase	0–2	—	2–2	2–0
3	(Italy) Atalanta	6	1	3	2	12	13	−1	6	Transfer to Europa League	2–2	2–3	—	1–0
4	(Switzerland) Young Boys	6	1	2	3	7	12	−5	5		2–1	1–4	3–3	—

Source: UEFA

===== Group G =====
Pos	Team	Pld	W	D	L	GF	GA	GD	Pts	Qualification	LIL	SAL	SEV	WOL
1	(France) Lille	6	3	2	1	7	4	+3	11	Advance to knockout phase	—	1–0	0–0	0–0
2	(Austria) Red Bull Salzburg	6	3	1	2	8	6	+2	10	Advance to knockout phase	2–1	—	1–0	3–1
3	(Spain) Sevilla	6	1	3	2	5	5	0	6	Transfer to Europa League	1–2	1–1	—	2–0
4	(Germany) VfL Wolfsburg	6	1	2	3	5	10	−5	5		1–3	2–1	1–1	—

Source: UEFA

==== Knockout phase ====
===== Round of 16 =====
Team 1	Agg.	Team 2	1st leg	2nd leg
Atlético Madrid (Spain)	2–1	(England) Manchester United	1–1	1–0
Villarreal (Spain)	4–1	(Italy) Juventus	1–1	3–0
Paris Saint-Germain (France)	2–3	(Spain) Real Madrid	1–0	1–3

===== Quarter-finals =====
Team 1	Agg.	Team 2	1st leg	2nd leg
Chelsea (England)	4–5	(Spain) Real Madrid	1–3	3–2 (a.e.t.)
Manchester City (England)	1–0	(Spain) Atlético Madrid	1–0	0–0
Villarreal (Spain)	2–1	(Germany) Bayern Munich	1–0	1–1

===== Semi-finals =====
Team 1	Agg.	Team 2	1st leg	2nd leg
Manchester City (England)	5–6	(Spain) Real Madrid	4–3	1–3 (a.e.t.)
Liverpool (England)	5–2	(Spain) Villarreal	2–0	3–2

===== Final =====
28 May 2022
21:36 UTC+2 (Note: The final, originally scheduled for 21:00, was delayed 36 minutes due to security issues with fans entering the stadium.)

Liverpool (England)	0–1	(Spain) Real Madrid
	Report	Vinícius 59'

Stade de France, Saint-Denis
Attendance: 75,000
Referee: Clément Turpin (France)

=== UEFA Europa League ===
==== Group stage ====
===== Group B =====
Pos	Team	Pld	W	D	L	GF	GA	GD	Pts	Qualification	MON	RSO	PSV	STU
1	(France) Monaco	6	3	3	0	7	4	+3	12	Advance to round of 16	—	2–1	0–0	1–0
2	(Spain) Real Sociedad	6	2	3	1	9	6	+3	9	Advance to knockout round play-offs	1–1	—	3–0	1–1
3	(Netherlands) PSV Eindhoven	6	2	2	2	9	8	+1	8	Transfer to Europa Conference League	1–2	2–2	—	2–0
4	(Austria) Sturm Graz	6	0	2	4	3	10	−7	2		1–1	0–1	1–4	—

Source: UEFA

===== Group G =====
Pos	Team	Pld	W	D	L	GF	GA	GD	Pts	Qualification	LEV	BET	CEL	FER
1	(Germany) Bayer Leverkusen	6	4	1	1	14	5	+9	13	Advance to round of 16	—	4–0	3–2	2–1
2	(Spain) Real Betis	6	3	1	2	12	12	0	10	Advance to knockout round play-offs	1–1	—	4–3	2–0
3	(Scotland) Celtic	6	3	0	3	13	15	−2	9	Transfer to Europa Conference League	0–4	3–2	—	2–0
4	(Hungary) Ferencváros	6	1	0	5	5	12	−7	3		1–0	1–3	2–3	—

Source: UEFA

==== Knockout stage ====
===== Knockout round play-offs =====
Team 1	Agg.	Team 2	1st leg	2nd leg
Sevilla (Spain)	3–2	(Croatia) Dinamo Zagreb	3–1	0–1
RB Leipzig (Germany)	5–3	(Spain) Real Sociedad	2–2	3–1
Barcelona (Spain)	5–3	(Italy) Napoli	1–1	4–2
Zenit Saint Petersburg (Russia)	2–3	(Spain) Real Betis	2–3	0–0

===== Round of 16 =====
Team 1	Agg.	Team 2	1st leg	2nd leg
Sevilla (Spain)	1–2	(England) West Ham United	1–0	0–2 (a.e.t.)
Barcelona (Spain)	2–1	(Turkey) Galatasaray	0–0	2–1
Real Betis (Spain)	2–3	(Germany) Eintracht Frankfurt	1–2	1–1 (a.e.t.)

===== Quarter-finals =====
Team 1	Agg.	Team 2	1st leg	2nd leg
Eintracht Frankfurt (Germany)	4–3	(Spain) Barcelona	1–1	3–2

=== UEFA Youth League ===
==== UEFA Champions League Path ====
===== Group B =====
Pos	Team	Pld	W	D	L	GF	GA	GD	Pts	Qualification	LIV	ATM	POR	MIL
1	(England) Liverpool	6	3	2	1	9	4	+5	11	Round of 16	—	2–0	4–0	1–0
2	(Spain) Atlético Madrid	6	3	1	2	9	6	+3	10 (Note: Head-to-head: Atlético Madrid 3 pts (0 GD, 3 GF), Porto 3 pts (0 GD, 3 GF). Goal difference in all group matches: Atlético Madrid +3, Porto –1.)	Play-offs	2–0	—	1–2	3–0
3	(Portugal) Porto	6	3	1	2	8	9	−1	10		1–1	1–2	—	3–1
4	(Italy) Milan	6	0	2	4	3	10	−7	2		1–1	1–1	0–1	—

Source: UEFA

===== Group D =====
Pos	Team	Pld	W	D	L	GF	GA	GD	Pts	Qualification	RMA	INT	SHK	SHE
1	(Spain) Real Madrid	6	4	1	1	11	6	+5	13 (Note: Head-to-head points: Real Madrid 4, Inter Milan 1.)	Round of 16	—	2–1	1–0	4–1
2	(Italy) Inter Milan	6	4	1	1	10	6	+4	13	Play-offs	1–1	—	1–0	2–1
3	(Ukraine) Shakhtar Donetsk	6	3	0	3	14	5	+9	9		3–2	0–1	—	6–0
4	(Moldova) Sheriff Tiraspol	6	0	0	6	4	22	−18	0		0–1	2–4	0–5	—

Source: UEFA

===== Group E =====
Pos	Team	Pld	W	D	L	GF	GA	GD	Pts	Qualification	BEN	DKV	BAR	BAY
1	(Portugal) Benfica	6	5	0	1	14	4	+10	15	Round of 16	—	1–0	4–0	4–0
2	(Ukraine) Dynamo Kyiv	6	4	1	1	14	3	+11	13	Play-offs	4–0	—	4–1	2–1
3	(Spain) Barcelona	6	1	1	4	4	14	−10	4		0–3	0–0	—	2–0
4	(Germany) Bayern Munich	6	1	0	5	4	15	−11	3		0–2	0–4	3–2	—

Source: UEFA

===== Group F =====
Pos	Team	Pld	W	D	L	GF	GA	GD	Pts	Qualification	MUN	VIL	ATA	YB
1	(England) Manchester United	6	5	0	1	12	9	+3	15	Round of 16	—	1–4	4–2	2–1
2	(Spain) Villarreal	6	3	2	1	15	9	+6	11	Play-offs	1–2	—	2–0	3–3
3	(Italy) Atalanta	6	2	1	3	11	12	−1	7		1–2	2–2	—	3–0
4	(Switzerland) Young Boys	6	0	1	5	7	15	−8	1		0–1	1–3	2–3	—

Source: UEFA

===== Group G =====
Pos	Team	Pld	W	D	L	GF	GA	GD	Pts	Qualification	SAL	SEV	LIL	WOL
1	(Austria) Red Bull Salzburg	6	4	0	2	10	5	+5	12	Round of 16	—	2–0	3–1	3–0
2	(Spain) Sevilla	6	3	2	1	8	3	+5	11	Play-offs	2–0	—	0–0	2–0
3	(France) Lille	6	3	1	2	7	6	+1	10		1–0	0–3	—	2–0
4	(Germany) VfL Wolfsburg	6	0	1	5	2	13	−11	1		1–2	1–1	0–3	—

Source: UEFA

==== Domestic Champions Path ====
===== First round =====
Team 1	Agg.	Team 2	1st leg	2nd leg
Pogoń Szczecin (Poland)	3–4	(Spain) Deportivo La Coruña	3–0	0–4

===== Second round =====
Team 1	Agg.	Team 2	1st leg	2nd leg
Deportivo La Coruña (Spain)	5–4	(Israel) Maccabi Haifa	5–1	0–3

==== Play-offs ====
===== Knockout round play-offs =====
Team 1	Score	Team 2
AZ (Netherlands)	3–3 (4–3 p)	(Spain) Villarreal
Hajduk Split (Croatia)	0–0 (2–3 p)	(Spain) Atlético Madrid
Deportivo La Coruña (Spain)	2–2 (2–3 p)	(Ukraine) Dynamo Kyiv
Rangers (Scotland)	0–1	(Spain) Sevilla

===== Round of 16 =====
Team 1	Score	Team 2
Real Madrid (Spain)	2–3	(Spain) Atlético Madrid
Paris Saint-Germain (France)	2–0	(Spain) Sevilla

===== Quarter-finals =====
Team 1	Score	Team 2
Borussia Dortmund (Germany)	0–1	(Spain) Atlético Madrid

===== Semi-finals =====
Team 1	Score	Team 2
Atlético Madrid (Spain)	0–5	(Austria) Red Bull Salzburg

=== UEFA Women's Champions League ===
==== Qualifying rounds ====
===== Round 1 =====
====== Semi-finals ======
Team 1	Score	Team 2
Levante (Spain)	2–1	(Scotland) Celtic

====== Final ======
Team 1	Score	Team 2
Levante (Spain)	4–3 (a.e.t.)	(Norway) Rosenborg

===== Round 2 =====
Team 1	Agg.	Team 2	1st leg	2nd leg
Levante (Spain)	2–4	(France) Lyon	1–2	1–2
Real Madrid (Spain)	2–1	(England) Manchester City	1–1	1–0

==== Group stage ====
===== Group B =====
Pos	Team	Pld	W	D	L	GF	GA	GD	Pts	Qualification	PSG	RMA	KHA	BRE
1	(France) Paris Saint-Germain	6	6	0	0	25	0	+25	18	Advance to Quarter-finals	—	4–0	5–0	6–0
2	(Spain) Real Madrid	6	4	0	2	12	6	+6	12	Advance to Quarter-finals	0–2	—	3–0	5–0
3	(Ukraine) Zhytlobud-1 Kharkiv	6	1	1	4	2	15	−13	4		0–6	0–1	—	0–0
4	(Iceland) Breiðablik	6	0	1	5	0	18	−18	1		0–2	0–3	0–2	—

Source: UEFA

===== Group C =====
Pos	Team	Pld	W	D	L	GF	GA	GD	Pts	Qualification	BAR	ARS	HOF	KOG
1	(Spain) Barcelona	6	6	0	0	24	1	+23	18	Advance to Quarter-finals	—	4–1	4–0	5–0
2	(England) Arsenal	6	3	0	3	14	13	+1	9 (Note: Head-to-head points: Arsenal 3, 1899 Hoffenheim 3. Head-to-head goal differences: Arsenal +1, 1899 Hoffenheim −1.)	Advance to Quarter-finals	0–4	—	4–0	3–0
3	(Germany) 1899 Hoffenheim	6	3	0	3	11	15	−4	9		0–5	4–1	—	5–0
4	(Denmark) HB Køge	6	0	0	6	2	22	−20	0		0–2	1–5	1–2	—

Source: UEFA

==== Knockout phase ====
===== Quarter-finals =====
Team 1	Agg.	Team 2	1st leg	2nd leg
Real Madrid (Spain)	3–8	(Spain) Barcelona	1–3	2–5

===== Semi-finals =====
Team 1	Agg.	Team 2	1st leg	2nd leg
Barcelona (Spain)	5–3	(Germany) VfL Wolfsburg	5–1	0–2

===== Final =====
21 May 2022
19:00 UTC+2

Barcelona (Spain)	1–3	(France) Lyon
Putellas 41'	Report	Henry 6'; Hegerberg 23'; Macario 33'

Juventus Stadium, Turin
Attendance: 32,257
Referee: Lina Lehtovaara (Finland)

== Men's football ==
=== League season ===
==== La Liga ====
Pos	Team	Pld	W	D	L	GF	GA	GD	Pts	Qualification or relegation
1	Real Madrid (C)	38	26	8	4	80	31	+49	86	Qualification for the Champions League group stage
2	Barcelona	38	21	10	7	68	38	+30	73	Qualification for the Champions League group stage
3	Atlético Madrid	38	21	8	9	65	43	+22	71	Qualification for the Champions League group stage
4	Sevilla	38	18	16	4	53	30	+23	70	Qualification for the Champions League group stage
5	Real Betis	38	19	8	11	62	40	+22	65	Qualification for the Europa League group stage (Note: Since the winners of the 2021–22 Copa del Rey, Real Betis, qualified for European competition based on league position, the Europa League berth awarded to the Copa del Rey winners was passed to the sixth-placed team, and the Europa Conference League berth awarded to the sixth-placed team was passed to the seventh-placed team.)
6	Real Sociedad	38	17	11	10	40	37	+3	62	Qualification for the Europa League group stage
7	Villarreal	38	16	11	11	63	37	+26	59	Qualification for the Europa Conference League play-off round
8	Athletic Bilbao	38	14	13	11	43	36	+7	55	
9	Valencia	38	11	15	12	48	53	−5	48	
10	Osasuna	38	12	11	15	37	51	−14	47	
11	Celta Vigo	38	12	10	16	43	43	0	46	
12	Rayo Vallecano	38	11	9	18	39	50	−11	42 (Note: Head-to-head points: Rayo Vallecano 9, Elche 7, Espanyol 1.)	
13	Elche	38	11	9	18	40	52	−12	42	
14	Espanyol	38	10	12	16	40	53	−13	42	
15	Getafe	38	8	15	15	33	41	−8	39 (Note: Head-to-head points: Getafe 8, Mallorca 5, Cádiz 2.)	
16	Mallorca	38	10	9	19	36	63	−27	39	
17	Cádiz	38	8	15	15	35	51	−16	39	
18	Granada (R)	38	8	14	16	44	61	−17	38	Relegation to Segunda División
19	Levante (R)	38	8	11	19	51	76	−25	35	Relegation to Segunda División
20	Alavés (R)	38	8	7	23	31	65	−34	31	Relegation to Segunda División

Source: LaLiga Santander
Rules for classification: 1) Points; 2) Head-to-head points; 3) Head-to-head goal difference; 4) Goal difference; 5) Goals scored; 6) Fair-play points (Note: Head-to-head record is used only after all the matches between the teams in question have been played)
(C) Champions; (R) Relegated

==== Segunda División ====
Pos	Team	Pld	W	D	L	GF	GA	GD	Pts	Qualification or relegation
1	Almería (C, P)	42	24	9	9	68	35	+33	81 (Note: Almería finished ahead of Valladolid on head-to-head points: Almería 3–1 Valladolid, Valladolid 2–2 Almería.)	Promotion to La Liga
2	Valladolid (P)	42	24	9	9	71	43	+28	81	Promotion to La Liga
3	Eibar	42	23	11	8	61	45	+16	80	Qualification for promotion play-offs
4	Las Palmas	42	19	13	10	57	47	+10	70	Qualification for promotion play-offs
5	Tenerife	42	20	9	13	53	37	+16	69	Qualification for promotion play-offs
6	Girona (O, P)	42	20	8	14	57	42	+15	68 (Note: Girona finished ahead of Oviedo on head-to-head points: Girona 2–1 Oviedo, Oviedo 0–0 Girona.)	Qualification for promotion play-offs
7	Oviedo	42	17	17	8	57	41	+16	68	
8	Ponferradina	42	17	12	13	57	55	+2	63	
9	Cartagena	42	18	6	18	63	57	+6	60	
10	Zaragoza	42	12	20	10	39	46	−7	56	
11	Burgos	42	15	10	17	41	41	0	55	
12	Leganés	42	13	15	14	50	51	−1	54 (Note: Leganés finished ahead of Huesca on head-to-head points: Leganés 2–1 Huesca, Huesca 0–2 Leganés.)	
13	Huesca	42	13	15	14	49	44	+5	54	
14	Mirandés	42	15	7	20	58	62	−4	52 (Note: Mirandés finished ahead of Ibiza on head-to-head points: Mirandés 4–0 Ibiza, Ibiza 0–2 Mirandés.)	
15	Ibiza	42	12	16	14	53	59	−6	52	
16	Lugo	42	10	20	12	46	52	−6	50	
17	Sporting Gijón	42	11	13	18	43	48	−5	46	
18	Málaga	42	11	12	19	36	57	−21	45	
19	Amorebieta (R)	42	9	16	17	44	63	−19	43	Relegation to Primera Federación
20	Real Sociedad B (R)	42	10	10	22	43	61	−18	40	Relegation to Primera Federación
21	Fuenlabrada (R)	42	6	15	21	39	65	−26	33	Relegation to Primera Federación
22	Alcorcón (R)	42	6	11	25	37	71	−34	29	Relegation to Primera Federación

Source: LaLiga SmartBank
Rules for classification: 1) points; 2) head-to-head points; 3) head-to-head goal difference; 4) goal difference; 5) number of goals scored
(C) Champions; (O) Play-off winners; (P) Promoted; (R) Relegated

=== Cup competitions ===
==== 2021–22 Copa del Rey ====
===== Final =====
23 April 2022
22:00 CEST

Real Betis	1–1 (a.e.t.)	Valencia
Iglesias 11'	Report	Duro 30'
Penalties
Willian José (penalty scored); Joaquín (penalty scored); Guardado (penalty scored); Tello (penalty scored); Miranda (penalty scored)	5–4	(penalty scored) Soler; (penalty scored) Račić; (penalty scored) Guedes; (penalty missed) Musah; (penalty scored) Gayà

La Cartuja, Seville
Attendance: 53,387
Referee: Alejandro Hernández Hernández (Las Palmas)

==== Supercopa de España ====
Semi-finals
13 January 2022 – Riyadh
Atlético Madrid	1
Athletic Bilbao	2
12 January 2022 – Riyadh
Barcelona	2
Real Madrid (a.e.t.)	3

Final
16 January 2022 – Riyadh
Athletic Bilbao	0
Real Madrid	2

===== Final =====
16 January 2022
21:30

Athletic Bilbao	0–2	Real Madrid
	Report	Modrić 38'; Benzema 52' (pen.)

King Fahd International Stadium, Riyadh
Attendance: 30,000
Referee: César Soto Grado (La Rioja)

==== Copa Federación de España ====
===== Final =====
23 November	Córdoba (4)	1–0	Guijuelo (5)	Córdoba
18:30	Javi Flores 54'			Stadium: Nuevo Arcángel

== Women's football ==
=== League season ===
==== Primera División ====
Pos	Team	Pld	W	D	L	GF	GA	GD	Pts	Qualification or relegation
1	Barcelona (C)	30	30	0	0	159	11	+148	90	Qualification for the Champions League group stage
2	Real Sociedad	30	21	3	6	67	38	+29	66	Qualification for the Champions League second round
3	Real Madrid	30	19	3	8	41	31	+10	60	Qualification for the Champions League first round
4	Atlético de Madrid	30	17	8	5	71	28	+43	59	
5	Granadilla	30	16	6	8	42	44	−2	54	
6	Levante	30	15	5	10	52	39	+13	50	
7	Athletic Club	30	14	5	11	45	47	−2	47	
8	Sevilla	30	10	8	12	37	52	−15	38	
9	Betis	30	7	10	13	31	52	−21	31	
10	Sporting de Huelva	30	6	13	11	28	44	−16	31	
11	Alavés	30	8	6	16	30	63	−33	30	
12	Villarreal	30	8	5	17	29	63	−34	29	
13	Madrid CFF	30	8	3	19	42	64	−22	27	
14	Valencia	30	7	6	17	27	56	−29	27	
15	Eibar (R)	30	7	2	21	35	63	−28	23	Relegation to Primera Federación
16	Rayo Vallecano (R)	30	3	5	22	27	68	−41	14	Relegation to Primera Federación

Source: RFEF Primera Iberdrola
Rules for classification: 1) Points; 2) Head-to-head points; 3) Goal difference; 4) Number of goals scored
(C) Champions; (R) Relegated

=== Cup competitions ===
==== Copa de la Reina ====
===== Final =====
29 May 2022	Sporting de Huelva	1–6	Barcelona	Alcorcón
11:30	Castelló 62'	Report	Dolan 25' (o.g.); Mapi León 32'; Crnogorčević 71'; Pina 80'; Martens 86'; Alexia 90+3'	Stadium: Estadio Municipal de Santo Domingo; Referee: Zulema González González

==== Supercopa de España ====
Semi-finals
19 January 2022 – Las Rozas de Madrid
Barcelona	1
Real Madrid	0
20 January 2022 – Las Rozas de Madrid
Levante	2
Atlético Madrid	3

Final
23 January 2022 – Las Rozas de Madrid
Barcelona	7
Atlético Madrid	0

===== Final =====
23 January 2022
12:00

Barcelona	7–0	Atlético Madrid
Engen 16'; Hansen 24', 27', 50'; Rolfö 47'; Martens 85', 90'	Report

La Ciudad del Fútbol, Las Rozas de Madrid
Attendance: 1,123
Referee: Marta Huerta de Aza (Tenerife)
