= 2023 FIFA Women's World Cup qualification =

Tournament details
- Dates: 16 September 2021 – 23 February 2023
- Teams: 172 (from 6 confederations)

Tournament statistics
- Matches played: 505
- Goals scored: 2,143 (4.24 per match)
- Top scorer: (Belgium) Tessa Wullaert (17 goals)

The 2023 FIFA Women's World Cup qualification process determined 30 of the 32 teams which played in the 2023 FIFA Women's World Cup, with the co-hosts Australia and New Zealand qualifying automatically. It was the ninth FIFA Women's World Cup, the quadrennial international women's football world championship tournament. The tournament was the first Women's World Cup to be hosted in multiple countries, the third by an AFC member association after the 1991 and 2007 editions in China, the first to be held in the Southern Hemisphere, the first senior FIFA tournament in Oceania, and also the first FIFA tournament to be hosted across multiple confederations (with Australia in the AFC and New Zealand in the OFC).

The field was expanded from 24 teams in the 2019 edition to 32 in the 2023 edition.

== Qualified teams ==
Status of countries with respect to the 2023 FIFA Women's World Cup: Team qualified Team failed to qualify Team withdrew or suspended Did not enter or not FIFA member

Of the total 32 slots (29 direct and 3 playoffs), the following teams qualified directly to fill the 29 direct slots. The remaining 3 playoff slots were determined by the 2023 FIFA Women's World Cup qualification (inter-confederation play-offs) held in February 2023 in New Zealand.

Team	Qualified as	Qualification date	Appearance in finals	Last appearance	Consecutive streak	Previous best performance
Australia	Co-hosts	25 June 2020	8th	2019	8	Quarter-finals (2007, 2011, 2015)
New Zealand	Co-hosts	25 June 2020	6th	2019	5	Group stage (1991, 2007, 2011, 2015, 2019)
Japan	2022 AFC Women's Asian Cup QF winners	30 January 2022	9th	2019	9	Champions (2011)
South Korea	2022 AFC Women's Asian Cup QF winners	30 January 2022	4th	2019	3	Round of 16 (2015)
China	2022 AFC Women's Asian Cup QF winners	30 January 2022	8th	2019	3	Runners-up (1999)
Philippines	2022 AFC Women's Asian Cup QF winners	30 January 2022	1st	—	1	Debut
Vietnam	2022 AFC Women's Asian Cup play-offs winners	6 February 2022	1st	—	1	Debut
Sweden	UEFA qualification Group A winners	12 April 2022	9th	2019	9	Runners-up (2003)
Spain	UEFA qualification Group B winners	12 April 2022	3rd	2019	3	Round of 16 (2019)
France	UEFA qualification Group I winners	12 April 2022	5th	2019	4	4th place (2011)
Denmark	UEFA qualification Group E winners	2 May 2022 (Note: On 2 May 2022, UEFA announced that Russia was removed from Women's World Cup qualification due to their country's invasion of Ukraine, with all their earlier results considered null and void. Denmark, therefore, qualified for the Women's World Cup, as no other teams could surpass them.)	5th	2007	1	Quarter-finals (1991, 1995)
United States	2022 CONCACAF W Championship Group A winners	7 July 2022	9th	2019	9	Champions (1991, 1999, 2015, 2019)
Canada	2022 CONCACAF W Championship Group B winners	8 July 2022	8th	2019	8	4th place (2003)
Costa Rica	2022 CONCACAF W Championship Group B runners-up	8 July 2022	2nd	2015	1	Group stage (2015)
Jamaica	2022 CONCACAF W Championship Group A runners-up	11 July 2022	2nd	2019	2	Group stage (2019)
Zambia	2022 Women's Africa Cup of Nations QF winners	13 July 2022	1st	—	1	Debut
Morocco	2022 Women's Africa Cup of Nations QF winners	13 July 2022	1st	—	1	Debut
Nigeria	2022 Women's Africa Cup of Nations QF winners	14 July 2022	9th	2019	9	Quarter-finals (1999)
South Africa	2022 Women's Africa Cup of Nations QF winners	14 July 2022	2nd	2019	2	Group stage (2019)
Colombia	2022 Copa América Femenina SF winners	25 July 2022	3rd	2015	1	Round of 16 (2015)
Brazil	2022 Copa América Femenina SF winners	26 July 2022	9th	2019	9	Runners-up (2007)
Argentina	2022 Copa América Femenina third-place winners	29 July 2022	4th	2019	2	Group stage (2003, 2007, 2019)
Norway	UEFA qualification Group F winners	2 September 2022	9th	2019	9	Champions (1995)
Germany	UEFA qualification Group H winners	3 September 2022	9th	2019	9	Champions (2003, 2007)
England	UEFA qualification Group D winners	3 September 2022	6th	2019	5	Third place (2015)
Italy	UEFA qualification Group G winners	6 September 2022	4th	2019	2	Quarter-finals (1991, 2019)
Netherlands	UEFA qualification Group C winners	6 September 2022	3rd	2019	3	Runners-up (2019)
Switzerland	UEFA play-offs 1st ranking	11 October 2022	2nd	2015	1	Round of 16 (2015)
Republic of Ireland	UEFA play-offs 2nd ranking	11 October 2022	1st	—	1	Debut
Haiti	Inter-confederation play-offs Group B winners	22 February 2023	1st	—	1	Debut
Portugal	Inter-confederation play-offs Group A winners	22 February 2023	1st	—	1	Debut
Panama	Inter-confederation play-offs Group C winners	23 February 2023	1st	—	1	Debut

== Qualification process ==
After the number of teams qualifying for the Women's World Cup was increased, a new slot allocation was approved by the Bureau of the FIFA Council on 24 December 2020. The slots for the host nations, Australia and New Zealand, were taken directly from the quotas allocated to their confederations, the AFC and OFC respectively.

=== Summary of qualification ===
Qualifying matches started in September 2021 and ended in February 2023. Matches have been played on dates within the FIFA International Match Calendar.

Apart from the hosts Australia and New Zealand, 207 of 209 remaining FIFA member associations could qualify through their own confederation's qualifying process if they choose to enter. The exceptions were Chad and Pakistan, whose football associations were suspended by FIFA. A third exception might have been Russia after initially receiving a four-year ban from all major sporting events by the World Anti-Doping Agency (WADA) on 9 December 2019, after Russian Anti-Doping Agency (RUSADA) was found non-compliant for handing over manipulated laboratory data to investigators. However, the Russian women's team could still enter qualification. The decision was appealed to the Court of Arbitration for Sport (CAS), which ruled in WADA's favour but reduced the ban to two years. The CAS ruling also allowed the name "Russia" to be displayed on uniforms if the words "Neutral Athlete" or "Neutral Team" have equal prominence. Had Russia qualified for the tournament, its female players would have been able to use their country's name, flag or anthem at the Women's World Cup, unlike their male counterparts, as the ban scheduled to expire on 16 December 2022. But earlier on 28 February, FIFA and UEFA announced Russia's suspension from all competitions following the Russian invasion of Ukraine. On 2 May, UEFA announced that Russia was no longer to continue participating in qualification, that their prior results were nullified, and that Group E continued with five teams.

Confederation	Tournament	Direct slots	Play-off slots	Teams started	Teams eliminated	Teams qualified	Qualifying start date	Qualifying end date
AFC	2022 AFC Women's Asian Cup	5+1	2	27 (Note: Australia took part in the Women's Asian Cup but already qualified for the Women's World Cup as co-hosts.)	20	5+1	17 September 2021	6 February 2022
CAF	2022 Women's Africa Cup of Nations	4	2	43	37	4	18 October 2021	17 July 2022
CONCACAF	2022 CONCACAF W Championship	4	2	32	26	4	16 February 2022	11 July 2022
CONMEBOL	2022 Copa América Femenina	3	2	10	5	3	8 July 2022	29 July 2022
OFC	2022 OFC Women's Nations Cup	0+1	1	9	8	0+1	13 July 2022	30 July 2022
UEFA	2023 FIFA Women's World Cup qualification (UEFA)	11	1	51	39	11	16 September 2021	11 October 2022
Play-offs	Inter-confederation play-offs	3	—N/a	(10)	7	3	18 February 2023	23 February 2023
Total	2023 FIFA Women's World Cup qualification	30+2	10	172	142	30+2	16 September 2021	23 February 2023

== Confederation qualification ==
=== AFC ===
As in the previous World Cup cycle, the AFC Women's Asian Cup served as the World Cup qualifying tournament for AFC members. The World Cup qualifying process was as follows:

- Qualifying stage: The 2022 AFC Women's Asian Cup qualification competition was held between 17 and 29 September and between 18 and 24 October 2021. Teams competed for qualification for the final tournament, where they were joined by final tournament hosts India and the top three teams of the 2018 AFC Women's Asian Cup, Japan, Australia, and China, who qualified automatically.
- Final tournament: Twelve teams played in the 2022 AFC Women's Asian Cup, which was held from 20 January to 6 February 2022. They were drawn into three groups of four teams. The top two teams of each group, along with the two-best third-placed teams, advanced to the knockout stage. The four semi-finalists qualified for the World Cup. The losers of the quarter-finals (except Australia, who qualified automatically for the World Cup as hosts) advanced to the play-offs.

North Korea withdrew on 29 July 2021 from the Women's Asian Cup qualifiers due to COVID-19 pandemic-related safety concerns, followed by Turkmenistan on 6 August because of pandemic-related travel restrictions. In a letter to the AFC published on 8 September, Iraq decided not to take part. Afghanistan also withdrew from qualification later in September as the women's team's participation was uncertain due to the Taliban takeover of the country.

During the Women's Asian Cup, host team India was unable to play their second group stage match against Chinese Taipei due to having fewer than 13 players available, with the remaining team members testing positive for COVID-19. They were considered to have withdrawn from the competition, and all previous matches played by them were considered "null and void" and were not considered in determining the final group rankings.

==== Knockout stage ====
Quarter-finals
30 January – Navi Mumbai
China	3
Vietnam	1
30 January – Navi Mumbai
Japan	7
Thailand	0
30 January – Pune
Australia	0
South Korea	1
30 January – Pune
Chinese Taipei	1 (3)
Philippines (p)	1 (4)

Semi-finals
3 February – Pune
China (p)	2 (4)
Japan	2 (3)
3 February – Pune
South Korea	2
Philippines	0

Final
6 February – Navi Mumbai
China	3
South Korea	2

==== Play-offs ====
The format of the play-off round depended on the performance of Australia, who qualified automatically for the World Cup as hosts. Since Australia was eliminated in the quarter-finals, the play-offs format was for the remaining three quarter-final losers to play a single round-robin play-off. The best team after three matches advanced to the World Cup, and the remaining two teams entered the inter-confederation play-offs.

Pos	Team	Pld	Pts
1	Vietnam	2	6
2	Chinese Taipei	2	3
3	Thailand	2	0

Source: AFC

=== CAF ===
As in the previous World Cup cycle, the Women's Africa Cup of Nations served as the World Cup qualifying tournament for CAF members. The World Cup qualifying process was as follows:

- Qualifying stage: 2022 Women's Africa Cup of Nations qualification competition was held between 18 and 26 October 2021 and between 14 and 23 February 2022. Teams competed for qualification for the final tournament, where they were joined by final tournament hosts Morocco.
- Final tournament: Twelve teams played in the 2022 Women's Africa Cup of Nations which was held from 2–23 July 2022. They were drawn into three groups of four teams. The top two teams of each group, along with the two-best third-placed teams, advanced to the knockout stage. The four semi-finalists qualified for the World Cup. The losers of the quarter-finals played a one-match repechage, with the winners advancing to the inter-confederation play-offs.

==== Knockout stage ====
Quarter finals
13 July – Rabat (Moulay Abdellah)
Morocco	2
Botswana	1
14 July – Casablanca
Cameroon	0
Nigeria	1
13 July – Casablanca
Zambia (p)	1 (4)
Senegal	1 (2)
14 July – Rabat (Moulay Hassan)
South Africa	1
Tunisia	0

Semi finals
18 July – Rabat (Moulay Abdellah)
Morocco (p)	1 (5)
Nigeria	1 (4)
18 July – Casablanca
Zambia	0
South Africa	1

Final
23 July – Rabat (Moulay Abdellah)
Morocco	1
South Africa	2
Third place
22 July – Casablanca
Nigeria	0
Zambia	1

Repechage
17 July – Rabat (Moulay Hassan)
Botswana	0
Cameroon	1
17 July – Casablanca
Senegal (p)	0 (4)
Tunisia	0 (2)

=== CONCACAF ===
As in the previous World Cup cycle, the CONCACAF W Championship served as the World Cup qualifying tournament for CONCACAF members. The World Cup qualifying process was as follows:

- Qualifying stage: The 2022 CONCACAF W Championship qualification competition was held in February 2022. Teams were drawn into six groups of five, and played single round-robin matches (two home and two away). The six group winners advanced to the final tournament to join the two highest-ranked CONCACAF teams, Canada and the United States, who qualified automatically.
- Final tournament: Eight teams played in the 2022 CONCACAF W Championship. They were drawn into two groups of four teams and played single round-robin matches. The top two teams of each group advanced to the knockout stage and qualified for the World Cup. The third-placed team in each group advanced to the inter-confederation play-offs.

==== Group stage ====
Group A

Pos	Team	Pld	Pts
1	United States	3	9
2	Jamaica	3	6
3	Haiti	3	3
4	Mexico (H)	3	0

Source: CONCACAF
(H) Hosts
Group B

Pos	Team	Pld	Pts
1	Canada	3	9
2	Costa Rica	3	6
3	Panama	3	3
4	Trinidad and Tobago	3	0

Source: CONCACAF

==== Knockout stage ====
Semi-finals
14 July – San Nicolás de los Garza
United States	3
Costa Rica	0
14 July – San Nicolás de los Garza
Canada	3
Jamaica	0

Final
18 July – Guadalupe
United States	1
Canada	0
Third place match
18 July – Guadalupe
Costa Rica	0
Jamaica (a.e.t.)	1

=== CONMEBOL ===
The Copa América Femenina was held from 8–30 July 2022, providing three direct qualifying places and two play-off places for the Women's World Cup. The top two teams from each group advanced to the knockout stage, from which the winners of the semi-final and third place matches qualified for the World Cup. The loser of the third place match advanced to the inter-confederation play-offs. The third-placed teams from each group played a fifth place play-off, the winner of which also advanced to the inter-confederation play-offs.

==== Knockout stage ====
Semi-finals
25 July – Bucaramanga
Colombia	1
Argentina	0
26 July – Bucaramanga
Brazil	2
Paraguay	0

Final
30 July – Bucaramanga
Colombia	0
Brazil	1

Fifth place match
24 July – Armenia
Chile (p)	1 (4)
Venezuela	1 (2)

Third place match
29 July – Armenia
Argentina	3
Paraguay	1

=== OFC ===
The OFC Women's Nations Cup was held from 13 to 30 July, with Fiji hosting the tournament. It was originally scheduled for July and August 2022, but was shifted to January and February 2022 to accommodate changes to the FIFA Women's International Match Calendar. It was subsequently pushed back to July due to the COVID-19 pandemic.

New Zealand did not take part as they had already qualified for the World Cup as co-hosts, and American Samoa opted not to participate due to continuing difficulties related to the pandemic. The remaining nine teams were ranked according to the 25 March world rankings and drawn into three groups on 10 May, from which the top two teams in each group and the top two third place teams advanced to the knockout stage. Papua New Guinea advanced to the inter-confederation play-offs as tournament winners.

==== Knockout stage ====
Quarter-finals
23 July 2022 – Suva
Samoa	4
New Caledonia	2
23 July 2022 – Suva
Papua New Guinea (p)	3 (3)
Tonga	3 (2)
24 July 2022 – Suva
Fiji	2
Cook Islands	0
24 July 2022 – Suva
Tahiti	0
Solomon Islands	1

Semi-finals
27 July 2022 – Suva
Samoa	0
Papua New Guinea	3
27 July 2022 – Suva
Fiji	3
Solomon Islands	1

Final
30 July 2022 – Suva
Papua New Guinea	2
Fiji	1
Third place
30 July 2022 – Suva
Samoa	1 (5)
Solomon Islands (p)	1 (6)

=== UEFA ===
The World Cup qualifying process was played in two stages:

- Group stage: 51 teams were drawn into nine groups of five or six teams, where each group played a home-and-away round-robin format. The nine group winners qualified directly for the World Cup, while the nine runners-up advanced to the play-offs.
- Play-offs: The nine teams played two knockout rounds of single-leg matches, with the best three runners-up entering in the second round. Among the three second round play-off winners, the two teams with the best combined records in the group stage (8 matches, excluding the ones against sixth-placed teams for those from groups with six teams) and second round play-offs (1 match) qualified for the World Cup, while the team with the lowest combined record (group stage plus second play-off round) entered the inter-confederation play-offs.

==== Group stage ====
Group A
Group B
Group C

Pos	Team	Pld	Pts
1	Sweden	8	22
2	Republic of Ireland	8	17
3	Finland	8	10
4	Slovakia	8	8
5	Georgia	8	0

Source: UEFA

Pos	Team	Pld	Pts
1	Spain	8	24
2	Scotland	8	16
3	Ukraine	8	10
4	Hungary	8	9
5	Faroe Islands	8	0

Source: UEFA

Pos	Team	Pld	Pts
1	Netherlands	8	20
2	Iceland	8	18
3	Czech Republic	8	11
4	Belarus	8	7
5	Cyprus	8	1

Source: UEFA
Group D
Group E
Group F

Pos	Team	Pld	Pts
1	England	10	30
2	Austria	10	22
3	Northern Ireland	10	19
4	Luxembourg	10	9
5	North Macedonia	10	6
6	Latvia	10	3

Source: UEFA

Pos	Team	Pld	Pts
1	Denmark	8	24
2	Bosnia and Herzegovina	8	11
3	Montenegro	8	9
4	Azerbaijan	8	7
5	Malta	8	7
6	Russia	0	0

Source: UEFA

Pos	Team	Pld	Pts
1	Norway	10	28
2	Belgium	10	22
3	Poland	10	20
4	Albania	10	10
5	Kosovo	10	7
6	Armenia	10	0

Source: UEFA
Group G
Group H
Group I

Pos	Team	Pld	Pts
1	Italy	10	27
2	Switzerland	10	25
3	Romania	10	19
4	Croatia	10	10
5	Lithuania	10	5
6	Moldova	10	1

Source: UEFA

Pos	Team	Pld	Pts
1	Germany	10	27
2	Portugal	10	22
3	Serbia	10	21
4	Turkey	10	10
5	Israel	10	9
6	Bulgaria	10	0

Source: UEFA

Pos	Team	Pld	Pts
1	France	10	30
2	Wales	10	20
3	Slovenia	10	18
4	Greece	10	13
5	Estonia	10	6
6	Kazakhstan	10	0

Source: UEFA

==== Play-offs ====
Round 1
6 October 2022 – Vizela
Portugal	2
Belgium	1
6 October 2022 – Glasgow
Scotland (a.e.t.)	1
Austria	0
6 October 2022 – Cardiff
Wales (a.e.t.)	1
Bosnia and Herzegovina	0

Round 2
11 October 2022 – Paços de Ferreira
Portugal (a.e.t.)	4
Iceland	1
11 October 2022 – Glasgow
Scotland	0
Republic of Ireland	1
11 October 2022 – Zürich
Switzerland (a.e.t.)	2
Wales	1

Ranking of play-off winners To rank the three play-off winners, their results in their respective groups and round 2 of the play-offs were combined. As some groups had five teams and others had six, any group matches against teams who finished sixth in their groups were discounted; also, as not all teams played in both play-off rounds, results in round 1 of play-offs were not counted either. As a result, nine matches played by each team (eight in the group stage and one in round 2 of the play-offs) were counted for the purposes of determining the ranking. The two higher-placed winners qualified for the Women's World Cup and the lowest-placed winner advanced to the inter-confederation play-offs.

Pos	Team	Pld	W	D	L	GF	GA	GD	Pts	Qualification
1	Switzerland	9	7	1	1	25	5	+20	22	2023 FIFA Women's World Cup
2	Republic of Ireland	9	6	2	1	27	4	+23	20	2023 FIFA Women's World Cup
3	Portugal	9	6	1	2	22	10	+12	19	Inter-confederation play-offs

Source: UEFA
Rules for classification: Counting only matches against teams ranked first to fifth in the group and in play-offs round 2, 1) Points; 2) Goal difference; 3) Goals scored; 4) Away goals scored; 5) Wins; 6) Away wins; 7) Lower disciplinary points total; 8) UEFA national team coefficient ranking.

== Inter-confederation play-offs ==
The final three spots at the FIFA Women's World Cup were decided through a ten-team play-off tournament. The tournament was used as a test event for New Zealand to host prior to the Women's World Cup.

In the play-off draw, four teams were seeded into groups based on the FIFA Women's World Rankings, with a maximum of one seeded team per confederation. Teams from the same confederation were not drawn into the same group. The winner of each group qualified for the FIFA Women's World Cup.

=== Group A ===
Semi-final
18 February 2023 – Hamilton
Cameroon	2
Thailand	0

Final
22 February 2023 – Hamilton
Portugal	2
Cameroon	1

=== Group B ===
Semi-final
18 February 2023 – Auckland
Senegal	0
Haiti	4

Final
22 February 2023 – Auckland
Chile	1
Haiti	2

=== Group C ===
Semi-finals
19 February 2023 – Hamilton
Chinese Taipei	2 (2)
Paraguay (p)	2 (4)
19 February 2023 – Auckland
Papua New Guinea	0
Panama	2

Final
23 February 2023 – Hamilton
Paraguay	0
Panama	1

== Top goalscorers ==
There were 2,143 goals scored in 505 matches, for an average of 4.24 goals per match.

17 goals

- (Belgium) Tessa Wullaert

15 goals

- (Germany) Lea Schüller

14 goals

- (Haiti) Roselord Borgella

13 goals

- (Austria) Nicole Billa
- (Denmark) Signe Bruun
- (England) Beth Mead

12 goals

- (Jamaica) Khadija Shaw

11 goals

- (Nicaragua) Yessenia Flores
- (Spain) Amaiur Sarriegi

10 goals

- (Belgium) Tine De Caigny
- (England) Ella Toone
- (England) Ellen White
- (France) Marie-Antoinette Katoto

9 goals

- (Hungary) Fanni Vágó
- (Spain) Esther González
- (Switzerland) Coumba Sow

8 goals

- Bethany England
- (England) Georgia Stanway
- (Haiti) Batcheba Louis
- (Italy) Cristiana Girelli
- (Netherlands) Vivianne Miedema
- (Serbia) Jovana Damnjanović
- (Slovenia) Lara Prašnikar
- (Spain) Mariona Caldentey
- (Switzerland) Ana-Maria Crnogorčević
- (Vietnam) Phạm Hải Yến

7 goals

- (Australia) Sam Kerr
- (Chinese Taipei) Lai Li-chin
- (Costa Rica) Raquel Rodríguez
- (Cuba) Yeranis Lee
- (Denmark) Stine Larsen
- (England) Lauren Hemp
- (Italy) Arianna Caruso
- (Italy) Valentina Giacinti
- (Netherlands) Jill Roord
- (Northern Ireland) Rachel Furness
- (Poland) Nikola Karczewska
- (Republic of Ireland) Katie McCabe
- (South Africa) Linda Motlhalo
- (Tunisia) Mariem Houij

6 goals

- (Argentina) Yamila Rodríguez
- (Belgium) Janice Cayman
- (Burundi) Aniella Uwimana
- (Haiti) Melchie Dumornay
- (Jamaica) Trudi Carter
- (Kenya) Neddy Atieno
- (Mexico) Katty Martínez
- (Norway) Lisa-Marie Karlseng Utland
- (Poland) Ewa Pajor
- (Republic of Ireland) Denise O'Sullivan
- (Senegal) Nguenar Ndiaye
- (South Africa) Hildah Magaia
- (South Korea) Ji So-yun
- (Switzerland) Ramona Bachmann
- (Thailand) Kanyanat Chetthabutr
