= Lily Agg =

Irish footballer (born 1993)

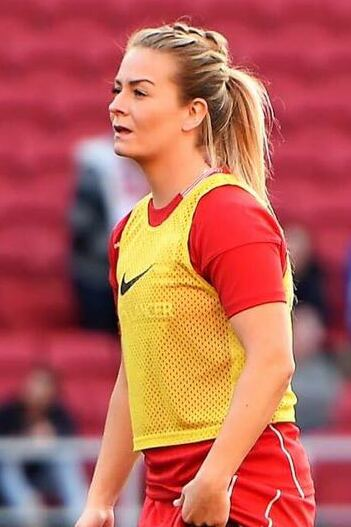

Personal information
- Full name: Lily Maria Phoebe Agg
- Date of birth: 17 December 1993 (age 32)
- Place of birth: Brighton, England
- Height: 5 ft 5 in (1.65 m)
- Position: Midfielder

Youth career
- Eastbourne Borough
- Polegate Grasshoppers
- Brighton & Hove Albion
- 2010–2012: Arsenal

Senior career*
Years	Team	Apps	(Gls)
2012–2014	Brighton & Hove Albion	26	(7)
2014	London Bees	0	(0)
2014–2016	Millwall Lionesses	22	(6)
2016	Brighton & Hove Albion		
2016	Cardiff Met	0	(0)
2017	Bristol City	3	(1)
2017–2018	Frankfurt	13	(1)
2018–2019	Charlton Athletic	19	(7)
2019–2023	London City Lionesses	36	(4)
2023–2026	Birmingham City	16	(7)
2026	→ Durham (loan)	4	(1)

International career
2022–	Republic of Ireland	22	(3)

Managerial career
- 2026–: Athlone Town
- * Club domestic league appearances and goals

Lily Maria Phoebe Agg (born 17 December 1993) is an Irish football manager and former player, who is currently the manager of Athlone Town.

Agg studied at the University of Brighton and has a teaching degree. Alongside her football career, Agg has worked as a Sports Lecturer at Academy 1 Sports in Essex.

== Early life ==
Agg grew up in Eastbourne with her mother Ruth and three siblings. She attended Bishop Bell School and began playing youth football for Eastbourne Borough when she was five years old, before joining Polegate Grasshoppers when she was 11.

== Club career ==
=== Arsenal ===
Afterwards, Agg earned trials with Chelsea and Arsenal and would end up joining the Arsenal W.F.C. Academy. Agg declined the offer of a full-time contract from Arsenal, preferring to prioritise her university studies.

=== Brighton & Hove Albion ===
Agg started her professional career back at her hometown club, Brighton & Hove Albion, having initially joined at the Under 12's level in Brighton Centre's of Excellence before moving to Arsenal.

=== London Bees ===
In January 2014, Agg left Brighton & Hove Albion, in order to play at a higher level. She returned to London, joining the London Bees, where she scored the club's first ever goal in their 3–1 FA Women's Cup win over Leeds United.

=== Millwall Lionesses ===
Agg left the Bees after a short spell to join the Millwall Lionesses. She was the club's joint-leading goal scorer for the 2014 WSL 2 season, and extended her contract for another year at the end of the campaign.

=== Return to Brighton & Hove Albion ===
After a two-year period away, Lily rejoined Brighton & Hove Albion in 2015. During this spell, the club gain promotion by winning the FA Women's Premier League Championship Play Off.

=== Cardiff Metropolitan Ladies F.C. ===
Agg played for Cardiff Met. Ladies F.C., including during their 2016–17 UEFA Women's Champions League campaign, where she scored both goals in Cardiff's 3–2 loss to Spartak Subotica.

=== Bristol City ===
Agg moved to Women's Super League side Bristol City in January 2017. She paused her teaching career in order to join her new club on a full-time basis. She made only three appearances, with one start, and scored one goal.

=== FFC Frankfurt ===
In August 2017, Agg moved to the Frauen-Bundesliga to join FFC Frankfurt. At the time, she was the only British player play in Germany. Agg enjoyed playing in Germany, praising the professionalism of the club and the competitiveness of the Frauen-Bundesliga. In her only season in Germany, the club managed a 6th-placed finish. However, Agg struggled for game time, making only 13 appearances, with nine of them involving her coming on as a substitute. Her only goal came in a league defeat to Freiburg.

=== Charlton ===
After a short stint in Germany, Agg joined Charlton for what was their inaugural season in the Championship. She made a total of six appearances and scored on two occasions in her return to the English league.

=== London City Lionesses ===
Agg joined fellow Championship club London City Lionesses ahead of the 2019–20 season. However, due to suffering a fractured tibia against Reading in a pre-season friendly, she missed the entirety of her debut season at the club.

She returned to action in the 2020–21 season.

Following the conclusion of the 2022–23 season season, Agg left London City.

=== Birmingham City ===
On 19 August 2023, Birmingham City announced they had signed Agg on a one-year deal.

On 27 May 2024, she signed a new one-year contract, with the option of a one-year extension, with the club. Agg underwent surgery following an ACL injury in the 2024–25 season. As a result of the surgery, Agg also received a melanoma in situ cancer diagnosis.

On 8 July 2025, it was announced that the club had exercised an extension clause in Agg's contract to keep her with the club during the 2025–26 season.

==== Loan to Durham ====
On 3 February 2026, Agg joined Durham on loan for the remainder of the 2025–26 season. She scored her first goal for Durham on the 29 of March; two minutes after scoring, she came off injured. A few days later, Agg announced that she had suffered an Achilles injury, and would be out for the rest of the season.

==== Departure from Birmingham City ====
In May 2026, Birmingham City announced that Agg would depart the club at the end of the season.

== International career ==
On 19 June 2022, Agg made her debut for the Republic of Ireland women's national football team in a friendly against the Philippines in Antalya, Turkey. She marked the occasion by scoring the only goal in Ireland's 1–0 win. Agg had previously represented England up to under-19 level, but changed her allegiance to Ireland after an approach from the team's coach Vera Pauw. Agg was eligible for Ireland due to her grandmother Breda Greene being from County Cork, but the process of obtaining citizenship and switching her football eligibility proved to be protracted, delayed several times by injury and the COVID-19 pandemic in the Republic of Ireland.

On 1 September 2022, Agg was named player of the match in Ireland's 1–0 2023 FIFA Women's World Cup qualification – UEFA Group A win over Finland at Tallaght Stadium. She entered play as a first-half substitute for the injured Ruesha Littlejohn then headed the winning goal, which secured Ireland's place in the 2023 FIFA Women's World Cup qualification – UEFA play-offs. In the lead up to the 2023 World Cup, she sustained an ankle ligaments injury in training, but she recovered in time to be part of the squad for the tournament.

Agg was set to make her return to the national team following her ACL injury with a call-up to Ireland's World Cup 2027 qualifying matches against Poland in April 2026, but sustained an Achilles rupture in early April and was withdrawn from selection.

== Coaching career ==
In May 2026, following back-to-back ACL injury and rupture of her Achilles, Agg made a post on her Instagram where she suggested she didn't know if she would return to play ‘‘at all.’’ Later that month, she was announced as manager of League of Ireland Women's Premier Division Champions Athlone Town.

== Career statistics ==
Appearances and goals by national team and year
National team	Year	Apps	Goals
Republic of Ireland	2022	6	2
Republic of Ireland	2023	5	1
Total		11	3

Scores and results list Republic of Ireland's goals first. Score column indicates score after each Agg goal. Updated as of 24 September 2023.

International goals scored by Lily Agg
No.	Cap	Date	Venue	Opponent	Score	Result	Competition	Ref.
1	1	19 June 2022	Bellis Hotel Sports Center, Antalya, Turkey	Philippines	1–0	1–0	Friendly	
2	3	1 September 2022	Tallaght Stadium, Dublin, Ireland	Finland	1–0	1–0	2023 FIFA Women's World Cup qualification	
3	12	24 September 2023	Aviva Stadium, Dublin, Ireland	Northern Ireland	3–0	3–0	2023-24 UEFA Women's Nations League	
