= Christy Grimshaw =

Scottish footballer (born 1995)

Personal information
- Full name: Christy Louise Grimshaw
- Date of birth: 8 November 1995 (age 31)
- Place of birth: Kirkcaldy, Scotland
- Height: 5 ft 8 in (1.73 m)
- Position: Midfielder

Team information
- Current team: AC Milan
- Number: 11

Youth career
- Deeside

College career
Years	Team	Apps	(Gls)
2014–2018	Barry Buccaneers	65	(31)

Senior career*
Years	Team	Apps	(Gls)
2011–2013	Aberdeen	15	(3)
2019–2020	Metz	13	(1)
2020–	AC Milan	77	(8)

International career^{‡}
2021–	Scotland	18	(3)
- * Club domestic league appearances and goals as of 19 July 2024 ‡ National team caps and goals as of 15 October 2026

Christy Louise Grimshaw (born 8 November 1995) is a Scottish professional footballer who plays as a midfielder for Serie A club AC Milan and the Scotland national team.

== Early life ==
Grimshaw was born in Kirkcaldy but raised in Stonehaven, where she was educated at Mackie Academy.

== Club career ==
After starting her club career at Deeside, Grimshaw moved to the local Scottish Women's Premier League club Aberdeen Ladies and played in their first team at 17 years old. In 2014 she began studying at Barry University in Miami and playing college soccer for the "Barry Buccaneers" under Scottish coach Denise Brolly. In a five-year stint (she redshirted in 2016) she played 65 games and scored 31 goals.

After her graduation Grimshaw rejected offers from English FA WSL teams Bristol City and Brighton to sign for FC Metz of the French Division 1 Féminine. She started seven of her 13 league appearances for Metz, scoring one goal, as the club finished bottom of the 2019–20 Division 1 Féminine table and were relegated.

In July 2020, Grimshaw signed for Italian Serie A club Milan, a scenario which she described as: "like a football fairy tale". Milan finished as runners-up in both the league and Coppa Italia, but Grimshaw was happy with life at the club and her coach Maurizio Ganz. She signed a contract extension in May 2021.

== International career ==
Interim coach Stuart McLaren called up Grimshaw for her debut in the Scotland women's national football team in June 2021, for a 10-day training camp which included friendly matches against Northern Ireland and Wales.

She won her debut cap in her first game, appearing as a 90th-minute substitute for Claire Emslie in Scotland's 1–0 win over Northern Ireland at Seaview in Belfast. She scored her first goal for Scotland in a 7–1 2023 FIFA Women's World Cup qualification win over the Faroe Islands at Hampden Park on 21 September 2021.

== Career statistics ==
=== International ===
As of 31 October 2023

Appearances and goals by national team and year
National team	Year	Apps	Goals
Scotland	2021	8	2
Scotland	2022	3	0
Scotland	2023	5	0
Total		16	2

Scores and results list Scotland's goal tally first, score column indicates score after each Grimshaw goal.

List of international goals scored by Christy Grimshaw
No.	Date	Venue	Opponent	Score	Result	Competition
1	21 September 2021	Hampden Park, Glasgow, Scotland	Faroe Islands	4–0	7–1	2023 FIFA Women's World Cup qualification
2	22 October 2021	Hampden Park, Glasgow, Scotland	Hungary	1–0	2–1	2023 FIFA Women's World Cup qualification
3	13 October 2026	St Mirren Park, Paisley, Scotland	Czech Republic	3–2	3–2	2027 FIFA Women's World Cup play-offs
