= 2023 FIFA Women's World Cup qualification – UEFA Group A =

Football tournament qualification stage

UEFA Group A of the 2023 FIFA Women's World Cup qualification competition consists of five teams: Sweden, Finland, Republic of Ireland, Slovakia, and Georgia. The composition of the nine groups in the qualifying group stage was decided by the draw held on 30 April 2021, with the teams seeded according to their coefficient ranking.

The group is played in home-and-away round-robin format between 17 September 2021 and 6 September 2022, with a pause for the Women's Euro 2022 in July. The group winners qualify for the final tournament, while the runners-up advance to the play-offs second round if they are one of the three best runners-up among all nine groups (counting results against the fifth-placed team).

== Standings ==
Pos	Team	Pld	W	D	L	GF	GA	GD	Pts	Qualification	(Sweden)	(Republic of Ireland)	(Finland)	(Slovakia)	(Georgia (country))
1	Sweden	8	7	1	0	32	2	+30	22	2023 FIFA Women's World Cup	—	1–1	2–1	3–0	4–0
2	Republic of Ireland	8	5	2	1	26	4	+22	17	Play-offs	0–1	—	1–0	1–1	11–0
3	Finland	8	3	1	4	14	12	+2	10		0–5	1–2	—	2–1	6–0
4	Slovakia	8	2	2	4	9	9	0	8		0–1	0–1	1–1	—	2–0
5	Georgia	8	0	0	8	0	54	−54	0		0–15	0–9	0–3	0–4	—

Source: UEFA
Rules for classification: Tiebreakers

== Matches ==
Times are CET/CEST, (Note: CEST (UTC+2) for dates between 28 March and 31 October 2021 and between 27 March and 30 October 2022, and CET (UTC+1) for all other dates.) as listed by UEFA (local times, if different, are in parentheses).

17 September 2021
17:30

Slovakia	0–1	Sweden
	Report (FIFA); Report (UEFA)	Rolfö 10'

NTC Senec, Senec
Referee: Shona Shukrula (Netherlands)

21 September 2021
17:15 (18:15 EEST)

Finland	2–1	Slovakia
Engman 37'; Öling 68'	Report (FIFA); Report (UEFA)	Mikolajová 63'

Veritas Stadion, Turku
Attendance: 2,473
Referee: Marta Frias Acedo (Spain)
21 September 2021
18:30

Sweden	4–0	Georgia
Angeldal 40'; Eriksson 45+4'; Seger 84' (pen.), 90+3'	Report (FIFA); Report (UEFA)

Gamla Ullevi, Gothenburg
Referee: Lucie Šulcová (Czech Republic)

21 October 2021
17:00 (20:00 GET)

Georgia	0–3	Finland
	Report (FIFA); Report (UEFA)	Sällström 17'; Franssi 68'; Alanen 71' (pen.)

Mikheil Meskhi Stadium, Tbilisi
Referee: Liudmyla Telbukh (Ukraine)
21 October 2021
20:00 (19:00 IST)

Republic of Ireland	0–1	Sweden
	Report (FIFA); Report (UEFA)	Lo. Quinn 39' (o.g.)

Tallaght Stadium, Dublin
Attendance: 4,017
Referee: Deborah Anex (Switzerland)

26 October 2021
16:30

Slovakia	2–0	Georgia
Mikolajová 38'; Šurnovská 40'	Report (FIFA); Report (UEFA)

NTC Poprad, Poprad
Referee: Lizzy Van Der Helm (Netherlands)
26 October 2021
17:15 (18:15 EEST)

Finland	1–2	Republic of Ireland
Engman 52'	Report (FIFA); Report (UEFA)	Connolly 10'; D. O'Sullivan 56'

Helsinki Olympic Stadium, Helsinki
Referee: Alexandra Collin (France)

25 November 2021
18:30

Sweden	2–1	Finland
Rolfö 11'; Hurtig 80'	Report (FIFA); Report (UEFA)	Sällström 29'

Gamla Ullevi, Gothenburg
Referee: Esther Staubli (Switzerland)
25 November 2021
20:00 (19:00 GMT)

Republic of Ireland	1–1	Slovakia
McCabe 65'	Report (FIFA); Report (UEFA)	Šurnovská 47'

Tallaght Stadium, Dublin
Referee: Jelena Cvetković (Serbia)

30 November 2021
19:00

Sweden	3–0	Slovakia
Hurtig 19'; Rolfö 59'; Ilestedt 69'	Report (FIFA); Report (UEFA)

Eleda Stadion, Malmö
Referee: Angelika Söder (Germany)
30 November 2021
20:00 (19:00 GMT)

Republic of Ireland	11–0	Georgia
Bebia 4' (o.g.); Carusa 21'; Lu. Quinn 37'; O'Sullivan 45+4', 58', 62'; McCabe 70' (pen.), 73'; Noonan 82'; Barrett 89'; Caldwell 90+2'	Report (FIFA); Report (UEFA)

Tallaght Stadium, Dublin
Referee: Jurgita Mačikunytė (Lithuania)

7 April 2022
18:00 (20:00 GET)

Georgia	0–15	Sweden
	Report (FIFA); Report (UEFA)	Rolfö 3'; Angeldal 8', 32', 39'; Blackstenius 15', 21'; Sembrant 18'; Ilestedt 27'; J. Andersson 29'; Hurtig 35', 42'; Blomqvist 67'; Asllani 76', 81' (pen.); Schough 90+4'

Tengiz Burjanadze Stadium, Gori
Referee: Hristiyana Guteva (Bulgaria)
8 April 2022
20:30

Slovakia	1–1	Finland
Šurnovská 16'	Report (FIFA); Report (UEFA)	Hyyrynen 6'

Anton Malatinský Stadium, Trnava
Referee: Monika Mularczyk (Poland)

12 April 2022
17:15 (18:15 EEST)

Finland	6–0	Georgia
Alanen 24'; Summanen 35' (pen.), 65'; Engman 39'; Kalandadze 55' (o.g.); Danielsson 73'	Report (FIFA); Report (UEFA)

Bolt Arena, Helsinki
Referee: Reelika Turi (Estonia)
12 April 2022
18:30

Sweden	1–1	Republic of Ireland
Asllani 79'	Report (FIFA); Report (UEFA)	McCabe 44'

Gamla Ullevi, Gothenburg
Attendance: 12,123
Referee: Iuliana Demetrescu (Romania)

27 June 2022 (Note: Following a request from the FAI, the game was rescheduled from 17 September 2021.)
18:00 (20:00 GET)

Georgia	0–9	Republic of Ireland
	Report (FIFA); Report (UEFA)	McCabe 6', 45+2', 75'; Fahey 13'; Connolly 19'; Lo. Quinn 49', 73'; Larkin 82'; D. O'Sullivan 90+3'

Tengiz Burjanadze Stadium, Gori
Referee: Melis Özçiğdem (Turkey)

1 September 2022
18:00 (20:00 GET)

Georgia	0–4	Slovakia
	Report (FIFA); Report (UEFA)	Hmírová 1'; Fischerová 17'; Šurnovská 63'; Vojteková 79'

Tengiz Burjanadze Stadium, Gori
Referee: Viki De Cremer (Belgium)
1 September 2022
20:00 (19:00 IST)

Republic of Ireland	1–0	Finland
Agg 54'	Report (FIFA); Report (UEFA)

Tallaght Stadium, Dublin
Referee: Stéphanie Frappart (France)

6 September 2022
18:00 (19:00 EEST)

Finland	0–5	Sweden
	Report (FIFA); Report (UEFA)	Blackstenius 17'; Hurtig 29'; Sembrant 63'; Blomqvist 68'; Rolfö 90+2'

Tampere Stadium, Tampere
Referee: Ivana Martinčić (Croatia)
6 September 2022
18:00

Slovakia	0–1	Republic of Ireland
	Report (FIFA); Report (UEFA)	O'Sullivan 37'

NTC Senec, Senec
Referee: María Martínez (Spain)

== Goalscorers ==
There were 81 goals scored in 20 matches, for an average of 4.05 goals per match.

7 goals

- (Republic of Ireland) Katie McCabe

6 goals

- (Republic of Ireland) Denise O'Sullivan

5 goals

- (Sweden) Lina Hurtig
- (Sweden) Fridolina Rolfö

4 goals

- (Slovakia) Martina Šurnovská
- (Sweden) Filippa Angeldahl

3 goals

- (Finland) Adelina Engman
- (Sweden) Kosovare Asllani
- (Sweden) Stina Blackstenius

2 goals

- (Finland) Emmi Alanen
- (Finland) Linda Sällström
- (Finland) Eveliina Summanen
- (Republic of Ireland) Megan Connolly
- (Republic of Ireland) Louise Quinn
- (Slovakia) Mária Mikolajová
- (Sweden) Rebecka Blomqvist
- (Sweden) Amanda Ilestedt
- (Sweden) Caroline Seger
- (Sweden) Linda Sembrant

1 goal

- (Finland) Jenny Danielsson
- (Finland) Sanni Franssi
- (Finland) Tuija Hyyrynen
- (Finland) Ria Öling
- (Republic of Ireland) Lily Agg
- (Republic of Ireland) Amber Barrett
- (Republic of Ireland) Diane Caldwell
- (Republic of Ireland) Kyra Carusa
- (Republic of Ireland) Niamh Fahey
- (Republic of Ireland) Abbie Larkin
- (Republic of Ireland) Saoirse Noonan
- (Republic of Ireland) Lucy Quinn
- (Slovakia) Patrícia Fischerová
- (Slovakia) Patrícia Hmírová
- (Slovakia) Jana Vojteková
- (Sweden) Jonna Andersson
- (Sweden) Magdalena Eriksson
- (Sweden) Olivia Schough

1 own goal

- (Georgia (country)) Maiko Bebia (against Republic of Ireland)
- (Georgia (country)) Mariam Kalandadze (against Finland)
- (Republic of Ireland) Louise Quinn (against Sweden)
