= 2023 FIFA Women's World Cup qualification (UEFA) =

Tournament details
- Dates: 16 September 2021 – 11 October 2022
- Teams: 51 (from 1 confederation)

Tournament statistics
- Matches played: 242
- Goals scored: 1,086 (4.49 per match)
- Top scorer: (Belgium) Tessa Wullaert (17 goals)

The European qualifying competition for the 2023 FIFA Women's World Cup was a women's football competition that determined the eleven UEFA teams which directly qualified for the final tournament in Australia and New Zealand, and the one team which advanced to the inter-confederation play-offs.

Fifty-one of the 55 UEFA member national teams entered the qualifying competition, with Cyprus making their World Cup qualifying debut and Luxembourg appearing in a group stage for the first time ever.

== Format ==
The qualifying competition consists of two rounds:

- Group stage: The 51 teams were drawn into nine groups of five or six teams, where each group was played in a home-and-away round-robin format. The nine group winners qualified directly for the final tournament, while the nine runners-up advanced to the play-offs.
- Play-offs: The nine teams played two knockout rounds of single-leg matches, with the best three runners-up entering in the second round, to determine the two additional qualified teams and one inter-continental play-offs entrant from UEFA, based on combined records in both the group stage and play-offs.

=== Tiebreakers ===
In the group stage, teams were ranked according to points (3 points for a win, 1 point for a draw, 0 points for a loss), and if tied on points, the following tiebreaking criteria were applied, in the order given, to determine the rankings (Regulations Article 13.01):

1. Points in head-to-head matches among tied teams;
2. Goal difference in head-to-head matches among tied teams;
3. Goals scored in head-to-head matches among tied teams;
4. If more than two teams were tied, and after applying all head-to-head criteria above, a subset of teams was still tied, all head-to-head criteria above were reapplied exclusively to this subset of teams;
5. Goal difference in all group matches;
6. Goals scored in all group matches;
7. Away goals scored in all group matches;
8. Wins in all group matches;
9. Away wins in all group matches;
10. Disciplinary points (red card = 3 points, yellow card = 1 point, expulsion for two yellow cards in one match = 3 points);
11. UEFA coefficient for the group stage draw.

To determine the best three runners-up, the group standings were used, not taking into account any matches against sixth-placed teams. If teams were tied on points, the following tiebreaking criteria were applied (Regulations Article 14.04):

1. Goal difference in all group matches;
2. Goals scored in all group matches;
3. Away goals scored in all group matches;
4. Wins in all group matches;
5. Away wins in all group matches;
6. Disciplinary points (red card = 3 points, yellow card = 1 point, expulsion for two yellow cards in one match = 3 points);
7. UEFA coefficient for the group stage draw.

In the play-offs, the team that scored more goals in the second round match qualified for the final tournament. If the score was level, extra time was played. If the score remained level after extra time, the tie was decided by penalty shoot-out (Regulations Article 15.01).

To determine the two best play-off winners, the results of the group stage as used for runner-up determination above (eight matches), and the second round of the play-offs (one match) were added. The following criteria were applied (Regulations Article 14.05):

1. Points;
2. Goal difference;
3. Goals scored;
4. Away goals scored;
5. Wins;
6. Away wins;
7. Disciplinary points;
8. UEFA coefficient for the group stage draw.

== Schedule ==
The qualifying matches were played on dates that fell within the FIFA Women's International Match Calendar.

Stage	FIFA international dates
Group stage	13–21 September 2021
Group stage	18–26 October 2021
Group stage	22–30 November 2021
Group stage	4–12 April 2022
Group stage	20–28 June 2022
Group stage	1–6 September 2022
Play-offs	3–11 October 2022

Since the UEFA Women's Euro 2022 tournament was moved from summer 2021 to that of 2022 because of the COVID-19 pandemic in Europe, for the first time the series of matches for UEFA's World Cup qualification were interrupted by a continental championship. In July 2022 sixteen UEFA national teams participated in the Women's Euro tournament in England.

== Entrants ==
The teams were ranked according to their coefficient ranking, calculated based on the following (Regulations Annex B.1.2.a):

- UEFA Women's Euro 2017 final tournament and qualifying competition (20%)
- 2019 FIFA Women's World Cup final tournament and qualifying competition (40%)
- UEFA Women's Euro 2022 qualifying competition (group stage only, excluding play-offs) (40%)

One entrant, Russia, was initially given a four-year ban from all major sporting events by the World Anti-Doping Agency (WADA) on 9 December 2019 after Russian Anti-Doping Agency (RUSADA) was found non-compliant for handing over manipulated laboratory data to investigators. However, the Russian women's team could still have entered qualification. The decision was appealed to the Court of Arbitration for Sport (CAS), which ruled in WADA's favour but reduced the ban to two years. The CAS ruling also allowed the name "Russia" to be displayed on uniforms if the words "Neutral Athlete" or "Neutral Team" had equal prominence. Had Russia qualified for the tournament, its female players would have been able to use their country's name, flag and anthem at the Women's World Cup, unlike their male counterparts, as the ban was set to expire on 16 December 2022. However, Russia were suspended from the tournament following the 2022 Russian invasion of Ukraine, and later expelled from all ongoing FIFA and UEFA competitions.

On 20 April 2021, it was announced 51 teams from the 55 eligible would enter the qualifying round.

National teams which qualified directly for the final tournament were indicated in bold, national teams which qualified for the final tournament through the UEFA play-offs were indicated in bold italics, and the national team which qualified for the inter-confederation play-offs was indicated in italics.

Pot 1
Team	Coeff	Rank
Netherlands	43,961	1
Germany	41,924	2
England	41,443	3
France	40,898	4
Sweden	39,714	5
Spain	38,913	6
Norway	38,758	7
Italy	36,399	8
Denmark	35,265	9

Pot 4
Team	Coeff	Rank
Slovakia	17,951	28
Hungary	16,676	29
Belarus	16,540	30
Croatia	15,988	31
Greece	13,602	32
Albania	13,292	33
North Macedonia	12,730	34
Israel	12,518	35
Azerbaijan	11,688	36

Pot 2
Team	Coeff	Rank
Belgium	34,951	10
**Switzerland**	34,066	11
Austria	33,693	12
Iceland	33,458	13
Scotland	30,700	14
Russia	30,117	15
Finland	29,765	16
Portugal	28,937	17
Wales	28,677	18

Pot 5
Team	Coeff	Rank
Turkey	11,526	37
Malta	11,480	38
Kosovo	10,489	39
Kazakhstan	10,198	40
Moldova	9,510	41
Cyprus	7,688	42
Faroe Islands	7,478	43
Georgia	7,085	44
Latvia	6,977	45

Pot 3
Team	Coeff	Rank
Czech Republic	28,115	19
Ukraine	27,127	20
**Republic of Ireland**	25,414	21
Poland	25,302	22
Slovenia	22,582	23
Romania	22,156	24
Serbia	21,889	25
Bosnia and Herzegovina	20,479	26
Northern Ireland	19,526	27

Pot 6
Team	Coeff	Rank
Montenegro	6,772	46
Lithuania	6,359	47
Estonia	6,108	48
Luxembourg	2,779	49
Armenia	0	—
Bulgaria	0	—

Did not enter
Team	Coeff	Rank
Andorra	1,903	50
Gibraltar	0	—
Liechtenstein	0	—
San Marino	0	—

== Group stage ==
=== Draw ===
The draw for the group stage was held on 30 April 2021 at the UEFA headquarters in Nyon, Switzerland. The 51 teams were drawn into 9 groups:

- 3 groups (Groups A, B, C) of 5 teams (playing a total of 8 matches), containing one team each from Pots 1–5.
- 6 groups (Groups D, E, F, G, H, I) of 6 teams (playing a total of 10 matches), containing one team each from Pots 1–6.

Based on the UEFA Executive Committee decisions due to political conflicts, there were several combinations of teams (Armenia and Azerbaijan, Russia and Ukraine, Serbia and Kosovo, Bosnia and Herzegovina and Kosovo, Russia and Kosovo) that could not be drawn into the same group. One of these was Armenia, who were initially drawn into group E together with Azerbaijan. Armenia was moved into group F and Montenegro was then drawn into group E.

=== Groups ===
The nine group winners qualify directly for the 2023 FIFA Women's World Cup.
The nine group runners-up advance to the play-offs.

==== Group A ====
Pos	Team	Pld	W	D	L	GF	GA	GD	Pts	Qualification	(Sweden)	(Republic of Ireland)	(Finland)	(Slovakia)	(Georgia (country))
1	Sweden	8	7	1	0	32	2	+30	22	2023 FIFA Women's World Cup	—	1–1	2–1	3–0	4–0
2	Republic of Ireland	8	5	2	1	26	4	+22	17	Play-offs	0–1	—	1–0	1–1	11–0
3	Finland	8	3	1	4	14	12	+2	10		0–5	1–2	—	2–1	6–0
4	Slovakia	8	2	2	4	9	9	0	8		0–1	0–1	1–1	—	2–0
5	Georgia	8	0	0	8	0	54	−54	0		0–15	0–9	0–3	0–4	—

Source: UEFA

==== Group B ====
Pos	Team	Pld	W	D	L	GF	GA	GD	Pts	Qualification	(Spain)	(Scotland)	(Ukraine)	(Hungary)	(Faroe Islands)
1	Spain	8	8	0	0	53	0	+53	24	2023 FIFA Women's World Cup	—	8–0	5–0	3–0	12–0
2	Scotland	8	5	1	2	22	13	+9	16	Play-offs	0–2	—	1–1	2–1	7–1
3	Ukraine	8	3	1	4	12	20	−8	10		0–6	0–4	—	2–0	4–0
4	Hungary	8	3	0	5	19	19	0	9		0–7	0–2	4–2	—	7–0
5	Faroe Islands	8	0	0	8	2	56	−54	0		0–10	0–6	0–3	1–7	—

Source: UEFA

==== Group C ====
Pos	Team	Pld	W	D	L	GF	GA	GD	Pts	Qualification	(Netherlands)	(Iceland)	(Czech Republic)	(Belarus)	(Cyprus)
1	Netherlands	8	6	2	0	31	3	+28	20	2023 FIFA Women's World Cup	—	1–0	1–1	3–0	12–0
2	Iceland	8	6	0	2	25	3	+22	18	Play-offs	0–2	—	4–0	6–0	5–0
3	Czech Republic	8	3	2	3	25	10	+15	11		2–2	0–1	—	7–0	8–0
4	Belarus	8	2	1	5	7	26	−19	7		0–2	0–5	2–1	—	4–1
5	Cyprus	8	0	1	7	2	48	−46	1		0–8	0–4	0–6	1–1	—

Source: UEFA

==== Group D ====
Pos	Team	Pld	W	D	L	GF	GA	GD	Pts	Qualification	(England)	(Austria)	(Northern Ireland)	(Luxembourg)	(North Macedonia)	(Latvia)
1	England	10	10	0	0	80	0	+80	30	2023 FIFA Women's World Cup	—	1–0	4–0	10–0	8–0	20–0
2	Austria	10	7	1	2	50	7	+43	22	Play-offs	0–2	—	3–1	5–0	10–0	8–0
3	Northern Ireland	10	6	1	3	36	16	+20	19		0–5	2–2	—	4–0	9–0	4–0
4	Luxembourg	10	3	0	7	9	45	−36	9		0–10	0–8	1–2	—	2–1	3–2
5	North Macedonia	10	2	0	8	10	62	−52	6		0–10	0–6	0–11	2–3	—	3–2
6	Latvia	10	1	0	9	8	63	−55	3		0–10	1–8	1–3	1–0	1–4	—

Source: UEFA

==== Group E ====
On 28 February 2022, FIFA and UEFA announced that Russia was suspended from all competitions. On 2 May 2022, UEFA announced that Russia would no longer be allowed to take part in the competition, that their previous results were nullified, and that Group E would continue with five teams.

Pos	Team	Pld	W	D	L	GF	GA	GD	Pts	Qualification	(Denmark)	(Bosnia and Herzegovina)	(Montenegro)	(Azerbaijan)	(Malta)	(Russia)
1	Denmark	8	8	0	0	40	2	+38	24	2023 FIFA Women's World Cup	—	8–0	5–1	2–0	7–0	~~3–1~~
2	Bosnia and Herzegovina	8	3	2	3	9	17	−8	11	Play-offs	0–3	—	2–3	1–0	1–0	~~0–4~~
3	Montenegro	8	3	0	5	9	17	−8	9		1–5	0–2	—	2–0	0–2	Canc.
4	Azerbaijan	8	2	1	5	5	16	−11	7 (Note: Tied on head-to-head points (3). Head-to-head goal difference: Azerbaijan +1, Malta −1.)		0–8	1–1	1–0	—	1–2	~~0–4~~
5	Malta	8	2	1	5	6	17	−11	7		0–2	2–2	0–2	0–2	—	Canc.
6	Russia (Note: On 28 February 2022, FIFA and UEFA suspended Russian national teams from all competitions due to the Russian invasion of Ukraine. On 2 May 2022, UEFA expelled Russia and declared all of their results to be null and void.)	0	0	0	0	0	0	0	0	Disqualified	Canc.	Canc.	~~5–0~~	~~2–0~~	~~3–0~~	—

Source: UEFA

==== Group F ====
Pos	Team	Pld	W	D	L	GF	GA	GD	Pts	Qualification	(Norway)	(Belgium)	(Poland)	(Albania)	(Kosovo)	(Armenia)
1	Norway	10	9	1	0	47	2	+45	28	2023 FIFA Women's World Cup	—	4–0	2–1	5–0	5–1	10–0
2	Belgium	10	7	1	2	56	7	+49	22	Play-offs	0–1	—	4–0	7–0	7–0	19–0
3	Poland	10	6	2	2	28	9	+19	20		0–0	1–1	—	2–0	7–0	12–0
4	Albania	10	3	1	6	14	30	−16	10		0–7	0–5	1–2	—	1–1	5–0
5	Kosovo	10	2	1	7	8	35	−27	7		0–3	1–6	1–2	1–3	—	2–1
6	Armenia	10	0	0	10	1	71	−70	0		0–10	0–7	0–1	0–4	0–1	—

Source: UEFA

==== Group G ====
Pos	Team	Pld	W	D	L	GF	GA	GD	Pts	Qualification	(Italy)	(Switzerland)	(Romania)	(Croatia)	(Lithuania)	(Moldova)
1	Italy	10	9	0	1	40	2	+38	27	2023 FIFA Women's World Cup	—	1–2	2–0	3–0	7–0	3–0
2	Switzerland	10	8	1	1	44	4	+40	25	Play-offs	0–1	—	2–0	5–0	4–1	15–0
3	Romania	10	6	1	3	21	11	+10	19		0–5	1–1	—	2–0	3–0	3–0
4	Croatia	10	3	1	6	6	18	−12	10		0–5	0–2	0–1	—	0–0	4–0
5	Lithuania	10	1	2	7	7	35	−28	5		0–5	0–7	1–7	0–1	—	4–0
6	Moldova	10	0	1	9	1	49	−48	1		0–8	0–6	0–4	0–1	1–1	—

Source: UEFA

==== Group H ====
Pos	Team	Pld	W	D	L	GF	GA	GD	Pts	Qualification	(Germany)	(Portugal)	(Serbia)	(Turkey)	(Israel)	(Bulgaria)
1	Germany	10	9	0	1	47	5	+42	27	2023 FIFA Women's World Cup	—	3–0	5–1	8–0	7–0	7–0
2	Portugal	10	7	1	2	26	9	+17	22	Play-offs	1–3	—	2–1	4–0	4–0	3–0
3	Serbia	10	7	0	3	26	14	+12	21		3–2	1–2	—	2–0	4–0	3–0
4	Turkey	10	3	1	6	9	26	−17	10		0–3	1–1	2–5	—	3–2	1–0
5	Israel	10	3	0	7	7	25	−18	9		0–1	0–4	0–2	1–0	—	2–0
6	Bulgaria	10	0	0	10	1	37	−36	0		0–8	0–5	1–4	0–2	0–2	—

Source: UEFA

==== Group I ====
Pos	Team	Pld	W	D	L	GF	GA	GD	Pts	Qualification	(France)	(Wales)	(Slovenia)	(Greece)	(Estonia)	(Kazakhstan)
1	France	10	10	0	0	54	4	+50	30	2023 FIFA Women's World Cup	—	2–0	1–0	5–1	11–0	6–0
2	Wales	10	6	2	2	22	5	+17	20	Play-offs	1–2	—	0–0	5–0	4–0	6–0
3	Slovenia	10	5	3	2	21	6	+15	18		2–3	1–1	—	0–0	6–0	2–0
4	Greece	10	4	1	5	12	28	−16	13		0–10	0–1	1–4	—	3–0	3–2
5	Estonia	10	2	0	8	7	43	−36	6		0–9	0–1	0–4	1–3	—	4–2
6	Kazakhstan	10	0	0	10	4	34	−30	0		0–5	0–3	0–2	0–1	0–2	—

Source: UEFA

=== Ranking of second-placed teams ===
Since some groups had six teams and others had five, matches against the sixth-placed team in the groups with six teams were not counted.

Pos	Grp	Team	Pld	W	D	L	GF	GA	GD	Pts	Qualification
1	G	Switzerland	8	6	1	1	23	4	+19	19	Play-offs round 2
2	C	Iceland	8	6	0	2	25	3	+22	18	Play-offs round 2
3	A	Republic of Ireland	8	5	2	1	26	4	+22	17	Play-offs round 2
4	D	Austria	8	5	1	2	34	6	+28	16	Play-offs round 1
5	F	Belgium	8	5	1	2	30	7	+23	16	Play-offs round 1
6	B	Scotland	8	5	1	2	22	13	+9	16	Play-offs round 1
7	H	Portugal	8	5	1	2	18	9	+9	16	Play-offs round 1
8	I	Wales	8	4	2	2	13	5	+8	14	Play-offs round 1
9	E	Bosnia and Herzegovina	8	3	2	3	9	17	−8	11	Play-offs round 1

Source: UEFA
Rules for classification: Counting only matches against teams ranked first to fifth in the group, 1) Points; 2) Goal difference; 3) Goals scored; 4) Away goals scored; 5) Wins; 6) Away wins; 7) Lower disciplinary points total; 8) UEFA national team coefficient ranking.

== Play-offs ==
=== Draw ===
The draw took place on 9 September 2022 at 13:30 CEST. The nine teams were drawn into six ties without any seeding, with the first team drawn in each tie to be the home team of the single-leg matches.

- Round 1: The worst six runners-up will enter in round 1 and were drawn into three ties.
- Round 2: The best three runners-up will enter in round 2 and, together with the three winners of round 1, were drawn into three ties.

=== Bracket ===
Round 1
6 October 2022 – Vizela
Portugal	2
Belgium	1
6 October 2022 – Glasgow
Scotland (a.e.t.)	1
Austria	0
6 October 2022 – Cardiff
Wales (a.e.t.)	1
Bosnia and Herzegovina	0

Round 2
11 October 2022 – Paços de Ferreira
Portugal (a.e.t.)	4
Iceland	1
11 October 2022 – Glasgow
Scotland	0
Republic of Ireland	1
11 October 2022 – Zürich
Switzerland (a.e.t.)	2
Wales	1

=== Round 1 ===
The single-leg matches were played on 6 October 2022.

Team 1	Score	Team 2
Scotland	1–0 (a.e.t.)	Austria
Wales	1–0 (a.e.t.)	Bosnia and Herzegovina
Portugal	2–1	Belgium

=== Round 2 ===
The single-leg matches were played on 11 October 2022.

Team 1	Score	Team 2
Portugal	4–1 (a.e.t.)	Iceland
Scotland	0–1	Republic of Ireland
Switzerland	2–1 (a.e.t.)	Wales

=== Ranking of play-off winners ===
To rank the three play-off winners, their results in their respective groups and round 2 of the play-offs were combined. As some groups had five teams and others had six, any group matches against teams who finished sixth in their groups were discounted; also, as not all teams played in both play-off rounds, results in round 1 of play-offs were not counted either. As a result, nine matches played by each team (eight in the group stage and one in round 2 of the play-offs) were counted for the purposes of determining the ranking. The two higher-placed winners qualified for the Women's World Cup and the lowest-placed winner advanced to the inter-confederation play-offs.

Pos	Team	Pld	W	D	L	GF	GA	GD	Pts	Qualification
1	Switzerland	9	7	1	1	25	5	+20	22	2023 FIFA Women's World Cup
2	Republic of Ireland	9	6	2	1	27	4	+23	20	2023 FIFA Women's World Cup
3	Portugal	9	6	1	2	22	10	+12	19	Inter-confederation play-offs

Source: UEFA
Rules for classification: Counting only matches against teams ranked first to fifth in the group and in play-offs round 2, 1) Points; 2) Goal difference; 3) Goals scored; 4) Away goals scored; 5) Wins; 6) Away wins; 7) Lower disciplinary points total; 8) UEFA national team coefficient ranking.

== Qualified teams ==
The following twelve teams from UEFA qualified for the final tournament.

Team	Qualified as	Qualified on	Previous appearances in FIFA Women's World Cup^{1}
Sweden	Group A winners	12 April 2022	8 (1991, 1995, 1999, 2003, 2007, 2011, 2015, 2019)
Spain	Group B winners	12 April 2022	2 (2015, 2019)
Netherlands	Group C winners	6 September 2022	2 (2015, 2019)
England	Group D winners	3 September 2022	5 (1995, 2007, 2011, 2015, 2019)
Denmark	Group E winners	2 May 2022 (Note: On 2 May 2022, UEFA announced that Russia were removed from Women's World Cup qualification due to their country's invasion of Ukraine, with all their earlier results considered null and void. Denmark therefore qualified for the Women's World Cup, as no other teams could surpass them.)	4 (1991, 1995, 1999, 2007)
Norway	Group F winners	2 September 2022	8 (1991, **1995**, 1999, 2003, 2007, 2011, 2015, 2019)
Italy	Group G winners	6 September 2022	3 (1991, 1999, 2019)
Germany	Group H winners	3 September 2022	8 (1991, 1995, 1999, **2003**, **2007**, 2011, 2015, 2019)
France	Group I winners	12 April 2022	4 (2003, 2011, 2015, 2019)
Switzerland	Best play-off winners	11 October 2022	1 (2015)
Republic of Ireland	Second best play-off winners	11 October 2022	0 (debut)
Portugal	Inter-confederation play-offs Group A winners	22 February 2023	0 (debut)

^{1} Bold indicates champions for that year. Italic indicates hosts for that year.

== Top goalscorers ==
There were 1,086 goals scored in 242 matches, for an average of 4.49 goals per match.

17 goals

- (Belgium) Tessa Wullaert

15 goals

- (Germany) Lea Schüller

13 goals

- (Austria) Nicole Billa
- (Denmark) Signe Bruun
- (England) Beth Mead

11 goals

- (Spain) Amaiur Sarriegi

10 goals

- (Belgium) Tine De Caigny
- (England) Ella Toone
- (England) Ellen White
- (France) Marie-Antoinette Katoto

9 goals

- (Hungary) Fanni Vágó
- (Spain) Esther González
- (Switzerland) Coumba Sow

8 goals

- Bethany England
- (England) Georgia Stanway
- (Italy) Cristiana Girelli
- (Netherlands) Vivianne Miedema
- (Serbia) Jovana Damnjanović
- (Slovenia) Lara Prašnikar
- (Spain) Mariona Caldentey
- (Switzerland) Ana-Maria Crnogorčević

7 goals

- (Denmark) Stine Larsen
- (England) Lauren Hemp
- (Italy) Arianna Caruso
- (Italy) Valentina Giacinti
- (Netherlands) Jill Roord
- (Northern Ireland) Rachel Furness
- (Poland) Nikola Karczewska
- (Republic of Ireland) Katie McCabe

6 goals

- (Belgium) Janice Cayman
- (Norway) Lisa-Marie Karlseng Utland
- (Poland) Ewa Pajor
- (Republic of Ireland) Denise O'Sullivan
- (Switzerland) Ramona Bachmann

Source: UEFA.com

For full lists of goalscorers, see sections in each group:

- Group A
- Group B
- Group C
- Group D
- Group E
- Group F
- Group G
- Group H
- Group I
- Play-offs
