= 2023 FIFA Women's World Cup qualification – UEFA Group B =

UEFA Group B of the 2023 FIFA Women's World Cup qualification competition consists of five teams: Spain, Scotland, Ukraine, Hungary, and Faroe Islands. The composition of the nine groups in the qualifying group stage was decided by the draw held on 30 April 2021, with the teams seeded according to their coefficient ranking.

The group is played in home-and-away round-robin format between 16 September 2021 and 6 September 2022, with a pause for the Women's Euro 2022 in July. The group winners qualify for the final tournament, while the runners-up advance to the play-offs second round if they are one of the three best runners-up among all nine groups (counting results against the fifth-placed team).

== Standings ==
Pos	Team	Pld	W	D	L	GF	GA	GD	Pts	Qualification	(Spain)	(Scotland)	(Ukraine)	(Hungary)	(Faroe Islands)
1	Spain	8	8	0	0	53	0	+53	24	2023 FIFA Women's World Cup	—	8–0	5–0	3–0	12–0
2	Scotland	8	5	1	2	22	13	+9	16	Play-offs	0–2	—	1–1	2–1	7–1
3	Ukraine	8	3	1	4	12	20	−8	10		0–6	0–4	—	2–0	4–0
4	Hungary	8	3	0	5	19	19	0	9		0–7	0–2	4–2	—	7–0
5	Faroe Islands	8	0	0	8	2	56	−54	0		0–10	0–6	0–3	1–7	—

Source: UEFA
Rules for classification: Tiebreakers

== Matches ==
Times are CET/CEST, (Note: CEST (UTC+2) for dates between 28 March and 31 October 2021 and between 27 March and 30 October 2022, and CET (UTC+1) for all other dates.) as listed by UEFA (local times, if different, are in parentheses).

16 September 2021
19:00 (18:00 WEST)

Faroe Islands	0–10	Spain
	Report (FIFA); Report (UEFA)	Sarriegi 7', 32', 55', 60'; Guerrero 8'; Putellas 50'; L. García 58'; Guijarro 64'; Caldentey 70'; Aleixandri 90+5'

Tórsvøllur, Tórshavn
Referee: Paula Brady (Republic of Ireland)
17 September 2021
20:00

Hungary	0–2	Scotland
	Report (FIFA); Report (UEFA)	Cuthbert 17'; Thomas 73'

Hidegkuti Nándor Stadion, Budapest
Referee: Frida Nielsen (Denmark)

21 September 2021
20:00

Hungary	0–7	Spain
	Report (FIFA); Report (UEFA)	González 8', 21'; Caldentey 23', 90+3'; del Castillo 50'; Sarriegi 79', 86'

Hidegkuti Nándor Stadion, Budapest
Referee: Sabina Bolić (Croatia)
21 September 2021
20:35 (19:35 BST)

Scotland	7–1	Faroe Islands
Cuthbert 19'; Arthur 21', 28'; Grimshaw 39'; Thomas 62'; Clark 81'; Emslie 84'	Report (FIFA); Report (UEFA)	Biskopstø 49'

Hampden Park, Glasgow
Attendance: 4,513
Referee: Jelena Cvetković (Serbia)

21 October 2021
18:00 (19:00 EEST)

Ukraine	4–0	Faroe Islands
Kozlova 16'; Kravchuk 45'; Boychenko 57'; Korsun 79'	Report (FIFA); Report (UEFA)

Kolos Stadium, Kovalivka
Referee: Tatyana Sorokopudova (Kazakhstan)
22 October 2021
20:35 (19:35 BST)

Scotland	2–1	Hungary
Grimshaw 42'; Corsie 90'	Report (FIFA); Report (UEFA)	Vágó 56'

Hampden Park, Glasgow
Referee: Maria Sole Caputi (Italy)

26 October 2021
16:00 (17:00 EEST)

Ukraine	0–6	Spain
	Report (FIFA); Report (UEFA)	Putellas 9'; Sarriegi 33', 82'; Eizaguirre 68'; Apanaschenko 84' (o.g.); Redondo 90+2'

Kolos Stadium, Kovalivka
Referee: Galiya Echeva (Bulgaria)
26 October 2021
19:00 (18:00 WET)

Faroe Islands	1–7	Hungary
Lisberg 8'	Report (FIFA); Report (UEFA)	Vágó 22', 28', 49'; Zeller 30', 43'; Fenyvesi 32'; Zágor 81'

Tórsvøllur, Tórshavn
Referee: Minka Vekkeli (Finland)

25 November 2021
21:00

Spain	12–0	Faroe Islands
González 2', 41', 51', 74'; Bonmatí 17', 50'; Redondo 25'; Caldentey 39' (pen.), 52', 57'; Putellas 83'; Sarriegi 89'	Report (FIFA); Report (UEFA)

Estadio de La Cartuja, Seville
Attendance: 774
Referee: Triinu Laos (Estonia)
26 November 2021
20:35 (19:35 GMT)

Scotland	1–1	Ukraine
Harrison 90+3'	Report (FIFA); Report (UEFA)	Kravchuk 22'

Hampden Park, Glasgow
Referee: Sabina Bolić (Croatia)

30 November 2021
18:00

Hungary	4–2	Ukraine
Vágó 4', 11'; Zeller 30'; Apanaschenko 87' (o.g.)	Report (FIFA); Report (UEFA)	Apanaschenko 71'; Khimich 82'

Várkerti Stadion, Kisvárda
Referee: Paula Brady (Republic of Ireland)
30 November 2021
21:00

Spain	8–0	Scotland
Sarriegi 20', 58'; Caldentey 33', 83'; Bonmatí 41', 61'; Putellas 64'; Hermoso 80'	Report (FIFA); Report (UEFA)

Estadio de La Cartuja, Seville
Referee: Lina Lehtovaara (Finland)

8 April 2022
17:30

Hungary	7–0	Faroe Islands
Zágor 12'; Csiszár 13'; Vágó 15', 19', 55'; Fenyvesi 23'; Csiki 32'	Report (FIFA); Report (UEFA)

Szusza Ferenc Stadion, Budapest
Referee: Melis Özçiğdem (Turkey)

12 April 2022
20:35 (19:35 BST)

Scotland	0–2	Spain
	Report (FIFA); Report (UEFA)	Hermoso 14' (pen.), 78'

Hampden Park, Glasgow
Referee: Esther Staubli (Switzerland)

24 June 2022
20:15

Ukraine	0–4	Scotland
	Report (FIFA); Report (UEFA)	Weir 9' (pen.); Cuthbert 17'; Thomas 20', 43'

Stadion Miejski w Rzeszowie, Rzeszów (Poland)
Referee: Triinu Laos (Estonia)

28 June 2022
20:00

Ukraine	2–0	Hungary
Kravets 27'; Ovdiychuk 90'	Report (FIFA); Report (UEFA)

Stadion Miejski w Rzeszowie, Rzeszów (Poland)
Referee: Fatemeh Zangeneh (Norway)

2 September 2022
19:00 (18:00 WEST)

Faroe Islands	0–3	Ukraine
	Report (FIFA); Report (UEFA)	Kunina 12', 14'; Shmatko 83'

Tórsvøllur, Tórshavn
Referee: Louise Thompson (Northern Ireland)
2 September 2022
21:00

Spain	3–0	Hungary
González 24'; Paredes 27'; Guijarro 74'	Report (FIFA); Report (UEFA)

La Ciudad del Fútbol, Las Rozas de Madrid
Referee: Ivana Projkovska (North Macedonia)

6 September 2022
19:00 (18:00 WEST)

Faroe Islands	0–6	Scotland
	Report (FIFA); Report (UEFA)	Docherty 17'; Weir 40'; Cuthbert 45'; Thomas 45+1'; Corsie 53'; Beattie 68'

Tórsvøllur, Tórshavn
Referee: Katarzyna Lisiecka-sek (Poland)
6 September 2022
21:00

Spain	5–0	Ukraine
González 15', 42'; Redondo 29', 39'; Hermoso 67' (pen.)	Report (FIFA); Report (UEFA)

La Ciudad del Fútbol, Las Rozas de Madrid
Referee: Jelena Cvetković (Serbia)

== Goalscorers ==
There were 108 goals scored in 20 matches, for an average of 5.4 goals per match.

11 goals

- (Spain) Amaiur Sarriegi

9 goals

- (Hungary) Fanny Vágó
- (Spain) Esther González

8 goals

- (Spain) Mariona Caldentey

5 goals

- (Scotland) Martha Thomas

4 goals

- (Scotland) Erin Cuthbert
- (Spain) Aitana Bonmatí
- (Spain) Jennifer Hermoso
- (Spain) Alexia Putellas
- (Spain) Alba Redondo

3 goals

- (Hungary) Dóra Zeller

2 goals

- (Hungary) Evelin Fenyvesi
- (Hungary) Bernadett Zágor
- (Scotland) Chloe Arthur
- (Scotland) Rachel Corsie
- (Scotland) Christy Grimshaw
- (Scotland) Caroline Weir
- (Spain) Patricia Guijarro
- (Ukraine) Roksolana Kravchuk
- (Ukraine) Nadiia Kunina

1 goal

- (Faroe Islands) Maria Biskopstø
- (Faroe Islands) Lea Lisberg
- (Hungary) Anna Csiki
- (Hungary) Henrietta Csiszár
- (Scotland) Jen Beattie
- (Scotland) Jenna Clark
- (Scotland) Nicola Docherty
- (Scotland) Claire Emslie
- (Scotland) Abi Harrison
- (Spain) Laia Aleixandri
- (Spain) Athenea del Castillo
- (Spain) Nerea Eizagirre
- (Spain) Lucía García
- (Spain) Irene Guerrero
- (Spain) Irene Paredes
- (Ukraine) Daryna Apanashchenko
- (Ukraine) Olha Boychenko
- (Ukraine) Tamila Khimich
- (Ukraine) Kateryna Korsun
- (Ukraine) Nicole Kozlova
- (Ukraine) Darya Kravets
- (Ukraine) Olha Ovdiychuk
- (Ukraine) Lyubov Shmatko

2 own goals

- (Ukraine) Daryna Apanashchenko (against Spain and Hungary)
