= Amaiur Sarriegi =

Spanish footballer (born 2000)

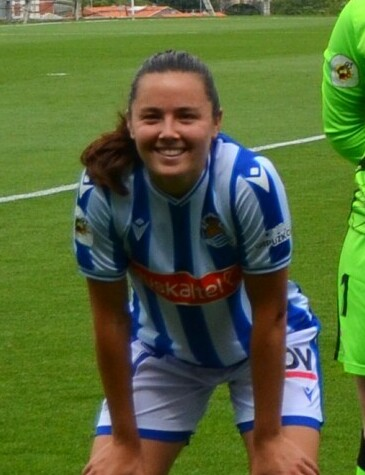
- Sarriegi with Real Sociedad in 2021

Personal information
- Full name: Amaiur Sarriegi Isasa
- Date of birth: 13 December 2000 (age 25)
- Place of birth: San Sebastián, Spain
- Height: 1.69 m (5 ft 7 in)
- Position: Forward

Team information
- Current team: Juventus
- Number: 77

Youth career
- Añorga

Senior career*
Years	Team	Apps	(Gls)
2015–2017	Añorga		
2017–2020	Athletic Club B	52	(35)
2019–2020	Athletic Club	4	(0)
2020–2025	Real Sociedad	137	(53)
2025–2026	Atlético Madrid	28	(6)
2026–	Juventus	2	(0)

International career^{‡}
2021–	Spain	20	(13)
2022–	Basque Country	1	(1)
- * Club domestic league appearances and goals as of 21:37, 13 October 2026 (UTC) ‡ National team caps and goals as of 21:37, 13 October 2026 (UTC)

Amaiur Sarriegi Isasa (born 13 December 2000) is a Spanish professional footballer who plays as a forward for Italian club Juventus and the Spain national team.

== Club career ==
=== Añorga ===
Amaiur began playing in one of the most prominent women's soccer teams in the lower categories of her native Basque Country, Añorga KKE. After different stages and an outstanding performance in the cadet category, she made the jump to the B-team. Her progression continued to be good and she managed to debut with the Añorga first team in the regionalised Segunda División in the 2015–16 season.

=== Athletic Club ===
In the summer of 2017 she signed for Athletic Club and was assigned to their B-team, also competing in the second tier, where she remained for three years with a consistent scoring return of more than 10 goals in each of the seasons played with the reserves.

In the 2019–20 Segunda División, Sarriegi represented and finished the season as the team's top scorer with 13 goals as they won their regional group. That season she made her debut with the first team in the Primera División on 19 October 2019 against Real Betis.

=== Real Sociedad ===
The following season, she joined hometown club Real Sociedad and finished the 2020–21 Primera División season with 13 goals in 26 games.

Sarriegi was named as one of Real Sociedad's captains for the 2021–22 season. In addition to becoming one of the faces of the team thanks to her contract renewal until 2025, she was awarded the number "7" shirt and is considered one of the club's most important players. She responded to the club's confidence in her by registering her best season to date, both individually with 17 goals and 9 assists in the top division, and at a collective level - the club achieved second place in the league standings and qualified for the Champions League for the first time.

=== Juventus ===
On 15 September 2026, Amaiur joined Serie A club Juventus on a three-year contract until 30 June 2029.

== International career ==
Having never been called up at any youth level, Sarriegi made her debut for the Spain national team on 10 June 2021, coming on as a substitute for Marta Cardona against Belgium. On 16 September 2021, in her first start for Spain, Sarriegi scored four goals in a 2023 FIFA World Cup qualifying match against the Faroe Islands.

She was one of Las 15, a group of players who made themselves unavailable for international selection in September 2022 due to their dissatisfaction with head coach Jorge Vilda, and among the dozen who were not involved 11 months later as Spain won the World Cup.

She has also been selected for the unofficial Basque Country women's national football team which plays only occasionally, making her first appearance in December 2022 against Chile and scoring once.

== Personal life ==
Her older brothers Imanol and Oier are also footballers, mainly in Spain's lower divisions.

== Career statistics ==
=== International ===
Scores and results list Spain's goal tally first, score column indicates score after each Sarriegi goal.

List of Spain international goals scored by Amaiur Sarriegi
No.	Date	Venue	Opponent	Score	Result	Competition
1	16 September 2021	Tórsvøllur, Tórshavn, Faroe Islands	Faroe Islands	1–0	10–1	2023 FIFA Women's World Cup qualification
2	16 September 2021	Tórsvøllur, Tórshavn, Faroe Islands	Faroe Islands	3–0	10–1	2023 FIFA Women's World Cup qualification
3	16 September 2021	Tórsvøllur, Tórshavn, Faroe Islands	Faroe Islands	5–0	10–1	2023 FIFA Women's World Cup qualification
4	16 September 2021	Tórsvøllur, Tórshavn, Faroe Islands	Faroe Islands	7–0	10–1	2023 FIFA Women's World Cup qualification
5	21 September 2021	Hidegkuti Nándor Stadion, Budapest, Hungary	Hungary	5–0	7–0	2023 FIFA Women's World Cup qualification
6	21 September 2021	Hidegkuti Nándor Stadion, Budapest, Hungary	Hungary	6–0	7–0	2023 FIFA Women's World Cup qualification
7	21 October 2021	Estadio Príncipe Felipe, Cáceres, Spain	Morocco	2–0	3–0	Friendly
8	26 October 2021	Kolos Stadium, Kovalivka, Ukraine	Ukraine	2–0	6–0	2023 FIFA Women's World Cup qualification
9	26 October 2021	Kolos Stadium, Kovalivka, Ukraine	Ukraine	3–0	6–0	2023 FIFA Women's World Cup qualification
10	25 November 2021	La Cartuja, Seville, Spain	Faroe Islands	12–0	12–0	2023 FIFA Women's World Cup qualification
11	30 November 2021	La Cartuja, Seville, Spain	Scotland	2–0	8–0	2023 FIFA Women's World Cup qualification
12	30 November 2021	La Cartuja, Seville, Spain	Scotland	4–0	8–0	2023 FIFA Women's World Cup qualification
13	29 November 2024	Estadio Cartagonova, Cartagena, Spain	South Korea	2–0	5–0	Friendly

Scores and results list Basque Country's goal tally first, score column indicates score after each Sarriegi goal.

List of Basque Country international goals scored by Amaiur Sarriegi
No.	Date	Venue	Opponent	Score	Result	Competition
1	20 December 2022	Campo José Luis Orbegozo, San Sebastián, Spain	Chile	2–0	3–0	Friendly

== Honours ==
Individual

- Liga F Player of the Month: March 2026
