= 2023 FIFA Women's World Cup qualification – UEFA play-offs =

The UEFA play-offs of the 2023 FIFA Women's World Cup qualification competition involved the runners-up from all nine groups in the group stage.

The play-offs consisted of two rounds of single-leg ties. The two best play-off winners, the Republic of Ireland and Switzerland, qualified for the 2023 FIFA Women's World Cup, while the third winner, Portugal, advanced to the inter-confederation play-offs.

== Ranking of second-placed teams ==
Because some groups had six teams and others had five, matches against the sixth place team in each group are discounted. As a result, eight matches played by each team are counted for the purposes of determining the ranking.

Pos	Grp	Team	Pld	W	D	L	GF	GA	GD	Pts	Qualification
1	G	Switzerland	8	6	1	1	23	4	+19	19	Play-offs round 2
2	C	Iceland	8	6	0	2	25	3	+22	18	Play-offs round 2
3	A	Republic of Ireland	8	5	2	1	26	4	+22	17	Play-offs round 2
4	D	Austria	8	5	1	2	34	6	+28	16	Play-offs round 1
5	F	Belgium	8	5	1	2	30	7	+23	16	Play-offs round 1
6	B	Scotland	8	5	1	2	22	13	+9	16	Play-offs round 1
7	H	Portugal	8	5	1	2	18	9	+9	16	Play-offs round 1
8	I	Wales	8	4	2	2	13	5	+8	14	Play-offs round 1
9	E	Bosnia and Herzegovina	8	3	2	3	9	17	−8	11	Play-offs round 1

Source: UEFA
Rules for classification: Counting only matches against teams ranked first to fifth in the group, 1) Points; 2) Goal difference; 3) Goals scored; 4) Away goals scored; 5) Wins; 6) Away wins; 7) Lower disciplinary points total; 8) UEFA national team coefficient ranking.

== Draw ==
The draw took place on 9 September 2022 at 13:30 CEST. The nine teams were drawn into six ties without any seeding, with the first team drawn in each tie to be the home team of the single-leg matches.

- Round 1: The worst six runners-up will enter in round 1 and were drawn into three ties.
- Round 2: The best three runners-up will enter in round 2 and, together with the three winners of round 1, were drawn into three ties.

== Bracket ==
Round 1
6 October 2022 – Vizela
Portugal	2
Belgium	1
6 October 2022 – Glasgow
Scotland (a.e.t.)	1
Austria	0
6 October 2022 – Cardiff
Wales (a.e.t.)	1
Bosnia and Herzegovina	0

Round 2
11 October 2022 – Paços de Ferreira
Portugal (a.e.t.)	4
Iceland	1
11 October 2022 – Glasgow
Scotland	0
Republic of Ireland	1
11 October 2022 – Zürich
Switzerland (a.e.t.)	2
Wales	1

== Round 1 ==
Times are CEST (UTC+2), as listed by UEFA (local times, if different, are in parentheses).

=== Summary ===
The single-leg matches were played on 6 October 2022.

Team 1	Score	Team 2
Scotland	1–0 (a.e.t.)	Austria
Wales	1–0 (a.e.t.)	Bosnia and Herzegovina
Portugal	2–1	Belgium

=== Matches ===
6 October 2022
20:35 (19:35 BST)

Scotland	1–0 (a.e.t.)	Austria
Harrison 92'	Report (FIFA); Report (UEFA)

Hampden Park, Glasgow
Attendance: 10,182
Referee: Jana Adámková (Czech Republic)

6 October 2022
20:15 (19:15 BST)

Wales	1–0 (a.e.t.)	Bosnia and Herzegovina
Fishlock 105+2'	Report (FIFA); Report (UEFA)

Cardiff City Stadium, Cardiff
Attendance: 15,200
Referee: Marta Huerta de Aza (Spain)

6 October 2022
19:00 (18:00 WEST)

Portugal	2–1	Belgium
Di. Silva 29'; F. Pinto 89'	Report (FIFA); Report (UEFA)	Wullaert 40' (pen.)

Estádio do FC Vizela, Vizela
Attendance: 2,645
Referee: Kateryna Monzul (Ukraine)

== Round 2 ==
=== Summary ===
The single-leg matches were played on 11 October 2022.

Team 1	Score	Team 2
Portugal	4–1 (a.e.t.)	Iceland
Scotland	0–1	Republic of Ireland
Switzerland	2–1 (a.e.t.)	Wales

=== Matches ===
11 October 2022
19:00 (18:00 WEST)

Portugal	4–1 (a.e.t.)	Iceland
C. Costa 55' (pen.); Di. Silva 92'; T. Pinto 108'; Nazareth 120+1'	Report (FIFA); Report (UEFA)	Viggósdóttir 59'

Estádio da Mata Real, Paços de Ferreira
Attendance: 5,595
Referee: Stéphanie Frappart (France)

11 October 2022
21:00 (20:00 BST)

Scotland	0–1	Republic of Ireland
	Report (FIFA); Report (UEFA)	Barrett 72'

Hampden Park, Glasgow
Attendance: 10,708
Referee: Esther Staubli (Switzerland)

11 October 2022
19:00

Switzerland	2–1 (a.e.t.)	Wales
Bachmann 45'; Humm 120+1'	Report (FIFA); Report (UEFA)	Roberts 19'

Letzigrund, Zürich
Attendance: 7,803
Referee: Tess Olofsson (Sweden)

== Ranking of play-off winners ==
To rank the three play-off winners, their results in their respective groups and round 2 of the play-offs were combined. As some groups had five teams and others had six, any group matches against teams who finished sixth in their groups were discounted; also, as not all teams played in both play-off rounds, results in round 1 of play-offs were not counted either. As a result, nine matches played by each team (eight in the group stage and one in round 2 of the play-offs) were counted for the purposes of determining the ranking. The two higher-placed winners qualified for the Women's World Cup and the lowest-placed winner advanced to the inter-confederation play-offs.

Pos	Team	Pld	W	D	L	GF	GA	GD	Pts	Qualification
1	Switzerland	9	7	1	1	25	5	+20	22	2023 FIFA Women's World Cup
2	Republic of Ireland	9	6	2	1	27	4	+23	20	2023 FIFA Women's World Cup
3	Portugal	9	6	1	2	22	10	+12	19	Inter-confederation play-offs

Source: UEFA
Rules for classification: Counting only matches against teams ranked first to fifth in the group and in play-offs round 2, 1) Points; 2) Goal difference; 3) Goals scored; 4) Away goals scored; 5) Wins; 6) Away wins; 7) Lower disciplinary points total; 8) UEFA national team coefficient ranking.

== Goalscorers ==
There were 14 goals scored in 6 matches, for an average of 2.33 goals per match.

2 goals

- (Portugal) Diana Silva

1 goal

- (Belgium) Tessa Wullaert
- (Iceland) Glódís Perla Viggósdóttir
- (Portugal) Carole Costa
- (Portugal) Francisca Nazareth
- (Portugal) Fátima Pinto
- (Portugal) Tatiana Pinto
- (Republic of Ireland) Amber Barrett
- (Scotland) Abi Harrison
- (Switzerland) Ramona Bachmann
- (Switzerland) Fabienne Humm
- (Wales) Jess Fishlock
- (Wales) Rhiannon Roberts
