= 2021–22 in English football =

Football in England
- Season: 2021–22

Men's football
- Premier League: Manchester City
- Championship: Fulham
- League One: Wigan Athletic
- League Two: Forest Green Rovers
- National League: Stockport County
- FA Cup: Liverpool
- Community Shield: Leicester City
- EFL Cup: Liverpool
- EFL Trophy: Rotherham United

Women's football
- FA Women's Super League: Chelsea
- FA Women's Championship: Liverpool
- FA Women's National League: Southampton
- Women's FA Cup: Chelsea
- FA Women's League Cup: Manchester City

The 2021–22 season was the 142nd competitive association football season in England.

== National teams ==
=== England men's national football team ===
==== Results and fixtures ====
===== Friendlies =====
26 March 2022	England	2–1	Switzerland	London, England
17:30	Shaw 45+1'; Kane 78' (pen.)	Report	Embolo 22'	Stadium: Wembley Stadium; Referee: Andreas Ekberg (Sweden)

29 March 2022	England	3–0	Ivory Coast	London, England
19:45	Watkins 30'; Sterling 45'; Mings 90+3'	Report		Stadium: Wembley Stadium; Referee: Erik Lambrechts (Belgium)

===== FIFA World Cup qualification =====
====== UEFA Group I ======
Pos	Team	Pld	W	D	L	GF	GA	GD	Pts	Qualification	England	Poland	Albania	Hungary	Andorra	San Marino
1	England	10	8	2	0	39	3	+36	26	Qualification for 2022 FIFA World Cup	—	2–1	5–0	1–1	4–0	5–0
2	Poland	10	6	2	2	30	11	+19	20	Advance to play-offs	1–1	—	4–1	1–2	3–0	5–0
3	Albania	10	6	0	4	12	12	0	18		0–2	0–1	—	1–0	1–0	5–0
4	Hungary	10	5	2	3	19	13	+6	17		0–4	3–3	0–1	—	2–1	4–0
5	Andorra	10	2	0	8	8	24	−16	6		0–5	1–4	0–1	1–4	—	2–0
6	San Marino	10	0	0	10	1	46	−45	0		0–10	1–7	0–2	0–3	0–3	—

Source: FIFA, UEFA
Rules for classification: Tiebreakers

2 September	Hungary	0–4	England	Budapest, Hungary
20:45 CEST		Report	Sterling 55'; Kane 63'; Maguire 69'; Rice 87'	Stadium: Puskás Aréna; Referee: Cüneyt Çakır (Turkey)

5 September	England	4–0	Andorra	London, England
19:45 BST	Lingard 18', 78'; Kane 72' (pen.); Saka 85'	Report		Stadium: Wembley Stadium; Referee: Anastasios Papapetrou (Greece)

8 September	Poland	1–1	England	Warsaw, Poland
20:45 CEST	Szymański 90+2'	Report	Kane 72'	Stadium: PGE Narodowy; Referee: Daniel Siebert (Germany)

9 October	Andorra	0–5	England	Andorra la Vella, Andorra
20:45 CEST		Report	Chilwell 17'; Saka 40'; Abraham 59'; Ward-Prowse 79'; Grealish 86'	Stadium: Estadi Nacional; Referee: Kateryna Monzul (Ukraine)

12 October	England	1–1	Hungary	London, England
19:45 BST	Stones 37'	Report	Sallai 24' (pen.)	Stadium: Wembley Stadium; Referee: Alejandro Hernández (Spain)

12 November	England	5–0	Albania	London, England
19:45 GMT	Maguire 9'; Kane 18', 33', 45+2'; Henderson 28'	Report		Stadium: Wembley Stadium; Attendance: 80,366; Referee: Ruddy Buquet (France)

15 November	San Marino	0–10	England	Serravalle, San Marino
20:45 CET		Report	Maguire 6'; Fabbri 15' (o.g.); Kane 27' (pen.), 32', 39' (pen.), 42'; Smith Rowe 58'; Mings 69'; Abraham 78'; Saka 80'	Stadium: Stadio Olimpico de Serravalle; Attendance: 2,775; Referee: Rade Obrenovič (Slovenia)

===== UEFA Euro 2020 =====
====== Knockout phase ======
3 July 2021 QF	Ukraine	0–4	England	Rome, Italy
21:00 CEST		Report	Kane 4', 50'; Maguire 46'; J. Henderson 63'	Stadium: Stadio Olimpico; Attendance: 11,880; Referee: Felix Brych (Germany)

7 July 2021 SF	England	2–1 (a.e.t.)	Denmark	London, England
20:00 BST	Kjær 39' (o.g.); Kane 104'	Report	Damsgaard 30'	Stadium: Wembley Stadium; Attendance: 64,950; Referee: Danny Makkelie (Netherlands)

====== Final ======
11 July 2021
21:00 (20:00 UTC+1)

Italy	1–1 (a.e.t.)	England
Bonucci 67'	Report	Shaw 2'
Penalties
Berardi (penalty scored); Belotti (penalty missed); Bonucci (penalty scored); Bernardeschi (penalty scored); Jorginho (penalty missed)	3–2	(penalty scored) Kane; (penalty scored) Maguire; (penalty missed) Rashford; (penalty missed) Sancho; (penalty missed) Saka

Wembley Stadium, London
Attendance: 67,173
Referee: Björn Kuipers (Netherlands)

===== UEFA Nations League =====
====== Group 3 ======
Pos	Team	Pld	W	D	L	GF	GA	GD	Pts	Qualification or relegation	(Italy)	(Hungary)	(Germany)	(England)
1	Italy	6	3	2	1	8	7	+1	11	Qualification for Nations League Finals	—	2–1	1–1	1–0
2	Hungary	6	3	1	2	8	5	+3	10		0–2	—	1–1	1–0
3	Germany	6	1	4	1	11	9	+2	7		5–2	0–1	—	1–1
4	England (R)	6	0	3	3	4	10	−6	3	Relegation to League B	0–0	0–4	3–3	—

Source: UEFA
(R) Relegated

4 June 2022	Hungary	1–0	England	Budapest, Hungary
18:00	Szoboszlai 66' (pen.)	Report		Stadium: Puskás Aréna; Attendance: 26,935; Referee: Artur Soares Dias (Portugal)

7 June 2022	Germany	1–1	England	Munich, Germany
20:45	Hofmann 50'	Report	Kane 88' (pen.)	Stadium: Allianz Arena; Attendance: 66,289; Referee: Carlos del Cerro Grande (Spain)

11 June 2022	England	0–0	Italy	Wolverhampton, England
20:45 (19:45 UTC+1)		Report		Stadium: Molineux Stadium; Attendance: 1,782; Referee: Szymon Marciniak (Poland)

14 June 2022	England	0–4	Hungary	Wolverhampton, England
20:45 (19:45 UTC+1)		Report	Sallai 16', 70'; Z. Nagy 80'; Gazdag 89'	Stadium: Molineux Stadium; Attendance: 28,839; Referee: Clément Turpin (France)

=== England women's national football team ===
==== Results and fixtures ====
===== Friendlies =====
16 June 2022	England	3–0	Belgium	Wolverhampton, England
20:00	Kelly 62'; Daly 66'; Evrard 83' (o.g.)	Report		Stadium: Molineux Stadium; Attendance: 9,598; Referee: Sara Persson (Sweden)

24 June 2022	England	5–1	Netherlands	Leeds, England
20:00	Bronze 32'; Greenwood (yellow card) 51'; Mead 53', 90'; Toone 72'; Hemp 74'	Report	Martens 22'; Nouwen (yellow card) 29'; Beerensteyn (yellow card) 45+2'	Stadium: Elland Road; Attendance: 19,365; Referee: Sandra Bastos (Portugal)

30 June 2022	Switzerland	0–4	England	Zürich, Switzerland
18:00 (CEST)	Calligaris (yellow card) 44'	Report	Russo (yellow card) 45+1', (goal) 56'; Stanway (yellow card) 69', (goal) 74' (pen.); England 76'; Scott 90+4'	Stadium: Letzigrund; Attendance: 10,022; Referee: Ainara Andrea Acevedo Dudley (Spain)

===== 2023 FIFA Women's World Cup qualification =====
====== Group D ======
Pos	Team	Pld	W	D	L	GF	GA	GD	Pts	Qualification	(England)	(Austria)	(Northern Ireland)	(Luxembourg)	(North Macedonia)	(Latvia)
1	England	10	10	0	0	80	0	+80	30	2023 FIFA Women's World Cup	—	1–0	4–0	10–0	8–0	20–0
2	Austria	10	7	1	2	50	7	+43	22	Play-offs	0–2	—	3–1	5–0	10–0	8–0
3	Northern Ireland	10	6	1	3	36	16	+20	19		0–5	2–2	—	4–0	9–0	4–0
4	Luxembourg	10	3	0	7	9	45	−36	9		0–10	0–8	1–2	—	2–1	3–2
5	North Macedonia	10	2	0	8	10	62	−52	6		0–10	0–6	0–11	2–3	—	3–2
6	Latvia	10	1	0	9	8	63	−55	3		0–10	1–8	1–3	1–0	1–4	—

Source: UEFA
Rules for classification: Tiebreakers

17 September 2021	England	8–0	North Macedonia	Southampton, England
	Toone 12'; White 42', 67' (pen.); Zivikj 45' (o.g.); England 77', 90'; Kolarovska 79' (o.g.); Mead 90+1'	Report		Stadium: St Mary's Stadium; Referee: María Martínez (Spain)

21 September 2021	Luxembourg	0–10	England	Luxembourg City, Luxembourg
20:15 CEST (UTC+2)	De Bruyn (yellow card) 83'	Report	White 12', 17'; Parris 27'; Greenwood 37', 47'; Berscheid 61' (o.g.); Mead (yellow card) 66'; Bright 78', 90+1'; Daly 90+3'; England 90+4'	Stadium: Stade de Luxembourg; Referee: Aleksandra Česen (Slovenia)

23 October 2021	England	4–0	Northern Ireland	London, England
	Mead 64', 74', 78'; England 72'	Report		Stadium: Wembley Stadium; Referee: Ivana Martinčić (Croatia)

26 October 2021	Latvia	0–10	England	Riga, Latvia
		Report	Toone 8', 12', 68'; White 25'; Bright 32'; Mead 55'; Daly 70', 82'; Williamson 79'; Stanway 81'	Stadium: Daugava Stadium; Referee: Katarzyna Lisiecka-Sęk (Poland)

27 November 2021	England	1–0	Austria	Sunderland, England
	White 40'	Report		Stadium: Stadium of Light; Referee: Kateryna Monzul (Ukraine)

30 November 2021	England	20–0	Latvia	Doncaster, England
	Mead 3', 12', 23'; White 6', 9', 49'; Hemp 18', 44', 76', 88'; Toone 42'; Stanway 52' (pen.); Carter 56'; England 61', 84'; Scott 67'; Russo 71', 81', 82'; Nobbs 80'	Report		Stadium: Keepmoat Stadium; Referee: Veronika Kovarova (Czech Republic)

8 April 2022	North Macedonia	0–10	England	Skopje, North Macedonia
20:00		Report	Mead 6', 12', 47', 53'; Toone 24', 74', 78'; White 42'; Stanway 45', 56'	Stadium: Toše Proeski Arena; Referee: Vivian Peeters (Netherlands)

12 April 2022	Northern Ireland	0–5	England	Belfast, Northern Ireland
20:55 (19:55 BST)		Report	Hemp 26', 60'; Toone 52'; Stanway 70', 79'	Stadium: Windsor Park; Referee: Riem Hussein (Germany)

===== 2022 Arnold Clark Cup =====
Pos	Team	Pld	W	D	L	GF	GA	GD	Pts
1	England (H, C)	3	1	2	0	4	2	+2	5
2	Spain	3	1	2	0	2	1	+1	5
3	Canada	3	1	1	1	2	2	0	4
4	Germany	3	0	1	2	2	5	−3	1

Source: BBC
Rules for classification: 1) points; 2) goal difference; 3) goals scored; 4) head-to-head result; 5) fair play ranking.
(C) Champions; (H) Hosts

17 February 2022	England	1–1	Canada	Middlesbrough, England
	Bright 22'	Report	Beckie 55'	Stadium: Riverside Stadium; Attendance: 8,769; Referee: Lina Lehtovaara (Finland)

20 February 2022	England	0–0	Spain	Norwich, England
		Report		Stadium: Carrow Road; Attendance: 14,284; Referee: Iuliana Demetrescu (Romania)

23 February 2022	England	3–1	Germany	Wolverhampton, England
	White 15'; Bright 84'; Kirby 90+4'	Report	Magull 41'	Stadium: Molineux Stadium; Attendance: 14,463; Referee: Lina Lehtovaara (Finland)

== UEFA competitions ==
=== UEFA Super Cup ===
11 August 2021
20:00 UTC+1

Chelsea (England)	1–1 (a.e.t.)	(Spain) Villarreal
Ziyech 27'	Report	Gerard 73'
Penalties
Havertz (penalty missed); Azpilicueta (penalty scored); Alonso (penalty scored); Mount (penalty scored); Jorginho (penalty scored); Pulisic (penalty scored); Rüdiger (penalty scored)	6–5	(penalty scored) Gerard; (penalty missed) Mandi; (penalty scored) Estupiñán; (penalty scored) Gómez; (penalty scored) Raba; (penalty scored) Foyth; (penalty missed) Albiol

Windsor Park, Belfast
Attendance: 10,435
Referee: Sergei Karasev (Russia)

=== UEFA Champions League ===
==== Group stage ====
===== Group A =====
Pos	Team	Pld	W	D	L	GF	GA	GD	Pts	Qualification	MCI	PAR	RBL	BRU
1	(England) Manchester City	6	4	0	2	18	10	+8	12	Advance to knockout phase	—	2–1	6–3	4–1
2	(France) Paris Saint-Germain	6	3	2	1	13	8	+5	11	Advance to knockout phase	2–0	—	3–2	4–1
3	(Germany) RB Leipzig	6	2	1	3	15	14	+1	7	Transfer to Europa League	2–1	2–2	—	1–2
4	(Belgium) Club Brugge	6	1	1	4	6	20	−14	4		1–5	1–1	0–5	—

Source: UEFA

===== Group B =====
Pos	Team	Pld	W	D	L	GF	GA	GD	Pts	Qualification	LIV	ATM	POR	MIL
1	(England) Liverpool	6	6	0	0	17	6	+11	18	Advance to knockout phase	—	2–0	2–0	3–2
2	(Spain) Atlético Madrid	6	2	1	3	7	8	−1	7	Advance to knockout phase	2–3	—	0–0	0–1
3	(Portugal) Porto	6	1	2	3	4	11	−7	5	Transfer to Europa League	1–5	1–3	—	1–0
4	(Italy) Milan	6	1	1	4	6	9	−3	4		1–2	1–2	1–1	—

Source: UEFA

===== Group F =====
Pos	Team	Pld	W	D	L	GF	GA	GD	Pts	Qualification	MUN	VIL	ATA	YB
1	(England) Manchester United	6	3	2	1	11	8	+3	11	Advance to knockout phase	—	2–1	3–2	1–1
2	(Spain) Villarreal	6	3	1	2	12	9	+3	10	Advance to knockout phase	0–2	—	2–2	2–0
3	(Italy) Atalanta	6	1	3	2	12	13	−1	6	Transfer to Europa League	2–2	2–3	—	1–0
4	(Switzerland) Young Boys	6	1	2	3	7	12	−5	5		2–1	1–4	3–3	—

Source: UEFA

===== Group H =====
Pos	Team	Pld	W	D	L	GF	GA	GD	Pts	Qualification	JUV	CHE	ZEN	MAL
1	(Italy) Juventus	6	5	0	1	10	6	+4	15	Advance to knockout phase	—	1–0	4–2	1–0
2	(England) Chelsea	6	4	1	1	13	4	+9	13	Advance to knockout phase	4–0	—	1–0	4–0
3	(Russia) Zenit Saint Petersburg	6	1	2	3	10	10	0	5	Transfer to Europa League	0–1	3–3	—	4–0
4	(Sweden) Malmö FF	6	0	1	5	1	14	−13	1		0–3	0–1	1–1	—

Source: UEFA

==== Knockout phase ====
===== Round of 16 =====
Team 1	Agg.	Team 2	1st leg	2nd leg
Sporting CP (Portugal)	0–5	(England) Manchester City	0–5	0–0
Chelsea (England)	4–1	(France) Lille	2–0	2–1
Atlético Madrid (Spain)	2–1	(England) Manchester United	1–1	1–0
Inter Milan (Italy)	1–2	(England) Liverpool	0–2	1–0

===== Quarter-finals =====
Team 1	Agg.	Team 2	1st leg	2nd leg
Chelsea (England)	4–5	(Spain) Real Madrid	1–3	3–2 (a.e.t.)
Manchester City (England)	1–0	(Spain) Atlético Madrid	1–0	0–0
Benfica (Portugal)	4–6	(England) Liverpool	1–3	3–3

===== Semi-finals =====
Team 1	Agg.	Team 2	1st leg	2nd leg
Manchester City (England)	5–6	(Spain) Real Madrid	4–3	1–3 (a.e.t.)
Liverpool (England)	5–2	(Spain) Villarreal	2–0	3–2

===== Final =====
28 May 2022
21:36 UTC+2 (Note: The final, originally scheduled for 21:00, was delayed 36 minutes due to security issues with fans entering the stadium.)

Liverpool (England)	0–1	(Spain) Real Madrid
	Report	Vinícius 59'

Stade de France, Saint-Denis
Attendance: 75,000
Referee: Clément Turpin (France)

=== UEFA Europa League ===
==== Group stage ====
===== Group C =====
Pos	Team	Pld	W	D	L	GF	GA	GD	Pts	Qualification	SPM	NAP	LEI	LEG
1	(Russia) Spartak Moscow	6	3	1	2	10	9	+1	10 (Note: Head–to–head points: Spartak Moscow 6, Napoli 0.)	Advance to round of 16	—	2–1	3–4	0–1
2	(Italy) Napoli	6	3	1	2	15	10	+5	10	Advance to knockout round play-offs	2–3	—	3–2	3–0
3	(England) Leicester City	6	2	2	2	12	11	+1	8	Transfer to Europa Conference League	1–1	2–2	—	3–1
4	(Poland) Legia Warsaw	6	2	0	4	4	11	−7	6		0–1	1–4	1–0	—

Source: UEFA

===== Group H =====
Pos	Team	Pld	W	D	L	GF	GA	GD	Pts	Qualification	WHU	DZA	RWI	GNK
1	(England) West Ham United	6	4	1	1	11	3	+8	13	Advance to round of 16	—	0–1	2–0	3–0
2	(Croatia) Dinamo Zagreb	6	3	1	2	9	6	+3	10	Advance to knockout round play-offs	0–2	—	3–1	1–1
3	(Austria) Rapid Wien	6	2	0	4	4	9	−5	6	Transfer to Europa Conference League	0–2	2–1	—	0–1
4	(Belgium) Genk	6	1	2	3	4	10	−6	5		2–2	0–3	0–1	—

Source: UEFA

==== Knockout stage ====
===== Round of 16 =====
Team 1	Agg.	Team 2	1st leg	2nd leg
Sevilla (Spain)	1–2	(England) West Ham United	1–0	0–2 (a.e.t.)

===== Quarter-finals =====
Team 1	Agg.	Team 2	1st leg	2nd leg
West Ham United (England)	4–1	(France) Lyon	1–1	3–0

===== Semi-finals =====
Team 1	Agg.	Team 2	1st leg	2nd leg
West Ham United (England)	1–3	(Germany) Eintracht Frankfurt	1–2	0–1

=== UEFA Europa Conference League ===
==== Qualifying phase and play-off round ====
===== Play-off round =====
Team 1	Agg.	Team 2	1st leg	2nd leg
Paços de Ferreira (Portugal)	1–3	(England) Tottenham Hotspur	1–0	0–3

==== Group stage ====
===== Group G =====
Pos	Team	Pld	W	D	L	GF	GA	GD	Pts	Qualification	REN	VIT	TOT	MUR
1	(France) Rennes	6	4	2	0	13	7	+6	14	Advance to round of 16	—	3–3	2–2	1–0
2	(Netherlands) Vitesse	6	3	1	2	12	9	+3	10	Advance to knockout round play-offs	1–2	—	1–0	3–1
3	(England) Tottenham Hotspur	6	2	1	3	11	11	0	7		0–3 (Note: The Tottenham Hotspur v Rennes match was awarded as a 3–0 win to Rennes due to numerous positive COVID-19 tests in the Tottenham Hotspur squad.)	3–2	—	5–1
4	(Slovenia) Mura	6	1	0	5	5	14	−9	3		1–2	0–2	2–1	—

Source: UEFA

==== Knockout stage ====
===== Knockout round play-offs =====
Team 1	Agg.	Team 2	1st leg	2nd leg
Leicester City (England)	7–2	(Denmark) Randers	4–1	3–1

===== Round of 16 =====
Team 1	Agg.	Team 2	1st leg	2nd leg
Leicester City (England)	3–2	(France) Rennes	2–0	1–2

===== Quarter-finals =====
Team 1	Agg.	Team 2	1st leg	2nd leg
Leicester City (England)	2–1	(Netherlands) PSV Eindhoven	0–0	2–1

===== Semi-finals =====
Team 1	Agg.	Team 2	1st leg	2nd leg
Leicester City (England)	1–2	(Italy) Roma	1–1	0–1

=== UEFA Youth League ===
==== UEFA Champions League Path ====
===== Group stage =====
====== Group A ======
Pos	Team	Pld	W	D	L	GF	GA	GD	Pts	Qualification	PAR	BRU	MCI	RBL
1	(France) Paris Saint-Germain	6	4	2	0	16	7	+9	14	Round of 16	—	3–2	1–1	3–0
2	(Belgium) Club Brugge	6	3	2	1	18	11	+7	11	Play-offs	2–2	—	1–1	4–1
3	(England) Manchester City	6	2	2	2	12	11	+1	8		1–3	3–5	—	5–1
4	(Germany) RB Leipzig	6	0	0	6	4	21	−17	0		1–4	1–4	0–1	—

Source: UEFA

====== Group B ======
Pos	Team	Pld	W	D	L	GF	GA	GD	Pts	Qualification	LIV	ATM	POR	MIL
1	(England) Liverpool	6	3	2	1	9	4	+5	11	Round of 16	—	2–0	4–0	1–0
2	(Spain) Atlético Madrid	6	3	1	2	9	6	+3	10 (Note: Head-to-head: Atlético Madrid 3 pts (0 GD, 3 GF), Porto 3 pts (0 GD, 3 GF). Goal difference in all group matches: Atlético Madrid +3, Porto –1.)	Play-offs	2–0	—	1–2	3–0
3	(Portugal) Porto	6	3	1	2	8	9	−1	10		1–1	1–2	—	3–1
4	(Italy) Milan	6	0	2	4	3	10	−7	2		1–1	1–1	0–1	—

Source: UEFA

====== Group F ======
Pos	Team	Pld	W	D	L	GF	GA	GD	Pts	Qualification	MUN	VIL	ATA	YB
1	(England) Manchester United	6	5	0	1	12	9	+3	15	Round of 16	—	1–4	4–2	2–1
2	(Spain) Villarreal	6	3	2	1	15	9	+6	11	Play-offs	1–2	—	2–0	3–3
3	(Italy) Atalanta	6	2	1	3	11	12	−1	7		1–2	2–2	—	3–0
4	(Switzerland) Young Boys	6	0	1	5	7	15	−8	1		0–1	1–3	2–3	—

Source: UEFA

====== Group H ======
Pos	Team	Pld	W	D	L	GF	GA	GD	Pts	Qualification	JUV	CHE	ZEN	MAL
1	(Italy) Juventus	6	5	1	0	18	7	+11	16	Round of 16	—	3–1	4–2	4–1
2	(England) Chelsea	6	3	1	2	15	10	+5	10	Play-offs	1–3	—	3–1	4–2
3	(Russia) Zenit Saint Petersburg	6	2	1	3	10	13	−3	7		0–2	1–1	—	3–2
4	(Sweden) Malmö FF	6	0	1	5	8	21	−13	1		2–2	0–5	1–3	—

Source: UEFA

==== Play-offs ====
===== Knockout round play-offs =====
Team 1	Score	Team 2
Genk (Belgium)	5–1	(England) Chelsea

===== Round of 16 =====
Team 1	Score	Team 2
Liverpool (England)	1–1 (4–3 p)	(Belgium) Genk
Manchester United (England)	2–2 (1–3 p)	(Germany) Borussia Dortmund

===== Quarter-finals =====
Team 1	Score	Team 2
Juventus (Italy)	2–0	(England) Liverpool

=== UEFA Women's Champions League ===
==== Qualifying rounds ====
===== Round 1 =====
====== Semi-finals ======
Team 1	Score	Team 2
Arsenal (England)	4–0	(Kazakhstan) Okzhetpes

====== Final ======
Team 1	Score	Team 2
Arsenal (England)	3–1	(Netherlands) PSV

===== Round 2 =====
Team 1	Agg.	Team 2	1st leg	2nd leg
Arsenal (England)	7–0	(Czech Republic) Slavia Prague	3–0	4–0
Real Madrid (Spain)	2–1	(England) Manchester City	1–1	1–0

==== Group stage ====
===== Group A =====
Pos	Team	Pld	W	D	L	GF	GA	GD	Pts	Qualification	WOL	JUV	CHE	SER
1	(Germany) VfL Wolfsburg	6	3	2	1	17	7	+10	11 (Note: Head-to-head points: Wolfsburg 5, Juventus 5, Chelsea 5. Head-to-head goal differences: Wolfsburg +2, Juventus +1, Chelsea −3.)	Advance to Quarter-finals	—	0–2	4–0	5–0
2	(Italy) Juventus	6	3	2	1	12	4	+8	11	Advance to Quarter-finals	2–2	—	1–2	4–0
3	(England) Chelsea	6	3	2	1	13	8	+5	11		3–3	0–0	—	1–0
4	(Switzerland) Servette Chênois	6	0	0	6	0	23	−23	0		0–3	0–3	0–7	—

Source: UEFA

===== Group C =====
Pos	Team	Pld	W	D	L	GF	GA	GD	Pts	Qualification	BAR	ARS	HOF	KOG
1	(Spain) Barcelona	6	6	0	0	24	1	+23	18	Advance to Quarter-finals	—	4–1	4–0	5–0
2	(England) Arsenal	6	3	0	3	14	13	+1	9 (Note: Head-to-head points: Arsenal 3, 1899 Hoffenheim 3. Head-to-head goal differences: Arsenal +1, 1899 Hoffenheim −1.)	Advance to Quarter-finals	0–4	—	4–0	3–0
3	(Germany) 1899 Hoffenheim	6	3	0	3	11	15	−4	9		0–5	4–1	—	5–0
4	(Denmark) HB Køge	6	0	0	6	2	22	−20	0		0–2	1–5	1–2	—

Source: UEFA

==== Knockout phase ====
===== Quarter-finals =====
Team 1	Agg.	Team 2	1st leg	2nd leg
Arsenal (England)	1–3	(Germany) VfL Wolfsburg	1–1	0–2

== Men's football ==
League Division	Promoted to league ▲	Relegated from league ▼	Expelled or Dissolved	Re-elected
Premier League	Norwich City ▲; Watford ▲; Brentford ▲	Fulham ▼; West Bromwich Albion ▼; Sheffield United ▼	None	None
Championship	Hull City ▲; Peterborough United ▲; Blackpool ▲	Wycombe Wanderers ▼; Rotherham United ▼; Sheffield Wednesday ▼	None	None
League One	Cheltenham Town ▲; Cambridge United ▲; Bolton Wanderers ▲; Morecambe ▲	Rochdale ▼; Northampton Town ▼; Swindon Town ▼; Bristol Rovers ▼	None	None
League Two	Sutton United ▲; Hartlepool United ▲	Southend United ▼; Grimsby Town ▼	None	None
National League	None	None	Macclesfield Town	Barnet; King's Lynn Town

=== Premier League ===
Having looked all but sewn up at the start of 2022, the title race ended up going to the final day of the season, with Liverpool and Manchester City once again battling it out – a battle that City once again came out on top of in thanks in part to a superb run of form in the closing weeks and despite a very late scare on the final day, securing manager Pep Guardiola his fourth Premier League title in six seasons. Despite falling short in their hunt for a second top-flight title since 1990, ending hopes of an unprecedented quadruple, Liverpool nevertheless managed to end the season with trophy success, winning both the League Cup and the FA Cup on penalties, whilst going unbeaten in the league at Anfield for the fourth time in five seasons, reaching their third Champions League final in five seasons (narrowly losing to Real Madrid) becoming the first English team to reach the final of the Champions League and the domestic cup competitions in the same season.

Having also been in the title race at Christmas, Chelsea only secured a top-four spot in the closing week of the campaign, whilst also finishing the season empty-handed, including a third FA Cup final loss in three years (also losing the League Cup final to Liverpool), as their season quickly unravelled amid off-field troubles caused by sanctions being placed against owner Roman Abramovich in the aftermath of Russia's invasion of Ukraine, forcing Abramovich to put the club up for sale. North London rivals Arsenal and Tottenham Hotspur ended up battling it out to secure fourth place; in the end, Tottenham emerged victorious in spite of a dreadful start to the season under former Wolves manager Nuno Espírito Santo, with the appointment of former Chelsea manager Antonio Conte ultimately proving to be an inspired choice – as a result, despite recovering from their worst ever start to a Premier League season to achieve a return to European football, Arsenal could only manage fifth place as a result of several big losses in the spring.

Manchester United endured one of their worst season at the time since the retirement of Alex Ferguson, they has early exits in both domestic cups and several losses in the league, including losing 5–0 at home to Liverpool (and then 4–0 at Anfield in the return game) and 4–1 to promoted Watford, the later game ultimately resulting in the sacking of manager Ole Gunnar Solskjær – and despite the appointment of Ralf Rangnick on an interim basis and the goals of returning striker Cristiano Ronaldo keeping them in the Champions League race, an equally poor end to the season saw the Red Devils finish sixth and with their lowest Premier League points total, only ensuring a Europa League spot and finished closer to Crystal Palace in 12th than Arsenal in 5th. Newcastle United had what proved to be an eventful season both on and off the pitch, at the start to the season, they were takeover by the Public Investment Fund after years of protest against owner Mike Ashley – and whilst the threat of relegation still lingered over the Magpies in the New Year, the appointment of new head coach Eddie Howe and a number of shrewd January signings helped the club rise up the table and into mid-table.

Despite picking up fewer wins than the previous year and seeing a number of first-team players depart in the summer, Crystal Palace had an impressive first season under the management of Arsenal legend Patrick Vieira, with Palace playing with a more attacking style of football and with the end results being quite successful, the club never got close to the relegation zone on top of reaching the FA Cup semi-finals, finishing with a positive goal difference and taking four points off Manchester City in the league. Brentford enjoyed what proved to be a rollercoaster campaign in their first top flight season in 74 years, making a superb start before slowing down, but the January signing of midfielder Christian Eriksen proved to be a big turning point for their season, with Brentford picking up a number of wins (including their first away win against Chelsea in 83 years) in the closing months to ensure a second successive season in the Premier League.

Having won automatic promotion the previous season, both Norwich City and Watford endured an immediate return to the Championship – the tone for the Canaries' season being set by an opening run of six straight losses, with even the surprise decision to replace promotion-winning manager Daniel Farke with Dean Smith after eleven games failing to give the Norfolk club much in terms of inspiration; likewise for Watford, despite a reasonable start that included a 4–1 home victory over Manchester United in November, the Hornets simply never got to grips with the fast pace of the top-flight, making it through three different managers across the season and breaking a number of unwanted records for their form at Vicarage Road, including consecutive home losses and number of home losses as well as failing to keep a clean sheet until May. Taking the final relegation place, after weeks of twists and turns, were Burnley, the Clarets falling into the relegation zone in the closing minutes of the season; despite a late upturn in form following the controversial sacking of long-serving manager Sean Dyche, a late collapse that saw them gain just one point from their last four games proved fatal. Leeds United finished just above them, the equally controversial decision to sack promotion-winning manager Marcelo Bielsa in favour of Jesse Marsch proving to give the Yorkshire club just enough to avoid the drop, in spite of an atrocious defensive record - whilst Everton overcame one of their worst league seasons, including securing their joint-worst points tally for a league campaign in their history and recording just three wins in 23 between the start of October and early April, to finish in 16th.

Pos	Team	Pld	W	D	L	GF	GA	GD	Pts	Qualification or relegation
1	Manchester City (C)	38	29	6	3	99	26	+73	93	Qualification for the Champions League group stage
2	Liverpool	38	28	8	2	94	26	+68	92	Qualification for the Champions League group stage
3	Chelsea	38	21	11	6	76	33	+43	74	Qualification for the Champions League group stage
4	Tottenham Hotspur	38	22	5	11	69	40	+29	71	Qualification for the Champions League group stage
5	Arsenal	38	22	3	13	61	48	+13	69	Qualification for the Europa League group stage (Note: Since the winners of the 2021–22 FA Cup and the 2021–22 EFL Cup, Liverpool, qualified for the Champions League, the spot given to the FA Cup winners (Europa League group stage) was passed to the sixth-placed team and the spot given to the League Cup winners (Europa Conference League play-off round) was passed to the seventh-placed team.)
6	Manchester United	38	16	10	12	57	57	0	58	Qualification for the Europa League group stage
7	West Ham United	38	16	8	14	60	51	+9	56	Qualification for the Europa Conference League play-off round
8	Leicester City	38	14	10	14	62	59	+3	52	
9	Brighton & Hove Albion	38	12	15	11	42	44	−2	51	
10	Wolverhampton Wanderers	38	15	6	17	38	43	−5	51	
11	Newcastle United	38	13	10	15	44	62	−18	49	
12	Crystal Palace	38	11	15	12	50	46	+4	48	
13	Brentford	38	13	7	18	48	56	−8	46	
14	Aston Villa	38	13	6	19	52	54	−2	45	
15	Southampton	38	9	13	16	43	67	−24	40	
16	Everton	38	11	6	21	43	66	−23	39	
17	Leeds United	38	9	11	18	42	79	−37	38	
18	Burnley (R)	38	7	14	17	34	53	−19	35	Relegation to EFL Championship
19	Watford (R)	38	6	5	27	34	77	−43	23	Relegation to EFL Championship
20	Norwich City (R)	38	5	7	26	23	84	−61	22	Relegation to EFL Championship

Source: Premier League
Rules for classification: 1) Points; 2) Goal difference; 3) Goals scored; 4) If the champions, relegated teams or qualified teams for UEFA competitions cannot be determined by rules 1 to 3, rules 4.1 to 4.3 are applied – 4.1) Points gained in head-to-head record between such teams; 4.2) Away goals scored in head-to-head record between such teams; 4.3) Play-offs
(C) Champions; (R) Relegated

=== Championship ===
Despite a few shaky spells of form across the season, Fulham secured promotion back to the Premier League as champions – their third in five years and their second consecutive immediate return – the London club never looking like falling out of the top six all season, becoming the first second-tier team in twenty years to score over 100 goals in a season and with star striker Aleksandar Mitrovic scoring an unprecedented 43 of those, a new record for the second tier. Taking the second automatic promotion spot were Bournemouth, who put both their play-off disappointment the previous year and an inconsistent run of form over the winter months behind them to return to the top-flight after two years and earning manager Scott Parker his second promotion in three seasons (having ironically moved to the club from Fulham). In one of the biggest turnarounds of the season, Nottingham Forest took the final spot through the play-offs – having looked like facing relegation early in the season with one point from their first seven games. The appointment of former Swansea and England youth manager Steve Cooper saw the East Midlands club rocket up the table and solidify themselves in the top six after the March international break, before squeezing through the play-offs and ending a 23-year exile from the top-flight with victory over Huddersfield Town.

At the bottom of the table, owing to a points deduction being imposed on Reading for breaching financial rules, the Royals ended up enduring yet another relegation battle, albeit one that they managed to win at the expense of Barnsley, Derby County and Peterborough United – Barnsley enduring a horrendous opening half of the season and falling back into League One after three years, with even their usual late rally proving to be not enough to stave off the drop as the Tykes never quite recovered from the loss of manager Valérien Ismaël to West Bromwich Albion before the season started. Just one year after pulling off a narrow escape from relegation and in spite of some big results across the campaign, the points deductions imposed on Derby early in the season (12 for entering administration and 9 for financial irregularities) proved to be too much for the Rams to overcome, consigning the club to the third tier for the first time since 1986 – with even attempts to find new owners during the season almost ending in disaster, with a planned takeover falling through in June, before an ultimately successful takeover on the eve of the following season. Despite a late rally, Peterborough United endured immediate relegation back to League One, never really looking like escaping the drop in spite of both a decent run of wins in the early months of the season as well as the late return of former manager Grant McCann. Ultimately, Derby suffering the two points deductions spared the Royals from the drop, though in the event of neither side receiving any points deductions, they would still have been relegated due to their inferior goal difference compared to Birmingham City.

Pos	Team	Pld	W	D	L	GF	GA	GD	Pts	Promotion, qualification or relegation
1	Fulham (C, P)	46	27	9	10	106	43	+63	90	Promotion to the Premier League
2	Bournemouth (P)	46	25	13	8	74	39	+35	88	Promotion to the Premier League
3	Huddersfield Town	46	23	13	10	64	47	+17	82	Qualification for Championship play-offs
4	Nottingham Forest (O, P)	46	23	11	12	73	40	+33	80	Qualification for Championship play-offs
5	Sheffield United	46	21	12	13	63	45	+18	75	Qualification for Championship play-offs
6	Luton Town	46	21	12	13	63	55	+8	75	Qualification for Championship play-offs
7	Middlesbrough	46	20	10	16	59	50	+9	70	
8	Blackburn Rovers	46	19	12	15	59	50	+9	69	
9	Millwall	46	18	15	13	53	45	+8	69	
10	West Bromwich Albion	46	18	13	15	52	45	+7	67	
11	Queens Park Rangers	46	19	9	18	60	59	+1	66	
12	Coventry City	46	17	13	16	60	59	+1	64	
13	Preston North End	46	16	16	14	52	56	−4	64	
14	Stoke City	46	17	11	18	57	52	+5	62	
15	Swansea City	46	16	13	17	58	68	−10	61	
16	Blackpool	46	16	12	18	54	58	−4	60	
17	Bristol City	46	15	10	21	62	77	−15	55	
18	Cardiff City	46	15	8	23	50	68	−18	53	
19	Hull City	46	14	9	23	41	54	−13	51	
20	Birmingham City	46	11	14	21	50	75	−25	47	
21	Reading	46	13	8	25	54	87	−33	41 (Note: Reading were deducted 6 points for breach of profit and sustainability regulations.)	
22	Peterborough United (R)	46	9	10	27	43	87	−44	37	Relegation to EFL League One
23	Derby County (R)	46	14	13	19	45	53	−8	34 (Note: Derby County were deducted 12 points for entering administration, and a further 9 points for financial irregularities.)	Relegation to EFL League One
24	Barnsley (R)	46	6	12	28	33	73	−40	30	Relegation to EFL League One

Source: EFL Official Website
Rules for classification: 1) Points; 2) Goal difference; 3) Number of goals scored; 4) Head-to-head results; 5) Wins; 6) Away goals; 7) Penalty points (sec 9.5); 8) 12-point sending off offences
(C) Champions; (O) Play-off winners; (P) Promoted; (R) Relegated

=== League One ===
The battle to finish in the top six ended up going to the last day of the season, owing to a big drop in form for frontrunners Rotherham United and the teams in and around the play-off places picking up points – but Wigan Athletic ultimately emerged as champions, putting the uncertainties of the previous year behind them and securing their third promotion to the Championship since 2016. Rotherham ultimately finished in second, a late good run of form propelling the Millers back into the second tier and ensuring their third immediate promotion from League One in five years, as well as the sixth consecutive season in which they moved between the Championship and League One. Taking the final promotion spot with a convincing play-off final win against Wycombe Wanderers were Sunderland, the Black Cats overcoming the surprise sacking of manager Lee Johnson at the end of January and some poor away form in the campaign to secure their first promotion in 15 years - with the equally surprising decision to appoint former Norwich City manager Alex Neil as head coach proving to be a successful one.

Just two seasons after having been promoted, Crewe Alexandra were relegated, becoming the first team in the Football League to be relegated that season, having not left the relegation zone after their second game and conceding several heavy defeats. The remaining three relegation places were decided on the final day. AFC Wimbledon were relegated for the first time, returning to League Two after six seasons, having not won a league match after 25 December. Despite being among the pre-season promotion favourites, Doncaster Rovers finished just above the relegation zone, having also dropped into it after their second game; a series of wins in the closing weeks of the campaign allowed the club to avoid relegation. Gillingham took the final relegation place following a run of poor form by the club in the closing weeks of the season, marking their first relegation in nine years. Fleetwood and Morecambe avoided relegation, with Morecambe finishing their first League One season outside the relegation places despite recording the division's worst defensive record.

Pos	Team	Pld	W	D	L	GF	GA	GD	Pts	Promotion, qualification or relegation
1	Wigan Athletic (C, P)	46	27	11	8	82	44	+38	92	Promotion to EFL Championship
2	Rotherham United (P)	46	27	9	10	70	33	+37	90	Promotion to EFL Championship
3	Milton Keynes Dons	46	26	11	9	78	44	+34	89	Qualification for League One play-offs
4	Sheffield Wednesday	46	24	13	9	78	50	+28	85	Qualification for League One play-offs
5	Sunderland (O, P)	46	24	12	10	79	53	+26	84	Qualification for League One play-offs
6	Wycombe Wanderers	46	23	14	9	75	51	+24	83	Qualification for League One play-offs
7	Plymouth Argyle	46	23	11	12	68	48	+20	80	
8	Oxford United	46	22	10	14	82	59	+23	76	
9	Bolton Wanderers	46	21	10	15	74	57	+17	73	
10	Portsmouth	46	20	13	13	68	51	+17	73	
11	Ipswich Town	46	18	16	12	67	46	+21	70	
12	Accrington Stanley	46	17	10	19	61	80	−19	61	
13	Charlton Athletic	46	17	8	21	55	59	−4	59	
14	Cambridge United	46	15	13	18	56	74	−18	58	
15	Cheltenham Town	46	13	17	16	66	80	−14	56	
16	Burton Albion	46	14	11	21	51	67	−16	53	
17	Lincoln City	46	14	10	22	55	63	−8	52	
18	Shrewsbury Town	46	12	14	20	47	51	−4	50	
19	Morecambe	46	10	12	24	57	88	−31	42	
20	Fleetwood Town	46	8	16	22	62	82	−20	40	
21	Gillingham (R)	46	8	16	22	35	69	−34	40	Relegation to EFL League Two
22	Doncaster Rovers (R)	46	10	8	28	37	82	−45	38	Relegation to EFL League Two
23	AFC Wimbledon (R)	46	6	19	21	49	75	−26	37	Relegation to EFL League Two
24	Crewe Alexandra (R)	46	7	8	31	37	83	−46	29	Relegation to EFL League Two

Source: EFL Official Website
Rules for classification: 1) Points; 2) Goal difference; 3) Number of goals scored; 4) Head-to-head results; 5) Wins; 6) Away goals; 7) Penalty points based on yellow and red cards received excluding the last four games of the season (sec 9.5); 8) 12-point sending off offences; 9) If the tie affects the automatic promotion or relegation places, a play-off game or games would be held between the two tied teams
(C) Champions; (O) Play-off winners; (P) Promoted; (R) Relegated

=== League Two ===
After consecutive campaigns of near-misses and heartbreak, Forest Green Rovers marked both five years in the Football League and Rob Edwards' first season as head coach with their first ever promotion to League One, going up as champions on goal difference and not falling out of the top three once in the campaign, even with poor form in the New Year nearly making them lose out on top spot. Exeter City finished not far behind them, finally achieving promotion back to the third tier following years of play-off final losses, heartbreak and near-misses in manager Matt Taylor's fourth season as manager. Taking the third automatic promotion spot in extraordinary circumstances were Bristol Rovers, who managed an immediate return to the third tier by virtue of goals scored after a 7–0 victory in their final game, narrowly edging out Northampton Town despite having never been in the top three prior to the final day. Ending a five-year absence from the third tier by winning the play-offs were Port Vale - who overcame both a run of inconsistent form in the New Year and the absence of manager Darrell Clarke for nearly three months following the death of his daughter to secure fifth place and run out comfortable winners in the final.

Despite missing out on a play-off spot on the last day, Sutton United enjoyed a very successful maiden campaign in the Football League that included a narrow loss in the EFL Trophy final; having started slowly, the London club rocketed up the table, staying in and around the top seven from October onwards and with only a heavy home loss in their penultimate game going against the club. Having made a decent start on their return to the Football League, the departure of manager Dave Challinor to Stockport County saw Hartlepool United suffer a steep decline in form that saw them fall from the play-off places to mid-table; whilst the worse form of the teams below them ensured that the Pools never fell into the relegation battle, a disappointing 17th place was all the club could manage, a far cry from their promotion chasing run early in the season.

After 72 years of Football League membership and just eleven years after having been in the Championship, Scunthorpe United's resilience finally gave out and they endured relegation to the National League, the Iron only escaping the drop zone once after their seventh game and securing just four wins across all competitions, as well as going down with statistically the worst playing record of any club relegated to the National League since Doncaster Rovers' infamously poor 1997–98 campaign. The battle to avoid the second spot proved to be tighter, with Barrow, Oldham Athletic and Stevenage fighting it out – but despite the return of manager John Sheridan for a fourth spell as Oldham manager, both Barrow and Stevenage achieved good runs of form in the closing months, enabling them to escape the drop and ending the Latics' 115-year run in the Football League (also resulting in them becoming the first former Premier League club to be relegated out of the Football League), the club not being helped by escalating fan anger towards owner Abdallah Lemsagam, including an on-field protest in the game that saw them relegated.

Pos	Team	Pld	W	D	L	GF	GA	GD	Pts	Promotion, qualification or relegation
1	Forest Green Rovers (C, P)	46	23	15	8	75	44	+31	84	Promotion to EFL League One
2	Exeter City (P)	46	23	15	8	65	41	+24	84	Promotion to EFL League One
3	Bristol Rovers (P)	46	23	11	12	71	49	+22	80	Promotion to EFL League One
4	Northampton Town	46	23	11	12	60	38	+22	80	Qualification for League Two play-offs
5	Port Vale (O, P)	46	22	12	12	67	46	+21	78	Qualification for League Two play-offs
6	Swindon Town	46	22	11	13	77	54	+23	77	Qualification for League Two play-offs
7	Mansfield Town	46	22	11	13	67	52	+15	77	Qualification for League Two play-offs
8	Sutton United	46	22	10	14	69	53	+16	76	
9	Tranmere Rovers	46	21	12	13	53	40	+13	75	
10	Salford City	46	19	13	14	60	46	+14	70	
11	Newport County	46	19	12	15	67	58	+9	69	
12	Crawley Town	46	17	10	19	56	66	−10	61	
13	Leyton Orient	46	14	16	16	62	47	+15	58	
14	Bradford City	46	14	16	16	53	55	−2	58	
15	Colchester United	46	14	13	19	48	60	−12	55	
16	Walsall	46	14	12	20	47	60	−13	54	
17	Hartlepool United	46	14	12	20	44	64	−20	54	
18	Rochdale	46	12	17	17	51	59	−8	53	
19	Harrogate Town	46	14	11	21	64	75	−11	53	
20	Carlisle United	46	14	11	21	39	62	−23	53	
21	Stevenage	46	11	14	21	45	68	−23	47	
22	Barrow	46	10	14	22	44	57	−13	44	
23	Oldham Athletic (R)	46	9	11	26	46	75	−29	38	Relegation to National League
24	Scunthorpe United (R)	46	4	14	28	29	90	−61	26	Relegation to National League

Source: EFL Official Website
Rules for classification: 1) Points; 2) Goal difference; 3) Number of goals scored; 4) Head-to-head results; 5) Wins; 6) Away goals; 7) Penalty points (sec 9.5); 8) 12-point sending off offences
(C) Champions; (O) Play-off winners; (P) Promoted; (R) Relegated

=== National League ===
After a late season title race which extended to the final day, Stockport county secured promotion back to the Football League for the first time since 2011. A strong run of form in early 2022 saw the Hatters rise from the play-off positions to win the National League Title. They were joined by Grimsby Town, who secured an immediate return to the EFL via the play-offs. Grimsby's Campaign was notable for requiring extra time in all three fixtures, with The Mariners scoring late winning goals in each match to progress.

At the bottom of the table, Dover Athletic endured perhaps the worst season in the history of the top five flights of English football, enduring a points deduction before the campaign started for their failure to fulfil all their fixtures the previous year, finishing with just one point as a result and conceding 101 goals (Hyde United's 2013–14 campaign was statistically worse, but they did not have any points deducted and thus finished with ten points). Weymouth finished second from bottom, the Dorset club never quite looking like overcoming the loss of their promotion-winning manager two seasons prior, but at least prolonging their stay in the fifth tier until the closing weeks of the campaign – with King's Lynn Town finishing just above them in turn, the club enduring the relegation they had only avoided the previous year owing to there being no promotions or relegations between the National League tiers.

Pos	Team	Pld	W	D	L	GF	GA	GD	Pts	Promotion, qualification or relegation
1	Stockport County (C, P)	44	30	4	10	87	38	+49	94	Promotion to EFL League Two
2	Wrexham	44	26	10	8	91	46	+45	88	Qualification for the National League play-off semi-finals
3	Solihull Moors	44	25	12	7	83	45	+38	87	Qualification for the National League play-off semi-finals
4	FC Halifax Town	44	25	9	10	62	35	+27	84	Qualification for the National League play-off quarter-finals
5	Notts County	44	24	10	10	81	52	+29	82	Qualification for the National League play-off quarter-finals
6	Grimsby Town (O, P)	44	23	8	13	68	46	+22	77	Qualification for the National League play-off quarter-finals
7	Chesterfield	44	20	14	10	69	51	+18	74	Qualification for the National League play-off quarter-finals
8	Dagenham & Redbridge	44	22	7	15	80	53	+27	73	
9	Boreham Wood	44	18	13	13	49	40	+9	67	
10	Bromley	44	18	13	13	61	53	+8	67	
11	Torquay United	44	18	12	14	66	54	+12	66	
12	Yeovil Town	44	15	14	15	43	46	−3	59	
13	Southend United	44	16	10	18	45	61	−16	58	
14	Altrincham	44	15	10	19	62	69	−7	55	
15	Woking	44	16	5	23	59	61	−2	53	
16	Wealdstone	44	14	11	19	51	65	−14	53	
17	Maidenhead United	44	13	12	19	48	67	−19	51	
18	Barnet	44	13	11	20	59	89	−30	50	
19	Eastleigh	44	12	10	22	52	74	−22	46	
20	Aldershot Town	44	11	10	23	46	73	−27	43	
21	King's Lynn Town (R)	44	8	10	26	47	79	−32	34	Relegation to National League North
22	Weymouth (R)	44	6	10	28	40	88	−48	28	Relegation to National League South
23	Dover Athletic (R)	44	2	7	35	37	101	−64	1 (Note: Dover Athletic were deducted twelve points for failing to complete fixtures during the 2020–21 season.)	Relegation to National League South

Source: National League official site
Rules for classification: 1) Points; 2) Goal difference; 3) Number of goals scored; 4) Number of matches won; 5) Head-to-head results
(C) Champions; (O) Play-off winners; (P) Promoted; (R) Relegated
Notes:

Pos	Team	Pld	W	D	L	GF	GA	GD	Pts	Promotion, qualification or relegation
1	Gateshead (C, P)	42	29	7	6	99	47	+52	94	Promotion to National League
2	Brackley Town	42	25	12	5	53	23	+30	87	Qualification for the National League North play-off semi-finals
3	AFC Fylde	42	24	8	10	68	37	+31	80	Qualification for the National League North play-off semi-finals
4	Kidderminster Harriers	42	21	11	10	72	35	+37	74	Qualification for the National League North play-off quarter-finals
5	York City (O, P)	42	19	9	14	58	50	+8	66	Qualification for the National League North play-off quarter-finals
6	Chorley	42	17	14	11	62	49	+13	65	Qualification for the National League North play-off quarter-finals
7	Boston United	42	18	9	15	63	57	+6	63	Qualification for the National League North play-off quarter-finals
8	Kettering Town	42	16	13	13	54	48	+6	61	
9	Alfreton Town	42	17	10	15	58	59	−1	61	
10	Spennymoor Town	42	17	9	16	55	51	+4	60	
11	Southport	42	14	15	13	60	55	+5	57	
12	Hereford	42	15	10	17	51	52	−1	55	
13	Darlington	42	14	11	17	57	58	−1	53	
14	Curzon Ashton	42	13	13	16	51	63	−12	52	
15	Leamington	42	12	12	18	39	47	−8	48	
16	Chester	42	12	11	19	70	71	−1	47	
17	Gloucester City	42	10	16	16	47	60	−13	46	
18	Bradford (Park Avenue)	42	11	11	20	46	70	−24	44	
19	Blyth Spartans	42	12	7	23	41	76	−35	43	
20	AFC Telford United	42	7	16	19	48	65	−17	37	
21	Farsley Celtic	42	9	10	23	37	78	−41	37	
22	Guiseley (R)	42	9	8	25	31	69	−38	35	Relegation to the Northern Premier League Premier Division

Source: National League official site
Rules for classification: 1) Points; 2) Goal difference; 3) Number of goals scored; 4) Number of matches won; 5) Head-to-head results
(C) Champions; (O) Play-off winners; (P) Promoted; (R) Relegated

Pos	Team	Pld	W	D	L	GF	GA	GD	Pts	Promotion, qualification or relegation
1	Maidstone United (C, P)	40	27	6	7	80	38	+42	87	Promotion to National League
2	Dorking Wanderers (O, P)	40	25	6	9	101	53	+48	81	Qualification for the National League South play-off semi-finals
3	Ebbsfleet United	40	24	4	12	78	53	+25	76	Qualification for the National League South play-off semi-finals
4	Dartford	40	21	11	8	75	42	+33	74	Qualification for the National League South play-off quarter-finals
5	Oxford City	40	19	12	9	71	46	+25	69	Qualification for the National League South play-off quarter-finals
6	Eastbourne Borough	40	17	9	14	73	67	+6	60	Qualification for the National League South play-off quarter-finals
7	Chippenham Town	40	16	11	13	61	50	+11	59	Qualification for the National League South play-off quarter-finals
8	Havant & Waterlooville	40	15	12	13	58	55	+3	57	
9	St Albans City	40	15	7	18	55	58	−3	52	
10	Dulwich Hamlet	40	13	12	15	63	60	+3	51	
11	Hampton & Richmond Borough	40	14	9	17	56	56	0	51	
12	Hungerford Town	40	15	4	21	59	68	−9	49	
13	Slough Town	40	12	13	15	51	69	−18	49	
14	Concord Rangers	40	13	10	17	53	72	−19	49	
15	Hemel Hempstead Town	40	13	9	18	49	72	−23	48	
16	Tonbridge Angels	40	11	12	17	43	53	−10	45	
17	Braintree Town	40	11	12	17	38	54	−16	45	
18	Bath City	40	13	6	21	45	68	−23	45	
19	Chelmsford City	40	9	14	17	46	53	−7	41	
20	Welling United	40	10	8	22	46	87	−41	38	
21	Billericay Town (R)	40	9	9	22	41	68	−27	36	Relegation to the Isthmian League Premier Division

Source: National League official site
Rules for classification: 1) Points; 2) Goal difference; 3) Number of goals scored; 4) Number of matches won; 5) Head-to-head results
(C) Champions; (O) Play-off winners; (P) Promoted; (R) Relegated

=== League play-offs ===
==== Football League play-offs ====
===== EFL Championship =====
====== Final ======
29 May 2022
16:30 BST

Huddersfield Town	0–1	Nottingham Forest
	Report	Colwill 43' (o.g.)

Wembley Stadium, London
Attendance: 80,019
Referee: Jon Moss

===== EFL League One =====
====== Final ======
21 May 2022
15:00 BST

Wycombe Wanderers	0–2	Sunderland
	Report	Embleton 12'; Stewart 79'

Wembley Stadium, London
Attendance: 72,332
Referee: Simon Hooper

===== EFL League Two =====
====== Final ======
28 May 2022
16:00 BST

Mansfield Town	0–3	Port Vale
	Report	Harratt 20'; Wilson 24'; Benning 85'

Wembley Stadium, London
Attendance: 37,303
Referee: Jarred Gillett

==== National League play-offs ====
===== National League =====
====== Final ======
5 June 2022
15:00 BST

Solihull Moors	1–2 (a.e.t.)	Grimsby Town
Hudlin 45+1'	Report	McAtee 69'; Maguire-Drew 111'

London Stadium, London
Attendance: 22,897
Referee: Martin Woods

=== Cup Competitions ===
==== FA Cup ====
===== Final =====
14 May 2022
16:45 BST

Chelsea	0–0 (a.e.t.)	Liverpool
	Report
Penalties
Alonso (penalty scored); Azpilicueta (penalty missed); James (penalty scored); Barkley (penalty scored); Jorginho (penalty scored); Ziyech (penalty scored); Mount (penalty missed)	5–6	(penalty scored) Milner; (penalty scored) Thiago; (penalty scored) Firmino; (penalty scored) Alexander-Arnold; (penalty missed) Mané; (penalty scored) Jota; (penalty scored) Tsimikas

Wembley Stadium, London
Attendance: 84,897
Referee: Craig Pawson (Sheffield & Hallamshire)

==== EFL Cup ====
===== Final =====
27 February 2022
16:30 GMT

Chelsea	0–0 (a.e.t.)	Liverpool
	Report
Penalties
Alonso (penalty scored); Lukaku (penalty scored); Havertz (penalty scored); James (penalty scored); Jorginho (penalty scored); Rüdiger (penalty scored); Kanté (penalty scored); Werner (penalty scored); Silva (penalty scored); Chalobah (penalty scored); Arrizabalaga (penalty missed)	10–11	(penalty scored) Milner; (penalty scored) Fabinho; (penalty scored) Van Dijk; (penalty scored) Alexander-Arnold; (penalty scored) Salah; (penalty scored) Jota; (penalty scored) Origi; (penalty scored) Robertson; (penalty scored) Elliott; (penalty scored) Konaté; (penalty scored) Kelleher

Wembley Stadium, London
Attendance: 85,512
Referee: Stuart Attwell (Warwickshire)

==== Community Shield ====
7 August 2021
17:15 BST

Leicester City	1–0	Manchester City
Iheanacho 89' (pen.)	Report

Wembley Stadium, London
Attendance: 45,602
Referee: Paul Tierney (Lancashire)

==== EFL Trophy ====
===== Final =====
3 April 2022
15:00

Rotherham United	4–2 (a.e.t.)	Sutton United
Wiles 42'; Osei-Tutu 90+6'; Ogbene 96'; Ihiekwe 112'	Report	Wilson 30'; Eastmond 48'

Wembley Stadium, London
Attendance: 30,688
Referee: Seb Stockbridge

==== FA Trophy ====
===== Final =====
22 May 2022
16:15 BST

Wrexham	0–1	Bromley
	Report	Cheek 64'

Wembley Stadium, London
Attendance: 46,111
Referee: Thomas Bramall

== Women's football ==
=== FA Women's Super League ===
Pos	Team	Pld	W	D	L	GF	GA	GD	Pts	Qualification or relegation
1	Chelsea (C)	22	18	2	2	62	11	+51	56	Qualification for the Champions League group stage
2	Arsenal	22	17	4	1	65	10	+55	55	Qualification for the Champions League second round
3	Manchester City	22	15	2	5	60	22	+38	47	Qualification for the Champions League first round
4	Manchester United	22	12	6	4	45	22	+23	42	
5	Tottenham Hotspur	22	9	5	8	24	23	+1	32	
6	West Ham United	22	7	6	9	23	33	−10	27	
7	Brighton & Hove Albion	22	8	2	12	24	38	−14	26	
8	Reading	22	7	4	11	21	40	−19	25	
9	Aston Villa	22	6	3	13	13	40	−27	21	
10	Everton	22	5	5	12	18	41	−23	20	
11	Leicester City	22	4	1	17	14	53	−39	13	
12	Birmingham City (R)	22	3	2	17	15	51	−36	11	Relegation to the Championship

Source: FA WSL
Rules for classification: 1) Points; 2) Goal difference; 3) Number of goals scored.
(C) Champions; (R) Relegated

=== FA Women's Championship ===
Pos	Team	Pld	W	D	L	GF	GA	GD	Pts	Qualification
1	Liverpool (C, P)	22	16	4	2	49	11	+38	52	Promotion to the WSL (Note: Dependent on obtaining a licence.)
2	London City Lionesses	22	13	2	7	35	22	+13	41	
3	Bristol City	22	11	4	7	43	28	+15	37	
4	Crystal Palace	22	11	4	7	35	39	−4	37	
5	Charlton Athletic	22	10	4	8	27	18	+9	34	
6	Durham	22	10	4	8	30	28	+2	34	
7	Sheffield United	22	9	6	7	34	31	+3	33	
8	Lewes	22	9	2	11	23	24	−1	29	
9	Sunderland	22	6	6	10	23	32	−9	24	
10	Blackburn Rovers	22	5	2	15	17	41	−24	17	
11	Coventry United	22	5	7	10	18	32	−14	12 (Note: Coventry United were deducted 10 points on 6 January 2022 for triggering an insolvency event.)	
12	Watford (R)	22	2	5	15	18	46	−28	11	Relegation to the Southern Premier Division

Rules for classification: 1) Points; 2) Goal difference; 3) Number of goals scored
(C) Champions; (P) Promoted; (R) Relegated

=== Women's National League ===
==== Northern Premier Division ====
Pos	Team	Pld	W	D	L	GF	GA	GD	Pts	Promotion or relegation
1	Wolverhampton Wanderers (C)	24	18	5	1	61	16	+45	59	Qualification for the Championship play-off
2	Derby County	24	16	3	5	48	19	+29	51	
3	AFC Fylde	24	14	5	5	47	28	+19	47	
4	Burnley	24	14	4	6	70	27	+43	46	
5	Nottingham Forest	24	13	5	6	40	17	+23	44	
6	Huddersfield Town	24	13	4	7	54	28	+26	43	
7	Brighouse Town	24	11	7	6	51	31	+20	40	
8	West Bromwich Albion	24	7	7	10	29	44	−15	28	
9	Stoke City	24	8	1	15	36	54	−18	25	
10	Loughborough Lightning	24	6	5	13	35	63	−28	23	
11	Middlesbrough (R)	24	5	3	16	27	67	−40	18	Relegation to the Division One North
12	Hull City (R)	24	2	3	19	18	72	−54	9	Relegation to the Division One North
13	Sheffield (R)	24	2	2	20	13	63	−50	8	Relegation to the Division One Midlands

Source: The Football Association
Rules for classification: 1) Points; 2) Goal difference; 3) Number of goals scored
(C) Champions; (R) Relegated

==== Southern Premier Division ====
Pos	Team	Pld	W	D	L	GF	GA	GD	Pts	Promotion or relegation
1	Southampton (C, O, P)	26	22	3	1	99	13	+86	69	Qualification for the Championship play-off
2	Oxford United	26	19	3	4	71	15	+56	60	
3	Ipswich Town	26	18	4	4	69	14	+55	58	
4	Bridgwater United	26	15	5	6	48	16	+32	50	
5	Crawley Wasps	26	15	0	11	57	40	+17	45	
6	Gillingham	26	13	6	7	37	33	+4	45	
7	Portsmouth	26	13	4	9	51	29	+22	43	
8	London Bees	26	9	3	14	46	51	−5	30	
9	Milton Keynes Dons	26	8	5	13	34	42	−8	29	
10	Plymouth Argyle	26	9	2	15	46	61	−15	29	
11	Cardiff City Ladies (R)	26	8	2	16	33	52	−19	24 (Note: Cardiff City were deducted one point for failing to fulfil a fixture against Southampton on 9 October 2021. Deducted further one point for failing to fulfil another fixture)	Relegation to the Division One South West
12	Chichester & Selsey (R)	26	7	3	16	31	60	−29	24	Relegation to the Division One South West
13	Keynsham Town (R)	26	6	0	20	31	110	−79	18	Relegation to the Division One South West
14	Hounslow (R)	26	0	0	26	5	122	−117	0	Relegation to the Division One South East

Source: The Football Association
Rules for classification: 1) Points; 2) Goal difference; 3) Number of goals scored
(C) Champions; (O) Play-off winners; (P) Promoted; (R) Relegated

==== Division One North ====
Pos	Team	Pld	W	D	L	GF	GA	GD	Pts	Promotion or relegation
1	Liverpool Feds (C, P)	22	19	2	1	60	11	+49	59	Promotion to the Northern Premier Division
2	Newcastle United	22	18	2	2	85	16	+69	56	
3	Durham Cestria	22	13	2	7	65	35	+30	41	
4	Leeds United	22	12	4	6	51	34	+17	40	
5	Chorley	22	8	10	4	39	34	+5	34	
6	Stockport County	22	7	6	9	44	42	+2	27	
7	Bradford City	22	7	5	10	39	48	−9	26	
8	Norton & Stockton Ancients	22	7	5	10	35	45	−10	26	
9	Barnsley	22	8	2	12	41	51	−10	23 (Note: Barnsley were deducted three points)	
10	F.C. United of Manchester (R)	22	6	3	13	34	72	−38	21	Relegation from the National League
11	Chester-le-Street (R)	22	3	5	14	28	62	−34	14	Relegation from the National League
12	Alnwick Town (R)	22	0	2	20	24	95	−71	2	Relegation from the National League

Source: The Football Association
Rules for classification: 1) Points; 2) Goal difference; 3) Number of goals scored
(C) Champions; (P) Promoted; (R) Relegated

==== Division One Midlands ====
Pos	Team	Pld	W	D	L	GF	GA	GD	Pts	Promotion or relegation
1	Boldmere St. Michaels (C, P)	22	16	3	3	59	20	+39	51	Promotion to the Northern Premier Division
2	Doncaster Rovers Belles	22	15	4	3	55	21	+34	49	
3	Lincoln City	22	15	3	4	68	30	+38	48	
4	Long Eaton United	22	11	5	6	44	27	+17	38	
5	Leek Town	22	10	3	9	51	52	−1	33	
6	Sporting Khalsa	22	9	5	8	37	37	0	32	
7	Solihull Moors	22	9	3	10	55	47	+8	30	
8	Peterborough United	22	8	5	9	45	50	−5	29	
9	Leafield Athletic	22	7	5	10	35	45	−10	26	
10	Wem Town (N)	22	3	6	13	24	47	−23	15	Relegation to the National League
11	Burton Albion (R)	22	4	3	15	26	63	−37	15	Relegation to the National League
12	Bedworth United (R)	22	2	1	19	23	83	−60	7	Relegation to the National League
13	Holwell Sports (W)	0	0	0	0	0	0	0	0	Club withdrew

Source: The Football Association
Rules for classification: 1) Points; 2) Goal difference; 3) Number of goals scored
(C) Champions; (N) Not relegated; (P) Promoted; (R) Relegated; (W) Withdrew from the league

==== Division One South East ====
Pos	Team	Pld	W	D	L	GF	GA	GD	Pts	Promotion or relegation
1	Billericay Town (C, P)	24	20	3	1	77	15	+62	63	Promotion to the Southern Premier Division
2	Hashtag United	24	20	2	2	83	14	+69	62	
3	AFC Wimbledon	24	16	5	3	62	15	+47	53	
4	Queens Park Rangers	24	12	5	7	46	40	+6	41	
5	Actonians	24	11	7	6	52	26	+26	40	
6	London Seaward	24	7	8	9	31	43	−12	29	
7	Cambridge City	24	7	5	12	36	48	−12	26	
8	Norwich City	24	8	2	14	33	56	−23	26	
9	Cambridge United	24	8	2	14	29	60	−31	26	
10	Enfield Town (R)	24	6	6	12	36	37	−1	24	Relegation from the National League
11	Stevenage (R)	24	6	4	14	19	61	−42	22	Relegation from the National League
12	Harlow Town (R)	24	5	2	17	27	73	−46	17	Relegation from the National League
13	Kent Football United (R)	24	3	3	18	19	62	−43	12	Relegation from the National League

Source: The Football Association
Rules for classification: 1) Points; 2) Goal difference; 3) Number of goals scored
(C) Champions; (P) Promoted; (R) Relegated

==== Division One South West ====
Pos	Team	Pld	W	D	L	GF	GA	GD	Pts	Promotion or relegation
1	Cheltenham Town (C, P)	18	14	3	1	44	12	+32	45	Promotion to the Southern Premier Division
2	AFC Bournemouth	18	12	4	2	52	14	+38	40	
3	Exeter City	18	12	2	4	52	19	+33	38	
4	Southampton Women	18	11	4	3	47	14	+33	37	
5	Chesham United	18	8	2	8	31	32	−1	26	
6	Maidenhead United	18	6	4	8	26	32	−6	22	
7	Swindon Town	18	5	4	9	30	31	−1	19	
8	Portishead Town	18	4	4	10	23	44	−21	15 (Note: Portishead Town were deducted one point)	
9	Larkhall Athletic	18	2	4	12	20	52	−32	10	
10	Poole Town (R)	18	0	1	17	3	78	−75	1	Relegation from the National League
11	Buckland Athletic (W)	0	0	0	0	0	0	0	0	Club withdrew

Source: The Football Association
Rules for classification: 1) Points; 2) Goal difference; 3) Number of goals scored
(C) Champions; (P) Promoted; (R) Relegated; (W) Withdrew from the league

=== Women's FA Cup ===
==== Final ====
15 May 2022
14:30 BST

Chelsea	3–2 (a.e.t.)	Manchester City
Kerr 33', 99'; Cuthbert 63'	Report	Hemp 42'; Raso 89'

Wembley Stadium, London
Attendance: 49,094
Referee: Kirsty Dowle (Kent)

=== FA Women's League Cup ===
==== Final ====
5 March 2022
17:15 GMT

Chelsea	1–3	Manchester City
Kerr 34'	Report	Weir 49', 69'; White 58'

Plough Lane, Wimbledon, London
Attendance: 8,004
Referee: Lisa Benn

== Managerial changes ==
This is a list of changes of managers within English league football:

Team	Outgoing manager	Manner of departure	Date of departure	Position in table	Incoming manager	Date of appointment
Leyton Orient	(Jamaica) Jobi McAnuff	End of interim spell	8 May 2021	Pre-season	(Wales) Kenny Jackett	21 May 2021
Swindon Town	(Scotland) Tommy Wright	End of interim spell	8 May 2021	Pre-season	(England) John McGreal	26 May 2021
Bradford City	(England) Mark Trueman (England) Conor Sellars	Sacked	10 May 2021	Pre-season	(Scotland) Derek Adams	4 June 2021
Walsall	(England) Brian Dutton	Sacked	10 May 2021	Pre-season	(England) Matthew Taylor	19 May 2021
Barrow	(England) Rob Kelly	End of caretaker spell	14 May 2021	Pre-season	(England) Mark Cooper	28 May 2021
Doncaster Rovers	(England) Andy Butler	End of interim spell	17 May 2021	Pre-season	(England) Richie Wellens	17 May 2021
West Bromwich Albion	(England) Sam Allardyce	Resigned	23 May 2021	Pre-season	(France) Valérien Ismaël	24 June 2021
Sheffield United	(England) Paul Heckingbottom	End of caretaker spell	23 May 2021	Pre-season	(Serbia) Slaviša Jokanović	27 May 2021
Tranmere Rovers	(England) Ian Dawes	End of caretaker spell	23 May 2021	Pre-season	(Scotland) Micky Mellon	1 June 2021
Forest Green Rovers	(England) Jimmy Ball	End of caretaker spell	23 May 2021	Pre-season	(Wales) Rob Edwards	27 May 2021
Crystal Palace	(England) Roy Hodgson	End of contract	24 May 2021	Pre-season	(France) Patrick Vieira	4 July 2021
Tottenham Hotspur	(England) Ryan Mason	End of caretaker spell	24 May 2021	Pre-season	(Portugal) Nuno Espírito Santo	30 June 2021
Wolverhampton Wanderers	(Portugal) Nuno Espírito Santo	Mutual consent	24 May 2021	Pre-season	(Portugal) Bruno Lage	9 June 2021
Everton	(Italy) Carlo Ancelotti	Signed by Real Madrid	1 June 2021	Pre-season	(Spain) Rafael Benítez	30 June 2021
Morecambe	(Scotland) Derek Adams	Resigned	3 June 2021	Pre-season	(Northern Ireland) Stephen Robinson	7 June 2021
Barnsley	(France) Valérien Ismaël	Signed by West Bromwich Albion	24 June 2021	Pre-season	(Austria) Markus Schopp	29 June 2021
Swindon Town	(England) John McGreal	Mutual consent	25 June 2021	Pre-season	(England) Ben Garner	21 July 2021
Fulham	(England) Scott Parker	Mutual consent	28 June 2021	Pre-season	(Portugal) Marco Silva	1 July 2021
Bournemouth	(England) Jonathan Woodgate	End of contract	28 June 2021	Pre-season	(England) Scott Parker	28 June 2021
Rochdale	(Republic of Ireland) Brian Barry-Murphy	Resigned	30 June 2021	Pre-season	(Scotland) Robbie Stockdale	10 July 2021
Swansea City	(Wales) Steve Cooper	Mutual Consent	21 July 2021	Pre-season	(Scotland) Russell Martin	1 August 2021
Milton Keynes Dons	(Scotland) Russell Martin	Signed by Swansea City	1 August 2021	Pre-season	(England) Liam Manning	13 August 2021
Nottingham Forest	(Republic of Ireland) Chris Hughton	Sacked	16 September 2021	24th	(Wales) Steve Cooper	21 September 2021
Newport County	(Wales) Michael Flynn	Resigned	1 October 2021	15th	(Wales) James Rowberry	19 October 2021
Watford	(Spain) Xisco Muñoz	Sacked	3 October 2021	14th	(Italy) Claudio Ranieri	4 October 2021
Carlisle United	(England) Chris Beech	Sacked	10 October 2021	22nd	(England) Keith Millen	26 October 2021
Newcastle United	(England) Steve Bruce	Mutual consent	20 October 2021	19th	(England) Eddie Howe	8 November 2021
Charlton Athletic	(England) Nigel Adkins	Sacked	21 October 2021	22nd	(England) Johnnie Jackson (Note: Jackson was initially appointed as caretaker manager, but the move was made permanent on 17 December 2021.)	21 October 2021
Cardiff City	(Republic of Ireland) Mick McCarthy	Mutual consent	23 October 2021	21st	(Wales) Steve Morison (Note: Morison was initially appointed as interim manager, but the move was made permanent on 12 November 2021.)	24 October 2021
Barnsley	(Austria) Markus Schopp	Sacked	1 November 2021	23rd	(Sweden) Poya Asbaghi	17 November 2021
Tottenham Hotspur	(Portugal) Nuno Espírito Santo	Sacked	1 November 2021	8th	(Italy) Antonio Conte	2 November 2021
Scunthorpe United	(England) Neil Cox	Sacked	1 November 2021	24th	(England) Keith Hill	5 November 2021
Hartlepool United	(England) Dave Challinor	Signed by Stockport County	1 November 2021	10th	(England) Graeme Lee	1 December 2021
Norwich City	(Germany) Daniel Farke	Sacked	6 November 2021	20th	(England) Dean Smith	15 November 2021
Middlesbrough	(England) Neil Warnock	Mutual consent	6 November 2021	14th	(England) Chris Wilder	7 November 2021
Aston Villa	(England) Dean Smith	Sacked	7 November 2021	15th	(England) Steven Gerrard	11 November 2021
Stevenage	(England) Alex Revell	Sacked	15 November 2021	21st	(England) Paul Tisdale	28 November 2021
Manchester United	(Norway) Ole Gunnar Solskjær	Sacked	21 November 2021	7th	(Germany) Ralf Rangnick (interim)	29 November 2021
Fleetwood Town	(England) Simon Grayson	Sacked	24 November 2021	22nd	(Scotland) Stephen Crainey (Note: Crainey was initially appointed as caretaker manager, but the move was made permanent on 21 December 2021.)	24 November 2021
Oldham Athletic	(England) Keith Curle	Sacked	24 November 2021	22nd	(Tunisia) Selim Benachour (caretaker)	24 November 2021
Sheffield United	(Serbia) Slaviša Jokanović	Sacked	25 November 2021	16th	(England) Paul Heckingbottom	25 November 2021
Doncaster Rovers	(England) Richie Wellens	Sacked	2 December 2021	23rd	(England) Gary McSheffrey (Note: McSheffrey was initially appointed as caretaker manager, but the move was made permanent on 29 December 2021.)	2 December 2021
Ipswich Town	(England) Paul Cook	Sacked	4 December 2021	11th	(Northern Ireland) Kieran McKenna	16 December 2021
Preston North End	(Scotland) Frankie McAvoy	Sacked	6 December 2021	18th	(England) Ryan Lowe	7 December 2021
Plymouth Argyle	(England) Ryan Lowe	Signed by Preston North End	7 December 2021	4th	(England) Steven Schumacher	7 December 2021
Gillingham	(Scotland) Steve Evans	Mutual consent	9 January 2022	22nd	(England) Neil Harris	31 January 2022
Everton	(Spain) Rafael Benítez	Sacked	16 January 2022	15th	(England) Frank Lampard	30 January 2022
Colchester United	(England) Hayden Mullins	Sacked	19 January 2021	22nd	(England) Wayne Brown (Interim)	22 January 2022
Oldham Athletic	(Tunisia) Selim Benachour	End of Interim Spell	22 January 2022	24th	(Republic of Ireland) John Sheridan	22 January 2022
Watford	(Italy) Claudio Ranieri	Sacked	24 January 2022	19th	(England) Roy Hodgson	25 January 2022
Hull City	(Northern Ireland) Grant McCann	Sacked	25 January 2022	19th	(Georgia (country)) Shota Arveladze	27 January 2022
Sunderland	(England) Lee Johnson	Sacked	30 January 2022	3rd	(Scotland) Alex Neil	11 February 2022
West Bromwich Albion	(France) Valérien Ismaël	Sacked	2 February 2022	5th	(England) Steve Bruce	3 February 2022
Walsall	(England) Matthew Taylor	Sacked	9 February 2022	21st	(Wales) Michael Flynn	15 February 2022
Bradford City	(Scotland) Derek Adams	Sacked	15 February 2022	11th	(Wales) Mark Hughes	24 February 2022
Reading	(Serbia) Veljko Paunović	Mutual consent	19 February 2022	21st	(England) Paul Ince (Interim) (Barbados) Michael Gilkes (Interim)	19 February 2022
Peterborough United	(Scotland) Darren Ferguson	Resigned	20 February 2022	23rd	(Northern Ireland) Grant McCann	24 February 2022
Morecambe	(Northern Ireland) Stephen Robinson	Signed by St Mirren	22 February 2022	21st	(Scotland) Derek Adams	24 February 2022
Leyton Orient	(Wales) Kenny Jackett	Sacked	22 February 2022	18th	(England) Richie Wellens	9 March 2022
Carlisle United	(England) Keith Millen	Mutual Consent	23 February 2022	23rd	(England) Paul Simpson	23 February 2022
Leeds United	(Argentina) Marcelo Bielsa	Sacked	27 February 2022	16th	(United States) Jesse Marsch	28 February 2022
Stevenage	(England) Paul Tisdale	Sacked	16 March 2022	22nd	(Scotland) Steve Evans	16 March 2022
Barrow	(England) Mark Cooper	Mutual consent	20 March 2022	21st	(England) Phil Brown	21 March 2022
AFC Wimbledon	(England) Mark Robinson	Sacked	28 March 2022	21st	(Wales) Mark Bowen	30 March 2022
Crewe Alexandra	(Gibraltar) David Artell	Sacked	11 April 2022	24th	(England) Alex Morris	11 April 2022
Burnley	(England) Sean Dyche	Sacked	15 April 2022	18th	(England) Mike Jackson (England) Connor King (England) Ben Mee (joint-caretakers)	15 April 2022
Barnsley	(Sweden) Poya Asbaghi	Mutual consent	24 April 2022	24th	(Republic of Ireland) Martin Devaney (Interim)	24 April 2022
Crawley Town	(England) John Yems	Suspended	5 May 2022	16th	(England) Lewis Young (caretaker)	5 May 2022
Hartlepool United	(England) Graeme Lee	Sacked	5 May 2022	16th	(England) Michael Nelson (caretaker)	5 May 2022

== Deaths ==
- 3 June 2021: Alan Miller, 51, Arsenal, Middlesbrough, West Bromwich Albion and Blackburn Rovers goalkeeper
- 6 June 2021: Paul Cahill, 65, Portsmouth, Tranmere Rovers and Stockport County defender
- 8 June 2021: John Angus, 82, England and Burnley defender
- 19 June 2021: Spencer Whelan, 49, Chester City and Shrewsbury Town defender
- 25 June 2021: Mike Burgess, 89, Leyton Orient, Newport County, A.F.C. Bournemouth, Halifax Town and Gillingham defender
- 29 June 2021: Jock Aird, 94, Scotland, New Zealand and Burnley defender
- 9 July 2021: Paul Mariner, 68, England, Plymouth Argyle, Ipswich Town, Arsenal and Portsmouth forward, who also managed Plymouth Argyle
- 10 July 2021: Jimmy Gabriel, 80, Scotland, Everton, Southampton, A.F.C. Bournemouth and Brentford midfielder
- 11 July 2021: Ernie Moss, 71, Chesterfield, Peterborough United, Mansfield Town, Port Vale, Lincoln City, Doncaster Rovers, Stockport County and Scarborough forward
- 12 July 2021: Mick Bates, 73, Leeds United, Walsall, Bradford City and Doncaster Rovers midfielder
- 14 July 2021: Bobby Barr, 51, Halifax Town defender.
- 16 July 2021: Keith Bambridge, 85, Rotherham United, Darlington and Halifax Town outside left
- 17 July 2021: George Curtis, 82, Coventry City and Aston Villa defender, who also managed Coventry City
- 18 July 2021: Jeff Barmby, 78, York City striker
- 21 July 2021: Tommy Leishman, 83, Liverpool wing half
- 21 July 2021: Ken Ronaldson, 75, Bristol Rovers and Gillingham winger.
- 21 July 2021: Mike Smith, 83, Hull City manager
- 23 July 2021: Andy Higgins, 61, Chesterfield, Port Vale, Hartlepool United, Rochdale and Chester City defender
- 26 July 2021: Ally Dawson, 63, Scotland and Blackburn Rovers defender
- 28 July 2021: Derek Tomkinson, 90, Port Vale and Macclesfield Town forward
- 31 July 2021: Terry Cooper, 77, England, Leeds United, Middlesbrough, Bristol City, Bristol Rovers and Doncaster Rovers left back, who also managed Bristol Rovers, Bristol City, Exeter City and Birmingham City
- 1 August 2021: Eddie Presland, 78, West Ham United and Crystal Palace defender
- 7 August 2021: Robbie Cooke, 64, Mansfield Town, Peterborough United, Cambridge United, Brentford and Millwall forward
- 18 August 2021: Gerry Jones, 75, Stoke City outside left
- 21 August 2021: Arthur Smith BEM, 106, Bury and Leicester City winger
- 25 August 2021: Ray Aspden, 83, Rochdale defender
- 25 August 2021: Bobby Waddell, 81, Blackpool and Bradford Park Avenue forward.
- 27 August 2021: Peter McNamee, 86, Peterborough United and Notts County outside left.
- 27 August 2021: Johnny Williamson, 92, Manchester City and Blackburn Rovers forward.
- 28 August 2021: Sam Oji, 35, Birmingham City, Leyton Orient and Hereford United defender.
- 1 September 2021: Sid Watson, 93, Mansfield Town wing half.
- c. 11 September 2021: Tom Anthony, 78, Brentford left back.
- 17 September 2021: Tony Scott, 80, West Ham United, Aston Villa, Torquay United, A.F.C. Bournemouth and Exeter City winger.
- 19 September 2021: Jimmy Greaves MBE, 81, England World Cup winner, Chelsea, Tottenham Hotspur and West Ham United striker.
- 19 September 2021: Terry Long, 86, Crystal Palace defender.
- 20 September 2021: Tony Toms, 76, Hartlepool United, Gillingham and Sheffield Wednesday trainer/coach.
- 25 September 2021: Len Ashurst, 82, Sunderland and Hartlepool United defender, who also managed Hartlepool United, Gillingham, Sheffield Wednesday, Newport County, Cardiff City and Sunderland.
- 27 September 2021: Martin Burleigh, 70, Newcastle United, Darlington, Carlisle United and Hartlepool United goalkeeper.
- 27 September 2021: Roger Hunt MBE, 83, England World Cup winner, Liverpool and Bolton Wanderers striker.
- 28 September 2021: Alan Woods, 84, Tottenham Hotspur, Swansea City and York City wing half.
- 29 September 2021: Ray Ruffett, 97, Luton Town wing half.
- 1 October 2021: Freddie Hill, 81, England, Bolton Wanderers, Halifax Town, Manchester City and Peterborough United inside forward.
- 1 October 2021: Paul Linger, 46, Charlton Athletic, Leyton Orient and Brighton & Hove Albion midfielder.
- 1 October 2021: Brian Sherratt, 77, Stoke City, Oxford United, Barnsley and Colchester United goalkeeper.
- 4 October 2021: Terry Eades, 77, Cambridge United defender.
- 7 October 2021: Andy Porter, 84, Watford midfielder.
- 16 October 2021: George Kinnell, 83, Stoke City, Oldham Athletic, Sunderland and Middlesbrough midfielder.
- 26 October 2021: Walter Smith OBE, 73, Everton manager and Manchester United assistant manager.
- 30 October 2021: Billy Webb, 89, Leicester City and Stockport County left back.
- 2 November 2021: Alf Patrick, 100, York City forward.
- 5 November 2021: Bobby Bainbridge, 90, York City striker.
- 6 November 2021: Jim Kerray, 85, Huddersfield Town and Newcastle United striker.
- 7 November 2021: Barry Jackson, 83, York City defender and record appearance-maker.
- 9 November 2021: Laurie Sheffield, 82, Newport County, Doncaster Rovers, Norwich City, Rotherham United, Oldham Athletic, Luton Town and Peterborough United forward.
- 10 November 2021: Bill Calder, 87, Leicester City, Bury, Oxford United and Rochdale forward.
- 12 November 2021: Ron Flowers MBE, 87, England World Cup winner, Wolverhampton Wanderers and Northampton Town midfielder, who also managed Northampton Town.
- 12 November 2021: Bertie Auld, 83, Scotland and Birmingham City outside left.
- 13 November 2021: Louis Bimpson, 92, Liverpool, Blackburn Rovers, Bournemouth & Boscombe Athletic and Rochdale striker.
- 18 November 2021: Joe Laidlaw, 71, Middlesbrough, Carlisle United, Doncaster Rovers, Portsmouth, Hereford United and Mansfield Town midfielder.
- 21 November 2021: John Sewell, 85, Charlton Athletic, Crystal Palace and Leyton Orient defender.
- 24 November 2021: Frank Burrows, 77, Scunthorpe United and Swindon Town defender, who also managed Portsmouth, Cardiff City and Swansea City.
- 24 November 2021: Cliff Marshall, 66, Everton and Southport forward.
- c. 25 November 2021: Keith Morton, 87, Crystal Palace and Darlington forward.
- 28 November 2021: Johnny Hills, 87, Tottenham Hotspur and Bristol Rovers full back.
- 30 November 2021: Phil Dwyer, 68, Wales and Cardiff City defender.
- 30 November 2021: Ray Kennedy, 70, England, Arsenal, Liverpool, Swansea City and Hartlepool United midfielder/forward.
- 30 November 2021: John Sillett, 85, Chelsea, Coventry City and Plymouth Argyle full back, who also managed Hereford United and Coventry City.
- 6 December 2021: Marvin Morgan, 38, Aldershot Town, Dagenham & Redbridge, Shrewsbury Town, Plymouth Argyle and Hartlepool United forward.
- 14 December 2021: Jimmy Robson. 83, Burnley, Blackpool, Barnsley and Bury inside forward.
- c. 16 December 2021: John 'Dan' Archer, 80, Port Vale, Bournemouth & Boscombe Athletic, Crewe Alexandra and Chesterfield midfielder/inside forward.
- c. 17 December 2021: Trevor Thompson, 66, West Bromwich Albion, Newport County and Lincoln City full back.
- 21 December 2021: Roy Sawyer, 81, Barnsley defender.
- 29 December 2021: Steve Peplow, 72, Liverpool, Swindon Town, Nottingham Forest and Tranmere Rovers winger.
- 7 January 2022: Jimmy Smith, 91, Chelsea and Leyton Orient winger.
- 8 January 2022: Keith Todd, 80, Swansea Town forward.
- c. 10 January 2022: Glyn Jones, 85, Sheffield United, Rotherham United and Mansfield Town inside forward.
- c. 14 January 2022: Lol Morgan, 90, Huddersfield Town, Rotherham United and Darlington defender, who also managed Darlington and Norwich City.
- c. 15 January 2022: Paul Hinshelwood, 65, Crystal Palace, Oxford United, Millwall and Colchester United right back.
- 17 January 2022: Jackie Fisher, 96, Millwall and AFC Bournemouth defender.
- 18 January 2022: Jamie Vincent, 46, Crystal Palace, AFC Bournemouth, Huddersfield Town, Portsmouth, Derby County, Millwall, Swindon Town, Walsall and Aldershot Town defender.
- 21 January 2022: Howard Radford, 91, Bristol Rovers goalkeeper.
- 3 February 2022: Alex Ingram, 77, Nottingham Forest forward.
- 4 February 2022: Steve Finney, 48, Preston North End, Swindon Town, Carlisle United, Leyton Orient and Chester City striker.
- c. 10 February 2022: Mick Newman, 89, West Ham United inside forward.
- 13 February 2022: Andy Spring, 56, Coventry City and Bristol Rovers right back.
- 14 February 2022: Geoff Barker, 73, Hull City, Darlington, Reading and Grimsby Town defender.
- 17 February 2022: Steve Burtenshaw, 86, Brighton & Hove Albion wing half, who also managed Sheffield Wednesday and Queens Park Rangers.
- 18 February 2022: Billy McEwan, 70, Blackpool, Brighton & Hove Albion, Chesterfield, Mansfield Town, Peterborough United and Rotherham United midfielder, who also managed Sheffield United, Rotherham United and Darlington
- 18 February 2022: Trevor Swift, 73, Rotherham United defender.
- 19 February 2022: Doug Baillie, 85, Swindon Town defender.
- 19 February 2022: Joey Beauchamp, 50, Oxford United and Swindon Town midfielder.
- 27 February 2022: Alan Anderson, 82, Scotland, Millwall and Scunthorpe United defender.
- 6 March 2022: Frank O'Farrell, 94, Republic of Ireland, West Ham United and Preston North End wing half, who also managed Torquay United, Leicester City, Manchester United and Cardiff City.
- 8 March 2022: Gordon Lee, 87, Aston Villa and Shrewsbury Town defender, who managed Port Vale, Blackburn Rovers, Newcastle United, Everton, Preston North End and Leicester City.
- 15 March 2022: Tom Barnett, 85, Crystal Palace winger.
- 16 March 2022: Tony Marchi, 89, Tottenham Hotspur wing half, who also managed Northampton Town.
- 18 March 2022: Andy Lochhead, 81, Burnley, Leicester City, Aston Villa and Oldham Athletic striker.
- c. 22 March 2022: Bill Shipwright, 89, Watford and Aldershot defender.
- 23 March 2022: Terry Darracott, 71, Everton and Wrexham full back.
- c. 24 March 2022: Ivan Hollett, 81, Mansfield Town, Chesterfield, Crewe Alexandra, Cambridge United and Hereford United striker.
- March 2022: Alan Wooler, 68, West Ham United and Aldershot defender.
- 29 March 2022: Ansah Owusu, 42, Wimbledon and Bristol Rovers midfielder.
- 31 March 2022: Bob Todd, 72, Rotherham United, Mansfield Town and Workington winger.
- 5 April 2022: Edward Rayner, 89, Stoke City midfielder.
- c. 14 April 2022: Con Sullivan, 93, Bristol City and Arsenal goalkeeper.
- 17 April 2022: Jimmy Harris, 88, Everton, Birmingham City and Oldham Athletic forward.
- 20 April 2022: Harold Wilcockson, 78, Rotherham United, Doncaster Rovers and Sheffield Wednesday defender.
- c. 21 April 2022: Bernard Fisher, 88, Hull City and Bradford City goalkeeper.
- 24 April 2022: Freddy Hall, 37, Bermuda and Northampton Town goalkeeper.
- 30 April 2022: Neil Campbell, 45, York City, Scarborough and Southend United striker.
- 8 May 2022: Syd Farrimond, 81, Bolton Wanderers and Tranmere Rovers defender.
- 15 May 2022: Mark Davies, 49, Swansea City defender.
- 18 May 2022: Brian Bedford, 88, Reading, Southampton, AFC Bournemouth, Queens Park Rangers, Scunthorpe United and Brentford forward.
- 26 May 2022: Neil O'Donnell, 72, Norwich City, Gillingham and Sheffield Wednesday midfielder.
- 26 May 2022: Jimmy Whitehouse, 87, Reading, Coventry City and Millwall forward.
- 30 May 2022: Craig Farrell, 39, Carlisle United forward.

== Retirements ==
- 1 June 2021: Rene Gilmartin, 34, former Walsall, Watford, Plymouth Argyle and Colchester United goalkeeper.
- 2 June 2021: Mark Milligan, 35, former Australia and Southend United midfielder
- 3 June 2021: Nicklas Bendtner, 33, former Denmark, Arsenal and Nottingham Forest forward
- 3 June 2021: Steven Whittaker, 36, former Scotland and Norwich City defender
- 12 June 2021: Carl Tremarco, 35, former Tranmere Rovers, Wrexham and Macclesfield Town defender
- 28 June 2021: David Gray, 33, former Manchester United, Crewe Alexandra, Plymouth Argyle, Preston North End, Stevenage and Burton Albion defender
- 28 June 2021: Tony McMahon, 35, former Middlesbrough, Sheffield United, Blackpool, Bradford City and Oxford United right back.
- 2 July 2021: Sam Hird, 33, former Doncaster Rovers, Chesterfield and Barrow defender
- 15 July 2021: Arjen Robben, 37, former Netherlands and Chelsea winger.
- 20 July 2021: Joe Riley, 29, former Bolton Wanderers, Oxford United, Bury, Shrewsbury Town, Plymouth Argyle, and Mansfield Town defender
- 30 July 2021: Scott Brown, 36, former Bristol City, Cheltenham Town, Port Vale, Morecambe and Accrington Stanley midfielder
- 30 July 2021: Nathan Dyer, 33, former Southampton and Swansea City winger
- 2 August 2021: Stewart Downing, 37, former England, Middlesbrough, Aston Villa, Liverpool, West Ham United and Blackburn Rovers midfielder
- 8 August 2021: Jose Baxter, 29, former Everton, Tranmere Rovers, Oldham Athletic, Sheffield United, and Plymouth Argyle midfielder
- 16 August 2021: Tommie Hoban, 27, former Watford defender
- 30 August 2021: Billy Clarke, 33, former Ipswich Town, Blackpool, Crawley Town, Bradford City, Charlton Athletic, Plymouth Argyle and Grimsby Town striker.
- 1 September 2021: Shaun MacDonald, 33, former Wales, Swansea City, A.F.C. Bournemouth, Wigan Athletic, Rotherham United and Crewe Alexandra midfielder.
- 1 September 2021: Kingsley James, 29, former Sheffield United, Port Vale, Chasetown, Hereford United, Chester, FC Halifax Town, Macclesfield Town, Barrow, Guiseley, Gainsborough Trinity, Hyde United, Farsley Celtic, and England C midfielder
- 13 September 2021: Demba Ba, 36, former Senegal, West Ham United, Newcastle United and Chelsea striker.
- 14 September 2021: Grant Leadbitter, 35, former Sunderland, Ipswich Town and Middlesbrough midfielder.
- 17 September 2021: Jack Hobbs, 33, former Lincoln City, Liverpool, Scunthorpe United, Leicester City, Hull City, Nottingham Forest, and Bolton Wanderers defender
- 18 September 2021: Kári Árnason, 38, Iceland, Plymouth Argyle and Rotherham United defender.
- 26 September 2021: Samir Nasri, 34, former France, Arsenal, Manchester City and West Ham United midfielder.
- 28 September 2021: Steven Taylor, 35, former Newcastle United, Wycombe Wanderers, Ipswich Town and Peterborough United defender.
- 11 October 2021: Wayne Routledge, 36, former Crystal Palace, Tottenham Hotspur, Aston Villa, Queens Park Rangers, Newcastle United and Swansea City midfielder.
- 15 October 2021: Simon Cox, 34, former Republic of Ireland, Reading, Swindon Town, West Bromwich Albion, Nottingham Forest and Southend United striker.
- 23 October 2021: Adam Federici, 36, former Australia, Reading, Southend United, Bournemouth and Stoke City goalkeeper.
- 28 October 2021: George Boyd, 36, former Scotland, Peterborough United, Hull City, Burnley, Sheffield Wednesday and Salford City midfielder.
- 2 November 2021: Luke Varney, 39, former Crewe Alexandra, Charlton Athletic, Derby County, Portsmouth, Leeds United, Blackburn Rovers, Ipswich Town, Burton Albion and Cheltenham Town forward.
- 12 November 2021: Yuki Abe, 40, former Japan and Leicester City midfielder.
- 12 November 2021: Joe Ledley, 34, former Wales, Cardiff City, Crystal Palace, Derby County, Charlton Athletic and Newport County midfielder.
- 16 November 2021: Jonás Gutiérrez, 38, former Argentina and Newcastle United midfielder.
- 24 November 2021: David Templeton, 32, former Burton Albion winger.
- 27 November 2021: Maxi Rodríguez, 40, former Argentina and Liverpool midfielder.
- 4 December 2021: Filipe Morais, 36, former Chelsea, Milton Keynes Dons, Millwall, Oldham Athletic, Stevenage, Bradford City, Bolton Wanderers, Crawley Town, Oldham Athletic, and Grimsby Town midfielder
- 14 December 2021: Collin Quaner, 30, former Huddersfield Town forward.
- 15 December 2021: Sergio Agüero, 33, former Argentina and Manchester City striker.
- 19 December 2021: Adam Collin, 37, former Carlisle United, Rotherham United and Notts County goalkeeper.
- 22 December 2021: David Raven, 36, former Liverpool, Carlisle United, Shrewsbury Town and Tranmere Rovers defender.
- 29 December 2021: Fabricio Coloccini, 39, former Argentina and Newcastle United defender.
- 1 January 2022: Sam McQueen, 26, former Southampton left back.
- 4 January 2022: Davy Pröpper, 30, former Netherlands and Brighton & Hove Albion midfielder.
- 4 January 2022: Alan Sheehan, 35, former Leicester City, Mansfield Town, Leeds United, Crewe Alexandra, Oldham Athletic, Swindon Town, Notts County, Bradford City, Peterborough United, Luton Town, Northampton Town and Lincoln City defender
- 5 January 2022: Scott Davies, 34, former Morecambe, Fleetwood Town and Tranmere Rovers goalkeeper.
- 6 January 2022: Mark Hughes, 35, former Everton, Stockport County, Northampton Town, Walsall, Bury, Accrington Stanley, Stevenage and Bristol Rovers defender
- 10 January 2022: Matt Gilks, 39, former Scotland, Blackpool, Burnley, Norwich City, Rochdale, Wigan Athletic, Shrewsbury Town, Scunthorpe United, Lincoln City, Fleetwood Town and Bolton Wanderers goalkeeper.
- 11 January 2022: Ryan Shawcross, 34, former England, Manchester United and Stoke City defender
- 25 January 2022: Gary Dicker, 35, former Stockport County, Brighton & Hove Albion, Rochdale, Crawley Town and Carlisle United midfielder.
- 2 February 2022: Matt Bloomfield, 37, former Ipswich Town and Wycombe Wanderers midfielder.
- 19 February 2022: Alejandro Faurlín, 35, former Queens Park Rangers midfielder
- 8 March 2022: Bradley Wright-Phillips, 36, former Manchester City, Southampton, Plymouth Argyle and Charlton Athletic striker.
- 20 March 2022: Tristan Nydam, 22, former Ipswich Town midfielder/defender.
- 24 March 2022: Jermain Defoe OBE, 39, former England, West Ham United, Tottenham Hotspur, Portsmouth, Sunderland and AFC Bournemouth striker.
- 26 March 2022: Laurent Koscielny, 36, former France and Arsenal defender.
- 31 March 2022: Declan Rudd, 31, former Norwich City, Charlton Athletic and Preston North End goalkeeper.
- 14 April 2022: Conor McLaughlin, 30, former Northern Ireland, Preston North End, Fleetwood Town, Millwall and Sunderland right back.
- 22 April 2022: Stephen Ward, 36, former Republic of Ireland, Wolverhampton Wanderers, Burnley, Stoke City, Ipswich Town and Walsall left back.
- 30 April 2022: Andy Keogh, 35, former Republic of Ireland, Leeds United, Bury, Scunthorpe United, Wolverhampton Wanderers, Cardiff City, Bristol City, Millwall and Blackpool striker.
- 3 May 2022: George Elokobi, 37, former Colchester United, Chester City, Wolverhampton Wanderers, Nottingham Forest, Bristol City and Oldham Athletic defender.
- 3 May 2022: Luke McCormick, 38, former Plymouth Argyle, Oxford United and Swindon Town goalkeeper.
- 7 May 2022: Danny Livesey, 37, former Bolton Wanderers, Notts County, Rochdale, Blackpool and Carlisle United defender.
- 8 May 2022: Marko Marin, 33, former Germany and Chelsea midfielder.
- 11 May 2022: Mat Sadler, 37, former Birmingham City, Watford, Walsall, Crawley Town, Rotherham United and Shrewsbury Town defender.
- 16 May 2022: Scott Vernon, 38, former Oldham Athletic, Blackpool, Colchester United, Shrewsbury Town and Grimsby Town striker.
- 17 May 2022: Martin Škrtel, 37, former Slovakia and Liverpool defender.
- 17 May 2022: Mark Carrington, 35, former Crewe Alexandra, Milton Keynes Dons and Bury midfielder.
- 20 May 2022: Joseph Mills, 32, former Southampton, Reading, Burnley, Oldham Athletic, Forest Green Rovers and Northampton Town defender.
- 21 May 2022: Adebayo Akinfenwa, 38, former Boston United, Leyton Orient, Doncaster Rovers, Torquay United, Swansea City, Millwall, Northampton Town, Gillingham, A.F.C. Wimbledon and Wycombe Wanderers striker.
- 22 May 2022: Mark Noble, 34, former West Ham United midfielder.
- 25 May 2022: Stephen Dobbie, 39, former Swansea City, Blackpool, Brighton & Hove Albion, Crystal Palace and Bolton Wanderers forward.
- 26 May 2022: Lee Grant, 39, former Derby County, Sheffield Wednesday, Burnley, Stoke City and Manchester United goalkeeper.
- 27 May 2022: Paul McShane, 36, former Republic of Ireland, West Bromwich Albion, Sunderland, Hull City, Reading and Rochdale defender.

== New clubs ==
- AFC Whyteleafe
- Macclesfield F.C.

== Clubs removed ==
- Coventry United W.F.C.
- Crane Sports F.C.
- Fire United Christian F.C.
- Langney Wanderers F.C.
- Peterborough Northern Star F.C.
