= Len Casey (disambiguation) =

Len Casey is a rugby league footballer.

Len or Leonard Casey may also refer to:

- Len Casey (footballer)
- Len Casey (TV producer) in The C.G.E. Show
- Leonard Casey, character played by Geoffrey Bayldon
