= Russell Williamson =

English footballer

Personal information
- Full name: Russell Ian Williamson
- Date of birth: 17 March 1980 (age 46)
- Place of birth: Loughton, England
- Position: Midfielder

Youth career
- Wimbledon

Senior career*
Years	Team	Apps	(Gls)
1998–2000	Wimbledon	0	(0)
2000–2001	Southend United	12	(0)
2001–2002	Chelmsford City	8	(0)
- Bishop's Stortford
- Hornchurch
- Billericay Town
- Heybridge Swifts
- Waltham Abbey
- Bishop's Stortford
- Brimsdown Rovers
- Enfield 1893
- * Club domestic league appearances and goals

Russell Ian Williamson (born 17 March 1980) is an English former footballer who played as a midfielder.

== Career ==
After progressing through the youth ranks, Williamson signed a professional contract with Wimbledon in June 1998. Upon his release from Wimbledon, Williamson underwent a trial with Scottish club Clyde. In November 2000, Williamson signed for Southend United. During his time at Southend, Williamson made twelve Football League appearances, starting nine times. Williamson scored twice for Southend, coming in FA Cup matches against Torquay United. Following his spell with Southend, Williamson dropped into Non-League football, playing for Chelmsford City, Bishop's Stortford, Hornchurch, Billericay Town, Heybridge Swifts, Waltham Abbey, Brimsdown Rovers and Enfield 1893.

During the 2009–10 season, Owusu played alongside former Wimbledon and Chelmsford teammate Ansah Owusu for Larsens in the Waltham Sunday Football League.
