= Jimmy Smith (footballer, born 1930) =

English footballer (1930–2022)

Personal information
- Full name: James Harold Smith
- Date of birth: 16 December 1930
- Place of birth: Sheffield, England
- Date of death: 7 January 2022 (aged 91)
- Position: Winger

Senior career*
Years	Team	Apps	(Gls)
- Shildon
1951–1955	Chelsea	19	(3)
1955–1958	Leyton Orient	37	(3)
Total		56	(6)
- * Club domestic league appearances and goals

James Harold Smith (6 December 1930 – 7 January 2022) was an English professional footballer who played as a winger for Shildon, Chelsea and Leyton Orient.

At the time of his death on 7 January 2022, aged 91, he was Chelsea's oldest surviving player, succeeded by Len Casey.
