= Neil O'Donnell (Scottish footballer) =

Scottish footballer (1949–2022)

Personal information
- Date of birth: 21 December 1949
- Place of birth: Glasgow, Lanarkshire, Scotland
- Date of death: 19 May 2022 (aged 72)
- Position: Midfielder

Senior career*
| Years | Team | Apps | (Gls) |
| 1967–1974 | Norwich City | 50 | (2) |
| 1974–1975 | Gillingham | 24 | (0) |
| 1975–1977 | Sheffield Wednesday | 40 | (1) |
| Total | | 114 | (3) |
- * Club domestic league appearances and goals

Neil O'Donnell (21 December 1949 – 19 May 2022) was a Scottish professional footballer who played as a midfielder.

== Career ==
O'Donnell was born in Glasgow, Lanarkshire, Scotland. He began his career with Norwich City, for whom he made 64 appearances (scoring three goals) and was a member of the club's squad that won the second division championship in 1972. After leaving Carrow Road in 1974, O'Donnell played for Gillingham and Sheffield Wednesday. He retired due to injury after the 1976–77 season, and played for Sheffield Wednesday in a testimonial match against Norwich.

O'Donnell died on 19 May 2022.

== Honours ==
- Second Division Championship 1971–72
