= Bernard Fisher (footballer) =

English footballer (1934–2022)

Personal information
- Full name: James Bernard Fisher
- Date of birth: 23 February 1934
- Place of birth: York, England
- Date of death: 7 April 2022 (aged 88)
- Position: Goalkeeper

Youth career
- Hull City

Senior career*
Years	Team	Apps	(Gls)
1955–1963	Hull City	126	(0)
1963–1965	Bradford City	60	(0)
Total		186	(0)
- * Club domestic league appearances and goals

James Bernard Fisher (23 February 1934 – 7 April 2022) was an English professional footballer who played as a goalkeeper in the Football League for Hull City and Bradford City.

He died in April 2022, aged 88.
