= Andy Porter (footballer, born 1937) =

Scottish footballer (1937–2021)

Personal information
- Date of birth: 21 January 1937
- Place of birth: Stewarton, Scotland
- Date of death: 7 October 2021 (aged 84)
- Place of death: Hampshire, England
- Position: Wing-half

Senior career*
Years	Team	Apps	(Gls)
1955–1959	Darvel		
1957–1958	→ Hamilton Academical (trial)	1	
1959–1963	Watford	72	(4)
1963–1966	Guildford City		
1966	Ashford Town		
1966–1970	Hatfield Town		
- * Club domestic league appearances and goals

Andrew Porter (21 January 1937 – 7 October 2021) was a Scottish footballer who played as a Wing-half. He played 72 matches in the Football League for Watford and one match for Hamilton Academical in the Scottish League.

== Career ==
Porter played for Scottish Junior club Darvel as an amateur in 1955 before turning professional in May 1956. He had a trial with Hamilton Academical, making a single appearance in the Scottish League Second Division in the 1957–58 season.

In June 1959 Porter signed with Football League club Watford and made his first league appearance for the club in January 1960. He made ten appearances in the 1959–60 season as Watford won promotion to Division Three. Over the following three seasons he made a further 62 league appearances, scoring 4 goals.

Porter transferred to non-league club Guildford City of the Southern League for a £1,000 fee in May 1963 and spent three years with the club where he became team captain. In the August 1966 he moved to Kent based Southern League club Ashford Town on a months trial. In September 1966, before the end of the trial period, he was released to take the role as player/coach with Hatfield Town of the Metropolitan League. He was Hatfields first professional player and remained with the club until his competitive playing career was ended by a broken leg. Whilst with Hatfield Town he played in friendlies and charity games for West Herts Wanderers.
