= Ansah Owusu =

English footballer (1979–2022)

Personal information
- Full name: Ansah Ossei-Owusu
- Date of birth: 22 November 1979
- Place of birth: Hackney, England
- Date of death: 19 March 2022 (aged 42)
- Place of death: Finchley, England
- Height: 1.80 m (5 ft 11 in)
- Position: Midfielder

Youth career
- Wimbledon

Senior career*
Years	Team	Apps	(Gls)
1998–2001	Wimbledon	4	(0)
2000	→ Raith Rovers (loan)	10	(3)
2001	→ Bristol Rovers (loan)	17	(0)
2002	Chelmsford City	9	(1)
2002–2003	Enfield	18	(0)
Total		58	(4)
- * Club domestic league appearances and goals

Ansah Ossei-Owusu (22 November 1979 – 19 March 2022) was an English professional footballer who played as a midfielder.

== Career ==
Owusu began his career at Wimbledon, signing his first professional contract with the club in June 1998 after playing in the club's academy. In March 2000, Owusu was sent on loan to Scottish First Division club Raith Rovers. At Raith, Owusu enjoyed a loan spell that was a "huge success" according to the Daily Record, scoring three goals in ten appearances, with Raith manager Peter Hetherston expressing an interest in taking Owusu back on loan for the following season. As a result of Wimbledon's relegation from the Premiership, Owusu remained at Wimbledon for their 2000–01 First Division campaign. On 19 September 2000, Owusu made his debut for Wimbledon, starting in a 0–0 draw against Wigan Athletic in the League Cup. Owusu made three Football League appearances for Wimbledon, before an injury halted his progress at the club. On 9 February 2001, Owusu was sent on loan to Bristol Rovers, making 17 league appearances for the club until the end of the season. At the end of the 2000–01 season, Owusu was released by Wimbledon. In December 2001, Owusu underwent a trial with Macclesfield Town, however failed to win a contract with the club.

In the summer of 2002, Owusu signed for Southern League club Chelmsford City. Owusu made nine appearances at Chelmsford, scoring on his home debut for the club in a 1–1 draw against Hinckley United. Following his time at Chelmsford, Owusu signed for Isthmian League outfit Enfield.

During the 2009–10 season, Owusu played alongside former Wimbledon and Chelmsford teammate Russell Williamson for Larsens in the Waltham Sunday Football League.

== Personal life ==
Owusu's cousin, Lloyd, made over 300 Football League appearances. Following Owusu's playing career, he worked as a constable for the Metropolitan Police in north London.

On 19 March 2022, Owusu died at the age of 42, following care from the North London Hospice.
