= Thomas Barnett (footballer, born 1936) =

English footballer (1936–2022)

Tom Barnett

Personal information
- Full name: Thomas Andrew Barnett
- Date of birth: 12 October 1936
- Place of birth: Muswell Hill, England
- Date of death: 15 March 2022 (aged 85)
- Position: Winger

Senior career*
Years	Team	Apps	(Gls)
1957–1958	Chatham Town		
1958–1961	Crystal Palace	14	(2)
1961–1962	Margate		
1962–1970	Romford	286	(111)
1970–1971	Bexley United		
1974–1975	St Albans City	8	(0)

Managerial career
- Hoddesdon Town
- 1974–1975: St Albans City
- 1976–1984: Hertford Town
- 1985: Hertford Town
- * Club domestic league appearances and goals

Thomas Andrew Barnett (12 December 1936 – 15 March 2022) was an English professional football player and coach who played as a winger.

== Career ==
Barnett made 14 appearances in the Football League for Crystal Palace between 1958 and 1961, and he also played non-league football for Chatham Town, Margate and Romford. After playing for Bexley United, he became player-manager at St Albans City. He later managed Hoddesdon Town and Hertford Town.

== Later life ==
After retiring from football, Barnett became a publican and owned his own brewery in Sawbridgeworth. Barnett died on 15 March 2022, at the age of 85.
