= Robert Bainbridge (footballer) =

English footballer (1931–2021)

Personal information
- Full name: Robert Esmond Bainbridge
- Date of birth: 22 February 1931
- Place of birth: York, Yorkshire, England
- Date of death: 16 October 2021 (aged 90)
- Height: 5 ft 8 in (1.73 m)
- Position: Striker

Youth career
- Cliftonville

Senior career*
Years	Team	Apps	(Gls)
- Terrys
1954–1956	York City	4	(0)
- Frickley Colliery
- Denaby United
- Selby Town
Total		4	(0)
- * Club domestic league appearances and goals

Robert Esmond Bainbridge (22 February 1931 – 16 October 2021), also known as Bobby Bainbridge, was an English professional footballer who played as a striker in the Football League for York City, in non-League football for Cliftonville, Terrys, Frickley Colliery, Denaby United and Selby Town.

Bainbridge died on 16 October 2021, at the age of 90.
