= Len Casey (footballer) =

English footballer (1931–2022)

Len Casey MBE
Personal information
- Full name: Leonard John Casey
- Date of birth: 24 May 1931
- Place of birth: Hackney, London, England
- Date of death: July 3, 2022 (aged 91)
- Position: Wing half

Senior career*
Years	Team	Apps	(Gls)
1948–1950	Barking		
1952–1954	Leyton		
1954–1958	Chelsea	34	(0)
1958–1961	Plymouth Argyle	44	(0)
Total		78	(0)
- * Club domestic league appearances and goals

Leonard John Casey MBE (24 May 1931 – 3 July 2022) was an English footballer who played as a wing half.

He played non-league football for Barking, playing in the Amateur Cup semi-final, before leaving to undertake his National Service.

On his return in 1952, he joined Leyton before joining Chelsea in 1954. He spent four years at Stamford Bridge, making 34 league appearances. Casey was transferred to Plymouth Argyle in 1958 and made 24 appearances in the club's Third Division title winning campaign. He made 20 appearances in the Second Division the following season, but his last two seasons with the club were blighted by injury, with his only two appearances coming in the League Cup, ten months apart. He retired in 1961, having made 48 appearances in all competitions for Argyle.

Casey died in July 2022, at the age of 91. Prior to his death, he was the oldest living former Chelsea player.

== Honours ==
Plymouth Argyle

- Football League Third Division: 1958–59.

Individual

- Casey was appointed a Member of the Order of the British Empire (MBE) in the 1993 Birthday Honours "for services to training", in recognition of his post-football career as Training Officer at Telephone Cables Ltd.
